= Big West Conference women's soccer tournament =

- Conference soccer championship
- Sport: College soccer
- Conference: Big West Conference
- Number of teams: 6
- Format: Single-elimination
- Current stadium: Campus Sites (Higher Seed)
- Played: 1996–1997, 2003–present
- Last contest: 2026
- Current champion: Utah Valley (1st title)
- Most championships: Cal State Fullerton (8 titles)
- TV partner: ESPN+
- Official website: bigwest.org/wsoc

The Big West women's soccer tournament is the conference championship tournament in soccer, organised by the Big West Conference. The tournament has been held every year since 2003.

It is played under a single-elimination format and seeding is based on regular season records. The winner, declared conference champion, receives the conference's automatic bid to the NCAA Division I women's soccer championship.

Cal State Fullerton is the most winning team of the competition with 8 titles.

== Champions ==
=== Finals ===
Key

- (1) — Title number
- a.e.t. — Match went to extra time
- p – Match decided by a penalty shootout after extra time
- – Winning team also won regular season

Ed.	Year	Champion	Score	Runner-up	Venue / City	MVP	Ref.
1	1996	Cal Poly (1)	2–0	UC Irvine	Titan Stadium • Fullerton, Ca	(None)	
2	1997	UC Irvine (1)	3–2 (a.e.t.)	Cal Poly	Alex Spanos Stadium • S. Luis Obispo, Ca	(None)	
3	2003	Cal Poly (2)	2–0	UC Santa Barbara	Alex Spanos Stadium • S. Luis Obispo, Ca	Sharon Day, Cal Poly	
4	2004	Cal Poly (3)	2–0	UC Santa Barbara	Harder Stadium • Santa Barbara, Ca	Liz Hill, Cal Poly	
5	2005	Cal State Fullerton (1)	4–1	UC Riverside	Titan Stadium • Fullerton, Ca	Lauryn Welch, Cal State Fullerton	
6	2006	Cal State Fullerton (2)	2–1	Cal Poly	George Allen Field • Long Beach, Ca	Kristen Boujos, Cal State Fullerton	
7	2007	Cal State Fullerton (3)	0–0 (4–3 p)	Cal Poly	Titan Stadium • Fullerton, Ca	Shayla Sabin, Cal State Fullerton	
8	2008	UC Santa Barbara (1)	1–1 (6–5 p)	Long Beach State	George Allen Field • Long Beach, Ca	Sami Svrcek, UC Santa Barbara	
9	2009	UC Santa Barbara (2)	1–1 (5–4 p)	Cal Poly	Alex Spanos Stadium • S. Luis Obispo, Ca	Katy Roby, UC Santa Barbara	
10	2010	Long Beach State (1)	1–0	UC Irvine	Anteater Stadium • Irvine, Ca	Emily Kingsborough, Long Beach	
11	2011	Long Beach State (2)	1–0	UC Irvine	Anteater Stadium • Irvine, Ca	Sara Balcer, Long Beach	
12	2012	Cal State Northridge (1)	1–0 (a.e.t.)	Cal State Fullerton	Matador Soccer Field • Northridge, Ca	Melissa Fernandez, Cal State	
13	2013	Cal State Fullerton (4)	1–1 (2–1 p)	UC Riverside	Titan Stadium • Fullerton, Ca	Katie Pulliam, Cal State	
14	2014	Cal State Fullerton (5)	2–1	Long Beach State	Alex Spanos Stadium • S. Luis Obispo, Ca	Christina Burkenroad, Cal State	
15	2015	Cal State Fullerton (6)	1–0	Long Beach State	Titan Stadium • Fullerton, Ca	Christina Burkenroad, Cal State	
16	2016	Long Beach State (3)	3–0	UC Irvine	George Allen Field • Long Beach, Ca	Mimi Rangel, Long Beach State	
17	2017	Cal State Fullerton (7)	1–1 (4–3 p)	Cal State Northridge	Matador Soccer Field • Northridge, Ca	Morgan Bertsch, Cal State	
18	2018	Long Beach State (4)	2–0	UC Santa Barbara	Anteater Stadium • Irvine, Ca	Dana Fujikuni, Long Beach	
19	2019	Cal State Fullerton (8)	4–0	Cal State Northridge	Titan Stadium • Fullerton, Ca	Atlanta Primus, Cal State	
–	2020	(Cancelled due to COVID-19 pandemic)					
20	2021	UC Irvine (2)	1–0	Cal Poly	Anteater Stadium • Irvine, Ca	Maddy Chavez, UC Irvine	
21	2022	UC Irvine (3)	3–0	Long Beach State	Alex Spanos Stadium • S. Luis Obispo, Ca	Glo Hinojosa, UC Irvine	
22	2023	UC Irvine (4)	1–0	Cal Poly	Titan Stadium • Fullerton, Ca	Emilie Castanga, UC Irvine	
23	2024	UC Santa Barbara (3)	2–2 (8–7 p)	Cal State Bakersfield	Waipiʻo Peninsula Soccer Stadium • Waipahu, HI	Devin Greer & Sofie Rodriguez, UC Santa Barbara	
24	2025	Cal Poly (4)	1–0	UC Santa Barbara	Matador Soccer Field • Northridge, CA	Jessie Halladay, Cal Poly	
25	2026	Utah Valley (1)	2–0	UC San Diego	UCCU Stadium • Orem, UT	Quinn Rustand, Utah Valley	

There was no Big West Tournament held from 1998-2002 and the regular season champion during those years received the conference's automatic berth to the NCAA Division I women's soccer championship.

=== By school ===
As of 2026 tournament

School	W	L	T	Pct.	Finals	Titles	Title years
Cal Poly	14	6	5	.660	10	4	1996, 2003, 2004, 2025
Cal State Bakersfield	2	1	1	.625	1	0	—
Cal State Fullerton	14	8	6	.607	9	8	2005, 2006, 2007, 2013, 2014, 2015, 2017, 2019
Cal State Northridge	4	8	2	.357	3	1	2012
California Baptist	0	1	0	.000	0	0	—
Hawaii	0	2	0	.000	0	0	—
Long Beach State	11	4	3	.694	6	4	2010, 2011, 2016, 2018
Pacific	0	5	0	.000	0	0	—
Sacramento State	0	0	0	–	0	0	—
UC Davis	0	4	0	.000	0	0	—
UC Irvine	9	12	2	.435	8	4	1997, 2021, 2022, 2023
UC Riverside	1	4	2	.286	2	0	—
UC San Diego	1	1	0	.500	1	0	—
UC Santa Barbara	7	8	5	.475	6	3	2008, 2009, 2024
Utah Valley	2	0	0	1.000	1	1	2026

Teams in italics no longer sponsor women's soccer in the Big West.
