= Kaitlin Fregulia =

American soccer player (born 1998)

Personal information
- Full name: Kaitlin Danielle Fregulia
- Date of birth: June 18, 1998 (age 28)
- Height: 5 ft 9 in (1.75 m)
- Position: Center back

Youth career
- Beach FC

College career
Years	Team	Apps	(Gls)
2016–2021	Long Beach State Beach	70	(7)

Senior career*
Years	Team	Apps	(Gls)
2022	North Carolina Courage	0	(0)
2023	Tijuana	7	(0)
- * Club domestic league appearances and goals as of 00:43, February 24, 2026 (UTC)

Kaitlin Danielle Fregulia (born June 18, 1998) is an American former professional soccer player who played as a defender. She played college soccer for the Long Beach State Beach before being selected in the first round of the 2022 NWSL Draft by the North Carolina Courage. She also previously played for Mexican Liga MX Femenil club Tijuana.

== Early life ==
Fregulia grew up in Torrance, California. She played seven years of club soccer for Beach FC, where she led the team to a US Soccer youth national title in 2014 and two regional championship titles. She attended West High School, where she scored a goal in her high school debut. She went on to lead the program to four straight league titles and one Southern CIF title. In her junior year, she was named first-team all-CIF and the league offensive MVP. As a senior, she was named West's team captain.

== College career ==
As a member of Beach FC, Fregulia played for Long Beach State assistant coach Jeff Joyner and often practiced on the Cal State Long Beach campus with her teammates. In 2016, she joined the university's team after graduating from high school. She entered the program as a forward or outside back, but was converted to center back by Long Beach State coach Mauricio Ingrassia. Fregulia initially struggled with the position change, but eventually gained confidence and earned both a spot on the Big West all-freshman team and an all-Big West honorable mention at the end of her freshman season. She scored her first collegiate goal on August 29, 2016, contributing to a 3–0 victory over San Diego. On November 6, she scored Long Beach State's game-winner against UC Irvine in the Big West Tournament final.

In her sophomore season, Fregulia made 14 appearances before picking up a season-ending knee injury. She had recorded two goals (both of which were game-winners) and two assists in that timeframe. Despite missing the end of the season, she was named the Big West Defensive Player of the Year. Fregulia went on to miss nearly two years of action before returning to the field in 2019 and putting on a season in which she was named second-team All-Big West after starting every game.

The 2020 season was canceled due to the COVID-19 pandemic. In 2021, Fregulia captained the team, leading Long Beach State from central defense in all 18 games. She was named Big West Co-Defensive Player of the Year and first-team All-Big West. She also earned her second All-West region second team honor (her first had come in her sophomore year). Fregulia departed from Long Beach State having made 70 appearances and scored 7 goals.

== Club career ==
Fregulia was selected by the North Carolina Courage in the first round of the 2022 NWSL Draft (twelfth overall). She became the third player from the Big West conference to be drafted into the NWSL (after Mexican internationals Christina Burkenroad and Kiana Palacios) and first-ever from Cal State Long Beach. On February 7, 2022, the Courage announced that they had signed Fregulia to her first professional contract, a one-year deal with an option for 2023. Fregulia spent North Carolina's preseason and 2022 NWSL Challenge Cup campaign sidelined by an injury. On April 28, she was waived one day before the Courage's regular season opener against Angel City FC.

In February 2023, Fregulia signed for Mexican side Club Tijuana near the end of the Liga MX Femenil transfer window. She earned her first professional minutes for Tijuana, including in the team's 1–0 victory over Guadalajara in May 2023 to round out the Clausura phase of Tijuana's season.

On August 18, 2023, Fregulia announced her retirement from professional soccer due to health concerns.

== Personal life ==
In November 2023, Fregulia got engaged to Portland Timbers and Canada men's national team player Zac McGraw. The couple welcomed their first child, a son, on January 29, 2025.

== Honors and awards ==
Long Beach State Beach

- Big West Conference: 2018
- Big West Conference women's soccer tournament: 2016, 2018

Individual

- First-team All-Big West: 2021
- Second-team All-Big West: 2019
- Big West all-freshman team: 2016
- Big West Conference Defensive Player of the Year: 2017, 2021
