= 2025 Big West Conference women's soccer tournament =

2025 Big West Conference Women's soccer tournament
- Classification: Division I
- Teams: 6
- Matches: 5
- Attendance: 2,321
- Site: Matador Soccer Field; Northridge, CA
- Champions: Cal Poly (4th title)
- Winning coach: Bernardo Silva (1st title)
- MVP: Jessie Halladay (Cal Poly)
- Broadcast: ESPN+
Big West Conference Women's soccer tournament
«2024	2026»

2025 Big West Conference women's soccer standings
	Conf.						Overall
Team	W		L		T	PCT	W		L		T	PCT
Cal State Northridge ‍†‍‍	6	–	1	–	3	.750	8	–	7	–	5	.525
Cal Poly ‍‍‡‍^{y}	6	–	2	–	2	.700	10	–	3	–	9	.659
Cal State Fullerton ‍‍‍	6	–	2	–	2	.700	14	–	3	–	3	.775
UC Irvine ‍‍‍	5	–	2	–	3	.650	8	–	5	–	7	.575
UC Santa Barbara ‍‍‍	5	–	2	–	3	.650	13	–	5	–	5	.674
Cal State Bakersfield ‍‍‍	5	–	4	–	1	.550	8	–	9	–	2	.474
UC San Diego ‍‍‍	3	–	3	–	4	.500	5	–	6	–	8	.474
Long Beach St ‍‍‍	2	–	4	–	4	.400	5	–	8	–	5	.417
Hawaii ‍‍‍	2	–	4	–	4	.400	4	–	8	–	8	.400
UC Davis ‍‍‍	1	–	8	–	1	.150	3	–	12	–	4	.263
UC Riverside ‍‍‍	0	–	9	–	1	.050	0	–	16	–	2	.056
† – Conference champion ‡ – 2025 Big West Tournament champion y – Invited to the NCAA Tournament; As of December 9, 2025; Rankings from United Soccer Coaches Poll; Source:The Big West Conference

The 2025 Big West Conference women's soccer tournament was the postseason women's soccer tournament for the Big West Conference, held from November 2 to November 9, 2025. The five–match tournament featured a six–team, single–elimination format consisting of three rounds, with seeding based on regular season conference records. First round matches were hosted by the higher seeds, while the semifinals and final were held at Matador Soccer Field in Northridge, California.

The defending champions were the UC Santa Barbara Gauchos. The Gauchos advanced to the final after defeating UC Irvine and CSUN (Cal State Northridge), but were unable to defend their title, losing to Cal Poly in the championship match. As tournament champions, Cal Poly earned the Big West Conference's automatic berth to the 2025 NCAA Division I women's soccer tournament, where they faced eventual national runners-up Stanford.

== Seeding ==
The top six teams in the regular season qualified for the tournament, with seeds determined by conference record. Tiebreakers were required to determine the second and third seeds, as well as the fourth and fifth seeds. Cal Poly and Cal State Fullerton both finished the regular season with 6–2–2 records. Cal Poly was awarded the second seed and a first–round bye by virtue of their 2–0 victory over Cal State Fullerton on October 12. Additionally, UC Irvine and UC Santa Barbara both finished with 5–2–3 regular season records. UC Irvine earned the fourth seed by virtue of their 2–0 regular season win over UC Santa Barbara on October 16, and the right to host UC Santa Barbara in the first round.

Seed	School	Conference Record	Points
1	CSUN	6–1–3	21
2	Cal Poly	6–2–2	20
3	Cal State Fullerton	6–2–2	20
4	UC Irvine	5–2–3	18
5	UC Santa Barbara	5–2–3	18
6	Cal State Bakersfield	5–4–1	16

== Bracket ==
First round Sunday, Nov. 2
4	UC Irvine	0
5	UC Santa Barbara	1
3	Cal State Fullerton	1
6	Cal State Bakersfield	0

Semifinals; Thursday, Nov. 6
1	CSUN	1 (2)
5	UC Santa Barbara (p)	1 (3)
2	Cal Poly	1
3	Cal State Fullerton	0

Final; Sunday, Nov. 9
5	UC Santa Barbara	0
2	Cal Poly	1

== Schedule ==
=== Quarterfinals ===
November 3, 2024	#3 Cal State Fullerton	1–0	#6 Cal State Bakersfield	Fullerton, CA
5:00 p.m. PST	CSUF Team 88'	Report		Stadium: Titan Stadium; Attendance: 501; Referee: Adrian Gonzalez; Assistant referees: Blanca Viviana Diaz Rodriguez, Ana Valdez; Fourth official: Abdel Hakeem Wakil

November 3, 2024	#4 UC Irvine	0–1	#5 UC Santa Barbara	Irvine, CA
6:00 p.m. PST		Report	51' Emily Caughey	Stadium: Anteater Stadium; Attendance: 422; Referee: Randy Hoffman; Assistant referees: Haily Morejon, Maria Magana; Fourth official: Julio Carranza

=== Semifinals ===
November 6, 2024	#2 Cal Poly	1–0	#3 Cal State Fullerton	Northridge, CA
4:00 p.m. PST	74' Jessie Halladay; Brennan Cole (yellow card) 57'	Report	Jenae Perez (yellow card) 65'	Stadium: Matador Soccer Field; Attendance: 411; Referee: Rene Nunez; Assistant referees: Morgan Abbitt, Tomik Baghramian; Fourth official: Marissa Postlethwaite

November 6, 2024	#1 Cal State Northridge	1–1 (a.e.t.) (2–3 p)	#5 UC Santa Barbara	Northridge, CA
7:00 p.m. PST	15' Emma Corcoran	Report	88' Paige Califf	Stadium: Matador Soccer Field; Attendance: 506; Referee: Ivan De Cristofaro; Assistant referees: Andie Reyes, Nancy Camarillo; Fourth official: Abdu Razzaq Juma
	Penalties
	Olivia Howard (penalty scored); Sophia Moness (penalty missed); Isabella Ong (penalty scored); Emma Corcoran (penalty missed); Ava Dermott (penalty scored)		Paige Califf (penalty scored); Cailey Jackson (penalty missed); Jordyn Canister (penalty scored); Lia Peterson (penalty missed); Cassidy Imperial-Pham (penalty missed)

=== Final ===
November 9, 2025	#2 Cal Poly	1–0	#5 UC Santa Barbara	Northridge, CA
1:00 p.m. PST	88' Jessie Halladay	Report		Stadium: Matador Soccer Field; Attendance: 481; Referee: Amber O'Connor; Assistant referees: Kristin Patterson, Jaclyn Reilman; Fourth official: Ana Valdez

== Statistics ==
=== Goalscorers ===
There were 6 goals scored in 5 matches, for an average of 1.2 goals per match (as of November 10).

2 goals

- Jessie Halladay

1 goal

- Paige Califf
- Emily Caughey
- Emma Corcoran
- CSUF Women's Soccer Team
