= Yuna McCormack =

American soccer player (born 2004)

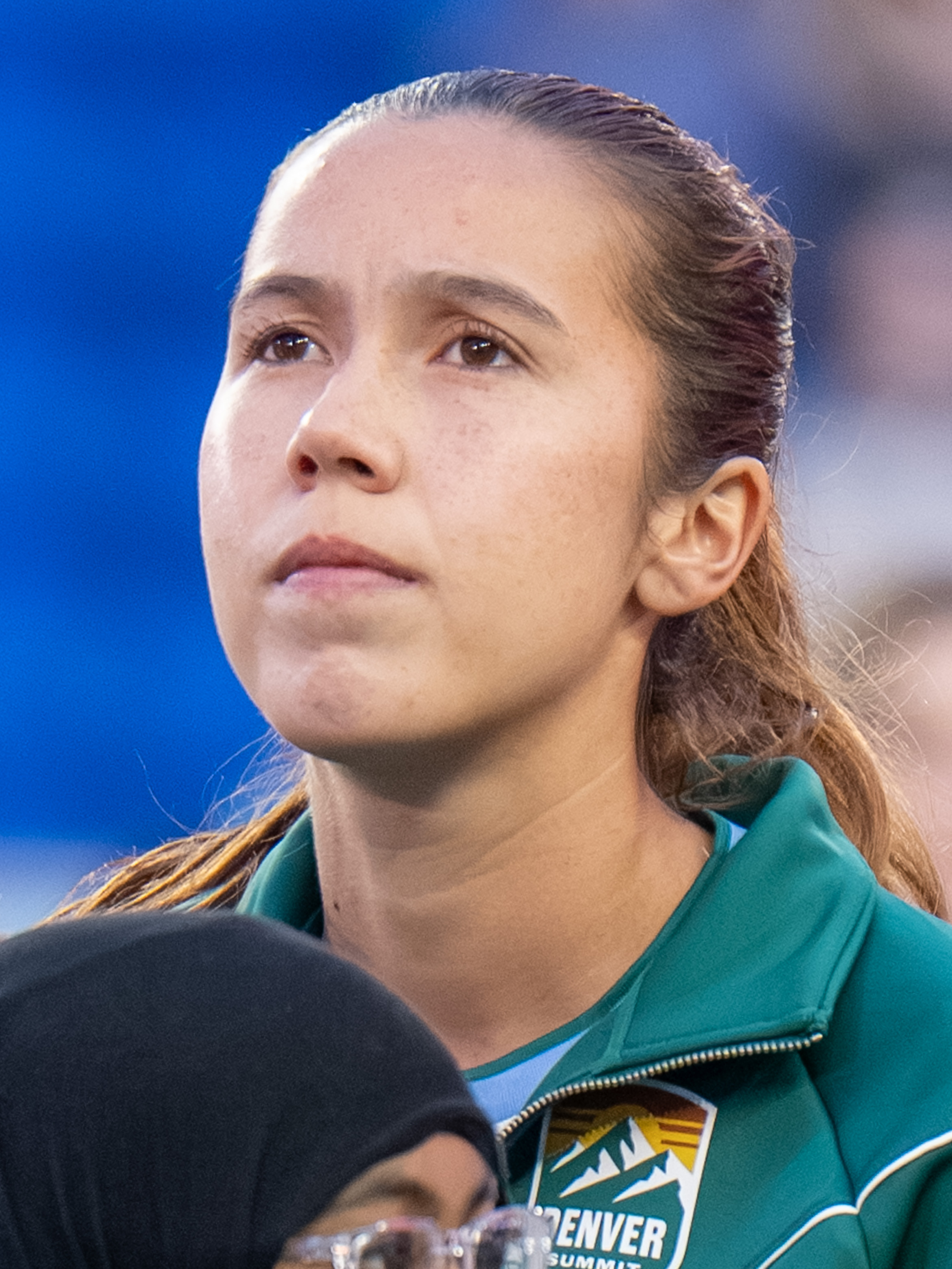
- McCormack with the Denver Summit in 2026

Personal information
- Full name: Yuna Carole McCormack
- Date of birth: November 3, 2004 (age 22)
- Height: 5 ft 9 in (1.75 m)
- Position: Midfielder

Team information
- Current team: Denver Summit
- Number: 14

College career
Years	Team	Apps	(Gls)
2023–2024	Virginia Cavaliers	28	(3)
2025	Florida State Seminoles	22	(6)

Senior career*
Years	Team	Apps	(Gls)
2023–2024	San Francisco Glens	5	(1)
2026–	Denver Summit	20	(0)

International career^{‡}
- United States U-15
2020	United States U-16	3	(1)
2024	United States U-20	9	(2)
2026–	United States U-23	1	(0)
Medal record
Women's soccer
FIFA U-20 Women's World Cup
Bronze medal – third place	Colombia 2024
- * Club domestic league appearances and goals as of 06:39, November 8, 2026 (UTC) ‡ National team caps and goals as of 14:13, March 8, 2026 (UTC)

Yuna Carole McCormack (born November 3, 2004) is an American professional soccer player who plays as a midfielder for Denver Summit FC of the National Women's Soccer League (NWSL). She played college soccer for the Virginia Cavaliers and the Florida State Seminoles, winning the 2025 national championship with the Seminoles. She won bronze with the United States at the 2024 FIFA U-20 Women's World Cup.

== Early life ==
McCormack grew up in Mill Valley, California. She began playing soccer at age six and joined Mill Valley Soccer Club up two age levels when she was seven. She later played club soccer for Marin FC and Bay Area Surf (previously the San Jose Earthquakes academy). She played one season for Tamalpais High School as a junior in 2021–22, scoring 13 goals in 16 games. She was ranked as the second-best midfielder of the 2023 class by TopDrawerSoccer. McCormack also played in the USL W League for the San Francisco Glens, helping them win both the NorCal Division and Western Conference titles in 2023.

== College career ==
McCormack started every game for the Virginia Cavaliers in her freshman season in 2023, filling in the spot that belonged to injured All-American Lia Godfrey. She scored 1 goal with 5 assists in 17 games, being named to the Atlantic Coast Conference (ACC) all-freshman team. She scored 2 goals with 2 assists in 11 games in her sophomore season in 2024, missing about a month while at the FIFA U-20 Women's World Cup. After deciding between turning professional and transferring, she joined the Florida State Seminoles for her junior season in 2025. She played a large role for the Seminoles, scoring 6 goals with 3 assists in 22 games, as they won their fifth national championship, winning 1–0 against Stanford in the final. She then decided to go pro and give up her final year of college eligibility.

== Club career ==
NWSL expansion team Denver Summit FC announced on January 10, 2026, that they had signed McCormack to her first professional contract on a three-year deal. She made her professional debut as a second-half substitute for Ally Brazier in the Summit's inaugural game, a 2–1 loss to Bay FC on March 14.

== International career ==
McCormack was called into training camp with the United States national under-14 team in 2018. Later that year, she was part of the under-15 team that won the 2018 CONCACAF Girls' U-15 Championship. She appeared for the under-16s at the UEFA Development Tournament in England in 2020. Eligible to represent her mother's nation of Japan, she was called up to its youth team as a training player but did not appear in a match for the country.

McCormack debuted for the United States under-20 team during a pair of friendlies at the team's last camp before the 2024 FIFA U-20 Women's World Cup and was selected to the tournament roster. She scored two goals at the tournament, opening in a 2–0 win over Morocco and netting in a 7–0 win over Paraguay. The United States finished in third place, its best result since 2012. She was called up by Emma Hayes into Futures Camp, practicing alongside the senior national team, in January 2025.

== Personal life ==
McCormack is one of two children born to Michael and Etsuko McCormack. She is of Japanese descent on her mother's side. Her father, a professional triathlete from Boston, won the Ironman Canada race in 1991 and 1995 and placed second at Ironman Japan in 1997.

== Honors and awards ==
Florida State Seminoles

- NCAA Division I women's soccer tournament: 2025

Individual

- ACC all-freshman team: 2023
