= 2025 NCAA Division I women's soccer tournament =

2025 NCAA women's soccer tournament
Women's College Cup (Semifinals & Final)

Tournament details
- Country: United States
- Dates: November 14 – December 8, 2025
- Teams: 64

Final positions
- Champions: (3) Florida State (5th title)
- Runners-up: (1) Stanford
- Semifinalists: (2) TCU; (2) Duke

Tournament statistics
- Matches played: 63
- Goals scored: 192 (3.05 per match)
- Attendance: 93,767 (1,488 per match)
- Top goal scorers: (United States) Jasmine Aikey, Stanford, (6 goals); (United States) Mia Minestrella, Duke, (6 goals)

Awards
- Most Outstanding Player: Wrianna Hudson, Florida State (Offensive); Kate Ockene, Florida State (Defensive)
- All statistics correct as of 12/08/2025.

The 2025 NCAA Division I women's soccer tournament was the 44th edition of the NCAA Division I women's soccer tournament, a postseason tournament to determine the national champion of NCAA Division I women's college soccer. The College Cup was played on December 5 and December 8 at CPKC Stadium in Kansas City, Missouri, and televised on ESPNU.

North Carolina were the defending national champion. North Carolina received an unseeded, at-large bid, and was unable to defend their title falling to TCU in penalties in the Round of 16.

Three teams from the Atlantic Coast Conference (ACC) and one team from the Big 12 Conference qualified for the college cup, and Florida State prevailed, claiming their fifth college cup.

== Qualification ==
All Division I women's soccer programs were eligible to qualify for the tournament. 29 teams received automatic bids by winning their conference tournaments, 1 team received an automatic bid by claiming the conference regular season crown (West Coast Conference doesn't hold a conference tournament), and an additional 34 teams earned at-large bids based on their regular season records.

Automatic bids
Conference	Team	Date qualified	Record	Appearance	Last Bid
American	UTSA	November 9	10–5–6	3rd	2022
America East	Maine	November 9	6–7–4	3rd	2024
ACC	Stanford	November 9	16–1–2	34th	2024
Atlantic 10	Dayton	November 9	15–3–3	11th	2016
ASUN	Lipscomb	November 9	14–5–2	5th	2024
Big East	Xavier	November 9	15–3–2	7th	2023
Big Sky	Montana	November 9	12–3–5	7th	2021
Big South	High Point	November 9	5–9–5	8th	2021
Big Ten	Washington	November 9	13–2–6	17th	2024
Big 12	BYU	November 8	11–6–4	26th	2024
Big West	Cal Poly	November 9	10–2–9	6th	2004
CAA	Elon	November 9	11–2–7	3rd	2020
C-USA	Liberty	November 7	14–3–4	9th	2023
Horizon	Milwaukee	November 8	13–4–3	19th	2024
Ivy	Dartmouth	November 9	11–3–4	11th	2005
MAAC	Sacred Heart	November 9	11–8–2	2nd	2001
MAC	Western Michigan	November 7	16–3–1	5th	2024
Missouri Valley	UIC	November 9	8–7–6	1st	None
Mountain West	Utah State	November 8	10–6–6	5th	2024
Northeast	Wagner	November 9	11–2–6	1st	None
Ohio Valley	Tennessee Tech	November 9	7–6–8	2nd	2000
Patriot	Army West Point	November 9	14–5–2	3rd	2011
SEC	LSU	November 9	13–6–3	11th	2024
SoCon	Samford	November 9	13–2–5	9th	2024
Southland	Houston Christian	November 9	12–8–2	3rd	2016
Summit League	South Dakota State	November 9	13–2–6	9th	2024
Sun Belt	Texas State	November 8	10–3–7	6th	2011
SWAC	Grambling State	November 9	10–6–5	3rd	2023
WAC	California Baptist	November 8	12–8–2	2nd	2024
West Coast	Pepperdine	November 8	11–6–2	15th	2024

At-Large Bids
Conference	Team	Record	Appearance	Last Bid
American	Memphis	16–0–3	13th	2023
ACC	Clemson	7–5–5	25th	2023
ACC	Duke	13–4–1	30th	2024
ACC	Florida State	10–2–4	26th	2024
ACC	Louisville	13–4–2	7th	2019
ACC	North Carolina	12–6–0	44th	2024
ACC	Notre Dame	14–1–3	31st	2024
ACC	Virginia	12–3–4	37th	2024
ACC	Wake Forest	10–4–4	24th	2024
Big East	Georgetown	15–3–2	16th	2024
Big Ten	Illinois	13–5–2	13th	2013
Big Ten	Iowa	11–4–4	6th	2024
Big Ten	Michigan State	12–3–6	8th	2024
Big Ten	Northwestern	9–4–7	8th	2024
Big Ten	Ohio State	8–4–6	19th	2022
Big Ten	Penn State	9–7–3	31st	2024
Big Ten	UCLA	11–5–3	29th	2024
Big Ten	Wisconsin	13–5–2	26th	2024
Big 12	Baylor	12–4–4	7th	2018
Big 12	Colorado	15–3–3	15th	2024
Big 12	Kansas	14–5–3	11th	2024
Big 12	TCU	15–2–2	9th	2024
Big 12	Texas Tech	13–2–4	10th	2024
Big 12	UCF	11–3–5	23rd	2022
Big 12	West Virginia	13–3–3	24th	2024
SEC	Arkansas	9–4–4	12th	2024
SEC	Alabama	11–8–1	7th	2023
SEC	Georgia	11–4–5	13th	2024
SEC	Kentucky	12–5–3	13th	2024
SEC	Mississippi State	12–6–1	5th	2024
SEC	South Carolina	10–4–5	19th	2024
SEC	Tennessee	12–3–3	17th	2024
SEC	Vanderbilt	16–3–1	14th	2024
WAC	Utah Valley	14–4–3	5th	2022

== Bracket ==
The bracket was announced on Monday, November 10, 2025. First round games were played on November 14 and 15 at the campus site of the seeded team.

=== Notre Dame bracket ===
First round Campus Sites
1	Notre Dame*	4
UIC	0
Ohio State	2
8	Georgia*	0
5	Baylor*	3
Texas State	0
Western Michigan	2
4	Wisconsin*	3
3	Florida State*	4
Samford	0
Lipscomb	1
6	Mississippi State*	0
7	West Virginia*	5
Wagner	0
Sacred Heart	0
2	Georgetown*	3

Second round Regional Campus Sites
1	Notre Dame*	0
Ohio State (a.e.t.)	1
5	Baylor	1
4	Wisconsin	0
3	Florida State	1
Lipscomb	0
7	West Virginia	1 (3)
2	Georgetown (pen.)	1 (4)

Round of 16; Regional Campus Sites
Ohio State (a.e.t.)	2
5	Baylor	1
3	Florida State	3
2	Georgetown*	1

Quarterfinal; Campus Sites
Ohio State	1
3	Florida State*	4

* Host institution

==== Schedule ====
===== First round =====
November 14	(8) Georgia	0–2	Ohio State	Athens, GA
3:00 p.m. EST		Report	9' Amanda Schlueter; 69' Riley Lijewski	Stadium: Turner Soccer Complex; Attendance: 1,203; Referee: Benjamin Oakley; Assistant referees: Alexandru Focea; Kevin Huet; Fourth official: Wesley Williams

November 14	(3) Florida State	4–0	Samford	Tallahassee, FL
5:00 p.m. EST	Yuna McCormack 11'; Taylor Suarez 49'; Wrianna Hudson 61'; Lara Dantas 79'	Report	(yellow card) 64' Martha Bishop	Stadium: Seminole Soccer Complex; Attendance: 1,517; Referee: Benjamin Meyer; Assistant referees: Dean Morgan; Godwin Sevor; Fourth official: Mario Maric

November 14	(2) Georgetown	3–0	Sacred Heart	Washington, D.C.
6:30 p.m. EST	Natalie Means 18', 63'; Shay Montgomery 27'	Report		Stadium: Shaw Field; Attendance: 537; Referee: Danielle Cornetta; Assistant referees: Sami Card; Elena Dauphinais; Fourth official: Stephen Foster

November 14	(7) West Virginia	5–0	Wagner	Morgantown, WV
7:00 p.m. EST	Anna Hauer 1' (pen.); Abbey Olexa 22', 57'; Alicia Riggins 40', 42'	Report		Stadium: Dick Dlesk Soccer Stadium; Attendance: 736; Referee: Cedrick Cook; Assistant referees: Ashley Smyda; Taylor Bombalski; Fourth official: Scarlet Agrawal

November 14	(5) Baylor	3–0	Texas State	Waco, TX
8:00 p.m. EST	Kai Hayes 36'; Hallie Augustyn 61'; Olivia Hess 66'	Report		Stadium: Betty Lou Mays Soccer Field; Attendance: 827; Referee: Gloria Martinez Resendiz; Assistant referees: Chana Forstall; Xiana Pang-Abbs; Fourth official: Kaitlyn Trowbridge

November 14	(4) Wisconsin	3–2	Western Michigan	Madison, WI
8:00 p.m. EST	Erin Connolly 58' (pen.), 72'; Ashley Martinez (yellow card) 77'; Adee Boer 80'	Report	24' Abby Smothers; 81' Meredith Vance	Stadium: McClimmon Soccer Complex; Attendance: 826; Referee: Peter Bernardy; Assistant referees: Eulogio Villalpando; Ryan Birdsall; Fourth official: Ryan Shanklin

November 15	(6) Mississippi State	0–1	Lipscomb	Starkville, MS
6:00 p.m. EST		Report	32' Bella Carapazza; (yellow card) 55' Annessa Shively; (yellow card) 90' Maddy Rhodes	Stadium: MSU Soccer Park; Attendance: 1,590; Referee: Alexander Connelly; Assistant referees: Laith Dahhan; Laadi Issaka; Fourth official: Dorian Del Toro

November 15	(1) Notre Dame	4–0	UIC	Notre Dame, IN
6:00 p.m. EST	Tessa Knapp 7'; Charlie Codd 64', 84'; Ellie Hodsden 90'	Report		Stadium: Alumni Stadium; Attendance: 1,296; Referee: Ryan Homik; Assistant referees: Race Williams; Fernando Pina; Fourth official: Abdu Bensalah

===== Second round =====
November 20	(3) Florida State	1–0	Lipscomb	Washington, D.C.
2:00 p.m. EST	Heather Gilchrist 24'	Report		Stadium: Shaw Field; Attendance: 413; Referee: Marie Durr; Assistant referees: Josh Pitt; Amelia Graytock; Fourth official: Scarlet Agrawal

November 20	(4) Wisconsin	0–1	(5) Baylor	Notre Dame, IN
2:00 p.m. EST	UW Team (yellow card) 85'	Report	(yellow card) 23' Kai Hayes; 45' Tyler Isgrig	Stadium: Alumni Stadium; Attendance: 100; Referee: Erin Patterson; Assistant referees: Khalaf Al-Latayfeh Malkawi; Khary Williams; Fourth official: Abdu Bensalah

November 20	(7) West Virginia	1–1 (a.e.t.) (3–4 p)	(2) Georgetown	Washington, D.C.
5:00 p.m. EST	Ajanae Respass 3'	Report	23' Lizzie Heller; (yellow card) 104' GU Team	Stadium: Shaw Field; Attendance: 834; Referee: Meghan Mullen; Assistant referees: Ariel Raban; Taylor Heemstra; Fourth official: Alla Stepanov
	Penalties
	Anna Hauer (penalty scored); Nyema Ingleton (penalty scored); Maya Leoni (penalty missed); Mackenzie Smith (penalty scored); Ava Arnold (penalty missed)		(penalty scored) Shay Montgomery; (penalty scored) Henley Tippins; (penalty missed) Maja Lardner; (penalty scored) Lizzie Heller; (penalty scored) Natalie Means

November 20	(1) Notre Dame	0–1 (a.e.t.)	Ohio State	Notre Dame, IN
6:00 p.m. EST		Report	(yellow card) 102' Ava Bramblett; 110' Jadin Bonham	Stadium: Alumni Stadium; Attendance: 1,009; Referee: Aaron Hernandez; Assistant referees: Laura Snyder; Shawn Westerfield; Fourth official: John Kennedy

===== Round of 16 =====
November 23	(2) Georgetown	1–3	(3) Florida State	Washington, D.C.
12:00 PM EST	Mary Cochran 58'	Report	40' Mimi Van Zanten; 47' Nyanya Touray; 78' Jaida McGrew	Stadium: Shaw Field; Attendance: 1,625; Referee: John Griggs; Assistant referees: Ashley Smyda; Taylor Bombalski; Fourth official: Andrea Pileri

November 23	(5) Baylor	1–2 (a.e.t.)	Ohio State	Notre Dame, IN
2:00 PM EST	Kai Hayes (yellow card) 50' (goal) 70'	Report	65' Amanda Schlueter; 105' Anika Poremba	Stadium: Alumni Stadium; Attendance: 202; Referee: Alex Beehler; Assistant referees: Marcus Barnett; Miklos Hendricks; Fourth official: Dylan Seitz

===== Quarterfinals =====
November 28	(3) Florida State	4–1	Ohio State	Tallahassee, FL
5:00 PM EST	Jordynn Dudley 36', 40'; Yuna McCormack 51'; Wrianna Hudson 85'	Report	50' Amanda Schlueter	Stadium: Seminole Soccer Complex; Attendance: 2,408; Referee: Elvis Osmanovic; Assistant referees: Sam Bilbo; Kenan Mehmedic; Fourth official: Arnel Selman

Rankings shown are seeds in this bracket of the tournament.

=== Vanderbilt bracket ===
First round Campus Sites
2	TCU*	7
Grambling	0
Illinois	1
7	Memphis*	2
6	Texas Tech*	2
UTSA	1
North Carolina	3
3	Tennessee*	1
4	LSU*	4
Houston Christian	1
South Dakota State	0
5	Iowa*	1
8	Clemson*	2
Liberty	1
Tennessee Tech	0
1	Vanderbilt*	2

Second round Regional Campus Sites
2	TCU*	4
7	Memphis	0
6	Texas Tech	1 (3)
North Carolina (pen.)	1 (4)
4	LSU	2
5	Iowa	1
8	Clemson	2
1	Vanderbilt* (a.e.t.)	3

Round of 16; Regional Campus Sites
2	TCU* (pen.)	1 (4)
North Carolina	1 (3)
4	LSU	0
1	Vanderbilt*	1

Quarterfinal; Campus Sites
2	TCU (a.e.t.)	2
1	Vanderbilt*	1

* Host institution

==== Schedule ====
===== First round =====
November 14	(8) Clemson	2–1	Liberty	Clemson, SC
6:00 p.m. EST	Elle Bissinger 19'; Taylor Leib 82'; Tatum Short (yellow card) 90'	Report	20' Ivy Garner	Stadium: Riggs Field; Attendance: 962; Referee: Kyle Johnson; Assistant referees: Jason Kent; Wilmer Soriano; Fourth official: Kevin Broadley

November 14	(5) Iowa	1–0	South Dakota State	Iowa City, IA
6:00 p.m. EST	Kenzie Roling 3'; Fernanda Mayrink (yellow card) 50'	Report		Stadium: UI Soccer Complex; Attendance: 2,711; Referee: Alex Hofstetter; Assistant referees: Jared Kuehl; Aaron Valley; Fourth official: Esad Omanovic

November 14	(3) Tennessee	1–3	North Carolina	Knoxville, TN
6:00 p.m. EST	Kate Runyon 27'; (yellow card) 67' Reese Mattern; (yellow card) 84' Sarah Kate Rath	Report	30', 58' Kate Faasse; 36' Caitlin Mara	Stadium: Regal Soccer Stadium; Attendance: 1,721; Referee: Dorian Del Toro; Assistant referees: Logan Busby; Mary Fernandez; Fourth official: Christopher Heintzman

November 14	(6) Texas Tech	2–1	UTSA	Lubbock, TX
7:00 p.m. EST	Peyton Parsons 14'; Taylor Zdrojewski 77'	Report	61' Jasmine Kessler; (yellow card) 75' Leah Varela	Stadium: John Walker Soccer Complex; Attendance: 1,299; Referee: Travis Haight; Assistant referees: Eric Guzman; Chris Danfour; Fourth official: Brandon Queri

November 14	(4) LSU	4–1	Houston Christian	Baton Rouge, LA
8:00 p.m. EST	Sariyah Bailey 26', 81'; Gabbi Ceballos 50'; Ída Marín Hermannsdóttir 80'	Report	68' Ella Remy	Stadium: LSU Soccer Stadium; Attendance: 2,132; Referee: Sean Caouette; Assistant referees: Sam Bilbo; Jalen Gray; Fourth official: Jordan Gray

November 14	(2) TCU	7–0	Grambling	Fort Worth, TX
8:00 p.m. EST	Seven Castain 11', 61', 68'; Emma Yolinsky 22', 53'; Cameron Patton 78'; Grace Vest 85' (pen.)	Report	(yellow card) 67' Aaniyah Frye	Stadium: Garvey-Rosenthal Stadium; Attendance: 700; Referee: Habeeb Hooshmand; Assistant referees: Emily Gomez; Joshua Ell; Fourth official: Tim Debysingh

November 14	(1) Vanderbilt	2–0	Tennessee Tech	Nashville, TN
8:00 p.m. EST	Courtney Jones 56'; Mary Beth McLaughlin 61'	Report		Stadium: Vanderbilt Soccer/Lacrosse Complex; Attendance: 1,277; Referee: Celeste Roberts; Assistant referees: Lila Remache; Samantha Burket; Fourth official: Jessica Medley

November 15	(7) Memphis	2–1	Illinois	Memphis, TN
8:00 p.m. EST	Ai Kitagawa 12', 45'; Evelyn Mackay (yellow card) 83'	Report	Ellen Persson (yellow card) 8'; Sydney Stephens 27'	Stadium: Mike Rose Soccer Complex; Attendance: 1,801; Referee: Kylie Rhodes; Assistant referees: Jessica Hoeft; Logan Reeves; Fourth official: Melinda Homa

===== Second round =====
November 21	(4) LSU	2–1	(5) Iowa	Memphis, TN
3:00 p.m. EST	Ída Marín Hermannsdóttir 17' (pen.); Ava Galligan 66'; Jocelyn Ollivierre (yellow card) 71'	Report	14' Elle Wildman	Stadium: Mike Rose Soccer Complex; Attendance: 110; Referee: Amin Hadzic; Assistant referees: Deny Kulasinac; Jessica Hoeft; Fourth official: Don Eubank

November 21	(6) Texas Tech	1–1 (a.e.t.) (3–4 p)	North Carolina	Fort Worth, TX
5:00 p.m. EST	Macy Blackburn 60'	Report	58' Linda Ullmark; (yellow card) 85' Kate Faasse	Stadium: Garvey-Rosenthal Stadium; Attendance: 0 Referee: Daniel Radford; Assistant referees: Aaron Donahoe; Jason Guillen; Fourth official: Muhammad Kaleia
	Penalties
	Macy Blackburn (penalty missed); Peyton Parsons (penalty scored); Sam Courtwright (penalty scored); Taylor Zdrojewski (penalty scored); Millie Elwood (penalty missed)		(penalty scored) Kate Faasse; (penalty scored) Tessa Dellarose; (penalty scored) Lauren Malsom; (penalty missed) Linda Ullmark; (penalty scored) Olivia Thomas

November 21	(2) TCU	4–0	(7) Memphis	Fort Worth, TX
8:00 p.m. EST	Seven Castain 2', 42'; Katana Norman 10'; Sydney Becerra 12'; Evelyn Mackay (yellow card) 59'	Report		Stadium: Garvey-Rosenthal Stadium; Attendance: 1,543; Referee: Travis Haight; Assistant referees: Chris Danfort; Emily Gomez; Fourth official: Gloria Martinez Resendiz

November 21	(1) Vanderbilt	3–2 (a.e.t.)	(8) Clemson	Nashville, TN
7:00 p.m. EST	Sydney Watts 55'; Mary Beth McLaughlin 57'; VU Team (yellow card) 68'; Maci Teater (yellow card) 89'; Adysen Armenta 107'	Report	1' (pen.) Renee Lyles; (yellow card) 32' Renee Lyles; 65' Anna Castenfelt	Stadium: Vanderbilt Soccer/Lacrosse Complex; Attendance: 635; Referee: Dorian Del Torro; Assistant referees: Ryan Starr; Mary Fernandez; Fourth official: Eric Phillips

===== Round of 16 =====
November 24	(2) TCU	1–1 (a.e.t.) (4–3 p)	North Carolina	Fort Worth, TX
2:00 PM EST	Katana Norman (yellow card) 32'; Kamdyn Fuller 90'; Kaela Martinez (yellow card) 75'	Report	(yellow card) 33' Bella Gaetino; 82' Bella Devey	Stadium: Garvey-Rosenthal Stadium; Attendance: 1,684; Referee: Alexander Connelly; Assistant referees: Tiffini Turpin; Fevzi Demirhan; Fourth official: Brandon Queri
	Penalties
	Sydney Becerra (penalty scored); Seven Castain (penalty scored); Kamdyn Fuller (penalty missed); Cate Sarinopoulos (penalty scored); AJ Hennessey (penalty scored)		(penalty missed) Kate Faasse; (penalty scored) Tessa Dellarose; (penalty scored) Lauren Malsom; (penalty missed) Olivia Thomas; (penalty scored) Bella Gaetino

November 24	(1) Vanderbilt	1–0	(4) LSU	Nashville, TN
3:00 PM EST	Sydney Watts (yellow card) 57'; Melania Fullerton 65'; Hannah McLaughlin (yellow card) 73'	Report	(yellow card) 33' Ída Marín Hermannsdóttir	Stadium: Vanderbilt Soccer/Lacrosse Complex; Attendance: 1,005; Referee: Aaron Hernandez; Assistant referees: Jackson Krauser; Justin Higgins; Fourth official: Donovan Eubank

===== Quarterfinals =====
November 29	(1) Vanderbilt	1–2 (a.e.t.)	(2) TCU	Nashville, TN
7:30 PM EST	Reagan Pentz (yellow card) 63'; Sydney Watts 77'; Sara Wojdelko (yellow card) 86'; VU Team (yellow card) 88'	Report	(yellow card) 70' (goal) 86' Emma Yolinsky; (yellow card) 78' TCU Team; 96' (pen.) Sydney Becerra	Stadium: Vanderbilt Soccer/Lacrosse Complex; Attendance: 989; Referee: Nick Balcer; Assistant referees: Deny Kulsinac; Jessica Hoeft; Fourth official: Don Eubank

Rankings shown are seeds in this bracket of the tournament.

=== Stanford bracket ===
First round Campus Sites
1	Stanford*	3
Cal Poly	1
Northwestern	2 (1)
8	Alabama (pen.)*	2 (3)
5	BYU (pen.)*	1 (7)
Utah State	1 (6)
Pepperdine	1
4	UCLA*	3
3	Colorado (a.e.t.)*	2
Utah Valley	1
Dayton	0
6	Xavier*	2
7	Wake Forest*	2
South Carolina	1
Milwaukee	1
2	Michigan State*	4

Second round Regional Campus Sites
1	Stanford*	7
8	Alabama	3
5	BYU	1
4	UCLA	1
3	Colorado	4
6	Xavier	1
7	Wake Forest	0
2	Michigan State*	1

Round of 16; Regional Campus Sites
1	Stanford*	6
5	BYU	0
3	Colorado	1
2	Michigan State*	2

Quarterfinal; Campus Sites
1	Stanford*	5
2	Michigan State	1

* Host institution

==== Schedule ====
===== First round =====
November 14	(2) Michigan State	4–1	Milwaukee	East Lansing, MI
6:00 p.m. EST	Kennedy Bell (yellow card) 10' (goal) 20'; Kayla Briggs 54'; Emerson Sargeant 57'; Adelle Francis 68'	Report	77' Lola Wojcik	Stadium: DeMartin Soccer Complex; Attendance: 1,359; Referee: Alex Beehler; Assistant referees: Shane Richards; Miklos Hendricks; Fourth official: Doug Ferguson

November 14	(7) Wake Forest	2–1	South Carolina	Winston-Salem, NC
6:00 p.m. EST	Kylie Maxwell 15'; Sammi Wiemann 60'; Carly Wilson (yellow card) 76'	Report	(yellow card) 24' Gracie Falla; (yellow card) 29' Reagan Schubach; 64' Cuyler Zulauf	Stadium: Spry Stadium; Attendance: 1,824; Referee: Matthew Thompson; Assistant referees: Justin Howard; Amy Balbier; Fourth official: John Matto

November 14	(8) Alabama	2–2 (a.e.t.) (3–1 p)	Northwestern	Tuscaloosa, AL
7:00 p.m. EST	Larkin Thomason 68'; Maddie Padelski 85'	Report	28' Kennedy Roesch; 74' Megan Norkett; (yellow card) 81' Keira Wagner	Stadium: Alabama Soccer Stadium; Attendance: 936; Referee: Amin Hadzic; Assistant referees: Sam Bierster; Justin Higgins; Fourth official: Damir Setkic
	Penalties
	Nadia Ramadan (penalty scored); Larkin Thomason (penalty scored); Melina Rebimbas (penalty scored)		(penalty scored) Kennedy Roesch; (penalty missed) Caterina Regazzoni; (penalty missed) Liz Cardwell; (penalty missed) Megan Norkett

November 14	(5) BYU	1–1 (a.e.t.) (7–6 p)	Utah State	Provo, UT
8:00 p.m. EST	Mia Goettsche 19'; Afton Perry (yellow card) 99'	Report	53' Mia Mullenmeister; (yellow card) 101' Tess Werts	Stadium: South Field; Attendance: 3,566; Referee: Nathan Boone; Assistant referees: Josh Bertagnole; Kyler Baker; Fourth official: Jason Allen
	Penalties
	MacKenzee Vance (penalty missed); Ellie Walbruch (penalty scored); Izzi Stratton (penalty scored); Lucy Kesler (penalty missed); Mika Krommenhoek (penalty scored); Halle Dixon (penalty missed); Afton Perry (penalty scored); Mattyn Summers-Oviatt (penalty scored); Mia Lopez (penalty missed); Mia Goettsche (penalty scored); Izzi Stratton (penalty scored)		(penalty scored) Rachel Reitz; (penalty scored) Tess Werts; (penalty missed) Rine Yonaha; (penalty scored) Hadli Barrera; (penalty missed) Ellie Hendrix; (penalty missed) Mia Mullenmeister; (penalty scored) Samantha Sellers; (penalty scored) Summer Sofonia; (penalty missed) Capriel Winder; (penalty scored) Talia Winder; (penalty missed) Rachel Reitz

November 14	(3) Colorado	2–1 (a.e.t.)	Utah Valley	Boulder, CO
9:00 p.m. EST	CU Team (yellow card) 31'; Vivi Zacarias 39'; Reagan Kotschau 106'	Report	5' Bailey Peterson	Stadium: Prentup Field; Attendance: 2,171; Referee: Jared Mosher; Assistant referees: Jacob Herold; Jae Lehman; Fourth official: Brian Yip

November 14	(1) Stanford	3–1	Cal Poly	Stanford, CA
9:00 p.m. EST	Shae Harvey 7'; Joelle Jung 37'; Charlotte Kohler 46'	Report	1', (yellow card) 72' Jessie Halladay; (yellow card) 43' Brennan Cole	Stadium: Cagan Stadium; Attendance: 1,920; Referee: Iryna Petrunok; Assistant referees: Jessica Peralta; Isai Baltezar; Fourth official: Victor Mba

November 15	(6) Xavier	2–0	Dayton	Cincinnati, OH
6:30 p.m. EST	Regan Dancer 53'; Elin Hansson 54'	Report	(yellow card) 34' Lauren Fields	Stadium: Corcoran Field; Attendance: 1,430; Referee: Nicole Green; Assistant referees: Audra Fullen; Grace Barrett; Fourth official: Brian Apwisch

November 15	(4) UCLA	3–1	Pepperdine	Los Angeles, CA
9:00 p.m. EST	Emma Egizii 3'; Bella Winn 31'; Payten Cooper 90'; Leena Powell (yellow card) 90'	Report	(yellow card) 15' Tatum Wynalda; (yellow card) 36' Kendall Campbell; 89' Tabitha LaParl	Stadium: Wallis Annenberg Stadium; Attendance: 613; Referee: Michael Zapata; Assistant referees: Abdu Razzaq Juma; Jennifer Fite; Fourth official: Adrian Gonzalez

===== Second round =====
November 20	(3) Colorado	4–1	(6) Xavier	East Lansing, MI
3:00 pm EST	Faith Leyba 18'; Reagan Kotschau 32' (yellow card) 83'; Hope Leyba 87'; Riley MacDonald 89'	Report	(yellow card) 83' Natalie Bain; 89' Presley Pennekamp	Stadium: DeMartin Soccer Complex; Attendance: 100; Referee: Nick Balcer; Assistant referees: Jake Brochu; Justin Tatsak; Fourth official: Mykela Hawkins

November 20	(2) Michigan State	1–0	(7) Wake Forest	East Lansing, MI
6:00 pm EST	Sofia Beerworth (yellow card) 33'; Kayla Briggs 69'	Report	(yellow card) 33' Sierra Sythe; (yellow card) 80' Alex Wood; (yellow card) 84' Laine DeNatale	Stadium: DeMartin Soccer Complex; Attendance: 1,247; Referee: Nicole Green; Assistant referees: Audra Fullen; Grace Barrett; Fourth official: Stephen Castro

November 21	(4) UCLA	1–1 (a.e.t.) (2–4 p)	(5) BYU	Stanford, CA
7:00 pm EST	Bridgette Marin-Valencia (yellow card) 71'; Emma Egizii 81'	Report	(yellow card) 70' Ella Labrum; 72' Mattyn Summers-Oviatt	Stadium: Cagan Stadium; Attendance: 2,076; Referee: Victor Mba; Assistant referees: Jessica Peralta; Isai Baltezar; Fourth official: Cecilia Chavez
	Penalties
	America Frias (penalty missed); Emma Egizii (penalty missed); Val Vargas (penalty scored); Paloma Daubert (penalty scored)		(penalty scored) MacKenzee Vance; (penalty scored) Ellie Walbruch; (penalty scored) Izzi Stratton; (penalty scored) Halle Dixon

November 21	(1) Stanford	7–3	(8) Alabama	Stanford, CA
10:00pm EST	Jasmine Aikey 4', 74'; Andrea Kitahata 18'; Elise Evans 41', 48'; Y-Lan Nguyen 88'; Allie Montoya 90'	Report	12', 54' Gianna Paul; (yellow card) 15' Ulla Sharp; 34' Maddie Padelski	Stadium: Cagan Stadium; Attendance: 2,076; Referee: Oscar Guillen; Assistant referees: Cecilia Chavez; Roxana Guillen; Fourth official: Isai Baltezar

===== Round of 16 =====
November 23	(2) Michigan State	2–1	(3) Colorado	East Lansing, MI
1:00 pm EST	Bella Najera 1', 56' (pen.); Adelle Francis (yellow card) 76'	Report	(yellow card) 18' Greer Maguire; 33' Faith Leyba; (yellow card) 89' CU Team	Stadium: DeMartin Soccer Complex; Attendance: 1,898; Referee: Nikola Aleksic; Assistant referees: Fernado Pina; Colton Odem; Fourth official: Jason Cross

November 24	(1) Stanford	6–0	(5) BYU	Stanford, CA
4:00 pm EST	Jasmine Aikey 8', 19'; Andrea Kitahata 11'; Eleanor Klinger 35', 58'; Lily Freer (yellow card) 39'; Charlotte Kohler 55'	Report		Stadium: Maloney Field at Laird Q. Cagan Stadium; Attendance: 1,744; Referee: Michael Gebreslassie; Assistant referees: Peter Hanson; Adriana Contreras; Fourth official: Levi Rippy

===== Quarterfinals =====
November 28	(1) Stanford	5–1	(2) Michigan State	Stanford, CA
5:00 PM EST	Eleanor Klinger 15'; Charlotte Kohler 25'; Andrea Kitahata 60', 63'; Jasmine Aikey 68'	Report	(yellow card) 47' Maggie Illig; 76' Bella Najera	Stadium: Maloney Field at Laird Q. Cagan Stadium; Attendance: 2,088; Referee: Amber OConnor; Assistant referees: Andrew Hanks; Ritesh Chotu; Fourth official: Isai Baltezar

Rankings shown are seeds in this bracket of the tournament.

=== Virginia bracket ===
First round Campus Sites
2	Duke*	3
Elon	0
Maine	0
7	UCF*	2
6	Louisville (pen.)*	1 (5)
Kentucky	1 (4)
Cal Baptist	1
3	Kansas*	3
4	Washington*	2
Montana	0
Dartmouth	0
5	Arkansas*	1
8	Penn State*	3
Army	0
High Point	0
1	Virginia*	5

Second round Regional Campus Sites
2	Duke*	1
7	UCF	0
6	Louisville	1
3	Kansas	3
4	Washington (a.e.t.)*	1
5	Arkansas	0
8	Penn State	0
1	Virginia*	2

Round of 16; Regional Campus Sites
2	Duke*	2
3	Kansas	0
4	Washington (pen.)	1 (5)
1	Virginia*	1 (4)

Quarterfinal; Campus Sites
2	Duke*	3
4	Washington	0

* Host institution

==== Schedule ====
===== First round =====
November 14	(2) Duke	3–0	Elon	Durham, NC
6:00 p.m. EST	Mia Minestrella 11', 23', 48'	Report		Stadium: Koskinen Stadium; Attendance: 706; Referee: Kevin Maurer; Assistant referees: Robert Dail; Richard Wells; Fourth official: Dustin Thorne

November 14	(5) Arkansas	1–0	Dartmouth	Fayetteville, AR
7:00 p.m. EST	Natalie Wagner (yellow card) 29'; Team (yellow card) 49'; Team (yellow card) 49'; Vailana Tu'ua 61'	Report		Stadium: Razorback Field; Attendance: 1,158; Referee: Rodrigo Albequerque; Assistant referees: Will Franklin; Eric Aplis; Fourth official: Chris Thresher

November 14	(3) Kansas	3–1	Cal Baptist	Lawrence, KS
7:00 p.m. EST	Saige Wimes 4'; Jillian Gregorski 25'; Faith Johnston 37'	Report	29' Anja Jestrovic	Stadium: Rock Chalk Park; Attendance: 2,613; Referee: Drew Klemp; Assistant referees: Luis Tribaldo; Brendan Sweetman; Fourth official: Zachary Richter

November 14	(7) UCF	2–0	Maine	Orlando, FL
7:00 p.m. EST	Rajanah Reed 21'; Hannah Boughton 65'	Report		Stadium: UCF Soccer and Track Stadium; Attendance: 1,132; Referee: Elvis Osmonovic; Assistant referees: Carlos Morales-Lastra; Kamil Sikor; Fourth official: Jake Joyce

November 14	(1) Virginia	5–0	High Point	Charlottesville, VA
7:00 p.m. EST	Ella Carter 13'; Allie Ross 36'; Addison Halpern 61'; Maggie Cagle 66'; Kiki Maki (yellow card) 76'; Sophia Bradley 87'	Report		Stadium: Klöckner Stadium; Attendance: 1,212; Referee: Danielle Chesky; Assistant referees: Sean Conlee; Katelyn Bourque; Fourth official: Kevin Uitto

November 14	(4) Washington	2–0	Montana	Seattle, WA
10:00 p.m. EST	Alex Buck 11', 90'; Anna Menti (yellow card) 22'	Report	(yellow card) 44' Lucie Rokos	Stadium: Husky Soccer Stadium; Attendance: 2,564; Referee: Cedric Adams; Assistant referees: Cody Zipp; Pavel Spichak; Fourth official: Jesus Mejia

November 15	(6) Louisville	1–1 (a.e.t.) (5–4 p)	Kentucky	Louisville, KY
2:00 p.m. EST	Brooklyn Lee (yellow card) 45'; Amelia Swinarski (yellow card) 75' (goal) 79'; Lizzie Sexton (yellow card) 81'	Report	(yellow card) 45' Sydni Fink; 47' Thalia Morisi; (yellow card) 81' UKY Team; (yellow card) 98' Tanner Strickland	Stadium: Lynn Stadium; Attendance: 1,016; Referee: Austin Saini; Assistant referees: Eric Burton; Erin Patterson; Fourth official: Aaron Rawlins
	Penalties
	Karsyn Cherry (penalty scored); Amelia Swinarski (penalty scored); AG Gibson (penalty missed); Erynn Floyd (penalty missed); Fina Davy (penalty scored); Grace Maddox (penalty scored); Mackenzie Geigle (penalty scored)		(penalty missed) Anne Sikorski; (penalty scored) Grace Sikorski; (penalty scored) Thalia Morisi; (penalty missed) Sydni Fink; (penalty scored) Maddie Eastman; (penalty missed) Catherine Rapp; (penalty scored) Marilia Nieves-Melchor; (penalty missed) Kendall Campbell

November 15	(8) Penn State	3–0	Army	State College, PA
5:00 p.m. EST	Kaitlyn MacBean 9'; Amelia White 19'; Dikte Bang 76'	Report		Stadium: Jeffrey Field; Attendance: 676; Referee: Ashley Cedro; Assistant referees: Amelia Graytock; Taylor Heemstra; Fourth official: Sarah Siegel

===== Second round =====
November 20	(4) Washington	1–0 (a.e.t.)	(5) Arkansas	Charlottesville, VA
3:00 p.m. EST	Alex Buck (yellow card) 96' 99'	Report	(yellow card) 76' Aniyah Nurse-Whyte; (yellow card) 82' Dejionee Anderson; (yellow card) 95' Makenzie Malham	Stadium: Klöckner Stadium; Attendance: N/A; Referee: Dustin Thorne; Assistant referees: Bill Dittmar; Sean Conlee; Fourth official: Richard Crowgey

November 20	(3) Kansas	3–1	(6) Louisville	Durham, NC
4:00 p.m. EST	Faith Johnston 42'; Jillian Gregorski 82'; Lexi Watts 86'	Report	19' Grace Maddox	Stadium: Koskinen Stadium; Attendance: 882; Referee: Kevin Maurer; Assistant referees: Aaron Hormuth; Marcus Moss; Fourth official: Lauren Aldrich

November 20	(1) Virginia	2–0	(8) Penn State	Charlottesville, VA
6:00 p.m. EST	Maggie Cagle 33' (yellow card) 82'; Lia Godfrey 68'; Kiki Maki (yellow card) 80'	Report	(yellow card) 22' Riley Gleason; (yellow card) 53' Hannah Jordan; (yellow card) 77' Molly Martin	Stadium: Klöckner Stadium; Attendance: 1,107; Referee: JC Griggs; Assistant referees: Nicholas Seymour; Kevin Uitto; Fourth official: Esli Leon

November 20	(2) Duke	1–0	(7) UCF	Durham, NC
6:30 p.m. EST	Mia Minestrella 35'	Report		Stadium: Koskinen Stadium; Attendance: 882; Referee: John Rush; Assistant referees: Jeremy L.B. Smith; Adonis Alawar; Fourth official: Thomas Rutherford

===== Round of 16 =====
November 23	(1) Virginia	1–1 (a.e.t.) (4–5 p)	(4) Washington	Charlottesville, VA
2:00 p.m. EST	Addison Halpern 53'; Victoria Safradin (yellow card) 110'	Report	13' (red card) 80' Kalea Eichenberger; (yellow card) 110' Tanner Ijams	Stadium: Klöckner Stadium; Attendance: 1,610; Referee: Meghan Mullen; Assistant referees: Amelia Graytock; Josh Pitt; Fourth official: Robert Velds
	Penalties
	Maggie Cagle (penalty missed); Lia Godfrey (penalty scored); Jordyn Hardeman (penalty scored); Pearl Cecil (penalty scored); Addison Halpern (penalty scored)		(penalty scored) Anna Menti; (penalty scored) Julia Hüsch; (penalty scored) Alex Buck; (penalty scored) Samiah Shell; (penalty scored) Lucy Newlin

November 23	(2) Duke	2–0	(3) Kansas	Durham, NC
2:00 p.m. EST	Elle Piper (yellow card) 15'; Mia Minestrella 37'; Kat Rader 47'	Report	(yellow card) 49' KU Team	Stadium: Koskinen Stadium; Attendance: 826; Referee: Nicole Green; Assistant referees: Marcus Moss; Katelyn Bourque; Fourth official: Esli (Otto) Leon

===== Quarterfinals =====
November 28	(2) Duke	3–0	(4) Washington	Durham, NC
4:00 PM EST	Kat Rader 35'; Devin Lynch 57'; Jocelyn Travers (yellow card) 60'; Cameron Roller (yellow card) 60'; Mia Minestrella 81'	Report		Stadium: Koskinen Stadium; Attendance: 1,200; Referee: JC Griggs; Assistant referees: Justin Howard; Sharon Gingrich; Fourth official: John Matto

Rankings shown are seeds in this bracket of the tournament.

=== College Cup ===
Semifinals; December 5 CPKC Stadium; Kansas City, Missouri
2	TCU	0
3	Florida State	1
1	Stanford	1
2	Duke	0

Final; December 8 CPKC Stadium; Kansas City, Missouri
3	Florida State	1
1	Stanford	0

==== Schedule ====
===== Semi-finals =====
December 5	#5 TCU	0–1	#6 Florida State	Kansas City, MO
5:00 PM EST		Report	73' Wrianna Hudson; (yellow card) 34' Nawreen Ahmad	Stadium: CPKC Stadium; Attendance: 7,066; Referee: Amin Hadzic; Assistant referees: Jennifer Dumaine; Jessica Paola Peralta Meza; Fourth official: Matt Geringer

December 5	#1 Stanford	1–0	#11 Duke	Kansas City, MO
7:45 PM EST	Jasmine Aikey 10'; Y-Lan Nguyen (yellow card) 74'	Report	(yellow card) 49' Duke Team	Stadium: CPKC Stadium; Attendance: 7,066; Referee: Marie Durr; Assistant referees: Tiffini Turpin; Chana Forstall; Fourth official: Emily Brownback

===== Final =====
December 8	#1 Stanford	0–1	#6 Florida State	Kansas City, MO
7:00 PM EST	Sophie Murdock (yellow card) 34'	Report	(yellow card) 85' Jordynn Dudley; (yellow card) 85' FSU Team; 87' Wrianna Hudson	Stadium: CPKC Stadium; Attendance: 3,311; Referee: Richonne Clark; Assistant referees: Melissa Beck; Audra Fullen; Fourth official: Velimir Stefanovic

Rankings from United Soccer Coaches Final Regular Season Rankings

== Record by conference ==
Conference	Bids	Record	Pct.	R32	R16	E8	F4	CG	NC
ACC	9	21–4–6	.774	9	5	3	3	2	1
Big 12	8	12–5–6	.652	8	5	1	1	–	–
Big Ten	9	9–7–6	.545	7	3	3	–	–	–
SEC	9	5–7–4	.438	4	2	1	–	–	–
Big East	2	2–2–1	.500	2	1	–	–	–	–
ASUN	1	1–1–0	.500	1	–	–	–	–	–
American	2	1–2–0	.333	1	–	–	–	–	–
WAC	2	0–2–0	.000	–	–	–	–	–	–
Other	22	0–21–1	.023	–	–	–	–	–	–

- The R32, S16, E8, F4, CG, and NC columns indicate how many teams from each conference were in the Round of 32 (second round), Round of 16 (third round), Quarterfinals (Elite Eight), Semi-finals (Final Four), Championship Game, and National Champion, respectively.
- The following conferences received one bid and failed to place a team into the round of 32: American East, Atlantic 10, Big Sky, Big South, Big West, CAA, C-USA, Horizon, Ivy, MAAC, MAC, Missouri Valley, Mountain West, Northeast, Ohio Valley, Patriot, SoCon, Southland, Summit League, Sun Belt, SWAC, West Coast. These conference's records have been consolidated in the "Other" row.

== Statistics ==
=== Goalscorers ===
There were 192 goals scored in 63 matches, for an average of 3.05 goals per match.

6 goals

- (United States) Mia Minestrella – Duke
- (United States) Jasmine Aikey – Stanford

5 goals

- (United States) Seven Castain – TCU

4 goals

- (United States) Wrianna Hudson – Florida State
- (United States) Andrea Kitahata – Stanford

3 goals

- (United States) Eleanor Klinger – Stanford
- (United States) Charlotte Kohler – Stanford
- (United States) Bella Najera – Michigan State
- (United States) Amanda Schlueter – Ohio State
- (United States) Emma Yolinsky – TCU
- (United States) Alex Buck – Washington

2 goals

- (United States) Maddie Padelski – Alabama
- (United States) Gianna Paul – Alabama
- (United States) Kai Hayes – Baylor
- (United States) Reagan Kotschau – Colorado
- (United States) Faith Leyba – Colorado
- (United States) Kat Rader – Duke
- (United States) Jordynn Dudley – Florida State
- (United States) Yuna McCormack – Florida State
- (United States) Natalie Means – Georgetown
- (United States) Jillian Gregorski – Kansas
- (United States) Faith Johnston – Kansas
- (Canada) Sariyah Bailey – LSU
- (Iceland) Ída Marín Hermannsdóttir – LSU
- (Japan) Ai Kitagawa – Memphis
- (Canada) Kayla Briggs – Michigan State
- (United States) Kate Faasse – North Carolina
- (United States) Charlie Codd – Notre Dame
- (United States) Elise Evans – Stanford
- (Mexico) Sydney Becerra – TCU
- (United States) Emma Egizii – UCLA
- (United States) Mary Beth McLaughlin – Vanderbilt
- (United States) Sydney Watts – Vanderbilt
- (United States) Maggie Cagle – Virginia
- (United States) Addison Halpern – Virginia
- (United States) Abbey Olexa – West Virginia
- (United States) Alicia Riggins – West Virginia
- (United States) Erin Connolly – Wisconsin

1 goal

- (United States) Larkin Thomason – Alabama
- (United States) Vailana Tu'ua – Arkansas
- (United States) Hallie Augustyn – Baylor
- (United States) Olivia Hess – Baylor
- (United States) Tyler Isgrig – Baylor
- (United States) Mia Goettsche – BYU
- (United States) Mattyn Summers-Oviatt – BYU
- (Serbia) Anja Jestrović – Cal Baptist
- (United States) Jessie Halladay – Cal Poly
- (United States) Elle Bissinger – Clemson
- (United States) Anna Castenfelt – Clemson
- (United States) Taylor Leib – Clemson
- (United States) Renee Lyles – Clemson
- (United States) Hope Leyba – Colorado
- (United States) Riley MacDonald – Colorado
- (United States) Vivi Zacarias – Colorado
- (United States) Devin Lynch – Duke
- (Brazil) Lara Dantas – Florida State
- (United States) Heather Gilchrist – Florida State
- (United States) Jaida McGrew – Florida State
- (United States) Taylor Suarez – Florida State
- (United States) Nyanya Touray – Florida State
- (Jamaica) Mimi Van Zanten – Florida State
- (United States) Mary Cochran – Georgetown
- (United States) Lizzie Heller – Georgetown
- (United States) Shay Montgomery – Georgetown
- (United States) Ella Remy – Houston Christian
- (United States) Sydney Stephens – Illinois
- (United States) Kenzie Roling – Iowa
- (United States) Elle Wildman – Iowa
- (United States) Saige Wimes – Kansas
- (United States) Lexi Watts – Kansas
- (United States) Thalia Morisi – Kentucky
- (Puerto Rico) Ivy Garner – Liberty
- (United States) Bella Carapazza – Lipscomb
- (United States) Grace Maddox – Louisville
- (United States) Amelia Swinarski – Louisville
- (United States) Gabbi Ceballos – LSU
- (United States) Ava Galligan – LSU
- (United States) Kennedy Bell – Michigan State
- (United States) Adelle Francis – Michigan State
- (United States) Emerson Sargeant – Michigan State
- (United States) Lola Wojcik – Milwaukee
- (United States) Bella Devey – North Carolina
- (United States) Caitlin Mara – North Carolina
- (United States) Linda Ullmark – North Carolina
- (United States) Megan Norkett – Northwestern
- (United States) Kennedy Roesch – Northwestern
- (United States) Ellie Hodsden – Notre Dame
- (United States) Tessa Knapp – Notre Dame
- (United States) Jadin Bonham – Ohio State
- (United States) Riley Lijewski – Ohio State
- (United States) Anika Poremba – Ohio State
- (United States) Kaitlyn MacBean – Penn State
- (United States) Amelia White – Penn State
- (Denmark) Dikte Bang – Penn State
- (United States) Tabitha LaParl – Pepperdine
- (United States) Cuyler Zulauf – South Carolina
- (United States) Shae Harvey – Stanford
- (United States) Joelle Jung – Stanford
- (United States) Allie Montoya – Stanford
- (United States) Y-Lan Nguyen – Stanford
- (United States) Kate Runyon – Tennessee
- (United States) Kamdyn Fuller – TCU
- (Philippines) Katana Norman – TCU
- (United States) Cameron Patton – TCU
- (United States) Grace Vest – TCU
- (United States) Macy Blackburn – Texas Tech
- (United States) Peyton Parsons – Texas Tech
- (United States) Taylor Zdrojewski – Texas Tech
- (United States) Rajanah Reed – UCF
- (United States) Hannah Boughton – UCF
- (United States) Bella Winn – UCLA
- (United States) Payten Cooper – UCLA
- (United States) Jasmine Kessler – UTSA
- (United States) Mia Mullenmeister – Utah State
- (United States) Bailey Peterson – Utah Valley
- (United States) Adysen Armenta – Vanderbilt
- (United States) Melania Fullerton – Vanderbilt
- (United States) Courtney Jones – Vanderbilt
- (United States) Sophia Bradley – Virginia
- (United States) Ella Carter – Virginia
- (United States) Lia Godfrey – Virginia
- (United States) Allie Ross – Virginia
- (United States) Kylie Maxwell – Wake Forest
- (United States) Sammi Wiemann – Wake Forest
- (United States) Kalea Eichenberger – Washington
- (Canada) Anna Hauer – West Virginia
- (United States) Ajanae Respass – West Virginia
- (United States) Abby Smothers – Western Michigan
- (United States) Meredith Vance – Western Michigan
- (United States) Adee Boer – Wisconsin
- (United States) Regan Dancer – Xavier
- (Sweden) Elin Hansson – Xavier
- (United States) Presley Pennekamp – Xavier
= Golden Goal

== All-tournament team ==
- Jasmine Aikey, Stanford
- Morgan Brown, TCU
- Heather Gilchrist, Florida State
- Shae Harvey, Stanford
- Wrianna Hudson, Florida State (Most Outstanding Offensive Player)
- Peyton McGovern, Florida State
- Y-Lan Nguyen, Stanford
- Kate Ockene, Florida State (Most Outstanding Defensive Player)
- Avery Oder, Duke
- Kat Rader, Duke
- Taylor Suarez, Florida State

== See also ==
- 2025 NCAA Division I men's soccer tournament
