= Virginia Cavaliers women's soccer =

American college soccer team

Virginia Cavaliers
- 2025 Virginia Cavaliers women's soccer team
- Founded: 1985; 41 years ago
- University: University of Virginia
- Head coach: Steve Swanson (26th season)
- Conference: ACC
- Location: Charlottesville, Virginia, US
- Stadium: Klöckner Stadium (capacity: 8,000)
- Nickname: Cavaliers
- Colors: Orange and blue
Home	Away

NCAA tournament runner-up
- 2014

NCAA tournament College Cup
- 1991, 2013, 2014, 2020

NCAA tournament Quarterfinals
- 1991, 2001, 2005, 2011, 2013–2015, 2020, 2022

NCAA tournament Round of 16
- 1988–1991, 1997, 1999–2002, 2005–2018, 2020–2022, 2025

NCAA tournament appearances
- 1987–1992, 1994–2022, 2024, 2025

Conference regular season championships
- 2013, 2015, 2021

The Virginia Cavaliers women's soccer team represents University of Virginia in the Atlantic Coast Conference (ACC) of NCAA Division I women's college soccer. The team has won three regular season conference championships, in 2013, 2015 and 2021. The Cavaliers have also won the ACC Women's Soccer Tournament twice, in 2004 and 2012. The team has advanced to the NCAA Women's soccer tournament thirty three times. Their best appearance is runner up in 2014.

== History ==
=== 1980s ===
The Virginia Cavaliers women's soccer team was founded in 1985 with head coach Dan Beshoar. The team went 10–8–0 in their inaugural season and did not play in a conference. The University of Virginia was a member of the Atlantic Coast Conference, but the conference did not begin to sponsor women's soccer until 1987. Beshoar would only coach one season and Lauren Gregg would take over in 1986. In her first season, the Cavaliers finished with their only non-winning record in program history. An 8–8–2 record was still .500, however. In 1987 the team made its first NCAA Women's soccer tournament, falling in the first round. 1988 was the inaugural season of the ACC Women's Soccer Tournament. The Cavaliers qualified, and fell in the first round. However, they made it all the way to the Sweet 16 in the NCAA Tournament. The decade closed with repeat performances in both the ACC and NCAA tournaments, but and improvement to 16 overall wins, from 14 in the previous season.

=== 1990s ===
Gregg's successful run continued into the 90s, as the Cavaliers began the decade with an 18 win season, finished runners up in the ACC Tournament, and made the Sweet 16 of the NCAA Tournament. Their 18–3–0 record was a program best for wins that would stand until 2013. The Cavaliers had continued success in 1991 as they made the semifinals of the NCAA Tournament. 1993 proved to be a difficult season, in relative terms, for the team. Their 10–9–2 record was the second worst by winning percentage in team history. It was also only the third time in the team's history they did not qualify for the NCAA Tournament. The Cavaliers would turn it around quickly however, finishing 1994 with 4 conference wins, 13 overall wins, and a return to the NCAA Tournament. 1994 was the start of a string of 29 straight NCAA appearances for the team. After a very similar 1995 season, Gregg would retire as head coach. Prior to the 1996 season, it was announced that April Heinrichs would be the third coach in program history. Heinrichs continued the team's success, winning double digit overall games in each year between 1996 and 1999. The Cavailers also qualified for both the NCAA Tournament and ACC Tournament in those seasons. A new team record of 5 ACC wins was set in 1998. The team also made the NCAA Sweet 16 in 1997 and 1999. After the 1999 season, Heinrichs left Virginia to become the coach of the US Women's National Team.

=== 2000s ===
The decade began with the hiring of Steve Swanson as the program's fourth head coach in history. The hiring would prove a transformative one, but Swanson got off to a slow start. In 2000, the team won only 11 overall games, their lowest total since 1993. However, the team did make it to the NCAA Sweet 16 for the second year in a row. 2001 proved successful with 17 total wins and a trip to the NCAA Quarterfinals. 2002 saw a lower win total of 13, but the team returned to the NCAA Round of 16. 2003 would end a run of four straight years making the NCAA Round of 16. The Cavaliers lost in the second round of the NCAA Tournament and won 12 games overall. In 2004, the team won their first ever ACC Tournament Championship. This post-season luck did not carry forward to the NCAA Tournament, where they lost in the second round. The team tied a then-program best win total of 18 in 2005, finished runners up in the ACC Tournament and returned to the Quarterfinals of the NCAA Tournament. The 2005 season began a run of 14 straight season where the Cavaliers made at least the NCAA Round of 16. However, ACC Tournament success would not follow, as the team never made it past the second round from 2006 to 2011. The team closed the decade with a 10 win season in 2009.

=== 2010s ===
The Cavaliers won an increasing number of games each year between 2010 and 2013. This improvement streak began with a solid 15 wins, and 7 conference wins in 2000. Additionally, the Cavaliers extended their streak of making at least the NCAA Round of 16. 2011 would be the team's fourth ever NCAA Quarterfinals appearance. 2012 saw the Cavaliers win their second ACC Tournament, tie their program record for overall wins at 18, and make the NCAA Sweet 16. 2013 and 2014 would be the two best years in program history. In 2013, the Cavaliers had a perfect ACC season, finishing 13–0–0 and winning the regular season title. They would also make the NCAA Semifinals for the first time in since 1991. In 2014, they finished runners up in both the ACC and NCAA Tournaments. To follow that up, they again finished runners up in the ACC Tournament in 2015. However, they fell one win short of a third straight year of 20 overall wins. The program could not quite repeat those highs from 2016 to 2018. However, the team did finish with double digit wins and NCAA Sweet 16 appearances in each of those seasons.

=== 2020s ===
The decade started with a season shortened by the COVID-19 pandemic. The team played a reduced conference schedule in the fall and played their out of conference schedule in the spring of 2021. They finished in third place in the ACC with a 5–2–1 record. The NCAA tournament was held in the spring, and the Cavaliers advanced to the Semifinals, before falling on penalties. This was their best performance in the NCAA tournament since 2014. 2021 saw a return to a more normal schedule and the Cavaliers posted a 18–3–2 overall record and a 8–0–2 ACC record. They won the ACC Regular Season title and received an at-large bid to the NCAA Tournament. They were unable to match last year's semifinal performance, falling in the Round of 16. 2022 was another successful year with the Cavaliers posting 16 wins and finishing fourth in the ACC. They qualified for the NCAA Tournament for the twenty-ninth time in a row and reached the Quarterfinals before losing to the eventual champion, UCLA. 2023 was a poor season for the Cavaliers as they finished 8–3–6 overall and 3–3–4 in the ACC to finish in seventh place. This was the first time in ACC Tournament history that the Cavaliers did not qualify. They also were not selected for the NCAA tournament, breaking the streak of twenty-nine straight appearances. Their eight wins tied for lowest in program history with 1986, their second year as a team. 2024 proved to be a bit of a return to normalcy as the Cavaliers finished 13–5–1 overall and 5–5–0 in ACC play. They did not qualify for the ACC tournament, but did qualify for the NCAA tournament where they made the Second Round. Virginia continued its recovery in 2025 as they finished 14–3–5 overall and 6–2–2 in ACC play. They were the top ranked team for four weeks during the season and returned to the ACC tournament, where they reached the Semifinals. They were a top seed in the NCAA tournament, but fell in the Round of 16 in a penalty shoot-out.

== Personnel ==
=== Current roster ===
As of November 2026

Note: Flags indicate national team as defined under FIFA eligibility rules; some limited exceptions apply. Players may hold more than one non-FIFA nationality.

No.	Pos.	Nation	Player
1	GK	USA	Victoria Safradin
2	MF	USA	Kira Waller
3	FW	USA	Sophia Bradley
4	DF	USA	Jordyn Hardeman
5	FW	USA	Helen Olszewski
6	FW	USA	Addison Halpern
7	FW	USA	Marin McCormack
8	FW	USA	Allie Ross
9	FW	BRA	Gio Canali
11	FW	USA	Reese Mattern
12	FW	USA	Aniyah Collier
13	FW	USA	Loretta Talbott
14	DF	USA	Faith Broering
15	FW	USA	Sarah Flammia

No.	Pos.	Nation	Player
16	MF	USA	Ella Carter
17	DF	USA	Tatum Galvin
18	DF	NED	Liv Rademaker
19	MF	USA	Jill Flammia
20	FW	USA	Carrie Helfrich
21	MF	USA	Kyndal Shuler
23	DF	USA	Hollis Mefford
24	DF	USA	Kathryn Kelly
25	DF	NED	Kyra Koopman
26	DF	USA	Mackenzie Mize
27	MF	USA	Pearl Cecil
29	GK	USA	Molly Carlson
30	GK	USA	Wicki Dunlap
33	GK	USA	Natalie Cohen

=== Team management ===
Position	Staff
Athletic Director	Carla Williams
Head coach	Steve Swanson
Associate head coach	Ron Raab
Assistant Coach	Sam Raper
Assistant Coach	Lizzy Sieracki
Director of Operations	Eilidh Thomson

== Seasons ==
Season	Head coach	Season result						Tournament results	
Season	Head coach	Overall			Conference			Conference	NCAA
Season	Head coach	Wins	Losses	Ties	Wins	Losses	Ties	Conference	NCAA
1985	Dan Beshoar	10	8	0	No Conference				—
1986	Lauren Gregg	8	8	2	No Conference				—
1987	Lauren Gregg	14	7	1	0	2	1	No Tournament	NCAA First Round
1988	Lauren Gregg	12	6	3	1	2	0	First round	NCAA Sweet 16
1989	Lauren Gregg	16	5	0	2	2	0	First round	NCAA Sweet 16
1990	Lauren Gregg	18	3	0	3	1	0	Runner up	NCAA Sweet 16
1991	Lauren Gregg	14	5	3	2	1	1	First round	NCAA Semifinal
1992	Lauren Gregg	14	5	1	1	2	1	Second Round	NCAA Second Round
1993	Lauren Gregg	10	9	2	1	2	1	Second Round	—
1994	Lauren Gregg	13	5	3	4	1	1	First round	NCAA First Round
1995	Lauren Gregg	14	5	2	4	3	0	First round	NCAA Second Round
1996	April Heinrichs	12	7	2	3	3	1	Second Round	NCAA First Round
1997	April Heinrichs	14	5	2	4	3	0	First round	NCAA Sweet 16
1998	April Heinrichs	13	6	2	5	2	0	Second Round	NCAA Second Round
1999	April Heinrichs	13	9	0	4	3	0	First round	NCAA Sweet 16
2000	Steve Swanson	11	8	1	4	3	0	First round	NCAA Sweet 16
2001	Steve Swanson	17	4	2	5	2	0	Second Round	NCAA Quarterfinals
2002	Steve Swanson	13	7	2	4	3	0	First round	NCAA Sweet 16
2003	Steve Swanson	12	5	4	3	3	1	First round	NCAA Second Round
2004	Steve Swanson	17	3	2	6	2	1	Champions	NCAA Second Round
2005	Steve Swanson	18	6	1	8	2	0	Runner up	NCAA Quarterfinals
2006	Steve Swanson	12	8	2	5	4	1	First round	NCAA Sweet 16
2007	Steve Swanson	13	4	6	5	2	3	Second Round	NCAA Sweet 16
2008	Steve Swanson	15	5	3	6	3	1	Second Round	NCAA Sweet 16
2009	Steve Swanson	10	6	6	4	4	2	First round	NCAA Sweet 16
2010	Steve Swanson	15	5	2	7	2	1	First round	NCAA Sweet 16
2011	Steve Swanson	17	5	2	7	2	1	Second Round	NCAA Quarterfinals
2012	Steve Swanson	18	5	1	6	3	1	Champions	NCAA Sweet 16
2013	Steve Swanson	24	1	1	13	0	0	Second Round	NCAA Semifinals
2014	Steve Swanson	23	3	0	9	1	0	Runner up	NCAA Runner Up
2015	Steve Swanson	19	1	3	9	1	0	Runner up	NCAA Quarterfinals
2016	Steve Swanson	15	5	2	6	2	2	First round	NCAA Sweet 16
2017	Steve Swanson	13	6	4	5	2	3	Second round	NCAA Sweet 16
2018	Steve Swanson	16	5	1	7	3	0	Second round	NCAA Sweet 16
2019	Steve Swanson	17	2	3	6	0	3	Runner up	NCAA Second Round
2020	Steve Swanson	14	4	3	5	2	1	Second round	NCAA Semifinals
2021	Steve Swanson	18	3	2	8	0	1	Runner up	NCAA Sweet 16
2022	Steve Swanson	16	4	3	6	2	2	First round	NCAA Quarterfinals
2023	Steve Swanson	8	3	6	3	3	4	—	—
2024	Steve Swanson	13	5	1	5	5	0	—	NCAA Second Round
2025	Steve Swanson	14	3	5	6	2	2	Semifinals	NCAA Sweet 16

== Notable alumni ==
=== Current Professionals ===
As of February 4, 2026

- Gloria Douglas (2010–2013) – Currently with CD Pradejón and Puerto Rico international
- (United States) Morgan Gautrat (2011–2014) – Currently with Orlando Pride
- (United States) Brittany Ratcliffe (2012–2015) – Currently with Seattle Reign FC
- (United States) Makenzy Robbe (2012–2015) – Currently with Houston Dash
- (United States) Emily Sonnett (2012–2015) – Currently with Gotham FC and USA international
- (United States) Kristen McNabb (2012–2016) – Currently with San Diego Wave FC
- Megan Reid (2014–2017) – Currently with Denver Summit FC and Canada international
- (United States) Brianna Westrup (2015–2018) – Currently with Sunderland
- (United States) Courtney Petersen (2015–2019) – Currently with Racing Louisville FC
- (United States) Samantha Rosette (2016–2018) – Currently with Brooklyn FC
- (United States) Taylor Ziemer (2016–2018) – Currently with FC Köln
- (United States) Phoebe McClernon (2016–2019) – Currently with Seattle Reign FC
- (United States) Laurel Ivory (2017–2021) – Currently with Boston Legacy FC
- (United States) Taryn Torres (2017–2021) – Currently with Gotham FC
- Claire Constant (2018–2022) – Currently with DC Power FC and Haiti international
- Diana Ordoñez (2019–2021) – Currently with Tigres UANL and Mexico international
- (United States) Talia Staude (2019–2023) – Currently with North Carolina Courage
- (United States) Sarah McCoy (2020–2022) – Currently with Spokane Zephyr FC
- (United States) Lia Godfrey (2020–2025) – Currently with San Diego Wave FC
- (United States) Laney Rouse (2020–2025) – Currently with Kansas City Current
- (United States) Haley Hopkins (2021–2022) – Currently with Kansas City Current
- (United States) Maggie Cagle (2022–2025) – Currently with Vittsjö GIK
- (United States) Yuna McCormack (2023–2024) – Currently with Denver Summit FC
- (United States) Moira Kelley (2024) – Currently with AS Saint-Étienne
