= 2023 Big West Conference women's soccer tournament =

- Classification: Division I
- Teams: 6
- Matches: 5
- Attendance: 3,001
- Site: Titan Stadium (Semifinals & Final); Fullerton, California
- Champions: UC Irvine (4th title)
- Winning coach: Scott Juniper (3rd title)
- MVP: Emilie Castagna (UC Irvine)
- Broadcast: ESPN+

2023 Big West Conference women's soccer standings
	Conf.						Overall
Team	W		L		T	PCT	W		L		T	PCT
Cal State Fullerton ‍†‍‍	6	–	1	–	3	.750	8	–	5	–	7	.575
UC Davis ‍‍‍	6	–	2	–	2	.700	10	–	7	–	2	.579
Cal Poly ‍‍‍	6	–	3	–	1	.650	10	–	8	–	3	.548
Long Beach State ‍‍‍	5	–	3	–	2	.600	10	–	6	–	4	.600
UC San Diego ‍‍‍	4	–	3	–	3	.550	5	–	8	–	5	.417
No. 20 UC Irvine ‍‍‡‍^{y}	3	–	3	–	4	.500	10	–	8	–	6	.542
Hawaii ‍‍‍	4	–	5	–	1	.450	5	–	8	–	3	.406
Cal State Bakersfield ‍‍‍	2	–	5	–	3	.350	3	–	10	–	4	.294
UC Riverside ‍‍‍	2	–	5	–	3	.350	2	–	10	–	7	.289
UC Santa Barbara ‍‍‍	2	–	6	–	2	.300	4	–	8	–	7	.395
Cal State Northridge ‍‍‍	1	–	5	–	4	.300	1	–	13	–	5	.184
† – Conference champion ‡ – 2023 Big West Tournament champion y – Invited to the NCAA Tournament; As of December 5, 2023; Rankings from United Soccer Coaches Poll; Source: The Big West Conference

The 2023 Big West Conference women's soccer tournament was the postseason women's soccer tournament for the Big West Conference held from October 29 to November 5, 2023. The Semifinals and Final of the five-match tournament took place at Titan Stadium in Fullerton, California and the higher seed hosted First Round games. The six-team single-elimination tournament consisted of three rounds based on seeding from regular season conference play. The defending champions were the UC Irvine Anteaters. The Anteaters successfully defended their title as the fifth seed, defeating Cal Poly 1–0 in the Final. This was the fourth Big West tournament title for the UC Irvine program and the third for head coach Scott Juniper. UC Irvine and Juniper have now one three straight Big West Tournaments. As tournament champions, UC Irvine earned the Big West's automatic berth into the 2023 NCAA Division I women's soccer tournament.

== Seeding ==
The top six teams in the regular season earned a spot in the tournament and teams were seeded by regular season conference record. No tiebreakers were required as each team finished with a unique conference regular season record.

Seed	School	Conference Record	Points
1	Cal State Fullerton	6–1–3	21
2	UC Davis	6–2–2	20
3	Cal Poly	6–3–1	19
4	Long Beach State	5–3–2	17
5	UC Irvine	3–3–4	13
6	Hawaii	4–5–1	13

== Bracket ==
First round Saturday, Oct. 29
4	Long Beach State	0 (1)
5	UC Irvine (pen.)	0 (4)
3	Cal Poly	2
6	Hawaii	1

Semifinals; Thursday, Nov. 2
1	Cal State Fullerton	0
5	UC Irvine	1
2	UC Davis	1
3	Cal Poly	2

Final; Sunday, Nov. 5
5	UC Irvine	1
3	Cal Poly	0

== Schedule ==
=== Quarterfinals ===
October 29	#3 Cal Poly	2–1	#6 Hawaii	San Luis Obispo, CA
2:00 p.m. PT	Emily Lieber 1'; Peja Balanon 39'; Emily Nedom (yellow card) 67'; Sophia Minnite (yellow card) 84'	Report	(yellow card) 27', (goal) 67' Mia Foster; (yellow card) 79' Amber Gilbert; (red card) 82' Eve Bleam	Stadium: Mustang Memorial Field; Attendance: 524; Referee: Adam Zarrin; Assistant referees: Chris Gomez; Angeles Pineda; Fourth official: Faith Thurman

October 29	#4 Long Beach State	0–0 (a.e.t.) (1–4 p)	#5 UC Irvine	Long Beach, CA
6:00 p.m. PT	Brooklyn Antonucci (yellow card) 50'; Makayla Demelo (yellow card) 92'	Report		Stadium: George Allen Field; Attendance: 386; Referee: Brandon Stevis; Assistant referees: Steve Lane; Jessie Santamaria; Fourth official: Cesar Calderon
	Penalties
	Julia Moore (penalty missed); Aleea Caceres (penalty missed); Maddy Perez (penalty scored)		(penalty scored) Tati Fung; (penalty scored) Laila El Behery; (penalty scored) Erin Covey; (penalty scored) Marissa LeVine

=== Semifinals ===
November 2	#2 UC Davis	1–2	#3 Cal Poly	Fullerton, CA
4:30 p.m. PT	Bella Mayo 30'	Report	28' Emily Nedom; 81' (pen.) Jessie Halladay	Stadium: Titan Stadium; Attendance: 355; Referee: Frank Anderson; Assistant referees: Melissa Gonzalez; Kira Helmer; Fourth official: Yoel Miller

November 2	#1 Cal State Fullerton	0–1	#5 UC Irvine	Fullerton, CA
7:30 p.m. PT		Report	(yellow card) 48' Gianna Creighton; 49' Erin Covey; (yellow card) 62' Kiera Smeenge; (yellow card) 69' Madison Goerlinger	Stadium: Titan Stadium; Attendance: 1,112; Referee: Yoel Miller; Assistant referees: Adrian Gonzalez; Cameron Blanchard; Fourth official: Marissa Postlethwaite

=== Final ===
November 5	#3 Cal Poly	0–1	#5 UC Irvine	Fullerton, CA
1:00 p.m. PT		Report	40', (yellow card) 78' Mirayah Villalpando	Stadium: Titan Stadium; Attendance: 624; Referee: William Hoffman; Assistant referees: Melissa Gonzalez; Amanda Dibiasio; Fourth official: Abdel Hakeem Wakil

== Statistics ==
=== Goalscorers ===
There were 8 goals scored in 5 matches, for an average of 1.6 goals per match (as of November 5, 2023).

1 goal

- Peja Balanon – Cal Poly
- Jessie Halladay – Cal Poly
- Emily Lieber – Cal Poly
- Emily Nedom – Cal Poly
- Mia Foster – Hawaii
- Bella Mayo – UC Davis
- Erin Covey – UC Irvine
- Mirayah Villalpando – UC Irvine
