= Addison Halpern =

American soccer player (born 2006)

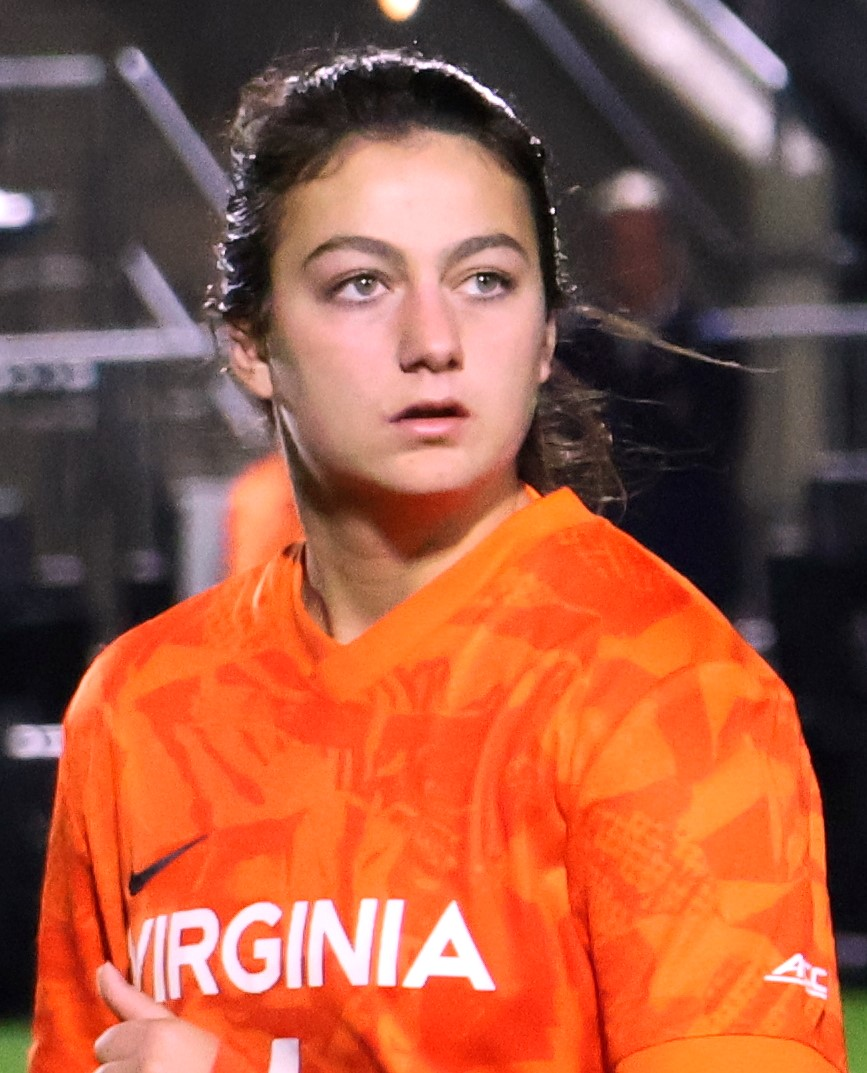
- Halpern with Virginia in 2025

Personal information
- Full name: Addison Claire Halpern
- Date of birth: December 5, 2006 (age 19)
- Height: 5 ft 6 in (1.68 m)
- Positions: Forward; midfielder

Team information
- Current team: Virginia Cavaliers
- Number: 6

Youth career
- PDA
- 2021–2024: Rutgers Prep Argonauts

College career
Years	Team	Apps	(Gls)
2025–	Virginia Cavaliers	39	(15)

Senior career*
Years	Team	Apps	(Gls)
2025	Paisley Athletic	8	(8)

International career^{‡}
2022	United States U-16	3	(0)
2024–2025	United States U-19	5	(1)
- * Club domestic league appearances and goals ‡ National team caps and goals as of February 26, 2025

Addison Claire Halpern (born December 5, 2006) is an American college soccer player who plays as a forward or midfielder for the Virginia Cavaliers. She was named the Gatorade National Player of the Year in 2025. She won bronze with the United States at the 2024 FIFA U-20 Women's World Cup.

== Early life ==
Halpern grew up in Middlesex, New Jersey. Her father, Eric, was an assistant coach for her high school team at Rutgers Preparatory School. In her sophomore year in 2022, she scored a career-high 51 goals and helped the team to the first of three consecutive Non-Public B state titles. She was named the NJ.com Player of the Year in 2023 after leading Rutgers Prep to the national No. 1 ranking for the first time. After missing the start of her senior season at the 2024 FIFA U-20 Women's World Cup, she returned to lead the team to a perfect 23–0 record. She was again named the NJ.com Player of the Year in 2024 and received the Gatorade National Player of the Year and United Soccer Coaches National Player of the Year awards. She scored 180 goals during her four years at Rutgers Prep, second-most in New Jersey high school history behind Laura Kerrigan. With youth club PDA, she earned ECNL All-American honors three times. She was ranked by TopDrawerSoccer as the No. 5 prospect of the 2025 class.

== College career ==
Halpern enrolled early at the University of Virginia in the spring of 2025. That summer, she played for Paisley Athletic in the USL W League and was named the league's Young Player of the Year after scoring 8 goals in 8 games. She was an immediate starter for the Virginia Cavaliers as a freshman in 2025. The team made the ACC tournament semifinals and earned a one seed in the NCAA tournament, with Halpern scoring twice in the NCAA tournament before losing in the third round on penalties. She finished her freshman season with 4 goals and 3 assists in 22 games.

== International career ==
Halpern trained and played friendlies with the United States under-16 team in 2021 and 2022. After playing for the under-19s, she joined the under-20 team as a training player before the 2024 FIFA U-20 Women's World Cup in Colombia. She was added to the World Cup roster after Sam Courtwright suffered an injury, making her the youngest player in the squad. She was unused in the competition as the team took the bronze medal.

== Honors and awards ==
United States U-20

- FIFA U-20 Women's World Cup bronze medal: 2024

Individual

- First-team All-ACC: 2026
- ACC all-freshman team: 2025
- Gatorade National Female Soccer Player of the Year: 2025
- USL W League Young Player of the Year: 2025
