= Steve Swanson (soccer) =

American soccer coach

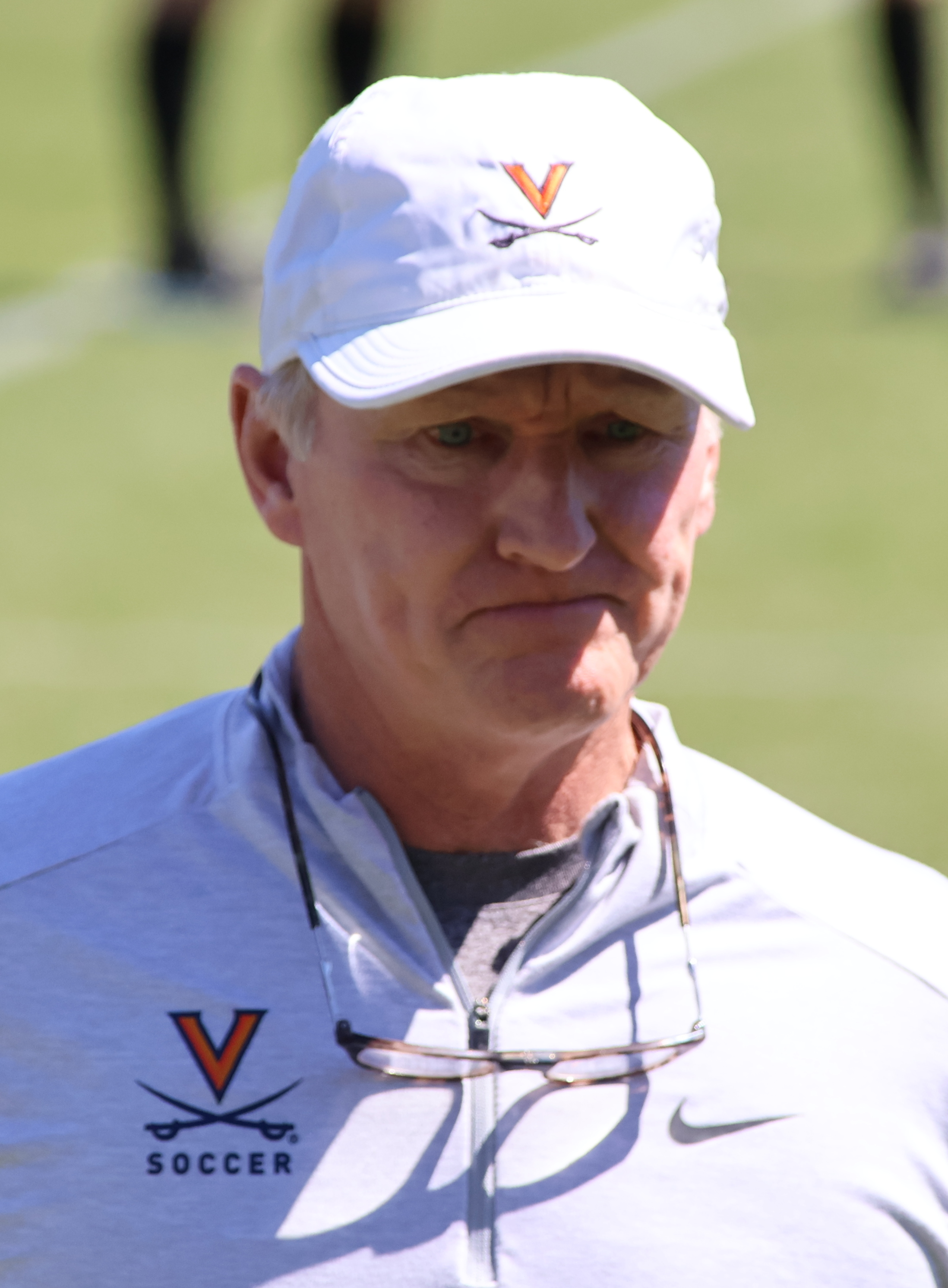
- Swanson with Virginia in 2026

Personal information
- Full name: Steven Swanson
- Date of birth: c. 1963 (age 62–63)

Team information
- Current team: Virginia Cavaliers (head coach)

College career
Years	Team	Apps	(Gls)
1981–1983	Michigan State Spartans		

Senior career*
Years	Team	Apps	(Gls)
- Milwaukee Wave
- Chicago Shoccers
- Windsor Wheels

Managerial career
- 1990–1995: Dartmouth Big Green
- 1996–1999: Stanford Cardinal
- 2000–: Virginia Cavaliers
- 2000–2002: United States U-16
- 2000: United States U-18
- 2011–2012: United States U-20
- 2013–2014: United States U-23
- 2015–2019: United States (assistant)
- * Club domestic league appearances and goals

Steven Swanson (born c. 1963) is an American soccer coach who is the head coach of the Virginia Cavaliers women's soccer team, a position he has held since 2000.

== Career ==
Swanson played college soccer for the Michigan State Spartans and played professionally for four seasons in the United States and Canada. He was the head coach of the Dartmouth Big Green women's soccer team from 1990 to 1995, winning two Ivy League titles and making two NCAA tournament appearances. He was the head coach of the Stanford Cardinal women's soccer team from 1996 to 1999, winning two Pac-10 Conference titles and making three NCAA tournament appearances in four years. He was named the Pac-10 Coach of the Year in his last season at Stanford in 1999.

Swanson succeeded April Heinrichs as the head coach of the Virginia Cavaliers women's soccer before the 2000 season. He has established Virginia as one of nation's top programs, never failing to qualify for the NCAA tournament. He led Virginia to their first ACC championship in 2004, ending North Carolina's 15-year conference reign. He won the ACC championship for a second time in 2012. In 2013, he was named ACC Coach of the Year after Virginia went undefeated in the regular season and then reached the NCAA tournament semifinals for only the second time in program history. He led Virginia to their first national championship game in 2014, falling to Florida State. He was named ACC Coach of the Year again in 2015 and 2021. He made his third NCAA tournament semifinal appearance in 2020.

Swanson has helped develop multiple decorated players. He fostered the leadership qualities of Becky Sauerbrunn, who would become captain of the United States national team. He moved Emily Sonnett from midfielder to center back, leading her toward the versatility that helped her secure a place on the United States national team. He coached Morgan Brian to win the Hermann Trophy twice. C-Ville Weekly writes of his style: "[During practice] he's everywhere, dictating the pace and tone, demanding specific tactical adjustments, offering individual advice. That's where he does his work. During the game, he lets the team play."

Swanson was involved with the United States national team at multiple age levels. He served as head coach of the under-16, under-18, under-20, and under-23 teams. He led the under-20s to victory at the 2012 FIFA U-20 Women's World Cup. He was an assistant coach to Jill Ellis with the senior national team as they won the 2015 and 2019 FIFA Women's World Cups.
