= Lauren Gregg =

American soccer coach player (born 1960)

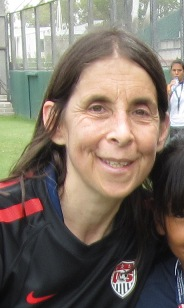

Personal information
- Full name: Lauren Gregg
- Date of birth: July 20, 1960 (age 66)
- Place of birth: Rochester, Minnesota, U.S.
- Height: 5 ft 6 in (1.68 m)
- Positions: Defender; midfielder

Team information
- Current team: Nigeria (women) (assistant coach)

Youth career
- –1978: Wellesley Raiders

College career
Years	Team	Apps	(Gls)
1978–1979	Lehigh Engineers (JV men)		(1)
1980	Harvard Crimson		(10)
1981–1982	North Carolina Tar Heels	44	(20)

Senior career*
Years	Team	Apps	(Gls)
1986–1988	Tacoma Cozars		

International career
1986	United States	1	(0)

Managerial career
- North Carolina Tar Heels (assistant)
- Harvard Crimson (assistant)
- 1986–1995: Virginia Cavaliers
- 1989–2000: United States (assistant)
- 1997: United States (stand-in)
- 1997–1999: United States U21
- 2000: United States (interim)
- 2021–2023: Nigeria (assistant)
- 2023-: Nigeria (assistant)
- * Club domestic league appearances and goals

Lauren Gregg (born July 20, 1960) is an American soccer coach and retired soccer player who played as a defender or midfielder. She made one appearance for the United States women's national soccer team in 1986. She was the first-ever female assistant coach for any of the United States' national teams between 1987 and 2000, and was interim head coach of the United States women's national soccer team in 1997 and 2000. As head coach of the women's soccer team at the University of Virginia from 1986 to 1995, Gregg was the first woman to lead a team to the NCAA Division I Final Four and to be named NSCAA Coach of the Year.

Gregg is a physician, as well as the co-author of The Champion Within: Training for Excellence.

== Playing career ==
Gregg attended Wellesley High School, where she competed in swimming and lettered in basketball, softball, field hockey, and soccer. She had played field hockey until soccer was offered at the school. Gregg attended Lehigh University and began playing for the women's soccer team, which only had club status. She later tried out for the men's junior varsity soccer team and earned a place in the squad. She was never included in the starting line-up for the team, though she did score a goal during her freshman season. She was also a member of the women's varsity basketball and lacrosse teams at the school. Gregg was honored with the John Steckbeck Award in 1979, awarded to the best first-year female student-athlete at Lehigh. After two years, she was admitted on a one-year visiting student status to Harvard University. She played for the Harvard Crimson women's team in 1980, which finished third at the AIAW women's soccer tournament, and scored ten goals for the team. Gregg was chosen as a First Team All-American in 1981, and was included in the ACC All-Conference Team and the All-Region Team.

After her visiting student term had ended at Harvard, Gregg enrolled at the University of North Carolina at Chapel Hill in 1981. She played for the North Carolina Tar Heels women's soccer team in 1981 and 1982. She helped North Carolina win the AIAW championship in 1981, and the first NCAA championship in 1982. During her college career, she scored 20 goals and recorded 14 assists in 44 games for the Tar Heels. Gregg was selected as an NSCAA Third Team All-American and was included in the AIAW All-Tournament Team in 1981, and in both seasons was selected in the ACC All-Conference Team and the All-Region Team. She was also included in the Academic All-America third team in 1983, and received the Marie James Award, a postgraduate scholarship.

Gregg earned one cap for the United States women's national soccer team in 1986.

== Coaching career ==
Gregg was the head coach for the women's soccer team at the University of Virginia from 1986 to 1995. During her tenure, she led the team to the NCAA Final Four in 1991 and seven consecutive NCAA tournament bids from 1988 to 1994. In 1990, she was named the NSCAA Coach of the Year becoming the first woman to receive the honor. She was also the first woman to lead a team to the NCAA Division I Final Four. She was an assistant coach for the United States women's national team that won the 1991 and 1999 Women's World Cups and gold at the 1996 Summer Olympics.

Gregg served as head coach for the United States under-21 women's national soccer team and guided the team to Nordic Cup championship titles in 1997 and 1999. She was the stand-in head coach of the U.S. national team for one match in 1997 against South Korea (which finished as a 6–1 win) as Tony DiCicco missed the match due to a family commitment. She again served as the interim head coach for three games in 2000 at the Australia Cup after DiCicco stepped down.

In 2007, Gregg was inducted into the Virginia–D.C. Soccer Hall of Fame for meritorious service.

In 2021, Gregg was chosen as an assistant for the Nigeria women's national team by head coach Randy Waldrum. Due to a power struggle between Waldrum and the Nigeria Football Federation, she was not allowed to travel with the team to the 2023 FIFA Women's World Cup.

== Personal life ==
Gregg was born in Rochester, Minnesota, to James Alan Gregg and Veronica Anne "Ronnie" Nowick, and has four siblings. At the age of ten, her family moved to Wellesley, Massachusetts. She graduated summa cum laude with a Bachelor of Arts in psychology from the University of North Carolina at Chapel Hill in 1983, and earned a Master of Education from Harvard University in 1985. Her daughter, Meilin Gregg, also is a member of the North Carolina Tar Heels women's soccer team.

== Career statistics ==
=== International ===
United States
Year	Apps	Goals
1986	1	0
Total	1	0

== Honors ==
=== Player ===
Harvard Crimson

- AIAW Women's Soccer Tournament third place: 1980

North Carolina Tar Heels

- AIAW Women's Soccer Tournament: 1981
- NCAA Division I Women's Soccer Championship: 1982

United States

- North America Cup: 1986

Individual

- First Team All-American: 1980
- NSCAA Third Team All-American: 1981
- ACC All-Conference Team: 1980, 1981, 1982
- All-Region Team: 1980, 1981, 1982
- AIAW All-Tournament Team: 1981
- Academic All-America Third Team: 1983

=== Coach ===
United States (as assistant coach)

- FIFA Women's World Cup: 1991, 1999; third place: 1995
- Women's Olympic Tournament: 1996

United States U21

- Nordic Cup: 1997, 1999; runner-up: 1998

Individual

- ACC Coach of the Year: 1989
- NSCAA Coach of the Year: 1991
- South Region Regional Coach of the Year: 1991
