= Lia Godfrey =

American soccer player (born 2001)

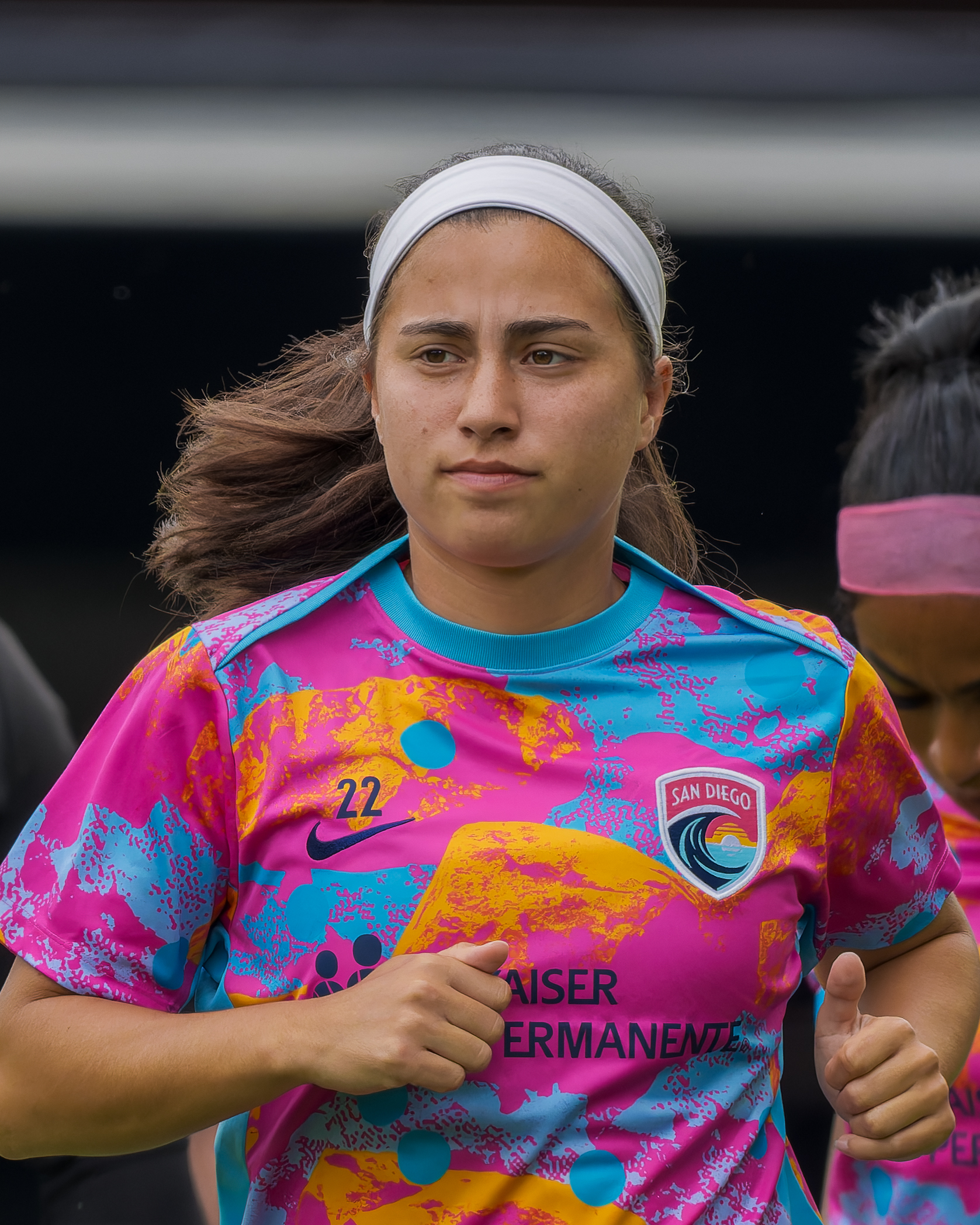
- Godfrey with San Diego Wave FC in 2026

Personal information
- Full name: Lia Eugenia Godfrey
- Date of birth: November 8, 2001 (age 25)
- Place of birth: Fleming Island, Florida, U.S.
- Height: 5 ft 4 in (1.63 m)
- Position: Midfielder

Team information
- Current team: San Diego Wave
- Number: 22

Youth career
- 2007–2015: Clay County SC
- 2015–2017: Jacksonville FC
- 2017–2020: United Soccer Alliance

College career
Years	Team	Apps	(Gls)
2020–2025	Virginia Cavaliers	107	(28)

Senior career*
Years	Team	Apps	(Gls)
2026–	San Diego Wave	30	(6)

International career
2016	United States U-15		
2016	United States U-16		
2016–2018	United States U-17	8	(4)
2020	United States U-19	3	(0)
2019	United States U-20	3	(0)
2023	United States U-23		
- * Club domestic league appearances and goals as of November 1, 2026

Lia Eugenia Godfrey (born November 8, 2001) is an American professional soccer player who plays as a midfielder for San Diego Wave FC of the National Women's Soccer League (NWSL). She played college soccer for the Virginia Cavaliers, earning All-American honors four times. She represented the United States at the 2016 FIFA U-17 Women's World Cup.

== Early life ==
Godfrey was born and raised in Fleming Island, Florida, the daughter of Tim and Stefannie Godfrey, and has a twin brother and older sister. Her father ran track at South Florida. She is of Italian and Filipino descent on her mother's side. Godfrey joined Clay County Soccer Club at age five, and her club coach tabbed her as "the next Morgan Brian" at an early age. She played DA club soccer for Clay County (which later became United Soccer Alliance) and ECNL soccer for Jacksonville FC. She was twice named United Soccer Coaches All-American, and TopDrawerSoccer ranked her as the tenth-best recruit of the 2020 class. She graduated from Fleming Island High School.

== College career ==
Godfrey started all but her first game with the Virginia Cavaliers as a freshman in 2020, a shortened season due to the COVID-19 pandemic. She scored 4 goals and led the Atlantic Coast Conference with 9 assists in 21 games, helping Virginia to both the ACC and NCAA tournament semifinals. She was named the ACC Freshman of the Year, TopDrawerSoccer National Freshman of the Year, second-team All-ACC, second-team United Soccer Coaches All-American, and first-team TopDrawerSoccer Best XI. She scored 3 goals and led the team with 12 assists as a sophomore in 2021, earning first-team All-ACC and second-team All-American honors. Virginia went undefeated in conference play to claim the ACC regular-season title, before losing to Florida State in the ACC tournament final and BYU in the NCAA tournament third round.

Godfrey with Virginia in 2025

Godfrey scored 8 goals with 5 assists in 23 games in her junior season in 2022, being named first-team All-ACC and first-team All-American. She scored a brace against Xavier in the NCAA tournament as Virginia made the quarterfinals. In 2023, she missed the entire season after suffering a knee injury in the spring. She came back to the field in 2024, scoring 2 goals with 3 assists in 19 games. She helped Virginia back into the NCAA tournament, which they had missed the year prior. She returned to form in her sixth and final season in 2025, starting all 22 games and scoring a career-high 11 goals with 4 assists. Virginia made the ACC tournament semifinals and earned a one seed in the NCAA tournament, losing in the third round on penalties. She was named first-team All-ACC, first-team All-American, and the ACC Midfielder of the Year.

== Club career ==
San Diego Wave FC announced on December 30, 2025, that they had signed Godfrey to her first professional contract on a two-year deal with options to extend another two years. She made her professional debut on March 14, 2026, as a second-half substitute for Gabi Portilho in a season-opening 1–0 loss to the Houston Dash. The following week, she scored her first professional goal with the late 2–1 winner over the Utah Royals. She was named NWSL Rookie of the Month after scoring three goals through four games, becoming the second Wave rookie to score in three consecutive games after Jaedyn Shaw. On October 2, she opened the scoring in a playoff-clinching 2–1 win over the Orlando Pride. Later that month, she signed a new three-year contract with the Wave through 2029. She ended the season with 6 goals (second among rookies) and 6 assists (leading all rookies) as San Diego placed second in the table but were upset 1–0 by the Utah Royals in the quarterfinals.

== International career ==
Godfrey received her first youth national team call-up at the under-15 level in 2015. The following year, at age 14, she played for the under-17 team and was the United States's youngest player at the 2016 FIFA U-17 Women's World Cup. She missed the 2018 FIFA U-17 Women's World Cup due to an ACL tear. She later appeared in friendlies at the under-19, under-20, and under-23 levels.

== Honors and awards ==
Virginia Cavaliers

- Atlantic Coast Conference: 2021

Individual

- NWSL Rookie of the Month: March 2026
- First-team All-American: 2022, 2025
- Second-team All-American: 2020, 2021
- First-team All-ACC: 2021, 2022, 2025
- Second-team All-ACC: 2020
- ACC Midfielder of the Year: 2025
- TopDrawerSoccer National Freshman of the Year: 2020
- ACC Freshman of the Year: 2020
