= Patchy Toledo =

Brazilian footballer and manager (born 1978)

Personal information
- Full name: Patrícia Araujo Toledo
- Date of birth: 15 August 1978 (age 48)
- Place of birth: São Paulo, Brazil
- Height: 5 ft 6 in (1.68 m)
- Positions: Midfielder; forward

Team information
- Current team: United States U-16 (head coach)

College career
Years	Team	Apps	(Gls)
2003–2006	West Florida Argonauts		

Senior career*
Years	Team	Apps	(Gls)
2007	Íþróttafélag Reykjavíkur	9	(1)
2008	San Diego United		
2009	OOH Lincoln Ladies	4	(1)

International career
- Brazil U-19

Managerial career
- 2022–: United States U-16
- * Club domestic league appearances and goals

Patrícia "Patchy" Araujo Toledo (born 15 August 1978) is a Brazilian football manager and former professional player who played as a midfielder and forward. Toledo is currently the head coach of the United States girls' national under-16 soccer team.

== Early life ==
Toledo signed for her first professional club at the age of 17 and played for Corinthians, Palmeiras and Flamengo in her native Brazil.

== College career ==
Toledo moved to the United States and after a spell at Cloud County Community College in Kansas, she attended the University of West Florida between 2003 and 2006. She won NCAA Division II All-South Region honours in 2005 and 2006.

== Club career ==
The Icelandic club Íþróttafélag Reykjavíkur signed Toledo for the 2007 season, but the club finished bottom of the league with seven points from 16 games. Toledo returned to the US for season 2008, with WPSL team SD United.

OOH Lincoln Ladies brought Toledo to England in October 2009. She made four league appearances and scored one goal, before departing in late December on account of the cold weather.

== International career ==
Toledo is a former Brazilian U19 international player.

== Managerial career ==
In August 2022, Toledo was named the head coach of the United States girls' national under-16 soccer team.
