= Katana Norman =

Filipino footballer (born 2004)

Personal information
- Full name: Katana Ameorfina De Guia Norman
- Date of birth: September 28, 2004 (age 22)
- Place of birth: Glendale, California, U.S.
- Height: 5 ft 8 in (1.73 m)
- Position: Defender

Team information
- Current team: VfB Stuttgart
- Number: 24

Youth career
- So Cal Blues FC

College career
Years	Team	Apps	(Gls)
2022–2024	Portland Pilots	57	(0)
2025	TCU Horned Frogs	16	(1)

Senior career*
Years	Team	Apps	(Gls)
2021–2025	SoCal FC	67	(2)
2026–	VfB Stuttgart	4	(0)

International career^{‡}
2024–	Philippines	6	(0)
- * Club domestic league appearances and goals as of 22 November 2026 ‡ National team caps and goals as of July 2, 2025

Katana Ameorfina De Guia Norman (born September 28, 2004) is a professional footballer who plays as a defender for Bundesliga club VfB Stuttgart. Born in the United States, she plays for the Philippines national team. She played college soccer for the Portland Pilots and the TCU Horned Frogs.

== Early life ==
Norman grew up in Arcadia, California, and attended Temple City High School. She played youth club soccer for So Cal Blues FC. While in high school Katana played on a semi-professional team, SoCal FC in the United Premier Soccer League (UPSL).

== College career ==
Norman began her collegiate career at the University of Portland. As a freshman in 2022, she appeared in 20 matches with 18 starts. She recorded her first assist in a match against Saint Mary's.

In 2023, she started all 17 matches, becoming one of five Pilots to start every game. She received All-West Coast Conference (WCC) Honorable Mention and was also named to the WCC All-Academic Honorable Mention list.

As a junior in 2024, she was one of two players to start every match for Portland. She was named to the United Soccer Coaches All-West Region Team and earned First Team All-WCC honors. Over three seasons with the Pilots, she made over 50 appearances, played more than 4,600 minutes, recorded five assists, and helped the team keep 30 shutouts. In 2025, she transferred to Texas Christian University.

== Club career ==
Norman joined the North Carolina Courage as a non-roster invitee in the 2026 preseason. In June 2026, Norman signed with VfB Stuttgart.

== International career ==
Norman was first called up to the Philippines women's national football team on February 15, 2024, ahead of the 2024 Pinatar Cup in Spain. She made her international debut in a friendly against Finland on February 21, 2024.

== Career statistics ==
=== Club ===
As of 22 November 2026

Appearances and goals by club, season and competition
Club	Season	League			National Cup (Note: Includes DFB-Pokal)		Total	
Club	Season	Division	Apps	Goals	Apps	Goals	Apps	Goals
VfB Stuttgart	2026–27	Frauen-Bundesliga	4	0	1	0	5	0
Career total			4	0	1	0	5	0

=== International ===
As of match played July 2, 2025

Appearances and goals by national team and year
National team	Year	Apps	Goals
Philippines	2024	3	0
Philippines	2025	3	0
Total		6	0
