= Sydney Becerra =

Mexican footballer (born 2004)

Personal information
- Full name: Sydney Elena Becerra Lewis
- Date of birth: 2 January 2004 (age 22)
- Place of birth: Texas, United States
- Height: 1.67 m (5 ft 6 in)
- Position: Attacking midfielder

Team information
- Current team: Pachuca
- Number: 12

College career
Years	Team	Apps	(Gls)
2022–2024	Texas A&M	60	(13)
2025	TCU	21	(6)

Senior career*
Years	Team	Apps	(Gls)
2026	Pachuca	3	(0)

International career
2026–	Mexico U23		
- * Club domestic league appearances and goals as of 9 February 2026

Sydney Elena Becerra Lewis (born 2 January 2004) is a professional footballer who plays as an Attacking midfielder for Liga MX Femenil side Pachuca. Born and raised in the United States, she represents Mexico internationally.

== Career ==
Becerra started her career in 2026 with Pachuca.

== International career ==
Since 2026, Becerra has been part of the Mexico U-23 team.
