= 2018 Big West Conference women's soccer tournament =

- Classification: Division I
- Teams: 4
- Matches: 3
- Attendance: 1,083
- Site: Anteater Stadium; Irvine, California
- Champions: Long Beach State (4th title)
- Winning coach: Mauricio Ingrassia (4th title)
- MVP: Dana Fujikuni (Long Beach State)
- Broadcast: BigWest.tv

2018 Big West Conference women's soccer standings
	Conf.						Overall
Team	W		L		T	PCT	W		L		T	PCT
Long Beach St ‍†‍‡‍^{y}	5	–	1	–	2	.750	12	–	6	–	3	.643
UC Santa Barbara ‍‍‍	5	–	2	–	1	.688	13	–	7	–	1	.643
UC Irvine ‍‍‍	4	–	1	–	3	.688	8	–	7	–	4	.526
UC Davis ‍‍‍	4	–	2	–	2	.625	7	–	8	–	4	.474
Hawaii ‍‍‍	4	–	4	–	0	.500	9	–	7	–	1	.559
UC Riverside ‍‍‍	2	–	4	–	2	.375	11	–	4	–	3	.694
Cal Poly ‍‍‍	2	–	4	–	2	.375	2	–	12	–	5	.237
Cal State Northridge ‍‍‍	2	–	6	–	0	.250	6	–	9	–	1	.406
Cal State Fullerton ‍‍‍	1	–	5	–	2	.250	4	–	12	–	3	.289
† – Conference champion ‡ – 2018 Big West Tournament champion y – Invited to the NCAA tournament As of November 13, 2018; Rankings from United Soccer Coaches Poll; Source:The Big West Conference

The 2018 Big West Conference women's soccer tournament was the postseason women's soccer tournament for the Big West Conference held on November 1 and 5, 2018. The three-match tournament took place at Anteater Stadium in Irvine, California. The four-team single-elimination tournament consisted of two rounds based on seeding from regular season conference play. The defending champions were the Cal State Fullerton Titans, but they failed to qualify for the 2018 tournament. The Long Beach State won the title by beating the UC Santa Barbara Gauchos 1–0 in the final. This was the fourth Big West tournament title for the Long Beach State program and the fourth for head coach Mauricio Ingrassia.

== Bracket ==
Semifinals; Thursday, November 1
1	Long Beach St	1
4	UC Davis	0
2	UC Santa Barbara	1
3	UC Irvine	0

Final; Sunday, November 4
1	Long Beach St	2
2	UC Santa Barbara	0

== Schedule ==
=== Semifinals ===
November 1, 2018	#1 Long Beach St	1–0	#4 UC Davis	Irvine, California
5:00 p.m. PST	Dana Fujikuni 48'; Sarah Maher (yellow card) 75'	Report	Casey Palmer (yellow card) 52'; Margot Ridgeway (yellow card) 56'	Stadium: Anteater Stadium; Referee: Randy Hoffman; Assistant referees: Hakeen Wakil; Andie Reyes; Fourth official: TJ McCree

November 1, 2018	#2 UC Santa Barbara	1–0	#3 UC Irvine	Irvine, California
7:30 p.m. PST	Hannah Wendelken 1'	Report		Stadium: Anteater Stadium; Attendance: 626; Referee: Leszek Stalmach; Assistant referees: Melissa Gonzalez; TJ McCree; Fourth official: Andie Reyes

=== Final ===
November 4, 2018	#1 Long Beach St	2–0	#2 UC Santa Barbara	Irvine, California
1:00 p.m. PST	Ashley Gonzales 25'; Dana Fujikuni 55'	Report		Stadium: Anteater Stadium; Attendance: 457; Referee: Adrian Gonzalez; Assistant referees: Kristin Patterson; Ahmed Ibrahim; Fourth official: Wale Animashaun

== Statistics ==
=== Goalscorers ===
2 Goals

- Dana Fujikuni - Long Beach State

1 Goal

- Ashley Gonzales - Long Beach State
- Hannah Wwndelken - UC Stanta Barbara

== See also ==
- Big West Conference
- 2018 NCAA Division I women's soccer season
- 2018 NCAA Division I Women's Soccer Tournament
- 2018 Big West Conference Men's Soccer Tournament
