= UC Irvine Anteaters women's soccer =

American college soccer team

- Founded: 1984; 42 years ago
- University: University of California, Irvine
- Head coach: Scott Juniper (19th season)
- Conference: Big West
- Location: Irvine, California, US
- Stadium: Anteater Stadium (capacity: 2,500)
- Nickname: Anteaters, UCI
- Colors: Blue and gold
Home	Away

NCAA tournament Round of 16
- 2010, 2022, 2023

NCAA tournament Round of 32
- 2010, 2021, 2022, 2023

NCAA tournament appearances
- 2010, 2011, 2021, 2022, 2023

Conference tournament championships
- 1997, 2021, 2022, 2023

Conference regular season championships
- 2010, 2011, 2017, 2021

The UC Irvine Anteaters women's soccer team represents the University of California, Irvine in NCAA Division I college soccer. UC Irvine competes in the Big West Conference. The Anteaters are coached by Scott Juniper. Having coached there since 2007, Juniper has led the squad to all five of their NCAA appearances.

== History ==
The UC Irvine women's soccer program started in 1984 at the NCAA Division I level, and were Independent to start. They joined the Big West Conference in 1996, once the Big West began sponsorship.

UC Irvine has been Big West tournament champions four times: in 1997, 2021, 2022, and 2023. Three such wins have been over Cal Poly.

UC Irvine has been to the NCAA tournament five times. Twice as an at-large bid, and the remaining three times as automatic bids. The Anteaters have appeared in the Round of 16 three times: 2010, 2022, and 2023.

In 2023, the Anteaters won their most recent Big West Championship, and third consecutive, defeating Cal Poly 1–0. They would go on to upend No. 1 seed and defending national champion UCLA 1–0 with a shot in the final minutes, only the second team in NCAA history to ever do so. They would follow up with a win over Gonzaga, defeating the then No. 19 team in the country 2–1. The second win marked the first time in NCAA history a team that upset a No. 1 seed made it to the Round of 16. Their run would come to an end with a loss to No. 15 Nebraska, losing 0–4. The 2023 squad finished the season ranked 20th in the nation.

== Postseason ==
The UC Irvine Anteaters women's soccer team have an NCAA Division I Tournament record of 6–5–1 through five appearances.

Year	Round	Opponent	Result
2010	First Round; Second Round; Third Round	Arizona State; Wake Forest; Washington	W 2–1; W 2–0; L 0–1
2011	First Round	San Diego	D 2–2 (PK 3-5)
2021	First Round; Second Round	UCLA; Wisconsin	W 1–0; L 0–3
2022	First Round; Second Round; Third Round	USC; Brown; No. 1 Alabama	W 2–0; D 1–1 (PK 4–2); L 1–3
2023	First Round; Second Round; Third Round	No. 2 UCLA; Gonzaga; Nebraska	W 1–0; W 2–1; L 0–4

== Yearly records ==
Below is a table of the program's yearly records.

Season	Coach	Overall	Conference	Standing	Postseason
Independent (Division I) (1984–1996)
1984	N/A	6–9–1	—	—	
1985	N/A	3–13–4	—	—	
1986	N/A	8–10–2	—	—	
1987	N/A	8–10–2	—	—	
1988	N/A	5–12–5	—	—	
1989	Steve Shaw	5–11–4	—	—	
1990	Keith Comfort	6–11–3	—	—	
1991	Keith Comfort	12–7–1	—	—	
1992	Keith Comfort	9–8–2	—	—	
1993	Keith Comfort	12–8	—	—	
1994	Marine Cano	9–8–3	—	—	
1995	Marine Cano	12–4–3	—	—	
Independent:		95–100–30	—		
Big West Conference (Big West) (1996–present)
1996	Marine Cano	13–7–2	4–1–1	—	
1997	Marine Cano	15–7	4–2	—	
1998	Marine Cano	14–3–3	7–1–1	—	
1999	Marine Cano	6–10–4	3–4–2	—	
2000	Marine Cano	10–7–2	5–3	—	
2001	Marine Cano	7–9–1	4–4–1	—	
2002	Marine Cano	8–10–1	5–3–1	—	
2003	Marine Cano	10–5–5	4–2–3	—	
2004	Marine Cano	4–14–2	1–8	—	
2005	Marine Cano	5–12–2	1–5–1	—	
2006	Marine Cano	3–13–1	0–7	—	
2007	Scott Juniper	11–8–2	5–2–1	—	
2008	Scott Juniper	8–9–2	2–4–2	—	
2009	Scott Juniper	12–7–2	4–4–1	—	
2010	Scott Juniper	19–3–2	8–0	1st	NCAA Third Round
2011	Scott Juniper	14–4–3	6–1–1	1st	NCAA First Round
2012	Scott Juniper	9–8–4	5–1–3	—	
2013	Scott Juniper	11–7	6–2	—	
2014	Scott Juniper	7–9–3	3–4–1	6th	
2015	Scott Juniper	7–11–1	3–5	7th	
2016	Scott Juniper	13–7–2	5–2–1	4th	
2017	Scott Juniper	10–6–4	5–2–1	1st	
2018	Scott Juniper	8–7–4	4–1–3	3rd	
2019	Scott Juniper	4–12–2	3–3–2	6th	
2020	Scott Juniper	No season held due to Covid-19	No season held due to Covid-19	—	
2021	Scott Juniper	16–6	8–2	1st	NCAA Second Round
2022	Scott Juniper	11–6–7	3–2–5	6th	NCAA Third Round
2023	Scott Juniper	10–8–6	3–3–4	T–6th	NCAA Third Round
2024	Scott Juniper	6–7–6	4–2–4	T–4th	
2025	Scott Juniper	8–5–7	5–2–3	T–4th	
Big West:		279–227–80	120–82–42		
Total:		374–327–110			
National champion Postseason invitational champion Conference regular season champion Conference regular season and conference tournament champion Division regular season champion Division regular season and conference tournament champion Conference tournament champion
