= United States girls' national under-16 soccer team =

United States U-16
- Nickname(s): Team USA; The Stars and Stripes; The Yanks
- Association: United States Soccer Federation
- Confederation: CONCACAF (North America)
- Head coach: Katie Schoepfer
- FIFA code: USA
First colors	Second colors

The United States U-16 girls' national soccer team is a youth soccer team operated under the auspices of U.S. Soccer. Its primary role is the development of players in preparation for the senior national team, as well as bridging the development between the youth competition levels of the U-15 and the U-17.

== History ==
The U-16 team initially had no international competition and was used to prepare players for the U-19 level, at which the FIFA U-19 Women's World Championship was originally played.

The current incarnation of U-16s was re-instituted in February 2015 under coach Tricia Taliaferro. The team competed in the first women's edition of the Tournament of Nations (Torneo delle Nazioni) in Gradisca d'Isonzo, Italy, in April 2016. This tournament included the first-ever women's soccer game between the United States and Iran at any level, a 6–0 win for the United States with a hat trick from Summer Yates. Patchy Toledo became the head coach of the U-16s in August 2022.

== Tournament ==
=== Tournament of Nations (Since 2004) ===
Tournament of Nations (Torneo delle Nazioni) in Gradisca d'Isonzo, Italy, in April 2016.

== Results and schedule ==
The following is a list of match results in the last 12 months, as well as any future matches that have been scheduled.

Legend

Win Draw Lose Fixture

=== 2026 ===
January 10, 2026 Friendly	Germany	4–1	United States	Albir, Spain
	Wardjawand 10'; Rohns 27', 44'; Pospiech 59'	Report	Cabigon 47'	Stadium: Albir Garden Resort; Referee: Adrian López (SPA)

January 13, 2026 Friendly	Germany	3–3	United States	Albir, Spain
	Rohs 17'; Bienert 53', 87'	Report	Barrow 36'; White 37'; Cabigon 70'	Referee: Ismael Moreno (SPA)

January 15, 2026 Friendly	Belgium	0–4	United States	Oliva, Spain
		Report	Perrotta 35'; 49' (o.g.); Asekomhe 72'; Chinyadza 78'	Stadium: Oliva Nova Sports Center; Referee: Noelia González (SPA)

February 21, 2026 UEFA Development Tournament	Spain	2–0	United States	Antalya, Türkiye
		Report	Aljama 42'; Ros 90+2'	Stadium: Emirhan Sports Center Stadium; Referee: Benjamin Seferovic (DEN)

February 23, 2026 UEFA Development Tournament	Denmark	0–4	United States	Antalya, Türkiye
		Report	Gardner 17'; Edwards 38'; Bursey 78'; 81' (o.g.)	Stadium: Emirhan Sports Center Stadium; Referee: Oswaldo Contreras (ECU)

February 26, 2026 UEFA Development Tournament	England	2–3	United States	Antalya, Türkiye
	Junaid 15'; Sinclair 35' (pen.)	Report	Walbruch 38' (pen.); Rountree 41'; Busey 61'	Stadium: Emirhan Sports Center Stadium; Referee: Benjamin Seferovic (DEN)

April 22, 2026 L'Albir WU16 2026 International	Netherlands	0-0	United States	L'Albir, Spain
		Report

April 25, 2026 L'Albir WU16 2026 International	Spain	1-3	United States	L'Albir, Spain
	Casanovas Alvarez 79'	Report	10' (o.g.); Walbruch 37'; Cabigon 56'

April 28, 2026 L'Albir WU16 2026 International	Sweden	1–4	United States	L'Albir, Spain
	Jernstöm 18'	Report	Cabigon 7', 41', 63'; Ortiz 86'

July 29, 2026 friendly	United States	3–0	Mexico	Fayetteville, Georgia
	Yakel 23'; Bursey 45+1'; Staats 81'	Report		Stadium: U.S. Soccer National Training Center; Referee: Shevah Rezaee (USA)

August 1, 2026 friendly	United States	7–0	Mexico	Fayetteville, Georgia
	Ohm 3', 13'; Orrico 9', 35'; Yu 16'; Yoshimura 50'; Cabigon 75'	Report		Stadium: U.S. Soccer National Training Center; Referee: Mary Fernandez (USA)

== Players ==
=== Current squad ===
24 players were called up for the September 2026 training camp.

Caps and goals are current as of April 28, 2026 after match against the Mexico.

No.	Pos.	Player	Date of birth (age)	Caps	Goals	Club
	GK	Gwyneth Provost	(15)	0	0	(United States Soccer Federation) Indy Premier SC
	GK	Fynlee Devine	(15)	0	0	(United States Soccer Federation) Bay Area Surf SC
	GK	Paige Miles	(15)	0	0	(United States Soccer Federation) Mustang SC
	FW	Bonnie Earl	(15)	0	0	(United States Soccer Federation) San Diego Surf SC
	FW	Erin Gonzalez	(15)	0	0	(United States Soccer Federation) Solar SC
	DF	Claire Hansen	(15)	0	0	(United States Soccer Federation) Pateadores SC
	DF	Hollace Larabee	(15)	0	0	(United States Soccer Federation) San Diego Surf SC
	DF	MJ Ly	(15)	0	0	(United States Soccer Federation) Arlington SA
	DF	Khloe Smith	(15)	0	0	(United States Soccer Federation) VDA
	DF	Cambria Williams	(15)	0	0	(United States Soccer Federation) Eclipse Select SC
	DF	Aniah Zembrodt	(15)	0	0	(United States Soccer Federation) Kings Hammer FC
	MF	Angelica Alzugaray	(15)	0	0	(United States Soccer Federation) Cincinnati United SC
	MF	Riley Broad	(15)	0	0	(United States Soccer Federation) Players Development Academy
	MF	Makenna Misa	(15)	0	0	(United States Soccer Federation) Albion SC
	MF	Brooklyn Robbins	(15)	0	0	(United States Soccer Federation) KC Current II
	MF	Aubrey Taylor	(15)	0	0	(United States Soccer Federation) San Diego Surf SC
	MF	Olivia Winters	(15)	0	0	(United States Soccer Federation) Eclipse Select SC
	FW	Anna Change	(15)	0	0	(United States Soccer Federation) Virginia Development Academy
	MF	Kate Cintron	(15)	0	0	(United States Soccer Federation) Southern California Blues SC
	FW	Arianni Hodge	(15)	0	0	(United States Soccer Federation) Sting Austin
	FW	Michelle Myers	(15)	0	0	(United States Soccer Federation) Beach Futbol Club
	FW	Ava Sadlowski	(15)	0	0	(United States Soccer Federation) Albion Hurricanes FC
	FW	Marley Skalski	(15)	0	0	(United States Soccer Federation) Western New York Flash
	FW	Emilia Sousa	(15)	0	0	(United States Soccer Federation) New England FC Red

=== Recent call-ups ===
The following players have been called up in the past 12 months.

- August 2026 friendlies.
- May 2026 training camp.
- April 2026 friendlies.
- UEFA Development Tournament
- January 2026 friendlies.

Pos.	Player	Date of birth (age)	Caps	Goals	Club	Latest call-up
GK	Carmen O'Dea	(15)	5	0	(Spain) FC Barcelona Academy	August 2026 friendlies
GK	Camille Barrett	(15)	1	0	(United States) Solar SC	August 2026 friendlies
GK	Hannah Gorman	(15)	5	0	(United States) Cleveland Force SC	August 2026 friendlies
GK	Isabella Kelsey	(15)	0	0	(United States) Baltimore Celtic SC	May 2026 training camp
GK	Olivia Newcome	(15)	0	0	(United States) Charlotte SA	May 2026 training camp
GK	Gabby Gjeldum	(15)	4	0	(United States) Galaxy SC	April 2026 friendlies
GK	Kaylin Hoffman	(15)	3	0	(United States) Beadling SC	April 2026 friendlies
GK	Molly Gaffney	(15)	2	0	(United States) Real Colorado	UEFA Development Tournament
GK	Olivia Hasan	(15)	4	0	(United States) Eclipse Select SC	January 2026 friendlies
DF	Cali Hejduk	(15)	10	0	(United States) Columbus United SC	August 2026 friendlies
DF	Harper Remington	(15)	1	0	(United States) Forms Academy	August 2026 friendlies
DF	Brielle Hopkins	(15)	8	0	(United States) Charlotte SA	August 2026 friendlies
DF	Cassie Travers	(15)	8	0	(United States) Mountain View Los Altos SC	August 2026 friendlies
DF	Tian Ettelson	(15)	2	0	(United States) New York SC	August 2026 friendlies
DF	Addison Staats	(15)	5	1	(United States) Solar SC	August 2026 friendlies
DF	Emma Sullivan	(15)	4	0	(United States) San Juan SC	August 2026 friendlies
DF	Lilly Yakel	(15)	5	1	(United States) Portland Thorns Academy	August 2026 friendlies
DF	Mercy Karson	(15)	8	0	(United States) Mustang SC	August 2026 friendlies
DF	Nina Clement	(15)	0	0	(United States) FC Stars	May 2026 training camp
DF	Samara House	(15)	0	0	(United States) Maryland United FC	May 2026 training camp
DF	Madison Kline	(15)	7	0	(United States) St. Louis Scott Gallagher SC	April 2026 friendlies
DF	Carolyn Voss	(15)	6	0	(United States) Minnesota Thunder	April 2026 friendlies
DF	Dorothea Perry	(15)	8	0	(United States) Mountain View Los Altos SC	April 2026 friendlies
DF	Kendra Kates	(15)	2	0	(United States) Albion Hurricanes FC	UEFA Development Tournament
DF	Ally Damron	(15)	4	0	(United States) San Diego Surf SC Academy	January 2026 friendlies
MF	Hannah Yu	(15)	5	1	(United States) Nationals SC	August 2026 friendlies
MF	Zoey Nelson	(15)	2	0	(United States) San Diego Surf SC	August 2026 friendlies
MF	Flo Ibsen	(15)	2	0	(United States) Mountain View Los Altos SC	August 2026 friendlies
MF	Kiyomi Yoshimura	(14)	3	0	(United States) Mountain View Los Altos SC	August 2026 friendlies
MF	Natalia Hanson	(15)	5	0	(United States) Penn Fusion SA	August 2026 friendlies
MF	Avery Walbruch	(15)	10	2	(United States) La Roca FC	August 2026 friendlies
MF	Valentina Perrotta	(15)	10	1	(United States) Bethesda SC	August 2026 friendlies
MF	Isabella Ortiz	(15)	8	1	(United States) Florida United Soccer Club	May 2026 training camp
MF	Ella Bott	(15)	0	0	(United States) Slammers FC HB Koge	May 2026 training camp
MF	Reese Brickwood	(15)	0	0	(United States) Internationals SC	May 2026 training camp
MF	Camila Fadiga	(15)	3	0	(United States) Florida Kraze Krush SC	May 2026 training camp
MF	Sadie Siedel	(15)	6	0	(United States) Mustang SC	April 2026 friendlies
MF	Samaya Khaleel	(15)	3	0	(United States) Florida Kraze Krush SC	April 2026 friendlies
MF	Mia Sommers	(15)	3	0	(United States) FC Prime	UEFA Development Tournament
MF	Sofia White	(15)	3	0	(United States) Bethesda SC	UEFA Development Tournament
MF	Carly Barnes	(15)	3	0	(United States) Penn Fusion SA	UEFA Development Tournament
MF	Brynlie Ward	(15)	5	0	(United States) FC Dallas	UEFA Development Tournament
MF	Makenna Mitchell	(15)	3	0	(United States) City SC San Diego	January 2026 friendlies
FW	Dylan Ohm	(15)	5	2	(United States) Penn Fusion SA	August 2026 friendlies
FW	Kayleigh Cabigon	(15)	10	7	(United States) San Diego Surf SC Academy	August 2026 friendlies
FW	Anaya Bursey	(15)	8	3	(United States) Real Colorado	August 2026 friendlies
FW	Elan Orrico	(15)	2	2	(United States) Northwest Indiana Lions United	August 2026 friendlies
FW	Ava Penn	(15)	2	0	(United States) Los Angeles Breakers FC	August 2026 friendlies
FW	Tatum Gardner	(15)	6	1	(United States) Arizona Arsenal SC	May 2026 training camp
FW	Ellie Snyder	(15)	0	0	(United States) Oklahoma Energy FC	May 2026 training camp
FW	Addison Stout	(15)	3	0	(United States) Mustang SC	May 2026 training camp
FW	Caroline Barrow	(15)	8	1	(United States) Albion Hurricanes FC	April 2026 friendlies
FW	Koi Edwards	(15)	6	1	(United States) Legends FC	April 2026 friendlies
FW	Stella Spitzer	April 4, 2010 (age 16)	3	0	(United States) Carolina Ascent FC	UEFA Development Tournament
FW	Riley Rountree	(15)	5	1	(United States) Eastside FC	UEFA Development Tournament
FW	Eileena Chinyadza	(15)	3	1	(United States) Michigan Hawks	January 2026 friendlies
FW	Lara Almeida	(15)	2	0	(United States) Orlando City Academy	January 2026 friendlies
FW	Ryder White	(15)	3	1	(United States) Virginia Development Academy	January 2026 friendlies
FW	Bridget Asekomhe	(15)	3	1	(United States) Albion Hurricanes FC	January 2026 friendlies

- INJ - Injured
- PRE - Withdrew prior to camp

== Coaches ==
- (United States) April Heinrichs
- (United States) Steve Swanson (2000–2002)
- (United States) Sue Patberg (2003–2005)
- (United States) Tricia Taliaferro
- (United States) Barry Ritson
- (United States) Katie Schoepfer
- (Brazil) Patchy Toledo (2022–2024)
- (United States) Ciara Crinion (2025)
- (United States) Katie Schoepfer (2025–)
