= Cal Poly Mustangs women's soccer =

American college soccer team

- University: California Polytechnic State University, San Luis Obispo
- Head coach: Bernardo Silva
- Location: San Luis Obispo, California, US
- Nickname: Mustangs
- Colors: Poly green, copper gold, and stadium gold

NCAA tournament Round of 32
- 1999

NCAA tournament appearances
- 1999, 2000, 2002, 2003, 2004, 2025

Conference tournament championships
- 1996, 2003, 2004, 2025

The Cal Poly Mustangs women's soccer team represents California Polytechnic State University, San Luis Obispo in NCAA Division I college soccer. Cal Poly competes in the Big West Conference. The Mustangs are led by head coach Bernardo Silva.

== History ==
The Cal Poly women's soccer program started in 1992 in the NCAA Division II level. Cal Poly moved to NCAA Division I in 1994 and joined the Big West Conference in 1996.

Cal Poly has been Big West tournament champions in 1996, 2003, 2004, and 2025.

Since moving to NCAA Division I in 1994, Cal Poly has been to the NCAA tournament in 1999, 2000, 2002, 2003, 2004, and 2025. They made the Round of 32 (second round) in 1999.

In 2025, the Mustangs won their first Big West championship since 2004, making their first NCAA tournament appearance in 21 years. In the 2025 Big West championship, Cal Poly defeated UC Santa Barbara 1-0 to secure the automatic bid.
