= NCAA Division I women's soccer tournament bids by school =

This is a list of NCAA Division I Women's Soccer Championship bids by school, through the 2025 tournament. Schools whose names are italicized are not currently in Division I. The tournament field has included 64 teams since 2001. Previous sizes have been 48 teams (1998–2000), 32 teams (1996–97), 24 teams (1994–95), 16 teams (1993), and 12 to 14 teams (1982–92). Division III teams were eligible for participation from 1982–85, and Division II teams were eligible from 1982–87.

Play-in games were held in 1997, 1999, and 2000. These games are not counted in this list, as the NCAA's record book does not mention them.

== Bids ==
Championship tournament participants						Last appearance by round				
Bids	School	Conference	Years	Last bid	Last win	R-16	QF	SF	F	Title (#)
45	North Carolina	ACC	1982–2026	2026	2025	2025	2024	2024	2024	2024 (22)
38	Virginia	ACC	1987–92, 1994–2022, 2024–26	2026	2025	2025	2020	2020	2014	
35	Santa Clara	WCC	1989–2007, 2009–13, 2015–24, 2026	2026	2024	2021	2021	2021	2020	2020 (2)
35	Stanford	ACC	1990–96, 1998–2019, 2021–26	2026	2025	2025	2025	2025	2025	2019 (3)
32	Connecticut	Big East	1982–2007, 2009–10, 2014–16, 2024	2024	2024	2015	2007	2003	2003	
32	Notre Dame	ACC	1993–2017, 2019, 2021–26	2026	2025	2024	2024	2010	2010	2010 (3)
32	Penn State	Big Ten	1995–2026	2026	2024	2024	2024	2015	2015	2015 (1)
31	Duke	ACC	1992–97, 1999–2001, 2003–13, 2015–22, 2024–26	2026	2025	2025	2025	2025	2015	
30	UCLA	Big Ten	1995, 1997–2014, 2016–26	2026	2025	2022	2022	2022	2022	2022 (2)
28	California	ACC	1983–84, 1986–88, 1993, 1998–2002, 2004–17, 2019, 2022, 2024	2024	2024	2005	1988	1988		
28	Texas A&M	SEC	1995–2020, 2022–23	2023	2023	2020	2020	2014		
27	BYU	Big 12	1997–2003, 2005–10, 2012–16, 2018–26	2026	2025	2025	2023	2023	2021	
27	Florida State	ACC	2000–26	2026	2025	2025	2025	2025	2025	2025 (5)
27	Wisconsin	Big Ten	1985, 1988–91, 1993–96, 1998, 2000, 2002, 2004–05, 2009–10, 2012, 2014, 2016–19, 2021, 2023–26	2026	2025	2024	1993	1991	1991	
26	Clemson	ACC	1994–2007, 2014–23, 2025–2026	2026	2025	2023	2023	2023		
25	Wake Forest	ACC	1996–2013, 2017–18, 2021–22, 2024–26	2026	2025	2024	2024	2024	2024	
25	West Virginia	Big 12	2000–20, 2022, 2024–26	2026	2025	2019	2016	2016	2016	
25	William & Mary	CAA	1984–90, 1992–2004, 2006–08, 2011, 2015	2015	2015	1999	1997			
24	UCF	Big 12	1982, 1984, 1987–88, 1991, 1998, 1999, 2001–04, 2007–15, 2017, 2022, 2025–2026	2026	2025	2014	2011	1987	1982	
23	USC	Big Ten	1998–2003, 2005–10, 2014–24	2024	2024	2024	2024	2016	2016	2016 (2)
22	Florida	SEC	1996–2001, 2003–17, 2019	2019	2017	2017	2017	2001	1998	1998 (1)
22	Portland	WCC	1992–98, 2000–13, 2022	2022	2022	2009	2009	2005	2005	2005 (2)
20	Milwaukee	Horizon	1997, 2001–02, 2005–06, 2008–13, 2018–26	2026	2021					
20	Ohio State	Big Ten	2002–04, 2007, 2009–13, 2015–18, 2020–26	2026	2025	2025	2025	2010		
20	South Carolina	SEC	1998, 2007–11, 2013–26	2026	2024	2022	2021	2017		
19	Auburn	SEC	2001–04, 2006–12, 2014–18, 2021, 2024, 2026	2026	2024	2016	2016			
19	Boston College	ACC	1982–85, 1999, 2001, 2003–13, 2015, 2018	2018	2013	2013	2013	2010		
19	Harvard	Ivy	1982, 1984, 1994, 1996–01, 2004, 2008–09, 2011, 2013–14, 2016, 2021–23	2023	2023	2000	1997			
19	Rutgers	Big Ten	1987, 2001, 2003, 2006, 2008–09, 2012–24	2024	2021	2021	2021	2021		
19	Texas	SEC	2001–08, 2010–11, 2014, 2017–19, 2021–24, 2026	2026	2024	2023				
18	Tennessee	SEC	2001–08, 2011–12, 2017–18, 2021–26	2026	2023	2021	2018			
18	Washington	Big Ten	1994–96, 1998, 2000–01, 2003–04, 2008–10, 2012, 2014, 2019–20, 2024–26	2026	2025	2025	2025			
17	Michigan	Big Ten	1997–2004, 2006, 2010, 2012–13, 2016, 2019, 2021, 2023, 2026	2026	2021	2021	2021			
17	NC State	ACC	1985–92, 1994–96, 2016–19, 2021–22	2022	2021	2019	1995	1989	1988	
16	Boston University	Patriot	2000–01, 2003, 2005–11, 2013–15, 2018, 2024, 2026	2026	2015					
16	Colorado	Big 12	2003–08, 2013–14, 2016–17, 2019–20, 2023–26	2026	2025	2025				
16	Georgetown	Big East	2007, 2010, 2012–25	2025	2025	2025	2018	2018		
15	Pepperdine	WCC	2001–05, 2011–12, 2014, 2016–17, 2019, 2021, 2023–25	2025	2021	2021				
15	Princeton	Ivy	1982–83, 1999–2004, 2008, 2012, 2015, 2017–18, 2021, 2023–24	2024	2023	2017	2017	2004		
15	UMass	A-10	1982–89, 1991–97	1997	1996	1996	1993	1993	1987	
15	Vanderbilt	SEC	1994–98, 2005–06, 2017–20, 2022, 2024–26	2026	2025	2025	2025			
15	Virginia Tech	ACC	2004, 2008–15, 2018–19, 2021–22, 2024, 2026	2026	2024	2024	2024	2013		
14	Central Connecticut	NEC	1998, 2002–05, 2008, 2014, 2018–23, 2026	2026	2019					
14	Kentucky	SEC	1995–96, 1998–99, 2001–02, 2006, 2011–14, 2024–26	2026	2014	2014				
14	Oklahoma State	Big 12	2003, 2006–11, 2013–14, 2016–17, 2019–20, 2024	2024	2020	2020	2011			
14	SMU	ACC	1990, 1992–93, 1995, 1997, 1999, 2001–06, 2016, 2021	2021	2021	1999	1995	1995		
14	Washington State	WCC	1994, 2000, 2002, 2008–09, 2011–15, 2017–19, 2021	2021	2021	2019	2019	2019		
13	Arkansas	SEC	2013–14, 2016–26	2026	2025	2024	2022			
13	Georgia	SEC	1997–98, 2001, 2003, 2007–09, 2011, 2014, 2022–25	2025	2023	2023				
13	Hartford	America East	1989–92, 1994–95, 1997–2002, 2006	2006	1999	1999	1999	1992		
13	Illinois	Big Ten	2000–01, 2003–08, 2010–13, 2025	2025	2013	2013	2004			
13	James Madison	Sun Belt	1995–99, 2002, 2004, 2007–08, 2010, 2015, 2023–24	2024	2010	2008				
13	Marquette	Big East	1999–2002, 2005–06, 2008–13, 2016	2016	2012	2012				
13	Maryland	Big Ten	1995–99, 2001–04, 2009–12	2012	2012	2011	1996			
13	Memphis	American	2007–11, 2016, 2018–23, 2025	2025	2025	2023				
13	Nebraska	Big Ten	1996–05, 2013, 2016, 2023	2023	2023	2023	1999			
13	San Diego	WCC	1996, 1999–2004, 2007–11, 2014	2014	2011	2011				
12	Denver	Summit	2001–03, 2006–09, 2012–13, 2017–18, 2020	2020	2020	2012				
12	Kansas	Big 12	2001, 2003–04, 2008, 2011, 2014, 2016, 2018–19, 2024–26	2026	2025	2025				
12	Minnesota	Big Ten	1995–99, 2008, 2010, 2013, 2015–16, 2018, 2024	2024	2024	2024				
11	Brown	Ivy	1982–86, 1994, 2019, 2021–23, 2026	2026	2023	1994	1984			
11	Colorado College	MW	1984–91, 2006, 2012–13	2013	1991	1991	1991	1991	1989	
11	Dartmouth	Ivy	1993–94, 1996, 1998–2003, 2005, 2025	2025	2001	2001	1998			
11	Dayton	A-10	1999, 2001–2004, 2009–11, 2014, 2016, 2025	2025	2010	2001				
11	George Mason	A-10	1982–86, 1988–89, 1993–94, 1996–97	1997	1997	1997	1993	1993	1993	1985 (1)
11	LSU	SEC	2007–09, 2011, 2015, 2018, 2021–22, 2024–25	2025	2025	2025				
11	Texas Tech	Big 12	2012–16, 2018–19, 2023–26	2026	2025	2023				
11	UNC Greensboro	SoCon	1996–98, 2000–01, 2003, 2006–07, 2010, 2017–18	2018	2009	1997				
10	Arizona State	Big 12	2000, 2002–03, 2009–10, 2012, 2014, 2020, 2022–23	2023	2020					
10	Hofstra	CAA	2005, 2007, 2010, 2012, 2015, 2017–19, 2021–22	2022	2021					
10	Liberty	C-USA	2000–01, 2005, 2013, 2015–16, 2020, 2023, 2025–2026	2026						
10	Ole Miss	SEC	2002–03, 2005, 2009, 2013, 2015, 2017–18, 2020–21	2021	2020	2020				
10	Radford	Big South	1985, 1998, 2002, 2008, 2011–12, 2018–19, 2022–23	2023	1985	1985				
10	Saint Louis	A-10	2005–06, 2018–24, 2026	2026	2024	2023				
10	Samford	SoCon	2005, 2007, 2011, 2016, 2019, 2021–22, 2024–26	2026	2021					
10	UC Santa Barbara	Big West	1984–87, 1989–91, 2008–09, 2024	2024	1990	1991	1990			
9	Cal State Fullerton	Big West	2001, 2005–07, 2013–15, 2017, 2019	2019	2006	2005				
9	Michigan State	Big Ten	2002, 2005, 2008–09, 2022–26	2026	2025	2025	2025			
9	South Dakota State	Summit	2008, 2014–16, 2019, 2021, 2023–25	2025	2008					
9	TCU	Big 12	2016–22, 2025	2025	2025	2025	2025	2025		
8	Alabama	SEC	1998, 2011, 2017, 2021–23, 2025–2026	2026	2023	2022	2022	2022		
8	Baylor	Big 12	1998–99, 2011–12, 2017–18, 2026	2026	2025	2025	2018			
8	Florida Gulf Coast	ASUN	2011–12, 2014–17, 2022–23	2023	2015					
8	Furman	SoCon	1999–2000, 2002, 2004, 2007, 2013, 2015, 2020	2020						
8	High Point	Big South	2003, 2007, 2009–10, 2014, 2017, 2021, 2025	2025						
8	Louisville	ACC	2006–07, 2011, 2013, 2018–19, 2025–2026	2026	2019	2011				
8	Monmouth	CAA	2007, 2009, 2013, 2016–19, 2021	2021						
8	Northwestern	Big Ten	1996, 1998, 2015–18, 2022, 2025	2025	2022	2022				
8	Oakland	Horizon	2001–03, 2006–07, 2011–12, 2015	2015	2012					
8	Purdue	Big Ten	2002–03, 2005–07, 2009, 2021, 2026	2026	2021	2003				
8	South Alabama	Sun Belt	2013–17, 2019–21	2021	2020					
8	South Florida	American	2010, 2014–15, 2017–21	2021	2020	2019				
8	Utah	Big 12	2002–06, 2013, 2016, 2019	2019	2016	2016				
8	Xavier	Big East	1998, 2000, 2019, 2021–23, 2025–2026	2026	2025					
7	Arizona	Big 12	2004–05, 2014–15, 2017–19	2019	2019	2017				
7	Bucknell	Patriot	2001, 2005, 2016–17, 2021–23	2023						
7	Cincinnati	Big 12	1983, 1986, 1994, 1997, 2001–02, 2015	2015	2002	2001				
7	Illinois State	MVC	2003, 2009, 2011–14, 2016	2016	2016					
7	Long Beach State	Big West	2008, 2010–12, 2015–16, 2018	2018	2011	2011	2011			
7	Loyola (MD)	Patriot	2001–04, 2007, 2009, 2012	2012						
7	Loyola Chicago	A-10	2003, 2006–07, 2018–21	2021						
7	Missouri	SEC	1999, 2003, 2007–08, 2012, 2014, 2016	2016	2014					
7	Montana	Big Sky	1999–2000, 2011, 2018, 2020–21, 2025	2025	2000					
7	North Texas	American	2004–05, 2012, 2015, 2017–19	2019						
7	San Diego State	MW	1998–99, 2009, 2012–14, 2017	2017	2012	2012				
7	Villanova	Big East	2001–04, 2006, 2009, 2026	2026	2006	2003				
6	Bowling Green	MAC	2004–05, 2018–21	2021						
6	Cal Poly	Big West	1999–2000, 2002–04, 2025	2025	1999					
6	Colgate	Patriot	1997–99, 2004, 2009, 2012	2012	2004					
6	Fairfield	MAAC	1997–99, 2005, 2008, 2024	2024						
6	Iowa	Big Ten	2013, 2019–20, 2023–25	2025	2025	2024				
6	Lipscomb	ASUN	2018–19, 2021, 2024–26	2026	2025					
6	Mississippi State	SEC	2018, 2022–26	2026	2024	2024				
6	Utah State	MW	2011–12, 2023–26	2026						
6	Utah Valley	WAC	2015, 2017, 2020, 2022, 2025–2026	2026	2020					
6	Western Michigan	MAC	2003, 2013, 2015, 2024–26	2026	2013					
5	Charlotte	American	1998, 2002, 2007–08, 2016	2016	2008					
5	Creighton	Big East	2002, 2004–05, 2007, 2010	2010						
5	Evansville	MVC	1998–99, 2001, 2008, 2015	2015						
5	Idaho State	Big Sky	2001–03, 2006, 2012	2012	2003					
5	Indiana	Big Ten	1996, 1998, 2007, 2013, 2023	2023	2013	2007				
5	La Salle	A-10	2011–14, 2017	2017						
5	Lamar	Southland	2017, 2019, 2022–23, 2026	2026						
5	Miami (FL)	ACC	2001, 2007–08, 2011–12	2012	2011					
5	Morehead State	OVC	2008, 2010, 2013, 2023–24	2024						
5	Navy	Patriot	2003, 2006–07, 2019–20	2020	2006					
5	Oklahoma	SEC	2003, 2010, 2014, 2016, 2026	2026	2016					
5	Old Dominion	Sun Belt	2006, 2021–23, 2026	2026						
5	Rice	American	2004–05, 2014, 2017, 2020	2020	2020	2020				
5	San Jose State	MW	2000, 2015, 2017–18, 2022	2022						
5	SIU Edwardsville	OVC	2014, 2016, 2020–22	2022	2016					
5	Seattle	WAC	2013–14, 2016, 2018–19	2019	2014					
5	Stony Brook	CAA	2012, 2017, 2019–20, 2024	2024						
5	Texas State	Sun Belt	2001, 2004, 2008, 2011, 2025	2025						
5	Toledo	MAC	2006–08, 2011, 2017	2017						
5	UC Irvine	Big West	2010–11, 2021–23	2023	2023	2023				
4	Cortland State	Independent	1982–85	1985	1985	1985	1985			
4	Eastern Illinois	OVC	2001–04	2004						
4	Fresno State	MW	1999, 2005, 2008, 2010	2010						
4	Jackson State	SWAC	2010, 2013, 2022, 2026	2026						
4	LIU (Note: All appearances to date were made by the team that represented Long Island University's Brooklyn campus, which competed at different times as LIU, Long Island, and finally LIU Brooklyn. In July 2019, LIU merged the Brooklyn athletic program with the Division II program of the university's Post campus. Since then, all of the university's varsity teams have competed as the LIU Sharks. The merged women's soccer team inherited Brooklyn's history and records.)	NEC	1999, 2006, 2011–12	2012						
4	Miami (OH)	MAC	2000–02, 2012	2012	2012					
4	Missouri State	MVC	2000, 2017, 2022, 2024	2024						
4	Murray State	MVC	2009, 2015, 2017–18	2018						
4	New Mexico	MW	2010–11, 2020–21	2021	2020					
4	Northeastern	CAA	2008, 2013–14, 2016	2016	2014					
4	Northern Arizona	Big Sky	2008–09, 2014, 2022	2022						
4	Oregon State	WCC	1994, 2009–11	2011	2010	2009				
4	Penn	Ivy	1999, 2001, 2007, 2010	2010						
4	Quinnipiac	MAAC	2000, 2022–23, 2026	2026						
4	Saint Francis (PA)	NEC	2010, 2013, 2016–17	2017						
4	St. John's	Big East	2009, 2013, 2015, 2021	2021	2021	2021				
4	Southeastern Louisiana	Southland	2009, 2013, 2015, 2020	2020						
4	Stephen F. Austin	Southland	2003, 2007, 2012, 2024	2024						
4	UNLV	MW	2004–06, 2016	2016						
4	Weber State	Big Sky	2004–05, 2013, 2026	2026	2005					
3	Alabama State	SWAC	2016–17, 2020	2020						
3	Albany	America East	2015–16, 2018	2018						
3	Army	Patriot	2008, 2011, 2025	2025						
3	Butler	Big East	2015, 2017, 2021	2021						
3	Central Michigan	MAC	2009–10, 2012	2012	2009					
3	DePaul	Big East	2003, 2013–14	2014						
3	Elon	CAA	1999, 2020, 2025	2025						
3	FIU	C-USA	1993, 2011, 2024	2024	1993	1993	1993			
3	Grambling State	SWAC	2006, 2023, 2025	2025						
3	Houston Christian	Southland	2014, 2016, 2025	2025						
3	Howard	SWAC	2015, 2018, 2024	2024						
3	Jacksonville	ASUN	2000, 2006, 2013	2013						
3	Loyola Marymount	WCC	2002, 2006, 2015	2015	2015	2015				
3	Maine	America East	2023–25	2025						
3	Mississippi Valley State	SWAC	2005, 2008, 2012	2012						
3	Northwestern State	Southland	2002, 2005, 2021	2021						
3	Prairie View A&M	SWAC	2014, 2019, 2021	2021						
3	Providence	Big East	1993, 2021, 2023	2023	1993	1993				
3	Sacramento State	Big Sky	2007, 2010, 2024	2024						
3	Saint Mary's	WCC	1988, 1994, 2001	2001	2001	1994				
3	Siena	MAAC	2010, 2015, 2020	2020						
3	UAB	American	2004, 2006, 2026	2026	2004					
3	UNC Wilmington	CAA	2009, 2015, 2026	2026	2015					
3	UT Martin	OVC	2011–12, 2026	2026						
3	UTSA	American	2010, 2022, 2025	2025						
3	Valparaiso	MVC	2005, 2014, 2023	2023						
3	Western Carolina	SoCon	2005, 2008, 2023	2023						
3	Wright State	Horizon	1998–2000	2000						
3	Yale	Ivy	2002, 2004–05	2005	2005	2005				
2	Abilene Christian	WAC	2018, 2026	2026						
2	Arkansas–Pine Bluff	SWAC	2009, 2011	2011						
2	Belmont	MVC	2008, 2019	2019						
2	Boise State	MW	2009, 2019	2019						
2	Buffalo	MAC	2015, 2022	2022						
2	Cal Baptist	WAC	2024–25	2025						
2	Cal State East Bay	Independent	1985–86	1986		1986				
2	Campbell	CAA	2004, 2020	2020						
2	Columbia	Ivy	2006, 2023	2023	2023					
2	Eastern Washington	Big Sky	2016–17	2017						
2	Fairleigh Dickinson	NEC	2015, 2022	2022						
2	Grand Canyon	WAC	2021, 2023	2023						
2	Gonzaga	WCC	2005, 2023	2023	2023					
2	IUPUI	Horizon	2009, 2017	2017						
2	Kennesaw State	C-USA	2007, 2009	2009						
2	Mercer	SoCon	2010, 2014	2014						
2	UMSL	Independent	1982–83	1983	1982	1983	1982	1982		
2	New Hampshire	America East	2014, 2022	2022						
2	Northern Colorado	Big Sky	2015, 2019	2019						
2	Oral Roberts	Summit	2004, 2026	2026						
2	Pittsburgh	ACC	2022–23	2023	2023	2023	2023			
2	Richmond	A-10	2000, 2002	2002	2002	2002				
2	Sacred Heart	MAAC	2001, 2025	2025						
2	Southeast Missouri State	OVC	2006–07	2007						
2	Syracuse	ACC	1998, 2001	2001	2001					
2	UNC Asheville	Big South	2006, 2026	2026						
2	VCU	A-10	2004–05	2005	2005					
2	Vermont	America East	1984, 2021	2021		1984				
1	Air Force	MW	2026	2026						
1	Alabama A&M	SWAC	2007	2007						
1	American	Patriot	2002	2002						
1	Barry	Independent	1987	1987		1987				
1	Binghamton	America East	2004	2004						
1	Birmingham–Southern	Big South	2004	2004						
1	Bryant	American East	2026	2026						
1	Cal State Northridge	Big West	2012	2012						
1	Davidson	A-10	2009	2009						
1	Detroit Mercy	Horizon	2004	2004	2004					
1	Drake	MVC	2006	2006						
1	Duquesne	A-10	2015	2015						
1	East Carolina	American	2024	2024						
1	Eastern Michigan	MAC	1999	1999						
1	Florida Atlantic	American	2005	2005						
1	George Washington	A-10	1996	1996						
1	Georgia Southern	Sun Belt	2012	2012						
1	Hawaii	Big West	2007	2007						
1	Holy Cross	Patriot	2000	2000						
1	Houston	Big 12	2026	2026						
1	Idaho	Big Sky	2023	2023						
1	Iowa State	Big 12	2005	2005						
1	Keene State	Independent	1983	1983		1983				
1	Kent State	MAC	2016	2016						
1	Lehigh	Patriot	2010	2010						
1	Little Rock	OVC	2018	2018						
1	Marist	MAAC	2011	2011						
1	McNeese State	Southland	2006	2006						
1	Middle Tennessee	C-USA	2010	2010						
1	Nevada	MW	2006	2006						
1	New Mexico State	C-USA	2022	2022						
1	Niagara	MAAC	2006	2006						
1	North Dakota State	Summit	2010	2010						
1	Northern Kentucky	Horizon	2016	2016						
1	Ohio	MAC	2023	2023						
1	Omaha	Summit	2022	2022						
1	Pacific	WCC	1998	1998	1998					
1	Rhode Island	A-10	2002	2002	2002					
1	Rider	MAAC	2014	2014						
1	Rochester	Independent	1982	1982		1982				
1	Southern	SWAC	2024	2024						
1	Southern Illinois	MVC	2026	2026						
1	Tennessee Tech	OVC	2025	2025						
1	Towson	CAA	2023	2023						
1	UC Riverside	Big West	2005	2005						
1	UIC	Missouri Valley	2025	2025						
1	UMBC	America East	2013	2013						
1	USC Upstate	Big South	2024	2024						
1	UTEP	C-USA	2005	2005	2005					
1	Wagner	NEC	2025	2025						
