= 2026 NCAA Division I women's soccer tournament =

2026 NCAA women's soccer tournament
Women's College Cup (Semifinals & Final)

Tournament details
- Country: United States
- City: Cary, North Carolina (College Cup)
- Venue: First Horizon Stadium (College Cup)
- Dates: November 20 – December 13, 2026
- Teams: 64

Tournament statistics
- Matches played: 0
- All statistics correct as of 11/18/2026.

The 2026 NCAA Division I women's soccer tournament is the 45th edition of the NCAA Division I women's soccer tournament, a postseason tournament to determine the national champion of NCAA Division I women's college soccer. The College Cup will be played on December 10 and December 13 at First Horizon Stadium in Cary, North Carolina, and televised on ESPN2.

Florida State are the defending national champion.

== Qualification ==
All Division I women's soccer programs were eligible to qualify for the tournament. 31 teams received automatic bids by winning their conference tournaments, and an additional 33 teams earned at-large bids based on their regular season records.

Automatic bids
Conference	Team	Date qualified	Record	Appearance	Last Bid
America East	Bryant	November 14	7–6–5	1st	None
American	UAB	November 14	12–8–1	3rd	2006
Atlantic 10	Saint Louis	November 15	13–2–5	10th	2024
ACC	North Carolina	November 15	14–2–0	45th	2025
ASUN	Lipscomb	November 13	9–4–7	6th	2025
Big 12	BYU	November 14	13–3–5	27th	2025
Big East	Villanova	November 14	14–1–5	7th	2009
Big Sky	Weber State	November 15	13–6–2	3rd	2013
Big South	UNC Asheville	November 15	9–4–6	2nd	2006
Big Ten	Purdue	November 13	17–2–3	8th	2021
Big West	Utah Valley	November 14	15–4–3	6th	2025
CAA	UNC Wilmington	November 14	13–0–7	3rd	2015
C-USA	Liberty	November 13	16–2–3	10th	2025
Horizon	Milwaukee	November 14	15–4–2	20th	2025
Ivy	Brown	November 15	12–4–2	11th	2023
MAAC	Quinnipiac	November 15	12–3–3	4th	2023
MAC	Western Michigan	November 13	12–4–4	6th	2025
Missouri Valley	Southern Illinois	November 15	15–4–0	1st	None
Mountain West	Air Force	November 14	12–5–3	1st	None
Northeast	Central Connecticut State	November 15	12–6–1	14th	2023
Ohio Valley	UT Martin	November 15	8–5–7	3rd	2012
Pac-12	Utah State	November 14	13–3–5	6th	2025
Patriot	Boston University	November 15	11–8–2	16th	2024
SEC	South Carolina	November 15	15–2–3	20th	2025
SoCon	Samford	November 15	13–2–6	10th	2025
Southland	Lamar	November 14	12–2–5	5th	2023
SWAC	Jackson State	November 15	11–6–3	4th	2022
Summit League	Oral Roberts	November 15	15–1–4	2nd	2004
Sun Belt	Old Dominion	November 15	10–3–7	5th	2023
UAC	Abilene Christian	November 14	10–2–8	2nd	2018
West Coast	Santa Clara	November 14	9–2–9	35th	2024

At-Large Bids
Conference	Team	Record	Appearance	Last Bid
ACC	Clemson	6–4–6	26th	2025
ACC	Duke	9–2–4	31th	2025
ACC	Florida State	8–2–3	27th	2025
ACC	Louisville	10–2–3	8th	2025
ACC	Notre Dame	14–2–0	32st	2025
ACC	Stanford	10–3–2	35th	2025
ACC	Virginia	9–3–3	38th	2025
ACC	Virginia Tech	7–5–5	15th	2024
ACC	Wake Forest	12–2–1	25th	2025
Big East	Xavier	13–3–4	8th	2025
Big Ten	Michigan	9–6–5	17th	2023
Big Ten	Michigan State	15–4–2	9th	2025
Big Ten	Ohio State	15–2–1	20th	2025
Big Ten	Penn State	9–4–5	32st	2025
Big Ten	UCLA	12–5–2	30th	2025
Big Ten	Washington	13–3–4	19th	2025
Big Ten	Wisconsin	11–4–5	27th	2025
Big 12	Baylor	17–4–1	8th	2025
Big 12	Colorado	15–4–2	16th	2025
Big 12	Houston	11–5–4	1st	None
Big 12	Kansas	13–5–2	12th	2025
Big 12	Texas Tech	13–3–4	11th	2025
Big 12	UCF	11–5–2	24th	2025
Big 12	West Virginia	9–4–5	25th	2025
SEC	Alabama	15–5–0	8th	2025
SEC	Arkansas	9–6–4	13th	2025
SEC	Auburn	8–3–7	19th	2024
SEC	Kentucky	9–6–3	14th	2025
SEC	Mississippi State	9–3–6	6th	2025
SEC	Oklahoma	11–6–2	5th	2016
SEC	Tennessee	7–5–4	18th	2025
SEC	Texas	11–5–5	19th	2024
SEC	Vanderbilt	16–1–1	14th	2025

== Bracket ==
The bracket was announced on Monday, November 16, 2026. First round games will be played on November 20 and 21 at the campus site of the seeded team.

=== North Carolina bracket ===
First round Campus Sites
1	North Carolina*	5
UNC Asheville	0
Washington (pen.)	0 (4)
8	Auburn*	0 (3)
5	Stanford*	2
Santa Clara	1
Jackson State	0
4	Alabama*	12
3	Duke*	3
UNC Wilmington	1
Western Michigan	0
6	Michigan*	2
7	West Virginia*	1
Old Dominion	0
Bryant	0
2	Virginia*	4

Second round Regional Campus Sites
1	North Carolina
Washington
5	Stanford
4	Alabama
3	Duke
6	Michigan
7	West Virginia
2	Virginia

Round of 16; Regional Campus Sites

Quarterfinal; Campus Sites

* Host institution

==== Schedule ====
===== First round =====
November 20	(2) Virginia	4–0	Bryant	Charlottesville, VA
3:00 p.m. EST	Kathryn Kelly 13'; Giovana Canali 58'; Olivia Rademaker 72'; Faith Broering 79'	Report	(yellow card) 73' Caitlin Forshay	Stadium: Klöckner Stadium; Attendance: 1,010; Referee: Richard Crowgey; Assistant referees: Kevin Uitto, George Vergara Jr. Fourth official: David Elliott

November 20	(6) Michigan	2–0	Western Michigan	Ann Arbor, MI
6:00 p.m. EST	Beanie Harshe 21'; Melisa Kekic (yellow card) 42'; Ella Jablinskey (yellow card) 57'; Elle Ervin 76'	Report	(yellow card) 59' June Mullen; (yellow card) 64' Kaiya Stewart	Stadium: U-M Soccer Stadium; Attendance: 1,787; Referee: Erin Patterson; Assistant referees: Audra Fullen, Christian Little; Fourth official: Ryan Homik

November 20	(7) West Virginia	1–0	Old Dominion	Morgantown, WV
7:00 p.m. EST	Abbey Olexa 3'	Report	(yellow card) 89' Dylan McEntarfer	Stadium: Dick Dlesk Soccer Stadium; Attendance: 723; Referee: Stephanie Serrano; Assistant referees: Emma Elwell, Sami Card; Fourth official: Ashley Smyda

November 20	(8) Auburn	0–0 (a.e.t.) (3–4 p)	Washington	Auburn, AL
6:30 p.m. CST	Allison Goodwin (yellow card) 53'; Jordyn Crosby (yellow card) 108'	Report	(yellow card) 106' Team; (yellow card) 110' Tanner Ijams	Stadium: Auburn Soccer Complex; Attendance: 1,003; Referee: Dorian Del Toro; Assistant referees: Tarver Pyke, Joshua Belk; Fourth official: Daniel Emeri
	Penalties
	Ava Caldwell (penalty scored); Clara Casajuana Vert (penalty scored); Gracie Brown (penalty missed); Kennedy Husbands (penalty scored); Grace Ivey (penalty missed)		(penalty missed) Alex Buck; (penalty scored) Anna Menti; (penalty scored) Jadyn Holdenried; (penalty scored) Taylor Thomas; (penalty scored) Lucy Newlin

November 20	(4) Alabama	12–0	Jackson State	Tuscaloosa, AL
7:00 p.m. CST	Ashley Roni 7' (pen.), 67'; Melina Rebimbas 11', 25'; Larkin Thomason 12', 58'; Leah Klurman 13' (pen.); Paige Thompson (yellow card) 24'; Reece Ward 30'; Kennedy Garcia 35'; Soph Martelli 41'; Trinity Daudu Ihayere 79'; Madi Munguia (yellow card) 80'; Ulla Sharp 84'	Report	(yellow card) 13' Ryanne Hawthorn-Harper; (yellow card) 17' Elon Sheffield; (yellow card) 23', (red card) 29' Sarah Portis	Stadium: Alabama Soccer Stadium; Attendance: 817; Referee: Kylie Rhodes; Assistant referees: Logan Reeves, Ethan Wilson; Fourth official: Celeste Roberts

November 20	(5) Stanford	2–1	Santa Clara	Stanford, CA
6:00 p.m. PST	Ella Kral 29'; Charlotte Kohler 75' (pen.)	Report	(yellow card) 56' Kennedy Schoennauer; (yellow card) 75' Ally Harrison; 89' Izzy DeBuyl	Stadium: Maloney Field at Laird Q. Cagan Stadium; Attendance: 1,455; Referee: Iryna Petrunok; Assistant referees: Cecilia Chavez, Jessica Peralta; Fourth official: Krystin Pahia

November 21	(3) Duke	3–1	UNC Wilmington	Durham, NC
2:00 p.m. EST	Mia Minestrella 11' (pen.), 63'; Jocelyn Travers 27'; Natalie Chudowsky (yellow card) 77'	Report	(yellow card) 64' Rachel Fry; 71' Ava Vaughan	Stadium: Koskinen Stadium; Attendance: 1,814; Referee: MJ Tehini; Assistant referees: Josiah Parke, Ben Ellis; Fourth official: Clive Edwards

November 21	(1) North Carolina	5–0	UNC Asheville	Chapel Hill, NC
6:00 p.m. EST	Izzi Stratton 40'; Bella Devey 59'; Ashley Pennie 66'; Deus Stanislaus 70'; Summer Denigan 76'	Report	(yellow card) 67' Georgia Duke; (yellow card) 88' Lili Adams	Stadium: Dorrance Field; Attendance: 4,470; Referee: Kevin Uitto; Assistant referees: Adonis Alawar, Marcus Moss; Fourth official: Aaron Hormuth

===== Second round =====
November 27	(3) Duke	v	(6) Michigan	Charlottesville, VA
2:00 pm EST				Stadium: Klöckner Stadium

November 27	(4) Alabama	v	(5) Stanford	Chapel Hill, NC
2:30 pm EST				Stadium: Dorrance Field

November 27	(1) North Carolina	v	Washington	Chapel Hill, NC
6:00 pm EST				Stadium: Dorrance Field

November 27	(2) Virginia	v	(7) West Virginia	Charlottesville, VA
6:00 pm EST				Stadium: Klöckner Stadium

===== Round of 16 =====
v

v

===== Quarterfinals =====
v

Rankings shown are seeds in this bracket of the tournament.

=== Ohio State bracket ===
First round Campus Sites
2	Wake Forest*	4
Boston University	1
Saint Louis	3
7	Arkansas*	0
6	Penn State*	0
Villanova (a.e.t.)	1
Abilene Christian	0
3	Texas Tech*	2
4	Purdue*	4
Southern Illinois	0
Houston (a.e.t.)	4
5	Texas*	3
8	Tennessee*	3
Liberty	2
Lipscomb	1
1	Ohio State*	4

Second round Regional Campus Sites
2	Wake Forest
Saint Louis
Villanova
3	Texas Tech*
4	Purdue
Houston
8	Tennessee
1	Ohio State

Round of 16; Regional Campus Sites

Quarterfinal; Campus Sites

* Host institution

==== Schedule ====
===== First round =====
November 20	(4) Purdue	4–0	Southern Illinois	West Lafayette, IN
2:00 p.m. EST	McKenzie Carle 18'; Tanna Schornstein 26'; Irene Campo 52', 67'	Report		Stadium: Folk Field; Attendance: 1,660; Referee: Alex Hoffstetter; Assistant referees: Shane Foley, Maxwell Unger; Fourth official: Benjamin Trevino

November 20	(6) Penn State	0–1 (a.e.t.)	Villanova	University Park, PA
6:00 p.m. EST		Report	99' Kaydee Amorosa	Stadium: Jeffrey Field; Attendance: 1,597; Referee: Marie Durr; Assistant referees: Taylor Heemstra, Taylor Bombalski; Fourth official: Sarah Siegel

November 20	(1) Ohio State	4–1	Lipscomb	Columbus, OH
6:00 p.m. EST	Anika Poremba 1'; Amanda Schlueter 11', 81'; Mia Stevens 34'	Report	71' Haylee Dean	Stadium: Jesse Owens Memorial Stadium; Attendance: 1,325; Referee: Nicole Green; Assistant referees: Aaron Rawlings, Aaron Fong; Fourth official: Jeffery Mellen

November 20	(8) Tennessee	3–2	Liberty	Knoxville, TN
6:00 p.m. EST	Ines Derrien 1' (pen.), 26'; Shae O'Rourke (yellow card) 28'; Olivia Feagin 43'	Report	6', (yellow card) 31' Sallie Garner; 71' Halle Engle	Stadium: Regal Soccer Stadium; Attendance: 653; Referee: Aaron Hernandez; Assistant referees: Eric Usher, Lauren Gray; Fourth official: Lucy Bell

November 20	(5) Texas	3–4 (a.e.t.)	Houston	Austin, TX
6:00 p.m. CST	Caroline Swann 12', 71'; Audrey Bryant 18'; Ava McDonald (yellow card) 30'; Sadie Hoch (yellow card) 72'	Report	26' Morgan Donohue; (yellow card) 30', (goal) 53' Ella Morgan; (yellow card) 30' Team; 48', 98' Samira Minor	Stadium: Mike A. Myers Stadium; Attendance: 1,715; Referee: Travis Haight; Assistant referees: Ryan Lindskog, Xiana Pang-Abas; Fourth official: Bryan Parra

November 20	(3) Texas Tech	2–0	Abilene Christian	Lubbock, TX
6:00 p.m. CST	Taylor Zdrojewski 21'; Raleigh Greason 67'	Report	(red card) 82' Emma Taylor	Stadium: John Walker Soccer Complex; Attendance: 1,210; Referee: Habeeb Hooshmand; Assistant referees: Fevzi Demirhan, Guillermo Zenteno; Fourth official: Jacob Cohen

November 21	(2) Wake Forest	4–1	Boston University	Winston-Salem, NC
6:00 p.m. EST	Henley Tippins 18', 53'; Kylie Maxwell 25'; Riley Cross 54'	Report	10' Kat Slott	Stadium: Spry Stadium; Attendance: 420; Referee: John Matto; Assistant referees: Justin Howard, Elon Dockery; Fourth official: William Steffen

November 21	(7) Arkansas	0–3	Saint Louis	Fayetteville, AR
6:00 p.m. CST	Natalie Wagner (yellow card) 11'; Aniyah Nurse-Whyte (yellow card) 58', (yellow card) 60'	hhttps://slubillikens.com/sports/womens-soccer/stats/2026/arkansas/boxscore/18955	35' Audrey Smith; 58' Caroline Chier; 82' Adee Broesder	Stadium: Razorback Field; Attendance: 1,121; Referee: Brandon Gardner; Assistant referees: Jay Norris, Eric Guzman; Fourth official: Yophiyyah Fish

===== Second round =====
November 27	(3) Texas Tech	v	Villanova	Winston-Salem, NC
2:00 pm EST				Stadium: Spry Stadium

November 27	(4) Purdue	v	Houston	Columbus, OH
3:00 pm EST				Stadium: Jesse Owens Memorial Stadium

November 27	(2) Wake Forest	v	Saint Louis	Winston-Salem, NC
6:00 pm EST				Stadium: Spry Stadium

November 27	(1) Ohio State	v	(8) Tennessee	Columbus, OH
6:00 pm EST				Stadium: Jesse Owens Memorial Stadium

===== Round of 16 =====
v

v

===== Quarterfinals =====
v

Rankings shown are seeds in this bracket of the tournament.

=== Vanderbilt bracket ===
First round Campus Sites
1	Vanderbilt*	5
UT Martin	0
Wisconsin	2
8	Louisville*	1
5	Florida State*	4
UCF	1
UAB	0
4	South Carolina*	2
3	Colorado*	3
Air Force	0
Brown	0 (6)
6	Clemson* (pen.)	0 (7)
7	Kentucky*	1
Virginia Tech	3
Lamar	0
2	Baylor*	3

Second round Regional Campus Sites
1	Vanderbilt
Wisconsin
5	Florida State
4	South Carolina
3	Colorado
6	Clemson
Virginia Tech
2	Baylor

Round of 16; Regional Campus Sites

Quarterfinal; Campus Sites

* Host institution

==== Schedule ====
===== First round =====
November 20	(5) Florida State	4–1	UCF	Tallahassee, FL
5:00 p.m. EST	Nyanya Touray 70'; Peyton McGovern (yellow card) 73'; Wrianna Hudson 87', 88'; Shaneil Buckley 88'	Report	38' Naomi Clark; (yellow card) 72' Ella Holloran	Stadium: Seminole Soccer Complex; Attendance: 1,001; Referee: Mario Maric; Assistant referees: Robert Benge, Lorenzo Lopez; Fourth official: Jake Joyce

November 20	(8) Louisville	1–2	Wisconsin	Louisville, KY
6:00 p.m. EST	Amelia Swinarski 4'; Kiley Peat (yellow card) 34'; Norah Roush (yellow card) 70'	Report	(yellow card) 66' Team; 75' Anya Gulbrandsen; 86' Hailey Baumann	Stadium: Lynn Stadium; Attendance: 568; Referee: Kevin Fikar; Assistant referees: Noah Matos, Josh Braunstein; Fourth official: George Perry IV

November 20	(4) South Carolina	2–0	UAB	Columbia, SC
6:00 p.m. EST	Cuyler Zulauf 19'; Ava Tutas 36'	Report	(yellow card) 72' Abby Graeser; (yellow card) 75' Maia Sirota	Stadium: Stone Stadium; Attendance: 870; Referee: Kayla Polonsky; Assistant referees: Amy Balbier, Paige Bell; Fourth official: Benjamin Oakley

November 20	(1) Vanderbilt	5–0	UT Martin	Nashville, TN
6:00 p.m. CST	Courtney Jones 33'; Sydney Watts 34'; Megan Hinnenkamp 49'; Hailey Perkins 78'; Mia Hebert 82'	Report		Stadium: Vanderbilt Soccer Complex; Attendance: 865; Referee: Lila Remache; Assistant referees: Tyler Bost, Nicole Steiner; Fourth official: Wes Couette

November 20	(7) Kentucky	1–3	Virginia Tech	Lexington, KY
7:30 p.m. EST	Teagan Myers (yellow card) 9'; Team (yellow card) 16'; Kendall Campbell (yellow card) 56'; Alexis Tylenda 63'; Nadia Ramadan (yellow card) 90'	Report	3', 59' Anna Weir; 16' Eliana Salama; (yellow card) 36' Hannah Pachan; (yellow card) 40' Syri Davis; (yellow card) 65' Celine Kampmann	Stadium: The Bell; Attendance: 650; Referee: John Kennedy; Assistant referees: Maggie Short, Laura Snyder; Fourth official: Chad Collins

November 20	(2) Baylor	3–0	Lamar	Waco, TX
7:00 p.m. CST	Lauren Omholt 2'; Brynnlee Bohannon 27'; Aryanna Jimison 88'	Report	(yellow card) 86' Marissa Gross	Stadium: Betty Lou Mays Soccer Field; Attendance: 967; Referee: Daniel Radford; Assistant referees: Aaron Donahoe, Justin Werst; Fourth official: Aldair Sanchez Alvarado

November 20	(3) Colorado	3–0	Air Force	Boulder, CO
7:00 p.m. MST	Team 11' (o.g.); Hope Leyba 26'; Reagan Kotschau 89'	Report		Stadium: Prentup Field; Attendance: 2,081; Referee: Lukasz Jozefecki; Assistant referees: Bowen Taylor, Charles Rupert; Fourth official: Brian Yip

November 21, 2026	(6) Clemson	0–0 (a.e.t.) (7–6 p)	Brown	Clemson, SC
5:00 p.m. EST	Juju Harris (yellow card) 81'	Report	(yellow card) 49' Audrey Lam; (yellow card) 59' Team; (yellow card) 60' Angelina Vargas; (yellow card) 91' Kyra Treanor; (yellow card) 98' Joy Okonye	Stadium: Riggs Field; Attendance: 628; Referee: Kyle Johnston; Assistant referees: Robert Leonard, Wilmer Soriano; Fourth official: Daniel Benson
	Penalties
	Juju Harris (penalty missed); Taylor Leib (penalty scored); Anna Castenfelt (penalty scored); Carla Small (penalty scored); Gabby Hoschek (penalty scored); Tatum Short (penalty scored); Kendall Bodak (penalty scored); Christian Brathwaite (penalty scored)		(penalty scored) Joy Okonye; (penalty scored) Ella Weil; (penalty scored) Jael-Marie Guy; (penalty scored) Nadja Meite; (penalty missed) Hannah Schapiro; (penalty scored) Brooke Birtwistle; (penalty scored) Audrey Lam; (penalty missed) Corine Gregory

===== Second round =====
November 27	(4) South Carolina	v	(5) Florida State	Nashville, TN
3:00 p.m. EST				Stadium: Vanderbilt Soccer Complex

November 27	(3) Colorado	v	(6) Clemson	Waco, TX
5:00 p.m. EST				Stadium: Betty Lou Mays Soccer Field

November 27	(1) Vanderbilt	v	Wisconsin	Nashville, TN
6:00 p.m. EST				Stadium: Vanderbilt Soccer Complex

November 27	(2) Baylor	v	Virginia Tech	Waco, TX
8:00 p.m. EST				Stadium: Betty Lou Mays Soccer Field

===== Round of 16 =====
v

v

===== Quarterfinals =====
v

Rankings shown are seeds in this bracket of the tournament.

=== Michigan State bracket ===
First round Campus Sites
2	Notre Dame*	4
Milwaukee	0
Samford	0
7	Mississippi State*	2
6	Utah State*	3
Utah Valley	2
Weber State	3
3	BYU*	4
4	Kansas* (a.e.t.)	3
Oral Roberts	2
Quinnipiac	0
5	UCLA*	4
8	Xavier*	3
Oklahoma	2
Central Connecticut	0
1	Michigan State*	7

Second round Regional Campus Sites
2	Notre Dame
7	Mississippi State
6	Utah State
3	BYU
4	Kansas
5	UCLA
8	Xavier
1	Michigan State

Round of 16; Regional Campus Sites

Quarterfinal; Campus Sites

* Host institution

==== Schedule ====
===== First round =====
November 20	(2) Notre Dame	4–0	Milwaukee	Notre Dame, IN
6:00 p.m. EST	Bristol Kersh 12'; Morgan Roy 23'; Izzy Engle 24', 69'; Gracie Milam (yellow card) 59'	Report	(yellow card) 59' Ashlyn Skinner-Barrett	Stadium: Alumni Stadium; Attendance: 1,473; Referee: Cesar Ibarra

November 20	(4) Kansas	3–2 (a.e.t.)	Oral Roberts	Lawrence, KS
5:30 p.m. CST	Jillian Gregorski 18', 100'; Jocelyn Herrema 35'	Report	55', 57' Layney Molini; (yellow card) 91' Precious Edosa	Stadium: Rock Chalk Park; Attendance: 1,726; Referee: Braeden Frey; Assistant referees: Brendan Sweetman, Toyosi Ishola; Fourth official: Esad Omanovic

November 20	(7) Mississippi State	2–0	Samford	Mississippi State, MS
6:00 p.m. CST	Chiara Tappe 2', 10'; Kara Harris (yellow card) 87'	Report	(yellow card) 83' Lucy Corley	Stadium: MSU Soccer Field; Attendance: 1,236; Referee: Melinda Homa; Assistant referees: Eduardo Rocha, Sloan Miller; Fourth official: Laith Dahhan

November 20	(3) BYU	4–3	Weber State	Provo, UT
6:00 p.m. MST	Mika Krommenhoek 2'; Mattyn Summers-Oviatt 11'; Mia Goettsche 22', 90'; Bella Woods (yellow card) 77'; Lucy Kesler (yellow card) 89'	Report	(yellow card) 18' Team; 45' Cloe Baugh; 52' (pen.), (yellow card) 83' Simone Packer; 66' Lily Blum	Stadium: South Field; Attendance: 2,651; Referee: Nathan Boone; Assistant referees: Taylor Poulsen, Kyler Baker; Fourth official: Chris Park

November 20	(6) Utah State	3–2	Utah Valley	Logan, UT
6:00 p.m. MST	Kunie Hirai 4', 81'; Hadli Barrera 82'; Austin Miller (yellow card) 90'	Report	13' Isabella Stewart; 61' (o.g.) Team; (yellow card) 74' Team; (yellow card) 74' Team	Stadium: Bell Soccer Field; Attendance: 1,283; Referee: Aliya Kahn

November 21	(1) Michigan State	7–0	Central Connecticut	East Lansing, MI
3:30 p.m. EST	Bella Najera 14', 25'; Kennedy Bell 17' (pen.), 66'; Lacey Kindel 44'; LJ Pearcy 80', 82'	Report		Stadium: DeMartin Stadium; Attendance: 1,980; Referee: Eulogio Villalpando; Assistant referees: Shane Richards, Jason Cross; Fourth official: Khalaf Al-Latayfeh Malkawi

November 21	(8) Xavier	3–2	Oklahoma	Cincinnati, OH
6:30 p.m. EST	Maria Tapia 1', 76'; Regan Dancer 13'; Team (yellow card) 24'	Report	16', 64', (yellow card) 82' Kayla Keefer	Stadium: Corcoran Field; Attendance: 1,282; Referee: Eric Tattersall; Assistant referees: Sean West, Shawn Westerfield; Fourth official: Emily Fakhry

November 21	(5) UCLA	4–0	Quinnipiac	Los Angeles, CA
7:00 p.m. PST	Oruha Hayashi 55'; Mia Corona 58'; Olivia Woodson 69'; Cate Sarinopoulos 89'	Report	(yellow card) 77' Stella Tosoni	Stadium: Wallis Annenberg Stadium; Attendance: 622; Referee: Amber O'Conno; Assistant referees: Maria Magana, Ana Valdez; Fourth official: Blanca Diaz-Rodriguez

===== Second round =====
November 27	(4) Kansas	v	(5) UCLA	East Lansing, MI
3:00 p.m. EST				Stadium: DeMartin Stadium

November 27	(3) BYU	v	(6) Utah State	Notre Dame, IN
3:00 p.m. EST				Stadium: Alumni Stadium

November 27	(1) Michigan State	v	(8) Xavier	East Lansing, MI
6:00 p.m. EST				Stadium: DeMartin Stadium

November 27	(2) Notre Dame	v	(7) Mississippi	Notre Dame, IN
6:00 p.m. EST				Stadium: Alumni Stadium

===== Round of 16 =====
v

v

===== Quarterfinals =====
v

Rankings shown are seeds in this bracket of the tournament.

=== College Cup ===
Semifinals; December 5 First Horizon Stadium; Cary, North Carolina

Final; December 8 First Horizon Stadium; Cary, North Carolina

==== Schedule ====
===== Semi-finals =====
December 10	v	Cary, NC
6:00 PM EST		Stadium: First Horizon Stadium

December 10	v	Cary, NC
8:30 PM EST		Stadium: First Horizon Stadium

===== Final =====
December 13	v	Cary, NC
7:00 PM EST		Stadium: First Horizon Stadium

Rankings from United Soccer Coaches Final Regular Season Rankings

== Record by conference ==
Conference	Bids	Record	Pct.	R32	R16	E8	F4	CG	NC
Big East	2	2–0	1.000	2					
Pac-12	1	1–0	1.000	1					
Atlantic 10	1	1–0	1.000	1					
Big 12	8	7–1	.875	7					
ACC	10	8–1–1	.850	9					
Big Ten	8	6–1–1	.813	7					
SEC	10	5–4–1	.550	5					
Other	24	0–23–1	.021	0					

- The R32, S16, E8, F4, CG, and NC columns indicate how many teams from each conference were in the Round of 32 (second round), Round of 16 (third round), Quarterfinals (Elite Eight), Semi-finals (Final Four), Championship Game, and National Champion, respectively.
- The following conferences received one bid and failed to place a team into the round of 32: American East, American, ASUN, Big Sky, Big South, Big West, CAA, C-USA, Horizon, Ivy, MAAC, MAC, Missouri Valley, Mountain West, Northeast, Ohio Valley, Patriot, SoCon, Southland, SWAC, Summit League, Sun Belt, UAC, West Coast. These conference's records have been consolidated in the "Other" row.

== Statistics ==
=== Goalscorers ===
There have been 127 goals scored in 32 matches, for an average of 3.97 goals per match (as of November 21, 2026). Players highlighted in bold are still active in the competition.

2 goals

- **(United States) Melina Rebimbas – Alabama**
- **(United States) Ashley Roni – Alabama**
- **(United States) Larkin Thomason – Alabama**
- **(United States) Mia Goettsche – BYU**
- **(United States) Mia Minestrella – Duke**
- **(United States) Wrianna Hudson – Florida State**
- **(United States) Samira Minor – Houston**
- **(United States) Jillian Gregorski – Kansas**
- **(United States) Kennedy Bell – Michigan State**
- **(United States) Bella Najera – Michigan State**
- **(United States) LJ Pearcy – Michigan State**
- **(Germany) Chiara Tappe – Mississippi State**
- **(United States) Izzy Engle – Notre Dame**
- **(United States) Amanda Schlueter – Ohio State**
- (United States) Kayla Keefer – Oklahoma
- (United States) Layney Molini – Oral Roberts
- **(Spain) Irene Campo – Purdue**
- **(United States) Ines Derrien – Tennessee**
- (United States) Caroline Swann – Texas
- **(United States) Kunie Hirai – Utah State**
- **(United States) Anna Weir – Virginia Tech**
- **(United States) Henley Tippins – Wake Forest**
- **(United States) Maria Tapia – Xavier**

1 goal

- **(France) Trinity Daudu Ihayere – Alabama**
- **(United States) Kennedy Garcia – Alabama**
- **(United States) Leah Klurman – Alabama**
- **(United States) Soph Martelli – Alabama**
- **(United States) Ulla Sharp – Alabama**
- **(United States) Reece Ward – Alabama**
- **(United States) Brynnlee Bohannon – Baylor**
- **(United States) Aryanna Jimison – Baylor**
- **(United States) Lauren Omholt – Baylor**
- (United States) Kat Slott – Boston University
- **(United States) Mika Krommenhoek – BYU**
- **(United States) Mattyn Summers-Oviatt – BYU**
- **(United States) Reagan Kotschau – Colorado**
- **(United States) Hope Leyba – Colorado**
- **(United States) Jocelyn Travers – Duke**
- **(Jamaica) Shaneil Buckley – Florida State**
- **(United States) Nyanya Touray – Florida State**
- **(United States) Morgan Donohue – Houston**
- **(United States) Ella Morgan – Houston**
- **(United States) Jocelyn Herrema – Kansas**
- (United States) Alexis Tylenda – Kentucky
- (United States) Halle Engle – Liberty
- (United States) Sallie Garner – Liberty
- (United States) Haylee Dean – Lipscomb
- (United States) Amelia Swinarski – Louisville
- **(United States) Elle Ervin – Michigan**
- **(United States) Beanie Harshe – Michigan**
- **(Canada) Lacey Kindel – Michigan State**
- **(United States) Summer Denigan – North Carolina**
- **(United States) Bella Devey – North Carolina**
- **(United States) Ashley Pennie – North Carolina**
- **(United States) Deus Stanislaus – North Carolina**
- **(United States) Izzi Stratton – North Carolina**
- **(United States) Anika Poremba – Ohio State**
- **(United States) Mia Stevens – Ohio State**
- **(United States) Bristol Kersh – Notre Dame**
- **(United States) Morgan Roy – Notre Dame**
- **(United States) McKenzie Carle – Purdue**
- **(United States) Tanna Schornstein – Purdue**
- **(United States) Audrey Smith – Saint Louis**
- **(United States) Caroline Chier – Saint Louis**
- **(United States) Adee Broesder – Saint Louis**
- (United States) Izzy DeBuyl – Santa Clara
- **(United States) Ava Tutas – South Carolina**
- **(United States) Cuyler Zulauf – South Carolina**
- **(United States) Charlotte Kohler – Stanford**
- **(United States) Ella Kral – Stanford**
- **(United States) Olivia Feagin – Tennessee**
- (United States) Audrey Bryant – Texas
- **(United States) Raleigh Greason – Texas Tech**
- **(United States) Taylor Zdrojewski – Texas Tech**
- (United States) Naomi Clark – UCF
- **(United States) Mia Corona – UCLA**
- **(Japan) Oruha Hayashi – UCLA**
- **(United States) Cate Sarinopoulos – UCLA**
- **(United States) Olivia Woodson – UCLA**
- (United States) Ava Vaughan – UNC Wilmington
- **(United States) Hadli Barrera – Utah State**
- (United States) Isabella Stewart – Utah Valley
- **(United States) Mia Hebert – Vanderbilt**
- **(United States) Megan Hinnenkamp – Vanderbilt**
- **(United States) Courtney Jones – Vanderbilt**
- **(United States) Hailey Perkins – Vanderbilt**
- **(United States) Sydney Watts – Vanderbilt**
- **(United States) Kaydee Amorosa – Villanova**
- **(United States) Faith Broering – Virginia**
- **(Brazil) Giovana Canali – Virginia**
- **(United States) Kathryn Kelly – Virginia**
- **(Netherlands) Olivia Rademaker – Virginia**
- **(United States) Eliana Salama – Virginia Tech**
- **(United States) Riley Cross – Wake Forest**
- **(United States) Kylie Maxwell – Wake Forest**
- (United States) Cloe Baugh – Weber State
- (United States) Lily Blum – Weber State
- (United States) Simone Packer – Weber State
- **(United States) Abbey Olexa – West Virginia**
- **(United States) Hailey Baumann – Wisconsin**
- **(United States) Anya Gulbrandsen – Wisconsin**
- **(United States) Regan Dancer – Xavier**

1 own goal

- Air Force (against Colorado)
- Utah State (against Utah Valley)

== See also ==
- 2026 NCAA Division I men's soccer tournament
