= Reagan Kotschau =

American soccer player (born 2005)

Personal information
- Date of birth: March 19, 2005 (age 21)
- Height: 5 ft 5 in (1.65 m)
- Position: Midfielder

Team information
- Current team: Colorado Buffaloes
- Number: 33

Youth career
- Real Colorado
- 2021–2023: Broomfield Eagles

College career
Years	Team	Apps	(Gls)
2023–2024	Washington State Cougars	38	(5)
2025–	Colorado Buffaloes	43	(10)

Reagan Kotschau (born March 19, 2005) is an American college soccer player who plays as a midfielder for the Colorado Buffaloes. She previously played for the Washington State Cougars. She was named Big 12 Midfielder of the Year with the Buffaloes in 2026.

== Early life ==
Kotschau grew up in Thornton, Colorado. She began playing soccer at age three. She had a decorated high school career at Broomfield High School, leading the team to the CHSAA 5A state championship as a sophomore in 2021, before finishing as state runner-up in 2022. She was named United Soccer Coaches All-American, first-team all-state three times, and the Daily Camera Player of the Year in 2023. She was also a standout club performer for Real Colorado, leading the team to the ECNL U17 national championship and being named the ECNL U17 National Player of the Year in 2022, among multiple ECNL All-American honors. She committed to play college soccer for the Washington State Cougars during her junior year.

== College career ==
Kotschau started all 19 games for the Washington State Cougars as a freshman in 2023, scoring 4 goals and adding 2 assists, and was named to the Pac-12 Conference all-freshman team. With the program's move to the West Coast Conference, she started all 19 games and recorded 1 goal and 6 assists as a sophomore in 2024. After two seasons at Washington State, she transferred to the University of Colorado Boulder in her home state. She had a strong debut season with the Colorado Buffaloes, starting all 24 games, scoring 7 goals, and tallying 6 assists in 2025. She helped the Buffaloes set multiple program records including most wins and reach the NCAA tournament third round, scoring a golden goal in their tournament opener. She was named Big 12 Midfielder of the Year following her senior season in 2026.

== Personal life ==
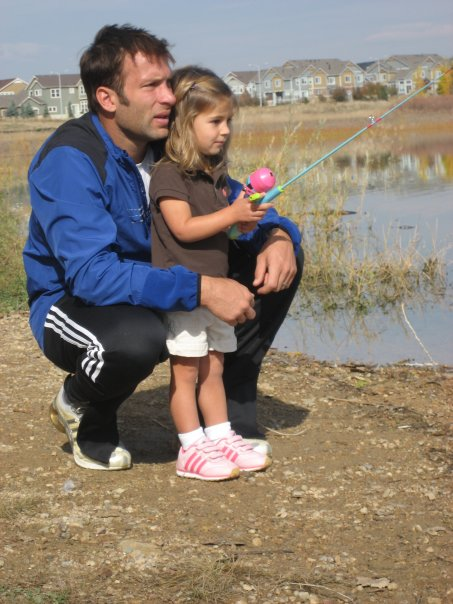
Kotschau and her father, 2011

Kotschau is the daughter of Meredith and Ritchie Kotschau, both of whom played college soccer for the George Mason Patriots. Her father played in Major League Soccer (MLS) for ten seasons. Her younger sister, Marin, also plays soccer.

== Honors and awards ==
Individual

- Big 12 Midfielder of the Year: 2026
- First-team All-Big 12: 2026
- Pac-12 all-freshman team: 2023
