= Satara Murray =

Jamaican footballer (born 1993)

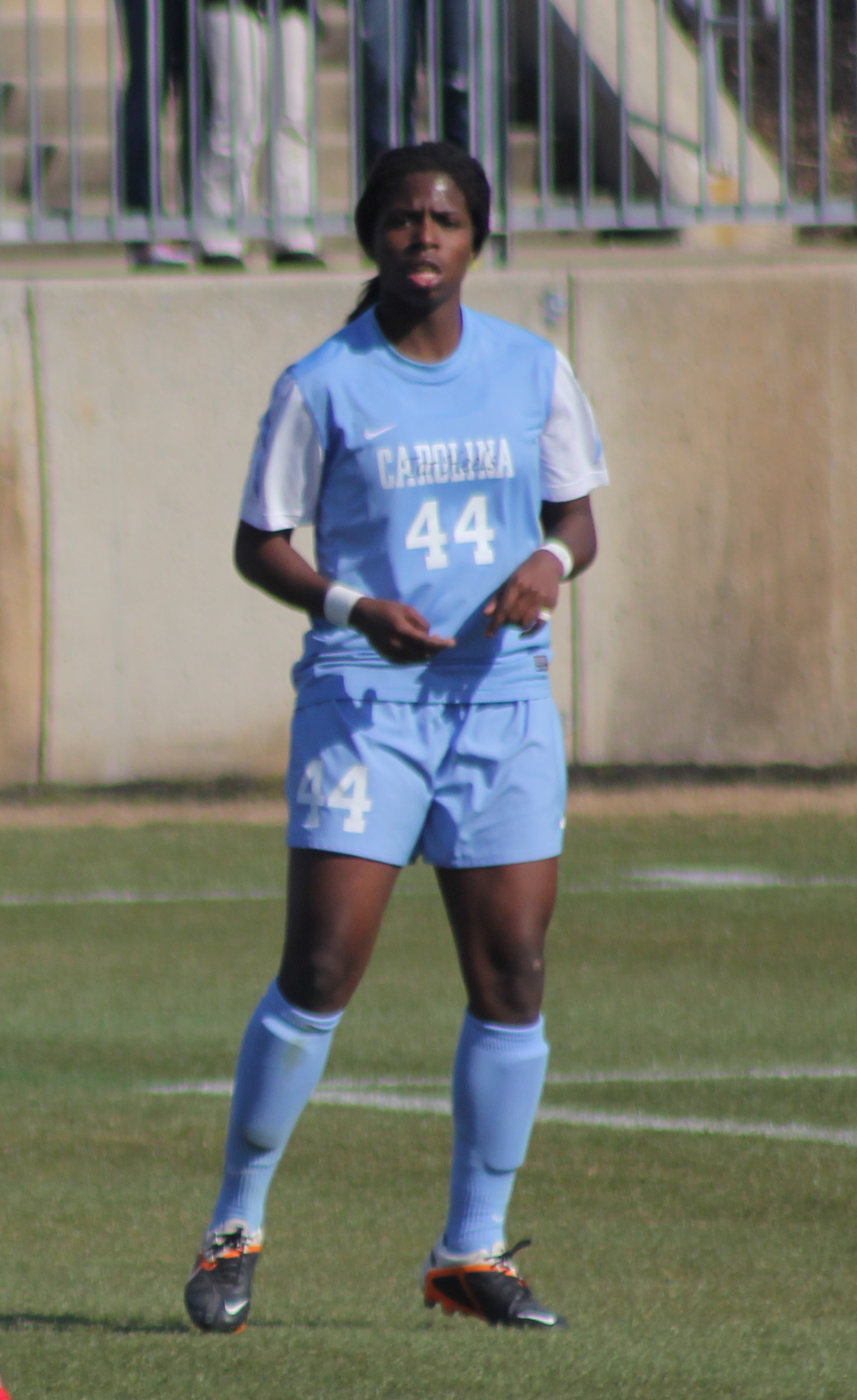
- Murray in 2013

Personal information
- Full name: Satara Melonie Murray
- Date of birth: 1 July 1993 (age 33)
- Place of birth: Brooklyn, United States
- Height: 1.73 m (5 ft 8 in)
- Position: Defender

Team information
- Current team: Sheffield United
- Number: 44

Youth career
- Lonestar '93
- 2013: Pali Blues
- 2014: Washington Spirit Reserves

College career
Years	Team	Apps	(Gls)
2011–2014	North Carolina Tar Heels	85	(1)

Senior career*
Years	Team	Apps	(Gls)
2015–2019	Liverpool	66	(2)
2019	Houston Dash	9	(0)
2020	Kolbotn	5	(0)
2021	FC Austin Elite		
2021–2022	Bristol City	22	(0)
2022–2023	Racing Louisville	9	(0)
2023–2024	Bristol City	4	(0)
2024–2025	Sheffield United	10	(0)

International career^{‡}
2021–2023	Jamaica	5	(0)
Medal record
Representing Jamaica
CONCACAF W Championship
Third place	2022 Mexico
- * Club domestic league appearances and goals as of 13 February 2026 ‡ National team caps and goals as of 13 February 2026

Satara Melonie Murray (born 1 July 1993) is a former professional footballer who played as a defender. Murray previously played for English clubs Liverpool, Bristol City, and Sheffield United; Racing Louisville and Houston Dash of the NWSL, and Kolbotn Fotball of the Norwegian Toppserien. Born in the United States, she represented Jamaica internationally.

Born in New York and raised in Texas, Murray won a collegiate national championship with North Carolina Tar Heels before starting her professional career in 2015 with Liverpool of the FA Women's Super League. She spent four years with Liverpool before joining Houston Dash on a free transfer.

== Collegiate career ==
Murray had a stellar collegiate career, appearing 85 times for the North Carolina Tar Heels. She was instrumental in helping UNC win its 21st national championship in 2012. For her effort, she was twice named an All-American as well as the most outstanding defensive player at the 2012 NCAA College Cup.

== Professional career ==
=== Liverpool ===
Murray signed with two-time defending FA WSL champion Liverpool in 2015. While at the club she made 68 appearances at centre-back and right-back, scoring two goals.

=== Houston Dash ===
Murray was recruited through the NWSL Discovery Process by the Houston Dash ahead of their 2019 season. A native from Austin she expressed excitement at playing in her home state.

=== Kolbotn ===
On 29 July 2020, Murray was announced at Kolbotn on a contract that lasts until the end of the season, with the option of an extension until 2021.

=== First spell at Bristol City ===
On 28 July 2021, Murray was announced at Bristol City.

=== Racing Louisville ===
On 16 May 2022, Murray was announced at Racing Louisville.

=== Second spell at Bristol City ===
On 26 July 2023, Murray rejoined Bristol City on a two-year contract. On 5 August 2024, Murray left Bristol City.

=== Sheffield United ===
On 21 August 2024, Murray was announced at Sheffield United. On 7 September 2024, she was announced as the new club captain of the club. In May 2025, Murray announced that she would retire from playing professionally at the end of the 2024-25 season.

== International career ==
Born in the United States, Murray was also eligible to represent England through her mother (who was born in London), Jamaica through her paternal family, Antigua and Barbuda through her maternal grandfather or Guyana through her maternal grandmother.

In 2010, Guyana named Murray to its provisional squad for the Gold Cup. Despite Guyana head coach Mark Rodrigues' excitement over her inclusion at the time, Murray ultimately did not play for Guyana.

Following her move to Liverpool and after not receiving international call-ups by the United States, Murray was called up to the England U23 team for two training camps in 2016.

On 24 October 2021, Murray made her senior international debut for Jamaica.
