= Kayla Keefer =

American soccer player (born 2005)

Personal information
- Full name: Kayla Nicole Keefer
- Date of birth: May 6, 2005 (age 21)
- Height: 5 ft 6 in (1.68 m)
- Position: Forward

Team information
- Current team: Oklahoma Sooners
- Number: 6

Youth career
- STN Elite
- 2020–2023: Central Columbia Blue Jays

College career
Years	Team	Apps	(Gls)
2024	Ole Miss Rebels	16	(5)
2025–	Oklahoma Sooners	36	(27)

Senior career*
Years	Team	Apps	(Gls)
2023–2024	Lancaster Inferno	–	(14)
2025	Eagle FC	3	(3)
- * Club domestic league appearances and goals

Kayla Nicole Keefer (born May 6, 2005) is an American college soccer player who plays as a forward for the Oklahoma Sooners. She previously played for the Ole Miss Rebels.

== Early life ==
Keefer grew up in Bloomsburg, Pennsylvania, where she attended Central Columbia High School. She scored 140 goals over three seasons at Central Columbia, winning two consecutive PIAA Class AA state championships. She played club soccer for STN Elite. She also played for Lancaster Inferno in United Women's Soccer (UWS) and was named the UWS Young Player of the Year in 2023. She committed to play college soccer for the Ole Miss Rebels under head coach Matt Mott, though the coach had been succeeded by Molly Rouse by the time she got to campus.

== College career ==
Keefer led the Ole Miss Rebels with 5 goals in 16 appearances as a freshman in 2024, including a hat trick in her college debut. She then transferred to play for the Oklahoma Sooners under Matt Mott, reuniting with the coach who initially recruited her to Ole Miss. During her first year at Oklahoma, she started all 18 games and led the Sooners in points with 7 goals and 8 assists. She then enjoyed a breakout junior season in 2026, becoming the first Sooner to score 20 goals in a season and the first to earn first-team All-SEC honors.

== Honors and awards ==
Individual

- First-team All-SEC: 2026
- UWS Young Player of the Year: 2023
