= 2026 Big Ten women's soccer tournament =

Postseason women's soccer tournament

- Classification: Division I
- Teams: 8
- Matches: 7
- Quarterfinals site: Energizer Park; St. Louis, Missouri
- Semifinals site: Energizer Park; St. Louis, Missouri
- Finals site: Folk Field; West Lafayette, Indiana
- Champions: Purdue (2nd title)
- Winning coach: Richard Moodie (1st title)
- MVP: Irene Campo (Purdue)
- Broadcast: BTN, B1G+

2026 Big Ten Conference women's soccer standings
	Conf.						Overall
Team	W		L		T	PCT	W		L		T	PCT
No. 3 Ohio State ‍‍‍	10	–	1	–	0	.909	14	–	1	–	1	.906
No. 18 Purdue ‍‍‍	8	–	2	–	1	.773	14	–	2	–	2	.833
No. 14 UCLA ‍‍‍	8	–	2	–	1	.773	11	–	4	–	2	.706
No. t-6 Michigan St ‍‍‍	8	–	3	–	0	.727	12	–	3	–	2	.765
No. 23 Penn St ‍‍‍	6	–	2	–	3	.682	8	–	3	–	5	.656
No. 21 Washington ‍‍‍	6	–	2	–	3	.682	11	–	2	–	4	.765
Wisconsin ‍‍‍	6	–	3	–	2	.636	10	–	4	–	3	.676
Michigan ‍‍‍	5	–	4	–	2	.545	7	–	4	–	5	.594
Iowa ‍‍‍	4	–	3	–	4	.545	9	–	4	–	5	.639
Minnesota ‍‍‍	4	–	5	–	2	.455	8	–	6	–	3	.559
Rutgers ‍‍‍	4	–	6	–	1	.409	5	–	7	–	4	.438
Illinois ‍‍‍	2	–	5	–	4	.364	5	–	5	–	7	.500
Nebraska ‍‍‍	1	–	3	–	7	.409	3	–	4	–	10	.471
Northwestern ‍‍‍	3	–	7	–	1	.318	5	–	10	–	3	.361
USC ‍‍‍	1	–	6	–	4	.273	2	–	9	–	6	.294
Maryland ‍‍‍	1	–	8	–	2	.182	4	–	10	–	3	.324
Oregon ‍‍‍	1	–	8	–	2	.182	6	–	8	–	3	.441
Indiana ‍‍‍	1	–	9	–	1	.136	4	–	11	–	2	.294
† – Conference champion ‡ – 2026 Big Ten Tournament champion y – Invited to the NCAA Tournament; As of October 29, 2026; Rankings from United Soccer Coaches Poll; Source:Big Ten

The 2026 Big Ten women's soccer tournament was the postseason women's soccer tournament for the Big Ten Conference held from November 4 through 13, 2026. The tournament was hosted by Energizer Park in St. Louis, Missouri for the Quarterfinals and Semifinals, then at Purdue University at Folk Field for the Finals. The eight-team single-elimination tournament consisted of three rounds based on seeding from regular season conference play. Washington were the defending champions. Washington was unable to defend its title, falling to Michigan State in the quarterfinals. The Purdue Boilermakers would go on to defeat Michigan State after extra time in the Final and win the tournament. The conference tournament title was the second for Purdue and first Big Ten title for head coach Richard Moodie. As tournament champions, Purdue earned the Big Ten's automatic bid to the 2026 NCAA Division I women's soccer tournament.

== Seeding ==
The top eight teams in the regular season earned a spot in the tournament. Teams were seeded based on regular season conference records. A tiebreaker was required between UCLA and Purdue as both teams finished with 9–2–1 regular season conference records. UCLA won the regular season matchup between the two teams 2–1 on September 10, and was therefore the second seed. A second tiebreaker was required between Washington and Penn State as both teams finished with 7–2–3 regular season conference records. Washington won the regular season matchup between the two teams 1–0 on October 11, and was therefore the fifth seed.

Seed	School	Conference	Points
1	Ohio State	11–1–0	33
2	UCLA	9–2–1	28
3	Purdue	9–2–1	28
4	Michigan State	9–3–0	27
5	Washington	7–2–3	24
6	Penn State	7–2–3	24
7	Wisconsin	6–3–3	21
8	Michigan	5–5–2	17

== Bracket ==
Quarterfinals; Wednesday, Nov 4 Thursday, Nov 5
1	Ohio State	1
8	Michigan	2
4	Michigan State (a.e.t.)	3
5	Washington	2
2	UCLA	0
7	Wisconsin (a.e.t.)	1
3	Purdue (a.e.t.)	2
6	Penn State	1

Semifinals; Sunday, Nov 8
8	Michigan	0
4	Michigan State	1
7	Wisconsin	2 (3)
3	Purdue (pen.)	2 (4)

Final; Friday, 13
4	Michigan State	3
3	Purdue (a.e.t.)	4

== Schedule ==
=== Quarterfinals ===
November 4	(1) Ohio State	1–2	(8) Michigan	St. Louis, MO
4:00 p.m. CST	Anika Poremba 1'	Report	45', 69' Adi Walick; (yellow card) 77' Ellie Fife	Stadium: Energizer Park; Attendance: 900; Referee: Victor Borges; Assistant referees: Colby Johnson; Cory Richardson; Fourth official: Braeden Frey

November 4	(2) UCLA	0–1 (a.e.t.)	(7) Wisconsin	St. Louis, MO
7:00 p.m. CST		Report	(yellow card) 45' KK Panella; 92' Hailey Baumann	Stadium: Energizer Park; Attendance: 1,010; Referee: Jeremy Fonseca; Assistant referees: Dilyn Davies; Dana Breedlove-Hackney; Fourth official: Blake Gibson

November 5	(4) Michigan State	3–2 (a.e.t.)	(5) Washington	St. Louis, MO
4:00 p.m. CST	Faith George 13'; Bella Najera 50', 96'	Report	60' Maylen Montoya; 82' Andrea Leyva	Stadium: Energizer Park; Attendance: 956; Referee: Kyle Johnston; Assistant referees: Sean West; Zachary Richter; Fourth official: Aaron Rawlins

November 5	(3) Purdue	2–1 (a.e.t.)	(6) Penn State	St. Louis, MO
7:00 p.m. CST	Rosa Maalouf (yellow card) 26'; Jaiden Anderson 48'; Zoe Miles (yellow card) 70'; Irene Campo 92'	Report	64' Paige Kalal; (yellow card) 87' Aubrey Kulpa; (yellow card) 91' Bella Ayscue	Stadium: Energizer Park; Attendance: 1,001; Referee: Erin Patterson; Assistant referees: Justin Tatsak; Shane Richards; Fourth official: Mandy Love

=== Semifinals ===
November 8	(8) Michigan	0–1	(4) Michigan State	St. Louis, MO
1:00 p.m. CST	Ella Jablinskey (yellow card) 44'; Luciana Latino (yellow card) 87'	Report	(yellow card) 29' Kaleigh McPherson; 40' (free kick) Renee Watson	Stadium: Energizer Park; Attendance: 1,104; Referee: John Kennedy; Assistant referees: Laura Snyder; Adam Herges; Fourth official: Grace Barrett

November 8	(7) Wisconsin	2–2 (a.e.t.) (3–4 p)	(3) Purdue	St. Louis, MO
4:00 p.m. CST	Abby Ballek 18'; Erin Connolly 30'	Report	30', 78' (pen.) Irene Campo; (yellow card) 82' Emilia Deppe; (yellow card) 88' Rosa Maalouf; (yellow card) 106' McKenzie Carle	Stadium: Energizer Park; Attendance: 1,121; Referee: Ashley Cedro; Assistant referees: Maggie Short; Eulogio Villalpando; Fourth official: Velimir Milovic
	Penalties
	Erin Connolly (penalty missed); Kiara Gilmore (penalty scored); Hailey Baumann (penalty scored); Izy Traub (penalty scored); Abby Ballek (penalty missed)		(penalty scored) Emilia Deppe; (penalty scored) Megan Santa Cruz; (penalty scored) Irene Campo; (penalty missed) Jaiden Anderson; (penalty scored) Cherry Yu

=== Final ===
November 13	(4) Michigan State	3–4 (a.e.t.)	(3) Purdue	West Lafayette, IN
6:00 p.m. EST	Kayla Briggs 42'; Renee Watson (yellow card) 59'; Bella Najera 61'; Mackenzie Kruer 89'	Report	(yellow card) 24' (goal) 97' Jaiden Anderson; 34' Rosa Maalouf; 40' Addison Feldman; 50' McKenzie Carle	Stadium: Folk Field; Attendance: 2,500; Referee: Nikola Aleksic; Assistant referees: Christopher Lauer; Josh Flew; Fourth official: Dimitar Chavdarov

== Statistics ==
=== Goalscorers ===
There were 24 goals scored in 7 matches, for an average of 3.43 goals per match (as of November 18, 2026).

3 goals

- Bella Najera – Michigan State
- Irene Campo – Purdue

2 goals

- Adi Walick – Michigan
- Jaiden Anderson – Purdue

1 goal

- Anika Poremba – Ohio State
- Andrea Leyva – Washington
- Maylen Montoya – Washington
- Paige Kalal – Penn State
- Mackenzie Kruer – Michigan State
- Hailey Baumann – Wisconsin
- Erin Connolly – Wisconsin
- Abby Ballek – Wisconsin
- Renee Watson – Michigan State
- Kayla Briggs – Michigan State
- Faith George – Michigan State
- Rosa Maalouf – Purdue
- McKenzie Carle – Purdue
- Addison Feldman – Purdue

== All-Tournament team ==
Player	Team
Ellie Fife	Michigan
Bella Najera	Michigan State
Renee Watson	Michigan State
Anika Poremba	Ohio State
Bella Ayscue	Penn State
**Irene Campo**	Purdue
Bianca Hanisch	Purdue
Cherry Yu	Purdue
Paloma Daubert	UCLA
Maylen Montoya	Washington
Hailey Baumann	Wisconsin

MVP in bold
