= 2026 NCAA Division I women's soccer season =

American college soccer season

- Duration: August 12 – December 13, 2026
- Number of teams: 349
- Preseason No. 1: Stanford

Statistics
- Highest attendance: 25,433; James Madison at Georgia (August 30)

Tournament
- Duration: November 20 – December 13, 2026

Women's College Cup
- Date: December 10–13, 2026
- Site: WakeMed Soccer Park Cary, NC

Seasons
- ← 2025 2027 →

The 2026 NCAA Division I women's soccer season is the 45th season of NCAA championship women's college soccer. The season began August 12, 2026, and is scheduled to conclude with the 2026 NCAA Division I women's soccer championship game on December 13, 2026.

The Florida State Seminoles are the defending champions. They defeated conference foe Stanford in the final.

In May 2026, the NCAA Division I Men's Soccer Oversight Committee approved a proposed change to the soccer schedule. Under the new schedule, the season would be divided between spring and fall segments, with a winter break from late November until mid-February. The NCAA Tournament and College Cup would take place in the spring. The new schedule would take effect with the 2027–28 academic year. This change would only affect the men's side of college soccer, and not the women's.

However, in June 2026, the proposed schedule failed to gain the necessary approval of the Division I Cabinet. The Cabinet remanded the proposal to the Divison I Men's Soccer Oversight Committee, asking the committee to provide further clarity. It is unknown whether the new schedule will be approved, or if it is, when it will be implemented. Thus, both men and women's college soccer remains on similar fall-only schedules.

== Changes from 2025 ==
=== Coaching changes ===
The following coaching changes occurred during the 2025–26 offseason.

Program	Outgoing coach	Manner of departure	Date of vacancy (Note: When retirement at end of season was announced, the date of vacancy is the affected program's last game of the 2025 season.)	Incoming coach	Date of appointment	References
American	Marsha Harper	Contract not Renewed	November 10, 2025	Phil Casella	December 19, 2025	
Arkansas–Pine Bluff	Emanuel Stephens	resigns	February 1, 2026	Fred Locario	June 17, 2026	
Central Michigan	Jeremy Groves	Contract not Renewed	November 3, 2025	James DeCosemo	December 10, 2025	
Coastal Carolina	Jo Chubb	Resigned	February 18, 2026	Pete Cuadrado	April 3, 2026	
Delaware State	Natasha Ademakinwa		May 21, 2026	Ousmane Camara	May 21, 2026	
Drexel	Ray Goon	Retired	October 28, 2025	Shannon Grogan	December 3, 2025	
Florida	Samantha Bohon	Contract not Renewed	November 12, 2025	Nick Zimmerman	December 5, 2025	
Fresno State	Brian Zwaschka	Contract not Renewed	November 18, 2025	Gabriel Bolton	December 24, 2025	
Gardner–Webb	Erik Solberg	Hired by Tarleton State	April 28, 2026	Samantha Thomsit	May 28, 2026	
Grambling State	Justin Wagar		June 9, 2026	Chris Logan	June 9, 2026	
Hampton	Scot Vorwold		March 20, 2026	Sam Cain	March 20, 2026	
Iowa	Dave Dilanni	Hired by Michigan	January 27, 2026	Dean Ward	February 12, 2026	
Le Moyne	Jaro Zawislan	Contract not Renewed	November 17, 2025	Taylor Van Fleet	January 8, 2026	
Lipscomb	Kevin O'Brien	Hired by Mississippi State	December 7, 2025	Kathleen Paulson	December 23, 2025	
Louisiana–Monroe	Will Roberts	Hired by Old Dominion	December 22, 2025	Antony Blackburn	January 17, 2026	
Louisiana Tech	Steve Voltz	Relieved of Duties	November 10, 2025	Matt Lodge	November 25, 2025	
Louisville	Karen Ferguson-Dayes	Retired	February 19, 2026	Hunter Norton	February 19, 2026	
McNeese	Juan Yepes		November 20, 2025	Alexsis Cable	November 20, 2025	
Michigan	Jennifer Klein	Resigned	January 8, 2026	Dave Dilanni	January 27, 2026	
Mississippi State	Nick Zimmerman	Hired by Florida	December 5, 2025	Kevin O'Brien	December 7, 2025	
Montana	Chris Citowicki	Hired by Washington State	December 12, 2025	Stuart Gore	February 2, 2026	
Murray State	Matt Lodge	Hired by Louisiana Tech	November 25, 2025	Ben Madsen	December 23, 2025	
Nevada	Vanessa Valentine	Resigned	December 4, 2025	Jeremy Evans	December 22, 2025	
New Mexico	Heather Dyche	Hired by U.S. Soccer	November 4, 2025	Karley Nelson	November 12, 2025	
Old Dominion	Angie Hind	Resigned	December 3, 2025	Will Roberts	December 22, 2025	
Ole Miss	Molly Rouse	Contract not Renewed	November 10, 2025	Todd Shulenberger	December 1, 2025	
Sacramento State	Randy Dedini	Contract not Renewed	December 19, 2025	Tim Strader	March 3, 2026	
Saint Peter's	Julia Bazi		April 8, 2026	Sammy Adjei	April 8, 2026	
Southern Miss	Mohammed El-Zare	Resigned	November 5, 2025	Danny Owens	December 5, 2025	
Southern Utah	Kai Edwards	Hired by San Diego State	March 12, 2026	Steven Lindquist	April 3, 2026	
St. Bonaventure	Melissa Sherwood	Contract not Renewed	January 28, 2026	Ray Leone	February 19, 2026	
St. Thomas	Sheila McGill	Contract not Renewed	October 27, 2025	Gretta Macdonald	December 17, 2025	
Tarleton State	Pete Cuadrado	Hired by Coastal Carolina	April 3, 2026	Erik Solberg	April 28, 2026	
Texas	Ange Kelly	Amicable	November 24, 2025	Margueritte Aozasa	November 25, 2025	
Texas A&M	G Guerrieri	Retired	October 28, 2025	Bobby Shuttleworth	December 9, 2025	
Troy	Stuart Gore	Resigned	October 30, 2025	Jake Wyman	December 11, 2025	
UCLA	Margueritte Aozasa	Hired by Texas	November 24, 2025	Gof Boyoko	December 12, 2025	
UNLV	Jenny Ruiz-Williams	Resigned	November 4, 2025	Kacey Bingham	December 10, 2025	
USC Upstate	Mark Laudenslager	Contract not Extended (interim)	December 4, 2025	Sam Odell	December 4, 2025	
UTRGV	Mark Foster	Resigned	January 6, 2026	Nataki Stewart	February 4, 2026	
Wagner	Phil Casella	Hired by American	December 19, 2025	Fred King	February 6, 2026	
Washington State	Todd Shulenberger	Hired by Ole Miss	December 1, 2025	Chris Citowicki	December 12, 2025	
Xavier	Dean Ward	Hired by Iowa	February 12, 2026	Katy Etelman	February 17, 2026	

=== Conference realignment ===
The Pac-12 Conference resumed full operation in July 2026 after a two-season hiatus, with women's soccer as one of the 19 sponsored sports.

Meanwhile, the WAC reconfigured and rebranded as the United Athletic Conference, and continues to sponsor women's soccer.

As a result of the above changes in conference sponsorship, 32 conferences will have automatic bids to the 2026 NCAA Division I women's soccer tournament.

Team	Conference in 2025	Conference in 2026
Austin Peay	ASUN	UAC
Boise State	MW	Pac-12
California Baptist	WAC	Big West
Central Arkansas	ASUN	UAC
Colorado State	MW	Pac-12
Denver	Summit	WCC
Eastern Kentucky	ASUN	UAC
Fresno State	MW	Pac-12
Gonzaga	WCC	Pac-12
Hawaii	Big West	MW
Little Rock	OVC	UAC
Louisiana Tech	CUSA	Sun Belt
Mississippi Valley State	SWAC	None (dropped soccer)
North Alabama	ASUN	UAC
Northern Illinois	MVC	Horizon
Oregon State	WCC	Pac-12
Sacramento State	Big Sky	Big West
Saint Francis	NEC	PAC (D-III)
San Diego State	MW	Pac-12
Southern Utah	WAC	Big Sky
Tennessee Tech	OVC	SoCon
Texas State	Sun Belt	Pac-12
UC Davis	Big West	MW
Utah State	MW	Pac-12
Utah Tech	WAC	Big Sky
Utah Valley	WAC	Big West
UTEP	CUSA	MW
Washington State	WCC	Pac-12
West Florida	GSC (D-II)	ASUN
West Georgia	ASUN	UAC

==== Changes for 2027 ====
Two members of the Big West Conference will leave that conference for the WCC after the 2026–27 school year. At the same time, Fairfield will leave the Metro Conference for the Coastal Athletic Association.

Team	Conference in 2026	Conference in 2027
Fairfield	Metro	CAA
UC San Diego	Big West	WCC
UC Santa Barbara	Big West	WCC

== Other news ==
- May 27 – The Metro Atlantic Athletic Conference announced that it would rename itself as the Metro Conference effective July 1.
- June 23 – The NCAA Division I Cabinet unanimously approved a new age-based eligibility proposal for that division, which officially took effect with the end of the Cabinet's meeting the next day. Under the new model, students will have five years of athletic eligibility, and will be able to play in all five years. Athletes' eligibility clocks start with the earlier of (1) their full-time enrollment in a degree-granting institution or (2) the start of the academic year that immediately follows an individual's 19th birthday. Redshirting is no longer allowed, even for medical reasons; the only exceptions allowed for male athletes are for full-time military service or religious missions. Students enrolling full-time in college for the first time in 2026, plus those who had remaining eligibility under previous rules at the end of 2025–26, can use whichever model is most advantageous to them. Those who exhausted their eligibility under previous rules in 2025–26 will not receive any additional eligibility, even if they initially enrolled in 2022–23 (giving them four years of eligibility).
- June 24 – On the same day the new age-based eligibility model took effect, a group of 15 college basketball players, all of whom graduated from high school in 2022 and exhausted their eligibility under the previous rules in 2025–26, filed suit in Hamilton County, Ohio challenging the application of the new model to their high school cohort. Other suits on similar grounds were expected to be filed in other states.
- June 26 – The Coastal Athletic Association announced that Fairfield would join from the Metro Conference in July 2027.
- July 31 – Rulings in two separate court cases undercut the NCAA's planned "five for five" eligibility model as applied to 2022 high school graduates. First, a Tennessee state court judge granted a temporary injunction that allowed 19 basketball players in that class an extra season of eligibility. Several hours later, a federal judge in Colorado issued a preliminary injunction that applied to all members of the high school class of 2022 who had exhausted athletic eligibility, regardless of sport, and also provided those individuals an extra season of eligibility. The NCAA was expected to appeal.
- August 20 – In an event billed as "Soccer at Sanford" (i.e., Georgia's football home of Sanford Stadium), honoring the 30th anniversary of the first Olympic women's soccer final, in which the US defeated China at that venue, Georgia defeated James Madison 6–0 before a crowd of 25,433, a new record for an NCAA soccer match regardless of sex.

== Season outlook ==
=== Preseason polls ===
United Soccer Coaches
Rank	Team
1	Stanford
2	Notre Dame
3	Duke
4	Florida State
5	Vanderbilt
6	TCU
7	Michigan State
8	North Carolina
9	UCLA
10	Arkansas
11	Virginia
12	Washington
13	Colorado
14	Georgetown
15	Kansas
16	LSU
17	Ohio State
18	Wake Forest
19	Georgia
20	West Virginia
21	Memphis
22	Wisconsin
23	Texas Tech
24	Tennessee
25	Clemson

== Regular season ==
=== Major upsets ===
In this list, a "major upset" is defined as a game won by an unranked team that defeats a team ranked No. 15 or higher, or a team ranked 10 spots lower than the other team.

All rankings are from the United Soccer Coaches Poll. Home team is shown in italics.

Date	Winner	Score	Loser
August 12	BYU	2–1	No. 9 UCLA
August 12	Baylor	4–1	No. 10 Arkansas
August 19	Wisconsin	1–0	No. 9 BYU
August 23	Texas State	3–1	No. 6 Baylor
August 23	Florida	3–1	No. 3 Florida State
September 6	No. 13 UCF	0–7	Brown
September 6	Harvard	6–4	No. 6 Alabama
September 10	No. 15 Texas State	2–3	Louisiana
September 10	No. 13 BYU	0–4	USU
October 1	No. 13 Tennessee	0–1	Auburn
October 8	No. 5 Alabama	0–1	Florida
October 8	No. 7 Baylor	0–3	No. 24 Colorado
October 16	UCF	1–0	No. 12 West Virginia
October 22	No. 10 UCLA	0–1	Iowa
October 22	Penn State	2–1	No. 5 Michigan State

=== Conference standings ===
2026 ACC women's soccer standings
	Conf.						Overall
Team	W		L		T	PCT	W		L		T	PCT
Boston College ‍‍‍	0	–	0	–	0	–	4	–	0	–	0	1.000
NC State ‍‍‍	0	–	0	–	0	–	6	–	0	–	0	1.000
No. 5 Wake Forest ‍‍‍	0	–	0	–	0	–	5	–	0	–	0	1.000
No. 13 Virginia ‍‍‍	0	–	0	–	0	–	4	–	0	–	0	1.000
No. 1 Stanford ‍‍‍	0	–	0	–	0	–	5	–	0	–	0	1.000
No. 2 Duke ‍‍‍	0	–	0	–	0	–	5	–	0	–	1	.917
Virginia Tech ‍‍‍	0	–	0	–	0	–	4	–	0	–	2	.833
Miami (FL) ‍‍‍	0	–	0	–	0	–	4	–	1	–	0	.800
Louisville ‍‍‍	0	–	0	–	0	–	4	–	1	–	0	.800
No. 16 Florida State ‍‍‍	0	–	0	–	0	–	3	–	1	–	0	.750
No. 9 North Carolina ‍‍‍	0	–	0	–	0	–	3	–	1	–	0	.750
Pittsburgh ‍‍‍	0	–	0	–	0	–	4	–	1	–	1	.750
SMU ‍‍‍	0	–	0	–	0	–	4	–	1	–	1	.750
Syracuse ‍‍‍	0	–	0	–	0	–	3	–	1	–	2	.667
No. 25 Notre Dame ‍‍‍	0	–	0	–	0	–	1	–	0	–	4	.600
Clemson ‍‍‍	0	–	0	–	0	–	2	–	1	–	2	.600
California ‍‍‍	0	–	0	–	0	–	1	–	2	–	2	.400
† – Conference champion ‡ – 2026 ACC Tournament champion y – Invited to the NCAA Tournament; As of August 31, 2026; Rankings from United Soccer Coaches Poll; Source: The ACC

2026 America East Conference women's soccer standings
	Conf.						Overall
Team	W		L		T	PCT	W		L		T	PCT
Binghamton ‍‍‍	0	–	0	–	0	–	3	–	0	–	2	.800
UMBC ‍‍‍	0	–	0	–	0	–	3	–	1	–	2	.667
New Hampshire ‍‍‍	0	–	0	–	0	–	2	–	1	–	2	.600
Bryant ‍‍‍	0	–	0	–	0	–	1	–	2	–	1	.375
NJIT ‍‍‍	0	–	0	–	0	–	1	–	2	–	1	.375
Maine ‍‍‍	0	–	0	–	0	–	1	–	3	–	1	.300
UMass Lowell ‍‍‍	0	–	0	–	0	–	1	–	3	–	1	.300
Vermont ‍‍‍	0	–	0	–	0	–	0	–	3	–	2	.200
Albany ‍‍‍	0	–	0	–	0	–	0	–	4	–	0	.000
† – Conference champion ‡ – 2026 America East Tournament champion y – Invited to the NCAA Tournament; As of August 31, 2026; Rankings from United Soccer Coaches Poll; Source:America East Conference

2026 American Conference women's soccer standings
	Conf.						Overall
Team	W		L		T	PCT	W		L		T	PCT
Temple ‍‍‍	0	–	0	–	0	–	4	–	1	–	0	.800
UTSA ‍‍‍	0	–	0	–	0	–	2	–	0	–	3	.700
Tulsa ‍‍‍	0	–	0	–	0	–	3	–	2	–	0	.600
Charlotte ‍‍‍	0	–	0	–	0	–	3	–	2	–	0	.600
North Texas ‍‍‍	0	–	0	–	0	–	2	–	2	–	1	.500
No. 24 Memphis ‍‍‍	0	–	0	–	0	–	2	–	2	–	0	.500
East Carolina ‍‍‍	0	–	0	–	0	–	1	–	2	–	3	.417
Rice ‍‍‍	0	–	0	–	0	–	1	–	2	–	2	.400
Florida Atlantic ‍‍‍	0	–	0	–	0	–	1	–	2	–	2	.400
UAB ‍‍‍	0	–	0	–	0	–	1	–	3	–	1	.300
South Florida ‍‍‍	0	–	0	–	0	–	1	–	3	–	0	.250
† – Conference champion ‡ – 2026 American Tournament champion y – Invited to the NCAA Tournament; As of August 31, 2026; Rankings from United Soccer Coaches Poll; Source:American Conference

2026 ASUN Conference women's soccer standings
	Conf.						Overall
Team	W		L		T	PCT	W		L		T	PCT
West Florida ^{#} ‍‍‍	0	–	0	–	0	–	1	–	0	–	0	1.000
Florida Gulf Coast ‍‍‍	0	–	0	–	0	–	2	–	1	–	2	.600
Lipscomb ‍‍‍	0	–	0	–	0	–	2	–	1	–	2	.600
North Florida ‍‍‍	0	–	0	–	0	–	1	–	1	–	2	.500
Jacksonville ‍‍‍	0	–	0	–	0	–	1	–	1	–	1	.500
Bellarmine ‍‍‍	0	–	0	–	0	–	0	–	2	–	1	.167
Queens ‍‍‍	0	–	0	–	0	–	0	–	3	–	1	.125
Stetson ‍‍‍	0	–	0	–	0	–	0	–	4	–	0	.000
† – Conference champion ‡ – 2026 ASUN Tournament champion y – Invited to the NCAA Tournament^{#} – Ineligible for post-season (In transition); As of August 31, 2026; Rankings from United Soccer Coaches Poll; Source:Atlantic Sun Conference

2026 Atlantic 10 Conference women's soccer standings
	Conf.						Overall
Team	W		L		T	PCT	W		L		T	PCT
Saint Joseph's ‍‍‍	0	–	0	–	0	–	3	–	0	–	1	.875
Richmond ‍‍‍	0	–	0	–	0	–	2	–	0	–	2	.750
George Mason ‍‍‍	0	–	0	–	0	–	3	–	1	–	1	.700
Saint Louis ‍‍‍	0	–	0	–	0	–	3	–	1	–	1	.700
Duquesne ‍‍‍	0	–	0	–	0	–	3	–	2	–	0	.600
Davidson ‍‍‍	0	–	0	–	0	–	2	–	2	–	1	.500
Fordham ‍‍‍	0	–	0	–	0	–	2	–	2	–	0	.500
Loyola-Chicago ‍‍‍	0	–	0	–	0	–	2	–	2	–	0	.500
Rhode Island ‍‍‍	0	–	0	–	0	–	2	–	3	–	1	.417
St. Bonaventure ‍‍‍	0	–	0	–	0	–	2	–	3	–	0	.400
George Washington ‍‍‍	0	–	0	–	0	–	1	–	2	–	2	.400
LaSalle ‍‍‍	0	–	0	–	0	–	1	–	3	–	1	.300
Dayton ‍‍‍	0	–	0	–	0	–	1	–	3	–	1	.300
VCU ‍‍‍	0	–	0	–	0	–	0	–	5	–	1	.083
† – Conference champion ‡ – 2026 Atlantic 10 Tournament champion y – Invited to the NCAA Tournament; As of August 31, 2026; Rankings from United Soccer Coaches Poll; Source:A10 Conference

2026 Big 12 Conference women's soccer standings
	Conf.						Overall
Team	W		L		T	PCT	W		L		T	PCT
No. 10 Baylor ‍‍‍	7	–	1	–	1	.833	14	–	2	–	1	.853
No. 7 Texas Tech ‍‍‍	7	–	1	–	1	.833	11	–	1	–	4	.813
No. 16 Kansas ‍‍‍	6	–	1	–	2	.778	12	–	3	–	2	.765
Houston ‍‍‍	6	–	2	–	1	.722	10	–	3	–	4	.706
No. 6 Colorado ‍‍‍	6	–	3	–	0	.667	12	–	4	–	1	.735
No. 14 BYU ‍‍‍	5	–	1	–	2	.750	9	–	3	–	3	.700
UCF ‍‍‍	5	–	3	–	1	.611	10	–	4	–	1	.700
No. 12 West Virginia ‍‍‍	4	–	4	–	1	.500	9	–	4	–	2	.667
Arizona ‍‍‍	2	–	3	–	4	.444	5	–	7	–	5	.441
Arizona State ‍‍‍	3	–	5	–	1	.389	8	–	6	–	3	.559
Oklahoma State ‍‍‍	2	–	5	–	2	.333	6	–	7	–	4	.471
Cincinnati ‍‍‍	2	–	5	–	2	.333	4	–	7	–	5	.406
Utah ‍‍‍	1	–	5	–	3	.278	4	–	8	–	5	.382
TCU ‍‍‍	2	–	7	–	0	.222	5	–	9	–	1	.367
Kansas State ‍‍‍	1	–	7	–	1	.167	6	–	7	–	4	.471
Iowa State ‍‍‍	0	–	6	–	2	.125	4	–	8	–	4	.375
† – Conference champion ‡ – 2026 Big 12 Tournament champion y – Invited to the NCAA Tournament; As of October 30, 2026; Rankings from United Soccer Coaches Poll; Source: The Big 12 Conference

2026 Big East Conference women's soccer standings
	Conf.						Overall
Team	W		L		T	PCT	W		L		T	PCT
Seton Hall ‍‍‍	0	–	0	–	0	–	4	–	0	–	2	.833
Villanova ‍‍‍	0	–	0	–	0	–	5	–	0	–	3	.813
Xavier ‍‍‍	0	–	0	–	0	–	6	–	2	–	0	.750
Butler ‍‍‍	0	–	0	–	0	–	5	–	2	–	1	.688
Marquette ‍‍‍	0	–	0	–	0	–	4	–	1	–	4	.667
Georgetown ‍‍‍	0	–	0	–	0	–	3	–	2	–	2	.571
DePaul ‍‍‍	0	–	0	–	0	–	3	–	2	–	3	.563
Creighton ‍‍‍	0	–	0	–	0	–	4	–	3	–	1	.563
Providence ‍‍‍	0	–	0	–	0	–	2	–	1	–	6	.556
Connecticut ‍‍‍	0	–	0	–	0	–	2	–	2	–	3	.500
St. John's ‍‍‍	0	–	0	–	0	–	3	–	4	–	1	.438
† – Conference champion ‡ – 2026 Big East Tournament champion y – Invited to the NCAA Tournament; As of September 21, 2026; Rankings from United Soccer Coaches Poll; Source:The Big East Conference

2026 Big Sky Conference women's soccer standings
	Conf.						Overall
Team	W		L		T	PCT	W		L		T	PCT
Idaho ‍‍‍	0	–	0	–	0	–	6	–	2	–	1	.722
Eastern Washington ‍‍‍	0	–	0	–	0	–	5	–	2	–	1	.688
Northern Arizona ‍‍‍	0	–	0	–	0	–	4	–	4	–	2	.500
Utah Tech ‍‍‍	0	–	0	–	0	–	4	–	4	–	1	.500
Northern Colorado ‍‍‍	0	–	0	–	0	–	3	–	4	–	2	.444
Southern Utah ‍‍‍	0	–	0	–	0	–	3	–	5	–	1	.389
Weber St. ‍‍‍	0	–	0	–	0	–	3	–	5	–	1	.389
Idaho St. ‍‍‍	0	–	0	–	0	–	2	–	5	–	2	.333
Montana ‍‍‍	0	–	0	–	0	–	2	–	6	–	0	.250
Portland St. ‍‍‍	0	–	0	–	0	–	2	–	7	–	0	.222
† – Conference champion ‡ – 2026 Big Sky Tournament champion y – Invited to the NCAA Tournament; As of September 21, 2026; Rankings from United Soccer Coaches Poll; Source:The Big Sky Conference

2026 Big South Conference women's soccer standings
	Conf.						Overall
Team	W		L		T	PCT	W		L		T	PCT
UNC Asheville ‍‍‍	1	–	0	–	0	1.000	4	–	3	–	3	.550
High Point ‍‍‍	1	–	0	–	0	1.000	2	–	6	–	1	.278
Charleston Southern ‍‍‍	1	–	0	–	0	1.000	2	–	6	–	0	.250
USC Upstate ‍‍‍	0	–	0	–	0	–	4	–	2	–	3	.611
Gardner-Webb ‍‍‍	0	–	0	–	0	–	3	–	5	–	1	.389
Radford ‍‍‍	0	–	0	–	0	–	2	–	5	–	1	.313
Longwood ‍‍‍	0	–	1	–	0	.000	3	–	5	–	2	.400
Presbyterian ‍‍‍	0	–	1	–	0	.000	2	–	4	–	1	.357
Winthrop ‍‍‍	0	–	1	–	0	.000	3	–	6	–	1	.350
† – Conference champion ‡ – 2026 Big South Tournament champion y – Invited to the NCAA Tournament; As of September 21, 2026; Rankings from United Soccer Coaches Poll; Source:Big South Conference

2026 Big Ten Conference women's soccer standings
	Conf.						Overall
Team	W		L		T	PCT	W		L		T	PCT
No. 11 Washington ‍‍‍	2	–	0	–	1	.833	7	–	0	–	2	.889
No. 14 Wisconsin ‍‍‍	2	–	0	–	1	.833	6	–	1	–	2	.778
Michigan ‍‍‍	2	–	1	–	0	.667	4	–	1	–	3	.688
No. 1 Michigan St ‍‍‍	2	–	1	–	0	.667	6	–	1	–	2	.778
No. 5 Ohio St ‍‍‍	2	–	1	–	0	.667	6	–	1	–	1	.813
Penn St ‍‍‍	2	–	1	–	0	.667	4	–	2	–	2	.625
Purdue ‍‍‍	2	–	1	–	0	.667	8	–	1	–	1	.850
No. 21 UCLA ‍‍‍	2	–	1	–	0	.667	5	–	3	–	1	.611
Minnesota ‍‍‍	1	–	1	–	1	.500	5	–	2	–	2	.667
Northwestern ‍‍‍	1	–	1	–	1	.500	3	–	4	–	3	.450
Oregon ‍‍‍	1	–	1	–	1	.500	6	–	1	–	2	.778
Indiana ‍‍‍	1	–	2	–	0	.333	4	–	4	–	1	.500
Rutgers ‍‍‍	1	–	2	–	0	.333	2	–	3	–	3	.438
Illinois ‍‍‍	0	–	1	–	2	.333	3	–	1	–	5	.611
Iowa ‍‍‍	0	–	1	–	2	.333	5	–	2	–	3	.650
Nebraska ‍‍‍	0	–	1	–	2	.333	2	–	2	–	5	.500
USC ‍‍‍	0	–	2	–	1	.167	1	–	5	–	3	.278
Maryland ‍‍‍	0	–	3	–	0	.000	3	–	5	–	1	.389
† – Conference champion ‡ – 2026 Big Ten Tournament champion y – Invited to the NCAA Tournament; As of September 21, 2026; Rankings from United Soccer Coaches Poll; Source:Big Ten

2026 Big West Conference women's soccer standings
	Conf.						Overall
Team	W		L		T	PCT	W		L		T	PCT
Cal Baptist ‍‍‍	0	–	0	–	0	–	5	–	0	–	1	.917
Long Beach St ‍‍‍	0	–	0	–	0	–	6	–	1	–	2	.778
UC Santa Barbara ‍‍‍	0	–	0	–	0	–	5	–	1	–	3	.722
Sacramento State ‍‍‍	0	–	0	–	0	–	4	–	2	–	2	.625
UC San Diego ‍‍‍	0	–	0	–	0	–	4	–	2	–	2	.625
Cal State Fullerton ‍‍‍	0	–	0	–	0	–	3	–	2	–	3	.563
Utah Valley ‍‍‍	0	–	0	–	0	–	4	–	4	–	1	.500
Cal Poly ‍‍‍	0	–	0	–	0	–	3	–	3	–	2	.500
UC Irvine ‍‍‍	0	–	0	–	0	–	2	–	3	–	2	.429
Cal State Northridge ‍‍‍	0	–	0	–	0	–	2	–	4	–	3	.389
UC Riverside ‍‍‍	0	–	0	–	0	–	2	–	5	–	0	.286
Cal State Bakersfield ‍‍‍	0	–	0	–	0	–	1	–	7	–	1	.167
† – Conference champion ‡ – 2026 Big West Tournament champion y – Invited to the NCAA Tournament; As of September 21, 2026; Rankings from United Soccer Coaches Poll; Source:The Big West Conference

2026 Coastal Athletic Association women's soccer standings
	Conf.						Overall
Team	W		L		T	PCT	W		L		T	PCT
North
Stony Brook ‍‍‍	1	–	0	–	0	1.000	4	–	0	–	4	.750
Northeastern ‍‍‍	1	–	0	–	0	1.000	3	–	4	–	2	.444
Hofstra ‍‍‍	1	–	0	–	0	1.000	2	–	5	–	2	.333
Monmouth ‍‍‍	0	–	1	–	0	.000	5	–	2	–	2	.667
Drexel ‍‍‍	0	–	1	–	0	.000	4	–	4	–	1	.500
Towson ‍‍‍	0	–	1	–	0	.000	3	–	4	–	2	.444
South
UNC Wilmington ‍‍‍	1	–	0	–	0	1.000	6	–	0	–	4	.800
Elon ‍‍‍	1	–	0	–	0	1.000	6	–	1	–	2	.778
Charleston ‍‍‍	0	–	0	–	1	.500	3	–	4	–	3	.450
William & Mary ‍‍‍	0	–	0	–	1	.500	1	–	4	–	3	.313
Campbell ‍‍‍	0	–	1	–	0	.000	3	–	5	–	2	.400
Hampton ‍‍‍	0	–	1	–	0	.000	1	–	6	–	1	.188
† – Conference champion ‡ – 2026 CAA Tournament champion y – Invited to the NCAA Tournament; As of September 21, 2026; Rankings from United Soccer Coaches Poll; Source: Coastal Athletic Association

2026 Conference USA women's soccer standings
	Conf.						Overall
Team	W		L		T	PCT	W		L		T	PCT
Liberty ‍‍‍	6	–	0	–	1	.929	13	–	2	–	2	.824
Delaware ‍‍‍	5	–	1	–	1	.786	10	–	3	–	4	.706
Western Kentucky ‍‍‍	4	–	1	–	2	.714	10	–	1	–	6	.765
Florida International ‍‍‍	3	–	3	–	1	.500	6	–	6	–	4	.500
Middle Tennessee ‍‍‍	2	–	3	–	2	.429	9	–	5	–	4	.611
New Mexico St ‍‍‍	2	–	4	–	1	.357	3	–	11	–	3	.265
Sam Houston ‍‍‍	1	–	3	–	3	.357	5	–	5	–	6	.500
Missouri State ‍‍‍	1	–	3	–	3	.357	4	–	8	–	4	.375
Kennesaw State ‍‍‍	2	–	5	–	0	.286	5	–	9	–	3	.382
Jacksonville State ‍‍‍	1	–	4	–	2	.286	4	–	9	–	4	.353
† – Conference champion ‡ – 2026 C-USA Tournament champion y – Invited to the NCAA Tournament; As of October 29, 2026; Rankings from United Soccer Coaches Poll; Source:Conference USA

2026 Horizon League women's soccer standings
	Conf.						Overall
Team	W		L		T	PCT	W		L		T	PCT
Milwaukee ‍‍‍	10	–	0	–	0	1.000	12	–	4	–	2	.722
Green Bay ‍‍‍	7	–	1	–	2	.800	12	–	1	–	4	.824
Youngstown State ‍‍‍	5	–	2	–	3	.650	5	–	9	–	5	.395
Wright State ‍‍‍	5	–	3	–	2	.600	7	–	8	–	3	.472
Northern Kentucky ‍‍‍	5	–	3	–	2	.600	9	–	5	–	3	.618
IU Indy ‍‍‍	5	–	5	–	0	.500	7	–	9	–	2	.444
Cleveland State ‍‍‍	3	–	3	–	4	.500	3	–	10	–	4	.294
Northern Illinois ‍‍‍	3	–	4	–	3	.450	4	–	7	–	5	.406
Detroit Mercy ‍‍‍	3	–	6	–	1	.350	5	–	10	–	2	.353
Robert Morris ‍‍‍	2	–	5	–	3	.350	5	–	8	–	4	.412
Purdue Fort Wayne ‍‍‍	0	–	8	–	2	.100	1	–	13	–	3	.147
Oakland ‍‍‍	0	–	8	–	2	.100	1	–	12	–	3	.156
† – Conference champion ‡ – 2026 Horizon League Tournament champion y – Invited to the NCAA Tournament; As of October 29, 2026; Rankings from United Soccer Coaches Poll; Source:Horizon League

2026 Ivy League women's soccer standings
	Conf.						Overall
Team	W		L		T	PCT	W		L		T	PCT
Columbia ‍‍‍	4	–	1	–	0	.800	5	–	6	–	3	.464
Brown ‍‍‍	3	–	1	–	1	.700	9	–	3	–	2	.714
Dartmouth ‍‍‍	3	–	2	–	0	.600	9	–	3	–	2	.714
Harvard ‍‍‍	3	–	2	–	0	.600	9	–	4	–	1	.679
Princeton ‍‍‍	3	–	2	–	0	.600	7	–	5	–	1	.577
Penn ‍‍‍	1	–	2	–	2	.400	6	–	5	–	3	.536
Cornell ‍‍‍	1	–	3	–	1	.300	5	–	6	–	3	.464
Yale ‍‍‍	0	–	5	–	0	.000	5	–	9	–	0	.357
† – Conference champion ‡ – 2026 Ivy League Tournament champion y – Invited to the NCAA Tournament; As of October 29, 2026; Rankings from United Soccer Coaches Poll; Source:Ivy League

2026 Mid-American Conference women's soccer standings
	Conf.						Overall
Team	W		L		T	PCT	W		L		T	PCT
Western Michigan ‍‍‍	7	–	2	–	1	.750	9	–	4	–	4	.647
Massachusetts ‍‍‍	4	–	1	–	5	.650	10	–	2	–	5	.735
Ball State ‍‍‍	4	–	2	–	4	.600	7	–	5	–	5	.559
Miami (OH) ‍‍‍	4	–	2	–	4	.600	8	–	6	–	4	.556
Kent State ‍‍‍	5	–	4	–	1	.550	6	–	8	–	3	.441
Eastern Michigan ‍‍‍	4	–	3	–	3	.550	6	–	4	–	6	.563
Bowling Green ‍‍‍	3	–	2	–	5	.550	7	–	3	–	6	.625
Akron ‍‍‍	3	–	3	–	4	.500	7	–	6	–	4	.529
Toledo ‍‍‍	2	–	3	–	5	.450	6	–	5	–	6	.529
Ohio ‍‍‍	2	–	6	–	2	.300	5	–	9	–	2	.375
Buffalo ‍‍‍	1	–	5	–	4	.300	4	–	7	–	6	.412
Central Michigan ‍‍‍	0	–	6	–	4	.200	2	–	10	–	5	.265
† – Conference champion ‡ – 2026 MAC Tournament champion y – Invited to the NCAA Tournament; As of October 29, 2026; Rankings from United Soccer Coaches Poll; Source:Mid-American Conference

2026 Metro women's soccer standings
	Conf.						Overall
Team	W		L		T	PCT	W		L		T	PCT
Niagara ‍‍‍	8	–	2	–	1	.773	11	–	3	–	1	.767
Quinnipiac ‍‍‍	8	–	2	–	0	.800	10	–	3	–	1	.750
Marist ‍‍‍	7	–	3	–	1	.682	7	–	8	–	1	.469
Siena ‍‍‍	7	–	3	–	0	.700	11	–	4	–	1	.719
Fairfield ‍‍‍	7	–	3	–	0	.700	9	–	6	–	1	.594
Manhattan ‍‍‍	6	–	1	–	3	.750	9	–	2	–	3	.750
Sacred Heart ‍‍‍	5	–	4	–	1	.550	10	–	5	–	1	.656
Canisius ‍‍‍	3	–	6	–	1	.350	6	–	8	–	1	.433
Iona ‍‍‍	3	–	6	–	1	.350	6	–	8	–	2	.438
Rider ‍‍‍	3	–	8	–	0	.273	4	–	9	–	1	.321
Mount St. Mary's ‍‍‍	2	–	7	–	1	.250	2	–	11	–	2	.200
St. Peter's ‍‍‍	1	–	8	–	1	.150	2	–	13	–	1	.156
Merrimack ‍‍‍	0	–	7	–	4	.182	2	–	10	–	5	.265
† – Conference champion ‡ – 2026 Metro Tournament champion y – Invited to the NCAA Tournament; As of October 29, 2026; Rankings from United Soccer Coaches Poll; Source:Metro Conference

2026 Missouri Valley Conference women's soccer standings
	Conf.						Overall
Team	W		L		T	PCT	W		L		T	PCT
Southern Illinois ‍‍‍	6	–	1	–	0	.857	12	–	3	–	0	.800
Drake ‍‍‍	5	–	0	–	2	.857	10	–	3	–	3	.719
Illinois State ‍‍‍	4	–	1	–	2	.714	9	–	2	–	5	.719
Indiana State ‍‍‍	2	–	1	–	4	.571	7	–	2	–	7	.656
Murray State ‍‍‍	2	–	2	–	3	.500	3	–	8	–	5	.344
Valparaiso ‍‍‍	2	–	4	–	1	.357	6	–	8	–	2	.438
Evansville ‍‍‍	2	–	4	–	1	.357	4	–	6	–	2	.417
Belmont ‍‍‍	2	–	5	–	0	.286	3	–	8	–	4	.333
UNI ‍‍‍	1	–	4	–	2	.286	1	–	11	–	3	.167
UIC ‍‍‍	1	–	5	–	1	.214	2	–	10	–	3	.233
† – Conference champion ‡ – 2026 Missouri Valley Tournament champion y – Invited to the NCAA Tournament; As of October 29, 2026; Rankings from United Soccer Coaches Poll; Source: Missouri Valley Conference

2026 Mountain West Conference women's soccer standings
	Conf.						Overall
Team	W		L		T	PCT	W		L		T	PCT
Colorado College ‍‍‍	6	–	1	–	1	.813	8	–	5	–	4	.588
Air Force ‍‍‍	6	–	2	–	0	.750	11	–	4	–	1	.719
Hawai'i ‍‍‍	6	–	2	–	0	.750	9	–	5	–	1	.633
New Mexico ‍‍‍	5	–	2	–	1	.688	8	–	4	–	3	.633
Wyoming ‍‍‍	4	–	3	–	1	.563	11	–	5	–	1	.676
Grand Canyon ‍‍‍	4	–	3	–	1	.563	8	–	5	–	4	.588
UC Davis ‍‍‍	3	–	4	–	1	.438	5	–	9	–	3	.382
UNLV ‍‍‍	3	–	5	–	1	.389	5	–	9	–	3	.382
UTEP ‍‍‍	2	–	6	–	0	.250	8	–	6	–	3	.559
Nevada ‍‍‍	1	–	6	–	1	.188	4	–	12	–	1	.265
San Jose St ‍‍‍	1	–	7	–	1	.167	2	–	11	–	3	.219
† – Conference champion ‡ – 2026 MW Tournament champion y – Invited to the NCAA Tournament; As of October 29, 2026; Rankings from United Soccer Coaches Poll; Source:Mountain West Conference

2026 Northeast Conference women's soccer standings
	Conf.						Overall
Team	W		L		T	PCT	W		L		T	PCT
FDU ‍‍‍	7	–	0	–	1	.938	9	–	2	–	4	.733
Central Connecticut ‍‍‍	6	–	1	–	1	.813	8	–	6	–	1	.567
Stonehill ‍‍‍	6	–	2	–	0	.750	6	–	6	–	4	.500
Wagner ‍‍‍	5	–	3	–	0	.625	6	–	8	–	2	.438
Le Moyne ‍‍‍	4	–	3	–	1	.563	5	–	11	–	1	.324
Mercyhurst ^{#} ‍‍‍	4	–	4	–	1	.500	5	–	11	–	1	.324
LIU ‍‍‍	3	–	3	–	2	.500	3	–	9	–	3	.300
Howard ‍‍‍	2	–	4	–	2	.375	2	–	8	–	4	.286
New Haven ^{#} ‍‍‍	2	–	4	–	2	.375	3	–	10	–	3	.281
Chicago State ‍‍‍	1	–	8	–	0	.111	1	–	15	–	0	.063
Delaware State ‍‍‍	0	–	8	–	0	.000	1	–	12	–	0	.077
† – Conference champion ‡ – 2026 NEC Tournament champion y – Invited to the NCAA Tournament^{#} – Ineligible for post-season (In transition); As of October 29, 2026; Rankings from United Soccer Coaches Poll; Source:Northeast Conference

2026 Ohio Valley Conference women's soccer standings
	Conf.						Overall
Team	W		L		T	PCT	W		L		T	PCT
Lindenwood ‍‍‍	4	–	2	–	0	.667	8	–	6	–	2	.563
Eastern Illinois ‍‍‍	4	–	2	–	0	.667	6	–	6	–	3	.500
UT Martin ‍‍‍	3	–	1	–	2	.667	5	–	5	–	7	.500
SIUE ‍‍‍	3	–	2	–	1	.583	5	–	5	–	4	.500
SEMO ‍‍‍	3	–	2	–	1	.583	4	–	8	–	4	.375
Southern Indiana ‍‍‍	1	–	2	–	3	.417	2	–	9	–	6	.294
Morehead St. ‍‍‍	1	–	4	–	1	.250	6	–	10	–	1	.382
Western Illinois ‍‍‍	1	–	5	–	0	.167	2	–	15	–	0	.118
† – Conference champion ‡ – 2026 OVC Tournament champion y – Invited to the NCAA Tournament; As of October 29, 2026; Rankings from United Soccer Coaches Poll; Source:Ohio Valley Conference

2026 Pac-12 Conference women's soccer standings
	Conf.						Overall
Team	W		L		T	PCT	W		L		T	PCT
No. 25 Utah State ‍‍‍	4	–	1	–	1	.750	11	–	3	–	3	.735
Boise State ‍‍‍	4	–	1	–	1	.750	12	–	2	–	2	.813
San Diego State ‍‍‍	3	–	1	–	2	.667	9	–	3	–	3	.700
Gonzaga ‍‍‍	3	–	3	–	0	.500	8	–	7	–	2	.529
Oregon State ‍‍‍	2	–	2	–	2	.500	3	–	10	–	4	.294
Washington State ‍‍‍	2	–	2	–	2	.500	5	–	5	–	5	.500
Texas State ‍‍‍	2	–	2	–	2	.500	9	–	3	–	4	.688
Colorado State ‍‍‍	2	–	4	–	1	.357	3	–	11	–	3	.265
Oregon ‍‍‍	0	–	6	–	1	.071	1	–	14	–	3	.139
† – Conference champion y – Invited to the NCAA Tournament; As of October 29, 2026; Rankings from United Soccer Coaches Poll; Source: Pac 12

2026 Patriot League women's soccer standings
	Conf.						Overall
Team	W		L		T	PCT	W		L		T	PCT
Army West Point ‍‍‍	6	–	0	–	1	.929	9	–	6	–	1	.594
Navy ‍‍‍	5	–	1	–	1	.786	12	–	4	–	2	.722
Loyola (MD) ‍‍‍	3	–	1	–	3	.643	3	–	2	–	10	.533
Holy Cross ‍‍‍	3	–	2	–	2	.571	7	–	6	–	3	.531
Bucknell ‍‍‍	3	–	2	–	2	.571	6	–	7	–	3	.469
Lafayette ‍‍‍	3	–	3	–	1	.500	4	–	6	–	5	.433
Boston U ‍‍‍	3	–	3	–	1	.500	6	–	8	–	2	.438
Colgate ‍‍‍	1	–	5	–	1	.214	2	–	11	–	3	.219
American ‍‍‍	0	–	5	–	2	.143	0	–	11	–	4	.133
Lehigh ‍‍‍	0	–	5	–	2	.143	0	–	11	–	3	.107
† – Conference champion ‡ – 2026 Patriot League Tournament champion y – Invited to the NCAA Tournament; As of October 29, 2026; Rankings from United Soccer Coaches Poll; Source:Patriot League

2026 SEC women's soccer standings
	Conf.						Overall
Team	W		L		T	PCT	W		L		T	PCT
No. 1 Vanderbilt ‍‍‍	8	–	0	–	1	.944	15	–	0	–	1	.969
No. 10 South Carolina ‍‍‍	6	–	0	–	3	.833	12	–	1	–	3	.844
No. t-6 Alabama ‍‍‍	7	–	2	–	0	.778	14	–	3	–	0	.824
No. 20 Arkansas ‍‍‍	5	–	1	–	3	.722	7	–	4	–	4	.600
Oklahoma ‍‍‍	5	–	4	–	0	.556	11	–	4	–	2	.706
No. 24 Auburn ‍‍‍	4	–	2	–	3	.611	8	–	2	–	6	.688
Kentucky ‍‍‍	4	–	2	–	3	.611	8	–	5	–	3	.594
Mississippi St. ‍‍‍	2	–	1	–	6	.556	8	–	2	–	6	.688
Texas ‍‍‍	3	–	3	–	3	.500	8	–	4	–	4	.625
Georgia ‍‍‍	3	–	3	–	3	.500	6	–	5	–	5	.531
Florida ‍‍‍	2	–	4	–	3	.389	6	–	6	–	4	.500
LSU ‍‍‍	2	–	4	–	3	.389	4	–	9	–	4	.353
Missouri ‍‍‍	2	–	6	–	1	.278	5	–	9	–	2	.375
Tennessee ‍‍‍	1	–	5	–	3	.278	6	–	5	–	4	.533
Texas A&M ‍‍‍	0	–	8	–	1	.056	4	–	11	–	1	.281
Ole Miss ‍‍‍	0	–	9	–	0	.000	7	–	10	–	0	.412
† – Conference champion ‡ – 2026 SEC Tournament champion y – Invited to the NCAA Tournament; As of October 29, 2026; Rankings from United Soccer Coaches Poll; Source: SEC

2026 Southern Conference women's soccer standings
	Conf.						Overall
Team	W		L		T	PCT	W		L		T	PCT
Samford ‍‍‍	7	–	0	–	2	.889	10	–	2	–	5	.735
Furman ‍‍‍	7	–	0	–	2	.889	12	–	3	–	3	.750
Chattanooga ‍‍‍	5	–	2	–	2	.667	9	–	3	–	5	.676
Tennessee Tech ‍‍‍	5	–	3	–	2	.600	8	–	7	–	4	.526
ETSU ‍‍‍	5	–	3	–	1	.611	8	–	6	–	2	.563
UNC Greensboro ‍‍‍	3	–	3	–	3	.500	7	–	6	–	4	.529
The Citadel ‍‍‍	3	–	4	–	2	.444	8	–	5	–	4	.588
Western Carolina ‍‍‍	2	–	5	–	2	.333	4	–	10	–	3	.324
Mercer ‍‍‍	2	–	5	–	2	.333	7	–	8	–	3	.472
Wofford ‍‍‍	1	–	6	–	2	.222	4	–	9	–	3	.344
VMI ‍‍‍	0	–	9	–	0	.000	0	–	17	–	1	.028
† – Conference champion ‡ – 2026 SoCon Tournament champion y – Invited to the NCAA Tournament; As of October 29, 2026; Rankings from United Soccer Coaches Poll; Source:SoCon

2026 Southland Conference women's soccer standings
	Conf.						Overall
Team	W		L		T	PCT	W		L		T	PCT
Lamar ‍‍‍	6	–	1	–	1	.813	9	–	2	–	4	.733
Houston Christian ‍‍‍	4	–	0	–	4	.750	8	–	3	–	6	.647
Incarnate Word ‍‍‍	5	–	2	–	1	.688	8	–	6	–	3	.559
Northwestern St ‍‍‍	5	–	3	–	0	.625	8	–	8	–	0	.500
SE Louisiana ‍‍‍	4	–	4	–	1	.500	8	–	7	–	2	.529
McNeese ‍‍‍	3	–	2	–	3	.563	8	–	6	–	3	.559
Nicholls ‍‍‍	3	–	2	–	3	.563	5	–	5	–	6	.500
East Texas A&M ‍‍‍	2	–	3	–	3	.438	3	–	7	–	6	.375
Stephen F. Austin ‍‍‍	2	–	6	–	0	.250	5	–	12	–	0	.294
Texas A&M-CC ‍‍‍	1	–	6	–	2	.222	4	–	9	–	4	.353
UT Rio Grande Valley ‍‍‍	0	–	6	–	2	.125	4	–	10	–	2	.313
† – Conference champion ‡ – 2026 Southland Tournament champion y – Invited to the NCAA Tournament; As of October 29, 2026; Rankings from United Soccer Coaches Poll; Source:Southland Conference

2026 Summit League women's soccer standings
	Conf.						Overall
Team	W		L		T	PCT	W		L		T	PCT
Oral Roberts ‍†‍‍	6	–	0	–	2	.875	12	–	1	–	4	.824
South Dakota State ‍‍‍	4	–	2	–	2	.625	9	–	4	–	3	.656
South Dakota ‍‍‍	3	–	2	–	3	.563	6	–	5	–	5	.531
Omaha ‍‍‍	3	–	3	–	2	.500	4	–	7	–	5	.406
North Dakota State ‍‍‍	3	–	3	–	2	.500	5	–	6	–	6	.471
St. Thomas ‍‍‍	3	–	5	–	0	.375	4	–	10	–	1	.300
North Dakota ‍‍‍	2	–	5	–	1	.313	5	–	8	–	2	.400
Kansas City ‍‍‍	1	–	5	–	2	.250	2	–	11	–	3	.219
† – Conference champion ‡ – Summit League tournament champion y – Invited to the NCAA tournament As of October 25, 2026; Rankings from United Soccer Coaches Poll; Source: Summit League

2025 Sun Belt Conference women's soccer standings
	Conf.						Overall
Team	W		L		T	PCT	W		L		T	PCT
James Madison ‍‍‍	7	–	1	–	1	.833	9	–	5	–	2	.625
Old Dominion ‍‍‍	6	–	1	–	2	.778	8	–	6	–	2	.563
Appalachian State ‍‍‍	5	–	2	–	2	.667	10	–	3	–	4	.706
Georgia State ‍‍‍	5	–	2	–	2	.667	10	–	4	–	3	.676
Louisiana ‍‍‍	4	–	3	–	2	.556	10	–	5	–	3	.639
South Alabama ‍‍‍	4	–	3	–	2	.556	6	–	7	–	3	.469
Marshall ‍‍‍	3	–	3	–	3	.500	7	–	5	–	5	.559
Troy ‍‍‍	3	–	4	–	2	.444	4	–	9	–	4	.353
Southern Miss ‍‍‍	3	–	4	–	2	.444	6	–	6	–	4	.500
Georgia Southern ‍‍‍	3	–	4	–	2	.444	8	–	5	–	4	.588
Coastal Carolina ‍‍‍	2	–	5	–	2	.333	8	–	7	–	3	.528
Louisiana Tech ‍‍‍	2	–	6	–	1	.278	4	–	11	–	2	.294
UL Monroe ‍‍‍	2	–	6	–	1	.278	5	–	11	–	2	.333
Arkansas State ‍‍‍	1	–	6	–	2	.222	3	–	8	–	4	.333
† – Conference champion ‡ – 2026 Sun Belt Tournament champion y – Invited to the NCAA Tournament; As of October 29, 2026; Rankings from United Soccer Coaches Poll; Source:Sun Belt

2026 SWAC women's soccer standings
	Conf.						Overall
Team	W		L		T	PCT	W		L		T	PCT
Jackson State ‍‍‍	4	–	0	–	2	.833	7	–	6	–	2	.533
Alabama A&M ‍‍‍	4	–	1	–	1	.750	6	–	5	–	3	.536
Grambling State ‍‍‍	3	–	1	–	2	.667	4	–	8	–	3	.367
Texas Southern ‍‍‍	3	–	2	–	2	.571	4	–	10	–	3	.324
Alcorn State ‍‍‍	2	–	0	–	4	.667	5	–	4	–	5	.536
Southern ‍‍‍	2	–	2	–	2	.500	3	–	8	–	3	.321
Alabama State ‍‍‍	2	–	3	–	2	.429	2	–	10	–	3	.233
Prairie View A&M ‍‍‍	0	–	5	–	1	.083	2	–	12	–	2	.188
UAPB ‍‍‍	0	–	6	–	0	.000	1	–	12	–	0	.077
† – Conference champion ‡ – 2026 SWAC Tournament champion y – Invited to the NCAA Tournament; As of October 29, 2026; Rankings from United Soccer Coaches Poll; Source: SWAC

2026 UAC women's soccer standings
	Conf.						Overall
Team	W		L		T	PCT	W		L		T	PCT
Blue
Eastern Kentucky ‍‍‍	5	–	2	–	2	.667	9	–	6	–	3	.583
North Alabama ‍‍‍	3	–	3	–	3	.500	6	–	4	–	6	.563
Austin Peay ‍‍‍	1	–	6	–	2	.222	2	–	13	–	3	.194
West Georgia ^{#} ‍‍‍	0	–	8	–	1	.056	0	–	13	–	3	.094
Red
Tarleton State ‍‍‍	5	–	1	–	3	.722	7	–	3	–	8	.611
Abilene Christian ‍‍‍	4	–	0	–	5	.722	7	–	2	–	8	.647
Central Arkansas ‍‍‍	4	–	2	–	3	.611	7	–	6	–	5	.528
Little Rock ‍‍‍	2	–	2	–	5	.500	4	–	6	–	6	.438
† – Conference champion ‡ – 2026 UAC Tournament champion y – Invited to the NCAA Tournament^{#} – Ineligible for post-season (In transition); As of October 29, 2026; Rankings from United Soccer Coaches Poll; Source:UAC

2026 West Coast Conference women's soccer standings
	Conf.						Overall
Team	W		L		T	PCT	W		L		T	PCT
Loyola Marymount ‍‍‍	5	–	0	–	2	.857	6	–	5	–	4	.533
Pepperdine ‍‍‍	5	–	1	–	1	.786	9	–	4	–	3	.656
Seattle ‍‍‍	4	–	1	–	2	.714	10	–	4	–	4	.667
Santa Clara ‍‍‍	3	–	0	–	4	.714	7	–	2	–	8	.647
Saint Mary's ‍‍‍	4	–	2	–	1	.643	10	–	2	–	5	.735
San Diego ‍‍‍	2	–	4	–	1	.357	5	–	8	–	3	.406
Denver ‍‍‍	2	–	4	–	1	.357	3	–	9	–	3	.300
Portland ‍‍‍	1	–	4	–	2	.286	5	–	9	–	2	.375
San Francisco ‍‍‍	0	–	5	–	2	.143	3	–	8	–	3	.321
Pacific ‍‍‍	0	–	5	–	2	.143	1	–	13	–	2	.125
† – Conference champion y – Invited to the NCAA Tournament; As of October 29, 2026; Rankings from United Soccer Coaches Poll; Source:West Coast Conference

2026 NCAA Division I independents women's soccer records
	Conf.						Overall
Team	W		L		T	PCT	W		L		T	PCT
South Carolina State ‍‍‍	0	–	0	–	0	–	1	–	14	–	1	.094
y – Invited to the NCAA Tournament; As of October 29, 2026; Rankings from United Soccer Coaches Poll

== See also ==
- 2026 NCAA Division I men's soccer season
