= Bella Devey =

American soccer player (born 2007)

- Devey with North Carolina in 2026

Personal information
- Full name: Isabelle Amelie Devey
- Date of birth: April 23, 2007 (age 19)
- Height: 5 ft 7 in (1.70 m)
- Positions: Forward; midfielder

Team information
- Current team: North Carolina Tar Heels
- Number: 10

Youth career
- La Roca FC
- 2021–2024: Lone Peak Knights
- 2022–2025: Utah Avalanche

College career
| Years | Team | Apps | (Gls) |
| 2025– | North Carolina Tar Heels | 39 | (23) |

International career
| 2026– | United States U-19 | | |

Isabelle Amelie Devey (born April 23, 2007) is an American college soccer player who plays as a forward for the North Carolina Tar Heels. She was named ACC Offensive Player of the Year in 2026.

== Early life ==
Devey grew up in Draper, Utah, the daughter of Danae and Jeff Devey, and has two older brothers. She played high school soccer all four years at Lone Peak High School, recording 50 goals and 36 assists in her career and being named first-team all-state three times. She led Lone Peak with 14 goals and added 11 assists as a sophomore in 2022, leading the team to an 18–1 record and the UHSAA 6A state semifinals.

Devey scored 11 goals and added 12 assists for Lone Peak as a junior in 2023, leading the team to a 20–1 record and the 6A state championship, where she had a goal and two assists in the final. She was named the Utah Gatorade Player of the Year and Deseret News Ms. Soccer at the end of her junior year. She scored 18 goals and added 13 assists in her senior year in 2024, leading Lone Peak to a perfect 20–0 record and their second straight state title, and was named the Deseret News 6A Player of the Year.

Devey played club soccer for La Roca FC and Utah Avalanche, receiving ECNL all-conference honors with both sides. She committed to play college soccer for the North Carolina Tar Heels during her junior year. Before college, she led the US Women–sponsored team to the US$1 million prize at the Soccer Tournament 2025, being named the event's MVP.

== College career ==
Devey started all 21 games, scored 5 goals, and added 4 assists for the North Carolina Tar Heels as a freshman in 2025. She scored once in the NCAA tournament as the Tar Heels reached the third round. She played multiple positions over her freshman year, though mainly had defensive roles. She moved up to striker as a sophomore in 2026, rewarding the change with a prolific scoring campaign. In the ACC tournament, she scored in both the semifinals and final to lead North Carolina to their first such title since 2019, being named tournament MVP. She was named first-team All-ACC and the ACC Offensive Player of the Year, becoming the first Tar Heel to win the award since Alessia Russo in 2018.

== International career ==
Devey was an alternate for the United States under-17 squad that won the 2024 CONCACAF Women's U-17 Championship. She was called into United States national team development camp, training concurrently with the senior national team, in January 2026.

== Honors and awards ==
North Carolina Tar Heels

- Atlantic Coast Conference tournament: 2026

Individual

- ACC Offensive Player of the Year: 2026
- First-team All-ACC: 2026
- ACC tournament MVP: 2026
