= 2012 NCAA Division I women's soccer tournament =

2012 NCAA women's soccer tournament
Women's College Cup

Tournament details
- Country: United States
- Dates: November 9–December 2, 2012
- Teams: 64

Final positions
- Champions: North Carolina Tar Heels (21st title, 26th College Cup)
- Runners-up: Penn State Nittany Lions (1st title match, 4th College Cup)
- Semifinalists: Florida State Seminoles (6th College Cup); Stanford Cardinal (6th College Cup)

Tournament statistics
- Matches played: 63
- Goals scored: 180 (2.86 per match)
- Attendance: 67,281 (1,068 per match)
- Top goal scorer(s): Tiffany McCarty, FSU (7)

Awards
- Best player: Offensive–Kealia Ohai (UNC); Defensive–Satara Murray (UNC)

The 2012 NCAA Division I women's soccer tournament (also known as the 2012 Women's College Cup) was the 31st annual single-elimination tournament to determine the national champion of NCAA Division I women's collegiate soccer. The semifinals and championship game were played at Torero Stadium in San Diego, California from November 30–December 2, 2012 while the preceding rounds were played at various sites across the country from November 9–23.

North Carolina defeated Penn State in the final, 4–1, to win their twenty-first national title. The Tar Heels (15–5–3) were coached by Anson Dorrance.

The most outstanding offensive player was Kealia Ohai from North Carolina, and the most outstanding defensive player was Satara Murray, also from North Carolina. Murray and Ohai, alongside nine other players, were named to the All-Tournament team.

The tournament's leading scorer, with 7 goals and 1 assist, was Tiffany McCarty from Florida State.

== Qualification ==
All Division I women's soccer programs were eligible to qualify for the tournament. The tournament field remained fixed at 64 teams.

== Format ==
Just as before, the final two rounds, deemed the Women's College Cup, were played at a pre-determined neutral site. All other rounds were played on campus sites at the home field of the higher-seeded team although with a few exceptions. The first round was played exclusively on the home fields of higher-seeded teams (noted with an asterisk below). However, the second and third rounds were played on the home fields of the home fields of the two remaining teams in each bracket with the highest seed (generally the #1 and #2 seed in each bracket with a few noted exceptions). Those teams are also noted with asterisk. Finally, the quarterfinal round, or the championship match for each bracket, was played on the home field of the higher-seeded team, with no exceptions.

=== National seeds ===
| #1 Seeds | #2 Seeds | #3 Seeds | #4 Seeds |
|---|---|---|---|
| BYU (18–1–1); Florida State (16–3–0); Penn State (17–3–1); Stanford (17–1–1) | Florida (17–4–1); North Carolina (10–5–2); San Diego State (19–1–1); Virginia (16–4–1) | Baylor (17–1–4); Duke (12–5–2); UCLA (15–2–2); Wake Forest (13–5–3) | Marquette (16–2–2); Maryland (13–6–2); Ohio State (16–4–1); Portland (11–4–4) |

=== Teams ===
Stanford Regional
| Seed | School | Conference | Berth Type | Record |
|---|---|---|---|---|
| | Cal State Northridge | Big West | Automatic | 11-4-6 |
| | California | Pac-12 | At-large | 15-5 |
| | Colorado College | Conference USA | At-large | 14-3-5 |
| | Denver | WAC | At-large | 15-2-4 |
| | Idaho State | Big Sky | Automatic | 11-5-3 |
| | Kentucky | SEC | At-large | 13-6-1 |
| | Long Beach State | Big West | At-large | 12-7 |
| 4 | Maryland | ACC | At-large | 13-6-2 |
| | Pepperdine | West Coast | At-large | 14-6 |
| 2 | San Diego State | Mountain West | Automatic | 19-1-1 |
| | Santa Clara | West Coast | At-large | 11-3-6 |
| 1 | Stanford | Pac-12 | Automatic | 17-1-1 |
| | Stony Brook | America East | Automatic | 12-6-3 |
| 3 | UCLA | Pac-12 | At-large | 15-2-2 |
| | UT Martin | Ohio Valley | Automatic | 13-5-3 |
| | Wisconsin | Big Ten | At-large | 12-7-1 |

Penn State Regional
| Seed | School | Conference | Berth Type | Record |
|---|---|---|---|---|
| | Boston College | ACC | At-large | 10-7-3 |
| | Central Michigan | MAC | At-large | 15-6-1 |
| | Colgate | Patriot | Automatic | 11-5-4 |
| 3 | Duke | ACC | At-large | 12-5-2 |
| | Hofstra | CAA | Automatic | 11-8-2 |
| | La Salle | Atlantic 10 | Automatic | 17-4-1 |
| | LIU Brooklyn | Northeast | Automatic | 10-7-3 |
| | Loyola (MD) | MAAC | Automatic | 12-5-4 |
| | Miami (OH) | MAC | Automatic | 19-2-1 |
| | Michigan | Big Ten | At-large | 14-5-2 |
| 1 | Penn State | Big Ten | At-large | 17-3-1 |
| 4 | Portland | West Coast | At-large | 11-4-4 |
| | Rutgers | Big East | At-large | 12-7-1 |
| | Tennessee | SEC | At-large | 14-4-3 |
| 2 | Virginia | ACC | Automatic | 16-4-1 |
| | Washington State | Pac-12 | At-large | 12-6-1 |

BYU Regional
| Seed | School | Conference | Berth Type | Record |
|---|---|---|---|---|
| | Arizona State | Pac-12 | At-large | 10-8-2 |
| | Auburn | SEC | At-large | 12-10-1 |
| 3 | Baylor | Big 12 | Automatic | 17-1-4 |
| 1 | BYU | West Coast | Automatic | 18-1-1 |
| | Georgetown | Big East | At-large | 15-3-3 |
| | Illinois | Big Ten | At-large | 10-8-3 |
| | Illinois State | Missouri Valley | Automatic | 13-4-2 |
| 4 | Marquette | Big East | Automatic | 16-2-2 |
| | Missouri | SEC | At-large | 14-7 |
| 2 | North Carolina | ACC | At-large | 10-5-2 |
| | Princeton | Ivy League | Automatic | 13-3-1 |
| | Radford | Big South | Automatic | 14-2-4 |
| | Utah State | WAC | Automatic | 13-2-6 |
| | Virginia Tech | ACC | At-large | 13-5-1 |
| | Washington | Pac-12 | At-large | 10-7-3 |
| | West Virginia | Big 12 | At-large | 11-4-4 |

Florida State Regional
| Seed | School | Conference | Berth Type | Record |
|---|---|---|---|---|
| 2 | Florida | SEC | Automatic | 17-4-1 |
| | Florida Gulf Coast | Atlantic Sun | Automatic | 14-3-3 |
| 1 | Florida State | ACC | At-large | 16-3 |
| | Georgia Southern | Southern | Automatic | 10-7-5 |
| | Miami (FL) | ACC | At-large | 09-7-3 |
| | Milwaukee | Horizon | Automatic | 08-8-1 |
| | MVSU | SWAC | Automatic | 08-9-3 |
| | North Texas | Sun Belt | Automatic | 16-4-2 |
| | Notre Dame | Big East | At-large | 13-5-2 |
| | Oakland | Summit | Automatic | 11-5-3 |
| 4 | Ohio State | Big Ten | Automatic | 16-4-1 |
| | Stephen F. Austin | Southland | Automatic | 17-3 |
| | Texas A&M | SEC | At-large | 17-4-1 |
| | Texas Tech | Big 12 | At-large | 15-5-1 |
| | UCF | Conference USA | Automatic | 17-4-1 |
| 3 | Wake Forest | ACC | At-large | 13-5-3 |

== Bracket ==
=== Stanford Bracket ===
First round November 9–11; Campus Sites
1 | Stanford* | 3
Idaho State | 0
Santa Clara* | 2
Long Beach State | 1
Denver* | 3
Colorado College | 1
Stony Brook | 0
4 | Maryland* | 2
3 | UCLA* | 1
Wisconsin | 0
Tennessee–Martin | 0
Kentucky* | 1
Pepperdine* | 0
California | 1
Cal State Northridge | 0
San Diego State* | 3

Second round November 15–16; Regional Campus Sites
1 | Stanford* | 2
Santa Clara | 1
Denver | 3
4 | Maryland | 2
3 | UCLA | 5
Kentucky | 0
California | 1
2 | San Diego State* | 2

Round of 16; November 17–18; Regional Campus Sites
1 | Stanford* | 3
Denver | 0
3 | UCLA | 3
2 | San Diego State* | 0

Quarterfinals; November 23; Campus Sites
1 | Stanford* | 2
3 | UCLA | 1

=== BYU Bracket ===
First round November 9–11; Campus Sites
2 | North Carolina* | 2
Radford | 0
Illinois (2OT, PK) | 1(3)
Missouri* | 1(0)
Georgetown | 3
Virginia Tech* | 2
Arizona State | 1
3 | Baylor* | 3
4 | Marquette* | 3
Illinois State | 0
Princeton | 2
West Virginia* | 1
Auburn | 2
Washington* | 1
Utah State | 1
1 | BYU* | 2

Second round November 15–16; Regional Campus Sites
2 | North Carolina* | 9
Illinois | 2
Georgetown | 1
3 | Baylor | 2
4 | Marquette | 3
Princeton | 1
Auburn | 0
1 | BYU* | 1

Round of 16; November 17–18; Regional Campus Sites
2 | North Carolina* (2OT, PK) | 1(4)
3 | Baylor | 1(2)
4 | Marquette | 0 (5)
1 | BYU* (2OT, PK) | 0 (6)

Quarterfinals; November 23; Campus Sites
2 | North Carolina | 2
1 | BYU* | 1

=== Penn State Bracket ===
First round November 9–11; Campus Sites
1 | Penn State* | 4
Long Island–Brooklyn | 0
Hofstra | 0
Boston College* | 2
Michigan* | 2
Central Michigan | 1
Washington State | 2(5)
4 | Portland* (2OT, PK) | 2(6)
3 | Duke* | 6
Loyola–Maryland | 0
Miami (OH) | 3
Tennessee* | 2
Colgate* | 0
Rutgers | 1
La Salle | 1
2 | Virginia* | 4

Second round November 15–16; Regional Campus Sites
1 | Penn State* | 5
Boston College | 2
Michigan | 3
4 | Portland | 0
3 | Duke | 4
Miami (OH) | 1
Rutgers | 1
2 | Virginia* | 6

Round of 16; November 17–18; Regional Campus Sites
1 | Penn State* (2OT, PK) | 1(3)
Michigan | 1(2)
3 | Duke | 3
2 | Virginia* | 1

Quarterfinals; November 23; Campus Sites
1 | Penn State* | 1
3 | Duke | 0

=== Florida State Bracket ===
First round November 9–11; Campus Sites
2 | Florida* | 2
Florida Gulf Coast | 0
Miami (FL) | 1(3)
UCF* (2OT, PK) | 1(5)
Notre Dame* | 3
Milwaukee | 1
Georgia Southern | 0
3 | Wake Forest* | 4
4 | Ohio State* | 1(1)
Oakland (2OT, PK) | 1(3)
Stephen F. Austin | 0
Texas A&M* | 1
Texas Tech* | 2
North Texas | 0
Mississippi Valley State | 0
1 | Florida State* | 6

Second round November 15–16; Regional Campus Sites
2 | Florida* | 1
UCF | 0
Notre Dame | 2
3 | Wake Forest | 1
Oakland | 0
Texas A&M | 3
Texas Tech | 2
1 | Florida State* (OT) | 3

Round of 16; November 17–18; Regional Campus Sites
2 | Florida* | 0
Notre Dame | 2
Texas A&M | 0
1 | Florida State* | 4

Quarterfinals; November 23; Campus Sites
Notre Dame | 0
1 | Florida State* | 1

=== College Cup ===
Semifinals; November 30; Torero Stadium; San Diego, California
1 | Stanford | 0
2 | North Carolina (2OT) | 1
1 | Penn State (OT) | 2
1 | Florida State | 1

Championship; December 2 Torero Stadium; San Diego, California
2 | North Carolina | 4
1 | Penn State | 1

== All-tournament team ==
- Kealia Ohai, North Carolina (most outstanding offensive player)
- Satara Murray, North Carolina (most outstanding defensive player)
- Amber Brooks, North Carolina
- Crystal Dunn, North Carolina
- Adelaide Gay, North Carolina
- Maddy Evans, Penn State
- Maya Hayes, Penn State
- Christine Nairn, Penn State
- Taylor Schram, Penn State
- Emily Oliver, Stanford
- Tiffany McCarty, Florida State

== Attendances ==
| Team | Home average |
|---|---|
| Portland | 3,313 |
| BYU | 3,257 |
| Texas A&M | 2,304 |
| New Mexico | 1,781 |
| Penn St. | 1,601 |
| Stanford | 1,576 |
| Georgia | 1,514 |
| TCU | 1,413 |
| North Carolina | 1,399 |
| Florida St. | 1,221 |
| Utah | 1,208 |
| Virginia | 1,172 |
| UCLA | 1,152 |
| Notre Dame | 1,118 |
| Maryland | 1,083 |
| Tennessee | 1,080 |
| Washington | 1,054 |
| Florida | 1,051 |
| Texas Tech | 1,027 |
| Colorado | 986 |
| Texas | 962 |
| Louisville | 949 |
| West Virginia | 943 |
| Connecticut | 920 |
| Duke | 905 |
| Dayton | 896 |
| Santa Clara | 875 |
| Kentucky | 873 |
| Auburn | 860 |
| Hawai'i | 856 |
| LSU | 847 |
| Oklahoma St. | 843 |
| Arkansas | 841 |
| Kennesaw St. | 840 |
| Minnesota | 830 |
| Alabama | 799 |
| Ole Miss | 796 |
| Oregon | 759 |
| Oklahoma | 748 |
| Charlotte | 740 |
| Iowa St. | 730 |
| San Diego St. | 722 |
| Missouri | 722 |
| South Carolina | 717 |
| Idaho St. | 715 |
| Vanderbilt | 713 |
| Michigan | 708 |
| California | 700 |
| Long Beach St. | 698 |
| Northern Arizona | 697 |
| Memphis | 678 |
| Fresno St. | 678 |
| Wake Forest | 678 |
| Arizona St. | 674 |
| Rutgers | 667 |
| Utah St. | 657 |
| Cincinnati | 656 |
| Cal St. Fullerton | 650 |
| Marist | 650 |
| Virginia Tech | 642 |
| Dartmouth | 627 |
| North Carolina St. | 625 |
| South Florida | 617 |
| Michigan St. | 602 |
| Southern California | 601 |
| George Mason | 599 |
| Furman | 599 |
| Utah Valley | 585 |
| Gonzaga | 583 |
| Denver | 580 |
| UC Irvine | 570 |
| Arizona | 567 |
| Wisconsin | 565 |
| Ohio St. | 562 |
| Washington St. | 560 |

== See also ==
- NCAA Women's Soccer Championships (Division II, Division III)
- NCAA Men's Soccer Championships (Division I, Division II, Division III)
