= NCAA Division I Women's Soccer Tournament Most Outstanding Player =

Women's college soccer award

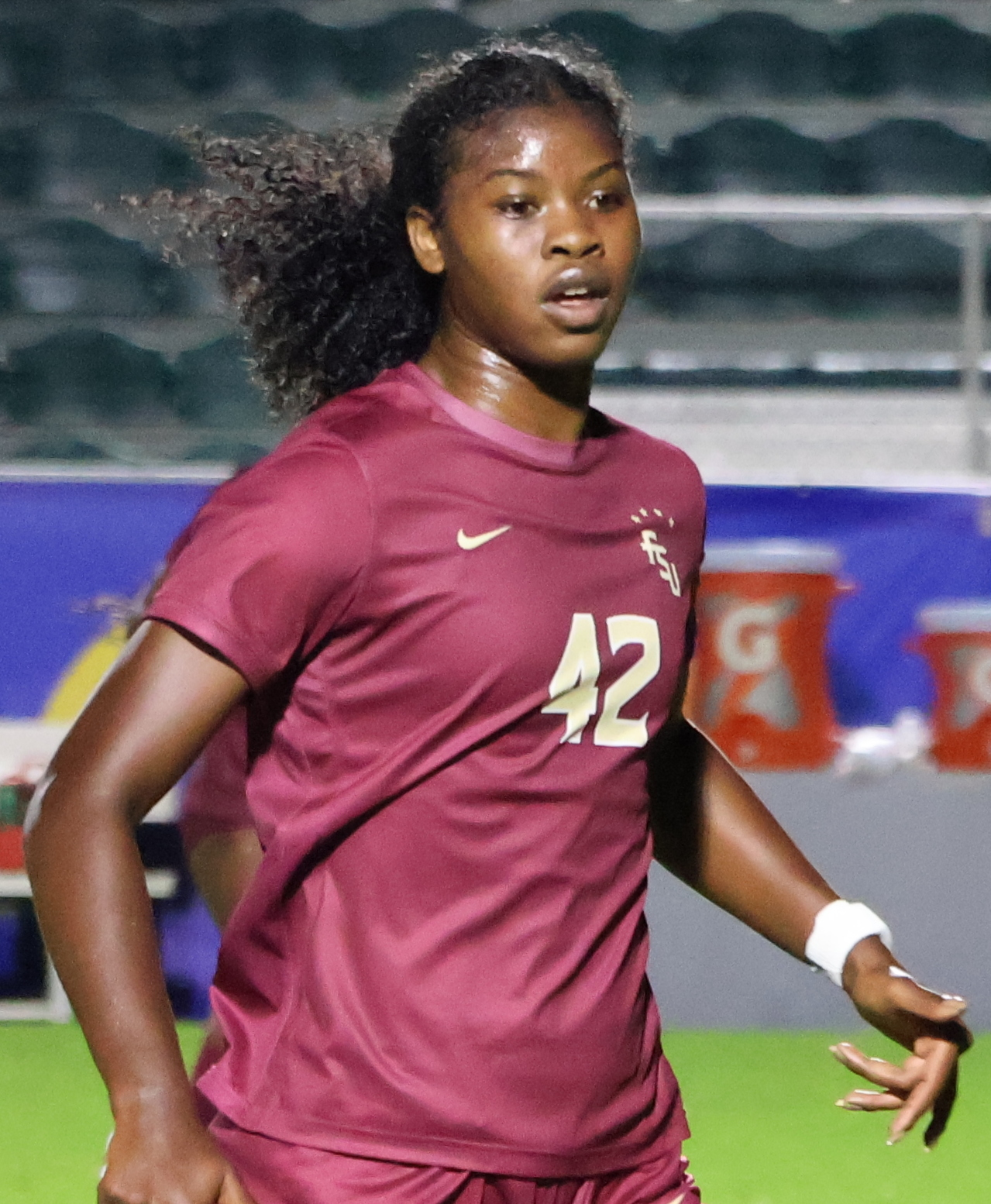
Wrianna Hudson, Most Outstanding Offensive Player, Florida State, 2025

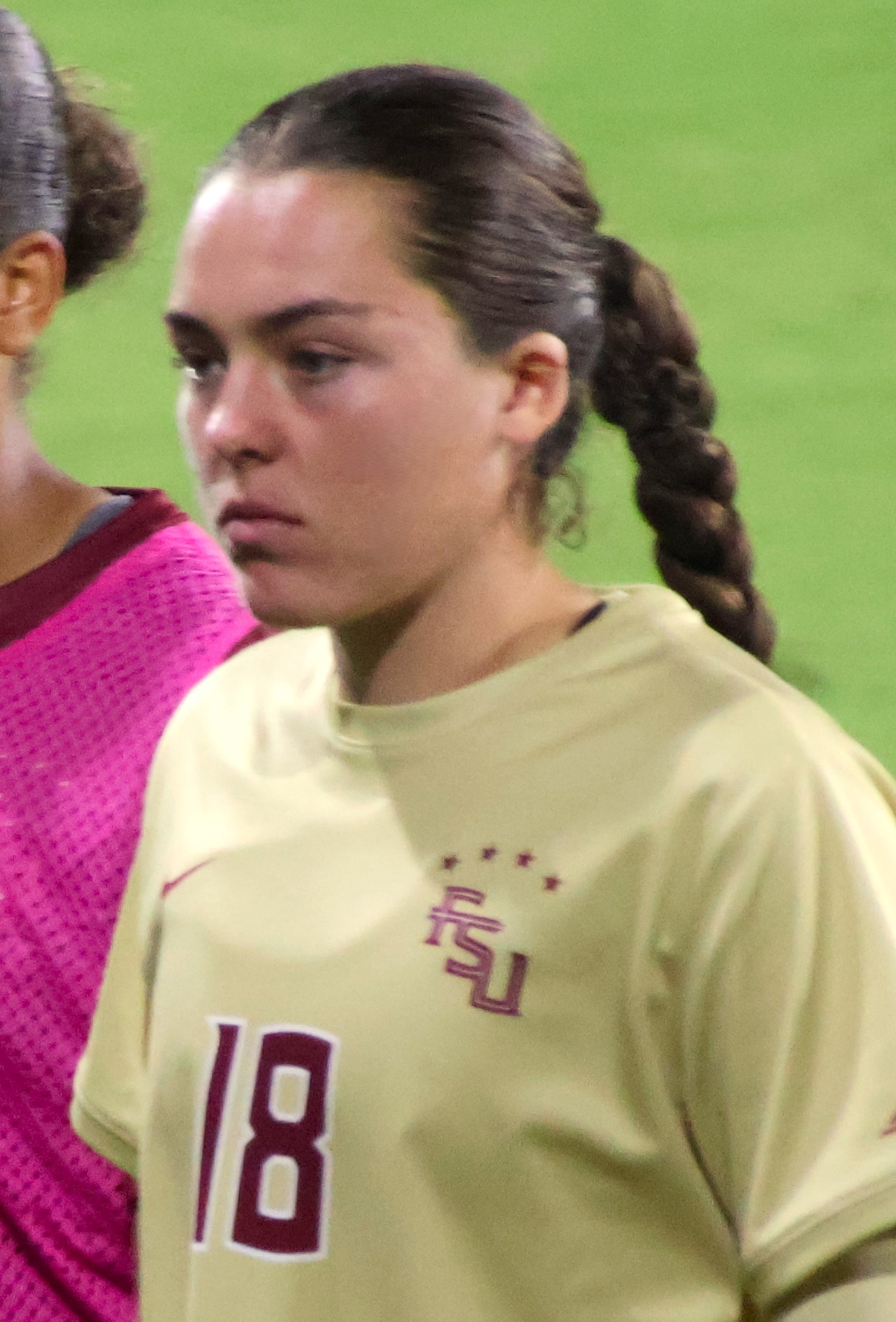
Kate Ockene, Most Outstanding Defensive Player, Florida State, 2025

The Most Outstanding Offensive Player and Most Outstanding Defensive Player awards are presented annually to the best players in the NCAA Division I women's soccer tournament (also known as the Women's College Cup). The Most Outstanding Overall Player was also awarded in the tournament's early years. These individual honors are usually, but not always, awarded to players on the winning team.

== Winners ==
Most Outstanding Overall Players
Year	Player	Position	Team	Ref.
1983	Christine Taggart	Forward	UMass (Note: Team did not win the tournament.)	
1984	April Heinrichs	Forward	North Carolina	
1985	Pam Baughman	Forward	George Mason	
1986	April Heinrichs (2)	Forward	North Carolina	

Most Outstanding Offensive and Defensive Players
Year	Offensive Player	Position	Team	Defensive Player	Position	Team	Ref.
1982	Mary Varas	Midfielder	Central Florida	Linda Gancitano	Defender	Central Florida	
1983	Lisa Gmitter	Forward	George Mason	Suzy Cobb	Defender	North Carolina	
1984	Amy Machin	Forward	North Carolina	Shelley McElroy	Defender	UConn	
1985	Not awarded			Betsy Drambour	Defender	George Mason	
1986	Not awarded						
1987	Michelle Akers	Midfielder	Central Florida	Debbie Belkin	Defender	UMass	
1988	Shannon Higgins	Midfielder	North Carolina	Carla Werden	Defender	North Carolina	
1989	Kristine Lilly	Forward	North Carolina	Tracey Bates	Defender	North Carolina	
1990	Kristine Lilly (2)	Forward	North Carolina	Stacey Blazo	Defender	North Carolina	
1991	Pam Kalinoski	Forward	North Carolina	Tisha Venturini	Midfielder	North Carolina	
1992	Mia Hamm	Forward	North Carolina	Sue Wall	Goalkeeper	Santa Clara	
1993	Mia Hamm (2)	Forward	North Carolina	Skye Eddy	Defender	George Mason	
1994	Tisha Venturini (2)	Midfielder	North Carolina	Staci Wilson	Defender	North Carolina	
1995	Cindy Daws	Midfielder	Notre Dame	Kate Sobrero	Defender	Notre Dame	
1996	Debbie Keller	Forward	North Carolina	Nel Fettig	Defender	North Carolina	
1997	Robin Confer	Forward	North Carolina	Siri Mullinix	Goalkeeper	North Carolina	
1998	Danielle Fotopoulos	Forward	Florida	Meredith Flaherty	Goalkeeper	Florida	
1999	Susan Bush	Forward	North Carolina	Lorrie Fair	Defender	North Carolina	
2000	Meredith Florance	Forward	North Carolina	Catherine Reddick	Defender	North Carolina	
2001	Aly Wagner	Midfielder	Santa Clara	Danielle Slaton	Defender	Santa Clara	
2002	Christine Sinclair	Forward	Portland	Jessica Ballweg	Defender	Santa Clara	
2003	Heather O'Reilly	Forward	North Carolina	Catherine Reddick (2)	Defender	North Carolina	
2004	Katie Thorlakson	Forward	Notre Dame	Erika Bohn	Goalkeeper	Notre Dame	
2005	Megan Rapinoe	Forward	Portland	Cori Alexander	Goalkeeper	Portland	
2006	Heather O'Reilly (2)	Forward	North Carolina	Robyn Gayle	Defender	North Carolina	
2007	Amy Rodriguez	Forward	USC	Kristin Olsen	Goalkeeper	USC	
2008	Casey Nogueira	Forward	North Carolina	Carrie Dew	Defender	Notre Dame	
2009	Casey Nogueira (2)	Forward	North Carolina	Whitney Engen	Defender	North Carolina	
2010	Melissa Henderson	Forward	Notre Dame	Jessica Schuveiller	Defender	Notre Dame	
2011	Teresa Noyola	Midfielder	Stanford	Emily Oliver	Goalkeeper	Stanford	
2012	Kealia Ohai	Forward	North Carolina	Satara Murray	Defender	North Carolina	
2013	Jamia Fields	Forward	Florida State	Ally Courtnall	Defender	UCLA	
2014	Cheyna Williams	Forward	Florida State	Emily Sonnett	Defender	Virginia	
2015	Rocky Rodríguez	Midfielder	Penn State	EJ Proctor	Goalkeeper	Duke	
2016	Katie Johnson	Forward	USC	Kadeisha Buchanan	Defender	West Virginia	
2017	Jaye Boissiere	Midfielder	Stanford	Tierna Davidson	Defender	Stanford	
2018	Dallas Dorosy	Midfielder	Florida State	Jaelin Howell	Midfielder	Florida State	
2019	Sophia Smith	Forward	Stanford	Naomi Girma	Defender	Stanford	
2020	Kelsey Turnbow	Forward	Santa Clara	Alex Loera	Defender	Santa Clara	
2021	Zhao Yujie	Midfielder	Florida State	Cristina Roque	Goalkeeper	Florida State	
2022	Reilyn Turner	Forward	UCLA	Lilly Reale	Defender	UCLA	
2023	Jordynn Dudley	Forward	Florida State	Lauren Flynn	Defender	Florida State	
2024	Olivia Thomas	Forward	North Carolina	Clare Gagne	Goalkeeper	North Carolina	
2025	Wrianna Hudson	Forward	Florida State	Kate Ockene	Goalkeeper	Florida State	
