= 1988 NCAA Division I women's soccer tournament =

1988 NCAA women's soccer tournament
Women's College Cup (semifinals & final)

Tournament details
- Country: United States
- Dates: November–December 1988
- Teams: 12

Final positions
- Champions: North Carolina Tar Heels (6th title, 7th College Cup)
- Runners-up: NC State Wolfpack (1st title match, 1st College Cup)
- Semifinalists: California Golden Bears (3rd College Cup); Wisconsin Badgers (1st College Cup)

Tournament statistics
- Matches played: 11
- Goals scored: 25 (2.27 per match)
- Attendance: 6,280 (571 per match)
- Top goal scorer(s): Shannon Higgins, UNC (4)

Awards
- Best player: Shannon Higgins, UNC (Offensive); Carla Werden, UNC (Defensive)
- All statistics correct as of 4/30/2015.

The 1988 NCAA Division I women's soccer tournament was the seventh annual single-elimination tournament to determine the national champion of NCAA Division I women's collegiate soccer. This was the first championship for just Division I programs. The championship game was played again at Fetzer Field in Chapel Hill, North Carolina during December 1988.

North Carolina defeated rival NC State in the final, 4–1, to win their sixth national title. Coached by Anson Dorrance, the Tar Heels finished the season 18–0–3. This would go on to become the third of North Carolina's record nine consecutive national titles (1986–1994). It was also part of the Tar Heels' ten-year unbeaten streak that ran from the 1984 championship game all the way until the 1994 season.

The most outstanding offensive player was Shannon Higgins from North Carolina, and the most outstanding defensive player was Carla Werden, also from North Carolina. Higgins was also the tournament's leading scorer (4 goals, 1 assist).

== Qualification ==
After the establishment of the NCAA Division II Women's Soccer Championship in 1988, only Division I women's soccer programs were eligible to qualify for the tournament. Nonetheless, the tournament field remained fixed at 12 teams.

Team	Appearance	Previous	Record
California	5th	1987	14-4-2
Central Florida	4th	1987	09-2-2
Colorado College	5th	1987	14-2-1
Connecticut	7th	1987	15-4-2
George Mason	6th	1986	11-6-5
Massachusetts	7th	1987	14-2-1
North Carolina	7th	1987	15-0-3
NC State	4th	1987	17-1-3
St. Mary's (CA)	1st	None	12-7-2
Virginia	2nd	1987	12-5-3
William & Mary	5th	1987	15-3-2
Wisconsin	2nd	1985	13-2-2

== Bracket ==
First round
Central Florida	2
Virginia	1
Wisconsin (2OT, PK)	1
Connecticut	0
California	2
St. Mary's (CA)	0
George Mason	1
William & Mary	0

Second round
North Carolina	2
Central Florida	0
Massachusetts	1
Wisconsin	2
Colorado College	1
California (2OT)	2
NC State (2OT)	1
George Mason	0

Semifinals
North Carolina	3
Wisconsin	0
California	0
NC State	1

Championship (Women's College Cup); Chapel Hill, North Carolina
North Carolina	4
NC State	1

== See also ==
- NCAA Division I women's soccer championship
- NCAA Division II Women's Soccer Championship (began 1988)
- NCAA Division III Women's Soccer Championship
- 1988 NCAA Division I Men's Soccer Championship
