= 2023 NCAA Division I women's soccer championship game =

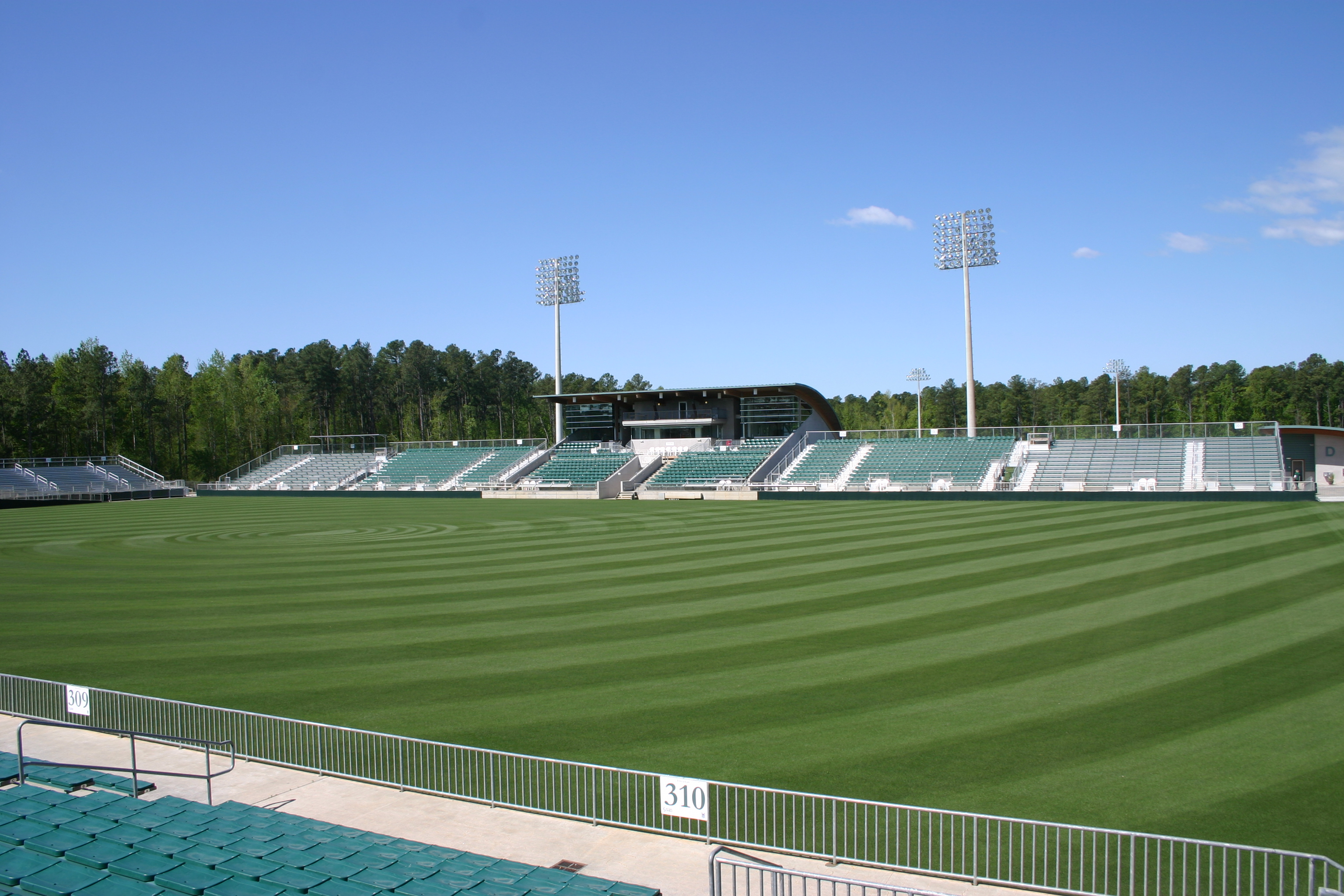
- WakeMed Soccer Park hosted the match
- Event: 2023 NCAA Division I women's soccer tournament
Florida State	Stanford
ACC	Pac-12
5	1
- Date: 4 December 2023
- Venue: WakeMed Soccer Park, Cary, NC
- Referee: Meghan Mullen
- Attendance: 3,954

The 2023 NCAA Division I women's soccer championship game (also known as the 2023 NCAA Division I Women's College Cup) was played on December 4, 2023, at WakeMed Soccer Park in Cary, North Carolina, and determined the winner of the 2023 NCAA Division I women's soccer tournament, the national collegiate women's soccer championship in the United States. This was the 42th. edition of this tournament organised by the NCAA.

The match featured Florida State University, which played its 7th. final, and Stanford University, which made its 6th. appearance in the final. Florida State defeated Stanford 5–1 to win their fourth NCAA women's soccer title in a 10-year run.

Florida State also finished the season undefeated with a 22–0–1 record, the first in program history. They joined the 2011 Stanford team (23–0). Florida also became the top scoring offense, having scored in 34 consecutive matches.

== Road to the final ==
The NCAA Division I women's soccer tournament, sometimes known as the College Cup, is an American intercollegiate soccer tournament conducted by the National Collegiate Athletic Association (NCAA), and determines the Division I women's national champion. The tournament has been formally held since 1982, when it was a twelve-team tournament.

Florida State (ACC)		Round	Stanford (Pac-12)	
Opponent	Result	NCAA Tournament	Opponent	Result
Morehead State (OVC)	5–0 (H)	First round	Pepperdine (WCC)	3–0 (H)
Texas A&M (SEC)	1–0 (H)	Second round	South Carolina (SEC)	3–0 (H)
Texas (Big 12)	5–0 (H)	Round of 16	Mississippi State (SEC)	1–0 (H)
Pittsburgh (ACC)	3–0 (H)	Quarterfinal	Nebraska (Big Ten)	2–1 (a.e.t.) (H)
Clemson (ACC)	2–0 (N)	College Cup	BYU (Big 12)	2–0 (N)

== Match details ==
2023 College Cup
4 December 2023
Final

Florida State	5–1	Stanford
Dudley 29' (pen.); Brown 29', 61'; Olsson 58'; Echegini 84'	Report	Doms 52'

WakeMed Soccer Park, Cary, NC
Attendance: 3,954
Referee: Meghan Mullen

Florida State
Stanford

GK	1	(Puerto Rico) Cristina Roque
DF	7	(Japan) Ran Iwai	(substituted off) 35' (substituted in) 45'
DF	20	(United States) Heather Gilchrist
DF	8	(United States) Lauren Flynn
DF	17	(Jamaica) Mimi Van Zanten	(substituted off) 69' (substituted in) 81'
MF	10	(Jamaica) Jody Brown	(substituted off) 33' (substituted in) 45' (substituted off) 65' (substituted in) 76'
MF	13	(Bermuda) Leilanni Nesbeth
DF	3	(United States) Taylor Huff	(substituted off) 76' (substituted in) 83'
FW	9	(Sweden) Beata Olsson	(substituted off) 33' (substituted in) 45' (substituted off) 65' (substituted off) 78'
FW	11	(United States) Jordynn Dudley	(substituted off) 33' (substituted in) 45' (substituted off) 65' (substituted in) 76' (substituted off) 86'
FW	6	(Nigeria) Onyi Echegini	(substituted off) 35' (substituted in) 45' (substituted off) 69' (substituted in) 81'
Substitutions:
FW	30	(United States) Leah Paris	(substituted in) 33' (substituted off) 45' (substituted in) 65' (substituted off) 83'
MF	15	(United States) Kaitlyn Zipay	(substituted in) 33' (substituted off) 45' (substituted in) 65' (substituted off) 81'
MF	18	(Portugal) Maria Alagoa	(substituted in) 33' (substituted off) 45' (substituted in) 65' (substituted off) 76'
FW	0	(United States) Olivia Garcia	(substituted in) 35' (substituted off) 45' (substituted in) 69' (substituted off) 78'
MF	16	(United States) Sophia Nguyen	(substituted in) 35' (substituted off) 45' (substituted in) 69' (substituted off) 81'
MF	4	(United States) Maggie Taitano	(substituted in) 86'
Head Coach:
(United States) Brian Pensky

GK	1	(United States) Ryan Campbell
DF	8	(United States) Mia Bhuta
DF	15	(United States) Kennedy Wesley		(substituted in) 86'
DF	2	(United States) Elise Evans
DF	18	(United States) Avani Brandt		(substituted off) 66' (substituted in) 86'
MF	21	(United States) Joelle Jung		(substituted off) 35' (substituted in) 45' (substituted off) 76'
MF	5	(United States) Shae Harvey	(yellow card) 86'	(substituted off) 60' (substituted in) 80'
MF	10	(United States) Maya Doms
FW	3	(United States) Allie Montoya		(substituted off) 36' (substituted in) 45' (substituted off) 69' (substituted in) 76'
FW	12	(United States) Jasmine Aikey		(substituted off) 69' (substituted in) 76'
FW	20	(United States) Andrea Kitahata		(substituted off) 28' (substituted in) 45' (substituted off) 57'
Substitutions:
FW	17	(United States) Erica Grillone		(substituted in) 28' (substituted off) 45' (substituted in) 57' (substituted off) 76'
FW	33	(United States) Lumi Kostmayer		(substituted in) 35' (substituted off) 38'
MF	11	(United States) Catherine Paulson		(substituted in) 36' (substituted off) 45' (substituted in) 69'
FW	24	(United States) Maryn Wolf		(substituted in) 38' (substituted off) 45' (substituted in) 69' (substituted off) 80'
MF	14	(United States) Julia Leontini		(substituted in) 60'
DF	23	(United States) Nya Harrison		(substituted in) 66'
Head Coach:
(United States) Paul Ratcliffe

College Cup MVP
Offensive: Jordynn Dudley
Defensive: Lauren Flynn

Assistant referees:
Katherine Mitchell (United States)
Maggie Short (United States)
Fourth official:
William Steffen (United States)

Match rules:

- 90 minutes.
- 20 minutes of extra time if necessary.
- Penalty shoot-out if scores still level.
- Unlimited substitutes, may not return if subbed out in the first half; may return unlimited times in the second half.

=== Statistics ===
Overall
	Florida State	Stanford
Goals scored	5	1
Total shots	16	5
Saves	0	3
Corner kicks	7	1
Offsides	2	0
Yellow cards	0	1
Red cards	0	0
