= William & Mary Tribe women's soccer =

American college soccer team

- Founded: 1981; 45 years ago
- University: College of William & Mary
- Head coach: Julie Shackford (7th season)
- Conference: CAA
- Location: Williamsburg, Virginia, US
- Stadium: Albert-Daly Field (capacity: 2,271)
- Nickname: Tribe
- Colors: Green and Gold
Home	Away

NCAA tournament Quarterfinals
- 1987, 1994, 1997

NCAA tournament appearances
- 1984, 1985, 1986, 1987, 1988, 1989, 1990, 1992, 1993, 1994, 1995, 1996, 1997, 1998, 1999, 2000, 2001, 2002, 2003, 2004, 2006, 2007, 2008, 2011, 2015

Conference tournament championships
- 1983, 1993, 1994, 1996, 1997, 1998, 1999, 2000, 2001, 2003, 2011

Conference regular season championships
- 1993, 1994, 1996, 1997, 1998, 1999, 2000, 2001, 2003, 2006, 2007, 2008, 2011, 2012

The William & Mary Tribe women's soccer team represents the College of William & Mary in NCAA Division I. The team belongs to the Colonial Athletic Association and plays home games at Albert-Daly Field. The Tribe are currently led by Julie Cunningham Shackford, who has coached since 2018.

Through the 2016 season, the Tribe recorded 36 consecutive winning seasons (in 2017, the streak was broken when the team finished 8–10–2). This is the second longest streak in NCAA history behind only North Carolina. They also hold two NCAA single season records, both of which occurred in 2005: Most ties (9) and most overtime games (11). Their 25 all-time NCAA tournament appearances rank fourth behind only perennial powers North Carolina (33 appearances), Connecticut (29), and Virginia (27).

== NCAA tournament results ==
- William & Mary has made 25 appearances in the NCAA Division I Women's Soccer Championship. They have a combined record of 11–23–3.

Year	Round	Opponents	Results/Scores
1984	First round	vs. Central Florida	L, 1–3
1985	First round	vs. George Mason	L, 2–3
1986	First round	vs. NC State	L, 0–1
1987	First round Quarterfinals	vs. Virginia vs. North Carolina	W, 1–0; L, 0–2
1988	First round	vs. George Mason	L, 0–1
1989	Quarterfinals	vs. NC State	L, 1–2
1990	First round	vs. NC State	L, 0–2
1992	First round Quarterfinals	vs. NC State vs. North Carolina	W, 1–0; L, 0–7
1993	Regional semifinals	vs. Wisconsin	L, 0–1
1994	Regional semifinals Regional Finals	vs. Washington State vs. Notre Dame	W, 4–0; L, 1–2
1995	First round	vs. NC State	L, 0–1 (OT)
1996	First round	vs. North Carolina	L, 0–5
1997	First round Second round Quarterfinals	vs. Penn State vs. Virginia vs. Connecticut	W, 3–2 (OT); W, 1–0; L, 0–4
1998	Second round Third round	vs. Maryland vs. North Carolina	W, 2–0; L, 0–3
1999	Second round Third round	vs. Duke vs. North Carolina	W, 3–0; L, 1–5
2000	First round	vs. UNC Greensboro	L, 2–3 (2OT)
2001	First round Second round	vs. Wake Forest vs. Virginia	W, 2–1 (2OT); L, 1–4
2002	First round	vs. Wake Forest	L, 0–2
2003	First round	vs. #7 Virginia	L, 1–1 (2–4 pen)
2004	Second round Third round	vs. Virginia Tech vs. North Carolina	W, 2–1; L, 0–6
2006	First round	vs. Navy	L, 0–0 (4–5 pen)
2007	First round Second round	vs. Georgetown vs. #4 Virginia	W, 2–1; L, 0–1
2008	First round Second round	vs. South Carolina vs. #3 Duke	W, 3–2; L, 0–1
2011	First round	vs. #3 North Carolina	L, 1–4
2015	First round Second round	vs. UCF vs. Florida	W, 0–0 (3–1 pen); L, 2–5

== Notable alumnae ==
- (United States) Caroline Casey (2012–2015)
- (United States) Ann Cook (1993–1997)
- (United States) Erica Dambach (1993–1996)
- (United States) Jill Ellis (1984–1987)
- (United States) Megan McCarthy (1984–1987)

== See also ==
- William & Mary Tribe men's soccer
