= 1986 NCAA Division I women's soccer tournament =

1986 NCAA women's soccer tournament
Women's College Cup (semifinals & final)

Tournament details
- Country: United States
- Teams: 12

Final positions
- Champions: North Carolina Tar Heels (4th title, 5th College Cup)
- Runner-up: Colorado College Tigers (1st title, 2nd College Cup)
- Semifinalists: George Mason Patriots (3rd College Cup); UMass Minutewomen (4th College Cup)

Tournament statistics
- Matches played: 11
- Goals scored: 28 (2.55 per match)
- Attendance: 6,524 (593 per match)
- Top goal scorer(s): April Heinrichs, UNC (5)

Awards
- Best player: April Heinrichs, UNC
- All statistics correct as of 4/26/2015.

The 1986 NCAA Division I women's soccer tournament was the fifth annual single-elimination tournament to determine the national champion of NCAA women's collegiate soccer. The championship game was played again at George Mason Stadium in Fairfax, Virginia during December 1986.

North Carolina defeated Colorado College in the final, 2–0, to win their fourth national title. Coached by Anson Dorrance, the Tar Heels finished the season 23–0–1. This was the first of North Carolina's record nine consecutive national titles (1986–1994).

The most outstanding player was April Heinrichs from North Carolina. An All-Tournament team, consisting of five players, was also named. Henrichs was also the tournament's leading scorer (4 goals).

== Qualification ==
With the inaugural edition of the NCAA Division III Women's Soccer Championship being held in 1986, the tournament eligibility was narrowed to just Division I and Division II women's soccer programs (a Division II championship was not added until 1988). Nonetheless, the tournament field decreased from the previous year, downsizing from 14 to 12 teams.

Team	Appearance	Previous	Record
Brown	5th	1985	11-2-2
California	3rd	1984	15-2-1
UC Santa Barbara	3rd	1985	13-2-2
Cal State–Hayward	2nd	1985	16-1-1
Cincinnati	2nd	1983	13-2-1
Colorado College	3rd	1985	15-3-1
Connecticut	5th	1985	14-4-1
George Mason	5th	1985	15-2-1
Massachusetts	5th	1985	13-2-2
North Carolina	5th	1985	21-0-1
NC State	2nd	1985	15-5-1
William & Mary	3rd	1985	15-2-1

== Bracket ==
First round
UC Santa Barbara	1
Cincinnati	0
NC State	1
William & Mary	0
California	2
Cal State–Hayward	0
Connecticut	5
Brown	0

Second round
North Carolina	8
UC Santa Barbara	0
George Mason (2OT, PK)	1
NC State	0
Colorado College	1
California	0
Massachusetts (2OT, PK)	1
Connecticut	0

Semifinals
North Carolina (2OT)	3
George Mason	2
Colorado College (2OT, PK)	1
Massachusetts	0

Championship (Women's College Cup); Fairfax, Virginia
North Carolina	2
Colorado College	0

== All tournament team ==
- April Heinrichs, North Carolina (Most outstanding player)
- Angela Berry, George Mason
- Betsy Drambour, George Mason
- Lisa Gmitter, George Mason
- Kim Maslin, George Mason

== See also ==
- NCAA Division I women's soccer championship
- NCAA Division III Women's Soccer Championship (begun 1986)
- 1986 NCAA Division I Men's Soccer Championship
