= 1994 NCAA Division I women's soccer tournament =

1994 NCAA women's soccer tournament
Women's College Cup (semifinals & final)

Tournament details
- Country: United States
- Dates: November–December 1994
- Teams: 24

Final positions
- Champions: North Carolina Tar Heels (12th title, 13th College Cup)
- Runners-up: Notre Dame Fighting Irish (1st title match, 1st College Cup)
- Semifinalists: Connecticut Huskies (5th College Cup); Portland Pilots (1st College Cup)

Tournament statistics
- Matches played: 23
- Goals scored: 77 (3.35 per match)
- Attendance: 28,251 (1,228 per match)
- Top goal scorer(s): Tiffeny Milbrett, Portland (5)

Awards
- Best player: Tisha Venturini, UNC (Offensive); Staci Wilson, UNC (Defensive)
- All statistics correct as of 5/21/2015.

The 1994 NCAA Division I women's soccer tournament was the 13th annual single-elimination tournament to determine the national champion of NCAA Division I women's collegiate soccer. The semifinals and championship game were played at Merlo Field in Portland, Oregon during December 1994.

North Carolina defeated Notre Dame in the final, 5–0, to win their 12th national title. Coached by Anson Dorrance, the Tar Heels finished the season 25–1–1. Nonetheless, this was UNC's first season with a loss since 1985. This would go on to become the ninth of North Carolina's record nine consecutive national titles (1986–1994).

The most outstanding offensive player was Tisha Venturini from North Carolina, and the most outstanding defensive player was Staci Wilson, also from North Carolina. Venturini and Wilson, along with twelve other players, were named to the All-tournament team.

The tournament's leading scorers were Angela Kelly (North Carolina), with 4 goals and 3 assists, and Tiffeny Milbrett (Portland), with 5 goals and 1 assist.

== Qualification ==
All Division I women's soccer programs were eligible to qualify for the tournament. The tournament field expanded for the second consecutive year, increasing from 16 to 24 teams.

=== Teams ===
Seed	School	Conference	Berth Type	Record
	Brown	Ivy League	Automatic	10-4-1
	Cincinnati	Great Midwest	Automatic	15-4-2
	Clemson	ACC	At-large	15-4
	Connecticut	Big East	At-large	17-3
	Dartmouth	Ivy League	At-large	11-3-1
	Duke	ACC	At-large	16-4-1
	George Mason	CAA	At-large	15-2-2
	Hartford	North Atlantic	Automatic	15-3-1
	Harvard	Ivy League	At-large	09-3-3
	Massachusetts	Atlantic 10	Automatic	15-5
	NC State	ACC	At-large	10-8-4
	North Carolina	ACC	Automatic	21-1-1
	Notre Dame	Midwestern Collegiate	Automatic	20-0-1
	Oregon State	Pac-10	At-large	13-4
	Portland	West Coast	Automatic	14-5
	Saint Mary's	West Coast	At-large	11-7-1
	Santa Clara	West Coast	At-large	14-4-1
	Stanford	Pac-10	At-large	16-1-1
	Vanderbilt	SEC	Automatic	16-3
	Virginia	ACC	At-large	13-4-3
	Washington	Pac-10	At-large	12-6-1
	Washington State	Pac-10	At-large	11-6-1
	William & Mary	CAA	Automatic	16-3
	Wisconsin	Big Ten	Automatic	16-5

== Bracket ==
First round
George Mason	3
Virginia	0
Washington State	3
Wisconsin	1
St. Mary's (CA)	2
Santa Clara	0
Washington	3
Oregon State	0
Brown	2
Dartmouth	1
Massachusetts	3
Harvard	0
Vanderbilt (3OT)	3
Cincinnati	2
NC State (4OT, PK)	1(5)
Clemson	1(4)

Regional semifinals
Notre Dame	3
George Mason	2
William & Mary	4
Washington State	0
Portland	6
St. Mary's (CA)	2
Stanford (2OT, PK)	0(6)
Washington	0(5)
Connecticut	1
Brown	0
Hartford	2
Massachusetts	1
Duke	2
Vanderbilt	1
North Carolina	4
NC State	2

Regional Finals
Notre Dame	2
William & Mary	1
Portland (3OT)	2
Stanford	1
Connecticut (3OT)	2
Hartford	1
Duke	1
North Carolina	3

Semifinals (Women's College Cup); Merlo Field; Portland, Oregon
Notre Dame	1
Portland	0
Connecticut	0
North Carolina	3

Championship (Women's College Cup); Merlo Field; Portland, Oregon
Notre Dame	0
North Carolina	5

== All-tournament team ==
- Robin Confer, North Carolina
- Cindy Daws, Notre Dame
- Danielle Egan, North Carolina
- Jill Gelfenbien, Connecticut
- Debbie Keller, North Carolina
- Angela Kelly, North Carolina
- Holly Manthei, Notre Dame
- Michelle McCarthy, Notre Dame
- Tiffeny Milbrett, Portland
- Jen Renola, Notre Dame
- Keri Sanchez, North Carolina
- Kate Sobrero, Notre Dame
- Tisha Venturini, North Carolina (most outstanding offensive player)
- Staci Wilson, North Carolina (most outstanding defensive player)

== See also ==
- 1994 NCAA Division I men's soccer tournament
- 1994 NCAA Division II women's soccer tournament
- 1994 NCAA Division III women's soccer tournament
- 1994 NAIA women's soccer tournament
