= Pam Baughman-Cornell =

American soccer player (born 1962)

Personal information
- Full name: Pamela Jane Cornell
- Birth name: Pamela Jane Baughman
- Date of birth: October 25, 1962 (age 64)
- Place of birth: Fairfax, Virginia, U.S.
- Position: Forward

Youth career
- Fairfax Rebels

College career
Years	Team	Apps	(Gls)
1981	UCF Knights	?	(18)
1983–1985	George Mason Patriots	?	(28)

International career
1985–1986	United States	4	(1)

Pamela Jane Cornell (née Baughman; born October 25, 1962) is an American former soccer player who played as a forward, making four appearances for the United States women's national team.

== Career ==
During college, Baughman-Cornell played for the UCF Knights in 1981, where she had 18 goals and 11 assists during the season. She was named a NSCAA All-American, was included in the AIAW Women's Soccer Championship All-Tournament Team, and was chosen as the team's most valuable player and rookie of the year. From 1983 to 1985, she played for the George Mason Patriots, where she won the NCAA Women's Soccer Tournament in 1985 and was named the tournament's most valuable player. In total, she had 28 goals and 17 assists for the team. She was chosen as NSCAA Hermann Female Player of the Year in 1981, and ISAA Player of the Year in 1985. She also was named in the NSCAA All-American team for 1983, 1984, and 1985, and was included in the NCAA All-Tournament Team in 1983.

Baughman-Cornell made her international debut for the United States on August 24, 1985 in a friendly match against Denmark. In total, she made four appearances for the U.S. and scored one goal, which came in her final cap on July 9, 1986 against Canada in a play-off for the 1986 North American Cup title (a friendly tournament). The match, which lasted 30 minutes, was won by the U.S 3–0 to win the tournament.

In 2001, she was inducted into the Virginia–D.C. Soccer Hall of Fame.

== Personal life ==
Baughman-Cornell was born in Fairfax, Virginia, to Monica L. (née Hanaghan) and Walter L. Baughman. She married Glenn Michael Cornell in Fairfax on January 25, 1986.

== Career statistics ==
=== International ===
United States
Year	Apps	Goals
1985	1	0
1986	3	1
Total	4	1

=== International goals ===
No.	Date	Venue	Opponent	Result	Competition
1	July 9, 1986	Blaine, Minnesota, United States	Canada	3–0	1986 North American Cup

== Honors ==
United States

- 1986 North American Cup
