= 1987 NCAA Division I women's soccer tournament =

1987 NCAA women's soccer tournament
Women's College Cup (semifinals & final)

Tournament details
- Country: United States
- Teams: 12

Final positions
- Champions: North Carolina Tar Heels (5th title, 6th College Cup)
- Runner-up: UMass Minutewomen (1st title match, 4th College Cup)
- Semifinalists: California Golden Bears (2nd College Cup); Central Florida Knights (2nd College Cup)

Tournament statistics
- Matches played: 11
- Goals scored: 26 (2.36 per match)
- Attendance: 10,482 (953 per match)
- Top goal scorer(s): Michelle Akers, UCF (3)

Awards
- Best player: Michelle Akers, UCF (Offensive); Debbie Belkin, UMass (Defensive)
- All statistics correct as of 4/28/2015.

The 1987 NCAA Division I women's soccer tournament was the sixth annual single-elimination tournament to determine the national champion of NCAA women's collegiate soccer. The championship game was played again at Warren McGuirk Alumni Stadium in Amherst, Massachusetts during December 1987.

North Carolina defeated Massachusetts in the final, 1–0, to win their fifth national title. Coached by Anson Dorrance, the Tar Heels finished the season 23–0–1. This was the second of North Carolina's record nine consecutive national titles (1986–1994).

The most outstanding offensive player was Michelle Akers from Central Florida, and the most outstanding defensive player was Debbie Belkin from Massachusetts. Akers was also the tournament's leading scorer (3 goals).

== Qualification ==
With the advent of the NCAA Division III Women's Soccer Championship in 1986, the tournament eligibility remained fixed for just Division I and Division II women's soccer programs. The Division II championship was not added until the following season, 1988. Nonetheless, the tournament field remained fixed at 12 teams.

Team	Appearance	Previous	Record
Barry	1st	Never	13-2-1
California	4th	1986	15-0
UC Santa Barbara	4th	1986	16-3-1
Central Florida	3rd	1984	11-4
Colorado College	4th	1986	15-2-1
Connecticut	6th	1986	15-4-3
Massachusetts	6th	1986	18-1
North Carolina	6th	1986	20-0-1
NC State	3rd	1986	17-3-1
Rutgers	1st	None	12-5
Virginia	1st	None	14-6-1
William & Mary	4th	1986	09-6-3

== Bracket ==
First round
William & Mary	1
Virginia	0
UC Santa Barbara (2OT)	1
Colorado College	0
Central Florida	3
Barry	0
Connecticut	1
Rutgers	0

Second round
North Carolina	2
William & Mary	0
California	3
UC Santa Barbara	0
NC State	0
Central Florida	3
Massachusetts	3
Connecticut	1

Semifinals
North Carolina	4
California	0
Central Florida	1
Massachusetts	2

Championship (Women's College Cup); Amherst, Massachusetts
North Carolina	1
Massachusetts	0

== See also ==
- NCAA Division I women's soccer championship
- NCAA Division III Women's Soccer Championship
- 1987 NCAA Division I Men's Soccer Championship
