= 1995 NCAA Division I women's soccer tournament =

1995 NCAA women's soccer tournament
Women's College Cup (semifinals & final)

Tournament details
- Country: United States
- Dates: November–December 1995
- Teams: 24

Final positions
- Champions: Notre Dame Fighting Irish (1st title, 2nd College Cup)
- Runners-up: Portland Pilots (1st title match, 2nd College Cup)
- Semifinalists: North Carolina Tar Heels (14th College Cup); SMU Mustangs (1st College Cup)

Tournament statistics
- Matches played: 23
- Goals scored: 71 (3.09 per match)
- Attendance: 37,995 (1,652 per match)
- Top goal scorer(s): Danielle Garrett, SMU (4)

Awards
- Best player: Cindy Daws, UND (Offensive); Kate Sobrero, UND (Defensive)

The 1995 NCAA Division I women's soccer tournament was the 14th annual single-elimination tournament to determine the national champion of NCAA Division I women's collegiate soccer. The semifinals and championship game were played at Fetzer Field in Chapel Hill, North Carolina during December 1995.

Notre Dame defeated Portland in the final, 1–0 (in three overtimes), to win their first national title. Coached by Chris Petrucelli, the Irish finished the season 21–2–2. This was the first championship since 1985 not won by North Carolina, whose record streak of nine consecutive national titles (1986–1994) was broken. This was also the first final match to not feature the Tar Heels.

The most outstanding offensive player was Cindy Daws from Notre Dame, and the most outstanding defensive player was Kate Sobrero, also from Notre Dame. Daws and Sobrero, were named to the All-tournament team.

The tournament's leading scorer, with 4 goals and 1 assist, was Danielle Garrett from SMU.

== Qualification ==
All Division I women's soccer programs were eligible to qualify for the tournament. A total of 24 teams were invited to participate in this tournament.

=== Teams ===
Seed	School	Conference	Berth Type	Record
	Clemson	ACC	At-large	14-6
	Connecticut	Big East	At-large	18-2-2
	Duke	ACC	At-large	14-6-1
	Hartford	North Atlantic	Automatic	15-3-2
	James Madison	CAA	Automatic	14-6-1
	Kentucky	SEC	Automatic	17-6
	Maryland	ACC	At-large	17-5
	Massachusetts	Atlantic 10	Automatic	13-3-2
	Minnesota	Big Ten	Automatic	16-4-2
	NC State	ACC	At-large	17-4
	North Carolina	ACC	Automatic	23-0
	Notre Dame	Big East	Automatic	17-2-2
	Penn State	Big Ten	At-large	15-6-1
	Portland	West Coast	Automatic	17-0-2
	Santa Clara	West Coast	At-large	14-3-2
	SMU	Southwest	Automatic	21-0-1
	Stanford	Pac-10	Automatic	16-3
	Texas A&M	Southwest	At-large	17-5
	UCLA	Pac-10	At-large	14-3-2
	Vanderbilt	SEC	At-large	13-6
	Virginia	ACC	At-large	14-4-2
	Washington	Pac-10	At-large	11-7
	William & Mary	CAA	At-large	14-5-1
	Wisconsin	Big Ten	At-large	13-5-4

== Bracket ==
First round
Vanderbilt	3
Kentucky	0
Santa Clara (2OT)	3
Stanford	2
Massachusetts (2OT)	2
Hartford	1
Wisconsin	1
Minnesota	0
Texas A&M	4
Clemson	1
NC State (OT)	1
William & Mary	0
James Madison	2
Penn State	1
Washington	2
UCLA	1

Second round
North Carolina	4
Vanderbilt	0
Virginia	0
Santa Clara	1
Connecticut	3
Massachusetts	0
Notre Dame	5
Wisconsin	0
SMU	2
Texas A&M	1
Duke	1
NC State (3OT)	2
Maryland	6
James Madison	1
Portland	1
Washington	0

Third Round
North Carolina	2
Santa Clara	0
Connecticut	0
Notre Dame	2
SMU	4
NC State	3
Maryland	0
Portland	1

Semifinals (Women's College Cup); Fetzer Field; Chapel Hill, North Carolina
North Carolina	0
Notre Dame	1
SMU	2
Portland	4

Championship (Women's College Cup); Fetzer Field; Chapel Hill, North Carolina
Notre Dame (3OT)	1
Portland	0

== All-tournament team ==
- Robin Confer, North Carolina
- Cindy Daws, Notre Dame (most outstanding offensive player)
- Erin Fahey, Portland
- Danielle Garrett, SMU
- Shannon MacMillan, Portland
- Holly Manthei, Notre Dame
- Michelle McCarthy, Notre Dame
- Wynne McIntosh, Portland
- Cindy Parlow, North Carolina
- Jen Renola, Notre Dame
- Kate Sobrero, Notre Dame (most outstanding defensive player)
- Staci Wilson, North Carolina

== See also ==
- 1995 NCAA Division I men's soccer tournament
- 1995 NCAA Division II women's soccer tournament
- 1995 NCAA Division III women's soccer tournament
- 1995 NAIA women's soccer tournament
