= Chris Pittaro =

American baseball player (born 1961)

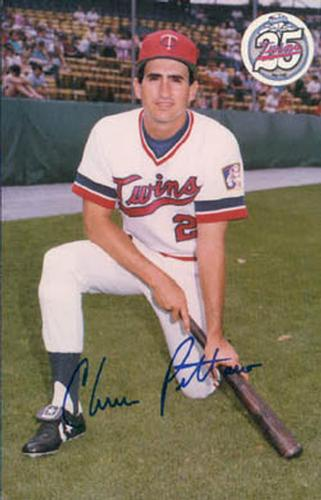
- Infielder
- Born: September 16, 1961 (age 65); Trenton, New Jersey, U.S.
- Batted: Switch Threw: Right

MLB debut
- April 8, 1985, for the Detroit Tigers

Last MLB appearance
- October 4, 1987, for the Minnesota Twins

MLB statistics
- Batting average: .221
- Runs: 16
- Hits: 21
- Stats at Baseball Reference

Teams
- Detroit Tigers (1985); Minnesota Twins (1986–1987)

Christopher Francis Pittaro (born September 16, 1961) is an American former professional baseball infielder. Pittaro played during three seasons in Major League Baseball for the Detroit Tigers and Minnesota Twins from 1985 through 1987. Prior to playing professionally, he played college baseball for the North Carolina Tar Heels. He has served as a scout and front office executive for the Oakland Athletics since 1991.

== Playing career ==
=== Amateur ===
Pittaro attended Steinert High School in Hamilton Township, Mercer County, New Jersey, and has been inducted into the Steinert High School Hall of Fame. He then enrolled at the University of North Carolina at Chapel Hill, where he played college baseball for the North Carolina Tar Heels baseball team in the Atlantic Coast Conference of the National Collegiate Athletic Association's Division I. In 1980, he played collegiate summer baseball with the Wareham Gatemen of the Cape Cod Baseball League, and returned to the league in 1981 to play for the Chatham A's.

=== Professional ===
The Detroit Tigers selected Pittaro in the sixth round, with the 152nd overall selection, of the 1982 Major League Baseball draft as a shortstop. Pittaro played his first professional season with the Macon Peaches of the Class-A South Atlantic League in 1982. Pittaro moved to second base when he played for the Lakeland Tigers of the Class-A Florida State League in 1983. He was promoted to the Birmingham Barons of the Class-AA Southern League in 1984, where he had a .284 batting average and 11 home runs.

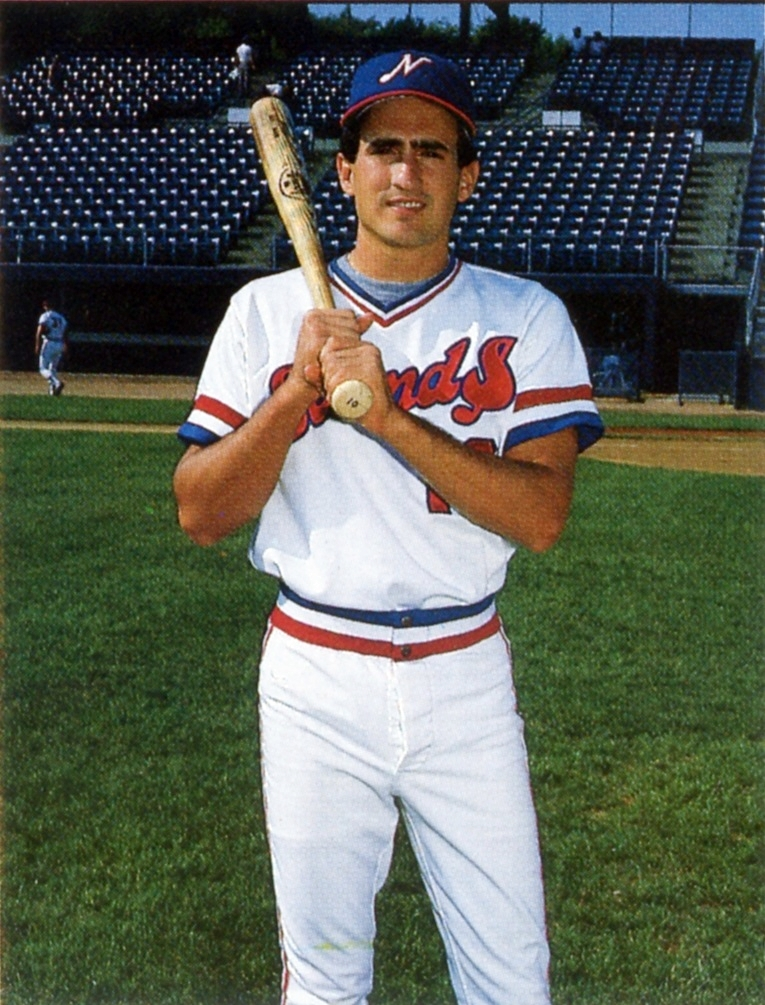
Pittaro with the Nashville Sounds in 1985

"Pittaro has a chance to be the greatest second baseman who ever lived."

— Sparky Anderson

Pittaro was invited to spring training with the Tigers in 1985. Manager Sparky Anderson called Pittaro "the best rookie [he'd] seen in 15 years." Due to a strong performance from Pittaro, Anderson considered moving All-Star second baseman Lou Whitaker to third base so that Pittaro could play second for the Tigers, though the Tigers kept Whitaker at second and moved Pittaro to third when Whitaker said he wanted to remain at second. Though he expected to begin the season with the Nashville Sounds of the Class-AAA American Association, Pittaro made the Tigers out of spring training, serving in a platoon with Tom Brookens. Pittaro debuted in MLB on April 8, 1985, Opening Day and had three hits in four at-bats.

Pittaro began the 1985 season with a batting average over .300 in April. However, he began to slump in May and continued to struggle offensively with the Tigers. He was demoted to Nashville during the season after he batted .242 with a .299 on-base percentage and .323 slugging percentage.

Before the 1986 season, the Tigers traded Pittaro with Alejandro Sánchez to the Minnesota Twins for Dave Engle. He played with the Twins, batting .095 in a backup role before he was demoted to the Toledo Mud Hens of the Class-AAA International League. Pittaro and split the 1987 season with the Twins and their new Class-AAA affiliate, the Portland Beavers of the Pacific Coast League. While with Portland, his roommate on road trips was Billy Beane. Pittaro didn't make the Twins in 1988. He was assigned to Portland, and retired during the season.

== Scouting and executive career ==
Pittaro has been a scout and front office executive in the Oakland Athletics organization since 1991. Beane, the Athletics' general manager, identifies Pittaro as one of the scouts willing to rethink everything he knows about baseball. Pittaro joined the Athletics as a scout and cross-checker. He managed the Southern Oregon Athletics of the Class-A Northwest League in 1992. He was named national field coordinator, serving from 2002 through 2007, when he became the club's director of professional scouting from 2008 to 2011. He was named special assistant to the general manager after the 2011 season.

== Personal life ==
Pittaro's father, Sonny Pittaro, was an infielder in the Minnesota Twins' minor league organization from 1960 to 1962 and then a longtime coach at Rider University. After his playing career, Pittaro graduated summa cum laude with a Bachelor of Science in finance from Rider. He is married to Lisa Gmitter, former soccer player and U.S. national team member.

Pittaro is mentioned in Moneyball, a book focusing on the 2002 Oakland Athletics season. He was initially cast to play himself in the film version.
