= 1984 NCAA women's soccer tournament =

Women's College Cup (semifinals & final)

Tournament details
- Country: United States
- Teams: 14

Final positions
- Champions: North Carolina Tar Heels (3rd title, 3rd College Cup)
- Runner-up: Connecticut Huskies (1st title game, 2nd College Cup)
- Third place: UMass Minutewomen (2nd College Cup)
- Fourth place: California Golden Bears (1st College Cup)

Tournament statistics
- Matches played: 12
- Goals scored: 40 (3.33 per match)
- Attendance: 6,048 (504 per match)
- Top goal scorer(s): Catherine Spence, UMass (5)

Awards
- Best player: April Heinrichs, UNC (Overall); Amy Machin, UNC (offense); Shelley McElroy, UConn (defense)
- All statistics correct as of 4/22/2015.

The 1984 NCAA Women's Soccer Tournament was the third annual single-elimination tournament to determine the national champion of NCAA women's collegiate soccer. The championship game was again played at Fetzer Field in Chapel Hill, North Carolina during December 1984.

North Carolina defeated Connecticut in the final, 2–0, to win their third consecutive national title. The Tar Heels were coached by Anson Dorrance.

The most outstanding player was April Heinrichs (North Carolina), the most outstanding offensive player was Amy Machin (North Carolina), and the most outstanding defensive player was Shelley McElroy (Connecticut). An All-Tournament team was not named this year.

The leading scorer for the tournament was Catherine Spence from Massachusetts (5 goals).

== Qualification ==
At the time, there was only one NCAA championship for women's soccer; a Division III title was added in 1986 and a Division II title in 1988. Hence, all NCAA women's soccer programs (whether from Division I, Division II, or Division III) were eligible for this championship. The tournament field expanded for the first time this year, from 12 to 14 teams.

Team	Appearance	Previous	Record
Boston College	3rd	1983	12-5-1
Brown	3rd	1983	13-0-1
California	2nd	1983	11-3-1
UC Santa Barbara	1st	Never	16-4-1
Central Florida	2nd	1982	09-3
Colorado College	1st	Never	10-4
Connecticut	3rd	1983	14-3-2
Cortland State	3rd	1983	12-5-2
George Mason	3rd	1983	15-2-3
Harvard	2nd	1982	13-2-1
Massachusetts	3rd	1983	12-2-2
North Carolina	3rd	1983	21-0-1
Vermont	1st	Never	11-2-1
William & Mary	1st	Never	10-6-4

== Bracket ==
First round
Connecticut	3
Cortland State	0
Harvard	2
Vermont	1
Massachusetts (2OT)	3
Boston College	2
Colorado College	2
George Mason	1
California	2
UC Santa Barbara	0
Central Florida	3
William & Mary	1

Second round
Brown	0
Connecticut	1
Harvard	0
Massachusetts	1
Colorado College	0
California (2OT, 1-0 PK)	0
North Carolina	4
Central Florida	1

Semifinals
Connecticut (2OT)	2
Massachusetts	1
California	1
North Carolina (2OT)	2

Championship (Women's College Cup); Chapel Hill, North Carolina
Connecticut	0
North Carolina	2
Third place
Massachusetts	4
California	1

== See also ==
- NCAA Division I women's soccer championship
- 1984 NCAA Division I Men's Soccer Championship
