= 1985 NCAA women's soccer tournament =

Women's College Cup (semifinals & final)

Tournament details
- Country: United States
- Teams: 14

Final positions
- Champions: George Mason Patriots (1st title, 2nd College Cup)
- Runner-up: North Carolina Tar Heels (4th title game, 4th College Cup)
- Semifinalists: UMass Minutewomen (3rd College Cup); Colorado College Tigers (1st College Cup)

Tournament statistics
- Matches played: 13
- Goals scored: 43 (3.31 per match)
- Attendance: 8,033 (618 per match)
- Top goal scorer(s): Lisa Gmitter, GMU (3)

Awards
- Best player: Pam Baughman, GMU (Overall); Betsy Drambour, GMU (defense)
- All statistics correct as of 4/22/2015.

The 1985 NCAA Women's Soccer Tournament was the fourth annual single-elimination tournament to determine the national champion of NCAA women's collegiate soccer. The championship game was played at George Mason Stadium in Fairfax, Virginia during November 1985.

George Mason defeated defending champion North Carolina in the final, 2–0, to win its first national title. The Patriots were coached by Hank Leung. This would be the last championship until 1995 not won by North Carolina.

The most outstanding player was Pam Baughman (George Mason) and the most outstanding defensive player was Betsy Drambour (George Mason). An All-Tournament team was not named this year.

The leading scorer for the tournament was Lisa Gmitter from George Mason (3 goals).

== Qualification ==
At the time, there was only one NCAA championship for women's soccer; a Division III title was added in 1986 and a Division II title in 1988. Hence, all NCAA women's soccer programs (whether from Division I, Division II, or Division III) were eligible for this championship. The tournament field remained set at 14 teams this year even though the third-place match was discontinued.

Team	Appearance	Previous	Record
Boston College	4th	1984	12–4–1
Brown	4th	1984	09–3–3
UC Santa Barbara	2nd	1984	16–4–1
Cal State–Hayward	1st	Never	18–0
Colorado College	2nd	1984	14–4
Connecticut	4th	1984	14–4
Cortland State	4th	1984	17–0–4
George Mason	4th	1984	14–2–1
Massachusetts	4th	1984	15–0
North Carolina	4th	1984	16–1–1
NC State	1st	Never	10–5–4
Radford	1st	Never	14–6–1
William & Mary	2nd	1984	09–2–3
Wisconsin	1st	Never	12–1

== Bracket ==
First round
Boston College (2OT)	3
Brown	2
George Mason (2OT, PK)	3
William & Mary	2
Cortland State	1
Connecticut	0
NC State (2OT, PK)	1
Radford	0
Colorado College	1
Wisconsin	0
UC Santa Barbara (2OT, PK)	4
Cal State–Hayward	3

Second round
Massachusetts	3
Boston College	0
George Mason	1
Cortland State	0
North Carolina	4
NC State	2
Colorado College	3
UC Santa Barbara	0

Semifinals
Massachusetts (2OT)	0
George Mason	3
North Carolina	3
Colorado College	2

Championship (Women's College Cup); Fairfax, Virginia
George Mason	2
North Carolina	0

== See also ==
- NCAA Division I women's soccer championship
- 1985 NCAA Division I Men's Soccer Championship
