= NC State Wolfpack women's soccer =

American college soccer team

- 2026 NC State Wolfpack women's soccer team
- Founded: 1984; 42 years ago
- University: North Carolina State University
- Head coach: Gary Higgins (2nd season)
- Conference: ACC
- Location: Raleigh, North Carolina, US
- Stadium: Dail Soccer Field (capacity: 3,000)
- Nickname: Wolfpack
- Colors: Red and white
Home	Away

NCAA tournament runner-up
- 1988

NCAA tournament College Cup
- 1988, 1989

NCAA tournament Quarterfinals
- 1988, 1989, 1995

NCAA tournament Round of 16
- 1988, 1989, 1995, 2016, 2018, 2019

NCAA tournament appearances
- 1985, 1986, 1987, 1988, 1989, 1990, 1991, 1992, 1994, 1995, 1996, 2016, 2017, 2018, 2019, 2021, 2022

Conference tournament championships
- 1988

Conference regular season championships
- 1988

The NC State Wolfpack women's soccer team is who represents North Carolina State University as they are in the Atlantic Coast Conference (ACC) of NCAA Division I women's college soccer. The team has advanced to the NCAA Women's soccer tournament 14 times. The most notable of these appearances was in 1988, when the Wolfpack finished runners up.

== History ==
=== 1980s ===
The Wolfpack women's soccer program was founded in 1984 under head coach Larry Gross. The team enjoyed a successful first season, only losing one game, to finish 11–1–4. The next year they finished with the same win total, and qualified for the program's first NCAA Tournament. 1986, saw the Wolfpack improve to 16 wins, and again qualify for the NCAA Tournament. In 1987, the team joined the Atlantic Coast Conference. 1988 was the Wolfpack's best year in their history. The team finished with a 19–2–3 record, won the ACC Tournament, finished first in the ACC standings, and finished runner up in the NCAA tournament. The decade would close on a high note as the team again enjoyed success. They finished runner up in the ACC tournament, and advanced to the semifinals of the NCAA tournament.

=== 1990s ===
The Wolfpack's success continued into the 1990s, with the team continuing to win double digit games, and qualify for the NCAA Tournament. The team won a program second-best 18 games in 1991, and finished runner up in the ACC tournament that year. However, win totals started to decline, as the team won 10 games in 1993, a then program low. 1993 also marked the first year since the team was founded, that the Wolfpack did not qualify for the NCAA Tournament. Prior to the 1994 season, head coach Larry Gross resigned, citing the desire to spend more time with his family. Alvin Corneal was hired as a replacement. His first season in charge resulted in a semifinal in the ACC tournament and a trip to the second round in the NCAA Tournament. This was improved upon in 1995, when the Wolfpack tied a program record with 19 wins, and made the Quarterfinals of the NCAA tournament. However, the team's record fell off, winning only 11 games in 1996 and 9 games in 1997. 1997 was the first time the Wolfpack had a losing season in their history. Corneal would not continue as head coach after that season. In December 1997, Laura Kerrigan was hired as the third head coach in program history. Kerrigan's first two seasons were difficult. The team won only 7 games in 1998 and 1999. Both seasons were a program low at the time.

=== 2000s ===
The beginning of the decade saw a string of mediocre seasons. 2000-2003 all saw the Wolfpack finish between 8 and 10 wins and 7 and 10 losses. The team made the ACC tournament in all of those years, but never qualified for the NCAA tournament. 2004 started a slide for the team. The Wolfpack finished 7–8–3 and would not have another winning season until 2011. 2005 was the first year since the ACC tournament began that NC State did not qualify for the tournament. 2006 proved a blip on the radar when the team finished 9–9–2 and qualified for the ACC tournament. This would be the last ACC tournament the team would qualify for until 2016. After a 2007 and 2008 season which saw the Wolfpack go a combined 0–19–1 in ACC play Kerrigan stepped down as head coach. Shortly thereafter, in January 2009, Steve Springthorpe was named the fourth head coach in the program's history. In his first season, 2009, the team finished 8–9–2 and notched their first ACC wins in 2 years, finishing 2–7–1 in ACC play.

=== 2010s ===
Springthorpe's tenure endured a tough 2010, with the Wolfpack finishing 7–12–0 overall and 1–9–0 in ACC play. 2011 was the team's first winning season since 2002, but the success was not matched in ACC play, where the team finished 1–7–2. 2012 saw a fall in performance when the Wolfpack finished 5–14–0 overall and 0–10–0 in ACC play. In October 2012, Springthorpe resigned to pursue other professional opportunities. One month later, in November 2012, Tim Santoro was announced as the new head coach. Santoro's first season, 2013, came with a 7–12 record and 2 ACC wins. However, these would prove to be the team's only ACC wins in a four-year span. The Wolfpack lost 15 games in both 2014 and 2015, and did not win an ACC game in either year. 2016 saw a drastic improvement. The Wolfpack finished 11–9–2, qualified for the ACC Tournament, and qualified for the NCAA Tournament. This was their first ACC Tournament since 2006, and first NCAA Tournament since 1996. The team reached the quarterfinals of the NCAA tournament, a first in 21 years. 2017 saw similar success with the team winning 15 games, reaching the semifinals of the ACC Tournament and the second round of the NCAA Tournament. In 2018, the team did not qualify for the ACC Tournament, but reached the Round of 16 in the NCAA Tournament.

=== 2020s ===
The decade started with a season effected by the COVID-19 pandemic. The Wolfpack decided to opt out of the season due to concerns surrounding the pandemic. However, the Wolfpack returned for the spring season and finished 5–3–1 but were not invited to the NCAA Tournament. The non-invite snapped a four-year streak of being invited to the tournament. 2021 saw a return to a more normal schedule where the Wolfpack posted a 9–9–2 overall record and went 4–6–0 in ACC play. They returned to the NCAA Tournament four the fifth time in six years. In 2022, the Wolfpack finished 7–7–6 overall and 2–6–2 in ACC play. Their seven overall wins and 2 ACC wins were the worst in a full season since 2015. However, they received an invitation NCAA Tournament, extending their streak to six out of seven years and six straight full seasons of play. In 2023, the Wolfpack would fare worse, finishing 3–9–6 overall and 2–5–3 in ACC play. Their season was the worst since 2014 and was a downward trend from the previous season. The downward trend continued into 2024 as the Wolfpack finished 4–10–4 overall and 1–6–3 in ACC play. After the season, Tim Santoro was fired as head coach. Gary Higgins was hired as the team's new head coach. Higgins got off to a slow start in 2025, but rebounded during ACC play to finish 5–9–4 overall and 4–4–2 in ACC play. The improvement was not enough to qualify for the ACC or NCAA tournaments.

== Personnel ==
=== Current roster ===
As of February 2, 2026

Note: Flags indicate national team as defined under FIFA eligibility rules; some limited exceptions apply. Players may hold more than one non-FIFA nationality.

No.	Pos.	Nation	Player
1	GK	USA	Olivia Pratapas
2	DF	JPN	Yuna Aoki
4	MF	ENG	Maia Lazaro
5	DF	USA	Alex Mohr
6	MF	JPN	Mana Nakata
7	FW	USA	Erica Roberts
8	MF	CAN	Rosalie Olou
9	FW	CAN	Tierra Garniss
10	FW	URU	Antonella Mazziotto
11	MF	USA	Eliza Rich
13	FW	USA	Jade Bordeleau
14	FW	USA	Madie Miller
15	FW	USA	Daisy Duda

No.	Pos.	Nation	Player
17	MF	CAN	Emily Wong
18	GK	GER	Sina Tölzel
19	DF	CAN	Chloe Stanley
20	DF	USA	Brooklyn Holt
21	MF	USA	Mary Frances Symmes
23	MF	ENG	Lilly Soltz
24	DF	USA	Sophia Varga
25	DF	USA	Avery Richards
26	GK	USA	Emily Earles
27	FW	ENG	Mackenzie Smith
28	MF	USA	Sophia Hernandez
29	MF	NED	Fien Leijdekker

=== Team management ===
Position	Staff
Head coach	Gary Higgins
Associate head coach	Joanna Fennema
Assistant Coach	David Rodriguez
Assistant Coach	Juan Basabe
Director of Operations	Lizzie Hedrick

== Seasons ==
Season	Head coach	Season result						Tournament results	
Season	Head coach	Overall			Conference			Conference	NCAA
Season	Head coach	Wins	Losses	Ties	Wins	Losses	Ties	Conference	NCAA
1984	Larry Gross	11	1	4	No Conference				—
1985	Larry Gross	11	6	4	No Conference				NCAA Second Round
1986	Larry Gross	16	6	1	No Conference				NCAA Second Round
1987†	Larry Gross	17	4	1	1	1	1	—	NCAA Second Round
1988	Larry Gross	19	2	3	3	0	1	Champions	NCAA Runner up
1989	Larry Gross	15	8	2	3	1	0	Runner up	NCAA Semifinals
1990	Larry Gross	14	7	1	2	2	0	First round	NCAA Second Round
1991	Larry Gross	18	5	0	2	2	0	Runner-Up	NCAA Second Round
1992	Larry Gross	15	6	1	3	1	0	First round	NCAA First Round
1993	Larry Gross	10	8	1	1	2	1	First round	—
1994	Alvin Corneal	10	9	5	1	4	1	Semifinals	NCAA Second Round
1995	Alvin Corneal	19	5	0	6	1	0	Semifinals	NCAA Quarterfinals
1996	Alvin Corneal	11	9	1	3	3	1	First round	NCAA First Round
1997	Alvin Corneal	9	11	1	2	5	0	First round	—
1998	Laura Kerrigan	7	12	1	1	5	1	First round	—
1999	Laura Kerrigan	7	10	2	1	4	2	First round	—
2000	Laura Kerrigan	10	7	3	2	3	2	First round	—
2001	Laura Kerrigan	8	10	0	0	7	0	First round	—
2002	Laura Kerrigan	10	8	1	2	4	1	First round	—
2003	Laura Kerrigan	9	9	1	1	6	0	First round	—
2004	Laura Kerrigan	7	8	3	1	7	0	First round	—
2005	Laura Kerrigan	6	12	0	2	8	0	—	—
2006	Laura Kerrigan	9	9	2	3	7	0	First round	—
2007	Laura Kerrigan	6	10	3	0	9	1	—	—
2008	Laura Kerrigan	8	12	0	0	10	0	—	—
2009	Steve Springthorpe	8	9	2	2	7	1	—	—
2010	Steve Springthorpe	7	12	0	1	9	0	—	—
2011	Steve Springthorpe	10	8	2	1	7	2	—	—
2012	Steve Springthorpe	5	14	0	0	10	0	—	—
2013	Tim Santoro	7	12	0	2	11	0	—	—
2014	Tim Santoro	2	15	2	0	10	0	—	—
2015	Tim Santoro	4	15	0	0	10	0	—	—
2016	Tim Santoro	11	9	2	4	5	1	First round	NCAA Round of 16
2017	Tim Santoro	15	5	2	6	3	1	Semifinals	NCAA Second Round
2018	Tim Santoro	11	7	4	3	5	2	—	NCAA Round of 16
2019	Tim Santoro	12	7	4	4	2	4	Semifinals	NCAA Round of 16
2020	Tim Santoro	5	3	1	0	0	0	—	—
2021	Tim Santoro	9	9	2	4	6	0	—	NCAA Second Round
2022	Tim Santoro	7	7	6	2	6	2	—	NCAA First Round
2023	Tim Santoro	3	9	6	2	5	3	—	—
2024	Tim Santoro	4	10	4	1	6	3	—	—
2025	Gary Higgins	5	9	4	4	4	2	—	—

†In 1987, the Wolfpack began play in the Atlantic Coast Conference.

== Notable alumni ==
=== Current Professional Players ===
As of February 2, 2026

- (United States) Linda Hamilton (1987–1989) – Currently Head Coach at Southwestern University
- (Germany) Franziska Jaser (2014–2015) – Currently with Eintracht Frankfurt II
- (United States) Taylor Porter (2015–2018) – Currently with Carolina Ascent FC
- (United States) Tziarra King (2016–2019) – Currently with Brooklyn FC
- (Germany) Ricarda Walkling (2016–2019) – Currently with Werder Bremen
- (United States) Jenna Butler (2018–2022) – Currently with Carolina Ascent FC
- (Czech Republic) Antonie Stárová (2019–2022) – Currently with Sparta Prague
- Jameese Joseph (2019–2023) – Currently with Chicago Red Stars and United States international
- (United States) Abi Hugh (2024) – Currently with Fort Lauderdale United FC
