= Lisa Gmitter-Pittaro =

American soccer player (born 1965)

Personal information
- Full name: Lisa Joan Pittaro
- Birth name: Lisa Joan Gmitter
- Date of birth: May 22, 1965 (age 61)
- Place of birth: New Jersey, United States
- Height: 5 ft 5 in (1.65 m)
- Position: Forward

Youth career
- –1982: Steinert Spartans

College career
Years	Team	Apps	(Gls)
1983–1986	George Mason Patriots	84	(64)

Senior career*
Years	Team	Apps	(Gls)
- New Jersey Wildcats
- Maryland Pride

International career
1986–1987	United States	12	(3)
1990	United States B	?	(1)

Managerial career
- Steinert Spartans Boys' JV
- Steinert Spartans (assistant)
- * Club domestic league appearances and goals

Lisa Joan Pittaro (née Gmitter; born May 22, 1965) is an American former soccer player who played as a forward, making twelve appearances for the United States women's national team.

== Career ==
Raised in Hamilton Township, Mercer County, New Jersey, Gmitter-Pittaro played for the Steinert Spartans in high school, where she was a three-time All-American and set the school career record with 177 goals. She also played basketball and volleyball while at Steinert. In college, she played for the George Mason Patriots from 1983 to 1986, helping the team to win the 1985 NCAA Women's Soccer Tournament. In total, she scored 64 goals and recorded 18 assists in 84 appearances for the Patriots. Her career goal tally ranks second in school history, while her career points (goals and assists) of 146 ranks third. She was an NSCAA All-American in all four seasons, being included in the first team in 1983, 1985, and 1986, and the third team in 1984. She was also an NSCAA First-Team All-Region in all four seasons, and was Soccer America Player of the Year in 1985. She was included in the NCAA All-Tournament Team in 1983, where she was chosen as the offensive MVP, the championship-winning 1985 tournament, and 1986.

Gmitter-Pittaro made her international debut for the United States on July 7, 1986 in the 1986 North American Cup friendly tournament against Canada. In total, she made twelve appearances for the U.S. and scored three goals, earning her final cap on December 20, 1987 in a friendly match against Chinese Taipei. In 1990, she also appeared for the United States B team in the North American Cup, scoring one goal in a 2–3 loss against Germany.

She played club soccer for the New Jersey Wildcats and Maryland Pride. However, her career was sidelined due to injury.

Gmitter-Pittaro later coached youth soccer, including the boys' junior varsity team at Steinert High School. She was inducted into Steinert's Hall of Fame in 2006, and is a member of the Mercer County Athletic Hall of Fame and Mercer County Soccer Hall of Fame. She was also included in the NCAA Division I Women's Soccer 25th Anniversary Team in 2006.

== Personal life ==
Gmitter-Pittaro has worked as a teacher in the Hamilton Township School District, and is married to former professional baseball player Chris Pittaro. She has two children with Chris, as well as a stepdaughter. Her daughter Giana played soccer for the Yale Bulldogs, while her son C.J. is a college baseball player at Penn State.

== Career statistics ==
=== International ===
United States
Year	Apps	Goals
1986	6	1
1987	6	2
Total	12	3

=== International goals ===
No.	Date	Location	Opponent	Result	Competition
1	July 9, 1986	Blaine, Minnesota, United States	Canada	1–2	1986 North American Cup
2	December 16, 1987	Taipei, Taiwan	Australia	6–0	Friendly
3	December 19, 1987	Taipei, Taiwan	Canada	4–0	Friendly

== Honors ==
United States

- 1986 North American Cup
