= NCAA Division I women's soccer tournament =

College soccer tournament

Women's Division I Soccer Championship
- Organizer(s): NCAA
- Founded: 1982; 44 years ago
- Teams: 64
- Current champion: Florida State (5th title)
- Most championships: North Carolina (22 titles)
- Broadcaster(s): ESPNU; ESPN+
- Website: ncaa.com/soccer
- 2025 NCAA Division I women's soccer tournament

The NCAA Division I Women's Soccer Championship, sometimes known as the Women's College Cup, is an American college soccer tournament conducted by the National Collegiate Athletic Association (NCAA), and determines the Division I women's national champion.

== About the Tournament ==
The NCAA began conducting a single division Women's Soccer Championship tournament in 1982 with a 12-team tournament. The tournament became the Division I Championship in 1986, when Division III was created for non-scholarship programs. Currently, the tournament field consists of 64 teams. Of the 64 qualifying teams, 32 automatically receive bids for winning their conference. The remaining teams receiving bids receive "at large bids." At large bids are determined by the college soccer committee, who review multiple factors, such as The Ratings Percentage Index (RPI) in their decision process. At large bids are given to the teams in good conferences that may play harder teams, resulting in them not winning their conference but still having a high enough RPI to qualify for the tournament.

These bids are given at "The Selection Show", where teams find out if they receive a bid and what seed they are. Many teams will host watch parties together where they will sit and watch to see if their name is called. Some programs will invite fans to watch the selection show with their teams as well. Seeding determines whether a team will play games at home and how difficult their opponent will be in early round games. There are 4 number 1 seeds in the tournament that host all the games until the semifinals. The number 1 seeds of the 2025 tournament were Stanford, Notre Dame, Virginia, and Vanderbilt. Of those 4 teams, 3 were from ACC.

After the bracket is made, teams proceed to play single elimination games until there is a winner. The semifinals and final of the tournament, held at a single site every year, are collectively known as the Women's College Cup (analogous to the College Cup in men's soccer). In 2026, the tournament will be held at Cary, North Carolina's First Horizon Stadium at Wakemed Soccer Park. The Mens and Women's ACC conference championships are also hosted there. The 2026 tournament is taking place a week later than the 2025 tournament due to each team's regular season being longer.

== Historical and Conference Performance ==
Historically, North Carolina has been the dominant school in Division I women's soccer. Widely known as one of the most successful collegiate programs in any NCAA sport, the Tar Heels have won 22 national championships, out of the 43 NCAA tournaments contested. The Tar Heels have reached the College Cup 30 times. Former head coach Anson Dorrance (1979-2024) led North Carolina to all 22 of their titles (21 NCAA and 1 AIAW) and is considered one of the greatest soccer coaches in NCAA history. However, between 2021 to 2025 Florida State has won 3 titles. The ACC continues to be one of the most successful conferences in NCAA women's college soccer with 12 teams in the top 50 for RPI rankings as of October 22nd, 2026. As for the other power 4s (Big 10, Big 12, and SEC), the SEC has 11 teams in the top 50, where as Big 10 and Big 12 both have 8 in the top 50. These power 4s take majority of these top 50 rankings currently with 39/50 teams being from power 4s (ACC, SEC, Big 10, and Big 12). In the last 5 years of College Cups (the final 4 of the NCAA women's soccer tournament), 13/20 teams for the past 5 years have been teams from the ACC. In fact, there has not been a non-power 4 school in the college cup since 2021 when Santa Clara won the Championship.This championship was also different than many taking place in the Spring of 2021 due to Covid not allowing a tournament to be played in the fall of 2020.

== History of Success ==
Only seven other schools have won multiple titles: Florida State (5 titles, 3-time runner-up and 13 College Cup appearances), Notre Dame (3 titles, 5-time runner-up and 12 College Cup appearances), Stanford (3 titles, 2-time runner-up and 10 College Cup appearances), UCLA (2 titles, 4-time runner-up and 12 College Cup appearances), Santa Clara (2 titles, 1-time runner up and 11 College Cup appearances), Portland (2 titles, 1-time runner-up and 8 College Cup appearances), and USC (2 titles, 2 College Cup appearances). The only other programs that have won a national championship have been George Mason in 1985, Florida in 1998, and Penn State in 2015. For all time leading in ACC confrence championships it is none other than North Carolina with 22. For big 10, it is Penn State also with 20 regular season titles and 9 tournament titles. Next, for big 12, West Virginia has the most titles with 5 regular season title wins and 5 tournament title wins. Finally, for SEC, the Florida Gators lead the way with 14 regular season title wins and 12 tournament title wins. However, while North Carolina is the most dominant school in the NCAA historically they have also been in the NCAA the longest (1979). Where as Florida, Penn State, and West Virginia all joined from 1994-1996. As far as teams with the overall best RPI in the last 5 years, Florida State has the best overall in the last 5 years. Then it is Notre Dame, Stanford, Arkansas, and North Carolina. Of those top 5 teams of overall RPI in the last 4 years, 4 of them come from the ACC.

== Champions ==
Ed.	Year	Team Championship			Host city	Stadium	Third Place Final			Att.
Ed.	Year	Champion	Score	Runner-up	Host city	Stadium	Champion	Score	Runner-up	Att.
1	1982	North Carolina (1)	1–0	Central Florida	Orlando	UCF Knights	Connecticut	2–1	UMSL	1,000
2	1983	North Carolina (2)	4–0	George Mason	Orlando	UCF Knights	Massachusetts	1–0	Connecticut	700
3	1984	North Carolina (3)	2–0	Connecticut	Chapel Hill	Fetzer Field	Massachusetts	4–1	California	3,500
4	1985	George Mason (1)	2–0	North Carolina	Fairfax	George Mason Stadium	Colorado College, Massachusetts			4,500
5	1986	North Carolina (4)	2–0	Colorado College	Fairfax	George Mason Stadium	George Mason, Massachusetts			1,000
6	1987	North Carolina (5)	1–0	Massachusetts	Hadley	Warren McGuirk Stadium	California, UCF			3,651
7	1988	North Carolina (6)	4–1	NC State	Chapel Hill	Fetzer Field	California, Wisconsin			3,500
8	1989	North Carolina (7)	2–0	Colorado College	Raleigh	Method Road	NC State, Santa Clara			1,625
9	1990	North Carolina (8)	6–0	Connecticut	Chapel Hill	Fetzer Field	Colorado College, Santa Clara			3,200
10	1991	North Carolina (9)	3–1	Wisconsin	Chapel Hill	Fetzer Field	Colorado College, Virginia			3,800
11	1992	North Carolina (10)	9–1	Duke	Chapel Hill	Fetzer Field	Hartford, Santa Clara			3,573
12	1993	North Carolina (11)	6–0	George Mason	Chapel Hill	Fetzer Field	Massachusetts, Stanford			5,721
13	1994	North Carolina (12)	5–0	Notre Dame	Portland	Merlo Field	Connecticut, Portland			5,000
14	1995	Notre Dame (1)	1–0 (a.e.t.)	Portland	Chapel Hill	Fetzer Field	North Carolina, SMU			6,926
15	1996	North Carolina (13)	1–0 (a.e.t.)	Notre Dame	Santa Clara	Buck Shaw Stadium	Portland, Santa Clara			8,800
16	1997	North Carolina (14)	2–0	Connecticut	Greensboro	UNCG Soccer Stadium	Notre Dame, Santa Clara			3,200
17	1998	Florida (1)	1–0	North Carolina	Greensboro	UNCG Soccer Stadium	Portland, Santa Clara			10,583
18	1999	North Carolina (15)	2–0	Notre Dame	San Jose	Spartan Stadium	Penn State, Santa Clara			14,410
19	2000	North Carolina (16)	2–1	UCLA	San Jose	Spartan Stadium	Notre Dame, Portland			9,566
20	2001	Santa Clara (1)	1–0	North Carolina	University Park	Gerald J. Ford Stadium	Florida, Portland			7,090
21	2002	Portland (1)	2–1 (a.e.t.)	Santa Clara	Austin	Mike A. Myers Stadium	North Carolina, Penn State			10,027
22	2003	North Carolina (17)	6–0	Connecticut	Cary	SAS Soccer Park	Florida State, UCLA			10,042
23	2004	Notre Dame (2)	1–1 (4–3 p)	UCLA	Cary	SAS Soccer Park	Princeton, Santa Clara			7,644
24	2005	Portland (2)	4–0	UCLA	College Station	Aggie Soccer Stadium	Florida State, Penn State			6,578
25	2006	North Carolina (18)	2–1	Notre Dame	Cary	SAS Soccer Park	Florida State, UCLA			8,349
26	2007	USC (1)	2–0	Florida State	College Station	Aggie Soccer Stadium	Notre Dame, UCLA			8,255
27	2008	North Carolina (19)	2–1	Notre Dame	Cary	WakeMed Soccer Park	Stanford, UCLA			9,055
28	2009	North Carolina (20)	1–0	Stanford	College Station	Aggie Soccer Stadium	Notre Dame, UCLA			8,536
29	2010	Notre Dame (3)	1–0	Stanford	Cary	WakeMed Soccer Park	Boston College, Ohio State			7,833
30	2011	Stanford (1)	1–0	Duke	Kennesaw	Fifth Third Bank Stadium	Florida State, Wake Forest			9,241
31	2012	North Carolina (21)	4–1	Penn State	San Diego	Torero Stadium	Florida State, Stanford			7,289
32	2013	UCLA (1)	1–0 (a.e.t.)	Florida State	Cary	WakeMed Soccer Park	Virginia, Virginia Tech			8,806*
33	2014	Florida State (1)	1–0	Virginia	Boca Raton	FAU Stadium	Stanford, Texas A&M			4,137
34	2015	Penn State (1)	1–0	Duke	Cary	WakeMed Soccer Park	Florida State, Rutgers			10,676
35	2016	USC (2)	3–1	West Virginia	San Jose	Avaya Stadium	Georgetown, North Carolina			6,612
36	2017	Stanford (2)	3–2	UCLA	Orlando	Orlando City Stadium	South Carolina, Duke			1,938
37	2018	Florida State (2)	1–0	North Carolina	Cary	WakeMed Soccer Park	Stanford, Georgetown			12,512
38	2019	Stanford (3)	0–0 (5–4 p)	North Carolina	San Jose	Avaya Stadium	UCLA, Washington State			9,591 (Note: The reported attendance for 2013 is the number of tickets sold for the match. Actual game attendance was less than 3,000.)
39	2020	Santa Clara (2)	1–1 (4–1 p)	Florida State	Cary	WakeMed Soccer Park	North Carolina, Virginia			5,000
40	2021	Florida State (3)	0-0 (4–3 p)	BYU	Santa Clara	Stevens Stadium	Santa Clara, Rutgers			7,087
41	2022	UCLA (2)	3–2 (a.e.t.)	North Carolina	Cary	WakeMed Soccer Park	Florida State, Alabama			9,531
42	2023	Florida State (4)	5–1	Stanford	Cary	WakeMed Soccer Park	BYU, Clemson			3,954
43	2024	North Carolina (22)	1–0	Wake Forest	Cary	WakeMed Soccer Park	Duke, Stanford			9,475
44	2025	Florida State (5)	1–0	Stanford	Kansas City, MO	CPKC Stadium	TCU, Duke			3,311
45	2026				Cary	WakeMed Soccer Park				
46	2027				Cary	WakeMed Soccer Park				

== Team titles ==
National Championships by school: 22, 5, 3, 2, 1

Team	Titles	Years won
North Carolina	22	1982, 1983, 1984, 1986, 1987, 1988, 1989, 1990, 1991, 1992, 1993, 1994, 1996, 1997, 1999, 2000, 2003, 2006, 2008, 2009, 2012, 2024
Florida State	5	2014, 2018, 2021, 2023, 2025
Stanford	3	2011, 2017, 2019
Notre Dame	3	1995, 2004, 2010
Santa Clara	2	2001, 2020
USC	2	2007, 2016
Portland	2	2002, 2005
UCLA	2	2013, 2022
Penn State	1	2015
Florida	1	1998
George Mason	1	1985

== Performance by team ==
- CH National Champion
- RU National Runner-up
- SF Semifinals
- QF Quarterfinals
- 12 16 Round of 12 (1982 - 1992); Round of 16 (1993 - present)
- 24 32 Round of 24 (1993 - 1994); Round of 32 (1995 - present)
- ✖ First Round (Fewer than 64 teams invited before 1994.)

Starting in 2001, the NCAA started seeing the top 2 teams in each region. This expanded to the top 4 teams in each region in 2003, and the top 8 teams in each region in 2022. The teams' seeds are shown in superscript next to the result.

School	Conference (as of 2026)	#	16	QF	SF	CG	CH	82	83	84	85	86	87	88	89	90	91	92	93	94	95	96	97	98	99	00	01	02	03	04	05	06	07	08	09	10	11	12	13	14	15	16	17	18	19	20	21	22	23	24	25	26
North Carolina	ACC	45	42	35	32	28	22	CH	CH	CH	RU	CH	CH	CH	CH	CH	CH	CH	CH	CH	SF	CH	CH	RU	CH	CH	¹RU	¹SF	¹CH	¹16	¹QF	¹CH	¹16	¹CH	¹CH	¹16	³16	²CH	¹QF	²16	³32	²SF	¹16	¹RU	¹RU	¹SF	²✖	²RU	³QF	²CH	16	¹32
Florida State	ACC	27	22	19	15	8	5																			16	32	16	³SF	✖	²SF	²SF	³RU	²QF	¹QF	²QF	¹SF	¹SF	¹RU	¹CH	¹SF	³32	⁴16	¹CH	¹QF	¹RU	¹CH	¹SF	¹CH	¹32	³CH	⁵32
Notre Dame	ACC	32	23	17	12	8	3												16	RU	CH	RU	SF	QF	RU	SF	²32	16	¹32	¹CH	²QF	¹RU	⁴SF	¹RU	²SF	⁴CH	✖	QF	16	⁴16	³32	²✖	16		32		³16	¹QF	³32	⁴QF	¹32	²32
Stanford	ACC	35	24	18	13	7	3									12	QF	QF	SF	QF	24	32		✖	16	32	²16	¹QF	✖	32	✖	16	¹16	¹SF	¹RU	¹RU	¹CH	¹SF	16	¹SF	¹QF	¹32	¹CH	¹SF	¹CH		✖	³32	²RU	³SF	¹RU	⁵32
UCLA	Big Ten	30	22	17	12	6	2														24		QF	32	16	RU	¹QF	²16	¹SF	⁴RU	¹RU	²SF	¹SF	¹SF	¹SF	16	²32	³QF	²CH	¹QF		⁴16	²RU	²QF	²SF	¹16	²✖	¹CH	¹✖	²32	⁴32	⁵32
Santa Clara	West Coast	35	23	17	12	3	2								SF	SF	12	SF	16	24	QF	SF	SF	SF	SF	QF	¹CH	²RU	³QF	⁴SF	²QF	¹✖	✖		⁴16	32	✖	32	⁴16		⁴32	QF	16	³32	16	³CH	SF	⁸32	⁷32	32		✖
Portland	West Coast	22	16	14	8	3	2											12	QF	SF	RU	SF	32	SF		SF	¹SF	²CH	²16	²QF	¹CH	QF	²QF	²QF	²QF	¹32	32	⁴32	³32									⁸32				
USC	Big Ten	23	7	4	2	2	2																	32	32	32	✖	32	✖		32	32	²CH	⁴16	✖	32				✖	⁴16	²CH	³32	⁴16	²QF	²32	³32	⁴✖	⁸32	¹QF		
George Mason	Atlantic 10	11	10	5	4	3	1	12	RU	14	CH	SF		QF	12				RU	16		32	16																													
Penn State	Big Ten	32	22	15	5	2	1														24	16	32	QF	SF	QF	QF	SF	²QF	¹32	¹SF	²QF	¹16	✖	⁴32	32	⁴16	¹RU	⁴32	²QF	¹CH	32	³QF	QF	⁴16	16	16	²16	²QF	⁴QF	⁸32	⁶✖
Florida	SEC	22	13	6	2	1	1															QF	16	CH	32	32	²SF		¹QF	³✖	✖	³16	³16	²16	³32	²32	²32	²16	²32	²QF	²16	¹16	³QF		✖							
UConn	Big East	32	25	18	7	4	-	SF	SF	RU	14	QF	QF	12	12	RU	QF	12	QF	SF	QF	QF	RU	QF	QF	QF	²16	¹QF	RU	16	³✖	32	QF		32	✖				32	16	32								32		
Duke	ACC	31	21	15	6	3	-											RU	16	QF	16	16	32		32	32	32		³32	16	³32	32	QF	³QF	✖	16	¹RU	³QF	QF		³RU	³QF	¹SF	⁴16	32	³QF	¹QF	²QF		¹SF	²SF	³32
Colorado College	Mountain West	11	8	7	5	2	-			QF	SF	RU	12	QF	RU	SF	SF															✖						✖	✖													
UMass	MAC	15	14	10	6	1	-	QF	SF	SF	SF	SF	RU	QF	QF		12	QF	SF	16	16	16	32																													
Virginia	ACC	38	30	11	4	1	-						12	12	12	QF	SF	QF		24	16	32	16	32	16	16	QF	16	²32	¹32	²QF	16	⁴16	²16	16	²16	²QF	²16	¹SF	²RU	¹QF	³16	³16	³16	¹32	SF	¹16	³QF		⁴32	¹16	²32
NC State	ACC	17	13	8	2	1	-				QF	QF	QF	RU	SF	QF	QF	12		16	QF	32																				16	32	16	16		32	⁸✖				
BYU	Big 12	27	10	5	2	1	-																32	16	32	16	32	✖	QF		⁴✖	✖	✖	32	32	✖		¹QF	32	✖	32	⁴16		✖	²QF	³32	⁴RU	⁶16	¹SF	⁷✖	⁵16	³32
UCF	Big 12	24	7	5	2	1	-	RU		QF			SF	QF			12							✖	32		✖	✖	✖	32			32	32	³32	⁴32	QF	32	³✖	16	✖		²✖					32			⁷32	✖
Wisconsin	Big Ten	27	13	4	2	1	-				14			SF	12	QF	RU		QF	24	16	16		32		32		32		32	✖				16	32		✖		⁴32		32	32	16	³16		16		⁴32	⁵16	⁴32	32
Wake Forest	ACC	25	7	3	2	1	-															16	32	✖	16	32	✖	32	✖	✖	✖	³32	⁴32	³32	³QF	⁴32	¹SF	³32	16				32	16			32	✖		²RU	⁷32	²32
West Virginia	Big 12	25	7	3	1	1	-																			✖	✖	²32	²16	32	32	✖	⁴QF	32	32	³16	✖	✖	32	³✖	²QF	¹RU	²16	²32	16	²32		⁷32		✖	⁷32	⁷32
California	ACC	28	7	5	3	-	-		QF	SF		QF	SF	SF					16					✖	✖	32	✖	32		✖	³16	32	32	✖	32	✖	32	32	✖	32	³✖	✖	✖		✖			✖		32		
Georgetown	Big East	16	5	3	2	-	-																										✖			QF		32	32	32	✖	²SF	✖	¹SF	✖	⁴16	³32	⁵32	³32	⁶32	²16	
Rutgers	Big Ten	19	5	2	2	-	-						12														16		32			³32		16	32			32	✖	32	²SF	32	32	✖	⁴✖	32	¹SF	⁵✖	✖	⁶✖		
Texas A&M	SEC	28	16	7	1	-	-														16	32	32	32	16	16	QF	QF	16	³32	⁴16	²QF	²32	³QF	16	⁴32	³32	16	⁴16	¹SF	QF	32	²32	³16	32	²QF		✖	⁸32			
Clemson	ACC	26	9	6	1	-	-													24	24	32	QF	16	QF	QF	16	✖	✖	✖	✖	QF	32							✖	²32	³16	32	✖	32	⁴QF	✖	⁵✖	¹SF		⁸32	⁶32
Boston College	ACC	19	13	5	1	-	-	12	QF	14	QF														16		✖		⁴✖	16	16	16	✖	³16	²QF	²SF	⁴16	32	QF		✖			⁴✖								
Hartford	D3	13	8	5	1	-	-								QF	12	QF	SF		QF	24		16	16	QF	32	✖	✖				✖																				
South Carolina	SEC	20	7	5	1	-	-																	✖									✖	✖	²16	32	32		³32	³QF	✖	¹QF	¹SF	³32	²QF	32	QF	³16	⁷32	³32	✖	⁴32
Ohio State	Big Ten	20	6	3	1	-	-																					✖	32	²QF			✖		✖	³SF	16	⁴✖	✖		16	32	⁴✖	✖		32	✖	⁶32	✖	³16	QF	¹32
Princeton	Ivy League	16	4	3	1	-	-	QF	12																✖	✖	32	✖	✖	²SF				✖				32			32		⁴QF	✖			32		⁷32	✖		
Virginia Tech	ACC	15	6	2	1	-	-																							✖				✖	³16	✖	16	✖	¹SF	16	⁴32			16	✖		32	✖		⁷QF		32
TCU	Big 12	9	4	2	1	-	-																																			✖	✖	32	✖	¹QF	⁴16	⁵16		⁵32	²SF	
SMU	ACC	14	6	1	1	-	-									12		12	16		SF		16		16		32	32	✖	✖	32	32										✖					32					
Washington State	Pac-12	14	3	1	1	-	-													16						✖		✖						✖	32		32	✖	✖	✖	✖		16	32	SF		32					
UMSL	D2	2	2	1	1	-	-	SF	12																																											
Alabama	SEC	8	1	1	1	-	-																	✖													✖						✖				32	¹SF	⁶32		⁸32	⁴32
William & Mary	CAA	25	13	5	-	-	-			14	14	12	QF	12	QF	12		QF	16	QF	24	32	QF	16	16	✖	32	✖	✖	32		✖	32	32			✖				32											
UC Santa Barbara	Big West	10	7	5	-	-	-			14	QF	QF	QF		QF	QF	12																	✖	✖															✖		
Nebraska	Big Ten	13	9	3	-	-	-															QF	16	16	QF	16	16	16	32	16	32								²32			32							⁵QF			
Washington	Big Ten	19	8	3	-	-	-													16	16	32		✖		16	32		✖	⁴QF				32	32	QF		✖		⁴16	✖				⁴32	16				32	⁴QF	32
Michigan	Big Ten	17	6	3	-	-	-																32	32	32	32	32	QF	16	✖		✖				✖		⁴16	³QF			✖			16		²QF		✖			⁶32
Harvard	Ivy League	19	4	3	-	-	-	QF		QF										24		32	QF	32	32	16	32			✖				✖	✖		✖		✖	32		✖					✖	⁶32	⁴32			
Cortland	D2	4	4	3	-	-	-	QF	QF	14	QF																																									
Brown	Ivy League	11	6	2	-	-	-	12	QF	QF	14	12								16																									32		✖	32	³32			✖
Maryland	Big Ten	13	5	2	-	-	-														QF	QF	32	32	32		✖	32	✖	16					⁴16	¹32	16	32														
Arkansas	SEC	13	5	2	-	-	-																																16	32		32	✖	32	³32	²16	²QF	³QF	²32	²16	⁵32	⁷✖
Baylor	Big 12	8	4	2	-	-	-																	32	✖												32	³16					QF	²QF							⁵16	²32
Oklahoma State	Big 12	14	3	2	-	-	-																						✖			⁴32	32	⁴32	32	³QF	²QF		✖	✖		✖	32		³32	³16				✖		
Tennessee	SEC	18	7	1	-	-	-																				✖	16	⁴16	³16	32	⁴16	³16	✖			⁴✖	✖					32	²QF			³16	⁶✖	32	✖	³✖	⁸32
Vanderbilt	SEC	15	5	1	-	-	-													16	16	16	32	32							✖	✖											32	32	✖	⁴32		32		⁸16	¹QF	¹32
Illinois	Big Ten	13	4	1	-	-	-																			32	✖		⁴✖	QF	32	³16	32	16		✖	32	32	16												✖	
Dartmouth	Ivy League	11	4	1	-	-	-												16	24		32		QF	32	16	16	✖	✖		✖																				✖	
Michigan State	Big Ten	9	3	1	-	-	-																					✖			32			32	✖													⁴32	⁵16	⁵16	²QF	¹32
Auburn	SEC	19	2	1	-	-	-																				✖	32	32	32		✖	✖	32	✖	✖	³32	32		32	⁴16	⁴QF	32	✖			⁴✖			⁶32		⁸✖
Pittsburgh	ACC	2	2	1	-	-	-																																									⁴16	⁷QF			
Long Beach State	Big West	7	1	1	-	-	-																											✖		✖	QF	✖			✖	✖		✖								
FIU	CUSA	3	1	1	-	-	-												QF																		✖													✖		
Texas	SEC	19	5	-	-	-	-																				✖	✖	✖	³16	✖	¹16	16	32		✖	✖			32			⁴16	⁴✖	✖		✖	⁷32	⁵16	⁴32		⁵✖
Pepperdine	West Coast	15	4	-	-	-	-																				32	¹16	32	✖	⁴16						³✖	✖		⁴16		32	32		✖		⁴16	✖		⁷✖	✖	
Minnesota	Big Ten	12	4	-	-	-	-														24	32	16	32	32									16		16			✖		32	⁴✖		32						⁶16		
Colorado	Big 12	16	3	-	-	-	-																						³✖	32	32	⁴16	32	⁴✖					16	32		32	32		32	✖			✖	32	³16	³32
James Madison	Sun Belt	13	3	-	-	-	-														16	16	32	32	32			32		✖			32	16		32					✖								✖	✖		
Marquette	Big East	13	3	-	-	-	-																		32	32	✖	✖			⁴16	32		✖	✖	³16	32	⁴16	²✖			✖										
Kansas	Big 12	12	3	-	-	-	-																				✖		⁴16	²32				32			✖			✖		32		32	³16					✖	³16	⁴32
Northwestern	Big Ten	8	3	-	-	-	-															32		16																	32	16	32	✖				⁴16			✖	
Cincinnati	Big 12	7	3	-	-	-	-		12			12								24			32				16	32													✖											
UC Irvine	Big West	5	3	-	-	-	-																													16	✖										32	16	16			
San Diego	West Coast	13	2	-	-	-	-															16			32	✖	✖	✖	✖	32			✖	32	✖	✖	16			✖												
Georgia	SEC	13	2	-	-	-	-																32	16			32		32				³32	✖	32		32			✖								⁷32	⁴16	⁷✖	⁸✖	
Memphis	American	13	2	-	-	-	-																										✖	✖	✖	✖	⁴32					✖		✖	✖	✖	32	16	⁶16		⁷32	
Texas Tech	Big 12	11	2	-	-	-	-																															32	32	³16	32	✖		32	⁴32				²16	⁸32	⁶32	³32
Ole Miss	SEC	10	2	-	-	-	-																					✖	32		✖				✖				32		16		✖	32		16	✖					
San Diego State	Pac-12	7	2	-	-	-	-																	16	✖										32			²16	✖	✖			✖									
Arizona	Big 12	7	2	-	-	-	-																							⁴✖	16									32	16		32	32	32							
Mississippi State	SEC	6	2	-	-	-	-																																					✖				⁷32	⁶16	¹16	⁶✖	⁷32
Saint Mary's	West Coast	3	2	-	-	-	-							12						16							32																									
Cal State East Bay	D2	2	2	-	-	-	-				14	12																																								
Kentucky	SEC	14	1	-	-	-	-														24	32		✖	32		✖	✖				✖					✖	32	32	³16										⁵32	✖	⁷✖
Denver	West Coast	12	1	-	-	-	-																				✖	✖	✖			32	✖	✖	✖			16	⁴✖				✖	✖		32						
UNC Greensboro	SoCon	11	1	-	-	-	-															32	16	✖		32	✖		32			✖	32			✖							✖	✖								
Dayton	Atlantic 10	11	1	-	-	-	-																		32		16	✖	✖	✖					32	32	✖			✖		✖									✖	
LSU	SEC	11	1	-	-	-	-																										32	✖	⁴32		✖				✖			32			✖	⁸32	✖	✖	⁴16	
Radford	Big South	10	1	-	-	-	-				14													✖				✖						✖			✖	✖						✖	✖			✖	✖			
Saint Louis	Atlantic 10	10	1	-	-	-	-																								32	32												✖	✖	⁴32	32	²✖	⁶16	⁸32		32
Cal State Fullerton	Big West	9	1	-	-	-	-																				✖				³16	32	✖						✖	✖	✖		✖		✖							
Purdue	Big Ten	8	1	-	-	-	-																					32	16		✖	✖	²32		✖												32					⁴32
Utah	Big 12	8	1	-	-	-	-																					32	✖	✖	✖	⁴32							✖			16			✖							
Louisville	ACC	8	1	-	-	-	-																									✖	✖				16		✖					✖	32						⁶32	⁸✖
South Florida	American	8	1	-	-	-	-																													32				✖	✖		32	32	16	32	✖					
Villanova	Big East	7	1	-	-	-	-																				32	✖	16	32		32			✖																	32
Iowa	Big Ten	6	1	-	-	-	-																																✖						✖	32			⁵32	³16	⁵32	
Indiana	Big Ten	5	1	-	-	-	-															32		32									16						32										✖			
Rice	American	5	1	-	-	-	-																							✖	✖									✖			✖			16						
Oregon State	Pac-12	4	1	-	-	-	-													24															16	32	✖															
St. John's	Big East	4	1	-	-	-	-																												✖				32		✖						16					
Providence	Big East	3	1	-	-	-	-												16																												✖		✖			
Loyola Marymount	West Coast	3	1	-	-	-	-																					✖				✖									16											
Yale	Ivy League	3	1	-	-	-	-																					32		✖	16																					
Vermont	America East	2	1	-	-	-	-			14																																					✖					
Richmond	Atlantic 10	2	1	-	-	-	-																			32		16																								
Rochester	D3	1	1	-	-	-	-	12																																												
Keene State	D3	1	1	-	-	-	-		12																																											
Barry	D2	1	1	-	-	-	-						12																																							
Milwaukee	Horizon	20	-	-	-	-	-																32				✖	✖			32	32		✖	✖	✖	32	✖	✖					✖	✖	32	32	✖	✖	✖	✖	✖
Boston University	Patriot	16	-	-	-	-	-																			32	✖		✖		32	✖	✖	✖	✖	✖	32		32	✖	32			✖						✖		✖
Central Connecticut	NEC	13	-	-	-	-	-																	✖				✖	32	✖	✖			✖						✖				✖	32	✖	✖	✖				✖
Arizona State	Big 12	10	-	-	-	-	-																			32		32	32						✖	✖		✖		32						32		✖	✖			
Liberty	CUSA	10	-	-	-	-	-																			✖	✖				✖								✖		✖	✖				✖			✖		✖	✖
Hofstra	CAA	10	-	-	-	-	-																								✖		32			32		✖			32		✖	32	32		32	✖				
Samford	SoCon	10	-	-	-	-	-																								32		✖				✖					✖			✖		32	✖		✖	✖	✖
Xavier	Big East	8	-	-	-	-	-																	✖		✖																			32		✖	32	⁴✖		⁶32	⁸32
Furman	SoCon	8	-	-	-	-	-																		✖	✖		✖		✖			✖						✖		✖					✖						
Oakland	Horizon	8	-	-	-	-	-																				✖	✖	✖			✖	✖				✖	32			✖											
High Point	Big South	8	-	-	-	-	-																						✖				✖		✖	✖				✖			✖				✖				✖	
Monmouth	CAA	8	-	-	-	-	-																										✖		✖				✖			✖	✖	✖	✖		✖					
South Dakota State	Summit	8	-	-	-	-	-																											32						✖	✖	✖			✖		✖			✖	✖	
Florida Gulf Coast	ASUN	8	-	-	-	-	-																														✖	✖		✖	32	✖	✖					✖	✖			
South Alabama	Sun Belt	8	-	-	-	-	-																																✖	✖	32	✖	✖		✖	32	✖					
Missouri	SEC	7	-	-	-	-	-																		✖				32				32	⁴32				✖		32		✖										
Montana	Big Sky	7	-	-	-	-	-																		✖	32											✖							✖		✖	✖				✖	
Bucknell	Patriot	7	-	-	-	-	-																				✖				✖											✖	✖				✖	✖	✖			
Loyola (MD)	Patriot	7	-	-	-	-	-																				✖	✖	✖	✖			✖		✖			✖														
Illinois State	Missouri Valley	7	-	-	-	-	-																						✖						✖		✖	✖	32	32		32										
Loyola Chicago	Atlantic 10	7	-	-	-	-	-																						✖			✖	✖											✖	✖	✖	✖					
North Texas	American	7	-	-	-	-	-																							✖	✖							✖			✖		✖	✖	✖							
Colgate	Patriot	6	-	-	-	-	-																32	✖	✖					32					✖			✖														
Fairfield	Metro	6	-	-	-	-	-																32	✖	✖						✖			✖																✖		
Cal Poly	Big West	6	-	-	-	-	-																		32	✖		✖	✖	✖																					✖	
Western Michigan	MAC	6	-	-	-	-	-																						32										32		✖									✖	✖	✖
Bowling Green	MAC	6	-	-	-	-	-																							✖	✖													✖	✖	✖	✖					
Utah State	Pac-12	6	-	-	-	-	-																														✖	✖											✖	⁸✖	✖	⁶32
Utah Valley	Big West	6	-	-	-	-	-																																		✖		✖			32		✖			✖	✖
Lipscomb	ASUN	6	-	-	-	-	-																																					32	✖		✖			✖	32	✖
Charlotte	American	5	-	-	-	-	-																	32				✖					✖	32								✖										
Evansville	Missouri Valley	5	-	-	-	-	-																	✖	✖		✖							✖							✖											
Idaho State	Big Sky	5	-	-	-	-	-																				✖	✖	32			✖						✖														
Miami (FL)	ACC	5	-	-	-	-	-																				✖						✖	✖			32	✖														
Texas State	Pac-12	5	-	-	-	-	-																				✖			✖				✖			✖														✖	
Creighton	Big East	5	-	-	-	-	-																					✖		✖	✖		✖			✖																
Navy	Patriot	5	-	-	-	-	-																						✖			32	✖												✖	✖						
Oklahoma	SEC	5	-	-	-	-	-																						✖							✖				✖		32										✖
Old Dominion	Sun Belt	5	-	-	-	-	-																									✖															✖	✖	✖			✖
Toledo	MAC	5	-	-	-	-	-																									✖	✖	✖			✖						✖									
Morehead State	Ohio Valley	5	-	-	-	-	-																											✖		✖			✖										✖	✖		
La Salle	Atlantic 10	5	-	-	-	-	-																														✖	✖	✖	✖			✖									
Stony Brook	CAA	5	-	-	-	-	-																															✖					✖		✖	✖				✖		
Seattle	West Coast	5	-	-	-	-	-																																✖	32		✖		✖	✖							
SIU Edwardsville	Ohio Valley	5	-	-	-	-	-																																	✖		32				✖	✖	✖				
Fresno State	Pac-12	4	-	-	-	-	-																		✖						✖			✖		✖																
LIU	NEC	4	-	-	-	-	-																		✖							✖					✖	✖														
Penn	Ivy League	4	-	-	-	-	-																		✖		✖						✖			✖																
Miami (OH)	MAC	4	-	-	-	-	-																			✖	32	32										32														
Missouri State	CUSA	4	-	-	-	-	-																			✖																	✖					✖		✖		
Quinnipiac	Metro	4	-	-	-	-	-																			✖																						✖	✖			✖
San Jose State	Mountain West	4	-	-	-	-	-																			✖															✖			✖				✖				
Eastern Illinois	Ohio Valley	4	-	-	-	-	-																				✖	✖	✖	✖																						
Stephen F. Austin	Southland	4	-	-	-	-	-																						✖				✖					✖												✖		
UNLV	Mountain West	4	-	-	-	-	-																							✖	✖	✖										✖										
Weber State	Big Sky	4	-	-	-	-	-																							✖	32								✖													✖
Northeastern	CAA	4	-	-	-	-	-																											32					✖	32		✖										
Northern Arizona	Big Sky	4	-	-	-	-	-																											✖	✖					✖								✖				
Murray State	Missouri Valley	4	-	-	-	-	-																												✖						✖		✖	✖								
Southeastern Louisiana	Southland	4	-	-	-	-	-																												✖				✖		✖					✖						
Jackson State	SWAC	4	-	-	-	-	-																													✖			✖									✖				✖
New Mexico	Mountain West	4	-	-	-	-	-																													✖	✖									32	✖					
Saint Francis (PA)	D3	4	-	-	-	-	-																													✖			✖			✖	✖									
Lamar	Southland	4	-	-	-	-	-																																				✖		✖			✖				✖
Wright State	Horizon	3	-	-	-	-	-																	✖	✖	✖																										
Elon	CAA	3	-	-	-	-	-																		✖																					✖					✖	
Jacksonville	ASUN	3	-	-	-	-	-																			✖						✖							✖													
Northwestern State	Southland	3	-	-	-	-	-																					✖			✖																✖					
DePaul	Big East	3	-	-	-	-	-																						✖										✖	✖												
UAB	American	3	-	-	-	-	-																							32		✖																				✖
Mississippi Valley State	SWAC	3	-	-	-	-	-																								✖			✖				✖														
Valparaiso	Missouri Valley	3	-	-	-	-	-																								✖									✖									✖			
Western Carolina	SoCon	3	-	-	-	-	-																								✖			✖															✖			
Grambling State	SWAC	3	-	-	-	-	-																									✖																	✖		✖	
Sacramento State	Big West	3	-	-	-	-	-																										✖			✖														✖		
Army	Patriot	3	-	-	-	-	-																											✖			✖														✖	
Central Michigan	MAC	3	-	-	-	-	-																												32	✖		✖														
UNC Wilmington	CAA	3	-	-	-	-	-																												✖						32											✖
Siena	Metro	3	-	-	-	-	-																													✖					✖					✖						
UTSA	American	3	-	-	-	-	-																													✖												✖			✖	
UT Martin	Ohio Valley	3	-	-	-	-	-																														✖	✖														✖
Houston Christian	Southland	3	-	-	-	-	-																																	✖		✖									✖	
Prairie View A&M	SWAC	3	-	-	-	-	-																																	✖					✖		✖					
Albany	America East	3	-	-	-	-	-																																		✖	✖		✖								
Butler	Big East	3	-	-	-	-	-																																		✖		✖				✖					
Howard	MEAC	3	-	-	-	-	-																																		✖			✖						✖		
Alabama State	SWAC	3	-	-	-	-	-																																			✖	✖			✖						
Maine	America East	3	-	-	-	-	-																																										✖	✖	✖	
Syracuse	ACC	2	-	-	-	-	-																	32			32																									
Sacred Heart	Metro	2	-	-	-	-	-																				✖																								✖	
Campbell	CAA	2	-	-	-	-	-																							✖																✖						
Oral Roberts	Summit	2	-	-	-	-	-																							✖																						✖
VCU	Atlantic 10	2	-	-	-	-	-																							✖	32																					
Gonzaga	Pac-12	2	-	-	-	-	-																								✖																		⁸32			
Columbia	Ivy League	2	-	-	-	-	-																									✖																	⁸32			
Southeast Missouri State	Ohio Valley	2	-	-	-	-	-																									✖	✖																			
UNC Asheville	Big South	2	-	-	-	-	-																									✖																				✖
Kennesaw State	CUSA	2	-	-	-	-	-																										✖		✖																	
Belmont	Missouri Valley	2	-	-	-	-	-																											✖											✖							
Arkansas–Pine Bluff	SWAC	2	-	-	-	-	-																												✖		✖															
Boise State	Pac-12	2	-	-	-	-	-																												✖										✖							
IU Indy	Horizon	2	-	-	-	-	-																												✖								✖									
Mercer	SoCon	2	-	-	-	-	-																													✖				✖												
Buffalo	MAC	2	-	-	-	-	-																																	✖								✖				
New Hampshire	America East	2	-	-	-	-	-																																	✖								✖				
Fairleigh Dickinson	NEC	2	-	-	-	-	-																																		✖							✖				
Northern Colorado	Big Sky	2	-	-	-	-	-																																		✖				✖							
Eastern Washington	Big Sky	2	-	-	-	-	-																																			✖	✖									
Abilene Christian	UAC	2	-	-	-	-	-																																					✖								✖
Grand Canyon	Mountain West	2	-	-	-	-	-																																								✖		✖			
California Baptist	Big West	2	-	-	-	-	-																																											✖	✖	
George Washington	Atlantic 10	1	-	-	-	-	-															32																														
Pacific	West Coast	1	-	-	-	-	-																	32																												
Eastern Michigan	MAC	1	-	-	-	-	-																		✖																											
Holy Cross	Patriot	1	-	-	-	-	-																			✖																										
American	Patriot	1	-	-	-	-	-																					✖																								
Rhode Island	Atlantic 10	1	-	-	-	-	-																					32																								
Binghamton	America East	1	-	-	-	-	-																							✖																						
Birmingham–Southern	defunct	1	-	-	-	-	-																							✖																						
Detroit Mercy	Horizon	1	-	-	-	-	-																							32																						
Florida Atlantic	American	1	-	-	-	-	-																								✖																					
Iowa State	Big 12	1	-	-	-	-	-																								✖																					
UC Riverside	Big West	1	-	-	-	-	-																								✖																					
UTEP	Mountain West	1	-	-	-	-	-																								32																					
Drake	Missouri Valley	1	-	-	-	-	-																									✖																				
McNeese	Southland	1	-	-	-	-	-																									✖																				
Nevada	Mountain West	1	-	-	-	-	-																									✖																				
Niagara	Metro	1	-	-	-	-	-																									✖																				
Alabama A&M	SWAC	1	-	-	-	-	-																										✖																			
Hawaii	Mountain West	1	-	-	-	-	-																										✖																			
Davidson	Atlantic 10	1	-	-	-	-	-																												✖																	
Lehigh	Patriot	1	-	-	-	-	-																													✖																
Middle Tennessee	CUSA	1	-	-	-	-	-																													✖																
North Dakota State	Summit	1	-	-	-	-	-																													✖																
Marist	Metro	1	-	-	-	-	-																														✖															
Cal State Northridge	Big West	1	-	-	-	-	-																															✖														
Georgia Southern	Sun Belt	1	-	-	-	-	-																															✖														
UMBC	America East	1	-	-	-	-	-																																✖													
Rider	Metro	1	-	-	-	-	-																																	✖												
Duquesne	Atlantic 10	1	-	-	-	-	-																																		✖											
Kent State	MAC	1	-	-	-	-	-																																			✖										
Northern Kentucky	Horizon	1	-	-	-	-	-																																			✖										
Little Rock	UAC	1	-	-	-	-	-																																					✖								
New Mexico State	CUSA	1	-	-	-	-	-																																									✖				
Omaha	Summit	1	-	-	-	-	-																																									✖				
Idaho	Big Sky	1	-	-	-	-	-																																										✖			
Ohio	MAC	1	-	-	-	-	-																																										✖			
Towson	CAA	1	-	-	-	-	-																																										✖			
East Carolina	American	1	-	-	-	-	-																																											✖		
Southern	SWAC	1	-	-	-	-	-																																											✖		
USC Upstate	Big South	1	-	-	-	-	-																																											✖		
Tennessee Tech	SoCon	1	-	-	-	-	-																																												✖	
UIC	Missouri Valley	1	-	-	-	-	-																																												✖	
Wagner	NEC	1	-	-	-	-	-																																												✖	
Air Force	Mountain West	1	-	-	-	-	-																																													✖
Bryant	America East	1	-	-	-	-	-																																													✖
Houston	Big 12	1	-	-	-	-	-																																													32
Southern Illinois	Missouri Valley	1	-	-	-	-	-																																													✖

== See also ==
- AIAW Intercollegiate Women's Soccer Champions
- NCAA Women's Soccer Championships (Division II, Division III)
- NCAA Men's Soccer Championships (Division I, Division II, Division III)
- NAIA Women's Soccer Championship
- Intercollegiate Soccer Football Association
- NCAA Division I Women's Soccer Championship bids by school
