= Betsy Drambour =

American soccer player and golfer (born 1965)

Personal information
- Full name: Elizabeth Merle Drambour
- Date of birth: August 1, 1965 (age 61)
- Place of birth: New York State, U.S.
- Position: Defender

Youth career
- 1979–1982: Shenendehowa Plainsmen

College career
Years	Team	Apps	(Gls)
1983–1986	George Mason Patriots	84	

International career
1986–1987	United States	7	(0)

Managerial career
- 1988: Catholic University Cardinals
- Adirondack Lynx (assistant)
- Ballston Spa Scotties
- Capital United Premier Soccer
- Albany Alleycats
- Saratoga Springs HS (assistant)

Elizabeth Merle Drambour (born August 1, 1965) is an American former soccer player who played as a defender, making seven appearances for the United States women's national team. She is also a semi-professional golfer.

== Soccer career ==
Drambour played for the Shenendehowa Plainsmen in high school, and was selected as an All-American in 1981 and 1982. In college, she played for the George Mason Patriots from 1983 to 1986. She was an NSCAA Second-Team All-American in 1985 and 1986, and was included in the NSCAA All-Region Team in 1986. She was included in the NCAA All-Tournament Team in the championship-winning 1985 edition, where she was the most outstanding defensive player, as well as in 1986. In toal, she recorded 24 assists in 84 appearances for the Patriots. During her career she also competed at the Empire State Games.

Drambour made her international debut for the United States on July 7, 1986, in the 1986 North America Cup against Canada. In total, she made seven appearances for the U.S., earning her final exactly one year later against the same opponent in the North America Cup.

Drambour later began coaching, and was the head coach of the Catholic University Cardinals women's soccer team in 1988. She served as an assistant for the Adirondack Lynx, and also coached the girls' teams of Ballston Spa High School, Saratoga Springs High School, Capital United Premier Soccer, and the Albany Alleycats. She also served as the coach of the Adirondack Region in the 2010 Empire State Games.

She was inducted into the Shenendehowa Athletic Hall of Fame in 2010, as well as the New York State High School Girls Soccer Hall of Fame in 2017.

== Golfing career ==
After her soccer career, Drambour began to play golf. In her first ever USGA event, she managed to reach the final of the U.S. Women's Amateur Public Links in June 1995. However, she ultimately lost to Jo Jo Robertson. She also played golf on the LPGA Futures Tour.

== Personal life ==
Drambour currently resides in Ballston Spa, New York.

== Career statistics ==
=== International ===
United States
Year	Apps	Goals
1986	6	0
1987	1	0
Total	7	0
