= 1982 NCAA women's soccer tournament =

Women's College Cup (semifinals & final)

Tournament details
- Country: United States
- Dates: November 4–21, 1982
- Teams: 12

Final positions
- Champions: North Carolina Tar Heels; (1st title, 1st College Cup)
- Runner-up: Central Florida Knights; (1st title game, 1st College Cup)
- Third place: Connecticut Huskies; (1st College Cup)
- Fourth place: Missouri–Saint Louis Tritons; (1st College Cup)

Tournament statistics
- Matches played: 12
- Goals scored: 36 (3 per match)
- Attendance: 3,061 (255 per match)
- Top goal scorer(s): Mary Varas, UCF (2); Donna MacDougall, UConn (2); Synthia Scott, UNC (2)

Awards
- Best player: Mary Varas, UCF (offense); Linda Gancitano, UCF (defense)
- All statistics correct as of 4/16/2015.

The 1982 NCAA Women's Soccer Tournament was the first annual single-elimination tournament, played during November 1982, to determine the national champion of NCAA women's collegiate soccer. The championship game was played at the University of Central Florida in Orlando, Florida on November 21, 1982.

North Carolina defeated Central Florida in the final, 2–0, to win their first national title. This was the first of North Carolina head coach Anson Dorrance's 21 national championships with the Tar Heels (as of 2019).

The most outstanding offensive player was Mary Varas (Central Florida), and the most outstanding defensive player was Linda Gancitano (Central Florida). There was no All-Tournament team named this year. Three players, with 2 goals each, were the leading scorers of the tournament. The most valuable player was goalkeeper Kim Wyant (Central Florida).

== Qualification ==
At the time, there was only one NCAA championship for women's soccer; a Division III title was added in 1986 and a Division II title in 1988. Hence, all NCAA women's soccer programs (whether from Division I, Division II, or Division III) were eligible for this championship. A total of 12 teams were ultimately invited to contest this tournament.

Team	Appearance	Previous	Record
Boston College	1st	Never	11-2-1
Brown	1st	Never	10-3
Central Florida	1st	Never	08-0-2
Connecticut	1st	Never	14-0-1
Cortland State	1st	Never	07-5-3
George Mason	1st	Never	14-4-1
Harvard	1st	Never	06-4-2
Massachusetts	1st	Never	14-3
Missouri–Saint Louis	1st	Never	16-2-1
North Carolina	1st	Never	16-2
Princeton	1st	Never	10-1-1
Rochester (NY)	1st	Never	12-3-1

== Bracket ==
First Round; Campus Sites; November 4–6
Cortland State	3
Boston College	0
Massachusetts	3
Rochester	1
Princeton	1
George Mason	0
Harvard (2OT)	3
Brown	1

Second Round; Campus Sites; November 12–13
Connecticut (2OT)	2
Cortland State	0
Central Florida	2
Massachusetts	1
North Carolina	4
Princeton	0
UM–Saint Louis	2
Harvard	1

Semifinals; Orlando, Florida; November 19
Connecticut	1
Central Florida	3
North Carolina	2
UM–Saint Louis	1

Championship; Orlando, Florida; November 21
Central Florida	0
North Carolina	2
Third place
Connecticut	2
UM–Saint Louis	1

== Tournament scoring leaders ==
Player (Team)	Goals	Assists	Points
Mary Vargas (Central Florida)	2	0	4
Donna MacDougall (Connecticut)	2	0	4
Synthia Scott (North Carolina)	2	0	4
Moira Buckley (Connecticut)	0	4	4
Laura Mayer (Harvard)	1	2	4

== See also ==
- NCAA Division I women's soccer championship
- 1982 NCAA Division I Men's Soccer Championship
