= Cindy Mosley =

American soccer player (born 1975)

Personal information
- Full name: Cynthia Erin Mosley
- Birth name: Cynthia Erin Daws
- Date of birth: October 1, 1975 (age 51)
- Place of birth: Los Angeles, California, United States
- Height: 5 ft 8 in (1.73 m)
- Position: Midfielder

College career
Years	Team	Apps	(Gls)
1993–1996	Notre Dame Fighting Irish	94	(61)

Senior career*
Years	Team	Apps	(Gls)
1997–1998	Suzuyo Shimizu F.C.		

International career
1997	United States	2	(0)
- * Club domestic league appearances and goals

Cynthia Erin Mosley (née Daws; born October 1, 1975) is an American former soccer player. A midfielder, she played for the Suzuyo Shimizu F.C. Lovely Ladies of Japan's L. League and won two caps for the senior United States women's national soccer team.

In college soccer with the Notre Dame Fighting Irish, Daws scored a record 61 goals and won the Hermann Trophy, the Honda Sports Award as the nation's top female soccer player, and the Honda-Broderick Cup as the nation's top female athlete. She married former Notre Dame football player Emmett Mosley IV and had four children: Jalyn, Emmett V, a wide receiver at Texas, Trent, a wide receiver at USC, and Grant West Hills-born Daws suffered from a persistent foot injury.
