= 1983 NCAA women's soccer tournament =

Women's College Cup (semifinals & final)

Tournament details
- Country: United States
- Teams: 12

Final positions
- Champions: North Carolina Tar Heels; (2nd title, 2nd College Cup)
- Runner-up: George Mason Patriots; (1st title game, 1st College Cup)
- Third place: UMass Minutewomen; (1st College Cup)
- Fourth place: Connecticut Huskies; (2nd College Cup)

Tournament statistics
- Matches played: 12
- Goals scored: 39 (3.25 per match)
- Attendance: 2,598 (217 per match)
- Top goal scorer(s): April Heinrichs, UNC (4)

Awards
- Best player: Chris Taggert, UMass (Overall); Lisa Gmitter, GMU (offense); Sue Cobb, UNC (defense)
- All statistics correct as of 4/18/2015.

The 1983 NCAA Women's Soccer Tournament was the second annual single-elimination tournament to determine the national champion of NCAA women's collegiate soccer. The championship game was again played at the University of Central Florida in Orlando, Florida during December 1983.

North Carolina defeated George Mason in the final, 4–0, to win their second national title. The Tar Heels were coached by Anson Dorrance.

The most outstanding player was Chris Taggert (Massachusetts), the most outstanding offensive player was Lisa Gmitter (George Mason), and the most outstanding defensive player was Sue Cobb (North Carolina). Additionally, a All-Tournament team, consisting of 16 players, was named for the first time this year.

The leading scorer for the tournament was April Heinrichs from North Carolina (4 goals).

== Qualification ==
At the time, there was only one NCAA championship for women's soccer; a Division III title was added in 1986 and a Division II title in 1988. Hence, all NCAA women's soccer programs (whether from Division I, Division II, or Division III) were eligible for this championship. A total of 12 teams were ultimately invited to contest this tournament.

Team	Appearance	Previous	Record
Boston College	2nd	1982	14-4
Brown	2nd	1982	08-4-1
California	1st	Never	09-1-3
Cincinnati	1st	Never	12-1-3
Connecticut	2nd	1982	18-0-1
Cortland State	2nd	1982	15-2-2
George Mason	2nd	1982	13-3-2
Keene State	1st	Never	12-1-1
Massachusetts	2nd	1982	10-2-3
Missouri–Saint Louis	2nd	1982	?
North Carolina	2nd	1982	16-1
Princeton	2nd	1982	08-3-2

== Bracket ==
First round
Boston College	2
Princeton	0
George Mason	6
UM–Saint Louis	2
Brown	1
Keene State	0
California	5
Cincinnati	0

Second round
Connecticut	2
Boston College	0
Cortland State	1
George Mason	2
Massachusetts	1
Brown	0
North Carolina	5
California	2

Semifinals
Connecticut	1
George Mason	2
Massachusetts	0
North Carolina	2

Championship (Women's College Cup); Orlando, Florida
George Mason	0
North Carolina	4
Third place
Connecticut	0
Massachusetts	1

== See also ==
- NCAA Division I women's soccer championship
- 1983 NCAA Division I men's soccer championship
