= Colorado College Tigers =

Athletic teams of Colorado College

- University: Colorado College
- Nickname: Tigers
- NCAA: Division III / Division I
- Conference: SCAC (primary); NCHC (men's hockey); MWC (women's soccer); WIAC (women's lacrosse); NJAC (men's lacrosse)
- Athletic director: Lesley Irvine
- Location: Colorado Springs, Colorado
- Varsity teams: 16
- Basketball arena: Reid Arena
- Ice hockey arena: Ed Robson Arena
- Colors: Black and gold
- Website: cctigers.com
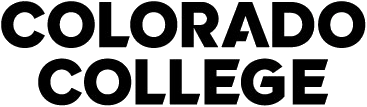

The Colorado College Tigers are composed of 16 teams representing Colorado College in intercollegiate athletics, including men and women's basketball, cross country, lacrosse, soccer, swimming & diving, tennis, and track and field. Men's sports include ice hockey. Women's sports include volleyball. The Tigers compete in NCAA Division III and are members of the Southern Collegiate Athletic Conference for all sports except men's ice hockey and women's soccer, which compete in NCAA Division I, and women's lacrosse and men's lacrosse, which compete in Division III. The men's ice hockey team is a member of the National Collegiate Hockey Conference, while the women's soccer team is a member of the Mountain West Conference. The women's lacrosse team is a member of the Wisconsin Intercollegiate Athletic Conference and will join the New Jersey Athletic Conference for men's lacrosse in 2027.

== Teams ==
=== Current ===
Men's sports	Women's sports
Basketball	Basketball
Cross Country	Cross Country
Ice Hockey	Lacrosse
Lacrosse	Soccer
Soccer	Swimming & Diving
Swimming & Diving	Tennis
Tennis	Track and Field
Track and Field	Volleyball

== History ==
Map of CC

The school's sports teams are nicknamed the "Tigers" Colorado College competes at the NCAA Division III level in all sports except men's hockey, in which it participates in the NCAA Division I National Collegiate Hockey Conference, and women's soccer, where it competes as an NCAA Division I team in the Mountain West Conference. CC dropped its intercollegiate athletic programs in football, softball, and women's water polo following the 2008–09 academic year.

In 1994, a student referendum to change the athletic teams' nicknames to the Cutthroat Trout narrowly failed, by a margin of 468–423.

The Tigers hockey team won the NCAA Division I championship twice (1950, 1957), were runners up three times (1952, 1955, 1996) and have made the NCAA Tournament eighteen times, including eleven times since 1995. In 1996, 1997, and 2005, CC played in the Frozen Four, finishing second in 1996. Fifty-five CC Tigers have been named All-Americans. Hockey Hall of Fame coach Bob Johnson coached the Tigers from 1963 to 1966.

The current hockey coach is Kris Mayotte, who was named the 15th head coach in the school's hockey program history in April 2021.
