= George Mason Patriots =

Collegiate sports club in the United States

- University: George Mason University
- Nickname: Patriots
- NCAA: Division I
- Conference: Atlantic 10 Conference (primary); Eastern Intercollegiate Volleyball Association (men); Mid-American Conference (wrestling)
- Athletic director: Marvin Lewis
- Location: Fairfax, Virginia
- Varsity teams: 22
- Basketball arena: EagleBank Arena
- Baseball stadium: Spuhler Field
- Soccer stadium: George Mason Stadium
- Lacrosse stadium: George Mason Stadium
- Colors: Green and gold
- Mascot: The Patriot
- Fight song: Onward to Victory
- Website: gomason.com/index.aspx
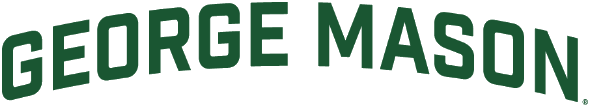

The George Mason Patriots are the intercollegiate athletic teams representing George Mason University (GMU), located in Fairfax, Virginia. The Patriots compete in Division I of the National Collegiate Athletic Association (NCAA) as members of the Atlantic 10 Conference for most sports.

== History ==
The Patriots began to move from NAIA and NCAA Division II status into the NCAA Division I ranks with men's basketball in the 1978–1979 season. According to the History of George Mason basketball, both the men's and women's basketball program have been fixtures of campus life. Within a few years, all other sports also were elevated to Division I status. George Mason reached its current level of 20 varsity sports with the addition of women's lacrosse (1993–1994), women's rowing (1997–1998) and men's and women's swimming & diving (1999–2000). In addition, George Mason has fielded a varsity club football team since 1993 that competes intercollegiately. Their opponents range from other club teams to NCAA Division I FCS programs. GMU was a founding member of the CAA but joined the Atlantic 10 in 2013.

== Sports sponsored ==
Atlantic 10 Conference textless logo in George Mason green

Men's sports	Women's sports
Baseball	Basketball
Basketball	Cross country
Cross country	Lacrosse
Golf	Rowing
Soccer	Soccer
Swimming and diving	Softball
Tennis	Swimming and diving
Track and field^{†}	Tennis
Volleyball	Track and field^{†}
Wrestling	Volleyball
† – Track and field includes both indoor and outdoor

=== Men's basketball ===
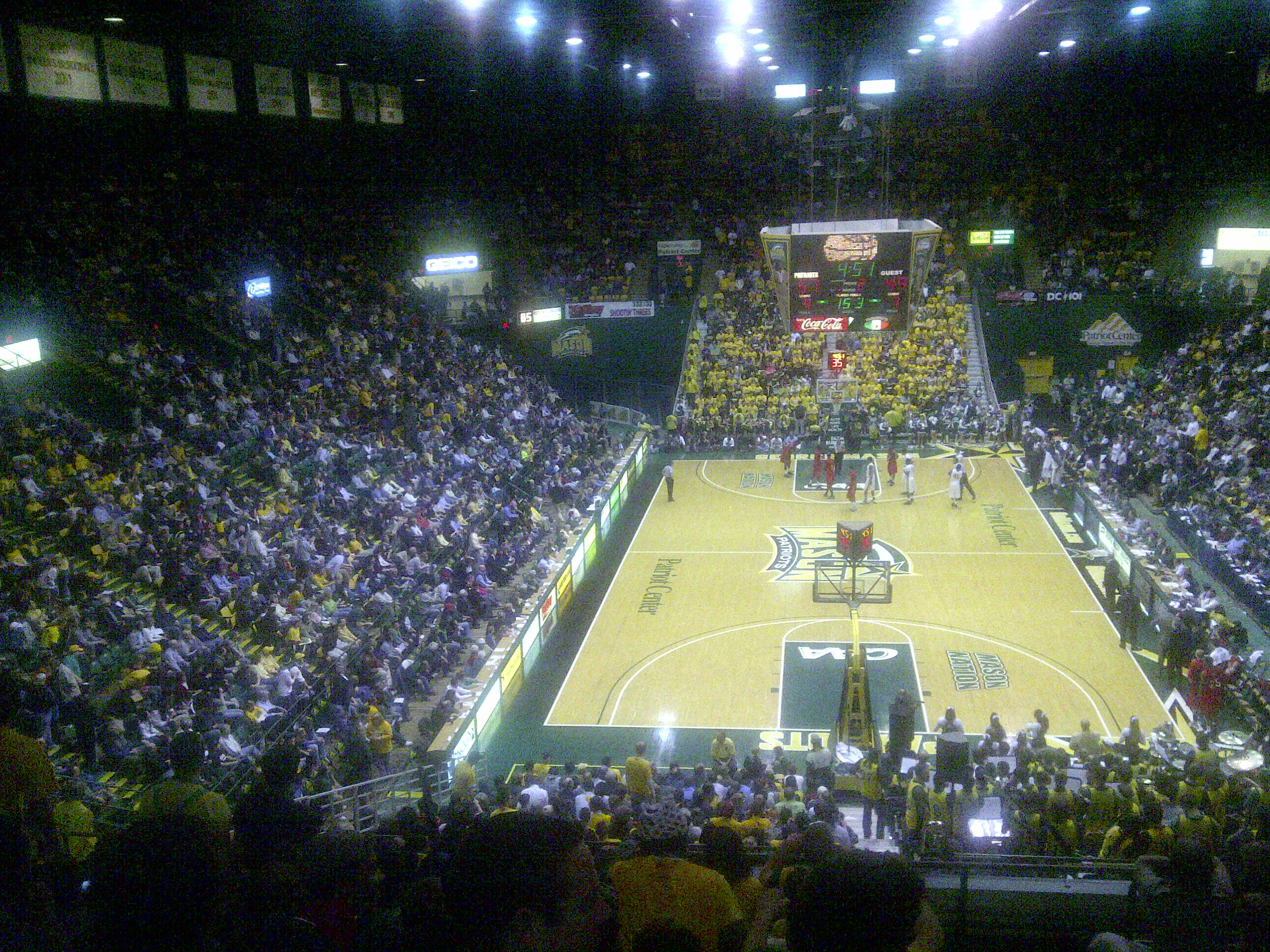
GMU stadium during a game in 2011

While many of the schoolʼs athletic programs have had historical seasons, the men's basketball program remains the flagship sport at the university. The menʼs basketball team has played at the Patriot Center since 1985 after playing prior seasons in the PE Building on the west side of the Fairfax Campus. The menʼs basketball team has made the NCAA tournament six times (1989, 1999, 2001, 2006, 2008, and 2011) and the NIT tournament five times (1986, 2002, 2004, 2009 and 2025). The Patriot basketball team is most famous for its 2006 NCAA run to the Final Four. GMU beat perennial powers UNC, Connecticut, and Michigan State, as well as a highly ranked Wichita State team, before losing to eventual National Champion Florida in the Final Four.

The programʼs largest rivals include conference foes George Washington and Virginia Commonwealth. New rivalries are forming via George Masonʼs admission to the A-10.

The best-known player in Patriots history is George Evans, a Gulf War veteran who played from 1997 to 2001 and was a CAA player of year three consecutive seasons. He shares the CAA record with NBA legend David Robinson for winning the award three straight times. Other Patriot standouts include Andre Gaddy, Carlos Yates, Kenny Sanders, Curtis McCants, Nate Langley, Robert Dykes, Robert Rose, Jason Miskiri, Jai Lewis, Lamar Butler, Tony Skinn, Gabe Norwood, Folarin Campbell, and Will Thomas.

=== Men's soccer ===
Men's soccer was one of the first varsity sports to be offered when the then George Mason College began its athletic program in the late 1960s. Since then, it has become one of the most successful programs among the 22 NCAA Division I sports currently offered. In the 39-year history of George Mason soccer, the program has a record of 377-264-76 for a winning percentage of .579. The Patriots have posted at least 10 victories in 23 of those seasons, including 14 in a row from 1980 to 1993, and they have finished a season nationally ranked nine times (1981, '82, '84, '85, '87, '88, '90, '92 and '96) in the last 24 years. At George Mason Stadium, the team's 5,000-seat home field which opened for the 1982 season, the Patriots have a record of 140-61-26 (.674 winning percentage). The men's team has reached the NCAA Men's Division I Soccer Championship eight times (1985, '86, '87, '89, '90, '96, 2006 and 2008). Notable former players include Joe Addo, Denis Hamlett, Ritchie Kotschau, Bob Lilley, Tamir Linhart, Anthony Noreiga, John O'Hara, Mark Pulisic, Conor Shanosky, John Borrajo, Irad Young, Taylor Washington, and Brent Brockman.

George Mason won the A-10 conference championship their first year in the league (2013).

=== Women's soccer ===
Women's soccer has been perhaps the most successful program at George Mason University. The Patriots have reached the NCAA Division 1 Women's Soccer Championship twelve times and the College Cup four times (1983, '85, '86, '93), in 1983 they reached the final but would lose 4–0 to North Carolina. Under Coach Hank Leung, the Patriots would again reach the final in the 1985 tournament, on Nov. 24, in front of a record-crowd of 4,500 people at George Mason Stadium and millions on national television on an ESPN broadcast, No. 3 George Mason would beat No. 2 North Carolina 2–0 to win the school's first ever National Championship in their history. GMU players Pam Baughman and Betsy Drambour won the Most Outstanding Player and Most Outstanding Defensive Player awards respectively while another GMU player, Lisa Gmitter, being the tournament's top scorer with 3 goals.

=== Swimming and diving ===
The George Mason Patriots swimming and diving program represents George Mason in the aquatics sports of swimming and diving. The program includes separate men's and women's teams, both of which compete in the Atlantic 10 Conference (A-10).

The George Mason swim & dive men's team has won the Atlantic 10 championship once, winning the title in 2020.

The George Mason swim & dive women's team has never won an Atlantic 10 championship. The women's team won the Coastal Athletic Association championship in 1998, 1999, 2000, and 2001.

==== Men's school record holders ====
Records as of Sept. 1, 2023:

- 50 Free - Eric Knight
- 100 Free - Eric Knight
- 200 Free - Eric Knight
- 500 Free - Tom Koucheravy
- 1000 Free - Tom Koucheravy
- 1650 Free - Tom Koucheravy
- 100 Back - Logan Eubanks
- 200 Back - Ryan Donnelly
- 100 Breast - Dylan Peck
- 200 Breast - Tyler Lentine
- 100 Fly - Alexander Franklin
- 200 Fly - Luke DeVore
- 200 IM - Dylan Peck
- 400 IM - Preston Wolter
- 200 Free Relay - 2023 George Mason
- 400 Free Relay - 2023 George Mason
- 800 Free Relay - 2014 George Mason
- 200 Medley Relay - 2020 George Mason
- 400 Medley Relay - 2023 George Mason
- 1-Meter Dive - Derrick Butts
- 3-Meter Dive - Derrick Butts

==== Women's school record holders ====
Records as of Sept. 1, 2023:

- 50 Free - Ali Tyler
- 100 Free - Ali Tyler
- 200 Free - Ali Tyler
- 500 Free - Caitlin Impink
- 1000 Free - Megan Cummins
- 1650 Free - Megan Cummins
- 100 Back - Ali Tyler
- 200 Back - Ali Tyler
- 100 Breast - Ashley Danner
- 200 Breast - Ashley Danner
- 100 Fly - Sydney Fisher
- 200 Fly - Lauren Stinnett
- 200 IM - Ashley Danner
- 400 IM - Ali Tyler
- 200 Free Relay - 2023 George Mason
- 400 Free Relay - 2023 George Mason
- 800 Free Relay - 2022 George Mason
- 200 Medley Relay - 2023 George Mason
- 400 Medley Relay - 2023 George Mason
- 1-Meter Dive - Kristen Meier
- 3-Meter Dive - Kristen Meier

=== Track and field ===
==== Notable athletes ====
- Julius Achon, middle-distance runner
- Abdi Bile, middle-distance runner
- Terri Dendy, sprinter
- Rob Muzzio, decathlon
- Richard Phillips, sprinter
- David Verburg, sprinter
- Gabe Norwood, Professional Basketball Player, Rain or Shine Elasto Painters(Philippine Basketball Association)
- Jason Hartman, Steeple Chase
- Angela Brown, Long Jump

== Club sports ==
In addition to its NCAA Division I sports, George Mason fields club teams in the following sports:

- Bowling
- Crew
- Baseball (club)
- Equestrian
- Fencing
- Field hockey
- Football (Varsity Club)
- Ice hockey
- Lacrosse (club)
- Rugby
- Soccer (club)
- Swimming (club)
- Synchronized swimming
- Tennis
- Trap and skeet
- Ultimate
- Underwater hockey
- Men's volleyball
- Inline hockey

== Championships and titles ==
=== National championships ===
The Patriots have won 2 NCAA team championships, 23 George Mason student-athletes have claimed 35 individual national championships, and 13 George Mason teams have made more than 117 NCAA postseason appearances since the school opened.

Men's

- Indoor Track and Field (1): 1996

Women's

- Soccer (1): 1985

=== NCAA tournament appearances ===
Men's

- Basketball (6), 1989, 1999, 2001, 2006, 2008, 2011
- Volleyball (4), 1984, 1985, 1988, 2016
- Soccer (11), 1982, 1984, 1985, 1986, 1987, 1989, 1990, 1996, 2006, 2008, 2013
- Baseball (8), 1985, 1988, 1992, 1993, 2004, 2009, 2014, 2023

Women's

- Basketball (1), 2025
- Indoor Track and Field (1), 2025
- Soccer
- Volleyball (7), 1993, 1994, 1995, 1996, 2002, 2003, 2009

=== Colonial Athletic Association titles ===
Mason athletes have captured 280 individual CAA championships, with 47 team CAA titles.

Men's

- Baseball (2), 1988, 1991–92,
- Basketball (4) Regular Season Championships and (4) Conference Tournament Championships
- Soccer (5), 1984–85*, 1985–86*, 1986–87, 1989–90, 2008–09

[*These titles are shared with American University]

- Track & field (6)
- Wrestling (5), 1991–92, 1994–95, 1995–96, 1996–97, 2000–01

Women's

- Cross Country (4)
- Soccer (1)
- Swimming & Diving (4)
- Track & Field (9) (all consecutive from 1990 to 1998)
- Volleyball (8), 1992, 1993, 1994, 1995, 1996, 2002, 2003, 2009

=== Atlantic 10 titles ===
Mason has captured 22 team A-10 championships.

Men's

- Soccer (2) 2013, 2024*
- Baseball (2) 2014, 2023
- Basketball (1) 2025*
- Cross Country (1) 2014
- Indoor Track & Field (2) 2017, 2019
- Outdoor Track & Field (4) 2015, 2016, 2019, 2025
- Swimming and Diving (1) 2020

[*Regular Season Title]

Women's

- Basketball (2) 2025, 2026*
- Indoor Track & Field (2) 2014, 2025
- Outdoor Track & Field (4) 2014, 2015, 2017, 2019
- Softball (1) 2023

[*Regular Season Title]
