= 2011 Texas A&M Aggies women's soccer team =

American college soccer season

2011 Texas A&M Aggies women's soccer

Big 12 Champions

NCAA tournament, 2nd Round
- Conference: Big 12 Conference
- U. Soc. Coaches poll: No. 21
- Record: 16-6-2 (6–1–1 Big-12)
- Head coach: G. Guerrieri (19th season)
- Home stadium: Aggie Soccer Stadium

Uniform
| Home | Away |

2011 Big 12 Conference women's soccer standings
| | Conf. | | | | | | Overall |
| Team | W | | L | | T | PCT | W | | L | | T | PCT |
|---|---|---|---|---|---|---|---|---|---|---|---|---|
| No. 5 Oklahoma State ‍†‍‍^{y} | 6 | – | 0 | – | 2 | .875 | 17 | – | 0 | – | 2 | .947 |
| No. 21 Texas A&M ‍‍‡‍^{y} | 6 | – | 1 | – | 1 | .813 | 13 | – | 5 | – | 1 | .711 |
| Baylor ‍‍‍^{y} | 5 | – | 2 | – | 1 | .688 | 14 | – | 3 | – | 2 | .789 |
| Texas Tech ‍‍‍ | 3 | – | 4 | – | 1 | .438 | 10 | – | 7 | – | 2 | .579 |
| Texas ‍‍‍^{y} | 3 | – | 4 | – | 1 | .438 | 10 | – | 7 | – | 1 | .583 |
| Missouri ‍‍‍ | 3 | – | 5 | – | 0 | .375 | 12 | – | 7 | – | 0 | .632 |
| Kansas ‍‍‍^{y} | 3 | – | 5 | – | 0 | .375 | 11 | – | 8 | – | 0 | .579 |
| Oklahoma ‍‍‍ | 2 | – | 6 | – | 0 | .250 | 7 | – | 12 | – | 0 | .368 |
| Iowa State ‍‍‍ | 2 | – | 6 | – | 0 | .250 | 9 | – | 9 | – | 1 | .500 |
† – Conference champion ‡ – Tournament champion y – Invited to the NCAA tournament Rankings from NSCAA Coaches

The 2011 Texas A&M Aggies women's soccer team represented Texas A&M University in the 2011 NCAA Division I women's college soccer season. The team belonged to the Big 12 Conference and played its home games at Ellis Field. The Aggies were led by G. Guerrieri, who has coached the team since the program's inception in 1993 (19 years).

The 2011 team had 25 roster players, with 14 scholarships to utilize between them.

== 2011 schedule ==
| Date | Opponent | Location | Result | Record | Att | Rank |
|---|---|---|---|---|---|---|
| Aug 19, 2011 | Fresno St. | Ellis Field | W, 4-2 | 1-0-0 | 1,679 | 11 |
| Aug 21, 2011 | (17) UC Irvine | Ellis Field | L, 0-1 | 1-1-0 | 1,574 | 11 |
| Aug 26, 2011 | vs. (8) Florida | Knoxville, TN | L, 2-3 | 1-2-0 | n/a | 18 |
| Aug 28, 2011 | at Tennessee | Knoxville, TN | L, 0-1 | 1-3-0 | 747 | 18 |
| Sept 2, 2011 | Dartmouth | Ellis Field | W, 3-0 | 2-3-0 | 4,887 | - |
| Sept 5, 2011 | McNeese St. | Ellis Field | W, 9-0 | 3-3-0 | 2,043 | - |
| Sept 9, 2011 | at (6) Duke | Durham, NC | L, 2-7 | 3-4-0 | 1,600 | - |
| Sept 11, 2011 | vs. (1) North Carolina | Durham, NC | W, 4-3 OT | 4-4-0 | 1,013 | - |
| Sept 16, 2011 | Baylor | Ellis Field | W, 2-1 | 5-4-0 | 3,251 | - |
| Sept 18, 2011 | Fordham | Ellis Field | W, 13-1 | 6-4-0 | 1,858 | - |
| Sept 23, 2011 | Iowa State | Ellis Field | W, 3-1 | 7-4-0 | 2,779 | - |
| Sept 25, 2011 | Loyola-Chicago | Ellis Field | W, 5-0 | 8-4-0 | 1,573 | - |
| Sept 30, 2011 | at Missouri | Columbia, MO | L, 0-1 | 8-5-0 | 1,224 | - |
| Oct 2, 2011 | at Kansas | Lawrence, KS | W, 3-0 | 9-5-0 | 581 | - |
| Oct 7, 2011 | at Texas Tech | Lubbock, TX | W, 2-0 | 10-5-0 | 2,176 | - |
| Oct 14, 2011 | Drake | Ellis Field | W, 6-1 | 11-5-0 | 4,316 | - |
| Oct 21, 2011 | Oklahoma | Ellis Field | W, 3-0 | 12-5-0 | 2,810 | - |
| Oct 23, 2011 | (2) Oklahoma St. | Ellis Field | T, 0-0 2OT | 12-5-1 | 2,405 | - |
| Oct 28, 2011 | at Texas | Austin, TX | W, 3-0 | 13-5-1 | 4,222 | 22 |
Big 12 tournament
| Nov 2, 2011 | vs. Kansas | San Antonio, TX | T, 3-3 2OT (5–4 PK) | 13-5-2 | 658 | 21 |
| Nov 4, 2011 | vs. Missouri | San Antonio, TX | W, 3-0 | 14-5-2 | 789 | 21 |
| Nov 6, 2011 | vs. (3) Oklahoma St. | San Antonio, TX | W, 1-0 | 15-5-2 | 1,611 | 21 |
NCAA tournament
| Nov 11, 2011 | vs. LSU | Ellis Field | W, 4-0 | 16-5-2 | 2,384 | 12 |
| Nov 18, 2011 | vs. Virginia Tech | Charlottesville, VA | L, 1-3 | 16-6-2 | 240 | 12 |

== Lineup/Formation ==
- 4–3–3 shown
- Mouseover names for stats

== Roster/statistics ==
- Starters highlighted in green

| No | Pos | Player | Cl | Hometown | Club | GP | GS | G | A | Pts | Sh | Sog |
|---|---|---|---|---|---|---|---|---|---|---|---|---|
| 15 | F | Kelley Monogue | Fr. | McKinney, TX (McKinney Boyd) | Dallas Texans | 24 | 19 | 19 | 9 | 47 | 82 | 38 |
| 9 | F | Merritt Mathias | Sr. | Birmingham, AL (Oak Mountain/North Carolina) | Birmingham United | 24 | 24 | 8 | 11 | 27 | 93 | 37 |
| 12 | F | Nora Skelton | Jr. | Austin, TX (James Bowie) | Lonestar SC | 23 | 14 | 6 | 9 | 21 | 26 | 14 |
| 7 | F | Annie Kunz | Fr. | Golden, CO (Wheat Ridge) | Colorado Rush | 24 | 5 | 14 | 7 | 35 | 57 | 29 |
| 1 | F | Allie Bailey | Fr. | San Diego, CA (Torrey Pines) | San Diego Surf | 24 | 6 | 6 | 5 | 17 | 36 | 17 |
| 3 | F | Shea Groom | Fr. | Liberty, MO (Liberty) | KCFC | 10 | 7 | 6 | 4 | 16 | 13 | 9 |
| 22 | F | Bianca Brinson | Fr. | Austin, TX (Hyde Park) | Lonestar SC | 23 | 1 | 2 | 3 | 7 | 26 | 11 |
| 27 | F | Catalina Clavijo | Jr. | Winnipeg, Canada (Shaftesbury) | Manitoba Provincial | 5 | 0 | 0 | 1 | 1 | 1 | 1 |
| 10 | M | Beth West | Jr. | Centennial, CO (Grandview) | Real Colorado | 22 | 14 | 0 | 14 | 14 | 17 | 5 |
| 26 | M | Megan Majewski | Sr. | Cypress, TX (Cy-Fair) | Challenge SC | 22 | 7 | 3 | 4 | 10 | 20 | 7 |
| 3 | M | Katie Hamilton | Jr. | Spring, TX (Klein) | Challenge SC | 21 | 10 | 1 | 1 | 3 | 13 | 5 |
| 19 | M | Chelsea Jones | Jr. | Belton, TX (Belton) | Lonestar SC | 22 | 11 | 3 | 3 | 9 | 20 | 7 |
| 8 | M | Katie Perry | Fr. | Mission Viejo, CA (Capistrano Valley) | San Diego Surf | 21 | 7 | 0 | 8 | 8 | 15 | 5 |
| 11 | M | Bri Young | Sr. | Castle Pines North, CO (Chaparral) | Real Colorado | 15 | 5 | 2 | 1 | 5 | 24 | 9 |
| 13 | M | Leigh Edwards | Fr. | Coto de Caza, CA (Santa Margarita Catholic) | So Cal Blues | 22 | 4 | 1 | 3 | 5 | 7 | 3 |
| 21 | M | Mary Grace Schmidt | Jr. | Orange, CA (Mater Dei) | Slammers FC | 16 | 9 | 0 | 0 | 0 | 11 | 0 |
| 33 | M | Jayne Eadie (I-RS) | Jr. | Lancashire, England (St. Bedes/Oregon St.) | Manchester City FC | 0 | 0 | 0 | 0 | 0 | 0 | 0 |
| 4 | D | Meghan Streight | Fr. | McKinney, TX (McKinney Boyd) | D'Feeters SC | 24 | 24 | 4 | 1 | 9 | 34 | 18 |
| 24 | D | Rachel Balaguer | Sr. | Austin, TX (St. Stephen's) | Lonestar SC | 24 | 24 | 0 | 5 | 5 | 7 | 3 |
| 5 | D | Lyndsey Gnatzig | Jr. | Humble, TX (Atascocita) | Challenge SC | 24 | 24 | 0 | 5 | 5 | 2 | 1 |
| 2 | D | Rachel Lenz | So. | Round Rock, TX (Round Rock) | Lonestar SC | 24 | 24 | 0 | 1 | 1 | 5 | 1 |
| 18 | D | Kat Bartley | So. | College Station, TX (A&M Consolidated) | Challenge SC | 8 | 1 | 0 | 0 | 0 | 2 | 1 |
| 0 | GK | Jordan Day | Fr. | Gilbert, AZ (Basha) | Sereno SC | 21 | 19 | 0 | 0 | 0 | 0 | 0 |
| 23 | GK | Renée McDermott | Fr. | San Clemente, CA (San Clemente) | Slammers FC | 6 | 5 | 0 | 0 | 0 | 0 | 0 |

== Season review ==
=== Non-Conference ===
Texas A&M opened its season with a pair of games against 2010 NCAA tournament teams Fresno State and UC Irvine. Despite the debut of 10 freshmen, which was considered one of the nation's best recruiting classes, the Aggies outshot and outscored the Bulldogs 4–2. All four goals were scored by freshmen, two by Allie Bailey and one each by Shea Groom and Leigh Edwards. Against #17 UC Irvine, despite outshooting the Anteaters 21–5 and holding possession for almost the entire match, A&M fell 1–0 in a disappointing loss. The Aggies missed scoring opportunities on 3 separate 1v1 against the UC Irvine GK, and also hit the crossbar on a header by freshman Meghan Streight off a corner kick in the 2nd half. Both games were notable in that the weather conditions were very hot, with temperatures hovering over 100 degrees during the matches.
The Aggies first foray on the road was not a good one. Playing in a tournament in Knoxville, A&M lost matches to Florida, 2–3, and Tennessee, 0–1, despite garnering the majority of possession and shots on goal in both matches. Against the Gators, after an even first half in which Annie Kunz and Kelley Monogue scored to tie the match at 2-2, the second half belonged to the Aggies, outshooting Florida 13-5 (21-12 overall). The Gators cleared four shots by A&M off their own goal line and thwarted several other good scoring chances. However, in the final minutes Florida regained momentum and scored the winning goal with 15 seconds left in regulation. Against Tennessee, A&M again gained the majority of possession and outshot the Vols 16–8, but couldn't find a goal against the stingy Tennessee defense. The Aggies hit the post four times in the match, including twice by Kelley Monogue in a frantic 33rd minute in which the Vol defense was under intense pressure. A&M also missed a couple of 1v1 with the Vol GK, the closest being Bianca Brinson's missed shot just wide of the goal in the 36th minute. Tennessee was awarded a PK in the 35th minute after A&M GK Jordan Day became entangled with a Vol forward, resulting in the 1–0 win for Tennessee. It was only the 3rd time in A&M history that the Aggies had lost 3 consecutive games, and it was the first time an Aggies squad had started the season 1–3.
