= 2013 Texas A&M Aggies women's soccer team =

American college soccer season

2013 Texas A&M Aggies women's soccer

SEC Champions

NCAA Tournament, Sweet 16
- Conference: Southeastern Conference
- U. Soc. Coaches poll: No. 8
- Record: 18-5-2 (9–2–0 Big-12)
- Head coach: G. Guerrieri (21st season)
- Home stadium: Aggie Soccer Stadium

Uniform
Home	Away

The 2013 Texas A&M Aggies women's soccer team represented Texas A&M University in the 2012 NCAA Division I women's college soccer season. The team belonged to the Southeastern Conference (SEC) and played its home games at Ellis Field. The Aggies were led by G. Guerrieri, who had coached the team since the program's inception in 1993 (21 years).

The 2013 team had 22 roster players, with 14 scholarships to utilize between them.

2013 SEC soccer standings
	Conf.					Overall
Team	W		L		T	W		L		T
#8 Texas A&M $	9	–	2	–	0	18	–	5	–	2
#10 Florida	9	–	2	–	0	18	–	5	–	1
#15 South Carolina	8	–	2	–	1	17	–	4	–	2
Ole Miss	7	–	3	–	1	16	–	6	–	2
Kentucky	7	–	4	–	0	14	–	7	–	1
Georgia	5	–	5	–	1	12	–	7	–	1
LSU	5	–	5	–	1	9	–	9	–	2
Arkansas	5	–	6	–	0	15	–	8	–	1
Missouri	4	–	4	–	3	8	–	9	–	3
Auburn	3	–	5	–	3	8	–	9	–	4
Alabama	4	–	7	–	0	6	–	12	–	0
Tennessee	3	–	5	–	3	8	–	7	–	4
Vanderbilt	1	–	9	–	1	4	–	12	–	3
Mississippi St.	0	–	11	–	0	3	–	15	–	0
† Tournament Champion NCAA Tournament participants highlighted; Rankings from NSCAA Final Poll

== 2013 schedule ==
Date	Opponent	Location	Result	Record	Att	Rank
Aug 23, 2013	Duke	Ellis Field	L, 0-1	0-1-0	5,242	12
Aug 25, 2013	UTSA	Ellis Field	W, 1-0	1-1-0	1,869	12
Aug 30, 2013	Arizona St.	Ellis Field	W, 2-1	2-1-0	1,972	19
Sept 1, 2013	Pepperdine	Ellis Field	L, 1-3	2-2-0	1,683	19
Sept 6, 2013	San Diego	Ellis Field	W, 6-1	3-2-0	1,818	24
Sept 8, 2013	Baylor	Ellis Field	T, 0-0 2OT	3-2-1	2,052	24
Sept 13, 2013	UMass	Ellis Field	W, 3-1	4-2-1	1,678	20
Sept 15, 2013	Cal Poly	Ellis Field	W, 4-0	5-2-1	1,637	20
Sept 20, 2013	at Tennessee	Knoxville, TN	L, 0-1	5-3-1	1,256	20
Sept 27, 2013	Mississippi St.	Ellis Field	W, 8-0	6-3-1	1,860	-
Sept 29, 2013	Vanderbilt	Ellis Field	W, 3-0	7-3-1	1,830	-
Oct 4, 2013	at Auburn	Auburn, AL	W, 3-1	8-3-1	647	-
Oct 6, 2013	at Missouri	Columbia, MO	W, 2-1	9-3-1	1,734	-
Oct 11, 2013	Arkansas	Ellis Field	W, 4-3 OT	10-3-1	4,593	-
Oct 18, 2013	at Alabama	Tuscaloosa, AL	W, 3-0	11-3-1	1,280	-
Oct 20, 2013	at Georgia	Athens, GA	W, 2-1	12-3-1	1,694	-
Oct 25, 2013	Ole Miss	Ellis Field	W, 2-1	13-3-1	2,335	-
Oct 27, 2013	at Florida	Gainesville, FL	L, 0-2	13-4-1	1,441	-
Oct 31, 2013	LSU	Ellis Field	W, 3-2	14-4-1	1,968	24
SEC Tournament
Nov 6, 2013	vs. Auburn	Orange Beach, AL	W, 1-0	15-4-1	-	21
Nov 8, 2013	vs. South Carolina	Orange Beach, AL	W, 2-1	16-4-1	-	21
Nov 10, 2013	vs. Florida	Orange Beach, AL	W, 2-1	17-4-1	1,711	21
NCAA Tournament
Nov 15, 2013	vs. Utah Utes	Ellis Field	W, 1-0	18-4-1	1,400	13
Nov 22, 2013	vs. Texas Tech	Chapel Hill, NC	T, 2-2 2OT (4–2 PK)	18-4-2	2,019	13
Nov 24, 2013	vs. North Carolina	Chapel Hill, NC	L, 0-2	18-5-2	806	13

== Lineup/formation ==
- 4–3–3 shown
- Mouseover names for stats

== Roster/statistics ==
- Starters highlighted in green

No	Pos	Player	Cl	Hometown	Club	GP	GS	G	A	Pts	Sh	Sog
3	F	Shea Groom	Jr.	Liberty, MO (Liberty)	KCFC	0	0	0	0	0	0	0
7	F	Annie Kunz	Jr.	Golden, CO (Wheat Ridge)	Colorado Rush	0	0	0	0	0	0	0
1	F	Allie Bailey	Jr.	San Diego, CA (Torrey Pines)	San Diego Surf	0	0	0	0	0	0	0
15	F	Kelley Monogue	Jr.	McKinney, TX (McKinney Boyd)	Dallas Texans	0	0	0	0	0	0	0
22	F	Bianca Brinson	Jr.	Austin, TX (Hyde Park)	Lonestar SC	0	0	0	0	0	0	0
27	F	Elizabeth Keester	Fr.	Tulsa, OK (Jenks)	TSC Hurricane	0	0	0	0	0	0	0
33	F	Kristi Leonard	Fr.	League City, TX (Clear Creek)	Space City FC	0	0	0	0	0	0	0
10	M	J. Cousineau	So.	San Clemente, CA (San Clemente)	So Cal Blues	0	0	0	0	0	0	0
33	M	A. Cruz	Fr.	San Diego, CA (La Jolla Country Day)	So Cal Blues	0	0	0	0	0	0	0
13	M	Leigh Edwards	So.	Coto de Caza, CA (Santa Margarita Catholic)	So Cal Blues	0	0	0	0	0	0	0
11	M	Sarah Shaw	Fr.	Keller, TX (Keller)	Sting Dallas	0	0	0	0	0	0	0
8	M	Ashlynn Harryman	Fr.	Dana Point, CA (Dana Hills)	Slanmmers FC	0	0	0	0	0	0	0
19	M	Christina S.-Quintanar	Sr.	Campo de Criptana, Spain	Maryland	0	0	0	0	0	0	0
4	D	Meghan Streight	Jr.	McKinney, TX (McKinney Boyd)	D'Feeters SC	0	0	0	0	0	0	0
13	D	Leigh Edwards	So.	Coto de Caza, CA (Santa Margarita Catholic)	So Cal Blues	0	0	0	0	0	0	0
2	D	Rachel Lenz	Sr.	Round Rock, TX (Round Rock)	Lonestar SC	0	0	0	0	0	0	0
24	D	Karlie Mueller	So.	Sioux Falls, SD (Roosevelt)	Toro SC	0	0	0	0	0	0	0
14	D	Jackie Tondl	So.	Omaha, NE (Marian)	Toro SC	0	0	0	0	0	0	0
19	D	Grace Wright	Fr.	College Station, TX (A&M Consolidated)	Challenge SC	0	0	0	0	0	0	0
0	GK	Jordan Day	Jr.	Gilbert, AZ (Basha)	Sereno SC	0	0	0	0	0	0	0
23	GK	Taylor Saucier	Fr.	Omaha, NE (Marian)	Toro FC	0	0	0	0	0	0	0
23	GK	Renée McDermott	So.	San Clemente, CA (San Clemente)	Slammers FC	0	0	0	0	0	0	0
