= 2014 Texas A&M Aggies women's soccer team =

American college soccer season

2014 Texas A&M Aggies women's soccer

SEC Champions

NCAA Tournament, College Cup
- Conference: Southeastern Conference
- U. Soc. Coaches poll: No. 4
- Record: 22-3-2 (9–1–1 Big-12)
- Head coach: G. Guerrieri (22nd season)
- Home stadium: Aggie Soccer Stadium

Uniform
Home	Away

The 2014 Texas A&M Aggies women's soccer team represented Texas A&M University in the 2014 NCAA Division I women's college soccer season. The team belonged to the Southeastern Conference (SEC) and plays its home games at Ellis Field. The Aggies were led by G. Guerrieri, who has coached the team since the program's inception in 1993 (22 years). The 2014 team was the first squad in school history to reach the College Cup, eventually losing to the Virginia Cavaliers 3-1 in the national semifinals.

The 2014 team has 22 roster players, with 14 scholarships to utilize between them.

== 2014 schedule ==
Date	Opponent	Location	Result	Record	Att	Rank
Aug 22, 2014	Dayton	Ellis Field	W, 4-3	1-0-0	2,876	9
Aug 24, 2014	SFA	Ellis Field	W, 1-0	2-0-0	2,696	9
Aug 29, 2014	(18) Central Florida	Ellis Field	W, 3-0	3-0-0	5,634	7
Aug 31, 2014	Illinois St.	Ellis Field	W, 4-1	4-0-0	2,147	7
Sept 5, 2014	Arizona	Tempe, AZ	T, 2-2 2OT	4-0-1	854	6
Sept 7, 2014	Arizona St.	Tempe, AZ	L, 1-2	4-1-1	656	6
Sept 11, 2014	Florida Gulf Coast	Ellis Field	W, 2-1	5-1-1	2,461	12
Sept 14, 2014	Marquette	Ellis Field	W, 3-0	6-1-1	2,887	12
Sept 18, 2014	at Tennessee	Ellis Field	W, 3-0	7-1-1	2,438	11
Sept 26, 2014	LSU	Baton Rouge, LA	W, 4-0	8-1-1	1,013	10
Sept 28, 2014	Ole Miss	Oxford, MS	W, 2-1	9-1-1	912	10
Oct 3, 2014	at (6) Florida	Ellis Field	L, 0-1	9-2-1	2,955	9
Oct 5, 2014	at Kentucky	Ellis Field	W, 2-1	10-2-1	2,417	9
Oct 10, 2014	at Vanderbilt	Nashville, TN	W, 6-2	11-2-1	534	10
Oct 17, 2014	Auburn	Ellis Field	W, 3-1	12-2-1	3,021	8
Oct 19, 2014	at Mississippi St.	Starkville, MS	W, 3-0	13-2-1	526	8
Oct 24, 2014	at Arkansas	Fayetteville, AR	W, 2-1	14-2-1	1,307	6
Oct 26, 2014	(21) South Carolina	Ellis Field	T, 2-2 2OT	14-2-2	2,758	6
Oct 30, 2014	Georgia	Ellis Field	W, 2-1	15-2-2	2,701	7
SEC Tournament
Nov 5, 2014	vs. Georgia	Orange Beach, AL	W, 3-0	16-2-2	876	7
Nov 7, 2014	vs. (17) South Carolina	Orange Beach, AL	W, 1-0	17-2-2	656	7
Nov 9, 2014	vs. (20) Kentucky	Orange Beach, AL	W, 1-0	18-2-2	1,512	7
NCAA Tournament
Nov 14, 2014	vs. Houston Baptist	Ellis Field	W, 5-0	19-2-2	1,527	5
Nov 21, 2014	vs. Arizona	Ellis Field	W, 7-2	20-2-2	2,212	5
Nov 23, 2014	vs. (12) Notre Dame	Ellis Field	W, 2-1	21-2-2	2,250	5
Nov 29, 2014	vs. (8) Penn State	Ellis Field	W, 2-1	22-2-2	3,161	5
Dec 5, 2014	vs. (4) Virginia	Fort Lauderdale, FL	L, 1-3	22-3-2	3,141	5

== Lineup/formation ==
- 4–3–3 shown
- Mouseover names for stats

== Roster/statistics ==
- Starters highlighted in green

No	Pos	Player	Cl	Hometown	Club	GP	GS	G	A	Pts	Sh	Sog
3	F	Shea Groom	Jr.	Liberty, MO (Liberty)	KCFC	0	0	0	0	0	0	0
7	F	Annie Kunz	Jr.	Golden, CO (Wheat Ridge)	Colorado Rush	0	0	0	0	0	0	0
1	F	Allie Bailey	Jr.	San Diego, CA (Torrey Pines)	San Diego Surf	0	0	0	0	0	0	0
15	F	Kelley Monogue	Jr.	McKinney, TX (McKinney Boyd)	Dallas Texans	0	0	0	0	0	0	0
22	F	Bianca Brinson	Jr.	Austin, TX (Hyde Park)	Lonestar SC	0	0	0	0	0	0	0
27	F	Elizabeth Keester	Fr.	Tulsa, OK (Jenks)	TSC Hurricane	0	0	0	0	0	0	0
33	F	Kristi Leonard	Fr.	League City, TX (Clear Creek)	Space City FC	0	0	0	0	0	0	0
10	M	J. Cousineau	So.	San Clemente, CA (San Clemente)	So Cal Blues	0	0	0	0	0	0	0
33	M	A. Cruz	Fr.	San Diego, CA (La Jolla Country Day)	So Cal Blues	0	0	0	0	0	0	0
13	M	Leigh Edwards	So.	Coto de Caza, CA (Santa Margarita Catholic)	So Cal Blues	0	0	0	0	0	0	0
11	M	Sarah Shaw	Fr.	Keller, TX (Keller)	Sting Dallas	0	0	0	0	0	0	0
8	M	Ashlynn Harryman	Fr.	Dana Point, CA (Dana Hills)	Slanmmers FC	0	0	0	0	0	0	0
19	M	Christina S.-Quintanar	Sr.	Campo de Criptana, Spain	Maryland	0	0	0	0	0	0	0
4	D	Meghan Streight	Jr.	McKinney, TX (McKinney Boyd)	D'Feeters SC	0	0	0	0	0	0	0
13	D	Leigh Edwards	So.	Coto de Caza, CA (Santa Margarita Catholic)	So Cal Blues	0	0	0	0	0	0	0
2	D	Rachel Lenz	Sr.	Round Rock, TX (Round Rock)	Lonestar SC	0	0	0	0	0	0	0
24	D	Karlie Mueller	So.	Sioux Falls, SD (Roosevelt)	Toro SC	0	0	0	0	0	0	0
14	D	Jackie Tondl	So.	Omaha, NE (Marian)	Toro SC	0	0	0	0	0	0	0
19	D	Grace Wright	Fr.	College Station, TX (A&M Consolidated)	Challenge SC	0	0	0	0	0	0	0
0	GK	Jordan Day	Jr.	Gilbert, AZ (Basha)	Sereno SC	0	0	0	0	0	0	0
23	GK	Taylor Saucier	Fr.	Omaha, NE (Marian)	Toro FC	0	0	0	0	0	0	0
23	GK	Renée McDermott	So.	San Clemente, CA (San Clemente)	Slammers FC	0	0	0	0	0	0	0
