= 2012 Texas A&M Aggies women's soccer team =

American college soccer season

2012 Texas A&M Aggies women's soccer

NCAA Tournament, Sweet 16
- Conference: Big 12 Conference
- U. Soc. Coaches poll: No. 12
- Record: 19-5-1 (10–2–1 Big-12)
- Head coach: G. Guerrieri (20th season)
- Home stadium: Aggie Soccer Stadium

Uniform
Home	Away

2012 SEC soccer standings
	Conf.					Overall
Team	W		L		T	W		L		T
#8 Florida $	11	–	2	–	0	19	–	5	–	1
#14 Texas A&M	10	–	2	–	1	19	–	5	–	1
Tennessee	9	–	3	–	1	14	–	5	–	3
Kentucky	8	–	4	–	1	14	–	7	–	1
Missouri	8	–	5	–	0	14	–	7	–	1
Auburn	7	–	6	–	0	13	–	11	–	1
Arkansas	6	–	6	–	1	9	–	10	–	1
LSU	5	–	6	–	2	9	–	8	–	4
Ole Miss	5	–	8	–	0	13	–	9	–	0
South Carolina	3	–	7	–	3	7	–	10	–	4
Alabama	3	–	8	–	2	8	–	9	–	2
Georgia	3	–	8	–	2	7	–	11	–	2
Vanderbilt	2	–	7	–	4	5	–	10	–	5
Mississippi St.	2	–	10	–	1	9	–	10	–	1
† Tournament Champion NCAA Tournament participants highlighted; Rankings from NSCAA Final Poll

The 2012 Texas A&M Aggies women's soccer team represented Texas A&M University in the 2012 NCAA Division I women's college soccer season. The team belonged to the Southeastern Conference (SEC) and played its home games at Ellis Field. The Aggies were led by G. Guerrieri, who had coached the team since the program's inception in 1993 (20 years).

The 2012 team had 22 roster players, with 14 scholarships to utilize between them.

== 2012 schedule ==
Date	Opponent	Location	Result	Record	Att	Rank
Aug 20, 2012	at UC Irvine	Irvine, CA	W, 2-1	1-0-0	631	14
Aug 22, 2012	at San Diego	San Diego, CA	L, 0-1	1-1-0	562	14
Aug 25, 2012	UTSA	Ellis Field	W, 2-0	2-1-0	4,970	12
Aug 31, 2012	Rutgers	Ellis Field	W, 4-1	3-1-0	2,076	17
Sept 2, 2012	St. Mary's	Ellis Field	W, 1-0	4-1-0	1,667	17
Sept 7, 2012	Long Beach St.	Ellis Field	W, 3-0	5-1-0	1,996	14
Sept 9, 2012	Central Michigan	Ellis Field	W, 2-0	6-1-0	1,624	14
Sept 14, 2012	at LSU	Baton Rouge, LA	W, 1-0	7-1-0	1,910	10
Sept 16, 2012	at Ole Miss	Oxford, MS	W, 4-0	8-1-0	539	10
Sept 21, 2012	South Carolina	Ellis Field	W, 2-0	9-1-0	2,319	10
Sept 23, 2012	Auburn	Ellis Field	W, 2-0	10-1-0	1,891	10
Sept 28, 2012	at Kentucky	Lexington, KY	T, 2-2 2OT	10-1-1	1,006	6
Sept 30, 2012	at Mississippi St.	Starkville, MS	W, 2-0	11-1-1	125	6
Oct 5, 2012	Alabama	Ellis Field	W, 5-0	12-1-1	2,039	5
Oct 7, 2012	Florida	Ellis Field	L, 1-2	12-2-1	2,096	5
Oct 12, 2012	at Arkansas	Fayetteville, AR	W, 3-1	13-2-1	543	9
Oct 14, 2012	at Vanderbilt	Nashville, TN	W, 4-0	14-2-1	415	9
Oct 19, 2012	Tennessee	Ellis Field	L, 0-1	14-3-1	2,481	9
Oct 21, 2012	Georgia	Ellis Field	W, 1-0 2OT	15-3-1	2,055	9
Oct 25, 2012	Missouri	Ellis Field	W, 2-1 OT	16-3-1	3,562	13
SEC Tournament
Oct 31, 2012	vs. South Carolina	Orange Beach, AL	W, 1-0 OT	17-3-1	1,089	13
Nov 2, 2012	vs. Auburn	Orange Beach, AL	L, 0-2	17-4-1	1,120	12
NCAA Tournament
Nov 9, 2012	vs. Stephen F. Austin	Ellis Field	W, 1-0	18-4-1	1,179	15
Nov 16, 2012	vs. Oakland	Tallahassee, FL	W, 3-0	19-4-1	-	15
Nov 16, 2012	vs. Florida St.	Tallahassee, FL	L, 0-4	19-5-1	752	15

== Lineup/formation ==
- 4–3–3 shown
- Mouseover names for stats

== Roster/statistics ==
- Starters highlighted in green

No	Pos	Player	Cl	Hometown	Club	GP	GS	G	A	Pts	Sh	Sog
3	F	Shea Groom	So.	Liberty, MO (Liberty)	KCFC	0	0	0	0	0	0	0
7	F	Annie Kunz	So.	Golden, CO (Wheat Ridge)	Colorado Rush	0	0	0	0	0	0	0
1	F	Allie Bailey	So.	San Diego, CA (Torrey Pines)	San Diego Surf	0	0	0	0	0	0	0
15	F	Kelley Monogue	So.	McKinney, TX (McKinney Boyd)	Dallas Texans	0	0	0	0	0	0	0
22	F	Bianca Brinson	So.	Austin, TX (Hyde Park)	Lonestar SC	0	0	0	0	0	0	0
27	F	Catalina Clavijo	Sr.	Winnipeg, Canada (Shaftesbury)	Manitoba Provincial	0	0	0	0	0	0	0
33	F	Nora Skelton (I)	Sr.	Austin, TX (James Bowie)	Lonestars SC	0	0	0	0	0	0	0
10	M	Beth West	Sr.	Centennial, CO (Grandview)	Real Colorado	0	0	0	0	0	0	0
33	M	Jayne Eadie	Jr.	Lancashire, England (St. Bedes/Oregon St.)	Manchester City FC	0	0	0	0	0	0	0
13	M	Leigh Edwards	So.	Coto de Caza, CA (Santa Margarita Catholic)	So Cal Blues	0	0	0	0	0	0	0
11	M	Janae Cousineau	Fr.	San Clemente, CA (San Clemente)	So Cal Blues	0	0	0	0	0	0	0
8	M	Katie Perry	So.	Mission Viejo, CA (Capistrano Valley)	San Diego Surf	0	0	0	0	0	0	0
19	M	Chelsea Jones	Sr.	Belton, TX (Belton)	Lonestar SC	0	0	0	0	0	0	0
4	D	Meghan Streight	So.	McKinney, TX (McKinney Boyd)	D'Feeters SC	0	0	0	0	0	0	0
5	D	Lyndsey Gnatzig	Sr.	Humble, TX (Atascocita)	Challenge SC	0	0	0	0	0	0	0
2	D	Rachel Lenz	Jr.	Round Rock, TX (Round Rock)	Lonestar SC	0	0	0	0	0	0	0
14	D	Jackie Tondl	Fr.	Omaha, NE (Marian)	Toro SC	0	0	0	0	0	0	0
24	D	Karlie Mueller	Fr.	Sioux Falls, SD (Roosevelt)	Toro SC	0	0	0	0	0	0	0
20	D	Lindsey Witz	Sr.	Temecula, CA (Cal St. San Bernardino)	None	0	0	0	0	0	0	0
0	GK	Jordan Day	So.	Gilbert, AZ (Basha)	Sereno SC	0	0	0	0	0	0	0
23	GK	Renée McDermott	So.	San Clemente, CA (San Clemente)	Slammers FC	0	0	0	0	0	0	0
