= List of college women's soccer career coaching wins leaders =

This is a list of college women's soccer career coaching wins leaders. It is limited to coaches with at least 300 career wins. Anson Dorrance of North Carolina is the all-time leader in both wins and winning percentage with a record of 934–88–53 (.893).

== College women's soccer coaches with 300 wins ==
=== Key ===
*	Active coach in 2026
†	Inducted into United Soccer Coaches Hall of Fame
‡	Inducted into the National Soccer Hall of Fame
	The list includes coaches with 300 wins regardless of division. Coaches with 300 wins at a Division I school (or historic equivalents) are designated with the referenced peach shading.

=== Coaches ===
Statistics are correct through August 20, 2026.

Rank	Name	Years	Wins	Losses	Ties	Pct.	Teams
1	Anson Dorrance†‡	45	934	88	53	.893	North Carolina (1979–2023)
2	Aliceann Wilber†	44	657	146	74	.791	William Smith (1980–2024)
3*	Jerry Smith	40	579	191	90	.726	Santa Clara (1987–present)
4	Len Tsantiris	37	570	201	59	.722	UConn (1981–2017)
5	Joe Russo	31	557	67	45	.866	TCNJ (1990–2021)
6*	Gabe Mejail	47	528	290	75	.633	Wheaton (MA) (1979–1982), Merrimack (1984–present)
7	Pete Felske	33	525	128	39	.787	Wheaton (IL) (1988–2020)
8	G Guerrieri	35	523	192	58	.714	Hardin–Simmons (1988–1989), Texas A&M (1993–2025)
9*	Scott Frey	25	518	36	37	.908	Messiah (2000–present)
10*	Todd Olsen	32	515	132	65	.769	Lynchburg (1994–present)
11	Becky Burleigh	31	513	160	46	.745	Berry (1989–1993), Florida (1995–2020)
12*	Steve Swanson	37	505	179	79	.714	Dartmouth (1990–1995), Stanford (1996–1999), Virginia (2000–present)
13	Brian McManus	31	501	90	54	.819	UC San Diego (1987–2017)
14	Mark Krikorian	28	479	117	40	.785	Franklin Pierce (1990–1995), Hartford (1996–2000), Florida State (2005–2021)
15*	Jennifer Rockwood	32	476	144	68	.741	BYU (1995–present)
16	Nick Cowell	37	472	176	62	.708	Wooster (1989–1990), Trinity (TX) (1991–1998), Baylor (1999–2002), Sewanee (2003–2005), St. Edward's (2006–2025)
17*	Jim Blankenship	36	471	163	51	.725	Lynn (1986–1997), Miami (FL) (1998–2001), Florida Gulf Coast (2007–present)
18	Randy Waldrum	31	470	159	40	.732	Tulsa (1989–1994), Baylor (1996–1998), Notre Dame (1999–2013), Pittsburgh (2018–2024)
18*	Paul Ratcliffe	29	470	108	50	.788	Saint Mary's (1998–2002), Stanford (2003–present)
20*	Marcus Wood	26	454	52	40	.868	Hardin–Simmons (2000–2021), Dallas Baptist (2022–present)
21*	Amy Reifert	37	448	193	74	.678	Chicago (1991–present)
22	Mike Cook	31	444	158	47	.720	Southern Nazarene (1993–1997), Central Oklahoma (1998–2023)
23*	Nikki Izzo-Brown	32	431	153	79	.710	West Virginia Wesleyan (1994), West Virginia (1996–present)
24*	Grant Landy	29	429	118	60	.756	Concordia Portland (1997–2019), Cal Poly Humboldt (2020–present)
25	Chris Petrucelli	32	428	184	54	.683	Notre Dame (1990–1998), Texas (1999–2011), SMU (2012–2021)
25	Laurie Darling Gutheil	28	428	109	44	.775	Saint Rose (1996–2023)
27	Pepe Fernandez	34	426	169	51	.699	Maryville (TN) (1991–2024)
28*	Betty Ann Kempf-Townsley	39	423	268	69	.602	La Salle (1986–1993), Seton Hall (1994–2006), West Chester (2007–present)
29	Terry Gurnett	34	422	135	66	.730	Rochester (1977–2010)
30	Nancy Feldman	34	418	188	63	.672	Lake Forest (1988–1989), Plymouth State (1990–1994), Boston University (1995–2021)
31	David Lombardo	35	415	257	43	.610	Keene State (1981–1987), James Madison (1990–2017)
32	John Daly	31	413	176	57	.683	William & Mary (1987–2018)
33	Leo Weil	28	410	121	43	.752	Johns Hopkins (1992–2019)
34*	Mindy Quigg	31	409	137	71	.720	Ithaca (1994–present)
35*	John Hedlund	32	407	169	55	.689	North Texas (1995–present)
36*	Sue Patberg	32	405	167	74	.684	Minnesota (1993–1999), Georgia (2000–2004), Emory (2005–present)
37	Jeff Hooker	31	404	167	57	.689	Denver (1992–2022)
37*	Carin Jennings-Gabarra	35	404	207	70	.645	Westmont (1987), Navy (1993–present)
39	David Lewis	28	400	121	39	.749	Houghton (1991–2018)
40*	Jim Conlon	25	399	102	43	.773	Wartburg (2000–2007), Washington University (2008–2020), Grand Valley State (2021), Washington University (2022–present)
41*	Joe Bartlinski	24	398	67	33	.832	West Florida (2001–present)
41	Robbie Church	31	398	199	78	.647	Charlotte (1994–1998), Vanderbilt (1999–2000), Duke (2001–2024)
43*	J.B. Belzer	30	396	171	52	.682	Regis (1996–2019), UCCS (2020–present)
43	Denise Lyons	29	396	184	38	.672	Keene State (1992–2020)
45*	Luigi Scire	27	394	121	24	.753	Webster (1999–present)
46*	Phil Benne	37	393	252	64	.599	Roanoke (1989–present)
47*	Jay Entlich	24	388	98	34	.779	Tampa (2000–2001), Columbus State (2004–present)
48*	Melissa Lamie	33	385	227	47	.620	Grove City (1993–present)
49*	Mike Cannon	33	384	168	84	.670	Truman (1993–present)
50*	John Walker	33	380	208	69	.631	Nebraska (1994–present)
51*	Tony da Luz	35	379	247	70	.595	San Diego (1992–1996), Wake Forest (1997–present)
52*	Gail Mann	33	378	174	81	.661	Nazareth (1993–present)
52	Denise Dallamora	40	378	284	72	.564	Brandeis (1980–2019)
54*	Bob Sheehan	30	377	149	50	.698	Northern Kentucky (1997–present)
55*	David Brown	34	376	196	70	.640	Wooster (1991–present)
55	Mike Joy	31	376	194	50	.647	Midway (1992–1996), Tusculum (1997–2022)
57*	Mark Stauffer	25	374	125	31	.735	Misericordia (2000–present)
58	Amanda Cromwell	25	372	128	47	.723	UMBC (1996–1997), UCF (1999–2012), UCLA (2013–2021)
58*	Tim Strange	27	372	116	58	.734	McKendree (1999–present)
60*	Shelley Smith	30	370	181	74	.651	Rhode Island (1997–2000), South Carolina (2001–present)
61	Luis Reis	22	369	82	33	.796	Wheaton (MA) (1997–2016), Transylvania (2017–2018)
62*	Jeffrey Bowers	26	366	119	59	.727	Virginia Wesleyan (2000–present)
62*	Julie Woodward	30	366	164	70	.668	Seattle (1997–present)
62*	Jim Tursi	34	366	232	78	.599	Portland (1986–1988), Willamette (1993–2007), Lewis & Clark (2010–present)
65	Sheila Miech	25	365	117	31	.742	Wisconsin-Stevens Point (1987–2011)
65*	Troy Fabiano	29	365	112	60	.736	Wisconsin–Parkside (1998–2014), Milwaukee (2015–2021), Kentucky (2022–present)
67	Peter Albright	37	359	281	58	.556	Johnson State (1981–1995), Richmond (1996–2017)
68*	Brian Lee	33	358	234	74	.593	Furman (1994–2004), LSU (2005–2018), Rice (2019–present)
69*	Scott Leacott	26	357	98	46	.758	Rowan (1999–present)
69	Karen Hoppa	32	357	236	69	.591	UCF (1993–1998), Auburn (1999–2024)
71*	Patrick Baker	36	356	268	69	.563	North Carolina Wesleyan (1989–1993), Penn (1994–1998), Florida State (1999–2004), Georgia (2005–2009), Rollins (2010), Florida Atlantic (2013–present)
72*	Brandon Koons	27	355	114	51	.732	Otterbein (1999–present)
72*	Danny Owens	21	355	65	18	.831	William Carey (2006–2025), Southern Miss (2026–present)
74	Neil Cunningham	27	350	98	40	.758	SCAD (1995–2000), Washington & Lee (2001–2021)
74	Gail Murphy	29	350	166	49	.663	Southwestern (TX) (1993–1996), Denison (1997–2022)
74	Adam Hunter	25	350	120	26	.732	Butler Community College (2007-present) Dodge City Community College (2001-2005)
76	Kanute Drugan	26	348	149	28	.690	Aurora (1997–2011), Washington College (2012–2013), UT Dallas (2014–2022)
76*	Phil Pincince	43	348	287	65	.544	Brown (1977–2015), Rhode Island College (2022–present)
78*	Dan Weiler	23	347	93	46	.761	Concordia Moorhead (2002–2012), Christopher Newport (2013–2019), Johns Hopkins (2020–present)
79*	Dave DiIanni	24	346	100	50	.748	Grand Valley State (2003–2013), Iowa (2014–2025), Michigan (2026–present)
79*	Darryl Longabaugh	29	346	144	41	.690	Mississippi College (1997–present)
81*	Chris Cissell	28	340	159	48	.665	William Jewell (1999–2010), Kansas City (2011–2019), Grand Canyon (2020–present)
82*	Erica Dambach	24	339	136	39	.697	Dartmouth (2000–2002), Harvard (2006), Penn State (2007–present)
82*	Travis Connell	23	339	90	53	.758	Western Washington (2003–present)
84*	Todd Ditmar	32	337	212	46	.605	Bay Path (1993–2004), Westfield State (2005–present)
84*	Paula Wilkins	26	337	132	74	.689	Penn State (2001–2006), Wisconsin (2007–present)
86*	Ben Sohrabi	33	336	224	54	.591	Lambuth (1994–1995), Radford (1996–present)
87*	Kathy Brawn	33	332	233	67	.578	Colgate (1991–2019), Mount Holyoke (2020), Smith (2022–present)
88*	Jonathan Meade	26	331	156	42	.665	Mount Vernon Nazarene (2000–2008), Ohio Dominican (2009–2015), Cedarville (2016–present)
88	Tim Alexander	26	331	160	29	.664	Edgewood (1993–2018)
90	Jeff Bailey	21	330	79	28	.787	Franklin Pierce (1996–2016)
90*	Brooks Monaghan	27	330	153	44	.669	Memphis (2000–present)
90*	Lori Walker-Hock	32	330	236	70	.573	Kansas (1995–1996), Ohio State (1997–present)
93	Steve Spirk	30	329	197	45	.616	Wilmington (OH) (1992–2021)
93*	Danny Sanchez	25	329	135	60	.685	Metro State (2002–2007), Wyoming (2008–2011), Colorado (2012–present)
93*	Steve Holeman	32	329	228	69	.581	Auburn (1993), Ole Miss (1995–2009), Georgia (2010–2014), Lamar (2016–2021), Texas State (2022–present)
96	John Leaney	24	327	106	36	.736	UC San Diego (1984–1986), Macalester (1989–2009)
97*	Mark Duble	32	325	208	51	.600	Covenant (1994–present)
97	Markus Roeders	24	325	148	51	.669	Marquette (1996–2019)
99*	Magnus Nilerud	27	324	163	39	.653	Bridgeport (1999–2021), Fordham (2022–present)
100*	Michael Moynihan	30	322	189	81	.612	Milwaukee (1997–2011), Northwestern (2012–present)
100	Lorenzo Canalis	25	322	134	39	.690	Berry (1995–2019)
100	Patrick Farmer	28	322	174	58	.634	Ithaca (1987–1993), Penn State (1994–2000), Tennessee Tech (2003), Syracuse (2004–2007), Cornell (2012–2016), Transylvania (2018–2021)
100	Jeff Parker	25	322	148	37	.672	Saint Peter's (1998–1999), Stevens (2000–2023)
100*	Tim Ward	29	322	158	79	.647	Pepperdine (1998–present)
100*	Dave Barrett	26	322	126	52	.696	Illinois Wesleyan (2001–2017), Fairfield (2018–present)
106	Alex Crozier	32	320	234	70	.569	Cal Poly (1997–2024)
107*	Lewis Theobald	18	319	57	31	.822	Central Missouri (2007–present)
108*	T.R. Bell	29	318	170	32	.642	Lake Forest (1997–present)
109*	Noreen Herlihy	31	317	210	63	.591	Slippery Rock (1995–2014), Akron (2015–2021), Indiana (PA) (2022–2024), Slippery Rock (2025–present)
109*	Chris Flint	29	317	223	48	.580	MCLA (1996–1999), Bryant (2000–2014), JWU Providence (2015–present)
109*	Jay Hoffman	22	317	86	39	.761	Centre (2004–present)
112	Angela Kelly	26	316	174	55	.630	Tennessee (2000–2011), Texas (2012–2025)
113*	Sean Yengo	28	314	196	61	.603	Wisconsin–Eau Claire (1997–present)
114	Mike Tucker	22	313	124	33	.701	Dayton (1995–2016)
115*	Stefani Webb	29	311	149	49	.659	Dallas (1997–2004), UT Tyler (2005–present)
115	Bill Hempen	32	311	273	64	.529	Duke (1988–2000), Colorado (2001–2011), Colorado State (2013–2020)
115	Jim Rudy	28	311	160	28	.651	UCF (1981–1987), UMass (1988–2008)
115	Brian Speck	25	311	111	35	.719	Union (NY) (1995–2020)
119*	Krissy Turner	32	310	194	67	.602	Lafayette (1995–1997), Monmouth (1998–2021), Penn (2022–present)
119	Leigh Sears	29	310	192	46	.608	Marietta (1994–1999), Hope (2000–2002, 2004–2023)
119*	Ray Leone	32	310	213	64	.583	Berry (1986–1988), Creighton (1989–1993), Clemson (1999–2000), Arizona State (2001–2006), Harvard (2007–2015), Maryland (2016–2021), St. Bonaventure (2026–present)
122	Ali Omar	22	308	109	29	.723	Winona State (1995–2016)
122*	Scott Mejia	26	308	155	46	.650	Lakeland (1999–2000), Augustana (IL) (2001–present)
124*	Jeff Hosler	21	305	87	38	.753	Alma (2006–2013), Grand Valley State (2014–2020), Michigan State (2021–present)
124	Matthew Yelton	17	305	82	15	.777	King (TN) (1998–2001), Lee (2002–2014)
124*	Dave Reyelts	26	305	188	48	.608	St. Scholastica (2000–present)
127*	Greg Cane	35	304	251	69	.542	St. Scholastica (1990–1993), Minnesota Duluth (1994–present)
128	Randy Hanson	20	303	73	35	.780	Puget Sound (1995–2004, 2006–2015)
128*	Todd Yelton	25	303	122	70	.683	Samford (2002–present)
130*	Todd Dyer	33	302	226	64	.564	Longwood (1994–present)
131*	Dave Nolan	23	301	101	68	.713	Georgetown (2004–present)
132	Lesle Gallimore	30	300	243	58	.547	San Diego State (1990–1993), Washington (1994–2019)
132*	Brian Parker	24	300	130	52	.676	Frostburg State (2002–present)

== See also ==
- United Soccer Coaches
- List of U.S. college men's soccer career coaching wins leaders
