= 2009 Texas A&M Aggies women's soccer team =

American college soccer season

2009 Texas A&M Aggies women's soccer

NCAA tournament, Sweet 16
- Conference: Big 12 Conference
- U. Soc. Coaches poll: No. 13
- Record: 15–7–3 (6–2–2 Big-12)
- Head coach: G. Guerrieri (17th season)
- Home stadium: Aggie Soccer Stadium

Uniform
Home	Away

The 2009 Texas A&M Aggies women's soccer team represented Texas A&M University in the 2009 NCAA Division I women's college soccer season. The team belongs to the Big 12 Conference and played its home games at Aggie Soccer Stadium. The Aggies were led by G. Guerrieri, who has coached the team since the program's inception in 1993 (17 years).

The Aggies finished the season 15–7–3 and advanced to the Sweet 16 of the 2009 NCAA tournament before falling to Florida State 2–1 in 2OT in Tallahassee, FL.

The 2009 team had 28 roster players, with 14 scholarships to utilize between them.

2009 Big 12 Conference women's soccer standings
	Conf.						Overall
Team	W		L		T	PCT	W		L		T	PCT
Missouri ‍†‍‍	7	–	1	–	2	.800	13	–	6	–	3	.659
No. 13 Texas A&M ‍‍‍^{y}	6	–	2	–	2	.700	15	–	7	–	3	.660
Colorado ‍‍‍	6	–	4	–	0	.600	9	–	10	–	0	.474
Nebraska ‍‍‍	5	–	3	–	2	.600	11	–	5	–	4	.650
Oklahoma State ‍‍‡‍^{y}	5	–	5	–	0	.500	15	–	7	–	2	.667
Texas ‍‍‍	4	–	3	–	3	.550	9	–	9	–	3	.500
Baylor ‍‍‍	3	–	4	–	3	.450	8	–	6	–	5	.553
Kansas ‍‍‍	4	–	6	–	0	.400	12	–	8	–	2	.591
Texas Tech ‍‍‍	3	–	4	–	3	.450	8	–	8	–	4	.500
Oklahoma ‍‍‍	2	–	7	–	1	.250	7	–	10	–	2	.421
Iowa State ‍‍‍	2	–	8	–	0	.200	7	–	9	–	4	.450
† – Conference champion ‡ – Tournament champion y – Invited to the NCAA tournament Rankings from NSCAA Coaches

== Schedule/Results ==
Date	Opponent	Location	Result	Record	Att	Rank
Aug 22, 2009	(8) USC	Aggie Soccer Stadium	W, 3–0	1–0–0	2,713	7
Aug 28, 2009	Purdue	Aggie Soccer Stadium	L, 2–3	1–1–0	6,589	6
Aug 30, 2009	UTSA	Aggie Soccer Stadium	W, 3–0	2–1–0	2,752	6
Sept 4, 2009	at (14) California	Berkeley, CA	L, 0–1	2–2–0	275	10
Sept 6, 2009	at St. Mary's	Moraga, CA	W, 2–1	3–2–0	313	10
Sept 12, 2009	at (1) North Carolina	Chapel Hill, NC	L, 2–0	3–3–0	1,846	13
Sept 18, 2009	(2) Portland	Aggie Soccer Stadium	W, 3–1	4–3–0	3,542	13
Sept 20, 2009	Sam Houston St.	Aggie Soccer Stadium	W, 4–0	5–3–0	2,822	13
Sept 25, 2009	at Baylor	Waco, TX	W, 1–0	6–3–0 (1–0–0)	804	10
Sept 27, 2009	at Oklahoma	Norman, OK	L, 2–3	6–4–0 (1–1–0)	570	10
Oct 2, 2009	(19) Kansas	Aggie Soccer Stadium	W, 4–3	7–4–0 (2–1–0)	2,606	15
Oct 4, 2009	Missouri	Aggie Soccer Stadium	T, 4–4 2-OT	7–4–1 (2–1–1)	2,211	15
Oct 9, 2009	at Oklahoma St.	Stillwater, OK	W, 1–0	8–4–1 (3–1–1)	405	14
Oct 11, 2009	Loyola-Chicago	Aggie Soccer Stadium	W, 2–1 OT	9–4–1	2,209	14
Oct 16, 2009	at Iowa State	Ames, IA	W, 1–0	10–4–1 (4–1–1)	435	14
Oct 18, 2009	at Nebraska	Lincoln, NE	L, 1–2	10–5–1 (4–2–1)	485	14
Oct 23, 2009	Colorado	Aggie Soccer Stadium	W, 2–0	11–5–1 (5–2–1)	2,622	20
Oct 25, 2009	Texas Tech	Aggie Soccer Stadium	T, 0–0 2-OT	11–5–2 (5–2–2)	2,866	20
Oct 30, 2009	at Texas	Aggie Soccer Stadium	W, 4–0	12–5–2 (6–2–2)	4,385	20
Big 12 tournament
Nov 4, 2010	vs. Baylor	San Antonio, TX	W, 2–0	13–5–2	1,072	20
Nov 6, 2010	vs. Texas	San Antonio, TX	W, 5–1	14–5–2	2,038	20
Nov 8, 2010	vs. Oklahoma St.	San Antonio, TX	L, 0–1	14–6–2	1,563	20
NCAA tournament
Nov 13, 2010	vs. Memphis	Baton Rouge, LA	W, 3–1	15–6–2	843	22
Nov 15, 2010	at (10) LSU	Baton Rouge, LA	T, 1–1 2-OT (4–2 PK)	15–6–3	833	22
Nov 20, 2010	at (5) Florida St.	Tallahassee, FL	L, 1–2 2-OT	15–7–2	1,659	22

== Lineup/Formation ==
- 4–3–3 was utilized for most of the season
- Mouseover names for stats

== Roster/Statistics ==
- Starters highlighted in green

No	Pos	Player	Cl	Hometown	Club	GP	GS	G	A	Pts	Sh	Sog
7	M	Rachel Shipley	Jr.	Plano, TX (Plano West)	Dallas Texans	25	23	9	9	27	87	33
6	F	Whitney Hooper	Jr.	Houston, TX (Klein Forest)	Challenge SC	25	23	10	4	24	64	24
11	D	Bri Young	So.	Castle Pines North, CO (Chaparral)	Real Colorado	25	14	6	7	19	36	14
3	F	Katie Hamilton	So.	Spring, TX (Klein)	Challenge SC	20	16	8	1	17	51	27
12	F	Nora Skelton	Fr.	Austin, TX (James Bowie)	Lonestars SC	25	15	4	4	12	31	16
33	M	Alyssa Mautz	Jr.	O'Fallon, MO (Ft. Zumwalt West/St. Louis)	St. Louis SC	25	20	4	2	10	66	27
5	F	Kim Castleberry	Fr.	McKinney, TX (McKinney)	Dallas Texans	25	10	2	1	5	42	13
4	M	Amber Gnatzig (I-RS)	Sr.	Humble, TX (Humble)	Challenge SC	7	7	2	1	5	11	7
22	F	Cydne Currie	Sr.	Irving, TX (MacArthur)	Dallas Inter SC	22	0	2	0	4	18	8
9	M	Becca Herrera	So.	Aurora, CO (Grandview)	Real Colorado	10	8	0	4	4	4	1
21	D	Mary Grace Schmidt	Fr.	Orange, CA (Mater Dei)	Slammers SC	25	23	1	1	3	23	9
19	D	Emily Peterson	Sr.	Tulsa, OK (Jenks)	Tulsa SC	23	22	1	1	3	8	4
8	M	Nicole Ketchum	Jr.	Cypress, TX (Cy-Fair)	Challenge SC	24	16	0	3	3	13	3
15	F	Jen Kmezich	So.	Larkspur, CO (Douglas County)	Real Colorado	19	1	1	0	2	6	4
27	F	Catalina Clavijo	Fr.	Winnipeg, Manitoba CA (Shaftesbury)	Manitoba Provincial	3	0	1	0	2	2	1
19	M	Chelsea Jones	Fr.	Belton, TX (Belton)	Lonestars SC	22	5	0	2	2	26	6
24	D	Rachel Balaguer	So.	Austin, TX (St. Stephen's)	Lonestars SC	25	25	0	2	2	4	1
28	F	Christina Navalta	Fr.	Carrollton, TX (Creekview)	FC Dallas	6	0	0	2	2	1	0
5	D	Lyndsey Gnatzig	Fr.	Humble, TX (Atascocita)	Challenge SC	20	17	0	1	1	0	0
1	GK	Kelly Dyer	Jr.	Germantown, TN (St. Agnes Academy)	Memphis Mercury	22	12	0	1	1	0	0
26	M	Megan Majewski	So.	Cypress, TX (Cy-Fair)	Challenge SC	4	0	0	0	0	3	1
23	D	Lisel Kraus	So.	Sachse, TX (Sachse)	FC Dallas	1	0	0	0	0	3	1
17	F	Kat Armstrong	Jr.	Dime Box, TX (Caldwell)	Challenge SC	9	1	0	0	0	2	2
25	M	Carly Wohlers	So.	Plano, TX (Plano)	FC Dallas	7	0	0	0	0	1	0
14	D	Shawn-tae Greene	So.	Mesa, AZ (Dobson)	Gilbert Arsenal	1	0	0	0	0	0	0
0	GK	Kristen Arnold	Jr.	Centennial, CO (Cherry Creek)	Real Colorado	24	13	0	0	0	0	0
20	M	Beth West (I-RS)	So.	Centennial, CO (Grandview)	Real Colorado	4	3	0	0	0	3	3
16	M	Raven Tatum (I-RS)	So.	Dallas, TX (The Hockaday School)	D'Feeters SC	0	0	0	0	0	0	0

== Season Review ==
=== Non-Conference ===
- Coming Soon

=== Conference ===
- Coming Soon

=== NCAA tournament ===
- Coming Soon

== Accolades/Notes ==
- Texas A&M made its 15th straight NCAA tournament appearance.
- Texas A&M finished #23 in the RPI and was not awarded a seed for the first time since 1998.
- 2009 was the first time in program history the Aggies started the NCAA tournament on the road.
- Texas A&M reached at least the Sweet 16 round of the NCAA tournament for the 9th time.
- Texas A&M finished the season ranked #13, the 14th time in 15 years the program has finished ranked in the Top 15.
- Defender Emily Peterson won the prestigious Lowe’s Senior CLASS Award.
- Texas A&M averaged 3,211 fans per game at the Aggie Soccer Stadium, its 3rd highest in school history.

NSCAA All-Central Region
Pos	Player	Team
M	Rachel Shipley	1st Team
F	Whitney Hooper	2nd Team
D	Emily Peterson	3rd Team

All-Big 12
Pos	Player	Team
M	Rachel Shipley	1st Team
F	Whitney Hooper	2nd Team
F	Alyssa Mautz	2nd Team
D	Emily Peterson	2nd Team

Aggie Team Awards
Award	Player
Leading Scorer	Whitney Hooper
Assists Leader	Rachel Shipley
Offensive MVP	Katie Hamilton & Whitney Hooper
Midfield MVP	Rachel Shipley
Defensive MVP	Emily Peterson
Perseverance Award	Katie Hamilton
Newcomer of the Year	Mary Grace Schmidt
12th Man Award	Cydne Currie
Spirit of Aggieland Award	Amber Gnatzig
Most Improved	Katie Hamilton
Iron Aggie	Amber Gnatzig
