= 2010 Texas A&M Aggies women's soccer team =

College football team season

2010 Texas A&M Aggies women's soccer

Big 12 Champions

NCAA tournament, 2nd Round
- Conference: Big 12 Conference
- U. Soc. Coaches poll: No. 16
- Record: 15–5–3 (8–1–1 Big-12)
- Head coach: G. Guerrieri (18th season)
- Home stadium: Aggie Soccer Stadium

Uniform
Home	Away

2010 Big 12 Conference women's soccer standings
	Conf.						Overall
Team	W		L		T	PCT	W		L		T	PCT
No. 16 Texas A&M ‍†‍‍^{y}	8	–	1	–	1	.850	15	–	5	–	3	.717
No. 5 Oklahoma State ‍‍‡‍^{y}	8	–	2	–	0	.800	20	–	4	–	2	.808
Nebraska ‍‍‍	5	–	4	–	1	.550	13	–	7	–	1	.643
Oklahoma ‍‍‍^{y}	5	–	4	–	1	.550	12	–	8	–	3	.587
Texas ‍‍‍^{y}	4	–	3	–	3	.550	11	–	6	–	4	.619
Missouri ‍‍‍	5	–	5	–	0	.500	7	–	10	–	2	.421
Texas Tech ‍‍‍	4	–	5	–	1	.450	11	–	8	–	1	.575
Colorado ‍‍‍	4	–	5	–	1	.450	8	–	10	–	2	.450
Baylor ‍‍‍	4	–	6	–	0	.400	11	–	7	–	2	.600
Iowa State ‍‍‍	3	–	7	–	0	.300	8	–	10	–	2	.450
Kansas ‍‍‍	1	–	9	–	0	.100	6	–	13	–	0	.316
† – Conference champion ‡ – Tournament champion y – Invited to the NCAA tournament Rankings from NSCAA Coaches

The 2010 Texas A&M Aggies women's soccer team represented Texas A&M University in the 2010 NCAA Division I women's college soccer season. The team belongs to the Big 12 Conference and played its home games at Aggie Soccer Stadium. The Aggies were led by G. Guerrieri, who has coached the team since the program's inception in 1993 (18 years).

The Aggies finished the season 15–5–3 and won the Big 12 regular season championship with an 8–1–1 record. They advanced to the 2nd Round of the 2010 NCAA tournament before falling to Minnesota 2–0 in icy conditions in Minneapolis, MN.

The 2010 team had 26 roster players, with 14 scholarships to utilize between them.

== Schedule and results ==
Date	Opponent	Location	Result	Record	Att	Rank
Aug 20, 2010	(1) North Carolina	Aggie Soccer Stadium	L, 0–3	0–1–0	2,822	8
Aug 22, 2010	St. John's	Aggie Soccer Stadium	W, 3–0	1–1–0	2,089	8
Aug 27, 2010	(16) Virginia Tech	Aggie Soccer Stadium	W, 5–3	2–1–0	5,560	9
Aug 29, 2010	(21) Washington St.	Aggie Soccer Stadium	W, 1–0	3–1–0	1,891	9
Sept 3, 2010	Davidson	Aggie Soccer Stadium	W, 5–1	4–1–0	2,584	7
Sept 10, 2010	at Indiana	Bloomington, IN	W, 5–2	5–1–0	721	7
Sept 12, 2010	at Purdue	West Lafayette, IN	W, 2–1	6–1–0	256	7
Sept 17, 2010	at (3) Portland	Portland, OR	L, 0–1	6–2–0	4,517	6
Sept 19, 2010	Cal St. Northridge	Aggie Soccer Stadium	W, 5–0	7–2–0	1,705	6
Sept 24, 2010	Colorado	Aggie Soccer Stadium	L, 1–2 OT	7–3–0 (0–1–0)	1,991	5
Sept 26, 2010	at Nebraska	Lincoln, NE	W, 2–1	8–3–0 (1–1–0)	597	5
Oct 1, 2010	at Kansas	Lawrence, KS	W, 1–0	9–3–0 (2–1–0)	520	10
Oct 8, 2010	Baylor	Aggie Soccer Stadium	W, 2–0	10–3–0 (3–1–0)	2,202	10
Oct 10, 2010	Texas Tech	Aggie Soccer Stadium	W, 4–0	11–3–0 (4–1–0)	1,874	10
Oct 15, 2010	at Iowa State	Ames, IA	W, 1–0 OT	12–3–0 (5–1–0)	506	7
Oct 17, 2010	at Missouri	Columbia, MO	W, 4–2	13–3–0 (6–1–0)	1,038	7
Oct 22, 2010	Oklahoma	Aggie Soccer Stadium	W, 2–1 2OT	14–3–0 (7–1–0)	2,724	6
Oct 24, 2010	(5) Oklahoma St.	Aggie Soccer Stadium	W, 1–0	15–3–0 (8–1–0)	2,517	6
Oct 29, 2010	at Texas	Austin, TX	T, 1–1 2OT	15–3–1 (8–1–1)	2,829	6
Big 12 tournament
Nov 3, 2010	vs. Colorado	San Antonio, TX	T, 0–0 2OT (5–4 PK)	15–3–2	497	6
Nov 5, 2010	vs. Oklahoma	San Antonio, TX	L, 0–1 OT	15–4–2	957	6
NCAA tournament
Nov 12, 2010	vs. North Dakota St.	Minneapolis, MN	T, 1–1 2OT (4–3 PK)	15–4–3	896	9
Nov 14, 2010	at Minnesota	Minneapolis, MN	L, 0–2	15–5–3	n/a	9

== Lineup/Formation ==
- 4–5–1 was utilized for most of the season
- Mouseover names for stats

== Roster/statistics ==
- Starters highlighted in green

No	Pos	Player	Cl	Hometown	Club	GP	GS	G	A	Pts	Sh	Sog
33	F	Alyssa Mautz	Sr.	O'Fallon, MO (Ft. Zumwalt West/St. Louis)	St. Louis SC	23	23	12	5	29	93	34
7	M	Rachel Shipley	Sr.	Plano, TX (Plano West)	Dallas Texans	23	21	10	5	25	59	25
9	F	Merritt Mathias	Jr.	Birmingham, AL (Oak Mountain/North Carolina)	Birmingham United	20	20	9	5	23	85	43
11	D	Bri Young	Jr.	Castle Pines North, CO (Chaparral)	Real Colorado	20	19	5	7	17	71	36
6	F	Whitney Hooper	Sr.	Houston, TX (Klein Forest)	Challenge SC	23	10	4	6	14	36	21
4	M	Amber Gnatzig	Sr.	Humble, TX (Humble)	Challenge SC	21	15	0	5	5	26	11
20	M	Beth West	So.	Centennial, CO (Grandview)	Real Colorado	20	16	0	4	4	16	7
2	D	Rachel Lenz	Fr.	Round Rock, TX (Round Rock)	Lonestars SC	22	22	1	1	3	16	3
12	F	Nora Skelton	So.	Austin, TX (James Bowie)	Lonestars SC	22	5	1	0	2	12	3
26	M	Megan Majewski	Jr.	Cypress, TX (Cy-Fair)	Challenge SC	7	1	1	0	2	9	3
17	F	Kat Armstrong	Sr.	Dime Box, TX (Caldwell)	Challenge SC	12	0	1	0	2	6	4
8	M	Nicole Ketchum	Sr.	Cypress, TX (Cy-Fair)	Challenge SC	22	6	1	0	2	2	2
16	M	Raven Tatum	So.	Dallas, TX (The Hockaday School)	D'Feeters SC	23	17	0	2	2	31	11
5	D	Lyndsey Gnatzig	So.	Humble, TX (Atascocita)	Challenge SC	18	12	0	2	2	1	0
21	M	Mary Grace Schmidt	So.	Orange, CA (Mater Dei)	Slammers SC	22	20	0	1	1	8	1
25	M	Carly Wohlers	Jr.	Plano, TX (Plano)	FC Dallas	14	0	0	1	1	2	0
24	D	Rachel Balaguer	Jr.	Austin, TX (St. Stephen's)	Lonestars SC	23	23	0	1	1	1	1
0	GK	Kristen Arnold	Sr.	Centennial, CO (Cherry Creek)	Real Colorado	13	12	0	1	1	0	0
28	F	Christina Navalta	So.	Carrollton, TX (Creekview)	FC Dallas	5	0	0	0	0	1	0
19	M	Chelsea Jones	So.	Belton, TX (Belton)	Lonestars SC	10	0	0	0	0	1	0
27	F	Catalina Clavijo	So.	Winnipeg, Manitoba CA (Shaftesbury)	Manitoba Provincial	4	0	0	0	0	0	0
23	D	Lisel Kraus	Jr.	Sachse, TX (Sachse)	FC Dallas	1	0	0	0	0	0	0
1	GK	Kelly Dyer	Sr.	Germantown, TN (St. Agnes Academy)	Memphis Mercury	15	11	0	0	0	0	0
18	D	Kat Bartley	Fr.	College Station, TX (A&M Consolidated)	Challenge SC	0	0	0	0	0	0	0
20	F	Sara Ellis (RS)	Fr.	The Woodlands, TX (The Woodlands)	Challenge SC	0	0	0	0	0	0	0
3	F	Katie Hamilton (I-RS)	Jr.	Spring, TX (Klein)	Challenge SC	0	0	0	0	0	0	0

== Season Review ==
=== Non-Conference ===
Texas A&M opened a highly anticipated season by hosting annual rival North Carolina in College Station. Many thought the Aggies were heavy favorites considering their talented and experienced roster, while the Tar Heels (although ranked #1 coming off their national title) were completely rebuilding with several freshmen starting their first game on the road. Instead, the Tar Heels came out on fire, attacking the Aggies early and often with precision passing and scoring a quick goal in the 3rd minute by Meghan Klingenberg from 30 yards out. Although A&M temporarily righted the ship, UNC added a second goal in the 20th minute off a header by Ali Hawkins on a corner kick. The Aggies' best chance to score came in the 28th minute when Alyssa Mautz struck the crossbar with a shot that then bounced off the Tar Heel goalkeeper out-of-bounds. North Carolina added a 3rd goal for the 3–0 win in the 60th minute, but by that point in the match they had complete control and were basically on cruise control. The loss for the Aggies was only the third season-opening loss and was a crushing blow both for the team and the fans (2,822 in attendance), and it signaled that this team might not be quite at the lofty level that most thought it would be before the season.

However, A&M would respond to this disappointment by ripping off 6 straight wins, with a notable 5–3 win over Virginia Tech in the annual Fish Camp game that drew 5,560 fans to the Aggie Soccer Stadium. A&M's first road trip of the season resulted in wins over Indiana (5–2) and Purdue (2–1), but the following weekend the anticipated rematch with #3 Portland resulted in a 1–0 loss in Portland that was not as close as the score indicated. The Pilots controlled the match from the outset, dominating possession and firing off multiple shots on goal early in the match. If not for a heroic effort from GK Kelly Dyer, who made several spectacular saves after replacing the injured Kristen Arnold, A&M would have lost by a large margin. The Aggies were able to conclude the non-conference slate with a home win over an overmatched Cal State Northridge side 5–0.

=== Conference ===
A&M had not won a Big 12 championship since 2007, a fact that loomed large in the minds of the coaches and players, who had dedicated themselves to regaining the conference crown in 2010. Things got off to a rocky start with a shocking 2–1 OT loss to Colorado at home after a lightning delay that sent many fans home because of the late start. CU's Lizzy Herzl netted the winning goal in the 99th minute, sending the stunned crowd home in silence. However, as they did after the tough loss to UNC in the home opener, the Aggies re-focused and won 8 straight games. A big win over Nebraska (which was moving to the Big Ten in 2011) in Lincoln 2–1 (which snapped the Huskers' 18-game home winning streak) highlighted the next five games as A&M usually took control of matches early and posted four straight shutouts over Kansas, Baylor, Texas Tech, and Iowa State.

The penultimate moment of the season probably came at Missouri in a hard fought 4–2 win in a game that was nationally televised by ESPNU. F Merritt Mathias netted 2 goals, while M Rachel Shipley and F Nora Skelton each added a goal in the come from behind effort. The impressive win came with a high price, however, as M Beth West went down with an injury that would plague her the rest of the season. With 3 games left, A&M only needed to win their next 2 at home against Oklahoma and league leader Oklahoma State to clinch a share of the conference title. The Sooners proved to be a difficult out as they forced A&M to extra time before F Alyssa Mautz concluded her terrific match by scoring the winning goal in the 2OT. In the de facto Big 12 championship game, A&M took an early lead on #5 Oklahoma State when F Whitney Hooper was taken down in the penalty box for a penalty kick. M Rachel Shipley calmly put away the goal for a 1–0 lead that would hold up for the win, clinching A&M's 11th Big 12 title. The Aggies' defense, which had arguably been an achilles' heel over the years, continued their stellar play, stifling the OSU offense and limiting the Cowgirls to 3 shots on goal. The back line of Bri Young, Rachel Balaguer, Mary Schmidt, and freshman sensation Rachel Lenz was possibly A&M's best defense in school history, especially in the second half of the season. The regular season ended with a 1–1 draw at Texas in a game that was played at a fierce pace, with F Alyssa Mautz scoring the goal for the Aggies.

At the Big 12 tournament in San Antonio, A&M escaped an upset bid by Colorado (in their last meeting before CU moved to the new Pac-12 in 2011) in the quarterfinals by advancing via penalty kicks 5–4 after a 0–0 draw in regulation and OT. But the upset did occur in a semifinal loss to Oklahoma, 1–0 in OT. The mounting injuries on A&M's side became a major factor entering the postseason, which would be confirmed the following week in Minnesota.

=== NCAA tournament ===
Texas A&M was awarded a 4-seed by the NCAA tournament committee, but they were surprisingly sent to Minneapolis, MN in a pod with Minnesota, Creighton, and North Dakota St. The Aggies were clearly disappointed with this seeding and not being able to host for the second straight year after hosting the 1st/2nd Round games for 14 consecutive years (1995–2008). A&M battled cool conditions (low 40s) to forge a tie with North Dakota St. 1–1 through 2OT, but prevailed in a penalty shootout 4–3 when GK Kelly Dyer saved a Bison PK to advance to the 2nd Round. M Rachel Shipley converted a PK in the 7th minute to give A&M an early lead before the Bison tied the game in the 75th minute.

The weather conditions for the 2nd Round game against Minnesota almost postponed the match entirely. 82,000 cubic feet (2,300 m^{3}) of snow had to be cleared from the playing surface the morning of the game, while temperatures hovered around 32 degrees at kickoff. Clearly out of their element, the Aggies struggled to find possession or any rhythm as the Gophers quickly took control of the match early and scored their first goal in the 13th minute off a corner kick. GK Kristen Arnold (8 saves) played valiantly, keeping the Aggies in the match with multiple point blank saves in the 1st Half as the Gophers had an 11–1 shot advantage at the half. A&M played better in the 2nd half and their best chance came in the 55th minute when F Whitney Hooper slipped on the wet field during a breakaway on goal. Minnesota put the game away in the 76th minute off a rebound in the box for the 2–0 victory.

A&M's season ended abruptly and was considered very disappointing considering the team's high expectations before the season began. Several key injuries to starters throughout the season derailed the Aggies chances for a deep tournament run. Beth West, Bri Young, and Katie Hamilton were all lost with season-ending injuries, while others such as Merritt Mathias and Whitney Hooper battled injuries down the stretch but still managed to play in the post-season. It was a bitter end for the 8 seniors that had won 2 Big 12 titles and advanced to both the Elite 8 and Sweet 16 in their careers, although they still were one of the winningest classes in school history.

== Accolades/Notes ==
- Texas A&M made its 16th straight NCAA tournament appearance.
- Texas A&M finished #14 in the RPI and was awarded a #4 seed in the NCAA tournament.
- 2010 was only the 2nd time (and 2nd straight year) the Aggies started the NCAA tournament on the road.
- Texas A&M failed to advance to at least the Sweet 16 round of the NCAA tournament for only the 3rd time since 1999.
- After starting the season 15–3–0, the Aggies finished the season 0–2–3.
- Texas A&M finished the season ranked #16, its 2nd lowest final ranking in school history.
- Texas A&M won its 11th Big 12 championship (7 regular season, 4 tourney).
- 5 Aggies were named to the All-Big 12 First Team, tied for the most in school history (1996).
- Midfielder Rachel Shipley was named one of 10 finalists for the Lowe’s Senior CLASS Award.
- GK Kelly Dyer finished her career with the 2nd-best Goals Against Average in school history at 0.93 per game.
- Texas A&M averaged 2,542 fans per game at the Aggie Soccer Stadium, its lowest average home attendance since 2003.

NSCAA All-American
Pos	Player	Team
D	Bri Young	4th Team

Soccer America Freshman All-American
Pos	Player	Team
D	Rachel Lenz	1st Team

NSCAA All-Central Region
Pos	Player	Team
F	Merritt Mathias	1st Team
M	Rachel Shipley	1st Team
D	Bri Young	1st Team
D	Rachel Lenz	2nd Team

All-Big 12
Pos	Player	Team
F	Alyssa Mautz	1st Team
F	Merritt Mathias	1st Team
M	Rachel Shipley	1st Team
D	Bri Young	1st Team
D	Rachel Lenz	1st Team

Aggie Team Awards
Award	Player
Leading Scorer	Alyssa Mautz
Assists Leader	Bri Young
Offensive MVP	Alyssa Mautz
Midfield MVP	Alyssa Mautz
Defensive MVP	Rachel Lenz
Perseverance Award	Beth West
Newcomer of the Year	Rachel Lenz
12th Man Award	Megan Mejewski
Spirit of Aggieland Award	Kat Armstrong & Nicole Ketchum
Most Improved	Bri Young
Iron Aggie	Alyssa Mautz
