= 2008 Texas A&M Aggies women's soccer team =

American college soccer season

2008 Texas A&M Aggies women's soccer

NCAA tournament, Elite 8
- Conference: Big 12 Conference
- U. Soc. Coaches poll: No. 7
- Record: 18–5–1 (7–2–1 Big-12)
- Head coach: G. Guerrieri (16th season)
- Home stadium: Aggie Soccer Stadium

Uniform
Home	Away

2008 Big 12 Conference women's soccer standings
	Conf.						Overall
Team	W		L		T	PCT	W		L		T	PCT
No. 13 Oklahoma State ‍†‍‍^{y}	7	–	1	–	2	.800	18	–	1	–	4	.870
No. 7 Texas A&M ‍‍‍^{y}	7	–	2	–	1	.750	18	–	5	–	1	.771
No. 17 Missouri ‍‍‡‍^{y}	7	–	3	–	0	.700	16	–	5	–	2	.739
No. 22 Colorado ‍‍‍^{y}	6	–	2	–	2	.700	14	–	5	–	4	.696
Nebraska ‍‍‍	6	–	4	–	0	.600	10	–	9	–	1	.525
No. 18 Texas ‍‍‍^{y}	5	–	2	–	3	.650	13	–	4	–	4	.714
Kansas ‍‍‍^{y}	4	–	5	–	1	.450	13	–	8	–	2	.609
Texas Tech ‍‍‍	3	–	7	–	0	.300	8	–	10	–	1	.447
Oklahoma ‍‍‍	2	–	7	–	1	.250	3	–	15	–	1	.184
Baylor ‍‍‍	1	–	7	–	2	.200	5	–	11	–	3	.342
Iowa State ‍‍‍	0	–	8	–	2	.100	5	–	12	–	2	.316
† – Conference champion ‡ – Tournament champion y – Invited to the NCAA tournament Rankings from NSCAA Coaches

The 2008 Texas A&M Aggies women's soccer team represented Texas A&M University in the 2008 NCAA Division I women's college soccer season. The team belongs to the Big 12 Conference and played its home games at Aggie Soccer Stadium. The Aggies were led by G. Guerrieri, who has coached the team since the program's inception in 1993 (16 years).

The Aggies finished the season 18–5–1 and advanced to the Elite 8 of the 2008 NCAA tournament before falling to North Carolina 2–1 in 2OT in Chapel Hill, NC.

The 2008 team had 28 roster players, with 14 scholarships to utilize between them.

== Schedule ==
Date	Opponent	Location	Result	Record	Att	Rank
Aug 22, 2008	Rhode Island	Aggie Soccer Stadium	W, 3–2	1–0–0	6,712	10
Aug 24, 2008	McNeese St.	Aggie Soccer Stadium	W, 9–0	2–0–0	2,792	10
Aug 29, 2008	(2) North Carolina	Aggie Soccer Stadium	L, 2–3	2–1–0	5,642	11
Aug 31, 2008	Indiana	Aggie Soccer Stadium	W, 3–1	3–1–0	2,388	11
Sept 5, 2008	at Virginia Tech	Blacksburg, VA	W, 3–1	4–1–0	603	11
Sept 7, 2008	vs. (17) Wake Forest	Blacksburg, VA	W, 2–1	5–1–0	103	11
Sept 19, 2008	(16) California	Aggie Soccer Stadium	W, 1–0	6–1–0	3,323	8
Sept 21, 2008	at Rice	Houston, TX	W, 2–1	7–1–0	710	8
Sept 26, 2008	at (9) Texas	Austin, TX	T, 0–0	7–1–1 (0–0–1)	5,585	7
Sept 28, 2008	at Baylor	Waco, TX	W, 1–0	8–1–1 (1–0–1)	764	7
Oct 3, 2008	(10) Oklahoma St.	Aggie Soccer Stadium	W, 2–1	9–1–1 (2–0–1)	3,378	7
Oct 5, 2008	Oklahoma	Aggie Soccer Stadium	W, 5–0	10–1–1 (3–0–1)	2,586	7
Oct 10, 2008	Nebraska	Aggie Soccer Stadium	W, 2–0	11–1–1 (4–0–1)	3,285	7
Oct 12, 2008	Iowa State	Aggie Soccer Stadium	W, 2–0	12–1–1 (5–0–1)	2,626	7
Oct 17, 2008	at Kansas	Lawrence, KS	L, 0–1	12–2–1 (5–1–1)	499	6
Oct 19, 2008	(20) Missouri	Aggie Soccer Stadium	L, 0–3	12–3–1 (5–2–1)	3,815	6
Oct 24, 2008	at Texas Tech	Lubbock, TX	W, 1–0	13–3–1 (6–2–1)	n/a	11
Oct 26, 2008	at (12) Colorado	Boulder, CO	W, 2–1 OT	14–3–1 (7–2–1)	2,013	11
Oct 30, 2008	Houston Baptist	Aggie Soccer Stadium	W, 6–2	15–3–1	2,369	9
Big 12 tournament
Nov 5, 2008	vs. Kansas	San Antonio, TX	L, 2–4	15–4–1	1,054	8
NCAA tournament
Nov 14, 2008	vs. Texas St.	Aggie Soccer Stadium	W, 5–2	16–4–1	1,375	13
Nov 16, 2008	(22) Washington	Aggie Soccer Stadium	W, 3–1	17–4–1	993	13
Nov 23, 2008	at (8) Florida	Gainesville, FL	W, 2–1	18–4–1	1,182	13
Nov 28, 2008	at (3) North Carolina	Chapel Hill, NC	L, 1–2 2-OT	18–5–1	2,686	13

== Lineup and formation ==
- 4–4–2 was utilized for most of the season
- Mouseover names for stats

== Roster and statistics ==
- Starters highlighted in green

No	Pos	Player	Cl	Hometown	Club	GP	GS	G	A	Pts	Sh	Sog
5	M	Laura G. Robinson	Sr.	Houston, TX (Memorial)	Challenge SC	23	23	9	5	23	44	25
7	M	Rachel Shipley	So.	Plano, TX (Plano West)	Dallas Texans	24	21	5	10	20	58	25
10	M	Beth West	Fr.	Centennial, CO (Grandview)	Real Colorado	24	23	5	8	18	50	21
6	F	Whitney Hooper	So.	Houston, TX (Klein Forest)	Challenge SC	22	20	6	5	17	35	19
11	D	Bri Young	Fr.	Castle Pines North, CO (Chaparral)	Real Colorado	24	24	6	3	15	56	23
15	F	Jennifer Kmezich	Fr.	Larkspur, CO (Douglas County)	Real Colorado	22	6	6	3	15	29	13
33	F	Alyssa Mautz	So.	O'Fallon, MO (Ft. Zumwalt West/St. Louis)	St. Louis SC	19	9	5	3	13	27	15
4	M	Amber Gnatzig	Jr.	Humble, TX (Humble)	Challenge SC	23	22	4	4	12	16	8
9	D	Becca Herrera	Fr.	Aurora, CO (Grandview)	Real Colorado	23	20	1	9	11	13	8
22	F	Cydne Currie	Jr.	Irving, TX (MacArthur)	Dallas Inter SC	7	7	4	0	8	15	6
19	F	Inge Harding	So.	Dripping Springs, TX (Dripping Springs)	Lonestar SC	18	1	3	1	7	23	11
24	D	Rachel Balaguer	Fr.	Austin, TX (St. Stephen's)	Lonestars SC	23	18	1	1	3	9	3
25	M	Carly Wohlers	Fr.	Plano, TX (Plano)	FC Dallas	11	0	1	0	2	4	2
14	D	Shawn-tae Greene	Fr.	Mesa, AZ (Dobson)	Gilbert Arsenal	1	0	1	0	2	1	1
18	D	Micah Stephens	Sr.	Flower Mound, TX (Flower Mound)	Sting Dallas	16	9	0	2	2	0	0
16	F	Raven Tatum	Fr.	Dallas, TX (The Hockaday School)	D'Feeters SC	24	13	0	1	1	1	12
2	M	Natalie Currie	Jr.	Irving, TX (MacArthur)	Dallas Inter SC	13	5	0	1	1	7	4
17	D	Kat Armstrong	So.	Dime Box, TX (Caldwell)	Challenge SC	13	0	0	0	0	7	2
26	M	Megan Majewski	Fr.	Cypress, TX (Cy-Fair)	Challenge SC	4	0	0	0	0	5	1
16	D	Emily Peterson	Jr.	Tulsa, OK (Jenks)	Tulsa SC	21	19	0	0	0	3	1
23	D	Lisel Kraus	Fr.	Sachse, TX (Sachse)	FC Dallas	4	0	0	0	0	1	0
1	GK	Kelly Dyer	So.	Germantown, TN (St. Agnes Academy)	Memphis Mercury	23	21	0	0	0	1	0
21	GK	Sarah Pierson	Fr.	Missouri City, TX	Eclipse SC	5	0	0	0	0	0	0
20	D	Christy End	So.	St. Louis, MO (Nerinx Hall Catholic)	St. Louis SC	3	0	0	0	0	0	0
3	F	Katie Hamilton	Fr.	Spring, TX (Klein)	Challenge SC	4	0	0	0	0	0	0
0	GK	Kristen Arnold	Jr.	Centennial, CO (Cherry Creek)	Real Colorado	3	3	0	0	0	0	0
8	M	Nicole Ketchum (I-RS)	Jr.	Cypress, TX (Cy-Fair)	Challenge SC	0	0	0	0	0	0	0

== Accolades ==
- Texas A&M made its 14th straight NCAA tournament appearance.
- Texas A&M was awarded one of four #3 seeds in the NCAA tournament.
- Texas A&M reached the Elite 8 round of the NCAA tournament for the 4th time.
- Texas A&M finished the season ranked #7, tied for the 3rd best finish in program history.
- Texas A&M averaged 3,176 fans per game at the Aggie Soccer Stadium, which set a school record and finished #2 nationally.

Soccer Buzz All-American
Pos	Player	Team
D	Bri Young	3rd Team

Soccer Buzz Freshman All-American
Pos	Player	Team
D	Bri Young	1st Team
M	Beth West	2nd Team

NSCAA All-Central Region
Pos	Player	Team
D	Bri Young	2nd Team

All-Big 12
Pos	Player	Team
GK	Kelly Dyer	1st Team
M	Amber Gnatzig	2nd Team
D	Bri Young	2nd Team

Aggie Team Awards
Award	Player
Leading Scorer	Laura Grace Robinson
Assists Leader	Rachel Shipley
Offensive MVP	Laura Grace Robinson
Midfield MVP	Laura Grace Robinson
Defensive MVP	Emily Peterson
Newcomer of the Year	Beth West
Perseverance Award	Micah Stephens
12th Man Award	Jennifer Kmezich
Spirit of Aggieland Award	Nicole Ketchum
