= Alex Sobel (basketball) =

American basketball player (born 2000)

No. 31 – SOMB
- Position: Power forward / center
- League: Nationale Masculine 1

Personal information
- Born: February 8, 2000 (age 26) Setauket, New York, U.S.
- Listed height: 6 ft 8 in (2.03 m)
- Listed weight: 230 lb (104 kg)

Career information
- High school: Ward Melville (East Setauket, New York)
- College: Middlebury (2018–2023); Sacred Heart (2023–2024)
- NBA draft: 2024: undrafted
- Playing career: 2024–present

Career history
- 2024–2025: Hapoel Haifa
- 2025–present: Maritime Boulogne

Career highlights
- Second-team All-NEC (2024); D3hoops.com National Player of the Year (2023)

Alex Sobel (born February 8, 2000) is an American professional basketball player for Maritime Boulogne of the Nationale Masculine 1. He played college basketball for Middlebury College and Sacred Heart University.

Sobel was second in the nation in both blocks and blocks per game, led the New England Small College Athletic Conference in points and rebounds per game, and was named the D3hoops.com National Player of the Year in the 2022–23 season. The following year, he attended Sacred Heart and played in the Northeast Conference, again leading the conference in blocks per game (and was sixth in the entire NCAA) and in two-point field-goal percentage, while finishing fourth in rebounds per game.

== Early life and high school career ==
Sobel's hometown is Setauket, New York. He attended Ward Melville High School, where he played for the basketball team and was named a Suffolk County All Star. He is 6 ft 8 in (203 cm) tall, and weighs 230 pounds (100 kg).

== College career ==
=== Middlebury College ===
Sobel first attended Middlebury College, studying for a double major in computer science and American studies. There, playing for the Middlebury College Panthers in the New England Small College Athletic Conference, in 2018–19 he averaged 13.9 minutes, 6.1 points, 5.5 rebounds per game (leading the conference in blocks), and had a field goal percentage of .564. In 2019–20, he averaged 19.5 minutes, 11.4 points, and 6.8 rebounds per game. Between 2020 and 2021, because of the COVID-19 pandemic, Sobel took a year and a half off from school.

In 2021–22, he averaged 28.8 minutes, 18.3 points, 12.1 rebounds per game, and was captain of the team. In 2021–22, Sobel was named First-Team All-NESCAC, D3hoops.com First-Team All-Region 1, NABC First-Team All-District I, and D3hoops.com Fourth-Team All-American.

In 2022–23, Sobel was 2nd in the nation in blocks (101) and blocks per game (3.88), and led the NESCAC in points (19.4), rebounds (11.8), and blocks per game (3.88). He was named a Small College Basketball's Clarence “Bevo” Francis Award Finalist, the D3hoops.com National Player of the Year, a D3hoops.com First-Team All-American, a NABC First-Team All-American, to the D3hoops.com First-Team All-Region 1, the D3hoops.com Region 1 Most Outstanding Player, to the NABC First-Team All-District I, the NABC District I Player of the Year the NESCAC Player & Defensive Player of the Year, to the First-Team All-NESCAC, and a 2x USBWA National Player of the Week. He was also a finalist for the Bevo Francis Award, which recognizes the top small college basketball player in the United States for a given season.

=== Sacred Heart University ===
Sobel then attended Sacred Heart University, and played basketball for the Sacred Heart Pioneers in the Northeast Conference. In 2023–24 he played 31 games (30 starts), and averaged 12.3 points and 7.4 rebounds (4th in the conference), 1.2 steals, and 2.8 blocks (leading the conference, and 6th in the NCAA) per game, as he had a .591 two-point field goal percentage (leading the conference). He was named to the All-NEC Second Team. He scored a season high 23 points in a loss against Albany on December 19, 2023.

== Professional career ==
=== Hapoel Haifa (2024–present) ===
On September 19, 2024, he signed with Hapoel Haifa of the Israeli Basketball Premier League (ISBL).
