= Washington University Bears =

- University: Washington University in St. Louis
- Nickname: Bears
- NCAA: Division III
- Conference: University Athletic Association; North Coast Athletic Conference (football only)
- Athletic director: Anthony J. Azama
- Location: St. Louis, Missouri
- Varsity teams: 19
- Football stadium: Francis Field
- Basketball arena: WU Field House
- Baseball stadium: Kelly Field
- Other venues: Francis Gymnasium
- Colors: Red and green
- Fight song: Fight for Washington
- Website: washubears.com

The Washington University Bears are the athletic teams of Washington University in St. Louis, located in St. Louis, Missouri, United States. Washington University is currently a member of the National Collegiate Athletic Association at the NCAA Division III level. The Bears compete in the University Athletic Association (UAA).

The Bears have won 22 NCAA Division III Championships—one in women's outdoor track and field (2017), one in women's indoor track and field (2017), one in women's soccer (2016), one in women's cross country (2011), one in men's tennis (2008), two in men's basketball (2008, 2009), five in women's basketball (1998–2001, 2010), and ten in women's volleyball (1989, 1991–1996, 2003, 2007, 2009) – and 197 UAA titles in 15 different sports. The Bears have also had 1256 Academic All-Americans.

In 2017, Anthony J. Azama was named as the new director of athletics. The Athletic Department was previously headed by current Illinois athletic director Josh Whitman, and John Schael, who had served as Director of Athletics for 36 years since 1978. The 2000 Division III Central Region winner of the National Association of Collegiate Directors of Athletics/Continental Airlines Athletics Director of the Year award, Schael helped orchestrate the Bears' transformation into one of the top departments in Division III.

== Sports sponsored ==
Men's sports	Women's sports
Baseball	Basketball
Basketball	Cross country
Cross country	Golf
Football	Soccer
Soccer	Softball
Swimming & Diving	Swimming & Diving
Tennis	Tennis
Track and field	Track and field
	Volleyball
† – Track and field includes both indoor and outdoor

=== Baseball ===
Under current head coach Pat Bloom's leadership, the WashU baseball program has become one of the top teams in NCAA Division III. In 2020, the team was top-ranked nationally according to d3baseball.com before having their season cancelled, and they followed that up in the 2021 season with their first team appearance at the Division III World Series, finishing inside the top four.

Under Bloom's coaching, the team has had two members progress to MLB. Pitcher Ryan Loutos made his debut for the St. Louis Cardinals in 2024, and shortstop Caleb Durbin, made his debut with the Milwaukee Brewers in 2025.

=== Men's basketball ===
In men's basketball, WashU repeated as national champions in 2009, defeating Richard Stockton College 61–52. In 2008, WashU defeated Amherst 90–68 to win the university's first men's basketball national championship. WashU lost to Virginia Wesleyan College in the 2007 NCAA Final Four, but defeated Wooster in the third place game.

Seven players have been named as an All-American by D3hoops.com. Chris Jeffries, 2003 (2nd team), Troy Ruths, 2007 (HM), 2008 (Player of the Year, 1st team), Aaron Thompson, 2009 (1st) & 2010 (3rd), and Sean Wallis, 2009 (2nd) & 2010 (1st), Dylan Richter, 2012 (HM), and Chris Klimek, 2014 (HM).

Head Coach Mark Edwards retired after the 2017–2018 season. He ended his career with a record of 685–293 for a .700 winning percentage over his 37 years on the sideline. He also won numerous coaching awards:

Coaching Awards:

National Association of Basketball Coaches Division III Coach of the Year	2008 and 2009
SmallCollegeHoops.com Molten/DIII News Division III Coach of the Year	2002, 2008, 2009
D3hoops.com Division III Coach of the Year	2009
D3hoops.com Division III Midwest / Region Coach of the Year	2007, 2008, 2009

=== Women's basketball ===
Washington University’s women’s basketball has claimed the NCAA Women's Division III Basketball Championship a total of five times (more than that of any other school), including 2010, and won four consecutive national titles from 1998 to 2001. From 1998 to 2001 they established what was then the longest winning streak in Division III women's basketball history, at 81 games; that streak was not surpassed until the NYU Violets did so in 2026. On March 20, 2010, WashU defeated Hope College 65–59 in the 2010 national championship game. Women's basketball has made the championship game four out of five years between 2007 and 2011, losing to DePauw University in 2007 (55–52) and in 2009 losing to George Fox University by the final score of 65–53. In 2011 the Bears failed to repeat as champions when they fell in the championship game 64–55 to Amherst College Women's basketball won the DIII championship four straight seasons from 1999 to 2001. The team was coached by Nancy Fahey from 1986 to 2017, after which she became the head coach at Illinois. In addition to the 5 National Championships under Fahey, the Bears have appeared in the NCAA DIII National Tournament 28 straight seasons from 1990 to 2017. The Bears reached the tournament in 1988 and missed making it in 1989 before starting the current streak.

=== Cross country ===
Jeff Stiles has been the head coach of the men's and women's cross country teams since 2001. The women's cross country team claimed the 2011 NCAA Division III Championship under Stiles after a runner-up finish in 2010. The men's team claimed 3rd place at the NCAA Division III Championship in 2011, signifying the highest combined men's and women's program finishes in school history. In 2007, the women placed third at the NCAA Division III Championship meet. The Bears also ran to third-place finishes at the 2005 and 2004 NCAA Division III Championships. Washington U. came in fourth place at the 2006 NCAA Championships. The women also won their third-straight Midwest Region title in 2007. In 2009, after going unranked all year, the men qualified for the national championship and finished seventh place at the national meet. Under Stiles, the men's and women's cross country teams have won 19 UAA titles (11 women, eight men), qualified as a team for the NCAA Championships 23 times (14 women, nine men). Since 2001, the Bears have also produced 25 All-Americans and 14 Academic All-Americans.

=== Men's soccer ===
Going into the 2017 season, the Bears have made 23 NCAA Division III Men's Soccer Championship appearances, the WashU men's soccer program is one of the nation's most storied. Since the inception of the tournament in 1974, the Bears have finished as national runners-up three times (1978, 1985, 1987). The Bears have also posted a 30–22–3 (.577) NCAA tournament record through their last appearance in 2021. Washington University has a 633-314-110 (.651) record since their first season in 1959. Between 1978 and 1999, the Bears reached the tournament 16 out of 22 seasons, including six straight seasons (1990–1995).

The Bears are coached by Andrew Bordelon, who joined WashU in 2024 after serving as an assistant coach at the University of Wisconsin.

Joe Carenza, Sr., a member of the National Soccer Hall of Fame, was the first coach at WashU and was there from 1958 to 1964. Following two seasons without a team, Mike Kessler would take the helm for five seasons but saw the teams struggle while going a poor 14–27–6 (.362) during his tenure.

After two seasons with Jack Kinealy as head coach, the Bears would replace him with Joe Carenza Jr. He is a St. Louis native and he would lead the Bears to a level of dominance during his 13 season as head coach as he compiled a record of 158–69–21 (.679) and holds the second most wins as a coach at WashU, behind only Joe Clarke.

Another native of St. Louis coached the Bears from 1987 to 1996, Ty Keough racked up the highest winning percentage as a head coach (.723) and ranks third in wins with 136.

Joe Clarke, was the longest-serving and winningest head coach in WashU men's soccer history. A St.Louis native, played college soccer and coached at Saint Louis University. During his fourteen seasons coaching the Billkens, Clarke compiled a 205–74–30 record, taking the team to the NCAA tournament twelve times. On May 9, 1997, Clarke moved to Division III at Washington University in St. Louis. Clarke compiled a 275-141-55 record in 26 seasons as head coach.

=== Women's soccer ===
The WashU women's soccer team are three-time NCAA tournament champions, having won in 2016, 2024, and 2025. The women's soccer team was the National Runner-Up at the NCAA Division III Championships in 2009, 2015, and 2023, and made it to the quarterfinals in 2011, 2012, and 2013. The women's soccer team has made 17 NCAA appearances and captured 12 UAA Championships.

WashU women's soccer is coached by Jim Conlon, who has led the Bears to two national titles and 11 UAA championships since 2008. In his 16 seasons as head coach, Conlon has a record of 280-44-36 (.827). In the 2024 and 2025 seasons, WashU did not lose one time en route to two consecutive national championships.

=== Softball ===
Since the inception of the Washington University softball program in 2000, the team has captured 10 UAA championships and has made 15 trips to the NCAA Tournament, including its 2007 College World Series runner-up finish.

=== Swimming and diving ===
The Swimming and Diving teams are led by 18th-year head coach Brad Shively. In 2009, the Washington University men's and women's swimming teams combined to break four school records on the final day of the 2009 NCAA Division III Swimming and Diving Championships as the WashU men placed seventh overall and the women came in 14th place. In 2005–2006, Shively led the Red and Green to their top finishes in program history. The women placed fifth at the NCAA Championships, while the men took sixth. Additionally, Seniors Michael Slavik (24-time All-American) and Eric Triebe (26-time All-American) won the first (50 free – 20.46 Michael Slavik) and second (200 free – 1:39.12 Eric Triebe) individual national titles in Washington University history. Since 1979, 56 Bears student-athletes have earned 304 All-America citations. From 1924 through 1928 they were Missouri Valley Conference men's swimming champions.

=== Track and field ===
The men's and women's track and field teams have had a total of seven NCAA top 10 team finishes since 2009 when coaches Jeff Stiles and Lane Lohr took over the program. In the 2012 Indoor season, the WashU women placed 3rd at the NCAA Women's Division III Indoor Track and Field Championships which was tied for the highest finish in school history back in 2009. In 2015, the women recorded the new record for the highest-ever finish at the NCAA Women's Division III Outdoor Track and Field Championships by claiming third place. In 2017 the women won the indoor and outdoor NCAA Women's Division III Track and Field Championships The highest for the men in the outdoor championships was a 4th-place finish in 2011. Also in 2011, the men recorded an 8th-place finish (the highest for the school at the time) at the indoor championships. In 2022 the men won the NCAA Men's Division III Indoor Track and Field Championships.

The Bears have won 15 University Athletic Association titles since 2009 (4 women's, 11 men's), never finishing below 3rd place. The bears have also had seven NCAA Division III National Champions since 2008: two in the women's pole vault (2008 Indoor, 2014 Outdoor), two in the women's steeplechase (2014 and 2015 Outdoor), one in the women's 5k (2015 Indoor), and two in the men's hurdles (2011 Outdoor, 2012 Indoor). Under Stiles and Lohr, the bears have had 54 individuals and four relay teams achieve All-America finishes and 14 Academic All-Americans. Liz Phillips is the only three-time NCAA Elite 90 Award winner in the history of the award and was also named the 2012 Division III Women's Cross Country/Track & Field Academic All-America of the Year as well as the 2012–13 NCAA Woman of the Year.

=== Volleyball ===
WashU women's volleyball team has enjoyed the most success in the sport's history earning national championships in 1989, 1991, 1992, 1993, 1994, 1995, 1996, 2003, 2007, and 2009. In 2009, the Bears defeated Juniata College 3–1 in the Championship game.

== Championships ==
=== National championships ===
Sport	Years
Basketball (M)	2008, 2009
Basketball (W)	1998, 1999, 2000, 2001, 2010
Cross Country (W)	2011, 2018
Indoor Track & Field (W)	2017, 2026
Outdoor Track & Field (W)	2017, 2024
Indoor Track & Field (M)	2022
Soccer (W)	2016, 2024, 2025
Tennis (M)	2008
Tennis (W)	2025
Volleyball (W)	1989, 1991, 1992, 1993, 1994, 1995, 1996, 2003, 2007, 2009

== Facilities ==
=== Francis Field ===
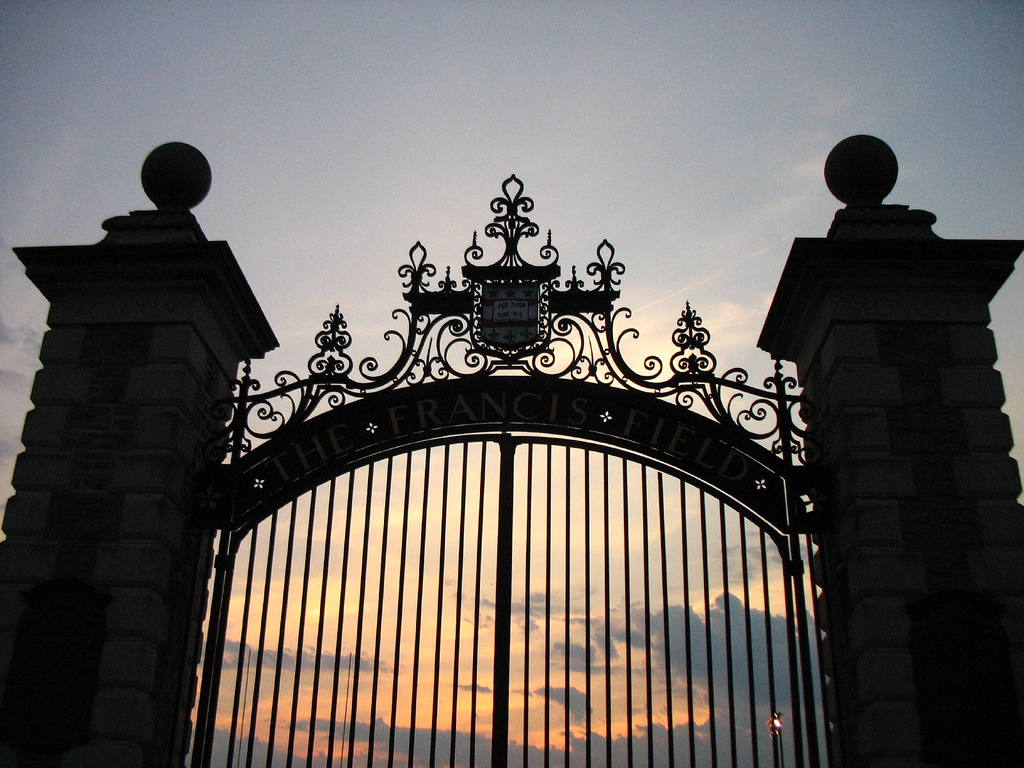
Gates at Francis Field

Washington University in St. Louis is home of Francis Field, the main stadium of the 1904 Summer Olympics. Francis Field is also home of the football, soccer, and track and field teams.

=== Washington University Field House ===
The Washington University Field House is a 3,000-seat, 17,250 square feet (1,603 m^{2}), multi-purpose arena located on the Wash U. campus. The Field House serves as the home for Bears men's and women's basketball teams and the volleyball team.

=== Kelly Field ===
Kelly Field serves as the home for Washington University Bears baseball.

=== Francis Gymnasium ===
Francis Gymnasium was built for the 1904 World's Fair and 1904 Summer Olympics and is currently part of the Athletic Complex. It now houses Millstone pool; built in 1985, the Millstone pool is an 8-lane pool with an adjustable bulkhead making it from 25 yards to 25 meters in length.
