= Joe Clarke (soccer) =

American soccer player and coach

Personal information
- Date of birth: November 27, 1953 (age 72)
- Place of birth: St. Louis, Missouri, United States
- Position: Defender

Youth career
- 1972–1975: Saint Louis Billikens

Senior career*
Years	Team	Apps	(Gls)
1976–1977	St Louis Stars	30	(0)
1978–1981	California Surf	82	(5)
1980–1981	California Surf (indoor)	15	(27)
1981–1982	St. Louis Steamers (indoor)	30	(30)
1982–1986	St. Louis Kutis		

Managerial career
- 1983–1996: Saint Louis Billikens
- 1997–2023: Washington University Bears
- * Club domestic league appearances and goals

Joe "Joey" Clarke (born November 27, 1953) is an American former soccer defender and former college soccer coach. Clarke spent six seasons in the North American Soccer League and one in the Major Indoor Soccer League. He coached the Saint Louis Billikens and Washington University Bears.

== Player ==
=== Youth and college ===
Clarke grew up in St. Louis, Missouri and began playing soccer as a youth at St. Thomas More Elementary School. He attended McBride High School, but when the school closed between his junior and senior year, he moved to Normandy Senior High School, graduating in 1972. Following his graduation from high school, Clarke entered Saint Louis University where he played on the Billiken's soccer team from 1972 to 1975. At the time, St. Louis was the dominant college soccer team. The Billikens won the 1972 and 1973 NCAA Men's Soccer Championship, falling to Howard University in the 1974 final. In 1975, Clarke's senior season, he earned third team All-Americana recognition. He graduated with a bachelor's degree in marketing in 1976. In 2009 Clarke was named as a defender to the St Louis University Half Century team.

=== Professional ===
In 1976, the St. Louis Stars of the North American Soccer League (NASL) drafted Clarke. While he signed with them, he continued to work on his degree during the first part of the 1976 season. Even after graduating, Clarke continued with his education while playing for the Stars, enrolling in St. Louis University's law school. In 1977, the Stars were sold to new ownership and moved to Anaheim where the team became known as the California Surf. When the Surf folded after the 1981 season, the team sold Clarke's contract to the St. Louis Steamers of Major Indoor Soccer League (MISL). The Steamers Coach, Al Trost, released him before the end of the 1981–1982 season. Following his release by the Steamers, he joined the semi-pro St. Louis Kutis S.C. in 1982 and played with them until 1986. In 1986, Kutis won the National Challenge Cup championship.

== Coach ==
When the Stars moved to California, Clarke was in the middle of earning his Juris Doctor degree. However, he completed his degree after transferring to Pepperdine University, where he met and married his first wife Susan. They had two children. He is currently married to Cindy Jensen.

When the Steamers released him, Clarke decided to retire from playing professionally and pursue a legal career. While interviewing with law firms in St. Louis, Clarke heard about the retirement of Harry Keough, head soccer coach at Saint Louis University. Despite his lack of coaching experience, the university hired Clarke in 1982. During his fourteen seasons coaching the Billikens, Clarke compiled a 205–74–30 record, taking the team to the NCAA tournament twelve times.

On May 9, 1997, Clarke moved to Division III at Washington University in St. Louis, replacing Ty Keough, Harry Keough's son. He remains head coach at Washington University.

Clarke was inducted into the St. Louis Soccer Hall of Fame in 2007.
