= 2009 NCAA Division I women's soccer tournament =

2009 NCAA women's soccer tournament
Women's College Cup (semifinals & final)

Tournament details
- Country: United States
- Dates: November 12–December 6, 2009
- Teams: 64

Final positions
- Champions: North Carolina Tar Heels (20th title, 24th College Cup)
- Runners-up: Stanford Cardinal (1st title match, 3rd College Cup)
- Semifinalists: Notre Dame Fighting Irish (11th College Cup); UCLA Bruins (6th College Cup)

Tournament statistics
- Matches played: 63
- Goals scored: 172 (2.73 per match)
- Attendance: 69,358 (1,101 per match)
- Top goal scorer(s): Sydney Leroux, UCLA

Awards
- Best player: Offensive–Casey Nogueira (UNC); Defensive–Whitney Engen (UNC)

The 2009 NCAA Division I women's soccer tournament (also known as the 2009 Women's College Cup) was the 28th annual single-elimination tournament. It was used to determine the national champion of NCAA Division I women's collegiate soccer. The semifinals and championship game were played at the Aggie Soccer Complex in College Station, Texas from December 4–6, 2009, while the preceding rounds were played at various sites across the country from November 12–28.

North Carolina defeated Stanford in the final, 1–0, to win their twentieth national title. The Tar Heels (23–3–1) were coached by Anson Dorrance.

The most outstanding offensive player (for the second consecutive year) was Casey Nogueira from North Carolina, and the most outstanding defensive player was Whitney Engen, also from North Carolina. Nogueira and Engen, alongside nine other players, were named to the All-Tournament team.

The tournament's leading scorer was Sydney Leroux from UCLA, with 8 goals.

== Qualification ==
All Division I women's soccer programs were eligible to qualify for the tournament. The tournament field remained fixed at 64 teams.

== Format ==
Just as before, the final two rounds, deemed the Women's College Cup, were played at a pre-determined neutral site. All other rounds were played on campus sites at the home field of the higher-seeded team. The only exceptions were the first two rounds, which were played at regional campus sites. The top sixteen teams hosted four team-regionals on their home fields (with some exceptions, noted below) during the tournament's first weekend.

=== National seeds ===
#1 Seeds	#2 Seeds	#3 Seeds	#4 Seeds
Florida State (16–4–1); North Carolina (17–3–1); Stanford (20–0–0); UCLA (17–2–1)	Boston College (15–3–2); Notre Dame (17–3–1); Portland (18–1–0); South Carolina (17–3–2)	Florida (15–5–2); UCF (16–4–1); Virginia Tech (14–7–0); Wake Forest (13–5–2)	LSU (14–4–4); Maryland (12–5–2); Penn State (12–5–2); Santa Clara (13–6–1)

=== Teams ===
Stanford Regional
Seed	School	Conference	Berth Type	Record
	Arizona State	Pac-10	At-large	9-7-3
2	Boston College	ACC	At-large	15-3-2
	Boston U.	America East	Automatic	14-5-2
	BYU	Mountain West	At-large	17-3-2
	Connecticut	Big East	At-large	10-7-2
	Harvard	Ivy League	Automatic	9-6-1
	Michigan State	Big Ten	At-large	11-4-4
	Milwaukee	Horizon	Automatic	12-5-3
	Northern Arizona	Big Sky	Automatic	10-8-2
	Oklahoma State	Big 12	Automatic	15-7
4	Santa Clara	West Coast	At-large	13-6-1
1	Stanford	Pac-12	Automatic	20-0
3	UCF	Conference USA	At-large	16-4-1
	UC Santa Barbara	Big West	Automatic	9-9-3
	USC	Pac-10	At-large	12-6-2
	Wisconsin	Big Ten	At-large	9-5-5

North Carolina Regional
Seed	School	Conference	Berth Type	Record
	Davidson	Southern	Automatic	12-9-1
	Duke	ACC	At-large	8-8-4
	Georgia	SEC	At-large	14-5-1
	High Point	Big South	Automatic	7-14-2
	Kennesaw State	Atlantic Sun	Automatic	11-6
	Loyola (MD)	MAAC	Automatic	15-4-3
4	Maryland	ACC	At-large	12-5-2
	Monmouth	Northeast	Automatic	15-4-1
1	North Carolina	ACC	Automatic	17-3-1
	Rutgers	Big East	At-large	13-3-4
2	South Carolina	SEC	Automatic	17-3-2
	UNC-Wilmington	CAA	Automatic	13-7-1
	Villanova	Big East	At-large	11-5-5
3	Wake Forest	ACC	At-large	13-5-2
	Washington State	Pac-10	At-large	13-5-2
	West Virginia	Big East	At-large	9-6-6

UCLA Regional
Seed	School	Conference	Berth Type	Record
	Boise State	WAC	Automatic	13-6-4
	Colgate	Patriot	Automatic	11-6-3
	Dayton	Atlantic 10	Automatic	16-0-5
	Denver	Sun Belt	Automatic	17-5-1
	Marquette	Big East	At-large	15-5-2
	Mississippi	SEC	At-large	13-5-2
	Murray State	Ohio Valley	Automatic	11-8-2
4	Penn State	Big Ten	Automatic	12-5-2
2	Portland	West Coast	Automatic	18-1
	San Diego	West Coast	At-large	12-6-2
	San Diego State	Mountain West	Automatic	14-3-5
	St. John's	Big East	At-large	13-6-1
1	UCLA	Pac-10	At-large	17-2-1
	Virginia	ACC	At-large	9-5-5
3	Virginia Tech	ACC	At-large	14-7
	Washington	Pac-10	At-large	11-5-4

Florida State Regional
Seed	School	Conference	Berth Type	Record
	Ark.-Pine Bluff	SWAC	Automatic	11-6-3
	Auburn	SEC	At-large	10-8-3
	California	Pac-10	At-large	10-8-1
	Central Michigan	MAC	Automatic	16-3-3
3	Florida	SEC	At-large	15-5-2
1	Florida State	ACC	At-large	16-4-1
	Illinois State	Missouri Valley	Automatic	12-6-1
	IUPUI	Summit	Automatic	17-4
4	LSU	SEC	At-large	14-4-4
	Memphis	Conference USA	Automatic	16-6
2	Notre Dame	Big East	Automatic	17-3-1
	Ohio State	Big Ten	At-large	14-3-2
	Oregon State	Pac-10	At-large	12-7-1
	Purdue	Big Ten	At-large	12-5-3
	Southeastern Louisiana	Southland	Automatic	13-4-2
	Texas A&M	Big 12	At-large	14-6-2

== Bracket ==
=== Stanford Bracket ===
First round November 12–13; Regional Campus Sites
1	Stanford	2
Northern Arizona	0
Maloney Field • Stanford, CA
BYU	2
UC Santa Barbara	0
Oklahoma State	0(5)
USC	0(4)
Buck Shaw Stadium • Santa Clara, CA
Michigan State	0
4	Santa Clara	1
3	UCF	3
Milwaukee	0
McClimon Complex • Madison, WI
Arizona State	1(3)
Wisconsin	1(4)
Boston University	0
Connecticut	1
Newton Soccer Complex • Newton, MA
Harvard	0
2	Boston College	1

Second round November 15; Regional Campus Sites
1	Stanford	2
BYU	0
Oklahoma State	1(4)
4	Santa Clara	1(5)
3	UCF	0
Wisconsin	1
Connecticut	0
2	Boston College	2

Round of 16; November 20–22; Campus Sites
1	Stanford*	1
4	Santa Clara	0
Wisconsin	0
2	Boston College*	1

Quarterfinals; November 27–28; Campus Sites
1	Stanford*	3
2	Boston College	1

=== UCLA Bracket ===
First round November 12–13; Regional Campus Sites
2	Portland	4
Denver	0
Merlo Field • Portland, OR
Washington	1
Ole Miss	0
Marquette	0(3)
Dayton	0(4)
Baujan Field • Dayton, OH
Murray State	0
3	Virginia Tech	2
4	Penn State	5
Colgate	0
Jeffrey Field • University Park, PA
Virginia	1(3)
St. John's (NY)	1(1)
San Diego State	1
San Diego	0
Drake Stadium • Los Angeles, CA
Boise State	1
1	UCLA	7

Second round November 15; Regional Campus Sites
2	Portland	2
Washington	1
Dayton	1
3	Virginia Tech	3
4	Penn State	2
Virginia	6
San Diego State	0
1	UCLA	5

Round of 16; November 20–22; Campus Sites
2	Portland*	4
3	Virginia Tech	1
Virginia	0
1	UCLA*	3

Quarterfinals; November 27–28; Campus Sites
2	Portland	1
1	UCLA*	2

=== North Carolina Bracket ===
First round November 12–13; Regional Campus Sites
1	North Carolina	1
High Point	0
Fetzer Field • Chapel Hill, NC
UNC Wilmington	0
Georgia	3
Washington State	1
Villanova	0
Ludwig Field • College Park, MD
Monmouth	0
4	Maryland	4
3	Wake Forest	2
Kennesaw State	0
Spry Stadium • Winston-Salem, NC
Loyola–Maryland	0
West Virginia	2
Rutgers	2
Duke	0
Stone Stadium • Columbia, SC
Davidson	0
2	South Carolina	4

Second round November 15; Regional Campus Sites
1	North Carolina	4
Georgia	0
Washington State	0
4	Maryland	1
3	Wake Forest	3
West Virginia	0
Rutgers	0
2	South Carolina	1

Round of 16; November 20–22; Campus Sites
1	North Carolina*	1
4	Maryland	0
3	Wake Forest	1
2	South Carolina*	0

Quarterfinals; November 27–28; Campus Sites
1	North Carolina*	5
3	Wake Forest	2

=== Florida State Bracket ===
First round November 12–13; Regional Campus Sites
2	Notre Dame	5
IUPUI	0
Alumni Field • Notre Dame, IN
Central Michigan	2
Purdue	0
Ohio State	1
Oregon State	3
Pressly Stadium • Gainesville, FL
Illinois State	0
3	Florida	2
4	LSU	7
Arkansas–Pine Bluff	0
LSU Soccer Stadium • Baton Rouge, LA
Memphis	1
Texas A&M	3
Auburn	1
California	2
Seminole Soccer Complex • Tallahassee, FL
Southeastern Louisiana	1
1	Florida State	4

Second round November 15; Regional Campus Sites
2	Notre Dame	6
Central Michigan	1
Oregon State	1
3	Florida	0
4	LSU	1(2)
Texas A&M	1(4)
California	0
1	Florida State	3

Round of 16; November 20–22; Campus Sites
2	Notre Dame*	1
Oregon State	0
Texas A&M	1
1	Florida State* (2OT)	2

Quarterfinals; November 27–28; Campus Sites
2	Notre Dame	2
1	Florida State*	0

=== College Cup ===
Semifinals; December 4 Aggie Soccer Complex; College Station, Texas
1	Stanford (2OT)	2
1	UCLA	1
1	North Carolina	1
2	Notre Dame	0

Championship; December 6 Aggie Soccer Complex; College Station, Texas
1	Stanford	0
1	North Carolina	1

== All-tournament team ==
- Casey Nogueira, North Carolina (most outstanding offensive player)
- Whitney Engen, North Carolina (most outstanding defensive player)
- Ashlyn Harris, North Carolina
- Tobin Heath, North Carolina
- Rachel Givan, North Carolina
- Jessica McDonald, North Carolina
- Lauren Cheney, UCLA
- Sydney Leroux, UCLA
- Kelley O'Hara, Stanford
- Christen Press, Stanford
- Lauren Fowlkes, Notre Dame

== See also ==
- NCAA Women's Soccer Championships (Division II, Division III)
- NCAA Men's Soccer Championships (Division I, Division II, Division III)
