= Jim Conlon =

American soccer coach

Current position
- Title: Head coach
- Team: Washington University
- Conference: UAA
- Record: 279–44–36

Playing career
- 1995–1998: Loras

Coaching career (HC unless noted)

Men's soccer
- 1998–1999: Loras (assistant)
- 2000–2007: Wartburg

Women's soccer
- 2000–2007: Wartburg
- 2008–2020: Washington University
- 2021: Grand Valley State
- 2022–present: Washington University

Head coaching record
- Overall: 399–102–42 (women's soccer); 108–48–10 (men's soccer)

Accomplishments and honors

Championships
- Women's soccer 3x NCAA DIII National (2016, 2024, 2025); NCAA DII National (2021); 12 UAA regular season (2008, 2009, 2012, 2013, 2015–2018, 2023–2025); GLIAC Regular season (2021)

Jim Conlon is an American former soccer player and the current head women's soccer coach at Washington University in St. Louis.

== Playing career ==
Conlon played soccer for Loras College and was a four-year varsity letter winner.

== Coaching career ==
=== Wartburg ===
In 2000, Conlon was named the first full-time soccer coach in Wartburg College history and coached both the men's and women's soccer teams. During his time coaching the men's team, he led them to 5 straight NCAA tournament appearances and posted a record of 108–48–10. On the women's side he led them to the 2007 IIAC title and to the schools first ever NCAA tournament berth. He was named IIAC Coach of the Year on two occasions in 2003 and 2004.

=== Washington University ===
On March 13, 2008, Conlon was named the head coach of the Washington University women's soccer team.

=== Grand Valley State ===
On July 30, 2021, Conlon was named the fourth head women's soccer coach at Grand Valley State University. In just one season with the Lakers he led them to a 24–1–2 record and won the NCAA Division II National Championship. After the 2021 season, Conlon stepped down as head coach.

=== Washington University ===
Following a one-year absence, Conlon returned to Washington University as head coach of the women's soccer program. He led them back to the NCAA title game just two years after his return and then won the programs 2nd national title in 2024, Conlan's 3rd of his career.

== Head coaching record ==
=== Women's soccer ===
Record table
Season	Team	Overall	Conference	Standing	Postseason
Wartburg Knights (Iowa Intercollegiate Athletic Conference) (2000–2008)
2000	Wartburg	4–13–1	1–7		
2001	Wartburg	13–5–1	4–5–1		
2002	Wartburg	12–7	6–3		
2003	Wartburg	8–11	3–5		
2004	Wartburg	16–3–1	6–1–1		
2005	Wartburg	14–6	7–1	2nd	
2006	Wartburg	11–8-1	5–3–1		
2007	Wartburg	18–4–1	7–1	2nd	NCAA Division III Sweet 16
Wartburg:		96–57–5 (.623)	39–25–3 (.604)		
Washington University Bears (University Athletic Association) (2008–2020)
2008	Washington University	15–4–2	6–1	1st	NCAA Division III Sweet 16
2009	Washington University	17–4–3	6–1–1	1st	NCAA Division III Runner-Up
2010	Washington University	11–8–2	3–2–2	4th	NCAA Division III Second Round
2011	Washington University	18–5	5–2	2nd	NCAA Division III Elite Eight
2012	Washington University	19–2–1	5–0–1	1st	NCAA Division III Elite Eight
2013	Washington University	20–1–1	7–0	1st	NCAA Division III Elite Eight
2014	Washington University	13–4–2	3–3–1	5th	NCAA Division III First Round
2015	Washington University	20–3–1	6–1	1st	NCAA Division III Runner-up
2016	Washington University	18–2–4	5–1–1	1st	NCAA Division III Champion
2017	Washington University	17–2–1	6–1	1st	NCAA Division III Sweet 16
2018	Washington University	21–1	7–1	1st	NCAA Division III Final Four
2019	Washington University	18–1–3	6–0–1	1st	NCAA Division III Sweet 16
2020	No team				Postseason not held; COVID-19
Grand Valley State Lakers (Great Lakes Intercollegiate Athletic Conference) (2021)
2021	Grand Valley State	24–1–2	12–0–2	2nd	NCAA Division II Champion
Grand Valley State:		24–1–2 (.926)	12–0–2 (.929)		
Washington University Bears (University Athletic Association) (2022–present)
2022	Washington University	11–5–7	2–4–1	6th	NCAA Division III Elite Eight
2023	Washington University	17–2–4	4–1–2	1st	NCAA Division III Runner-up
2024	Washington University	23–0–2	6–0–1	1st	NCAA Division III Champion
2025	Washington University	21–0–3	6–0–1	1st	NCAA Division III Champion
Washington University:		279–44–36 (.827)	89–18–12 (.798)		
Total:		399–102–42 (.773)			
National champion Postseason invitational champion Conference regular season champion Conference regular season and conference tournament champion Division regular season champion Division regular season and conference tournament champion Conference tournament champion

=== Men's soccer ===
Record table
Season	Team	Overall	Conference	Standing	Postseason
Wartburg Knights (Iowa Intercollegiate Athletic Conference) (2000–2008)
2000	Wartburg	2–12–1	1–7		
2001	Wartburg	9–10	3–5		
2002	Wartburg	11–9–1	3–5		
2003	Wartburg	14–4–2	6–2		NCAA Division III First Round
2004	Wartburg	20–2–2	7–0–1	1st	NCAA Division III Elite Eight
2005	Wartburg	18–4–1	7–1	1st	NCAA Division III Sweet 16
2006	Wartburg	19-3-1	7–1	1st	NCAA Division III Sweet 16
2007	Wartburg	15–4–2	7–1	2nd	NCAA Division III First Round
Wartburg:		108–48–10 (.681)	41–22–1 (.648)		
Total:		108–48–10 (.681)			
National champion Postseason invitational champion Conference regular season champion Conference regular season and conference tournament champion Division regular season champion Division regular season and conference tournament champion Conference tournament champion
