= Texas A&M Aggies women's soccer =

American college soccer team

- Founded: 1993; 33 years ago
- University: Texas A&M University
- Head coach: Bobby Shuttleworth (1st season)
- Conference: SEC
- Location: College Station, Texas, US
- Stadium: Ellis Field (capacity: 3,500)
- Nickname: Aggies
- Colors: Maroon and white
Home	Away

NCAA tournament College Cup
- 2014

NCAA tournament Quarterfinals
- 2001, 2002, 2006, 2008, 2014, 2015, 2020

NCAA tournament Round of 16
- 1998, 2000, 2001, 2002, 2003, 2004, 2005, 2006, 2008, 2009, 2012, 2013, 2014, 2015, 2018

NCAA tournament appearances
- 1995, 1996, 1997, 1998, 1999, 2000, 2001, 2002, 2003, 2004, 2005, 2006, 2007, 2008, 2009, 2010, 2011, 2012, 2013, 2014, 2015, 2016, 2017, 2018, 2019, 2020, 2022, 2023

Conference tournament championships
- 1997, 2001, 2004, 2005, 2011, 2013, 2014, 2017

Conference regular season championships
- 1997, 2002, 2004, 2005, 2006, 2007, 2010, 2013, 2014, 2020

The Texas A&M Aggies women's soccer team represents Texas A&M University in NCAA Division I college soccer. The team belongs to the Southeastern Conference (SEC) and plays its home games at Ellis Field.

== History ==
For the first 33 years of the program's existence, the Aggies were led by G Guerrieri, who was the head coach from the program's inception in 1993 until his retirement after the 2025 season. The Aggies have won 10 regular season championships, 7 in the Big 12 Conference, and an additional 3 since moving to the SEC starting during the 2012 season. Notably, the Aggies won four straight Big 12 regular season conference titles from 2004-07.

The 2014 team had 22 roster players, with 14 scholarships to utilize between them. The 2014 team finished first in the SEC in its third year as a member of the conference. The team advanced to its 20th consecutive NCAA Tournament, where they eventually lost to Virginia in the program's first appearance in the College Cup.

== Seasons ==
- Click on year for individual team pages (selected years only)

Year	Coach	Overall	Conference	Standing	Postseason	Final Rank
G. Guerrieri (Independent) (1993–1994)
1993	G. Guerrieri	15–3–1				
1994	G. Guerrieri	15–2–2				
G. Guerrieri (Southwest Conference) (1995)
1995	G. Guerrieri	18–6–0	3–1–0	2nd	NCAA 2nd Round	..13 – NSCAA
G. Guerrieri (Big 12 Conference) (1996–2011)
1996	G. Guerrieri	19–4–0	9–1–0	2nd	NCAA 1st Round	..07 – Soccer Buzz
1997	G. Guerrieri	18–3–0	9–1–0	1st	NCAA 1st Round	..10 – Soccer Buzz
1998	G. Guerrieri	14–8–0	7–2–0	3rd	NCAA 2nd Round	..24 – Soccer Buzz
1999	G. Guerrieri	17–5–1	7–3–0	2nd	NCAA Sweet 16	..08 – Soccer Buzz
2000	G. Guerrieri	18–7–0	8–2–0	2nd	NCAA Sweet 16	..12 – NSCAA
2001	G. Guerrieri	17–4–1	8–1–1	2nd	NCAA Elite 8	..07 – NSCAA
2002	G. Guerrieri	20–5–1	9–0–1	1st	NCAA Elite 8	..06 – NSCAA
2003	G. Guerrieri	13–6–3	5–3–2	5th	NCAA Sweet 16	..11 – NSCAA
2004	G. Guerrieri	18–6–0	8–2–0	1st	NCAA 2nd Round	..14 – Soccer Buzz
2005	G. Guerrieri	18–4–2	7–2–1	1st	NCAA Sweet 16	..10 – Soccer Buzz
2006	G. Guerrieri	17–6–1	9–1–0	1st	NCAA Elite 8	..05 – NSCAA
2007	G. Guerrieri	18–4–2	9–1–0	1st	NCAA 2nd Round	..12 – Soccer Buzz
2008	G. Guerrieri	18–5–1	7–2–1	2nd	NCAA Elite 8	..07 – NSCAA
2009	G. Guerrieri	15–7–3	6–2–2	2nd	NCAA Sweet 16	..13 – NSCAA
2010	G. Guerrieri	15–5–3	8–1–1	1st	NCAA 2nd Round	..16 – NSCAA
2011	G. Guerrieri	16–6–2	6–1–1	2nd	NCAA 2nd Round	..21 – NSCAA
G. Guerrieri (Southeastern Conference) (2012–2025)
2012	G. Guerrieri	19–5–1	10–2–1	2nd	NCAA Sweet 16	..15 – NSCAA
2013	G. Guerrieri	18–5–2	9–2–0	1st	NCAA Sweet 16	..08 – NSCAA
2014	G. Guerrieri	22–3–2	9–1–1	1st	NCAA College Cup	..04 – NSCAA
2015	G. Guerrieri	17–7–2	6–4–1	6th	NCAA Elite Eight	
2016	G. Guerrieri	12–8–2	5–5–1	T-6th	NCAA 2nd Round	
2017	G. Guerrieri	18–2–2	9–1–1	2nd	NCAA 2nd Round	
2018	G. Guerrieri	17-5-1	6-3-1	3rd	NCAA Sweet 16	13
2019	G. Guerrieri	15-5-3	7-2-1	3rd	NCAA 2nd Round	
2020	G. Guerrieri	12-4-1	7-1	T-1st	NCAA Elite Eight	5 - NSCAA
2021	G. Guerrieri	7-9-2	3-6-1	7th		
2022	G. Guerrieri	9-7-5	3-4-3	4th	NCAA 1st Round	
2023	G. Guerrieri	10-8-4	4-3-3	4th	NCAA 2nd Round	
2024	G. Guerrieri	8-9-2	3-5-2	T-10th		
2025	G. Guerrieri	5-7-5	2-6-2	13th		
G. Guerrieri:		493–175–53	201–69–28			
Bobby Shuttleworth (Southeastern Conference) (2026–present)
2026	Bobby Shuttleworth	5-11-1	1-8-1	15th		
Bobby Shuttleworth:		5–11–1	1–8–1			
Total:		498–186–54				
National champion Postseason invitational champion Conference regular season champion Conference regular season and conference tournament champion Division regular season champion Division regular season and conference tournament champion Conference tournament champion

== Individual Honors ==
=== All-Americans ===
- Highest achievement listed for each year

Pos	Player	Team	Year
F	Bryn Blalack	1st Team – NSCAA	1996
F	Bryn Blalack	1st Team – Soccer Buzz	1997
F	Diana Rowe	3rd Team – NSCAA	1996
F	Claire Elliot	3rd Team – NSCAA	1998
GK	Melanie Wilson	2nd Team – Soccer Buzz	1999
F	Nicky Thrasher	3rd Team – NSCAA	2001
F	Jessica Martin	2nd Team – Soccer Buzz	2002
F	Linsey Woodard	3rd Team – NSCAA	2002
GK	Kati Jo Spisak	2nd Team – Soccer Buzz	2002
GK	Kati Jo Spisak	3rd Team – NSCAA	2003
F	Ashlee Pistorious	3rd Team – Soccer Buzz	2004
F	Ashlee Pistorious	3rd Team – Soccer Buzz	2005
F	Ashlee Pistorious	2nd Team – NSCAA	2006
F	Ashlee Pistorious	1st Team – Soccer Buzz	2007
M	Amy Berend	4th Team – Soccer Buzz	2006
M	Amy Berend	3rd Team – Soccer Buzz	2007
D	Bri Young	3rd Team – Soccer Buzz	2008
D	Bri Young	4th Team – NSCAA	2010
M	Meghan Streight	3rd Team – NSCAA	2012
F	Ally Watt	1st Team – United Soccer Coaches	2018
F	Ally Watt	1st Team – United Soccer Coaches	2019
D	Jimena López	1st Team – United Soccer Coaches	2020
M	Addie McCain	2nd Team – United Soccer Coaches	2020
D	Karlina Sample	3rd Team – United Soccer Coaches	2020

=== Big 12 Honors ===
Year	Pos	Player	Class	Category
1996	F	Bryn Blalack	Jr.	Overall
1996	G	Melanie Wilson	Fr.	Freshman
1997	F	Bryn Blalack	Sr.	Overall
1997	D	Claire Elliott	Fr.	Freshman
2004	F	Ashlee Pistorius	Fr.	Freshman
2007	F	Ashlee Pistorious	Sr.	Offensive
2011	M/F	Kelley Monogue	Fr.	Offensive
2011	M/F	Kelley Monogue	Fr.	Freshman

=== SEC Honors ===
Year	Pos	Player	Class	Category
2014	F	Shea Groom	Sr.	Offensive
2019	F	Ally Watt	Sr.	Forward
2019	M	Jimena López	Jr.	Midfielder
2020	D	Jimena López	Sr.	Defender
2020	D	Karlina Sample	Jr.	Defender
2026	F	Ireland Churchill	Fr.	Freshman

=== Big 12 Coach of the Year ===
Year	Coach	School
1997	G. Guerrieri	Texas A&M
2002	G. Guerrieri	Texas A&M

=== SEC Coach of the Year ===
Year	Coach	School
2013	G. Guerrieri	Texas A&M
2014	G. Guerrieri	Texas A&M
2020	G. Guerrieri	Texas A&M

=== Honda Sports Award (Soccer) ===
Year	Pos	Player	Class	School
2007	F	Ashlee Pistorious	Sr.	Texas A&M

=== Lowe's Senior CLASS Award ===
Year	Pos	Player	Class	School
2009	D	Emily Peterson	Sr.	Texas A&M
