= D3hoops.com =

D3hoops.com is a website that covers men's and women's NCAA Division III college basketball. D3hoops.com is most noted for its Top 25 poll of Division III schools, featured on the website of the NCAA. The site is run by Patrick Coleman and has been featured in Sports Illustrated, ESPN Magazine, the Wall Street Journal, CSTV, and ESPN. The site has been online since 1997.

== History ==
D3hoops.com started as Division III Basketball Online in January 1995, when it was created by the Centennial Conference office and commissioner Steve Ulrich. Pat Coleman took over operation of the site in November 1997 and moved it to a server at Gallaudet University. The following February, the traffic to Division III Basketball Online overwhelmed Gallaudet's server, and Coleman was asked to remove the site. It took the domain www.d3hoops.com and was activated on Feb. 4, 1998.

When Coleman began a football site in the summer of 1999, named D3football.com, Division III Basketball Online was renamed D3hoops.com to match its partner site.
