= Allie Bailey =

American former soccer player

Personal information
- Full name: Alexandra Sylvia Bailey
- Date of birth: September 24, 1993 (age 33)
- Place of birth: San Diego, California
- Height: 5 ft 3 in (1.60 m)
- Position: Midfielder

College career
Years	Team	Apps	(Gls)
2011–2014	Texas A&M Aggies	101	(29)

Senior career*
Years	Team	Apps	(Gls)
2015	Houston Dash	7	(1)
- * Club domestic league appearances and goals as of May 23, 2017

Alexandra Sylvia Bailey (born September 24, 1993) is an American former soccer player who played as a midfielder for the Houston Dash in the National Women's Soccer League (NWSL).

== Playing career ==
=== Texas A&M Aggies, 2011–2014 ===
Bailey attended Texas A&M University, where she played for the Aggies from 2011 to 2014.

=== Houston Dash, 2015 ===
In 2015, Bailey played for expansion team Houston Dash as an amateur player called up while a number of international players were away from their professional clubs for the 2015 FIFA Women's World Cup. Bailey debuted on May 2, 2015, during a match against FC Kansas City. She scored her first goal for the club on May 31, 2015, a late equalizer during a match against Sky Blue FC, which was also the first NWSL goal scored by an amateur player. Bailey played in seven matches for the Dash. The team finished in fifth place during the regular season with a 6–8–6 record.
