= Meghan Lisenby =

American soccer player

Personal information
- Full name: Meghan Alexandra Lisenby
- Birth name: Meghan Alexandra Streight
- Date of birth: December 21, 1992 (age 33)
- Place of birth: McKinney, Texas, U.S.
- Height: 5 ft 5 in (1.65 m)
- Position: Defender

College career
Years	Team	Apps	(Gls)
2011–2014	Texas A&M Aggies		

Senior career*
Years	Team	Apps	(Gls)
2015	FC Kansas City	5	(0)
- * Club domestic league appearances and goals as of October 27, 2015

Meghan Alexandra Lisenby (née Streight; born December 21, 1992) is an American retired soccer player who most recently played for FC Kansas City.

== Club career ==
Lisenby was selected by FC Kansas City with the 16th overall pick in the 2015 NWSL College Draft. She was added to the roster as an amateur call-up on April 30, 2015. After winning the 2015 NWSL Championship with FCKC, Lisenby announced her retirement ahead of the 2016 season.

== Honors ==
FC Kansas City

Winner

- National Women's Soccer League: 2015
