= G Guerrieri =

American soccer coach (born 1963)

Personal information
- Full name: Gerald Guerrieri
- Date of birth: May 15, 1963 (age 63)
- Place of birth: Chicago, Illinois, U.S.
- Position: Goalkeeper

College career
Years	Team	Apps	(Gls)
1981–1984	Tulsa		

Managerial career
- 1988–1989: Hardin–Simmons
- 1993–2025: Texas A&M

Gerald Guerrieri (born May 15, 1963) is an American retired college soccer coach who served as the first head coach of the Texas A&M Aggies women's soccer team for 33 seasons.

== Early life ==
Guerrieri was born in Chicago, and was raised in Richardson, Texas, where he attended J. J. Pearce High School.

== Playing career ==
Guerrieri played college soccer at Tulsa from 1981 to 1984, where he set school records for most saves in a game and single-season shutouts. He was named to the All-Midwest Region First Team in 1981 and 1982.

He was inducted into the University of Tulsa Athletic Hall of Fame in 2024.

== Coaching career ==
In 1993, Guerrieri became head coach of Texas A&M Aggies women's soccer at the program's inception.

Guerrieri was named Big 12 Coach of the Year in 1997 and 2002, and was named SEC Coach of the Year in 2013, 2014, and 2020.

In January 2018, he was awarded the United Soccer Coaches Presidential Recognition Award.

On October 28, 2022, Guerrieri became the fifth NCAA Division I women's soccer coach to reach 500 career wins.

On September 8, 2024, Guerrieri recorded his 514th career win, surpassing Becky Burleigh for fourth-place in Division I career wins.

In January 2025, he was named the United Soccer Coaches Director of Women's College Services.

On October 28, 2025, it was announced that Guerrieri has retired.

== Personal life ==
He is married to Terri Markham; they have three children. Their son, Alan, played college football for Texas A&M.

Guerrieri is adopted, and met his birth mother for the first time as an adult.

== Honors ==
=== Player ===
Individual

- All-Midwest Region First Team: 1981, 1982

=== Coach ===
Texas A&M Aggies

- Big 12 Conference women's soccer tournament: 1997, 2001, 2004, 2005, 2011
- SEC women's soccer tournament: 2013, 2014, 2017

Individual

- Big 12 Coach of the Year: 1997, 2002
- SEC Coach of the Year: 2013, 2014, 2020

== See also ==
- List of college women's soccer career coaching wins leaders
