= Ellis Field (Texas A&M) =

College soccer stadium in Texas, U.S.

- Interactive map of Ellis Field
- Former names: Aggie Soccer Stadium
- Address: Olsen Blvd and Tom Chandler Rd; College Station, TX; United States
- Coordinates: 30°36′14.3″N 96°20′39.5″W
- Capacity: 3,500
- Type: Soccer-specific stadium
- Surface: Latitude 36 Bermuda Grass
- Record attendance: 8,204 (Aug. 25, 2006 vs. North Carolina)
- Field size: 105 x 69 m

Construction
- Built: 1994
- Opened: September 13, 1994; 31 years ago
- Renovated: 2005, 2011

Tenants
- Texas A&M Aggies women's soccer (1994-present)

Website
- 12thman.com/ellis-field

Ellis Field, formerly known as "Aggie Soccer Stadium" is a soccer-specific stadium located in College Station, Texas, United States on the campus of Texas A&M University. It has been home to the Texas A&M (women's) soccer team since 1994.

The stadium hosted the 2005, 2007, and 2009 NCAA Women's College Cup.

The stadium hosted the Houston Dynamo home matches in the 2007 CONCACAF Champions' Cup and 2011 U.S. Open Cup qualification.

A drainage system was installed prior to the 2002 campaign, and is capable of handling three inches of rain per hour.

The stadium completed a $1 million renovation in 2011 that includes seats added to the West stands of the stadium and "party decks" on the top of the East stands. Other additions include new restroom facilities on the West side and permanent stands added to the South side. In the future, a complete roof structure will be added to the stadium.

== Attendance Records ==
- (*) Annual Fish Camp game
- (^) Corps of Cadets game

#	Attend.	Opponent	Date	Score
1	8,204*	North Carolina	August 25, 2006	1–0
2	6,712*	Rhode Island	August 22, 2008	3–2
3	6,589*	Purdue	August 28, 2009	2–3
4	5,642*	North Carolina	August 29, 2008	2–3
5	5,634*	Central Florida	August 29, 2014	3–0
6	5,560*	Virginia Tech	August 27, 2010	5–3
7	5,552	Texas	October 12, 2007	3–1
8	5,447*	Stephen F. Austin	August 27, 2005	3–0
9	5,384	Texas	September 10, 2004	3–1
10	5,242*	Duke	August 23, 2013	0–1
11	5,008*	Dartmouth	August 31, 2007	2–0
12	4,970*	UTSA	August 25, 2012	2–0
13	4,887*	Dartmouth	September 2, 2011	3–0
14	4,673	East Carolina	September 9, 2005	3–0
15	4,593^	Arkansas	October 11, 2013	4–3
16	4,543	Baylor	October 28, 2005	4–0
17	4,403*	Michigan	August 27, 2004	2–1
18	4,385	Texas	October 30, 2009	4–0
19	4,316	Drake	October 14, 2011	6–1
20	4,287	Nebraska	October 13, 2006	2–0

== Yearly Average Attendance ==
Year	Avg.	Nat. #
1994	329	n/a
1995	438	n/a
1996	795	n/a
1997	1,157	n/a
1998	1,295	n/a
1999	1,728	4

Year	Avg.	Nat. #
2000	1,182	7
2001	1,575	3
2002	1,522	4
2003	1,977	2
2004	2,791	1

Year	Avg.	Nat. #
2005	3,363	2
2006	3,360	2
2007	3,148	2
2008	3,176	2
2009	3,211	2

Year	Avg.	Nat. #
2010	2,542	2
2011	2,630	3
2012	2,304	3
2013	2,281	3
2014	2,759	2

Events and tenants
Preceded by SAS Soccer Park; SAS Soccer Park; WakeMed Soccer Park	Host of the Women's College Cup; 2005; 2007; 2009	Succeeded by SAS Soccer Park; WakeMed Soccer Park; WakeMed Soccer Park
