= 2025 Boston College Eagles women's soccer team =

American college soccer season

2025 Boston College Eagles women's soccer
- Conference: Atlantic Coast Conference
- Record: 5–8–5 (1–7–2 ACC)
- Head coach: Chris Watkins (2nd season)
- Assistant coaches: Andrea Morrow (2nd season); Stephanie Demake (3rd season); Grace Barnard (1st season)
- Home stadium: Newton Campus Soccer Field

2025 ACC women's soccer standings
	Conf.						Overall
Team	W		L		T	PCT	W		L		T	PCT
No. 2 Stanford ‍†‍‡‍^{y}	9	–	0	–	1	.950	21	–	2	–	2	.880
No. 11 Notre Dame ‍‍‍^{y}	8	–	1	–	1	.850	15	–	2	–	3	.825
No. 3 Duke ‍‍‍^{y}	7	–	3	–	0	.700	17	–	5	–	1	.761
No. 1 Florida State ‍‍‍^{y}	6	–	2	–	2	.700	16	–	2	–	4	.818
No. 8 Virginia ‍‍‍^{y}	6	–	2	–	2	.700	14	–	3	–	5	.750
No. 24 Louisville ‍‍‍^{y}	6	–	2	–	2	.700	13	–	5	–	3	.690
No. 13т North Carolina ‍‍‍^{y}	6	–	4	–	0	.600	13	–	6	–	2	.667
California ‍‍‍	4	–	2	–	4	.600	8	–	3	–	8	.632
Wake Forest ‍‍‍^{y}	4	–	3	–	3	.550	11	–	5	–	4	.650
NC State ‍‍‍	4	–	4	–	2	.500	5	–	9	–	4	.389
Clemson ‍‍‍^{y}	4	–	4	–	2	.500	8	–	6	–	5	.553
SMU ‍‍‍	2	–	6	–	2	.300	8	–	8	–	2	.500
Pittsburgh ‍‍‍	2	–	8	–	0	.200	6	–	10	–	2	.389
Miami (FL) ‍‍‍	1	–	7	–	2	.200	7	–	8	–	3	.472
Boston College ‍‍‍	1	–	7	–	2	.200	5	–	8	–	5	.417
Syracuse ‍‍‍	1	–	8	–	1	.150	5	–	9	–	4	.389
Virginia Tech ‍‍‍	0	–	8	–	2	.100	4	–	10	–	4	.333
† – Conference champion ‡ – 2025 ACC Tournament champion y – Invited to the NCAA Tournament; As of December 9, 2025; Rankings from United Soccer Coaches Poll; Source: The ACC

The 2025 Boston College Eagles women's soccer team represented Boston College during the 2025 NCAA Division I women's soccer season. The Eagles were led by head coach Chris Watkins, in his second season. They played home games at Newton Campus Soccer Field in Chestnut Hill, Massachusetts. This was the team's 45th season playing organized women's college soccer, and their 21st playing in the Atlantic Coast Conference.

The Eagles started the season with wins against non-Power 4 foes before drawing at home to Cornell. They lost their next match, their first against Power 4 competition, 0–1 at Illinois. The Eagles would go 2–0–2 in their final four non-conference games, defeating Albany and Massachusetts, while drawing against Colgate and St. John's. They finished their non-conference schedule 4–1–3. They lost their opening match in conference play, before earning a 0–0 draw against sixteenth-ranked Wake Forest. They then took a trip to California where they lost to third-ranked Stanford and earned another 0–0 draw against California. They lost their next three ACC matches, including a road loss to nineteenth-ranked North Carolina 1–3. They won their first ACC match of the season on October 19, 1–0, at Syracuse. That would prove to be their only ACC win of the year as they lost to Clemson and at seventh-ranked Virginia.

The Eagles finished the season 5–8–5 overall and 1–7–2 in ACC play to finish in a tie for fourteenth place. They did not qualify for the ACC Tournament and were not invited to the NCAA Tournament. By not qualifying for the NCAA tournament, they extended their streak of not qualifying to seven straight seasons.

== Previous season ==
The Eagles finished the season 12–5–2 overall and 4–4–2 in ACC play to finish in tenth place. They did not qualify for the ACC Tournament and were not invited to the NCAA Tournament. Their twelve total wins were the most since 2018, a season prior to when Jason Lowe took over the program. Their four ACC wins were also the best since 2018. By not qualifying for the NCAA tournament, they extended their streak of not qualifying to six seasons.

== Offseason ==
=== Departures ===
Departures
Name	Number	Pos.	Height	Year	Hometown	Reason for departure
Wiebke Willebrandt	1	GK	6'0"	Senior	Lippstadt, Germany	Graduated
Jordan Teguis	2	DF	5'10"	Senior	North Smithfield, Rhode Island	Graduated
Sarai Costello	4	DF	5'7"	Senior	Canton, Massachusetts	Graduated
Aislin Streicek	5	FW	5'10"	Senior	West Vancouver, Canada	Graduated
Emily Sapienza	10	MF	5'8"	Graduate Student	Raleigh, North Carolina	Graduated
Ava Lung	11	FW	5'10"	Graduate Student	Westwood, Massachusetts	Graduated
Riley Prozzo	13	DF	5'8"	Freshman	Southington, Connecticut	Transferred to UConn
Shea Boyle	18	DF	5'9"	Freshman	Manchester, Connecticut	Transferred to Seton Hall
Andi Barth	21	FW	5'6"	Senior	Saint Paul, Minnesota	Graduated
Ella Richards	22	FW	5'9"	Senior	Chicago, Illinois	Graduated
Grace Courter	23	DF	5'11"	Senior	Bellevue, Washington	Graduated
Paige Peltier	24	FW	5'11"	Graduate Student	Hastings, Minnesota	Graduated
Maya Cheeseboro	34	GK	5'7"	Freshman	Bethesda, Maryland	Transferred to Maryland

=== Incoming transfers ===
Incoming transfers
Name	Number	Pos.	Height	Year	Hometown	Previous school
Sophie Reale	24	FW	5'5"	Junior	Hingham, Massachusetts	UCLA
Lydia Poulin	27	DF	5'7"	Sophomore	West Hartford, Connecticut	New Hampshire

=== Recruiting class ===
Name	Nationality	Hometown	Club	TDS Rating
Tess Barrett; MF	(United States)	Cohasset, Massachusetts	NEFC GA	3/5 stars
Emma Easterly; DF	(United States)	Lancaster, Massachusetts	FC Stars of Massachusetts	3/5 stars
Elsa Freeman; FW	(United States)	Portland, Maine	Seacoast United	3/5 stars
Ada Henschien; FW	(Norway)	Bergen, Norway	Tertnes Vidergående Skole	N/A
Lily Kiliski; MF	(United States)	Fresh Meadows, New York	New York SC	3/5 stars
Milla Lee; FW	(United States)	Dover, Massachusetts	FC Stars of Massachusetts	3/5 stars
Dylan Lochhead; MF	(United States)	Northborough, Massachusetts	Scorpions SC	3/5 stars
Alexandria Lofton; GK	(United States)	Columbus, Georgia	Concorde Fire SC	3/5 stars
Emily Mara; FW	(United States)	Andover, Massachusetts	FC Stars of Massachusetts	3/5 stars
Sadie Mathis; FW	(United States)	Acton, Massachusetts	FC Stars of Massachusetts	4/5 stars
Sohana Spencer; FW	(United States)	Houston, Texas	Albion Hurricanes FC	3/5 stars
Este Tejpaul; GK	(United States)	Greenwich, Connecticut	Connecticut FC	3/5 stars
Sienna Ward; FW	(United States)	Seattle, Washington	Crossfire Premier SC	3/5 stars
Anndi Wright; MF	(United States)	Kaysville, Utah	Wasatch SC	3/5 stars

== Squad ==
=== Roster ===
As of December 29, 2025

Note: Flags indicate national team as defined under FIFA eligibility rules; some limited exceptions apply. Players may hold more than one non-FIFA nationality.

No.	Pos.	Nation	Player
0	GK	USA	Alexandria Lofton
1	GK	USA	Olivia Shippee
2	MF	USA	Natalie Grosse
3	MF	USA	Delaney Van Pelt
4	FW	USA	Emily Mara
5	FW	USA	Milla Lee
6	DF	USA	Ava McNeil
7	MF	USA	Georgina Clarke
8	MF	USA	Bella Douglas
9	FW	USA	Sydney Segalla
10	MF	USA	Tess Barrett
11	FW	USA	Sadie Mathis
12	DF	USA	Amalia Dray
13	MF	USA	Lily Killski
14	FW	NOR	Ada Henschien

No.	Pos.	Nation	Player
15	MF	CAN	Ashley Roberts
16	MF	USA	Elly Slensky
17	FW	USA	Sohana Spencer
18	DF	USA	Sienna Ward
20	MF	USA	Baylor Goldthwaite
21	MF	USA	Anndi Wright
22	DF	USA	Dylan Lochhead
23	FW	USA	Elsa Freeman
24	FW	USA	Sophie Reale
25	MF	USA	Sophia Lowenberg
27	DF	USA	Lydia Poulin
32	GK	USA	Este Tejpaul
33	GK	CAN	Faith Fenwick
—	DF	USA	Emmy Easterly

=== Team management ===
Position	Staff
Head coach	Chris Watkins
Assistant Coach	Andrea Morrow
Assistant Coach	Stephanie Demake
Assistant Coach	Grace Barnard
Director of Operations	Molly Abbott

== Schedule ==
Date Time, TV	Rank^{#}	Opponent^{#}	Result	Record	Site (Attendance) City, State
Exhibition
August 5*; 4:00 p.m.		UMass Lowell	None reported	—	Newton Campus Soccer Field; Chestnut Hill, MA
August 10*; 6:30 p.m.		at Merrimack	None reported	—	Martone-Mejail Field; North Andover, MA
Non-conference regular season
August 14*; 7:00 p.m., ACCNX		Stonehill	W 4–1	1–0–0	Newton Campus Soccer Field (480); Chestnut Hill, MA
August 17*; 1:00 p.m., ACCNX		Fairleigh Dickinson	W 4–0	2–0–0	Newton Campus Soccer Field (350); Chestnut Hill, MA
August 22*; 5:00 p.m., ACCNX		Cornell	T 0–0	2–0–1	Newton Campus Soccer Field (935); Chestnut Hill, MA
August 25*; 7:00 p.m., BTN+		at Illinois	L 0–1	2–1–1	Demirjian Park (1,083); Urbana-Champaign, IL
August 31*; 4:00 p.m., ACCNX		Albany	W 6–1	3–1–1	Newton Campus Soccer Field (435); Chestnut Hill, MA
September 4*; 7:00 p.m., ACCNX		Colgate	T 0–0	3–1–2	Newton Campus Soccer Field (281); Chestnut Hill, MA
September 7*; 1:00 p.m., ESPN+		at Massachusetts	W 3–0	4–1–2	Rudd Field (456); Amherst, MA
September 14*; 3:00 p.m., ESPN+		at St. John's	T 0–0	4–1–3	Belson Stadium (409); Queens, NY
ACC regular season
September 18; 7:00 p.m., ACCNX		Pittsburgh	L 1–2	4–2–3 (0–1–0)	Newton Campus Soccer Field (457); Chestnut Hill, MA
September 21; 1:00 p.m., ACCNX		No. 16 Wake Forest	T 0–0	4–2–4 (0–1–1)	Newton Campus Soccer Field (675); Chestnut Hill, MA
September 25; 10:00 p.m., ACCNX		at No. 3 Stanford	L 0–2	4–3–4 (0–2–1)	Cagan Stadium (1,881); Stanford, CA
September 28; 4:00 p.m., ACCNX		at California	T 0–0	4–3–5 (0–2–2)	Edwards Stadium (563); Berkeley, CA
October 2; 7:00 p.m., ACCNX		No. 19 North Carolina	L 1–3	4–4–5 (0–3–2)	Dorrance Field (1,377); Chapel Hill, NC
October 9; 7:00 p.m., ACCNX		NC State	L 0–1	4–5–5 (0–4–2)	Newton Campus Soccer Field (350); Chestnut Hill, MA
October 12; 12:00 p.m., ACCNX		Louisville	L 0–1	4–6–5 (0–5–2)	Newton Campus Soccer Field (359); Chestnut Hill, MA
October 19; 12:00 p.m., ACCNX		at Syracuse	W 1–0	5–6–5 (1–5–2)	SU Soccer Stadium (544); Syracuse, NY
October 24; 3:00 p.m., ACCNX		Clemson	L 0–1	5–7–5 (1–6–2)	Newton Campus Soccer Field (310); Chestnut Hill, MA
October 30; 7:00 p.m., ACCNX		at No. 7 Virginia	L 0–2	5–8–5 (1–7–2)	Klöckner Stadium (471); Charlottesville, VA
*Non-conference game. ^{#}Rankings from United Soccer Coaches. (#) Tournament seedings in parentheses. All times are in Eastern.

== Rankings ==
Ranking movements Legend: — = Not ranked
	Week																
Poll	Pre	1	2	3	4	5	6	7	8	9	10	11	12	13	14	15	Final
United Soccer	—	—	—	—	—	—	—	—	—	—	—	—	—	Not released			—
TopDrawer Soccer	—	—	—	—	—	—	—	—	—	—	—	—	—	—	—	—	—
