= 2025 Virginia Tech Hokies women's soccer team =

American college soccer season

2025 Virginia Tech Hokies women's soccer
- Conference: Atlantic Coast Conference
- Record: 4–10–4 (0–8–2 ACC)
- Head coach: Charles Adair (15th season)
- Associate head coach: Drew Kopp (14th season)
- Assistant coach: Matt Gwilliam (11th season)
- Home stadium: Thompson Field

2025 ACC women's soccer standings
	Conf.						Overall
Team	W		L		T	PCT	W		L		T	PCT
No. 2 Stanford ‍†‍‡‍^{y}	9	–	0	–	1	.950	21	–	2	–	2	.880
No. 11 Notre Dame ‍‍‍^{y}	8	–	1	–	1	.850	15	–	2	–	3	.825
No. 3 Duke ‍‍‍^{y}	7	–	3	–	0	.700	17	–	5	–	1	.761
No. 1 Florida State ‍‍‍^{y}	6	–	2	–	2	.700	16	–	2	–	4	.818
No. 8 Virginia ‍‍‍^{y}	6	–	2	–	2	.700	14	–	3	–	5	.750
No. 24 Louisville ‍‍‍^{y}	6	–	2	–	2	.700	13	–	5	–	3	.690
No. 13т North Carolina ‍‍‍^{y}	6	–	4	–	0	.600	13	–	6	–	2	.667
California ‍‍‍	4	–	2	–	4	.600	8	–	3	–	8	.632
Wake Forest ‍‍‍^{y}	4	–	3	–	3	.550	11	–	5	–	4	.650
NC State ‍‍‍	4	–	4	–	2	.500	5	–	9	–	4	.389
Clemson ‍‍‍^{y}	4	–	4	–	2	.500	8	–	6	–	5	.553
SMU ‍‍‍	2	–	6	–	2	.300	8	–	8	–	2	.500
Pittsburgh ‍‍‍	2	–	8	–	0	.200	6	–	10	–	2	.389
Miami (FL) ‍‍‍	1	–	7	–	2	.200	7	–	8	–	3	.472
Boston College ‍‍‍	1	–	7	–	2	.200	5	–	8	–	5	.417
Syracuse ‍‍‍	1	–	8	–	1	.150	5	–	9	–	4	.389
Virginia Tech ‍‍‍	0	–	8	–	2	.100	4	–	10	–	4	.333
† – Conference champion ‡ – 2025 ACC Tournament champion y – Invited to the NCAA Tournament; As of December 9, 2025; Rankings from United Soccer Coaches Poll; Source: The ACC

The 2025 Virginia Tech Hokies women's soccer team represented Virginia Tech during the 2025 NCAA Division I women's soccer season. It was the 33rd season of the university fielding a program and 22nd competing in the Atlantic Coast Conference. The Hokies were led by fifteenth-year head coach Charles Adair and played their home games at Thompson Field in Blacksburg, Virginia.

The Hokies started the season ranked fourteenth and won their first two games. They fell to fifteenth in the rankings defeated Clemson in a non-ACC match before losing to Georgetown. This loss caused them to fall to twenty-fourth where they finished a three-game road trip with a win, loss, and a tie. They finished their non-conference season with a tie at home to William & Mary and were ranked tied for twentieth. Their non-conference record was 4–2–2. They began the ACC season unranked and lost their first three ACC games, two of which were against ranked opponents in number nineteen North Carolina and number sixteen Wake Forest. They broke the streak with a 4–4 tie against NC State at home, before going on a five-game losing streak. Four of those games were against ranked teams, including playing the top ranked team twice. They lost to top ranked Virginia in their rivalry match 1–2 and lost to then number one Notre Dame 0–5. They also lost to third-ranked Stanford and ninth-ranked Duke. They finished the ACC with a 0–0 tie against Miami (FL).

The Hokies finished 4–10–4 overall and 0–8–2 in ACC play to finish in seventeenth place. They did not qualify for the ACC Tournament, and they were not invited to the NCAA Tournament. Their four overall wins were the second lowest in program history, with their 3 wins in 1995 being the only season with fewer. They failed to win a conference game for the first time in program history.

== Previous season ==
The Hokies finished 14–6–3 overall and 6–2–2 in ACC play to finish in fifth place. As the fifth seed in the ACC Tournament, they lost to the fourth seed North Carolina in the First Round. They received an at-large invitation to the NCAA Tournament. In the tournament they were selected as the seventh seed in the Duke bracket. They defeated Tennessee in the First Round which earned them a trip to Los Angeles. There they defeated second seed and ninth ranked UCLA in the Second Round, and third seed and seventeenth ranked Iowa in the Round of 16. They traveled back east to face first seed and number one ranked Duke in the Quarterfinals. The Hokies run ended there as they lost to Duke 1–0. The appearance was only the second Quarterfinal in program history. Their fourteen overall wins and six ACC wins were the best since 2015.

== Offseason ==
=== Departures ===
Departures
Name	Number	Pos.	Height	Year	Hometown	Reason for departure
Mikki Easter	1	GK	5'9"	Graduate Student	Culpeper, Virginia	Graduated
Anio Vuorinen	5	MF/DF	5'4"	Senior	Espoo, Finland	Graduated
Avery Tharrington	7	MF	5'7"	Senior	Springfield, Virginia	Graduated
Emma Garrelts	8	MF/DF	5'6"	Sophomore	Park Ridge, Illinois	—
Courtney Anderson	9	MF	5'6"	Junior	Clifton, Virginia	—
Viv Pope	10	FW	5'6"	Freshman	Ashburn, Virginia	—
Amelie D'Angillo	11	DF	5'7"	Freshman	Silver Spring, Maryland	—
Victoria Moser	13	MF/DF	5'8"	Senior	Greensboro, North Carolina	Graduated
Allie Lewis	14	DF	5'9"	Senior	Bloomsburg, Pennsylvania	Graduated
Allie George	16	FW/DF	5'11"	Senior	Louisville, Kentucky	Graduated; signed professional contract with Racing Louisville FC
Ella Bjorklund	17	DF	5'6"	Sophomore	Wake Forest, North Carolina	—
Lauren Gogal	18	MF	5'10"	Senior	Haymarket, Virginia	Graduated
Sophie Maltese	22	FW	5'7"	Senior	Ashburn, Virginia	Graduated
Emma Pelkowski	26	MF	5'7"	Senior	West Chester, Pennsylvania	Graduated; signed professional contract with HB Køge
Eden Skyers	28	DF	5'6"	Senior	London, England	Graduated
Mallory Mizelle	30	GK	5'6"	Senior	Suffolk, Virginia	Graduated

=== Incoming transfers ===
Incoming transfers
Name	Number	Pos.	Height	Year	Hometown	Previous school
Eliana Salama	9	FW	5'3"	Senior	Pembroke Pines, Florida	SMU

=== Recruiting class ===
Name	Nationality	Hometown	Club	TDS Rating
Madison Boutot; DF	(Canada)	Saint-Constant, Canada	St. Hubert Soccer Club	3/5 stars
Syrianna Davis; FW	(United States)	Wake Forest, North Carolina	NCFC	3/5 stars
Christine Eiblmeier; DF	(Canada)	Ottawa, Canada	Eintracht Frankfurt U19	N/A
Anna Garrow; FW	(United States)	Roswell, Georgia	Tophat SC	3/5 stars
Peyton May; MF	(United States)	Wake Forest, North Carolina	North Carolina Courage ECNL	3/5 stars
Hannah Pachan; MF	(United States)	Uniontown, Ohio	Cleveland Force FC	3/5 stars
Lily Pantaleo; FW	(United States)	Shelby Township, Michigan	Nationals ECNL	3/5 stars
Ellie Robertson; DF	(United States)	Berkeley Heights, New Jersey	PDA ECNL	3/5 stars
Chase Rooney; GK	(United States)	Manassas, Virginia	Virginia Development Academy	3/5 stars
Letizia Rossi; MF	(Italy)	Monza, Italy	AC Milan	N/A
Julia Tepes; MF	(United States)	Medford, New Jersey	Real Futbol Academy	3/5 stars

== Squad ==
=== Roster ===
As of November 25, 2025

Note: Flags indicate national team as defined under FIFA eligibility rules; some limited exceptions apply. Players may hold more than one non-FIFA nationality.

No.	Pos.	Nation	Player
00	GK	USA	Lauren Hargrove
0	GK	USA	Savannah Sabo
1	GK	USA	Chase Rooney
2	DF	USA	Annie DeHaan
3	FW	USA	Anna Weir
4	MF	USA	Peyton May
5	MF	USA	Hannah Pachan
6	DF	CAN	Madi Boutot
7	MF	USA	Ellie Robertson
8	MF	USA	Gabby Ciocca
9	FW	USA	Eliana Salama
10	MF	ITA	Letizia Rossi
11	DF	CAN	Christine Eiblmeier
12	FW	USA	Lily Pantaleo
13	FW	USA	Kate Grannis

No.	Pos.	Nation	Player
14	MF	USA	Kendall DiMillio
16	FW	USA	Ella Valente
17	FW	USA	Anna Garrow
18	MF	USA	Syri Davis
19	FW	USA	Samantha DeGuzman
20	DF	USA	Kylie Marschall
21	FF	USA	Taylor Lewin
22	DF	USA	Ashleigh Vizek
24	FW	USA	Natalie Mitchell
25	FW	USA	Taylor Price
26	FW	USA	Lauren Carpenter
28	DF	USA	Julia Tepes
31	DF	USA	Maysen Nelson
33	MF	USA	Ava Arengo
37	FW	USA	Sarah Rosenbaum

== Team management ==
Position	Staff
Head coach	Charles Adair
Associate Head Coach	Drew Kopp
Assistant Coach	Matt Gwilliam
Director of Operations	Katie Flores

== Schedule ==
Date Time, TV	Rank^{#}	Opponent^{#}	Result	Record	Site (Attendance) City, State
Exhibition
August 3*; 5:00 p.m.	No. 14	at UNC Greensboro	None Reported	—	UNCG Soccer Stadium; Greensboro, NC
August 9*; 1:00 p.m.	No. 14	vs. No. 17 Vanderbilt	None Reported		MC Soccer Complex; Maryville, TN
Non-conference regular season
August 14*; 7:00 p.m., ESPN+	No. 14	at High Point	W 2–0	1–0–0	Vert Stadium (414); High Point, NC
August 17*; 5:00 p.m., ACCNX	No. 14	VCU	W 5–1	2–0–0	Thompson Field (764); Blacksburg, VA
August 21*; 8:30 p.m., ACCNX	No. 15	Clemson	W 4–0	3–0–0	Thompson Field (1,047); Blacksburg, VA
August 24*; 5:30 p.m., ACCNX	No. 15	Georgetown	L 1–2	3–1–0	Thompson Field (1,135); Blacksburg, VA
August 28*; 6:00 p.m., ESPN+	No. 24	at Liberty	T 1–1	3–1–1	Osborne Stadium (521); Lynchburg, VA
August 31*; 6:00 p.m., FloCollege	No. 24	at Campbell	W 5–1	4–1–1	Eakes Athletics Complex (231); Buies Creek, NC
September 4*; 6:00 p.m., ESPN+	No. 20т	at Old Dominion	L 1–2	4–2–1	Old Dominion Soccer Complex (750); Norfolk, VA
September 7*; 6:00 p.m., ACCNX	No. 20т	William & Mary	T 3–3	4–2–2	Thompson Field (824); Blacksburg, VA
ACC regular season
September 11; 7:00 p.m., ACCNX		No. 19 North Carolina	L 1–2	4–3–2 (0–1–0)	Thompson Field (1,024); Blacksburg, VA
September 14; 1:00 p.m., ACCNX		at Louisville	L 0–1	4–4–2 (0–2–0)	Lynn Stadium (200); Louisville, KY
September 18; 7:00 p.m., ACCNX		at No. 16 Wake Forest	L 1–2	4–5–2 (0–3–0)	Spry Stadium (773); Winston-Salem, NC
September 27; 7:00 p.m., ACCNX		NC State	T 4–4	4–5–3 (0–3–1)	Thompson Field (121); Blacksburg, VA
October 4; 7:00 p.m., ACCNX		at No. 1 Virginia; Rivalry	L 1–2	4–6–3 (0–4–1)	Klöckner Stadium (3,611); Charlottesville, VA
October 9; 10:00 p.m., ACCNX		at No. 3 Stanford	L 0–5	4–7–3 (0–5–1)	Cagan Stadium (1,412); Stanford, CA
October 12; 4:00 p.m., ACCNX		at California	L 0–1	4–8–3 (0–6–1)	Edwards Stadium (372); Berkeley, CA
October 18; 7:00 p.m., ACCNX		No. 9 Duke	L 2–3	4–9–3 (0–7–1)	Thompson Field (1,198); Blacksburg, VA
October 23; 8:00 p.m., ACCN		No. 1 Notre Dame	L 0–5	4–10–3 (0–8–1)	Thompson Field (426); Blacksburg, VA
October 30; 7:00 p.m., ACCNX		Miami (FL)	T 0–0	4–10–4 (0–8–2)	Thompson Field (243); Blacksburg, VA
*Non-conference game. ^{#}Rankings from United Soccer Coaches. (#) Tournament seedings in parentheses. All times are in Eastern.

== Awards and honors ==
Recipient	Award	Date	Ref.
Natalie Mitchell	Top Drawer Soccer Preseason Best XI Third Team	August 12	

== Rankings ==
Ranking movements Legend: ██ Increase in ranking ██ Decrease in ranking — = Not ranked RV = Received votes
	Week																
Poll	Pre	1	2	3	4	5	6	7	8	9	10	11	12	13	14	15	Final
United Soccer	14	15	24	20	RV	—	—	—	—	—	—	—	—	Not released			—
TopDrawer Soccer	10	9	24	—	—	—	—	—	—	—	—	—	—	—	—	—	—
