= 2025 Virginia Cavaliers women's soccer team =

American college soccer season

2025 Virginia Cavaliers women's soccer

NCAA Tournament, Round of 16
- Conference: Atlantic Coast Conference
- U. Soc. Coaches poll: No. 8
- TopDrawerSoccer.com: No. 10
- Record: 14–3–5 (6–2–2 ACC)
- Head coach: Steve Swanson (26th season)
- Associate head coach: Ron Raab (20th season)
- Assistant coaches: Sam Raper (4th season); Lizzy Sieracki (2nd season)
- Home stadium: Klöckner Stadium

2025 ACC women's soccer standings
	Conf.						Overall
Team	W		L		T	PCT	W		L		T	PCT
No. 2 Stanford ‍†‍‡‍^{y}	9	–	0	–	1	.950	21	–	2	–	2	.880
No. 11 Notre Dame ‍‍‍^{y}	8	–	1	–	1	.850	15	–	2	–	3	.825
No. 3 Duke ‍‍‍^{y}	7	–	3	–	0	.700	17	–	5	–	1	.761
No. 1 Florida State ‍‍‍^{y}	6	–	2	–	2	.700	16	–	2	–	4	.818
No. 8 Virginia ‍‍‍^{y}	6	–	2	–	2	.700	14	–	3	–	5	.750
No. 24 Louisville ‍‍‍^{y}	6	–	2	–	2	.700	13	–	5	–	3	.690
No. 13т North Carolina ‍‍‍^{y}	6	–	4	–	0	.600	13	–	6	–	2	.667
California ‍‍‍	4	–	2	–	4	.600	8	–	3	–	8	.632
Wake Forest ‍‍‍^{y}	4	–	3	–	3	.550	11	–	5	–	4	.650
NC State ‍‍‍	4	–	4	–	2	.500	5	–	9	–	4	.389
Clemson ‍‍‍^{y}	4	–	4	–	2	.500	8	–	6	–	5	.553
SMU ‍‍‍	2	–	6	–	2	.300	8	–	8	–	2	.500
Pittsburgh ‍‍‍	2	–	8	–	0	.200	6	–	10	–	2	.389
Miami (FL) ‍‍‍	1	–	7	–	2	.200	7	–	8	–	3	.472
Boston College ‍‍‍	1	–	7	–	2	.200	5	–	8	–	5	.417
Syracuse ‍‍‍	1	–	8	–	1	.150	5	–	9	–	4	.389
Virginia Tech ‍‍‍	0	–	8	–	2	.100	4	–	10	–	4	.333
† – Conference champion ‡ – 2025 ACC Tournament champion y – Invited to the NCAA Tournament; As of December 9, 2025; Rankings from United Soccer Coaches Poll; Source: The ACC

The 2025 Virginia Cavaliers women's soccer team represented the University of Virginia during the 2025 NCAA Division I women's soccer season. The Cavaliers were led by head coach Steve Swanson, in his twenty-sixth season. They played home games at Klöckner Stadium in Charlottesville, Virginia. This was the team's 40th season playing organized women's college soccer and their 38th playing in the Atlantic Coast Conference.

The Cavaliers began the season ranked fifteenth in the United Soccer Coaches poll and won their first four games. They did not allow a goal during that stretch and ascended to tied for thirteenth in the rankings before facing 16th ranked Georgetown. The match ended in a 1–1 draw, but Virginia rose to eighth in the rankings before facing 9th ranked Penn State. The Cavaliers won that match 1–0 and rose to fifth for their opening ACC match against 2nd ranked Duke. Virginia won that match 3–1 and advanced to the top of the rankings. While ranked first, they defeated Syracuse and Clemson, both 3–0. They also earned a 2–1 rivalry match win over Virginia Tech. A road trip to California saw them draw California 2–2 and lose to 3rd ranked Stanford 1–2. This saw Virginia fall off the top spot and to third in the rankings. There they drew at Louisville, lost to 11th ranked Florida State and defeated Pittsburgh. They fell to seventh in the rankings where they defeated Boston College to end the ACC regular season.

The Cavaliers finished the season 14–3–5 overall and 6–2–2 in ACC play to finish in a three-way tie for fourth place. They were the fifth seed in the ACC Tournament. They advanced over fourth seed and 6th ranked Florida State, in a penalty shoot-out to avenge their regular season loss. They lost to top seed and 1st ranked Stanford in the Semifinals. They received an at-large invitation to the NCAA Tournament, where they were the top seed in the Virginia Bracket. They defeated High Point in the First Round and defeated eighth seed Penn State in a regular season rematch in the Second Round. They fell in a penalty shoot-out to fourth seed and 13th ranked Washington in the Round of 16 to end their season.

== Previous season ==
The Cavaliers finished the season 13–5–1 overall and 5–5–0 in ACC play to finish in ninth place. They did not qualify for the ACC Tournament. This was the second consecutive season they did not qualify for the ACC tournament. They received an at-large invitation to the NCAA Tournament, where they were the fourth seed in the Southern California Bracket. They defeated Princeton in the First Round before falling to fifth-seed Wisconsin in the Second Round.

== Offseason ==
=== Departures ===
Departures
Name	Number	Pos.	Height	Year	Hometown	Reason for departure
Alexis Theoret	3	MF	5'4"	Graduate Student	Haymarket, Virginia	Graduated; signed professional contract with DC Power FC
Degen Miller	6	FW	5'9"	Senior	Boulder, Colorado	Graduated
Yuna McCormack	7	MF	5'9"	Sophomore	Mill Valley, California	Transferred to Florida State
Helen Symbas	13	DF	5'3"	Junior	Atlanta, Georgia	—
Emma Dawson	14	MF	5'8"	Graduate Student	Richardson, Texas	Graduated
Samar Guidry	18	DF	5'5"	Senior	McKinney, Texas	Graduated; signed professional contract with Dallas Trinity FC
Moira Kelley	20	DF	5'9"	Graduate Student	Overland Park, Kansas	Graduated; signed professional contract with Portland Thorns FC
Chloe Japic	21	MF/DF	5'6"	Graduate Student	Palo Alto, California	Graduated
Camryn Miller	29	GK	5'9"	Senior	Glen Allen, Virginia	Graduated; transferred to Cincinnati

=== Recruiting class ===
Name	Nationality	Hometown	Club	TDS Rating
Molly Carlson; GK	(United States)	Charlottesville, Virginia	Charlotte Soccer Academy	3/5 stars
Pearl Cecil; MF	(United States)	Encinitas, California	San Diego Surf	4/5 stars
Wicki Dunlap; GK	(United States)	Raleigh, North Carolina	North Carolina Courage	4/5 stars
Addison Halpern; MF	(United States)	Middlesex, New Jersey	PDA	4/5 stars
Jordyn Hardeman; DF	(United States)	Midlothian, Texas	Solar Soccer Club	4/5 stars
Carrie Helfrich; FW	(United States)	McLean, Virginia	Fairfax Virginia Union	4/5 stars
Marin McCormack; FW	(United States)	Arlington, Virginia	Fairfax Virginia Union	3/5 stars
Helen Olszewski; FW	(United States)	Oklahoma City, Oklahoma	Oklahoma Energy FC	3/5 stars
Loretta Talbott; MF	(United States)	Chevy Chase, Maryland	Fairfax Virginia Union	4/5 stars
Liv Rademaker; DF	(Netherlands)	Amsterdam, Netherlands	Ajax	N/A

== Squad ==
=== Roster ===
As of February 4, 2026

Note: Flags indicate national team as defined under FIFA eligibility rules; some limited exceptions apply. Players may hold more than one non-FIFA nationality.

No.	Pos.	Nation	Player
1	GK	USA	Victoria Safradin
2	MF	USA	Kira Waller
3	FW	USA	Sophia Bradley
4	DF	USA	Kiki Maki
5	MF	USA	Laughlin Ryan
6	FW	USA	Addison Halpern
7	MF	USA	Marin McCormack
8	FW	USA	Allie Ross
9	FW	USA	Meredith McDermott
10	FW	USA	Maggie Cagle
11	FW	AUT	Linda Mittermair
12	DF	USA	Aniyah Collier
13	FW	USA	Loretta Talbott
14	DF	USA	Jordyn Hardeman
15	FW	USA	Sarah Flammia

No.	Pos.	Nation	Player
16	MF	USA	Ella Carter
17	DF	USA	Tatum Galvin
18	DF	NED	Liv Rademaker
19	MF	USA	Jill Flammia
20	FW	USA	Carrie Helfrich
21	FW	USA	Helen Olszewski
22	MF	USA	Lia Godfrey
23	DF	USA	Laney Rouse
24	DF	USA	Kathryn Kelly
25	MF	USA	Annamarie Williams
26	FW	USA	Maya Carter
27	MF	USA	Pearl Cecil
29	GK	USA	Molly Carlson
30	GK	USA	Wicki Dunlap
33	GK	USA	Ellie Sommers

=== Team management ===
Position	Staff
Athletic Director	Carla Williams
Head coach	Steve Swanson
Associate head coach	Ron Raab
Assistant Coach	Sam Raper
Assistant Coach	Lizzy Sieracki
Director of Operations	Eilidh Thomson

== Schedule ==
Date Time, TV	Rank^{#}	Opponent^{#}	Result	Record	Site (Attendance) City, State
Exhibition
August 6*; 7:00 p.m.	No. 15	at No. 10 Wake Forest	None Reported	–	Spry Stadium; Winston-Salem, NC
August 9*; 8:00 p.m.	No. 15	DC Power FC	None Reported	–	Klöckner Stadium; Charlottesville, VA
Non-conference Regular season
August 14*; 7:00 p.m., ESPN+	No. 15	at West Virginia	W 1–0	1–0–0	Dick Dlesk Soccer Stadium (1,106); Morgantown, WV
August 21*; 5:30 p.m., ACCNX	No. 17	Xavier	W 3–0	2–0–0	Klöckner Stadium (0); Charlottesville, VA
August 24*; 1:00 p.m., ESPN+	No. 17	at Liberty	W 2–0	3–0–0	Osborne Stadium (652); Lynchburg, VA
August 28*; 7:00 p.m., ACCNX	No. 13т	Charlotte	W 3–0	4–0–0	Klöckner Stadium (571); Charlottesville, VA
August 31*; 1:00 p.m., ACCNX	No. 13т	No. 16 Georgetown	T 1–1	4–0–1	Klöckner Stadium (1,168); Charlottesville, VA
September 4*; 6:00 p.m., ACCN	No. 8	No. 9 Penn State	W 1–0	5–0–1	Klöckner Stadium (603); Charlottesville, VA
ACC Regular season
September 11; 7:00 p.m., ACCNX	No. 5	No. 2 Duke	W 3–1	6–0–1 (1–0–0)	Klöckner Stadium (1,857); Charlottesville, VA
September 14*; 5:00 p.m., ACCNX	No. 5	VCU	W 3–0	7–0–1	Klöckner Stadium (1,092); Charlottesville, VA
September 20; 7:00 p.m., ACCNX	No. 1	at Syracuse	W 3–0	8–0–1 (2–0–0)	SU Soccer Stadium (1,244); Syracuse, NY
September 25; 7:00 p.m., ACCNX	No. 1	at Clemson	W 3–0	9–0–1 (3–0–0)	Riggs Field (297); Clemson, SC
October 4; 7:00 p.m., ACCNX	No. 1	Virginia Tech; Rivalry	W 2–1	10–0–1 (4–0–0)	Klöckner Stadium (3,611); Charlottesville, VA
October 9; 6:30 p.m., ACCNX	No. 1	at California	T 2–2	10–0–2 (4–0–1)	Edwards Stadium (108); Berkeley, CA
October 12; 4:00 p.m., ACCNX	No. 1	at No. 3 Stanford	L 1–2	10–1–2 (4–1–1)	Cagan Stadium (1,800); Stanford, CA
October 18; 5:00 p.m., ACCNX	No. 3	at Louisville	T 1–1	10–1–3 (4–1–2)	Lynn Stadium (550); Louisville, KY
October 23; 6:00 p.m., ACCN	No. 3	No. 11 Florida State	L 2–3	10–2–3 (4–2–2)	Klöckner Stadium (1,712); Charlottesville, VA
October 26; 2:00 p.m., ACCNX	No. 3	Pittsburgh	W 2–0	11–2–3 (5–2–2)	Klöckner Stadium (N/A); Charlottesville, VA
October 30; 7:00 p.m., ACCNX	No. 7	Boston College	W 2–0	12–2–3 (6–2–2)	Klöckner Stadium (471); Charlottesville, VA
ACC Tournament
November 2*; 8:00 p.m., ACCN	(5) No. 7	at (4) No. 6 Florida State; First Round	T 0–0 (6–5 PKs)	12–2–4	Seminole Soccer Complex (1,072); Tallahassee, FL
November 6*; 8:00 p.m., ACCN	(5) No. 7	vs. (1) No. 1 Stanford; Semifinals	L 2–3	12–3–4	WakeMed Soccer Park (1,077); Cary, NC
NCAA Tournament
November 14*; 7:00 p.m., ESPN+	(1) No. 7	High Point; First Round	W 5–0	13–3–4	Klöckner Stadium (1,212); Charlottesville, VA
November 20*; 6:00 p.m., ESPN+	(1) No. 7	(8) Penn State; Second Round	W 2–0	14–3–4	Klöckner Stadium (1,107); Charlottesville, VA
November 23*; 2:00 p.m., ESPN+	(1) No. 7	(4) No. 13 Washington; Round of 16	T 1–1 (4–5 PKs) ^{2OT}	14–3–5	Klöckner Stadium (1,610); Charlottesville, VA
*Non-conference game. ^{#}Rankings from United Soccer Coaches. (#) Tournament seedings in parentheses. All times are in Eastern.

== Awards and honors ==
Recipient	Award	Date	Ref.
Maggie Cagle	Pre-season All-ACC Team	August 7	
Jordyn Hardeman	Top Drawer Soccer Preseason Best XI Freshman Team	August 12	
Victoria Safradin	ACC Defensive Player of the Week – Week 2	August 26	
Ella Carter	ACC Offensive Player of the Week – Week 5	September 16	
Lia Godfrey	ACC Midfielder of the Year	November 5	
Lia Godfrey	All-ACC First Team	November 5	
Maggie Cagle	All-ACC Second Team	November 5	
Laney Rouse	All-ACC Second Team	November 5	
Victoria Safradin	All-ACC Second Team	November 5	
Addison Halpern	ACC All-Freshman Team	November 5	
Liv Rademaker	ACC All-Freshman Team	November 5	
Meredith McDermott	All-ACC Tournament Team	November 9	
Victoria Safradin	All-ACC Tournament Team	November 9	

== Rankings ==
Ranking movements Legend: ██ Increase in ranking ██ Decrease in ranking — = Not ranked ( ) = First-place votes
	Week																
Poll	Pre	1	2	3	4	5	6	7	8	9	10	11	12	13	14	15	Final
United Soccer	15	17	13	8	5	1 (7)	1 (8)	1 (8)	1 (8)	3	3	7	7	Not released			8
TopDrawer Soccer	—	24	21	13	7	3	2	2	2	3	6	8	7	8	8	10	10
