= 2025 California Golden Bears women's soccer team =

American college soccer season

2025 California Golden Bears women's soccer
- Conference: Atlantic Coast Conference
- Record: 8–3–8 (4–2–4 ACC)
- Head coach: Neil McGuire (19th season)
- Associate head coach: Cori Callahan (15th season)
- Assistant coach: Alec Sundly (2nd season)
- Home stadium: Edwards Stadium

2025 ACC women's soccer standings
	Conf.						Overall
Team	W		L		T	PCT	W		L		T	PCT
No. 2 Stanford ‍†‍‡‍^{y}	9	–	0	–	1	.950	21	–	2	–	2	.880
No. 11 Notre Dame ‍‍‍^{y}	8	–	1	–	1	.850	15	–	2	–	3	.825
No. 3 Duke ‍‍‍^{y}	7	–	3	–	0	.700	17	–	5	–	1	.761
No. 1 Florida State ‍‍‍^{y}	6	–	2	–	2	.700	16	–	2	–	4	.818
No. 8 Virginia ‍‍‍^{y}	6	–	2	–	2	.700	14	–	3	–	5	.750
No. 24 Louisville ‍‍‍^{y}	6	–	2	–	2	.700	13	–	5	–	3	.690
No. 13т North Carolina ‍‍‍^{y}	6	–	4	–	0	.600	13	–	6	–	2	.667
California ‍‍‍	4	–	2	–	4	.600	8	–	3	–	8	.632
Wake Forest ‍‍‍^{y}	4	–	3	–	3	.550	11	–	5	–	4	.650
NC State ‍‍‍	4	–	4	–	2	.500	5	–	9	–	4	.389
Clemson ‍‍‍^{y}	4	–	4	–	2	.500	8	–	6	–	5	.553
SMU ‍‍‍	2	–	6	–	2	.300	8	–	8	–	2	.500
Pittsburgh ‍‍‍	2	–	8	–	0	.200	6	–	10	–	2	.389
Miami (FL) ‍‍‍	1	–	7	–	2	.200	7	–	8	–	3	.472
Boston College ‍‍‍	1	–	7	–	2	.200	5	–	8	–	5	.417
Syracuse ‍‍‍	1	–	8	–	1	.150	5	–	9	–	4	.389
Virginia Tech ‍‍‍	0	–	8	–	2	.100	4	–	10	–	4	.333
† – Conference champion ‡ – 2025 ACC Tournament champion y – Invited to the NCAA Tournament; As of December 9, 2025; Rankings from United Soccer Coaches Poll; Source: The ACC

The 2025 California Golden Bears women's soccer team represented the University of California, Berkeley during the 2025 NCAA Division I women's soccer season. The Golden Bears were led by head coach Neil McGuire, in his nineteenth season. They played home games at Edwards Stadium in Berkeley, California. This was the team's 43rd season playing organized women's college soccer and their 2nd playing in the Atlantic Coast Conference.

The Golden Bears started the season 2–1–1 in their first four games. Their two victories both were 3–2 over UC San Diego and San Francisco. They drew with Cal State Fullerton and lost to Pepperdine. The loss to Pepperdine would be their only non-conference loss of the season. They finished their non-conference slate going 2–0–3 over their other five games. They played only one Power 4 team in that span, defeating Arizona. They also defeated Santa Clara. They started their ACC season with a trip to the east coast where they defeated Pittsburgh and drew with Clemson. They went 1–1–2 over their next four games, defeating Syracuse, losing to SMU, and drawing Boston College and top ranked Virginia. They improved their form to finish ACC play, going 2–1–1. THeir loss came in their rivalry match with Stanford, who was the top ranked team at the time. They also drew seventh-ranked Florida State in Tallahssee.

The Golden Bears finished the season 8–3–8 overall and 4–3–4 in ACC play to finish in eighth place. They did not qualify for the ACC Tournament and were not invited to the NCAA Tournament.

== Previous season ==
The Golden Bears finished the season 13–6–2 overall and 5–4–1 in ACC play to finish in a tie for seventh place. They did not qualify for the ACC Tournament. They received an at-large bid to the NCAA Tournament and were unseeded in the Mississippi State Bracket. They defeated seventh seed Pepperdine in the First Round, before falling to second seed Arkansas 1–0 in the Second Round.

== Offseason ==
=== Departures ===
Departures
Name	Number	Pos.	Height	Year	Hometown	Reason for departure
Kelly McManus	00	GK	5'11"	Graduate Student	Long Beach, California	Graduated
Aasha McLyn	2	DF	5'4"	(redshirt) Junior	Long Beach, California	Graduated
Mya Daily	3	MF/DF	5'7"	Graduate Student	Moreno Valley, California	Graduated
Alexis Wright	8	FW	5'6"	Senior	Atlanta, Georgia	Graduated
Ari Manrique	9	FW	5'6"	Senior	Buford, Georgia	Graduated
Karlie Lema	12	FW	5'10"	Senior	Morgan Hill, California	Graduated; Signed professional contract with Bay FC
Cailin Bloom	15	DF	5'10"	Senior	Dixon, California	Graduated
Courtney Boone	19	DF	5'6"	Senior	West Covina, California	Graduated, transferred to Oregon
Kei Kitamura	20	MF	5'5"	Senior	San Jose, California	Graduated
Jordyn Young	21	FW/MF	5'9"	Senior	Martinez, California	Graduated
Julia Leontini	22	MF	5'7"	Graduate Student	Danville, California	Graduated
Skylar Briggs	29	DF/MF	5'4"	Graduate Student	Torrance, California	Graduated
Aaliyah Schinaman	30	FW	5'5"	Senior	San Mateo, California	Graduated, transferred to George Mason
Emily Moberly	42	MF	5'7"	Senior	Windsor, California	Graduated

=== Incoming transfers ===
Incoming transfers
Name	Number	Pos.	Height	Year	Hometown	Previous school
Lumi Kostmayer	19	FW	5'11"	Senior	Southbury, Connecticut	Stanford
Emelia Warta	34	MF	5'5"	Junior	Vancouver, Washington	Vanderbilt

=== Recruiting class ===
Name	Nationality	Hometown	Club	TDS Rating
Cara Borthwick; MF	(Scotland)	Edinburgh, Scotland	Boroughmuir Thistle FC	N/A
Morgan Farnham; GK	(United States)	Los Angeles, California	Beach FC	4/5 stars
Amelie Hoppe; FW	(Germany)	Brodersdorf, Germany	Turbine Potsdam	N/A
Emily Humphrey; DF	(New Zealand)	Wellington, New Zealand	Wellington Phoenix (Reserves)	N/A
Elhom Khursand; MF	(United States)	El Dorado Hills, California	San Juan SC	4/5 stars
Elle Kivo; DF	(United States)	Irvine, California	Slammers FC HB Koge	3/5 stars
Hope Luebbe Davidson; DF	(United States)	Seattle, Washington	Seattle United	3/5 stars
Olivia McPherson; DF	(United States)	El Segundo, California	Slammers FC HB Koge	3/5 stars
Journey Middleborn; MF	(United States)	San Marcos, California	San Diego Surf	3/5 stars
Gianna Owens; DF	(United States)	San Leandro, California	FC Bay Area	3/5 stars
Mia Van More; FW	(United States)	Seattle, Washington	Seattle United	3/5 stars

== Squad ==
=== Roster ===
As of February 3, 2026

Note: Flags indicate national team as defined under FIFA eligibility rules; some limited exceptions apply. Players may hold more than one non-FIFA nationality.

No.	Pos.	Nation	Player
0	GK	USA	Sophia Keel
1	GK	USA	Teagan Wy
2	FW	GER	Amelie Hoppe
3	DF	USA	Gianna Owens
4	MF	USA	Reese Doherty
6	FW	USA	Kenley Whittaker
7	FW	USA	Mia Fontana
8	GK	USA	Morgan Farnham
9	FW	USA	Mia Van More
11	FW	USA	Elhom Khursand
12	DF	USA	Elle Kivo
13	FW	USA	Malia McMahon
14	DF	NZL	Emily Humphrey
15	DF	USA	Hope Luebbe Davidson
16	FW	USA	Soleil Dimry

No.	Pos.	Nation	Player
17	MF	USA	Alex Klos
18	GK	USA	Maddie Gambs
19	FW	USA	Lumi Kostmayer
20	DF	USA	Olivia McPherson
22	MF	SCO	Cara Borthwick
23	MF	USA	Lizzie Vranesh
24	DF	USA	Summer Starsiak
25	MF	USA	Campbell Carroll
26	DF	GER	Miriam Hils
28	MF	USA	Victoria Jones
34	MF	USA	Emelia Warta
36	MF	USA	Coco Thistle
39	MF	USA	Noelle Bond-Flasza
40	DF	USA	Archer Streelman

=== Team management ===
Position	Staff
Head coach	Neil McGuire
Associate Head Coach	Cori Callahan
Assistant Coach	Alec Sundly

== Schedule ==
Date Time, TV	Rank^{#}	Opponent^{#}	Result	Record	Site (Attendance) City, State
Exhibition
August 8*; 5:00 p.m.		Saint Mary's	T 2–2	—	Edwards Stadium; Berkeley, CA
Regular season
August 14*; 7:00 p.m., ESPN+		at UC San Diego	W 3–2	1–0–0	Triton Soccer Stadium (407); La Jolla, CA
August 17*; 2:00 p.m., ACCNX		at Cal State Fullerton	T 0–0	1–0–1	Titan Stadium (517); Fullerton, CA
August 21*; 4:30 p.m., ACCNX		San Francisco	W 3–2	2–0–1	Edwards Stadium (113); Berkeley, CA
August 24*; 1:00 p.m., ACCNX		Pepperdine	L 0–1	2–1–1	Edwards Stadium (363); Berkeley, CA
August 28*; 6:00 p.m., ESPN+		at Utah Valley	T 1–1	2–1–2	Wolverine Stadium (1,559); Orem, UT
August 31*; 1:00 p.m., ACCNX		Arizona	W 2–1	3–1–2	Edwards Stadium (338); Berkeley, CA
September 4*; 3:00 p.m., ACCNX		Washington State	T 0–0	3–1–3	Edwards Stadium (225); Berkeley, CA
September 7*; 1:00 p.m., ESPN+		at Cal Poly	T 0–0	3–1–4	Alex G. Spanos Stadium (744); San Luis Obispo, CA
September 11; 4:00 p.m., ACCNX		at Pittsburgh	W 2–1	4–1–4 (1–0–0)	Ambrose Urbanic Field (498); Pittsburgh, PA
September 14; 10:00 a.m., ACCN		at Clemson	T 2–2	4–1–5 (1–0–1)	Riggs Field (444); Clemson, SC
September 20*; 4:00 p.m., ACCNX		Santa Clara	W 2–0	5–1–5	Edwards Stadium (639); Berkeley, CA
September 25; 4:00 p.m., ACCNX		Syracuse	W 1–0	6–1–5 (2–0–1)	Edwards Stadium (198); Berkeley, CA
September 28; 1:00 p.m., ACCNX		Boston College	T 0–0	6–1–6 (2–0–2)	Edwards Stadium (563); Berkeley, CA
October 5; 11:00 a.m., ACCN		at SMU	L 1–2	6–2–6 (2–1–2)	Washburne Stadium (544); Dallas, TX
October 9; 3:30 p.m., ACCNX		No. 1 Virginia	T 2–2	6–2–7 (2–1–3)	Edwards Stadium (108); Berkeley, CA
October 12; 1:00 p.m., ACCNX		Virginia Tech	W 1–0	7–2–7 (3–1–3)	Edwards Stadium (372); Berkeley, CA
October 16; 4:00 p.m., ACCNX		at Miami (FL)	W 2–0	8–2–7 (4–1–3)	Cobb Stadium (145); Coral Gables, FL
October 19; 10:00 a.m., ACCNX		at No. 7 Florida State	T 2–2	8–2–8 (4–1–4)	Seminole Soccer Complex (542); Tallahassee, FL
October 30; 3:00 p.m., ACCNX		No. 1 Stanford; Rivalry	L 2–8	8–3–8 (4–3–4)	Edwards Stadium (346); Berkeley, CA
*Non-conference game. ^{#}Rankings from United Soccer Coaches. (#) Tournament seedings in parentheses. All times are in Pacific.

== Awards and honors ==
Recipient	Award	Date	Ref.
Teagan Wy	Pre-season All-ACC Team	August 7	
Teagan Wy	Top Drawer Soccer Preseason Best XI Third Team	August 12	
Teagan Wy	ACC Defensive Player of the Week – Week 4	September 9	
Teagan Wy	ACC Defensive Player of the Week – Week 7	September 30	
Teagan Wy	ACC Defensive Player of the Week – Week 9	October 14	
Teagan Wy	ACC Defensive Player of the Week – Week 10	October 21	

== Rankings ==
Ranking movements Legend: ██ Increase in ranking ██ Decrease in ranking — = Not ranked RV = Received votes
	Week																
Poll	Pre	1	2	3	4	5	6	7	8	9	10	11	12	13	14	15	Final
United Soccer	RV	—	—	—	—	—	—	RV	—	—	—	—	—	Not released			—
TopDrawer Soccer	—	—	—	—	—	—	—	—	—	—	21	17	—	—	—	—	—
