= 2025 Syracuse Orange women's soccer team =

American college soccer season

2025 Syracuse Orange women's soccer
- Conference: Atlantic Coast Conference
- Record: 5–9–4 (1–8–1 ACC)
- Head coach: Nicky Adams (7th season)
- Assistant coaches: Brandon DeNoyer (6th season); Alex Zaroyan (3rd season)
- Home stadium: SU Soccer Stadium

2025 ACC women's soccer standings
	Conf.						Overall
Team	W		L		T	PCT	W		L		T	PCT
No. 2 Stanford ‍†‍‡‍^{y}	9	–	0	–	1	.950	21	–	2	–	2	.880
No. 11 Notre Dame ‍‍‍^{y}	8	–	1	–	1	.850	15	–	2	–	3	.825
No. 3 Duke ‍‍‍^{y}	7	–	3	–	0	.700	17	–	5	–	1	.761
No. 1 Florida State ‍‍‍^{y}	6	–	2	–	2	.700	16	–	2	–	4	.818
No. 8 Virginia ‍‍‍^{y}	6	–	2	–	2	.700	14	–	3	–	5	.750
No. 24 Louisville ‍‍‍^{y}	6	–	2	–	2	.700	13	–	5	–	3	.690
No. 13т North Carolina ‍‍‍^{y}	6	–	4	–	0	.600	13	–	6	–	2	.667
California ‍‍‍	4	–	2	–	4	.600	8	–	3	–	8	.632
Wake Forest ‍‍‍^{y}	4	–	3	–	3	.550	11	–	5	–	4	.650
NC State ‍‍‍	4	–	4	–	2	.500	5	–	9	–	4	.389
Clemson ‍‍‍^{y}	4	–	4	–	2	.500	8	–	6	–	5	.553
SMU ‍‍‍	2	–	6	–	2	.300	8	–	8	–	2	.500
Pittsburgh ‍‍‍	2	–	8	–	0	.200	6	–	10	–	2	.389
Miami (FL) ‍‍‍	1	–	7	–	2	.200	7	–	8	–	3	.472
Boston College ‍‍‍	1	–	7	–	2	.200	5	–	8	–	5	.417
Syracuse ‍‍‍	1	–	8	–	1	.150	5	–	9	–	4	.389
Virginia Tech ‍‍‍	0	–	8	–	2	.100	4	–	10	–	4	.333
† – Conference champion ‡ – 2025 ACC Tournament champion y – Invited to the NCAA Tournament; As of December 9, 2025; Rankings from United Soccer Coaches Poll; Source: The ACC

The 2025 Syracuse Orange women's soccer team represented Syracuse University during the 2025 NCAA Division I women's soccer season. The Orange were led by head coach Nicky Adams, in her seventh season. They played their home games at SU Soccer Stadium in Syracuse, New York. This was the team's 29th season playing organized women's college soccer, and their 12th playing in the Atlantic Coast Conference.

The Orange started the season with a 5–0 win over Charleston Southern, but couldn't keep the momentum going as their lost their next match to Niagara. They won their next two games, before drawing their next three games. Over their three game tie streak, they only scored one goal. They finished the non-conference portion of their season with a 3–0 victory over Cornell. Their ACC season started with a 1–1 draw against SMU. The season took a downward turn from their as the Orange lost their next five games in a row. Three of those games were against ranked opponents, in number one Virginia, number three Stanford, and number seven Florida State. They broke the streak with a 1–0 defeat of Miami in Coral Gables. That would be Syracuse' final win of the season as they lost their final three games. They faced two ranked teams in that stretch, number seven Duke and number twenty three North Carolina.

The Orange finished the season 5–9–4, 1–8–1 in ACC play to finish in sixteenth place. They did not qualify for the ACC Tournament. They were not invited to the NCAA Tournament. Their one conference win was their first since 2022, and their nine losses were their least since that season.

== Previous season ==
The Orange finished the season 6–10–2, 0–9–1 in ACC play to finish in seventeenth place. They did not qualify for the ACC Tournament. They were not invited to the NCAA Tournament.

== Offseason ==
=== Departures ===
Departures
Name	Number	Pos.	Height	Year	Hometown	Reason for departure
Abby Ross	1	GK	5'6"	(redshirt) Junior	Rock Hill, South Carolina	Graduated
Liesel Odden	2	MF	5'2"	Senior	Oregon, Wisconsin	Graduated; transferred to Grand Canyon
Caitlin Driscoll	3	MF	5'7"	Freshman	Sherborn, Massachusetts	Transferred to Providence
Iba Oching	11	DF	5'8"	Freshman	Coquitlam, Canada	Transferred to Iowa
Kate Murphy	14	DF	5'7"	Graduate Student	Plano, Texas	Graduated
Kylen Grant	17	DF	5'5"	Senior	Ottawa, Canada	Graduated
Aysia Cobb	18	FW	5'6"	Graduate Student	Plantation, Florida	Graduated
Grace Franklin	25	DF	5'5"	Senior	Arlington, Virginia	Graduated
Erin Flurey	26	FW	5'4"	(redshirt) Junior	Manchester, New Hampshire	Graduated; transferred to Auburn
Allie Fouts	28	FW	5'5"	Freshman	Lake Orion, Michigan	—
Amanda Goldstein	31	MF	5'3"	Freshman	Redondo Beach, California	—
Dalani Stephens	32	MF	5'8"	Graduate Student	Round Hill, Virginia	Graduated

=== Incoming transfers ===
Incoming transfers
Name	Number	Pos.	Height	Year	Hometown	Previous school
Jasmine Nixon	3	DF	5'9"	Sophomore	Fort Mill, South Carolina	Kentucky
Natalie Magnotta	14	DF	5'9"	(redshirt) Freshman	Berwyn, Pennsylvania	Penn State

=== Recruiting class ===
Name	Nationality	Hometown	Club	TDS Rating
Julia Arbelaez; MF	(United States)	Yorktown Heights, New York	New York SC	3/5 stars
Olivia Bozzo; MF	(United States)	St. James, New York	SUSA FC Academy	3/5 stars
Bree Bridges; DF	(United States)	Manassas, Virginia	Virginia Development Academy	3/5 stars
Abigail Incorvaia; FW	(United States)	Waldwick, New Jersey	Match Fit Academy FC	3/5 stars

== Squad ==
=== Roster ===
As of December 1, 2025

Note: Flags indicate national team as defined under FIFA eligibility rules; some limited exceptions apply. Players may hold more than one non-FIFA nationality.

No.	Pos.	Nation	Player
0	GK	USA	Sam Haley
2	MF	USA	Julia Arbelaez
3	DF	USA	Jasmine Nixon
4	FW	USA	Ashley Rauch (Captain)
5	MF	SWE	Julia Coval
6	FW	USA	Mia Klammer
7	FW	USA	Ava Uribe
8	FW	CAN	Vita Naihin
9	DF	USA	Kendyl Lauher
10	MF	USA	Gabby Wisbeck
11	FW	USA	Moo Galbus
12	DF	USA	Aleena Ulke
13	FW	USA	Anna Rupert
14	DF	USA	Natalie Magnotta

No.	Pos.	Nation	Player
15	FW	USA	Maya McDermott
16	FW	CAN	Leda Naihin
17	MF	USA	Abby Incorvaia
18	MF	USA	Olivia Bozzo
19	DF	USA	Anna Croyle
20	DF	USA	Emma Klein (Captain)
21	MF	USA	Mackenzie Dupre
22	DF	USA	Cierra Collins
23	FW	USA	Julia Dening
24	DF	USA	Caro Monterrey
27	GK	USA	Blythe Braun
29	GK	USA	Lilly Heaslet
30	GK	USA	Shea Vanderbosch (Captain)
33	DF	USA	Bree Bridges

=== Team management ===
Position	Staff
Head coach	Nicky Thrasher Adams
Assistant coach	Brandon DeNoyer
Assistant coach	Alex Zaroyan

== Schedule ==
Date Time, TV	Rank^{#}	Opponent^{#}	Result	Record	Site (Attendance) City, State
Exhibition
August 6*; 7:00 p.m.		Colgate	W 1–0	–	Beyer-Small '76 Field; Hamilton, NY
August 10*; 1:00 p.m.		LeMoyne	W 5–1	–	SU Soccer Stadium; Syracuse, NY
Non-conference regular season
August 15 (Note: Originally schedule for August 14, but delayed due to weather)*; 1:00 p.m., ACCNX		Charleston Southern	W 5–0	1–0–0	SU Soccer Stadium (390); Syracuse, NY
August 17*; 1:00 p.m., ACCNX		Niagara	L 1–2	1–1–0	SU Soccer Stadium (344); Syracuse, NY
August 21*; 3:00 p.m., ACCNX		Canisius	W 4–0	2–1–0	SU Soccer Stadium (290); Syracuse, NY
August 24*; 1:00 p.m., ESPN+		at Holy Cross	W 3–1	3–1–0	Smith Stadium (311); Worcester, MA
August 28*; 2:30 p.m., ESPN+		at Quinnipiac	T 1–1	3–1–1	Quinnipiac Soccer Stadium (217); Hamden, CT
August 31*; 11:00 a.m., ESPN+		at Princeton	T 0–0	3–1–2	Roberts Stadium (703); Princeton, NJ
September 4*; 7:00 p.m., ACCNX		Binghamton	T 0–0	3–1–3	SU Soccer Stadium (112); Syracuse, NY
September 7*; 1:00 p.m., ACCNX		Cornell	W 3–0	4–1–3	SU Soccer Stadium (470); Syracuse, NY
ACC regular season
September 11; 7:00 p.m., ACCNX		SMU	T 1–1	4–1–4 (0–0–1)	SU Soccer Stadium (265); Syracuse, NY
September 14; 1:00 p.m., ACCNX		No. 7 Florida State	L 0–4	4–2–4 (0–1–1)	SU Soccer Stadium (321); Syracuse, NY
September 20; 7:00 p.m., ACCNX		No. 1 Virginia	L 0–3	4–3–4 (0–2–1)	SU Soccer Stadium (1,244); Syracuse, NY
September 25; 7:00 p.m., ACCNX		at California	L 0–1	4–4–4 (0–3–1)	Edwards Stadium (198); Berkeley, CA
September 28; 4:00 p.m., ACCNX		at No. 3 Stanford	L 0–4	4–5–4 (0–4–1)	Cagan Stadium (1,832); Stanford, CA
October 5; 7:00 p.m., ACCNX		Clemson	L 1–2	4–6–4 (0–5–1)	SU Soccer Stadium (330); Syracuse, NY
October 11; 7:00 p.m., ACCNX		at Miami (FL)	W 1–0	5–6–4 (1–5–1)	Cobb Stadium (223); Coral Gables, FL
October 19; 12:00 p.m., ACCNX		Boston College	L 0–1	5–7–4 (1–6–1)	SU Soccer Stadium (544); Syracuse, NY
October 23; 7:00 p.m., ACCNX		at No. 7 Duke	L 0–2	5–8–4 (1–7–1)	Koskinen Stadium (515); Durham, NC
October 26; 1:00 p.m., ACCNX		at No. 23 North Carolina	L 2–4	5–9–4 (1–8–1)	Dorrance Field (1,401); Chapel Hill, NC
*Non-conference game. ^{#}Rankings from United Soccer Coaches. (#) Tournament seedings in parentheses.

== Rankings ==
Ranking movements Legend: — = Not ranked
	Week																
Poll	Pre	1	2	3	4	5	6	7	8	9	10	11	12	13	14	15	Final
United Soccer	—	—	—	—	—	—	—	—	—	—	—	—	—	Not released			—
TopDrawer Soccer	—	—	—	—	—	—	—	—	—	—	—	—	—	—	—	—	—
