= 2025 Duke Blue Devils women's soccer team =

American college soccer season

2025 Duke Blue Devils women's soccer

NCAA Tournament, College Cup
- Conference: Atlantic Coast Conference
- U. Soc. Coaches poll: No. 3
- TopDrawerSoccer.com: No. 4
- Record: 17–5–1 (7–3–0 ACC)
- Head coach: Kieran Hall (7th overall, 1st head coach season)
- Associate head coach: Carla Overbeck (32nd season)
- Assistant coach: Hanna Gardner (1st season)
- Home stadium: Koskinen Stadium

2025 ACC women's soccer standings
	Conf.						Overall
Team	W		L		T	PCT	W		L		T	PCT
No. 2 Stanford ‍†‍‡‍^{y}	9	–	0	–	1	.950	21	–	2	–	2	.880
No. 11 Notre Dame ‍‍‍^{y}	8	–	1	–	1	.850	15	–	2	–	3	.825
No. 3 Duke ‍‍‍^{y}	7	–	3	–	0	.700	17	–	5	–	1	.761
No. 1 Florida State ‍‍‍^{y}	6	–	2	–	2	.700	16	–	2	–	4	.818
No. 8 Virginia ‍‍‍^{y}	6	–	2	–	2	.700	14	–	3	–	5	.750
No. 24 Louisville ‍‍‍^{y}	6	–	2	–	2	.700	13	–	5	–	3	.690
No. 13т North Carolina ‍‍‍^{y}	6	–	4	–	0	.600	13	–	6	–	2	.667
California ‍‍‍	4	–	2	–	4	.600	8	–	3	–	8	.632
Wake Forest ‍‍‍^{y}	4	–	3	–	3	.550	11	–	5	–	4	.650
NC State ‍‍‍	4	–	4	–	2	.500	5	–	9	–	4	.389
Clemson ‍‍‍^{y}	4	–	4	–	2	.500	8	–	6	–	5	.553
SMU ‍‍‍	2	–	6	–	2	.300	8	–	8	–	2	.500
Pittsburgh ‍‍‍	2	–	8	–	0	.200	6	–	10	–	2	.389
Miami (FL) ‍‍‍	1	–	7	–	2	.200	7	–	8	–	3	.472
Boston College ‍‍‍	1	–	7	–	2	.200	5	–	8	–	5	.417
Syracuse ‍‍‍	1	–	8	–	1	.150	5	–	9	–	4	.389
Virginia Tech ‍‍‍	0	–	8	–	2	.100	4	–	10	–	4	.333
† – Conference champion ‡ – 2025 ACC Tournament champion y – Invited to the NCAA Tournament; As of December 9, 2025; Rankings from United Soccer Coaches Poll; Source: The ACC

The 2025 Duke Blue Devils women's soccer team represented Duke University during the 2025 NCAA Division I women's soccer season. The Blue Devils were led by head coach Kieran Hall, in his first season. They played their home games at Koskinen Stadium in Durham, North Carolina. This was the team's 38th season playing organized women's college soccer and their 37th playing in the Atlantic Coast Conference. Hall replaced twenty-four year head coach Robbie Church during the offseason.

The Blue Devils began the season ranked fourth in the United Soccer Coaches poll. They opened the season with a 3–2 victory over eleventh ranked Penn State. The victory propelled them to the top of the rankings. After a 3–0 defeat of Northwestern they fell to third. There they defeated eighth ranked Arkansas 3–0 but did not move for the rest of their non-conference schedule. They won two and drew one of their remaining games, with the draw coming against Alabama. They rose to second in the rankings where they began the ACC season. They lost three of their first four ACC matches, with the lone win coming against Miami. They lost to fifth ranked Virginia, sixth ranked Notre Dame, and nineteenth ranked Wake Forest. The skid saw them fall to fourteenth in the rankings. However, the Blue Devils won the remainder of their ACC games. They only played two ranked games over the stretch, defeating rival and nineteenth ranked North Carolina 3–2 and twenty-fifth ranked Clemson, also 3–2, on the final day of the regular season.

The Blue Devils finished the regular season 12–3–1 and 7–3–0 in ACC play to finish in third place. As the third seed in the ACC Tournament, they hosted sixth seed and twenty-first ranked Louisville in the First Round. They won 1–0 to advance to the Semifinals. There they lost to second seed and second ranked Notre Dame in a rematch of a September 18 matchup. Duke lost again in the post season, this time 2–1. The Blue Devils received an at-large bid to the 2025 NCAA Division I women's soccer tournament where they were the second seed in the Virginia. They defeated Elon in the First Round, eighth seed UCF in the Second Round, and third seed Kansas in the Round of 16. They defeated fourth seed and thirteenth ranked Washington 3–0 in the Quarterfinals. Duke advanced to the College Cup and faced top seed and top ranked Stanford. They lost 0–1 to end their season with a 17–5–1 overall record. Falling one win short of their win total from last year.

== Previous season ==
The Blue Devils finished the regular season 14–1–1 and 9–0–1 in ACC play to finish as conference champions. This was Duke's fourth regular season ACC title in program history. As the first seed in the ACC Tournament, they earned a bye to the Semifinals where they faced North Carolina for a third time that season. Duke could not make it three wins in a row and lost 2–1. The Blue Devils received an at-large bid to the 2024 NCAA Division I women's soccer tournament where they were the first seed in the Duke Bracket. They were also the top overall seed in the tournament. They defeated Howard in the First Round, eighth seed and seventeenth ranked Texas Tech in the Second Round, and fifth-seed and sixteenth ranked Michigan State in the Round of 16. They defeated fellow ACC team Virginia Tech, who was the seventh seed and ranked twelfth, 1–0 in the Quarterfinals. Duke advanced to the College Cup and faced North Carolina for a fourth time this season. North Carolina won 3–0 to end Duke's season. Duke won both regular season matches, and the Tar Heels won both postseason matches between the rivals. The Blue Devil's final record was 18–3–1. Their eighteen wins were the most since 2017, the last time they made the College Cup.

== Offseason ==
=== Departures ===
Departures
Name	Number	Pos.	Height	Year	Hometown	Reason for departure
Leah Freeman	0	GK	5'10"	Graduate Student	Berkeley, California	Graduated; Signed professional contract with San Diego Wave FC
Ella Hase	3	FW	5'5"	Graduate Student	Orland Park, Illinois	Graduated; Signed professional contract with Racing Louisville FC
Baleigh Bruster	4	DF	5'7"	Senior	Atlanta, Georgia	Graduated; transferred to Clemson
Mary Long	10	MF/FW	5'10"	Freshman	Mission Hills, Kansas	Signed professional contract with Kansas City Current
Nicky Chico	17	DF	5'4"	Graduate Student	Wyckoff, New Jersey	Graduated
Hannah Bebar	18	MF	5'4"	Graduate Student	Naperville, Illinois	Graduated; Signed professional contract with Bay FC
Maggie Graham	19	MF	5'9"	Graduate Student	Atlanta, Georgia	Graduated; Signed professional contract with Houston Dash
Kelly Wilson	20	DF	5'10"	Senior	Manhattan Beach, California	Graduated
Katie Groff	21	DF	5'7"	Graduate Student	Raleigh, North Carolina	Graduated

=== Recruiting class ===
Name	Nationality	Hometown	Club	TDS Rating
Alexis Coughlin; DF	(United States)	Corona, California	Legends FC	4/5 stars
Kaylee Kim; FW	(United States)	Belmont, California	FC Bay Area	4/5 stars
Daya King; DF	(United States)	Moreno Valley, California	Legends FC	4/5 stars
Kosette Koons-Perdikis; MF	(United States)	Chevy Chase, Maryland	Virginia Union FC	3/5 stars
Avery Oder; FW	(United States)	Calabasas, California	Beach FC	4/5 stars
Jocelyn Travers; DF	(United States)	Santa Cruz, California	Bay Area Surf	4/5 stars
Molly Vapensky; GK	(United States)	Evanston, Illinois	FC United	4/5 stars

== Squad ==
=== Roster ===
As of February 9, 2026

Note: Flags indicate national team as defined under FIFA eligibility rules; some limited exceptions apply. Players may hold more than one non-FIFA nationality.

No.	Pos.	Nation	Player
0	GK	USA	Molly Vapensky
2	FW	USA	Kat Rader
3	DF	USA	Daya King
4	DF	USA	Jocelyn Travers
5	DF	USA	Phoebe Goldthwaite
6	MF	USA	Devin Lynch
7	DF	USA	Cameron Roller
8	FW	USA	Elle Piper
9	MF	USA	Lauren Martinho
10	FW	USA	Avery Oder
11	FW	USA	Julia Saunicheva
12	MF	USA	Taylor Evans
13	FW	USA	Mia Minestrella

No.	Pos.	Nation	Player
14	FW	USA	Sophia Recupero
15	FW	USA	Mia Oliaro
16	MF	USA	Carina Lageyre
17	FW	USA	Farrah Walters
20	DF	USA	Kosette Koons-Perdikis
21	DF	USA	Lexi Coughlin
22	DF	USA	Sam Bodensteiner
24	DF	USA	Kaeden Koons-Perdikis
25	FW	USA	Madison Foxhoven
26	GK	USA	Bianca Dominguez
27	FW	USA	Kaylee Kim
30	GK	USA	Caroline Dysart

=== Team management ===
Position	Staff
Head coach	Kieran Hall
Associate head coach	Carla Overbeck
Assistant coach	Hanna Gardner
Director of Operations	Evan Gaffney

== Schedule ==
Date Time, TV	Rank^{#}	Opponent^{#}	Result	Record	Site (Attendance) City, State
Exhibition
August 4*; 6:00 p.m.	No. 4	Carolina Ascent FC	T 0–0	—	Koskinen Stadium; Durham, NC
August 8*; 6:00 p.m.	No. 4	at No. 21 South Carolina	None Reported	—	Stone Stadium; Columbia, SC
Non-conference regular season
August 14*; 7:00 p.m., ACCNX	No. 4	No. 11 Penn State	W 3–2	1–0–0	Koskinen Stadium (801); Durham, NC
August 21*; 6:00 p.m., ACCNX	No. 1	Northwestern	W 3–0	2–0–0	Koskinen Stadium (645); Durham, NC
August 28*; 7:00 p.m., SECN+	No. 3	at No. 8 Arkansas	W 2–0	3–0–0	Razorback Field (2,652); Fayetteville, AR
August 31*; 5:00 p.m., ACCNX	No. 3	Creighton	W 1–0	4–0–0	Koskinen Stadium (744); Durham, NC
September 4*; 7:00 p.m., ACCNX	No. 3	VMI	W 9–0	5–0–0	Koskinen Stadium (301); Durham, NC
September 7*; 1:30 p.m., ACCN	No. 3	Alabama	T 1–1	5–0–1	Koskinen Stadium (817); Durham, NC
ACC regular season
September 11; 7:00 p.m., ACCNX	No. 2	at No. 5 Virginia	L 1–3	5–1–1 (0–1–0)	Klöckner Stadium (1,857); Charlottesville, VA
September 14; 1:00 p.m., ACCNX	No. 2	at Miami	W 1–0	6–1–1 (1–1–0)	Cobb Stadium (275); Coral Gables, FL
September 18; 7:00 p.m., ACCNX	No. 3	at No. 6 Notre Dame	L 2–3	6–2–1 (1–2–0)	Alumni Stadium (1,277); Notre Dame, IN
September 25; 7:00 p.m., ACCNX	No. 9	No. 19 Wake Forest	L 2–3	6–3–1 (1–3–0)	Koskinen Stadium (484); Durham, NC
October 2; 7:00 p.m., ACCNX	No. 14	Pittsburgh	W 5–0	7–3–1 (2–3–0)	Koskinen Stadium (377); Durham, NC
October 12; 1:00 p.m., ESPNU	No. 14т	No. 19 North Carolina; Rivalry	W 3–2	8–3–1 (3–3–0)	Koskinen Stadium (1,541); Durham, NC
October 18; 7:00 p.m., ACCNX	No. 9	at Virginia Tech	W 3–2	9–3–1 (4–3–0)	Thompson Field (1,198); Blacksburg, VA
October 23; 7:00 p.m., ACCNX	No. 7	Syracuse	W 2–0	10–3–1 (5–3–0)	Koskinen Stadium (515); Durham, NC
October 26; 7:00 p.m., ACCN	No. 7	at NC State	W 3–1	11–3–1 (6–3–0)	Dail Soccer Field (1,308); Raleigh, NC
October 30; 7:00 p.m., ACCNX	No. 10	No. 25 Clemson	W 3–2	12–3–1 (7–3–0)	Koskinen Stadium (646); Durham, NC
ACC Tournament
November 2*; 6:00 p.m., ACCN	(3) No. 10	(6) No. 21 Louisville; First Round	W 1–0	13–3–1	Koskinen Stadium (377); Durham, NC
November 6*; 5:30 p.m., ACCN	(3) No. 11	vs. (2) No. 2 Notre Dame; Semifinals	L 1–2	13–4–1	WakeMed Soccer Park (1,077); Cary, NC
NCAA Tournament
November 14*; 6:00 p.m., ESPN+	(2) No. 11	Elon; First Round	W 3–0	14–4–1	Koskinen Stadium (706); Durham, NC
November 20*; 6:30 p.m., ESPN+	(2) No. 11	(7) UCF; Second Round	W 1–0	15–4–1	Koskinen Stadium (882); Durham, NC
November 23*; 2:00 p.m., ESPN+	(2) No. 11	(3) Kansas; Round of 16	W 2–0	16–4–1	Koskinen Stadium (826); Durham, NC
November 28*; 6:00 p.m., ESPN+	(2) No. 11	(4) No. 13 Washington; Quarterfinals	W 3–0	17–4–1	Koskinen Stadium (1,200); Durham, NC
December 5*; 8:45 p.m., ESPNU	(2) No. 11	vs. (1) No. 1 Stanford; Semifinals	L 0–1	17–5–1	CPKC Stadium (7,066); Kansas City, MO
*Non-conference game. ^{#}Rankings from United Soccer Coaches. (#) Tournament seedings in parentheses. All times are in Eastern.

== Awards and honors ==
Recipient	Award	Date	Ref.
Mia Minestrella	Preseason All-ACC Team	August 7	
Mia Oliaro	Preseason All-ACC Team	August 7	
Cameron Roller	Preseason All-ACC Team	August 7	
Cameron Roller	Top Drawer Soccer Preseason Best XI First Team	August 12	
Mia Oliaro	Top Drawer Soccer Preseason Best XI Second Team	August 12	
Avery Oder	Top Drawer Soccer Preseason Best XI Freshman Team	August 12	
Cameron Roller	Hermann Trophy Preseason Watchlist	August 14	
Mia Oliaro	Hermann Trophy Preseason Watchlist	August 14	
Mia Minestrella	ACC Offensive Player of the Week – Week 1	August 19	
Devin Lynch	ACC Co-Offensive Player of the Week – Week 3	September 2	
Cameron Roller	ACC Defensive Player of the Week – Week 3	September 2	
Mia Minestrella	All-ACC First Team	November 5	
Kat Rader	All-ACC Second Team	November 5	
Carina Lageyre	All-ACC Third Team	November 5	
Cameron Roller	All-ACC Third Team	November 5	
Daya King	ACC All-Freshman Team	November 5	
Avery Oder	ACC All-Freshman Team	November 5	
Kat Rader	All-ACC Tournament Team	November 9	

== Rankings ==
Ranking movements Legend: ██ Increase in ranking ██ Decrease in ranking т = Tied with team above or below ( ) = First-place votes
	Week																
Poll	Pre	1	2	3	4	5	6	7	8	9	10	11	12	13	14	15	Final
United Soccer	4	1 (3)	3 (1)	3	2 (1)	3	9	14	14т	9	7	10	11	Not released			3 (1)
TopDrawer Soccer	5	3	3	2	4	5	7	14	14	10	11	10	9	10	10	6	4
