= 2025 NC State Wolfpack women's soccer team =

American college soccer season

2025 NC State Wolfpack women's soccer
- Conference: Atlantic Coast Conference
- Record: 5–9–4 (4–4–2 ACC)
- Head coach: Gary Higgins (1st season)
- Associate head coach: Joanna Fennema (1st season)
- Assistant coaches: David Rodriguez (1st season); Juan Basabe (1st season)
- Home stadium: Dail Soccer Field

2025 ACC women's soccer standings
	Conf.						Overall
Team	W		L		T	PCT	W		L		T	PCT
No. 2 Stanford ‍†‍‡‍^{y}	9	–	0	–	1	.950	21	–	2	–	2	.880
No. 11 Notre Dame ‍‍‍^{y}	8	–	1	–	1	.850	15	–	2	–	3	.825
No. 3 Duke ‍‍‍^{y}	7	–	3	–	0	.700	17	–	5	–	1	.761
No. 1 Florida State ‍‍‍^{y}	6	–	2	–	2	.700	16	–	2	–	4	.818
No. 8 Virginia ‍‍‍^{y}	6	–	2	–	2	.700	14	–	3	–	5	.750
No. 24 Louisville ‍‍‍^{y}	6	–	2	–	2	.700	13	–	5	–	3	.690
No. 13т North Carolina ‍‍‍^{y}	6	–	4	–	0	.600	13	–	6	–	2	.667
California ‍‍‍	4	–	2	–	4	.600	8	–	3	–	8	.632
Wake Forest ‍‍‍^{y}	4	–	3	–	3	.550	11	–	5	–	4	.650
NC State ‍‍‍	4	–	4	–	2	.500	5	–	9	–	4	.389
Clemson ‍‍‍^{y}	4	–	4	–	2	.500	8	–	6	–	5	.553
SMU ‍‍‍	2	–	6	–	2	.300	8	–	8	–	2	.500
Pittsburgh ‍‍‍	2	–	8	–	0	.200	6	–	10	–	2	.389
Miami (FL) ‍‍‍	1	–	7	–	2	.200	7	–	8	–	3	.472
Boston College ‍‍‍	1	–	7	–	2	.200	5	–	8	–	5	.417
Syracuse ‍‍‍	1	–	8	–	1	.150	5	–	9	–	4	.389
Virginia Tech ‍‍‍	0	–	8	–	2	.100	4	–	10	–	4	.333
† – Conference champion ‡ – 2025 ACC Tournament champion y – Invited to the NCAA Tournament; As of December 9, 2025; Rankings from United Soccer Coaches Poll; Source: The ACC

The 2025 NC State Wolfpack women's soccer team represented NC State University during the 2025 NCAA Division I women's soccer season. The Wolfpack were led by head coach Gary Higgins, in his first season. They played their home games at Dail Soccer Field in Raleigh, North Carolina. Higgins entered his first year as head coach as prior head coach Tim Santoro was fired after the 2024 season. This was the team's 42nd season playing organized women's college soccer and their 39th playing in the Atlantic Coast Conference.

The Wolfpack started slowly, losing five of their first six games. The other game was a 1–1 tie at East Carolina. They lost two of the five games against Power 4 competition in 20th ranked Michigan State and Utah. They finished their non-conference schedule with a 0–0 draw at Elon, and they defeated Campbell on September 7 for their first victory of the season. The Wolfpack began ACC play with a loss to 6th ranked Notre Dame, before going on a six-game undefeated streak. The streak included two draws and four wins. They defeated 12th ranked Wake Forest and drew with 7th ranked, and eventual national champions Florida State during the stretch. They could not carry the momentum through to the end of their season, as they lost their last three matches. Two of the three were against ranked teams as they lost to 7th ranked Duke and 20th ranked Louisville. The final match was a loss against rivals North Carolina.

The Wolfpack finished 5–9–4 overall and 4–4–2 in ACC play to finish in a tie for tenth place. They did not qualify for the ACC Tournament and were not invited to the NCAA Tournament. Despite their slow start, they improved their win total from 2024, and their 4 conference wins were the most since the 2021 season.

== Previous season ==
The Wolfpack finished 4–10–4 overall and 1–6–3 in ACC play to finish in a tie for fifteenth place. They did not qualify for the ACC Tournament and were not invited to the NCAA Tournament.

== Offseason ==
=== Departures ===
Departures
Name	Number	Pos.	Height	Year	Hometown	Reason for departure
Brianna Weber	3	DF	5'8"	Senior	San Dimas, California	Graduated
Janet Okeke	4	DF	5'7"	Freshman	Laval, Canada	Transferred to Florida State
Abi Hugh	7	MF	5'4"	Graduate Student	Huntington, West Virginia	Graduated
Hannah Jibril	9	FW	5'7"	Sophomore	Glyndon, Maryland	Transferred to Mississippi State
Annika Wohner	10	MF	5'7"	Senior	Poing, Germany	Graduated
Fernanda Soto	11	DF	5'1"	Senior	Romeoville, Illinois	Graduated
Jaiden Thomas	12	MF	5'10"	Graduate Student	Ponte Vedra Beach, Florida	Graduated
Alivia Kelly	15	DF	5'11"	Graduate Student	Pembroke, Massachusetts	Graduated
Taylor Chism	22	DF	5'9"	Junior	Wilmington, North Carolina	Transferred to Auburn
Paige Tolentino	23	DF	5'5"	Graduate Student	Pinehurst, North Carolina	Graduated
Kennedy Dunnings	24	DF	5'2"	Graduate Student	Virginia Beach, Virginia	Graduated
Savannah Hutchins	25	FW	5'7"	Freshman	Moorpark, California	Transferred to Texas A&M

=== Incoming transfers ===
Incoming transfers
Name	Number	Pos.	Height	Year	Hometown	Previous school
Erica Roberts	7	FW	5'6"	(redshirt) Junior	St. Petersburg, Florida	East Carolina
Tierra Garniss	9	FW	5'8"	(redshirt) Senior	Toronto, Canada	Rhode Island
Lilly Soltz	23	DF	5'4"	Sophomore	Raleigh, North Carolina	Lenoir–Rhyne
Sophia Varga	24	DF	5'7"	Junior	Flagler Beach, Florida	UCLA
Mackenzie Smith	27	FW	5'7"	(redshirt) Junior	Leicester, England	East Carolina

=== Recruiting class ===
Name	Nationality	Hometown	Club	TDS Rating
Martina Cherubini; MF	(Italy)	Rome, Italy	AS Roma	N/A
Daisy Duda; FW	(United States)	Mountain Lakes, New Jersey	PDA	3/5 stars
Maia Lazaro; MF	(England)	London, England	Watford	N/A
Fien Leijdekker; MF	(Netherlands)	Oegstgeest, Netherlands	ADO Den Haag	N/A
Chloe Stanley; DF	(United States)	Nakina, North Carolina	Wilmington Hammerheads FC	3/5 stars
Emily Wong; MF	(Canada)	Coquitlam, Canada	Vancouver Rise FC Academy	N/A

== Squad ==
=== Roster ===
As of February 2, 2026

Note: Flags indicate national team as defined under FIFA eligibility rules; some limited exceptions apply. Players may hold more than one non-FIFA nationality.

No.	Pos.	Nation	Player
1	GK	USA	Olivia Pratapas
2	DF	JPN	Yuna Aoki
4	MF	ENG	Maia Lazaro
5	DF	USA	Alex Mohr
6	MF	JPN	Mana Nakata
7	FW	USA	Erica Roberts
8	MF	CAN	Rosalie Olou
9	FW	CAN	Tierra Garniss
10	FW	URU	Antonella Mazziotto
11	MF	USA	Eliza Rich
13	FW	USA	Jade Bordeleau
14	FW	USA	Madie Miller
15	FW	USA	Daisy Duda

No.	Pos.	Nation	Player
17	MF	CAN	Emily Wong
18	GK	GER	Sina Tölzel
19	DF	CAN	Chloe Stanley
20	DF	USA	Brooklyn Holt
21	MF	USA	Mary Frances Symmes
23	MF	ENG	Lilly Soltz
24	DF	USA	Sophia Varga
25	DF	USA	Avery Richards
26	GK	USA	Emily Earles
27	FW	ENG	Mackenzie Smith
28	MF	USA	Sophia Hernandez
29	MF	NED	Fien Leijdekker

=== Team management ===
Position	Staff
Athletic Director	Boo Corrigan
Head coach	Gary Higgins
Associate head coach	Joanna Fennema
Assistant Coach	David Rodriguez
Assistant Coach	Juan Basabe
Director of Operations	Lizzie Hedrick

== Schedule ==
Date Time, TV	Rank^{#}	Opponent^{#}	Result	Record	Site (Attendance) City, State
Exhibition
August 9*; 1:00 p.m.		at Liberty	None Reported	–	Osborne Stadium; Lynchburg, VA
Non-conference regular season
August 14*; 7:00 p.m., ACCNX		James Madison	L 0–3	0–1–0	Dail Soccer Field (1,645); Raleigh, NC
August 17*; 7:00 p.m., ESPN+		at East Carolina	T 1–1	0–1–1	Stewart Johnson Stadium (550); Greenville, NC
August 21*; 7:00 p.m., BTN+		at No. 20 Michigan State	L 0–3	0–2–1	DeMartin Soccer Complex (4,025); East Lansing, MI
August 24*; 1:00 p.m., ESPN+		at Davidson	L 0–1	0–3–1	Alumni Soccer Stadium (252); Davidson, NC
August 27*; 7:00 p.m., ACCNX		Western Carolina	L 2–3	0–4–1	Dail Soccer Field (450); Raleigh, NC
August 31*; 9:00 p.m., ESPN+		at Utah	L 0–3	0–5–1	Ute Soccer Field (674); Salt Lake City, UT
September 4*; 7:00 p.m., FloCollege		at Elon	T 0–0	0–5–2	Rudd Field (216); Elon, NC
September 7*; 7:00 p.m., ACCNX		Campbell	W 4–0	1–5–2	Dail Soccer Field (1,242); Raleigh, NC
ACC regular season
September 11; 7:00 p.m., ACCNX		No. 6 Notre Dame	L 1–2	1–6–2 (0–1–0)	Dail Soccer Field (606); Raleigh, NC
September 18; 7:00 p.m., ACCNX		at SMU	W 1–0	2–6–2 (1–1–0)	Washburne Stadium (325); Dallas, TX
September 21; 1:00 p.m., ACCNX		No. 7 Florida State	T 1–1	2–6–3 (1–1–1)	Dail Soccer Field (1,007); Raleigh, NC
September 27; 7:00 p.m., ACCNX		at Virginia Tech	T 4–4	2–6–4 (1–1–2)	Thompson Field (121); Blacksburg, VA
October 2; 7:00 p.m., ACCN		No. 12 Wake Forest	W 2–1	3–6–4 (2–1–2)	Dail Soccer Field (1,001); Raleigh, NC
October 9; 7:00 p.m., ACCNX		at Boston College	W 1–0	4–6–4 (3–1–2)	Newton Campus Soccer Field (350); Chestnut Hill, MA
October 17; 7:00 p.m., ACCNX		at Pittsburgh	W 1–0	5–6–4 (4–1–2)	Ambrose Urbanic Field (823); Pittsburgh, PA
October 23; 7:00 p.m., ACCNX		No. 20 Louisville	L 0–3	5–7–4 (4–2–2)	Dail Soccer Field (372); Raleigh, NC
October 26; 7:00 p.m., ACCN		No. 7 Duke	L 1–3	5–8–4 (4–3–2)	Dail Soccer Field (1,308); Raleigh, NC
October 30; 8:00 p.m., ACCN		at North Carolina	L 0–1	5–9–4 (4–4–2)	Dorrance Field (2,561); Chapel Hill, NC
*Non-conference game. ^{#}Rankings from United Soccer Coaches. (#) Tournament seedings in parentheses. All times are in Eastern.

== Awards and honors ==
Recipient	Award	Date	Ref.
Olivia Pratapas	ACC Defensive Player of the Week – Week 6	September 23	
Jade Bordeleau	ACC Co-Offensive Player of the Week – Week 8	October 7	
Olivia Pratapas	ACC Defensive Player of the Week – Week 8	October 7	
Jade Bordeleau	All-ACC Second Team	November 5	

== Rankings ==
Ranking movements Legend: — = Not ranked
	Week																
Poll	Pre	1	2	3	4	5	6	7	8	9	10	11	12	13	14	15	Final
United Soccer	—	—	—	—	—	—	—	—	—	—	—	—	—	Not released			—
TopDrawer Soccer	—	—	—	—	—	—	—	—	—	—	—	—	—	—	—	—	—
