= 2025 Clemson Tigers women's soccer team =

American college soccer season

2025 Clemson Tigers women's soccer

NCAA Tournament, Second Round
- Conference: Atlantic Coast Conference
- U. Soc. Coaches poll: No. RV
- Record: 8–6–5 (4–4–2 ACC)
- Head coach: Eddie Radwanski (15th season)
- Associate head coach: Jeff Robbins (15th season)
- Assistant coaches: Siri Mullinix (15th season); Maryanne Kilgore (1st season)
- Home stadium: Riggs Field

2025 ACC women's soccer standings
	Conf.						Overall
Team	W		L		T	PCT	W		L		T	PCT
No. 2 Stanford ‍†‍‡‍^{y}	9	–	0	–	1	.950	21	–	2	–	2	.880
No. 11 Notre Dame ‍‍‍^{y}	8	–	1	–	1	.850	15	–	2	–	3	.825
No. 3 Duke ‍‍‍^{y}	7	–	3	–	0	.700	17	–	5	–	1	.761
No. 1 Florida State ‍‍‍^{y}	6	–	2	–	2	.700	16	–	2	–	4	.818
No. 8 Virginia ‍‍‍^{y}	6	–	2	–	2	.700	14	–	3	–	5	.750
No. 24 Louisville ‍‍‍^{y}	6	–	2	–	2	.700	13	–	5	–	3	.690
No. 13т North Carolina ‍‍‍^{y}	6	–	4	–	0	.600	13	–	6	–	2	.667
California ‍‍‍	4	–	2	–	4	.600	8	–	3	–	8	.632
Wake Forest ‍‍‍^{y}	4	–	3	–	3	.550	11	–	5	–	4	.650
NC State ‍‍‍	4	–	4	–	2	.500	5	–	9	–	4	.389
Clemson ‍‍‍^{y}	4	–	4	–	2	.500	8	–	6	–	5	.553
SMU ‍‍‍	2	–	6	–	2	.300	8	–	8	–	2	.500
Pittsburgh ‍‍‍	2	–	8	–	0	.200	6	–	10	–	2	.389
Miami (FL) ‍‍‍	1	–	7	–	2	.200	7	–	8	–	3	.472
Boston College ‍‍‍	1	–	7	–	2	.200	5	–	8	–	5	.417
Syracuse ‍‍‍	1	–	8	–	1	.150	5	–	9	–	4	.389
Virginia Tech ‍‍‍	0	–	8	–	2	.100	4	–	10	–	4	.333
† – Conference champion ‡ – 2025 ACC Tournament champion y – Invited to the NCAA Tournament; As of December 9, 2025; Rankings from United Soccer Coaches Poll; Source: The ACC

The 2025 Clemson Tigers women's soccer team represented Clemson University during the 2025 NCAA Division I women's soccer season. The Tigers were led by head coach Ed Radwanski, in his fifteenth season. The Tigers home games were played at Riggs Field in Clemson, South Carolina. This was the team's 32nd season playing organized soccer, and all of those seasons were played in the Atlantic Coast Conference.

The Tigers began the season with a trip to Ohio to play eighteenth ranked Ohio State and Ohio. They defeated Ohio and drew with Ohio State. They then faced fifteenth-ranked Virginia Tech in a non-conference match. They lost 0–4. They then played their third ranked match in their first four, drawing a rivalry match with twelfth-ranked South Carolina 0–0. They won their next two games against non-Power 4 opponents before drawing 1–1 against fifteenth-ranked Georgia to finish their non-conference slate. The Tigers began their ACC slate with the California teams visiting Riggs Field. Both matches ended in 2–2 draws, one against third-ranked Stanford and the other against California. The Tigers then went on a three-match losing streak, which included losses to top-ranked Virginia and second-ranked Notre Dame. Their schedule became a bit easier as they won their next four straight ACC games. Only one of those games was a ranked win, a victory over seventeenth-ranked Wake Forest. They finished the ACC season making their first appearance in the rankings, at twenty-fifth. They faced tenth-ranked Duke and lost 2–3.

The Tigers finished the season 8–6–5 overall and 4–4–2 in ACC play to finish in tie for tenth place. They did not qualify for the ACC Tournament and received an at-large invitation to the NCAA Tournament. They were seeded eighth in the Vanderbilt Region. They defeated Liberty in the First Round, before falling to first seed and eighth-ranked Vanderbilt in overtime in the Second Round.

== Previous season ==
The Tigers finished the season 6–8–3 overall and 2–7–1 in ACC play to finish in fourteenth place. They did not qualify for the ACC Tournament and were not invited to the NCAA Tournament. Their six overall wins were the lowest since 2012 and tied for the lowest in the time since Radwanski has been head coach. Their two conference wins were also the lowest since 2012. By not earning an invite to the NCAA tournament, they broke a streak of qualifying for ten consecutive tournaments.

== Offseason ==
=== Departures ===
Departures
Name	Number	Pos.	Height	Year	Hometown	Reason for departure
Layne St. George	3	DF	5'5"	Senior	Seattle, Washington	Graduated
Elenor Hays	6	DF	5'9"	Sophomore	Lewisville, Texas	Transferred to Texas Tech
Sydney Minarik	12	DF	5'4"	Senior	Huntersville, North Carolina	Graduated
Kam Pickett	13	DF	5'0"	Graduate Student	Santa Barbara, California	Graduated
Ella Hauser	16	MF	5'6"	Senior	Cornelius, North Carolina	Graduated
Anna Rydin	19	DF	6'0"	Freshman	Chapel Hill, North Carolina	Transferred to Gonzaga
Emilia Eriksen	21	DF	5'7"	Freshman	Los Gatos, California	Transferred to Florida
Allie Serlenga	23	FW	5'7"	Freshman	Mount Laurel, New Jersey	Transferred to Miami (FL)
Megan Bornkamp	24	FW	5'9"	Graduate Student	Mooresville, North Carolina	Graduated
Dani Lynch	25	DF	5'8"	Sophomore	Los Angeles, California	—
Ally Lynch	34	GK	5'8"	Senior	Los Angeles, California	Graduated, transferred to Purdue

=== Incoming transfers ===
Incoming transfers
Name	Number	Pos.	Height	Year	Hometown	Previous school
Baleigh Bruster	14	DF	5'7"	Graduate Student	Atlanta, Georgia	Duke

=== Recruiting class ===
Name	Nationality	Hometown	Club	TDS Rating
Elle Bissinger; DF	(United States)	Greenville, South Carolina	Carolina Elite (ECNL)	4/5 stars
Maddie Costello; DF	(United States)	Stony Brook, New York	SUSA FC Academy	4/5 stars
JuJu Harris; FW	(United States)	Pembroke Pines, Florida	Florida United SC	4/5 stars
Jolie Jenkins; DF	(United States)	Winchester, Virginia	Virginia Development Academy	4/5 stars
Neely Kerr; MF	(United States)	Buford, Georgia	Tophat SC	4/5 stars
Reese Klein; DF	(United States)	Cooper City, Florida	Florida United SC	4/5 stars
Taylor Leib; MF	(United States)	Birmingham, Alabama	Alabama FC	3/5 stars
Madeline Parrott; GK	(United States)	Canton, Massachusetts	Scorpions SC	3/5 stars
Carla Small; DF	(United States)	Waipahu, Hawaii	IMG Academy	4/5 stars
Alessandra Washington; FW	(United States)	Brookhaven, Georgia	Concorde Fire SC	3/5 stars

== Squad ==
=== Roster ===
As of January 26, 2026

Note: Flags indicate national team as defined under FIFA eligibility rules; some limited exceptions apply. Players may hold more than one non-FIFA nationality.

No.	Pos.	Nation	Player
1	GK	USA	Nona Reason
2	MF	USA	Kendall Bodak
3	DF	USA	Maddie Costello
4	MF	USA	Neely Kerr
5	MF	ENG	Emily Brough
7	MF	USA	Dani Davis
8	FW	USA	Jenna Tobia
9	DF	USA	Mackenzie Duff
10	FW	USA	Renee Lyles
11	FW	USA	Tatum Short
12	FW	USA	Natalie Brooks
14	DF	USA	Baleigh Bruster
15	FW	USA	Ella Johnson
16	FW	USA	Jolie Jenkins

No.	Pos.	Nation	Player
17	MF	USA	Anna Castenfelt
18	FW	USA	Maria Manousos
19	FW	USA	JuJu Harris
20	MF	USA	Taylor Leib
21	MF	USA	Carla Small
22	MF	USA	Gabby Gambino
24	DF	USA	Reese Klein
25	DF	USA	Elle Bissinger
26	GK	USA	Addy Holgorsen
27	MF	USA	Erin Sherden
28	MF	USA	Alessandra Washington
29	FW	USA	Jordan Thompson
30	MF	USA	Christian Brathwaite
34	GK	USA	Maddie Parrott

=== Team management ===
Position	Staff
Athletic Director	(United States) Graham Neff
Head coach	(United States) Eddie Radwanski
Associate head coach	(United States) Jeff Robbins
Assistant coach	(United States) Siri Mullinix
Assistant Coach	(United States) Maryanne Kilgore
Director of Operations	(United States) Ewan Seabrook

== Schedule ==
Date Time, TV	Rank^{#}	Opponent^{#}	Result	Record	Site City, State
Exhibition
August 4*; 11:00 a.m.		Alabama	None Reported	–	Riggs Field; Clemson, SC
August 9*; 12:00 p.m.		at Tennessee	None Reported	–	Regal Soccer Stadium; Knoxville, TN
Non-conference regular season
August 14*; 7:00 p.m., B1G+		at No. 18 Ohio State	T 1–1	0–0–1	Jesse Owens Memorial Stadium (614); Columbus, OH
August 17*; 12:30 p.m., ESPN+		at Ohio	W 1–0	1–0–1	Chessa Field (382); Athens, OH
August 21*; 8:30 p.m., ACCNX		at No. 15 Virginia Tech	L 0–4	1–1–1	Thompson Field (1,047); Blacksburg, VA
August 28*; 7:00 p.m., ACCNX		No. 12 South Carolina; Rivalry	T 0–0	1–1–2	Riggs Field (1,043); Clemson, SC
August 31*; 7:00 p.m., ACCNX		Appalachian State	W 3–0	2–1–2	Riggs Field (367); Clemson, SC
September 4*; 7:00 p.m., ACCNX		Charlotte	W 2–0	3–1–2	Riggs Field (333); Clemson, SC
September 7*; 6:00 p.m., ACCNX		No. 15 Georgia	T 1–1	3–1–3	Riggs Field (700); Clemson, SC
ACC regular season
September 11; 6:00 p.m., ACCN		No. 3 Stanford	T 2–2	3–1–4 (0–0–1)	Riggs Field (315); Clemson, SC
September 14; 1:00 p.m., ACCN		California	T 2–2	3–1–5 (0–0–2)	Riggs Field (444); Clemson, SC
September 19; 7:00 p.m., ACCNX		at Louisville	L 0–1	3–2–5 (0–1–2)	Lynn Stadium (200); Louisville, KY
September 25; 7:00 p.m., ACCNX		No. 1 Virginia	L 0–3	3–3–5 (0–2–2)	Riggs Field (297); Clemson, SC
September 28; 6:00 p.m., ACCN		No. 2 Notre Dame	L 1–5	3–4–5 (0–3–2)	Riggs Field (867); Clemson, SC
October 5; 1:00 p.m., ACCNX		at Syracuse	W 2–1	4–4–5 (1–3–2)	SU Soccer Stadium (330); Syracuse, NY
October 9; 7:00 p.m., ACCNX		at SMU	W 3–2	5–4–5 (2–3–2)	Washburne Stadium (1,402); University Park, TX
October 16; 7:00 p.m., ACCN		No. 17т Wake Forest	W 1–0	6–4–5 (3–3–2)	Riggs Field (735); Clemson, SC
October 24; 3:00 p.m., ACCNX		at Boston College	W 1–0	7–4–5 (4–3–2)	Newton Campus Soccer Field (310); Chestnut Hill, MA
October 30; 7:00 p.m., ACCNX	No. 25	at No. 10 Duke	L 2–3	7–5–5 (4–4–2)	Koskinen Stadium (646); Durham, NC
NCAA Tournament
November 14*; 6:00 p.m., ESPN+	(8) No. 24	Liberty; First Round	W 2–1	8–5–5	Riggs Field (962); Clemson, SC
November 21 (Note: Originally schedule for November 20, but delayed due to inclement weather)*; 7:00 p.m., ESPN+	(8) No. 24	at (1) No. 8 Vanderbilt; Second Round	L 2–3 ^{2OT}	8–6–5	Vanderbilt Soccer Complex (635); Nashville, TN
*Non-conference game. ^{#}Rankings from United Soccer Coaches. (#) Tournament seedings in parentheses. All times are in Eastern.

== Goals record ==
Rank	No.	Nat.	Po.	Name	Regular season	NCAA Tournament	Total
1	19	(United States)	FW	JuJu Harris	7	0	7
2	10	(United States)	MF	Renee Lyles	3	1	4
2	17	(United States)	MF	Anna Castenfelt	3	1	4
4	20	(United States)	MF	Taylor Leib	2	1	3
4	25	(United States)	DF	Elle Bissinger	2	1	3
6	11	(United States)	FW	Tatum Short	2	0	2
7	5	(England)	MF	Emily Brough	1	0	1
7	12	(United States)	FW	Natalie Brooks	1	0	1
7	28	(United States)	MF	Alessandra Washington	1	0	1
Total					22	4	26

== Disciplinary record ==
Rank	No.	Nat.	Po.	Name	Regular Season			NCAA Tournament			Total		
Rank	No.	Nat.	Po.	Name	Booked	(yellow card) (yellow-red card)	Sent off (straight red)	Booked	(yellow card) (yellow-red card)	Sent off (straight red)	Booked	(yellow card) (yellow-red card)	Sent off (straight red)
1	4	(United States)	MF	Neely Keer	3	0	0	0	0	0	3	0	0
2	10	(United States)	MF	Renee Lyles	1	0	0	1	0	0	2	0	0
2	16	(United States)	FW	Jolie Jenkins	2	0	0	0	0	0	2	0	0
4	2	(United States)	MF	Kendall Bodak	1	0	0	0	0	0	1	0	0
4	7	(United States)	MF	Dani Davis	1	0	0	0	0	0	1	0	0
4	9	(United States)	DF	Mackenzie Duff	1	0	0	0	0	0	1	0	0
4	11	(United States)	FW	Tatum Short	0	0	0	1	0	0	1	0	0
4	14	(United States)	DF	Baleigh Bruster	1	0	0	0	0	0	1	0	0
4	19	(United States)	FW	JuJu Harris	1	0	0	0	0	0	1	0	0
4	30	(United States)	MF	Christian Brathwaite	1	0	0	0	0	0	1	0	0
Total					12	0	0	2	0	0	14	0	0

== Awards and honors ==
Recipient	Award	Date	Ref.
Jolie Jenkins	Top Drawer Soccer Preseason Best XI Freshman Team	August 12	
Juju Harris	All-ACC Third Team	November 5	
Juju Harris	ACC All-Freshman Team	November 5	

== Rankings ==
Ranking movements Legend: ██ Increase in ranking ██ Decrease in ranking — = Not ranked RV = Received votes
	Week																
Poll	Pre	1	2	3	4	5	6	7	8	9	10	11	12	13	14	15	Final
United Soccer	RV	RV	—	RV	RV	RV	—	—	—	—	RV	25	24	Not released			RV
TopDrawer Soccer	—	—	—	—	—	—	—	—	—	—	—	—	—	—	—	—	—
