= 2025 Louisville Cardinals women's soccer team =

2025 Louisville Cardinals women's soccer

NCAA Tournament, Second Round
- Conference: Atlantic Coast Conference
- U. Soc. Coaches poll: No. 24
- TopDrawerSoccer.com: No. 22
- Record: 13–5–3 (6–2–2 ACC)
- Head coach: Karen Ferguson-Dayes (26th season)
- Associate head coach: Hunter Norton (10th season)
- Assistant coach: Olivia Mills
- Home stadium: Lynn Stadium

2025 ACC women's soccer standings
	Conf.						Overall
Team	W		L		T	PCT	W		L		T	PCT
No. 2 Stanford ‍†‍‡‍^{y}	9	–	0	–	1	.950	21	–	2	–	2	.880
No. 11 Notre Dame ‍‍‍^{y}	8	–	1	–	1	.850	15	–	2	–	3	.825
No. 3 Duke ‍‍‍^{y}	7	–	3	–	0	.700	17	–	5	–	1	.761
No. 1 Florida State ‍‍‍^{y}	6	–	2	–	2	.700	16	–	2	–	4	.818
No. 8 Virginia ‍‍‍^{y}	6	–	2	–	2	.700	14	–	3	–	5	.750
No. 24 Louisville ‍‍‍^{y}	6	–	2	–	2	.700	13	–	5	–	3	.690
No. 13т North Carolina ‍‍‍^{y}	6	–	4	–	0	.600	13	–	6	–	2	.667
California ‍‍‍	4	–	2	–	4	.600	8	–	3	–	8	.632
Wake Forest ‍‍‍^{y}	4	–	3	–	3	.550	11	–	5	–	4	.650
NC State ‍‍‍	4	–	4	–	2	.500	5	–	9	–	4	.389
Clemson ‍‍‍^{y}	4	–	4	–	2	.500	8	–	6	–	5	.553
SMU ‍‍‍	2	–	6	–	2	.300	8	–	8	–	2	.500
Pittsburgh ‍‍‍	2	–	8	–	0	.200	6	–	10	–	2	.389
Miami (FL) ‍‍‍	1	–	7	–	2	.200	7	–	8	–	3	.472
Boston College ‍‍‍	1	–	7	–	2	.200	5	–	8	–	5	.417
Syracuse ‍‍‍	1	–	8	–	1	.150	5	–	9	–	4	.389
Virginia Tech ‍‍‍	0	–	8	–	2	.100	4	–	10	–	4	.333
† – Conference champion ‡ – 2025 ACC Tournament champion y – Invited to the NCAA Tournament; As of December 9, 2025; Rankings from United Soccer Coaches Poll; Source: The ACC

The 2025 Louisville Cardinals women's soccer team represented the University of Louisville during the 2025 NCAA Division I women's soccer season. The Cardinals were led by head coach Karen Ferguson-Dayes, in her twenty-sixth season. They played home games at Lynn Stadium in Louisville, Kentucky. This was the team's 41st season playing organized women's college soccer and their 12th playing in the Atlantic Coast Conference.

The Cardinals began the season with an SEC road trip where. they faced Auburn and 17th ranked Vanderbilt. They defeated Auburn 1–0 and lost to Vanderbilt 0–2. They did not play another Power 4 opponent for the rest of the non-conference season. They only allowed two goals over their next six games, and won them all. They scored seven goals or more in four of those six games. Their winning streak was broken when they opened ACC play against 7th ranked Florida State. They went on to win their next three games, all without allowing a goal, against Virginia Tech, Clemson, and Miami. They went 1–1–2 over their next four games, defeating Boston College, drawing with 3rd ranked Virginia and 13th ranked Wake Forest and losing to 2nd ranked Notre Dame. At the end of that run, they entered the United Soccer Coaches rankings at 20th. They finished their ACC regular season defeating NC State and SMU, both by a 3–0 score line.

The Cardinals finished the season 13–5–3 overall and 6–2–2 in ACC play to finish in a three-way tie for fourth place. They lost the tiebreaker and the sixth seed for the ACC Tournament. There, they fell to third seed and 10th ranked Duke in the first round, 1–0. They received an at-large bid to the NCAA Tournament and were the sixth seed in the Virginia Bracket. They advanced over rival Kentucky in a penalty shoot-out in the first round. They fell to third seed Kansas in the second round to end their season. Their thirteen overall wins were the highest since 2019, and their six ACC wins were the highest since 2018.

== Previous season ==
The Cardinals finished the season 7–6–5 overall and 2–5–3 in ACC play to finish in twelfth place. The team did not qualify for the ACC Tournament and were not invited to the NCAA Tournament.

== Offseason ==
=== Departures ===
Departures
Name	Number	Pos.	Height	Year	Hometown	Reason for departure
Jolie St. Louis	4	FW	5'9"	Senior	Atlanta, Georgia	Graduated
Piper Davidson	6	FW	5'5"	Freshman	Wenatchee, Washington	Transferred to Gonzaga
Amber Jackson	7	FW	5'6"	Graduate student	Janesville, California	Graduated
Maya Maxwell	8	MF	5'3"	Junior	Louisville, Kentucky	Transferred to FIU
Molly Cochran	9	MF	5'8"	Sophomore	Madeira, Ohio	Transferred to Cincinnati
Lauryn Contini	10	MF	5'5"	Freshman	New Philadelphia, Ohio	Transferred to Dayton
Avery Oergel	12	DF	5'5"	Freshman	Fulton, Maryland	Transferred to Indiana State
Ava Nielsen	13	MF	5'5"	Senior	Malverne, New York	Graduated
Berkley Patterson	15	MF	5'6"	Sophomore	Austin, Texas	—
Viktoria Wik	18	MF	5'4"	Sophomore	Roskilde, Denmark	Signed professional contract with F.C. Copenhagen
Gianna Angelillo	21	MF	5'6"	Sophomore	Glastonbury, Connecticut	Transferred to Seton Hall
Ella Kane	23	FW	5'5"	Sophomore	Macomb, Michigan	Transferred to Bowling Green
Brooke Dardano	28	MF	5'6"	Senior	Crestwood, Kentucky	Graduated; transferred to Vanderbilt

=== Incoming transfers ===
Incoming transfers
Name	Number	Pos.	Height	Year	Hometown	Previous school
Liza Suydam	4	DF	5'9"	Junior	Wadsworth, Ohio	Monmouth

=== Recruiting class ===
Name	Nationality	Hometown	Club	TDS rating
Gabrielle Baker; GK	(United States)	Hillsborough, New Jersey	PDA	4/5 stars
Ella Bard; MF	(United States)	Wadsworth, Ohio	Internationals SC (OH)	3/5 stars
Ellie Hill; FW	(United States)	St. Leon, Indiana	Indy Premier Soccer Club	3/5 stars
Ashlyn Huie; FW	(United States)	Roswell, Georgia	Atlanta Fire SA	3/5 stars
Nicole Jodoin; FW	(United States)	West Boylston, Massachusetts	FC Stars of Massachusetts	3/5 stars
Taylor Morris; FW	(United States)	Louisville, Kentucky	Racing Louisville FC Academy	3/5 stars
Trista Morris; DF	(United States)	Louisville, Kentucky	Racing Louisville FC Academy	3/5 stars
Karina Peat; FW	(United States)	Wilmington, North Carolina	Wilmington Hammerheads FC	4/5 stars
Kiley Peat; MF	(United States)	Wilmington, North Carolina	Wilmington Hammerheads FC	3/5 stars
Taylor Wilson; FW	(United States)	Germantown, Maryland	Northern Virginia Alliance	3/5 stars

== Squad ==
=== Roster ===
As of February 4, 2026

Note: Flags indicate national team as defined under FIFA eligibility rules; some limited exceptions apply. Players may hold more than one non-FIFA nationality.

No.	Pos.	Nation	Player
0	GK	USA	Brielle Baker
1	GK	USA	Kailey Kimball
2	MF	USA	Betsy Huckaby
3	FW	USA	Mackenzie Geigle
4	MF	USA	Liza Suydam
5	FW	USA	Grace Maddox
6	DF	USA	Taylor Wilson
7	FW	USA	Nicole Jodoin
9	FW	USA	Ellie Hill
10	FW	USA	Karina Peat
11	MF	USA	Amelia Swinarski
13	DF	USA	Kiley Peat
14	MF	USA	Lizzie Sexton

No.	Pos.	Nation	Player
17	DF	USA	Brooklyn Lee
20	FW	USA	Fina Davy
21	MF	USA	Ella Bard
22	DF	USA	Karsyn Cherry
24	MF	USA	AG Gibson
25	DF	USA	Hadley Snyder
26	MF	USA	Emma Kate Schroll
27	FW	USA	Emersen Jennings
28	FW	USA	Ashlyn Huie
30	GK	USA	Erynn Floyd
68	DF	USA	Trista Morris
86	FW	USA	Taylor Morris

=== Team management ===
Position	Staff
Karen Ferguson-Dayes	Head coach
Hunter Norton	Associate head coach
Olivia Mills	Assistant coach
Jing Hughley	Director of operations

== Schedule ==
Date Time, TV	Rank^{#}	Opponent^{#}	Result	Record	Site (Attendance) City, State
Non-conference regular season
August 14*; 7:00 p.m., SECN+		at Auburn	W 1–0	1–0–0	Auburn Soccer Complex (761); Auburn, AL
August 17*; 1:00 p.m., SECN+		at No. 17 Vanderbilt	L 0–2	1–1–0	Vanderbilt Soccer Complex (570); Nashville, TN
August 21*; 7:30 p.m., ACCNX		Detroit Mercy	W 8–0	2–1–0	Lynn Stadium (640); Louisville, KY
August 24*; 7:00 p.m., ACCNX		Wright State	W 7–2	3–1–0	Lynn Stadium (250); Louisville, KY
August 28*; 3:00 p.m., ACCNX		USC Upstate	W 9–0	4–1–0	Lynn Stadium (200); Louisville, KY
August 31*; 7:30 p.m., ACCNX		Coastal Carolina	W 2–0	5–1–0	Lynn Stadium (350); Louisville, KY
September 4*; 7:00 p.m., ACCNX		Kent State	W 8–0	6–1–0	Lynn Stadium (250); Louisville, KY
September 7*; 7:00 p.m., ACCNX		Dayton	W 2–0	7–1–0	Lynn Stadium (250); Louisville, KY
ACC regular season
September 11; 7:00 p.m., ACCNX		at No. 7 Florida State	L 0–2	7–2–0 (0–1–0)	Seminole Soccer Complex (1,330); Tallahassee, FL
September 14; 1:00 p.m., ACCNX		Virginia Tech	W 1–0	8–2–0 (1–1–0)	Lynn Stadium (200); Louisville, KY
September 19; 7:00 p.m., ACCNX		Clemson	W 1–0	9–2–0 (2–1–0)	Lynn Stadium (200); Louisville, KY
September 25; 7:00 p.m., ACCNX		Miami (FL)	W 2–0	10–2–0 (3–1–0)	Lynn Stadium (300); Louisville, KY
October 3; 7:00 p.m., ACCNX	No. 23	at No. 2 Notre Dame	L 1–3	10–3–0 (3–2–0)	Alumni Stadium (0); Notre Dame, IN
October 9; 7:00 p.m., ACCNX		at No. 13 Wake Forest	T 1–1	10–3–1 (3–2–1)	Spry Stadium (543); Winston-Salem, NC
October 12; 12:00 p.m., ACCNX		at Boston College	W 1–0	11–3–1 (4–2–1)	Newton Campus Soccer Field (359); Chestnut Hill, MA
October 18; 5:00 p.m., ACCNX		No. 3 Virginia	T 1–1	11–3–2 (4–2–2)	Lynn Stadium (550); Louisville, KY
October 23; 7:00 p.m., ACCNX	No. 20т	at NC State	W 3–0	12–3–2 (5–2–2)	Dail Soccer Field (372); Raleigh, NC
October 30; 7:00 p.m., ACCNX	No. 21	SMU	W 3–0	13–3–2 (6–2–2)	Lynn Stadium (300); Louisville, KY
ACC Tournament
November 2*; 6:00 p.m., ACCN	(6) No. 21	at (3) No. 10 Duke; First Round	L 0–1	13–4–2	Koskinen Stadium (377); Durham, NC
NCAA Tournament
November 15*; 2:00 p.m., ESPN+	(6) No. 20	Kentucky; First Round, Rivalry	T 1–1 (5–4 PKs) ^{2OT}	13–4–3	Lynn Stadium (1,016); Louisville, KY
November 20*; 4:00 p.m., ESPN+	(6) No. 20	vs. (3) Kansas; Second Round	L 1–3	13–5–3	Koskinen Stadium (882); Durham, NC
*Non-conference game. ^{#}Rankings from United Soccer Coaches. (#) Tournament seedings in parentheses.

== Awards and honors ==
Recipient	Award	Date	Ref.
Mackenzie Geigle	ACC Offensive Player of the Week – Week 2	August 26	
Amelia Swinarski	ACC Co-Offensive Player of the Week – Week 4	September 9	
Erynn Floyd	ACC Defensive Player of the Week – Week 11	October 28	
Karsyn Cherry	All-ACC Second Team	November 5	
Amelia Swinarski	All-ACC Second Team	November 5	
Emersen Jennings	All-ACC Third Team	November 5	

== Rankings ==
Ranking movements Legend: ██ Increase in ranking ██ Decrease in ranking — = Not ranked RV = Received votes т = Tied with team above or below
	Week																
Poll	Pre	1	2	3	4	5	6	7	8	9	10	11	12	13	14	15	Final
United Soccer	—	—	—	—	RV	RV	RV	23	RV	RV	20т	21	20	Not released			24
TopDrawer Soccer	—	—	—	—	20	22	14	10	11	15	16	14	15	20	19	22	22
