= 2025 Notre Dame Fighting Irish women's soccer team =

American college soccer season

2025 Notre Dame Fighting Irish women's soccer

NCAA Tournament, Second Round
- Conference: Atlantic Coast Conference
- U. Soc. Coaches poll: No. 11
- TopDrawerSoccer.com: No. 17
- Record: 15–2–3 (8–1–1 ACC)
- Head coach: Nate Norman (8th season)
- Associate head coach: Dawn Siergiej (23rd season)
- Assistant coaches: Martin Rennie (3rd season); Gina Lewandowski (1st season)
- Home stadium: Alumni Stadium

2025 ACC women's soccer standings
	Conf.						Overall
Team	W		L		T	PCT	W		L		T	PCT
No. 2 Stanford ‍†‍‡‍^{y}	9	–	0	–	1	.950	21	–	2	–	2	.880
No. 11 Notre Dame ‍‍‍^{y}	8	–	1	–	1	.850	15	–	2	–	3	.825
No. 3 Duke ‍‍‍^{y}	7	–	3	–	0	.700	17	–	5	–	1	.761
No. 1 Florida State ‍‍‍^{y}	6	–	2	–	2	.700	16	–	2	–	4	.818
No. 8 Virginia ‍‍‍^{y}	6	–	2	–	2	.700	14	–	3	–	5	.750
No. 24 Louisville ‍‍‍^{y}	6	–	2	–	2	.700	13	–	5	–	3	.690
No. 13т North Carolina ‍‍‍^{y}	6	–	4	–	0	.600	13	–	6	–	2	.667
California ‍‍‍	4	–	2	–	4	.600	8	–	3	–	8	.632
Wake Forest ‍‍‍^{y}	4	–	3	–	3	.550	11	–	5	–	4	.650
NC State ‍‍‍	4	–	4	–	2	.500	5	–	9	–	4	.389
Clemson ‍‍‍^{y}	4	–	4	–	2	.500	8	–	6	–	5	.553
SMU ‍‍‍	2	–	6	–	2	.300	8	–	8	–	2	.500
Pittsburgh ‍‍‍	2	–	8	–	0	.200	6	–	10	–	2	.389
Miami (FL) ‍‍‍	1	–	7	–	2	.200	7	–	8	–	3	.472
Boston College ‍‍‍	1	–	7	–	2	.200	5	–	8	–	5	.417
Syracuse ‍‍‍	1	–	8	–	1	.150	5	–	9	–	4	.389
Virginia Tech ‍‍‍	0	–	8	–	2	.100	4	–	10	–	4	.333
† – Conference champion ‡ – 2025 ACC Tournament champion y – Invited to the NCAA Tournament; As of December 9, 2025; Rankings from United Soccer Coaches Poll; Source: The ACC

The 2025 Notre Dame Fighting Irish women's soccer team represented the University of Notre Dame during the 2025 NCAA Division I women's soccer season. It was the 38th season of the university fielding a program and their twelfth competing in the Atlantic Coast Conference. The Fighting Irish were led by eighth year head coach Nate Norman, and played their home games at Alumni Stadium in Notre Dame, Indiana.

The Fighting Irish began the season ranked second in the United Soccer Coaches poll and won their opening match against Western Michigan 2–1, before drawing at sixth ranked Arkansas 2–2. Those results saw the team fall to seventh in the rankings. From there, Notre dame won its next four non-conference games, all without allowing a goal. They defeated two Big Ten foes Michigan and Michigan State over that run and advanced to sixth in the rankings to begin ACC play. The Fighting Irish won eight straight ACC matches. This run included victories over four ranked teams: third ranked Duke, fifth ranked Florida State, twenty-second ranked North Carolina, and twenty-third ranked Louisville. After defeating Duke, they rose to second in the rankings and would stay there until their seventh straight win. After that victory over SMU, they rose to the top spot. They would finish the ACC season with a draw at Wake Forest and a loss at Pittsburgh.

The Fighting Irish finished the regular season 13–1–2 overall and 8–1–1 in ACC play to finish in second place. As the second seed in the ACC Tournament, they earned a bye into the Semifinals where they defeated third seed and eleventh ranked Duke. They could not overcome top seed and top ranked Stanford in the Final, as they fell in a penalty shoot-out. They received an at-large bid to the NCAA Tournament, where they were the first-seed in the Notre Dame. They defeated UIC in the First Round before being upset by unranked and unseeded Ohio State in the Second Round in double overtime. They finished the season with a 15–2–3 overall record. Their ACC Tournament appearance extended their streak of qualification to seven straight years, and this was the fifth straight NCAA Tournament for the Fighting Irish.

== Previous season ==
The Fighting Irish finished 12–4–4 overall and 7–1–2 in ACC play to finish in second place. As the second seed in the ACC Tournament, they lost to third seed Florida State, in the First Round. They received an at-large bid to the NCAA Tournament, where they were the fourth-seed in the Mississippi State Bracket. They defeated Milwaukee in the First Round, fifth seed Kentucky in the Second Round, and first seed Mississippi State in the Round of 16. Their quarterfinal opponent was Stanford, who they defeated in the regular season. Ultimately, Stanford prevailed in the tournament 2–0. Their ACC Tournament appearance extended their streak of qualification to six straight years, and this was the fourth straight NCAA Tournament for the Fighting Irish.

== Offseason ==
=== Departures ===
Departures
Name	Number	Pos.	Height	Year	Hometown	Reason for departure
Atlee Olofson	1	GK	5'8"	Sophomore	Austin, Texas	Transferred to Miami (FL)
Ellie Ospeck	5	MF/FW	5'4"	Graduate Student	Danville, California	Graduated
KJ Ronan	8	DF	5'8"	Senior	Carlsbad, California	Graduated
Sophia Fisher	11	MF	5'8"	Senior	Scottsdale, Arizona	Graduated
Abby Gemma	14	DF	5'9"	Freshman	Flemington, New Jersey	Transferred to Florida
Reagan Pauwels	25	MF	5'6"	Graduate Student	Wall, New Jersey	Graduated
Katherine Montgomery	31	GK	5'7"	Graduate Student	Geneva, Illinois	Graduated

=== Incoming transfers ===
Incoming transfers
Name	Number	Pos.	Height	Year	Hometown	Previous school
Carolyn Calzada	5	DF	5'10"	Graduate Student	Houston, Texas	Texas A&M
Madeleine Agee	33	GK	5'9"	Sophomore	Houston, Texas	Holy Cross

=== Recruiting class ===
Name	Nationality	Hometown	Club	TDS Rating
Tessa Knapp; FW	(United States)	Bay Village, Ohio	Internationals SC (OH)	4/5 stars
Alessia Saia; FW	(United States)	Delray Beach, Florida	FC Prime	3/5 stars
Gianna Scott; FW	(United States)	Avon, Ohio	Cleveland Force FC	3/5 stars

== Squad ==
=== Roster ===
As of February 11, 2026

Note: Flags indicate national team as defined under FIFA eligibility rules; some limited exceptions apply. Players may hold more than one non-FIFA nationality.

No.	Pos.	Nation	Player
0	GK	USA	Jackie Hollomon
2	DF	CAN	Clare Logan
3	MF	USA	Izzy Engle
4	DF	USA	Leah Klenke
5	DF	USA	Carolyn Calzada
6	FW	USA	Paige Buchner
7	FW	CAN	Annabelle Chukwu
8	MF	USA	Alessia Saia
9	FW	USA	Charlie Codd
10	MF	USA	Ellie Hodsden
11	FW	USA	Tessa Knapp
12	MF	USA	Kiki Turner
13	MF	USA	Laney Matriano
14	MF	USA	Gianna Scott
16	FW	USA	Meg Mrowicki

No.	Pos.	Nation	Player
17	MF	USA	Riley DeMartino
18	MF	USA	Berkley Mensik
19	MF	USA	Ally Pinto
20	MF	USA	Abby Mills
21	MF	PHI	Chayse Ying
22	DF	CAN	Tatiana Tagne
23	MF	USA	Morgan Roy
24	MF	USA	Grace Restovich
26	DF	USA	Melinda Hathaway
27	MF	USA	Lily Joseph
28	GK	USA	Sonoma Kasica
29	DF	USA	Rowan Pearl
30	MF	USA	Hannah Lemieux
33	GK	USA	Madeleine Agee
34	FW	USA	Randie Foor

== Team management ==
Position	Staff
Head coach	Nate Norman
Assistant Coach	Dawn Siergiej
Assistant Coach	Martin Rennie
Assistant Coach	Gina Lewandowski

== Schedule ==
Date Time, TV	Rank^{#}	Opponent^{#}	Result	Record	Site City, State
Exhibition
August 3*; 5:00 p.m.	No. 2	Northwestern	None Reported	–	Alumni Stadium; Notre Dame, IN
August 9*; 1:00 p.m.	No. 2	at Indiana	None Reported	–	Bill Armstrong Stadium; Bloomington, IN
Non-conference regular season
August 14*; 7:00 p.m., ACCNX	No. 2	Western Michigan	W 2–1	1–0–0	Alumni Stadium (532); Notre Dame, IN
August 17*; 7:30 p.m., SECN	No. 2	at No. 6 Arkansas	T 2–2	1–0–1	Razorback Field (2,947); Fayetteville, AR
August 21*; 7:00 p.m., ACCNX	No. 7т	Cincinnati	W 4–0	2–0–1	Alumni Stadium (570); Notre Dame, IN
August 28*; 6:00 p.m., ACCNX	No. 6т	Michigan	W 3–0	3–0–1	Alumni Stadium (605); Notre Dame, IN
August 31*; 6:00 p.m., ACCNX	No. 6т	Oakland	W 8–0	4–0–1	Alumni Stadium (477); Notre Dame, IN
September 4*; 7:00 p.m., BTN+	No. 5	at Michigan State	W 3–0	5–0–1	DeMartin Soccer Complex (2,214); East Lansing, MI
September 7*; 1:00 p.m., YouTube	No. 5	at Marquette	Canceled		Valley Fields; Milwaukee, WI
ACC regular season
September 11; 7:00 p.m., ACCNX	No. 6	at NC State	W 2–1	6–0–1 (1–0–0)	Dail Soccer Field (606); Raleigh, NC
September 18; 7:00 p.m., ACCNX	No. 6	No. 3 Duke	W 3–2	7–0–1 (2–0–0)	Alumni Stadium (1,277); Notre Dame, IN
September 24; 6:00 p.m., ACCN	No. 2	No. 22 North Carolina	W 4–3	8–0–1 (3–0–0)	Alumni Stadium (1,072); Notre Dame, IN
September 28; 6:00 p.m., ACCN	No. 2	at Clemson	W 5–1	9–0–1 (4–0–0)	Riggs Field (867); Clemson, SC
October 3; 6:00 p.m., ACCNX	No. 2	No. 23 Louisville	W 3–1	10–0–1 (5–0–0)	Alumni Stadium (0); Notre Dame, IN
October 9; 7:00 p.m., ACCN	No. 2	No. 5 Florida State	W 4–2	11–0–1 (6–0–0)	Alumni Stadium (1,156); Notre Dame, IN
October 12; 3:30 p.m., ACCN	No. 2	SMU	W 3–0	12–0–1 (7–0–0)	Alumni Stadium (1,573); Notre Dame, IN
October 23; 8:00 p.m., ACCN	No. 1	at Virginia Tech	W 5–0	13–0–1 (8–0–0)	Thompson Field (426); Blacksburg, VA
October 26; 2:00 p.m., ACCNX	No. 1	at Wake Forest	T 1–1	13–0–2 (8–0–1)	Spry Stadium (746); Winston-Salem, NC
October 30; 7:00 p.m., ACCNX	No. 1	at Pittsburgh	L 0–1	13–1–2 (8–1–1)	Ambrose Urbanic Field (468); Pittsburgh, PA
ACC Tournament
November 6*; 5:30 p.m., ACCN	(2) No. 2	vs. (3) No. 11 Duke; Semifinals	W 2–1	14–1–2	WakeMed Soccer Park (1,077); Cary, NC
November 9*; 12:00 p.m., ESPNU	(2) No. 2	vs. (1) No. 1 Stanford; Final	T 2–2 (4–5 PKs)	14–1–3	WakeMed Soccer Park (1,257); Cary, NC
NCAA Tournament
November 15*; 6:00 p.m., ESPN+	(1) No. 2	UIC; First Round	W 4–0	15–1–3	Alumni Stadium (1,296); Notre Dame, IN
November 20*; 6:00 p.m., ESPN+	(1) No. 2	Ohio State; Second Round	L 0–1 ^{2OT}	15–2–3	Alumni Stadium (1,009); Notre Dame, IN
*Non-conference game. ^{#}Rankings from United Soccer Coaches. (#) Tournament seedings in parentheses. All times are in Eastern.

== Awards and honors ==
Recipient	Award	Date	Ref.
Izzy Engle	Pre-season All-ACC Team	August 7	
Leah Klenke	Pre-season All-ACC Team	August 7	
Izzy Engle	Top Drawer Soccer Preseason Best XI First Team	August 12	
Leah Klenke	Top Drawer Soccer Preseason Best XI Second Team	August 12	
Izzy Engle	Hermann Trophy Preseason Watchlist	August 14	
Leah Klenke	Hermann Trophy Preseason Watchlist	August 14	
Laney Matriano	ACC Co-Offensive Player of the Week – Week 3	September 2	
Annabelle Chukwu	ACC Co-Offensive Player of the Week – Week 4	September 9	
Annabelle Chukwu	ACC Offensive Player of the Week – Week 6	September 23	
Izzy Engle	ACC Co-Offensive Player of the Week – Week 7	September 30	
Izzy Engle	ACC Co-Offensive Player of the Week – Week 11	October 28	
Izzy Engle	ACC Offensive Player of the Year	November 5	
Annabelle Chukwu	All-ACC First Team	November 5	
Izzy Engle	All-ACC First Team	November 5	
Leah Klenke	All-ACC First Team	November 5	
Grace Restovich	All-ACC Third Team	November 5	
Tessa Knapp	ACC All-Freshman Team	November 5	
Annabelle Chukwu	All-ACC Tournament Team	November 9	
Charlie Codd	All-ACC Tournament Team	November 9	
Izzy Engle	All-ACC Tournament Team	November 9	
Leah Klenke	All-ACC Tournament Team	November 9	

== Rankings ==
Ranking movements Legend: ██ Increase in ranking ██ Decrease in ranking т = Tied with team above or below ( ) = First-place votes
	Week																
Poll	Pre	1	2	3	4	5	6	7	8	9	10	11	12	13	14	15	Final
United Soccer	2	7т	6т	5	6	6	2	2	2	1 (8)	1 (8)	1 (8)	2	Not released			11
TopDrawer Soccer	3	8	6	5	1	1	1	1	1	1	1	2	2	2	2	17	17
