= 2025 SMU Mustangs women's soccer team =

American college soccer season

2025 SMU Mustangs women's soccer
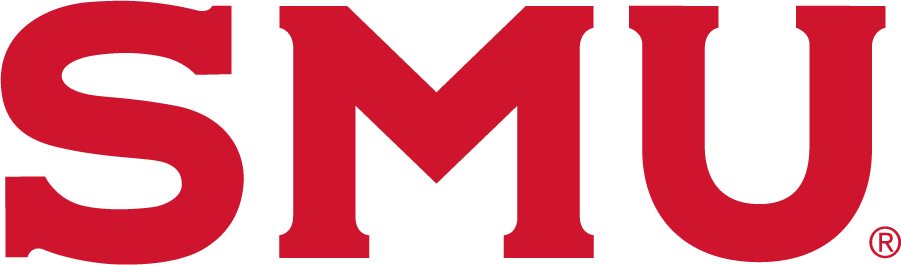
- Conference: Atlantic Coast Conference
- Record: 8–8–2 (2–6–2 ACC)
- Head coach: Nicole Nelson (4th season)
- Assistant coaches: Miles Vaughn (2nd season); Daniel O'Hare (1st season); Callie McKinney (1st season)
- Home stadium: Washburne Stadium

2025 ACC women's soccer standings
	Conf.						Overall
Team	W		L		T	PCT	W		L		T	PCT
No. 2 Stanford ‍†‍‡‍^{y}	9	–	0	–	1	.950	21	–	2	–	2	.880
No. 11 Notre Dame ‍‍‍^{y}	8	–	1	–	1	.850	15	–	2	–	3	.825
No. 3 Duke ‍‍‍^{y}	7	–	3	–	0	.700	17	–	5	–	1	.761
No. 1 Florida State ‍‍‍^{y}	6	–	2	–	2	.700	16	–	2	–	4	.818
No. 8 Virginia ‍‍‍^{y}	6	–	2	–	2	.700	14	–	3	–	5	.750
No. 24 Louisville ‍‍‍^{y}	6	–	2	–	2	.700	13	–	5	–	3	.690
No. 13т North Carolina ‍‍‍^{y}	6	–	4	–	0	.600	13	–	6	–	2	.667
California ‍‍‍	4	–	2	–	4	.600	8	–	3	–	8	.632
Wake Forest ‍‍‍^{y}	4	–	3	–	3	.550	11	–	5	–	4	.650
NC State ‍‍‍	4	–	4	–	2	.500	5	–	9	–	4	.389
Clemson ‍‍‍^{y}	4	–	4	–	2	.500	8	–	6	–	5	.553
SMU ‍‍‍	2	–	6	–	2	.300	8	–	8	–	2	.500
Pittsburgh ‍‍‍	2	–	8	–	0	.200	6	–	10	–	2	.389
Miami (FL) ‍‍‍	1	–	7	–	2	.200	7	–	8	–	3	.472
Boston College ‍‍‍	1	–	7	–	2	.200	5	–	8	–	5	.417
Syracuse ‍‍‍	1	–	8	–	1	.150	5	–	9	–	4	.389
Virginia Tech ‍‍‍	0	–	8	–	2	.100	4	–	10	–	4	.333
† – Conference champion ‡ – 2025 ACC Tournament champion y – Invited to the NCAA Tournament; As of December 9, 2025; Rankings from United Soccer Coaches Poll; Source: The ACC

The 2025 SMU Mustangs women's soccer team represented Southern Methodist University during the 2025 NCAA Division I women's soccer season. The Mustangs were led by head coach Nicole Nelson, in her fourth season. They played their home games at Washburne Stadium in Dallas, Texas. This was the team's 32nd season playing organized women's college soccer and their 2nd playing in the Atlantic Coast Conference.

The Mustangs started off their season with a non-conference match against tenth-ranked Wake Forest, which they lost 2–0. They then went on a three-match winning streak before losing to the next Power 4 team they faced, Texas Tech, again 2–0. They defeated two non-Power 4 teams before opening the ACC season with a draw at Syracuse 1–1. They defeated Alcorn State 1–0 to finish their non-conference season. Their next string of games proved to be a bright spot where the team went 2–1–1. They defeated Pittsburgh and California, drew against Miami (FL) and lost to NC State. The team couldn't keep that form through the end of the season as they lost their final five ACC matches. Four of the five matches were against ranked teams. During the span the Mustangs lost to second ranked Notre Dame and Stanford, twenty-third ranked North Carolina and they ended the season against twenty-first ranked Louisville.

The Mustangs finished the season 8–8–2 overall and 2–6–2 in ACC play to finish in twelfth place. The team did not qualify for the ACC Tournament and were not invited to the NCAA Tournament. Their eight overall wins were an improvement from the previous season, but still the team's lowest since 2015, with the exception of a shortened 2020 season. This is the second straight year they have finished 2–6–2 in ACC play.

== Previous season ==
The Mustangs finished the season 6–9–2 overall and 2–6–2 in ACC play to finish in thirteenth place. They did not qualify for the ACC Tournament and were not invited to the NCAA Tournament. Their six overall wins were the lowest since 2015, with the exception of a shortened 2020 season.

== Offseason ==
=== Departures ===
Departures
Name	Number	Pos.	Height	Year	Hometown	Reason for departure
Mackenzie Rudden	8	MF	5'5"	Graduate Student	Phoenix, Arizona	Graduated
Eliana Salama	9	FW	5'3"	Junior	Pembroke Pines, Florida	Transferred to Virginia Tech
Addison Vali	11	MF	5'9"	Sophomore	Highlands Ranch, Colorado	Transferred to Grand Canyon
Nanami Hata	13	DF/MF	5'6"	Junior	Shizuoka, Japan	Transferred to Tulsa
Tori Peterson	17	DF/MF	5'7"	Junior	Las Vegas, Nevada	—
Lou Brossault	20	MF	5'6"	Junior	Rennes, France	Transferred to Marshall
Sadie Paul	21	FW	5'8"	Freshman	Fort Worth, Texas	Transferred to TCU
Emma Alvord	24	FW	5'8"	Sophomore	Argyle, Texas	Transferred to Oklahoma State
Sophie King	25	DF	5'3"	Senior	Austin, Texas	Graduated
Layla Garcia-Moreno	26	MF	5'6"	Junior	Angamacutiro, Mexico	Transferred to Jacksonville
Abby Hampton	27	DF	5'11"	Senior	Newport Beach, California	Graduated
Bella Burr	28	MF	5'3"	Sophomore	Virginia Beach, Virginia	Transferred to High Point
Sierra Cota-Yarde	30	GK	5'11"	Graduate Student	Toronto, Canada	Graduated; signed professional contract with AFC Toronto
Hayden Halscheid	35	FW/MF	5'6"	Sophomore	London, England	Transferred to UC Santa Barbara

=== Incoming transfers ===
Incoming transfers
Name	Number	Pos.	Height	Year	Hometown	Previous school
Sydney Japic	7	DF/MF	5'9"	Senior	Palo Alto, California	Alabama
Sarah Bonnecaze	8	MF	5'6"	Sophomore	Baton Rouge, Louisiana	TCU
Zoe Parkhurst	11	MF	5'8"	Junior	Menlo Park, California	Oklahoma
Claire Jones	25	DF	5'6"	Junior	Ridgefield, Washington	Oregon State

=== Recruiting class ===
Name	Nationality	Hometown	Club	TDS Rating
Brooke Bunton; MF	(United States)	Green Cove Springs, Florida	Jacksonville FC	4/5 stars
Savannah Chenail; DF	(Canada)	Montreal, Canada	Montreal Roses FC	N/A
Libby Jannereth; MF	(United States)	Allen, Texas	Sting Dallas Black SC	3/5 stars
Julianna Millin; FW	(United States)	McAllen, Texas	Austin Sting	3/5 stars
Lindsay Nicholson; MF	(United States)	Palm Harbor, Florida	Tampa Bay Sun FC	3/5 stars

== Squad ==
=== Roster ===
As of January 10, 2026

Note: Flags indicate national team as defined under FIFA eligibility rules; some limited exceptions apply. Players may hold more than one non-FIFA nationality.

No.	Pos.	Nation	Player
1	GK	USA	Aubrey Brown
2	MF	USA	Kaya Lee
3	MF	JPN	Mayu Inokawa
4	DF	USA	Hali Hartman
5	FW	USA	Truth Byars
6	DF	USA	Sammy Nieves
7	DF	USA	Sydney Japic
8	MF	USA	Sarah Bonnecaze
9	FW	USA	Julianna Millin
10	MF	USA	Lindsay Nicholson
11	MF	USA	Zoe Parkhurst
12	DF	USA	Paxton Bock
13	MF	USA	Brooke Bunton

No.	Pos.	Nation	Player
14	FW	USA	Liz Eddy
15	MF	USA	Lydia Ungashick
16	MF	USA	Kelly Gordon
19	FW	CAN	Nyah Rose
21	DF	CAN	Savannah Chenail
22	MF	USA	Nicole Stryker
25	DF	USA	Claire Jones
29	MF	USA	Libby Jannereth
30	GK	USA	Jessi Curry
31	DF	USA	Paige Boeger
32	MF	USA	Maura Yumul
34	FW	USA	Jen Jackson
66	GK	USA	Haven Empey-Taylor

=== Team management ===
Position	Staff
Head coach	Nicole Nelson
Assistant Coach	Miles Vaughn
Assistant Coach	Daniel O'Hare
Assistant Coach	Callie McKinney
Director of Operations	Paula Woodbury

== Schedule ==
Date Time, TV	Rank^{#}	Opponent^{#}	Result	Record	Site (Attendance) City, State
Exhibition
August 2*; 7:00 p.m.		Dallas Trinity FC	None Reported	—	Washburne Stadium; Dallas, TX
Regular Season
August 14*; 6:00 p.m., ACCNX		at No. 10 Wake Forest	L 0–2	0–1–0	Spry Stadium (467); Winston-Salem, NC
August 17*; 7:00 p.m., ACCNX		Northwestern State	W 2–0	1–1–0	Washburne Stadium (450); Dallas, TX
August 21*; 7:00 p.m., ESPN+		at North Texas	W 4–3	2–1–0	Mean Green Soccer Stadium (1,172); Denton, TX
August 24*; 7:00 p.m., ACCNX		Southern	W 2–0	3–1–0	Washburne Stadium (407); Dallas, TX
August 28*; 7:00 p.m., ESPN+		at Texas Tech	L 0–2	3–2–0	John Walker Soccer Complex (1,026); Lubbock, TX
September 4*; 7:00 p.m., ACCNX		Houston Christian	W 3–0	4–2–0	Washburne Stadium (493); Dallas, TX
September 7*; 7:00 p.m., ACCNX		Sam Houston	W 3–1	5–2–0	Washburne Stadium (557); Dallas, TX
September 11; 6:00 p.m., ACCNX		at Syracuse	T 1–1	5–2–1 (0–0–1)	SU Soccer Stadium (265); Syracuse, NY
September 14*; 1:00 p.m., ACCNX		Alcorn State	W 1–0	6–2–1	Washburne Stadium (331); Dallas, TX
September 18; 6:00 p.m., ACCNX		NC State	L 0–1	6–3–1 (0–1–1)	Washburne Stadium (325); Dallas, TX
September 25; 6:00 p.m., ACCNX		at Pittsburgh	W 4–0	7–3–1 (1–1–1)	Ambrose Urbanic Field (261); Pittsburgh, PA
September 28; 1:00 p.m., ACCNX		Miami (FL)	T 0–0	7–3–2 (1–1–2)	Washburne Stadium (551); Dallas, TX
October 5; 1:00 p.m., ACCN		California	W 2–1	8–3–2 (2–1–2)	Washburne Stadium (544); Dallas, TX
October 9; 6:00 p.m., ACCNX		Clemson	L 2–3	8–4–2 (2–2–2)	Washburne Stadium (1,402); Dallas, TX
October 12; 2:30 p.m., ACCN		at No. 2 Notre Dame	L 0–3	8–5–2 (2–3–2)	Alumni Stadium (1,573); Notre Dame, IN
October 17; 5:00 p.m., ACCNX		No. 23 North Carolina	L 0–3	8–6–2 (2–4–2)	Washburne Stadium (2,036); Dallas, TX
October 25; 9:00 p.m., ACCNX		at No. 2 Stanford	L 1–5	8–7–2 (2–5–2)	Cagan Stadium (1,484); Stanford, CA
October 30; 6:00 p.m., ACCNX		at No. 21 Louisville	L 0–3	8–8–2 (2–6–2)	Lynn Stadium (300); Louisville, KY
*Non-conference game. ^{#}Rankings from United Soccer Coaches. (#) Tournament seedings in parentheses. All times are in Central.

== Rankings ==
Ranking movements Legend: — = Not ranked
	Week																
Poll	Pre	1	2	3	4	5	6	7	8	9	10	11	12	13	14	15	Final
United Soccer	—	—	—	—	—	—	—	—	—	—	—	—	—	Not released			—
TopDrawer Soccer	—	—	—	—	—	—	—	—	—	—	—	—	—	—	—	—	—
