= Edwards Stadium =

Stadium in Berkeley, California

Coordinates: 37°52′8.41″N 122°15′53.33″W

- Goldman Field
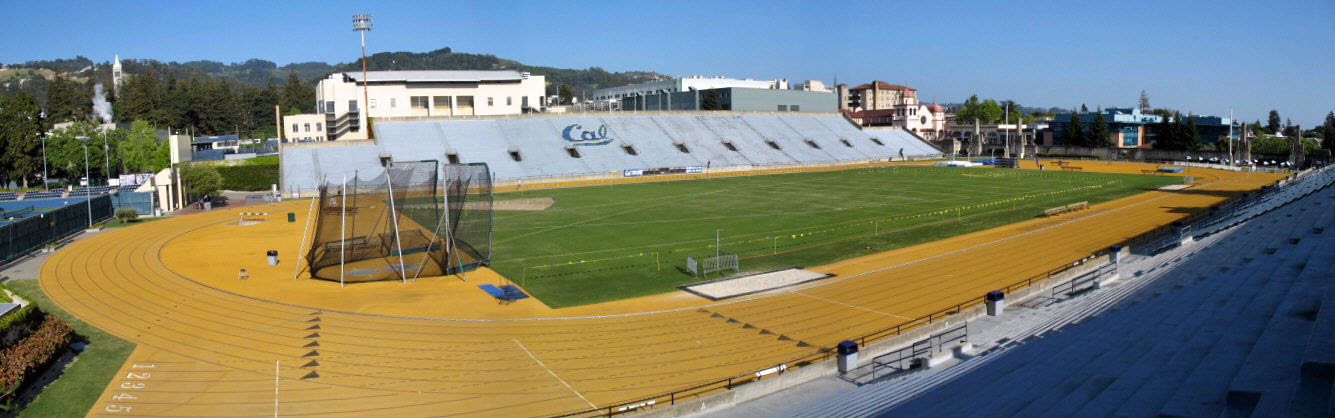
- View of the stadium in 2009
- Interactive map of Edwards Stadium
- Address: 2223 Fulton Street; Berkeley, CA; United States
- Owner: University of California, Berkeley
- Operator: Univ. of California Athletics
- Capacity: 22,000
- Type: Stadium
- Surface: Land
- Current use: Soccer; Track and field

Construction
- Opened: 1932; 94 years ago
- Architects: Warren C. Perry; George W. Kelham

Tenants
- California Golden Bears (NCAA) teams: Men's soccer; Women's soccer

Website
- calbears.com/edwards-stadium

Berkeley Landmark
- Designated: 1992

Edwards Stadium (also referred to as Edwards Field) is the track and field and soccer venue for the California Golden Bears, the athletic teams of the University of California, Berkeley. It has been a Berkeley Landmark (no. 177) since November 2, 1992, under the name "Edwards Stadium and Field".

== History ==
This Art Deco-styled stadium was designed by architects Warren C. Perry and George W. Kelham, and opened in 1932. It was named for mathematics professor George C. Edwards and was the oldest track-only stadium in the United States until 1999, when it was reconfigured to accommodate the Cal men's and women's soccer teams. It is located at 2223 Fulton Street on the southwest corner of the Berkeley campus, at the corner of Bancroft Way, and has a seating capacity of 22,000. From the stadium there are panoramic views of the Berkeley Hills and Strawberry Canyon to the east, and the San Francisco Bay, Golden Gate Bridge, and the San Francisco skyline to the west.

An invitational Cal Bears track meet is held annually at Edwards Stadium. It was renamed the Brutus Hamilton Memorial Invitational in 1998. The venue also hosted the NCAA Division I Men's Outdoor Track and Field Championships in 1935, 1937, 1952, 1956, 1958, 1960, 1965 and 1968. The venue has also hosted a National AAU championship, and the 1971 and '78 USA vs. USSR dual meets, among others. There have been 12 world records (including records by Dutch Warmerdam, Jim Ryun, Pat Matzdorf, and Henry Rono), 26 American records and 24 collegiate records set at Edwards.

As of July 2016, the stadium was in need of both concrete repair and seismic upgrading.

== See also ==
- California Memorial Stadium
