= 2025 Stanford Cardinal women's soccer team =

American college soccer season

2025 Stanford Cardinal women's soccer

ACC Regular Season Champions ACC Tournament Champions

NCAA Tournament, Runner-up
- Conference: Atlantic Coast Conference
- U. Soc. Coaches poll: No. 2
- TopDrawerSoccer.com: No. 2
- Record: 21–2–2 (9–0–1 ACC)
- Head coach: Paul Ratcliffe (23rd season)
- Assistant coaches: Paul Hart (5th season); Daisy Sanchez (4th season); Brianna Visalli (2nd season)
- Home stadium: Cagan Stadium

2025 ACC women's soccer standings
| | Conf. | | | | | | Overall |
| Team | W | | L | | T | PCT | W | | L | | T | PCT |
|---|---|---|---|---|---|---|---|---|---|---|---|---|
| No. 2 Stanford ‍†‍‡‍^{y} | 9 | – | 0 | – | 1 | .950 | 21 | – | 2 | – | 2 | .880 |
| No. 11 Notre Dame ‍‍‍^{y} | 8 | – | 1 | – | 1 | .850 | 15 | – | 2 | – | 3 | .825 |
| No. 3 Duke ‍‍‍^{y} | 7 | – | 3 | – | 0 | .700 | 17 | – | 5 | – | 1 | .761 |
| No. 1 Florida State ‍‍‍^{y} | 6 | – | 2 | – | 2 | .700 | 16 | – | 2 | – | 4 | .818 |
| No. 8 Virginia ‍‍‍^{y} | 6 | – | 2 | – | 2 | .700 | 14 | – | 3 | – | 5 | .750 |
| No. 24 Louisville ‍‍‍^{y} | 6 | – | 2 | – | 2 | .700 | 13 | – | 5 | – | 3 | .690 |
| No. 13т North Carolina ‍‍‍^{y} | 6 | – | 4 | – | 0 | .600 | 13 | – | 6 | – | 2 | .667 |
| California ‍‍‍ | 4 | – | 2 | – | 4 | .600 | 8 | – | 3 | – | 8 | .632 |
| Wake Forest ‍‍‍^{y} | 4 | – | 3 | – | 3 | .550 | 11 | – | 5 | – | 4 | .650 |
| NC State ‍‍‍ | 4 | – | 4 | – | 2 | .500 | 5 | – | 9 | – | 4 | .389 |
| Clemson ‍‍‍^{y} | 4 | – | 4 | – | 2 | .500 | 8 | – | 6 | – | 5 | .553 |
| SMU ‍‍‍ | 2 | – | 6 | – | 2 | .300 | 8 | – | 8 | – | 2 | .500 |
| Pittsburgh ‍‍‍ | 2 | – | 8 | – | 0 | .200 | 6 | – | 10 | – | 2 | .389 |
| Miami (FL) ‍‍‍ | 1 | – | 7 | – | 2 | .200 | 7 | – | 8 | – | 3 | .472 |
| Boston College ‍‍‍ | 1 | – | 7 | – | 2 | .200 | 5 | – | 8 | – | 5 | .417 |
| Syracuse ‍‍‍ | 1 | – | 8 | – | 1 | .150 | 5 | – | 9 | – | 4 | .389 |
| Virginia Tech ‍‍‍ | 0 | – | 8 | – | 2 | .100 | 4 | – | 10 | – | 4 | .333 |
† – Conference champion ‡ – 2025 ACC Tournament champion y – Invited to the NCAA Tournament; As of December 9, 2025; Rankings from United Soccer Coaches Poll; Source: The ACC

The 2025 Stanford Cardinal women's soccer team represented Stanford University during the 2025 NCAA Division I women's soccer season. The Cardinal were led by head coach Paul Ratcliffe, in his twenty-third season. They played their home games at Cagan Stadium in Stanford, California. This was the team's 42nd season playing organized women's college soccer and their 2nd playing in the Atlantic Coast Conference.

The Cardinal began the season ranked seventh in the United Soccer Coaches poll and won their first two games by a combined score of 12–1. They defeated sixteenth ranked Santa Clara in their second game. These results saw them rise to second, and after two more wins, they rose to the top of the rankings. They defeated Power 4 opponents Arizona and sixth ranked USC as the top team in the rankings. They lost at eighteenth ranked UCLA in their final non-conference match of the season. They began ACC play ranked third, and drew at Clemson 2–2. They went on to win their remaining nine ACC matches. They only played two ranked teams during the ACC season, defeating top-ranked Virginia and seventh ranked Florida State both by a score of 2–1 in the same week. The Cardinal rose to second in the rankings, and finished the ACC season with a win over rival California by a score of 8–2.

The Cardinal finished the regular season 15–1–1 overall and 9–0–1 in ACC play to finish as regular season conference champions. As the top seed in the ACC Tournament they received a bye into the Semifinals where they defeated fifth seed and seventh ranked Virginia for a second time this season. In the Final, they faced second seed and second ranked Notre Dame. Stanford won the title via penalty shoot-out 5–4 to capture their first ACC Tournament title. They received the ACC's automatic bid to the NCAA Tournament and were the top overall seed and first seed in the Stanford. They defeated Cal Poly in the First Round, eight seed Alabamain the Second Round, and fifth seed BYU in the Round of 16 to reach the Quarterfinals. There they defeated second seed and ninth ranked Michigan State to advance to the College Cup. In the Semifinals they defeated second seed and eleventh ranked Duke to reach the Final. They faced Florida State in a rematch of an October 16 game, but this time lost 1–0 to finish just short of a National Title. The Cardinal finished 21–2–2 overall and this was their second NCAA Final appearance in three years.

== Previous season ==
The Cardinal finished the season 16–5–2 overall and 5–4–1 in ACC play to finish in tie for seventh place. They did not qualify for the ACC Tournament. They received an at-large bid to the NCAA Tournament and were the second seed in the Mississippi State Bracket. They defeated UC Santa Barbara in the First Round, UConn in the Second Round, and advanced in penalties verus second-seed Arkansas in the Round of 16 to reach the Quarterfinals. There they avenged a regular season loss to Notre Dame to advance to the College Cup. In the Semifinals they had a rematch with Wake Forest, but they again lost 1–0 to end their season.

== Offseason ==
=== Departures ===
Departures
| Name | Number | Pos. | Height | Year | Hometown | Reason for departure |
|---|---|---|---|---|---|---|
| Mia Crisera | 14 | MF | 5'7" | Freshman | Manhattan Beach, California | — |
| Avani Brandt | 18 | DF | 5'6" | Senior | Syosset, New York | Graduated; signed professional contract with HB Køge |
| Nya Harrison | 23 | DF | 5'4" | Senior | San Diego, California | Graduated; signed professional contract with San Diego Wave FC |
| Samantha Williams | 25 | FW | 5'4" | Graduate Student | Laguna Beach, California | Graduated; signed professional contract with HB Køge |
| Kellie Pagador | 27 | DF | 5'6" | Senior | Roseville, California | Graduated |
| Haley Craig | 30 | GK | 5'10" | Senior | Dexter, Michigan | Graduated; signed professional contract with Portland Thorns FC |
| Amalie Pianim | 31 | FW | 5'7" | (redshirt) Sophomore | Burlingame, California | Transferred to USC |
| Aki Yuasa | 32 | MF | 5'5" | Junior | Charlotte, Vermont | — |
| Lumi Kostmayer | 33 | FW | 5'11" | Junior | Southbury, Connecticut | Transferred to California |

=== Recruiting class ===
| Name | Nationality | Hometown | Club | TDS Rating |
|---|---|---|---|---|
| Caroline Birkel; GK | (United States) | St. Louis, Missouri | St. Louis Scott Gallagher | 4/5 stars |
| Amelia Bray; FW | (United States) | Bainbridge Island, Washington | Crossfire Premier SC | 4/5 stars |
| Lily Freer; MF | (United States) | Alton, Illinois | St. Louis Scott Gallagher | 3/5 stars |
| Ava Harrison; MF | (United States) | San Diego, California | San Diego Surf | 4/5 stars |
| Brooke Holden; MF | (United States) | Alpine, California | Rebels Soccer Club | 3/5 stars |
| Noe Johnson; MF | (United States) | Oakland, California | Lamorinda SC | 3/5 stars |
| Y-Lan Nguyen; MF | (United States) | Fairfax, Virginia | Virginia Development Academy | 4/5 stars |
| Alex Tay; DF | (United States) | Bellevue, Washington | Seattle United | 3/5 stars |

== Squad ==
=== Roster ===
As of February 11, 2026

Note: Flags indicate national team as defined under FIFA eligibility rules; some limited exceptions apply. Players may hold more than one non-FIFA nationality.

| No. | Pos. | Nation | Player |
|---|---|---|---|
| 0 | GK | USA | Alyssa Savig |
| 1 | GK | USA | Caroline Birkel |
| 2 | DF | USA | Elise Evans |
| 3 | FW | USA | Allie Montoya |
| 4 | DF | USA | Freya Spiekerkoetter |
| 5 | MF | USA | Shae Harvey |
| 6 | DF | USA | Sophie Murdock |
| 7 | DF | USA | Lizzie Boamah |
| 8 | MF | USA | Mia Bhuta |
| 9 | FW | USA | Jaden Thomas |
| 10 | MF | USA | Charlotte Kohler |
| 11 | MF | USA | Eleanor Klinger |
| 12 | MF | USA | Jasmine Aikey |
| 13 | DF | USA | Sammy Smith |

| No. | Pos. | Nation | Player |
|---|---|---|---|
| 14 | DF | USA | Alex Tay |
| 15 | DF | USA | Ella Emri |
| 16 | MF | USA | Milly Bray |
| 17 | FW | USA | Erica Grilione |
| 18 | MF | USA | Y-Lan Nguyen |
| 20 | FW | USA | Andrea Kitahata |
| 21 | MF | USA | Joelle Jung |
| 22 | GK | USA | Kaiya Jota |
| 23 | MF | USA | Lily Freer |
| 24 | FW | USA | Maryn Wolf |
| 25 | MF | USA | Noe Johnson |
| 26 | FW | USA | Ava Harrison |
| 27 | MF | USA | Brooke Holden |
| 28 | DF | USA | Logan Smith |

=== Team management ===
| Position | Staff |
|---|---|
| Head coach | Paul Ratcliffe |
| Assistant Coach | Paul Hart |
| Assistant Coach | Daisy Sanchez |
| Assistant Coach | Brianna Visalli |
| Director of Operations | Mike Davis |

== Schedule ==
| Date Time, TV | Rank^{#} | Opponent^{#} | Result | Record | Site (Attendance) City, State |
Non-conference regular season
| August 14*; 7:00 p.m., ACCNX | No. 7 | San Francisco | W 7–0 | 1–0–0 | Cagan Stadium (1,241); Stanford, CA |
| August 17*; 1:00 p.m., ACCNX | No. 7 | No. 16 Santa Clara | W 5–1 | 2–0–0 | Cagan Stadium (1,801); Stanford, CA |
| August 21*; 7:00 p.m., ACCNX | No. 2 | San Diego State | W 3–0 | 3–0–0 | Cagan Stadium (970); Stanford, CA |
| August 24*; 1:00 p.m., ACCNX | No. 2 | Saint Mary's | W 4–1 | 4–0–0 | Cagan Stadium (970); Stanford, CA |
| August 28*; 7:00 p.m., ACCNX | No. 1 | Arizona | W 6–0 | 5–0–0 | Cagan Stadium (1,151); Stanford, CA |
| September 4*; 7:00 p.m., BTN | No. 1 | at No. 6 USC | W 5–1 | 6–0–0 | McAlister Field (2,278); Los Angeles, CA |
| September 7*; 1:00 p.m., BTN+ | No. 1 | at No. 18 UCLA | L 0–2 | 6–1–0 | Wallis Annenberg Stadium (1,063); Los Angeles, CA |
ACC Regular season
| September 11; 3:00 p.m., ACCN | No. 3 | at Clemson | T 2–2 | 6–1–1 (0–0–1) | Riggs Field (351); Clemson, SC |
| September 14; 10:00 a.m., ACCNX | No. 3 | at Pittsburgh | W 6–0 | 7–1–1 (1–0–1) | Ambrose Urbanic Field (487); Pittsburgh, PA |
| September 25; 7:00 p.m., ACCNX | No. 3 | Boston College | W 2–0 | 8–1–1 (2–0–1) | Cagan Stadium (1,881); Stanford, CA |
| September 28; 1:00 p.m., ACCNX | No. 3 | Syracuse | W 4–0 | 9–1–1 (3–0–1) | Cagan Stadium (1,832); Stanford, CA |
| October 9; 7:00 p.m., ACCNX | No. 3 | Virginia Tech | W 5–0 | 10–1–1 (4–0–1) | Cagan Stadium (1,412); Stanford, CA |
| October 12; 1:00 p.m., ACCNX | No. 3 | No. 1 Virginia | W 2–1 | 11–1–1 (5–0–1) | Cagan Stadium (1,800); Stanford, CA |
| October 16; 4:00 p.m., ACCNX | No. 2 | at No. 7 Florida State | W 2–1 | 12–1–1 (6–0–1) | Seminole Soccer Complex (2,582); Tallahassee, FL |
| October 19; 9:00 a.m., ACCN | No. 2 | at Miami (FL) | W 3–2 | 13–1–1 (7–0–1) | Cobb Stadium (205); Coral Gables, FL |
| October 25; 7:00 p.m., ACCNX | No. 2 | SMU | W 5–1 | 14–1–1 (8–0–1) | Cagan Stadium (1,484); Stanford, CA |
| October 30; 3:00 p.m., ACCNX | No. 2 | at California; Rivalry | W 8–2 | 15–1–1 (9–0–1) | Edwards Stadium (346); Berkeley, CA |
ACC Tournament
| November 6*; 5:00 p.m., ACCN | (1) No. 1 | vs. (5) No. 7 Virginia; Semifinals | W 3–2 | 16–1–1 | WakeMed Soccer Park (1,077); Cary, NC |
| November 9*; 9:00 a.m., ESPNU | (1) No. 1 | vs. (2) No. 2 Notre Dame; Final | T 2–2 (5–4 PKs) | 16–1–2 | WakeMed Soccer Park (1,257); Cary, NC |
NCAA Tournament
| November 14*; 6:00 p.m., ESPN+ | (1) No. 1 | Cal Poly; First Round | W 3–1 | 17–1–2 | Cagan Stadium (1,920); Stanford, CA |
| November 21*; 7:00 p.m., ESPN+ | (1) No. 1 | (8) Alabama; Second Round | W 7–3 | 18–1–2 | Cagan Stadium (2,076); Stanford, CA |
| November 24*; 1:00 p.m., ESPN+ | (1) No. 1 | (5) BYU; Round of 16 | W 6–0 | 19–1–2 | Cagan Stadium (1,744); Stanford, CA |
| November 28*; 2:00 p.m., ESPN+ | (1) No. 1 | (2) No. 9 Michigan State; Quarterfinals | W 5–1 | 20–1–2 | Cagan Stadium (2,088); Stanford, CA |
| December 5*; 5:45 p.m., ESPNU | (1) No. 1 | vs. (2) No. 11 Duke; Semifinals | W 1–0 | 21–1–2 | CPKC Stadium (7,066); Kansas City, MO |
| December 8*; 4:00 p.m., ESPNU | (1) No. 1 | vs. (3) No. 5 Florida State; Final | L 0–1 | 21–2–2 | CPKC Stadium (3,311); Kansas City, MO |
*Non-conference game. ^{#}Rankings from United Soccer Coaches. (#) Tournament seedings in parentheses. All times are in Pacific.

== Awards and honors ==
| Recipient | Award | Date | Ref. |
|---|---|---|---|
| Andrea Kitahata | Pre-season All-ACC Team | August 7 | |
| Mia Bhuta | Top Drawer Soccer Preseason Best XI First Team | August 12 | |
| Elise Evans | Top Drawer Soccer Preseason Best XI Second Team | August 12 | |
| Mia Bhuta | Hermann Trophy Preseason Watchlist | August 14 | |
| Elise Evans | ACC Co-Defensive Player of the Week – Week 1 | August 19 | |
| Jasmine Aikey | ACC Offensive Player of the Week – Week 9 | October 14 | |
| Andrea Kitahata | ACC Offensive Player of the Week – Week 10 | October 21 | |
| Jasmine Aikey | ACC Offensive Player of the Week – Week 12 | October 31 | |
| Paul Ratcliffe | ACC Coach of the Year | November 5 | |
| Elise Evans | ACC Defensive Player of the Year | November 5 | |
| Caroline Birkel | ACC Goalkeeper of the Year | November 5 | |
| Jasmine Aikey | All-ACC First Team | November 5 | |
| Caroline Birkel | All-ACC First Team | November 5 | |
| Elise Evans | All-ACC First Team | November 5 | |
| Andrea Kitahata | All-ACC First Team | November 5 | |
| Shae Harvey | All-ACC Second Team | November 5 | |
| Charlotte Kohler | All-ACC Second Team | November 5 | |
| Caroline Birkel | ACC All-Freshman Team | November 5 | |
| Y-Lan Nguyen | ACC All-Freshman Team | November 5 | |
| Jasmine Aikey | ACC Tournament MVP | November 9 | |
| Jasmine Aikey | All-ACC Tournament Team | November 9 | |
| Elise Evans | All-ACC Tournament Team | November 9 | |
| Andrea Kitahata | All-ACC Tournament Team | November 9 | |
| Charlotte Kohler | All-ACC Tournament Team | November 9 | |

== Rankings ==
Ranking movements Legend: ██ Increase in ranking ██ Decrease in ranking ( ) = First-place votes
| | Week | | | | | | | | | | | | | | | | |
| Poll | Pre | 1 | 2 | 3 | 4 | 5 | 6 | 7 | 8 | 9 | 10 | 11 | 12 | 13 | 14 | 15 | Final |
|---|---|---|---|---|---|---|---|---|---|---|---|---|---|---|---|---|---|
| United Soccer | 7 | 2 (3) | 1 (3) | 1 (6) | 3 | 2 | 3 | 3 | 3 | 2 | 2 | 2 | 1 (8) | Not released | | | 2 |
| TopDrawer Soccer | 2 | 1 | 1 | 1 | 6 | 7 | 5 | 5 | 4 | 2 | 2 | 1 | 1 | 1 | 1 | 1 | 2 |
