= Allie Montoya =

American soccer player (born 2004)

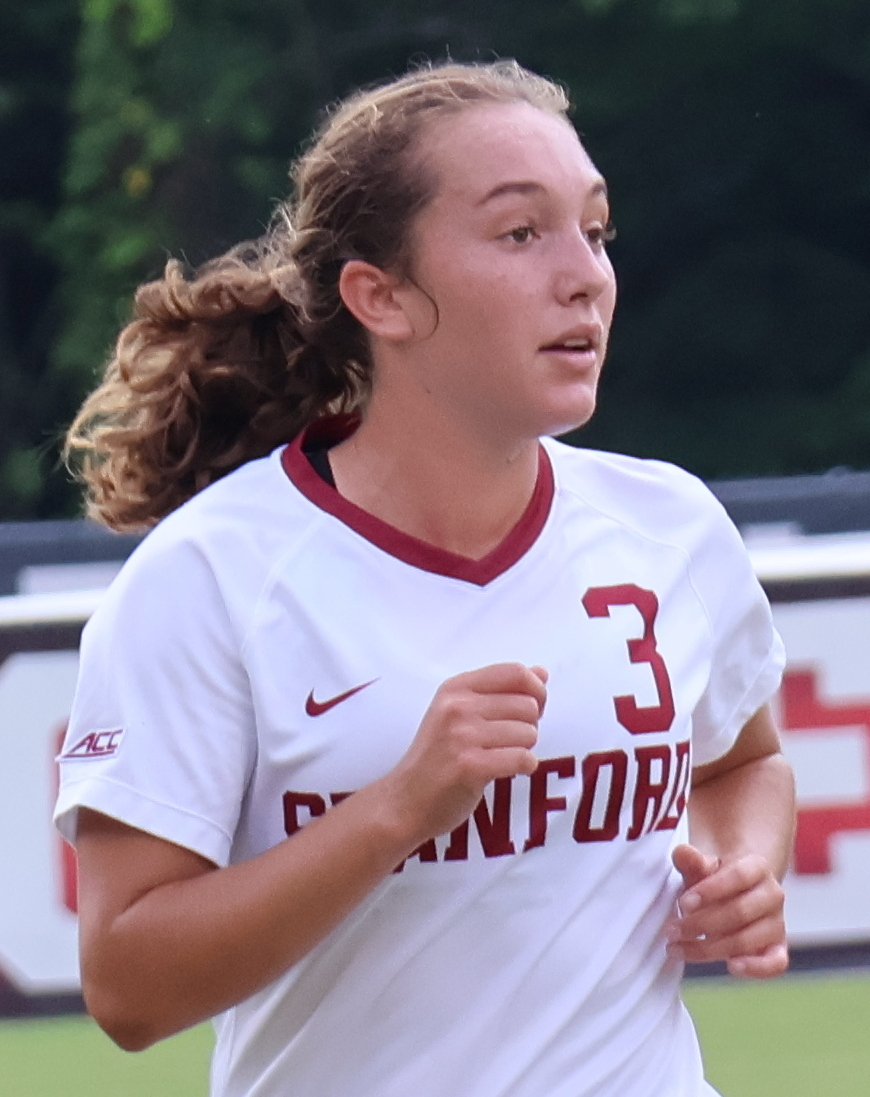
- Montoya with Stanford in 2024

Personal information
- Full name: Allison Montoya
- Date of birth: 2004 (age 21–22)
- Place of birth: Santa Clara, California, U.S.
- Height: 5 ft 3 in (1.60 m)
- Position: Striker

Team information
- Current team: Stanford Cardinal
- Number: 3

Youth career
- MVLA

College career
Years	Team	Apps	(Gls)
2022–	Stanford Cardinal	62	(14)

International career
2018	United States U-15		
2020	United States U-16		

Allison Montoya (born 2004) is an American college soccer player who plays as a striker for the Stanford Cardinal.

== Early life ==
Montoya was born in Santa Clara, California, one of two children of Erin and Albertin Montoya, and grew up in Los Altos. Her parents both played college soccer at Santa Clara University. Montoya attended Mountain View High School, where she was her league's top scorer as a freshman. Coached by her mother, she played club soccer for MVLA Soccer Club, playing alongside future Stanford teammates Elise Evans and Jasmine Aikey and winning ECNL national championships in 2018 and 2021. She was named the ECNL U-17 National Player of the Year in 2021. She committed to Stanford as a freshman in 2019.

== College career ==
Montoya played scored 5 goals in 15 games for Stanford Cardinal as a freshman in 2022, before tearing her anterior cruciate ligament (ACL) during the game against UCLA and missing the rest of the season. She was named third-team All-Pac-12 as the team won the Pac-12 Conference title. Injury to her other leg kept her out to start her sophomore season in 2023, but she returned to score 2 goals in 14 games. In the NCAA tournament semifinals, she scored the opening goal in a 2–0 win over BYU, before losing to Florida State in the final to end their otherwise undefeated season. She played her first injury-free season as a junior in 2024, though she scored just 1 goal in 22 appearances, and played off the bench as Stanford made the NCAA tournament semifinals. In 2025, she scored the opening goal in a 2–2 draw with Notre Dame in the ACC tournament final, winning the title on penalties though Montoya had hers stopped.

== International career ==
Montoya received her first call-up to train with the United States youth national team at the under-14 level at age 13 in 2017. She was selected to the under-15 team that won the 2018 CONCACAF Girls' U-15 Championship. She was called up for the UEFA Development Tournament with the under-16 team in 2020 and trained at the under-20 level in 2021.

== Honors and awards ==
Stanford Cardinal

- Atlantic Coast Conference: 2025
- ACC tournament: 2025
- Pac-12 Conference: 2022

United States U-15

- CONCACAF Girls' U-15 Championship: 2018

Individual

- Third-team All-Pac-12: 2022
