= Kat Rader =

American soccer player (born 2004)

- Rader with the Houston Dash in 2026

Personal information
- Full name: Katherine Ann Rader
- Date of birth: June 30, 2004 (age 22)
- Height: 5 ft 6 in (1.68 m)
- Positions: Attacking midfielder; forward

Team information
- Current team: Houston Dash
- Number: 22

Youth career
- Orlando Pride
- 2019–2021: Weston FC
- 2021–2022: Florida United

College career
Years	Team	Apps	(Gls)
2022–2025	Duke Blue Devils	65	(32)

Senior career*
Years	Team	Apps	(Gls)
2026–	Houston Dash	30	(10)

International career^{‡}
2018	United States U15		
2019–2020	United States U16		
2022–2024	United States U20	8	(4)
2026–	United States U23	1	(0)
- * Club domestic league appearances and goals as of November 1, 2026 ‡ National team caps and goals as of 14:20, March 8, 2026 (UTC)

Katherine Ann Rader (born June 30, 2004) is an American professional soccer player who plays as an attacking midfielder for the Houston Dash of the National Women's Soccer League (NWSL). She played college soccer for the Duke Blue Devils, earning first-team All-American honors in 2025. She has represented the United States at the youth international level.

== Early life ==
Rader grew up in Stuart, Florida. She began playing soccer when she was four years old. She played club soccer for the Orlando Pride, Weston FC, and Florida United in the U.S. Soccer Development Academy/Girls Academy. She committed to play college soccer for the Duke Blue Devils during her freshman year. TopDrawerSoccer ranked her as the 5th-best prospect in the 2022 class.

== College career ==
Rader had an impressive freshman season with the Duke Blue Devils in 2022, forming a strong attacking duo with Hermann Trophy winner Michelle Cooper. She scored 12 goals with 5 assists in 23 games, with her goal tally tying the Duke freshman record and ranking second nationally among freshmen. She helped the Blue Devils reach the ACC tournament semifinals, scoring the winner against Virginia in the first round, and the NCAA tournament quarterfinals. She was named second-team All-ACC, the ACC Freshman of the Year, and TopDrawerSoccer Freshman Best XI.

In 2023, after Cooper left for the NWSL, Duke struggled and missed the NCAA tournament for the first time in eight years. Rader was a bright spot as she led the team with 7 goals and added 2 assists in 16 games and again collected second-team All-ACC honors. Just four games into her junior year in 2024, she fractured her ankle and tore two ligaments and missed the rest of the season. She returned in her senior year to score 12 goals and lead the Blue Devils with 12 assists (tied with Mia Oliaro) in 22 games in 2025. In the NCAA tournament, she had two goals and four assists as Duke made their second consecutive NCAA College Cup appearance. She earned second-team All-ACC and first-team All-American honors.

== Club career ==
Rader with the Houston Dash in 2026

The Houston Dash announced on January 7, 2026, that they had signed Rader to her first professional contract on a three-year deal. She made her professional debut in the season opener on March 14, starting in a 1–0 win over the San Diego Wave. The following week, she scored her first professional goal and assisted Kiki Van Zanten in a 3–0 victory over the Boston Legacy. Two months later, she was named NWSL Rookie of the Month after scoring in consecutive games in May. On July 18, she scored her sixth goal of the season in a 1–1 draw with Racing Louisville, setting a new Dash rookie scoring record. She was named Rookie of the Month for the second time after scoring three times in August. She finished her rookie season with 10 goals in 30 appearances, just one goal shy of Diana Ordóñez's NWSL rookie scoring record. She was the Dash's first double-digit scorer since Rachel Daly in 2018.

== International career ==
Rader began training with the United States youth national team at the under-14 level in 2018. Later that year, she helped the under-15 team win the 2018 CONCACAF Girls' U-15 Championship. She helped the under-20s finish runner-up at the 2023 CONCACAF Women's U-20 Championship, scoring one goal as they qualified for the 2024 FIFA U-20 Women's World Cup.

== Personal life ==
Rader is the daughter of Matt and Christine Rader and has three siblings. She is the granddaughter of Major League Baseball (MLB) player Doug Rader.

== Honors and awards ==
Duke Blue Devils

- Atlantic Coast Conference: 2024

United States U15

- CONCACAF Girls' U-15 Championship: 2018

Individual

- NWSL Rookie of the Month: May 2026, August 2026
- First-team All-American: 2025
- Second-team All-ACC: 2022, 2023, 2025
- ACC Freshman of the Year: 2022
- NCAA tournament all-tournament team: 2025
- ACC tournament all-tournament team: 2022, 2025
