= Karsyn Cherry =

American soccer player (born 2003)

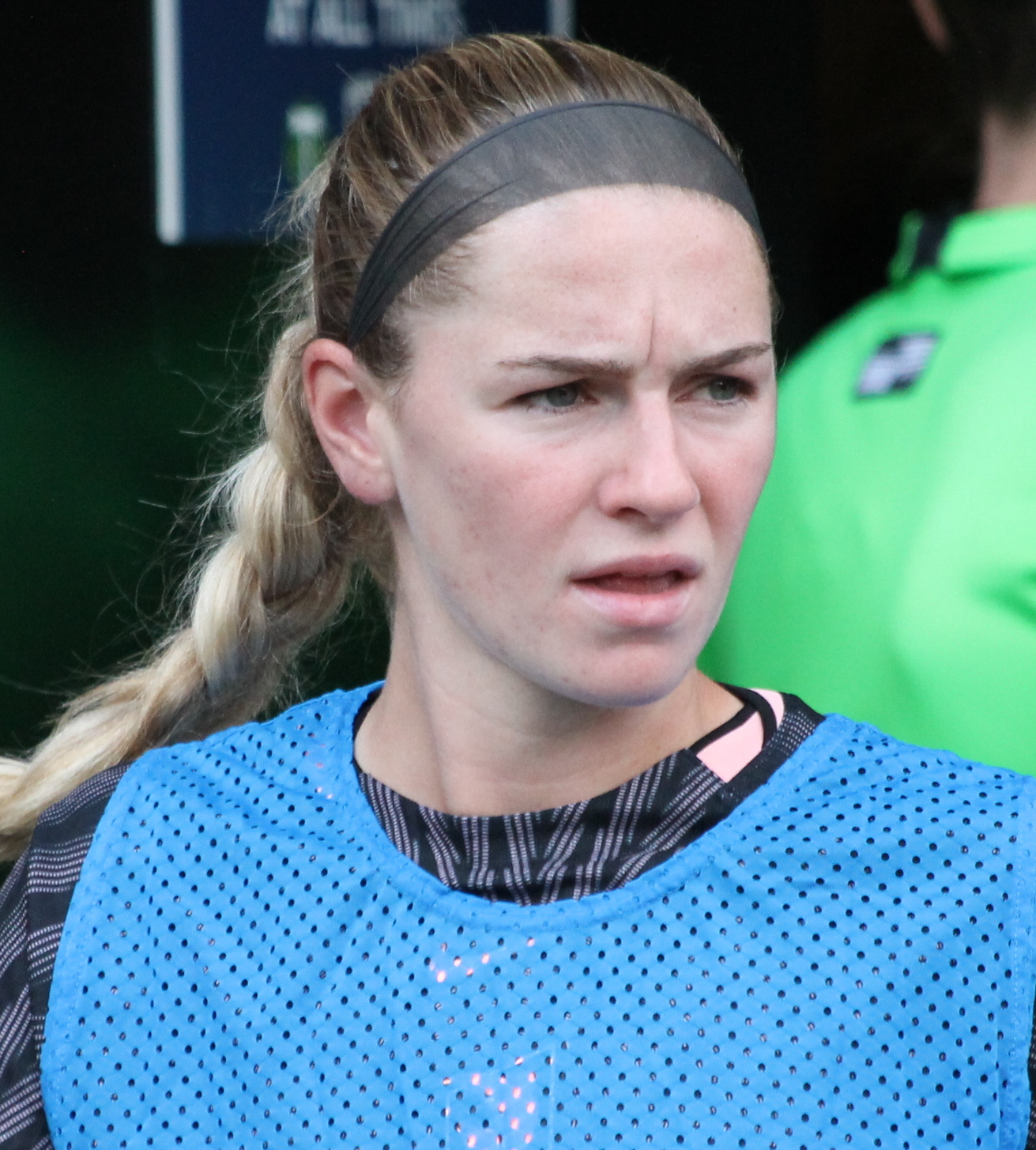
- Cherry with Angel City in 2026

Personal information
- Date of birth: November 2, 2003 (age 23)
- Height: 5 ft 7 in (1.70 m)
- Position: Defender

Team information
- Current team: Angel City
- Number: 4

Youth career
- Indiana Fire
- 2018–2021: Central Catholic Knights

College career
Years	Team	Apps	(Gls)
2022–2025	Louisville Cardinals	69	(12)

Senior career*
Years	Team	Apps	(Gls)
2022–2024	Indy Eleven	14	(1)
2025	Lexington SC (USL W)	3	(0)
2026–	Angel City	6	(0)
- * Club domestic league appearances and goals as of 05:58, November 12, 2026 (UTC)

Karsyn Cherry (born November 2, 2003) is an American professional soccer player who plays as a defender for Angel City FC of the National Women's Soccer League (NWSL). She played college soccer for the Louisville Cardinals, earning second-team All-American honors in 2025.

== Early life ==
Cherry grew up in Lafayette, Indiana. She attended Lafayette Central Catholic Jr/Sr High School where she was a standout in both soccer and basketball. She tied the school's single-season record with 22 goals as a freshman in 2018. In 2019, she broke the record with 32 goals and added 20 assists as she led Central Catholic to their first IHSAA Class 1A state title game appearance. She was also named the Journal & Courier Small School Player in the Year in basketball after averaging 13 points, 7 rebounds, 3 assists and 3 steals per game as a sophomore. After her sophomore year, she committed to play college soccer for the Louisville Cardinals.

Cherry helped lead Central Catholic to their first state championship in her junior year in 2020, scoring 31 goals with 24 assists, and was named the Journal & Courier Player of the Year. She broke her own record with 39 goals in her senior year in 2021, again being named the Journal & Courier Player of the Year, as she established a Tippecanoe County career record with 124 goals. While she mainly played forward for Central Catholic, she played defender for club Indiana Fire Academy. She was named ECNL all-conference multiple times.

== College career ==
Recruited as an outside back, Cherry played out of position at center back for the Louisville Cardinals. Cherry started 14 games and scored 3 goals as a freshman in 2022, ranking second on the team in scoring. She played in all 18 games, starting 17, as a sophomore in 2023. She started all 18 games and scored 6 goals with 1 assist as a junior in 2024, ranking third in minutes played and second in scoring.

In her senior year in 2025, Cherry started 19 games and scored 3 goals with 4 assists. She was team captain as the Cardinals set program scoring records and came one game short of matching their highest win total. Louisville earned their first ACC tournament berth since 2020 and first NCAA tournament berth since 2019. In the NCAA tournament, she converted a penalty in the shootout against Kentucky to reach the second round for the third time in program history, where she had an assist in the loss to Kansas. She was named second-team All-ACC and second-team All-American, the program's first All-American selection since Emina Ekić in 2020.

== Club career ==
Angel City FC announced on January 7, 2026, that they had signed Cherry to her first professional contract on a three-year deal. Six months later, on May 31, she made her professional debut in a 2–1 loss to the North Carolina Courage.

== Honors and awards ==
Individual

- Second-team All-American: 2025
- Second-team All-ACC: 2025
