= Y-Lan Nguyen =

American soccer player (born 2007)

- Nguyen with Stanford in 2026

Personal information
- Full name: Y-Lan Xuan Nguyen
- Date of birth: June 2, 2007 (age 19)
- Place of birth: Fairfax, Virginia, United States
- Height: 5 ft 3 in (1.60 m)
- Position: Midfielder

Team information
- Current team: Stanford Cardinal
- Number: 18

Youth career
- 2021–2025: Virginia Development Academy
- 2022–2023: Fairfax Lions

College career
Years	Team	Apps	(Gls)
2025–	Stanford Cardinal	36	(2)

International career^{‡}
2023	United States U-16	3	(0)
2024	United States U-17	9	(1)
2026–	United States U-20	7	(0)
- ‡ National team caps and goals as of September 16, 2026

Y-Lan Xuan Nguyen (born June 2, 2007) is an American college soccer player who plays as a midfielder for the Stanford Cardinal. She was named the TopDrawerSoccer National Freshman of the Year in 2025. She won bronze with the United States at the 2024 FIFA U-17 Women's World Cup.

== Early life ==
Nguyen was born in Fairfax, Virginia, to Nga and Thieu Nguyen, and has two siblings. Her sister, Y-Van, plays college soccer for James Madison. She played high school soccer at Fairfax High School, earning all-state honors both seasons she played. She played club soccer for the Virginia Development Academy and was named ECNL All-American twice. She committed to play college soccer for Stanford before her junior year. United Soccer Coaches named Nguyen the National Youth Player of the Year for 2024.

== College career ==
Nguyen played in all 25 games, starting 15, and scored 2 goals for the Stanford Cardinal as a freshman in 2025. She helped Stanford win the Atlantic Coast Conference (ACC) regular-season and tournament titles. She started every round in the NCAA tournament as the Cardinal reached the final, losing 1–0 to Florida State. She was named in the ACC all-freshman team and the NCAA all-tournament team and was named the TopDrawerSoccer National Freshman of the Year.

== International career ==
Eligible to represent the United States or Vietnam, Nguyen began her international career training with the United States under-15 team in 2022. In 2023, she won the Montaigu Tournament with the under-16 team. She then helped the under-17s win the 2024 CONCACAF Women's U-17 Championship, scoring one goal in four games. She was named in Katie Schoepfer's roster for the 2024 FIFA U-17 Women's World Cup in the Dominican Republic, playing in four games with one start, as the United States placed third, its best result since 2008. She was called into a development camp, training concurrently with the senior national team, in January 2026.

Nguyen was part of the USWNT under-20 roster at the 2026 FIFA U-20 Women's World Cup in Poland, making three appearances and one start. In the round of 16, she converted a penalty in the shootout as they lost to Brazil.

== Honors and awards ==
Stanford Cardinal

- Atlantic Coast Conference: 2025
- ACC tournament: 2025

United States U-17

- CONCACAF Women's U-17 Championship: 2024
- FIFA U-17 Women's World Cup bronze medal: 2024

Individual

- TopDrawerSoccer National Freshman of the Year: 2025
- Second-team All-ACC: 2026
- ACC all-freshman team: 2025
- NCAA tournament all-tournament team: 2025
