= Izzy Engle =

American soccer player (born 2006)

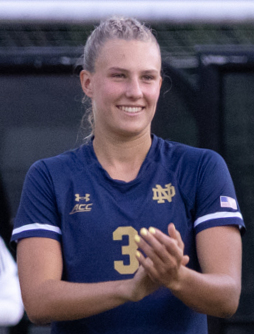
- Engle with Notre Dame in 2025

Personal information
- Full name: Isabela Cristina Lohmann Engle
- Date of birth: July 20, 2006 (age 20)
- Place of birth: Edina, Minnesota, U.S.
- Height: 5 ft 9 in (1.75 m)
- Positions: Striker; attacking midfielder

Team information
- Current team: Notre Dame Fighting Irish
- Number: 3

Youth career
- Minnesota Thunder
- 2020–2023: Edina Hornets

College career
Years	Team	Apps	(Gls)
2024–	Notre Dame Fighting Irish	53	(47)

International career^{‡}
2024–2025	United States U-19	3	(2)
2025–	United States U-20	4	(5)
- ‡ National team caps and goals as of December 4, 2025

Isabela Cristina Lohmann Engle (born July 20, 2006) is an American college soccer player who plays as a striker for the Notre Dame Fighting Irish. She was named the TopDrawerSoccer National Freshman of the Year in 2024 and the ACC Offensive Player of the Year in 2025. She has represented the United States at the youth international level.

== Early life ==
Engle grew up in Edina, Minnesota. She played high school soccer at Edina High School, scoring 96 goals and tallying 56 assists in 41 games. She was named all-state after helping the team to the MSHSL Class 3A semifinals as a sophomore and finishing as state runner-up as a junior. She then led Edina to the Class 3A state championship with a 22–0 record as a senior in 2023. She scored 41 goals on the season, including three in the state semis and two in the final, and was named the Minnesota Star Tribune Metro Player of the Year, Minnesota Gatorade Player of the Year, and United Soccer Coaches high school All-American. She also ran track in high school and won the 4 × 400 meter relay state title as a freshman. She played club soccer for Minnesota Thunder Academy, earning multiple ECNL all-conference honors. She committed to the University of Notre Dame during her junior year. She was ranked by TopDrawerSoccer as the No. 59 prospect of the 2024 class.

== College career ==
Engle opened her scoring account for the Notre Dame Fighting Irish with a hat trick in her second game as a freshman in 2024. She went on to record six games with two or more goals as a freshman including against No. 1–ranked Duke. In the NCAA tournament, she led the Irish with three goals to reach the quarterfinals. She finished the season with 19 goals in 22 games, joint-second-most in the nation and the most by any freshman since 2014. She was named the Atlantic Coast Conference (ACC) Freshman of the Year, first-team All-ACC, second-team All-American, and the TopDrawerSoccer National Freshman of the Year.

Engle scored 19 goals in 19 games as a sophomore in 2025. In the ACC regular season, her 11 goals in 9 games led the conference. She missed the regular-season finale through injury as the Irish finished second in the ACC standings. She returned for the ACC tournament, scoring in both games, but lost to Stanford in the final on penalties. In the NCAA tournament, Notre Dame earned the first overall seed, but Engle failed to score as the Irish were upset in the second round. She was named first-team All-ACC, first-team All-American, and the ACC Offensive Player of the Year.

== International career ==
Engle was called into camp with the United States under-17 team in 2023. She was included as an alternate to the under-19 team at the 2023 Pan American Games, where they won bronze playing against other countries' senior teams. She scored four goals on her under-20 debut against Guyana at the 2025 CONCACAF Women's U-20 Championship. She captained the under-20s in their loss to Canada in the semifinals.

== Personal life ==
Engle is the daughter of Patricia and Ryan Engle and has three brothers. She is of Brazilian descent on her mother's side. Her younger brother Andreas plays college soccer for Harvard.

== Honors and awards ==
Individual

- First-team All-American: 2025
- Second-team All-American: 2024
- First-team All-ACC: 2024, 2025, 2026
- ACC Offensive Player of the Year: 2025
- TopDrawerSoccer National Freshman of the Year: 2024
- ACC Freshman of the Year: 2024
- ACC tournament all-tournament team: 2025
