= Victoria Safradin =

Croatian-American soccer player (born 2005)

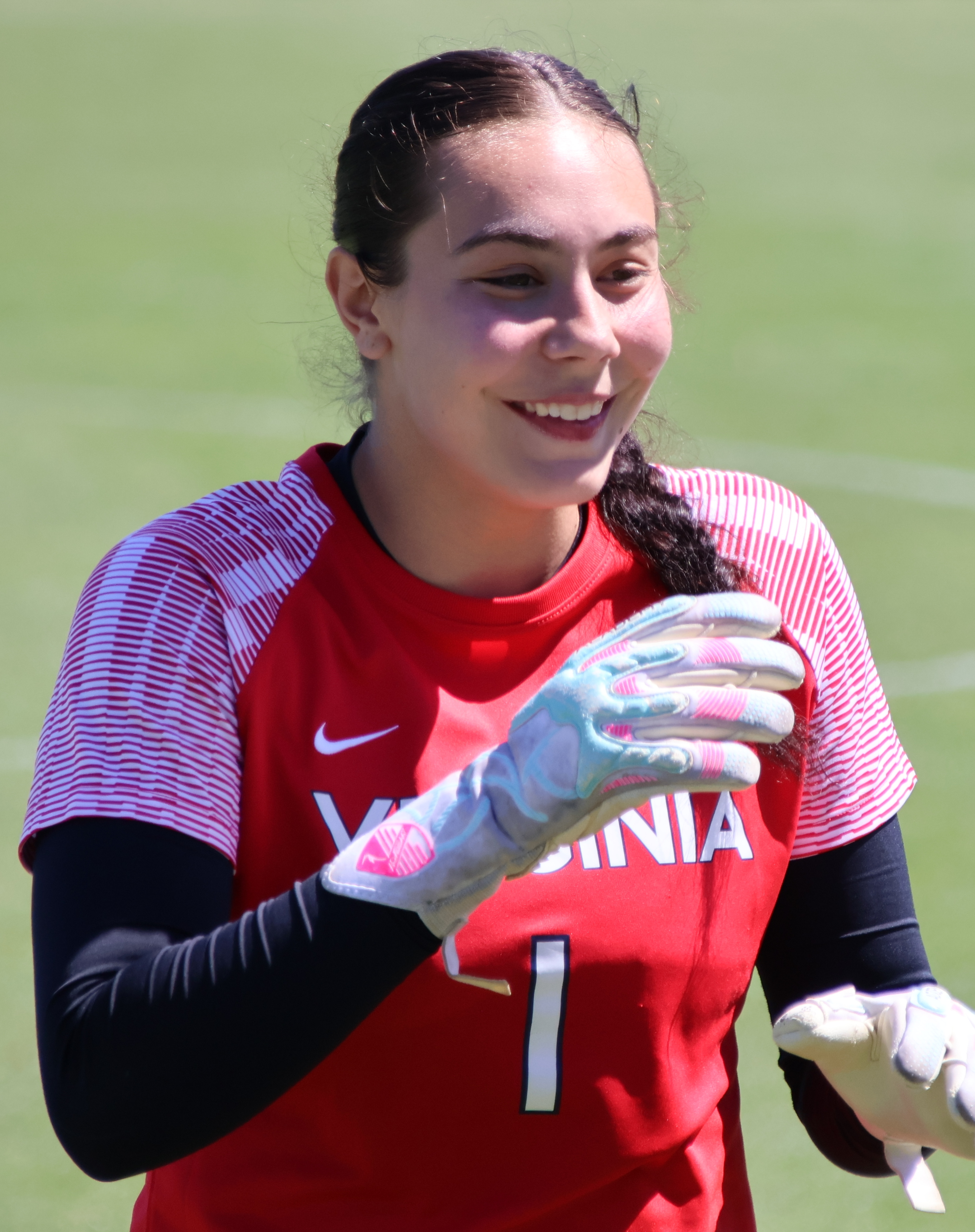
- Safradin with Virginia in 2026

Personal information
- Date of birth: April 23, 2005 (age 21)
- Height: 5 ft 10 in (1.78 m)
- Position: Goalkeeper

Team information
- Current team: Virginia Cavaliers
- Number: 1

Youth career
- Internationals SC

College career
Years	Team	Apps	(Gls)
2023–	Virginia Cavaliers	43	(0)

International career
2022	United States U-17	9	(0)

Victoria Safradin (born April 23, 2005) is a college soccer player who plays as a goalkeeper for the Virginia Cavaliers. Born in the United States, she has been called up to the Croatia national team. She was previously a youth international for the United States, appearing at the 2022 FIFA U-17 Women's World Cup.

== Early life ==
Safradin grew up in the Cleveland suburb of Eastlake, Ohio. She began playing soccer when she was about five, soon specializing in goalkeeping, and joined Internationals SC when she was about eleven. She helped Internationals win the Super Y League under-14 national title in 2018. At the under-17 level, she earned ECNL All-American honors and shared the Conference Player of the Year award with Katie Shea Collins in 2022. She committed to Virginia during her junior year at Eastlake North High School. She was ranked by TopDrawerSoccer as the eighth-best prospect and the top goalkeeper of the 2023 class, part of Virginia's fourth-ranked recruiting class.

== College career ==
Safradin spent her freshman season as the backup to graduate student Cayla White, making four appearances with two starts for the Virginia Cavaliers in 2023. She became the first-choice keeper as a sophomore in 2024, starting all 18 games and keeping 7 solo shutouts (plus two combined shutouts). She trained with NWSL clubs North Carolina Courage and Seattle Reign in the summer of 2025. She opened her junior season with just two goals allowed through nine games, helping the Cavaliers to the No. 1 ranking in the nation. In the ACC tournament quarterfinals, she made a career-high eight saves against Florida State and stopped a penalty in the shootout victory, ending a five-year title run for the Seminoles. The team earned a one seed in the NCAA tournament and lost in the third round on penalties. She finished her junior season with 11 clean sheets in 21 games.

== International career ==
Safradin began training with the United States under-17 team in 2021. She helped the United States win the 2022 CONCACAF Women's U-17 Championship, keeping three clean sheets and allowing just one goal as she earned the tournament's Golden Glove award. She then represented the United States at the 2022 FIFA U-17 Women's World Cup in India, starting and keeping a clean sheet in the opening 8–0 win against the hosts. After starting again in a 1–1 draw with Brazil, she was replaced by Valentina Amaral for the next two games as the team lost in the quarterfinals on penalties. She trained with the under-18/under-19 teams over the following years.

Safradin was called up to the Croatia national team for UEFA Women's Euro qualifying matches in July 2024.

== Personal life ==
Safradin is the daughter of Vlatko and Marina Safradin and has two siblings. Her family moved from Croatia to the United States during the Croatian War of Independence. She was the only member of her family born in the United States.

== Honors and awards ==
United States U-17

- CONCACAF Women's U-17 Championship: 2022

Individual

- Second-team All-ACC: 2025, 2026
- ACC tournament all-tournament team: 2025
- CONCACAF Women's U-17 Championship Golden Glove: 2022
