= Leah Klenke =

American soccer player (born 2004)

- Klenke with the Houston Dash in 2026

Personal information
- Full name: Leah Michelle Klenke
- Date of birth: June 21, 2004 (age 22)
- Height: 5 ft 10 in (1.78 m)
- Positions: Left back; center back

Team information
- Current team: Houston Dash
- Number: 4

Youth career
- Albion Hurricanes

College career
| Years | Team | Apps | (Gls) |
| 2022–2025 | Notre Dame Fighting Irish | 78 | (5) |

Senior career*
| Years | Team | Apps | (Gls) |
| 2026– | Houston Dash | 30 | (1) |

International career^{‡}
| 2023–2024 | United States U-20 | 18 | (0) |
| 2026– | United States U-23 | 5 | (1) |
Medal record
Women's soccer
FIFA U-20 Women's World Cup
| Bronze medal – third place | Colombia 2024 |
- * Club domestic league appearances and goals as of 03:14, November 8, 2026 (UTC) ‡ National team caps and goals as of 14:11, March 8, 2026 (UTC)

Leah Michelle Klenke (born June 21, 2004) is an American professional soccer player who plays as a left back or center back for the Houston Dash of the National Women's Soccer League (NWSL). She played college soccer for the Notre Dame Fighting Irish, earning first-team All-American honors in 2025. She won bronze with the United States at the 2024 FIFA U-20 Women's World Cup.

== Early life ==
Klenke grew up in Houston, Texas, the daughter of parents who attended the University of Notre Dame. She attended Saint Agnes Academy, a Dominican girls' school, where she was part of the soccer, track and field, and cross country teams. She was named first-team all-state and won TAPPS state titles in all three sports, including the 800 meter, 1600 meter, and 3200 meter triple crown in 2021. She played club soccer for the Albion Hurricanes, earning multiple ECNL all-conference honors. She committed to Notre Dame as a freshman.

== College career ==
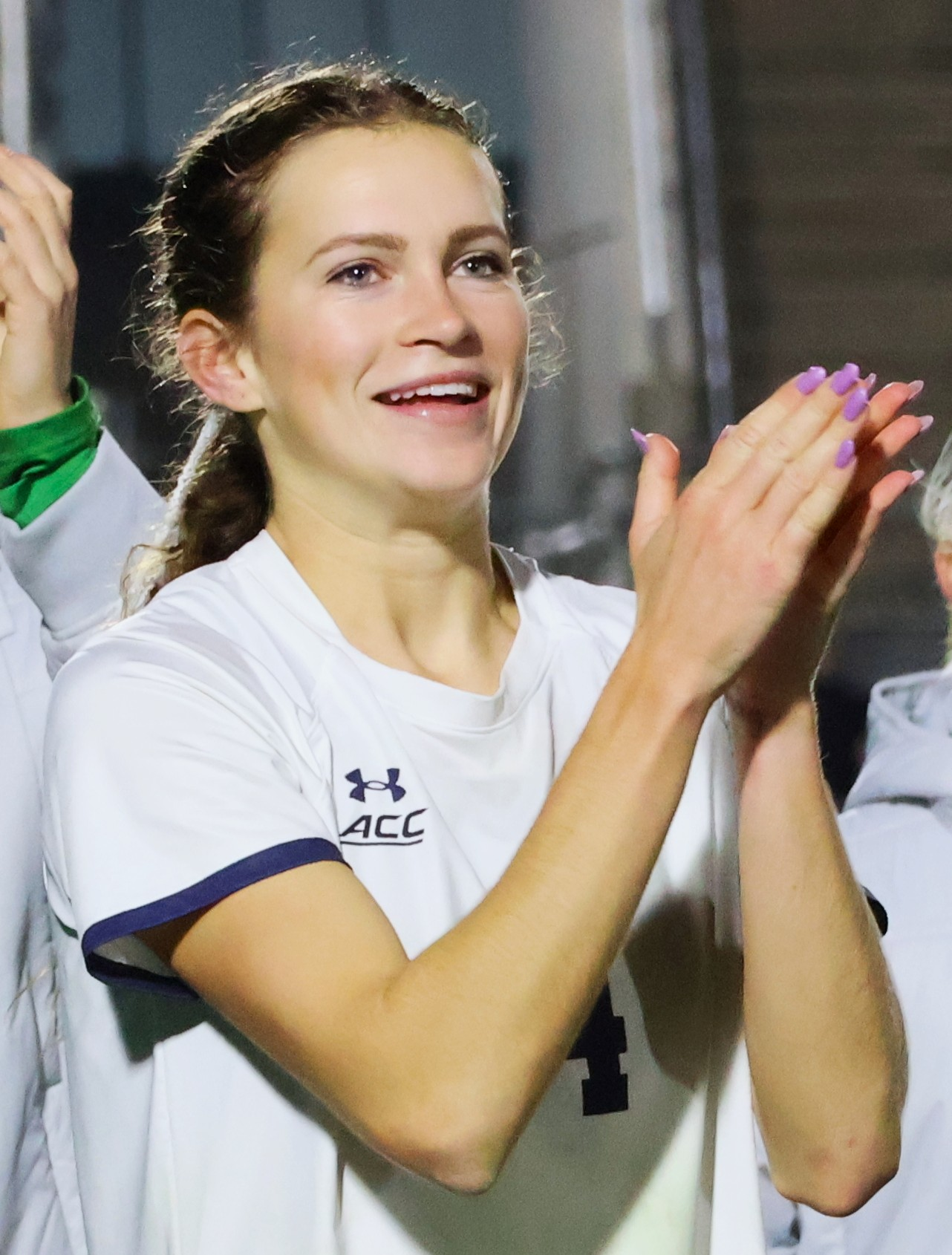
Klenke with Notre Dame in 2025

Klenke started 78 games and scored 5 goals for the Notre Dame Fighting Irish from 2022 to 2025. Recruited as a left wingback, she was also used as a center back by head coach Nate Norman. In 2022, as a freshman, she joined upperclassmen Eva Gaetino and Waniya Hudson on the back line, helping the Irish lead the Atlantic Coast Conference (ACC) in shutout percentage. The team reached the ACC tournament semifinals and earned a one seed in the NCAA tournament, making the quarterfinals. Klenke was named to the ACC all-freshman team and ranked by TopDrawerSoccer as the seventh-best freshman in the country. In 2023, she led the Irish with 10 assists (fourth in the ACC) to finish second in the conference standings, earning second-team All-ACC honors. After missing about a month while at the 2024 FIFA U-20 Women's World Cup, she was named first-team All-ACC as a junior and helped the Irish to the NCAA tournament quarterfinals in 2024. In 2025, she again helped the Irish to second in the ACC standings and reached a program first ACC tournament final. Notre Dame earned the overall top seed in the NCAA tournament but were upset in the second round. Klenke was named first-team All-ACC for the second time and earned first-team All-American recognition.

== Club career ==
Hometown club Houston Dash announced on January 8, 2026, that they had signed Klenke to her first professional contract on a three-year deal. She made her professional debut in the season opener on March 14, playing the entire match in a 1–0 win over the San Diego Wave. Initially lining up at left back, she played every position in the defensive line and eventually stayed at center back.

== International career ==
Klenke was called into training camp with the United States under-14 team in 2018. She was next called into a combined under-18/under-19 camp in early 2023. Later that year, she played at the 2023 CONCACAF Women's U-20 Championship, where the United States U-20s secured qualification for the 2024 FIFA U-20 Women's World Cup. She appeared as a substitute for right back Gisele Thompson in every match at the 2024 FIFA U-20 Women's World Cup, helping the United States finish in third place, its best result since 2012. She converted her penalty kick in a shootout win over Germany in the quarterfinals.

== Honors and awards ==
United States U-20

- FIFA U-20 Women's World Cup bronze medal: 2024

Individual

- First-team All-American: 2025
- First-team All-ACC: 2024, 2025
- Second-team All-ACC: 2023
- ACC all-freshman team: 2022
- ACC tournament all-tournament team: 2025
