= Lily Freer =

American soccer player (born 2006)

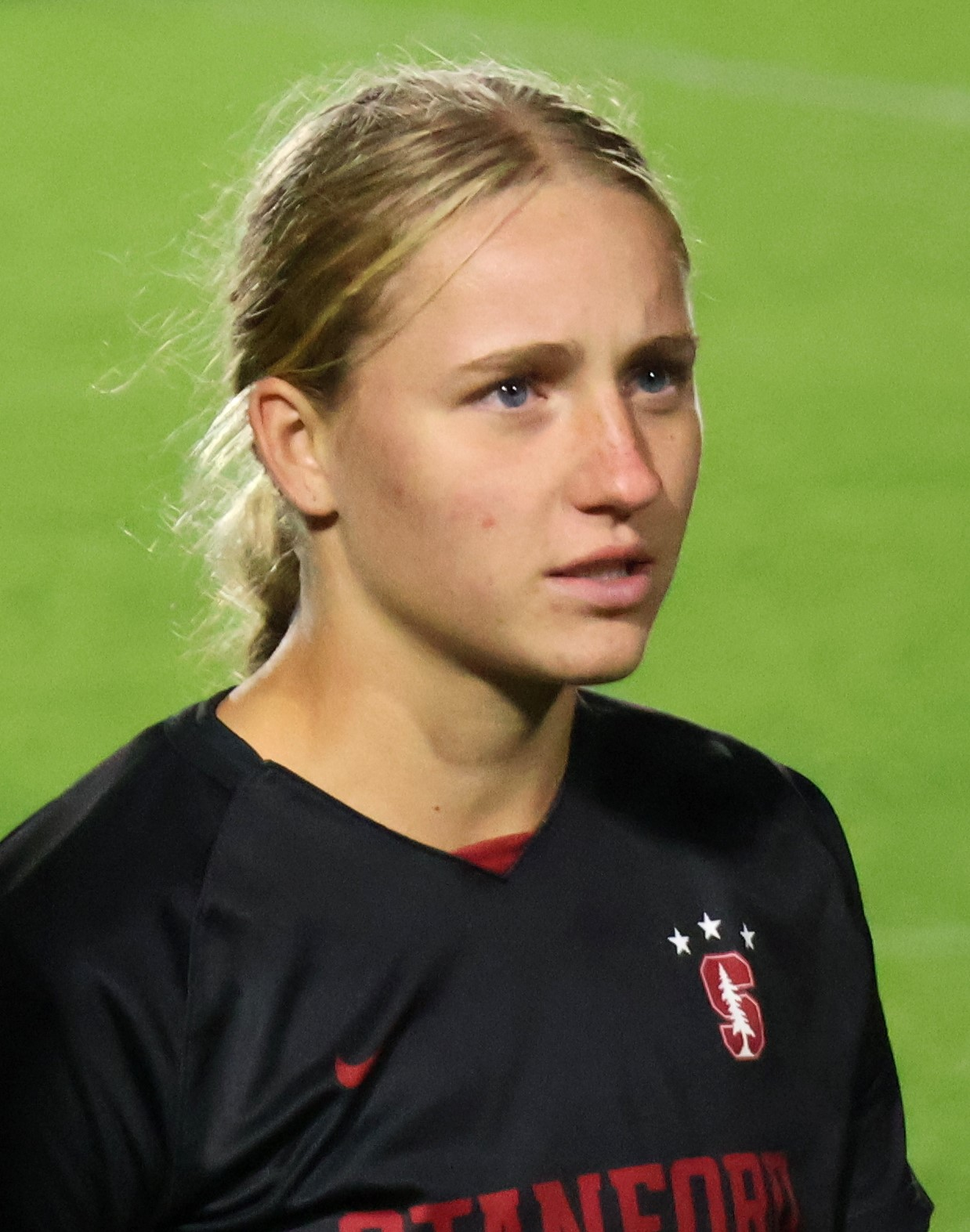
- Freer with Stanford in 2025

Personal information
- Full name: Lillian Freer
- Date of birth: 2006 (age 19–20)
- Height: 5 ft 8 in (1.73 m)
- Positions: Midfielder; defender

Team information
- Current team: Stanford Cardinal
- Number: 23

Youth career
- St. Louis Scott Gallagher SC
- 2022: Alton Redbirds

College career
| Years | Team | Apps | (Gls) |
| 2025– | Stanford Cardinal | 16 | (0) |

Lillian Freer (born 2006) is an American college soccer player who plays as a midfielder or defender for the Stanford Cardinal.

== Early life ==
Freer grew up in Alton, Illinois, the daughter of Carrie and Tim Freer, and has an older sister, Taylor. She attended Alton High School, where she scored 16 goals in 23 games as a freshman, earning all-sectional honors, in her only high school season. She played club soccer for St. Louis Scott Gallagher SC, helping the team win back-to-back ECNL national championships in 2022 and 2023 and being named ECNL all-conference in 2025. Originally a forward, she was moved to defensive midfielder with Scott Gallagher. She committed to Stanford during her junior year.

== College career ==
Freer enrolled early and began training with the Stanford Cardinal in the spring of 2025. She was an immediate starter for the team as a freshman. She was ranked second on TopDrawerSoccer's midseason freshman rankings.

== Honors ==
Stanford Cardinal

- Atlantic Coast Conference: 2025
- ACC tournament: 2025
