= Maggie Cagle =

American soccer player (born 2004)

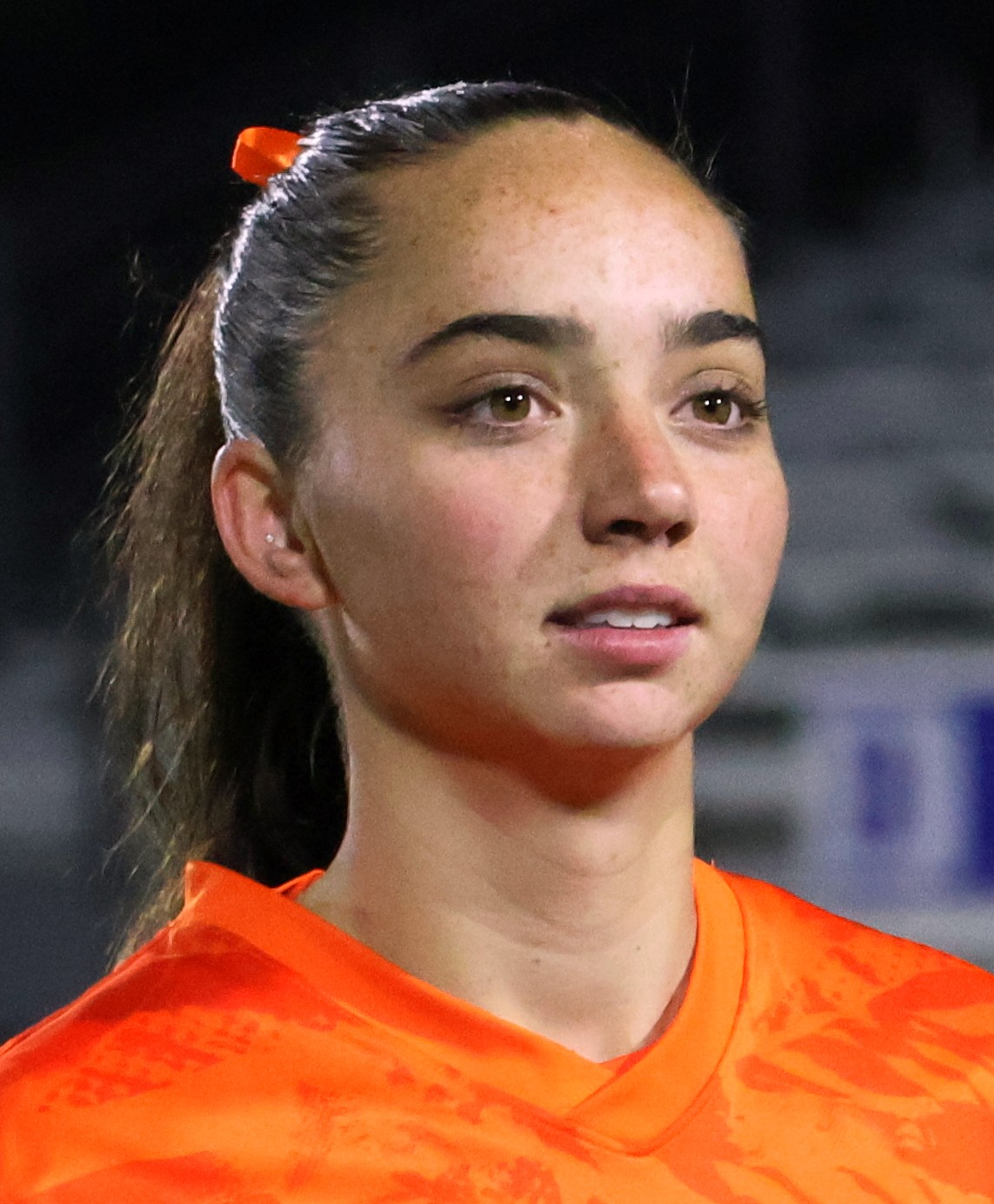
- Cagle with Virginia in 2025

Personal information
- Full name: Maggie Jones Cagle
- Date of birth: May 4, 2004 (age 22)
- Height: 5 ft 5 in (1.65 m)
- Position: Forward

Team information
- Current team: Vittsjö GIK

Youth career
- SC del Sol
- 2019–2022: Phoenix Rising

College career
Years	Team	Apps	(Gls)
2022–2025	Virginia Cavaliers	81	(30)

Senior career*
Years	Team	Apps	(Gls)
2026–	Vittsjö GIK	10	(1)

International career
2018	United States U-15		
2020	United States U-16		
2023	United States U-20		
- * Club domestic league appearances and goals as of September 4, 2026

Maggie Jones Cagle (born May 4, 2004) is an American professional soccer player who plays as a forward for Damallsvenskan club Vittsjö GIK. She played college soccer for the Virginia Cavaliers, earning All-ACC honors all four years. She has represented the United States at the youth international level.

== Early life ==
Cagle grew up in Phoenix, Arizona. She played club soccer for Development Academy outfit SC del Sol before moving to ECNL club Phoenix Rising, where she earned multiple ECNL all-conference honors. She played high school soccer for Arcadia High School, earning all-state honors and being named the Arizona Gatorade Player of the Year after scoring 14 goals with 12 assists in her junior season. TopDrawerSoccer ranked her as the 30th-best prospect in the 2022 class.

== College career ==
Cagle had a strong freshman season with the Virginia Cavaliers in 2022, leading all freshman in the nation with 12 assists and scoring 4 goals in 23 games. She was named third-team All-ACC and helped the Cavaliers to the NCAA tournament quarterfinals. She was an undisputed starter as a sophomore in 2023, scoring 8 goals with 7 assists in 17 games and being named second-team All-ACC, though the team as a whole struggled and missed the NCAA tournament.

Cagle led the Cavaliers with 7 goals and added 5 assists in 19 games in her junior year in 2024, earning third-team All-ACC honors. She scored once in the NCAA tournament as the team made the second round, missing a penalty in their shootout loss. She scored a career-high 11 goals and had 6 assists in 22 games in her senior year in 2025, garnering second-team All-ACC honors. Virginia had a hot start to the year and was ranked No. 1 early on, then earned a one seed in the NCAA tournament. She scored twice in the NCAA tournament as they reached the third round but missed a penalty in their shootout loss. She finished her college career with 30 goals in 81 appearances.

== Club career ==
Swedish club Vittsjö GIK announced on January 7, 2026, that they had signed Cagle to her first professional contract on a one-year deal. She was given the number 10 jersey, which she called an "honor to wear". She made her professional debut against Rosengård in the Swedish Women's Cup, starting in a 1–1 draw. On March 28, she made her Damallsvenskan debut in the league opener, but Vittsjö lost 2–1 to promoted Eskilstuna United. On September 5, after missing three months due to a knee injury, she returned to score her first professional goal, concluding a 5–0 league win against Uppsala.

== International career ==
Cagle began training with the United States youth national team at the under-14 level in 2018, with her mother Kelly Cagle among the coaches on staff. She was part of the under-15 team that won the 2018 CONCACAF Girls' U-15 Championship. She played for the under-20 team that finished runner-up to Mexico at the 2023 CONCACAF Women's U-20 Championship.

== Personal life ==
Cagle is one of two daughters born to Dan and Kelly Cagle. Her mother played for the United States national team and was the longtime coach of the Virginia Tech Hokies.

== Honors and awards ==
United States U-15

- CONCACAF Girls' U-15 Championship: 2018

Individual

- Second-team All-ACC: 2023, 2025
- Third-team All-ACC: 2022, 2024
