= Andrea Kitahata =

American soccer player (born 2003)

- Kitahata with Gotham FC in 2026

Personal information
- Full name: Andrea DeMoor Kitahata
- Date of birth: January 1, 2003 (age 23)
- Place of birth: San Francisco, California, United States
- Height: 5 ft 7 in (1.70 m)
- Position: Forward

Team information
- Current team: Gotham FC
- Number: 24

College career
Years	Team	Apps	(Gls)
2021–2025	Stanford Cardinal	99	(39)

Senior career*
Years	Team	Apps	(Gls)
2023–2024	San Francisco Glens	10	(5)
2026–	Gotham FC	9	(0)

International career^{‡}
2018	United States U-16		
2019	United States U-17	2	(0)
2022	United States U-20	9	(7)
2026–	United States U-23	1	(0)
- * Club domestic league appearances and goals as of November 1, 2026 ‡ National team caps and goals as of 14:20, March 8, 2026 (UTC)

Andrea DeMoor Kitahata (born January 1, 2003) is an American professional soccer player who plays as a forward for Gotham FC of the National Women's Soccer League (NWSL). She played college soccer and college squash for the Stanford Cardinal. She represented the United States at the 2022 FIFA U-20 Women's World Cup.

== Early life ==
Kitahata was born in San Francisco, one of three children of Ingrid DeMoor and Luther Kitahata, and grew up in Hillsborough, California. She attended San Mateo High School. She captained her club team in the San Jose Earthquakes academy and later won the GA under-19 national title with FC Bay Area Surf. She also played squash growing up and was ranked fourth in the nation at the under-13 level, but gave up the sport after committing to Stanford for soccer. She trained with NWSL club OL Reign the spring before college. TopDrawerSoccer ranked her as the 6th-best prospect in the 2021 class, part of Stanford's fifth-ranked recruiting class.

== College career ==
Kitahata was an immediate starter for the Stanford Cardinal as a freshman in 2021, scoring 4 goals and leading the team with 6 assists in 20 games, and earned second-team All-Pac-12 honors. After playing six games as a sophomore in 2022, she decided to take a redshirt for her mental health as she was dealing with the loss of her close friend and teammate Katie Meyer, who died by suicide earlier in the year. She later appeared in a documentary about mental health called It's Time We Talk About It. Before returning the soccer team, she joined Stanford's intercollegiate squash team under her former club coach Mark Talbott, playing in the team's number eight spot at the MASC and CSA tournaments in the spring of 2023. Later that year, she starred for the San Francisco Glens in the USL W League, helping lead them to the division and conference titles and the national semifinals.

Kitahata with Stanford in 2024

Kitahata had a strong return to soccer as a redshirt sophomore in 2023, scoring 9 goals with 9 assists in 25 games, again being named second-team All-Pac 12. She scored three goals in the NCAA tournament as Stanford reached the final, losing to Florida State to end their otherwise undefeated season. She became a team captain as a redshirt junior in 2024, leading the Cardinal with 9 goals and adding 6 assists in 23 games. She had a goal and an assist against Notre Dame to advance to the NCAA tournament semifinals.

After fielding several professional offers, Kitahata decided to play a fifth season at Stanford in 2025. She scored a career-high 17 goals (second on the team to Jasmine Aikey) and had 10 assists in 25 games, earning first-team All-ACC honors. She co-captained the Cardinal to their first ACC regular-season and tournament titles. She scored four goals in the NCAA tournament as the Cardinal reached the final, again losing to Florida State.

== Club career ==
Gotham FC announced on January 8, 2026, that they had signed Kitahata to her first professional contract on a one-year deal. On February 1, she made her professional debut against AS FAR at the Emirates Stadium, playing the last 30 minutes at left back in the 4–0 win for third place at the inaugural FIFA Women's Champions Cup.

== International career ==
Kitahata was called into training camp with the United States under-15 team in 2017. She won UEFA Development Tournaments with the under-16 and under-17 teams the following two years. She was also invited to train with the Japan youth national team in 2018. She was going to play for the United States at the 2021 FIFA U-17 Women's World Cup, but the tournament was cancelled due to the COVID-19 pandemic. The next year, with the under-20 team, she scored seven goals in six games at the 2022 CONCACAF Women's U-20 Championship, recognized as the competition's second-highest scorer. She was selected to the roster at the 2022 FIFA U-20 Women's World Cup, where the United States exited in the group stage.

== Honors and awards ==
Stanford Cardinal

- Atlantic Coast Conference: 2025
- ACC tournament: 2025
- Pac-12 Conference: 2022

Gotham FC

- NWSL Shield: 2026
- NWSL Challenge Cup: 2026

Individual

- First-team All-ACC: 2025
- Second-team All-Pac-12: 2021, 2023
- ACC tournament all-tournament team: 2025
