= Teagan Wy =

American soccer player (born 2004)

- Wy with Gotham FC in 2026

Personal information
- Full name: Teagan Trentina Wy
- Date of birth: July 30, 2004 (age 22)
- Height: 5 ft 10 in (1.78 m)
- Position: Goalkeeper

Team information
- Current team: Gotham FC
- Number: 31

Youth career
- OC Surf
- So Cal Blues

College career
Years	Team	Apps	(Gls)
2022–2025	California Golden Bears	53	(0)

Senior career*
Years	Team	Apps	(Gls)
2026–	Gotham FC	0	(0)

International career^{‡}
2019	United States U-15	1	(0)
2023–2024	United States U-20	14	(0)
Medal record
Women's soccer
FIFA U-20 Women's World Cup
Bronze medal – third place	Colombia 2024
- * Club domestic league appearances and goals ‡ National team caps and goals as of September 21, 2024

Teagan Trentina Wy (born July 30, 2004) is an American professional soccer player who plays as a goalkeeper for Gotham FC of the National Women's Soccer League (NWSL). She played college soccer for the California Golden Bears. She won bronze with the United States at the 2024 FIFA U-20 Women's World Cup.

== Early life ==
Wy grew up in Rancho Santa Margarita, California, the daughter of Christine and Fred Wy. Her grandfather played professional soccer, and she is a relative of English goalkeeper Carl Muggleton. She attended Santa Margarita Catholic High School and played club soccer OC Surf and So Cal Blues. She committed to the University of California, Berkeley, as a freshman, and was ranked as the No. 18 recruit of the class of 2022. She trained with NWSL club San Diego Wave FC during the summers before and after her first year of college.

== College career ==
Following one year as the backup to Angelina Anderson, Wy became the starting keeper for the California Golden Bears as a sophomore in 2023. She started all 19 games and kept 5 shutouts, ranking fourth in the Pac-12 Conference in save percentage and saves per game, and earned third-team All-Pac 12 honors. Despite missing about a month while at the 2024 FIFA U-20 Women's World Cup, she was named second-team All-ACC in her junior year after starting 10 games with 1 shutout and ranking fourth in the ACC in save percentage in 2024. She started all 19 games and produced a career-high 8 clean sheets (fourth in the ACC) in her senior year in 2025.

== Club career ==
NWSL champions Gotham FC announced on January 16, 2026, that they had signed Wy to her first professional contract on a three-year deal.

== International career ==
Wy trained with the United States youth national team beginning at the under-14 level in 2018. She was the starting keeper at the 2018 CONCACAF Girls' U-15 Championship, which the United States won. After being the backup keeper at the 2022 FIFA U-20 Women's World Cup, she started in goal for the under-20 team at the 2023 CONCACAF Women's U-20 Championship, helping them qualify for the 2024 FIFA U-20 Women's World Cup. She played every minute of the 2024 U-20 Women's World Cup, helping the United States finish in third place, the country's best result since 2012. She made multiple key saves late in their 2–2 draw to Germany in the quarterfinals; in the resulting penalty shootout, after one German make and two misses, Wy saved the fourth kick to send the United States to the semifinals, 3–1. She was invited by Emma Hayes as a training player at Futures Camp, practicing concurrently with the senior national team, in January 2025.

== Honors and awards ==
Gotham FC

- NWSL Shield: 2026
- NWSL Challenge Cup: 2026

United States U-15

- CONCACAF Girls' U-15 Championship: 2018

United States U-20

- FIFA U-20 Women's World Cup bronze medal: 2024

Individual

- Second-team All-ACC: 2024
- Third-team All-Pac-12: 2023
