= Lafayette Central Catholic Jr/Sr High School =

Location
- 2410 South Ninth Street; Lafayette, Indiana 47909-2499; United States
- 40°23′35″N 86°53′9″W

Information
- School type: Private, Secondary school
- Religious affiliations: Roman Catholic; Diocese of Lafayette-in-Indiana
- Established: 1956; 70 years ago
- Principal: Daniel Charlebois
- Teaching staff: 28.9 (FTE) (2023-24)
- Grades: 7–12
- Enrollment: 469 (2023-24)
- Student to teacher ratio: 16.2 (2023-24)
- Colors: Navy Blue; White
- Athletics conference: Hoosier Conference
- Nickname: Knights
- Accreditation: North Central Association of Colleges and Schools
- Yearbook: Lance
- Website: cc.lcss.org

Lafayette Central Catholic Jr/Sr High School is a Roman Catholic secondary school serving grades 7–12 in Lafayette, Indiana, United States.

== History ==
Central Catholic was founded in 1956.

In 1959, Senator John F. Kennedy brought his presidential campaign to Central Catholic. He spoke before thousands at a fund-raising dinner in McHale Gymnasium.

In 1990, citing a lack of support, money, and enrollment, CC threatened to close its doors. Former bishop, William Higi, announced in the spring of 1990 that CC's doors would close at the end of the school year. The announcement resulted in a strong showing of support from the principal at that time, Dave Worland, which eventually led to the reversal of the decision to close the school's doors.

== Demographics ==
The demographic breakdown of the 440 students enrolled for the 2017–18 school year was:

- American Indian/Alaska Native – 0%
- Asian – 0.7%
- Black – 2.0%
- Hispanic – 6.4%
- White – 90.9%
- Native Hawaiian/Pacific islander – 0%
- Two or more races – 0%

== Athletics ==
Central Catholic is currently a member of the Hoosier Athletic Conference. The following sports are offered at CC:

- Baseball (boys)
  - State champion – 2003–04, 2006–07, 2008–09, 2009–10, 2010–11, 2011–12, 2012–13
- Basketball (boys & girls)
  - Boys state champion – 1997–98, 1999–00, 2002–03
  - Girls state champion – 2005–06, 2014–15, 2015–16
- Bowling (co-ed)
- Cross country (co-ed)
- Football (boys)
  - State champion – 1976–77, 1999–00, 2009–10, 2010–11, 2011–12, 2012–13, 2015–16, 2019–20
- Golf (boys & girls)
- Gymnastics (girls)
- Soccer (boys & girls)
  - Girls state champion – 2020–21
- Softball (girls)
- Swimming & diving (boys & girls)
- Tennis (boys & girls)
- Track & field (co-ed)
- Volleyball (girls)
  - State champion – 2010–11, 2017–18, 2021–22
- Wrestling (boys)

== Notable alumni ==
- Tessie Agana, Filipina former child actress
- Christopher Cassidy, former NASA astronaut and United States Navy SEAL
- Karsyn Cherry, professional soccer player in the NWSL
- Ben Hatke, cartoonist and illustrator
- Coy Cronk, NFL player for the Jacksonville Jaguars

== See also ==
- List of high schools in Indiana
