= 2025 Atlantic Coast Conference women's soccer season =

- League: NCAA Division I
- Sport: Soccer
- Duration: August 17, 2025 – October 30, 2025
- Teams: 17

Regular season
- Season champions: Stanford
- Runners-up: Notre Dame
- Season MVP: Offensive:Izzy Engle; Midfielder:Lia Godfrey; Defensive:Elise Evans
- Top scorer: Izzy Engle (Notre Dame)

Tournament
- Champions: Stanford
- Runners-up: Notre Dame
- Finals MVP: Jasmine Aikey, (Stanford)

ACC women's soccer seasons
- ← 2024 2026 →

2025 ACC women's soccer standings
	Conf.						Overall
Team	W		L		T	PCT	W		L		T	PCT
No. 2 Stanford ‍†‍‡‍^{y}	9	–	0	–	1	.950	21	–	2	–	2	.880
No. 11 Notre Dame ‍‍‍^{y}	8	–	1	–	1	.850	15	–	2	–	3	.825
No. 3 Duke ‍‍‍^{y}	7	–	3	–	0	.700	17	–	5	–	1	.761
No. 1 Florida State ‍‍‍^{y}	6	–	2	–	2	.700	16	–	2	–	4	.818
No. 8 Virginia ‍‍‍^{y}	6	–	2	–	2	.700	14	–	3	–	5	.750
No. 24 Louisville ‍‍‍^{y}	6	–	2	–	2	.700	13	–	5	–	3	.690
No. 13т North Carolina ‍‍‍^{y}	6	–	4	–	0	.600	13	–	6	–	2	.667
California ‍‍‍	4	–	2	–	4	.600	8	–	3	–	8	.632
Wake Forest ‍‍‍^{y}	4	–	3	–	3	.550	11	–	5	–	4	.650
NC State ‍‍‍	4	–	4	–	2	.500	5	–	9	–	4	.389
Clemson ‍‍‍^{y}	4	–	4	–	2	.500	8	–	6	–	5	.553
SMU ‍‍‍	2	–	6	–	2	.300	8	–	8	–	2	.500
Pittsburgh ‍‍‍	2	–	8	–	0	.200	6	–	10	–	2	.389
Miami (FL) ‍‍‍	1	–	7	–	2	.200	7	–	8	–	3	.472
Boston College ‍‍‍	1	–	7	–	2	.200	5	–	8	–	5	.417
Syracuse ‍‍‍	1	–	8	–	1	.150	5	–	9	–	4	.389
Virginia Tech ‍‍‍	0	–	8	–	2	.100	4	–	10	–	4	.333
† – Conference champion ‡ – 2025 ACC Tournament champion y – Invited to the NCAA Tournament; As of December 9, 2025; Rankings from United Soccer Coaches Poll; Source: The ACC

The 2025 Atlantic Coast Conference women's soccer season was the 36th season of women's varsity soccer in the conference. The season began in August. Conference play began in September and concluded in October. The 2025 ACC women's soccer tournament was held from November 2 through November 9 at campus sites and at WakeMed Soccer Park in Cary, North Carolina.

The Stanford Cardinal finished as regular season champions with a record of 9–0–1. The Cardinal used their top seed to win the ACC tournament in a penalty shoot-out over regular season runner-up Notre Dame. The ACC had nine teams selected for the NCAA tournament, which was tied for the most of any conference. Three ACC teams reached the College Cup, with Florida State prevailing to win the national title. This marked the third straight year an ACC team won the national title.

== Teams ==
=== Stadiums and locations ===
Team	Stadium	Capacity
Boston College Eagles	Newton Soccer Complex	1,800
California Golden Bears	Edwards Stadium	22,000
Clemson Tigers	Riggs Field	6,500
Duke Blue Devils	Koskinen Stadium	7,000
Florida State Seminoles	Seminole Soccer Complex	2,000
Louisville Cardinals	Lynn Stadium	5,300
Miami Hurricanes	Cobb Stadium	500
NC State	Dail Soccer Field	3,000

Team	Stadium	Capacity
North Carolina Tar Heels	Dorrance Field	4,200
Notre Dame Fighting Irish	Alumni Stadium	2,500
Pittsburgh Panthers	Ambrose Urbanic Field	735
SMU Mustangs	Washburne Stadium	2,577
Stanford Cardinal	Cagan Stadium	2,000
Syracuse Orange	SU Soccer Stadium	1,500
Virginia Cavaliers	Klöckner Stadium	7,100
Virginia Tech Hokies	Thompson Field	2,500
Wake Forest Demon Deacons	Spry Stadium	3,000

1. Georgia Tech does not sponsor women's soccer

== Coaches ==
=== Head coaching changes ===
Two ACC teams entered the season with four new coaches:

- Duke head coach Robbie Church retired after twenty-four season as head coach of the program. Kieran Hall was hired as his replacement in January 2025.
- NC State head coach Tim Santoro was fired after twelve seasons in charge of the program on November 8, 2024. Garry Higgins was hired from East Carolina to be the new head coach on December 12, 2024.
- Damon Nahas was made the permanent head coach at North Carolina after serving in an interim role during the 2024 season.
- Randy Waldrum was elevated to Technical Director of the Pittsburgh Panthers program on May 22, 2025. Ben Waldrum was promoted from associate head coach to head coach on the same day.

=== Head coaching records ===
Team	Head coach	Years at school	Overall record	Record at school	ACC record
Boston College	Chris Watkins	2	91–38–18	12–5–2	4–4–2
California	Neil McGuire	19	235–180–49	191–111–43	5–4–1
Clemson	Eddie Radwanski	15	288–154–51	149–89–37	63–64–14
Duke	Kieran Hall	1	0–0–0	0–0–0	0–0–0
Florida State	Brian Pensky	4	239–116–53	54–5–8	24–4–2
Louisville	Karen Ferguson-Dayes	24	211–198–51	211–198–51	38–55–16
Miami	Ken Masuhr	2	5–8–4	5–8–4	1–6–3
North Carolina	Damon Nahas	1	22–5–0	22–5–0	7–3–0
NC State	Gary Higgins	1	110–48–28	0–0–0	0–0–0
Notre Dame	Nate Norman	8	140–77–29	82–42–16	38–21–6
Pittsburgh	Ben Waldrum	1	0–0–0	0–0–0	0–0–0
SMU	Nicole Nelson	4	27–19–8	27–19–8	2–6–2
Stanford	Paul Ratcliffe	23	447–106–48	392–62–41	5–4–1
Syracuse	Nicky Adams	7	105–73–31	24–61–10	3–48–6
Virginia	Steve Swanson	25	488–176–74	384–113–63	152–56–29
Virginia Tech	Charles Adair	15	169–89–30	169–89–30	65–59–18
Wake Forest	Tony da Luz	28	364–241–64	319–200–62	110–120–29

Notes

- Records shown are prior to the 2025 season
- Years at school includes the 2025 season

== Pre-season ==
=== Hermann Trophy Watchlist ===
The Hermann Trophy preseason watchlist was released on August 14, 2025. Nine ACC players were selected the preseason watchlist, including the winner of the 2024 award, Kate Faasse.

Player	Class	Position	School
Mia Bhuta	Junior	MF	Stanford
Tessa Dellarose	Senior	MF	North Carolina
Jordynn Dudley	Junior	MF	Florida State
Izzy Engle	Sophomore	FW	Notre Dame
Kate Faasse	Senior	FW	North Carolina
Heather Gilchrist	Senior	DF	Florida State
Leah Klenke	Senior	DF	Notre Dame
Cameron Roller	Junior	DF	Duke
Mia Oliaro	Junior	FW	Duke

=== Pre-season poll ===
The pre-season poll and pre-season all conference teams were voted on by the league's 17 head coaches. The results of the poll were released on August 7, prior to the season starting.

==== Pre-season Coaches Poll ====
Predicted finish	Team	Points (1st place)
1	North Carolina	246 (10)
2	Notre Dame	229 (2)
3	Florida State	225 (4)
4	Duke	208
5	Stanford	201
6	Wake Forest	172
7	Virginia	169 (1)
8	Virginia Tech	162
9	Clemson	132
10	California	124
11	Pittsburgh	111
12	SMU	83
13	Boston College	81
14	Louisville	67
15	Miami	44
16	NC State	40
17	Syracuse	18

==== Pre-season All-ACC Team ====
Position	Player	Class	School
Goalkeeper	Teagan Wy	Senior	California
Defender	Heather Gilchrist	Senior	Florida State
Defender	Leah Klenke	Senior	Notre Dame
Defender	Cameron Roller	Junior	Duke
Midfielder	Tessa Dellarose	Senior	North Carolina
Midfielder	Mia Oliaro	Junior	Duke
Midfielder	Linda Ullmark	Sophomore	North Carolina
Forward	Maggie Cagle	Senior	Virginia
Forward	Jordynn Dudley	Junior	Florida State
Forward	Izzy Engle	Sophomore	Notre Dame
Forward	Kate Faasse	Senior	North Carolina
Forward	Andrea Kitahata	(redshirt) Senior	Stanford
Forward	Mia Minestrella	Junior	Duke
Forward	Olivia Thomas	Junior	North Carolina

== Regular season ==
=== Conference Matrix ===
The table below shows head-to-head results between teams in conference play. Each team plays ten matches. Each team does not play every other team.

	Boston College	California	Clemson	Duke	Florida State	Louisville	Miami	North Carolina	NC State	Notre Dame	Pittsburgh	SMU	Stanford	Syracuse	Virginia	Virginia Tech	Wake Forest
vs. Boston College	–	0–0	1–0	×	×	1–0	×	3–1	1–0	×	2–1	×	2–0	0–1	2–0	×	0–0
vs. California	0–0	–	2–2	×	2–2	×	0–2	×	×	×	1–2	2–1	8–2	0–1	2–2	0–1	×
vs. Clemson	0–1	2–2	–	3–2	×	1–0	×	×	×	5–1	×	2–3	2–2	1–2	3–0	×	0–1
vs. Duke	×	×	2–3	–	×	×	0–1	2–3	1–3	3–2	0–5	×	×	0–2	3–1	2–3	3–2
vs. Florida State	×	2–2	×	×	–	0–2	0–3	0–1	1–1	4–2	×	×	2–1	0–4	2–3	×	1–4
vs. Louisville	0–1	×	0–1	×	2–0	–	0–2	×	0–3	3–1	×	0–3	×	×	1–1	0–1	1–1
vs. Miami	×	2–0	×	1–0	3–0	2–0	–	1–2	×	×	×	0–0	3–2	1–0	×	0–0	3–1
vs. North Carolina	1–3	×	×	3–2	1–0	×	2–1	–	0–1	4–3	1–3	0–3	×	2–4	×	1–2	×
vs. NC State	0–1	×	×	3–1	1–1	3–0	×	1–0	–	2–1	0–1	0–1	×	×	×	4–4	1–2
vs. Notre Dame	×	×	1–5	2–3	2–4	1–3	×	3–4	1–2	–	1–0	0–3	×	×	×	0–5	1–1
vs. Pittsburgh	1–2	2–1	×	5–0	×	×	×	3–1	1–0	0–1	–	4–0	6–0	×	2–0	×	2–1
vs. SMU	×	1–2	3–2	×	×	3–0	0–0	3–0	1–0	3–0	0–4	–	5–1	1–1	×	×	×
vs. Stanford	0–2	2–8	2–2	×	1–2	×	2–3	×	×	×	0–6	1–5	–	0–4	1–2	0–5	×
vs. Syracuse	1–0	1–0	2–1	2–0	4–0	×	0–1	4–2	×	×	×	1–1	4–0	–	3–0	×	×
vs. Virginia	0–2	2–2	0–3	1–3	3–2	1–1	×	×	×	×	0–2	×	2–1	0–3	–	1–2	×
vs. Virginia Tech	×	1–0	×	3–2		1–0	0–0	2–1	4–4	5–0	×	×	5–0	×	2–1	–	2–1
vs. Wake Forest	0–0	×	1–0	2–3	4–1	1–1	1–3	×	2–1	1–1	1–2	×	×	×	×	1–2	–
Total	1–7–2	4–2–4	4–4–2	7–3–0	6–2–2	6–2–2	1–7–2	6–4–0	4–4–2	8–1–1	2–8–0	2–6–2	9–0–1	1–8–1	6–2–2	0–8–2	4–3–3

× – Matchup not played in 2025

=== Rankings ===
Legend
Increase in ranking
Decrease in ranking
Not ranked previous week

		Pre	Wk 1	Wk 2	Wk 3	Wk 4	Wk 5	Wk 6	Wk 7	Wk 8	Wk 9	Wk 10	Wk 11	Wk 12	Wk 13	Wk 14	Wk 15	Final
Boston College	USC														Not released			
Boston College	TDS																	
California	USC	RV							RV						Not released			
California	TDS											21	17					
Clemson	USC	RV	RV		RV	RV	RV					RV	25	24	Not released			RV
Clemson	TDS																	
Duke	USC	4	1 (3)	3 (1)	3	2	3	9	14	14т	9	7	10	11	Not released			3 (1)
Duke	TDS	5	3	3	2	4	5	7	14	14	10	11	10	9	10	10	6	4
Florida State	USC	3	3 (2)	6т	7	7	7	6	6	5	7	11	6	6	Not released			1 (7)
Florida State	TDS	4	2	2	6	2	2	6	6	5	5	9	5	6	7	7	5	1
Louisville	USC					RV	RV	RV	23	RV	RV	20т	21	20	Not released			24
Louisville	TDS					20	22	14	10	11	15	16	14	15	20	19	22	22
Miami	USC														Not released			
Miami	TDS																	
NC State	USC														Not released			
NC State	TDS																	
North Carolina	USC	1 (8)	12	22	23	19	18	22	19	19	23	23	RV		Not released			13т
North Carolina	TDS	1	6	15	19	14	11	11	19	17	23	18				25	16	16
Notre Dame	USC	2	7т	6т	5	6	6	2	2	2	1 (8)	1 (8)	1 (8)	2	Not released			11
Notre Dame	TDS	3	8	6	5	1	1	1	1	1	1	1	2	2	2	2	17	17
Pittsburgh	USC														Not released			
Pittsburgh	TDS																	
SMU	USC														Not released			
SMU	TDS																	
Stanford	USC	7	2 (3)	1 (3)	1 (6)	3	2 (1)	3	3	3	2	2	2	1 (8)	Not released			2
Stanford	TDS	2	1	1	1	6	7	5	5	4	2	2	1	1	1	1	1	2
Syracuse	USC														Not released			
Syracuse	TDS																	
Virginia	USC	15	17	13т	8	5	1 (7)	1 (8)	1 (8)	1 (8)	3	3	7	7	Not released			8
Virginia	TDS		24	21	13	7	3	2	2	2	3	6	8	7	8	8	10	10
Virginia Tech	USC	14	15	24	20	RV									Not released			
Virginia Tech	TDS	10	9	24														
Wake Forest	USC	10	10	19	17	18	16	19	12	13	17т	RV	RV	RV	Not released			RV
Wake Forest	TDS	18	17	20	24	25	20	22	12	20	18							

=== Players of the Week ===
Week	Date Awarded	Offensive Player of the week	Defensive Player of the week	Reference
1	August 19	Mia Minestrella – Duke	Elise Evans – Stanford	
1	August 19	Mia Minestrella – Duke	Valentina Amaral – Wake Forest	
2	August 26	Mackenzie Geigle – Louisville	Victoria Safradin – Virginia	
3	September 2	Devin Lynch – Duke	Cameron Roller – Duke	
3	September 2	Laney Matriano – Notre Dame	Cameron Roller – Duke	
4	September 9	Amelia Swinarski – Louisville	Teagan Wy – California	
4	September 9	Annabelle Chukwu – Notre Dame	Teagan Wy – California	
5	September 16	Ella Carter – Virginia	Janet Okeke – Florida State	
6	September 23	Annabelle Chukwu (2) – Notre Dame	Olivia Pratapas – NC State	
7	September 30	Izzy Engle – Notre Dame	Teagan Wy (2) – California	
7	September 30	Kylie Maxwell – Wake Forest	Teagan Wy (2) – California	
8	October 7	Jade Bordeleau – NC State	Olivia Pratapas (2) – NC State	
8	October 7	Olivia Thomas – North Carolina	Olivia Pratapas (2) – NC State	
9	October 14	Jasmine Aikey – Stanford	Teagan Wy (3) – California	
10	October 21	Andrea Kitahata – Stanford	Teagan Wy (4) – California	
11	October 28	Jordynn Dudley – Florida State	Erynn Floyd – Louisville	
11	October 28	Izzy Engle (2) – Notre Dame	Erynn Floyd – Louisville	
12	October 31	Jasmine Aikey (2) – Stanford	Abby Reisz – Pittsburgh	

== Postseason ==
=== ACC Tournament ===
Semifinals
1	Stanford	3
5	Virginia	2
2	Notre Dame	2
3	Duke	1

Final
1	Stanford (pen.)	2 (5)
2	Notre Dame	2 (4)

=== NCAA tournament ===
Seed	School	Region	1st Round	2nd Round	Round of 16	Quarterfinals	Semifinals	Championship
1	Stanford	Stanford	W 5–1 vs. Cal Poly – (Stanford)	W 7–3 vs. (8) Alabama – (Stanford)	W 6–0 vs. (5) BYU – (Stanford)	W 5–1 vs. (2) Michigan State – (Stanford)	W 1–0 vs. (2) Duke – (Kansas City)	L 0–1 vs. (3) Florida State – (Kansas City)
1	Notre Dame	Notre Dame	W 4–0 vs. UIC – (Notre Dame)	L 0–1 (2OT) vs. Ohio State – (Notre Dame)				
1	Virginia	Virginia	W 5–0 vs. High Point – (Charlottesville)	W 2–0 vs. (8) Penn State – (Charlottesville)	T 1–1 (4–5 PKs) vs. (4) Washington – (Charlottesville)			
2	Duke	Virginia	W 3–0 vs. Elon – (Durham)	W 1–0 vs. (7) UCF – (Durham)	W 2–0 vs. (3) Kansas – (Durham)	W 3–0 vs. (4) Washington – (Durham)	L 0–1 vs. (1) Stanford – (Kansas City)	
3	Florida State	Notre Dame	W 4–0 vs. Samford – (Tallahassee)	W 1–0 vs. Lipscomb – (Washington, D.C.)	W 3–1 @ (2) Georgetown – (Washington, D.C.)	W 4–1 vs. Ohio State – (Tallahassee)	W 1–0 vs. (2) TCU – (Kansas City)	W 1–0 vs. (1) Stanford – (Kansas City)
6	Louisivlle	Virginia	T 1–1 (5–4 PKs) vs. Kentucky – (Louisville)	L 1–3 vs. (3) Kansas – (Durham)				
7	Wake Forest	Stanford	W 2–1 vs. South Carolina – (Winston-Salem)	L 0–1 @ (2) Michigan State – (East Lansing)				
8	Clemson	Vanderbilt	W 2–1 vs. Liberty – (Clemson)	L 2–3 (2OT) @ (1) Vanderbilt – (Nashville)				
—	North Carolina	Vanderbilt	W 3–1 @ (3) Tennessee – (Knoxville)	T 1–1 (4–3 PKs) vs. (6) Texas Tech – (Fort Worth)	T 1–1 (3–4 PKs)@ (2) TCU – (Fort Worth)			
W–L (%):			8–0–1 (.944)	4–4–1 (.500)	3–0–2 (.800)	3–0–0 (1.000)	2–1–0 (.667)	1–1–0 (.500) Total: 21–6–4 (.742)

== Awards and honors ==
Conference end of season awards were released on November 5, 2025, prior to the semifinals of the ACC Tournament. Izzy Engle was named Offensive Player of the Year, Lia Godfrey won Midfielder of the Year, Elise Evans won Defensive Player of the Year, Caroline Birkel won Goalkeeper of the Year, and Paul Ratcliffe was named Coach of the Year. A full list of award winners and All-ACC Teams is shown below.

=== ACC Awards ===
2025 ACC Women's Soccer Individual Awards
Award	Recipient(s)
Coach of the Year	Paul Ratcliffe – Stanford
Offensive Player of the Year	Izzy Engle – Notre Dame
Midfielder of the Year	Lia Godfrey – Virginia
Defensive Player of the Year	Elise Evans – Stanford
Goalkeeper of the Year	Caroline Birkel – Stanford
Freshman of the Year	Kylie Maxwell – Wake Forest

2025 ACC Women's Soccer All-Conference Teams
First Team	Second Team	Third Team	All-Freshman Team
Mia Minestrella – Duke; Jordynn Dudley – Florida State; Olivia Thomas – North Carolina; Annabelle Chukwu – Notre Dame; Izzy Engle – Notre Dame; Leah Klenke – Notre Dame; Jasmine Aikey – Stanford; Caroline Birkel – Stanford; Elise Evans – Stanford; Andrea Kitahata – Stanford; Lia Godfrey – Virginia	Kat Rader – Duke; Wrianna Hudson – Florida State; Taylor Suarez – Florida State; Karsyn Cherry – Louisville; Amelia Swinarski – Louisville; Jade Bordeleau – NC State; Shae Harvey – Stanford; Charlotte Kohler – Stanford; Maggie Cagle – Virginia; Laney Rouse – Virginia; Victoria Safradin – Virginia	JuJu Harris – Clemson; Carina Lageyre – Duke; Cameron Roller – Duke; Heather Gilchrist – Florida State; Mimi Van Zanten – Florida State; Emersen Jennings – Louisville; Kate Faasse – North Carolina; Linda Ullmark – North Carolina; Grace Restovich – Notre Dame; Valentina Amaral – Wake Forest; Kylie Maxwell – Wake Forest	JuJu Harris – Clemson; Daya King – Duke; Avery Oder – Duke; Hope Munson – North Carolina; Tessa Knapp – Notre Dame; Caroline Birkel – Stanford; Y-Lan Nguyen – Stanford; Addison Halpern – Virginia; Liv Rademaker – Virginia; Allie Flanagan – Wake Forest; Kylie Maxwell – Wake Forest

=== All-Americans ===
2025 United Soccer Coaches All-Americans
First Team	Second Team	Third Team	Fourth Team
Elise Evans – Stanford; Leah Klenke – Notre Dame; Lia Godfrey – Virginia; Kat Rader – Duke; Jasmine Aikey – Stanford; Jordynn Dudley – Florida State; Izzy Engle – Notre Dame	Karsyn Cherry – Louisville; Annabelle Chukwu – Notre Dame; Mia Minestrella – Duke	Valentina Amaral – Wake Forest; Heather Gilchrist – Florida State; Charlotte Kohler – Stanford; Olivia Thomas – North Carolina	Laney Rouse – Virginia; Linda Ullmark – North Carolina
