= Shae Harvey =

American soccer player (born 2005)

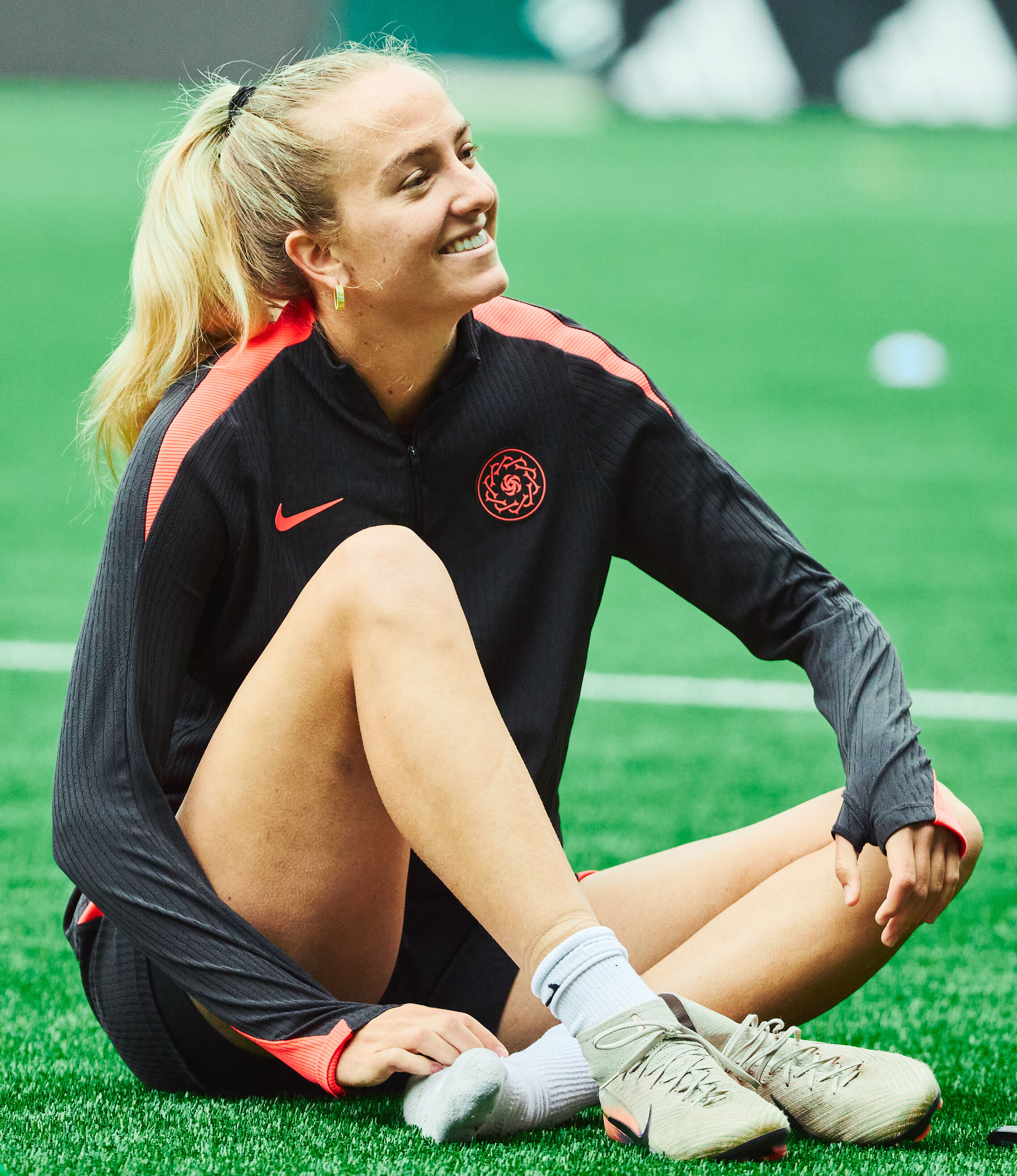
- Harvey with the Portland Thorns in 2026

Personal information
- Full name: Shae Ann Harvey
- Date of birth: March 1, 2005 (age 21)
- Height: 5 ft 10 in (1.78 m)
- Position: Central midfielder

Team information
- Current team: Portland Thorns
- Number: 15

Youth career
- Beach FC
- 2019–2023: Slammers FC HB Køge

College career
| Years | Team | Apps | (Gls) |
| 2023–2025 | Stanford Cardinal | 73 | (11) |

Senior career*
| Years | Team | Apps | (Gls) |
| 2026– | Portland Thorns | 9 | (1) |

International career^{‡}
| 2022 | United States U-17 | 5 | (4) |
| 2024 | United States U-19 | 2 | (0) |
| 2023–2024 | United States U-20 | 3 | (0) |
| 2026– | United States U-23 | 1 | (0) |
- * Club domestic league appearances and goals as of 17:57, November 11, 2026 (UTC) ‡ National team caps and goals as of 14:17, March 8, 2026 (UTC)

Shae Ann Harvey (born March 1, 2005) is an American professional soccer player who plays as a midfielder for Portland Thorns FC of the National Women's Soccer League (NWSL). She played college soccer for the Stanford Cardinal.

== Early life ==
Harvey grew up in Hermosa Beach, California, the daughter of Diana and Jackson Harvey. Her sister, Maya, played beach volleyball at Stanford. Harvey played club soccer for Beach FC and Slammers FC HB Køge, earning ECNL All-American honors three times and winning the ECNL under-19 national title with Slammers in 2023. She attended Mira Costa High School, where she ran track. She committed to Stanford during her junior year. She also trained with NWSL club Angel City FC as a non-roster trialist in the 2023 preseason. TopDrawerSoccer ranked her as the No. 12 prospect of the 2023 class, part of Stanford's third-ranked recruiting class.

== College career ==
Harvey started every game for the Stanford Cardinal in her freshman season in 2023, playing 25 games and scoring 1 goal. She contributed to the team going undefeated in the regular season and then reaching the NCAA tournament final, where they lost 5–1 to Florida State. She was named to the Pac-12 Conference all-freshman team, earned third-team All-Pac-12 honors, and was named in the NCAA all-tournament team. TopDrawerSoccer named her the second-best freshman in the nation.

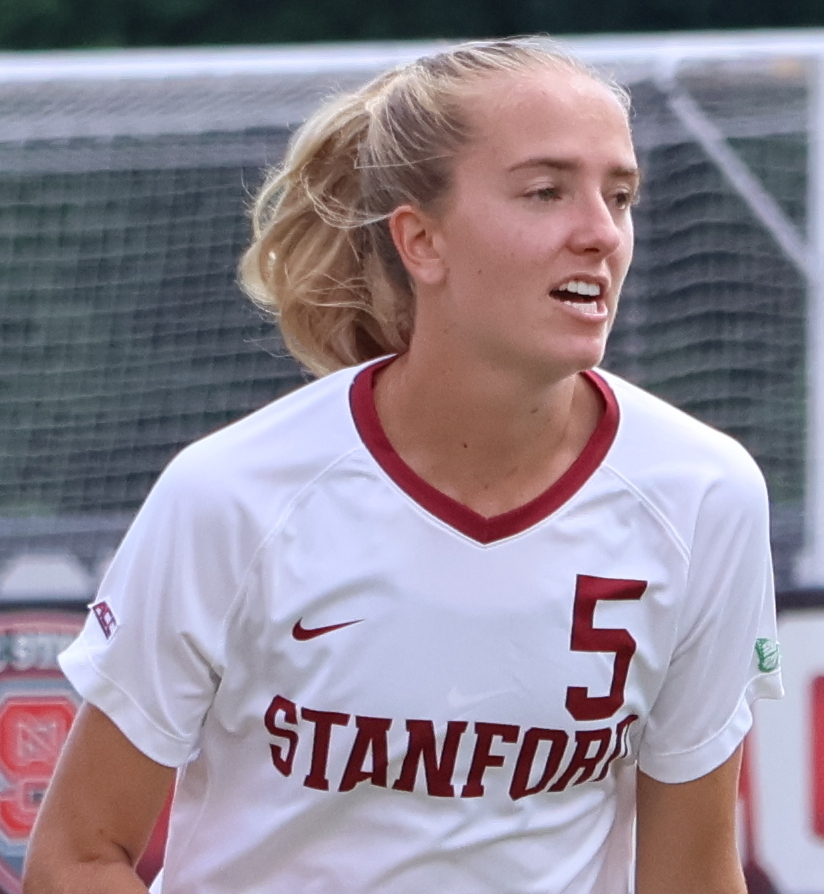
Harvey playing for Stanford in 2024

Harvey scored 5 goals in 23 games in her sophomore season in 2024, the Cardinal's first campaign in the Atlantic Coast Conference (ACC). She scored important goals during the NCAA tournament, with a late equalizer against UConn, the decisive penalty in a shootout against Arkansas, and the opening header against Notre Dame, as Stanford returned to the semifinals, where they lost to Wake Forest.

Harvey started all 25 goals and scored 5 goals with 10 assists in her junior year in 2025, earning second-team All-ACC recognition. She co-captained the Cardinal to both the ACC regular-season and tournament titles, converting a penalty in the final shootout against Notre Dame. She then helped lead another deep run to the NCAA tournament final, losing 1–0 again to Florida State, and was named in the NCAA all-tournament team. After three seasons in Palo Alto, she decided to turn pro and give up her remaining college eligibility.

== Club career ==
The Portland Thorns announced on December 29, 2025, that they had signed Harvey to her first professional contract on a three-year deal. She made her professional debut on March 13, 2026, playing 30 minutes as a substitute for Cassandra Bogere in a season-opening 1–0 win against the Washington Spirit. She scored her first professional goal on October 3, making the score 3–2 in an eventual 4–2 loss to the Boston Legacy.

== International career ==
Harvey was called into training with the United States under-15 team in 2019. After the youth national team went on hiatus during the COVID-19 pandemic, she returned to train with the under-17 team in 2021. She scored four goals in a record win against Grenada at the 2022 CONCACAF Women's U-17 Championship. She played in four games for the tournament victors but did not make the roster for the subsequent 2022 FIFA U-17 Women's World Cup. She played three games for the under-20 team at the 2023 CONCACAF Women's U-20 Championship, placing second to Mexico. She played friendlies for the under-19 team against Spain in 2024.

== Honors and awards ==
Stanford Cardinal

- Atlantic Coast Conference: 2025
- ACC tournament: 2025

United States U-17

- CONCACAF Women's U-17 Championship: 2022

United States U-20

- CONCACAF Women's U-20 Championship runner-up: 2023

Individual

- Second-team All-ACC: 2025
- Third-team All-Pac-12: 2023
- Pac-12 all-freshman team: 2023
- NCAA tournament all-tournament team: 2023, 2025
