= Mia Bhuta =

American soccer player (born 2005)

- Bhuta with Stanford in 2026

Personal information
- Full name: Mia Elizabeth Bhuta
- Date of birth: December 29, 2005 (age 20)
- Place of birth: Mt. Lebanon, Pennsylvania
- Height: 5 ft 4 in (1.63 m)
- Positions: Midfielder; defender

Team information
- Current team: Stanford Cardinal

College career
| Years | Team | Apps | (Gls) |
| 2023– | Stanford Cardinal | 70 | (5) |

International career
| 2022 | United States U-17 | 15 | (3) |
| 2024– | United States U-19 | 1 | (0) |

Mia Elizabeth Bhuta (born December 29, 2005) is an American college soccer player who plays as a midfielder or defender for the Stanford Cardinal. She represented the United States at the 2022 FIFA U-17 Women's World Cup, becoming the first Indian American to play at a FIFA tournament.

== Early life ==
Bhuta was born and raised in the Pittsburgh suburb of Mt. Lebanon, one of three children of Joy and Vyom Bhuta. Her father, born in Mumbai into a Gujarati family and raised in Rajkot, moved to New York as an exchange student to train in tennis at age 16; her mother grew up in Pittsburgh. Her parents met at Mercyhurst University, where her father played college tennis and her mother rowed. Her brother, Noah, is a college football punter for Chicago.

Bhuta started playing soccer with her father and brother at a young age before joining the Riverhounds Development Academy and Century United. She then joined Internationals Soccer Club at age 11, for which her family drove her to the club in Medina, Ohio, multiple times a week for years; she won two ECNL conference titles with the team and was named an ECNL All-American in 2022. She initially committed to UCLA, but after its coach left, she switched to Stanford in late 2021. She graduated one year early from Mt. Lebanon High School in 2022, allowing her to enroll early at Stanford. Ranked as the fourth-top player in her class, she signed a name, image, and likeness (NIL) deal with Adidas at age 17.

== College career ==
Bhuta featured in the starting lineup of all but one game for the Stanford Cardinal in her freshman season in 2023. She scored her first college goal in a 1–0 win over Washington State. She was deployed as a midfielder at the start of the season but moved to the back line by the end of the year. Stanford went undefeated all the way to the final of the NCAA tournament, where they lost to Florida State. After the season, Bhuta was named to the All-Pac-12 Conference third team and received all-freshman recognition from the Pac-12, TopDrawerSoccer, and College Soccer News. She started every game in the midfield as a sophomore in 2024, earning second-team All-ACC honors, and helped the Cardinal to the NCAA tournament semifinals. She moved again to defense, playing as an inverted right back, in her junior season in 2025.

== International career ==
Bhuta was first called into training camp with the United States under-15 team in 2020 and joined the under-17s the following year. She captained the under-17s on her international debut at the 2022 CONCACAF Women's U-17 Championship. The United States outscored its opposition 58–1 in seven games to win the tournament, qualifying for the 2022 FIFA U-17 Women's World Cup. At age 16, Bhuta was one of three captains for the United States at that World Cup held in India, where she became the first player of Indian descent, male or female, to play for the United States at a FIFA tournament at any age level. She came off the bench and scored in the opening 8–0 win over the hosts. The United States played Nigeria to a 1–1 draw in the quarterfinals; the team lost in a penalty shootout in which Bhuta converted her penalty kick.

== Honors and awards ==
Stanford Cardinal

- Atlantic Coast Conference: 2025
- ACC tournament: 2025

United States U17

- CONCACAF Women's U-17 Championship: 2022

Individual

- Second-team All-ACC: 2024
- Third-team All-Pac-12: 2023
