= Jasmine Aikey =

American soccer player (born 2005)

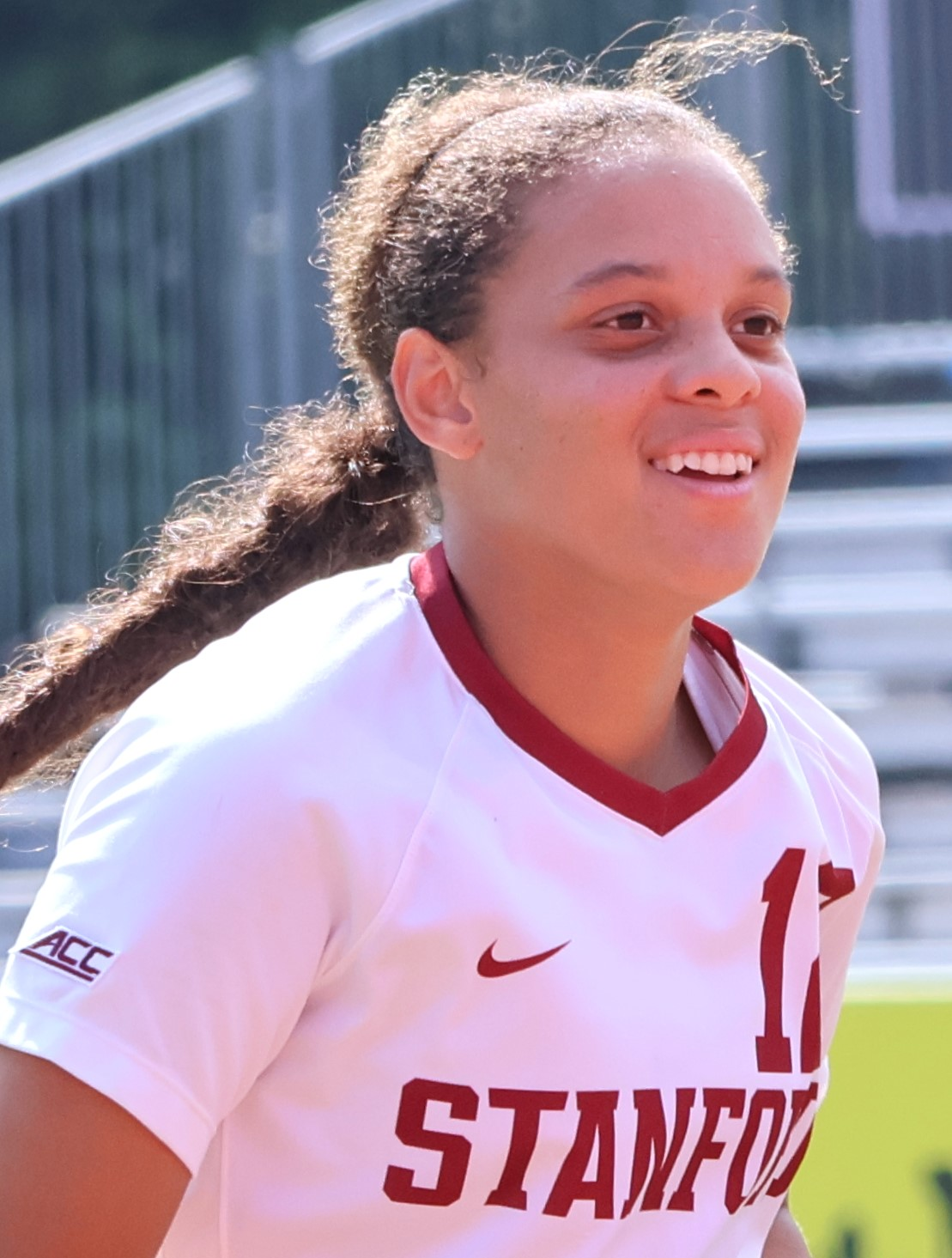
- Aikey with Stanford in 2024

Personal information
- Full name: Jasmine Annemarie Aikey
- Date of birth: July 7, 2005 (age 21)
- Height: 5 ft 10 in (1.78 m)
- Positions: Forward; midfielder; center back

Team information
- Current team: Denver Summit
- Number: 12

Youth career
- San Jose Earthquakes
- MVLA

College career
Years	Team	Apps	(Gls)
2022–2025	Stanford Cardinal	89	(43)

Senior career*
Years	Team	Apps	(Gls)
2023	San Francisco Glens	6	(4)
2026–	Denver Summit	0	(0)

International career^{‡}
2023	United States U-20	5	(1)
- * Club domestic league appearances and goals ‡ National team caps and goals as of June 4, 2023

Jasmine Annemarie Aikey (born July 7, 2005) is an American professional soccer player who plays as a forward for Denver Summit FC of the National Women's Soccer League (NWSL). She played college soccer for the Stanford Cardinal, winning the Hermann Trophy in 2025. She has represented the United States at the youth international level.

== Early life ==
Aikey was born in Burlingame, California, to Merline Saintil and Greg Aikey, and grew up in Palo Alto. She began playing soccer with the AYSO and had spells with multiple clubs before moving to the San Jose Earthquakes's academy. She tore the meniscus in her knee when she was twelve. She then joined MVLA Soccer Club, where she played alongside future Stanford teammates Elise Evans and Allie Montoya. She won the DA under-15 national championship in 2019 and the ECNL under-17 national title in 2021, scoring the only goal in the latter final. She graduated from Bryant Academy in Palo Alto in 2022. During college, she also played for USL W League club San Francisco Glens, reaching the national semifinals in 2023.

== College career ==
Aikey led the Stanford Cardinal in scoring with 10 goals in 22 games as a freshman in 2022, helping the team win the Pac-12 Conference and earning second-team All-Pac-12 honors. She scored a hat trick against Oregon State and took a four-goal haul in the NCAA tournament first round. She underwent a second knee surgery after her freshman season.

Aikey scored directly from a corner against St. Mary's early in her sophomore season in 2023. She scored a hat trick in the regular season finale against rivals California. In the NCAA tournament, she had an assist in every game as Stanford reached the final, losing to Florida State to end their otherwise undefeated season. Aikey finished her sophomore season with 11 goals and led the Pac-12 with 12 assists in 25 games. She was named the Pac-12 Midfielder of the Year, first-team All-Pac-12, and first-team All-American.

Previously a midfielder, Aikey mostly played center back during her junior season in 2024, the Cardinal's first year in the Atlantic Coast Conference. She managed pain throughout the season and was diagnosed with osteitis pubis, then fractured her fibula in the penultimate regular-season game. She was named second-team All-ACC after starting 17 games and scoring 1 goal.

Aikey returned to the field playing as a striker in her senior season in 2025, scoring 21 goals (third in the nation) with 11 assists in 25 games. She helped lead the Cardinal to the ACC regular-season and tournament titles, scoring in both rounds in the tournament and being named tournament MVP. She scored six goals in the NCAA tournament as the Cardinal reached the final, again losing to Florida State. She was named first-team All-ACC, first-team All-American, and the TopDrawerSoccer National Player of the Year, and won the Hermann Trophy.

== Club career ==
NWSL expansion team Denver Summit FC announced on January 8, 2026, that they had signed Aikey to her first professional contract on a two-year deal with the mutual option for another year. On March 23, the Summit announced that Aikey had torn the anterior cruciate ligament (ACL) in her right knee and would miss the club's inaugural season.

== International career ==
Aikey was invited to training camps with the United States youth national team at the under-14, under-15, and under-17 levels before being selected to the under-20 roster for the 2023 CONCACAF Women's U-20 Championship. She scored her first under-20 international goal in the tournament semifinals, opening in a 2–1 win over Costa Rica; the United States fell to Mexico in the final.

== Honors and awards ==
Stanford Cardinal

- Atlantic Coast Conference: 2025
- ACC tournament: 2025
- Pac-12 Conference: 2022

Individual

- Hermann Trophy: 2025
- TopDrawerSoccer National Player of the Year: 2025
- First-team All-American: 2023, 2025
- First-team All-ACC: 2025
- First-team All-Pac-12: 2023
- Second-team All-ACC: 2024
- Second-team All-Pac-12: 2022
- Pac-12 Midfielder of the Year: 2023
- ACC tournament MVP: 2025
