= 2025 ACC women's soccer tournament =

Soccer tournament

- Classification: Division I
- Teams: 6
- Matches: 5
- Attendance: 3,743
- Quarterfinals site: Campus Sites
- Semifinals site: First Horizon Stadium; Cary, North Carolina
- Finals site: First Horizon Stadium; Cary, North Carolina
- Champions: Stanford (1st title)
- Winning coach: Paul Ratcliffe (1st title)
- MVP: Jasmine Aikey (Stanford)
- Broadcast: ACCN (Quarterfinals & Semifinals), ESPNU (Final)

2025 ACC women's soccer standings
	Conf.						Overall
Team	W		L		T	PCT	W		L		T	PCT
No. 2 Stanford ‍†‍‡‍^{y}	9	–	0	–	1	.950	21	–	2	–	2	.880
No. 11 Notre Dame ‍‍‍^{y}	8	–	1	–	1	.850	15	–	2	–	3	.825
No. 3 Duke ‍‍‍^{y}	7	–	3	–	0	.700	17	–	5	–	1	.761
No. 1 Florida State ‍‍‍^{y}	6	–	2	–	2	.700	16	–	2	–	4	.818
No. 8 Virginia ‍‍‍^{y}	6	–	2	–	2	.700	14	–	3	–	5	.750
No. 24 Louisville ‍‍‍^{y}	6	–	2	–	2	.700	13	–	5	–	3	.690
No. 13т North Carolina ‍‍‍^{y}	6	–	4	–	0	.600	13	–	6	–	2	.667
California ‍‍‍	4	–	2	–	4	.600	8	–	3	–	8	.632
Wake Forest ‍‍‍^{y}	4	–	3	–	3	.550	11	–	5	–	4	.650
NC State ‍‍‍	4	–	4	–	2	.500	5	–	9	–	4	.389
Clemson ‍‍‍^{y}	4	–	4	–	2	.500	8	–	6	–	5	.553
SMU ‍‍‍	2	–	6	–	2	.300	8	–	8	–	2	.500
Pittsburgh ‍‍‍	2	–	8	–	0	.200	6	–	10	–	2	.389
Miami (FL) ‍‍‍	1	–	7	–	2	.200	7	–	8	–	3	.472
Boston College ‍‍‍	1	–	7	–	2	.200	5	–	8	–	5	.417
Syracuse ‍‍‍	1	–	8	–	1	.150	5	–	9	–	4	.389
Virginia Tech ‍‍‍	0	–	8	–	2	.100	4	–	10	–	4	.333
† – Conference champion ‡ – 2025 ACC Tournament champion y – Invited to the NCAA Tournament; As of December 9, 2025; Rankings from United Soccer Coaches Poll; Source: The ACC

The 2025 Atlantic Coast Conference women's soccer tournament, known as the Ally ACC Women’s Soccer Championship for sponsorship reasons, was the postseason women's soccer tournament for the Atlantic Coast Conference, held November 2-9, 2025. The five-match tournament took place at campus sites for the two quarterfinals and First Horizon Stadium at WakeMed Soccer Park in Cary, North Carolina for the semifinals and final. The higher seed hosted the campus site matches. The six-team single-elimination tournament consisted of three rounds based on seeding from regular season conference play. The Florida State Seminoles were the five-time defending champions. The Seminoles were unable to defend their title, as they lost in a penalty shoot-out in the quarterfinals. The final was contested by the first seed Stanford and second seed Notre Dame, who were also the first and second nationally ranked teams in the United Soccer Coaches poll at the time of the match. The teams played to a 2–2 draw, and Stanford prevailed 5–4 in the ensuing penalty shoot-out. This was Stanford's first ACC tournament title after they joined the conference last year, and also the first ACC title for head coach Paul Ratcliffe. As tournament champions, Stanford earned the ACC's automatic berth into the 2025 NCAA Division I women's soccer tournament.

== Qualification ==
The top six teams in the Atlantic Coast Conference earned a berth into the ACC tournament. The top two teams earned a bye to the semifinals. The final seedings were determined after the final day of the regular season on October 30, 2025. A three-way tiebreaker was required to determine the fourth, fifth, and sixth seeds, as Florida State, Louisville, and Virginia all finished with twenty conference points from 6–2–2 records. Florida State defeated both Louisville and Virginia on September 11 and October 23, respectively, and thus earned the fourth seed. Louisville and Virginia tied their regular season match 1–1 on October 18 and therefore went to a second tiebreaker. They each had three wins against common opponents, which was the second tiebreaker, so the ranking moved to the third tiebreaker, goal difference. Virginia finished with a +11 goal difference while Louisville finished with a +7 goal difference, so Virginia was the fifth seed and Louisville the sixth seed.

Seed	School	Conference Record	Points
1	Stanford	9–0–1	28
2	Notre Dame	8–1–1	25
3	Duke	7–3–0	21
4	Florida State	6–2–2	20
5	Virginia	6–2–2	20
6	Louisville	6–2–2	20

== Bracket ==
First Round; November 2 ACCN
4	Florida State	0 (5)
5	Virginia (pen.)	0 (6)
3	Duke	1
6	Louisville	0

Semifinal; November 6 ACCN
1	Stanford	3
5	Virginia	2
2	Notre Dame	2
3	Duke	1

Championship; November 9 ESPNU
1	Stanford (pen.)	2 (5)
2	Notre Dame	2 (4)

== Schedule ==
=== Quarterfinals ===
November 2, 2025	(3) Duke	1–0	(6) Louisville	Durham, North Carolina
6:00 p.m. EST	Devin Lynch 12'	Box Score		Stadium: Koskinen Stadium; Attendance: 337; Referee: Nick Balcer; Assistant referees: Benjamin Wooten; Hillis Waddell; Fourth official: JC Griggs

November 2, 2025	(4) Florida State	0–0 (a.e.t.) (5–6 p)	(5) Virginia	Tallahassee, Florida
8:00 p.m. EST	Jordynn Dudley (yellow card) 41'; Team (yellow card) 58', (yellow card) 65'; Jaida McGrew (yellow card) 65'	Box Score	(yellow card) 42' Maggie Cagle; (yellow card) 100' Team	Stadium: Seminole Soccer Complex; Attendance: 1,072; Referee: Ashley Cedro; Assistant referees: Fritz Barberousse; Dean Morgan; Fourth official: Jonathan Bilinski
	Penalties
	Jordynn Dudley (penalty scored); Wrianna Hudson (penalty scored); Taylor Suarez (penalty scored); Heather Gilchrist (penalty scored); Nyanya Touray (penalty scored); Giana Riley (penalty missed)		(penalty scored) Maggie Cagle; (penalty scored) Ella Carter; (penalty scored) Jordyn Hardeman; (penalty scored) Pearl Cecil; (penalty scored) Addison Halpern; (penalty scored) Maya Carter

=== Semifinals ===
November 6, 2025	(2) Notre Dame	2–1	(3) Duke	Cary, North Carolina
5:30 p.m. EST	Izzy Engle 27'; Annabelle Chukwu 88'	Box Score	41' Kat Rader	Stadium: WakeMed Soccer Park; Referee: Richonne Clark; Assistant referees: Jennifer Dumaine; Cecilia Chavez; Fourth official: Kaitlyn Trowbridge

November 6, 2025	(1) Stanford	3–2	(5) Virginia	Cary, North Carolina
8:00 p.m. EST	Charlotte Kohler 9', 31'; Jasmine Aikey 45'	Box Score	58' Meredith McDermott; 85' (pen.) Maggie Cagle	Stadium: WakeMed Soccer Park; Attendance: 1,077; Referee: Daniel Radford; Assistant referees: Jade Mallea; Elizabeth McDonald; Fourth official: Kaitlyn Trowbridge

=== Final ===
November 9, 2025	(1) Stanford	2–2 (a.e.t.) (5–4 p)	(2) Notre Dame	Cary, North Carolina
12:00 p.m. EST	Lizzie Boamah (yellow card) 2'; Allie Montoya 29'; Lily Freer (yellow card) 38'; Jasmine Aikey 47'	Box Score	(yellow card) 25' Laney Matriano; 69' Izzy Engle; 75' Charlie Codd; (yellow card) 90' Team; (yellow card) 99' Abby Mills	Stadium: WakeMed Soccer Park; Attendance: 1,257; Referee: Nicole Green; Assistant referees: Tiffani Turpin; Shaye Lane; Fourth official: Kevin Maurer
	Penalties
	Andrea Kitahata (penalty scored); Shae Harvey (penalty scored); Y-Lan Nguyen (penalty scored); Mia Bhuta (penalty scored); Allie Montoya (penalty missed); Charlotte Kohler (penalty scored)		(penalty scored) Leah Klenke; (penalty scored) Tessa Knapp; (penalty scored) Izzy Engle; (penalty missed) Morgan Roy; (penalty scored) Laney Matriano; (penalty missed) Charlie Codd

== Statistics ==
=== Goalscorers ===
There were 13 goals scored in 5 matches, for an average of 2.6 goals per match.

2 goals

- (United States) Izzy Engle – Notre Dame
- (United States) Jasmine Aikey – Stanford
- (United States) Charlotte Kohler – Stanford

1 goal

- (United States) Devin Lynch – Duke
- (United States) Kat Rader – Duke
- (Canada) Annabelle Chukwu – Notre Dame
- (United States) Charlie Codd – Notre Dame
- (United States) Allie Montoya – Stanford
- (United States) Maggie Cagle – Virginia
- (United States) Meredith McDermott – Virginia

== All-Tournament team ==
Player	Team
2025 ACC Women's Soccer All-Tournament team
Kat Rader	Duke
Annabelle Chukwu	Notre Dame
Charlie Codd	Notre Dame
Izzy Engle	Notre Dame
Leah Klenke	Notre Dame
Jasmine Aikey	Stanford
Elise Evans	Stanford
Andrea Kitahata	Stanford
Charlotte Kohler	Stanford
Meredith McDermott	Virginia
Victoria Safradin	Virginia

Most Valuable Player: Jasmine Aikey
