= Elise Evans =

American soccer player (born 2004)

- Evans with the Chicago Stars in 2026

Personal information
- Full name: Elise Aminta Evans
- Date of birth: December 16, 2004 (age 21)
- Place of birth: Stanford, California, U.S.
- Height: 5 ft 7 in (1.70 m)
- Position: Center back

Team information
- Current team: Chicago Stars
- Number: 15

Youth career
- San Jose Earthquakes
- 2020–2022: Bay Area Surf

College career
Years	Team	Apps	(Gls)
2022–2025	Stanford Cardinal	77	(10)

Senior career*
Years	Team	Apps	(Gls)
2026–	Chicago Stars	2	(0)

International career^{‡}
2019	United States U-15	6	(1)
2020	United States U-16	5	(2)
2023–2024	United States U-20	17	(0)
Medal record
Women's soccer
FIFA U-20 Women's World Cup
Bronze medal – third place	Colombia 2024
- * Club domestic league appearances and goals as of 05:36, November 2, 2026 (UTC) ‡ National team caps and goals as of September 21, 2024

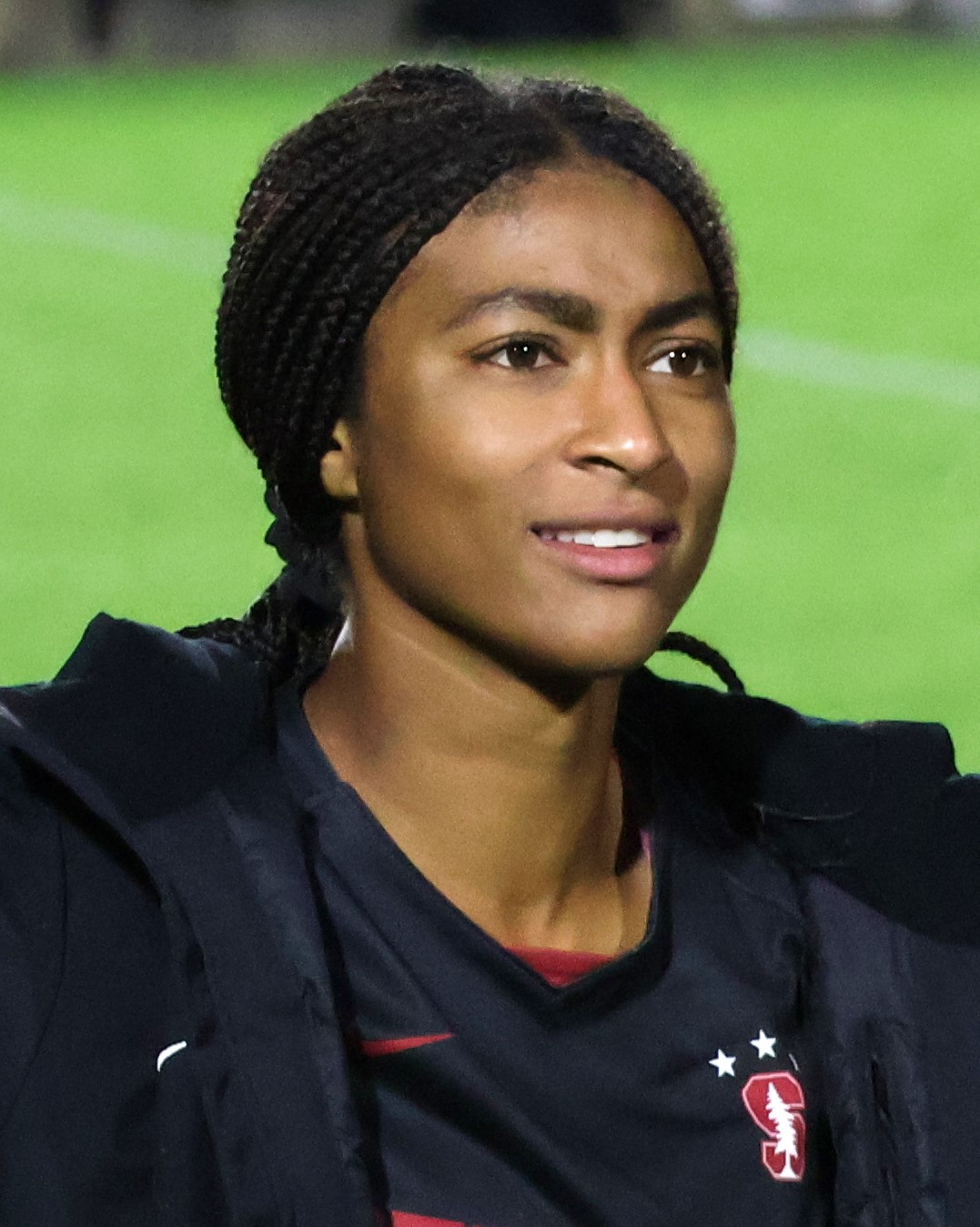
Evans with Stanford in 2025

Elise Aminta Evans (born December 16, 2004) is an American professional soccer player who plays as a center back for Chicago Stars FC of the National Women's Soccer League (NWSL). She played college soccer for the Stanford Cardinal, earning first-team All-American honors in 2025. She won bronze with the United States at the 2024 FIFA U-20 Women's World Cup.

== Early life ==
Raised in Redwood City, California, Evans played for the San Jose Earthquakes academy team before joining Bay Area Surf, which she captained. She helped win the Girls' Development Academy under-16 national championship in 2019 and the Girls Academy under-19 title in 2022, where she received the tournament's Golden Ball. She attended Woodside High School, where she scored 18 goals in 12 games playing both defense or forward in her senior year in 2022, being named the California Gatorade Player of the Year and USA Today and Just Women's Sports All-American. She committed to Stanford as a freshman and was considered the top recruit of the class of 2022 by TopDrawerSoccer. Evans also competed for the San Francisco Glens as the club's first-ever player in the USL W League, helping lead the team to the NorCal Division and Western Conference titles as well as the National Semifinals in 2023.

== College career ==
Evans was an immediate starter for the Stanford Cardinal as a freshman in 2022. She contributed to one of the country's top defenses, recording 12 shutouts in 19 games, and added three game-winning goals as the Cardinal claimed the Pac-12 Conference title. She was recognized as the Pac-12 Freshman of the Year, first-team All-Pac 12, and TopDrawerSoccer National Freshman of the Year. She led the team in minutes played as a sophomore in 2023, helping the team to a near-undefeated record before falling to Florida State in the NCAA championship title game, and was named second-team All-Pac 12 and United Soccer Coaches third-team All-American.

Despite missing about a month while at the 2024 FIFA U-20 Women's World Cup, Evans was named third-team All-ACC as a junior and helped the Cardinal return to the NCAA tournament semifinals. In her senior year in 2025, she helped lead Stanford to their first ACC regular-season and tournament titles and reach another NCAA tournament final, again losing to Florida State. She was named first-team All-American, first-team All-ACC, and the ACC Defensive Player of the Year.

== Club career ==
Chicago Stars FC announced on January 16, 2026, that they had signed Evans to her first professional contract on a three-year deal. Six months later, on July 24, she made her professional debut as a second-half substitute for Sam Staab in a 1–0 loss to the Orlando Pride.

== International career ==
Evans helped the United States win the 2018 CONCACAF Girls' U-15 Championship. She trained and played friendlies with the under-16 team in 2019 and 2020. She was selected to play at the 2023 CONCACAF Women's U-20 Championship, where she captained the team to qualify for the 2024 FIFA U-20 Women's World Cup. She started in two games at the 2024 FIFA U-20 Women's World Cup as the United States finished in third place, its best result since 2012.

== Personal life ==
Evans was born in Stanford Hospital in a family with a history in college sports at Stanford: Her father, Marlon Evans, played college football and ran track; her mother, Dena (née Dey), played soccer and earned three-time All-American honors in middle-distance track; and her great-grandfather, Ben Dey, won the NCAA doubles tennis title in 1936. Her older sister, Adrienne, played college soccer at Penn.

== Honors and awards ==
Stanford Cardinal

- Atlantic Coast Conference: 2025
- ACC tournament: 2025
- Pac-12 Conference: 2022

United States U-15

- CONCACAF Girls' U-15 Championship: 2018

United States U-20

- FIFA U-20 Women's World Cup bronze medal: 2024

Individual

- First-team All-American: 2025
- Third-team All-American: 2023
- First-team All-ACC: 2025
- First-team All-Pac-12: 2022
- Second-team All-Pac-12: 2023
- Third-team All-ACC: 2024
- ACC Defensive Player of the Year: 2025
- TopDrawerSoccer National Freshman of the Year: 2022
- Pac-12 Freshman of the Year: 2022
- ACC tournament all-tournament team: 2025
