= 2018 CONCACAF Girls' U-15 Championship =

Tournament details
- Host country: United States
- City: Bradenton
- Dates: 6–13 August 2018
- Teams: 28 (from CONCACAF + UEFA confederations)
- Venue(s): 1 (in 1 host city)

Final positions
- Champions: United States (2nd title)
- Runners-up: Mexico

Tournament statistics
- Matches played: 50
- Goals scored: 261 (5.22 per match)
- Top scorer(s): (Saint Kitts and Nevis) Ellie Stokes
- Best player(s): (United States) Jaedyn Shaw
- Best goalkeeper: (Mexico) Azul Álvarez
- Fair play award: Portugal

The 2018 CONCACAF Girls' U-15 Championship was an association football tournament that took place in Bradenton, Florida during August 2018.

The United States won the tournament.

== Teams ==
CFU	Anguilla; Antigua and Barbuda; Bahamas; Bermuda; Barbados; Cayman Islands; Curaçao; Dominica; Dominican Republic; Grenada; Guyana; Haiti; Jamaica; Martinique; Saint Kitts and Nevis; Saint Lucia; Puerto Rico; Saint Vincent and the Grenadines; U.S. Virgin Islands
UNCAF	Belize; Costa Rica; El Salvador; Panama
NAFU	Canada; Mexico; United States
UEFA	Portugal; Northern Ireland

Portugal and Northern Ireland were invitees.

== Venues ==
All matches took place at the IMG Academy campus in Bradenton, Florida.

== Group stage ==
=== Tiebreakers ===
The following tiebreaking criteria were established by CONCACAF:

1. Greatest number of points obtained in all group matches
2. Goal difference in all group matches
3. Greatest number of goals scored in all group matches
4. Greatest number of points obtained in matches amongst teams still tied
5. Lots drawn by the Organizing Committee

=== Group A ===
Pos	Team	Pld	W	D	L	GF	GA	GD	Pts	Qualification
1	Portugal	3	3	0	0	11	1	+10	9	Knockout stage
2	United States (H)	3	2	0	1	16	2	+14	6	Knockout stage
3	El Salvador	3	1	0	2	3	15	−12	3	
4	Jamaica	3	0	0	3	3	15	−12	0	

Source: CONCACAF
Rules for classification: Tiebreakers
(H) Hosts
7 August 2018
9:00

United States	8–0	Jamaica

Field 1, IMG Academy
7 August 2018
9:00

El Salvador	0–5	Portugal

Field 3, IMG Academy

8 August 2018
9:00

Portugal	2–0	United States

Field 1, IMG Academy
8 August 2018
9:00

Jamaica	2–3	El Salvador

Field 3, IMG Academy

10 August 2018
9:00

El Salvador	0–8	United States

Field 1, IMG Academy
10 August 2018
9:00

Portugal	4–1	Jamaica

Field 3, IMG Academy

=== Group B ===
Pos	Team	Pld	W	D	L	GF	GA	GD	Pts	Qualification
1	Costa Rica	3	2	1	0	5	3	+2	7	Knockout stage
2	Canada	3	2	0	1	9	2	+7	6	
3	Panama	3	1	1	1	5	11	−6	4	
4	Dominican Republic	3	0	0	3	2	5	−3	0	

Source: CONCACAF
Rules for classification: Tiebreakers
7 August 2018
11:00

Canada	1–2	Costa Rica

Field 1, IMG Academy
7 August 2018
11:00

Panama	3–2	Dominican Republic

Field 3, IMG Academy

8 August 2018
11:00

Costa Rica	2–2	Panama

Field 1, IMG Academy
8 August 2018
11:00

Dominican Republic	0–1	Canada

Field 3, IMG Academy

10 August 2018
11:00

Panama	0–7	Canada

Field 1, IMG Academy
10 August 2018
11:00

Dominican Republic	0–1	Costa Rica

Field 3, IMG Academy

=== Group C ===
Pos	Team	Pld	W	D	L	GF	GA	GD	Pts	Qualification
1	Mexico	3	3	0	0	7	0	+7	9	Knockout stage
2	Haiti	3	2	0	1	10	3	+7	6	
3	Northern Ireland	3	1	0	2	2	9	−7	3	
4	Puerto Rico	3	0	0	3	3	10	−7	0	

Source: CONCACAF
Rules for classification: Tiebreakers
7 August 2018
9:00

Mexico	1–0	Haiti

Field 7, IMG Academy
7 August 2018
9:00

Puerto Rico	1–2	Northern Ireland

Field 11, IMG Academy

8 August 2018
9:00

Northern Ireland	0–3	Mexico

Field 7, IMG Academy
8 August 2018
9:00

Haiti	5–2	Puerto Rico

Field 11, IMG Academy

10 August 2018
9:00

Puerto Rico	0–3	Mexico

Field 7, IMG Academy
10 August 2018
9:00

Northern Ireland	0–5	Haiti

Field 11, IMG Academy

=== Group D ===
Pos	Team	Pld	W	D	L	GF	GA	GD	Pts	Qualification
1	Bermuda	3	3	0	0	6	2	+4	9	Knockout stage
2	Barbados	3	1	1	1	3	1	+2	4	
3	Curaçao	3	1	1	1	4	4	0	4	
4	Antigua and Barbuda	3	0	0	3	3	9	−6	0	

Source: CONCACAF
Rules for classification: Tiebreakers
6 August 2018
9:00

Antigua and Barbuda	1–3	Bermuda

Field 1, IMG Academy
6 August 2018
9:00

Barbados	0–0	Curaçao

Field 3, IMG Academy

7 August 2018
11:00

Bermuda	1–0	Barbados

Field 7, IMG Academy
7 August 2018
11:00

Curaçao	3–2	Antigua and Barbuda

Field 11, IMG Academy

9 August 2018
9:00

Barbados	3–0	Antigua and Barbuda

Field 1, IMG Academy
9 August 2018
9:00

Curaçao	1–2	Bermuda

Field 3, IMG Academy

=== Group E ===
Pos	Team	Pld	W	D	L	GF	GA	GD	Pts	Qualification
1	Saint Lucia	3	3	0	0	9	1	+8	9	Knockout stage
2	Cayman Islands	3	2	0	1	6	5	+1	6	
3	Guyana	3	1	0	2	4	7	−3	3	
4	Bahamas	3	0	0	3	3	9	−6	0	

Source: CONCACAF
Rules for classification: Tiebreakers
6 August 2018
11:00

Bahamas	1–4	Cayman Islands

Field 1, IMG Academy
6 August 2018
11:00

Guyana	1–3	Saint Lucia

Field 3, IMG Academy

7 August 2018
9:00

Cayman Islands	2–0	Guyana

Field 5, IMG Academy
7 August 2018
9:00

Saint Lucia	2–0	Bahamas

Field 9, IMG Academy

9 August 2018
11:00

Guyana	3–2	Bahamas

Field 1, IMG Academy
9 August 2018
11:00

Saint Lucia	4–0	Cayman Islands

Field 3, IMG Academy

=== Group F ===
Pos	Team	Pld	W	D	L	GF	GA	GD	Pts	Qualification
1	Martinique	3	3	0	0	8	1	+7	9	Knockout stage
2	Saint Kitts and Nevis	3	2	0	1	10	5	+5	6	
3	Belize	3	1	0	2	7	7	0	3	
4	U.S. Virgin Islands	3	0	0	3	0	12	−12	0	

Source: CONCACAF
Rules for classification: Tiebreakers
6 August 2018
9:00

Belize	3–4	Saint Kitts and Nevis

Field 7, IMG Academy
6 August 2018
9:00

U.S. Virgin Islands	0–3	Martinique

Field 11, IMG Academy

7 August 2018
11:00

Saint Kitts and Nevis	5–0	U.S. Virgin Islands

Field 5, IMG Academy
7 August 2018
11:00

Martinique	3–0	Belize

Field 9, IMG Academy

9 August 2018
11:00

U.S. Virgin Islands	0–4	Belize

Field 7, IMG Academy
9 August 2018
11:00

Martinique	2–1	Saint Kitts and Nevis

Field 11, IMG Academy

=== Group G ===
Pos	Team	Pld	W	D	L	GF	GA	GD	Pts	Qualification
1	Grenada	3	3	0	0	10	2	+8	9	Knockout stage
2	Anguilla	3	2	0	1	8	4	+4	6	
3	Dominica	3	1	0	2	5	7	−2	3	
4	Saint Vincent and the Grenadines	3	0	0	3	2	12	−10	0	

Source: CONCACAF
Rules for classification: Tiebreakers
6 August 2018
11:00

Grenada	2–1	Dominica

Field 7, IMG Academy
6 August 2018
11:00

Anguilla	3–1	Saint Vincent and the Grenadines

Field 11, IMG Academy

7 August 2018
9:00

Dominica	0–4	Anguilla

Field 13, IMG Academy
7 August 2018
11:00

Saint Vincent and the Grenadines	0–5	Grenada

Field 13, IMG Academy

9 August 2018
9:00

Anguilla	1–3	Grenada

Field 7, IMG Academy
9 August 2018
9:00

Saint Vincent and the Grenadines	1–4	Dominica

Field 11, IMG Academy

== Knockout Stage ==
=== Division One ===
Semi-finals
Portugal	0
United States	3
Mexico	2
Costa Rica	0

Final
United States	3
Mexico	0

=== Semi-finals ===
August 11, 2022
9:00

Portugal	0—3	United States

Field 1, IMG Academy
August 11, 2022
9:00

Mexico	2—0	Costa Rica

Field 7, IMG Academy

=== Final ===
August 13, 2022
11:00

United States	3—0	Mexico

Field 1, IMG Academy

=== Placements ===
August 11, 2022
9:00

Haiti	0—2	Canada

Field 3, IMG Academy
August 11, 2022
11:00

Panama	0—1	Northern Ireland

Field 1, IMG Academy
August 11, 2022
11:00

Puerto Rico	1—0	Jamaica

Field 3, IMG Academy
August 11, 2022
11:00

El Salvador	1—2	Dominican Republic

Field 7, IMG Academy

=== Division Two ===
Semi-finals
Martinique	1(6)
Grenada	1(7)
Bermuda	1
Saint Lucia	0

Final
Bermuda	2
Grenada	1

=== Semi-finals ===
August 10, 2022
11:00

Martinique	1—1	Grenada
Penalties
	6—7

Field 11, IMG Academy
August 10, 2022
11:00

Bermuda	1—0	Saint Lucia

Field 7, IMG Academy

=== Final ===
August 12, 2022
11:00

Bermuda	2—1	Grenada

Field 1, IMG Academy

=== Placements ===
August 10, 2022
9:00

Barbados	1—0	Cayman Islands

Field 5, IMG Academy
August 10, 2022
9:00

Saint Kitts and Nevis	3—1	Anguilla

Field 9, IMG Academy
August 10, 2022
11:00

Belize	2—1	Dominica

Field 5, IMG Academy
August 10, 2022
11:00

Curaçao	0—6	Guyana

Field 9, IMG Academy
August 10, 2022
9:00

Antigua and Barbuda	1—4	Bahamas

Field 13, IMG Academy
August 10, 2022
11:00

U.S. Virgin Islands	0—2	Saint Vincent and the Grenadines

Field 13, IMG Academy
