= 2025 NCAA Division I women's soccer season =

American college soccer season

- Number of teams: 350
- Preseason No. 1: North Carolina

Statistics
- Biggest home win: 13 goals: Indiana State vs. St. Mary-of-the-Woods 13–0
- Biggest away win: 11 goals: Bellarmine vs. Asbury 11–0
- Highest scoring: 13 goals: Indiana State vs. St. Mary-of-the-Woods 13–0
- Longest winning run: 13 games, Dayton (September 12, 2025 – November 9, 2025)
- Longest unbeaten run: 20 games, Florida State (October 12, 2024 – October 9, 2025); Memphis (August 14, 2025 – November 21, 2025)
- Longest winless run: 31 games, UC Riverside (September 12, 2024 – present)
- Longest losing run: 13 games, Nicholls (September 22, 2024 – August 31, 2025)

Tournament
- Duration: November 14 – December 8, 2024
- Most conference bids: ACC, Big Ten, SEC – 9 bids

College Cup
- Date: December 8, 2025
- Site: CPKC Stadium; Kansas City, Missouri
- Champions: Florida State
- Runners-up: Stanford

Seasons
- ← 2024 2026 →

The 2025 NCAA Division I women's soccer season was the 44th season of NCAA championship women's college soccer.

The season began on August 14, 2025, and finished on December 8, 2025, with the 2025 NCAA Division I women's soccer tournament and the College Cup being held at CPKC Stadium in Kansas City, Missouri.

North Carolina were the defending NCAA champions. The Tar Heels were unable to defend their title, losing in the Round of 16 in the NCAA Tournament. Florida State finished as champions, defeating Stanford 1–0 in the NCAA Tournament Final.

== Changes from 2024 ==
=== Coaching changes ===
There were 51 coaching changes during the 2024–25 offseason.

Program	Outgoing coach	Manner of departure	Date of vacancy	Incoming coach	Date of appointment	References
Akron	Jen Simonetti	Fired	May 13, 2025	Maggie Kuhn	May 13, 2025	
Alabama State	Jodie Smith	Retired	January 29, 2025	Alicia Wilson	March 24, 2025	
Arkansas–Pine Bluff	Jayme Selph	Unknown	August 7, 2025	Emanuel Stephens	August 7, 2025	
Auburn	Karen Hoppa	Retired	November 26, 2024	James Armstrong	December 3, 2024	
Ball State	Josh Rife	Accepted Head Coaching job with Indiana	February 11, 2025	Andy Stoots	March 11, 2025	
Bellarmine	Callie McKinney	Accepted Assistant Coach job with SMU	July 15, 2025	Steve Bornhoffer	July 22, 2025	
Boston University	Casey Brown	Stepped down	December 13, 2024	Megan Burke	January 30, 2025	
Cal Poly	Alex Crozier	Retired	November 2, 2024	Bernardo Silva	December 21, 2024	
Cal State Bakersfield	Bernardo Silva	Accepted Head Coaching job with Cal Poly	December 21, 2024	Whitney Pitalo	February 19, 2025	
Central Arkansas	Jeremy Bishop	Assistant Athletic Director for Media Relations	July 28, 2025	Derek Nichols	July 28, 2025	
Charlotte	Brandi Fontaine	Fired	February 28, 2025	Sinead Byrne	April 18, 2025	
Chicago State	Josh Reyes	Accepted Scouting job with Austin FC	November 20, 2024	Kevin Larry	January 27, 2025	
East Carolina	Gary Higgins	Accepted Head Coaching job with NC State	December 12, 2024	Emily Buccilla	December 17, 2024	
Duke	Robbie Church	Retired	December 6, 2024	Kieran Hall	January 7, 2025	
Duquesne	Dave Gray	End of interim period	October 27, 2024	Jessica Giegucz	December 20, 2024	
Florida International	Jonathan Garbar	Accepted Assistant Coach job with Mississippi State	January 23, 2025	Mat Dunn	March 20, 2025	
Green Bay	Julie Grutzner	Fired	November 4, 2024	Matt Kagan	November 29, 2024	
Houston	Jamie Frias	Accepted Assistant Coaching job with Houston Dash	January 23, 2025	Ben Williams	February 12, 2025	
Illinois	Janet Rayfield	Retired	October 30, 2024	Katie Hultin	December 10, 2024	
Indiana	Erwin Van Bennekom	Resigned	January 13, 2025	Josh Rife	February 11, 2025	
IU Indy	Chris Johnson	Retired	November 7, 2024	Angela Berry-White	December 9, 2024	
Jacksonville State	Sean Fraser	Unknown		Corey Smith	May 3, 2025	
Kansas State	Mike Dibbini	Resigned	October 28, 2024	Colleen Corbin	December 2, 2024	
LIU	Tom Giovatto	Accepted Head Coaching job with Manhattan (men)	July 10, 2025	Jim O'Brien	August 6, 2025	
Loyola-Chicago	Angela Staveskie	End of interim period	November 2, 2024	Jon Sandoval	December 20, 2024	
Maryland	Meg Nemzer	Fired	October 10, 2024	Michael Marchiano	December 11, 2024	
McNeese	Drew Fitzgerald	Resigned	June 17, 2025	Juan Yepes	June 17, 2025	
Mercyhurst	Rich Wall	Accepted Head Coaching job with Youngstown State	January 2, 2025	Dale White	February 14, 2025	
Mississippi State	James Armstrong	Accepted Head Coaching job with Auburn	December 3, 2024	Nick Zimmerman	December 3, 2024	
Mount St. Mary's	Melissa Sherwood	Accepted Head Coaching job with St. Bonaventure	January 29, 2025	Liis Abbott	February 17, 2025	
NC State	Tim Santoro	Fired	November 8, 2024	Gary Higgins	December 12, 2024	
Niagara	Eric Dade	End of interim period	October 30, 2024	Donny George	December 4, 2024	
North Dakota	Chris Logan	Contract not renewed	November 25, 2024	Henrik Sohn	January 3, 2025	
Northern Iowa	Bruce Erickson	Accepted Head Coaching job with Iowa Western Community College	May 1, 2025	Alex Place Thomas	June 20, 2025	
Oregon	Graeme Abel	Resigned	October 29, 2024	Tracy Joyner	December 2, 2024	
Pacific	Danesha Adams	Parted ways	November 12, 2024	Jeff Freeman	December 27, 2024	
Pacific	JJ Wozniak	Parted ways	November 12, 2024	Jeff Freeman	December 27, 2024	
Pittsburgh	Randy Waldrum	Elevated to Technical Director	May 22, 2025	Ben Waldrum	May 22, 2025	
Sam Houston	Sonia Curvelo	Accepted Head Coachin job with San Jose State	March 26, 2025	Kendall Ayers	April 28, 2025	
San Jose State	Tina Estrada	Resigned	February 27, 2025	Sonia Curvelo	March 26, 2025	
St. Bonaventure	Donny George	Accepted Head Coaching job with Niagara	December 4, 2024	Melissa Sherwood	January 29, 2025	
Stephen F. Austin	Ben Williams	Accepted Head Coaching job with Houston	February 12, 2025	Ashley Whittemore	March 27, 2025	
South Carolina State	Liz-Amanda Brown	Accepted Assistant Coaching job with USC Upstate	January 17, 2025	Andrew Richardson	May 6, 2025	
Southeast Missouri State	Heather Nelson	Retired	December 6, 2024	John Klein	January 21, 2025	
Texas Southern	Kendall Ayers	Accepted Head Coaching job with Sam Houston	April 23, 2025	Danesha Adams	June 27, 2025	
UC Davis	Tracy Joyner	Accepted Head Coaching job with Oregon	December 2, 2024	Kat Mertz	January 22, 2025	
UC Riverside	Gerardo Hidalgo	End of interim period	January 30, 2025	Mike Dibbini	January 30, 2025	
VCU	Lindsey Martin	Mutually parted ways	November 7, 2024	Lauryn Hutchinson	February 12, 2025	
VMI	Chris Haught-Thompson	Stepped down	November 8, 2024	Jim Robbins	February 4, 2025	
Weber State	Craig Sanders	Retired	November 20, 2024	Kyle Christensen	December 6, 2024	
Western Illinois	Josee Primeau	Fired	October 31, 2024	Ross Henderson	January 31, 2025	
Wofford	Elissa Post	Accepted Assistant Coaching job with Kansas State	January 22, 2025	Kevin Dempsey	January 23, 2025	
Youngstown State	Brian Shrum	Retired	November 8, 2024	Rich Wall	January 2, 2025	

=== Conference realignment ===
Team	Conference in 2024	Conference in 2025
Delaware	CAA	CUSA
Grand Canyon	WAC	Mountain West
Missouri State	MVC	CUSA
New Haven	NE-10 (D-II)	NEC
Seattle	WAC	WCC
UMass	Atlantic 10	MAC

=== Transition to Division I Completed ===
Six schools completed the transition to Division I, a year earlier than originally anticipated, and will be eligible for post-season play at the end of the 2025 season.

Team	Conference
East Texas A&M	Southland
Lindenwood	OVC
Queens	ASUN
Southern Indiana	OVC
St. Thomas	Summit League
Stonehill	NEC

=== Other headlines ===
- March 25 – Saint Francis announced that its athletic programs would leave the Northeast Conference to move to Division III at the conclusion of the 2025–26 academic year, and join the Presidents' Athletic Conference (PAC).
- June 4 – Utah Valley announced it would join the Big West Conference from the Western Athletic Conference (WAC) in 2026–27.
- June 18 – Sacramento State announced it would join the Big West Conference from the Big Sky Conference in 2026–27.
- June 25 – Southern Utah and Utah Tech announced they would join the Big Sky Conference from the WAC in 2026–27.
- June 26 – The Atlantic Sun Conference (ASUN) and the Western Athletic Conference (WAC) announced a strategic alliance under which the WAC will rebrand as the United Athletic Conference (UAC) beginning in 2026. Under the reorganization, the rebranded conference's full membership will include ASUN and WAC institutions that sponsor scholarship football, along with non-football UT Arlington, while ASUN institutions that do not sponsor football or do not offer football scholarships will continue to compete under the ASUN name.
- June 30 – Texas State announced it would join the Pac-12 Conference from the Sun Belt Conference in 2026–27.
- July 15 - Louisiana Tech announced it would replace Texas State in the Sun Belt Conference from Conference USA. Tech will join the Sun Belt no later than July 1, 2027.
- July 21 – The American Athletic Conference announced a name change to the American Conference as part of a comprehensive rebranding strategy. The conference no longer uses an initialism, opting for "American" as its short form.
- August 13 – Tennessee Tech announced it would join the Southern Conference from the Ohio Valley Conference in 2026–27.
- September 3 – UC San Diego announced it would join the West Coast Conference (WCC) from the Big West Conference in 2027–28.
- October 2 – The Northeast Conference adopted its longstanding abbreviation of NEC as its official name.
- October 10 – Little Rock announced it would leave the OVC for the UAC in 2026–27.
- October 31 – The WCC announced that Denver would join from the Summit League in 2026–27.

== Rankings ==
=== Preseason polls ===
United Soccer Coaches
Rank	Team
1	North Carolina
2	Notre Dame
3	Florida State
4	Duke
5	USC
6	Arkansas
7	Stanford
8	UCLA
9	TCU
10	Wake Forest
11	Penn State
12	Michigan State
13	Iowa
14	Virginia Tech
15	Virginia
16	Santa Clara
17	Vanderbilt
18	Ohio State
19	Texas
20	Mississippi State
21	South Carolina
22	Oklahoma State
23	Wisconsin
24	Minnesota
25	Texas Tech

Top Drawer Soccer
Rank	Team
1	North Carolina
2	Stanford
3	Notre Dame
4	Florida State
5	Duke
6	Penn State
7	Arkansas
8	UCLA
9	Ohio State
10	Virginia Tech
11	Michigan State
12	Vanderbilt
13	Wisconsin
14	Minnesota
15	South Carolina
16	TCU
17	Iowa
18	Wake Forest
19	Texas Tech
20	Texas
21	USC
22	Mississippi State
23	Georgetown
24	Connecticut
25	Kansas

== Regular season ==
=== Major upsets ===
In this list, a "major upset" is defined as a game won by a team ranked 10 or more spots lower or an unranked team that defeats a team ranked No. 15 or higher.

All rankings are from the United Soccer Coaches Poll. Home team is shown in italics.

Date	Winner	Score	Loser
August 14	Tennessee	2–0	No. 1 North Carolina
August 21	Georgia	2–0	No. 12 North Carolina
August 23	No. 19 BYU	1–0	No. 4 UCLA
August 24	Georgetown	2–1	No. 15 Virginia Tech
August 24	No. 20 Mississippi State	2–1	No. 10 Wake Forest
September 4	Northwestern	1–0	No. 4 TCU
September 4	Wyoming	1–0	No. 15 Georgia
September 7	No. 18 UCLA	2–0	No. 1 Stanford
September 11	Washington	1–0	No. 15 USC
September 12	Mississippi State	3–2	No. 1 Tennessee
September 18	Arizona State	2–1	No. 10 BYU
September 21	Wisconsin	2–1	No. 8 Penn State
September 25	Baylor	3–0	No. 14 Kansas
September 25	No. 19 Wake Forest	3–2	No. 9 Duke
September 25	No. 20 Wisconsin	2–1	No. 8 Iowa
September 26	Texas	2–1	No. 13 Vanderbilt
October 2	Colorado	3–1	No. 7т TCU
October 2	NC State	2–1	No. 12 Wake Forest
October 4	Washington	1–0	No. 4 UCLA
October 9	Wisconsin	1–0	No. 9 UCLA
October 10	Florida	2–1	No. 12 Mississippi State
October 10	Georgia	1–0	No. 6 Arkansas
October 16	Kentucky	3–2	No. 8 South Carolina
October 16	UCLA	3–0	No. 5 Iowa
October 19	No. 21т Vanderbilt	2–0	No. 4 Tennessee
October 23	No. 22 Colorado	3–0	No. 5 Texas Tech
October 26	Oregon	2–1	No. 8 Washington
October 30	Pittsburgh	1–0	No. 1 Notre Dame
November 1	No. 24 Wisconsin	3–0	No. 13 Iowa
November 4	LSU	2–0†	No. 14 Tennessee
November 4	Mississippi State	2–1†	No. 4 Arkansas
November 5	Kansas	2–1†	No. 12 Colorado
November 9	No. 22 Xavier	2–0†	No. 10 Georgetown
November 14	North Carolina	3–1	No. 14 Tennessee
November 20	Ohio State	1–0 (2OT)	No. 2 Notre Dame

† denotes game was played on neutral site

=== Conference standings ===
2025 American Conference women's soccer standings
	Conf.						Overall
Team	W		L		T	PCT	W		L		T	PCT
No. 18 Memphis ‍†‍‍^{y}	9	–	0	–	1	.950	17	–	1	–	3	.881
Charlotte ‍‍‍	6	–	2	–	2	.700	10	–	6	–	2	.611
Tulsa ‍‍‍	4	–	3	–	3	.550	9	–	6	–	5	.575
UAB ‍‍‍	4	–	3	–	3	.550	7	–	6	–	6	.526
UTSA ‍‍‡‍^{y}	4	–	3	–	3	.550	10	–	6	–	6	.591
Rice ‍‍‍	3	–	2	–	5	.550	10	–	4	–	6	.650
South Florida ‍‍‍	4	–	4	–	2	.500	9	–	8	–	3	.525
East Carolina ‍‍‍	4	–	4	–	2	.500	6	–	8	–	4	.444
North Texas ‍‍‍	2	–	5	–	3	.350	6	–	10	–	4	.400
Florida Atlantic ‍‍‍	1	–	7	–	2	.200	4	–	12	–	3	.289
Temple ‍‍‍	1	–	9	–	0	.100	4	–	15	–	0	.211
† – Conference champion ‡ – 2025 American Tournament champion y – Invited to the NCAA Tournament; As of December 9, 2025; Rankings from United Soccer Coaches Poll; Source:American Conference

2025 America East Conference women's soccer standings
	Conf.						Overall
Team	W		L		T	PCT	W		L		T	PCT
Binghamton ‍†‍‍	5	–	0	–	3	.813	10	–	2	–	5	.735
Vermont ‍‍‍	5	–	1	–	2	.750	8	–	4	–	6	.611
UMass Lowell ‍‍‍	3	–	2	–	3	.563	6	–	5	–	6	.529
Maine ‍‍‡‍^{y}	3	–	3	–	2	.500	6	–	8	–	4	.444
Bryant ‍‍‍	2	–	2	–	4	.500	5	–	5	–	8	.500
New Hampshire ‍‍‍	2	–	2	–	4	.500	4	–	6	–	7	.441
NJIT ‍‍‍	2	–	3	–	3	.438	7	–	5	–	6	.556
UMBC ‍‍‍	2	–	5	–	1	.313	6	–	8	–	4	.444
Albany ‍‍‍	1	–	7	–	0	.125	2	–	13	–	2	.176
† – Conference champion ‡ – 2025 America East Tournament champion y – Invited to the NCAA Tournament; As of December 9, 2025; Rankings from United Soccer Coaches Poll; Source:America East Conference

2025 Atlantic 10 Conference women's soccer standings
	Conf.						Overall
Team	W		L		T	PCT	W		L		T	PCT
Dayton ‍†‍‡‍^{y}	10	–	0	–	0	1.000	15	–	4	–	3	.750
Saint Louis ‍‍‍	8	–	1	–	1	.850	14	–	4	–	2	.750
Duquesne ‍‍‍	7	–	3	–	0	.700	12	–	5	–	2	.684
Rhode Island ‍‍‍	5	–	3	–	2	.600	13	–	5	–	3	.690
Loyola-Chicago ‍‍‍	4	–	2	–	4	.600	9	–	4	–	6	.632
Fordham ‍‍‍	5	–	4	–	1	.550	10	–	7	–	3	.575
VCU ‍‍‍	5	–	4	–	1	.550	7	–	10	–	3	.425
LaSalle ‍‍‍	4	–	4	–	2	.500	7	–	8	–	3	.472
Davidson ‍‍‍	3	–	5	–	2	.400	7	–	7	–	3	.500
George Mason ‍‍‍	3	–	5	–	2	.400	4	–	10	–	4	.333
Saint Joseph's ‍‍‍	2	–	6	–	2	.300	5	–	10	–	3	.361
Richmond ‍‍‍	1	–	5	–	4	.300	4	–	7	–	7	.417
George Washington ‍‍‍	2	–	7	–	1	.250	5	–	9	–	4	.389
St. Bonaventure ‍‍‍	0	–	10	–	0	.000	3	–	13	–	2	.222
† – Conference champion ‡ – 2025 Atlantic 10 Tournament champion y – Invited to the NCAA Tournament; As of December 9, 2025; Rankings from United Soccer Coaches Poll; Source:A10 Conference

2025 ASUN Conference women's soccer standings
	Conf.						Overall
Team	W		L		T	PCT	W		L		T	PCT
Gold
Lipscomb ‍†‍‡‍^{y}	7	–	2	–	1	.750	15	–	6	–	2	.696
Eastern Kentucky ‍‍‍	5	–	2	–	3	.650	10	–	4	–	5	.658
North Alabama ‍‍‍	4	–	3	–	3	.550	8	–	5	–	6	.579
Bellarmine ‍‍‍	4	–	5	–	1	.450	11	–	6	–	3	.625
Central Arkansas ‍‍‍	3	–	5	–	2	.400	6	–	9	–	2	.412
Austin Peay ‍‍‍	0	–	6	–	4	.200	0	–	11	–	7	.194
Graphite
Florida Gulf Coast ‍†‍‍	8	–	1	–	1	.850	11	–	5	–	2	.667
Jacksonville ‍‍‍	6	–	1	–	3	.750	9	–	5	–	5	.605
North Florida ‍‍‍	5	–	3	–	2	.600	9	–	9	–	4	.500
Queens ‍‍‍	2	–	6	–	2	.300	3	–	11	–	5	.289
West Georgia ^{#} ‍‍‍	2	–	6	–	2	.300	4	–	13	–	2	.263
Stetson ‍‍‍	2	–	8	–	0	.200	5	–	14	–	0	.263
† – Conference champion ‡ – 2025 ASUN Tournament champion y – Invited to the NCAA Tournament^{#} – Ineligible for post-season (In transition); As of December 9, 2025; Rankings from United Soccer Coaches Poll; Source:Atlantic Sun Conference

2025 ACC women's soccer standings
	Conf.						Overall
Team	W		L		T	PCT	W		L		T	PCT
No. 2 Stanford ‍†‍‡‍^{y}	9	–	0	–	1	.950	21	–	2	–	2	.880
No. 11 Notre Dame ‍‍‍^{y}	8	–	1	–	1	.850	15	–	2	–	3	.825
No. 3 Duke ‍‍‍^{y}	7	–	3	–	0	.700	17	–	5	–	1	.761
No. 1 Florida State ‍‍‍^{y}	6	–	2	–	2	.700	16	–	2	–	4	.818
No. 8 Virginia ‍‍‍^{y}	6	–	2	–	2	.700	14	–	3	–	5	.750
No. 24 Louisville ‍‍‍^{y}	6	–	2	–	2	.700	13	–	5	–	3	.690
No. 13т North Carolina ‍‍‍^{y}	6	–	4	–	0	.600	13	–	6	–	2	.667
California ‍‍‍	4	–	2	–	4	.600	8	–	3	–	8	.632
Wake Forest ‍‍‍^{y}	4	–	3	–	3	.550	11	–	5	–	4	.650
NC State ‍‍‍	4	–	4	–	2	.500	5	–	9	–	4	.389
Clemson ‍‍‍^{y}	4	–	4	–	2	.500	8	–	6	–	5	.553
SMU ‍‍‍	2	–	6	–	2	.300	8	–	8	–	2	.500
Pittsburgh ‍‍‍	2	–	8	–	0	.200	6	–	10	–	2	.389
Miami (FL) ‍‍‍	1	–	7	–	2	.200	7	–	8	–	3	.472
Boston College ‍‍‍	1	–	7	–	2	.200	5	–	8	–	5	.417
Syracuse ‍‍‍	1	–	8	–	1	.150	5	–	9	–	4	.389
Virginia Tech ‍‍‍	0	–	8	–	2	.100	4	–	10	–	4	.333
† – Conference champion ‡ – 2025 ACC Tournament champion y – Invited to the NCAA Tournament; As of December 9, 2025; Rankings from United Soccer Coaches Poll; Source: The ACC

2025 Big East Conference women's soccer standings
	Conf.						Overall
Team	W		L		T	PCT	W		L		T	PCT
No. 9т Georgetown ‍†‍‍^{y}	10	–	0	–	0	1.000	16	–	4	–	3	.761
No. 25 Xavier ‍‍‡‍^{y}	8	–	1	–	1	.850	16	–	4	–	2	.773
Connecticut ‍‍‍	7	–	1	–	2	.800	11	–	4	–	3	.694
Creighton ‍‍‍	4	–	3	–	3	.550	7	–	8	–	4	.474
Villanova ‍‍‍	4	–	5	–	1	.450	9	–	8	–	1	.528
Providence ‍‍‍	3	–	4	–	3	.450	6	–	6	–	4	.500
Marquette ‍‍‍	3	–	4	–	3	.450	7	–	7	–	4	.500
Butler ‍‍‍	2	–	3	–	5	.450	5	–	4	–	8	.529
St. John's ‍‍‍	1	–	6	–	3	.250	3	–	9	–	5	.324
DePaul ‍‍‍	1	–	7	–	2	.200	4	–	12	–	2	.278
Seton Hall ‍‍‍	0	–	9	–	1	.050	3	–	10	–	5	.306
† – Conference champion ‡ – 2025 Big East Tournament champion y – Invited to the NCAA Tournament; As of December 9, 2025; Rankings from United Soccer Coaches Poll; Source:The Big East Conference

2025 Big Sky Conference women's soccer standings
	Conf.						Overall
Team	W		L		T	PCT	W		L		T	PCT
Montana ‍†‍‡‍^{y}	5	–	1	–	2	.750	11	–	4	–	5	.675
Weber St. ‍‍‍	5	–	2	–	1	.688	12	–	6	–	2	.650
Eastern Washington ‍‍‍	4	–	3	–	1	.563	8	–	7	–	4	.526
Portland St. ‍‍‍	3	–	3	–	2	.500	4	–	9	–	4	.353
Idaho ‍‍‍	2	–	2	–	4	.500	6	–	5	–	9	.525
Northern Arizona ‍‍‍	2	–	3	–	3	.438	6	–	6	–	7	.500
Idaho St. ‍‍‍	2	–	4	–	2	.375	5	–	8	–	4	.412
Northern Colorado ‍‍‍	2	–	4	–	2	.375	3	–	10	–	6	.316
Sacramento St. ‍‍‍	2	–	5	–	1	.313	6	–	11	–	1	.361
† – Conference champion ‡ – 2025 Big Sky Tournament champion y – Invited to the NCAA Tournament; As of December 9, 2025; Rankings from United Soccer Coaches Poll; Source:The Big Sky Conference

2025 Big South Conference women's soccer standings
	Conf.						Overall
Team	W		L		T	PCT	W		L		T	PCT
Radford ‍†‍‍	7	–	1	–	0	.875	10	–	5	–	1	.656
USC Upstate ‍‍‍	6	–	2	–	0	.750	10	–	6	–	3	.605
Longwood ‍‍‍	5	–	3	–	0	.625	9	–	7	–	3	.553
High Point ‍‍‡‍^{y}	3	–	3	–	2	.500	5	–	10	–	5	.375
Gardner-Webb ‍‍‍	3	–	3	–	2	.500	4	–	11	–	3	.306
Charleston Southern ‍‍‍	3	–	4	–	1	.438	6	–	8	–	4	.444
Winthrop ‍‍‍	2	–	3	–	3	.438	4	–	6	–	6	.438
UNC Asheville ‍‍‍	1	–	5	–	2	.250	5	–	9	–	3	.382
Presbyterian ‍‍‍	0	–	6	–	2	.125	3	–	10	–	3	.281
† – Conference champion ‡ – 2025 Big South Tournament champion y – Invited to the NCAA Tournament; As of December 9, 2025; Rankings from United Soccer Coaches Poll; Source:Big South Conference

2025 Big Ten Conference women's soccer standings
	Conf.						Overall
Team	W		L		T	PCT	W		L		T	PCT
No. 6 Washington ‍†‍‡‍^{y}	8	–	1	–	2	.818	15	–	3	–	7	.740
No. 7 Michigan St ‍‍‍^{y}	7	–	1	–	3	.773	15	–	4	–	6	.720
No. 21 Iowa ‍‍‍^{y}	6	–	2	–	3	.682	12	–	5	–	4	.667
No. 22 UCLA ‍‍‍^{y}	6	–	2	–	3	.682	12	–	5	–	4	.667
No. 23 Wisconsin ‍‍‍^{y}	6	–	3	–	2	.636	14	–	6	–	2	.682
Illinois ‍‍‍^{y}	5	–	4	–	2	.545	13	–	6	–	2	.667
Penn St ‍‍‍^{y}	5	–	4	–	2	.545	10	–	8	–	3	.548
Northwestern ‍‍‍^{y}	4	–	2	–	5	.591	9	–	4	–	8	.619
No. 9т Ohio St ‍‍‍^{y}	4	–	2	–	5	.591	11	–	5	–	6	.636
USC ‍‍‍	4	–	5	–	2	.455	7	–	7	–	3	.500
Michigan ‍‍‍	3	–	4	–	4	.455	6	–	8	–	4	.444
Nebraska ‍‍‍	3	–	5	–	3	.409	8	–	5	–	5	.583
Indiana ‍‍‍	2	–	4	–	5	.409	5	–	6	–	6	.471
Purdue ‍‍‍	3	–	7	–	1	.318	6	–	10	–	3	.395
Minnesota ‍‍‍	2	–	6	–	3	.318	6	–	8	–	3	.441
Rutgers ‍‍‍	2	–	7	–	2	.273	4	–	7	–	5	.406
Maryland ‍‍‍	2	–	8	–	1	.227	6	–	11	–	1	.361
Oregon ‍‍‍	1	–	6	–	4	.273	3	–	10	–	5	.306
† – Conference champion ‡ – 2025 Big Ten Tournament champion y – Invited to the NCAA Tournament; As of December 9, 2025; Rankings from United Soccer Coaches Poll; Source:Big Ten

2025 Big West Conference women's soccer standings
	Conf.						Overall
Team	W		L		T	PCT	W		L		T	PCT
Cal State Northridge ‍†‍‍	6	–	1	–	3	.750	8	–	7	–	5	.525
Cal Poly ‍‍‡‍^{y}	6	–	2	–	2	.700	10	–	3	–	9	.659
Cal State Fullerton ‍‍‍	6	–	2	–	2	.700	14	–	3	–	3	.775
UC Irvine ‍‍‍	5	–	2	–	3	.650	8	–	5	–	7	.575
UC Santa Barbara ‍‍‍	5	–	2	–	3	.650	13	–	5	–	5	.674
Cal State Bakersfield ‍‍‍	5	–	4	–	1	.550	8	–	9	–	2	.474
UC San Diego ‍‍‍	3	–	3	–	4	.500	5	–	6	–	8	.474
Long Beach St ‍‍‍	2	–	4	–	4	.400	5	–	8	–	5	.417
Hawaii ‍‍‍	2	–	4	–	4	.400	4	–	8	–	8	.400
UC Davis ‍‍‍	1	–	8	–	1	.150	3	–	12	–	4	.263
UC Riverside ‍‍‍	0	–	9	–	1	.050	0	–	16	–	2	.056
† – Conference champion ‡ – 2025 Big West Tournament champion y – Invited to the NCAA Tournament; As of December 9, 2025; Rankings from United Soccer Coaches Poll; Source:The Big West Conference

2025 Big 12 Conference women's soccer standings
	Conf.						Overall
Team	W		L		T	PCT	W		L		T	PCT
No. 4 TCU ‍†‍‍^{y}	9	–	1	–	1	.864	18	–	3	–	3	.813
No. 19 West Virginia ‍‍‍^{y}	8	–	0	–	3	.864	14	–	3	–	4	.762
No. 12 Colorado ‍‍‍^{y}	8	–	1	–	2	.818	17	–	4	–	3	.771
Texas Tech ‍‍‍^{y}	7	–	1	–	3	.773	14	–	2	–	5	.786
No. 15 Baylor ‍‍‍^{y}	7	–	3	–	1	.682	14	–	5	–	4	.696
UCF ‍‍‍^{y}	5	–	1	–	5	.682	12	–	4	–	5	.690
No. 13т Kansas ‍‍‍^{y}	6	–	4	–	1	.591	16	–	6	–	3	.700
No. 20 BYU ‍‍‡‍^{y}	4	–	5	–	2	.455	11	–	7	–	6	.583
Arizona State ‍‍‍	3	–	5	–	3	.409	10	–	5	–	4	.632
Houston ‍‍‍	2	–	4	–	5	.409	7	–	4	–	7	.583
Cincinnati ‍‍‍	3	–	6	–	2	.364	5	–	8	–	6	.421
Kansas State ‍‍‍	2	–	5	–	4	.364	7	–	6	–	5	.528
Utah ‍‍‍	2	–	7	–	2	.273	7	–	10	–	3	.425
Arizona ‍‍‍	2	–	8	–	1	.227	7	–	11	–	1	.395
Iowa State ‍‍‍	1	–	8	–	2	.182	4	–	9	–	4	.353
Oklahoma State ‍‍‍	0	–	10	–	1	.045	4	–	13	–	2	.263
† – Conference champion ‡ – 2025 Big 12 Tournament champion y – Invited to the NCAA Tournament; As of December 9, 2025; Rankings from United Soccer Coaches Poll; Source: The Big 12 Conference

2025 Coastal Athletic Association women's soccer standings
	Conf.						Overall
Team	W		L		T	PCT	W		L		T	PCT
North
Monmouth ‍†‍‍	5	–	3	–	1	.611	10	–	6	–	2	.611
Stony Brook ‍‍‍	5	–	4	–	0	.556	12	–	6	–	2	.650
Hofstra ‍‍‍	3	–	3	–	3	.500	6	–	5	–	7	.528
Towson ‍‍‍	3	–	3	–	3	.500	5	–	5	–	6	.500
Northeastern ‍‍‍	2	–	4	–	3	.389	3	–	7	–	6	.375
Drexel ‍‍‍	2	–	5	–	2	.333	3	–	7	–	8	.389
South
UNC Wilmington ‍†‍‍	7	–	0	–	2	.889	11	–	3	–	4	.722
William & Mary ‍‍‍	5	–	2	–	2	.667	7	–	7	–	4	.500
Elon ‍‍‡‍^{y}	4	–	2	–	3	.611	11	–	3	–	7	.690
Charleston ‍‍‍	4	–	3	–	2	.556	8	–	6	–	3	.559
Campbell ‍‍‍	2	–	4	–	3	.389	4	–	7	–	5	.406
Hampton ‍‍‍	0	–	9	–	0	.000	5	–	12	–	1	.306
† – Conference champion ‡ – 2025 CAA Tournament champion y – Invited to the NCAA Tournament; As of December 9, 2025; Rankings from United Soccer Coaches Poll; Source: Coastal Athletic Association

2025 Conference USA women's soccer standings
	Conf.						Overall
Team	W		L		T	PCT	W		L		T	PCT
Western Kentucky ‍†‍‍	6	–	0	–	2	.875	9	–	5	–	3	.618
Liberty ‍†‍‡‍^{y}	6	–	0	–	2	.875	14	–	4	–	4	.727
Sam Houston ‍‍‍	5	–	2	–	1	.688	8	–	6	–	3	.559
Middle Tennessee ‍‍‍	5	–	2	–	1	.688	11	–	6	–	3	.625
Florida International ‍‍‍	4	–	3	–	1	.563	7	–	6	–	4	.529
Delaware ‍‍‍	3	–	2	–	3	.563	10	–	2	–	6	.722
Louisiana Tech ‍‍‍	3	–	4	–	1	.438	4	–	13	–	2	.263
Missouri State ‍‍‍	2	–	3	–	3	.438	7	–	9	–	4	.450
New Mexico St ‍‍‍	1	–	3	–	4	.375	2	–	12	–	4	.222
Kennesaw State ‍‍‍	1	–	6	–	1	.188	2	–	11	–	4	.235
UTEP ‍‍‍	0	–	4	–	4	.250	3	–	9	–	5	.324
Jacksonville State ‍‍‍	0	–	7	–	1	.063	6	–	9	–	3	.417
† – Conference champion ‡ – 2025 C-USA Tournament champion y – Invited to the NCAA Tournament; As of December 9, 2025; Rankings from United Soccer Coaches Poll; Source:Conference USA

2025 Horizon League women's soccer standings
	Conf.						Overall
Team	W		L		T	PCT	W		L		T	PCT
Milwaukee ‍†‍‡‍^{y}	8	–	0	–	2	.900	13	–	5	–	3	.690
Northern Kentucky ‍‍‍	7	–	1	–	2	.800	10	–	3	–	6	.684
Youngstown State ‍‍‍	6	–	2	–	2	.700	8	–	10	–	2	.450
Wright State ‍‍‍	4	–	1	–	5	.650	7	–	7	–	5	.500
Green Bay ‍‍‍	4	–	3	–	3	.550	8	–	9	–	4	.476
Oakland ‍‍‍	2	–	2	–	6	.500	4	–	8	–	8	.400
IU Indy ‍‍‍	3	–	5	–	2	.400	4	–	11	–	3	.306
Cleveland State ‍‍‍	1	–	3	–	6	.400	4	–	6	–	7	.441
Robert Morris ‍‍‍	2	–	5	–	3	.350	4	–	9	–	4	.353
Purdue Fort Wayne ‍‍‍	1	–	9	–	0	.100	2	–	15	–	1	.139
Detroit Mercy ‍‍‍	0	–	7	–	3	.150	2	–	13	–	3	.194
† – Conference champion ‡ – 2025 Horizon League Tournament champion y – Invited to the NCAA Tournament; As of December 9, 2025; Rankings from United Soccer Coaches Poll; Source:Horizon League

2025 Ivy League women's soccer standings
	Conf.						Overall
Team	W		L		T	PCT	W		L		T	PCT
Princeton ‍†‍‍	5	–	2	–	0	.714	8	–	6	–	3	.559
Dartmouth ‍‍‡‍^{y}	4	–	1	–	2	.714	12	–	4	–	4	.700
Columbia ‍‍‍	4	–	2	–	1	.643	6	–	7	–	3	.469
Brown ‍‍‍	3	–	2	–	2	.571	9	–	4	–	4	.647
Harvard ‍‍‍	3	–	3	–	1	.500	5	–	6	–	3	.464
Penn ‍‍‍	1	–	3	–	3	.357	5	–	4	–	6	.533
Cornell ‍‍‍	2	–	5	–	0	.286	5	–	7	–	4	.438
Yale ‍‍‍	1	–	5	–	1	.214	3	–	11	–	1	.233
† – Conference champion ‡ – 2025 Ivy League Tournament champion y – Invited to the NCAA Tournament; As of December 9, 2025; Rankings from United Soccer Coaches Poll; Source:Ivy League

2025 Mid-American Conference women's soccer standings
	Conf.						Overall
Team	W		L		T	PCT	W		L		T	PCT
Western Michigan ‍†‍‡‍^{y}	10	–	1	–	1	.875	16	–	4	–	1	.786
Miami (OH) ‍‍‍	8	–	2	–	2	.750	11	–	5	–	3	.658
Buffalo ‍‍‍	8	–	3	–	1	.708	12	–	5	–	2	.684
Ball State ‍‍‍	7	–	4	–	1	.625	10	–	7	–	3	.575
Kent State ‍‍‍	6	–	4	–	2	.583	8	–	6	–	6	.550
Bowling Green ‍‍‍	4	–	1	–	7	.625	10	–	3	–	9	.659
Eastern Michigan ‍‍‍	4	–	4	–	4	.500	6	–	8	–	4	.444
Ohio ‍‍‍	3	–	5	–	4	.417	5	–	9	–	5	.395
Massachusetts ‍‍‍	3	–	6	–	2	.364	5	–	8	–	4	.412
Akron ‍‍‍	2	–	7	–	3	.292	5	–	9	–	4	.389
Northern Illinois ‍‍‍	2	–	7	–	2	.273	4	–	10	–	3	.324
Toledo ‍‍‍	1	–	7	–	4	.250	4	–	8	–	6	.389
Central Michigan ‍‍‍	1	–	8	–	3	.208	1	–	14	–	3	.139
† – Conference champion ‡ – 2025 MAC Tournament champion y – Invited to the NCAA Tournament; As of December 9, 2025; Rankings from United Soccer Coaches Poll; Source:Mid-American Conference

2025 MAAC women's soccer standings
	Conf.						Overall
Team	W		L		T	PCT	W		L		T	PCT
Fairfield ‍†‍‍	10	–	0	–	2	.917	15	–	2	–	2	.842
Quinnipiac ‍‍‍	8	–	0	–	4	.833	8	–	3	–	6	.647
Canisius ‍‍‍	7	–	4	–	1	.625	8	–	8	–	3	.500
Sacred Heart ‍‍‡‍^{y}	7	–	5	–	0	.583	11	–	9	–	2	.545
Siena ‍‍‍	6	–	3	–	3	.625	9	–	5	–	6	.600
Marist ‍‍‍	5	–	2	–	5	.625	6	–	8	–	5	.447
Manhattan ‍‍‍	6	–	5	–	1	.542	7	–	6	–	5	.528
Iona ‍‍‍	4	–	6	–	2	.417	6	–	10	–	3	.395
Niagara ‍‍‍	3	–	7	–	2	.333	6	–	8	–	2	.438
St. Peter's ‍‍‍	3	–	8	–	1	.292	6	–	9	–	3	.417
Merrimack ‍‍‍	3	–	9	–	0	.250	4	–	12	–	2	.278
Rider ‍‍‍	1	–	6	–	5	.292	3	–	8	–	7	.361
Mount St. Mary's ‍‍‍	1	–	9	–	2	.167	3	–	12	–	2	.235
† – Conference champion ‡ – 2025 MAAC Tournament champion y – Invited to the NCAA Tournament; As of December 9, 2025; Rankings from United Soccer Coaches Poll; Source:MAAC

2025 Missouri Valley Conference women's soccer standings
	Conf.						Overall
Team	W		L		T	PCT	W		L		T	PCT
Drake ‍†‍‍	6	–	2	–	1	.722	9	–	6	–	4	.579
Murray State ‍‍‍	5	–	1	–	3	.722	10	–	4	–	5	.658
Indiana State ‍‍‍	4	–	2	–	3	.611	8	–	6	–	6	.550
Illinois State ‍‍‍	4	–	2	–	4	.600	8	–	6	–	8	.545
Southern Illinois ‍‍‍	4	–	5	–	1	.450	10	–	6	–	3	.605
UIC ‍‍‡‍^{y}	3	–	3	–	3	.500	8	–	8	–	6	.500
Evansville ‍‍‍	3	–	5	–	1	.389	7	–	7	–	2	.500
Belmont ‍‍‍	2	–	4	–	3	.389	4	–	6	–	7	.441
Valparaiso ‍‍‍	2	–	4	–	3	.389	5	–	8	–	4	.412
UNI ‍‍‍	1	–	6	–	2	.222	4	–	9	–	3	.344
† – Conference champion ‡ – 2025 Missouri Valley Tournament champion y – Invited to the NCAA Tournament; As of December 9, 2025; Rankings from United Soccer Coaches Poll; Source:Missouri Valley Conference

2025 Mountain West Conference women's soccer standings
	Conf.						Overall
Team	W		L		T	PCT	W		L		T	PCT
Boise St ‍†‍‍	8	–	0	–	2	.900	10	–	3	–	8	.667
Air Force ‍‍‍	6	–	2	–	2	.700	8	–	7	–	4	.526
Utah State ‍‍‡‍^{y}	5	–	2	–	3	.650	10	–	6	–	7	.587
Colorado St ‍‍‍	4	–	2	–	4	.600	10	–	4	–	5	.658
New Mexico ‍‍‍	4	–	2	–	4	.600	9	–	4	–	7	.625
San Diego St ‍‍‍	4	–	2	–	4	.600	8	–	5	–	6	.579
Fresno St ‍‍‍	4	–	4	–	2	.500	7	–	6	–	5	.528
Grand Canyon ‍‍‍	3	–	5	–	2	.400	8	–	8	–	2	.500
Colorado College ‍‍‍	2	–	3	–	5	.450	5	–	6	–	7	.472
Wyoming ‍‍‍	2	–	4	–	4	.400	7	–	6	–	6	.526
UNLV ‍‍‍	2	–	4	–	4	.400	4	–	10	–	5	.342
Nevada ‍‍‍	1	–	8	–	1	.150	2	–	14	–	2	.167
San Jose St ‍‍‍	0	–	7	–	3	.150	1	–	14	–	3	.139
† – Conference champion ‡ – 2025 MW Tournament champion y – Invited to the NCAA Tournament; As of December 9, 2025; Rankings from United Soccer Coaches Poll; Source:Mountain West Conference

2025 Northeast Conference women's soccer standings
	Conf.						Overall
Team	W		L		T	PCT	W		L		T	PCT
FDU ‍†‍‍	9	–	0	–	2	.909	9	–	6	–	5	.575
Wagner ‍‍‡‍^{y}	8	–	1	–	2	.818	11	–	3	–	6	.700
Howard ‍‍‍	7	–	2	–	2	.727	9	–	7	–	3	.553
Central Connecticut ‍‍‍	6	–	1	–	4	.727	7	–	6	–	5	.528
Stonehill ‍‍‍	6	–	3	–	2	.636	6	–	8	–	4	.444
LIU ‍‍‍	5	–	3	–	3	.591	7	–	5	–	5	.559
Delaware State ‍‍‍	4	–	6	–	1	.409	6	–	10	–	3	.395
Chicago State ‍‍‍	3	–	6	–	2	.364	5	–	9	–	5	.395
Mercyhurst ^{#} ‍‍‍	3	–	6	–	2	.364	3	–	13	–	3	.237
Le Moyne ^{#} ‍‍‍	2	–	6	–	3	.318	2	–	13	–	4	.211
Saint Francis (PA) ‍‍‍	0	–	9	–	2	.091	0	–	14	–	4	.111
New Haven ^{#} ‍‍‍	0	–	10	–	1	.045	0	–	15	–	1	.031
† – Conference champion ‡ – 2025 NEC Tournament champion y – Invited to the NCAA Tournament^{#} – Ineligible for post-season (In transition); As of December 9, 2025; Rankings from United Soccer Coaches Poll; Source:Northeast Conference

2025 Ohio Valley Conference women's soccer standings
	Conf.						Overall
Team	W		L		T	PCT	W		L		T	PCT
Tennessee Tech ‍†‍‡‍^{y}	6	–	0	–	3	.833	7	–	7	–	8	.500
Little Rock ‍‍‍	5	–	0	–	4	.778	7	–	4	–	6	.588
Lindenwood ‍‍‍	5	–	2	–	2	.667	10	–	5	–	5	.625
Eastern Illinois ‍‍‍	5	–	3	–	1	.611	8	–	8	–	3	.500
Southern Indiana ‍‍‍	4	–	2	–	3	.611	9	–	7	–	5	.548
UT Martin ‍‍‍	3	–	3	–	3	.500	3	–	7	–	9	.395
SIUE ‍‍‍	2	–	4	–	3	.389	3	–	12	–	5	.275
SEMO ‍‍‍	2	–	5	–	2	.333	2	–	15	–	2	.158
Morehead St. ‍‍‍	1	–	6	–	2	.222	3	–	13	–	2	.222
Western Illinois ‍‍‍	0	–	8	–	1	.056	1	–	17	–	1	.079
† – Conference champion ‡ – 2025 OVC Tournament champion y – Invited to the NCAA Tournament; As of December 9, 2025; Rankings from United Soccer Coaches Poll; Source:Ohio Valley Conference

2025 Patriot League women's soccer standings
	Conf.						Overall
Team	W		L		T	PCT	W		L		T	PCT
Boston U ‍†‍‍	7	–	1	–	1	.833	11	–	5	–	3	.658
Colgate ‍‍‍	6	–	2	–	1	.722	9	–	6	–	4	.579
Army West Point ‍‍‡‍^{y}	5	–	3	–	1	.611	14	–	6	–	2	.682
Holy Cross ‍‍‍	3	–	3	–	3	.500	6	–	7	–	6	.474
Lafayette ‍‍‍	3	–	3	–	3	.500	5	–	8	–	7	.425
Loyola (MD) ‍‍‍	2	–	2	–	5	.500	5	–	5	–	8	.500
Navy ‍‍‍	2	–	3	–	4	.444	9	–	6	–	4	.579
American ‍‍‍	3	–	5	–	1	.389	3	–	10	–	4	.294
Bucknell ‍‍‍	1	–	4	–	4	.333	3	–	9	–	6	.333
Lehigh ‍‍‍	1	–	7	–	1	.167	3	–	11	–	3	.265
† – Conference champion ‡ – 2025 Patriot League Tournament champion y – Invited to the NCAA Tournament; As of December 9, 2025; Rankings from United Soccer Coaches Poll; Source:Patriot League

2025 SEC women's soccer standings
	Conf.						Overall
Team	W		L		T	PCT	W		L		T	PCT
No. 17 Arkansas ‍†‍‍^{y}	7	–	1	–	2	.800	10	–	5	–	4	.632
No. 5 Vanderbilt ‍‍‡‍^{y}	7	–	2	–	1	.750	19	–	4	–	1	.813
Georgia ‍‍‍^{y}	6	–	1	–	3	.750	11	–	5	–	5	.643
Tennessee ‍‍‍^{y}	6	–	2	–	2	.700	12	–	4	–	3	.711
No. 16 LSU ‍‍‍^{y}	5	–	2	–	3	.650	15	–	7	–	3	.660
Kentucky ‍‍‍^{y}	5	–	2	–	3	.650	12	–	5	–	4	.667
South Carolina ‍‍‍^{y}	4	–	2	–	4	.600	10	–	5	–	5	.625
Mississippi St. ‍‍‍^{y}	5	–	4	–	1	.550	12	–	7	–	1	.625
Oklahoma ‍‍‍	3	–	4	–	3	.450	10	–	5	–	4	.632
Alabama ‍‍‍^{y}	4	–	6	–	0	.400	12	–	9	–	1	.568
Florida ‍‍‍	2	–	3	–	5	.450	6	–	7	–	5	.472
Auburn ‍‍‍	1	–	3	–	6	.400	5	–	6	–	7	.472
Texas A&M ‍‍‍	2	–	6	–	2	.300	5	–	7	–	5	.441
Texas ‍‍‍	2	–	8	–	0	.200	4	–	12	–	1	.265
Missouri ‍‍‍	1	–	7	–	2	.200	4	–	10	–	3	.324
Ole Miss ‍‍‍	0	–	7	–	3	.150	4	–	8	–	3	.367
† – Conference champion ‡ – 2025 SEC Tournament champion y – Invited to the NCAA Tournament; As of December 9, 2025; Rankings from United Soccer Coaches Poll; Source: SEC

2025 Southern Conference women's soccer standings
	Conf.						Overall
Team	W		L		T	PCT	W		L		T	PCT
Samford ‍†‍‡‍^{y}	7	–	0	–	2	.889	13	–	3	–	5	.738
Western Carolina ‍‍‍	5	–	2	–	2	.667	10	–	6	–	4	.600
ETSU ‍‍‍	4	–	1	–	4	.667	9	–	4	–	6	.632
Chattanooga ‍‍‍	4	–	2	–	3	.611	10	–	5	–	4	.632
Furman ‍‍‍	3	–	2	–	4	.556	10	–	4	–	5	.658
Mercer ‍‍‍	3	–	3	–	3	.500	10	–	7	–	3	.575
UNC Greensboro ‍‍‍	2	–	4	–	3	.389	4	–	12	–	3	.289
Wofford ‍‍‍	2	–	4	–	3	.389	6	–	9	–	6	.429
The Citadel ‍‍‍	2	–	5	–	2	.333	5	–	9	–	3	.382
VMI ‍‍‍	0	–	9	–	0	.000	2	–	17	–	1	.125
† – Conference champion ‡ – 2025 SoCON Tournament champion y – Invited to the NCAA Tournament; As of December 9, 2025; Rankings from United Soccer Coaches Poll; Source:SoCon

2025 Southland Conference women's soccer standings
	Conf.						Overall
Team	W		L		T	PCT	W		L		T	PCT
Northwestern St ‍†‍‍	7	–	2	–	1	.750	13	–	5	–	3	.690
Stephen F. Austin ‍‍‍	5	–	1	–	4	.700	8	–	4	–	10	.591
SE Louisiana ‍‍‍	5	–	3	–	2	.600	6	–	8	–	4	.444
East Texas A&M ‍‍‍	4	–	2	–	4	.600	7	–	8	–	4	.474
Houston Christian ‍‍‡‍^{y}	4	–	4	–	2	.500	12	–	9	–	2	.565
Lamar ‍‍‍	3	–	3	–	4	.500	7	–	8	–	5	.475
Texas A&M-CC ‍‍‍	3	–	4	–	3	.450	5	–	8	–	6	.421
McNeese ‍‍‍	3	–	5	–	2	.400	4	–	12	–	4	.300
UT Rio Grande Valley ‍‍‍	3	–	6	–	1	.350	6	–	10	–	2	.389
Incarnate Word ‍‍‍	2	–	5	–	3	.350	4	–	8	–	4	.375
Nicholls ‍‍‍	1	–	5	–	4	.300	4	–	9	–	5	.361
† – Conference champion ‡ – 2025 Southland Tournament champion y – Invited to the NCAA Tournament; As of December 9, 2025; Rankings from United Soccer Coaches Poll; Source:Southland Conference

2025 SWAC women's soccer standings
	Conf.						Overall
Team	W		L		T	PCT	W		L		T	PCT
Grambling State ‍‍‡‍^{y}	5	–	0	–	3	.813	11	–	7	–	5	.587
Jackson State ‍†‍‍	6	–	1	–	1	.813	9	–	7	–	3	.553
Alabama A&M ‍‍‍	5	–	2	–	1	.688	9	–	8	–	1	.528
Texas Southern ‍‍‍	5	–	2	–	1	.688	8	–	7	–	4	.526
Prairie View A&M ‍‍‍	4	–	3	–	1	.563	5	–	10	–	2	.353
Alcorn State ‍‍‍	3	–	3	–	2	.500	4	–	8	–	4	.375
Southern ‍‍‍	2	–	5	–	1	.313	3	–	11	–	1	.233
Alabama State ‍‍‍	1	–	7	–	0	.125	2	–	16	–	1	.132
UAPB ‍‍‍	0	–	8	–	0	.000	1	–	13	–	0	.071
Mississippi Valley State ‍‍‍	0	–	0	–	0	–	0	–	3	–	0	.000
† – Conference champion ‡ – 2025 SWAC Tournament champion y – Invited to the NCAA Tournament; As of December 9, 2025; Rankings from United Soccer Coaches Poll; Source: SWAC

2025 Summit League women's soccer standings
	Conf.						Overall
Team	W		L		T	PCT	W		L		T	PCT
Oral Roberts ‍†‍‍	6	–	1	–	1	.813	13	–	5	–	2	.700
Denver ‍†‍‍	6	–	1	–	1	.813	9	–	5	–	4	.611
South Dakota State ‍‍‡‍^{y}	4	–	1	–	3	.688	13	–	3	–	6	.727
Kansas City ‍‍‍	3	–	3	–	2	.500	9	–	8	–	3	.525
South Dakota ‍‍‍	3	–	3	–	2	.500	7	–	6	–	6	.526
Omaha ‍‍‍	3	–	4	–	1	.438	6	–	9	–	4	.421
North Dakota ‍‍‍	2	–	4	–	2	.375	8	–	7	–	3	.528
North Dakota State ‍‍‍	1	–	6	–	1	.188	5	–	12	–	1	.306
St. Thomas ‍‍‍	0	–	5	–	3	.188	3	–	9	–	4	.313
† – Conference champion ‡ – Summit League tournament champion y – Invited to the NCAA tournament As of December 9, 2025; Rankings from United Soccer Coaches Poll; Source: Summit League

2025 Sun Belt Conference women's soccer standings
	Conf.						Overall
Team	W		L		T	PCT	W		L		T	PCT
East
Old Dominion ‍†‍‍	6	–	1	–	3	.750	11	–	3	–	4	.722
James Madison ‍‍‍	5	–	2	–	3	.650	9	–	4	–	6	.632
Marshall ‍‍‍	4	–	2	–	4	.600	8	–	5	–	4	.588
Georgia State ‍‍‍	5	–	4	–	1	.550	9	–	8	–	2	.526
Appalachian State ‍‍‍	3	–	4	–	3	.450	7	–	7	–	3	.500
Coastal Carolina ‍‍‍	0	–	2	–	8	.400	3	–	5	–	8	.438
Georgia Southern ‍‍‍	0	–	5	–	5	.250	2	–	10	–	6	.278
West
UL Monroe ‍‍‍	6	–	0	–	4	.800	13	–	3	–	4	.750
South Alabama ‍†‍‍	6	–	1	–	3	.750	10	–	4	–	4	.667
Texas State ‍‍‡‍^{y}	5	–	1	–	4	.700	10	–	4	–	7	.643
Louisiana ‍‍‍	4	–	3	–	3	.550	7	–	6	–	5	.528
Arkansas State ‍‍‍	2	–	6	–	2	.300	4	–	7	–	4	.400
Troy ‍‍‍	0	–	7	–	3	.150	5	–	9	–	3	.382
Southern Miss ‍‍‍	1	–	9	–	0	.100	2	–	14	–	1	.147
† – Conference champion ‡ – 2025 Sun Belt Tournament champion y – Invited to the NCAA Tournament; As of December 9, 2025; Rankings from United Soccer Coaches Poll; Source:Sun Belt

2025 West Coast Conference women's soccer standings
	Conf.						Overall
Team	W		L		T	PCT	W		L		T	PCT
Pepperdine ‍†‍‍^{y}	8	–	2	–	1	.773	11	–	7	–	2	.600
Saint Mary's ‍‍‍	7	–	1	–	3	.773	12	–	2	–	4	.778
Portland ‍‍‍	7	–	1	–	3	.773	10	–	3	–	6	.684
Seattle ‍‍‍	6	–	3	–	2	.636	10	–	3	–	6	.684
Gonzaga ‍‍‍	6	–	3	–	2	.636	8	–	9	–	2	.474
Santa Clara ‍‍‍	4	–	2	–	5	.591	8	–	6	–	5	.553
Washington State ‍‍‍	5	–	4	–	2	.545	7	–	7	–	5	.500
Loyola Marymount ‍‍‍	2	–	5	–	4	.364	5	–	7	–	5	.441
San Francisco ‍‍‍	2	–	7	–	2	.273	3	–	11	–	4	.278
Pacific ‍‍‍	1	–	6	–	4	.273	4	–	9	–	6	.368
San Diego ‍‍‍	1	–	7	–	3	.227	4	–	7	–	7	.417
Oregon State ‍‍‍	1	–	9	–	1	.136	2	–	12	–	5	.237
† – Conference champion y – Invited to the NCAA Tournament; As of December 9, 2025; Rankings from United Soccer Coaches Poll; Source:West Coast Conference

2025 WAC women's soccer standings
	Conf.						Overall
Team	W		L		T	PCT	W		L		T	PCT
Utah Valley ‍†‍‍	9	–	0	–	1	.950	14	–	5	–	3	.705
California Baptist ‍‍‡‍^{y}	6	–	3	–	1	.650	10	–	9	–	4	.522
Utah Tech ‍‍‍	4	–	4	–	2	.500	8	–	7	–	5	.525
Abilene Christian ‍‍‍	2	–	5	–	3	.350	6	–	11	–	3	.375
Tarleton State ‍‍‍	1	–	5	–	4	.300	7	–	7	–	6	.500
Southern Utah ‍‍‍	2	–	7	–	1	.250	3	–	12	–	3	.250
† – Conference champion ‡ – 2025 WAC Tournament champion y – Invited to the NCAA Tournament; As of December 9, 2025; Rankings from United Soccer Coaches Poll; Source:WAC

2025 NCAA Division I independents women's soccer records
	Conf.							Overall
Team	W		L	T	PCT			W		L	T	PCT
South Carolina State ‍‍‍		–		–		2	–	14	–	0	.125
y – Invited to the NCAA Tournament; As of December 9, 2025; Rankings from United Soccer Coaches Poll

=== Conference winners and tournaments ===
Conference	Regular Season Champion(s)	Tournament Winner	Conference Tournament	Tournament Dates	Tournament Venue (City)
America East	Binghamton	Maine	2025 Tournament	November 2 – 9	Campus sites, hosted by higher seed
American	Memphis	UTSA	2025 Tournament	November 3 – 9	Premier Sports Campus • Lakewood Ranch, Florida
ACC	Stanford		2025 Tournament	November 2 – 9	First Round: Campus sites, hosted by higher seeds Semifinals and final: WakeMed Soccer Park • Cary, North Carolina
Atlantic 10	Dayton		2025 Tournament	October 31 – November 9	Campus sites, hosted by higher seed
ASUN	Lipscomb (Note: Top seed in conference tournament.) (Gold Division)	Lipscomb	2025 Tournament	October 30 – November 9	Campus sites, hosted by higher seed
ASUN	Florida Gulf Coast (Graphite Division)	Lipscomb	2025 Tournament	October 30 – November 9	Campus sites, hosted by higher seed
Big East	Georgetown	Xavier	2025 Tournament	November 6 – 9	Maryland SoccerPlex • Boyds, Maryland
Big Sky	Montana		2025 Tournament	November 5 – 9	South Campus Stadium • Missoula, Montana
Big South	Radford	High Point	2025 Tournament	November 1 – 9	Quarterfinals: Campus sites, hosted by higher seed Semifinals and final: Sportsplex at Matthews • Matthews, North Carolina
Big Ten	Washington		2025 Tournament	October 30 – November 9	Quarterfinals: Folk Field • West Lafayette, Indiana; Semifinals and final: Energizer Park • St. Louis, Missouri
Big 12	TCU	BYU	2025 Tournament	November 3 – 8	Quarterfinals and semifinals: Garvey-Rosenthal Stadium • Fort Worth, Texas; Final: Betty Lou Mays Soccer Field • Waco, Texas
Big West	Cal State Northridge	Cal Poly	2025 Tournament	November 2 – 9	Quarterfinals: Campus sites, hosted by higher seed Semifinals and final: Regular season champion
CAA	Monmouth (North Division)	Elon	2025 Tournament	October 30 – November 9	Quarterfinals and semifinals: Campus sites, hosted by top two seeds Final: Hosted by top remaining seed
CAA	UNC Wilmington (South Division)	Elon	2025 Tournament	October 30 – November 9	Quarterfinals and semifinals: Campus sites, hosted by top two seeds Final: Hosted by top remaining seed
CUSA	Liberty; Western Kentucky	Liberty	2025 Tournament	November 2 – 7	Osborne Stadium • Lynchburg, Virginia
Horizon	Milwaukee		2025 Tournament	November 2 – 8	Quarterfinals: Campus sites, hosted by higher seed Semifinals and final: Hosted by regular-season champion
Ivy	Princeton	Dartmouth	2025 Tournament	November 6 – 9	Hosted by regular-season champion
MAAC	Fairfield	Sacred Heart	2025 Tournament	November 2 – 9	Campus sites, hosted by higher seed
MAC	Western Michigan		2025 Tournament	November 1 – 7	Historic Crew Stadium • Columbus, Ohio
Missouri Valley	Drake	UIC	2025 Tournament	November 2 – 9	Campus sites, hosted by higher seed
Mountain West	Boise State	Utah State	2025 Tournament	November 2 – 8	Boas Soccer Complex • Boise, Idaho
NEC	Fairleigh Dickinson	Wagner	2025 Tournament	November 6 – 9	Campus sites, hosted by higher seed
Ohio Valley	Tennessee Tech		2025 Tournament	October 30 – November 9	Campus sites, hosted by higher seed
Patriot	Boston University	Army West Point	2025 Tournament	November 2 – 9	Campus sites, hosted by higher seed
SEC	Arkansas	LSU	2025 Tournament	November 2 – 9	Ashton Brosnaham Soccer Complex • Pensacola, Florida
SoCon	Samford		2025 Tournament	October 28 – November 9	Campus sites, hosted by higher seed
Southland	Northwestern State	Houston Christian	2025 Tournament	November 4 – 9	Lamar Soccer Complex • Beaumont, Texas
SWAC	Jackson State	Grambling State	2025 Tournament	November 6 – 9	PVAMU Soccer Complex • Prairie View, Texas
Summit	Oral Roberts; Denver	South Dakota State	2025 Tournament	November 1 – 9	Quarterfinals: Campus sites, hosted by higher seeds Semifinals and Final: Hosted by regular-season champion
Sun Belt	Old Dominion (East Division)	Texas State	2025 Tournament	November 3 – 8	Foley Sports Tourism Complex • Foley, Alabama
Sun Belt	South Alabama (West Division)	Texas State	2025 Tournament	November 3 – 8	Foley Sports Tourism Complex • Foley, Alabama
WAC	Utah Valley	California Baptist	2025 Tournament	November 5 – 8	UCCU Stadium • Orem, Utah
WCC	Pepperdine	No Tournament			

== Postseason ==
=== Final rankings ===
Rank	United Soccer Coaches	TopDrawerSoccer.com
1	Florida State	Florida State
2	Stanford	Stanford
3	Duke	TCU
4	TCU	Duke
5	Vanderbilt	Washington
6	Washington	Vanderbilt
7	Michigan State	Michigan State
8	Virginia	Ohio State
9	Ohio Stateт	Colorado
10	Georgetownт	Virginia
11	Notre Dame	BYU
12	Colorado	LSU
13	North Carolinaт	Georgetown
14	Kansasт	Baylor
15	Baylor	Kansas
16	LSU	North Carolina
17	Arkansas	Notre Dame
18	Memphis	Memphis
19	West Virginia	Xavier
20	BYU	Texas Tech
21	Iowa	Arkansas
22	UCLA	Louisville
23	Wisconsin	West Virginia
24	Louisville	UCLA
25	Xavier	Wisconsin

== Award winners ==
=== All-America teams ===
2025 United Soccer Coaches All-America Teams
First Team	Second Team	Third Team	Fourth Team
Jordan Nytes – Colorado; Elise Evans – Stanford; Leah Klenke – Notre Dame; Finley Lavin – Memphis; Hannah McLaughlin – Vanderbilt; Summer Denigan – Georgia; Lia Godfrey – Virginia; Ally Perry – Mississippi State; Kat Rader – Duke; Jasmine Aikey – Stanford; Seven Castain – TCU; Jordynn Dudley – Florida State; Izzy Engle – Notre Dame; Hope Leyba – Colorado; Sydney Watts – Vanderbilt	Sara Wojdelko – Vanderbilt; Macy Blackburn – Texas Tech; Karsyn Cherry – Louisville; Gracie Falla – South Carolina; Jennie Immethun – UCLA; Kolo Suliafu – Washington; Kayla Briggs – Michigan State; Maribel Flores – USC; Tyler Isgrig – Baylor; Kennedy Bell – Michigan State; Annabelle Chukwu – Notre Dame; Maja Lardner – Georgetown; Mia Minestrella – Duke; Ellie Walbruch – BYU	Valentina Amaral – Wake Forest; Cara Martin – Georgetown; Morgan Brown – TCU; Heather Gilchrist – Florida State; Maggie Illig – Michigan State; Faith Leyba – Colorado; Bella Carapazza – Lipscomb; Emma Egizii – UCLA; Lucy Kesler – BYU; Charlotte Kohler – Stanford; Katie Shea Collins – South Carolina; Samantha Erbach – Xavier; Ashley Henderson – Memphis; Chioma Okafor – Connecticut; Olivia Thomas – North Carolina; Taylor White – West Virginia	Molly Pritchard – Ohio State; Natalie Bain – Xavier; Ally Brown – Tennessee; Caroline Castans – Kansas; Mirann Gacioch – Ohio State; Laney Rouse – Virginia; Mac Midgley – Tennessee; Linda Ullmark – North Carolina; Talia Sommer – Butler; Alex Buck – Washington; Ginny Lackey – James Madison; Kaitlyn MacBean – Penn State; Gianna Paul – Alabama; Kennedy Roesch – Northwestern; Lexi Watts – Kansas

=== Major player of the year awards ===
- Hermann Trophy: Jasmine Aikey
- TopDrawerSoccer.com National Player of the Year Award: Jasmine Aikey

=== Other major awards ===
- United Soccer Coaches College Coach of the Year: Brian Pensky
- Bill Jeffrey Award: Janet Rayfield
- Jerry Yeagley Award:Amir Lowery
- Mike Berticelli Award:John Fitzgerald
- NCAA Tournament MVP: Offensive: Wrianna Hudson; Defensive: Kate Ockene

=== Conference players and coaches of the year ===
Conference	Conference Player of the Year	Offensive Player of the Year (Note: Honorees are forwards unless otherwise indicated.)	Midfielder of the Year	Defensive Player of the Year (Note: Honorees are defenders unless otherwise indicated.)	Goalkeeper of the Year	Rookie of the Year	Coach of the Year
ACC	—N/a	Izzy Engle, Notre Dame	Lia Godfrey, Virginia	Elise Evans, Stanford	Caroline Birkel, Stanford	Kylie Maxwell, Wake Forest	Paul Ratcliffe, Stanford
America East	—N/a	Briana Andreoli, NJIT (Note: This conference's award is styled as "Striker of the Year".)	Anna Buckwalter, Binghamton; Abbi Maier, New Hampshire	Sophia Garofalo, Binghamton	Kylee Carafoli, Vermont	Nora Belin, UMass Lowell	Binghamton Bearcats (Note: This conference's award is awarded to the "Coaching Staff of the Year".)
American	—N/a	Ashley Henderson, Memphis	Ai Kitagawa, Memphis	Finley Lavin, Memphis	Abby Kudla, Memphis	Ellis Kelly, Memphis; Jadyn Jaeger, Rice	Memphis Tigers
ASUN	Erika Zschuppe, Florida Gulf Coast	—N/a	Erika Zschuppe, Florida Gulf Coast	Lauren Dwyer, Florida Gulf Coast	Madison Vukas, North Alabama	Skylar Cole, Lipscomb	Kevin O'Brien, Lipscomb
Atlantic 10	—N/a	Maya Matesa, Duquesne	Liv Grenda, Dayton	Kyra Karfonta, Dayton	Batoul Reda, Dayton	Renata Mercedes, Fordham; Caroline Chier, Saint Louis	Eric Golz, Dayton
Big East	—N/a	Maja Lardner, Georgetown	Talia Sommer, Butler; Samantha Erbach, Xavier	Natalie Bain, Xavier	Cara Martin, Georgetown	Avrie Nelsen, Villanova	Georgetown Hoyas
Big Sky	—N/a	Delani Walker, Eastern Washington; Micala Boex, Northern Arizona	—N/a	Ally Henrikson, Montana	Ashlyn Dvorak, Montana	Lauren Butorac, Weber State; Presley Ray, Weber State (Note: This conference also awards the "Top Newcomer".)	Kyle Christensen, Weber State
Big South	—N/a	Riley O'Bryan, USC Upstate (Note: This conference's award is styled as "Forward of the Year".)	Lilly Short, Radford	Amani Green, Radford	Savannah Dixon, Gardner-Webb	Sam Fischer, Longwood	Radford Highlanders
Big Ten	—N/a	Kennedy Bell, Michigan State	Maribel Flores, USC	Kolo Suliafu, Washington	Molly Pritchard, Ohio State	Bella Winn, UCLA	Nicole Van Dyke, Washington
Big 12	—N/a	Hope Leyba, Colorado	Tyler Isgrig, Baylor	Macy Blackburn, Texas Tech	Jordan Nytes, Colorado	Kamdyn Fuller, TCU	Eric Bell, TCU
Big West	—N/a	Annika Smith, Cal Poly	Mai Colombini, UC Irvine	Brennan Cole, Cal Poly	Isaac Ranson, Cal State Fullerton	Ava Tibor, UC San Diego	Gina Brewer, Cal State Northridge
CAA	—N/a	Hailey Longwell, UNC Wilmington (Note: This conference's award is styled as "Attacking Player of the Year".)	Linn Beck, Stony Brook	Grace Gelhaus, Elon	Eliza Teplow, Northeastern	Ellie Leffler, William & Mary	Chris Neal, UNC Wilmington
CUSA	Ivy Garner, Liberty	Ivy Garner, Liberty	Georgia Liapis, Western Kentucky	Lauren Littleton, Liberty	Peyton Huber, Liberty	Makenna Egan, Western Kentucky	Jason Neidell, Western Kentucky
Horizon	Mallory McGuire, Milwaukee	Mallory McGuire, Milwaukee (Note: Mallory McGuire is a midfielder.)	—N/a	Ellie Rebmann, Milwaukee	Bella Hollenbach, Milwaukee	Kamryn Rosa, Youngstown State	Kevin Boyd, Milwaukee
Ivy	—N/a	Joy Okonye, Brown	—N/a	Drew Coomans, Princeton	—N/a	Anna Leschly, Dartmouth	Dartmouth Big Green
MAAC	—N/a	Maddy Theriault, Fairfield (Note: This conference's award is styled as "Golden Boot".)	—N/a	Meghan Carragher, Fairfield	Katie Wright, Fairfield (Note: This conference's award is styled as "Golden Glove".)	Kylie Fuller, Merrimac	David Barrett, Fairfield
MAC	—N/a	Addie Chester, Ball State	Drew Martin, Western Michigan	Mira Pierre-Webster, Western Michigan	Lexie Thompson, Buffalo	Reagan Sulaver, Western Michigan	Lewis Robinson, Western Michigan
Missouri Valley	Mary Hardy, Murray State	—N/a	—N/a	Megan Wilson, Murray State	Madi Valenti, Illinois State	Kiara Desiderio, Valparaiso	Drake Bulldogs; Murray State Racers
Mountain West	—N/a	Annika Jost, Air Force	—N/a	Ava De Leest, Boise State	—N/a	Ava De Leest, Boise State (Note: This conference's award is styled as the "Newcomer of the Year".)	Laura Busby, Air Force
NEC	—N/a	Hannah Anselmo, Stonehill	Laura Martinez, Fairleigh Dickinson	Emma Radoncic, Central Connecticut	Melina Ford, Central Connecticut	Gabrielle Smith, Central Connecticut	Eric Teepe, Fairleigh Dickinson
Ohio Valley	—N/a	Maria Schuller, Little Rock	Lucia Cuadra, Tennessee Tech	Claire Palya, Tennessee Tech	Ella Kratochvil, Eastern Illinois	Camylle Graves, Eastern Illinois; Ava Huntrods, UT Martin	Corey Boyd, Tennessee Tech
Patriot	—N/a	Brigid Duffy, Army	Giulianna Gianino, Boston University	Helene Tyburczy, Boston University	Aubrey Haesche, Holy Cross	Sophia Henry, Army	Boston University Terriers
SEC	—N/a	Sydney Watts, Vanderbilt	Ally Perry, Mississippi State	Gracie Falla, South Carolina	Sara Wojdelko, Vanderbilt	Ava McDonald, Texas; Larkin Thomason, Alabama (Note: This conference also awards the "Newcomer of the Year".)	Colby Hale, Arkansas
SoCon	Sam De Luca, Samford	—N/a	—N/a	Ava Robitaille, Western Carolina	—N/a	Quinn Johnson, Chattanooga	Todd Yelton, Samford
Southland	Emily Senatore, Northwestern State	Lauren Smith, Lamar	Emily Senatore, Northwestern State	Jessica Spitzer, Northwestern State	Sierra McCluer, Stephen F. Austin	Hosane Soukou, Northwestern State; Lauren Smith, Lamar	Ian Brophy, Northwestern State
SWAC	—N/a	Czaske Deane, Alabama A&M	Annick Zouma, Alcorn State	Kaylen Jankans, Grambling State	Taylor Osborn, Jackson State	Annick Zouma, Alcorn State; Larissa Joso Luma, Alcorn State	Ted Flogaites, Jackson State
Summit	—N/a	Julia Thasaphong, Oral Roberts	Hannah Tate, Denver	Emma Thielbahr, Denver	Mallorie Benhart, South Dakota State	Klarissa Vega, South Dakota	Austin Risenhoover, Oral Roberts
Sun Belt	Skylar Blaise, ULM	Ginny Lackey, James Madison	Miku Kurihara, Louisiana	Ashlynn Kulha, Old Dominion	Sierra Giorgio, South Alabama	Carson Glenn, Louisiana; Salma Elhaimer, Louisiana	Will Roberts, Louisiana-Monroe
WAC	—N/a	Ruby Hladek, Utah Valley	—N/a	Mia Owens, Utah Valley	Mikayla O'Brien, California Baptist	Jocelyn Wright, Utah Tech	Chris Lemay, Utah Valley
WCC	—N/a	Caroline Penner, Seattle	Tabitha LaParl, Pepperdine	Keeley Dockter, Portland	Kate Plachy, Saint Mary's	Samantha Snorsky, Gonzaga	Theresa Romagnolo, Saint Mary's

== See also ==
- College soccer
- List of NCAA Division I women's soccer programs
- 2025 in American soccer
- 2025 NCAA Division I women's soccer tournament
- 2025 NCAA Division I men's soccer season
