= Kennedy Bell =

American soccer player (born 2005)

Personal information
- Date of birth: 2005 (age 20–21)
- Height: 5 ft 7 in (1.70 m)
- Position: Striker

Team information
- Current team: Michigan State Spartans
- Number: 24

Youth career
- Charlotte SA

College career
Years	Team	Apps	(Gls)
2023–2024	Maryland Terrapins	36	(3)
2025–	Michigan State Spartans	42	(19)

Senior career*
Years	Team	Apps	(Gls)
2023	Asheville City SC	7	(0)
2024–2025	Carolina Ascent (USL W)	6	(0)
- * Club domestic league appearances and goals

Kennedy Bell (born 2005) is an American college soccer player who plays as a striker for the Michigan State Spartans. She previously played for the Maryland Terrapins. She was named the Big Ten Forward of the Year with the Spartans in 2025.

== Early life ==
Bell grew up in Charlotte, North Carolina. She began playing soccer as a kindergartener and decided to focus on the sport at age eight or nine. She played club soccer for Charlotte Soccer Academy, serving as team captain and being named ECNL All-American and the Conference Co-Player of the Year in 2022. Though she played defender for club, she played midfielder for Hough High School and was named the Queen City 3A/4A Player of the Year after scoring 18 goals with 16 assists as a junior in 2022. She committed to Maryland in her junior year. TopDrawerSoccer ranked her the 34th-best recruit in the 2023 class.

== College career ==
Bell started all 18 games for the Maryland Terrapins as a freshman in 2023, earning Big Ten Conference all-freshman honors. She moved from right back to winger as a sophomore in 2024, starting 18 games and leading the team in points with 3 goals and 2 assists. She then transferred to the Michigan State Spartans, where her father played college football, before her junior season in 2025. Michigan State head coach Jeff Hosler converted Bell to striker, a move that paid off immediately. She led the Big Ten with 11 goals and added 7 assists in 25 games. She helped the Spartans to runner-up finishes for the Big Ten regular-season and tournament titles, drawing a penalty in the final against Washington and making hers in the shootout loss. Michigan State earned a program-best two seed in the NCAA tournament and reached the quarterfinals for the first time. Bell was named second-team All-American, first-team All-Big Ten, and the Big Ten Forward of the Year.

== International career ==
Bell was called into training camps with the United States under-15 team in 2019 and 2020. She went to camps with the under-20 team in 2025.

== Personal life ==
Bell is the daughter of Kimberly and Myron Bell and has two brothers. Her father played eight seasons in the National Football League (NFL) for the Pittsburgh Steelers and the Cincinnati Bengals. Her brother Corey played college football for North Carolina.

== Honors and awards ==
Individual

- Second-team All-American: 2025
- First-team All-Big Ten: 2025, 2026
- Big Ten Forward of the Year: 2025
- Big Ten all-freshman team: 2023
