= Batoul Reda =

American soccer player (born 2004)

Personal information
- Date of birth: October 24, 2004 (age 22)
- Height: 5 ft 8 in (1.73 m)
- Position: Goalkeeper

Youth career
- Michigan Jaguars

College career
Years	Team	Apps	(Gls)
2022–2025	Dayton Flyers	79	(0)

Batoul Reda (born October 24, 2004) is an American soccer player who plays as a goalkeeper. She played college soccer for the Dayton Flyers, setting the program record for career shutouts.

== Early life ==
Reda grew up in Dearborn, Michigan, the daughter of Ahmad Reda and Saada Bazzi, and has three sisters. Her parents are from Lebanon. Reda began playing soccer at forward before moving to goal when her rec team needed someone there. She also played basketball growing up and set multiple school records at Fordson High School, including most points in a game (41). She played GA club soccer for the Michigan Jaguars. She committed to play college soccer for the Dayton Flyers.

== College career ==
Reda played in 18 games, starting 15, and kept 6 clean sheets for the Dayton Flyers as a freshman in 2022, earning Atlantic 10 (A-10) all-rookie honors and helping the Flyers to the A-10 tournament final. She started 19 games and had 10 clean sheets (plus one combined shutout) as a sophomore in 2023. In her junior year in 2024, she started all 20 games and kept 11 shutouts and was named to the All-A-10 second team. She had a breakout senior year in 2025, starting all 22 games and setting a program record with 15 clean sheets. She also became the career shutout leader in program history. The same year, she helped lead the Flyers to a 10–0 conference record, winning their first A-10 regular-season title since 2013. She then helped the Flyers win the A-10 tournament, being named tournament MVP, and earn their first NCAA tournament berth since 2016. She was named first-team All-A-10 and the A-10 Goalkeeper of the Year. TopDrawerSoccer named her to their second-team Best XI and ranked her as 12th-best player and second-best goalkeeper in the nation.

== Club career ==
Reda joined the Houston Dash as a non-roster invitee in the 2026 preseason.

== International career ==
Reda was called into training camp with the United States under-19 team in January 2023.

== Honors and awards ==
Dayton Flyers

- Atlantic 10 Conference: 2025
- Atlantic 10 Conference tournament: 2025

Individual

- Atlantic 10 Conference Goalkeeper of the Year: 2025
- First-team All-A-10: 2025
- Second-team All-A-10: 2024
- A-10 all-rookie team: 2022
- A-10 tournament MVP: 2025
- A-10 tournament all-tournament team: 2022, 2025
