= 2025 Ohio Valley Conference women's soccer tournament =

- Classification: Division I
- Teams: 8
- Matches: 7
- Attendance: 1,865
- Site: Tech Soccer Field; Cookeville, Tennessee (Semifinals & Final)
- Champions: Tennessee Tech (2nd title)
- Winning coach: Corey Boyd (1st title)
- MVP: Maggie Conrad (Tennessee Tech)
- Broadcast: ESPN+

2025 Ohio Valley Conference women's soccer standings
	Conf.						Overall
Team	W		L		T	PCT	W		L		T	PCT
Tennessee Tech ‍†‍‡‍^{y}	6	–	0	–	3	.833	7	–	7	–	8	.500
Little Rock ‍‍‍	5	–	0	–	4	.778	7	–	4	–	6	.588
Lindenwood ‍‍‍	5	–	2	–	2	.667	10	–	5	–	5	.625
Eastern Illinois ‍‍‍	5	–	3	–	1	.611	8	–	8	–	3	.500
Southern Indiana ‍‍‍	4	–	2	–	3	.611	9	–	7	–	5	.548
UT Martin ‍‍‍	3	–	3	–	3	.500	3	–	7	–	9	.395
SIUE ‍‍‍	2	–	4	–	3	.389	3	–	12	–	5	.275
SEMO ‍‍‍	2	–	5	–	2	.333	2	–	15	–	2	.158
Morehead St. ‍‍‍	1	–	6	–	2	.222	3	–	13	–	2	.222
Western Illinois ‍‍‍	0	–	8	–	1	.056	1	–	17	–	1	.079
† – Conference champion ‡ – 2025 OVC Tournament champion y – Invited to the NCAA Tournament; As of December 9, 2025; Rankings from United Soccer Coaches Poll; Source:Ohio Valley Conference

The 2025 Ohio Valley Conference women's soccer tournament was the postseason women's soccer tournament for the Ohio Valley Conference held from October 30 through November 9, 2025. The first round and quarterfinals of the tournament were held at campus sites hosted by the #3 and #4 seeds, while the semifinals and final took place at Tech Soccer Field in Cookeville, Tennessee. The eight-team single-elimination tournament consisted of four rounds based on seeding from regular season conference play. The Lindenwood were the defending champions. and were unable to defend their title as they lost to Tennessee Tech 2–0 in the Final. The conference tournament title was the second for the Tennessee Tech women's soccer program, and the first for head coach Corey Boyd. This was Tennessee Tech's first tournament title since 2000. As tournament champions, Tennessee Tech earned the Ohio Valley's automatic berth into the 2025 NCAA Division I women's soccer tournament.

== Seeding ==
Eight of the ten teams in the Ohio Valley Conference qualified for the 2025 Tournament. The #1 seed was awarded as the host institution for the Semifinals and Finals of the tournament. The #1 and #2 seed received byes to the Semifinals, while the #4 and #5 seeds received byes to the Quarterfinals. Seeds were seeded based on regular season records. No tiebreakers were required as each team finished with a unique regular season record.

Seed	School	Conference Record	Points
1	Tennessee Tech	6–0–3	21
2	Little Rock	5–0–4	19
3	Lindenwood	5–2–2	17
4	Eastern Illinois	5–3–1	16
5	Southern Indiana	4–2–3	15
6	UT Martin	3–3–3	12
7	SIU Edwardsville	2–4–3	9
8	Southeast Missouri State	2–5–2	8

== Bracket ==
First round Thursday, Oct. 30
5	Southern Indiana	2
8	Southeast Missouri State	0
6	UT Martin	0 (5)
7	SIU Edwardsville (pen.)	0 (6)

Quarterfinals; Sunday, Nov. 2
4	Eastern Illinois	0
5	Southern Indiana	3
3	Lindenwood	1
7	SIU Edwardsville	0

Semifinals; Thursday, Nov. 6
1	Tennessee Tech (pen.)	0 (4)
5	Southern Indiana	0 (3)
2	Little Rock	1
3	Lindenwood (a.e.t.)	2

Final; Sunday, Nov. 9
1	Tennessee Tech	2
3	Lindenwood	0

== Schedule ==
=== First round ===
October 30	(5) Southern Indiana	2–0	(8) Southeast Missouri State	Charleston, IL
12:00 p.m. CDT	Team (yellow card) 66'; Charli Grafton 79'; Emma Schut 85'	Report		Stadium: Lakeside Soccer Field; Attendance: 113; Referee: Ricardo Segobiano; Assistant referees: Steven Cowles; Michael Witsman; Fourth official: Mike Darling

October 30	(6) UT Martin	0–0 (a.e.t.) (4–5 p)	(7) SIU Edwardsville	St. Charles, MO
3:00 p.m. CDT		Report		Stadium: Hunter Stadium; Attendance: 136; Referee: Michael Heath; Assistant referees: Nigel Lear; Don Tebeau; Fourth official: Doug Helfrich
	Penalties
	Millie Perry (penalty scored); Ayja McCleary (penalty missed); Anna Østergaard Ibsen (penalty scored); Ava Huntrods (penalty scored); Unni Wolf (penalty scored); Addy McCleary (penalty missed)		(penalty scored) Savannah DeFini; (penalty scored) Claire Nieroda; (penalty scored) Aleah Minehart; (penalty scored) MaryClaire Imig; (penalty missed) Taryn Moore; (penalty scored) Kira Kumada

=== Quarterfinals ===
November 2	(4) Eastern Illinois	0–3	(5) Southern Indiana	Charleston, IL
11:30 a.m. CST	Colleen Bauer (yellow card) 49'	Report	28' Charli Grafton; 29', 52' Peyton Murphy; (yellow card) 82' Tierney Mullady	Stadium: Lakeside Soccer Field; Attendance: 229; Referee: Michael Heath; Assistant referees: Jose Renda; Joe Kohlrus; Fourth official: Erik Turley

November 2	(3) Lindenwood	1–0	(7) SIU Edwardsville	St. Charles, MO
1:00 p.m. CST	Team (yellow card) 15'; Mackenzie Compton 76'	Report	(yellow card) 61' Team; (yellow card) 78' Allie Fishering	Stadium: Hunter Stadium; Attendance: 277; Referee: Justin Tomicich; Assistant referees: Matt Geringer; Don Tebeau; Fourth official: Alexandra Weaver

=== Semifinals ===
November 6	(1) Tennessee Tech	0–0 (a.e.t.) (4–3 p)	(5) Southern Indiana	Cookeville, TN
4:00 p.m. CST		Report		Stadium: Tech Soccer Field; Attendance: 410; Referee: Todd Carver; Assistant referees: Seth Wilson; Mandi Burley; Fourth official: Kris Fabick
	Penalties
	Katie Toney (penalty missed); Krista Hardardottir (penalty missed); Melina Hamm (penalty scored); Anna Baker (penalty scored); Tori Soutuyo (penalty scored); Ebba Melin (penalty scored)		(penalty missed) Peyton Murphy; (penalty scored) Emma Schut; (penalty scored) Josie Pochocki; (penalty missed) Emma Thurston; (penalty scored) Grace Bamber; (penalty missed) Eva Boer

November 6	(2) Little Rock	1–2 (a.e.t.)	(3) Lindenwood	Cookeville, TN
7:00 p.m. CST	Amaya Arias 12', (yellow card) 39' (yellow-red card) 80'; Maggie Turner (yellow card) 54'; Maria Schuller (yellow card) 70'	Report	46' Anna Johnson; 93' Mackenzie Compton	Stadium: Tech Soccer Field; Attendance: 115; Referee: Gustavo Turmero; Assistant referees: Jessica Medley; Nicole Steiner; Fourth official: Jason Steiner

=== Final ===
November 9	(1) Tennessee Tech	2–0	(3) Lindenwood	Cookeville, TN
4:00 p.m. CST	Katie Toney 79', 79' (pen.)	Report	(yellow card) 88' Rachel Jackson	Stadium: Tech Soccer Field; Attendance: 585; Referee: Tim Stewart; Assistant referees: Jessica Medley; Lucy Bell; Fourth official: Nicole Steiner

== Statistics ==
=== Goalscorers ===
There were 11 goals scored in 7 matches, for an average of 1.57 goals per match (as of November 9, 2025).

2 goals

- Mackenzie Compton – Lindenwood
- Charli Grafton – Southern Indiana
- Peyton Murphy – Southern Indiana
- Katie Toney – Tennessee Tech

1 goal

- Amaya Arias – Little Rock
- Anna Johnson – Lindenwood
- Emma Schut – Southern Indiana

== All-Tournament team ==
Player	Team
Amaya Arias	Little Rock
Megan Rogan	Little Rock
Mackenzie Compton	Lindenwood
Rachel Jackson	Lindenwood
Anna Johnson	Lindenwood
Charli Grafton	Southern Indiana
Emma Thurston	Southern Indiana
**Maggie Conrad**	Tennessee Tech
Melina Hamm	Tennessee Tech
Ebba Melin	Tennessee Tech
Katie Toney	Tennessee Tech

MVP in bold
