= 2025 America East Conference women's soccer tournament =

- Classification: Division I
- Teams: 6
- Matches: 5
- Attendance: 3,599
- Site: Campus Sites (Higher Seed)
- Champions: Maine (3rd title)
- Winning coach: Scott Atherly (3rd title)
- MVP: Elena Barenberg (Maine)
- Broadcast: ESPN+

2025 America East Conference women's soccer standings
	Conf.						Overall
Team	W		L		T	PCT	W		L		T	PCT
Binghamton ‍†‍‍	5	–	0	–	3	.813	10	–	2	–	5	.735
Vermont ‍‍‍	5	–	1	–	2	.750	8	–	4	–	6	.611
UMass Lowell ‍‍‍	3	–	2	–	3	.563	6	–	5	–	6	.529
Maine ‍‍‡‍^{y}	3	–	3	–	2	.500	6	–	8	–	4	.444
Bryant ‍‍‍	2	–	2	–	4	.500	5	–	5	–	8	.500
New Hampshire ‍‍‍	2	–	2	–	4	.500	4	–	6	–	7	.441
NJIT ‍‍‍	2	–	3	–	3	.438	7	–	5	–	6	.556
UMBC ‍‍‍	2	–	5	–	1	.313	6	–	8	–	4	.444
Albany ‍‍‍	1	–	7	–	0	.125	2	–	13	–	2	.176
† – Conference champion ‡ – 2025 America East Tournament champion y – Invited to the NCAA Tournament; As of December 9, 2025; Rankings from United Soccer Coaches Poll; Source:America East Conference

The 2025 America East Conference women's soccer tournament was the postseason women's soccer tournament for the American East Conference that was held from November 2 through 9, 2025. The five-match tournament took place at campus sites, with the higher seed hosting. The six-team single-elimination tournament consisted of three rounds based on seeding from regular season conference play. The defending champions were the Maine Black Bears. The Black Bears successfully defended their title, defeating Vermont in a penalty shoot-out in the Final. It was the third victory in program history for Maine and the third for twenty-fourth year head coach Scott Atherly. It was also Maine's third tournament victory in a row. As tournament champions, Maine earned the America East's automatic berth into the 2025 NCAA Division I women's soccer tournament.

== Seeding ==
The top six teams in the regular season earned a spot in the tournament. Teams were seeded based on their regular season conference records. A tiebreaker was required to determine the fifth and sixth seeds, as Bryant and New Hampshire finished the regular season with a 2–2–4 record. Bryant and New Hampshire had played to a 0–0 draw on October 16; therefore, head-to-head record did not break the tie. Using the tied teams' record against the highest seed, Binghamton, Bryant had a record of 0 points, while New Hampshire had 1 point. As a result, New Hampshire earned the fifth seed.

Seed	School	Conference Record	Points
1	Binghamton	5–0–3	18
2	Vermont	5–1–2	17
3	UMass Lowell	3–2–3	12
4	Maine	3–3–2	11
5	New Hampshire	2–2–4	10
6	Bryant	2–2–4	10

== Bracket ==
Quarterfinals; Sunday, Nov. 2
4	Maine	2
5	New Hampshire	1
3	UMass Lowell	0 (3)
6	Bryant (pen.)	0 (4)

Semifinals; Thursday, Nov. 6
1	Binghamton	0
4	Maine (a.e.t.)	1
2	Vermont	3
6	Bryant	1

Final; Sunday, Nov. 9
4	Maine (pen.)	2 (4)
2	Vermont	2 (3)

== Schedule ==
=== Quarterfinals ===
November 2, 2025	#4 Maine	2–1	#5 New Hampshire	Orono, ME
12:00 EST	Jordane Pinette 46'; Gillian Rovers 67'	Box Score	Shya Walker 40'; Alyssa Gimmel (yellow card) 57'	Stadium: New Balance Soccer Complex; Attendance: 390; Referee: Carlos Fernandes

November 2, 2025	#3 UMass Lowell	0–0 (a.e.t.) (3–4 p)	#6 Bryant	Lowell, MA
16:00 EST	Maija Hodson (yellow card) 69'			Stadium: Cushing Field; Attendance: 238; Referee: Luis Reis
	Penalties
	Sophie St. George (penalty scored); Kirti Craig (penalty scored); Luka Marceau (penalty missed); Gaby Eckroth (penalty missed); Nuala Rodgers (penalty scored); Eliana Parreira (penalty missed)		(penalty scored) Jennah Quill; (penalty scored) Emily Supple; (penalty missed) Shannon Mejia; (penalty missed) Nyema Prentice-Whyte; (penalty scored) Samantha Zaslaw; (penalty scored) Madison Luke

=== Semifinals ===
November 6, 2025	#1 Binghamton	0–1 (a.e.t.)	#4 Maine	Vestal, NY
5:00 p.m. EST	Sophia Garofalo (yellow card) 100'	Box Score	106' Victoria Dungey	Stadium: Bearcats Sports Complex; Attendance: 1,255; Referee: Rob Komorowski; Assistant referees: David Bosak; TJ Jiries

November 6, 2025	#2 Vermont	3–1	#6 Bryant	Burlington, VT
6:00 p.m. EST	Lauren DeGroot 45', 53'; Sydney Remington 59'	Box Score	19' Colleen Ardolino	Stadium: Virtue Field; Attendance: 680; Referee: Carlos Fernandes; Assistant referees: Brendan Fanning; Jason Dizek; Fourth official: Jeremiah Vallieres

=== Final ===
November 9, 2025	#2 Vermont	2–2 (a.e.t.) (3–4 p)	#4 Maine	Burlington, VT
1:00 p.m. EST	Emma Warren 4'; Lauren DeGroot 19'	Box Score	29' Jordane Pinette; 53' Grace Johnson; (yellow card) 108' Gillian Rovers	Stadium: Virtue Field; Attendance: 1,036; Referee: Adam Kilpatrick; Assistant referees: Samuel Conroy; Andy Mason; Fourth official: Katie Pinkus
	Penalties
	Amelia Adiutori (penalty scored); Bridget Kennedy (penalty scored); Lauren DeGroot (penalty missed); Della Weir (penalty scored); Vanessa Smith (penalty missed)		(penalty scored) Meghan Bernetti; (penalty scored) Luise Reinwald; (penalty scored) Britta Denny; (penalty scored) Olivia Grisdale

== Statistics ==
=== Goalscorers ===
There were 12 goals scored in 5 matches, for an average of 2.4 goals per match (as of November 9, 2025).

3 goals

- Lauren DeGroot – Vermont

2 goals

- Jordane Pinette – Maine

1 goal

- Colleen Ardolino – Bryant
- Victoria Dungey – Maine
- Grace Johnson – Maine
- Gillian Rovers – Maine
- Shya Walker – New Hampshire
- Sydney Remington – Vermont
- Emma Warren – Vermont

== All-Tournament team ==
Player	Team
Anna Buckwalter	Binghamton
Allison Falvo	Binghamton
**Elena Barenberg**	Maine
Olivia Grisdale	Maine
Madison Luke	Maine
Jordane Pinette	Maine
Luise Reinwald	Maine
Emily Supple	Maine
Abbi Maier	New Hampshire
Nuala Rodgers	UMass Lowell
Kylee Carafoli	Vermont
Lauren Degroot	Vermont
Torie Snyder	Vermont

MVP in bold
