= 2025 Big South Conference women's soccer tournament =

- Classification: Division I
- Teams: 6
- Matches: 5
- Attendance: 1,145
- First round site: Longwood Athletics Complex; Vert Stadium; Farmville, Virginia; High Point, North Carolina
- Semifinals site: Sportsplex at Matthews; Matthews, North Carolina
- Finals site: Sportsplex at Matthews; Matthews, North Carolina
- Champions: High Point (8th title)
- Winning coach: Aaron McGuiness (1st title)
- MVP: Aubrey McKessy (High Point)
- Broadcast: ESPN+

2025 Big South Conference women's soccer standings
	Conf.						Overall
Team	W		L		T	PCT	W		L		T	PCT
Radford ‍†‍‍	7	–	1	–	0	.875	10	–	5	–	1	.656
USC Upstate ‍‍‍	6	–	2	–	0	.750	10	–	6	–	3	.605
Longwood ‍‍‍	5	–	3	–	0	.625	9	–	7	–	3	.553
High Point ‍‍‡‍^{y}	3	–	3	–	2	.500	5	–	10	–	5	.375
Gardner-Webb ‍‍‍	3	–	3	–	2	.500	4	–	11	–	3	.306
Charleston Southern ‍‍‍	3	–	4	–	1	.438	6	–	8	–	4	.444
Winthrop ‍‍‍	2	–	3	–	3	.438	4	–	6	–	6	.438
UNC Asheville ‍‍‍	1	–	5	–	2	.250	5	–	9	–	3	.382
Presbyterian ‍‍‍	0	–	6	–	2	.125	3	–	10	–	3	.281
† – Conference champion ‡ – 2025 Big South Tournament champion y – Invited to the NCAA Tournament; As of December 9, 2025; Rankings from United Soccer Coaches Poll; Source:Big South Conference

The 2025 Big South Conference women's soccer tournament was the postseason women's soccer tournament for the Big South Conference held from November 1 through November 9, 2025. The tournament was hosted by campus sites for the First Round and by the Sportsplex at Matthews in Matthews, North Carolina, for the Semifinals and Final. The six team-team single-elimination tournament consisted of three rounds based on seeding from regular season conference play. USC Upstate were the defending champions. The Spartans were unable to defend their crown, as they fell to Longwood in the Semifinals in a penalty shoot-out. High Point would go on to win the title over Longwood in another penalty shoot-out in the Final. The conference tournament title was the eighth for the High Point Panthers women's soccer program, and first for head coach Aaron McGuiness. As tournament champions, High Point earned the Big South's automatic berth into the 2025 NCAA Division I women's soccer tournament.

== Seeding ==
The top six teams in the regular season earned a spot in the tournament. The top two seeds earned byes into the Semifinals, and the third and fourth seeds earned the right to host a First Round match. A tiebreaker was required to determine the fourth and fifth seeds as Gardner-Webb and High Point both finished with identical 3–3–2 regular season records. High Point earned the fourth seed by virtue of their 3–0 victory over Gardner-Webb during the regular season on October 25.

Seed	School	Conference Record	Points
1	Radford	7–1–0	21
2	USC Upstate	6–2–0	18
3	Longwood	5–3–0	15
4	High Point	3–3–2	11
5	Gardner-Webb	3–3–2	11
6	Charleston Southern	3–4–1	10

== Bracket ==
First round Saturday, Nov. 1
4	High Point	3
5	Gardner-Webb	0
3	Longwood	2
6	Charleston Southern	0

Semifinals; Thursday, Nov. 6
1	Radford	1
4	High Point	2
2	USC Upstate	1 (6)
3	Longwood (pen.)	1 (5)

Final; Sunday, Nov. 9
4	High Point (pen.)	1 (7)
2	USC Upstate	1 (6)

== Schedule ==
=== First Round ===
November 1	(4) High Point	3–0	(5) Gardner-Webb	High Point, NC
4:00 p.m. EST	Bella Burr 17'; Ally Ruiz 18'; Peyton Gilmore 37'	Report		Stadium: Vert Stadium; Attendance: 468; Referee: Bill Dittmar; Assistant referees: Gavin Pilato; Jake Hagemann; Fourth official: Logan Fraley

November 1	(3) Longwood	2–0	(6) Charleston Southern	Farmville, VA
7:00 p.m. EST	Meghan Piazza 55' (pen.); Remi Siner 65'	Report		Stadium: Longwood Athletics Complex; Attendance: 263; Referee: Richard Wells; Assistant referees: Hicham El Bariqi; Joseph Carr; Fourth official: Andrea Romine

=== Semifinals ===
November 6	(1) Radford	1–2	(4) High Point	Matthews, NC
4:00 p.m. EST	Ashley Loundermon 58'	Report	32' Peyton Gilmore; 62' Morgan Wilcox	Stadium: Sportsplex at Matthews; Attendance: 1 Referee: Kevin Maurer; Assistant referees: Justin Howard; Amy Balbier; Fourth official: Ralph Polson

November 6	(2) USC Upstate	1–1 (a.e.t.) (6–5 p)	(3) Longwood	Matthews, NC
7:00 p.m. EST	Paige Armstrong 15'; Emily Rangel (yellow card) 82'	Report	60' (pen.) Coryn Silberstien; (yellow card) 77' Peyton Curney; (yellow card) 82' Sarah Olson	Stadium: Sportsplex at Matthews; Attendance: 1 Referee: John Matto; Assistant referees: Robert Dail; Luis Pineres; Fourth official: Rick Rogers
	Penalties
	Riley O'Bryan (penalty scored); Morgan de Barros (penalty scored); Savannah Noll (penalty scored); Audrey Baer (penalty scored); Morgan Nelson (penalty scored); Paige Armstrong (penalty scored)		(penalty scored) Meghan Piazza; (penalty scored) Emma Jones; (penalty scored) Coryn Silberstein; (penalty scored) Sydeny Robertson; (penalty scored) Remi Siner; (penalty missed) Claire Schultz

=== Final ===
November 9	(2) USC Upstate	1–1 (a.e.t.) (6–7 p)	(4) High Point	Matthews, NC
1:00 p.m. EST	Savannah Noll 30' (pen.)	Report	(red card) 7' Joellie Giquinto; 90' Kari Powell	Stadium: Sportsplex at Matthews; Attendance: 412; Referee: John Rush; Assistant referees: Richard Wells; Jake Hagemann; Fourth official: Clive Edwards
	Penalties
	Riley O'Bryan (penalty scored); Audrey Baer (penalty scored); Maddie Smith (penalty scored); Morgan de Barros (penalty scored); Morgan Nelson (penalty scored); Raegan Bell (penalty scored); Dara Russo (penalty missed)		(penalty scored) Ally Ruiz; (penalty scored) Thea Oberhoff; (penalty scored) Sabba Haghgoo; (penalty scored) Peyton Gilmore; (penalty scored) Kasey Resker; (penalty scored) Gianna Rizzo; (penalty scored) Ellie Hammer

== Statistics ==
=== Goalscorers ===
There were 12 goals scored in 5 matches, for an average of 2.4 goals per match (as of November 9, 2025).

2 goals

- Peyton Gilmore – High Point

1 goal

- Bella Burr – High Point
- Kari Powell – High Point
- Ally Ruiz – High Point
- Morgan Wilcox – High Point
- Meghan Piazza – Longwood
- Coryn Silberstien – Longwood
- Remi Siner – Longwood
- Ashley Loundermon – Radford
- Paige Armstrong – USC Upstate
- Savannah Noll – USC Upstate

== All-Tournament team ==
Player	Team
Jenéa Knight	Charleston Southern
Peyton Bryant	Gardner-Webb
Bella Burr	High Point
Coryn McDonnell	High Point
**Aubrey McKessy**	High Point
Kari Powell	High Point
Sara Curtis	Longwood
Sydney Robertson	Longwood
Ashley Loundermon	Radford
Paige Olson	Radford
Paige Armstrong	USC Upstate
Audrey Baer	USC Upstate
Savannah Noll	USC Upstate

MVP in bold
