= 2025 Mountain West Conference women's soccer tournament =

- Classification: Division I
- Teams: 6
- Matches: 5
- Attendance: 4,294
- Site: Boas Soccer Complex; Boise, ID
- Champions: Utah State (3rd title)
- Winning coach: Manny Martins (3rd title)
- MVP: Taylor Rath (Utah State)
- Broadcast: MountainWest Sports Network

2025 Mountain West Conference women's soccer standings
	Conf.						Overall
Team	W		L		T	PCT	W		L		T	PCT
Boise St ‍†‍‍	8	–	0	–	2	.900	10	–	3	–	8	.667
Air Force ‍‍‍	6	–	2	–	2	.700	8	–	7	–	4	.526
Utah State ‍‍‡‍^{y}	5	–	2	–	3	.650	10	–	6	–	7	.587
Colorado St ‍‍‍	4	–	2	–	4	.600	10	–	4	–	5	.658
New Mexico ‍‍‍	4	–	2	–	4	.600	9	–	4	–	7	.625
San Diego St ‍‍‍	4	–	2	–	4	.600	8	–	5	–	6	.579
Fresno St ‍‍‍	4	–	4	–	2	.500	7	–	6	–	5	.528
Grand Canyon ‍‍‍	3	–	5	–	2	.400	8	–	8	–	2	.500
Colorado College ‍‍‍	2	–	3	–	5	.450	5	–	6	–	7	.472
Wyoming ‍‍‍	2	–	4	–	4	.400	7	–	6	–	6	.526
UNLV ‍‍‍	2	–	4	–	4	.400	4	–	10	–	5	.342
Nevada ‍‍‍	1	–	8	–	1	.150	2	–	14	–	2	.167
San Jose St ‍‍‍	0	–	7	–	3	.150	1	–	14	–	3	.139
† – Conference champion ‡ – 2025 MW Tournament champion y – Invited to the NCAA Tournament; As of December 9, 2025; Rankings from United Soccer Coaches Poll; Source:Mountain West Conference

The 2025 Mountain West Conference women's soccer tournament was the postseason women's soccer tournament for the Mountain West Conference held from November 2 through November 8, 2025. The five-match tournament took place at Boas Soccer Complex in Boise, Idaho. The six-team single-elimination tournament consisted of three rounds based on seeding from regular season conference play. The Utah State Aggies were the defending champions. The Aggies successfully defended their title by defeating first seed Boise State in the Final, in a penalty shoot-out. This was the third Mountain West tournament championship for Utah State. They previously won two championships in the WAC. It was the third title for head coach Manny Martins. This is the third straight title for both Utah State and head coach Manny Martins As tournament champions, Utah State earned the Mountain West's automatic berth into the 2025 NCAA Division I women's soccer tournament.

== Seeding ==
The top six Mountain West teams from regular season play qualified for the 2025 Tournament. Teams were seeded based on their regular season records. Tiebreakers were used to determine seeds if teams were tied on regular season record. A three-way tiebreaker was required as Colorado State, New Mexico, and San Diego State all finished with 4–2–4 regular season records and sixteen conference points. The tiebreaker was determine by head-to-head records between the tied teams. San Diego State drew at Colorado State and won versus New Mexico During the regular season. Colorado State and New Mexico did not play during the regular season. Therefore, San Diego State earned the fourth seed with four points from games against tied opponents, Colorado State was the fifth seed with one point, and New Mexico was the sixth seed with zero points.

Seed	School	Conference Record	Points
1	Boise State	8–0–2	26
2	Air Force	6–2–2	20
3	Utah State	5–2–3	18
4	San Diego State	4–2–4	16
5	Colorado State	4–2–4	16
6	New Mexico	4–2–4	16

== Bracket ==
First Round; Sunday, Nov. 2
4	San Diego State	1
5	Colorado State	0
3	Utah State	1
6	New Mexico	0

Semifinals; Wednesday, Nov. 5
1	Boise State (pen.)	1 (3)
4	San Diego State	1 (2)
2	Air Force	0
3	Utah State (a.e.t.)	1

Final; Saturday, Nov. 8
1	Boise State	2 (2)
3	Utah State (pen.)	2 (4)

== Schedule ==
=== First round ===
November 2	(3) Utah State	1–0	(6) New Mexico	Boise, ID
4:00 p.m. MST	Kunie Hirai 71'	Report		Stadium: Boas Soccer Complex; Attendance: 402; Referee: Nathan Max; Assistant referees: Brian Weiss; Ryan Elsberry; Fourth official: Alexander Jones

November 2	(4) San Diego State	1–0	(5) Colorado State	Boise, ID
7:00 p.m. MST	Mia Hambro Svendsen 84'; Kailey Carlen (yellow card) 87'	Report		Stadium: Boas Soccer Complex; Attendance: 396; Referee: Riley Jones; Assistant referees: Trey Dohman; Alex Calderon; Fourth official: Hannah Steiner

=== Semifinals ===
November 5	(2) Air Force	0–1 (a.e.t.)	(3) Utah State	Boise, ID
4:00 p.m. MST		Report	(yellow card) 37' Capriel Winder; (yellow card) 65' Kaylie Chambers; 97' Rachel Reitz	Stadium: Boas Soccer Complex; Attendance: 693; Referee: Kelsey Harms; Assistant referees: James Meade; Alexander Jones; Fourth official: Brian Weiss

November 5	(1) Boise State	1–1 (a.e.t.) (3–2 p)	(4) San Diego State	Boise, ID
7:00 p.m. MST	Jillian Anderson 67'; Kaylee McKeehan (yellow card) 102'; Teryn Newkirk (yellow card) 109'	Report	(yellow card) 18' Mia Hambro Svendsen; 51' Mia Lane	Stadium: Boas Soccer Complex; Attendance: 907; Referee: Serghei Celan; Assistant referees: Selvedin Mutafic; Kent Wang; Fourth official: Brian Weiss
	Penalties
	Cindy Conner (penalty scored); Kenzie MacMillan (penalty missed); Madie Donovan (penalty scored); Olivia Collins (penalty scored)		(penalty scored) Katie Senn; (penalty missed) Mia Lane; (penalty missed) Lily Boudet; (penalty scored) Alexis Leath; (penalty missed) Grace Goins

=== Final ===
November 8	(1) Boise State	2–2 (a.e.t.) (2–4 p)	(3) Utah State	Boise, ID
6:00 p.m. MST	Cindy Conner (yellow card) 48'; Kaylee McKeehan (yellow card) 57'; Olivia Collins 75' (pen.); Kayla Soderstrom 80'	Report	(yellow card) 48' Tess Werts; 49' Summer Diamond; 64' (pen.) Rine Yonaha; (yellow card) 79' Rachel Reitz	Stadium: Boas Soccer Complex; Attendance: 1,896; Referee: Bradley Miller; Assistant referees: Daniel Sanchez; Matthew Sanchez; Fourth official: Riley Jones
	Penalties
	Olivia Collins (penalty scored); Jillian Anderson (penalty missed); Madie Donovan (penalty scored); Cindy Conner (penalty missed)		(penalty scored) Rine Yonaha; (penalty scored) Rachel Reitz; (penalty scored) Talia Winder; (penalty scored) Kaylie Chambers

== Statistics ==
=== Goalscorers ===
There were 9 goals scored in 5 matches, for an average of 1.8 goals per match (as of November 8, 2025).

1 goal

- Jillian Anderson – Boise State
- Olivia Collins – Boise State
- Kayla Soderstrom – Boise State
- Mia Lane – San Diego State
- Mia Hambro Svendsen – San Diego State
- Summer Diamond – Utah State
- Kunie Hirai – Utah State
- Rachel Reitz – Utah State
- Rine Yonaha – Utah State

== All-Tournament team ==
Position	Player	Team
Goalkeeper	Sydney Nelms	Air Force
Goalkeeper	Kailey Carlen	San Diego State
Goalkeeper	**Taylor Rath**	Utah State
Defender	Ava Carpentier	Air Force
Defender	Ali Chatterton	Boise State
Defender	Grace Goins	San Diego State
Midfielder	Maddie Donovan	Boise State
Midfielder	Kayla Soderstrom	Boise State
Midfielder	Kayle Chambers	Utah State
Midfielder	Summer Diamond	Utah State
Midfielder	Rine Yonaha	Utah State

MVP in bold
