= 2025 Patriot League women's soccer tournament =

Postseason women's soccer tournament for the Patriot League

- Classification: Division I
- Teams: 6
- Matches: 5
- Attendance: 3,251
- Site: Campus Sites, Higher seed
- Champions: Army West Point (4th title)
- Winning coach: Tracy Chao (1st title)
- MVP: Sabrina Rogers (Army West Point)
- Broadcast: ESPN+ (First Round & Semifinals); CBS Sports Network (Final)

2025 Patriot League women's soccer standings
	Conf.						Overall
Team	W		L		T	PCT	W		L		T	PCT
Boston U ‍†‍‍	7	–	1	–	1	.833	11	–	5	–	3	.658
Colgate ‍‍‍	6	–	2	–	1	.722	9	–	6	–	4	.579
Army West Point ‍‍‡‍^{y}	5	–	3	–	1	.611	14	–	6	–	2	.682
Holy Cross ‍‍‍	3	–	3	–	3	.500	6	–	7	–	6	.474
Lafayette ‍‍‍	3	–	3	–	3	.500	5	–	8	–	7	.425
Loyola (MD) ‍‍‍	2	–	2	–	5	.500	5	–	5	–	8	.500
Navy ‍‍‍	2	–	3	–	4	.444	9	–	6	–	4	.579
American ‍‍‍	3	–	5	–	1	.389	3	–	10	–	4	.294
Bucknell ‍‍‍	1	–	4	–	4	.333	3	–	9	–	6	.333
Lehigh ‍‍‍	1	–	7	–	1	.167	3	–	11	–	3	.265
† – Conference champion ‡ – 2025 Patriot League Tournament champion y – Invited to the NCAA Tournament; As of December 9, 2025; Rankings from United Soccer Coaches Poll; Source:Patriot League

The 2025 Patriot League women's soccer tournament was the postseason women's soccer tournament for the Patriot League held from November 2 through November 9, 2025. The tournament was held at campus sites, with the higher seeded team hosting. The six-team single-elimination tournament consisted of three rounds based on seeding from regular season conference play. The defending champions were the Boston University Terriers. Boston University entered the tournament as the first seed and qualified for the Final. However, they were unable to defend their title as the fell to third seed Army West Point 3–2 in the final. The conference championship was the fourth for the Army women's soccer program, and first for head coach Tracy Chao. As tournament champions, Army West Point earned the Patriot League's automatic berth into the 2025 NCAA Division I women's soccer tournament.

== Seeding ==
Seeding was based on regular season play with the top six teams qualifying for the tournament. The top two seeds received a bye to the Semifinals of the tournament and the higher seed hosted each match. A tiebreaker was required to determine the fourth and fifth seeds for the tournament as both Holy Cross and Lafayette finished with identical 3–3–3 records and twelve regular season conference points. Holy Cross won the regular season meeting of the two teams 1–0 at home on October 11. Therefore, Holy Cross was the fourth seed and Lafayette was the fifth seed.

Seed	School	Conference Record	Points
1	Boston University	7–1–1	22
2	Colgate	6–2–1	19
3	Army West Point	5–3–1	16
4	Holy Cross	3–3–3	12
5	Lafayette	3–3–3	12
6	Loyola (MD)	2–2–5	11

== Bracket ==
Quarterfinals; Sunday, Nov. 2
4	Holy Cross	2 (2)
5	Lafayette (pen.)	2 (4)
3	Army West Point	3
6	Loyola (MD)	1

Semifinals; Thursday, Nov. 6
1	Boston University	4
5	Lafayette	0
2	Colgate	1
3	Army West Point	2

Final; Sunday, Nov. 9
1	Boston University	2
3	Army West Point	3

== Schedule ==
=== Quarterfinals ===
November 2	(3) Army West Point	3–1	(6) Loyola (MD)	West Point, NY
1:00 p.m. EST	Sabrina Rogers 10'; Maddi Woodward 48'; Brigid Duffy 57'	Report	(yellow card) 23' Bridgi McElderry; 63' Savannah Manset; (yellow card) 79' Asma Merzougui	Stadium: Malek Stadium; Attendance: 1,254; Referee: Joseph Poremba; Assistant referees: George Frascione; Kyle O'Grady; Fourth official: David Bork

November 2	(4) Holy Cross	2–2 (a.e.t.) (2–4 p)	(5) Lafayette	Worcester, MA
1:00 p.m. EST	Sam Halligan 13', (yellow card) 86'; Karenna Beckstein 42' (pen.); Abigail Cushing (yellow card) 95'	Report	63', 80' Nadia Zaffanella; (yellow card) 80' Katrina Santelli	Stadium: Linda Johnson Smith Soccer Stadium; Attendance: 459; Referee: Moulay Ridaoui; Assistant referees: Syrus Ataii; Steven Cardoso; Fourth official: Augusto St. Silva
	Penalties
	Antriana Mila (penalty scored); Abigail Cushing (penalty missed); Alessia Cerulo (penalty scored); Sam Halligan (penalty missed)		(penalty scored) April McDonald; (penalty scored) Nadia Zaffanella; (penalty scored) Era Methoxha; (penalty scored) Jessica Giordanella

=== Semifinals ===
November 6	(1) Boston University	4–0	(5) Lafayette	Boston, MA
6:00 p.m. EST	Ava Maguire 56', 71'; Margy Porta 68'; Juliana Osterman 87'	Report		Stadium: Nickerson Field; Attendance: 273; Referee: Jose Mendes; Assistant referees: Jill Canelli; Michele Beagan; Fourth official: Augusto St. Silva

November 6	(2) Colgate	1–2	(3) Army West Point	Hamilton, NY
6:00 p.m. EST	Ari Bezanson 90'	Report	44' Sophia Henry; 88' Brigid Duffy	Stadium: Beyer-Small Field; Attendance: 728; Referee: Ankur Singh; Assistant referees: Stephanie Serrano; Michael Bloom; Fourth official: Jason Weischedel

=== Final ===
November 9	(1) Boston University	2–3	(3) Army West Point	Boston, MA
12:00 p.m. EST	Ava Maguire 58'; Team (yellow card) 63'; Olivia Avellar 83'	Report	4', 83' Sabrina Rogers; 38' Sophia Henry	Stadium: Nickerson Field; Attendance: 537; Referee: Dianna Kolodziey; Assistant referees: Elizabeth McDonald; Julianna Roa; Fourth official: Erin Polselli

== Statistics ==
=== Goalscorers ===
There were 20 goals scored in 5 matches, for an average of 4 goals per match (as of November 9, 2025).

3 goals

- Ava Maguire – Boston University

2 goals

- Brigid Duffy – Army West Point
- Sophia Henry – Army West Point
- Sabrina Rogers – Army West Point
- Nadia Zaffanella – Lafayette

1 goal

- Sabrina Rogers – Army West Point
- Maddi Woodward – Army West Point
- Olivia Avellar – Boston University
- Juliana Osterman – Boston University
- Margy Porta – Boston University
- Ari Bezanson – Colgate
- Karenna Beckstein – Holy Cross
- Sam Halligan – Holy Cross
- Savannah Manset – Loyola (MD)

== All-Tournament team ==
Player	Team
Brigid Duffy	Army West Point
Jordan Follenweider	Army West Point
Sophia Henry	Army West Point
**Sabrina Rogers**	Army West Point
Olivia Avellar	Boston University
Giulianna Gianino	Boston University
Ava Maguire	Boston University
Ari Bezanson	Colgate
Josie Tunney	Colgate
April McDonald	Lafayette
Nadia Zaffanella	Lafayette

MVP in bold
