= 2025 Atlantic 10 Conference women's soccer tournament =

American college soccer tournament

- Classification: Division I
- Teams: 8
- Matches: 7
- Attendance: 3,440
- Site: Campus sites, higher seed
- Champions: Dayton (11th title)
- Winning coach: Eric Golz (1st title)
- MVP: Batoul Reda (Dayton)
- Broadcast: ESPN+

2025 Atlantic 10 Conference women's soccer standings
| | Conf. | | | | | | Overall |
| Team | W | | L | | T | PCT | W | | L | | T | PCT |
|---|---|---|---|---|---|---|---|---|---|---|---|---|
| Dayton ‍†‍‡‍^{y} | 10 | – | 0 | – | 0 | 1.000 | 15 | – | 4 | – | 3 | .750 |
| Saint Louis ‍‍‍ | 8 | – | 1 | – | 1 | .850 | 14 | – | 4 | – | 2 | .750 |
| Duquesne ‍‍‍ | 7 | – | 3 | – | 0 | .700 | 12 | – | 5 | – | 2 | .684 |
| Rhode Island ‍‍‍ | 5 | – | 3 | – | 2 | .600 | 13 | – | 5 | – | 3 | .690 |
| Loyola-Chicago ‍‍‍ | 4 | – | 2 | – | 4 | .600 | 9 | – | 4 | – | 6 | .632 |
| Fordham ‍‍‍ | 5 | – | 4 | – | 1 | .550 | 10 | – | 7 | – | 3 | .575 |
| VCU ‍‍‍ | 5 | – | 4 | – | 1 | .550 | 7 | – | 10 | – | 3 | .425 |
| LaSalle ‍‍‍ | 4 | – | 4 | – | 2 | .500 | 7 | – | 8 | – | 3 | .472 |
| Davidson ‍‍‍ | 3 | – | 5 | – | 2 | .400 | 7 | – | 7 | – | 3 | .500 |
| George Mason ‍‍‍ | 3 | – | 5 | – | 2 | .400 | 4 | – | 10 | – | 4 | .333 |
| Saint Joseph's ‍‍‍ | 2 | – | 6 | – | 2 | .300 | 5 | – | 10 | – | 3 | .361 |
| Richmond ‍‍‍ | 1 | – | 5 | – | 4 | .300 | 4 | – | 7 | – | 7 | .417 |
| George Washington ‍‍‍ | 2 | – | 7 | – | 1 | .250 | 5 | – | 9 | – | 4 | .389 |
| St. Bonaventure ‍‍‍ | 0 | – | 10 | – | 0 | .000 | 3 | – | 13 | – | 2 | .222 |
† – Conference champion ‡ – 2025 Atlantic 10 Tournament champion y – Invited to the NCAA Tournament; As of December 9, 2025; Rankings from United Soccer Coaches Poll; Source:A10 Conference

The 2025 Atlantic 10 Conference women's soccer tournament was the postseason women's soccer tournament for the Atlantic 10 Conference held from October 31 through November 9, 2025. All matches took place at on the campus of the higher seeded team. The eight-team single-elimination tournament consisted of three rounds based on seeding from regular season conference play. The defending tournament champions were the Saint Louis Billikens. The Billikens were unable to defend their title for an eighth straight time as they fell in the Semifinals to Rhode Island. Dayton defeated Rhode Island in the Final in a penalty shoot-out to earn the title. This was the Flyer's eleventh overall title and first since 2016. It was the first title for ninth-year head coach Eric Golz. As tournament champions, Dayton earned the Atlantic 10's automatic berth into the 2025 NCAA Division I women's soccer tournament.

== Seeding ==
The top eight teams in regular season play qualified for the tournament. Teams were seeded based on regular season conference records. A three-team tiebreaker was required between Fordham, Loyola-Chicago, and VCU as all three teams finished with sixteen conference points. All three teams did not play each other during the regular season, so records against common conference opponents was used. VCU earned the fifth seed, while Fordam was the sixth seed, which left Loyola-Chicago as the seventh seed.

| Seed | School | Conference Record | Points |
|---|---|---|---|
| 1 | Dayton | 10–0–0 | 30 |
| 2 | Saint Louis | 8–1–1 | 25 |
| 3 | Duquesne | 7–3–0 | 21 |
| 4 | Rhode Island | 5–3–2 | 17 |
| 5 | VCU | 5–4–1 | 16 |
| 6 | Fordham | 5–4–1 | 16 |
| 7 | Loyola-Chicago | 4–2–4 | 16 |
| 8 | La Salle | 4–4–2 | 14 |

== Bracket ==
Quarterfinals; Friday, October 31; Saturday, November 1
1 | Dayton | 3
8 | La Salle | 1
4 | Rhode Island | 2
5 | VCU | 1
(Pairings are reseeded after the first round)
2 | Saint Louis | 6
7 | Loyola-Chicago | 0
3 | Duquesne | 1 (5)
6 | Fordham (pen.) | 1 (6)

Semifinals; Wednesday, November 5
1 | Dayton | 1
6 | Fordham | 0
2 | Saint Louis | 2
4 | Rhode Island | 4

Final; Sunday, November 9
1 | Dayton (pen.) | 0 (5)
4 | Rhode Island | 0 (4)

== Schedule ==
=== Quarterfinals ===
| October 31 | (1) Dayton | 3–1 | (8) La Salle | Dayton, OH |
| 7:00 p.m. EDT | Liv Grenda 36'; Olivia Baca 68'; Laney Smith 78' | Report | 15' (pen.) Justyce Hollenbach; (yellow card) 21' Jillian Drumm; (yellow card) 21' (yellow-red card) 21' Team; (yellow card) 50' Brianna Lewis; (yellow card) 62' Jaci Gismondi | Stadium: Baujan Field; Attendance: 327; Referee: Hilario Grajeda; Assistant referees: Cory Boyes; Corey Artim; Fourth official: Samuel Cogen |

| October 31 | (4) Rhode Island | 2–1 | (5) VCU | Kingston, RI |
| 7:00 p.m. EDT | Lauren MacDonald 34'; Sarah Yee 37' | Report | 58' Keira McCloskey | Stadium: URI Soccer Complex; Attendance: 251; Referee: Adam Kilpatrick; Assistant referees: Kyle Averill; Alex Rusu; Fourth official: Katherine Mitchell |

| November 1 | (2) Saint Louis | 6–0 | (7) Loyola-Chicago | St. Louis, MO |
| 2:00 p.m. CDT | Ashley Miller 7'; Julia Simon 13' (pen.); Blakely Hockett (yellow card) 15'; Audrey Smith 23'; Adee Broesder 62'; Rylee Howard 83'; Emily Fox 83' | Report | | Stadium: Hermann Stadium; Attendance: 472; Referee: Aaron Rawlins; Assistant referees: Michael Heath; Jeff Pulley; Fourth official: Velimir Milovic |

| November 1 | (3) Duquesne | 1–1 (a.e.t.) (5–6 p) | (6) Fordham | Pittsburgh, PA |
| 2:30 p.m. EDT | Paige Kuisis 41'; Team (yellow card) 76' | Report | 5' Riley Carroll | Stadium: Rooney Field; Attendance: 424; Referee: Ali Zolgharnain; Assistant referees: Ross Kleinstuber; Taylor Bombalski; Fourth official: Deniz Muhittinoglu |
| | Penalties |
| | Maya Matesa (penalty scored); Brianna Moore (penalty scored); Jayden Sharpless (penalty scored); Mackenzie Muir (penalty scored); Cait Mackey (penalty scored); Kaitlyn Killinger (penalty missed) | | (penalty scored) Liina Tervo; (penalty scored) Salma Simonin; (penalty scored) Ava Giudice; (penalty scored) Sarah Quinn; (penalty scored) Lucy Rios; (penalty scored) Juila Acosta |

=== Semifinals ===
| November 5 | (1) Dayton | 1–0 | (6) Fordham | Dayton, OH |
| 7:00 p.m. EST | Kyra Karfonta 9' (pen.); Karli Ferguson (yellow card) 82' | Report | (yellow card) 48' Olivia Vricella | Stadium: Baujan Field; Attendance: 689; Referee: Alex Tensi; Assistant referees: Donald Williams; John Thiel; Fourth official: Gary Lucking |

| November 5 | (2) Saint Louis | 2–4 | (4) Rhode Island | St. Louis, MO |
| 7:00 p.m. CST | Hannah Larson 11'; Julia Simon 63' | Report | 40' Jill Rosenfeld; 54', 76' Lauren MacDonald; 63' Julia Simon | Stadium: Hermann Stadium; Attendance: 705; Referee: William DeLois; Assistant referees: Matthew Stein; Colin Pressy; Fourth official: Joseph Heyden |

=== Final ===
| November 9 | (1) Dayton | 0–0 (a.e.t.) (5–4 p) | (4) Rhode Island | Dayton, OH |
| Noon EST | | Report | (yellow card) 103' Natalie White; (red card) 109' Team | Stadium: Baujan Field; Attendance: 572; Referee: Calin Radosav; Assistant referees: Josh Braunstein; Joey DiOrio; Fourth official: Brandon Klepach |
| | Penalties |
| | Kyra Karfonta (penalty scored); Lauryn Contini (penalty scored); Emery Aschenbrener (penalty missed); Olivia Baca (penalty scored); Laney Smith (penalty scored); Riley Kerber (penalty scored) | | (penalty scored) Kaia Rice; (penalty scored) Courtney Poon; (penalty missed) Lauren MacDonald; (penalty scored) McKenna Sylvester; (penalty scored) Mie Carstensen; (penalty missed) Cierra Penny |

== Statistics ==
=== Goalscorers ===
There were 22 goals scored in 7 matches, for an average of 3.14 goals per match (as of November 9, 2025).

3 goals

- Lauren MacDonald – Rhode Island

2 goals

- Julia Simon – Saint Louis

1 goal

- Olivia Baca – Dayton
- Kyra Karfonta – Dayton
- Liv Grenda – Dayton
- Laney Smith – Dayton
- Paige Kuisis – Duquesne
- Riley Carroll – Fordham
- Justyce Hollenbach – La Salle
- Jill Rosenfeld – Rhode Island
- Julia Simon – Rhode Island
- Sarah Yee – Rhode Island
- Adee Broesder – Saint Louis
- Emily Fox – Saint Louis
- Blakely Hockett – Saint Louis
- Rylee Howard – Saint Louis
- Hannah Larson – Saint Louis
- Ashley Miller – Saint Louis
- Keira McCloskey – VCU

== All Tournament Team ==
| Player | Team |
|---|---|
**2025 A10 Women's Soccer All-Tournament team**
| Liv Grenda | Dayton |
| Kyra Karfonta | Dayton |
| Riley Kerber | Dayton |
| **Batoul Reda** | Dayton |
| Riley Carroll | Fordham |
| Dani Eden | Rhode Island |
| Lauren McDonald | Rhode Island |
| Aida Name | Rhode Island |
| McKenna Sylvester | Rhode Island |
| Hannah Larson | Saint Louis |
| Julia Simon | Saint Louis |

MVP in bold
