= 2025 SWAC women's soccer tournament =

- Classification: Division I
- Teams: 8
- Matches: 7
- Attendance: 1,385
- Site: PVA&M Soccer Stadium; Prairie View, Texas
- Champions: Grambling State (4th title)
- Winning coach: Justin Wagar (2nd title)
- MVP: Liana Bryant (Grambling State)
- Broadcast: SWAC Digital Network

2025 SWAC women's soccer standings
	Conf.						Overall
Team	W		L		T	PCT	W		L		T	PCT
Grambling State ‍‍‡‍^{y}	5	–	0	–	3	.813	11	–	7	–	5	.587
Jackson State ‍†‍‍	6	–	1	–	1	.813	9	–	7	–	3	.553
Alabama A&M ‍‍‍	5	–	2	–	1	.688	9	–	8	–	1	.528
Texas Southern ‍‍‍	5	–	2	–	1	.688	8	–	7	–	4	.526
Prairie View A&M ‍‍‍	4	–	3	–	1	.563	5	–	10	–	2	.353
Alcorn State ‍‍‍	3	–	3	–	2	.500	4	–	8	–	4	.375
Southern ‍‍‍	2	–	5	–	1	.313	3	–	11	–	1	.233
Alabama State ‍‍‍	1	–	7	–	0	.125	2	–	16	–	1	.132
UAPB ‍‍‍	0	–	8	–	0	.000	1	–	13	–	0	.071
Mississippi Valley State ‍‍‍	0	–	0	–	0	–	0	–	3	–	0	.000
† – Conference champion ‡ – 2025 SWAC Tournament champion y – Invited to the NCAA Tournament; As of December 9, 2025; Rankings from United Soccer Coaches Poll; Source: SWAC

The 2025 SWAC women's soccer tournament was the postseason women's soccer tournament for the Southwestern Athletic Conference held November 6–9, 2025. The seven-match tournament took place at the Prairie View A&M Soccer Stadium in Prairie View, Texas. The eight-team single-elimination tournament consisted of three rounds based on seeding from regular season conference play. The defending champions were the guars women's soccer|Southern, however they were unable to defend their title, as they were defeated by Grambling State in the Quarterfinals. Grambling State would go on to defeat top-seed Jackson State 2–1 in the Final. The conference tournament title was the fourth for the Grambling State women's soccer program, and second for head coach Justin Wagar. As tournament champions, Grambling State earned the SWAC's automatic berth into the 2025 NCAA Division I women's soccer tournament.

== Seeding ==
Eight of the nine teams that compete in women's soccer in the SWAC qualified for the 2025 Tournament. There were only nine teams in this season due to Mississippi Valley State cancelling its season due to "unforeseen health and safety concerns within the program". Seeding was based on regular season conference play. A tiebreaker was required between Alabama A&M and Texas Southern for the third and fourth seeds after both teams finished with identical 5–2–1 regular season records. Texas Southern won the regular season meeting between the two teams 1–0 on October 10, in Alabama. Therefore, Texas Southern earned the third seed, while Alabama A&M was the fourth seed.

Seed	School	Conference Record	Points
1	Jackson State	6–1–1	19
2	Grambling State	5–0–3	18
3	Texas Southern	5–2–1	16
4	Alabama A&M	5–2–1	16
5	Prairie View A&M	4–3–1	13
6	Alcorn State	3–3–2	11
7	Southern	2–5–1	7
8	Alabama State	1–7–0	3

== Bracket ==
Quarterfinals; Thursday, Nov. 6
1	Jackson State	4
8	Alabama State	0
4	Alabama A&M	1
5	Prairie View A&M	0
2	Grambling State	1
7	Southern	0
3	Texas Southern	1
6	Alcorn State	2

Semifinals; Friday, Nov. 7
1	Jackson State	2
4	Alabama A&M	0
2	Grambling State	6
6	Alcorn State	0

Final; Sunday, Nov. 9
1	Jackson State	1
2	Grambling State	2

== Schedule ==
=== Quarterfinals ===
November 6	(1) Jackson State	4–0	(8) Alabama State	Prairie View, TX
10:00 a.m. CST	Caylah Williams 44', 67'; Zaniyah Gonzague 47'; Sarah Portis (yellow card) 52'; Josetiarainnah Olaco 70'; Jaelyn Greer (yellow card) 71'	Report	(yellow card) 52' Emmanuella Yapi	Stadium: PVA&M Soccer Stadium; Attendance: 145; Referee: Lawerence Hale; Assistant referees: Musa Hatungimana; Ava Flores; Fourth official: Alfred Wims

November 6	(4) Alabama A&M	1–0	(5) Prairie View A&M	Prairie View, TX
1:00 p.m. CST	Czaske Deane 47'	Report		Stadium: PVA&M Soccer Stadium; Attendance: 265; Referee: Wes Caouette; Assistant referees: Alfred Wims; Sean Caouette; Fourth official: Santiago Roa

November 6	(2) Grambling State	1–0	(7) Southern	Prairie View, TX
4:00 p.m. CST	Adalie Hernandez 81'	Report	(yellow card) 22' Dayla Henderson; (yellow card) 51' Marcella De Freitas; (yellow card) 54' Janiah Bolden	Stadium: PVA&M Soccer Stadium; Attendance: 180; Referee: Jeremy Fotenot; Assistant referees: Sheneaka Wright; Gian McCain

November 6	(3) Texas Southern	1–2	(6) Alcorn State	Prairie View, TX
7:00 p.m. CST	Kamara Bradley 33'	Report	62', 74' Ainara Aldeano	Stadium: PVA&M Soccer Stadium; Attendance: 320; Referee: Alfred Wims; Assistant referees: Lawerence Hale; Wes Caouette; Fourth official: Frank Huber

=== Semifinals ===
November 7	(1) Jackson State	2–0	(4) Alabama A&M	Prairie View, TX
3:00 p.m. CST	Ryanne Hawthorn-Harper 3', 89'	Report	(yellow card) 53' Malini Baker; (yellow card) 57' Albany Rios; (yellow card) 80' Brea Bailey	Stadium: PVA&M Soccer Stadium; Attendance: 150; Referee: Dan Benson; Assistant referees: Lawrence Hale; Bo Wims; Fourth official: Wes Caouette

November 7	(2) Grambling State	6–0	(6) Alcorn State	Prairie View, TX
6:00 p.m. CST	Alana Aiken 17', (yellow card) 35'; Liana Bryant 28', 31'; Sophia Lezizidis 51' (pen.), 57'; Adalie Hernandez 58'	Report	(yellow card) 76' Elive Larissa Joso Luma; (yellow card) 78' Valentina Bernal	Stadium: PVA&M Soccer Stadium; Attendance: 150

=== Final ===
November 9	(1) Jackson State	1–2	(2) Grambling State	Prairie View, TX
1:00 p.m. CST	Alayla Jackson (yellow card) 18'; Kaila Tablado 86'	Report	(yellow card) 10' Alana Aiken; 15' Liana Bryant; 68' Chloe Bryant	Stadium: PVA&M Soccer Stadium; Attendance: 175; Referee: Wes Caouette; Assistant referees: Alfred Wims; Aya Flores; Fourth official: Sean Caouette

== Statistics ==
=== Goalscorers ===
There were 20 goals scored in 7 matches, for an average of 2.86 goals per match (as of November 9, 2025).

3 goals

- Liana Bryant – Grambling State

2 goals

- Ainara Aldeano – Alcorn State
- Adalie Hernandez – Grambling State
- Sophia Lezizidis – Grambling State
- Ryanne Hawthorn-Harper – Jackson State
- Caylah Williams – Jackson State

1 goal

- Czaske Deane – Alabama A&M
- Alana Aiken – Grambling State
- Chloe Bryant – Grambling State
- Zaniyah Gonzague – Jackson State
- Josetiarainnah Olaco – Jackson State
- Kaila Tablado – Jackson State
- Kamara Bradley – Texas Southern

== All-Tournament team ==
Player	Team
Czaske Deane	Alabama A&M
Ainara Aldeano	Alcorn State
Annick Zouma	Alcorn State
Ryanne Hawthorn-Harper	Jackson State
Sarah Portis	Jackson State
Caylah Williams	Jackson State
Alana Aiken	Grambling State
Kaia Bace	Grambling State
**Liana Bryant**	Grambling State
Adalie Hernandez	Grambling State
Sophia Lezizidis	Grambling State

MVP in bold
