= 2025 Missouri Valley Conference women's soccer tournament =

- Classification: Division I
- Teams: 6
- Matches: 5
- Attendance: 1,330
- Site: Campus Sites, hosted by Higher Seed
- Champions: UIC (1st title)
- Winning coach: David Nikolic (1st title)
- MVP: Sara Sanabria (UIC)
- Broadcast: ESPN+

2025 Missouri Valley Conference women's soccer standings
	Conf.						Overall
Team	W		L		T	PCT	W		L		T	PCT
Drake ‍†‍‍	6	–	2	–	1	.722	9	–	6	–	4	.579
Murray State ‍‍‍	5	–	1	–	3	.722	10	–	4	–	5	.658
Indiana State ‍‍‍	4	–	2	–	3	.611	8	–	6	–	6	.550
Illinois State ‍‍‍	4	–	2	–	4	.600	8	–	6	–	8	.545
Southern Illinois ‍‍‍	4	–	5	–	1	.450	10	–	6	–	3	.605
UIC ‍‍‡‍^{y}	3	–	3	–	3	.500	8	–	8	–	6	.500
Evansville ‍‍‍	3	–	5	–	1	.389	7	–	7	–	2	.500
Belmont ‍‍‍	2	–	4	–	3	.389	4	–	6	–	7	.441
Valparaiso ‍‍‍	2	–	4	–	3	.389	5	–	8	–	4	.412
UNI ‍‍‍	1	–	6	–	2	.222	4	–	9	–	3	.344
† – Conference champion ‡ – 2025 Missouri Valley Tournament champion y – Invited to the NCAA Tournament; As of December 9, 2025; Rankings from United Soccer Coaches Poll; Source:Missouri Valley Conference

The 2025 Missouri Valley Conference women's soccer tournament was the postseason women's soccer tournament for the Missouri Valley Conference held from November 2 through November 9, 2025. The tournament was hosted at campus sites, with the higher seed hosting each game. The six-team single-elimination tournament consisted of three rounds based on seeding from regular season conference play. The defending champions were the Missouri State Bears, who were unsuccessful in defending their crown as they moved to CUSA during the offseason. The sixth-seeded UIC Flames would go on to win the tournament in a penalty shoot-out over Illinois State. The conference tournament title was the first for the UIC women's soccer program, and first Missouri Valley title for head coach David Nikolic. As tournament champions, UIC earned the Missouri Valley's automatic berth into the 2025 NCAA Division I women's soccer tournament.

== Seeding ==
The top six of the ten Missouri Valley Conference women's soccer programs qualified for the 2025 Tournament. Teams were seeded based on their regular season records. A tiebreaker was required to determine the fourth and fifth seeds as Illinois State and Southern Illinois both finished with thirteen regular season conference points. Illinois State earned the fourth seed by virtue of their 2–0 home win over Southern Illinois on September 28 during the regular season.

Seed	School	Conference Record	Points
1	Drake	6–2–1	19
2	Murray State	5–1–3	18
3	Indiana State	4–2–3	15
4	Illinois State	3–2–4	13
5	Southern Illinois	4–4–1	13
6	UIC	3–3–3	12

== Bracket ==
Quarterfinals; Sunday, Nov. 2
4	Illinois State (a.e.t.)	2
5	Southern Illinois	1
3	Indiana State	1
6	UIC	2

Semifinals; Thursday, Nov. 6
1	Drake	0
4	Illinois State	1
2	Murray State	1 (3)
6	UIC (pen.)	1 (4)

Final; Sunday, Nov. 9
4	Illinois State	0 (1)
6	UIC (pen.)	0 (2)

== Schedule ==
=== Quarterfinals ===
November 2	(3) Indiana State	1–2	(6) UIC	Terre Haute, IN
12:00 p.m. CST	Tori Angelo 54'	Report	64' Katelyn Nardulli; 69' Hannah Gryzik; (yellow card) 90' Julia Thomson	Stadium: Memorial Stadium; Attendance: 276

November 2	(4) Illinois State	2–1 (a.e.t.)	(5) Southern Illinois	Normal, IL
1:00 p.m. CST	Chloe Cline 59', (yellow card) 69', 93'	Report	35' Sophia Schlicklin; (red card) 59' Lily Murray; (yellow card) 69' Team	Stadium: Adelaide Street Field; Attendance: 315

=== Semifinals ===
November 6	(2) Murray State	1–1 (a.e.t.) (3–4 p)	(6) UIC	Murray, KY
1:00 p.m. CST	Mary Hardy 31'; Kate Donoghue (yellow card) 86'	Report	86' (pen.) Kaysey Castro	Stadium: Cutchin Field; Attendance: 397; Referee: Eulogio Villalpando; Assistant referees: Adam Herges; Lucas Cross; Fourth official: Mandy Love
	Penalties
	Mary Hardy (penalty missed); Ava Wilson (penalty missed); Breece Bass (penalty scored); Megan Wilson (penalty scored); Kate Donoghue (penalty scored); Sami Wilson (penalty missed)		(penalty scored) Hannah Gryzik; (penalty scored) Camryn Ries; (penalty missed) Kaysey Castro; (penalty scored) Sophia Jaime; (penalty missed) Addison Carriere; (penalty scored) Katelyn Nardulli

November 6	(1) Drake	0–1	(4) Illinois State	Des Moines, IA
3:00 p.m. CST	Layla Kelbel (yellow card) 61'; Team (yellow card) 72'	Report	85' (pen.) Abby Hall	Stadium: Mediacom Stadium; Attendance: 342; Referee: Eulogio Villalpando; Assistant referees: Sean Giza; Vasilios Vouris; Fourth official: Christian Vouris

=== Final ===
November 9	(4) Illinois State	0–0 (a.e.t.) (1–2 p)	(6) UIC	Normal, IL
1:00 p.m. CST	Abby Hall (yellow card) 104'	Report		Stadium: Adelaide Street Field; Referee: Nikola Aleksic; Assistant referees: Adrian Werbicki; Shane Richards; Fourth official: Michele Waldbeesser
	Penalties
	Eve Gricius (penalty missed); Elyse Deschryver (penalty scored); Abby Hall (penalty missed); Madi Valenti (penalty missed); Jade Rehberger (penalty missed)		(penalty scored) Hannah Gryzik; (penalty missed) Sophia Jaime; (penalty scored) Kaysey Castro; (penalty missed) Camryn Ries

== Statistics ==
=== Goalscorers ===
There were 9 goals scored in 5 matches, for an average of 1.8 goals per match (as of November 9, 2025).

2 goals

- Chloe Cline – Illinois State

1 goal

- Abby Hall – Illinois State
- Tori Angelo – Indiana State
- Mary Hardy – Murray State
- Sophia Schlicklin – Southern Illinois
- Kaysey Castro – UIC
- Hannah Gryzik – UIC
- Katelyn Nardulli – UIC

== All-Tournament team ==
Player	Team
Mika Marolly	Drake
Madelyn Smith	Drake
Chloe Cline	Illinois State
Abby Hall	Illinois State
Madi Valenti	Illinois State
Tori Angelo	Indiana State
Sydney Etter	Murray State
Natalie Miller	Murray State
Olivia Anderson	Southern Illinois
Kasey Castro	UIC
Hannah Gryzik	UIC
Katelyn Nardulli	UIC
**Sara Sanabria**	UIC

MVP in bold
