= 2025 North Carolina Tar Heels women's soccer team =

American college soccer season

2025 North Carolina Tar Heels women's soccer

NCAA Tournament, Round of 16
- Conference: Atlantic Coast Conference
- U. Soc. Coaches poll: No. 13т
- TopDrawerSoccer.com: No. 16
- Record: 13–6–2 (6–4–0 ACC)
- Head coach: Damon Nahas (10th overall, 2nd Head Coach season)
- Associate head coach: Chris Ducar (30th season)
- Assistant coach: Tracey Leone (2nd season)
- Home stadium: Dorrance Field

2025 ACC women's soccer standings
	Conf.						Overall
Team	W		L		T	PCT	W		L		T	PCT
No. 2 Stanford ‍†‍‡‍^{y}	9	–	0	–	1	.950	21	–	2	–	2	.880
No. 11 Notre Dame ‍‍‍^{y}	8	–	1	–	1	.850	15	–	2	–	3	.825
No. 3 Duke ‍‍‍^{y}	7	–	3	–	0	.700	17	–	5	–	1	.761
No. 1 Florida State ‍‍‍^{y}	6	–	2	–	2	.700	16	–	2	–	4	.818
No. 8 Virginia ‍‍‍^{y}	6	–	2	–	2	.700	14	–	3	–	5	.750
No. 24 Louisville ‍‍‍^{y}	6	–	2	–	2	.700	13	–	5	–	3	.690
No. 13т North Carolina ‍‍‍^{y}	6	–	4	–	0	.600	13	–	6	–	2	.667
California ‍‍‍	4	–	2	–	4	.600	8	–	3	–	8	.632
Wake Forest ‍‍‍^{y}	4	–	3	–	3	.550	11	–	5	–	4	.650
NC State ‍‍‍	4	–	4	–	2	.500	5	–	9	–	4	.389
Clemson ‍‍‍^{y}	4	–	4	–	2	.500	8	–	6	–	5	.553
SMU ‍‍‍	2	–	6	–	2	.300	8	–	8	–	2	.500
Pittsburgh ‍‍‍	2	–	8	–	0	.200	6	–	10	–	2	.389
Miami (FL) ‍‍‍	1	–	7	–	2	.200	7	–	8	–	3	.472
Boston College ‍‍‍	1	–	7	–	2	.200	5	–	8	–	5	.417
Syracuse ‍‍‍	1	–	8	–	1	.150	5	–	9	–	4	.389
Virginia Tech ‍‍‍	0	–	8	–	2	.100	4	–	10	–	4	.333
† – Conference champion ‡ – 2025 ACC Tournament champion y – Invited to the NCAA Tournament; As of December 9, 2025; Rankings from United Soccer Coaches Poll; Source: The ACC

The 2025 North Carolina Tar Heels women's soccer team represented the University of North Carolina at Chapel Hill during the 2025 NCAA Division I women's soccer season. This was the 49th season of the university fielding a program, all of which had been played in the Atlantic Coast Conference. The Tar Heels were led by second-year head coach Damon Nahas and played their home games at Dorrance Field in Chapel Hill, North Carolina.

The Tar Heels began the season ranked number one overall in the United Soccer Coaches poll, but lost their season opener at Tennessee. Despite winning their other game during opening week, they fell to 12th in the poll. They lost their third match of the season at Georgia. This saw them drop to 22nd overall. They won their next five games, and only allowed one goal over that span. The only Power 4 opponent they defeated in that stretch was Alabama. They fell to 23rd at the end of the non-conference season, but rose to 19th to start ACC play. They defeated Virginia Tech but fell to 7th ranked Florida State and 2nd ranked Notre Dame. They rebounded with defeats of Boston College and Pittsburgh before losing their rivalry match at 14th ranked Duke. They won three of their last four ACC games, with the lone defeat coming at Miami. They finished the regular season unranked.

The Tar Heels finished the season 13–6–2 overall and 6–4–0 in ACC play to finish in seventh place. They finished one place out of qualifying for the ACC Tournament. It was only the second time in their history that they did not qualify for the tournament. The Tar Heels received an at-large bid to the 2025 NCAA Division I women's soccer tournament, where they were an un-seeded team in the Vanderbilt Bracket. They avenged a season opening loss to third-seed and 14th ranked Tennessee in the first round. They advanced over sixth seed and 18th ranked Texas Tech in a penalty shoot-out in the second round. They fell to second seed and 5th ranked TCU in another penalty shoot-out in the Round of 16 to end their season.

== Previous season ==
The Tar Heels finished the regular season 14–4–0 and 7–3–0 in ACC play to finish in fourth place. As the fourth seed in the ACC Tournament, they hosted fifth seed and twelfth ranked Virginia Tech in the first round and defeated them 2–0. They faced-off against rival Duke for the third time in the season, and got their first win 2–1 to make the finals. The final was a regular season rematch between the Tar Heels and Florida State. The Tar Heels again lost, this time 3–2, to finish as runners up. The Tar Heels received an at-large bid to the 2024 NCAA Division I women's soccer tournament, where they were the second-seed in the Florida State bracket. They defeated USC Upstate in the first round, Santa Clara in the second round, and sixth-seed Minnesota in the Round of 16. Upsets elsewhere in the bracket saw the Tar Heels host Penn State in the quarterfinals. The Tar Heels won 2–1 in overtime to advance to the College Cup. Their semifinal match-up was a fourth meeting in the season with Duke. The Tar Heels won this one 3–0, making the record in the season 2–2, with Duke winning both regular season matches, and the Tar Heels winning both postseason matches. They faced off against Wake Forest in the final, and defeated them 1–0 to win their twenty-second national title and first in twelve years. The Tar Heels' final record was 22–5–0.

== Offseason ==
=== Departures ===
Departures
Name	Number	Pos.	Height	Year	Hometown	Reason for departure
Clare Gagne	0	GK	6'0"	Graduate student	Orono, Minnesota	Graduated; signed professional contract with Kansas City Current
Evelyn Shores	2	MF	5'9"	Sophomore	Atlanta, Georgia	Signed professional contract with Angel City FC
Trinity Armstrong	3	DF	5'6"	Freshman	Frisco, Texas	Signed professional contract with San Diego Wave FC
Maddie Dahlien	5	FW	5'9"	Junior	Edina, Minnesota	Signed professional contract with Seattle Reign FC
Emerson Elgin	6	DF	5'7"	(redshirt) Junior	Franklin Lakes, New Jersey	Graduated; signed professional contract with Gotham FC
Makenna Dominguez	11	MF	5'3"	Senior	Sierra Madre, California	Graduated
Olivia Migli	16	DF	5'4"	Graduate student	Isle of Palms, South Carolina	Graduated
Bella Sember	18	FW/MF	5'7"	Senior	Centerport, New York	Graduated; signed professional contract with KIF Örebro
Aria Nagai	19	MF	5'3"	Graduate student	Herndon, Virginia	Graduated; signed professional contract with Utah Royals
Avery Look	22	DF	5'10"	Graduate student	Chapel Hill, North Carolina	Graduated
Asha Means	39	DF/MF	5'7"	Senior	Charlotte, North Carolina	Graduated
Alexa Wojnovich	44	DF/MF	5'7"	Graduate student	Chapel Hill, North Carolina	Graduated

=== Incoming transfers ===
Incoming transfers
Name	Number	Pos.	Height	Year	Hometown	Previous school
Liya Brooks	0	GK	5'9"	(redshirt) Sophomore	Eugene, Oregon	Washington State
Ryann Brown	12	DF	5'8"	Graduate student	Laguna Niguel, California	Princeton
Emilie Maihs	15	GK	6'1"	Sophomore	Bevergern, Germany	Otero College
Shaela Bradley	43	MF	5'5"	Sophomore	La Center, Washington	Rutgers

=== Recruiting class ===
Name	Nationality	Hometown	Club	TDS rating
Jennifer Dearie; FW	(United States)	Ponte Vedra, Florida	Jacksonville FC	3/5 stars
Bella Devey; MF	(United States)	Draper, Utah	Utah Avalanche	4/5 stars
Eres Freifeld; FW	(United States)	Los Angeles, California	Slammers FC HB Koge	4/5 stars
Riley Kennedy; MF	(United States)	Raleigh, North Carolina	North Carolina Courage (ECNL)	4/5 stars
Djem Koppelaar; DF	(Netherlands)	Eindhoven, Netherlands	PSV Eindhoven	N/A
Lauren Malsom; FW	(United States)	Marietta, Georgia	FC Prime	4/5 stars
Cameron Maynor; DF	(United States)	Atlanta, Georgia	Concorde Fire SC	4/5 stars
Hope Munson; DF	(United States)	Holladay, Utah	Utah Avalanche	4/5 stars

== Squad ==
=== Roster ===
As of February 3, 2026

Note: Flags indicate national team as defined under FIFA eligibility rules; some limited exceptions apply. Players may hold more than one non-FIFA nationality.

No.	Pos.	Nation	Player
0	GK	JAM	Liya Brooks
1	GK	GER	Hannah Johann
2	MF	CAN	Eden Bretzer
3	FW	USA	Jenny Dearie
4	DF	USA	Aven Alvarez
5	DF	NED	Djem Koppelaar
6	MF	USA	Riley Kennedy
7	MF	USA	Linda Ullmark
8	MF	USA	Bella Gaetino
9	DF	USA	Hope Munson
10	MF	USA	Bella Devey
11	FW	USA	Eres Freifeld
12	DF	USA	Ryann Brown
13	FW	USA	Kate Faasse

No.	Pos.	Nation	Player
15	GK	GER	Emilie Maihs
16	DF	USA	Camie Maynor
17	DF	USA	Caitlin Mara
18	MF	USA	Lauren Malsom
20	MF	USA	Ashley Pennie
21	GK	USA	Marisa Shorrock
23	DF	USA	Raegan Williams
25	FW	USA	Logan Tongberg
31	MF	USA	Ella Smith
33	FW	USA	Olivia Thomas
34	DF	USA	Tessa Dellarose
40	GK	USA	Abby Gundry
43	MF	USA	Shaela Bradley

=== Team management ===
Position	Staff
Athletic director	Bubba Cunningham
Head coach	Damon Nahas
Assistant coach/general manager	Chris Ducar
Assistant coach	Tracey Bates Leone
Director of operations	Tom Sander
Assistant director of operations	Corey Emerick

== Schedule ==
Date Time, TV	Rank^{#}	Opponent^{#}	Result	Record	Site (Attendance) City, State
Exhibition
August 6; 6:00 p.m.	No. 1	UNC Wilmington	None Reported	–	Dorrance Field; Chapel Hill, NC
August 9; 6:00 p.m.	No. 1	No. 10 Wake Forest	None Reported	–	Dorrance Field; Chapel Hill, NC
Non-conference regular season
August 14*; 7:00 p.m., SECN	No. 1	at Tennessee	L 0–2	0–1	Regal Soccer Stadium (1,197); Knoxville, TN
August 17; 1:00 p.m., ACCNX	No. 1	Siena	W 5–0	1–1–0	Dorrance Field (1,127); Chapel Hill, NC
August 21*; 6:30 p.m., SECN+	No. 12	at Georgia	L 0–2	1–2–0	Turner Soccer Complex (1,802); Athens, GA
August 24*; 12:00 p.m., ACCNX	No. 12	Rice	W 4–0	2–2–0	Dorrance Field (2,640); Chapel Hill, NC
August 28*; 4:00 p.m., ACCNX	No. 22	UNC Greensboro	W 4–0	3–2–0	Dorrance Field (1,101); Chapel Hill, NC
August 31*; 12:00 p.m., ACCNX	No. 22	Milwaukee	W 4–1	4–2–0	Dorrance Field (1,471); Chapel Hill, NC
September 4*; 7:00 p.m., ACCNX	No. 23	Alabama	W 4–0	5–2–0	Dorrance Field (1,640); Chapel Hill, NC
September 7*; 1:00 p.m., ESPN+	No. 23	at James Madison	W 3–0	6–2–0	Sentara Park (823); Harrisonburg, VA
ACC regular season
September 11; 7:00 p.m., ACCNX	No. 19	at Virginia Tech	W 2–1	7–2–0 (1–0–0)	Thompson Field (1,024); Blacksburg, VA
September 17; 7:00 p.m., ACCN	No. 18	No. 7 Florida State	L 0–1	7–3–0 (1–1–0)	Dorrance Field (3,749); Chapel Hill, North Carolina
September 24; 6:00 p.m., ACCN	No. 22	at No. 2 Notre Dame	L 3–4	7–4–0 (1–2–0)	Alumni Stadium (1,072); Notre Dame, IN
October 2; 7:00 p.m., ACCNX	No. 19	Boston College	W 3–1	8–4–0 (2–2–0)	Dorrance Field (1,377); Chapel Hill, North Carolina
October 5; 4:00 p.m., ACCN	No. 19	Pittsburgh	W 3–1	9–4–0 (3–2–0)	Dorrance Field (2,451); Chapel Hill, North Carolina
October 12; 1:00 p.m., ACCN	No. 19	at No. 14т Duke; Rivalry	L 2–3	9–5–0 (3–3–0)	Koskinen Stadium (1,541); Durham, NC
October 17; 6:00 p.m., ACCNX	No. 23	at SMU	W 3–0	10–5–0 (4–3–0)	Washburne Stadium (2,036); Dallas, TX
October 23; 7:00 p.m., ACCNX	No. 23	at Miami (FL)	L 1–2	10–6–0 (4–4–0)	Cobb Stadium (533); Coral Gables, FL
October 26; 1:00 p.m., ACCNX	No. 23	Syracuse	W 4–2	11–6–0 (5–4–0)	Dorrance Field (1,401); Chapel Hill, North Carolina
October 30; 8:00 p.m., ACCN		NC State	W 1–0	12–6–0 (6–4–0)	Dorrance Field (2,561); Chapel Hill, North Carolina
NCAA Tournament
November 14*; 6:00 p.m., ESPN+		at (3) No. 14 Tennessee; First Round	W 3–1	13–6–0	Regal Soccer Stadium (1,721); Knoxville, TN
November 20*; 5:00 p.m., ESPN+		vs. (6) No. 18 Texas Tech; Second Round	T 1–1 (4–3 PKs) ^{2OT}	13–6–1	Garvey-Rosenthal Stadium (1,543); Fort Worth, TX
November 24*; 2:00 p.m., ESPN+		at (2) No. 5 TCU; Round of 16	T 1–1 (3–4 PKs)	13–6–2	Garvey-Rosenthal Stadium (1,684); Fort Worth, TX
*Non-conference game. ^{#}Rankings from United Soccer Coaches. (#) Tournament seedings in parentheses. All times are in Eastern.

== Awards and honors ==
Recipient	Award	Date	Ref.
Tessa Dellarose	Pre-season All-ACC Team	August 7	
Kate Faasse	Pre-season All-ACC Team	August 7	
Olivia Thomas	Pre-season All-ACC Team	August 7	
Linda Ullmark	Pre-season All-ACC Team	August 7	
Kate Faasse	Top Drawer Soccer Preseason Best XI First Team	August 12	
Tessa Dellarose	Top Drawer Soccer Preseason Best XI First Team	August 12	
Olivia Thomas	Top Drawer Soccer Preseason Best XI Second Team	August 12	
Linda Ullmark	Top Drawer Soccer Preseason Best XI Second Team	August 12	
Bella Devey	Top Drawer Soccer Preseason Best XI Freshman Team	August 12	
Tessa Dellarose	Hermann Trophy Preseason Watchlist	August 14	
Kate Faassee	Hermann Trophy Preseason Watchlist	August 14	
Olivia Thomas	ACC Co-Offensive Player of the Week – Week 8	October 7	
Olivia Thomas	All-ACC First Team	November 5	
Kate Fassse	All-ACC Third Team	November 5	
Linda Ullmark	All-ACC Third Team	November 5	
Hope Munson	ACC All-Freshman Team	November 5	

== Rankings ==
Ranking movements Legend: ██ Increase in ranking ██ Decrease in ranking — = Not ranked RV = Received votes т = Tied with team above or below ( ) = First-place votes
	Week																
Poll	Pre	1	2	3	4	5	6	7	8	9	10	11	12	13	14	15	Final
United Soccer	1 (8)	12	22	23	19	18	22	19	19	23	23	RV	—	Not released			13т
TopDrawer Soccer	1	6	15	19	14	11	11	19	17	23	18	—	—	—	25	16	16
