= 2025 Miami Hurricanes women's soccer team =

American college soccer season

2025 Miami Hurricanes women's soccer
- Conference: Atlantic Coast Conference
- Record: 9–8–3 (1–7–2 ACC)
- Head coach: Ken Masuhr (2nd season)
- Assistant coaches: Kelly Keelan (2nd season); Peter-John Falloon (2nd season)
- Home stadium: Cobb Stadium

2025 ACC women's soccer standings
	Conf.						Overall
Team	W		L		T	PCT	W		L		T	PCT
No. 2 Stanford ‍†‍‡‍^{y}	9	–	0	–	1	.950	21	–	2	–	2	.880
No. 11 Notre Dame ‍‍‍^{y}	8	–	1	–	1	.850	15	–	2	–	3	.825
No. 3 Duke ‍‍‍^{y}	7	–	3	–	0	.700	17	–	5	–	1	.761
No. 1 Florida State ‍‍‍^{y}	6	–	2	–	2	.700	16	–	2	–	4	.818
No. 8 Virginia ‍‍‍^{y}	6	–	2	–	2	.700	14	–	3	–	5	.750
No. 24 Louisville ‍‍‍^{y}	6	–	2	–	2	.700	13	–	5	–	3	.690
No. 13т North Carolina ‍‍‍^{y}	6	–	4	–	0	.600	13	–	6	–	2	.667
California ‍‍‍	4	–	2	–	4	.600	8	–	3	–	8	.632
Wake Forest ‍‍‍^{y}	4	–	3	–	3	.550	11	–	5	–	4	.650
NC State ‍‍‍	4	–	4	–	2	.500	5	–	9	–	4	.389
Clemson ‍‍‍^{y}	4	–	4	–	2	.500	8	–	6	–	5	.553
SMU ‍‍‍	2	–	6	–	2	.300	8	–	8	–	2	.500
Pittsburgh ‍‍‍	2	–	8	–	0	.200	6	–	10	–	2	.389
Miami (FL) ‍‍‍	1	–	7	–	2	.200	7	–	8	–	3	.472
Boston College ‍‍‍	1	–	7	–	2	.200	5	–	8	–	5	.417
Syracuse ‍‍‍	1	–	8	–	1	.150	5	–	9	–	4	.389
Virginia Tech ‍‍‍	0	–	8	–	2	.100	4	–	10	–	4	.333
† – Conference champion ‡ – 2025 ACC Tournament champion y – Invited to the NCAA Tournament; As of December 9, 2025; Rankings from United Soccer Coaches Poll; Source: The ACC

The 2025 Miami Hurricanes women's soccer team represented the University of Miami during the 2025 NCAA Division I women's soccer season. The Hurricanes were led by head coach Ken Masuhr, in his second season. They played home games at Cobb Stadium in Coral Gables, Florida. This was the team's 27th season playing organized women's college soccer and their 22nd playing in the Atlantic Coast Conference.

The Hurricanes started the season with a road win over UNC Asheville. They could not continue their road winning streak with a loss to Appalachian State. The Hurricanes returned home and won four of their next five games, with the only blemish being a 2–2 draw against Princeton. They began ACC play with losses against eighteenth-ranked Wake Forest and second-ranked Duke. They had a final non-conference win against VCU on September 18. They would not win another game until October 23. During this streak they lost five games and drew one. The draw came at SMU and they lost their rivaly match with sixth-ranked Florida State and second-ranked Stanford over the stretch. Their streak ending win was a 2–1 victory over twenty-third ranked North Carolina. They finished the season with a 0–0 draw with Virginia Tech.

The Hurricanes finished the season 7–8–3 overall and 1–7–2 in ACC play to finish in a tie for fourteenth place. They did not qualify for the ACC Tournament and were not invited to the NCAA Tournament. Their nine wins were the most since the 2016 season.

== Previous season ==
The Hurricanes finished the season 5–8–4 overall and 1–6–3 in ACC play to finish in fifteenth place. They did not qualify for the ACC Tournament and were not invited to the NCAA Tournament.

== Offseason ==
=== Departures ===
Departures
Name	Number	Pos.	Height	Year	Hometown	Reason for departure
Claireese Foley	00	GK	5'11"	(redshirt) Freshman	Prosper, Texas	Transferred to TCU
Dieynaba Ndaw	2	FW	5'6"	Graduate Student	Dakar, Senegal	Graduated
Adrianna Serna	3	DF	5'3"	Senior	Las Vegas, Nevada	Graduated
Emilie McCartney	4	DF	5'6"	Sophomore	McKinney, Texas	Transferred to Texas Tech
Jordyn Womack	5	FW	5'7"	Freshman	Las Vegas, Nevada	Transferred to Portland
Julia Edwards	10	MF/FW	5'6"	Graduate Student	Richmond, Virginia	Graduated
Sonia Neighbors	11	FW	5'5"	Sophomore	Montclair, New Jersey	Transferred to NYU
Lana Djuranovic	12	FW/MF	5'6"	Freshman	Scarborough, Maine	—
Emma Pidding	14	FW	5'4"	Junior	San Diego, California	—
Giselle Kozarski	15	MF/FW	5'7"	Graduate Student	Cibolo, Texas	Graduated
Grace Hurren	16	DF/MF	5'8"	Graduate Student	Moorestown, New Jersey	Graduated
Jordan Losey	18	DF	5'7"	(redshirt) Sophomore	Corona, California	Transferred to Kansas State
Kyla Gallagher	21	DF/MF	5'7"	Graduate Student	Farmington, Connecticut	Graduated
Megan Morgan	22	FW	5'4"	(redshirt) Junior	Weston, Florida	Graduated
Faith Graziano	23	MF	5'5"	Freshman	Middlebury, Connecticut	Transferred to Navy
Hallie Salas	29	DF	5'7"	Senior	Cary, North Carolina	Graduated
Zoe Shepherd	30	FW	5'6"	Junior	Novato, California	—
Hanna Moore	33	DF	5'8"	Graduate Student	Eagle Mountain, Utah	Graduated
Gray Wilson	45	GK	5'10"	Freshman	Rocklin, California	Transferred to Colorado State

=== Incoming transfers ===
Incoming transfers
Name	Number	Pos.	Height	Year	Hometown	Previous school
Emily Bredek	0	GK	5'7"	Senior	Huntington Beach, California	Old Dominion
Lauren Rodriguez	1	GK	5'11"	Senior	Hamilton, New York	Columbia
Emilie Simpson	2	MF	5'8"	Junior	Cambridge, England	Arizona State
Éabha O'Mahony	10	DF/MF	5'7"	Senior	Cork, Ireland	Texas
Cisel Akgül	11	FW	5'5"	Sophomore	Kamen, Germany	Flagler
Allie Serlenga	15	FW	5'7"	Sophomore	Mount Laurel, New Jersey	Clemson
Sarah Greiner	16	MF	5'9"	Junior	Braselton, Georgia	Tennessee
Lexi Lerwick	18	DF	5'9"	(redshirt) Junior	Des Moines, Washington	Oregon
Brie Severns	22	FW	5'10"	Graduate Student	Lee's Summit, Missouri	Texas A&M
Nanaka Inaba	23	FW	—	Senior	Suntō-Gun, Japan	Jacksonville State
Atlee Olofson	33	GK	5'8"	Junior	Austin, Texas	Notre Dame

=== Recruiting class ===
Name	Nationality	Hometown	Club	TDS Rating
Sasha Brewer; DF	(United States)	Stilwell, Kansas	KC Athletics	3/5 stars
Samantha Marella; DF	(United States)	Calabasas, California	Legends FC	3/5 stars
Taylor Maxwell; DF	(United States)	Langhorne, Pennsylvania	Philadelphia Ukrainian Nationals	3/5 stars
Teegan Melenhorst; FW	(Canada)	Ottawa, Canada	Ottawa Nepean Hotspurs SC	N/A
Maya Paeske; FW	(United States)	San Diego, California	City SC	3/5 stars
Amanda Peck; DF	(United States)	Foxborough, Massachusetts	NEFC	3/5 stars
Elani-Hazel Randall; FW	(United States)	Plant City, Florida	West Florida Flames	3/5 stars
Noelle Simmons; FW	(United States)	Boynton Beach, Florida	Wellington Wave	3/5 stars

== Squad ==
=== Roster ===
As of December 29, 2025

Note: Flags indicate national team as defined under FIFA eligibility rules; some limited exceptions apply. Players may hold more than one non-FIFA nationality.

No.	Pos.	Nation	Player
0	GK	USA	Emily Bredek
1	GK	USA	Lauren Rodriguez
2	MF	ENG	Emilie Simpson
3	FW	USA	Noelle Simmons
4	DF	USA	Sam Marella
5	DF	USA	Amanda Peck
6	DF	USA	Tori Grambo
7	FW	USA	Caroline Hood
8	MF	USA	Ciara Alarocn
9	FW	BRA	Giovana Canali
10	DF	IRL	Éabha O'Mahony
11	FW	GER	Cisel Akgül
12	FW	CAN	Teegan Melenhorst
13	MF	USA	Crosby Nicholson

No.	Pos.	Nation	Player
14	DF	USA	Taylor Maxwell
15	FW	USA	Allie Serlenga
16	MF	USA	Sarah Greiner
17	FW	USA	Moira Flynn
18	DF	USA	Lexi Lerwick
19	MF	USA	Maddie Landers
20	DF	USA	Reese Wheeler
21	FW	USA	Maya Paeske
22	FW	USA	Brie Severns
23	FW	JPN	Nanaka Inaba
24	DF	USA	Sasha Brewer
25	FW	USA	Jessica Kaye
33	GK	USA	Atlee Olofson
48	FW	USA	Sage Carey

=== Team management ===
Position	Staff
Head coach	Ken Masuhr
Assistant Coach	Kelly Keelan
Assistant Coach	Peter-John Falloon
Director of Operations	Hannah Bernick
Athletic Trainer	Karl Rennalls

== Schedule ==
Date Time, TV	Rank^{#}	Opponent^{#}	Result	Record	Site (Attendance) City, State
Exhibition
August 3*; 2:30 p.m.		Florida Gulf Coast	None Reported	–	Cobb Stadium; Coral Gables, FL
August 8*; 2:30 p.m.		UCF	None Reported	–	Cobb Stadium; Coral Gables, FL
Regular season
August 14*; 6:00 p.m., ESPN+		at UNC Asheville	W 1–0	1–0–0	Greenwood Soccer Field (350); Asheville, NC
August 17*; 12:00 p.m., ESPN+		at Appalachian State	L 0–1	1–1–0	ASU Soccer Stadium (562); Boone, NC
August 21*; 7:00 p.m., ACCNX		Florida Atlantic	W 4–0	2–1–0	Cobb Stadium (755); Coral Gables, FL
August 24*; 1:00 p.m., ACCNX		Jacksonville	W 1–0	3–1–0	Cobb Stadium (220); Coral Gables, FL
August 28*; 7:00 p.m., ACCNX		Lipscomb	W 3–2	4–1–0	Cobb Stadium (147); Coral Gables, FL
September 4*; 7:00 p.m., ACCNX		Princeton	T 2–2	4–1–1	Cobb Stadium (265); Coral Gables, FL
September 7*; 5:00 p.m., ACCNX		FIU	W 2–0	5–1–1	Cobb Stadium (333); Coral Gables, FL
September 10; 8:00 p.m., ACCN		at No. 18 Wake Forest	L 1–3	5–2–1 (0–1–0)	Spry Stadium (506); Winston-Salem, NC
September 14; 1:00 p.m., ACCNX		No. 2 Duke	L 0–1	5–3–1 (0–2–0)	Cobb Stadium (275); Coral Gables, FL
September 18*; 7:00 p.m., ESPN+		at VCU	W 2–0	6–3–1	Sports Backers Stadium (149); Richmond, VA
September 25; 7:00 p.m., ACCNX		at Louisville	L 0–2	6–4–1 (0–3–0)	Lynn Stadium (300); Louisville, KY
September 28; 2:00 p.m., ACCNX		at SMU	T 0–0	6–4–2 (0–3–1)	Washburne Stadium (551); Dallas, TX
October 3; 7:00 p.m., ACCNX		at No. 6 Florida State; Rivalry	L 0–3	6–5–2 (0–4–1)	Seminole Soccer Complex (2,147); Tallahassee, FL
October 11; 7:00 p.m., ACCNX		Syracuse	L 0–1	6–6–2 (0–5–1)	Cobb Stadium (223); Coral Gables, FL
October 16; 7:00 p.m., ACCNX		California	L 0–2	6–7–2 (0–6–1)	Cobb Stadium (145); Coral Gables, FL
October 19; 12:00 p.m., ACCN		No. 2 Stanford	L 2–3	6–8–2 (0–7–1)	Cobb Stadium (205); Coral Gables, FL
October 23; 7:00 p.m., ACCNX		No. 23 North Carolina	W 2–1	7–8–2 (1–7–1)	Cobb Stadium (533); Coral Gables, FL
October 30; 7:00 p.m., ACCNX		at Virginia Tech	T 0–0	7–8–3 (1–7–2)	Thompson Field (243); Blacksburg, VA
*Non-conference game. ^{#}Rankings from United Soccer Coaches. (#) Tournament seedings in parentheses.

== Rankings ==
Ranking movements Legend: — = Not ranked
	Week																
Poll	Pre	1	2	3	4	5	6	7	8	9	10	11	12	13	14	15	Final
United Soccer	—	—	—	—	—	—	—	—	—	—	—	—	—	Not released			—
TopDrawer Soccer	—	—	—	—	—	—	—	—	—	—	—	—	—	—	—	—	—
