= 2025 Pittsburgh Panthers women's soccer team =

American college soccer season

2025 Pittsburgh Panthers women's soccer
- Conference: Atlantic Coast Conference
- Record: 6–10–2 (2–8–0 ACC)
- Head coach: Ben Waldrum (8th overall, 1st head coach season)
- Assistant coaches: Jesse Goleman (3rd season); Brianna Alleyne (1st season)
- Home stadium: Ambrose Urbanic Field

2025 ACC women's soccer standings
	Conf.						Overall
Team	W		L		T	PCT	W		L		T	PCT
No. 2 Stanford ‍†‍‡‍^{y}	9	–	0	–	1	.950	21	–	2	–	2	.880
No. 11 Notre Dame ‍‍‍^{y}	8	–	1	–	1	.850	15	–	2	–	3	.825
No. 3 Duke ‍‍‍^{y}	7	–	3	–	0	.700	17	–	5	–	1	.761
No. 1 Florida State ‍‍‍^{y}	6	–	2	–	2	.700	16	–	2	–	4	.818
No. 8 Virginia ‍‍‍^{y}	6	–	2	–	2	.700	14	–	3	–	5	.750
No. 24 Louisville ‍‍‍^{y}	6	–	2	–	2	.700	13	–	5	–	3	.690
No. 13т North Carolina ‍‍‍^{y}	6	–	4	–	0	.600	13	–	6	–	2	.667
California ‍‍‍	4	–	2	–	4	.600	8	–	3	–	8	.632
Wake Forest ‍‍‍^{y}	4	–	3	–	3	.550	11	–	5	–	4	.650
NC State ‍‍‍	4	–	4	–	2	.500	5	–	9	–	4	.389
Clemson ‍‍‍^{y}	4	–	4	–	2	.500	8	–	6	–	5	.553
SMU ‍‍‍	2	–	6	–	2	.300	8	–	8	–	2	.500
Pittsburgh ‍‍‍	2	–	8	–	0	.200	6	–	10	–	2	.389
Miami (FL) ‍‍‍	1	–	7	–	2	.200	7	–	8	–	3	.472
Boston College ‍‍‍	1	–	7	–	2	.200	5	–	8	–	5	.417
Syracuse ‍‍‍	1	–	8	–	1	.150	5	–	9	–	4	.389
Virginia Tech ‍‍‍	0	–	8	–	2	.100	4	–	10	–	4	.333
† – Conference champion ‡ – 2025 ACC Tournament champion y – Invited to the NCAA Tournament; As of December 9, 2025; Rankings from United Soccer Coaches Poll; Source: The ACC

The 2025 Pittsburgh Panthers women's soccer team represented the University of Pittsburgh during the 2025 NCAA Division I women's soccer season. The Panthers were led by head coach Ben Waldrum, in his eighth season with the program, and first as head coach. They played their home games at Ambrose Urbanic Field in Pittsburgh, Pennsylvania. This is the team's 30th season playing organized women's college soccer and their 13th playing in the Atlantic Coast Conference. Ben Waldrum replaced Randy Waldrum when Randy was elevated to the program's technical director in May of 2025.

The Panther's season started well as they won their first four non-conference games. The highlight of the four was a win over eventual Big East champions Xavier. The streak ended with two straight losses against teams from California in Cal State Fullerton and Santa Clara. The Panthers finished the non-conference season with two draws, and had a final non-conference record of 4–2–2. To start the ACC season, they hosted the two California schools in California and third-ranked Stanford. The Panthers lost both matches, 1–2 and 0–6. They earned their first ACC victory on a trip to Boston College where they won 2–1. After the victory, the Panthers lost their next six ACC games. Three of those losses came against ranked opponents in fourteenth-ranked Duke, nineteenth-ranked North Carolina and third-ranked Virginia. They finished their season with an upset of the top ranked Notre Dame Fighting Irish 1–0 at home.

The Panthers finished the season 6–10–2 overall and 2–8–0 in ACC play to finish in thirteenth place. The team did not qualify for the ACC Tournament and were not invited to the NCAA Tournament. Their six total wins and two total conference wins were the lowest since 2019.

== Previous season ==
The Panthers finished the season 9–6–3 overall and 3–5–2 in ACC play to finish in eleventh place. The team did not qualify for the ACC Tournament and were not invited to the NCAA Tournament. This season broke a streak of two consecutive qualifications for both of those tournaments. Their nine total wins were the lowest since 2019. Their three conference wins were the lowest since a pandemic shortented 2020 season.

== Offseason ==
=== Departures ===
Departures
Name	Number	Pos.	Height	Year	Hometown	Reason for departure
Haylee Mersereau	2	DF	5'8"	Junior	Boca Raton, Florida	Transferred to UCF
Ellie Coffield	4	MF	5'6"	Senior	Mars, Pennsylvania	Graduated
Sarah Schupansky	5	FW	5'5"	Senior	Pittsburgh, Pennsylvania	Graduated; signed professional contract with Gotham FC
Briana Rodriguez	6	MF	5'4"	Junior	Gurnee, Illinois	Transferred to Ole Miss
Deborah Abiodun	8	MF	5'4"	Sophomore	Oyo, Nigeria	Signed professional contract with Washington Spirit
Keera Melenhorst	10	MF	5'3"	Senior	Ottawa, Canada	Graduated
Mackenzie Evers	11	DF	5'9"	Senior	Oakdale, Pennsylvania	Graduated
Ashley Moon	13	DF	5'6"	Senior	Somers, New York	Graduated
Chloe Minas	15	MF	5'3"	Graduate Student	Montreal, Canada	Graduated
Aliya Gomes	17	FW	5'3"	Sophomore	Bradford, Ontario	Transferred to South Alabama
Paige Dziedzic	18	FW	5'8"	Sophomore	Chicago, Illinois	Transferred to Marquette
Grace Pettet	19	DF	5'8"	Graduate Student	Tulsa, Oklahoma	Graduated
Samiah Phiri	23	FW	5'8"	Senior	Irving, Texas	Graduated
Emma Rhoades	24	MF	5'3"	Sophomore	Fenton, Michigan	Transferred to Toledo
Coco Dorfman	25	DF	5'9"	Freshman	San Diego, California	Transferred to Marquette
Ava Boyd	26	FW	5'7"	Sophomore	Pittsburgh, Pennsylvania	Transferred to Florida Gulf Coast
Dakota Watterson	27	FW	5'4"	Freshman	Clovis, California	Transferred to UC Santa Barbara Gauchos
Chloe Brecht	28	FW	5'5"	Freshman	Powell, Ohio	Transferred to Butler
Olivia Duray	29	MF	5'3"	Sophomore	Woodridge, Illinois	Transferred to Creighton
Kaitlyn Killinger	30	FW	5'9"	Sophomore	Plum, Pennsylvania	Transferred to Duquesne
Erika Schneider	32	DF	5'10"	Freshman	Aldie, Virginia	Transferred to Richmond
Emma Van Meter	33	GK	5'8"	Sophomore	Pittsburgh, Pennsylvania	—
Rylee Keeley	34	MF	5'11"	Freshman	Wake Forest, North Carolina	Transferred to Brown
Emily Graeca	35	DF	5'5"	Freshman	DuBois, Pennsylvania	Transferred to James Madison

=== Incoming transfers ===
Incoming transfers
Name	Number	Pos.	Height	Year	Hometown	Previous school
Mya Archibald	2	DF	5'7"	Junior	Fall River, Canada	Illinois
Mariama Dabo	6	MF	5'5"	Junior	Paris, France	Jacksonville
Alia Jaidi	18	FW	5'6"	Graduate Student	Casablanca, Morocco	Barry

=== Recruiting class ===
Name	Nationality	Hometown	Club	TDS Rating
Adi Bianchin; FW	(Canada)	Oakville, Canada	Thomas Blakelock	N/A
Maya Bright; FW	(United States)	Philadelphia, Pennsylvania	FC Delco	3/5 stars
Maya Bruce; MF	(United States)	Kennett Square, Pennsylvania	Penn Fusion	3/5 stars
Katie Ellermeyer; MF	(United States)	San Diego, California	San Diego Surf	3/5 stars
Hannah Minogue; MF	(United States)	Brambleton, Virginia	Virginia Development Academy	3/5 stars
Juidth Okah; FW	(Nigeria)	Ebonyi, Nigeria	Remo Stars	N/A
Claire Pannier-Jacquemart; DF	(France)	Toulouse, France	Toulouse FC	N/A
Sophie Rourke; MF	(United States)	Amherst, New York	WNY Flash	3/5 stars
Ellie Rowlands; MF	(United States)	Columbus, Ohio	Ohio Premier	3/5 stars
Holly Tickle; DF	(England)	Preston, England	Liverpool	N/A
Roos Wittgen; MF	(Netherlands)	Eindhoven, Netherlands	PSV	N/A
Krystina Wolf; GK	(United States)	Wayne, New Jersey	STA	3/5 stars
Adoo Philomina Yina; MF	(Nigeria)	Makurdi, Nigeria	Nasarawa Amazons FC	N/A
Hannah Yusuf; MF	(Nigeria)	Igarra, Nigeria	Confluence Queens	N/A

== Squad ==
=== Roster ===
As of January 2, 2026

Note: Flags indicate national team as defined under FIFA eligibility rules; some limited exceptions apply. Players may hold more than one non-FIFA nationality.

No.	Pos.	Nation	Player
0	GK	USA	Ellie Breech
1	GK	USA	Abigail Reisz
2	DF	CAN	Mya Archibald
3	FW	USA	Maya Bright
4	DF	ENG	Holly Tickle
5	DF	FRA	Claire Pannier-Jacquemart
6	MF	FRA	Mariama Dabo
7	FW	CAN	Sofia Doheny
8	FW	USA	Lola Abraham
9	FW	USA	Lucia Wells
10	MF	NED	Roos Wittgen
11	MF	CAN	Magali Gagne
12	DF	USA	Sage Stelzer
13	DF	USA	Maya Bruce
14	DF	USA	Olivia Lee

No.	Pos.	Nation	Player
15	FW	CAN	Adi Bianchin
16	FW	USA	Margaret Wilde
17	MF	USA	Hannah Minogue
18	FW	MAR	Alia Jaidi
19	FW	USA	Emily Cooper
20	MF	NGA	Celine Ottah
21	DF	USA	Katie Zailski
22	FW	USA	Bailey Wagenknecht
23	GK	USA	Krystina Wolf
24	MF	USA	Kaite Ellermeyer
26	FW	NGA	Okah Adaobi Judith
27	MF	NGA	Adoo Philomina Yina
28	FW	USA	Ellie Rowlands
30	DF	USA	Sophie Rourke

=== Team management ===
Position	Staff
Technical Director	Randy Waldrum
Head coach	Ben Waldrum
Assistant Coach	Jesse Goleman
Assistant Coach	Brianna Alleyne

== Schedule ==
Date Time, TV	Rank^{#}	Opponent^{#}	Result	Record	Site (Attendance) City, State
Exhibition
August 2*; 5:00 p.m.		at West Virginia	L 0–1	—	Dick Dlesk Soccer Stadium; Morgantown, WV
August 9*; 1:00 p.m.		at Michigan	None Reported	—	U-M Soccer Stadium; Ann Arbor, MI
Non-conference regular season
August 14*; 7:00 p.m., ACCNX		Xavier	W 2–0	1–0–0	Ambrose Urbanic Field (516); Pittsburgh, PA
August 17*; 1:00 p.m., FloCollege		at Monmouth	W 3–1	2–0–0	Hesse Field (175); West Long Branch, NJ
August 21*; 5:00 p.m., ACCNX		Ohio	W 1–0	3–0–0	Ambrose Urbanic Field (950); Pittsburgh, PA
August 24*; 6:00 p.m., ESPN+		at Dayton	W 3–0	4–0–0	Baujan Field (981); Dayton, OH
August 28*; 7:00 p.m., ACCNX		Cal State Fullerton	L 0–1	4–1–0	Ambrose Urbanic Field (240); Pittsburgh, PA
August 31*; 12:00 p.m., ACCNX		Santa Clara	L 0–2	4–2–0	Ambrose Urbanic Field (381); Pittsburgh, PA
September 4*; 7:00 p.m., ACCNX		Cincinnati	T 1–1	4–2–1	Ambrose Urbanic Field (247); Pittsburgh, PA
September 7*; 1:00 p.m., ACCNX		Bucknell	T 1–1	4–2–2	Ambrose Urbanic Field (299); Pittsburgh, PA
ACC Regular season
September 11; 7:00 p.m., ACCNX		California	L 1–2	4–3–2 (0–1–0)	Ambrose Urbanic Field (498); Pittsburgh, PA
September 14; 1:00 p.m., ACCNX		No. 3 Stanford	L 0–6	4–4–2 (0–2–0)	Ambrose Urbanic Field (487); Pittsburgh, PA
September 18; 7:00 p.m., ACCNX		at Boston College	W 2–1	5–4–2 (1–2–0)	Newton Campus Soccer Field (457); Chestnut Hill, MA
September 25; 7:00 p.m., ACCNX		SMU	L 0–4	5–5–2 (1–3–0)	Ambrose Urbanic Field (261); Pittsburgh, PA
October 2; 7:00 p.m., ACCNX		at No. 14 Duke	L 0–5	5–6–2 (1–4–0)	Koskinen Stadium (377); Durham, NC
October 5; 4:00 p.m., ACCN		at No. 19 North Carolina	L 1–3	5–7–2 (1–5–0)	Dorrance Field (2,451); Chapel Hill, NC
October 17; 7:00 p.m., ACCNX		NC State	L 0–1	5–8–2 (1–6–0)	Ambrose Urbanic Field (823); Pittsburgh, PA
October 23; 7:00 p.m., ACCNX		at Wake Forest	L 1–2	5–9–2 (1–7–0)	Spry Stadium (690); Winston-Salem, NC
October 26; 2:00 p.m., ACCNX		at No. 3 Virginia	L 0–2	5–10–2 (1–8–0)	Klöckner Stadium (N/A); Charlottesville, VA
October 30; 7:00 p.m., ACCNX		No. 1 Notre Dame	W 1–0	6–10–2 (2–8–0)	Ambrose Urbanic Field (468); Pittsburgh, PA
*Non-conference game. ^{#}Rankings from United Soccer Coaches. (#) Tournament seedings in parentheses. All times are in Eastern.

== Awards and honors ==
Recipient	Award	Date	Ref.
Abby Resiz	ACC Defensive Player of the Week – Week 12	October 31	

== Rankings ==
Ranking movements Legend: — = Not ranked
	Week																
Poll	Pre	1	2	3	4	5	6	7	8	9	10	11	12	13	14	15	Final
United Soccer	—	—	—	—	—	—	—	—	—	—	—	—	—	Not released			—
TopDrawer Soccer	—	—	—	—	—	—	—	—	—	—	—	—	—	—	—	—	—
