= 2025 Florida State Seminoles women's soccer team =

American college soccer season

2025 Florida State Seminoles women's soccer

National Champions

NCAA Tournament, College Cup
- Conference: Atlantic Coast Conference
- U. Soc. Coaches poll: No. 1
- TopDrawerSoccer.com: No. 1
- Record: 16–2–4 (6–2–2 ACC)
- Head coach: Brian Pensky (4th season)
- Associate head coach: Bobby Shuttleworth (4th season)
- Assistant coaches: Micah Bledsoe (2nd season); Erwin van Bennekom (1st season)
- Home stadium: Seminole Soccer Complex

2025 ACC women's soccer standings
	Conf.						Overall
Team	W		L		T	PCT	W		L		T	PCT
No. 2 Stanford ‍†‍‡‍^{y}	9	–	0	–	1	.950	21	–	2	–	2	.880
No. 11 Notre Dame ‍‍‍^{y}	8	–	1	–	1	.850	15	–	2	–	3	.825
No. 3 Duke ‍‍‍^{y}	7	–	3	–	0	.700	17	–	5	–	1	.761
No. 1 Florida State ‍‍‍^{y}	6	–	2	–	2	.700	16	–	2	–	4	.818
No. 8 Virginia ‍‍‍^{y}	6	–	2	–	2	.700	14	–	3	–	5	.750
No. 24 Louisville ‍‍‍^{y}	6	–	2	–	2	.700	13	–	5	–	3	.690
No. 13т North Carolina ‍‍‍^{y}	6	–	4	–	0	.600	13	–	6	–	2	.667
California ‍‍‍	4	–	2	–	4	.600	8	–	3	–	8	.632
Wake Forest ‍‍‍^{y}	4	–	3	–	3	.550	11	–	5	–	4	.650
NC State ‍‍‍	4	–	4	–	2	.500	5	–	9	–	4	.389
Clemson ‍‍‍^{y}	4	–	4	–	2	.500	8	–	6	–	5	.553
SMU ‍‍‍	2	–	6	–	2	.300	8	–	8	–	2	.500
Pittsburgh ‍‍‍	2	–	8	–	0	.200	6	–	10	–	2	.389
Miami (FL) ‍‍‍	1	–	7	–	2	.200	7	–	8	–	3	.472
Boston College ‍‍‍	1	–	7	–	2	.200	5	–	8	–	5	.417
Syracuse ‍‍‍	1	–	8	–	1	.150	5	–	9	–	4	.389
Virginia Tech ‍‍‍	0	–	8	–	2	.100	4	–	10	–	4	.333
† – Conference champion ‡ – 2025 ACC Tournament champion y – Invited to the NCAA Tournament; As of December 9, 2025; Rankings from United Soccer Coaches Poll; Source: The ACC

The 2025 Florida State Seminoles women's soccer team represented Florida State University during the 2025 NCAA Division I women's soccer season. This marked the 31st season of the university fielding a women's soccer program, during all of which they have been members of the Atlantic Coast Conference. The Seminoles were led by fourth-year head coach Brian Pensky, and played their home games at Seminole Soccer Complex in Tallahassee, Florida.

The Seminoles began the season ranked third in the United Soccer Coaches poll and opened the season with a rivaly match against Florida. They won that match 5–0 and suffered their first setback of the season when the drew at Kansas 1–1. The darw saw them fall to seventh in the rankings. They won their final two non-conference games of the season by a combined score of 12–0 and stayed ranked seventh to enter ACC play. They won their first three ACC matches without allowing a goal. The stretch included a defeat of eighteenth ranked North Carolina. They allowed their second goal of the season in a 1–1 draw with NC State before defeating rivals Miami 3–0. The Seminoles rose to fifth in the rankings before losing their next two games, both against the second ranked team at the time. They lost 4–2 at Notre Dame and 2–1 at home against Stanford. They drew 2–2 against California to fall to eleventh in the rankings. They then defeated third ranked Virginia away and Wake Forest at home to finish the regular season.

The Seminoles finished the regular season 10–2–3 and 6–2–2 in ACC play to finish in a three-way tie for fourth place. As the fourth seed in the ACC Tournament, they hosted fifth seed and seventh ranked Virginia in the First Round, in a rematch of a game that occurred just ten days earlier. The Seminoles were eliminated via penalty shoot-out. They received an at-large bid to the NCAA Tournament and were the third seed in the Notre Dame. They defeated Samford in the First Round for the second straight year, Lipscomb in the Second Round, and second seed and tenth-ranked Georgetown in the Round of 16 to advance to the Quarterfinals. They defeated Ohio State 4–1 to advance to the College Cup. In the Semifinal they defeated second seed and fifth ranked TCU 1–0 to advance to the Final. There they faced fellow ACC foe Stanford in a rematch of an October 16 game. The Seminoles avenged their regular season loss and won the game 1–0. The title was the Seminoles' fifth overall and third in the last six years. They finished the season with a 16–2–4 record.

== Previous season ==
The Seminoles finished the regular season 12–2–2 and 7–2–1 in ACC play to finish in a tie for second place. As the third seed in the ACC Tournament, they hosted sixth seed and thirteenth ranked Notre Dame in the First Round. The Seminoles won and advanced to the Semifinals where they advanced via penalty shoot-out against Wake Forest. The Final was a rematch of a regular season foe North Carolina, which the Seminoles won 3–2. This was the Seminoles seventh consecutive ACC tournament title. As tournament champions, they received an automatic bid to the NCAA Tournament and were the first seed in the Florida State Bracket. They defeated Samford in the First Round, before being upset by Vanderbilt in the Second Round via penalty shoot-out. Florida State ended the season with a 15–2–4 overall record.

== Offseason ==
=== Departures ===
Departures
Name	Number	Pos.	Height	Year	Hometown	Reason for departure
Taylor Huff	3	MF/FW	5'8"	Senior	Mansfield, Ohio	Graduated; signed professional contract with Bay FC
Ran Iwai	7	DF	5'3"	Graduate Student	Tokyo, Japan	Graduated; signed professional contract with FC Rosengård
Nina Norshie	12	DF	5'9"	Junior	Accra, Ghana	Transferred to Texas State
Camille Ashe	13	DF	5'10"	Graduate Student	Arlington, Virginia	Graduated; signed professional contract with Djurgårdens IF
Carissa Boeckmann	14	MF	5'5"	Senior	San Antonio, Texas	Graduated; signed professional contract with Portland Thorns FC
Emma Kirlin	18	GK	5'7"	Freshman	Greenville, South Carolina	Transferred to South Carolina
Olivia Lebdaoui	21	FW	5'6"	Junior	Panama City Beach, Florida	Transferred to Iowa
Maddie Smith	23	GK	5'8"	Graduate Student	Omaha, Nebraska	Graduated
Ashlyn Puerta	30	MF/FW	5'7"	Freshman	San Diego, California	Signed professional contract with Sporting JAX

=== Incoming transfers ===
Incoming transfers
Name	Number	Pos.	Height	Year	Hometown	Previous school
Janet Okeke	8	DF	5'7"	Sophomore	Laval, Canada	NC State
Yuna McCormack	14	MF	5'9"	Junior	Mill Valley, California	Virginia
Enasia Colon	23	MF/FW	5'4"	Senior	Bradenton, Florida	Arizona State

=== Recruiting class ===
Name	Nationality	Hometown	Club	TDS Rating
Nawreen Ahmad; MF	(United States)	Falls Church, Virginia	Fairfax Virginia Union	3/5 stars
Ashlyn Anderson; FW	(United States)	Carmen, Indiana	Indy Premier Soccer Club	4/5 stars
Mya Brandon; DF	(United States)	Canton, Michigan	Michigan Hawks	4/5 stars
Omotara Junaid; MF	(Nigeria)	Jacksonville, Florida	Arsenal	N/A
Jaida McGrew; FW	(United States)	Stanley, North Carolina	Charlotte Soccer Academy	4/5 stars
Evan O'Steen; GK	(United States)	Grapevine, Texas	Solar Soccer Club	4/5 stars
Kate Ockene; GK	(United States)	Sandy, Utah	La Roca FC	3/5 stars
Kai Price; DF	(United States)	Duluth, Georgia	Concorde Fire SC	4/5 stars
Nyanya Touray; FW	(United States)	Silver Spring, Maryland	Bethesda SC	4/5 stars

== Squad ==
=== Roster ===
As of February 9, 2026

Note: Flags indicate national team as defined under FIFA eligibility rules; some limited exceptions apply. Players may hold more than one non-FIFA nationality.

No.	Pos.	Nation	Player
1	GK	USA	Adelyn Todd
2	GK	USA	Evan O'Steen
3	FW	USA	Jaida McGrew
4	DF	USA	Kai Price
5	FW	USA	Giana Riley
6	MF	BRA	Lara Dantas
7	FW	USA	Nyanya Touray
8	DF	CAN	Janet Okeke
9	FW	USA	Taylor Suarez
10	MF	USA	Peyton Nourse
11	FW	USA	Jordynn Dudley
12	MF	USA	Peyton McGovern
13	DF	USA	Mya Brandon
14	MF	USA	Yuna McCormack

No.	Pos.	Nation	Player
16	MF	USA	Sophia Nguyen
17	MF	JAM	Mimi Van Zanten
18	GK	USA	Kate Ockene
19	FW	JAM	Kameron Simmonds
20	DF	USA	Heather Gilchrist
21	MF	USA	Nawreen Ahmad
22	DF	USA	Claire Rain
23	MF	USA	Enasia Colon
24	FW	USA	Ashlyn Anderson
28	FW	JAM	Solai Washington
30	MF	VEN	Marianyela Jiménez
42	FW	USA	Wrianna Hudson
50	MF	USA	Omotara Junaid

=== Team management ===
Position	Staff
Athletic Director	Michael Alford
Head coach	Brian Pensky
Associate Head Coach	Bobby Shuttleworth
Assistant Coach	Micah Bledsoe
Assistant Coach	Erwin van Bennekom
Director of Operations	Mackenzie Ostrom

== Schedule ==
Date Time, TV	Rank^{#}	Opponent^{#}	Result	Record	Site (Attendance) City, State
Exhibition
August 8*; 6:00 p.m.	No. 3	Alabama	W 4–1	—	Seminole Soccer Complex; Tallahassee, FL
Non-conference Regular season
August 14*; 7:00 p.m., ACCN	No. 3	Florida; Rivalry	W 5–0	1–0	Seminole Soccer Complex (1,600); Tallahassee, FL
August 17*; 7:00 p.m., ACCNX	No. 3	FIU	W 2–0	2–0	Seminole Soccer Complex (1,004); Tallahassee, FL
August 28*; 8:00 p.m., ESPN+	No. 6	at Kansas	T 1–1	2–0–1	Rock Chalk Park (2,108); Lawrence, KS
September 4*; 7:00 p.m., ACCNX	No. 7	Stetson	W 7–0	3–0–1	Seminole Soccer Complex (1,251); Tallahassee, FL
September 7*; 12:00 p.m., ESPN+	No. 7	at Florida Atlantic	W 5–0	4–0–1	FAU Soccer Stadium (424); Boca Raton, FL
ACC Regular season
September 11; 7:00 p.m., ACCNX	No. 7	Louisville	W 2–0	5–0–1 (1–0–0)	Seminole Soccer Complex (1,330); Tallahassee, FL
September 14; 1:00 p.m., ACCNX	No. 7	at Syracuse	W 4–0	6–0–1 (2–0–0)	SU Soccer Stadium (321); Syracuse, NY
September 17; 7:00 p.m., ACCN	No. 7	at No. 18 North Carolina	W 1–0	7–0–1 (3–0–0)	Dorrance Field (3,749); Chapel Hill, NC
September 21; 1:00 p.m., ACCNX	No. 7	at NC State	T 1–1	7–0–2 (3–0–1)	Dail Soccer Field (1,007); Raleigh, NC
October 3; 7:00 p.m., ACCNX	No. 6	Miami (FL); Rivalry	W 3–0	8–0–2 (4–0–1)	Seminole Soccer Complex (2,147); Tallahassee, FL
October 9; 7:00 p.m., ACCN	No. 5	at No. 2 Notre Dame	L 2–4	8–1–2 (4–1–1)	Alumni Stadium (1,156); Notre Dame, IN
October 16; 7:00 p.m., ACCNX	No. 7	No. 2 Stanford	L 1–2	8–2–2 (4–2–1)	Seminole Soccer Complex (2,582); Tallahassee, FL
October 19; 1:00 p.m., ACCNX	No. 7	California	T 2–2	8–2–3 (4–2–2)	Seminole Soccer Complex (542); Tallahassee, FL
October 23; 6:00 p.m., ACCN	No. 11	at No. 3 Virginia	W 3–2	9–2–3 (5–2–2)	Klöckner Stadium (1,712); Charlottesville, VA
October 30; 6:00 p.m., ACCN	No. 6	Wake Forest	W 4–1	10–2–3 (6–2–2)	Seminole Soccer Complex (1,109); Tallahassee, FL
ACC Tournament
November 2; 8:00 p.m., ACCN	(4) No. 6	(5) No. 7 Virginia; Quarterfinal	T 0–0 (5–6 PKs)	10–2–4	Seminole Soccer Complex (1,072); Tallahassee, FL
NCAA Tournament
November 14; 5:00 p.m., ESPN+	(3) No. 6	Samford; First Round	W 4–0	11–2–4	Seminole Soccer Complex (1,517); Tallahassee, FL
November 20; 2:00 p.m., ESPN+	(3) No. 6	vs. Lipscomb; Second Round	W 1–0	12–2–4	Shaw Field (413); Washington, D.C.
November 23; 12:00 p.m., ESPN+	(3) No. 6	at (2) No. 10 Georgetown; Third Round	W 3–1	13–2–4	Shaw Field (1,625); Washington, D.C.
November 28; 5:00 p.m., ESPN+	(3) No. 6	Ohio State; Quarterfinal	W 4–1	14–2–4	Seminole Soccer Complex (2,408); Tallahassee, FL
December 5; 6:00 p.m., ESPNU	(3) No. 6	vs. (2) No. 5 TCU; Semifinal	W 1–0	15–2–4	CPKC Stadium (7,066); Kansas City, MO
December 8; 7:00 p.m., ESPNU	(3) No. 6	vs. (1) No. 1 Stanford; Final	W 1–0	16–2–4	CPKC Stadium (3,311); Kansas City, MO
*Non-conference game. ^{#}Rankings from United Soccer Coaches. (#) Tournament seedings in parentheses. All times are in Eastern.

== Awards and honors ==
Recipient	Award	Date	Ref.
Jordynn Dudley	Pre-season All-ACC Team	August 7	
Heather Gilchrist	Pre-season All-ACC Team	August 7	
Jordynn Dudley	Top Drawer Soccer Preseason Best XI First Team	August 12	
Yuna McCormack	Top Drawer Soccer Preseason Best XI Second Team	August 12	
Heather Gilchrist	Top Drawer Soccer Preseason Best XI Third Team	August 12	
Jordynn Dudley	Hermann Trophy Preseason Watchlist	August 14	
Heather Gilchrist	Hermann Trophy Preseason Watchlist	August 14	
Janet Okeke	ACC Defensive Player of the Week – Week 5	September 16	
Jordynn Dudley	ACC Co-Offensive Player of the Week – Week 11	October 28	
Jordynn Dudley	All-ACC First Team	November 5	
Wrianna Hudson	All-ACC Second Team	November 5	
Taylor Suarez	All-ACC Second Team	November 5	
Heather Gilchrist	All-ACC Third Team	November 5	
Mimi Van Zanten	All-ACC Third Team	November 5	
Jordynn Dudley	National Player of the Year finalist	November 28	
Jordynn Dudley	All-Atlantic Region First Team	December 2	
Taylor Suarez	All-Atlantic Region First Team	December 2	
Heather Gilchrist	All-Atlantic Region Second Team	December 2	
Mimi Van Zanten	All-Atlantic Region Second Team	December 2	
Wrianna Hudson	All-Atlantic Region Fourth Team	December 2	
Jordynn Dudley	United Soccer First Team All-American	December 5	
Taylor Suarez	United Soccer Second Team All-American	December 5	
Heather Gilchrist	United Soccer Third Team All-American	December 5	
Taylor Suarez	All-Tournament Team	December 8	
Heather Gilchrist	All-Tournament Team	December 8	
Peyton McGovern	All-Tournament Team	December 8	
Wrianna Hudson	College Cup Most Outstanding Player (Offensive)	December 8	
Kate Ockene	College Cup Most Outstanding Player (Defensive)	December 8	
Jordynn Dudley	Hermann Trophy finalist	December 10	
Jordynn Dudley	First Team Best XI	December 16	
Taylor Suarez	Second Team Best XI	December 16	
Wrianna Hudson	Third Team Best XI	December 16	
Brian Pensky, Bobby Shuttleworth, Micah Bledsoe, Erwin van Bennekom	National Coaching Staff of the Year	December 19	
Jordynn Dudley	Honda Sports Award winner	January 13	

== Rankings ==
Ranking movements Legend: ██ Increase in ranking ██ Decrease in ranking т = Tied with team above or below ( ) = First-place votes
	Week																
Poll	Pre	1	2	3	4	5	6	7	8	9	10	11	12	13	14	15	Final
United Soccer	3	3 (2)	6 т	7	7	7	6	6	5	7	11	6	6	Not released			1 (7)
TopDrawer Soccer	4	2	2	6	2	2	6	6	5	5	9	5	6	7	7	5	1
