= North Carolina Tar Heels women's soccer =

American college soccer team

- 2025 North Carolina Tar Heels women's soccer team
- Founded: 1979; 47 years ago
- University: University of North Carolina at Chapel Hill
- Head coach: Damon Nahas (3rd season)
- Conference: ACC
- Location: Chapel Hill, North Carolina, US
- Stadium: Dorrance Field (capacity: 4,200)
- Nickname: Tar Heels
- Colors: Carolina blue and white
Home	Away

NCAA tournament championships
- 1982, 1983, 1984, 1986, 1987, 1988, 1989, 1990, 1991, 1992, 1993, 1994, 1996, 1997, 1999, 2000, 2003, 2006, 2008, 2009, 2012, 2024

NCAA tournament runner-up
- 1985, 1998, 2001, 2018, 2019, 2022

NCAA tournament Semifinals
- 1982, 1983, 1984, 1985, 1986, 1987, 1988, 1989, 1990, 1991, 1992, 1993, 1994, 1995, 1996, 1997, 1998, 1999, 2000, 2001, 2002, 2003, 2006, 2008, 2009, 2012, 2016, 2018, 2019, 2020, 2022, 2024

NCAA tournament appearances
- 1982, 1983, 1984, 1985, 1986, 1987, 1988, 1989, 1990, 1991, 1992, 1993, 1994, 1995, 1996, 1997, 1998, 1999, 2000, 2001, 2002, 2003, 2004, 2005, 2006, 2007, 2008, 2009, 2010, 2011, 2012, 2013, 2014, 2015, 2016, 2017, 2018, 2019, 2020, 2021, 2022, 2023, 2024, 2025

Conference tournament championships
- 1989, 1990, 1991, 1992, 1993, 1994, 1995, 1996, 1997, 1998, 1999, 2000, 2001, 2002, 2003, 2005, 2006, 2007, 2008, 2009, 2017, 2019, 2026

Conference regular season championships
- 1987, 1989, 1990, 1991, 1992, 1993, 1995, 1996, 1997, 1998, 1999, 2001, 2002, 2003, 2004, 2005, 2006, 2007, 2008, 2010, 2014, 2018, 2019, 2020, 2022

The North Carolina Tar Heels women's soccer team represents the University of North Carolina at Chapel Hill in the Atlantic Coast Conference, which is part of NCAA Division I soccer.

North Carolina is one of the most successful women's college soccer teams, having won 22 of the 36 Atlantic Coast Conference championships, and 23 of the 43 NCAA national championships. The team has participated in every NCAA tournament.

== History ==
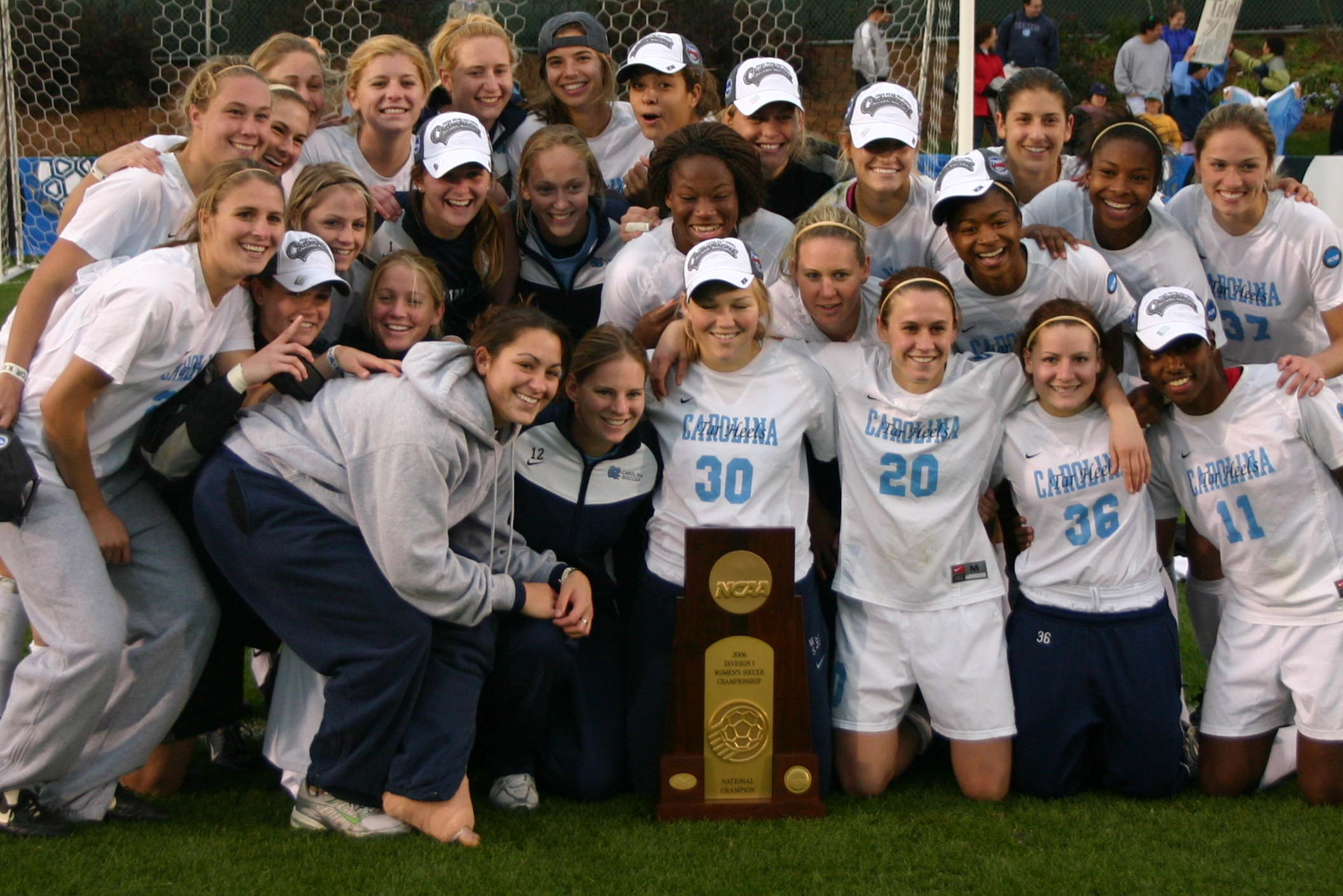
North Carolina Tar Heels celebrate winning the 2006 Women's College Cup

The UNC women's soccer team began as a club team established by students looking for high level competition. In 1979, they petitioned the UNC Athletic Director, Bill Cobey, to take the club to the varsity level. Cobey asked Anson Dorrance, then the UNC men's soccer coach to assess the club's ability to transition to varsity status. Dorrance was impressed enough by the club, then coached by Mike Byers, to recommend that the school form a women's soccer team. Cobey agreed and hired Dorrance as head coach, with Byers as an assistant, for the 1978 season. That year, the Tar Heels played an essentially club schedule, including games against high school teams. However, in 1979, the Association for Intercollegiate Athletics for Women, at the prompting of Dorrance and University of Colorado coach, Chris Lidstone, established a national women's soccer program.

At the time, UNC had the only varsity women's soccer team in the Southeast and this allowed Dorrance to recruit the top talent in the region. In 1981, eight of those recruits won starting positions and took the team to the AIAW national championship.

== Players ==
=== Current roster ===
As of November 15, 2026

Note: Flags indicate national team as defined under FIFA eligibility rules; some limited exceptions apply. Players may hold more than one non-FIFA nationality.

No.	Pos.	Nation	Player
0	GK	JAM	Liya Brooks
1	GK	GER	Hannah Johann
2	DF	USA	Cali O'Neill
3	FW	USA	Jenny Dearie
4	DF	USA	Aven Alvarez
5	FW	USA	Maggie Currie
6	MF	USA	Riley Kennedy
7	FW	USA	Sealey Strawn
8	DF	USA	Bella Gaetino
9	DF	USA	Hope Munson
10	MF	USA	Bella Devey
11	GK	USA	Peyton Trayer
12	MF	USA	Lilliah Blum
13	MF	USA	Summer Denigan
14	FW	USA	Amari Manning
15	MF	COL	Ella Martínez

No.	Pos.	Nation	Player
16	DF	USA	Camie Maynor
17	DF	USA	Caitlin Mara
18	MF	USA	Lauren Malsom
19	FW	USA	Leah Kuklick
20	MF	USA	Ashley Pennie
21	FW	USA	Samantha Rich
22	FW	USA	Deus Stanislaus
23	DF	USA	Raegan Williams
24	DF	USA	Izzi Stratton
25	FW	USA	Logan Tongberg
26	MF	USA	Scottie Antonucci
27	FW	USA	Wylie Roossien
31	MF	USA	Ella Smith
32	DF	USA	Chloe Shroff
40	GK	USA	Abby Gundry
43	MF	USA	Shaela Bradley

== All-time record ==
Year	Head coach	Overall	ACC	ACC tourn.	NCAA tourn.
1979	Anson Dorrance	10–2–0	–	–	–
1980	Anson Dorrance	21–5–0	–	–	AIAW Semifinals
1981	Anson Dorrance	23–0–0	–	–	AIAW Champions
1982	Anson Dorrance	19–2–0	–	–	Champions
1983	Anson Dorrance	19–1–0	–	–	Champions
1984	Anson Dorrance	24–0–1	–	–	Champions
1985	Anson Dorrance	18–2–1	–	–	Runner up
1986	Anson Dorrance	24–0–1	–	–	Champions
1987	Anson Dorrance	23–0–1	3–0–0	–	Champions
1988	Anson Dorrance	18–0–3	1–0–1	Runner up	Champions
1989	Anson Dorrance	24–0–1	4–0–0	Champions	Champions
1990	Anson Dorrance	20–1–1	4–0–0	Champions	Champions
1991	Anson Dorrance	24–0–0	4–0–0	Champions	Champions
1992	Anson Dorrance	25–0–0	4–0–0	Champions	Champions
1993	Anson Dorrance	23–0–0	4–0–0	Champions	Champions
1994	Anson Dorrance	25–1–1	5–1–0	Champions	Champions
1995	Anson Dorrance	25–1–0	7–0–0	Champions	Semifinals
1996	Anson Dorrance	25–1–0	7–0–0	Champions	Champions
1997	Anson Dorrance	27–0–1	7–0–0	Champions	Champions
1998	Anson Dorrance	25–1–0	7–0–0	Champions	Runner up
1999	Anson Dorrance	24–2–0	7–0–0	Champions	Champions
2000	Anson Dorrance	21–3–0	4–3–0	Champions	Champions
2001	Anson Dorrance	24–1–0	7–0–0	Champions	Runner up
2002	Anson Dorrance	21–2–4	4–1–2	Champions	Semifinals
2003	Anson Dorrance	27–0–0	7–0–0	Champions	Champions
2004	Anson Dorrance	20–1–2	9–0–0	Runner up	Third round
2005	Anson Dorrance	23–1–1	9–1–0	Champions	Quarterfinals
2006	Anson Dorrance	27–1–0	10–0–0	Champions	Champions
2007	Anson Dorrance	19–4–1	9–1–0	Champions	Third round
2008	Anson Dorrance	25–1–2	9–0–1	Champions	Champions
2009	Anson Dorrance	23–3–1	9–3–0	Champions	Champions
2010	Anson Dorrance	19–3–2	9–3–0	Semifinals	Third round
2011	Anson Dorrance	13–5–2	6–3–1	Quarterfinals	Third round
2012	Anson Dorrance	15–5–3	6–3–1	Quarterfinals	Champions
2013	Anson Dorrance	20–5–0	10–3–0	Semifinals	Quarterfinals
2014	Anson Dorrance	14–4–2	9–0–1	Semifinals	Third round
2015	Anson Dorrance	15–5–1	7–3–0	Semifinals	Second round
2016	Anson Dorrance	17–4–4	6–2–2	Runner up	Semifinals
2017	Anson Dorrance	17–3–2	8–0–2	Champions	Third round
2018	Anson Dorrance	21–4–2	10–0–0	Runner up	Runner up
2019	Anson Dorrance	24–1–2	9–0–1	Champions	Runner up
2020	Anson Dorrance	18–2–0	8–0–0	Runner up	Semifinals
2021	Anson Dorrance	12–3–3	5–2–3	—	First round
2022	Anson Dorrance	20–5–1	8–2–0	Runner up	Runner up
2023	Anson Dorrance	13–2–8	5–0–5	Quarterfinals	Quarterfinals
2024	Damon Nahas	22–5–0	7–3–0	Runner up	Champions
2025	Damon Nahas	13–6–2	6–4–0	—	Third round

== Team Honours ==
=== National ===
- NCAA Division I tournament (22): 1982, 1983, 1984, 1986, 1987, 1988, 1989, 1990, 1991, 1992, 1993, 1994, 1996, 1997, 1999, 2000, 2003, 2006, 2008, 2009, 2012, 2024

=== Conference ===
- Atlantic Coast tournament (22): 1989, 1990, 1991, 1992, 1993, 1994, 1995, 1996, 1997, 1998, 1999, 2000, 2001, 2002, 2003, 2005, 2006, 2007, 2008, 2009, 2017, 2019

== Individual honors ==
=== National Coach of the Year ===
- Anson Dorrance – 1982, 1986, 1997, 2000, 2001, 2003, 2006

=== ACC Coach of the Year ===
- Anson Dorrance – 1982, 1986, 1987, 1990, 1991, 1993, 1996, 2001, 2003, 2004, 2006, 2008, 2018, 2019

=== Hermann Trophy ===
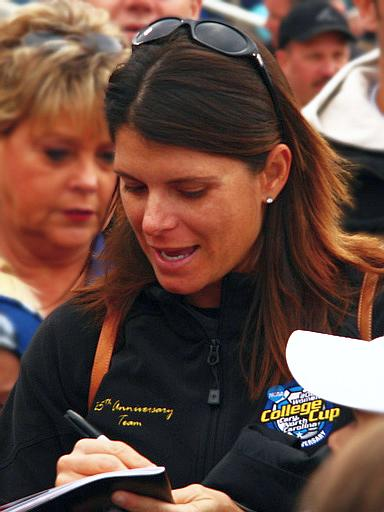
Mia Hamm won numerous awards with the Tar Heels

- Shannon Higgins – 1989
- Kristine Lilly – 1991
- Mia Hamm – 1992, 1993
- Tisha Venturini – 1994
- Cindy Parlow – 1997, 1998
- Cat Reddick – 2003
- Crystal Dunn – 2012
- Kate Faasse – 2024

=== ACC Player of the Year ===
- Lori Henry – 1987
- Shannon Higgins – 1989
- Mia Hamm – 1990, 1992, 1993
- Kristine Lilly – 1991
- Tisha Venturini – 1994
- Cindy Parlow – 1998
- Lorrie Fair – 1999
- Lindsay Tarpley – 2003

=== ACC Defensive Player of the Year ===
- Whitney Engen – 2009
- Crystal Dunn – 2013

=== ACC Offensive Player of the Year ===
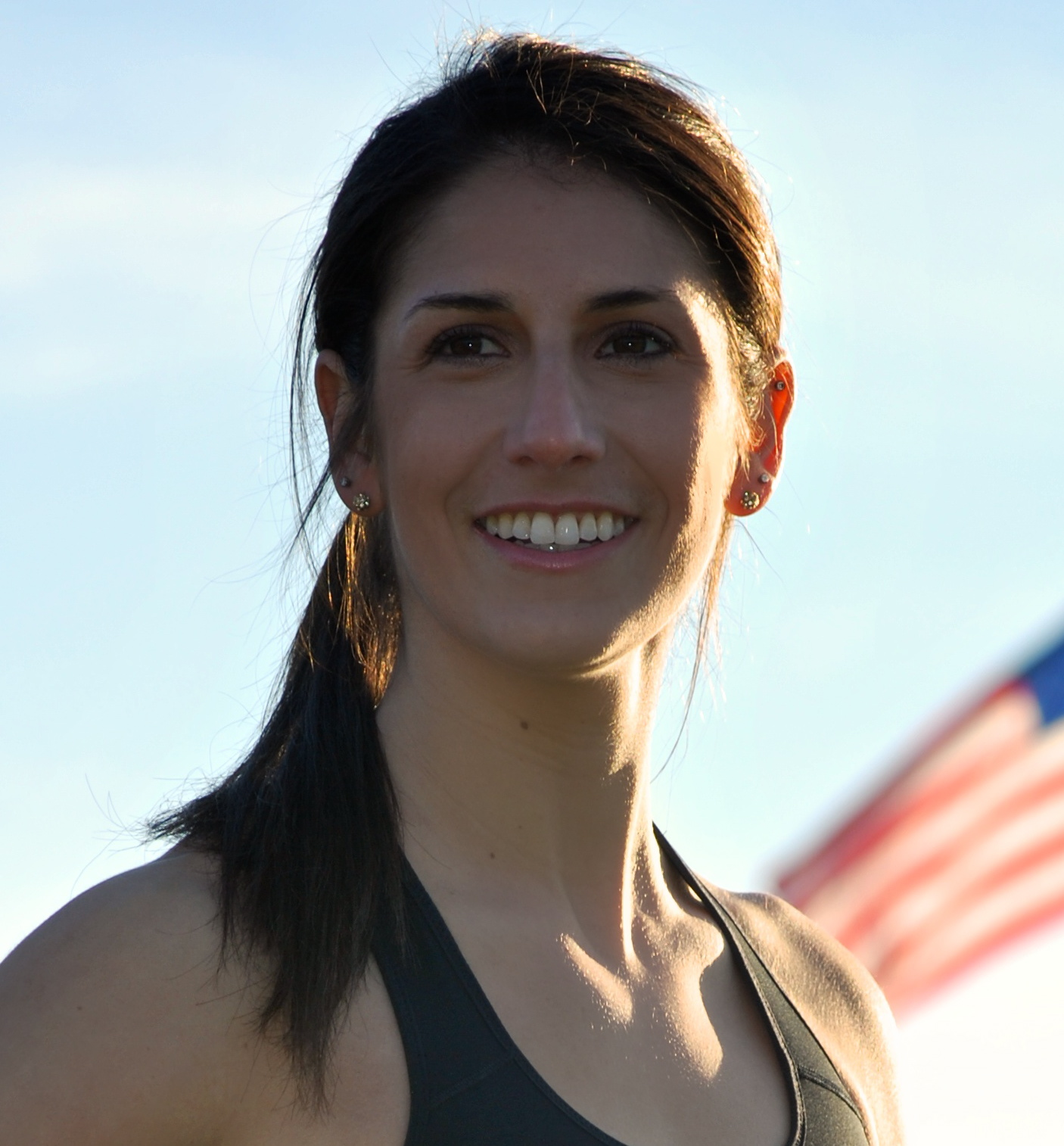
Yael Averbuch, ACC Defensive Player of the Year in 2006

- Heather O'Reilly – 2005
- Yael Averbuch – 2006
- Casey Noguiera – 2008
- Crystal Dunn – 2013
- Alessia Russo – 2018

=== ACC Midfielder of the Year ===
- Ally Sentnor – 2023

=== ACC Rookie of the Year ===
- Tisha Venturini – 1991
- Debbie Keller – 1993
- Cindy Parlow – 1995
- Laurie Schwoy – 1996
- Lindsay Tarpley – 2002
- Megan Buckingham – 2014
- Bridgette Andrzejewski – 2016
- Alessia Russo – 2017
- Maycee Bell - 2019

=== NCAA Tournament MVP ===
- April Heinrichs – 1984 (last year overall MVP named)

=== Offensive Player of the NCAA Tournament ===
- April Heinrichs – 1985, 1986
- Kristine Lilly – 1989, 1990
- Mia Hamm – 1992, 1993
- Tisha Venturini – 1994
- Debbie Keller – 1996
- Robin Confer – 1997
- Susan Bush – 1999
- Meredith Florance – 2000
- Heather O'Reilly – 2003, 2006
- Kealia Ohai – 2012
- Olivia Thomas – 2024

=== Defensive Player of the Tournament ===
- Suzy Cobb – 1983
- Carla Overbeck – 1988
- Tracy Bates – 1989
- Tisha Venturini – 1991
- Staci Wilson – 1994
- Nel Fettig – 1996
- Siri Mullinix – 1997
- Lorrie Fair – 1999
- Cat Reddick – 2000, 2003
- Robyn Gayle – 2006
- Satara Murray – 2012
- Clare Gagne – 2024

=== First Team All-America Selection ===
As of 2011, North Carolina had 70 players gain first-team All-American recognition. The next two schools with the greatest number of All-Americans were tied with twenty-two each.

=== Retired numbers ===
19 – (United States) Mia Hamm, forward, 1989–1993. Number retired in 1994^{1}.

- ^{1} Although the university retired Hamm's #19 in 1994, it was later unretired and given to other players since.

== Notable alumnae ==
- Emily Pickering
- Tisha Venturini
- Mia Hamm
- Sarina Wiegman
- Kristine Lilly
- Heather O'Reilly
- Meghan Klingenberg
- Lori Chalupny
- Whitney Engen
- Lucy Bronze
- Katie Bowen
- Tobin Heath
- Crystal Dunn
- Kendall Fletcher
- Ashlyn Harris
- Allie Long
- Jessica McDonald
- Lotte Wubben-Moy
- Alessia Russo
- Meredith Florance
- Lois Joel
- Emily Fox
- Rosalind Berhalter
