= 2025 Wake Forest Demon Deacons women's soccer team =

American college soccer season

2025 Wake Forest Demon Deacons women's soccer

NCAA Tournament, Second Round
- Conference: Atlantic Coast Conference
- U. Soc. Coaches poll: No. RV
- Record: 11–5–4 (4–3–3 ACC)
- Head coach: Tony da Luz (29th season)
- Associate head coach: Brittany Cameron (6th season)
- Assistant coaches: Courtney Drummond (4th season); Taylor Culp (2nd season)
- Home stadium: Spry Stadium

2025 ACC women's soccer standings
	Conf.						Overall
Team	W		L		T	PCT	W		L		T	PCT
No. 2 Stanford ‍†‍‡‍^{y}	9	–	0	–	1	.950	21	–	2	–	2	.880
No. 11 Notre Dame ‍‍‍^{y}	8	–	1	–	1	.850	15	–	2	–	3	.825
No. 3 Duke ‍‍‍^{y}	7	–	3	–	0	.700	17	–	5	–	1	.761
No. 1 Florida State ‍‍‍^{y}	6	–	2	–	2	.700	16	–	2	–	4	.818
No. 8 Virginia ‍‍‍^{y}	6	–	2	–	2	.700	14	–	3	–	5	.750
No. 24 Louisville ‍‍‍^{y}	6	–	2	–	2	.700	13	–	5	–	3	.690
No. 13т North Carolina ‍‍‍^{y}	6	–	4	–	0	.600	13	–	6	–	2	.667
California ‍‍‍	4	–	2	–	4	.600	8	–	3	–	8	.632
Wake Forest ‍‍‍^{y}	4	–	3	–	3	.550	11	–	5	–	4	.650
NC State ‍‍‍	4	–	4	–	2	.500	5	–	9	–	4	.389
Clemson ‍‍‍^{y}	4	–	4	–	2	.500	8	–	6	–	5	.553
SMU ‍‍‍	2	–	6	–	2	.300	8	–	8	–	2	.500
Pittsburgh ‍‍‍	2	–	8	–	0	.200	6	–	10	–	2	.389
Miami (FL) ‍‍‍	1	–	7	–	2	.200	7	–	8	–	3	.472
Boston College ‍‍‍	1	–	7	–	2	.200	5	–	8	–	5	.417
Syracuse ‍‍‍	1	–	8	–	1	.150	5	–	9	–	4	.389
Virginia Tech ‍‍‍	0	–	8	–	2	.100	4	–	10	–	4	.333
† – Conference champion ‡ – 2025 ACC Tournament champion y – Invited to the NCAA Tournament; As of December 9, 2025; Rankings from United Soccer Coaches Poll; Source: The ACC

The 2025 Wake Forest Demon Deacons women's soccer team represented Wake Forest University during the 2025 NCAA Division I women's soccer season. The Demon Deacons were led by head coach Tony da Luz, in his twenty-ninth season. They played their home games at Spry Stadium in Winston-Salem, North Carolina. This was the team's 31st season playing organized women's college soccer, all of which have been played in the Atlantic Coast Conference.

The Deamon Deacons began the season ranked tenth in the United Soccer Coaches poll and won their first three games without conceding a goal. Two of the three games were against Power 4 opponents in SMU and LSU. Their first loss game on August 24 against Mississippi State. The loss saw them fall to nineteenth in the polls. They won their next two games and tied Brown before opening ACC play against Miami (FL). They defeated Miami and finished their non-conference season with a 6–2 victory over USC Upstate. That saw the team ranked sixteenth before going fully into ACC play. They defeated Virginia Tech and ninth-ranked Duke but drew Boston College over their next three games. The defeat of Duke saw them rise to twelfth in the rankings, but they then lost to NC State, and Clemson while drawing Louisville. This run of results saw them drop out of the rankings. They went 1–1–1 in their last three games, defeating Pittsburgh, drawing top-ranked Notre Dame, and finishing their season with a loss to fifth-ranked Florida State.

The Demon Deacons finished the regular season 10–4–4 overall and 4–3–3 in ACC ACC play to finish in ninth place. They did not qualify for the ACC Tournament. They received an at-large invitation to the NCAA Tournament. They were selected as the seventh seed in the Stanford Bracket. They defeated South Carolina in the First Round before losing to second seed and ninth-ranked Michigan State in the Second Round to end their season.

== Previous season ==
The Demon Deacons finished the regular season 12–3–2 overall and 7–2–1 in ACC ACC play to finish in a tie for second place. As the third seed in the ACC Tournament they earned a bye to the Semifinals where they met third seed and sixth ranked Florida State. The game was closer than it was in the regular season and Florida State prevailed in a penalty shoot-out. They received an at-large invitation to the NCAA Tournament. They were selected as the second seed in the Southern California Bracket. They defeated Morehead State in the First Round, Colorado in the Second Round, and third-seed and tenth ranked Ohio State in the Round of 16. They traveled to Southern California to face the first seed and fourth ranked Trojans in the Quarterfinals. Wake Forest prevailed in a penalty shoot-out to advance to the Semifinals. There they faced regular season opponent Stanford, and again won 1–0. They faced another regular season foe in the Final, North Carolina. The Demon Deacons again could not defeat the Tar Heels and finished as runners-up. Their final record was 16–4–4.

== Offseason ==
=== Departures ===
Departures
Name	Number	Pos.	Height	Year	Hometown	Reason for departure
Paige Nurkin	0	GK	6'0"	Graduate Student	Charlotte, North Carolina	Graduated
Emily Colton	3	MF	5'3"	Senior	Carlsbad, California	Graduated; signed professional contract with DC Power FC
Nikayla Small	4	MF	5'2"	Senior	Pickering, Canada	Graduated; signed professional contract with AFC Toronto
Kristin Johnson	7	DF	5'9"	Senior	Reykjavík, Iceland	Graduated
Caiya Hanks	9	FW	5'4"	Junior	Kailua-Kona, Hawaii	Signed professional contract with Portland Thorns FC
Malaika Meena	10	MF	5'6"	Senior	Slough, England	Graduated
Emily Morris	13	MF	5'8"	Senior	Fort Mill, South Carolina	Graduated; signed professional contract with Carolina Ascent FC
Tyla Ochoa	17	DF	5'5"	Senior	Encinitas, California	Graduated
Kate Dobsch	18	DF	5'9"	Senior	Winnetka, Illinois	Graduated
Josie Noble	22	MF	5'8"	Freshman	Wilmette, Illinois	—
Zara Chavoshi	24	DF	5'8"	Senior	Potomac, Maryland	Graduated; signed professional contract with Orlando Pride
Nadia DeMarinis	27	DF	5'7"	Senior	Boca Raton, Florida	Graduated
Olivia DeMarinis	29	DF	5'7"	Senior	Boca Raton, Florida	Graduated
Anna Swanson	30	MF	5'4"	Senior	Santa Fe, New Mexico	Graduated
Olivia Duvall	31	FW	5'7"	Senior	Alexandria, Virginia	Graduated
Emily Silva	32	MF	5'4"	Senior	Greensboro, North Carolina	Graduated
Abbie Colton	33	MF	5'3"	Senior	Carlsbad, California	Graduated
Laurel Ansbrow	34	DF	5'11"	Senior	Cary, North Carolina	Graduated; signed professional contract with Fort Lauderdale United FC
Emily Murphy	35	FW	5'6"	Senior	Windsor, England	Graduated; signed professional contract with Newcastle United
Payton Cahill	88	GK	5'8"	Senior	Cottage Grove, Minnesota	Graduated

=== Incoming transfers ===
Incoming transfers
Name	Number	Pos.	Height	Year	Hometown	Previous school
Addison Roberts	3	DF	5'9"	Junior	Edmond, Oklahoma	Oklahoma State
Brooke Miller	10	MF	5'7"	Senior	San Diego, California	Portland
Victoria Coninck	33	GK	5'7"	Graduate Student	San Ramon, California	George Mason

=== Recruiting class ===
Name	Nationality	Hometown	Club	TDS Rating
Sonoma Bever; FW	(United States)	Madison, Wisconsin	SC Wave	3/5 stars
Allie Flanagan; FW	(United States)	Round Hill, Virginia	Virginia Development Academy	4/5 stars
Alejandra Gomez; MF	(Spain)	Madrid, Spain	Real Madrid	N/A
Zaiba Ishaque; DF	(England)	Manchester, England	Manchester United	N/A
Aislynn Maguire; FW	(United States)	Winston-Salem, North Carolina	NC Fusion	3/5 stars
Kylie Maxwell; FW	(United States)	Langhorne, Pennsylvania	Philadelphia Ukrainian Nationals	4/5 stars
Alicia Meincke; MF	(United States)	Ashburn, Virginia	Fairfax Virginia Union	3/5 stars
Elliana Ramirez; FW	(United States)	Dallas, Texas	DKSC (ECNL)	3/5 stars
Sydney Schuler; MF	(United States)	Rancho Mission Viejo, California	San Diego Surf	3/5 stars
Elizabeth Thornton; GK	(United States)	Purcellville, Virginia	Northern Virginia Alliance	3/5 stars
Jordan Turner; DF	(United States)	Ashburn, Virginia	Northern Virginia Alliance	3/5 stars
Rachael Wright; DF	(United States)	Grand Rapids, Michigan	Nationals	3/5 stars
Tahlia Zadeyan; DF	(United States)	San Diego, California	DCMV Sharks	3/5 stars

== Squad ==
=== Roster ===
As of February 2, 2026

Note: Flags indicate national team as defined under FIFA eligibility rules; some limited exceptions apply. Players may hold more than one non-FIFA nationality.

No.	Pos.	Nation	Player
0	GK	USA	Lizzie Thornton
1	GK	USA	Valentina Amaral
2	MF	USA	Amaya Dawkins
3	DF	USA	Addison Roberts
4	DF	USA	Tahlia Zadeyan
5	DF	USA	MJ Osborne
6	MF	USA	Dempsey Brown
7	MF	ESP	Alejandra Goemz
8	FW	USA	Chloe Burst
9	FW	USA	Elliana Ramirez
10	MF	USA	Brooke Miller
11	FW	USA	Sonoma Bever
12	FW	USA	Aislynn Maguire
13	DF	USA	Rachel Wright
14	MF	USA	Lola Ressler
15	DF	USA	Jordan Turner

No.	Pos.	Nation	Player
16	FW	USA	Alex Wood
17	FW	ENG	Zaiba Ishaque
18	FW	USA	Allie Flanagan
19	FW	USA	Sierra Sythe
20	FW	USA	Hannah Johnson
21	DF	USA	Sammi Wiemann
23	DF	USA	Allie Schmidt
24	MF	USA	Sydney Schuler
25	MF	USA	Sophie Faircloth
26	DF	USA	Taryn Chance
27	MF	USA	Alicia Meincke
28	MF	USA	Carly Wilson
31	FW	USA	Kylie Maxwell
33	GK	USA	Victoria Conick
39	DF	USA	Laine DeNatale

=== Team management ===
Position	Staff
Head coach	Tony da Luz
Associate Head Coach	Brittany Cameron
Assistant Coach	Courtney Drummond
Assistant Coach	Taylor Culp

== Schedule ==
Date Time, TV	Rank^{#}	Opponent^{#}	Result	Record	Site City, State
Exhibition
August 6*; 6:00 p.m.	No. 10	No. 15 Virginia	None Reported	—	Spry Stadium; Winston-Salem, NC
August 9*; 6:00 p.m.	No. 10	at No. 1 North Carolina	None Reported	—	Dorrance Field; Chapel Hill, NC
Regular Season
August 14*; 7:00 p.m., ACCNX	No. 10	SMU	W 2–0	1–0–0	Spry Stadium (467); Winston-Salem, NC
August 17*; 1:00 p.m., ACCN	No. 10	LSU	W 1–0	2–0–0	Spry Stadium (578); Winston-Salem, NC
August 21*; 5:00 p.m., ACCNX	No. 10	Villanova	W 2–0	3–0–0	Spry Stadium (1,975); Winston-Salem, NC
August 24*; 6:30 p.m., SECN	No. 10	at Mississippi State	L 1–2	3–1–0	MSU Soccer Field (1,454); Starkville, MS
August 28*; 8:00 p.m., ACCNX	No. 19	USF	W 1–0	4–1–0	Spry Stadium (1,279); Winston-Salem, NC
September 4*; 7:00 p.m., FloCollege	No. 17	at College of Charleston	W 2–0	5–1–0	Patriots Point Athletics Complex (112); Mount Pleasant, SC
September 7*; 12:00 p.m., ACCNX	No. 17	Brown	T 1–1	5–1–1	Spry Stadium (1,000); Winston-Salem, NC
September 10; 8:00 p.m., ACCN	No. 18	Miami (FL)	W 3–1	6–1–1 (1–0–0)	Spry Stadium (506); Winston-Salem, NC
September 14*; 1:00 p.m., ACCNX	No. 18	USC Upstate	W 6–2	7–1–1	Spry Stadium (483); Winston-Salem, NC
September 18; 7:00 p.m., ACCNX	No. 16	Virginia Tech	W 2–1	8–1–1 (2–0–0)	Spry Stadium (773); Winston-Salem, NC
September 21; 1:00 p.m., ACCNX	No. 16	at Boston College	T 0–0	8–1–2 (2–0–1)	Newton Campus Soccer Field (675); Chestnut Hill, MA
September 25; 7:00 p.m., ACCNX	No. 19	at No. 9 Duke	W 3–2	9–1–2 (3–0–1)	Koskinen Stadium (484); Durham, NC
October 2; 7:00 p.m., ACCN	No. 12	at NC State	L 1–2	9–2–2 (3–1–1)	Dail Soccer Field (1,001); Raleigh, NC
October 9; 7:00 p.m., ACCNX	No. 13	Louisville	T 1–1	9–2–3 (3–1–2)	Spry Stadium (543); Winston-Salem, NC
October 16; 7:00 p.m., ACCN	No. 17т	at Clemson	L 0–1	9–3–3 (3–2–2)	Riggs Field (735); Clemson, SC
October 23; 7:00 p.m., ACCNX		Pittsburgh	W 2–1	10–3–3 (4–2–2)	Spry Stadium (690); Winston-Salem, NC
October 26; 2:00 p.m., ACCNX		No. 1 Notre Dame	T 1–1	10–3–4 (4–2–3)	Spry Stadium (746); Winston-Salem, NC
October 30; 6:00 p.m., ACCN		at No. 5 Florida State	L 1–4	10–4–4 (4–3–3)	Seminole Soccer Complex (1,109); Tallahassee, FL
NCAA Tournament
November 14*; 6:00 p.m., ESPN+	(7)	South Carolina; First Round	W 2–1	11–4–4	Spry Stadium (1,824); Winston-Salem, NC
November 20*; 6:00 p.m., ESPN+	(7)	at (2) No. 9 Michigan State; Second Round	L 0–1	11–5–4	DeMartin Soccer Complex (1,247); East Lansing, MI
*Non-conference game. ^{#}Rankings from United Soccer Coaches. (#) Tournament seedings in parentheses.

== Awards and honors ==
Recipient	Award	Date	Ref.
Allie Flanagan	Top Drawer Soccer Preseason Best XI Freshman Team	August 12	
Valentina Amaral	ACC Co-Defensive Player of the Week – Week 1	August 19	
Kylie Maxwell	ACC Co-Offensive Player of the Week – Week 7	September 30	
Kylie Maxwell	ACC Freshman of the Year	November 5	
Valentina Amaral	All-ACC Third Team	November 5	
Kylie Maxwell	All-ACC Third Team	November 5	
Allie Flanagan	ACC All-Freshman Team	November 5	
Kylie Maxwell	ACC All-Freshman Team	November 5	

== Rankings ==
Ranking movements Legend: ██ Increase in ranking ██ Decrease in ranking — = Not ranked RV = Received votes т = Tied with team above or below
	Week																
Poll	Pre	1	2	3	4	5	6	7	8	9	10	11	12	13	14	15	Final
United Soccer	10	10	19	17	18	16	19	12	13	17т	RV	RV	RV	Not released			RV
TopDrawer Soccer	18	17	20	24	25	20	22	12	20	18	—	—	—	—	—	—	—
