= Damon Nahas =

American soccer coach (born 1974)

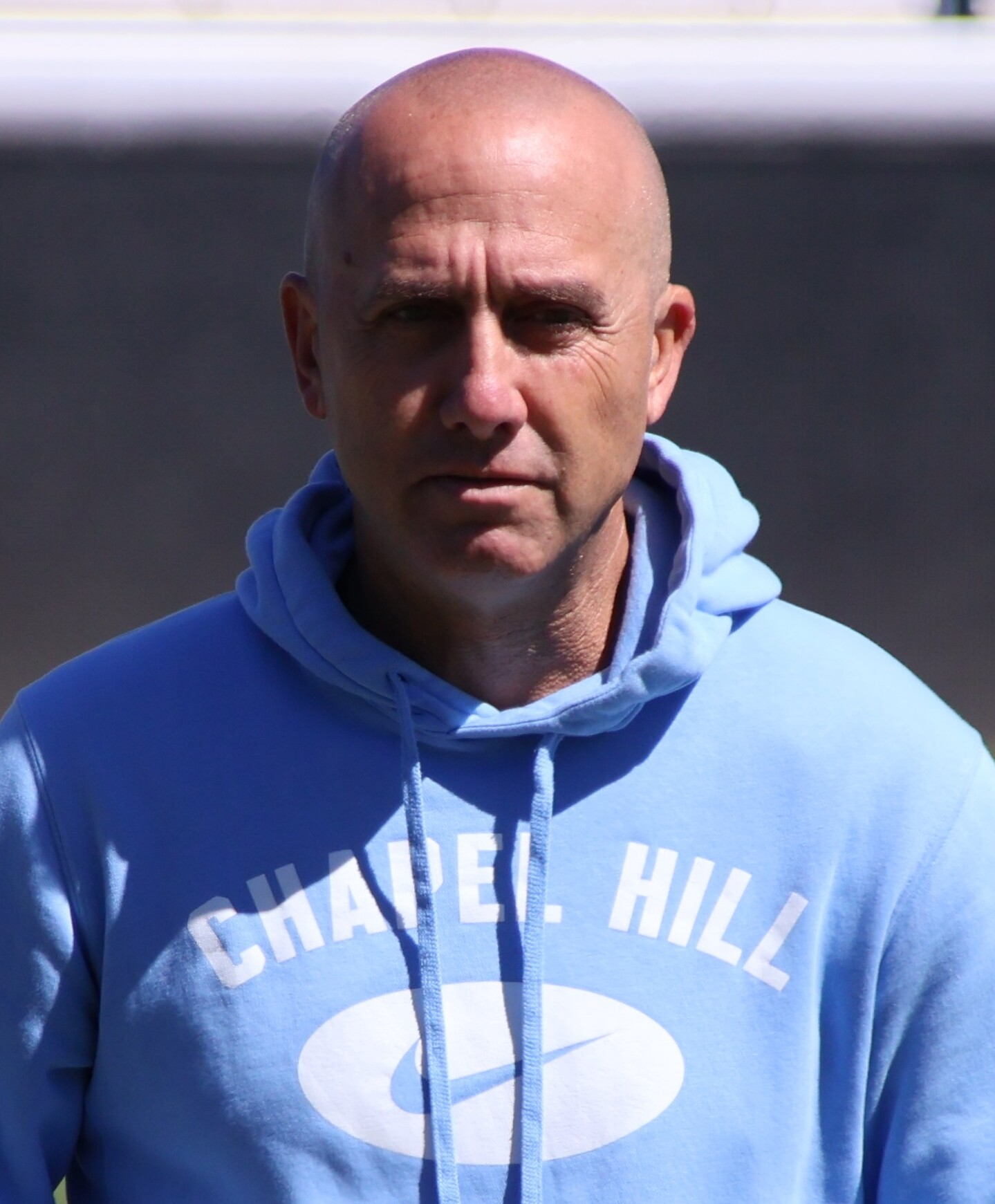
- Nahas with North Carolina in 2026

Personal information
- Date of birth: 1974 (age 51–52)

Team information
- Current team: North Carolina Tar Heels (head coach)

College career
Years	Team	Apps	(Gls)
1992–1996	NC State Wolfpack		

Senior career*
Years	Team	Apps	(Gls)
- Wilmington Hammerheads
- Raleigh Capital Express

Managerial career
- 1999–2002: Cardinal Gibbons
- Cary Clarets
- 2007–2009: Carolina Railhawks (assistant)
- 2011–2014: USYNT U-15
- 2014: USYNT U-17 (assistant)
- 2015–2021: North Carolina Tar Heels (assistant)
- 2021–2024: North Carolina Tar Heels (associate)
- 2024–: North Carolina Tar Heels
- * Club domestic league appearances and goals

Damon Nahas (born 1974) is an American college soccer coach who is the head coach of the North Carolina Tar Heels women's soccer team. He led North Carolina to the 2024 national championship in his first season as head coach, being named the United Soccer Coaches College Coach of the Year.

== Career ==
Nahas was raised in East Northport, New York, and played college soccer for the NC State Wolfpack from 1992 to 1996. He played professionally for the Wilmington Hammerheads and Raleigh Capital Express.

Nahas founded the youth development program Next Level Academy in Cary, North Carolina, in 2000. He also became technical director for the Capital Area Soccer League in Raleigh that year. He was the coach of teams including the boys' team at Cardinal Gibbons High School, USL-1 club Carolina RailHawks (assistant), and USL PDL club Cary Clarets. He worked for the United States Soccer Federation as the head coach of the girls' national under-15 team from 2011 to 2014; he was also an assistant for the under-17 team and select senior national team camps in 2014.

Nahas was hired as an assistant coach to Anson Dorrance with the North Carolina Tar Heels women's soccer program on November 9, 2015. He became associate head coach ahead of the 2021 season. He was promoted to interim head coach following Dorance's resignation on August 11, 2024, days before the 2024 season. In his first season as head coach, he led North Carolina to victory in the NCAA tournament, defeating Duke 3–0 in the semifinals and Wake Forest 1–0 in the championship game, the same day that his interim tag was dropped.
