= Liya Brooks =

Jamaican footballer (born 2005)

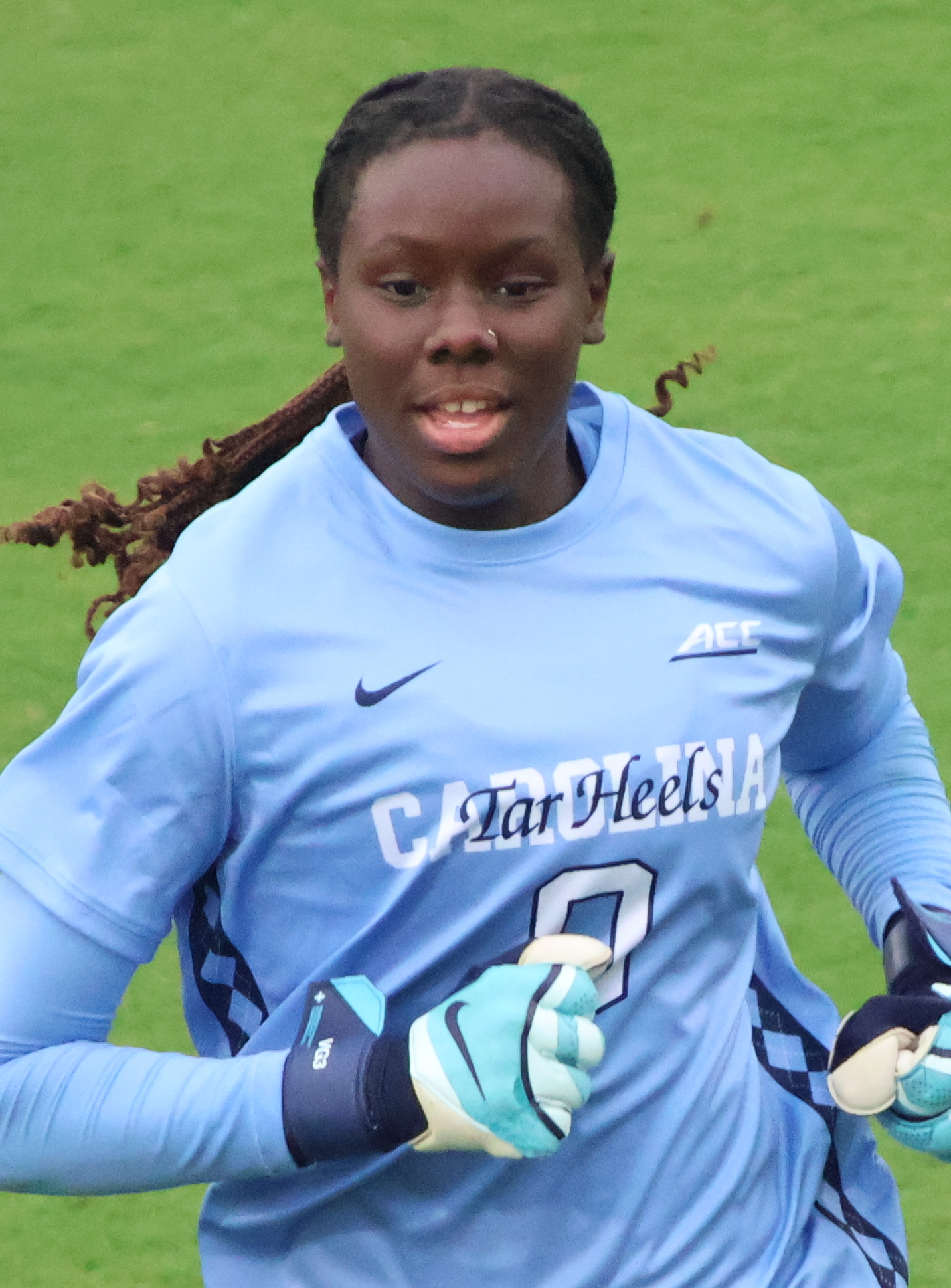
- Brooks with North Carolina in 2025

Personal information
- Full name: Liya Njeri N'Day Brooks
- Date of birth: 17 May 2005 (age 21)
- Place of birth: New Jersey, U.S.
- Height: 1.75 m (5 ft 9 in)
- Position: Goalkeeper

Team information
- Current team: North Carolina Tar Heels
- Number: 0

College career
Years	Team	Apps	(Gls)
2023–2024	Washington State Cougars	1	(0)
2025–	North Carolina Tar Heels	5	(0)

International career
2022	Jamaica U17	5	(0)
2022–2023	Jamaica U20	5	(0)
2024–	Jamaica	5	(0)

Liya Njeri N'Day Brooks (born 17 May 2005) is a footballer who plays as a goalkeeper for the North Carolina Tar Heels. Born in the United States, she represents Jamaica internationally.

== Early life ==
Brooks began playing football at age eight. She attended Moanalua High School in Honolulu as a freshman and sophomore before transferring to South Eugene High School in Eugene, Oregon, ahead of her junior year.

== College career ==
Brooks made one substitute appearance in two seasons with the Washington State Cougars before transferring to the North Carolina Tar Heels in 2025.

== International career ==
Brooks made her senior international debut in goal against South Africa on 29 November 2024, in Montego Bay, Jamaica.
