= Peyton McGovern =

American soccer player (born 2006)

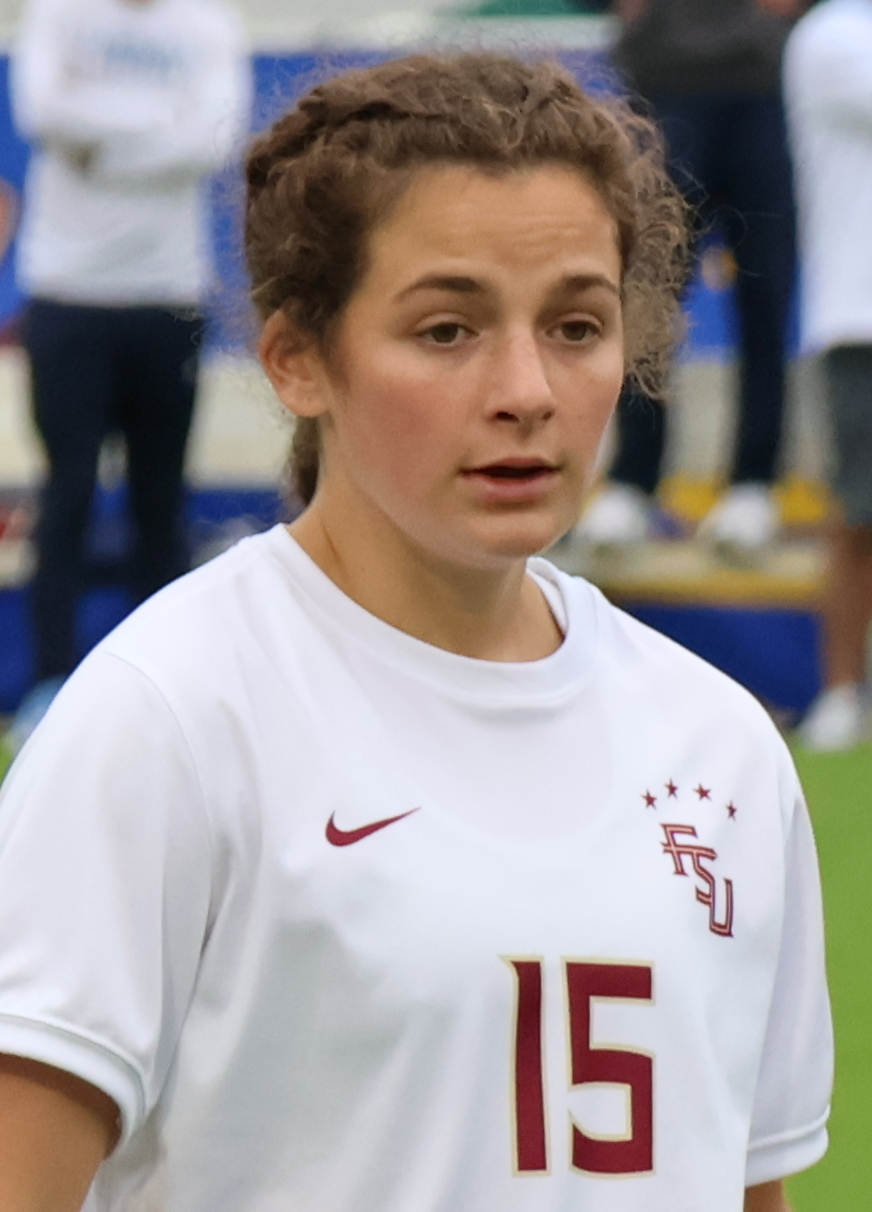
- McGovern with Florida State in 2024

Personal information
- Full name: Peyton Elizabeth McGovern
- Date of birth: July 5, 2006 (age 20)
- Height: 5 ft 1 in (1.55 m)
- Position: Midfielder

Team information
- Current team: Florida State Seminoles
- Number: 12

College career
Years	Team	Apps	(Gls)
2024–	Florida State Seminoles	41	(0)

International career^{‡}
2025–	United States U-20	3	(0)
- ‡ National team caps and goals as of June 6, 2025

Peyton Elizabeth McGovern (born July 5, 2006) is an American college soccer player who plays as a midfielder for the Florida State Seminoles. She won the 2025 national championship with the Seminoles. She has represented the United States at the youth international level.

== Early life ==
McGovern grew up in Bristow, Virginia. She played high school soccer for Brentsville District High School in Nokesville, Virginia, setting school career records with 91 goals and 75 assists. She played club soccer for the Virginia Development Academy and was named ECNL All-American in 2021. She led Brentsville to the VHSL Class 3 state championship as a junior in 2023, scoring 31 goals including the lone goal against Lafayette in the state final, and was named the Class 3 state player of the year. She then led a successful title defense in her senior year in 2024, scoring 32 goals including two in the 2–1 final win over Western Albemarle, and repeated as the Class 3 state player of the year. Her high school coach compared her to Ali Krieger as one of the most talented players to come out of Prince William County, Virginia. She initially committed to play college soccer for Arkansas before flipping her commitment to Florida State. She was ranked by TopDrawerSoccer as the 70th-best prospect of the 2024 class, part of Florida State's top-ranked recruiting class.

== College career ==
McGovern played in 19 games Florida State Seminoles, starting 5, as a freshman in 2024. She helped the team win their fifth consecutive ACC tournament and earn a one seed in the NCAA tournament, losing in the second round on penalties. She took on a larger role as a sophomore in 2025, playing in all 22 games and starting 18 of them. She played every minute in the NCAA tournament following the first round, earning an assist on Wrianna Hudson's goal in the 1–0 semifinal win over TCU before winning 1–0 against Stanford in the final. She was named to the NCAA all-tournament team as the Seminoles won their fifth national title.

== International career ==
McGovern was first called into the United States under-19 team in the spring of 2025. She then made the under-20 squad for the 2025 CONCACAF Women's U-20 Championship, playing in three games as the United States qualified for the 2026 FIFA U-20 Women's World Cup.

== Personal life ==
McGovern is the daughter of Crystal and Todd McGovern. Her older sister, Taylor, played soccer with her in high school.

== Honors and awards ==
Florida State Seminoles

- NCAA Division I women's soccer tournament: 2025
- ACC women's soccer tournament: 2024

Individual

- NCAA tournament all-tournament team: 2025
