= 2025 NCAA Division I women's soccer rankings =

- Season: 2025
- NCAA tournament: 2025
- Preseason No. 1: North Carolina
- NCAA Tournament Champions: Florida State
NCAA Division I women's soccer rankings
← 2024

Two major human polls made up the 2025 NCAA Division I women's soccer rankings: United Soccer Coaches and Top Drawer Soccer.

== Legend ==
	Increase in ranking
	Decrease in ranking
	New to rankings from previous week
Italics	Number of first place votes
(#–#)	Win-loss record
т	Tied with team above or below also with this symbol

== United Soccer Coaches ==
	Preseason Jul 31	Week 1 Aug 19	Week 2 Aug 26	Week 3 Sep 2	Week 4 Sep 9	Week 5 Sep 16	Week 6 Sep 23	Week 7 Sep 30	Week 8 Oct 7	Week 9 Oct 14	Week 10 Oct 21	Week 11 Oct 28	Week 12 Nov 4	Final Dec 9	
1.	North Carolina (8)	Duke (1–0–0) (3)	Stanford (4–0–0) (3)	Stanford (5–0–0) (6)	Tennessee (6–0–1) (6)	Virginia (7–0–1) (7)	Virginia (8–0–1) (8)	Virginia (9–0–1) (8)	Virginia (10–0–1) (8)	Notre Dame (12–0–1) (8)	Notre Dame (12–0–1) (8)	Notre Dame (13–0–2) (8)	Stanford (15–1–1) (8)	Florida State (16–2–4) (7)	1.
2.	Notre Dame	Stanford (2–0–0) (3)	Tennessee (4–0–0) (4)	Tennessee (5–0–0) (2)	Duke (5–0–1) (1)	Stanford (7–1–1) (1)	Notre Dame (7–0–1)	Notre Dame (9–0–1)	Notre Dame (10–0–1)	Stanford (11–1–1)	Stanford (13–1–1)	Stanford (14–1–1)	Notre Dame (13–1–2)	Stanford (21–2–2)	2.
3.	Florida State	Florida State (2–0–0) (2)	Duke (2–0–0) (1)	Duke (4–0–0)	Stanford (6–1–0)	Duke (6–1–1)	Stanford (7–1–1)	Stanford (9–1–1)	Stanford (9–1–1)	Virginia (10–1–2)	Virginia (10–1–3)	Memphis (14–0–2)	Memphis (16–0–2)	Duke (17–5–1) (1)	3.
4.	Duke	UCLA (1–0–0)	TCU (3–0–0)т	TCU (4–0–0)	UCLA (4–2–0) (1)	UCLA (5–2–0)	UCLA (6–2–1)	UCLA (8–2–1)	Tennessee (11–1–1)	Tennessee (11–1–2)	Memphis (13–0–2)	Arkansas (9–3–4)	Arkansas (9–3–4)	TCU (18–3–3)	4.
5.	USC	USC (1–0–0)	USC (3–0–0)т	Notre Dame (4–0–1)	Virginia (5–0–1)	Tennessee (6–1–1)	Tennessee (8–1–1)	Tennessee (9–1–1)	Florida State (8–0–2)	Iowa (10–2–3)	Texas Tech (12–1–2)	TCU (14–2–1)	TCU (15–2–1)	Vanderbilt (18–4–2)	5.
6.	Arkansas	Tennessee (2–0–0)	Florida State (2–0–0)т	USC (3–0–1)	Notre Dame (5–0–1)	Notre Dame (6–0–1)	Florida State (7–0–2)	Florida State (7–0–2)	Arkansas (7–2–3)	Memphis (12–0–2)	Arkansas (8–3–4)	Florida State (9–2–3)	Florida State (10–2–4)	Washington (15–3–7)	6.
7.	Stanford	TCU (2–0–0)т	Notre Dame (2–0–1)т	Florida State (2–0–1)	Florida State (4–0–1)	Florida State (6–0–1)	Arkansas (5–2–2)	TCU (9–1–0)т	Iowa (8–2–3)	Florida State (8–1–2)	Duke (9–3–1)	Virginia (11–2–3)	Virginia (12–2–4)	Michigan State (15–4–6)	7.
8.	UCLA	Notre Dame (1–0–1)т	Arkansas (1–1–1)	Virginia (4–0–1)	Penn State (4–2–1)	Penn State (5–2–1)	Iowa (7–1–2)	Arkansas (6–2–2)т	Memphis (10–0–2)	South Carolina (10–1–4)	Washington (11–1–5)	Vanderbilt (13–3–1)	Vanderbilt (13–3–1)	Virginia (14–3–5)	8.
9.	TCU	Iowa (1–0–0)	Penn State (2–1–0)	Penn State (3–1–1)	Arkansas (2–2–2)	Memphis (7–0–1)	Duke (6–2–1)	Memphis (9–0–2)	UCLA (8–3–1)	Duke (8–3–1)	TCU (12–2–1)	Michigan State (10–3–5)	Michigan State (11–3–5)	Ohio State (11–5–6)т	9.
10.	Wake Forest	Wake Forest (2–0–0)	Iowa (2–1–0)	South Carolina (5–0–1)	Memphis (6–0–1)	BYU (5–1–1)т	TCU (7–1–0)	Iowa (8–2–2)т	South Carolina (9–1–4)	Baylor (10–1–2)	Vanderbilt (12–3–1)	Duke (11–3–1)	Georgetown (14–2–2)	Georgetown (16–4–3)т	10.
11.	Penn State	Vanderbilt (2–0–0)	BYU (2–0–1)	BYU (3–0–1)т	Iowa (5–1–1)	Arkansas (3–2–2)т	Memphis (7–0–2)	South Carolina (9–1–2)т	Texas Tech (10–1–1)	Arkansas (7–3–3)	Florida State (8–2–3)	Colorado (13–2–3)	Duke (13–3–1)	Notre Dame (15–2–3)	11.
12.	Michigan State	North Carolina (1–1–0)	South Carolina (4–0–0)	Iowa (3–1–1)т	BYU (4–1–1)	Iowa (5–1–2)т	South Carolina (8–1–2)	Wake Forest (9–1–2)	Mississippi State (9–2–1)	Texas Tech (10–1–2)	Georgetown (12–2–2)	Georgetown (13–2–2)	Colorado (14–2–3)	Colorado (17–4–3)	12.
13.	Iowa	Arkansas (0–1–1)	Virginia (3–0–0)т	Arkansas (1–2–1)	Vanderbilt (6–1–0)	Mississippi State (6–1–0)т	Vanderbilt (7–2–1)	Mississippi State (8–1–1)	Wake Forest (9–2–2)	Georgetown (10–2–2)	Michigan State (9–3–5)	Iowa (11–3–4)	Washington (12–2–5)	North Carolina (13–6–2)т	13.
14.	Virginia Tech	Penn State (0–1–0)	Georgia (3–1–0)т	Memphis (5–0–0)	TCU (5–1–0)	TCU (6–1–0)	Kansas (7–0–2)	Duke (6–3–1)	Duke (7–3–1)т	TCU (10–2–1)	Tennessee (11–2–3)	Tennessee (12–2–3)	Tennessee (12–2–3)	Kansas (16–6–3)т	14.
15.	Virginia	Virginia Tech (2–0–0)	Memphis (4–0–0)	Georgia (4–1–1)	USC (3–1–1)	South Carolina (7–1–1)	Mississippi State (7–1–1)	Georgetown (7–2–2)	Baylor (9–1–2)т	Wisconsin (11–3–1)	Iowa (10–3–4)	Texas Tech (13–2–2)	Wisconsin (13–4–2)	Baylor (14–5–4)	15.
16.	Santa Clara	South Carolina (2–0–0)	Georgetown (2–0–1)	Georgetown (2–0–2)	Georgetown (3–1–2)	Wake Forest (7–1–1)	BYU (5–2–1)	Michigan State (6–2–4)	Georgetown (9–2–2)	Michigan State (7–3–5)	Baylor (11–2–2)	Washington (11–2–5)	West Virginia (13–2–3)	LSU (15–6–4)	16.
17.	Vanderbilt	Virginia (1–0–0)	Michigan State (2–0–2)т	Wake Forest (4–1–0)	South Carolina (6–1–1)	Vanderbilt (6–1–1)	Georgia (7–2–2)	Georgia (7–2–3)	TCU (10–2–0)	Wake Forest (9–2–3)т	South Carolina (10–2–5)	Georgia (10–3–5)	UCLA (11–4–3)	Arkansas (10–5–4)	17.
18.	Ohio State	Texas Tech (2–0–0)	Mississippi State (2–0–0)т	UCLA (2–2–0)	Wake Forest (5–1–1)	North Carolina (7–2–0)	Penn State (5–3–2)	Texas Tech (8–1–1)	Michigan State (6–2–5)	Washington (9–1–5)т	UCLA (10–4–2)	Xavier (13–2–2)	Texas Tech (13–2–3)	Memphis (17–1–3)	18.
19.	Texas	BYU (1–0–0)	Wake Forest (3–1–0)	Oklahoma (6–0–0)	North Carolina (6–2–0)	Kansas (6–0–2)	Wake Forest (8–1–2)	North Carolina (7–4–0)	North Carolina (9–4–0)	Georgia (8–3–4)	Xavier (12–2–2)	West Virginia (12–2–3)	Georgia (10–3–5)	West Virginia (14–3–4)	19.
20.	Mississippi State	Michigan State (0–0–2)	Oklahoma (4–0–0)	Virginia Tech (4–1–1)т	Oklahoma (7–0–1)	Georgetown (4–2–2)	Wisconsin (7–2–1)	Baylor (7–1–2)	Xavier (9–2–2)	Xavier (10–2–2)	Wisconsin (12–4–1)т	UCLA (10–4–3)	Louisville (13–4–2)	BYU (11–7–6)	20.
21.	South Carolina	Wisconsin (2–0–0)	Wisconsin (4–0–0)	Ohio State (2–1–1)т	Kansas (5–0–2)	Georgia (5–2–2)	Georgetown (5–2–2)	Ohio State (4–1–5)	Vanderbilt (9–3–1)	Vanderbilt (10–3–1)т	Louisville (11–3–2)т	Louisville (12–3–2)	Iowa (11–4–4)	Iowa (12–5–4)	21.
22.	Oklahoma State	Oklahoma (2–0–0)	North Carolina (2–2–0)	Kansas (4–0–2)	Ohio State (4–1–1)	Ohio State (3–1–2)	North Carolina (7–3–0)	Xavier (7–2–2)	Ohio State (4–1–6)т	Colorado (10–2–2)т	Colorado (11–2–2)	South Carolina (10–3–5)	Xavier (13–3–2)	UCLA (12–5–4)	22.
23.	Wisconsin	Saint Louis (1–0–0)	UCLA (1–2–0)	North Carolina (4–2–0)	Wisconsin (6–1–0)	Xavier (4–2–1)	Ohio State (3–1–4)	Louisville (10–2–0)	Georgia (7–3–4)т	North Carolina (9–5–0)	North Carolina (10–5–0)	Baylor (11–3–2)	Baylor (12–3–3)	Wisconsin (14–6–2)	23.
24.	Minnesota	Memphis (2–0–0)	Virginia Tech (3–1–0)	Xavier (3–2–0)	Georgia (4–2–2)	Oklahoma (7–1–1)	Xavier (6–2–1)	Wisconsin (8–3–1)т	Colorado (9–2–2)	West Virginia (9–2–2)	West Virginia (10–2–3)	Wisconsin (12–4–2)	Clemson (7–5–5)	Louisville (13–5–3)	24.
25.	Texas Tech	Ohio State (0–0–1)	Vanderbilt (3–1–0)	Vanderbilt (4–1–0)	Colorado State (6–0–0)	Rice (5–1–1)	Alabama (8–2–1)т; Rice (7–1–1)т	Vanderbilt (7–3–1)т	West Virginia (8–2–2)	Ohio State (5–2–6)	Mississippi State (10–4–1)	Clemson (7–4–5)	LSU (11–5–3)	Xavier (16–4–2)	25.
	Preseason Jul 31	Week 1 Aug 19	Week 2 Aug 26	Week 3 Sep 2	Week 4 Sep 9	Week 5 Sep 16	Week 6 Sep 23	Week 7 Sep 30	Week 8 Oct 7	Week 9 Oct 14	Week 10 Oct 21	Week 11 Oct 28	Week 12 Nov 4	Final Dec 9	
		Dropped: No. 16 Santa Clara; No. 19 Texas; No. 20 Mississippi State; No. 22 Oklahoma State; No. 24 Minnesota	Dropped: No. 18 Texas Tech; No. 23 Saint Louis; No. 25 Ohio State	Dropped: No. 17т Michigan State; No. 17т Mississippi State; No. 21 Wisconsin	Dropped: No. 20т Virginia Tech; No. 24 Xavier	Dropped: No. 15 USC; No. 23 Wisconsin; No. 25 Colorado State	Dropped: No. 24 Oklahoma	Dropped: No. 14 Kansas; No. 16 BYU; No. 18 Penn State; No. 25т Alabama; No. 25т Rice	Dropped: No. 23 Louisville; No. 24т Wisconsin	Dropped: No. 9 UCLA; No. 12 Mississippi State	Dropped: No. 17т Wake Forest; No. 19 Georgia; No. 25 Ohio State	Dropped: No. 23 North Carolina; No. 25 Mississippi State	Dropped: No. 22 South Carolina	Dropped: No. 14 Tennessee; No. 18 Texas Tech; No. 19 Georgia; No. 24 Clemson	

== Top Drawer Soccer ==
	Preseason Aug 11	Week 1 Aug 18	Week 2 Aug 25	Week 3 Sep 1	Week 4 Sep 8	Week 5 Sep 15	Week 6 Sep 22	Week 7 Sep 29	Week 8 Oct 6	Week 9 Oct 13	Week 10 Oct 20	Week 11 Oct 27	Week 12 Nov 3	Week 13 Nov 10	Week 14 Nov 17	Week 15 Nov 24	Final Dec 9	
1.	North Carolina	Stanford (2–0–0)	Stanford (4–0–0)	Stanford (5–0–0)	Notre Dame (5–0–1)	Notre Dame (6–0–1)	Notre Dame (7–0–1)	Notre Dame (9–0–1)	Notre Dame (10–0–1)	Notre Dame (12–0–1)	Notre Dame (12–0–1)	Stanford (14–1–1)	Stanford (15–1–1)	Stanford (16–1–2)	Stanford (17–1–2)	Stanford (18–1–2)	Florida State (16–2–4)	1.
2.	Stanford	Florida State (2–0–0)	Florida State (2–0–0)	Duke (4–0–0)	Florida State (4–0–1)	Florida State (6–0–1)	Virginia (8–0–1)	Virginia (9–0–1)	Virginia (10–0–1)	Stanford (11–1–1)	Stanford (13–1–1)	Notre Dame (13–0–2)	Notre Dame (13–1–2)	Notre Dame (14–1–3)	Notre Dame (15–1–3)	Washington (15–2–7)	Stanford (21–2–2)	2.
3.	Notre Dame	Duke (1–0–0)	Duke (2–0–0)	Tennessee (5–0–0)	Tennessee (6–0–1)	Virginia (7–0–1)	Tennessee (8–1–1)	Tennessee (9–1–1)	Tennessee (11–1–1)	Virginia (10–1–2)	Texas Tech (12–1–2)	Memphis (14–0–2)	Memphis (15–0–2)	Washington (13–2–6)	Washington (14–2–6)	Vanderbilt (18–3–2)	TCU (18–3–3)	3.
4.	Florida State	UCLA (1–0–0)	Tennessee (4–0–0)	TCU (4–0–0)	Duke (5–0–1)	UCLA (5–2–0)	UCLA (6–2–1)	UCLA (8–2–1)	Stanford (9–1–1)	Texas Tech (10–1–2)	Memphis (12–0–2)	Colorado (13–2–3)	Colorado (14–2–3)	Vanderbilt (15–3–2)	Vanderbilt (16–3–2)	TCU (17–2–2)	Duke (17–5–1)	4.
5.	Duke	Tennessee (2–0–0)	TCU (3–0–0)	Notre Dame (4–0–1)	UCLA (4–2–0)	Duke (6–1–1)	Stanford (7–1–1)	Stanford (9–1–1)	Florida State (8–0–2)	Florida State (8–1–2)	Washington (11–1–5)	Florida State (9–2–3)	TCU (15–2–1)	TCU (15–2–2)	TCU (16–2–2)	Florida State (13–2–4)	Washington (15–3–7)	5.
6.	Penn State	North Carolina (1–1–0)	Notre Dame (2–0–1)	Florida State (2–0–1)	Stanford (6–1–0)	Tennessee (6–1–1)	Florida State (7–0–2)	Florida State (7–0–2)	Arkansas (7–2–3)	Memphis (12–0–2)	Virginia (10–1–3)	Texas Tech (13–2–2)	Florida State (10–2–4)	Colorado (15–3–3)	Colorado (16–3–3)	Duke (16–4–1)	Vanderbilt (18–4–2)	6.
7.	Arkansas	Iowa (1–0–0)	Penn State (2–1–0)	BYU (3–0–1)	Virginia (5–0–1)	Stanford (7–1–1)	Duke (6–2–1)	TCU (9–1–0)	UCLA (8–3–1)	Baylor (10–1–2)	Colorado (11–2–2)	TCU (14–2–1)	Virginia (12–2–4)	Florida State (10–2–4)	Florida State (11–2–4)	Michigan State (15–3–6)	Michigan State (15–4–6)	7.
8.	UCLA	Notre Dame (1–0–1)	Iowa (2–1–0)	UCLA (2–2–0)	Memphis (6–0–1)	Memphis (7–0–1)	TCU (7–1–0)	Arkansas (6–2–2)	Memphis (10–0–2)	Tennessee (11–1–2)	TCU (12–2–1)	Virginia (11–2–3)	Washington (12–2–5)	Virginia (12–3–4)	Virginia (13–3–4)	Ohio State (11–4–6)	Ohio State (11–5–6)	8.
9.	Ohio State	Virginia Tech (2–0–0)	Arkansas (1–1–1)	Penn State (3–1–1)	TCU (5–1–0)	TCU (6–1–0)	Kansas (7–0–2)	Memphis (9–0–2)	Texas Tech (10–1–1)	Colorado (10–2–2)	Florida State (8–2–3)	Washington (11–2–5)	Duke (13–3–1)	Memphis (16–0–3)	Memphis (17–0–3)	Colorado (17–3–3)	Colorado (17–4–3)	9.
10.	Virginia Tech	Penn State (0–1–0)	Wisconsin (4–0–0)	Iowa (3–1–1)	Iowa (5–1–1)	Penn State (5–2–1)	Iowa (7–1–2)	Louisville (10–2–0)	Mississippi State (9–2–1)	Duke (8–3–1)	Baylor (11–2–2)	Duke (11–3–1)	Georgetown (14–2–2)	Duke (13–4–1)	Duke (14–4–1)	Virginia (14–3–5)	Virginia (14–3–5)	10.
11.	Michigan State	Arkansas (0–1–1)	BYU (2–0–1)	Arkansas (1–2–1)	Penn State (4–2–1)	North Carolina (7–2–0)	North Carolina (7–3–0)	Mississippi State (8–1–1)	Louisville (10–3–0)	Washington (9–1–5)	Duke (9–3–1)	Tennessee (12–2–3)	Tennessee (12–2–3)	Xavier (15–3–2)	Xavier (16–3–2)	BYU (11–6–6)	BYU (11–7–6)	11.
12.	Vanderbilt	Vanderbilt (2–0–0)	UCLA (1–2–0)	Wisconsin (4–1–0)	Wisconsin (6–1–0)	Kansas (6–0–2)	Arkansas (5–2–2)	Wake Forest (9–1–2)	Baylor (9–1–2)	Arkansas (7–3–3)	Tennessee (11–2–3)	Georgetown (13–2–2)	Texas Tech (13–2–3)	BYU (11–6–4)	BYU (11–6–5)	LSU (15–5–4)	LSU (15–6–4)	12.
13.	Wisconsin	Wisconsin (2–0–0)	Georgia (3–1–0)	Virginia (4–0–1)	Vanderbilt (6–1–0)	Mississippi State (6–1–0)	Memphis (7–0–2)	Texas Tech (8–1–1)	Colorado (9–2–2)	TCU (10–2–1)	UCLA (10–4–2)	Xavier (13–2–2)	Arkansas (9–3–4)	Michigan State (12–3–6)	Michigan State (13–3–6)	Georgetown (16–4–3)	Georgetown (16–4–3)	13.
14.	Minnesota	Ohio State (0–0–1)	South Carolina (4–0–0)	Georgetown (2–0–2)	North Carolina (6–2–0)	Iowa (5–1–2)	Louisville (9–2–0)	Duke (6–3–1)	Duke (7–3–1)	UCLA (8–4–2)	Georgetown (12–2–2)	Louisville (12–3–2)	Vanderbilt (13–3–1)	LSU (13–5–4)	LSU (14–5–4)	Baylor (14–5–4)	Baylor (14–5–4)	14.
15.	South Carolina	South Carolina (2–0–0)	North Carolina (2–2–0)	Memphis (5–0–0)	Kansas (5–0–2)	Vanderbilt (6–1–1)	Mississippi State (7–1–1)	South Carolina (9–1–2)	TCU (10–2–0)	Louisville (11–3–1)	Xavier (12–2–2)	Arkansas (9–3–4)	Louisville (13–4–2)	Georgetown (15–3–2)	Georgetown (16–3–2)	Kansas (16–6–3)	Kansas (16–6–3)	15.
16.	TCU	TCU (2–0–0)	Memphis (4–0–0)	Vanderbilt (4–1–0)	Illinois (7–0–0)	Arkansas (3–2–2)	Vanderbilt (7–2–1)	Georgetown (7–2–2)	Georgetown (9–2–2)	Georgetown (10–2–2)	Louisville (11–3–2)	Vanderbilt (13–3–1)	Baylor (12–3–3)	Kansas (14–5–3)	Kansas (15–5–3)	North Carolina (13–6–1)	North Carolina (13–6–2)	16.
17.	Iowa	Wake Forest (2–0–0)	USC (3–0–0)	Georgia (4–1–1)	Georgetown (3–1–2)	BYU (5–1–1)	Arizona State (8–0–1)	Baylor (7–1–2)	North Carolina (9–4–0)	Mississippi State (9–3–1)	Arkansas (8–3–4)	California (8–2–8)	West Virginia (13–2–3)	Tennessee (12–3–3)	Texas Tech (14–2–4)	Notre Dame (15–2–3)	Notre Dame (15–2–3)	17.
18.	Wake Forest	Texas Tech (2–0–0)	Mississippi State (2–0–0)	South Carolina (5–0–1)	Arkansas (2–2–2)	Illinois (7–0–1)	Penn State (5–3–2)	Colorado (8–1–2)	Washington (7–1–5)	Wake Forest (9–2–3)	North Carolina (10–5–0)	Baylor (11–3–3)	UCLA (11–4–3)	Texas Tech (13–2–4)	Arkansas (10–4–4)	Memphis (17–1–3)	Memphis (17–1–3)	18.
19.	Texas Tech	BYU (1–0–0)	Vanderbilt (3–1–0)	North Carolina (4–2–0)	BYU (4–1–1)	South Carolina (7–1–1)	BYU (5–2–1)	North Carolina (7–4–0)	South Carolina (9–1–4)	South Carolina (10–1–4)	Vanderbilt (12–3–1)	West Virginia (12–2–3)	Xavier (13–3–2)	Arkansas (9–4–4)	Louisville (13–4–3)	Xavier (16–4–2)	Xavier (16–4–2)	19.
20.	Texas	USC (1–0–0)	Wake Forest (3–1–0)	USC (3–0–1)	Louisville (7–1–0)	Wake Forest (7–1–1)	Saint Mary's (5–1–1)	Iowa (8–2–2)	Wake Forest (9–2–2)	Xavier (10–2–2)	Ohio State (8–2–6)	UCLA (10–4–3)	Dayton (14–3–2)	Louisville (13–4–2)	Baylor (13–4–4)	Texas Tech (14–2–5)	Texas Tech (14–2–5)	20.
21.	USC	Mississippi State (0–0–0)	Virginia (3–0–0)	Kansas (4–0–2)	Mississippi State (5–1–0)	Wisconsin (6–2–0)	South Carolina (8–1–2)	Kansas (7–2–2)	Cal State Fullerton (10–0–2)	Iowa (10–2–3)	California (8–2–8)	Dayton (13–3–2)	Michigan State (11–3–5)	Baylor (12–4–4)	West Virginia (14–3–3)	Arkansas (10–5–4)	Arkansas (10–5–4)	21.
22.	Mississippi State	Connecticut (1–0–0)	Oklahoma (4–0–0)	Oklahoma (6–0–0)	South Carolina (6–1–1)	Louisville (8–2–0)	Wake Forest (8–1–2)	Ohio State (5–1–5)	St. Mary's (7–1–2)	West Virginia (9–2–2)	West Virginia (10–2–3)	Iowa (11–3–4)	Fairfield (15–1–2)	West Virginia (13–3–3)	UCLA (12–5–3)	Louisville (13–5–3)	Louisville (13–5–3)	22.
23.	Georgetown	Kansas (2–0–0)	Georgetown (2–0–1)	Mississippi State (3–1–0)	Ohio State (4–1–1)	Saint Mary's (5–1–1)	Illinois (8–1–1)	Cal State Fullerton (8–0–2)	Xavier (9–2–2)	North Carolina (9–5–0)	Dayton (11–3–2)	Michigan State (10–3–5)	LSU (11–5–3)	UCLA (11–5–3)	Wisconsin (14–5–2)	West Virginia (14–3–4)	West Virginia (14–3–4)	23.
24.	Connecticut	Virginia (1–0–0)	Virginia Tech (3–1–0)	Wake Forest (4–1–0)	Oklahoma (7–0–1)	Northwestern (4–1–3)	Wisconsin (7–2–1)	St. Mary's (6–1–2)	Iowa (8–2–3)	Illinois (12–2–1)	Iowa (10–3–4)	Kansas (12–3–3)	Wisconsin (13–4–2)	Dayton (15–3–3)	Iowa (12–4–4)	UCLA (12–5–4)	UCLA (12–5–4)	24.
25.	Kansas	Oklahoma (2–0–0)	Ohio State (1–1–1)	Ohio State (3–1–1)	Wake Forest (5–1–1)	Georgetown (4–2–2)	Georgetown (5–2–2)	Xavier (7–2–2)	Ohio State (5–1–6)	Saint Louis (11–2–1)	Michigan State (9–3–5)	Fairfield (14–1–2)	Kansas (12–4–3)	Wisconsin (13–5–2)	North Carolina (13–6–0)	Wisconsin (14–6–2)	Wisconsin (14–6–2)	25.
	Preseason Aug 11	Week 1 Aug 18	Week 2 Aug 25	Week 3 Sep 1	Week 4 Sep 8	Week 5 Sep 15	Week 6 Sep 22	Week 7 Sep 29	Week 8 Oct 6	Week 9 Oct 13	Week 10 Oct 20	Week 11 Oct 27	Week 12 Nov 3	Week 13 Nov 10	Week 14 Nov 17	Week 15 Nov 24	Final Dec 9	
		Dropped: No. 11 Michigan State; No. 14 Minnesota; No. 20 Texas; No. 23 Georgetown	Dropped: No. 18 Texas Tech; No. 22 Connecticut; No. 23 Kansas	Dropped: No. 24 Virginia Tech	Dropped: No. 17 Georgia; No. 20 USC	Dropped: No. 23 Ohio State; No. 24 Oklahoma	Dropped: No. 24 Northwestern	Dropped: No. 16 Vanderbilt; No. 17 Arizona State; No. 18 Penn State; No. 19 BYU; No. 23 Illinois; No. 24 Wisconsin	Dropped: No. 21 Kansas	Dropped: No. 21 Cal State Fullerton; No. 22 St. Mary's; No. 25 Ohio State	Dropped: No. 17 Mississippi State; No. 18 Wake Forest; No. 19 South Carolina; No. 24 Illinois; No. 25 Saint Louis	Dropped: No. 18 North Carolina; No. 20 Ohio State	Dropped: No. 17 California; No. 22 Iowa	Dropped: No. 22 Fairfield	Dropped: No. 17 Tennessee; No. 24 Dayton	Dropped: No. 24 Iowa	None	
