= 2023 Atlantic Coast Conference women's soccer season =

- League: NCAA Division I
- Sport: Soccer
- Duration: August 17, 2023 – December 2023
- Teams: 14

2024 NWSL Draft
- Top draft pick: (United States) Ally Sentnor
- Picked by: Utah Royals, 1st overall

Regular season
- Season champions: Florida State
- Runners-up: Notre Dame
- Season MVP: Offensive: Onyi Echegini; Midfielder: Ally Sentnor; Defensive: Eva Gaetino
- Top scorer: Onyi Echegini (Florida State)

Tournament
- Champions: Florida State
- Runners-up: Clemson
- Finals MVP: Onyi Echegini (Florida State)

ACC women's soccer seasons
- ← 2022 2024 →

2023 ACC women's soccer standings
	Conf.						Overall
Team	W		L		T	PCT	W		L		T	PCT
No. 1 Florida State ‍†‍‡‍^{y}	9	–	0	–	1	.950	22	–	0	–	1	.978
No. 16 Notre Dame ‍‍‍^{y}	7	–	1	–	2	.800	12	–	4	–	4	.700
No. 3 Clemson ‍‍‍^{y}	7	–	2	–	1	.750	18	–	4	–	4	.769
No. 8 North Carolina ‍‍‍^{y}	5	–	0	–	5	.750	13	–	2	–	8	.739
No. 6 Pittsburgh ‍‍‍^{y}	6	–	3	–	1	.650	17	–	6	–	1	.729
Wake Forest ‍‍‍	4	–	2	–	4	.600	10	–	3	–	5	.694
Virginia ‍‍‍	3	–	3	–	4	.500	8	–	3	–	6	.647
Virginia Tech ‍‍‍	4	–	6	–	0	.400	7	–	8	–	3	.472
Louisville ‍‍‍	3	–	5	–	2	.400	4	–	9	–	5	.361
Duke ‍‍‍	2	–	5	–	3	.350	6	–	7	–	3	.469
NC State ‍‍‍	2	–	5	–	3	.350	3	–	9	–	6	.333
Miami (FL) ‍‍‍	2	–	7	–	1	.250	3	–	10	–	4	.294
Boston College ‍‍‍	0	–	6	–	4	.200	3	–	9	–	6	.333
Syracuse ‍‍‍	0	–	9	–	1	.050	2	–	14	–	2	.167
† – Conference champion ‡ – 2023 ACC Tournament champion y – Invited to the NCAA Tournament; Source: The ACC; As of December 5, 2023; Rankings from United Soccer Coaches Poll

The 2023 Atlantic Coast Conference women's soccer season was the 35th season of women's varsity soccer in the conference.

North Carolina and were Florida State the defending regular season champions. Florida State was the defending ACC tournament champions.

Florida State successfully defended its regular season and ACC tournament title. They finished 9–0–1 in ACC play and won both of their games in the ACC Tournament. Florida State would go on to win the national championship, and complete an undefeated season. They were the first team to finish undefeated since Stanford in 2011.

== Teams ==
=== Stadiums and locations ===
Team	Stadium	Capacity
Boston College Eagles	Newton Soccer Complex	1,800
Clemson Tigers	Riggs Field	6,500
Duke Blue Devils	Koskinen Stadium	7,000
Florida State Seminoles	Seminole Soccer Complex	2,000
Louisville Cardinals	Lynn Stadium	5,300
Miami Hurricanes	Cobb Stadium	500
NC State	Dail Soccer Field	3,000
North Carolina Tar Heels	Dorrance Field	4,200
Notre Dame Fighting Irish	Alumni Stadium	2,500
Pittsburgh Panthers	Ambrose Urbanic Field	735
Syracuse Orange	SU Soccer Stadium	1,500
Virginia Cavaliers	Klöckner Stadium	7,100
Virginia Tech Hokies	Thompson Field	2,500
Wake Forest Demon Deacons	Spry Stadium	3,000

1. Georgia Tech does not sponsor women's soccer

== Coaches ==
=== Head coaching records ===
Team	Head coach	Years at school	Overall record	Record at school	ACC record
Boston College	Jason Lowe	5	23–36–9	23–36–9	4–31–3
Clemson	Eddie Radwanski	13	264–142–43	125–77–30	54–55–12
Duke	Robbie Church	23	375–189–74	287–140–63	110–65–36
Florida State	Brian Pensky	2	202–114–48	17–3–3	8–2–0
Louisville	Karen Ferguson-Dayes	22	200–183–41	200–183–41	33–45–11
Miami	Sarah Barnes	6	81–90–23	21–49–9	8–37–3
North Carolina	Anson Dorrance	45	883–78–42	883–78–42	221–30–13
NC State	Tim Santoro	11	83–89–23	83–89–23	25–58–10
Notre Dame	Nate Norman	6	114–69–21	56–34–7	26–19–1
Pittsburgh	Randy Waldrum	6	444–147–36	45–39–7	21–35–4
Syracuse	Nicky Adams	5	103–92–29	16–37–6	3–30–4
Virginia	Steve Swanson	23	467–168–67	363–105–56	144–48–25
Virginia Tech	Charles Adair	13	148–75–24	148–75–24	55–51–16
Wake Forest	Tony da Luz	26	338–234–55	293–193–53	99–116–24

Notes

- Records shown are prior to the 2023 season
- Years at school includes the 2023 season

== Pre-season ==
=== Hermann Trophy Watchlist ===
The Hermann Trophy preseason watchlist was released on the first day of the season August 17, 2023.

Player	Class	Position	School
Megan Bornkamp	Junior	DF	Clemson
Jody Brown	Senior	FW	Florida State
Leah Freeman	Senior	GK	Duke
Eva Gaetino	Senior	DF	Notre Dame
Lia Godfrey	Senior	MF	Virginia
Taylor Huff	Junior	MF	Florida State
Sam Meza	Senior	MF	North Carolina
Cristina Roque	Senior	GK	Florida State

=== Pre-season poll ===
The pre-season poll and pre-season all conference teams were voted on by the league's 14 head coaches. The results of the poll were released on August 10, 2023.

==== Pre-season Coaches Poll ====
Predicted finish	Team	Points (1st place)
1	North Carolina	166 (10)
2	Florida State	146 (2)
3	Virginia	139 (1)
4	Notre Dame	134
5	Duke	126 (1)
6	Clemson	104
7	Pittsburgh	103
8	Wake Forest	87
9	Virginia Tech	81
10	NC State	62
11	Louisville	47
12	Syracuse	35
13	Miami	24
14	Boston College	20

==== Pre-season All-ACC Team ====
Position	Player	Class	School
Goalkeeper	Cristina Roque	Senior	Florida State
Defender	Maycee Bell	Senior	North Carolina
Defender	Megan Bornkamp	Senior	Clemson
Defender	Eva Gaetino	Senior	Notre Dame
Midfielder	Hal Hershfelt	Graduate Student	Clemson
Midfielder	Sam Meza	Senior	North Carolina
Midfielder	Ally Sentnor	Sophomore	North Carolina
Forward	Jody Brown	Senior	Florida State
Forward	Maggie Cagle	Sophomore	Virginia
Forward	Jameese Joseph	Senior	NC State
Forward	Kat Rader	Sophomore	Duke
Forward	Amanda West	Graduate Student	Pittsburgh

== Regular season ==
=== Conference Matrix ===
The table below shows head-to-head results between teams in conference play. Each team plays ten matches. Each team does not play every other team.

	Boston College	Clemson	Duke	Florida State	Louisville	Miami	North Carolina	NC State	Notre Dame	Pittsburgh	Syracuse	Virginia	Virginia Tech	Wake Forest
vs. Boston College	–	2–0	2–0	6–0	1–1	DNP	1–1	DNP	3–1	2–0	DNP	1–1	2–1	1–1
vs. Clemson	0–2	–	0–1	4–2	0–3	0–5	DNP	DNP	2–0	0–1	1–5	1–1	0–1	DNP
vs. Duke	0–2	1–0	–	4–0	1–0	DNP	1–1	0–0	2–1	2–1	DNP	1–1	0–1	DNP
vs. Florida State	0–6	2–4	0–4	–	0–2	0–2	3–3	0–5	1–4	2–3	2–3	DNP	DNP	DNP
vs. Louisville	1–1	3–0	0–1	2–0	–	1–0	DNP	DNP	3–0	2–3	1–2	1–1	DNP	1–0
vs. Miami	DNP	5–0	DNP	2–0	0–1	–	1–0	0–0	7–2	DNP	1–2	1–0	3–0	2–0
vs. North Carolina	1–1	DNP	1–1	3–3	DNP	0–1	–	0–4	1–1	DNP	0–2	0–1	0–1	1–1
vs. NC State	DNP	DNP	0–0	5–0	DNP	0–0	4–0	–	1–0	2–0	0–2	1–2	4–1	1–1
vs. Notre Dame	1–3	0–2	1–2	4–1	0–3	2–7	1–1	0–1	–	1–1	DNP	DNP	DNP	1–3
vs. Pittsburgh	0–2	1–0	1–2	3–2	3–2	DNP	DNP	0–2	1–1	–	0–6	DNP	1–2	1–4
vs. Syracuse	DNP	5–1	DNP	3–2	2–1	2–1	2–0	2–0	DNP	6–0	–	4–0	4–0	2–2
vs. Virginia	1–1	1–1	1–1	DNP	1–1	0–1	1–0	2–1	DNP	DNP	0–4	–	0–3	2–0
vs. Virginia Tech	1–2	1–0	1–0	DNP	DNP	0–3	1–0	1–4	DNP	2–1	0–4	3–0	–	2–0
vs. Wake Forest	1–1	DNP	DNP	DNP	0–1	0–2	1–1	1–1	3–1	4–1	2–2	0–2	0–2	–
Total	0–6–4	7–2–1	2–5–3	9–0–1	3–5–2	2–7–1	5–0–5	2–5–3	7–1–2	6–3–1	0–9–1	3–3–4	4–6–0	4–2–4

=== Rankings ===
==== United Soccer ====
Legend
Increase in ranking
Decrease in ranking
Not ranked previous week

	Pre	Wk 1	Wk 2	Wk 3	Wk 4	Wk 5	Wk 6	Wk 7	Wk 8	Wk 9	Wk 10	Wk 11	Final
Boston College													
Clemson	25	19	11	9	8	8	8	9	7	8	8	7	3
Duke	4	4	10	14	15	16	17	22	23	RV	25т		
Florida State	6	2	2	5	4	3 (1)	2	2	1 (8)	1 (7)	1 (8)	1 (8)	1 (8)
Louisville													
Miami													
North Carolina	2	3	4	3	2	1 (7)	1 (8)	1 (8)	3	3	3	13	8
NC State		RV											
Notre Dame	3	12	15	11	13	10	10	11	11	12	11	9	16
Pittsburgh	14	21	21	22	RV	RV		RV	17	18	20	11	6
Syracuse													
Virginia	5	5	12	18	20	22							
Virginia Tech	RV	RV	RV										
Wake Forest				RV	RV		25	17		RV	RV	25	

==== Top Drawer Soccer ====
Legend
Increase in ranking
Decrease in ranking
Not ranked previous week

	Wk 1	Wk 2	Wk 3	Wk 4	Wk 5	Wk 6	Wk 7	Wk 8	Wk 9	Wk 10	Wk 11	Wk 12	Wk 13	Wk 14	Wk 15	Wk 16	Final
Boston College																	
Clemson					14	16	9	8	12	10	6	9	5	4	3	3	3
Duke	8	7	10	12	8	7	19										
Florida State	3	2	2	1	1	1	1	1	1	1	1	1	1	1	1	1	1
Louisville																	
Miami																	
North Carolina	2	3	5	5	4	3	2	2	4	7	8	14	12	11	6	6	6
NC State																	
Notre Dame	7	10	11	8	16	12	11	11	10	12	9	6	7	6	17	17	17
Pittsburgh	15	14	13	11	15	11	18	14	11	9	13	10	9	8	5	5	5
Syracuse																	
Virginia	6	6	7	7	10	15											
Virginia Tech																	
Wake Forest								25									

=== Players of the Week ===
Week	Offensive Player of the week	Defensive Player of the week	Reference
Week 1 – August 22	Taylor Huff – Florida State	Savy King – North Carolina	
Week 2 – August 29	Sarah Schupansky – Pittsburgh	Sam Meza – North Carolina	
Week 3 – September 5	Meredith McDermott – Virginia	Savy King (2) – North Carolina	
Week 4 – September 12	Avery Patterson – North Carolina	Halle Mackiewicz – Clemson	
Week 5 – September 19	Carina Lageyre – Duke	Maycee Bell – North Carolina	
Week 6 – September 26	Ally Sentnor – North Carolina	Mackenzie Duff – Clemson	
Week 7 – October 3	Kiki Van Zanten – Notre Dame	Laurel Ansbrow – Wake Forest	
Week 8 – October 10	Ellie Ospeck – Notre Dame	Ran Iwai – Florida State	
Week 9 – October 17	Onyi Echegini – Florida State	Makenna Morris – Clemson	
Week 10 – October 24	Renee Lyles – Clemson	Makenna Morris (2) – Clemson	
Week 10 – October 24	Onyi Echegini (2) – Florida State	Makenna Morris (2) – Clemson	
Week 11 – October 31	Emma Hiscock – Louisville	Lauren Flynn – Florida State	

== Postseason ==
=== ACC Tournament ===
Semifinals
1	Florida State	2
5	Pittsburgh	0
2	Notre Dame	2
3	Clemson	3

Final
1	Florida State	2
3	Clemson	1

=== NCAA tournament ===
Seed	School	Region	1st Round	2nd Round	Round of 16	Quarterfinals	Semifinals	Championship
1	Florida State	Florida State	W 5–0 vs. Morehead State – (Tallahassee, FL)	W 1–0 vs. Texas A&M – (Tallahassee, FL)	W 5–0 vs. Texas – (Tallahassee, FL)	W 3–0 vs. No. 11 Pittsburgh – (Tallahassee, FL)	W 2–0 vs. No. 7 Clemson – (Cary, NC)	W 5–1 vs. No. 3 Stanford – (Cary, NC)
1	Clemson	Clemson	W 2–0 vs. Radford – (Clemson, SC)	W 2–1 vs. Columbia – (Clemson, SC)	T 1–1 (5–3 PKs) vs. Georgia – (Clemson, SC)	W 2–1 vs. No. 5 Penn State – (Clemson, SC)	L 0–2 vs. No. 1 Florida State – (Cary, NC)	
3	North Carolina	BYU	W 3–1 vs. Towson – (Chapel Hill, NC)	W 1–0 vs. No. 24 Alabama – (Lubbock, TX)	W 1–0 @ No. 4 Texas Tech – (Lubbock, TX)	L 3–4 @ No. 6 BYU – (Provo, UT)		
3	Notre Dame	Florida State	W 2–0 vs. Valparaiso – (Notre Dame, IN)	L 2–3 vs. No. 8 Memphis – (Fayetteville, AR)				
7	Pittsburgh	Florida State	W 6–0 vs. Ohio State – (Pittsburgh, PA)	W 4–3 @ No. 10 Arkansas – (Fayetteville, AR)	W 3–0 vs No. 8 Memphis – (Fayetteville, AR)	L 0–3 vs. No. 1 Florida State – (Tallahassee, FL)		
W–L (%):			5–0–0 (1.000)	4–1–0 (.800)	3–0–1 (.875)	2–2–0 (.500)	1–1–0 (.500)	1–0–0 (1.000) Total: 16–4–1 (.786)

== Awards and honors ==
Conference end of season awards were released on November 1, 2023, prior to the semifinals of the ACC Tournament. Onyi Echegini was named Offensive Player of the Year, Eva Gaetino won Defensive Player of the Year for the second year in a row, and Brian Pensky was named Coach of the Year. A full list of award winners and All-ACC Teams is shown below.

=== ACC Awards ===
2023 ACC Women's Soccer Individual Awards
Award	Recipient(s)
Coach of the Year	Brian Pensky – Florida State
Offensive Player of the Year	Onyi Echegini – Florida State
Midfielder of the Year	Ally Sentnor – North Carolina
Defensive Player of the Year	Eva Gaetino – Notre Dame
Goalkeeper of the Year	Halle Mackiewicz – Clemson
Freshman of the Year	Jordynn Dudley – Florida State

2023 ACC Women's Soccer All-Conference Teams
First Team	Second Team	Third Team	All-Freshman Team
Hal Hershfelt – Clemson; Halle Mackiewicz – Clemson; Makenna Morris – Clemson; Jody Brown – Florida State; Jordynn Dudley – Florida State; Onyi Echegini – Florida State; Avery Patterson – North Carolina; Ally Sentnor – North Carolina; Eva Gaetino – Notre Dame; Kiki Van Zanten – Notre Dame; Sarah Schupansky – Pittsburgh	Kat Rader – Duke; Taylor Huff – Florida State; Leilanni Nesbeth – Florida State; Cristina Roque – Florida State; Maycee Bell – North Carolina; Savy King – North Carolina; Sam Meza – North Carolina; Leah Klenke – Notre Dame; Maddie Mercado – Notre Dame; Amanda West – Pittsburgh; Maggie Cagle – Virginia; Caiya Hanks – Wake Forest	Megan Bornkamp – Clemson; Caroline Conti – Clemson; Harper White – Clemson; Leah Freeman – Duke; Beata Olsson – Florida State; Lucy Roberts – Louisville; Jameese Joseph – NC State; Deborah Abiodun – Pittsburgh; Landy Mertz – Pittsburgh; Samiah Phiri – Pittsburgh; Natalie Mitchell – Virginia Tech	Dani Davis – Clemson; Tatum Short – Clemson; Jenna Tobia – Clemson; Cameron Roller – Duke; Jordynn Dudley – Florida State; Mimi Van Zanten – Florida State; Savy King – North Carolina; Evelyn Shores – North Carolina; Deborah Abiodun – Pittsburgh; Charlie Codd – Notre Dame; Morgan Roy – Notre Dame; Yuna McCormack – Virginia; Dempsey Brown – Wake Forest

=== All-Americans ===
2023 United Soccer Coaches All-Americans
First Team	Second Team	Third Team
Eva Gaetino – Notre Dame; Onyi Echegini – Florida State; Jordynn Dudley – Florida State	Halle Mackiewicz – Clemson; Makenna Morris – Clemson; Taylor Huff – Florida State; Jody Brown – Florida State	Cristina Roque – Florida State; Ally Sentnor – North Carolina; Avery Patterson – North Carolina

== 2024 NWSL Draft ==
The ACC had a conference record nineteen players drafted in the 2024 NWSL Draft. They had the top two picks selected, three of the top five picks, and six overall first round selections. Seven different schools had players selected in the draft.

FW	Forward	MF	Midfielder	DF	Defender	GK	Goalkeeper

Player	Team	Round	Pick #	Position	School
(United States) Ally Sentnor	Utah Royals	1	1	MF	North Carolina
(United States) Savy King	Bay FC	1	2	DF	North Carolina
(United States) Hal Hershfelt	Washington Spirit	1	5	MF	Clemson
(Bermuda) Leilanni Nesbeth	Chicago Red Stars	1	10	MF	Florida State
(United States) Makenna Morris	Washington Spirit	1	13	DF	Clemson
(United States) Maycee Bell	NJ/NY Gotham FC	1	14	DF	North Carolina
(United States) Jameese Joseph	Chicago Red Stars	2	15	FW	NC State
(United States) Lauren Flynn	Utah Royals	2	16	DF	Florida State
(United States) Sam Meza	Seattle Reign FC	2	17	MF	North Carolina
(United States) Avery Patterson	Houston Dash	2	19	FW	North Carolina
(Jamaica) Kiki Van Zanten	Houston Dash	2	21	FW	Notre Dame
(United States) Natalia Staude	North Carolina Courage	2	24	DF	Virginia
(United States) Maddie Mercado	Seattle Reign FC	2	27	FW	Notre Dame
(United States) Halle Mackiewicz	Kansas City Current	3	32	GK	Clemson
(Puerto Rico) Cristina Roque	Utah Royals	3	33	GK	Florida State
(United States) Caroline Conti	Bay FC	3	34	MF	Clemson
(Canada) Amanda West	Houston Dash	3	36	FW	Pittsburgh
(United States) Julia Dorsey	North Carolina Courage	3	40	DF	North Carolina
(United States) Landy Mertz	North Carolina Courage	4	52	FW	Pittsburgh
