= 2023 Pittsburgh Panthers women's soccer team =

American college soccer season

2023 Pittsburgh Panthers women's soccer

NCAA Tournament, Quarterfinals
- Conference: Atlantic Coast Conference
- U. Soc. Coaches poll: No. 6
- TopDrawerSoccer.com: No. 5
- Record: 17–6–1 (6–3–1 ACC)
- Head coach: Randy Waldrum (6th season)
- Assistant coaches: Ben Waldrum (6th season); Jesse Goleman (1st season)
- Home stadium: Ambrose Urbanic Field

2023 ACC women's soccer standings
	Conf.						Overall
Team	W		L		T	PCT	W		L		T	PCT
No. 1 Florida State ‍†‍‡‍^{y}	9	–	0	–	1	.950	22	–	0	–	1	.978
No. 16 Notre Dame ‍‍‍^{y}	7	–	1	–	2	.800	12	–	4	–	4	.700
No. 3 Clemson ‍‍‍^{y}	7	–	2	–	1	.750	18	–	4	–	4	.769
No. 8 North Carolina ‍‍‍^{y}	5	–	0	–	5	.750	13	–	2	–	8	.739
No. 6 Pittsburgh ‍‍‍^{y}	6	–	3	–	1	.650	17	–	6	–	1	.729
Wake Forest ‍‍‍	4	–	2	–	4	.600	10	–	3	–	5	.694
Virginia ‍‍‍	3	–	3	–	4	.500	8	–	3	–	6	.647
Virginia Tech ‍‍‍	4	–	6	–	0	.400	7	–	8	–	3	.472
Louisville ‍‍‍	3	–	5	–	2	.400	4	–	9	–	5	.361
Duke ‍‍‍	2	–	5	–	3	.350	6	–	7	–	3	.469
NC State ‍‍‍	2	–	5	–	3	.350	3	–	9	–	6	.333
Miami (FL) ‍‍‍	2	–	7	–	1	.250	3	–	10	–	4	.294
Boston College ‍‍‍	0	–	6	–	4	.200	3	–	9	–	6	.333
Syracuse ‍‍‍	0	–	9	–	1	.050	2	–	14	–	2	.167
† – Conference champion ‡ – 2023 ACC Tournament champion y – Invited to the NCAA Tournament; Source: The ACC; As of December 5, 2023; Rankings from United Soccer Coaches Poll

The 2023 Pittsburgh Panthers women's soccer team represented University of Pittsburgh during the 2023 NCAA Division I women's soccer season. The Panthers were led by head coach Randy Waldrum, in his sixth season. They played home games at Ambrose Urbanic Field. This was the team's 28th season playing organized women's college soccer and their 11th playing in the Atlantic Coast Conference.

The Panthers started off the season as the 14th ranked team in the United Soccer Coaches Poll and won their first six games before losing to number 21 Xavier. They would win their second game of the road trip to Cincinnati to finish the non-conference season 7–1–0. Despite the almost perfect record, the Panthers fell out of the rankings as the ACC season started. They did not play a Power 5 team in non-conference play. They began their ACC season with a win, loss, and draw, with the draw coming against 10th ranked Notre Dame. They followed with four straight wins, including two against 22nd ranked Duke and 17th ranked Wake Forest. This saw them return to the rankings and number seventeen. They lost the next two games against 1st ranked Florida State and 8th ranked Clemson before winning their final conference game.

The Panthers finished the season 17–6–1 overall and 6–3–1 in ACC play to finish in fifth place. As the fifth seed in the ACC Tournament they upset nationally third ranked North Carolina in overtime in the Quarterfinals. They could not advance further than the semifinals as they were defeated by Florida State. They received an at-large bid to the NCAA Tournament. As the seventh-seed in the Florida State Bracket, they defeated Ohio State 6–0 in the First Round and, second-seed Arkansas in the Second Round and sixth seed Memphis in the Round of 16. The victory against Memphis set up a third matchup with Florida State this season. The score in this matchup was the most lopsided of the three matches and the Panthers lost 3–0 to end their season. Their seventeen wins were the most in program history, and their six wins were the most in program history. This marked the second overall appearance in the NCAA tournament for the team.

== Previous season ==
The Panthers finished the season 14–5–3 overall and 5–3–2 in ACC play to finish in sixth place. As the sixth seed in the ACC Tournament they tied Notre Dame 1–1, but lost the ensuing penalty shoot-out 5–4. They received an at-large bid to the NCAA Tournament. As the fourth-seed in the Florida State Bracket, they defeated Buffalo in the first round and, fifth-seed Georgetown in the second round before traveling to first-seed Florida State in the round of 16. The Panthers' run would end in Tallahassee where they lost 3–0.

== Offseason ==
=== Departures ===
Departures
Name	Number	Pos.	Height	Year	Hometown	Reason for departure
Caitlyn Lazzarini	1	GK	5'8"	Senior	Nazareth, Pennsylvania	Graduated
Mackenzie Edwards	3	DF	5'7"	Senior	Jamison, Pennsylvania	Graduated
Leah Pais	8	FW	5'4"	Senior	Mississauga, Canada	Graduated
Emily Yaple	10	MF	5'5"	Junior	Erie, Pennsylvania	Transferred to Florida
Hailey Davidson	11	DF	5'4"	Graduate Student	Prosper, Texas	Graduated
Bri Hilsenteger	14	MF	5'3"	Sophomore	Austin, Texas	Transferred to Houston
Athalie Palomo	17	DF	5'3"	Senior	Irving, Texas	Graduated
Elena Hinkson	18	MF	5'7"	Sophomore	Mechanicsburg, Pennsylvania	Transferred to Florida Gulf Coast
Paige Califf	19	MF	5'8"	Freshman	Orange, California	Transferred to CSUN
Maddie Keister	20	MF	5'6"	Sophomore	Le Roy, New York	Transferred to Youngstown State
Krystyna Rytel	22	MF	5'8"	Senior	Pittsburgh, Pennsylvania	Graduated
Keely Brown	30	DF	5'8"	Freshman	Castle Pines, Colorado	Transferred to San Jose State
Misa Kasparcova	31	MF	5'3"	Freshman	Collegeville, Pennsylvania	Transferred to UMBC
Gabriella Beibart	33	GK	5'8"	Senior	Morristown, New Jersey	Graduated
Chantelle Parker	35	FW	5'7"	Junior	Milton, Canada	Transferred to Northern Illinois

=== Incoming transfers ===
Incoming transfers
Name	Number	Pos.	Height	Year	Hometown	Previous school
Emily Cooper	31	FW	5'10"	Sophomore	Pittsburgh, Pennsylvania	

=== Recruiting class ===
Name	Nationality	Hometown	Club	TDS Rating
Olivia Duray; MF	(United States)	Woodridge, Illinois	FC United (IL)	3/5 stars
Paige Dziedzic; FW	(United States)	Chicago, Illinois	Eclipse Select (IL)	3/5 stars
Emily Edwards; GK	(United States)	Holly Springs, North Carolina	North Carolina FC Youth	3/5 stars
Delaney Evers; MF	(United States)	Oakdale, Pennsylvania	Beadling SC	2/5 stars
Kaitlyn Killinger; FW	(United States)	Plum, Pennsylvania	Pittsburgh Hotspurs	2/5 stars
Olivia Lee; DF	(United States)	Scarsdale, New York	NYSC	3/5 stars
Emma Rhoades; MF	(United States)	Fenton, Michigan	Nationals (GA)	3/5 stars
Kaley Simqu; DF	(United States)	Pittsburgh, Pennsylvania	Pittsburgh Hotspurs	2/5 stars
Sage Stelzer; DF	(United States)	Blue Bell, Pennsylvania	Penn Fusion SA	3/5 stars
Emma Van Meter; GK	(United States)	Pittsburgh, Pennsylvania	Pittsburgh Riverhounds	3/5 stars
Lucia Wells; FW	(United States)	Pittsburgh, Pennsylvania	Pittsburgh Riverhounds	3/5 stars

== Squad ==
=== Roster ===
As of November 29, 2023

Note: Flags indicate national team as defined under FIFA eligibility rules; some limited exceptions apply. Players may hold more than one non-FIFA nationality.

No.	Pos.	Nation	Player
0	GK	USA	Ellie Breech
2	DF	USA	Haylee Mersereau
3	DF	USA	Lanie Fuchs
4	MF	USA	Ellie Coffield
5	FW	USA	Sarah Schupansky
6	MF	USA	Landy Mertz
7	MF	USA	Fleming Dean
8	MF	NGA	Deborah Abiodun
9	FW	CAN	Amanda West
10	MF	CAN	Keera Melenhorst
11	DF	USA	Mackenzie Evers
12	MF	CAN	Anna Bout
13	DF	USA	Ashley Moon
14	FW	USA	Evie Craven
15	MF	CAN	Chloe Minas
16	FW	USA	Lucia Wells
17	FW	USA	Aliya Gomes

No.	Pos.	Nation	Player
18	FW	USA	Paige Dzeidzic
19	FW	USA	Sofia Doheny
20	DF	USA	Olivia Lee
21	DF	USA	Katie Zailski
22	FW	USA	Delaney Evers
23	FW	USA	Samiah Phiri
24	MF	USA	Emma Rhoades
25	GK	USA	Emily Edwards
26	FW	USA	Margaret Wilde
27	MF	USA	Briana Rodriguez
28	DF	USA	Kaley Simqu
29	MF	USA	Olivia Duray
30	FW	USA	Kaitlyn Killinger
31	FW	USA	Emily Cooper
32	DF	USA	Ashton Gordon
33	GK	USA	Emma Van Meter
35	DF	USA	Sage Stelzer

=== Team management ===
Position	Staff
Head coach	Randy Waldrum
Associate Head Coach	Ben Waldrum
Assistant Coach	Jesse Goleman

== Schedule ==
Date Time, TV	Rank^{#}	Opponent^{#}	Result	Record	Site (Attendance) City, State
Exhibition
August 6*; 7:00 p.m.	No. 14	at West Virginia	None Reported	—	Dick Dlesk Soccer Stadium; Morgantown, WV
August 10*; 3:00 p.m.	No. 14	Niagara	W 6–0	—	Ambrose Urbanic Field; Pittsburgh, PA
Non-conference regular season
August 17*; 7:00 p.m., YouTube	No. 14	at Buffalo	W 2–1	1–0–0	UB Stadium (375); Buffalo, NY
August 20*; 1:00 p.m., ACCN	No. 14	Drexel	W 4–1	2–0–0	Ambrose Urbanic Field (657); Pittsburgh, PA
August 24*; 7:00 p.m., BoxCast	No. 21	at Kent State	W 1–0	3–0–0	Zoeller Field (498); Kent, OH
August 27*; 1:00 p.m., ACCNX	No. 21	Bucknell	W 5–0	4–0–0	Ambrose Urbanic Field (786); Pittsburgh, PA
August 31*; 7:00 p.m., ACCNX	No. 21	Duquesne	W 6–1	5–0–0	Ambrose Urbanic Field (939); Pittsburgh, PA
September 3*; 4:00 p.m., ACCNX	No. 21	Bowling Green	W 5–1	6–0–0	Ambrose Urbanic Field (733); Pittsburgh, PA
September 7*; 7:00 p.m., FloFC	No. 22	at No. 21 Xavier	L 1–2	6–1–0	Corcoran Field (726); Cincinnati, OH
September 10*; 1:00 p.m., ESPN+	No. 22	at Cincinnati	W 2–1	7–1–0	Gettler Stadium (280); Cincinnati, OH
ACC Regular season
September 17; 2:00 p.m., ACCNX		at NC State	W 2–0	8–1–0 (1–0–0)	Dail Soccer Field (331); Raleigh, NC
September 21; 8:00 p.m., ACCN		at Louisville	L 2–3	8–2–0 (1–1–0)	Lynn Stadium (279); Louisville, KY
September 24; 1:00 p.m., ACCNX		No. 10 Notre Dame	T 1–1	8–2–1 (1–1–1)	Ambrose Urbanic Field (973); Pittsburgh, PA
September 30; 7:00 p.m., ACCNX		Boston College	W 2–0	9–2–1 (2–1–1)	Ambrose Urbanic Field (858); Pittsburgh, PA
October 5; 7:00 p.m., ACCNX		No. 22 Duke	W 2–1	10–2–1 (3–1–1)	Ambrose Urbanic Field (958); Pittsburgh, PA
October 8; 1:00 p.m., ACCNX		No. 17 Wake Forest	W 4–1	11–2–1 (4–1–1)	Ambrose Urbanic Field (545); Pittsburgh, PA
October 14; 1:00 p.m., ACCNX	No. 17	at Syracuse	W 6–0	12–2–1 (5–1–1)	SU Soccer Stadium (187); Syracuse, NY
October 19; 7:00 p.m., ACCNX	No. 18	at No. 1 Florida State	L 2–3	12–3–1 (5–2–1)	Seminole Soccer Complex (1,125); Tallahassee, FL
October 22; 2:00 p.m., ACCN	No. 18	at No. 9 Clemson	L 0–1	12–4–1 (5–3–1)	Riggs Field (867); Clemson, SC
October 26; 7:00 p.m., ACCNX	No. 20	Virginia Tech	W 2–1	13–4–1 (6–3–1)	Ambrose Urbanic Field (1,280); Pittsburgh, PA
ACC tournament
October 29; 8:00 p.m., ACCN	(5) No. 20	at (4) No. 3 North Carolina; First Round	W 2–1 ^{2OT}	14–4–1	Dorrance Field (1,174); Chapel Hill, NC
November 2; 8:00 p.m., ACCN	(5) No. 11	vs. (1) No. 1 Florida State; Semifinal	L 0–2	14–5–1	WakeMed Soccer Park (678); Cary, NC
NCAA tournament
November 11; 7:00 p.m., ESPN+	(7) No. 11	Ohio State; First Round	W 6–0	15–5–1	Ambrose Urbanic Field (1,309); Pittsburgh, PA
November 17; 7:30 p.m., ESPN+	(7) No. 11	at (2) No. 10 Arkansas; Second Round	W 4–3	16–5–1	Razorback Field (2,215); Fayetteville, AR
November 19; 7:00 p.m., ESPN+	(7) No. 11	at (6) No. 8 Memphis; Round of 16	W 3–0	17–5–1	Razorback Field (719); Fayetteville, AR
November 24; 5:30 p.m., ESPN+	(7) No. 11	at (1) No. 1 Florida State; Quarterfinals	L 0–3	17–6–1	Seminole Soccer Complex (2,000); Tallahassee, FL
*Non-conference game. ^{#}Rankings from United Soccer Coaches. (#) Tournament seedings in parentheses. All times are in Eastern.

== Awards and honors ==
Recipient	Award	Date	Ref.
Amanda West	Preseason All-ACC Team	August 10	
Sarah Schupansky	ACC Offensive Player of the Week	August 29	
Sarah Schupansky	All-ACC First Team	November 1	
Amanda West	All-ACC Second Team	November 1	
Deborah Abiodun	All-ACC Third Team	November 1	
Landy Mertz	All-ACC Third Team	November 1	
Samiah Phiri	All-ACC Third Team	November 1	
Amanda West	All-ACC Tournament Team	November 5	
Landy Mertz	All-ACC Tournament Team	November 5	

== Rankings ==
Ranking movements Legend: ██ Increase in ranking ██ Decrease in ranking — = Not ranked RV = Received votes
	Week																
Poll	Pre	1	2	3	4	5	6	7	8	9	10	11	12	13	14	15	Final
United Soccer	14	21	21	22	RV	RV	—	RV	17	18	20	11	Not released				6
TopDrawer Soccer	15	14	13	11	15	11	18	14	11	9	13	10	9	8	5	5	5

== 2024 NWSL Draft ==
Pittsburgh had two players selected in the 2024 NWSL Draft. This was the first time in program history that Pittsburgh had any players selected in the NWSL Draft.

Player	Team	Round	Pick #	Position
(Canada) Amanda West	Houston Dash	3	36	FW
(United States) Landy Mertz	North Carolina Courage	4	52	FW
