= 2023 North Carolina Tar Heels women's soccer team =

American college soccer season

2023 North Carolina Tar Heels women's soccer

NCAA Tournament, Quarterfinals
- Conference: Atlantic Coast Conference
- U. Soc. Coaches poll: No. 8
- TopDrawerSoccer.com: No. 6
- Record: 13–2–8 (5–0–5 ACC)
- Head coach: Anson Dorrance (47th season)
- Assistant coaches: Damon Nahas (8th season); Nathan Thackeray (2nd season); Alexandra Kimball (1st season)
- Home stadium: Dorrance Field

2023 ACC women's soccer standings
	Conf.						Overall
Team	W		L		T	PCT	W		L		T	PCT
No. 1 Florida State ‍†‍‡‍^{y}	9	–	0	–	1	.950	22	–	0	–	1	.978
No. 16 Notre Dame ‍‍‍^{y}	7	–	1	–	2	.800	12	–	4	–	4	.700
No. 3 Clemson ‍‍‍^{y}	7	–	2	–	1	.750	18	–	4	–	4	.769
No. 8 North Carolina ‍‍‍^{y}	5	–	0	–	5	.750	13	–	2	–	8	.739
No. 6 Pittsburgh ‍‍‍^{y}	6	–	3	–	1	.650	17	–	6	–	1	.729
Wake Forest ‍‍‍	4	–	2	–	4	.600	10	–	3	–	5	.694
Virginia ‍‍‍	3	–	3	–	4	.500	8	–	3	–	6	.647
Virginia Tech ‍‍‍	4	–	6	–	0	.400	7	–	8	–	3	.472
Louisville ‍‍‍	3	–	5	–	2	.400	4	–	9	–	5	.361
Duke ‍‍‍	2	–	5	–	3	.350	6	–	7	–	3	.469
NC State ‍‍‍	2	–	5	–	3	.350	3	–	9	–	6	.333
Miami (FL) ‍‍‍	2	–	7	–	1	.250	3	–	10	–	4	.294
Boston College ‍‍‍	0	–	6	–	4	.200	3	–	9	–	6	.333
Syracuse ‍‍‍	0	–	9	–	1	.050	2	–	14	–	2	.167
† – Conference champion ‡ – 2023 ACC Tournament champion y – Invited to the NCAA Tournament; Source: The ACC; As of December 5, 2023; Rankings from United Soccer Coaches Poll

The 2023 North Carolina Tar Heels women's soccer team represented the University of North Carolina at Chapel Hill during the 2023 NCAA Division I women's soccer season. It was the 47th season of the university fielding a program. The Tar Heels were led by 47th year head coach Anson Dorrance and played their home games at Dorrance Field in Chapel Hill, North Carolina.

The Tar Heels started off the season as the 2nd ranked team in the United Soccer Coaches Poll. They would draw two of their three opening games, one against tenth-ranked Penn State and another against unranked Wisconsin. They would then play four more ranked teams during their non-conference schedule, defeating number 24 USC, number 8 Arkansas and number 10 South Carolina and drawing with number 12 Alabama. They finished their non-conference season 5–0–3 and played seven Power 5 opponents. Their ACC season started with two wins before a draw against number three Florida State. Two more wins were followed by three draws. The Tar Heels finished the season with a dominant 6–1 win against Syracuse and a disappointing draw with last-place Boston College.

The Tar Heels finished the season 13–2–8 and 5–0–5 in ACC play to finish in fourth place. As the fourth seed in the ACC Tournament, they hosted Pittsburgh in the first round and were upset 1–2 in overtime. They received an at-large bid to the 2023 NCAA Division I women's soccer tournament where they were the third-seed in the BYU Bracket. They defeated Towson in the first round, six-seed Alabama in a second-round rematch, and second-seed Texas Tech in the Round of 16. They then had to travel to Provo, Utah to face one-seed BYU in the Quarterfinals. The Tar Heels raced out to a 3–0 lead in the first twenty minutes of the match, but surrendered four goals, three in the last ten minutes to lose 3–4 to end their season.

== Previous season ==
The Tar Heels finished the season 20–5–1 and 8–2–0 in ACC play to finish in a tie for first place. As the first seed in the ACC Tournament, they hosted rival Duke in the semifinal after receiving a first-round bye and drew 0–0. The Tar Heels won the ensuing penalty shoot-out 7–6 to advance to the final where they lost to Florida State. They received an at-large bid to the 2022 NCAA Division I women's soccer tournament where they were the second seed in the Notre Dame Bracket. They defeated Old Dominion in the first round, seven-seed Georgia in the second round, and six-seed BYU in the Round of 16. They then had to travel to Notre Dame to face one-seed Notre Dame. The Tar Heels advanced with a 2–0 win to the College Cup, where they would face Florida State again. The Tar Heels won the rematch of the ACC Tournament Final 3–2 and advanced to the national title game against UCLA. North Carolina lost a tight match 3–2, with UCLA scoring goals in the 80th and 89th minutes to force overtime and scoring the game winner in the 107th minute.

== Offseason ==
=== Departures ===
Departures
Name	Number	Pos.	Height	Year	Hometown	Reason for departure
Abby Allen	2	DF	5'9"	Junior	Austin, Texas	Transferred to Texas
Ruby Grant	3	MF	5'3"	Sophomore	London, England	Signed professional contract with Häcken
Rachel Jones	10	FW/MF	5'2"	Graduate Student	Lawrenceville, Georgia	Graduated
Lauren Wrigley	11	MF	5'3"	Sophomore	Newton, New Jersey	Transferred to Maryland
Aleigh Gambone	16	MF/FW	5'3"	Senior	Clifton, Virginia	Graduated
Marz Josephson	17	GK	5'7"	Senior	Apex, North Carolina	Graduated
Libby Moore	20	MF	5'3"	Senior	Wilmington, North Carolina	Graduated
Tori Hansen	22	DF	5'10"	Senior	Raleigh, North Carolina	Graduated; Drafted 25th overall in the 2023 NWSL Draft
Maggie Pierce	28	MF	5'4"	Senior	Cary, North Carolina	Graduated; signed professional contract with Shelbourne
Emily Murphy	35	FW	5'6"	Sophomore	Windsor, England	Transferred to Wake Forest
Sarah Bayer	82	FW	5'4"	Graduate Student	Merrick, New York	Graduated
Madelyn Galbus	98	FW	5'7"	Freshman	Wilmington, Delaware	Transferred to Syracuse

=== Incoming transfers ===
Incoming transfers
Name	Number	Pos.	Height	Year	Hometown	Previous school
Alexa Wojnovich	44	DF/MF	5'7"	Graduate Student	Chapel Hill, North Carolina	Villanova

=== Recruiting class ===
Name	Nationality	Hometown	Club	TDS Rating
Abby Gundry; GK	(United States)	Wake Forest, North Carolina	North Carolina Courage	4/5 stars
Savannah King; DF	(United States)	West Hills, California	Slammers FC HB Koge	5/5 stars
Mia Oliaro; FW	(United States)	Chapel Hill, North Carolina	North Carolina Courage	4/5 stars
Melina Rebimbas; FW	(United States)	Warren, New Jersey	PDA	5/5 stars
Evelyn Shores; DF	(United States)	Atlanta, GA	Tophat SC	5/5 stars
Ella Smith; FW	(United States)	Charlotte, North Carolina	Charlotte Independence SC	3/5 stars
Olivia Thomas; FW	(United States)	Grosse Pointe, Michigan	Michigan Hawks	4/5 stars

== Squad ==
=== Roster ===
As of November 29, 2023

Note: Flags indicate national team as defined under FIFA eligibility rules; some limited exceptions apply. Players may hold more than one non-FIFA nationality.

No.	Pos.	Nation	Player
0	GK	USA	Nona Reason
2	DF	USA	Evelyn Shores
3	DF	USA	Savy King
4	DF	USA	Paige Tolentino
5	FW	USA	Maddie Dahlien
6	MF	USA	Emerson Elgin
7	DF	USA	Julia Dorsey
8	FW	USA	Emily Moxley
9	FW	USA	Tori DellaPeruta
10	MF	USA	Samantha Meza
11	MF	USA	Makenna Dominguez
12	DF	USA	Sydney Cheesman
13	FW	USA	Isabel Cox
14	MF	USA	Kai Hayes
15	FW	USA	Avery Patterson
16	MF	USA	Melina Rebimbas
18	MF	USA	Bella Sember

No.	Pos.	Nation	Player
19	MF	USA	Emily Colton
20	FW	USA	Olivia Thomas
21	FW	USA	Ally Sentnor
22	FW	USA	Mia Oliaro
23	MF	USA	Maci Teater
24	FW	USA	Talia DellaPeruta
25	DF	USA	Maycee Bell
26	FW	USA	Kate Faasse
30	DF	USA	Kayleigh Herr
31	MF	USA	Ella Smith
32	GK	USA	Emmie Allen
33	MF	USA	Riley Quinlan
34	DF	USA	Tessa Dellarose
39	FW	USA	Asha Means
40	GK	USA	Abby Gundry
44	DF	USA	Alexa Wojnovich

=== Team management ===
Position	Staff
Athletic Director	Bubba Cunningham
Head coach	Anson Dorrance
Associate head coach	Damon Nahas
Assistant Coach	Nathan Thackeray
Assistant Coach	Alexandra Kimball
General Manager	Chris Ducar
Director of Operations	Tom Sander

== Schedule ==
Date Time, TV	Rank^{#}	Opponent^{#}	Result	Record	Site (Attendance) City, State
Exhibition
August 7; 1:00 p.m.	No. 2	College of Charleston	W 8–1	–	Dorrance Field; Chapel Hill, North Carolina
August 12; 6:00 p.m.	No. 2	East Carolina	W 2–0	–	Dorrance Field; Chapel Hill, North Carolina
Non-conference Regular season
August 17; 7:00 p.m., BTN	No. 2	at No. 10 Penn State	T 0–0	0–0–1	Jeffrey Field (3,102); University Park, Pennsylvania
August 20; 1:00 p.m., ACCNX	No. 2	California	W 3–1	1–0–1	Dorrance Field (3,792); Chapel Hill, North Carolina
August 24; 4:00 p.m., ACCNX	No. 3	Wisconsin	T 0–0	1–0–2	Dorrance Field (3,335); Chapel Hill, North Carolina
August 27; 1:00 p.m., ACCNX	No. 3	No. 24 USC	W 4–0	2–0–2	Dorrance Field (2,869); Chapel Hill, North Carolina
August 31; 7:00 p.m., ACCNX	No. 4	Gardner–Webb	W 5–0	3–0–2	Dorrance Field (2,751); Chapel Hill, North Carolina
September 3; 2:00 p.m., ACCN	No. 4	No. 8т Arkansas	W 3–1	4–0–2	Dorrance Field (2,732); Chapel Hill, North Carolina
September 7; 7:00 p.m., ESPNU	No. 3	at No. 10 South Carolina	W 2–1	5–0–2	Stone Stadium (4,550); Columbia, South Carolina
September 10; 7:00 p.m., ESPNU	No. 3	at No. 12 Alabama	T 1–1	5–0–3	Alabama Soccer Stadium (1,421); Tuscaloosa, Alabama
ACC regular season
September 15; 3:30 p.m., ACCNX	No. 2	Virginia Tech	W 1–0	6–0–3 (1–0–0)	Dorrance Field (4,298); Chapel Hill, North Carolina
September 21; 7:00 p.m., ACCNX	No. 1	at No. 22 Virginia	W 1–0	7–0–3 (2–0–0)	Klöckner Stadium (2,674); Charlottesville, Virginia
September 24; 12:00 p.m., ESPNU	No. 1	No. 3 Florida State	T 3–3	7–0–4 (2–0–1)	Dorrance Field (4,079); Chapel Hill, North Carolina
September 30; 7:00 p.m., ACCNX	No. 1	at NC State; Rivalry	W 4–0	8–0–4 (3–0–1)	Dail Soccer Field (3,972); Raleigh, North Carolina
October 5; 7:00 p.m., ACCNX	No. 1	Miami (FL)	W 1–0	9–0–4 (4–0–1)	Dorrance Field (2,892); Chapel Hill, North Carolina
October 8; 4:00 p.m., ACCN	No. 1	at No. 22 Duke; Rivalry	T 1–1	9–0–5 (4–0–2)	Koskinen Stadium (3,467); Durham, North Carolina
October 13; 7:00 p.m., ACCNX	No. 3	at Wake Forest	T 1–1	9–0–6 (4–0–3)	Spry Stadium (1,280); Winston-Salem, North Carolina
October 19; 8:00 p.m., ACCN	No. 3	No. 12 Notre Dame	T 1–1	9–0–7 (4–0–4)	Dorrance Field (2,378); Chapel Hill, North Carolina
October 22; 1:00 p.m., ACCNX	No. 3	Syracuse	W 6–1	10–0–7 (5–0–4)	Dorrance Field (4,175); Chapel Hill, North Carolina
October 26; 7:00 p.m., ACCNX	No. 3	at Boston College	T 1–1	10–0–8 (5–0–5)	Newton Campus Soccer Field (1,268); Chestnut Hill, Massachusetts
ACC tournament
October 29; 8:00 p.m., ACCN	(4) No. 3	(5) No. 20 Pittsburgh; First round	L 1–2 ^{2OT}	10–1–8	Dorrance Field (1,174); Chapel Hill, North Carolina
NCAA tournament
November 10; 6:00 p.m., ESPN+	(3) No. 13	Towson; First round	W 3–1	11–1–8	Dorrance Field (1,889); Chapel Hill, North Carolina
November 17; 3:30 p.m., ESPN+	(3) No. 13	vs. (6) No. 24 Alabama; Second round	W 1–0	12–1–8	John Walker Soccer Complex (2,346); Lubbock, Texas
November 19; 2:00 p.m., ESPN+	(3) No. 13	at (2) No. 4 Texas Tech; Round of 16	W 1–0	13–1–8	John Walker Soccer Complex (2,558); Lubbock, Texas
November 24; 8:00 p.m., ESPN+	(3) No. 13	at (1) No. 6 BYU; Quarterfinals	L 3–4	13–2–8	South Field (3,487); Provo, Utah
*Non-conference game. ^{#}Rankings from United Soccer Coaches. (#) Tournament seedings in parentheses. All times are in Eastern.

== Awards and honors ==
Recipient	Award	Date	Ref.
Maycee Bell	Pre-season All-ACC Team	August 10	
Sam Meza	Pre-season All-ACC Team	August 10	
Ally Sentnor	Pre-season All-ACC Team	August 10	
Sam Meza	Hermann Trophy Preseason Watchlist	August 17	
Savy King	ACC Defensive Player of the Week	August 22	
Sam Meza	ACC Defensive Player of the Week	August 29	
Savy King	ACC Defensive Player of the Week	September 5	
Avery Patterson	ACC Offensive Player of the Week	September 12	
Maycee Bell	ACC Defensive Player of the Week	September 19	
Ally Sentnor	ACC Offensive Player of the Week	September 26	
Ally Sentnor	ACC Midfielder of the Year	November 1	
Avery Patterson	All-ACC First Team	November 1	
Ally Sentnor	All-ACC First Team	November 1	
Maycee Bell	All-ACC Second Team	November 1	
Savy King	All-ACC Second Team	November 1	
Sam Meza	All-ACC Second Team	November 1	
Savy King	All-ACC Freshman Team	November 1	
Evelyn Shores	All-ACC Freshman Team	November 1	
Ally Sentnor	United Soccer Coaches All-America Third Team	December 1	
Avery Patterson	United Soccer Coaches All-America Third Team	December 1	

== Rankings ==
Ranking movements Legend: ██ Increase in ranking ██ Decrease in ranking ( ) = First-place votes
	Week																
Poll	Pre	1	2	3	4	5	6	7	8	9	10	11	12	13	14	15	Final
United Soccer	2	3	4	3	2	1 (7)	1 (8)	1 (8)	3	3	3	13	Not released				8
TopDrawer Soccer	2	3	5	5	4	3	2	2	4	7	8	14	12	11	6	6	6

== 2024 NWSL Draft ==
North Carolina had six players selected in the 2024 NWSL Draft. The six players tied the NWSL record for number of selections from a single school in a draft. North Carolina also had the first and second overall picks for the second time in school history.

Player	Team	Round	Pick #	Position
(United States) Ally Sentnor	Utah Royals	1	1	MF
(United States) Savy King	Bay FC	1	2	DF
(United States) Maycee Bell	NJ/NY Gotham FC	1	14	DF
(United States) Sam Meza	Seattle Reign FC	2	17	MF
(United States) Avery Patterson	Houston Dash	2	19	FW
(United States) Julia Dorsey	North Carolina Courage	3	40	DF
