= 2023 Florida State Seminoles women's soccer team =

2023 Florida State Seminoles women's soccer

National Champions ACC Tournament Champions ACC Regular Season Champions

NCAA Tournament, College Cup
- Conference: Atlantic Coast Conference
- U. Soc. Coaches poll: No. 1
- TopDrawerSoccer.com: No. 1
- Record: 22–0–1 (9–0–1 ACC)
- Head coach: Brian Pensky (2nd season)
- Assistant coaches: Bobby Shuttleworth (2nd season); Aaron Brunner (2nd season); Andrew Hudson (1st season)
- Home stadium: Seminole Soccer Complex

2023 ACC women's soccer standings
	Conf.						Overall
Team	W		L		T	PCT	W		L		T	PCT
No. 1 Florida State ‍†‍‡‍^{y}	9	–	0	–	1	.950	22	–	0	–	1	.978
No. 16 Notre Dame ‍‍‍^{y}	7	–	1	–	2	.800	12	–	4	–	4	.700
No. 3 Clemson ‍‍‍^{y}	7	–	2	–	1	.750	18	–	4	–	4	.769
No. 8 North Carolina ‍‍‍^{y}	5	–	0	–	5	.750	13	–	2	–	8	.739
No. 6 Pittsburgh ‍‍‍^{y}	6	–	3	–	1	.650	17	–	6	–	1	.729
Wake Forest ‍‍‍	4	–	2	–	4	.600	10	–	3	–	5	.694
Virginia ‍‍‍	3	–	3	–	4	.500	8	–	3	–	6	.647
Virginia Tech ‍‍‍	4	–	6	–	0	.400	7	–	8	–	3	.472
Louisville ‍‍‍	3	–	5	–	2	.400	4	–	9	–	5	.361
Duke ‍‍‍	2	–	5	–	3	.350	6	–	7	–	3	.469
NC State ‍‍‍	2	–	5	–	3	.350	3	–	9	–	6	.333
Miami (FL) ‍‍‍	2	–	7	–	1	.250	3	–	10	–	4	.294
Boston College ‍‍‍	0	–	6	–	4	.200	3	–	9	–	6	.333
Syracuse ‍‍‍	0	–	9	–	1	.050	2	–	14	–	2	.167
† – Conference champion ‡ – 2023 ACC Tournament champion y – Invited to the NCAA Tournament; Source: The ACC; As of December 5, 2023; Rankings from United Soccer Coaches Poll

The 2023 Florida State Seminoles women's soccer team represented Florida State University during the 2023 NCAA Division I women's soccer season. This was the 29th season of the university fielding a women's soccer program. The Seminoles were led by second-year head coach Brian Pensky, and played their home games at Seminole Soccer Complex.

The Seminoles started the season well by going 5–0 in non-conference play. They scored victories over three Power 5 schools, including eighth ranked TCU. They also won their in-state rivalry matchup with Florida. Their success carried over into ACC play as they began the regular season with a win over eighth ranked Clemson. They won their next game before a tie with then top-ranked North Carolina. The Seminoles would reach the number one ranking after winning their next three games. Once they held the number one ranking, they did not look back, winning their last four conference games to finish 9–0–1 in ACC play. Their final four game stretch included wins against two ranked teams, eleventh ranked Notre Dame and eighteenth ranked Pittsburgh.

The Seminoles entered the ACC Tournament undefeated and as the number one seed. After their first round bye, they defeated Pittsburgh in a regular season rematch to reach the Final. There they again faced off against Clemson, who they defeated 2–1 to win their fourth consecutive ACC Tournament title. As tournament champions, they received an automatic bid to the NCAA Tournament and were the first seed in the Florida State Bracket and the top overall seed in the tournament. They defeated Morehead State in the First Round, Texas A&M in the Second Round, Texas in the Third Round, Pittsburgh again in the Quarterfinals, Clemson again in the Semifinals, and Stanford in the Final.

Their 5–1 victory in the championship won the team their fourth overall title, all of which have come since 2014. Stanford's 36 game streak of allowing one or fewer goals was snapped and this was the first match where the Cardinal allowed five or more goals in a game since 1996. This was the first national championship match between two undefeated teams and Florida State became the first undefeated champion since Stanford in 2011. Their twenty two wins were the third most in program history behind 2013 and their first national title season in 2014. It was their second undefeated season in program history with the other being the 2020 season. It was the Seminoles third undefeated conference season, following 2014 and 2020. Onyi Echegini went on to win the Hermann Trophy, the fourth in program history. Three players from the team were selected in the NWSL Draft.

== Previous season ==
The Seminoles finished the season 17–3–3 and 8–2–0 in ACC play to finish in a tie for first place. As the second seed in the ACC Tournament, they received a bye into the Semifinals where they hosted Notre Dame. The match ended in a 3–3 draw and Florida State won the ensuing penalty shoot-out 4–2 to advance to the Final. In the Final, they defeated North Carolina to successfully defend their ACC Tournament title. As tournament champions, they received an automatic bid to the NCAA Tournament and were the first seed in the Florida State Bracket. They defeated Florida Gulf Coast in the First Round, eight-seed LSU in the Second Round, and four-seed Pittsburgh in the Round of 16. They hosted third-seed Arkansas in the Quarterfinals and won 1–0. This set up a rematch with North Carolina in the Semifinals. This time, North Carolina came out on top 3–2 to end the Seminoles' season.

== Offseason ==
=== Departures ===
Departures
Name	Number	Pos.	Height	Year	Hometown	Reason for departure
Jenna Nighswonger	2	FW	5'4"	Senior	Huntington Beach, California	Graduated; drafted 4th overall in the 2023 NWSL Draft
Summer Denigan	5	MF	5'4"	Freshman	Union, Kentucky	Transferred to Georgia
Heather Payne	12	MF	5'7"	Senior	Ballinasloe, Ireland	Graduated
Emma Bissell	17	MF	5'7"	Sophomore	Chester, England	Signed professional contract with Everton
Amelia Horton	19	FW	5'3"	Sophomore	Olathe, Kansas	—
Mia Justus	23	GK	5'9"	Sophomore	Lakewood, Ohio	Transferred to Texas
Clara Robbins	26	MF	5'7"	Graduate Student	Stafford, Virginia	Graduated; drafted 9th overall in the 2023 NWSL Draft
Melina Descary	88	MF	5'7"	Freshman	Montreal, Canada	Transferred to South Alabama

=== Incoming transfers ===
Incoming transfers
Name	Number	Pos.	Height	Year	Hometown	Previous school
Lily Farkas	2	FW	5'6"	Senior	Kansas City, Missouri	Michigan
Taylor Huff	3	MF	5'8"	Junior	Mansfield, Ohio	Tennessee
Claire Rain	22	DF	5'9"	Junior	Tampa, Florida	Tennessee
Leah Pais	30	FW	5'4"	Senior	Mississauga, Ontario	Pittsburgh

=== Recruiting class ===
Name	Nationality	Hometown	Club	TDS Rating
Jordynn Dudley; FW	(United States)	Milton, Georgia	United Futbol Academy (GA)	4/5 stars
Peyton Nourse; MF	(United States)	Denver, Colorado	Colorado Rush	4/5 stars
Maggie Taitano; MF	(United States)	Carlsbad, California	San Diego Surf	4/5 stars
Adelyn Todd; GK	(United States)	Littleton, Colorado	Real Colorado	4/5 stars
Mimi Van Zanten; DF	(United States)	Kildeer, Illinois	Eclipse Select (IL)	4/5 stars

== Squad ==
=== Roster ===
As of December 5, 2023

Note: Flags indicate national team as defined under FIFA eligibility rules; some limited exceptions apply. Players may hold more than one non-FIFA nationality.

No.	Pos.	Nation	Player
0	FW	USA	Olivia Garcia
1	GK	PUR	Cristina Roque
2	FW	USA	Lily Farkas
3	MF	USA	Taylor Huff
4	MF	USA	Maggie Taitano
6	MF	NGR	Onyi Echegini
7	MF	JPN	Ran Iwai
8	DF	USA	Lauren Flynn
9	FW	SWE	Beata Olsson
10	FW	JAM	Jody Brown
11	FW	USA	Jordynn Dudley

No.	Pos.	Nation	Player
13	FW	BER	LeiLanni Nesbeth
14	MF	USA	Peyton Nourse
15	MF	USA	Kaitlyn Zipay
16	MF	USA	Sophia Nguyen
17	MF	JAM	Mimi Van Zanten
18	MF	POR	Maria Alagoa
20	DF	USA	Heather Gilchrist
21	FW	USA	Olivia Lebdaoui
22	DF	USA	Claire Rain
23	GK	USA	Adelyn Todd
30	FW	CAN	Leah Pais

=== Team management ===
Position	Staff
Athletic Director	Michael Alford
Head coach	Brian Pensky
Assistant Coach	Bobby Shuttleworth
Assistant Coach	Aaron Brunner
Assistant Coach	Andrew Hudson
Director of Operations	Sarah Buckley

== Schedule ==
Date Time, TV	Rank^{#}	Opponent^{#}	Result	Record	Site (Attendance) City, State
Exhibition
August 11*; 2:00 p.m.	No. 6	No. 24 UCF	W 4–3	—	UCF Soccer and Track Stadium; Orlando, FL
Non-conference Regular season
August 17*; 8:00 p.m., SECN	No. 6	at Texas A&M	W 2–1	1–0–0	Ellis Field (1,577); College Station, TX
August 20*; 8:00 p.m., ESPN+	No. 6	at No. 8 TCU	W 2–0	2–0–0	Garvey-Rosenthal Stadium (1,424); Fort Worth, TX
September 3*; 2:00 p.m., ACCNX	No. 2	South Florida	W 5–1	3–0–0	Seminole Soccer Complex (1,232); Tallahassee, FL
September 7*; 6:00 p.m., ESPN+	No. 5	at North Florida	W 4–0	4–0–0	Hodges Stadium (4,549); Jacksonville, FL
September 10*; 3:30 p.m., ACCN	No. 5	Florida; Rivalry	W 1–0	5–0–0	Seminole Soccer Complex (1,823); Tallahassee, FL
ACC Regular season
September 15; 4:00 p.m., ACCNX	No. 4	at No. 8 Clemson	W 4–2	6–0–0 (1–0–0)	Riggs Field (1,102); Clemson, SC
September 21; 7:00 p.m., ACCNX	No. 3	at Syracuse	W 3–2	7–0–0 (2–0–0)	SU Soccer Stadium (207); Syracuse, NY
September 24; 12:00 p.m., ESPNU	No. 3	at No. 1 North Carolina	T 3–3	7–0–1 (2–0–1)	Dorrance Field (4,079); Chapel Hill, NC
September 29; 7:00 p.m., ACCNX	No. 2	Miami (FL); Rivalry	W 2–0	8–0–1 (3–0–1)	Seminole Soccer Complex (1,978); Tallahassee, FL
October 5; 7:00 p.m., ACCNX	No. 2	at Louisville	W 2–0	9–0–1 (4–0–1)	Lynn Stadium (198); Louisville, KY
October 8; 1:00 p.m., ACCNX	No. 2	Boston College	W 6–0	10–0–1 (5–0–1)	Seminole Soccer Complex (1,444); Tallahassee, FL
October 12; 7:00 p.m., ACCN	No. 1	No. 11 Notre Dame	W 4–1	11–0–1 (6–0–1)	Seminole Soccer Complex (1,693); Tallahassee, FL
October 19; 7:00 p.m., ACCNX	No. 1	No. 18 Pittsburgh	W 3–2	12–0–1 (7–0–1)	Seminole Soccer Complex (1,125); Tallahassee, FL
October 22; 1:00 p.m., ACCNX	No. 1	at Duke	W 4–0	13–0–1 (8–0–1)	Koskinen Stadium (803); Durham, NC
October 26; 7:00 p.m., ACCNX	No. 1	NC State	W 5–0	14–0–1 (9–0–1)	Seminole Soccer Complex (1,189); Tallahassee, FL
ACC tournament
November 2; 8:20 p.m., ACCN	(1) No. 1	vs. (5) No. 11 Pittsburgh; Semifinal	W 2–0	15–0–1	WakeMed Soccer Park (678); Cary, NC
November 5; 12:00 p.m., ESPNU	(1) No. 1	vs. (3) No. 7 Clemson; Final	W 2–1	16–0–1	WakeMed Soccer Park; Cary, NC
NCAA tournament
November 10; 5:00 p.m., ESPN+	(1) No. 1	Morehead State; First Round	W 5–0	17–0–1	Seminole Soccer Complex (1,630); Tallahassee, FL
November 17; 5:30 p.m., ESPN+	(1) No. 1	(8) Texas A&M; Second Round	W 1–0	18–0–1	Seminole Soccer Complex (1,529); Tallahassee, FL
November 19; 5:30 p.m., ESPN+	(1) No. 1	(5) Texas; Third Round	W 5–0	19–0–1	Seminole Soccer Complex (1,391); Tallahassee, FL
November 24; 5:30 p.m., ESPN+	(1) No. 1	(7) No. 11 Pittsburgh; Quarterfinal	W 3–0	20–0–1	Seminole Soccer Complex (2,000); Tallahassee, FL
December 1; 6:00 p.m., ESPNU	(1) No. 1	vs. (1) No. 7 Clemson; Semifinal	W 2–0	21–0–1	WakeMed Soccer Park (10,635); Cary, NC
December 4; 6:00 p.m., ESPNU	(1) No. 1	vs. (2) No. 3 Stanford; Final	W 5–1	22–0–1	WakeMed Soccer Park (3,954); Cary, NC
*Non-conference game. ^{#}Rankings from United Soccer Coaches. (#) Tournament seedings in parentheses. All times are in Eastern.

== Awards and honors ==
Recipient	Award	Date	Ref.
Cristina Roque	Pre-season All-ACC Team	August 10	
Jody Brown	Pre-season All-ACC Team	August 10	
Taylor Huff	Hermann Trophy Preseason Watchlist	August 17	
Cristina Roque	Hermann Trophy Preseason Watchlist	August 17	
Jody Brown	Hermann Trophy Preseason Watchlist	August 17	
Taylor Huff	ACC Offensive Player of the Week	August 21	
Ran Iwai	ACC Defensive Player of the Week	October 10	
Onyi Echegini	ACC Offensive Player of the Week	October 17	
Onyi Echegini	College Soccer News National Player of the Week	October 23	
Onyi Echegini	ACC Co-Offensive Player of the Week	October 24	
Lauren Flynn	ACC Defensive Player of the Week	October 31	
Onyi Echegini	ACC Offensive Player of the Year	November 1	
Brian Pensky	ACC Coach of the Year	November 1	
Jordynn Dudley	ACC Freshman of the Year	November 1	
Jody Brown	All-ACC First Team	November 1	
Jordynn Dudley	All-ACC First Team	November 1	
Onyi Echegini	All-ACC First Team	November 1	
Taylor Huff	All-ACC Second Team	November 1	
Leilanni Nesbeth	All-ACC Second Team	November 1	
Cristina Roque	All-ACC Second Team	November 1	
Beata Olsson	All-ACC Third Team	November 1	
Jordynn Dudley	All-ACC Freshman Team	November 1	
Mimi Van Zanten	All-ACC Freshman Team	November 1	
Onyi Echegini	ACC Tournament MVP	November 5	
Onyi Echegini	All-ACC Tournament Team	November 5	
Cristina Roque	All-ACC Tournament Team	November 5	
Beata Olsson	All-ACC Tournament Team	November 5	
Jordynn Dudley	All-ACC Tournament Team	November 5	
Mimi Van Zanten	All-ACC Tournament Team	November 5	
Onyi Echegini	United Soccer Coaches All-Region First Team	November 28	
Jody Brown	United Soccer Coaches All-Region First Team	November 28	
Jordynn Dudley	United Soccer Coaches All-Region First Team	November 28	
Taylor Huff	United Soccer Coaches All-Region First Team	November 28	
Cristina Roque	United Soccer Coaches All-Region Second Team	November 28	
Onyi Echegini	Hermann Trophy winner	January 5	
Jordynn Dudley	Hermann Trophy winner	January 5	
Onyi Echegini	United Soccer Coaches All-America First Team	December 1	
Jordynn Dudley	United Soccer Coaches All-America First Team	December 1	
Taylor Huff	United Soccer Coaches All-America Second Team	December 1	
Jody Brown	United Soccer Coaches All-America Second Team	December 1	
Cristina Roque	United Soccer Coaches All-America Third Team	December 1	
Jordynn Dudley	College Cup Offensive MVP	December 4	
Lauren Flynn	College Cup Defensive MVP	December 4	
Jordynn Dudley	College Cup All-Tournament Team	December 4	
Lauren Flynn	College Cup All-Tournament Team	December 4	
Jody Brown	College Cup All-Tournament Team	December 4	
Taylor Huff	College Cup All-Tournament Team	December 4	
Leilanni Nesbeth	College Cup All-Tournament Team	December 4	
Onyi Echegini	Honda Sports Award winner	December 21	
Brian Pensky, Bobby Shuttleworth, Aaron Brunner, Andrew Hudson	United Soccer Coaches Coaching Staff of the Year	December 15	
Jordynn Dudley	Top Drawer Soccer Freshman of the Year	December 18	
Brian Pensky	Top Drawer Soccer Coach of the Year	December 18	
Jordynn Dudley	Top Drawer Soccer First Team Selection	December 18	
Lauren Flynn	Top Drawer Soccer First Team Selection	December 18	
Onyi Echegini	Top Drawer Soccer First Team Selection	December 18	
Taylor Huff	Top Drawer Soccer Second Team Selection	December 18	
Cristina Roque	Top Drawer Soccer Third Team Selection	December 18	

== Rankings ==
Ranking movements Legend: ██ Increase in ranking ██ Decrease in ranking ( ) = First-place votes
	Week																
Poll	Pre	1	2	3	4	5	6	7	8	9	10	11	12	13	14	15	Final
United Soccer	6	2	2	5	4	3 (1)	2	2	1 (8)	1 (7)	1 (8)	1 (8)	Not released				1 (8)
TopDrawer Soccer	3	2	2	1	1	1	1	1	1	1	1	1	1	1	1	1	1

== NWSL Draft ==
Player	Team	Round	Pick #	Position
Leilanni Nesbeth	Chicago Red Stars	1	10	Midfielder
Lauren Flynn	Utah Royals	2	16	Midfielder
Cristina Roque	Utah Royals	3	33	Goalkeeper
