= Claire Rain =

American soccer player (born 2002)

- Rain in 2026

Personal information
- Full name: Claire Elizabeth Rain
- Date of birth: June 20, 2002 (age 24)
- Place of birth: Dayton, Ohio, U.S.
- Height: 5 ft 9 in (1.75 m)
- Position: Center back

Team information
- Current team: Florida State Seminoles
- Number: 22

Youth career
- Tampa Bay United

College career
Years	Team	Apps	(Gls)
2021–2022	Tennessee Volunteers	42	(2)
2023–	Florida State Seminoles	10	(0)

Senior career*
Years	Team	Apps	(Gls)
2022	Tampa Bay United	5	(1)
2026	San Juan SC	6	(1)
- * Club domestic league appearances and goals

Claire Elizabeth Rain (born June 20, 2002) is an American college soccer player who plays as a center back for the Florida State Seminoles. She previously played for the Tennessee Volunteers.

== Early life ==
Rain was born in Dayton, Ohio, the daughter of Bill and Maureen Rain. She grew up in Tampa, Florida, where she played soccer and ran track in the 100 and 400 meters at H.B. Plant High School. She played ECNL club soccer for Tampa Bay United. She initially committed to play college soccer for the Ohio State Buckeyes (her family were fans) during her freshman year, but she later changed her commitment to the Tennessee Volunteers.

== College career ==
Rain with Tennessee in 2021

Rain enrolled early in the University of Tennessee in the spring of 2021. She played in all 23 games, starting 22, and scored 2 goals as a freshman, earning Southeastern Conference (SEC) all-freshman honors. She helped the Volunteers win their first SEC tournament since 2008 and earn their first NCAA tournament berth since 2018, reaching the third round. She was ranked 32nd in TopDrawerSoccer's top 100 freshman list. She started all 19 games as a sophomore in 2022, helping Tennessee win the SEC East title for the second consecutive year.

Rain transferred to play for the Florida State Seminoles alongside teammate Taylor Huff before her junior year in 2023, reuniting with former Tennessee head coach Brian Pensky. In her Seminoles debut, she sustained major injuries to her left knee tearing her anterior cruciate ligament (ACL), medial collateral ligament (MCL), lateral and medial meniscus, and patellar tendon. She was initially expected to be out a year with only an ACL tear, but she ended up missing nearly three seasons due to the injuries. At the end of 2025, she returned to make 2 appearances during the NCAA tournament as the Seminoles won their second national title in three years.

== Honors and awards ==
Tennessee Volunteers

- Southeastern Conference tournament: 2021

Florida State Seminoles

- NCAA Division I tournament: 2023, 2025
- Atlantic Coast Conference tournament: 2023, 2024

Individual

- SEC all-freshman team: 2021
