= 2023 NCAA Division I women's soccer tournament =

2023 NCAA women's soccer tournament
Women's College Cup (Semifinals & Final)

Tournament details
- Country: United States
- Dates: November 10 – December 4, 2023
- Teams: 64

Final positions
- Champions: (1) Florida State (4th title)
- Runners-up: (2) Stanford
- Semifinalists: (1) BYU; (1) Clemson

Tournament statistics
- Matches played: 63
- Goals scored: 184 (2.92 per match)
- Attendance: 108,876 (1,728 per match)
- Top goal scorer(s): (United States) Payton Linnehan, Penn State (5 goals)

Awards
- Most Valuable Player: Jordynn Dudley (Offensive); Lauren Flynn (Defensive)
- All statistics correct as of 12/5/2023.

The 2023 NCAA Division I women's soccer tournament was the 42nd edition of the NCAA Division I Women's Soccer Tournament, a postseason tournament to determine the national champion of NCAA Division I women's college soccer. The College Cup was played on December 1 and December 4 at WakeMed Soccer Park in Cary, North Carolina and televised on ESPNU.

UCLA were the defending National Champion. The Bruins were unable to defend their title as they were defeated in the first round of 2023 tournament by UC Irvine 1–0.

Florida State faced off against Stanford in the final. Florida State prevailed 5–1 and won their fourth overall title, all of which have come since 2014. Stanford's 36 game streak of allowing one or fewer goals was snapped and this was the first match where the Cardinal allowed five or more goals in a game since 1996. This was the first national championship match between two undefeated teams and Florida State became the first undefeated champion since Stanford in 2011.

== Qualification ==
All Division I women's soccer programs are eligible to qualify for the tournament. 29 teams received automatic bids by winning their conference tournaments, 2 teams received automatic bids by claiming the conference regular season crown (Pac-12 Conference and West Coast Conference don't hold conference tournaments), and an additional 33 teams earned at-large bids based on their regular season records.

Automatic bids
Conference	Team	Date qualified	Record	Appearance	Last Bid
ACC	Florida State	November 5	16–0–1	24th	2022
America East	Maine	November 5	11–1–6	1st	None
American	Memphis	November 5	18–1–0	12th	2022
ASUN	Florida Gulf Coast	November 5	12–4–5	8th	2022
Atlantic 10	Saint Louis	November 5	17–2–2	8th	2022
Big 12	Texas	November 4	15–4–2	17th	2022
Big East	Georgetown	November 5	13–3–2	14th	2022
Big Sky	Idaho	November 5	12–4–2	1st	None
Big South	Radford	November 5	12–5–2	10th	2022
Big Ten	Iowa	November 5	12–4–4	4th	2020
Big West	UC Irvine	November 5	8–7–6	5th	2022
CAA	Towson	November 5	15–2–2	1st	None
C-USA	Liberty	November 5	16–2–1	8th	2020
Horizon	Milwaukee	November 4	12–2–5	17th	2022
Ivy	Harvard	November 5	12–3–2	19th	2022
MAAC	Quinnipiac	November 5	13–3–1	3rd	2022
MAC	Ohio	November 5	9–7–5	1st	None
Missouri Valley	Valparaiso	November 5	11–5–6	3rd	2014
Mountain West	Utah State	November 4	14–7–1	3rd	2012
Northeast	Central Connecticut	November 5	10–4–5	12th	2021
Ohio Valley	Morehead State	November 5	9–5–5	4th	2013
Pac-12	UCLA	October 29	16–1–1	27th	2022
Patriot	Bucknell	November 5	12–3–5	7th	2022
SEC	Georgia	November 5	11–4–5	11th	2022
SoCon	Western Carolina	November 5	13–4–3	3rd	2008
Southland	Lamar	November 5	15–2–3	4th	2022
Summit League	South Dakota State	November 4	13–3–3	7th	2021
Sun Belt	Old Dominion	November 5	13–2–5	4th	2022
SWAC	Grambling State	November 5	15–4–4	2nd	2006
West Coast	Gonzaga	November 4	13–3–2	2nd	2005
WAC	Grand Canyon	November 4	14–4–4	2nd	2021

At-Large Bids
Conference	Team	Record	Appearance	Last Bid
ACC	Clemson	15–3–3	24th	2022
ACC	North Carolina	10–1–8	42nd	2022
ACC	Notre Dame	11–3–4	29th	2022
ACC	Pittsburgh	14–5–1	2nd	2022
Big 12	BYU	16–2–3	24th	2022
Big 12	Texas Tech	15–1–4	8th	2019
Big East	Providence	10–4–5	3rd	2021
Big East	Xavier	14–3–4	6th	2022
Big Ten	Indiana	12–3–4	5th	2013
Big Ten	Michigan	7–6–4	16th	2021
Big Ten	Michigan State	12–4–3	6th	2022
Big Ten	Nebraska	14–3–3	13th	2016
Big Ten	Ohio State	9–7–2	17th	2022
Big Ten	Penn State	13–2–4	29th	2022
Big Ten	Rutgers	9–6–4	18th	2022
Big Ten	Wisconsin	13–4–4	24th	2021
Ivy	Brown	11–2–2	10th	2022
Ivy	Columbia	10–4–3	2nd	2006
Ivy	Princeton	9–5–3	15th	2021
Pac-12	Arizona State	10–6–4	10th	2022
Pac-12	Colorado	13–4–3	13th	2020
Pac-12	Stanford	15–0–4	32nd	2022
Pac-12	USC	10–4–3	22nd	2022
SEC	Alabama	11–4–5	6th	2022
SEC	Arkansas	14–4–2	10th	2022
SEC	LSU	8–7–4	9th	2022
SEC	Mississippi State	10–5–5	3rd	2022
SEC	South Carolina	11–2–6	17th	2022
SEC	Tennessee	8–6–4	15th	2022
SEC	Texas A&M	9–7–4	28th	2022
Sun Belt	James Madison	9–4–8	12th	2015
West Coast	Pepperdine	9–4–5	13th	2021
West Coast	Santa Clara	13–4–2	33rd	2022

== Bracket ==
The bracket was announced on Monday, November 6, 2023. First round games are played on November 10, 11, and 12 at the campus site of the seeded team.

=== Florida State Bracket ===
First round Campus Sites
1	Florida State*	5
Morehead State	0
Colorado	0
8	Texas A&M*	1
5	Texas	2
Lamar	0
Milwaukee	0
4	Wisconsin*	2
3	Notre Dame*	2
Valparaiso	0
LSU	1
6	Memphis*	2
7	Pittsburgh*	6
Ohio State	0
Grambling State	0
2	Arkansas*	5

Second round Regional Campus Sites
1	Florida State*	1
8	Texas A&M	0
5	Texas	2
4	Wisconsin	1
3	Notre Dame	2
6	Memphis	3
7	Pittsburgh	4
2	Arkansas*	3

Round of 16; Regional Campus Sites
1	Florida State	5
5	Texas	0
6	Memphis	0
7	Pittsburgh	3

Quarterfinal; Campus Sites
1	Florida State	3
7	Pittsburgh	0

* Host institution

==== Schedule ====
===== First round =====
November 10	#1 Florida State	5–0	Morehead State	Tallahassee, FL
5:00 p.m. EST	Olivia Garcia 35'; Peyton Nourse 39'; Lauren Flynn 52'; Jody Brown 76'; Beata Olsson 88'	Report	(yellow card) 43' Gracen Houck	Stadium: Seminole Soccer Complex; Attendance: 1,630; Referee: Arnel Selman; Assistant referees: Joshua Belk; Jonathan Smith; Fourth official: Mario Maric

November 10	Texas	2–0	Lamar	Austin, TX
6:00 p.m. CST	Lexi Missimo 21' (pen.); Trinity Byars 42'	Report	(yellow card) 84' Team; (yellow card) 88' Caragan Childs	Stadium: Mike A. Myers Stadium; Attendance: 1,203; Referee: Arturo Ibarra; Assistant referees: Jennifer Dumaine; Javier Sebastian; Fourth official: George Kubove

November 10	#10 Arkansas	5–0	Grambling State	Fayetteville, AR
6:30 p.m. CST	Bella Field 51', 60', 70'; Ava Tankersley 52'; Team (yellow card) 62'; Sophia Aragon 84'	Report		Stadium: Razorback Field; Attendance: 1,846; Referee: Andrew Ellsworth; Assistant referees: Shane Cowger; Jose Lara; Fourth official: Dan Ortega

November 10	Texas A&M	1–0	Colorado	College Station, TX
7:00 p.m. CST	Mia Pante 22'; Margo Matula (yellow card) 22'; Maile Hayes (yellow card) 66'	Report	(yellow card) 35' Shyra James	Stadium: Ellis Field; Attendance: 1,569; Referee: William Hale; Assistant referees: Santiago Roa; Janae Thompson; Fourth official: Melvin Rivas

November 10	#12 Wisconsin	2–0	Milwaukee	Madison, WI
7:00 p.m. CST	Ashley Martinez (yellow card) 53'; Emma Jaskaniec 60'; Maddie Ishaug 67'	Report	(yellow card) 87' Lola Wojick	Stadium: McClimon Soccer Complex; Attendance: 1,183

November 11	#9 Notre Dame	2–0	Valparaiso	Notre Dame, IN
6:00 p.m. EST	Ellie Ospeck 49'; Charlie Codd 83'	Report	(yellow card) 33' Allie Anderson; (yellow card) 58' Addy Joiner	Stadium: Alumni Stadium; Attendance: 840; Referee: Alex Beehler; Assistant referees: Audra Fullen; Shane Richards; Fourth official: Michael Koziara

November 11	#11 Pittsburgh	6–0	Ohio State	Pittsburgh, PA
7:00 p.m. EST	Deborah Abiodun 29'; Sarah Schupansky 30'; Landy Mertz 35'; Samiah Phiri 47' (pen.); Amanda West 63'; Ellie Coffield 64'	Report		Stadium: Petersen Sports Complex; Attendance: 1,309; Referee: Marie Durr; Assistant referees: Sharon Gingrich; Lauren Lutikof; Fourth official: Benjamin Heflick

November 11	#8 Memphis	2–1	LSU	Memphis, TN
7:00 p.m. CST	Mya Jones 3'; Momo Nakao 3'	Report	70' Ava Galligan; (yellow card) 76' Delaney Tellex	Stadium: Mike Rose Soccer Complex; Attendance: 2,073; Referee: Nicole Green; Assistant referees: Laura Chambers; Sarah Gaddes; Fourth official: Tim Stewart

===== Second round =====
November 17	#12 Wisconsin	1–2	Texas	Tallahassee, FL
2:00 p.m. EST	Ashley Martinez (yellow card) 7'; Riley Philbin 39'	Report	(yellow card) 40' Carly Montgomery; 52' Ashlyn Miller; 68' Lexi Missimo	Stadium: Seminole Soccer Complex; Attendance: 100; Referee: Richonne Clark; Assistant referees: Albert Escover; Miriama Kocisova; Fourth official: Chris Chen

November 17	#9 Notre Dame	2–3	#8 Memphis	Fayetteville, AR
3:00 p.m. CST	Meg Mrowicki 44'; Eva Gaetino (yellow card) 76'; Morgan Roy (yellow card) 76'; Maddie Mercado 79'	Report	16' Finley Lavin; (yellow card) 52' Anne-Valerie Seto; 76' Saorla Miller; 77' Ashley Henderson	Stadium: Razorback Field; Attendance: 227; Referee: Shane Butler; Assistant referees: Laura Chambers-Waliski; Albert Kyei-Mensah; Fourth official: Brook Weiss

November 17	#1 Florida State	1–0	Texas A&M	Tallahassee, FL
5:30 p.m.EST	Jordynn Dudley 55', (yellow card) 87'	Report		Stadium: Seminole Soccer Complex; Attendance: 1,529; Referee: Alyssa Nichols; Assistant referees: Katarzyna Wasiak; Sebastian Ocampo; Fourth official: Chris Chen

November 17	#10 Arkansas	3–4	#11 Pittsburgh	Fayetteville, AR
6:30 p.m. CST	Bella Field 20'; Ainsley Erzen 36'; Bea Franklin 69'; Emilee Hauser (yellow card) 77'	Report	18' Amanda West; (yellow card) 33' Sarah Schupansky; 43' Keera Melenhorst; (yellow card) 63' Deborah Abiodun; (yellow card) 76' Team; 77', 89' Ellie Coffield	Stadium: Razorback Field; Attendance: 2,215; Referee: Travis Haight; Assistant referees: Tim Wagner; Drew Klemp; Fourth official: Brook Weiss

===== Round of 16 =====
November 19	#1 Florida State	5–0	Texas	Tallahassee, FL
5:30 p.m. EST	Beata Olsson 6'; Onyi Echegini 10'; Jordynn Dudley 21' (pen.); Taylor Huff 50'; Olivia Garcia 64'	Report	(yellow card) 38' Lauren Lapomarda	Stadium: Seminole Soccer Complex; Attendance: 1,391; Referee: Amin Hadzic; Assistant referees: Jarred Mosher; Mersid Turjacarin; Fourth official: Deny Kulasinac

November 19	#8 Memphis	0–3	#11 Pittsburgh	Fayetteville, AR
6:00 p.m. CST	Haylee Spray (yellow card) 33'	Report	52' Keera Melenhorst; 76' Deborah Abiodun; 88' Alyia Gomes	Stadium: Razorback Field; Attendance: 719; Referee: Brandon Gardner; Assistant referees: Seth Barton; Jay Norris; Fourth official: Bryan Lemus

===== Quarterfinals =====
November 24	#1 Florida State	3–0	#11 Pittsburgh	Tallahassee, FL
5:30 p.m. EST	Taylor Huff 63' (pen.); Leah Pais 69' (pen.); Onyi Echegini 70'; Beata Olsson (yellow card) 79'	Report	(yellow card) 56' Samiah Phiri; (yellow card) 63' Ashton Gordon	Stadium: Seminole Soccer Complex; Attendance: 2,000; Referee: Elvis Osmanovic; Assistant referees: Albert Escovar; Mario Maric; Fourth official: Arnel Selman

Rankings from United Soccer Coaches Final Regular Season Rankings

=== Clemson Bracket ===
First round Campus Sites
2	Penn State*	7
Central Connecticut	0
Arizona State	0
7	Santa Clara*	3
6	Saint Louis*	2
Indiana	0
Old Dominion	1
3	Georgetown* (a.e.t.)	2
4	Georgia*	2
Liberty	1
Bucknell	0
5	Iowa* (a.e.t.)	2
8	Columbia*	2
Rutgers	1
Radford	0
1	Clemson*	2

Second round Regional Campus Sites
2	Penn State*	2
7	Santa Clara	0
6	Saint Louis	2
3	Georgetown	1
4	Georgia	3
5	Iowa	2
8	Columbia	1
1	Clemson*	2

Round of 16; Regional Campus Sites
2	Penn State (a.e.t.)	4
6	Saint Louis	3
4	Georgia	1 (3)
1	Clemson (pen.)	1 (5)

Quarterfinal; Campus Sites
2	Penn State	1
1	Clemson	2

* Host institution

==== Schedule ====
===== First round =====
November 10	Georgia	2–1	Liberty	Athens, GA
4:00 p.m. EST	Hannah White 24'; Kiera Staude 85'	Report	72' Ivy Garner	Stadium: Turner Soccer Complex; Attendance: 1,483; Referee: Kayla Polonsky; Assistant referees: Jarred Mosher; Thomas Brigman; Fourth official: Jason Kent

November 10	#5 Penn State	7–0	Central Connecticut	University Park, PA
6:00 p.m. EST	Payton Linnehan 6', 9', 26'; Mieke Schiemann 32'; Cori Dyke 36' (pen.); Julia Raich 49'; Rebecca Cooke 53'	Report		Stadium: Jeffrey Field; Attendance: 889; Referee: Alla Stepanov; Assistant referees: Taylor Bombalski; Elena Dauphinais; Fourth official: Magda Zwierzchowski

November 10	#7 Clemson	2–0	Radford	Clemson, SC
7:00 p.m. EST	Makenna Morris 56'; Caroline Conti 77'	Report	(yellow card) 35' Alexeis Kirnos	Stadium: Riggs Field; Attendance: 1,775; Referee: Jude Carr; Assistant referees: Raymond Thomas; Marcus Moss; Fourth official: John Rush

November 10	Iowa	2–0 (a.e.t.)	Bucknell	Iowa City, IA
6:00 p.m. CST	Josie Durr 95'; Kelli McGroarty 109'	Report	(yellow card) 78' Meghan White	Stadium: Grant Field; Attendance: 2,639; Referee: Esad Omanovic; Assistant referees: Jared Kuehl; Aaron Valley; Fourth official: Jacob Larson

November 10	#21 Saint Louis	2–0	Indiana	St. Louis, MO
7:00 p.m. CST	Abbie Miller 11' (pen.); Anna Lawler 30'	Report	(yellow card) 81' Team; (yellow card) 82' Camille Hamm	Stadium: Hermann Stadium; Attendance: 2,789; Referee: Velimir Stefanovic; Assistant referees: Kyle Armstrong; Joseph Macht; Fourth official: Tim Wagner

November 11	Georgetown	2–1 (a.e.t.)	Old Dominion	Washington, D.C.
12:00 p.m. EST	Brianne Riley 73'; Kaya Hanson (yellow card) 80'; Julia Leas (yellow card) 98'; Natalie Means 100'; Claire Manning (yellow card) 106'	Report	40' Ashlynn Kulha; (yellow card) 89' Thalia Morisi; (yellow card) 110' Ece Turkoglu	Stadium: Shaw Field; Attendance: 817; Referee: Scarlet Agrawal; Assistant referees: Albert Calise; Paxton Sutphin; Fourth official: Inga Maric

November 11	#23 Santa Clara	3–0	Arizona State	Santa Clara, CA
1:00 p.m. PST	Sally Menti 7'; Alyssa Bourgeois 36'; Annie Karich 39'; Colby Barnett (yellow card) 47'; Farrah Walters (yellow card) 70'	Report	(yellow card) 80' Gabi Rennie; (yellow card) 88' Enasia Colon	Stadium: Stevens Stadium; Attendance: 1,042; Referee: Michael Zapata; Assistant referees: Robert Vincze; Roxana Guillen; Fourth official: Jonathan Simon

November 12	Columbia	2–1	Rutgers	New York, NY
12:00 p.m. EST	Kat Jordan 79'; Shira Cohen 89'	Report	66' Ashley Baran; (yellow card) 88' Sam Gordon	Stadium: Commisso Soccer Stadium; Attendance: 1,213; Referee: Brian Dunn; Assistant referees: Alexandru Focea; Julia Connor; Fourth official: Tyler McElhinney

===== Second round =====
November 17	Georgia	3–2	Iowa	Clemson, SC
2:00 p.m. EST	Nicole Vernis 60'; Summer Denigan (yellow card) 63', (goal) 85'; Taylor Rish 66'	Report	63' Millie Greer; 89' Kelli McGroarty	Stadium: Riggs Field; Referee: Benjamin Oakley; Assistant referees: Rick Rogers; Shevah Rezaee; Fourth official: Eric Barnes

November 17	Georgetown	1–2	#21 Saint Louis	University Park, PA
3:00 p.m. EST	Julia Leas 89'	Report	46' Hannah Larson; 61' Hannah Sawyer	Stadium: Jeffrey Field; Attendance: 189; Referee: Meghan Mullen; Assistant referees: A. Max Smith; Taylor Bombalski; Fourth official: Ashley Smyda

November 17	#7 Clemson	2–1	Columbia	Clemson, SC
5:30 p.m. EST	Megan Bornkamp 29'; Renee Lyles 33'	Report	62' Nata Ramirez	Stadium: Riggs Field; Attendance: 2,521; Referee: Amin Hadzic; Assistant referees: Zachary McWhorter; Jarred Mosher; Fourth official: Josiah Parke

November 17	#5 Penn State	2–0	#23 Santa Clara	University Park, PA
6:00 p.m. EST	Kaitlyn MacBean 4'; Payton Linnehan 21'	Report		Stadium: Jeffrey Field; Attendance: 687; Referee: Ashely Cedro; Assistant referees: Mathew Richardson; Ankur Singh; Fourth official: Maria Gigante

===== Round of 16 =====
November 19	#5 Penn State	4–3 (a.e.t.)	#21 Saint Louis	University Park, PA
1:00 p.m. EST	Kaitlyn MacBean 22', 23'; Team (yellow card) 80'; Mieke Schiemann 87'; Ellie Wheeler (yellow card) 88'; Payton Linnehan 98'	Report	31', 71' Hannah Larson; 64' Emily Gaebe; (yellow card) 87' Caroline Kelly	Stadium: Jeffrey Field; Attendance: 822; Referee: Danielle Chesky; Assistant referees: Sharon Gingrich; Jeffrey Skinker; Fourth official: Luis Diego Arroyo

November 19	#7 Clemson	1–1 (a.e.t.) (5–3 p)	Georgia	Clemson, SC
EST	Megan Bornkamp 88'	Report	84' Croix Bethune	Stadium: Riggs Field; Attendance: 1,471; Referee: Brandon Marion; Assistant referees: Robert Dail; Erich Usher; Fourth official: William Steffen
	Penalties
	Caroline Conti (penalty scored); Makenna Morris (penalty scored); Harper White (penalty scored); Renee Lyles (penalty scored); Samantha Meredith (penalty scored)		(penalty scored) Nicole Vernis; (penalty scored) Summer Denigan; (penalty scored) Cate Hardin; (penalty missed) Croix Bethune

===== Quarterfinals =====
November 25	#5 Penn State	1–2	#7 Clemson	Clemson, SC
1:00 p.m. EST	Kaitlyn MacBean 73'; Team (yellow card) 75'; Payton Linnehan (yellow card) 78'	Report	70' Makenna Morris; (yellow card) 75' Dani Davis; 84' Caroline Conti	Stadium: Riggs Field; Attendance: 1,472; Referee: Nicole Green; Assistant referees: Justin Howard; Brian Marshall; Fourth official: Khadime Sabara

Rankings from United Soccer Coaches Final Regular Season Rankings

=== BYU Bracket ===
First round Campus Sites
1	BYU*	2
Utah State	0
Grand Canyon	0
8	USC*	1
5	Michigan State*	3
Ohio	0
Maine	0
4	Harvard*	3
3	North Carolina*	3
Towson	1
Western Carolina	0
6	Alabama*	2
7	Princeton*	1
Michigan	0
Florida Gulf Coast	0
2	Texas Tech*	1

Second round Regional Campus Sites
1	BYU*	1
8	USC	0
5	Michigan State	1
4	Harvard	0
3	North Carolina	1
6	Alabama	0
7	Princeton	0 (3)
2	Texas Tech* (pen.)	0 (4)

Round of 16; Regional Campus Sites
1	BYU	3
5	Michigan State	1
3	North Carolina	1
2	Texas Tech	0

Quarterfinal; Campus Sites
1	BYU	4
3	North Carolina	3

* Host institution

==== Schedule ====
===== First round =====
November 10	#22 USC	1–0	Grand Canyon	Los Angeles, CA
2:00 p.m. PST	Maribel Flores (yellow card) 44'; Team (yellow card) 80'; Helena Sampaio 66' (pen.), (yellow card) 85'; Hannah Dickinson (yellow card) 85'	Report		Stadium: McAlister Field; Attendance: 527; Referee: William Hoffman; Assistant referees: Kristin Patterson; Abdel Hakeem Wakil; Fourth official: Trevor Wiseman

November 10	#24 Alabama	2–0	Western Carolina	Tuscaloosa, AL
5:00 p.m. CST	Macy Clem 11'; Itala Gemelli 82'	Report	(yellow card) 69' Kirsten Hahn	Stadium: Alabama Soccer Stadium; Attendance: 561; Referee: Matthew Thompson; Assistant referees: Sam Bilbo; Celeste Roberts; Fourth official: Logan Reeves

November 10	#20 Michigan State	3–0	Ohio	East Lansing, MI
6:00 p.m. EST	Bella Najera 3' (pen.), 77'; Justina Gaynor 26'; Maggie Illig (yellow card) 80'	Report	(yellow card) 46' Ella Bianco; (yellow card) 65' Shae Robertson	Stadium: DeMartin Soccer Complex; Attendance: 1,612; Referee: Cesar Ibarra; Assistant referees: Fernando Pina; Marcus Barnett; Fourth official: Jason Cross

November 10	#13 North Carolina	3–1	Towson	Chapel Hill, NC
6:00 p.m. EST	Team (yellow card) 9'; Bella Sember 44'; Ally Sentnor 60'; Avery Patterson 84'	Report	25' Jasmine Hamid; (yellow card) 45' Phoebe Canoles	Stadium: Dorrance Field; Attendance: 1,889; Referee: JC Griggs; Assistant referees: Jeremy Smith; Robert Betts; Fourth official: Thomas Rutherford

November 10	Princeton	1–0	Michigan	Princeton, NJ
7:00 p.m. EST	Lexi Hiltunen 80'; Aria Nagai (yellow card) 86'	Report	(yellow card) 86' Tamia Tolbert; (yellow card) 89' Sammi Woods	Stadium: Roberts Stadium; Attendance: 1,150; Referee: Danielle Chesky; Assistant referees: Zachary Rubinich; Justin Saporito; Fourth official: Danielle Cornetta

November 10	#4 Texas Tech	1–0	Florida Gulf Coast	Lubbock, TX
6:00 p.m. CST	Jillian Martinez (yellow card) 74'; Alex Kerr 79'	Report	(yellow card) 3' Erika Zschuppe	Stadium: John Walker Soccer Complex; Attendance: 1,810; Referee: Brandon Gardner; Assistant referees: Hans Soland; Carlos de Dios; Fourth official: Leaford Calder Sr.

November 10	#6 BYU	2–0	Utah State	Provo, UT
6:00 p.m. MST	Kendell Petersen 10'; Olivia Katoa 73'	Report		Stadium: South Field; Attendance: 4,569; Referee: Nathan Boone; Assistant referees: Karsten Gillwald; Robert Kosinski; Fourth official: Michael Anglin

November 11	Harvard	3–0	Maine	Boston, MA
5:00 p.m. EST	Josefine Hasbo 8'; Hannah Bebar 24'; Anna Rayhill 41'	Report		Stadium: Jordan Field; Attendance: 1,587; Referee: Randall Kelley; Assistant referees: Tom Felice; Jill Canelli; Fourth official: Nico Vesia

===== Second round =====
November 16	Harvard	0–1	#20 Michigan State	Provo, UT
4:00 p.m. MST	Team (yellow card) 68'	Report	50' (pen.) Justina Gaynor; (yellow card) 82' Celia Gaynor; (yellow card) 87' Regan Dalton	Stadium: South Field; Attendance: 625; Referee: Nathan Boone; Assistant referees: Karsten Gillwald; Daniel Reading; Fourth official: Taylor Mott

November 16	#6 BYU	1–0	#22 USC	Provo, UT
7:00 p.m. MST	Izzi Stratton (yellow card) 54'; Bella Folino 58'	Report		Stadium: South Field; Attendance: 4,176; Referee: Jeff Arthurholtz; Assistant referees: Rachel Swett; Brad Church; Fourth official: Taylor Mott

November 17	#13 North Carolina	1–0	#24 Alabama	Lubbock, TX
2:30 p.m. CST	Ally Sentnor 19'	Report		Stadium: John Walker Soccer Complex; Referee: Daniel Radford; Assistant referees: Tony Obas; Aaron Donahue; Fourth official: Leadford Calder Sr.

November 17	#4 Texas Tech	0–0 (a.e.t.) (4–3 p)	Princeton	Lubbock, TX
6:00 p.m. CST		Report	(yellow card) 59' Pietra Tordin	Stadium: John Walker Soccer Complex; Attendance: 2,346; Referee: Michael Lavergne; Assistant referees: Joel McKell; Emily Gomez; Fourth official: Leaford Calder Sr.
	Penalties
	Sam Courtwright (penalty scored); Jillian Martinez (penalty scored); Alex Kerr (penalty scored); Ashleigh Williams (penalty missed); Peyton Parsons (penalty scored)		(penalty scored) Heather MacNab; (penalty scored) Kayla Wong; (penalty scored) Lily Bryant; (penalty missed) Zoe Markesini; (penalty missed) Aria Nagai

===== Round of 16 =====
November 18	#6 BYU	3–1	#20 Michigan State	Provo, UT
6:00 p.m. MST	Brecken Mozingo 55' (pen.), 60'; Ellie Walbruch 80'	Report	52' Gabby Mueller; (yellow card) 55' Celia Gaynor	Stadium: South Field; Attendance: 3,695; Referee: Megan McCain; Assistant referees: Michael Anglin; Cameron Siler; Fourth official: Brad Church

November 19	#4 Texas Tech	0–1	#13 North Carolina	Lubbock, TX
1:00 p.m. CST		Report	72' Bella Sember	Stadium: John Walker Soccer Complex; Attendance: 2,558; Referee: Lorenzo Hernandez; Assistant referees: Joshua Ell; Muhammed Kaleia; Fourth official: Habeeb Hooshmand

===== Quarterfinals =====
November 24	#6 BYU	4–3	#13 North Carolina	Provo, UT
6:00 p.m. MST	Laveni Vaka (yellow card) 19'; Bella Folino 61', 82'; Brecken Mozingo 81'; Olivia Katoa 89'	Report	2' Maycee Bell; 9', 20' Ally Sentnor	Stadium: South Field; Attendance: 3,487; Referee: Jaclyn Metz; Assistant referees: Karsten Gillwald; Rachel Swett; Fourth official: Nathan Boone

Rankings from United Soccer Coaches Final Regular Season Rankings

=== UCLA Bracket ===
First round Campus Sites
2	Stanford*	3
Pepperdine	0
James Madison	0
7	South Carolina*	2
6	Mississippi State* (a.e.t.)	1
Providence	0
Quinnipiac	0
3	Brown*	3
4	Xavier*	0
Tennessee (a.e.t.)	1
South Dakota State	2
5	Nebraska*	5
8	Gonzaga*	1
Idaho	0
UC Irvine	1
1	UCLA*	0

Second round Regional Campus Sites
2	Stanford*	3
7	South Carolina	0
6	Mississippi State	2
3	Brown	1
Tennessee	1
5	Nebraska*	2
8	Gonzaga	1
UC Irvine	2

Round of 16; Regional Campus Sites
2	Stanford*	1
6	Mississippi State	0
5	Nebraska*	4
UC Irvine	0

Quarterfinal; Campus Sites
2	Stanford (a.e.t.)	2
5	Nebraska	1

* Host institution

==== Schedule ====
===== First round =====
November 10	#16 South Carolina	2–0	James Madison	Columbia, SC
6:00 p.m. EST	Lily Render 25', 31'	Report	(yellow card) 74' Amanda Attanasi	Stadium: Stone Stadium; Attendance: 1,700; Referee: Alyssa Nichols; Assistant referees: Justin Howard; Zachary McWhorter; Fourth official: Benjamin Oakley

November 10	#15 Nebraska	5–2	South Dakota State	Lincoln, NE
7:05 p.m. CST	Sadie Waite 5', 34'; Gwen Lane (yellow card) 22'; Ella Rudney (yellow card) 36'; Sarah Weber 39', 48'; Eleanor Dale 58'	Report	2' Avery Murdzek; 24' Taryn Hettich	Stadium: Barbara Hibner Soccer Stadium; Attendance: 2,044; Referee: Edvin Jurisevic; Assistant referees: Emily Brownback; Zachary Richter; Fourth official: Nathan Jones

November 10	#3 Stanford	3–0	Pepperdine	Stanford, CA
6:00 p.m. PST	Jasmine Aikey 32'; Kennedy Wesley 52'; Andrea Kitahata 75'	Report		Stadium: Laird Q. Cagan Stadium; Attendance: 1,804; Referee: Peter Hanson; Assistant referees: Jamie Padilla; Cecilia Chavez; Fourth official: Francisco Franco

November 10	#2 UCLA	0–1	UC Irvine	Los Angeles, CA
6:00 p.m. PST	Lilly Reale (yellow card) 70'	Report	(yellow card) 71' (yellow-red card) 75' Chloe Ragon; 87' Alyssa Moore	Stadium: Wallis Annenberg Stadium; Attendance: 1,864; Referee: Ivan de Cristofaro; Assistant referees: Maria Magana; Marissa Postlethwaite; Fourth official: Nathan Max

November 11	#18 Mississippi State	1–0 (a.e.t.)	Providence	Starkville, MS
1:00 p.m. CST	Maggie Wadsworth 96'	Report	(yellow card) 65' Kyla Gallagher	Stadium: MSU Soccer Field; Attendance: 1,088; Referee: Melinda Sopak; Assistant referees: Donovan Eubank; Sam Bierster; Fourth official: Wes Caouette

November 11	#14 Brown	3–0	Quinnipiac	Providence, RI
4:00 p.m. EST	Ava Seelenfreund 15'; Layla Shell 31'; Sheyenne Allen (yellow card) 37'; Brittany Raphino 90'	Report	(yellow card) 31' Team; (yellow card) 38' Kayla Mingachos	Stadium: Stevenson-Pincince Field; Attendance: 1,066; Referee: Dianna Kolodziey; Assistant referees: Adam Cook; Shannon Malloy; Fourth official: Juan Montalvan

November 11	#17 Xavier	0–1 (a.e.t.)	Tennessee	Cincinnati, OH
4:00 p.m. EST	Olivia Lawson (yellow card) 90'; Ella Rogers (yellow card) 98'	Report	(yellow card) 80' Team; 102' Sizzy Lawton	Stadium: Corcoran Field; Attendance: 1,261; Referee: Austin Saini; Assistant referees: Erin Patterson; JJ Jemison; Fourth official: Kyle Maust

November 11	#19 Gonzaga	1–0	Idaho	Spokane, WA
5:00 p.m. PST	Marissa Garcia 16'	Report	(yellow card) 28' Maya Hamilton	Stadium: Luger Field; Attendance: 1,874; Referee: Jaclyn Metz; Assistant referees: Serghei Celan; Darya Fedchanka; Fourth official: Brian Lambrecht

===== Second round =====
November 17	#19 Gonzaga	1–2	UC Irvine	Lincoln, NE
3:30 p.m. CST	Katelyn Rigg 40'	Report	5' Laila El Behery; 17' Lilli Rask	Stadium: Barbara Hibner Soccer Stadium; Referee: Esad Omanovic; Assistant referees: Emily Brownback; Andrew Scheneman; Fourth official: Michael Barton

November 17	#14 Brown	1–2	#18 Mississippi State	Stanford, CA
3:30 p.m. PST	Naya Cardoza 61'	Report	(yellow card) 37', (goal) 70' Kennedy White; (yellow card) 71' Rylie Combs; 77' Taylor James	Stadium: Laird Q. Cagan Stadium; Attendance: 1,547; Referee: Jamie Padilla; Assistant referees: Troy Thiele; Angeles Pineda; Fourth official: Laurie Faulk

November 17	#15 Nebraska	2–1	Tennessee	Lincoln, NE
7:00 p.m. CST	Sarah Weber 45'; Ella Guyott 89'	Report	49' Macaira Midgley	Stadium: Barbara Hibner Soccer Stadium; Attendance: 2,318; Referee: Kyle Armstrong; Assistant referees: Joseph Macht; Christopher Civitate; Fourth official: Jacob Larson

November 17	#3 Stanford	3–0	#16 South Carolina	Stanford, CA
6:00 p.m. PST	18', 63' Andrea Kitahata; 66' Maya Doms	Report	(yellow card) 14' Corinna Zullo	Stadium: Laird Q. Cagan Stadium; Attendance: 1,991; Referee: Robert Vincze; Assistant referees: Cecilia Chaves; Oscar Guillen; Fourth official: Turan Ozdemir

===== Round of 16 =====
November 19	#15 Nebraska	4–0	UC Irvine	Lincoln, NE
1:00 p.m. CST	Abbey Schwarz 14', (yellow card) 62'; Eleanor Dale 30', 87'; Haley Peterson 41'	Report	(yellow card) 87' Gianna Creighton	Stadium: Barbara Hibner Soccer Stadium; Attendance: 1,717; Referee: Velimir Stefanovic; Assistant referees: Justin Mack; Nathan Colling; Fourth official: Anthony Sobolevsky

November 19	#3 Stanford	1–0	#18 Mississippi State	Stanford, CA
1:00 p.m. PST	Elise Evans 11'	Report	(yellow card) 39' Macey Hodge; (yellow card) 44' Rylie Combs	Stadium: Laird Q. Cagan Stadium; Attendance: 1,829; Referee: Peter Hanson; Assistant referees: Iryna Petrunok; Roxana Guillen; Fourth official: Troy Thiele

===== Quarterfinals =====
November 24	#15 Nebraska	1–2	#3 Stanford	Stanford, CA
2:00 p.m. PST	Sarah Weber 87'	Report	11' Nebraska Own Goal; (yellow card) 72' Allie Montoya; 95' Maya Doms	Stadium: Laird Q. Cagan Stadium; Attendance: 1,949; Referee: William Hoffman; Assistant referees: Jamie Padilla; Krystin Pahia; Fourth official: Alex Del Angel

Rankings from United Soccer Coaches Final Regular Season Rankings

=== College Cup ===
Semifinals; December 1 WakeMed Soccer Park; Cary, North Carolina
1	BYU	0
2	Stanford	2
1	Florida State	2
1	Clemson	0

Final; December 4 WakeMed Soccer Park; Cary, North Carolina
2	Stanford	1
1	Florida State	5

==== Schedule ====
===== Semifinals =====
December 1, 2023	#1 Florida State	2–0	#7 Clemson	Cary, NC
6:00 p.m. EST	Team (yellow card) 31'; Kaitlyn Zipay 38'; Jordynn Dudley 53'	Report	(yellow card) 30' Hal Hershfelt	Stadium: WakeMed Soccer Park; Referee: Nicholas Balcer; Assistant referees: Laura Chambers; Sharon Gingrich; Fourth official: Lauren Aldrich

December 1, 2023	#6 BYU	0–2	#3 Stanford	Cary, NC
8:30 p.m. EST	Ellie Walbruch (yellow card) 75'	Report	2' Allie Montoya; 4' Maya Doms	Stadium: WakeMed Soccer Park; Attendance: 10,635; Referee: Jonathan Weiner; Assistant referees: Sam Bilbo; Jessica Carnevale; Fourth official: Lauren Aldrich

===== Final =====
December 4, 2023	#3 Stanford	1–5	#1 Florida State	Cary, NC
6:00 p.m. EST	Maya Doms 52'; Shae Harvey (yellow card) 87'	Report	Jordynn Dudley 29' (pen.); Jody Brown 29', 61'; Beata Olsson 58'; Onyi Echegini 84'	Stadium: WakeMed Soccer Park; Attendance: 3,954; Referee: Meghan Mullen; Assistant referees: Katherine Mitchell; Maggie Short; Fourth official: William Steffen

Rankings from United Soccer Coaches Final Regular Season Rankings

== Record by conference ==
Conference	Bids	Record	Pct.	R32	R16	E8	F4	CG	NC
ACC	5	16–4–1	.786	5	4	4	2	1	1
Pac-12	5	5–5	.500	2	1	1	1	1	–
Big 12	3	7–3–1	.682	3	3	1	1	–	–
Big Ten	9	10–9	.526	5	3	2	–	–	–
SEC	8	9–7–1	.559	7	2	–	–	–	–
Atlantic 10	1	2–1	.667	1	1	–	–	–	–
Big West	1	2–1	.667	1	1	–	–	–	–
American	1	2–1	.667	1	1	–	–	–	–
Ivy	4	4–3–1	.563	4	–	–	–	–	–
WCC	3	2–3	.400	2	–	–	–	–	–
Big East	3	1–3	.250	1	–	–	–	–	–
Sun Belt	2	0–2	.000	–	–	–	–	–	–
Other	19	0–19	.000	–	–	–	–	–	–

- The R32, S16, E8, F4, CG, and NC columns indicate how many teams from each conference were in the Round of 32 (second round), Round of 16 (third round), Quarterfinals (Elite Eight), Semifinals (Final Four), Championship Game, and National Champion, respectively.
- With the exception of the national championship game, any game tied after the second overtime period is recorded as a tie. If the national championship game is decided in a penalty-kick tiebreaker, the winner of the tiebreaker is counted as having won the game.
- The following conferences received one bid and failed to place a team into the round of 32: America East, ASUN, Big Sky, Big South, CAA, Conference USA, Horizon, MAAC, MAC, Missouri Valley, Mountain West, Northeast, Ohio Valley, Patriot, SoCon, Southland, Summit League, SWAC, WAC. These conferences' records have been consolidated in the "Other" row.

== Statistics ==
=== Goalscorers ===
There were 184 goals scored in 63 matches, for an average of 2.92 goals per match.

5 goals

- (United States) Payton Linnehan – Penn State

4 goals

- (United States) Bella Field – Arkansas
- (United States) Jordynn Dudley – Florida State
- (United States) Sarah Weber – Nebraska
- (United States) Ally Sentnor – North Carolina
- (United States) Kaitlyn MacBean – Penn State
- (United States) Maya Doms – Stanford

3 goals

- (United States) Bella Folino – BYU
- (United States) Brecken Mozingo – BYU
- (Nigeria) Onyi Echegini – Florida State
- (Sweden) Beata Olsson – Florida State
- (England) Eleanor Dale – Nebraska
- (United States) Ellie Coffield – Pittsburgh
- (United States) Hannah Larson – Saint Louis
- (United States) Andrea Kitahata – Stanford

2 goals

- (United States) Olivia Katoa – BYU
- (United States) Megan Bornkamp – Clemson
- (United States) Caroline Conti – Clemson
- (United States) Makenna Morris – Clemson
- (Jamaica) Jody Brown – Florida State
- (United States) Olivia Garcia – Florida State
- (United States) Taylor Huff – Florida State
- (United States) Kelli McGroarty – Iowa
- (United States) Justina Gaynor – Michigan State
- (United States) Bella Najera – Michigan State
- (Canada) Sadie Waite – Nebraska
- (United States) Bella Sember – North Carolina
- (Germany) Mieke Schiemann – Penn State
- (Nigeria) Deborah Abiodun – Pittsburgh
- (Canada) Keera Melenhorst – Pittsburgh
- (Canada) Amanda West – Pittsburgh
- (United States) Lily Render – South Carolina
- (United States) Lexi Missimo – Texas

1 goal

- (United States) Macy Clem – Alabama
- (United States) Itala Gemelli – Alabama
- (United States) Sophia Aragon – Arkansas
- (United States) Ainsley Erzen – Arkansas
- (United States) Bea Franklin – Arkansas
- (United States) Ava Tankersley – Arkansas
- (Canada) Naya Cardoza – Brown
- (Haiti) Brittany Raphino – Brown
- (United States) Ava Seelenfreund – Brown
- (United States) Layla Shell – Brown
- (United States) Kendell Petersen – BYU
- (United States) Ellie Walbruch – BYU
- (United States) Renee Lyles – Clemson
- (United States) Shira Cohen – Columbia
- (United States) Kat Jordan – Columbia
- (United States) Nata Ramirez – Columbia
- (United States) Lauren Flynn – Florida State
- (United States) Peyton Nourse – Florida State
- (Canada) Leah Pais– Florida State
- (United States) Kaitlyn Zipay – Florida State
- (United States) Julia Leas – Georgetown
- (United States) Natalie Means – Georgetown
- (United States) Brianne Riley – Georgetown
- (United States) Summer Denigan – Georgia
- (United States) Croix Bethune – Georgia
- (United States) Taylor Rish – Georgia
- (United States) Kiera Staude – Georgia
- (United States) Nicole Vernis – Georgia
- (United States) Hannah White – Georgia
- (United States) Marissa Garcia – Gonzaga
- (United States) Katelyn Rigg – Gonzaga
- (United States) Hannah Bebar – Harvard
- (Denmark) Josefine Hasbo – Harvard
- (United States) Anna Rayhill – Harvard
- (United States) Josie Durr – Iowa
- (United States) Millie Greer – Iowa
- (Puerto Rico) Ivy Garner – Liberty
- (United States) Ava Galligan – LSU
- (United States) Ashley Henderson – Memphis
- (Canada) Mya Jones – Memphis
- (United States) Finley Lavin – Memphis
- (Canada) Saorla Miller – Memphis
- (Japan) Momo Nakao – Memphis
- (United States) Gabby Mueller – Michigan State
- (United States) Taylor James – Mississippi State
- (United States) Maggie Wadsworth – Mississippi State
- (United States) Kennedy White – Mississippi State
- (United States) Ella Guyott – Nebraska
- (United States) Haley Peterson – Nebraska
- (United States) Abbey Schwarz – Nebraska
- (United States) Maycee Bell – North Carolina
- (United States) Avery Patterson – North Carolina
- (United States) Charlie Codd – Notre Dame
- (United States) Maddie Mercado – Notre Dame
- (United States) Meg Mrowicki – Notre Dame
- (United States) Ellie Ospeck – Notre Dame
- (United States) Ashlynn Kulha – Old Dominion
- (Republic of Ireland) Rebecca Cooke – Penn State
- (United States) Cori Dyke – Penn State
- (United States) Julia Raich – Penn State
- (Canada) Aliya Gomes – Pittsburgh
- (United States) Landy Mertz – Pittsburgh
- (United States) Samiah Phiri – Pittsburgh
- (United States) Sarah Schupansky – Pittsburgh
- (United States) Lexi Hiltunen – Princeton
- (United States) Ashley Baran – Rutgers
- (United States) Emily Gaebe – Saint Louis
- (United States) Anna Lawler – Saint Louis
- (United States) Abbie Miller – Saint Louis
- (Canada) Hannah Sawyer – Saint Louis
- (United States) Alyssa Bourgeois – Santa Clara
- (United States) Annie Karich – Santa Clara
- (United States) Sally Menti – Santa Clara
- (United States) Taryn Hettich – South Dakota State
- (United States) Avery Murdzek – South Dakota State
- (United States) Jasmine Aikey – Stanford
- (United States) Elise Evans – Stanford
- (United States) Allie Montoya – Stanford
- (United States) Kennedy Wesley – Stanford
- (United States) Sizzy Lawton – Tennessee
- (United States) Macaira Midgley – Tennessee
- (United States) Trinity Byars – Texas
- (United States) Ashlyn Miller – Texas
- (Canada) Mia Pante – Texas A&M
- (United States) Alex Kerr – Texas Tech
- (United States) Jasmine Hamid – Towson
- (Egypt) Laila El Behery – UC Irvine
- (United States) Alyssa Moore – UC Irvine
- (United States) Lilli Rask – UC Irvine
- (Brazil) Helena Sampaio – USC
- (United States) Maddie Ishaug – Wisconsin
- (United States) Emma Jaskaniec – Wisconsin
- (United States) Riley Philbin – Wisconsin

1 own goal

- Nebraska (vs. Stanford)

== See also ==
- 2023 NCAA Division I men's soccer tournament
