= Landy Mertz =

American soccer player (born 2000)

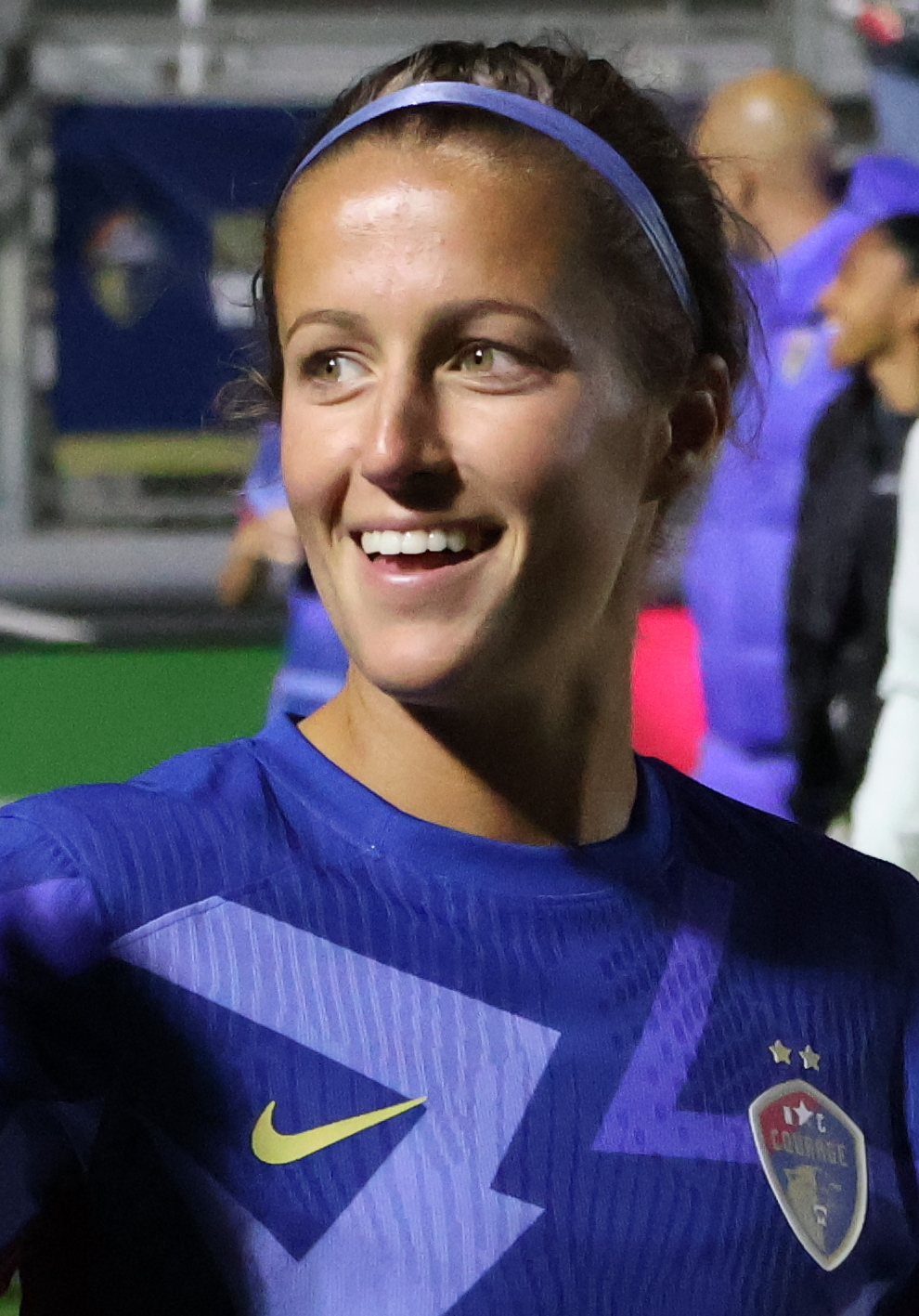
- Mertz with the North Carolina Courage in 2024

Personal information
- Full name: Lauren Landy Mertz
- Date of birth: July 19, 2000 (age 26)
- Height: 5 ft 4 in (1.63 m)
- Position: Midfielder

College career
| Years | Team | Apps | (Gls) |
| 2019 | Dayton Flyers | 19 | (3) |
| 2020–2023 | Pittsburgh Panthers | 63 | (15) |

Senior career*
| Years | Team | Apps | (Gls) |
| 2024 | North Carolina Courage | 2 | (0) |
- * Club domestic league appearances and goals as of July 31, 2024

Lauren Landy Mertz (born July 19, 2000) is an American former professional soccer player. She played college soccer for the Dayton Flyers and Pittsburgh Panthers and was drafted by the North Carolina Courage in the fourth round of the 2024 NWSL Draft.

== Early life ==
Mertz grew up in Pittsburgh, Pennsylvania, the youngest of four children born to Kelly (née Landy) and Rob Mertz. Her father played college soccer for Grove City College; her brother Robbie has played professionally for the Pittsburgh Riverhounds and Atlanta United 2; and her brother Ryan played in college for Delaware.

Mertz recorded 56 goals and 30 assists in her high school career at Upper St. Clair High School. As a freshman in 2015, she helped the Panthers win the PIAA championship and was named the team's Rookie of the Year. She was the team's most valuable player as a sophomore, then captained the team in her last two seasons, though she missed much of her junior year with an ankle injury. In her senior year in 2018, she scored 20 goals and had 15 assists, leading the team to reach the WPIAL semifinals, and was named the Pittsburgh Post-Gazette Girls' Soccer Player of the Year and All-American by the United Soccer Coaches. She played club soccer for Century FC and the Riverhounds Academy, with which she won the US Club Soccer National Cup in 2015.

== College career ==
Mertz played one season at the University of Dayton in 2019, scoring three goals and adding two assists, and was named to the Atlantic 10 Conference's All-Rookie Team. After that season, she transferred to her hometown University of Pittsburgh; coach Randy Waldrum said the program wanted to recruit Mertz earlier, but she had already committed to Dayton. She scored three goals in two appearances in 2020–21, then led the Panthers with seven assists in fifteen games in 2021. She helped Pittsburgh qualify for their first NCAA tournament in 2022, where they lost to Florida State in the third round, and set a program record with 14 wins. The next year, Pittsburgh reached the NCAA tournament quarterfinals, again losing to Florida State, who also beat them in the ACC tournament semifinals. The team surpassed last year's record with 17 wins, and Mertz set a program record with 14 assists on the season. She was named to the All-ACC third team in her last two seasons.

== Club career ==
The North Carolina Courage drafted Mertz with the 52nd overall pick in the fourth round of the 2024 NWSL Draft. She was signed to a three-year contract. She made her professional debut on May 24, substituting in the 84th minute in a 3–0 away defeat to the Houston Dash. On July 31, she scored her first professional goal in the 90th minute in a 3–0 win against Monterrey in the 2024 NWSL x Liga MX Femenil Summer Cup group stage. She was waived by the Courage on December 9.

== Honors ==
Individual

- Third-team All-ACC: 2022, 2023
- ACC tournament all-tournament team: 2023
