= Eva Gaetino =

American soccer player (born 2002)

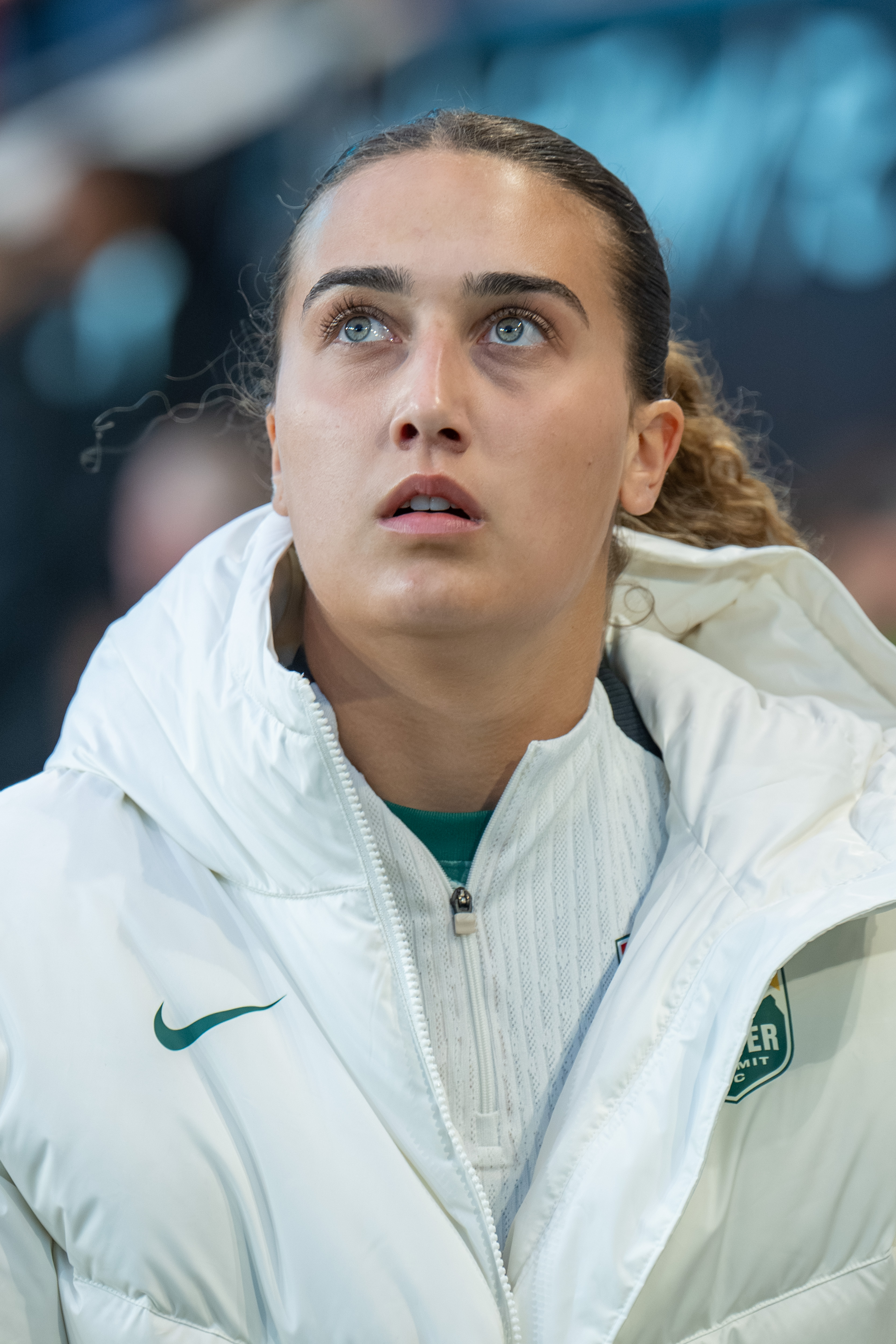
- Gaetino with the Denver Summit in 2026

Personal information
- Full name: Eva Julianna Gaetino
- Date of birth: December 17, 2002 (age 23)
- Place of birth: Chesapeake, Virginia, U.S.
- Height: 5 ft 11 in (1.80 m)
- Position: Center back

Team information
- Current team: Denver Summit
- Number: 23

Youth career
- 2010–2020: Michigan Hawks

College career
Years	Team	Apps	(Gls)
2020–2023	Notre Dame Fighting Irish	76	(6)

Senior career*
Years	Team	Apps	(Gls)
2024–2025	Paris Saint-Germain	30	(0)
2026–	Denver Summit	24	(1)

International career^{‡}
2023–2025	United States U-23	7	(0)
2024–	United States	2	(0)
- * Club domestic league appearances and goals as of 06:36, November 8, 2026 (UTC) ‡ National team caps and goals as of December 2, 2025

Eva Julianna Gaetino (born December 17, 2002) is an American professional soccer player who plays as a center back for Denver Summit FC of the National Women's Soccer League (NWSL) and the United States national team. She played college soccer for the Notre Dame Fighting Irish, earning first-team All-American honors twice. She began her professional career with Paris Saint-Germain, winning the Coupe de France Féminine in her debut season in 2024.

== Early life ==
Born in Chesapeake, Virginia, Gaetino grew up in Dexter, Michigan. She began playing soccer at age two. She joined the Michigan Hawks when she was seven. With the Hawks, she earned all-conference honors three times and won the ECNL national title in 2017. She committed to play college soccer for the Notre Dame Fighting Irish during her freshman year at the Dexter High School.

== College career ==
Gaetino played for the Notre Dame Fighting Irish between 2020 and 2023, scoring 6 goals and starting 75 out of 76 appearances. She moved to center back in college after having grown up as an attacking midfielder or striker. In her junior year in 2022, she anchored a defensive line with Leah Klenke and Waniya Hudson that led the Atlantic Coast Conference (ACC) in shutout percentage with 14 shutouts in 23 games. Notre Dame earned a one seed in the NCAA tournament and made the quarterfinals without conceding in their first three tournament games. In her senior year in 2023, she had career scoring highs with 4 goals and 3 assists in 19 games, helping the Irish finish second in the ACC regular-season standings. In both her junior and senior years, she was named first-team All-American, first-team All-ACC, and the ACC Defensive Player of the Year, joining Malia Berkely as the second player to win the latter award in consecutive seasons.

== Club career ==
=== Paris Saint-Germain ===
Gaetino was considered a top prospect eligible for the 2024 NWSL Draft, but withdrew from the draft to trial with Paris Saint-German. On January 23, she signed her first professional contract with the club, reuniting with Notre Dame teammate and close friend Korbin Shrader. On February 11, she made her professional debut as a 61st-minute substitute for Jade Le Guilly against league rivals Lyon. She assisted the opening goal by Tabitha Chawinga five minutes after entering the match, which ended as a 1–1 draw. She was subsequently a regular starter for manager Jocelyn Prêcheur.

On March 20, 2024, Gaetino scored her first professional goal in her debut in the UEFA Women's Champions League, winning 2–1 away against BK Häcken in the quarterfinals first leg, and becoming the youngest American to score in the Champions League knockout stages. On May 4, she played the entire match in a 1–0 win over Fleury in the Coupe de France Féminine final, winning her first professional trophy. PSG ended the season in their usual place as league runners-up to Lyon, who also eliminated them in the Champions League semifinals.

On July 26, 2024, Gaetino renewed with PSG on a two-year contract. However, she saw relatively inconsistent playing time under new manager Fabrice Abriel, as PSG saw themselves out of the Champions League at the hands of Juventus in qualifying. PSG returned to the Coupe de France Féminine final, but Gaetino was an unused substitute in the penalty shootout defeat to Paris FC. The following season was no better under Paulo César. She made 45 appearances and scored 1 goal in two years with the club.

=== Denver Summit ===
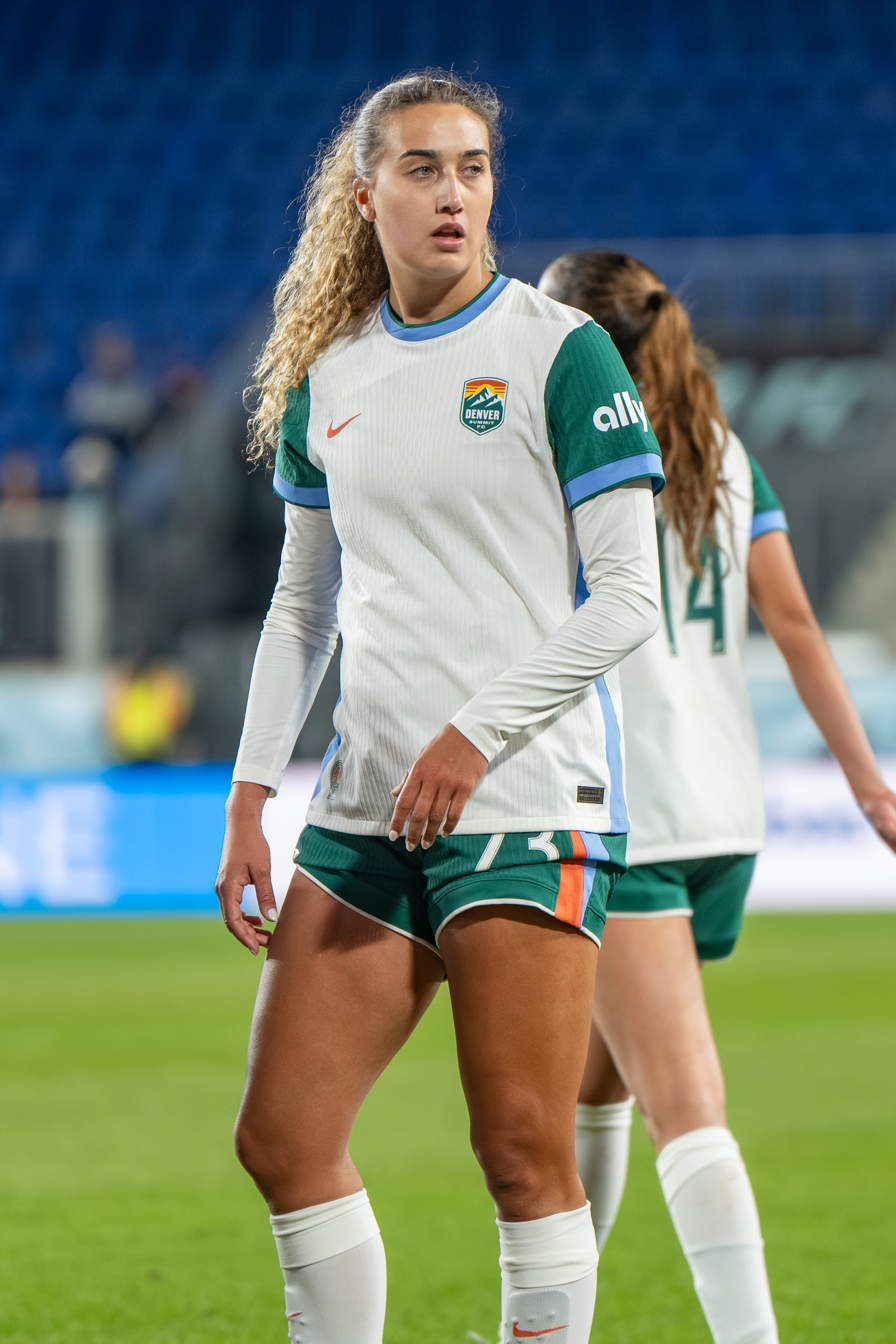
Gaetino with the Denver Summit in 2026

On January 31, 2026, Gaetino transferred to NWSL expansion team Denver Summit FC, signing a three-year contract. She made her NWSL debut in the Summit's inaugural game, playing the entire match in a 2–1 loss to Bay FC on March 14. On May 16, she scored her first NWSL goal in a 3–1 win over the Orlando Pride, crashing the post after a corner kick for the opening goal.

== International career ==
Gaetino made her international debut for the United States under-23 team in January 2023, featuring in two friendlies against France. In March 2024, she was called up to the senior national team for the first time by interim head coach Twila Kilgore as part of the roster for the SheBelieves Cup. Later that year on October 30, she made her senior international debut under head coach Emma Hayes, starting and playing 70 minutes in a 3–0 victory over Argentina in which her center back partner Naomi Girma scored twice. In October 2025, after training with the under-23 team, she was selected to re-join the senior team for the rest of the camp, with Hayes calling her "the most WNT-ready player in this U-23 group", and earning her second cap off the bench against New Zealand.

== Personal life ==
Gaetino is one of four children born to Katherine and Brandon Gaetino. Both of her parents played college soccer, her mother at Virginia Tech and her father at Bucknell. Gaetino's younger sister, Bella, won the national championship with North Carolina as a freshman in 2024.

== Career statistics ==
=== International ===
As of match played October 29, 2025

National Team	Year	Apps	Goals
United States	2024	1	0
United States	2025	1	0
Total		2	0

== Honors and awards ==
Paris Saint-Germain

- Coupe de France Féminine: 2023–24

United States

- SheBelieves Cup: 2024

Individual

- First-team All-American: 2022, 2023
- First-team All-ACC: 2022, 2023
- ACC Defensive Player of the Year: 2022, 2023
