= Amanda West =

Canadian soccer player (born 2001)

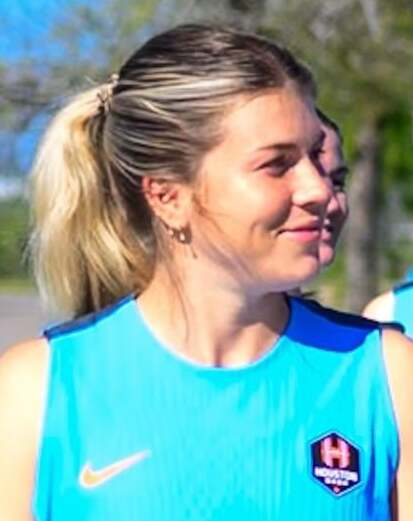
- West with the Houston Dash in 2025

Personal information
- Full name: Amanda Linn West
- Date of birth: February 11, 2001 (age 25)
- Place of birth: Sundsvall, Sweden
- Height: 5 ft 6 in (1.68 m)
- Position: Forward

Team information
- Current team: Houston Dash
- Number: 16

Youth career
- 2017–2018: Burlington SC

College career
Years	Team	Apps	(Gls)
2019–2023	Pittsburgh Panthers	75	(50)

Senior career*
Years	Team	Apps	(Gls)
2024–	Houston Dash	15	(1)
2025	→ AFC Toronto (loan)	0	(0)
2026	→ FC Rosengård (loan)	3	(0)
- * Club domestic league appearances and goals as of 14:46, June 30, 2026 (UTC)

Amanda Linn West (born February 11, 2001) is a Canadian professional soccer player who plays as a forward for the Houston Dash of the National Women's Soccer League (NWSL). She played college soccer for the Pittsburgh Panthers, setting a program record with 50 career goals. She was selected by the Dash in the third round of the 2024 NWSL Draft.

== Early life ==
West was born in Sundsvall, Sweden, to Marc and Christine West, and has an older brother. Her father, who was drafted by the Boston Bruins in the 1985 NHL entry draft, played professional ice hockey overseas. West was raised in Burlington, Ontario, where she played high school soccer for Dr. Frank J. Hayden Secondary School and club soccer for Burlington Soccer Club. She committed to the University of Pittsburgh in June 2018.

== College career ==
West was one of 21 new players for Randy Waldrum's Pittsburgh Panthers in the 2019 season, joining a program that was winless over the last three years. She got off to a quick start with a hat trick in her first game vs. Loyola Marymount, goals in each of her first four games, and a goal or assist in her each of first six games, winning three. She scored an overtime goal to beat Boston College for the program's first ACC win in three years. She ended the season with ten goals and was named to the All-Atlantic Coast Conference third team and all-freshman team, becoming the first Panther to receive conference honors. In the 2020 season, she ranked second in the ACC with 13 goals and was named to the All-ACC second team.

West broke a Panthers program record with her 24th career goal in the first game of the 2021 season and added goals in each of the next four games. She ended the year with ten goals and All-ACC third-team honors. After scoring six goals in six games to start the 2022 season, West tore her ACL and meniscus, ruling her out for the year. The Panthers went on to appear in the ACC tournament and NCAA tournament for the first time.

West returned for her fifth year of eligibility in 2023, scoring 11 goals and receiving All-ACC second-team honors, as the Panthers went 17–6–1, their best record in program history. In the quarterfinals of the 2023 ACC tournament, she scored an overtime goal that led Pittsburgh to defeat North Carolina for the first time and reach the conference semifinals for the first time, with West receiving all-tournament honors. She contributed to the Panthers reaching their first national quarterfinals at the 2023 NCAA tournament, where they lost to eventual champions Florida State. West holds multiple all-time program records, including most goals (50).

== Club career ==
West was selected by the Houston Dash with the 36th pick in the 2024 NWSL Draft, becoming the first Panther to be drafted in the NWSL. She was signed to a one-year contract with an option for an additional year. West made her debut on March 23, substituting at halftime in the home opener against Racing Louisville FC. She recorded her first professional assist, to Diana Ordóñez, in a loss to Portland Thorns FC on April 20. She scored her first professional goal on May 5, helping draw 1–1 against the Kansas City Current. She finished her rookie season with one goal and one assist in 16 appearances (6 starts) as Houston placed last in the league. After the season, she signed a new two-year contract with an option for an additional year.

On April 4, 2025, before the Northern Super League's inaugural season, West joined AFC Toronto on loan until August 18. However, she suffered an ACL injury and returned to the Dash later that month to rehab her injury.

On March 9, 2026, West joined Damallsvenskan club FC Rosengård on a year-long loan with the option to buy. On September 18, her loan was cut short due to persistent knee issues.

== International career ==
West is eligible to represent Canada or Sweden (her mother's home country). In November 2021, West was called into training camp with the Canadian national team, her first call-up at any level.

== Career statistics ==
As of October 13, 2024

Appearances and goals by club, season and competition
Club	League	Season	League		Playoffs		National cup		Other		Total	
Club	League	Season	Apps	Goals	Apps	Goals	Apps	Goals	Apps	Goals	Apps	Goals
Houston Dash	2024	NWSL	15	1	0	0	—		0	0	15	1
Career total			15	1	0	0	0	0	0	0	15	1
