= Brian Pensky =

American soccer coach

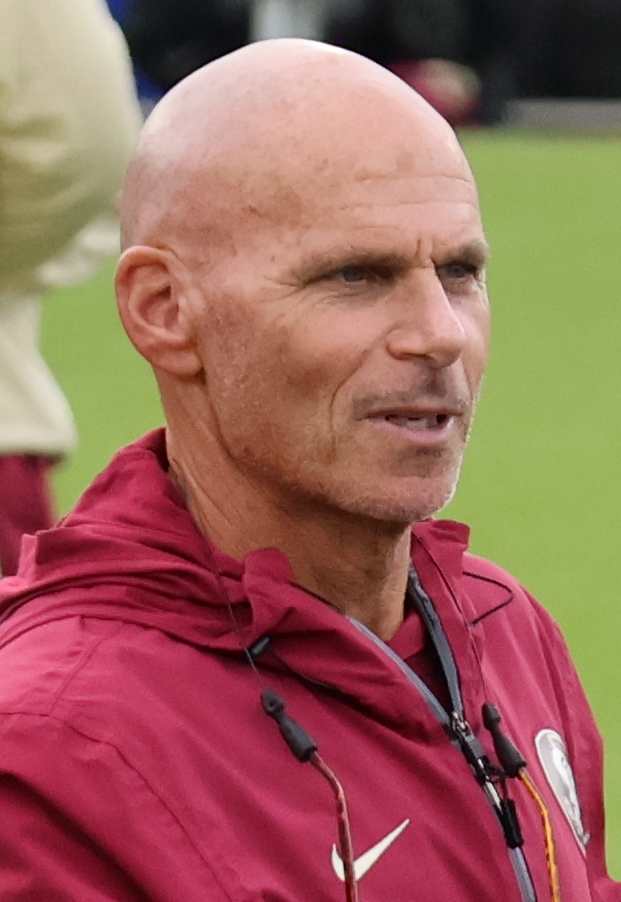
- Pensky with Florida State in 2024

Personal information
- Date of birth: c. 1969 (age 56–57)

Team information
- Current team: Florida State Seminoles (head coach)

Managerial career
- Years: Team
- George Washington (assistant)
- Loyola Greyhounds (assistant)
- 2002–2004: Maryland Terrapins (men) (assistant)
- 2005–2011: Maryland Terrapins
- 2012–2021: Tennessee Volunteers
- 2022–: Florida State Seminoles

Brian Pensky (born c. 1969) is an American college soccer coach who is the head coach of the Florida State Seminoles women's soccer team. He was previously the head coach of the Maryland Terrapins and the Tennessee Volunteers.

== Career ==
Pensky began coaching college soccer as an assistant with the George Washington University women's team. He then assisted at Loyola University Maryland followed by the University of Maryland men's team under Sasho Cirovski.

Pensky became the head coach of the Maryland Terrapins women's team in 2005. He was named the national coach of the year in 2010.

Pensky was hired as head coach of the Tennessee Volunteers women's team in 2012. In his last season, he led the team to their first SEC tournament title in thirteen years and was named the SEC coach of the year in 2021.

Pensky replaced longtime coach Mark Krikorian as the head coach of the Florida State Seminoles women's team in 2022. Many players had come to Florida State because of Krikorian's reputation, and Pensky managed to assuage concerns about the coaching change to keep most players from leaving. In his first season, he led the reigning national champions to defend their ACC title but lost in the semifinals of the NCAA tournament. The next season, Florida State went undefeated on their way to reclaiming the NCAA championship.
