= John Walker Soccer Complex =

Texas sports stadium

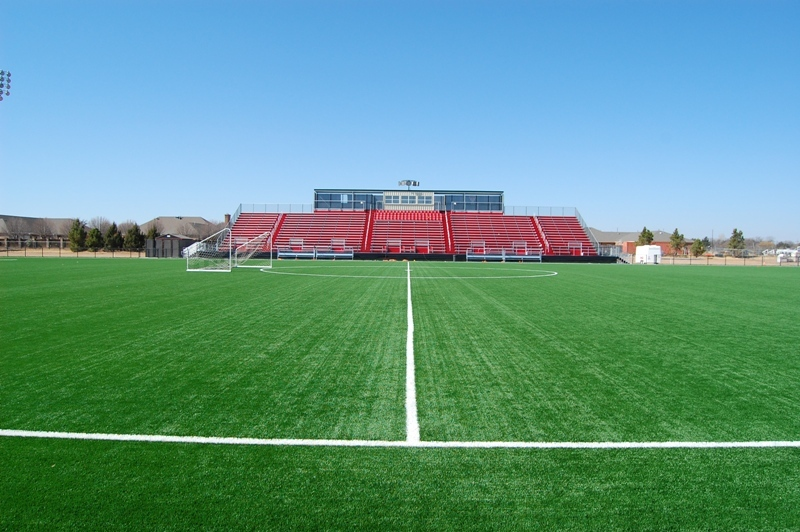
- View of the stadium in 2009
- Interactive map of John Walker Soccer Complex
- Address: 10th Street & Texas Tech Parkway; Lubbock, Texas
- Coordinates: 33.58423°N 101.89951°W
- Owner: Texas Tech University
- Operator: Texas Tech Univ. Athletics
- Capacity: 1,500
- Type: Soccer-specific stadium
- Surface: FieldTurf
- Record attendance: 2,228; Texas Tech vs. Kansas; October 15, 2011

Construction
- Opened: 2008; 18 years ago
- Cost: US$5 Million

Tenant
- Texas Tech women's soccer (2008–present)

Website
- texastech.com/john-walker-soccer-complex

John Walker Soccer Complex is a soccer-specific stadium located in Lubbock, Texas, United States on the campus of Texas Tech University. It has been home to the Texas Tech Red Raiders women's soccer team since 2008.

The John Walker Soccer Complex is the only soccer pitch in the Big 12 Conference equipped with FieldTurf, a mix of synthetic blades of grass supported by an infill of sand and rubber.

The stadium is named after John Walker after he, his wife, Lisa, and their family contributed $2.25 million toward the project, earning the naming rights.

== Amenities ==
The John Walker Soccer Complex, or "The Walker," includes a soccer house outfitted with team locker rooms, athletic training facilities, coaches' offices, coaches' lounge, the Red Raider lounge (a public lounge), a team lounge equipped with a state-of-the art video system for film study, a team weight room and an Under Armour equipment room. Players also have a "boot room" located immediately inside the facility as a place dedicated to their footwear.

In 2012, a 37,800 sq ft climate-controlled indoor soccer facility was added to The Walker adjacent the main field. The indoor facility, named the Gerald Myers Indoor Soccer Facility, allows the Red Raiders their own space to practice indoors in any weather condition.

== Events ==
- NCAA Division I Women's Soccer Tournament First Round: 2012, 2013, 2014, 2016, 2018, 2019

== Record ==
Since the 2008 season, the Walker has had a 74.58% winning percentage for the Red Raiders with the best season coming in 2023 when they went 10-0-0.

Season	W	L	T
2008	5	5	0
2009	5	2	1
2010	7	2	0
2011	7	4	0
2012	9	1	0
2013	10	1	0
2014	8	1	1
2015	7	2	1
2016	7	3	1
2017	5	2	1
2018	8	2	0
2019	6	1	3
2020	2	1	1
2021	9	1	1
2022	5	2	2
2023	10	0	0
2024	7	1	1
Overall	117	31	13
