= Samiah Phiri =

American soccer player (born 2003)

Personal information
- Date of birth: January 14, 2003 (age 23)
- Place of birth: Irving, Texas, United States
- Height: 1.73 m (5 ft 8 in)
- Position: Forward

Team information
- Current team: Thonon Evian GG
- Number: 24

Youth career
- 2018–2020: FC Dallas

College career
Years	Team	Apps	(Gls)
2021–2022	Oklahoma State Cowgirls	18	(5)
2022–2025	Pittsburgh Panthers	63	(22)

Senior career*
Years	Team	Apps	(Gls)
2024–2025	FC Nantes	4	(0)
2025–2026	Thonon Evian GG FC	11	(2)
2026–	Volos		

International career^{‡}
2026–	Zimbabwe		
- * Club domestic league appearances and goals as of 25 October 2026 ‡ National team caps and goals as of 25 October 2026

Samiah Phiri (born January 14, 2003) is a professional football player who plays as a striker for Volos of the Greek A Division. Born in the United States, she represents the Zimbambwe national football team.

== College career ==
As a freshman, Phiri played for the Oklahoma State Cowgirls she appeared in all 18 matches, starting five, and recorded two goals and two assists for six points, along with a game-winning goal in 643 minutes of play.

Phiri played college soccer for the Pittsburgh Panthers from 2022 to 2025. As a junior, she was named to the All-ACC Third Team after recording 11 goals and four assists, including four game-winning goals, while helping Pitt achieve a school-record 17 wins and reach the NCAA Tournament Elite Eight for the first time. In her senior year, she scored a team-high eight goals, including two braces and two game-winning goals, and finished with 19 points in 18 matches. Overall, she made 63 appearances and scored 22 goals, ranking fourth in program history in goals and fifth in points (55).

== Club career ==
Phiri began her career with FC Dallas in 2018 at the age of 15, where she emerged as the club's leading scorer.

In February 2025, Phiri signed her first professional contract with FC Nantes of the Première Ligue, lasting until the end of the season. On June 26, 2025, she departed the Canaries after making five appearances in the yellow and green jersey. On July 19, 2025, She made the move to second-tier Seconde Ligue club Thonon Evian Grand Genève.

== Personal life ==
Phiri was born in Irving, Texas, United States, and is of Zimbabwean descent through her father and paternal grandmother and Zambian descent through her paternal grandfather. She has stated that she would like to represent Zambia internationally, noting that she and her father are in the process of tracing their roots to the country.
