= Big East Conference women's soccer tournament =

- Conference soccer championship
- Sport: College soccer
- Conference: Big East Conference
- Number of teams: 6
- Format: Single-elimination
- Current stadium: Maryland SoccerPlex
- Current location: Boyds, Maryland
- Played: 1993–present
- Last contest: 2026
- Current champion: Villanova (2nd title)
- Most championships: Notre Dame (11)
- TV partner(s): Big East Digital Network, Fox Sports 1
- Official website: bigeast.com/wsoc

The Big East Conference women's soccer tournament is the conference championship tournament in soccer for the Big East Conference. The tournament has been held every year since 1993. It is played under a single-elimination format and seeding is based on regular season records.

The winner, declared conference champion, receives the conference's automatic bid to the NCAA Division I women's soccer championship.

Notre Dame is the most winning team with 11 titles.

== Format ==
The teams are seeded based on the order of finish in the conference's round robin regular season. The top six finishers qualify for the tournament. Tiebreakers begin with the result of the head-to-head matchup. The teams are then placed in a single-elimination bracket, with the top two seeds receiving a first round bye, until meeting in a final championship game. After two overtime period, ties are broken by shootout rounds, with the winner of the shootout advancing.

== Champions ==
Key

- (1) – Title number
- a.e.t. – Match went to extra time
- p – Match decided by a penalty shootout after extra time
- – Winning team won regular season

=== Finals ===
Ed.	Year	Champion	Score	Runner-up	Venue / City	Off. MVP	Def. MVP
1	1993	Providence (1)	1–0	Connecticut	Glay Field • Providence, RI	Jen Mead, Providence	
2	1994	St. John's (1)	1–0	Boston College	Morrone Stadium • Storrs, CT	Cristin Burtis, St. John's	
3	1995	Notre Dame (1)	1–0	Connecticut	Owen T. Carroll Field • South Orange, NJ	Amy Van Lacke, Notre Dame	
4	1996	Notre Dame (2)	4–3	Connecticut	Alumni Stadium • Notre Dame, IN	Cindy Daws, Notre Dame	
5	1997	Notre Dame (3)	6–1	Connecticut	Yurcak Field • Piscataway, NJ	Anne Makinen, Notre Dame	
6	1998	Notre Dame (4)	1–0	Connecticut	Morrone Stadium • Storrs, CT	Anne Makinen, Notre Dame	
7	1999	Notre Dame (5)	4–2	Connecticut	Yurcak Field • Piscataway, NJ	Jenny Streiffer, Notre Dame	
8	2000	Notre Dame (6)	1–0	Connecticut	Alumni Stadium • Notre Dame, IN	Mia Sarkesian, Notre Dame	
9	2001	Notre Dame (7)	2–1	West Virginia	Yurcak Field • Piscataway, NJ	Amanda Guertin, Notre Dame	
10	2002	Connecticut (1)	1–0	West Virginia	Morrone Stadium • Storrs, CT	Salla Ranta, UConn	
11	2003	Villanova (1)	1–1 (7–6 p)	Boston College	Yurcak Field • Piscataway, NJ	Beth Totman, Boston College	Laura Koch, Villanova
12	2004	Connecticut (2)	2–1	Notre Dame	Morrone Stadium • Storrs, CT	Kristen Gracyk, UConn	Zahra Jalalian, UConn
13	2005	Notre Dame (8)	5–0	Connecticut	Valley Fields • Milwaukee, WI	Katie Thorlakson, Notre Dame	Jill Krivacek, Notre Dame
14	2006	Notre Dame (9)	4–2	Rutgers	Morrone Stadium • Storrs, CT	Kerri Hanks, Notre Dame	Kim Lorenzen, Notre Dame
15	2007	West Virginia (1)	1–1 (5–3 p)	Notre Dame	Dick Dlesk Stadium • Morgantown, WV	Kim Bonilla, West Virginia	Carolyn Blank, West Virginia
16	2008	Notre Dame (10)	1–0 (a.e.t.)	Connecticut	Alumni Stadium • Notre Dame, IN	Melissa Henderson, Notre Dame	Carrie Dew, Notre Dame
17	2009	Notre Dame (11)	2–1	Marquette	Morrone Stadium • Storrs, CT	Lauren Folkes, Notre Dame	Jessica Schuveiller, Notre Dame
18	2010	West Virginia (2)	1–0	South Florida	Yurcak Field • Piscataway, NJ	Meghan Lewis, West Virginia	Kerri Butler, West Virginia
19	2011	West Virginia (3)	2–0	Louisville	Dick Dlesk Stadium • Morgantown, WV	Blake Miller, West Virginia	Bry McCarthy, West Virginia
20	2012	Marquette (1)	1–0	Georgetown	Rentschler Field • East Hartford, CT	Taylor Madigan, Marquette	Ally Miller, Marquette
21	2013	Marquette (2)	2–0	DePaul	Valley Fields • Milwaukee, WI	Mary Luba, Marquette	Emily Jacobson, Marquette
22	2014	DePaul (1)	2–0	Georgetown	Belson Stadium • Queens, NY	Amber Paul, DePaul	Sarah Gorden, DePaul
23	2015	Butler (1)	1–0	Providence	Morrison Stadium • Omaha, NE	Catherine Zimmerman, Providence	Randi DeLong, Butler
24	2016	Georgetown (1)	2–0	Marquette	Shaw Field • Washington, D.C.	Grace Damaska, Georgetown	Marian Paul, Georgetown
25	2017	Georgetown (2)	3–0	Butler	Campus Sites (Note: Hosted by higher seed.)	Rachel Corboz, Georgetown	Elizabeth Wenger, Georgetown
26	2018	Georgetown (3)	1–0	Butler	Campus Sites	Caitlin Farrell, Georgetown	Kelly Ann Livingstone, Georgetown
27	2019	Xavier (1)	2–0	Georgetown	Morrison Stadium • Omaha, NE (Note: Venue for semifinals and final.)	Brooke Sroka, Xavier	Grace Bahr, Xavier
28	2021 (Spring)	Georgetown (4)	2–1 (a.e.t.)	Butler	Chapey Field • Providence, RI	Jenna Menta, Georgetown	Julia Leas, Georgetown
29	2021	Georgetown (5)	1–0	St. John's	Corcoran Field • Cincinnati, OH	Sydney Cummings, Georgetown	Julia Leas, Georgetown
30	2022	Georgetown (5)	1–0	Xavier	Maryland SoccerPlex • Boyds, MD	Tatum Lenain, Georgetown	Julia Leas, Georgetown
31	2023	Georgetown (6)	2–0	Xavier	Maryland SoccerPlex • Boyds, MD	Allie Winstanley, Georgetown	Brianne Riley, Georgetown
32	2024	Connecticut (3)	2–1 (a.e.t.)	Xavier	Maryland SoccerPlex • Boyds, MD	Lucy Cappadona, Connecticut	Chioma Okafor, Connecticut
33	2025	Xavier (2)	2–0	Georgetown	Maryland SoccerPlex • Boyds, MD	Samantha Erbach, Xavier	Elizabeth Powell, Xavier
34	2026	Villanova (2)	2–1	Xavier	Maryland SoccerPlex • Boyds, MD	Morgan Kotch, Villanova	Hannah Dickinson, Villanova

=== By school ===
As of 2026 Tournament

School	Apps.	W	L	T	Pct.	Finals	Titles	Title Years
Boston College	9	8	8	1	.500	2	0	—
Butler	11	7	8	2	.471	4	1	2015
Cincinnati	1	1	1	0	.500	0	0	—
Connecticut	25	25	19	6	.560	12	3	2002, 2004, 2024
Creighton	4	0	3	1	.125	0	0	—
DePaul	11	5	7	5	.441	2	1	2014
Georgetown	23	17	9	4	.633	11	7	2016, 2017, 2018, 2021 (Spring), 2021, 2022, 2023
Louisville	7	4	5	2	.455	1	0	—
Marquette	14	14	10	2	.577	3	2	2012, 2013
Miami (FL)	5	0	5	0	.000	0	0	—
Notre Dame	17	37	5	1	.872	13	11	1995, 1996, 1997, 1998, 1999, 2000, 2001, 2005, 2006, 2008, 2009
Pittsburgh	5	0	5	0	.000	0	0	—
Providence	11	6	10	3	.395	2	1	1993
Rutgers	15	3	14	3	.225	1	0	—
Seton Hall	7	2	7	0	.222	0	0	—
St. John's	18	9	14	1	.396	2	1	1994
South Florida	4	3	3	2	.500	1	0	—
Syracuse	6	2	6	0	.250	0	0	—
Villanova	19	7	16	4	.333	2	2	2003, 2026
West Virginia	12	16	7	4	.667	5	3	2007, 2010, 2011
Xavier	9	7	7	2	.500	6	2	2019, 2025

Teams in italics no longer sponsor women's soccer in the Big East.
