= 2022 Big East Conference women's soccer tournament =

- Classification: Division I
- Teams: 6
- Matches: 5
- Attendance: 2,001
- Site: Maryland SoccerPlex (Semifinals and finals); Boyds, Maryland
- Champions: Georgetown (6th title)
- Winning coach: Dave Nolan (6th title)
- MVP: Tatum Lenain (Offensive); Julia Leas (Defensive) (Georgetown)
- Broadcast: Big East Network (quarterfinals and semifinals), Fox Sports 1 (Final)

2022 Big East Conference women's soccer standings
	Conf.						Overall
Team	W		L		T	PCT	W		L		T	PCT
No. 19 Georgetown ‍†‍‡‍^{y}	8	–	0	–	2	.900	15	–	2	–	5	.795
Xavier ‍‍‍^{y}	6	–	0	–	4	.800	14	–	4	–	5	.717
St. John's ‍‍‍	4	–	2	–	3	.611	7	–	5	–	7	.553
Creighton ‍‍‍	4	–	3	–	3	.550	8	–	4	–	8	.600
Butler ‍‍‍	4	–	3	–	3	.550	7	–	7	–	5	.500
Connecticut ‍‍‍	4	–	4	–	2	.500	8	–	6	–	4	.556
Marquette ‍‍‍	3	–	4	–	3	.450	7	–	7	–	4	.500
Villanova ‍‍‍	3	–	5	–	2	.400	4	–	8	–	4	.375
Providence ‍‍‍	2	–	4	–	4	.400	4	–	9	–	5	.361
DePaul ‍‍‍	1	–	7	–	1	.167	3	–	12	–	1	.219
Seton Hall ‍‍‍	1	–	8	–	1	.150	5	–	10	–	3	.361
† – Conference champion ‡ – 2022 Big East Tournament champion y – Invited to the NCAA Tournament; As of December 6, 2022; Rankings from United Soccer Coaches Poll; Source:The Big East Conference

The 2022 Big East Conference women's soccer tournament was the postseason women's soccer tournament for the Big East Conference held from October 30 through November 6, 2022. The five-match tournament took place at the Maryland SoccerPlex in Boyds, Maryland for the semifinals and finals, while the first-round games were hosted by the higher seeded team. The six-team single-elimination tournament consisted of three rounds based on seeding from regular season conference play. The defending champions were the Georgetown Hoyas. They successfully defended their title by defeating Xavier in the final 1–0. This is the sixth title in program history for Georgetown and head coach Dave Nolan. All six of their titles have come in the last seven years and Georgetown has now won three straight titles. As tournament champions, Georgetown earned the Big East's automatic berth into the 2022 NCAA Division I women's soccer tournament.

== Seeding ==
The top six teams in the regular season earned a spot in the tournament. A tiebreaker was required to determine the third, fourth and fifth seeds for the tournament as St. John's, Butler and Creighton all finished with fifteen points after the regular season. After the tiebreakers, St. John's was awarded the third seed, Butler earned the fourth seed and hosting rights, while Creighton was the fifth seed.

Seed	School	Conference Record	Points
1	Georgetown	8–0–2	26
2	Xavier	6–0–4	22
3	St. John's	4–2–3	15
4	Butler	4–3–3	15
5	Creighton	4–3–3	15
6	Connecticut	4–4–2	14

== Bracket ==
First round Sunday, Oct. 30
4	Butler	1 (5)
5	Creighton (pen.)	1 (6)
3	St. John's (pen.)	1 (4)
6	Connecticut	1 (2)

Semifinals; Thursday, Nov. 3
1	Georgetown	1
5	Creighton	0
2	Xavier (a.e.t.)	3
3	St. John's	1

Final; Sunday, Nov. 6
1	Georgetown	1
2	Xavier	0

== Schedule ==
=== Quarterfinals ===
October 30	#3 St. John's	1–1 (a.e.t.) (4–2 p)	#6 Connecticut	Queens, NY
1:00 p.m.	Isabelle Aviza 70'	Report	52' Chioma Okafor	Stadium: Belson Stadium; Attendance: 320; Referee: Shaun Papperman; Assistant referees: Kyle O'Grady; Chris Muhs; Fourth official: Greg Muhs
	Penalties
	Jessica Garziano (penalty scored); Athina Sofroniou (penalty missed); Molly Feighan (penalty scored); Melina Couzis (penalty scored); Michelle Money (penalty scored)		(penalty scored) Emma Zaccagnini; (penalty missed) Abbey Jones; (penalty missed) Jackie Harnett; (penalty scored) Jessica Mazo

October 30	#4 Butler	1–1 (a.e.t.) (5–6 p)	#5 Creighton	Indianapolis, IN
1:00 p.m.	Abigail Isger 83'; Talia Sommer (yellow card) 87'	Report	72' Juelle Love; (yellow card) 92' Gabby Grimaldi; (yellow card) 102' Team; (yellow card) 110' Ariana Mondiri	Stadium: Butler Bowl; Attendance: 462; Referee: Eric Tattersall; Assistant referees: Khary Williams; Erin Patterson; Fourth official: Jason Gordon
	Penalties
	Talia Sommer (penalty scored); Abigail Isger (penalty scored); Becky Dean (penalty scored); Aliya Diagne (penalty scored); Sara Trandji (penalty scored); Claire Farrington (penalty missed); Emily O'Malley (penalty missed)		(penalty scored) Aida Kardovic; (penalty scored) Ariana Mondiri; (penalty scored) Lara Kazandjian; (penalty scored) Maddie Radke; (penalty scored) Ansley Atkinson; (penalty missed) Abigail Santana; (penalty scored) Azumi Manriki

=== Semifinals ===
November 3	#2 Xavier	3–1 (a.e.t.)	#3 St. John's	Boyds, MD
4:00 p.m.	Emma Flick 79'; Molly McLaughlin 95'; Chole Netzel 99'	Report	23' Jessica Garziano; (yellow card) 66' Nicole Gordon	Stadium: Maryland SoccerPlex; Attendance: 101; Referee: Stephen Foster; Assistant referees: Balvir Cabrera; Nickrod Fateh; Fourth official: Said Mahious

November 3	#1 Georgetown	1–0	#5 Creighton	Boyds, MD
6:30 p.m.	Gia Vicari 19'	Report		Stadium: Maryland SoccerPlex; Attendance: 115; Referee: Stephen Foster; Assistant referees: Balvir Cabrera; Nickrod Fateh; Fourth official: Said Mahious

=== Final ===
November 6	#1 Georgetown	1–0	#2 Xavier	Boyds, MD
1:30 p.m.	Tatum Lenain 59'; Julia Leas (yellow card) 84'	Report		Stadium: Maryland SoccerPlex; Attendance: 1,003; Referee: Mike DeFelice; Assistant referees: Sharon Gingrich; Marie Durr; Fourth official: Moo Hackett

== Statistics ==
=== Goalscorers ===
There were 10 goals scored in 5 matches, for an average of 2 goals per match (as of November 6, 2022).

1 goal

- Abigail Isger – Butler
- Juelle Love – Creighton
- Chioma Okafor – Connecticut
- Tatum Lenain – Georgetown
- Gia Vicari – Georgetown
- Isabelle Aviza – St. John's
- Jessica Garziano – St. John's
- Emma Flick – Xavier
- Molly McLaughlin – Xavier
- Chole Netzel – Xavier

== All-Tournament team ==
Player	Team
Gabby Grimaldi	Creighton
Abigail Santana	Creighton
Allie Augur	Georgetown
Maya Fernandez-Powell	Georgetown
Maja Lardner	Georgetown
Julia Leas^	Georgetown
Tatum Lenain*	Georgetown
Melina Couzis	St. John's
Katherine Turner	St. John's
Emma Flick	Xavier
Molly McLaughlin	Xavier
Chloe Netzel	Xavier

* Offensive MVP
^ Defensive MVP
