= 2023 Big East Conference women's soccer tournament =

- Classification: Division I
- Teams: 6
- Matches: 5
- Attendance: 2,919
- Site: Maryland SoccerPlex (Semifinals and finals); Boyds, Maryland
- Champions: Georgetown (7th title)
- Winning coach: Dave Nolan (7th title)
- MVP: Allie Winstanley (Offensive); Brianne Riley (Defensive) (Georgetown)
- Broadcast: FloSports (quarterfinals and semifinals), Fox Sports 1 (Final)

2023 Big East Conference women's soccer standings
	Conf.						Overall
Team	W		L		T	PCT	W		L		T	PCT
Xavier ‍†‍‍^{y}	6	–	0	–	4	.800	14	–	4	–	4	.727
Georgetown ‍†‍‡‍^{y}	6	–	0	–	4	.800	13	–	2	–	7	.750
UConn ‍‍‍	6	–	1	–	3	.750	10	–	4	–	5	.658
Providence ‍‍‍^{y}	4	–	1	–	5	.650	10	–	8	–	5	.543
St. John's ‍‍‍	5	–	4	–	1	.550	10	–	6	–	3	.605
Butler ‍‍‍	2	–	3	–	5	.450	6	–	8	–	6	.450
Seton Hall ‍‍‍	2	–	4	–	4	.400	6	–	7	–	5	.472
DePaul ‍‍‍	2	–	5	–	3	.350	6	–	7	–	4	.471
Marquette ‍‍‍	2	–	6	–	2	.300	5	–	10	–	4	.368
Creighton ‍‍‍	2	–	7	–	1	.250	4	–	9	–	5	.361
Villanova ‍‍‍	1	–	7	–	2	.200	4	–	7	–	7	.417
† – Conference champion ‡ – 2023 Big East Tournament champion y – Invited to the NCAA Tournament; As of December 5, 2023; Rankings from United Soccer Coaches Poll; Source: The Big East Conference

The 2023 Big East Conference women's soccer tournament was the postseason women's soccer tournament for the Big East Conference held from October 29 through November 5, 2023. The five-match tournament took place at the Maryland SoccerPlex in Boyds, Maryland for the semifinals and finals, while the first-round games were hosted by the higher seeded team. The six-team single-elimination tournament consisted of three rounds based on seeding from regular season conference play. The defending champions were the Georgetown Hoyas. They successfully defended their title by defeating Xavier in the final 2–0. This was the second straight year that Georgetown defeated Xavier in the Final. This is the seventh title in program history for Georgetown and head coach Dave Nolan. All seven of their titles have come in the last eight years and Georgetown has now won four straight titles. As tournament champions, Georgetown earned the Big East's automatic berth into the 2023 NCAA Division I women's soccer tournament.

== Seeding ==
The top six teams in the regular season earned a spot in the tournament. A tiebreaker was required to determine the first and second seeds for the tournament after Xavier and Georgetown finished the regular season with identical 6–1–4 regular season conference records. The two teams tied 0–0 in their October 6 regular season match up so a second tiebreaker was used. The second tiebreaker was points earned versus teams qualified for the Big East tournament. Xavier was awarded the first seed while Georgetown was the second seed.

Seed	School	Conference Record	Points
1	Xavier	6–1–4	22
2	Georgetown	6–1–4	22
3	UConn	6–1–3	21
4	Providence	4–1–5	17
5	St. John's	5–4–1	16
6	Butler	2–3–5	11

== Bracket ==
First round Sunday, Oct. 29
4	Providence	3
5	St. John's	1
3	UConn	3
6	Butler	2

Semifinals; Thursday, Nov. 2
1	Xavier	2
4	Providence	0
2	Georgetown	1
3	UConn	0

Final; Sunday, Nov. 5
1	Xavier	0
2	Georgetown	2

== Schedule ==
=== Quarterfinals ===
October 29	#3 UConn	3–2	#6 Butler	Storrs, CT
1:00 p.m.	Jessica Mazo 3'; Chioma Okafor 25', 89'; Emma Zaccagnini (yellow card) 33'	Report	45' Talia Sommer; 70' Norah Jacomen	Stadium: Morrone Stadium; Attendance: 475; Referee: Dave Brekner; Assistant referees: Adam Cook; Aaron Selenica; Fourth official: Jeff Ardis

October 29	#4 Providence	3–1	#5 St. John's	Providence, RI
1:00 p.m.	Gillian Kenney 31', 64'; Avery Snead 59'	Report	89' (pen.) Jessica Garziano	Stadium: Chapey Field; Attendance: 267

=== Semifinals ===
November 2	#1 Xavier	2–0	#4 Providence	Boyds, MD
4:00 p.m.	Sonia Vargas 43'; Shelby Sallee 69'	Report	(yellow card) 77' Gillian Kenney; (yellow card) 88' Victoria Bunz	Stadium: Maryland SoccerPlex; Attendance: 527; Referee: Marie Durr; Assistant referees: Sharon Gingrich; Matthew Richardson; Fourth official: George Vergara Jr.

November 2	#2 Georgetown	1–0	#3 UConn	Boyds, MD
6:30 p.m.	Tatum Lenain 48'	Report		Stadium: Maryland SoccerPlex; Attendance: 647; Referee: Lucas Feathers; Assistant referees: Ryan Trombeta; Michael Kelley; Fourth official: Alla Stepanov

=== Final ===
November 5	#1 Xavier	0–2	#2 Georgetown	Boyds, MD
1:30 p.m.		Report	13' Allie Winstanley; (yellow card) 40' Grace Sherman; 62' Maja Lardner	Stadium: Maryland SoccerPlex; Attendance: 1,003; Referee: Ashley Cedro; Assistant referees: Max Elsasser; Dustin Killick; Fourth official: Nickrod Fateh

== Statistics ==
=== Goalscorers ===
There were 14 goals scored in 5 matches, for an average of 2.8 goals per match (as of November 5, 2023).

2 goals

- Gillian Kenney – Providence
- Chioma Okafor – UConn

1 goal

- Norah Jacomen – Butler
- Talia Sommer – Butler
- Maja Lardner – Georgetown
- Tatum Lenain – Georgetown
- Allie Winstanley – Georgetown
- Avery Snead – Providence
- Jessica Garziano – St. John's
- Jessica Mazo – UConn
- Shelby Sallee – Xavier
- Sonia Vargas – Xavier

== All-Tournament team ==
Player	Team
Cara Jordan	UConn
Chioma Okafor	UConn
Erika Harwood	Georgetown
Maja Lardner	Georgetown
Natalie Means	Georgetown
Brianne Riley^	Georgetown
Allie Winstanley*	Georgetown
Kyla Gallagher	Providence
Avery Snead	Providence
Natalie Bain	Xavier
Shelby Sallee	Xavier
Sonia Vargas	Xavier

* Offensive MVP
^ Defensive MVP
