= 2025 Big East Conference women's soccer tournament =

- Classification: Division I
- Teams: 4
- Matches: 3
- Attendance: 1,825
- Site: Maryland SoccerPlex, Boyds
- Champions: Xavier (2nd title)
- Winning coach: Dean Ward (1st title)
- MVP: Elizabeth Powell (Defensive); Samantha Erbach (Offensive) (Xavier)
- Broadcast: ESPN+

2025 Big East Conference women's soccer standings
	Conf.						Overall
Team	W		L		T	PCT	W		L		T	PCT
No. 9т Georgetown ‍†‍‍^{y}	10	–	0	–	0	1.000	16	–	4	–	3	.761
No. 25 Xavier ‍‍‡‍^{y}	8	–	1	–	1	.850	16	–	4	–	2	.773
Connecticut ‍‍‍	7	–	1	–	2	.800	11	–	4	–	3	.694
Creighton ‍‍‍	4	–	3	–	3	.550	7	–	8	–	4	.474
Villanova ‍‍‍	4	–	5	–	1	.450	9	–	8	–	1	.528
Providence ‍‍‍	3	–	4	–	3	.450	6	–	6	–	4	.500
Marquette ‍‍‍	3	–	4	–	3	.450	7	–	7	–	4	.500
Butler ‍‍‍	2	–	3	–	5	.450	5	–	4	–	8	.529
St. John's ‍‍‍	1	–	6	–	3	.250	3	–	9	–	5	.324
DePaul ‍‍‍	1	–	7	–	2	.200	4	–	12	–	2	.278
Seton Hall ‍‍‍	0	–	9	–	1	.050	3	–	10	–	5	.306
† – Conference champion ‡ – 2025 Big East Tournament champion y – Invited to the NCAA Tournament; As of December 9, 2025; Rankings from United Soccer Coaches Poll; Source:The Big East Conference

The 2025 Big East Conference women's soccer tournament was the postseason women's soccer tournament for the Big East Conference that was held from November 6 to 9, 2025. The three-match tournament took place at the Maryland SoccerPlex in Boyds, Maryland. The four-team single-elimination tournament consisted of two rounds based on seeding from regular season conference play. The defending champions were Connecticut. Connecticut failed to defend their title, as they were knocked out in the semifinals by Xavier. Xavier would go on to win the title, defeating Georgetown 2−0 in the final. It was the second title for Xavier since 2019, and the first title for head coach Dean Ward.

As tournament champions, Xavier earned the Big East's automatic berth into the 2025 NCAA Division I women's soccer tournament.

== Seeding ==
The top four teams in the regular season earned a spot in the tournament. Teams were seeded based on regular season conference records. No tiebreakers were required as the top seven teams all finished with unique conference records.

Seed	School	Conference Record	Points
1	Georgetown	10–0–0	30
2	Xavier	8–1–1	25
3	Connecticut	7–1–2	23
4	Creighton	4–3–3	15

== Bracket ==
Semifinals; Thursday, Nov. 6
1	Georgetown	2
4	Creighton	0
2	Xavier	7
3	Connecticut	0

Final; Sunday, Nov. 9
1	Georgetown	0
2	Xavier	2

== Schedule ==
=== Semifinals ===
November 6, 2025	#2 Xavier	7–0	#3 Connecticut	Boyds, MD
17:00 EST	Samantha Erbach 30', 44', 72'; Elin Hansson 47'; Regan Dancer 55'; Presley Pennekamp 76'; Penny Brill 89'	Report	Anaya Johnson (yellow card) 31'	Stadium: Maryland SoccerPlex; Attendance: 506; Referee: Aaron Rawlins; Assistant referees: Justin Geho; Kyle Radziewicz; Fourth official: Joe Law

November 6, 2025	#1 Georgetown	2–0	#4 Creighton	Boyds, MD
19:30 EST	Henley Tippins 33'; Maja Lardner 62'	Report		Stadium: Maryland SoccerPlex; Attendance: 541; Referee: Adam Klipatrick; Assistant referees: Josh Pitt; Jeffrey Skinker; Fourth official: Angelo Petruccy

=== Final ===
November 9, 2025	#1 Georgetown	0–2	#2 Xavier	Boyds, MD
12:00 EST	Henley Tippins (yellow card) 70'	Report	Samantha Erbach 10' (pen.); Presley Pennekamp (yellow card) 36'; Regan Dancer 79'	Stadium: Maryland SoccerPlex; Attendance: 778; Referee: Mike De Felice; Assistant referees: Randal Von Steuben; Kyle Zach Fingerhut; Fourth official: Gary Gutierrez

== Statistics ==
=== Goalscorers ===
There were 11 goals scored in 3 matches, for an average of 3.67 goals per match (as of November 9, 2025).

4 goals

- Samantha Erbach – Xavier

2 goals

- Regan Dancer – Xavier

1 goal

- Penny Brill – Xavier
- Elin Hansson – Xavier
- Maja Lardner – Georgetown
- Presley Pennekamp – Xavier
- Henley Tippins – Georgetown

== All-Tournament team ==
Player	Team
Anna Carson	Connecticut
Chioma Okafor	Connecticut
Tori Gillis	Creighton
Alyssa Zalac	Creighton
Kaya Hanson	Georgetown
Maja Lardner	Georgetown
Henley Tippins	Georgetown
Regan Dancer	Xavier
Samantha Erbach*	Xavier
Emma Flick	Xavier
Elizabeth Powell^	Xavier

* Offensive MVP
^ Defensive MVP
