= 2019 Big East Conference women's soccer tournament =

Sports competition

- Classification: Division I
- Teams: 6
- Matches: 5
- Attendance: 1,137
- Site: Morrison Stadium; Omaha, Nebraska
- Champions: Xavier (1st title)
- Winning coach: Nate Lie (1st title)
- MVP: Brooke Sroka (Offensive); Grace Bahr (Defensive) (Xavier)
- Broadcast: Big East Network (Quarterfinals and Semifinals), Fox Sports 1 (Final)

2019 Big East Conference women's soccer standings
	Conf.						Overall
Team	W		L		T	PCT	W		L		T	PCT
No. 24 Xavier ‍†‍‡‍^{y}	7	–	2	–	0	.778	17	–	4	–	2	.783
Georgetown ‍‍‍^{y}	6	–	1	–	2	.778	13	–	5	–	3	.690
Butler ‍‍‍	5	–	2	–	2	.667	10	–	5	–	4	.632
Villanova ‍‍‍	5	–	3	–	1	.611	10	–	7	–	3	.575
DePaul ‍‍‍	5	–	3	–	1	.611	8	–	8	–	3	.500
Providence ‍‍‍	3	–	5	–	1	.389	8	–	9	–	3	.475
Marquette ‍‍‍	3	–	5	–	1	.389	6	–	11	–	1	.361
Creighton ‍‍‍	2	–	4	–	3	.389	8	–	7	–	3	.528
St. John's ‍‍‍	2	–	6	–	1	.278	5	–	12	–	1	.306
Seton Hall ‍‍‍	1	–	8	–	0	.111	2	–	13	–	1	.156
† – Conference champion ‡ – 2019 Big East Tournament champion y – Invited to the NCAA tournament As of December 10, 2019; Rankings from United Soccer Coaches Poll; Source:The Big East Conference

The 2019 Big East Conference women's soccer tournament was the postseason women's soccer tournament for the Big East Conference held from November 3 through November 10, 2019. The five-match tournament took place at campus sites, with the higher seed hosting each game. The six-team single-elimination tournament consisted of three rounds based on seeding from regular season conference play. The defending champions were the Georgetown Hoyas. However, they were unable to defend their crown, losing to Xavier 2–0 in the final. This is the first title in program history for Xavier, and the first for head coach Nate Lie.

== Bracket ==
First round Sunday, Nov. 3
4	Villanova	1
5	DePaul	0
3	Butler	1 (4)
6	Providence	1 (5)

Semifinals; Thursday, Nov. 7
1	Xavier	2
4	Villanova	0
2	Georgetown	2
6	Providence	0

Final; Sunday, Nov. 10
1	Xavier	2
2	Georgetown	0

== Schedule ==
=== Quarterfinals ===
November 3, 2019	#4 Villanova	1–0	#5 DePaul	Villanova, PA
1:00 p.m.	Shannon Casey 29'; Jane Olcott (yellow card) 77'	Report	Gwen Walker (yellow card) 83'	Stadium: Higgins Soccer Complex; Attendance: 307; Referee: Marc Lawrence; Assistant referees: Geoffrey Spector; Jerry Werel; Fourth official: Edwin Shafter

November 3, 2019	#3 Butler	1–1 (a.e.t.) (4–5 p)	#6 Providence	Indianapolis, IN
1:00 p.m.	Anja Savich 38'	Report	82' Hannah McNulty	Stadium: Butler Bowl; Attendance: 200; Referee: Lucas Feathers; Assistant referees: Noah Matos; Casie Anderson; Fourth official: Jacob Johnson
	Penalties
	Carly Goehring (penalty scored); Anja Savich (penalty missed); Alyssa Yarosz (penalty scored); Katie Soderstrom (penalty scored); Becky Dean (penalty scored); Payton Black (penalty missed)		(penalty scored) Jana Braun; (penalty scored) Melissa Bambery; (penalty scored) Celina Falzarano; (penalty scored) Mara Rodriguez; (penalty missed) Mackenzie Simpson; (penalty scored) Elayna Grillakis

=== Semifinals ===
November 7, 2019	#1 Xavier	2–0	#4 Villanova	Omaha, NE
6:00 p.m. EST	Carrie Lewis 14'; Hayley Jakovich 46'; Kristin Barbour (yellow card) 80'	Report		Stadium: Morrison Stadium; Attendance: 152; Referee: Lucas Feathers; Assistant referees: Jeremy Kieso; Matthew Seem; Fourth official: Brittney Hageman

November 7, 2019	#2 Georgetown	2–0	#6 Providence	Omaha, NE
8:30 p.m. ESPN	Kelly Ann Livingstone 31'; Amanda Carolan 56'	Report		Stadium: Morrison Stadium; Attendance: 152; Referee: Mark Buda; Assistant referees: Jamey Walter; Shane LaBenz; Fourth official: Brittny Seem

=== Final ===
November 10, 2019	#1 Xavier	2–0	#2 Georgetown	Omaha, NE
4:00 p.m. EST	Brooke Sroka 10'; Gabrielle LoPresti 35'	Report		Stadium: Morrison Stadium; Attendance: 326; Referee: Marc Lawrence; Assistant referees: Jeremy Kieso; Jamey Walter; Fourth official: Brittny Seem

== Statistics ==
=== Goalscorers ===
1 Goal

- Amanda Carolan (Georgetown)
- Shannon Casey (Villanova)
- Hayley Jakovich (Xavier)
- Carrie Lewis (Xavier)
- Kelly Ann Livingstone (Georgetown)
- Gabrielle LoPresti (Xavier)
- Hannah McNulty (Providence)
- Anja Savich (Butler)
- Brooke Sroka (Xavier)

== All-Tournament team ==
Player	Team
Grace Bahr^	Xavier
Brooke Sroka*	Xavier
Molly McLaughlin	Xavier
Macy Harper	Xavier
Amanda Carolan	Georgetown
Sarah Trissel	Georgetown
Julia Leas	Georgetown
Shelby Hogan	Providence
Mara Rodriguez	Providence
Kristin Barbour	Villanova
Conner Huggins	Villanova

* Offensive MVP
^ Defensive MVP
