= Maja Lardner =

American soccer player (born 2002)

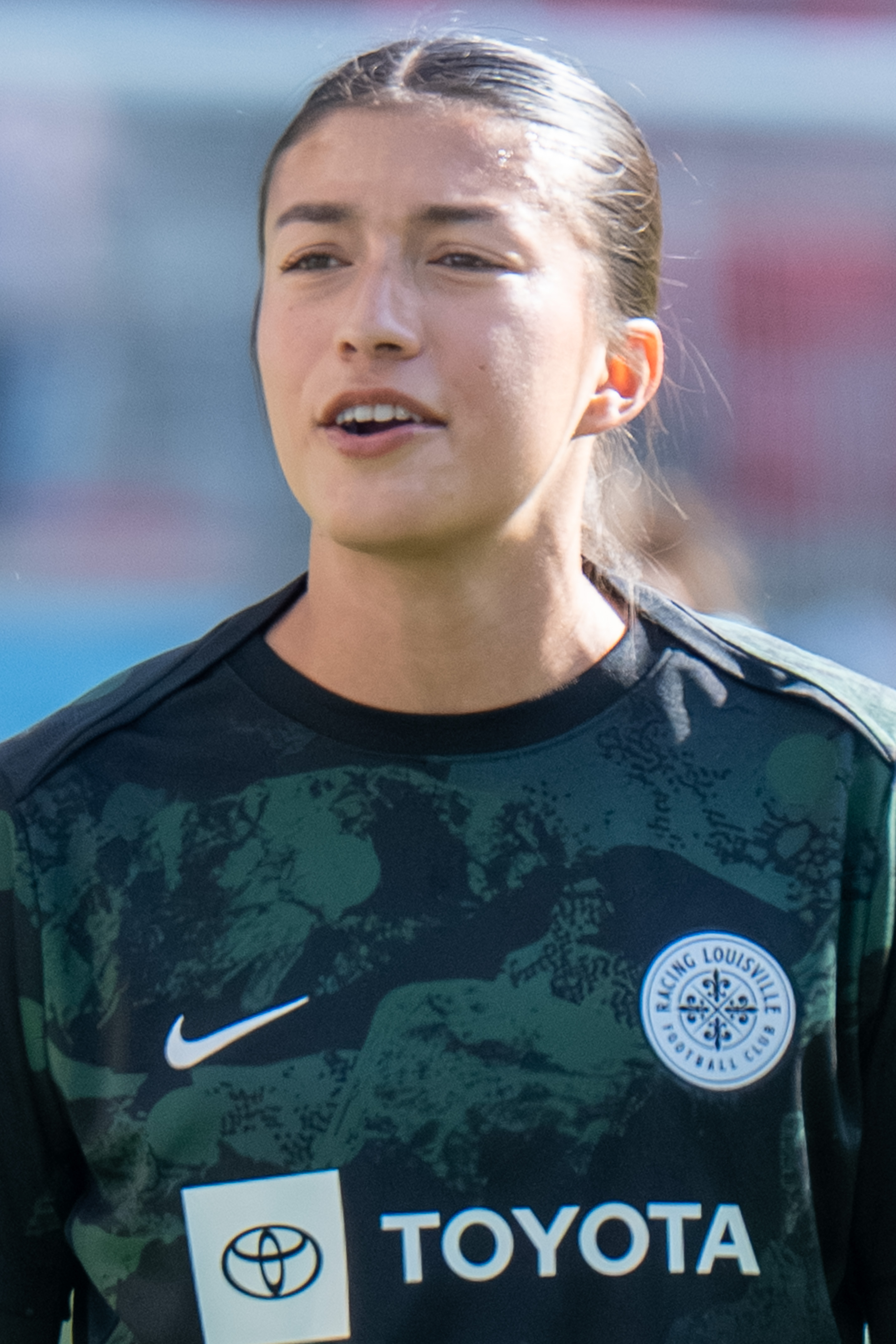
- Lardner with Racing Louisville in 2026

Personal information
- Full name: Maja Lardner
- Date of birth: November 23, 2002 (age 23)
- Height: 5 ft 8 in (1.73 m)
- Position: Forward

Team information
- Current team: Racing Louisville
- Number: 16

Youth career
- Sting SC
- 2017–2021: Highland Park Lady Scots

College career
Years	Team	Apps	(Gls)
2021–2025	Georgetown Hoyas	91	(31)

Senior career*
Years	Team	Apps	(Gls)
2026–	Racing Louisville	23	(2)
- * Club domestic league appearances and goals as of 06:01, November 2, 2026 (UTC)

Maja Lardner (born November 23, 2002) is an American professional soccer player who plays as a forward for Racing Louisville FC of the National Women's Soccer League (NWSL). She played college soccer for the Georgetown Hoyas, earning second-team All-American honors in 2025.

== Early life ==
Lardner grew up in Dallas, Texas. She played high school soccer at Highland Park High School, winning the UIL 5A state championship and being named the state final MVP as a sophomore in 2019. That year, she also committed to play college soccer for the Georgetown Hoyas. She was twice named All-American by United Soccer Coaches. She played ECNL club soccer for Sting SC.

== College career ==
Lardner played in 9 games and scored 1 goal for the Georgetown Hoyas as a freshman in 2021. She played in 22 games and scored 2 goals with 6 assists as a sophomore in 2022. She helped Georgetown win the Big East Conference regular-season and tournament titles, going undefeated in conference play. In her junior year in 2023, she scored 3 goals in 16 games as the Hoyas repeated in both titles, again with an undefeated conference record.

Lardner had a breakthrough senior season in 2024, starting all 21 games, leading the team with 11 goals, and adding 6 assists. She helped lead Georgetown to their third consecutive regular-season crown and was named first-team All-Big East and the Big East Offensive Player of the Year. She later said that only after her "really good senior year" did she realize she had the ability to play professionally.

Lardner returned for her fifth and final season as a graduate student in 2025, again starting all 23 games, leading the team with 14 goals, and adding 4 assists. She led the Hoyas to a perfect 10–0 record in the Big East, winning a fourth consecutive regular-season title, and helped reach the NCAA tournament round of 16 for the first time since 2020, losing to eventual champions Florida State. She repeated as first-team All-Big East and Big East Offensive Player of the Year and was named second-team All-American.

== Club career ==
Racing Louisville FC announced on January 16, 2026, that they had signed Lardner to her first professional contract on a two-year deal with the mutual option for another year. After recovering from a hip injury to start the season, she made her professional debut on April 24, replacing Sarah Weber as a stoppage-time substitute in 3–2 victory over the Orlando Pride, Racing's first win of the season. On July 26, in just her second start, she scored her first professional goals – both scores for her side in a 2–1 win over Angel City FC.

== Honors and awards ==
Georgetown Hoyas

- Big East Conference: 2022, 2023, 2024, 2025
- Big East Conference tournament: 2021, 2022, 2023

Individual

- Second-team All-American: 2025
- First-team All-Big East: 2024, 2025
- Big East Offensive Player of the Year: 2024, 2025
- Big East tournament all-tournament team: 2022, 2023, 2025
