= 2017 Big East Conference women's soccer tournament =

- Classification: Division I
- Teams: 6
- Matches: 5
- Attendance: 1,975
- Site: Campus sites
- Champions: Georgetown (2nd title)
- Winning coach: Dave Nolan (2nd title)

2017 Big East Conference women's soccer standings
	Conf.						Overall
Team	W		L		T	PCT	W		L		T	PCT
#24 Georgetown †‡^{y} ‍‍‍	6	–	1	–	2	.778	14	–	3	–	4	.762
Butler ‍‍‍^{y}	5	–	0	–	4	.778	13	–	2	–	6	.762
Providence ‍‍‍	5	–	3	–	1	.611	10	–	8	–	2	.550
Marquette ‍‍‍	5	–	4	–	0	.556	13	–	7	–	1	.643
Xavier ‍‍‍	4	–	3	–	2	.556	8	–	8	–	4	.500
DePaul ‍‍‍	3	–	2	–	4	.556	7	–	7	–	5	.500
St. John's ‍‍‍	4	–	5	–	0	.444	8	–	9	–	1	.472
Creighton ‍‍‍	2	–	5	–	2	.333	4	–	11	–	3	.306
Villanova ‍‍‍	2	–	7	–	0	.222	6	–	12	–	0	.333
Seton Hall ‍‍‍	0	–	6	–	3	.167	0	–	12	–	5	.147
† – Conference champion ‡ – 2017 Big East Tournament champion y – Invited to the NCAA tournament As of November 12, 2017; Rankings from United Soccer Coaches Poll; Source:The Big East Conference

The 2017 Big East Conference women's soccer tournament was the postseason women's soccer tournament for the Big East Conference held from October 29 through November 5, 2017. The five-match tournament took place at campus sites, with the higher seed hosting each game. The six-team single-elimination tournament consisted of three rounds based on seeding from regular season conference play. The defending champions were the Georgetown Hoyas and they successfully defended their title with a 3–0 victory over the Butler Bulldogs in the final. The conference tournament title was the second for the Georgetown women's soccer program, both of which have come under the direction of head coach Dave Nolan.

== Bracket ==
First round Sunday, Oct. 29
4	Marquette	3
5	Xavier	0
3	Providence	1 (4)
6	DePaul	1 (1)

Semifinals; Thursday, Nov. 2
1	Georgetown	4
4	Marquette	0
2	Butler	3
3	Providence	0

Final; Sunday, Nov. 5
1	Georgetown	3
2	Butler	0

== Schedule ==
=== Quarterfinals ===
October 29, 2017	#3 Providence	1–1 (a.e.t.) (4–1 p)	#6 DePaul	Providence, Rhode Island
2:00 p.m. EST	Hannah McNulty 78'	Report	90' Madeline Frick	Stadium: Chapey Field at Anderson Stadium; Attendance: 245; Referee: David Breckner; Assistant referees: Alp Gulden; Sam Mokalled; Fourth official: Michael Correia
	Penalties
	Katie Day (penalty scored); Kayla Steeves (penalty scored); Christina Rodgers (penalty scored); Hannah McNulty (penalty scored)		(penalty missed) Franny Cerny; (penalty scored) Madeline Frick; (penalty missed) Alexa Ben

October 29, 2017	#4 Marquette	3–0	#5 Xavier	Milwaukee, Wisconsin
7:00 p.m. EST	Kylie Sprecher 11'; Eli Beard 51', 71'	Report		Stadium: Valley Fields; Attendance: 242; Referee: Keith Angel; Assistant referees: Jamey Walter; Art Arustamyan; Fourth official: Kurt Stefan

=== Semifinals ===
November 2, 2017	#1 Georgetown	4–0	#4 Marquette	Washington, D.C.
2:00 p.m. EDT	Caitlin Farrell 10'; Rachel Corboz 14', 64'; Kelly Livingston 50'	Report		Stadium: Shaw Field; Attendance: 309; Referee: Shaun Papperman; Assistant referees: Jeffrey Gontarek; Jon DuBro; Fourth official: Thomas Goubeaux

November 2, 2017	#2 Butler	3–0	#3 Providence	Indianapolis, Indiana
7:00 p.m. EDT	Caitlyn Disarcina 5'; Julia Leonard 60'; Paige Monaghan 73'	Report		Stadium: Bud and Jackie Sellick Bowl; Attendance: 404; Referee: Leland Grant; Assistant referees: Jeff Swartzel; Brian Apwisch; Fourth official: David Jarze

=== Final ===
November 5, 2017	#1 Georgetown	3–0	#2 Butler	Washington, D.C.
1:30 p.m. EST	Taylor Pak 7'; Caitlin Farrell 51'; Rachel Corboz 88'	Report		Stadium: Shaw Field; Attendance: 595; Referee: David Breckner; Assistant referees: Randy Vonsteuben; Dan Richman; Fourth official: Thomas Goubeaux

== Statistics ==
=== Goalscorers ===
3 Goals

- Rachel Corboz - Georgetown

2 Goals

- Eli Beard - Marquette
- Caitlin Farrell - Georgetown

1 Goal

- Caitlyn Disarcina - Butler
- Madeline Frick - DePaul
- Julia Leonard - Butler
- Kelly Livingston - Georgetown
- Hannah McNulty - Providence
- Paige Monaghan - Butler
- Taylor Pak - Georgetown
- Kylie Sprecher - Marquette

== See also ==
- 2017 Big East Conference Men's Soccer Tournament
