= 2024 Big East Conference women's soccer tournament =

- Classification: Division I
- Teams: 6
- Matches: 5
- Attendance: 2,895
- Site: Maryland SoccerPlex (Semifinals and finals); Boyds, Maryland
- Champions: Connecticut (3rd title)
- Winning coach: Margaret Rodriguez (1st title)
- MVP: Lucy Cappadona (Defensive); Chioma Okafor (Offensive) (Connecticut)
- Broadcast: Big East Digital Network (quarterfinals and semifinals), Fox Sports 1 (Final)

2024 Big East Conference women's soccer standings
	Conf.						Overall
Team	W		L		T	PCT	W		L		T	PCT
Georgetown ‍†‍‍^{y}	8	–	1	–	1	.850	13	–	3	–	4	.750
Xavier ‍‍‍	7	–	2	–	1	.750	15	–	4	–	2	.762
Butler ‍‍‍	5	–	2	–	3	.650	10	–	4	–	5	.658
Creighton ‍‍‍	5	–	4	–	1	.550	8	–	7	–	2	.529
Connecticut ‍‍‡‍^{y}	4	–	3	–	3	.550	12	–	5	–	4	.667
DePaul ‍‍‍	3	–	3	–	4	.500	5	–	8	–	7	.425
Villanova ‍‍‍	2	–	3	–	5	.450	5	–	7	–	6	.444
Providence ‍‍‍	3	–	5	–	2	.400	6	–	9	–	3	.417
Marquette ‍‍‍	3	–	6	–	1	.350	6	–	11	–	3	.375
St. John's ‍‍‍	1	–	6	–	3	.250	6	–	7	–	5	.472
Seton Hall ‍‍‍	1	–	7	–	2	.200	4	–	12	–	3	.289
† – Conference champion ‡ – 2024 Big East Tournament champion y – Invited to the NCAA Tournament; As of December 10, 2024; Rankings from United Soccer Coaches Poll; Source:The Big East Conference

The 2024 Big East Conference women's soccer tournament was the postseason women's soccer tournament for the Big East Conference held from November 3 through November 10, 2024. The five-match tournament took place at the Maryland SoccerPlex in Boyds, Maryland for the semifinals and finals, while the first-round games were hosted by the higher seeded team. The six-team single-elimination tournament consisted of three rounds based on seeding from regular season conference play. The defending champions were the Georgetown Hoyas. They were unsuccessful in defending their title, as they fell to Connecticut in the Semifinals. Connecticut would go on to win the title by defeating Xavier 2–1, in overtime, in the Final. This was the third title in UConn's program history and first since 2004. It was the first title for head coach Margaret Rodriguez. As tournament champions, Connecticut earned the Big East's automatic berth into the 2024 NCAA Division I women's soccer tournament.

== Seeding ==
The top six teams in the regular season earned a spot in the tournament. Teams were seeded based on regular season conference records, and the first two teams earned byes into the semifinals. Seeds three and four hosted First Round matches. No tiebreakers were required as the top seven teams all finished with unique conference records.

Seed	School	Conference Record	Points
1	Georgetown	8–1–1	25
2	Xavier	7–2–1	22
3	Butler	5–2–3	18
4	Creighton	5–4–1	16
5	Connecticut	4–3–3	15
6	DePaul	3–3–4	13

== Bracket ==
First round Sunday, Nov. 3
4	Creighton	0
5	Connecticut	2
3	Butler	3 (7)
6	DePaul (pen.)	3 (8)

Semifinals; Thursday, Nov. 7
1	Georgetown	0
5	Connecticut	2
2	Xavier	2
6	DePaul	0

Final; Sunday, Nov. 10
5	Connecticut (a.e.t.)	2
2	Xavier	1

== Schedule ==
=== Quarterfinals ===
November 3, 2024	#3 Butler	3–3 (a.e.t.) (7–8 p)	#6 DePaul	Indianapolis, IN
1:00 p.m. EST	Caitlin O'Malley 59'; Leila Lister 68'; Talia Sommer 85'; Team (yellow card) 100', (yellow card) 100'	Report	35' Tessa Fagerson; 49' Freya Jupp; (yellow card) 64' Beth Smyth; (yellow card) 69' Katelyn Jamie; 71' Briley Hill	Stadium: Bud and Jackie Sellick Bowl; Attendance: 552; Referee: Calin Radosav; Assistant referees: Austin Finley; Doug Ferguson; Fourth official: Grace Barrett
	Penalties
	Talia Sommer (penalty scored); Abigail Isger (penalty scored); Sara Trandji (penalty scored); Anna Schroeder (penalty scored); Arianna Jalics (penalty scored); Lea Larouche (penalty scored); Daphne Murray (penalty scored); Lucia Englund (penalty missed)		(penalty scored) Nahla Dominguez; (penalty scored) Beth Smyth; (penalty scored) Lea Eisenring; (penalty scored) Freya Jupp; (penalty scored) Shayna da Silva; (penalty scored) Tessa Fagerson; (penalty scored) Natalie Moore; (penalty scored) Susie Soderstrom

November 3, 2024	#4 Creighton	0–2	#5 Connecticut	Omaha, NE
2:00 p.m. EST		Report	10' Lucy Cappadona; 39', (yellow card) 78' Chioma Okafor	Stadium: Morrison Stadium; Attendance: 872; Referee: Shane Butler; Assistant referees: Jacob Urban; Jacob Larson; Fourth official: Bobby Simetich

=== Semifinals ===
November 7, 2024	#2 Xavier	2–0	#6 DePaul	Boyds, MD
5:00 p.m. EST	Samantha Erbach 52'; Elin Hansson 53'; Samantha Wiehe (yellow card) 72'	Report	(yellow card) 78' Katelyn Jamie	Stadium: Maryland SoccerPlex; Attendance: 446; Referee: Marie Durr; Assistant referees: Conor McCloskey; Ryan Trombetta; Fourth official: Jeffrey Gontarek

November 7, 2024	#1 Georgetown	0–2	#5 Connecticut	Boyds, MD
7:30 p.m. EST	Team (yellow card) 57'	Report	27' Maddie Fried; 57' Lucy Cappadona	Stadium: Maryland SoccerPlex; Attendance: 504; Referee: JC Griggs; Assistant referees: Ryan Meyers; Matthew Richardson; Fourth official: Jeffrey Gontarek

=== Final ===
November 10, 2024	#2 Xavier	1–2 (a.e.t.)	#5 Connecticut	Boyds, MD
11:00 a.m. EST	Samantha Wiehe 21'; McKinley Berry (yellow card) 86'; Regan Dancer (yellow card) 105'	Report	51', (yellow card) 80' Laci Lewis; 109' Alayna Taylor	Stadium: Maryland SoccerPlex; Attendance: 521; Referee: Cedric Cook; Assistant referees: Sharon Gingrich; Alla Stepanov

== Statistics ==
=== Goalscorers ===
There were 15 goals scored in 5 matches, for an average of 3 goals per match (as of November 10, 2024).

2 goals

- Lucy Cappadona – Connecticut

1 goal

- Samantha Erbach – Xavier
- Tessa Fagerson – DePaul
- Maddie Fried – Connecticut
- Elin Hansson – Xavier
- Briley Hill – DePaul
- Freya Jupp – DePaul
- Leila Lister – Butler
- Laci Lewis – Connecticut
- Chioma Okafor – Connecticut
- Caitlin O'Malley – Butler
- Talia Sommer – Butler
- Alayna Taylor – Connecticut
- Samantha Wiehe – Xavier

== All-Tournament team ==
Player	Team
Lucy Cappadona^	Connecticut
Maddie Fried	Connecticut
Anaya Johnson	Connecticut
Sophie McCarthy	Connecticut
Chioma Okafor*	Connecticut
Alayna Taylor	Connecticut
Briley Hill	DePaul
Elena Milam	DePaul
Lizzie Heller	Georgetown
Lawson Renie	Georgetown
Natalie Bain	Xavier
Zoe van de Cloot	Xavier
Samantha Wiehe	Xavier

* Offensive MVP
^ Defensive MVP
