= 2018 Big East Conference women's soccer tournament =

Postseason women's soccer tournament

- Classification: Division I
- Teams: 6
- Matches: 5
- Attendance: 3,287
- Site: Campus sites
- Champions: Georgetown (3rd title)
- Winning coach: Dave Nolan (3rd title)
- MVP: Caitlin Farrell (Offensive); Kelly Ann Livingstone (Defensive) (Georgetown)
- Broadcast: Big East Network (Quarterfinals and Semifinals), Fox Sports 1 (Final)

2018 Big East Conference women's soccer standings
	Conf.						Overall
Team	W		L		T	PCT	W		L		T	PCT
No. 2 Georgetown ‍†‍‡‍^{y}	8	–	0	–	1	.944	17	–	0	–	3	.925
Butler ‍‍‍	6	–	2	–	1	.722	13	–	6	–	1	.675
St. John's ‍‍‍	5	–	3	–	1	.611	9	–	9	–	1	.500
Xavier ‍‍‍	4	–	3	–	2	.556	10	–	8	–	3	.548
DePaul ‍‍‍	4	–	3	–	2	.556	8	–	6	–	5	.553
Providence ‍‍‍	4	–	3	–	2	.556	11	–	6	–	3	.625
Creighton ‍‍‍	3	–	5	–	1	.389	6	–	10	–	1	.382
Villanova ‍‍‍	3	–	6	–	0	.333	9	–	9	–	0	.500
Marquette ‍‍‍	2	–	5	–	2	.333	4	–	11	–	3	.306
Seton Hall ‍‍‍	0	–	9	–	0	.000	2	–	12	–	4	.222
† – Conference champion ‡ – 2018 Big East Tournament champion y – Invited to the NCAA tournament As of November 1, 2018; Rankings from United Soccer Coaches Poll; Source:The Big East Conference

The 2018 Big East Conference women's soccer tournament was the postseason women's soccer tournament for the Big East Conference held from October 28 through November 4, 2018. The five-match tournament took place at campus sites, with the higher seed hosting each game. The six-team single-elimination tournament consisted of three rounds based on seeding from regular season conference play. The defending champions were the Georgetown Hoyas. They were the top seed based on an 8–0–1 season in conference play. The Hoyas were able to defend their crown, beating Butler in the final. This marks the third year in a row Georgetown has won the tournament.

== Bracket ==
First round Sunday, Oct. 28
4	Xavier	1 (4)
5	DePaul	1 (2)
3	St. John's	0
6	Providence	1

Semifinals; Thursday, Nov. 1
1	Georgetown	3
4	Xavier	1
2	Butler	3
6	Providence	2

Final; Sunday, Nov. 4
1	Georgetown	1
2	Butler	0

== Schedule ==
=== Quarterfinals ===
October 28, 2018	#3 St. John's	0–1	#6 Providence	Queens, NY
1:00 p.m. EST		Report	Amber Birchwell 30'; Katie Day (yellow card) 31'	Stadium: Belson Stadium; Attendance: 396; Referee: Dimtar Chavadarov; Assistant referees: Nate Penn; Christian Centeno; Fourth official: Michael Ziegler

October 28, 2018	#4 Xavier	1–1 (a.e.t.) (4–2 p)	#5 DePaul	Cincinnati, OH
4:00 p.m. EST	Samantha Dewey 63' (yellow card) 86'	Report	Madeline Frick (yellow card) 18'; Franny Cerny (yellow card) 70'; Avery Hay 74'	Stadium: XU Soccer Complex; Attendance: 433; Referee: Mike DeFelice; Assistant referees: Tony Crush; Britton Maier; Fourth official: Mikael Lundqvist
	Penalties
	Grace Bahr (penalty scored); Molly McLaughlin (penalty scored); Rachel Butler (penalty scored); Claire Fisher (penalty scored)		Franny Cerny (penalty missed); Madeline Frick (penalty scored); Mikaela Hoard (penalty missed); Jade Eriksen-Russo (penalty scored)

=== Semifinals ===
November 1, 2018	#1 Georgetown	3–1	#4 Xavier	Washington, D.C.
1:30 p.m. EDT	Carson Nizialek 42' (pen.); Caitlin Farrell 51'; Amanda Carolan 83'	Report	Grace Bahr (yellow card) 52'; Andie Kennard 83'	Stadium: Shaw Field; Attendance: 757; Referee: Nick Balcer; Assistant referees: Jason Gordon; Will Aten; Fourth official: Evan Horne

November 1, 2018	#2 Butler	3–2	#6 Providence	Indianapolis, Indiana
7:00 p.m. EDT	Halle Stelbasky 18', 87'; Annika Schmidt 34'	Report	Camille Murphy 79'; Amber Birchwell 87'	Stadium: Bud and Jackie Sellick Bowl; Attendance: 304; Referee: Michael McBride; Assistant referees: Khary Williams; DeLois Williams; Fourth official: Jeff Swartzel

=== Final ===
November 4, 2018	#1 Georgetown	1–0	#2 Butler	Washington, D.C.
1:00 p.m. EST	Caitlin Farrell 2'	Report	Morgan Kloosterman (yellow card) 64'	Stadium: Shaw Field; Attendance: 1,097; Referee: Anthony Russo; Assistant referees: Ian Gut; James Sadowski; Fourth official: Andrew Smith

== Statistics ==
=== Goalscorers ===
2 Goals

- Amber Birchwell – Providence
- Caitlin Farrell – Georgetown
- Halle Stelbasky – Butler

1 Goal

- Amanda Carolan – Georgetown
- Samantha Dewey – Xavier
- Avery Hay – DePaul
- Andi Kennard – Xavier
- Camille Murphy – Providence
- Carson Nizialek – Georgetown
- Annika Schmidt – Butler

== All-Tournament team ==
Player	Team
Caitlin Farrell	Georgetown
Kelly Ann Livingstone	Georgetown
Carson Nizialek	Georgetown
Kyra Carusa	Georgetown
Amber Birchwell	Providence
Shelby Hogan	Providence
Samantha Dewey	Xavier
Andie Kennard	Xavier
Paige Monaghan	Butler
Halle Stelbasky	Butler
Annika Schmidt	Butler
