= 2021 Big East Conference women's soccer tournament =

- Classification: Division I
- Teams: 6
- Matches: 5
- Attendance: 2,126
- Site: Corcoran Field (Semifinals and Finals); Cincinnati, Ohio
- Champions: Georgetown (5th title)
- Winning coach: Dave Nolan (5th title)
- MVP: Sydney Cummings (Offensive); Julia Leas (Defensive) (Georgetown)
- Broadcast: Big East Network (Quarterfinals and Semifinals), Fox Sports 1 (Final)

2021 Big East Conference women's soccer standings
	Conf.						Overall
Team	W		L		T	PCT	W		L		T	PCT
No. 19 Xavier ‍†‍‍^{y}	9	–	1	–	0	.900	16	–	3	–	1	.825
No. 22 Georgetown ‍‍‡‍^{y}	7	–	1	–	2	.800	14	–	2	–	6	.773
Butler ‍‍‍^{y}	7	–	2	–	1	.750	15	–	5	–	1	.738
St. John's ‍‍‍^{y}	6	–	3	–	1	.650	13	–	7	–	3	.630
Providence ‍‍‍^{y}	5	–	3	–	2	.600	10	–	7	–	3	.575
UConn ‍‍‍	5	–	4	–	1	.550	9	–	8	–	1	.528
Marquette ‍‍‍	5	–	5	–	0	.500	9	–	8	–	0	.529
DePaul ‍‍‍	4	–	6	–	0	.400	7	–	11	–	0	.389
Creighton ‍‍‍	1	–	8	–	1	.150	7	–	10	–	2	.421
Villanova ‍‍‍	1	–	9	–	0	.100	7	–	11	–	0	.389
Seton Hall ‍‍‍	1	–	9	–	0	.100	6	–	12	–	0	.333
† – Conference champion ‡ – 2021 Big East Tournament champion y – Invited to the NCAA tournament As of December 7, 2021; Rankings from United Soccer Coaches Poll; Source:The Big East Conference

The 2021 Big East Conference women's soccer tournament was the postseason women's soccer tournament for the Big East Conference held from October 31 through November 7, 2021. The five-match tournament took place at Xavier University's Corcoran Field in Cincinnati, Ohio for the Semifinals and Finals, while the Quarterfinals were hosted by the higher seeded team. The six-team single-elimination tournament consisted of three rounds based on seeding from regular season conference play. The defending champions were the Georgetown Hoyas. They successfully defended their title by defeating St. John's in the final 1–0. This is the fifth title in program history for Georgetown and head coach Dave Nolan. All five of their titles have come in the last six years. As tournament champions, Georgetown earned the Big East's automatic berth into the 2021 NCAA Division I Women's Soccer Tournament.

== Seeding ==
The top six teams in the regular season earned a spot in the tournament. No tiebreakers were required as each of the top six teams finished with unique point totals. The Semifinals and Finals of the tournament were hosted by the first seed, Xavier.

Seed	School	Conference Record	Points
1	Xavier	9–1–0	27
2	Georgetown	7–1–2	23
3	Butler	7–2–1	22
4	St. John's	6–3–1	19
5	Providence	5–3–2	17
6	UConn	5–4–1	16

== Bracket ==
First round Sunday, Oct. 31
4	St. John's (a.e.t.)	2
5	Providence	1
3	Butler (a.e.t.)	1
6	UConn	0

Semifinals; Thursday, Nov. 4
1	Xavier	0
4	St. John's	1
2	Georgetown	2
3	Butler	1

Final; Sunday, Nov. 7
4	St. John's	0
2	Georgetown	1

== Schedule ==
=== Quarterfinals ===
October 31, 2021	#3 Butler	1–0 (a.e.t.)	#6 UConn	Indianapolis, IN
1:00 p.m. EST	Abigail Isger 107'	Report	(yellow card) 43' Isabelle Lynch	Stadium: Sellick Bowl; Attendance: 292; Referee: Mark Buda; Assistant referees: Aaron Rawlins; Jason Gordon; Fourth official: Anthony Frizzell

October 31, 2021	#4 St. John's	2–1 (a.e.t.)	#5 Providence	New York, NY
1:00 p.m. EST	Frederique St. Jean 31'; Nicole Gordon (yellow card) 76'; Maia Cabrera (yellow card) 90'; Isabelle Aviza 91'	Report	(yellow card) 27', (goal) 79' Amber Birchwell	Stadium: Belson Stadium; Attendance: 334; Referee: Stephen Foster; Assistant referees: Rob Fereday; Keith Fisher; Fourth official: Alexandru Focea

=== Semifinals ===
November 4, 2021	#1 Xavier	0–1	#4 St. John's	Cincinnati, OH
5:00 p.m. EST		Report	(yellow card) 57' Nicole Gordon; 61' Zsanett Kaján	Stadium: Corcoran Field; Attendance: 663; Referee: Richonne Clark; Assistant referees: Maggie Short; Chad Collins; Fourth official: Cole Druck

November 4, 2021	#2 Georgetown	2–1	#3 Butler	Cincinnati, OH
7:30 p.m. EST	Eliza Turner 60'; Kaitlyn Parcell 66'	Report	82' Katie Soderstrom	Stadium: Corcoran Field; Attendance: 663; Referee: David Breckner; Assistant referees: Michael Kinder; Dean Morgan; Fourth official: Mikael Lundqvist

=== Final ===
November 7, 2021	#2 Georgetown	1–0	#4 St. John's	Cincinnati, OH
1:30 p.m. EST	Sydney Cummings 64'	Report	(yellow card) 72' Angelina Scoma; (yellow card) 78' Athina Sofroniou	Stadium: Corcoran Field; Attendance: 174; Referee: Karl Kummer; Assistant referees: Kyle Maust; Andrew Castel; Fourth official: Michael Samour

== Statistics ==
=== Goalscorers ===
There were 9 goals scored in 5 matches, for an average of 1.8 goals per match (as of November 7, 2021).

1 goal

- Abigail Isger – Butler
- Katie Soderstrom – Butler
- Sydney Cummings – Georgetown
- Kaitlyn Parcell – Georgetown
- Eliza Turner – Georgetown
- Amber Birchwell – Providence
- Isabelle Aviza – St. John's
- Zsanett Kaján – St. John's
- Frederique St. Jean – St. John's

== All-Tournament team ==
Player	Team
Julia Leas^	Georgetown
Sydney Cummings*	Georgetown
Maya Fernandez-Powell	Georgetown
Kelly Ann Livingstone	Georgetown
Shannon Aviza	St. John's
Michell Money	St. John's
Katherine Turner	St. John's
Molly McLaughlin	Xavier
Sonia Vargas	Xavier
Abby Isger	Butler
Katie Soderstrom	Butler

* Offensive MVP
^ Defensive MVP
