= Samantha Erbach =

American soccer player (born 2005)

- Erbach with Florida State in 2026

Personal information
- Place of birth: 2005 (age 20–21)
- Height: 5 ft 7 in (1.70 m)
- Positions: Forward; midfielder

Team information
- Current team: Florida State Seminoles

Youth career
- Ohio Elite SA

College career
Years	Team	Apps	(Gls)
2024–2025	Xavier Musketeers	43	(29)
2026–	Florida State Seminoles	10	(4)

Samantha Erbach (born 2005) is an American college soccer player who plays as a midfielder or forward for the Florida State Seminoles. She previously played for the Xavier Musketeers, where she also ran track.

== Early life ==
Erbach grew up in Lebanon, Ohio, one of four children born to Jeremy and Kristen Erbach. She attended Waynesville High School, where she was a standout in soccer, cross country, and track, earning first-team all-state honors in all three sports. She led the soccer team to their first OHSAA DIII state championship as a sophomore in 2021, before finishing as state runner-up in 2022. She set the program scoring record with 152 career goals to go with 66 assists and was named United Soccer Coaches All-American and the Southwest Ohio Player of the Year. She played club soccer for Ohio Elite, where she was named ECNL All-American and ECNL Conference Player of the Year. She committed to play college soccer for the Xavier Musketeers before her junior year.

== College career ==
Erbach started all 21 games for the Xavier Musketeers as a freshman in 2024, leading the team with 11 goals and adding 5 assists. She led the team to finish runner-up for the Big East Conference regular-season and tournament titles and was named first-team All-Big East and the Big East Freshman of the Year. After the soccer season, she competed for Xavier's track and field team at the 800- and 1,500-meter distances. Having played striker the previous year, she moved to attacking midfielder for her sophomore season in 2025. She had a breakout sophomore campaign and led the nation in points with 18 goals and 16 assists in 22 games, powering the second-highest-scoring offense after national finalists Stanford. She led the Musketeers to victory in the Big East tournament, scoring four goals and being named the tournament's Offensive MVP. She ended the season as the Big East Midfielder of the Year, first-team All-Big East, and third-team All-American. After two years at Xavier, she transferred to the defending national champion Florida State Seminoles in the spring of 2026.

== Honors and awards ==
Xavier Musketeers

- Big East Conference women's soccer tournament: 2025

Individual

- Third-team All-American: 2025
- Big East Midfielder of the Year: 2025
- Big East Freshman of the Year: 2024
- First-team All-Big East: 2024, 2025
- Big East tournament Offensive MVP: 2025
