= Natalie Hammond (soccer) =

American soccer player (born 2003)

- Hammond with the Houston Dash in 2026

Personal information
- Full name: Natalie Bain Hammond
- Birth name: Natalie Marceline Bain
- Date of birth: December 29, 2003 (age 22)
- Height: 5 ft 10 in (1.78 m)
- Position: Center back

Team information
- Current team: Houston Dash
- Number: 8

Youth career
- Kings Hammer
- 2018–2021: Notre Dame Academy Pandas

College career
Years	Team	Apps	(Gls)
2022–2025	Xavier Musketeers	85	(9)

Senior career*
Years	Team	Apps	(Gls)
2022–2025	Kings Hammer	22	(2)
2026–	Houston Dash	9	(0)
- * Club domestic league appearances and goals as of 03:10, November 8, 2026 (UTC)

Natalie Bain Hammond (née Bain; born December 29, 2003) is an American professional soccer player who plays as a center back for the Houston Dash of the National Women's Soccer League (NWSL). She played college soccer for the Xavier Musketeers, earning All-American honors three times. She was named the USA Today national high school player of the year in 2022.

== Early life ==
Hammond grew up in Alexandria, Kentucky. She attended Notre Dame Academy in Park Hills, Kentucky, where she played for the soccer team for four seasons. In her senior year in 2021, she led Notre Dame Academy to a 28–0–1 record and the KHSAA state championship, allowing just four goals all season and scoring the lone goal in the state final. She was named MVP of the district, regional, and state tournaments; a United Soccer Coaches high school All-American; and the USA Today High School Player of the Year. She played club soccer for Kings Hammer Academy, earning ECNL all-conference honors.

== College career ==
Hammond started all 23 games for the Xavier Musketeers as a freshman in 2022, contributing to 11 shutouts. In the NCAA tournament, she had an assist in the first round win over Tennessee. She was named second-team All-Big East and named to the Big East all-freshman team. In 2023, she helped the team match a program record 13 shutouts in 20 games as a sophomore, winning a share of the Big East regular-season title and earning a program best four seed in the NCAA tournament. She was named first-team All-Big East and second-team All-American.

Hammond scored a career-high 3 goals and helped record 10 shutouts in 21 games as a junior in 2024. She helped the Musketeers to their third consecutive Big East tournament title game, though they lost all three. She was named first-team All-Big East, the Big East Defensive Player of the Year, and second-team All-American, becoming the first multiple-time All-American in program history. In her senior year in 2025, she started 21 games and again scored 3 goals while helping post 12 shutouts. Voted team captain, she led Xavier finally over the hump in the Big East tournament, winning the second tournament title in program history. She was named first-team All-Big East for the third time, Big East Defensive Player of the Year for the second time, and fourth-team All-American, becoming the first three-time All-American in program history. The Cincinnati Enquirer called her "arguably the most decorated player in Xavier women's soccer history".

== Club career ==
Hammond joined the Houston Dash as a non-roster invitee in the preseason in January 2026. On April 10, the Dash announced they had signed Hammond to her first professional contract on a one-year deal, and she would rejoin the club after finishing college the following month. She made her professional debut on August 8, coming on as a second-half substitute in a 1–1 draw with the Kansas City Current. She made her first professional start ten days later against the Chicago Stars, playing the full 90 minutes in a club-record-equaling 5–0 victory. On October 21, she signed a new two-year contract with the Dash through 2028.

== International career ==
Hammond received her first international call-up with the United States under-23 team, training concurrently with the senior national team, in October 2025.

== Personal life ==
Hammond is the daughter of Aly and Thomas Bain and has two siblings. She married Luke Hammond in July 2026.

== Honors and awards ==
Xavier Musketeers

- Big East Conference: 2023
- Big East Conference tournament: 2025

Individual

- Second-team All-American: 2023, 2024
- Fourth-team All-American: 2025
- Big East Defensive Player of the Year: 2024, 2025
- First-team All-Big East: 2023, 2024, 2025
- Second-team All-Big East: 2022
- Big East all-freshman team: 2022
