= Caitlin Farrell =

Former American soccer player

Personal information
- Full name: Caitlin Peel Farrell
- Date of birth: September 29, 1997 (age 29)
- Place of birth: New Haven, Connecticut
- Height: 5 ft 10 in (1.78 m)
- Position: Forward

Youth career
- Connecticut FC ECNL

College career
Years	Team	Apps	(Gls)
2015–2018	Georgetown Hoyas	92	(30)

Senior career*
Years	Team	Apps	(Gls)
2019	Orlando Pride	3	(0)

International career
2018	United States U-23		
- * Club domestic league appearances and goals as of June 15, 2019

Caitlin Peel Farrell (born September 29, 1997) is an American former soccer player who played professionally as a forward for Orlando Pride in the NWSL.

== Early life ==
Farrell was a three-sport athlete at Choate Rosemary Hall, playing soccer, basketball and lacrosse. An All-America selection by the National Soccer Coaches Association of America (NSCAA) in 2014, she was selected to play in the high school All-America game. She also played club soccer with Connecticut FC ECNL and the Region I Olympic Development Program.

=== Georgetown Hoyas ===
Farrell played collegiate soccer at Georgetown University where she won three consecutive Big East Conference titles and made two appearances at the NCAA Women's College Cup finals in 2016 and 2018. In her senior year, Farrell was third in the nation for goals with a career-high 18, unanimously named Big East Offensive Player of the Year and was nominated as a MAC Hermann Trophy finalist alongside Jordan DiBiasi and Catarina Macario. In total, Farrell appeared in all 92 of Georgetown's games (75 starts) scoring 30 goals and 19 assists.

== Professional career ==
=== Orlando Pride ===
Despite registering for the 2019 NWSL College Draft, Farrell was not selected to the surprise of many analysts. In March she joined Orlando Pride's preseason camp as a non-roster invitee and was signed to the team's supplemental roster on April 10. After finishing school during the early part of the season, she made her professional debut on May 25, 2019, as a substitute away at Utah Royals FC. In doing so she became the youngest Pride player to date, beating Erin Greening's record set earlier in the season by 60 days. Farrell finished her debut season with three appearances for a combined 15 minutes. Having not joined the Pride in 2020 preseason, Farrell was officially removed from the roster ahead of the Fall Series in September for failure to report. She had been working as a paralegal since June.

== Career statistics ==
As of June 15, 2019

Club	Season	League			Cup		Continental		Total	
Club	Season	League	Apps	Goals	Apps	Goals	Apps	Goals	Apps	Goals
Orlando Pride	2019	NWSL	3	0	—		—		3	0
Career total			3	0	0	0	0	0	3	0

== Honors ==
Georgetown Hoyas

- Big East Conference Women's Soccer Tournament: 2016, 2017, 2018

Individual

- Big East Conference Offensive Player of the Year: 2018
- United Soccer Coaches First Team All-America: 2018
- MAC Hermann Trophy Finalist: 2018
