= Jessica Garziano =

American soccer player (born 2001)

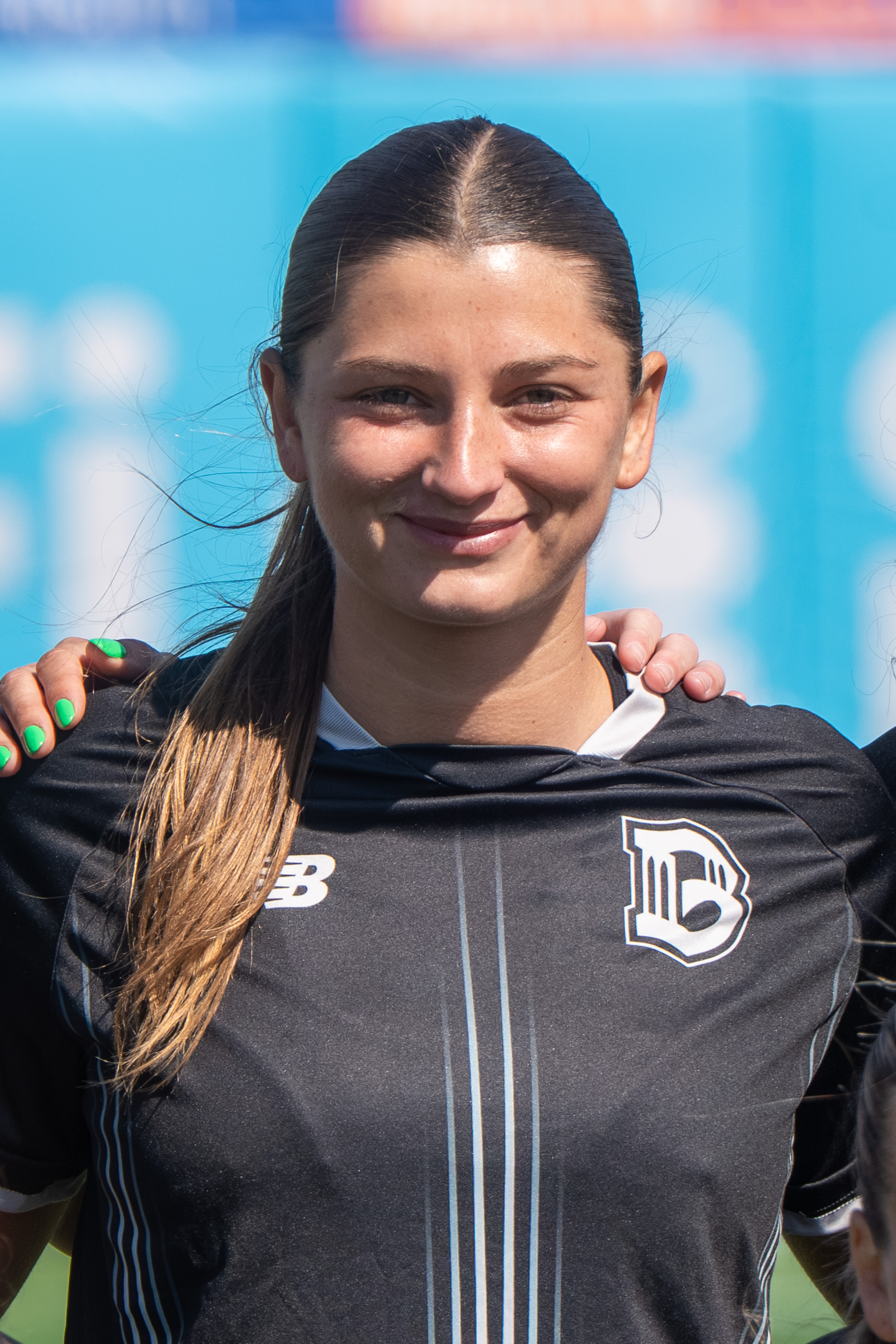
- Garziano with Brooklyn FC in 2026

Personal information
- Date of birth: March 19, 2001 (age 25)
- Place of birth: Melville, New York, U.S.
- Height: 5 ft 7 in (1.70 m)
- Position: Forward

Team information
- Current team: Brooklyn FC
- Number: 9

Youth career
- SUSA Academy

College career
Years	Team	Apps	(Gls)
2019–2023	St. John's Red Storm	90	(22)

Senior career*
Years	Team	Apps	(Gls)
2023–2024	Long Island Rough Riders	16	(13)
2024–	Brooklyn FC	55	(6)
- * Club domestic league appearances and goals as of 20:12, May 17, 2026 (UTC)

Jessica Garziano (born March 19, 2001) is an American professional soccer player who plays as a forward for Brooklyn FC of the USL Super League. She played college soccer for the St. John's Red Storm.

== Early life ==
Garziano was raised in the Long Island hamlet of Melville, New York. She attended Half Hollow Hills East and was named to New York all-state teams in 2017 in 2018. She played three seasons of ECNL club soccer for SUSA Academy.

== College career ==
Garziano played five seasons as a midfielder, wearing number 12 for the St. John's Red Storm. She was her team's top assist provider with five in her freshman season in 2019. She ranked third in the Big East Conference with seven goals in twelve games in the spring of 2020–21, earning first-team All-Big East honors. She scored once and added ten assists in the fall of 2021, helping St. John's reach the final of the conference tournament, and converted in a penalty shootout to help reach the third round of the NCAA tournament for the first time in program history. She continued to lead St. John's offense in 2022, with team highs of four goals and five assists.

Garziano's production more than doubled in her final college season in 2023, when she scored ten goals (second in the conference) and added eleven assists (first), contributing directly to almost two-thirds of her team's scoring. She was voted the Big East midfielder of the year, second-team United Soccer Coaches All-American, and first-team All-Big East, her fourth conference selection overall. She left St. John's as the all-time assist leader (34).

== Club career ==
=== Long Island Rough Riders ===
Garziano played two seasons for the Long Island Rough Riders of the pre-professional USL W League. She helped lead the team to second place in its division in 2023 and first place in 2024.

=== Brooklyn FC ===
After college, Garziano was drafted 44th overall by Angel City FC in the fourth round of the 2024 NWSL Draft but was not signed by the team. She instead signed with USL Super League club Brooklyn FC on June 24, 2024, ahead of the league's inaugural 2024–25 season. On September 8, in Brooklyn's first game, she scored the club's first-ever goal with the help of a penalty in a 1–1 draw at Spokane Zephyr FC. She opened in a 2–0 win over Dallas Trinity FC in Brooklyn's first home match on September 25. For her performance, she was named the league's Player of the Month for September.

== Career statistics ==
=== College ===
College	Regular Season				Big East Tournament		NCAA Tournament		Total	
College	Conference	Season	Apps	Goals	Apps	Goals	Apps	Goals	Apps	Goals
St. John's Red Storm	Big East	2019	18	0	–		–		18	0
St. John's Red Storm	Big East	2020–21	12	7	–		–		12	7
St. John's Red Storm	Big East	2021	16	1	3	0	3	0	22	1
St. John's Red Storm	Big East	2022	17	3	2	1	–		19	4
St. John's Red Storm	Big East	2023	18	9	1	1	–		19	10
Career total			81	20	6	2	3	0	90	22

=== Club ===
As of January 25, 2025

Club	Season	League			League Cup		Total	
Club	Season	Division	Apps	Goals	Apps	Goals	Apps	Goals
Brooklyn FC	2024–25	USL Super League	13	4	0	0	13	4
Career total			13	4	0	0	13	4
