= Panzerkampfwagen Bär =

The Panzerkampfwagen Bär, or Bär, was a German military design for a self-propelled gun, devised in WW2.

After the battle of Stalingrad the German army's interest in developing a heavily armored assault vehicle capable of demolishing well-fortified structures continued into 1943. That year, the manufacturing firm Krupp proposed a design that called for a 30.5 cm L/16 siege mortar along with the running gear from a Tiger II. The 120-ton Bär (“bear” in English) never existed beyond blueprints.

== Development ==
The Bär was only designed on paper and did not reach prototype stage. The concept was to make a formidable Assault gun/or self-propelled gun. Its specifications were very much like that of the Sturmtiger, so it may have been used in that role. The running gear was to be taken from the Tiger tank, but rather than using torsion bar for suspension, it would have used leaf springs. The gun was very large, so it had limited or no traverse, however, it could elevate.

== Specifications ==
The vehicle was heavy, weighing up to 120 tons. Overall length was 8.2 metres. The crew consisted of 6 men. The main gun was large, a 30.5 cm calibre H. L/16.

== Bibliography ==
- Jentz, Tom; Doyle, Hilary (2001). Panzer Tracts No.20-1: Paper Panzers – Panzerkampfwagen, Sturmgeschuetz and Jagdpanzer. Boyds. ISBN 978-1-915969-04-0.
