= Chioma Okafor (footballer) =

Nigerian footballer (born 2003)

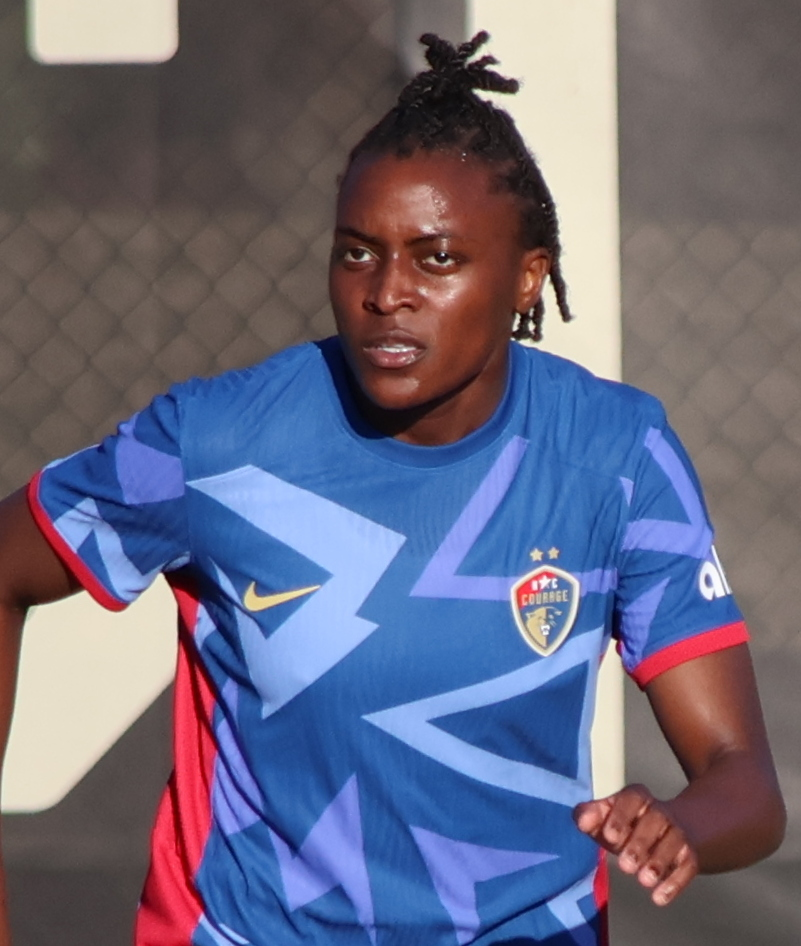
- Okafor with the North Carolina Courage in 2026

Personal information
- Date of birth: 20 March 2003 (age 23)
- Place of birth: Blantyre, Malawi
- Height: 1.65 m (5 ft 5 in)
- Position: Forward

Team information
- Current team: North Carolina Courage
- Number: 8

College career
Years	Team	Apps	(Gls)
2022–2025	UConn Huskies	57	(30)

Senior career*
Years	Team	Apps	(Gls)
2026–	North Carolina Courage	18	(1)

International career^{‡}
2024–2025	Nigeria		
- * Club domestic league appearances and goals as of 06:55, 8 November 2026 (UTC) ‡ National team caps and goals as of 14 August 2025

Chioma Okafor OON (born 20 March 2003) is a professional footballer who plays as a forward for the North Carolina Courage of the National Women's Soccer League (NWSL). Born in Malawi, she plays for the Nigeria national team. She played college soccer for the UConn Huskies, earning All-American honors three times.

== Early life ==
Okafor was born in Malawi to a Nigerian father and a Malawian mother.

== College career ==
Okafor joined the women's soccer team at the University of Connecticut in 2022, after graduating from the Berkshire School in Sheffield, Massachusetts. She was a Hermann Trophy semifinalist in 2024 and was named to the prestigious trophy's watchlist in August 2025 ahead of her senior season.

== Club career ==
On 10 December 2025, the North Carolina Courage announced that they had signed Okafor to a three-year contract through 2028, with the club option to extend another year.

== International career ==
Okafor was part of the Nigerian women national team squad that won the 2025 Women's Africa Cup of Nations and was awarded the national honour Officer of the Order of the Niger (OON), a hundred thousand dollars and a three-bedroom apartment at the Renewed Hope Estate in Abuja.

== Honours ==
UConn Huskies

- Big East Conference women's soccer tournament: 2024

Nigeria

- Women's Africa Cup of Nations: 2024

Individual

- Third-team All-American: 2023, 2024, 2025
- First-team All-Big East: 2023, 2024, 2025
- Second-team All-Big East: 2022
- Big East tournament Offensive MVP: 2024

Orders

- Officer of the Order of the Niger
