= Len Tsantiris =

Music

Biographical details
- Born: c. 1954 (age 71–72); Greece

Playing career
- 1973–1976: Connecticut

Coaching career (HC unless noted)
- 1981–2017: Connecticut

Head coaching record
- Overall: 570–201–59

Accomplishments and honors

Championships
- 4x Conference tournament championships (2002, 2004,2014,2016); 9x Conference regular season championships (1995, 1998, 1999, 2000, 2001, 2002, 2003, 2005, 2016)

Awards
- NSCAA Division I National (1997); Division I Northeast Coach of the Year (1983, 1987, 1995, 1996); Conference Coach of the Year(1995,1998,2015,2016)

Len Tsantiris is an American college soccer coach, who served as head coach of the Connecticut Huskies women's soccer team from 1981 through 2017. Tsantiris is second all-time on the career wins list for women's soccer coaches, with 570 victories.

== Playing career ==
Tsantiris earned four varsity letters in soccer for the Connecticut Huskies men's soccer team, earning All-New England and All-Yankee Conference honors. The Huskies qualified for three NCAA tournaments in his four seasons, reaching the quarterfinals in 1971 and 1974 and the final sixteen in 1975.

== Coaching career ==
Tsantiris became head coach of the UConn Women's soccer team in 1981. From 1982-2007 he led the team to 26 consecutive NCAA tournament appearance and 31 appearances over the course of his coaching career. He announced his retirement after the team's 2017 season after 37 seasons as head coach and 570 wins, behind only Anson Dorrance all time.
