= Kelly Ann Livingstone =

American soccer player (born 1998)

Personal information
- Date of birth: November 24, 1998 (age 27)
- Place of birth: Montclair, New Jersey, U.S.
- Height: 5 ft 10 in (1.78 m)
- Position: Center back

Youth career
- Match Fit Academy

College career
Years	Team	Apps	(Gls)
2017–2021	Georgetown Hoyas	98	(12)

Senior career*
Years	Team	Apps	(Gls)
2021	NJ/NY Gotham Reserves		
2022	NJ/NY Gotham FC	0	(0)
2023	Fortuna Hjørring	13	(0)
2023	OL Reign	0	(0)
2024	Carolina Ascent	0	(0)
- * Club domestic league appearances and goals as of 06:42, January 25, 2026 (UTC)

Kelly Ann Livingstone (born November 24, 1998) is an American professional soccer player who plays as a center back. She played college soccer for the Georgetown Hoyas, earning second-team All-American honors as a senior, before being selected in the 2022 NWSL Draft by NJ/NY Gotham FC.

== Early life ==
Born in Montclair, New Jersey, to Glenn and Cathy Livingstone, Livingstone grew up in the neighboring town of Glen Ridge. She played youth soccer for Match Fit Academy, where she contributed to one ECNL finals appearance and received a call-up to the ECNL National Team ID camp in 2015. Livingstone attended Glen Ridge High School, winning a New Jersey state championship title in 2013.

== College career ==
As a freshman for the Georgetown Hoyas, Livingstone started 20 matches and contributed to 17 shutouts. In August 2017, she was named Big East Defensive Player of the Week after limiting opposition to only four shots across two games. At the end of the season, she helped Georgetown win the Big East Conference tournament for the second year in a row, scoring her first college goal in the competition semifinals despite picking up an injury in the play. She was named to the Big East all-freshman team at the end of the year.

Livingstone contributed to three more Big East tournament titles in her remaining four seasons at Georgetown. As a sophomore, she was the tournament's Defensive MVP and received a berth on the all-tournament team. In her junior year, she scored in the Big East semifinals once again en route to a loss to Xavier in the final.

Livingstone reached her greatest heights in her senior season, winning honors as the Big East Defender of the Year and earning spots on the All-East region team and the All Big-East First Team. She was a second-team All-American, her first national honor. In the 2020 NCAA tournament, Livingstone guided Georgetown to the third round before they were eliminated on penalties by TCU; she was one of two Hoyas to have their spot-kicks saved by Emily Alvarado. Livingstone played one more season for Georgetown as a graduate student before departing from the program.

== Club career ==
=== NJ/NY Gotham FC ===
NJ/NY Gotham FC selected Livingstone as the 24th overall pick of the 2022 NWSL Draft. Livingstone already had ties to Gotham, having attended the team's games as a child (under Sky Blue FC) and having previously played for Gotham's pre-professional WPSL reserve team in the summer of 2021. On March 23, 2022, she signed her first professional contract with Gotham, a one-year deal with an option for a second. She made her professional debut on April 17, coming on as a late-game substitute for Estelle Johnson in an NWSL Challenge Cup match against the Washington Spirit.

Livingstone did not make any further competitive appearances for the team before being waived in February 2023. It had initially appeared unclear whether or not new head coach Juan Carlos Amorós would end up keeping or getting rid of Livingstone, but he eventually decided to waive her just prior to the 2023 preseason in hopes of freeing up more roster space.

=== Fortuna Hjørring ===
On February 17, 2023, Livingstone signed for Danish club Fortuna Hjørring. Having been in between agents after leaving Gotham, she handled much of the move's logistics by herself. Livingstone was soon joined by fellow United States citizens Janae Packard and future Carolina Ascent teammate Renée Guion, creating a strong American contingent in Fortuna. She ended up starting all 13 of the club's games to round out the season, combining with her teammates to produce 5 wins and 3 clean sheets. Despite enjoying her experience abroad, Livingstone opted to return stateside after four months in Denmark, partially due to homesickness.

=== OL Reign and Carolina Ascent ===
Livingstone signed a short-term national team replacement player contract with the OL Reign on June 26, 2023, filling in some of the Reign's roster absences caused by the absences of 2023 FIFA Women's World Cup participants. After not making any appearances for the Reign, Livingstone entered discussions with Carolina Ascent FC, which was preparing for its inaugural season of play in the USL Super League. She was quickly convinced to join the team following conversations with head coach Philip Poole and signed a contract for the club on May 14, 2024. However, she did not make any appearances as the Ascent capped off its first season as league shield winners.

== Honors and awards ==
Georgetown Hoyas

- Big East tournament: 2017, 2018, 2020, 2021

Individual

- Second-team All-America: 2020
- First-team All-Big East: 2020
- Big East all-freshman team: 2017
- Big East Defensive Player of the Year: 2018
- Big East tournament all-tournament team: 2018
