= Margaret Rodriguez =

American retired soccer player

Personal information
- Birth name: Margaret Tietjen
- Date of birth: July 14, 1977 (age 49)
- Place of birth: Mineola, New York
- Height: 5 ft 8 in (1.73 m)
- Position: Midfielder

Team information
- Current team: UConn Huskies (coach)

Youth career
- Cold Spring Harbor Thumpers
- Huntington High School

College career
Years	Team	Apps	(Gls)
1995–1998	UConn Huskies	99	(43)

Senior career*
Years	Team	Apps	(Gls)
1997–2000	Long Island Lady Riders		
2001–2002	San Diego Spirit	29	(0)
2003	New York Power	21	(2)

Managerial career
- 2018–: UConn Huskies
- * Club domestic league appearances and goals

Margaret Rodriguez (née Tietjen; born July 14, 1977) is an American retired soccer player who used to play for the New York Power.

== Early life and education ==
Rodriguez and her identical twin sister, Jennifer, were born in 1977; they have two older brothers. The sisters played with the Cold Spring Harbor Thumpers, where they won multiple Long Island Junior Soccer League and Eastern New York Youth Soccer Association titles.

They attended Huntington High School. In 1994, the sisters were named All-Americans and Co-Players of the Year in New York and helped their team win the state title.

Following their graduation in 1995, Rodriguez attended the University of Connecticut, graduating with a Bachelor of Science in kinesiology and fitness management in 1999. She later received a National Soccer Coaches license from United Soccer Coaches.

== Career ==
=== University career ===
While attending the University of Connecticut, Rodriguez played for the university's soccer team. From 1995 to 1998, she scored 128 points, landing her on the university's list of the highest scoring soccer players. Further, having completed 43 goals and 42 assists, she is one of four players from the university to enter the NCAA “40–40” Club. The team participated in three NCAA quarterfinals and one NCAA final.

=== Professional career ===
In 1997, Rodriguez made her debut in the USL W-League playing for the Long Island Lady Riders, whom she played with until 2000. She also trained with the U.S. U-20 National Team in 1997 and 1998. In 2000, she was selected onto the W-1 League All-Star team. During this time, she also received the W-1 league "Golden Boot" award.

She was later drafted onto the San Diego Spirit, a Women's United Soccer Association (WUSA) team. After two season, she transferred to the New York Power, where she played until 2004.

=== Coaching ===
Rodriguez began her career as an assistant coach at Hartford, where she worked for four seasons. During this time, the team won the 2006 America East Conference regular season title and "was named part of the 2006 America East Coaching Staff of the Year."

From 2005 to 2007, Rodriguez worked with the Girls U-14 Olympic Development program.

Rodriguez was an assistant coach for the women's soccer team at the University of Connecticut for 10 seasons before being promoted to head coach in 2018. During her time as assistant coach, the team "won 114 games, made five NCAA tournament appearances, and won a pair of American Athletic Conference regular season and tournament championships".

== Honors ==
In 2019, both Rodriguez and her sister were inducted into the Long Island Soccer Player Hall of Fame.

== Personal life ==
Rodriguez lives in Glastonbury, Connecticut with her husband and their two daughters.
