= Lucy Cappadona =

American soccer player (born 2002)

Personal information
- Full name: Lucy Mae Cappadona
- Date of birth: April 13, 2002 (age 24)
- Place of birth: Marlborough, Massachusetts, United States
- Height: 5 ft 6 in (1.68 m)
- Position: Defender

Team information
- Current team: Montreal Roses
- Number: 2

Youth career
- New England FC

College career
Years	Team	Apps	(Gls)
2020–2024	UConn Huskies	72	(10)

Senior career*
Years	Team	Apps	(Gls)
2025–	Montreal Roses	24	(0)
- * Club domestic league appearances and goals as of October 20, 2025

Lucy Mae Cappadona (born April 13, 2002) is an American soccer player who plays for Montreal Roses FC in the Northern Super League.

== Early life ==
Cappadona played youth soccer with New England FC from age 4. In high school, she also played as a kicker on the boys American football team during her senior year, converting 25 out of 28 extra point attempts.

== College career ==
In 2020, Cappadonna began attending the University of Connecticut, where she played for the women's soccer team. On February 21, 2021, she scored her first goal in her collegiate debut agasint the Rhode Island Rams women's soccer. At the end of her first season, she was named to the Big East Conference All-Freshman Team. Ahead of her junior season, she was named a team captain. At the end of her third season, she was named to the Division I NEWISA All-New England First Team. At the end of her senior season in 2023, she was named to the All-Big East Second Team and the All-East Region Third Team. She returned for a fifth season in 2024 and was named to the Big East All-Preseason Team, prior to the season. That season, she helped UConn win the Big East title and was named to the All-Tournament Team and the Tournament Defensive MVP. At the end of the season, she was once again named to the All-Big East Second Team and the All-East Region Third Team.

== Club career ==
In February 2025, she signed with Canadian club Montreal Roses FC in the Northern Super League.
