= 2013 Butler Bulldogs women's soccer team =

Butler Bulldogs
2013 season
- Head Coaches: Tari St. John; Rob Alman
- Assistant Coaches: Ric Huffman; Abbie Kaul
- Home Stadium: Butler Bowl
- Big East Conference: 0–0–0
- Overall Record: 0–0–0
Home colors	Away colors

The 2013 Butler Bulldogs women's soccer team represented Butler University in the 2013 NCAA Division I women's soccer season. Their head coaches were Tari St. John, serving her 7th year, and Rob Alman, serving his 1st year. The Bulldogs played their home games at the Butler Bowl. This was the first year that Butler competed in the Big East Conference, as they moved from the Atlantic 10 Conference following the 2012–13 academic year.

== Roster ==
As of August 26, 2013

Note: Flags indicate national team as defined under FIFA eligibility rules; some limited exceptions apply. Players may hold more than one non-FIFA nationality.

No.	Pos.	Nation	Player
00	GK	(United States) USA	Jayne Heinrich (Freshman)
0	GK	(United States) USA	Julie Burton (Senior)
1	GK	(United States) USA	Mackenzie Hopkins (Sophomore)
2	MF	(United States) USA	Stephanie Kaylor (Junior)
3	MF	(Japan) JPN	Serina Kashimoto (Freshman)
4	DF	(United States) USA	Kelly Mahoney (Junior)
5	MF	(United States) USA	Laura Luther (Junior)
6	MF	(United States) USA	McKenzie Muchow (Freshman)
7	FW	(United States) USA	Katie Griswold (Senior)
8	MF	(United States) USA	Kaylee Pullins (Freshman)
9	MF	(United States) USA	Sophie Maccagnone (Sophomore)
10	FW	(United States) USA	Elise Kotsakis (Junior)
11	FW	(United States) USA	Hannah Farley (Freshman)
12	FW	(United States) USA	Addison Schaar (Sophomore)

No.	Pos.	Nation	Player
13	DF	(United States) USA	Natalie Nusinow (Sophomore)
14	DF	(United States) USA	Anna Ventimiglia (Senior)
15	MF	(Canada) CAN	Olivia Colosimo (Senior)
16	MF	(United States) USA	Claire Oosterbaan (Freshman)
17	MF	(United States) USA	Mary Allen (Senior)
18	MF	(United States) USA	Katie Reed (Junior)
19	FW	(United States) USA	Ellie Gabriel (Sophomore)
20	DF	(United States) USA	Tessa Faulkens (Freshman)
21	MF	(United States) USA	Caroline Kowal (Junior)
22	MF	(United States) USA	Randi DeLong (Sophomore)
23	MF	(United States) USA	Paige Johnson (Sophomore)
24	MF	(United States) USA	Annie Weber (Freshman)
25	DF	(United States) USA	Ali Backscheider (Senior)
26	FW	(United States) USA	Kathryn Voelker (Freshman)
