= Rachel Corboz =

French-American professional soccer player

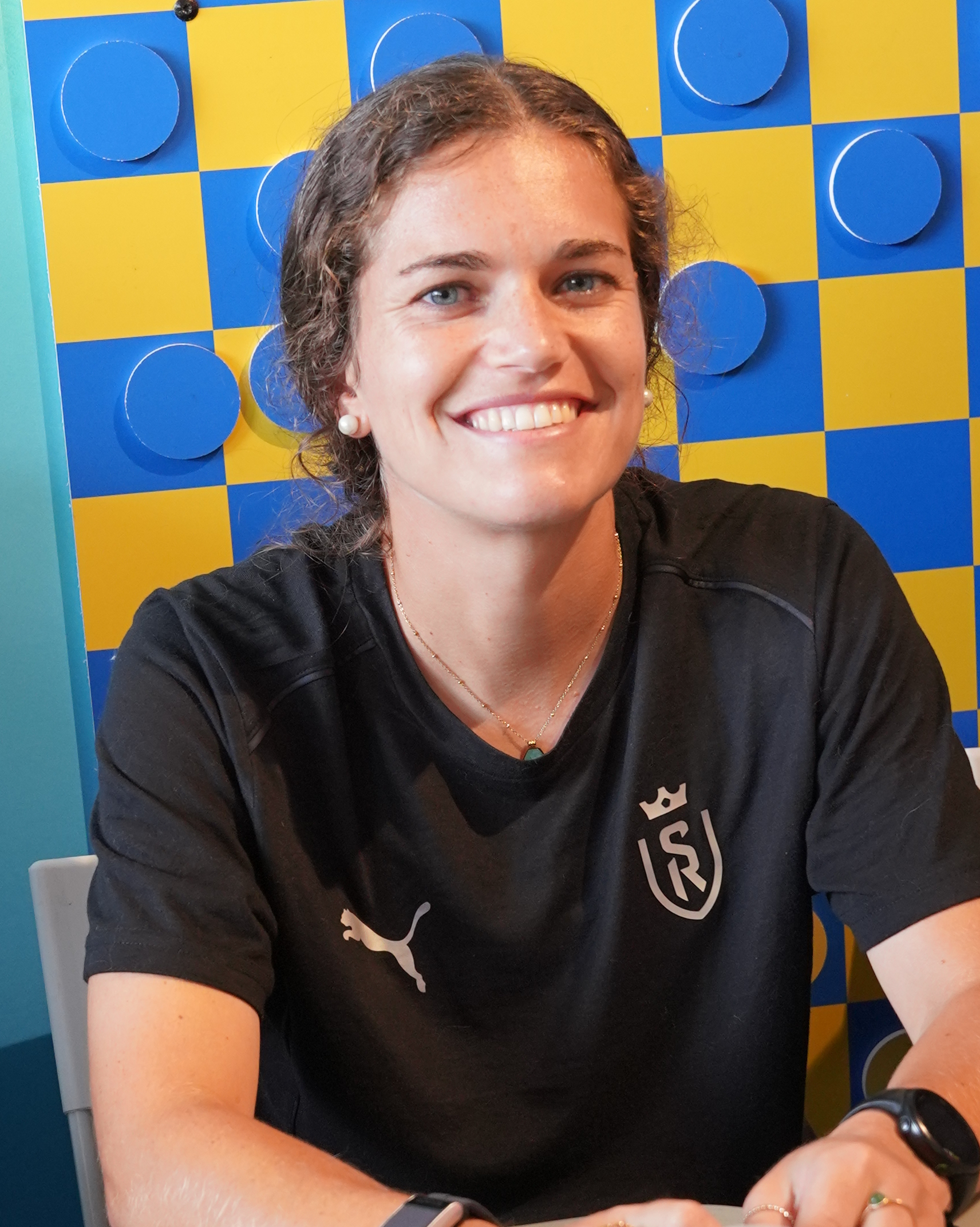
- 2024

Personal information
- Date of birth: May 1, 1996 (age 30)
- Place of birth: Mobile, Alabama, United States
- Height: 5 ft 5 in (1.65 m)
- Position: Midfielder

Team information
- Current team: Saint-Étienne
- Number: 10

Youth career
- PDA Slammers
- 2010–2013: Pingry School
- New York Surf

College career
Years	Team	Apps	(Gls)
2014–2017	Georgetown Hoyas	88	(34)

Senior career*
Years	Team	Apps	(Gls)
2018–2019	Fleury	19	(0)
2019–2025	Reims	120	(17)
2025–	Saint-Étienne	3	(1)

International career
2013	United States U-18		
2015	United States U-20		
- * Club domestic league appearances and goals as of 2 October 2025

Rachel Corboz (born May 1, 1996) is a French-American professional soccer player who plays as a midfielder for Première Ligue club Saint-Étienne.

== Early life ==
Born to French-born parents, Michel and Christine, Corboz has a dual citizenship with France. She was born in Mobile, Alabama, where her father, a former semi-professional player in Grenoble, was pursuing his postdoctoral research at the University of South Alabama. Her mother is an accountant. She grew up in Green Brook Township, New Jersey and attended the Pingry School. Her brother, Mael played soccer for Rutgers before transferring to Maryland, and her older sister Daphne, who is three years her senior, was her teammate both at Georgetown and at FC Fleury.

== College career ==
Corboz had a four-year career with the Georgetown University women's soccer team where she scored 34 goals in 88 appearances. Her freshman year she was named to the All-Big East Second team and Rookie team selection. She followed this her sophomore year by being named to the All-Big East First team, All-Big East Academic All-Star and Big East Midfielder of the Year. She again was named to the All-Big East First team in her junior year and was named to the NSCAA All-American First team and a semifinalist for the MAC Herman Trophy. She was again named and All-American, MAC Herman semifinalist and Big East Midfielder of the Year her senior year.

== Club career ==
After being a late addition to the 2018 NWSL College Draft, Corboz went undrafted. She was however called in to preseason camp by the Reign FC as a discovery player.

=== FC Fleury 91 ===
Corboz signed for FC Fleury on June 16, 2018. In her first season with the club she made 19 appearances.

=== Stade de Reims ===
In 2019, Corboz signed for Stade de Reims. She was named the team's captain at the beginning of the 2021-2022 season.

=== Saint-Étienne ===
On 28 June 2025, Corboz signed for Saint-Étienne. She made her debut on 6 September 2025 against Nantes, where she scored her first goal for Les Vertes after 4 minutes.

== International career ==
Corboz has been previously selected to train with the United States U-18 and United States U-20.
