= Julia Leas =

American soccer player (born 2001)

Personal information
- Full name: Julia Nicole Leas
- Date of birth: March 3, 2001 (age 25)
- Place of birth: Vienna, Virginia, United States
- Height: 5 ft 8 in (1.73 m)
- Positions: Defensive midfielder; center back

Team information
- Current team: Montreal Roses FC
- Number: 5

College career
Years	Team	Apps	(Gls)
2019–2023	Georgetown Hoyas	100	(16)

Senior career*
Years	Team	Apps	(Gls)
2024	Vittsjö GIK	24	(2)
2025–	Montreal Roses FC	12	(0)
- * Club domestic league appearances and goals as of October 20, 2025

Julia Nicole Leas (March 3, 2001) is an American professional soccer player who plays as a defensive midfielder for Canadian Northern Super League club Montreal Roses FC. She played college soccer for the Georgetown Hoyas, where she was a two-time first-team All-American.

== Early life ==
Leas was raised in Vienna, Virginia, and attended James Madison High School, where she scored 71 goals in four seasons. She helped lead her high school team to state semifinal and runner-up finishes in 2017 and 2018. She captained the team for two years and was named the Virginia Gatorade Player of the Year as a senior in 2019. She played club soccer for Mclean Soccer, where she made the ECNL national finals and was named ECNL All-American in 2019.

== College career ==
Leas was a five-year starter for the Georgetown Hoyas, where she recorded 16 goals and 16 assists in 100 appearances as a defensive midfielder or center back. She led Georgetown to four straight Big East Conference championships in each of her last four years. She was named to the Big East all-freshman team in 2019, all-conference third team in 2020, all-conference second team in 2021, and all-conference first team and United Soccer Coaches All-American first team in 2022 and 2023. She was additionally named the Big East midfielder of the year in 2021 and Big East defensive player of the year in 2022 and 2023.

== Club career ==
After withdrawing her name from the 2024 NWSL Draft, Leas signed a one-year deal with Swedish club Vittsjö GIK on January 24, 2024. On March 9, she scored on her club debut, a 5–0 win over IFK Göteborg in the Swedish Cup group stage. She made her first league start against BK Häcken on June 17, after which she held a starting position throughout the rest of the year. She scored her first Damallsvenskan goal in a 3–2 comeback win over AIK on August 24. She finished the season with 2 goals in 24 league games (14 starts) as Vittsjö placed 8th of 14 teams.

On February 7, 2025, Leas signed with Canadian club Montreal Roses FC ahead of the inaugural Northern Super League season.
