= Maryland SportsPlex =

Sports complex in Germantown, Maryland, United States

Coordinates: 39.15271°N 77.310131°W

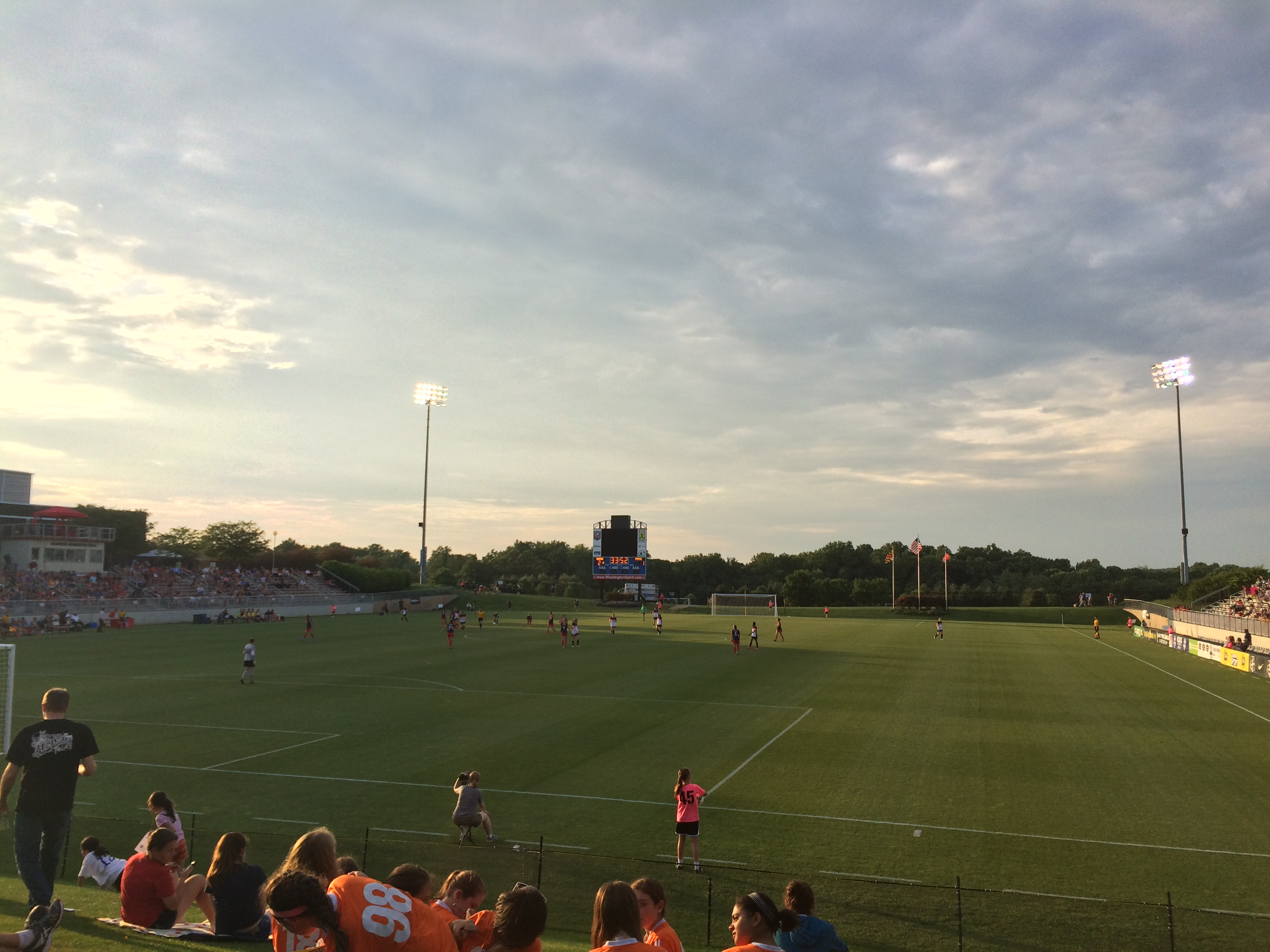
- Soccer match at the complex in 2015
- Full name: Maryland SportsPlex & Adventist Healthcare Fieldhouse
- Former names: Maryland SoccerPlex
- Address: 18031 Central Park Circle; Boyds, Maryland; United States
- Owner: Maryland Soccer Foundation; Montgomery County, MD
- Operator: Maryland Soccer Foundation
- Capacity: 5,000
- Type: Sports complex
- Surface: Bermuda Grass (13 fields) Bluegrass (8 fields) Bermuda Grass Stadium, 21 natural grass fields); Artificial turf (3 fields)
- Current use: Soccer

Construction
- Groundbreaking: 1999
- Opened: 2000; 26 years ago

Tenants
- Washington Freedom Futures (W-League) (2004–2010); Real Maryland F.C. (PDL) (2008); Washington Freedom (WPS) (2009–2010); D.C. United Women (W-League) (2011–2012); D.C. United U-23 (PDL/NPSL) (2012–2015); Washington Spirit (NWSL) (2013–2020); Washington Spirit Reserves (WPSL) (2013–2018); Maryland Bobcats FC (NISA) (2021–2024); Old Glory DC (MLR) (2024–2025); DC Hyper (UPSL Premier) (2026); Besthesda Soccer Club (USL League 2) (2026–Present)

Website
- mdsoccerplex.org

The Maryland SportsPlex (formerly Maryland SoccerPlex) is a sports complex in Germantown, Maryland, although its mailing address is directed to Boyds, Maryland. The facility, completed in 2000 and operated by the Maryland Soccer Foundation (MSF), has 21 natural grass fields, 3 artificial turf fields, and 8 indoor convertible basketball/volleyball courts.

In the park there are also two miniature golf courses, a splash park, a driving range, an archery course, community garden, model boat pond, a bike park featuring a linked jump line and a pump track, tennis center, and a swim center.

== History ==
=== Planning and funding ===
The Maryland SportsPlex was completed in 2000 with $15 million raised by a group of Montgomery County, Maryland soccer parents led by Discovery Communications chairman John Hendricks and his wife Maureen (also co-founders of Washington Freedom soccer team) through private donations and government-backed bonds. It was built as a private-public partnership between the Maryland Soccer Foundation, created in 1997 to build and operate the complex, and the Maryland-National Capital Park and Planning Commission.

However, initial revenues fell short of projections and the foundation took on $14 million in debt, nearly triple the amount projected, and the Hendrickses donated a further $6 million in 2005 to stabilize funding and build additional fields.

In August 2026, The Maryland Soccer Foundation announced a rebrand where the Maryland SoccerPlex would be renamed the Maryland SportsPlex to better reflect the variety of sports and activities that take place on the campus.

== Overview ==
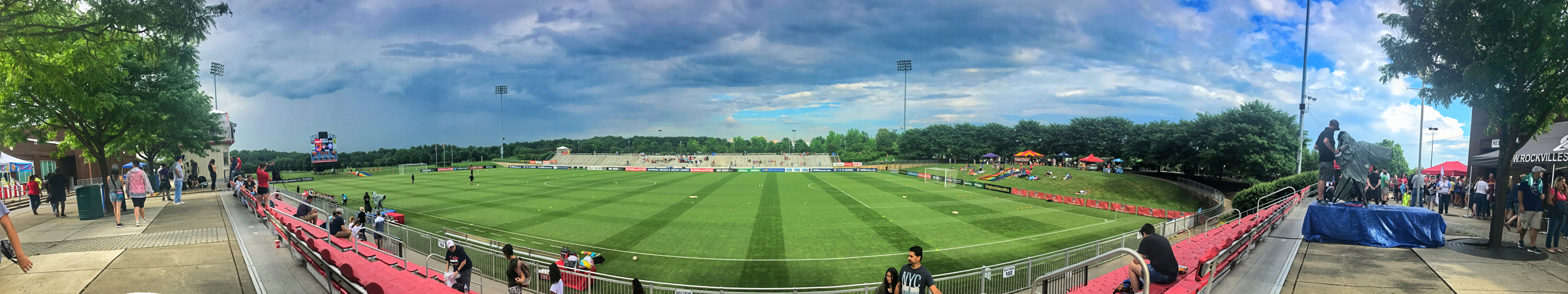
Maryland SportsPlex in June 2018

The main stadium holds 4,000 and was home to the Washington Freedom during its time in the Women's Professional Soccer, and the Washington Spirit of the National Women's Soccer League played its regular-season games there between 2013 and 2019.

The main stadium was renamed Maureen Hendricks Field in a ceremony before a Spirit game on June 15, 2013.

On December 31, 2018, the founding executive director, Trish Heffelfinger, retired from the Maryland Soccer Foundation. Matt Libber, formerly of Elite Tournaments, took over the executive director role in January 2019.

The Maryland SportsPlex has been the host venue for the National Collegiate Rugby 7s Championships since 2023

The SportsPlex hosted Old Glory DC, a Major League Rugby in its 2024 and 2025 seasons.

The stadium features seating for 5,000, including the general admission lawn, with corresponding restroom facilities, formal press box, and box office. The grass playing field measures 115 x 75 yards.

The stadium has previously hosted a US Olympic qualifier, U.S. Open Cup matches, a CONCACAF Champions League match, the ACC Men's Soccer Championships, USL and W League matches, training sessions for Argentina's Boca Juniors and the New Zealand National team. The US Youth Soccer National Championships were also held at the Maryland SportsPlex.
