= UConn Huskies women's soccer =

American college soccer team

Connecticut Huskies women's soccer
- Founded: 1979; 47 years ago
- University: University of Connecticut
- Head coach: Margaret Rodriguez (9th season)
- Conference: Big East
- Location: Storrs, Connecticut, US
- Stadium: Joseph J. Morrone Stadium (capacity: 5,100)
- Nickname: Huskies
- Colors: National flag blue and white
Home	Away

NCAA tournament runner-up
- 1984, 1990, 1997, 2003

NCAA tournament Semifinals
- 1982, 1983, 1984, 1990, 1994, 1997, 2003

NCAA tournament Quarterfinals
- 1982, 1983, 1984, 1986, 1987, 1990, 1991, 1993, 1994, 1995, 1996, 1997, 1998, 1999, 2000, 2002, 2003, 2007

NCAA tournament appearances
- 1982, 1983, 1984, 1985, 1986, 1987, 1988, 1989, 1990, 1991, 1992, 1993, 1994, 1995, 1996, 1997, 1998, 1999, 2000, 2001, 2002, 2003, 2004, 2005, 2006, 2007, 2009, 2010, 2014, 2015, 2016, 2024

Conference tournament championships
- American: 2014, 2016; Big East: 2002, 2004, 2024

Conference regular season championships
- 1995, 1998, 1999, 2000, 2001, 2002, 2003, 2005, 2016

The Connecticut Huskies women's soccer team is an intercollegiate varsity sports team of the University of Connecticut. The team is currently a member of the Big East Conference of the National Collegiate Athletic Association (NCAA). The Huskies have appeared in 32 NCAA Tournaments, second all-time, and seven College Cups, tied for seventh all-time.

== Head coaches ==
The table below shows the Huskies' head coaches and also their records through the 2020 season.

Name	Seasons	W	L	T	Pct.
Maggie Dunlop	2	24	10	2	.694
Len Tsantiris	37	570	201	59	.722
Margaret Rodriguez	3	10	22	3	.329
Totals	42	604	233	64	.706

== Stadium ==
UConn plays its home games at Morrone Stadium, a 5,100-capacity soccer-specific stadium on the main University of Connecticut in Storrs, Connecticut.
