= Boyds, Maryland =

Unincorporated community in Maryland, United States

- Unincorporated community
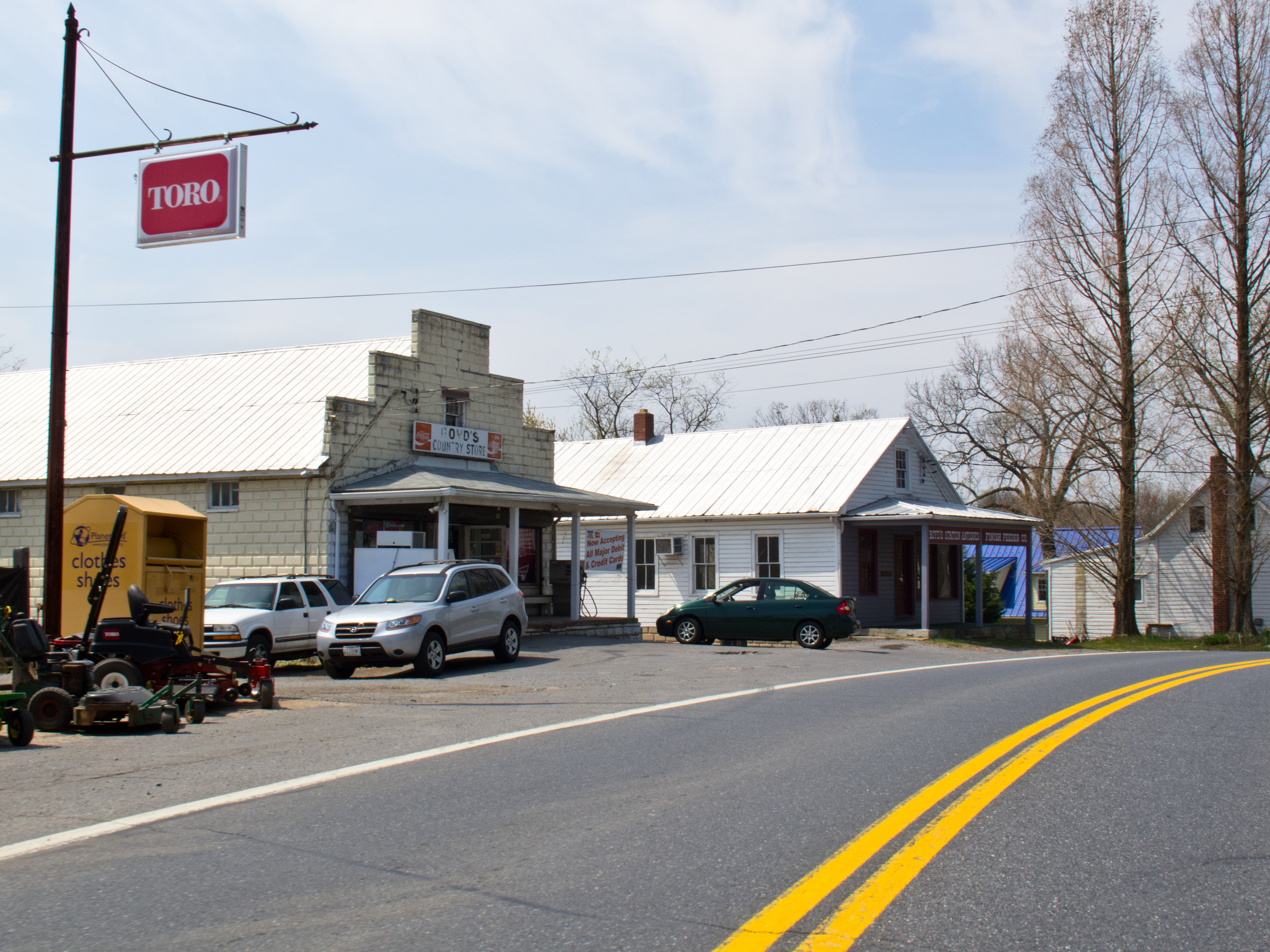
- Boyds, Maryland, seen from Maryland Route 117

- Location within Maryland Location within the United States
- Coordinates: 39°11′01″N 77°18′46″W
- Country: United States
- State: Maryland
- County: Montgomery

Population (2020)
  - Total: 9,538
- Time zone: UTC-5 (Eastern (EST))
  - Summer (DST): UTC-4 (EDT)
- ZIP code: 20841
- Area codes: 240 and 301

Boyds is an unincorporated community in exurban Montgomery County, Maryland, United States, located approximately 27 miles (43 km) north of Washington, D.C. Its ZIP Code is 20841.

According to the United States 2020 Census, the ZIP Code Tabulation Area (ZCTA) for Boyds covers an area of about 27 square miles (70 km^{2}) and has a population of 9,538. Black Hill Regional Park, Little Seneca Lake, and Seneca Creek State Park are located in Boyds.

== History ==
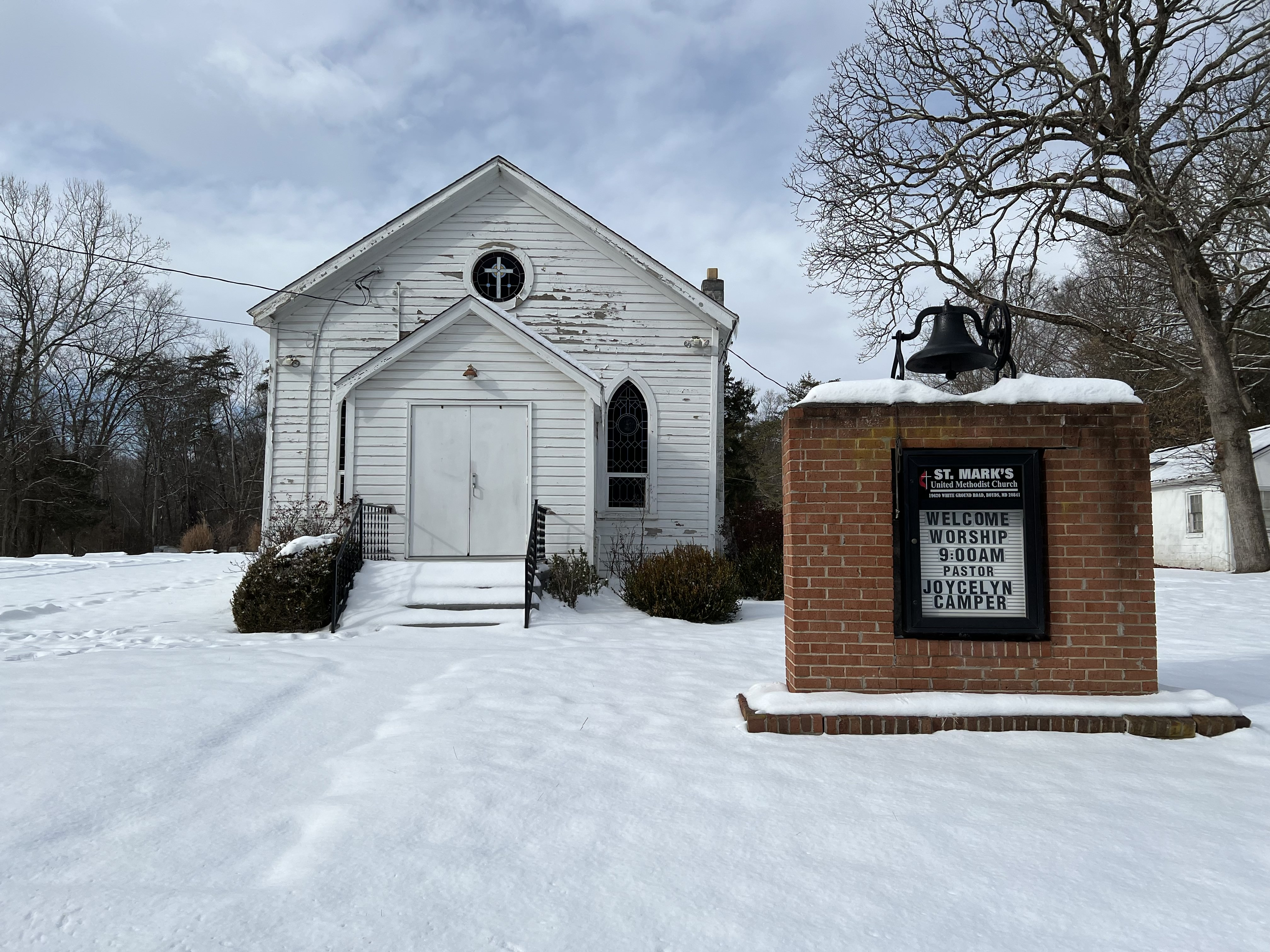
A church in Boyds

The community was named for Colonel James Alexander Boyd (1823–1896), a Scottish immigrant who was a construction engineer for the Baltimore and Ohio Railroad. Boyd built a temporary village to house construction workers as the Baltimore and Ohio Railroad built the Metropolitan Branch line after the American Civil War. The railroad line began service in 1873. After the railroad station opened, a mill, stores, and other businesses were established in the area. The Baltimore and Ohio Railroad opened a brick railroad station in 1887. The railroad station was demolished to make way for installation of a second track in 1927. A wooden station was built as a replacement, but it was later taken down. Commuter Rail service (primarily to Washington, D.C.) is still provided at Boyds by the MARC system.

James Boyd established dairy farms in the area and lived in the town until his death in 1896.

=== Boyds Negro School ===
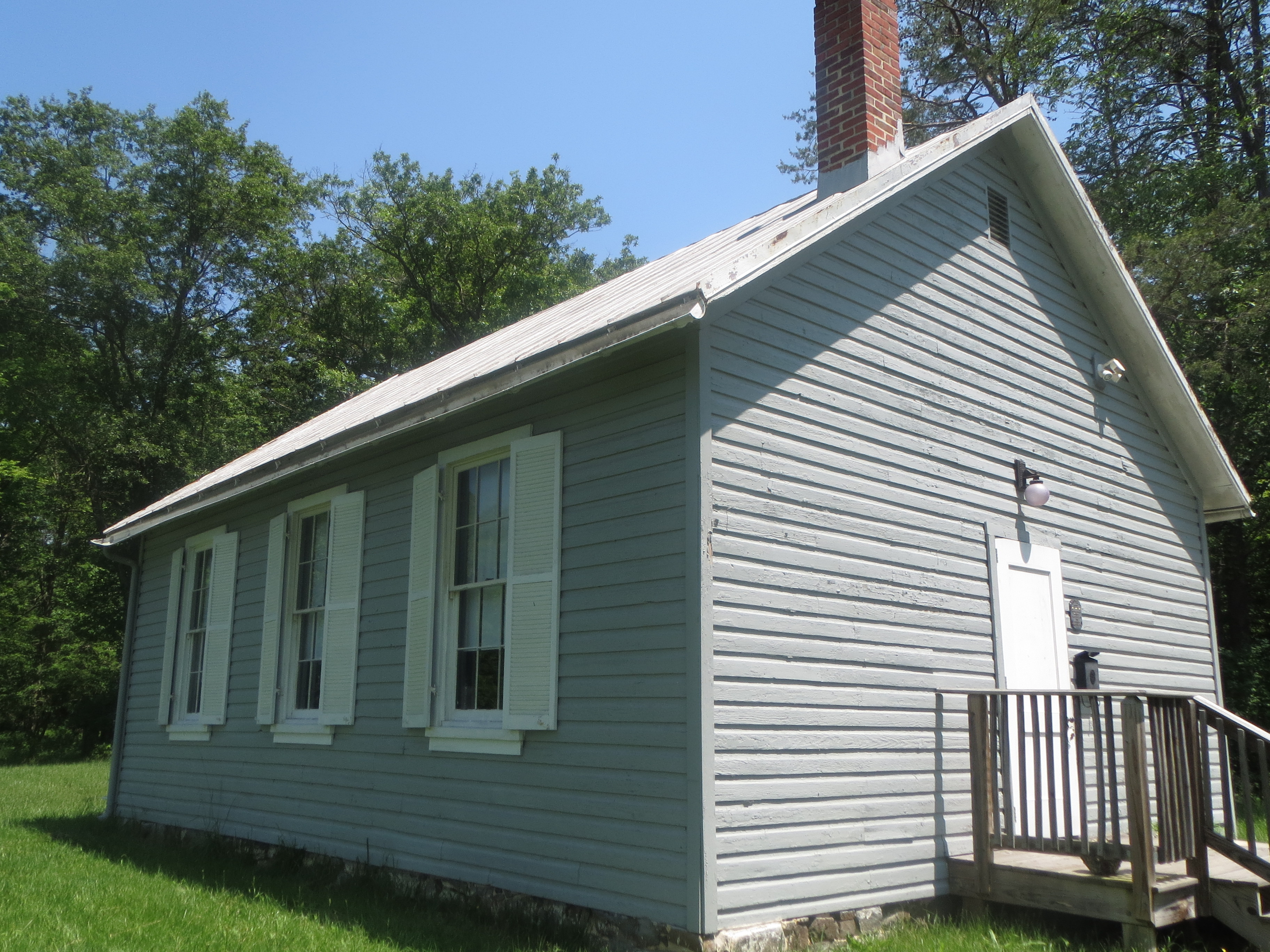
Boyds Negro School in 2013

Boyds Negro School, located at 19510 White Ground Road, was the only public school erected for African Americans who lived in the area from 1896 to 1936. Boyds Negro School is a Maryland Historic Site.

Boyds Negro School is a small, one-room school house, containing a small number of desks, a blackboard, and a potbelly stove, as well as a framed picture of abolitionist Frederick Douglass.

Subjects taught in the school included spelling, cooking, reading, singing, and weaving.

Boyds Negro School was renovated by the Boyds Historical Society in 1989. The Boyds Historical Society filled the building with furnishings so the school would look as it did in the early 1900s.

In 2006, termites caused major damage to the wooden floor boards, and the school building was renovated. Boyds Negro School reopened on June 28, 2008, one of Montgomery County's annual heritage days.

Boyds Negro School is currently open to the public on the last Sunday of every month, from 2:00 to 4:00 PM, April through October or upon request.

=== Boyds Mercantile and Stores ===
The first Boyds Country Store was opened in 1873, the same year that the railroad was connected to the town. It was run by James E. Williams. The store served as a market of goods for both citizens and passers-bye in Boyds, as well as a meeting place for the townspeople in the afternoon.

Colonel Boyd built a second store across the road in 1895. It housed the general store and post office on its first floor and a town hall on the second floor along with a dance hall.

As time went by, the town hall became smaller and smaller as the building was used for additional purposes until it was finally torn down for salvageable lumber in the early 1940s. In the evenings, families would gather on the front porch of the general store; the parents talking and their children playing out on the lawn in front of the store. After the first country store became vacant in 1946, it was bought in an auction by Brice P. Selby. He was known to allow his customers to buy on credit, resulting in not much cash profit for him and his store. However, Selby was well known as a kind and generous soul.

A third store, known as the Boyds Country Market, exists on Barnesville Road across from the site of the old town hall. Boyds Country Market was built by Will Williams in 1933.

The first two Boyds Country Stores, as well as the town hall, old Hoyle's Mill, and a hardware store were all destroyed in the development of the surrounding area.

A small post office was located at the back of the country store from the early 1930s until 1974, when it was relocated to a new building on Barnesville Road, where it still sits today.

=== Transportation ===
Boyds is a stop on MARC Train's Brunswick Line between Washington, D.C. and Martinsburg, West Virginia.
