= Butler Bulldogs women's soccer =

American college soccer team

Butler Bulldogs
- 2025 Butler Bulldogs women's soccer team
- Founded: 1991; 35 years ago
- University: Butler University
- Head coach: Tari St. John (21st season); Rob Alman (15th season)
- Conference: Big East
- Location: Indianapolis, Indiana, US
- Stadium: Butler Bowl (capacity: 7,500)
- Nickname: Bulldogs
- Colors: Blue and white
| Home | Away |

NCAA tournament appearances
- 2015, 2017, 2021

Conference tournament championships
- 1996, 2015

Conference regular season championships
- 1995, 1996, 1999, 2010, 2020 (Note: 1st in Big East Midwest Division due to COVID-19 impacted season.)

The Butler Bulldogs women's soccer team is an intercollegiate varsity sports team for Butler University, an NCAA Division I member school located in Indianapolis, IN. Butler currently plays in the Big East Conference. The Bulldogs are led by their co-head coaches Tari St. John and Rob Alman.

== History ==
Butler University first fielded a varsity women's soccer team in 1991, when they earned a 10–7–1 record under head coach Bryan Blitz, including a 0–3–0 record in the Midwestern Collegiate Conference (now called the Horizon League as of 2001). Coach Blitz left the program following the 1995 season, the same season as the Bulldogs' first conference championship. The Bulldogs were next coached by George Van Linder, who led the team to its second conference championship and two conference runner-up finishes before departing after the 1998 season. Woody Sherwood served as the Bulldogs' third women's soccer coach and led the team to its third conference championship in 1999; under his leadership the team only once finished lower than third in the Horizon League.

The Bulldogs' current head coach, Tari St. John began serving as head coach starting in the 2006 season. Aside from the head coach, Butler employs one assistant coach on a part-time basis. This position is currently held by Ric Huffman, who has held the position since 2009. Huffman also serves as the head coach of the Dynamo Football Club, also located in Indianapolis, and is a former member of the Indiana University men's soccer team and the Indiana Twisters of the Continental Indoor Soccer League. He also played on the 1998 National Indoor Championship team. The position was previously held by Greg Miller, who is the current head coach for the Pittsburgh Panthers. All other women's soccer coaches serve on a volunteer basis.

Butler left the Horizon League following the 2011 season when the athletic department moved to the Atlantic 10 Conference. During their time in the Horizon, the Bulldogs earned one conference tournament championship, in 1996, but the team did not qualify for the NCAA tournament because the conference did not have an automatic bid at that time. However, the team was the tournament runner-up six times, in 1994, 1997, 1998, 2001, 2002, and 2010. The team also won four conference season championships, in 1995, 1996, 1999, and 2010.

Joining the Atlantic 10 Conference presented some challenges, including schedule adjustments, because the move came a year ahead of schedule. For example, the Bulldogs were scheduled to play an exhibition game against the defending Atlantic 10 champions, the Dayton Flyers, but the game had to be rescheduled as a conference game later in the season. Other teams had to redo their schedules in a matter of weeks after their previously finalized schedules were already released.

The Bulldogs only competed for one season in the Atlantic 10 in 2012 before moving to the Big East Conference in 2013. Butler was Big East tournament champions in 2015 and received an NCAA tournament autobid. They earned at-large bids to the 2017 and 2021 NCAA tournaments.

== Yearly records ==
Record table
| Season | Coach | Overall | Conference | Standing | Postseason |
|---|---|---|---|---|---|
Bryan Blitz (Horizon League) (1991–1995)
| 1991 | Bryan Blitz | 10–7–1 | 0–3–0 | 4th | |
| 1992 | Bryan Blitz | 8–9–2 | 2–3–0 | 4th | |
| 1993 | Bryan Blitz | 6–11–3 | 2–3–1 | 4th | |
| 1994 | Bryan Blitz | 11–10–0 | 4–2–0 | 3rd | |
| 1995 | Bryan Blitz | 10–7–2 | 6–0–0 | 1st | |
| Bryan Blitz: | | 45–44–8 | 14–11–1 | | |
George Van Linder (Horizon League) (1996–1998)
| 1996 | George Van Linder | 12–7–1 | 5–1–0 | T-1st | |
| 1997 | George Van Linder | 12–7–2 | 3–1–1 | T-2nd | |
| 1998 | George Van Linder | 10–13–0 | 3–2–0 | T-2nd | |
| George Van Linder: | | 34–27–3 | 11–4–1 | | |
Woody Sherwood (Horizon League) (1999–2005)
| 1999 | Woody Sherwood | 5–11–2 | 4–1–0 | T-1st | |
| 2000 | Woody Sherwood | 7–11–2 | 2–2–1 | T-3rd | |
| 2001 | Woody Sherwood | 31–7–0 | 4–2–0 | 2nd | |
| 2002 | Woody Sherwood | 15–6–0 | 4–2–0 | 2nd | |
| 2003 | Woody Sherwood | 8–9–2 | 4–2–0 | T-2nd | |
| 2004 | Woody Sherwood | 7–10–2 | 4–3–0 | 3rd | |
| 2005 | Woody Sherwood | 8–10–2 | 2–5–0 | T-5th | |
| Woody Sherwood: | | 63–64–10 | 25–16–1 | | |
Tari St. John (Horizon League) (2006–2011)
| 2006 | Tari St. John | 5–11–3 | 2–4–1 | 6th | |
| 2007 | Tari St. John | 10–9–1 | 5–3–0 | 4th | |
| 2008 | Tari St. John | 11–11–0 | 4–4–0 | T-4th | |
| 2009 | Tari St. John | 7–11–2 | 3–4–1 | 5th | |
| 2010 | Tari St. John | 9–11–0 | 6–2–0 | T-1st | |
| 2011 | Tari St. John | 8–10–2 | 3–5–0 | 6th | |
| Horizon League: | | | 73–53–5 | | |
Tari St. John (Atlantic 10) (2012)
| 2012 | Tari St. John | 12–5–4 | 5–1–3 | 4th | |
| Tari St. John: | | 50–63–8 | 23–22–2 (Horizon); 5–1–3 (Atlantic 10) | | |
| Atlantic 10: | | 5–1–3 | 5–1–3 | | |
Tari St. John / Rob Alman (Big East Conference) (2013–present)
| 2013 | St. John / Alman | 11–7–2 | 4–5–0 | 5th | |
| 2014 | St. John / Alman | 9–8–2 | 3–4–2 | 6th | |
| 2015 | St. John / Alman | 16–7–1 | 6–3–0 | 4th | NCAA 1st Round |
| Total: | | 204–203–33 | | | |
National champion Postseason invitational champion Conference regular season champion Conference regular season and conference tournament champion Division regular season champion Division regular season and conference tournament champion Conference tournament champion

== Players, awards, and recognition ==
NSCAA All-Americans

| 1994 | Chris Johnson | (2nd team) |

NSCAA Regional (Mideast) All-Americans

| 1994 | Chris Johnson | (1st team) |
| | Emily Winternheimer | (2nd team) |

NSCAA Regional (Great Lakes) All-Americans

| 1995 | Joy Aschenbrener |
| | Beth Crauder |
| 1996 | Beth Crauder |
| | Alisa Pykett |
| 2005 | Meredith Buemi |
| 2008 | Molly Kruger |

Soccer Buzz All-Great Lakes Team

| 1996 | Joy Aschenbrener | (3rd team) |
| | Beth Crauder | (3rd team) |
| | Summer Lawler | (3rd team) |
| 1997 | Joy Aschenbrener | (3rd team) |
| 2002 | Amy Morrison | (2nd team) |
| | Kate Lord | (Newcomer) |

Soccer Buzz All-American Freshman Team

| 2002 | Kate Lord | (2nd team) |

Horizon League Cecil M. Coleman Award

| 1996 | Alisa Pykett |

== Outreach ==
In response to the growth of interested youths in the Indianapolis area, where the Butler Bulldogs are located, the soccer program offers several soccer camps for various age groups. The camp is instructed by several members of the women's soccer program, including head coach Tari St. John.

In addition to the camps, the Butler Bulldogs women's soccer program annually wears pink jerseys in support the "fight against breast cancer." The jerseys are sold to the public following the game to raise proceeds for the cause.
