= St. John's Red Storm women's soccer =

American college soccer team

St. John's Red Storm
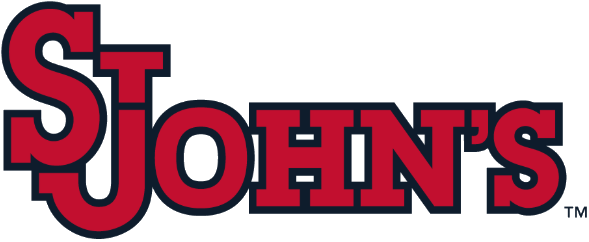
- University: St. John's University
- Founded: 1987
- Head coach: Ian Stone (33rd season)
- Location: New York City, New York
- Conference: Big East
- Nickname: Red Storm
- Colors: Red and white

NCAA Division I tournament appearances
- 2009, 2013, 2015, 2021

Conference tournament champions
- 1994

Conference regular-season champions
- 2015

The St. John's Red Storm women's soccer is the team that represents St. John's University in New York City, New York, United States. The school's team competes in the Big East. The team competes at the Cox Family Field at Belson Stadium. The Red Storm are currently coached by Ian Stone.

== History ==
The St. John’s women's soccer program began in 1987. The Red Storm have been Big East tournament champions once in 1994 and regular season Big East champions in 2015. St. John’s appeared in the NCAA tournament in 2009, 2013, 2015, and 2021.
