= Xavier Musketeers women's soccer =

American college soccer team

- University: Xavier University
- Head coach: Katy Etelman (1st season)
- Nickname: Musketeers
- Colors: Navy blue, white, and gray

NCAA tournament Round of 32
- 2019, 2022, 2025

NCAA tournament appearances
- 1998, 2000, 2019, 2021, 2022, 2023, 2025

Conference tournament championships
- 1998, 2000, 2019, 2025

The Xavier Musketeers women's soccer is the team that represents Xavier University in NCAA Division I college soccer. Xavier competes in the Big East Conference. The Musketeers are led by their head coach Katy Etelman.

== History ==
The Musketeers began competition in women's soccer in 1984.

In 1998, Xavier was Atlantic-10 Conference tournament champions, winning the title 2-1 over Dayton. In the NCAA tournament, the Musketeers lost the first round to Michigan 4-2.

In 2000, the Musketeers again won the Atlantic-10 Conference tournament after being runner-ups in 1999. In the 2000 NCAA tournament, they lost in the first round to Illinois 2-0.

In 2013, Xavier moved from the Atlantic-10 Conference to the Big East Conference for women's soccer.

In 2019, Xavier won their first conference tournament title in the Big East and made their first NCAA tournament appearance in 19 years. In the 2019 NCAA tournament, they won their first-ever NCAA tournament game, defeating Virginia Tech 1-0. In the Round of 32, Xavier lost 3-0 to Kansas.

In 2021, the Musketeers finished with a 16-3-1 record. After losing in the Big East semifinals, Xavier received an at-large NCAA tournament bid but lost in the NCAA first round to Milwaukee 1-0.

In 2022, Xavier finished with a 14-4-5 record and was Big East tournament runner-ups. They received an at-large bid to the NCAA tournament and defeated Tennessee in the first round. In the round of 32, Xavier lost to Virginia 3-1.

In 2023, Xavier received a third consecutive at-large bid to the NCAA tournament after losing in the Big East finals. They lost 1-0 to Tennessee in the NCAA first round.

In 2025, the Musketeers returned to the top of the Big East by winning the Big East championship 2-0 over Georgetown. This was the program's second Big East title since joining the Big East. In the 2025 NCAA Division I women's soccer tournament, the Musketeers defeated Dayton 2-0 in the 1st round and lost to Colorado 4-1 in the Round of 32.
