= Georgetown Hoyas women's soccer =

American college soccer team

- Founded: 1993
- University: Georgetown University
- Head coach: Dave Nolan (23rd season)
- Location: Washington, DC, US
- Stadium: Shaw Field (capacity: 1,625)
- Nickname: Hoyas
- Colors: Blue and gray

NCAA tournament College Cup
- 2016, 2018

NCAA tournament Quarterfinals
- 2010, 2016, 2018

NCAA tournament Round of 16
- 2010, 2016, 2018, 2019, 2020, 2025

NCAA tournament Round of 32
- 2010, 2012, 2013, 2014, 2016, 2018, 2019, 2020, 2021, 2022, 2023, 2024, 2025

NCAA tournament appearances
- 2007, 2010, 2012, 2013, 2014, 2015, 2016, 2017, 2018, 2019, 2020, 2021, 2022, 2023, 2024, 2025

The Georgetown Hoyas women's soccer is the team who represents Georgetown University in NCAA Division I college soccer. Georgetown competes in the Big East Conference. The Hoyas are coached by Dave Nolan.

== History ==
Georgetown women's soccer began in 1993.

The Hoyas made their first NCAA tournament appearance in 2007, losing to William & Mary in the first round 2-1.

In 2010, Georgetown went to the NCAA tournament Elite 8 (quarterfinals) following wins over Siena, Maryland, and Minnesota, losing to Ohio State 2-0 in the Elite 8.

Georgetown went to the NCAA tournament second round in 2012, losing to Baylor 2-1 (OT).

In 2013, the Hoyas appeared in the NCAA tournament second round, falling to Virginia 1-0.

The Hoyas went to the NCAA tournament second round in 2014, losing to Virginia Tech 4-3 in OT.

Georgetown lost in the NCAA tournament first round in 2015 to Hofstra.

In 2016, the Hoyas made a historic run to the Final Four, the first in program history, they lost in the Final Four to USC 1-0.

Georgetown lost in the NCAA first round to Wake Forest in 2017.

In 2018, the Hoyas returned to the Final Four, eventually losing to North Carolina 1-0 in 2OT.

Georgetown appeared in the NCAA Sweet 16 in 2019, losing to West Virginia.

In 2020, Georgetown lost in the Sweet 16 for a second straight year, losing to TCU in penalties.

Georgetown lost in the NCAA second round to Santa Clara 2-1 in 2021.

In 2022, the Hoyas lost to Pittsburgh in the NCAA second round 2-1.

Georgetown again fell in the second round for the third consecutive time, losing to Saint Louis 2-1 in the 2023 NCAA tournament.

In 2024, the Hoyas lost for the fourth consecutive time in the NCAA second round, 1-0 to Iowa. Georgetown finished the 2024 season with a final record of 13-4-4.

The Hoyas broke their NCAA tournament second round losing streak in 2025 with a second round win over West Virginia, advancing to play Florida State in the Sweet 16. In the Sweet 16, Georgetown lost to Florida State 3-1. This marked the team's first Sweet 16 appearance since 2020.
