= 2023 NCAA Division I women's soccer season =

American college soccer season

- Number of teams: 347
- Preseason No. 1: UCLA
- Hermann Trophy: Onyi Echegini
- Top goalscorer: Eleanor Dale – Nebraska – 25 goals

Statistics
- Biggest home win: 15 goals: Eastern Washington 16–1 University of Providence (August 31)
- Biggest away win: 16 goals: Arkansas-Pine Bluff 16–0 Tougaloo College (August 17)
- Highest scoring: 17 goals: Eastern Washington 16–1 University of Providence (August 31)
- Longest winning run: 15 games, Florida State (September 29, 2023 – Present)
- Longest unbeaten run: 36 games, Stanford (September 23, 2022 – December 4, 2023)
- Longest winless run: 44 games Mississippi Valley State (September 6, 2019 – September 14, 2023)
- Longest losing run: 19 games Hampton (October 23, 2022 – Present)

Tournament
- Duration: November 10 – December 4, 2023
- Most conference bids: Big Ten – 9 bids

College Cup
- Date: December 4, 2023
- Site: WakeMed Soccer Park; Cary, North Carolina
- Champions: Florida State
- Runners-up: Stanford

Seasons
- ← 2022 2024 →

The 2023 NCAA Division I women's soccer season was the 42nd season of NCAA championship women's college soccer.

The season began on August 17, 2023, and concluded in November 2023. It will culminate with the 2023 NCAA Division I women's soccer tournament, with the College Cup being held at WakeMed Soccer Park in Cary, North Carolina.

UCLA were the defending NCAA Champions. The Bruins were unable to defend their title as they were defeated in the first round of 2023 tournament by UC Irvine 1–0. Florida State faced off against Stanford in the final. Florida State prevailed 5–1 and won their fourth overall title, all of which have come since 2014. Stanford's 36 game streak of allowing one or fewer goals was snapped and this was the first match where the Cardinal allowed five or more goals in a game since 1996. This was the first national championship match between two undefeated teams and Florida State became the first undefeated champion since Stanford in 2011.

== Changes from 2022 ==
=== Coaching changes ===
There were 33 coaching changes during the 2022–23 offseason.

Program	Outgoing coach	Manner of departure	Date of vacancy	Incoming coach	Date of appointment	References
Abilene Christian	Casey Wilson	Not Retained	October 31, 2022	Stephen Salas	December 20, 2022	
Alcorn State	Kevin Larry	None provided	—	Jenna Wallace	April 18, 2023	
Belmont	Heather Henson	Not Retained	November 10, 2022	Kelsey Fenix	December 22, 2022	
Cal State Bakersfield	Sebastian Vecchio	Resigned	May 11, 2023	Bernardo Silva	July 5, 2023	
Cincinnati	Niel Stafford	Fired	November 14, 2022	Erica Demers	December 7, 2022	
Coastal Carolina	Paul Hogan	Resigned	October 28, 2022	Jo Chubb	December 20, 2022	
Dartmouth	Ron Rainey	Contract not renewed	November 6, 2022	Taylor Schram	December 15, 2022	
Davidson	Adam Denton	Resigned, accepted head coaching job at Richmond	December 15, 2022	Riley Piechnick	February 9, 2023	
Delaware	Mike Barroqueiro	Resigned	October 24, 2022	Kelly Lawrence	November 14, 2022	
Denver	Jeff Hooker	Not returning	May 1, 2023	Julianne Sitch	June 7, 2023	
Eastern Illinois	Jake Plant	Resigned; accepted head coaching job at Incarnate Word	December 16, 2022	Dirk Bennett	February 10, 2023	
Gardner–Webb	Mike Varga	Resigned; accepted head coaching job at UT Martin	June 5, 2023	Tina Murphy	July 14, 2023	
Incarnate Word	Marc Verriere (interim)	Interim term ended	December 22, 2022	Jake Plant	December 22, 2022	
Indiana State	Julie Hanley	Stepped down	December 2, 2022	Paul Lawrence	March 24, 2023	
Jacksonville State	Neil Macdonald	Contract not renewed	October 24, 2022	Sean Fraser	December 8, 2022	
Louisiana–Monroe	Sean Frasier	Resigned; accepted head coaching job at Jacksonville State	December 8, 2022	Will Roberts	March 14, 2023	
Marist	Brittany Kolmel	Resigned	December 2, 2022	Nicole Pacapelli	January 17, 2023	
Mississippi Valley State	Frank Davies	None Provided	—	Kayleigh Lambrechts	January 13, 2023	
Nevada	Erin Otagaki	Fired	November 7, 2022	Vanessa Valentine	November 22, 2022	
Northwestern State	Stuart Gore	Resigned; accepted head coaching job at Troy	January 4, 2023	Ian Brophy	February 23, 2023	
Oklahoma	Mark Carr	Fired	April 17, 2023	Matt Mott	April 20, 2023	
Ole Miss	Matt Mott	Resigned; accepted head coaching job at Oklahoma	April 20, 2033	Molly Rouse	May 18, 2023	
Prairie View A&M	Christiane Lessa	None provided	—	Abe Garcia	August 2, 2023	
Richmond	Marty Beall	Contract not renewed	October 27, 2022	Adam Denton	December 15, 2022	
Southern Illinois	Craig Roberts	Fired	April 4, 2023	Graeme Orr	May 30, 2023	
St. Bonaventure	Steve Bdarski	Fired	November 1, 2022	Donny George	January 5, 2023	
Toledo	T.J. Buchholz	Fired	October 28, 2022	Mark Batman	December 19, 2022	
Troy	Robert Lane	Resigned	October 31, 2022	Stuart Gore	January 4, 2023	
UAB	Erica Demers	Resigned; accepted head coaching job at Cincinnati	December 7, 2022	Lisa Mann	January 18, 2023	
UMBC	Vanessa Mann	Accepted position with Oregon Youth Soccer	October 17, 2022	Rick Stainton	December 14, 2022	
UT Martin	Phil McNamara	Resigned	May 19, 2023	Mike Varga	June 5, 2023	
Utah Tech	Molly Rouse	Resigned; accepted head coaching job at Ole Miss	May 18, 2023	Lexi Brown	June 26, 2023	
UTEP	Kathryn Balogun	Not Retained	November 1, 2022	Gibbs Keaton	December 7, 2022	
Wofford	Emily Grant	None provided	—	Elissa Post	May 24, 2023	

=== Conference realignment ===
School	Previous conference	New conference
BYU	WCC	Big 12
Campbell	Big South	CAA
Cincinnati	American	Big 12
Charlotte	C-USA	American
Florida Atlantic	C-USA	American
Houston	American	Big 12
Liberty	ASUN	C-USA
Jacksonville State	ASUN	C-USA
New Mexico State	WAC	C-USA
North Texas	C-USA	American
Rice	C-USA	American
Sam Houston	WAC	C-USA
St. Francis Brooklyn	NEC	None (dropped athletics)
UAB	C-USA	American
UCF	American	Big 12
UTSA	C-USA	American
Western Illinois	Summit	OVC

The 2023 season was the last for at least 18 teams in their current conferences.

School	Current conference	Future conference
Arizona	Pac-12	Big 12
Arizona State	Pac-12	Big 12
California	Pac-12	ACC
Colorado	Pac-12	Big 12
Kennesaw State	ASUN	C-USA
Merrimack	NEC	MAAC
Oklahoma	Big 12	SEC
Oregon	Pac-12	Big Ten
Oregon State	Pac-12 (Note: The Pac-12 will technically remain in operation as a two-member conference through 2025–26, but Oregon State and Washington State have made arrangements to house most of their sports in the West Coast Conference until that time.)	WCC
Sacred Heart	NEC	MAAC
SMU	American	ACC
Stanford	Pac-12	ACC
Texas	Big 12	SEC
UCLA	Pac-12	Big Ten
USC	Pac-12	Big Ten
Utah	Pac-12	Big 12
Washington	Pac-12	Big Ten
Washington State	Pac-12	WCC

=== Other headlines ===
- August 12, 2022 – The Indiana University and Purdue University systems announced that Indiana University–Purdue University Indianapolis will be dissolved in 2024 and replaced by separate IU- and Purdue-affiliated institutions. The current athletic program, the IUPUI Jaguars, will transfer to the new IU Indianapolis.
- October 14, 2022 – Conference USA announced that ASUN Conference member Kennesaw State would join C-USA in 2024.
- July 20, 2023 – The Colonial Athletic Association announced a name change to Coastal Athletic Association.
- October 4, 2023 – The Division I Council approved changes to the transfer window for all sports. In fall sports other than football, including men's and women's soccer, the transfer portal now opens for a total of 45 days. A 30-day fall window opens 7 days after championship selections are made, followed by a spring window from May 1–15.
- October 23 – The Metro Atlantic Athletic Conference (MAAC) announced that Merrimack and Sacred Heart would join from the Northeast Conference in July 2024.

== Rankings ==
=== Preseason polls ===
United Soccer Coaches
Rank	Team
1	UCLA (8)
2	North Carolina
3	Notre Dame
4	Duke
5	Virginia
6	Florida State
7	Alabama
8	Arkansas
9	TCU
10	Penn State
11	Stanford
12	South Carolina
13	BYU
14	Pittsburgh
15	Texas
16	Georgetown
17	Michigan State
18	Northwestern
19	Santa Clara
20	Memphis
21	Saint Louis
22	USC
23	Harvard
24	UCF
25	Clemson

Top Drawer Soccer
Rank	Team
1	UCLA
2	North Carolina
3	Florida State
4	Stanford
5	Penn State
6	Virginia
7	Notre Dame
8	Duke
9	Alabama
10	Arkansas
11	South Carolina
12	BYU
13	Texas
14	TCU
15	Pittsburgh
16	Northwestern
17	Saint Louis
18	Brown
19	Michigan State
20	Georgetown
21	Santa Clara
22	Harvard
23	Memphis
24	Georgia
25	USC

== Regular season ==
=== Major upsets ===
In this list, a "major upset" is defined as a game won by a team ranked 10 or more spots lower or an unranked team that defeats a team ranked No. 15 or higher.

All rankings are from the United Soccer Coaches Poll.

Date	Winner	Score	Loser
August 24	LSU	3–1	No. 9 Texas
August 24	No. 24 USC	3–1	No. 4 Duke
August 27	Colorado	2–0	No. 14 Michigan State
September 7	Saint Mary's	1–0	No. 15 Washington State
September 7	Michigan	1–0	No. 11 Notre Dame
September 14	Princeton	3–2	No. 10 Georgetown
September 16	Utah State	1–0	No. 1 BYU
September 21	San Francisco	3–0	No. 13 Santa Clara
September 21	No. 25 Texas Tech	2–1	No. 14т Texas
September 29	Kentucky	2–1	No. 9 Alabama
September 30	Brown	2–1	No. 13 Princeton
October 7	Michigan State	3–2	No. 14 Michigan
October 8	Auburn	2–1	No. 6 Arkansas
October 15	Ohio State	1–0	No. 12 Wisconsin
October 18	San Francisco	1–0	No. 13 Santa Clara
October 19	No. 24 Arizona State	1–0	No. 11 USC
October 22	No. 21 Wisconsin	1–0	No. 4 Penn State
October 29	Gonzaga	1–0	No. 15 Santa Clara
October 29	Iowa	2–1	No. 12 Michigan State
October 29	No. 20 Pittsburgh	2–1 ^{(2OT)}	No. 3 North Carolina
November 1	Texas	1–0	No. 4 Texas Tech
November 3	Columbia	2–1 ^{(2OT)}	No. 14 Brown
November 4	Texas	3–1	No. 6 BYU
November 5	Georgia	1–0	No. 10 Arkansas
November 5	Iowa	1–0	No. 12 Wisconsin
November 10	UC Irvine	1–0	No. 2 UCLA
November 17	Texas	2–1	No. 12 Wisconsin

=== Conference standings ===
2023 American Athletic Conference women's soccer standings
	Conf.						Overall
Team	W		L		T	PCT	W		L		T	PCT
East
South Florida ‍‍‍	6	–	1	–	2	.778	10	–	6	–	2	.611
East Carolina ‍‍‍	4	–	2	–	3	.611	9	–	5	–	5	.605
Charlotte ‍‍‍	4	–	3	–	2	.556	9	–	7	–	4	.550
Florida Atlantic ‍‍‍	3	–	3	–	3	.500	8	–	7	–	5	.525
UAB ‍‍‍	2	–	3	–	4	.444	6	–	7	–	5	.472
Temple ‍‍‍	0	–	9	–	0	.000	2	–	13	–	3	.194
West
No. 10 Memphis ‍†‍‡‍^{y}	9	–	0	–	0	1.000	20	–	2	–	0	.909
SMU ‍‍‍	5	–	3	–	1	.611	11	–	6	–	1	.639
Tulsa ‍‍‍	3	–	2	–	4	.556	5	–	9	–	5	.395
North Texas ‍‍‍	2	–	4	–	3	.389	8	–	5	–	3	.594
UTSA ‍‍‍	2	–	4	–	3	.389	7	–	7	–	4	.500
Rice ‍‍‍	1	–	7	–	1	.167	3	–	13	–	2	.222
† – Conference champion ‡ – 2023 AAC Tournament champion y – Invited to the NCAA Tournament; As of December 5, 2023; Rankings from United Soccer Coaches Poll; Source: American Athletic Conference

2023 America East Conference women's soccer standings
	Conf.						Overall
Team	W		L		T	PCT	W		L		T	PCT
Binghamton ‍†‍‍	5	–	0	–	3	.813	6	–	5	–	6	.529
Maine ‍‍‡‍^{y}	4	–	1	–	3	.688	11	–	2	–	6	.737
New Hampshire ‍‍‍	3	–	1	–	4	.625	6	–	5	–	5	.531
UMass Lowell ‍‍‍	3	–	2	–	3	.563	5	–	6	–	7	.472
NJIT ‍‍‍	3	–	4	–	1	.438	7	–	7	–	5	.500
Vermont ‍‍‍	3	–	4	–	1	.438	10	–	7	–	1	.583
Bryant ‍‍‍	2	–	3	–	3	.438	7	–	5	–	4	.563
Albany ‍‍‍	1	–	5	–	2	.250	4	–	10	–	2	.313
UMBC ‍‍‍	0	–	4	–	4	.250	3	–	11	–	4	.278
† – Conference champion ‡ – 2023 America East Tournament champion y – Invited to the NCAA Tournament; As of December 5, 2023; Rankings from United Soccer Coaches Poll; Source: America East Conference

2023 Atlantic 10 Conference women's soccer standings
	Conf.						Overall
Team	W		L		T	PCT	W		L		T	PCT
No. 11 Saint Louis ‍†‍‡‍^{y}	9	–	0	–	1	.950	19	–	3	–	2	.833
La Salle ‍‍‍	8	–	1	–	1	.850	12	–	6	–	3	.643
Dayton ‍‍‍	7	–	0	–	3	.850	13	–	2	–	5	.775
UMass ‍‍‍	6	–	2	–	2	.700	9	–	5	–	4	.611
Duquesne ‍‍‍	4	–	2	–	4	.600	8	–	8	–	4	.500
Rhode Island ‍‍‍	4	–	3	–	3	.550	4	–	9	–	6	.368
Saint Joseph's ‍‍‍	4	–	3	–	3	.550	4	–	9	–	6	.368
VCU ‍‍‍	4	–	4	–	2	.500	5	–	9	–	4	.389
Loyola Chicago ‍‍‍	3	–	3	–	4	.500	7	–	7	–	4	.500
Fordham ‍‍‍	2	–	5	–	3	.350	4	–	10	–	4	.333
George Mason ‍‍‍	3	–	7	–	0	.300	3	–	15	–	0	.167
St. Bonaventure ‍‍‍	2	–	6	–	2	.300	3	–	8	–	6	.353
Davidson ‍‍‍	1	–	7	–	2	.200	4	–	11	–	2	.294
George Washington ‍‍‍	1	–	8	–	1	.150	4	–	11	–	3	.306
Richmond ‍‍‍	1	–	8	–	1	.150	3	–	11	–	4	.278
† – Conference champion ‡ – 2023 Atlantic 10 Tournament champion y – Invited to the NCAA Tournament; As of December 7, 2023; Rankings from United Soccer Coaches Poll; Source: A10 Conference

2023 ASUN Conference women's soccer standings
	Conf.						Overall
Team	W		L		T	PCT	W		L		T	PCT
Lipscomb ‍†‍‍	10	–	0	–	1	.955	14	–	5	–	1	.725
Central Arkansas ‍‍‍	7	–	1	–	3	.773	8	–	7	–	5	.525
Florida Gulf Coast ‍‍‡‍^{y}	7	–	1	–	3	.773	12	–	5	–	5	.659
North Alabama ‍‍‍	5	–	3	–	3	.591	11	–	5	–	6	.636
Eastern Kentucky ‍‍‍	4	–	3	–	4	.545	5	–	8	–	6	.421
Queens ‍‍‍	2	–	3	–	6	.455	4	–	7	–	8	.421
Austin Peay ‍‍‍	3	–	5	–	3	.409	5	–	11	–	5	.357
Kennesaw State ‍‍‍	3	–	5	–	3	.409	4	–	8	–	7	.395
Stetson ‍‍‍	3	–	6	–	2	.364	3	–	12	–	3	.250
North Florida ‍‍‍	2	–	6	–	3	.318	4	–	9	–	5	.361
Bellarmine ‍‍‍	1	–	7	–	3	.227	4	–	9	–	5	.361
Jacksonville ‍‍‍	1	–	8	–	2	.182	3	–	11	–	4	.278
† – Conference champion ‡ – 2023 ASUN Tournament champion y – Invited to the NCAA Tournament; As of December 5, 2023; Rankings from United Soccer Coaches Poll; Source: Atlantic Sun Conference

2023 ACC women's soccer standings
	Conf.						Overall
Team	W		L		T	PCT	W		L		T	PCT
No. 1 Florida State ‍†‍‡‍^{y}	9	–	0	–	1	.950	22	–	0	–	1	.978
No. 16 Notre Dame ‍‍‍^{y}	7	–	1	–	2	.800	12	–	4	–	4	.700
No. 3 Clemson ‍‍‍^{y}	7	–	2	–	1	.750	18	–	4	–	4	.769
No. 8 North Carolina ‍‍‍^{y}	5	–	0	–	5	.750	13	–	2	–	8	.739
No. 6 Pittsburgh ‍‍‍^{y}	6	–	3	–	1	.650	17	–	6	–	1	.729
Wake Forest ‍‍‍	4	–	2	–	4	.600	10	–	3	–	5	.694
Virginia ‍‍‍	3	–	3	–	4	.500	8	–	3	–	6	.647
Virginia Tech ‍‍‍	4	–	6	–	0	.400	7	–	8	–	3	.472
Louisville ‍‍‍	3	–	5	–	2	.400	4	–	9	–	5	.361
Duke ‍‍‍	2	–	5	–	3	.350	6	–	7	–	3	.469
NC State ‍‍‍	2	–	5	–	3	.350	3	–	9	–	6	.333
Miami (FL) ‍‍‍	2	–	7	–	1	.250	3	–	10	–	4	.294
Boston College ‍‍‍	0	–	6	–	4	.200	3	–	9	–	6	.333
Syracuse ‍‍‍	0	–	9	–	1	.050	2	–	14	–	2	.167
† – Conference champion ‡ – 2023 ACC Tournament champion y – Invited to the NCAA Tournament; Source: The ACC; As of December 5, 2023; Rankings from United Soccer Coaches Poll

2023 Big East Conference women's soccer standings
	Conf.						Overall
Team	W		L		T	PCT	W		L		T	PCT
Xavier ‍†‍‍^{y}	6	–	0	–	4	.800	14	–	4	–	4	.727
Georgetown ‍†‍‡‍^{y}	6	–	0	–	4	.800	13	–	2	–	7	.750
UConn ‍‍‍	6	–	1	–	3	.750	10	–	4	–	5	.658
Providence ‍‍‍^{y}	4	–	1	–	5	.650	10	–	8	–	5	.543
St. John's ‍‍‍	5	–	4	–	1	.550	10	–	6	–	3	.605
Butler ‍‍‍	2	–	3	–	5	.450	6	–	8	–	6	.450
Seton Hall ‍‍‍	2	–	4	–	4	.400	6	–	7	–	5	.472
DePaul ‍‍‍	2	–	5	–	3	.350	6	–	7	–	4	.471
Marquette ‍‍‍	2	–	6	–	2	.300	5	–	10	–	4	.368
Creighton ‍‍‍	2	–	7	–	1	.250	4	–	9	–	5	.361
Villanova ‍‍‍	1	–	7	–	2	.200	4	–	7	–	7	.417
† – Conference champion ‡ – 2023 Big East Tournament champion y – Invited to the NCAA Tournament; As of December 5, 2023; Rankings from United Soccer Coaches Poll; Source: The Big East Conference

2023 Big Sky Conference women's soccer standings
	Conf.						Overall
Team	W		L		T	PCT	W		L		T	PCT
Montana ‍†‍‍	7	–	0	–	1	.938	13	–	3	–	3	.763
Idaho ‍‍‡‍^{y}	5	–	2	–	1	.688	12	–	5	–	2	.684
Portland State ‍‍‍	4	–	2	–	2	.625	8	–	8	–	2	.500
Northern Arizona ‍‍‍	4	–	3	–	1	.563	11	–	6	–	3	.625
Sacramento State ‍‍‍	2	–	3	–	3	.438	4	–	9	–	5	.361
Idaho State ‍‍‍	2	–	4	–	2	.375	4	–	13	–	2	.263
Weber State ‍‍‍	1	–	3	–	4	.375	1	–	9	–	5	.233
Northern Colorado ‍‍‍	1	–	4	–	3	.313	1	–	13	–	4	.167
Eastern Washington ‍‍‍	1	–	6	–	1	.188	2	–	14	–	1	.147
† – Conference champion ‡ – 2023 Big Sky Tournament champion y – Invited to the NCAA Tournament; As of December 5, 2023; Rankings from United Soccer Coaches Poll; Source: The Big Sky Conference

2023 Big South Conference women's soccer standings
	Conf.						Overall
Team	W		L		T	PCT	W		L		T	PCT
Radford ‍†‍‡‍^{y}	6	–	1	–	1	.813	12	–	6	–	2	.650
USC Upstate ‍‍‍	6	–	2	–	0	.750	11	–	4	–	4	.684
High Point ‍‍‍	4	–	1	–	3	.688	6	–	5	–	7	.528
Charleston Southern ‍‍‍	4	–	2	–	2	.625	9	–	5	–	4	.611
Longwood ‍‍‍	3	–	2	–	3	.563	5	–	7	–	5	.441
Presbyterian ‍‍‍	2	–	4	–	2	.375	3	–	10	–	3	.281
UNC Asheville ‍‍‍	2	–	5	–	1	.313	7	–	6	–	4	.529
Winthrop ‍‍‍	1	–	6	–	1	.188	4	–	8	–	2	.357
Gardner–Webb ‍‍‍	1	–	6	–	1	.188	4	–	12	–	2	.278
† – Conference champion ‡ – 2023 Big South Tournament champion y – Invited to the NCAA Tournament; As of December 5, 2023; Rankings from United Soccer Coaches Poll; Source: Big South Conference

2023 Big Ten Conference women's soccer standings
	Conf.						Overall
Team	W		L		T	PCT	W		L		T	PCT
No. 7 Nebraska ‍†‍‍^{y}	7	–	1	–	2	.800	14	–	3	–	3	.775
No. 12 Michigan State ‍†‍‍^{y}	7	–	1	–	2	.800	14	–	4	–	3	.738
No. 19 Wisconsin ‍‍‍^{y}	7	–	2	–	1	.750	14	–	4	–	4	.727
No. 5 Penn State ‍‍‍^{y}	6	–	1	–	3	.750	14	–	2	–	4	.800
Indiana ‍‍‍^{y}	6	–	2	–	2	.700	12	–	4	–	4	.700
Rutgers ‍‍‍^{y}	5	–	4	–	1	.550	9	–	7	–	4	.550
Ohio State ‍‍‍^{y}	5	–	4	–	1	.550	9	–	8	–	3	.525
No. 24 Iowa ‍‍‡‍^{y}	3	–	4	–	3	.450	13	–	4	–	4	.714
Northwestern ‍‍‍	3	–	5	–	2	.400	9	–	5	–	4	.611
Minnesota ‍‍‍	3	–	5	–	2	.400	7	–	6	–	4	.529
Michigan ‍‍‍^{y}	3	–	5	–	2	.400	7	–	7	–	4	.500
Illinois ‍‍‍	2	–	6	–	2	.300	6	–	8	–	3	.441
Purdue ‍‍‍	0	–	8	–	2	.100	3	–	13	–	2	.222
Maryland ‍‍‍	0	–	9	–	1	.050	3	–	10	–	5	.306
† – Conference champion ‡ – 2023 Big Ten Tournament champion y – Invited to the NCAA Tournament; As of December 5, 2023; Rankings from United Soccer Coaches Poll; Source: Big Ten

2023 Big West Conference women's soccer standings
	Conf.						Overall
Team	W		L		T	PCT	W		L		T	PCT
Cal State Fullerton ‍†‍‍	6	–	1	–	3	.750	8	–	5	–	7	.575
UC Davis ‍‍‍	6	–	2	–	2	.700	10	–	7	–	2	.579
Cal Poly ‍‍‍	6	–	3	–	1	.650	10	–	8	–	3	.548
Long Beach State ‍‍‍	5	–	3	–	2	.600	10	–	6	–	4	.600
UC San Diego ‍‍‍	4	–	3	–	3	.550	5	–	8	–	5	.417
No. 20 UC Irvine ‍‍‡‍^{y}	3	–	3	–	4	.500	10	–	8	–	6	.542
Hawaii ‍‍‍	4	–	5	–	1	.450	5	–	8	–	3	.406
Cal State Bakersfield ‍‍‍	2	–	5	–	3	.350	3	–	10	–	4	.294
UC Riverside ‍‍‍	2	–	5	–	3	.350	2	–	10	–	7	.289
UC Santa Barbara ‍‍‍	2	–	6	–	2	.300	4	–	8	–	7	.395
Cal State Northridge ‍‍‍	1	–	5	–	4	.300	1	–	13	–	5	.184
† – Conference champion ‡ – 2023 Big West Tournament champion y – Invited to the NCAA Tournament; As of December 5, 2023; Rankings from United Soccer Coaches Poll; Source: The Big West Conference

2023 Big 12 Conference women's soccer standings
	Conf.						Overall
Team	W		L		T	PCT	W		L		T	PCT
No. 9 Texas Tech ‍†‍‍^{y}	8	–	0	–	2	.900	16	–	2	–	5	.804
No. 4 BYU ‍‍‍^{y}	7	–	0	–	3	.850	20	–	3	–	3	.827
TCU ‍‍‍	6	–	2	–	2	.700	10	–	6	–	3	.605
No. 18 Texas ‍‍‡‍^{y}	6	–	3	–	1	.650	17	–	5	–	2	.750
West Virginia ‍‍‍	5	–	3	–	2	.600	7	–	8	–	4	.474
UCF ‍‍‍	5	–	4	–	1	.550	10	–	7	–	1	.583
Oklahoma State ‍‍‍	5	–	5	–	0	.500	12	–	8	–	0	.600
Baylor ‍‍‍	4	–	4	–	2	.500	9	–	7	–	3	.553
Cincinnati ‍‍‍	2	–	3	–	5	.450	4	–	8	–	7	.395
Oklahoma ‍‍‍	3	–	5	–	2	.400	8	–	10	–	2	.450
Iowa State ‍‍‍	3	–	7	–	0	.300	6	–	11	–	1	.361
Houston ‍‍‍	2	–	7	–	1	.250	8	–	8	–	2	.500
Kansas ‍‍‍	1	–	7	–	2	.200	4	–	8	–	6	.389
Kansas State ‍‍‍	1	–	8	–	1	.150	3	–	12	–	3	.250
† – Conference champion ‡ – 2023 Big 12 Tournament champion y – Invited to the NCAA Tournament; As of December 5, 2023; Rankings from United Soccer Coaches Poll; Source: The Big 12 Conference

2023 Coastal Athletic Association women's soccer standings
	Conf.						Overall
Team	W		L		T	PCT	W		L		T	PCT
Towson ‍†‍‡‍^{y}	9	–	1	–	2	.833	15	–	3	–	2	.800
Hofstra ‍‍‍	9	–	2	–	1	.792	12	–	5	–	1	.694
Monmouth ‍‍‍	8	–	2	–	2	.750	11	–	6	–	2	.632
Northeastern ‍‍‍	6	–	2	–	4	.667	8	–	4	–	6	.611
William & Mary ‍‍‍	6	–	3	–	3	.625	9	–	4	–	7	.625
Stony Brook ‍‍‍	4	–	4	–	4	.500	6	–	6	–	6	.500
UNC Wilmington ‍‍‍	4	–	5	–	3	.458	5	–	9	–	3	.382
Delaware ‍‍‍	2	–	3	–	7	.458	5	–	5	–	8	.500
Drexel ‍‍‍	3	–	6	–	3	.375	7	–	8	–	3	.472
Campbell ‍‍‍	2	–	4	–	6	.417	4	–	6	–	7	.441
Charleston ‍‍‍	2	–	6	–	4	.333	2	–	10	–	5	.265
Elon ‍‍‍	2	–	7	–	3	.292	3	–	9	–	5	.324
Hampton ‍‍‍	0	–	12	–	0	.000	0	–	18	–	0	.000
† – Conference champion ‡ – 2023 CAA Tournament champion y – Invited to the NCAA Tournament; As of December 5, 2023; Rankings from United Soccer Coaches Poll; Source: Coastal Athletic Association

2023 Conference USA women's soccer standings
	Conf.						Overall
Team	W		L		T	PCT	W		L		T	PCT
New Mexico State ‍†‍‍	6	–	0	–	2	.875	10	–	6	–	3	.605
Liberty ‍‍‡‍^{y}	5	–	2	–	1	.688	16	–	3	–	1	.825
Western Kentucky ‍‍‍	4	–	2	–	2	.625	6	–	5	–	7	.528
FIU ‍‍‍	3	–	2	–	3	.563	8	–	6	–	4	.556
Sam Houston ‍‍‍	3	–	3	–	2	.500	6	–	7	–	4	.471
Louisiana Tech ‍‍‍	2	–	4	–	2	.375	6	–	11	–	3	.375
Middle Tennessee ‍‍‍	2	–	5	–	1	.313	6	–	9	–	3	.417
UTEP ‍‍‍	1	–	4	–	3	.313	2	–	11	–	4	.235
Jacksonville State ‍‍‍	1	–	5	–	2	.250	6	–	9	–	2	.412
† – Conference champion ‡ – 2023 C-USA Tournament champion y – Invited to the NCAA Tournament; As of December 5, 2023; Rankings from United Soccer Coaches Poll; Source: Conference USA

2023 Horizon League women's soccer standings
	Conf.						Overall
Team	W		L		T	PCT	W		L		T	PCT
Milwaukee ‍†‍‡‍^{y}	7	–	0	–	3	.850	12	–	3	–	5	.725
IUPUI ‍‍‍	5	–	1	–	4	.700	11	–	3	–	5	.711
Northern Kentucky ‍‍‍	4	–	2	–	4	.600	8	–	3	–	8	.632
Robert Morris ‍‍‍	5	–	4	–	1	.550	12	–	5	–	3	.675
Wright State ‍‍‍	4	–	3	–	3	.550	6	–	7	–	5	.472
Detroit Mercy ‍‍‍	5	–	5	–	0	.500	7	–	9	–	3	.447
Oakland ‍‍‍	3	–	2	–	5	.550	5	–	6	–	7	.472
Youngstown State ‍‍‍	3	–	5	–	2	.400	7	–	7	–	3	.500
Purdue Fort Wayne ‍‍‍	2	–	4	–	4	.400	5	–	7	–	6	.444
Cleveland State ‍‍‍	1	–	6	–	3	.250	4	–	10	–	3	.324
Green Bay ‍‍‍	0	–	7	–	3	.150	0	–	11	–	5	.156
† – Conference champion ‡ – 2023 Horizon League Tournament champion y – Invited to the NCAA Tournament; As of December 5, 2023; Rankings from United Soccer Coaches Poll; Source: Horizon League

2023 Ivy League women's soccer standings
	Conf.						Overall
Team	W		L		T	PCT	W		L		T	PCT
Brown ‍†‍‍^{y}	7	–	0	–	0	1.000	12	–	3	–	2	.765
Harvard ‍‍‡‍^{y}	5	–	1	–	1	.786	13	–	4	–	2	.737
Princeton ‍‍‍^{y}	4	–	2	–	1	.643	10	–	5	–	4	.632
Columbia ‍‍‍^{y}	3	–	2	–	2	.571	11	–	5	–	3	.658
Dartmouth ‍‍‍	2	–	3	–	2	.429	7	–	3	–	5	.633
Penn ‍‍‍	1	–	4	–	2	.286	6	–	7	–	3	.469
Yale ‍‍‍	0	–	5	–	2	.143	5	–	6	–	5	.469
Cornell ‍‍‍	0	–	5	–	2	.143	4	–	5	–	6	.467
† – Conference champion ‡ – 2023 Ivy League Tournament champion y – Invited to the NCAA Tournament; As of December 5, 2023; Rankings from United Soccer Coaches Poll; Source: Ivy League

2023 Mid-American Conference women's soccer standings
	Conf.						Overall
Team	W		L		T	PCT	W		L		T	PCT
Western Michigan ‍†‍‍	8	–	0	–	3	.864	12	–	4	–	3	.711
Bowling Green ‍‍‍	8	–	1	–	2	.818	10	–	6	–	2	.611
Ball State ‍‍‍	6	–	2	–	3	.682	8	–	8	–	3	.500
Kent State ‍‍‍	7	–	4	–	0	.636	11	–	6	–	2	.632
Northern Illinois ‍‍‍	6	–	4	–	1	.591	8	–	8	–	3	.500
Buffalo ‍‍‍	4	–	4	–	3	.500	7	–	5	–	6	.556
Ohio ‍‍‡‍^{y}	4	–	4	–	3	.500	8	–	8	–	5	.500
Miami (OH) ‍‍‍	5	–	6	–	0	.455	8	–	10	–	1	.447
Toledo ‍‍‍	4	–	6	–	1	.409	7	–	9	–	2	.444
Central Michigan ‍‍‍	1	–	7	–	3	.227	2	–	8	–	6	.313
Eastern Michigan ‍‍‍	1	–	8	–	2	.182	1	–	12	–	6	.211
Akron ‍‍‍	1	–	9	–	1	.136	3	–	14	–	1	.194
† – Conference champion ‡ – 2023 MAC Tournament champion y – Invited to the NCAA Tournament; As of December 5, 2023; Rankings from United Soccer Coaches Poll; Source: Mid-American Conference

2023 MAAC women's soccer standings
	Conf.						Overall
Team	W		L		T	PCT	W		L		T	PCT
Quinnipiac ‍†‍‡‍^{y}	9	–	0	–	1	.950	13	–	4	–	1	.750
Fairfield ‍‍‍	7	–	2	–	1	.750	10	–	6	–	4	.600
Canisius ‍‍‍	6	–	2	–	2	.700	9	–	4	–	5	.639
Mount St. Mary's ‍‍‍	5	–	4	–	1	.550	7	–	9	–	3	.447
Niagara ‍‍‍	4	–	4	–	2	.500	5	–	10	–	3	.361
Rider ‍‍‍	4	–	5	–	1	.450	7	–	9	–	2	.444
Manhattan ‍‍‍	3	–	4	–	3	.450	4	–	7	–	4	.400
Siena ‍‍‍	3	–	4	–	3	.450	4	–	9	–	4	.353
Marist ‍‍‍	2	–	5	–	3	.350	2	–	9	–	5	.281
Saint Peter's ‍‍‍	2	–	8	–	0	.200	4	–	11	–	0	.267
Iona ‍‍‍	0	–	7	–	3	.150	1	–	15	–	3	.132
† – Conference champion ‡ – 2023 MAAC Tournament champion y – Invited to the NCAA Tournament; As of December 5, 2023; Rankings from United Soccer Coaches Poll; Source: MAAC

2023 Missouri Valley Conference women's soccer standings
	Conf.						Overall
Team	W		L		T	PCT	W		L		T	PCT
Drake ‍†‍‍	8	–	1	–	1	.850	13	–	4	–	3	.725
Missouri State ‍‍‍	7	–	0	–	3	.850	12	–	2	–	5	.763
Northern Iowa ‍‍‍	6	–	4	–	0	.600	13	–	5	–	1	.711
UIC ‍‍‍	5	–	3	–	2	.600	6	–	8	–	5	.447
Murray State ‍‍‍	3	–	2	–	5	.550	6	–	8	–	6	.450
Valparaiso ‍‍‡‍^{y}	3	–	3	–	4	.500	11	–	6	–	6	.609
Belmont ‍‍‍	2	–	3	–	5	.450	3	–	9	–	7	.342
Evansville ‍‍‍	1	–	3	–	6	.400	1	–	7	–	9	.324
Indiana State ‍‍‍	1	–	4	–	5	.350	2	–	6	–	10	.389
Illinois State ‍‍‍	1	–	6	–	3	.250	3	–	9	–	4	.313
Southern Illinois ‍‍‍	0	–	8	–	2	.100	1	–	11	–	5	.206
† – Conference champion ‡ – 2023 Missouri Valley Tournament champion y – Invited to the NCAA Tournament; As of December 5, 2023; Rankings from United Soccer Coaches Poll; Source: Missouri Valley Conference

2023 Mountain West Conference women's soccer standings
	Conf.						Overall
Team	W		L		T	PCT	W		L		T	PCT
San Diego State ‍†‍‍	9	–	1	–	1	.864	14	–	3	–	3	.775
Utah State ‍‍‡‍^{y}	9	–	2	–	0	.818	14	–	8	–	1	.630
Boise State ‍‍‍	8	–	2	–	1	.773	11	–	3	–	6	.700
Colorado State ‍‍‍	6	–	3	–	2	.636	12	–	6	–	4	.636
Fresno State ‍‍‍	4	–	4	–	3	.500	5	–	9	–	6	.400
Nevada ‍‍‍	4	–	6	–	1	.409	6	–	10	–	5	.405
UNLV ‍‍‍	3	–	5	–	3	.409	7	–	7	–	6	.500
Air Force ‍‍‍	3	–	5	–	3	.409	6	–	9	–	3	.417
New Mexico ‍‍‍	2	–	5	–	4	.364	5	–	6	–	6	.471
Colorado College ‍‍‍	3	–	7	–	1	.318	3	–	13	–	2	.222
Wyoming ‍‍‍	2	–	7	–	2	.273	6	–	8	–	5	.447
San Jose State ‍‍‍	1	–	7	–	3	.227	3	–	10	–	6	.316
† – Conference champion ‡ – 2023 MW Tournament champion y – Invited to the NCAA Tournament; As of December 5, 2023; Rankings from United Soccer Coaches Poll; Source: Mountain West Conference

2023 Northeast Conference women's soccer standings
	Conf.						Overall
Team	W		L		T	PCT	W		L		T	PCT
Merrimack ‍†‍‍	8	–	1	–	1	.850	10	–	4	–	4	.667
Central Connecticut ‍‍‡‍^{y}	7	–	0	–	3	.850	10	–	5	–	5	.625
Fairleigh Dickinson ‍‍‍	8	–	2	–	0	.800	8	–	11	–	0	.421
Howard ‍‍‍	6	–	3	–	1	.650	12	–	6	–	2	.650
Sacred Heart ‍‍‍	5	–	4	–	1	.550	6	–	9	–	4	.421
Wagner ‍‍‍	5	–	5	–	0	.500	8	–	8	–	4	.500
Saint Francis (PA) ‍‍‍	3	–	5	–	2	.400	3	–	12	–	2	.235
LIU ‍‍‍	3	–	6	–	1	.350	7	–	8	–	2	.471
Stonehill ‍‍‍	2	–	6	–	2	.300	2	–	13	–	3	.194
Le Moyne ‍‍‍	1	–	7	–	2	.200	2	–	12	–	4	.222
Delaware State ‍‍‍	0	–	9	–	1	.050	0	–	15	–	1	.031
† – Conference champion ‡ – 2023 NEC Tournament champion y – Invited to the NCAA Tournament; As of December 5, 2023; Rankings from United Soccer Coaches Poll; Source: Northeast Conference

2023 Ohio Valley Conference women's soccer standings
	Conf.						Overall
Team	W		L		T	PCT	W		L		T	PCT
Tennessee Tech ‍†‍‍	7	–	1	–	1	.833	9	–	6	–	4	.579
Morehead State ‍‍‡‍^{y}	6	–	1	–	2	.778	9	–	6	–	5	.575
SIU Edwardsville ‍‍‍	3	–	2	–	4	.556	5	–	6	–	6	.471
Southern Indiana ‍‍‍	3	–	2	–	4	.556	4	–	8	–	7	.395
UT Martin ‍‍‍	2	–	2	–	5	.500	5	–	8	–	6	.421
Little Rock ‍‍‍	2	–	3	–	4	.444	7	–	5	–	8	.550
Southeast Missouri State ‍‍‍	2	–	3	–	4	.444	7	–	6	–	6	.526
Eastern Illinois ‍‍‍	3	–	4	–	2	.444	4	–	9	–	4	.353
Western Illinois ‍‍‍	1	–	4	–	4	.333	3	–	8	–	5	.344
Lindenwood ‍‍‍	1	–	8	–	0	.111	3	–	13	–	1	.206
† – Conference champion ‡ – 2023 OVC Tournament champion y – Invited to the NCAA Tournament; As of December 5, 2023; Rankings from United Soccer Coaches Poll; Source: Ohio Valley Conference

2023 Pac-12 Conference women's soccer standings
	Conf.						Overall
Team	W		L		T	PCT	W		L		T	PCT
No. 15 UCLA ‍†‍‍^{y}	10	–	0	–	1	.955	16	–	2	–	1	.868
No. 2 Stanford ‍‍‍^{y}	8	–	0	–	3	.864	20	–	1	–	4	.880
No. 25 USC ‍‍‍^{y}	6	–	2	–	3	.682	11	–	5	–	3	.658
Colorado ‍‍‍^{y}	5	–	3	–	3	.591	13	–	5	–	3	.690
California ‍‍‍	4	–	3	–	4	.545	7	–	6	–	6	.526
Arizona State ‍‍‍^{y}	5	–	5	–	1	.500	10	–	7	–	4	.571
Washington ‍‍‍	4	–	4	–	3	.500	9	–	5	–	5	.605
Arizona ‍‍‍	3	–	6	–	2	.364	6	–	8	–	5	.447
Washington State ‍‍‍	2	–	5	–	4	.364	9	–	6	–	4	.579
Utah ‍‍‍	2	–	6	–	3	.318	6	–	8	–	6	.450
Oregon State ‍‍‍	1	–	6	–	4	.273	4	–	8	–	7	.395
Oregon ‍‍‍	0	–	10	–	1	.045	0	–	16	–	3	.079
† – Conference champion y – Invited to the NCAA Tournament; As of December 5, 2023; Rankings from United Soccer Coaches Poll; Source: Pac 12

2023 Patriot League women's soccer standings
	Conf.						Overall
Team	W		L		T	PCT	W		L		T	PCT
Bucknell ‍‍‡‍^{y}	5	–	1	–	3	.722	12	–	4	–	5	.690
Army ‍†‍‍	6	–	2	–	1	.722	10	–	6	–	4	.600
Loyola (MD) ‍‍‍	6	–	3	–	0	.667	11	–	6	–	0	.647
Boston University ‍‍‍	4	–	3	–	2	.556	7	–	7	–	6	.500
Lehigh ‍‍‍	4	–	4	–	1	.500	7	–	5	–	4	.563
Holy Cross ‍‍‍	2	–	4	–	3	.389	4	–	7	–	5	.406
American ‍‍‍	3	–	5	–	1	.389	3	–	9	–	4	.313
Colgate ‍‍‍	3	–	5	–	1	.389	5	–	13	–	2	.300
Navy ‍‍‍	3	–	6	–	0	.333	9	–	7	–	3	.553
Lafayette ‍‍‍	3	–	6	–	0	.333	7	–	8	–	1	.469
† – Conference champion ‡ – 2023 Patriot League Tournament champion y – Invited to the NCAA Tournament; As of December 5, 2023; Rankings from United Soccer Coaches Poll; Source: Patriot League

2023 SEC women's soccer standings
	Conf.						Overall
Team	W		L		T	PCT	W		L		T	PCT
No. 17 Arkansas ‍†‍‍^{y}	8	–	1	–	1	.850	15	–	5	–	2	.727
No. 21 South Carolina ‍‍‍^{y}	5	–	0	–	5	.750	12	–	3	–	6	.714
No. 14 Mississippi State ‍‍‍^{y}	5	–	3	–	2	.600	12	–	6	–	5	.630
No. 22 Alabama ‍‍‍^{y}	5	–	4	–	1	.550	12	–	5	–	5	.659
No. 13 Georgia ‍‍‡‍^{y}	4	–	3	–	3	.550	13	–	4	–	6	.696
Texas A&M ‍‍‍^{y}	4	–	3	–	3	.550	10	–	8	–	4	.545
Kentucky ‍‍‍	3	–	3	–	4	.500	9	–	4	–	6	.632
Auburn ‍‍‍	3	–	4	–	3	.450	8	–	7	–	5	.525
Tennessee ‍‍‍^{y}	3	–	4	–	3	.450	9	–	7	–	4	.550
LSU ‍‍‍^{y}	3	–	5	–	2	.400	8	–	8	–	4	.500
Vanderbilt ‍‍‍	3	–	5	–	2	.400	8	–	5	–	5	.583
Ole Miss ‍‍‍	3	–	5	–	2	.400	7	–	7	–	3	.500
Florida ‍‍‍	2	–	4	–	4	.400	6	–	5	–	6	.529
Missouri ‍‍‍	1	–	8	–	1	.150	5	–	9	–	3	.382
† – Conference champion ‡ – 2023 SEC Tournament champion y – Invited to the NCAA Tournament; As of November 7, 2023; Rankings from United Soccer Coaches Poll; Source: SEC

2023 Southern Conference women's soccer standings
	Conf.						Overall
Team	W		L		T	PCT	W		L		T	PCT
Western Carolina ‍†‍‡‍^{y}	7	–	2	–	0	.778	13	–	5	–	3	.690
Samford ‍‍‍	6	–	1	–	2	.778	12	–	4	–	5	.690
East Tennessee State ‍‍‍	6	–	1	–	2	.778	11	–	3	–	5	.711
Furman ‍‍‍	3	–	1	–	5	.611	7	–	5	–	7	.553
Mercer ‍‍‍	4	–	4	–	1	.500	10	–	6	–	5	.595
Chattanooga ‍‍‍	4	–	4	–	1	.500	10	–	7	–	1	.583
UNC Greensboro ‍‍‍	4	–	4	–	1	.500	7	–	9	–	3	.447
Wofford ‍‍‍	2	–	5	–	2	.333	5	–	11	–	4	.350
VMI ‍‍‍	1	–	8	–	0	.111	2	–	17	–	0	.105
The Citadel ‍‍‍	0	–	7	–	2	.111	3	–	9	–	6	.333
† – Conference champion ‡ – 2023 SoCON Tournament champion y – Invited to the NCAA Tournament; As of December 5, 2023; Rankings from United Soccer Coaches Poll; Source: SoCon

2023 Southland Conference women's soccer standings
	Conf.						Overall
Team	W		L		T	PCT	W		L		T	PCT
Lamar ‍†‍‡‍^{y}	9	–	0	–	1	.950	15	–	3	–	3	.786
Texas A&M–Commerce* ‍‍‍	7	–	1	–	2	.800	9	–	7	–	3	.553
McNeese ‍‍‍	5	–	3	–	2	.600	9	–	8	–	4	.524
Northwestern State ‍‍‍	4	–	5	–	1	.450	6	–	10	–	3	.395
Texas A&M–Corpus Christi ‍‍‍	4	–	5	–	1	.450	7	–	8	–	4	.474
Southeastern Louisiana ‍‍‍	4	–	5	–	1	.450	6	–	10	–	2	.389
Houston Christian ‍‍‍	4	–	6	–	0	.400	7	–	11	–	0	.389
Incarnate Word ‍‍‍	3	–	6	–	1	.350	6	–	8	–	2	.438
Nicholls ‍‍‍	0	–	9	–	1	.050	1	–	17	–	1	.079
† – Conference champion ‡ – 2023 Southland Tournament champion y – Invited to the NCAA Tournament; Texas A&M–Commerce ineligible for postseason NCAA Championship play due to transition from NCAA Division II; As of December 5, 2023; Rankings from United Soccer Coaches Poll; Source: Southland Conference

2023 SWAC women's soccer standings
	Conf.						Overall
Team	W		L		T	PCT	W		L		T	PCT
Grambling State ‍†‍‡‍^{y}	8	–	0	–	1	.944	15	–	5	–	4	.708
Jackson State ‍‍‍	7	–	2	–	0	.778	10	–	9	–	0	.526
Southern ‍‍‍	5	–	1	–	3	.722	8	–	6	–	4	.556
Texas Southern ‍‍‍	5	–	3	–	1	.611	7	–	13	–	1	.357
Arkansas–Pine Bluff ‍‍‍	4	–	5	–	0	.444	9	–	11	–	1	.452
Alcorn State ‍‍‍	3	–	5	–	1	.389	5	–	11	–	1	.324
Prairie View A&M ‍‍‍	3	–	5	–	1	.389	3	–	12	–	1	.219
Alabama A&M ‍‍‍	3	–	6	–	0	.333	3	–	15	–	0	.167
Alabama State ‍‍‍	1	–	6	–	2	.222	2	–	12	–	3	.206
Mississippi Valley State ‍‍‍	1	–	7	–	1	.167	2	–	11	–	1	.179
† – Conference champion ‡ – 2023 SWAC Tournament champion y – Invited to the NCAA Tournament; As of December 5, 2023; Rankings from United Soccer Coaches Poll; Source: SWAC

2023 Summit League women's soccer standings
	Conf.						Overall
Team	W		L		T	PCT	W		L		T	PCT
Denver ‍†‍‍	5	–	1	–	2	.750	9	–	2	–	7	.694
South Dakota State ‍‍‡‍^{y}	4	–	1	–	3	.688	13	–	4	–	3	.725
Oral Roberts ‍‍‍	4	–	3	–	1	.563	8	–	7	–	4	.526
Omaha ‍‍‍	3	–	1	–	4	.625	7	–	5	–	7	.553
South Dakota ‍‍‍	3	–	4	–	1	.438	7	–	7	–	4	.500
Kansas City ‍‍‍	2	–	3	–	3	.438	3	–	7	–	8	.389
North Dakota State ‍‍‍	1	–	3	–	4	.375	5	–	6	–	6	.471
North Dakota ‍‍‍	1	–	3	–	4	.375	5	–	7	–	6	.444
St. Thomas* ‍‍‍	1	–	5	–	2	.250	3	–	7	–	5	.367
† – Conference champion ‡ – 2023 Summit League tournament champion y – Invited to the NCAA tournament * Ineligible for the 2023 NCAA tournament due to transition from Division III; As of December 5, 2023; Rankings from United Soccer Coaches Poll; Source: Summit League

2023 Sun Belt Conference women's soccer standings
	Conf.						Overall
Team	W		L		T	PCT	W		L		T	PCT
East
Georgia Southern ‍‍‍	7	–	3	–	0	.700	12	–	5	–	1	.694
Appalachian State ‍‍‍	6	–	2	–	2	.700	9	–	6	–	3	.583
Old Dominion ‍‍‡‍^{y}	5	–	2	–	3	.650	14	–	3	–	5	.750
James Madison ‍‍‍^{y}	4	–	1	–	5	.650	9	–	5	–	8	.591
Georgia State ‍‍‍	4	–	3	–	3	.550	9	–	5	–	6	.600
Marshall ‍‍‍	2	–	8	–	0	.200	7	–	9	–	1	.441
Coastal Carolina ‍‍‍	0	–	8	–	2	.100	3	–	12	–	2	.235
West
South Alabama ‍†‍‍	8	–	0	–	2	.900	16	–	1	–	3	.875
Louisiana–Monroe ‍‍‍	4	–	1	–	5	.650	9	–	2	–	8	.684
Texas State ‍‍‍	3	–	3	–	4	.500	9	–	7	–	4	.550
Southern Miss ‍‍‍	3	–	4	–	3	.450	6	–	9	–	3	.417
Louisiana ‍‍‍	4	–	6	–	0	.400	7	–	8	–	2	.471
Arkansas State ‍‍‍	2	–	5	–	3	.350	4	–	8	–	4	.375
Troy ‍‍‍	1	–	7	–	2	.200	6	–	10	–	2	.389
† – Conference champion ‡ – 2023 Sun Belt Tournament champion y – Invited to the NCAA Tournament; As of December 5, 2023; Rankings from United Soccer Coaches Poll; Source: Sun Belt

2023 West Coast Conference women's soccer standings
	Conf.						Overall
Team	W		L		T	PCT	W		L		T	PCT
Gonzaga ‍†‍‍^{y}	6	–	1	–	1	.813	14	–	4	–	2	.750
Pepperdine ‍‍‍^{y}	6	–	2	–	0	.750	9	–	5	–	5	.605
No. 23 Santa Clara ‍‍‍^{y}	6	–	2	–	0	.750	14	–	5	–	2	.714
Portland ‍‍‍	4	–	3	–	1	.563	10	–	4	–	3	.676
Saint Mary's ‍‍‍	4	–	3	–	1	.563	10	–	5	–	3	.639
San Francisco ‍‍‍	3	–	4	–	1	.438	6	–	9	–	3	.417
Pacific ‍‍‍	3	–	5	–	0	.375	9	–	9	–	1	.500
Loyola Marymount ‍‍‍	0	–	5	–	3	.188	6	–	10	–	3	.395
San Diego ‍‍‍	0	–	7	–	1	.063	1	–	15	–	2	.111
† – Conference champion y – Invited to the NCAA Tournament; As of December 5, 2023; Rankings from United Soccer Coaches Poll; Source: West Coast Conference

2023 WAC women's soccer standings
	Conf.						Overall
Team	W		L		T	PCT	W		L		T	PCT
Utah Valley ‍†‍‍	7	–	0	–	2	.889	10	–	4	–	5	.658
California Baptist ‍‍‍	6	–	0	–	3	.833	11	–	2	–	6	.737
Seattle ‍‍‍	6	–	2	–	1	.722	10	–	9	–	2	.524
Grand Canyon ‍‍‡‍^{y}	5	–	1	–	3	.722	14	–	5	–	4	.696
Utah Tech ‍‍‍	3	–	2	–	4	.556	8	–	7	–	5	.525
Southern Utah ‍‍‍	3	–	5	–	1	.389	3	–	11	–	5	.289
Abilene Christian ‍‍‍	2	–	6	–	1	.278	7	–	9	–	2	.444
UT Rio Grande Valley ‍‍‍	1	–	6	–	2	.222	3	–	10	–	4	.294
Stephen F. Austin ‍‍‍	1	–	6	–	2	.222	2	–	14	–	2	.167
Tarleton State ‍‍‍	1	–	7	–	1	.167	4	–	12	–	3	.289
† – Conference champion ‡ – 2023 WAC Tournament champion y – Invited to the NCAA Tournament; As of December 5, 2023; Rankings from United Soccer Coaches Poll; Source: WAC

2023 NCAA Division I independents women's soccer records
	Conf.						Overall
Team	W		L		T	PCT	W		L		T	PCT
Chicago State ‍‍‍	0	–	0	–	0	–	4	–	12	–	0	.250
South Carolina State ‍‍‍	0	–	0	–	0	–	0	–	13	–	1	.036
y – Invited to the NCAA Tournament; As of December 5, 2023; Rankings from United Soccer Coaches Poll

=== Conference winners and tournaments ===
Conference	Regular Season Champion(s)	Tournament Winner	Conference Tournament	Tournament Dates	Tournament Venue (City)
ACC	Florida State		2023 Tournament	October 29 – November 5	First Round: Campus sites, hosted by higher seeds Semifinals and final: WakeMed Soccer Park • Cary, North Carolina
America East	Binghamton	Maine	2023 Tournament	October 29 – November 5	Campus sites, hosted by higher seed
American	Memphis		2023 Tournament	October 31 – November 5	Premier Sports Campus • Lakewood Ranch, Florida
ASUN	Lipscomb	Florida Gulf Coast	2023 Tournament	October 26 – November 5	Campus sites, hosted by higher seed
Atlantic 10	Saint Louis		2023 Tournament	October 27 – November 5	Campus sites, hosted by higher seed
Big 12	Texas Tech	Texas	2023 Tournament	October 28 – November 4	Round Rock Multipurpose Complex • Round Rock, Texas
Big East	Georgetown; Xavier (Note: Top seed in conference tournament.)	Georgetown	2023 Tournament	October 29 – November 5	Quarterfinals: Campus sites, hosted by higher seed Semifinals and final: Maryland SoccerPlex • Boyds, Maryland
Big Sky	Montana	Idaho	2023 Tournament	November 1–5	Lumberjack Stadium • Flagstaff, Arizona
Big South	Radford		2023 Tournament	November 2–5	Sportsplex at Matthews • Matthews, North Carolina
Big Ten	Michigan State; Nebraska	Iowa	2023 Tournament	October 29 – November 5	Quarterfinals: Campus sites, hosted by higher seed Semifinals and final: Lower.com Field • Columbus, Ohio
Big West	Cal State Fullerton	UC Irvine	2023 Tournament	October 29 – November 5	Quarterfinals: Campus sites, hosted by higher seed Semifinals and final: Hosted by regular-season champion
CAA	Towson		2023 Tournament	October 26 – November 5	Quarterfinals and semifinals: Campus sites, hosted by top two seeds Final: Hosted by top remaining seed
C-USA	New Mexico State	Liberty	2023 Tournament	November 2–5	Robert Mack Caruthers Field • Ruston, Louisiana
Horizon	Milwaukee		2023 Tournament	October 29 – November 4	Quarterfinals: Campus sites, hosted by higher seed Semifinals and final: Hosted by regular-season champion
Ivy	Brown	Harvard	2023 Tournament	November 3–5	Stevenson-Pincince Field • Providence, Rhode Island
MAAC	Quinnipiac		2023 Tournament	October 26 – November 5	Campus sites, hosted by higher seed
MAC	Western Michigan	Ohio	2023 Tournament	October 26 – November 5	Campus sites, hosted by higher seed
Missouri Valley	Drake	Valparaiso	2023 Tournament	October 26 – November 5	First Round and Quarterfinals: Campus sites, hosted by higher seed Semifinals and Final: Hosted by #1 seed
Mountain West	San Diego State	Utah State	2023 Tournament	October 29 – November 4	Madrid Sports Complex • Laramie, Wyoming
Northeast	Merrimack	Central Connecticut	2023 Tournament	October 29 – November 5	Campus sites, hosted by higher seed
Ohio Valley	Tennessee Tech	Morehead State	2023 Tournament	October 27 – November 5	Campus sites, hosted by higher seed
Pac-12	UCLA	No Tournament			
Patriot	Army	Bucknell	2023 Tournament	October 29 – November 5	Campus sites, hosted by higher seed
SEC	Arkansas	Georgia	2023 Tournament	October 29 – November 5	Ashton Brosnaham Soccer Complex • Pensacola, Florida
SoCon	Western Carolina		2023 Tournament	October 24 – November 5	Campus sites, hosted by higher seed
Southland	Lamar		2023 Tournament	November 1 – November 5	Dr. Jack Dugan Soccer and Track & Field Stadium • Corpus Christi, Texas
The Summit	Denver	South Dakota State	2023 Tournament	October 27 – November 5	Campus sites, hosted by higher seed
Sun Belt	South Alabama	Old Dominion	2023 Tournament	October 30 – November 5	Foley Sports Tourism Complex • Foley, Alabama
SWAC	Grambling State		2023 Tournament	November 2 – November 5	PVAMU Soccer Complex • Prairie View, Texas
WCC	Gonzaga	No Tournament			
WAC	Utah Valley	Grand Canyon	2023 Tournament	October 29 – November 4	CBU Soccer Stadium • Riverside, California

== Postseason ==
=== Final rankings ===
Rank	United Soccer Coaches	TopDrawerSoccer.com
1	Florida State	Florida State
2	Stanford	Stanford
3	Clemson	Clemson
4	BYU	BYU
5	Penn State	Pittsburgh
6	Pittsburgh	North Carolina
7	Nebraska	Penn State
8	North Carolina	Nebraska
9	Texas Tech	Memphis
10	Memphis	Saint Louis
11	Saint Louis	Texas Tech
12	Michigan State	Texas
13	Georgia	Georgia
14	Mississippi State	Mississippi State
15	UCLA	Michigan State
16	Notre Dame	UC Irvine
17	Arkansas	Notre Dame
18	Texas	Harvard
19	Wisconsin	USC
20	UC Irvine	Brown
21	South Carolina	Iowa
22	Alabama	Georgetown
23	Santa Clara	Arkansas
24	Iowa	Wisconsin
25	USC	Columbia

== Award winners ==
=== All-America teams ===
2023 United Soccer Coaches All-America Teams
First Team	Second Team	Third Team
Madison White, GK, Texas Tech; Hannah Anderson, DF, Texas Tech; Eva Gaetino, DF, Notre Dame; Julia Leas, DF, Georgetown; Lilly Reale, DF, UCLA; Laveni Vaka, DF, BYU; Jasmine Aikey, MF, Stanford; Onyi Echegini, MF, Florida State; Josefine Hasbo, MF, Harvard; Lexi Missimo, MF, Texas; Eleanor Dale, FW, Nebraska; Jordynn Dudley, FW, Florida State; Emily Gaebe, FW, Saint Louis; Brecken Mozingo, FW, BYU; Brittany Raphino, FW, Brown	Halle Mackiewicz, GK, Clemson; Natalie Bain, DF, Xavier; Lyndsey Heckel, DF, Saint Louis; Makenna Morris, DF, Clemson; Kelsey Oyler, DF, Gonzaga; Croix Bethune, MF, Georgia; Cori Dyke, MF, Penn State; Bea Franklin, MF, Arkansas; Jessica Garziano, MF, St. John's; Taylor Huff, MF, Florida State; Jody Brown, FW, Florida State; Trinity Byars, FW, Texas; Nia Christopher, FW, Towson; Abby Kraemer, FW, Maine; Reilyn Turner, FW, UCLA	Cristina Roque, GK, Florida State; Macy Blackburn, DF, Texas Tech; Madison Curry, DF, Princeton; Elise Evans, DF, Stanford; Jade Rose, DF, Harvard; Sam Courtwright, MF, Texas Tech; Jasmine Hamid, MF, Towson; Ally Sentnor, MF, North Carolina; Ece Turkoglu, MF, Old Dominion; Olivia Wade-Katoa, MF, BYU; Catherine Barry, FW, South Carolina; Gianna Gourley, FW, Grand Canyon; Shyra James, FW, Colorado; Chioma Okafor, FW, Connecticut; Avery Patterson, FW, North Carolina; Pietra Tordin, FW, Princeton

=== Major player of the year awards ===
- Hermann Trophy: Onyi Echegini – Florida State
- TopDrawerSoccer.com National Player of the Year Award: Lexi Missimo – Texas

=== Other major awards ===
- United Soccer Coaches College Coach of the Year: Brian Pensky – Florida State
- Bill Jeffrey Award: Becky Burleigh
- Jerry Yeagley Award: Rob Stone
- Mike Berticelli Award: Rob Herringer
- NCAA Tournament MVP: Offensive: Jordynn Dudley Defensive: Lauren Flynn

== Attendances ==
The 40 women's college soccer teams with the highest average home attendance:

#	Football club	Average attendance
1	South Carolina Gamecocks	4,150
2	BYU Cougars	4,036
3	North Carolina Tar Heels	3,029
4	Arkansas Razorbacks	2,344
5	Texas A&M Aggies	2,209
6	Utah Valley Wolverines	2,021
7	Stanford Cardinal	1,835
8	Michigan State Spartans	1,698
9	Virginia Cavaliers	1,618
10	Florida State Seminoles	1,549
11	TCU Horned Frogs	1,547
12	UCLA Bruins	1,477
13	Cal Poly Mustangs	1,366
14	Georgia Bulldogs	1,325
15	Nebraska Cornhuskers	1,323
16	Texas Tech Red Raiders	1,315
17	Washington State Cougars	1,297
18	NC State Wolfpack	1,282
19	Tennessee Volunteers	1,188
20	Duke Blue Devils	1,183
21	Portland Pilots	1,172
22	Clemson Tigers	1,157
23	Michigan Wolverines	1,149
24	Washington Huskies	1,145
25	Oklahoma State Cowboys	1,135
26	Utah Utes	1,116
27	Oklahoma Sooners	1,102
28	Boise State Broncos	1,083
29	UConn Huskies	1,060
30	Penn State Nittany Lions	1,058
31	Rider Broncs	1,031
32	Saint Louis Billikens	1,003
33	Colorado Buffaloes	970
34	Alabama Crimson Tide	931
35	Hawai'i Rainbow Warriors	928
36	Iowa Hawkeyes	924
37	Princeton Tigers	921
38	Mississippi State Bulldogs	920
39	Kentucky Wildcats	904
40	Pittsburgh Panthers	904

== See also ==
- College soccer
- List of NCAA Division I women's soccer programs
- 2023 in American soccer
- 2023 NCAA Division I women's soccer tournament
- 2023 NCAA Division I men's soccer season
