= Ivy Younce =

American-Puerto Rican soccer player (born 2003)

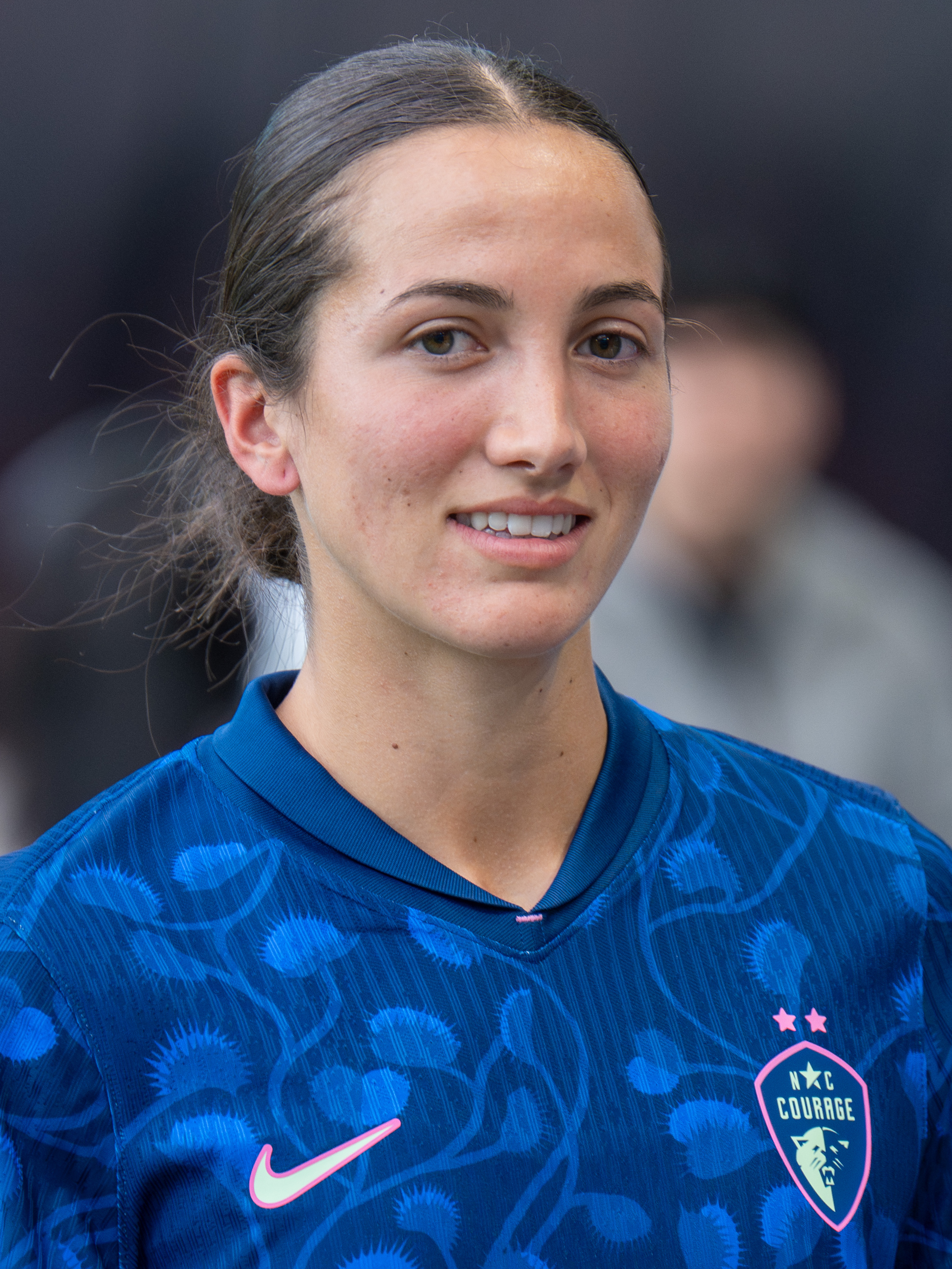
- Younce with the North Carolina Courage in 2026

Personal information
- Birth name: Ivy Chanel Garner
- Date of birth: May 7, 2003 (age 23)
- Height: 5 ft 9 in (1.75 m)
- Positions: Defender; winger

Team information
- Current team: North Carolina Courage
- Number: 6

Youth career
- North Carolina Courage

College career
Years	Team	Apps	(Gls)
2022–2025	Liberty Flames	81	(34)

Senior career*
Years	Team	Apps	(Gls)
2018–2021	Oak City United	–	(–)
2024–2025	North Carolina Courage U23	29	(12)
2026–	North Carolina Courage	8	(0)

International career
2022	Puerto Rico U-20		
- * Club domestic league appearances and goals as of 06:59, November 8, 2026 (UTC)

Ivy Younce (née Garner; born May 7, 2003) is a professional soccer player who plays as a defender for the North Carolina Courage of the National Women's Soccer League (NWSL). Born in the mainland United States, she has represented Puerto Rico at the youth international level. She played college soccer for the Liberty Flames, winning Conference USA Player of the Year honors in 2025.

== Early life ==
Younce grew up in Hillsborough, North Carolina. She played high school soccer at Cedar Ridge High School as a freshman in 2018, leading the team with 18 goals. She was also the top tennis player at the school. After her freshman year, she transferred to Eno River Academy and played club soccer for the North Carolina Courage Academy. She also played for Oak City United in the Women's Premier Soccer League (WPSL). She committed to play college soccer for the NC State Wolfpack late in her junior year. She later de-committed to try out for the North Carolina Tar Heels, but performed poorly at their spring camp, and ended up without offers from either program. She decided to quit soccer and was accepted into Liberty University.

== College career ==
Younce soon found the desire to play soccer again and walked on to the Liberty Flames, with head coach Lang Wedemeyer telling her she "didn't need a tryout" and saying "we already know who you are". She scored 3 goals as a freshman in 2022, being named second-team All-ASUN Conference, as the Flames went undefeated in the conference to win the regular-season title, losing in the ASUN tournament final. She then helped Liberty win the Conference USA tournament in their first season in the conference as a sophomore in 2023. She scored 6 goals and was named first-team All-CUSA for the first of three consecutive seasons.

Younce scored 9 goals in her junior year in 2024, winning a share of the CUSA regular-season title and finishing runner-up in the CUSA tournament. In her senior year in 2025, she exploded for 16 goals (second-most in program history) and was named the CUSA Player of the Year and CUSA Offensive Player of the Year. She had five goals in the CUSA tournament and was named tournament MVP after winning the tournament title for the second time in three years. She scored in seven consecutive games to end her career as the Flames lost in the NCAA tournament first round. Younce was one of the most productive players in Liberty history, scoring 34 goals and tallying 23 assists (both second-most all-time) in 81 games.

While in college, Younce also played for the North Carolina Courage U23 in the USL W League. She helped the Courage become undefeated national champions in 2024, assisting on Macey Bader's goal in the final, and was named in the USL W League Team of the Year. In 2025, she played for the Courage–sponsored team at the Soccer Tournament and helped return to the USL W League final.

== Club career ==
Younce joined the North Carolina Courage first team as a non-roster invitee in the preseason in January 2026. On March 10, the Courage announced that they had signed Younce to her first professional contract on a short-term deal through June. She made her professional debut on May 8, replacing Ashley Sanchez as a late substitute in a 1–0 loss to the Orlando Pride. On June 9, she signed a contract extension with the Courage for the rest of the season.

== International career ==
Younce represented Puerto Rico at the 2022 CONCACAF Women's U-20 Championship, scoring twice as the squad finished fourth and narrowly missed qualifying for the 2022 FIFA U-20 Women's World Cup.

== Personal life ==
Younce is one of six children born to Tom and Punky Garner. Several of her brothers, including Eli Garner, played college soccer. She married Gavin Younce in December 2025.

== Honors and awards ==
Liberty Flames

- Conference USA tournament: 2023, 2025
- Conference USA: 2024, 2025
- ASUN Conference: 2022

North Carolina Courage U23

- USL W League: 2024

Individual

- Conference USA Player of the Year: 2025
- Conference USA Offensive Player of the Year: 2025
- First-team All-Conference USA: 2023, 2024, 2025
- Second-team All-ASUN Conference: 2022
- CUSA tournament Offensive MVP: 2025
- First-team USL W League Team of the Year: 2024
