= 2023 USC Trojans women's soccer team =

American college soccer season

2023 USC Trojans women's soccer
- Conference: Pac-12 Conference
- U. Soc. Coaches poll: No. 24
- TopDrawerSoccer.com: No. 24
- Record: 10-4-3 (6-2-3 Pac-12)
- Head coach: Jane Alukonis (1st season)
- Assistant coaches: Sugar Shinohara (1st season); Ahmad Brown (1st season)
- Home stadium: McAlister Field (Capacity: 1,000)

The 2023 USC Trojans women's soccer team represented the University of Southern California (USC) during the 2023 NCAA Division I women's soccer season.

== Squad ==
=== Roster ===
As of August 2023:

Note: Flags indicate national team as defined under FIFA eligibility rules; some limited exceptions apply. Players may hold more than one non-FIFA nationality.

No.	Pos.	Nation	Player
0	GK	USA	Talia Grossman
00	GK	USA	Emily Rhinehart
1	GK	USA	Anna Smith
2	MF	USA	Jaelyn Eisenhart
3	FW	USA	Kayla Colbert
4	DF	USA	Mary Shin
5	FW	USA	Penelope Hocking
6	FW	USA	Katie Roditis
7	MF	USA	Croix Bethune
7	MF	CAN	Florianne Jourde
8	DF	USA	Brooklyn Courtnall
9	FW	USA	Angeles Escobar
11	FW	JAM	Olufolasade Adamolekun
12	DF	CAN	Zoe Burns
14	GK	USA	Reezyn Turk
15	MF	USA	Alexa Gonzalez

No.	Pos.	Nation	Player
17	FW	USA	Izzy Kimberly
18	FW	USA	Hannah White
20	DF	USA	Kaylin Martin
21	DF	USA	Anuhea Kane
22	MF	BRA	Helena Sampaio
23	DF	USA	Isabel Rolley
24	FW	USA	Savianna Gomez
25	MF	USA	Aaliyah Farmer
26	MF	CAN	Simi Awujo
27	DF	USA	Lily Babalola
28	DF	USA	Morgan Brown
30	FW	USA	Julia Gomez
34	FW	USA	BK Harris
36	DF	USA	Savannah Kessler
80	FW	USA	Simone Jackson

=== Team management ===
Position	Staff
Athletic Director	Jennifer Cohen
Head coach	Jane Alikonis
Assistant Coach	Sugar Shinohara
Assistant Coach	Ahmad Brown
Goalkeepers Coach	Cyrus Mohseni
Director of Operations	Spencer Williams

== Schedule ==
Date Time, TV	Rank^{#}	Opponent^{#}	Result	Record	Site (Attendance) City, State
Exhibition
August 12th 7:00 p.m.	No. 22	at Long Beach State	T 1-1	–	N/A (N/A); Long Beach, California
Non-conference regular season
August 17th 3:00 p.m., P12N	No. 22	at Michigan	W 1-0	1-0-0	McAlister Field (691); Los Angeles, California
August 20th 12:00 p.m., P12N	No. 22	at Georgia		1-0-0	McAlister Field; Los Angeles, California
August 24th 4:00 p.m., ACCNX	No. 24	at No. 4 Duke	W 3-1	2-0-0	Koskinen Stadium; Durham, North Carolina
August 27th 4:00 p.m., ACCNX	No. 24	at No. 3 North Carolina	L 0-4	2-1-0	Dorrance Field (2,869); Chapel Hill, North Carolina
August 31st 3:00 p.m., USC Live Stream	No. 19	at Purdue	W 4-0	3-1-0	McAlister Field (482); Los Angeles, California
September 7th 3:00 p.m., USC Live Stream	No. 19	at Utah Valley	L 2-3	3-2-0	McAlister Field (524); Los Angeles, California
September 14th 3:00 p.m., P12LA		at New Mexico State	W 3-0	4-2-0	McAlister Field (410); Los Angeles, California
Pac-12 Conference Regular season
September 22nd 6:00 p.m., Utah Live Stream-2		at Utah	W 2-0	5-2-0 (1-0-0)	Ute Soccer Field (905); Salt Lake City, Utah
September 28th 5:00 p.m., P12N		at Washington State	W 2-1	6-2-0 (2-0-0)	Lower Soccer Field (1,003); Pullman, Washington
October 1st 1:00 p.m., P12N Washington		at Washington	W 3-0	7-2-0 (3-0-0)	Husky Soccer Stadium (1,597); Seattle, Washington
October 5th 3:00 p.m., P12N		at Oregon	W 3-0	8-2-0 (4-0-0)	McAlister Field (726); Los Angeles, California
October 8th 12:00 p.m., P12NLA		at Oregon State	W 4-0	9-2-0 (5-0-0)	McAlister Field (878); Los Angeles, California
October 14th 12:00 p.m., USC Live Stream		at Colorado	T 1-1	9-2-1 (5-0-1)	McAlister Field (712); Los Angeles, California
October 19th 7:00 p.m., P12N Arizona		at Arizona State	L 0-1	9-3-1 (5-1-1)	Sun Devil Soccer Stadium (668); Tempe, Arizona
October 22nd 1:00 p.m., Arizona Live Stream-2		at Arizona	T 1-1	9-3-2 (5-1-2)	Murphey Field at Mulcahy Soccer Stadium (591); Tucson, Arizona
October 26th 2:00 p.m., P12N		at Stanford	T 0-0	9-3-3 (5-1-3)	McAlister Field (483); Los Angeles, California
October 29th 12:00 p.m., P12NLA		at California	W 2-0	10-3-3 (6-1-3)	McAlister Field (1,088); Los Angeles, California
November 3rd 7:00 p.m., P12NLA		at UCLA; Rivalry	L 2-4	10-4-3 (6-2-3)	Wallis Annenberg Stadium (2,406); Westwood, Los Angeles, California
NCAA tournament
November 10; 2:00 p.m., ESPN+	(8)	at Grand Canyon; First Round			McAlister Field; Los Angeles, California
*Non-conference game. ^{#}Rankings from United Soccer Coaches. (#) Tournament seedings in parentheses. All times are in Pacific.

== Game summaries ==
=== at Long Beach State (Exhibition) ===
August 12th	USC Trojans	1-1	Long Beach State	Long Beach, California
	Goal		Goal

=== vs Michigan ===
August 17th	USC Trojans	1-0	Michigan	Los Angeles, California
3:00 p.m. PST	Simone Jackson 22'	Report		Stadium: McAlister Field; Attendance: 691; Referee: Felix Granados; Assistant referees: Adrian Gonzalez; Abdu razzaq Juma; Fourth official: Blanca Diaz Rodriguez
Note: USC's Season and Home Opener

=== vs Georgia ===
August 20th	USC Trojans	pp	Georgia	Los Angeles, California
12:00 p.m.				Stadium: McAllister Field

=== at No. 4 Duke ===
August 24th	Duke	1-3	USC Trojans	Durham, North Carolina
4:00 p.m.	Kat Rader 12'; Katie Groff (yellow card) 47'	Report	Maribel Flores 36'; Angeles Escobar 62'; Kayla Colbert 77'	Stadium: Koskinen Stadium; Attendance: 803; Referee: Nicole Green; Assistant referees: Kyle Trissel; Ross McKernan; Fourth official: John Matto

=== at No. 3 North Carolina ===
August 27th	North Carolina	4-0	USC Trojans	Chapel Hill, North Carolina
4:00 p.m.	Ally Sentnor 25'; Evelyn Shores 63', 65'; Tori DellaPeruta 87'	Report		Stadium: Dorrance Field; Attendance: 2,869; Referee: Corey Rockwell; Assistant referees: Dallas Rosier; Luis Martinez; Fourth official: Richard Crowgey

=== vs Purdue ===
August 31st	USC Trojans	4-0	Purdue	Los Angeles, California
3:00 p.m.	Hannah Griffin 1'; Kayla Colbert 56'; Helena Sampaio 57'; Katie Roditis 64'	Report		Stadium: McAlister Field; Attendance: 482; Referee: Felix Granados; Assistant referees: Aaron Stein; Amanda Dibiaso; Fourth official: Blanca Diaz Rodriguez
Note: First 300 Fans Receive Free Sunglasses

=== vs Utah Valley ===
September 7th	USC Trojans	2-3	Utah Valley	Los Angeles, California
3:00 p.m.	Florianne Jourde 62'; Maribel Flores 77'	Report	Faith Webber 12', 51', 61'; Heather Stainbrook (yellow card) 6'; Faith Webber (yellow card) 13'; Manthy Brady (yellow card) 32'; Sydney Bushman (yellow card) 70'	Stadium: McAlister Field; Attendance: 524; Referee: Alex Da Silva; Assistant referees: Jorge Partida; Aaron Zahler; Fourth official: Kaili Terry

=== vs New Mexico State ===
September 14th	USC Trojans	3-0	New Mexico State	Los Angeles, California
3:00 p.m.	Helena Sampaio 26'; Maribel Flores 27'; Kayla Colbert 75'; Helena Sampaio (yellow card) 79'	Report		Stadium: McAlister Field; Attendance: 410; Referee: Jamie Padilla; Assistant referees: Morgan Abbitt; Melissa Gonzalez; Fourth official: Karen Callado

== Rankings ==
Ranking movements Legend: ██ Increase in ranking ██ Decrease in ranking
	Week																
Poll	Pre	1	2	3	4	5	6	7	8	9	10	11	12	13	14	15	Final
United Soccer	22	24	19										Not released				
TopDrawer Soccer	25	24	19														
