= 2025 Conference USA women's soccer tournament =

- Classification: Division I
- Teams: 8
- Matches: 7
- Attendance: 2,277
- Site: Osborne Stadium; Lynchburg, Virginia
- Champions: Liberty (2nd title)
- Winning coach: Lang Wedemeyer (2nd title)
- MVP: Ivy Garner (Offensive); Lauren Littleton (Defensive) (Liberty)
- Broadcast: ESPN+

2025 Conference USA women's soccer standings
	Conf.						Overall
Team	W		L		T	PCT	W		L		T	PCT
Western Kentucky ‍†‍‍	6	–	0	–	2	.875	9	–	5	–	3	.618
Liberty ‍†‍‡‍^{y}	6	–	0	–	2	.875	14	–	4	–	4	.727
Sam Houston ‍‍‍	5	–	2	–	1	.688	8	–	6	–	3	.559
Middle Tennessee ‍‍‍	5	–	2	–	1	.688	11	–	6	–	3	.625
Florida International ‍‍‍	4	–	3	–	1	.563	7	–	6	–	4	.529
Delaware ‍‍‍	3	–	2	–	3	.563	10	–	2	–	6	.722
Louisiana Tech ‍‍‍	3	–	4	–	1	.438	4	–	13	–	2	.263
Missouri State ‍‍‍	2	–	3	–	3	.438	7	–	9	–	4	.450
New Mexico St ‍‍‍	1	–	3	–	4	.375	2	–	12	–	4	.222
Kennesaw State ‍‍‍	1	–	6	–	1	.188	2	–	11	–	4	.235
UTEP ‍‍‍	0	–	4	–	4	.250	3	–	9	–	5	.324
Jacksonville State ‍‍‍	0	–	7	–	1	.063	6	–	9	–	3	.417
† – Conference champion ‡ – 2025 C-USA Tournament champion y – Invited to the NCAA Tournament; As of December 9, 2025; Rankings from United Soccer Coaches Poll; Source:Conference USA

The 2025 Conference USA women's soccer tournament was the postseason women's soccer tournament for Conference USA (CUSA) held from November 2–7, 2025. The seven-match tournament took place at Osborne Stadium in Lynchburg, Virginia on the campus of Liberty University. The eight-team single-elimination tournament consisted of three rounds based on seeding from regular season conference play. The defending champions, the Florida International Pathers, were unable to defend their title as they lost in the Quarterfinals. Second seed Liberty won the title, defeating Missouri State 3–0 in the Final. The conference championship was Liberty's second title, and second in three years. It was also the second title for head coach Lang Wedemeyer. As tournament champions, Liberty earned CUSA's automatic berth into the 2025 NCAA Division I women's soccer tournament.

== Seeding ==
The top eight C-USA teams from the regular season earned berths in the tournament. Teams were seeded by conference record. A tiebreaker was required to determine the first and second seeds as Liberty and Western Kentucky both finished with identical 6–0–2 regular season conference records. The two teams did not play during the regular season so points against common conference opponents was used. Western Kentucky prevailed in this tiebreaker and earned the first seed. A tiebreaker was also required for the third and fourth seeds as both Middle Tennessee and Sam Houston finished with 5–2–1 regular season conference records. Sam Houston earned the third seed by virtue of their 1–0 defeat of Middle Tennessee on October 2, during the regular season.

Seed	School	Conference Record	Points
1	Western Kentucky	6–0–2	20
2	Liberty	6–0–2	20
3	Sam Houston	5–2–1	16
4	Middle Tennessee	5–2–1	16
5	Florida International	4–3–1	13
6	Delaware	3–2–3	12
7	Louisiana Tech	3–4–1	10
8	Missouri State	2–3–3	9

== Bracket ==
Quarterfinals; November 2
2	Liberty	4
7	Louisiana Tech	1
3	Sam Houston (pen.)	1 (6)
6	Delaware	1 (5)
1	Western Kentucky	0
8	Missouri State	2
4	Middle Tennessee (a.e.t.)	1
5	Florida International	0

Semifinals; November 7
2	Liberty	2
3	Sam Houston	0
8	Missouri State	2
4	Middle Tennessee	1

Championship; November 7
2	Liberty	3
8	Missouri State	0

== Schedule ==
=== First Round ===
November 2	(2) Liberty	4–1	(7) Louisiana Tech	Lynchburg, VA
11:00 a.m. EST	Ivy Garner 13', 25'; Halle Engle 29'; Isabella Wedemeyer 37'	Report	3' Ashley Leonhart	Stadium: Osborne Stadium; Attendance: 423; Referee: Jorge Ramirez; Assistant referees: Kevin Uitto; Amy Balbier; Fourth official: Shevah Rezaee

November 2	(3) Sam Houston	1–1 (a.e.t.) (6–5 p)	(6) Delaware	Lynchburg, VA
1:40 p.m. EST	Cadence Sanders (yellow card) 70'; Kelsey Villatoro 78'	Report	31' Sophia Zeppos	Stadium: Osborne Stadium; Attendance: 282; Referee: Shane Butler; Assistant referees: Shevah Rezaee; Kyle Trissel; Fourth official: Jorge Ramirez
	Penalties
	Gabrielle Gipson (penalty scored); Addi Christian (penalty scored); Taylor Vance (penalty missed); Ruth Larsen (penalty missed); Jasmine Marquez (penalty scored); Kaite Bahn (penalty scored); Alesandra Maldonado (penalty scored); Jasmine Dybala (penalty missed); Pam Murray (penalty scored)		(penalty scored) Brooke Vogel; (penalty missed) Lilli Lubic; (penalty scored) Gabby Riley; (penalty missed) Ava Agresti; (penalty scored) Constanze Viehmann; (penalty scored) Adiat Olaogun-Dickson; (penalty scored) Maggie Groh; (penalty missed) Leilah Sallee; (penalty missed) Sophia Hall

November 2	(1) Western Kentucky	0–2	(8) Missouri State	Lynchburg, VA
5:00 p.m. EST		Report	34' Ellie Neath; 58' Reilly Heman	Stadium: Osborne Stadium; Attendance: 141; Referee: Amin Hadzic; Assistant referees: Amy Balbier; Kevin Uitto; Fourth official: Kyle Johnston

November 2	(4) Middle Tennessee	1–0 (a.e.t.)	(5) Florida International	Lynchburg, VA
7:40 p.m. EST	Hannah Murphy 97'	Report		Stadium: Osborne Stadium; Attendance: 141; Referee: Kyle Johnston; Assistant referees: Kyle Trissel; Esli Leon; Fourth official: Amin Hadzic

=== Semifinals ===
November 4	(2) Liberty	2–0	(3) Sam Houston	Lynchburg, VA
4:00 p.m. EST	Ivy Garner 6' (pen.), 55'; Avenley Monteith (yellow card) 55'	Report	(yellow card) 58' Kinsey Hill; (yellow card) 75' Alesandra Maldonado	Stadium: Osborne Stadium; Attendance: 300; Referee: Elvis Osmanovic; Assistant referees: Lauren Aldrich; Shevah Rezaee; Fourth official: Kyle Johnson

November 4	(4) Middle Tennessee	1–2	(8) Missouri State	Lynchburg, VA
7:00 p.m. EST	Taijah Fraser 23'; Hannah Murphy (yellow card) 76'	Report	5' Lillie Rasmussen; 33' Ellie Neath	Stadium: Osborne Stadium; Attendance: 292; Referee: Jorge Ramirez; Assistant referees: Amy Balbier; Kyle Trissel; Fourth official: Shane Butler

=== Final ===
November 7	(2) Liberty	3–0	(8) Missouri State	Lynchburg, VA
12:00 p.m. EST	Lauren Flax 4', 29'; Ivy Garner 46' (pen.); Lauren Littlejohn (yellow card) 50'	Report	(yellow card) 61' Team; (yellow card) 70' Maggie O'Keefe; (yellow card) 88' Julia Kristensen	Stadium: Osborne Stadium; Attendance: 698; Referee: Kyle Johnston; Assistant referees: Lauren Aldrich; Kevin Uitto; Fourth official: Shevah Rezaee

== Statistics ==
=== Goalscorers ===
There were 18 goals scored in 7 matches, for an average of 2.57 goals per match (as of November 7, 2025).

5 goals

- Ivy Garner – Liberty

2 goals

- Lauren Flax – Liberty
- Ellie Neath – Missouri State

1 goal

- Sophia Zeppos – Delaware
- Halle Engle – Liberty
- Isabella Wedemeyer – Liberty
- Ashley Leonhart – Louisiana Tech
- Taijah Fraser – Middle Tennessee
- Hannah Murphy – Middle Tennessee
- Reilly Heman – Missouri State
- Lillie Rasmussen – Missouri State
- Kelsey Villatoro – Sam Houston

== All-Tournament team ==
Player	Team
Lauren Flax	Liberty
Ivy Garner*	Liberty
Lauren Littleton^	Liberty
Bri Myers	Liberty
Ella Becker	Missouri State
Jane Hansen	Missouri State
Ellie Neath	Missouri State
Emma Brown	Middle Tennessee
Emma Pettersen	Middle Tennessee
Katie Bahn	Sam Houston
Kinsey Hill	Sam Houston

* Offensive MVP
^ Defensive MVP
