= 2023 America East Conference women's soccer tournament =

- Classification: Division I
- Teams: 6
- Matches: 5
- Attendance: 1,956
- Site: Campus Sites (Higher Seed)
- Champions: Maine (1st title)
- Winning coach: Scott Atherley (1st title)
- MVP: Lara Kirkby (Maine)
- Broadcast: ESPN+

2023 America East Conference women's soccer standings
	Conf.						Overall
Team	W		L		T	PCT	W		L		T	PCT
Binghamton ‍†‍‍	5	–	0	–	3	.813	6	–	5	–	6	.529
Maine ‍‍‡‍^{y}	4	–	1	–	3	.688	11	–	2	–	6	.737
New Hampshire ‍‍‍	3	–	1	–	4	.625	6	–	5	–	5	.531
UMass Lowell ‍‍‍	3	–	2	–	3	.563	5	–	6	–	7	.472
NJIT ‍‍‍	3	–	4	–	1	.438	7	–	7	–	5	.500
Vermont ‍‍‍	3	–	4	–	1	.438	10	–	7	–	1	.583
Bryant ‍‍‍	2	–	3	–	3	.438	7	–	5	–	4	.563
Albany ‍‍‍	1	–	5	–	2	.250	4	–	10	–	2	.313
UMBC ‍‍‍	0	–	4	–	4	.250	3	–	11	–	4	.278
† – Conference champion ‡ – 2023 America East Tournament champion y – Invited to the NCAA Tournament; As of December 5, 2023; Rankings from United Soccer Coaches Poll; Source: America East Conference

The 2023 America East Conference women's soccer tournament was the postseason women's soccer tournament for the America East Conference held from October 30 to November 5, 2023. The five-match tournament took place at campus sites, with the higher-seeded team hosting each match. The six-team, single-elimination tournament consisted of three rounds, according to their regular-season conference standings. The defending champions were the New Hampshire Wildcats, who were unable to defend their title after falling in the first round to Vermont. Maine won the tournament after an overtime victory in the final over UMass Lowell. It was the first tournament title in Maine’s program history and the first for head coach Scott Atherly in his 23rd year. As tournament champions, Maine earned the America East's automatic berth in the 2023 NCAA Division I women's soccer tournament.

== Seeding ==
The top six teams in the regular season qualified for the tournament. A tiebreaker was required to determine the fifth and sixth seeds for the tournament as NJIT and Vermont both finished with 3–4–1 records during regular season play. NJIT earned the fifth seed by virtue of their 3–2 victory at Vermont on October 22. As a result, Vermont was the sixth seed in the tournament.

Seed	School	Conference Record	Points
1	Binghamton	5–0–3	18
2	Maine	4–1–3	15
3	New Hampshire	3–1–4	13
4	UMass Lowell	3–2–3	12
5	NJIT	3–4–1	10
6	Vermont	3–4–1	10

== Bracket ==
Quarterfinals; Monday, Oct. 30
4	UMass Lowell	3
5	NJIT	1
3	New Hampshire	1
6	Vermont	2

Semifinals; Thursday, Nov. 2
1	Binghamton	1
4	UMass Lowell (a.e.t.)	2
2	Maine	2
6	Vermont	1

Final; Sunday, Nov. 5
4	UMass Lowell	2
2	Maine (a.e.t.)	3

== Schedule ==
=== Quarterfinals ===
October 30	#3 New Hampshire	1–2	#6 Vermont	Durham, NH
6:00 p.m.	Megan Logue 89'	Report	55' Jill Brody; 75' Lauren DeGroot	Stadium: Wildcat Stadium; Attendance: 133; Referee: Victor Matheson; Assistant referees: Jason Ayotte; John Jordan

October 30	#4 UMass Lowell	3–1	#5 NJIT	Lowell, MA
6:00 p.m.	Chole Layne 15'; Megan Banzi (yellow card) 22'; Julia Edholm 25', 71', (yellow card) 74'; Maddie Guthrie (yellow card) 76'	Report	(yellow card) 28' (yellow-red card) 33' Riley Jones; (yellow card) 39' Briana Andreoli; 77' Bailey Chant	Stadium: Cushing Field; Attendance: 202; Referee: Victor Borges; Assistant referees: Adam Cook; Matt Stein; Fourth official: Nicola Vesia

=== Semifinals ===
November 2	#1 Binghamton	1–2 (a.e.t.)	#4 UMass Lowell	Vestal, NY
6:00 p.m.	Sophia Garofalo 2'; Lauren Clark (yellow card) 30'	Report	69', (yellow card) 77' Julia Edholm; 102' Hope Santaniello	Stadium: Bearcats Sports Complex; Attendance: 381; Referee: Magda Zwierzchowski; Assistant referees: Jeffrey Trubia; Judson Ames; Fourth official: Chris Scalza

November 2	#2 Maine	2–1	#6 Vermont	Orono, ME
6:00 p.m.	Abby Kraemer 11', 90'	Report	52' Lauren DeGroot; (yellow card) 74' Jilly Brody	Stadium: Mahaney Diamond; Attendance: 486; Referee: Stephanie MacFarland; Assistant referees: Jessica Remmes-Davis; Andrew Porada; Fourth official: Ptya Lomeri

=== Final ===
November 5	#2 Maine	3–2	#4 UMass Lowell	Orono, ME
2:00 p.m.	Kayla Kraemer 15'; Lara Kirkby 41' (pen.), 105'; Kristina Kelly (yellow card) 99'	Report	(yellow card) 41' Taylor Burgess; 45' Juila Edholm; (yellow card) 68', (goal) 86' (pen.) Calliste Brookshire	Stadium: Mahaney Diamond; Attendance: 754; Referee: Luis Reyes; Assistant referees: Kyle Averill; Andrew Porada; Fourth official: Aruna Kenyi

== Statistics ==
=== Goalscorers ===
There were 18 goals scored in 5 matches, for an average of 3.6 goals per match (as of November 5, 2023).

4 goals

- Juila Edholm – UMass Lowell

2 goals

- Lara Kirkby – Maine
- Abby Kraemer – Maine
- Lauren DeGroot – Vermont

1 goal

- Sophia Garofalo – Binghamton
- Kayla Kraemer – Maine
- Megan Logue – New Hampshire
- Bailey Chant – NJIT
- Jill Brody – Vermont
- Calliste Brookshire – UMass Lowell
- Chloe Layne – UMass Lowell
- Hope Santaniello – UMass Lowell

== All-Tournament team ==
Player	Team
Rebecca Grisdale	Maine
Kristina Kelly	Maine
Abby Kraemer	Maine
**Lara Kirkby**	Maine
Calliste Brookshire	NJIT
Taylor Burgess	NJIT
Julia Edholm	NJIT
Emma Colling	Binghamton
Oliva McKnight	Binghamton
Maddy Cronin	Vermont
Lauren DeGroot	Vermont
Alivia Kelly	New Hampshire
Bailey Chant	NJIT

MVP in bold
