= 2023 UCLA Bruins women's soccer team =

American college soccer season

2023 UCLA Bruins women's soccer
- Conference: Pac-12 Conference
- U. Soc. Coaches poll: No. 1
- TopDrawerSoccer.com: No. 1
- Record: 1–0–0 (0–0–0 Pac-12)
- Head coach: Margueritte Aozasa (2nd season)
- Assistant coaches: Gof Boyoko (2nd season); Molly Poletto (2nd season); Gina Brewer (1st season)
- Home stadium: Wallis Annenberg Stadium (Capacity: 2,145)

The 2023 UCLA Bruins Women's Soccer Team represented the University of California, Los Angeles (UCLA) during the 2023 NCAA Division I women's soccer season.

== Squad ==
=== Roster ===
As of August 2023:

Note: Flags indicate national team as defined under FIFA eligibility rules; some limited exceptions apply. Players may hold more than one non-FIFA nationality.

No.	Pos.	Nation	Player
0	GK	USA	Kelly McManus
00	GK	USA	Faith Nguyen
1	GK	USA	Neeku Purcell
2	DF	USA	Ayo Oke
3	DF	USA	Maya Evans
4	DF	USA	Lilly Reale
5	DF	USA	Milla Shafie
7	DF	USA	Jordyn Gather
8	MF	USA	Peyton Marcisz
9	MF	USA	Sofia Cook
10	MF	USA	Ally Lemos
11	FW	MEX	América Frías
12	MF	USA	Michaela Rosenbaum
13	MF	USA	Emma Egizii
14	FW	USA	Val Vargas
15	DF	USA	Jayden Perry

No.	Pos.	Nation	Player
16	FW	USA	Taylor Cheatham
17	FW	USA	Lexi Wright
18	DF	USA	Emily Pringle
19	DF	USA	Quincy McMahon
20	DF	NOR	My Haugland Sørsdahl
21	MF	USA	MacKenzee Vance
22	MF	USA	Jen Alvarado
23	FW	USA	Janae DeFazio
24	FW	USA	Sophie Reale
26	MF	MEX	Bridgette Marin-Valencia
27	MF	USA	Kirsten Crane
30	MF	USA	Megan Edelman
33	FW	USA	Ally Cook
36	MF	USA	Maya Leoni
50	MF	USA	Sunshine Fontes
66	FW	USA	Reilyn Turner

== Schedule and results ==
Date Time, TV	Rank^{#}	Opponent^{#}	Result	Record	Site (Attendance) City, State
Exhibition
August 12th 5:00 p.m.	No. 1	at Fresno State	W 4-0	–	The Bulldog Soccer Stadium (N/A); Fresno, California
Non-conference regular season
August 17; 7:00 p.m., P12N	No. 1	Georgia	W 2-0	1-0-0	Wallis Annenberg Stadium (691); Westwood, Los Angeles, California
August 20th 10:30 a.m., P12N	No. 1	Portland	Canceled	1-0-0	Wallis Annenberg Stadium; Westwood, Los Angeles, California
August 24th 7:00 p.m., P12N	No. 1	Cal Poly	W 2-1	2-0-0	Wallis Annenberg Stadium; Westwood, Los Angeles, California
August 27th 6:30 p.m., ESPN+	No. 1	at UC Irvine	W 4-0	3-0-0	Anteater Stadium; Irvine, California
August 31st 7:00 p.m., ESPN+		at BYU	L 1-3	3-1-0	South Field; Provo, Utah
September 7th 7:00 p.m., P12N		Long Beach State	W 4-0	4-1-0	Wallis Annenberg Stadium; Westwood, Los Angeles, California
September 10th 4:00 p.m., ESPN+		at CSUN	W 3-0	5-1-0	Matador Soccer Field; Northridge, California
September 15th 7:00 p.m., UCLA Live Stream-2		Pepperdine	W 2-0	6-1-0	Wallis Annenberg Stadium; Westwood, Los Angeles, California
Conference Regular season
September 22nd 6;00 p.m., P12N		at Colorado	W 3-1	7-1-0 (1-0-0)	Prentup Field; Boulder, Colorado
September 28th 7:00 p.m., P12N		at Washington	W 3-2	8-1-0 (2-0-0)	Huskey Soccer Stadium; Seattle, Washington
October 1st 12:00 p.m., P12N		at Washington State	W 2-0	9-1-0 (3-0-0)	Lower Soccer Field; Pullman, Washington
October 5th 7:00 p.m., P12NLA		Oregon State	W 6-0	10-1-0 (4-0-0)	Wallis Annenberg Stadium; Westwood, Los Angeles, California
October 8th 1:00 p.m., Pac-12 Insider		Oregon	W 4-0	11-1-0 (5-0-0)	Wallis Annenberg Stadium; Westwood, Los Angeles, California
October 13th 6:00 p.m., P12N		Utah	W 4-0	12-1-0 (6-0-0)	Wallis Annenberg Stadium; Westwood, Los Angeles, California
October 19th 7:00 p.m., P12NLA		at Arizona	W 4-1	13-1-0 (7-0-0)	Murphey Field at Mulcahy Soccer Stadium; Tucson, Arizona
October 22nd 1:00 p.m., Pac-12 Insider		at Arizona State	W 1-0	14-1-0 (8-0-0)	Sun Devil Soccer Stadium; Tempe, Arizona
October 26th 4:00 p.m., P12N		California	W 2-0	15-1-0 (9-0-0)	Wallis Annenberg Stadium; Westwood, Los Angeles, California
October 29th 12:00 p.m., P12N		Stanford	T 1-1	15-1-1 (9-0-1)	Wallis Annenberg Stadium; Westwood, Los Angeles, California
November 3rd 7:00 p.m., P12N		USC; Rivalry	W 4-2	16-1-1 (10-0-1)	Wallis Annenberg Stadium; Westwood, Los Angeles, California
NCAA tournament
November 10th 6:00 p.m., ESPN+	(1)	UC Irvine; First Round	L 0-1	16-2-1	Wallis Annenberg Stadium; Westwood, Los Angeles, California
*Non-conference game. ^{#}Rankings from United Soccer Coaches. (#) Tournament seedings in parentheses. All times are in Pacific.

== Game summaries ==
=== at Fresno State (Exhibition) ===
August 12th	Fresno State Bulldogs	0-4	UCLA Bruins	Fresno, California
5:00 p.m.			Goal	Stadium: The Bulldog Soccer Stadium

=== vs Georgia ===
August 17th	UCLA Bruins	2-0	Georgia Bulldogs	Westwood, Los Angeles, California
7:00 p.m.	Jayden Perry 22' (pen.); Reilyn Turner (yellow card) 65'; Ally Cook 69' (yellow card) 77'	Report		Stadium: Wallis Annenberg Stadium; Attendance: 691; Referee: Reymond Moffatte Jr. Assistant referees: Jared Kennedy; Eduardo Chavez; Fourth official: Andie Reyes

=== vs Portland ===
August 20th	UCLA Bruins	pp	Portland Piolts	Westwood, Los Angeles, California
10:30 a.m.				Stadium: Wallis Annenberg Stadium

=== vs Cal Poly ===
August 24th	UCLA Bruins	2-1	Cal Poly Mustangs	Westwood, Los Angeles, California
7:00 p.m.	Ally Cook 27'; Ayo Oke (yellow card) 47'; Val Vargas (yellow card) 81'; Sunshine Fontes 88' (pen.); Jayden Perry (yellow card) 89'	Report	Bailey Bracha (yellow card) 49' (yellow-red card) 56'; Kate Reedy 52'	Stadium: Wallis Annenberg Stadium; Referee: Jorge Partida; Assistant referees: Jonathan Kaminski; Mercey Watfa; Fourth official: Sarah Ramadan

=== at UC Irvine ===
August 27th	UC Irvine Anteaters	0-4	UCLA Bruins	Irvine, California
6:30 p.m.	Ally Cook 17'; Reilyn Turner 26'; Lexi Wright 52'; Val Vargas 85'	Report	Kirea Smeenge (yellow card) 54'; Alyssa Moore (yellow card) 60'; Emilie Castagna (yellow card) 64'	Stadium: Anteater Stadium; Attendance: 2,068; Referee: Ravel Georgiev; Assistant referees: Marissa Postlethwaite; Erik Sabogal; Fourth official: Nathan Max

=== at BYU ===
August 31st	BYU Cougars	v	UCLA Bruins	Provo, Utah
7:00 p.m.				Stadium: South Field

== Rankings ==
Ranking movements Legend: ██ Increase in ranking ██ Decrease in ranking — = Not ranked
	Week																	
Poll	Pre	1	2	3	4	5	6	7	8	9	10	11	12	13	14	15	16	Final
United Soccer	1	1	1	4	5	5	5	5	5	2	2	2	Not released					15
TopDrawer Soccer	1	1	1	6	5	4	4	3	2	2	2	2	2	—	—	—	—	
