= 2023 Ohio Valley Conference women's soccer tournament =

- Classification: Division I
- Teams: 8
- Matches: 7
- Attendance: 2,336
- Site: Tech Soccer Field; Cookeville, Tennessee (Semifinals & Final)
- Champions: Morehead State (4th title)
- Winning coach: Chris Fox (1st title)
- MVP: Kate Larbes (Morehead State)
- Broadcast: ESPN+

2023 Ohio Valley Conference women's soccer standings
	Conf.						Overall
Team	W		L		T	PCT	W		L		T	PCT
Tennessee Tech ‍†‍‍	7	–	1	–	1	.833	9	–	6	–	4	.579
Morehead State ‍‍‡‍^{y}	6	–	1	–	2	.778	9	–	6	–	5	.575
SIU Edwardsville ‍‍‍	3	–	2	–	4	.556	5	–	6	–	6	.471
Southern Indiana ‍‍‍	3	–	2	–	4	.556	4	–	8	–	7	.395
UT Martin ‍‍‍	2	–	2	–	5	.500	5	–	8	–	6	.421
Little Rock ‍‍‍	2	–	3	–	4	.444	7	–	5	–	8	.550
Southeast Missouri State ‍‍‍	2	–	3	–	4	.444	7	–	6	–	6	.526
Eastern Illinois ‍‍‍	3	–	4	–	2	.444	4	–	9	–	4	.353
Western Illinois ‍‍‍	1	–	4	–	4	.333	3	–	8	–	5	.344
Lindenwood ‍‍‍	1	–	8	–	0	.111	3	–	13	–	1	.206
† – Conference champion ‡ – 2023 OVC Tournament champion y – Invited to the NCAA Tournament; As of December 5, 2023; Rankings from United Soccer Coaches Poll; Source: Ohio Valley Conference

The 2023 Ohio Valley Conference women's soccer tournament was the postseason women's soccer tournament for the Ohio Valley Conference held from October 27 through November 5, 2023. The first round and quarterfinals of the tournament were held at campus sites hosted by the #3 and #4 seeds, while the semifinals and final took place at Tech Soccer Field in Cookeville, Tennessee. The eight-team single-elimination tournament consisted of four rounds based on seeding from regular season conference play. The SIU Edwardsville Cougars were the defending champions and were unable to defend their title as they lost to Southeast Missouri State in a penalty shootout in the Quarterfinals. Morehead State would go on to defeat Tennessee Tech in overtime in the Final, 1–0. The conference tournament title was the fourth for the Morehead State women's soccer program, and the first for head coach Chris Fox. This was Morehead State's first title since 2013. As tournament champions, Morehead State earned the Ohio Valley's automatic berth into the 2023 NCAA Division I Women's Soccer Tournament.

== Seeding ==
Eight of the ten teams in the Ohio Valley Conference qualified for the 2023 Tournament. The #1 seed was awarded as the host institution for the Semifinals and Finals of the tournament. The #1 and #2 seed received byes to the Semifinals, while the #4 and #5 seeds received byes to the Quarterfinals. Seems were seeded based on regular season records. A tiebreaker was required to determine the third and fourth seeds as both SIU Edwardsville and Southern Indiana finished with identical with 3–2–4 regular season records. The two teams tied during the regular season, and SIU Edwardsville was awarded the third seed while Southern Indiana was the fourth seed. A second tiebreaker was required between UT Martin and Eastern Illinois both finished with eleven regular season points. UT Martin was awarded the fifth seed as they won the October 8 regular season matchup 1–0. A third tiebreaker was required between Southeast Missouri State and Little Rock as both finished with 2–3–4 regular season records. The two teams tied their October 5 regular season match up and Southeast Missouri State was awarded the seventh seed, while Little Rock was the eighth seed.

Seed	School	Conference Record	Points
1	Tennessee Tech	7–1–1	22
2	Morehead State	6–1–2	20
3	SIU Edwardsville	3–2–4	13
4	Southern Indiana	3–2–4	13
5	UT Martin	2–2–5	11
6	Eastern Illinois	3–4–2	11
7	Southeast Missouri State	2–3–4	10
8	Little Rock	2–3–4	10

== Bracket ==
First round Friday, Oct. 27
5	UT Martin	0
8	Little Rock	1
6	Eastern Illinois	0
7	Southeast Missouri State (a.e.t.)	1

Quarterfinals; Sunday, Oct. 29
4	Southern Indiana	1
8	Little Rock	3
3	SIU Edwardsville	1 (4)
7	Southeast Missouri State (pen.)	1 (5)

Semifinals; Friday, Nov. 2
1	Tennessee Tech	2
8	Little Rock	0
2	Morehead State	1
7	Southeast Missouri State	0

Final; Sunday, Nov. 5
1	Tennessee Tech	0
2	Morehead State (a.e.t.)	1

== Schedule ==
=== First round ===
October 27	#5 UT Martin	0–1	#8 Little Rock	Evansville, IN
1:00 p.m. CT	Shayla Addington (yellow card) 77'	Report	15' Mykena Turner; (yellow card) 89' Team	Stadium: Strassweg Field; Attendance: 125; Referee: William DeLois; Assistant referees: Abdu Bensalah; Jeff Pulley; Fourth official: Sao Kamara

October 27	#6 Eastern Illinois	0–1 (a.e.t.)	#7 Southeast Missouri State	Edwardsville, IL
7:00 p.m. CT		Report	94' Emily Baker	Stadium: Korte Stadium; Attendance: 116; Referee: Robert Musolu; Assistant referees: Steven Cowles; Jeffrey Hay; Fourth official: Benjamin Koenig

=== Quarterfinals ===
October 29	#4 Southern Indiana	1–3	#8 Little Rock	Evansville, IN
1:00 p.m. CT	Alexis Schone (yellow card) 52'; Avery Schone (yellow card) 66'; Pilar Torres 72', (yellow card) 89'; Peyton Murphy (yellow card) 88'	Report	47' Sanaa Williams; 63' Madison Eisner; 68' Jaeda Centeno	Stadium: Strassweg Field; Attendance: 100; Referee: Gustavo Turmero; Assistant referees: Kevin Kernen; Timothy Stewart; Fourth official: Cody Kerstiens

October 29	#3 SIU Edwardsville	1–1 (a.e.t.) (4–5 p)	#7 Southeast Missouri State	Edwardsville, IL
3:00 p.m. CT	Sidney Christopher 4'; Macie Begley (yellow card) 85'	Report	(yellow card) 20' Faith Liljegren; 88' Alayna Jakul	Stadium: Korte Stadium; Attendance: 76; Referee: Don Tebeau; Assistant referees: Colin Huber; Laurel Theriot; Fourth official: Seth Erickson
	Penalties
	Macie Begley (penalty missed); Ashlyn Nichols (penalty scored); Matea Diekema (penalty scored); Jay Viola (penalty scored); Sidney Christopher (penalty missed); Kasey Neidhart (penalty scored); Kaityln Nichols (penalty missed)		(penalty scored) Zoe Houston; (penalty missed) Cayla Koerner; (penalty scored) Maddie Paulson; (penalty missed) Emily Baker; (penalty scored) Natalie Jackson; (penalty scored) Justi Nelson; (penalty scored) Emma Tucker

=== Semifinals ===
November 2	#1 Tennessee Tech	2–0	#8 Little Rock	Cookeville, TN
4:00 p.m. CT	Katie Toney 66'; Tori Soutuyo 72'	Report		Stadium: Tech Soccer Field; Attendance: 673; Referee: Jessica Medley; Assistant referees: Devin Bargatze; Timothy Stewart; Fourth official: Skyye Medley

November 2	#2 Morehead State	1–0	#7 Southeast Missouri State	Cookeville, TN
7:00 p.m. CT	Kate Larbes 83'; Hedda Ornberg (yellow card) 88' (yellow-red card) 89'	Report	(yellow card) 66' Abbey Klund; (yellow card) 90' Faith Liljegren; (yellow card) 90' Alayna Jakul	Stadium: Tech Soccer Field; Attendance: 102; Referee: Lucy Bell; Assistant referees: Nicole Steiner; Jason Steiner; Fourth official: John Devalk

=== Final ===
November 5	#1 Tennessee Tech	0–1 (a.e.t.)	#2 Morehead State	Cookeville, TN
1:00 p.m. CT	Team (yellow card) 37'; Neve Renwick (yellow card) 81'	Report	(yellow card) 81' Team; (yellow card) 84' Colleen Swift; 93' Michelle Hochstadt; (yellow card) 94' Gracen Houck	Stadium: Tech Soccer Field; Attendance: 1,144; Referee: Don Eubank; Assistant referees: Donovan Eubank; Timothy Stewart; Fourth official: Adam Warner

== Statistics ==
=== Goalscorers ===
There were 12 goals scored in 7 matches, for an average of 1.71 goals per match (as of November 5, 2023).

1 goal

- Jaeda Centeno – Little Rock
- Madison Eisner – Little Rock
- Mykena Turner – Little Rock
- Sanaa Williams – Little Rock
- Michelle Hochstadt – Morehead State
- Kate Larbes – Morehead State
- Sidney Christopher – SIU Edwardsville
- Emily Baker – Southeast Missouri State
- Alayna Jakul – Southeast Missouri State
- Pilar Torres – Southern Indiana
- Tori Soutuyo – Tennessee Tech
- Katie Toney – Tennessee Tech

== All-Tournament team ==
Player	Team
Kaitlin Graeber	Little Rock
Sanaa Williams	Little Rock
Erin Gibbs	Morehead State
**Kate Larbes**	Morehead State
Anna Lohrer	Morehead State
Avery Redmon	Morehead State
Emma Brune	Southeast Missouri State
Maddie Paulson	Southeast Missouri State
Selma Askildsen	Tennessee Tech
Meredith Nye	Tennessee Tech
Katie Toney	Tennessee Tech

MVP in bold
