= 2023 Big South Conference women's soccer tournament =

- Classification: Division I
- Teams: 4
- Matches: 3
- Attendance: 6
- Site: Sportsplex at Matthews; Matthews, North Carolina
- Champions: Radford (9th title)
- Winning coach: Ben Sohrabi (9th title)
- MVP: Lilly Short (Radford)
- Broadcast: ESPN+

2023 Big South Conference women's soccer standings
	Conf.						Overall
Team	W		L		T	PCT	W		L		T	PCT
Radford ‍†‍‡‍^{y}	6	–	1	–	1	.813	12	–	6	–	2	.650
USC Upstate ‍‍‍	6	–	2	–	0	.750	11	–	4	–	4	.684
High Point ‍‍‍	4	–	1	–	3	.688	6	–	5	–	7	.528
Charleston Southern ‍‍‍	4	–	2	–	2	.625	9	–	5	–	4	.611
Longwood ‍‍‍	3	–	2	–	3	.563	5	–	7	–	5	.441
Presbyterian ‍‍‍	2	–	4	–	2	.375	3	–	10	–	3	.281
UNC Asheville ‍‍‍	2	–	5	–	1	.313	7	–	6	–	4	.529
Winthrop ‍‍‍	1	–	6	–	1	.188	4	–	8	–	2	.357
Gardner–Webb ‍‍‍	1	–	6	–	1	.188	4	–	12	–	2	.278
† – Conference champion ‡ – 2023 Big South Tournament champion y – Invited to the NCAA Tournament; As of December 5, 2023; Rankings from United Soccer Coaches Poll; Source: Big South Conference

The 2023 Big South Conference women's soccer tournament was the postseason women's soccer tournament for the Big South Conference held from November 2 through November 5, 2023. The tournament was hosted by the Sportsplex at Matthews in Matthews, North Carolina. The four team-team single-elimination tournament consisted of two rounds based on seeding from regular season conference play. Radford were the defending champions, and they were the first seed in the 2023 tournament. They successfully defended their title by again defeating USC Upstate in the Final. The conference tournament title was the ninth for the Radford women's soccer program, all of which have come under head coach Ben Sohrabi. The title was also Radford's fourth in six years. As tournament champions, Radford earned the Big South's automatic berth into the 2023 NCAA Division I women's soccer tournament.

== Seeding ==
The top four teams in the regular season earned a spot in the tournament. No tiebreakers were required as each of the top four teams finished with a unique point total in conference play.

Seed	School	Conference Record	Points
1	Radford	6–1–1	19
2	USC Upstate	6–2–0	18
3	High Point	4–1–3	15
4	Charleston Southern	4–2–2	14

== Bracket ==
Semifinals; Thursday, Nov. 2
1	Radford	2
4	Charleston Southern	1
2	USC Upstate	2
3	High Point	0

Final; Sunday, Nov. 5
1	Radford	2
2	USC Upstate	1

== Schedule ==
=== Semifinals ===
November 2	#1 Radford	2–1	#4 Charleston Southern	Matthews, NC
4:00 p.m. ET	Lilly Short 26'; Ashley Loundermon 71'	Report	35' Abby Angelucci	Stadium: Sportsplex at Matthews; Attendance: 1 Referee: Alyssa Nichols; Assistant referees: Justin Howard; Marcus Moss; Fourth official: William Steffen

November 2	#2 USC Upstate	2–0	#3 High Point	Matthews, NC
7:00 p.m. ET	Ashley Finn 6', (yellow card) 49'; Dara Russo 77'	Report	(yellow card) 50' Meg Roden	Stadium: Sportsplex at Matthews; Attendance: 2 Referee: Richard Crowgey; Assistant referees: Rick Rogers; Tarver Pyke; Fourth official: John Matto

=== Final ===
November 5	#1 Radford	2–1	#2 USC Upstate	Matthews, NC
1:00 p.m. ET	Ashley Loudermon 32'; Caitlyn Nottingham (yellow card) 45'; Lilly Short 70'	Report	(yellow card) 37' Rachel Stachell; 79' Dara Russo; (yellow card) 85' Emily Rangel; (yellow card) 90' Team	Stadium: Sportsplex at Matthews; Attendance: 3 Referee: Otto Leon; Assistant referees: Robert Dail; Aaron Hormuth; Fourth official: Shawn Meach

== Statistics ==
=== Goalscorers ===
There were 8 goals scored in 3 matches, for an average of 2.67 goals per match (as of November 5, 2023).

2 goals

- Ashley Loudermon – Radford
- Lilly Short – Radford
- Dara Russo – USC Upstate

1 goal

- Abby Angelucci – Charleston Southern
- Ashley Finn – USC Upstate

== All-Tournament team ==
Player	Team
Ashley Loundermon	Radford
Alexeis Kirnos	Radford
**Lilly Short**	Radford
Helena Wilson	Radford
Audrey Baer	USC Upstate
Emily Rangel	USC Upstate
Dara Russo	USC Upstate
Fain Buete	High Point
Alex DePerno	High Point
Abby Angelucci	Charleston Southern
Jenna Moran	Charleston Southern

MVP in bold
