= 2023 Conference USA women's soccer tournament =

- Classification: Division I
- Teams: 6
- Matches: 5
- Attendance: 1,242
- Site: Robert Mack Caruthers Field; Ruston, Louisiana
- Champions: Liberty (1st title)
- Winning coach: Lang Wedemeyer (1st title)
- MVP: Rachel DeRuby (Offensive); Ainsley Leja (Defensive) (Liberty)
- Broadcast: ESPN+

2023 Conference USA women's soccer standings
	Conf.						Overall
Team	W		L		T	PCT	W		L		T	PCT
New Mexico State ‍†‍‍	6	–	0	–	2	.875	10	–	6	–	3	.605
Liberty ‍‍‡‍^{y}	5	–	2	–	1	.688	16	–	3	–	1	.825
Western Kentucky ‍‍‍	4	–	2	–	2	.625	6	–	5	–	7	.528
FIU ‍‍‍	3	–	2	–	3	.563	8	–	6	–	4	.556
Sam Houston ‍‍‍	3	–	3	–	2	.500	6	–	7	–	4	.471
Louisiana Tech ‍‍‍	2	–	4	–	2	.375	6	–	11	–	3	.375
Middle Tennessee ‍‍‍	2	–	5	–	1	.313	6	–	9	–	3	.417
UTEP ‍‍‍	1	–	4	–	3	.313	2	–	11	–	4	.235
Jacksonville State ‍‍‍	1	–	5	–	2	.250	6	–	9	–	2	.412
† – Conference champion ‡ – 2023 C-USA Tournament champion y – Invited to the NCAA Tournament; As of December 5, 2023; Rankings from United Soccer Coaches Poll; Source: Conference USA

The 2023 Conference USA women's soccer tournament was the postseason women's soccer tournament for Conference USA (CUSA) held from November 1–5, 2023. The five-match tournament took place at Robert Mack Caruthers Field in Ruston, Louisiana. The six-team single-elimination tournament consisted of three rounds based on seeding from regular season conference play. The defending champions, the UTSA Roadrunners, could not defend their title as they moved to the American Athletic Conference in July 2023. The Liberty Lady Flames won the title by defeating New Mexico State 2–1 in the final. The conference championship in Liberty's first CUSA season was the eighth overall for the program, with six having been won in the Big South Conference and one in the Atlantic Sun Conference, and the first for head coach Lang Wedemeyer. As tournament champions, Liberty earned CUSA's automatic berth into the 2023 NCAA Division I women's soccer tournament.

== Seeding ==
Six CUSA schools participated in the tournament. Teams were seeded by conference record. No tiebreakers were required as all teams finished with unique conference records.

Seed	School	Conference Record	Points
1	New Mexico State	6–0–2	20
2	Liberty	5–2–1	16
3	Western Kentucky	4–2–2	14
4	FIU	3–2–3	12
5	Sam Houston	3–3–2	11
6	Louisiana Tech	2–4–2	8

== Bracket ==
Quarterfinals; November 1
4	FIU	2
5	Sam Houston	3
3	Western Kentucky	0
6	Louisiana Tech	1

Semifinals; November 3
1	New Mexico State	2
5	Sam Houston	0
2	Liberty	4
6	Louisiana Tech	0

Championship; November 5
1	New Mexico State	1
2	Liberty	2

== Schedule ==
=== First Round ===
November 1	#4 FIU	2–3	#5 Sam Houston	Ruston, LA
4:30 p.m. CT	Nikole Solis 32'; Barbara Garcia 44'	Report	8' Kennedy Baquero; 9' Pam Murray; 13' Landri Townsend	Stadium: Caruthers Field; Referee: Elvis Osmanovic; Assistant referees: William Torres; Esteban Rosano; Fourth official: Shane Butler

November 1	#3 Western Kentucky	0–1	#6 Louisiana Tech	Ruston, LA
7:00 p.m. CT		Report	(yellow card) 37' Madita Ehrig; 40' Kalli Matlock	Stadium: Caruthers Field; Attendance: 415; Referee: Richonne Clark; Assistant referees: Gerson Lopez; Lauren Aldrich; Fourth official: Jose Cordova

=== Semifinals ===
November 3	#1 New Mexico State	2–0	#5 Sam Houston	Ruston, LA
4:30 p.m. CT	Mya Hammack (yellow card) 46'; Gianna Valenti 59', 88'; Carolina Rodriguez (yellow card) 69'; Team (yellow card) 87'	Report	(yellow card) 43' Andrea Nugent	Stadium: Caruthers Field; Referee: Shane Butler; Assistant referees: Jonathan Barnes; William Torres; Fourth official: Daniel Radford

November 3	#2 Liberty	4–0	#6 Louisiana Tech	Ruston, LA
7:00 p.m. CT	Saydie Holland 25'; Rachel DeRuby 47', 75' (pen.); Allison Hansford (yellow card) 55'; Chloe Marr 71'	Report	(yellow card) 60' Carmen Suarez; (yellow card) 75' (yellow-red card) 90' Emma Duguay	Stadium: Caruthers Field; Attendance: 610; Referee: Daniel Radford; Assistant referees: Gerson Lopez; Morgan Abbit; Fourth official: Shane Butler

=== Final ===
November 5	#1 New Mexico State	1–2	#2 Liberty	Ruston, LA
1:00 p.m. CT	Megan Ormson (yellow card) 13'; Gianna Valenti 35'; Ariana Leamons (yellow card) 80'; Xitlaly Hernandez (yellow card) 86'	Report	19' (pen.) Rachel DeRuby; 86' Saydie Holland	Stadium: Caruthers Field; Attendance: 217; Referee: Timothy Debysingh; Assistant referees: Morgan Abbit; Gerson Lopez; Fourth official: Shane Butler

== Statistics ==
=== Goalscorers ===
There were 15 goals scored in 5 matches, for an average of 3 goals per match (as of November 5, 2023).

3 goals

- Rachel DeRuby – Liberty
- Gianna Valenti – New Mexico State

2 goals

- Saydie Holland – Liberty

1 goal

- Barbara Garcia – FIU
- Nikole Solis – FIU
- Chloe Marr – Liberty
- Kalli Matlock – Louisiana Tech
- Kennedy Baquero – Sam Houston
- Pam Murray – Sam Houston
- Landri Townsend – Sam Houston

== All-Tournament team ==
Player	Team
Rachel DeRuby*	Liberty
Allison Hansford	Liberty
Saydie Holland	Liberty
Ainsley Leja^	Liberty
Xitlaly Hernandez	New Mexico State
Loma McNeese	New Mexico State
Gianna Valenti	New Mexico State
Kalli Matlock	Louisiana Tech
Josie Studer	Louisiana Tech
Andrea Nugent	Sam Houston
Landri Townsend	Sam Houston

* Offensive MVP
^ Defensive MVP
