= 2023 Missouri Valley Conference women's soccer tournament =

- Classification: Division I
- Teams: 8
- Matches: 7
- Attendance: 2,694
- Site: Cownie Sports Complex (Semifinals & Final); Des Moines, Iowa
- Champions: Valparaiso (1st title)
- Winning coach: John Marovich (1st title)
- MVP: Nikki Coryell (Valparaiso)
- Broadcast: ESPN+

2023 Missouri Valley Conference women's soccer standings
	Conf.						Overall
Team	W		L		T	PCT	W		L		T	PCT
Drake ‍†‍‍	8	–	1	–	1	.850	13	–	4	–	3	.725
Missouri State ‍‍‍	7	–	0	–	3	.850	12	–	2	–	5	.763
Northern Iowa ‍‍‍	6	–	4	–	0	.600	13	–	5	–	1	.711
UIC ‍‍‍	5	–	3	–	2	.600	6	–	8	–	5	.447
Murray State ‍‍‍	3	–	2	–	5	.550	6	–	8	–	6	.450
Valparaiso ‍‍‡‍^{y}	3	–	3	–	4	.500	11	–	6	–	6	.609
Belmont ‍‍‍	2	–	3	–	5	.450	3	–	9	–	7	.342
Evansville ‍‍‍	1	–	3	–	6	.400	1	–	7	–	9	.324
Indiana State ‍‍‍	1	–	4	–	5	.350	2	–	6	–	10	.389
Illinois State ‍‍‍	1	–	6	–	3	.250	3	–	9	–	4	.313
Southern Illinois ‍‍‍	0	–	8	–	2	.100	1	–	11	–	5	.206
† – Conference champion ‡ – 2023 Missouri Valley Tournament champion y – Invited to the NCAA Tournament; As of December 5, 2023; Rankings from United Soccer Coaches Poll; Source: Missouri Valley Conference

The 2023 Missouri Valley Conference women's soccer tournament was the postseason women's soccer tournament for the Missouri Valley Conference held from October 26 through November 5, 2023. The Opening round and Second round was held at campus sites. The semifinals and finals took place at Cownie Sports Complex in Des Moines, Iowa. The eight-team single-elimination tournament consisted of four rounds based on seeding from regular season conference play. The defending champions were the Missouri State, who were unsuccessful in defending their crown as they fell to Valparaiso in the Semifinals. Valparaiso would go on to win the tournament over top-seed Drake, 1–0 in the Final. The conference tournament title was the first for the Valparaiso women's soccer program, and first for head coach John Marovich. Valparaiso has won two conference titles previously, but they were not in the Missouri Valley Conference. As tournament champions, Valparaiso earned the Missouri Valley's automatic berth into the 2023 NCAA Division I Women's Soccer Tournament.

== Seeding ==
Eight of the eleven Missouri Valley Conference women's soccer programs qualified for the 2023 Tournament. Teams were seeded based on their regular season records. No tiebreakers were required as all teams finished with unique regular season conference records.

Seed	School	Conference Record	Points
1	Drake	8–1–1	25
2	Missouri State	7–0–3	24
3	Northern Iowa	6–4–0	18
4	UIC	5–3–2	17
5	Murray State	3–2–5	14
6	Valparaiso	3–3–4	13
7	Belmont	2–3–5	11
8	Evansville	1–3–6	9

== Bracket ==
Opening Round; Thursday, Oct. 26
5	Murray State	1
8	Evansville	0
6	Valparaiso	1
7	Belmont	0

Second Round; Sunday, Oct. 29
4	UIC (pen.)	0 (4)
5	Murray State	0 (3)
3	Northern Iowa	0
6	Valparaiso	1

Semifinals; Friday, Nov. 2
1	Drake	2
4	UIC	1
2	Missouri State	0
6	Valparaiso (a.e.t.)	1

Final; Sunday, Nov. 5
1	Drake	0
6	Valparaiso	1

== Schedule ==
=== Opening Round ===
October 26	#5 Murray State	1–0	#8 Evansville	Chicago, IL
2:00 p.m. CT	Mary Hardy 1'	Report	(yellow card) 90' Ella Hamner	Stadium: Flames Field; Attendance: 97; Referee: Dimitrios Katsimingos; Assistant referees: Adam Herges; Quinton McFarlen; Fourth official: Kerilyn O'Donnel

October 26	#6 Valparaiso	1–0	#7 Belmont	Cedar Falls, IA
2:00 p.m. CT	Lindsey Dusatko 8'; Sam Gountounas (yellow card) 69'; Team (yellow card) 74'	Report	(yellow card) 86' Anna Sweeney	Stadium: UNI Soccer Field; Attendance: 55; Referee: Cassidy Moulton; Assistant referees: Arron Valley; Robert Kerwood; Fourth official: Sean McVeigh

=== Second Round ===
October 29	#4 UIC	0–0 (a.e.t.) (4–3 p)	#5 Murray State	Chicago, IL
12:00 p.m. CT		Report		Stadium: Flames Field; Attendance: 167; Referee: Andrew Ellsworth; Assistant referees: Fernando Ibarra; Sergio Alvarez; Fourth official: Jorge Cuate Ballinas
	Penalties
	Kaysey Castro (penalty scored); Sophia Jaime (penalty scored); Katelyn Nardulli (penalty missed); Hannah Gryzik (penalty scored); Makenna Maloy (penalty missed); Madison Ferris (penalty scored)		(penalty scored) Morgan Bodker; (penalty scored) Mary Hardy; (penalty scored) Morgan Parker; (penalty missed) Megan Wilson; (penalty missed) Jenna Villacres; (penalty missed) Megan Jeremias

October 29	#3 Northern Iowa	0–1	#6 Valparaiso	Cedar Falls, IA
1:00 p.m. CT		Report	64' Kelsie James; (yellow card) 78' Sam Gountounas	Stadium: UNI Soccer Field; Attendance: 150; Referee: Eulogio Villalpando; Assistant referees: Sean Giza; Aaron Valley; Fourth official: Jacob Larson

=== Semifinals ===
November 2	#2 Missouri State	0–1 (a.e.t.)	#6 Valparaiso	Des Moines, IA
3:00 p.m. CT	Julia Kristensen (yellow card) 76'; Iraia Arrue (yellow card) 87'; Gracie English (yellow card) 89'; Team (yellow card) 89'	Report	(yellow card) 47', (goal) 97' Abby White	Stadium: Cownie Sports Complex; Attendance: 337; Referee: Khalaf Al-Latayfeh Malkawi; Assistant referees: Jared Lee; Tyler Turner; Fourth official: Sean Giza

November 2	#1 Drake	2–1	#4 UIC	Des Moines, IA
6:00 p.m. CT	Emma Nagel 5'; Angela Gutierrez 19', (yellow card) 72'; Lily Overstreet (yellow card) 59'; Maria Cervello (yellow card) 74'	Report	38' Makenna Maloy	Stadium: Cownie Sports Complex; Attendance: 616; Referee: Esad Omanovic; Assistant referees: Robert Kerwood; Jacon Larson; Fourth official: Sean Giza

=== Final ===
November 5	#1 Drake	0–1	#6 Valparaiso	Des Moines, IA
1:00 p.m. CT	Lily Overstreet (yellow card) 85'; Team (yellow card) 85'	Report	(yellow card) 67', (goal) 82' Allie Anderson; (yellow card) 90' Abby White	Stadium: Cownie Sports Complex; Attendance: 1,272; Referee: Heber Estrada; Assistant referees: Braxton Williams; Cassidy Moulton; Fourth official: Esad Omanovic

== Statistics ==
=== Goalscorers ===
There were 8 goals scored in 7 matches, for an average of 1.14 goals per match (as of November 5, 2023).

1 goal

- Angela Gutierrez – Drake
- Emma Nagel – Drake
- Mary Hardy – Murray State
- Makenna Maloy – UIC
- Allie Anderson – Valparaiso
- Lindsey Dusatko – Valparaiso
- Kelsie James – Valparaiso
- Abby White – Valparaiso

== All-Tournament team ==
Player	Team
Avery Nowak	Belmont
Maria Cervelló	Drake
Angela Gutierrez	Drake
Emma Nagel	Drake
Myia Danek	Evansville
Abby Couch	Missouri State
Maddie Schneiderhahn	Missouri State
Hannah Carter	Murray State
Ashley Harrington	Northern Iowa
Madison Ferris	UIC
Makenna Maloy	UIC
Allie Anderson	Valparaiso
**Nikki Coryell**	Valparaiso
Aubrey Ramey	Valparaiso
Abby White	Valparaiso

MVP in bold
