= 2023 SWAC women's soccer tournament =

- Classification: Division I
- Teams: 8
- Matches: 7
- Attendance: 2,177
- Site: PVA&M Soccer Stadium; Prairie View, Texas
- Champions: Grambling State (3rd title)
- Winning coach: Justin Wagar (1st title)
- MVP: Sophia Lezizidis (Grambling State)
- Broadcast: SWAC Digital Network

2023 SWAC women's soccer standings
	Conf.						Overall
Team	W		L		T	PCT	W		L		T	PCT
Grambling State ‍†‍‡‍^{y}	8	–	0	–	1	.944	15	–	5	–	4	.708
Jackson State ‍‍‍	7	–	2	–	0	.778	10	–	9	–	0	.526
Southern ‍‍‍	5	–	1	–	3	.722	8	–	6	–	4	.556
Texas Southern ‍‍‍	5	–	3	–	1	.611	7	–	13	–	1	.357
Arkansas–Pine Bluff ‍‍‍	4	–	5	–	0	.444	9	–	11	–	1	.452
Alcorn State ‍‍‍	3	–	5	–	1	.389	5	–	11	–	1	.324
Prairie View A&M ‍‍‍	3	–	5	–	1	.389	3	–	12	–	1	.219
Alabama A&M ‍‍‍	3	–	6	–	0	.333	3	–	15	–	0	.167
Alabama State ‍‍‍	1	–	6	–	2	.222	2	–	12	–	3	.206
Mississippi Valley State ‍‍‍	1	–	7	–	1	.167	2	–	11	–	1	.179
† – Conference champion ‡ – 2023 SWAC Tournament champion y – Invited to the NCAA Tournament; As of December 5, 2023; Rankings from United Soccer Coaches Poll; Source: SWAC

The 2023 SWAC women's soccer tournament was the postseason women's soccer tournament for the Southwestern Athletic Conference held November 2–5, 2023. The seven-match tournament took place at the Prairie View A&M Soccer Stadium in Prairie View, Texas. The eight-team single-elimination tournament consisted of three rounds based on seeding from regular season conference play. The defending champions were the Jackson State, however they were unable to defend their title, as they reached the Final. Top seed Grambling State defeated Jackson State 2–1 in a rematch of last years Final. The conference tournament title was the third in the history of the Grambling State women's soccer program, and first for head coach Justin Wagar. As tournament champions, Grambling State earned the SWAC's automatic berth into the 2023 NCAA Division I Women's Soccer Tournament.

== Seeding ==
Eight of the ten teams that compete in women's soccer qualified for the 2023 Tournament. Seeding was based on regular season conference play. A tiebreaker was required to determine the sixth and seventh seeds as Alcorn State and Prairie View A&M both finished with 3–5–1 regular season records. Prairie View A&M earned the sixth seed by virtue of a 2–1 regular season victory over Alcorn State on October 1.

Seed	School	Conference Record	Points
1	Grambling State	8–0–1	25
2	Jackson State	7–2–0	21
3	Southern	5–1–3	18
4	Texas Southern	5–3–1	16
5	Arkansas–Pine Bluff	4–5–0	12
6	Prairie View A&M	3–5–1	10
7	Alcorn State	3–5–1	10
8	Alabama A&M	3–6–0	9

== Bracket ==
Quarterfinals; Thursday, Nov. 2
1	Grambling State	3
8	Alabama A&M	0
4	Texas Southern	3
5	Arkansas–Pine Bluff	0
3	Southern	2
6	Prairie View A&M	0
2	Jackson State	1
7	Alcorn State	0

Semifinals; Friday, Nov. 3
1	Grambling State	3
4	Texas Southern	0
2	Jackson State	2
3	Southern	0

Final; Sunday, Nov. 5
1	Grambling State	2
2	Jackson State	1

== Schedule ==
=== Quarterfinals ===
November 2	#1 Grambling State	3–0	#8 Alabama A&M	Prairie View, TX
10:00 a.m. CT	Sophia Lezizidis 20', 50'; Beatriz Kretteis 24' (pen.)	Report		Stadium: PVA&M Soccer Stadium; Attendance: 298

November 2	#4 Texas Southern	3–0	#5 Arkansas–Pine Bluff	Prairie View, TX
1:00 p.m. CT	Isabella Dillow 39', 66' (pen.); Liliane Clase Baez 40'; Alyssa Taylor (yellow card) 71'; Kourtney Celaya (yellow card) 77'	Report	(yellow card) 62' Sydney Azuero; (yellow card) 89' Abbey Glover	Stadium: PVA&M Soccer Stadium; Attendance: 302

November 2	#2 Jackson State	1–0	#7 Alcorn State	Prairie View, TX
4:00 p.m. CT	Kendyl Terrell 28'	Report	(yellow card) 30' Jada Ward	Stadium: PVA&M Soccer Stadium; Attendance: 311

November 2	#3 Southern	2–0	#6 Prairie View A&M	Prairie View, TX
7:00 p.m. CT	Lauryn Oliver 48'; Iyanla Bailey-Williams 57'	Report	(yellow card) 63' Megan Howell; (yellow card) 86' Team	Stadium: PVA&M Soccer Stadium; Attendance: 345

=== Semifinals ===
November 3	#1 Grambling State	3–0	#4 Texas Southern	Prairie View, TX
3:00 p.m. CT	Naya Vialva 10'; Sophia Lezizidis 57'; Karlyn Judge 61'; Valentina Guzman (yellow card) 69'; Mya Joseph (yellow card) 84'	Report	(yellow card) 70' Liliane Clase Baez	Stadium: PVA&M Soccer Stadium; Attendance: 298; Referee: Sean Caoueette; Assistant referees: Albert KyeiMensah; Wes Caouette; Fourth official: Lawrence Hale

November 3	#2 Jackson State	2–0	#3 Southern	Prairie View, TX
6:00 p.m. CT	Kendyl Terrell 35'; Maya-Joy Thompson 85'	Report		Stadium: PVA&M Soccer Stadium; Attendance: 256

=== Final ===
November 5	#1 Grambling State	2–1	#2 Jackson State	Prairie View, TX
1:00 p.m. CT	Khori Banks 36'; Sophia Lezizidis 40'; Karlyn Judge (yellow card) 73'; Team (yellow card) 74'	Report	38' Harper Bennett; (yellow card) 77' Taytum Terrell; (yellow card) 77' Kendyl Terrell	Stadium: PVA&M Soccer Stadium; Attendance: 367; Referee: Wes Caouette; Assistant referees: Albert Kyei-Mensah; Bo Wims; Fourth official: Holden Gregory

== Statistics ==
=== Goalscorers ===
There were 17 goals scored in 7 matches, for an average of 2.43 goals per match (as of November 5, 2023).

4 goals

- Sophia Lezizidis – Grambling State

2 goals

- Kendyl Terrell – Jackson State
- Isabella Dillow – Texas Southern

1 goal

- Khori Banks – Grambling State
- Karlyn Judge – Grambling State
- Beatriz Kretteis – Grambling State
- Naya Vialva – Grambling State
- Harper Bennett – Jackson State
- Maya-Joy Thompson – Jackson State
- Iyanla Bailey-Williams – Southern
- Lauryn Oliver – Southern
- Liliane Clase Baez – Texas Southern

== All-Tournament team ==
Player	Team
Beatriz Kretteis	Grambling State
**Sophia Lezizidis**	Grambling State
Adrianna Pratt	Grambling State
Naya Vialva	Grambling State
Maya-Joy Thompson	Jackson State
Kendyl Terrell	Jackson State
Taytum Terrell	Jackson State
Zemira Webb	Southern
Isabella Dillow	Texas Southern
Akiya Saine	Texas Southern

MVP in bold
