= Maine Black Bears women's soccer =

American college soccer team

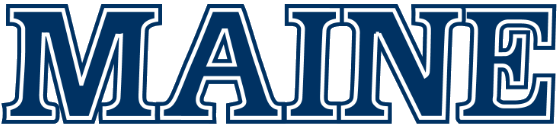
- University: University of Maine
- Nickname: Black Bears
- Colors: Maine blue, white, and navy

NCAA tournament appearances
- 2023, 2024, 2025

Conference tournament championships
- 2023, 2024, 2025

The Maine Black Bears women's soccer team represents University of Maine in NCAA Division I college soccer. Maine competes in the America East Conference.

== History ==
In 2023, 2024, and 2025, Maine women's soccer won three consecutive America East Conference titles, becoming only the second team in conference history to accomplish the feat.

In 2023, the Black Bears lost the NCAA tournament first round to Harvard, 3–0.

In 2024, Maine lost the NCAA tournament first round to Wisconsin 3–1.

Despite a 6-8-4 losing record in the 2025 season, Maine won three straight games in the 2025 America East tournament, defeating Vermont in a penalty shootout to advance to the 2025 NCAA tournament. In the NCAA tournament, they lost to UCF 2-0.
