= Liberty Lady Flames soccer =

American college soccer team

Liberty Flames women's soccer
- Founded: 1988
- University: Liberty University
- Head coach: Lang Wedemeyer
- Nickname: Flames
- Colors: Red, white, and blue

NCAA tournament appearances
- 2000, 2001, 2005, 2013, 2015, 2016, 2018, 2020, 2023, 2025

Conference tournament championships
- 2000, 2001, 2005, 2013, 2015, 2016, 2018, 2020, 2023, 2025

The Liberty Flames women's soccer team represents Liberty University in NCAA Division I college soccer. Liberty competes in Conference USA. The Flames are led by head coach Lang Wedemeyer.

== History ==
The Liberty Flames women's soccer program was founded in 1988. Beginning in 1992, Liberty competed in the Big South Conference.

In 2000, the Flames went 15–7–0 and won their first Big South Conference championship 2–0 over Elon. At the 2000 NCAA Division I women's soccer tournament, the Flames defeated Tennessee Tech 1–0 in the play-in game. Liberty lost in their first round game 6–1 to Wake Forest.

In 2001, Liberty went back-to-back at the Big South tournament and won the conference title, 2–0 over Elon. In the NCAA tournament, they lost 3–0 to Virginia in the Round of 64.

In 2005, Liberty returned to the NCAA tournament after winning the Big South title over UNC Asheville. In the NCAA tournament, the Flames lost the first round 4–0 to Virginia.

In 2013, the Flames finished 16–6–1 and defeated Radford to win the Big South tournament title. Liberty lost in the NCAA tournament first round 4–0.

In 2015, Liberty won 13 games and defeated Campbell to win the 2015 Big South title. In the NCAA tournament, the Flames lost to North Carolina 3–0.

In 2016, the Flames repeated at Big South tournament champions after beating High Point. In the 2016 NCAA tournament, the Flames again lost to North Carolina 3–0.

In 2018, the Liberty moved to the Atlantic Sun Conference (ASUN).

In 2020 (played in 2021 spring), the Flames won the ASUN tournament title over Kennesaw State. In the NCAA tournament, Liberty lost 3–0 to Washington in round 1.

For the 2023 season, Liberty moved to Conference USA. In their first CUSA season, the Flames won the CUSA conference title 2–1 over New Mexico State. In the NCAA tournament they lost the first round 2–1 to Georgia.

In 2025, Liberty beat Missouri State 3–0 to win the CUSA championship. The Flames lost in the NCAA first round to Clemson, 2–1.

== Current squad ==
As of November 2026

Note: Flags indicate national team as defined under FIFA eligibility rules; some limited exceptions apply. Players may hold more than one non-FIFA nationality.

No.	Pos.	Nation	Player
00	GK	USA	Peyton Huber
0	GK	USA	Grace Workman
1	GK	USA	Ainsley Leja
2	MF	USA	Bella Myrmel
3	FW	USA	Brooklyn Jenkins
4	FW	USA	Halle Engle
5	DF	USA	Sallie Garner
7	FW	USA	Keelyn Eslinger
8	MF	USA	Gaby Bazan
9	MF	USA	Isabella Wedemeyer
10	FW	USA	Haley Noblit
11	DF	USA	Avery Paulson
12	MF	USA	Gabby Miranda
13	DF	USA	Dani Gubbels

No.	Pos.	Nation	Player
15	MF	USA	Gabby Garnett
16	FW	USA	Lauren Flax
17	MF	USA	Avenley Monteith
18	FW	USA	Izzie Smulik
19	FW	USA	Margaret Garner
20	FW	USA	Carly Keene
21	DF	USA	Lauren Littleton
22	DF	USA	Presley Kaiser
23	DF	USA	Jentry Bertram
27	MF	USA	Audrey Heustis
28	DF	USA	Maddyson Kerley
29	DF	USA	Gabby Magee
33	DF	USA	Olivia Diez
47	GK	USA	Alden Hays
