= 2023 Duke Blue Devils women's soccer team =

American college soccer season

2023 Duke Blue Devils women's soccer
- Conference: Atlantic Coast Conference
- Record: 6–7–3 (2–5–3 ACC)
- Head coach: Robbie Church (23rd season)
- Assistant coaches: Kieran Hall (5th season); Carla Overbeck (30th season); Lane Davis (8th season)
- Home stadium: Koskinen Stadium

2023 ACC women's soccer standings
	Conf.						Overall
Team	W		L		T	PCT	W		L		T	PCT
No. 1 Florida State ‍†‍‡‍^{y}	9	–	0	–	1	.950	22	–	0	–	1	.978
No. 16 Notre Dame ‍‍‍^{y}	7	–	1	–	2	.800	12	–	4	–	4	.700
No. 3 Clemson ‍‍‍^{y}	7	–	2	–	1	.750	18	–	4	–	4	.769
No. 8 North Carolina ‍‍‍^{y}	5	–	0	–	5	.750	13	–	2	–	8	.739
No. 6 Pittsburgh ‍‍‍^{y}	6	–	3	–	1	.650	17	–	6	–	1	.729
Wake Forest ‍‍‍	4	–	2	–	4	.600	10	–	3	–	5	.694
Virginia ‍‍‍	3	–	3	–	4	.500	8	–	3	–	6	.647
Virginia Tech ‍‍‍	4	–	6	–	0	.400	7	–	8	–	3	.472
Louisville ‍‍‍	3	–	5	–	2	.400	4	–	9	–	5	.361
Duke ‍‍‍	2	–	5	–	3	.350	6	–	7	–	3	.469
NC State ‍‍‍	2	–	5	–	3	.350	3	–	9	–	6	.333
Miami (FL) ‍‍‍	2	–	7	–	1	.250	3	–	10	–	4	.294
Boston College ‍‍‍	0	–	6	–	4	.200	3	–	9	–	6	.333
Syracuse ‍‍‍	0	–	9	–	1	.050	2	–	14	–	2	.167
† – Conference champion ‡ – 2023 ACC Tournament champion y – Invited to the NCAA Tournament; Source: The ACC; As of December 5, 2023; Rankings from United Soccer Coaches Poll

The 2023 Duke Blue Devils women's soccer team represented Duke University during the 2023 NCAA Division I women's soccer season. The Blue Devils were led by head coach Robbie Church, in his twenty-third season. They played home games at Koskinen Stadium. This was the team's 36th season playing organized women's college soccer and their 35th playing in the Atlantic Coast Conference.

The Blue Devils started the season ranked 4th in the nation but faltered with a second game loss to then number 24 USC. They won their next game before falling to number 3 Stanford in California. They won their remaining two non-conference games to finish the non-conference season 4–2–0. They started ACC play with a win on September 17, but would not win another ACC game until October 19. Over that stretch, they would lose to Notre Dame, draw unranked NC State and Virginia, lose to Pittsburgh and draw their rivalry game against then number 1 North Carolina. They would lose three of their last four games. Their regular season record versus teams ranked was 0–5–1.

The Blue Devils finished 6–7–3 overall and 2–5–3 in ACC play to finish in a tie for tenth place. They did not qualify for the ACC Tournament and were not invited to the NCAA Tournament. This marked the first time since 2014 Duke had not been invited to the NCAA Tournament and first time since 2015 they had not qualified for the ACC Tournament. Their six overall wins were the lowest in program history.

== Previous season ==
The Blue Devils finished the season with a 15–5–3 overall and 6–2–2 in ACC play to finish in a tie for fourth place. As the fifth-seed in the ACC Tournament, they defeated fourth-seed Virginia in the first round, but lost to North Carolina in the semifinal. They received an at-large bid to the NCAA Tournament, where they were the second seed in the Alabama Bracket. They defeated Radford in the first round, seventh-seed Texas in the second round, and third-seed South Carolina in the round of 16 before falling in overtime to first-seed Alabama in the quarterfinals.

== Offseason ==
=== Departures ===
Departures
Name	Number	Pos.	Height	Year	Hometown	Reason for Departure
Sara Piper	5	MF	5'8"	Senior	The Woodlands, Texas	Graduated
Sophie Jones	7	MF	5'5"	Senior	Menlo Park, California	Graduated; drafted 43rd overall in the 2023 NWSL Draft
Julia Burnell	11	MF	5'5"	Senior	Glen Mills, Pennsylvania	Graduated
Emmy Duerr	13	FW	5'4"	Senior	Cary, North Carolina	Graduated
Julia Hannon	14	MF	5'7"	Senior	Massapequa, New York	Graduated
Michelle Cooper	18	FW	5'3"	Sophomore	Clarkston, Michigan	Drafted 2nd overall in the 2023 NWSL Draft
Delaney Graham	22	MF	5'6"	Graduate Student	Atlanta, GA	Graduated; drafted 40th overall in the 2023 NWSL Draft
Mackenzie Pluck	24	MF	5'4"	Graduate Student	North Wales, Pennsylvania	Graduated
Jenna Royson	25	DF	5'8"	Graduate Student	Toms River, New Jersey	Graduated
Ruthie Jones	26	GK	6'0"	Senior	Charlotte, North Carolina	Graduated

=== Incoming transfers ===
Incoming transfers
Name	Number	Pos.	Height	Year	Hometown	Previous school
Leah Freeman	0	GK	5'10"	Senior	Berkeley, California	Oregon
Julia Saunicheva	11	FW	5'10"	Sophomore	San Jose, California	UCLA
Kati Druzina	14	MF/DF	5'6"	Graduate Student	Kirtland, Ohio	Notre Dame

=== Recruiting class ===
Name	Nationality	Hometown	Club	TDS Rating
Sam Bodensteiner; DF	(United States)	Inverness, Illinois	Sockers FC	3/5 stars
Kiera Clemens; MF	(United States)	Raleigh, North Carolina	NC Courage	4/5 stars
Bianca Dominguez; GK	(United States)	Hercules, California	FC Bay Area	3/5 stars
Madison Foxhoven; FW	(United States)	Calabasas, California	LAFC So Cal	3/5 stars
Phoebe Goldthwaite; MF	(United States)	Durham, North Carolina	NC Courage	4/5 stars
Kaeden Koons-Perdikis; DF	(United States)	Chevy Chase, Maryland	Bethesda SC	3/5 stars
Mia Minestrella; FW	(United States)	Redondo Beach, California	Beach FC (CA)	4/5 stars
Cameron Roller; DF	(United States)	Sherman, Texas	Solar Soccer Club	5/5 stars

== Squad ==
=== Roster ===
As of November 20, 2023

Note: Flags indicate national team as defined under FIFA eligibility rules; some limited exceptions apply. Players may hold more than one non-FIFA nationality.

No.	Pos.	Nation	Player
0	GK	USA	Leah Freeman
1	GK	USA	Caroline Duffy
2	FW	USA	Kat Rader
3	DF	SEN	Dieynaba Ndaw
4	DF	USA	Baleigh Bruster
5	DF	USA	Phoebe Goldthwaite
6	MF	USA	Devin Lynch
7	DF	USA	Cameron Roller
8	FW	USA	Elle Piper
9	FW	USA	Grace Watkins
10	FW	USA	Olivia Migli
11	FW	USA	Julia Saunicheva
12	MF	USA	Taylor Evans

No.	Pos.	Nation	Player
13	FW	USA	Mia Minestrella
14	MF	USA	Kati Druzina
15	DF	USA	Emily Royson
16	MF	USA	Carina Lageyre
17	DF	USA	Nicole Chico
19	MF	USA	Maggie Graham
20	DF	USA	Kelly Wilson
21	DF	USA	Katie Groff
22	DF	USA	Sam Bodensteiner
23	MF	USA	Kiera Clemens
24	DF	USA	Kaeden Koons-Perdikis
25	FW	USA	Madison Foxhoven
26	GK	USA	Bianca Dominguez

=== Team management ===
Position	Staff
Head coach	Robbie Church
Assistant coach	Kieran Hall
Assistant coach	Carla Overbeck
Assistant coach	Lane Davis

== Schedule ==
Date Time, TV	Rank^{#}	Opponent^{#}	Result	Record	Site (Attendance) City, State
Exhibition
August 7*; 4:30 p.m.	No. 4	Wake Forest	W 2–0	—	Koskinen Stadium; Durham, NC
August 10*; 5:00 p.m.	No. 4	No. 12 South Carolina	W 2–1	—	Stone Stadium; Columbia, SC
Non-conference regular season
August 17*; 7:00 p.m., ACCNX	No. 4	West Virginia	W 2–0	1–0–0	Koskinen Stadium (553); Durham, NC
August 24*; 7:00 p.m., ACCNX	No. 4	No. 24 USC	L 1–3	1–1–0	Koskinen Stadium (803); Durham, NC
August 27*; 12:00 p.m., ACCNX	No. 4	Wisconsin	W 2–1	2–1–0	Koskinen Stadium (701); Durham, NC
September 2*; 10:00 p.m., P12N+	No. 10	at No. 3 Stanford	L 0–4	2–2–0	Laird Q. Cagan Stadium (2,154); Stanford, CA
September 7*; 7:00 p.m., ACCNX	No. 14	East Carolina	W 2–0	3–2–0	Koskinen Stadium (531); Durham, NC
September 11*; 6:30 p.m., ESPN+	No. 14	at UNC Greensboro	W 1–0	4–2–0	UNCG Soccer Stadium (562); Greensboro, NC
ACC regular season
September 17; 1:00 p.m., ACCNX	No. 15	at Boston College	W 2–0	5–2–0 (1–0–0)	Newton Campus Soccer Field (627); Chestnut Hill, MA
September 21; 7:00 p.m., ACCNX	No. 16	No. 10 Notre Dame	L 1–2	5–3–0 (1–1–0)	Koskinen Stadium (803); Durham, NC
September 24; 6:00 p.m., ACCNX	No. 16	NC State	T 0–0	5–3–1 (1–1–1)	Koskinen Stadium (786); Durham, NC
October 1; 12:00 p.m., ACCNX	No. 17	at Virginia	T 1–1	5–3–2 (1–1–2)	Klöckner Stadium (1,817); Charlottesville, VA
October 5; 7:00 p.m., ACCNX	No. 22	at Pittsburgh	L 1–2	5–4–2 (1–2–2)	Ambrose Urbanic Field (958); Pittsburgh, PA
October 8; 4:00 p.m., ACCN	No. 22	No. 1 North Carolina; Rivalry	T 1–1	5–4–3 (1–2–3)	Koskinen Stadium (3,467); Durham, NC
October 13; 5:00 p.m., ACCNX	No. 23	No. 7 Clemson	L 0–1	5–5–3 (1–3–3)	Koskinen Stadium (1,457); Durham, NC
October 19; 7:00 p.m., ACCNX		at Virginia Tech	W 1–0	6–5–3 (2–3–3)	Thompson Field (210); Blacksburg, VA
October 22; 1:00 p.m., ACCNX		No. 1 Florida State	L 0–4	6–6–3 (2–4–3)	Koskinen Stadium (803); Durham, NC
October 26; 6:00 p.m., ACCNX	No. 25т	at Louisville	L 0–1	6–7–3 (2–5–3)	Lynn Stadium (405); Louisville, KY
*Non-conference game. ^{#}Rankings from United Soccer Coaches. (#) Tournament seedings in parentheses. All times are in Eastern.

== Awards and honors ==
Recipient	Award	Date	Ref.
Kat Rader	Preseason All-ACC Team	August 10	
Leah Freeman	Hermann Trophy Preseason Watchlist	August 17	
Carina Lageyre	ACC Offensive Player of the Week	September 19	
Kat Rader	All-ACC Second Team	November 1	
Leah Freeman	All-ACC Third Team	November 1	
Cameron Roller	All-ACC Freshman Team	November 1	

== Rankings ==
Ranking movements Legend: ██ Increase in ranking ██ Decrease in ranking — = Not ranked RV = Received votes т = Tied with team above or below
	Week																
Poll	Pre	1	2	3	4	5	6	7	8	9	10	11	12	13	14	15	Final
United Soccer	4	4	10	14	15	16	17	22	23	RV	25т	—	Not released				—
TopDrawer Soccer	8	7	10	12	8	7	19	—	—	—	—	—	—	—	—	—	—
