= 2023 ACC women's soccer tournament =

Soccer tournament

- Classification: Division I
- Teams: 6
- Matches: 5
- Attendance: 2,648
- Quarterfinals site: Campus Sites
- Semifinals site: WakeMed Soccer Park; Cary, North Carolina
- Finals site: WakeMed Soccer Park; Cary, North Carolina
- Champions: Florida State (10th title)
- Winning coach: Brian Pensky (2nd title)
- MVP: Onyi Echegini (Florida State)
- Broadcast: ACCN (Quarterfinals & Semifinals), ESPNU (Final)

2023 ACC women's soccer standings
	Conf.						Overall
Team	W		L		T	PCT	W		L		T	PCT
No. 1 Florida State ‍†‍‡‍^{y}	9	–	0	–	1	.950	22	–	0	–	1	.978
No. 16 Notre Dame ‍‍‍^{y}	7	–	1	–	2	.800	12	–	4	–	4	.700
No. 3 Clemson ‍‍‍^{y}	7	–	2	–	1	.750	18	–	4	–	4	.769
No. 8 North Carolina ‍‍‍^{y}	5	–	0	–	5	.750	13	–	2	–	8	.739
No. 6 Pittsburgh ‍‍‍^{y}	6	–	3	–	1	.650	17	–	6	–	1	.729
Wake Forest ‍‍‍	4	–	2	–	4	.600	10	–	3	–	5	.694
Virginia ‍‍‍	3	–	3	–	4	.500	8	–	3	–	6	.647
Virginia Tech ‍‍‍	4	–	6	–	0	.400	7	–	8	–	3	.472
Louisville ‍‍‍	3	–	5	–	2	.400	4	–	9	–	5	.361
Duke ‍‍‍	2	–	5	–	3	.350	6	–	7	–	3	.469
NC State ‍‍‍	2	–	5	–	3	.350	3	–	9	–	6	.333
Miami (FL) ‍‍‍	2	–	7	–	1	.250	3	–	10	–	4	.294
Boston College ‍‍‍	0	–	6	–	4	.200	3	–	9	–	6	.333
Syracuse ‍‍‍	0	–	9	–	1	.050	2	–	14	–	2	.167
† – Conference champion ‡ – 2023 ACC Tournament champion y – Invited to the NCAA Tournament; Source: The ACC; As of December 5, 2023; Rankings from United Soccer Coaches Poll

The 2023 Atlantic Coast Conference women's soccer tournament was the post season women's soccer tournament for the Atlantic Coast Conference and was held from October 29 through November 5, 2023. The five-match tournament took place at campus sites for the quarterfinals and WakeMed Soccer Park in Cary, North Carolina for the semifinals and final. The higher seed hosted the campus site matches. The six-team single-elimination tournament consisted of three rounds based on seeding from regular season conference play. The Florida State Seminoles were the three-time defending champions. Florida State successfully defended its title after defeating the Clemson Tigers 2–1 in the final. This was Florida State's tenth overall title, and fourth title in a row. It was head coach Brian Pensky's second consecutive title. As tournament champions, Florida State earned the ACC's automatic berth into the 2023 NCAA Division I women's soccer tournament.

== Qualification ==
The top six teams in the Atlantic Coast Conference earned a berth into the ACC Tournament. The top two teams earned a bye to the semifinals. The final seedings were determined after the final day of the regular season on October 26, 2023. There were no tiebreakers required as the top seven teams in conference play had unique conference point totals.

Seed	School	Conference Record	Points
1	Florida State	9–0–1	28
2	Notre Dame	7–1–2	23
3	Clemson	7–2–1	22
4	North Carolina	5–0–5	20
5	Pittsburgh	6–3–1	19
6	Wake Forest	4–2–4	16

== Bracket ==
First Round; October 29; ACCN
4	North Carolina	1
5	Pittsburgh (a.e.t.)	2
3	Clemson	1
6	Wake Forest	0

Semifinal; November 2 ACCN
1	Florida State	2
5	Pittsburgh	0
2	Notre Dame	2
3	Clemson	3

Championship; November 5 ESPNU
1	Florida State	2
3	Clemson	1

== Schedule ==
=== First round ===
October 29, 2023	#3 Clemson	1–0	#6 Wake Forest	Clemson, SC
6:00 p.m. EDT	Mackenzie Duff 2'; Jenna Tobia (yellow card) 42'	Report	(yellow card) 31' Nikayla Small	Stadium: Riggs Field; Attendance: 795; Referee: Lucas Feathers; Assistant referees: Rick Rogers; Jarred Mosher; Fourth official: Kayla Polonsky

October 29, 2023	#4 North Carolina	1–2 (a.e.t.)	#5 Pittsburgh	Chapel Hill, NC
8:00 p.m. EDT	Ally Sentnor 76'	Report	73' Ellie Coffield; 99' Amanda West	Stadium: Dorrance Field; Attendance: 1,174; Referee: Ashley Cedro; Assistant referees: Raymond Thomas; Justin Howard; Fourth official: Aaron Riley

=== Semifinals ===
November 2, 2023	#2 Notre Dame	2–3	#3 Clemson	Cary, North Carolina
5:30 p.m. EDT	Erin Hohnstein (yellow card) 34'; Team (yellow card) 34', (yellow card) 67'; Maddie Mercado 50'; Sophia Fisher (yellow card) 65'; Morgan Roy 74'	Report	Hal Hershfelt (yellow card) 18'; Megan Bornkamp 24', (yellow card) 68'; Tatum Short 53'; Caroline Conti 65' (pen.)	Stadium: WakeMed Soccer Park; Referee: Katherine McCormick; Assistant referees: Katie Mitchell; Audra Fullen; Fourth official: Taylor Bombalski

November 2, 2023	#1 Florida State	2–0	#5 Pittsburgh	Cary, North Carolina
8:00 p.m. EDT	Jordynn Dudley 70'; Beata Olsson 75'	Report	(yellow card) 23' Keera Melenhorst; (yellow card) 35' Samiah Phiri	Stadium: WakeMed Soccer Park; Attendance: 678; Referee: Nicole Green; Assistant referees: Rachel Smith; Kayla Polonsky; Fourth official: Taylor Bombalski

=== Final ===
November 5, 2023	#1 Florida State	2–1	#3 Clemson	Cary, North Carolina
12:00 p.m. EST	Onyi Echegini 7', 57'; Beata Olsson (yellow card) 63'; Lauren Flynn (yellow card) 70'	Report	(yellow card) 9' Caroline Conti; (yellow card) 9', (yellow card) 74' Team; 29' Mackenzie Duff	Stadium: WakeMed Soccer Park; Attendance: 1 Referee: Meghan Mullen; Assistant referees: Mandy Love; Miriama Kocisova; Fourth official: Sharon Gingrich

== Statistics ==
=== Goalscorers ===
There were 14 goals scored in 5 matches, for an average of 2.8 goals per match.

2 goals

- Onyi Echegini – Florida State
- Mackenzie Duff – Clemson

1 goal

- Megan Bornkamp – Clemson
- Caroline Conti – Clemson
- Jordynn Dudley – Florida State
- Beata Olsson – Florida State
- Ally Sentnor – North Carolina
- Maddie Mercado – Notre Dame
- Morgan Roy – Notre Dame
- Ellie Coffield – Pittsburgh
- Amanda West – Pittsburgh

== All-Tournament team ==
Player	Team
**Onyi Echegini**	Florida State
Cristina Roque	Florida State
Beata Olsson	Florida State
Jordynn Dudley	Florida State
Mimi Van Zanten	Florida State
Halle Mackiewicz	Clemson
Dani Davis	Clemson
Mackenzie Duff	Clemson
Amanda West	Pittsburgh
Landy Mertz	Pittsburgh
Maddie Mercado	Notre Dame

MVP in bold
