= 2023 Wake Forest Demon Deacons women's soccer team =

American college soccer season

2023 Wake Forest Demon Deacons women's soccer
- Conference: Atlantic Coast Conference
- Record: 10–3–5 (4–2–4 ACC)
- Head coach: Tony da Luz (27th season)
- Assistant coaches: Brittany Cameron (4th season); Courtney Drummond (2nd season)
- Home stadium: Spry Stadium

2023 ACC women's soccer standings
	Conf.						Overall
Team	W		L		T	PCT	W		L		T	PCT
No. 1 Florida State ‍†‍‡‍^{y}	9	–	0	–	1	.950	22	–	0	–	1	.978
No. 16 Notre Dame ‍‍‍^{y}	7	–	1	–	2	.800	12	–	4	–	4	.700
No. 3 Clemson ‍‍‍^{y}	7	–	2	–	1	.750	18	–	4	–	4	.769
No. 8 North Carolina ‍‍‍^{y}	5	–	0	–	5	.750	13	–	2	–	8	.739
No. 6 Pittsburgh ‍‍‍^{y}	6	–	3	–	1	.650	17	–	6	–	1	.729
Wake Forest ‍‍‍	4	–	2	–	4	.600	10	–	3	–	5	.694
Virginia ‍‍‍	3	–	3	–	4	.500	8	–	3	–	6	.647
Virginia Tech ‍‍‍	4	–	6	–	0	.400	7	–	8	–	3	.472
Louisville ‍‍‍	3	–	5	–	2	.400	4	–	9	–	5	.361
Duke ‍‍‍	2	–	5	–	3	.350	6	–	7	–	3	.469
NC State ‍‍‍	2	–	5	–	3	.350	3	–	9	–	6	.333
Miami (FL) ‍‍‍	2	–	7	–	1	.250	3	–	10	–	4	.294
Boston College ‍‍‍	0	–	6	–	4	.200	3	–	9	–	6	.333
Syracuse ‍‍‍	0	–	9	–	1	.050	2	–	14	–	2	.167
† – Conference champion ‡ – 2023 ACC Tournament champion y – Invited to the NCAA Tournament; Source: The ACC; As of December 5, 2023; Rankings from United Soccer Coaches Poll

The 2023 Wake Forest Demon Deacons women's soccer team represented Wake Forest University during the 2023 NCAA Division I women's soccer season. The Demon Deacons were led by head coach Tony da Luz, in his twenty-seventh season. They played their home games at Spry Stadium. This was the team's 29th season playing organized women's college soccer, all of which have been played in the Atlantic Coast Conference.

The Demon Deacons started the season well, winning their opening match versus Appalachian State. However, they only managed to tie their next game with Army. That tie would be the only blemish on their non-conference record. Their final record of 6–0–1 included wins over two Power 5 teams. Their ACC season started with a loss to a ranked Notre Dame, a tie, and a win against 22nd ranked Virginia. This earned them a spot in the rankings at number 25. After winning their next game, they moved up to number 17. However, they then hit a rough patch drawing three of the next four games and losing the other game to Pittsburgh. The loss saw them fall out of the rankings. They finished the season with two wins.

The Demon Deacons finished the season 10–2–5 overall and 4–2–4 in ACC ACC play to finish in sixth place. They qualified for the ACC Tournament, and lost in the First Round to Clemson. They were not invited to the NCAA Tournament.

== Previous season ==
The Demon Deacons finished the season 9–7–3 overall and 3–6–1 in ACC ACC play to finish in ninth place. They were not invited to the ACC Tournament, but did receive an at-large invitation to the NCAA Tournament. As an unseeded team in the Alabama Bracket, they had a First Round match at South Carolina, which they lost 2–0 to end their season.

== Offseason ==
=== Departures ===
Departures
Name	Number	Pos.	Height	Year	Hometown	Reason for departure
Kaitlyn Parks	1	GK	5'7"	(redshirt) Junior	Upper Marlboro, Maryland	Transferred to Michigan State
Giovanna DeMarco	3	MF	5'7"	Graduate Student	Gwynedd Valley, Pennsylvania	Graduated; drafted 45th overall in the 2023 NWSL Draft
Courtney Evans	5	DF	—	Freshman	Springfield, Virginia	—
Madeline Allburn	6	MF	5'8"	(redshirt) Junior	Ashburn, Virginia	Graduated
Brooke Potter	15	FW	5'5"	Freshman	Williamsburg, Virginia	Transferred to James Madison
Lyndon Wood	19	MF	5'9"	Senior	Raleigh, North Carolina	Graduated
Aisha Polk	36	MF	—	Freshman	Dallas, Texas	—
Chidubem Dike	99	FW	5'7"	Freshman	Greenville, South Carolina	Transferred to South Carolina

=== Incoming transfers ===
Incoming transfers
Name	Number	Pos.	Height	Year	Hometown	Previous school
Emily Murphy	35	FW	5'6"	Junior	Windsor, England	North Carolina

=== Recruiting class ===
Name	Nationality	Hometown	Club	TDS Rating
Valentina Amaral; GK	(United States)	Oviedo, Florida	Florida Kraze	4/5 stars
Sarah Brown; MF	(United States)	Winter Park, Florida	Orlando City (ECNL)	3/5 stars
Mary Jane Osborne; MF	(United States)	Los Altos Hills, California	Mountain View Los Altos SC	3/5 stars
Sierra Sythe; FW	(United States)	Long Beach, California	Beach FC (CA)	4/5 stars
Samantha Wiemann; DF	(United States)	San Diego, California	San Diego Surf	2/5 stars

== Squad ==
=== Roster ===
As of November 28, 2023

Note: Flags indicate national team as defined under FIFA eligibility rules; some limited exceptions apply. Players may hold more than one non-FIFA nationality.

No.	Pos.	Nation	Player
00	GK	USA	Madison Howard
1	GK	USA	Valentina Amaral
2	MF	USA	Reese Kim
4	MF	CAN	Nikayla Small
5	DF	USA	MJ Osborne
6	MF	USA	Dempsey Brown
7	DF	ISL	Kristin Johnson
8	MF	USA	Kristi Vierra
9	MF	USA	Caiya Hanks
10	MF	ENG	Malaika Meena
11	FW	USA	Liv Stowell
13	MF	USA	Emily Morris
14	FW	USA	Carrie McIntire
15	DF	USA	Sammi Wiemann
16	FW	USA	Alex Wood
17	DF	USA	Tyla Ochoa
18	DF	USA	Kate Dobsch
19	FW	USA	Sierra Sythe

No.	Pos.	Nation	Player
20	FW	USA	Hannah Johnson
21	MF	USA	Baylor Goldthwaite
22	DF	USA	Sasha Schwartz
23	DF	USA	Allie Schmidt
24	DF	USA	Zara Chavoshi
25	MF	USA	Sophie Faircloth
26	DF	USA	Taryn Chance
27	DF	USA	Nadia DeMarinis
28	MF	USA	Carly Wilson
29	DF	USA	Olivia DeMarinis
30	MF	USA	Anna Swanson
31	MF	USA	Olivia Duvall
32	MF	USA	Emily Silva
33	DF	USA	Abbie Colton
34	DF	USA	Laurel Ansbrow
35	FW	ENG	Emily Murphy
39	DF	USA	Laine Denatale
88	GK	USA	Peyton Cahill

=== Team management ===
Position	Staff
Head coach	Tony da Luz
Associate Head Coach	Brittany Cameron
Assistant Coach	Courtney Drummond

== Schedule ==
Date Time, TV	Rank^{#}	Opponent^{#}	Result	Record	Site City, State
Non-conference regular season
August 17*; 7:00 p.m., ACCNX		Appalachian State	W 1–0	1–0–0	Spry Stadium (751); Winston-Salem, NC
August 20*; 12:00 p.m., ACCNX		Army	T 1–1	1–0–1	Spry Stadium (689); Winston-Salem, NC
August 24*; 1:00 p.m., ACCNX		Idaho State	W 3–0	2–0–1	Spry Stadium (484); Winston-Salem, NC
August 27*; 1:00 p.m., BTN+		at Purdue	W 2–0	3–0–1	Folk Field (581); West Lafayette, IN
August 31*; 6:30 p.m., SECN+		at Auburn	W 2–0	4–0–1	Auburn Soccer Complex (780); Auburn, AL
September 3*; 1:00 p.m., ACCNX		Iona	W 6–0	5–0–1	Spry Stadium (748); Winston-Salem, NC
September 7*; 7:00 p.m.		at Rhode Island	W 3–1	6–0–1	URI Soccer Complex (75); Kingston, RI
September 10*; 12:00 p.m., ESPN+		at Brown	Canceled		Stevenson Field; Providence, RI
ACC regular season
September 15; 7:00 p.m., ACCNX		at No. 13 Notre Dame	L 1–3	6–1–1 (0–0–1)	Alumni Stadium (1,372); Notre Dame, IN
September 21; 8:00 p.m., ACCNX		NC State	T 1–1	6–1–2 (0–1–1)	Spry Stadium (762); Winston-Salem, NC
September 24; 2:00 p.m., ACCNX		No. 22 Virginia	W 2–0	7–1–2 (1–1–1)	Spry Stadium (710); Winston-Salem, NC
September 29; 7:00 p.m., ACCNX	No. 25	at Virginia Tech	W 2–0	8–1–2 (2–1–1)	Thompson Field (1,107); Blacksburg, VA
October 5; 6:00 p.m., ACCN	No. 17	at Syracuse	T 2–2	8–1–3 (2–1–2)	SU Soccer Stadium (153); Syracuse, NY
October 8; 1:00 p.m., ACCNX	No. 17	at Pittsburgh	L 1–4	8–2–3 (2–2–2)	Ambrose Urbanic Field (545); Pittsburgh, PA
October 13; 7:00 p.m., ACCNX		No. 3 North Carolina	T 1–1	8–2–4 (2–2–3)	Spry Stadium (1,280); Winston-Salem, NC
October 19; 6:00 p.m., ACCN		Boston College	T 1–1	8–2–5 (2–2–4)	Spry Stadium (606); Winston-Salem, NC
October 22; 12:30 p.m., ACCNX		Louisville	W 1–0	9–2–5 (3–2–4)	Spry Stadium (620); Winston-Salem, NC
October 26; 6:00 p.m., ACCN		at Miami (FL)	W 2–0	10–2–5 (4–2–4)	Cobb Stadium (196); Coral Gables, FL
ACC tournament
October 29; 6:00 p.m., ACCN	(6)	at (3) No. 8 Clemson; First Round	L 0–1	10–3–5	Riggs Field (795); Clemson, SC
*Non-conference game. ^{#}Rankings from United Soccer Coaches. (#) Tournament seedings in parentheses.

== Awards and honors ==
Recipient	Award	Date	Ref.
Laurel Ansbrow	ACC Defensive Player of the Week	October 3	
Caiya Hanks	All-ACC Second Team	November 1	
Dempsey Brown	All-ACC Freshman Team	November 1	

== Rankings ==
Ranking movements Legend: ██ Increase in ranking ██ Decrease in ranking — = Not ranked RV = Received votes
	Week																
Poll	Pre	1	2	3	4	5	6	7	8	9	10	11	12	13	14	15	Final
United Soccer	—	—	—	RV	RV	—	25	17	—	RV	RV	25	Not released				—
TopDrawer Soccer	—	—	—	—	—	—	—	25	—	—	—	—	—	—	—	—	—
