= 2023 Virginia Cavaliers women's soccer team =

American college soccer season

2023 Virginia Cavaliers women's soccer
- Conference: Atlantic Coast Conference
- Record: 8–3–6 (3–3–4 ACC)
- Head coach: Steve Swanson (24th season)
- Assistant coaches: Ron Raab (18th season); Sam Raper (2nd season)
- Home stadium: Klöckner Stadium

2023 ACC women's soccer standings
	Conf.						Overall
Team	W		L		T	PCT	W		L		T	PCT
No. 1 Florida State ‍†‍‡‍^{y}	9	–	0	–	1	.950	22	–	0	–	1	.978
No. 16 Notre Dame ‍‍‍^{y}	7	–	1	–	2	.800	12	–	4	–	4	.700
No. 3 Clemson ‍‍‍^{y}	7	–	2	–	1	.750	18	–	4	–	4	.769
No. 8 North Carolina ‍‍‍^{y}	5	–	0	–	5	.750	13	–	2	–	8	.739
No. 6 Pittsburgh ‍‍‍^{y}	6	–	3	–	1	.650	17	–	6	–	1	.729
Wake Forest ‍‍‍	4	–	2	–	4	.600	10	–	3	–	5	.694
Virginia ‍‍‍	3	–	3	–	4	.500	8	–	3	–	6	.647
Virginia Tech ‍‍‍	4	–	6	–	0	.400	7	–	8	–	3	.472
Louisville ‍‍‍	3	–	5	–	2	.400	4	–	9	–	5	.361
Duke ‍‍‍	2	–	5	–	3	.350	6	–	7	–	3	.469
NC State ‍‍‍	2	–	5	–	3	.350	3	–	9	–	6	.333
Miami (FL) ‍‍‍	2	–	7	–	1	.250	3	–	10	–	4	.294
Boston College ‍‍‍	0	–	6	–	4	.200	3	–	9	–	6	.333
Syracuse ‍‍‍	0	–	9	–	1	.050	2	–	14	–	2	.167
† – Conference champion ‡ – 2023 ACC Tournament champion y – Invited to the NCAA Tournament; Source: The ACC; As of December 5, 2023; Rankings from United Soccer Coaches Poll

The 2023 Virginia Cavaliers women's soccer team represented the University of Virginia during the 2023 NCAA Division I women's soccer season. The Cavaliers were led by head coach Steve Swanson, in his twenty-fourth season. They played home games at Klöckner Stadium. This was the team's 38th season playing organized women's college soccer and their 36th playing in the Atlantic Coast Conference.

The Cavaliers played only three Power 5 opponents in their non-conference season and finished 1–0–2 against those opponents. They began the season ranked number 5, but finished the non-conference season ranked number 18 after the draws against Michigan and Iowa. The Cavaliers finished non-conference with a 5–0–2 record. ACC play started with a draw against Louisville. That was followed by two losses, two more draws, and a loss. However, the Cavaliers did play three ranked teams over that stretch. After a September 24 loss to Wake Forest, they dropped out of the United Soccer Coaches poll. The Cavaliers wouldn't return to the rankings for the rest of the season despite winning three of their last four games.

The Cavaliers finished the season 8–3–6 overall and 3–3–4 in ACC play to finish in seventh place. They did not qualify for the ACC Tournament and were not invited to the NCAA Tournament. This was the first time the team did not qualify for the ACC tournament since its inception. It was also their first time not making the NCAA tournament since 1993, breaking a streak of twenty-nine straight tournaments. Their eight total wins were tied for the lowest in program history with their 1986 campaign and their three conference wins were their lowest since 2003.

== Previous season ==
The Cavaliers finished 16–4–3 overall and 6–2–2 in ACC play to finish in a tie for fourth place. As the fourth-seed in the ACC Tournament, they hosted Duke in the First Round and lost 2–1. They received an at-large bid to the NCAA Tournament, where they were the third-seed in the UCLA Bracket. They defeated Fairleigh Dickinson in the First Round, Xavier in the Second Round, two-seed Penn State in the Round of 16 before falling to eventual champions UCLA in the Quarterfinals to end their season.

== Offseason ==
=== Departures ===
Departures
Name	Number	Pos.	Height	Year	Hometown	Reason for departure
Michaela Moran	1	GK	5'8"	Graduate Student	Greeley, Colorado	Graduated
Jansen Eichenlaub	6	FW/MF	5'5"	Senior	Bloomfield Hills, Michigan	Graduated
Alexa Spaanstra	7	FW	5'5"	Graduate Student	Brighton, Michigan	Graduated; drafted 10th overall in the 2023 NWSL Draft
Sarah Clark	8	DF	5'6"	Graduate Student	Brighton, Michigan	Graduated
Claire Constant	12	DF	5'7"	Graduate Student	Alexandria, Virginia	Graduated
Rebecca Jarrett	13	FW	5'6"	Graduate Student	Washington Township, New Jersey	Graduated
Haley Hopkins	17	FW	5'10"	Graduate Student	Newport Beach, California	Graduated; drafted 11th overall in the 2023 NWSL Draft
Charlotte McClure	24	MF	5'5"	Sophomore	Ridgeland, South Carolina	Transferred to Florida
Maggie Fralin	27	MF	5'5"	Junior	Richmond, Virginia	Transferred to Maryland
Grace Santos	28	MF	5'7"	Junior	Charlottesville, Virginia	—
Ally Reynolds	33	GK	5'7"	Sophomore	Los Angeles, California	—

=== Incoming transfers ===
Incoming transfers
Name	Number	Pos.	Height	Year	Hometown	Previous school
Kathryn Kelly	24	DF	5'8"	Sophomore	Belmont, California	UCLA

=== Recruiting class ===
Name	Nationality	Hometown	Club	TDS Rating
Ella Carter; MF	(United States)	Leesburg, Virginia	TSJ FC Virginia	4/5 stars
Aniyah Collier; DF	(United States)	Loganville, Georgia	GSA (ECNL U16)	4/5 stars
Yuna McCormack; MF	(United States)	Mill Valley, California	FC Bay Area	5/5 stars
Alexandra Ross; FW	(United States)	Atlanta, Georgia	Concorde Fire SC	4/5 stars
Victoria Safradin; GK	(United States)	Eastlake, Ohio	Internationals SC (OH)	5/5 stars

== Squad ==
=== Roster ===
As of November 27, 2023

Note: Flags indicate national team as defined under FIFA eligibility rules; some limited exceptions apply. Players may hold more than one non-FIFA nationality.

No.	Pos.	Nation	Player
0	GK	USA	Cayla White
1	GK	USA	Victoria Safradin
2	MF	USA	Peyton Goldthwaite
3	MF	USA	Alexis Theoret
4	DF	USA	Kiki Maki
5	MF	USA	Laughlin Ryan
6	FW	USA	Degen Miller
7	MF	USA	Yuna McCormack
8	FW	USA	Allie Ross
9	FW	USA	Meredith McDermott
10	FW	USA	Maggie Cagle
11	MF	USA	Lacey McCormack
12	DF	USA	Aniyah Collier
13	DF	USA	Helen Symbas

No.	Pos.	Nation	Player
14	MF	USA	Emma Dawson
15	FW	USA	Brianna Jablonowski
16	MF	USA	Ella Carter
17	DF	USA	Tatum Galvin
18	FW	USA	Sarah Brunner
19	MF	USA	Jill Flammia
20	DF	USA	Talia Staude
21	MF	USA	Chloe Japic
22	MF	USA	Lia Godfrey
23	DF	USA	Laney Rouse
24	DF	USA	Kathryn Kelly
25	DF	USA	Samar Guidry
26	FW	USA	Maya Carter
29	GK	USA	Camryn Miller

=== Team management ===
Position	Staff
Athletic Director	Carla Williams
Head Coach	Steve Swanson
Associate head coach	Ron Raab
Assistant Coach	Sam Raper
Assistant Coach	Lizzy Sieracki
Director of Operations	Eilidh Thomson

== Schedule ==
Date Time, TV	Rank^{#}	Opponent^{#}	Result	Record	Site (Attendance) City, State
Exhibition
August 8*; 12:00 p.m.	No. 5	vs. No. 3 Notre Dame	L 1–3	–	Central Michigan Soccer Complex; Maple City, MI
August 13*; 12:00 p.m.	No. 5	at Ohio State	None Reported	–	Jesse Owens Memorial Stadium; Columbus, OH
Non-conference Regular season
August 17*; 7:00 p.m., ACCNX	No. 5	Nevada	W 5–0	1–0–0	Klöckner Stadium (1,199); Charlottesville, VA
August 20*; 6:00 p.m., ACCNX	No. 5	Radford	W 5–0	2–0–0	Klöckner Stadium (1,390); Charlottesville, VA
August 24*; 8:00 p.m.15, ACCNX	No. 5	Michigan	T 0–0	2–0–1	Klöckner Stadium (1,684); Charlottesville, VA
August 27*; 6:00 p.m., ESPN+	No. 5	at George Mason	W 4–0	3–0–1	George Mason Stadium (928); Fairfax, VA
August 31*; 6:00 p.m., ACCNX	No. 12	West Virginia	W 2–1	4–0–1	Klöckner Stadium (1,497); Charlottesville, VA
September 3*; 3:00 p.m., ACCNX	No. 12	VCU	W 4–1	5–0–1	Klöckner Stadium (1,172); Charlottesville, VA
September 7*; 7:00 p.m., ACCNX	No. 18	Iowa	T 0–0	5–0–2	Klöckner Stadium (1,345); Charlottesville, VA
ACC regular season
September 16; 7:00 p.m., ACCNX	No. 20	at Louisville	T 1–1	5–0–3 (0–0–1)	Lynn Stadium (221); Louisville, KY
September 21; 7:00 p.m., ACCNX	No. 22	No. 1 North Carolina	L 0–1	5–1–3 (0–1–1)	Klöckner Stadium (2,674); Charlottesville, VA
September 24; 2:00 p.m., ACCNX	No. 22	at Wake Forest	L 0–2	5–2–3 (0–2–1)	Spry Stadium (710); Winston-Salem, NC
October 1; 12:00 p.m., ACCNX		No. 17 Duke	T 1–1	5–2–4 (0–2–2)	Klöckner Stadium (1,817); Charlottesville, VA
October 5; 7:00 p.m., ACCNX		at No. 9 Clemson	T 1–1	5–2–5 (0–2–3)	Riggs Field (583); Clemson, SC
October 8; 2:00 p.m., ACCN		at NC State	L 1–2	5–3–5 (0–3–3)	Dail Soccer Field (252); Raleigh, NC
October 15; 1:30 p.m., ACCN		Virginia Tech; Rivalry	W 3–0	6–3–5 (1–3–3)	Klöckner Stadium (2,184); Charlottesville, VA
October 19; 7:00 p.m., ACCNX		Miami (FL)	W 1–0	7–3–5 (2–3–3)	Klöckner Stadium (1,419); Charlottesville, VA
October 22; 2:00 p.m., ACCNX		Boston College	T 1–1	7–3–6 (2–3–4)	Klöckner Stadium (1,415); Charlottesville, VA
October 26; 7:00 p.m., ACCNX		at Syracuse	W 4–0	8–3–6 (3–3–4)	SU Soccer Stadium (102); Syracuse, NY
*Non-conference game. ^{#}Rankings from United Soccer Coaches. (#) Tournament seedings in parentheses. All times are in Eastern.

== Awards and honors ==
Recipient	Award	Date	Ref.
Maggie Cagle	Pre-season All-ACC Team	August 10	
Lia Godfrey	Hermann Trophy Preseason Watchlist	August 17	
Meredith McDermott	ACC Offensive Player of the Week	September 5	
Maggie Cagle	All-ACC Second Team	November 1	
Yuna McCormack	All-ACC Freshman Team	November 1	

== Rankings ==
Ranking movements Legend: ██ Increase in ranking ██ Decrease in ranking — = Not ranked
	Week																
Poll	Pre	1	2	3	4	5	6	7	8	9	10	11	12	13	14	15	Final
United Soccer	5	5	12	18	20	22	—	—	—	—	—	—	Not released				—
TopDrawer Soccer	6	6	7	7	10	15	—	—	—	—	—	—	—	—	—	—	—

== 2024 NWSL Draft ==
Player	Team	Round	Pick #	Position
(United States) Natalia Staude	North Carolina Courage	2	24	DF
