= 2023 Boston College Eagles women's soccer team =

American college soccer season

2023 Boston College Eagles women's soccer
- Conference: Atlantic Coast Conference
- Record: 3–9–6 (0–6–4 ACC)
- Head coach: Jason Lowe (5th season)
- Assistant coaches: Dirk Vandeveer (2nd season); Stephanie Demake (1st season); Paige Forster (1st season)
- Home stadium: Newton Campus Soccer Field

2023 ACC women's soccer standings
	Conf.						Overall
Team	W		L		T	PCT	W		L		T	PCT
No. 1 Florida State ‍†‍‡‍^{y}	9	–	0	–	1	.950	22	–	0	–	1	.978
No. 16 Notre Dame ‍‍‍^{y}	7	–	1	–	2	.800	12	–	4	–	4	.700
No. 3 Clemson ‍‍‍^{y}	7	–	2	–	1	.750	18	–	4	–	4	.769
No. 8 North Carolina ‍‍‍^{y}	5	–	0	–	5	.750	13	–	2	–	8	.739
No. 6 Pittsburgh ‍‍‍^{y}	6	–	3	–	1	.650	17	–	6	–	1	.729
Wake Forest ‍‍‍	4	–	2	–	4	.600	10	–	3	–	5	.694
Virginia ‍‍‍	3	–	3	–	4	.500	8	–	3	–	6	.647
Virginia Tech ‍‍‍	4	–	6	–	0	.400	7	–	8	–	3	.472
Louisville ‍‍‍	3	–	5	–	2	.400	4	–	9	–	5	.361
Duke ‍‍‍	2	–	5	–	3	.350	6	–	7	–	3	.469
NC State ‍‍‍	2	–	5	–	3	.350	3	–	9	–	6	.333
Miami (FL) ‍‍‍	2	–	7	–	1	.250	3	–	10	–	4	.294
Boston College ‍‍‍	0	–	6	–	4	.200	3	–	9	–	6	.333
Syracuse ‍‍‍	0	–	9	–	1	.050	2	–	14	–	2	.167
† – Conference champion ‡ – 2023 ACC Tournament champion y – Invited to the NCAA Tournament; Source: The ACC; As of December 5, 2023; Rankings from United Soccer Coaches Poll

The 2023 Boston College Eagles women's soccer team represented Boston College during the 2023 NCAA Division I women's soccer season. The Eagles were led by head coach Jason Lowe, in his fifth season. They played home games at Newton Campus Soccer Field. This was the team's 43rd season playing organized women's college soccer, and their 19th playing in the Atlantic Coast Conference.

The Eagles season started with a road trip to California where they went 0–1–1. They then returned home and lost to 15th ranked South Carolina by one goal, and only lost to Michigan by a goal as well. They picked up a few wins against non-power 5 opponents and finished the non-conference regular season 3–3–2. Their ACC slate featured four ranked teams in their first six games and the Eagles lost their first six matches. However, they tied all of their last four matches by a score of 1–1. This included a season finale draw with 3rd ranked North Carolina.

The Eagles finished the season 3–9–6 overall and 0–6–4 in ACC play to finish in thirteenth place. They did not qualify for the ACC Tournament and were not invited to the NCAA Tournament. Their three total wins was tied for lowest in program history with a shortened 2020 season. Their six draw were a program record, beating out the 5 draws in 2022.

== Previous season ==
The Eagles finished 5–8–5 overall and 1–7–2 in ACC play to finish in fourteenth place. They did not qualify for the ACC Tournament and were not invited to the NCAA Tournament.

== Offseason ==
=== Departures ===
Departures
Name	Number	Pos.	Height	Year	Hometown	Reason for departure
Jessica Carlton	3	MF	5'4"	Sophomore	Upland, California	Transferred to UC Santa Barbara
Éabha O'Mahony	6	DF	5'7"	Sophomore	Cork, Ireland	Transferred to Texas
Alycia Morin	7	FW	5'10"	Graduate Student	Montreal, Canada	Graduated
Sam Smith	9	FW	5'6"	Senior	Hanson, Massachusetts	Graduated, transferred to Texas A&M
Brooke Gierczak	11	DF	5'6"	Freshman	San Diego, California	—
Samantha Agresti	15	MF	5'7"	Senior	Swampscott, Massachusetts	Graduated
Kate Goggins	16	DF	5'4"	Sophomore	Orange County, California	—
Michela Agresti	23	DF	5'8"	Senior	Swampscott, Massachusetts	Graduated
Sydney Moore	27	DF	5'9"	Senior	Farmingdale, New York	Graduated
Emma Badger	29	DF	5'8"	Freshman	Wells, Maine	Transferred to Florida Gulf Coast

=== Incoming transfers ===
Incoming transfers
Name	Number	Pos.	Height	Year	Hometown	Previous school
15	Aislin Streicek	FW	5'10"	Junior	Vancouver, Canada	Alabama
27	Caroline Wallbridge	DF	5'9"	Sophomore	Hanover, Massachusetts	Maryland

=== Recruiting class ===
Name	Nationality	Hometown	Club	TDS Rating
Isabella Douglas; DF	(United States)	Montclair, New Jersey	Match Fit Academy FC	3/5 stars
Ava Feeley; FW	(United States)	Yarmouth, Maine	Seacoast United	3/5 stars
Maddie Landers; MF	(United States)	North Andover, Massachusetts	NEFC	3/5 stars
Mia Lochhead; DF	(United States)	Southborough, Massachusetts	NEFC	3/5 stars
Olivia Shippee; GK	(United States)	Central Valley, New York	Force FC	3/5 stars
Elly Slensky; MF	(United States)	Bala Cynwyd, Pennsylvania	FC Bucks	3/5 stars
Jada Tuffin; DF	(United States)	Pembroke Pines, Florida	Weston FC	2/5 stars
Casey Delaney Van pelt MF	(United States)	Houston, Texas	Albion Hurricanes FC	3/5 stars

== Squad ==
=== Roster ===
As of November 15, 2023

Note: Flags indicate national team as defined under FIFA eligibility rules; some limited exceptions apply. Players may hold more than one non-FIFA nationality.

No.	Pos.	Nation	Player
0	GK	USA	Olivia Shippee
1	GK	GER	Wiebke Willebrandt
2	GK	USA	Eva Nahas
4	DF	USA	Sarai Costello
5	MF	USA	Sonia Walk
6	DF	USA	Ava McNeil
7	DF	USA	Claire Mensi
8	MF	USA	Laura Gouvin
9	FW	USA	Sydney Segalla
10	MF	USA	Emily Sapienza
11	MF	GER	Hanna Schmelzle
12	MF	USA	Riley Kerber
13	FW	USA	Ava Feeley
14	DF	USA	Mia Lochhead

No.	Pos.	Nation	Player
15	FW	CAN	Aislin Streicek
16	MF	USA	Elly Slensky
17	DF	USA	Jada Tuffin
18	MF	USA	Reilly Johnson
20	DF	ISL	Ragna Magnúsdóttir
21	FW	USA	Andi Barth
22	FW	USA	Ella Richards
23	MF	USA	Maddie Landers
24	DF	USA	Jordan Teguis
25	MF	USA	Sophia Lowenberg
26	MF	USA	Bella Douglas
27	DF	USA	Caroline Walbridge
30	DF	USA	Kenna Thomas
31	MF	USA	Delaney Van Pelt

=== Team management ===
Position	Staff
Head coach	Jason Lowe
Assistant Coach	Dirk Vandeveer
Assistant Coach	Stephanie Demake
Assistant Coach	Paige Forster

== Schedule ==
Date Time, TV	Rank^{#}	Opponent^{#}	Result	Record	Site (Attendance) City, State
Exhibition
August 8*; 5:00 p.m.		Merrimack	Not Reported	—	Newton Campus Soccer Field; Chestnut Hill, MA
August 12*; 5:00 p.m.		Providence	Not Reported	—	Newton Campus Soccer Field; Chestnut Hill, MA
Non-conference regular season
August 17*; 10:00 p.m., ESPN+		at Cal State Fullerton	T 0–0	0–0–1	Titan Stadium (782); Fullerton, CA
August 20*; 4:00 p.m., ESPN+		at Long Beach State	L 2–4	0–1–1	George Allen Field (540); Long Beach, CA
August 24*; 7:00 p.m., ACCNX		No. 15 South Carolina	L 2–3	0–2–1	Newton Campus Soccer Field (552); Chestnut Hill, MA
August 27*; 12:00 p.m., ACCNX		San Jose State	W 2–0	1–2–1	Newton Campus Soccer Field (274); Chestnut Hill, MA
August 31*; 7:00 p.m., BTN+		at Michigan	L 0–1	1–3–1	U-M Soccer Stadium (648); Ann Arbor, MI
September 3*; 1:00 p.m., ESPN+		at Akron	W 2–0	2–3–1	FirstEnergy Stadium (395); Akron, OH
September 7*; 5:30 p.m., ACCNX		Dartmouth	T 1–1	2–3–2	Newton Campus Soccer Field (217); Chestnut Hill, MA
September 10*; 1:00 p.m., ACCNX		Sacred Heart	W 3–2	3–3–2	Newton Campus Soccer Field (223); Chestnut Hill, MA
ACC regular season
September 17; 1:00 p.m., ACCNX		No. 15 Duke	L 0–2	3–4–2 (0–1–0)	Newton Campus Soccer Field (627); Chestnut Hill, MA
September 21; 7:00 p.m., ACCNX		Virginia Tech	L 1–2	3–5–2 (0–2–0)	Newton Campus Soccer Field (333); Chestnut Hill, MA
September 24; 2:00 p.m., ACCN		No. 8 Clemson	L 0–2	3–6–2 (0–3–0)	Newton Campus Soccer Field (326); Chestnut Hill, MA
September 30; 7:00 p.m., ACCNX		at Pittsburgh	L 0–2	3–7–2 (0–4–0)	Ambrose Urbanic Field (858); Pittsburgh, PA
October 5; 7:00 p.m., ACCNX		at No. 11 Notre Dame	L 1–3	3–8–2 (0–5–0)	Alumni Stadium (307); Notre Dame, IN
October 8; 1:00 p.m., ACCNX		at No. 2 Florida State	L 0–6	3–9–2 (0–6–0)	Seminole Soccer Complex (1,444); Tallahassee, FL
October 14; 7:00 p.m., ACCNX		Louisville	T 1–1	3–9–3 (0–6–1)	Newton Campus Soccer Field (471); Chestnut Hill, MA
October 19; 6:00 p.m., ACCN		at Wake Forest	T 1–1	3–9–4 (0–6–2)	Spry Stadium (606); Winston-Salem, NC
October 22; 2:00 p.m., ACCNX		at Virginia	T 1–1	3–9–5 (0–6–3)	Klöckner Stadium (1,415); Charlottesville, VA
October 26; 7:00 p.m., ACCNX		No. 3 North Carolina	T 1–1	3–9–6 (0–6–4)	Newton Campus Soccer Field (1,268); Chestnut Hill, MA
*Non-conference game. ^{#}Rankings from United Soccer Coaches. (#) Tournament seedings in parentheses. All times are in Eastern.

== Rankings ==
Ranking movements Legend: — = Not ranked
	Week																
Poll	Pre	1	2	3	4	5	6	7	8	9	10	11	12	13	14	15	Final
United Soccer	—	—	—	—	—	—	—	—	—	—	—	—	Not released				—
TopDrawer Soccer	—	—	—	—	—	—	—	—	—	—	—	—	—	—	—	—	—
