= 2023 Clemson Tigers women's soccer team =

American college soccer season

2023 Clemson Tigers women's soccer

NCAA Tournament, Semifinals
- Conference: Atlantic Coast Conference
- U. Soc. Coaches poll: No. 3
- TopDrawerSoccer.com: No. 3
- Record: 18–4–4 (7–2–1 ACC)
- Head coach: Eddie Radwanski (13th season)
- Assistant coaches: Jeff Robbins (13th season); Siri Mullinix (13th season); Allison Wetherington (1st season)
- Home stadium: Riggs Field

2023 ACC women's soccer standings
	Conf.						Overall
Team	W		L		T	PCT	W		L		T	PCT
No. 1 Florida State ‍†‍‡‍^{y}	9	–	0	–	1	.950	22	–	0	–	1	.978
No. 16 Notre Dame ‍‍‍^{y}	7	–	1	–	2	.800	12	–	4	–	4	.700
No. 3 Clemson ‍‍‍^{y}	7	–	2	–	1	.750	18	–	4	–	4	.769
No. 8 North Carolina ‍‍‍^{y}	5	–	0	–	5	.750	13	–	2	–	8	.739
No. 6 Pittsburgh ‍‍‍^{y}	6	–	3	–	1	.650	17	–	6	–	1	.729
Wake Forest ‍‍‍	4	–	2	–	4	.600	10	–	3	–	5	.694
Virginia ‍‍‍	3	–	3	–	4	.500	8	–	3	–	6	.647
Virginia Tech ‍‍‍	4	–	6	–	0	.400	7	–	8	–	3	.472
Louisville ‍‍‍	3	–	5	–	2	.400	4	–	9	–	5	.361
Duke ‍‍‍	2	–	5	–	3	.350	6	–	7	–	3	.469
NC State ‍‍‍	2	–	5	–	3	.350	3	–	9	–	6	.333
Miami (FL) ‍‍‍	2	–	7	–	1	.250	3	–	10	–	4	.294
Boston College ‍‍‍	0	–	6	–	4	.200	3	–	9	–	6	.333
Syracuse ‍‍‍	0	–	9	–	1	.050	2	–	14	–	2	.167
† – Conference champion ‡ – 2023 ACC Tournament champion y – Invited to the NCAA Tournament; Source: The ACC; As of December 5, 2023; Rankings from United Soccer Coaches Poll

The 2023 Clemson Tigers women's soccer team represented Clemson University during the 2023 NCAA Division I women's soccer season. The Tigers were led by head coach Ed Radwanski, in his thirteenth season. The Tigers home games were played at Riggs Field. This was the team's 30th season playing organized soccer, and all of those seasons were played in the Atlantic Coast Conference.

The Tigers started the season well, with a tie of twelfth-ranked rival South Carolina. They wouldn't allow a goal until August 31 and won their next six non-conference games. Those games included two wins over Power 5 opponents and one against seventh-ranked Arkansas. They would finish their non-conference schedule with a draw against Georgia. ACC play began with a loss against fourth-ranked Florida State. However, the Tigers won their next three games before drawing against Virginia. After the draw, the Tigers rattled off four straight conference wins including wins over ranked Duke and Pittsburgh. They finished the ACC season with a loss to eleventh ranked Notre Dame.

The Tigers finished the season 7–2–1 in ACC play to finish in third place. As the third seed in the ACC Tournament they defeated Wake Forest in the First Round. In the Second Round, they avenged a regular season loss to Notre Dame, by defeating them 3–2. They faced off against Florida State in the final, but could not avenge a regular season loss, as they lost 2–1. They received an at-large invitation to the NCAA Tournament where they were a one-seed in the Clemson Bracket and earned home field advantage until the College Cup. The defeated Radford in the First Round, Columbia in the Second Round, and faced off against Georgia again in the Round of 16. Just as in the regular season, the game ended 1–1 and went to penalties. Clemson advanced 5–3 and faced second-seed Penn State. The Tigers won 2–1 and advanced to their first College Cup in program history. In the College Cup, Clemson faced Florida State for the third time this season, and lost again 2–0, to end their season. Their final record was 18–4–4.

Halle Mackiewicz was named ACC Goalkeeper of the Year and set a school record with thirteen shut-outs at the time of the award. Mackiewicz would add one more during the NCAA Tournament to bring her total to fourteen for the season. Clemson also played three players on the All-ACC First Team, three on the Third Team, and three on the All-Freshman team. Their seven conference wins were the most since 2016 and were the highest total in program history, tied with 2016 and 2015. They finished as runners up in the ACC Tournament for the fourth time in program history, and first time since 2002. Their eighteen wins were the second best in program history, second only to the 19 wins in 2000. Their NCAA tournament qualification extended their streak of consecutive qualifications to ten.

== Previous season ==
The Tigers finished the season 8–5–5 overall and 4–3–3 in ACC play to finish in seventh place. They did not qualify for the ACC Tournament, finishing one spot outside of the six teams that qualified. They received an at-large invitation to the NCAA Tournament where they were a five-seed in the UCLA Bracket and hosted Vanderbilt in the First Round. They lost the game 0–1 to end their season. Their eight wins was their lowest total since 2013.

== Offseason ==
=== Departures ===
Departures
Name	Number	Pos.	Height	Year	Hometown	Reason for departure
Devi Dudley	6	MF	5'3"	Senior	American Fork, Utah	Graduated
Caitlin Smith	8	DF	5'10"	Sophomore	New Forest, England	—
Cassidy Lindley	11	FW	5'7"	Senior	Carmel, Indiana	Graduated
Fran Stables	14	MF	5'6"	Sophomore	Manchester, England	Transferred to Cincinnati
Kacey Smekrud	19	FW	5'11"	Senior	La Grange, Kentucky	Graduated
Courtney Jones	20	FW	5'2"	Senior	Carmel, Indiana	Graduated
Maliah Morris	21	FW	5'3"	Senior	Germantown, Maryland	Graduated
Kate Borner	27	DF	5'6"	Freshman	Cumming, Georgia	—

=== Recruiting class ===
Name	Nationality	Hometown	Club	TDS Rating
Danielle Davis; MF	(United States)	Port Washington, New York	SUSA FC Academy	4/5 stars
Eleanor Hays; DF	(United States)	Lewisville, Texas	FC Dallas	3/5 stars
Danielle Lynch; DF	(United States)	Los Angeles, California	LAFC So Cal	3/5 stars
Tatum Short; FW	(United States)	Las Vegas, Nevada	Heat FC	4/5 stars
Jenna Tobia; FW	(United States)	Warren, New Jersey	PDA (ECNL - Blue)	4/5 stars

== Squad ==
=== Roster ===
As of December 4, 2023

Note: Flags indicate national team as defined under FIFA eligibility rules; some limited exceptions apply. Players may hold more than one non-FIFA nationality.

No.	Pos.	Nation	Player
1	GK	USA	Halle Mackiewicz
2	DF	USA	Makenna Morris
3	DF	USA	Layne St. George
4	DF	USA	Harper White
5	MF	ENG	Emily Brough
6	DF	USA	Eleanor Hays
7	MF	USA	Dani Davis
8	FW	USA	Jenna Tobia
9	DF	USA	Mackenzie Duff
10	FW	USA	Renee Lyles
11	FW	USA	Tatum Short
12	FW	USA	Sydney Minarik
13	FW	USA	Emma Wennar

No.	Pos.	Nation	Player
15	MF	USA	Hal Hershfelt
16	MF	USA	Ella Hauser
17	MF	USA	Emma Lerner
18	FW	USA	Maria Manousos
22	MF	USA	Gabby Gambino
23	FW	USA	Caroline Conti
24	DF	USA	Megan Bornkamp
25	DF	USA	Dani Lynch
26	GK	USA	Addy Holgorsen
27	MF	USA	Erin Sherden
29	FW	USA	Sami Meredith
34	GK	USA	Ally Lynch

== Team management ==
Position	Staff
Athletic Director	(United States) Graham Neff
Head coach	(United States) Eddie Radwanski
Associate head coach	(United States) Jeff Robbins
Assistant coach	(United States) Siri Mullinix
Assistant Coach	(United States) Allison Wetherington

== Schedule ==
Date Time, TV	Rank^{#}	Opponent^{#}	Result	Record	Site City, State
Exhibition
August 9*; 5:00 p.m.	No. 25	vs. Ole Miss	None reported	–	Atlanta United Training Ground; Atlanta, GA
August 12*; 7:30 p.m.	No. 25	at UNC Wilmington	W 4–1	–	UNCW Soccer Stadium; Wilmington, NC
Non-conference regular season
August 17*; 7:00 p.m., ACCNX	No. 25	No. 12 South Carolina; Rivalry	T 0–0	0–0–1	Riggs Field (3,917); Clemson, SC
August 20*; 6:00 p.m., ACCNX	No. 25	Gardner-Webb	W 9–0	1–0–1	Riggs Field (634); Clemson, SC
August 24*; 9:30 p.m., ESPN+	No. 19	at Utah Valley	W 2–0	2–0–1	Wolverine Stadium (2,678); Orem, UT
August 27*; 2:00 p.m., P12N	No. 19	at Utah	W 1–0	3–0–1	Ute Soccer Field (918); Salt Lake City, UT
August 31*; 7:00 p.m., ACCNX	No. 11	Furman	W 4–1	4–0–1	Riggs Field (503); Clemson, SC
September 3*; 6:00 p.m., ACCNX	No. 11	Western Carolina	W 5–0	5–0–1	Riggs Field (652); Clemson, SC
September 7*; 7:00 p.m., ACCNX	No. 9	No. 7 Arkansas	W 1–0	6–0–1	Riggs Field (507); Clemson, SC
September 10*; 6:00 p.m., SECN	No. 9	at Georgia	T 1–1	6–0–2	Turner Soccer Complex (1,368); Athens, GA
ACC regular season
September 15; 4:00 p.m., ACCNX	No. 8	No. 4 Florida State	L 2–4	6–1–2 (0–1–0)	Riggs Field (1,102); Clemson, SC
September 21; 6:00 p.m., ACCN	No. 8	at Miami (FL)	W 5–0	7–1–2 (1–1–0)	Cobb Stadium (184); Coral Gables, FL
September 24; 2:00 p.m., ACCN	No. 8	at Boston College	W 2–0	8–1–2 (2–1–0)	Newton Campus Soccer Field (326); Chestnut Hill, MA
September 30; 7:00 p.m., ACCNX	No. 8	Syracuse	W 5–1	9–1–2 (3–1–0)	Riggs Field (932); Clemson, SC
October 5; 7:00 p.m., ACCNX	No. 9	Virginia	T 1–1	9–1–3 (3–1–1)	Riggs Field (583); Clemson, SC
October 8; 3:00 p.m., ACCNX	No. 9	at Virginia Tech	W 1–0	10–1–3 (4–1–1)	Thompson Field (297); Blacksburg, VA
October 13; 5:00 p.m., ACCNX	No. 7	at No. 23 Duke	W 1–0	11–1–3 (5–1–1)	Koskinen Stadium (1,457); Durham, NC
October 19; 7:00 p.m., ACCNX	No. 8	Louisville	W 3–0	12–1–3 (6–1–1)	Riggs Field (362); Clemson, SC
October 22; 2:00 p.m., ACCN	No. 8	No. 18 Pittsburgh	W 1–0	13–1–3 (7–1–1)	Riggs Field (867); Clemson, SC
October 26; 8:00 p.m., ACCN	No. 8	at No. 11 Notre Dame	L 0–2	13–2–3 (7–2–1)	Alumni Stadium (496); Notre Dame, IN
ACC tournament
October 29; 5:30 p.m., ACCN	(3) No. 8	(6) Wake Forest; First Round	W 1–0	14–2–3	Riggs Field (795); Clemson, SC
November 2; 6:00 p.m., ACCN	(3) No. 7	(2) No. 9 Notre Dame; Semifinals	W 3–2	15–2–3	WakeMed Soccer Park (678); Cary, NC
November 5; 12:00 p.m., ESPNU	(3) No. 7	(1) No. 1 Florida State; Final	L 1–2	15–3–3	WakeMed Soccer Park (1); Cary, NC
NCAA tournament
November 10; 7:00 p.m., ESPN+	(1) No. 7	Radford; First Round	W 2–0	16–3–3	Riggs Field (1,775); Clemson, SC
November 17; 5:30 p.m., ESPN+	(1) No. 7	(8) Columbia; Second Round	W 2–1	17–3–3	Riggs Field (1,785); Clemson, SC
November 19; 2:00 p.m., ESPN+	(1) No. 7	(4) Georgia; Round of 16	T 1–1 (5–3 PKs) ^{2OT}	17–3–4	Riggs Field (1,471); Clemson, SC
November 25; 1:00 p.m., ESPN+	(1) No. 7	(2) No. 5 Penn State; Quarterfinals	W 2–1	18–3–4	Riggs Field (1,472); Clemson, SC
December 1; 6:00 p.m., ESPNU	(1) No. 7	(1) No. 1 Florida State; Semifinals	L 0–2	18–4–4	WakeMed Soccer Park (10,635); Cary, NC
*Non-conference game. ^{#}Rankings from United Soccer Coaches. (#) Tournament seedings in parentheses. All times are in Eastern.

== Goals Record ==
Rank	No.	Nat.	Po.	Name	Regular season	ACC Tournament	NCAA Tournament	Total
1	2	USA	DF	Makenna Morris	8	0	2	10
2	23	USA	FW	Caroline Conti	5	1	2	8
3	9	USA	DF	Mackenzie Duff	4	2	0	6
3	10	USA	MF	Renee Lyles	5	0	1	6
3	29	USA	FW	Sami Meredith	6	0	0	6
6	24	USA	DF	Megan Bornkamp	2	1	2	5
7	8	USA	FW	Jenna Tobia	4	0	0	4
8	11	USA	FW	Tatum Short	2	1	0	3
8	13	USA	FW	Emma Wennar	3	0	0	3
10	18	USA	FW	Maria Manousos	2	0	0	2
11	5	ENG	MF	Emily Brough	1	0	0	1
11	7	USA	MF	Danni Davis	1	0	0	1
11	15	USA	MF	Hal Hershfelt	1	0	0	1
Total					44	5	7	56

== Disciplinary record ==
Rank	No.	Nat.	Po.	Name	Regular Season			ACC Tournament			NCAA Tournament			Total		
Rank	No.	Nat.	Po.	Name	Booked	(yellow card) (yellow-red card)	Sent off (straight red)	Booked	(yellow card) (yellow-red card)	Sent off (straight red)	Booked	(yellow card) (yellow-red card)	Sent off (straight red)	Booked	(yellow card) (yellow-red card)	Sent off (straight red)
1	15	(United States)	MF	Hal Hershfelt	4	0	0	1	0	0	1	0	0	6	0	0
2	8	(United States)	MF	Jenna Tobia	3	0	0	1	0	0	0	0	0	4	0	0
3	7	(United States)	MF	Dani Davis	1	0	0	0	0	0	1	0	0	2	0	0
3	9	(United States)	DF	Mackenzie Duff	2	0	0	0	0	0	0	0	0	2	0	0
3	24	(United States)	DF	Megan Bornkamp	1	0	0	1	0	0	0	0	0	2	0	0
5	3	(United States)	DF	Layne St. George	1	0	0	0	0	0	0	0	0	1	0	0
5	4	(United States)	DF	Harper White	1	0	0	0	0	0	0	0	0	1	0	0
5	23	(United States)	MF	Caroline Conti	0	0	0	1	0	0	0	0	0	1	0	0
Team					0	0	0	2	0	0	0	0	0	2	0	0
Total					12	0	0	6	0	0	2	0	0	20	0	0

== Awards and honors ==
Recipient	Award	Date	Ref.
Megan Bornkamp	Preseason All-ACC Team	August 10	
Hal Hershfelt	Preseason All-ACC Team	August 10	
Megan Bornkamp	Hermann Trophy Preseason Watchlist	August 17	
Halle Mackiewicz	ACC Defensive Player of the Week	September 12	
Mackenzie Duff	ACC Defensive Player of the Week	September 26	
Makenna Morris	ACC Defensive Player of the Week	October 17	
Makenna Morris	ACC Defensive Player of the Week	October 24	
Renee Lyles	ACC Co-Offensive Player of the Week	October 24	
Halle Mackiewicz	ACC Goalkeeper of the Year	November 1	
Hal Hershfelt	All-ACC First Team	November 1	
Halle Mackiewicz	All-ACC First Team	November 1	
Makenna Morris	All-ACC First Team	November 1	
Megan Bornkamp	All-ACC Third Team	November 1	
Caroline Conti	All-ACC Third Team	November 1	
Harper White	All-ACC Third Team	November 1	
Dani Davis	All-ACC Freshman Team	November 1	
Tatum Short	All-ACC Freshman Team	November 1	
Jenna Tobia	All-ACC Freshman Team	November 1	
Halle Mackiewicz	All-ACC Tournament Team	November 5	
Dani Davis	All-ACC Tournament Team	November 5	
Mackenzie Duff	All-ACC Tournament Team	November 5	
Halle Mackiewicz	United Soccer Coaches All-America Second Team	December 1	
Makenna Morris	United Soccer Coaches All-America Second Team	December 1	

== Rankings ==
Ranking movements Legend: ██ Increase in ranking ██ Decrease in ranking — = Not ranked
	Week																
Poll	Pre	1	2	3	4	5	6	7	8	9	10	11	12	13	14	15	Final
United Soccer	25	19	11	9	8	8	8	9	7	8	8	7	Not released				3
TopDrawer Soccer	—	—	—	—	14	16	9	8	12	10	6	9	5	4	3	3	3

== 2024 NWSL Draft ==
Clemson had four players taken in the 2024 NWSL draft, including the fifth overall pick.

Player	Team	Round	Pick #	Position
(United States) Hal Hershfelt	Washington Spirit	1	5	MF
(United States) Makenna Morris	Washington Spirit	1	13	DF
(United States) Halle Mackiewicz	Kansas City Current	3	32	GK
(United States) Caroline Conti	Bay FC	3	34	MF
