= 2023 Notre Dame Fighting Irish women's soccer team =

American college soccer season

2023 Notre Dame Fighting Irish women's soccer

NCAA Tournament, Second Round
- Conference: Atlantic Coast Conference
- U. Soc. Coaches poll: No. 16
- TopDrawerSoccer.com: No. 17
- Record: 12–4–4 (7–1–2 ACC)
- Head coach: Nate Norman (6th season)
- Assistant coaches: Dawn Siergiej (21st season); Martin Rennie (1st season)
- Home stadium: Alumni Stadium

2023 ACC women's soccer standings
	Conf.						Overall
Team	W		L		T	PCT	W		L		T	PCT
No. 1 Florida State ‍†‍‡‍^{y}	9	–	0	–	1	.950	22	–	0	–	1	.978
No. 16 Notre Dame ‍‍‍^{y}	7	–	1	–	2	.800	12	–	4	–	4	.700
No. 3 Clemson ‍‍‍^{y}	7	–	2	–	1	.750	18	–	4	–	4	.769
No. 8 North Carolina ‍‍‍^{y}	5	–	0	–	5	.750	13	–	2	–	8	.739
No. 6 Pittsburgh ‍‍‍^{y}	6	–	3	–	1	.650	17	–	6	–	1	.729
Wake Forest ‍‍‍	4	–	2	–	4	.600	10	–	3	–	5	.694
Virginia ‍‍‍	3	–	3	–	4	.500	8	–	3	–	6	.647
Virginia Tech ‍‍‍	4	–	6	–	0	.400	7	–	8	–	3	.472
Louisville ‍‍‍	3	–	5	–	2	.400	4	–	9	–	5	.361
Duke ‍‍‍	2	–	5	–	3	.350	6	–	7	–	3	.469
NC State ‍‍‍	2	–	5	–	3	.350	3	–	9	–	6	.333
Miami (FL) ‍‍‍	2	–	7	–	1	.250	3	–	10	–	4	.294
Boston College ‍‍‍	0	–	6	–	4	.200	3	–	9	–	6	.333
Syracuse ‍‍‍	0	–	9	–	1	.050	2	–	14	–	2	.167
† – Conference champion ‡ – 2023 ACC Tournament champion y – Invited to the NCAA Tournament; Source: The ACC; As of December 5, 2023; Rankings from United Soccer Coaches Poll

The 2023 Notre Dame Fighting Irish women's soccer team represented the University of Notre Dame during the 2023 NCAA Division I women's soccer season. It was the 36th season of the university fielding a program. The Fighting Irish were led by sixth year head coach, Nate Norman, and played their games at Alumni Stadium.

The Fighting Irish started off the season as the 3rd ranked team in the United Soccer Coaches Poll but drew their opening match of the year 2–2 with Milwaukee. This dropped them to number 12 in the rankings. They won their next two games, but then lost to number 10 Arkansas. They lost at home to Michigan as well and ended their non-conference schedule 4–1–2 and ranked at number 13. They started the ACC season well with two wins, including one at number 16 Duke. They followed that with a draw away to Pittsburgh. They won their next three games before losing to number 1 Florida State. This was followed with a draw to number 3 North Carolina. They finished the season with two wins, including a season finale victory against number 8 Clemson.

The Fighting Irish finished 12–4–4 overall and 7–1–2 in ACC play to finish in second place. As the second seed in the ACC Tournament, they lost to Clemson, who avenged their final regular season game defeat. They received an at-large bid to the NCAA Tournament, where they were the third-seed in the Florida State Bracket. They defeated Valparaiso in the First Round, before falling to Memphis in the Second Round. Memphis was the sixth seed in the bracket, but was ranked number 8 at the time and Notre Dame was ranked number 9. Their ACC Tournament appearance extended their streak of qualification to five straight years, and this was the third straight NCAA Tournament for the Fighting Irish.

== Previous season ==
The Fighting Irish finished 17–3–3 overall and 7–2–1 in ACC play to finish in third place. As the third seed in the ACC Tournament, they tied with Pittsburgh in the First around and advanced via penalty shoot-out 5–4. In the Semifinal, Notre Dame played Florida State to a draw, but lost the penalty shoot-out to the eventual champions. They received an at-large bid to the NCAA Tournament, where they were the first-seed in the Notre Dame Bracket. They defeated Omaha in the First Round, eight-seed Santa Clara in the Second Round, and five-seed TCU in the Round of 16. However, they fell 2–0 to ACC foe North Carolina in the Quarterfinals to end their season. Their Quarterfinal performance was their best finish since 2010, when they won the NCAA title.

== Offseason ==
=== Departures ===
Departures
Name	Number	Pos.	Height	Year	Hometown	Reason for departure
Mackenzie Wood	1	GK	5'9"	Graduate Student	Granger, Indiana	Graduated
Korbin Albert	2	MF	5'7"	Sophomore	Grayslake, Illinois	Signed Professional contract with Paris Saint-Germain
Anna Rico	6	FW	5'5"	Graduate Student	Bainbridge, Ohio	Graduated
Olivia Wingate	9	FW	5'7"	Graduate Student	Wilmington, Massachusetts	Graduated; drafted 6th overall in 2023 NWSL Draft
Aba Dunbar	14	DF	5'8"	Sophomore	Coronado, California	Transferred to San Diego
Kati Druzina	15	FW	5'6"	Senior	Kirtland, Ohio	Graduated
Brianna Martinez	16	MF	5'6"	Graduate Student	Albuquerque, New Mexico	Graduated; drafted 17th overall in 2023 NWSL Draft
Maddie Mooney	20	DF	5'8"	Sophomore	Seattle, Washington	Transferred to TCU
Ashley Zugay	21	DF	5'7"	Graduate Student	Ann Arbor, Michigan	Graduated
Katie Coyle	22	MF	5'7"	Sophomore	Middletown, New Jersey	Transferred to Maryland
Aly Akers	23	MF	5'8"	Sophomore	Bellevue, Washington	Transferred to Georgia
Julia Ware	26	DF	5'8"	Graduate Student	Frisco, Texas	Graduated
Sophia Prudholme	29	MF	5'6"	Sophomore	Malibu, California	Transferred to Pepperdine

=== Recruiting class ===
Name	Nationality	Hometown	Club	TDS Rating
Paige Buchner; FW	(United States)	Santee, California	San Diego Surf	3/5 stars
Charlie Codd; FW	(United States)	Waco, Texas	Solar Soccer Club	4/5 stars
Jackie Hollomon; GK	(United States)	Seattle, Washington	OL Reign Academy	3/5 stars
Isabella Leonard; MF	(United States)	Phoenix, Arizona	Utah Royals FC (AZ)	4/5 stars
Clare Logan; DF	(Canada)	Vancouver, Canada	Vancouver Whitecaps	3/5 stars
Meghan Mrowicki; FW	(United States)	Arlington Heights, Illinois	Eclipse Select (IL)	4/5 stars
Atlee Olofson; GK	(United States)	Austin, Texas	Austin Sting	4/5 stars
Morgan Roy; MF	(United States)	Commerce, Michigan	Nationals (GA)	4/5 stars
Tatiana Tagne; DF	(Canada)	Markham, Canada	Women's EXCEL Program	N/A
Chayse Ying; MF	(Philippines)	Los Angeles, California	Tudela FC	3/5 stars

== Squad ==
=== Roster ===
As of November 29, 2023

Note: Flags indicate national team as defined under FIFA eligibility rules; some limited exceptions apply. Players may hold more than one non-FIFA nationality.

No.	Pos.	Nation	Player
0	GK	USA	Jackie Hollomon
1	GK	USA	Atlee Olofson
2	DF	CAN	Clare Logan
3	MF	USA	Maddie Mercado
4	DF	USA	Leah Klenke
5	FW	USA	Ellie Ospeck
6	FW	USA	Paige Buchner
7	FW	JAM	Kiki Van Zanten
8	DF	USA	KJ Ronan
9	FW	USA	Charlie Codd
10	MF	USA	Erin Hohnstein
11	MF	USA	Sophia Fisher
12	MF	USA	Kiki Turner
13	MF	USA	Laney Matriano
15	MF	USA	Morgan Ray

No.	Pos.	Nation	Player
16	FW	USA	Meg Mrowicki
17	FW	USA	Audrey Weiss
18	MF	USA	Berkley Mensik
19	MF	USA	Eva Gaetino
21	MF	PHI	Chayse Ying
22	DF	CAN	Tatiana Tagne
23	MF	USA	Bella Leonard
24	FW	USA	Paige Peltier
25	DF	USA	Waniya Hudson
27	DF	USA	Caroline Gray
28	DF	USA	Eva Wirtz
31	GK	USA	Ashley Naylor
33	GK	USA	Kaylin Slattery
34	FW	USA	Kristina Lynch

== Team management ==
Position	Staff
Head coach	Nate Norman
Assistant Coach	Dawn Siergiej
Assistant Coach	Martin Rennie
Operations Specialist	Emily Voltz

== Schedule ==
Date Time, TV	Rank^{#}	Opponent^{#}	Result	Record	Site City, State
Exhibition
August 8*; 12:00 p.m.	No. 3	vs. No. 5 Virginia	W 3–1	–	Grand Traverse Bay YMCA; Traverse City, MI
August 12*	No. 3	Valparaiso	W 5–0	–	Alumni Stadium; Notre Dame, IN
Non-conference regular season
August 17*; 7:00 p.m., ACCNX	No. 3	Milwaukee	T 2–2	0–0–1	Alumni Stadium (543); Notre Dame, IN
August 20*; 12:00 p.m., ACCNX	No. 3	Ball State	W 3–0	1–0–1	Alumni Stadium (858); Notre Dame, IN
August 24*; 5:00 p.m., ACCNX	No. 12	Butler	W 4–1	2–0–1	Alumni Stadium (221); Notre Dame, IN
August 27*; 2:00 p.m., ACCN	No. 12	No. 10 Arkansas	T 2–2	2–0–2	Alumni Stadium (650); Notre Dame, IN
September 3*; 1:00 p.m., BTN+	No. 15	at Michigan State	W 2–1	3–0–2	DeMartin Soccer Complex (2,084); East Lansing, MI
September 7*; 7:00 p.m., ACCNX	No. 11	Michigan	L 0–1	3–1–2	Alumni Stadium (744); Notre Dame, IN
September 10*; 1:00 p.m., ESPN+	No. 11	at Bowling Green	W 3–0	4–1–2	Mickey Cochrane Stadium (1,516); Bowling Green, OH
ACC regular season
September 15; 7:00 p.m., ACCNX	No. 13	Wake Forest	W 3–1	5–1–2 (1–0–0)	Alumni Stadium (1,372); Notre Dame, IN
September 21; 7:00 p.m., ACCNX	No. 10	at No. 16 Duke	W 2–1	6–1–2 (2–0–0)	Koskinen Stadium (803); Durham, NC
September 24; 1:00 p.m., ACCNX	No. 10	at Pittsburgh	T 1–1	6–1–3 (2–0–1)	Ambrose Urbanic Field (973); Pittsburgh, PA
September 30; 7:00 p.m., ACCNX	No. 10	Louisville	W 3–0	7–1–3 (3–0–1)	Alumni Stadium (450); Notre Dame, IN
October 5; 7:00 p.m., ACCNX	No. 11	Boston College	W 3–1	8–1–3 (4–0–1)	Alumni Stadium (307); Notre Dame, IN
October 8; 1:00 p.m., ACCNX	No. 11	Miami (FL)	W 7–2	9–1–3 (5–0–1)	Alumni Stadium (407); Notre Dame, IN
October 12; 7:00 p.m., ACCN	No. 11	at No. 1 Florida State	L 1–4	9–2–3 (5–1–1)	Seminole Soccer Complex (1,693); Tallahassee, FL
October 19; 8:00 p.m., ACCN	No. 12	at No. 3 North Carolina	T 1–1	9–2–4 (5–1–2)	Dorrance Field (2,378); Chapel Hill, NC
October 22; 1:00 p.m., ACCNX	No. 12	at NC State	W 1–0	10–2–4 (6–1–2)	Dail Soccer Field (464); Raleigh, NC
October 26; 8:00 p.m., ACCN	No. 11	No. 8 Clemson	W 2–0	11–2–4 (7–1–2)	Alumni Stadium (496); Notre Dame, IN
ACC tournament
November 2; 5:30 p.m., ACCN	(2) No. 9	(3) No. 7 Clemson; Semifinals	L 2–3	11–3–4	WakeMed Soccer Park (678); Cary, North Carolina
NCAA tournament
November 11; 6:00 p.m., ESPN+	(3) No. 9	Valparaiso; First Round	W 2–0	12–3–4	Alumni Stadium (840); Notre Dame, IN
November 17; 4:00 p.m., ESPN+	(3) No. 9	(6) No. 8 Memphis; Second Round	L 2–3	12–4–4	Razorback Field (2,215); Fayetteville, AR
*Non-conference game. ^{#}Rankings from United Soccer Coaches. (#) Tournament seedings in parentheses. All times are in Eastern.

== Awards and honors ==
Recipient	Award	Date	Ref.
Eva Gaetino	Pre-season All-ACC Team	August 11	
Eva Gaetino	Hermann Trophy Preseason Watchlist	August 17	
Kiki Van Zanten	ACC Offensive Player of the Week	October 3	
Ellie Ospeck	ACC Offensive Player of the Week	October 10	
Eva Gaetino	ACC Defensive Player of the Year	November 1	
Kiki Van Zanten	All-ACC First Team	November 1	
Eva Gaetino	All-ACC First Team	November 1	
Leah Klenke	All-ACC Second Team	November 1	
Maddie Mercado	All-ACC Second Team	November 1	
Charlie Codd	All-ACC Freshman Team	November 1	
Morgan Roy	All-ACC Freshman Team	November 1	
Maddie Mercado	All-ACC Tournament Team	November 5	
Eva Gaetino	United Soccer Coaches All-America First Team	December 1	

== Rankings ==
Ranking movements Legend: ██ Increase in ranking ██ Decrease in ranking
	Week																
Poll	Pre	1	2	3	4	5	6	7	8	9	10	11	12	13	14	15	Final
United Soccer	3	12	15	11	13	10	10	11	11	12	11	9	Not released				16
TopDrawer Soccer	7	10	11	8	16	12	11	11	10	12	9	6	7	6	17	17	17

== 2024 NWSL Draft ==
Player	Team	Round	Pick #	Position
(Jamaica) Kiki Van Zanten	Houston Dash	2	21	FW
(United States) Maddie Mercado	Seattle Reign FC	2	27	FW
