= 2023 NC State Wolfpack women's soccer team =

American college soccer season

2023 NC State Wolfpack women's soccer
- Conference: Atlantic Coast Conference
- Record: 3–9–6 (2–5–3 ACC)
- Head coach: Tim Santoro (12th season)
- Assistant coaches: Sebastian Vecchio (1st season); Maddy Haro (1st season)
- Home stadium: Dail Soccer Field

2023 ACC women's soccer standings
	Conf.						Overall
Team	W		L		T	PCT	W		L		T	PCT
No. 1 Florida State ‍†‍‡‍^{y}	9	–	0	–	1	.950	22	–	0	–	1	.978
No. 16 Notre Dame ‍‍‍^{y}	7	–	1	–	2	.800	12	–	4	–	4	.700
No. 3 Clemson ‍‍‍^{y}	7	–	2	–	1	.750	18	–	4	–	4	.769
No. 8 North Carolina ‍‍‍^{y}	5	–	0	–	5	.750	13	–	2	–	8	.739
No. 6 Pittsburgh ‍‍‍^{y}	6	–	3	–	1	.650	17	–	6	–	1	.729
Wake Forest ‍‍‍	4	–	2	–	4	.600	10	–	3	–	5	.694
Virginia ‍‍‍	3	–	3	–	4	.500	8	–	3	–	6	.647
Virginia Tech ‍‍‍	4	–	6	–	0	.400	7	–	8	–	3	.472
Louisville ‍‍‍	3	–	5	–	2	.400	4	–	9	–	5	.361
Duke ‍‍‍	2	–	5	–	3	.350	6	–	7	–	3	.469
NC State ‍‍‍	2	–	5	–	3	.350	3	–	9	–	6	.333
Miami (FL) ‍‍‍	2	–	7	–	1	.250	3	–	10	–	4	.294
Boston College ‍‍‍	0	–	6	–	4	.200	3	–	9	–	6	.333
Syracuse ‍‍‍	0	–	9	–	1	.050	2	–	14	–	2	.167
† – Conference champion ‡ – 2023 ACC Tournament champion y – Invited to the NCAA Tournament; Source: The ACC; As of December 5, 2023; Rankings from United Soccer Coaches Poll

The 2023 NC State Wolfpack women's soccer team represented NC State University during the 2023 NCAA Division I women's soccer season. The Wolfpack were led by head coach Tim Santoro, in his twelfth season. They played their home games at Dail Soccer Field. This was the team's 40th season playing organized women's college soccer and their 37th playing in the Atlantic Coast Conference.

The Wolfpack had a difficult non-conference slate, with 50% of their non-conference games being against Power 5 opposition. The difficulty of the slate was reflected in their record, as they came away from their eight non-conference games with only one win. Their ACC season did not start much better, as their lost their first game before tying the next two. This was followed by two losses. Their fortunes turned around as they won two of their next three before losing their final two games. They finished 3–9–6 overall and 2–5–3 in ACC play to finish in a tie for tenth place place. They did not qualify for the ACC Tournament and were not invited to the NCAA Tournament.

The Wolfpack's three wins were the second lowest in program history, with only 2014 having fewer wins. 2023 was the second straight year where the Wolfpack only finished with two conference wins. This season broke a streak of two straight NCAA tournament invites.

== Previous season ==
The Wolfpack finished 7–7–6 overall and 2–6–2 in ACC play to finish in eleventh place. They did not qualify for the ACC Tournament. Their seven overall wins were their worst since 2015, excluding a shortened 2020. They received an at-large bid to the NCAA Tournament. As the eighth-seed in the UCLA Bracket they hosted UCF who was ranked #20 in the polls at the time. The match ended in a 1–1 draw, but the Wolfpack lost the ensuing penalty shootout 4–2 to end their season.

== Offseason ==
=== Departures ===
Departures
Name	Number	Pos.	Height	Year	Hometown	Reason for departure
Eden Millan	0	GK	5'6"	Senior	Redondo Beach, California	Graduated
Grace Spriggs	1	GK	5'5"	Sophomore	Prairieville, Louisiana	—
Nina Zimmer	2	DF	5'6"	Sophomore	Dortmund, Germany	—
Jenna Butler	5	DF	5'10"	Graduate Student	Gainesville, Virginia	Graduated
Lulu Guttenberger	6	DF	5'5"	Graduate Student	Velburg, Germany	Graduated
Delaney Engel	21	MF	5'8"	Freshman	Glen Ellyn, Illinois	Transferred to UIC
Samantha Castro	24	MF	5'1"	Sophomore	Culver City, California	—
Nadia Stupec	26	GK	5'7"	Sophomore	Chantilly, Virginia	—
Kayla Siddiqi	28	DF	5'9"	Sophomore	Midlothian, Virginia	Transferred to Florida Atlantic

=== Incoming transfers ===
Incoming transfers
Name	Number	Pos.	Height	Year	Hometown	Previous school
Olivia Pratapas	1	GK	5'9"	Junior	Clemmons, North Carolina	Louisville

=== Recruiting class ===
Name	Nationality	Hometown	Club	TDS Rating
Jade Bordeleau; FW	(Canada)	Terrabonne, Canada	Quebec REX	N/A
Emily Earles; GK	(United States)	Raleigh, North Carolina	North Carolina Courage	3/5 stars
Sophia Hernandez; MF	(United States)	Greensboro, North Carolina	NC Fusion	3/5 stars
Hannah Jibril; FW	(United States)	Glyndon, Maryland	Pipeline SC (MD)	4/5 stars
Rosalie Olou; MF	(Canada)	Blainville, Canada	Quebec REX	N/A
Mackenzie Smith; DF	(England)	Leicester, England	Leicester City	N/A
Aisley Snell; GK	(United States)	Brunswick, Maine	Darlington School Soccer Academy	N/A
Mary Frances Symmes; MF	(United States)	Gulfport, Mississippi	Alabama FC	3/5 stars

== Squad ==
=== Roster ===
As of November 17, 2023

Note: Flags indicate national team as defined under FIFA eligibility rules; some limited exceptions apply. Players may hold more than one non-FIFA nationality.

No.	Pos.	Nation	Player
0	GK	USA	Aisley Snell
1	GK	USA	Olivia Pratapas
2	DF	ENG	Mackenzie Smith
3	DF	USA	Briana Weber
4	FW	USA	Leyah Hall-Robinson
5	DF	USA	Alex Mohr
7	MF	JPN	Emika Kawagishi
8	MF	CAN	Rosalie Olou
9	FW	USA	Hannah Jibril
10	MF	GER	Annika Wohner
11	DF	USA	Fernanda Soto
12	MF	USA	Jaiden Thomas
13	FW	USA	Jade Bordeleau
14	FW	USA	Mia Vaughan

No.	Pos.	Nation	Player
15	FW	USA	Jameese Joseph
17	FW	USA	Brianna Holt
18	DF	USA	Madison Reid
19	GK	ESP	María Echezarreta
20	DF	USA	Brooklyn Holt
21	MF	USA	Mary Frances Symmes
22	DF	USA	Taylor Chism
23	FW	USA	Alexis Strickland
25	MF	USA	Sarah Arnold
26	GK	USA	Emily Earles
27	MF	USA	Eliza Rich
28	MF	USA	Sophia Hernandez
29	FW	USA	Cienna Kim

=== Team management ===
Position	Staff
Athletic Director	Boo Corrigan
Head coach	Tim Santoro
Associate head coach	Sebastian Vecchio
Assistant Coach	Maddy Haro
Director of Operations	Kim Kern

== Schedule ==
Date Time, TV	Rank^{#}	Opponent^{#}	Result	Record	Site (Attendance) City, State
Exhibition
August 12*; 1:00 p.m.		VCU	None Reported		Dail Soccer Field; Raleigh, NC
Non-conference regular season
August 17*; 7:00 p.m., ACCNX		Utah	T 1–1	0–0–1	Dail Soccer Field (587); Raleigh, NC
August 20*; 7:00 p.m., ESPN+		at Charlotte	W 2–1	1–0–1	Transamerica Field (1,607); Charlotte, NC
August 24*; 7:00 p.m., ACCNX		Rutgers	T 1–1	1–0–2	Dail Soccer Field (1,462); Raleigh, NC
August 31*; 9:00 p.m., P12N+		at Colorado	L 1–2	1–1–2	Prentup Field (692); Boulder, CO
September 3*; 9:00 p.m., Midco Sports+		at Denver	L 2–4	1–2–2	Denver Soccer Stadium (457); Denver, CO
September 7*; 7:00 p.m., ACCNX		Michigan State	L 1–2	1–3–2	Dail Soccer Field (2,506); Raleigh, NC
September 10*; 12:00 p.m., ESPN+		at Harvard	L 0–2	1–4–2	Jordan Field (291); Boston, MA
September 14*; 7:00 p.m., ACCNX		High Point	T 2–2	1–4–3	Dail Soccer Field (1,082); Raleigh, NC
ACC regular season
September 17; 2:00 p.m., ACCN		Pittsburgh	L 0–2	1–5–3 (0–1–0)	Dail Soccer Field (331); Raleigh, NC
September 21; 8:00 p.m., ACCNX		at Wake Forest	T 1–1	1–5–4 (0–1–1)	Spry Stadium (762); Winston-Salem, NC
September 24; 6:00 p.m., ACCNX		at No. 16 Duke	T 0–0	1–5–5 (0–1–2)	Koskinen Stadium (786); Durham, NC
September 30; 7:00 p.m., ACCNX		No. 1 North Carolina; Rivalry	L 0–4	1–6–5 (0–2–2)	Dail Soccer Field (3,972); Raleigh, NC
October 5; 8:00 p.m., ACCN		at Virginia Tech	L 1–4	1–7–5 (0–3–2)	Thompson Field (412); Blacksburg, VA
October 8; 2:00 p.m., ACCN		Virginia	W 2–1	2–7–5 (1–3–2)	Dail Soccer Field (252); Raleigh, NC
October 14; 6:00 p.m., ACCNX		at Miami (FL)	T 0–0	2–7–6 (1–3–3)	Cobb Stadium (249); Coral Gables, FL
October 19; 7:00 p.m., ACCNX		Syracuse	W 2–0	3–7–6 (2–3–3)	Dail Soccer Field (884); Raleigh, NC
October 22; 1:00 p.m., ACCNX		No. 12 Notre Dame	L 0–1	3–8–6 (2–4–3)	Dail Soccer Field (464); Raleigh, NC
October 26; 7:00 p.m., ACCNX		at Florida State	L 0–5	3–9–6 (2–5–3)	Seminole Soccer Complex (1,189); Tallahassee, FL
*Non-conference game. ^{#}Rankings from United Soccer Coaches. (#) Tournament seedings in parentheses. All times are in Eastern.

== Awards and honors ==
Recipient	Award	Date	Ref.
Jameese Joseph	Pre-season All-ACC Team	August 11	
Jameese Joseph	All-ACC Third Team	November 1	

== Rankings ==
Ranking movements Legend: ██ Increase in ranking ██ Decrease in ranking — = Not ranked RV = Received votes
	Week																
Poll	Pre	1	2	3	4	5	6	7	8	9	10	11	12	13	14	15	Final
United Soccer	—	RV	—	—	—	—	—	—	—	—	—	—	Not released				—
TopDrawer Soccer	—	—	—	—	—	—	—	—	—	—	—	—	—	—	—	—	—

== 2024 NWSL Draft ==
NC State had one player selected in the 2024 NWSL Draft.

Player	Team	Round	Pick #	Position
(United States) Jameese Joseph	Chicago Red Stars	2	15	FW
