= 2023 Virginia Tech Hokies women's soccer team =

American college soccer season

2023 Virginia Tech Hokies women's soccer
- Conference: Atlantic Coast Conference
- Record: 7–8–3 (4–6–0 ACC)
- Head coach: Charles Adair (13th season)
- Assistant coaches: Drew Kopp (12th season); Matt Gwilliam (9th season)
- Home stadium: Thompson Field

2023 ACC women's soccer standings
	Conf.						Overall
Team	W		L		T	PCT	W		L		T	PCT
No. 1 Florida State ‍†‍‡‍^{y}	9	–	0	–	1	.950	22	–	0	–	1	.978
No. 16 Notre Dame ‍‍‍^{y}	7	–	1	–	2	.800	12	–	4	–	4	.700
No. 3 Clemson ‍‍‍^{y}	7	–	2	–	1	.750	18	–	4	–	4	.769
No. 8 North Carolina ‍‍‍^{y}	5	–	0	–	5	.750	13	–	2	–	8	.739
No. 6 Pittsburgh ‍‍‍^{y}	6	–	3	–	1	.650	17	–	6	–	1	.729
Wake Forest ‍‍‍	4	–	2	–	4	.600	10	–	3	–	5	.694
Virginia ‍‍‍	3	–	3	–	4	.500	8	–	3	–	6	.647
Virginia Tech ‍‍‍	4	–	6	–	0	.400	7	–	8	–	3	.472
Louisville ‍‍‍	3	–	5	–	2	.400	4	–	9	–	5	.361
Duke ‍‍‍	2	–	5	–	3	.350	6	–	7	–	3	.469
NC State ‍‍‍	2	–	5	–	3	.350	3	–	9	–	6	.333
Miami (FL) ‍‍‍	2	–	7	–	1	.250	3	–	10	–	4	.294
Boston College ‍‍‍	0	–	6	–	4	.200	3	–	9	–	6	.333
Syracuse ‍‍‍	0	–	9	–	1	.050	2	–	14	–	2	.167
† – Conference champion ‡ – 2023 ACC Tournament champion y – Invited to the NCAA Tournament; Source: The ACC; As of December 5, 2023; Rankings from United Soccer Coaches Poll

The 2023 Virginia Tech Hokies women's soccer team represented Virginia Tech during the 2023 NCAA Division I women's soccer season. It was the 31st season of the university fielding a program and 20th competing in the Atlantic Coast Conference. The Hokies were led by thirteenth year head coach Charles Adair and played their home games at Thompson Field.

The Hokies started the season with mixed results in non-conference as they began the season with a two wins in three games, but struggled against Power 5 competition. They played the twentieth ranked team twice in Georgetown and Northwestern, losing both contests. They ended the non-conference season with a 3–2–3 record. An ACC opening loss to North Carolina was only 0–1, and the Hokies won three of their next four games. However, they then went on a three-game losing skid before winning their penultimate game of the season. They would lose again to the twentieth ranked team in Pittsburgh to end the regular season.

They finished 7–8–3 overall and 4–6–0 in ACC play to finish in eighth place. They did not qualify for the ACC Tournament and were not invited to the NCAA Tournament. Their seven wins were the lowest since 2017 and they finished with four conference wins for the fourth time in five seasons. This year broke a streak of two straight NCAA appearances.

== Previous season ==
The Hokies finished 10–6–2 overall and 4–5–1 in ACC play to finish in eighth place. They did not qualify for the ACC Tournament as only six teams were invited. They received an at-large bid to the NCAA Tournament. As an unseeded team in the UCLA Bracket they traveled to seventh-seed West Virginia in the First Round. They lost the game 2–0 to end their season.

== Offseason ==
=== Departures ===
Departures
Name	Number	Pos.	Height	Year	Hometown	Reason for departure
Dale Burnett	0	GK	5'10"	(redshirt) Junior	Ashburn, Virginia	Graduated
Ines Obradovac	4	FW/MF	5'9"	Freshman	Woodstock, Georgia	Transferred to Wofford
Bella Pontieri	10	FW/MF	5'7"	Freshman	Jacksonville, Florida	Transferred to North Florida
Gabby Johnson	11	MF	5'3"	Graduate Student	Midlothian, Virginia	Graduated
Emmalee McCarter	24	FW/MF	5'6"	Graduate Student	Charleston, South Carolina	Graduated
Ella Ciardullo	28	FW/MF	5'5"	Freshman	Milton, Georgia	Transferred to Iowa State

=== Incoming transfers ===
Incoming transfers
Name	Number	Pos.	Height	Year	Hometown	Previous school
Eden Skyers	28	MF/DF	5'6"	Junior	London, England	Jacksonville

=== Recruiting class ===
Name	Nationality	Hometown	Club	TDS Rating
Ava Arengo; MF	(United States)	Mason, Ohio	Cincinnati United Premier	3/5 stars
Ella Bjorklund; DF	(United States)	Wake Forest, North Carolina	North Carolina Courage	3/5 stars
Samantha DeGuzman; FW	(United States)	Manassas, Virginia	Virginia Development Academy	4/5 stars
Ellie Farrell; MF	(United States)	Wilmington, North Carolina	Wilmington Hammerheads Youth	3/5 stars
Emma Garrelts; DF	(United States)	Park Ridge, Illinois	Sockers FC	3/5 stars
Kylie Marschall; DF	(United States)	Ashburn, Virginia	TSJ FC Virginia	3/5 stars
Savannah Sabo; GK	(United States)	Atlanta, Georgia	IMG Academy	4/5 stars
Anna Weir; FW	(United States)	Acworth, Georgia	Tophat SC	3/5 stars

== Squad ==
=== Roster ===
As of November 27, 2023

Note: Flags indicate national team as defined under FIFA eligibility rules; some limited exceptions apply. Players may hold more than one non-FIFA nationality.

No.	Pos.	Nation	Player
00	GK	USA	Lauren Hargrove
0	GK	USA	Savannah Sabo
1	GK	USA	Alia Skinner
3	FW	USA	Anna Weir
4	FW	USA	Emma Stanley
5	DF	FIN	Aino Vuorinen
7	MF	USA	Avery Tharrington
8	FW	USA	Ayden Yates
9	MF	USA	Courtney Andersen
13	DF	USA	Victoria Moser
14	DF	USA	Allie Lewis
15	FW	USA	Sophie Maltese
16	FW	USA	Allie George
17	MF	USA	Ella Bjorklund
18	MF	USA	Lauren Gogal
19	FW	USA	Samantha DeGuzman

No.	Pos.	Nation	Player
20	DF	USA	Victoria Haugen
21	DF	USA	Averi Visage
22	FW	USA	Taylor Bryan
23	FW	USA	Kate Bonshak
24	FW	USA	Natalie Mitchell
25	FW	USA	Taylor Price
26	MF	USA	Emma Pelkowski
27	DF	USA	Ava Veith
28	MF	ENG	Eden Skyers
29	MF	USA	Kendall DiMillio
31	DF	USA	Maysen Nelson
33	MF	USA	Ava Arengo
34	FW	USA	Ella Valente
35	MF	USA	Emma Garrelts
36	FW	USA	Ruby Darling
37	DF	USA	Kylie Marschall

== Team management ==
Position	Staff
Head coach	Charles Adair
Associate Head Coach	Drew Kopp
Assistant Coach	Matt Gwilliam

== Schedule ==
Date Time, TV	Rank^{#}	Opponent^{#}	Result	Record	Site (Attendance) City, State
Exhibition
August 9*		at East Tennessee State	None Reported	—	Summers-Taylor Stadium; Johnson City, TN
August 12*		at Liberty	None Reported	—	Osborne Stadium; Lynchburg, VA
Non-conference regular season
August 17*; 7:00 p.m., FloFC		at Butler	W 3–0	1–0–0	Butler Bowl (737); Indianapolis, IN
August 20*; 12:00 p.m., BTN+		at Indiana	T 0–0	1–0–1	Bill Armstrong Stadium (320); Bloomington, IN
August 24*; 7:00 p.m., ACCNX		James Madison	W 3–0	2–0–1	Thompson Field (1,162); Blacksburg, VA
August 27*; 1:00 p.m., BEN		at No. 20 Georgetown	L 0–1	2–1–1	Shaw Field (853); Washington, D.C.
August 31*; 5:00 p.m., ACCNX		Old Dominion	T 0–0	2–1–2	Thompson Field (658); Blacksburg, VA
September 3*; 5:00 p.m., ESPN+		at Charlotte	T 1–1	2–1–3	Transamerica Field (713); Charlotte, NC
September 7*; 6:00 p.m., ESPN+		at Navy	W 1–0	3–1–3	Glenn Warner Soccer Facility (874); Annapolis, MD
September 10*; 1:30 p.m., ACCNX		No. 20 Northwestern	L 2–3	3–2–3	Thompson Field (314); Blacksburg, VA
ACC regular season
September 15; 3:30 p.m., ACCNX		at No. 2 North Carolina	L 0–1	3–3–3 (0–1–0)	Dorrance Field (4,298); Chapel Hill, NC
September 21; 7:00 p.m., ACCNX		at Boston College	W 2–1	4–3–3 (1–1–0)	Newton Campus Soccer Field (333); Chestnut Hill, MA
September 24; 1:00 p.m., ACCNX		at Syracuse	W 4–0	5–3–3 (2–1–0)	SU Soccer Stadium (325); Syracuse, NY
September 29; 7:00 p.m., ACCNX		No. 25 Wake Forest	L 0–2	5–4–3 (2–2–0)	Thompson Field (1,107); Blacksburg, VA
October 5; 8:00 p.m., ACCN		NC State	W 4–1	6–4–3 (3–2–0)	Thompson Field (412); Blacksburg, VA
October 8; 3:00 p.m., ACCNX		No. 9 Clemson	L 0–1	6–5–3 (3–3–0)	Thompson Field (297); Blacksburg, VA
October 15; 1:30 p.m., ACCN		at Virginia; Rivalry	L 0–3	6–6–3 (3–4–0)	Klöckner Stadium (2,184); Charlottesville, VA
October 19; 7:00 p.m., ACCNX		Duke	L 0–1	6–7–3 (3–5–0)	Thompson Field (210); Blacksburg, VA
October 22; 3:00 p.m., ACCNX		Miami (FL)	W 3–0	7–7–3 (4–5–0)	Thompson Field (197); Blacksburg, VA
October 26; 7:00 p.m., ACCNX		at No. 20 Pittsburgh	L 1–2	7–8–3 (4–6–0)	Ambrose Urbanic Field (1,280); Pittsburgh, PA
*Non-conference game. ^{#}Rankings from United Soccer Coaches. (#) Tournament seedings in parentheses. All times are in Eastern.

== Awards and honors ==
Recipient	Award	Date	Ref.
Natalie Mitchell	All-ACC Third Team	November 1	

== Rankings ==
Ranking movements Legend: ██ Increase in ranking ██ Decrease in ranking — = Not ranked RV = Received votes
	Week																
Poll	Pre	1	2	3	4	5	6	7	8	9	10	11	12	13	14	15	Final
United Soccer	RV	RV	RV	—	—	—	—	—	—	—	—	—	Not released				—
TopDrawer Soccer	—	—	—	—	—	—	—	—	—	—	—	—	—	—	—	—	—
