= 2023 Louisville Cardinals women's soccer team =

2023 Louisville Cardinals women's soccer
- Conference: Atlantic Coast Conference
- Record: 4–9–5 (3–5–2 ACC)
- Head coach: Karen Ferguson-Dayes (24th season)
- Assistant coaches: Hunter Norton (8th season); Nick Stirrett (3rd season)
- Home stadium: Lynn Stadium

2023 ACC women's soccer standings
	Conf.						Overall
Team	W		L		T	PCT	W		L		T	PCT
No. 1 Florida State ‍†‍‡‍^{y}	9	–	0	–	1	.950	22	–	0	–	1	.978
No. 16 Notre Dame ‍‍‍^{y}	7	–	1	–	2	.800	12	–	4	–	4	.700
No. 3 Clemson ‍‍‍^{y}	7	–	2	–	1	.750	18	–	4	–	4	.769
No. 8 North Carolina ‍‍‍^{y}	5	–	0	–	5	.750	13	–	2	–	8	.739
No. 6 Pittsburgh ‍‍‍^{y}	6	–	3	–	1	.650	17	–	6	–	1	.729
Wake Forest ‍‍‍	4	–	2	–	4	.600	10	–	3	–	5	.694
Virginia ‍‍‍	3	–	3	–	4	.500	8	–	3	–	6	.647
Virginia Tech ‍‍‍	4	–	6	–	0	.400	7	–	8	–	3	.472
Louisville ‍‍‍	3	–	5	–	2	.400	4	–	9	–	5	.361
Duke ‍‍‍	2	–	5	–	3	.350	6	–	7	–	3	.469
NC State ‍‍‍	2	–	5	–	3	.350	3	–	9	–	6	.333
Miami (FL) ‍‍‍	2	–	7	–	1	.250	3	–	10	–	4	.294
Boston College ‍‍‍	0	–	6	–	4	.200	3	–	9	–	6	.333
Syracuse ‍‍‍	0	–	9	–	1	.050	2	–	14	–	2	.167
† – Conference champion ‡ – 2023 ACC Tournament champion y – Invited to the NCAA Tournament; Source: The ACC; As of December 5, 2023; Rankings from United Soccer Coaches Poll

The 2023 Louisville Cardinals women's soccer team represented University of Louisville during the 2023 NCAA Division I women's soccer season. The Cardinals were led by head coach Karen Ferguson-Dayes, in her twenty-fourth season. They played home games at Lynn Stadium. This was the team's 39th season playing organized women's college soccer and their 10th playing in the Atlantic Coast Conference.

The Cardinals had a rocky start to their non-conference season, with their first win not coming until September 3. That would be their only win during non-conference play and they finished with a 1–4–3 record. They only played one other power 5 school, Indiana, and the Cardinals lost 2–0. They began ACC play with a tie against Virginia who was ranked 20th at the time, and a win over Pittsburgh. However, that momentum did not continue as they lost their next three games. They mustered two more wins during conference play, against Syracuse and 25th ranked Duke to end the season.

The Cardinals finished the season 4–9–5 overall and 3–5–2 in ACC play to finish in ninth place. The team did not qualify for the ACC Tournament and were not invited to the NCAA Tournament. Their four overall wins, were the lowest for the team since 2001. Their three conference wins matched their total in the last two years.

== Previous season ==
The Cardinals finished the season 6–8–2 overall and 3–7–0 in ACC play to finish in tenth place. The team did not qualify for the ACC Tournament and were not invited to the NCAA Tournament.

== Offseason ==
=== Departures ===
Departures
Name	Number	Pos.	Height	Year	Hometown	Reason for departure
Olivia Pratapas	0	GK	5'9"	Sophomore	Clemmons, North Carolina	Transferred to NC State
Sarah Hernandez	2	DF	5'4"	Graduate Student	Moorpark, California	Graduated
Patricia Ward	3	FW	5'6"	Graduate Student	Newport News, Virginia	Graduated
Riley Mullady	6	MF	5'5"	Junior	Dublin, Ohio	Transferred to NYU
Lilly Yordy	9	DF	5'4"	Junior	Hamilton, Ohio	Transferred to Northern Kentucky
Corinne Dente	12	FW	5'5"	Senior	Stamford, Connecticut	Graduated
Riley Goss	17	MF	5'7"	Freshman	Suffolk, Virginia	Transferred to James Madison
Anouk Denton	18	DF	5'4"	Sophomore	St. Albans, England	Signed professional contract with West Ham
Maisie Whitsett	19	MF/FW	5'9"	Senior	San Diego, California	Graduated
Evelyn Pazienza	29	FW/MF	5'7"	Freshman	Wilton, Connecticut	Transferred to North Dakota

=== Incoming transfers ===
Incoming transfers
Name	Number	Pos.	Height	Year	Hometown	Previous school
Malene Nielsen	0	GK	5'11"	Junior	Juelsminde, Denmark	Fairleigh Dickinson
Lucy Roberts	6	DF	5'10"	Graduate Student	Cheshire, England	South Florida
Amber Jackson	7	FW	5'6"	Senior	Susanville, California	Oregon State
Maya Anand	17	FW	5'4"	Graduate Student	Leesburg, Virginia	Binghamton

=== Recruiting class ===
Name	Nationality	Hometown	Club	TDS Rating
Molly Cochran; MF	(United States)	Madeira, Ohio	Ohio Elite SA	2/5 stars
Fiona Gaißer; FW	(Germany)	Munich, Germany	Bayern Munich II	N/A
Betsy Huckaby; MF	(United States)	Crestwood, Kentucky	Racing Louisville Academy	N/A
Emma Sanchez; DF	(United States)	Camas, Washington	Northwest Elite	3/5 stars
Viktoria Wik; MF	(Denmark)	Roskilde, Denmark	HB Køge	N/A

== Squad ==
=== Roster ===
As of November 21, 2023

Note: Flags indicate national team as defined under FIFA eligibility rules; some limited exceptions apply. Players may hold more than one non-FIFA nationality.

No.	Pos.	Nation	Player
0	GK	DEN	Malene Nielsen
1	GK	CAN	Alyssa Zalac
2	MF	USA	Betsy Huckaby
3	FW	USA	Mackenzie Geigle
4	FW	USA	Emma Hiscock
5	FW	USA	Ravin Alexander
6	DF	ENG	Lucy Roberts
7	FW	USA	Amber Jackson
8	MF	USA	Maya Maxwell
9	MF	USA	Molly Cochran
10	DF	USA	Autumn Weeks
11	MF	USA	Addie Chester
13	MF	USA	Ava Nielson
14	MF	USA	Lizzie Sexton

No.	Pos.	Nation	Player
15	MF	USA	Hayley Howard
18	MF	DEN	Wiktoria Wik
19	FW	GER	Fiona Gaißer
20	FW	USA	Savina Zamborini
21	DF	USA	Sophia Zinn
22	DF	USA	Karsyn Cherry
23	MF	USA	Morgan Bentley
25	DF	USA	Hadley Snyder
26	MF	USA	Emma Kate Schroll
27	FW	USA	Emersen Jennings
28	MF	USA	Brooke Dardano
30	GK	USA	Erynn Floyd
32	DF	USA	Madison Ellsworth

=== Team management ===
Position	Staff
Karen Ferguson-Dayes	Head coach
Hunter Norton	Associate Head Coach
Nick Stirrett	Assistant Coach
Declan Doherty	Performance Analyst
Jing Hughley	Director of Operations

== Schedule ==
Date Time, TV	Rank^{#}	Opponent^{#}	Result	Record	Site (Attendance) City, State
Exhibition
August 6*; 2:00 p.m.		at Miami (OH)	None Reported	–	Bobby Kramig Field; Oxford, OH
Non-conference regular season
August 17*; 7:30 p.m., ACCNX		Indiana State	T 0–0	0–0–1	Lynn Stadium (437); Louisville, KY
August 20*; 7:30 p.m., FloFC		at Xavier	L 0–2	0–1–1	Corcoran Field (1,682); Cincinnati, OH
August 24*; 7:00 p.m., FloFC		at Dayton	L 1–2	0–2–1	Baujan Field (724); Dayton, OH
August 27*; 7:30 p.m., ACCNX		Northern Kentucky	T 0–0	0–2–2	Lynn Stadium (362); Louisville, KY
August 31*; 7:30 p.m., ACCNX		Illinois	L 1–2	0–3–2	Lynn Stadium (372); Louisville, KY
September 3*; 7:30 p.m., ACCNX		Central Michigan	W 3–0	1–3–2	Lynn Stadium (395); Louisville, KY
September 7*; 7:00 p.m., BTN+		at Indiana	L 0–2	1–4–2	Bill Armstrong Stadium (413); Bloomington, IN
September 10*; 5:30 p.m., ACCNX		Wyoming	T 2–2	1–4–3	Lynn Stadium (213); Louisville, KY
ACC regular season
September 16; 7:00 p.m., ACCNX		No. 20 Virginia	T 1–1	1–4–4 (0–0–1)	Lynn Stadium (221); Louisville, KY
September 21; 8:00 p.m., ACCN		Pittsburgh	W 3–2	2–4–4 (1–0–1)	Lynn Stadium (279); Louisville, KY
September 24; 12:00 p.m., ACCNX		at Miami (FL)	L 0–1	2–5–4 (1–1–1)	Cobb Stadium (214); Coral Gables, FL
September 30; 7:00 p.m., ACCNX		at No. 10 Notre Dame	L 0–3	2–6–4 (1–2–1)	Alumni Stadium (450); Notre Dame, IN
October 5; 7:00 p.m., ACCNX		No. 2 Florida State	L 0–2	2–7–4 (1–3–1)	Lynn Stadium (198); Louisville, KY
October 8; 1:00 p.m., ACCNX		Syracuse	W 2–1	3–7–4 (2–3–1)	Lynn Stadium (227); Louisville, KY
October 14; 7:00 p.m., ACCNX		at Boston College	T 1–1	3–7–5 (2–3–2)	Newton Campus Soccer Field (471); Chestnut Hill, MA
October 19; 7:00 p.m., ACCNX		at No. 8 Clemson	L 0–3	3–8–5 (2–4–2)	Riggs Field (362); Clemson, SC
October 22; 12:30 p.m., ACCNX		at Wake Forest	L 0–1	3–9–5 (2–5–2)	Spry Stadium (620); Winston-Salem, NC
October 26; 6:00 p.m., ACCNX		No. 25т Duke	W 1–0	4–9–5 (3–5–2)	Lynn Stadium (405); Louisville, KY
*Non-conference game. ^{#}Rankings from United Soccer Coaches. (#) Tournament seedings in parentheses.

== Awards and honors ==
Recipient	Award	Date	Ref.
Emma Hiscock	ACC Offensive Player of the Week	October 31	
Lucy Roberts	All-ACC Third Team	November 1	

== Rankings ==
Ranking movements Legend: — = Not ranked
	Week																
Poll	Pre	1	2	3	4	5	6	7	8	9	10	11	12	13	14	15	Final
United Soccer	—	—	—	—	—	—	—	—	—	—	—	—	Not released				—
TopDrawer Soccer	—	—	—	—	—	—	—	—	—	—	—	—	—	—	—	—	—
