= 2023 Miami Hurricanes women's soccer team =

2023 Miami Hurricanes women's soccer
- Conference: Atlantic Coast Conference
- Record: 3–10–4 (2–7–1 ACC)
- Head coach: Sarah Barnes (6th season)
- Assistant coaches: Alan Fread (6th season); Jeremy Williams (6th season); Kayley Sullivan (1st season)
- Home stadium: Cobb Stadium

2023 ACC women's soccer standings
	Conf.						Overall
Team	W		L		T	PCT	W		L		T	PCT
No. 1 Florida State ‍†‍‡‍^{y}	9	–	0	–	1	.950	22	–	0	–	1	.978
No. 16 Notre Dame ‍‍‍^{y}	7	–	1	–	2	.800	12	–	4	–	4	.700
No. 3 Clemson ‍‍‍^{y}	7	–	2	–	1	.750	18	–	4	–	4	.769
No. 8 North Carolina ‍‍‍^{y}	5	–	0	–	5	.750	13	–	2	–	8	.739
No. 6 Pittsburgh ‍‍‍^{y}	6	–	3	–	1	.650	17	–	6	–	1	.729
Wake Forest ‍‍‍	4	–	2	–	4	.600	10	–	3	–	5	.694
Virginia ‍‍‍	3	–	3	–	4	.500	8	–	3	–	6	.647
Virginia Tech ‍‍‍	4	–	6	–	0	.400	7	–	8	–	3	.472
Louisville ‍‍‍	3	–	5	–	2	.400	4	–	9	–	5	.361
Duke ‍‍‍	2	–	5	–	3	.350	6	–	7	–	3	.469
NC State ‍‍‍	2	–	5	–	3	.350	3	–	9	–	6	.333
Miami (FL) ‍‍‍	2	–	7	–	1	.250	3	–	10	–	4	.294
Boston College ‍‍‍	0	–	6	–	4	.200	3	–	9	–	6	.333
Syracuse ‍‍‍	0	–	9	–	1	.050	2	–	14	–	2	.167
† – Conference champion ‡ – 2023 ACC Tournament champion y – Invited to the NCAA Tournament; Source: The ACC; As of December 5, 2023; Rankings from United Soccer Coaches Poll

The 2023 Miami Hurricanes women's soccer team represented University of Miami during the 2023 NCAA Division I women's soccer season. The Hurricanes were led by head coach Sarah Barnes, in her sixth season. They played home games at Cobb Stadium. This was the team's 25th season playing organized women's college soccer and their 20th playing in the Atlantic Coast Conference.

The Hurricanes' season started with a promising 3–0 victory, but they could not carry forward that momentum. They would draw their next two games and lose three of their last four to finish their non-conference schedule 1–3–3. A highlight was a 0–0 draw with then fifth ranked Alabama. The Hurricanes started ACC play well, winning two of their first three games. However, their momentum stalled with three losses to ranked teams. A draw broke the losing streak, but another streak began as Miami lost their last three conference games.

The Hurricanes finished the season 3–10–4 overall and 2–7–1 in ACC play to finish in twelfth place. They did not qualify for the ACC Tournament and were not invited to the NCAA Tournament. Their three wins were a program low for a full season, with only the shortened 2020 season resulting in fewer wins. This was the second year in a row Miami finished with a 2–7–1 conference record, and the third time in Barnes' tenure. After the season, it was announced that Barnes would no longer continue as head coach.

== Previous season ==
The Hurricanes finished the season 5–8–3 overall and 2–7–1 in ACC play to finish in twelfth place. They did not qualify for the ACC Tournament and were not invited to the NCAA Tournament.

== Offseason ==
=== Departures ===
Departures
Name	Number	Pos.	Height	Year	Hometown	Reason for departure
Gabriela Rusek	6	DF	5'6"	Junior	Warwick, New York	—
Chloe O'Neill	12	FW	5'2"	Graduate Student	Fort Lauderdale, Florida	Graduated
Jackie Koerwitz	16	FW	6'1"	(redshirt) Junior	Sacramento, California	Graduated
María Jakobsdóttir	17	MF/FW	5'4"	Senior	Garðabær, Iceland	Graduated
Mikayla Tupper	24	FW/MF	5'8"	Sophomore	Langley, Canada	Transferred to Simon Fraser (CAN)
Annie Blair	28	MF	5'8"	Junior	McLean, Virginia	—
Jaclyn Marra	31	FW	5'1"	Senior	Clarkston, Michigan	Graduated

=== Recruiting class ===
Name	Nationality	Hometown	Club	TDS Rating
Gianna Angelillo; MF	(United States)	Glastonbury, Connecticut	FC Sporting (CA)	N/A
Sophia Broz; DF	(United States)	Matthews, North Carolina	Charlotte Soccer Academy	2/5 stars
Moira Flynn; FW	(United States)	Arlington, Virginia	Virginia Union	N/A
Claireese Foley; GK	(United States)	Prosper, Texas	DKSC	3/5 stars
Nyema Freeman; DF	(United States)	Cooper City, Florida	Tampa Bay United	3/5 stars
Caroline Hood; FW	(United States)	Needham, Massachusetts	FC Stars of Massachusetts	3/5 stars
Emilie McCartney; DF	(United States)	McKinney, Texas	DKSC	3/5 stars
Sonia Neighbors; MF	(United States)	Montclair, New Jersey	Matanuska SC	N/A

== Squad ==
=== Roster ===
As of November 15, 2023

Note: Flags indicate national team as defined under FIFA eligibility rules; some limited exceptions apply. Players may hold more than one non-FIFA nationality.

No.	Pos.	Nation	Player
00	GK	USA	Claireese Foley
0	GK	CAN	Melissa Dagenais
2	FW	CAN	Maya Rogers
3	DF	USA	Adrianna Serna
4	DF	USA	Emilie McCartney
5	MF	USA	Claire Llewellyn
6	FW	USA	Sonia Neighbors
7	FW	USA	Caroline Hood
8	DF	USA	Sophia Broz
9	FW	USA	Tusca Mahmoudpour
10	MF	USA	Julia Edwards
11	MF	USA	Zoey Lee
12	MF	USA	Gianna Angelillo
13	MF	USA	Katerina Molina

No.	Pos.	Nation	Player
14	FW	USA	Emma Pidding
15	DF	USA	Hanna Dawbarn
17	FW	USA	Moira Flynn
18	DF	USA	Jordan Losey
19	DF	USA	Delaney Brown
20	DF	USA	Reese Wheeler
21	MF	USA	Lauren Meeks
22	FW	USA	Taylor Shell
23	MF	USA	Jordan Felton
25	FW	USA	Megan Morgan
26	MF	USA	Emma Tucker
27	GK	USA	Skylah Klein
29	DF	USA	Hallie Salas
30	DF	USA	Nyema Freeman

=== Team management ===
Position	Staff
Head coach	Sarah Barnes
Assistant Coach	Jeremy Williams
Assistant Coach	Alan Fread
Assistant Coach	Kayley Sullivan

== Schedule ==
Date Time, TV	Rank^{#}	Opponent^{#}	Result	Record	Site (Attendance) City, State
Exhibition
August 6*		No. 24 UCF	L 0–1	–	Cobb Stadium; Coral Gables, FL
August 12*; 1:00 p.m., ESPN+		at Florida Gulf Coast	W 2–1	–	FGCU Soccer Complex; Fort Myers, FL
Non-conference regular season
August 17*; 5:00 p.m.		at Stetson	W 3–0	1–0–0	Athletic Training Center (102); DeLand, FL
August 20*; 6:00 p.m., ACCNX		Florida Atlantic	T 1–1	1–0–1	Cobb Stadium (334); Coral Gables, FL
August 24*; 6:00 p.m., ACCNX		Florida; Rivalry	T 0–0	1–0–2	Cobb Stadium (405); Coral Gables, FL
August 27*; 1:00 p.m., ACCNX		Georgia Southern	L 1–2	1–1–2	Cobb Stadium (168); Coral Gables, FL
August 31*; 7:00 p.m., SECN+		at No. 5 Alabama	T 0–0	1–1–3	Alabama Soccer Stadium (874); Tuscaloosa, AL
September 3*; 1:00 p.m., SECN+		at Mississippi State	L 1–2	1–2–3	MSU Soccer Park (242); Starkville, MS
September 7*; 7:00 p.m., ACCNX		at FIU	L 0–1	1–3–3	FIU Soccer Stadium (650); Miami, FL
ACC regular season
September 15; 6:00 p.m., ACCNX		Syracuse	W 2–1	2–3–3 (1–0–0)	Cobb Stadium (272); Coral Gables, FL
September 21; 6:00 p.m., ACCN		No. 8 Clemson	L 0–5	2–4–3 (1–1–0)	Cobb Stadium (184); Coral Gables, FL
September 24; 12:00 p.m., ACCNX		Louisville	W 1–0	3–4–3 (2–1–0)	Cobb Stadium (214); Coral Gables, FL
September 29; 7:00 p.m., ACCNX		at No. 2 Florida State; Rivalry	L 0–2	3–5–3 (2–2–0)	Seminole Soccer Complex (1,978); Tallahassee, FL
October 5; 7:00 p.m., ACCNX		at No. 1 North Carolina	L 0–1	3–6–3 (2–3–0)	Dorrance Field (2,892); Chapel Hill, NC
October 8; 1:00 p.m., ACCNX		at No. 11 Notre Dame	L 2–7	3–7–3 (2–4–0)	Alumni Stadium (407); Notre Dame, IN
October 14; 6:00 p.m., ACCNX		NC State	T 0–0	3–7–4 (2–4–1)	Cobb Stadium (249); Coral Gables, FL
October 19; 7:00 p.m., ACCNX		at Virginia	L 0–1	3–8–4 (2–5–1)	Klöckner Stadium (1,419); Charlottesville, VA
October 22; 3:00 p.m., ACCNX		at Virginia Tech	L 0–3	3–9–4 (2–6–1)	Thompson Field (197); Blacksburg, VA
October 26; 6:00 p.m., ACCN		Wake Forest	L 0–2	3–10–4 (2–7–1)	Cobb Stadium (196); Coral Gables, FL
*Non-conference game. ^{#}Rankings from United Soccer Coaches. (#) Tournament seedings in parentheses.

== Rankings ==
Ranking movements Legend: — = Not ranked
	Week																
Poll	Pre	1	2	3	4	5	6	7	8	9	10	11	12	13	14	15	Final
United Soccer	—	—	—	—	—	—	—	—	—	—	—	—	Not released				—
TopDrawer Soccer	—	—	—	—	—	—	—	—	—	—	—	—	—	—	—	—	—
