= 2023 Syracuse Orange women's soccer team =

American college soccer season

2023 Syracuse Orange women's soccer
- Conference: Atlantic Coast Conference
- Record: 2–14–2 (0–9–1 ACC)
- Head coach: Nicky Adams (5th season)
- Assistant coaches: Brandon DeNoyer (4th season); Alex Zaroyan (1st season)
- Home stadium: SU Soccer Stadium

2023 ACC women's soccer standings
| | Conf. | | | | | | Overall |
| Team | W | | L | | T | PCT | W | | L | | T | PCT |
|---|---|---|---|---|---|---|---|---|---|---|---|---|
| No. 1 Florida State ‍†‍‡‍^{y} | 9 | – | 0 | – | 1 | .950 | 22 | – | 0 | – | 1 | .978 |
| No. 16 Notre Dame ‍‍‍^{y} | 7 | – | 1 | – | 2 | .800 | 12 | – | 4 | – | 4 | .700 |
| No. 3 Clemson ‍‍‍^{y} | 7 | – | 2 | – | 1 | .750 | 18 | – | 4 | – | 4 | .769 |
| No. 8 North Carolina ‍‍‍^{y} | 5 | – | 0 | – | 5 | .750 | 13 | – | 2 | – | 8 | .739 |
| No. 6 Pittsburgh ‍‍‍^{y} | 6 | – | 3 | – | 1 | .650 | 17 | – | 6 | – | 1 | .729 |
| Wake Forest ‍‍‍ | 4 | – | 2 | – | 4 | .600 | 10 | – | 3 | – | 5 | .694 |
| Virginia ‍‍‍ | 3 | – | 3 | – | 4 | .500 | 8 | – | 3 | – | 6 | .647 |
| Virginia Tech ‍‍‍ | 4 | – | 6 | – | 0 | .400 | 7 | – | 8 | – | 3 | .472 |
| Louisville ‍‍‍ | 3 | – | 5 | – | 2 | .400 | 4 | – | 9 | – | 5 | .361 |
| Duke ‍‍‍ | 2 | – | 5 | – | 3 | .350 | 6 | – | 7 | – | 3 | .469 |
| NC State ‍‍‍ | 2 | – | 5 | – | 3 | .350 | 3 | – | 9 | – | 6 | .333 |
| Miami (FL) ‍‍‍ | 2 | – | 7 | – | 1 | .250 | 3 | – | 10 | – | 4 | .294 |
| Boston College ‍‍‍ | 0 | – | 6 | – | 4 | .200 | 3 | – | 9 | – | 6 | .333 |
| Syracuse ‍‍‍ | 0 | – | 9 | – | 1 | .050 | 2 | – | 14 | – | 2 | .167 |
† – Conference champion ‡ – 2023 ACC Tournament champion y – Invited to the NCAA Tournament; Source: The ACC; As of December 5, 2023; Rankings from United Soccer Coaches Poll

The 2023 Syracuse Orange women's soccer team represented Syracuse University during the 2023 NCAA Division I women's soccer season. The Orange were led by head coach Nicky Adams, in her fifth season. They played home games at SU Soccer Stadium. This was the team's 27th season playing organized women's college soccer, and their 10th playing in the Atlantic Coast Conference.

The Orange started the season winning two of their first four games, but would go on to lose their next three games. A tie with Farifeld saw them end non-conference play with a 2–5–1 record. The Orange played five ranked opponents during ACC play. They struggled, losing their first four games and their last five games. The streak was broken in the middle with a 2–2 tie with Wake Forest. The Orange finished the season 2–14–2, 0–9–1 in ACC play to finish fourteenth place. Their two wins were their lowest total in a full season. They only recorded 1 win in a shortened 2020 campaign. They did not qualify for the ACC Tournament. They were not invited to the NCAA Tournament.

== Previous season ==
The Orange finished the season 8–7–3, 1–6–3 in ACC play to finish thirteenth place. They did not qualify for the ACC Tournament. They were not invited to the NCAA Tournament.

== Offseason ==
=== Departures ===
Departures
| Name | Number | Pos. | Height | Year | Hometown | Reason for departure |
|---|---|---|---|---|---|---|
| Michaela Walsh | 0 | GK | 5'7" | Senior | Florham Park, New Jersey | Graduated |
| Sierra Giorgio | 1 | GK | 5'6" | (redshirt) Freshman | Vaughn, Canada | Transferred to Oklahoma |
| Pauline Machtens | 6 | MF | 5'6" | Sophomore | Leverkusen, Germany | — |
| Blue Ellis | 7 | FW | 5'5" | Graduate Student | Collierville, Tennessee | Graduated |
| Jenna Tivnan | 11 | DF | 5'8" | Graduate Student | Easton, Massachusetts | Graduated |
| Koby Commandant | 16 | MF | 5'5" | Sophomore | Rockwood, Canada | Transferred to Oklahoma |
| Chelsea Domond | 21 | FW | 5'5" | Graduate Student | Stamford, Connecticut | Graduated |
| Gianna Savella | 22 | MF | 5'6" | Freshman | Massapequa Park, New York | — |
| Florence Vaillancourt | 23 | FW | 5'9" | Senior | Quebec City, Canada | Graduated |
| Rebekah Doolittle | 24 | DF | 5'6" | Freshman | Beaverdam, Virginia | Transferred to Lipscomb |

=== Incoming transfers ===
Incoming transfers
| Name | Number | Pos. | Height | Year | Hometown | Previous school |
|---|---|---|---|---|---|---|
| Abby Ross | 1 | GK | 5'6" | (redshirt) Sophomore | Rock Hill, South Carolina | Furman |
| Ava Uribe | 7 | FW | 5'5" | (redshirt) Freshman | Sammamish, Washington | Penn State |
| Mackenzie Dupre | 21 | MF | 5'8" | Sophomore | Pittsburgh, Pennsylvania | Towson |

=== Recruiting class ===
| Name | Nationality | Hometown | Club | TDS Rating |
|---|---|---|---|---|
| Samantha Haley; GK | (United States) | Syracuse, New York | Syracuse Development Academy | 2/5 stars |
| Caro Monterrey; DF | (United States) | Miami, Florida | FC Prime | N/A |

== Squad ==
=== Roster ===
As of August 21, 2023

Note: Flags indicate national team as defined under FIFA eligibility rules; some limited exceptions apply. Players may hold more than one non-FIFA nationality.

| No. | Pos. | Nation | Player |
|---|---|---|---|
| 0 | GK | USA | Sam Haley |
| 1 | GK | USA | Abby Ross |
| 2 | MF | USA | Liesel Odden |
| 3 | MF | USA | Margaret Thornton |
| 4 | FW | USA | Ashley Rauch |
| 5 | DF | USA | Alyssa Abramson |
| 7 | FW | USA | Ava Uribe |
| 8 | DF | BEL | Zoe van de Cloot |
| 9 | DF | USA | Kendyl Lauher |
| 10 | FW | NZL | Hannah Pilley |
| 12 | DF | USA | Aleena Ulke |
| 13 | FW | USA | Anna Rupert |

| No. | Pos. | Nation | Player |
|---|---|---|---|
| 14 | DF | USA | Kate Murphy |
| 15 | FW | USA | Maya McDermott |
| 17 | DF | CAN | Kylen Grant |
| 18 | FW | USA | Aysia Cobb |
| 19 | FW | USA | Raia James |
| 20 | DF | USA | Emma Klein |
| 21 | MF | USA | Mackenzie Dupre |
| 24 | DF | USA | Caro Monterrey |
| 25 | DF | USA | Grace Franklin |
| 26 | FW | USA | Erin Flurey |
| 27 | DF | ENG | Grace Gillard |
| 30 | GK | USA | Shea Vanderbosch |

=== Team management ===
| Position | Staff |
|---|---|
| Head coach | Nicky Thrasher Adams |
| Assistant coach | Brandon DeNoyer |
| Assistant coach | Alex Zaroyan |

== Schedule ==
| Date Time, TV | Rank^{#} | Opponent^{#} | Result | Record | Site (Attendance) City, State |
Exhibition
| August 10*; 7:00 p.m. | | St. Bonaventure | W 3–1 | – | SU Soccer Stadium; Syracuse, NY |
| August 13*; 6:00 p.m. | | Albany | W 6–1 | – | SU Soccer Stadium; Syracuse, NY |
Non-conference regular season
| August 17*; 6:00 p.m., FloFC | | at Delaware | L 0–1 | 0–1–0 | Grant Stadium (312); Newark, DE |
| August 20*; 1:00 p.m., ESPN3 | | at Siena | W 3–0 | 1–1–0 | Siena Field (283); Loudonville, NY |
| August 24*; 3:00 p.m., ACCNX | | Auburn | L 1–2 | 1–2–0 | SU Soccer Stadium (137); Syracuse, NY |
| August 27*; 7:00 p.m., ACCNX | | Binghamton | W 2–1 | 2–2–0 | SU Soccer Stadium (747); Syracuse, NY |
| August 31*; 4:00 p.m., ESPN+ | | at UMass | L 0–2 | 2–3–0 | Rudd Field (200); Amherst, MA |
| September 3*; 1:00 p.m., ESPN+ | | at Cornell | L 0–1 | 2–4–0 | Berman Field (592); Ithaca, NY |
| September 7*; 7:00 p.m., ESPN+ | | at Harvard | L 2–5 | 2–5–0 | Jordan Field (387); Boston, MA |
| September 10*; 1:00 p.m., ESPN+ | | at Fairfield | T 0–0 | 2–5–1 | Lessing Field (617); Fairfield, CT |
ACC regular season
| September 15; 7:00 p.m., ACCN | | at Miami (FL) | L 1–2 | 2–6–1 (0–1–0) | Cobb Stadium (272); Coral Gables, FL |
| September 21; 7:00 p.m., ACCNX | | No. 3 Florida State | L 2–3 | 2–7–1 (0–2–0) | SU Soccer Stadium (207); Syracuse, NY |
| September 24; 1:00 p.m., ACCNX | | Virginia Tech | L 0–4 | 2–8–1 (0–3–0) | SU Soccer Stadium (325); Syracuse, NY |
| September 30; 7:00 p.m., ACCNX | | at No. 8 Clemson | L 1–5 | 2–9–1 (0–4–0) | Riggs Field (932); Clemson, SC |
| October 5; 6:00 p.m., ACCN | | No. 17 Wake Forest | T 2–2 | 2–9–2 (0–4–1) | SU Soccer Stadium (153); Syracuse, NY |
| October 8; 1:00 p.m., ACCNX | | at Louisville | L 1–2 | 2–10–2 (0–5–1) | Lynn Stadium (227); Louisville, KY |
| October 14; 1:00 p.m., ACCNX | | No. 17 Pittsburgh | L 0–2 | 2–11–2 (0–6–1) | SU Soccer Stadium (187); Syracuse, NY |
| October 19; 7:00 p.m., ACCNX | | at NC State | L 0–2 | 2–12–2 (0–7–1) | Dail Soccer Field (884); Raleigh, NC |
| October 22; 1:00 p.m., ACCNX | | at No. 3 North Carolina | L 0–2 | 2–13–2 (0–8–1) | Dorrance Field (884); Chapel Hill, NC |
| October 26; 7:00 p.m., ACCNX | | Virginia | L 0–4 | 2–14–2 (0–9–1) | SU Soccer Stadium (102); Syracuse, NY |
*Non-conference game. ^{#}Rankings from United Soccer Coaches. (#) Tournament seedings in parentheses.

== Rankings ==
Ranking movements Legend: — = Not ranked
| | Week | | | | | | | | | | | | | | | | |
| Poll | Pre | 1 | 2 | 3 | 4 | 5 | 6 | 7 | 8 | 9 | 10 | 11 | 12 | 13 | 14 | 15 | Final |
|---|---|---|---|---|---|---|---|---|---|---|---|---|---|---|---|---|---|
| United Soccer | — | — | — | — | — | — | — | — | — | — | — | — | Not released | | | | — |
| TopDrawer Soccer | — | — | — | — | — | — | — | — | — | — | — | — | — | — | — | — | — |
