= Chris Petrucelli =

American soccer coach

Personal information
- Full name: Christopher Joseph Petrucelli
- Date of birth: May 9, 1962 (age 64)
- Place of birth: Orange, New Jersey, U.S.

Team information
- Current team: Dallas Trinity FC (General Manager)

Youth career
- 1976–1980: J. P. Stevens Hawks

College career
Years	Team	Apps	(Gls)
1980–1983	UNC Greensboro Spartans		

Managerial career
- 1985: Old Dominion Monarchs (men's, grad. assistant)
- 1986–1990: Old Dominion Monarchs (men's, assistant)
- 1990: Notre Dame Fighting Irish (men's, assistant)
- 1990–1998: Notre Dame Fighting Irish
- 1999–2011: Texas Longhorns
- 2003–2004: United States U21
- 2012–2022: SMU Mustangs
- 2020: United States U18
- 2022–2023: Chicago Red Stars
- 2024–: Dallas Trinity (General Manager)
- 2025: Dallas Trinity (interim)

Christopher Joseph Petrucelli (born May 9, 1962) is an American soccer executive who is the general manager for Dallas Trinity FC of the USL Super League (USLS), a position he has held since 2024.

== Playing career ==
Raised in Edison, New Jersey, Petrucelli attended J. P. Stevens High School, where he played for the soccer team. In college, he played in 1980, 1982, and 1983 for UNC Greensboro, then a Division III school, under head coach Mike Berticelli. He helped the school to two NCAA Division III Men's Soccer Championship titles in 1982 and 1983, and was the team captain in his senior year.

In 1998, Petrucelli was inducted into the inaugural hall of fame class of J. P. Stevens High School.

== Coaching career ==
After graduating from college in 1985, Petrucelli joined Berticelli, his former coach at UNC Greensboro, as a graduate assistant coach for the Old Dominion men's soccer program. At the time, he worked at the docks in Norfolk, Virginia, for a tea-packing company. He became a full-time assistant coach from 1986, with the school achieving their best result in his final season by reaching the NCAA tournament for the first time in 1989. In 1990, Petrucelli followed Berticelli to the University of Notre Dame. Berticelli had agreed to join Notre Dame, on the condition that the school would find a position for Petrucelli as well. Petrucelli was appointed as the head coach of Notre Dame's women's soccer team in the team's third season of existence, and also assisted Berticelli with the men's team in the first year. Petrucelli led Notre Dame to six consecutive appearances in the NCAA Division I Women's Soccer Championship from 1993 to 1998, including three straight appearances in the championship game from 1994 to 1996. The school won the 1995 championship 1–0 against Portland after three overtime periods, ending North Carolina's run of nine consecutive titles, with Notre Dame having defeated them 1–0 in the semi-finals. Notre Dame lost both the 1994 and 1996 championship games to North Carolina, by a score of 5–0 and 1–0 (after double overtime), respectively. In 1994 and 1995, he was named Women's College Soccer Coach of the Year by the NSCAA. He finished with a record of 175 wins, 22 losses, and 10 draws with the school.

He also served as the head soccer coach at the U.S. Olympic Festival in 1994 and 1995, and has worked as a coach for the Olympic Development Program.

In December 1998, Petrucelli was announced as the head coach of the Texas Longhorns women's soccer team for the following season. He coached the school to first place during the regular season in the Big 12 Conference in 2001, and won the Big 12 Tournament in 2006 and 2007. From 2001 to 2011, the school made ten appearances in the NCAA Division I Tournament, only missing out during this stretch in 2009. Their best result in the tournament was reaching the last 16, achieved in 2004, 2006, and 2007. He finished with a record of 165 wins, 88 losses, and 26 draws while at Texas. From 2003 to 2004, Petrucelli also served as the coach of the United States women's national under-21 team, and won consecutive Nordic Cup titles.

In 2012, Petrucelli became the head coach of Southern Methodist University women's soccer team. During his tenure, SMU made two appearances in the NCAA Division I Tournament in 2016 and 2021. In total, he finished with a record of 88 wins, 74 losses and 18 draws at the school. In January 2020, he also was the coach of the United States women's national under-18 team for the Tricontinental Cup tournament in Lakewood Ranch, Florida, in which the U.S. finished second to the Netherlands.

On February 18, 2022, the Chicago Red Stars announced Petrucelli as the coach of the team for the 2022 season in the National Women's Soccer League. Petrucelli is the second head coach of the Red Stars in the NWSL era after the scandal plagued exit of Rory Dames. In Petrucelli's first season in 2022, the team went 9–7–6, which was good enough for sixth in the standings and the last playoff spot. After scoring first in the tenth minute, the team lost 2–1 in the first round to expansion club San Diego Wave FC.

== Personal life ==
Petrucelli is a native of Orange, New Jersey, and graduated from the University of North Carolina at Greensboro in 1984 with a degree in business administration. He has three children with his wife Eve.
