= Paul Ratcliffe (soccer) =

English-born American soccer coach

- Ratcliffe with Stanford in 2026

Personal information
- Date of birth: 1969 (age 56–57)
- Place of birth: England

Team information
- Current team: Stanford (coach)

College career
Years	Team	Apps	(Gls)
1989–1992	UCLA		

Senior career*
Years	Team	Apps	(Gls)
1993	Los Angeles United		
1994	Anaheim Splash		

Managerial career
- 1998–2002: Saint Mary's
- 2003–: Stanford
- * Club domestic league appearances and goals

Paul Ratcliffe (born 1969) is an English-born American college soccer coach who is the head coach of the Stanford Cardinal women's soccer team. He led the Cardinal to the national championship in 2011, 2017, and 2019. He is a three-time NSCAA Coach of the Year, winning the award in 2008, 2009, and 2011.

== Coaching career ==
Ratcliffe was the head coach of Saint Mary's from 1998 until February 2003, when he was hired to coach Stanford. He won NSCAA Coach of the Year in 2008, 2009, and 2011. He led Stanford to national runners-up finishes in 2009 and 2010 before leading Stanford to a 2011, 2017, and 2019 National Championships.

== College head coaching record ==
Record table
Season	Team	Overall	Conference	Standing	Postseason
Saint Mary's (West Coast) (1998–2002)
1998	Saint Mary's	6–12–0			
1999	Saint Mary's	13–4–1			
2000	Saint Mary's	12–6–2			
2001	Saint Mary's	15–3–2			NCAA Second Round
2002	Saint Mary's	9–9–2			
Saint Mary's:		55–34–7 (.609)			
Stanford (Pac-12) (2003–present)
2003	Stanford	10–9–2	5–3–1	T–3rd	NCAA First Round
2004	Stanford	13–6–3	4–3–2	T–4th	NCAA Second Round
2005	Stanford	10–7–3	4–3–2	4th	NCAA First Round
2006	Stanford	15–6–2	6–2–1	3rd	NCAA Round of 16
2007	Stanford	15–3–5	5–1–3	T–3rd	NCAA Round of 16
2008	Stanford	22–2–1	8–1–0	2nd	NCAA Semifinals
2009	Stanford	25–1–0	9–0–0	1st	NCAA Runners-up
2010	Stanford	23–1–2	9–0–0	1st	NCAA Runners-up
2011	Stanford	25–0–1	11–0–0	1st	NCAA Champions
2012	Stanford	21–2–1	11–0–0	1st	NCAA Semifinals
2013	Stanford	15–6–1	6–5–0	4th	NCAA Round of 16
2014	Stanford	20–2–3	9–1–1	2nd	NCAA Semifinals
2015	Stanford	19–2–2	10–0–1	1st	NCAA Quarterfinals
2016	Stanford	18–2–1	10–1–0	1st	NCAA Second Round
2017	Stanford	24–1–0	11–0–0	1st	NCAA Champions
2018	Stanford	21–1–2	10–0–1	1st	NCAA College Cup Semifinals
2019	Stanford	24–1–0	11–0–0	1st	NCAA Champions
Stanford:		320–52–29 (.834)			
Total:		375–86–36 (.775)	139–20–12 (.848)		
National champion Postseason invitational champion Conference regular season champion Conference regular season and conference tournament champion Division regular season champion Division regular season and conference tournament champion Conference tournament champion

== See also ==
- List of college women's soccer career coaching wins leaders
