= United Soccer Coaches College Coach of the Year =

The United Soccer Coaches College Coach of the Year is an award given by the United Soccer Coaches (formerly National Soccer Coaches Association of America [NSCAA]) to one men's and one women's NCAA Division I collegiate coach each. The men's award began in 1973, and the women's award began in 1982.

The NSCAA was rebranded as United Soccer Coaches on August 2, 2017.

== Key ==
*	Denotes coaches inducted to the National Soccer Hall of Fame
Coach (#)	Denotes the number of times the coach has won the award at that point

== Winners ==
Year	Men's	College	Women's	College	Ref.
1973	Bob Guelker*	SIU Edwardsville	not awarded	—N/a	
1974	Jack MacKenzie	Quincy	not awarded	—N/a	
1975	Paul Reinhardt	Vermont	not awarded	—N/a	
1976	Jerry Yeagley*	Indiana	not awarded	—N/a	
1977	Klaas de Boer	Cleveland State	not awarded	—N/a	
1978	Cliff McCrath	Seattle Pacific	not awarded	—N/a	
1979	Walter Bahr*	Penn State	not awarded	—N/a	
1980	Jerry Yeagley* (2)	Indiana	not awarded	—N/a	
1981	Schellas Hyndman	Eastern Illinois	not awarded	—N/a	
1982	John Rennie	Duke	Anson Dorrance*	North Carolina	
1983	Dieter Ficken	Columbia	David Lombardo	Keene State	
1984	James Lennox	Hartwick	Philip Pincince	Brown	
1985	Peter Mehlert	American	Kalenkeni Banda	UMass	
1986	Steve Parker		Anson Dorrance* (2)	North Carolina	
1987	Anson Dorrance* (3)	North Carolina	Kalenkeni Banda (2)	UMass	
1988	Keith Tucker	Howard	Larry Gross	NC State	
1989	Steve Sampson	Santa Clara	Austin Daniels	Hartford	
1990	Bob Reasso	Rutgers	Lauren Gregg	Virginia	
1991	Mitch Murray	Santa Clara	Greg Ryan	Wisconsin	
1992	Charlie Slagle	Davidson	Bill Hempen	Duke	
1993	Bob Bradley	Princeton	Jac Cicala	George Mason	
1994	Jerry Yeagley* (3)	Indiana	Chris Petrucelli	Notre Dame	
1995	Jim Launder	Wisconsin	Chris Petrucelli (2)	Notre Dame	
1996	David Masur	St. John's	John Walker	Texas Tech	
1997	Sigi Schmid*	UCLA	Len Tsantiris	Connecticut	
1998	Jerry Yeagley* (4)	Indiana	Becky Burleigh	Florida	
1999	Jerry Yeagley* (5)	Indiana	Pat Farmer	Penn State	
2000	Ray Reid	Connecticut	Jill Ellis	UCLA	
2001	Elmar Bolowich	North Carolina	Jerry Smith	Santa Clara	
2002	Tom Fitzgerald	UCLA	Clive Charles	Portland	
2003	Jerry Yeagley* (6)	Indiana	Anson Dorrance* (4)	North Carolina	
2004	Tim Vom Steeg	UC Santa Barbara	Julie Shackford	Princeton	
2005	Sasho Cirovski	Maryland	Paula Wilkins	Penn State	
2006	Tim Vom Steeg (2)	UC Santa Barbara	Anson Dorrance* (5)	North Carolina	
2007	Jay Vidovich	Wake Forest	Ali Khosroshahin	USC	
2008	Jay Vidovich (2)	Wake Forest	Paul Ratcliffe	Stanford	
2009	Caleb Porter	Akron	Paul Ratcliffe (2)	Stanford	
2010	Ken Lolla	Louisville	Randy Waldrum	Notre Dame	
2011	Jeremy Gunn	Charlotte	Paul Ratcliffe (3)	Stanford	
2012	Brian Wiese	Georgetown	Erica Walsh	Penn State	
2013	Bobby Clark	Notre Dame	Steve Swanson	Virginia	
2014	Pete Carinigi	UMBC	Mark Krikorian	Florida State	
2015	Mike Noonan	Clemson	Erica Walsh (2)	Penn State	
2016	Jamie Franks	Denver	Dave Nolan	Georgetown	
2017	Jeremy Gunn (2)	Stanford	Robbie Church	Duke	
2018	Adam Cooper	Saint Mary's	Dave Nolan (2)	Georgetown	
2019	Brian Wiese (2)	Georgetown	Todd Shulenberger	Washington State	
2020	Chris Grassie	Marshall	Mark Krikorian (2)	Florida State	
2021	Mike Noonan	Clemson	Jennifer Rockwood	BYU	
2022	Ian McIntyre	Syracuse	Margueritte Aozasa	UCLA	
2023	Chad Riley	Notre Dame	Brian Pensky	Florida State	
2024	Brian Maisonneuve	Ohio State	Damon Nahas	North Carolina	
2025	Doug Allison	Furman	Brian Pensky	Florida State	
