= 2008 NCAA Division I women's soccer tournament =

2008 NCAA women's soccer tournament
Women's College Cup (semifinals & final)

Tournament details
- Country: United States
- Dates: November 14–December 7, 2008
- Teams: 64

Final positions
- Champions: North Carolina Tar Heels (19th title, 23rd College Cup)
- Runners-up: Notre Dame Fighting Irish (6th title match, 10th College Cup)
- Semifinalists: Stanford Cardinal (2nd College Cup); UCLA Bruins (6th College Cup)

Tournament statistics
- Matches played: 63
- Goals scored: 203 (3.22 per match)
- Attendance: 61,290 (973 per match)
- Top goal scorer(s): KayAnne Gummersall, DU; Kerri Hanks, ND; Casey Nogueira, UNC; McCall Zerboni, UCLA

Awards
- Best player: Offensive–Casey Nogueira (UNC); Defensive–Carrie Dew (ND)

The 2008 NCAA Division I women's soccer tournament (also known as the 2008 Women's College Cup) was the 27th annual single-elimination tournament to determine the national champion of NCAA Division I women's collegiate soccer. The semifinals and championship game were played at WakeMed Soccer Park in Cary, North Carolina from December 5–7, 2008 while the preceding rounds were played at various sites across the country from November 14–29.

North Carolina defeated Notre Dame in the final, 2–1, to win their nineteenth national title. This was a rematch of the 1994, 1996, 1999, and 2006 tournament finals, all won by the Tar Heels. The Tar Heels (25–1–2) were coached by Anson Dorrance.

The most outstanding offensive player was Casey Nogueira from North Carolina, and the most outstanding defensive player was Carrie Dew from Notre Dame. Nogueira and Dew, alongside nine other players, were named to the All-Tournament team.

The tournament's leading scorers were KayAnne Gummersall from Duke (4 goals, 1 assist), Kerri Hanks from Notre Dame (4 goals, 1 assist), Casey Nogueira from North Carolina (2 goals, 5 assists), and McCall Zerboni from UCLA (4 goals, 1 assist).

== Qualification ==
All Division I women's soccer programs were eligible to qualify for the tournament. The tournament field remained fixed at 64 teams.

== Format ==
Just as before, the final two rounds, deemed the Women's College Cup, were played at a pre-determined neutral site. All other rounds were played on campus sites at the home field of the higher-seeded team. The only exceptions were the first two rounds, which were played at regional campus sites. The top sixteen teams hosted four team-regionals on their home fields (with some exceptions, noted below) during the tournament's first weekend.

=== National seeds ===
| #1 Seeds | #2 Seeds | #3 Seeds | #4 Seeds |
|---|---|---|---|
| North Carolina (19–1–2); Notre Dame (21–0–0); Stanford (18–1–1); UCLA (18–0–2) | Florida (17–3–1); Florida State (14–2–3); Portland (17–1–0); Virginia (13–4–3) | Boston College (13–5–2); Duke (12–5–3); Texas A&M (15–4–1); Wake Forest (12–7–0) | Colorado (14–4–4); Missouri (15–5–1); Oklahoma State (17–1–3); USC (15–4–1) |

=== Teams ===
Notre Dame Regional
| Seed | School | Conference | Berth Type | Record |
|---|---|---|---|---|
| | Auburn | SEC | At-large | 11-8-2 |
| | Belmont | Atlantic Sun | Automatic | 13-6-3 |
| 3 | Boston College | ACC | At-large | 13-5-2 |
| | Central Conn. State | Northeast | Automatic | 12-6-4 |
| 4 | Colorado | Big 12 | At-large | 14-4-4 |
| 2 | Florida State | ACC | At-large | 14-2-3 |
| | Harvard | Ivy League | Auto (shared) | 10-3-4 |
| | Marquette | Big East | At-large | 11-7-3 |
| | Michigan State | Big Ten | At-large | 13-6-3 |
| | Milwaukee | Horizon | Automatic | 18-2-2 |
| | Minnesota | Big Ten | At-large | 20-3 |
| | MVSU | SWAC | Automatic | 09-10 |
| | Northeastern | CAA | Automatic | 13-8-1 |
| 1 | Notre Dame | Big East | Automatic | 21-0 |
| | South Dakota State | Summit | Automatic | 14-4-1 |
| | Toledo | MAC | Automatic | 16-4-1 |

UCLA Regional
| Seed | School | Conference | Berth Type | Record |
|---|---|---|---|---|
| | Army | Patriot | Automatic | 12-5-3 |
| | Boston U. | America East | Automatic | 15-5-1 |
| | BYU | Mountain West | Automatic | 17-5 |
| 3 | Duke | ACC | At-large | 12-5-3 |
| | Fresno State | WAC | Automatic | 11-8-2 |
| | Long Beach State | Big West | At-large | 14-3-4 |
| | Princeton | Ivy League | Auto (shared) | 12-2-2 |
| | Radford | Big South | Automatic | 14-1-6 |
| | San Diego | West Coast | At-large | 14-4-2 |
| | South Carolina | SEC | At-large | 11-6-4 |
| 1 | UCLA | Pac-12 | Automatic | 18-0-2 |
| 4 | USC | Pac-10 | At-large | 15-4-1 |
| 2 | Virginia | ACC | At-large | 13-4-3 |
| | Virginia Tech | ACC | At-large | 10-8-4 |
| | West Virginia | Big East | At-large | 13-2-6 |
| | William & Mary | CAA | At-large | 14-5-1 |

Stanford Regional
| Seed | School | Conference | Berth Type | Record |
|---|---|---|---|---|
| | Denver | Sun Belt | Automatic | 19-2-2 |
| | Fairfield | MAAC | Automatic | 15-4-3 |
| | Georgia | SEC | At-large | 11-10-1 |
| | James Madison | CAA | At-large | 12-6-2 |
| | Kansas | Big 12 | At-large | 12-7-2 |
| | Morehead State | Ohio Valley | Automatic | 10-8-2 |
| | Northern Arizona | Big Sky | Automatic | 12-6-3 |
| 4 | Oklahoma State | Big 12 | At-large | 17-1-3 |
| | Penn State | Big Ten | Automatic | 16-7 |
| 2 | Portland | West Coast | Automatic | 17-1 |
| | Rutgers | Big East | At-large | 12-6-1 |
| 1 | Stanford | Pac-10 | At-large | 18-1-1 |
| | Texas | Big 12 | At-large | 12-3-4 |
| | UC Santa Barbara | Big West | Automatic | 12-6-3 |
| 3 | Wake Forest | ACC | At-large | 12-7 |
| | Washington State | Pac-10 | At-large | 10-5-5 |

North Carolina Regional
| Seed | School | Conference | Berth Type | Record |
|---|---|---|---|---|
| | California | Pac-10 | At-large | 10-8-1 |
| | Charlotte | Atlantic 10 | Automatic | 17-3-1 |
| | Evansville | Missouri Valley | Automatic | 13-4-2 |
| 2 | Florida | SEC | At-large | 17-3-1 |
| | Illinois | Big Ten | At-large | 11-8-1 |
| | LSU | SEC | At-large | 14-3-2 |
| | Memphis | Conference USA | Automatic | 15-4-2 |
| | Miami (FL) | ACC | At-large | 10-8-3 |
| 4 | Missouri | Big 12 | Automatic | 15-5-1 |
| 1 | North Carolina | ACC | Automatic | 19-1-2 |
| | Tennessee | SEC | Automatic | 10-10-2 |
| 3 | Texas A&M | Big 12 | At-large | 15-4-1 |
| | Texas State | Southland | Automatic | 12-4-4 |
| | UCF | Conference USA | At-large | 13-5-3 |
| | Washington | Pac-10 | At-large | 14-5-1 |
| | Western Carolina | Southern | Automatic | 13-7-1 |

== Bracket ==
=== Notre Dame Bracket ===
First round November 14–15; Regional Campus Sites
1 | Notre Dame | 5
Toledo | 2
Alumni Field • Notre Dame, IN
Michigan State | 2
Milwaukee | 1
Minnesota | 2
Marquette | 1
Robbie Stadium • St. Paul, MN
South Dakota State | 1
4 | Colorado | 0
3 | Boston College | 3
Central Connecticut | 0
Newton Soccer Complex • Newton, MA
Northeastern | 2(4)
Harvard | 2(2)
Auburn | 2
Belmont | 0
AU Soccer Complex • Auburn, AL
Mississippi Valley State | 0
2 | Florida State | 7

Second round November 15–16; Regional Campus Sites
1 | Notre Dame | 1
Michigan State | 0
Minnesota | 2
South Dakota State | 0
3 | Boston College | 4
Northeastern | 0
Auburn | 0
2 | Florida State | 1

Round of 16; November 21–23; Campus Sites
1 | Notre Dame* | 1
Minnesota | 0
3 | Boston College | 0
2 | Florida State* | 1

Quarterfinals; November 28–29; Campus Sites
1 | Notre Dame* | 2
2 | Florida State | 0

=== Stanford Bracket ===
First round November 14–15; Regional Campus Sites
2 | Portland | 1
Northern Arizona | 0
Merlo Field • Portland, OR
Washington State | 0
Texas | 1
Georgia | 0
James Madison | 1
Spry Stadium • Winston-Salem, NC
Morehead State | 0
3 | Wake Forest | 2
4 | Oklahoma State | 1
Fairfield | 0
Yurcak Field • Piscataway, NJ
Rutgers | 2
Penn State | 1
Kansas | 2
Denver | 1
Maloney Field at Laird Q. Cagan Stadium • Stanford, CA
UC Santa Barbara | 0
1 | Stanford | 2

Second round November 15–16; Regional Campus Sites
2 | Portland | 2
Texas | 0
James Madison | 1
3 | Wake Forest | 0
4 | Oklahoma State | 0(2)
Rutgers | 0(4)
Kansas | 0
1 | Stanford | 5

Round of 16; November 21–23; Campus Sites
2 | Portland* | 3
James Madison | 2
Rutgers | 0
1 | Stanford* | 1

Quarterfinals; November 28–29; Campus Sites
2 | Portland | 0
1 | Stanford* | 1

=== UCLA Bracket ===
First round November 14–15; Regional Campus Sites
1 | UCLA | 5
Fresno State | 0
Drake Stadium • Los Angeles, CA
San Diego | 1
Long Beach State | 0
Virginia Tech | 0
BYU | 2
South Stadium • Provo, UT
Boston University | 0
4 | USC | 2
3 | Duke | 5
Radford | 1
Koskinen Stadium • Durham, NC
William & Mary | 3^{OT}
South Carolina | 2
West Virginia | 2
Princeton | 0
Klöckner Stadium • Charlottesville, VA
Army | 0
2 | Virginia | 2

Second round November 15–16; Regional Campus Sites
1 | UCLA | 1
San Diego | 0
2 | BYU | 1(2)
4 | USC | 1(3)
3 | Duke | 1
William & Mary | 0
West Virginia | 2
2 | Virginia | 3

Round of 16; November 21–23; Campus Sites
1 | UCLA* | 1
4 | USC | 0
3 | Duke | 2
2 | Virginia* | 0

Quarterfinals; November 28–29; Campus Sites
1 | UCLA* | 6
3 | Duke | 1

=== North Carolina Bracket ===
First round November 14–15; Regional Campus Sites
2 | Florida | 2
California | 1
Pressly Stadium • Gainesville, FL
UCF | 3
Miami (FL) | 1
LSU | 2
Washington | 3
Aggie Soccer Complex • College Station, TX
Texas State | 2
3 | Texas A&M | 5
4 | Missouri | 2
Evansville | 0
Walton Stadium • Columbia, MO
Memphis | 0
Illinois | 1
UNC Charlotte | 2
Tennessee | 0
Fetzer Field • Chapel Hill, NC
Western Carolina | 0
1 | North Carolina | 2

Second round November 15–16; Regional Campus Sites
2 | Florida | 2
UCF | 0
Washington | 1
3 | Texas A&M | 3
4 | Missouri | 1(3)
Illinois | 1(4)
UNC Charlotte | 0
1 | North Carolina | 4

Round of 16; November 21–23; Campus Sites
2 | Florida* | 1
3 | Texas A&M | 2
Illinois | 0
1 | North Carolina* | 3

Quarterfinals; November 28–29; Campus Sites
3 | Texas A&M | 1
1 | North Carolina* (2OT) | 2

=== College Cup ===
Semifinals; December 5 WakeMed Soccer Park; Cary, North Carolina
1 | Notre Dame | 1
1 | Stanford | 0
1 | UCLA | 0
1 | North Carolina | 1

Championship; December 7 WakeMed Soccer Park; Cary, North Carolina
1 | Notre Dame | 1
1 | North Carolina | 2

== All-tournament team ==
- Casey Nogueira, North Carolina (most outstanding offensive player)
- Carrie Dew, Notre Dame (most outstanding defensive player)
- Lauren Cheney, UCLA
- Yael Averbuch, North Carolina
- Brittani Bartok, North Carolina
- Whitney Engen, North Carolina
- Tobin Heath, North Carolina
- Courtney Barg, Notre Dame
- Kerri Hanks, Notre Dame
- Kelsey Lysander, Notre Dame
- Christen Press, Stanford

== See also ==
- NCAA Women's Soccer Championships (Division II, Division III)
- NCAA Men's Soccer Championships (Division I, Division II, Division III)
