= 2007 Big 12 Conference women's soccer tournament =

Collegiate women's soccer tournament

- Classification: Division I
- Teams: 8
- Matches: 7
- Attendance: 8,243
- Site: Blossom Athletic Center; San Antonio, TX
- Champions: Texas (2nd title)
- Winning coach: Chris Petrucelli (2nd title)

2007 Big 12 Conference women's soccer standings
	Conf.						Overall
Team	W		L		T	PCT	W		L		T	PCT
No. 13 Texas A&M ‍†‍‍^{y}	9	–	1	–	0	.900	18	–	4	–	2	.792
No. 11 Texas ‍‍‡‍^{y}	6	–	2	–	2	.700	16	–	4	–	5	.740
Kansas ‍‍‍	5	–	2	–	3	.650	7	–	10	–	4	.429
No. 25 Missouri ‍‍‍^{y}	6	–	4	–	0	.600	13	–	8	–	1	.614
Texas Tech ‍‍‍	5	–	4	–	1	.550	7	–	8	–	2	.471
No. 23 Oklahoma State ‍‍‍^{y}	5	–	4	–	1	.550	14	–	6	–	3	.674
Colorado ‍‍‍^{y}	5	–	5	–	0	.500	10	–	8	–	4	.545
Iowa State ‍‍‍	4	–	4	–	2	.500	8	–	6	–	5	.553
Oklahoma ‍‍‍	2	–	7	–	1	.250	6	–	10	–	3	.395
Baylor ‍‍‍	1	–	8	–	1	.150	7	–	10	–	2	.421
Nebraska ‍‍‍	1	–	8	–	1	.150	5	–	10	–	4	.368
† – Conference champion ‡ – Tournament champion y – Invited to the NCAA tournament Rankings from NSCAA Coaches

The 2007 Big 12 Conference women's soccer tournament was the postseason women's soccer tournament for the Big 12 Conference held from November 7 to 11, 2007. The 7-match tournament was held at the Blossom Athletic Center in San Antonio, TX with a combined attendance of 8,243. The 8-team single-elimination tournament consisted of three rounds based on seeding from regular season conference play. The Texas Longhorns defeated the Texas A&M Aggies in the championship match to win their 2nd conference tournament.

== Regular season standings ==
Place	Seed	Team	Conference					Overall			
Place	Seed	Team	W	L	T	%	Pts	W	L	T	%
1	1	Texas A&M	9	1	0	.900	27	18	4	2	.792
2	2	Texas	6	2	2	.700	20	16	4	5	.740
3	3	Kansas	5	2	3	.650	18	7	10	4	.429
3	4	Missouri	6	4	0	.600	18	13	8	1	.614
5	5	Texas Tech	5	4	1	.550	16	7	8	2	.471
5	6	Oklahoma State	5	4	1	.550	16	14	6	3	.674
7	7	Colorado	5	5	0	.500	15	10	8	4	.545
8	8	Iowa State	4	4	2	.500	14	8	6	5	.553
9		Oklahoma	2	7	1	.250	7	6	10	3	.395
10		Baylor	1	8	1	.150	4	7	10	2	.421
10		Nebraska	1	8	1	.150	4	5	10	4	.368

== Bracket ==
Quarterfinals; Wednesday, Nov 7
1	Texas A&M	1 (8)
8	Iowa State	1 (7)
4	Missouri	4^{2OT}
5	Texas Tech	3^{2OT}
2	Texas	0 (4)
7	Colorado	0 (2)
3	Kansas	0
6	Oklahoma State	3

Semifinals; Friday, Nov 9
1	Texas A&M	4
4	Missouri	1
2	Texas	1 (5)
6	Oklahoma State	1 (3)

Final; Sunday, Nov 11
1	Texas A&M	1
2	Texas	2

== Awards ==
=== Most valuable player ===
- Offensive MVP – Dianna Pfenninger – Texas
- Defensive MVP – Kasey Moore – Texas

=== All-Tournament team ===
Position	Player	Team
GK	Dianna Pfenninger	Texas
D	Kasey Moore	Texas
D	Amy Berand	Texas A&M
D	Brittany Harrison	Texas Tech
MF	Yolanda Odenyo	Oklahoma State
MF	Kristin Andrighetto	Missouri
MF	Michelle Collins	Missouri
F	Elisabeth Jones	Texas A&M
F	Ashlee Pistorius	Texas A&M
F	Kelsey Carpenter	Texas
