= Walton Stadium =

Walton Stadium may refer to:

- Audrey J. Walton Stadium (Columbia, Missouri), field of the Missouri Tigers track and field team
- Joe Walton Stadium, field of the Robert Morris University Colonials football team
- Audrey J. Walton Stadium (Central Missouri) field of the University of Central Missouri football team
