= Audrey J. Walton Stadium =

Audrey J. Walton Stadium may refer to:

- Audrey J. Walton Stadium (Central Missouri), University of Central Missouri Mules football stadium
- Audrey J. Walton Stadium (Columbia, Missouri), University of Missouri Tigers track and field and soccer stadium
