= Ali Khosroshahin =

American soccer coach

Personal information
- Date of birth: February 26, 1970 (age 56)

College career
| Years | Team | Apps | (Gls) |
| 1989–1990 | Cal State Fullerton | | |
| 1991–1992 | Cal State Los Angeles | | |

Senior career*
| Years | Team | Apps | (Gls) |
| 1995–1996 | Standard Falcons | | |
| 1997 | Valley Eagles | | |

Managerial career
- 2001–2006: Cal State Fullerton Titans
- 2006: San Fernando Valley Quakes
- 2007–2013: USC Trojans
- 2016: LA Laguna FC
- 2018: Santa Clarita Blue Heat (technical advisor)
- * Club domestic league appearances and goals

Ali Khosroshahin (born February 26, 1970) is an American former college soccer coach. He was the head coach of Cal State Fullerton Titans women's soccer and USC Trojans women's soccer. He led USC to the 2007 national championship, and was named the 2007 NSCAA Coach of the Year.

In June 2019, Khosroshahin pleaded guilty to conspiracy to commit racketeering in connection with the 2019 college admissions bribery scandal.

== Coaching career ==
Khosroshahin coached Cal State Fullerton Titans women's soccer from 2001 to 2006. He was named Big West Conference Coach of the Year in 2001, 2005, and 2006.

Khosroshahin coached San Fernando Valley Quakes in 2006.

On December 26, 2006, he was hired by USC Trojans women's soccer.

He led USC to the 2007 national championship, and was named the 2007 NSCAA Coach of the Year.

USC fired Khosroshahin on November 8, 2013.

Khosroshahin coached LA Laguna FC in 2016.

In 2018, Khosroshahin joined Santa Clarita Blue Heat as a technical advisor.

== College admissions bribery scandal ==
In June 2019, Khosroshahin pleaded guilty to conspiracy to commit racketeering in connection with the 2019 college admissions bribery scandal. He and USC assistant coach, Laura Janke, received bribes in exchange for facilitate college admission of students using false soccer recruit information.

In June 2022, he was sentenced to time served, six months of home confinement, one year of supervised release, and ordered to pay forfeiture of $208,990. Khosroshahin helped in prosecuting others in the case, including testifying at the trial of USC water polo coach Jovan Vavic.

== Personal life ==
Khosroshahin is Iranian-American.

== Honors ==
Cal State Fullerton Titans

- Big West Conference women's soccer tournament: 2005, 2006

USC Trojans

- NCAA Division I women's soccer tournament: 2007

Individual

- Big West Conference Coach of the Year: 2001, 2005, 2006
- NSCAA Coach of the Year: 2007

== See also ==
- 2019 college admissions bribery scandal
