= Radford Highlanders women's soccer =

American college soccer team

- 2016 Radford Highlanders women's soccer team
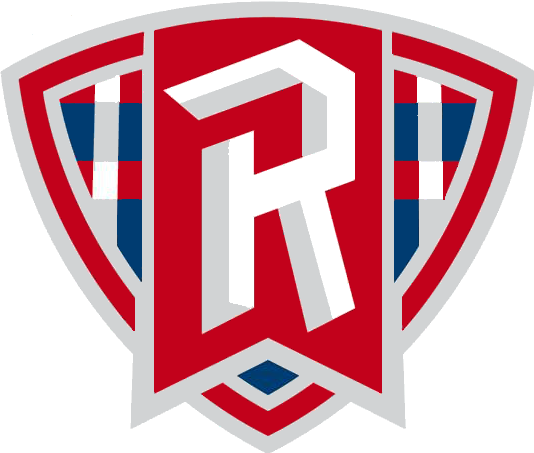
- Founded: 1981
- University: Radford University
- Head coach: Ben Soharabi (28th season)
- Conference: Big South; North Division
- Location: Radford, Virginia, US
- Stadium: Patrick D. Cupp Memorial Stadium (capacity: 5,000)
- Nickname: Highlanders
- Colors: Red, gray, and white

NCAA tournament appearances
- 1985, 1998, 2002, 2008, 2011, 2012, 2018, 2019

Conference tournament championships
- 1998, 2002, 2008, 2011, 2012

Conference regular season championships
- 1999, 2001, 2011

The Radford Highlanders women's soccer team is an intercollegiate varsity sports team of Radford University. The team is a member of the Big South Conference of the National Collegiate Athletic Association.

== Radford in the NCAA Tournament ==
Year	Round	Opponent	Result
1985	First Round	NC State	L 0-1
1998	First Round	James Madison	L 0-4
2002	First Round	#2 North Carolina	L 1-6
2008	First Round	#3 Duke	L 1-5
2011	First Round	#1 Duke	L 0-5
2012	First Round	#2 North Carolina	L 0-2
2018	First Round	#2 West Virginia	L 0-6
2019	First Round	#1 Virginia	L 0-3

== Team management ==
Current Coaching Staff

Position	Staff
Head Coach	(United States) Ben Soharabi
Asst. Coach	(United States) Davis Fox

Last updated: June 18, 2024

== Accomplishments ==
Highlander players hold a number of Big South records, most notably for the current goalie Che' Brown (2010–present) who holds the records for goals against average (0.65), saves percentage (.874) and highest winning percentage (.726). Sue Williams (1992) holds the record for most assists per game (1.00).
