= 2011 NCAA Division I women's soccer tournament =

2011 NCAA women's soccer tournament
Women's College Cup

Tournament details
- Country: United States
- Dates: November 11–December 4, 2011
- Teams: 64

Final positions
- Champions: Stanford Cardinal (1st title, 5th College Cup)
- Runners-up: Duke Blue Devils (1st title match, 2nd College Cup)
- Semifinalists: Florida State Seminoles (5th College Cup); Wake Forest Demon Deacons (1st College Cup)

Tournament statistics
- Matches played: 63
- Goals scored: 186 (2.95 per match)
- Attendance: 62,437 (991 per match)
- Top goal scorer(s): Katie Stengel, WFU (5)

Awards
- Best player: Offensive–Teresa Noyola (Stanford); Defensive–Emily Oliver (Stanford)

The 2011 NCAA Division I women's soccer tournament (also known as the 2011 Women's College Cup) was the 30th annual single-elimination tournament to determine the national champion of NCAA Division I women's collegiate soccer. The semifinals and championship game were played at Kennesaw State University Soccer Stadium (now known as Fifth Third Bank Stadium) in Kennesaw, Georgia from December 2–4, 2011 while the preceding rounds were played at various sites across the country from November 11–27.

Stanford defeated Duke in the final, 1–0, to win their first national title. Stanford had lost the final match of the previous two Women's College Cup tournaments. The undefeated Cardinal (25–0–1) were coached by Paul Ratcliffe. They were the first team to finish the season without a loss since North Carolina in 2003.

The most outstanding offensive player was Teresa Noyola from Stanford, and the most outstanding defensive player was Emily Oliver, also from Stanford. Noyola and Oliver, alongside nine other players, were named to the All-Tournament team.

The tournament's leading scorer, with 5 goals and 3 assists, was Katie Stengel from Wake Forest.

== Qualification ==
All Division I women's soccer programs were eligible to qualify for the tournament. The tournament field remained fixed at 64 teams.

== Format ==
Just as before, the final two rounds, deemed the Women's College Cup, were played at a pre-determined neutral site. All other rounds were played on campus sites at the home field of the higher-seeded team although with a few exceptions. The first round was played exclusively on the home fields of higher-seeded teams (noted with an asterisk below). However, the second and third rounds were played on the home fields of the home fields of the two remaining teams in each bracket with the highest seed (generally the #1 and #2 seed in each bracket with a few noted exceptions). Those teams are also noted with asterisk. Finally, the quarterfinal round, or the championship match for each bracket, was played on the home field of the higher-seeded team, with no exceptions.

=== National seeds ===
#1 Seeds	#2 Seeds	#3 Seeds	#4 Seeds
Duke (17–3–1); Florida State (14–6–1); Stanford (19–0–1); Wake Forest (14–3–4)	Florida (16–7–0); Oklahoma State (19–1–2); UCLA (15–1–3); Virginia (14–4–2)	Auburn (14–6–2); North Carolina (11–5–1); Pepperdine (15–1–4); Texas A&M (15–5–2)	Boston College (11–5–2); Memphis (21–0–2); Penn State (19–4–0); Tennessee (15–6–0)

=== Teams ===
Stanford Regional
Seed	School	Conference	Berth Type	Record
	Ark.-Pine Bluff	SWAC	Automatic	16-4-1
3	Auburn	SEC	Automatic	14-6-2
4	Boston College	ACC	At-large	11-5-2
	California	Pac-12	At-large	12-6-2
	Illinois	Big Ten	Automatic	16-4-2
	La Salle	Atlantic 10	At-large	15-1-3
	Marist	MAAC	Automatic	13-5-2
	Maryland	ACC	At-large	10-5-4
	Montana	Big Sky	Automatic	06-11-4
	Notre Dame	Big East	At-large	10-7-3
2	Oklahoma State	Big 12	At-large	19-1-2
	Santa Clara	West Coast	At-large	13-2-5
	South Carolina	SEC	At-large	15-6
1	Stanford	Pac-12	Automatic	19-0-1
	Texas	Big 12	At-large	11-8-1
	Utah State	WAC	Automatic	15-4-2

Wake Forest Regional
Seed	School	Conference	Berth Type	Record
	Army	Patriot	Automatic	12-3-5
	Baylor	Big 12	At-large	14-3-3
	Boston U.	America East	Automatic	18-2-1
	FIU	Sun Belt	Automatic	13-6-3
2	Florida	SEC	At-large	16-7
	Florida Gulf Coast	Atlantic Sun	Automatic	14-4-2
	Harvard	Ivy League	Automatic	12-4-1
	Marquette	Big East	At-large	17-3
3	North Carolina	ACC	At-large	11-5-1
	Oakland	Summit	Automatic	10-10-1
4	Penn State	Big Ten	At-large	19-4
	Texas State	Southland	Automatic	14-5-1
	Toledo	MAC	Automatic	14-6-2
	UCF	Conference USA	At-large	11-4-5
1	Wake Forest	ACC	At-large	14-3-4
	William & Mary	CAA	Automatic	17-2-2

Florida State Regional
Seed	School	Conference	Berth Type	Record
	Dayton	Atlantic 10	Automatic	19-3
1	Florida State	ACC	Automatic	14-6-1
	Kentucky	SEC	At-large	13-7
	LIU Brooklyn	Northeast	Automatic	12-7-1
	Louisville	Big East	At-large	12-6-3
	LSU	SEC	At-large	13-7-1
4	Memphis	Conference USA	Automatic	21-0-1
	Oregon State	Pac-12	At-large	13-5-2
	Portland	West Coast	At-large	09-9-1
	Samford	Southern	Automatic	14-5-2
3	Texas A&M	Big 12	Automatic	15-5-2
	UT Martin	Ohio Valley	Automatic	14-6-2
2	Virginia	ACC	At-large	14-4-2
	Virginia Tech	ACC	At-large	12-7-1
	Washington State	Pac-12	At-large	12-6-3
	West Virginia	Big East	Automatic	17-4

Duke Regional
Seed	School	Conference	Berth Type	Record
	Alabama	SEC	At-large	10-8-3
1	Duke	ACC	At-large	17-3-1
	Georgia	SEC	At-large	12-6-2
	Illinois State	Missouri Valley	Automatic	13-5
	Kansas	Big 12	At-large	11-8-1
	Long Beach State	Big West	Automatic	15-5-1
	Miami (FL)	ACC	At-large	09-7-1
	Milwaukee	Horizon	Automatic	18-2
	New Mexico	Mountain West	Automatic	12-4-4
	Ohio State	Big Ten	At-large	10-8-2
3	Pepperdine	West Coast	Auto (shared)	15-1-4
	Radford	Big South	Automatic	15-5-1
	San Diego	West Coast	Auto (shared)	12-7
4	Tennessee	SEC	At-large	15-6
	UC Irvine	Big West	At-large	14-4-2
2	UCLA	Pac-12	At-large	15-1-3

== Bracket ==
=== Stanford Bracket ===
First round November 11–13; Campus Sites
1	Stanford*	3
Montana	0
Texas	0
South Carolina*	1
Santa Clara*	1(3)
California (2OT, PK)	1(4)
Marist	1
4	Boston College*	6
3	Auburn*	2
Utah State	1
La Salle	1
Maryland*	5
Notre Dame	0
Illinois*	1
Arkansas–Pine Bluff	1
2	Oklahoma State*	9

Second round November 18; Regional Campus Sites
1	Stanford*	2
South Carolina	0
California	0(1)
4	Boston College (2OT, PK)	0(3)
3	Auburn	0
Maryland	1
Illinois	0
2	Oklahoma State*	1

Round of 16; November 20; Regional Campus Sites
1	Stanford*	2
4	Boston College	0
Maryland	0
2	Oklahoma State*	1

Quarterfinals; November 25–27; Campus Sites
1	Stanford*	2
2	Oklahoma State	1

=== Florida State Bracket ===
First round November 11–13; Campus Sites
2	Virginia*	2
Long Island–Brooklyn	0
Washington State (2OT, PK)	1(4)
Kentucky*	1(2)
West Virginia*	0
Virginia Tech	1
LSU	0
3	Texas A&M*	4
4	Memphis*	7
Tennessee–Martin	0
Dayton	0
Louisville*	2
Oregon State*	1(6)
Portland (2OT, PK)	1(7)
Samford	0
1	Florida State*	2

Second round November 18; Regional Campus Sites
2	Virginia*	3
Washington State	0
Virginia Tech	3
3	Texas A&M	1
4	Memphis*	0
Louisville	3
Portland	1
1	Florida State	3

Round of 16; November 20; Regional Campus Sites
2	Virginia*	4
Virginia Tech	0
Louisville	0
1	Florida State	2

Quarterfinals; November 25–27; Campus Sites
2	Virginia	0
1	Florida State*	3

=== Wake Forest Bracket ===
First round November 11–13; Campus Sites
1	Wake Forest*	2
Oakland	0
Harvard	0
Boston University*	3
Marquette*	1
Toledo	0
Army	0
4	Penn State*	1
3	North Carolina*	4
William & Mary	1
Texas State	0
Baylor*	3
UCF*	2
FIU	0
Florida Gulf Coast	0
2	Florida*	3

Second round November 18; Regional Campus Sites
1	Wake Forest*	2
Boston University	0
Marquette	1
4	Penn State	4
3	North Carolina	5
Baylor	0
UCF	3
2	Florida*	2

Round of 16; November 20; Regional Campus Sites
1	Wake Forest*	4
Penn State	2
3	North Carolina	1(4)
UCF (2OT, PK)	1(5)

Quarterfinals; November 25–27; Campus Sites
1	Wake Forest*	3
UCF	0

=== Duke Bracket ===
First round November 11–13; Campus Sites
2	UCLA*	1
New Mexico	0
San Diego (2OT, PK)	2(5)
UC Irvine*	2(3)
Miami (FL)*	3
Alabama	2
Long Beach State	1
3	Pepperdine*	0
4	Tennessee*	0
Ohio State	3
Illinois State	0
Milwaukee*	3
Georgia	2
Kansas*	0
Radford	0
1	Duke*	5

Second round November 18; Campus Sites
2	UCLA*	1(2)
San Diego (2OT, PK)	1(3)
Miami (FL)	0
Long Beach State	1
Ohio State	2
Milwaukee	1
Georgia	1
1	Duke*	3

Round of 16; November 20; Campus Sites
San Diego	0
Long Beach State	1
Ohio State	1
1	Duke*	2

Quarterfinals; November 25–27; Campus Sites
Long Beach State	0
1	Duke*	2

=== College Cup ===
Semifinals; December 2 KSU Soccer Stadium; Kennesaw, Georgia
1	Stanford	3
1	Florida State	0
1	Wake Forest	1
1	Duke	4

Championship; December 4 KSU Soccer Stadium; Kennesaw, Georgia
1	Stanford	1
1	Duke	0

== All-tournament team ==
- (Mexico) Teresa Noyola, Stanford (most outstanding offensive player)
- Emily Oliver, Stanford (most outstanding defensive player)
- Alina Garciamendez, Stanford
- Tori Huster, Florida State
- Kaitlyn Kerr, Duke
- Camille Levin, Stanford
- Nicole Lipp, Duke
- Kristen Meier, Wake Forest
- Mollie Pathman, Duke
- Chioma Ubogagu, Stanford
- Kristy Zermuhlen, Stanford

== See also ==
- NCAA Women's Soccer Championships (Division II, Division III)
- NCAA Men's Soccer Championships (Division I, Division II, Division III)
