= Margueritte Bates =

American soccer coach

Margueritte Aozasa
Personal information
- Date of birth: May 17, 1990 (age 36)
- Place of birth: Piscataway, New Jersey, United States
- Positions: Defender; midfielder

Team information
- Current team: Texas (head coach)

College career
Years	Team	Apps	(Gls)
2008–2011	Santa Clara	77	(5)

International career
2006	United States U16		

Managerial career
- 2015–2021: Stanford (assistant)
- 2022–2025: UCLA
- 2023: United States U23
- 2026–present: Texas

Margueritte Aozasa (born May 17, 1990) is an American college soccer coach who is the current head coach of the Texas Longhorns women's soccer team. She previously served as the head coach of the UCLA Bruins women's soccer team, where she led UCLA to the 2022 national championship and was named the 2022 United Soccer Coaches College Coach of the Year.

== Early life ==
Aozasa was born in Piscataway, New Jersey, and was raised in Mountain View, California. She attended Los Altos High School.

== Playing career ==
Aozasa played college soccer at Santa Clara from 2008 to 2011.

Aozasa represented the United States under-16 team in 2006.

== Coaching career ==
After serving as an assistant coach at Stanford, Aozasa was hired as the head coach at UCLA on December 29, 2021. She led UCLA to the 2022 national championship, and was named the United Soccer Coaches College Coach of the Year. Following the 2022 season, Aozasa signed a contract extension with UCLA.

In 2023, Aozasa coached the United States under-23 team.

== Personal life ==
She married her husband Mykell Bates in December 2021.

In 2022, Aozasa became the first Asian American woman coach to win the NCAA Division I women's soccer tournament.

== Honors ==
UCLA Bruins

- NCAA Division I women's soccer tournament: 2022
- Pac-12 Championship: 2023

Individual

- United Soccer Coaches College Coach of the Year: 2022

== College head coaching record ==
Record table
Season	Team	Overall	Conference	Standing	Postseason
UCLA Bruins (Pac-12) (2022–2023)
2022	UCLA	22–2–1	9–2–0	2nd	NCAA Championship
2023	UCLA	16–2–1	10–0–1	1st	NCAA First Round
UCLA Bruins (Big Ten) (2024–2025)
2024	UCLA	17–4–3	8–1–2	2nd	NCAA Second Round
2025	UCLA	12–5–4	6–2–3	3rd	NCAA Second Round
UCLA:		67–13–9 (.803)			
Texas Longhorns (SEC) (2026–present)
2026	Texas	0–0–0	0–0–0		
Texas:		0–0–0 (–)			
Total:		67–13–9 (.803)			
National champion Postseason invitational champion Conference regular season champion Conference regular season and conference tournament champion Division regular season champion Division regular season and conference tournament champion Conference tournament champion
