= California Golden Bears women's soccer =

American college soccer team

- 2025 California Golden Bears women's soccer team
- Founded: 1982; 44 years ago
- University: University of California, Berkeley
- Head coach: Neil McGuire (20th season)
- Conference: ACC
- Location: Berkeley, California, US
- Stadium: Edwards Stadium (capacity: 22,000)
- Nickname: Golden Bears
- Colors: Blue and gold
Home	Away

NCAA tournament College Cup
- 1984, 1987, 1988

NCAA tournament Quarterfinals
- 1983, 1984, 1986, 1987, 1988

NCAA tournament Round of 16
- 1983, 1984, 1986, 1987, 1988, 1993, 2005,

NCAA tournament appearances
- 1983, 1984, 1986, 1987, 1988, 1993, 1998, 1999, 2000, 2001, 2002, 2004, 2005, 2006, 2007, 2008, 2009, 2010, 2011, 2012, 2013, 2014, 2015, 2016, 2017, 2019, 2022, 2024

Conference regular season championships
- 1998

The California Golden Bears women's soccer team who is representing University of California, Berkeley as they are in the Atlantic Coast Conference (ACC) in NCAA Division I women's college soccer. The team has never won the ACC regular season championship, but has shared the Pac-12 Conference championship once. The team has advanced to the NCAA Women's soccer tournament 28 times, including three College Cup appearances.

== History ==
=== 1980s ===
The program began play in 1982 with an undefeated season. The Bears went 6–0–0, but were not invited to the inaugural NCAA Tournament. Bill Merrell took over the team in 1983 and they finished 10–2–3 and advanced to the Quarterfinals of the NCAA Tournament. The team bettered its NCAA result as the Golden Bears reached the Semifinals in 1984, but lost the third place match against Massachusetts. After a season of not qualifying for the tournament in 1985, Merrell was replaced by Peter Reynaud. Reynaud would only coach for one season, where the Golden Bears went 16–3–1, and reached the Quarterfinals of the NCAA Tournament. Jean-Paul Verhees coached the team in 1987 and 1988, to great success. The Golden Bears posted a 16–1–0 record in 1987 and a 16–5–2 record in 1988. In both years, they reached the Semifinals of the NCAA Tournament. They only loss in 1987 was to National Champion, North Carolina in the Semifinals of the NCAA Tournament. Bill Merrill took back over the team in 1989 to close the decade. The Golden Bears finished 14–3–1, but did not qualify for the NCAA Tournament.

=== 1990s ===
Bill Merrell's last season coaching the Golden Bears was 1990, where the team finished 11–6–2 and was not invited to the NCAA Tournament. Andy Bonchonsky took over the team in 1991 and was the head coach for six seasons. Bonchonsky's tenure yielded lower win totals and only one NCAA qualification: a first round exit in 1993. The Golden Bears had double-digit win totals in every year except 1982 until 1991. From 1991 to 1996, they only had two seasons with at least ten wins, 1993 and 1996. They set a program record for lowest wins, at five, in 1994. In 1995, the Golden Bears began league play in the Pac-12 Conference, which was then known as the Pac-10. They finished their first season 3–4 in conference play. 1996 was a high mark for Bonchonsky, when the team finished 13–3–2 and 5–2–0 in conference play to finish in second place. However, that was not enough to prevent a coaching change, as Kevin Boyd took over in 1997. Boyd went 11–7–1 in his first season and 6–3–0 in conference play to finish in fourth place. The Golden Bears had thirteen wins in both 1998 and 1999, and broke a four-year drought of qualifying for the NCAA tournament in 1998. However, they were unable to advance past the First Round. 1998 was the only time that the Golden Bears won a conference regular season title, when they finished with a share of the Pac-10 title.

=== 2000s ===
The decade started out with a bang, as the Golden Bears set a program record for wins in 2000 with seventeen. They tied their best conference record at the time with a 7–2–0 finish, and finished second in the conference. They advanced to the Second Round of the NCAA Tournament that year, for the first time since 1988. The Golden Bears finished with twelve total wins in the next two years, and qualified for the NCAA tournament in both years, but could not advance past the Second Round. The Golden Bears only finished 7–8–4 in 2003, finishing under .500 for the second time in team history. They also broke a streak of five consecutive NCAA Tournament qualifications. The downturn did not last long as the team finished 11–6–3 in 2004, and qualified for the NCAA Tournament, but could not advance past the First Round. In 2005, the Golden Bears finished with sixteen wins, and had their best conference record in the Pac-12, finishing 7–1–1, however, they finished in Second Place. They made the Third Round of the NCAA Tournament, their best finish since 1988. 2006 was Kevin Boyd's final season, and the team finished 12–5–5 and extended their streak of NCAA qualifications to three in a row. Neil McGuire was hired in 2007 and lead the team to instant success as they finished 15–5–1 in his first season. The successive seasons in 2008 and 2009 didn't reach as great heights, but the team continued to qualify for the NCAA tournament and finished both seasons with double-digit wins.

=== 2010s ===
McGuire was the coach throughout the 2010s and the team enjoyed general success during the decade. It began with their first single digit win total since 1993, when the team finished with nine wins in 2010. However, the team still finished above .500 at 9–6–5. They continued to qualify for the NCAA Tournament, but were eliminated in the First Round. Win totals improved in both 2011 and 2012 with twelve and sixteen respectively. Their sixteen wins in 2012 were the most since 2000, and tied for the second most in program history. The team qualified for the NCAA Tournament in both years, and reached the Second Round both times. The Golden Bears finished third in the Pac-12 standings both years. In 2013, the team finished 11–5–5, and 4–4–3, in Pac-12 play, halving their Pac-12 wins from the year prior. They reached the First Round of the NCAA Tournament in 2013. 2014-2017 were very similar years as the team finished with thirteen wins in 2015, 2016, and 2017, and had fourteen wins in 2014. They finished tied for fourth, fifth twice, and sixth in the Pac-12 over this span. The Golden Bears qualified for the NCAA Tournament in each year, and were eliminated in the First Round in all but 2014, where they reached the Second Round. 2018 was a departure from the steady norm as the team finished 5–12–2 and 1–9–1 in Pac-12 play. This was their lowest conference win total in program history, and tied for the lowest number of overall wins with 1994. They ended a streak of fourteen straight NCAA Tournament qualifications. The decade closed with a quick rebound, as the team finished 13–5–3, 5–3–3 in Pac-12 play to finish in fifth place. They qualified for the NCAA Tournament, but were eliminated in the First Round.

=== 2020s ===
The decade started with a season shortened by the COVID-19 pandemic. The team played a shortened non-conference schedule, and played ten games in Pac-12 play instead of the usual eleven. The Golden Bears finished 3–7–0 in Pac-12 play to tie a program worst finish of eleventh place. In 2021 the team finished above .500 again, finishing 8–7–3 and tied for seventh in Pac-12 play. They resumed qualification to the NCAA Tournament in 2022 when they finished 10–5–6 and 5–3–3 in Pac-12 play to finish in fourth place. They were eliminated in the First Round of the NCAA Tournament. In their final season in the Pac-12 they finished 7–6–6 and 4–3–4 to finish in a tie for fifth place, they were not invited to the NCAA Tournament. In 2024, the Golden Bears played their first season in the Atlantic Coast Conference. The team finished with more than ten wins for the first time in the decade, finishing 13–6–2. In the first ACC conference season, they finished 5–4–1, and tied for seventh place. This was one spot out of qualifying for their first conference tournament in program history. They were selected to the NCAA Tournament and qualified for the Second Round for the first time since 2014. The Golden Bears were not as successful in 2025, finishing 8–3–8 overall and 4–2–4 in ACC play. They did not qualify for the ACC or NCAA Tournaments.

==== Bullying lawsuit ====
Former player Renee Thomas, and four other plaintiffs sued Neil McGuire, the UC Regents, UC Berkeley administration, and Athletic Director Jim Knowlton. McGuire is accused of sexual harassment and the other defendants are accused of creating a culture of "pervasive sexual harassment" along with failing to investigate accusations. According to court records, at least nine women have complained about McGuire since 2016. Many of these allegations came to light in 2020 in a local TV investigation published by KTVU. Lawsuits were later filed in both federal and state courts and as of 2025, cases are ongoing.

== Personnel ==
=== Current roster ===
As of February 3, 2026

Note: Flags indicate national team as defined under FIFA eligibility rules; some limited exceptions apply. Players may hold more than one non-FIFA nationality.

No.	Pos.	Nation	Player
0	GK	USA	Sophia Keel
1	GK	USA	Teagan Wy
2	FW	GER	Amelie Hoppe
3	DF	USA	Gianna Owens
4	MF	USA	Reese Doherty
6	FW	USA	Kenley Whittaker
7	FW	USA	Mia Fontana
8	GK	USA	Morgan Farnham
9	FW	USA	Mia Van More
11	FW	USA	Elhom Khursand
12	DF	USA	Elle Kivo
13	FW	USA	Malia McMahon
14	DF	NZL	Emily Humphrey
15	DF	USA	Hope Luebbe Davidson

No.	Pos.	Nation	Player
16	FW	USA	Soleil Dimry
18	GK	USA	Maddie Gambs
19	FW	USA	Lumi Kostmayer
20	DF	USA	Olivia McPherson
22	MF	SCO	Cara Borthwick
23	MF	USA	Lizzie Vranesh
24	DF	USA	Summer Starsiak
25	MF	USA	Campbell Carroll
26	DF	GER	Miriam Hils
28	MF	USA	Victoria Jones
34	MF	USA	Emelia Warta
36	MF	USA	Coco Thistle
39	MF	USA	Noelle Bond-Flasza
40	DF	USA	Archer Streelman

=== Team management ===
Position	Staff
Head coach	Neil McGuire
Associate Head Coach	Cori Callahan
Assistant Coach	Alec Sundly

== Seasons ==
Season	Head coach	Season result							Tournament results	
Season	Head coach	Overall			Conference				Conference	NCAA
Season	Head coach	Wins	Losses	Ties	Wins	Losses	Ties	Finish	Conference	NCAA
1982	Pat Keohane	6	0	0	The Golden Bears did not compete in a conference.					
1983	Bill Merrell	10	2	3	The Golden Bears did not compete in a conference.					Quarterfinals
1984	Bill Merrell	13	5	1	The Golden Bears did not compete in a conference.					Semifinals
1985	Bill Merrell	13	4	2	The Golden Bears did not compete in a conference.					
1986	Peter Reynaud	16	3	1	The Golden Bears did not compete in a conference.					Quarterfinals
1987	Jean-Paul Verhees	16	1	0	The Golden Bears did not compete in a conference.					Semifinals
1988	Jean-Paul Verhees	16	5	2	The Golden Bears did not compete in a conference.					Semifinals
1989	Bill Merrell	14	3	1	The Golden Bears did not compete in a conference.					
1990	Bill Merrell	11	6	2	The Golden Bears did not compete in a conference.					
1991	Andy Bonchonsky	9	8	0	The Golden Bears did not compete in a conference.					
1992	Andy Bonchonsky	8	8	2	The Golden Bears did not compete in a conference.					
1993	Andy Bonchonsky	10	4	4	The Golden Bears did not compete in a conference.					First Round
1994	Andy Bonchonsky	5	9	4	The Golden Bears did not compete in a conference.					
1995†	Andy Bonchonsky	8	10	1	3	4	0	T-5th	The; Pac-12 did not sponsor a women's soccer tournament.	
1996	Andy Bonchonsky	13	3	2	5	2	0	2nd	The; Pac-12 did not sponsor a women's soccer tournament.	
1997	Kevin Boyd	11	7	1	6	3	0	4th	The; Pac-12 did not sponsor a women's soccer tournament.	
1998	Kevin Boyd	13	8	0	7	2	0	T-1st	The; Pac-12 did not sponsor a women's soccer tournament.	First Round
1999	Kevin Boyd	13	7	1	6	3	0	4th	The; Pac-12 did not sponsor a women's soccer tournament.	First Round
2000	Kevin Boyd	17	3	1	7	2	0	2nd	The; Pac-12 did not sponsor a women's soccer tournament.	Second Round
2001	Kevin Boyd	12	7	2	4	4	1	T5th	The; Pac-12 did not sponsor a women's soccer tournament.	First Round
2002	Kevin Boyd	12	8	1	4	5	0	T-6th	The; Pac-12 did not sponsor a women's soccer tournament.	Second Round
2003	Kevin Boyd	7	8	4	2	6	1	T-9th	The; Pac-12 did not sponsor a women's soccer tournament.	
2004	Kevin Boyd	11	6	3	4	3	2	T-4th	The; Pac-12 did not sponsor a women's soccer tournament.	First Round
2005	Kevin Boyd	16	4	2	7	1	1	2nd	The; Pac-12 did not sponsor a women's soccer tournament.	Third Round
2006	Kevin Boyd	12	5	5	3	3	3	6th	The; Pac-12 did not sponsor a women's soccer tournament.	Second Round
2007	Neil McGuire	15	5	1	6	3	0	T-3rd	The; Pac-12 did not sponsor a women's soccer tournament.	Second Round
2008	Neil McGuire	10	9	1	3	5	1	6th	The; Pac-12 did not sponsor a women's soccer tournament.	First Round
2009	Neil McGuire	11	9	1	4	5	0	T-6th	The; Pac-12 did not sponsor a women's soccer tournament.	Second Round
2010	Neil McGuire	9	6	5	4	4	1	5th	The; Pac-12 did not sponsor a women's soccer tournament.	First Round
2011	Neil McGuire	12	6	4	5	4	2	T-3rd	The; Pac-12 did not sponsor a women's soccer tournament.	Second Round
2012	Neil McGuire	16	6	0	8	3	0	3rd	The; Pac-12 did not sponsor a women's soccer tournament.	Second Round
2013	Neil McGuire	11	5	5	4	4	3	5th	The; Pac-12 did not sponsor a women's soccer tournament.	First Round
2014	Neil McGuire	14	6	2	5	4	2	5th	The; Pac-12 did not sponsor a women's soccer tournament.	Second Round
2015	Neil McGuire	13	6	3	6	4	1	T-4th	The; Pac-12 did not sponsor a women's soccer tournament.	First Round
2016	Neil McGuire	13	5	3	6	3	2	6th	The; Pac-12 did not sponsor a women's soccer tournament.	First Round
2017	Neil McGuire	13	6	1	6	4	1	5th	The; Pac-12 did not sponsor a women's soccer tournament.	First Round
2018	Neil McGuire	5	12	2	1	9	1	11th	The; Pac-12 did not sponsor a women's soccer tournament.	
2019	Neil McGuire	13	5	3	5	3	3	5th	The; Pac-12 did not sponsor a women's soccer tournament.	First Round
2020	Neil McGuire	5	7	1	3	7	0	11th	The; Pac-12 did not sponsor a women's soccer tournament.	
2021	Neil McGuire	8	7	3	4	6	1	T-7th	The; Pac-12 did not sponsor a women's soccer tournament.	
2022	Neil McGuire	10	5	6	5	3	3	4th	The; Pac-12 did not sponsor a women's soccer tournament.	First Round
2023	Neil McGuire	7	6	6	4	3	4	T-5th	The; Pac-12 did not sponsor a women's soccer tournament.	
2024^	Neil McGuire	13	6	2	5	4	1	T-7th		Second Round
2025	Neil McGuire	8	3	8	4	2	4	8th		

† In 1995 the Pac-12 Conference began sponsoring women's soccer.
^ In 2024 California began play in the Atlantic Coast Conference.

== Notable alumni ==
=== Current Professional Players ===
As of February 3, 2026

- (United States) Lesle Gallimore (1982–1985) – Currently general manager of Seattle Reign FC
- Betsy Hassett (2009–2012) – Currently with Stjarnan and New Zealand international
- (United States) Genessee Daughetee (2010–2013) – Currently assistant coach with Rice
- (United States) Celeste Boureille (2012–2015) – Currently with Leicester City
- (Mexico) Annia Mejía (2014–2016) – Currently with Club América
- Guro Bergsvand (2014–2017) – Currently with VfL Wolfsburg and Norway international
- (Thailand) Miranda Nild (2015–2018) – Currently with Oakland Soul SC
- (United States) Mia Corbin (2016–2019) – Currently with Carolina Ascent FC
- Abi Kim (2016–2019) – Currently with Neom SC and Ghana international
- Sydney Collins (2018–2022) – Currently with Bay FC and Canada international
- (United States) Paige Metayer (2018–2022) – Currently with Washington Spirit
- (United States) Angelina Anderson (2019–2022) – Currently with Angel City FC
- (United States) Ayo Oke (2021–2022) – Currently with Denver Summit FC and USA international
- (United States) Karlie Lema (2021–2024) – Currently with Bay FC
- (United States) Teagan Wy (2022–2025) – Currently with Gotham FC
