= Boston College Eagles women's soccer =

American college soccer team

- 2025 Boston College Eagles women's soccer team
- Founded: 1977; 49 years ago
- University: Boston College
- Head coach: Chris Watkins (3rd season)
- Conference: ACC
- Location: Chestnut Hill, Massachusetts, US
- Stadium: Newton Campus Soccer Field (capacity: 2,000)
- Nickname: Eagles
- Colors: Maroon and gold
Home	Away

NCAA tournament College Cup
- 2010

NCAA tournament Quarterfinals
- 1983, 1985, 2009, 2010, 2013

NCAA tournament Round of 16
- 1999, 2004, 2005, 2006, 2008, 2009, 2010, 2011, 2013

NCAA tournament appearances
- 1982, 1983, 1984, 1985, 1999, 2001, 2003, 2004, 2005, 2006, 2007, 2008, 2009, 2010, 2011, 2012, 2013, 2015, 2018

The Boston College Eagles women's soccer team is who represents Boston College in the Atlantic Coast Conference (ACC) of NCAA Division I women's college soccer. The team to date has never won the ACC regular season championship, but has won the ECAC championship twice and shared the ACC regular season title once. The team has advanced to the NCAA Women's soccer tournament 19 times, including one College Cup appearance.

== History ==
=== 1980s ===
The Boston College women's soccer program enjoyed a rather successful start to their history under coach Mike LaVigne. LaVigne never lost more than 5 games during his tenure in the 1980s. He took the team to their first two NCAA Tournaments in 1982 and 1983. The team was also ranked in the top 10 in 1981–1984. However, citing issues with then Athletic Director Mary Carson and the lack of a field for the 1983 NCAA Tournament, LaVigne resigned as head coach. Susan Kaplan was hired as the new head coach and coached the team through the end of the decade. The team qualified for the NCAA tournament 2 times under Kaplan, in 1984 and 1985. Kaplan also guided the team to double digit wins in 4 of her 6 seasons in charge. The team won the ECAC championship in 1986 and 1988. Kaplan left the program in 1989.

=== 1990s ===
Terez Biancardi took over the program in 1990. The first two years of her tenure proved difficult, with the Eagles winning 6 and 7 games during those years. However, the next few years proved to be a return to form, with the team notching double digit wins in 1992–1994. In 1993 the team moved to the Big East Conference. This move was associated with Boston College becoming a full member of the conference. The first years were fairly successful, with the team finishing runners up in the 1994 Big East Tournament. However, their good run would not continue. The team failed to make the NCAA and Conference tournament in 1995 and 1996. After finishing both seasons with 9 wins, Biancardi would leave the program in 1996. Alison Foley was hired as the next head coach. The team won 12 games in 1998, her second season and 16 games in 1999. The team returned to the NCAA Tournament in 1999, losing in the first round. In 1999, Foley was awarded the NEWISA New England Coach of the Year Award.

=== 2000s ===
Alison Foley continued to coach the team throughout the 2000s. The team enjoyed success during the decade, never losing more than 10 games, and notching double digit wins in each season. They made the NCAA Tournament 8 of the 10 years, and achieved their first quarterfinal appearance in 2009. Boston College decided to leave the Big East and join the Atlantic Coast Conference (ACC) in 2003. The move took 2 years to complete, and starting in 2005, the Eagles began ACC competition. The team's last season in the Big East, 2004, proved one of their best, as they finished 7–3 in conference play and made the semifinals of the conference tournament. The early years in the ACC were also positive, with the team finishing no lower than fifth in the conference between 2005 and 2010. The team won a share of the regular season title in 2009. The Eagles finished the decade strong, with their first and only College Cup appearance in 2010.

=== 2010s ===
The Eagles continued to enjoy some success in the 2010s, qualifying for the NCAA tournament in 5 years and the ACC Tournament 6 years. In 2014, they ended a streak of 11 straight NCAA appearances when they missed the tournament after a 10–8–1 season. This was on the heels of a 2013 season where they made the NCAA Quarterfinals for the third time in program history. Many of the Eagle's most famous players played for the team during this period, including Kristie Mewis who went on to play for the United States women's national soccer team. From 2014 to 2017, the Eagles experienced a bit of a downturn, never finishing above seventh in the ACC, and only making the NCAA tournament once. In 2017, they made the ACC tournament as the last invited team. 2018 was a turnaround year, where the team finished 14–4–1, qualifying for both the ACC tournament and the NCAA tournament. They also won 10 straight games, tying a program record for most consecutive wins in a season. After the season, Alison Foley resigned as coach after 22 years. There were some questions over the reasoning behind her resignation, as the team had 22 winning seasons under her, and made the NCAA Tournament 15 times during her tenure. Jason Lowe was hired as the new coach in January 2019. In Lowe's first year, the Eagles finished 14th in the ACC, their lowest ever. Their 1–8–1 record was also the program's worst ever ACC record.

=== 2020s ===
The decade started with a season shortened by the COVID-19 pandemic. The team played an ACC fall season and a non-conference spring season. They finished 3–10–1 overall and did not qualify for the postseason. The team played a full 2021 season, finishing 7–10–1 overall and 1–9–0 in ACC play to finish in a tie for twelfth place. This marked the third straight year where the Eagles won only one conference game, and their 7 overall wins were the lowest in a full season since 1991. The team's fortunes did not improve in 2022, when they finished 5–8–5 overall and 1–7–2 in ACC play. This was the fourth straight year, and every year in Lowe's tenure, where the Eagles won only one conference game. The five overall wins were the lowest in a full season in program history until the next year in 2023 when the Eagles finished 3–9–6 overall. They also finished 0–6–4 in ACC play. The three wins and zero conference wins were program lows at the time and the six draws were a program high. Lowe was fired after the 2023 season and replaced by Chris Watkins. Watkins had a successful first season, finishing 12–5–2 overall and 4–4–2 in ACC play. These were both the best records since the 2018 season, but ultimately not enough to qualify for the ACC tournament or NCAA Tournament. Watkins' second season appeared to be a reversion to the mean that was achieved under Lowe. The Eagles finished 5–8–5 overall and 1–7–2. They did not qualify for any postseason tournaments.

== Personnel ==
=== Current roster ===
As of December 29, 2025

Note: Flags indicate national team as defined under FIFA eligibility rules; some limited exceptions apply. Players may hold more than one non-FIFA nationality.

No.	Pos.	Nation	Player
0	GK	USA	Alexandria Lofton
1	GK	USA	Olivia Shippee
2	MF	USA	Natalie Grosse
3	MF	USA	Delaney Van Pelt
4	FW	USA	Emily Mara
5	FW	USA	Milla Lee
6	DF	USA	Ava McNeil
7	MF	USA	Georgina Clarke
8	MF	USA	Bella Douglas
9	FW	USA	Sydney Segalla
10	MF	USA	Tess Barrett
11	FW	USA	Sadie Mathis
12	DF	USA	Amalia Dray
13	MF	USA	Lily Killski
14	FW	NOR	Ada Henschien

No.	Pos.	Nation	Player
15	MF	CAN	Ashley Roberts
16	MF	USA	Elly Slensky
17	FW	USA	Sohana Spencer
18	DF	USA	Sienna Ward
20	MF	USA	Baylor Goldthwaite
21	MF	USA	Anndi Wright
22	DF	USA	Dylan Lochhead
23	FW	USA	Elsa Freeman
24	FW	USA	Sophie Reale
25	MF	USA	Sophia Lowenberg
27	DF	USA	Lydia Poulin
32	GK	USA	Este Tejpaul
33	GK	CAN	Faith Fenwick
—	DF	USA	Emmy Easterly

=== Team management ===
Position	Staff
Head coach	Chris Watkins
Assistant Coach	Andrea Morrow
Assistant Coach	Stephanie Demake
Assistant Coach	Grace Barnard
Director of Operations	Molly Abbott

== Seasons ==
Season	Head coach	Season result							Tournament results	
Season	Head coach	Overall			Conference				Conference	NCAA
Season	Head coach	Wins	Losses	Ties	Wins	Losses	Ties	Finish	Conference	NCAA
1980	Mike LaVigne	10	4	0						—
1981	Mike LaVigne	8	5	1						—
1982	Mike LaVigne	11	3	1						NCAA First Round
1983	Mike LaVigne	15	5	0						NCAA Second Round
1984	Suzanne Kaplan	12	6	1						NCAA First Round
1985	Suzanne Kaplan	13	5	1						NCAA Second Round
1986	Suzanne Kaplan	11	6	2				Champions		—
1987	Suzanne Kaplan	7	6	2						—
1988	Suzanne Kaplan	12	7	1				Champions		—
1989	Suzanne Kaplan	8	9	2						—
1990	Terez Biancardi	6	7	3						—
1991	Terez Biancardi	7	7	1						—
1992	Terez Biancardi	13	8	0						—
1993†	Terez Biancardi	12	9	0					Semifinal	—
1994	Terez Biancardi	10	8	1					Runner up	—
1995	Terez Biancardi	9	7	2	4	4	0	5th	—	—
1996	Terez Biancardi	9	8	0	4	5	0	6th	—	—
1997	Alison Foley	9	6	2	5	6	0	6th	—	—
1998	Alison Foley	12	6	3	5	3	3	5th	Semifinal	—
1999	Alison Foley	16	7	1	2	2	1	3rd (Northeast)	Semifinal	NCAA First Round
2000	Alison Foley	14	7	0	4	1	0	2nd (Northeast)	Semifinal	—
2001	Alison Foley	11	10	1	3	2	1	2nd (Northeast)	Semifinal	NCAA First Round
2002	Alison Foley	11	8	1	4	2	0	3rd (Northeast)	Quarterfinal	—
2003	Alison Foley	15	3	3	3	2	1	2nd (Northeast)	Runner up	NCAA First Round
2004	Alison Foley	15	7	1	7	3	0	4th	Semifinal	NCAA Third Round
2005^	Alison Foley	13	6	2	5	4	1	5th	1st round	NCAA Third Round
2006	Alison Foley	12	7	3	5	3	2	4th	1st round	NCAA Third Round
2007	Alison Foley	11	5	4	4	4	2	5th	1st round	NCAA First Round
2008	Alison Foley	15	6	2	6	3	1	3rd	2nd round	NCAA Third Round
2009	Alison Foley	18	4	2	7	2	1	Co-champions	2nd round	NCAA Quarterfinals
2010	Alison Foley	17	7	1	5	5	0	6th	1st round	NCAA Semifinals
2011	Alison Foley	12	6	3	6	4	0	3rd	1st round	NCAA Third Round
2012	Alison Foley	11	8	3	4	5	1	T-8th	1st round	NCAA Second Round
2013	Alison Foley	13	10	1	6	6	1	T-6th	1st round	NCAA Quarterfinals
2014	Alison Foley	10	8	1	3	6	1	10th	—	—
2015	Alison Foley	11	7	2	5	3	2	7th	—	NCAA First Round
2016	Alison Foley	11	8	1	3	7	0	12th	—	—
2017	Alison Foley	10	9	1	4	5	1	8th	First round	—
2018	Alison Foley	14	5	1	6	3	1	4th	First round	NCAA First Round
2019	Jason Lowe	8	8	2	1	8	1	14th	—	—
2020	Jason Lowe	3	10	1	1	7	0	11th	—	—
2021	Jason Lowe	7	10	1	1	9	0	T-12th	—	—
2022	Jason Lowe	5	8	5	1	7	2	14th	—	—
2023	Jason Lowe	3	9	6	0	6	4	13th	—	—
2024	Chris Watkins	12	5	2	4	4	2	10th	—	—
2025	Chris Watkins	5	8	5	1	7	2	T-14th	—	—

† In 1993 Boston College began play in the Big East Conference.
^ In 2005 Boston College began play in the Atlantic Coast Conference.

== Notable alumni ==
=== Current Professional Players ===
As of December 29, 2025

- (United States) Kia McNeill – (2004–2007) – Currently head coach of Brown
- Allyson Swaby – (2014–2017) – Currently with Crystal Palace and Jamaica international
- (United States) Sam Hiatt – (2016) – Currently with Portland Thorns FC
- (United States) Jenna Bike – (2016–2021) – Currently with Chicago Stars FC
- Sam Coffey – (2017–2018) – Currently with Portland Thorns FC and United States international
- (United States) Kayla Duran – (2018–2019) – Currently with Gotham FC
- (United States) Sammy Smith – (2019–2022) – Currently with Boston Legacy FC
- (United States) Haley Thomas – (2021) – Currently with Spokane Zephyr FC
- (United States) Sophia Lowenberg – (2022–2025) – Currently with Boston Legacy FC
