= Texas Longhorns women's soccer =

American college soccer team

- Founded: 1994
- University: University of Texas at Austin
- Athletic director: Chris Del Conte
- Head coach: Margueritte Aozasa (1st season)
- Conference: SEC
- Location: Austin, Texas, US
- Stadium: Mike A. Myers Stadium (capacity: 20,000)
- Nickname: Longhorns
- Colors: Burnt orange and white
Home	Away

NCAA tournament Round of 16
- 2004, 2006, 2007, 2017, 2023

NCAA tournament Round of 32
- 2004, 2006, 2007, 2008, 2014, 2017, 2023, 2024

NCAA tournament appearances
- 2001, 2002, 2003, 2004, 2005, 2006, 2007, 2008, 2010, 2011, 2014, 2017, 2018, 2019, 2021, 2022, 2023, 2024

Conference tournament championships
- 2006, 2007, 2023, 2024

Conference regular season championships
- 2001, 2022

The Texas Longhorns women's soccer team represents the University of Texas at Austin in NCAA Division I intercollegiate soccer competition. The Longhorns competed in the Big 12 Conference through the 2023 season and moved to the Southeastern Conference (SEC) on July 1, 2024.

== History ==
The program played club soccer intercollegiately in the 1980s, including a 1–0 loss to UNC in the 1983 WAGS tournament. It was established as a varsity program in 1993 as part of that year's Title IX settlement. Since then they have won three conference championships – one regular season and two tournaments — and been to 14 NCAA tournaments, making it as far as the Sweet Sixteen in 2004, 2006, 2007, 2017, and 2023.

In 2006 the Longhorns finished ranked #8 in the nation, their highest end-of-season ranking ever.

== Current squad ==
As of November 2026

Note: Flags indicate national team as defined under FIFA eligibility rules; some limited exceptions apply. Players may hold more than one non-FIFA nationality.

No.	Pos.	Nation	Player
00	GK	USA	Caroline Dill
0	GK	USA	Bayliss Flynn
1	FW	USA	Ava McDonald
2	DF	USA	Melanie Hintsa
3	MF	USA	Arianna Brothers
4	DF	USA	Ashley Moody
5	MF	USA	Ava Cashman
7	FW	USA	Audrey Bryant
9	MF	USA	Sadie Hoch
11	DF	USA	Mya Brandon
12	DF	USA	Zoey Lavezzi
13	FW	USA	Ashlyn Anderson
15	FW	USA	Alicia Riggins
17	MF	USA	Molly MacMillan

No.	Pos.	Nation	Player
18	FW	USA	Callan Harrington
20	DF	USA	Vivian Geesbreght
21	DF	USA	Toni Lopez
23	DF	USA	EmJ Witt
24	MF	USA	Kennedi Cotter
25	GK	USA	Mateya Dessieux
26	DF	USA	Cambry Patrick
27	MF	USA	Hannah Tate
28	DF	USA	Amaya Haley
29	DF	USA	Paige Mouw
31	GK	ENG	Annis-Clara Wright
34	MF	USA	Addie Brink
44	MF	USA	Amalia Villarreal
52	MF	USA	Caroline Swann

== All-time season results ==
Season	Coach	Overall	Conference	Standing	Postseason
Dang Pibulvech (1994)
1994	Dang Pibulvech	9–7–2			
Dang Pibulvech (Southwest Conference) (1995)
1995	Dang Pibulvech	7–14–0	1–3–0	3rd	
Dang Pibulvech (Big 12) (1996–1998)
1996	Dang Pibulvech	8–10–2	4–5–0	6th	
1997	Dang Pibulvech	10–10–0	7–3–0	4th	
1998	Dang Pibulvech	6–9–3	4–3–3	T-4th	
Dang Pibulvech:		40–50–7	SWC: 1–3–0; Big 12: 15–11–3		
Chris Petrucelli (Big 12) (1999–2011)
1999	Chris Petrucelli	8–9–2	4–4–2	5th	
2000	Chris Petrucelli	12–7–0	7–3–0	3rd	
2001	Chris Petrucelli	14–6–0	9–1–0	1st	NCAA 1st Round
2002	Chris Petrucelli	15–5–1	9–1–0	2nd	NCAA 1st Round
2003	Chris Petrucelli	12–9–0	7–3–0	2nd	NCAA 1st Round
2004	Chris Petrucelli	15–7–2	6–3–1	T-3rd	NCAA Sweet 16
2005	Chris Petrucelli	11–9–1	6–4–0	6th	NCAA 1st Round
2006	Chris Petrucelli	18–4–3	8–1–1	T-2nd	NCAA Sweet 16
2007	Chris Petrucelli	16–4–5	6–2–2	2nd	NCAA Sweet 16
2008	Chris Petrucelli	13–4–4	5–2–3	6th	NCAA 2nd Round
2009	Chris Petrucelli	9–9–3	4–3–3	6th	
2010	Chris Petrucelli	11–6–4	4–3–3	5th	NCAA 1st Round
2011	Chris Petrucelli	11–9–1	3–4–1	T-4th	NCAA 1st Round
Chris Petrucelli:		165–88–26	78–34–16		
Angela Kelly (Big 12) (2012–present)
2012	Angela Kelly	8–10–2	4–4–0	4th	
2013	Angela Kelly	12–6–2	5–2–1	3rd	
2014	Angela Kelly	11–8–4	4–4–0	5th	NCAA 2nd Round
2015	Angela Kelly	8–6–4	4–3–1	3rd	
2016	Angela Kelly	8–9–1	1–6–1	9th	
2017	Angela Kelly	14–4–3	5–2–2	4th	NCAA Sweet 16
2018	Angela Kelly	13–5–3	5–3–1	T-3rd	NCAA 1st Round
2019	Angela Kelly	11–8–1	6–3–0	3rd	NCAA 1st Round
2020	Angela Kelly	7–5–0	4–5–0	6th	Postseason canceled due to pandemic
2021	Angela Kelly	11–5–6	6–0–3	2nd	NCAA 1st Round
2022	Angela Kelly	15–3–4	7–0–2	1st	NCAA 2nd Round
2023	Angela Kelly	17-5-2	6-3-1	4th	NCAA Sweet 16
Angela Kelly (SEC) (2024–2025)
2024	Angela Kelly	17–4–2	6–3–1	1st	NCAA 2nd Round
2025	Angela Kelly	4–12–1	2–8–0	14th	
Angela Kelly:		160–90–35	65–46–13		
Margueritte Aozasa (SEC) (2026–present)
2026	Margueritte Aozasa	0–0–0	0–0–0		
Margueritte Aozasa:		0–0–0	0–0–0		
Total:		361–229–68			
National champion Postseason invitational champion Conference regular season champion Conference regular season and conference tournament champion Division regular season champion Division regular season and conference tournament champion Conference tournament champion

== All-time series records ==
=== Big 12 members ===
Team	First	Last	Series	Home	Away	Neutral	Postseason	Conference Tournament	NCAA Tournament
Baylor	1996	2021	10–9–5	8–3–2	2–3–3	0–3–0	0–3–0	0–3–0	-
Iowa State	1996	2021	25–3–1	12–1–0	10–2–1	3–0–0	3–0–0	3–0–0	-
Kansas	1996	2021	18–8–3	8–3–1	9–4–1	1–1–1	1–1–1	1–1–1	-
Kansas State	2016	2021	6–0–0	3–0–0	3–0–0	0-0-0	-	-	-
Oklahoma	1997	2021	18–9–2	9–2–1	7–5–1	2–2–0	2–2–0	2–2–0	-
Oklahoma State	1996	2021	11–13–7	7–5–1	3–5–5	1–3–1	1–3–1	1–3–1	-
TCU	1994	2021	10–6–4	6–1–2	3–5–0	0–0–3	0–0–3	0–0–3	-
Texas Tech	1994	2021	17–9–4	10–3–3	6–6–0	1–0–1	1–0–1	1–0–1	-
West Virginia	2004	2021	2–9–3	2–4–1	0–4–0	0–1–2	1–1–2	0–1–2	1–0–0

=== Former Big 12 and SWC members ===
Team	First	Last	Series	Home	Away	Neutral	Postseason	Conference Tournament	NCAA Tournament
SMU	1994	2021	1–6–2	1–1–0	0–1–2	0–4–0	0–3–0	-	0–3–0
Texas A&M	1994	2019	5–19–2	3–5–2	1–9–0	1–5–0	2–6–0	1–5–0	1–1–0
Missouri	1996	2011	13–4–2	6–1–1	6–1–1	1–2–0	1–2–0	1–2–0	-
Nebraska	1994	2010	10–10–0	6–2–0	2–7–0	2–1–0	2–1–0	2–1–0	-
Colorado	1996	2019	13–5–4	6–2–0	5–2–2	2–1–2	2–1–2	2–1–2	-

== Home field ==
Home Field	Seasons	Record
Whitaker Field	1994	6–1–0
Frank Denius Fields	1995–1998	18–11–2
Mike A. Myers Stadium	1999–present	164–53–22
Through 2021

=== Attendance records ===
Texas Women's Soccer
#	Date	Opponent	Attendance	Result
1	September 26, 2008	Texas A&M	5,585	T 0–0
2	August 25, 2000	North Carolina	5,440	L 2–9
3	November 2, 2001	Texas A&M	5,376	L 0–6
4	August 28, 2011	Texas A&M	4,222	L 0–3
5	October 27, 2006	Texas A&M	4,133	W 1–0
6	September 23, 2011	Baylor	3,867	L 0–1
7	September 20, 2002	Vanderbilt	3,406	W 1–0
8	August 31, 2001	North Carolina	3,233	L 0–1
9	September 27, 2013	TCU	2,841	W 2–0
10	September 24, 1999	Texas A&M	2,597	L 0–5
Through end of 2019

== Notable alumni ==
Main page: Category:Texas Longhorns women's soccer players

=== Current professional players ===
- Haley Berg (2017–2021) - Currently with Dallas Trinity
- Cyera Hintzen (2016–2019) - Currently with Dallas Trinity
- Lexi Missimo (2020–2024) - Currently with Dallas Trinity
