= UCLA Bruins women's soccer =

American college soccer team

- Founded: 1993; 33 years ago
- University: University of California, Los Angeles
- Head coach: Gof Boyoko (1st season)
- Conference: Big Ten
- Location: Los Angeles, California, US
- Stadium: Wallis Annenberg Stadium (capacity: 2,145)
- Nickname: Bruins
- Colors: Blue and gold
Home	Away

NCAA tournament championships
- 2013, 2022

NCAA tournament runner-up
- 2000, 2004, 2005, 2017

NCAA tournament Semifinals
- 2000, 2003, 2004, 2005, 2006, 2007, 2008, 2009, 2013, 2017, 2019, 2022

NCAA tournament Quarterfinals
- 1997, 2000, 2001, 2003, 2004, 2005, 2006, 2007, 2008, 2009, 2012, 2013, 2014, 2017, 2018, 2019, 2022

NCAA tournament Round of 16
- 1997, 1999, 2000, 2001, 2002, 2003, 2004, 2005, 2006, 2007, 2008, 2009, 2010, 2012, 2013, 2014, 2016, 2017, 2018, 2019, 2022

NCAA tournament appearances
- 1995, 1997, 1998, 1999, 2000, 2001, 2002, 2003, 2004, 2005, 2006, 2007, 2008, 2009, 2010, 2011, 2012, 2013, 2014, 2016, 2017, 2018, 2019, 2020, 2021, 2022, 2023, 2024, 2025, 2026

Conference tournament championships
- 2024

The UCLA Bruins women's soccer team is an intercollegiate varsity sports team of the University of California at Los Angeles. The team is a member of the Big Ten Conference of the National Collegiate Athletic Association.

The team won its first national championship on December 8, 2013, by defeating Florida State 1–0 in overtime. The Bruins won the program's second national title on December 5, 2022, beating North Carolina 3–2 in double overtime.

== Current roster ==
As of November 2026

Note: Flags indicate national team as defined under FIFA eligibility rules; some limited exceptions apply. Players may hold more than one non-FIFA nationality.

No.	Pos.	Nation	Player
00	GK	USA	Lynette Bryant
1	GK	USA	Daphne Nakfoor
2	MF	USA	Ava Priest
3	MF	USA	Laila Edris
4	FW	USA	Sammy Sanchez
5	MF	JPN	Asa Yamazaki
6	MF	USA	Grace Shank
7	DF	USA	Paloma Daubert
8	MF	USA	Anaiya Miyazato
10	MF	USA	Mia Corona
11	MF	USA	Marli Galdamez
12	DF	USA	Abby Gemma
13	GK	MEX	Mariangela Medina
14	MF	USA	Cate Sarinopoulos

No.	Pos.	Nation	Player
15	MF	USA	Julia Molnar
16	FW	USA	Leena Powell
17	DF	USA	Siena Meyer
18	MF	USA	Avery Robinson
19	FW	JPN	Oruha Hayashi
21	MF	USA	Thea Perry
22	FW	USA	Olivia Woodson
23	FW	USA	Kara Croone
24	FW	USA	Payten Cooper
25	DF	USA	Nicki Fraser
26	MF	USA	Fiona McGeough
27	DF	CAN	Molly Hale
28	DF	USA	Anna Wilson
33	DF	USA	Bela Araújo

== Seasons ==
Updated through October 30, 2022

Season	Coach	Record		Notes
Season	Coach	Overall	Conference	Notes
Pac-12 Conference
2011	B. J. Snow	16–1–4	8–1–2	NCAA T-17th, Pac-12 2nd
2012	B. J. Snow	18–3–2	8–2–1	NCAA T-5th, Pac-12 2nd
2013	Amanda Cromwell	22–1–3	9–0–2	NCAA Champions, Pac-12 1st
2014	Amanda Cromwell	21–0–2	10–0–1	NCAA Quarterfinals, Pac-12 1st
2015	Amanda Cromwell	8-10-1	4-6-1	Missed the NCAA Division I Women's Soccer Championship, Pac-12 8th
2016	Amanda Cromwell	15-6-1	7-3-1	NCAA Round of 16, Pac-12 4th
2017	Amanda Cromwell	19–3–3	8–2–1	NCAA 2nd, Pac-12 T-2nd
2018	Amanda Cromwell	17-3-2	9–2	NCAA T-5th, Pac-12 2nd
2019	Amanda Cromwell	18-5-1	8–3	NCAA T-3rd, Pac-12 2nd
2020	Amanda Cromwell	13-1-3	9-1-1	NCAA Round of 16, Pac-12 1st
2021	Amanda Cromwell	16–1–3	8–0–3	NCAA, Pac-12 1st
2022	Margueritte Aozasa	17–1	9–1	Best start in program history; new record crowd (2,446) set on October 30, 2022, at Wallis Annenberg Stadium; Rank No. 1; NCAA Champions (2nd title)
2023	Margueritte Aozasa	16–2–1	10–0–1	NCAA 1st Round
Big Ten Conference
2024	Margueritte Aozasa	17–4–3	8–1–2	Big Ten tournament champions, NCAA 2nd Round
2025	Margueritte Aozasa	12–5–4	6–2–3	NCAA 2nd Round
2026	Gof Boyoko	12–5–2	9–2–1	NCAA

Source: UCLA Athletics

== Postseason ==
The UCLA Bruins have an NCAA Division I Tournament record of 71–22 (including penalty kicks) through twenty-one appearances.

One of their most notable runs, the second-seeded Bruins trounced their first three opponents each by a 5–0 margin, before falling in the Elite Eight to the first-seeded UNC Tar Heels, who lead the nation with 22 NCAA Championship titles in program history. The match was decided in penalty kicks after regular time and overtime ended in a 2–2 draw.

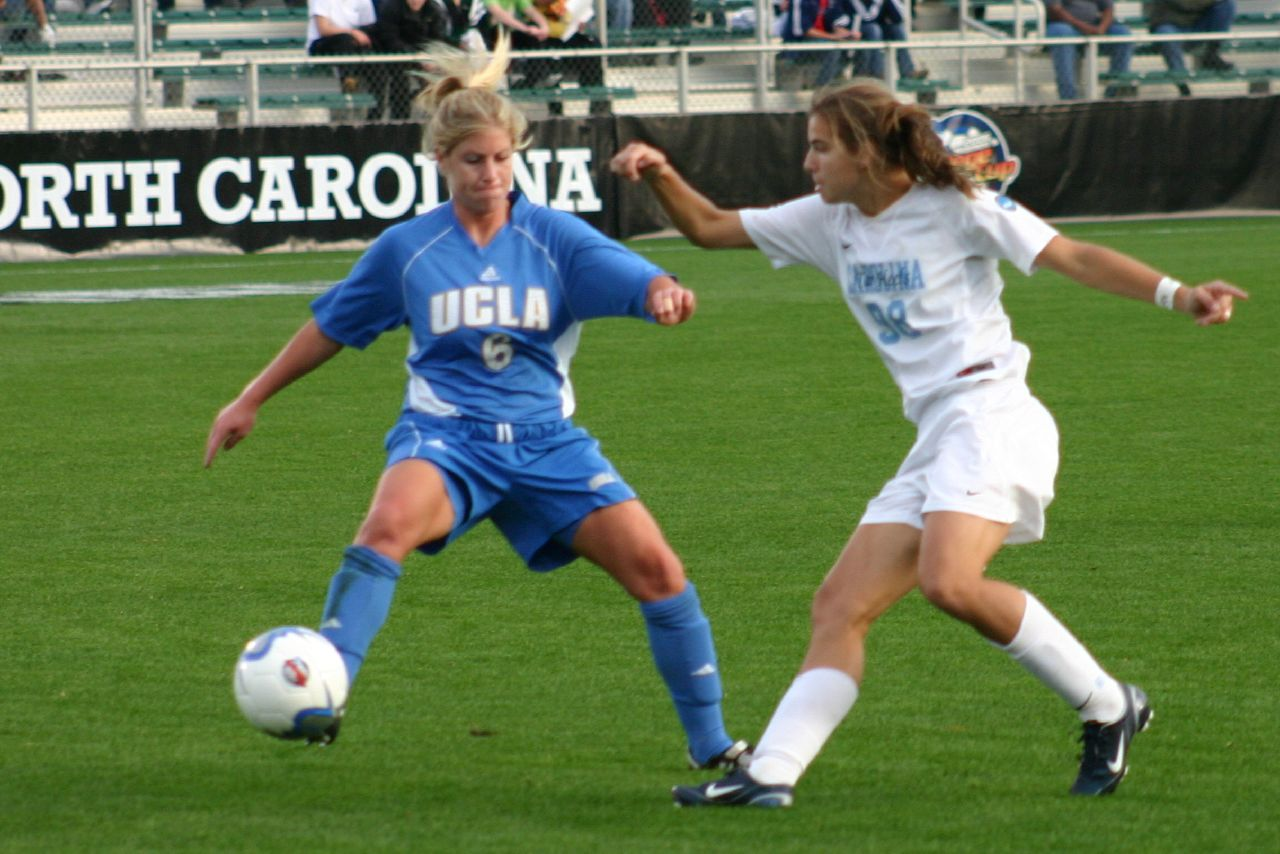
UCLA plays against North Carolina during the 2006 NCAA Division I women's soccer tournament

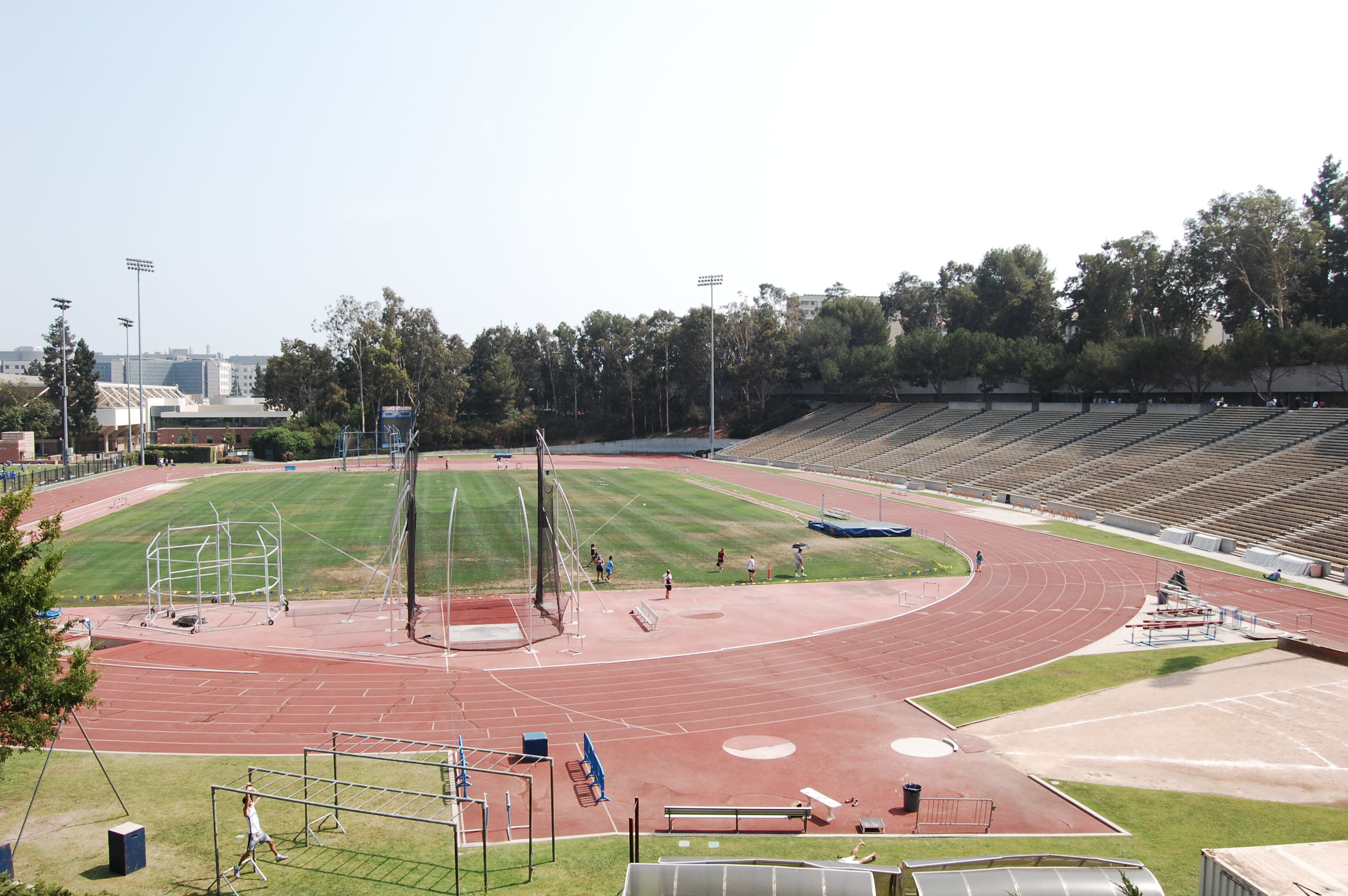
Drake Stadium was the home field of the soccer teams

Year	Round	Opponent	Result
1995	First round	Washington	L 1–2
1997	First round Second round Third round	Portland; SMU; Notre Dame	W 1–0; W 3–2; L 0–8
1998	Second round	BYU	L 0–2
1999	Second round Third round	San Diego; Santa Clara	W 2–1; L 0–7
2000	Second round Third round Quarterfinals; Semifinals; National Championship	USC; Texas A&M; Clemson; Portland; North Carolina	W 3–0; W 4–0; W 2–1; W 1–0; L 1–2
2001	First round Second round Third round Quarterfinals	CSU Fullerton; Pepperdine; Dayton; Florida	W 3–0; W 2–1; W 3–1; L 0–1
2002	First round Second round Third round	Loyola Marymount; USC; Texas A&M	W 4–0; W 1–0; L 0–1
2003	First round Second round Third round Quarterfinals; Semifinals	San Diego; Pepperdine; Kansas; Penn State; North Carolina	W 2–0; W 2–0; W 1–0; W 4–0; L 0–3
2004	First round Second round Third round Quarterfinals; Semifinals; National Championship	Pepperdine; San Diego; Duke; Ohio State; Princeton; Notre Dame	W 1–0; W 3–0; W 2–0; W 1–0; W 2–0; L 1–2
2005	First round Second round Third round Quarterfinals; Semifinals; National Championship	Mississippi Valley State; Colorado; Marquette; Virginia; Florida State; Portland	W 9–0; W 3–0; W 4–0; W 5–0; W 4–0; L 0–4
2006	First round Second round Third round Quarterfinals; Semifinals	UNLV; CSU Fullerton; Florida; Portland; North Carolina	W 6–1; W 3–1; W 3–2; W 2–1; L 0–2
2007	First round Second round Third round Quarterfinals; Semifinals	CSU Fullerton; Oklahoma State; Virginia; Portland; USC	W 3–1; W 4–0; W 2–1; W 3–2; L 1–2
2008	First round Second round Third round Quarterfinals; Semifinals	Fresno State; San Diego; USC; Duke; North Carolina	W 5–0; W 1–0; W 1–0; W 6–1; L 0–1
2009	First round Second round Third round Quarterfinals; Semifinals	Boise State; San Diego State; Virginia; Portland; Stanford	W 7–1; W 5–0; W 3–0; W 2–1; L 1–2
2010	First round Second round Third round	BYU; UCF; Stanford	W 1–0; W 2–1; L 0–3
2011	First round Second round	New Mexico; San Diego	W 1–0; L 1–2
2012	First round Second round Third round Quarterfinals	Wisconsin; Kentucky; San Diego State; Stanford	W 1–0; W 5–0; W 3–0; L 1–2
2013	First round Second round Third round Quarterfinals; Semifinals; National Championship	San Diego State; Kentucky; Stanford; North Carolina; Virginia; Florida State	W 3–0; W 3–0; W 2–0; W 1–0; W 2–1; W 1–0
2014	First round Second round Third round Quarterfinals	San Diego; Harvard; Pepperdine; Virginia	W 5–0; W 7–0; W 1–0; L 1–2
2016	First round Second round Third round	Seattle; Nebraska; West Virginia	W 3–0; W 2–0; L 1–2
2017	First round Second round Third round Quarterfinals; Semifinals; National Championship	San Diego State; Northwestern; Virginia; Princeton; Duke; Stanford	W 3–1; W 1–0; W 2–1; W 3–1; W 1–0; L 2–3
2018	First round Second round Third round Quarterfinals	San Jose State; Minnesota; NC State; North Carolina	W 5–0; W 5–0; W 5–0; L 2–4
2019	First round Second round Third round Quarterfinals; Semifinals	Lamar; Clemson; Wisconsin; Florida State; Stanford	W 4–1; W 5–0; W 2–0; W 4–0; L 1–4
2020	First round Second round Third round	– Iowa #6 Clemson	– W 2–1; L 1–1
2021	First round	UC Irvine	L 0–1
2022	First round Second round Third round Quarterfinals; Semifinals; National Championship	Northern Arizona; UCF; Northwestern; Virginia; Alabama; North Carolina	W 4–1; W 1–1 (3–0PK); W 2–0; W 2–1; W 3–0; W 3–2
2023	First round	UC Irvine	L 0–1
2024	First round Second round	California Baptist; Virginia Tech	W 2–1; L 1–2
2025	First round Second round	Pepperdine; BYU	W 3–1; L 1–1 (2–4PK)
2026	First round	Quinnipiac	

== Stadium ==
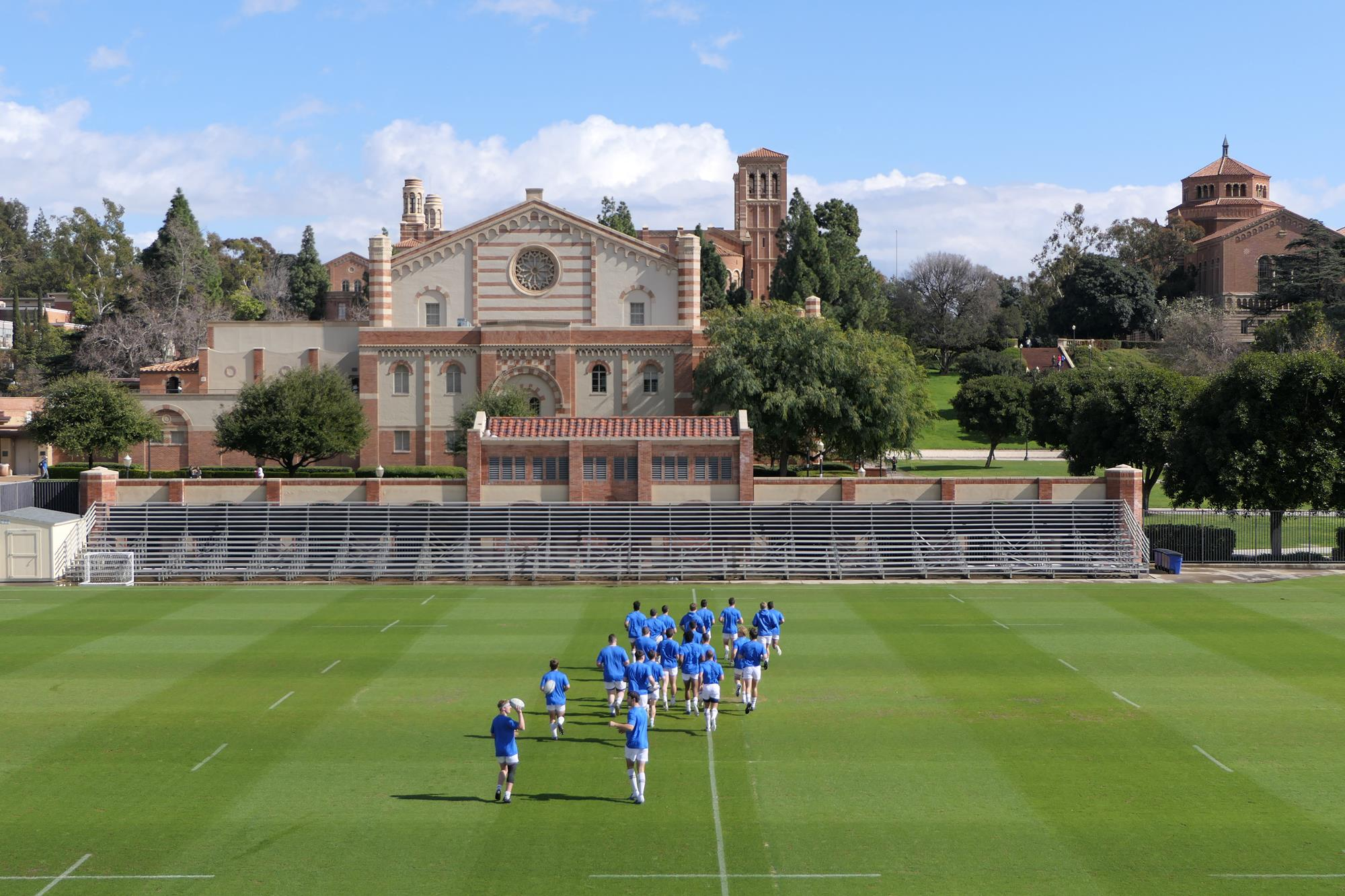
Wallis Annenberg Stadium, UCLA venue since 2018

The Bruins played their home games on the Frank Marshall Field of Drake Stadium on campus until 2017. The stadium is named in honor of Elvin C. "Ducky" Drake, UCLA's longtime trainer and former student athlete. Film producer Marshall graduated from UCLA.

In 2018, the Bruins moved to the soccer-specific stadium, Wallis Annenberg Stadium, along with the UCLA Bruins men's soccer program. On September 23, 2022, a capacity crowd of 2,237 saw the women's team defeating Cal 4–2 at Annenberg Stadium.

== Notable alumni ==
This list of former players includes those who received international caps, made significant contributions to the team in terms of appearances or goals, or who made significant contributions to the sport after they left. It is clearly not yet complete and all inclusive, and additions and refinements will continue to be made over time.

- (United States) Louise Lieberman (1996–2000)
- (United States) Lauren Holiday (2006–2009)
- (United States) Sydney Leroux (2008–2011)
- (Guyana) Chanté Sandiford (2009–2011)
- (United States) Sam Mewis (2011–2014)
- (United States) Abby Dahlkemper (2011–2014)
- (New Zealand) Rosie White (2011–2014)
- (United States) Hailie Mace (2015–2018)
- (Mexico) Anika Rodríguez (2016–2019)
- (Canada) Jessie Fleming(2016–2019)
- (United States) Ashley Sanchez (2017–2019)
- (Mexico) Karina Rodríguez (2017–2021)
- (United States) Mia Fishel (2019–2021)
- (Mexico) Maricarmen Reyes (2018–2022)

Another notable Bruin is Mallory Swanson, who played just one season at UCLA before going professional. She is a starting forward on the U.S. women's national team as well as on the Chicago Red Stars in the National Women's Soccer League (NWSL).

== Head coaches ==
- 1993–1997 : Joy Fawcett
- 1998 : Todd Saldana
- 1999–2010 : Jill Ellis
- 2011–2012 : B. J. Snow
- 2013–2021 : Amanda Cromwell
- 2021–2025 : Margueritte Aozasa
- 2026 : Gof Boyoko
