= 2004 NCAA Division I women's soccer tournament =

2004 NCAA women's soccer tournament
Women's College Cup (semifinals & final)

Tournament details
- Country: United States
- Dates: November 11 – December 5, 2004
- Teams: 64

Final positions
- Champions: Notre Dame Fighting Irish (2nd title, 7th College Cup)
- Runners-up: UCLA Bruins (2nd title match, 3rd College Cup)
- Semifinalists: Princeton Tigers (1st College Cup); Santa Clara Broncos (10th College Cup)

Tournament statistics
- Matches played: 63
- Goals scored: 178 (2.83 per match)
- Attendance: 56,401 (895 per match)
- Top goal scorer(s): Katie Thorlakson, ND (4G, 6A)

Awards
- Best player: Katie Thorlakson, ND (Offensive); Erika Bohn, ND (Defensive)

The 2004 NCAA Division I women's soccer tournament (also known as the 2004 Women's College Cup) was the 23rd annual single-elimination tournament to determine the national champion of NCAA Division I women's collegiate soccer. The semifinals and championship game were played at SAS Soccer Park in Cary, North Carolina from December 3–5, 2004.

Notre Dame defeated UCLA in the final, 4–3 (in a penalty kick shootout), to win their second national title. The game previously ended 1–1 after regulation and two overtime periods.

This tournament was notable for being the first in which North Carolina failed to qualify for the College Cup semifinals. The top-seeded Tar Heels lost in the Third Round to semifinalist Santa Clara.

The most outstanding offensive player was Katie Thorlakson from Notre Dame, and the most outstanding defensive player was Erika Bohn, also from Notre Dame. Thorlakson and Bohn, alongside nine other players, were named to the All-Tournament team. This was also the first All-Tournament team without a single player from North Carolina.

Thorlakson was also the tournament's leading scorer, with 4 goals and 6 assists.

== Qualification ==
All Division I women's soccer programs were eligible to qualify for the tournament. The tournament field remained fixed at 64 teams.

== Format ==
Just as before, the final two rounds, deemed the Women's College Cup, were played at a pre-determined neutral site. All other rounds were played on campus sites at the home field of the higher-seeded team. The only exceptions were the first two rounds, which were played at regional campus sites. The top sixteen teams, all of which were seeded for the first time ever, hosted four team-regionals on their home fields during the tournament's first weekend.

=== Records ===
North Carolina Regional
Seed	School	Conference	Berth Type	Record
	Cal Poly	Big West	Automatic	11–2–6
	California	Pac-10	At-large	11–5–3
	Campbell	Atlantic Sun	Automatic	11–1–7
	Creighton	Missouri Valley	Automatic	08–7–4
	Illinois	Big Ten	At-large	13–5–2
8	Kansas	Big 12	At-large	17–4
	Nebraska	Big 12	At-large	12–8
1	North Carolina	ACC	At-large	18–0–2
	Oral Roberts	Mid-Continent	Automatic	13–5–1
	Rice	WAC	At-large	14–4–3
16	Santa Clara	West Coast	Auto (shared)	14–4–2
	Stanford	Pac-10	At-large	12–5–3
9	Texas A&M	Big 12	Automatic	17–5
	Texas State	Southland	Automatic	13–9
	Virginia Tech	ACC	At-large	11–8
	William & Mary	CAA	At-large	11–6–4

Virginia Regional
Seed	School	Conference	Berth Type	Record
	Bowling Green	MAC	Automatic	10–11–2
	Detroit	Horizon	Automatic	13–7–1
	Duke	ACC	At-large	13–7
	Furman	Southern	Automatic	13–8
	James Madison	CAA	At-large	11–7–3
	Michigan	Big Ten	At-large	11–8–2
6	Ohio State	Big Ten	Automatic	16–3–3
	Pepperdine	West Coast	At-large	09–6–3
	San Diego	West Coast	At-large	11–7–2
11	Tennessee	SEC	At-large	15–4–2
	UAB	Conference USA	Automatic	15–5–1
14	UCLA	Pac-10	Auto (shared)	13–6
	UNLV	Mountain West	At-large	12–4–2
	VCU	CAA	Automatic	15–6
3	Virginia	ACC	Automatic	16–2–2
	Wake Forest	ACC	At-large	10–6–2

Notre Dame Regional
Seed	School	Conference	Berth Type	Record
13	Arizona	Pac-10	Auto (shared)	15–5
	Colgate	Patriot	Automatic	12–6–2
	Colorado	Big 12	At-large	14–5–2
	Connecticut	Big East	Automatic	16–6–1
	Dayton	Atlantic 10	Automatic	20–1
	Eastern Illinois	Ohio Valley	Automatic	13–5–2
	Harvard	Ivy League	At-large	08–6–2
	North Texas	Sun Belt	Automatic	15–5–1
4	Notre Dame	Big East	At-large	19–1–1
5	Portland	West Coast	Auto (shared)	17–3
	SMU	WAC	Automatic	15–3–3
12	Texas	Big 12	At-large	13–6–2
	Utah	Mountain West	Automatic	13–5–3
	Weber State	Big Sky	Automatic	08–9–2
	West Virginia	Big East	At-large	14–5
	Wisconsin	Big Ten	At-large	15–5–1

Penn State Regional
Seed	School	Conference	Berth Type	Record
	Auburn	SEC	At-large	14–3–2
	Binghamton	America East	Automatic	14–5–1
	Birmingham-Southern	Big South	Automatic	12–6–3
	Boston College	Big East	At-large	14–6
	Central Conn. State	Northeast	Automatic	11–9–1
	Clemson	ACC	At-large	10–7–2
10	Florida	SEC	Automatic	16–3–3
	Florida State	ACC	At-large	12–5–2
	Loyola (MD)	MAAC	Automatic	16–3
	Maryland	ACC	At-large	07–6–4
2	Penn State	Big Ten	At-large	18–2–1
7	Princeton	Ivy League	Automatic	15–2
	UCF	Atlantic Sun	At-large	16–3–2
	Villanova	Big East	At-large	13–5–2
15	Washington	Pac-10	At-large	14–4–1
	Yale	Ivy League	At-large	13–4

== Bracket ==
=== Bracket No. 1 ===
First round November 11–12; Regional Campus Sites
1	North Carolina	6
Campbell	0
Fetzer Field • Chapel Hill, NC
William & Mary	2
Virginia Tech	1
Cal Poly	0
Stanford	2
Buck Shaw Stadium • Santa Clara, CA
California	1
16	Santa Clara	2
9	Texas A&M	10
Texas State	0
Aggie Soccer Complex • College Station, TX
Illinois	2
Rice	0
Nebraska	3
Oral Roberts	0
Jayhawk Soccer Complex • Lawrence, KS
8	Kansas	3
Creighton	1

Second round November 13–14; Regional Campus Sites
1	North Carolina	6
William & Mary	0
Stanford	0
16	Santa Clara (2OT)	1
9	Texas A&M	1
Illinois	2
Nebraska (OT)	2
8	Kansas	1

Third Round; November 19–21; Campus Sites
1	North Carolina*	0
16	Santa Clara (OT)	1
Illinois*	2
Nebraska	1

Quarterfinals; November 26–27; Campus Sites
16	Santa Clara*	2
Illinois	0

=== Bracket No. 2 ===
First round November 11–12; Regional Campus Sites
5	Portland	3
Weber State	0
Merlo Field • Portland, OR
Colorado	3
Utah	0
West Virginia	2
SMU	1
Mike A. Myers Stadium • Austin, TX
North Texas	0
12	Texas	3
13	Arizona	0
Colgate	1
Morrone Stadium • Storrs, CT
Harvard	1
Connecticut	2
Dayton	1
Wisconsin (OT)	2
Alumni Field • South Bend, IN
4	Notre Dame	4
Eastern Illinois	0

Second round November 13–14; Regional Campus Sites
5	Portland	3
Colorado	0
West Virginia	1
12	Texas	2
Colgate	0
Connecticut	1
Wisconsin	0
4	Notre Dame	1

Third Round; November 19–21; Campus Sites
5	Portland*	2
12	Texas	0
Connecticut	0
4	Notre Dame*	2

Quarterfinals; November 26–27; Campus Sites
5	Portland	1
4	Notre Dame*	3

=== Bracket No. 3 ===
First round November 11–12; Regional Campus Sites
3	Virginia	6
James Madison	0
Klöckner Stadium • Charlottesville, VA
Duke	2
VCU	1
San Diego (OT)	1
UNLV	0
Drake Stadium • Los Angeles, CA
Pepperdine	0
14	UCLA	1
11	Tennessee	2
Furman	0
UT Soccer Complex • Knoxville, TN
Wake Forest	0
UAB	2
Detroit	3
Michigan	2
Jesse Owens Memorial Stadium • Columbus, OH
6	Ohio State	2
Bowling Green	0

Second round November 13–14; Regional Campus Sites
3	Virginia	0
Duke	3
San Diego	0
14	UCLA	3
11	Tennessee	1
UAB	0
Detroit	0
6	Ohio State	3

Third Round; November 19–21; Campus Sites
Duke	0
14	UCLA*	2
11	Tennessee	0
6	Ohio State*	1

Quarterfinals; November 26–27; Campus Sites
14	UCLA	1
6	Ohio State*	0

=== Bracket No. 4 ===
First round November 11–12; Regional Campus Sites
7	Princeton	5
Central Connecticut	0
Lourie-Love Field • Princeton, NJ
Yale	1
Villanova	2
Florida State	0
Boston College (2OT)	1
James G. Pressly Stadium • Gainesville, FL
Central Florida	3
10	Florida	2
15	Washington	5
Birmingham–Southern	0
AU Soccer Complex • Auburn, AL
Clemson	0
Auburn	2
Loyola–Maryland	0
Maryland	3
Jeffrey Field • State College, PA
2	Penn State	6
Binghamton	1

Second round November 13–14; Regional Campus Sites
7	Princeton (2OT)	1
Villanova	0
Boston College	2
Central Florida	1
15	Washington	1
Auburn	0
Maryland	1
2	Penn State	0

Third Round; November 19–21; Campus Sites
7	Princeton*	2
Boston College	0
15	Washington*	1
Maryland	0

Quarterfinals; November 26–27; Campus Sites
7	Princeton*	3
15	Washington	1

=== College Cup ===
Semifinals; December 3 SAS Soccer Park; Cary, North Carolina
16	Santa Clara	0
4	Notre Dame	1
14	UCLA	2
7	Princeton	0

Championship; December 5 SAS Soccer Park; Cary, North Carolina
4	Notre Dame	1(4)
14	UCLA	1(3)

== All-tournament team ==
- Danesha Adams, UCLA
- Kendal Billingsley, UCLA
- Erika Bohn, Notre Dame (most outstanding defensive player)
- Candace Chapman, Notre Dame
- Bristyn Davis, UCLA
- Valerie Henderson, UCLA
- Iris Mora, UCLA
- Leslie Osborne, Santa Clara
- Melissa Tancredi, Notre Dame
- Katie Thorlakson, Notre Dame (most outstanding offensive player)
- Romy Trigg Smith, Princeton

== See also ==
- NCAA Women's Soccer Championships (Division II, Division III)
- NCAA Men's Soccer Championships (Division I, Division II, Division III)
