= 2007 NCAA Division I women's soccer tournament =

2007 NCAA women's soccer tournament
Women's College Cup (semifinals & final)

Tournament details
- Country: United States
- Dates: November 15th–December 9th, 2007
- Teams: 64

Final positions
- Champions: USC Trojans (1st title, 1st College Cup)
- Runners-up: Florida State Seminoles (1st title match, 4th College Cup)
- Semifinalists: Notre Dame Fighting Irish (9th College Cup); UCLA Bruins (5th College Cup)

Tournament statistics
- Matches played: 63
- Goals scored: 190 (3.02 per match)
- Attendance: 61,019 (969 per match)
- Top goal scorer(s): Sanna Talonen, FSU (8G, 1A)

Awards
- Best player: Offensive–Amy Rodriguez (USC); Defensive–Kristin Olsen (USC)

The 2007 NCAA Division I women's soccer tournament (also known as the 2007 Women's College Cup) was the 26th annual single-elimination tournament to determine the national champion of NCAA Division I women's collegiate soccer. The semifinals and championship game were played at Aggie Soccer Complex in College Station, Texas, from December 7–9, 2007 while the preceding rounds were played at various sites across the country from November 15–30.

USC defeated Florida State in the final, 2–0, to win their first national title. Both teams were making their first appearances in the tournament final while USC managed to become the first program since Florida in 1998 to win the College Cup in the first ever appearance. The Trojans (20–3–2) were coached by Ali Khosroshahin.

The most outstanding offensive player was Amy Rodriguez from USC, and the most outstanding defensive player was Kristin Olsen, also from USC. Rodriguez and Olsen, alongside nine other players, were named to the All-Tournament team.

The tournament's leading scorer, with 8 goals and 1 assist, was Sanna Talonen from Florida State.

== Qualification ==
All Division I women's soccer programs were eligible to qualify for the tournament. The tournament field remained fixed at 64 teams.

== Format ==
Just as before, the final two rounds, deemed the Women's College Cup, were played at a pre-determined neutral site. All other rounds were played on campus sites at the home field of the higher-seeded team. The only exceptions were the first two rounds, which were played at regional campus sites. The top sixteen teams hosted four team-regionals on their home fields (with some exceptions, noted below) during the tournament's first weekend.

=== National seeds ===
#1 Seeds	#2 Seeds	#3 Seeds	#4 Seeds
North Carolina (17–3–1); Penn State (16–3–2); Stanford (14–2–4); UCLA (16–1–2)	Portland (15–3–0); Purdue (19–2–2); USC (14–3–2); Texas A&M (17–3–2)	Florida (16–4–2); Florida State (13–5–3); Georgia (17–3–2); Tennessee (13–4–2)	Notre Dame (15–4–2); Virginia (11–3–6); Wake Forest (12–6–3); West Virginia (15–4–2)

=== Records ===
North Carolina Regional
Seed	School	Conference	Berth Type	Record
	Alabama A&M	SWAC	Automatic	10-6-3
	Duke	ACC	At-large	08-5-6
3	Georgia	SEC	At-large	17-3-2
	High Point	Big South	Automatic	11-7-3
	Illinois	Big Ten	At-large	11-6-2
	Indiana	Big Ten	At-large	12-6-2
	Louisville	Big East	At-large	13-5-2
	Loyola (IL)	Horizon	Automatic	14-8-1
	Memphis	Conference USA	Automatic	17-3-1
1	North Carolina	ACC	Automatic	17-3-1
4	Notre Dame	Big East	At-large	15-4-2
	Oakland	Summit	Automatic	10-7-2
2	Purdue	Big Ten	Automatic	19-2-2
	South Carolina	SEC	At-large	14-6-2
	Toledo	MAC	Automatic	14-5-3
	UNC-Greensboro	Southern	At-large	15-4-1

Penn State Regional
Seed	School	Conference	Berth Type	Record
	Auburn	SEC	At-large	10-7-2
	Creighton	Missouri Valley	Automatic	11-7-2
3	Florida	SEC	Automatic	16-4-2
	Hofstra	CAA	Automatic	17-3
	James Madison	CAA	At-large	16-4-1
	Miami (FL)	ACC	At-large	09-6-5
	Missouri	Big 12	At-large	13-7
	Monmouth	Northeast	Automatic	12-4-4
	Navy	Patriot	Automatic	14-4-4
	Ohio State	Big Ten	At-large	12-9-1
	Penn	Ivy League	Automatic	13-3-1
1	Penn State	Big Ten	At-large	16-3-2
	Southeast Missouri State	Ohio Valley	Automatic	12-2-3
	UCF	Conference USA	At-large	14-4-3
2	USC	Pac-10	At-large	14-3-2
4	West Virginia	Big East	Automatic	15-4-2

Stanford Regional
Seed	School	Conference	Berth Type	Record
	Boston College	ACC	At-large	11-5-3
	Boston University	America East	Automatic	11-6-3
	BYU	Mountain West	Automatic	17-3-2
	California	Pac-10	At-large	14-5
	Connecticut	Big East	At-large	12-5-1
3	Florida State	ACC	At-large	13-5-3
	Kennesaw State	Atlantic Sun	Automatic	17-3
	LSU	SEC	At-large	11-4-7
	Sacramento State	Big Sky	Automatic	11-3-5
	Samford	Ohio Valley	At-large	15-4-1
	Santa Clara	West Coast	At-large	12-5-3
1	Stanford	Pac-10	At-large	14-2-4
	Stephen F. Austin	Southland	Automatic	13-4-2
	Texas	Big 12	Automatic	14-3-5
2	Texas A&M	Big 12	At-large	17-3-2
4	Wake Forest	ACC	At-large	12-6-3

UCLA Regional
Seed	School	Conference	Berth Type	Record
	Cal State Fullerton	Big West	Automatic	12-7-2
	Charlotte	Atlantic 10	Automatic	16-4-1
	Clemson	ACC	At-large	09-5-5
	Colorado	Big 12	At-large	09-7-4
	Denver	Sun Belt	Automatic	13-4-4
	Furman	Southern	Automatic	16-5-1
	Georgetown	Big East	At-large	14-7
	Hawaii	WAC	Automatic	15-4-2
	Loyola (MD)	MAAC	Automatic	10-5-5
	Oklahoma State	Big 12	At-large	13-5-3
2	Portland	West Coast	Automatic	15-3
	San Diego	West Coast	At-large	15-2-3
3	Tennessee	SEC	At-large	13-4-2
1	UCLA	Pac-10	Automatic	16-1-2
4	Virginia	ACC	At-large	11-3-6
	William & Mary	CAA	At-large	14-4-2

== Bracket ==
=== North Carolina Bracket ===
First round November 15–16; Regional Campus Sites
1	North Carolina	6
High Point	1
Fetzer Field • Chapel Hill, NC
Memphis	0
UNC Greensboro	1
Louisville	0
Illinois (OT)	1
Alumni Field • Notre Dame, IN
Loyola–Chicago	0
4	Notre Dame	3
3	Georgia	6
Alabama A&M	1
Turner Soccer Complex • Athens, GA
South Carolina	1(1)
Duke (2OT, PSO)	1(4)
Indiana (2OT)	3
Toledo	2
Varsity Soccer Complex • West Lafayette, IN
2	Purdue	4
Oakland	0

Second round November 17–19; Regional Campus Sites
1	North Carolina	3
UNC Greensboro	1
Illinois	0
4	Notre Dame	2
3	Georgia	0
Duke	1
Indiana	0(4)
2	Purdue	0(3)

Round of 16; November 23–25; Campus Sites
1	North Carolina	2
4	Notre Dame	3
Duke	2
Indiana	0

Quarterfinals; November 30; Campus Sites
4	Notre Dame	3
Duke	2

=== Stanford Bracket ===
First round November 15–16; Regional Campus Sites
2	Texas A&M	4
Stephen F. Austin	1
Aggie Soccer Complex • College Station, TX
BYU	0
Texas	2
LSU (2OT)	2
Samford	1
Seminole Soccer Complex • Tallahassee, FL
Kennesaw State	0
3	Florida State	3
4	Wake Forest	2
Boston University	1
Newton Soccer Complex • Newton, MA
Connecticut (2OT, PSO)	0(5)
Boston College	0(4)
Santa Clara	0
California	2
Maloney Field • Stanford, CA
Sacramento State	0
1	Stanford	7

Second round November 17–19; Regional Campus Sites
2	Texas A&M	2
Texas	3
LSU	0
3	Florida State	4
4	Wake Forest	0
Connecticut	2
California	1(7)
1	Stanford (2OT, PSO)	1(8)

Round of 16; November 23–25; Campus Sites
Texas	0
3	Florida State	4
Connecticut	2
1	Stanford	0

Quarterfinals; November 30; Campus Sites
3	Florida State (2OT)	3
Connecticut	2

=== Penn State Bracket ===
First round November 15–16; Regional Campus Sites
1	Penn State	4
Monmouth	0
Jeffrey Field • University Park, PA
Hofstra	1
Ohio State	0
James Madison	2
Penn	0
Mountaineer Soccer Complex • Morgantown, WV
Navy	0
4	West Virginia	4
3	Florida	3
Miami (FL)	0
Pressly Stadium • Gainesville, FL
Auburn	1
UCF	3
Missouri (2OT, PSO)	1(2)
Southeast Missouri State	1(0)
Walton Stadium • Columbia, MO
2	USC	3
Creighton	0

Second round November 17–19; Regional Campus Sites
1	Penn State (2OT)	2
Hofstra	1
James Madison	0
4	West Virginia	2
3	Florida	0(4)
UCF	0(3)
Missouri	1
2	USC (2OT)	2

Round of 16; November 23–25; Campus Sites
1	Penn State	0
4	West Virginia	1
3	Florida	0
2	USC	1

Quarterfinals; November 30; Campus Sites
4	West Virginia	0
2	USC	1

=== UCLA Bracket ===
First round November 15–16; Regional Campus Sites
2	Portland	5
Denver	0
Merlo Field • Portland, OR
Hawaiʻi	0
Colorado	2
Charlotte	2
Clemson	4
UT Soccer Complex • Knoxville, TN
Furman	0
3	Tennessee	2
4	Virginia	4
Loyola–Maryland	1
Klöckner Stadium • Charlottesville, VA
Georgetown	1
William & Mary	2
San Diego	1
Oklahoma State	2
Drake Stadium • Los Angeles, CA
1	UCLA	3
Cal State Fullerton	1

Second round November 17–19; Regional Campus Sites
2	Portland	1
Colorado	0
Clemson	0
3	Tennessee (2OT)	1
4	Virginia	1
William & Mary	0
Oklahoma State	0
1	UCLA	4

Round of 16; November 23–25; Campus Sites
2	Portland	3
3	Tennessee	0
4	Virginia	1
1	UCLA (2OT)	2

Quarterfinals; November 30; Campus Sites
2	Portland	2
1	UCLA (2OT)	3

=== College Cup ===
Semifinals; December 7 Aggie Soccer Stadium; College Station, Texas
4	Notre Dame	2
3	Florida State	3
2	USC	2
1	UCLA	1

Championship; December 9 Aggie Soccer Stadium; College Station, Texas
3	Florida State	0
2	USC	2

== All-tournament team ==
- Amy Rodriguez, USC (most outstanding offensive player)
- Kristin Olsen, USC (most outstanding defensive player)
- Lauren Cheney, UCLA
- Janessa Currier, USC
- Amanda DaCosta, Florida State
- Christina DiMartino, UCLA
- Kerri Hanks, Notre Dame
- Kasey Johnson, USC
- (Finland) Sanna Talonen, Florida State
- Marihelen Tomer, USC
- (Japan) Mami Yamaguchi, Florida State

== See also ==
- NCAA Women's Soccer Championships (Division II, Division III)
- NCAA Men's Soccer Championships (Division I, Division II, Division III)
