= 2006 NCAA Division I women's soccer tournament =

2006 NCAA women's soccer tournament
Women's College Cup (semifinals & final)

Tournament details
- Country: United States
- Dates: November 8 – December 3, 2006
- Teams: 64

Final positions
- Champions: North Carolina Tar Heels (18th title, 22nd College Cup)
- Runners-up: Notre Dame Fighting Irish (5th title match, 8th College Cup)
- Semifinalists: Florida State Seminoles (3rd College Cup); UCLA Bruins (5th College Cup)

Tournament statistics
- Matches played: 63
- Goals scored: 187 (2.97 per match)
- Attendance: 68,298 (1,084 per match)
- Top goal scorer(s): Kerri Hanks, ND (4G, 8A)

Awards
- Best player: Defensive–Robyn Gayle (UNC); Offensive–Heather O'Reilly (UNC)

The 2006 NCAA Division I women's soccer tournament (also known as the 2006 Women's College Cup) was the 25th annual single-elimination tournament to determine the national champion of NCAA Division I women's collegiate soccer. The semifinals and championship game were played at SAS Soccer Park in Cary, North Carolina from December 1–3, 2006 while the preceding rounds were played at various sites across the country from November 8–25.

North Carolina defeated Notre Dame in the final, 2–1, to win their eighteenth national title. This was a rematch of the 1994, 1996, and 1999 tournament finals, all won by the Tar Heels.

The most outstanding defensive player was Robyn Gayle from North Carolina, and the most outstanding offensive player was Heather O'Reilly, also from North Carolina. Gayle and O'Reilly, alongside nine other players, were named to the All-Tournament team.

The tournament's leading scorer, with 4 goals and 8 assists, was Kerri Hanks from Notre Dame.

== Qualification ==
All Division I women's soccer programs were eligible to qualify for the tournament. The tournament field remained fixed at 64 teams.

=== Pre-Tournament Top 25 ===
1. Notre Dame
2. North Carolina
3. Santa Clara
4. UCLA
5. Florida State

6. Texas
7. Portland
8. Texas A&M
9. Penn State
10. West Virginia

11. Oklahoma State
12. Wake Forest
13. Utah
14. Florida
15. Rutgers

16. Stanford
17. BYU
18. Villanova
19. Navy
20. Colorado

21. California
22. Illinois
23. Tennessee
24.
25. William & Mary

=== Records ===
North Carolina Regional
Seed	School	Conference	Berth Type	Record
	Duke	ACC	At-large	09–8–2
	Grambling State	SWAC	Automatic	09–6–2
	Louisville	Big East	At-large	13–4–2
	McNeese State	Southland	Automatic	10–6–2
	Navy	Patriot	Automatic	21–1
1	North Carolina	ACC	Automatic	21–1
	Old Dominion	CAA	Automatic	17–4–1
	SMU	Conference USA	At-large	16–4–1
4	Tennessee	SEC	At-large	11–6–3
2	Texas A&M	Big 12	At-large	14–5–1
	UAB	Conference USA	Automatic	08–11–1
	UNC-Asheville	Big South	Automatic	10–6–3
	Virginia	ACC	At-large	10–7–2
3	Wake Forest	ACC	At-large	15–5–1
	West Virginia	Big East	At-large	14–3–3
	William & Mary	CAA	At-large	16–1–3

Santa Clara Regional
Seed	School	Conference	Berth Type	Record
	Auburn	SEC	At-large	11–5–3
	California	Pac-10	At-large	11–4–5
	Clemson	ACC	At-large	11–7–2
	Drake	Missouri Valley	Automatic	12–5–2
2	Florida State	ACC	At-large	14–3–4
3	Illinois	Big Ten	At-large	14–7
	Jacksonville	Atlantic Sun	Automatic	11–9–1
	Nevada	WAC	Automatic	13–4–4
4	Oklahoma State	Big 12	At-large	16–3–2
	Saint Louis	Atlantic 10	Automatic	14–3–2
1	Santa Clara	West Coast	Automatic	15–4–1
	Southeast Missouri State	Ohio Valley	Automatic	10–7–2
	Stanford	Pac-10	At-large	13–6–1
	UNC-Greensboro	Southern	Automatic	13–7–2
	USC	Pac-10	At-large	10–4–5
	Vanderbilt	SEC	At-large	10–4–6

Texas Regional
Seed	School	Conference	Berth Type	Record
	BYU	Mountain West	At-large	13–2–4
	Cal State Fullerton	Big West	Automatic	11–7–2
	Columbia	Ivy League	Automatic	10–4–3
	Connecticut	Big East	At-large	10–7–3
3	Florida	SEC	At-large	13–5–4
	Idaho State	Big Sky	Automatic	10–8–1
	Long Island	Northeast	Automatic	13–7–1
	Loyola (IL)	Horizon	Automatic	14–6–3
	Loyola Marymount	West Coast	At-large	10–2–6
	Marquette	Big East	At-large	11–6–4
	Portland	West Coast	At-large	14–3–3
	Purdue	Big Ten	At-large	14–5–3
1	Texas	Big 12	Automatic	17–3–2
2	UCLA	Pac-10	Automatic	17–3
	UNLV	Mountain West	Automatic	09–10–3
4	Utah	Mountain West	At-large	15–4–1

Notre Dame Regional
Seed	School	Conference	Berth Type	Record
	Boston College	ACC	At-large	11–6–2
	Boston U.	America East	At-large	13–4–3
4	Colorado	Big 12	At-large	12–5–4
	Colorado College	Conference USA	At-large	15–5–1
	Denver	Sun Belt	Automatic	18–2–1
	Hartford	America East	Automatic	10–8–2
	Kentucky	SEC	Automatic	14–6–3
	Michigan	Big Ten	At-large	09–7–5
	Milwaukee	Horizon	At-large	16–3–1
	Niagara	MAAC	Automatic	12–6–1
1	Notre Dame	Big East	Automatic	20–0–1
	Oakland	Mid-Continent	Automatic	08–10–1
2	Penn State	Big Ten	Automatic	15–4–3
3	Rutgers	Big East	At-large	15–3–3
	Toledo	MAC	Automatic	09–8–4
	Villanova	Big East	At-large	15–3–2

== Format ==
Just as before, the final two rounds, deemed the Women's College Cup, were played at a pre-determined neutral site. All other rounds were played on campus sites at the home field of the higher-seeded team. The only exceptions were the first two rounds, which were played at regional campus sites. The top sixteen teams hosted four team-regionals on their home fields (with some exceptions, noted below) during the tournament's first weekend.

== Bracket ==
=== North Carolina Bracket ===
First round November 8–11; Regional Campus Sites
North Carolina	7
UNC Asheville	0
Fetzer Field • Chapel Hill, NC
Navy (2OT, PSO)	0(5)
William & Mary	0(4)
Duke (2OT, PSO)	0(6)
Louisville	0(5)
UT Soccer Complex • Knoxville, TN
Tennessee	4
UAB	0
Wake Forest	4
Old Dominion	0
Spry Stadium • Winston-Salem, NC
Virginia	2
West Virginia	0
SMU	2
McNeese State	0
Aggie Soccer Complex • College Station, TX
Texas A&M	5
Grambling State	0

Second round November 11–13; Regional Campus Sites
North Carolina	4
Navy	0
Duke	0(3)
Tennessee (2OT, PSO)	0(4)
Wake Forest	0
Virginia	2
SMU	0
Texas A&M	4

Third Round; November 17–19; Campus Sites
North Carolina*	6
Tennessee	2
Virginia	1
Texas A&M*	2

Quarterfinals; November 24–25; Campus Sites
North Carolina*	3
Texas A&M	2

=== Texas Bracket ===
First round November 8–11; Regional Campus Sites
UCLA	6
UNLV	1
Drake Stadium • Los Angeles, CA
Cal State Fullerton	3
Loyola Marymount	0
Marquette	3
Purdue	1
Valley Fields • Milwaukee, WI
Florida	2
Loyola–Chicago	0
Utah (2OT)	3
Idaho State	2
Ute Soccer Field • Salt Lake City, UT
Portland	2
BYU	1
Connecticut	2
Columbia	1
Morrone Stadium • Storrs, CT
Texas	4
Long Island	0

Second round November 11–13; Regional Campus Sites
UCLA	3
Cal State Fullerton	1
Marquette	0(3)
Florida (2OT, PSO)	0(4)
Utah	0
Portland	3
Connecticut	1(1)
Texas (2OT, PSO)	1(3)

Third Round; November 17–19; Campus Sites
UCLA*	3
Florida	2
Portland	2
Texas*	0

Quarterfinals; November 24–25; Campus Sites
UCLA*	2
Portland	1

=== Santa Clara Bracket ===
First round November 8–11; Regional Campus Sites
Santa Clara	0
USC	1
Buck Shaw Stadium • Santa Clara, CA
Stanford	2
Nevada	1
Clemson	1(4)
Vanderbilt	1(3)
Riggs Field • Clemson, SC
Oklahoma State	2
UNC Greensboro	0
Illinois	2
Southeast Missouri State	0
Hermann Stadium • St. Louis, MO
Saint Louis	2
Drake	0
California	3
Auburn	1
Seminole Soccer Complex • Tallahassee, FL
Florida State	6
Jacksonville	0

Second round November 11–13; Regional Campus Sites
USC	0
Stanford	2
Clemson (2OT, PSO)	0(4)
Oklahoma State	0(2)
Illinois	4
Saint Louis	1
California	1
Florida State	3

Third Round; November 17–19; Campus Sites
Stanford*	0(2)
Clemson	0(4)
Illinois	0
Florida State*	1

Quarterfinals; November 24–25; Campus Sites
Clemson	1
Florida State*	2

=== Notre Dame Bracket ===
First round November 8–11; Regional Campus Sites
Penn State	3
Niagara	1
Jeffrey Field • University Park, PA
Villanova	5
Toledo	1
Boston College	3
Boston University	0
Yurcak Field • Piscataway, NJ
Rutgers	2
Hartford	0
Colorado	2
Colorado College	1
Prentup Field • Boulder, CO
Denver	2
Kentucky	0
Wisconsin–Milwaukee	0(5)
Michigan	0(3)
Alumni Field • Notre Dame, IN
Notre Dame	7
Oakland	1

Second round November 11–13; Regional Campus Sites
Penn State	2
Villanova	0
Boston College (2OT, PSO)	0(4)
Rutgers	0(2)
Colorado	2
Denver	1
Wisconsin–Milwaukee	0
Notre Dame	1

Third Round; November 17–19; Campus Sites
Penn State*	1
Boston College	0
Colorado	0
Notre Dame*	3

Quarterfinals; November 24–25; Campus Sites
Penn State	0
Notre Dame*	4

=== College Cup ===
Semifinals; December 1 SAS Soccer Park; Cary, North Carolina
North Carolina	2
UCLA	1
Florida State	0
Notre Dame	2

Championship; December 3 SAS Soccer Park; Cary, North Carolina
North Carolina	2
Notre Dame	1

== All-tournament team ==
- Robyn Gayle, North Carolina (most outstanding defensive player)
- Heather O'Reilly, North Carolina (most outstanding offensive player)
- Kelly Rowland, Florida State
- India Trotter, Florida State
- Brittany Bock, Notre Dame
- Kerri Hanks, Notre Dame
- Jill Krivacek, Notre Dame
- Yael Averbuch, North Carolina
- Tobin Heath, North Carolina
- Casey Nogueira, North Carolina
- Kristi Eveland, North Carolina

== See also ==
- NCAA Women's Soccer Championships (Division II, Division III)
- NCAA Men's Soccer Championships (Division I, Division II, Division III)
