= Drake Stadium (UCLA) =

UCLA stadium

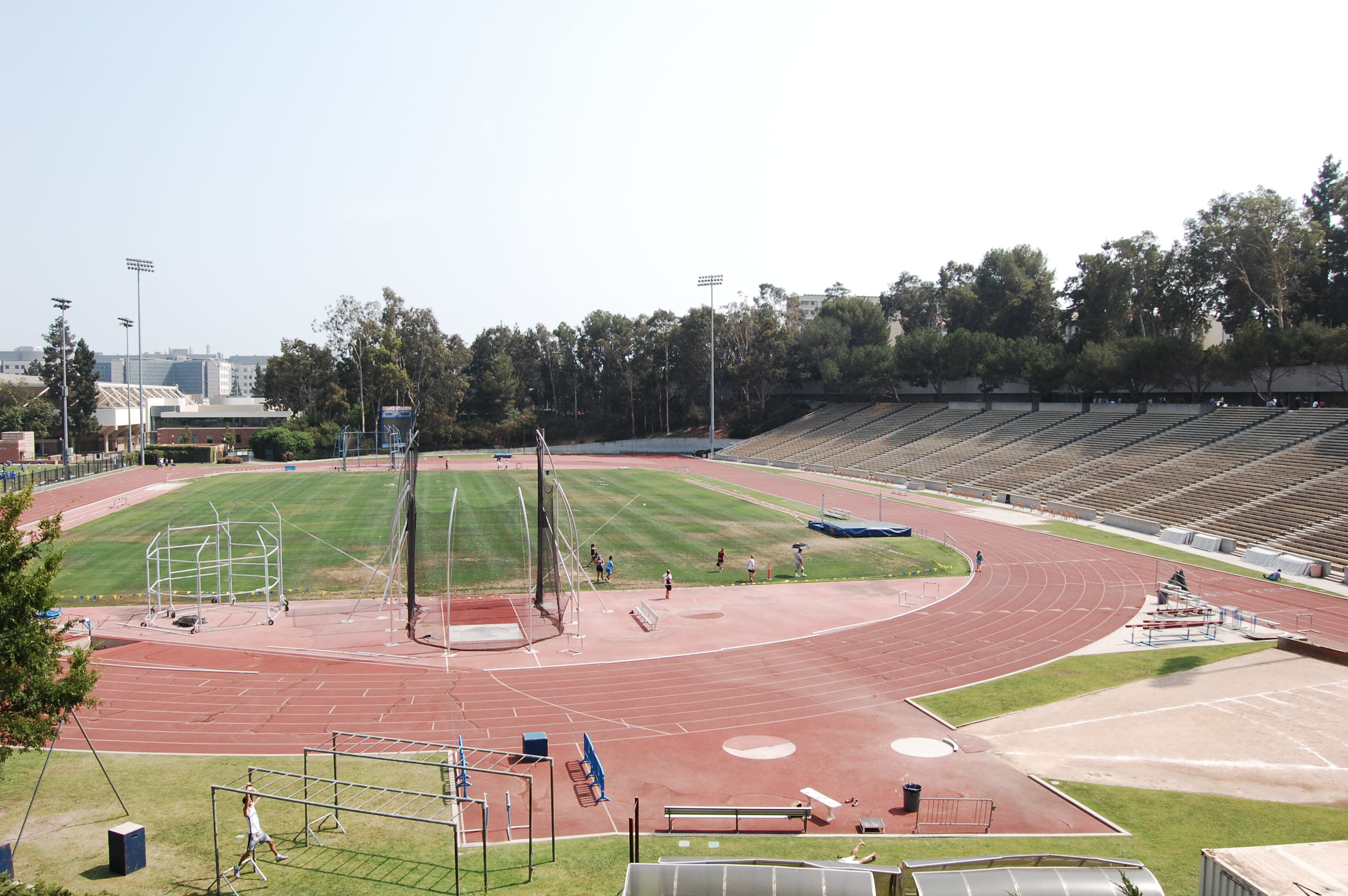
- View from north in 2008
- Interactive map of Drake Stadium
- Address: Los Angeles, California; United States
- Coordinates: 34.072°N 118.448°W
- Elevation: 400 ft (120 m)
- Owner: University of California, LA
- Operator: University of California, LA
- Capacity: 11,700
- Type: Stadium

Construction
- Opened: 1969; 57 years ago

Tenants
- UCLA Bruins teams: Track and field (1969–present); men's soccer (1969–2017); women's soccer (1969–2017)

Drake Stadium is an 11,700-capacity stadium in Los Angeles, California on the campus of the University of California, Los Angeles (UCLA). The home of the UCLA Bruins men's and women's track and field teams, it was built in 1969 and is named for UCLA track legend Elvin C. "Ducky" Drake, a student-athlete, track coach, and athletic trainer for over 60 years. Drake was also the home of the men's and women's soccer teams until 2017, when the nearby Wallis Annenberg Stadium opened.

== History ==
There was a proposal in 1965 to build a 44,000 seat "Multi-Purpose Stadium" on campus, for UCLA Bruins track meets and varsity football games, rather than the Bruins using the Los Angeles Memorial Coliseum for their home field. In both spring and fall 1965, UCLA students "voted by a two-to-one majority against the proposal to use fee funds to build a football stadium." Additionally, the proposal was opposed by influential area residents and politicians. By February 1966, UCLA had scaled back the project to the Drake Stadium configuration. Although the football stadium never became a reality, there have been scrimmage games in the stadium.

Drake Stadium has hosted the Pacific-10 (now Pac-12) Track and Field Championships, the USA Outdoor Track and Field Championships in 1976-77-78, the Pacific-8 Championships in 1970 and 1977 and the CIF California State Meet for high schools in 1969-71-77. The facility hosted the first-ever California-Nevada Championships on April 30-May 1, 1994. It also has hosted other student events such as concerts and graduation ceremonies.

The track at Drake Stadium is named for gold medalist Rafer Johnson and his wife Betty. The field is named for UCLA alumnus Frank Marshall, a film producer.

On May 20, 1990, Randy Barnes set the world record of 23.12 m (75 ft 10 in) in the Shot Put in Drake Stadium. The record lasted over 31 years until it was beaten by Ryan Crouser in Eugene, Oregon. On May 27, 2023, Crouser improved upon his world record with a 23.56 m (77 ft 3 1/2 in) at the Los Angeles Grand Prix, returning the record to Drake Stadium.

== Notable athletes ==
- Carlos Bocanegra
- Ato Boldon
- Jonathan Bornstein
- Tom Bradley
- Lauren Cheney
- Danny Everett
- Benny Feilhaber
- Dawn Harper
- Joanna Hayes
- Monique Henderson
- Florence Griffith-Joyner
- Jackie Joyner-Kersee
- Meb Keflezighi
- Rafer Johnson
- Cobi Jones
- Steve Lewis
- Mike Powell
- Jackie Robinson
- Mike Tully
- C.K. Yang
- Kevin Young
- Marvell Wynne
