= Audrey J. Walton Stadium (Columbia, Missouri) =

Stadium in Missouri, United States

Coordinates: 38.9359°N 92.3398°W

- Interactive map of Audrey J. Walton Stadium
- Full name: Audrey J. Walton Soccer Stadium
- Address: Columbia, MO; United States
- Owner: University of Missouri
- Operator: Univ. of Missouri Athletics
- Capacity: 2,500
- Type: Stadium
- Surface: Bermuda grass
- Scoreboard: yes
- Current use: Soccer; Track and field

Construction
- Opened: 1996; 30 years ago
- Renovated: 2001

Tenants
- Missouri Tigers (NCAA) teams: women's soccer; track and field

Website
- mutigers.com/soccer-stadium

Audrey J. Walton Soccer Stadium is a stadium located on the campus of the University of Missouri in Columbia, Missouri, United States. It serves as home of the Missouri Tigers women's soccer and track and field teams and the Missouri Relays track and field meet.

The stadium, opened in 1996, has a seating capacity of 2,500. Audrey J. Walton, the namesake of the stadium, was married to Sam Walton's brother, Bud Walton. Sam Walton is the founder of Wal-Mart and an alumnus of the university, donated $1 million to build the venue.
