= 2023 Racing Louisville FC season =

Racing Louisville FC 2023 soccer season

Racing Louisville FC
2023 season
- Chairman: John Neace
- General manager: Ryan Dell
- Head coach: Kim Björkegren
- Stadium: Lynn Family Stadium (capacity: 11,700)
- League: 9th
- Challenge Cup: Runners-up
- Playoffs: DNQ
- Top goalscorer: League: Savannah DeMelo (5); All: Savannah DeMelo (8)
- Highest home attendance: 10,214 (Aug. 19 vs. LA)
- Lowest home attendance: 4,143 (May 12 vs. CHI)
- Average home league attendance: 5,999
- Biggest win: 3–0 (May 12 vs. CHI)
- Biggest defeat: 0–2 (Apr 22 vs. POR)
Home colors	Away colors
- All statistics correct as of July 7, 2023.

The 2023 Racing Louisville FC season was the team's third as a professional women's soccer team. Racing played in the National Women's Soccer League (NWSL), the top tier of women's soccer in the United States.

== Background ==
=== Hirings ===
On November 23, 2022, Racing announced the hiring of former NWSL player Bev Yanez, previously of the NJ/NY Gotham FC coaching staff, as the club's top assistant coach. She replaced Louisville City FC academy director Mario Sanchez, who had served as interim head coach after the firing of head coach Christy Holly in 2021 and remained as interim assistant coach under Holly's permanent replacement Kim Björkegren.

On March 29, 2023, Racing announced the hiring of Ryan Dell, former administrator and operations manager of the United States women's national soccer team (USWNT), as Racing's first dedicated general manager. Dell was the second USWNT operations manager to become an NWSL general manager, following San Diego Wave FC's Molly Downtain.

Racing's soccer operations had previously been run by James O'Connor, president of Louisville City FC and Racing Louisville holding company Soccer Holdings, LLC, who moved to a business operations role for the parent company. The changes were made in part as a response to the 2021 NWSL abuse scandal, which included allegations from players of sexually and emotionally abusive behavior by former head coach Christy Holly. Dell reported directly to Soccer Holdings chairperson John Neace.

=== Kit changes ===
In March 2023, Racing announced new primary kits with a houndstooth pattern that referenced Secretariat owner Penny Chenery's houndstooth jackets, commemorating the 50th anniversary of Secretariat's Triple Crown victory.

== Stadium and facilities ==
Racing continued to play in Lynn Family Stadium, their full-time home since the team's inaugural season in 2021.

== Broadcasting ==
On April 12, Racing announced its first local broadcasting deal with local NBC affiliate WAVE, which would broadcast seven of the team's matches on its Circle TV network, promote the team, interview players, and provide game-day weather reports. The local broadcasts would carry separate feeds and feature commentary separate from the NWSL's national broadcast and streaming partners.

== Team ==
=== Staff ===
As of June 2, 2023.

style="text-align:left"|Sporting operations staff
General manager	Ryan Dell

style="text-align:left"|Technical staff
Head coach	Kim Björkegren
Assistant coach	Bev Yanez
Goalkeeping coach	Sergio Gonzalez

style="text-align:left"|Performance staff
Head of high performance	Julie Twaddle
Head athletic trainer	Tara Condon

=== Players ===
As of July 20, 2023.

First-team roster
No.	Pos.	Nation	Name	Birthday (age)	Since	Previous team	Notes
1	GK	(United States) USA	Katie Lund	November 27, 1996 (aged 26)	2021	(United States) TCU Horned Frogs	
18	GK	(United States) USA	Hillary Beall	January 27, 1999 (aged 24)	2022	(United States) Michigan Wolverines	
24	GK	(United States) USA	Jordyn Bloomer	October 14, 1997 (aged 25)	2022	(United States) Wisconsin Badgers	
99	GK	(United States) USA	Olivia Sekany	December 29, 1998 (aged 24)	2023	(United States) Washington Huskies	
3	DF	(United States) USA	Zaneta Wyne	August 3, 1990 (aged 32)	2022	(England) West Ham United	
4	DF	(Finland) FIN	Elli Pikkujämsä	October 24, 1999 (aged 23)	2021	(Sweden) KIF Örebro DFF	INT (Note: International player)
5	DF	(United States) USA	Paige Monaghan	November 13, 1996 (aged 26)	2023	(United States) NJ/NY Gotham FC	
12	DF	(United States) USA	Ella Shamburger	January 18, 2000 (aged 23)	2023	(United States) Vanderbilt Commodores	NTR (Note: NTR: Short-term national team replacement player signing.)
15	DF	(United States) USA	Julia Lester	January 16, 1998 (aged 25)	2022	(Cyprus) Apollon Ladies F.C.	
16	DF	(United States) USA	Carson Pickett	September 15, 1993 (aged 29)	2022	(United States) North Carolina Courage	
20	DF	(New Zealand) NZL	Abby Erceg	November 20, 1989 (aged 33)	2022	(United States) North Carolina Courage	
25	DF	(Northern Ireland) NIR	Rebecca Holloway	August 25, 1995 (aged 27)	2023	(England) Birmingham City	INT
44	DF	(Jamaica) JAM	Satara Murray	July 1, 1993 (aged 29)	2022	(England) Bristol City	
2	MF	(United States) USA	Lauren Milliet	December 1, 1996 (aged 26)	2021	(United States) North Carolina Courage	
6	MF	(United States) USA	Jaelin Howell	November 21, 1999 (aged 23)	2022	(United States) Florida State Seminoles	
7	MF	(United States) USA	Savannah DeMelo	March 26, 1998 (aged 24)	2022	(United States) USC Trojans	
8	MF	(Brazil) BRA	Ary Borges	December 28, 1999 (aged 23)	2023	(Brazil) Palmeiras	INT
9	MF	(United States) USA	Kayla Fischer	January 5, 2000 (aged 23)	2023	(United States) Ohio State Buckeyes	
17	MF	(United States) USA	Maddie Pokorny	November 24, 1996 (aged 26)	2023	(Denmark) HB Køge	NTR
19	MF	(United States) USA	Jordan Baggett	October 28, 1996 (aged 26)	2023	(United States) Washington Spirit	
26	MF	(United States) USA	Taylor Aylmer	September 23, 1998 (aged 24)	2023	(Finland) Åland United	NTR
27	MF	(Australia) AUS	Alex Chidiac	April 22, 1997 (aged 25)	2022	(Australia) Melbourne Victory FC	INT
77	MF	(China) CHN	Wang Shuang	January 23, 1995 (aged 28)	2022	(China) Wuhan Jianghan University F.C.	INT
	FW	(United States) USA	Riley Parker	March 31, 2000 (aged 22)	2023	(United States) Alabama Crimson Tide	
10	FW	(Denmark) DEN	Nadia Nadim	January 2, 1988 (aged 35)	2021	(France) Paris Saint-Germain	INT
11	FW	(South Africa) RSA	Thembi Kgatlana	May 2, 1996 (aged 26)	2022	(Spain) Atlético Madrid	INT
13	FW	(Bosnia and Herzegovina) BIH	Emina Ekic	June 6, 1999 (aged 23)	2021	(United States) Louisville Cardinals	
14	FW	(United States) USA	Jessica McDonald	February 28, 1988 (aged 35)	2022	(United States) North Carolina Courage	
21	FW	(United States) USA	Parker Goins	December 8, 1998 (aged 24)	2022	(United States) Arkansas Razorbacks	
22	FW	(United States) USA	Kirsten Davis	September 8, 1998 (aged 24)	2021	(United States) Texas Tech Red Raiders	
29	FW	(Nigeria) NGR	Uchenna Kanu	June 20, 1997 (aged 25)	2023	(Mexico) Tigres UANL	INT

== Competitions ==
Win Draw Loss

=== NWSL Challenge Cup ===
==== Group stage ====
May 17, 2023	Racing Louisville FC	3–2	Kansas City Current	Louisville, Kentucky
7:30 p.m. EDT (UTC−4)	DeMelo 25', 30'; Borges 86'	NWSL report ESPN report	Cooper 17'; Debinha 89'	Stadium: Lynn Family Stadium; Attendance: 4,303; Referee: Alexandra Billeter

May 31, 2023	Chicago Red Stars	0–2	Racing Louisville FC	Bridgeview, Illinois
7:00 p.m. EDT (UTC−5)	Roccaro (yellow card) 70'; St-Georges (yellow card) 78'	NWSL report ESPN report	Holloway (yellow card) 32'; Kanu 44' (Monaghan) (yellow card) 62'; Goins 71' (DeMelo)	Stadium: SeatGeek Stadium; Attendance: 1,762; Referee: Laura Rodriguez

June 14, 2023	Racing Louisville FC	3–0	Houston Dash	Louisville, Kentucky
8:00 p.m. EDT (UTC−4)	Kanu (yellow card) 8'; Fischer 45+4' (Borges); DeMelo 45+6' (Monaghan); Goins 73' (Pickett)	NWSL report ESPN report	Jennings (yellow card) 41'	Stadium: Lynn Family Stadium; Attendance: 4,983; Referee: JC Griggs

July 21, 2023	Racing Louisville FC	2–0	Chicago Red Stars	Louisville, Kentucky
8:00 p.m. EDT (UTC−4)	Baggett 11'; Monaghan 19'	NWSL report ESPN report		Stadium: Lynn Family Stadium; Attendance: 5,499; Referee: Nabil Bensalah

July 29, 2023	Houston Dash	1–0	Racing Louisville FC	Houston, Texas
7:30 p.m. EDT (UTC−5)	Salmon 26'	NWSL report ESPN report		Stadium: Shell Energy Stadium; Referee: Gerald Flores

August 5, 2023	Kansas City Current	3–0	Racing Louisville FC	Kansas City, Kansas
7:00 p.m. EDT (UTC−5)	Hamilton 3', 81'; Mace 90+1'	NWSL report ESPN report		Stadium: Children's Mercy Park; Attendance: 9,321; Referee: Jon Freemon
Note: Postponed from August 4.

==== Central Division standings ====
Pos	Team	Pld	W	T	L	GF	GA	GD	Pts	Qualification	KC	LOU	HOU	CHI
1	Kansas City Current	6	4	1	1	14	4	+10	13	Advance to knockout stage	—	3–0	3–1	4–0
2	Racing Louisville FC	6	4	0	2	10	6	+4	12	Advance to knockout stage based on ranking	3–2	—	3–0	2–0
3	Houston Dash	6	2	0	4	4	11	−7	6		0–2	1–0	—	2–0
4	Chicago Red Stars	6	1	1	4	3	10	−7	4		0–0	0–2	3–0	—

Source: NWSL

==== Results by matchday ====
Matchday	1	2	3	4	5	6
Stadium	H	A	H	H	A	A
Result	W	W	W	W	L	L
Position	1	1	1			2

Updated to match(es) played on August 5, 2023. Source: NWSL
A = Away; H = Home; W = Win; D = Draw; L = Loss

==== Knockout rounds ====
September 6, 2023 Semifinals	OL Reign	0–1	Racing Louisville FC	Seattle, Washington
7:00 p.m. PDT (UTC−7)		Report	Davis 28'; Holloway (yellow card) 34'; Kgatlana (yellow card) 62'	Stadium: Lumen Field; Attendance: 3,906; Referee: Natalie Simon

September 9, 2023 Finals	North Carolina Courage	2–0	Racing Louisville FC	Cary, North Carolina
12:30 p.m. EDT (UTC−4)	Kerolin 28'; Kurtz (yellow card) 45'; Matsukubo 54'	Report	DeMelo (yellow card) 73'	Stadium: WakeMed Soccer Park; Attendance: 3,068; Referee: Alex Billeter

=== Regular season ===
==== Matches ====
March 26, 2023 1	Houston Dash	0–0	Racing Louisville FC	Houston, Texas
6:00 p.m. CDT (UTC−5)	Anderson (yellow card) 15'; Jacobs (yellow card) 55'; Schmidt (yellow card) 58'; Viggiano (yellow card) 63'	NWSL report ESPN report	Borges (yellow card) 62'; Holloway (yellow card) 71'	Stadium: Shell Energy Stadium; Attendance: 5,722; Referee: Danielle Chesky

April 1, 2023 2	Racing Louisville FC	2–2	Washington Spirit	Louisville, Kentucky
3:00 p.m. EDT (UTC−4)	Erceg 46' (Wang); Borges 65'	NWSL report ESPN report	Hatch 16' (Bailey), 32' (Rodman); Metayer (yellow card) 83' (yellow-red card) 90+3'; Parsons (yellow card) 89'	Stadium: Lynn Family Stadium; Attendance: 4,861; Referee: Sergii Demianchuk

April 15, 2023 3	Angel City FC	2–2	Racing Louisville FC	Los Angeles, California
7:00 p.m. PDT (UTC−7)	Johnson 68' (McCaskill); McCaskill 87'	NWSL report ESPN report	DeMelo 3' (pen.) (yellow card) 77'; Davis 32' (DeMelo); Pikkujämsä (yellow card) 70'	Stadium: BMO Stadium; Attendance: 18,007; Referee: Brad Jensen

April 22, 2023 4	Portland Thorns FC	2–0	Racing Louisville FC	Portland, Oregon
7:30 p.m. PDT (UTC−7)	Sinclair; Weaver (yellow card) 28' (goal) 45+4' (Smith); Coffey (yellow card) 32'	NWSL report ESPN report	Borges (yellow card) 67'	Stadium: Providence Park; Attendance: 14,972; Referee: Thomas Snyder

April 29, 2023 5	Racing Louisville FC	2–2	OL Reign	Louisville, Kentucky
7:30 p.m. EDT (UTC−4)	Monaghan 7'; DeMelo (yellow card) 35' (yellow-red card) 73' (goal) 45'; Milliet (yellow card) 46'	NWSL report ESPN report	Rapinoe 69' (pen.); Huerta (yellow card) 71'; Stanton (yellow card) 87'; Huitema 90' (Cook)	Stadium: Lynn Family Stadium; Attendance: 6,185; Referee: Eric Tattersall

May 6, 2023 6	Orlando Pride	1–0	Racing Louisville FC	Orlando, Florida
7:00 p.m. EDT (UTC−4)	Bright 21' (Strom); Adriana (yellow card) 27'	NWSL report ESPN report	Howell (yellow card) 43'	Stadium: Exploria Stadium; Attendance: 5,106; Referee: Jeremy Scheer

May 12, 2023 7	Racing Louisville FC	3–0	Chicago Red Stars	Louisville, Kentucky
7:30 p.m. EDT (UTC−4)	Naeher 35' (o.g.); Wang 45+5' (pen.); Erceg (yellow card) 53'; Goins 89'; Howell (yellow card) 90'	NWSL report ESPN report	Bianchi (yellow card) 6'; St-Georges (yellow card) 28'	Stadium: Lynn Family Stadium; Attendance: 4,143; Referee: Alyssa Nichols

May 20, 2023 8	Kansas City Current	0–2	Racing Louisville FC	Kansas City, Kansas
7:00 p.m. CDT (UTC−5)	LaBonta (yellow card) 73'; DiBernardo (yellow card) 82'	NWSL report ESPN report	DeMelo 12'; Davis 27'; Howell (yellow card) 36'; Björkegren (yellow card) 61'	Stadium: Children's Mercy Park; Attendance: 10,603; Referee: Brad Jensen

May 27, 2023 9	Racing Louisville FC	1–2	North Carolina Courage	Louisville, Kentucky
7:30 p.m. EDT (UTC−4)	DeMelo (yellow card) 44'; Borges (yellow card) 73'; Baggett 88' (Milliet)	NWSL report ESPN report	Madsen 53' (Williams); Kerolin 60' (Miura); Gejl (yellow card) 77'; O'Sullivan (yellow card) 81'	Stadium: Lynn Family Stadium; Attendance: 5,874; Referee: Danielle Chesky

June 3, 2023 10	Washington Spirit	1–1	Racing Louisville FC	Washington, D.C.
8:00 p.m. EDT (UTC−4)	Rodman 3' (Hatch); Hatch (yellow card) 39'; Bailey (yellow card) 87'	NWSL report ESPN report	DeMelo (yellow card) 45' (goal) 51' (pen.); Pikkujämsä (red card) 77'; Kgatlana (yellow card) 90+8'	Stadium: Audi Field; Attendance: 8,515; Referee: Rebecca Pagan

June 9, 2023 11	Racing Louisville FC	0–0	San Diego Wave FC	Louisville, Kentucky
8:00 p.m. EDT (UTC−4)	Milliet (yellow card) 66'	NWSL report ESPN report	McNabb (yellow card) 43'; Shaw (yellow card) 44'; Pogarch (yellow card) 71'	Stadium: Lynn Family Stadium; Attendance: 6,753; Referee: Adorae Monroy

June 18, 2023 12	Racing Louisville FC	2–0	NJ/NY Gotham FC	Louisville, Kentucky
4:00 p.m. EDT (UTC−4)	DeMelo 23'; Kgatlana 46' (Davis); Pickett (yellow card) 78'	NWSL report ESPN report	Nighswonger (yellow card) 27'; Long (yellow card) 71'; Williams (yellow card) 89'	Stadium: Lynn Family Stadium; Attendance: 5,103; Referee: Rebecca Pagan

June 24, 2023 13	North Carolina Courage	1–0	Racing Louisville FC	Cary, North Carolina
7:00 p.m. EDT (UTC−4)	Lussi 73'; Kerolin (yellow card) 90+3'	NWSL report ESPN report	Kgatlana (yellow card) 46'; Howell (yellow card) 56'; Monaghan (yellow card) 81'	Stadium: WakeMed Soccer Park; Attendance: 4,041; Referee: Elton Garcia

July 1, 2023 14	OL Reign	2–2	Racing Louisville FC	Seattle, Washington
12:30 p.m. PDT (UTC−7)	McClernon (yellow card) 4'; Fishlock (yellow card) 23'; Stanton (yellow card) 53'; Latsko 82' (Bennett); Bennett 87' (Stanton)	NWSL report ESPN report	Wang 24' (pen.) (yellow card) 41'; Monaghan 76'; Pickett (yellow card) 88'	Stadium: Lumen Field; Attendance: 7,495; Referee: Alex Billeter

July 7, 2023 15	Racing Louisville FC	2–1	Kansas City Current	Louisville, Kentucky
8:00 p.m. EDT (UTC−4)	Pikkujämsä 20'; Monaghan 46' (Fischer)	NWSL report ESPN report	Cooper 7' (pen.) (yellow card) 83'; Ball (yellow card) 34'; Childers (yellow card) 89'	Stadium: Lynn Family Stadium; Attendance: 5,097; Referee: Anya Voigt

August 19, 2023 16	Racing Louisville FC	1–1	Angel City FC	Louisville, Kentucky
7:30 p.m. EDT (UTC−4)	Davis 79'	NWSL report ESPN report	Johnson 67'	Stadium: Lynn Family Stadium; Attendance: 10,214; Referee: Danielle Chesky

August 27, 2023 17	NJ/NY Gotham FC	0–0	Racing Louisville FC	Harrison, New Jersey
5:30 p.m. EDT (UTC−4)		NWSL report ESPN report		Stadium: Red Bull Arena; Attendance: 4,231; Referee: Anya Voigt

September 2, 2023 18	Racing Louisville FC	2–1	Portland Thorns FC	Louisville, Kentucky
7:30 p.m. EDT (UTC−4)	Erceg 60'; Kgatlana 64'	NWSL report ESPN report	Weaver 6'	Stadium: Lynn Family Stadium; Attendance: 5,778; Referee: Karen Callado

September 15, 2023 19	Racing Louisville FC	0–1	Houston Dash	Louisville, Kentucky
7:30 p.m. EDT (UTC−4)		NWSL report ESPN report	Ordóñez 54'	Stadium: Lynn Family Stadium; Attendance: 5,526; Referee: Elvis Osmanovic

September 30, 2023 20	Chicago Red Stars	1–0	Racing Louisville FC	Bridgeview, Illinois
7:00 p.m. CDT (UTC−5)	St-Georges 7'	NWSL report ESPN report		Stadium: SeatGeek Stadium; Attendance: 4,104; Referee: Sergii Demianchuk

October 6, 2023 21	Racing Louisville FC	3–2	Orlando Pride	Louisville, Kentucky
7:30 p.m. EDT (UTC−4)	Nadim 45+1' (pen.); Davis 70'; Moorhouse 74' (o.g.)	NWSL report ESPN report	Marta 17' (pen.); Abello 21'	Stadium: Lynn Family Stadium; Attendance: 6,455; Referee: Kevin Broadley

October 15, 2023 22	San Diego Wave FC	0–2	Racing Louisville FC	San Diego, California
2:00 p.m. PDT (UTC−7)	Shaw 26'; Morgan 47'	NWSL report ESPN report		Stadium: Snapdragon Stadium; Attendance: 30,312; Referee: Jeremy Scheer

==== Regular season standings ====
Pos	Team	Pld	W	D	L	GF	GA	GD	Pts
7	Orlando Pride	22	10	1	11	27	28	−1	31
8	Washington Spirit	22	7	9	6	26	29	−3	30
9	Racing Louisville FC	22	6	9	7	25	24	+1	27
10	Houston Dash	22	6	8	8	16	18	−2	26
11	Kansas City Current	22	8	2	12	30	36	−6	26

Source: NWSL
Rules for classification: Tiebreakers

==== Results summary ====
Overall								Home						Away					
Pld	W	D	L	GF	GA	GD	Pts	W	D	L	GF	GA	GD	W	D	L	GF	GA	GD
22	6	9	7	25	24	+1	27	5	4	2	18	12	+6	1	5	5	7	12	−5

Last updated: October 15, 2023.
Source: NWSLsoccer.com

==== Results by matchday ====
Matchday	1	2	3	4	5	6	7	8	9	10	11	12	13	14	15	16	17	18	19	20	21	22
Stadium	A	H	A	A	H	A	H	A	H	A	H	H	A	A	H	H	A	H	H	A	H	A
Result	D	D	D	L	D	L	W	W	L	D	D	W	L	D	W	D	D	W	L	L	W	L
Position	6	9	9	8	10	11	9	7	8	8	9	8	8	8	7	8	8	7	9	10	9	9

Updated to match(es) played on October 15, 2023. Source: NWSL
A = Away; H = Home; W = Win; D = Draw; L = Loss

== Statistics ==
As of matches played July 7, 2023.

style="text-align:left"|Goalscorers, per competition
Player					Goals by competition				
Rank	Pos.	No.	Nat.	Name	NWSL	Cup	Playoffs	Total	
1	MF	7	(United States) USA	Savannah DeMelo	5	3	—	8	
2	FW	21	(United States) USA	Parker Goins	1	2	—	3	
2	DF	5	(United States) USA	Paige Monaghan	3	0	—	3	
4	MF	8	(Brazil) BRA	Ary Borges	1	1	—	2	
4	FW	22	(United States) USA	Kirsten Davis	2	0	—	2	
4	FW	77	(China) CHN	Wang Shuang	2	0	—	2	
7	DF	20	(New Zealand) NZL	Abby Erceg	1	0	—	1	
7	FW	9	(United States) USA	Kayla Fischer	0	1	—	1	
7	FW	29	(Nigeria) NGR	Uchenna Kanu	0	1	—	1	
7	FW	11	(South Africa) RSA	Thembi Kgatlana	1	0	—	1	
7	MF	4	(Finland) FIN	Elli Pikkujämsä	1	0	—	1	
7	Total					17	8	—	25

style="text-align:left"|Assists by player, per competition
Player					Assists by competition			
Rank	Pos.	No.	Nat.	Name	NWSL	Cup	Playoffs	Total
1	MF	7	(United States) USA	Savannah DeMelo	2	1	—	3
2	DF	5	(United States) USA	Paige Monaghan	0	2	—	2
3	MF	19	(United States) USA	Jordan Baggett	0	1	—	1
3	MF	8	(Brazil) BRA	Ary Borges	0	1	—	1
3	FW	22	(United States) USA	Kirsten Davis	1	0	—	1
3	FW	9	(United States) USA	Kayla Fischer	1	0	—	1
3	DF	16	(United States) USA	Carson Pickett	0	1	—	1
3	FW	11	(South Africa) RSA	Thembi Kgatlana	0	1	—	1
3	DF	2	(United States) USA	Lauren Milliet	1	0	—	1
3	FW	77	(China) CHN	Wang Shuang	1	0	—	1
Total					6	7	—	13

style="text-align:left"|Clean sheets by goalkeeper, per competition
Player					Clean sheets by competition			
Rank	Pos.	No.	Nat.	Name	NWSL	Cup	Playoffs	Total
1	GK	1	(United States) USA	Katie Lund	5	2	—	7
Total					5	2	—	7

style="text-align:left"|Disciplinary cards by player, per competition
Player					NWSL		Cup		Playoffs		Total	
Rank	Pos.	No.	Nat.	Name	Booked	Sent off (straight red)	Booked	Sent off (straight red)	Booked	Sent off (straight red)	Booked	Sent off (straight red)
1	MF	7	(United States) USA	Savannah DeMelo	5	1	0	0	—		5	1
2	MF	8	(Brazil) BRA	Ary Borges	3	0	1	0	—		4	0
2	MF	6	(United States) USA	Jaelin Howell	4	0	0	0	—		4	0
4	FW	11	(South Africa) RSA	Thembi Kgatlana	2	0	1	0	—		3	0
4	DF	16	(United States) USA	Carson Pickett	3	0	0	0	—		3	0
6	DF	20	(New Zealand) NZL	Abby Erceg	1	0	1	0	—		2	0
6	FW	9	(United States) USA	Kayla Fischer	1	0	1	0	—		2	0
6	DF	25	(Northern Ireland) NIR	Rebecca Holloway	1	0	1	0	—		2	0
6	FW	29	(Nigeria) NGR	Uchenna Kanu	0	0	2	0	—		2	0
6	DF	2	(United States) USA	Lauren Milliet	2	0	0	0	—		2	0
6	MF	4	(Finland) FIN	Elli Pikkujämsä	1	1	0	0	—		1	1
12	DF	5	(United States) USA	Paige Monaghan	1	0	0	0	—		1	0
12	MF	77	(China) CHN	Wang Shuang	1	0	0	0	—		1	0
Total					25	2	7	0	—		32	2

== Awards ==
As of July 5, 2023.

=== NWSL monthly awards ===
Best XI of the Month
Month	Pos.	Nat.	Player	Ref.
May	MF	(United States) USA	Savannah DeMelo	
June	DF	(New Zealand) NZL	Abby Erceg	
June	MF	(United States) USA	Savannah DeMelo (2)	

=== NWSL weekly awards ===
Player of the Week
Wk.	Pos.	Nat.	Player	Won	Ref.
1	GK	(United States) USA	Katie Lund	Nom.	
2	MF	(Brazil) BRA	Ary Borges	Nom.	
3	MF	(United States) USA	Savannah DeMelo	Nom.	
7	MF	(China) CHN	Wang Shuang	Nom.	
8	MF	(United States) USA	Savannah DeMelo	Nom.	
12	MF	(United States) USA	Savannah DeMelo	Nom.	

Save of the Week
Wk.	Pos.	Nat.	Player	Won	Ref.
4	GK	(United States) USA	Katie Lund	Nom.	
8	GK	(United States) USA	Katie Lund	Nom.	
10	DF	(United States) USA	Carson Pickett	Nom.	

== Transactions ==
=== Draft selections ===
Draft selections are not automatically signed to the team roster. The 2023 NWSL Draft was held on January 12, 2023, in Philadelphia, Pennsylvania.

style="text-align:left"|2023 NWSL Draft selections, by round
Round	Pick	Pos.	Nat.	Player	College	Status	Ref.
2	16	FW	(United States) USA	Kayla Fischer	Ohio State University	Signed to a two-year contract on March 17, 2023.	
2	17	DF	(United States) USA	Brianna Martinez	University of Notre Dame	Not signed, rights waived.	
3	29	MF	(United States) USA	Jadyn Edwards	Ohio State University	Not signed, rights waived.	
3	31	FW	(United States) USA	Riley Parker	University of Alabama	Signed to a one-year contract with an option for an additional year.	

=== Contracts ===
style="text-align:left"|Contract expirations
Date	Pos.	Nat.	Player	Notes	Ref.
November 15, 2022	DF	(England) ENG	Gemma Bonner	Contract option mutually declined.	
November 15, 2022	DF	(United States) USA	Nealy Martin	Contract expired.	

style="text-align:left"|Contract re-signings
Date	Pos.	Nat.	Player	Notes	Ref.
November 15, 2022	GK	(United States) USA	Hillary Beall	Contract option exercised.	
November 15, 2022	GK	(United States) USA	Jordyn Bloomer	Contract option exercised.	
November 15, 2022	MF	(Australia) AUS	Alex Chidiac	Contract option exercised.	
November 15, 2022	MF	(United States) USA	Taylor Malham	Contract option exercised.	
November 15, 2022	FW	(United States) USA	Emina Ekic	Contract option exercised.	
November 15, 2022	FW	(United States) USA	Parker Goins	Contract option exercised.	
January 10, 2023	MF	(United States) USA	Jaelin Howell	Signed a contract extension for a third year through 2025.	
January 20, 2023	GK	(United States) USA	Katie Lund	Signed a three-year contract extension.	
February 6, 2023	DF	(United States) USA	Paige Monaghan	Signed a three-year contract extension.	
March 13, 2023	DF	(United States) USA	Carson Pickett	Signed a three-year contract extension.	

style="text-align:left"|Waivers
Date	Pos.	Nat.	Player	Notes	Ref.
February 18, 2023	DF	(United States) USA	Taylor Malham	Waived.	

=== Loans ===
style="text-align:left"|Loans out
Date	Pos.	Nat.	Player	Destination club	Fee/notes	Ref.
September 27, 2022	GK	(United States) USA	Hillary Beall	(Australia) Western United FC	Loaned through 2022–23 A-League Women season ending in April.	
October 16, 2022	GK	(United States) USA	Jordyn Bloomer	(Australia) Western Sydney Wanderers FC	Loaned through 2022–23 A-League Women season ending in April.	Loaned through 2022–23 A-League Women season ending in February.
October 18, 2022	FW	(United States) USA	Jessica McDonald	(Australia) Western United FC	Loaned through 2022–23 A-League Women season ending in April.	Loaned through 2022–23 A-League Women season ending in February.
October 20, 2022	MF	(Australia) AUS	Alex Chidiac	(Australia) Melbourne City FC	Loaned through 2022–23 A-League Women season ending in April.	Loaned through 2022–23 A-League Women season ending in February.
November 7, 2022	FW	(United States) USA	Emina Ekic	(Australia) Melbourne City FC		Loaned through 2022–23 A-League Women season ending in February.
February 2, 2023	FW	(United States) USA	Riley Parker	(Mexico) Tigres UANL	Loaned through 2022–23 Liga MX Femenil Clausura in June.	

=== Transfers ===
style="text-align:left"|Transfers in
Date	Pos.	Nat.	Player	Former club	Fee/notes	Ref.
December 9, 2022	DF	(Finland) FIN	Elli Pikkujämsä	(Sweden) KIF Örebro DFF	Signed to a two-year contract with a mutual option for a third year.	
December 23, 2022	MF	(Brazil) BRA	Ary Borges	(Brazil) Palmeiras	Signed to a three-year contract.	
January 12, 2023	DF	(United States) USA	Paige Monaghan	(United States) NJ/NY Gotham FC	Acquired with $150,000 in allocation money and an international roster slot for the 2023 season, in exchange for the fourth-overall pick in the 2023 NWSL Draft.	
January 23, 2023	DF	(New Zealand) NZL	Abby Erceg	(United States) North Carolina Courage	Acquired in exchange for Emily Fox.	
January 23, 2023	DF	(United States) USA	Carson Pickett	(United States) North Carolina Courage	Acquired in exchange for Emily Fox.	
February 2, 2023	FW	(Nigeria) NGR	Uchenna Kanu	(Mexico) Tigres UANL	Acquired for a $150,000 transfer fee paid with allocation money with an additional $30,000 fee if Kanu scores 12 or more goals during the 2023 NWSL season, and signed to a two-year contract with an option for a third year.	
April 25, 2023	MF	(United States) USA	Jordan Baggett	(United States) Washington Spirit	Acquired in exchange for a second-round pick and a conditional third-round pick in the 2024 NWSL Draft.	
April 25, 2023	MF	(United States) USA	Maddie Pokorny	(Denmark) HB Køge	Signed as a short-term national team replacement player.	
July 20, 2023	MF	(United States) USA	Taylor Aylmer	(Finland) Åland United	Signed as a short-term national team replacement player.	
July 20, 2023	DF	(United States) USA	Ella Shamburger	(United States) Vanderbilt Commodores	Signed as a short-term national team replacement player.	

style="text-align:left"|Transfers out
Date	Pos.	Nat.	Player	Destination club	Fee/notes	Ref.
January 23, 2023	DF	(United States) USA	Emily Fox	(United States) North Carolina Courage	Traded in exchange for Abby Erceg and Carson Pickett.	
March 25, 2023	FW	(United States) USA	Cheyna Matthews	(United States) Chicago Red Stars	Free-agent signing.	

=== Preseason trialists ===
Pos.	Nat.	Player	Previous club	Ref.
DF	(United States) USA	Abbey Burdette	(United States) University of Tennessee	
MF	(United States) USA	Ella Sanchez (Note: Under-18 player invitee)	(United States) Racing Louisville FC (USL W League)	
GK	(United States) USA	Olivia Sekany	(United States) University of Washington	
DF	(United States) USA	Trinity Watson	(United States) Pepperdine Waves	
