= Big 12 Conference women's soccer awards =

The Big 12 Conference presents several annual honors for the best women's soccer players of the season. The conference currently presents individual awards for Forward of the Year, Midfielder of the Year, Defender of the Year, Goalkeeper of the Year, and Freshman of the Year. It also presents an award for Coach of the Year.

== Key ==
*	Awarded a national player of the year award: Hermann Trophy (1988–present); Honda Sports Award (1988–present); TopDrawerSoccer National Player of the Year (2011–present)

== Player of the Year (1994–2003) ==
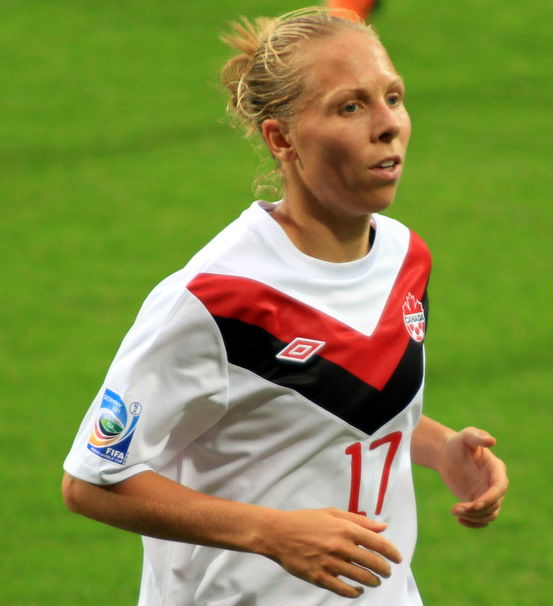
Brittany Timko, Nebraska, 3× Big 12 Player of the Year

Big 12 Conference Player of the Year
Season	Player	School	Position	Class	Ref.
1996	Bryn Blalack	Texas A&M	Forward	Junior	
1996	Kari Uppinghouse	Nebraska	Midfielder	Junior	
1997	Bryn Blalack (2)	Texas A&M	Midfielder	Senior	
1998	Kim Engesser	Nebraska	Forward	Senior	
1999	Sharolta Nonen	Nebraska	Defender	Senior	
2000	Christine Latham	Nebraska	Forward	Sophomore	
2001	Christine Latham (2)	Nebraska	Forward	Junior	
2002	Kelly Wilson	Texas	Forward	Sophomore	
2003	Fran Munnelly	Colorado	Midfielder	Sophomore	
2004	Brittany Timko	Nebraska	Forward	Sophomore	
2005	Brittany Timko (3)	Nebraska	Forward	Junior	
2006	Brittany Timko (3)	Nebraska	Forward	Senior	
2006	Yolanda Odenyo	Oklahoma State	Midfielder	Junior	

== Offensive Player of the Year (2007–2022) ==
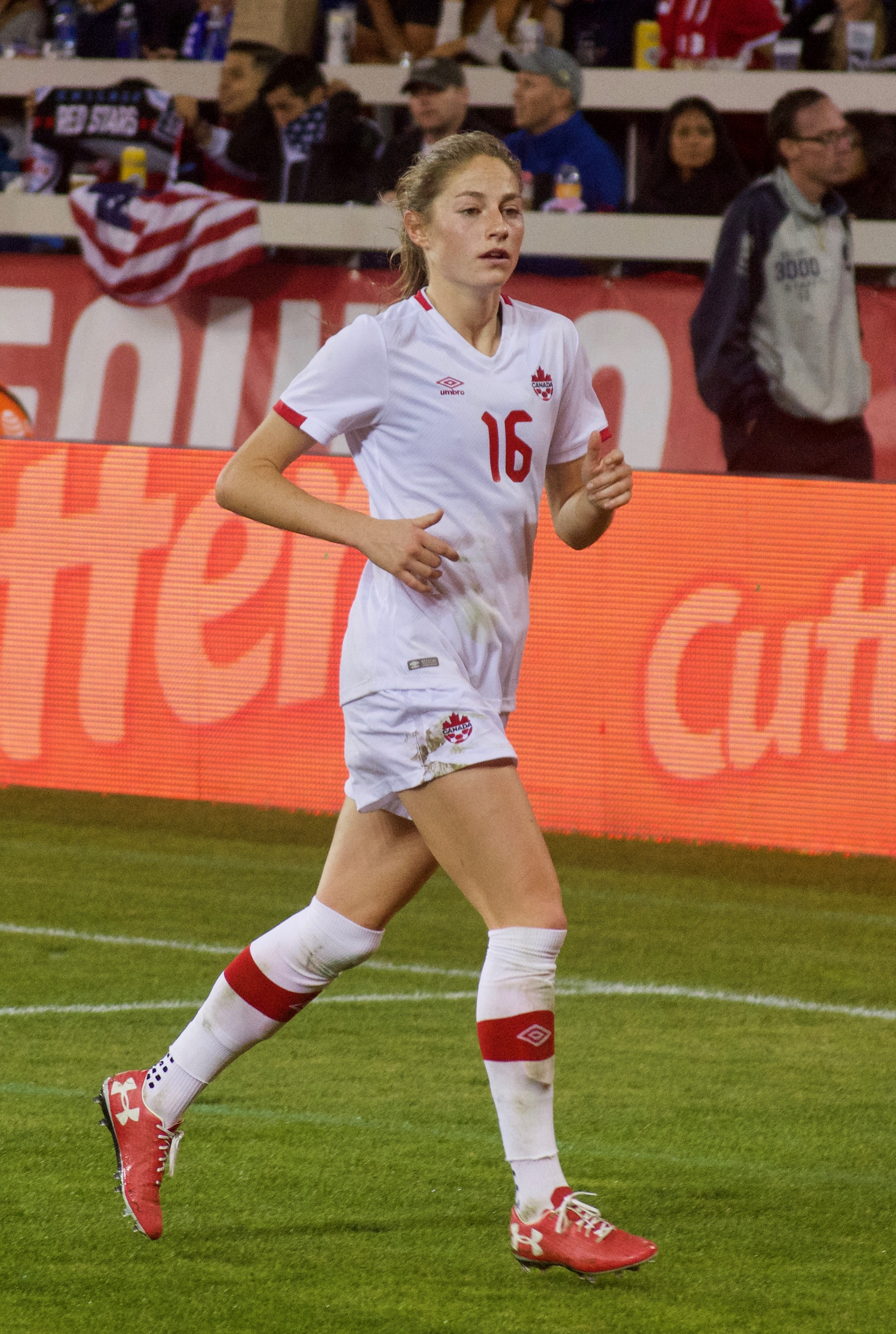
Janine Beckie, Texas Tech, 2× Big 12 Offensive Player of the Year

Big 12 Conference Offensive Player of the Year
Season	Player	School	Position	Class	Ref.
2007	Ashlee Pistorius *	Texas A&M	Forward	Senior	
2008	Yolanda Odenyo	Oklahoma State	Midfielder	Senior	
2009	Morgan Marlborough	Nebraska	Forward	Freshman	
2010	Morgan Marlborough (2)	Nebraska	Forward	Sophomore	
2011	Kelley Monogue	Texas A&M	Forward	Freshman	
2012	Renae Cuéllar	Oklahoma	Forward	Senior	
2013	Frances Silva	West Virginia	Forward	Senior	
2014	Janine Beckie	Texas Tech	Forward	Junior	
2015	Janine Beckie (2)	Texas Tech	Forward	Senior	
2016	Courtney Dike	Oklahoma State	Forward	Senior	
2016	Michaela Abam	West Virginia	Forward	Junior	
2017	Haley Woodard	Oklahoma State	Forward	Junior	
2018	Cyera Hintzen	Texas	Forward	Junior	
2019	Kirsten Davis	Texas Tech	Forward	Junior	
2020	Grace Collins	TCU	Forward	Sophomore	
2021	Kirsten Davis (2)	Texas Tech	Forward	Graduate	
2022	Trinity Byars	Texas	Forward	Sophomore	

== Defensive Player of the Year (2007–2022) ==
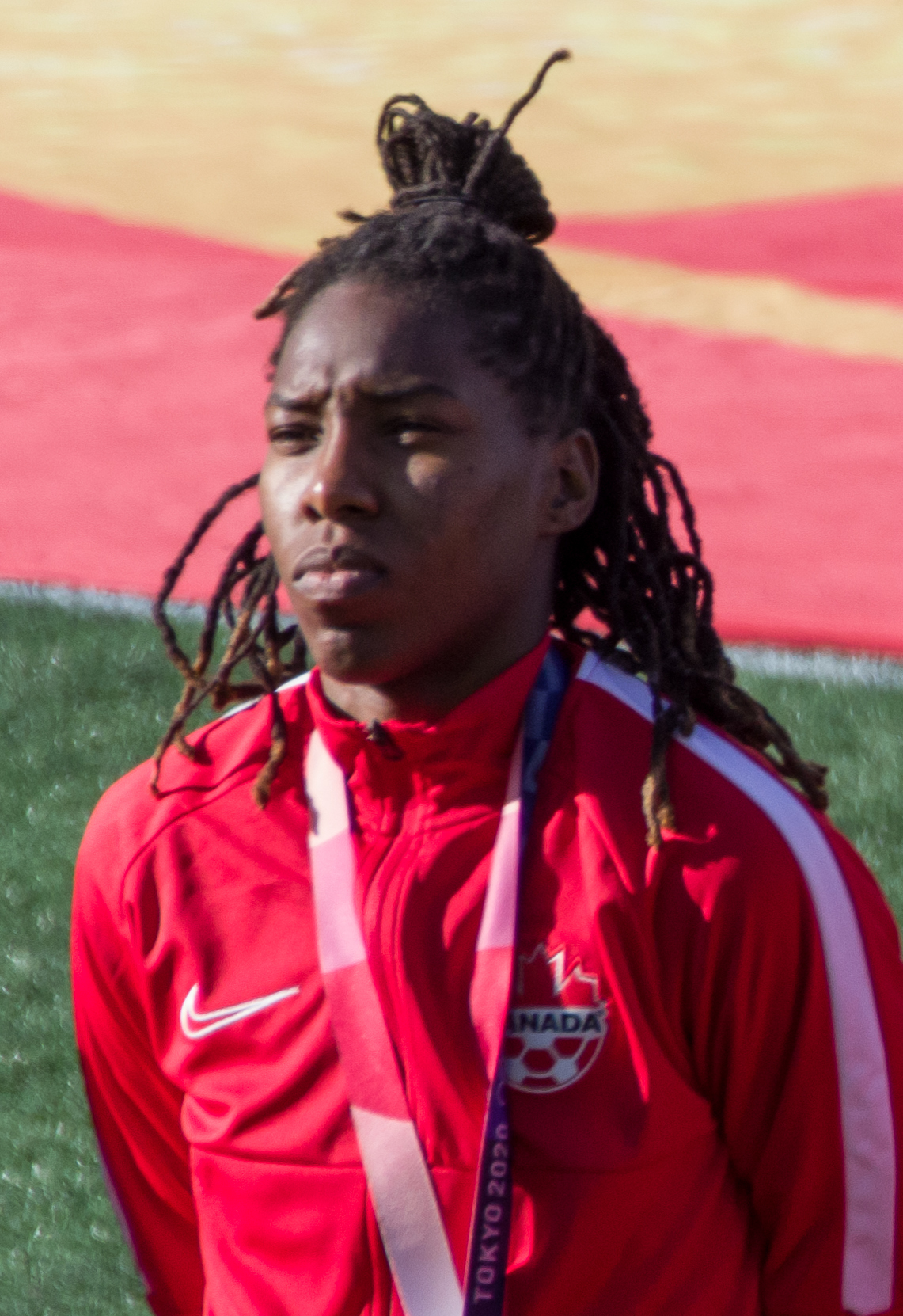
Kadeisha Buchanan, West Virginia, 4× Big 12 Defensive Player of the Year

Big 12 Conference Defensive Player of the Year
Season	Player	School	Position	Class	Ref.
2007	Kasey Moore	Texas	Defender	Senior	
2008	Kasey Moore (2)	Texas	Defender	Senior	
2008	Michelle Wenino	Colorado	Defender	Senior	
2009	Crystal Wagner	Missouri	Defender	Senior	
2010	Melinda Mercado	Oklahoma State	Defender	Junior	
2011	Melinda Mercado (2)	Oklahoma State	Defender	Senior	
2012	Bry McCarthy	West Virginia	Defender	Senior	
2013	Kadeisha Buchanan (1)	West Virginia	Defender	Freshman	
2014	Kadeisha Buchanan (2)	West Virginia	Defender	Sophomore	
2015	Kadeisha Buchanan (3)	West Virginia	Defender	Junior	
2016	Kadeisha Buchanan (4) *	West Virginia	Defender	Senior	
2017	Kayla Morrison	Kansas	Defender	Senior	
2017	Amandine Pierre-Louis	West Virginia	Defender	Senior	
2018	Bianca St-Georges	West Virginia	Defender	Senior	
2019	Addisyn Merrick	Kansas	Defender	Senior	
2020	Jordan Brewster	West Virginia	Defender	Junior	
2021	Brandi Peterson	TCU	Defender	Senior	
2022	EmJ Cox	Texas	Defender	Sophomore	

== Forward of the Year (2023–present) ==
Big 12 Conference Forward of the Year
Season	Player	School	Class	Ref.
2023	Trinity Byars	Texas	Junior	
2024	Bella Diorio	TCU	Sophomore	
2025	Hope Leyba	Colorado	Junior	
2026	Taylor Zdrojewski	Texas Tech	Senior	

== Midfielder of the Year (2023–present) ==
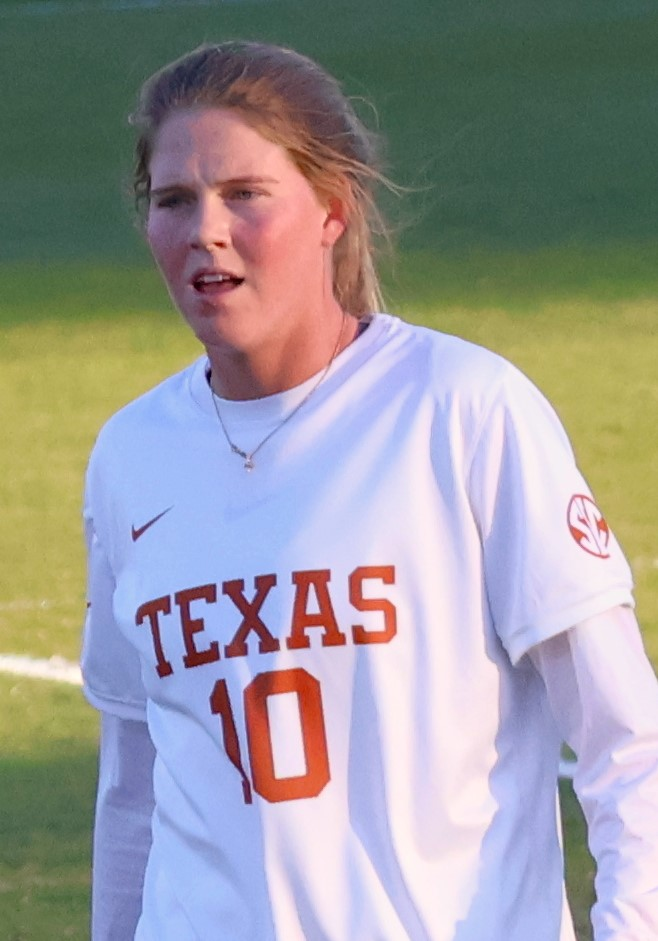
Lexi Missimo, Texas, 2023

Big 12 Conference Midfielder of the Year
Season	Player	School	Class	Ref.
2023	Lexi Missimo	Texas	Junior	
2024	Oli Peña	TCU	Senior	
2025	Tyler Isgrig	Baylor	Senior	
2026	Reagan Kotschau	Colorado	Senior	

== Defender of the Year (2023–present) ==
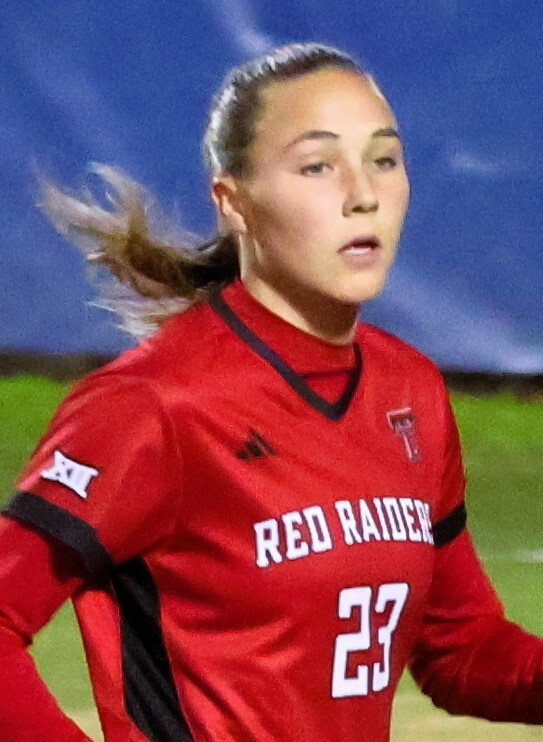
Macy Blackburn, Texas Tech, 2024

Big 12 Conference Defender of the Year
Season	Player	School	Class	Ref.
2023	Hannah Anderson	Texas Tech	Graduate	
2024	Macy Blackburn	Texas Tech	Junior	
2025	Macy Blackburn (2)	Texas Tech	Senior	
2026	Faith Leyba	Colorado	Senior	

== Goalkeeper of the Year (2020–present) ==
Big 12 Conference Goalkeeper of the Year
Season	Player	School	Class	Ref.
2020	Emily Alvarado	TCU	Senior	
2021	Lauren Kellett	TCU	Sophomore	
2022	Jordan Nytes	Oklahoma State	Freshman	
2022	Kayza Massey	West Virginia	Senior	
2023	Madison White	Texas Tech	Graduate	
2024	Jordan Nytes (2)	Colorado	Junior	
2025	Jordan Nytes (3)	Colorado	Senior	
2026	Addie Todd	Texas Tech	Senior	

== Newcomer/Freshman of the Year (1996–present) ==
Big 12 Conference Newcomer/Freshman of the Year
Season	Player	School	Position	Ref.
1996	Melanie Wilson	Texas A&M	Goalkeeper	
1997	Claire Elliott	Texas A&M	Defender	
1998	Erica Florez	Iowa State	Forward	
1999	Katie Antongiovanni	Iowa State	Midfielder	
2000	Kati McBain	Texas	Midfielder	
2001	Kelly Wilson	Texas	Forward	
2002	Fran Munnelly	Colorado	Midfielder	
2003	Katie Griffin	Colorado	Forward	
2004	Ashlee Pistorius	Texas A&M	Forward	
2005	Kasey Moore	Texas	Defender	
2006	Nikki Marshall	Colorado	Forward	
2007	Alysha Bonnick	Missouri	Forward	
2008	Emily Cressy	Kansas	Forward	
2009	Morgan Marlborough	Nebraska	Forward	
2010	Jessica Fuston	Texas Tech	Forward	
2011	Kelley Monogue	Texas A&M	Forward	
2012	Janine Beckie	Texas Tech	Forward	
2013	Kadeisha Buchanan	West Virginia	Defender	
2014	Michaela Abam	West Virginia	Forward	
2015	Lauren Piercy	Baylor	Forward	
2015	Bianca St-Georges	West Virginia	Defender	
2016	Cyera Hintzen	Texas	Forward	
2017	Haley Berg	Texas	Midfielder	
2018	Messiah Bright	TCU	Forward	
2018	Julia Grosso	Texas	Midfielder	
2019	Madison White	Texas Tech	Goalkeeper	
2020	Marz Akins	TCU	Defender	
2021	Lexi Missimo	Texas	Midfielder	
2022	Grace Coppinger	TCU	Defender	
2023	Sam Courtwright	Texas Tech	Midfielder	
2024	Kierra Blundell	Arizona State	Forward	
2025	Kamdyn Fuller	TCU	Midfielder	
2026	Brooke Goerish	Colorado	Goalkeeper	

== Coach of the Year (1996–present) ==
Big 12 Conference Coach of the Year
Season	Coach	School	Ref.
1996	John Walker	Nebraska	
1997	Cathy Klein	Iowa State	
1997	G Guerrieri	Texas A&M	
1998	Randy Waldrum	Baylor	
1999	John Walker (2)	Nebraska	
2000	Randy Evans	Oklahoma	
2001	Chris Petrucelli	Texas	
2002	Karen Hancock	Oklahoma State	
2002	G Guerrieri (2)	Texas A&M	
2003	Bill Hempen	Colorado	
2004	Mark Francis	Kansas	
2005	Rebecca Hornbacher	Iowa State	
2006	Karen Hancock (2)	Oklahoma State	
2006	Colin Carmichael	Oklahoma State	
2007	Bryan Blitz	Missouri	
2008	Colin Carmichael (2)	Oklahoma State	
2009	Bryan Blitz (2)	Missouri	
2010	Nicole Nelson	Oklahoma	
2010	Colin Carmichael (3)	Oklahoma State	
2011	Colin Carmichael (4)	Oklahoma State	
2012	Nikki Izzo-Brown	West Virginia	
2013	Nikki Izzo-Brown (2)	West Virginia	
2014	Nikki Izzo-Brown (3)	West Virginia	
2015	Nikki Izzo-Brown (4)	West Virginia	
2016	Nikki Izzo-Brown (5)	West Virginia	
2017	Colin Carmichael (5)	Oklahoma State	
2018	Paul Jobson	Baylor	
2019	Colin Carmichael (6)	Oklahoma State	
2020	Eric Bell	TCU	
2021	Eric Bell (2)	TCU	
2022	Angela Kelly	Texas	
2023	Tom Stone	Texas Tech	
2024	Eric Bell (3)	TCU	
2025	Eric Bell (4)	TCU	
2026	Jennifer Rockwood	BYU	

== See also ==
- Atlantic Coast Conference women's soccer awards
- Big Ten Conference women's soccer awards
- Pac-12 Conference women's soccer awards
- Southeastern Conference women's soccer awards
