= Taylor Zdrojewski =

American soccer player (born 2004)

Personal information
- Date of birth: 2004 (age 21–22)
- Height: 5 ft 10 in (1.78 m)
- Position: Forward

Team information
- Current team: Texas Tech Red Raiders
- Number: 16

Youth career
- 2015–2022: FC Dallas

College career
Years	Team	Apps	(Gls)
2022–	Texas Tech Red Raiders	78	(33)

Taylor Zdrojewski (born 2004) is an American college soccer player who plays as a forward for the Texas Tech Red Raiders. She was named Big 12 Forward of the Year in 2026.

== Early life ==
Zdrojewski grew up in Celina, Texas. She joined the academy of FC Dallas at age 11, where she claimed the U.S. Soccer Development Academy (DA) under-15 golden boot and was an ECNL all-conference selection. During her first two years at Celina High School, she served as team manager for the soccer team due to DA rules against playing in high school. When the DA ended in 2020, she joined the high school squad and scored a whopping 114 goals in her junior year, setting a Texas state record (potentially ranking second in national history). She led Celina to the UIL Class 4A state semifinals and was named the Dallas Morning News player of the year. She then committed to play college soccer for the Texas Tech Red Raiders. She finished her senior year with 62 goals as she led Celina to their first state title, scoring twice in the UIL Class 4A final.

== College career ==
Zdrojewski made 4 appearances for the Texas Tech Red Raiders as a freshman in 2022, missing most of the season after suffering a serious injury to her right knee affecting her anterior cruciate ligament (ACL), joint capsule, tibial plateau, and posterolateral corner (PLC). She returned to play in 21 games as a redshirt freshman in 2023, helping Texas Tech win their first Big 12 Conference regular-season title, though still recovering from the injury. She enjoyed a breakout sophomore season in 2024, leading the Red Raiders with 10 goals in 22 games and being named second-team All-Big 12.

Zdrojewski started all 21 games and scored 16 goals (third most in program history) in her junior year in 2025, garnering first-team All-Big 12 honors. She set a program record with 7 game-winning goals in a season and became the first Red Raider to record consecutive 10-goal seasons since Janine Beckie in 2015. She was named Big 12 Forward of the Year after her senior year in 2026.

== Honors and awards ==
Texas Tech Red Raiders

- Big 12 Conference: 2023

Individual

- Big 12 Forward of the Year: 2026
- First-team All-Big 12: 2025, 2026
- Second-team All-Big 12: 2024
