= Kirsten Wright =

American soccer player (born 1998)

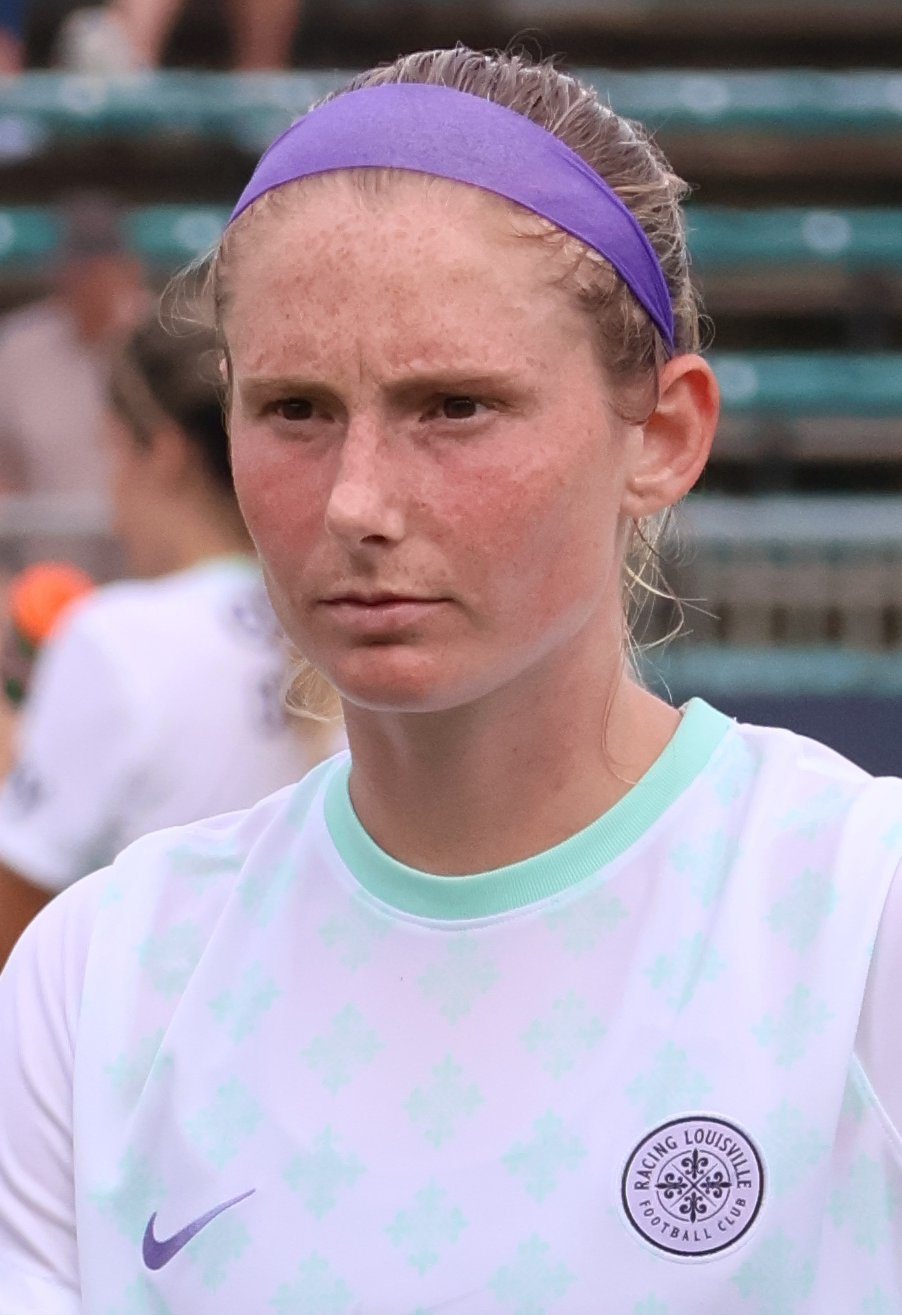
- Davis with Racing Louisville FC in 2023

Personal information
- Full name: Kirsten Davis Wright
- Birth name: Kirsten Mackenzie Davis
- Date of birth: September 8, 1998 (age 28)
- Place of birth: St. Louis, Missouri, United States
- Height: 5 ft 9 in (1.75 m)
- Position: Forward

Youth career
- 2014–2017: Westminster Academy
- Dallas Sting

College career
Years	Team	Apps	(Gls)
2017–2021	Texas Tech Red Raiders	94	(45)

Senior career*
Years	Team	Apps	(Gls)
2022–2025	Racing Louisville	39	(6)

International career
2016	United States U18		
2020	United States U23		
- * Club domestic league appearances and goals as of 03:27, January 22, 2026 (UTC)

Kirsten Davis Wright (born Kirsten Mackenzie Davis, September 8, 1998) is an American former professional soccer player who played as a forward. She played college soccer for the Texas Tech Red Raiders before spending four years professionally for Racing Louisville FC of the National Women's Soccer League (NWSL).

== Early life ==
Wright was born in St. Louis, Missouri on September 8, 1998 to parents from Texas. Her family lived in Australia for several years while she was in middle school, returning before her freshman year of high school.

Wright attended Westminster Christian Academy, where she scored 173 goals before graduating in 2017. In July 2017 she was named the Gatorade Player of the Year for Missouri. She also played youth club soccer with Dallas Sting and St. Louis Scott Gallagher of the Elite Clubs National League.

== College career ==
Wright played college soccer at Texas Tech from 2017 to 2021. She scored her first collegiate goal on August 27, 2017, against San Diego. In the 2018 Big 12 Conference women's soccer tournament, she scored one goal and was named to the All-Tournament team.

In 2019, Wright was named Big 12 Conference Offensive Player of the Year, and a United Soccer Coaches NCAA Division I First-Team All-American. She also set a program record for game-winning goals in a single season with six. In the 2020 season shortened by the impact of the COVID-19 pandemic on sports, the Red Raiders named Wright one of three team captains.

In 2021, Wright was again named the Big 12 Conference Offensive Player of the Year, and was the only Texas Tech player on the first or second all-conference teams. United Soccer Coaches named her a third-team All-American. Wright ended her Texas Tech career having scored the second-most goals in program history, behind Janine Beckie.

== Club career ==
Racing Louisville FC selected Wright in the second round of the 2021 NWSL Draft with the 12th-overall pick. She returned to Texas Tech after the draft for a fifth year before joining Louisville. Louisville protected Wright in the 2022 NWSL Expansion Draft despite her not yet having appeared for the team.

Wright made her Racing Louisville debut on March 18, 2022, against Kansas City Current. She scored her first goal for the club on March 25, 2022, against Houston Dash in a 2022 NWSL Challenge Cup match. While playing for Louisville, she often operated as a single striker.

On January 10, 2024, she signed a new three-year contract with Racing Louisville. In April 2024, she underwent right knee surgery, and was later placed on the season-ending injury list. After missing two consecutive seasons due to her injury, Wright announced her retirement from professional soccer in January 2026. She had recorded 39 NWSL appearances and 6 goals.

== International career ==
In 2015, Wright attended training camps with the United States under-19 and under-20 teams. She represented the United States under-18 team at the 2016 Women's International Cup. She was also called up to a training camp for the under-23 team in 2020, which was postponed due to the COVID-19 pandemic.

== Personal life ==
She married Garrett Wright in December 2022. In October 2025, Wright gave birth to her first child.

== Career statistics ==
Appearances and goals by club, season and competition
Club	Season	League			Cup (Note: Includes the NWSL Challenge Cup)		Playoffs (Note: Includes NWSL Playoffs)		Total	
Club	Season	Division	Apps	Goals	Apps	Goals	Apps	Goals	Apps	Goals
Racing Louisville FC	2022	NWSL	18	2	6	1	—		24	3
Racing Louisville FC	2023	NWSL	21	4	5	1	—		26	5
Racing Louisville FC	2024	NWSL	0	0	—		—		0	0
Racing Louisville FC	2025	NWSL	0	0	—		0	0	0	0
Career total			39	6	11	2	0	0	50	8

== Honors ==
Individual

- NCAA Division I First-Team All-America: 2019
- Big 12 Conference Offensive Player of the Year: 2019, 2021
