= Ashleigh Williams =

American soccer player (born 2003)

- Williams in 2025

Personal information
- Full name: Ashleigh Shea Williams
- Date of birth: March 3, 2003 (age 23)
- Height: 5 ft 7 in (1.70 m)
- Position: Forward

Youth career
- Sting Black 03

College career
Years	Team	Apps	(Gls)
2021–2024	Texas Tech Red Raiders	84	(37)

Senior career*
Years	Team	Apps	(Gls)
2025	Heart of Midlothian	4	(1)
- * Club domestic league appearances and goals as of 18:14, October 4, 2026 (UTC)

Ashleigh Shea Williams (born March 3, 2003) is an American professional soccer player who plays as a forward. She played college soccer for the Texas Tech Red Raiders, earning first-team All-Big 12 honors twice, before starting her professional career with Scottish Women's Premier League club Heart of Midlothian.

== Early life ==
Williams grew up in Allen, Texas. She played for Sting Black 03 in the Elite Clubs National League, helping the team become a two-time national contender. Williams attended Allen High School, where she spent one year playing for the soccer team before choosing to devote all her time to club play. In that single season, she earned all-region and all-district honors and was named to the all-state tournament team.

== College career ==
As a rookie with the Texas Tech Red Raiders in the 2021 fall season, Williams posted a season that earned her a spot on the Big 12 all-freshman team. Despite only earning a starting spot in the final 7 matches of the season, she ranked second on Texas Tech with 8 goals scored. Three of her goals came on September 19, 2021, in a second-half hat-trick against Eastern Washington. The following year, Williams was named second-team All-Big 12. She started all of the Red Raiders' matches on the season and would continue to do so for the remainder of her collegiate career. Her streak of 6 goals in 4 matches in October 2022 would go on to lead the Big 12 in goals in conference play. She ended the year with a team-leading 9 goals.

Williams with Texas Tech in 2024

Williams started her junior year on a positive note, registering 9 goals and 3 assists through the opening 5 games. In September 2023, College Soccer News named her its national player of the week. Williams went on to tally a career-high 14 goals and 6 assists; she also tied the Texas Tech program record for game-winners. One of her game-winning goals came in a victory over ISU that helped clinch the Red Raiders' first-ever Big 12 regular season title. Texas Tech also finished with its first perfect home record in program history. Williams was named to the All-Big 12 first team and All-Midwest first team at the conclusion of the season. As a senior in 2024, Williams rounded out her college career with another first-team All-Big 12 campaign. She helped the Red Raiders reach the semifinals of the Big 12 tournament and scored in the eventual defeat to Kansas on November 6, 2024. She completed her time at Texas Tech with 37 goals in 84 appearances; the Red Raiders only lost one game when Williams had scored a goal.

== Club career ==
On February 4, 2025, Scottish Women's Premier League club Heart of Midlothian announced the signing of Williams to her first professional contract, a deal through the end of the SWPL season. Two weeks later, Williams scored her first professional goal in her first start for her new club, netting in a 6–0 win over Queen's Park. However, after making 4 appearances for Hearts, Williams sustained an injury that sidelined her for the remainder of the season. She left the club upon the expiration of her rookie contract.

== Personal life ==
Three members of Williams' family have also played college soccer. Her mother, Candy Williams, played at Kansas Wesleyan. Her sister, Sydney, spent her freshman season at UTEP before transferring to Lamar University. Her brother, Lance, played for Oklahoma Baptist University.

== Honors and awards ==
Texas Tech Red Raiders

- Big 12 Conference: 2023

Individual

- First-team All-Big 12: 2023, 2024
- Second-team All-Big 12: 2022
- Big 12 All-freshman team: 2021
