= Yolanda Thomas =

Swedish footballer and coach (born 1984)

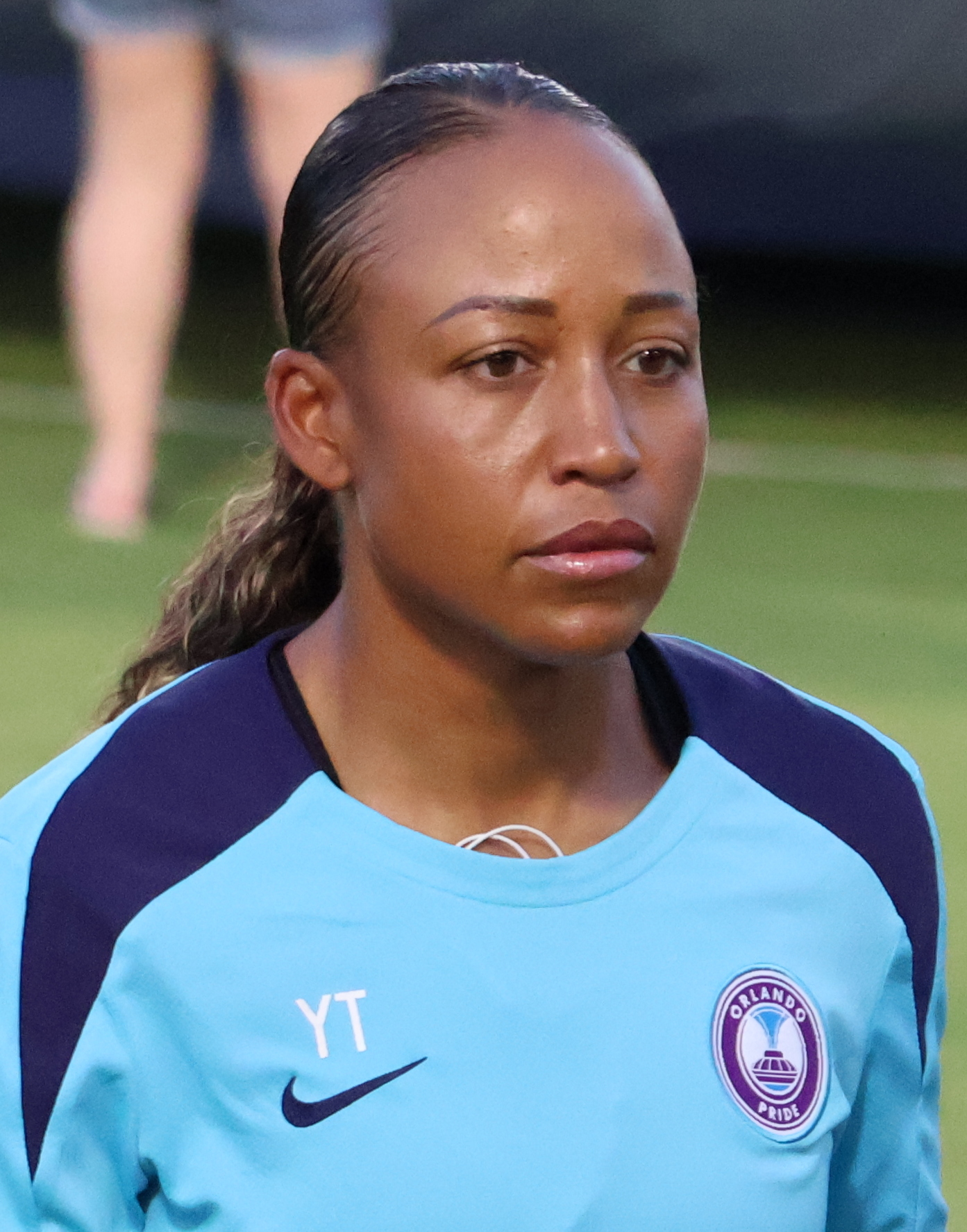
- Thomas with the Orlando Pride in 2026

Personal information
- Full name: Yolanda Odenyo Thomas
- Birth name: Yolanda Odenyo
- Date of birth: March 19, 1984 (age 42)
- Place of birth: Uppsala, Sweden
- Positions: Center back; midfielder

Team information
- Current team: Orlando Pride (interim head coach)

College career
Years	Team	Apps	(Gls)
2005–2008	Oklahoma State Cowgirls	86	(35)

Senior career*
Years	Team	Apps	(Gls)
2000–2004	Bälinge IF		
2007	Gamla Upsala SK		
2008	Jersey Sky Blue		
2009	Linköping FC		

International career
- Sweden U-16
- Sweden U-17
- Sweden U-19
- Sweden U-21

Managerial career
- 2015–2017: Tulsa Golden Hurricane (assistant)
- 2018–2019: Rogers State Hillcats
- 2018–2022: Fortuna Tulsa WPSL
- 2023–: Orlando Pride (assistant & head)
- * Club domestic league appearances and goals

Yolanda Odenyo Thomas (née Odenyo; born March 19, 1984) is a Swedish association football coach and former player who is the head coach of the Orlando Pride of the National Women's Soccer League (NWSL). She played college soccer for the Oklahoma State Cowgirls, earning All-American honors three times. She has also been an assistant coach for the Tulsa Golden Hurricane and the head coach of the Rogers State Hillcats.

== Playing career ==
Raised in Uppsala, Thomas joined Bälinge IF from Gamla Upsala SK. She cited Dutch player Ruud Gullit as her role model growing up. She represented Sweden internationally up to the under-21 level, appearing at the 2002 and 2003 UEFA Women's Under-19 Championships and captaining the under-19s to the semifinals at the latter. She initially committed to play college soccer for the powerhouse North Carolina Tar Heels. However, she had her scholarship offer rescinded after the NCAA said she had been paid more than an amateur was allowed by her Swedish club. Karen Hancock and the Oklahoma State Cowgirls were later able to clear her eligibility and she joined the program as a freshman in 2005. She was told by her youth national team coach that she would not be called up again if she went to the United States, though senior team manager Thomas Dennerby later expressed interest in the player.

She finished her freshman season with 7 goals and 4 assists in 19 games from the back line and was named second-team All-Big 12. In 2006, she finished her outstanding sophomore season with 5 goals and 8 assists in 21 games and was named first-team All-American and the Big 12 Co-Player of the Year alongside Nebraska's Brittany Timko, becoming the first Cowgirl to be named All-American. She had a goal and an assist in their first-ever NCAA tournament match win. In her junior year in 2007, she scored 7 goals and was named first-team All-Big 12 for the second time and second-team All-American by SoccerBuzz. In her senior year in 2008, she led the Big 12 with 16 goals and was named the Big 12 Conference Offensive Player of the Year and was an All-American for the third time. She also led the Cowgirls to their first Big 12 regular-season title and the NCAA tournament second round for the third straight year. With multiple program records including career goals and single-season goals, she was inducted into the OSU Athletics Hall of Honor in 2023.

During college, she also played for Gamla Upsala SK in 2007, and USL W-League club Jersey Sky Blue in 2008. She attended the Women's Professional Soccer (WPS) combine before the 2009 WPS Draft. She went unselected and returned to Sweden with Linköping FC, though suffered a serious back injury in training in January 2009. She decided to retire from playing and enter coaching after the injury.

== Coaching career ==
Thomas coached high school soccer for four seasons at Edmond Memorial High School in Edmond, Oklahoma. She was also the director of SoccerCity Oklahoma City and Lil' Kickers youth program.

She became an assistant coach for the Tulsa Golden Hurricane under Kyle Cussen in 2015.

She became the head coach of the Rogers State Hillcats in 2018. After two seasons at Rogers State, she became the ECNL girls' director for Tulsa Soccer Club in 2020. She was also the head coach of Fortuna Tulsa in the Women's Premier Soccer League (WPSL).

Thomas became an assistant coach for the National Women's Soccer League (NWSL)'s Orlando Pride under head coach Seb Hines in 2023. In her second season in 2024, she helped the Pride win their first NWSL Shield and NWSL Championship. In August 2026, Hines was fired and Thomas was elevated to interim head coach. On November 12, 2026, the interim tag was removed and Thomas was named head coach, the first Black woman to serve as a permanent head coach in the NWSL.

== Personal life ==
Thomas is the daughter of Victor and Carina Odenyo and had five siblings. Her father is Kenyan and her mother is Swedish. Her older sister Sasja, who played college soccer for the FIU Panthers, died in a car crash that also killed a teammate in 2002. She and her husband Phillip, a pastor, have three children.

== Honors and awards ==
=== As player ===
Oklahoma State Cowgirls

- Big 12 Conference: 2008

Individual

- First-team All-American: 2006
- Big 12 Conference Co-Player of the Year: 2006
- Big 12 Conference Offensive Player of the Year: 2008
- First-team All-Big 12: 2006, 2007, 2008
- Second-team All-Big 12: 2005

=== As manager ===
Orlando Pride (assistant)

- NWSL Championship: 2024
- NWSL Shield: 2024
