= 2022 Racing Louisville FC season =

Racing Louisville FC 2022 soccer season

Racing Louisville
2022 season
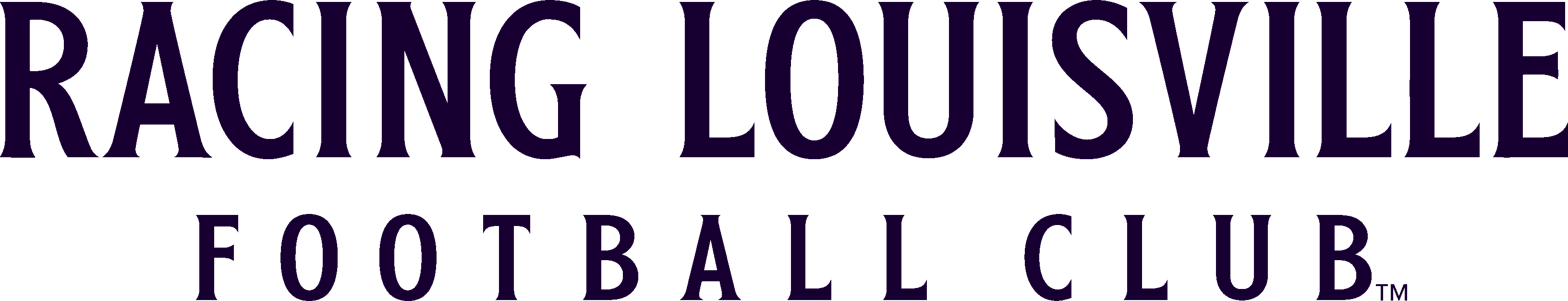
- Owner: John Neace
- Manager: Kim Björkegren
- Stadium: Lynn Family Stadium
- NWSL: 9th
- NWSL Playoffs: DNQ
- Challenge Cup: Group stage
- The Women's Cup: Runners-up
- Top goalscorer: League: Nadia Nadim (6); All: Nadia Nadim (6)
- Highest home attendance: 8,729 (Aug. 27 vs. CHI)
- Lowest home attendance: 5,107 (Aug. 2 vs. SEA)
- Average home league attendance: 6,048
- Biggest win: 2 goals (2–0 Sept. 16 vs. ORL) (3–1 Sept. 25 vs. LA)
- Biggest defeat: 4 goals (0–4 Aug. 27 vs. CHI) (1–5 Sept. 10 vs. NC)
Home colours	Away colours

The 2022 Racing Louisville FC season was the club's second season of play. Racing Louisville competes in the National Women's Soccer League, the top flight of professional women's soccer in the United States. The club finished 9th in the 12-team league's regular season and failed to qualify for the playoffs, was eliminated during the group stage of the 2022 NWSL Challenge Cup, and were runners-up in the 2022 The Women's Cup hosted by the club.

== Background ==
In its inaugural season, Racing Louisville built a squad from the 2020 NWSL Expansion Draft, the 2021 NWSL Draft, a series of free agent signings, and international transfers after the opening of the season under first head coach Christy Holly. After two losses and two draws to open the campaign in the 2021 NWSL Challenge Cup, Racing Louisville experienced an up-and-down 2021 NWSL season which saw the club finish 9th in the 10-team league and miss the playoffs.

The club's greatest success in the first year was as host of an inaugural international competition called The Women's Cup, a 4-team mid-season competition won by Racing Louisville with a defeat of FC Bayern Munich on penalties.

In the middle of the season on August 31, 2021, the club fired Holly for cause and installed Mario Sanchez as interim head coach. On December 9, after the season concluded, the club announced the hiring of Kim Björkegren as the second permanent head coach of Racing Louisville.

The 2021 NWSL Championship, originally planned to be played in Portland, Oregon, was moved by the league on October 13, 2022, to Racing Louisville's home ground of Lynn Family Stadium following player complaints regarding the artificial turf at Providence Park and the 9 a.m. local kickoff time required to meet television obligations. The match, played on November 20, 2021, was won by the Washington Spirit over the Chicago Red Stars before 10,300 attending fans, a record for a women's soccer match in the venue.

== Current squad ==
Several players departed from Racing Louisville's 2021 squad after the season ended. Aside from free transfers, Racing traded Savannah McCaskill to Angel City FC, Julia Ashley was sent to Houston Dash, Yuki Nagasato was traded back to Chicago Red Stars, and Kaleigh Riehl was selected by San Diego Wave FC in the 2022 NWSL Expansion Draft. Louisville traded Cece Kizer and Addisyn Merrick to their hometown club of Kansas City, and Ebony Salmon to Houston Dash, while also waiving Erin Simon, who was subsequently signed by Leicester City W.F.C. on a free transfer.

Racing Louisville traded the rights to Christen Press to Angel City FC in exchange for expansion draft protection, the rights to Janine Beckie to Portland Thorns FC in exchange for allocation money, and the rights to Tobin Heath to OL Reign for allocation money and draft picks.

Racing Louisville reloaded primarily through the 2022 NWSL Draft, bringing Jaelin Howell, Savannah DeMelo, and Jordyn Bloomer into the squad. Louisville acquired Jess McDonald through a trade with North Carolina Courage, signed 2021 draftees Kirsten Davis and Parker Goins, and signed free agents Hillary Beall, Taylor Malham, Julia Lester, Rebecca Holloway, Alex Chidiac, Satara Murray, and Thembi Kgatlana to pro contracts. Following FIFA's ruling that foreign player contracts with Russian clubs were voidable in the wake of the Russian invasion of Ukraine, Sh'Nia Gordon left CSKA Moscow and signed with Racing Louisville.

On July 27, 2022, Racing announced that Gordon and Taylor Otto had mutually terminated their contracts with the club to pursue playing opportunities in Europe, and that National Team Replacement player Zaneta Wyne had signed a contract through 2023. The club did not offer permanent contracts to its other National Team Replacement players — Hannah Adler, Isabella Beletic, and Allison Whitfield.

On August 1, 2022, Racing traded $30,000 of allocation money and a fourth-round pick in the 2023 NWSL Draft to OL Reign for the discovery rights to sign China women's national football team forward Wang Shuang to an NWSL contract. On August 10, after Wang received her visa, the club announced that it had signed Wang to a contract through the 2023 season.

On August 15, 2022, Racing announced the transfer of goalkeeper Kelsey Daugherty from Djurgårdens IF. Per a club statement, Björkegren said the signing would allow the club to loan out backup goalkeepers Beall and Bloomer.

On September 7, 2022, Racing announced the transfer of midfielder Freja Olofsson to Real Madrid four months into her three-year contract with Racing, in exchange for an undisclosed transfer fee.

Racing announced the loan of goalkeeper Hillary Beall to Western United FC, from the end of the NWSL season to the end of the A-League Women season in April, on September 27, 2022.

As of September 7, 2022

No.	Position	Nation	Player
1	GK	USA	Katie Lund
2	MF	USA	Lauren Milliet
4	DF	ENG	Gemma Bonner
6	MF	USA	Jaelin Howell
7	MF	USA	Savannah DeMelo
10	FW	DEN	Nadia Nadim
11	DF	USA	Emily Fox
12	MF	USA	Taylor Malham
13	FW	USA	Emina Ekic
14	FW	USA	Jess McDonald
15	DF	USA	Julia Lester
16	FW	RSA	Thembi Kgatlana
17	DF	USA	Nealy Martin
18	GK	USA	Hillary Beall
20	FW	JAM	Cheyna Matthews
21	FW	USA	Parker Goins
22	FW	USA	Kirsten Davis
24	GK	USA	Jordyn Bloomer
25	DF	NIR	Rebecca Holloway
27	MF	AUS	Alex Chidiac
30	DF	USA	Zaneta Wyne
31	GK	USA	Kelsey Daugherty
44	DF	JAM	Satara Murray
77	FW	CHN	Wang Shuang

== Competitions ==
=== Preseason friendlies ===
All preseason friendlies for this Racing Louisville season were closed to the public with results not published.

February 18, 2022	Racing Louisville	v	Louisville Cardinals	Louisville, Kentucky
				Stadium: Lynn Family Sports Vision & Training Center

February 21, 2022	Florida State Seminoles	v	Racing Louisville	Tallahassee, Florida
				Stadium: Seminole Soccer Complex

February 24, 2022	Florida State Seminoles	v	Racing Louisville	Tallahassee, Florida
				Stadium: Seminole Soccer Complex

March 5, 2022	Racing Louisville	v	Tennessee Volunteers	Louisville, Kentucky
				Stadium: Lynn Family Sports Vision & Training Center

March 12, 2022	Racing Louisville	v	Murray State Racers	Louisville, Kentucky
				Stadium: Lynn Family Sports Vision & Training Center

=== NWSL Challenge Cup ===
==== Match results ====
18 March 1	Racing Louisville	1–1	Kansas City Current	Louisville, Kentucky
7:30 PM ET	Kizer 20'; Bonner (yellow card) 60'	Report	McCain 78', (yellow card) 83'	Stadium: Lynn Family Stadium; Attendance: 5,332; Referee: Danielle Cheskey

25 March 2	Racing Louisville	2–3	Houston Dash	Louisville, Kentucky
7:30 PM ET	Davis 16'; McDonald 40'; Olofsson (yellow card) 61'	Report	Viggiano (yellow card) 4', (goal) 58'; Chapman (yellow card) 20'; Hedge (yellow card) 45'; Sánchez 56'; Daly 65' (pen.); Prince (yellow card) 72'	Stadium: Lynn Family Stadium; Attendance: 3,800; Referee: Sergii Demianchuk

30 March 3	Chicago Red Stars	0–0	Racing Louisville	Bridgeview, Illinois
6:30 PM CT/7:30 PM ET	Nagasato (yellow card) 21'	Report		Stadium: SeatGeek Stadium; Referee: Calin Radosav

2 April 4	Kansas City Current	0–3	Racing Louisville	Kansas City, Kansas
2:00 PM CT/3:00 PM ET		Report	Mace 9' (o.g.); DeMelo (yellow card) 50'; Milliet 60'; Bonner 65'; Simon (yellow card) 90+6'	Stadium: Children's Mercy Park; Referee: Alyssa Nichols

16 April 5	Racing Louisville	1–1	Chicago Red Stars	Louisville, Kentucky
7:30 PM ET	Olofsson (yellow card) 27'; Ekic 76'	Report	Kowalski 7'; Colaprico (yellow card) 51'; DiBernardo (yellow card) 75'; Cook (yellow card) 84'	Stadium: Lynn Family Stadium; Attendance: 4,409; Referee: Laura Rodriguez

24 April 6	Houston Dash	2–1	Racing Louisville FC	Houston, Texas
4:00 PM CT/5:00 PM ET	Prince 24'; Eddy (yellow card) 29'; Prisock 35'; Anderson (yellow card) 61'	Report	Milliet (yellow card) 11'; Howell 29'; Martin (yellow card) 67'	Stadium: PNC Stadium; Attendance: 3,073; Referee: Brad Jensen

=== NWSL Regular Season ===
Following their loss to the North Carolina Courage on September 10, Racing were eliminated from NWSL playoff contention.

==== Standings ====
Pos	Team	Pld	W	D	L	GF	GA	GD	Pts	Qualification
1	OL Reign	22	11	7	4	32	19	+13	40	NWSL Shield, Playoffs – semi-finals
2	Portland Thorns FC (C)	22	10	9	3	49	24	+25	39	Playoffs – semi-finals
3	San Diego Wave FC	22	10	6	6	32	21	+11	36	Playoffs – first round
4	Houston Dash	22	10	6	6	35	27	+8	36	Playoffs – first round
5	Kansas City Current	22	10	6	6	29	29	0	36	Playoffs – first round
6	Chicago Red Stars	22	9	6	7	34	28	+6	33	Playoffs – first round
7	North Carolina Courage	22	9	5	8	46	33	+13	32	
8	Angel City FC	22	8	5	9	23	27	−4	29	
9	Racing Louisville FC	22	5	8	9	23	35	−12	23	
10	Orlando Pride	22	5	7	10	22	45	−23	22	
11	Washington Spirit	22	3	10	9	26	33	−7	19	
12	NJ/NY Gotham FC	22	4	1	17	16	46	−30	13	

Source: NWSL
Rules for classification: Tiebreakers
(C) Champions

==== Results summary ====
Overall								Home						Away					
Pld	W	D	L	GF	GA	GD	Pts	W	D	L	GF	GA	GD	W	D	L	GF	GA	GD
22	5	8	9	21	37	−16	23	3	4	5	11	17	−6	2	4	4	10	20	−10

Last updated: October 1, 2022.
Source: Match reports

Round	1	2	3	4	5	6	7	8	9	10	11	12	13	14	15	16	17	18	19	20	21	22
Stadium	A	A	H	H	A	A	H	H	A	A	H	A	H	H	H	A	H	A	H	A	A	H
Result	L	D	D	W	W	L	L	L	D	D	L	D	L	D	D	D	L	L	W	L	W	W
Position	10	9	9	5	3	5	8	9	9	8	10	10	11	11	11	9	10	11	10	11	10	9

Updated to match(es) played on October 1, 2022. Source: Match reports
A = Away; H = Home; W = Win; D = Draw; L = Loss

==== Match results ====
The 2022 NWSL Season will feature 12 teams with the addition of expansion sides Angel City FC and San Diego Wave FC. All clubs will play a balanced schedule with one home match and one away match against all others.

April 30 1	Chicago Red Stars	2–1	Racing Louisville FC	Bridgeview, Illinois
19:00 CDT	Stevens 2' (Colaprico), (yellow card) 68'; St-Georges 25'; Colaprico (yellow card) 47'	Report	Fox 10' (Kizer); Bonner (yellow card) 75'	Stadium: SeatGeek Stadium; Attendance: 3,028; Referee: Jeremy Scheer

May 8 2	OL Reign	2–2	Racing Louisville FC	Seattle, Washington
15:00 PDT	King 33' (Angelina), 37'; Balcer (yellow card) 64'; Angelina (yellow card) 70'	Report	McDonald 23' (Kizer); Balcer 60' (o.g.); Lund (yellow card) 65'	Stadium: Lumen Field; Attendance: 4,396; Referee: Karen Callado

May 14 3	Racing Louisville FC	1–1	Houston Dash	Louisville, Kentucky
20:00 EDT	Martin (yellow card) 67'; McDonald 82' (Milliet)	Report	Hanson (yellow card) 60'; Prince 77'; Hedge (yellow card) 78'; Daly (yellow card) 89'	Stadium: Lynn Family Stadium; Attendance: 5,271; Referee: Samantha Martinez

May 18 4	Racing Louisville FC	1–0	San Diego Wave FC	Louisville, Kentucky
19:30 EDT	Milliet (yellow card) 14'; DeMelo 27'; Simon (yellow card) 89'	Report	Gyau (yellow card) 36'; Turnbow (yellow card) 44'	Stadium: Lynn Family Stadium; Attendance: 5,302; Referee: Joshua Encarnación

May 22 5	NJ/NY Gotham FC	0–1	Racing Louisville FC	Harrison, New Jersey
17:00 EDT	Johnson (yellow card) 19'; Baxter (yellow card) 69'	Report	Milliet 13' (McDonald); Howell (yellow card) 73'; Olofsson (yellow card) 90+4'	Stadium: Red Bull Arena; Attendance: 2,672; Referee: Thomas Snyder

May 30 6	Kansas City Current	1–0	Racing Louisville FC	Kansas City, Kansas
14:00 CDT	LaBonta 3' (pen.)	Report		Stadium: Children's Mercy Park; Attendance: 6,484; Referee: Danielle Chesky

June 4 7	Racing Louisville FC	0–3	North Carolina Courage	Louisville, Kentucky
20:00 EDT	DeMelo (yellow card) 53'	Report	Kurtz 4' (Debinha); Ordoñez 45+1' (Mathias); Mathias (yellow card) 75'; Debinha	Stadium: Lynn Family Stadium; Attendance: 5,738; Referee: Eric Tattersall

June 11 8	Racing Louisville FC	2–3	Angel City FC	Louisville, Kentucky
20:00 EDT	Bonner (yellow card) 24', (goal) 29' (DeMelo); Nadim 65' (pen.), (yellow card) 85'; Howell (yellow card) 74'; Lund (yellow card) 90+2'	Report	Nielsen (yellow card) 19'; Press 36' (Reid); McCaskill 47' (Press), 90+3' (pen.), (yellow card) 49'; Le Bihan (yellow card) 68'	Stadium: Lynn Family Stadium; Attendance: 6,139; Referee: Matthew Thompson

June 17 9	Washington Spirit	2–2	Racing Louisville FC	Washington, D.C.
19:30 EDT	Roddar (yellow card) 8'; Rodman 34' (Sanchez); Elwell 43'; O'Hara (yellow card) 51'	Report	Nadim 66' (McDonald), 88' (McDonald); Fox (yellow card) 73'	Stadium: Audi Field; Attendance: 2,790; Referee: Matthew Franz

July 3 10	Orlando Pride	2–2	Racing Louisville FC	Daytona Beach, Florida
20:00 EDT	Celia (yellow card) 45'; Dougherty Howard (yellow card) 47'; Montefusco (yellow card) 50'; Strom 59' (Jenkins); Jenkins 69' (Tymrak); Tymrak (yellow card) 77'	Report	Olofsson (yellow card) 16'; Ekic 34'; DeMelo 51'; Martin (yellow card) 61'	Stadium: Daytona International Speedway; Attendance: 7,573; Referee: Alex Billeter

July 8 11	Racing Louisville FC	1–2	NJ/NY Gotham FC	Louisville, Kentucky
20:00 EDT	Lester (yellow card) 58'; DeMelo 67', (yellow card) 90+1'; Howell (yellow card) 85'	Report	Dydasco (yellow card) 23'; Dorsey (yellow card) 24'; Monaghan 25' (Sheehan); Zerboni (yellow card) 43'; Cudjoe (yellow card) 74'; Smith 80' (Kawasumi)	Stadium: Lynn Family Stadium; Attendance: 5,771; Referee: Danielle Chesky

July 15 12	San Diego Wave FC	0–0	Racing Louisville FC	San Diego, California
19:00 PDT	Wyne (yellow card) 40'; Howell (yellow card) 48'	Report	Riehl (yellow card) 80'	Stadium: Torero Stadium; Attendance: 4,747; Referee: Karen Callado

July 29 13	Racing Louisville FC	1–2	Portland Thorns FC	Louisville, Kentucky
20:00 EDT	Chidiac 29' (Howell); Murray (yellow card) 75'; Nadim (yellow card) 89'	Report	Smith 7' (Weaver); Sauerbrunn (yellow card) 21'; Sugita 74'	Stadium: Lynn Family Stadium; Attendance: 7,089; Referee: Alyssa Nichols

August 2 14	Racing Louisville FC	1–1	OL Reign	Louisville, Kentucky
20:00 EDT	Fox (yellow card) 36'; Davis 45+1', (yellow card) 61'	Report	Fishlock 2' (Rapinoe); Huitema (yellow card) 55'; Heath (yellow card) 90+2'	Stadium: Lynn Family Stadium; Attendance: 5,107; Referee: Laura Rodriguez

August 5 15	Racing Louisville FC	1–1	Washington Spirit	Louisville, Kentucky
20:00 EDT	Nadim 52' (Davis); Lester (yellow card) 78'	Report	Hatch 64' (Baggett)	Stadium: Lynn Family Stadium; Attendance: 5,364; Referee: Rebecca Pagan

August 12 16	Houston Dash	0–0	Racing Louisville FC	Houston, Texas
19:30 CDT	Prince (yellow card) 59'	Report	Murray (yellow card) 33' (yellow-red card) 42'	Stadium: PNC Stadium; Attendance: 5,279; Referee: Katja Koroleva

August 27 17	Racing Louisville FC	0–4	Chicago Red Stars	Louisville, Kentucky
19:30 EDT	Bonner (yellow card) 22'; Nadim (yellow card) 90+4'	Report	Pugh 3' (St-Georges), 73' (Nagasato); Nagasato 18' (Pugh), 23' (Pugh)	Stadium: Lynn Family Stadium; Attendance: 8,729; Referee: Alex Billeter

September 10 18	North Carolina Courage	5–1	Racing Louisville FC	Cary, North Carolina
19:00 EDT	Kerolin 9' (O'Sullivan), 42'; Debinha 56' (Kerolin), 84' (pen.); Boade 90' (Kerolin)	Report	Lester (yellow card) 41'; Wyne (yellow card) 45+1'; Nadim 72'	Stadium: WakeMed Soccer Park; Referee: Samantha Martinez

September 16 19	Racing Louisville FC	2–0	Orlando Pride	Louisville, Kentucky
19:30 EDT	Nadim 10' (McDonald); DeMelo 50' (Wang); Lund (yellow card) 82'	Report		Stadium: Lynn Family Stadium; Attendance: 5,397; Referee: Anya Voigt

September 21 20	Portland Thorns FC	3–0	Racing Louisville FC	Portland, Oregon
19:00 PDT	Smith 47'; Coffey 48' (Kuikka); Moultrie (yellow card) 33', (goal) 56'	Report	DeMelo (yellow card) 61'	Stadium: Providence Park; Attendance: 15,652

September 25 21	Angel City FC	1–3	Racing Louisville FC	Los Angeles, California
17:00 PDT	McCaskill 14' (Endo)	Report	Davis 37' (Howell); Lester (yellow card) 40'; Chidiac 43' (pen.); McDonald (yellow card) 75'; Murray (yellow card) 82'; Ekic 90' (Fox)	Stadium: Banc of California Stadium; Attendance: 22,000; Referee: Adorae Monroy; Assistant referees: Katarzyna Wasiak, Melissa Beck; Fourth official: Joseph Salinas

October 1 22	Racing Louisville FC	1–0	Kansas City Current	Louisville, Kentucky
19:30 EDT	Ekic (yellow card) 72'; McDonald 90+2' (DeMelo)	Report	Scott (red card) 78'; Del Fava (yellow card) 90+1'	Stadium: Lynn Family Stadium; Attendance: 6,622; Referee: Danielle Chesky

=== The Women's Cup ===
August 17 Semifinal	Racing Louisville FC (United States)	2–0	(Italy) AC Milan	Louisville, Kentucky
20:00 EDT	Olofsson (yellow card) 5'; Nadim 12'; Shuang 24'	Report	Rubio (yellow card) 17'; Piemonte (yellow card) 41'; Árnadóttir (yellow card) 50'	Stadium: Lynn Family Stadium

August 20 Championship	Racing Louisville FC (United States)	1–2	(United States) OL Reign	Louisville, Kentucky
19:00 EDT	Davis 34'	Report; Story; Highlights	Huerta (yellow card) 20'; Huitema 66'; Athens 59'	Stadium: Lynn Family Stadium

=== NWSL Playoffs ===
Racing Louisville FC finished 9th in the regular season and did not qualify for the 2022 NWSL Playoffs.

== Player statistics ==
Source: NWSLsoccer.com

=== Goals ===
Matches as of October 1, 2022.

Place	Pos.	No.	Name	CC	NWSL	NWSL Playoffs	Total
1	FW	10	(Denmark) Nadia Nadim	0	6	0	6
2	MF	16	(United States) Savannah DeMelo	0	4	0	4
2	FW	14	(United States) Jess McDonald	1	3	0	4
4	FW	22	(United States) Kirsten Davis	1	2	0	3
4	FW	13	(United States) Emina Ekic	1	2	0	3
6	DF	4	(England) Gemma Bonner	1	1	0	2
6	MF	27	(Australia) Alex Chidiac	0	2	0	2
6	MF	2	(United States) Lauren Milliet	1	1	0	2
6	N/A	-	Opponent own goals	1	1	0	2
10	DF	11	(United States) Emily Fox	0	1	0	1
10	FW	5	(United States) Cece Kizer	1	0	0	1
Total				7	23	0	30

=== Assists ===
Matches as of October 1, 2022.

Place	Pos.	No.	Name	CC	NWSL	NWSL Playoffs	Total
1	FW	14	(United States) Jess McDonald	1	4	0	5
2	MF	16	(United States) Savannah DeMelo	0	3	0	3
3	FW	5	(United States) CeCe Kizer	0	2	0	2
4	FW	13	(United States) Emina Ekic	1	0	0	1
4	FW	22	(United States) Kirsten Davis	0	1	0	1
4	MF	6	(United States) Jaelin Howell	0	1	0	1
4	MF	2	(United States) Lauren Milliet	0	1	0	1
4	MF	77	(China) Wang Shuang	0	1	0	1
4	DF	11	(United States) Emily Fox	0	1	0	1
Total				2	13	0	15

=== Clean sheets ===
Matches as of October 1, 2022.

Place	Pos.	No.	Name	CC	NWSL	NWSL Playoffs	Total
1	GK	1	(United States) Katie Lund	2	6	0	8
Total				2	6	0	8

=== Disciplinary ===
Matches as of October 1, 2022.

Place	Pos.	No.	Name	CC	NWSL		NWSL Playoffs	Total	
Place	Pos.	No.	Name	Yellow card	Yellow card	Red card	Yellow card	Yellow card	Red card
1	DF	30	(Jamaica) Satara Murray	0	4	1	0	4	1
2	DF	4	(England) Gemma Bonner	1	3	0	0	4	0
2	MF	7	(United States) Savannah DeMelo	1	3	0	0	4	0
2	MF	6	(United States) Jaelin Howell	0	4	0	0	4	0
2	MF	8	(Sweden) Freja Olofsson	2	2	0	0	4	0
6	DF	15	(United States) Julia Lester	0	4	0	0	4	0
6	GK	1	(United States) Katie Lund	0	3	0	0	3	0
6	DF	17	(United States) Nealy Martin	1	2	0	0	3	0
6	FW	10	(Denmark) Nadia Nadim	0	3	0	0	3	0
10	FW	22	(United States) Kirsten Davis	0	2	0	0	2	0
10	DF	11	(United States) Emily Fox	0	2	0	0	2	0
10	MF	2	(United States) Lauren Milliet	1	1	0	0	2	0
10	DF	3	(United States) Erin Simon	1	1	0	0	2	0
10	DF	30	(United States) Zaneta Wyne	0	2	0	0	2	0
15	FW	13	(United States) Emina Ekic	0	1	0	0	1	0
15	FW	14	(United States) Jess McDonald	0	1	0	0	1	0
Total				7	38	1	0	45	1
