= Sam Courtwright =

American soccer player (born 2004)

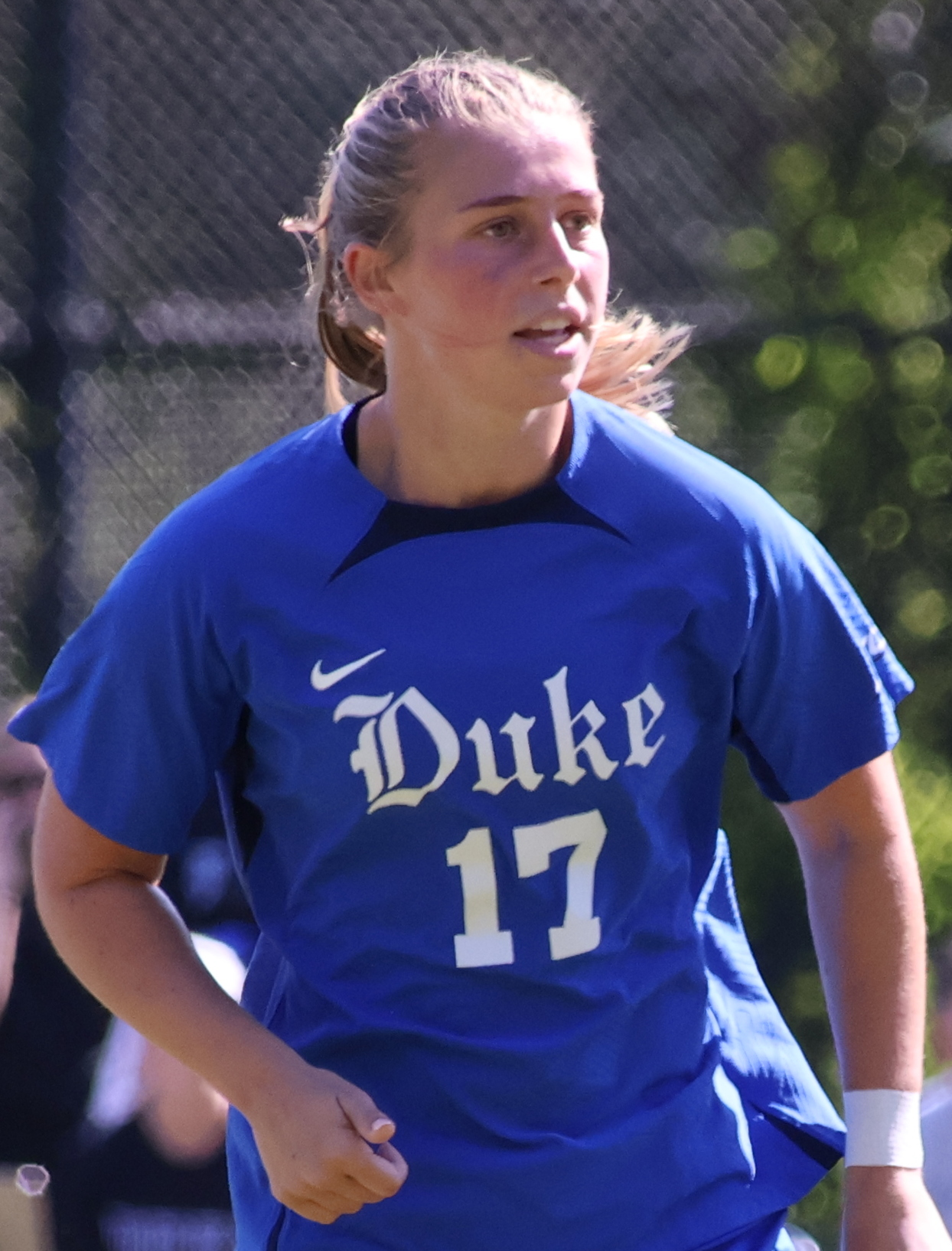
- Courtwright with Duke in 2026

Personal information
- Full name: Samantha Courtwright
- Date of birth: October 23, 2004 (age 22)
- Height: 5 ft 8 in (1.73 m)
- Position: Midfielder

Team information
- Current team: Duke Blue Devils
- Number: 17

Youth career
- DKSC

College career
Years	Team	Apps	(Gls)
2023–2025	Texas Tech Red Raiders	43	(9)
2026–	Duke Blue Devils	17	(7)

International career
2024	United States U20	8	(0)

Samantha Courtwright (born October 23, 2004) is an American college soccer player who plays as a midfielder for the Duke Blue Devils. She previously played for the Texas Tech Red Raiders and was named the Big 12 Freshman of the Year in 2023.

== Early life ==
Courtwright grew up in Dallas, the daughter of Carla and Greg Courtwright. She took after her older brother and began playing soccer when she was about three. She earned multiple ECNL all-conference honors with DKSC and was named ECNL All-American in 2022. She committed to Texas Tech during her junior year at the Hockaday School before graduating from Fusion Academy in 2023.

== College career ==
Courtwright started all 23 games, scoring 5 goals with 8 assists, in her freshman season with the Texas Tech Red Raiders in 2023. She contributed to the Red Raiders winning their first Big 12 Conference regular-season title and earning a two seed in the NCAA tournament, where they made the round of 16 for the second time in program history. Courtwright was named the Big 12 Freshman of the Year, first-team All-Big 12, and third-team All-American. TopDrawerSoccer ranked her as the fifth-best freshman in the nation. The next year, she suffered an anterior cruciate ligament injury during the 2024 preseason, missing the entire season and the 2024 FIFA U-20 Women's World Cup. While out of action, she signed a name, image, and likeness deal with Adidas, as one of the first six Texas Tech athletes to join Patrick Mahomes's Team Mahomes brand. She returned to the field as a redshirt sophomore in 2025, starting 20 games and scoring 4 goals with 7 assists, and was named first-team All-Big 12 for the second time. She then transferred to the Duke Blue Devils.

== International career ==
Courtwright was first called into training with the United States under-20 team in January 2024. She played in friendlies with the program throughout the year and was named to the squad for the 2024 FIFA U-20 Women's World Cup, but missed the tournament because of her ACL injury. She was called into a development camp, training concurrently with the senior national team, in January 2026.

== Honors and awards ==
Texas Tech Red Raiders

- Big 12 Conference: 2023

Individual

- Third-team All-American: 2023
- First-team All-Big 12: 2023, 2025
- Third-team All-ACC: 2026
- Big 12 Freshman of the Year: 2023
