= Macy Philippus =

American soccer player (born 2003)

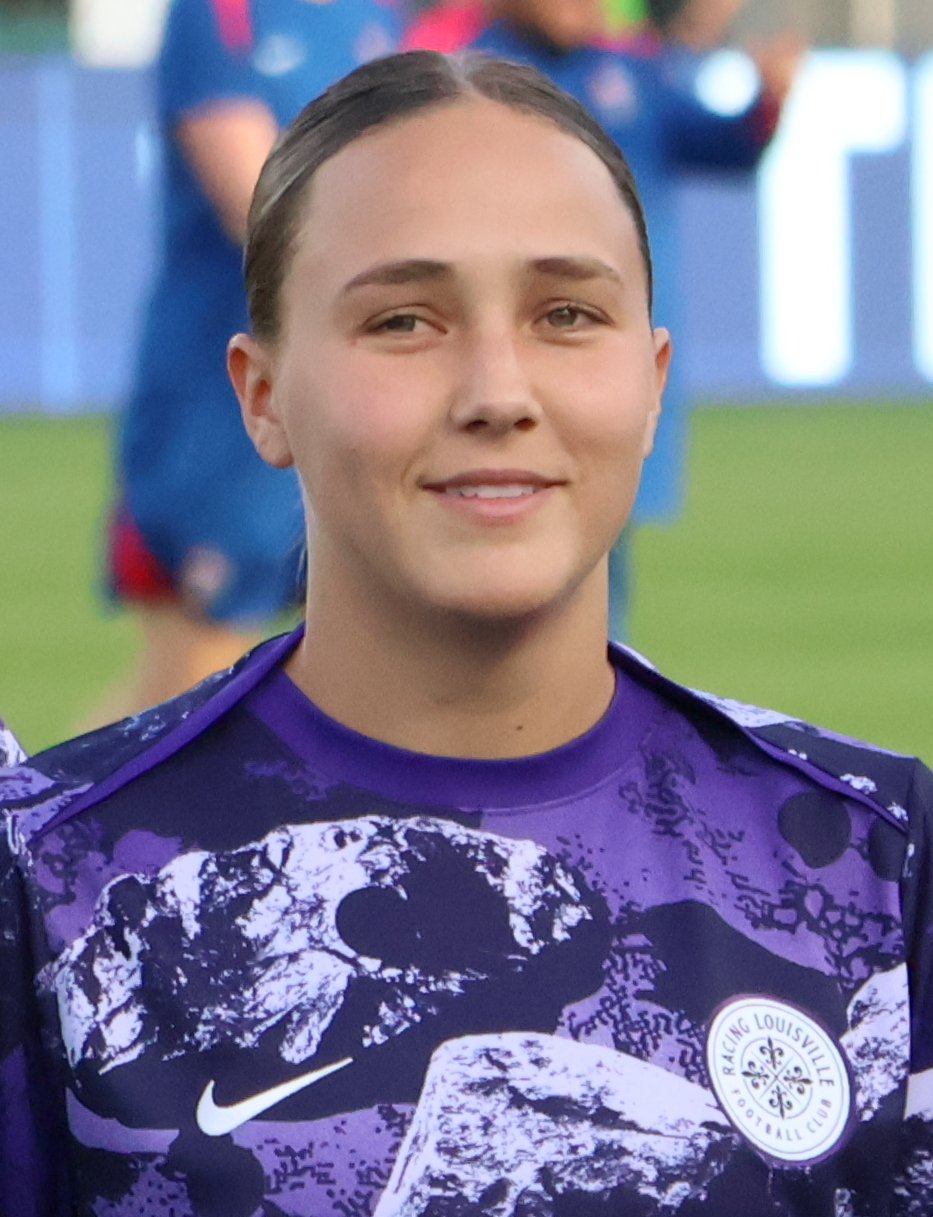
- Philippus with Racing Louisville in 2026

Personal information
- Birth name: Macy Irene Blackburn
- Date of birth: April 7, 2003 (age 23)
- Height: 5 ft 7 in (1.70 m)
- Position: Right back

Team information
- Current team: Racing Louisville
- Number: 23

Youth career
- Solar SC

College career
Years	Team	Apps	(Gls)
2021–2025	Texas Tech Red Raiders	77	(10)

Senior career*
Years	Team	Apps	(Gls)
2026–	Racing Louisville	8	(1)

International career^{‡}
2019	United States U-17	2	(0)
2026–	United States U-23	1	(0)
- * Club domestic league appearances and goals as of 05:58, November 2, 2026 (UTC) ‡ National team caps and goals as of 14:11, March 8, 2026 (UTC)

Macy Irene Philippus (née Blackburn; born April 7, 2003) is an American professional soccer player who plays as a right back for Racing Louisville FC of the National Women's Soccer League (NWSL). She played college soccer for the Texas Tech Red Raiders, setting the program record for career assists and earning All-American honors three times.

== Early life ==
Philippus grew up in the Dallas–Fort Worth city of Keller, Texas, the younger of two daughters born to Ryan and Bianca Blackburn. Her entire family went to Texas Tech University. She played club soccer for Solar SC, helping the team to the USYS under-14 national championship in 2016, the ECNL national title game in 2017, and the USSDA under-17 national title in 2019. She committed to Texas Tech in eighth grade. She graduated from Timber Creek High School in Fort Worth.

== College career ==
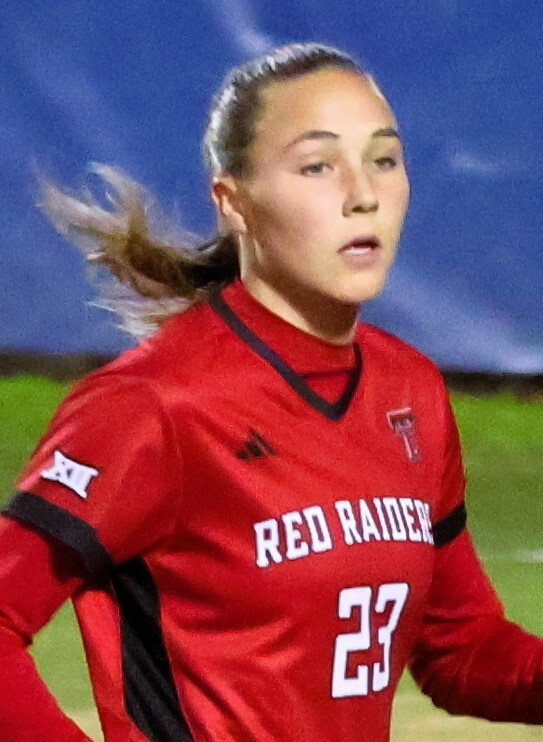
Philippus playing for Texas Tech in 2024

Philippus led the Texas Tech Red Raiders with 9 assists in 19 games in her freshman season in 2021, earning Big 12 Conference all-freshman honors. She missed most of her sophomore year after dislocating her right kneecap three games into the season. She returned to contribute 11 assists and 2 goals in 15 games in her junior season in 2023, being named first-team All-Big 12 and third-team All-American. However, she tore the anterior cruciate ligament (ACL) in her right knee and missed the last eight games of the year, sitting out as Texas Tech clinched their first Big 12 regular-season title in program history.

Philippus led the Red Raiders with 10 assists and added 2 goals in 19 games in 2024, being named first-team All-American, first-team All-Big 12, and the Big 12 Defender of the Year. During the season, she became the career assist leader in program history, passing Taylor Lytle's record. She made her NCAA tournament debut and made the second round. She returned as a reshirt senior in 2025, starting all 21 games and recording career highs with 5 goals and 13 assists. The team made a third consecutive NCAA tournament and reached the second round. She was named second-team All-American and repeated as first-team All-Big 12 and the Big 12 Defender of the Year.

== Club career ==
Racing Louisville FC announced on January 16, 2026, that they had signed Philippus to her first professional contract on a two-year deal. She made her professional debut as a late substitute for Quincy McMahon in a season-opening 2–1 loss to the North Carolina Courage on March 14. Later that month, she scored her first professional goal at the end of stoppage time in a 2–1 defeat to the Seattle Reign.

== International career ==
Philippus was called up to the United States youth national team at the under-15, under-17, and under-20 levels, appearing in two friendlies for the under-17s in 2019. She was called into a development camp, training concurrently with the senior national team, in January 2026.

== Personal life ==
She married Holden Philippus in June 2026.

== Honors and awards ==
Texas Tech Red Raiders

- Big 12 Conference: 2023

Individual

- First-team All-American: 2024
- Second-team All-American: 2025
- Third-team All-American: 2023
- First-team All-Big 12: 2023, 2024, 2025
- Big 12 Defender of the Year: 2024, 2025
- Big 12 all-freshman team: 2021
