= Madison White =

American soccer player (born 2001)

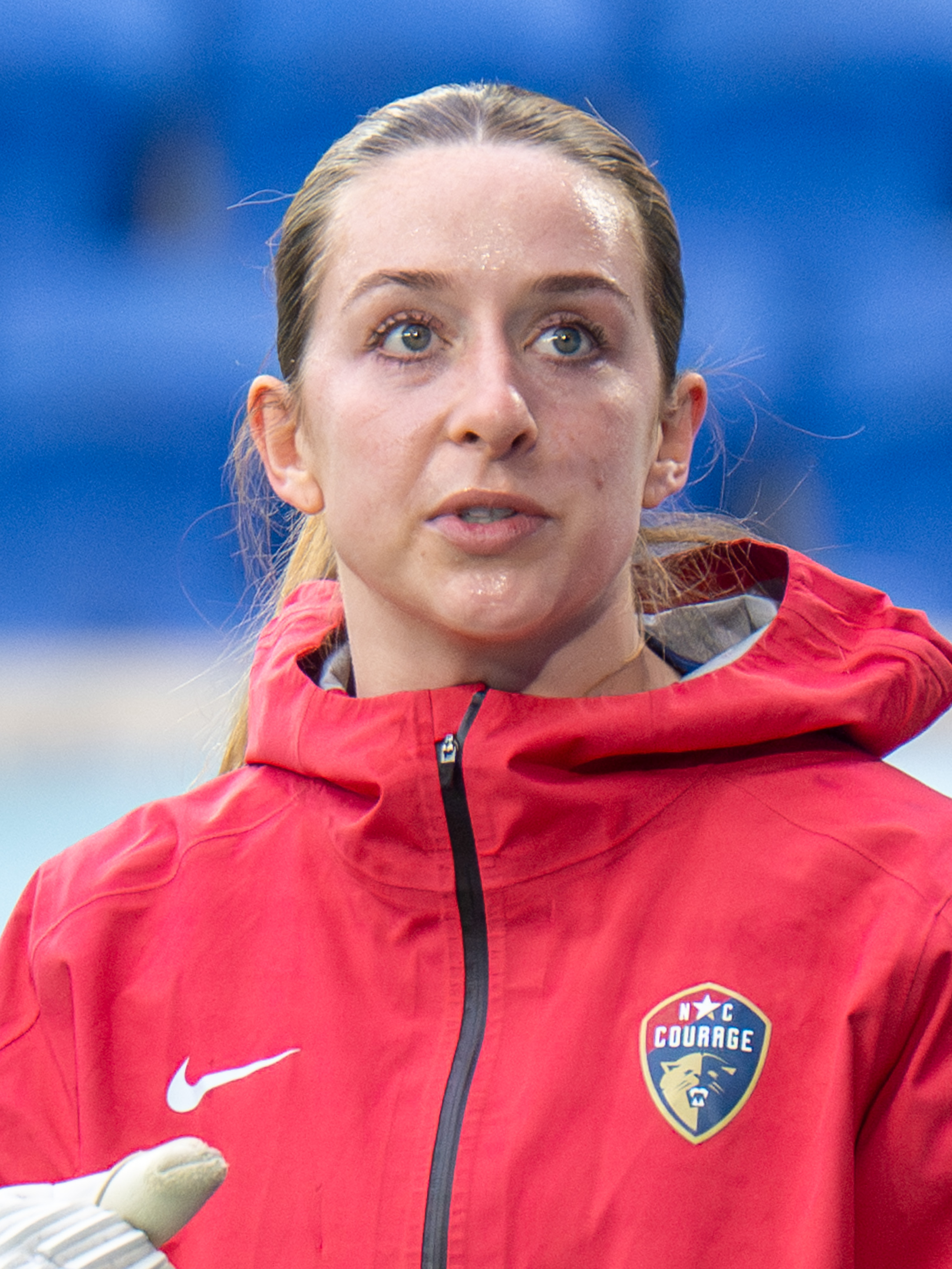
- White with the North Carolina Courage in 2026

Personal information
- Full name: Madison Grace White
- Date of birth: June 15, 2001 (age 25)
- Place of birth: Plano, Texas
- Height: 5 ft 11 in (1.80 m)
- Position: Goalkeeper

Team information
- Current team: North Carolina Courage
- Number: 0

Youth career
- Sting SC

College career
Years	Team	Apps	(Gls)
2019–2023	Texas Tech Red Raiders	85	(0)

Senior career*
Years	Team	Apps	(Gls)
2024–2025	Racing Louisville	0	(0)
2024–2025	→ Dallas Trinity (loan)	25	(0)
2026–	North Carolina Courage	0	(0)
- * Club domestic league appearances and goals as of June 30, 2025

Madison Grace White (born June 15, 2001) is an American professional soccer player who plays as a goalkeeper for the North Carolina Courage of the National Women's Soccer League (NWSL). She played college soccer for the Texas Tech Red Raiders, earning first-team All-American honors in 2023. She was selected by Racing Louisville in the fourth round of the 2024 NWSL Draft.

== Early life ==
White was raised in Plano and Rockwall, Texas. She played high school soccer at Bishop Lynch High School as a team member of the winning 2019 Class 6A TAPPS state championship. She was named 2019 TAPPS goalkeeper of the year. She also competed in high jump, winning three consecutive TAPPS state championships in 2017, 2018, and 2019. She played club soccer for Sting SC.

== College career ==
White became the starting goalkeeper for the Texas Tech Red Raiders as a freshman in 2019. She planned to redshirt her first year but was called into action against South Florida when Marissa Zucchetto was injured, making seven saves to win her debut. She contributed to her team's second-place finish in the Big 12 Conference, shutting out six conference opponents, and was named the Big 12 Freshman of the Year and first-team All-Big 12. In the first round of the 2019 NCAA championship, she made a career-high 11 saves in regulation and then saved two penalties in the shootout to advance past Pepperdine, but lost in the next round. White recorded a conference-best nine clean sheets as a senior in 2022, earning second-team All-Big 12 honors.

In the 2023 season, White helped lead the Red Raiders to their first Big 12 regular-season title in program history. She recorded career highs with 70 saves and 13 clean sheets (including eight consecutive home games), being named the Big 12 Goalkeeper of the Year, first-team All-Big 12, and first-team All-American by United Soccer Coaches. In the program's first NCAA championship appearance since her freshman year, she made a season-high six saves in regulation against Princeton and added a kick save in the shootout to make it to the third round, where they fell to North Carolina. White left Texas Tech as the program leader in career shutouts (39; previously held by Victoria Esson).

== Club career ==
=== Racing Louisville ===
White was drafted by Racing Louisville with the 54th overall pick in the fourth round of the 2024 NWSL Draft. On July 22, 2024, she signed with Louisville on a two-year contract. She was immediately loan out to USL Super League club Dallas Trinity for the league's inaugural season.

After returning from loan the following year, White made her only appearance for Louisville in their friendly against USL Super League club Lexington SC on July 13, 2025.

==== Dallas Trinity (loan) ====
White made her Trinity debut in their friendly against Barcelona at the Cotton Bowl on August 30, 2024. She soon won the starting job over Samantha Estrada and made her professional league debut against Brooklyn FC on September 25, saving a penalty kick from Hope Breslin in the 2–0 loss. Her save was later recognized as the Save of the Month. On October 16, she kept her first professional clean sheet, and Dallas's first as a club, in a 0–0 draw with DC Power FC. She played in 25 league games and led the USL with 9 clean sheets (tied with Hope Hisey) while ranking third in saves. Dallas finished third in the league and lost 2–1 to the Tampa Bay Sun in the playoff semifinals.

=== North Carolina Courage ===
On December 9, 2025, the North Carolina Courage announced that they had signed White to a three-year contract through 2028.

== Career statistics ==
=== College ===
Team	Season	Regular season			Big 12 Tournament		NCAA Tournament		Total	
Team	Season	Conference	Apps	Goals	Apps	Goals	Apps	Goals	Apps	Goals
Texas Tech Red Raiders	2019	Big 12	10	0	2	0	2	0	14	0
Texas Tech Red Raiders	2020–21	Big 12	9	0	—		—		9	0
Texas Tech Red Raiders	2021	Big 12	18	0	2	0	—		20	0
Texas Tech Red Raiders	2022	Big 12	18	0	1	0	—		19	0
Texas Tech Red Raiders	2023	Big 12	18	0	2	0	3	0	23	0
Total			73	0	7	0	5	0	85	0

=== Club ===
As of June 7, 2025

Club	Season	League			League Cup		Other		Total	
Club	Season	Division	Apps	Goals	Apps	Goals	Apps	Goals	Apps	Goals
Racing Louisville	2024	NWSL	0	0	0	0	—		0	0
Dallas Trinity FC (loan)	2024–25	USL Super League	25	0	1	0	—		26	0
Racing Louisville	2025	NWSL	0	0	0	0	0	0	0	0
Career total			25	0	1	0	0	0	26	0

== Honors and awards ==
Texas Tech Red Raiders

- Big 12 Conference: 2023

Individual

- USL Super League Team of the Month: October 2024
- First-team All-American: 2023
- First-team All-Big 12: 2019, 2023
- Second-team All-Big 12: 2022
- Big 12 Goalkeeper of the Year: 2023
- Big 12 Freshman of the Year: 2019
