= Hannah Anderson (soccer) =

American soccer player (born 2001)

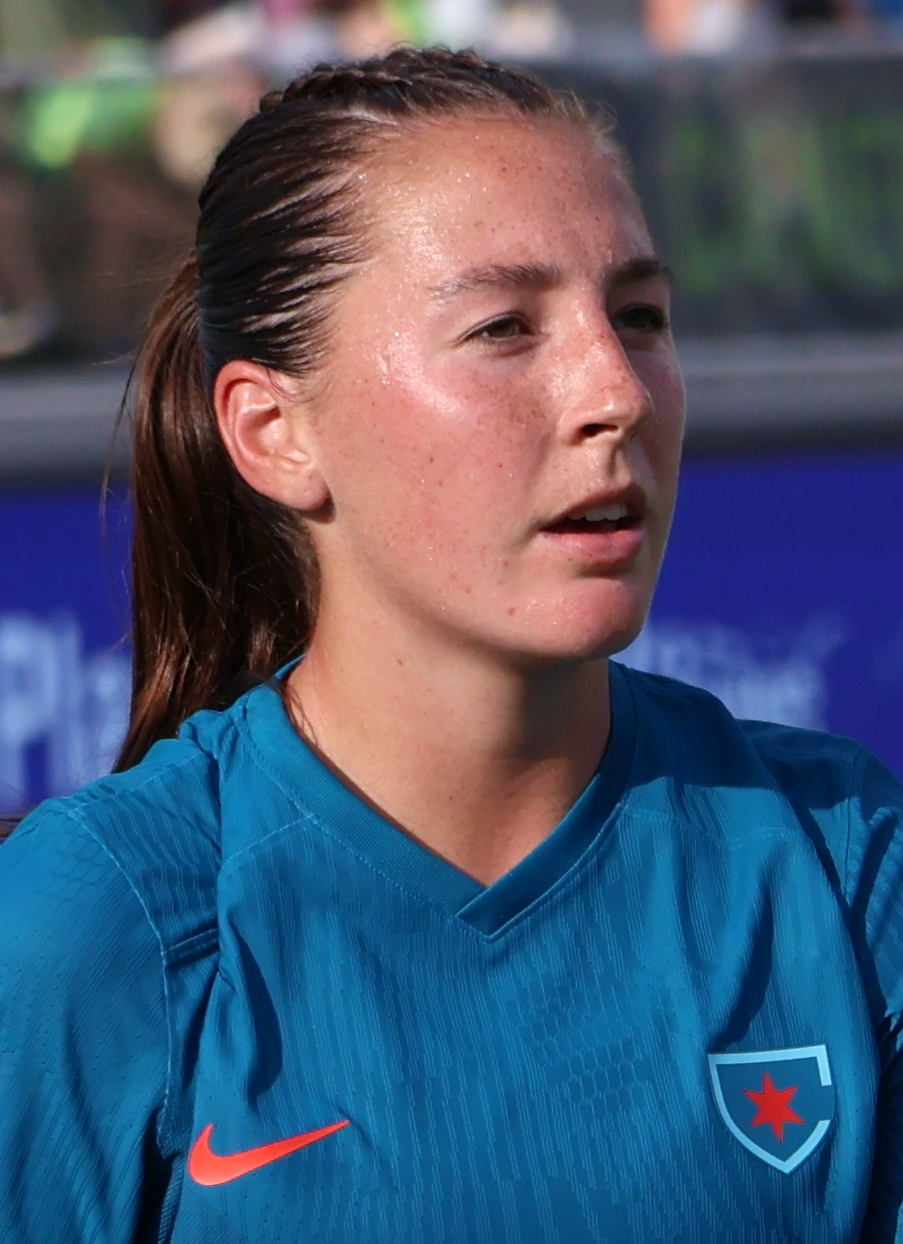
- Anderson with the Chicago Red Stars in 2024

Personal information
- Full name: Hannah Leigh Anderson
- Date of birth: April 3, 2001 (age 25)
- Place of birth: Plano, Texas, U.S.
- Height: 5 ft 10 in (1.78 m)
- Position: Center back

Team information
- Current team: Orlando Pride
- Number: 41

Youth career
- FC Dallas

College career
Years	Team	Apps	(Gls)
2019–2023	Texas Tech Red Raiders	96	(14)

Senior career*
Years	Team	Apps	(Gls)
2024–2025	Chicago Stars	27	(0)
2026–	Orlando Pride	20	(2)
- * Club domestic league appearances and goals as of 03:22, November 8, 2026 (UTC)

Hannah Leigh Anderson (born April 3, 2001) is an American professional soccer player who plays as a center back for the Orlando Pride of the National Women's Soccer League (NWSL). She played college soccer for the Texas Tech Red Raiders, earning first-team All-American honors in 2023. She was selected by Chicago Stars FC in the third round of the 2024 NWSL Draft.

== Early life ==
Anderson grew up in Plano, Texas, the middle of three children born to Russell Anderson and Suzy McAnally. Her father played kicker for the SMU football team, and her mother played for SMU basketball. Anderson lettered in her two years of high school soccer at Liberty High School in Frisco before playing only club soccer with FC Dallas's academy team.

== College career ==
Anderson started all 96 games for the Texas Tech Red Raiders for five years, scoring 14 goals from the backline. In 2019, she led the team's freshman class with four goals and was selected to the Big 12 Conference all-freshman team. She scored three goals as a junior in 2021 and two as a senior in 2022, being named first-team All-Big 12 in 2022.

Anderson returned as a graduate student in 2023, using a fifth year of eligibility due to the COVID-19 pandemic. She captained the Red Raiders to the Big 12 regular-season title for the first time in program history and earned their first NCAA tournament berth since 2019. She scored a career-high five goals, including three game winners, with one at the last second against Texas. The team advanced to the NCAA tournament third round before losing to North Carolina. Anderson was named the Big 12 Defender of the Year, first-team All-Big 12, and first-team All-American, and was one of five finalists for the Honda Sports Award.

== Club career ==
=== Chicago Stars ===
Anderson was drafted by the Chicago Red Stars (later renamed Chicago Stars FC) with the 31st overall pick in the third round of the 2024 NWSL Draft. She was signed to a one-year contract with the option to extend another year. She made her professional debut on May 25, coming on as an 81st-minute substitute for Maximiliane Rall in a 1–0 loss to Racing Louisville. On June 8, she made her next appearance and first professional start in a 2–1 loss to Bay FC at historic Wrigley Field, which drew a then NWSL record 35,038 fans. On August 28, she signed a three-year contract extension with the Stars, committing her future with the club through 2027. She finished her rookie season as a fixture for Chicago, appearing in 20 games in all competitions as the club placed eighth in the league, losing 4–1 to eventual double winners Orlando Pride in the playoff quarterfinals. The following season, she made only 11 appearances as the Stars finished last in the league.

=== Orlando Pride ===
On January 8, 2026, Anderson was traded to the Orlando Pride in exchange for US$70,000 in intraleague transfer funds, signing a new two-year contract through 2027. She debuted for the club on March 15, replacing Rafaelle Souza as a second-half substitute in their season-opening 2–1 defeat to the Seattle Reign. The following week, she made her first start for Orlando as Rafaelle missed the match with an injury, playing the full 90 minutes in a 1–1 draw with expansion team Denver Summit. In the next game, against her former club Chicago Stars, she scored her first professional goal by volleying the corner service from Lizbeth Ovalle to conclude a 3–0 victory at Martin Stadium. On July 10, she scored her first goal at Inter&Co Stadium with a header from Ally Lemos's corner as the Pride won 3–0 against the Kansas City Current.

== Honors and awards ==
Texas Tech Red Raiders

- Big 12 Conference: 2023

Individual

- First-team All-American: 2023
- Big 12 Defender of the Year: 2023
- First-team All-Big 12: 2022, 2023
- Big 12 all-freshman team: 2019
