= Jordan Nytes =

American soccer player (born 2004)

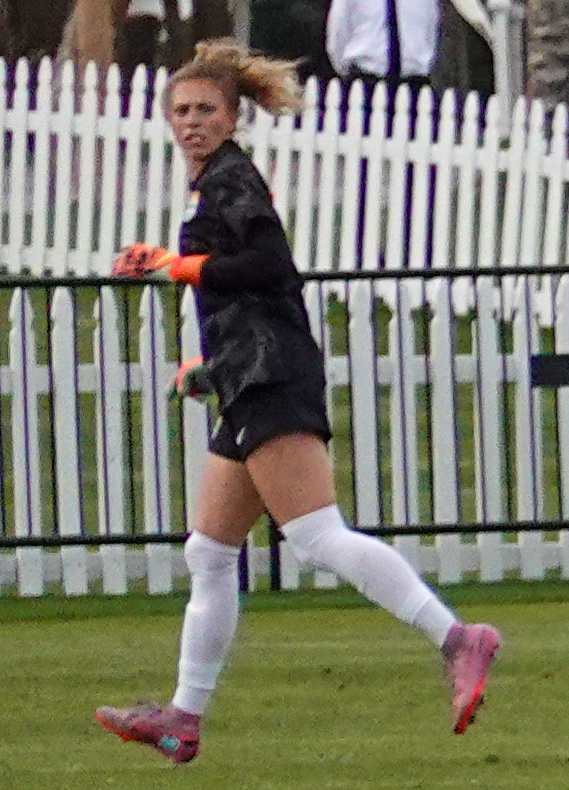
- Nytes with the Denver Summit in 2026

Personal information
- Date of birth: April 5, 2004 (age 22)
- Height: 5 ft 7 in (1.70 m)
- Position: Goalkeeper

Team information
- Current team: Denver Summit
- Number: 17

Youth career
- Real Colorado

College career
Years	Team	Apps	(Gls)
2022	Oklahoma State Cowgirls	17	(0)
2023–2025	Colorado Buffaloes	67	(0)

Senior career*
Years	Team	Apps	(Gls)
2026–	Denver Summit	0	(0)
- * Club domestic league appearances and goals

Jordan Nytes (born April 5, 2004) is an American professional soccer player who plays as a goalkeeper for Denver Summit FC of the National Women's Soccer League (NWSL). She played college soccer for the Oklahoma State Cowgirls and the Colorado Buffaloes, earning first-team All-American honors in 2025. She was named the Big 12 Goalkeeper of the Year three times.

== Early life ==
Nytes grew up in Aurora, Colorado, the daughter of Kevin and Kelli Nytes. She was named the Colorado Gatorade Player of the Year in 2022 after leading Grandview High School to the Class 5A state title and posting 15 shutouts in 20 games in her senior season. She played club soccer for Real Colorado, earning ECNL all-conference honors.

== College career ==
Nytes began college with the Oklahoma State Cowgirls, starting 17 games and posting 6 shutouts (plus 3 combined shutouts) in her freshman season in 2022. She was named first-team All-Big 12 and shared the Big 12 Goalkeeper of the Year award with West Virginia's Kayza Massey. She then transferred to the Colorado Buffaloes in her home state, starting all 21 games and keeping 8 clean sheets in her debut season in 2023. She helped the team qualify for the NCAA tournament for the first time in two years. She entered her junior season as team captain while the program moved to the Big 12 from the Pac-12 Conference. She kept 11 clean sheets in 22 games (seventh in the nation) in 2024, including a program record shutout streak over five games. She was named Big 12 Goalkeeper of the Year for the second time and was tabbed first-team All-Big 12 and third-team All-American. She kept 7 clean sheets in 24 games as a senior in 2025, helping the Buffaloes to third in the conference. The team set multiple program records including most wins and made the NCAA tournament third round. She won the Big 12 Goalkeeper of the Year award for a third time and was named first-team All-Big 12 and first-team All-American.

== Club career ==
NWSL expansion team Denver Summit FC announced on January 16, 2026, that they had signed Nytes to her first professional contract on a one-year deal.

== International career ==
Nytes was called into training camp with the United States under-20 team in January 2024.

== Honors and awards ==
Individual

- First-team All-American: 2025
- Third-team All-American: 2024
- First-team All-Big 12: 2022, 2024, 2025
- Big 12 Goalkeeper of the Year: 2022, 2024, 2025
