= Texas Tech Red Raiders women's soccer =

American college soccer team

- Founded: 1994; 32 years ago
- University: Texas Tech University
- Head coach: Tom Stone (20th season)
- Conference: Big 12
- Location: Lubbock, Texas, US
- Stadium: John Walker Soccer Complex (capacity: 1,500)
- Nickname: Red Raiders
- Colors: Scarlet and black
Home	Away

NCAA tournament Round of 16
- 2014, 2023

NCAA tournament Round of 32
- 2012, 2013, 2014, 2015, 2018, 2019, 2023, 2024, 2025, 2026

NCAA tournament appearances
- 2012, 2013, 2014, 2015, 2016, 2018, 2019, 2023, 2024, 2025, 2026

Conference tournament championships
- 2015

Conference regular season championships
- 2023

The Texas Tech Red Raiders are the intercollegiate women's soccer team representing Texas Tech University. The Red Raiders compete in Division I of the National Collegiate Athletic Association (NCAA) as a charter member of the Big 12 Conference. The first team was fielded in 1994, and they play their home games at the John Walker Soccer Complex on the university's campus in Lubbock, Texas. Since 2007, the Red Raiders have been led by head coach Tom Stone.

The Red Raiders have played in the NCAA Division I Women's Soccer Championship nine times since their first appearance in 2012.

Their outstanding performance in 2023 earned them the 9th spot in the final United Soccer Coaches Association poll. This top-10 finish is the best a Texas Tech team has ever secured in the program's history.

== Players ==
=== Current roster ===
As of November 2026

Note: Flags indicate national team as defined under FIFA eligibility rules; some limited exceptions apply. Players may hold more than one non-FIFA nationality.

No.	Pos.	Nation	Player
0	GK	USA	Cooper Dick
00	GK	USA	Claire Benoist
1	GK	USA	Addie Todd
2	MF	USA	Raleigh Greason
3	DF	USA	Kylie Bahr
4	DF	USA	Emma Fassora
5	DF	USA	Eleanor Hays
6	DF	USA	Emilie McCartney
7	FW	USA	Alana Harry
8	MF	USA	Skylar Haase
9	FW	USA	Carolina Krosnyak
10	MF	USA	Emma Torres
11	MF	USA	Chloe Soto
13	FW	USA	Storie Sexton

No.	Pos.	Nation	Player
14	MF	ENG	Millie Elwood
16	FW	USA	Taylor Zdrojewski
17	MF	USA	Lauren Alvarez
19	MF	USA	Jules Burrows
20	DF	USA	Mia Wiele
21	DF	USA	Reese Liner
22	DF	USA	Abbi Sine
24	FW	USA	Madi Patterson
27	FW	USA	Mattie Neves
29	FW	ISL	Diana Asta Gudmundsdottir
30	MF	USA	Sophie Neves
31	DF	USA	Logan Pang
33	FW	USA	Kaitlyn Giametta
41	MF	USA	Gianna Gregoire

=== Individual awards ===
All-Americans
No.	Player	Year
9	Madison White	2023 (1st team)
23	Macy Blackburn	2023 (3rd team), 2024 (1st team)
22	Sam Courtwright	2023 (Freshman)
14	Hannah Anderson	2023 (1st team)
22	Kirsten Davis	2019 (1st team), 2021(1st team)
12	Cassie Hiatt	2019 (3rd team)
12	Janine Beckie	2012 (2nd team), 2013 (1st team), 2014 (1st team)
15	Jaelene Hinkle	2013 (3rd team), 2014 (Academic All American 1st team)

All Conference
Player	Year	Honors received
Kylie Bahr	2025 (1st team)	2022 All-Big 12 Newcomer Team
Faith Nguyen	2024 (1st team); 2025 (2nd team)	
Peyton Parsons	2024 (1st team); 2025 (1st team)	2024 NSCAA/USC All-Region 1st team
Taylor Zdrojewski	2024 (2nd team); 2025 (1st team)	2025 NSCAA/USC All-Region 2nd team
Macy Blackburn	2023 (1st team); 2024 (1st team); 2025 (1st team)	2025 Big 12 Defender of the Year 2024 Big 12 Defender of the Year 2023 NSCAA/USC All-Region 1st team 2021 NSCAA/USC All-Region 2nd team
Ashleigh Williams	2022 (2nd team); 2023 (1st team)	2022 NSCAA/USC All-Region 3rd team
Sam Courtwright	2023 (1st team); 2025 (1st team)	2023 Big 12 Freshman of the Year 2023 All-Big 12 Newcomer Team 2023 NSCAA/USC All-Region 1st team 2025 NSCAA/USC All-Region 2nd team
Hannah Anderson	2023 (1st team)	2023 Big 12 Defender of the Year; 2023 All-Big 12 Championship team 2022 NSCAA/USC All-Region 2nd team 2019 NSCAA/USC All-Region 3rd team
Kirsten Davis	2019 (1st team); 2020 (1st team); 2021 (1st team)	2021 Big 12 Offensive Most Valuable Player 2021 NSCAA/USC All-Region 1st team 2019 Big 12 Offensive Most Valuable Player 2019 NSCAA/USC All-Region 1st team 2018 - All Big 12 Championship Team
Madison White	2019 (1st team); 2022 (2nd team); 2023 (1st team)	2023 Big 12 Goalkeeper of the Year 2023 NSCAA/USC All-Region 1st team 2019 Big 12 Freshman of the Year
Lauren Watson	2014 (2nd team); 2016 (1st team)	2014 NSCAA/USC All-Region 3rd team 2015 All-Big 12 Championship Team 2015 Big 12 Defensive Most Valuable Player
Victoria Esson	2013 (1st team)	2011 All-Big 12 Newcomer Team
Morgan Johnson	2012 (1st team)	
Janine Beckie	2012 (1st team); 2013 (1st team); 2014 (1st team)	2015 Big 12 Offensive Most Valuable Player; 2015 Big 12 Player of the Year; 2014 Big 12 Player of the Year 2014 NSCAA/USC All-Region 1st team 2013 NSCAA/USC All-Region 1st team 2012 NSCAA/USC All-Region 1st team 2012 Big 12 Freshman of the Year
Paige Strahan	2012 (1st team); 2013 (2nd team)	2014 NSCAA/USC All-Region 2nd team 2012 NSCAA/USC All-Region 3rd team
Morgan Johnson	2012 (1st team)	
Jaelene Hinkle	2011 (2nd team); 2012 (1st team)	
Jessica Fuston	2010 (2nd team)	2010 Big 12 Freshman of the Year
Taylor Lytle	2008 (2nd team); 2009 (1st team); 2011 (2nd team)	
Jennifer Hamm	1998 (1st team); 1999 (2nd team)	1999 NSCAA/USC All-Region 3rd team 1997 NSCAA/USC All-Region 2nd team
Kristi Patterson	1996 (1st team)	1996 All-Southwest Conference 1st Team

== Individual records ==
Career Goals
Player	Years	Goals
Janine Beckie	2012–15	57
Kirsten Davis	2017–21	45
Kristy Frantz	1996–99	41
Ashleigh Williams	2021–24	31
Kristi Patterson	1994–96	30

Season Goals
Player	Year	Goals
Kristy Frantz	1996	18
Janine Beckie	2014	17
Taylor Zdrojewski	2025	16
Kirsten Davis	2019	16
Ashleigh Williams	2023	14
Kirsten Davis	2021	14
Janine Beckie	2015	14
Janine Beckie	2012	14
Kristy Frantz	1997	14

Career Assists
Player	Years	Assists
Macy Blackburn	2021–25	46
Taylor Lytle	2008–11	27
Kristy Frantz	1996–99	26
Ali Murphy	2023–25	18
Kirsten Davis	2017–21	22

Season Assists
Player	Year	Assists
Macy Blackburn	2025	13
Alli Murphy	2014	12
Macy Blackburn	2023	11
Taylor Lytle	2009	11
Macy Blackburn	2024	10

Career Points
Player	Years	Points
Janine Beckie	2012–15	130
Kirsten Davis	2017–21	112
Kristy Frantz	1996–99	108
Ashleigh Williams	2021–24	81
Kristi Patterson	1994–96	78

Season Points
Player	Year	Points
Kristy Frantz	1996	44
Janine Beckie	2014	38
Taylor Zdrojewski	2025	35
Ashleigh Williams	2024	34
Kirsten Davis	2021	34

Career Saves
Player	Years	Saves
Brittany Peese	1998–01	329
Tina Rincon	2004–08	305
Megan Knauss	2002–05	266
Madison White	2019-23	263
Lauren Watson	2013–16	254

Season Saves
Player	Year	Saves
Stephanie Carter	1995	141
Brittany Peese	2001	104
Lauren Watson	2015	98
Lizzie Pruitt	1996	97
Tina Rincon	2007	96

== Coaches ==
=== Current staff ===
Position	Name
Head coach	(United States) Tom Stone
Assistant coach	(England) Nick Hallam
Assistant coach	(United States) Charlotte Masters
Assistant coach/ Goalkeeper coach	(United States) Brock Duckworth
Director of Soccer Operations	(United States) Sophia Scholz

=== Coaching Awards ===
Name	Award(s)
Tom Stone	2023 Big 12 Coach of the Year

== Season-by-season results ==
Season	Coach	Overall	Conference	Standing	Postseason
Independent (1994)
1994	Diane Nichols	9–5–1			
Southwest Conference (1995)
1995	Diane Nichols	12–7–2	1–3–0		
Big 12 Conference (1996–present)
1996	Diane Nichols	13–8–0	5–4–0	4th	
Diane Nichols:		34–20–3	6–7–0		
1997	Felix Oskam	7–11–0	4–6–0	7th	
1998	Felix Oskam	7–7–3	3–5–2	7th	
1999	Felix Oskam	8–11–1	4–6–0	8th	
2000	Felix Oskam	4–14–0	2–8–0	10th	
2001	Felix Oskam	4–15–0	0–10–0	11th	
2002	Felix Oskam	2–17–0	0–10–0	11th	
2003	Felix Oskam	3–13–1	2–8–0	11th	
2004	Felix Oskam	3–16–0	0–10–0	11th	
Felix Oskam:		38–101–6	17–61–2		
2005	Neil McGuire	1–18–0	0–10–0	11th	
2006	Neil McGuire	7–11–2	2–7–1	9th	
Neil McGuire:		9–29–2	2–17–1		
2007	Tom Stone	7–8–2	5–4–1	5th	
2008	Tom Stone	8–10–1	3–7–0	8th	
2009	Tom Stone	8–8–4	3–4–3	T-7th	
2010	Tom Stone	11–8–1	4–5–1	T-5th	
2011	Tom Stone	10–8–2	3–4–1	T-4th	
2012	Tom Stone	16–6–1	5–2–1	3rd	NCAA Round of 32
2013	Tom Stone	18–2–3	6–0–2	2nd	NCAA Round of 32
2014	Tom Stone	16–4–2	4–3–1	4th	NCAA Round of 16
2015	Tom Stone	15–4–5	3–2–3	T-4th	Big 12 Tournament; NCAA Round of 32
2016	Tom Stone	9–9–2	2–6–0	8th	Big 12 Tournament; NCAA First Round
2017	Tom Stone	9–7–3	2–4–3	7th	Big 12 Tournament
2018	Tom Stone	14–5–3	5–3–1	T-3rd	Big 12 Tournament; NCAA Round of 32
2019	Tom Stone	15-4-3	6-1-2	2nd	Big 12 Tournament; NCAA Round of 32
2020	Tom Stone	5-6-2	2-5-2	7th	
2021	Tom Stone	11-6-3	4-4-1	5th	
2022	Tom Stone	9-4-6	5-1-3	T-2nd	
2023	Tom Stone	16-2-5	8-0-2	1st	Big 12 Champions Big 12 Tournament; NCAA Sweet 16
2024	Tom Stone	15-5-2	8-1-2	2nd	Big 12 Tournament; NCAA Round of 32
2025	Tom Stone	14-2-5	7-1-3	4th	Big 12 Tournament; NCAA Round of 32
2026	Tom Stone	13-2-4	8-2-1	2nd	
Tom Stone:		238-110-59	98-61-33		
Total:		342–261–68			
National champion Postseason invitational champion Conference regular season champion Conference regular season and conference tournament champion Division regular season champion Division regular season and conference tournament champion Conference tournament champion
