= Big 12 Conference women's soccer tournament =

- Sport: Soccer
- Conference: Big 12 Conference
- Number of teams: 16
- Format: Single-elimination tournament
- Current stadium: Texas Health Mansfield Stadium
- Current location: Mansfield, Texas
- Played: 1996–present
- Last contest: 2026
- Current champion: BYU (2nd title)
- Most championships: West Virginia; Nebraska; Texas A&M (5 titles each)
- TV partner: ESPN+
- Official website: big12sports.com/soc

Host stadiums
- List: World Wide Technology Soccer Park (1996); Blossom Athletic Center (1997–2012); Swope Soccer Village (2013–2019); Round Rock Multipurpose Complex (2021–2023); CPKC Stadium (2024); Garvey-Rosenthal Soccer Stadium & Betty Lou Mays Soccer Field (2025); Texas Health Mansfield Stadium (2026)

Host locations
- List: St. Louis, Missouri (1996); San Antonio, Texas (1997–2012); Kansas City, Missouri (2013–2019, 2024); Round Rock, Texas (2021–2023); Fort Worth, Texas & Waco, Texas (2025); Mansfield, Texas (2026)

The Big 12 Conference women's soccer tournament is the postseason women's soccer tournament for the Big 12 Conference. The 7-match tournament was held at Garvey-Rosenthal Soccer Stadium and Betty Lou Mays Soccer Field in Fort Worth, Texas and Waco, Texas for the 2025 season, while it would be held at Texas Health Mansfield Stadium in Mansfield, Texas for the 2026 season. It also would expand to sixteen teams with the addition of Arizona, Arizona State, Colorado and Utah.

West Virginia, alongside former conference members Nebraska and Texas A&M share the record for most tournament championships at 5. The most recent champions is BYU after winning the 2025 tournament. In 1996, the inaugural conference tournament was held at World Wide Technology Soccer Park in St. Louis. Blossom Athletic Center in San Antonio, Texas held the tournament from 1997 to 2012 and Swope Soccer Village in Kansas City held the tournament from 2013 to 2019 and at CPKC Stadium in Kansas City, Missouri, for 2024.

The 8-team single-elimination tournament consists of teams playing quarterfinals matches with teams being seeded one through eight playing in a bracket style tournament.

== Winners ==
Key

- (1) – Title number
- a.e.t. – Match went to extra time
- p – Match decided by a penalty shootout after extra time
- – Winning team won regular season
- – Winning team won National Championship

=== Finals ===
Ed.	Year	Champion	Score	Runner-up	Venue / city	Att.	Off. MVP	Def. MVP
1	1996	Nebraska (1)	1–0 (a.e.t.)	Texas A&M	World Wide Technology Soccer Park • St. Louis, MO	240	Courtney Saunders (Baylor)	Tina Robinson (Texas A&M)
2	1997	Texas A&M (1)	3–1	Nebraska	Blossom Athletic Center • San Antonio, TX	6,469	Sharon Pickering (Texas A&M)	Claire Elliott (Texas A&M)
3	1998	Nebraska (2)	4–0	Missouri	Blossom Athletic Center • San Antonio, TX	3,904	Isabelle Morneau (Nebraska)	
4	1999	Nebraska (3)	2–1	Missouri	Blossom Athletic Center • San Antonio, TX	6,101	Erica Florez (Iowa State)	Sharolta Nonen (Nebraska)
5	2000	Nebraska (4)	4–1	Texas A&M	Blossom Athletic Center • San Antonio, TX	3,999	Christine Latham (Nebraska)	Amber Reynolds (Texas A&M)
6	2001	Texas A&M (2)	1–0	Texas	Blossom Athletic Center • San Antonio, TX	7,482	Linsey Johnson (Texas A&M)	Laura Kram (Texas)
7	2002	Nebraska (5)	1–0	Texas A&M	Blossom Athletic Center • San Antonio, TX	6,809	Christine Latham (Nebraska)	Christy Harms (Nebraska)
8	2003	Oklahoma State (1)	3–2 (a.e.t.)	Missouri	Blossom Athletic Center • San Antonio, TX	4,293	Cassie Lewis (Oklahoma State)	Kathrin Lehmann (Oklahoma State)
9	2004	Texas A&M (3)	2–0	Texas	Blossom Athletic Center • San Antonio, TX	7,606	Kelly Wilson (Texas)	Kati Jo Spisak (Texas A&M)
10	2005	Texas A&M (4)	2–1	Colorado	Blossom Athletic Center • San Antonio, TX	6,768	Paige Carmichael (Texas A&M)	Ashlee Pistorius (Texas A&M)
11	2006	Texas (1)	1–1 (5–4 p)	Colorado	Blossom Athletic Center • San Antonio, TX	4,479	Kelsey Carpenter (Texas)	Dianna Pfenninger (Texas)
12	2007	Texas (2)	2–1	Texas A&M	Blossom Athletic Center • San Antonio, TX	8,243	Dianna Pfenninger (Texas)	Kasey Moore (Texas)
13	2008	Missouri (1)	1–0	Colorado	Blossom Athletic Center • San Antonio, TX	5,216	Alysha Bonnick (Missouri)	Tasha Dittamore (Missouri)
14	2009	Oklahoma State (2)	1–0	Texas A&M	Blossom Athletic Center • San Antonio, TX	6,750	Rachel Shipley (Texas A&M)	Melinda Mercado (Oklahoma State)
15	2010	Oklahoma State (3)	1–1 (5–4 p)	Oklahoma	Blossom Athletic Center • San Antonio, TX	3,362	Morgan Marlborough (Nebraska)	Melinda Mercado (Oklahoma State)
16	2011	Texas A&M (5)	1–0	Oklahoma State	Blossom Athletic Center • San Antonio, TX	4,903	Kelley Monogue (Texas A&M)	Adrianna Franch (Oklahoma State)
17	2012	Baylor (1)	4–1	TCU	Blossom Athletic Center • San Antonio, TX	2,928	Dana Larsen (Baylor)	Vittoria Arnold (TCU)
18	2013	West Virginia (1)	1–0	Oklahoma State	Swope Soccer Village • Kansas City, MO	2,787	Frances Silva (West Virginia)	Kadeisha Buchanan (West Virginia)
19	2014	West Virginia (2)	1–0	Oklahoma	Swope Soccer Village • Kansas City, MO	2,451	Ashley Lawrence (West Virginia)	Kadeisha Buchanan (West Virginia)
20	2015	Texas Tech (1)	1–0	Kansas	Swope Soccer Village • Kansas City, MO	2,812	Janine Beckie (Texas Tech)	Lauren Watson (Texas Tech)
21	2016	West Virginia (3)	3–2	TCU	Swope Soccer Village • Kansas City, MO	2,572	Ashley Lawrence (West Virginia)	Kadeisha Buchanan (West Virginia)
22	2017	Baylor (2)	1–0 (a.e.t.)	TCU	Swope Soccer Village • Kansas City, MO	2,279	Aline De Lima (Baylor)	Katie Lund (TCU)
23	2018	West Virginia (4)	3–0	Baylor	Swope Soccer Village • Kansas City, MO	2,138	Sh'Nia Gordon (West Virginia)	Easther Mayi Kith (West Virginia)
24	2019	Kansas (1)	1–0	TCU	Swope Soccer Village • Kansas City, MO	2,025	Messiah Bright (TCU)	Sarah Peters (Kansas)
25	2021	TCU (1)	2–1	Texas	Round Rock Multipurpose Complex • Round Rock, TX	4,295	Messiah Bright (TCU)	Jenna Winebrenner (TCU)
26	2022	West Virginia (5)	1–0 (a.e.t.)	TCU	Round Rock Multipurpose Complex • Round Rock, TX	1,715	Lauren Segalla (West Virginia)	Jordan Brewster (West Virginia)
27	2023	Texas (3)	3–1	BYU	Round Rock Multipurpose Complex • Round Rock, TX	1,032	Lexi Missimo (Texas)	Mia Justus (Texas)
28	2024	Kansas (2)	1–0	TCU	CPKC Stadium • Kansas City, MO	n/a	Lexi Watts (Kansas)	Sophie Dawe (Kansas)
29	2025	BYU (1)	1–0	Kansas	Betty Lou Mays Soccer Field • Waco, TX	2,501	Ellie Walbruch (BYU)	Chelsea Peterson (BYU)
30	2026	BYU (2)	3–2	Baylor	Texas Health Mansfield Stadium • Mansfield, Texas	1,540	Mattyn Summers-Oviatt (BYU)	Chelsea Peterson (BYU)

== Titles by school ==
As of 2026 Tournament

School	App.	Rec.	Pct.	Finals	Titles	Winning years
Arizona	1	0–1–0	.000	0	0	—
Arizona State	1	0–1–0	.000	0	0	—
Baylor	22	18–18–2	.500	4	2	2012, 2017
BYU	4	6–2–3	.682	3	2	2025, 2026
UCF	3	1–3–0	.250	0	0	—
Cincinnati	2	1–1–0	.500	0	0	—
Colorado	15	10–12–3	.460	3	0	—
Houston	1	0–1–0	.000	0	0	—
Iowa State	11	0–9–3	.125	0	0	—
Kansas	22	14–14–0	.500	4	2	2019, 2024
Kansas State	1	0–1–0	.000	0	0	—
Oklahoma State	19	13–12–3	.518	5	3	2003, 2009, 2010
TCU	13	10–8–8	.538	7	1	2021
Texas Tech	20	8–17–3	.339	1	1	2015
Utah	1	0–1–0	.000	0	0	—
West Virginia	14	15–7–3	.660	5	5	2013, 2014, 2016, 2018, 2022

== Former members ==
School	App.	Rec.	Pct.	Finals	Titles	Winning years
Missouri	14	11–12–2	.480	4	1	2008
Nebraska	14	18–8–0	.692	6	5	1996, 1998, 1999, 2000, 2002
Oklahoma	16	7–17–0	.292	2	0	—
Texas	25	17–19–6	.476	6	3	2006, 2007, 2023
Texas A&M	16	22–9–3	.691	10	5	1997, 2001, 2004, 2005, 2011

Teams in italics no longer sponsor women's soccer in the Big 12.
