= 2006 Big 12 Conference women's soccer tournament =

Collegiate women's soccer tournament

- Classification: Division I
- Teams: 8
- Matches: 7
- Attendance: 4,479
- Site: Blossom Athletic Center; San Antonio, TX
- Champions: Texas (1st title)
- Winning coach: Chris Petrucelli (1st title)

2006 Big 12 Conference women's soccer standings
	Conf.						Overall
Team	W		L		T	PCT	W		L		T	PCT
No. 5 Texas A&M ‍†‍‍^{y}	9	–	1	–	0	.900	17	–	6	–	1	.729
No. 17 Oklahoma State ‍‍‍^{y}	8	–	1	–	1	.850	17	–	3	–	3	.804
No. 8 Texas ‍‍‡‍^{y}	8	–	1	–	1	.850	18	–	4	–	3	.780
Kansas ‍‍‍	6	–	4	–	0	.600	11	–	7	–	1	.605
No. 12 Colorado ‍‍‍^{y}	5	–	4	–	1	.550	14	–	6	–	4	.667
Nebraska ‍‍‍	4	–	5	–	1	.450	10	–	7	–	3	.575
Oklahoma ‍‍‍	3	–	6	–	1	.350	8	–	11	–	1	.425
Baylor ‍‍‍	3	–	7	–	0	.300	6	–	12	–	1	.342
Texas Tech ‍‍‍	2	–	7	–	1	.250	7	–	11	–	2	.400
Missouri ‍‍‍	2	–	8	–	0	.200	10	–	9	–	0	.526
Iowa State ‍‍‍	2	–	8	–	0	.200	6	–	14	–	0	.300
† – Conference champion ‡ – Tournament champion y – Invited to the NCAA tournament Rankings from NSCAA Coaches

The 2006 Big 12 Conference women's soccer tournament was the postseason women's soccer tournament for the Big 12 Conference held from November 1 to 5, 2006. The 7-match tournament was held at the Blossom Athletic Center in San Antonio, TX with a combined attendance of 4,479. The 8-team single-elimination tournament consisted of three rounds based on seeding from regular season conference play. The Texas Longhorns defeated the Colorado Buffaloes in the championship match to win their 1st conference tournament.

== Regular season standings ==
Place	Seed	Team	Conference					Overall			
Place	Seed	Team	W	L	T	%	Pts	W	L	T	%
1	1	Texas A&M	9	1	0	.900	27	17	6	1	.729
2	2	Oklahoma State	8	1	1	.850	25	17	3	3	.804
2	3	Texas	8	1	1	.850	25	18	4	3	.780
4	4	Kansas	6	4	0	.600	18	11	7	1	.605
5	5	Colorado	5	4	1	.550	16	14	6	4	.667
6	6	Nebraska	4	5	1	.450	13	10	7	3	.575
7	7	Oklahoma	3	6	1	.350	10	8	11	1	.425
8	8	Baylor	3	7	0	.300	9	6	12	1	.342
9		Texas Tech	2	7	1	.250	7	7	11	2	.400
10		Missouri	2	8	0	.200	6	10	9	0	.526
10		Iowa State	2	8	0	.200	6	6	14	0	.300

== Bracket ==
Quarterfinals; Wednesday, Nov 1
1	Texas A&M	3
8	Baylor	0
4	Kansas	1 (3)
5	Colorado	1 (5)
2	Oklahoma State	2
7	Oklahoma	1
3	Texas	1^{OT}
6	Nebraska	0^{OT}

Semifinals; Friday, Nov 3
1	Texas A&M	2^{2OT}
5	Colorado	3^{2OT}
2	Oklahoma State	0
3	Texas	2

Final; Sunday, Nov 5
5	Colorado	1 (4)
3	Texas	1 (5)

== Awards ==
=== Most valuable player ===
- Offensive MVP – Kelsey Carpenter – Texas
- Defensive MVP – Dianna Pfenninger – Texas

=== All-Tournament team ===
Position	Player	Team
GK	Dianna Pfenninger	Texas
D	Paige Carmichael	Texas A&M
D	Brittany Dornseif	Colorado
D	Kasey Moore	Texas
MF	Nikki Keller	Colorado
MF	Alex Cousins	Colorado
MF	Amy Burlingham	Texas
F	Jesyca Rosholt	Oklahoma State
F	Ashlee Pistorius	Texas A&M
F	Nikki Marshall	Colorado
F	Kelsey Carpenter	Texas
