= 2005 Big 12 Conference women's soccer tournament =

Collegiate women's soccer tournament

- Classification: Division I
- Teams: 8
- Matches: 7
- Attendance: 6,768
- Site: Blossom Athletic Center; San Antonio, TX
- Champions: Texas A&M (4th title)
- Winning coach: Gerald G. Guerrieri (4th title)

2005 Big 12 Conference women's soccer standings
	Conf.						Overall
Team	W		L		T	PCT	W		L		T	PCT
No. 11 Texas A&M ‍†‍‡‍^{y}	7	–	2	–	1	.750	18	–	4	–	2	.792
No. 21 Colorado ‍‍‍^{y}	6	–	3	–	1	.650	13	–	8	–	3	.604
Iowa State ‍‍‍^{y}	6	–	3	–	1	.650	11	–	7	–	3	.595
No. 21 Nebraska ‍‍‍^{y}	6	–	3	–	1	.650	14	–	8	–	1	.630
Kansas ‍‍‍	6	–	3	–	1	.650	11	–	7	–	2	.600
Texas ‍‍‍^{y}	6	–	4	–	0	.600	11	–	9	–	1	.548
Oklahoma ‍‍‍	5	–	4	–	1	.550	13	–	6	–	1	.675
Missouri ‍‍‍	3	–	5	–	2	.400	9	–	8	–	3	.525
Oklahoma State ‍‍‍	3	–	6	–	1	.350	10	–	6	–	3	.605
Baylor ‍‍‍	2	–	7	–	1	.250	4	–	12	–	2	.278
Texas Tech ‍‍‍	0	–	10	–	0	.000	1	–	18	–	0	.053
† – Conference champion ‡ – Tournament champion y – Invited to the NCAA Tournament; Rankings from NSCAA Coaches

The 2005 Big 12 Conference women's soccer tournament was the postseason women's soccer tournament for the Big 12 Conference held from November 2 to 6, 2005. The 7-match tournament was held at the Blossom Athletic Center in San Antonio, TX with a combined attendance of 6,768. The 8-team single-elimination tournament consisted of three rounds based on seeding from regular season conference play. The Texas A&M Aggies defeated the Colorado Buffaloes in the championship match to win their 4th conference tournament.

== Regular season standings ==
Place	Seed	Team	Conference					Overall			
Place	Seed	Team	W	L	T	%	Pts	W	L	T	%
1	1	Texas A&M	7	2	1	.750	22	18	4	2	.792
2	2	Colorado	6	3	1	.650	19	13	8	3	.604
2	3	Iowa State	6	3	1	.650	19	11	7	3	.595
2	4	Nebraska	6	3	1	.650	19	14	8	1	.630
2	5	Kansas	6	3	1	.650	19	11	7	2	.600
6	6	Texas	6	4	0	.600	18	11	9	1	.548
7	7	Oklahoma	5	4	1	.550	16	13	6	1	.675
8	8	Missouri	3	5	2	.400	11	9	8	3	.525
9		Oklahoma State	3	6	1	.350	10	10	6	3	.605
10		Baylor	2	7	1	.250	7	4	12	2	.278
11		Texas Tech	0	10	0	.000	0	1	18	0	.053

== Bracket ==
Quarterfinals; Wednesday, Nov 2
1	Texas A&M	3
8	Missouri	1
4	Nebraska	3
5	Kansas	1
2	Colorado	2
7	Oklahoma	0
3	Iowa State	0
6	Texas	1

Semifinals; Friday, Nov 4
1	Texas A&M	4
4	Nebraska	2
2	Colorado	3^{OT}
6	Texas	2^{OT}

Final; Sunday, Nov 6
1	Texas A&M	2^{2OT}
2	Colorado	1^{2OT}

== Awards ==
=== Most valuable player ===
- Offensive MVP – Paige Carmichael – Texas A&M
- Defensive MVP – Ashlee Pistorius – Texas A&M

=== All-Tournament team ===
Position	Player	Team
GK	Dianna Pfenninger	Texas
GK	Kati Jo Spisak	Texas A&M
D	Darci Smerchek	Colorado
D	Kasey Moore	Texas
D	Linda Pierson	Texas A&M
D	Paige Carmichael	Texas A&M
MF	Kathryn Grandinetti	Colorado
MF	Jessie Bruch	Nebraska
MF	Kat Krambeer	Texas A&M
F	Katie Griffin	Colorado
F	Brittany Timko	Nebraska
F	Ashlee Pistorius	Texas A&M
