= 2004 Big 12 Conference women's soccer tournament =

Collegiate women's soccer tournament

- Classification: Division I
- Teams: 8
- Matches: 7
- Attendance: 7,606
- Site: Blossom Athletic Center; San Antonio, TX
- Champions: Texas A&M (3rd title)
- Winning coach: Gerald G. Guerrieri (3rd title)

2004 Big 12 Conference women's soccer standings
	Conf.						Overall
Team	W		L		T	PCT	W		L		T	PCT
No. 18 Kansas ‍†‍‍^{y}	8	–	2	–	0	.800	18	–	5	–	0	.783
No. 15 Texas A&M ‍†‍‡‍^{y}	8	–	2	–	0	.800	18	–	6	–	0	.750
Colorado ‍‍‍^{y}	6	–	3	–	1	.650	15	–	6	–	2	.696
No. 16 Texas ‍‍‍^{y}	6	–	3	–	1	.650	15	–	7	–	2	.667
No. 22 Nebraska ‍‍‍^{y}	6	–	4	–	0	.600	14	–	9	–	0	.609
Missouri ‍‍‍	5	–	5	–	0	.500	9	–	10	–	1	.475
Oklahoma State ‍‍‍	4	–	5	–	1	.450	12	–	6	–	2	.650
Iowa State ‍‍‍	4	–	6	–	0	.400	8	–	12	–	0	.400
Baylor ‍‍‍	3	–	6	–	1	.350	7	–	9	–	2	.444
Oklahoma ‍‍‍	3	–	7	–	0	.300	7	–	8	–	3	.472
Texas Tech ‍‍‍	0	–	10	–	0	.000	3	–	16	–	0	.158
† – Conference champion ‡ – Tournament champion y – Invited to the NCAA tournament Rankings from NSCAA Coaches

The 2004 Big 12 Conference women's soccer tournament was the postseason women's soccer tournament for the Big 12 Conference held from November 3 to 7, 2004. The 7-match tournament was held at the Blossom Athletic Center in San Antonio, TX with a combined attendance of 7,606. The 8-team single-elimination tournament consisted of three rounds based on seeding from regular season conference play. The Texas A&M Aggies defeated the Texas Longhorns in the championship match to win their 3rd conference tournament.

== Regular season standings ==
Place	Seed	Team	Conference					Overall			
Place	Seed	Team	W	L	T	%	Pts	W	L	T	%
1	1	Kansas	8	2	0	.800	24	18	5	0	.783
1	2	Texas A&M	8	2	0	.800	24	18	6	0	.750
3	3	Colorado	6	3	1	.650	19	15	6	2	.696
3	4	Texas	6	3	1	.650	19	15	7	2	.667
5	5	Nebraska	6	4	0	.600	18	14	9	0	.609
6	6	Missouri	5	5	0	.500	15	9	10	1	.475
7	7	Oklahoma State	4	5	1	.450	13	12	6	2	.650
8	8	Iowa State	4	6	0	.400	12	8	12	0	.400
9		Baylor	3	6	1	.350	10	7	9	2	.444
10		Oklahoma	3	7	0	.300	9	7	8	3	.472
11		Texas Tech	0	10	0	.000	0	3	16	0	.158

== Bracket ==
Quarterfinals; Wednesday, Nov 3
1	Kansas	4
8	Iowa State	1
4	Texas	2
5	Nebraska	0
2	Texas A&M	3
7	Oklahoma State	0
3	Colorado	2^{OT}
6	Missouri	1^{OT}

Semifinals; Friday, Nov 5
1	Kansas	2^{2OT}
4	Texas	3^{2OT}
2	Texas A&M	3
3	Colorado	1

Final; Sunday, Nov 7
4	Texas	0
2	Texas A&M	3

== Awards ==
=== Most valuable player ===
- Offensive MVP – Kelly Wilson – Texas
- Defensive MVP – Kati Jo Spisak – Texas A&M

=== All-Tournament team ===
Position	Player	Team
GK	Kati Jo Spisak	Texas A&M
D	Holly Gault	Kansas
D	Shannon Labhart	Texas A&M
D	Jordan Falcusan	Texas A&M
D	Kristen Teter	Texas
MF	Laura Probst	Texas A&M
MF	Amy Berend	Texas A&M
MF	Caitlin Kennedy	Texas
F	Caroline Smith	Kansas
F	Kelly Wilson	Texas
F	Ashlee Pistorius	Texas A&M
