= 2002 Big 12 Conference women's soccer tournament =

Collegiate women's soccer tournament

- Classification: Division I
- Teams: 8
- Matches: 7
- Attendance: 6,809
- Site: Blossom Athletic Center; San Antonio, TX
- Champions: Nebraska (5th title)
- Winning coach: John Walker (5th title)

2002 Big 12 Conference women's soccer standings
	Conf.						Overall
Team	W		L		T	PCT	W		L		T	PCT
No. 6 Texas A&M ‍†‍‍^{y}	9	–	0	–	1	.950	20	–	5	–	1	.788
No. 14 Texas ‍‍‍^{y}	9	–	1	–	0	.900	15	–	5	–	1	.738
No. 13 Nebraska ‍‍‡‍^{y}	6	–	3	–	1	.650	16	–	6	–	3	.700
Missouri ‍‍‍	5	–	4	–	1	.550	11	–	7	–	2	.600
Colorado ‍‍‍	4	–	4	–	2	.500	10	–	8	–	2	.550
Kansas ‍‍‍	4	–	5	–	1	.450	11	–	7	–	2	.600
Iowa State ‍‍‍	4	–	6	–	0	.400	7	–	11	–	1	.395
Oklahoma State ‍‍‍	4	–	6	–	0	.400	13	–	7	–	0	.650
Oklahoma ‍‍‍	4	–	6	–	0	.400	11	–	8	–	0	.579
Baylor ‍‍‍	2	–	6	–	2	.300	8	–	9	–	2	.474
Texas Tech ‍‍‍	0	–	10	–	0	.000	2	–	17	–	0	.105
† – Conference champion ‡ – Tournament champion y – Invited to the NCAA tournament Rankings from NSCAA Coaches

The 2002 Big 12 Conference women's soccer tournament was the postseason women's soccer tournament for the Big 12 Conference held from November 7 to 10, 2002. The 7-match tournament was held at the Blossom Athletic Center in San Antonio, TX with a combined attendance of 6,809. The 8-team single-elimination tournament consisted of three rounds based on seeding from regular season conference play. The Nebraska Cornhuskers defeated the Texas A&M Aggies in the championship match to win their 5th conference tournament.

== Regular season standings ==
Place	Seed	Team	Conference					Overall			
Place	Seed	Team	W	L	T	%	Pts	W	L	T	%
1	1	Texas A&M	9	0	1	.950	28	20	5	1	.788
2	2	Texas	9	1	0	.900	27	15	5	1	.738
3	3	Nebraska	6	3	1	.650	19	16	6	3	.700
4	4	Missouri	5	4	1	.550	16	11	7	2	.600
5	5	Colorado	4	4	2	.500	14	10	8	2	.550
6	6	Kansas	4	5	1	.450	13	11	7	2	.600
7	7	Iowa State	4	6	0	.400	12	7	11	1	.395
7	8	Oklahoma State	4	6	0	.400	12	13	7	0	.650
7		Oklahoma	4	6	0	.400	12	11	8	0	.579
9		Baylor	2	6	2	.300	8	8	9	2	.474
11		Texas Tech	0	10	0	.000	0	2	17	0	.105

== Bracket ==
Quarterfinals; Thursday, Nov 7
1	Texas A&M	5
8	Oklahoma State	0
4	Missouri	0
5	Colorado	1
2	Texas	4
7	Iowa State	1
3	Nebraska	2
6	Kansas	1

Semifinals; Friday, Nov 8
1	Texas A&M	3
5	Colorado	1
2	Texas	1^{OT}
3	Nebraska	2^{OT}

Final; Sunday, Nov 10
1	Texas A&M	0
3	Nebraska	1

== Awards ==
=== Most valuable player ===
- Offensive MVP – Christine Latham – Nebraska
- Defensive MVP – Christy Harms – Nebraska

=== All-Tournament team ===
Position	Player	Team
GK	Erin Miller	Nebraska
D	Christy Harms	Nebraska
D	Jessica Martin	Texas A&M
D	Jenna Cooper	Nebraska
D	Katie Bunkers	Nebraska
MF	Kristen Strutz	Texas A&M
MF	Carrie Berend	Texas A&M
MF	Lauren Field	Texas
F	Kelly McDonald	Texas
F	Heather Ragsdale	Texas A&M
F	Christine Latham	Nebraska
