= 2000 Big 12 Conference women's soccer tournament =

Collegiate women's soccer tournament

- Classification: Division I
- Teams: 8
- Matches: 7
- Attendance: 3,999
- Site: Blossom Athletic Center; San Antonio, TX
- Champions: Nebraska (4th title)
- Winning coach: John Walker (4th title)

2000 Big 12 Conference women's soccer standings
	Conf.						Overall
Team	W		L		T	PCT	W		L		T	PCT
No. 9 Nebraska ‍†‍‡‍^{y}	9	–	1	–	0	.900	22	–	2	–	0	.917
No. 12 Texas A&M ‍‍‍^{y}	8	–	2	–	0	.800	18	–	7	–	0	.720
Texas ‍‍‍	7	–	3	–	0	.700	12	–	7	–	0	.632
Baylor ‍‍‍	6	–	2	–	2	.700	10	–	6	–	3	.605
Missouri ‍‍‍	5	–	5	–	0	.500	10	–	10	–	0	.500
Oklahoma ‍‍‍	4	–	5	–	1	.450	10	–	9	–	1	.525
Colorado ‍‍‍	4	–	6	–	0	.400	8	–	11	–	0	.421
Kansas ‍‍‍	3	–	6	–	1	.350	7	–	10	–	2	.421
Iowa State ‍‍‍	3	–	6	–	1	.350	7	–	10	–	2	.421
Texas Tech ‍‍‍	2	–	8	–	0	.200	4	–	14	–	0	.222
Oklahoma State ‍‍‍	1	–	8	–	1	.150	4	–	14	–	1	.237
† – Conference champion ‡ – Tournament champion y – Invited to the NCAA Tournament; Rankings from NSCAA Coaches

The 2000 Big 12 Conference women's soccer tournament was the postseason women's soccer tournament for the Big 12 Conference held from November 1 to 4, 2000. The 7-match tournament was held at the Blossom Athletic Center in San Antonio, TX with a combined attendance of 3,999. The 8-team single-elimination tournament consisted of three rounds based on seeding from regular season conference play. The Nebraska Cornhuskers defeated the Texas A&M Aggies in the championship match to win their 4th conference tournament.

== Regular season standings ==
Place	Seed	Team	Conference					Overall			
Place	Seed	Team	W	L	T	%	Pts	W	L	T	%
1	1	Nebraska	9	1	0	.900	27	22	2	0	.917
2	2	Texas A&M	8	2	0	.800	24	18	7	0	.720
3	3	Texas	7	3	0	.700	21	12	7	0	.632
4	4	Baylor	6	2	2	.700	20	10	6	3	.605
5	5	Missouri	5	5	0	.500	15	10	10	0	.500
6	6	Oklahoma	4	5	1	.450	13	10	9	1	.525
7	7	Colorado	4	6	0	.400	12	8	11	0	.421
8	8	Kansas	3	6	1	.350	10	7	10	2	.421
8		Iowa State	3	6	1	.350	10	7	10	2	.421
10		Texas Tech	2	8	0	.200	6	4	14	0	.222
11		Oklahoma State	1	8	1	.150	4	4	14	1	.237

== Bracket ==
Quarterfinals; Wednesday, Nov 1
1	Nebraska	4
8	Kansas	0
4	Baylor	4^{OT}
5	Missouri	3^{OT}
2	Texas A&M	3
7	Colorado	1
3	Texas	0
6	Oklahoma	2

Semifinals; Thursday, Nov 2
1	Nebraska	4
4	Baylor	0
2	Texas A&M	1
6	Oklahoma	0

Final; Saturday, Nov 4
1	Nebraska	4
2	Texas A&M	1

== Awards ==
=== Most valuable player ===
- Offensive MVP – Christine Latham – Nebraska
- Defensive MVP – Amber Reynolds – Texas A&M

=== All-Tournament team ===
Position	Player	Team
GK	Dawn Greathouse	Baylor
D	Bridgett Smith	Oklahoma
D	Amber Reynolds	Texas A&M
D	Jenny Benson	Nebraska
MF	Meghan Anderson	Nebraska
MF	Heather Wiebe	Texas A&M
MF	Andrea Starns	Texas A&M
F	Christine Latham	Nebraska
F	Nikki Thole	Missouri
F	Christy Harms	Nebraska
F	Kristen Strutz	Texas A&M
