= 2008 Big 12 Conference women's soccer tournament =

Collegiate women's soccer tournament

- Classification: Division I
- Teams: 8
- Matches: 7
- Attendance: 5,216
- Site: Blossom Athletic Center; San Antonio, Texas
- Champions: Missouri (1st title)
- Winning coach: Bryan Blitz (1st title)

2008 Big 12 Conference women's soccer standings
	Conf.						Overall
Team	W		L		T	PCT	W		L		T	PCT
No. 13 Oklahoma State ‍†‍‍^{y}	7	–	1	–	2	.800	18	–	1	–	4	.870
No. 7 Texas A&M ‍‍‍^{y}	7	–	2	–	1	.750	18	–	5	–	1	.771
No. 17 Missouri ‍‍‡‍^{y}	7	–	3	–	0	.700	16	–	5	–	2	.739
No. 22 Colorado ‍‍‍^{y}	6	–	2	–	2	.700	14	–	5	–	4	.696
Nebraska ‍‍‍	6	–	4	–	0	.600	10	–	9	–	1	.525
No. 18 Texas ‍‍‍^{y}	5	–	2	–	3	.650	13	–	4	–	4	.714
Kansas ‍‍‍^{y}	4	–	5	–	1	.450	13	–	8	–	2	.609
Texas Tech ‍‍‍	3	–	7	–	0	.300	8	–	10	–	1	.447
Oklahoma ‍‍‍	2	–	7	–	1	.250	3	–	15	–	1	.184
Baylor ‍‍‍	1	–	7	–	2	.200	5	–	11	–	3	.342
Iowa State ‍‍‍	0	–	8	–	2	.100	5	–	12	–	2	.316
† – Conference champion ‡ – Tournament champion y – Invited to the NCAA tournament Rankings from NSCAA Coaches

The 2008 Big 12 Conference women's soccer tournament was the postseason women's soccer tournament for the Big 12 Conference held from November 5 to 9, 2008. The 7-match tournament was held at the Blossom Athletic Center in San Antonio, Texas, United States, with a combined attendance of 5,216. The 8-team single-elimination tournament consisted of three rounds based on seeding from regular season conference play. The Missouri Tigers defeated the Colorado Buffaloes in the championship match to win their 1st conference tournament.

== Regular season standings ==
Place	Seed	Team	Conference					Overall			
Place	Seed	Team	W	L	T	%	Pts	W	L	T	%
1	1	Oklahoma State	7	1	2	.800	23	18	1	4	.870
2	2	Texas A&M	7	2	1	.750	22	18	5	1	.771
3	3	Missouri	7	3	0	.700	21	16	5	2	.739
4	4	Colorado	6	2	2	.700	20	14	5	4	.696
5	5	Nebraska	6	4	0	.600	18	10	9	1	.525
5	6	Texas	5	2	3	.650	18	13	4	4	.714
7	7	Kansas	4	5	1	.450	13	13	8	2	.609
8	8	Texas Tech	3	7	0	.300	9	8	10	1	.447
9		Oklahoma	2	7	1	.250	7	3	15	1	.184
10		Baylor	1	7	2	.200	5	5	11	3	.342
11		Iowa State	0	8	2	.100	2	5	12	2	.316

== Bracket ==
Quarterfinals; Wednesday, Nov 5
1	Oklahoma State	3
8	Texas Tech	0
4	Colorado	1
5	Nebraska	0
2	Texas A&M	2
7	Kansas	4
3	Missouri	3
6	Texas	1

Semifinals; Friday, Nov 7
1	Oklahoma State	1 (2)
4	Colorado	1 (3)
7	Kansas	1 (3)
3	Missouri	1 (4)

Final; Sunday, Nov 9
4	Colorado	0
3	Missouri	1

== Awards ==
=== Most valuable player ===
- Offensive MVP – Alysha Bonnick – Missouri
- Defensive MVP – Tasha Dittamore – Missouri

=== All-Tournament team ===
Position	Player	Team
GK	Kristin Radlinksi	Colorado
GK	Tasha Dittamore	Missouri
D	Kat Tarr	Missouri
D	Estelle Johnson	Kansas
D	Michelle Wenino	Colorado
MF	Monica Dolinsky	Kansas
MF	Yolanda Odenyo	Oklahoma State
MF	Meghan Pfeiffer	Missouri
MF	Mo Redmond	Missouri
F	Shannon McCabe	Kansas
F	Kasey Langdon	Oklahoma State
F	Alysha Bonnick	Missouri
