= 1998 Big 12 Conference women's soccer tournament =

Collegiate women's soccer tournament

- Classification: Division I
- Teams: 6
- Matches: 5
- Attendance: 3,904
- Site: Blossom Athletic Center; San Antonio, TX
- Champions: Nebraska (2nd title)
- Winning coach: John Walker (2nd title)

1998 Big 12 Conference women's soccer standings
	Conf.						Overall
Team	W		L		T	PCT	W		L		T	PCT
No. 18 Baylor ‍†‍‍^{y}	9	–	0	–	1	.950	15	–	5	–	1	.738
No. 10 Nebraska ‍‍‡‍^{y}	9	–	1	–	0	.900	17	–	4	–	1	.795
Texas A&M ‍‍‍^{y}	7	–	2	–	0	.778	14	–	8	–	0	.636
Texas ‍‍‍	4	–	3	–	3	.550	6	–	9	–	3	.417
Missouri ‍‍‍	5	–	5	–	0	.500	11	–	9	–	1	.548
Iowa State ‍‍‍	5	–	5	–	0	.500	10	–	8	–	1	.553
Texas Tech ‍‍‍	3	–	5	–	2	.400	7	–	7	–	3	.500
Colorado ‍‍‍	2	–	6	–	2	.300	5	–	12	–	3	.325
Oklahoma State ‍‍‍	1	–	6	–	3	.250	7	–	8	–	3	.472
Oklahoma ‍‍‍	2	–	7	–	0	.222	8	–	9	–	0	.471
Kansas ‍‍‍	1	–	8	–	1	.150	5	–	13	–	1	.289
† – Conference champion ‡ – Tournament champion y – Invited to the NCAA tournament Rankings from NSCAA Coaches

The 1998 Big 12 Conference women's soccer tournament was the postseason women's soccer tournament for the Big 12 Conference held from November 5 to 7, 1998. The 5-match tournament was held at the Blossom Athletic Center in San Antonio, TX with a combined attendance of 3,904. The 6-team single-elimination tournament consisted of three rounds based on seeding from regular season conference play. The Nebraska Cornhuskers defeated the Missouri Tigers in the championship match to win their 2nd conference tournament.

== Regular Season Standings ==
Place	Seed	Team	Conference					Overall			
Place	Seed	Team	W	L	T	%	Pts	W	L	T	%
1	1	Baylor	9	0	1	.950	28	15	5	1	.738
2	2	Nebraska	9	1	0	.900	27	17	4	1	.795
3	3	Texas A&M	7	2	0	.778	21	14	8	0	.636
4	4	Texas	4	3	3	.550	15	6	9	3	.417
4	5	Missouri	5	5	0	.500	15	11	9	1	.548
4	6	Iowa State	5	5	0	.500	15	10	8	1	.553
7		Texas Tech	3	5	2	.400	11	7	7	3	.500
8		Colorado	2	6	2	.300	8	5	12	3	.325
9		Oklahoma State	1	6	3	.250	6	7	8	3	.472
9		Oklahoma	2	7	0	.222	6	8	9	0	.471
11		Kansas	1	8	1	.150	4	5	13	1	.289

== Bracket ==
Quarterfinals; Thursday, Nov 5
4	Texas	1
5	Missouri	3
3	Texas A&M	6
6	Iowa State	0

Semifinals; Friday, Nov 6
1	Baylor	2
5	Missouri	3
2	Nebraska	3^{3OT}
3	Texas A&M	2^{3OT}

Final; Saturday, Nov 7
5	Missouri	0
2	Nebraska	4

== Awards ==
=== Most valuable player ===
- Offensive MVP – Nicky Thrasher – Texas A&M
- Defensive MVP – Isabelle Morneau – Nebraska

=== All-Tournament team ===
Position	Player	Team
GK	Jackie Adamec	Missouri
D	Emily Elias	Texas A&M
D	Sharolta Nonen	Nebraska
D	Isabelle Morneau	Nebraska
MF	Erica Florez	Iowa State
MF	Amy Timmerman	Missouri
MF	Becky Hogan	Nebraska
F	Nicky Thrasher	Texas A&M
F	Nikki Thole	Missouri
F	Erin Grimsley	Missouri
F	Lindsay Eddleman	Nebraska
