= 2011 Big 12 Conference women's soccer tournament =

Collegiate women's soccer tournament

- Classification: Division I
- Teams: 8
- Matches: 7
- Attendance: 4,903
- Site: Blossom Athletic Center; San Antonio, TX
- Champions: Texas A&M (5th title)
- Winning coach: Gerald G. Guerrieri (5th title)

2011 Big 12 Conference women's soccer standings
	Conf.						Overall
Team	W		L		T	PCT	W		L		T	PCT
No. 5 Oklahoma State ‍†‍‍^{y}	6	–	0	–	2	.875	17	–	0	–	2	.947
No. 21 Texas A&M ‍‍‡‍^{y}	6	–	1	–	1	.813	13	–	5	–	1	.711
Baylor ‍‍‍^{y}	5	–	2	–	1	.688	14	–	3	–	2	.789
Texas Tech ‍‍‍	3	–	4	–	1	.438	10	–	7	–	2	.579
Texas ‍‍‍^{y}	3	–	4	–	1	.438	10	–	7	–	1	.583
Missouri ‍‍‍	3	–	5	–	0	.375	12	–	7	–	0	.632
Kansas ‍‍‍^{y}	3	–	5	–	0	.375	11	–	8	–	0	.579
Oklahoma ‍‍‍	2	–	6	–	0	.250	7	–	12	–	0	.368
Iowa State ‍‍‍	2	–	6	–	0	.250	9	–	9	–	1	.500
† – Conference champion ‡ – Tournament champion y – Invited to the NCAA tournament Rankings from NSCAA Coaches

The 2011 Big 12 Conference women's soccer tournament was the postseason women's soccer tournament for the Big 12 Conference held from November 2 to 6, 2011. The 7-match tournament was held at the Blossom Athletic Center in San Antonio, TX with a combined attendance of 4,903. The 8-team single-elimination tournament consisted of three rounds based on seeding from regular season conference play. The Texas A&M Aggies defeated the Oklahoma State Cowgirls in the championship match to win their 5th conference tournament.

== Regular season standings ==
Place	Seed	Team	Conference					Overall			
Place	Seed	Team	W	L	T	%	Pts	W	L	T	%
1	1	Oklahoma State	6	0	2	.875	20	17	0	2	.947
2	2	Texas A&M	6	1	1	.813	19	13	5	1	.711
3	3	Baylor	5	2	1	.688	16	14	3	2	.789
4	4	Texas Tech	3	4	1	.438	10	10	7	2	.579
4	5	Texas	3	4	1	.438	10	10	7	1	.583
6	6	Missouri	3	5	0	.375	9	12	7	0	.632
6	7	Kansas	3	5	0	.375	9	11	8	0	.579
8	8	Oklahoma	2	6	0	.250	6	7	12	0	.368
8		Iowa State	2	6	0	.250	6	9	9	1	.500

== Bracket ==
Quarterfinals; Wednesday, Nov 2
1	Oklahoma State	1
8	Oklahoma	0
4	Texas Tech	0
5	Texas	1
2	Texas A&M	3 (5)
7	Kansas	3 (3)
3	Baylor	0 (3)
6	Missouri	0 (4)

Semifinals; Friday, Nov 4
1	Oklahoma State	1^{2OT}
5	Texas	0^{2OT}
2	Texas A&M	3
6	Missouri	0

Final; Sunday, Nov 6
1	Oklahoma State	0
2	Texas A&M	1

== Awards ==
=== Most valuable player ===
- Offensive MVP – Kelley Monogue – Texas A&M
- Defensive MVP – Adrianna Franch – Oklahoma State

=== All-Tournament team ===
Position	Player	Team
GK	Adrianna Franch	Oklahoma State
D	Melinda Mercado	Oklahoma State
D	Carson Michalowski	Oklahoma State
D	Meghan Streight	Texas A&M
MF	Kyndall Treadwell	Oklahoma State
MF	Merritt Mathias	Texas A&M
MF	Kristin Cummins	Texas
F	Kelly Monogue	Texas A&M
F	Krista Lopez	Oklahoma State
F	Annie Kunz	Texas A&M
F	Megan Marchesano	Oklahoma State
