= 1999 Big 12 Conference women's soccer tournament =

Collegiate women's soccer tournament

- Classification: Division I
- Teams: 8
- Matches: 7
- Attendance: 6,101
- Site: Blossom Athletic Center; San Antonio, TX
- Champions: Nebraska (3rd title)
- Winning coach: John Walker (3rd title)

1999 Big 12 Conference women's soccer standings
	Conf.						Overall
Team	W		L		T	PCT	W		L		T	PCT
No. 5 Nebraska ‍†‍‡‍^{y}	10	–	0	–	0	1.000	22	–	1	–	2	.920
No. 11 Texas A&M ‍‍‍^{y}	7	–	3	–	0	.700	17	–	5	–	1	.761
Missouri ‍‍‍^{y}	6	–	3	–	1	.650	14	–	8	–	1	.630
Baylor ‍‍‍^{y}	6	–	3	–	1	.650	14	–	7	–	1	.659
Texas ‍‍‍	4	–	4	–	2	.500	8	–	9	–	2	.474
Colorado ‍‍‍	4	–	5	–	1	.450	11	–	8	–	1	.575
Iowa State ‍‍‍	4	–	6	–	0	.400	11	–	8	–	1	.575
Texas Tech ‍‍‍	4	–	6	–	0	.400	8	–	11	–	1	.425
Kansas ‍‍‍	3	–	6	–	1	.350	8	–	10	–	1	.447
Oklahoma State ‍‍‍	2	–	8	–	0	.200	5	–	14	–	0	.263
Oklahoma ‍‍‍	2	–	8	–	0	.200	4	–	13	–	1	.250
† – Conference champion ‡ – Tournament champion y – Invited to the NCAA tournament Rankings from NSCAA Coaches

The 1999 Big 12 Conference women's soccer tournament was the postseason women's soccer tournament for the Big 12 Conference held from November 3 to 6, 1999. The 7-match tournament was held at the Blossom Athletic Center in San Antonio, TX with a combined attendance of 6,101. The 8-team single-elimination tournament consisted of three rounds based on seeding from regular season conference play. The Nebraska Cornhuskers defeated the Missouri Tigers in the championship match to win their 3rd conference tournament.

== Regular season standings ==
Place	Seed	Team	Conference					Overall			
Place	Seed	Team	W	L	T	%	Pts	W	L	T	%
1	1	Nebraska	10	0	0	1.000	30	22	1	2	.920
2	2	Texas A&M	7	3	0	.700	21	17	5	1	.761
3	3	Missouri	6	3	1	.650	19	14	8	1	.630
3	4	Baylor	6	3	1	.650	19	14	7	1	.659
5	5	Texas	4	4	2	.500	14	8	9	2	.474
6	6	Colorado	4	5	1	.450	13	11	8	1	.575
7	7	Iowa State	4	6	0	.400	12	11	8	1	.575
7	8	Texas Tech	4	6	0	.400	12	8	11	1	.425
9		Kansas	3	6	1	.350	10	8	10	1	.447
10		Oklahoma State	2	8	0	.200	6	5	14	0	.263
10		Oklahoma	2	8	0	.200	6	4	13	1	.250

== Bracket ==
Quarterfinals; Wednesday, Nov 3
1	Nebraska	10
8	Texas Tech	1
4	Baylor	2
5	Texas	0
2	Texas A&M	0 (4)
7	Iowa State	0 (5)
3	Missouri	5
6	Colorado	3

Semifinals; Thursday, Nov 4
1	Nebraska	7
4	Baylor	1
7	Iowa State	1
3	Missouri	2

Final; Saturday, Nov 6
1	Nebraska	2
3	Missouri	1

== Awards ==
=== Most valuable player ===
- Offensive MVP – Erica Florez – Iowa State
- Defensive MVP – Sharolta Nonen – Nebraska

=== All-Tournament team ===
Position	Player	Team
GK	Lynley Hilligoss	Iowa State
D	Christine Gluck	Nebraska
D	Isabelle Morneau	Nebraska
D	Sharolta Nonen	Nebraska
MF	Nikki Hales	Baylor
MF	Katie Antongiovanni	Iowa State
MF	Jenny Benson	Nebraska
MF	Meghan Anderson	Nebraska
F	Courtney Saunders	Baylor
F	Erica Florez	Iowa State
F	Nikki Thole	Missouri
