= 1997 Big 12 Conference women's soccer tournament =

Collegiate women's soccer tournament

- Classification: Division I
- Teams: 6
- Matches: 5
- Attendance: 6,469
- Site: Blossom Athletic Center; San Antonio, TX
- Champions: Texas A&M (1st title)
- Winning coach: G Guerrieri (1st title)

1997 Big 12 Conference women's soccer standings
	Conf.						Overall
Team	W		L		T	PCT	W		L		T	PCT
No. 12 Texas A&M ‍†‍‡‍^{y}	9	–	1	–	0	.900	18	–	3	–	0	.857
No. 7 Nebraska ‍‍‍^{y}	8	–	2	–	0	.800	18	–	4	–	0	.818
Baylor ‍‍‍	7	–	3	–	0	.700	14	–	6	–	1	.690
Texas ‍‍‍	7	–	3	–	0	.700	10	–	10	–	0	.500
Colorado ‍‍‍	5	–	5	–	0	.500	6	–	12	–	0	.333
Iowa State ‍‍‍	4	–	6	–	0	.400	12	–	9	–	0	.571
Texas Tech ‍‍‍	4	–	6	–	0	.400	7	–	11	–	0	.389
Missouri ‍‍‍	4	–	6	–	0	.400	7	–	12	–	0	.368
Oklahoma State ‍‍‍	4	–	6	–	0	.400	9	–	9	–	1	.500
Kansas ‍‍‍	2	–	8	–	0	.200	7	–	12	–	1	.375
Oklahoma ‍‍‍	1	–	9	–	0	.100	2	–	14	–	0	.125
† – Conference champion ‡ – Tournament champion y – Invited to the NCAA Tournament; Rankings from NSCAA Coaches

The 1997 Big 12 Conference women's soccer tournament was the postseason women's soccer tournament for the Big 12 Conference held from November 6 to 9, 1997. The 5-match tournament was held at the Blossom Athletic Center in San Antonio, TX with a combined attendance of 6,469. The 6-team single-elimination tournament consisted of three rounds based on seeding from regular season conference play. The Texas A&M Aggies defeated the Nebraska Cornhuskers in the championship match to win their 1st conference tournament.

== Regular season standings ==
Place	Seed	Team	Conference					Overall			
Place	Seed	Team	W	L	T	%	Pts	W	L	T	%
1	1	Texas A&M	9	1	0	.900	27	18	3	0	.857
2	2	Nebraska	8	2	0	.800	24	18	4	0	.818
3	3	Baylor	7	3	0	.700	21	14	6	1	.690
3	4	Texas	7	3	0	.700	21	10	10	0	.500
5	5	Colorado	5	5	0	.500	15	6	12	0	.333
6	6	Iowa State	4	6	0	.400	12	12	9	0	.571
6		Texas Tech	4	6	0	.400	12	7	11	0	.389
6		Missouri	4	6	0	.400	12	7	12	0	.368
6		Oklahoma State	4	6	0	.400	12	9	9	1	.500
10		Kansas	2	8	0	.200	6	7	12	1	.375
11		Oklahoma	1	9	0	.100	3	2	14	0	.125

== Bracket ==
Quarterfinals; Thursday, Nov 6
4	Texas	1
5	Colorado	0
3	Baylor	4
6	Iowa State	2

Semifinals; Friday, Nov 7
1	Texas A&M	3
4	Texas	1
2	Nebraska	4
3	Baylor	1

Final; Sunday, Nov 9
1	Texas A&M	3
2	Nebraska	1

== Awards ==
=== most valuable player ===
- Offensive MVP – Sharon Pickering – Texas A&M
- Defensive MVP – Claire Elliott – Texas A&M

=== All-Tournament team ===
Position	Player	Team
GK	Melanie Wilson	Texas A&M
D	Emily Elias	Texas A&M
D	Claire Elliott	Texas A&M
D	Sharolta Nonen	Nebraska
D	Nicole Ramirez	Texas
MF	Jenny Benson	Nebraska
MF	Bryn Blalack	Texas A&M
MF	Kari Uppinghouse	Nebraska
F	Kim Engesser	Nebraska
F	Sharon Pickering	Texas A&M
F	Courtney Saunders	Baylor
