= 2009 Big 12 Conference women's soccer tournament =

Collegiate women's soccer tournament

- Classification: Division I
- Teams: 9
- Matches: 8
- Attendance: 6,750
- Site: Blossom Athletic Center; San Antonio, TX
- Champions: Oklahoma State (2nd title)
- Winning coach: Colin Carmichael (1st title)

2009 Big 12 Conference women's soccer standings
	Conf.						Overall
Team	W		L		T	PCT	W		L		T	PCT
Missouri ‍†‍‍	7	–	1	–	2	.800	13	–	6	–	3	.659
No. 13 Texas A&M ‍‍‍^{y}	6	–	2	–	2	.700	15	–	7	–	3	.660
Colorado ‍‍‍	6	–	4	–	0	.600	9	–	10	–	0	.474
Nebraska ‍‍‍	5	–	3	–	2	.600	11	–	5	–	4	.650
Oklahoma State ‍‍‡‍^{y}	5	–	5	–	0	.500	15	–	7	–	2	.667
Texas ‍‍‍	4	–	3	–	3	.550	9	–	9	–	3	.500
Baylor ‍‍‍	3	–	4	–	3	.450	8	–	6	–	5	.553
Kansas ‍‍‍	4	–	6	–	0	.400	12	–	8	–	2	.591
Texas Tech ‍‍‍	3	–	4	–	3	.450	8	–	8	–	4	.500
Oklahoma ‍‍‍	2	–	7	–	1	.250	7	–	10	–	2	.421
Iowa State ‍‍‍	2	–	8	–	0	.200	7	–	9	–	4	.450
† – Conference champion ‡ – Tournament champion y – Invited to the NCAA tournament Rankings from NSCAA Coaches

The 2009 Big 12 Conference women's soccer tournament was the postseason women's soccer tournament for the Big 12 Conference held from November 4 to 8, 2009. The 8-match tournament was held at the Blossom Athletic Center in San Antonio, TX with a combined attendance of 6,750. The 9-team single-elimination tournament consisted of four rounds based on seeding from regular season conference play. The Oklahoma State Cowgirls defeated the Texas A&M Aggies in the championship match to win their 2nd conference tournament.

== Regular season standings ==
Place	Seed	Team	Conference					Overall			
Place	Seed	Team	W	L	T	%	Pts	W	L	T	%
1	1	Missouri	7	1	2	.800	23	13	6	3	.659
2	2	Texas A&M	6	2	2	.700	20	15	7	3	.660
3	3	Colorado	6	4	0	.600	18	9	10	0	.474
4	4	Nebraska	5	3	2	.600	17	11	5	4	.650
5	5	Oklahoma State	5	5	0	.500	15	15	7	2	.667
5	6	Texas	4	3	3	.550	15	9	9	3	.500
7	7	Baylor	3	4	3	.450	12	8	6	5	.553
7	8	Kansas	4	6	0	.400	12	12	8	2	.591
7	8	Texas Tech	3	4	3	.450	12	8	8	4	.500
10		Oklahoma	2	7	1	.250	7	7	10	2	.421
11		Iowa State	2	8	0	.200	6	7	9	4	.450

== Bracket ==
Play-in game Monday, Nov 2
8	Kansas (p)	1 (5)
8	Texas Tech	1 (4)

Quarterfinals; Wednesday, Nov 4
1	Missouri (a.s.d.e.t.)	3
8	Kansas	2
4	Nebraska	0
5	Oklahoma State	3
2	Texas A&M	2
7	Baylor	0
3	Colorado	0
6	Texas (a.s.d.e.t.)	1

Semifinals; Friday, Nov 6
1	Missouri	2
5	Oklahoma State	3
2	Texas A&M	5
6	Texas	1

Final; Sunday, Nov 8
5	Oklahoma State	1
2	Texas A&M	0

== Awards ==
=== Most valuable player ===
- Offensive MVP – Rachel Shipley – Texas A&M
- Defensive MVP – Melinda Mercado – Oklahoma State

=== All-Tournament team ===
Position	Player	Team
GK	Adrianna Franch	Oklahoma State
D	Emily Peterson	Texas A&M
D	Melinda Mercado	Oklahoma State
D	Mary Grace Schmidt	Texas A&M
MF	Annika Niemeier	Oklahoma State
MF	Rachel Shipley	Texas A&M
MF	Sophie Campise	Texas
F	Kristin Andrighetto	Missouri
F	Kasey Langdon	Oklahoma State
F	Whitney Hooper	Texas A&M
F	Siera Strawser	Oklahoma State
