= 2003 Big 12 Conference women's soccer tournament =

Collegiate women's soccer tournament

- Classification: Division I
- Teams: 8
- Matches: 7
- Attendance: 4,293
- Site: Blossom Athletic Center; San Antonio, TX
- Champions: Oklahoma State (1st title)
- Winning coach: Karen Hancock (1st title)

2003 Big 12 Conference women's soccer standings
	Conf.						Overall
Team	W		L		T	PCT	W		L		T	PCT
No. 21 Colorado ‍†‍‍^{y}	8	–	1	–	1	.850	15	–	4	–	1	.775
Texas ‍‍‍^{y}	7	–	3	–	0	.700	12	–	9	–	0	.571
No. 13 Kansas ‍‍‍^{y}	6	–	3	–	1	.650	18	–	6	–	1	.740
No. 23 Nebraska ‍‍‍^{y}	6	–	4	–	0	.600	13	–	8	–	1	.614
No. 11 Texas A&M ‍‍‍^{y}	5	–	3	–	2	.600	13	–	6	–	3	.659
Oklahoma ‍‍‍^{y}	3	–	3	–	4	.500	8	–	7	–	5	.525
Oklahoma State ‍‍‡‍^{y}	3	–	4	–	3	.450	15	–	5	–	3	.717
Missouri ‍‍‍^{y}	3	–	6	–	1	.350	12	–	11	–	1	.521
Baylor ‍‍‍	2	–	6	–	2	.300	7	–	9	–	2	.444
Iowa State ‍‍‍	2	–	6	–	2	.300	5	–	10	–	4	.368
Texas Tech ‍‍‍	2	–	8	–	0	.200	3	–	13	–	1	.206
† – Conference champion ‡ – Tournament champion y – Invited to the NCAA tournament Rankings from NSCAA Coaches

The 2003 Big 12 Conference women's soccer tournament was the postseason women's soccer tournament for the Big 12 Conference held from November 6 to 9, 2003. The 7-match tournament was held at the Blossom Athletic Center in San Antonio, TX with a combined attendance of 4,293. The 8-team single-elimination tournament consisted of three rounds based on seeding from regular season conference play. The Oklahoma State Cowgirls defeated the Missouri Tigers in the championship match to win their 1st conference tournament.

== Regular season standings ==
Place	Seed	Team	Conference					Overall			
Place	Seed	Team	W	L	T	%	Pts	W	L	T	%
1	1	Colorado	8	1	1	.850	25	15	4	1	.775
2	2	Texas	7	3	0	.700	21	12	9	0	.571
3	3	Kansas	6	3	1	.650	19	18	6	1	.740
4	4	Nebraska	6	4	0	.600	18	13	8	1	.614
5	5	Texas A&M	5	3	2	.600	17	13	6	3	.659
6	6	Oklahoma	3	3	4	.500	13	8	7	5	.525
7	7	Oklahoma State	3	4	3	.450	12	15	5	3	.717
8	8	Missouri	3	6	1	.350	10	12	11	1	.521
9		Baylor	2	6	2	.300	8	7	9	2	.444
9		Iowa State	2	6	2	.300	8	5	10	4	.368
11		Texas Tech	2	8	0	.200	6	3	13	1	.206

== Bracket ==
Quarterfinals; Thursday, Nov 6
1	Colorado	0
8	Missouri	2
4	Nebraska	2^{OT}
5	Texas A&M	1^{OT}
2	Texas	0
7	Oklahoma State	1
3	Kansas	1
6	Oklahoma	0

Semifinals; Friday, Nov 7
8	Missouri	3
4	Nebraska	2
7	Oklahoma State	1
3	Kansas	0

Final; Sunday, Nov 9
8	Missouri	2^{2OT}
7	Oklahoma State	3^{2OT}

== Awards ==
=== Most valuable player ===
- Offensive MVP – Cassie Lewis – Oklahoma State
- Defensive MVP – Kathrin Lehmann – Oklahoma State

=== All-Tournament team ===
Position	Player	Team
GK	Kathrin Lehmann	Oklahoma State
D	Erica Pusch	Missouri
D	Jenna Cooper	Nebraska
D	Karen Bauer	Missouri
MF	Brittany Timko	Nebraska
MF	Cassie Lewis	Oklahoma State
MF	Elyse Nikonchuck	Missouri
F	Melissa Peabody	Missouri
F	Jere Boykin	Oklahoma State
F	Caroline Smith	Kansas
F	Kristen Heil	Missouri
