= 2001 Big 12 Conference women's soccer tournament =

Collegiate women's soccer tournament

- Classification: Division I
- Teams: 8
- Matches: 7
- Attendance: 7,482
- Site: Blossom Athletic Center; San Antonio, TX
- Champions: Texas A&M (2nd title)
- Winning coach: Gerald G. Guerrieri (2nd title)

2001 Big 12 Conference women's soccer standings
	Conf.						Overall
Team	W		L		T	PCT	W		L		T	PCT
Texas ‍†‍‍^{y}	9	–	1	–	0	.900	14	–	6	–	0	.700
No. 12 Nebraska ‍‍‍^{y}	8	–	1	–	1	.850	17	–	5	–	1	.761
No. 7 Texas A&M ‍‍‡‍^{y}	8	–	1	–	1	.850	17	–	4	–	1	.795
Kansas ‍‍‍^{y}	7	–	3	–	0	.700	13	–	8	–	0	.619
Missouri ‍‍‍	5	–	5	–	0	.500	13	–	8	–	0	.619
Oklahoma ‍‍‍	4	–	5	–	1	.450	11	–	7	–	1	.605
Baylor ‍‍‍	4	–	6	–	0	.400	8	–	10	–	0	.444
Iowa State ‍‍‍	3	–	5	–	2	.400	5	–	11	–	2	.333
Oklahoma State ‍‍‍	2	–	7	–	1	.250	8	–	10	–	1	.447
Colorado ‍‍‍	1	–	7	–	2	.200	3	–	11	–	2	.250
Texas Tech ‍‍‍	0	–	10	–	0	.000	4	–	15	–	0	.211
† – Conference champion ‡ – Tournament champion y – Invited to the NCAA tournament Rankings from NSCAA Coaches

The 2001 Big 12 Conference women's soccer tournament was the postseason women's soccer tournament for the Big 12 Conference held from November 8 to 11, 2001. The 7-match tournament was held at the Blossom Athletic Center in San Antonio, TX with a combined attendance of 7,482. The 8-team single-elimination tournament consisted of three rounds based on seeding from regular season conference play. The Texas A&M Aggies defeated the Texas Longhorns in the championship match to win their 2nd conference tournament.

== Regular season standings ==
Place	Seed	Team	Conference					Overall			
Place	Seed	Team	W	L	T	%	Pts	W	L	T	%
1	1	Texas	9	1	0	.900	27	14	6	0	.700
2	2	Nebraska	8	1	1	.850	25	17	5	1	.761
2	3	Texas A&M	8	1	1	.850	25	17	4	1	.795
4	4	Kansas	7	3	0	.700	21	13	8	0	.619
5	5	Missouri	5	5	0	.500	15	13	8	0	.619
6	6	Oklahoma	4	5	1	.450	13	11	7	1	.605
7	7	Baylor	4	6	0	.400	12	8	10	0	.444
8	8	Iowa State	3	5	2	.400	11	5	11	2	.333
9		Oklahoma State	2	7	1	.250	7	8	10	1	.447
10		Colorado	1	7	2	.200	5	3	11	2	.250
11		Texas Tech	0	10	0	.000	0	4	15	0	.211

== Bracket ==
Quarterfinals; Thursday, Nov 8
1	Texas	6
8	Iowa State	0
4	Kansas	0^{2OT}
5	Missouri	1^{2OT}
2	Nebraska	5
7	Baylor	1
3	Texas A&M	1^{OT}
6	Oklahoma	0^{OT}

Semifinals; Friday, Nov 9
1	Texas	1^{4OT}
5	Missouri	0^{4OT}
2	Nebraska	2
3	Texas A&M	3

Final; Sunday, Nov 11
1	Texas	0
3	Texas A&M	1

== Awards ==
=== Most valuable player ===
- Offensive MVP – Linsey Johnson – Texas A&M
- Defensive MVP – Laura Kram – Texas

=== All-Tournament team ===
Position	Player	Team
GK	Megan Duncan	Missouri
D	Laura Kram	Texas
D	Dyana Russell	Missouri
D	Adrienne Dillard	Texas A&M
D	Jessica Martin	Texas A&M
MF	Meghan Anderson	Nebraska
MF	Kati McBain	Texas
MF	Kori Saunders	Nebraska
MF	Kristen Teter	Texas
F	Nicky Thrasher	Texas A&M
F	Linsey Johnson	Texas A&M
F	Christine Latham	Nebraska
