= 2018 Big 12 Conference women's soccer tournament =

- Classification: Division I
- Teams: 8
- Matches: 7
- Attendance: 2,138
- Site: Swope Soccer Village; Kansas City, Missouri
- Champions: West Virginia (4th title)
- Winning coach: Nikki Izzo-Brown (4th title)
- MVP: Sh'Nia Gordon (Offensive); Easther Mayi Kith (Defensive) (West Virginia)
- Broadcast: Big 12 Digital Network (Quarterfinals and Semifinals); Fox Sports 1 (Final)

2018 Big 12 Conference women's soccer standings
	Conf.						Overall
Team	W		L		T	PCT	W		L		T	PCT
No. 9 Baylor ‍†‍‍^{y}	8	–	1	–	0	.889	20	–	6	–	0	.769
No. 14 West Virginia ‍‍‡‍^{y}	7	–	2	–	0	.778	15	–	4	–	4	.739
No. 20 Texas ‍‍‍^{y}	5	–	3	–	1	.611	13	–	5	–	3	.690
TCU ‍‍‍^{y}	5	–	3	–	1	.611	13	–	5	–	3	.690
No. 24 Texas Tech ‍‍‍^{y}	5	–	3	–	1	.611	14	–	5	–	3	.705
Kansas ‍‍‍^{y}	5	–	4	–	0	.556	12	–	6	–	3	.643
Oklahoma ‍‍‍	3	–	5	–	1	.389	7	–	10	–	2	.421
Oklahoma State ‍‍‍	2	–	6	–	1	.278	10	–	7	–	1	.583
Iowa State ‍‍‍	2	–	6	–	1	.278	4	–	14	–	2	.250
Kansas State ‍‍‍	0	–	9	–	0	.000	4	–	12	–	2	.278
† – Conference champion ‡ – Tournament champion y – Invited to the NCAA tournament Rankings from United Soccer Coaches

The 2018 Big 12 Conference women's soccer tournament was the postseason women's soccer tournament for the Big 12 Conference held from October 28– November 4, 2018. The seven-match tournament took place at the Swope Soccer Village in Kansas City, Missouri. The eight-team single-elimination tournament consisted of three rounds based on seeding from regular season conference play. The Baylor Bears were the defending champions and earned the top seed in 2018, facing eight seeded Iowa State in the first round (Iowa State won tiebreaker over Oklahoma State via head-to-head record). However, Baylor was not able to defend its crown, losing to West Virginia in the final.

== Regular season standings ==
Place	Seed	Team	Conference					Overall			
Place	Seed	Team	W	L	T	%	Pts	W	L	T	%
1	1	Baylor	8	1	0	.889	24	20	6	0	.769
2	2	West Virginia	7	2	0	.778	21	15	4	4	.739
3	3	Texas	5	3	1	.611	16	13	5	3	.690
3	4	TCU	5	3	1	.611	16	13	5	3	.690
3	5	Texas Tech	5	3	1	.611	16	14	5	3	.705
6	6	Kansas	5	4	0	.556	15	12	6	3	.643
7	7	Oklahoma	3	5	1	.389	10	7	10	2	.421
8	8	Iowa State	2	6	1	.278	7	4	14	2	.250
8		Oklahoma State	2	6	1	.278	7	7	10	1	.417
10		Kansas State	0	9	0	.000	0	4	12	2	.278

== Bracket ==
Quarterfinals; Wednesday, Oct. 28
1	Baylor	3
8	Iowa State	0
4	TCU	0 (3)
5	Texas Tech	0 (5)
2	West Virginia	3
7	Oklahoma	0
3	Texas	0 (3)
6	Kansas	0 (1)

Semifinals; Friday, Nov. 2
1	Baylor	2^{OT}
5	Texas Tech	1
2	West Virginia	1
3	Texas	0

Final; Sunday, Nov. 4
1	Baylor	0
2	West Virginia	3

== Schedule ==
=== Quarterfinals ===
October 28, 2018	#1 Baylor	3–0	#8 Iowa State	Kansas City, Missouri
11:30 a.m. CDT	Elena Reyna 34'; Julie James 49'; Taylor Moon 64'	Report		Stadium: Swope Soccer Village; Attendance: 729; Referee: Tim Debysingh; Assistant referees: Jamie Willis; Emily Fletcher; Fourth official: Shane Butler

October 28, 2018	#4 TCU	0–0 (a.e.t.) (3–5 p)	#5 Texas Tech	Kansas City, Missouri
2:00 p.m. CDT	Kayla Hill (yellow card) 72'	Report	Jade King (yellow card) 99'	Stadium: Swope Soccer Village; Attendance: 212
	Penalties
	Kayla Hill (penalty scored); McKenzie Oliver (penalty missed); Yazmeen Ryan (penalty scored); Maddy Warren (penalty scored)		Carly Wickenheiser (penalty scored); Ally Griffin (penalty scored); Charlotte Teeter (penalty scored); Marissa Zucchetto (penalty scored); Jade King (penalty scored)

October 28, 2018	#2 West Virginia	3–0	#7 Oklahoma	Kansas City, Missouri
5:30 p.m. CDT	Sh'Nia Gordon 45'; Nadya Gill 66'; Lauren Segalla 85'	Report		Stadium: Swope Soccer Village; Attendance: 221; Referee: Shane Butler; Assistant referees: Emily Fletcher; Jamie Willis; Fourth official: Katja Koroleva

October 28, 2018	#3 Texas	0–0 (a.e.t.) (3–1 p)	#6 Kansas	Kansas City, Missouri
8:00 p.m. CDT		Report		Stadium: Swope Soccer Village; Attendance: 275; Referee: Katja Koroleva; Assistant referees: Dan Thornberry; Ryan Cook; Fourth official: Lance VanHaitsma
	Penalties
	Emma Jett (penalty scored); Kayra Dollas (penalty scored); Chelsea Surpris (penalty missed); Cyera Hintzen (penalty scored)		Grace Hagan (penalty missed); Ceri Holland (penalty scored); Kaycie Young (penalty missed); Katie McClure (penalty missed)

=== Semifinals ===
November 2, 2018	#1 Baylor	2–1 (a.e.t.)	#5 Texas Tech	Kansas City, Missouri
4:30 p.m. CDT	Raegan Padgett (yellow card) 28'; Julie James 44'; Jackie Crowther 92'	Report	Kirsten Davis 55'	Stadium: Swope Soccer Village; Attendance: 251; Referee: Marco Vega; Assistant referees: Emily Fletcher; Kermit Quisenberry; Fourth official: Shane Butler

November 2, 2018	#2 West Virginia	1–0	#3 Texas	Kansas City, Missouri
7:00 p.m. CDT	Sh'Nia Gordon 63'; Bianca St-Georges (yellow card) 88'	Report		Stadium: Swope Soccer Village; Attendance: 215; Referee: Nicola Aleksic; Assistant referees: Matt Rodman; Chris Strickland; Fourth official: Marco Vega

=== Final ===
November 4, 2018	#1 Baylor	0–3	#2 West Virginia	Kansas City, Missouri
2:30 p.m. CST	Camryn Wendlandt (yellow card) 48'; Taylor Moon (yellow card) 72'	Report	Baylor Own Goal 35' (o.g.); Amanda Saymon 76'; Lauren Segalla 84'	Stadium: Swope Soccer Village; Attendance: 235; Referee: Kevin Terry; Assistant referees: Ryan Cook; Emily Fletcher; Fourth official: Shane Butler

== Statistics ==
=== Goalscorers ===
There were 13 goals scored in 7 matches, for an average of 1.86 goals per match.

2 goals

- Sh'Nia Gordon – West Virginia
- Julie James – Baylor
- Lauren Segalla – West Virginia

1 goal

- Jackie Crowther – Baylor
- Kirsten Davis – Texas Tech
- Nadya Gill – West Virginia
- Taylor Moon – Baylor
- Elena Reyna – Baylor
- Amanda Saymon – West Virginia

1 own goal

- Baylor vs. West Virginia

== Awards ==
=== Most valuable player ===
- Offensive MVP – Sh'Nia Gordon – West Virginia
- Defensive MVP – Easther Mayi Kith – West Virginia

=== All-Tournament team ===
Position	Player	Team
GK	Rylee Foster	West Virginia
D	Sarah King	Baylor
D	Bianca St-Georges	West Virginia
D	Easther Mayi Kith	West Virginia
MF	Julie James	Baylor
MF	Haley Berg	Texas
MF	Nadya Gill	West Virginia
F	Jackie Crowther	Baylor
F	Taylor Moon	Baylor
F	Kirsten Davis	Texas Tech
F	Sh'Nia Gordon	West Virginia
F	Lauren Segalla	West Virginia
