= 2010 Big 12 Conference women's soccer tournament =

Collegiate women's soccer tournament

- Classification: Division I
- Teams: 8
- Matches: 7
- Attendance: 3,362
- Site: Blossom Athletic Center; San Antonio, TX
- Champions: Oklahoma State (3rd title)
- Winning coach: Colin Carmichael (2nd title)

2010 Big 12 Conference women's soccer standings
	Conf.						Overall
Team	W		L		T	PCT	W		L		T	PCT
No. 16 Texas A&M ‍†‍‍^{y}	8	–	1	–	1	.850	15	–	5	–	3	.717
No. 5 Oklahoma State ‍‍‡‍^{y}	8	–	2	–	0	.800	20	–	4	–	2	.808
Nebraska ‍‍‍	5	–	4	–	1	.550	13	–	7	–	1	.643
Oklahoma ‍‍‍^{y}	5	–	4	–	1	.550	12	–	8	–	3	.587
Texas ‍‍‍^{y}	4	–	3	–	3	.550	11	–	6	–	4	.619
Missouri ‍‍‍	5	–	5	–	0	.500	7	–	10	–	2	.421
Texas Tech ‍‍‍	4	–	5	–	1	.450	11	–	8	–	1	.575
Colorado ‍‍‍	4	–	5	–	1	.450	8	–	10	–	2	.450
Baylor ‍‍‍	4	–	6	–	0	.400	11	–	7	–	2	.600
Iowa State ‍‍‍	3	–	7	–	0	.300	8	–	10	–	2	.450
Kansas ‍‍‍	1	–	9	–	0	.100	6	–	13	–	0	.316
† – Conference champion ‡ – Tournament champion y – Invited to the NCAA tournament Rankings from NSCAA Coaches

The 2010 Big 12 Conference women's soccer tournament was the postseason women's soccer tournament for the Big 12 Conference held from November 3 to 7, 2010. The 7-match tournament was held at the Blossom Athletic Center in San Antonio, TX with a combined attendance of 3,362. The 8-team single-elimination tournament consisted of three rounds based on seeding from regular season conference play. The Oklahoma State Cowgirls defeated the Oklahoma Sooners in the championship match to win their 3rd conference tournament.

== Regular season standings ==
Place	Seed	Team	Conference					Overall			
Place	Seed	Team	W	L	T	%	Pts	W	L	T	%
1	1	Texas A&M	8	1	1	.850	25	15	5	3	.717
2	2	Oklahoma State	8	2	0	.800	24	20	4	2	.808
3	3	Nebraska	5	4	1	.550	16	13	7	1	.643
3	4	Oklahoma	5	4	1	.550	16	12	8	3	.587
5	5	Texas	4	3	3	.550	15	11	6	4	.619
5	6	Missouri	5	5	0	.500	15	7	10	2	.421
7	7	Texas Tech	4	5	1	.450	13	11	8	1	.575
7	8	Colorado	4	5	1	.450	13	8	10	2	.450
9		Baylor	4	6	0	.400	12	11	7	2	.600
10		Iowa State	3	7	0	.300	9	8	10	2	.450
11		Kansas	1	9	0	.100	3	6	13	0	.316

== Bracket ==
Quarterfinals; Wednesday, Nov 3
1	Texas A&M	0 (5)
8	Colorado	0 (4)
4	Oklahoma	3
5	Texas	1
2	Oklahoma State	3
7	Texas Tech	1
3	Nebraska	4
6	Missouri	1

Semifinals; Friday, Nov 5
1	Texas A&M	0^{OT}
4	Oklahoma	1^{OT}
2	Oklahoma State	3^{OT}
3	Nebraska	2^{OT}

Final; Sunday, Nov 7
4	Oklahoma	1 (4)
2	Oklahoma State	1 (5)

== Awards ==
=== Most valuable player ===
- Offensive MVP – Morgan Marlborough – Nebraska
- Defensive MVP – Melinda Mercado – Oklahoma State

=== All-Tournament team ===
Position	Player	Team
GK	Adrianna Franch	Oklahoma State
D	Melinda Mercado	Oklahoma State
D	Lauren Alkek	Oklahoma
D	Alyssa Mautz	Texas A&M
MF	Rachel Shipley	Texas A&M
MF	Kristen Kelly	Oklahoma State
MF	Dria Hampton	Oklahoma
F	Morgan Marlborough	Nebraska
F	Krista Lopez	Oklahoma State
F	Whitney Palmer	Oklahoma
F	Jordan Jackson	Nebraska
