= 2012 Big 12 Conference women's soccer tournament =

- Classification: Division I
- Teams: 8
- Matches: 7
- Attendance: 2,928
- Site: Blossom Athletic Center; San Antonio, TX
- Champions: Baylor (1st title)
- Winning coach: Marci Jobson (1st title)

2012 Big 12 Conference women's soccer standings
| | Conf. | | | | | | Overall |
| Team | W | | L | | T | PCT | W | | L | | T | PCT |
|---|---|---|---|---|---|---|---|---|---|---|---|---|
| West Virginia ‍†‍‍^{y} | 7 | – | 0 | – | 1 | .938 | 11 | – | 5 | – | 4 | .650 |
| No. 11 Baylor ‍‍‡‍^{y} | 5 | – | 0 | – | 3 | .813 | 19 | – | 1 | – | 5 | .860 |
| No. 25 Texas Tech ‍‍‍^{y} | 5 | – | 2 | – | 1 | .688 | 16 | – | 6 | – | 1 | .717 |
| Texas ‍‍‍ | 4 | – | 4 | – | 0 | .500 | 8 | – | 10 | – | 2 | .450 |
| Oklahoma ‍‍‍ | 3 | – | 3 | – | 2 | .500 | 7 | – | 9 | – | 4 | .450 |
| Kansas ‍‍‍ | 3 | – | 5 | – | 0 | .375 | 10 | – | 8 | – | 2 | .550 |
| Oklahoma State ‍‍‍ | 1 | – | 4 | – | 3 | .313 | 11 | – | 6 | – | 3 | .625 |
| TCU ‍‍‍ | 1 | – | 5 | – | 2 | .250 | 7 | – | 10 | – | 4 | .429 |
| Iowa State ‍‍‍ | 1 | – | 7 | – | 0 | .125 | 10 | – | 10 | – | 0 | .500 |
† – Conference champion ‡ – Tournament champion y – Invited to the NCAA Tournament; Rankings from NSCAA Coaches

The 2012 Big 12 Conference women's soccer tournament was the postseason women's soccer tournament for the Big 12 Conference held from October 31 to November 4, 2012. The 7-match tournament was held at the Blossom Athletic Center in San Antonio, TX with a combined attendance of 2,928. The 8-team single-elimination tournament consisted of three rounds based on seeding from regular season conference play. The Baylor Lady Bears defeated the TCU Horned Frogs in the championship match to win their 1st conference tournament.

== Regular season standings ==
| Place | Seed | Team | Conference | | | | | Overall | | | |
| Place | Seed | Team | W | L | T | % | Pts | W | L | T | % |
|---|---|---|---|---|---|---|---|---|---|---|---|
| 1 | 1 | West Virginia | 7 | 0 | 1 | .938 | 22 | 11 | 5 | 4 | .650 |
| 2 | 2 | Baylor | 5 | 0 | 3 | .813 | 18 | 19 | 1 | 5 | .860 |
| 3 | 3 | Texas Tech | 5 | 2 | 1 | .688 | 16 | 16 | 6 | 1 | .717 |
| 4 | 4 | Texas | 4 | 4 | 0 | .500 | 12 | 8 | 10 | 2 | .450 |
| 5 | 5 | Oklahoma | 3 | 3 | 2 | .500 | 11 | 7 | 9 | 4 | .450 |
| 6 | 6 | Kansas | 3 | 5 | 0 | .375 | 9 | 10 | 8 | 2 | .550 |
| 7 | 7 | Oklahoma State | 1 | 4 | 3 | .313 | 6 | 11 | 6 | 3 | .625 |
| 8 | 8 | TCU | 1 | 5 | 2 | .250 | 5 | 7 | 10 | 4 | .429 |
| 9 | | Iowa State | 1 | 7 | 0 | .125 | 3 | 10 | 10 | 0 | .500 |

== Bracket ==
Quarterfinals; Wednesday, Oct 31
1 | West Virginia | 0
8 | TCU | 2
4 | Texas | 3
5 | Oklahoma | 0
2 | Baylor | 3
7 | Oklahoma State | 0
3 | Texas Tech | 2
6 | Kansas | 0

Semifinals; Friday, Nov 2
8 | TCU | 0 (4)
4 | Texas | 0 (2)
2 | Baylor | 2
3 | Texas Tech | 1

Final; Sunday, Nov 4
8 | TCU | 1
2 | Baylor | 4

== Awards ==
=== Most valuable player ===
- Offensive MVP – Dana Larsen – Baylor
- Defensive MVP – Vittoria Arnold – TCU

=== All-Tournament team ===
| Position | Player | Team |
|---|---|---|
| GK | Vittoria Arnold | TCU |
| D | Kat Ludlow | Baylor |
| D | Kelly Johnson | TCU |
| D | Brooke Gilbert | Texas |
| MF | Hanna Gilmore | Baylor |
| MF | Lisa Sliwinski | Baylor |
| MF | Monica Alvarado | TCU |
| MF | Bobbi Clemmer | TCU |
| F | Dana Larsen | Baylor |
| F | Kelsey Shimmick | Texas |
| F | Janine Beckie | Texas Tech |
