= 2019 Big 12 Conference women's soccer tournament =

Collegiate women's soccer tournament

- Classification: Division I
- Teams: 8
- Matches: 7
- Attendance: 2,025
- Site: Swope Soccer Village; Kansas City, MO
- Champions: Kansas (1st title)
- Winning coach: Mark Francis (1st title)
- Broadcast: Fox Sports 1 (final only); Big 12 Now (Quarter & Semifinals)

2019 Big 12 Conference women's soccer standings
	Conf.						Overall
Team	W		L		T	PCT	W		L		T	PCT
No. 19 Oklahoma State ‍†‍‍^{y}	7	–	1	–	1	.833	16	–	2	–	3	.833
No. 20 Texas Tech ‍‍‍^{y}	6	–	1	–	2	.778	15	–	3	–	3	.786
Texas ‍‍‍^{y}	6	–	3	–	0	.667	11	–	8	–	1	.575
West Virginia ‍‍‍^{y}	5	–	3	–	1	.611	11	–	7	–	2	.600
No. 11 Kansas ‍‍‡‍^{y}	4	–	2	–	3	.611	16	–	4	–	3	.761
TCU ‍‍‍^{y}	4	–	3	–	2	.556	11	–	8	–	3	.568
Baylor ‍‍‍	4	–	5	–	0	.444	8	–	8	–	3	.500
Oklahoma ‍‍‍	3	–	5	–	1	.389	8	–	9	–	3	.475
Kansas State ‍‍‍	1	–	8	–	0	.111	3	–	13	–	2	.222
Iowa State ‍‍‍	0	–	9	–	0	.000	3	–	15	–	0	.167
† – Conference champion ‡ – Tournament champion y – Invited to the NCAA tournament Rankings from United Soccer Coaches

The 2019 Big 12 Conference women's soccer tournament was the postseason women's soccer tournament for the Big 12 Conference held from November 3 to 10, 2019. The 7-match tournament was held at the Swope Soccer Village in Kansas City, MO with a combined attendance of 2,025. The 8-team single-elimination tournament consisted of three rounds based on seeding from regular season conference play. The Kansas Jayhawks defeated the TCU Horned Frogs in the championship match to win their 1st conference tournament.

== Regular season standings ==
Place	Seed	Team	Conference					Overall			
Place	Seed	Team	W	L	T	%	Pts	W	L	T	%
1	1	Oklahoma State	7	1	1	.833	22	16	2	3	.833
2	2	Texas Tech	6	1	2	.778	20	15	3	3	.786
3	3	Texas	6	3	0	.667	18	11	8	1	.575
4	4	West Virginia	5	3	1	.611	16	11	7	2	.600
5	5	Kansas	4	2	3	.611	15	16	4	3	.761
6	6	TCU	4	3	2	.556	14	11	8	3	.568
7	7	Baylor	4	5	0	.444	12	8	8	3	.500
8	8	Oklahoma	3	5	1	.389	10	8	9	3	.475
9		Kansas State	1	8	0	.111	3	3	13	2	.222
10		Iowa State	0	9	0	.000	0	3	15	0	.167

== Bracket ==
Quarterfinals; Sunday, Nov 3
1	Oklahoma State	2
8	Oklahoma	1
4	West Virginia	0
5	Kansas	2
2	Texas Tech	1
7	Baylor	0
3	Texas	0 (1)
6	TCU	0 (3)

Semifinals; Friday, Nov 8
1	Oklahoma State	1
5	Kansas	2^{2OT}
2	Texas Tech	1
6	TCU	2

Final; Sunday, Nov 10
5	Kansas	1
6	TCU	0

== Awards ==
=== Most valuable player ===
- Defensive MVP – Sarah Peters – Kansas
- Offensive MVP – Messiah Bright – TCU

=== All-Tournament team ===
Position	Player	Team
GK	Sarah Peters	Kansas
D	Isabella Cavalcante	Kansas
D	Addisyn Merrick	Kansas
D	Kim Rodriguez	Oklahoma State
MF	Samantha Barnett	Kansas
MF	Ceri Holland	Kansas
MF	Yazmeen Ryan	TCU
MF	Jordie Harr	Texas Tech
F	Mandi Duggan	Kansas
F	Katie McClure	Kansas
F	Gabriella Coleman	Oklahoma State
F	Messiah Bright	TCU
