= 1996 Big 12 Conference women's soccer tournament =

Collegiate women's soccer tournament

- Classification: Division I
- Teams: 6
- Matches: 5
- Attendance: 240
- Site: World Wide Technology Soccer Park; St. Louis, MO
- Champions: Nebraska (1st title)
- Winning coach: John Walker (1st title)

1996 Big 12 Conference women's soccer standings
	Conf.						Overall
Team	W		L		T	PCT	W		L		T	PCT
No. 6 Nebraska ‍†‍‡‍^{y}	9	–	0	–	0	1.000	23	–	1	–	0	.958
No. 11 Texas A&M ‍‍‍^{y}	8	–	1	–	0	.889	19	–	4	–	0	.826
Baylor ‍‍‍	6	–	2	–	1	.722	17	–	3	–	1	.833
Texas Tech ‍‍‍	5	–	4	–	0	.556	13	–	8	–	0	.619
Missouri ‍‍‍	4	–	5	–	0	.444	6	–	14	–	0	.300
Texas ‍‍‍	4	–	5	–	0	.444	8	–	10	–	2	.450
Kansas ‍‍‍	3	–	5	–	1	.389	7	–	11	–	1	.395
Colorado ‍‍‍	3	–	6	–	0	.333	6	–	10	–	1	.382
Oklahoma State ‍‍‍	1	–	6	–	2	.222	10	–	7	–	2	.579
Iowa State ‍‍‍	0	–	9	–	0	.000	8	–	12	–	0	.400
† – Conference champion ‡ – Tournament champion y – Invited to the NCAA tournament Rankings from NSCAA Coaches

The 1996 Big 12 Conference women's soccer tournament was the postseason women's soccer tournament for the Big 12 Conference held from November 8 to 10, 1996. The 5-match tournament was held at the World Wide Technology Soccer Park in St. Louis, MO with a combined attendance of 240. The 6-team single-elimination tournament consisted of three rounds based on seeding from regular season conference play. The Nebraska Cornhuskers defeated the Texas A&M Aggies in the championship match to win their 1st conference tournament.

== Regular season standings ==
Place	Seed	Team	Conference					Overall			
Place	Seed	Team	W	L	T	%	Pts	W	L	T	%
1	1	Nebraska	9	0	0	1.000	27	23	1	0	.958
2	2	Texas A&M	8	1	0	.889	24	19	4	0	.826
3	3	Baylor	6	2	1	.722	19	17	3	1	.833
4	4	Texas Tech	5	4	0	.556	15	13	8	0	.619
5	5	Missouri	4	5	0	.444	12	6	14	0	.300
5	6	Texas	4	5	0	.444	12	8	10	2	.450
7		Kansas	3	5	1	.389	10	7	11	1	.395
8		Colorado	3	6	0	.333	9	6	10	1	.382
9		Oklahoma State	1	6	2	.222	5	10	7	2	.579
10		Iowa State	0	9	0	.000	0	8	12	0	.400

== Bracket ==
Quarterfinals; Friday, Nov 8
4	Texas Tech	2
5	Missouri	3
3	Baylor	3
6	Texas	1

Semifinals; Saturday, Nov 9
1	Nebraska	2
5	Missouri	1
2	Texas A&M	5^{2OT}
3	Baylor	4^{2OT}

Final; Sunday, Nov 10
1	Nebraska	1^{2OT}
2	Texas A&M	0^{2OT}

== Awards ==
=== most valuable player ===
- Offensive MVP – Courtney Saunders – Baylor
- Defensive MVP – Tina Robinson – Texas A&M

=== All-Tournament team ===
Position	Player	Team
GK	Becky Hornbacher	Nebraska
D	Tina Robinson	Texas A&M
D	Meghan Crona	Baylor
D	Sandy Edwards	Texas A&M
MF	Diana Rowe	Texas A&M
MF	Kari Uppinghouse	Nebraska
MF	Jenny Benson	Nebraska
F	Bryn Blalack	Texas A&M
F	Isabelle Morneau	Nebraska
F	Kristen Koop	Texas A&M
F	Courtney Saunders	Baylor
