= 2026 Big 12 Conference women's soccer tournament =

Collegiate women's soccer tournament

- Classification: Division I
- Teams: 8
- Matches: 7
- Attendance: Texas Health Mansfield Stadium
- Site: Texas Health Mansfield Stadium; Mansfield, TX
- Champions: BYU (2nd title)
- Winning coach: Jennifer Rockwood (2nd title)
- MVP: Mattyn Summers-Oviatt (Offensive); Chelsea Peterson (Defensive) (BYU)
- Broadcast: ESPN+

2026 Big 12 Conference women's soccer standings
	Conf.						Overall
Team	W		L		T	PCT	W		L		T	PCT
No. 14 BYU ‍†‍‡‍^{y}	8	–	1	–	2	.818	13	–	3	–	5	.738
No. 9 Texas Tech ‍‍‍^{y}	8	–	2	–	1	.773	13	–	3	–	4	.750
No. 7 Baylor ‍‍‍^{y}	8	–	2	–	1	.773	17	–	4	–	1	.795
No. 18 Colorado ‍‍‍^{y}	8	–	3	–	0	.727	15	–	4	–	2	.762
No. 19 Kansas ‍‍‍^{y}	7	–	2	–	2	.727	13	–	5	–	2	.700
No. 23 Houston ‍‍‍^{y}	7	–	3	–	1	.682	11	–	5	–	4	.650
UCF ‍‍‍^{y}	6	–	3	–	2	.636	11	–	5	–	2	.667
West Virginia ‍‍‍^{y}	4	–	4	–	3	.500	9	–	4	–	5	.639
Arizona State ‍‍‍	4	–	6	–	1	.409	9	–	7	–	3	.553
Arizona ‍‍‍	2	–	4	–	5	.409	5	–	8	–	6	.421
Oklahoma State ‍‍‍	3	–	6	–	2	.364	7	–	8	–	4	.474
Cincinnati ‍‍‍	2	–	6	–	3	.318	4	–	8	–	6	.389
Kansas State ‍‍‍	2	–	7	–	2	.273	7	–	7	–	5	.500
TCU ‍‍‍	2	–	7	–	2	.273	5	–	9	–	3	.382
Utah ‍‍‍	1	–	7	–	3	.227	4	–	10	–	5	.342
Iowa State ‍‍‍	0	–	9	–	2	.091	4	–	11	–	4	.316
† – Conference champion ‡ – 2026 Big 12 Tournament champion y – Invited to the NCAA Tournament; As of November 22, 2026; Rankings from United Soccer Coaches Poll; Source: The Big 12 Conference

The 2026 Big 12 Conference women's soccer tournament is a postseason women's soccer tournament for the Big 12 Conference that will be held from November 9 to November 14, 2026. The conference has announced that the 7-match tournament will be held at Texas Health Mansfield Stadium in Mansfield, TX.

== Seeding ==
The top eight teams in regular season play qualified for the single-elimination knockout tournament.

Seed	School	Conference Record	Points	Tiebreak
1	BYU	8–1–2	26	
2	Texas Tech	8–2–1	25	1–0 vs Baylor
3	Baylor	8–2–1	25	0–1 vs Texas Tech
4	Colorado	8–3–0	24	
5	Kansas	7–2–2	23	
6	Houston	7–3–1	22	
7	UCF	6–3–2	20	
8	West Virginia	4–4–3	15	

== Bracket ==
Quarterfinals; Monday, November 9
4	Colorado	2
5	Kansas	1
1	BYU (pen.)	1 (4)
8	West Virginia	1 (2)
2	Texas Tech	2
7	UCF	0
3	Baylor	1
6	Houston	0

Semifinals; Wednesday, November 11
4	Colorado	1 (2)
1	BYU (pen.)	1 (4)
2	Texas Tech	1
3	Baylor	2

Championship; Saturday, November 14
1	BYU	3
3	Baylor	2

== Schedule ==
The Women's Big 12 Soccer Tournament will be played from November 9–14, 2026. The games will be played at Texas Health Mansfield Stadium in Mansfield, TX. All games are displayed in Central Time.

=== Quarterfinals ===
November 9, 2027	No. 4 Colorado	2–1 (– p)	No. 5 Kansas	Mansfield, TX
11:30 a.m.	Hope Leyba 72'; Reagan Kotschau 88'	Box Score	Jocelyn Herrema 61'	Stadium: Texas Health Mansfield Stadium; Attendance: 0 Referee: Trevor Wiseman; Assistant referees: Sarieni Vasquez; Eric Aplis; Fourth official: Alexander Connelly
	Penalties
	Jordan Whiteaker (yellow card) 88'

November 9, 2027	No. 1 BYU	1–1 (a.e.t.) (4–2 p)	No. 8 West Virginia	Mansfield, TX
2:00 p.m.	Sophie Sivulich 14'	Box Score	Maya Leoni 90'	Stadium: Texas Health Mansfield Stadium; Attendance: 0 Referee: Rodrigo Albuquerque; Assistant referees: James Duling; Chana Forstall; Fourth official: Richonne Clark
	Penalties
	Mika Krommenhoek (yellow card) 59'; Bella Woods (yellow card) 95'; Mattyn Summers-Oviatt (yellow card) 110'; (penalty scored) Bella Woods; (penalty scored) Mika Krommenhoek; (penalty scored) Mattyn Summers-Oviatt; (penalty scored) Perry Afton		Team (yellow card) 90'; (penalty missed) Nyema Ingleton; (penalty scored) Alexis Pashales; (penalty scored) Kailyn Effah; (penalty missed) Abbey Olexa

November 9, 2027	No. 2 Texas Tech	2–0 (– p)	No. 7 UCF	Mansfield, TX
5:30 p.m.	Gianna Gregoire 31'; Kaitlyn Giametta 72'	Box Score		Stadium: Texas Health Mansfield Stadium; Attendance: 0 Referee: Alexander Connelly; Assistant referees: Ben Cuyler; Sarieni Vasquez; Fourth official: Trevor Wiseman
	Penalties
	Chloe Soto (yellow card) 51'; Kaitlyn Giametta (yellow card) 71'		Jada Silvest (yellow card) 12'

November 9, 2027	No. 3 Baylor	1–0 (– p)	No. 6 Houston	Mansfield, TX
8:00 p.m.	Natalie Vatter 82'	Box Score		Stadium: Texas Health Mansfield Stadium; Attendance: 0 Referee: Richonne Clark; Assistant referees: James Duling; Josh Ell; Fourth official: Rodrigo Albuquerque
	Penalties
	Team (yellow card) 78'

=== Semifinals ===
November 11, 2027	No. 4 Colorado	1–1 (a.e.t.) (2–4 p)	No. 1 BYU	Mansfield, TX
4:30 p.m.	Hope Leyba 7'	Box Score	Mia Goettsche 20'	Stadium: Texas Health Mansfield Stadium; Referee: Brandon Stevis; Assistant referees: Melissa Beck; Eric Guzman; Fourth official: Habeeb Hooshmand
	Penalties
	(penalty scored) Reagan Kotschau; (penalty missed) Faith Leyba; (penalty scored) Jace Holley; (penalty missed) Hope Leyba		Avery Frischknecht (yellow card) 53'; (penalty scored) Bella Woods; (penalty scored) Mika Krommenhoek; (penalty scored) Mattyn Summers-Oviatt; (penalty missed) Afton Perry; (penalty scored) Emma Neff

November 11, 2027	No. 2 Texas Tech	1–2 (a.e.t.) (– p)	No. 3 Baylor	Mansfield, TX
7:00 p.m.	Taylor Zdrojewski 16'	Box Score	Aryanna Jimison 61'; Grace White 105'	Stadium: Texas Health Mansfield Stadium
	Penalties
	Team (yellow card) 11'

=== Final ===
November 14, 2027	No. 1 BYU	3–2 (– p)	No. 3 Baylor	Mansfield, TX
7:00 p.m.	Mattyn Summers-Oviatt 26', 76'; Bella Woods 46'	Box Score	Noelle Sather 55'; Lauren Omholt 79'	Stadium: Texas Health Mansfield Stadium; Attendance: 1,540; Referee: Elvis Osmanovic; Assistant referees: Karsten Gillwald; Kamil Sikora; Fourth official: Carlos De Dios

== Statistics ==
=== Goalscorers ===
There were 18 goals scored in 7 matches, for an average of 2.57 goals per match (as of November 14, 2026).

2 goals

- Mattyn Summers-Oviatt – BYU
- Hope Leyba – Colorado

1 goal

- Aryanna Jimison – Baylor
- Lauren Omholt – Baylor
- Noelle Sather – Baylor
- Natalie Vatter – Baylor
- Grace White – Baylor
- Mia Goettsche – BYU
- Sophie Sivulich – BYU
- Bella Woods – BYU
- Reagan Kotschau – Colorado
- Jocelyn Herrema – Kansas
- Gianna Gregoire – Texas Tech
- Kaitlyn Giametta – Texas Tech
- Taylor Zdrojewski – Texas Tech
- Maya Leoni – West Virginia

== All-Tournament team ==
Position	Player	Team
GK	Azul Alvarez	BYU
GK	Chelsea Peterson^	BYU
D	Avery Frischknecht	BYU
D	Faith Leyba	Colorado
D	Natalie Vatter	Baylor
MF	Aryanna Jimison	Baylor
MF	Noelle Sather	Baylor
MF	Mika Krommenhoek	BYU
F	Mattyn Summers-Oviatt*	BYU
F	Grace White	Baylor
F	Hope Leyba	Colorado
F	Taylor Zdrojewski	Texas Tech

* Offensive MVP
^ Defensive MVP
