= Julie Doyle =

Julie Doyle may refer to:

- Julie Doyle (soccer, born 1996), American former soccer player
- Julie Doyle (soccer, born 1998), American soccer player
