= Renae Cuéllar =

Mexican footballer (born 1990)

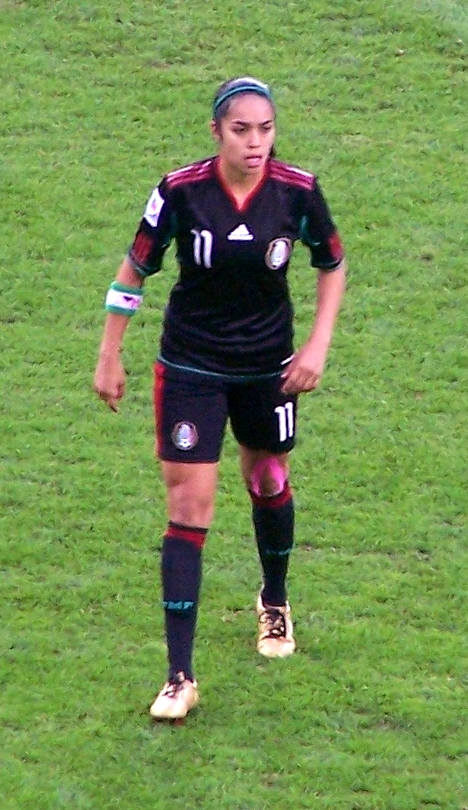

Personal information
- Full name: Renae Nicole Cuéllar Cuéllar
- Birth name: Renae Nicole Garcia
- Date of birth: 24 June 1990 (age 36)
- Place of birth: Bellflower, California, U.S.
- Height: 1.70 m (5 ft 7 in)
- Position: Forward

College career
Years	Team	Apps	(Gls)
2008–2011	Arizona Wildcats		
2012	Oklahoma Sooners		

Senior career*
Years	Team	Apps	(Gls)
2013	FC Kansas City	11	(5)
2013	Seattle Reign FC	7	(0)
2013	→ Sundsvalls DFF (loan)	4	(1)
2014	Washington Spirit	12	(0)
2015	Hwacheon KSPO WFC	15	(6)
2016	BV Cloppenburg	12	(3)
2018–2019	Kiryat Gat	9	(10)
2019	Stjarnan	5	(1)
2019–2023	Tijuana	120	(76)

International career^{‡}
2010	Mexico U20	4+	(2+)
2008–2019	Mexico	39	(10)
- * Club domestic league appearances and goals as of 30 September 2022. ‡ National team caps and goals as of 10 April 2021.

Renae Nicole Cuéllar Cuéllar (born Renae Nicole Garcia, 24 June 1990) is a professional footballer who last played as a forward. Born in the United States, she represented the Mexico national team.

== Early life ==
Born in Bellflower, California to Andrés García and Dolores Cuéllar, Renae attended Los Altos High School in Hacienda Heights, California where she was a three-year letterwinner and three time all-conference, all-city, all-district, all-region, and Offensive Player of the Year. In 2005, she was named 100th Rookie of the Year.

Cuéllar played for the club team CRSC Infinity G U-200000 Premier League and was a member of the Cal South Olympic Development Program State team for five years and Region IV Olympic Development Program for four years. She was also a member of the United States U-14 to U-18 national pool teams.

=== University ===
Cuéllar attended the University of Arizona and played for the Wildcats from 2008 to 2011. As a freshman, she appeared in 19 games for the Wildcats, starting 18 of them as forward. She was named to the All-Pac-10 Freshman team and was selected as honorable mention for the All-Pac-10 Team. She tied for the team lead with five goals and second on the team with assists with two. Cuéllar led the Wildcats in shots on goal with 48, game winning goals with four, and came in second on the team with total points with 12. During her sophomore year, she was responsible for over a third of the team's scoring and nearly a quarter of the team's total attempts at goal. She led the team in points with 12, goals with six, shots at 43 and shots on goal at 21. She was an honorable mention selection to the All-Pac-10 team the same year. As a junior, Cuéllar scored six goals and provided three assists in the first six games of the season, before suffering a season-ending knee injury.

In 2012, she transferred to the University of Oklahoma and played for the Oklahoma Sooners during her senior year. Cuéllar led the Sooners with 26 points from a team-high 12 goals, which ranked as the third-most in a single season in school history. She made OU soccer history by being named the 2012 Big 12 Conference Offensive Player of the Year and became the first member of the Oklahoma program to earn a spot on the National Soccer Coaches Association of America (NSCAA) All-Central Region First Team. Cuellar also earned All-Big 12 First Team and Big 12 All-Newcomer Team honors. She was named Big 12 Newcomer of the Week twice in 2012, earned national honors when she was named Disney Soccer/NSCAA Player of the Week after scoring game-winning goals against Kansas and TCU.

== Playing career ==
=== Club ===
==== FC Kansas City ====
In 2013, as part of the NWSL Player Allocation, Cuéllar joined FC Kansas City in the new National Women's Soccer League. On 13 April, Cuéllar scored the first goal in NWSL history versus Portland Thorns FC. Cuellar made 11 appearances with eight starts for the Blues, scoring five goals. She missed two games after spraining her knee and ankle during a match against the Portland Thorns FC after being tackled by defender, Rachel Buehler. FCKC traded her to Seattle mid-season.

==== Seattle Reign FC ====
On 1 July 2013, FCKC traded Cuéllar to the Seattle Reign FC in exchange for Teresa Noyola, a second-round pick in the 2014 NWSL College Draft and rights to unsigned player, Nikki Krzysik. She made seven appearances for the Reign, including three starts, tallying a total of 342 minutes on the pitch.

==== Sundsvalls DFF ====
After the conclusion of the 2013 NWSL season, Cuéllar signed with Swedish side, Sundsvalls DFF. She made her debut for the club on 22 August in a match against IF Limhamn Bunkeflo. She scored her first goal for the squad on 30 August during the team's 1–5 defeat to Sirius.

==== Washington Spirit ====
In October 2013, Seattle Reign FC traded Cuéllar to the Washington Spirit.

==== Kiryat Gat ====
Cuéllar gave birth to her son Romeo in April 2017. She resumed soccer training with men's club Las Vegas Lights FC, where her husband Carlos Alvarez was on the roster. In August 2018 she agreed a contract with Israeli Ligat Nashim club Kiryat Gat.

==== Stjarnan ====
In March 2019, she signed with Stjarnan of the Icelandic Úrvalsdeild kvenna.

==== Club Tijuana ====
In July 2019, Cuellar signed with Tijuana Xolos in Liga MX Femenil.

=== International ===
Cuéllar represented Mexico at the FIFA U-20 Women's World Cup in Germany in 2010. She scored a goal in Mexico's 3–3 draw against Japan and netted the game winner in the 62nd minute in a 1–0 victory over England.

Cuéllar was an alternate for the Mexico women's national football team at the 2011 FIFA Women's World Cup in Germany.

Cuéllar was named to the Mexico women's national football team roster for the 2015 FIFA Women's World Cup in Canada. Cuéllar played in all three matches for Mexico. When Mexico embarrassingly failed to qualify for the 2019 FIFA Women's World Cup in France, Cuéllar criticized the team's management for not selecting her, alleging that she'd been left out due to her recent childbirth.

== Personal life ==
Cuéllar is married to former footballer Carlos Alvarez. They have a son, Romeo, who was born in April 2017.
