= Katie Hooker =

American soccer player (born 1981)

Personal information
- Full name: Kathleen Marie Hooker
- Birth name: Kathleen Marie Antongiovanni
- Date of birth: November 18, 1981 (age 45)
- Place of birth: Bakersfield, California, U.S.
- Height: 5 ft 4 in (1.63 m)
- Position: Forward

College career
Years	Team	Apps	(Gls)
1999–2000	Iowa State Cyclones		
2001–2002	Denver Pioneers		

Senior career*
Years	Team	Apps	(Gls)
2002	Denver Diamonds		
2003	Atlanta Beat	0	(0)
2003	San Jose CyberRays	11	(1)
2004–2007	Mile High Mustangs/Edge	46	(25)
2004	Denver Diamonds	2	(2)
2006	Denver Diamonds		
2008	Real Colorado Cougars	7	(0)
2009	Los Angeles Sol	0	(0)
2009	Sky Blue FC	2	(0)
- * Club domestic league appearances and goals

Kathleen Marie Hooker (née Antongiovanni; born November 18, 1981) is an American soccer forward who last played for Sky Blue FC of Women's Professional Soccer.
