= Joe Castiglione (athletic director) =

American former college sports administrator

Biographical details
- Born: October 8, 1957 (age 69); Fort Lauderdale, Florida, U.S.
- Education: University of Maryland; University of Oklahoma (M.Ed)

Playing career
- 1977–1978: Maryland
- Position: Safety

Administrative career (AD unless noted)
- 1979: Rice (sports promotions)
- 1980: Georgetown (director of fundraising)
- 1981–1992: Missouri (admin. officer)
- 1993–1998: Missouri
- 1998–2025: Oklahoma

Joseph Robert Castiglione (born October 8, 1957) is a former director of athletics at the University of Missouri and the University of Oklahoma.

During his time as the University of Oklahoma's athletic director from 1998 to 2025, the school won a total of 26 national championships in football (2000); softball (2000, 2013, 2016, 2017, 2021, 2022, 2023, 2024); men's golf (2017); men's gymnastics (2002, 2003, 2005, 2006, 2008, 2015, 2016, 2017, 2018); and women's gymnastics (2014, 2016, 2017, 2019, 2022, 2023, 2025).

== Early career ==
Castiglione is a 1979 graduate of the University of Maryland, where he played college football as a walk-on for the Terrapins. He was the athletic director at the University of Missouri from 1994 to 1998.

== Oklahoma athletic director ==
Among his earliest and best-known moves as OU's AD came in December 1998 with the hiring of head football coach Bob Stoops. Castiglione's decision quickly paid off as Stoops, a first-time head coach, immediately began work rejuvenating a program that had experienced a 10-year decline. Within two seasons, Stoops guided OU to its first national football title in 15 years and first conference championship since 1987. After 18 seasons that included 10 Big 12 titles, victories in all four BCS games (Orange, Rose, Sugar and Fiesta), and four Heisman Trophy Winners (Jason White in 2003, Sam Bradford in 2008, Baker Mayfield in 2017 and Kyler Murray in 2018), Stoops retired in June 2017 as the program's all-time leader in victories with 190.

Castiglione received the 2004 Bobby Dodd Award for athletic director of the year. He was named National Athletic Director of the Year in May 2009 by the SportsBusiness Journal. On February 19, 2018, it was announced he would be inducted into the Oklahoma Sports Hall of fame.

On July 7, 2025, Castiglione announced his retirement as athletic director.

== Personal life ==
He also earned a Master's in Education from Oklahoma in 2007.

A native of Fort Lauderdale, Florida, Castiglione is married to the former Kristen Bartel, a 1990 graduate of the University of Missouri. They are the parents of two sons, Joseph Jr. and Jonathan.
