= Bri Campos =

Mexican footballer (born 1994)

Personal information
- Full name: Briana Marie Campos Barriéntez
- Date of birth: 3 February 1994 (age 32)
- Place of birth: Aurora, Colorado, United States
- Height: 1.60 m (5 ft 3 in)
- Positions: Right back; defensive midfielder

Youth career
- 2007–2010: Colorado Rush

College career
Years	Team	Apps	(Gls)
2012–2015	Baylor Lady Bears	83	(19)

Senior career*
Years	Team	Apps	(Gls)
2016–2019	Åland United	84	(13)
2020	Umeå IK	21	(0)
2021	Vittsjö GIK	19	(0)
2022	Umeå IK	18	(1)

International career^{‡}
2012–2013	Mexico U20	5	(0)
2017–2021	Mexico	3	(0)
- * Club domestic league appearances and goals as of January 18, 2020 ‡ National team caps and goals as of 23 October 2017

Briana Marie "Bri" Campos Barriéntez (born 3 February 1994) is a former professional footballer who last played as a right-back for Swedish Damallsvenskan club Vittsjö GIK. Born in the United States, she represented the Mexico national team.

== Early life ==
Campos was born in Aurora, Colorado, United States to Mexican parents Louie Campos and Celina Barriéntez. She has two sisters named Monica and Larissa.

=== Baylor University ===
Campos attended Baylor University where she majored in health, kinesiology and recreation.

== Club career ==
=== Åland United ===
On 9 February 2016, Finnish side Åland United announced Campos as one of their signings for that year's season.

== International career ==
Campos played for the U-20 Mexican Women's National Team, twice in 2012 and three times in 2013. Her first senior Mexican Women's National Team call up was in September 2017 and she received her first cap on October 24, 2017, versus North Korea in the 2017 Yongchuan International Tournament.
