= Julie Doyle (soccer, born 1996) =

American professional soccer player

Personal information
- Full name: Julie James Doyle
- Birth name: Julie Rachel James
- Date of birth: December 31, 1996 (age 29)
- Place of birth: Fairview, Texas, U.S.
- Height: 5 ft 10 in (1.78 m)
- Position: Midfielder

Youth career
- 2011–2014: McKinney Christian Academy
- Dallas Sting
- 2018: FC Dallas

College career
Years	Team	Apps	(Gls)
2015–2018	Baylor Lady Bears	88	(20)

Senior career*
Years	Team	Apps	(Gls)
2019	Sky Blue FC	16	(0)

International career
2014	United States U-20		
2018–2019	United States U-23		
- * Club domestic league appearances and goals

Julie James Doyle (born Julie Rachel James; December 31, 1996) is an American professional soccer player who played for Sky Blue FC of the National Women's Soccer League (NWSL).

== Early life ==
Doyle played four years for Baylor University finishing her Bears career with a career 20 goals and 13 assists in 88 appearances. During her senior year she was named a semi-finalist for the MAC Hermann Trophy Award as well as became the first student-athlete in Baylor program history to earn the prestigious United Soccer Coaches All-America first team honors.

The two-time captain logged more minutes (7809), the most of any player Baylor Bears women's soccer history. She finished her university career in the top 10 all-time for career goals scored and points totaled.

== Club career ==
Doyle was selected by Sky Blue FC with the 11th overall pick in the 2019 NWSL College Draft. In doing so she became the first student-athlete from Baylor to be drafted into the NWSL. She signed with the club in March 2019.

Doyle made her club regular season debut on April 13, 2019.

== International career ==
In 2018 Doyle was named to several United States U-23 training camps. This was her first national team call up since 2014, when she had trained with the U-20 USWNT.

== Personal life ==
She married Connor Doyle in May 2019.. They currently reside in Virginia.

== Career statistics ==
As of April 20, 2019

League	Club	Season	League			Playoffs		Total	
League	Club	Season	Apps	Assists	Goals	Apps	Goals	Apps	Goals
NCAA	Baylor University	2015	18	1	5	0	0	18	5
NCAA	Baylor University	2016	18	5	3	2	0	20	3
NCAA	Baylor University	2017	20	4	2	4	2	24	4
NCAA	Baylor University	2018	22	3	8	4	1	26	3
NCAA	Baylor University	total	78	13	17	10	3	88	20
WPSL	FC Dallas	2018	2	0	2	-		2	2
WPSL	FC Dallas	total	2	0	2	0	0	2	2
NWSL	Sky Blue FC	2019	1	0	0			1	0
NWSL	Sky Blue FC	total	1	0	0	0	0	1	0
Career total			81	13	19	10	4	91	22
