= Ashlee Pistorius =

American soccer player

Personal information
- Full name: Ashlee Jenae Slayback
- Birth name: Ashlee Jenae Pistorius
- Date of birth: December 1, 1985 (age 40)
- Place of birth: Decatur, Illinois
- Height: 5 ft 9 in (1.75 m)
- Position: Forward

College career
Years	Team	Apps	(Gls)
2004–2007	Texas A&M Aggies		

Senior career*
Years	Team	Apps	(Gls)
2008	Boston Renegades	14	(8)
2009	Saint Louis Athletica	4	(0)

Managerial career
- Ursuline Academy Bears
- St. Charles Cougars (assistant)
- St. Charles Cougars
- 2014–2015: Illinois State Redbirds (assistant)
- * Club domestic league appearances and goals

Ashlee Jenae Slayback (née Pistorius; born December 1, 1985) is an American soccer forward who last played for Saint Louis Athletica of Women's Professional Soccer. In the fall of 2009 she was appointed the new head coach of Ursuline Academy Varsity Soccer.

== College ==
As a senior at Texas A&M, she won the Honda Sports Award as the nation's top soccer player. In 2014, she was inducted into the Texas A&M Athletic Hall of Fame.
