= Oklahoma Sooners women's soccer =

American college soccer team

- Founded: 1996 (30 years ago)
- University: University of Oklahoma
- Athletic director: Roger Denny
- Head coach: Matt Mott (4th season)
- Conference: SEC
- Location: Norman, Oklahoma
- Stadium: John Crain Field (capacity: 3,500)
- Nickname: Sooners
- Colors: Crimson and cream
Home	Away

NCAA tournament Round of 32
- 2016

NCAA tournament appearances
- 2003, 2010, 2014, 2016

The Oklahoma Sooners women's soccer team represents the University of Oklahoma in NCAA Division I college soccer. The team competes in the Southeastern Conference, and plays its home games at John Crain Field in Norman, Oklahoma. The Sooners are currently led by head coach Matt Mott.

== History ==
The Sooners women's soccer program was established in January 1996, becoming the school's 20th sport with Bettina Fletcher being named the first head coach three months later. Fletcher joined the Sooners after previously serving as an assistant coach for North Carolina and UNC Greensboro.

=== 1996–1998: Bettina Fletcher era ===
In their debut game, the Sooners lost 8–0 against Nebraska. On September 6, 1996, the Sooners played their first home game against Regis University where My Ta scored the first goal in team history. Despite a 4–0 loss against the 8th-ranked Texas A&M, Fletcher applauded her team for holding the Aggies to two goals in each half. In the final game of the season, Kayce Casner had the game-winning goal to defeat McNeese State 3–2 for the team's first win. In its first season, the Sooner finished 1–13 with Caser and Mindy Field leading the team in goals.

After finishing 2–14 in their second season, the Sooners went 6–1 at home, 8–9 overall in their third season, however failed to qualify for the six-team Big 12 Conference tournament. Following the season, Fletcher announced her resignation, citing personal and family reasons. In Fletcher's tenure, the Sooners compiled a 11–36 record, 3–16 in conference play in its first three seasons.

=== 1999–2007: Randy Evans era ===
On January 12, 1999, Randy Evans was named as the team's second head coach after serving as an assistant coach for Vanderbilt for six seasons. In Evan's second season, the Sooners qualified for the Big 12 Conference tournament including a team record 10 wins which featured a 2–1 road win against the 2nd-ranked Nebraska. Evan was later named as the Big 12 and the NSCAA Central Region Coach of the Year.

In the 2003 season, the Sooners clinched their first ever NCAA tournament appearance. Despite an 8–5–5 overall record and a loss in the Big 12 tournament, the Sooners received an at-large bid after Oklahoma State defeated Missouri in the championship game. In the tournament, the Sooners were defeated by Tennessee 1–0 in the first round.

The Sooners set team records for wins, goals, assists, and points in its 10th year during the 2005 season. Opening the season, the Sooners recorded their best start in team history at 11–1–1. However the team failed to keep the same momentum on the road, finishing 13–6–1 overall and 5–4–1 in Big 12 play. For the fourth time, the Sooners made an appearance in the Big 12 tournament, but lost against the 2nd-seeded Colorado in the 2005 Big 12 tournament. Despite a team-high in wins, the Sooners were not selected to the 2005 NCAA tournament.

After nine seasons and an overall 78–79–16 record, Evans announced his resignation which was accepted by athletics director Joe Castiglione. With Evans, the Sooners made five Big 12 tournament appearances, an NCAA tournament appearance, and a team-high 13 wins in the 2005 season.

=== 2008–2011: Nicole Nelson era ===
On December 21, 2007, Nicole Nelson was named as the team's third head coach after an impressive three-year tenure as the head coach of Stephen F. Austin and stints as an assistant coach at Texas and Baylor. Nelson, a native of Oklahoma, accumulated a 33–19–9 record while at Stephen F. Austin. After two under .500 seasons, the Sooners posted double-digit wins for the first time since 2005. The Sooners returned to both the Big 12 tournament and the NCAA tournament in 2010. Prior to the Big 12 tournament, Nelson was named as the Big 12 Co-Head Coach of the Year alongside Colin Carmichael. The Sooners defeated then-21st-ranked Texas and then-6th-ranked Texas A&M before falling to longtime rivals Oklahoma State in the championship game. In the NCAA tournament, the Sooners lost in the first round to Washington. After four seasons, Nelson resigned with an overall 29-46-6 record and a Big 12 championship appearance.

=== 2012–2019: Matt Potter era ===
On December 27, 2011, Matt Potter was named as the team's fourth head coach. Potter's head coaching stint with Washington State included three NCAA tournament appearances in the last four years and five double-digit win seasons. Under Porter, the Sooners had their best three seasons in succession from 2014–2016, posting a 34–23–9 overall record. In their best season to date, the Sooners finished the 2016 season with a 14–7–2 overall record and 4–3–1 in conference play. Celebrating their 20th season, the Sooners highlighted their season with a team-high 14 wins and six players being named to All-Big 12 selections. In the 2016 NCAA tournament, the Sooners defeated SMU 1–0 for its first ever NCAA tournament win before losing 2–1 to the 4th-seeded BYU. After eight seasons, athletics director Joe Castiglione and Potter announced that Potter will leave the team at the end of the 2019 season. With Potter, the Sooners owned a 63–77–23 and produced four first-team All-Big 12 selections and six second-team honorees.

=== 2020–2022: Mark Carr era ===
On December 21, 2019, Mark Carr was named as the team's fifth head coach after spending last year as head coach of the Under-20 Women's National Team with U.S. Soccer. In Carr's first season, the Sooners posted an overall record of 1–12–2, their worst season since their inaugural year. In the 2022 season, Carr led the Sooners to their first winning season since 2016 with a 9–8–1 record. During the team's spring exhibition schedule, athletics director Joe Castiglione announced that Carr will not return for a fourth season.

=== 2023–present: Matt Mott era ===
On April 30, 2023, Matt Mott was named as the team's sixth head coach after 13 seasons as the head coach at Ole Miss. With Ole Miss, Mott accumulated a 139–97–32 record, which included six NCAA Tournament appearances.

== Coaches ==
=== History ===
#	Years	Name	Record	W%
1	1996–1998	Bettina Fletcher	11–36	.234
2	1999–2007	Randy Evans	78–79–16	.497
3	2008–2011	Nicole Nelson	29–46–6	.387
4	2012–2019	Matt Potter	63–77–23	.450
5	2020–2022	Mark Carr	18–31–6	.367
6	2023–present	Matt Mott	28-22–7	.553

=== Honors ===
Year	Name	Award
2000	Randy Evans	Big 12 Coach of the Year
2000	Randy Evans	NSCAA Central Region Coach of the Year
2010	Nicole Nelson	Co-Big 12 Coach of the Year

== Seasons ==
Year	Record	Head Coach	Big 12	Big 12 Tournament	NCAA Tournament
1996	1–13–0	Bettina Fletcher	–	DNQ	
1997	2–14–0	Bettina Fletcher	1–9	DNQ	
1998	8–9–0	Bettina Fletcher	2–7	DNQ	
1999	4–13–1	Randy Evans	2–8	DNQ	
2000	10–9–1	Randy Evans	4–5–1	1–1 (Semifinals)	–
2001	11–7–1	Randy Evans	4–5–1	0–1 (Quarterfinals)	–
2002	11–8–0	Randy Evans	4–6	DNQ	
2003	8–7–5	Randy Evans	3–3–4	0–1 (Quarterfinals)	0–1 (First round)
2004	7–8–3	Randy Evans	3–7	–	
2005	13–6–1	Randy Evans	5–4–1	0–1 (Quarterfinals)	–
2006	8–11–1	Randy Evans	3–6–1	0–1 (Quarterfinals)	–
2007	6–10–3	Randy Evans	2–7–1	DNQ	
2008	3–15–1	Nicole Nelson	2–7–1	DNQ	
2009	7–10–2	Nicole Nelson	2–7–1	DNQ	
2010	12–8–3	Nicole Nelson	5–4–1	2–1 (Finals)	0–1 (First round)
2011	7–13–0	Nicole Nelson	2–6–1	0–1 (Quarterfinals)	–
2012	7–9–4	Matt Potter	3–3–2	0–1 (Quarterfinals)	–
2013	4–13–1	Matt Potter	1–7	DNQ	
2014	10–9–4	Matt Potter	3–4–1	2–1 (Finals)	0–1 (First round)
2015	10–7–3	Matt Potter	3–2–3	0–1 (Quarterfinals)	–
2016	14–7–2	Matt Potter	4–3–1	1–1 (Semifinals)	1–1 (Second round)
2017	3–13–4	Matt Potter	1–5–3	0–1 (Quarterfinals)	–
2018	7–10–2	Matt Potter	3–5–1	0–1 (Quarterfinals)	–
2019	8–9–3	Matt Potter	3–5–1	0–1 (Quarterfinals)	–
2020	1–12–2	Mark Carr	1–11–2	DNQ	
2021	8–11–1	Mark Carr	4–5	0–1 (Quarterfinals)	–
2022	9–8–3	Mark Carr	3–5–1	1–1 (Semifinals)	–
2023	8–10–2	Matt Mott	3–5–2	1–1 (Semifinals)	–
2024	10–7–1	Matt Mott	3–6–1	DNQ	
2025	10-5-4	Matt Mott	3-4-3	0-1	-

== Players ==
=== Current roster ===
Note: Flags indicate national team as defined under FIFA eligibility rules; some limited exceptions apply. Players may hold more than one non-FIFA nationality.

No.	Pos.	Nation	Player
0	GK	USA	Olivia Ramey
00	GK	USA	Avery Hall
1	GK	USA	Sierra Giorgio
2	FW	USA	Emma Hawkins
3	MF	USA	Koby Commandant
4	MF	USA	Avery Stevens
5	FW	USA	Hadley Murrell
6	MF	USA	Zoe Parkhurst
7	MF	USA	Michelle Pak
8	MF	USA	Cailey England
9	MF	USA	Keller Matise
10	MF	BOT	Esalenna Galekhutle
11	MF	USA	Sophia Vaughan
12	FW	USA	Alexis Washington
14	MF	USA	Kelis Brown
15	FW	USA	Ella Pappas
16	FW	USA	Dani Wolfe
17	DF	USA	Chloe Adams
18	FW	USA	Lauren Hoefer

No.	Pos.	Nation	Player
19	DF	USA	Andie Wolfe
20	FW	USA	Chelsea Wagner
22	FW	USA	Muriel Kroflin
23	FW	USA	Cassie Clifton
24	FW	USA	Morganne Eikelbarner
28	DF	FRA	Leane Commaret
31	FW	GER	Leonie Weber
40	DF	USA	Marianne Baltmanis

=== Honors ===
Big 12 Player of the Year

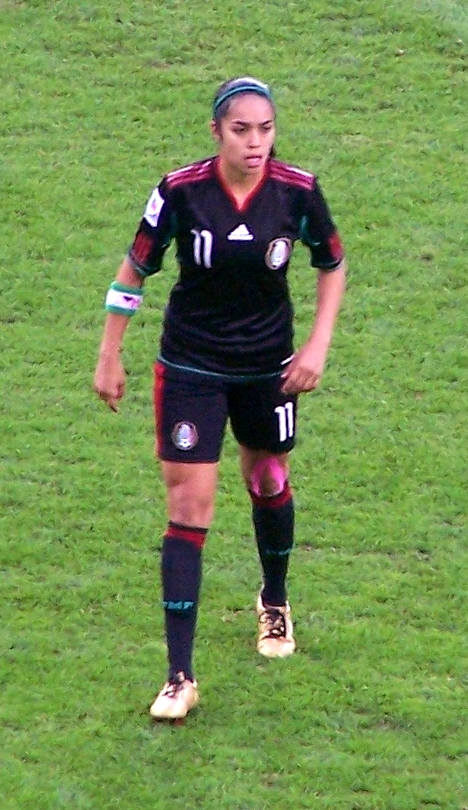
Renae Cuéllar

Renae Cuéllar (2012)
Cuéllar led the Sooners with 26 points from a team-high 12 goals during the regular season, which ranks as the third-most in a single season in Oklahoma history at that time. Her 13 points from six goals in eight Big 12 matches paces the conference.

Year	Name
2012	Renae Cuéllar

All-Big 12

Logan Womack (2000–02)
Womack became the first Sooner to ever earn all-conference first-team honors. At the time, she ranked all-time in goals at 20 and points at 43.
Whitney Palmer (2007–10)
Palmer became the third Sooner to be selected to first team. At the time, she ranked second all-time with 29 career goals and third with 61 points.
Kaylee Dao (2017–19)
Dao led the Sooners in goals in all three seasons, became third all-time in team history with 29 career goals, and second all-time with 11 game-winning goals at the time.

Year	Name	Award
1999	Christen Secrest	Second Team
2000	Logan Womack	Second Team
2000	Logan Womack	Newcomer
2000	Bridgette Smith	All-Tournament
2001	Logan Womack	First Team
2002	Lauren MacIver	Second Team
2002	Logan Womack	Second Team
2002	Lauren MacIver	Newcomer
2003	Lauren MacIver	Second Team
2003	Erin Young	Second Team

Year	Name	Award
2005	Lauren MacIver	First Team
2007	Whitney Palmer	Newcomer
2008	Whitney Palmer	Second Team
2009	Whitney Palmer	First Team
2010	Whitney Palmer	Second Team
2010	Caitlin Mooney	Newcomer
2010	Dria Hampton	All-Tournament
2010	Whitney Palmer	All-Tournament
2012	Renae Cuéllar	First Team
2012	Renae Cuéllar	Newcomer

Year	Name	Award
2013	Jemma Cota	Newcomer
2013	Paige Jacobs	Newcomer
2014	Lizzie Luallin	Newcomer
2014	Laura Rayfield	Newcomer
2014	Devin Barrett	All-Tournament
2014	Madeline Brem	All-Tournament
2014	Abby Hodgen	All-Tournament
2014	Laura Rayfield	All-Tournament
2015	Rachel Ressler	Second Team
2015	Kaylee Dao	Freshman Team

Year	Name	Award
2016	Rachel Ressler	First Team
2016	Jemma Cota	Second Team
2016	Liz Keester	Second Team
2016	Tori Bowman	Second Team
2016	Paige Welch	Second Team
2016	Kristina O'Donnell	Freshman Team
2016	Liz Keester	All-Tournament
2017	Kaylee Dao	First Team
2018	Kaylee Dao	First Team
2018	Paige Welch	Second Team

Year	Name	Award
2019	Kaylee Dao	First Team
2019	Maya McCutcheon	Newcomer
2020	Cailey England	Newcomer
2022	Sheridan Michel	Second Team
2022	Hali Hartman	Freshman Team
2022	Alexis Washington	Freshman Team
