= Blossom Athletic Center =

Multi-sport athletic complex in San Antonio, Texas

Coordinates: 29.549995°N 98.470724°W

The Virgil T. Blossom Athletic Center is a multi-sport athletic complex owned by the North East ISD located in San Antonio, Texas. Best known for Comalander Stadium, a 10,952-seat football stadium, the center is also home to facilities for a number of other sports. The Josh Davis Natatorium, named for the former olympic swimmer, is a state-of-the-art, 1500-seat swimming facility. The Jimmy Littleton Gymnasium is a 5000-seat basketball, volleyball and wrestling facility. Additionally, there is an 18-court tennis center, two soccer fields, a baseball stadium, and track and field facilities.

== History ==
The complex started with the construction of the football stadium which was funded by a 1960 bond and completed in 1962. The aquatics center followed in 1964 and the field house in 1966. In 1967 the center was named for the first district superintendent, Virgil T. Blossom. The complex further expanded in 1970 with the addition of a baseball stadium, then again in 1973 with the addition of eight tennis courts. In 2001 the Davis Natatorium was added.

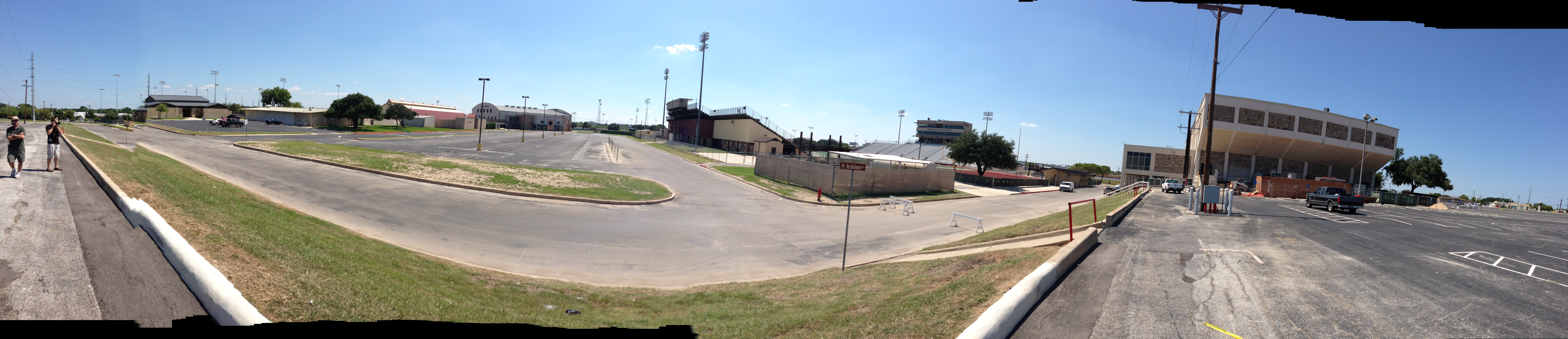
Blossom Athletic Center
