= Baylor Bears women's soccer =

American college soccer team

- Founded: 1996; 30 years ago
- University: Baylor University
- Athletic director: Doug McNamee
- Head coach: Michelle Lenard (5th season)
- Conference: Big 12
- Location: Waco, Texas, US
- Stadium: Betty Lou Mays Soccer Field (capacity: 3,000)
- Nickname: Bears
- Colors: Green and gold

NCAA tournament Quarterfinals
- 2017, 2018

NCAA tournament Round of 16
- 2012, 2017, 2018, 2025

NCAA tournament Round of 32
- 1998, 2011, 2012, 2017, 2018, 2025

NCAA tournament appearances
- 1998, 1999, 2011, 2012, 2017, 2018, 2025, 2026

Conference tournament championships
- 2012, 2017

Conference regular season championships
- 1998, 2018

The Baylor Bears women's soccer team represents Baylor University in the Big 12 Conference of NCAA Division I college soccer. Before the 1996 season, the team participated as a club sport. The team is coached by Michelle Lenard and has made the NCAA Tournament 7 times. The team plays its home games at Betty Lou Mays Soccer Field.

== History ==
Baylor women's soccer began in 1996. The team achieved notable success early on, with Baylor becoming Big 12 conference champions and earning a spot in the NCAA tournament in 1998. The following year, in 1999, the Bears once again made the NCAA tournament. After a period of consistent appearances, Baylor returned to the NCAA tournament in 2011. In 2012, the team secured a conference title by defeating TCU and once again advanced to the NCAA tournament. The Bears continued their strong performance by winning the conference title and participating in the NCAA tournament in 2017, and they made the tournament again in 2018. Most recently, in 2025, Baylor earned an at-large bid to the NCAA tournament after finishing the season with a 13–4–4 record.

== Results by season ==
Season Results
Year	Coach	Overall record	Conference record	Conference standing	Postseason
(Big 12 Conference) (1996–Present)
1996	Randy Waldrum	17–3–1	6–2–1	3rd	–
1997	Randy Waldrum	14–6–1	7–3–0	3rd	–
1998	Randy Waldrum	15–5–1	9–0–1	1st	NCAA First Round
1999	Nick Cowell	14–7–1	6–3–1	4th	NCAA First Round
2000	Nick Cowell	10–6–3	6–2–2	4th	–
2001	Nick Cowell	8–10–0	4–6–0	7th	–
2002	Nick Cowell	8–9–2	2–6–2	10th	–
2003	George Van Linder	7–9–2	2–6–2	10th	–
2004	George Van Linder	7–9–2	3–6–1	9th	–
2005	George Van Linder	4–12–2	2–7–1	10th	–
2006	George Van Linder	7–10–2	1–8–1	10th	–
2007	George Van Linder	6–12–1	3–7–0	8th	–
2008	Marci Jobson	5–11–3	1–7–2	10th	–
2009	Marci Jobson	8–6–5	3–4–3	7th	–
2010	Marci Jobson	11–7–2	4–6–0	9th	–
2011	Marci Jobson	15–4–3	5–2–1	3rd	NCAA Round of 32
2012	Marci Jobson	19–1–5	5–0–3	2nd	Big 12 Conference Tournament Champions; NCAA Round of 16
2013	Marci & Paul Jobson	11–6–3	3–4–1	5th	–
2014	Marci & Paul Jobson	9–8–3	2–5–1	7th	–
2015	Paul Jobson	9–6–4	4–1–2	2nd	–
2016	Paul Jobson	12–7–1	4–3–1	T–3rd	–
2017	Paul Jobson	15–6–3	4–4–1	5th	Big 12 Conference Tournament Champions; NCAA Elite 8
2018	Paul Jobson	20–6–0	8–1–0	1st	NCAA Elite 8
2019	Paul Jobson	8–8–3	4–5–0	7th	–
2020	Paul Jobson	5–5–3	3–3–3	4th	–
2021	Paul Jobson	8–5–6	4–2–3	3rd	–
2022	Michelle Lenard	4–11–2	2–7–0	9th	–
2023	Michelle Lenard	9–7–3	4–2–2	8th	–
2024	Michelle Lenard	8–8–5	2–5–4	10th	–
2025	Michelle Lenard	14–5–4	7–3–1	5th	NCAA Round of 16
Totals: 30 Years – 6 Coaches		307-215-76 (.577)		4 Conference championships	7 Postseason appearances

== Current roster ==
As of June 2026

Note: Flags indicate national team as defined under FIFA eligibility rules; some limited exceptions apply. Players may hold more than one non-FIFA nationality.

No.	Pos.	Nation	Player
0	GK	CAN	Sierra Gallant
00	GK	USA	Hailey Smith
1	GK	USA	Azul Alvarez
2	DF	USA	Sydney Miller
3	DF	USA	Natalie Vatter
4	MF	USA	Olivia Hess
5	FW	USA	Lauren Omholt
6	MF	CAN	Noelle Sather
7	MF	USA	Adriana Merriam
8	MF	USA	Taylor Evans
9	FW	USA	Callie Conrad
10	MF	USA	Aryanna Jimison
11	MF	USA	Brynnlee Bohannon
12	DF	USA	Emerson Garcia
13	DF	CAN	Keira Martin

No.	Pos.	Nation	Player
14	FW	USA	Theresa McCullough
15	FW	USA	Grace White
16	FW	USA	Tatum Greensage
17	DF	USA	Chloe Adams
18	FW	USA	Kendall Mason
19	DF	USA	Bella James
20	DF	USA	Nyela Calnek
21	FW	USA	Skylar Zinnecker
22	FW	USA	Kate Runyon
23	DF	USA	Ava Slay
24	MF	USA	Ava Verplancke
33	MF	USA	Kaitlin Swann
35	FW	USA	Caroline Staubach
99	GK	USA	Riley Franklin

== Awards ==
Player	Award	Season
Randy Waldrum	Big 12 Coach of the Year	1998
Dana Larsen	Big 12 Scholar-Athlete of the Year	2012
Lauren Piercy	Big 12 Freshman of the Year	2015

Player	Award	Season
Precious Akanyirige	Big 12 Scholar-Athlete of the Year	2017
Paul Jobson	Big 12 Coach of the Year	2018
Tyler Isgrig	Big 12 Midfielder of the Year	2025

=== All-Big 12 Honors ===
Player	First team All-Big 12
Courtney Saunders	1997
Dawn Greathouse	1998
Courtney Saunders	1998
Tamura Crawley	1999
Courtney Saunders	1999
Dawn Greathouse	2000
Ashley Noah	2006
Bri Campos	2013
Julie James	2016
Precious Akanyrige	2017
Julie James	2017
Aline De Lima	2017
Sarah King	2018
Julie James	2018
Azul Alvarez	2025
Tyler Isgrig	2025

Player	Second team All-Big 12
Molly Cameron	1996
Meghan Crona	1996
Courtney Saunders	1996
Britt Talley	1996
Molly Cameron	1997
Nikki Hales	1998
Julie Larson	1998
Juli Goin	1999
Dawn Greathouse	1999
Molly Cameron	2000
Tamura Crawley	2000
Tamura Crawley	2001
Candace Reilly	2001
Tamura Crawley	2002
Tiffany Boshers	2003
Ashley Noah	2007
Carlie Davis	2012
Dana Larsen	2012
Kat Ludlow	2012
Bri Campos	2014
Lauren Piercy	2015
Lauren Piercy	2016
Jennifer Wandt	2018
Camryn Wendlandt	2018
Raegan Padgett	2019
Jennifer Wandt	2020
Kayley Ables	2020
Taylor Moon	2020
Kayley Ables	2021
Taylor Moon	2021
Tyler Isgrig	2024
Hallie Augustyn	2025
Callie Conrad	2025

Note

- ‡ indicates player was Big 12 Player of the Year
- † indicates player was Big 12 Freshman of the Year

All-Big 12 All-Freshman Honors

Player	Big 12 All-Freshman Team
Melissa Humke	2000
Anna Schuch	2004
Megan Sherrell	2004
Courtney Seelhorst	2008
Bri Campos	2012
Katie Daigle	2012
Precious Akanyirige	2014
Amanda Hoglund	2015
Julie James	2015
Sarah King	2015
Lauren Piercy †	2015
Raegan Padgett	2016
Jennifer Wandt	2017
Taylor Moon	2018
Kayley Ables	2018
Elizabeth Kooiman	2019
Mackenzie Anthony	2020
Gabby Mueller	2020
Chloe Japic	2020
Callie Conrad	2023
Olivia Hess	2025

== Individual Records ==
Career Goals
Player	Years	Goals
Courtney Saunders	1996–99	69
Molly Cameron	1996–98, 2000	67
Nikki Hales	1996–99	35
Lisa Sliwinski	2009–12	30
Dana Larsen	2009-12	29

Season Goals
Player	Year	Goals
Molly Cameron	1996	32
Courtney Saunders	1996	18
Courtney Saunders	1999	18
Courtney Saunders	1997	17
Courtney Saunders	1998	16

Career Assists
Player	Years	Assists
Courtney Saunders	1996–99	34
Nikki Hales	1996–99	26
Molly Cameron	1996-98, 2000	26
Tyler Isgrig	2023–25	25
Sarah King	2015–18	20

Season Assists
Player	Year	Assists
Courtney Saunders	1996	12
Molly Cameron	1996	11
Molly Cameron	1997	10
Sarah King	2015	10
Nikki Hales	1996	9
Dana Larsen	2012	9
Tyler Isgrig	2023	9

Career Points
Player	Years	Points
Courtney Saunders	1996–99	172
Molly Cameron	1996–98, 2000	160
Nikki Hales	1996–99	96
Dana Larsen	2009-12	75
Lisa Sliwinski	2009–12	73

Season Points
Player	Year	Points
Molly Cameron	1996	75
Courtney Saunders	1996	48
Courtney Saunders	1999	44
Courtney Saunders	1997	41
Courtney Saunders	1998	39

Career Saves
Player	Years	Saves
Ashley Noah	2004–07	440
Dawn Greathouse	1997–00	397
Jennifer Wandt	2017–21	327
Azul Alvarez	2024-Present	198
Michelle Kloss	2010, 2012–14	172

Season Saves
Player	Year	Saves
Dawn Greathouse	2000	133
Ashley Noah	2005	125
Amanda Banar	1996	114
Ashley Noah	2006	112
Dawn Greathouse	1999	108
