= Iowa State Cyclones women's soccer =

American college soccer team

- Founded: 1996; 30 years ago
- University: Iowa State University
- Athletic director: Jamie Pollard
- Head coach: Matt Fannon (7th season)
- Conference: Big 12
- Location: Ames, Iowa, US
- Stadium: Cyclone Sports Complex (capacity: 1,500)
- Nickname: Cyclones
- Colors: Cardinal and gold
Home	Away

NCAA tournament appearances
- 2005

The Iowa State Cyclones women's soccer team represents Iowa State University (ISU) and competes in the Big 12 Conference of NCAA Division I. The team is coached by Matt Fannon, who enters his seventh season at Iowa State in 2026. The Cyclones host their home games at the Cyclone Sports Complex on Iowa State's campus.

== History ==
Iowa State put together a varsity squad then they joined the Big 12 in 1996. Their best season yet has been the 2005 squad. Head Coach Rebecca Hornhacher earned Big 12 Coach of the Year honors en route to their first and only invitation to the NCAA Tournament.

The current Head Coach is Matt Fannon, who joined Iowa State from Bowling Green in December 2019.

== Facilities ==
The $13 million Cyclone Sports Complex, the home of Iowa State track and field, soccer, and softball, opened in the fall of 2012.

The facility brings numerous new amenities for the Cyclones and their fans. On-site restrooms, a concession stand, home and away locker rooms, officials' locker rooms, team meeting rooms, an athletic training room, a press box, bleachers, and a scoreboard are among the new features that make it a state-of-the-art facility. The soccer facility has a seating capacity of 1,500.

== Players ==
=== Current roster ===
As of August 2026

Note: Flags indicate national team as defined under FIFA eligibility rules; some limited exceptions apply. Players may hold more than one non-FIFA nationality.

No.	Pos.	Nation	Player
00	GK	USA	Eme McClenahan
0	GK	USA	Ella Moersch
1	GK	USA	Sara Gavagan
2	DF	USA	Breezie Brewer
3	MF	USA	Mia Sowders
4	DF	USA	Ryan Weber
5	FW	USA	Megan Walters
6	FW	USA	Ava Hancock
7	DF	USA	Makenna Marshall
8	DF	USA	Maia Soulis
9	MF	USA	Grace Luedde
10	MF	USA	Izabella Tejeda
11	DF	USA	Cassidy Corcione
12	MF	USA	Lucy Froitzheim

No.	Pos.	Nation	Player
13	FW	USA	Morgan Struttmann
14	MF	USA	Izzy Kapanke
15	FW	USA	Giovanna Hansen
17	MF	USA	Morgan Goodman
18	MF	USA	Alaina Villa
19	MF	USA	Allison Charleston
20	MF	USA	Regan John
21	MF	USA	Aubrey Crawford
22	DF	USA	Danica Lunceford
23	DF	USA	Erin Hopewell
24	DF	USA	Sydney Walters
30	FW	USA	Sophie Forrester
33	DF	USA	Morgan Duke

== Awards ==
Player	Award	Season
Erica Florez	Big 12 Rookie of the Year	1998
Katie Antongiovanni	Big 12 Rookie of the Year	1999

Coach	Award	Season
Cathy Klein (co-coach)	Big 12 Coach of the Year	1997
Rebecca Hornbacher	Big 12 Coach of the Year	2005

All-Big 12 First Team
Year	Name	Pos.
2000	Katie Antongiovanni	MF
2015	Koree Willer	FW

All-Big 12 Second Team
Year	Name	Pos.
1997	Barb Lavergne	DF
1997	Lindsey Rector	MF
1997	Jo Hinks	FW
1998	Erica Florez	FW
1999	Katie Antongiovanni	MF
1999	Erica Florez	FW
2000	Nicole Wilcox	FW
2005	Joanna Haig	GK
2007	Elise Reid	MF
2012	Jennifer Dominguez	FW
2013	Emily Goldstein	MF

== Individual records ==
Career Goals
Player	Years	Goals
Jo Hinks	1996–97	31
Jennifer Dominguez	2010–13	25
Koree Willer	2013–16	22
Lindsey Rector	1996–99	20
Amy Flores	2002-05	20

Season Goals
Player	Year	Goals
Jo Hinks	1997	18
Jennifer Dominguez	2012	14
Jo Hinks	1996	13
Erica Florez	1998	10
Koree Willer	2014	10

Career Assists
Player	Years	Assists
Krista Odenwald	1997–00	23
Lindsey Rector	1996–99	23
Kristina Baumann	2002-05	16
Emily Goldstein	2010–13	15
Mira Emma	2019–23	13
Koree Willer	2013–16	13
Jordan Bishop	2007–10	13

Season Assists
Player	Year	Assists
Lindsey Rector	1997	14
Jo Hinks	1997	10
Jun Shen	1997	10
Krista Odenwald	1999	8
Barb Lavergne	1997	8
Krista Odenwald	1997	8

Career Points
Player	Years	Points
Jo Hinks	1996–97	72
Lindsey Rector	1996–99	63
Jennifer Dominguez	2010–13	60
Koree Wille	2013-16	57
Emily Goldstein	2010–13	51

Season Points
Player	Year	Points
Jo Hinks	1997	46
Lindsey Rector	1997	30
Jun Shen	1997	28
Jennifer Dominguez	2012	28
Jo Hinks	1996	26

Career Saves
Player	Years	Saves
Ann Gleason	2006–09	403
Maddie Jobe	2010–13	319
Lynley Hilligoss	1998–99	241
Beth Chapman	2000-03	240
Jordan Silkowitz	2020–22	234

Season Saves
Player	Year	Saves
Lynley Hilligoss	1998	144
Ann Gleason	2006	119
Ann Gleason	2007	114
Joanna Haig	2005	111
Lauren Muser	1996	104

== Results by season ==
Record
Big 12 (1996–Present)
Year	Head Coach	Overall Record	Conference Record	Conference Standing	Postseason
1996	Cathy Klein	8–12	0–9	10th	–
1997	Cathy Klein	12–9	4–6	6th	–
1998	Cathy Klein	10–8–1	5–5	6th	–
1999	Cathy Klein	11–8–1	4–6	7th	–
2000	Stephanie Gabbert	7–10–2	3–6–1	9th	–
2001	Stephanie Gabbert	5–11–2	3–5–2	8th	–
2002	Rebecca Hornbacher	7–11–1	4–6	7th	–
2003	Rebecca Hornbacher	5–10–4	2–6–2	10th	–
2004	Rebecca Hornbacher	8–12	4–6	8th	–
2005	Rebecca Hornbacher	11–7–3	6–3–1	3rd	NCAA First Round
2006	Rebecca Hornbacher	6–14	2–8	11th	–
2007	Rebecca Hornbacher	8–6–4	4–4–1	8th	–
2008	Wendy Dillinger	5–12–2	0–8–2	11th	–
2009	Wendy Dillinger	7–9–4	2–7	11th	–
2010	Wendy Dillinger	8–10–2	3–7	10th	–
2011	Wendy Dillinger	9–9–1	2–6	9th	–
2012	Wendy Dillinger	10–10	1–7	9th	–
2013	Wendy Dillinger	9–9–1	3–4	4th	–
2014	Tony Minatta	7–11	1–7	9th	–
2015	Tony Minatta	6–12	0–8	9th	–
2016	Tony Minatta	10–8–1	3–4–1	5th	–
2017	Tony Minatta	3-12-3	1-6-2	9th	–
2018	Tony Minatta	4-14-2	2-6-1	8th	–
2019	Tony Minatta	3-15-0	0-9-0	10th	–
2020	Matt Fannon	3-6-4	2-6-1	9th	–
2021	Matt Fannon	5-11-1	2-6-0	8th	–
2022	Matt Fannon	3-10-4	0-7-2	10th	–
2023	Matt Fannon	6-11-1	3-7-0	11th	–
2024	Matt Fannon	3-9-6	1-5-4	14th	–
2025	Matt Fannon	4-9-4	1-8-2	15th	–
Total	–	203–305–56 (.410)	69–190–24 (.286)	–	1 Postseason appearance

== Coaches ==
=== Current staff ===
Pos.	Name
Head coach	Matt Fannon
Assistant coach	Jaycie Ackerman
Assistant coach	Seth Junion
Soccer Development Coach	Matt Tennyson
