= 2022 Big 12 Conference women's soccer tournament =

Collegiate women's soccer tournament

- Classification: Division I
- Teams: 8
- Matches: 7
- Attendance: 4,632
- Site: Round Rock Multipurpose Complex; Round Rock, Texas
- Champions: West Virginia (5th title)
- Winning coach: Nikki Izzo-Brown (5th title)
- MVP: Lauren Segalla (Offensive); Jordan Brewster (Defensive) (West Virginia)
- Broadcast: ESPN+ (Quarterfinals & Semifinals); ESPNU (Final)

2022 Big 12 Conference women's soccer standings
| | Conf. | | | | | | Overall |
| Team | W | | L | | T | PCT | W | | L | | T | PCT |
|---|---|---|---|---|---|---|---|---|---|---|---|---|
| No. 17 Texas ‍†‍‍^{y} | 7 | – | 0 | – | 2 | .889 | 15 | – | 3 | – | 4 | .773 |
| No. 10 TCU ‍‍‍^{y} | 5 | – | 1 | – | 3 | .722 | 14 | – | 5 | – | 5 | .688 |
| Texas Tech ‍‍‍ | 5 | – | 1 | – | 3 | .722 | 9 | – | 4 | – | 6 | .632 |
| West Virginia ‍‍‡‍^{y} | 4 | – | 1 | – | 4 | .667 | 11 | – | 5 | – | 7 | .630 |
| Oklahoma St. ‍‍‍ | 4 | – | 2 | – | 3 | .611 | 11 | – | 4 | – | 4 | .684 |
| Oklahoma ‍‍‍ | 3 | – | 5 | – | 1 | .389 | 9 | – | 8 | – | 3 | .525 |
| Kansas ‍‍‍ | 2 | – | 5 | – | 2 | .333 | 9 | – | 9 | – | 2 | .500 |
| Kansas State ‍‍‍ | 2 | – | 5 | – | 2 | .333 | 6 | – | 10 | – | 3 | .395 |
| Baylor ‍‍‍ | 2 | – | 7 | – | 0 | .222 | 4 | – | 11 | – | 2 | .294 |
| Iowa St. ‍‍‍ | 0 | – | 7 | – | 2 | .111 | 3 | – | 10 | – | 4 | .294 |
† – Conference champion ‡ – 2022 Big 12 Tournament champion y – Invited to the NCAA Tournament; As of December 6, 2022; Rankings from United Soccer Coaches Poll; Source: The Big 12 Conference

The 2022 Big 12 Conference women's soccer tournament was the postseason women's soccer tournament for the Big 12 Conference held from October 30 to November 6, 2022. The 7-match tournament was held at the Round Rock Multipurpose Complex in Round Rock, Texas. The 8-team single-elimination tournament consisted of three rounds based on seeding from regular season conference play. The TCU Horned Frogs were the defending champions from 2021.

West Virginia won the title by defeating defending champion TCU 1–0 in the final. This was the fifth title in school history for West Virginia and head coach Nikki Izzo-Brown. As tournament champions, West Virginia earned the Big 12's automatic berth into the 2022 NCAA Division I Women's Soccer Tournament.

== Seeding ==
The top eight teams in regular season play qualified for the tournament. There were two tiebreakers required in the seeding process. The first tiebreaker was for the second and third seed as both TCU and Texas Tech finished with 5–1–3 regular season conference records. The two teams played to a 0–0 draw on October 27, 2022, so the tiebreaker of conference goal difference was used. TCU finished with a goal difference of +9 and Texas Tech had a goal difference of +6. Therefore, TCU was the second seed and Texas Tech was the third seed. Rivals Kansas and Kansas State finished tied for seventh place with 2–5–2 records after the regular season. The two teams played to a 1–1 draw on October 21, 2022, so the conference goal difference tiebreaker was used again. Kansas earned the seventh seed as they finished with a -3 goal difference, while Kansas State was the eighth seed, finishing with a -6 goal difference.

| Seed | School | Conference Record | Points |
|---|---|---|---|
| 1 | Texas | 7–0–2 | 23 |
| 2 | TCU | 5–1–3 | 18 |
| 3 | Texas Tech | 5–1–3 | 18 |
| 4 | West Virginia | 4–1–4 | 16 |
| 5 | Oklahoma State | 4–2–3 | 15 |
| 6 | Oklahoma | 3–5–1 | 10 |
| 7 | Kansas | 2–5–2 | 8 |
| 8 | Kansas State | 2–5–2 | 8 |

== Bracket ==
Quarterfinals; Sunday, Oct. 30
1 | Texas | 4
8 | Kansas State | 0
4 | West Virginia | 2
5 | Oklahoma State | 1
2 | TCU | 5
7 | Kansas | 1
3 | Texas Tech | 0
6 | Oklahoma | 1

Semifinals; Thursday, Nov. 3
1 | Texas | 0
4 | West Virginia | 1
2 | TCU | 3
6 | Oklahoma | 0

Final; Sunday, Nov. 6
4 | West Virginia | 1
2 | TCU | 0

== Schedule ==
=== Quarterfinals ===
| October 30, 2022 | #1 Texas | 4–0 | #8 Kansas State | Round Rock, TX |
| 11:30 a.m. | Holly Ward 26'; Emily Jane Cox 28'; Alexis Missimo 34'; Trinity Byars (yellow card) 66'; Trinity Byars 70' | Report | (yellow card) 16' Marisa Weichel | Stadium: Round Rock Multipurpose Complex; Attendance: 645; Referee: Richonne Clark; Assistant referees: Albert Escovar; Gerson López; Fourth official: Tim Debysingh |

| October 30, 2022 | #4 West Virginia | 2–1 | #5 Oklahoma State | Round Rock, TX |
| 2:00 p.m. | Lauren Segalla 65'; Jordan Brewster 84' | Report | 85' Olyvia Dowell | Stadium: Round Rock Multipurpose Complex; Attendance: 309; Referee: Corey Rockwell; Assistant referees: Kayla Polonsky; William Torres; Fourth official: Esteban Rosano |

| October 30, 2022 | #2 TCU | 5–1 | #7 Kansas | Round Rock, TX |
| 5:30 p.m. | Sarah Melcher 9', 22'; Kennedy Clountz 28'; Messiah Bright 51'; Lauren Memoly (yellow card) 75'; Sarah Melcher (yellow card) 80'; Dana Reed 88' | Report | (yellow card) 21' Mackenzie Boeve; (yellow card) 67' Rylan Childers; 89' Rylan Childers | Stadium: Round Rock Multipurpose Complex; Attendance: 335; Referee: Sergio Gonzalez; Assistant referees: Albert Escovar; Gerson López; Fourth official: Mark Kadlecik |

| October 30, 2022 | #3 Texas Tech | 0–1 | #6 Oklahoma | Round Rock, TX |
| 8:00 p.m. | Team (yellow card) 80' | Report | (yellow card) 77' Muriel Kroflin; (yellow card) 83' Emma Hawkins; 90' Michelle Pak | Stadium: Round Rock Multipurpose Complex; Attendance: 206; Referee: Mark Kadlecik; Assistant referees: Kayla Polonsky; William Torres; Fourth official: Corey Rockwell |

=== Semifinals ===
| November 3, 2022 | #1 Texas | 0–1 | #4 West Virginia | Round Rock, TX |
| 4:30 p.m. | Lauren Lapomarda (yellow card) 77' | Report | (yellow card) 39' Isabel Loza; 42' Lauren Segalla; (yellow card) 62' Julianne Vallerand | Stadium: Round Rock Multipurpose Complex; Attendance: 934; Referee: Esteban Rosano; Assistant referees: Tiffani Turpin; William Torres; Fourth official: Fev Demirhan |

| November 3, 2022 | #2 TCU | 3–0 | #6 Oklahoma | Round Rock, TX |
| 7:00 p.m. | Gracie Brian 6'; Seven Castain 40'; Messiah Bright 53' | Report | (yellow card) 52' Elizabeth Rapp; (yellow card) 56' Emma Hawkins | Stadium: Round Rock Multipurpose Complex; Attendance: 488; Referee: Richonne Clark; Assistant referees: Fev Demirhan; Gerson Lopez; Fourth official: Esteban Rosano |

=== Final ===
| November 6, 2022 | #2 TCU | 0–1 (a.e.t.) | #4 West Virginia | Round Rock, TX |
| 1:00 p.m. | | Report | 93' Jordan Brewster; (yellow card) 110' Mackenzie Aunkst | Stadium: Round Rock Multipurpose Complex; Attendance: 1,715; Referee: Shane Butler; Assistant referees: Bernardo van Steenberghe; Janae Thompson; Fourth official: Richonne Clark |

== Statistics ==
=== Goalscorers ===
There were 19 goals scored in 7 matches, for an average of 2.71 goals per match (as of November 6, 2022).

2 goals

- Jordan Brewster – West Virginia
- Messiah Bright – TCU
- Sarah Melcher – TCU
- Lauren Segalla – West Virginia

1 goal

- Gracie Brian – TCU
- Trinity Byars – Texas
- Seven Castain – TCU
- Rylan Childers – Kansas
- Kennedy Clountz – TCU
- Emily Jane Cox – Texas
- Olyvia Dowell – Oklahoma State
- Alexis Missimo – Texas
- Michelle Pak – Oklahoma
- Dana Reed – TCU
- Holly Ward – Texas

== All-Tournament team ==
| Position | Player | Team |
|---|---|---|
| GK | Kayza Massey | West Virginia |
| DF | Chaylyn Hubbard | TCU |
| DF | Emily Jane Cox | Texas |
| DF | Jordan Brewster^ | West Virginia |
| MF | Gracie Brian | TCU |
| MF | Oli Peña | TCU |
| MF | Alexis Missimo | Texas |
| MF | AJ Rodriguez | West Virginia |
| MF | Dilary Heredia-Beltrán | West Virginia |
| FW | Camryn Lancaster | TCU |
| FW | Messiah Bright | TCU |
| FW | Trinity Byars | Texas |
| FW | Lauren Segalla* | West Virginia |

* Offensive MVP
^ Defensive MVP
