= 2025 North Carolina Courage season =

Professional women's soccer club season

North Carolina Courage
2025 season
- Managing Owner: Steve Malik
- Club President: Francie Gottsegen
- Head Coach: Nathan Thackeray (acting)
- Stadium: First Horizon Stadium at WakeMed Soccer Park; Cary, North Carolina (Capacity: 10,000)
- NWSL Regular Season: 9th
- Top goalscorer: Manaka Matsukubo (11)
- Highest home attendance: 11,170 (November 2 vs GFC)
- Lowest home attendance: 6,235 (Apr 26 vs KC)
- Average home league attendance: 7,684
Home colors	Away colors
- All statistics correct as of November 2, 2025.

The 2025 North Carolina Courage season was the team's ninth season as a professional women's soccer team. The Courage played in the National Women's Soccer League (NWSL), the top tier of women's soccer in the United States. They reached the mid-season break just outside of a playoff spot in ninth place, tied on points with eighth-place Gotham FC with 18, but losing the first tiebreaker, goal differential, with a -2 GD compared to Gotham's +5 GD. They finished the season one point out of the playoffs in ninth place.

== Background ==
In the 2024 National Women's Soccer League season, the Courage were never outside of a playoff spot during the season, eventually settling into 5th place for the final 10 weeks of the regular season, before falling to 4th-seeded Kansas City Current in the first round of the playoffs. The Courage also advanced to the knockout rounds of the NWSL x Liga MX Femenil Summer Cup.

=== Coaching changes ===
On August 6, 2025, at 7:45 p.m. EDT, the club posted a statement on instagram saying "The North Carolina Courage have terminated the contract of Head Coach Sean Nahas, effective immediately. The North Carolina Courage remain focused on the continued development of the team and maintaining a professional, competitive environment for players, staff, and supporters." No interim head coach was named.

In a press conference at 11 a.m. on August 7, the club named Nathan Thackeray as Acting Head Coach. When asked about the coaching search, Chief Soccer Officer Ceri Bowley said "We'll take stock after tomorrow's game."

== Team ==
=== Squad ===
As of November 2, 2025.

No.	Pos.	Nation	Player
1	GK	USA	Casey Murphy
2	MF	USA	Ashley Sanchez
3	DF	USA	Kaleigh Kurtz
4	DF	USA	Natalie Jacobs
8	MF	USA	Brianna Pinto
9	FW	USA	Olivia Wingate
10	MF	IRL	Denise O'Sullivan
11	DF	GER	Feli Rauch
12	DF	USA	Natalia Staude
13	DF	USA	Ryan Williams
14	FW	USA	Tyler Lussi
16	MF	USA	Riley Jackson
17	MF	USA	Dani Weatherholt
18	DF	CAN	Sydney Collins
20	MF	JPN	Shinomi Koyama
22	FW	AUS	Cortnee Vine
24	DF	CAN	Brooklyn Courtnall
25	MF	USA	Meredith Speck
27	DF	USA	Maycee Bell
30	FW	USA	Hannah Betfort
33	DF	AUS	Charlotte McLean
34	MF	JPN	Manaka Matsukubo
44	GK	USA	Marisa Jordan
77	FW	BRA	Aline Gomes Amaro
80	MF	USA	Oli Peña
99	GK	USA	Katie Cappelletti
-	DF	USA	Sydney Schmidt

=== Staff ===
As of August 7, 2025.

Executive
Chairman	Steve Malik
President	Francie Gottsegen
Chief Operating Officer	Ralph Vuono
Chief Soccer Officer and Sporting Director	Ceri Bowley
Executive Vice President, Special Projects	Pete Sciandra
Coaching
Head Coach	(England) Nathan Thackeray (acting)
Assistant Coach	(England) Nathan Thackeray
Assistant Coach	(England) Emma Thomson
Assistant Coach	(United States) Victoria Boardman
Assistant General Manager	(United States) Bobby Hammond

== Competitions ==
Win Tie Loss

=== Friendlies ===
July 9, 2025	North Carolina Courage	0-0	Tigres UANL Femenil	Cary, North Carolina
7:00 p.m. EDT (UTC-5)		Report		Stadium: First Horizon Stadium
Note: Match was suspended in the 77' due to heavy rain.

July 25, 2025	North Carolina Courage	4-0	Chivas de Guadalajara Femenil	Cary, North Carolina
7:30 p.m. Eastern Daylight Time (UTC-5)	Lussi 4'; Sanchez 13'; Courtnall 15'; Gomes 76'	Report		Stadium: First Horizon Stadium

=== Regular season ===
March 15, 2025 1	Racing Louisville FC	1–1	North Carolina Courage	Louisville, Kentucky
5:00 p.m. EDT (UTC-5)	Sears 13'	Report	Lussi (yellow card) 63'; Jackson 69'	Stadium: Lynn Family Stadium; Attendance: 2,847; Referee: Adorae Monroy

March 25, 2025 2	North Carolina Courage	1–2	Seattle Reign FC	Cary, North Carolina
7:00 p.m. EDT (UTC-5)	Gomes 59'	Report	Fishlock 35'; Bugg 56'	Stadium: First Horizon Stadium; Attendance: 8,158; Referee: Elvis Osmanovic

March 29, 2025 3	Portland Thorns FC	0–0	North Carolina Courage	Portland, Oregon
10:00 p.m. EDT (UTC-5)	Castellanos (yellow card) 51'	Report		Stadium: Providence Park; Attendance: 15,967; Referee: Elton Garcia

April 13, 2025 4	NJ/NY Gotham FC	3–1	North Carolina Courage	Harrison, New Jersey
4:00 p.m. EDT (UTC-5)	Stevens (yellow card) 26'; Esther 43', 45+4'; Reale 46'	Report	Jackson (yellow card) 79'; Pinto 90+4'	Stadium: Sports Illustrated Stadium; Attendance: 7,115; Referee: Joshua Encarnación

April 19, 2025 5	North Carolina Courage	0–1	Bay FC	Cary, North Carolina
7:00 p.m. EDT (UTC-5)	Rauch (yellow card) 53'; Matsukubo (yellow card) 90+1'; Williams (yellow card) 90+5'	Report	Pickett 33'; Dydasco (yellow card) 87'	Stadium: First Horizon Stadium; Attendance: 7,049; Referee: Iryna Petrunok

April 26, 2025 6	North Carolina Courage	3–2	Kansas City Current	Cary, North Carolina
7:00 p.m. EDT (UTC-5)	Shaw (yellow card) 30'; Bell (yellow card) 34'; Williams 52'; Kurtz 90'; Sanchez 90+3'	Report	Hopkins 39'; Zaneratto 57'; Mace (yellow card) 64'	Stadium: First Horizon Stadium; Attendance: 6,235; Referee: Shawn Tehini

May 3, 2025 7	Utah Royals	0–2	North Carolina Courage	Sandy, Utah
10:00 p.m. EDT (UTC-5)	Cluff (yellow card) 90+1'	Report	Sanchez 12'; Del Fava 43' (o.g.); Koyama (yellow card) 54'	Stadium: America First Field; Attendance: 7,371; Referee: Laura Rodriguez

May 10, 2025 8	North Carolina Courage	1–1	Orlando Pride	Cary, North Carolina
7:30 p.m. Eastern Daylight Time (UTC-5)	Rauch 27'; Matsukubo (yellow card) 60'	Report	Abello (yellow card) 33'; Chilufya 90+3'	Stadium: First Horizon Stadium; Attendance: 9,366; Referee: Brad Jensen

May 17, 2025 9	North Carolina Courage	2–0	Chicago Stars FC	Cary, North Carolina
5:00 p.m. EDT (UTC-5)	Jackson (yellow card) 29'; Matsukubo 51', 77'	Report	Onwualu (yellow card) 67'; Malham (yellow card) 90+2'	Stadium: First Horizon Stadium; Attendance: 8,592; Referee: Jaclyn Metz

May 25, 2025 10	San Diego Wave FC	5–2	North Carolina Courage	San Diego, California
10:00 p.m. EDT (UTC-5)	Morroni 25'; Leon 40', 60'; McNabb 54'; Sánchez 90+5'	Report	Rauch 12'; O'Sullivan (yellow card) 27'; Matsukubo 51'	Stadium: Snapdragon Stadium; Attendance: 12,760; Referee: Elijio Arreguin

June 8, 2025 11	Washington Spirit	3–1	North Carolina Courage	Washington, D.C.
4:00 p.m. EDT (UTC-5)	Brown 24'; Ratcliffe 27'; Monday 58'	Report	Matsukubo 32'	Stadium: Audi Field; Attendance: 17,625; Referee: Brandon Stevis

June 14, 2025 12	Angel City FC	1–2	North Carolina Courage	Los Angeles, California
10:00 p.m. EDT (UTC-5)	Tiernan 11'	Report	Vine 1'; Matsukubo (yellow card) 45+3'; Betfort (yellow card) 89'; Pinto 90+5'	Stadium: BMO Stadium; Attendance: 14,933; Referee: Nabil Bensalah

June 21, 2025 13	North Carolina Courage	2–1	Houston Dash	Cary, North Carolina
7:30 p.m. EDT (UTC-5)	Shaw 71'; Betfort 81' (yellow card) 90+10'	Report	Patterson 1'; Puntigam (yellow card) 45' (yellow-red card) 69'; Olivieri (yellow card) 67'	Stadium: First Horizon Stadium; Attendance: 6,642; Referee: Calin Radosav

August 2, 2025 14	North Carolina Courage	0–0	San Diego Wave FC	Cary, North Carolina
7:30 p.m. EDT (UTC-5)	O'Sullivan (yellow card) 15'	Report	Ascanio (yellow card) 57'	Stadium: First Horizon Stadium; Attendance: 7,109; Referee: Elvis Osmanovic

August 8, 2025 15	Houston Dash	2–1	North Carolina Courage	Houston, Texas
8:00 p.m. EDT (UTC-5)	Van Zanten 39' (Graham); Bright (yellow card) 77'; Schmidt 90+5'	Report	Jackson 32' (pen.); Kurtz (yellow card) 72'	Stadium: Shell Energy Stadium; Attendance: 5,409; Referee: Shawn Tehini

August 16, 2025 16	North Carolina Courage	1–1	Portland Thorns FC	Cary, North Carolina
7:30 pm EDT (UTC-5)	Lussi (yellow card) 26' (goal) 70'	Report	Moultrie 44'; Tordin (yellow card) 79'	Stadium: First Horizon Stadium; Attendance: 7,122; Referee: Natalie Simon

August 22, 2025 17	Chicago Stars FC	3–3	North Carolina Courage	Bridgeview, Illinois
7:00 p.m. CDT (UTC-6)	López (yellow card) 25'; Nesbeth (yellow card) 44'; Franklin (yellow card) 67'; Ludmila 76', 81', 86'	Report	Manaka Matsukubo (yellow card) 43' (goal) 49'; Lussi 62'; Shaw 83'	Stadium: SeatGeek Stadium; Attendance: 2,473; Referee: Luis Arroyo

August 30, 2025 18	Kansas City Current	2–0	North Carolina Courage	Kansas City, Missouri
6:30 p.m. CDT (UTC-6)	Rodriguez 31'; LaBonta 41' (pen.) (yellow card) 71'; Sentnor (yellow card) 44'	Report		Stadium: CPKC Stadium; Attendance: 11,500; Referee: Joshua Encarnación

September 6, 2025 19	North Carolina Courage	1–1	Utah Royals	Cary, North Carolina
5:30 pm MDT (UTC-7)	Shaw (yellow card) 21' (goal) 89' (pen.)	Report	Monaghan (yellow card) 87' (goal) 90+4'	Stadium: First Horizon Stadium; Attendance: 6,358; Referee: Abdou Ndiaye

September 13, 2025 20	North Carolina Courage	2–1	Angel City FC	Cary, North Carolina
9:30 a.m. PDT (UTC-7)	Matsukubo 6'; Pinto 19'; Lussi (yellow card) 45+4'; Jackson (yellow card) 86'	Report	Jónsdóttir 88'	Stadium: First Horizon Stadium; Attendance: 6,378; Referee: Alex Billeter

September 19, 2025 21	Orlando Pride	0–1	North Carolina Courage	Orlando, Florida
7:30 p.m. EDT (UTC-5)	Angelina (yellow card) 19'	Report	Weatherholt (yellow card) 28'; Koyama 89'	Stadium: Inter&Co Stadium; Attendance: 20,575; Referee: Matthew Thompson

September 28, 2025 22	Seattle Reign FC	2–1	North Carolina Courage	Seattle, Washington
8:00 p.m. Eastern Daylight Time (UTC-5)	Menti (yellow card) 20'; Williams 71' (o.g.); Dahlien 80' (Menti); Barnes (yellow card) 90+9'	Report	Betfort 57' (Williams)	Stadium: Lumen Field; Attendance: 8,563; Referee: Elijio Arreguin

October 4, 2025 23	North Carolina Courage	1–3	Racing Louisville FC	Cary, North Carolina
7:30 p.m. EDT (UTC-5)	Matsukubo 55' (Jackson)	Report	Flint (yellow card) 7'; Sears 49', 79' (Balcer); Fischer 59' (O'Kane) (yellow card) 60'	Stadium: First Horizon Stadium; Attendance: 7,218; Referee: Jeremy Scheer

October 11, 2025 24	North Carolina Courage	1–1	Washington Spirit	Cary, North Carolina
7:30 p.m. EDT (UTC-5)		Report	Rodman 53' (Hershfelt); Abiodun 86' (Koyama)	Stadium: First Horizon Stadium; Attendance: 8,498; Referee: Servando Berna Rico

October 17, 2025 25	Bay FC	1–4	North Carolina Courage	San Jose, California
7:00 p.m. PDT (UTC-8)	Shepherd (yellow card) 24'; Malonson (yellow card) 34'; Hocking 45+3' (Malonson)	Report	Matsukubo 3' (Sanchez), 8' (Speck), 80'; Koyama 74' (Lussi)	Stadium: PayPal Park; Attendance: 13,519; Referee: Mark Verso

November 2, 2025 26	North Carolina Courage	3–2	NJ/NY Gotham FC	Cary, North Carolina
5:15 p.m EDT (UTC-5)	Speck 14' (Linnehan); Matsukubo 16'; Carter 51' (o.g.)	Report	Stengel (yellow card) 77'; Lavelle 87' (pen.); Portilho 90+5' (Stengel)	Stadium: First Horizon Stadium; Attendance: 11,170; Referee: Abdou Ndiaye

==== Regular season standings ====
Pos	Team	Pld	W	D	L	GF	GA	GD	Pts	Qualification
1	Kansas City Current (S)	26	21	2	3	49	13	+36	65	Playoffs and CONCACAF W Champions Cup
2	Washington Spirit	26	12	8	6	42	33	+9	44	Playoffs and CONCACAF W Champions Cup
3	Portland Thorns FC	26	11	7	8	36	29	+7	40	Playoffs
4	Orlando Pride	26	11	7	8	33	27	+6	40	Playoffs
5	Seattle Reign FC	26	10	9	7	32	29	+3	39	Playoffs
6	San Diego Wave FC	26	10	7	9	41	34	+7	37	Playoffs
7	Racing Louisville FC	26	10	7	9	35	38	−3	37	Playoffs
8	Gotham FC (C)	26	9	9	8	35	25	+10	36	Playoffs and CONCACAF W Champions Cup
9	North Carolina Courage	26	9	8	9	37	39	−2	35	
10	Houston Dash	26	8	6	12	27	39	−12	30	
11	Angel City FC	26	7	6	13	31	41	−10	27	
12	Utah Royals	26	6	7	13	28	42	−14	25	
13	Bay FC	26	4	8	14	26	41	−15	20	
14	Chicago Stars FC	26	3	11	12	32	54	−22	20	

Source: NWSL
Rules for classification: 1) points; 2) total goal difference; 3) total wins; 4) total goals scored; 5) head-to-head points; 6) head-to-head goals scored; 7) fewest disciplinary points; 8) coin toss (if 2 clubs tied) or drawing of lots (if ≥3 clubs tied).
(C) Champions; (S) NWSL Shield

==== Results summary ====
Overall								Home						Away					
Pld	Pts	W	L	T	GF	GA	GD	W	L	T	GF	GA	GD	W	L	T	GF	GA	GD
26	35	9	9	8	37	39	−2	5	3	5	18	16	+2	4	6	3	19	23	−4

Last updated: November 2, 2025
Source: NWSLsoccer.com
Pld = Matches played; Pts = Points; W = Matches won; T = Matches tied; L = Matches lost; GF = Goals for; GA = Goals against; GD = Goal difference

==== Results by matchday ====
Round	1	2	3	4	5	6	7	8	9	10	11	12	13	14	15	16	17	18	19	20	21	22	23	24	25	26
Stadium	A	H	A	A	H	H	A	H	H	A	A	A	H	H	A	H	A	A	H	H	A	A	H	H	A	H
Result	D	L	D	L	L	W	W	D	W	L	L	W	W	D	L	D	D	L	D	W	W	L	L	D	W	W
Position (Note: NC's position at the end of the day in which their match was played.)	5	10	10	13	14	11	9	11	9	10	11	11	9	9	9	9	0	10	11	9	8	9	9	9	9	9

Updated to match(es) played on November 2, 2025. Source: NWSL soccer.com
A = Away; H = Home; W = Win; D = Draw; L = Loss; P = Postponed

== Appearances and goals ==
As of November 2, 2025

No.	Pos	Nat	Player	Total		Regular season		Playoffs	
No.	Pos	Nat	Player	Apps	Goals	Apps	Goals	Apps	Goals
Goalkeepers:
1	GK	(United States) USA	Casey Murphy	21	0	21	0	0	0
44	GK	(United States) USA	Marisa Jordan	5	0	5	0	0	0
--	GK	(United States) USA	Katie Cappelletti	0	0	0	0	0	0
Defenders:
3	DF	(United States) USA	Kaleigh Kurtz	26	1	26	1	0	0
4	DF	(United States) USA	Natalie Jacobs	6	0	6	0	0	0
11	DF	(Germany) GER	Feli Rauch	10	2	10	2	0	0
12	DF	(United States) USA	Natalia Staude	9	0	9	0	0	0
13	DF	(United States) USA	Ryan Williams	26	1	26	1	0	0
27	DF	(United States) USA	Maycee Bell	24	0	24	0	0	0
-	DF	(United States) USA	Sydney Schmidt	0	0	0	0	0	0
Midfielders:
2	MF	(United States) USA	Ashley Sanchez	23	2	23	2	0	0
8	MF	(United States) USA	Brianna Pinto	19	3	19	3	0	0
10	MF	(Republic of Ireland) IRL	Denise O'Sullivan	18	0	18	0	0	0
16	MF	(United States) USA	Riley Jackson	25	2	25	2	0	0
17	MF	(United States) USA	Dani Weatherholt	12	0	12	0	0	0
20	MF	(Japan) JPN	Shinomi Koyama	25	3	25	3	0	0
25	MF	(United States) USA	Meredith Speck	15	1	15	1	0	0
34	MF	(Japan) JPN	Manaka Matsukubo	26	11	26	11	0	0
80	MF	(United States) USA	Oli Peña	0	0	0	0	0	0
Forwards:
14	FW	(United States) USA	Tyler Lussi	21	2	21	2	0	0
15	FW	(United States) USA	Payton Linnehan	9	0	9	0	0	0
22	FW	(Australia) AUS	Cortnee Vine	16	1	16	1	0	0
28	FW	(United States) USA	Heather MacNab	2	0	2	0	0	0
30	FW	(United States) USA	Hannah Betfort	19	2	19	2	0	0
77	FW	(Brazil) BRA	Aline Gomes Amaro	14	1	14	1	0	0
Players who left the club during the season:
--	GK	(United States) USA	Hensley Hancuff	0	0	0	0	0	0
7	DF	(United States) USA	Malia Berkely	11	0	11	0	0	0
16	DF	(United States) USA	Sydney Collins	0	0	0	0	0	0
24	DF	(Canada) CAN	Brooklyn Courtnall	2	0	2	0	0	0
22	MF	(United States) USA	Michaela Hahn	0	0	0	0	0	0
19	MF	(United States) USA	Jaedyn Shaw	19	3	19	3	0	0
33	DF	(Australia) AUS	Charlotte McLean	0	0	0	0	0	0

== Transactions ==
=== Transfers ===
==== In ====
Date	Player	Position	Source club	Fee/notes	Ref
January 14, 2025	(United States) Jaedyn Shaw	MF	San Diego Wave FC	$450,000	
January 21, 2025	(Japan) Shinomi Koyama	MF	Djurgårdens IF Fotboll (women)	$225,000	
May 22, 2025	(United States) Katie Cappelletti	GK	None	Training player signed to contract through 2025	
September 5, 2025	(United States) Heather MacNab	FW	None	Training player signed to contract through 2025	
September 12, 2025	(United States) Oli Peña	MF	None	Free agent signed to a contract through 2026	
September 12, 2025	(United States) Natalie Jacobs	DF	Houston Dash	$75,000 + Malia Berkely	
August 30, 2025	(United States) Payton Linnehan	FW	Portland Thorns FC	$48,000	
October 16, 2025	(United States) Sydney Schmidt	DF	Sporting JAX (women) (unpaid academy contract)	Signed through 2027	

==== Out ====
Date	Player	Position	Destination club	Fee/notes	Ref
February 18, 2025	(Canada) Bianca St-Georges	FW	None	Mutual Termination	
August 22, 2025	(Canada) Sydney Collins	DF	Bay FC	$60,000	
September 11, 2025	(United States) Jaedyn Shaw	MF	Gotham FC	$1.25m	
September 12, 2025	(United States) Malia Berkely + $75,000	DF	Houston Dash	Natalie Jacobs	

=== Loans ===
Date	Player	Position	Destination club	Fee/notes	Ref
January 31, 2025	(Canada) Victoria Pickett	MF	AFC Toronto (NSL)	Loan	
July 14, 2025	(Australia) Charlotte McLean	DF	Tampa Bay Sun FC (USLS)	Loan	
August 28, 2025	(Canada) Brooklyn Courtnall	DF	Bay FC (NWSL)	Loan	

=== Contracts ===
==== Extensions ====
Date	Player	Position	Notes	Ref
August 27, 2025	(Germany) Felicitas Rauch	DF	2027	
August 30, 2025	(United States) Payton Linnehan	FW	2027 + 2028 mutual option	
December 1, 2025	(United States) Dani Weatherholt	MF	2026	
December 3, 2025	(United States) Riley Jackson	MF	2028	

== Awards ==
=== NWSL season awards ===
Player	Ref.
(Japan) Manaka Matsukubo	

=== NWSL Best XI ===
Position	Player	Ref.
MF	(Japan) Manaka Matsukubo	

=== NWSL Player of the Month ===
Month	Player	Ref.
October/November	(Japan) Manaka Matsukubo	

=== NWSL Team of the Month ===
Month	Player	Ref.
March	(United States) Ryan Williams	
April	(United States) Ryan Williams	
May	(Japan) Manaka Matsukubo	
June	(Japan) Manaka Matsukubo	
October/November	(Japan) Manaka Matsukubo	

=== NWSL Player of the Week ===
Week	Nat.	Player	Club	Ref.
9	(Japan)	Manaka Matsukubo	North Carolina Courage	
25	(Japan)	Manaka Matsukubo	North Carolina Courage	

=== NWSL Goal of the Week ===
Week	Nat.	Player	Honor	Ref.
9	(Japan)	Manaka Matsukubo	Nominee	
11	(Japan)	Manaka Matsukubo	Nominee	
17	(Japan)	Manaka Matsukubo	Nominee	
20	(Japan)	Manaka Matsukubo	Nominee	
25	(Japan)	Manaka Matsukubo	Nominee	

=== NWSL Save of the Week ===
Week	Nat.	Player	Honor	Ref.
1	(United States)	Casey Murphy	Nominee	
9	(United States)	Casey Murphy	Nominee	
