= 2021 Big 12 Conference women's soccer tournament =

Collegiate women's soccer tournament

- Classification: Division I
- Teams: 8
- Matches: 7
- Attendance: 4,345
- Site: Round Rock Multipurpose Complex; Round Rock, Texas
- Champions: TCU (1st title)
- Winning coach: Eric Bell (1st title)
- MVP: Messiah Bright (Offensive); Jenna Winebrenner (Defensive) (TCU)
- Broadcast: ESPN+ (Quarterfinals & Semifinals); ESPNU (Final)

2021 Big 12 Conference women's soccer standings
	Conf.						Overall
Team	W		L		T	PCT	W		L		T	PCT
No. 9 TCU ‍†‍‡‍^{y}	7	–	1	–	1	.833	19	–	2	–	2	.870
Texas ‍‍‍^{y}	6	–	0	–	3	.833	11	–	5	–	6	.636
Baylor ‍‍‍	4	–	2	–	3	.611	8	–	5	–	6	.579
Oklahoma State ‍‍‍	4	–	3	–	1	.563	9	–	6	–	3	.583
Texas Tech ‍‍‍	4	–	4	–	1	.500	11	–	6	–	3	.625
West Virginia ‍‍‍	3	–	3	–	3	.500	10	–	5	–	5	.625
Oklahoma ‍‍‍	4	–	5	–	0	.444	8	–	11	–	1	.425
Iowa State ‍‍‍	2	–	6	–	0	.250	5	–	11	–	1	.324
Kansas ‍‍‍	2	–	7	–	0	.222	7	–	11	–	1	.395
Kansas State ‍‍‍	1	–	6	–	2	.222	6	–	10	–	2	.389
† – Conference champion ‡ – 2021 Big 12 Tournament champion y – Invited to the NCAA Tournament; As of December 7, 2021; Rankings from United Soccer Coaches Poll; Source: The Big 12 Conference

The 2021 Big 12 Conference women's soccer tournament was the postseason women's soccer tournament for the Big 12 Conference held from October 31 to November 7, 2021. The 7-match tournament was held at the Round Rock Multipurpose Complex in Round Rock, Texas. The 8-team single-elimination tournament consisted of three rounds based on seeding from regular season conference play. The Kansas Jayhawks were the defending champions from 2019. There was no tournament held in 2020 due to the COVID-19 pandemic. Kansas was unable to defend its title as the team did not qualify for the tournament. TCU won the title by defeating Texas 2–1 in the final. This was the first title in school history for TCU and head coach Eric Bell. As tournament champions, TCU earned the Big 12's automatic berth into the 2021 NCAA Division I Women's Soccer Tournament.

== Bracket ==
Quarterfinals; Sunday, Oct. 31
1	TCU (pen.)	0 (3)
8	Iowa State	0 (2)
4	Oklahoma State	0 (4)
5	Texas Tech (pen.)	0 (5)
2	Texas	5
7	Oklahoma	2
3	Baylor	0
6	West Virginia	1

Semifinals; Thursday, Nov. 4
1	TCU	3
5	Texas Tech	0
2	Texas (pen.)	0 (4)
6	West Virginia	0 (3)

Final; Sunday, Nov. 7
1	TCU	2
2	Texas	1

== Schedule ==
=== Quarterfinals ===
October 31, 2021	#1 TCU	0–0 (a.e.t.) (3–2 p)	#8 Iowa State	Round Rock, TX
11:30 a.m.		Report	(yellow card) 108' Tyra Shand	Stadium: Round Rock Multipurpose Complex; Attendance: 0 Referee: Richonne Clark; Assistant referees: Janae Thompson; William Torres; Fourth official: Esteban Rosano
	Penalties
	Grace Collins (penalty missed); Tatum Condrey (penalty scored); Jenna Winebrenner (penalty scored); Maddy Warren (penalty missed); Brandi Peterson (penalty scored)		(penalty missed) Emma Mira; (penalty scored) Sydney Thomas; (penalty scored) Magdalena Keck; (penalty missed) Meghan Carl; (penalty missed) Taylor Bee

October 31, 2021	#4 Oklahoma State	0–0 (a.e.t.) (4–5 p)	#5 Texas Tech	Round Rock, TX
2:00 p.m.		Report	(yellow card) 106' Kirsten Davis; (yellow card) 107' Team; (yellow card) 110' Team	Stadium: Round Rock Multipurpose Complex; Attendance: 0 Referee: Corey Rockwell; Assistant referees: Jamie Willis; Emily Brownback; Fourth official: Richonne Clark
	Penalties
	Grace Yochum (penalty scored); Kim Rodriguez (penalty scored); Ally Jackson (penalty scored); Samiah Phiri (penalty missed); Charm Morgan (penalty scored); Summer Chaffin (penalty missed)		(penalty scored) Macy Blackburn; (penalty scored) Macy Schultz; (penalty scored) Charlotte Teeter; (penalty scored) Ashleigh Williams; (penalty missed) Hannah Anderson; (penalty scored) Jordie Harr

October 31, 2021	#2 Texas	5–2	#7 Oklahoma	Round Rock, TX
5:30 p.m.	Mackenzie McFarland 35', 41'; Trinity Byars 58', 73', 79'; Lauren Lapomarda (yellow card) 86'	Report	(yellow card) 21' Team; 54' Bailey Wesco; (yellow card) 68' Olivia Odle; 73' Jasmine Richards	Stadium: Round Rock Multipurpose Complex; Attendance: 0 Referee: Sorin Stoica; Assistant referees: Janae Thompson; William Torres; Fourth official: Esteban Rosano

October 31, 2021	#3 Baylor	0–1	#6 West Virginia	Round Rock, TX
8:00 p.m.	Mackenzie Anthony (yellow card) 24'; Maddie Algya (yellow card) 70'	Report	80' Dilary Heredia-Beltrán	Stadium: Round Rock Multipurpose Complex; Attendance: 1,110; Referee: Timothy Debysingh; Assistant referees: Jamie Willis; Emily Brownback; Fourth official: Corey Rockwell

=== Semifinals ===
November 4, 2021	#1 TCU	3–0	#5 Texas Tech	Round Rock, TX
4:30 p.m.	Messiah Bright 12', 28'; Skylar Heinrich 80'; Lauren Memoly (yellow card) 83'	Report		Stadium: Round Rock Multipurpose Complex; Attendance: 0 Referee: Esteban Rosano; Assistant referees: Hakan Olasmis; Emily Donahue; Fourth official: Travis Haight

November 4, 2021	#2 Texas	0–0 (a.e.t.) (4–3 p)	#6 West Virginia	Round Rock, TX
7:00 p.m.		Report	(yellow card) 84' Team	Stadium: Round Rock Multipurpose Complex; Attendance: 1,377; Referee: Daniel Radford; Assistant referees: Josh Allen; Travis Haight; Fourth official: Shane Butler
	Penalties
	Emma Regan (penalty scored); Lexi Missimo (penalty missed); Julia Grosso (penalty scored); Trinity Byars (penalty scored); Cameron Brooks (penalty scored)		(penalty scored) Jordan Brewster; (penalty scored) Gabrielle Robinson; (penalty missed) Juliana Lynch; (penalty scored) Maddie Murphy; (penalty missed) Dilary Heredia-Beltrán

=== Final ===
November 7, 2021	#1 TCU	2–1	#2 Texas	Round Rock, TX
2:30 p.m.	Messiah Bright 60'; Camryn Lancaster 84'	Report	39' Ashlyn Miller	Stadium: Round Rock Multipurpose Complex; Attendance: 1,858; Referee: Mark Kadlecik; Assistant referees: Bernardo van Steenberghe; Janae Thompson; Fourth official: Shane Butler

== Statistics ==
=== Goalscorers ===
There were 14 goals scored in 7 matches, for an average of 2 goals per match (as of November 7, 2021).

3 goals

- Messiah Bright – TCU
- Trinity Byars – Texas

2 goals

- Mackenzie McFarland – Texas

1 goal

- Jasmine Richards – Oklahoma
- Bailey Wesco – Oklahoma
- Skylar Heinrich – TCU
- Camryn Lancaster – TCU
- Ashlyn Miller – Texas
- Dilary Heredia-Beltrán – West Virginia

== All-Tournament team ==
Position	Player	Team
GK	Lauren Kellett	TCU
DF	Brandi Peterson	TCU
DF	Jenna Winebrenner	TCU
DF	Emily Cox	Texas
MF	Gracie Brian	TCU
MF	Julia Grosso	Texas
MF	Lexi Missimo	Texas
FW	Messiah Bright*	TCU
FW	Camryn Lancaster	TCU
FW	Trinity Byars	Texas
FW	Mackenzie McFarland	Texas
FW	Dilary Heredia-Beltrán	West Virginia

* Offensive MVP
^ Defensive MVP
