= Lauren Kellett =

American soccer player (born 2002)

Personal information
- Full name: Lauren Nicole Kellett
- Date of birth: February 15, 2002 (age 24)
- Height: 5 ft 8 in (1.73 m)
- Position: Goalkeeper

Youth career
- Sting SC

College career
Years	Team	Apps	(Gls)
2020–2023	TCU Horned Frogs	69	(0)

Senior career*
Years	Team	Apps	(Gls)
2024–2025	Tampa Bay Sun	0	(0)
2026	Grindavík/Njarðvík	10	(0)
- * Club domestic league appearances and goals as of 23:33, July 26, 2026 (UTC)

Lauren Nicole Kellett (born February 2, 2002) is an American former professional soccer player who played as a goalkeeper. She played college soccer for the TCU Horned Frogs, where she set the program record for career shutouts and was named the Big 12 Goalkeeper of the Year in 2021. She spent two years playing professionally, first contributing to the inaugural USL Super League title with Tampa Bay Sun FC before ending her career in Iceland with Besta deild kvenna club Grindavík/Njarðvík.

== Early life ==
Kellett grew up in Coppell, Texas, where she started playing as a goalkeeper after three years as an outfield player. She attended Coppell High School, where she participated in both soccer and multiple jumping-related track and field events. With the soccer team, Kellett was a backup goalkeeper in her freshman year before becoming the team's starter in her next three seasons. She received one all-state first-team honor, one district MVP honor, and one district goalkeeper of the year honor en route to three district titles. Kellett also played club soccer for Sting SC.

== College career ==
As a freshman with the TCU Horned Frogs, Kellett was one of Emily Alvarado's backups. She made 3 appearances, including one in the 2020 NCAA Tournament. Following Alvarado's departure from the program, Kellett became the Horned Frogs' first-choice goalkeeper, starting all 24 matches of the 2021 fall season. Her 10 shutouts set a TCU program record and ranked third in the nation; she also recorded the second-highest goals-against average in school history. Kellett participated in the Horned Frogs' NCAA Tournament run, which eventually ended in a penalty shootout loss to Rutgers in the sweet sixteen. During the shootout, she saved two penalties, but TCU was defeated nevertheless. Kellett's performances earned her recognition as the Big 12 Goalkeeper of the Year. She was also named to the All-Big 12 first team and the All-Midwest first team.

Ahead of her junior year, Kellett was named to the Mac Hermann Trophy preseason watchlist. While she did not win the Hermann Trophy in the end, Kellett still posted a solid season that earned her another spot on the All-Big 12 first team. She registered 10 shutouts for the second year in a row, this time in one less appearance. In October 2022, she was named the Big 12 Goalkeeper of the Week, her second such career honor. Kellett helped TCU advance to the Big 12 championship match and earn a spot in the NCAA Tournament, where they once again failed to progress past the sweet sixteen.

In her senior season, Kellett posted 77 saves across 19 matches. After recording a clean sheet against UAB in late August 2023, she officially set the TCU record for the most career shutouts. While Kellett could have chosen to utilize an extra season of NCAA eligibility afforded to athletes due to the COVID-19 pandemic, she ultimately opted not to return to TCU for a fifth season.

== Club career ==
After leaving college, Kellett joined the North Carolina Courage ahead of the 2024 NWSL campaign as a preseason trialist. While she did not sign with North Carolina's NWSL team, Kellett was able to play for the Courage's squad in the Soccer Tournament 2025. Kellett and the Courage advanced past the group stage of the competition before being eliminated by the US Women.

Although she fielded an offer to play in Sweden, Kellett eventually signed her first professional contract with Tampa Bay Sun FC ahead of the inaugural USL Super League season in July 2024. She had previously faced off against the Sun's 7-on-7 squad in the Soccer Tournament while playing for the Courage. As a backup goalkeeper behind Ashley Orkus, Kellett did not make any appearances for Tampa Bay before departing from the club on April 24, 2025. The Sun went on to win the USL Super League championship title at the end of the season, beating Floridian rivals Fort Lauderdale United FC in the final.

On 6 January 2026, newly promoted Icelandic club Grindavík/Njarðvík announced that they had signed Kellett ahead of their first season after moving into the Besta deild kvenna. Kellett played in 10 matches for the club in her half-year stint.

Kellett announced her retirement from professional soccer in July 2026.

== Career statistics ==
=== Club ===
Appearances and goals by club, season and competition
Club	Season	League			Cup		Playoffs (Note: Includes USL Super League playoffs)		Total	
Club	Season	Division	Apps	Goals	Apps	Goals	Apps	Goals	Apps	Goals
Tampa Bay Sun FC	2024–25	USL Super League	0	0	—		0	0	0	0
Grindavík/Njarðvík	2026	Besta deild kvenna	10	0	—		—		10	0
Career total			10	0	0	0	0	0	10	0

== Honors and awards ==
TCU Horned Frogs

- Big 12 Conference regular season: 2020, 2021
- Big 12 Conference women's soccer tournament: 2021

Tampa Bay Sun FC

- USL Super League: 2024–25

Individual

- Big 12 Goalkeeper of the Year: 2021
- All-Big 12 first team: 2021, 2022, 2023
- Big 12 all-tournament team: 2021
