= Jenna Walker =

American soccer player (born 1999)

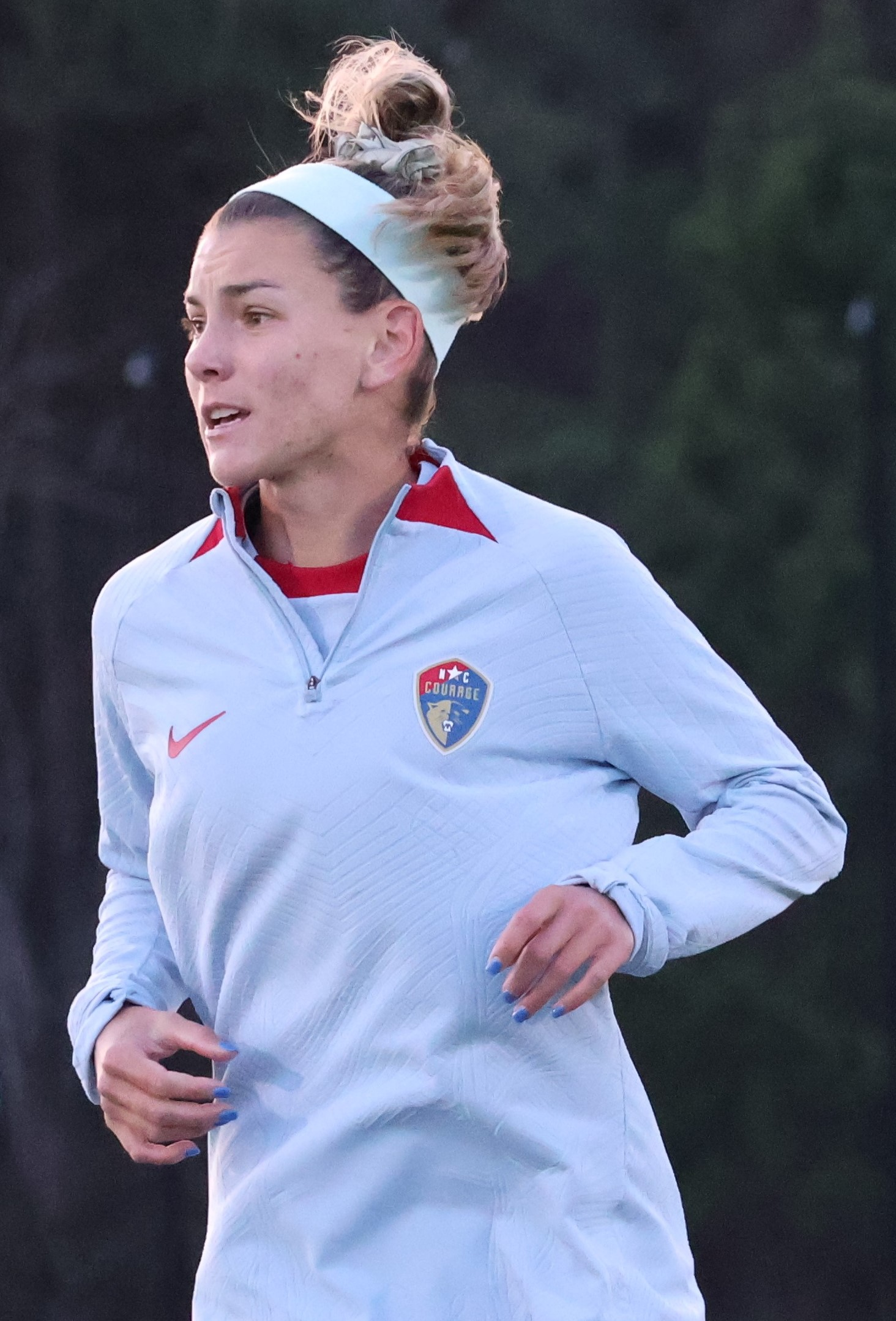
- Walker training with the North Carolina Courage in 2024

Personal information
- Birth name: Jenna Rae Winebrenner
- Date of birth: March 1, 1999 (age 27)
- Height: 5 ft 7 in (1.70 m)
- Position: Center back

College career
Years	Team	Apps	(Gls)
2017–2020	Notre Dame Fighting Irish	55	(2)
2021	TCU Horned Frogs	24	(0)

Senior career*
Years	Team	Apps	(Gls)
2022–2023	Kansas City Current	19	(0)
2024	North Carolina Courage	0	(0)
2024–2025	Dallas Trinity	23	(0)

Managerial career
- 2022–2023: Kansas City Comets (assistant)
- * Club domestic league appearances and goals as of May 31, 2025

Jenna Walker (née Winebrenner; born March 1, 1999) is an American former professional soccer player who played as a center back. She played college soccer for the Notre Dame Fighting Irish and the TCU Horned Frogs; she helped lead the latter to its first Big Ten tournament title. She was drafted by hometown club Kansas City Current in the fourth round of the 2022 NWSL Draft. After two years there, including a stint as assistant coach to the Kansas City Comets of the Major Arena Soccer League (MASL), she played for Dallas Trinity in the inaugural USL Super League season before retiring in 2025.

== Early life ==
Walker grew up in Kansas City, Missouri, the younger of two children born to Eric and Lisa Winebrenner. She began playing soccer at age three. She played high school soccer at Park Hill High School, winning three consecutive Kansas City Suburban Red Conference titles, and also competed in basketball and cross country. She was named second-team all-state in 2014 and 2015 and first-team all-state in 2016 and 2017.

== College career ==
=== Notre Dame Fighting Irish ===
Walker played four seasons for Notre Dame Fighting Irish between 2017 and 2020, joining the starting lineup and playing 18 games as a sophomore. She tore her UCL during her sophomore season and played the rest of the year in a brace before undergoing surgery in the spring. She started all 21 games and scored 2 goals in her junior season. She started all 13 games in her senior season, which was shortened due to the COVID-19 pandemic.

=== TCU Horned Frogs ===
Walker transferred to the TCU Horned Frogs in 2021, starting all 24 games in her graduate season and earning first-team All-Big 12 Conference honors. She helped lead TCU to its first Big 12 tournament title in program history, assisting Messiah Bright's game winner against Texas Tech in the semifinals, and was named the tournament's defensive most valuable player. She assisted the team's first goal of the NCAA tournament and helped the team to the round of 16. While in college, Walker began coaching girls' soccer teams when she was home in Kansas City.

== Club career ==
=== Kansas City Current ===
The Kansas City Current selected Walker 41st overall in the fourth round of the 2022 NWSL Draft. She was signed to a one-year contract with the option to extend for another year, which was exercised. She made her professional debut on March 18, 2022, playing the full 90 minutes in a 1–1 draw against Racing Louisville in the 2022 NWSL Challenge Cup group stage. She remained in the lineup for all but one of the Current's games in the Challenge Cup, helping the team reach the semifinals. She started six of the first seven regular-season games before being left out the eleven after early June. After the Current placed fifth in the regular season, Walker was unused in the playoffs as the team reached the championship game, losing to the Portland Thorns. Walker made 18 appearances (12 starts) in all competitions in her rookie season.

After her rookie season, Walker was hired as an assistant coach by the Kansas City Comets of the Major Arena Soccer League (MASL) on November 22, 2022, becoming the first female coach in MASL history. She knew Comets head coach Leo Gibson and assistant coach Stefan Stokic from her youth soccer days. Her duties included analyzing game film and scrimmaging with the men in practice. She said the opportunity to train with the indoor team was "an ideal situation for the offseason".

Walker made 14 appearances (7 starts) in all competitions in the 2023 season. On July 22, 2023, starting out of position in midfield, Walker recorded her first two professional assists against the Houston Dash, setting up the first two goals of Kristen Hamilton's hat trick in a 3–1 victory in the 2023 NWSL Challenge Cup group stage. After missing the playoffs, the Current did not re-resign Walker to the team.

=== Dallas Trinity ===
Walker joined the North Carolina Courage as a non-roster invitee in the 2024 preseason and signed with the team as an injury replacement player. On August 1, 2024, she was waived by the Courage and signed Dallas Trinity ahead of the USL Super League's inaugural season. She appeared in the starting lineup of Trinity's first-ever game on August 18, which they drew 1–1 against the Tampa Bay Sun. She started 23 regular-season games and one playoff game, helping Dallas place third out of eight teams before losing to the Tampa Bay Sun in the semifinals.

Walker announced her retirement from soccer on June 9, 2025.

== Personal life ==
Walker is married to professional lacrosse player Ethan Walker. They got engaged in July 2024.

During her playing career, Walker always wore a green headband on the field.

== Honors and awards ==
TCU Horned Frogs

- Big 12 Conference tournament: 2021

Individual

- USL Super League Team of the Month: December 2024
- First-team All-Big 12: 2021
- Big 12 Conference tournament defensive most valuable player: 2021
