= Kamdyn Fuller =

American soccer player (born 2008)

Personal information
- Date of birth: August 8, 2008 (age 18)
- Height: 5 ft 5 in (1.65 m)
- Position: Midfielder

Team information
- Current team: TCU Horned Frogs
- Number: 10

College career
Years	Team	Apps	(Gls)
2025–	TCU Horned Frogs	39	(5)

Senior career*
Years	Team	Apps	(Gls)
2024	Dallas Trinity	3	(0)

International career^{‡}
2026–	United States U-18	1	(0)
- * Club domestic league appearances and goals ‡ National team caps and goals as of 00:01, September 12, 2026 (UTC)

Kamdyn Fuller (born August 8, 2008) is an American college soccer player who plays as a midfielder for the TCU Horned Frogs. She was named the Big 12 Freshman of the Year in 2025.

== Early life ==
Fuller grew up in Southlake, Texas. She practiced gymnastics before moving to soccer. She played club soccer for Solar SC, winning two(2) national titles and earning ECNL all-conference honors. In her freshman year at Carroll Senior High School in 2023, she scored 25 goals with 15 assists, making her the team's second-leading scorer after her sister Kennedy, and was named the district's newcomer of the year. In her sophomore year in 2024, after her sister left to join Angel City FC, she scored 41 goals with 24 assists and was named the district's offensive most valuable player.

In the fall of 2024, Fuller joined USL Super League club Dallas Trinity on an academy contract (allowing her to retain college eligibility), making three appearances in the league's inaugural season. In the spring of 2025, she scored 26 goals with 6 assists in half a season for Carroll, earning the district MVP award. She broke the school record for career goals in three seasons. She was originally part of Texas Christian University's incoming class of 2026 but graduated high school a year early to begin college at age 16.

== College career ==
Fuller started 23 games and scored 4 goals for the TCU Horned Frogs as a freshman in 2025, helping the team win the Big 12 Conference regular-season title. In the NCAA tournament third round, she scored a critical header from a corner with seconds remaining to equalize against defending champions North Carolina, with TCU advancing on penalties. The team reached the NCAA semifinals for the first time in program history, losing to Florida State. Fuller was named first-team All-Big 12 and the Big 12 Freshman of the Year. She started 16 games and scored 1 goals as a sophomore in 2026, receiving second-team All-Big 12 honors.

== International career ==
Fuller was called into identification camp with the United States under-15 team in 2022.

== Personal life ==
Fuller is the daughter of Kim and Kris Fuller. She has an older sister, Kennedy, who plays professional soccer for Bay FC, and a younger brother, Kolton.

== Honors and awards ==
TCU Horned Frogs

- Big 12 Conference: 2025

Individual

- Big 12 Freshman of the Year: 2025
- First-team All-Big 12: 2025
- Second-team All-Big 12: 2026
