= Ashlyn Miller =

American soccer player (born 2003)

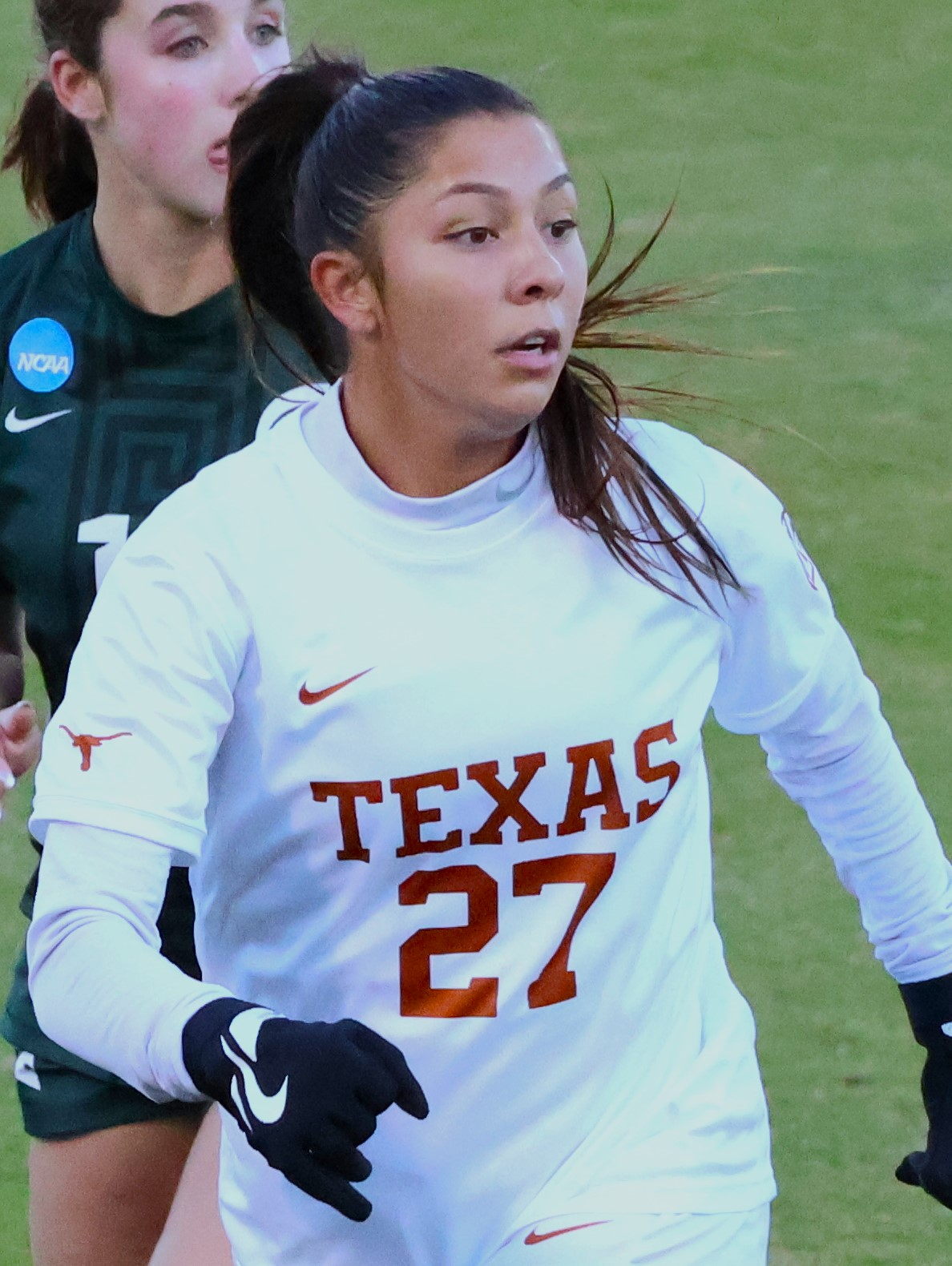
- Miller with Texas in 2024

Personal information
- Full name: Ashlyn Reed Miller
- Date of birth: May 16, 2003 (age 23)
- Height: 5 ft 3 in (1.60 m)
- Positions: Forward; midfielder

Team information
- Current team: Brooklyn FC
- Number: 27

Youth career
- Solar SC

College career
Years	Team	Apps	(Gls)
2021–2024	Texas Longhorns	89	(10)

Senior career*
Years	Team	Apps	(Gls)
2025	San Diego Wave	0	(0)
2025–2026	Brisbane Roar	20	(3)
2026–	Brooklyn FC	1	(0)
- * Club domestic league appearances and goals as of 05:41, August 16, 2026 (UTC)

Ashlyn Reed Miller (born May 16, 2003) is an American professional soccer player who plays as a forward or midfielder for USL Super League club Brooklyn FC. She played college soccer for the Texas Longhorns.

== Early life ==
Miller was born to former college athletes Valeria and Sean Miller. She grew up in McKinney, Texas, and attended Liberty High School. Miller chose not to play high school soccer and instead devoted her time playing with local club team Solar SC. She was named as the 33rd best midfielder in the United States' Class of 2021 by the ECNL's rating metrics.

== College career ==
Miller played for the Texas Longhorns women's soccer team. She totaled 20 appearances as a freshman and registered 4 starts. She scored her first collegiate goal on November 7, 2021, converting a long-range shot against TCU in the Big 12 championship match. Miller had an increase in playing time in her sophomore year, starting in 15 of her 21 appearances. She played 90 minutes in all four of Texas' Big 12 and NCAA tournament matches. During the Longhorns' NCAA first-round match against Texas A&M, Miller scored to help propel her team to a 3–1 victory. She had a particularly successful September of 2022, recording two multi-assist games.

As a junior, Miller was tied for third on the Longhorns in goals scored. She also tallied a career-high 7 assists, one more than the previous season. Ahead of her senior year, Miller looked on as Texas relocated to the Southeastern Conference. She helped immediately stamp the Longhorns' place in the SEC by scoring the game-winner in Texas' first-ever win in their new conference, which came against Ole Miss. Over the course of the season, Miller shifted into a more significant leadership role both in games and off the field; her movement into the limelight was partially due to the injury and subsequent absence of future San Diego Wave teammate Trinity Byars. Miller ended up helping Texas cap off their first year in the SEC by winning the conference title.

== Club career ==
Miller signed her first professional deal, a national team replacement contract, with San Diego Wave FC on July 8, 2025. With her contract only activated through two mid-season friendlies against the Utah Royals, Miller not make an NWSL appearance for the club during her short stint.

On September 8, 2025, Miller signed for Australian club Brisbane Roar FC, participating in the 2025–26 A-League Women. On 3 January 2026, she scored her first A-League goal in an eventual 2–2 draw with the Wellington Phoenix. Later in the same month, Miller recorded a last-minute equalizer against Melbourne City to salvage a point in the 87th minute of the match.

On July 31, 2026, it was announced that Miller had signed with USL Super League club Brooklyn FC. She made her Super League debut on August 15, 2026, earning the start in Brooklyn's season-opening defeat to Lexington SC.

== Honors ==
Texas Longhorns

- Big 12 Conference: 2022
- Big 12 women's soccer tournament: 2023
- SEC women's soccer tournament: 2024
