= Seven Castain =

American soccer player (born 2004)

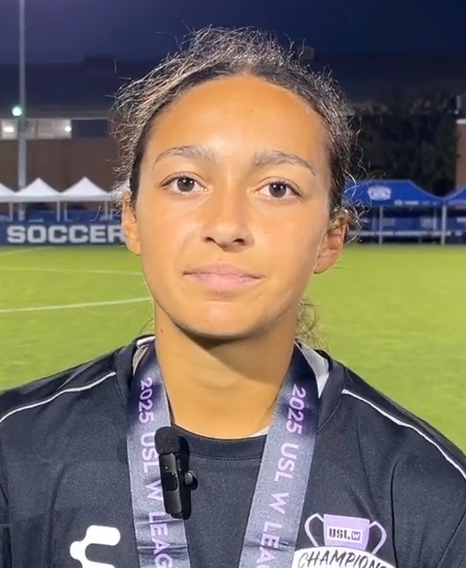
- Castain with Utah United in 2025

Personal information
- Full name: Seven Berlin Castain
- Date of birth: April 26, 2004 (age 22)
- Height: 5 ft 4 in (1.63 m)
- Position: Forward

Team information
- Current team: Dallas Trinity (on loan from the Orlando Pride)
- Number: 30

Youth career
- Utah Avalanche
- 2018–2021: Waterford Ravens

College career
Years	Team	Apps	(Gls)
2022–2025	TCU Horned Frogs	93	(40)

Senior career*
Years	Team	Apps	(Gls)
2022–2023	Utah Avalanche	–	(13)
2025	Utah United	12	(21)
2026–	Orlando Pride	11	(0)
2026–	→ Dallas Trinity (loan)	1	(1)
- * Club domestic league appearances and goals as of August 15, 2026

Seven Berlin Castain (born April 26, 2004) is an American professional soccer player who plays as a forward for USL Super League club Dallas Trinity, on loan from the Orlando Pride. She played college soccer for the TCU Horned Frogs, earning first-team All-American honors after leading the team to their first NCAA College Cup appearance in 2025.

== Early life ==
Castain grew up in Draper, Utah, the only child born to Heidi and Daren Castain. She was named for the number 7's biblical meaning of "lucky", "perfection", or "completeness". She played high school soccer at Waterford School in Sandy, Utah, setting a school record with 113 career goals in two-and-a-half seasons and earning first-team all-state selections three times. In her senior year in 2021, she was named high school All-American after setting a state record with 71 goals, including all four goals for her side in a 4–3 victory over Rowland Hall in the Class 2A state title game. She played club soccer for the Utah Avalanche, earning ECNL all-conference honors. She committed to TCU during her junior year.

== College career ==
Castain enrolled early at Texas Christian University at age 17 in the spring of 2022. In her freshman season, she scored 2 goals with 4 assists in 24 games (9 starts), earning Big 12 Conference all-freshman honors, and helped the TCU Horned Frogs to runner-up finishes for the Big 12 regular-season and tournament titles and the round of 16 in the NCAA tournament. She started all 19 games and scored 7 goals in her sophomore season in 2023, earning first-team All-Big 12 honors after helping TCU finish third in the conference.

Castain jointly led the conference with 13 goals in 23 games in her junior season in 2024, including a four-goal outburst against Colorado, and was named first-team All-Big 12 and fourth-team All-American. She helped lead the Horned Frogs to the Big 12 regular-season title and was named in the all-tournament team after reaching the Big 12 tournament final.

Castain ranked second in the conference with 17 goals in 24 games in her senior season in 2025, leading the team to their second consecutive Big 12 regular-season title. In the NCAA tournament, she scored five goals in the first two rounds as TCU reached the NCAA semifinals for the first time in program history. In the semifinals, she had two good chances including one in the last seconds in the 1–0 loss to Florida State. She was named first-team All-Big 12 and first-team All-American and won the Elite Scholar-Athlete Award for having the best grade-point average (4.0) at the NCAA College Cup.

During college, Castain also played for the Utah Avalanche in the Women's Premier Soccer League and Utah United in the USL W League. In 2025, Utah United's first year in the USL W League, she led the nation with 17 goals in 9 regular-season games. She added four goals in three playoff games, including one in the 4–0 victory over the North Carolina Courage U23 in the national final, and was named the USL W League Player of the Year.

== Club career ==
The Orlando Pride announced on January 16, 2026, that they had signed Castain to her first professional contract on a one-year deal. She made her professional debut in the season opener on March 15, starting in a 2–1 loss to the Seattle Reign. She made 11 appearances during her rookie season. On July 22, she signed a new two-year contract with the Pride with the mutual option for another year.

The same day, Castain was sent on loan to USL Super League club Dallas Trinity for the rest of the year. On August 15, she scored her first professional goal in her debut for the Trinity, a season-opening 1–1 draw against the Tampa Bay Sun.

== International career ==
Castain was called into United States national team development camp, training concurrently with the senior national team, in January 2026.

== Honors and awards ==
TCU Horned Frogs

- Big 12 Conference: 2024, 2025

Utah United

- USL W League: 2025

Individual

- First-team All-American: 2025
- Fourth-team All-American: 2024
- First-team All-Big 12: 2023, 2024, 2025
- Big 12 all-freshman team: 2022
- USL W League Player of the Year: 2025
- USL W League Golden Boot: 2025
- Elite Scholar-Athlete Award: 2025
