= Oli Peña =

American soccer player (born 2003)

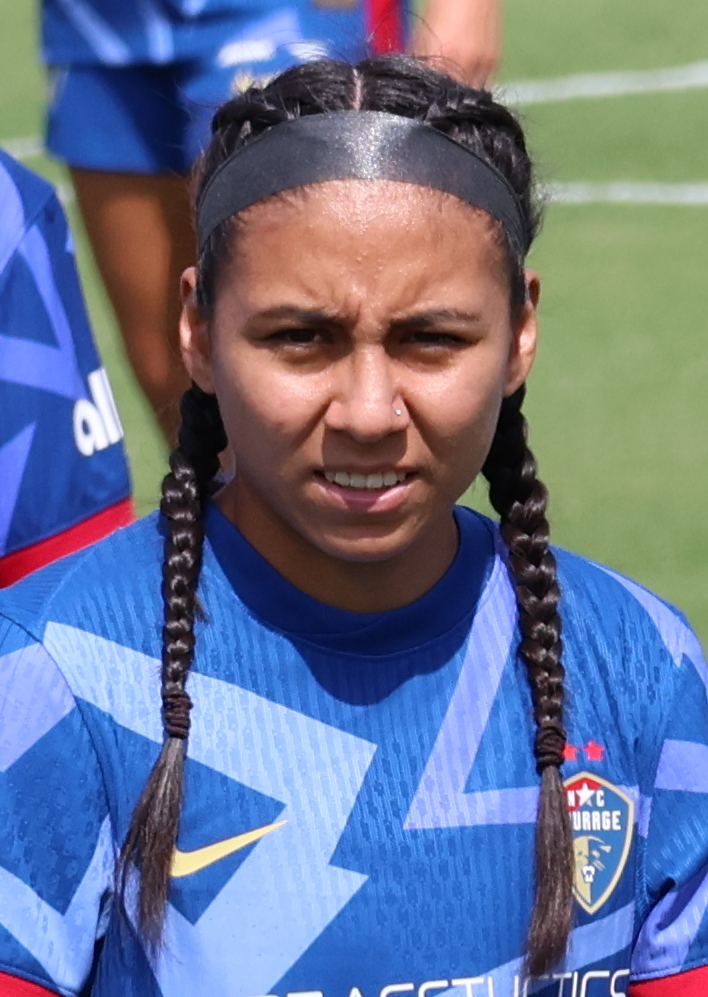
- Peña with the North Carolina Courage in 2025

Personal information
- Full name: Olivia Peña
- Date of birth: January 7, 2003 (age 23)
- Height: 5 ft 1 in (1.55 m)
- Position: Midfielder

Team information
- Current team: North Carolina Courage
- Number: 80

Youth career
- Solar SC

College career
| Years | Team | Apps | (Gls) |
| 2021–2024 | TCU Horned Frogs | 93 | (6) |

Senior career*
| Years | Team | Apps | (Gls) |
| 2025– | North Carolina Courage | 0 | (0) |

International career
| 2017 | United States U-15 | | |
- * Club domestic league appearances and goals

Olivia Peña (born January 7, 2003) is an American professional soccer player who plays as a midfielder for the North Carolina Courage of the National Women's Soccer League (NWSL). She played college soccer for the TCU Horned Frogs, winning Big 12 Midfielder of the Year in 2024.

== Early life ==
Peña grew up in Irving, Texas. She played club soccer for Solar SC, being named to the Best XI of their ECNL under-14 national title victory in 2017, and earning ECNL all-conference honors in 2021. She committed to Texas Christian University during her freshman year at Nimitz High School. TopDrawerSoccer ranked her as the No. 38 player of the 2021 class.

== College career ==
Peña played college soccer for the TCU Horned Frogs from 2021 to 2024. As a freshman in 2021, she made 24 appearances, including 14 starts, recording three goals and three assists, and was named to the Big 12 All-Freshman Team while also being selected to TopDrawerSoccer's Top 100 Freshmen list. She helped TCU win the Big 12 Conference regular-season championship, the Big 12 tournament title, and advance to the third round of the NCAA tournament.

In 2022, Peña started all 24 matches and recorded three assists. Following the season, she was named to the All-Big 12 Second Team and the Big 12 All-Tournament Team. She helped TCU finish as runners-up in both the Big 12 regular season and tournament before advancing to the third round of the NCAA tournament.

Peña started all 19 matches she played in during 2023, recording one goal and one assist. She was again named to the All-Big 12 Second Team.

As a senior in 2024, Peña started all 23 matches she played in, recording two goals and nine assists. She was named Big 12 Midfielder of the Year and earned selection to the All-Big 12 First Team, the Big 12 All-Tournament Team, and the United Soccer Coaches All-Midwest First Team. She helped TCU win the Big 12 regular-season title, reach the Big 12 tournament final, and advance to the second round of the NCAA tournament. Peña concluded her collegiate career with 93 appearances and six goals.

== Club career ==
After college, Peña played for Reunion City Dallas at The Soccer Tournament in 2025. On September 12, 2025, National Women's Soccer League (NWSL) club North Carolina Courage announced the signing of Peña to her first professional contract, a one-and-a-half-year deal through the end of the 2026 season.

== Personal life ==
Peña is the daughter of Sara and Pedro Peña and has four siblings. She announced her engagement to Mario Araiza in October 2025.

== Honors and awards ==
TCU Horned Frogs

- Big 12 Conference: 2021, 2024
- Big 12 Conference tournament: 2021

Individual

- Big 12 Midfielder of the Year: 2024
- First-team All-Big 12: 2024
- Second-team All-Big 12: 2022, 2023
- Big 12 all-freshman team: 2021
