= Ceri Bowley =

Welsh football executive (born 1987)

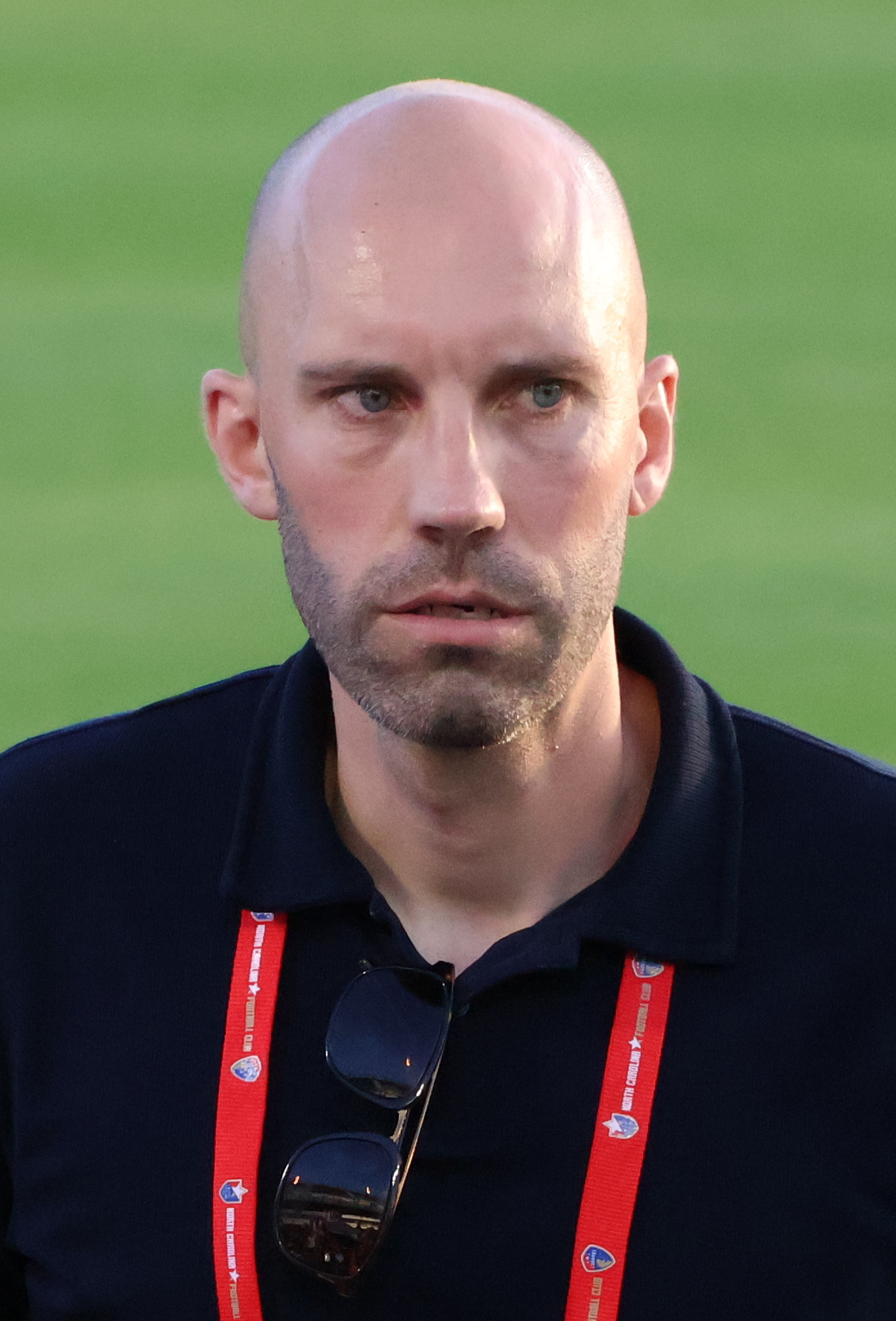
- Bowley with the North Carolina Courage in 2025

Personal information
- Date of birth: 1 August 1987 (age 39)
- Place of birth: Brecon, Wales

Team information
- Current team: North Carolina Courage (chief soccer officer and sporting director)

Managerial career
- Years: Team
- 2011–2013: Merthyr Town (academy manager)
- 2012–2014: Swansea City (youth coach)
- 2017–2019: Barry Town United (academy manager)
- 2019–2022: City Football Group (head of coaching support)
- 2022: Rangers (assistant)
- 2025–: North Carolina Courage (chief soccer officer and sporting director)

Ceri Bowley (born 1 August 1987) is a Welsh association football executive who is the chief soccer officer and sporting director for the North Carolina Courage of the National Women's Soccer League (NWSL).

== Career ==
Bowley left the Bristol Rovers academy at age 17 and gave up his playing career by 22. He began his managerial career with key roles in the youth academies of Merthyr Town, Swansea City, Barry Town United. He received his PhD in sport psychology and coaching science from Cardiff Metropolitan University in 2015 and his UEFA A License in 2016.

In 2019, Bowley joined City Football Group to oversee the coaching staffs at the company's multiple clubs around the world. He was responsible for implementing Manchester City manager Pep Guardiola's style at the 10 other clubs of the ownership group. In August 2022, he left City Group to become Giovanni van Bronckhorst's assistant at Scottish powerhouse Rangers, but his former City Group colleague was sacked three months later.

In January 2023, Bowley was named technical advisor for the Elite Clubs National League (ECNL), a national youth league in the United States. He also worked for the football advisory company Double Pass and as senior coaching pathway manager in the Premier League.

In April 2025, Bowley was appointed chief soccer officer and sporting director for the North Carolina Courage of the National Women's Soccer League (NWSL). Just over three months later, the Courage fired head coach Sean Nahas, with Bowley citing "a multitude of factors" going into the decision.
