= Jordan Brewster =

American soccer player (born 1999)

- Brewster with the Houston Dash in 2026

Personal information
- Full name: Jordan Lindsey Brewster
- Date of birth: September 27, 1999 (age 27)
- Place of birth: Canton, Ohio, U.S.
- Height: 5 ft 10 in (1.78 m)
- Position: Defender

Team information
- Current team: Houston Dash
- Number: 99

Youth career
- Internationals SC

College career
Years	Team	Apps	(Gls)
2018–2022	West Virginia Mountaineers	101	(9)

Senior career*
Years	Team	Apps	(Gls)
2023	Kristianstads DFF	17	(0)
2024–2025	Bay FC	2	(0)
2025–2026	→ América (loan)	10	(0)
2026	AFC Toronto	5	(0)
2026	→ NDC Ontario (loan)	1	(0)
2026–	Houston Dash	0	(0)

International career
2017	United States U18	2	(0)
2017	United States U19	2	(0)
2017–2018	United States U20	6	(0)
- * Club domestic league appearances and goals as of June 10, 2026

Jordan Lindsey Brewster (born September 27, 1999) is an American professional soccer player who plays as a defender for the Houston Dash of the National Women's Soccer League (NWSL). She played college soccer for the West Virginia Mountaineers.

== Early life ==
Brewster was born in Canton, Ohio, and attended Hoover High School. Brewster played youth club soccer with Internationals SC, playing both as a goalkeeper and forward.

== College career ==
Brewster attended West Virginia University, where she played as a defender for the West Virginia Mountaineers from 2018 to 2022. In five years, she played in 101 games, scoring 9 times and registering 11 assists. West Virginia made the NCAA Division I Tournament three times during that span, their furthest appearance being in the Round of 16 in 2019, Brewster's freshman season.

== Club career ==
Brewster went undrafted in the 2023 NWSL Draft and afterwards signed in Sweden with Kristianstads DFF on February 2, 2023, for the 2023 and 2024 seasons. She made 21 total appearances for the club, including 17 in the league and 4 in the 2022–23 Svenska Cupen, where she made her debut for the club in a 1–0 away win to FC Rosengård. She also scored her lone goal for the club in the cup competition, the first goal in a 6–2 group stage win against Alingsås FC United on March 11, 2023.

Brewster was announced as signed by NWSL expansion club Bay FC on March 11, 2024, on a contract through the 2025 season with an option for 2026. She made her NWSL debut on April 20, coming on as a second-half substitute for Kayla Sharples. Over a year later, she recorded her first start for Bay FC, playing 26 minutes of first-half action against Portland Thorns on June 7, 2025 before sustaining an injury and being substituted off early.

On July 28, 2025, Bay FC loaned Brewster out to Mexican side Club América through the end of the 2025 NWSL season. Brewster made her Liga MX Femenil debut against Querétaro on August 4, 2025. She played over 300 minutes in her stint with the club as América fell just shy of securing the Liga MX title. Upon returning to Bay FC at the end of the year, she was among the list of players announced to be departing from the team.

Brewster joined San Diego Wave FC as a non-roster invitee in the 2026 preseason, but did not make the team's final squad.

Brewster was announced at Northern Super League club AFC Toronto on April 17, 2026. She made 3 starts in 5 appearances for Toronto.

In September 2026, Brewster returned to the NWSL, signing a contract with the Houston Dash through the end of the 2026 season.

== International career ==
Brewster attended a United States under-14 national team camp in 2013, and went on to receive call ups from the U-18, U-19, and U-20 national teams. She played in multiple positions in the youth national team setup, initially being called in as a goalkeeper in 2013 but being called up as a forward in 2017 and on. Her two appearances with the U-18s came in friendlies against Australia's U-19s. She started in both matches, getting two assists in the second match. She served as the sole alternate for the United States U-20s at the 2018 CONCACAF Women's U-20 Championship, training with the team before the tournament but leaving as there was no injured player to replace upon the tournament starting.

== Career statistics ==
=== Club ===
As of March 31, 2025

Club	Season	League			Cup (Note: Includes Svenska cupen (women), NWSL Challenge Cup)		Playoffs (Note: Includes NWSL Playoffs)		Other		Total	
Club	Season	Division	Apps	Goals	Apps	Goals	Apps	Goals	Apps	Goals	Apps	Goals
Kristianstads DFF	2023	Damallsvenskan	17	0	4	1	—		—		21	1
Bay FC	2024	NWSL	1	0	—		0	0	3 (Note: Includes NWSL x Liga MX Femenil Summer Cup)	0	4	0
Bay FC	2025	NWSL	0	0	—		—		—		0	0
Bay FC	Total		1	0	0	0	0	0	3	0	4	0
Career total			18	0	4	1	0	0	3	0	25	1

== Honors ==
West Virginia Mountaineers

- Big 12 Conference women's soccer tournament: 2018, 2022

Individual

- Second-team All-American: 2020
- Third-team All-American: 2021, 2022
- First-team All-Big 12: 2020, 2021, 2022
- Second-team All-Big 12: 2018, 2019
- Big 12 Defensive Player of the Year: 2020
- Big 12 tournament Defensive MVP: 2022
