= Emily Alvarado =

Mexican footballer (born 1998)

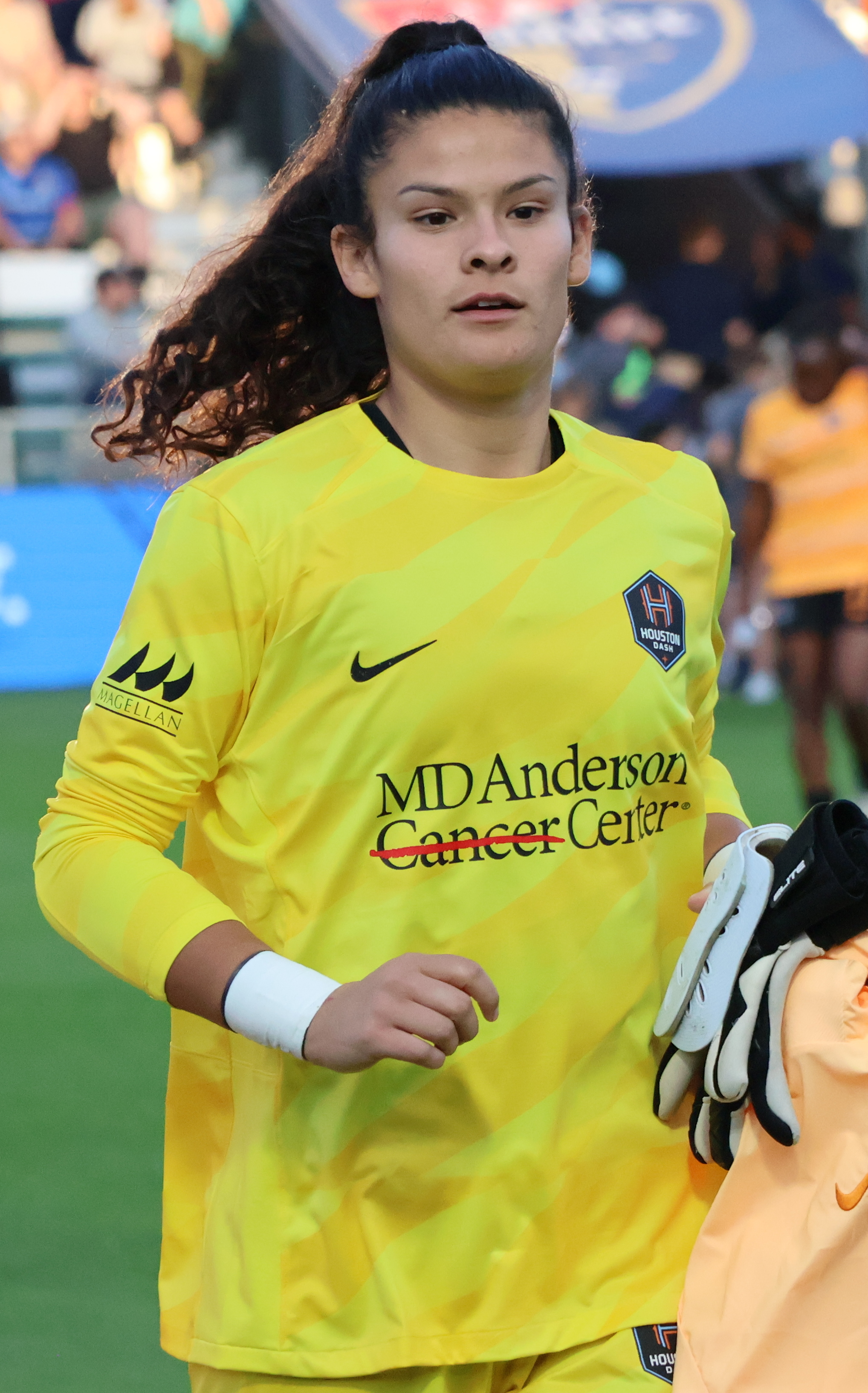
- Alvarado with the Houston Dash in 2024

Personal information
- Full name: Emily Sofia Alvarado Natividad
- Date of birth: 9 June 1998 (age 28)
- Place of birth: El Paso, Texas, U.S.
- Height: 1.80 m (5 ft 11 in)
- Position: Goalkeeper

Team information
- Current team: Juárez
- Number: 28

Youth career
- Texas Rush

College career
Years	Team	Apps	(Gls)
2017–2021	TCU Horned Frogs	58	(0)

Senior career*
Years	Team	Apps	(Gls)
2021–2023	Reims	39	(0)
2023–2024	Houston Dash	0	(0)
2024	Portland Thorns	0	(0)
2024–2025	Tijuana	16	(0)
2025–	Juárez	30	(0)

International career^{‡}
2013–2014	Mexico U17	4	(0)
2014–2018	Mexico U20	10	(0)
2019–	Mexico	19	(0)
- * Club domestic league appearances and goals as of 22 July 2024 ‡ National team caps and goals as of 20 April 2024

Emily Sofia Alvarado Natividad (born 9 June 1998) is a Mexican professional footballer who plays as a goalkeeper for Liga MX Femenil club FC Juárez. Born in the United States, she represents Mexico at international level.

== Youth career ==
Alvarado played youth soccer for the Houston Dynamo/Dash Youth club and the Elite Clubs National League club Texas Rush.

== Collegiate career ==
Alvarado was a team captain and starter for Texas Christian University's NCAA Division I women's soccer program in Fort Worth, Texas. She was a MAC Hermann Trophy semifinalist in the 2020–21 season, was named 2020–21 Big 12 Conference goalkeeper of the year, a first-team United Soccer Coaches All-American player, and ended her career as Texas Christian University's all-time career leader in shutouts with 21.

== Club career ==
=== Stade de Reims, 2021–2023 ===
On 18 July 2021, French Division 1 Féminine club Stade de Reims Féminines signed Alvarado to a two-year contract. She appeared in 39 of 40 matches and tallied 150 saves for Reims before leaving the team after its 25 March 2023 match against ASJ Soyaux-Charente.

=== Houston Dash, 2023–2024 ===
On 7 April 2023, the United States National Women's Soccer League club Houston Dash announced that it had signed Alvarado through the remainder of the 2023 season with an option to extend her contract through 2024.

=== Portland Thorns, 2024 ===
On 20 April 2024, the Houston Dash traded Alvarado to Portland Thorns FC in exchange for $35,000 in allocation money. On 16 August 2024, Portland waived Alvarado to allow her to pursue other opportunities abroad.

=== Club Tijuana, 2024–2026 ===
On 21 August 2024, Tijuana announced that they had signed Alvarado.

== International career ==
Alvarado made her senior debut for Mexico on 26 May 2019 in a friendly match against the United States.

== Honors and awards ==
Mexico U17

- CONCACAF Women's U-17 Championship: 2013

Mexico U20

- CONCACAF Women's U-20 Championship: 2018

Individual

- 2018 CONCACAF Women's U-20 Championship: Golden Glove
- Big 12 Conference Goalkeeper of the Year: 2020
- 2021 First-team United Soccer Coaches All-American player
- 2022-2023 National BUD of the year: Awarded by the Do Foundation
