= Dilary Heredia-Beltrán =

Mexican soccer player (born 2002)

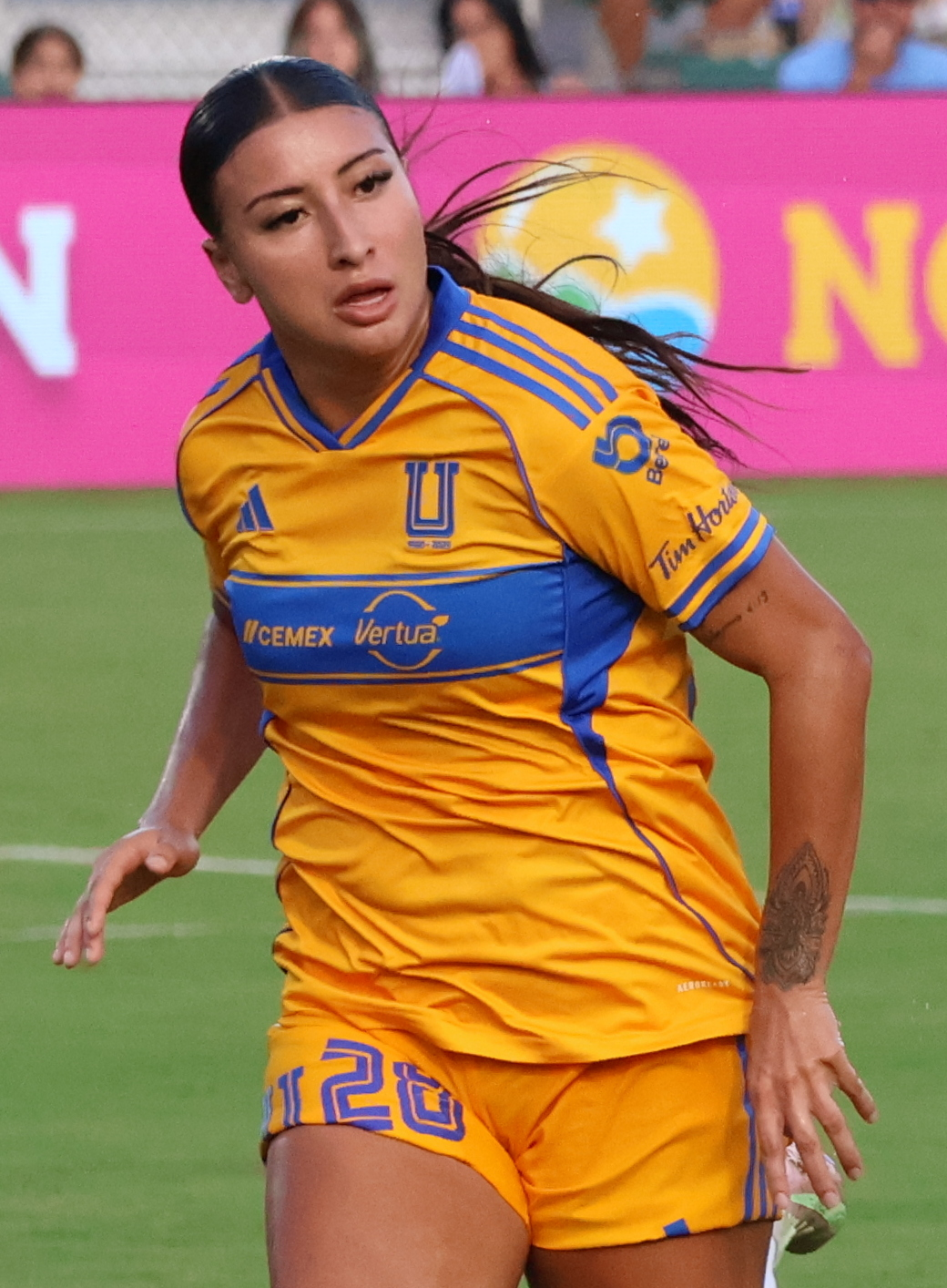
- Heredia-Beltrán with Tigres in 2025

Personal information
- Full name: Dilary Heredia-Beltrán
- Date of birth: September 9, 2002 (age 24)
- Place of birth: Wichita, Kansas, United States
- Height: 1.63 m (5 ft 4 in)
- Position: Attacking midfielder

Team information
- Current team: Querétaro
- Number: 7

College career
| Years | Team | Apps | (Gls) |
| 2021–2024 | West Virginia Mountaineers | 81 | (11) |

Senior career*
| Years | Team | Apps | (Gls) |
| 2025–2026 | UANL | 10 | (0) |
| 2026– | Querétaro | 0 | (0) |

International career
| 2025– | Mexico U23 | | |
- * Club domestic league appearances and goals as of July 18, 2025

Dilary Heredia-Beltrán (born September 9, 2002) is a professional soccer player who plays as a midfielder for Liga MX Femenil club UANL. Born in the United States, she has been called up to the Mexico U23.

== Early life and education ==
Heredia-Beltrán grew up in Wichita, Kansas. She attended West Virginia University and played forward on the Mountaineers team.

== Club career ==
In 2025, she started her career in UANL.

== International career ==
Since 2025, Heredia has been part of the Mexico U-23 team.

== Honours ==
Tigres UANL

- Liga MX Femenil: Apertura 2025
