= TCU Horned Frogs women's soccer =

American college soccer team

- Founded: 1986; 40 years ago
- University: Texas Christian University
- Athletic director: Mike Buddie
- Head coach: Eric Bell (15th season)
- Conference: Big 12
- Location: Fort Worth, Texas, US
- Stadium: Garvey-Rosenthal Stadium (capacity: 1,500)
- Nickname: Horned Frogs
- Colors: Purple and white
Home	Away

NCAA tournament College Cup
- 2025

NCAA tournament Quarterfinals
- 2020, 2025

NCAA tournament Round of 16
- 2020, 2021, 2022, 2025

NCAA tournament Round of 32
- 2018, 2020, 2021, 2022, 2024, 2025

NCAA tournament appearances
- 2016, 2017, 2018, 2019, 2020, 2021, 2022, 2024, 2025

Conference tournament championships
- 2021

Conference regular season championships
- 2020, 2021, 2024, 2025

The TCU Horned Frogs women's soccer team represents Texas Christian University in NCAA Division I college soccer. The team is part of the Big 12 Conference and plays home matches at Garvey-Rosenthal Stadium in Fort Worth, Texas. The Horned Frogs are currently helmed by head coach Eric Bell, who has led the team to nine NCAA Tournament appearances and five Big 12 conference titles.

== History ==
The TCU women's soccer program played their first season in 1986 under the direction of head coach David Rubinson, a TCU alum who was also the head coach of the men's team at the time. It was during Rubinson's tenure that the women's program became the university's lone scholarship soccer team when the men's program was cut by then-athletic director Eric Hyman in 2003.

In 26 seasons under Rubinson and his successor, Dan Abdalla, the Horned Frogs enjoyed limited success. Their eight winning seasons in that span were highlighted by a 9–8–2 campaign in 2003 that saw the Frogs finished tied for second place in Conference USA and a 14–4–2 mark in 2008 that earned a third-place finish in the Mountain West.

Eric Bell was hired as the program's third head coach in December 2011, just as the university was set to join the Big 12 Conference. Bell came to TCU from Florida State, where he helped lead the Seminoles to three College Cup appearances during his six seasons as an assistant coach in Tallahassee.

The Frogs made their first NCAA Tournament appearance under Bell in 2016 and won their first tournament match in 2018 with a 2–1 victory over BYU in the first round of the 2018 tournament.

On November 6, 2020, TCU earned its first conference championship by defeating West Virginia, 1–0, to finish their Big 12 schedule undefeated. Ranked third in the nation, it was at first thought that the Frogs' historic season would end without the chance to play for a national championship after the NCAA had announced in August that it was cancelling all fall sports championship events for the year due to the COVID-19 pandemic. However, the NCAA reversed course and announced a 48-team tournament to be held in the spring of 2021. The ensuing tournament saw the Frogs advance to the quarterfinal round for the first time.

On November 7, 2021, TCU achieved its first, and to date only, double, winning both the Big 12 regular season and conference championships. They defeated Texas 2–1 to claim their second conference title in as many weeks.

Eric Bell became the winningest coach in program history with a 3–2 victory over Iowa on August 21, 2025. He would later be named Big 12 Coach of the Year for the fourth time after leading the Frogs to their fourth regular season conference title in six years and a ninth NCAA tournament bid. In TCU's round of 16 tournament match versus defending national champion North Carolina, Kamdyn Fuller scored the tying goal with four seconds remaining in regulation, forcing sudden-death overtime. The Frogs would win the match in a shootout, advancing to the quarterfinal round for the second time in program history. TCU again came from behind in the quarterfinal against Vanderbilt, tying the match with four minutes remaining in regulation. In overtime, Morgan Brown drew a penalty, and Sydney Becerra converted, clinching TCU's first ever trip to the College Cup. The Frogs fell to the eventual champion Florida State Seminoles in the semifinal, 1–0.

== Stadium ==
The Horned Frogs play their home games at Garvey-Rosenthal Stadium, located on the south end of the TCU campus and adjacent to Lupton Stadium, the home of the TCU baseball team. It was built in 2000 on land that had previously been home to the Worth Hills Golf Course and had been acquired by the university from the Justin Boot Company. In 2010, the Jane Justin Field House opened at the north end of the stadium with updated locker rooms and coaches offices. The $1.5 million gift from the Justin family to fund the addition was the largest contribution ever at TCU for a project geared solely at women's athletics.

Capacity is officially 1,500, with additional standing room available on the grass berm next to the bleachers. TCU has averaged more than 1,100 per match since 2006, except for 2020 when capacity was capped at 375. The attendance record is 3,648, set on September 4, 2022, in a 2–1 loss to Duke.

== Coaches ==
Tenure	Coach	Seasons	Record	Pct.
1986–2004	David Rubinson	19	151–189–23	.448
2005–2011	Dan Abdalla	7	57–65–9	.469
2012–present	Eric Bell	15	172–93–46	.553
Totals	3 coaches	40 seasons	375–338–75	.523
Records are as of July 2, 2026.

== Seasons ==
Season	Coach	Overall	Conference	Standing	Postseason
David Rubinson (Independent) (1986–1994)
1986	David Rubinson	8–8–2			
1987	David Rubinson	10–9–0			
1988	David Rubinson	11–5–1			
1989	David Rubinson	9–10–0			
1990	David Rubinson	6–13–2			
1991	David Rubinson	4–10–3			
1992	David Rubinson	9–7–3			
1993	David Rubinson	8–9–1			
1994	David Rubinson	9–8–1			
David Rubinson (Southwest Conference) (1995)
1995	David Rubinson	8–12–1	1–3–0	4th	
David Rubinson (Western Athletic Conference) (1996–2000)
1996	David Rubinson	7–13–0	2–5–0	5th	
1997	David Rubinson	10–11–0	3–3–0	4th	
1998	David Rubinson	9–11–0	2–4–0	4th	
1999	David Rubinson	9–11–0	2–4–0	5th	
2000	David Rubinson	10–9–1	5–2–0	3rd	
David Rubinson (Conference USA) (2001–2004)
2001	David Rubinson	7–11–0	3–7–0	10th	
2002	David Rubinson	2–13–5	1–7–2	13th	
2003	David Rubinson	9–8–2	7–3–0	T-2nd	
2004	David Rubinson	6–11–1	4–5–1	T-8th	
David Rubinson:		151–189–23	SWC: 1–3–0; WAC: 14–18–0; CUSA: 15–22–3		
Dan Abdalla (Mountain West Conference) (2005–2011)
2005	Dan Abdalla	6–11–0	1–6–0	7th	
2006	Dan Abdalla	6–8–4	1–3–3	7th	
2007	Dan Abdalla	8–11–0	3–4–0	6th	
2008	Dan Abdalla	14–4–2	4–2–1	3rd	
2009	Dan Abdalla	9–10–0	2–5–0	6th	
2010	Dan Abdalla	7–10–2	1–5–1	8th	
2011	Dan Abdalla	7–11–1	1–5–0	T-6th	
Dan Abdalla:		57–65–9	13–30–5		
Eric Bell (Big 12) (2012–present)
2012	Eric Bell	7–10–4	1–5–2	8th	
2013	Eric Bell	6–10–3	2–5–1	7th	
2014	Eric Bell	8–8–3	1–4–3	8th	
2015	Eric Bell	8–7–4	2–2–3	8th	
2016	Eric Bell	12–7–2	2–5–1	7th	NCAA 1st Round
2017	Eric Bell	12–7–3	6–2–1	3rd	NCAA 1st Round
2018	Eric Bell	13–5–3	5–3–1	T-3rd	NCAA 2nd Round
2019	Eric Bell	11–8–3	4–3–2	6th	NCAA 1st Round
2020	Eric Bell	12–2–2	8–0–1	1st	NCAA Quarterfinals
2021	Eric Bell	19–2–3	7–1–1	1st	NCAA Round of 16
2022	Eric Bell	14–5–5	5–1–3	T-2nd	NCAA Round of 16
2023	Eric Bell	10–6–3	6–2–2	3rd	
2024	Eric Bell	17–4–2	9–0–2	1st	NCAA Second Round
2025	Eric Bell	18–3–3	9–1–1	1st	NCAA Semifinals
2026	Eric Bell	5–9–3	2–7–2	T-13th	
Eric Bell:		172–93–46	69–41–26		
Total:		380–347–78			
National champion Postseason invitational champion Conference regular season champion Conference regular season and conference tournament champion Division regular season champion Division regular season and conference tournament champion Conference tournament champion

== Current roster ==
As of August 2026

Note: Flags indicate national team as defined under FIFA eligibility rules; some limited exceptions apply. Players may hold more than one non-FIFA nationality.

No.	Pos.	Nation	Player
00	GK	USA	Claireese Foley
1	GK	USA	Olivia Geller
2	DF	ENG	Amelie Darey
3	MF	USA	Peyton Nourse
4	DF	USA	Zoe Cuneio
5	DF	ENG	Betsi Salihi
6	MF	USA	Kaela Martinez
10	MF	USA	Kamdyn Fuller
11	FW	USA	Bella Diorio
12	FW	USA	Madison Taylor
13	DF	USA	Leah Negeri
14	FW	USA	Hannah Harms
15	MF	USA	Mackenzie Hilderman

No.	Pos.	Nation	Player
16	DF	USA	Gianna Owens
17	DF	USA	Cameron Patton
18	MF	USA	Emma Yolinsky
19	MF	USA	Morgan Brown
20	FW	USA	Eres Freifeld
21	FW	USA	Makenzie Majors
22	MF	USA	Giovanna Costanzo
24	DF	USA	Cameron Byrd
27	MF	USA	Camille Banks
28	FW	USA	Emery Jean
30	DF	USA	Evie Baker
31	DF	USA	Camden Cosich
33	FW	USA	Grace Vest
99	GK	USA	Eliza Collings

== Awards ==
Player	Award	Season
Messiah Bright	Big 12 Freshman of the Year	2018
Marz Akins	Big 12 Freshman of the Year	2020
Emily Alvarado	Big 12 Goalkeeper of the Year	2020
Grace Collins	Big 12 Offensive Player of the Year	2020
Lauren Kellett	Big 12 Goalkeeper of the Year	2021
Brandi Peterson	Big 12 Defensive Player of the Year	2021
Grace Coppinger	Big 12 Freshman of the Year	2022
Bella Diorio	Big 12 Forward of the Year	2024
Oli Peña	Big 12 Midfielder of the Year	2024
Seven Castain	Big 12 Scholar-Athlete of the Year	2025
Kamdyn Fuller	Big 12 Freshman of the Year	2025

Coach	Award	Season
David Rubinson	WAC Mountain Division Coach of the Year	1997
Eric Bell	Big 12 Coach of the Year	2020
Eric Bell	Big 12 Coach of the Year	2021
Eric Bell	Big 12 Coach of the Year	2024
Eric Bell	Big 12 Coach of the Year	2025

=== All-SWC/WAC/MWC/C-USA Honors ===
Player	First team All-SWC
Angela Garrett	1995

Player	First team All-WAC
Sarah Suess	1996
Allison Calleri	1998
Jill Cook	1998
Jennifer Maunder	1999
Brenda DeRose	2000
Sherry Dick	2000

Player	First team All-MWC
Jordan Calhoun	2008
Jordan Calhoun	2010

Player	Second team All-WAC
Rachel Migliore	1996
Allison Calleri	1997
Jill Cook	1997
Christy Filice	1997
Nicole Kitagawa	1997
Carrie Walsh	1997
Brenda DeRose	1999

Player	Second team All-C-USA
Jessi Moore	2003
Jessi Moore	2004

Player	Second team All-MWC
Karissa Hill	2005
Angie Nickens	2007
Lizzy Karoly	2007
Lizzy Karoly	2008
Katie Taylor	2008
Jackie Torda	2009
Jordan Calhoun	2011

Player	Third team All-C-USA
Karissa Hill	2003
Amy Van Zandt	2003

=== All-Big 12 Honors ===
Player	First team All-Big 12
Bobbi Clemmer	2013
Bobbi Clemmer	2015
Emma Heckendorn	2016
Katie Lund	2017
Ryan Williams	2017
Yazmeen Ryan	2018
Messiah Bright	2019
Yazmeen Ryan	2019
Emily Alvarado	2020
Grace Collins	2020
Brandi Peterson	2020
Yazmeen Ryan	2020
Gracie Brian	2021
Messiah Bright	2021
Lauren Kellett	2021
Brandi Peterson	2021
Jenna Winebrenner	2021
Gracie Brian	2022
Messiah Bright	2022
Chaylyn Hubbard	2022
Camryn Lancaster	2022
Gracie Brian	2023
Seven Castain	2023
Morgan Brown	2024
Seven Castain	2024
Bella Diorio	2024
Caroline Kelly	2024
Maddie Mooney	2024
Oli Peña	2024
Morgan Brown	2025
Seven Castain	2025
Kamdyn Fuller	2025
Sydney Becerra	2025
Cameron Patton	2025

Player	Second team All-Big 12
Michelle Prokof	2013
Bobbi Clemmer	2014
Michelle Prokof	2015
Emma Heckendorn	2015
Michelle Prokof	2016
Yazmeen Ryan	2017
Messiah Bright	2018
Karitas Tomasdottir	2018
Messiah Bright	2020
Payton Crews	2021
Grace Collins	2021
Olivia Hasler	2022
Grace Coppinger	2023
Olivia Hasler	2023
Oli Peña	2023
Jennie Immethun	2024
Lauren Memoly	2024
Megan Plaschko	2024
Grace Coppinger	2025
AJ Hennessey	2025
Emma Yolinsky	2025

All-C-USA Freshman Honors

Player	C-USA All-Freshman Team
Laura Greenberg	2001
Ashley Fortune	2003

Note

- ‡ indicates player was Big 12 Newcomer of the Year
- † indicates player was Big 12 Freshman of the Year

All-Big 12 All-Newcomer/Freshman Honors

Player	Big 12 All-Newcomer/Freshman Team
Bobbi Clemmer	2012
Michelle Prokof	2013
Ryan Williams	2014
Cachet Lue	2016
Emily Alvarado	2017
Yazmeen Ryan	2017
Tijana Duricek	2017
Messiah Bright †	2018
Maddy Warren	2018
Gracie Brian	2019
Grace Collins	2019
Marz Akins †	2020
Olivia Hasler	2020
Brenna Brosam	2021
Camryn Lancaster	2021
Oli Peña	2021
Seven Castain	2021
Kennedy Clountz	2022
Grace Coppinger †	2022
Tyler Isgrig	2022
Morgan Brown	2024
Cameron Patton	2024
Kamdyn Fuller †	2025
Grace Vest	2025
Emma Yolinsky	2025

== Individual Records ==
Career Goals
Player	Years	Goals
Messiah Bright	2018–22	50
Seven Castain	2022–25	40
Jordan Calhoun	2008–11	36
Gracie Brian	2019–23	35
Michelle Prokof	2013–16	27
Lizzy Karoly	2006–09	27

Season Goals
Player	Year	Goals
Messiah Bright	2021	17
Seven Castain	2025	17
Jordan Calhoun	2008	15
Sarah Campbell	1986	14
Seven Castain	2024	13
Caroline Kelly	2024	13

Career Assists
Player	Years	Assists
Gracie Brian	2019–23	27
Yazmeen Ryan	2017–20	23
Camryn Lancaster	2021–24	22
Grace Collins	2019–21	22
Emma Heckendorn	2014–17	22

Season Assists
Player	Year	Assists
Grace Collins	2021	12
Camryn Lancaster	2021	12
Gracie Brian	2021	10
Oli Peña	2024	9
Yazmeen Ryan	2019	9
Emma Heckendorn	2016	9
Brandi Peterson	2021	9

Career Points
Player	Years	Points
Messiah Bright	2018–22	118
Gracie Brian	2019–23	97
Seven Castain	2022–25	95
Jordan Calhoun	2008–11	85
Sarah Campbell	1986–89	75

Season Points
Player	Year	Points
Messiah Bright	2021	40
Seven Castain	2025	38
Sarah Campbell	1986	34
Seven Castain	2024	32
Jordan Calhoun	2008	32

Career Saves
Player	Years	Saves
Maribeth Forrest	1987–90	490
Michelle Davies	1991–94	309
Kelsey Walters	2007–10	303
Vittoria Arnold	2012–14	248
Katy Buchanan	2003–06	232

Season Saves
Player	Year	Saves
Maribeth Forrest	1988	159
Maribeth Forrest	1989	157
Shannon Wagner	2000	116
Maribeth Forrest	1987	115
Vittoria Arnold	2012	105

== Notable alumni ==
=== Current professional players ===
*Last updated July 5, 2026

- (Mexico) Emily Alvarado (2017–2021) – Currently with FC Juárez
- (Mexico) Mónica Alvarado (2011–2012) – Currently with UNAM
- (Mexico) Sydney Becerra (2025) – Currently with Pachuca
- (United States) Messiah Bright (2018–2022) – Currently with Houston Dash
- (United States) Seven Castain (2022–2025) – Currently with Dallas Trinity (on loan from Orlando Pride)
- (United States) AJ Hennessey (2022–2025) – Currently with Sporting Club Jacksonville
- (United States) Lauren Kellett (2019–2023) – Currently with Grindavík/Njarðvík
- (United States) Caroline Kelly (2024) – Currently with Kansas City Current II
- (United States) Camryn Lancaster (2021–2024) – Currently with Dallas Trinity
- (United States) Katie Lund (2016–2018) – Currently with Chicago Stars FC
- (United States) Oli Peña (2021–2024) – Currently with North Carolina Courage
- (United States) Yazmeen Ryan (2017–2021) – Currently with Denver Summit FC
- (United States) Ryan Williams (2014–2017) – Currently with North Carolina Courage
