= Messiah Bright =

American soccer player (born 2000)

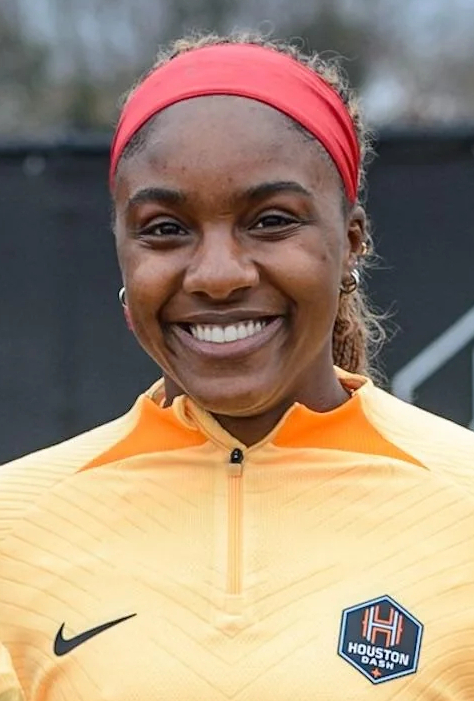
- Bright with the Houston Dash in 2025

Personal information
- Full name: Messiah Da'kahlian Bright
- Date of birth: January 12, 2000 (age 26)
- Place of birth: Dallas,Texas, U.S.
- Height: 5 ft 9 in (1.75 m)
- Position: Forward

Team information
- Current team: Houston Dash
- Number: 6

Youth career
- Solar SC

College career
Years	Team	Apps	(Gls)
2018–2022	TCU Horned Frogs	103	(50)

Senior career*
Years	Team	Apps	(Gls)
2023	Orlando Pride	22	(6)
2024	Angel City FC	21	(1)
2025–	Houston Dash	36	(3)

International career
2018	United States U18		
2022	United States U23		
- * Club domestic league appearances and goals as of 03:11, November 8, 2026 (UTC)

Messiah Da'kahlian Bright (born January 12, 2000) is an American professional soccer player who plays as a forward for the Houston Dash of the National Women's Soccer League (NWSL).

Bright played college soccer for the TCU Horned Frogs, for which she is the all-time top scorer. She was named the Big 12 Freshman of the Year in 2018 and first-team All-American in 2021. She was drafted by the Orlando Pride in the second round of the 2023 NWSL Draft.

== Early life and college career ==
Born in Dallas, Texas, Bright attended Cedar Hill High School. She scored 48 goals and 15 assists in her freshman and second years and was named District 8-6A Offensive MVP in 2016 before opting not to play high school soccer in her last two years. She played club soccer for Solar SC where she was a three-time Dallas Girls Cup champion. She was also a standout track and field athlete.

=== TCU Horned Frogs ===
Bright played five seasons of college soccer for the TCU Horned Frogs at Texas Christian University between 2018 and 2022 while studying for a bachelor's in strategic communication. In her first year, Bright was one of five players to start all 21 games and tied for the team lead with six goals. She was an All-Big 12 Conference Second Team honoree and named Big 12 Freshman of the Year, shared with Julia Grosso. Nationally, TopDrawerSoccer.com named her to the All-Freshman Second Team.

In 2019, Bright again started every TCU game and led the team with 12 goals as a sophomore. She was recognized as All-Big 12 First Team and Offensive MVP at the 2019 Big 12 Tournament. Having missed the opening two games of the season and a further two in October, Bright made a total of 12 appearances during the 2020–21 season which was shortened due to the COVID-19 pandemic. TCU won the regular season title for the first in program history. Despite being limited to nine regular season appearances, Bright scored three goals and was named All-Big 12 Second Team.

As a senior, Bright started all 24 games and set a new school single-season record for goals with 17. She played in all three matches during the 2021 Big 12 Tournament, scoring twice in a 3–0 win over the Texas Tech Red Raiders in the semi-final and another in the final before assisting the game-winner by Camryn Lancaster as TCU came from behind to beat the Texas Longhorns 2–1 to win the first tournament title in school history. The team had also retained their regular season title. She was named All-Big 12 First Team for a second time, the Big 12 Tournament Offensive MVP and also nationally recognized with United Soccer Coaches All-America First Team honors. Having accrued an additional year of eligibility following the COVID-19 impacted season, Bright did not declare for the 2022 NWSL Draft and returned to play a fifth season in 2022. She made 24 appearances, scoring 11 goals and four assists. TCU finished runners-up to the Texas Longhorns in the regular season and lost the tournament final to the West Virginia Mountaineers. Bright earned All-Big 12 First Team honors for a third time in five seasons and was All-America Second Team. In total, she made 103 career appearances (all starts) out of a possible 107 and set a new program record for all-time goals with 50 as well as adding 18 assists.

== Club career ==
=== Orlando Pride (2023) ===
On January 12, 2023, Bright was selected in the second round (21st overall) of the 2023 NWSL Draft by Orlando Pride. She was part of a record sized Big 12 draft class as five players were selected. Bright signed a three-year contract with Orlando on March 1, 2023. She made her debut on March 26, 2023, starting Orlando's 2023 season opener, a 4–0 defeat away to Portland Thorns FC. She was named NWSL player of the week on July 11 after scoring the only goal in a 1–0 win against OL Reign. She scored six goals in 22 regular season appearances and was one of three nominees for the NWSL Rookie of the Year award but lost out to Jenna Nighswonger.

=== Angel City FC (2024) ===
After only one season in Orlando, Bright requested a trade for personal reasons. On January 26, 2024, she was acquired by Angel City FC in exchange for $130,000 intra-league transfer funds. Bright made her debut for Angel City on March 17, 2024, as a substitute in the 2024 season opening match against Bay FC. Bright started her first match for Angel City a few days later on March 22, 2024, against her former club Orlando Pride. Bright recorded her first assist for Angel City on July 26, 2024, setting up Claire Emslie in a 2024 NWSL x Liga MX Femenil Summer Cup 2–0 away victory against Bay FC. Bright scored her first Angel City goal as well recorded her first professional hat-trick and the first hat-trick in Angel City's history on August 18, 2024, in a friendly against FC Juárez which finished as a 7–0 win, which is also the largest victory in club history.

=== Houston Dash (2025–present) ===
Bright with the Houston Dash in 2026

On January 27, 2025, Angel City traded Bright to the Houston Dash in exchange for $100,000 of intra-league transfer funds and an additional $50,000, pending performance-based incentives. In her first few months with the club, Bright appeared in 10 matches. She scored her first goal with the Dash on May 24, scoring an 84th-minute equalizer to rescue a draw against Bay FC. On June 4, she extended her contract with Houston through 2026, with a team option for an additional year.

== International career ==
In March 2018, Bright was called up to the United States under-18 squad for a training camp and friendlies against Switzerland under-19s in Köniz. In February 2022, Bright was named to the United States under-23 squad for the 2022 Thorns Invitational. She returned to the under-23s in June as part of a 21-player squad to travel to Sweden for the U23 Three Nations Tournament.

== Career statistics ==
=== College summary ===
Team	Season	Big 12 regular season			Big 12 Tournament		NCAA Tournament		Total	
Team	Season	Division	Apps	Goals	Apps	Goals	Apps	Goals	Apps	Goals
TCU Horned Frogs	2018	Div. I	18	5	1	0	2	1	21	6
TCU Horned Frogs	2019	Div. I	18	10	3	2	1	0	22	12
TCU Horned Frogs	2020–21	Div. I	9	3	—		3	1	12	4
TCU Horned Frogs	2021	Div. I	18	10	3	3	3	4	24	17
TCU Horned Frogs	2022	Div. I	18	9	3	2	3	0	24	11
Total			81	37	10	7	12	6	103	50

=== Club summary ===
As of November 2, 2025

Club	Season	League			Cup (Note: Includes NWSL Challenge Cup)		Playoffs (Note: Includes NWSL Playoffs)		Other		Total	
Club	Season	Division	Apps	Goals	Apps	Goals	Apps	Goals	Apps	Goals	Apps	Goals
Orlando Pride	2023	NWSL	22	6	6	1	—		—		28	7
Angel City FC	2024	NWSL	21	1	—		—		4 (Note: Includes NWSL x Liga MX Femenil Summer Cup)	0	25	1
Houston Dash	2025	NWSL	25	2	—		—		0	0	25	2
Career total			68	9	6	1	0	0	4	0	78	10

== Honors ==
TCU Horned Frogs

- Big 12 Conference regular season: 2020, 2021
- Big 12 Conference Tournament: 2021

Individual

- Big 12 Freshman of the Year: 2018
- United Soccer Coaches First Team All-America: 2021

Sporting positions
Preceded by (United States) Haley Berg (Texas)	Big 12 Freshman of the Year; 2018	Succeeded by (United States) Madison White (Texas Tech)
