= 2026 CAF Women's Champions League UNAF Qualifiers =

تصفيات إتحاد شمال إفريقيا المؤهلة لدوري أبطال إفريقيا للسيدات 2026

Tournament details
- Host country: Tunisia
- City: Tunis
- Dates: 1 – 7 September
- Teams: 4 (from 4 associations)
- Venues: 2

Final positions
- Champions: (Morocco) FUS Rabat (1st title)
- Runners-up: (Egypt) FC Masar
- Third place: (Algeria) CF Akbou
- Fourth place: (Tunisia) ASF Sousse

Tournament statistics
- Matches played: 6
- Goals scored: 32 (5.33 per match)
- Top scorer(s): (Kenya) Jentrix Shikangwa (4 goals)
- Best player: (Togo) Odette Gnintegma
- Best goalkeeper: (Morocco) Hasna Ouhat
- Fair play award: (Egypt) FC Masar
- All statistics correct as of 20 July 2026.

The 2026 CAF Women's Champions League UNAF Qualifiers will be the 6th edition of the CAF Women's Champions League UNAF Qualifiers tournament organised by the UNAF for the women's clubs of association nations. The tournament will be held in Tunisia from 31 August to 9 September 2026, to determine the UNAF representative in the 2026 CAF Women's Champions League final tournament.

== Participating teams ==
The following four teams contested in the qualifying tournament.

Team	Qualifying method	Appearances	Previous best performance
(Algeria) CF Akbou	2025–26 Algerian W-Championship champions	2nd	Third place (2024)
(Egypt) FC Masar	2025–26 Egyptian W-Premier League champions	3rd	Second place (2024, 2025)
(Morocco) FUS Rabat	2025–26 Moroccan W-Championship runners-up	1st	Debut
(Tunisia) ASF Sousse	2024–25 Tunisian W-Championship champions	4th	Fourth place (2023, 2024, 2025)

== Venues ==
2026 CAF Women's Champions League UNAF Qualifiers is located in Tunisia	Tunis	
2026 CAF Women's Champions League UNAF Qualifiers is located in Tunisia	Tunis-center (Belvédère)	Le Bardo
2026 CAF Women's Champions League UNAF Qualifiers is located in Tunisia	Chedly Zouiten Stadium	Hédi Enneifer Stadium
2026 CAF Women's Champions League UNAF Qualifiers is located in Tunisia	Capacity: 18,000	Capacity: 11,000

== Match officials ==
The following referees were chosen for the tournament.

=== Referees ===
- (Algeria) Dhikra Houia
- (Egypt) Rahma Youssef
- (Morocco) Sabah Sadir
- (Tunisia) Asma Chouchane

=== Assistant referees ===
- (Algeria) Loubna Ouchenane
- (Egypt) May Hassan
- (Egypt) Gamalat Shebl
- (Morocco) Karima Khadiri
- (Morocco) Ihsane Nouajli
- (Tunisia) Chefia Amri
- (Tunisia) Khouloud Amri

== Qualifying tournament ==
=== Standings ===
Pos	Team	Pld	W	D	L	GF	GA	GD	Pts	Qualification
1	(Morocco) FUS Rabat (C, Q)	3	3	0	0	14	1	+13	9	Main tournament
2	(Egypt) FC Masar	3	2	0	1	15	3	+12	6	
3	(Algeria) CF Akbou	3	1	0	2	3	9	−6	3	
4	(Tunisia) ASF Sousse (H)	3	0	0	3	0	19	−19	0	

Source: UNAF
(C) Champions; (H) Hosts; (Q) Qualified for the phase indicated

=== Matches ===
1 September 2026
16:00

FUS Rabat (Morocco)	4–0	(Algeria) CF Akbou
Gnintegma 18', 72'; Bouguerch 69'; Errakas 90+2'

Hédi Enneifer Stadium, Le Bardo
Referee: Rahma Youssef (Egypt)
1 September 2026
16:00

ASF Sousse (Tunisia)	0–9	(Egypt) FC Masar
		Hala Moustafa 14'; Yassmin Mohamed 23'; Shikangwa 25', 30'; Farah Hisham 38'; Mena Ezat 64'; Yara Sabry 67', 81'; Shahd Mohamed 90+3'

Chedly Zouiten Stadium, Tunis
Referee: Sabah Sadir (Morocco)

4 September 2026
16:00

CF Akbou (Algeria)	0–5	(Egypt) FC Masar
		Hala Moustafa 24'; Farah Said 30', 43'; Shikangwa 81', 90+4'

Hédi Enneifer Stadium, Le Bardo, Tunis
Referee: Asma Chouchane (Tunisia)
4 September 2026
16:00

FUS Rabat (Morocco)	7–0	(Tunisia) ASF Sousse
Gnintegma 15'; Gharrou 30'; Tammar 45', 54'; Fikri 66'; Houmaid 69'; Amani 82'

Chedly Zouiten Stadium, Tunis
Referee: Dhikra Houia (Algeria)

7 September 2026
16:00

FC Masar (Egypt)	1–3	(Morocco) FUS Rabat
Fatma-El-Zahraa Mohamed 34'		Tammar 5'; Ebula 55'; Bouguerch 88'

Hédi Enneifer Stadium, Le Bardo, Tunis
Referee: Asma Chouchane (Tunisia)
7 September 2026
16:00

ASF Sousse (Tunisia)	0–3	(Algeria) CF Akbou
		Ayadi 13'; Hamri 42'; Benkhellat 49'

Chedly Zouiten Stadium, Tunis
Referee: Rahma Youssef (Egypt)

== Statistics ==
=== Goalscorers ===
There have been 32 goals scored in 6 matches, for an average of 5.33 goals per match.

Rank	Player	Team	Goals
1	(Kenya) Jentrix Shikangwa	(Egypt) FC Masar	4
2	(Morocco) Salma Tammar	(Morocco) FUS Rabat	3
2	(Togo) Odette Gnintegma	(Morocco) FUS Rabat	3
4	(Egypt) Hala Moustafa	(Egypt) FC Masar	2
4	(Egypt) Yara Sabry	(Egypt) FC Masar	2
4	(Egypt) Farah Said	(Egypt) FC Masar	2
4	(Morocco) Salma Bouguerch	(Morocco) FUS Rabat	2
7	(Algeria) Ghania Ayadi	(Algeria) CF Akbou	1
7	(Algeria) Dyhia Benkhellat	(Algeria) CF Akbou	1
7	(Algeria) Wafaa Hamri	(Algeria) CF Akbou	1
7	(Egypt) Mena Ezat	(Egypt) FC Masar	1
7	(Egypt) Farah Hisham	(Egypt) FC Masar	1
7	(Egypt) Fatma-El-Zahraa Mohamed	(Egypt) FC Masar	1
7	(Egypt) Shahd Mohamed	(Egypt) FC Masar	1
7	(Egypt) Yassmin Mohamed	(Egypt) FC Masar	1
7	(Equatorial Guinea) Mari Cruz Ebula	(Morocco) FUS Rabat	1
7	(Morocco) Salma Amani	(Morocco) FUS Rabat	1
7	(Morocco) Hajar Errakas	(Morocco) FUS Rabat	1
7	(Morocco) Samia Fikri	(Morocco) FUS Rabat	1
7	(Morocco) Assala Gharrou	(Morocco) FUS Rabat	1
7	(Morocco) Hafsa Houmaid	(Morocco) FUS Rabat	1

== Broadcasting rights ==
Territory	Broadcaster	Ref.
North Africa	UNAF YouTube Channel	
