= Fath Union Sport (women) =

Women's football club in Rabat

FUS Rabat
- Full name: Fath Union Sport
- Stadium: Training Center Faith Union Sport
- Capacity: 1,000
- Head Coach: Mehdi El Qaichouri
- League: Moroccan Women's Championship
- 2024–25: D1, 4th of 14
- Website: fus.ma
Home colours	Away colours

Fath Union Sport (Arabic: إتحاد الفتح الرياضي), commonly known as FUS Rabat féminines or shortly as FUS, is the women's football section of the Botola Pro professional club FUS Rabat. that competes in the Moroccan Women's Championship, The highest division in the Moroccan football league system.

== History ==
In January 2021, the team played its first match in the Second Division against CS Hilal Temara. It wasn't until the fourth round that Fath secured their first victory, an 11–2 triumph over Amal El Massira.

In March 2022, the club secured promotion to the Pro Division for the first time in its history with eight rounds remaining in the season, following a dominant league campaign.

In September 2026, the club won its first UNAF Champions League, Thus qualifying for the 2026 CAF Women's Champions League.

== Performance in CAF competitions ==
- CAF Women's Champions League: 1 appearance

2026 – Group stage

== Players and Staff ==
=== Current squad ===
As of 1 November 2026

Note: Flags indicate national team as defined under FIFA eligibility rules; some limited exceptions apply. Players may hold more than one non-FIFA nationality.

No.	Pos.	Nation	Player
1	GK	MAR	Hasnae Ouhatte
2	DF	MAR	Alya El Majidi
3	DF	MAR	Doha Razki
4	DF	MAR	Maryame Atiq (C)
5	FW	MAR	Ouafae Laguedem
6	MF	GUI	Aminata Camara
7	FW	MAR	Hajar Errakkas
8	MF	TOG	Odette Gnintegma
9	FW	MAR	Hafsa Houmaid
10	MF	MAR	Assala Gharrou
11	FW	GEQ	Mari Cruz Ebula

No.	Pos.	Nation	Player
12	GK	MAR	Ahlam Boukhorb
14	MF	MAR	Samia Fikri
16	MF	MAR	Salma Tammar
17	FW	MAR	Salma Amani
19	FW	MAR	Alia Jaidi
20	DF	MAR	Chaimae El-Ammari
21	MF	MAR	Nour Hamdaoui
22	FW	MLI	Kadidiatou Diabaté
23	MF	MAR	Salma Bouguerch
26	GK	MAR	Chaimae Chaouni

=== Current staff ===
Coaching staff
Head coach	(Morocco) Mehdi El Qaichouri
Assistant coach	

== Honours ==
=== Domestic ===
- Moroccan Women's Championship

Runners-up (1): 2025–26

- Moroccan Women's Championship D2

Winners (1): 2022

=== Continental ===
- UNAF Women's Champions League

Winners (1): 2026
