= 2024 CAF Women's Champions League UNAF Qualifiers =

تصفيات إتحاد شمال إفريقيا المؤهلة لدوري أبطال إفريقيا للسيدات 2024

Tournament details
- Host country: Algeria
- Cities: Algiers, Blida
- Dates: 22–30 August
- Teams: 4 (from 4 associations)

Final positions
- Champions: (Morocco) AS FAR (2nd title)
- Runners-up: (Egypt) Tutankhamun
- Third place: (Algeria) CF Akbou
- Fourth place: (Tunisia) ASF Sousse

Tournament statistics
- Matches played: 6
- Goals scored: 28 (4.67 per match)
- Top scorer(s): (Burundi) Sandrine Niyonkuru (5 goals)

The 2024 CAF Women's Champions League UNAF Qualifiers was the 4th edition of the CAF Women's Champions League UNAF Qualifiers tournament organised by the UNAF for the women's clubs of association nations. The tournament was held in Algeria from 22 to 30 August 2024, to determine the UNAF representative in the 2024 CAF Women's Champions League final tournament.

AS FAR won the tournament and qualified for the main competition for the fourth consecutive time in their history. However, following the announcement that Morocco would host the finals, the runners-up of the UNAF qualifiers, FC Masar (who were known as Tutankhamun during the qualifiers), were granted a place in the finals, as AS FAR also won the Moroccan Women's Championship and automatically qualified as hosts.

== Participating teams ==
The following four teams contested in the qualifying tournament. The draw took place on Wednesday, 24 July 2024 in Cairo, Egypt.

Team	Qualifying method	Appearances	Previous best performance
(Algeria) CF Akbou	2023–24 Algerian Women's champions	1st	Debut
(Egypt) Tutankhamun	2024 Egyptian League champions	1st	Debut
(Morocco) AS FAR	2023–24 Moroccan Women's champions	2nd	First place (2021)
(Tunisia) ASF Sousse	2023–24 Tunisian Women's champions	2nd	Fourth place (2023)

== Venues ==
As of the last edition of the 2023 CAF Women's Champions League UNAF Qualifiers, the Miloud Hadefi Stadium in Oran, Algeria was shosen on first to hosts the qualifying tournament. But on 1 July 2024, the Algerian Football Federation (FAF) decided changing the venue to Algiers. It's the second time when Oran was shosen but not organize the event, the first one was in the 2023 edition.

2024 CAF Women's Champions League UNAF Qualifiers is located in Algeria	Rouïba, Algiers	Blida
2024 CAF Women's Champions League UNAF Qualifiers is located in Algeria	Salem Mabrouki Stadium	Mustapha Tchaker Stadium
2024 CAF Women's Champions League UNAF Qualifiers is located in Algeria	Capacity: 12,000	Capacity: 25,000

== Match officials ==
The following referees were chosen for the tournament.

=== Referees ===
- (Algeria) Ghada Mehat
- (Egypt) Noura Samir Elsayed
- (Morocco) Zoulaikha Harmasse
- (Tunisia) Dorsaf Ganouati

=== Assistant referees ===
- (Algeria) Sara Belmadi
- (Algeria) Sara Kemmad
- (Egypt) Yara Atef Abdelfattah
- (Egypt) Gamalat Ahmed Shibl
- (Morocco) Karima Khadiri
- (Morocco) Ihssane Ennouajeli
- (Tunisia) Houda Afin
- (Tunisia) Khouloud Lamiri

== Qualifying tournament ==
=== Standings ===
Pos	Team	Pld	W	D	L	GF	GA	GD	Pts	Qualification	FAR	TUT	CFA	ASF
1	(Morocco) AS FAR	3	3	0	0	10	0	+10	9	Main tournament (Note: FC Masar, who were known as Tutankhamun during the qualifiers, qualified to the finals on 15 October 2024, as the qualifiers winners AS FAR also won the Moroccan Women's Championship and automatically qualified as hosts.)	—	1–0	4–0	
2	(Egypt) Tutankhamun	3	2	0	1	11	3	+8	6	Main tournament		—	4–2	
3	(Algeria) CF Akbou (H)	3	1	0	2	6	9	−3	3				—	4–1
4	(Tunisia) ASF Sousse	3	0	0	3	1	16	−15	0		0–5	0–7		—

Source: UNAF
(H) Hosts

=== Matches ===
24 August 2024
17:00

AS FAR (Morocco)	4–0	(Algeria) CF Akbou
Mssoudy 23'; Gómez 47'; Banouk 79'; Ahmamou 90+3'	Report (CAF)

Salem Mabrouki Stadium, Rouïba
Referee: Noura Elsayed (Egypt)
24 August 2024
20:00

ASF Sousse (Tunisia)	0–7	(Egypt) Tutankhamun
	Report (CAF)	Ubamba 15'; H. Moustafa 17', 22'; A. Mohamed 54'; Niyonkuru 63' (pen.); El Mahdy 74'; A. Tarek 90+4'

Salem Mabrouki Stadium, Rouïba
Referee: Zoulaikha Harmasse (Morocco)

27 August 2024
17:00

ASF Sousse (Tunisia)	0–5	(Morocco) AS FAR
		Banouk 34', 89', 90+4'; Mssoudy 57'; Badri 68'

Salem Mabrouki Stadium, Rouïba
Referee: Ghada Mehat (Algeria)
27 August 2024
20:00

Tutankhamun (Egypt)	4–2	(Algeria) CF Akbou
Niyonkuru 45', 59', 62', 90+4'		Benaichouche 55'; Ournani 68'

Salem Mabrouki Stadium, Rouïba
Referee: Dorsaf Ganouati (Tunisia)

30 August 2024
18:00

CF Akbou (Algeria)	4–1	(Tunisia) ASF Sousse
Bahri 18'; Lamari 21'; Alouache 44'; Benaichouche 71'		Mejri 50'

Mustapha Tchaker Stadium, Blida
Referee: Zoulaikha Harmasse (Morocco)
30 August 2024
18:00

AS FAR (Morocco)	1–0	(Egypt) Tutankhamun
Badri 29'

Salem Mabrouki Stadium, Rouïba
Referee: Dorsaf Ganouati (Tunisia)

== Statistics ==
=== Goalscorers ===
There have been 28 goals scored in 6 matches, for an average of 4.67 goals per match.

Rank	Player	Team	Goals
1	(Burundi) Sandrine Niyonkuru	(Egypt) Tutankhamun	5
2	(Morocco) Safa Banouk	(Morocco) AS FAR	4
3	(Algeria) Rahma Benaichouche	(Algeria) CF Akbou	2
3	(Egypt) Hala Moustafa	(Egypt) Tutankhamun	2
3	(Morocco) Najat Badri	(Morocco) AS FAR	2
3	(Morocco) Sanaâ Mssoudy	(Morocco) AS FAR	2
7	(Algeria) Wassila Alouache	(Algeria) CF Akbou	1
7	(Algeria) Ikram Bahri	(Algeria) CF Akbou	1
7	(Algeria) Naïma Lamari	(Algeria) CF Akbou	1
7	(Algeria) Khouloud Ournani	(Algeria) CF Akbou	1
7	(Egypt) Farah El Mahdy	(Egypt) Tutankhamun	1
7	(Egypt) Amira Mohamed	(Egypt) Tutankhamun	1
7	(Egypt) Ahd Tarek	(Egypt) Tutankhamun	1
7	(Tanzania) Hasnath Ubamba	(Egypt) Tutankhamun	1
7	(Guatemala) Savianna Gómez	(Morocco) AS FAR	1
7	(Morocco) Douha Ahmamou	(Morocco) AS FAR	1
7	(Tunisia) Eya Mejri	(Tunisia) ASF Sousse	1

== Broadcasting rights ==
Territory	Broadcaster	Ref.
North Africa	UNAF YouTube Channel	
