= 2019 NCAA Division I women's soccer rankings =

- Season: 2019
- NCAA tournament: 2019
- Preseason No. 1: Florida State (Unanimous)
- NCAA Tournament Champions: Stanford
NCAA Division I women's soccer rankings


Three polls make up the 2019 NCAA Division I women's soccer rankings, the United Soccer Coaches Poll, the Soccer America Poll, and the Top Drawer Soccer Poll. They represent the ranking system for the 2019 NCAA Division I women's soccer season.

== Legend ==
	Increase in ranking
	Decrease in ranking
	Not ranked previous week
Italics	Number of first place votes
(#–#–#)	Win–loss–tie record
т	Tied with team above or below also with this symbol

== United Soccer Coaches ==
	Preseason Aug 6	Week 1 Aug 27	Week 2 Sep 3	Week 3 Sep 10	Week 4 Sep 17	Week 5 Sep 24	Week 6 Oct 1	Week 7 Oct 8	Week 8 Oct 15	Week 9 Oct 22	Week 10 Oct 29	Week 11 Nov 5	Week 12 Nov 12	Final Dec 10	
1.	Florida State (33)	Florida State (26) (2–0–0)	North Carolina (24) (4–0–0)	North Carolina (29) (6–0–0)	Virginia (21) (8–0–0)	Virginia (28) (8–0–1)	Virginia (22) (9–0–2)	Virginia (22) (10–0–2)	Virginia (19) (11–0–3)	Virginia (24) (12–0–3)	Virginia (26) (14–0–3)	Virginia (27) (15–0–3)	Stanford (25) (18–1–0)	Stanford (29) (24–1–0)	1.
2.	North Carolina	North Carolina (2–0–0)	UCLA (8) (4–0–0)	Stanford (4) (5–0–0)	USC (10) (7–0–0)	Stanford (4) (7–1–0)	Stanford (7) (8–1–0)	Stanford (8) (10–1–0)	Stanford (14) (12–1–0)	Stanford (10) (13–1–0)	Stanford (8) (15–1–0)	Stanford (6) (17–1–0)	North Carolina (8) (19–1–1)	North Carolina (1) (24–1–2)	2.
3.	Stanford (1)	Stanford (5) (2–0–0)	Stanford (2) (4–0–0)	USC (1) (6–0–0)	Stanford (3) (6–1–0)	USC (7–0–1)	North Carolina (2) (10–1–0)	North Carolina (3) (11–1–0)	North Carolina (1) (12–1–1)	North Carolina (13–1–1)	North Carolina (15–1–1)	North Carolina (17–1–1)	Virginia (16–1–3)	UCLA (2) (18–5–1)	3.
4.	UCLA	UCLA (3) (2–0–0)	USC (3–0–1)	Virginia (6–0–0)	North Carolina (7–1–0)	North Carolina (8–1–0)	BYU (2) (10–0–0)	USC (1) (9–1–1)	USC (11–1–1)	BYU (13–0–1)	BYU (15–0–1)	BYU (1) (16–0–1)	BYU (18–0–1)	Washington State (2) (16–7–1)	4.
5.	USC	USC (2–0–0)	Virginia (4–0–0)	UCLA (4–1–0)	UCLA (5–1–0)	BYU (2) (8–0–0)	USC (1) (7–1–1)	Florida State (10–2–0)	BYU (12–0–1)	Florida State (12–3–0)	Florida State (13–4–0)	Florida State (15–4–0)	South Carolina (1) (16–1–3)	BYU (21–1–1)	5.
6.	Penn State (1)	Virginia (2–0–0)	Florida State (2–2–0)	Florida State (4–2–0)	Florida State (6–2–0)	Florida State (7–2–0)	Florida State (9–2–0)	BYU (10–0–1)	Florida State (11–3–0)	Arkansas (12–2–1)	Arkansas (13–2–2)	Arkansas (14–2–2)	Florida State (15–5–0)	South Carolina (19–2–3)	6.
7.	Georgetown	Penn State (1–1–0)	South Carolina (3–0–0)	South Carolina (5–0–0)	BYU (6–0–0)	UCLA (6–1–1)	South Carolina (9–1–0)	South Carolina (10–1–0)	South Carolina (11–1–1)	USC (11–2–1)	Wisconsin (13–2–2)	South Carolina (13–1–3)	UCLA (14–4–1)	Florida State (18–6–0)	7.
8.	Duke	South Carolina (2–0–0)	Penn State (3–1–0)	Penn State (4–1–1)	Duke (5–1–1)	South Carolina (7–1–0)	Clemson (8–1–1)	Memphis (12–1–0)	Arkansas (11–2–1)	South Carolina (11–1–2)	South Carolina (12–1–3)	Memphis (16–1–1)	Arkansas (16–3–2)	USC (17–5–1)	8.
9.	Virginia	Vanderbilt (2–0–0)	Vanderbilt (4–0–0)	Vanderbilt (6–0–0)	South Carolina (6–1–0)	Clemson (7–0–1)	Memphis (10–1–0)	Clemson (8–2–1)	Duke (7–1–5)	Duke (7–1–6)	Duke (8–1–7)	USC (14–3–1)	USC (14–4–1)	Virginia (17–2–3)	9.
10.	Tennessee	Duke (1–1–0)	BYU (3–0–0)	BYU (4–0–0)	Clemson (6–0–1)	Duke (5–1–2)	Duke (6–1–3)	Georgetown (9–2–1)	Wisconsin (10–2–1)	Wisconsin (11–2–2)	Memphis (15–1–1)	Oklahoma State (15–1–3)	Wisconsin (14–3–2)	Wisconsin (16–4–2)	10.
11.	West Virginia	Tennessee (2–0–0)	Kansas (4–0–0)	Duke (4–1–1)	Memphis (7–1–0)	Memphis (8–1–0)	Georegetown (7–2–1)	Duke (6–1–4)	Georgetown (10–2–2)	Memphis (13–1–1)	USC (12–3–1)	Wisconsin (14–3–2)	Kansas (15–4–3)	Kansas (17–5–3)	11.
12.	Texas A&M	West Virginia (1–1–0)	Duke (2–1–1)	Texas A&M (4–0–2)	Georgetown (5–2–1)	Georgetown (6–2–1)	Texas A&M (9–1–2)	Wisconsin (9–2–1)	Memphis (13–1–1)	Louisville (11–1–2)	Oklahoma State (13–1–3)	Duke (8–3–7)	Duke (8–3–7)	Arkansas (17–4–2)	12.
13.	Santa Clara	Georgetown (1–1–0)	Texas A&M (3–0–1)	Washington State (4–0–0)	Rutgers (6–0–1)	Arkansas (7–1–1)	Wisconsin (7–2–1)	Arkansas (9–2–1)	Texas Tech (11–1–2)	Oklahoma State (12–1–3)	UCLA (11–4–1)	Texas Tech (15–2–2)	Oklahoma State (15–2–3)	Penn State (17–7–1)	13.
14.	Baylor	BYU (2–0–0)	NC State (2–1–0)	Memphis (5–1–0)	Kansas (7–1–0)	Texas A&M (7–1–1)	Washington State (8–1–0)	Texas Tech (10–1–1)	Louisville (11–1–1)	Georgetown (10–2–3)	Louisville (12–2–2)	UCLA (13–4–1)	Memphis (17–2–1)	Santa Clara (15–6–2)	14.
15.	South Carolina	Wisconsin (1–1–0)	Georgetown (2–1–1)	Georgetown (3–2–1)	Texas A&M (5–1–2)	Vanderbilt (8–1–0)	Arkansas (8–2–1)	Washington State (9–2–0)	Oklahoma State (10–1–3)	Clemson (9–4–1)	Texas Tech (13–2–2)	Rutgers (15–2–2)	Texas Tech (15–3–2)	Michigan (17–6–1)	15.
16.	Wisconsin	Texas A&M (1–0–1)	Wisconsin (3–1–0)	Virginia Tech (6–0–0)	Arkansas (6–1–1)	Virginia Tech (9–0–0)	UCLA (6–2–1)	Louisville (10–1–0)	UCLA (9–3–1)	Michigan (12–3–1)	Rutgers (14–2–2)	Texas A&M (13–3–3)	Brown (14–1–2)	South Florida (16–5–0)	16.
17.	Vanderbilt	NC State (1–1–0)	Washington State (3–0–0)	TCU (5–1–0)	Vanderbilt (7–1–0)	Kansas (8–2–0)	Colorado (9–1–0)	Texas A&M (9–2–2)	Clemson (8–4–1)	Texas Tech (11–2–2)	Texas A&M (12–3–3)	Brown (13–1–1)	South Florida (14–4–0)	NC State (12–7–4)	17.
18.	South Florida	Kansas (2–0–0)	Memphis (3–1–0)	Kansas (5–1–0)	Virginia Tech (8–0–0)	Oklahoma State (7–0–2)	Texas Tech (9–1–1)	Oklahoma State (9–1–3)	Texas A&M (10–2–3)	UCLA (9–4–1)	Brown (12–1–1)	Georgetown (12–3–3)	Penn State (15–6–1)	Duke (9–4–7)	18.
19.	Texas	Santa Clara (1–1–0)	Clemson (4–0–0)	Rutgers (5–0–1)	Iowa (8–0–0)	Wisconsin (6–2–1)	Louisville (9–1–0)	Florida (8–4–0)	Michigan (11–3–1)	Washington State (10–3–1)	Georgetown (11–3–3)	Michigan (14–4–1)	Michigan (15–5–1)	Oklahoma State (16–3–3)	19.
20.	Memphis	Memphis (2–0–0)	Tennessee (3–1–0)	Clemson (5–0–1)	Louisville (7–0–0)	Rutgers (7–1–1)	California (9–1–0)	Virginia Tech (9–2–1)	Santa Clara (8–5–1)	Florida (10–5–0)	Michigan (13–4–1)	Santa Clara (11–5–2)	Santa Clara (13–5–2)	Texas Tech (15–4–3)	20.
21.	NC State	Baylor (1–0–0)	Rutgers (4–0–0)	Tennessee (5–1–0)	California (7–0–0)	Washington State (7–1–0)	Kansas (9–3–0)	Rutgers (9–2–1)	UCF (8–2–2)	Rutgers (12–2–2)	Washington (10–4–2)	Kansas (13–4–3)	Rutgers (15–3–2)	Memphis (17–3–1)	21.
22.	Texas Tech	Pepperdine (1–0–1)	West Virginia (2–2–0)	Wisconsin (4–1–1)	South Florida (5–1–0)	Louisville (7–1–0)	SMU (7–1–1)	UCLA (7–3–1)	Rutgers (10–2–2)	Texas A&M (10–3–3)	Clemson (10–5–1)	Louisville (12–4–2)	Texas A&M (13–4–3)	Texas A&M (14–5–3)	22.
23.	Wake Forest	Washington State (1–0–0)	Virginia Tech (4–0–0)	West Virginia (2–2–1)	Penn State (4–3–1)	SMU (7–1–1)	Virginia Tech (9–2–0)	UCF (8–2–2)	Kansas (10–4–1)	Kansas (11–4–1)	Santa Clara (10–5–2)	NC State (10–5–4)	Louisville (12–4–2)	Brown (14–2–3)	23.
24.	LSU	Texas (1–0–0)	TCU (3–1–0)	Colorado (6–0–0)	Washington State (5–1–0)	Colorado (8–1–0)	Michigan (8–2–1)	Santa Clara (6–5–1)	Florida (9–5–0)	Brown (10–1–1)	South Florida (12–3–0)	Washington State (12–5–1)	Xavier (16–3–2)	Xavier (17–4–2)	24.
25.	Virginia Tech	Southern Methodist (2–0–0)	Wake Forest (4–0–0)	South Florida (4–1–0)	Oklahoma State (6–0–1)	Texas Tech (8–1–0)	Oklahoma State (7–1–3)	Arizona (7–3–0)	Washington (8–3–2)	Virginia Tech (10–3–2)	Kansas (11–4–3)	Clemson (11–6–1)	Georgetown (13–4–3)	Louisville (13–5–3)	25.
	Preseason Aug 6	Week 1 Aug 27	Week 2 Sep 3	Week 3 Sep 10	Week 4 Sep 17	Week 5 Sep 24	Week 6 Oct 1	Week 7 Oct 8	Week 8 Oct 15	Week 9 Oct 22	Week 10 Oct 29	Week 11 Nov 5	Week 12 Nov 12	Final Dec 10	
		Dropped: No. 18 South Florida; No. 22 Texas Tech; No. 23 Wake Forest; No. 24 LSU; No. 25 Virginia Tech	Dropped: No. 19 Santa Clara; No. 21 Baylor; No. 22 Pepperdine; No. 24 Texas; No. 25 Southern Methodist	Dropped: No. 14 NC State; No. 25 Wake Forest	Dropped: No. 17 TCU; No. 21 Tennessee; No. 22 Wisconsin; No. 23 West Virginia; No. 24 Colorado	Dropped: No. 19 Iowa; No. 21 California; No. 22 South Florida; No. 23 Penn State	Dropped: No. 15 Vanderbilt; No. 20 Rutgers	Dropped: No. 17 Colorado; No. 20 California; No. 21 Kansas; No. 22 SMU; No. 24 Michigan	Dropped: No. 15 Washington State; No. 20 Virginia Tech; No. 25 Arizona	Dropped: No. 20 Santa Clara; No. 21 UCF; No. 25 Washington	Dropped: No. 19 Washington State; No. 20 Florida; No. 25 Virginia Tech	Dropped: No. 21 Washington; No. 24 South Florida	Dropped: No. 23 NC State; No. 24 Washington State; No. 25 Clemson	Dropped: No. 21 Rutgers; No. 25 Georgetown	

== Soccer America ==
	Preseason Aug. 20	Week 1 Aug. 27	Week 2 Sep. 3	Week 3 Sep. 10	Week 4 Sep. 17	Week 5 Sep. 24	Week 6 Oct. 1	Week 7 Oct. 8	Week 8 Oct. 15	Week 9 Oct. 22	Week 10 Oct. 29	Week 11 Nov. 5	Final Nov. 12	
1.	Florida State	Florida State (2–0–0)	Stanford (4–0–0)	Stanford (5–0–0)	USC (7–0–0)	USC (7–0–1)	Stanford (8–1–0)	Stanford (10–1–0)	Stanford (12–1–0)	Stanford (13–1–0)	Stanford (15–1–0)	Stanford (17–1–0)	Stanford (18–1–0)	1.
2.	Stanford	Stanford (2–0–0)	UCLA (4–0–0)	North Carolina (6–0–0)	Virginia (8–0–0)	Virginia (8–0–1)	Virginia (9–0–2)	Virginia (10–0–2)	Virginia (11–0–3)	Virginia (12–0–3)	Virginia (14–0–3)	Virginia (15–0–3)	North Carolina (19–1–1)	2.
3.	UCLA	UCLA (2–0–0)	North Carolina (4–0–0)	USC (6–0–0)	UCLA (5–1–0)	UCLA (6–1–1)	USC (7–1–1)	USC (9–1–1)	USC (11–1–1)	North Carolina (13–1–1)	North Carolina (15–1–1)	North Carolina (17–1–1)	Virginia (15–1–3)	3.
4.	North Carolina	North Carolina (2–0–0)	USC (4–0–0)	Virginia (6–0–0)	Stanford (6–1–0)	Stanford (7–1–0)	North Carolina (10–1–0)	North Carolina (11–1–0)	North Carolina (12–1–0)	Florida State (12–3–0)	BYU (15–0–1)	BYU (16–0–1)	BYU (18–0–1)	4.
5.	USC	USC (2–0–0)	Virginia (4–0–0)	UCLA (4–1–0)	North Carolina (7–1–0)	North Carolina (8–1–0)	Florida State (9–2–0)	Florida State (10–2–0)	Florida State (11–3–0)	BYU (13–0–1)	South Carolina (12–1–3)	South Carolina (13–1–3)	South Carolina (16–1–3)	5.
6.	Penn State	Virginia (2–0–0)	Florida State (2–2–0)	Florida State (4–2–0)	Florida State (6–2–0)	Florida State (7–2–0)	BYU (10–0–0)	South Carolina (10–1–0)	BYU (12–0–1)	USC (11–2–1)	Arkansas (13–2–2)	Arkansas (14–2–2)	Arkansas (16–3–2)	6.
7.	Georgetown	Penn State (1–1–0)	Penn State (3–1–0)	Vanderbilt (6–0–0)	Clemson (6–0–1)	Clemson (7–0–1)	Duke (6–1–3)	BYU (10–0–1)	South Carolina (11–1–1)	South Carolina (11–1–2)	Florida State (13–4–0)	Florida State (15–4–0)	UCLA (14–4–1)	7.
8.	Virginia	Texas A&M (1–0–1)	Texas A&M (3–1–0)	South Carolina (5–0–0)	Duke (5–1–1)	BYU (8–0–0)	California (9–1–0)	Duke (6–1–4)	Arkansas (11–2–1)	Arkansas (12–2–1)	USC (12–3–1)	Memphis (16–1–1)	Florida State (15–5–0)	8.
9.	Santa Clara	Baylor (1–0–0)	Vanderbilt (4–0–0)	Penn State (4–1–1)	BYU (5–0–0)	Duke (5–1–2)	UCLA (6–2–1)	Georgetown (9–2–1)	Duke (7–1–5)	Duke (7–1–6)	Wisconsin (13–2–2)	Oklahoma State (15–1–3)	Kansas (15–4–3)	9.
10.	Texas A&M	Vanderbilt (2–0–0)	South Carolina (3–0–0)	Texas A&M (4–0–2)	Rutgers (6–0–1)	Arkansas (7–1–1)	Clemson (8–1–1)	Louisville (10–1–0)	Georgetown (10–2–2)	Georgetown (10–2–3)	Duke (8–1–7)	Rutgers (15–2–2)	Penn State (16–6–1)	10.
11.	Baylor	Tennessee (2–0–0)	Rutgers (4–0–0)	Rutgers (5–0–1)	Iowa (8–0–0)	Vanderbilt (8–1–0)	South Carolina (9–1–0)	Arkansas (9–2–1)	Louisville (11–1–1)	Louisville (11–1–2)	Memphis (15–1–1)	USC (13–4–1)	Xavier (16–3–2)	11.
12.	Duke	South Carolina (2–0–0)	Clemson (4–0–0)	Clemson (5–0–1)	Louisville (8–0–0)	South Carolina (7–1–0)	Texas A&M (9–1–2)	Texas Tech (10–1–1)	Texas Tech (11–1–2)	Wisconsin (11–2–2)	Oklahoma State (13–1–3)	Texas Tech (15–2–2)	USF (14–4–0)	12.
13.	Vanderbilt	Santa Clara (1–1–0)	Baylor (2–0–1)	Wake Forest (5–0–1)	Arkansas (6–1–1)	Texas A&M (7–1–2)	Georgetown (7–2–1)	Wisconsin (9–2–1)	Wisconsin (10–2–1)	Florida (10–5–0)	Rutgers (14–2–2)	UCLA (13–4–1)	Memphis (17–2–1)	13.
14.	West Virginia	Duke (1–1–0)	Wake Forest (4–0–0)	Tennessee (5–1–0)	Oklahoma State (6–0–1)	Virginia Tech (9–0–0)	Colorado (9–1–0)	Memphis (12–1–0)	Memphis (13–1–1)	Memphis (13–1–1)	USF (12–3–0)	Texas A&M (13–3–3)	Oklahoma State (15–2–3)	14.
15.	South Florida	West Virginia (1–1–0)	Tennessee (3–1–0)	Duke (4–1–1)	Tennessee (5–1–1)	Georgetown (6–2–1)	Louisville (9–1–0)	UCLA (7–3–1)	UCLA (9–3–1)	Vanderbilt (11–3–1)	Texas Tech (13–2–2)	Georgetown (12–3–3)	Rutgers (15–3–2)	15.
16.	Tennessee	Texas (1–0–0)	Duke (2–1–1)	Washington State (4–0–0)	Vanderbilt (7–1–0)	Colorado (8–1–0)	Arkansas (8–2–1)	Florida (8–4–0)	Florida (9–5–0)	Oklahoma State (12–1–3)	UCLA (11–4–1)	Wisconsin (14–3–2)	USC (14–4–1)	16.
17.	Texas	Rutgers (2–0–0)	West Virginia (2–2–0)	Colorado (6–0–0)	South Carolina (6–1–0)	Louisville (7–1–0)	Texas Tech (9–1–1)	Clemson (8–2–1)	Texas A&M (10–2–3)	Michigan (12–3–1)	Texas A&M (12–3–3)	California (13–3–3)	Texas Tech (15–3–2)	17.
18.	Rutgers	Clemson (2–0–0)	Georgetown (2–1–1)	BYU (4–0–0)	Texas A&M (5–1–2)	Oklahoma State (7–0–2)	Wisconsin (7–2–1)	Texas A&M (9–2–2)	Vanderbilt (10–3–1)	Rutgers (12–2–2)	Georgetown (11–3–3)	Brown (13–1–1)	Texas A&M (13–4–3)	18.
19.	South Carolina	Florida (2–0–0)	NC State (2–1–0)	West Virginia (2–2–1)	Virginia Tech (8–0–0)	Tennessee (6–2–1)	Memphis (10–1–0)	Vanderbilt (9–3–0)	Oklahoma State (10–1–3)	California (10–3–2)	Louisville (12–2–2)	Vanderbilt (14–4–1)	Georgetown (13–4–3)	19.
20.	Texas Tech	NC State (1–1–0)	Washington State (3–0–0)	Iowa (6–0–0)	Gerogetown (5–2–1)	Texas Tech (8–1–0)	Florida (7–4–0)	Virginia Tech (9–2–1)	Michigan (11–3–1)	Washington (9–3–2)	California (11–3–3)	Michigan (14–4–1)	Wisconsin (14–3–2)	20.
21.	Wisconsin	Georgetown (1–1–0)	Colorado (4–0–0)	Santa Clara (3–3–0)	Colorado (6–1–0)	Wisconsin (6–2–1)	Michigan (8–2–1)	Oklahoma State (9–1–3)	Rutgers (10–2–2)	Clemson (9–4–1)	Washington (10–4–2)	Xavier (14–3–2)	Brown (14–1–1)	21.
22.	Clemson	Washington State (1–0–0)	Wisconsin (3–1–0)	Boston College (6–0–0)	Boston College (7–0–1)	Kansas (8–2–0)	Vanderbilt (8–3–0)	Rutgers (9–2–1)	Washington (8–3–2)	South Florida (10–3–0)	Florida (10–6–1)	Duke (8–3–7)	Santa Clara (13–5–2)	22.
23.	Washington State	Colorado (2–0–0)	BYU (2–0–0)	Virginia Tech (6–0–0)	Penn State (4–3–1)	Memphis (8–1–0)	Virginia Tech (9–2–0)	Michigan (9–3–1)	Clemson (8–4–1)	Texas Tech (11–2–2)	Brown (12–1–1)	NC State (10–5–4)	Vanderbilt (14–5–1)	23.
24.	NC State	Wisconsin (1–1–0)	Florida (2–2–0)	Georgetown (3–2–1)	California (7–0–0)	Rutgers (7–1–1)	Washington State (8–1–0)	Washington State (9–2–0)	Santa Clara (8–5–1)	UCLA (9–4–1)	Vanderbilt (12–4–1)	Santa Clara (11–5–2)	Duke (8–3–7)	24.
25.	Colorado	BYU (2–0–0)	Denver (3–0–1)	Wisconsin (4–1–1)	Memphis (7–1–0)	Iowa (9–1–0)	Oklahoma State (7–1–3)	South Florida (8–3–0)	South Florida (8–3–0)	Texas A&M (10–3–3); Washington State (10–3–1)	Michigan (13–4–1)	USF (12–4–0)	Michigan (15–5–1)	25.
	Preseason Aug. 20	Week 1 Aug. 27	Week 2 Sep. 3	Week 3 Sep. 10	Week 4 Sep. 17	Week 5 Sep. 24	Week 6 Oct. 1	Week 7 Oct. 8	Week 8 Oct. 15	Week 9 Oct. 22	Week 10 Oct. 29	Week 11 Nov. 5	Final Nov. 12	
		Dropped: No. 15 South Florida; No. 20 Texas Tech	Dropped: No. 13 Santa Clara; No. 16 Texas	Dropped: No. 13 Baylor; No. 19 NC State; No. 24 Florida; No. 25 Denver	Dropped: No. 13 Wake Forest; No. 16 Washington State; No. 19 West Virginia; No. 21 Santa Clara; No. 25 Wisconsin	Dropped: No. 22 Boston College; No. 23 Penn State; No. 24 California	Dropped: No. 19 Tennessee; No. 22 Kansas; No. 24 Rutgers; No. 25 Iowa	Dropped: No. 8 California; No. 14 Colorado	Dropped: No. 20 Virginia Tech; No. 24 Washington State	Dropped: No. 24 Santa Clara	Dropped: No. 21 Clemson; No. 25 Washington State	Dropped: No. 19 Louisville; No. 21 Washington; No. 22 Florida	Dropped: No. 17 California; No. 23 NC State	

== Top Drawer Soccer ==
	Preseason Jul 15	Week 1 Aug 22	Week 2 Aug 26	Week 3 Sep 2	Week 4 Sep 9	Week 5 Sep 16	Week 6 Sep 23	Week 7 Sep 30	Week 8 Oct 7	Week 9 Oct 14	Week 10 Oct 21	Week 11 Oct 28	Week 12 Nov 4	Week 13 Nov 11	Week 14 Nov 18	Week 15 Nov 25	Week 16 Dec 2	Final Dec 9	
1.	Florida State	Florida State	Florida State (1–0–0)	UCLA (4–0–0)	North Carolina (6–0–0)	Virginia (8–0–0)	Virginia (8–0–1)	Virginia (9–0–2)	Virginia (10–0–2)	Virginia (11–0–3)	Virginia (12–0–3)	Virginia (14–0–3)	Virginia (15–0–3)	North Carolina (19–1–1)	North Carolina (20–1–1)	North Carolina (22–1–1)	North Carolina (23–1–1)	Stanford (23–1–1)	1.
2.	UCLA	UCLA	UCLA (2–0–0)	North Carolina (4–0–0)	Stanford (5–0–0)	USC (7–0–0)	USC (7–0–1)	North Carolina (10–1–0)	North Carolina (11–1–0)	North Carolina (12–1–1)	North Carolina (13–1–1)	North Carolina (15–1–1)	North Carolina (17–1–1)	Stanford (18–1–0)	Stanford (19–1–0)	Stanford (21–1–0)	Stanford (22–1–0)	North Carolina (24–1–2)	2.
3.	North Carolina	North Carolina	North Carolina (2–0–0)	Stanford (4–0–0)	Virginia (6–0–0)	UCLA (5–1–0)	North Carolina (8–1–0)	Stanford (8–1–0)	Stanford (10–1–0)	Stanford (12–1–0)	Stanford (13–1–0)	Stanford (15–1–0)	Stanford (17–1–0)	Virginia (16–1–3)	Virginia (17–1–3)	BYU (21–0–1)	UCLA (18–4–1)	UCLA (18–5–1)	3.
4.	Stanford	Stanford	Stanford (2–0–0)	Virginia (4–0–0)	USC (6–0–0)	North Carolina (7–1–0)	Stanford (7–1–0)	Florida State (9–2–0)	Florida State (10–2–0)	USC (11–1–1)	BYU (13–0–1)	BYU (15–0–1)	BYU (16–0–1)	BYU (18–0–1)	BYU (19–0–1)	Florida State (18–5–0)	Washington State (16–6–1)	Washington State (16–7–1)	4.
5.	Virginia	Virginia	Virginia (2–0–0)	Penn State (3–1–0)	UCLA (4–1–0)	Stanford (6–1–0)	UCLA (6–1–1)	BYU (10–0–0)	USC (9–1–1)	BYU (12–0–1)	Florida State (12–3–0)	Arkansas (13–2–2)	Arkansas (14–2–2)	Florida State (15–5–0)	Florida State (16–5–0)	South Carolina (19–1–3)	Florida State (18–6–0)	Florida State (18–6–0)	5.
6.	Penn State	Penn State	Penn State (1–1–0)	USC (4–0–0)	Penn State (4–1–1)	Florida State (6–2–0)	Florida State (7–2–0)	USC (7–1–1)	South Carolina (10–1–0)	Florida State (11–3–0)	Arkansas (12–2–1)	Florida State (13–4–0)	Florida State (15–4–0)	South Carolina (16–1–3)	South Carolina (17–1–3)	UCLA (17–4–1)	USC (17–5–1)	USC (17–5–1)	6.
7.	USC	USC	USC (2–0–0)	Florida State (2–2–0)	Florida State (4–2–0)	BYU (5–0–0)	BYU (8–0–0)	Washington State (8–1–0)	BYU (10–0–1)	South Carolina (11–1–1)	USC (11–2–1)	South Carolina (12–1–3)	South Carolina (13–1–3)	Arkansas (16–3–2)	UCLA (15–4–1)	USC (17–4–1)	BYU (21–1–1)	BYU (21–1–1)	7.
8.	Georgetown	Georgetown	Vanderbilt (2–0–0)	Vanderbilt (4–0–0)	Vanderbilt (6–0–0)	Rutgers (6–0–1)	Vanderbilt (8–1–0)	South Carolina (9–1–0)	Memphis (12–1–0)	Louisville (11–1–1)	South Carolina (11–1–2)	Memphis (15–1–1)	Memphis (16–1–1)	USC (14–4–1)	Arkansas (17–3–2)	Washington State (15–6–1)	South Carolina (19–2–3)	South Carolina (19–2–3)	8.
9.	Santa Clara	Santa Clara	Texas A&M (1–0–1)	Texas A&M (3–0–1)	Texas A&M (4–0–2)	Vanderbilt (7–1–0)	Washington State (7–1–0)	Texas A&M (9–1–2)	Georgetown (9–2–1)	Memphis (13–1–1)	Louisville (11–1–2)	Brown (12–1–1)	Brown (13–1–1)	UCLA (14–4–1)	USC (15–4–1)	Virginia (17–2–3)	Virginia (17–2–3)	Virginia (17–2–3)	9.
10.	Vanderbilt	Vanderbilt	Tennessee (2–0–0)	Washington State (3–0–0)	Washington State (4–0–0)	South Florida (5–1–0)	South Carolina (7–1–0)	UCLA (6–2–1)	Louisville (10–1–0)	Duke (7–1–5)	Memphis (13–1–1)	Wisconsin (13–2–2)	USC (14–3–1)	Brown (14–1–2)	Brown (14–1–3)	Arkansas (17–4–2)	Arkansas (17–4–2)	Arkansas (17–4–2)	10.
11.	Texas A&M	Texas A&M	Texas (1–0–0)	South Carolina (3–0–0)	South Carolina (5–0–0)	Washington State (5–1–0)	Texas A&M (7–1–2)	Duke (6–1–3)	Washington State (9–2–0)	Georgetown (10–2–2)	Duke (7–1–6)	Duke (8–1–7)	UCLA (13–4–1)	South Florida (14–4–0)	South Florida (15–4–0)	Brown (14–2–3)	Brown (14–2–3)	Brown (14–2–3)	11.
12.	Tennessee	Tennessee	Washington State (1–0–0)	BYU (3–0–0)	BYU (4–0–0)	South Carolina (6–1–0)	Duke (5–1–2)	Georgetown (7–2–1)	Duke (6–1–4)	Washington State (9–3–1)	Georgetown (10–2–3)	USC (12–3–1)	Rutgers (15–2–2)	Memphis (17–2–1)	Oklahoma State (16–2–3)	South Florida (16–5–0)	South Florida (16–5–0)	South Florida (16–5–0)	12.
13.	Texas	Texas	South Carolina (2–0–0)	Rutgers (4–0–0)	Rutgers (5–0–1)	Texas A&M (5–1–2)	Virginia Tech (9–0–0)	Colorado (9–1–0)	Texas A&M (9–2–2)	Brown (9–1–1)	Washington State (10–3–1)	UCLA (11–4–1)	Georgetown (12–3–3)	Rutgers (15–3–2)	Texas A&M (14–4–3)	Oklahoma State (16–3–3)	Oklahoma State (16–3–3)	Oklahoma State (16–3–3)	13.
14.	South Florida	South Florida	BYU (2–0–0)	Tennessee (3–1–0)	Tennessee (5–1–0)	Tennessee (5–1–1)	Rutgers (7–1–1)	Memphis (10–1–0)	Brown (8–1–1)	Wisconsin (10–2–1)	Brown (10–1–1)	Rutgers (14–2–2)	Oklahoma State (15–1–3)	Oklahoma State (15–2–3)	Kansas (16–4–3)	Texas A&M (14–5–3)	Texas A&M (14–5–3)	Texas A&M (14–5–3)	14.
15.	Washington State	Washington State	Georgetown (1–1–0)	Georgetown (2–1–1)	South Florida (4–1–0)	Duke (5–1–1)	Georgetown (6–2–1)	California (9–1–0)	Wisconsin (9–2–1)	UCLA (9–3–1)	Wisconsin (11–2–2)	Louisville (12–2–2)	Texas A&M (13–3–3)	Texas A&M (13–4–3)	Wisconsin (15–3–2)	Kansas (17–5–3)	Kansas (17–5–3)	Kansas (17–5–3)	15.
16.	South Carolina	South Carolina	Santa Clara (1–1–0)	NC State (2–1–0)	Duke (4–1–1)	Virginia Tech (8–0–0)	South Florida (5–2–0)	Louisville (9–1–0)	UCLA (7–3–1)	Texas A&M (10–2–3)	Clemson (9–4–1)	Georgetown (11–3–3)	California (13–3–3)	Kansas (15–4–3)	Duke (9–3–7)	Wisconsin (16–4–2)	Wisconsin (16–4–2)	Wisconsin (16–4–2)	16.
17.	Duke	Duke	Rutgers (1–0–0)	South Florida (1–1–0)	Colorado (6–0–0)	Penn State (4–3–1)	Colorado (8–1–0)	Brown (7–1–1)	Clemson (8–2–1)	Arkansas (11–2–1)	Virginia Tech (10–3–2)	Oklahoma State (13–1–3)	Wisconsin (14–3–2)	Georgetown (13–4–3)	Clemson (11–6–2)	Duke (9–4–7)	Duke (9–4–7)	Duke (9–4–7)	17.
18.	West Virginia	West Virginia	Memphis (2–0–0)	Duke (2–1–1)	Boston College (6–0–0)	Georgetown (5–2–1)	Tennessee (6–2–1)	Wisconsin (7–2–1)	Virginia Tech (9–2–1)	Clemson (8–4–1)	UCLA (9–4–1)	Texas A&M (12–3–3)	Duke (8–3–7)	California (13–4–3)	Xavier (17–3–2)	Clemson (11–7–2)	Clemson (11–7–2)	Clemson (11–7–2)	18.
19.	Rutgers	Rutgers	West Virginia (1–1–0)	Baylor (2–0–1)	Georgetown (3–2–1)	Boston College (7–0–1)	Arkansas (7–1–1)	Virginia Tech (9–2–0)	Rutgers (9–2–1)	Virginia Tech (9–3–2)	Rutgers (12–2–2)	South Florida (12–3–0)	Clemson (11–6–1)	Wisconsin (14–3–2)	Washington (12–6–2)	Xavier (17–4–2)	Xavier (17–4–2)	Xavier (17–4–2)	19.
20.	Saint Louis	Saint Louis	NC State (1–1–0)	Wake Forest (4–0–0)	Virginia Tech (6–0–0)	Colorado (6–1–0)	Clemson (7–0–1)	Clemson (8–1–1)	Colorado (9–2–1)	Rutgers (10–2–2)	Texas A&M (10–3–3)	Clemson (10–5–1)	Virginia Tech (12–4–2)	Duke (8–3–7)	Texas Tech (15–3–3)	Washington (12–7–2)	Washington (12–7–2)	Washington (12–7–2)	20.
21.	NC State	NC State	South Florida (1–1–0)	Boston College (4–0–0)	Wake Forest (5–0–1)	Iowa (8–0–0)	Memphis (8–1–0)	Rutgers (7–2–1)	South Florida (8–3–0)	South Florida (8–3–0)	South Florida (10–3–0)	Virginia Tech (11–4–2)	Washington State (12–5–1)	Clemson (11–6–1)	Washington State (13–6–1)	Texas Tech (15–4–3)	Texas Tech (15–4–3)	Texas Tech (15–4–3)	21.
22.	BYU	BYU	Duke (1–1–0)	Clemson (4–0–0)	Baylor (3–1–1)	Arkansas (6–1–1)	Michigan (7–2–0)	South Florida (6–3–0)	Vanderbilt (9–3–0)	Oklahoma State (10–1–3)	Oklahoma State (12–1–3)	California (11–3–3)	Washington (10–6–2)	Virginia Tech (12–4–2)	Santa Clara (14–5–2)	Santa Clara (15–6–2)	Santa Clara (15–6–2)	Santa Clara (15–6–2)	22.
23.	Princeton	Princeton	Princeton (0–0–0)	Colorado (4–0–0)	NC State (3–2–0)	Clemson (6–0–1)	Boston College (7–1–1)	Vanderbilt (8–3–0)	Arkansas (9–2–1)	Vanderbilt (10–3–1)	Vanderbilt (11–3–1)	Washington State (10–5–1)	South Florida (12–4–0)	Washington (11–6–2)	Arizona (12–6–1)	Arizona (12–7–1)	Arizona (12–7–1)	Arizona (12–7–1)	23.
24.	Memphis	Memphis	Baylor (1–0–0)	Texas (1–2–0)	Princeton (2–1–1)	Memphis (7–1–0)	Texas Tech (8–1–0)	Arkansas (8–2–1)	Florida (8–4–0)	Texas Tech (11–1–2)	California (10–3–2)	Washington (10–4–2)	Texas Tech (15–2–2)	Texas Tech (15–3–2)	Memphis (17–3–1)	NC State (12–7–4)	NC State (12–7–4)	NC State (12–7–4)	24.
25.	Baylor	Baylor	Wake Forest (2–0–0)	Princeton (1–1–0)	Texas (3–2–0)	Louisville (7–0–0)	Iowa (9–1–0)	Michigan (8–2–1)	Texas Tech (10–1–1)	California (9–3–2)	Washington (9–3–2)	Texas Tech (13–2–2)	Vanderbilt (13–4–1)	Vanderbilt (14–5–1)	California (13–5–3)	Memphis (17–3–1)	Memphis (17–3–1)	Memphis (17–3–1)	25.
	Preseason Jul 15	Week 1 Aug 22	Week 2 Aug 26	Week 3 Sep 2	Week 4 Sep 9	Week 5 Sep 16	Week 6 Sep 23	Week 7 Sep 30	Week 8 Oct 7	Week 9 Oct 14	Week 10 Oct 21	Week 11 Oct 28	Week 12 Nov 4	Week 13 Nov 11	Week 14 Nov 18	Week 15 Nov 25	Week 16 Dec 2	Final Dec 9	
		None	Dropped: No. 20 Saint Louis	Dropped: No. 16 Santa Clara; No. 18 Memphis; No. 19 West Virginia	Dropped: No. 22 Clemson	Dropped: No. 21 Wake Forest; No. 22 Baylor; No. 23 NC State; No. 24 Princeton; No. 25 Texas	Dropped: No. 17 Penn State; No. 25 Louisville	Dropped: No. 18 Tennessee; No. 23 Boston College; No. 24 Texas Tech; No. 25 Iowa	Dropped: No. 15 California; No. 25 Michigan	Dropped: No. 20 Colorado; No. 24 Florida	Dropped: No. 24 Texas Tech	Dropped: No. 23 Vanderbilt	Dropped: No. 15 Louisville	Dropped: No. 21 Washington State	Dropped: No. 17 Georgetown; No. 22 Virginia Tech; No. 24 Texas Tech; No. 25 Vanderbilt	Dropped: No. 25 California	None	None	
