= CAF Women's Champions League UNAF Qualifiers =

North African football/soccer tournament

- Organiser(s): UNAF
- Founded: 2021; 5 years ago
- Region: Northern Africa
- Teams: 5
- Current champions: (Morocco) FUS Rabat (1st title)
- Most championships: (Morocco) AS FAR (3 titles)
- Broadcaster: UNAF Youtube Ch.
- Website: Official website
- 2026 CAF W-CL UNAF Q.

The CAF Women's Champions League UNAF Qualifiers (Arabic: تصفيات إتحاد شمال إفريقيا المؤهلة لدوري أبطال إفريقيا للسيدات) is the brand name for an annual international women's association football club competition organized by the UNAF (Union of North African Football), serving as the Northern African qualification tournament for the CAF Women's Champions League.

== History ==
In 2020, CAF announced the launch of the CAF Women's Champions League with each of the six sub confederations to hold qualifiers with the winners to represent them at the main tournament.

== Results ==
CAF Women's Champions League UNAF Qualifiers finals
Season	Winners	Score	Runners-up	Venue	Attendance
2021	(Morocco) AS FAR	^{n/a}	(Algeria) Afak Relizane	Stade Municipal de Berkane, Berkane	0 (Note: The final was played behind closed doors due to the COVID-19 pandemic in Africa.)
2022	(Egypt) Wadi Degla	^{n/a}	(Tunisia) AS Banque de l'Habitat	Stade Adrar, Agadir	0
2023	(Morocco) SC Casablanca	^{n/a}	(Algeria) Afak Relizane	Alexandria Stadium, Alexandria	300
2024	(Morocco) AS FAR	^{n/a}	(Egypt) FC Masar	Salem Mabrouki Stadium, Rouïba	150
2025	(Morocco) AS FAR	^{n/a}	(Egypt) FC Masar	Sousse Olympic Stadium, Sousse; Mustapha Ben Jannet Stadium, Monastir	
2026	(Morocco) FUS Rabat	^{n/a}	(Egypt) FC Masar	Chedly Zouiten Stadium, Tunis; Hédi Enneifer Stadium, Le Bardo (Tunis)	

^n/a A round-robin tournament determined the final standings.
FC Masar (ex. Tutankhamun FC).

== Records and statistics ==
=== Winners by club ===
Club	Winners	Runners-up	Years won	Years runners-up
(Morocco) AS FAR	3	0	2021, 2024, 2025	
(Egypt) Wadi Degla	1	0	2022	
(Morocco) SC Casablanca	1	0	2023	
(Morocco) FUS Rabat	1	0	2026	
(Egypt) FC Masar	0	3		2024, 2025, 2026
(Algeria) Afak Relizane	0	2		2021, 2023
(Tunisia) AS Banque de l'Habitat	0	1		2022

=== Performance by nation ===
Nation	Winners	Runners-up
Morocco	5	0
Egypt	1	3
Algeria	0	2
Tunisia	0	1

=== Top goalscorers ===
Season	Player	Club	Goals	Ref.
2021	(Morocco) Ibtissam Jraidi	(Morocco) AS FAR	6	
2022	(Egypt) Nouha Saleh	(Egypt) Wadi Degla	4	
2023	(Algeria) Naïma Bouhani	(Algeria) Afak Relizane	7	
2024	(Burundi) Sandrine Niyonkuru	(Egypt) Tutankhamun	5	
2025	(Egypt) Yasmin Mohamed	(Egypt) FC Masar	4	
2026	(Kenya) Jentrix Shikangwa	(Egypt) FC Masar	4	

== See also ==
- UNAF Women's Club Tournament
