= 2019 NCAA Division I women's soccer tournament =

2019 NCAA women's soccer tournament
Women's College Cup (Semifinals & Final)

Tournament details
- Country: United States
- Dates: November 15 – December 8, 2019
- Teams: 64

Final positions
- Champions: Stanford (3rd title)
- Runners-up: North Carolina
- Semifinalists: UCLA; Washington State

Tournament statistics
- Matches played: 63
- Goals scored: 192 (3.05 per match)
- Top goal scorer: Catarina Macario – Stanford (9 goals)

The 2019 NCAA Division I women's soccer tournament (also known as the 2019 Women's College Cup) was the 38th annual single-elimination tournament to determine the national champion of NCAA Division I women's collegiate soccer. The semifinals and championship game were played at Avaya Stadium in San Jose, California from December 6–8, 2019 while the preceding rounds were played at various sites across the country during November 2019.

== Qualification ==
All Division I women's soccer programs are eligible to qualify for the tournament. 28 teams received automatic bids by winning their conference tournaments, 3 teams received automatic bids by claiming the conference regular season crown (Ivy League, Pac-12 Conference, and West Coast Conference don't hold conference tournaments), and an additional 33 teams earned at-large bids based on their regular season records. The bracket was released on November 11, 2019

=== Stanford Section ===
Seed	School	Conference	Berth Type	Record	RPI	Appearance	Last bid
1	Stanford	Pac-12	Automatic	18–1–0	1	29th	2018
2	BYU	West Coast	Automatic	18–0–1	12	20th	2018
3	Arkansas	SEC	At-Large	16–3–2	6	6th	2018
4	Penn State	Big Ten	Automatic	15–6–1	22	25th	2018
	Arizona	Pac-12	At-Large	11–6–1	40	7th	2018
	Boise State	Mountain West	Automatic	18–4–0	76	2nd	2009
	Hofstra	CAA	Automatic	15–3–2	16	8th	2018
	Lipscomb	ASUN	Automatic	13–5–2	112	2nd	2018
	Louisville	ACC	At-Large	12–4–2	28	6th	2018
	Loyola–Chicago	Missouri Valley	Automatic	14–4–1	56	5th	2018
	Navy	Patriot	Automatic	16–2–3	90	4th	2007
	NC State	ACC	At-Large	10–6–4	19	15th	2018
	North Texas	C-USA	Automatic	15–5–1	47	7th	2018
	Prairie View A&M*	SWAC	Automatic	13–7–0	246	2nd	2014
	Stony Brook	America East	Automatic	14–5–1	110	3rd	2017
	TCU	Big 12	At-Large	11–7–3	55	4th	2018

- Prairie View won its first-ever conference title this year, but this is their second time to earn a berth in the tournament. In 2014, they were the SWAC tournament runner-up but earn the conference's berth to the NCAA tournament since the winner (Howard) was ineligible that year.

=== Florida State Section ===
Seed	School	Conference	Berth Type	Record	RPI	Appearance	Last bid
1	Florida State	ACC	At-Large	15–5–0	4	20th	2018
2	UCLA	Pac-12	At-Large	14–4–1	7	23rd	2018
3	Wisconsin	Big Ten	At-Large	14–3–2	17	21st	2018
4	Washington	Pac-12	At-Large	11–6–2	18	14th	2014
	Brown	Ivy	Automatic	14–1–2	10	7th	1994
	Clemson	ACC	At-Large	11–6–1	36	20th	2018
	Duke	ACC	At-Large	8–3–7	14	25th	2018
	Florida	SEC	At-Large	11–8–1	23	22nd	2017
	Lamar	Southland	Automatic	16–6–0	87	2nd	2017
	Milwaukee	Horizon	Automatic	17–1–1	50	13th	2018
	Monmouth	MAAC	Automatic	14–2–2	44	7th	2018
	Seattle	WAC	Automatic	12–7–2	119	5th	2018
	South Alabama	Sun Belt	Automatic	16–3–2	63	6th	2017
	South Florida	American	Automatic	14–4–0	24	6th	2018
	Utah	Pac-12	At-Large	8–8–4	51	8th	2016
	Vanderbilt	SEC	At-Large	14–5–1	33	10th	2018

=== Virginia Section ===
Seed	School	Conference	Berth Type	Record	RPI	Appearance	Last bid
1	Virginia	ACC	At-Large	16–1–2	3	32nd	2018
2	South Carolina	SEC	Automatic	16–1–3	5	13th	2018
3	Kansas	Big 12	Automatic	15–4–3	9	9th	2018
4	Rutgers	Big Ten	At-Large	15–3–2	13	14th	2018
	Central Connecticut	Northeast	Automatic	12–4–4	149	9th	2018
	Georgetown	Big East	At-Large	13–4–3	35	10th	2018
	Iowa	Big Ten	At-Large	15–4–1	45	2nd	2013
	Memphis	American	At-Large	17–2–1	26	8th	2018
	Notre Dame	ACC	At-Large	10–7–2	34	26th	2017
	Radford	Big South	Automatic	16–5–0	139	8th	2018
	Saint Louis	Atlantic 10	Automatic	17–3–2	38	4th	2018
	Samford	SoCon	Automatic	13–3–5	58	5th	2012
	Virginia Tech	ACC	At-Large	12–4–2	15	10th	2018
	Washington State	Pac-12	At-Large	12–6–1	27	13th	2018
	West Virginia	Big 12	At-Large	10–7–2	31	20th	2018
	Xavier	Big East	Automatic	16–3–2	42	3rd	2000

=== North Carolina Section ===
Seed	School	Conference	Berth Type	Record	RPI	Appearance	Last bid
1	North Carolina	ACC	Automatic	19–1–1	2	38th	2018
2	USC	Pac-12	At-Large	14–4–1	8	18th	2018
3	Oklahoma State	Big 12	At-Large	15–2–3	11	12th	2017
4	Texas Tech	Big 12	At-Large	15–3–2	20	7th	2018
	Belmont	Ohio Valley	Automatic	8–8–5	217	2nd	2008
	Bowling Green	MAC	Automatic	14–5–3	84	4th	2018
	California	Pac-12	At-Large	13–4–3	30	26th	2017
	Cal State Fullerton	Big West	Automatic	14–2–4	102	8th	2017
	Colorado	Pac-12	At-Large	11–7–2	43	11th	2017
	Michigan	Big Ten	At-Large	15–5–1	25	14th	2016
	Northern Colorado	Big Sky	Automatic	9–10–4	224	2nd	2015
	Pepperdine	West Coast	At-Large	11–6–2	46	11th	2017
	Santa Clara	West Coast	At-Large	13–5–2	29	29th	2018
	South Dakota State	Summit	Automatic	15–4–3	118	5th	2016
	Texas	Big 12	At-Large	11–7–1	48	14th	2018
	Texas A&M	SEC	At-Large	13–4–3	21	25th	2018

== Bracket ==
The bracket was announced on Monday, November 11, 2019.

=== Stanford Bracket ===
First round Campus Sites
1	Stanford*	15
Prairie View A&M	0
Hofstra* (a.e.t.)	1
Loyola–Chicago	0
Arizona*	1
TCU	0
4	Penn State*	3
Stony Brook	1
3	Arkansas*	3
North Texas	0
NC State*	3
Navy	0
Louisville*	1
Lipscomb	0
2	BYU*	5
Boise State	1

Second round Regional Campus Sites
1	Stanford	4
Hofstra	0
Arizona	3
4	Penn State (a.e.t.)	4
3	Arkansas	1
NC State	2
Louisville	0
2	BYU	4

Round of 16; Regional Campus Sites
1	Stanford	2
4	Penn State	0
NC State	0
2	BYU	3

Quarterfinal; Campus Sites
1	Stanford	5
2	BYU	1

* Host institution

==== Schedule ====
===== First round =====
November 15, 2019	#18 Penn State	3–1	Stony Brook	University Park, Pennsylvania
6:00 pm EST	Frankie Tagliaferri 49'; Sam Coffey 49'; Kerry Abello 62'	Report	17' Fanny Gotesson	Stadium: Jeffrey Field; Attendance: 689; Referee: Robert Sheker; Assistant referees: Dustin Killick; Justin Hess; Fourth official: Max Campbell

November 15, 2019	#23 Louisville	1–0	Lipscomb	Louisville, Kentucky
6:00 pm EST	Sarah Hernandez 44'	Report		Stadium: Lynn Stadium; Attendance: 508; Referee: Aaron Hernandez; Assistant referees: Sara Renyer; Skyye Medley; Fourth official: Dennis Beard

November 15, 2019	NC State	3–0	Navy	Raleigh, North Carolina
7:00 pm EST	Lulu Guttenberger 54'; Leyah Hall-Robinson 74'; Anna Toohey 74'	Report	(yellow card) 23' Kaitlynn Johns	Stadium: Dail Soccer Field/Track Complex; Attendance: 342; Referee: Mark Kadlecik; Assistant referees: Jude Carr; Brian Odenwald; Fourth official: Carmen Serbio

November 15, 2019	#8 Arkansas	3–0	North Texas	Fayetteville, Arkansas
7:30 pm EST	Tori Cannata 54'; Parker Goins 81'; Kaelee Van Gundy 83'	Report		Stadium: Razorback Field; Attendance: 1,331; Referee: Jose Lara-Mancia; Assistant referees: Matt Trotter; DeShun Beard; Fourth official: Daniel Ortega

November 15, 2019	#4 BYU	5–1	Boise State	Provo, Utah
8:00 pm EST	Cameron Tucker 18', 19'; Jamie Shepherd 53'; SaraJayne Affleck 63'; Elise Flake 66'; Laveni Vaka (yellow card) 71'	Report	21' Emily Curry; (yellow card) 58' Kristina Serres	Stadium: South Field; Attendance: 3,682; Referee: Younes Marrakchi; Assistant referees: Karsten Gillwald; Adam Mueller; Fourth official: Scott Conner

November 15, 2019	#1 Stanford	15–0	Prairie View A&M	Stanford, California
10:00 pm EST	Catarina Macario 4', 31', 69', 77'; Sophia Smith 8', 15', 58'; Abby Greubel 23'; Sam Tran 28', 74'; Kiki Pickett 28'; Jojo Harber 38'; Bianca Caetano-Ferrara 65', 71', 82'	Report		Stadium: Laird Q. Cagan Stadium; Attendance: 1,371; Referee: Christopher Spivey; Assistant referees: Vince Apple-Chiarella; Isai Baltezar; Fourth official: Jamie Padilla

November 16, 2019	Hofstra	1–0 (a.e.t.)	Loyola–Chicago	Hempstead, New York
1:00 pm EST	Sabrina Bryan 93'	Report	(yellow card) 76' Simone Wark	Stadium: Hofstra University Soccer Stadium; Attendance: 603; Referee: Jeremy Scheer; Assistant referees: Katarzyna Wasiak; Thomas Felice; Fourth official: Koko Veltchev

November 16, 2019	Arizona	1–0	TCU	Tucson, Arizona
8:00 pm EST	Brynn Moga 62'; Sabrina Enciso (yellow card) 81'	Report	(red card) 71' Messiah Bright; (yellow card) 84' Yazmeen Ryan	Stadium: Mulcahy Soccer Stadium; Attendance: 1,178; Referee: Arnold Baldeaux; Assistant referees: Corey Rockwell; Robi Hullner; Fourth official: Charles Farr

===== Second round =====
November 21, 2019	#8 Arkansas	1–2	NC State	Provo, Utah
5:00 p.m. EST	Tori Cannata 87'	Report	17' Kia Rankin; 47' Lulu Guttenberger	Stadium: South Field; Referee: Joe Pickens; Assistant referees: Thomas Habtemicael; Scott Conner; Fourth official: Karsten Gillwald

November 21, 2019	#4 BYU	4–0	#23 Louisville	Provo, Utah
8:00 p.m. EST	Elise Flake 61'; Mikayla Colohan 62', 81', (yellow card) 64'; Cameron Tucker 67'	Report	(yellow card) 85' Jessica De Filippo	Stadium: South Field; Attendance: 2,476; Referee: Adam Zarrin; Assistant referees: Karsten Gillwald; Lauren Parliment; Fourth official: Thomas Habtemicael

November 22, 2019	#18 Penn State	4–3 (a.e.t.)	Arizona	Stanford, California
7:00 p.m. EST	Ally Schlegel 57'; Sam Coffey 61', 87'; Frankie Tagliaferri 97'	Report	38' Grace Santos; 49' Iyana Zimmerman; 68' Jill Aguilera	Stadium: Laird Q. Cagan Stadium; Attendance: 446; Referee: Christopher Spivey; Assistant referees: Troy Thiele; Jamie Padilla; Fourth official: Brandom Chapman

November 22, 2019	#1 Stanford	4–0	Hofstra	Stanford, California
12:00 a.m. EST	Madison Haley 2', (yellow card) 51'; Catarina Macario 54', 57'; Sophia Smith 57'; Sam Tran (yellow card) 76'	Report	(yellow card) 54' Anja Suttner	Stadium: Laird Q. Cagan Stadium; Attendance: 1,800; Referee: Matthew Buckman; Assistant referees: Deleana Quan; Brandom Chapman; Fourth official: Troy Thiele

===== Round of 16 =====
November 23, 2019	#4 BYU	3–0	NC State	Provo, Utah
8:00 p.m. EST	Cameron Tucker 11', 48'; Josie Guinn 33'	Report		Stadium: South Field; Attendance: 3,629; Referee: Brad Jensen; Assistant referees: Joe Pickens; Kastriot Baruni; Fourth official: Hamed Sadeghi

November 24, 2019	#1 Stanford	2–0	#18 Penn State	Stanford, California
4:00 p.m. EST	Catarina Macario 29'; Maya Doms 64'	Report		Stadium: Laird Q. Cagan Stadium; Attendance: 1,847; Referee: Frank Anderson; Assistant referees: Deleana Quan; Luis Gutierrez; Fourth official: Matthew Buckman

===== Quarterfinals =====
November 29, 2019	#1 Stanford	5–1	#4 BYU	Stanford, California
6:00 p.m. EST	Catarina Macario 16', 29'; Kiki Pickett 40'; Sam Tran 42'; BYU Own Goal 53' (o.g.)	Report	(yellow card) 41' Rachel Lyman; 63' Danika Serassio; (yellow card) 75' Natalie Clark	Stadium: Laird Q. Cagan Stadium; Attendance: 2,041; Referee: Adrian Gonzalez; Assistant referees: Isai Baltezar; Christoper Elliott; Fourth official: Jamie Padilla

Rankings from United Soccer Coaches Final Regular Season Rankings

=== Florida State Bracket ===
First round Campus Sites
2	UCLA*	4
Lamar	1
Clemson* (p)	0 (5)
Vanderbilt	0 (4)
Duke*	4
Utah	0
Milwaukee	0
3	Wisconsin*	1
4	Washington*	1
Seattle	0
Florida*	2
South Florida	4
Brown* (p)	0 (4)
Monmouth	0 (1)
South Alabama	0
1	Florida State*	2

Second round Regional Campus Sites
2	UCLA	5
Clemson	0
Duke	0
3	Wisconsin	1
4	Washington	0
South Florida	2
Brown	0
1	Florida State	2

Round of 16; Regional Campus Sites
2	UCLA	2
3	Wisconsin	0
South Florida	1
1	Florida State	2

Quarterfinal; Campus Sites
2	UCLA	4
1	Florida State	0

* Host institution

==== Schedule ====
===== First round =====
November 15, 2019	Clemson	0–0 (a.e.t.) (5–4 p)	Vanderbilt	Clemson, South Carolina
5:00 pm EST	Sydney Dawson (yellow card) 87'	Report	(yellow card) 77' Grace Jackson; (yellow card) 87' Madison Elwell	Stadium: Riggs Field; Attendance: 327; Referee: Mark Buda; Assistant referees: Zachary McWhorter; Rick Rogers; Fourth official: Khadime Sabara
	Penalties
	Renée Guion (penalty scored); Dani Antieau (penalty scored); Julie Mackin (penalty scored); Speckmaier (penalty missed); Mackenzie Smith (penalty scored); Patrice DiPasquale (penalty scored)		Ella Shamburger (penalty scored); Grace Jackson (penalty scored); Kaylann Boyd (penalty scored); Hannon Eberts (penalty scored); Paola Ellis (penalty missed); Leila Azari (penalty missed)

November 15, 2019	#12 Duke	4–0	Utah	Durham, North Carolina
6:00 pm EST	Emmy Duerr 31', 50'; Tess Boade 65'; Mackenzie Pluck 87'	Report		Stadium: Koskinen Stadium; Attendance: 190; Referee: Patrick Schmidt; Assistant referees: Eric Usher; Hudson Owens; Fourth official: John Matto

November 15, 2019	#10 Wisconsin	1–0	Milwaukee	Madison, Wisconsin
6:00 pm EST	Dani Rhodes 23'	Report		Stadium: McClimon Soccer Field; Attendance: 829; Referee: Kyle Trimble; Assistant referees: James Walter; Zachary Gaidar; Fourth official: Trevor Fulk

November 15, 2019	Florida	2–4	#17 South Florida	Gainesville, Florida
7:00 pm EST	Deanne Rose 61'; Georgia Eaton-Collins 84'	Report	(yellow card) 28', (goal) 83' Fanny Pelletier-Laroche; 42', 51', 54' Evelyne Viens; (yellow card) 75' Kouri Peace	Stadium: Donald R. Dizney Stadium; Attendance: 320; Referee: Mary Penso; Assistant referees: Natalie Simon; Hassan Belmnahia; Fourth official: Albert Escovar

November 15, 2019	#7 UCLA	4–1	Lamar	Los Angeles, California
9:00 pm EST	Jessie Fleming 9'; Delanie Sheehan 31'; Maricarmen Reyes 36'; Kali Trevithick 74'	Report	89' Lucy Ashworth	Stadium: Wallis Annenberg Stadium; Attendance: 755; Referee: Andrea Reyes; Assistant referees: Amir Torkamani; Jaclyn Reilman; Fourth official: Brandon Stevis

November 16, 2019	#16 Brown	0–0 (a.e.t.) (4–1 p)	Monmouth	Providence, Rhode Island
12:30 pm EST	Sydney Cummings (yellow card) 32'	Report		Stadium: Stevenson Field; Attendance: 950; Referee: Jan Halaska; Assistant referees: Katherine McCormick; Joseph Poremba; Fourth official: Syrus Ataii
	Penalties
	Abby Carchio (penalty scored); Celia Story (penalty scored); Ava Seelenfreund (penalty scored); Brittany Raphino (penalty scored)		(penalty scored) Jess Johnson; (penalty missed) Lauren Karabin; (penalty missed) Sarina Jones

November 16, 2019	#6 Florida State	2–0	South Alabama	Tallahassee, Florida
6:00 pm EST	Kristen McFarland 4', 58'	Report		Stadium: Seminole Soccer Complex; Attendance: 1,135; Referee: Alex DeRostaining; Assistant referees: Arnel Selman; Abdel Kuttaineh; Fourth official: Kevin Flynn

November 16, 2019	Washington	1–0	Seattle	Seattle, Washington
9:00 pm EST	Shae Holmes 55'; Summer Yates (yellow card) 83'	Report	(yellow card) 54' Kelsey Crosby; (yellow card) 78' Olivia Ovenell	Stadium: Husky Soccer Stadium; Attendance: 1,922; Assistant referees: Arnel Selman; Abdel Kuttaineh; Fourth official: Kevin Flynn

===== Second round =====
November 22, 2019	Washington	0–2	#17 South Florida	Tallahassee, Florida
3:00 p.m. EST		Report	24', 50' Evelyne Viens; (yellow card) 55' Chyanne Dennis; (yellow card) 75' Rebekah Anderson; (yellow card) 82' Brianna Blethen	Stadium: Seminole Soccer Complex; Attendance: 232; Referee: Sergil Demianchuk; Assistant referees: Aleksandar Zhelyazkov; Kyle Johnston; Fourth official: Khadime Sabara

November 22, 2019	#6 Florida State	2–0	#16 Brown	Tallahassee, Florida
5:00 p.m. EST	Kristen McFarland 28', 87'	Report		Stadium: Seminole Soccer Complex; Referee: Esteban Rosano; Assistant referees: Jon Skinner; Larry Pachon; Fourth official: Kyle Johnson

November 22, 2019	#12 Duke	0–1	#10 Wisconsin	Los Angeles, California
5:00 pm EST		Report	77' Dani Rhodes	Stadium: Wallis Annenberg Stadium; Referee: Daniel Radford; Assistant referees: Salma Perez; Amir Torkamani; Fourth official: Nathan Max

November 22, 2019	#7 UCLA	5–0	Clemson	Los Angeles, California
11:00 pm EST	Mia Fishel 4', 74'; Lucy Parker 30'; Ashley Sanchez 36'; Kali Trevithick 41'	Report	(yellow card) 30' Kimber Haley; (yellow card) 64' Dani Antieau	Stadium: Wallis Annenberg Stadium; Attendance: 1,332; Referee: Frank Anderson; Assistant referees: Loren Barnet; Nathan Max; Fourth official: Amir Torkamani

===== Round of 16 =====
November 24, 2019	#6 Florida State	2–1	#17 South Florida	Tallahassee, Florida
1:00 p.m. EST	Jaelin Howell 44'; Deyna Castellanos 52' (pen.); Kristen McFarland (yellow card) 59'	Report	4', (yellow card) 82' Aubrey Megrath; (yellow card) 17' Fanny Pelletier-Laroche; (yellow card) 53' Evelyne Viens; (yellow card) 66' Lucy Roberts; (yellow card) 72' Andrea Hauksdottir; (yellow card) 73' Team	Stadium: Seminole Soccer Complex; Attendance: 1,032; Referee: Albert Escovar; Assistant referees: Kayla Polonsky; Jamie Willis; Fourth official: Kevin Flynn

November 24, 2019	#7 UCLA	2–0	#10 Wisconsin	Los Angeles, California
7:00 p.m. EST	Mia Fishel 48'; Viviana Villacorta 52'	Report	(yellow card) 52' Camryn Biegalski	Stadium: Wallis Annenberg Stadium; Attendance: 1,187; Referee: Samantha Martinez; Assistant referees: Andrea Reyes; Kristin Patterson; Fourth official: Reyna Fonseca

===== Quarterfinals =====
November 29, 2019	#6 Florida State	0–4	#7 UCLA	Tallahassee, Florida
2:00 p.m. EST		Report	7', 17' Chloe Castaneda; 31', 53' Mia Fishel; (yellow card) 34' Lucy Parker	Stadium: Seminole Soccer Complex; Attendance: 2,079; Referee: Dimitar Chavdarov; Assistant referees: Alyssa Pennington; Amin Hadzic; Fourth official: Tarik Veledar

Rankings from United Soccer Coaches Final Regular Season Rankings

=== Virginia Bracket ===
First round Campus Sites
1	Virginia*	3
Radford	0
Washington State*	1
Memphis	0
Georgetown*	0
West Virginia	2
Central Connecticut	1
4	Rutgers*	0
3	Kansas*	1
Iowa	0
Virginia Tech*	0
Xavier	1
Notre Dame*	1
Saint Louis	0
Samford	0
2	South Carolina*	3

Second round Regional Campus Sites
1	Virginia	2
Washington State	3
West Virginia (a.e.t.)	1
Central Connecticut	0
3	Kansas	3
Xavier	0
Notre Dame	0
2	South Carolina	1

Round of 16; Regional Campus Sites
Washington State	3
West Virginia	0
3	Kansas	0
2	South Carolina	2

Quarterfinal; Campus Sites
Washington State (a.e.t.)	1
2	South Carolina	0

* Host institution

==== Schedule ====
===== First round =====
November 15, 2019	Virginia Tech	0–1	#24 Xavier	Blacksburg, Virginia
5:00 pm EST		Report	1' Molly McLaughlin; (yellow card) 88' Olivia Jenkins	Stadium: Thompson Field; Attendance: 633; Referee: Danielle Chesky; Assistant referees: Raymond Thomas; Ryan Williams; Fourth official: Joe Kirkpatrick

November 15, 2019	#21 Rutgers	0–1	Central Connecticut	Piscataway, New Jersey
7:00 pm EST		Report	(yellow card) 71' Shauny Altersio; (yellow card) 84' Allyson O'Rourke; 88' Erica Bardes	Stadium: Yurcak Field; Attendance: 609; Referee: Magda Zwierzchowski; Assistant referees: Teri Connor; Larry Urwiler; Fourth official: Nate Penn

November 15, 2019	Washington State	1–0	#14 Memphis	Pullman, Washington
8:00 pm EST	Makamae Gomera-Stevens 61'	Report	(yellow card) 39' Kimberley Smit	Stadium: Lower Soccer Field; Attendance: 1,100; Referee: Will Niccolls; Assistant referees: JJ Blodgett; Ryan Jung; Fourth official: Pawel Sojka

November 16, 2019	#25 Georgetown	0–2	West Virginia	Washington, D.C.
12:00 pm EST	Caitlin Moon (yellow card) 66'	Report	12', 39' Alina Stahl	Stadium: Shaw Field; Attendance: 951; Referee: Sergio Gonzalez; Assistant referees: Sharon Gingrich; Alla Stepanov; Fourth official: Joshua Metcalf

November 16, 2019	#5 South Carolina	3–0	Samford	Columbia, South Carolina
6:00 pm EST	Sarah Eskew (yellow card) 33'; Samantha Chang 40'; Luciana Zullo 54'; Riley Tanner 80'	Report		Stadium: Stone Stadium; Referee: Sergii Demianchuk; Assistant referees: Daniel Thornberry; Kyle Johnston; Fourth official: Skye Arthur-Banning

November 16, 2019	#11 Kansas	1–0	Iowa	Lawrence, Kansas
6:00 pm EST	Madison Meador (yellow card) 44'; Mandi Duggan (yellow card) 59'; Kailey Lane 69'; Sophie Maierhofer (yellow card) 86'	Report	(yellow card) 54' Devin Burns; (yellow card) 65' Sara Wheaton	Stadium: Rock Chalk Park; Attendance: 1,547; Referee: Luis Tribaldo; Assistant referees: Ryan Cook; Emily Brownback; Fourth official: Phillip Gomez

November 16, 2019	#3 Virginia	3–0	Radford	Charlottesville, Virginia
7:00 pm EST	Sydney Zandi 22'; Ashlynn Serepca 35'; Alissa Gorzak 56'	Report		Stadium: Klöckner Stadium; Attendance: 894; Referee: Karl Kummer; Assistant referees: Robert Velvis; Charles Rainey; Fourth official: R. Patrick Stephan

November 17, 2019	Notre Dame	1–0	Saint Louis	Notre Dame, Indiana
1:00 pm EST	Kiki Van Zanten 40'	Report	(yellow card) 49' Alyssa Seitzer	Stadium: Alumni Stadium; Attendance: 463; Referee: Nicholas Balcer; Assistant referees: Kyle Hannon; Carlos Leyva; Fourth official: Jorge Cuate

===== Second round =====
November 22, 2019	#11 Kansas	3–0	#24 Xavier	Columbia, South Carolina
2:00 p.m. EST	Katie McClure 4', 18', 47'	Report	(yellow card) 65' Halle Rogers; (yellow card) 68' Molly McLaughlin	Stadium: Stone Stadium; Attendance: 268; Referee: Mark Buda; Assistant referees: Zachary McWhorter; Howard Ash; Fourth official: Robert Sibiga

November 22, 2019	West Virginia	1–0 (a.e.t.)	Central Connecticut	Charlottesville, Virginia
5:00 p.m.	Alina Stahl 105'	Report	(yellow card) 38' Tess Atkinson; (yellow card) 52' Erica Bardes	Stadium: Klöckner Stadium; Attendance: 609; Referee: Carmen Serbio; Assistant referees: Nicholas Furnish; Brendan Orino; Fourth official: James McKean

November 22, 2019	#5 South Carolina	1–0	Notre Dame	Columbia, South Carolina
6:00 p.m. EST	Riley Tanner 40'	Report	(yellow card) 51' Jenna Winebrenner	Stadium: Stone Stadium; Attendance: 1,301; Referee: Tori Penso; Assistant referees: Brian Miller; Eric Usher; Fourth official: Dallas Rosier

November 22, 2019	#3 Virginia	2–3	Washington State	Charlottesville, Virginia
7:00 p.m. EST	Diana Ordóñez 18'; Meghan McCool 52'	Report	12' Averie Collins; 30' Morgan Weaver; 81' MacKenzie Frimpong-Ellertson	Stadium: Klöckner Stadium; Attendance: 960; Referee: Mike Stutt; Assistant referees: Nick Gauck; Jeffrey Skinker; Fourth official: Kevin Uitto

===== Round of 16 =====
November 24, 2019	#5 South Carolina	2–0	#11 Kansas	Columbia, South Carolina
2:00 p.m. EST	Grace Fisk 62', (yellow card) 83'; Riley Tanner 75'	Report	(yellow card) 38' Grace Wiltgen; (yellow card) 83' Bri Amos	Stadium: Stone Stadium; Attendance: 1,023; Referee: Carmen Serbio; Assistant referees: Rick Rodgers; Jon Skinner; Fourth official: Richonne Clark

November 24, 2019	Washington State	3–0	West Virginia	Charlottesville, Virginia
5:00 p.m. EST	Makamae Gomera-Stevens 14', (yellow card) 52'; Morgan Weaver 63', 70'	Report		Stadium: Klöckner Stadium; Attendance: 219; Referee: Dustin Thorne; Assistant referees: Abbas Piran; Jeremy Smith; Fourth official: Michael Donovan

===== Quarterfinals =====
November 29, 2019	#5 South Carolina	0–1 (a.e.t.)	Washington State	Columbia, South Carolina
6:00 p.m. EST		Report	(yellow card) 36' Brianna Alger; (yellow card) 88' Makamae Gomera-Stevens; 95' Mykiaa Minniss	Stadium: Stone Stadium; Attendance: 2,315; Referee: Matthew Thompson; Assistant referees: Justin Howard; Kyle Johnston; Fourth official: Richonne Clark

Rankings from United Soccer Coaches Final Regular Season Rankings

=== North Carolina Bracket ===
First round Campus Sites
2	USC*	5
Cal State Fullerton	1
Texas A&M*	4
Texas	1
Santa Clara* (a.e.t.)	1
California	0
South Dakota State	0
3	Oklahoma State*	1
4	Texas Tech* (a.e.t.)	2 (4)
Pepperdine	2 (3)
Michigan*	2
Bowling Green	1
Colorado*	6
Northern Colorado	0
Belmont	0
1	North Carolina*	5

Second round Regional Campus Sites
2	USC	2
Texas A&M	1
Santa Clara	3
3	Oklahoma State	1
4	Texas Tech	2
Michigan	3
Colorado	0
1	North Carolina	1

Round of 16; Regional Campus Sites
2	USC	1
Santa Clara	0
Michigan	0
1	North Carolina	4

Quarterfinal; Campus Sites
2	USC	2
1	North Carolina	3

* Host institution

==== Schedule ====
===== First round =====
November 15, 2019	#19 Michigan	2–1	Bowling Green	Ann Arbor, Michigan
7:00 pm EST	Danielle Wolfe 64'; Nicki Hernandez 78'	Report	34' Chelsee Washington	Stadium: U-M Soccer Stadium; Referee: Donovan Noocha; Assistant referees: Conlan Campbell; Igor Reznik; Fourth official: Michael Allie

November 15, 2019	#22 Texas A&M	4–1	Texas	College Station, Texas
7:30 pm EST	Taylor Ziemer 23'; Tera Ziemer 43'; Grace Piper 55'; Texas Own Goal 71' (o.g.)	Report	6' Cydney Billups	Stadium: Ellis Field; Attendance: 3,021; Referee: Travis Haight; Assistant referees: Jeremy Weed; Chris Gordon; Fourth official: Asa Adair

November 15, 2019	#15 Texas Tech	2–2 (a.e.t.) (4–3 p)	Pepperdine	Lubbock, Texas
7:30 pm EST	Penelope Mulenga 4'; Jordie Harr 11'; Team (yellow card) 58'	Report	39' Leyla McFarland; 49' (pen.) Joelle Anderson	Stadium: John Walker Soccer Complex; Attendance: 1,145; Referee: Brandon Gardner; Assistant referees: Tony Obas; Reza Namauar; Fourth official: Joel McKell
	Penalties
	Charlotte Teeter (penalty scored); Jordie Harr (penalty missed); Macy Schultz (penalty scored); Amanda Porter (penalty scored); Luana Munoz (penalty scored)		(penalty scored) Trinity Watson; (penalty scored) Tara Morris; (penalty scored) Aliyah Satterfield; (penalty missed) Erin Sinai; (penalty missed) Madi Cook

November 15, 2019	#13 Oklahoma State	1–0	South Dakota State	Stillwater, Oklahoma
8:00 pm EST	Claire Gantzer 68'	Report	(yellow card) 81' Maya Hansen	Stadium: Neal Patterson Stadium; Attendance: 1,410; Referee: Michael Cap; Assistant referees: Seth Barton; Rachel Cap; Fourth official: Jack Damrill

November 16, 2019	Colorado	6–0	Northern Colorado	Boulder, Colorado
2:00 pm EST	Libby Geraghty 28'; Taylor Kornieck 33' (pen.); Roo Yarnell-Williams 46'; Jade Babcock-Chi 67'; Camilla Shymka 83'; Kayla Ferry 86'	Report		Stadium: Prentup Field; Attendance: 1,569; Referee: Adam Zarrin; Assistant referees: Elias Anosov; Jacob Herold; Fourth official: Tomas Habtermicael

November 16, 2019	#9 USC	5–1	Cal State Fullerton	Los Angeles, California
4:00 pm EST	Penelope Hocking 47', 58', 63', 82'; Savianna Gómez 79'	Report	(yellow card) 36' Savannah Sloniger; 71' Atlanta Primus	Stadium: McAlister Field; Attendance: 675; Referee: Israel Fernandez; Assistant referees: Loren Barnett; Andi Reyes; Fourth official: Magic Berenji

November 16, 2019	#20 Santa Clara	1–0 (a.e.t.)	California	Santa Clara, California
4:00 pm EST	Julie Doyle (yellow card) 73', 91'	Report	(yellow card) 49' Kai Henderson	Stadium: Stevens Stadium; Attendance: 1,019; Referee: Christopher Spivey; Assistant referees: Sarah Cotez; Brandom Chapman; Fourth official: Jamie Padilla

November 16, 2019	#2 North Carolina	5–0	Belmont	Chapel Hill, North Carolina
6:00 pm EST	Alessia Russo 21', 53'; Bridgette Andrzejewski 22'; Emily Fox 27'; Ru Mucherera 63'	Report		Stadium: Dorrance Field; Attendance: 1,076; Referee: Dustin Thorne; Assistant referees: Howard Ash; Kevin Maurer; Fourth official: Michael Hill

===== Second round =====
November 22, 2019	#20 Santa Clara	3–1	#13 Oklahoma State	Los Angeles, California
2:00 p.m. EST	Kelsey Turnbow 19'; Julie Doyle 20'; Alex Loera (yellow card) 53'; Izzy D'Aquila 54'	Report	(yellow card) 2' Jaci Jones; (red card) 20' Kim Rodriguez; 88' Gabriella Coleman	Stadium: McAlister Field; Referee: Samantha Martinez; Assistant referees: Brandon Stevis; Jaclyn Reilman; Fourth official: Vincent Di Nardo

November 22, 2019	#15 Texas Tech	2–3	#19 Michigan	Chapel Hill, North Carolina
3:00 p.m. EST	Jayne Lydiatt 21', (yellow card) 87'; Team (yellow card) 23', (yellow card) 34'; Cassie Hiatt (yellow card) 76'; Savanna Jones 88'	Report	7' Sarah Stratigakis; (yellow card) 45' Alia Martin; 62', 83' Danielle Wolfe	Stadium: Dorrance Field; Referee: Mark Kadlecik; Assistant referees: Hudson Owens; Raymond Thomas; Fourth official: Aaron Gallagher

November 22, 2019	#9 USC	2–1	#22 Texas A&M	Los Angeles, California
4:30 p.m. EST	Tara McKeown 6'; Penelope Hocking 32'; Julia Bingham (yellow card) 86'	Report	48' Ally Watt; (yellow card) 86' Jordan Hill	Stadium: McAlister Field; Attendance: 700; Referee: Randy Hoffman; Assistant referees: Hakeem Wakil; Wale Animashaun; Fourth official: Brandom Stevis

November 22, 2019	#2 North Carolina	1–0	Colorado	Chapel Hill, North Carolina
6:00 p.m. EST	Ru Mucherera (yellow card) 33'; Alessia Russo 47'; Julia Dorsey (yellow card) 84'	Report	(yellow card) 11' Stephanie Zuniga	Stadium: Dorrance Field; Attendance: 4,235; Referee: Bill Dittmar; Assistant referees: Jude Carr; Robert Velbis; Fourth official: Erick Varone

===== Round of 16 =====
November 24, 2019	#2 North Carolina	4–0	#19 Michigan	Chapel Hill, North Carolina
1:00 p.m. EST	Isabel Cox 5', 50'; Lotte Wubben-Moy 35'; Zoe Redei 66'	Report		Stadium: Dorrance Field; Attendance: 3,672; Referee: Tori Penso; Assistant referees: Kyle Johnston; Javier Rodriguez; Fourth official: Scott Bowers

November 24, 2019	#9 USC	1–0	#20 Santa Clara	Los Angeles, California
5:00 p.m. EST	Natalie Ward 40'; Kaylin Martin (yellow card) 83'	Report	(yellow card) 84' Team	Stadium: McAlister Field; Attendance: 832; Referee: Rene Nunez; Assistant referees: Salma Perez; Trevor Rappleye; Fourth official: Omeed Azadpour

===== Quarterfinals =====
November 29, 2019	#2 North Carolina	3–2	#9 USC	Chapel Hill, North Carolina
6:00 p.m. EST	Emily Fox 38'; Brianna Pinto 54'; Maycee Bell 68'	Report	16' Penelope Hocking; (yellow card) 57' Samantha Bruder; 61' Natalie Jacobs	Stadium: Dorrance Field; Attendance: 2,655; Referee: Corey Rockwell; Assistant referees: Meghan Mullen; Joshua Escobar; Fourth official: Charles Raney

Rankings from United Soccer Coaches Final Regular Season Rankings

=== College Cup ===
Semifinals; December 6 Avaya Stadium; San Jose, California
2	UCLA	1
1	Stanford	4
1	North Carolina	2
Washington State	1

Final; December 8 Avaya Stadium; San Jose, California
1	North Carolina	0 (4)
1	Stanford (a.e.t.)	0 (5)

==== Schedule ====
===== Semifinals =====
December 6, 2019	#7 UCLA	1–4	#1 Stanford	San Jose, California
4:00 p.m. PST	Chloe Castaneda 6'	Report	8', 30', 51' Sophia Smith; 20' Carly Malatskey	Stadium: Avaya Stadium; Attendance: 7,699; Referee: Ian Anderson; Assistant referees: Deleana Quan; Ryan Graves; Fourth official: Chris Spivey

December 6, 2019	#2 North Carolina	2–1	Washington State	San Jose, California
7:00 p.m. PST	23' Alessia Russo; 37' Alexis Strickland	Report	Morgan Weaver 6'	Stadium: Avaya Stadium; Attendance: 7,699; Referee: Samantha Martinez; Assistant referees: Salma Perez; Sam Bilbo; Fourth official: Chris Spivey

===== Final =====
December 8, 2019	#2 North Carolina	0–0 (a.e.t.) (4–5 p)	#1 Stanford	San Jose, California
5:30 p.m. PST		Report		Stadium: Avaya Stadium; Attendance: 9,591; Referee: Tori Penso; Assistant referees: Deleana Quan; Salma Perez; Fourth official: Sam Bilbo
	Penalties
	Otto (penalty missed); Jones (penalty scored); Dickey (penalty scored); Russo (penalty scored); Wubben-Moy (penalty scored); Hansen (penalty missed)		(penalty scored) Macario; (penalty scored) Smith; (penalty scored) Girma; (penalty missed) Malatskey; (penalty scored) Wesley; (penalty scored) Pickett

Rankings from United Soccer Coaches Final Regular Season Rankings

== Record by conference ==
Conference	Bids	Record	Pct.	R32	R16	QF	SF	F	NC
Pac-12	9	20–8–0	.714	7	4	4	3	1	1
ACC	9	14–8–2	.625	8	3	2	1	1	–
Big 12	6	5–6–1	.458	4	2	–	–	–	–
SEC	5	5–4–1	.550	3	1	1	–	–	–
WCC	3	5–2–1	.688	2	2	1	–	–	–
Big Ten	5	6–5–0	.545	3	3	–	–	–	–
American	2	2–2–0	.500	1	1	–	–	–	–
Big East	2	1–2–0	.333	1	–	–	–	–	–
Ivy	1	0–1–1	.250	1	–	–	–	–	–
CAA	1	1–1–0	.500	1	–	–	–	–	–
Northeast	1	1–1–0	.500	1	–	–	–	–	–
MAAC	1	0–0–1	.500	–	–	–	–	–	–

- The R32, S16, E8, F4, CG, and NC columns indicate how many teams from each conference were in the Round of 32 (second round), Round of 16 (third round), Quarterfinals, Semifinals, Final, and National Champion, respectively.
- The following conferences received one bid and finished the tournament with a record of 0–1–0: A10, America East, ASUN, Big Sky, Big South, Big West, C-USA, Horizon, MAC, Mountain West, MVC, OVC, Patriot, SoCon, Summit, Sun Belt, Southland, SWAC, WAC. In the interest of conserving space, these teams are not shown in the table.

== Statistics ==
=== Goalscorers ===
There were 192 goals scored in 63 matches, for an average of 3.05 goals per match.

9 goals

- (United States) Catarina Macario – Stanford

7 goals

- (United States) Sophia Smith – Stanford

6 goals

- (United States) Penelope Hocking – USC

5 goals

- (United States) Cameron Tucker – BYU
- (Canada) Evelyne Viens – South Florida
- (United States) Mia Fishel – UCLA

4 goals

- (United States) Kristen McFarland – Florida State
- (England) Alessia Russo – North Carolina
- (United States) Morgan Weaver – Washington State

3 goals

- (United States) Katie McClure – Kansas
- (United States) Danielle Wolfe – Michigan
- (United States) Sam Coffey – Penn State
- (Panama) Riley Tanner – South Carolina
- (United States) Bianca Caetano-Ferrara – Stanford
- (United States) Sam Tran – Stanford
- (United States) Chloe Castaneda – UCLA
- (United States) Alina Stahl – West Virginia

2 goals

- (United States) Tori Cannata – Arkansas
- (United States) Mikayla Colohan – BYU
- (United States) Elise Flake – BYU
- (United States) Emmy Duerr – Duke
- (Germany) Lulu Guttenberger – NC State
- (United States) Isabel Cox – North Carolina
- (United States) Emily Fox – North Carolina
- (United States) Frankie Tagliaferri – Penn State
- (United States) Julie Doyle – Santa Clara
- (United States) Kiki Pickett – Stanford
- (United States) Kali Trevithick – UCLA
- (United States) Makamae Gomera-Stevens – Washington State
- (United States) Dani Rhodes – Wisconsin

1 goal

- (Puerto Rico) Jill Aguilera – Arizona
- (United States) Brynn Moga – Arizona
- (United States) Grace Santos – Arizona
- (United States) Iyana Zimmerman – Arizona
- (United States) Parker Goins – Arkansas
- (United States) Kaelee Van Gundy – Arkansas
- (United States) Emily Curry – Boise State
- (United States) Chelsee Washington – Bowling Green
- (United States) SaraJayne Affleck – BYU
- (United States) Josie Guinn – BYU
- (United States) Danika Serassio – BYU
- (United States) Jamie Shepherd – BYU
- (Jamaica) Atlanta Primus – Cal State Fullerton
- (United States) Erica Bardes – Central Connecticut
- (United States) Jade Babcock-Chi – Colorado
- (United States) Kyla Ferry – Colorado
- (United States) Libby Geraghty – Colorado
- (United States) Taylor Kornieck – Colorado
- (Canada) Camilla Shymka – Colorado
- (United States) Roo Yarnell-Williams – Colorado
- (United States) Tess Boade – Duke
- (United States) Mackenzie Pluck – Duke
- (England) Georgia Eaton-Collins – Florida
- (Canada) Deanne Rose – Florida
- (Venezuela) Deyna Castellanos – Florida State
- (United States) Jaelin Howell – Florida State
- (United States) Sabrina Bryan – Hofstra
- (United States) Kailey Lane – Kansas
- (England) Lucy Ashworth – Lamar
- (United States) Sarah Hernandez – Louisville
- (Mexico) Nicki Hernandez – Michigan
- (Canada) Sarah Stratigakis – Michigan
- (United States) Leyah Hall-Robinson – NC State
- (United States) Kia Rankin – NC State
- (United States) Anna Toohey – NC State
- (United States) Bridgette Andrzejewski – North Carolina
- (United States) Maycee Bell – North Carolina
- (Zimbabwe) Ru Mucherera – North Carolina
- (United States) Brianna Pinto – North Carolina
- (United States) Zoe Redei – North Carolina
- (United States) Alexis Strickland – North Carolina
- (England) Lotte Wubben-Moy – North Carolina
- (Jamaica) Kiki Van Zanten – Notre Dame
- (United States) Gabriella Coleman – Oklahoma State
- (United States) Claire Gantzer – Oklahoma State
- (United States) Kerry Abello – Penn State
- (United States) Ally Schlegel – Penn State
- (United States) Joelle Anderson – Pepperdine
- (United States) Leyla McFarland – Pepperdine
- (United States) Izzy D'Aquila – Santa Clara
- (United States) Kelsey Turnbow – Santa Clara
- (Canada) Samantha Chang – South Carolina
- (England) Grace Fisk – South Carolina
- (United States) Luciana Zullo – South Carolina
- (United States) Aubrey Megrath – South Florida
- (Canada) Fanny Pelletier-Laroche – South Florida
- (United States) Maya Doms – Stanford
- (United States) Abby Greubel – Stanford
- (United States) Madison Haley – Stanford
- (United States) Jojo Harber – Stanford
- (United States) Carly Malatskey – Stanford
- (Sweden) Fanny Götesson – Stony Brook
- (United States) Cydney Billups – Texas
- (United States) Grace Piper – Texas A&M
- (United States) Ally Watt – Texas A&M
- (United States) Taylor Ziemer – Texas A&M
- (United States) Tera Ziemer – Texas A&M
- (United States) Jordie Harr – Texas Tech
- (United States) Savanna Jones – Texas Tech
- (United States) Jayne Lydiatt – Texas Tech
- (Canada) Penelope Mulenga – Texas Tech
- (Canada) Jessie Fleming – UCLA
- (England) Lucy Parker – UCLA
- (Mexico) Maricarmen Reyes – UCLA
- (United States) Ashley Sanchez – UCLA
- (United States) Delanie Sheehan – UCLA
- (United States) Viviana Villacorta – UCLA
- (Guatemala) Savianna Gómez – USC
- (United States) Natalie Jacobs – USC
- (United States) Tara McKeown – USC
- (United States) Natalie Ward – USC
- (United States) Alissa Gorzak – Virginia
- (United States) Meghan McCool – Virginia
- (Mexico) Diana Ordóñez – Virginia
- (United States) Ashlynn Serepca – Virginia
- (United States) Sydney Zandi – Virginia
- (United States) Shae Holmes – Washington
- (United States) Averie Collins – Washington State
- (United States) MacKenzie Frimpong-Ellertson – Washington State
- (United States) Mykiaa Minniss – Washington State
- (United States) Molly McLaughlin – Xavier

1 own goal

- BYU (against Stanford)
- Texas (against Texas A&M)

== See also ==
- NCAA Women's Soccer Championships (Division II, Division III)
- NCAA Men's Soccer Championships (Division I, Division II, Division III)
