= 2019 BYU Cougars women's soccer team =

American college soccer season

2019 BYU Cougars women's soccer

WCC Champions

2019 NCAA Division I Women's Soccer Tournament, Elite 8
- Conference: West Coast Conference

Ranking
- Coaches: No. 4
- Record: 21–1–1 (8–0–1 WCC)
- Head coach: Jennifer Rockwood (25th season)
- Home stadium: South Stadium

Uniform
| Home | Away |

2019 West Coast Conference women's soccer standings
| | Conf. | | | | | | Overall |
| Team | W | | L | | T | PCT | W | | L | | T | PCT |
|---|---|---|---|---|---|---|---|---|---|---|---|---|
| No. 5 BYU ‍†‍‍^{y} | 8 | – | 0 | – | 1 | .944 | 21 | – | 1 | – | 1 | .935 |
| No. 14 Santa Clara ‍‍‍^{y} | 7 | – | 0 | – | 2 | .889 | 15 | – | 6 | – | 2 | .696 |
| Pepperdine ‍‍‍^{y} | 7 | – | 2 | – | 0 | .778 | 11 | – | 6 | – | 3 | .625 |
| Gonzaga ‍‍‍ | 5 | – | 3 | – | 1 | .611 | 12 | – | 6 | – | 1 | .658 |
| San Diego ‍‍‍ | 4 | – | 5 | – | 0 | .444 | 8 | – | 9 | – | 1 | .472 |
| San Francisco ‍‍‍ | 3 | – | 5 | – | 1 | .389 | 10 | – | 8 | – | 2 | .550 |
| Loyola Marymount ‍‍‍ | 3 | – | 5 | – | 1 | .389 | 4 | – | 12 | – | 3 | .289 |
| Portland ‍‍‍ | 2 | – | 4 | – | 3 | .389 | 6 | – | 6 | – | 5 | .500 |
| Saint Mary's ‍‍‍ | 1 | – | 7 | – | 1 | .167 | 7 | – | 11 | – | 1 | .395 |
| Pacific ‍‍‍ | 0 | – | 9 | – | 0 | .000 | 3 | – | 16 | – | 0 | .158 |
† – Conference champion y – Invited to the NCAA Tournament; As of December 11, 2019; Rankings from United Soccer Coaches Poll; Source:West Coast Conference

The 2019 BYU Cougars women's soccer team represented BYU during the 2019 NCAA Division I women's soccer season. The Cougars were coached for a 25th consecutive season by Jennifer Rockwood, who was co-coach in 1995 and became the solo head coach in 1996. Before 1995 BYU women's soccer competed as a club team and not as a member of the NCAA. Overall the Cougars had made the NCAA tournament in 19 of the 24 seasons that Rockwood had been the head coach. Joining Rockwood as assistant coaches were Brent Anderson (3rd season) and Steve Magleby (2nd season) with volunteer assistants Rachel Jorgensen (6th season) and McKinzie Young (8th season). The Cougars came off of a season where they were first in the WCC and went 13–5–1, 8–1–0 in the WCC. The Cougars were picked to finish as co-champs by the WCC media.

== Media ==
=== Television and internet streaming ===
Most BYU women's soccer will have a TV broadcast or internet video stream available. BYUtv and WCC Network (the new name for TheW.tv) will once again serve as the primary providers. Information on these television broadcasts can be found under each individual match.

=== Nu Skin BYU Sports Network ===
For a sixth consecutive season the BYU Sports Network will air BYU Cougars women's soccer games. Greg Wrubell will provide play-by-play for most games with Jason Shepherd filling-in when Wrubell has football duties. Analysts will rotate. ESPN 960 and BYU Radio will act as the flagship stations for women's soccer.

Affiliates

- BYU Radio- KUMT 107.9 FM
- ESPN 960- Provo, Utah

== Schedule ==
- WCC game (*)
- Nu Skin BYU Sports Network/ESPN 960 broadcast (x)
- Television Broadcast (y)
- Internet Stream (z)

=== Exhibition: Blue/White Game ===
- Three 30 minute periods made up the exhibition. Coaches were also free to move players from the Blue to the White and vice versa as it was an inter-squad match.

| August 10, 2019 | BYU White | 2–7 | BYU Blue | Provo, UT |
| 7:00 p.m. MDT | Kendell Peterson 7'; Cameron Tucker 54' | Recap | Lizzy Braby 25'; Ellie Maughan 39'; Mikayala Colohan 62', 63', 77'; Elise Flake 71'; Natalie Clark 82' | Stadium: South Field; Attendance: N/A; Referee: Marcelo Chaparro; Assistant referees: Jordan Downs; German Hortal |

=== x-Exhibition: Colorado College ===
Broadcasters: Greg Wrubell & Avery Walker (ESPN 960)

| August 17, 2019 | BYU Cougars | 4–0 | Colorado College Tigers | Provo, UT |
| 7:00 p.m. MDT | Elise Flake 47', 60'; Alyssa Jefferson 73'; Makaylie Moore 81' | Recap | | Stadium: South Field; Attendance: 1,198; Referee: Not listed |

=== xz-Alabama ===
Series History: First Meeting
Broadcasters: Gray Robertson & Hayley MacDonald (SEC+)
Greg Wrubell & Avery Walker (BYUR 107.9 FM/ESPN 960)

| August 22, 2019 | Alabama Crimson Tide | 0–1 | BYU Cougars | Tuscaloosa, AL |
| 7:00 p.m. CDT | Casey Wertz (yellow card) 42'; Nealy Martin (yellow card) 78'; Abby Bivens (yellow card) 87' | Recap | Mikayala Colohan 9'; Rachel Lyman (yellow card) 85' | Stadium: Alabama Soccer Stadium; Attendance: 805; Referee: Elvis Mahmutovic; Assistant referees: Sam Bierster; Hasin Ghandakwala; Fourth official: Eric Zimmer |

=== xz-Mississippi State ===
Series History: First Meeting
Broadcasters: Anthony Craven & Chris Nasuti (SEC+)
Greg Wrubell & Avery Walker (BYUR 107.9 FM/ESPN 960)

| August 24, 2019 | Mississippi State Bulldogs | 1–2 | BYU Cougars | Starkville, MS |
| 7:00 p.m. CDT | Niah Johnson 65' | Recap | Elise Flake 21'; Mikayla Colohan 85' | Stadium: MSU Soccer Field; Attendance: 513; Referee: Tori Penso; Assistant referees: Sam Bilbo; Louie Tran; Fourth official: Rhiannon Daugs |

=== xz-Southern Utah ===
Series History: BYU leads series 2–0–0
Broadcasters: Greg Wrubell & Avery Walker (WCC Network & BYUR 107.9 FM/ESPN 960)

| August 30, 2019 | #14 BYU Cougars | 7–0 | Southern Utah Thunderbirds | Provo, UT |
| 8:00 p.m. MDT | Josie Guinn 19'; Ashton Brockbank 44', 88'; Elise Flake 50', 60'; Lizzy Braby 67'; Ella Ballstaedt 84' | Recap | Brianna Sims (yellow card) 64' | Stadium: South Field; Attendance: 4,172; Referee: Joe Pickens; Assistant referees: Schuysler Pack; Mike Anglin; Fourth official: Marcelo Chaparro |

=== xy-Utah ===
Game Name: Deseret First Duel
Series History: BYU leads series 22–7–2
Broadcasters: Jarom Jordan & Carla Haslam (BYUtv)
Jason Shepherd & Avery Walker (BYUR 107.9 FM/ESPN 960)

| September 6, 2019 | #10 BYU Cougars | 2–0 | Utah Utes | Provo, UT |
| 7:00 p.m. MDT | Elise Flake 20'; Cameron Tucker 64' | Recap | | Stadium: South Field; Attendance: 5,036; Referee: Adrian Gonzales; Assistant referees: Daniel Spicer Escalante; Allen Pickett; Fourth official: Sergio Navas |

=== xy-Texas A&M ===
Series History: Texas A&M leads series 1–0–0
Broadcasters: Spencer Linton & Carla Haslam (BYUtv)
Greg Wrubell & Avery Walker (BYUR 107.9 FM/ESPN 960)

| September 12, 2019 | #10 BYU Cougars | 2–0 | #12 Texas A&M Aggies | Provo, UT |
| 7:00 p.m. MDT | Elise Flake 34', 37' | Recap | | Stadium: South Field; Attendance: 3,712; Referee: Corbyn May; Assistant referees: Karsten Gillwald; Sly Yeates; Fourth official: Blake Griffiths |

=== xz-Utah Valley ===
Game Name: UCCU Crosstown Clash
Series History: BYU leads series 4–0–0
Broadcasters: Brandon Crow & Melanie Perkins (UVUtv/WAC DN)
Greg Wrubell & Avery Walker (BYUR 107.9 FM/ESPN 960)

| September 16, 2019 | Utah Valley Wolverines | 0–1 | #10 BYU Cougars | Orem, UT |
| 7:30 p.m. MDT | Sadie Brockbank (yellow card) 60' | Recap | Jamie Shepherd (yellow card) 32' (yellow-red card) 68'; Danika Serassio 64'; Kendell Peterson (yellow card) 87' | Stadium: Clyde Field; Attendance: 3,952; Referee: Alex Krelo; Assistant referees: Sergio Navas; Brandon Major; Fourth official: Spencer Stolworthy |

=== xz-Kansas ===
Series History: BYU leads series 3–1–1
Broadcasters: Josh Klingler & Huw Williams (ESPN+)
Greg Wrubell & Avery Walker (BYUR 107.9 FM/ESPN 960)

| September 19, 2019 | #14 Kansas Jayhawks | 0–2 | #7 BYU Cougars | Lawrence, KS |
| 7:05 p.m. CDT | | Recap | Rachel McCarthy (yellow card) 44'; Elise Flake 46'; Mikayla Colohan 48' | Stadium: Rock Chalk Park; Attendance: 722; Referee: Lance VanHaitsma; Assistant referees: Jacob Post; Mark Cahen; Fourth official: Shane Butler |

=== xz-Kansas State ===
Series History: First Meeting
Broadcasters: James Westling, Oscar Montenegro, & Anna Christianson (ESPN+)
Jason Shepherd & Avery Walker (BYUR 107.9 FM/ESPN 960)

| September 21, 2019 | Kansas State Wildcats | 0–5 | #7 BYU Cougars | Manhattan, KS |
| 6:00 p.m. CDT | | Recap | Cameron Tucker 5', 48', 59'; Mikayla Colohan 70'; Kendell Petersen 85' (pen.) | Stadium: Buser Family Park; Attendance: 796; Referee: Marco Vega; Assistant referees: Kelly McLean; Ousmane Diop; Fourth official: Jamie Willis |

=== xz-Long Beach State ===
Series History: BYU leads series 7–3–0
Broadcasters: Jacob Hughey & Carlos Hernandez (Big West TV)
Greg Wrubell & BJ Pugmire (BYUR 107.9 FM/ESPN 960)

| September 26, 2019 | Long Beach State 49ers | 0–3 | #5 BYU Cougars | Long Beach, CA |
| 7:00 p.m. PDT | | Recap | Ellie Maughan 55'; Elise Flake 60'; Ella Ballstaedt 85' | Stadium: George Allen Field; Attendance: 721; Referee: Adrian Gonzales; Assistant referees: Israel Fernandez; Melissa Gonzales; Fourth official: Alex Estrada |

=== xy-UC Irvine ===
Series History: BYU leads series 3–1–0
Broadcasters: Jarom Jordan & Carla Haslam (BYUtv)
Jason Shepherd & Avery Walker (BYUR 107.9 FM/ESPN 960)

| September 28, 2019 | #5 BYU Cougars | 4–2 | UC Irvine Anteaters | Provo, UT |
| 7:00 p.m. MDT | Ashton Brockbank (yellow card) 34'; Mikayla Colohan 38', 75'; Elise Flake 68'; Rachel McCarthy 82' | Recap | Kyndal McKinney 2'; Kala McDaniel (yellow card) 26'; Maddie Newsom (yellow card) 54'; Jessica Miclat (yellow card) 56'; Alex Jaquez (yellow card) 56'; Piper Wurth (yellow card) 71'; Jessica Miclat 81' | Stadium: South Field; Attendance: 3,490; Referee: Victor Mba; Assistant referees: Sly Yeates; Karsten Gillwald; Fourth official: Mitch Lillywhite |

=== xz-Santa Clara* ===
Series History: Santa Clara leads series 7–2–4
Broadcasters: David Gentile (WCC Network)
Greg Wrubell & Avery Walker (ESPN 960)

| October 5, 2019 | Santa Clara Broncos | 2–2 | #4 BYU Cougars | Santa Clara, CA |
| 1:00 p.m. PDT | Kelcie Hedge 6'; Maddy Gonzales 34' | Recap | Ashton Brockbank 42'; Cameron Tucker 68' | Stadium: Stevens Stadium; Attendance: 780; Referee: Ian Anderson; Assistant referees: Joel Linn; Jorge Ruiz; Fourth official: Iryna Petrunok |

=== xz-Pepperdine* ===
Series History: Pepperdine leads series 6–4–0
Broadcasters: Spencer Linton, Brian Dunseth, & Jason Shepherd (byutv.org)
Greg Wrubell & Avery Walker (BYUR 107.9 FM/ESPN 960)

| October 9, 2019 | #6 BYU Cougars | 5–1 | Pepperdine Waves | Provo, UT |
| 7:00 p.m. MDT | Sara Affleck 4'; Elise Flake 12', 22'; Lizzy Braby 49'; Mikayla Colohan 54'; Alyssa Jefferson (yellow card) 56' | Recap | Shelby Little 42' | Stadium: South Field; Attendance: 2,099; Referee: Daniel Redford; Assistant referees: Alan Jimenez; Allen Pickett; Fourth official: German Hortal |

=== xy-Pacific* ===
Series History: BYU leads series 6–1–0
Broadcasters: Jarom Jordan & Carla Haslam (BYUtv)
Jason Shepherd & Avery Walker (BYUR 107.9 FM/ESPN 960)

| October 12, 2019 | #6 BYU Cougars | 6–0 | Pacific Tigers | Provo, UT |
| 7:00 p.m. MDT | Mikayla Colohan 3'; Cameron Tucker 30'; Lizzy Braby 31'; Sara Affleck 69'; Ashton Brockbank 73'; Makaylie Moore 80' | Recap | Nikki Lee (yellow card) 55'; Erin Brown (yellow card) 63' | Stadium: South Field; Attendance: 2,292; Referee: Alejandro Aguilera; Assistant referees: Marcelo Chaparro; Jacob Downs; Fourth official: Schuyler Pack |

=== xz-Saint Mary's* ===
Series History: BYU leads series 8–0–1
Broadcasters: Greg Wrubell & Elena Medeiros (WCC Network & BYUR 107.9 FM/ESPN 960)

| October 18, 2019 | #5 BYU Cougars | 8–0 | Saint Mary's Gaels | Provo, UT |
| 7:00 p.m. MDT | Cameron Tucker 27'; Mikayla Colohan 31', 59'; Elise Flake 32', 52'; Ellie Maughan 43'; Ella Ballstaedt 89' Lytiana Akinaka 90' | Recap | | Stadium: South Field; Attendance: 2,649; Referee: Travis Haight; Assistant referees: Max Thomas; Daniel Escalante; Fourth official: Brandon Major |

=== xz-Portland* ===
Series History: BYU leads series 9–4–0
Broadcasters: Tom Kolker (WCC Network)
Greg Wrubell & Elena Medeiros (BYUR 107.9 FM/ESPN 960)

| October 23, 2019 | Portland Pilots | 0–2 | #4 BYU Cougars | Portland, OR |
| 7:00 p.m. PDT | | Recap | Elise Flake 20'; Ashton Brockbank 32' | Stadium: Merlo Field; Attendance: 2,914; Referee: Noah Kenyawani; Assistant referees: Ian Miller; Stephanie Tercero; Fourth official: Miles Crumley |

=== xy-San Diego* ===
Series History: BYU leads series 8–3–0
Broadcasters: Spencer Linton & Carla Haslam (BYUtv)
Greg Wrubell & Elena Medeiros (BYUR 107.9 FM/ESPN 960)

| October 26, 2019 | #4 BYU Cougars | 3–1 | San Diego Toreros | Provo, UT |
| 7:00 p.m. MDT | Mikayla Colohan 13'; Cameron Tucker 20'; Elise Flake 47' | Recap | Milan Moses 12'; Bekah Valdez (yellow card) 65'; Halle Walls (yellow card) 77' | Stadium: South Field; Attendance: 2,570; Referee: Megan McCain; Assistant referees: Sly Yeates; Sergio Navas; Fourth official: German Hortal |

=== xz–San Francisco* ===
Series History: BYU leads series 7–2–0
Broadcasters: Pat Olson & Jim Duggan (WCC Network)
Jason Shepherd & Avery Walker (BYUR 107.9 FM/ESPN 960)

| November 2, 2019 | San Francisco Dons | 1–2 | #4 BYU Cougars | San Francisco, CA |
| 7:00 p.m. PDT | Ashley Humphrey 80' | | Elise Flake 57'; SaraJayne Affleck 102' | Stadium: Negoesco Stadium; Attendance: 1,000; Referee: Jorge Luna Hernandez; Assistant referees: George Efthymiou; Victor Mba; Fourth official: Iryna Petrunok |

=== xz-Gonzaga* ===
Series History: BYU leads series 11–0–0
Broadcasters: Mark (WCC Network)
Greg Wrubell & Elena Medeiros (BYUR 107.9 FM/ESPN 960)

| November 6, 2019 | Gonzaga Bulldogs | 0–3 | #4 BYU Cougars | Spokane, WA |
| 7:00 p.m. PST | | Recap | Jamie Shepherd 25'; Elise Flake 20'; Mikayla Colohan 39' | Stadium: Gonzaga Soccer Field; Attendance: 1,104; Referee: Alex Marquand-Willse; Assistant referees: Seth Caba; Carson Ellis; Fourth official: Jason Damschen |

=== xz-Loyola Marymount* ===
Series History: BYU leads series 8–1–1
Broadcasters: Jason Shepherd & Avery Walker (WCC Network & BYUR 107.9 FM/ESPN 960)

| November 9, 2019 | #4 BYU Cougars | 8–1 | Loyola Marymount Lions | Provo, UT |
| 7:00 p.m. MST | Elise Flake 4'; Ella Ballstaedt 5'; Mikayla Colohan 18', 50'; Danika Serassio 25'; Lizzy Braby 26', 59'; Ashton Brockbank 66' | | Sydney Schultz 7' | Stadium: South Field; Attendance: 3,161; Referee: Brandon Gardner; Assistant referees: Allen Pickett; Jordan Downs; Fourth official: Karsten Gillwald |

=== xy-NCAA 1st Round: Boise State ===
Series History: First Meeting
Broadcasters: Spencer Linton & Carla Haslam (BYUtv)
Greg Wrubell & Avery Walker (BYUR 107.9 FM)

| November 15, 2019 | #4 BYU Cougars | 5–1 | Boise State Broncos | Provo, UT |
| 6:00 p.m. MST | Cameron Tucker 19', 20'; Jamie Shepherd 54'; SaraJayne Affleck 64'; Elise Flake 67'; Laveni Vaka (yellow card) 72' | Recap | Emily Curry 22'; Kristina Serres (yellow card) 59' | Stadium: South Field; Attendance: 3,682; Referee: Younes Marrakchi; Assistant referees: Karsten Gillwald; Adam Mueller; Fourth official: Scott Conner |

=== xy-NCAA 2nd Round: Louisville ===
Series History: First Meeting
Broadcasters: Spencer Linton, Carla Haslam, & Jason Shepherd (BYUtv)
Greg Wrubell & Avery Walker (BYUR 107.9 FM)

| November 21, 2019 | #4 BYU Cougars | 4–0 | #23 Louisville Cardinals | Provo, UT |
| 6:00 p.m. MST | Elise Flake 62'; Mikayla Colohan 63', 82' (pen.); Mikayla Colohan (yellow card) 65'; Cameron Tucker 68' | Recap | Jessica De Filippo (yellow card) 86' | Stadium: South Field; Attendance: 2,476; Referee: Adam Zarrin; Assistant referees: Karsten Gillwald; Lauren Parliment; Fourth official: Thomas Habtemicael |

=== xy-NCAA Sweet 16: NC State ===
Series History: First Meeting
Broadcasters: Jarom Jordan & Carla Haslam (BYUtv)
Jason Shepherd & Avery Walker (BYUR 107.9 FM)

| November 23, 2019 | #4 BYU Cougars | 3–0 | NC State Wolfpack | Provo, UT |
| 6:00 p.m. MST | Cameron Tucker 12', 49'; Josie Guinn 34' | | | Stadium: South Field; Attendance: 3,629; Referee: Brad Jensen; Assistant referees: Joe Pickens; Kastriot Baruni; Fourth official: Hamed Sadeghi |

=== xy-NCAA Elite 8: Stanford ===
Series History: Stanford leads series 4–3
Broadcasters: Troy Clardy & Joaquin Wallace (P12+ STAN)
Greg Wrubell & Avery Walker (BYUR 107.9 FM/ESPN 960)

| November 29, 2019 | #1 Stanford Cardinal | 5–1 | #4 BYU Cougars | Stanford, CA |
| 3:00 p.m. PST | Catarina Macario 17', 30'; Kiara Pickett 41'; Sam Tran 43'; Team (Own Goal) 54' | Recap | Rachel Lyman (yellow card) 42'; Danika Serassio 64'; Natalie Clark (yellow card) 76' | Stadium: Maloney Field at Laird Q. Cagan Stadium; Attendance: 2,041; Referee: Adrian Gonzales; Assistant referees: Isai Baltezar; Christopher Elliott; Fourth official: Jamie Padilla |

== Roster ==
| No. | Position | Player | Height | Hometown | Year |
|---|---|---|---|---|---|
| 2 | MF, F | Olivia Smith | 5'6" | Eagle, ID | Freshman |
| 3 | MF, F | Makaylie Moore | 5'5" | Auburn, WA | Junior |
| 4 | MF, F | Lizzy Braby | 5'2" | Murray, UT | Senior |
| 5 | F | Elise Flake | 5'7" | Mapleton, UT | Senior |
| 6 | MF | Ashton Brockbank | 5'9" | Provo, UT | Sophomore |
| 7 | D | Danika Serassio | 5'7" | Redlands, CA | Senior |
| 8 | MF | Mikayla Colohan | 5'8" | Fruit Heights, UT | Junior |
| 9 | D | SaraJayne Affleck | 5'4" | Laguna Hills, CA | Freshman |
| 11 | MF, F | Ellie Maughan | 5'6" | Midway, UT | Junior |
| 12 | MF | Jamie Shepherd | 5'7" | American Fork, UT | Freshman |
| 13 | F | Lytiana Akinaka | 5'6" | Haiku, HI | Sophomore |
| 14 | F, D | Josie Guinn | 5'5" | Murrieta, CA | Junior |
| 15 | D | Zoe Jacobs | 5'3" | Kaysville, UT | Freshman |
| 16 | MF, F | Kendell Petersen | 5'8" | South Weber, UT | Freshman |
| 18 | GK | Sabrina Davis | 5'5" | Littleton, CO | RS Senior |
| 19 | F | Natalie Clark | 5'8" | Mesa, AZ | Sophomore |
| 20 | F | Cameron Tucker | 5'9" | Highland, UT | Junior |
| 21 | F | Ella Ballstaedt | 5'6" | Midway, UT | Senior |
| 22 | MF | Bella Folino | 5'6" | Aliso Viejo, CA | Sophomore |
| 23 | MF | Rachel Bingham Lyman | 5'7" | Spanish Fork, UT | RS Senior |
| 24 | F, D | Josie Bush | 5'2" | Boise, ID | Sophomore |
| 25 | D | Brynlee Buhler | 5'4" | Hyrum, UT | RS Junior |
| 26 | D | Laveni Vaka | 5'6" | Sandy, UT | Freshman |
| 27 | F | Daviana Vaka | 5'7" | Sandy, UT | Freshman |
| 28 | D | Alyssa Jefferson | 5'5" | Sandy, UT | Senior |
| 29 | GK | Josie Manwill | 5'9" | Layton, UT | Junior |
| 30 | MF | Ellie Smith | 5'9" | Alpine, UT | Freshman |
| 32 | GK | Cassidy Smith | 5'9" | Alpine, UT | RS Junior |
| 33 | MF, F | Rachel McCarthy | 5'7" | American Fork, UT | Freshman |

== Rankings ==
| + Regular season polls | Poll | Pre- Season | Week 1 | Week 2 | Week 3 | Week 4 | Week 5 | Week 6 | Week 7 | Week 8 | Week 9 | Week 10 | Week 11 | Week 12 Postseason | Final |
| United Soccer Coaches | RV | 14 | 10 | 10 | 7 | 5 | 4 | 6 | 5 | 4 | 4 | 4 | 4 | | |
| Soccer America | NR | 25 | 23 | 18 | 9 | 8 | 6 | 7 | 6 | 5 | 4 | 4 | 4 | | |
| Top Drawer Soccer | 22 | 14 | 12 | 12 | 7 | 7 | 5 | 7 | 5 | 4 | 4 | 4 | 4 | | |

Legend
| | Increase in ranking |
| | Decrease in ranking |
| | Not ranked previous week |
| (RV) | Received Votes |
