= Alissa Gorzak =

American soccer player

Personal information
- Full name: Alissa Marie Gorzak
- Date of birth: 1997 or 1998 (age 28–29)
- Height: 5 ft 6 in (1.68 m)
- Position: Forward

Youth career
- Eclipse Select

College career
Years	Team	Apps	(Gls)
2016–2020	Virginia Cavaliers	83	(5)

International career^{‡}
2016	United States U18	1	(0)
- ‡ National team caps and goals as of March 3, 2016

Alissa Marie Gorzak is an American former soccer player who played as a forward. She played college soccer for the Virginia Cavaliers before being selected by the Chicago Red Stars in the fourth round of the 2021 NWSL Draft.

== Early life ==
Gorzak grew up in Naperville, Illinois. She attended Naperville Central High School, where her performances on the soccer field earned her recognition as a two-time NSCAA Youth All-American. She also ran track and posted strong performances in sprints and the long jump despite only training two days a week. While in high school, Gorzak played club soccer for Eclipse Select SC. She contributed to multiple youth national championships and netted the game-winning goal in the 2013 national semifinals.

== College career ==
Gorzak was invited to the University of Virginia, University of Notre Dame and University of Tennessee on official visits, ultimately opting to commit to the Virginia Cavaliers near the end of her sophomore year of high school. Her freshman season with Virginia was her most successful, with Gorzak earning third-team All-ACC and ACC all-freshman team honors. She made her collegiate debut on August 19, 2016, against Liberty, and tallied an assist in the same game. On September 4, she recorded her first college goal, scoring a close-range chip against Pepperdine. She started all but one of the Cavaliers' 21 matches on the season, registering 1 goal and 4 assists. Six games into her sophomore season in 2017, Gorzak picked up the first major injury of her career, tearing her ACL and missing the rest of the year.

Upon returning from her injury in 2018, Gorzak played in 54 of Virginia's 56 possible games over the next three seasons. She was mostly used a substitute for the remainder of her career, making 13 starts in that time. As a senior in 2019, she was called on to start the final 3 games of the Cavaliers' season. She scored her first goal of the year on November 16, 2019, in Virginia's NCAA tournament opener against Radford. Gorzak finished her collegiate career (which included a fifth year made possible by the COVID-19 pandemic) with 5 goals and 13 assists in 82 appearances.

== Club career ==
The Chicago Red Stars selected Gorzak in the fourth round of the 2021 NWSL Draft (35th overall). The head coach of the Red Stars at that time, Rory Dames, had coached Gorzak at Eclipse Select SC in her youth. She attended the Red Stars' 2021 preseason training camp, but did not make the team's final roster.

== International career ==
In March 2013, Gorzak was called up to a United States under-17 national team training camp, but was not subsequently selected to join the team at the 2013 CONCACAF U-17 Championship. In January 2014, she was called up the U17s again. Later that year, at age 16, Gorzak was called up to the under-20 national team, making her one of the youngest players on the roster. She continued to earn invitations to U19 and U20 camps through 2015.

On February 22, 2016, Gorzak was named to the under-18 roster that competed in the La Manga Cup in Spain the following month. She started the final game of the tournament, a scoreless draw with Denmark.

== Personal life ==
Following the conclusion of her soccer career, Gorzak has worked as a Speech–language pathologist in Wheaton, Illinois. She earned a Master of Science at Midwestern University.

== Honors and awards ==
Individual

- Third-team All-ACC: 2016
- ACC All-freshman team: 2016
