= Savianna Gómez =

Guatemalan footballer (born 2001)

Personal information
- Full name: Savianna Gómez Morán
- Date of birth: 12 February 2001 (age 25)
- Place of birth: Torrance, California, U.S.
- Height: 1.56 m (5 ft 1 in)
- Position: Attacking midfielder

Youth career
- Beach Futbol Club
- LA Galaxy

College career
Years	Team	Apps	(Gls)
2019–2021	USC Trojans	15	(2)

Senior career*
Years	Team	Apps	(Gls)
2022–2023	Suchitepéquez		
2023	Querétaro	6	(0)
2023–2024	Club Puebla	30	(10)
2024	AS FAR	2	(1)
2024–	?	0	(0)

International career^{‡}
2016–2017	United States U17		
2022–	Guatemala	5	(0)
- * Club domestic league appearances and goals as of 2 July 2024 ‡ National team caps and goals as of 23 July 2023

Savianna Gómez Morán (born 12 February 2001) is a professional footballer who plays as a midfielder.

Born in the United States, she represents Guatemala at international level.

== Early life ==
Gómez was born in California to Guatemalan parents Carlos and Sandra, the second of four children. She played youth soccer for Beach Futbol Club in Torrance, and later for LA Galaxy's girls' academy.

== Club career ==
=== C.D. Suchitepéquez ===
In July 2022, Gómez signed with National Women's Football League of Guatemala team C.D. Suchitepéquez, winning the Apertura 2022 title.

=== Querétaro F.C. ===
In February 2023, Gómez signed with Liga MX Femenil team Querétaro F.C. on a five-month contract.

=== Club Puebla ===
In July 2023, Gómez signed with Club Puebla.

== International career ==
As a youth player, Gómez was called up to training camps with the United States under-15 and under-17 national teams.

In April 2022, Gómez made her first appearance for Guatemala as a substitute in a 2–1 friendly loss to Saint Kitts and Nevis.

Gómez was a member of the Guatemalan squad that competed under Centro Caribe Sports' banner at the 2023 Central American and Caribbean Games, due to Guatemala's suspension by the International Olympic Committee.

== Honours ==
C.D. Suchitepéquez

- National Women's League of Guatemala: Apertura 2022

AS FAR

- UNAF Women's Champions League: 2024
