= Samia Fikri =

Moroccan footballer (born 1999)

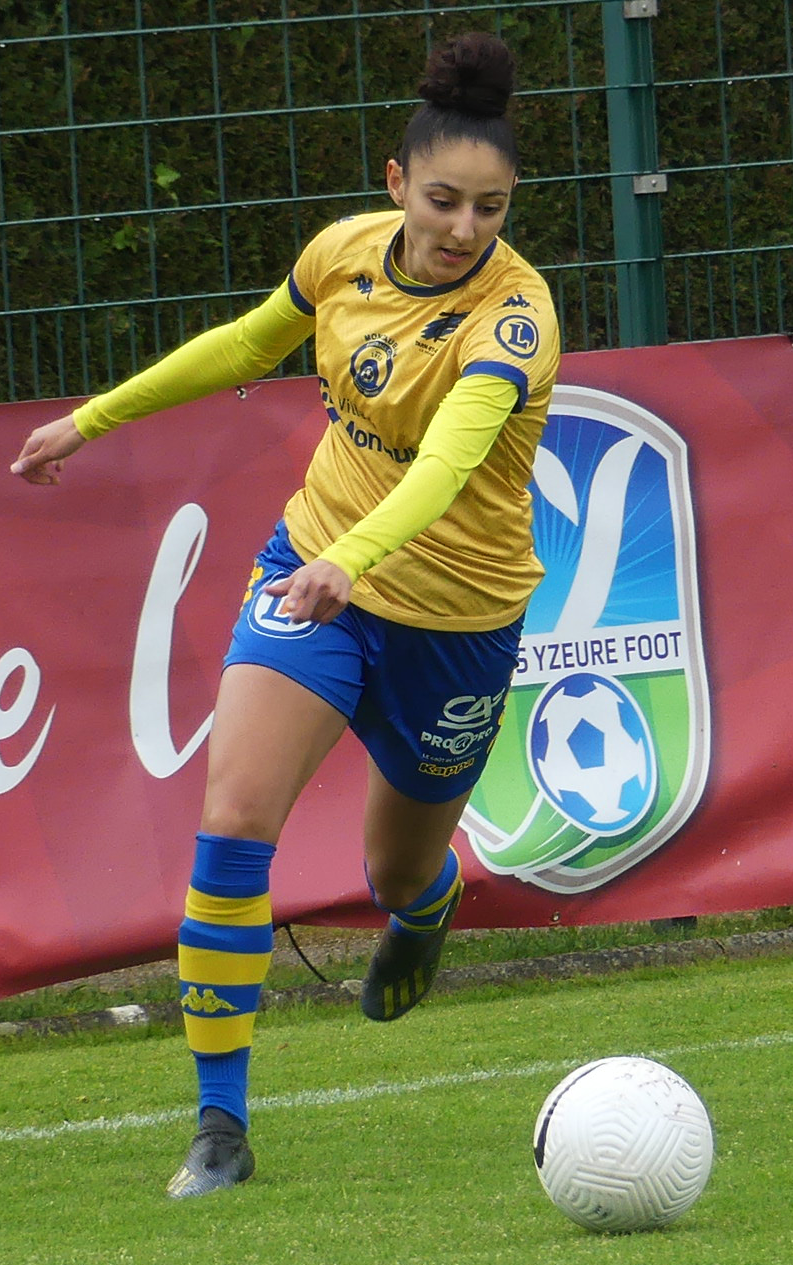
- Fikri with Montauban in 2022

Personal information
- Date of birth: 2 August 1999 (age 27)
- Place of birth: Rennes, France
- Position: Midfielder

Team information
- Current team: Rodez
- Number: 7

Youth career
- 2014–2016: Guingamp

Senior career*
Years	Team	Apps	(Gls)
2017–2020	Saint-Malo	33	(2)
2020–2021	La Roche-sur-Yon	6	(0)
2021–2023	Montauban	40	(13)
2023–	Rodez	21	(1)

International career^{‡}
2021–	Morocco	3	(0)
- * Club domestic league appearances and goals as of 26 May 2024. ‡ National team caps and goals as of 30 November 2021.

Samia Fikri (Arabic: سامية فكري; born 2 August 1999) is a footballer who plays as a midfielder for Seconde Ligue club Rodez. Born in France, she represents Morocco at international level.

== Club career ==
Fikri is a product of En Avant Guingamp. She has played for US Saint-Malo, ESOF Vendée La Roche-sur-Yon and Montauban in France.

== International career ==
Fikri made her senior debut for Morocco on 30 November 2021 as a starter in a 2–0 friendly home win over Senegal.

== See also ==
- List of Morocco women's international footballers
