= Jentrix Shikangwa =

Kenyan footballer (born 2001)

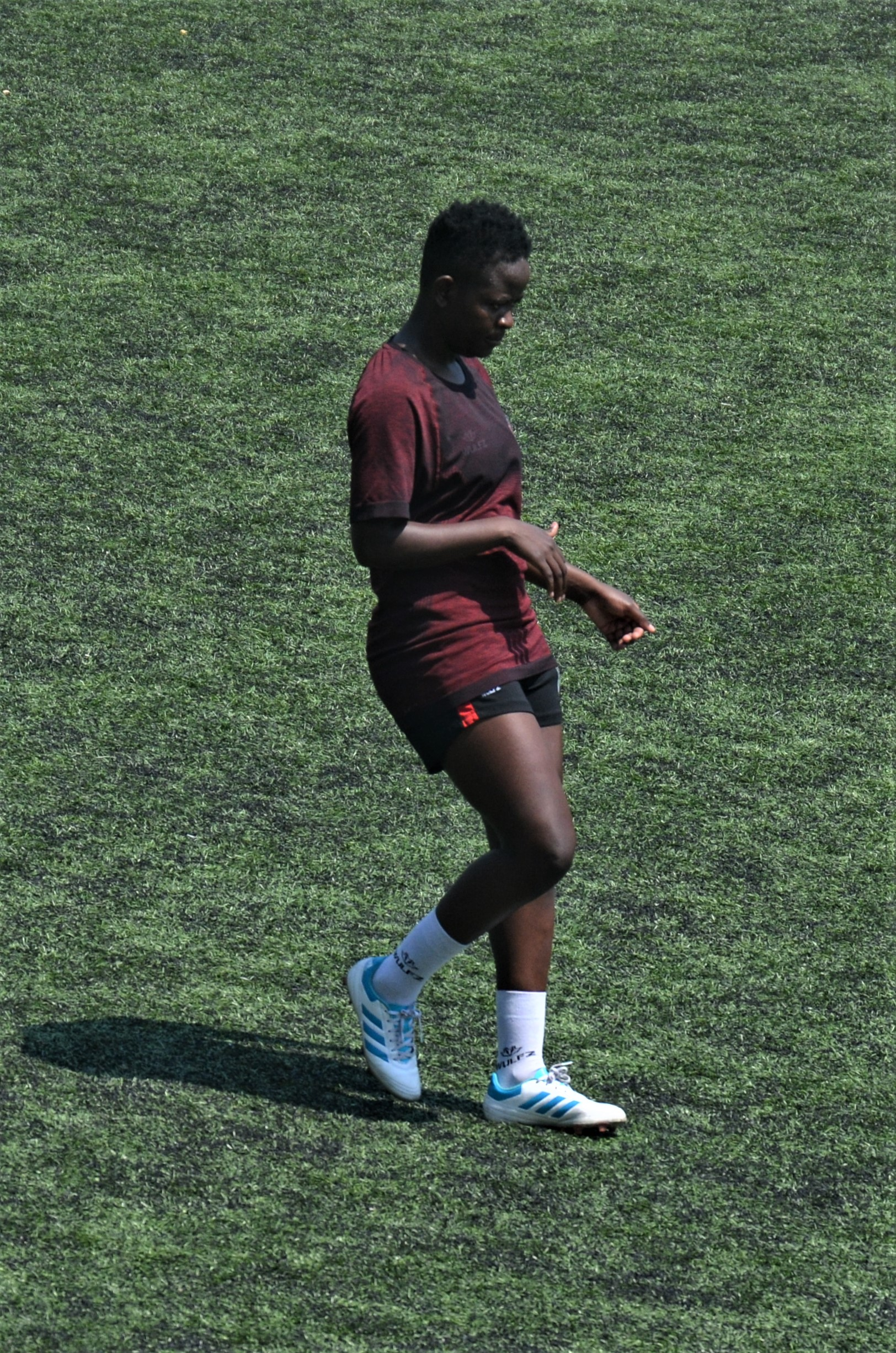
- Jentrix Shikangwa of Fatih Karagümrük )May 2022)

Personal information
- Full name: Jentrix Shikangwa Milimu
- Date of birth: 27 November 2001 (age 24)
- Place of birth: Kakamega, Kenya
- Position: Forward

Team information
- Current team: FC Masar
- Number: 10

Senior career*
Years	Team	Apps	(Gls)
- Vihiga Queens
2022–	Fatih Karagümrük	19	(6)

International career
- Kenya U20
- Kenya
- * Club domestic league appearances and goals as of 12 June 2022

Jentrix Shikangwa Milimu (born 27 November 2001), known as Jentrix Shikangwa, is a Kenyan footballer who plays as a forward for Simba Queens and the Kenya women's national team.

== Club career ==
By end January 2022, she moved to Turkey, and joined the newly established Fatih Karagümrük to play in the 2021-22 Women's Super League. She scored six goals in 19 league matches in the 2021–22 season.

== International career ==
Shikangwa capped for Kenya at senior level during the 2019 CECAFA Women's Championship and the 2020 Turkish Women's Cup.

== See also ==
- List of Kenya women's international footballers
