= Salma Bouguerch =

Moroccan footballer

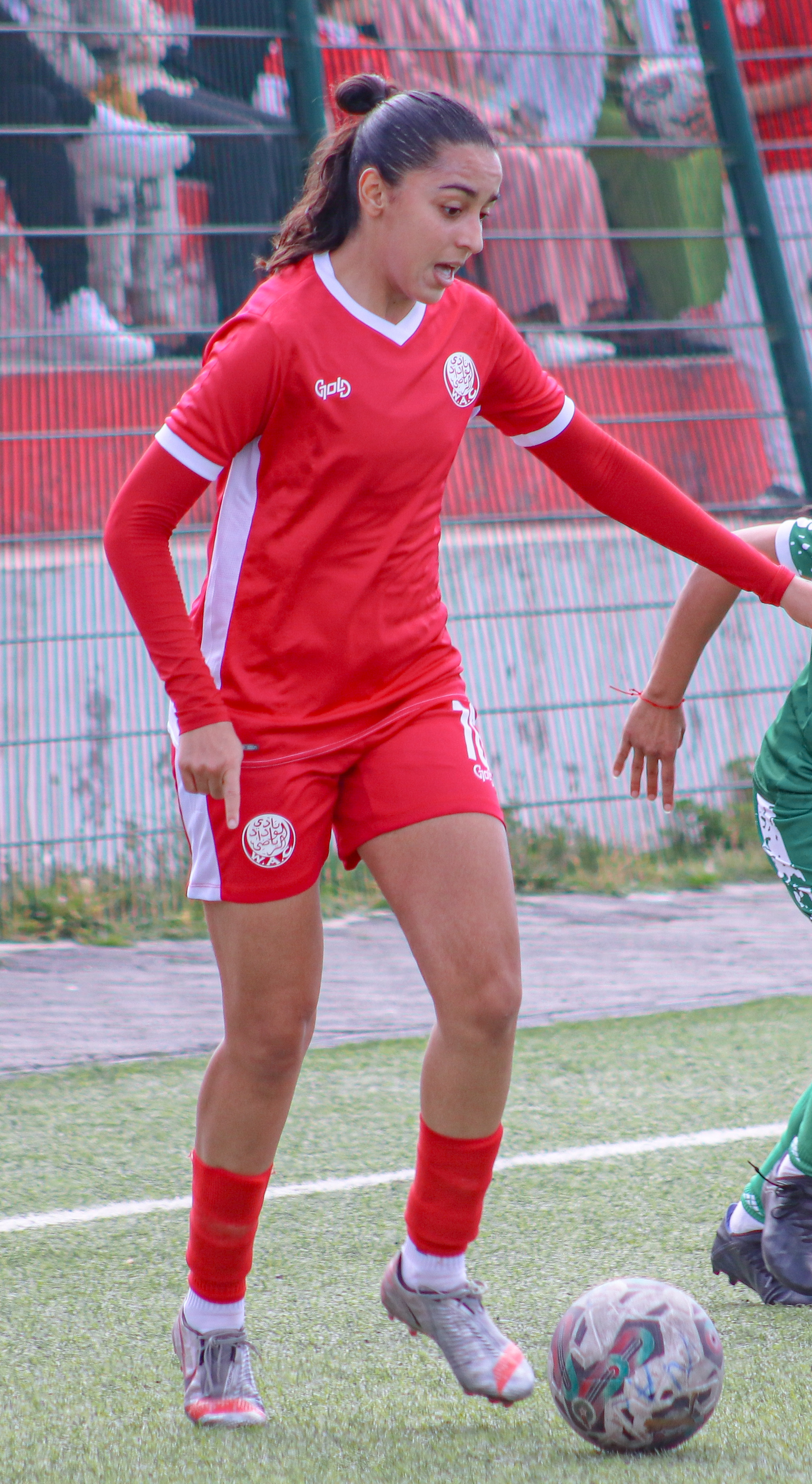
- Bouguerch playing for Wydad in 2023

Personal information
- Date of birth: 4 November 1998 (age 27)
- Place of birth: El Jadida, Morocco
- Height: 1.69 m (5 ft 7 in)
- Position: Midfielder

Team information
- Current team: Wydad
- Number: 10

Senior career*
Years	Team	Apps	(Gls)
2018–2020	El Jadida		
2020–2021	RCA Zemamra		
2021–2022	Raja Aïn Harrouda		
2022–	Wydad	76	(22)

International career^{‡}
2021	Morocco U23		
2022	Morocco Futsal	4	(1)
2024–	Morocco		
- * Club domestic league appearances and goals as of 6 July 2025 ‡ National team caps and goals as of 6 July 2025

Salma Bouguerch (Arabic: سلمى بوكرش; born 4 November 1998) is a Moroccan professional footballer who plays as a midfielder for Moroccan Women's Championship D1 club Wydad AC and the Morocco national team.

== Early and personal life ==
Bouguerch was born in El Jadida.

Outside football, she studied medicine at the Casablanca Faculty of Medicine and Pharmacy at Hassan II University of Casablanca, where she obtained her doctorate in 2024.

== Club career ==
Before moving to Wydad AC, Bouguerch played for Difâa Hassani d'El Jadida, Renaissance Zemamra and Raja Aïn Harrouda.

=== Wydad AC ===
In 2022, Bouguerch joined Wydad AC in the off-season.

== International career ==
Bouguerch was not part of Morocco's 24-player squad for the 2024 Women's Africa Cup of Nations on home soil, but was listed as a reserve player.
