= FC Masar =

Football club in Cairo, Egypt

- Full name: Football Club Masar
- Short name: FCM,
- Founded: 2019; 7 years ago as Tutankhamun FC; 25 September 2024; 2 years ago as FC Masar
- Ground: Cairo, Egypt
- Chairman: Sir Mohamed Mansour
- League: Egyptian Second Division A
- 2024–25: Promotion Group A Champions (promoted)
- Website: FC Masar

Football Club Masar (Arabic: نادي مسار لكرة القدم) is an Egyptian football club based in Cairo. The club was established in 2019 under the name Tutankhamun FC, before rebranding to its current name in 2024.

== History ==
FC Masar competed in the 2024–25 Egyptian Second Division B where they finished top of Group B, then secured promotion to the Egyptian Second Division A as top of the Promotion Group A.
