= 2020 Wake Forest Demon Deacons women's soccer team =

American college soccer season

2020 Wake Forest Demon Deacons women's soccer
- Conference: Atlantic Coast Conference
- Record: 5–7–2 (3–4–1 ACC)
- Head coach: Tony da Luz (18th season)
- Assistant coaches: Courtney Owen (4th season); Brittany Cameron (1st season)
- Home stadium: Spry Stadium

2020 ACC women's soccer standings
	Conf.						Overall
Team	W		L		T	PCT	W		L		T	PCT
No. 2 Florida State ‍†‍‡‍^{y}	8	–	0	–	0	1.000	13	–	0	–	3	.906
No. 3 North Carolina ‍†‍‍^{y}	8	–	0	–	0	1.000	18	–	2	–	0	.900
No. 4 Virginia ‍‍‍^{y}	5	–	2	–	1	.688	14	–	4	–	3	.738
No. 6 Clemson ‍‍‍^{y}	5	–	3	–	0	.625	12	–	5	–	2	.684
No. 7 Duke ‍‍‍^{y}	4	–	2	–	2	.625	12	–	5	–	4	.667
Louisville ‍‍‍	4	–	4	–	0	.500	5	–	7	–	0	.417
Virginia Tech ‍‍‍	4	–	4	–	0	.500	8	–	9	–	0	.471
Notre Dame ‍‍‍	4	–	4	–	0	.500	6	–	7	–	0	.462
Wake Forest ‍‍‍	3	–	4	–	1	.438	5	–	7	–	2	.429
Pittsburgh ‍‍‍	3	–	5	–	0	.375	11	–	5	–	0	.688
Boston College ‍‍‍	1	–	7	–	0	.125	3	–	10	–	1	.250
Syracuse ‍‍‍	1	–	7	–	0	.125	1	–	7	–	0	.125
Miami ‍‍‍	0	–	8	–	0	.000	1	–	11	–	1	.115
NC State ‍‍‍	0	–	0	–	0	–	5	–	3	–	1	.611
† – Conference champion ‡ – 2020 ACC Tournament champion y – Invited to the NCAA Tournament; As of May 18, 2021; Rankings from United Soccer Coaches Poll; Source: The ACC; Note: † Due to COVID-19, NC State suspended the 2020 women's fall soccer season. They did participate in the spring season.

The 2020 Wake Forest Demon Deacons women's soccer team represented Wake Forest University during the 2020 NCAA Division I women's soccer season. The Demon Deacons were led by head coach Tony da Luz, in his eighteenth season. They played home games at Spry Stadium. This is the team's 26th season playing organized women's college soccer, all of which have been played in the Atlantic Coast Conference.

Due to the COVID-19 pandemic, the ACC played a reduced schedule in 2020 and the NCAA Tournament was postponed to 2021. The ACC did not play a spring league schedule, but did allow teams to play non-conference games that would count toward their 2020 record in the lead up to the NCAA Tournament.

The Demon Deacons finished the fall season 3–5–1, 3–4–1 in ACC play to finish in ninth place. They did not qualify for the ACC Tournament. They finished the spring season 2–2–1 and were not invited to the NCAA Tournament.

== Previous season ==
The Demon Deacons finished the season 6–8–4 overall, and 1–6–3 in ACC play to finish in twelfth place. They did not qualify for the ACC Tournament and were not invited to the NCAA Tournament.

== Squad ==
=== Roster ===
Updated February 24, 2021

Note: Flags indicate national team as defined under FIFA eligibility rules; some limited exceptions apply. Players may hold more than one non-FIFA nationality.

No.	Pos.	Nation	Player
00	GK	USA	Madison Howard
1	GK	USA	Kaitlyn Parks
2	MF	USA	Reese Kim
3	MF	USA	Giovanna DeMarco
5	FW	USA	Ashley Frank
6	MF	USA	Madeline Allburn
7	FW	USA	Abby McNamara
8	MF	USA	Kristi Vierra
11	FW	USA	Liv Stowell
14	FW	USA	Carrie Mcintire
15	MF	USA	Faith Adams
16	GK	USA	Mia Raben

No.	Pos.	Nation	Player
17	DF	USA	Madisyn Opstal
19	MF	USA	Lyndon Wood
20	FW	JAM	Shayla Smart
21	FW	USA	Ryanne Brown
22	DF	USA	Sasha Schwartz
23	MF	USA	Lauren Tangney
25	MF	USA	Sophie Faircloth
26	DF	USA	Mia Albery
27	DF	USA	Breckyn Monteith
28	FW	USA	Sofia Rossi
30	DF	USA	Jasmin Hilliard
33	FW	USA	Hannah Betfort

=== Team management ===
Position	Staff
Head coach	Tony da Luz
Assistant Coach	Courtney Owen
Assistant Coach	Brittany Cameron

== Schedule ==
Date Time, TV	Rank^{#}	Opponent^{#}	Result	Record	Site City, State
Fall Regular season
September 10, 2020*; 7:00 p.m., ACCNX		Duke	L 3–4 ^{OT}	0–1–0	Spry Stadium (0); Winston-Salem, NC
September 17, 2020; 5:30 p.m., ACCNX		at North Carolina	L 4–1	0–2–0 (0–1–0)	Dorrance Field (0); Chapel Hill, NC
September 20, 2020; 5:00 p.m., ACCN		at Duke	T 0–0 ^{2OT}	0–2–1 (0–1–1)	Koskinen Stadium (0); Durham, NC
October 1, 2020; 7:00 p.m., ACCNX		Miami (FL)	W 1–0	1–2–1 (1–1–1)	Spry Stadium (100); Winston-Salem, NC
October 4, 2020; 1:00 p.m., ACCNX		No. 2 Florida State	L 0–4	1–3–1 (1–2–1)	Spry Stadium (100); Winston-Salem, NC
October 11, 2020; 3:30 p.m., ACCN		at No. 6 Clemson	L 0–2	1–4–1 (1–3–1)	Riggs Field (345); Clemson, SC
October 15, 2020; 7:00 p.m., ACCNX		at No. 14 Notre Dame	W 1–0	2–4–1 (2–3–1)	Alumni Stadium (128); Notre Dame, IN
October 29, 2020; 7:00 p.m., ACCRSN		Virginia Tech	L 3–4	2–5–1 (2–4–1)	Spry Stadium (100); Winston-Salem, NC
November 1, 2020; 1:00 p.m., ACCNX		Pittsburgh	W 1–0	3–5–1 (3–4–1)	Spry Stadium (100); Winston-Salem, NC
Spring Regular season
March 6, 2021*; 6:00 p.m., SECN+		at Tennessee	L 0–2	3–6–1	Regal Stadium (418); Knoxville, TN
March 20, 2021*; 1:00 p.m., ACCNX		at NC State	W 1–0 ^{2OT}	4–6–1	Dail Soccer Field (112); Raleigh, NC
March 28, 2021*; 2:00 p.m., ACCNX		Elon	W 3–0	5–6–1	Spry Stadium (222); Winston-Salem, NC
April 3, 2021*; 11:00 a.m.		at Georgia	L 1–4	5–7–1	Turner Soccer Complex (80); Athens, GA
April 8, 2021*; 1:00 p.m., ACCNX		Boston College	T 1–1 ^{2OT}	5–7–2	Spry Stadium (118); Winston-Salem, NC
April 17, 2021*; Noon		vs. Louisville	Canceled		Summers-Taylor Stadium; Johnson City, TN
*Non-conference game. ^{#}Rankings from United Soccer Coaches. (#) Tournament seedings in parentheses.

== Rankings ==
=== Fall 2020 ===
Ranking movement Legend: ██ Improvement in ranking. ██ Decrease in ranking. ██ Not ranked the previous week. RV=Others receiving votes.
Poll	Wk 1	Wk 2	Wk 3	Wk 4	Wk 5	Wk 6	Wk 7	Wk 8	Wk 9	Final
United Soccer										

=== Spring 2021 ===
Ranking movement Legend: ██ Improvement in ranking. ██ Decrease in ranking. ██ Not ranked the previous week. RV=Others receiving votes.
Poll	Pre	Wk 1	Wk 2	Wk 3	Wk 4	Wk 5	Wk 6	Wk 7	Wk 8	Wk 9	Wk 10	Wk 11	Wk 12	Wk 13	Final
United Soccer	None Released												None Released		
TopDrawer Soccer															
