= 2020 Syracuse Orange women's soccer team =

American college soccer season

2020 Syracuse Orange women's soccer
- Conference: Atlantic Coast Conference
- Record: 1–7–0 (1–7–0 ACC)
- Head coach: Nicky Adams (2nd season)
- Assistant coaches: Kelly Madsen (2nd season); Brandon Denoyer (1st season)
- Home stadium: SU Soccer Stadium

2020 ACC women's soccer standings
	Conf.						Overall
Team	W		L		T	PCT	W		L		T	PCT
No. 2 Florida State ‍†‍‡‍^{y}	8	–	0	–	0	1.000	13	–	0	–	3	.906
No. 3 North Carolina ‍†‍‍^{y}	8	–	0	–	0	1.000	18	–	2	–	0	.900
No. 4 Virginia ‍‍‍^{y}	5	–	2	–	1	.688	14	–	4	–	3	.738
No. 6 Clemson ‍‍‍^{y}	5	–	3	–	0	.625	12	–	5	–	2	.684
No. 7 Duke ‍‍‍^{y}	4	–	2	–	2	.625	12	–	5	–	4	.667
Louisville ‍‍‍	4	–	4	–	0	.500	5	–	7	–	0	.417
Virginia Tech ‍‍‍	4	–	4	–	0	.500	8	–	9	–	0	.471
Notre Dame ‍‍‍	4	–	4	–	0	.500	6	–	7	–	0	.462
Wake Forest ‍‍‍	3	–	4	–	1	.438	5	–	7	–	2	.429
Pittsburgh ‍‍‍	3	–	5	–	0	.375	11	–	5	–	0	.688
Boston College ‍‍‍	1	–	7	–	0	.125	3	–	10	–	1	.250
Syracuse ‍‍‍	1	–	7	–	0	.125	1	–	7	–	0	.125
Miami ‍‍‍	0	–	8	–	0	.000	1	–	11	–	1	.115
NC State ‍‍‍	0	–	0	–	0	–	5	–	3	–	1	.611
† – Conference champion ‡ – 2020 ACC Tournament champion y – Invited to the NCAA Tournament; As of May 18, 2021; Rankings from United Soccer Coaches Poll; Source: The ACC; Note: † Due to COVID-19, NC State suspended the 2020 women's fall soccer season. They did participate in the spring season.

The 2020 Syracuse Orange women's soccer team represented Syracuse University during the 2020 NCAA Division I women's soccer season. The Orange were led by head coach Nicky Adams, in her second season. They played home games at SU Soccer Stadium. This is the team's 24th season playing organized women's college soccer, and their 7th playing in the Atlantic Coast Conference.

Due to the COVID-19 pandemic, the ACC played a reduced schedule in 2020 and the NCAA Tournament was postponed to 2021. The ACC did not play a spring league schedule, but did allow teams to play non-conference games that would count toward their 2020 record in the lead up to the NCAA Tournament.

The Orange finished the fall season 1–7–0, 1–7–0 in ACC play to finish in a tie for eleventh place. They did not qualify for the ACC Tournament. The Orange did not participate in the spring season and were not invited to the NCAA Tournament.

== Previous season ==
The Orange finished the season 3–11–2 overall, and 1–7–1 in ACC play to finish in thirteenth place. They did not qualify for the ACC Tournament and were not invited to the NCAA Tournament.

== Squad ==
=== Roster ===
Updated March 11, 2021

Note: Flags indicate national team as defined under FIFA eligibility rules; some limited exceptions apply. Players may hold more than one non-FIFA nationality.

No.	Pos.	Nation	Player
0	GK	USA	Michaela Walsh
3	MF	USA	Margaret Thornton
5	DF	RUS	Alina Miagkova
6	MF	USA	Kailee Coonan
7	FW	USA	Blue Ellis
9	MF	USA	Olivia Erlbeck
10	FW	NZL	Hannah Pilley
11	DF	USA	Jenna Tivnan

No.	Pos.	Nation	Player
14	DF	USA	Kate Murphy
15	DF	USA	Natalie Weidenbach
18	FW	USA	Aysia Cobb
19	FW	USA	Raia James
22	GK	CAN	Lysianne Proulx
23	MF	USA	Chloe Deveze
24	FW	USA	Meghan Root

=== Team management ===
Position	Staff
Head coach	Nicky Adams
Assistant Coach	Kelly Madsen
Assistant Coach	Brandon Denoyer

== Schedule ==
Date Time, TV	Rank^{#}	Opponent^{#}	Result	Record	Site (Attendance) City, State
Non-conference regular season
September 17; 7:00 p.m., ACCNX		at Pittsburgh	L 0–2	0–1–0 (0–1–0)	Ambrose Urbanic Field (0); Pittsburgh, PA
October 1; 4:00 p.m., ACCN		at Louisville	L 0–3	0–2–0 (0–2–0)	Lynn Stadium (325); Louisville, KY
October 4 Noon, ACCNX		at Notre Dame	L 0–2	0–3–0 (0–3–0)	Alumni Stadium (0); Notre Dame, IN
October 15; 7:00 p.m., ACCNX		No. 1 North Carolina	L 0–2	0–4–0 (0–4–0)	SU Soccer Stadium (1); Syracuse, NY
October 18; 11:00 a.m., ACCRSN		No. 5 Duke	L 0–4	0–5–0 (0–5–0)	SU Soccer Stadium (1); Syracuse, NY
October 22; 7:00 p.m., ACCN		Boston College	L 1–3	0–6–0 (0–6–0)	SU Soccer Stadium (1); Syracuse, NY
October 25; 1:00 p.m., ACCNX		Pittsburgh	Canceled	0–6–0 (0–6–0)	SU Soccer Stadium; Syracuse, NY
October 29; 7:00 p.m., ACCNX		at Miami (FL)	W 1–0	1–6–0 (1–6–0)	Cobb Stadium (100); Coral Gables, FL
November 1 Noon, ACCNX		Virginia	L 3–5	1–7–0 (1–7–0)	SU Soccer Stadium (1); Syracuse, NY
*Non-conference game. ^{#}Rankings from United Soccer Coaches. (#) Tournament seedings in parentheses.

== Rankings ==
=== Fall 2020 ===
Ranking movement Legend: ██ Improvement in ranking. ██ Decrease in ranking. ██ Not ranked the previous week. RV=Others receiving votes.
Poll	Wk 1	Wk 2	Wk 3	Wk 4	Wk 5	Wk 6	Wk 7	Wk 8	Wk 9	Final
United Soccer										

=== Spring 2021 ===
Ranking movement Legend: ██ Improvement in ranking. ██ Decrease in ranking. ██ Not ranked the previous week. RV=Others receiving votes.
Poll	Pre	Wk 1	Wk 2	Wk 3	Wk 4	Wk 5	Wk 6	Wk 7	Wk 8	Wk 9	Wk 10	Wk 11	Wk 12	Wk 13	Final
United Soccer	None Released												None Released		
TopDrawer Soccer															
