= 2020 Virginia Tech Hokies women's soccer team =

American college soccer season

2020 Virginia Tech Hokies women's soccer
- Conference: Atlantic Coast Conference
- Record: 8–9–0 (4–4–0 ACC)
- Head coach: Charles Adair (10th season)
- Assistant coaches: Drew Kopp (9th season); Matt Gwilliam (6th season)
- Home stadium: Thompson Field

2020 ACC women's soccer standings
	Conf.						Overall
Team	W		L		T	PCT	W		L		T	PCT
No. 2 Florida State ‍†‍‡‍^{y}	8	–	0	–	0	1.000	13	–	0	–	3	.906
No. 3 North Carolina ‍†‍‍^{y}	8	–	0	–	0	1.000	18	–	2	–	0	.900
No. 4 Virginia ‍‍‍^{y}	5	–	2	–	1	.688	14	–	4	–	3	.738
No. 6 Clemson ‍‍‍^{y}	5	–	3	–	0	.625	12	–	5	–	2	.684
No. 7 Duke ‍‍‍^{y}	4	–	2	–	2	.625	12	–	5	–	4	.667
Louisville ‍‍‍	4	–	4	–	0	.500	5	–	7	–	0	.417
Virginia Tech ‍‍‍	4	–	4	–	0	.500	8	–	9	–	0	.471
Notre Dame ‍‍‍	4	–	4	–	0	.500	6	–	7	–	0	.462
Wake Forest ‍‍‍	3	–	4	–	1	.438	5	–	7	–	2	.429
Pittsburgh ‍‍‍	3	–	5	–	0	.375	11	–	5	–	0	.688
Boston College ‍‍‍	1	–	7	–	0	.125	3	–	10	–	1	.250
Syracuse ‍‍‍	1	–	7	–	0	.125	1	–	7	–	0	.125
Miami ‍‍‍	0	–	8	–	0	.000	1	–	11	–	1	.115
NC State ‍‍‍	0	–	0	–	0	–	5	–	3	–	1	.611
† – Conference champion ‡ – 2020 ACC Tournament champion y – Invited to the NCAA Tournament; As of May 18, 2021; Rankings from United Soccer Coaches Poll; Source: The ACC; Note: † Due to COVID-19, NC State suspended the 2020 women's fall soccer season. They did participate in the spring season.

The 2020 Virginia Tech Hokies women's soccer team represented Virginia Tech during the 2020 NCAA Division I women's soccer season. It was the 28th season of the university fielding a program and 17th competing in the Atlantic Coast Conference. The Hokies were led by 10th year head coach Charles Adair and played their home games at Thompson Field.

Due to the COVID-19 pandemic, the ACC played a reduced schedule in 2020 and the NCAA Tournament was postponed to 2021. The ACC did not play a spring league schedule, but did allow teams to play non-conference games that would count toward their 2020 record in the lead up to the NCAA Tournament.

The Hokies finished the fall season 5–8–0, 4–4–0 in ACC play to finish in a tie for sixth place. They were awarded the seventh seed in the ACC Tournament based on tiebreakers. In the tournament they lost to North Carolina in the Quarterfinals. They finished the spring season 3–1–0 and were not invited to the NCAA Tournament.

== Previous season ==
The Hokies finished the season 12–5–2, 4–4–2 in ACC play to finish in a tie for eight place. They were not invited to the ACC Tournament. They received an automatic bid to the NCAA Tournament where they lost to Xavier in the First Round.

== Squad ==
=== Roster ===
Updated: February 11, 2021

Note: Flags indicate national team as defined under FIFA eligibility rules; some limited exceptions apply. Players may hold more than one non-FIFA nationality.

No.	Pos.	Nation	Player
0	MF	(United States) USA	Kiersten Hening
1	GK	(United States) USA	Alia Skinner
2	MF	(United States) USA	Riley McCarthy
3	FW	(United States) USA	Kendal Feighan
4	MF	(United States) USA	Emily Gray
5	FW	(United States) USA	Ayden Yates
9	FW	(United States) USA	Emma Steigerwald
10	FW	(Ukraine) UKR	Nicole Kozlova
11	MF	(United States) USA	Grace Sklopan
12	FW	(United States) USA	Tori Powell
13	FW	(United States) USA	Karlie Johnson
16	MF	(United States) USA	Erin Carleton

No.	Pos.	Nation	Player
19	MF	(United States) USA	Holly Rose Webber
20	DF	(United States) USA	Victoria Haugen
21	DF	(United States) USA	Averi Visage
22	FW	(United States) USA	Taylor Bryan
23	FW	(United States) USA	Kate Bonshak
24	FW	(United States) USA	Emmalee McCarter
25	FW	(United States) USA	Calista Heister
26	FW	(United States) USA	Molly Feighan
27	DF	(United States) USA	Ava Veith
28	MF	(United States) USA	Makenzie Graham
30	GK	(United States) USA	S.A. Phillips

== Team management ==
Position	Staff
Head coach	Charles Adair
Associate Head Coach	Drew Kopp
Assistant coach	Matt Gwilliam

== Schedule ==
Date Time, TV	Rank^{#}	Opponent^{#}	Result	Record	Site (Attendance) City, State
Fall Regular season
September 12, 2020*; 6:00 p.m.		Virginia	L 1–3	0–1–0	Klöckner Stadium (243); Charlottesville, VA
September 17, 2020; 7:00 p.m.		at No. 3 Clemson	L 0–3	0–2–0 (0–1–0)	Riggs Field (227); Clemson, SC
September 20, 2020; 11:00 a.m.		at No. 1 North Carolina	L 0–1	0–3–0 (0–2–0)	Dorrance Field (0); Chapel Hill, NC
September 25*; 6:00 p.m., ACCNX		No. 11 Virginia	L 0–1 ^{OT}	0–4–0	Thompson Field (122); Blacksburg, VA
October 1; 8:00 p.m., ACCN		No. 2 Florida State	L 0–4	0–5–0 (0–3–0)	Thompson Field (124); Blacksburg, VA
October 4, 2020; 3:00 p.m.		No. 14 Pittsburgh	W 2–0	1–5–0 (1–3–0)	Thompson Field (137); Blacksburg, VA
October 9, 2020*; 7:00 p.m., ACCNX		at No. 7 Duke	L 0–2	1–6–0	Koskinen Stadium (0); Durham, NC
October 15, 2020; 7:00 p.m.		Miami (FL)	W 8–2	2–6–0 (2–3–0)	Thompson Field (150); Blacksburg, VA
October 18, 2020; 2:00 p.m., FS Go		No. 13 Louisville	L 0–1	2–7–0 (2–4–0)	Thompson Field (161); Blacksburg, VA
October 24, 2020*; 4:00 p.m.		Navy	W 2–1	3–7–0	Thompson Field (229); Blacksburg, VA
October 29, 2020; 7:00 p.m.		at Wake Forest	W 4–3	4–7–0 (3–4–0)	Spry Stadium (100); Winston-Salem, NC
November 1, 2020; 1:00 p.m.		at Boston College	W 3–0	5–7–0 (4–4–0)	Newton Campus Soccer Field (0); Chestnut Hill, MA
ACC Tournament
November 10, 2020; 5:30 p.m., ACCN	(7)	vs. (2) No. 1 North Carolina; Quarterfinals	L 0–1	5–8–0	Sahlen's Stadium (251); Cary, NC
Spring Regular season
March 7, 2021*; 5:00 p.m.		at Charlotte	W 2–1	6–8–0	Transamerica Field (299); Charlotte, NC
March 20, 2021*; 5:00 p.m.		William & Mary	W 3–0	7–8–0	Thompson Field (600); Blacksburg, VA
April 1, 2021*; 7:00 p.m.		at Liberty	W 5–3	8–8–0	Osborne Stadium (70); Lynchburg, VA
April 17, 2021*; 2:30 p.m.		vs. Auburn	L 1–4	8–9–0	Van Taylor Stadium (0); Greenwood, SC
*Non-conference game. ^{#}Rankings from United Soccer Coaches. (#) Tournament seedings in parentheses.

== Rankings ==
=== Fall 2020 ===
Ranking movement Legend: ██ Improvement in ranking. ██ Decrease in ranking. ██ Not ranked the previous week. RV=Others receiving votes.
Poll	Wk 1	Wk 2	Wk 3	Wk 4	Wk 5	Wk 6	Wk 7	Wk 8	Wk 9	Final
United Soccer										

=== Spring 2021 ===
Ranking movement Legend: ██ Improvement in ranking. ██ Decrease in ranking. ██ Not ranked the previous week. RV=Others receiving votes.
Poll	Pre	Wk 1	Wk 2	Wk 3	Wk 4	Wk 5	Wk 6	Wk 7	Wk 8	Wk 9	Wk 10	Wk 11	Wk 12	Wk 13	Final
United Soccer	None Released				RV	RV							None Released		
TopDrawer Soccer															
