= 2020 Pittsburgh Panthers women's soccer team =

American college soccer season

2020 Pittsburgh Panthers women's soccer
- Conference: Atlantic Coast Conference
- Record: 11–5–0 (3–5–0 ACC)
- Head coach: Randy Waldrum (3rd season)
- Assistant coaches: Ben Waldrum (3rd season); Dustin Stein (3rd season)
- Home stadium: Ambrose Urbanic Field

2020 ACC women's soccer standings
| | Conf. | | | | | | Overall |
| Team | W | | L | | T | PCT | W | | L | | T | PCT |
|---|---|---|---|---|---|---|---|---|---|---|---|---|
| No. 2 Florida State ‍†‍‡‍^{y} | 8 | – | 0 | – | 0 | 1.000 | 13 | – | 0 | – | 3 | .906 |
| No. 3 North Carolina ‍†‍‍^{y} | 8 | – | 0 | – | 0 | 1.000 | 18 | – | 2 | – | 0 | .900 |
| No. 4 Virginia ‍‍‍^{y} | 5 | – | 2 | – | 1 | .688 | 14 | – | 4 | – | 3 | .738 |
| No. 6 Clemson ‍‍‍^{y} | 5 | – | 3 | – | 0 | .625 | 12 | – | 5 | – | 2 | .684 |
| No. 7 Duke ‍‍‍^{y} | 4 | – | 2 | – | 2 | .625 | 12 | – | 5 | – | 4 | .667 |
| Louisville ‍‍‍ | 4 | – | 4 | – | 0 | .500 | 5 | – | 7 | – | 0 | .417 |
| Virginia Tech ‍‍‍ | 4 | – | 4 | – | 0 | .500 | 8 | – | 9 | – | 0 | .471 |
| Notre Dame ‍‍‍ | 4 | – | 4 | – | 0 | .500 | 6 | – | 7 | – | 0 | .462 |
| Wake Forest ‍‍‍ | 3 | – | 4 | – | 1 | .438 | 5 | – | 7 | – | 2 | .429 |
| Pittsburgh ‍‍‍ | 3 | – | 5 | – | 0 | .375 | 11 | – | 5 | – | 0 | .688 |
| Boston College ‍‍‍ | 1 | – | 7 | – | 0 | .125 | 3 | – | 10 | – | 1 | .250 |
| Syracuse ‍‍‍ | 1 | – | 7 | – | 0 | .125 | 1 | – | 7 | – | 0 | .125 |
| Miami ‍‍‍ | 0 | – | 8 | – | 0 | .000 | 1 | – | 11 | – | 1 | .115 |
| NC State ‍‍‍ | 0 | – | 0 | – | 0 | – | 5 | – | 3 | – | 1 | .611 |
† – Conference champion ‡ – 2020 ACC Tournament champion y – Invited to the NCAA Tournament; As of May 18, 2021; Rankings from United Soccer Coaches Poll; Source: The ACC; Note: † Due to COVID-19, NC State suspended the 2020 women's fall soccer season. They did participate in the spring season.

The 2020 Pittsburgh Panthers women's soccer team represented University of Pittsburgh during the 2020 NCAA Division I women's soccer season. The Panthers are led by head coach Randy Waldrum, in his third season. They play home games at Ambrose Urbanic Field. This is the team's 25th season playing organized men's college soccer and their 8th playing in the Atlantic Coast Conference.

Due to the COVID-19 pandemic, the ACC played a reduced schedule in 2020 and the NCAA Tournament was postponed to 2021. The ACC did not play a spring league schedule, but did allow teams to play non-conference games that would count toward their 2020 record in the lead up to the NCAA Tournament.

The Panthers finished the fall season 9–5–0, 3–5–0 in ACC play to finish in tenth place. They did not qualify for the ACC Tournament. The team won both games of their extra spring season. They were not invited to the NCAA Tournament.

== Previous season ==
The Panthers finished the season 5–10–3 overall, and 2–6–2 in ACC play to finish in tenth place. They did not qualify for the ACC Tournament and were not invited to the NCAA Tournament.

== Squad ==
=== Roster ===
Updated February 25, 2021 Note: Flags indicate national team as defined under FIFA eligibility rules; some limited exceptions apply. Players may hold more than one non-FIFA nationality.

| No. | Pos. | Nation | Player |
|---|---|---|---|
| 0 | GK | (United States) USA | Kathernie Robinson |
| 1 | GK | (United States) USA | Caitlyn Lazzarini |
| 3 | MF | (United States) USA | Mackenzie Edwards |
| 4 | MF | (United States) USA | Landy Mertz |
| 5 | DF | (United States) USA | Zaria Stevenson |
| 7 | MF | (Canada) CAN | Chantelle Parker |
| 8 | FW | (Canada) CAN | Leah Pais |
| 9 | FW | (Canada) CAN | Amanda West |
| 10 | MF | (United States) USA | Emily Yaple |
| 11 | DF | (United States) USA | Hailey Davidson |
| 12 | MF | (Canada) CAN | Anna Bout |
| 13 | DF | (United States) USA | Eva Frankovic |

| No. | Pos. | Nation | Player |
|---|---|---|---|
| 14 | FW | (United States) USA | Sarah Sinnott |
| 15 | MF | (Canada) CAN | Chloe Minas |
| 17 | DF | (Mexico) MEX | Athalie Palomo |
| 18 | MF | (United States) USA | Ione Fetsko |
| 19 | DF | (United States) USA | Kate McKay |
| 20 | MF | (United States) USA | Nyla Allen |
| 22 | MF | (United States) USA | Krystyna Rytel |
| 23 | MF | (United States) USA | Dixon Veltri |
| 27 | MF | (United States) USA | Hannah Knych |
| 28 | MF | (United States) USA | Abby Wert |
| 29 | FW | (Spain) ESP | Celia López |
| 33 | GK | (United States) USA | Gabriella Neibart |

=== Team management ===
| Position | Staff |
|---|---|
| Head coach | Randy Waldrum |
| Associate head coach | Ben Waldrum |
| Assistant coach | Dustin Stein |

== Schedule ==
| Date Time, TV | Rank^{#} | Opponent^{#} | Result | Record | Site (Attendance) City, State |
Fall Regular Season
| September 10, 2020*; 4:00 p.m. | | at Appalachian State | W 4–0 | 1–0–0 | ASU Soccer Stadium (0); Boone, NC |
| September 13, 2020*; Noon | | at Appalachian State | W 7–1 | 2–0–0 | ASU Soccer Stadium (0); Boone, NC |
| September 17, 2020; 7:00 p.m. | | Syracuse | W 2–0 | 3–0–0 (1–0–0) | Ambrose Urbanic Field (0); Pittsburgh, PA |
| September 20, 2020*; 2:05 p.m. | | at Navy | W 1–0 ^{OT} | 4–0–0 | Glenn Warner Soccer Facility (426); Annapolis, MD |
| September 24, 2020*; 4:00 p.m. | No. 12 | at The Citadel | W 2–1 ^{OT} | 5–0–0 | WLI Field (66); Charleston, SC |
| September 27, 2020*; 11:00 a.m. | No. 12 | at The Citadel | W 1–0 | 6–0–0 | WLI Field (105); Charleston, SC |
| October 1, 2020; 7:00 p.m. | No. 14 | at No. 10 Virginia | L 1–2 ^{OT} | 6–1–0 (1–1–0) | Klöckner Stadium (138); Charlottesville, VA |
| October 4, 2020; 3:00 p.m. | No. 14 | at Virginia Tech | L 0–2 | 6–2–0 (1–2–0) | Thompson Field (137); Blacksburg, VA |
| October 8, 2020; 7:00 p.m. | | Boston College | W 4–3 | 7–2–0 (2–2–0) | Ambrose Urbanic Field (0); Pittsburgh, PA |
| October 11, 2020*; 1:30 p.m. | | Navy | W 4–1 | 8–2–0 | Ambrose Urbanic Field (71); Pittsburgh, PA |
| October 15, 2020; 6:00 p.m. | | No. 2 Florida State | L 1–4 | 8–3–0 (2–3–0) | Ambrose Urbanic Field (50); Pittsburgh, PA |
| October 18, 2020; 1:00 p.m. | | Miami (FL) | W 2–0 | 9–3–0 (3–3–0) | Ambrose Urbanic Field (50); Pittsburgh, PA |
| October 25, 2020 | | at Syracuse | Canceled | 9–3–0 (3–3–0) | SU Soccer Stadium; Syracuse, NY |
| October 29, 2020; 7:00 p.m. | | at No. 3 Clemson | L 1–2 ^{OT} | 9–4–0 (3–4–0) | Riggs Field (467); Clemson, SC |
| November 1, 2020; 1:00 p.m. | | at Wake Forest | L 0–1 | 9–5–0 (3–5–0) | Spry Stadium (100); Winston-Salem, NC |
Spring Regular season
| March 7, 2021*; 7:00 p.m. | | Duquesne | W 3–0 | 10–5–0 | Ambrose Urbanic Field (200); Pittsburgh, PA |
| March 21, 2021*; 1:00 p.m. | | at Marshall | Canceled | | Veterans Memorial Soccer Complex; Huntington, WV |
| March 29, 2021*; 2:00 p.m. | | Kentucky | W 4–1 | 10–5–0 | Ambrose Urbanic Field (100); Pittsburgh, PA |
*Non-conference game. ^{#}Rankings from United Soccer Coaches. (#) Tournament seedings in parentheses.

== Rankings ==
=== Fall 2020 ===
Ranking movement Legend: ██ Improvement in ranking. ██ Decrease in ranking. ██ Not ranked the previous week. RV=Others receiving votes.
| Poll | Wk 1 | Wk 2 | Wk 3 | Wk 4 | Wk 5 | Wk 6 | Wk 7 | Wk 8 | Wk 9 | Final |
|---|---|---|---|---|---|---|---|---|---|---|
| United Soccer | 12 | 14 | | | | | | | | |

=== Spring 2021 ===
Ranking movement Legend: ██ Improvement in ranking. ██ Decrease in ranking. ██ Not ranked the previous week. RV=Others receiving votes.
| Poll | Pre | Wk 1 | Wk 2 | Wk 3 | Wk 4 | Wk 5 | Wk 6 | Wk 7 | Wk 8 | Wk 9 | Wk 10 | Wk 11 | Wk 12 | Wk 13 | Final |
|---|---|---|---|---|---|---|---|---|---|---|---|---|---|---|---|
| United Soccer | None Released | | | | | | | | | | | | None Released | | |
| TopDrawer Soccer | | | | | | | | | | | | | | | |
