= 2020 Boston College Eagles women's soccer team =

American college soccer season

2020 Boston College Eagles women's soccer
- Conference: Atlantic Coast Conference
- Record: 3–10–1 (1–7–0 ACC)
- Head coach: Jason Lowe (2nd season)
- Assistant coaches: Rachel Moreland (2nd season); Jami Kranich (2nd season)
- Home stadium: Newton Campus Soccer Field

2020 ACC women's soccer standings
| | Conf. | | | | | | Overall |
| Team | W | | L | | T | PCT | W | | L | | T | PCT |
|---|---|---|---|---|---|---|---|---|---|---|---|---|
| No. 2 Florida State ‍†‍‡‍^{y} | 8 | – | 0 | – | 0 | 1.000 | 13 | – | 0 | – | 3 | .906 |
| No. 3 North Carolina ‍†‍‍^{y} | 8 | – | 0 | – | 0 | 1.000 | 18 | – | 2 | – | 0 | .900 |
| No. 4 Virginia ‍‍‍^{y} | 5 | – | 2 | – | 1 | .688 | 14 | – | 4 | – | 3 | .738 |
| No. 6 Clemson ‍‍‍^{y} | 5 | – | 3 | – | 0 | .625 | 12 | – | 5 | – | 2 | .684 |
| No. 7 Duke ‍‍‍^{y} | 4 | – | 2 | – | 2 | .625 | 12 | – | 5 | – | 4 | .667 |
| Louisville ‍‍‍ | 4 | – | 4 | – | 0 | .500 | 5 | – | 7 | – | 0 | .417 |
| Virginia Tech ‍‍‍ | 4 | – | 4 | – | 0 | .500 | 8 | – | 9 | – | 0 | .471 |
| Notre Dame ‍‍‍ | 4 | – | 4 | – | 0 | .500 | 6 | – | 7 | – | 0 | .462 |
| Wake Forest ‍‍‍ | 3 | – | 4 | – | 1 | .438 | 5 | – | 7 | – | 2 | .429 |
| Pittsburgh ‍‍‍ | 3 | – | 5 | – | 0 | .375 | 11 | – | 5 | – | 0 | .688 |
| Boston College ‍‍‍ | 1 | – | 7 | – | 0 | .125 | 3 | – | 10 | – | 1 | .250 |
| Syracuse ‍‍‍ | 1 | – | 7 | – | 0 | .125 | 1 | – | 7 | – | 0 | .125 |
| Miami ‍‍‍ | 0 | – | 8 | – | 0 | .000 | 1 | – | 11 | – | 1 | .115 |
| NC State ‍‍‍ | 0 | – | 0 | – | 0 | – | 5 | – | 3 | – | 1 | .611 |
† – Conference champion ‡ – 2020 ACC Tournament champion y – Invited to the NCAA Tournament; As of May 18, 2021; Rankings from United Soccer Coaches Poll; Source: The ACC; Note: † Due to COVID-19, NC State suspended the 2020 women's fall soccer season. They did participate in the spring season.

The 2020 Boston College Eagles women's soccer team represented Boston College during the 2020 NCAA Division I women's soccer season. The Eagles were led by head coach Jason Lowe, who was in his second season. They played home games at Newton Campus Soccer Field. This is the team's 40th season playing organized women's college soccer, and their 16th playing in the Atlantic Coast Conference.

Due to the COVID-19 pandemic, the ACC played a reduced schedule in 2020 and the NCAA Tournament was postponed to 2021. The ACC did not play a spring league schedule, but did allow teams to play non-conference games that would count toward their 2020 record in the lead up to the NCAA Tournament.

The Eagles finished the fall season 1–7–0, 1–7–0 in ACC play to finish in a tie for eleventh place. They did not qualify for the ACC Tournament. They finished the spring season 2–3–1 and were not invited to the NCAA Tournament.

== Previous season ==
The Eagles finished the season 8–8–2 overall, and 1–8–1 in ACC play to finish in fourteenth place. They did not qualify for the ACC Tournament and were not invited to the NCAA Tournament.

== Squad ==
=== Roster ===
Updated October 8, 2020

Note: Flags indicate national team as defined under FIFA eligibility rules; some limited exceptions apply. Players may hold more than one non-FIFA nationality.

| No. | Pos. | Nation | Player |
|---|---|---|---|
| 0 | GK | GER | Wiebke Willebrandt |
| 1 | GK | USA | Allie Augur |
| 4 | FW | USA | Jenna Bike |
| 5 | MF | USA | Sonia Walk |
| 7 | FW | USA | Zoie Allen |
| 8 | MF | USA | Laura Gouvin |
| 9 | MF | USA | Sam Smith |
| 10 | FW | USA | Emily Knous |
| 11 | DF | USA | Becca McCourt |
| 12 | MF | USA | Megan Crevoiserat |
| 13 | FW | ISL | Linda Boama |
| 14 | DF | USA | Taliyah Walker |

| No. | Pos. | Nation | Player |
|---|---|---|---|
| 15 | MF | USA | Samantha Agresti |
| 17 | FW | USA | Nye Day |
| 18 | MF | USA | Rebecca Groseibl |
| 19 | DF | USA | Emma Goggins |
| 20 | MF | USA | Alison Heckman |
| 21 | MF | USA | Riley Lochhead |
| 22 | MF | USA | Jillian Jennings |
| 23 | DF | USA | Michela Agresti |
| 24 | DF | USA | Mia Karras |
| 25 | GK | USA | Mackenzie Egan |
| 27 | DF | USA | Sydney Moore |

=== Team management ===
| Position | Staff |
|---|---|
| Head Coach | Jason Lowe |
| Assistant Coach | Rachel Moreland |
| Assistant Coach | Jami Kranich |
| Volunteer Assistant Coach | Michael Galvin |

== Schedule ==
| Date Time, TV | Rank^{#} | Opponent^{#} | Result | Record | Site (Attendance) City, State |
Fall Regular season
| October 1, 2020; 6:00 p.m., ACCN | | at Notre Dame | L 0–2 | 0–1–0 (0–1–0) | Alumni Stadium (0); Notre Dame, IN |
| October 4, 2020; Noon, ACCNX | | at Louisville | L 0–2 | 0–2–0 (0–2–0) | Lynn Stadium (237); Louisville, KY |
| October 8, 2020; 6:00 p.m., ACCN | | at Pittsburgh | L 3–4 | 0–3–0 (0–3–0) | Ambrose Urbanic Field (0); Pittsburgh, PA |
| October 15, 2020; 4:00 p.m., NESN | | No. 5 Duke | L 0–1 ^{OT} | 0–4–0 (0–4–0) | Newton Campus Soccer Field (0); Chestnut Hill, MA |
| October 18, 2020; 1:00 p.m., ACCNX | | No. 1 North Carolina | L 1–3 | 0–5–0 (0–5–0) | Newton Campus Soccer Field (0); Chestnut Hill, MA |
| October 22, 2020; 7:00 p.m., ACCN | | at Syracuse | W 3–1 | 1–5–0 (1–5–0) | SU Soccer Stadium (1); Syracuse, NY |
| October 29, 2020; 6:00 p.m., ACCN | | No. 10 Virginia | L 1–2 | 1–6–0 (1–6–0) | Newton Campus Soccer Field (0); Chestnut Hill, MA |
| November 1, 2020; 1:30 p.m., ACCN | | Virginia Tech | L 0–3 | 1–7–0 (1–7–0) | Newton Campus Soccer Field (0); Chestnut Hill, MA |
Spring Regular season
| March 14, 2021*; 4:00 p.m. | | vs. Hofstra | L 1–2 ^{OT} | 1–8–0 | CFC Park (32); Bethany, CT |
| March 18, 2021*; 5:00 p.m. | | at Northeastern | Postponed | | Parsons Field; Brookline, MA |
| March 21, 2021*; 1:00 p.m. | | Rhode Island | L 2–3 ^{OT} | 1–9–0 | Newton Campus Soccer Field (0); Chestnut Hill, MA |
| March 25, 2021*; Noon | | at UAlbany | W 3–0 | 2–9–0 | Bob Ford Field (0); Albany, NY |
| April 1, 2021*; 5:00 p.m., ACCNX | | Northeastern | W 1–0 | 3–9–0 | Newton Campus Soccer Field (59); Chestnut Hill, MA |
| April 8, 2021*; 1:00 p.m., ACCNX | | at Wake Forest | T 1–1 | 3–9–1 | Spry Stadium (118); Winston-Salem, NC |
| April 17, 2021*; 1:00 p.m., ACCNX | | vs. NC State | L 1–3 | 3–10–1 | WakeMed Soccer Park (84); Cary, NC |
*Non-conference game. ^{#}Rankings from United Soccer Coaches. (#) Tournament seedings in parentheses.

== Rankings ==
=== Fall 2020 ===
Ranking movement Legend: ██ Improvement in ranking. ██ Decrease in ranking. ██ Not ranked the previous week. RV=Others receiving votes.
| Poll | Wk 1 | Wk 2 | Wk 3 | Wk 4 | Wk 5 | Wk 6 | Wk 7 | Wk 8 | Wk 9 | Final |
|---|---|---|---|---|---|---|---|---|---|---|
| United Soccer | | | | | | | | | | |

=== Spring 2021 ===
Ranking movement Legend: ██ Improvement in ranking. ██ Decrease in ranking. ██ Not ranked the previous week. RV=Others receiving votes.
| Poll | Pre | Wk 1 | Wk 2 | Wk 3 | Wk 4 | Wk 5 | Wk 6 | Wk 7 | Wk 8 | Wk 9 | Wk 10 | Wk 11 | Wk 12 | Wk 13 | Final |
|---|---|---|---|---|---|---|---|---|---|---|---|---|---|---|---|
| United Soccer | None Released | | | | | | | | | | | | None Released | | |
| TopDrawer Soccer | | | | | | | | | | | | | | | |
