= 2020 NC State Wolfpack women's soccer team =

American college soccer season

2020 NC State Wolfpack women's soccer
- Conference: Atlantic Coast Conference
- Record: 5–3–1 (0–0–0 ACC)
- Head coach: Tim Santoro (9th season)
- Assistant coaches: Glen Tourville (4th season); Steve McKenna (4th season)
- Home stadium: Dail Soccer Field

2020 ACC women's soccer standings
	Conf.						Overall
Team	W		L		T	PCT	W		L		T	PCT
No. 2 Florida State ‍†‍‡‍^{y}	8	–	0	–	0	1.000	13	–	0	–	3	.906
No. 3 North Carolina ‍†‍‍^{y}	8	–	0	–	0	1.000	18	–	2	–	0	.900
No. 4 Virginia ‍‍‍^{y}	5	–	2	–	1	.688	14	–	4	–	3	.738
No. 6 Clemson ‍‍‍^{y}	5	–	3	–	0	.625	12	–	5	–	2	.684
No. 7 Duke ‍‍‍^{y}	4	–	2	–	2	.625	12	–	5	–	4	.667
Louisville ‍‍‍	4	–	4	–	0	.500	5	–	7	–	0	.417
Virginia Tech ‍‍‍	4	–	4	–	0	.500	8	–	9	–	0	.471
Notre Dame ‍‍‍	4	–	4	–	0	.500	6	–	7	–	0	.462
Wake Forest ‍‍‍	3	–	4	–	1	.438	5	–	7	–	2	.429
Pittsburgh ‍‍‍	3	–	5	–	0	.375	11	–	5	–	0	.688
Boston College ‍‍‍	1	–	7	–	0	.125	3	–	10	–	1	.250
Syracuse ‍‍‍	1	–	7	–	0	.125	1	–	7	–	0	.125
Miami ‍‍‍	0	–	8	–	0	.000	1	–	11	–	1	.115
NC State ‍‍‍	0	–	0	–	0	–	5	–	3	–	1	.611
† – Conference champion ‡ – 2020 ACC Tournament champion y – Invited to the NCAA Tournament; As of May 18, 2021; Rankings from United Soccer Coaches Poll; Source: The ACC; Note: † Due to COVID-19, NC State suspended the 2020 women's fall soccer season. They did participate in the spring season.

The 2020 NC State Wolfpack women's soccer team represented NC State University during the 2020 NCAA Division I women's soccer season. The Wolfpack were led by head coach Tim Santoro, in his ninth season. They played home games at Dail Soccer Field. This was the team's 37th season playing organized women's college soccer and their 34th playing in the Atlantic Coast Conference.

Due to the COVID-19 pandemic, the ACC played a reduced schedule in 2020 and the NCAA Tournament was postponed to 2021. The ACC did not play a spring league schedule, but did allow teams to play non-conference games that would count toward their 2020 record in the lead up to the NCAA Tournament.

The Wolfpack did not play in the fall season. However, they did resume play for the spring non-conference season.

The Wolfpack finished the spring season 5–3–1 and did not receive an at-large invitation to the NCAA Tournament. Their non-invitation broke a four-year streak of being invited to the tournament.

== Previous season ==
The Wolfpack finished the season 12–7–4, 4–2–4 in ACC play to finish in fifth place. As the fifth seed in the ACC Tournament, they defeated Louisville in the Quarterfinals before falling to eventual champions North Carolina in the Semifinals. They received an at-large bid to the NCAA Tournament where they defeated Navy and Arkansas before losing to BYU in the Round of 16.

== Squad ==
=== Roster ===
Updated March 12, 2021 Note: Flags indicate national team as defined under FIFA eligibility rules; some limited exceptions apply. Players may hold more than one non-FIFA nationality.

No.	Pos.	Nation	Player
0	GK	USA	Eden Millan
1	GK	USA	Jessica Beriln
3	DF	USA	Brianna Weber
4	FW	USA	Leyah Hall-Robinson
5	DF	USA	Jenna Butler
6	DF	GER	Lulu Guttenberger
8	FW	USA	Denae Antoine
9	MF	CZE	Toni Starova
12	MF	USA	Jaiden Thomas
13	DF	USA	Margot Ridgeway
14	FW	USA	Mia Vaughan

No.	Pos.	Nation	Player
15	FW	USA	Jameese Joseph
17	MF	USA	Mikhail Johnson
18	DF	USA	Mackenzie Crittenberger
19	GK	ESP	Maira Echezarreta
20	DF	USA	Mia Thillet
22	MF	USA	Sandra Geiselhart
23	DF	USA	Cara Elmendorf
25	MF	USA	Sarah Arnold
27	MF	USA	Naomi Powell
28	DF	USA	Kayla Siddiqi

=== Team management ===
Position	Staff
Athletic Director	Boo Corrigan
Head coach	Tim Santoro
Associate head coach	Glen Tourville
Assistant Coach	Steve McKenna
Director of Operations	Kim Kern

== Schedule ==
Date Time, TV	Rank^{#}	Opponent^{#}	Result	Record	Site (Attendance) City, State
Spring Regular season
February 7, 2021*; 3:00 p.m., ACCNX		Old Dominion	W 2–0	1–0–0	Dail Soccer Field (56); Raleigh, NC
February 10, 2021*; 6:00 p.m., ACCNX		UNC Wilmington	W 2–1 ^{OT}	2–0–0	Dail Soccer Field (65); Raleigh, NC
February 16, 2021*; 7:00 p.m., ACCNX		Campbell	W 1–0	3–0–0	Dail Soccer Field (51); Raleigh, NC
February 24, 2021*; 7:00 p.m.		UNC Greensboro	T 0–0 ^{2OT}	3–0–1	Dail Soccer Field (0); Raleigh, NC
February 28, 2021*; 1:00 p.m., ESPN+		at VCU	W 2–1	4–0–1	Sports Backers Stadium (126); Richmond, VA
March 20, 2021*; 1:00 p.m.		Wake Forest	L 0–1 ^{2OT}	4–1–1	Dail Soccer Field (112); Raleigh, NC
April 2, 2021*; 7:00 p.m., ACCNX		No. 7 Duke	L 0–1	4–2–1	Dail Soccer Field (100); Raleigh, NC
April 11, 2021*; 2:00 p.m.		vs. Georgia	L 0–1	4–3–1	CSA OrthoCarolina Sportsplex (100); Pineville, NC
April 17, 2021*; 1:00 p.m.		vs. Boston College	W 3–1	5–3–1	WakeMed Soccer Park (84); Cary, NC
*Non-conference game. ^{#}Rankings from United Soccer Coaches. (#) Tournament seedings in parentheses.

== Rankings ==
=== Fall 2020 ===
Ranking movement Legend: ██ Improvement in ranking. ██ Decrease in ranking. ██ Not ranked the previous week. RV=Others receiving votes.
Poll	Wk 1	Wk 2	Wk 3	Wk 4	Wk 5	Wk 6	Wk 7	Wk 8	Wk 9	Final
United Soccer										

=== Spring 2021 ===
Ranking movement Legend: ██ Improvement in ranking. ██ Decrease in ranking. ██ Not ranked the previous week. RV=Others receiving votes.
Poll	Pre	Wk 1	Wk 2	Wk 3	Wk 4	Wk 5	Wk 6	Wk 7	Wk 8	Wk 9	Wk 10	Wk 11	Wk 12	Wk 13	Final
United Soccer	None Released												None Released		
TopDrawer Soccer															
