= 2020 Miami Hurricanes women's soccer team =

2020 Miami Hurricanes women's soccer
- Conference: Atlantic Coast Conference
- Record: 1–11–1 (0–8–0 ACC)
- Head coach: Sarah Barnes (3rd season)
- Assistant coaches: Alan Fread (3rd season); Jeremy Williams (3rd season)
- Home stadium: Cobb Stadium

2020 ACC women's soccer standings
	Conf.						Overall
Team	W		L		T	PCT	W		L		T	PCT
No. 2 Florida State ‍†‍‡‍^{y}	8	–	0	–	0	1.000	13	–	0	–	3	.906
No. 3 North Carolina ‍†‍‍^{y}	8	–	0	–	0	1.000	18	–	2	–	0	.900
No. 4 Virginia ‍‍‍^{y}	5	–	2	–	1	.688	14	–	4	–	3	.738
No. 6 Clemson ‍‍‍^{y}	5	–	3	–	0	.625	12	–	5	–	2	.684
No. 7 Duke ‍‍‍^{y}	4	–	2	–	2	.625	12	–	5	–	4	.667
Louisville ‍‍‍	4	–	4	–	0	.500	5	–	7	–	0	.417
Virginia Tech ‍‍‍	4	–	4	–	0	.500	8	–	9	–	0	.471
Notre Dame ‍‍‍	4	–	4	–	0	.500	6	–	7	–	0	.462
Wake Forest ‍‍‍	3	–	4	–	1	.438	5	–	7	–	2	.429
Pittsburgh ‍‍‍	3	–	5	–	0	.375	11	–	5	–	0	.688
Boston College ‍‍‍	1	–	7	–	0	.125	3	–	10	–	1	.250
Syracuse ‍‍‍	1	–	7	–	0	.125	1	–	7	–	0	.125
Miami ‍‍‍	0	–	8	–	0	.000	1	–	11	–	1	.115
NC State ‍‍‍	0	–	0	–	0	–	5	–	3	–	1	.611
† – Conference champion ‡ – 2020 ACC Tournament champion y – Invited to the NCAA Tournament; As of May 18, 2021; Rankings from United Soccer Coaches Poll; Source: The ACC; Note: † Due to COVID-19, NC State suspended the 2020 women's fall soccer season. They did participate in the spring season.

The 2020 Miami Hurricanes women's soccer team represented University of Miami during the 2020 NCAA Division I women's soccer season. The Hurricanes were led by head coach Sarah Barnes, in her third season. They played home games at Cobb Stadium. This is the team's 22nd season playing organized women's college soccer and their 17th playing in the Atlantic Coast Conference.

Due to the COVID-19 pandemic, the ACC played a reduced schedule in 2020 and the NCAA Tournament was postponed to 2021. The ACC did not play a spring league schedule, but did allow teams to play non-conference games that would count toward their 2020 record in the lead up to the NCAA Tournament.

The Hurricanes finished the fall season 0–8–0, 0–8–0 in ACC play to finish in a thirteenth place. They did not qualify for the ACC Tournament. They finished the spring season 1–2–1 and were not invited to the NCAA Tournament.

== Previous season ==
The Hurricanes finished the season 5–9–2 overall, and 2–7–1 in ACC play to finish in eleventh place. They did not qualify for the ACC Tournament and were not invited to the NCAA Tournament.

== Squad ==
=== Roster ===
Updated March 12, 2021 Note: Flags indicate national team as defined under FIFA eligibility rules; some limited exceptions apply. Players may hold more than one non-FIFA nationality.

No.	Pos.	Nation	Player
0	GK	CAN	Melissa Dagenais
1	GK	USA	Tyler Speaks
2	DF	USA	Morgan Ledenko
3	FW	USA	Mia Atrio
4	MF	SWE	Johanna Barth
6	FW	USA	Gabriela Rusek
7	FW	USA	Michelle Giamportone
8	FW	ISL	Gudrun Haralz
9	FW	BIH	Ena Taslidža
10	MF	USA	Julia Edwards
12	DF	USA	Sierra Frey
13	MF	USA	Katerina Molina

No.	Pos.	Nation	Player
14	DF	USA	Selena Fortich
15	DF	USA	Hanna Dawbarn
16	FW	USA	Jackie Koerwitz
17	MF	ISL	María Jakobsdóttir
18	MF	USA	Cailey Wesolowsky
19	DF	USA	Delaney Brown
20	MF	USA	Michaela Baker
22	FW	USA	Taylor Shell
26	MF	USA	Emma Tucker
27	GK	USA	Skylah Klein
28	MF	USA	Annie Blair
31	FW	USA	Jaclyn Marra

=== Team management ===
Position	Staff
Head coach	Sarah Barnes
Assistant Coach	Alan Fread
Assistant Coach	Jeremy Williams
Volunteer Assistant Coach	Ashleigh Shim
Director of Operations	Nicholas Petrucelli

== Schedule ==
Date Time, TV	Rank^{#}	Opponent^{#}	Result	Record	Site (Attendance) City, State
Fall Regular season
September 12, 2020*; 6:30 p.m.		vs. Clemson	L 0–4	0–1–0	Patton Park (0); Jacksonville, FL
September 17, 2020; 7:00 p.m., ACCNX		Louisville	L 0–3	0–2–0 (0–1–0)	Cobb Stadium (30); Coral Gables, FL
September 20, 2020; Noon		Notre Dame	L 6–0	0–3–0 (0–2–0)	Cobb Stadium (40); Coral Gables, FL
October 1, 2020; 7:00 p.m., ACCNX		at Wake Forest	L 0–1	0–4–0 (0–3–0)	Spry Stadium (100); Winston-Salem, NC
October 4, 2020; 3:00 p.m., ACCN		at No. 10 Virginia	L 0–3	0–5–0 (0–4–0)	Klöckner Stadium (163); Charlottesville, VA
October 15, 2020; 7:00 p.m.		at Virginia Tech	L 2–8	0–6–0 (0–5–0)	Thompson Field (150); Blacksburg, VA
October 18, 2020; 1:30 p.m.		at Pittsburgh	L 0–2	0–7–0 (0–6–0)	Ambrose Urbanic Field (50); Pittsburgh, PA
October 29, 2020; 7:00 p.m., ACCNX		Syracuse	L 0–1	0–8–0 (0–7–0)	Cobb Stadium (100); Coral Gables, FL
November 1, 2020; 3:30 p.m.		No. 5 Duke	L 1–3	0–9–0 (0–8–0)	Cobb Stadium (100); Coral Gables, FL
Spring Regular season
February 17, 2021; 7:00 p.m.		at Florida Gulf Coast	T 1–1 ^{2OT}	0–9–1	FGCU Soccer Complex (289); Fort Myers, FL
February 28, 2021; 6:00 p.m.		at Florida Atlantic	L 0–1	0–10–1	FAU Soccer Stadium (200); Boca Raton, FL
March 14, 2021; 6:00 p.m.		FIU	W 4–0	1–10–1	Cobb Stadium; Coral Gables, FL
April 3, 2021; Noon, ACCNX		Florida	L 0–2	1–11–1	Cobb Stadium (0); Coral Gables, FL
*Non-conference game. ^{#}Rankings from United Soccer Coaches. (#) Tournament seedings in parentheses.

== Rankings ==
=== Fall 2020 ===
Ranking movement Legend: ██ Improvement in ranking. ██ Decrease in ranking. ██ Not ranked the previous week. RV=Others receiving votes.
Poll	Wk 1	Wk 2	Wk 3	Wk 4	Wk 5	Wk 6	Wk 7	Wk 8	Wk 9	Final
United Soccer										

=== Spring 2021 ===
Ranking movement Legend: ██ Improvement in ranking. ██ Decrease in ranking. ██ Not ranked the previous week. RV=Others receiving votes.
Poll	Pre	Wk 1	Wk 2	Wk 3	Wk 4	Wk 5	Wk 6	Wk 7	Wk 8	Wk 9	Wk 10	Wk 11	Wk 12	Wk 13	Final
United Soccer	None Released												None Released		
TopDrawer Soccer															
