= 2020 Florida State Seminoles women's soccer team =

2020 Florida State Seminoles women's soccer

ACC Regular Season co-champions ACC Tournament Champions

NCAA Tournament, Runner-Up
- Conference: Atlantic Coast Conference
- U. Soc. Coaches poll: No. 2
- TopDrawerSoccer.com: No. 2
- Record: 13–0–3 (8–0–0 ACC)
- Head coach: Mark Krikorian (16th season)
- Assistant coaches: Mike Bristol (12th season); Morinao Imaizumi (8th season)
- Home stadium: Seminole Soccer Complex

2020 ACC women's soccer standings
	Conf.						Overall
Team	W		L		T	PCT	W		L		T	PCT
No. 2 Florida State ‍†‍‡‍^{y}	8	–	0	–	0	1.000	13	–	0	–	3	.906
No. 3 North Carolina ‍†‍‍^{y}	8	–	0	–	0	1.000	18	–	2	–	0	.900
No. 4 Virginia ‍‍‍^{y}	5	–	2	–	1	.688	14	–	4	–	3	.738
No. 6 Clemson ‍‍‍^{y}	5	–	3	–	0	.625	12	–	5	–	2	.684
No. 7 Duke ‍‍‍^{y}	4	–	2	–	2	.625	12	–	5	–	4	.667
Louisville ‍‍‍	4	–	4	–	0	.500	5	–	7	–	0	.417
Virginia Tech ‍‍‍	4	–	4	–	0	.500	8	–	9	–	0	.471
Notre Dame ‍‍‍	4	–	4	–	0	.500	6	–	7	–	0	.462
Wake Forest ‍‍‍	3	–	4	–	1	.438	5	–	7	–	2	.429
Pittsburgh ‍‍‍	3	–	5	–	0	.375	11	–	5	–	0	.688
Boston College ‍‍‍	1	–	7	–	0	.125	3	–	10	–	1	.250
Syracuse ‍‍‍	1	–	7	–	0	.125	1	–	7	–	0	.125
Miami ‍‍‍	0	–	8	–	0	.000	1	–	11	–	1	.115
NC State ‍‍‍	0	–	0	–	0	–	5	–	3	–	1	.611
† – Conference champion ‡ – 2020 ACC Tournament champion y – Invited to the NCAA Tournament; As of May 18, 2021; Rankings from United Soccer Coaches Poll; Source: The ACC; Note: † Due to COVID-19, NC State suspended the 2020 women's fall soccer season. They did participate in the spring season.

The 2020 Florida State Seminoles women's soccer team represented Florida State University during the 2020 NCAA Division I women's soccer season. It was the 26th season of the university fielding a program. The Seminoles were led by 16th year head coach Mark Krikorian.

Due to the COVID-19 pandemic, the ACC played a reduced schedule in 2020 and the NCAA Tournament was postponed to 2021.

The Seminoles finished the fall season 11–0–0, 8–0–0 in ACC play, to finish in first place. As the first seed in the ACC Tournament, they defeated Notre Dame, Duke, and finally North Carolina to claim the championship. The Seminoles did not play any additional games in the spring season and entered the NCAA Tournament as the ACC's automatic qualifier because they won the ACC Tournament. They were selected as the first overall seed in the NCAA Tournament and defeated Milwaukee in the Second Round and Penn State in the Third Round. They advanced past Duke in the Quarterfinals and Virginia in the Semifinals on penalty shootouts. However, their shootout luck ran out in the Finals, where they fell to Santa Clara to end their season. Jaelin Howell went on to win the Herman Trophy.

== Previous season ==
The Seminoles finished the season 18–6–0, 8–2–0 in ACC play, to finish in second place. As the second seed in the ACC Tournament, they defeated Clemson in the first round before losing in overtime to Virginia in the semifinals. They received an at-large bid to the NCAA Tournament where they defeated South Alabama, Brown, and USF, before losing to UCLA in the quarterfinals.

== Squad ==
=== Roster ===
Note: Flags indicate national team as defined under FIFA eligibility rules; some limited exceptions apply. Players may hold more than one non-FIFA nationality.

No.	Pos.	Nation	Player
1	GK	PUR	Cristina Roque
2	FW	USA	Jenna Nighswonger
4	MF	USA	Kristina Lynch
5	DF	SWE	Linn Bogren
6	MF	USA	Jaelin Howell
7	MF	JPN	Ran Iwai
8	FW	USA	Lauren Flynn
10	FW	JAM	Jody Brown
11	MF	USA	Kirsten Pavlisko
12	MF	IRL	Heather Payne
13	FW	BER	LeiLanni Nesbeth

No.	Pos.	Nation	Player
15	MF	USA	Kaitlyn Zipay
16	DF	CAN	Gabby Carle
17	DF	USA	Malia Berkely
20	FW	USA	Kristen McFarland
21	MF	CHN	Yujie Zhao
22	DF	USA	Alyssa Conarton
24	FW	USA	Makala Thomas
25	MF	USA	Emily Madril
26	DF	USA	Clara Robbins
45	GK	USA	Brooke Bollinger

=== Team management ===
Position	Staff
Athletic Director	David Coburn
Head coach	Mark Krikorian
Assistant Coach	Mike Bristol
Assistant Coach	Morinao Imaizumi
Director of Operations	Nathan Minion

== Schedule ==
Date Time, TV	Rank^{#}	Opponent^{#}	Result	Record	Site (Attendance) City, State
ACC Regular season
September 17; 8:00 p.m., ACCN	No. 2	Notre Dame	W 5–0	1–0–0 (1–0–0)	Seminole Soccer Complex (298); Tallahassee, FL
September 20; 1:00 p.m., ACCN	No. 2	Louisville	W 1–0	2–0–0 (2–0–0)	Seminole Soccer Complex (331); Tallahassee, FL
October 1; 8:00 p.m., ACCN	No. 2	at Virginia Tech	W 4–0	3–0–0 (3–0–0)	Thompson Field (124); Blacksburg, VA
October 4; 1:00 p.m., ACCNX	No. 2	at Wake Forest	W 4–0	4–0–0 (4–0–0)	Spry Stadium (100); Winston-Salem, NC
October 15; 6:00 p.m., ACCN	No. 2	at Pittsburgh	W 4–1	5–0–0 (5–0–0)	Ambrose Urbanic Field (50); Pittsburgh, PA
October 18; 3:30 p.m., ESPN2	No. 2	at No. 11 Virginia	W 4–3	6–0–0 (6–0–0)	Klöckner Stadium (188); Charlottesville, VA
October 29; 4:00 p.m., ACCRSN	No. 2	No. 5 Duke	W 1–0	7–0–0 (7–0–0)	Seminole Soccer Complex (284); Tallahassee, FL
November 1; 3:00 p.m., ACCRSN	No. 2	No. 3 Clemson	W 2–0	8–0–0 (8–0–0)	Seminole Soccer Complex (400); Tallahassee, FL
ACC Tournament
November 10; 12:30 p.m., ACCN	(1) No. 2	vs. (8) No. 12 Notre Dame; Quarterfinals	W 2–0	9–0–0	Sahlen's Stadium (217); Cary, NC
November 13; 5:30 p.m., ACCN	(1) No. 2	vs. (5) No. 6 Duke; Semifinals	W 4–0	10–0–0	Sahlen's Stadium (277); Cary, NC
November 15; Noon, ESPNU	(1) No. 2	vs. (2) No. 1 North Carolina; Finals	W 3–2	11–0–0	Sahlen's Stadium (320); Cary, NC
NCAA Tournament
May 1, 2021; 3:00 p.m.	(1) No. 1	vs. Milwaukee; Second Round	W 3–0	12–0–0	WakeMed Soccer Park (144); Cary, NC
May 5, 2021; 3:00 p.m., NCAA Livestream	(1) No. 1	vs. No. 9 Penn State; Third Round	W 3–1	13–0–0	WakeMed Soccer Park (185); Cary, NC
May 9, 2021; 1:00 p.m., NCAA Livestream	(1) No. 1	vs. (9) No. 8 Duke; Quarterfinals	T 0–0 (5–3 PKs) ^{2OT}	13–0–1	WakeMed Soccer Park (164); Cary, NC
May 13, 2021; 6:00 p.m., ESPN2	(1) No. 1	vs. No. 13 Virginia; Semifinals	T 0–0 (3–0 PKs) ^{2OT}	13–0–2	WakeMed Soccer Park (2,166); Cary, NC
May 17, 2021; 5:30 p.m., ESPN2	(1) No. 1	vs. (11) No. 10 Santa Clara; Finals	T 1–1 (1–4 PKs) ^{2OT}	13–0–3	WakeMed Soccer Park (5,000); Cary, NC
*Non-conference game. ^{#}Rankings from United Soccer Coaches. (#) Tournament seedings in parentheses.

== Rankings ==
=== Fall 2020 ===
Ranking movement Legend: ██ Improvement in ranking. ██ Decrease in ranking. ██ Not ranked the previous week. RV=Others receiving votes.
Poll	Wk 1	Wk 2	Wk 3	Wk 4	Wk 5	Wk 6	Wk 7	Wk 8	Wk 9	Final
United Soccer	2	2	2	2	2	2	2	2	1	1

=== Spring 2021 ===
Ranking movement Legend: ██ Improvement in ranking. ██ Decrease in ranking. ██ Not ranked the previous week. RV=Others receiving votes.
Poll	Pre	Wk 1	Wk 2	Wk 3	Wk 4	Wk 5	Wk 6	Wk 7	Wk 8	Wk 9	Wk 10	Wk 11	Wk 12	Wk 13	Final
United Soccer	None Released				1 (28)	1 (31)	1 (33)	1 (30)	1 (31)	1 (33)	1 (32)	1 (28)	None Released		2 (1)
TopDrawer Soccer	1	1	1	1	1	1	1	1	1	1	1	1	1	1	2
