= 2020 Notre Dame Fighting Irish women's soccer team =

American college soccer season

2020 Notre Dame Fighting Irish women's soccer
- Conference: Atlantic Coast Conference
- Record: 6–7–0 (4–4–0 ACC)
- Head coach: Nate Norman (3rd season)
- Assistant coaches: Dawn Siergiej (18th season); Lauren Sinacola (2nd season)
- Home stadium: Alumni Stadium

2020 ACC women's soccer standings
	Conf.						Overall
Team	W		L		T	PCT	W		L		T	PCT
No. 2 Florida State ‍†‍‡‍^{y}	8	–	0	–	0	1.000	13	–	0	–	3	.906
No. 3 North Carolina ‍†‍‍^{y}	8	–	0	–	0	1.000	18	–	2	–	0	.900
No. 4 Virginia ‍‍‍^{y}	5	–	2	–	1	.688	14	–	4	–	3	.738
No. 6 Clemson ‍‍‍^{y}	5	–	3	–	0	.625	12	–	5	–	2	.684
No. 7 Duke ‍‍‍^{y}	4	–	2	–	2	.625	12	–	5	–	4	.667
Louisville ‍‍‍	4	–	4	–	0	.500	5	–	7	–	0	.417
Virginia Tech ‍‍‍	4	–	4	–	0	.500	8	–	9	–	0	.471
Notre Dame ‍‍‍	4	–	4	–	0	.500	6	–	7	–	0	.462
Wake Forest ‍‍‍	3	–	4	–	1	.438	5	–	7	–	2	.429
Pittsburgh ‍‍‍	3	–	5	–	0	.375	11	–	5	–	0	.688
Boston College ‍‍‍	1	–	7	–	0	.125	3	–	10	–	1	.250
Syracuse ‍‍‍	1	–	7	–	0	.125	1	–	7	–	0	.125
Miami ‍‍‍	0	–	8	–	0	.000	1	–	11	–	1	.115
NC State ‍‍‍	0	–	0	–	0	–	5	–	3	–	1	.611
† – Conference champion ‡ – 2020 ACC Tournament champion y – Invited to the NCAA Tournament; As of May 18, 2021; Rankings from United Soccer Coaches Poll; Source: The ACC; Note: † Due to COVID-19, NC State suspended the 2020 women's fall soccer season. They did participate in the spring season.

The 2020 Notre Dame Fighting Irish women's soccer team represented the University of Notre Dame during the 2020 NCAA Division I women's soccer season. It was the 33rd season of the university fielding a program. The Fighting Irish were led by 3rd year head coach Nate Norman and played their games at Alumni Stadium.

Due to the COVID-19 pandemic, the ACC played a reduced schedule in 2020 and the NCAA Tournament was postponed to 2021. The ACC did not play a spring league schedule, but did allow teams to play non-conference games that would count toward their 2020 record in the lead up to the NCAA Tournament.

The Fighting Irish finished the fall season 4–5–0, 4–4–0 in ACC play to finish in a tie for sixth place. They were awarded the eighth seed in the ACC Tournament based on tiebreakers. In the tournament they lost to Florida State in the Quarterfinals. They finished the spring season 2–2–0 and were not invited to the NCAA Tournament.

== Previous season ==
The Fighting Irish finished the season 11–8–2, 4–4–2 in ACC play to finish in a tie for eighth place. As the eight seed in the ACC Tournament, they lost to North Carolina in the Quarterfinals. They received an at-large bid to the NCAA Tournament where they defeated Saint Louis in the first round, before losing to South Carolina in the Second Round.

== Squad ==
=== Roster ===
Updated February 12, 2021

Note: Flags indicate national team as defined under FIFA eligibility rules; some limited exceptions apply. Players may hold more than one non-FIFA nationality.

No.	Pos.	Nation	Player
00	GK	USA	Jaina Eckert
0	GK	USA	Mattie Interian
1	GK	USA	Brooke Littman
2	DF	USA	Jade Gosar
3	MF	USA	Maddie Mercado
4	MF	ESA	Sammi Fisher
5	FW	USA	Ellie Ospeck
6	MF	USA	Brooke VanDyck
7	FW	JAM	Kiki Van Zanten
8	DF	USA	Bea Franklin
9	FW	USA	Olivia Wingate
10	MF	USA	Erin Hohnstein
11	MF	USA	Sophia Fisher
12	MF	USA	Camryn Dyke
13	MF	USA	Nikki Colantuono
14	FW	USA	Eva Hurm
15	FW	USA	Kati Druzina

No.	Pos.	Nation	Player
16	MF	USA	Brianna Martinez
17	FW	USA	Audrey Weiss
18	DF	USA	Chloe Boice
19	DF	USA	Jenna Winebrenner
20	FW	USA	Bailey Cartwright
21	FW	USA	Erin Ospeck
23	MF	USA	Luisa Delgado
24	FW	USA	Paige Peltier
25	DF	USA	Waniya Hudson
26	MF	USA	Kate O'Connor
27	DF	USA	Caroline Gray
28	DF	USA	Eva Wirtz
29	MF	USA	Eva Gaetino
30	MF	USA	Gabrielle Daly
31	GK	USA	Ashley Naylor
32	GK	USA	Mary Votava
33	GK	USA	Kaylin Slattery

== Team management ==
Position	Staff
Head coach	Nate Norman
Assistant Coach	Dawn Siergiej
Assistant Coach	Lauren Sinacola
Operations Specialist	Jordan Andrews

== Schedule ==
Date Time, TV	Rank^{#}	Opponent^{#}	Result	Record	Site City, State
Fall Regular Season
September 17, 2020; 8:00 p.m.		at Florida State	L 0–5	0–1–0 (0–1–0)	Seminole Soccer Complex (298); Tallahassee, FL
September 20, 2020; Noon		at Miami (FL)	W 6–0	1–1–0 (1–1–0)	Cobb Stadium (40); Coral Gables, FL
October 1, 2020; 6:00 p.m.		Boston College	W 2–0	2–1–0 (2–1–0)	Alumni Stadium (0); Notre Dame, IN
October 4, 2020; Noon		Syracuse	W 2–0	3–1–0 (3–1–0)	Alumni Stadium (0); Notre Dame, IN
October 15, 2020; 7:00 p.m.	No. 14	Wake Forest	L 0–1	3–2–0 (3–2–0)	Alumni Stadium (128); Notre Dame, IN
October 18, 2020; 1:00 p.m.	No. 14	No. 4 Clemson	L 1–2	3–3–0 (3–3–0)	Alumni Stadium (98); Notre Dame, IN
October 25, 2020; 1:30 p.m.		at No. 13 Louisville	W 1–0	4–3–0 (4–3–0)	Lynn Stadium (145); Louisville, KY
November 1, 2020; 5:30 p.m.	No. 13	at No. 1 North Carolina	L 0–2	4–4–0 (4–4–0)	Dorrance Field (0); Chapel Hill, NC
ACC Tournament
November 10, 2020; 12:30 p.m.	(8) No. 12	(1) No. 2 Florida State; Quarterfinals	L 0–2	4–5–0	Sahlen's Stadium (217); Cary, NC
Exhibition
March 7, 2021; 2:00 p.m.		Chicago Red Stars	L 0–3	–	Alumni Stadium (0); Notre Dame, IN
Spring Regular Season
March 11, 2021*; 1:00 p.m.		at Cincinnati	W 2–0	5–5–0	Gettler Stadium (375); Cincinnati, OH
March 20, 2021*; 1:00 p.m.		Missouri	W 2–0	6–5–0	Alumni Stadium (123); Notre Dame, IN
March 28, 2021*; 12:30 p.m.		at Kansas	Cancelled		Rock Chalk Park; Lawrence, KS
April 3, 2021*; 2:00 p.m.		vs. Iowa State	Cancelled		NIU Field; Dekalb, IL
April 11, 2021*; 1:00 p.m., ESPN+		at No. 18 Oklahoma State	L 1–2 ^{OT}	6–5–0	Neal Patterson Stadium (416); Stillwater, OK
April 17, 2021*; 8:00 p.m.		at No. 7 TCU	L 1–2	6–7–0	Garvey-Rosenthal Stadium (636); Fort Worth, TX
*Non-conference game. ^{#}Rankings from United Soccer Coaches. (#) Tournament seedings in parentheses.

== Rankings ==
=== Fall 2020 ===
Ranking movement Legend: ██ Improvement in ranking. ██ Decrease in ranking. ██ Not ranked the previous week. RV=Others receiving votes.
Poll	Wk 1	Wk 2	Wk 3	Wk 4	Wk 5	Wk 6	Wk 7	Wk 8	Wk 9	Final
United Soccer			14	14		13	14	12	13	14

=== Spring 2021 ===
Ranking movement Legend: ██ Improvement in ranking. ██ Decrease in ranking. ██ Not ranked the previous week. RV=Others receiving votes.
Poll	Pre	Wk 1	Wk 2	Wk 3	Wk 4	Wk 5	Wk 6	Wk 7	Wk 8	Wk 9	Wk 10	Wk 11	Wk 12	Wk 13	Final
United Soccer	None Released				RV	RV							None Released		
TopDrawer Soccer															
