= 2020 Duke Blue Devils women's soccer team =

American college soccer season

2020 Duke Blue Devils women's soccer

NCAA Tournament, Quarterfinals
- Conference: Atlantic Coast Conference
- U. Soc. Coaches poll: No. 7
- TopDrawerSoccer.com: No. 6
- Record: 12–5–4 (4–2–2 ACC)
- Head coach: Robbie Church (20th season)
- Assistant coaches: Kieran Hall (2nd season); Carla Overbeck (27th season); Lane Davis (5th season)
- Home stadium: Koskinen Stadium

2020 ACC women's soccer standings
	Conf.						Overall
Team	W		L		T	PCT	W		L		T	PCT
No. 2 Florida State ‍†‍‡‍^{y}	8	–	0	–	0	1.000	13	–	0	–	3	.906
No. 3 North Carolina ‍†‍‍^{y}	8	–	0	–	0	1.000	18	–	2	–	0	.900
No. 4 Virginia ‍‍‍^{y}	5	–	2	–	1	.688	14	–	4	–	3	.738
No. 6 Clemson ‍‍‍^{y}	5	–	3	–	0	.625	12	–	5	–	2	.684
No. 7 Duke ‍‍‍^{y}	4	–	2	–	2	.625	12	–	5	–	4	.667
Louisville ‍‍‍	4	–	4	–	0	.500	5	–	7	–	0	.417
Virginia Tech ‍‍‍	4	–	4	–	0	.500	8	–	9	–	0	.471
Notre Dame ‍‍‍	4	–	4	–	0	.500	6	–	7	–	0	.462
Wake Forest ‍‍‍	3	–	4	–	1	.438	5	–	7	–	2	.429
Pittsburgh ‍‍‍	3	–	5	–	0	.375	11	–	5	–	0	.688
Boston College ‍‍‍	1	–	7	–	0	.125	3	–	10	–	1	.250
Syracuse ‍‍‍	1	–	7	–	0	.125	1	–	7	–	0	.125
Miami ‍‍‍	0	–	8	–	0	.000	1	–	11	–	1	.115
NC State ‍‍‍	0	–	0	–	0	–	5	–	3	–	1	.611
† – Conference champion ‡ – 2020 ACC Tournament champion y – Invited to the NCAA Tournament; As of May 18, 2021; Rankings from United Soccer Coaches Poll; Source: The ACC; Note: † Due to COVID-19, NC State suspended the 2020 women's fall soccer season. They did participate in the spring season.

The 2020 Duke Blue Devils women's soccer team represented Duke University during the 2020 NCAA Division I women's soccer season. The Blue Devils were led by head coach Robbie Church, in his twentieth season. They played home games at Koskinen Stadium. This was the team's 33rd season playing organized women's college soccer and their 33rd playing in the Atlantic Coast Conference.

Due to the COVID-19 pandemic, the ACC played a reduced schedule in 2020 and the NCAA Tournament was postponed to 2021. The ACC did not play a spring league schedule, but did allow teams to play non-conference games that would count toward their 2020 record in the lead up to the NCAA Tournament.

The Blue Devils finished the fall season 7–4–2, 4–2–2 in ACC play to finish in sixth place. As the fifth seed in the ACC Tournament, they defeated Clemson before losing to eventual champions Florida State in the Semifinals. The Blue Devils finished the spring season 3–1–1 and received an at-large bid to the NCAA Tournament. In the tournament, they defeated Arizona State in the Second Round and Ole Miss in the Third Round before losing to Florida State in the Quarterfinals, on penalties to end their season.

== Previous season ==
The Blue Devils finished the season 9–4–7, 3–1–6 in ACC play to finish in fifth place. As the sixth seed in the ACC Tournament, they lost to Virginia in the Quarterfinals. They received an at-large bid to the NCAA Tournament where they defeated Utah before losing to Wisconsin in the Second Round.

== Squad ==
=== Roster ===
Updated January 27, 2021

Note: Flags indicate national team as defined under FIFA eligibility rules; some limited exceptions apply. Players may hold more than one non-FIFA nationality.

No.	Pos.	Nation	Player
1	GK	USA	Brooke Heinsohn
2	DF	USA	Natalie Maurer
3	DF	USA	Taylor Mitchell
4	DF	USA	Remi Swartz
5	MF	USA	Sarah Piper
6	DF	USA	Caitlin Cosme
7	MF	USA	Sophie Jones
8	FW	USA	Tess Boade
9	FW	USA	Grace Watkins
10	FW	USA	Olivia Mijli
11	MF	USA	Julia Burnell
12	FW	USA	Marykate McGuire
13	FW	USA	Emmy Duerr
14	MF	USA	Julia Hannon

No.	Pos.	Nation	Player
15	DF	USA	Emily Royson
16	MF	USA	Sydney Simmons
17	DF	USA	Nicole Chico
18	DF	USA	Karlie Paschall
19	MF	USA	Maggie Graham
20	MF	USA	Mia Gyau
21	DF	USA	Katie Groff
22	DF	USA	Delaney Graham
23	GK	USA	Holly Stam
24	MF	USA	Mackenzie Pluck
26	GK	USA	Ruthie Jones
27	DF	USA	Natasha Turner
28	MF	USA	Lily Nabet

=== Team management ===
Position	Staff
Head coach	Robbie Church
Assistant Coach	Kieran Hall
Assistant Coach	Carla Overbeck
Assistant Coach	Lane Davis

== Schedule ==
Date Time, TV	Rank^{#}	Opponent^{#}	Result	Record	Site (Attendance) City, State
Fall Regular season
September 10, 2020*; 7:00 p.m., ACCNX		at Wake Forest	W 4–3 ^{OT}	1–0–0	Spry Stadium (0); Winston-Salem, NC
September 17, 2020; 6:00 p.m., ACCN		Virginia	T 1–1 ^{2OT}	1–0–1 (0–0–1)	Koskinen Stadium (0); Durham, NC
September 20, 2020; 5:00 p.m., ACCN		Wake Forest	T 0–0 ^{2OT}	1–0–2 (0–0–2)	Koskinen Stadium (0); Durham, NC
September 27, 2020; 3:30 p.m., ACCN	No. 7	No. 1 North Carolina	L 0–2	1–1–2 (0–1–2)	Koskinen Stadium (0); Durham, NC
October 5, 2020; 5:00 p.m., ACCN	No. 11	No. 3 Clemson	W 1–0	2–1–2 (1–1–2)	Koskinen Stadium (0); Durham, NC
October 9, 2020*; 7:00 p.m., ACCNX	No. 7	Virginia Tech	W 2–0	3–1–2	Koskinen Stadium (0); Durham, NC
October 15, 2020; 4:00 p.m., ACCRSN	No. 5	at Boston College	W 1–0 ^{OT}	4–1–2 (2–1–2)	Newton Campus Soccer Field (0); Chestnut Hill, MA
October 18, 2020; 11:00 a.m., ACCRSN	No. 5	at Syracuse	W 4–0	5–1–2 (3–1–2)	SU Soccer Stadium (1); Syracuse, NY
October 23, 2020*; 7:00 p.m., ACCNX	No. 4	at No. 1 North Carolina	L 0–1	5–2–2	Dorrance Field (0); Chapel Hill, NC
October 29, 2020; 4:00 p.m., ACCRSN	No. 5	at No. 2 Florida State	L 0–1	5–3–2 (3–2–2)	Seminole Soccer Complex (284); Tallahassee, FL
November 1, 2020; 3:30 p.m.	No. 5	at Miami (FL)	W 3–1	6–3–2 (4–2–2)	Cobb Stadium (100); Coral Gables, FL
ACC Tournament
November 10, 2020; 3:00 p.m., ACCN	(5) No. 6	vs. (4) No. 5 Clemson; Quarterfinals	W 1–0	7–3–2	Sahlen's Stadium (327); Cary, NC
November 13, 2020; 5:30 p.m., ACCN	(5) No. 6	vs. (1) No. 2 Florida State; Semifinals	L 0–4	7–4–2	Sahlen's Stadium (277); Cary, NC
Spring Regular season
March 6, 2021*; 2:00 p.m.	No. 5	at UNC Wilmington	W 3–0	8–4–2	UNC Wilmington Soccer Stadium (150); Wilmington, NC
March 17, 2021*; 6:00 p.m., ACCNX	No. 5	Coastal Carolina	W 6–0	9–4–2	Koskinen Stadium (0); Durham, NC
March 27, 2021*; 3:00 p.m.	No. 5	at No. 7 West Virginia	L 2–3	9–5–2	Dick Dlesk Soccer Stadium (400); Morgantown, WV
April 2, 2021*; 7:00 p.m., ACCNX	No. 7	at NC State	W 1–0	10–5–2	Dail Soccer Field (100); Raleigh, NC
April 11, 2021*; 1:00 p.m., ACCNX	No. 7	No. 14 Vanderbilt	T 0–0 ^{2OT}	10–5–3	Koskinen Stadium (0); Durham, NC
NCAA Tournament
May 1, 2021; Noon, ESPN3	(9) No. 8	vs. Arizona State; Second Round	W 2–1 ^{2OT}	11–5–3	Johnson Stadium (200); Greenville, NC
May 5, 2021; Noon, NCAA Livestream	(9) No. 8	vs. No. 24 Ole Miss; Third Round	W 1–0	12–5–3	WakeMed Soccer Park (185); Cary, NC
May 9, 2021; 1:00 p.m., NCAA Livestream	(9) No. 8	vs. (1) No. 1 Florida State; Quarterfinals	T 0–0 (3–5 PKs) ^{2OT}	12–5–4	WakeMed Soccer Park (164); Cary, NC
*Non-conference game. ^{#}Rankings from United Soccer Coaches. (#) Tournament seedings in parentheses.

== 2021 NWSL College Draft ==
Player	Team	Round	Pick #	Position
Tess Boade	Sky Blue FC	4	40	FW

== Rankings ==
=== Fall 2020 ===
Ranking movement Legend: ██ Improvement in ranking. ██ Decrease in ranking. ██ Not ranked the previous week. RV=Others receiving votes.
Poll	Wk 1	Wk 2	Wk 3	Wk 4	Wk 5	Wk 6	Wk 7	Wk 8	Wk 9	Final
United Soccer	7	11	7	5	4	5	6	6	5	5

=== Spring 2021 ===
Ranking movement Legend: ██ Improvement in ranking. ██ Decrease in ranking. ██ Not ranked the previous week. RV=Others receiving votes.
Poll	Pre	Wk 1	Wk 2	Wk 3	Wk 4	Wk 5	Wk 6	Wk 7	Wk 8	Wk 9	Wk 10	Wk 11	Wk 12	Wk 13	Final
United Soccer	None Released				5	5	5	5	7	7	9	8	None Released		7
TopDrawer Soccer	11	11	11	11	9	8	8	7	7	7	7	7	6	6	6
