= 2020 Clemson Tigers women's soccer team =

American college soccer season

2020 Clemson Tigers women's soccer

NCAA Tournament, Quarterfinals
- Conference: Atlantic Coast Conference
- U. Soc. Coaches poll: No. 6
- TopDrawerSoccer.com: No. 8
- Record: 12–5–2 (5–3–0 ACC)
- Head coach: Eddie Radwanski (10th season)
- Assistant coaches: Jeff Robbins (10th season); Siri Mullinix (10th season)
- Captains: Sydney Dawson; Renee Guion; Kimber Haley
- Home stadium: Riggs Field

2020 ACC women's soccer standings
	Conf.						Overall
Team	W		L		T	PCT	W		L		T	PCT
No. 2 Florida State ‍†‍‡‍^{y}	8	–	0	–	0	1.000	13	–	0	–	3	.906
No. 3 North Carolina ‍†‍‍^{y}	8	–	0	–	0	1.000	18	–	2	–	0	.900
No. 4 Virginia ‍‍‍^{y}	5	–	2	–	1	.688	14	–	4	–	3	.738
No. 6 Clemson ‍‍‍^{y}	5	–	3	–	0	.625	12	–	5	–	2	.684
No. 7 Duke ‍‍‍^{y}	4	–	2	–	2	.625	12	–	5	–	4	.667
Louisville ‍‍‍	4	–	4	–	0	.500	5	–	7	–	0	.417
Virginia Tech ‍‍‍	4	–	4	–	0	.500	8	–	9	–	0	.471
Notre Dame ‍‍‍	4	–	4	–	0	.500	6	–	7	–	0	.462
Wake Forest ‍‍‍	3	–	4	–	1	.438	5	–	7	–	2	.429
Pittsburgh ‍‍‍	3	–	5	–	0	.375	11	–	5	–	0	.688
Boston College ‍‍‍	1	–	7	–	0	.125	3	–	10	–	1	.250
Syracuse ‍‍‍	1	–	7	–	0	.125	1	–	7	–	0	.125
Miami ‍‍‍	0	–	8	–	0	.000	1	–	11	–	1	.115
NC State ‍‍‍	0	–	0	–	0	–	5	–	3	–	1	.611
† – Conference champion ‡ – 2020 ACC Tournament champion y – Invited to the NCAA Tournament; As of May 18, 2021; Rankings from United Soccer Coaches Poll; Source: The ACC; Note: † Due to COVID-19, NC State suspended the 2020 women's fall soccer season. They did participate in the spring season.

The 2020 Clemson Tigers women's soccer team represented Clemson University during the 2020 NCAA Division I women's soccer season. The Tigers were led by head coach Ed Radwanski, in his tenth season. The Tigers home games were played at Riggs Field. This was the team's 27th season playing organized soccer. All of those seasons were played in the Atlantic Coast Conference.

Due to the COVID-19 pandemic, the ACC played a reduced schedule in 2020 and the NCAA Tournament was postponed to 2021. The ACC did not play a spring league schedule, but did allow teams to play non-conference games that would count toward their 2020 record in the lead up to the NCAA Tournament.

The Tigers finished the fall season 6–4–0, 5–3–0 in ACC play to finish in fourth place. As the fourth seed in the ACC Tournament, they lost to Duke 1–0 in the Quarterfinals. The Tigers finished the spring season 6–0–0 and received an at-large bid as the fourteenth seed in the NCAA Tournament. They defeated Rutgers and UCLA on penalties before losing to Santa Clara in the Quarterfinals to end their season.

== Previous season ==
The 2019 Clemson women's soccer team finished the season with a 11–7–2 overall record and a 5–5–0 ACC record. The Tigers qualified for the ACC Tournament as the seventh-seed. The Tigers lost to Florida State in the Quarterfinals. The Tigers earned an at-large bid into the 2019 NCAA Division I Women's Soccer Tournament, for the seventh season in a row. As an unseeded team in the Florida State Bracket, Clemson defeated Vanderbilt on penalties before losing to UCLA to end their season.

== Offseason ==
=== Departures ===
Name	Number	Pos.	Height	Year	Hometown	Reason for departure
Sandy MacIver	1	GK	5'9"	Senior	Winsford, England	Graduated
Mackenzie Smith	3	MF	5'10"	Senior	Bath, NY	Graduated
Sarah Osborne	12	DF	5'5"	Senior	Chesapeake Beach, MD	Graduated
Dani Antieau	13	DF	5'10"	Senior	Pembroke Pines, FL	Graduated
Julie Mackin	16	FW	5'3"	Senior	Castle Rock, CO	Graduated
Patrice DiPasquale	30	FW	5'7"	(redshirt) Senior	Cincinnati, OH	Graduated

=== Recruiting class ===
Name	Nationality	Hometown	Club	TDS rating
Megan Bornkamp; MF	USA	Mooresville, NC	Charlotte Soccer Academy	4/5 stars
Devi Dudley; MF	USA	American Fork, UT	La Roca Premier	4/5 stars
Halle Mackiewicz; GK	USA	Broomfield, CO	Real Colorado	4/5 stars
Makenna Morris; DF	USA	Germantown, MD	Bathesda SC	4/5 stars
Madison Reid; DF	USA	Cary, NC	NC Courage	3/5 stars

== Squad ==
=== Roster ===
Updated September 11, 2020

Note: Flags indicate national team as defined under FIFA eligibility rules; some limited exceptions apply. Players may hold more than one non-FIFA nationality.

No.	Pos.	Nation	Player
1	GK	USA	Halle Mackiewicz
2	DF	USA	Makenna Morris
4	DF	USA	Harper White
5	MF	USA	Grace Wagner
6	MF	USA	Devi Dudley
7	DF	USA	Sydney Dawson
8	MF	USA	Haley Schueppert
9	MF	USA	Audrey Viso
11	MF	USA	Kimber Haley
12	DF	USA	Madi Reid
14	DF	USA	Abigail Mitchell
15	MF	USA	Hal Hershfelt
17	FW	VEN	Mariana Speckmaier

No.	Pos.	Nation	Player
19	MF	USA	Renee Guion
20	FW	USA	Courtney Jones
21	FW	USA	Maliah Morris
22	FW	USA	Lauren Burns
23	FW	USA	Caroline Conti
24	MF	USA	Megan Bornkamp
25	DF	USA	Olivia Bonacorso
26	GK	USA	Hannah McLaughlin
28	DF	USA	Abby Hanks
29	FW	USA	Sami Meredith
38	DF	USA	Jackson Moehler
51	GK	USA	Hensley Hancuff

Prior to the season, Sydney Dawson, Renee Guion, and Kimber Haley were named co-captains of the team

== Team management ==
Position	Staff
Athletic Director	(United States) Dan Radakovich
Head coach	(United States) Eddie Radwanski
Associate Head Coach	(United States) Jeff Robbins
Assistant coach	(United States) Siri Mullinix
Director of operations	(United States) Julie Carson
Assistant Athletic Trainer	(United States) Kelly Turney

== Schedule ==
Date Time, TV	Rank^{#}	Opponent^{#}	Result	Record	Site City, State
Fall Regular season
September 12, 2020*; 6:30 p.m.		vs. Miami (FL)	W 4–0	1–0–0	Patton Park (0); Jacksonville, FL
September 17, 2020; 7:00 p.m.		Virginia Tech	W 3–0	2–0–0 (1–0–0)	Riggs Field (227); Clemson, SC
September 20, 2020; 5:00 p.m.	No. 3	Virginia	W 3–0	3–0–0 (2–0–0)	Riggs Field (549); Clemson, SC
October 1, 2020; 4:00 p.m.	No. 3	at No. 1 North Carolina	L 0–2	3–1–0 (2–1–0)	Dorrance Field (0); Chapel Hill, NC
October 4, 2020; 5:00 p.m.	No. 3	at No. 11 Duke	L 0–1	3–2–0 (2–2–0)	Koskinen Stadium (0); Durham, NC
October 11, 2020; 3:30 p.m.	No. 6	Wake Forest	W 2–0	4–2–0 (3–2–0)	Riggs Field (345); Clemson, SC
October 18, 2020; 1:00 p.m.	No. 4	at No. 14 Notre Dame	W 2–1	5–2–0 (4–2–0)	Alumni Stadium (98); Notre Dame, IN
October 29, 2020; 7:00 p.m.	No. 3	Pittsburgh	W 2–1 ^{OT}	6–2–0 (5–2–0)	Riggs Field (467); Clemson, SC
November 1, 2020; 3:00 p.m.	No. 3	at No. 2 Florida State	L 0–2	6–3–0 (5–3–0)	Seminole Soccer Complex (400); Tallahassee, FL
ACC Tournament
November 10, 2020; 3:00 p.m.	(4) No. 5	vs. (5) No. 6 Duke; Quarterfinals	L 0–1	6–4–0	Sahlen's Stadium (327); Cary, NC
Spring Exhibition
February 20, 2021; 2:00 p.m.		Furman	Not Scored	–	Riggs Field; Clemson, SC
Spring Regular season
February 25, 2021*; 6:00 p.m.		at College of Charleston	W 4–1	7–4–0	Patriots Point Soccer Complex (125); Mount Pleasant, SC
February 28, 2021*; 11:00 a.m.		at College of Charleston	W 4–1	8–4–0	Patriots Point Soccer Complex (215); Mount Pleasant, SC
March 6, 2021*; 2:00 p.m.	No. 9	Auburn	W 1–0	9–4–0	Riggs Field (384); Clemson, SC
March 20, 2021*; 2:00 p.m.	No. 8	Georgia	W 3–1	10–4–0	Riggs Field (395); Clemson, SC
April 3, 2021*; 1:00 p.m.	No. 8	Alabama	W 1–0 ^{OT}	11–4–0	Riggs Field (298); Clemson, SC
April 10, 2021*; 6:00 p.m.	No. 8	at No. 11 South Carolina; Rivalry	W 2–1	12–4–0	Stone Stadium (675); Columbia, SC
NCAA Tournament
April 30, 2021; 7:00 p.m.	(14) No. 6	vs. Rutgers; Second Round	T 1–1 (5–3 PKs) ^{2OT}	12–4–1	Eakes Athletics Complex (250); Buies Creek, NC
May 5, 2021; 6:00 p.m.	(14) No. 6	vs. (3) No. 3 UCLA; Third Round	T 1–1 (6–5 PKs) ^{2OT}	12–4–2	WakeMed Soccer Park (103); Cary, NC
May 9, 2021; 5:00 p.m.	(14) No. 6	vs. (11) No. 10 Santa Clara; Quarterfinals	L 0–1	12–5–2	WakeMed Soccer Park (118); Cary, NC
*Non-conference game. ^{#}Rankings from United Soccer Coaches. (#) Tournament seedings in parentheses.

== Goals Record ==
Rank	No.	Nat.	Po.	Name	Regular season	ACC Tournament	NCAA Tournament	Total
1	24	(United States)	MF	Megan Bornkamp	8	0	0	8
2	23	(United States)	FW	Caroline Conti	7	0	0	7
3	21	(United States)	FW	Maliah Morris	5	0	1	6
4	29	(United States)	FW	Sami Meredith	2	0	1	3
5	15	(United States)	MF	Hal Hershfelt	2	0	0	2
5	17	(Venezuela)	FW	Mariana Speckmaier	2	0	0	2
5	19	(United States)	MF	Renee Guion	2	0	0	2
8	20	(United States)	FW	Courtney Jones	1	0	0	1
Total					28	0	2	30

== Disciplinary record ==
Rank	No.	Nat.	Po.	Name	Regular Season			ACC Tournament			NCAA Tournament			Total		
Rank	No.	Nat.	Po.	Name	Booked	(yellow card) (yellow-red card)	Sent off (straight red)	Booked	(yellow card) (yellow-red card)	Sent off (straight red)	Booked	(yellow card) (yellow-red card)	Sent off (straight red)	Booked	(yellow card) (yellow-red card)	Sent off (straight red)
1	24	(United States)	MF	Megan Bornkamp	4	0	0	0	0	0	1	0	0	5	0	0
2	4	(United States)	DF	Harper White	1	0	0	0	0	1	0	0	0	1	0	1
3	11	(United States)	MF	Kimber Haley	1	0	0	0	0	0	1	0	0	2	0	0
4	2	(United States)	DF	Makenna Morris	1	0	0	0	0	0	0	0	0	1	0	0
4	17	(Venezuela)	FW	Mariana Speckmaier	1	0	0	0	0	0	0	0	0	1	0	0
4	19	(United States)	MF	Renee Guion	0	0	0	0	0	0	1	0	0	1	0	0
4	20	(United States)	FW	Courtney Jones	1	0	0	0	0	0	0	0	0	1	0	0
4	21	(United States)	FW	Maliah Morris	0	0	0	0	0	0	1	0	0	1	0	0
4	38	(United States)	DF	Jackson Moehler	1	0	0	0	0	0	0	0	0	1	0	0
Total					10	0	0	0	0	1	4	0	0	14	0	1

== Awards and honors ==
Recipient	Award	Date	Ref.
Caroline Conti	ACC Offensive Player of the Week	September 22, 2020	
Hensley Hancuff	ACC Defensive Player of the Week	September 22, 2020	
Makenna Morris	All-ACC Second Team	November 13, 2020	
Mariana Speckmaier	All-ACC Second Team	November 13, 2020	
Megan Bornkamp	All-ACC Third Team	November 13, 2020	
Hal Hershfelt	All-ACC Third Team	November 13, 2020	
Courtney Jones	All-ACC Third Team	November 13, 2020	
Megan Bornkamp	All-ACC Freshman Team	November 13, 2020	
Makenna Morris	All-ACC Freshman Team	November 13, 2020	
Caroline Conti	ACC Offensive Player of the Week	March 3, 2021	
Maliah Morris	ACC Offensive Player of the Week	March 23, 2021	
Megan Bornkamp	ACC Offensive Player of the Week	April 13, 2021	

== Rankings ==
=== Fall 2020 ===
Ranking movement Legend: ██ Improvement in ranking. ██ Decrease in ranking. ██ Not ranked the previous week. RV=Others receiving votes.
Poll	Wk 1	Wk 2	Wk 3	Wk 4	Wk 5	Wk 6	Wk 7	Wk 8	Wk 9	Final
United Soccer	3	3	6	4	3	3	5	5	7	6

=== Spring 2021 ===
Ranking movement Legend: ██ Improvement in ranking. ██ Decrease in ranking. ██ Not ranked the previous week. RV=Others receiving votes.
Poll	Pre	Wk 1	Wk 2	Wk 3	Wk 4	Wk 5	Wk 6	Wk 7	Wk 8	Wk 9	Wk 10	Wk 11	Wk 12	Wk 13	Final
United Soccer	None Released				9	8	8	8	8	8	6	6	None Released		6
TopDrawer Soccer	17	17	17	16	12	11	11	11	11	11	9	9	8	8	8

== 2021 NWSL draft ==
The Tigers had one player drafted in the 2021 draft, Mariana Speckmaier, who taken as the 39th pick.

Player	Team	Round	Pick #	Position
(Venezuela) Mariana Speckmaier	Washington Spirit	4	39	FW
