= 2020 Louisville Cardinals women's soccer team =

2020 Louisville Cardinals women's soccer
- Conference: Atlantic Coast Conference
- Record: 5–7–0 (4–4–0 ACC)
- Head coach: Karen Ferguson-Dayes (21st season)
- Assistant coaches: Andy Stoots (5th season); Hunter Norton (5th season); Tim Nowak (2nd season)
- Home stadium: Lynn Stadium

2020 ACC women's soccer standings
	Conf.						Overall
Team	W		L		T	PCT	W		L		T	PCT
No. 2 Florida State ‍†‍‡‍^{y}	8	–	0	–	0	1.000	13	–	0	–	3	.906
No. 3 North Carolina ‍†‍‍^{y}	8	–	0	–	0	1.000	18	–	2	–	0	.900
No. 4 Virginia ‍‍‍^{y}	5	–	2	–	1	.688	14	–	4	–	3	.738
No. 6 Clemson ‍‍‍^{y}	5	–	3	–	0	.625	12	–	5	–	2	.684
No. 7 Duke ‍‍‍^{y}	4	–	2	–	2	.625	12	–	5	–	4	.667
Louisville ‍‍‍	4	–	4	–	0	.500	5	–	7	–	0	.417
Virginia Tech ‍‍‍	4	–	4	–	0	.500	8	–	9	–	0	.471
Notre Dame ‍‍‍	4	–	4	–	0	.500	6	–	7	–	0	.462
Wake Forest ‍‍‍	3	–	4	–	1	.438	5	–	7	–	2	.429
Pittsburgh ‍‍‍	3	–	5	–	0	.375	11	–	5	–	0	.688
Boston College ‍‍‍	1	–	7	–	0	.125	3	–	10	–	1	.250
Syracuse ‍‍‍	1	–	7	–	0	.125	1	–	7	–	0	.125
Miami ‍‍‍	0	–	8	–	0	.000	1	–	11	–	1	.115
NC State ‍‍‍	0	–	0	–	0	–	5	–	3	–	1	.611
† – Conference champion ‡ – 2020 ACC Tournament champion y – Invited to the NCAA Tournament; As of May 18, 2021; Rankings from United Soccer Coaches Poll; Source: The ACC; Note: † Due to COVID-19, NC State suspended the 2020 women's fall soccer season. They did participate in the spring season.

The 2020 Louisville Cardinals women's soccer team represented University of Louisville during the 2020 NCAA Division I women's soccer season. The Cardinals were led by head coach Karen Ferguson-Dayes, in her twenty-first season. They played home games at Lynn Stadium. This was the team's 36th season playing organized women's college soccer and their 7th playing in the Atlantic Coast Conference.

Due to the COVID-19 pandemic, the ACC played a reduced schedule in 2020 and the NCAA Tournament was postponed to 2021. The ACC did not play a spring league schedule, but did allow teams to play non-conference games that would count toward their 2020 record in the lead up to the NCAA Tournament.

The Cardinals finished the fall season 4–5–0, 4–4–0 in ACC play to finish in a tie for sixth place. They were awarded the sixth seed in the ACC Tournament based on tiebreakers. In the tournament they lost to Virginia in the Quarterfinals. The Cardinals finished the spring season 1–2–0 and were not invited to the NCAA Tournament.

== Previous season ==
The Cardinals finished the season 13–5–2, 5–3–2 in ACC play to finish in fourth place. As the fourth seed in the ACC Tournament, they lost to NC State in the Quarterfinals. They received an at-large bid to the NCAA Tournament where they defeated Lipscomb before losing to BYU in the Second Round.

== Squad ==
=== Roster ===
Updated January 28, 2021

Note: Flags indicate national team as defined under FIFA eligibility rules; some limited exceptions apply. Players may hold more than one non-FIFA nationality.

No.	Pos.	Nation	Player
0	GK	USA	Hanna Wise
1	GK	USA	Gabby Kouzelos
2	MF	USA	Sarah Hernandez
3	MF	CAN	Nadege L'Esperance
4	FW	USA	Emma Hiscock
5	FW	USA	Ravin Alexander
6	MF	USA	Riley Mullady
8	DF	USA	Caitlin Elam
9	DF	USA	Lily Yordy
10	MF	USA	Emina Ekic
11	MF	USA	Taylor Kerwin
12	FW	USA	Corinne Dente
13	FW	USA	Jessica Camken
14	FW	USA	Shay Hampton

No.	Pos.	Nation	Player
15	MF	USA	Hayley Howard
17	MF	USA	Kiana Klein
18	GK	USA	Lana Batson
19	MF	USA	Maisie Whitsett
20	FW	USA	Savina Zamborini
22	MF	USA	Jolene Ballard
23	MF	USA	Morgan Bentley
24	FW	USA	Delaney Snyder
25	FW	USA	Holly Stalls
26	FW	USA	Cassie Amshoff
27	MF	USA	Kiley Polk
30	GK	USA	Olivia Pratapas
36	DF	USA	Sydney Cradle

=== Team management ===
Position	Staff
Head coach	Karen Ferguson-Dayes
Assistant Coach	Andy Stoots
Assistant Coach	Hunter Norton
Assistant Coach	Tim Nowak
Performance Analyst	Declan Doherty
Director of Operations	Jing Hughley

== Schedule ==
Date Time, TV	Rank^{#}	Opponent^{#}	Result	Record	Site (Attendance) City, State
Fall Regular Season
September 17, 2020; 7:00 p.m., ACCNX		at Miami (FL)	W 3–0	1–0–0 (1–0–0)	Cobb Stadium (30); Coral Gables, FL
September 20, 2020; 1:00 p.m., ACCN		at Florida State	L 0–1	1–1–0 (1–1–0)	Seminole Soccer Complex (331); Tallahassee, FL
October 1, 2020; 4:00 p.m., ACCN		Syracuse	W 3–0	2–1–0 (2–1–0)	Lynn Stadium (325); Louisville, KY
October 4, 2020; Noon, ACCRSN		Boston College	W 2–0	3–1–0 (3–1–0)	Lynn Stadium (237); Louisville, KY
October 15, 2020; 8:00 p.m., ACCN	No. 13	at No. 11 Virginia	L 0–2	3–2–0 (3–2–0)	Klöckner Stadium (161); Charlottesville, VA
October 18, 2020; 2:00 p.m., Fox Sports Go	No. 13	at Virginia Tech	W 1–0	4–2–0 (4–2–0)	Thompson Field (161); Blacksburg, VA
October 25, 2020; 1:30 p.m., ACCN	No. 13	Notre Dame	L 0–1	4–3–0 (4–3–0)	Lynn Stadium (145); Louisville, KY
October 29, 2020; 8:00 p.m., ACCN		No. 1 North Carolina	L 1–3	4–4–0 (4–4–0)	Lynn Stadium (112); Louisville, KY
ACC Tournament
November 10, 2020; 8:00 p.m., ACCN	(6)	vs. (3) No. 9 Virginia; Quarterfinals	L 1–4	4–5–0	Sahlen's Stadium (217); Cary, NC
Spring Regular Season
March 6, 2021*; 2:00 p.m.		at Dayton	W 1–0	5–5–0	Baujan Field (122); Dayton, OH
March 20, 2021*; 5:00 p.m., ACCNX		Auburn	L 0–1 ^{2OT}	5–6–0	Lynn Stadium (459); Louisville, KY
March 27, 2021*; 7:00 p.m.		at Western Kentucky	L 0–1	5–7–0	WKU Soccer Complex (145); Bowling Green, KY
April 10, 2021*; 7:00 p.m., ACCNX		Tennessee	Canceled		Lynn Stadium; Louisville, KY
April 17, 2021*; Noon		vs. Wake Forest	Canceled		Summers-Taylor Stadium; Johnson City, TN
*Non-conference game. ^{#}Rankings from United Soccer Coaches. (#) Tournament seedings in parentheses.

== 2021 NWSL College Draft ==
Player	Team	Round	Pick #	Position
Emina Ekic	Racing Louisville FC	1	5	MF

== Rankings ==
=== Fall 2020 ===
Ranking movement Legend: ██ Improvement in ranking. ██ Decrease in ranking. ██ Not ranked the previous week. RV=Others receiving votes.
Poll	Wk 1	Wk 2	Wk 3	Wk 4	Wk 5	Wk 6	Wk 7	Wk 8	Wk 9	Final
United Soccer			13	13	13					

=== Spring 2021 ===
Ranking movement Legend: ██ Improvement in ranking. ██ Decrease in ranking. ██ Not ranked the previous week. RV=Others receiving votes.
Poll	Pre	Wk 1	Wk 2	Wk 3	Wk 4	Wk 5	Wk 6	Wk 7	Wk 8	Wk 9	Wk 10	Wk 11	Wk 12	Wk 13	Final
United Soccer	None Released												None Released		
TopDrawer Soccer															
