= 2020 Virginia Cavaliers women's soccer team =

American college soccer season

2020 Virginia Cavaliers women's soccer

NCAA Tournament, Semifinals
- Conference: Atlantic Coast Conference
- U. Soc. Coaches poll: No. 4
- TopDrawerSoccer.com: No. 3
- Record: 14–4–3 (5–2–1 ACC)
- Head coach: Steve Swanson (21st season)
- Assistant coaches: Ron Raab (15th season); Jaime Frias (2nd season)
- Home stadium: Klöckner Stadium

2020 ACC women's soccer standings
| | Conf. | | | | | | Overall |
| Team | W | | L | | T | PCT | W | | L | | T | PCT |
|---|---|---|---|---|---|---|---|---|---|---|---|---|
| No. 2 Florida State ‍†‍‡‍^{y} | 8 | – | 0 | – | 0 | 1.000 | 13 | – | 0 | – | 3 | .906 |
| No. 3 North Carolina ‍†‍‍^{y} | 8 | – | 0 | – | 0 | 1.000 | 18 | – | 2 | – | 0 | .900 |
| No. 4 Virginia ‍‍‍^{y} | 5 | – | 2 | – | 1 | .688 | 14 | – | 4 | – | 3 | .738 |
| No. 6 Clemson ‍‍‍^{y} | 5 | – | 3 | – | 0 | .625 | 12 | – | 5 | – | 2 | .684 |
| No. 7 Duke ‍‍‍^{y} | 4 | – | 2 | – | 2 | .625 | 12 | – | 5 | – | 4 | .667 |
| Louisville ‍‍‍ | 4 | – | 4 | – | 0 | .500 | 5 | – | 7 | – | 0 | .417 |
| Virginia Tech ‍‍‍ | 4 | – | 4 | – | 0 | .500 | 8 | – | 9 | – | 0 | .471 |
| Notre Dame ‍‍‍ | 4 | – | 4 | – | 0 | .500 | 6 | – | 7 | – | 0 | .462 |
| Wake Forest ‍‍‍ | 3 | – | 4 | – | 1 | .438 | 5 | – | 7 | – | 2 | .429 |
| Pittsburgh ‍‍‍ | 3 | – | 5 | – | 0 | .375 | 11 | – | 5 | – | 0 | .688 |
| Boston College ‍‍‍ | 1 | – | 7 | – | 0 | .125 | 3 | – | 10 | – | 1 | .250 |
| Syracuse ‍‍‍ | 1 | – | 7 | – | 0 | .125 | 1 | – | 7 | – | 0 | .125 |
| Miami ‍‍‍ | 0 | – | 8 | – | 0 | .000 | 1 | – | 11 | – | 1 | .115 |
| NC State ‍‍‍ | 0 | – | 0 | – | 0 | – | 5 | – | 3 | – | 1 | .611 |
† – Conference champion ‡ – 2020 ACC Tournament champion y – Invited to the NCAA Tournament; As of May 18, 2021; Rankings from United Soccer Coaches Poll; Source: The ACC; Note: † Due to COVID-19, NC State suspended the 2020 women's fall soccer season. They did participate in the spring season.

The 2020 Virginia Cavaliers women's soccer team represented University of Virginia during the 2020 NCAA Division I women's soccer season. The Cavaliers were led by head coach Steve Swanson, in his twentieth season. They played home games at Klöckner Stadium. This was the team's 35th season playing organized women's college soccer and their 33rd playing in the Atlantic Coast Conference.

Due to the COVID-19 pandemic, the ACC played a reduced schedule in 2020 and the NCAA Tournament was postponed to 2021.

The Cavaliers finished the fall season 8–3–1, 5–2–1 in ACC play to finish in third place. In the ACC Tournament they defeated Louisville in the Quarterfinals before losing to North Carolina in the Semifinals. The Cavaliers finished the spring season 2–1–1 and received an at-large bid to the NCAA Tournament. As an unseeded team, the Cavaliers defeated SIU Edwardsville in the First Round, BYU in the Second Round, Rice in the Third Round, and TCU in the Quarterfinals before losing to Florida State on penalties in the Semifinals.

== Squad ==
=== Roster ===
Updated November 10, 2020 Note: Flags indicate national team as defined under FIFA eligibility rules; some limited exceptions apply. Players may hold more than one non-FIFA nationality.

| No. | Pos. | Nation | Player |
|---|---|---|---|
| 0 | GK | USA | Laurel Ivory |
| 1 | GK | USA | Michaela Moran |
| 2 | MF | USA | Sydney Zandi |
| 3 | FW | USA | Ashlynn Serepca |
| 4 | FW | USA | Cam Lexow |
| 5 | DF | USA | Lizzy Sieracki |
| 6 | MF | USA | Anna Sumpter |
| 7 | FW | USA | Alexa Spaanstra |
| 8 | DF | USA | Sarah Clark |
| 9 | FW | MEX | Diana Ordóñez |
| 10 | MF | USA | Taryn Torres |
| 11 | MF | USA | Lacey McCormack |
| 12 | DF | HAI | Claire Constant |
| 13 | FW | USA | Rebecca Jarrett |
| 14 | MF | USA | Emma Dawson |
| 15 | FW | USA | Brianna Jablonowski |

| No. | Pos. | Nation | Player |
|---|---|---|---|
| 16 | DF | USA | Laney Rouse |
| 17 | FW | USA | Jansen Eichenlaub |
| 18 | FW | USA | Sarah Brunner |
| 19 | DF | USA | Samar Guidry |
| 20 | DF | USA | Talia Staude |
| 21 | MF | USA | Lauren Hinton |
| 22 | FW | USA | Lia Godfrey |
| 23 | DF | USA | McKenna Angotti |
| 24 | DF | USA | Kira Maguire |
| 25 | FW | USA | Alissa Gorzak |
| 26 | MF | USA | Laughlin Ryan |
| 27 | MF | USA | Maggie Fralin |
| 28 | MF | USA | Peyton Goldthwaite |
| 29 | GK | USA | Cayla White |
| 30 | MF | USA | Alexis Theoret |

=== Team management ===
| Position | Staff |
|---|---|
| Athletic Director | Carla Williams |
| Head Coach | Steve Swanson |
| Associate head coach | Ron Raab |
| Assistant Coach | Jamie Frias |
| Volunteer Assistant Coach | Jake Davis |
| Director of Operations | Eilidh Thomson |

== Schedule ==
| Date Time, TV | Rank^{#} | Opponent^{#} | Result | Record | Site (Attendance) City, State |
Fall Regular Season
| September 12, 2020*; 6:00 p.m. | | Virginia Tech | W 3–1 | 1–0–0 (0–0–0) | Klöckner Stadium (243); Charlottesville, VA |
| September 17, 2020; 6:00 p.m., ACCN | | at Duke | T 1–1 ^{2OT} | 1–0–1 (0–0–1) | Koskinen Stadium (0); Durham, NC |
| September 20, 2020; 3:00 p.m., ACCN | | at Clemson | L 0–3 | 1–1–1 (0–1–1) | Riggs Field (549); Clemson, SC |
| September 25, 2020*; 6:00 p.m., ACCNX | No. 11 | at Virginia Tech | W 1–0 ^{OT} | 2–1–1 (0–1–1) | Thompson Field (122); Blacksburg, VA |
| October 1, 2020; 7:00 p.m., RSN | No. 10 | No. 14 Pittsburgh | W 2–1 ^{OT} | 3–1–1 (1–1–1) | Klöckner Stadium (138); Charlottesville, VA |
| October 4, 2020; 3:00 p.m., ACCN | No. 10 | Miami | W 3–0 | 4–1–1 (2–1–1) | Klöckner Stadium (163); Charlottesville, VA |
| October 8, 2020*; 8:00 p.m., ACCN | No. 10 | at No. 1 North Carolina | Canceled | 4–1–1 (2–1–1) | Dorrance Field; Chapel Hill, NC |
| October 15, 2020; 8:00 p.m., ACCN | No. 11 | No. 13 Louisville | W 2–0 | 5–1–1 (3–1–1) | Klöckner Stadium (161); Charlottesville, VA |
| October 18, 2020; 3:30 p.m., ESPN2 | No. 11 | No. 2 Florida State | L 3–4 | 5–2–1 (3–2–1) | Klöckner Stadium (188); Charlottesville, VA |
| October 29, 2020; 6:00 p.m., ACCN | No. 10 | at Boston College | W 2–1 | 6–2–1 (4–2–1) | Newton Campus Soccer Field (0); Newton, MA |
| November 1, 2020; 12:00 p.m., RSN | No. 10 | at Syracuse | W 5–3 | 7–2–1 (5–2–1) | SU Soccer Stadium (1); Syracuse, NY |
ACC Tournament
| November 10, 2020*; 8:00 p.m., ACCN | (3) No. 9 | vs. (6) Louisville; Quarterfinals | W 4–1 | 8–2–1 (5–2–1) | Sahlen's Stadium (217); Cary, NC |
| November 13, 2020; 8:00 p.m., ACCN | (3) No. 9 | vs. (2) No. 1 North Carolina; Semifinals | L 0–2 | 8–3–1 (5–2–1) | Sahlen's Stadium (307); Cary, NC |
Spring Exhibition
| March 27, 2021*; 4:00 p.m. | | at North Carolina Courage | | – | Sahlen's Stadium; Cary, NC |
Spring Regular Season
| February 28, 2021*; 2:00 p.m., ACCNX | | George Mason | W 2–0 | 9–3–1 | Klöckner Stadium (147); Charlottesville, VA |
| March 6, 2021*; 4:00 p.m., ESPN+ | No. 8 | at VCU | W 2–1 | 10–3–1 | Sports Backers Stadium (232); Richmond, VA |
| March 14, 2021*; 5:00 p.m. | No. 9 | at Old Dominion | Canceled | | Old Dominion Soccer Complex; Norfolk, VA |
| March 18, 2021*; 7:00 p.m. | No. 9 | at James Madison | Postponed | | Sentara Park; Harrisonburg, VA |
| March 25, 2021*; 7:00 p.m. | No. 10 | at James Madison | Postponed | | Sentara Park; Harrisonburg, VA |
| April 3, 2021*; 4:00 p.m., ESPN+ | No. 10 | at No. 4 West Virginia | L 0–1 | 10–4–1 | Dick Dlesk Soccer Stadium (400); Morgantown, WV |
| April 10, 2021*; 3:00 p.m., ACCNX | No. 12 | No. 5 West Virginia | T 1–1 ^{2OT} | 10–4–2 | Klöckner Stadium (463); Charlottesville, VA |
NCAA Tournament
| April 28, 2021*; 7:00 p.m. | No. 13 | vs. SIU Edwardsville; First Round | W 3–1 | 11–4–2 | WakeMed Soccer Park (145); Cary, NC |
| May 1, 2021*; 3:00 p.m. | No. 13 | vs. (12) No. 17 BYU; Second Round | W 2–0 | 12–4–2 | WakeMed Soccer Park (150); Cary, NC |
| May 5, 2021*; 9:00 p.m., NCAA Livestream | No. 13 | vs. No. 22 Rice; Third Round | W 3–0 | 13–4–2 | WakeMed Soccer Park (167); Cary, NC |
| May 9, 2021*; 5:00 p.m., NCAA Livestream | No. 13 | vs. (4) No. 4 TCU; Quarterfinals | W 1–0 | 14–4–2 | WakeMed Soccer Park (178); Cary, NC |
| May 13, 2021*; 6:00 p.m., ESPN2 | No. 13 | vs. (1) No. 1 Florida State; Semifinals | T 0–0 (0–3 PKs) ^{2OT} | 14–4–3 | WakeMed Soccer Park (2,166); Cary, NC |
*Non-conference game. ^{#}Rankings from United Soccer Coaches. (#) Tournament seedings in parentheses.

== 2021 NWSL College Draft ==
| Player | Team | Round | Pick # | Position |
|---|---|---|---|---|
| Taryn Torres | Sky Blue FC | 3 | 23 | MF |
| Alissa Gorzak | Chicago Red Stars | 4 | 35 | FW |

== Rankings ==
=== Fall 2020 ===
Ranking movement Legend: ██ Improvement in ranking. ██ Decrease in ranking. ██ Not ranked the previous week. RV=Others receiving votes.
| Poll | Wk 1 | Wk 2 | Wk 3 | Wk 4 | Wk 5 | Wk 6 | Wk 7 | Wk 8 | Wk 9 | Final |
|---|---|---|---|---|---|---|---|---|---|---|
| United Soccer | 11 | 10 | 10 | 11 | 10 | 10 | 10 | 9 | 9 | 10 |

=== Spring 2021 ===
Ranking movement Legend: ██ Improvement in ranking. ██ Decrease in ranking. ██ Not ranked the previous week. RV=Others receiving votes.
| Poll | Pre | Wk 1 | Wk 2 | Wk 3 | Wk 4 | Wk 5 | Wk 6 | Wk 7 | Wk 8 | Wk 9 | Wk 10 | Wk 11 | Wk 12 | Wk 13 | Final |
|---|---|---|---|---|---|---|---|---|---|---|---|---|---|---|---|
| United Soccer | None Released | | | | 8 | 9 | 9 | 10 | 10 | 12 | 12 | 13 | None Released | | 4 (1) |
| TopDrawer Soccer | 6 | 6 | 6 | 6 | 5 | 5 | 5 | 5 | 3 | 6 | 5 | 5 | 4 | 3 | 3 |
