= Jasmin Hilliard =

Puerto Rican footballer (born 1998)

Personal information
- Full name: Jasmin Hilliard Fuentes
- Date of birth: September 3, 1998 (age 28)
- Place of birth: Middleburg Heights, Ohio, United States
- Height: 1.68 m (5 ft 6 in)
- Positions: Defender; forward

College career
Years	Team	Apps	(Gls)
2016–2017	Southeast Missouri State Redhawks	36	(0)
2018–2019	FIU Panthers	21	(0)
2020–2021	Wake Forest Demon Deacons	3	(0)

International career^{‡}
2018–	Puerto Rico	1+	(0)
- ‡ National team caps and goals as of May 11, 2018

Jasmin Hilliard Fuentes (born September 3, 1998) is a footballer who plays as a defender. Born in the mainland United States, she represents the Puerto Rico women's national team.

== Early life and college ==
Hilliard was raised in Medina, Ohio and attended Medina High School.

After graduating Florida International University, Hilliard played for the Wake Forest Demon Deacons while studying for a master's degree in business management.

== International career ==
Hilliard was eligible to play for Puerto Rico through her maternal grandparents. She was capped for Las Boricuas at senior level during the 2018 CONCACAF Women's Championship qualification. In October 2021, Hilliard was recalled to the squad by coach Nat Gonzalez for two friendlies against Guyana.
