= 2020 NCAA Division I women's soccer rankings =

Rankings for the 2020 NCAA Division I women's soccer season

- Season: 2020
- NCAA tournament: 2020
- Preseason No. 1: None
- NCAA Tournament Champions: Santa Clara
NCAA Division I women's soccer rankings


Three polls make up the 2020 NCAA Division I women's soccer rankings, the United Soccer Coaches Poll, the Soccer America Poll, and the Top Drawer Soccer Poll. They represent the ranking system for the 2020 NCAA Division I women's soccer season. However, due to the COVID-19 pandemic, only the United Soccer Coaches poll was released for the fall season. No preseason poll was released and a fifteen-team poll was released on September 22, 2020, as the first poll of the season.

Top Drawer Soccer released a national ranking on February 1 for the Spring Season. The ranking took into account records of teams that played in the fall.

== Legend ==
	Increase in ranking
	Decrease in ranking
	New to rankings from previous week
Italics	Number of first place votes
(#–#)	Win–loss record
т	Tied with team above or below also with this symbol

== Fall 2020 ==
=== United Soccer Coaches ===
	Week 1 Sep 22	Week 2 Sep 29	Week 3 Oct 6	Week 4 Oct 13	Week 5 Oct 20	Week 6 Oct 27	Week 7 Nov 3	Week 8 Nov 10	Week 9 Nov 17	Final Nov 24	
1.	North Carolina (2–0–0)	North Carolina (3–0–0)	North Carolina (4–0–0)	North Carolina (4–0–0)	North Carolina (6–0–0)	North Carolina (7–0–0)	North Carolina (9–0–0)	North Carolina (9–0–0)	Florida State (11–0–0)	Florida State (11–0–0)	1.
2.	Florida State (2–0–0)	Florida State (2–0–0)	Florida State (4–0–0)	Florida State (4–0–0)	Florida State (6–0–0)	Florida State (6–0–0)	Florida State (8–0–0)	Florida State (8–0–0)	North Carolina (11–1–0)	North Carolina (11–1–0)	2.
3.	Clemson (3–0–0)	Clemson (3–0–0)	Arkansas (3–0–0)	Arkansas (3–0–0)	Clemson (5–2–0)	Clemson (5–2–0)	TCU (7–0–1)	TCU (8–0–1)	TCU (8–0–1)	TCU (8–0–1)	3.
4.	West Virginia (2–0–0)	Oklahoma State (3–0–0)	Oklahoma State (3–0–1)	Clemson (4–2–0)	Duke (5–1–2)	TCU (6–0–1)	West Virginia (7–1–0)	West Virginia (7–2–0)	West Virginia (7–2–0)	West Virginia (7–2–0)	4.
5.	Texas A&M (1–0–0)	Texas A&M (1–0–0)	Kansas (3–0–0)	Duke (3–1–2)	TCU (4–0–1)	Duke (5–2–2)	Clemson (6–3–0)	Clemson (6–3–0)	Duke (7–4–2)	Duke (7–4–2)	5.
6.	Oklahoma State (2–0–0)	Kansas (2–0–0)	Clemson (3–2–0)	TCU (3–0–1)	West Virginia (5–1–0)	West Virginia (6–1–0)	Duke (6–3–2)	Duke (6–3–2)	Arkansas (7–1–0)	Clemson (6–4–0)	6.
7.	Duke (1–0–2)	West Virginia (2–1–0)	Duke (2–1–2)	West Virginia (4–1–0)	Arkansas (4–1–0)	Arkansas (5–1–0)	Arkansas (6–1–0)	Arkansas (7–1–0)	Clemson (6–4–0)	Arkansas (9–2–0)	7.
8.	Georgia (1–0–0)	Georgia (1–0–1)	Georgia (2–0–1)	Oklahoma State (3–1–1)	Kansas (4–1–0)	Texas A&M (4–1–0)	Texas A&M (5–1–0)	Texas A&M (7–1–0)	Texas A&M (7–1–0)	Vanderbilt (8–4–0)	8.
9.	Kansas (1–0–0)	Arkansas (2–0–0)	West Virginia (3–1–0)	Texas A&M (2–1–0)	Texas A&M (3–1–0)	South Carolina (5–1–0)	South Carolina (6–1–0)	Virginia (7–2–1)	Virginia (8–3–1)	Texas A&M (7–1–0)	9.
10.	Vanderbilt (1–0–0)	Virginia (2–1–1)	Virginia (4–1–1)	Kansas (3–1–0)	Virginia (5–2–1)	Virginia (5–2–1)	Virginia (7–2–1)	South Carolina (6–2–3)	South Carolina (6–2–0)	Virginia (8–3–1)	10.
11.	Virginia (1–1–1)	Duke (1–1–2)	Texas A&M (1–1–0)	Virginia (4–1–1)	South Carolina (4–1–0)	Kansas (4–2–0)	Oklahoma State (5–2–1)	Oklahoma State (5–2–1)	Oklahoma State (6–2–1)	South Carolina (7–3–0)	11.
12.	Pittsburgh (4–0–0)	TCU (1–0–1)	TCU (2–0–1)	Georgia (2–0–2)	Oklahoma State (3–2–1)	Oklahoma State (4–2–1)	Kansas (4–3–0)	Notre Dame (4–4–0)	Tennessee (4–3–1)	Oklahoma State (6–2–1)	12.
13.	Arkansas (1–0–0)	Vanderbilt (1–1–0)	Louisville (3–1–0)	Louisville (3–1–0)	Louisville (4–2–0)	Notre Dame (4–3–0)	Vanderbilt (4–3–0)	Tennessee (4–3–1)	Notre Dame (4–5–0)	Tennessee (4–4–1)	13.
14.	TCU (1–0–1)	Pittsburgh (6–0–0)	Notre Dame (3–1–0)	Notre Dame (3–1–0)	Auburn (2–0–1)	Georgia (2–2–2)	Notre Dame (4–4–0)	Ole Miss (4–4–0)	Kansas (5–3–1)	Notre Dame (4–5–0)	14.
15.	Alabama (1–0–0)	Alabama (1–0–1)	Florida (1–0–1)	South Carolina (3–1–0)	Georgia (2–1–2)	Auburn (2–0–2)	Auburn (3–1–2)	Kansas (4–3–1)	Auburn (4–3–2)	Kansas (5–3–1)	15.
	Week 1 Sep 22	Week 2 Sep 29	Week 3 Oct 6	Week 4 Oct 13	Week 5 Oct 20	Week 6 Oct 27	Week 7 Nov 3	Week 8 Nov 10	Week 9 Nov 17	Final Nov 24	
		None	Dropped: No. 13 Vanderbilt; No. 14 Pittsburgh; No. 15 Alabama	Dropped: No. 15 Florida	Dropped: No. 14 Notre Dame	Dropped: No. 13 Louisville	Dropped: No. 14 Georgia	Dropped: No. 13 Vanderbilt; No. 15 Auburn	Dropped: No. 14 Ole Miss	Dropped: No. 15 Auburn	

== Spring 2021 ==
=== United Soccer Coaches ===
	Week 1 Mar 2	Week 2 Mar 9	Week 3 Mar 16	Week 4 Mar 23	Week 5 Mar 30	Week 6 Apr 6	Week 7 Apr 13	Week 8 Apr 20	Final May 18	
1.	Florida State (28) (11–0–0)	Florida State (31) (11–0–0)	Florida State (33) (11–0–0)	Florida State (30) (11–0–0)	Florida State (31) (11–0–0)	Florida State (33) (11–0–0)	Florida State (33) (11–0–0)	Florida State (28) (11–0–0)	Santa Clara (31) (12–1–0)	1.
2.	North Carolina (1) (11–1–0)	North Carolina (2) (11–1–0)	North Carolina (11–1–0)	North Carolina (1) (12–1–0)	North Carolina (1) (12–1–0)	North Carolina (14–1–0)	North Carolina (14–1–0)	North Carolina (2) (15–1–0)	Florida State (1) (13–0–3)	2.
3.	UCLA (4) (4–0–0)	UCLA (1) (6–0–0)	UCLA (1) (8–0–0)	UCLA (1) (8–0–1)	TCU (9–0–1)	TCU (1) (9–0–1)	UCLA (12–1–1)	UCLA (3) (12–1–2)	North Carolina (1) (18–2–0)	3.
4.	TCU (1) (8–0–1)	TCU (8–0–1)	TCU (8–0–1)	TCU (2) (9–0–1)	West Virginia (2) (9–2–0)	UCLA (10–1–1)	Penn State (2) (10–1–1)	TCU (1) (11–1–1)	Virginia (1) (14–4–3)	4.
5.	Duke (7–4–2)	Duke (8–4–2)	Duke (8–4–2)	Duke (9–4–2)	UCLA (8–1–1)	West Virginia (10–2–0)	West Virginia (10–2–1)	West Virginia (10–2–1)	TCU (12–2–2)	5.
6.	Vanderbilt (9–4–0)	Vanderbilt (9–4–0)	Vanderbilt (10–4–0)	Vanderbilt (10–4–0)	Penn State (7–1–1)	Penn State (9–1–1)	Clemson (12–4–0)	Clemson (12–4–0)	Clemson (12–5–2)	6.
7.	West Virginia (7–2–0)	West Virginia (8–2–0)	West Virginia (8–2–0)	West Virginia (8–2–0)	Duke (9–5–2)	Duke (10–5–2)	TCU (10–1–1)	Arkansas (11–3–0)	Duke (12–5–4)	7.
8.	Virginia (9–3–1)	Clemson (9–4–0)	Clemson (8–4–0)	Clemson (10–4–0)	Clemson (10–4–0)	Clemson (11–4–0)	Arkansas (10–3–0)	Duke (10–5–3)	Texas A&M (12–4–1)	8.
9.	Clemson (8–4–0)	Virginia (10–3–1)	Virginia (10–3–1)	Penn State (6–1–1)	Santa Clara (5–0–0)	Arkansas (11–3–0)	Duke (10–5–3)	Penn State (10–2–1)	UCLA (13–1–3)	9.
10.	California (1–0–0)	Penn State (4–1–0)	South Carolina (8–3–0)	Virginia (10–3–1)	Virginia (10–3–1)	Georgetown (9–0–1)	Georgetown (9–0–1)	Santa Clara (7–1–0)	Georgetown (12–0–2)	10.
11.	Texas A&M (8–2–0)	South Carolina (8–3–0)	Penn State (4–0–1)	Santa Clara (3–0–0)	Arkansas (11–3–0)	South Carolina (10–3–0)	Santa Clara (7–1–0)	Texas A&M (11–3–0)	Penn State (12–3–1)	11.
12.	South Carolina (7–3–0)	Texas A&M (8–2–0)	Texas A&M (8–2–0)	Georgetown (8–0–0)	Georgetown (9–0–1)	Virginia (10–4–1)	Virginia (10–4–2)	Georgetown (11–0–1)	Arkansas (12–4–0)	12.
13.	Penn State (2–1–0)	BYU (5–2–0)	Santa Clara (3–0–0)	South Carolina (9–3–0)	South Carolina (9–3–0)	Santa Clara (6–1–0)	Texas A&M (8–4–0)	Virginia (10–4–2)	West Virginia (10–3–1)	13.
14.	BYU (2–2–0)	USC (3–1–0)	Oklahoma State (9–2–1)	Oklahoma State (10–2–1)	Memphis (7–1–0)	Vanderbilt (10–5–0)	Vanderbilt (10–5–1)	USC (7–3–3)	Oklahoma State (13–3–2)	14.
15.	Arkansas (10–3–0)	Oklahoma State (8–2–1)	Georgetown (6–0–0)	Arkansas (11–3–0)	Oklahoma State (11–2–1)	South Florida (7–0–1)	South Florida (7–0–2)	South Florida (9–0–2)	Washington (10–4–4)	15.
16.	Oklahoma State (7–2–1)	Georgetown (4–0–0)	Arizona State (6–0–2)	BYU (6–3–0)	Arizona State (7–1–2)	BYU (9–3–1)	South Carolina (10–4–0)	Vanderbilt (9–5–1)	Rice (14–3–1)	16.
17.	Saint Louis (5–0–0)	Rutgers (4–1–0)	BYU (4–2–0)	Memphis (6–1–0)	BYU (8–3–0)	Arizona State (8–2–2)	BYU (10–3–1)	BYU (11–3–1)	BYU (11–4–1)	17.
18.	Memphis (2–1–0)	Arkansas (10–3–0)	Arkansas (10–3–0)	Washington (6–1–2)	Vanderbilt (10–5–0)	Oklahoma State (11–3–1)	Oklahoma State (12–3–1)	South Carolina (10–4–0)	USC (7–3–4)	18.
19.	Rutgers (2–1–0)	Memphis (3–1–0)	Memphis (4–0–0)	Rutgers (6–1–1)	Washington (6–1–2)	Memphis (7–2–0)	USC (7–3–2)	Oklahoma State (12–3–1)	South Florida (10–1–2)	19.
20.	Oregon (2–0–1)	Saint Louis (5–1–0)	Stanford (4–2–0)	Saint Louis (8–1–0)	Saint Louis (9–1–0)	Saint Louis (11–1–0)	Saint Louis (13–1–0)	Saint Louis (15–1–0)	Saint Louis (15–1–1)	20.
21.	Georgetown (2–0–0)	Stanford (3–2–0)	Rutgers (4–1–1)	Arizona State (6–1–2)	South Florida (6–0–1)	USC (6–3–1)	Memphis (8–2–0)	Washington (9–3–3)	Vanderbilt (9–6–1)	21.
22.	Pepperdine (2–2–0)	Washington (4–0–2)	Saint Louis (6–1–0)	South Florida (5–0–1)	Texas A&M (8–3–0)	Ohio State (6–1–3)	Rutgers (8–2–3)	Rice (12–2–1)	South Carolina (11–5–0)	22.
23.	Stanford (1–2–0)	Santa Clara (2–0–0)	Washington (5–1–2)	Texas A&M (7–3–0)	Ohio State (5–1–3)	Texas A&M (8–3–0)	Hofstra (7–0–1)	Wisconsin (7–4–3)	Ole Miss (10–6–2)	23.
24.	Indiana (2–1–0)	California (3–1–0)	South Florida (4–0–1)	Pepperdine (4–2–1)	Rutgers (6–2–2)	Hofstra (6–0–1)	Washington (9–3–2)	Ole Miss (10–5–0)	Rutgers (9–3–4)	24.
25.	Washington State (4–0–1)	Pepperdine (3–2–0)	Pepperdine (3–1–0)	Ole Miss (6–5–0)	Hofstra (6–0–0)	Pepperdine (6–3–1)	Rice (10–2–0)	Memphis (8–3–0)	Arizona State (9–6–2)	25.
	Week 1 Mar 2	Week 2 Mar 9	Week 3 Mar 16	Week 4 Mar 23	Week 5 Mar 30	Week 6 Apr 6	Week 7 Apr 13	Week 8 Apr 20	Final May 18	
		Dropped: No. 20 Oregon; No. 24 Indiana; No. 25 Washington State	Dropped: No. 14 USC; No. 24 California	Dropped: No. 24 California	Dropped: No. 24 Pepperdine; No. 25 Ole Miss	Dropped: No. 19 Washington; No. 24 Rutgers	Dropped: No. 17 Arizona State; No. 22 Ohio State; No. 25 Pepperdine	Dropped: No. 22 Rutgers; No. 23 Hofstra	Dropped: No. 23 Wisconsin; No. 25 Memphis	

=== Top Drawer Soccer ===
	Preseason Feb 1	Week 1 Feb 8	Week 2 Feb 15	Week 3 Feb 22	Week 4 Mar 1	Week 5 Mar 8	Week 6 Mar 15	Week 7 Mar 22	Week 8 Mar 29	Week 9 Apr 5	Week 10 Apr 12	Week 11 Apr 19	Week 12 May 3	Week 13 May 10	Final May 18	
1.	Florida State (11–0–0)	Florida State (11–0–0)	Florida State (11–0–0)	Florida State (11–0–0)	Florida State (11–0–0)	Florida State (11–0–0)	Florida State (11–0–0)	Florida State (11–0–0)	Florida State (11–0–0)	Florida State (11–0–0)	Florida State (11–0–0)	Florida State (11–0–0)	Florida State (12–0–0)	Florida State (13–0–1)	Santa Clara (11–1–1)	1.
2.	North Carolina (11–1–0)	North Carolina (11–1–0)	North Carolina (11–1–0)	North Carolina (11–1–0)	North Carolina (11–1–0)	North Carolina (11–1–0)	North Carolina (11–1–0)	North Carolina (12–1–0)	North Carolina (13–1–0)	North Carolina (14–1–0)	North Carolina (14–1–0)	North Carolina (14–1–0)	North Carolina (15–1–0)	North Carolina (17–1–0)	Florida State (13–0–3)	2.
3.	Stanford (0–0–0)	Stanford (0–0–0)	Stanford (0–0–0)	Stanford (1–0–0)	UCLA (4–0–0)	UCLA (6–0–0)	UCLA (8–0–0)	UCLA (8–0–1)	Virginia (10–3–1)	TCU (10–0–1)	UCLA (12–1–1)	UCLA (12–1–2)	UCLA (13–1–2)	Virginia (14–4–2)	Virginia (14–4–3)	3.
4.	UCLA (0–0–0)	UCLA (1–0–0)	UCLA (2–0–0)	UCLA (3–0–0)	Vanderbilt (9–4–0)	Vanderbilt (9–4–0)	Vanderbilt (9–4–0)	Vanderbilt (9–4–0)	TCU (9–0–1)	UCLA (10–1–1)	West Virginia (10–2–1)	West Virginia (10–2–1)	Virginia (12–4–2)	Santa Clara (10–1–0)	North Carolina (17–2–0)	4.
5.	Vanderbilt (8–4–0)	Vanderbilt (8–4–0)	Vanderbilt (8–4–0)	Vanderbilt (8–4–0)	Virginia (9–3–1)	Virginia (10–3–1)	Virginia (10–3–1)	Virginia (10–3–1)	UCLA (8–1–1)	West Virginia (10–2–0)	Virginia (10–4–2)	Virginia (10–4–2)	Texas A&M (12–3–0)	Texas A&M (12–4–1)	Texas A&M (12–4–1)	5.
6.	Virginia (8–3–1)	Virginia (8–3–1)	Virginia (8–3–1)	Virginia (8–3–1)	California (2–0–0)	Texas A&M (8–2–0)	Texas A&M (8–2–0)	TCU (9–0–1)	West Virginia (9–2–0)	Virginia (10–4–1)	Texas A&M (11–3–0)	Texas A&M (11–3–0)	Duke (11–5–3)	Duke (12–5–4)	Duke (12–5–4)	6.
7.	Arkansas (8–2–0)	Arkansas (8–2–0)	Arkansas (8–2–0)	Arkansas (8–2–0)	Texas A&M (8–2–0)	TCU (8–0–1)	TCU (8–0–1)	Duke (9–4–2)	Duke (9–5–2)	Duke (10–5–2)	Duke (10–5–3)	Duke (10–5–3)	TCU (12–1–1)	TCU (12–2–2)	TCU (12–2–2)	7.
8.	Texas A&M (7–2–0)	Texas A&M (7–2–0)	Texas A&M (7–2–0)	Texas A&M (8–2–0)	TCU (8–0–1)	Duke (8–4–2)	Duke (8–4–2)	Texas A&M (9–3–0)	Texas A&M (10–3–0)	Texas A&M (10–3–0)	TCU (10–1–1)	TCU (11–1–1)	Clemson (12–4–1)	Clemson (12–5–2)	Clemson (12–5–2)	8.
9.	TCU (8–0–1)	TCU (8–0–1)	TCU (8–0–1)	TCU (8–0–1)	Duke (7–4–2)	West Virginia (8–2–0)	West Virginia (8–2–0)	West Virginia (8–2–0)	South Carolina (10–3–0)	South Carolina (10–3–0)	Clemson (12–4–0)	Clemson (12–4–0)	Arkansas (12–3–0)	UCLA (13–1–3)	UCLA (13–1–3)	9.
10.	BYU (0–0–0)	BYU (1–0–0)	BYU (1–1–0)	USC (1–0–0)	West Virginia (7–2–0)	South Carolina (8–3–0)	South Carolina (8–3–0)	South Carolina (9–3–0)	Vanderbilt (9–5–0)	Vanderbilt (9–5–0)	Vanderbilt (9–5–1)	Vanderbilt (9–5–1)	Penn State (12–2–1)	Arkansas (12–4–0)	Arkansas (12–4–0)	10.
11.	Duke (7–4–2)	Duke (7–4–2)	Duke (7–4–2)	Duke (7–4–2)	South Carolina (7–3–0)	Clemson (9–4–0)	Clemson (9–4–0)	Clemson (10–4–0)	Clemson (10–4–0)	Clemson (11–4–0)	Arkansas (11–3–0)	Arkansas (11–3–0)	Oklahoma State (13–3–1)	Penn State (12–3–1)	Penn State (12–3–1)	11.
12.	West Virginia (7–2–0)	West Virginia (7–2–0)	West Virginia (7–2–0)	West Virginia (7–2–0)	Clemson (8–4–0)	USC (3–1–0)	USC (3–2–0)	Arkansas (11–3–0)	Arkansas (11–3–0)	Arkansas (11–3–0)	Penn State (10–1–1)	South Florida (9–0–2)	Georgetown (12–0–1)	Oklahoma State (13–3–2)	Oklahoma State (13–3–2)	12.
13.	Penn State (0–0–0)	Penn State (0–0–0)	Penn State (0–0–0)	South Carolina (6–3–0)	USC (1–1–0)	Washington State (4–0–1)	Washington State (4–0–1)	Oklahoma State (10–2–1)	Oklahoma State (11–2–1)	South Florida (7–0–1)	South Carolina (10–4–0)	Penn State (10–2–1)	Santa Clara (8–1–0)	Georgetown (12–0–2)	Georgetown (12–0–2)	13.
14.	USC (0–0–0)	USC (0–0–0)	USC (0–0–0)	California (0–0–0)	Washington State (4–0–1)	Arkansas (10–3–0)	Arkansas (10–3–0)	South Florida (5–0–1)	South Florida (6–0–1)	Penn State (9–1–1)	South Florida (7–0–2)	South Carolina (10–4–0)	Washington (9–3–4)	Washington (9–4–4)	Washington (9–4–4)	14.
15.	South Carolina (6–3–0)	South Carolina (6–3–0)	South Carolina (6–3–0)	Washington State (3–0–0)	Arkansas (10–3–0)	Oklahoma State (8–2–1)	Oklahoma State (9–2–1)	Penn State (6–1–1)	Penn State (8–1–1)	Oklahoma State (11–3–1)	Oklahoma State (12–3–1)	Oklahoma State (12–3–1)	Ole Miss (10–5–2)	Ole Miss (10–6–2)	Ole Miss (10–6–2)	15.
16.	California (0–0–0)	California (0–0–0)	California (0–0–0)	Clemson (6–4–0)	Oklahoma State (7–2–1)	California (3–1–0)	South Florida (4–0–1)	Santa Clara (3–0–0)	Santa Clara (5–0–0)	Santa Clara (6–1–0)	Santa Clara (6–1–0)	Santa Clara (7–1–0)	Rice (14–2–1)	Rice (14–3–1)	Rice (14–3–1)	16.
17.	Clemson (6–4–0)	Clemson (6–4–0)	Clemson (6–4–0)	Oklahoma State (6–2–1)	South Florida (2–0–0)	South Florida (3–0–1)	Stanford (4–2–0)	Hofstra (5–0–0)	Hofstra (6–0–0)	Hofstra (6–0–1)	Hofstra (7–0–1)	Hofstra (7–1–1)	West Virginia (10–3–1)	West Virginia (10–3–1)	West Virginia (10–3–1)	17.
18.	Oklahoma State (6–2–1)	Oklahoma State (6–2–1)	Oklahoma State (6–2–1)	South Florida (2–0–0)	Michigan (1–0–1)	Stanford (3–2–0)	Penn State (4–1–1)	Georgetown (8–0–0)	Georgetown (9–0–1)	Georgetown (9–0–1)	Georgetown (9–0–1)	Georgetown (11–0–1)	Vanderbilt (9–6–1)	Vanderbilt (9–6–1)	Vanderbilt (9–6–1)	18.
19.	Washington State (0–0–0)	Washington State (1–0–0)	Washington State (2–0–0)	Michigan (0–0–1)	Stanford (1–2–0)	Penn State (4–1–0)	Santa Clara (3–0–0)	USC (3–3–1)	USC (4–3–1)	USC (6–3–1)	USC (7–3–2)	USC (7–3–3)	South Florida (10–1–2)	South Florida (10–1–2)	South Florida (10–1–2)	19.
20.	Michigan (0–0–0)	Michigan (0–0–0)	Michigan (0–0–0)	Penn State (0–1–0)	Penn State (2–1–0)	BYU (4–2–0)	Hofstra (3–0–0)	Washington (5–1–2)	Washington (6–1–2)	Saint Louis (11–1–0)	Saint Louis (13–1–0)	Saint Louis (15–1–0)	South Carolina (11–5–0)	South Carolina (11–5–0)	South Carolina (11–5–0)	20.
21.	Santa Clara (0–0–0)	Santa Clara (0–0–0)	Santa Clara (0–0–0)	BYU (1–2–0)	BYU (2–2–0)	Santa Clara (2–0–0)	Georgetown (6–0–0)	Washington State (4–1–1)	Washington State (5–1–1)	BYU (9–3–1)	BYU (10–3–1)	BYU (11–3–1)	USC (7–3–4)	USC (7–3–4)	USC (7–3–4)	21.
22.	Memphis (0–0–0)	Memphis (1–0–0)	Memphis (1–0–0)	Santa Clara (0–0–0)	Santa Clara (1–0–0)	Hofstra (3–0–0)	Kansas (6–3–2)	California (4–2–0)	BYU (8–3–0)	Washington (6–3–2)	Washington (8–3–2)	Campbell (9–2–1)	Saint Louis (15–1–1)	Saint Louis (15–1–1)	Saint Louis (15–1–1)	22.
23.	Hofstra (0–0–0)	Hofstra (0–0–0)	Hofstra (0–0–0)	Memphis (1–0–0)	Memphis (2–0–0)	Kansas (6–3–1)	Arizona State (6–0–2)	Stanford (6–3–0)	Saint Louis (9–1–0)	Arizona (8–4–0)	Rutgers (8–2–3)	Washington (8–3–3)	BYU (11–4–1)	BYU (11–4–1)	BYU (11–4–1)	23.
24.	Kansas (5–3–1)	Kansas (5–3–1)	Kansas (5–3–1)	Hofstra (1–0–0)	Hofstra (2–0–0)	Arizona State (5–0–1)	California (3–2–0)	BYU (6–3–0)	Stanford (5–3–1)	Ohio State (6–1–3)	High Point (9–0–0)	Rutgers (8–3–3)	Rutgers (9–3–4)	Rutgers (9–3–4)	Rutgers (9–3–4)	24.
25.	Pepperdine (0–0–0)	South Florida (1–0–0)	South Florida (1–0–0)	Kansas (5–3–1)	Kansas (5–3–1)	Georgetown (4–0–0)	BYU (4–3–0)	Saint Louis (8–1–0)	Arizona State (7–1–2)	Pepperdine (6–3–1)	Memphis (8–2–0)	Memphis (8–3–0)	Memphis (8–4–0)	Memphis (8–4–0)	Memphis (8–4–0)	25.
	Preseason Feb 1	Week 1 Feb 8	Week 2 Feb 15	Week 3 Feb 22	Week 4 Mar 1	Week 5 Mar 8	Week 6 Mar 15	Week 7 Mar 22	Week 8 Mar 29	Week 9 Apr 5	Week 10 Apr 12	Week 11 Apr 19	Week 12 May 3	Week 13 May 10	Final May 18	
		Dropped: No. 25 Pepperdine	None	None	None	Dropped: No. 18 Michigan; No. 23 Memphis	None	Dropped: No. 22 Kansas; No. 23 Arizona State	Dropped: No. 22 California	Dropped: No. 21 Washington State; No. 24 Stanford; No. 25 Arizona State	Dropped: No. 23 Arizona; No. 24 Ohio State; No. 25 Pepperdine	Dropped: No. 24 High Point	Dropped: No. 17 Hofstra; No. 22 Campbell	None	None	
