= 2019 Clemson Tigers women's soccer team =

American collegiate soccer season

2019 Clemson Tigers women's soccer

NCAA Tournament, Second Round
- Conference: Atlantic Coast Conference
- U. Soc. Coaches poll: No. RV
- TopDrawerSoccer.com: No. 18
- Record: 11–7–2 (5–5–0 ACC)
- Head coach: Eddie Radwanski (9th season)
- Assistant coaches: Jeff Robbins (9th season); Siri Mullinix (9th season)
- Home stadium: Riggs Field

2019 ACC women's soccer standings
	Conf.						Overall
Team	W		L		T	PCT	W		L		T	PCT
No. 2 North Carolina ‍†‍‡‍^{y}	9	–	0	–	1	.950	24	–	1	–	2	.926
No. 7 Florida State ‍‍‍^{y}	8	–	2	–	0	.800	18	–	6	–	0	.750
No. 9 Virginia ‍‍‍^{y}	6	–	0	–	3	.833	17	–	2	–	3	.841
No. 25 Louisville ‍‍‍^{y}	5	–	3	–	2	.600	13	–	5	–	2	.700
No. 17 NC State ‍‍‍^{y}	4	–	2	–	4	.600	12	–	7	–	4	.609
No. 18 Duke ‍‍‍^{y}	3	–	1	–	6	.600	9	–	4	–	7	.625
Clemson ‍‍‍^{y}	5	–	5	–	0	.500	11	–	7	–	2	.600
Notre Dame ‍‍‍^{y}	4	–	4	–	2	.500	11	–	8	–	2	.571
Virginia Tech ‍‍‍^{y}	4	–	4	–	2	.500	12	–	5	–	2	.684
Pittsburgh ‍‍‍	2	–	6	–	2	.300	5	–	10	–	3	.361
Miami ‍‍‍	2	–	7	–	1	.250	5	–	9	–	2	.375
Wake Forest ‍‍‍	1	–	6	–	3	.250	6	–	8	–	4	.444
Syracuse ‍‍‍	1	–	7	–	1	.167	3	–	11	–	2	.250
Boston College ‍‍‍	1	–	8	–	1	.150	8	–	8	–	2	.500
† – Conference champion ‡ – 2019 ACC Tournament champion y – Invited to the NCAA Tournament; As of December 10, 2019; Rankings from United Soccer Coaches Poll; Source: The ACC

The 2019 Clemson Tigers women's soccer team represented Clemson University during the 2019 NCAA Division I women's soccer season. The Tigers were led by head coach Ed Radwanski, in his eighth season. Home games were played at Riggs Field. This was the team's 26th season playing organized soccer. All of those seasons were played in the Atlantic Coast Conference.

== Previous season ==
The 2018 Clemson women's soccer team finished the season with a 12–9–0 overall record and a 6–4–0 ACC record. The Tigers qualified for the ACC Tournament as the fifth-seed. The Tigers overcame Boston College in the Quarterfinals, but fell 0–1 to North Carolina in the Semifinals. The Tigers earned an at-large bid into the 2018 NCAA Division I Women's Soccer Tournament for the sixth season in a row. As an unseeded team in the Stanford Bracket, Clemson lost to Ole Miss at home 1–2 to end their season.

== Offseason ==
=== Departures ===
Name	Number	Pos.	Height	Year	Hometown	Reason for departure
Miranda Weslake	2	FW	5'6"	(redshirt) Senior	Beaufort, SC	Graduated
Alana Hockenhull	10	MF/FW	5'8"	Senior	Vero Beach, FL	Graduated
Sam Staab	15	DF	5'7"	Senior	San Diego, CA	Graduated, Drafted 4th overall by Washington Spirit in 2019 NWSL College Draft
Ellen Colborn	22	FW	5'5"	Senior	Colleyville, TX	Graduated

=== Recruiting class ===
Name	Nationality	Hometown	Club	TDS Rating
Lauren Bruns; MF	USA	Richmond, VA	Richmond United	2/5 stars
Caroline Conti; FW	USA	Greenville, SC	Carolina Elite Soccer Academy	4/5 stars
Abigail Hanks; DF	USA	Ellicott City, MD	Bethesda SC	4/5 stars
Katherine Hershfelt; MF	USA	Atlanta, GA	Concorde Fire SC	3/5 stars
Hannah McLaughlin; GK	USA	Glen Allen, VA	Richmond United	2/5 stars
Maliah Morris; FW	USA	Germantown, MD	Bethesda SC	4/5 stars
Harper White; DF	USA	Franklin, TN	Tennessee SC	4/5 stars

== Squad ==
=== Roster ===
Updated November 26, 2019

Note: Flags indicate national team as defined under FIFA eligibility rules; some limited exceptions apply. Players may hold more than one non-FIFA nationality.

No.	Pos.	Nation	Player
1	GK	ENG	Sandy MacIver
3	FW	USA	Mackenzie Smith
4	DF	USA	Harper White
5	MF	USA	Grace Wagner
7	DF	USA	Sydney Dawson
8	MF	USA	Haley Schueppert
9	MF	USA	Audrey Viso
11	MF	USA	Kimber Haley
12	DF	USA	Sarah Osborne
13	DF	USA	Dani Antieau
14	DF	USA	Abigail Mitchell
15	MF	USA	Hal Hershfelt
16	MF	USA	Julie Mackin

No.	Pos.	Nation	Player
17	FW	VEN	Mariana Speckmaier
19	MF	USA	Renee Guion
20	FW	USA	Courtney Jones
21	FW	USA	Maliah Morris
22	FW	USA	Lauren Burns
23	FW	USA	Caroline Conti
24	GK	USA	Maddie Weber
25	FW	USA	Olivia Bonacorso
26	GK	USA	Hannah McLaughlin
28	DF	USA	Abby Hanks
30	FW	USA	Patrice DiPasquale
38	DF	USA	Jackson Moehler

== Team management ==
Position	Staff
Athletic Director	(United States) Dan Radakovich
Head coach	(United States) Eddie Radwanski
Associate Head Coach	(United States) Jeff Robbins
Assistant coach	(United States) Siri Mullinix
Director of operations	(United States) Julie Carson
Assistant Athletic Trainer	(United States) Kelly Turney

== Schedule ==
Date Time, TV	Rank^{#}	Opponent^{#}	Result	Record	Site City, State
Exhibition
August 13*; 7:00 p.m.		at Furman	T 1–1 (4–1 PK)	–	Stone Stadium (–); Greenville, SC
August 17*; 6:00 p.m.		at Liberty	Completed	–	Liberty Soccer Stadium; Lynchburg, VA
Non-conference regular season
August 22*; 7:00 p.m.		Utah	W 2–0	1–0–0	Riggs Field (0); Clemson, SC
August 25*; 6:00 p.m.		Coastal Carolina	W 6–0	2–0–0	Riggs Field (1,562); Clemson, SC
August 30*; 8:05 p.m.		at Nebraska	W 2–1	3–0–0	Barbara Hibner Soccer Stadium (1,130); Lincoln, NE
September 1*; 1:00 p.m.		at Creighton	W 1–0	4–0–0	Morrison Stadium (803); Omaha, NE
September 6*; 5:00 p.m.	No. 19	Oregon	T 1–1 ^{2OT}	4–0–1	Riggs Field (1,523); Clemson, SC
September 8*; 6:00 p.m.	No. 19	Georgia	W 2–1	5–0–1	Riggs Field (852); Clemson, SC
September 15*; 6:00 p.m.	No. 20	No. 7 South Carolina; Rivalry	W 1–0	6–0–1	Riggs Field (1,625); Clemson, SC
Conference Regular season
September 20; 5:00 p.m.	No. 10	Notre Dame	W 1–0	7–0–1 (1–0–0)	Riggs Field (1,184); Clemson, SC
September 26; 7:00 p.m.	No. 9	No. 6 Florida State	L 1–2	7–1–1 (1–1–0)	Riggs Field (1,052); Clemson, SC
September 29; 1:00 p.m.	No. 6	No. 16 Virginia Tech	W 3–1	8–1–1 (2–1–0)	Riggs Field (753); Clemson, SC
October 5; 5:00 p.m.	No. 8	at No. 3 North Carolina	L 0–1	8–2–1 (2–2–0)	Dorrance Field (2,783); Chapel Hill, NC
October 10; 7:00 p.m.	No. 9	at No. 16 Louisville	L 0–1	8–3–1 (2–3–0)	Lynn Stadium (652); Louisville, KY
October 13; 1:00 p.m.	No. 9	at No. 10 Duke	L 1–4	8–4–1 (2–4–0)	Koskinen Stadium (313); Durham, NC
October 19; 7:00 p.m.	No. 17	Syracuse	W 4–1	9–4–1 (3–4–0)	Riggs Field (293); Clemson, SC
October 24; 7:00 p.m.	No. 15	at Miami	L 2–3 ^{2OT}	9–5–1 (3–5–0)	Cobb Stadium (500); Coral Gables, FL
October 27; 1:00 p.m.	No. 15	Pittsburgh	W 3–2 ^{OT}	10–5–1 (4–5–0)	Riggs Field (912); Clemson, SC
October 31; 7:00 p.m.	No. 22	at Boston College	W 2–1	11–5–1 (5–5–0)	Newton Soccer Complex (111); Chestnut Hill, MA
ACC tournament
November 3; 1:00 p.m.	(7) No. 22	at (2) No. 5 Florida State; Quarterfinals	L 1–2	11–6–1	Seminole Soccer Complex (991); Tallahassee, FL
NCAA tournament
November 15; 5:00 p.m.		Vanderbilt; First Round	T 0–0 (5–4 PKs)	11–6–2	Riggs Field (324); Clemson, SC
November 22; 11:00 p.m.		at No. 7 UCLA; Second Round	L 0–5	11–7–2	Wallis Annenberg Stadium (1,332); Los Angeles, CA
*Non-conference game. ^{#}Rankings from United Soccer Coaches. (#) Tournament seedings in parentheses.

== Goals Record ==
Rank	No.	Nat.	Po.	Name	Regular season	ACC Tournament	NCAA Tournament	Total
1	17	(Venezuela)	FW	Mariana Speckmaier	6	0	0	6
2	13	(United States)	DF	Dani Antieau	4	0	0	4
2	21	(United States)	FW	Maliah Morris	4	0	0	4
4	3	(United States)	MF	Mackenzie Smith	3	0	0	3
4	15	(United States)	MF	Hal Hershfelt	3	0	0	3
4	16	(United States)	MF	Julie Mackin	3	0	0	3
7	11	(United States)	MF	Kimber Haley	2	0	0	2
7	23	(United States)	FW	Caroline Conti	2	0	0	2
9	4	(United States)	DF	Harpert White	1	0	0	1
9	19	(United States)	MF	Renee Guion	1	0	0	1
9	22	(United States)	FW	Lauren Bruns	0	1	0	1
9	28	(United States)	DF	Abby Hanks	1	0	0	1
9	30	(United States)	FW	Patrice DiPasquale	1	0	0	1
9	38	(United States)	DF	Jackson Moehler	1	0	0	1
Total					32	1	0	33

== Disciplinary record ==
Rank	No.	Nat.	Po.	Name	Regular Season			ACC Tournament			NCAA Tournament			Total		
Rank	No.	Nat.	Po.	Name	Booked	(yellow card) (yellow-red card)	Sent off (straight red)	Booked	(yellow card) (yellow-red card)	Sent off (straight red)	Booked	(yellow card) (yellow-red card)	Sent off (straight red)	Booked	(yellow card) (yellow-red card)	Sent off (straight red)
1	11	(United States)	Kimber Haley	MF	3	0	0	0	0	0	1	0	0	4	0	0
2	7	(United States)	Sydney Dawson	DF	2	0	0	0	0	0	1	0	0	3	0	0
3	3	(United States)	Mackenzie Smith	DF	2	0	0	0	0	0	0	0	0	2	0	0
3	13	(United States)	Dani Antieau	DF	1	0	0	0	0	0	1	0	0	2	0	0
3	16	(United States)	Julie Mackin	MF	0	0	1	0	0	0	0	0	0	0	0	1
5	4	(United States)	Harpert White	DF	1	0	0	0	0	0	0	0	0	1	0	0
5	15	(United States)	Hal Hershfelt	MF	1	0	0	0	0	0	0	0	0	1	0	0
5	20	(United States)	Courtney Jones	FW	1	0	0	0	0	0	0	0	0	1	0	0
5	25	(United States)	Olivia Bonacorso	FW	1	0	0	0	0	0	0	0	0	1	0	0
5	38	(United States)	Jackson Moehler	DF	0	0	0	1	0	0	0	0	0	1	0	0
Total					12	0	1	1	0	0	3	0	0	16	0	1

== Awards and honors ==
Recipient	Award	Date	Ref.
Sandy MacIver	Hermann Trophy Watchlist	August 1, 2019	
Mariana Speckmaier	Pre-season All-ACC Team	August 8, 2019	
Hannah McLaughlin	ACC Defensive Player of the Week	September 3, 2019	
Maliah Morris	ACC Offensive Player of the Week	September 17, 2019	
Hal Hershfelt	ACC All-Freshman Team	November 7, 2019	
Maliah Morris	ACC All-Freshman Team	November 7, 2019	

== Rankings ==
Ranking movement Legend: ██ Improvement in ranking. ██ Decrease in ranking. ██ Not ranked the previous week. RV=Others receiving votes.
Poll	Pre	Wk 1	Wk 2	Wk 3	Wk 4	Wk 5	Wk 6	Wk 7	Wk 8	Wk 9	Wk 10	Wk 11	Wk 12	Wk 13	Wk 14	Wk 15	Wk 16	Final
United Soccer	RV	RV	19	20	10	9	8	9	17	15	22	25	RV	None Released				RV
TopDrawer Soccer	RV	RV	RV	22	RV	23	20	20	17	18	16	20	19	21	17	18	18	18
