= 2019 Miami Hurricanes women's soccer team =

2019 Miami Hurricanes women's soccer
- Conference: Atlantic Coast Conference
- Record: 5–9–2 (2–7–1 ACC)
- Head coach: Sarah Barnes (2nd season)
- Assistant coaches: Alan Fread (2nd season); Jeremy Williams (2nd season)
- Home stadium: Cobb Stadium

2019 ACC women's soccer standings
| | Conf. | | | | | | Overall |
| Team | W | | L | | T | PCT | W | | L | | T | PCT |
|---|---|---|---|---|---|---|---|---|---|---|---|---|
| No. 2 North Carolina ‍†‍‡‍^{y} | 9 | – | 0 | – | 1 | .950 | 24 | – | 1 | – | 2 | .926 |
| No. 7 Florida State ‍‍‍^{y} | 8 | – | 2 | – | 0 | .800 | 18 | – | 6 | – | 0 | .750 |
| No. 9 Virginia ‍‍‍^{y} | 6 | – | 0 | – | 3 | .833 | 17 | – | 2 | – | 3 | .841 |
| No. 25 Louisville ‍‍‍^{y} | 5 | – | 3 | – | 2 | .600 | 13 | – | 5 | – | 2 | .700 |
| No. 17 NC State ‍‍‍^{y} | 4 | – | 2 | – | 4 | .600 | 12 | – | 7 | – | 4 | .609 |
| No. 18 Duke ‍‍‍^{y} | 3 | – | 1 | – | 6 | .600 | 9 | – | 4 | – | 7 | .625 |
| Clemson ‍‍‍^{y} | 5 | – | 5 | – | 0 | .500 | 11 | – | 7 | – | 2 | .600 |
| Notre Dame ‍‍‍^{y} | 4 | – | 4 | – | 2 | .500 | 11 | – | 8 | – | 2 | .571 |
| Virginia Tech ‍‍‍^{y} | 4 | – | 4 | – | 2 | .500 | 12 | – | 5 | – | 2 | .684 |
| Pittsburgh ‍‍‍ | 2 | – | 6 | – | 2 | .300 | 5 | – | 10 | – | 3 | .361 |
| Miami ‍‍‍ | 2 | – | 7 | – | 1 | .250 | 5 | – | 9 | – | 2 | .375 |
| Wake Forest ‍‍‍ | 1 | – | 6 | – | 3 | .250 | 6 | – | 8 | – | 4 | .444 |
| Syracuse ‍‍‍ | 1 | – | 7 | – | 1 | .167 | 3 | – | 11 | – | 2 | .250 |
| Boston College ‍‍‍ | 1 | – | 8 | – | 1 | .150 | 8 | – | 8 | – | 2 | .500 |
† – Conference champion ‡ – 2019 ACC Tournament champion y – Invited to the NCAA Tournament; As of December 10, 2019; Rankings from United Soccer Coaches Poll; Source: The ACC

The 2019 Miami Hurricanes women's soccer team represented University of Miami during the 2019 NCAA Division I women's soccer season. The Hurricanes were led by head coach Sarah Barnes, in her second season. They played home games at Cobb Stadium. This is the team's 21st season playing organized women's college soccer and their 16th playing in the Atlantic Coast Conference.

The Hurricanes finished the season 5–9–2 overall, and 2–7–1 in ACC play to finish in eleventh place. They did not qualify for the ACC Tournament and were not invited to the NCAA Tournament.

== Squad ==
=== Roster ===
Updated August 3, 2020 Note: Flags indicate national team as defined under FIFA eligibility rules; some limited exceptions apply. Players may hold more than one non-FIFA nationality.

| No. | Pos. | Nation | Player |
|---|---|---|---|
| 0 | GK | CAN | Melissa Dagenais |
| 1 | GK | USA | Tyler Speaks |
| 2 | DF | USA | Morgan Ledenko |
| 5 | DF | NOR | Mari Horpestad |
| 7 | FW | USA | Michelle Giamportone |
| 8 | FW | ISL | Gudrun Haralz |
| 9 | FW | USA | Dejah Cason |
| 10 | MF | USA | Kristina Fisher |
| 11 | MF | NOR | Ine Østmo |
| 12 | DF | USA | Sierra Frey |
| 13 | DF | USA | Hannah Marwede |

| No. | Pos. | Nation | Player |
|---|---|---|---|
| 14 | DF | USA | Selena Fortich |
| 15 | MF | USA | Lauren Markwith |
| 16 | FW | USA | Jackie Koerwitz |
| 17 | MF | ISL | María Jakobsdóttir |
| 20 | DF | USA | Bayleigh Chaviers |
| 21 | FW | USA | Jaclyn Marra |
| 22 | FW | USA | Taylor Shell |
| 23 | MF | USA | Tia Dupont |
| 24 | DF | USA | Morgan Asmussen |
| 25 | DF | USA | Lexi Castellano-Mugica |
| 26 | MF | USA | Emma Tucker |

=== Team management ===
| Position | Staff |
|---|---|
| Head coach | Sarah Barnes |
| Assistant Coach | Alan Fread |
| Assistant Coach | Jeremy Williams |
| Volunteer Assistant Coach | Aubri Williamson |
| Director of Operations | Nicholas Petrucelli |

== Schedule ==
| Date Time, TV | Rank^{#} | Opponent^{#} | Result | Record | Site (Attendance) City, State |
Exhibition
| August 12*; 6:00 p.m. | | at Florida Gulf Coast | | – | FGCU Soccer Complex; Fort Myers, FL |
| August 15*; 8:00 p.m. | | FC Surge | W 6–2 | – | Cobb Stadium; Coral Gables, FL |
| August 18*; 7:00 p.m. | | Miami Men's Club Team | | – | Cobb Stadium; Coral Gables, FL |
Non-conference regular season
| August 22*; 8:00 p.m. | | at UTRGV | W 4–0 | 1–0–0 | UTRGV Soccer and Track Field (1,080); Edinburg, TX |
| August 25*; 12:00 p.m. | | vs. Fairleigh Dickinson | W 4–1 | 2–0–0 | UTRGV Soccer and Track Field (150); Edinburg, TX |
| August 29*; 7:00 p.m. | | Florida Atlantic | L 1–2 | 2–1–0 | Cobb Stadium (453); Coral Gables, FL |
| September 7*; 7:00 p.m. | | San Diego State | T 1–1 ^{2OT} | 2–1–1 | Cobb Stadium (430); Coral Gables, FL |
| September 12*; 7:00 p.m. | | Stetson | W 4–0 | 3–1–1 | Cobb Stadium (407); Coral Gables, FL |
| September 15*; 6:00 p.m. | | at Florida | L 0–3 | 3–2–1 | James G. Pressly Stadium (746); Gainesville, FL |
ACC regular season
| September 21; 7:00 p.m. | | at No. 18 Virginia Tech | L 0–2 | 0–1–0 (3–3–1) | Thompson Field (947); Blacksburg, VA |
| September 26; 7:00 p.m. | | at Boston College | L 0–4 | 0–2–0 (3–4–1) | Newton Campus Soccer Field (199); Chestnut Hill, MA |
| September 29; 7:00 p.m. | | Pittsburgh | T 3–3 ^{2OT} | 0–2–1 (3–4–2) | Cobb Stadium (550); Coral Gables, FL |
| October 4; 8:00 p.m. | | No. 1 Virginia | L 0–3 | 0–3–1 (3–5–2) | Cobb Stadium (700); Coral Gables, FL |
| October 10; 7:00 p.m. | | at Notre Dame | L 0–3 | 0–4–1 (3–6–2) | Alumni Stadium (507); Notre Dame, IN |
| October 13; 1:00 p.m. | | at Syracuse | W 2–1 | 1–4–1 (4–6–2) | SU Soccer Stadium (438); Syracuse, NY |
| October 18; 5:00 p.m. | | at Florida State; Rivalry | L 0–3 | 1–5–1 (4–7–2) | Seminole Soccer Complex (670); Tallahassee, FL |
| October 24; 7:00 p.m. | | No. 15 Clemson | W 3–2 ^{2OT} | 2–5–1 (5–7–2) | Cobb Stadium (500); Coral Gables, FL |
| October 27; 12:00 p.m. | | No. 12 Louisville | L 0–1 | 2–6–1 (5–8–2) | Cobb Stadium (500); Coral Gables, FL |
| October 31; 7:30 p.m. | | No. 3 North Carolina | L 2–3 | 2–7–1 (5–9–2) | Cobb Stadium (750); Coral Gables, FL |
*Non-conference game. ^{#}Rankings from United Soccer Coaches. (#) Tournament seedings in parentheses.

== Rankings ==
Ranking movement Legend: ██ Improvement in ranking. ██ Decrease in ranking. ██ Not ranked the previous week. RV=Others receiving votes.
| Poll | Pre | Wk 1 | Wk 2 | Wk 3 | Wk 4 | Wk 5 | Wk 6 | Wk 7 | Wk 8 | Wk 9 | Wk 10 | Wk 11 | Wk 12 | Wk 13 | Wk 14 | Wk 15 | Wk 16 | Final |
|---|---|---|---|---|---|---|---|---|---|---|---|---|---|---|---|---|---|---|
| United Soccer | | | | | | | | | | | | | | None Released | | | | |
| TopDrawer Soccer | | | | | | | | | | | | | | | | | | |
