= 2019 Boston College Eagles women's soccer team =

American college soccer season

2019 Boston College Eagles women's soccer
- Conference: Atlantic Coast Conference
- Record: 8–8–2 (1–8–1 ACC)
- Head coach: Jason Lowe (1st season)
- Assistant coaches: Rachel Moreland (1st season); Jami Kranich (1st season)
- Home stadium: Newton Campus Soccer Field

2019 ACC women's soccer standings
	Conf.						Overall
Team	W		L		T	PCT	W		L		T	PCT
No. 2 North Carolina ‍†‍‡‍^{y}	9	–	0	–	1	.950	24	–	1	–	2	.926
No. 7 Florida State ‍‍‍^{y}	8	–	2	–	0	.800	18	–	6	–	0	.750
No. 9 Virginia ‍‍‍^{y}	6	–	0	–	3	.833	17	–	2	–	3	.841
No. 25 Louisville ‍‍‍^{y}	5	–	3	–	2	.600	13	–	5	–	2	.700
No. 17 NC State ‍‍‍^{y}	4	–	2	–	4	.600	12	–	7	–	4	.609
No. 18 Duke ‍‍‍^{y}	3	–	1	–	6	.600	9	–	4	–	7	.625
Clemson ‍‍‍^{y}	5	–	5	–	0	.500	11	–	7	–	2	.600
Notre Dame ‍‍‍^{y}	4	–	4	–	2	.500	11	–	8	–	2	.571
Virginia Tech ‍‍‍^{y}	4	–	4	–	2	.500	12	–	5	–	2	.684
Pittsburgh ‍‍‍	2	–	6	–	2	.300	5	–	10	–	3	.361
Miami ‍‍‍	2	–	7	–	1	.250	5	–	9	–	2	.375
Wake Forest ‍‍‍	1	–	6	–	3	.250	6	–	8	–	4	.444
Syracuse ‍‍‍	1	–	7	–	1	.167	3	–	11	–	2	.250
Boston College ‍‍‍	1	–	8	–	1	.150	8	–	8	–	2	.500
† – Conference champion ‡ – 2019 ACC Tournament champion y – Invited to the NCAA Tournament; As of December 10, 2019; Rankings from United Soccer Coaches Poll; Source: The ACC

The 2019 Boston College Eagles women's soccer team represented Boston College during the 2019 NCAA Division I women's soccer season. The Eagles were led by head coach Jason Lowe, in his first season. They played home games at Newton Campus Soccer Field. This is the team's 39th season playing organized women's college soccer, and their 15th playing in the Atlantic Coast Conference.

The Eagles finished the season 8–8–2 overall, and 1–8–1 in ACC play to finish in fourteenth place. They did not qualify for the ACC Tournament and were not invited to the NCAA Tournament.

== Squad ==
=== Roster ===
Updated October 8, 2020

Note: Flags indicate national team as defined under FIFA eligibility rules; some limited exceptions apply. Players may hold more than one non-FIFA nationality.

No.	Pos.	Nation	Player
0	GK	USA	Maddie Murphy
1	GK	USA	Allie Augur
2	FW	USA	Lindsay Groves
4	FW	USA	Jenna Bike
5	DF	USA	Erin Convery
6	MF	USA	Emily Langenderfer
7	MF	USA	Gaby Carreiro
8	DF	USA	Emily Weintraub
9	MF	USA	Sam Smith
10	FW	USA	Kayla Duran
11	DF	USA	Becca McCourt
12	FW	USA	Francesca Venezia
13	MF	USA	Jade Ruiters

No.	Pos.	Nation	Player
14	MF	USA	Kayla Jennings
15	MF	USA	Samantha Agresti
17	MF	USA	Hailee Perri
18	FW	USA	Olivia Vaughn
20	MF	USA	Alison Heckman
21	MF	USA	Riley Lochhead
22	MF	USA	Jillian Jennings
23	DF	USA	Michela Agresti
24	DF	USA	Mia Karras
25	GK	USA	Mackenzie Egan
26	DF	USA	Gianna Mitchell
27	DF	USA	Sydney Moore
31	GK	USA	Alexis Lema

=== Team management ===
Position	Staff
Head coach	Jason Lowe
Assistant coach	Rachel Moreland
Assistant coach	Jami Kranich

== Schedule ==
Date Time, TV	Rank^{#}	Opponent^{#}	Result	Record	Site (Attendance) City, State
Exhibition
August 12*; 5:00 p.m.		Colgate	W 1–0	–	Newton Campus Soccer Field; Chestnut Hill, MA
August 17*; 6:00 p.m.		at Vermont	W 3–1	–	Virtue Field; Burlington, VT
Non-conference regular season
August 22*; 7:00 p.m., ACCNX		UMass	W 2–1	1–0–0	Newton Campus Soccer Field (247); Chestnut Hill, MA
August 25*; 5:30 p.m., ACCNX		UMass Lowell	W 4–1	2–0–0	Newton Campus Soccer Field (949); Chestnut Hill, MA
August 29*; 5:30 p.m., ACCNX		Boston University	W 3–0	3–0–0	Newton Campus Soccer Field (388); Chestnut Hill, MA
September 1*; 7:00 p.m.		at Princeton	W 2–1	4–0–0	Roberts Stadium (432); Princeton, NJ
September 5*; 7:00 p.m., ACCNX		Northeastern	W 1–0	5–0–0	Newton Campus Soccer Field (181); Chestnut Hill, MA
September 8*; 2:00 p.m.		New Hampshire	W 2–0	6–0–0	Newton Campus Soccer Field (440); Chestnut Hill, MA
September 12*; 5:30 p.m., ACCNX		Providence	T 1–1 ^{2OT}	6–0–1	Newton Campus Soccer Field (192); Chestnut Hill, MA
September 15*; 12:30 p.m.		at Mississippi State	W 2–0	7–0–1	MSU Soccer Field (473); Starkville, MS
ACC regular season
September 19; 7:00 p.m., ACCNX		at No. 6 Florida State	L 4–5	7–1–1 (0–1–0)	Seminole Soccer Complex (1,102); Tallahassee, FL
September 26; 7:00 p.m., ACCNX		Miami (FL)	W 4–0	8–1–1 (1–1–0)	Newton Campus Soccer Field (199); Chestnut Hill, MA
September 29; 12:00 p.m., ACCNX		No. 22 Louisville	L 1–2	8–2–1 (1–2–0)	Newton Campus Soccer Field (426); Chestnut Hill, MA
October 5; 7:00 p.m., ACCNX		at NC State	L 0–2	8–3–1 (1–3–0)	Dail Soccer Field (697); Raleigh, NC
October 10; 7:00 p.m., ACCNX		at Pittsburgh	L 1–2 ^{OT}	8–4–1 (1–4–0)	Ambrose Urbanic Field (294); Pittsburgh, PA
October 13; 1:00 p.m., ACCNX		Wake Forest	T 3–3 ^{2OT}	8–4–2 (1–4–1)	Newton Campus Soccer Field (863); Chestnut Hill, MA
October 17; 7:00 p.m., ACCNX		No. 3 North Carolina	L 0–3	8–5–2 (1–5–1)	Newton Campus Soccer Field (1,027); Chestnut Hill, MA
October 24; 7:00 p.m., ACCNX		at No. 25 Virginia Tech	L 1–2	8–6–2 (1–6–1)	Thompson Field (522); Blacksburg, VA
October 27; 1:00 p.m., ACCNX		at No. 1 Virginia	L 1–6	8–7–2 (1–7–1)	Klöckner Stadium (1,804); Charlottesville, VA
October 31; 7:00 p.m., ACCNX		No. 22 Clemson	L 1–2	8–8–2 (1–8–1)	Newton Campus Soccer Field (111); Chestnut Hill, MA
*Non-conference game. ^{#}Rankings from United Soccer Coaches. (#) Tournament seedings in parentheses.

== Rankings ==
Ranking movement Legend: ██ Improvement in ranking. ██ Decrease in ranking. ██ Not ranked the previous week. RV=Others receiving votes.
Poll	Pre	Wk 1	Wk 2	Wk 3	Wk 4	Wk 5	Wk 6	Wk 7	Wk 8	Wk 9	Wk 10	Wk 11	Wk 12	Wk 13	Wk 14	Wk 15	Wk 16	Final
United Soccer	RV	RV	RV	RV	RV	RV	RV							None Released				
TopDrawer Soccer				21	18	19	23	RV										
