= 2019 Virginia Cavaliers women's soccer team =

American college soccer season

2019 Virginia Cavaliers women's soccer

NCAA Tournament, Second Round
- Conference: Atlantic Coast Conference
- U. Soc. Coaches poll: No. 9
- TopDrawerSoccer.com: No. 9
- Record: 17–2–3 (6–0–3 ACC)
- Head coach: Steve Swanson (19th season)
- Assistant coaches: Ron Raab (14th season); Jaime Frias (1st season)
- Home stadium: Klöckner Stadium

2019 ACC women's soccer standings
	Conf.						Overall
Team	W		L		T	PCT	W		L		T	PCT
No. 2 North Carolina ‍†‍‡‍^{y}	9	–	0	–	1	.950	24	–	1	–	2	.926
No. 7 Florida State ‍‍‍^{y}	8	–	2	–	0	.800	18	–	6	–	0	.750
No. 9 Virginia ‍‍‍^{y}	6	–	0	–	3	.833	17	–	2	–	3	.841
No. 25 Louisville ‍‍‍^{y}	5	–	3	–	2	.600	13	–	5	–	2	.700
No. 17 NC State ‍‍‍^{y}	4	–	2	–	4	.600	12	–	7	–	4	.609
No. 18 Duke ‍‍‍^{y}	3	–	1	–	6	.600	9	–	4	–	7	.625
Clemson ‍‍‍^{y}	5	–	5	–	0	.500	11	–	7	–	2	.600
Notre Dame ‍‍‍^{y}	4	–	4	–	2	.500	11	–	8	–	2	.571
Virginia Tech ‍‍‍^{y}	4	–	4	–	2	.500	12	–	5	–	2	.684
Pittsburgh ‍‍‍	2	–	6	–	2	.300	5	–	10	–	3	.361
Miami ‍‍‍	2	–	7	–	1	.250	5	–	9	–	2	.375
Wake Forest ‍‍‍	1	–	6	–	3	.250	6	–	8	–	4	.444
Syracuse ‍‍‍	1	–	7	–	1	.167	3	–	11	–	2	.250
Boston College ‍‍‍	1	–	8	–	1	.150	8	–	8	–	2	.500
† – Conference champion ‡ – 2019 ACC Tournament champion y – Invited to the NCAA Tournament; As of December 10, 2019; Rankings from United Soccer Coaches Poll; Source: The ACC

The 2019 Virginia Cavaliers women's soccer team represented University of Virginia during the 2019 NCAA Division I women's soccer season. The Cavaliers were led by head coach Steve Swanson, in his nineteenth season. They played home games at Klöckner Stadium. This was the team's 34th season playing organized men's college soccer and their 32nd playing in the Atlantic Coast Conference

The Cavaliers finished the season 17–2–3, 6–0–3 in ACC play to finish in third place. As the third seed in the ACC Tournament, they defeated Duke in the quarterfinals and Florida State in the semifinals. In the final, they ended up losing to North Carolina. They received an at-large bid to the NCAA Tournament where they defeated Radford before losing to Washington State in the Second Round.

== Squad ==
=== Roster ===
Updated June 26, 2020

Note: Flags indicate national team as defined under FIFA eligibility rules; some limited exceptions apply. Players may hold more than one non-FIFA nationality.

No.	Pos.	Nation	Player
0	GK	USA	Laurel Ivory
1	GK	USA	Michaela Moran
2	MF	USA	Sydney Zandi
3	FW	USA	Ashlynn Serepca
4	FW	USA	Cam Lexow
5	DF	USA	Lizzy Sieracki
6	MF	USA	Anna Sumpter
7	FW	USA	Alexa Spaanstra
8	DF	USA	Courtney Petersen
9	FW	MEX	Diana Ordóñez
10	MF	USA	Taryn Torres
11	DF	USA	Zoe Morse
12	DF	HAI	Claire Constant

No.	Pos.	Nation	Player
13	FW	USA	Rebecca Jarrett
14	MF	USA	Emma Dawson
16	DF	USA	Phoebe McClernon
17	FW	USA	Jansen Eichenlaub
20	DF	USA	Talia Staude
21	MF	USA	Lauren Hinton
22	FW	USA	Meghan McCool
23	DF	USA	McKenna Angotti
24	DF	USA	Kira Maguire
25	FW	USA	Alissa Gorzak
26	MF	USA	Lacey McCormack
28	GK	USA	Siena Sandridge
29	GK	USA	Cayla White

=== Team management ===
Position	Staff
Athletic Director	Carla Williams
Head coach	Steve Swanson
Associate head coach	Ron Raab
Assistant Coach	Jamie Frias
Director of Operations	Eilidh Thomson

== Schedule ==
Date Time, TV	Rank^{#}	Opponent^{#}	Result	Record	Site (Attendance) City, State
Exhibition
August 15, 2019*; 1:00 p.m.	No. 9	Illinois	W 2–0	–	Keystone Soccer Complex; Maple City, MI
August 18, 2019*; 5:00 p.m.	No. 9	Richmond United U14 Boys	W 3–0	–	Klöckner Stadium; Charlottesville, VA
Non-conference regular season
August 23, 2019*; 7:00 p.m., ACCNX	No. 9	UC Irvine	W 7–0	1–0–0	Klöckner Stadium; Charlottesville, VA
August 25, 2019*; 2:00 p.m., ACCNX	No. 9	Liberty	W 6–0	2–0–0	Klöckner Stadium (1,326); Charlottesville, VA
August 30, 2019*; 5:30 p.m., ACCNX	No. 6	East Carolina	W 4–0	3–0–0	Klöckner Stadium; Charlottesville, VA
September 1, 2019*; 2:00 p.m., ACCN	No. 6	No. 12 West Virginia	W 4–1	4–0–0	Klöckner Stadium (1,854); Charlottesville, VA
September 5, 2019*; 7:00 p.m., ACCN	No. 5	No. 15 Georgetown	W 2–0	5–0–0	Klöckner Stadium; Charlottesville, VA
September 8, 2019*; 12:00 p.m., ACCNX	No. 5	Minnesota	W 2–0	6–0–0	Klöckner Stadium (1,510); Charlottesville, VA
September 12, 2019*; 7:00 p.m., ACCNX	No. 4	William & Mary	W 8–1	7–0–0	Klöckner Stadium (1,234); Charlottesville, VA
September 15, 2019*; 1:00 p.m., BTN Plus	No. 4	at No. 8 Penn State	W 2–1	8–0–0	Jeffrey Field (1,039); State College, PA
ACC Regular Season
September 20, 2019; 7:00 p.m., ACCNX	No. 1	at Wake Forest	T 1–1 ^{2OT}	8–0–1 (0–0–1)	Spry Stadium (1,011); Winston-Salem, NC
September 26, 2019; 5:00 p.m., RSN	No. 1	No. 16 Virginia Tech	W 2–0	9–0–1 (1–0–1)	Klöckner Stadium (2,415); Charlottesville, VA
September 29, 2019; 2:00 p.m., ACCN	No. 1	No. 10 Duke	T 0–0 ^{2OT}	9–0–2 (1–0–2)	Klöckner Stadium (2,048); Charlottesville, VA
October 4, 2019; 8:00 p.m., ACCNX	No. 1	at Miami (FL)	W 3–0	10–0–2 (2–0–2)	Cobb Stadium (700); Coral Gables, FL
October 10, 2019; 7:00 p.m., RSN	No. 1	at NC State	T 0–0 ^{2OT}	10–0–3 (2–0–3)	Dail Soccer Field (674); Raleigh, NC
October 13, 2019; 1:00 p.m., ACCN	No. 1	at No. 5 Florida State	W 1–0 ^{2OT}	11–0–3 (3–0–3)	Seminole Soccer Complex; Tallahassee, FL
October 20, 2019; 2:00 p.m., ACCN	No. 1	Notre Dame	W 3–0	12–0–3 (4–0–3)	Klöckner Stadium (1,500); Charlottesville, VA
October 24, 2019; 7:00 p.m., ACCNX	No. 1	No. 12 Louisville	W 3–0	13–0–3 (5–0–3)	Klöckner Stadium (1,968); Charlottesville, VA
October 27, 2019; 1:00 p.m., ACCNX	No. 1	Boston College	W 6–1	14–0–3 (6–0–3)	Klöckner Stadium (1,804); Charlottesville, VA
October 31, 2019; 7:00 p.m., ACCNX	No. 1	at Syracuse	Canceled	14–0–3 (6–0–3)	SU Soccer Stadium; Syracuse, NY
ACC Tournament
November 3, 2019; 5:00 p.m., ACCN	(3) No. 1	(6) No. 9 Duke; Quarterfinals	W 1–0	15–0–3	Klöckner Stadium; Charlottesville, VA
November 8, 2019; 2:30 p.m., ACCN	(3) No. 1	(2) No. 5 Florida State; Semifinals	W 2–1 ^{OT}	16–0–3	Sahlen's Stadium (1,875); Cary, NC
November 10, 2019; 12:00 p.m., ESPNU	(3) No. 1	(1) No. 3 North Carolina; Final	L 1–2 ^{2OT}	16–1–3	Sahlen's Stadium (2,492); Cary, NC
NCAA Tournament
November 16, 2019; 7:00 p.m., ACCNX	(1) No. 3	Radford; First Round	W 3–0	17–1–3	Klöckner Stadium (894); Charlottesville, VA
November __, 2019; 7:00 p.m., ACCNX	(1) No. 3	Washington State; Second Round	L 2–3	17–2–3	Klöckner Stadium (960); Charlottesville, VA
*Non-conference game. ^{#}Rankings from United Soccer Coaches. (#) Tournament seedings in parentheses.

== 2020 NWSL College Draft ==
Player	Team	Round	Pick #	Position
Courtney Petersen	Orlando Pride	1	7	DF
Phoebe McClernon	Orlando Pride	2	14	DF
Zoe Morse	Chicago Red Stars	3	19	MF

== Rankings ==
Ranking movement Legend: ██ Improvement in ranking. ██ Decrease in ranking. ██ Not ranked the previous week. RV=Others receiving votes.
Poll	Pre	Wk 1	Wk 2	Wk 3	Wk 4	Wk 5	Wk 6	Wk 7	Wk 8	Wk 9	Wk 10	Wk 11	Wk 12	Wk 13	Wk 14	Wk 15	Wk 16	Final
United Soccer	9	6	5	4	1 (21)	1 (28)	1 (22)	1 (22)	1 (19)	1 (24)	1 (26)	1 (27)	3	None Released				9
TopDrawer Soccer	5	5	5	4	3	1	1	1	1	1	1	1	1	3	3	9	9	9
