= 2019 Pittsburgh Panthers women's soccer team =

American college soccer season

2019 Pittsburgh Panthers women's soccer
- Conference: Atlantic Coast Conference
- Record: 5–10–3 (2–6–2 ACC)
- Head coach: Randy Waldrum (2nd season)
- Assistant coaches: Ben Waldrum (2nd season); Dustin Stein (2nd season)
- Home stadium: Ambrose Urbanic Field

2019 ACC women's soccer standings
	Conf.						Overall
Team	W		L		T	PCT	W		L		T	PCT
No. 2 North Carolina ‍†‍‡‍^{y}	9	–	0	–	1	.950	24	–	1	–	2	.926
No. 7 Florida State ‍‍‍^{y}	8	–	2	–	0	.800	18	–	6	–	0	.750
No. 9 Virginia ‍‍‍^{y}	6	–	0	–	3	.833	17	–	2	–	3	.841
No. 25 Louisville ‍‍‍^{y}	5	–	3	–	2	.600	13	–	5	–	2	.700
No. 17 NC State ‍‍‍^{y}	4	–	2	–	4	.600	12	–	7	–	4	.609
No. 18 Duke ‍‍‍^{y}	3	–	1	–	6	.600	9	–	4	–	7	.625
Clemson ‍‍‍^{y}	5	–	5	–	0	.500	11	–	7	–	2	.600
Notre Dame ‍‍‍^{y}	4	–	4	–	2	.500	11	–	8	–	2	.571
Virginia Tech ‍‍‍^{y}	4	–	4	–	2	.500	12	–	5	–	2	.684
Pittsburgh ‍‍‍	2	–	6	–	2	.300	5	–	10	–	3	.361
Miami ‍‍‍	2	–	7	–	1	.250	5	–	9	–	2	.375
Wake Forest ‍‍‍	1	–	6	–	3	.250	6	–	8	–	4	.444
Syracuse ‍‍‍	1	–	7	–	1	.167	3	–	11	–	2	.250
Boston College ‍‍‍	1	–	8	–	1	.150	8	–	8	–	2	.500
† – Conference champion ‡ – 2019 ACC Tournament champion y – Invited to the NCAA Tournament; As of December 10, 2019; Rankings from United Soccer Coaches Poll; Source: The ACC

The 2019 Pittsburgh Panthers women's soccer team represented University of Pittsburgh during the 2019 NCAA Division I women's soccer season. The Panthers are led by head coach Randy Waldrum, in his second season. They play home games at Ambrose Urbanic Field. This is the team's 24th season playing organized men's college soccer and their 7th playing in the Atlantic Coast Conference.

The Panthers finished the season 5–10–3 overall, and 2–6–2 in ACC play to finish in tenth place. They did not qualify for the ACC Tournament and were not invited to the NCAA Tournament.

== Squad ==
=== Roster ===
Updated July 23, 2020 Note: Flags indicate national team as defined under FIFA eligibility rules; some limited exceptions apply. Players may hold more than one non-FIFA nationality.

No.	Pos.	Nation	Player
0	GK	USA	Kathernie Robinson
1	GK	ESP	Amaia Peña
2	FW	USA	Danielle Maggio
3	MF	USA	Mackenzie Edwards
4	MF	ENG	Hollie Olding
6	FW	USA	Madison Clayton
7	MF	USA	Juliana Vázquez
8	FW	ISL	Margret Arnadottir
9	FW	USA	Amanda West
10	DF	USA	Cheyenne Hudson
11	MF	ISL	Stefania Tryggvadottir
12	MF	CAN	Anna Bout
14	FW	USA	Sarah Sinnott
16	MF	USA	Maddie Root
17	DF	MEX	Athalie Palomo
18	FW	USA	Rachel Rasins

No.	Pos.	Nation	Player
19	DF	USA	Kate McKay
20	MF	GER	Vildan Kardeşler
21	FW	USA	Marti Floyd
22	MF	USA	Krystyna Rytel
23	MF	USA	Dixon Veltri
24	FW	USA	Sydney Marasco
25	GK	USA	Caitlyn Lazzarini
26	MF	CAN	Bex Bartosh
27	DF	USA	Aideen O'Donoghue
28	MF	USA	Abby Wert
29	FW	ESP	Celia López
30	MF	USA	Marisa Tava
31	FW	USA	Ava Hanna
33	GK	USA	Gabriella Neibart
77	FW	USA	Anna Rico

=== Team management ===
Position	Staff
Head coach	Randy Waldrum
Associate head coach	Ben Waldrum
Assistant Coach	Dustin Stein
Volunteer Assistant Coach	Riley Butler

== Schedule ==
Date Time, TV	Rank^{#}	Opponent^{#}	Result	Record	Site (Attendance) City, State
Exhibition
August 15*		Delaware		– (–)	Ambrose Urbanic Field; Pittsburgh, PA
August 18*		at Kent State		– (–)	Dix Stadium; Kent, OH
Non-conference regular season
August 23*		Loyola Marymount	W 5–4	1–0–0	Ambrose Urbanic Field (640); Pittsburgh, PA
August 25*		at Bucknell	W 1–0 ^{2OT}	2–0–0	Emmitt Field at Holmes Stadium; Lewisburg, PA
August 30*		at Dartmouth	L 1–2	2–1–0	Burnham Field; Hanover, NH
September 1*		at UMass	L 1–2	2–2–0	Rudd Field (225); Amherst, MA
September 6*		Rhode Island	T 1–1 ^{2OT}	2–2–1	Ambrose Urbanic Field (521); Pittsburgh, PA
September 8*		Saint Joseph's	W 2–0	3–2–1	Ambrose Urbanic Field (412); Pittsburgh, PA
September 12*		VCU	L 0–1	3–3–1	Ambrose Urbanic Field (268); Pittsburgh, PA
September 15*		at Liberty	L 0–1	3–4–1	Liberty Soccer Stadium; Lynchburg, VA
ACC regular season
September 20; 7:00 p.m.		Syracuse	T 1–1 ^{2OT}	3–4–2 (0–0–1)	Ambrose Urbanic Field (532); Pittsburgh, PA
September 26; 7:00 p.m.		at Notre Dame	L 0–4	3–5–2 (0–1–1)	Alumni Stadium (484); Notre Dame, IN
September 29; 1:00 p.m.		at Miami (FL)	T 3–3 ^{2OT}	3–5–3 (0–1–2)	Cobb Stadium (550); Coral Gables, FL
October 5; 1:00 p.m.		at No. 6 Florida State	L 0–1	3–6–3 (0–2–2)	Seminole Soccer Complex (478); Tallahassee, FL
October 10; 7:00 p.m.		Boston College	W 2–1 ^{OT}	4–6–3 (1–2–2)	Ambrose Urbanic Field (294); Pittsburgh, PA
October 13; 1:00 p.m.		No. 3 North Carolina	L 1–3	4–7–3 (1–3–2)	Ambrose Urbanic Field (490); Pittsburgh, PA
October 19; 1:00 p.m.		NC State	W 2–1	5–7–3 (2–3–2)	Ambrose Urbanic Field (431); Pittsburgh, PA
October 24; 7:00 p.m.		at Wake Forest	L 2–3 ^{2OT}	5–8–3 (2–4–2)	Spry Stadium (760); Winston-Salem, NC
October 27; 1:00 p.m.		at No. 17 Clemson	L 2–3 ^{OT}	5–9–3 (2–5–2)	Riggs Field (912); Clemson, SC
October 31; 7:00 p.m.		Virginia Tech	L 0–1	5–10–3 (2–6–2)	Ambrose Urbanic Field (182); Pittsburgh, PA
*Non-conference game. ^{#}Rankings from United Soccer Coaches. (#) Tournament seedings in parentheses.

== Rankings ==
Ranking movement Legend: ██ Improvement in ranking. ██ Decrease in ranking. ██ Not ranked the previous week. RV=Others receiving votes.
Poll	Pre	Wk 1	Wk 2	Wk 3	Wk 4	Wk 5	Wk 6	Wk 7	Wk 8	Wk 9	Wk 10	Wk 11	Wk 12	Wk 13	Wk 14	Wk 15	Wk 16	Final
United Soccer														None Released				
TopDrawer Soccer																		
