= 2019 Louisville Cardinals women's soccer team =

2019 Louisville Cardinals women's soccer

NCAA Tournament, Second Round
- Conference: Atlantic Coast Conference
- U. Soc. Coaches poll: No. 25
- Record: 13–5–2 (5–3–2 ACC)
- Head coach: Karen Ferguson-Dayes (20th season)
- Assistant coaches: Andy Stoots (4th season); Hunter Norton (4th season); Tim Nowak (1st season)
- Home stadium: Lynn Stadium

2019 ACC women's soccer standings
	Conf.						Overall
Team	W		L		T	PCT	W		L		T	PCT
No. 2 North Carolina ‍†‍‡‍^{y}	9	–	0	–	1	.950	24	–	1	–	2	.926
No. 7 Florida State ‍‍‍^{y}	8	–	2	–	0	.800	18	–	6	–	0	.750
No. 9 Virginia ‍‍‍^{y}	6	–	0	–	3	.833	17	–	2	–	3	.841
No. 25 Louisville ‍‍‍^{y}	5	–	3	–	2	.600	13	–	5	–	2	.700
No. 17 NC State ‍‍‍^{y}	4	–	2	–	4	.600	12	–	7	–	4	.609
No. 18 Duke ‍‍‍^{y}	3	–	1	–	6	.600	9	–	4	–	7	.625
Clemson ‍‍‍^{y}	5	–	5	–	0	.500	11	–	7	–	2	.600
Notre Dame ‍‍‍^{y}	4	–	4	–	2	.500	11	–	8	–	2	.571
Virginia Tech ‍‍‍^{y}	4	–	4	–	2	.500	12	–	5	–	2	.684
Pittsburgh ‍‍‍	2	–	6	–	2	.300	5	–	10	–	3	.361
Miami ‍‍‍	2	–	7	–	1	.250	5	–	9	–	2	.375
Wake Forest ‍‍‍	1	–	6	–	3	.250	6	–	8	–	4	.444
Syracuse ‍‍‍	1	–	7	–	1	.167	3	–	11	–	2	.250
Boston College ‍‍‍	1	–	8	–	1	.150	8	–	8	–	2	.500
† – Conference champion ‡ – 2019 ACC Tournament champion y – Invited to the NCAA Tournament; As of December 10, 2019; Rankings from United Soccer Coaches Poll; Source: The ACC

The 2019 Louisville Cardinals women's soccer team represented University of Louisville during the 2019 NCAA Division I women's soccer season. The Cardinals were led by head coach Karen Ferguson-Dayes, in her twentieth season. They played home games at Lynn Stadium. This was the team's 35th season playing organized women's college soccer and their 6th playing in the Atlantic Coast Conference.

The Cardinals finished the season 13–5–2, 5–3–2 in ACC play to finish in fourth place. As the fourth seed in the ACC Tournament, they lost to NC State in the Quarterfinals. They received an at-large bid to the NCAA Tournament where they defeated Lipscomb before losing to BYU in the Second Round.

== Squad ==
=== Roster ===
Updated June 30, 2020

Note: Flags indicate national team as defined under FIFA eligibility rules; some limited exceptions apply. Players may hold more than one non-FIFA nationality.

No.	Pos.	Nation	Player
0	GK	USA	Hanna Wise
1	GK	USA	Gabby Kouzelos
2	MF	USA	Sarah Hernandez
3	MF	CAN	Nadege L'Esperance
5	FW	USA	Ravin Alexander
6	MF	USA	Arianna Ferraro
7	DF	USA	Kendra Steele
8	DF	USA	Niamh Nelson
9	MF	USA	Anna Henderson
10	MF	BIH	Emina Ekic
11	MF	USA	Taylor Kerwin
12	FW	USA	Corinne Dente
13	FW	USA	Brooklynn Rivers
14	FW	CAN	Jessica De Filippo
15	MF	USA	Callie McKinney

No.	Pos.	Nation	Player
17	MF	USA	Kiana Klein
18	GK	USA	Lana Batson
19	MF	USA	Maisie Whitsett
20	FW	USA	Emily Knepler
21	FW	USA	Morgan Everett
22	MF	USA	Jolene Ballard
23	FW	USA	Allison Whitfield
24	FW	USA	Delaney Snyder
26	FW	USA	Cassie Amshoff
27	MF	USA	Kiley Polk
30	FW	USA	Amari Hopkins
55	GK	USA	Mikayla Miller
—	MF	CAN	Sarah Beola
—	DF	USA	Bailey Florek
—	FW	USA	Sanela Hodzic

=== Team management ===
Position	Staff
Head coach	Karen Ferguson-Dayes
Assistant Coach	Andy Stoots
Assistant Coach	Hunter Norton
Assistant Coach	Tim Nowak
Performance Analyst	Declan Doherty
Director of Operations	Jing Hughley

== Schedule ==
Date Time, TV	Rank^{#}	Opponent^{#}	Result	Record	Site (Attendance) City, State
Exhibition
August 17, 2019*; 7:30 p.m.		Butler		– (–)	Lynn Stadium; Louisville, KY
Non-conference regular season
August 22, 2019*; 7:00 p.m.		at Ohio State	W 2–1	1–0–0	Jesse Owens Stadium (408); Columbus, OH
August 25, 2019*; 7:30 p.m., ACCNX		Morehead State	W 3–0	2–0–0	Lynn Stadium (843); Louisville, KY
August 29, 2019*; 7:30 p.m., ACCNX		Saint Louis	W 1–0	3–0–0	Lynn Stadium (787); Louisville, KY
September 1, 2019*; 7:30 p.m., ACCNX		Eastern Michigan	W 5–0	4–0–0	Lynn Stadium (838); Louisville, KY
September 5, 2019*; 7:30 p.m., ACCNX		Indiana	W 1–0	5–0–0	Lynn Stadium (696); Louisville, KY
September 12, 2019*; 7:30 p.m., ACCNX		Dayton	W 5–2	6–0–0	Lynn Stadium (680); Louisville, KY
September 15, 2019*; 6:00 p.m., ACCNX		No. 9 Vanderbilt	W 1–0 ^{OT}	7–0–0	Lynn Stadium (969); Louisville, KY
ACC Regular Season
September 21, 2019; 7:30 p.m., ACCNX	No. 20	No. 4 North Carolina	L 0–3	7–1–0 (0–1–0)	Lynn Stadium (1,536); Louisville, KY
September 26, 2019; 6:00 p.m., ACCNX	No. 22	at Syracuse	W 3–0	8–1–0 (1–1–0)	SU Soccer Stadium (172); Syracuse, NY
September 29, 2019; 12:00 p.m., ACCNX	No. 22	at Boston College	W 2–1	9–1–0 (2–1–0)	Newton Campus Soccer Field (426); Newton, MA
October 3, 2019; 7:00 p.m., ACCN	No. 19	Wake Forest	W 2–1	10–1–0 (3–1–0)	Lynn Stadium (843); Louisville, KY
October 10, 2019; 5:00 p.m., FS Go	No. 16	No. 9 Clemson	W 1–0	11–1–0 (4–1–0)	Lynn Stadium (652); Louisville, KY
October 13, 2019; 1:00 p.m., ACCNX	No. 16	at Notre Dame	T 0–0 ^{2OT}	11–1–1 (4–1–1)	Alumni Stadium (682); Notre Dame, IN
October 18, 2019; 5:00 p.m., ACCNX	No. 14	No. 9 Duke	T 1–1 ^{2OT}	11–1–2 (4–1–2)	Lynn Stadium (2,643); Louisville, KY
October 24, 2019; 7:00 p.m., ACCNX	No. 12	at No. 1 Virginia	L 0–3	11–2–2 (4–2–2)	Klöckner Stadium (1,968); Charlottesville, VA
October 27, 2019; 12:00 p.m., ACCNX	No. 12	at Miami (FL)	W 1–0	12–2–2 (5–2–2)	Cobb Stadium (500); Coral Gables, FL
October 31, 2019; 5:00 p.m., ACCNX	No. 14	NC State	L 0–1	12–3–2 (5–3–2)	Lynn Stadium (615); Louisville, KY
ACC Tournament
November 3, 2019; 3:00 p.m., ACCN	(4) No. 14	(5) NC State; Quarterfinals	L 1–2 ^{OT}	12–4–2	Lynn Stadium (307); Louisville, KY
NCAA Tournament
November 15, 2019; 6:00 p.m., ACCNX	No. 23	Lipscomb; First Round	W 1–0	13–4–2	Lynn Stadium (508); Louisville, KY
November 21, 2019; 8:00 p.m.	No. 23	(2) No. 4 BYU; Second Round	L 0–4	13–5–2	South Field (2,476); Provo, UT
*Non-conference game. ^{#}Rankings from United Soccer Coaches. (#) Tournament seedings in parentheses.

== Rankings ==
Ranking movement Legend: ██ Improvement in ranking. ██ Decrease in ranking. ██ Not ranked the previous week. RV=Others receiving votes.
Poll	Pre	Wk 1	Wk 2	Wk 3	Wk 4	Wk 5	Wk 6	Wk 7	Wk 8	Wk 9	Wk 10	Wk 11	Wk 12	Wk 13	Wk 14	Wk 15	Wk 16	Final
United Soccer	RV	RV	RV	RV	20	22	19	16	14	12	14	22	23	None Released				25
TopDrawer Soccer						25	RV	16	10	8	9	15						
