= 2019 North Carolina Tar Heels women's soccer team =

American college soccer season

2019 North Carolina Tar Heels women's soccer

ACC Regular Season ACC Tournament

NCAA Tournament, Runners-Up
- Conference: Atlantic Coast Conference
- U. Soc. Coaches poll: No. 2
- TopDrawerSoccer.com: No. 2
- Record: 24–2–1 (9–0–1 ACC)
- Head coach: Anson Dorrance (43rd season)
- Assistant coaches: Chris Ducar (24th season); Damon Nahas (4th season); Heather O'Reilly (1st season)
- Home stadium: Fetzer Field

2019 ACC women's soccer standings
	Conf.						Overall
Team	W		L		T	PCT	W		L		T	PCT
No. 2 North Carolina ‍†‍‡‍^{y}	9	–	0	–	1	.950	24	–	1	–	2	.926
No. 7 Florida State ‍‍‍^{y}	8	–	2	–	0	.800	18	–	6	–	0	.750
No. 9 Virginia ‍‍‍^{y}	6	–	0	–	3	.833	17	–	2	–	3	.841
No. 25 Louisville ‍‍‍^{y}	5	–	3	–	2	.600	13	–	5	–	2	.700
No. 17 NC State ‍‍‍^{y}	4	–	2	–	4	.600	12	–	7	–	4	.609
No. 18 Duke ‍‍‍^{y}	3	–	1	–	6	.600	9	–	4	–	7	.625
Clemson ‍‍‍^{y}	5	–	5	–	0	.500	11	–	7	–	2	.600
Notre Dame ‍‍‍^{y}	4	–	4	–	2	.500	11	–	8	–	2	.571
Virginia Tech ‍‍‍^{y}	4	–	4	–	2	.500	12	–	5	–	2	.684
Pittsburgh ‍‍‍	2	–	6	–	2	.300	5	–	10	–	3	.361
Miami ‍‍‍	2	–	7	–	1	.250	5	–	9	–	2	.375
Wake Forest ‍‍‍	1	–	6	–	3	.250	6	–	8	–	4	.444
Syracuse ‍‍‍	1	–	7	–	1	.167	3	–	11	–	2	.250
Boston College ‍‍‍	1	–	8	–	1	.150	8	–	8	–	2	.500
† – Conference champion ‡ – 2019 ACC Tournament champion y – Invited to the NCAA Tournament; As of December 10, 2019; Rankings from United Soccer Coaches Poll; Source: The ACC

The 2019 North Carolina Tar Heels women's soccer team represented the University of North Carolina at Chapel Hill during the 2019 NCAA Division I women's soccer season. It was the 43rd season of the university fielding a program. The Tar Heels were led by 43rd year head coach Anson Dorrance.

The Tar Heels finished the season 24–2–1, 8–0–1 in ACC play to finish in first place. As the first seed in the ACC Tournament, they defeated Notre Dame, NC State, and Virginia in order to be crowned champions. They received an automatic bid to the NCAA Tournament where they defeated Belmont, Colorado, Michigan, USC, and Washington State before losing to Stanford in the Finals.

== Squad ==
=== Roster ===
Updated June 15, 2020

Note: Flags indicate national team as defined under FIFA eligibility rules; some limited exceptions apply. Players may hold more than one non-FIFA nationality.

No.	Pos.	Nation	Player
0	GK	USA	Claudia Dickey
1	FW	USA	Madison Schultz
3	FW	USA	Ru Mucherera
4	FW	USA	Bridgette Andrzejewski
5	MF	USA	Mary Elliot McCabe
6	FW	USA	Taylor Otto
7	DF	USA	Julia Dorsey
8	MF	USA	Brianna Pinto
9	MF	USA	Rachel Dorwart
10	MF	USA	Rachel Jones
11	MF	USA	Emily Fox
12	FW	USA	Alexis Strickland
13	FW	USA	Isabel Cox
14	MF	USA	Morgan Goff
15	FW	USA	Zoe Redei
16	FW	USA	Aleigh Gambone

No.	Pos.	Nation	Player
17	GK	USA	Marz Josephson
18	MF	USA	Natalie Chandler
19	FW	ENG	Alessia Russo
20	MF	USA	Libby Moore
21	MF	USA	Miah Araba
22	DF	USA	Tori Hansen
23	DF	ENG	Lotte Wubben-Moy
25	DF	USA	Maycee Bell
26	FW	USA	Hallie Klanke
27	DF	ENG	Lois Joel
28	MF	USA	Maggie Pierce
30	DF	USA	Brooke Bingham
45	MF	USA	Cameron Keating
52	FW	USA	Izzy Brown
99	MF	USA	Laura Sparling

=== Team management ===
Position	Staff
Athletic Director	Bubba Cunningham
Head coach	Anson Dorrance
Assistant Coach	Chris Ducar
Assistant Coach	Damon Nahas
Assistant Coach	Heather O'Reilly
Director of Operations	Tom Sander

== Schedule ==
Date Time, TV	Rank^{#}	Opponent^{#}	Result	Record	Site (Attendance) City, State
Non-conference regular season
August 22, 2019*; 6:30 p.m.	No. 2	Indiana; Carolina Nike Classic	W 3–0	1–0–0	Dorrance Field (1,481); Chapel Hill, NC
August 25, 2019*; 6:00 p.m.	No. 2	No. 8 Duke; Carolina Nike Classic	W 2–0	2–0–0	Dorrance Field (4,215); Chapel Hill, NC
August 28, 2019*; 10:00 p.m.	No. 2	at Washington; Husky Invitational	W 3–2	3–0–0	Husky Soccer Stadium (1,811); Seattle, WA
September 1, 2019*; 2:30 p.m.	No. 2	vs. Portland; Husky Invitational	W 4–0	4–0–0	Husky Soccer Stadium (1,339); Seattle, WA
September 5, 2019*; 3:30 p.m.	No. 1	vs. LSU; Duke Nike Classic	W 1–0	5–0–0	Koskinen Stadium (284); Durham, NC
September 8, 2019*; 11:00 a.m.	No. 1	vs. UNLV; Duke Nike Classic	W 8–0	6–0–0	Koskinen Stadium (621); Durham, NC
September 12, 2019*; 7:00 p.m.	No. 1	Wake Forest	W 4–0	7–0–0	Dorrance Field (1,525); Chapel Hill, NC
September 15, 2019*; 1:00 p.m.	No. 1	at Arkansas	L 0–2	7–1–0	Razorback Field (1,058); Fayetteville, AR
ACC regular season
September 21, 2019; 7:30 p.m.	No. 4	at No. 20 Louisville	W 3–0	8–1–0 (1–0–0)	Lynn Stadium (1,536); Louisville, KY
September 26, 2019; 7:30 p.m.	No. 4	NC State	W 1–0	9–1–0 (2–0–0)	Dorrance Field (1,536); Chapel Hill, NC
September 29, 2019; 1:00 p.m.	No. 4	Notre Dame	W 3–0	10–1–0 (3–0–0)	Dorrance Field (2,316); Chapel Hill, NC
October 5, 2019; 5:00 p.m.	No. 3	No. 8 Clemson	W 1–0	11–1–0 (4–0–0)	Dorrance Field (2,783); Chapel Hill, NC
October 10, 2019; 7:00 p.m.	No. 3	at No. 11 Duke	T 0–0 ^{2OT}	11–1–1 (4–0–1)	Koskinen Stadium (3,176); Durham, NC
October 13, 2019; 1:00 p.m.	No. 3	at Pittsburgh	W 3–1	12–1–1 (5–0–1)	Ambrose Urbanic Field (490); Pittsburgh, PA
October 17, 2019; 7:00 p.m.	No. 3	Boston College	W 3–0	13–1–1 (6–0–1)	Newton Soccer Complex (1,027); Chestnut Hill, MA
October 24, 2019; 7:00 p.m.	No. 3	No. 5 Florida State	W 2–0	14–1–1 (7–0–1)	Dorrance Field (3,021); Chapel Hill, NC
October 27, 2019; 3:00 p.m.	No. 3	No. 25 Virginia Tech	W 2–0	15–1–1 (8–0–1)	Dorrance Field (2,113); Chapel Hill, NC
October 31, 2019; 7:30 p.m.	No. 3	at Miami (FL)	W 3–2	16–1–1 (9–0–1)	Cobb Stadium (750); Coral Gables, FL
ACC tournament
November 3, 2019; 7:00 p.m.	(1) No. 3	(8) Notre Dame; Quarterfinals	W 3–0	17–1–1	Dorrance Field (875); Chapel Hill, NC
November 8, 2019; 5:00 p.m.	(1) No. 3	vs. (5) NC State; Semifinal	W 3–0	18–1–1	Sahlen's Stadium (1,875); Cary, NC
November 10, 2019; 12:00 p.m.	(1) No. 3	vs. (3) No. 1 Virginia; Final	W 2–1 ^{2OT}	19–1–1	Sahlen's Stadium (2,492); Cary, NC
NCAA tournament
November 16, 2019; 6:00 p.m.	(1) No. 2	Belmont; First Round	W 5–0	20–1–1	Dorrance Field (1,076); Chapel Hill, NC
November 22, 2019; 6:00 p.m.	(1) No. 2	Colorado; Second Round	W 1–0	21–1–1	Dorrance Field (4,235); Chapel Hill, NC
November 24, 2019; 1:00 p.m.	(1) No. 2	No. 19 Michigan; Round of 16	W 4–0	22–1–1	Dorrance Field (3,672); Chapel Hill, NC
November 29, 2019; 6:00 p.m.	(1) No. 2	(2) No. 9 USC; Quarterfinal	W 3–2	23–1–1	Dorrance Field (2,655); Chapel Hill, NC
December 6, 2019; 7:00 p.m.	(1) No. 2	Washington State; Semifinal	W 2–1	24–1–1	Avaya Stadium (7,699); San Diego, CA
December 8, 2019; 8:30 p.m.	(1) No. 2	(1) No. 1 Stanford; Final	T 0–0 (4–5 PKs) ^{2OT}	24–1–2	Avaya Stadium (9,591); San Diego, CA
*Non-conference game. ^{#}Rankings from United Soccer Coaches. (#) Tournament seedings in parentheses.

== 2020 NWSL College Draft ==
Player	Team	Round	Pick #	Position
Bridgette Andrzejewski	Houston Dash	2	18	F

== Rankings ==
Ranking movement Legend: ██ Improvement in ranking. ██ Decrease in ranking. ██ Not ranked the previous week. RV=Others receiving votes.
Poll	Pre	Wk 1	Wk 2	Wk 3	Wk 4	Wk 5	Wk 6	Wk 7	Wk 8	Wk 9	Wk 10	Wk 11	Wk 12	Wk 13	Wk 14	Wk 15	Wk 16	Final
United Soccer	2	2	1 (24)	1 (29)	4	4	3 (2)	3 (3)	3 (1)	3	3	3	2 (8)	None Released				2 (1)
TopDrawer Soccer	3	3	3	2	1	4	3	2	2	2	2	2	2	1	1	1	1	2
