= 2019 Virginia Tech Hokies women's soccer team =

American college soccer season

2019 Virginia Tech Hokies women's soccer

NCAA Tournament, First Round
- Conference: Atlantic Coast Conference
- Record: 12–5–2 (4–4–2 ACC)
- Head coach: Charles Adair (9th season)
- Assistant coaches: Drew Kopp (8th season); Matt Gwilliam (5th season)
- Home stadium: Thompson Field

2019 ACC women's soccer standings
	Conf.						Overall
Team	W		L		T	PCT	W		L		T	PCT
No. 2 North Carolina ‍†‍‡‍^{y}	9	–	0	–	1	.950	24	–	1	–	2	.926
No. 7 Florida State ‍‍‍^{y}	8	–	2	–	0	.800	18	–	6	–	0	.750
No. 9 Virginia ‍‍‍^{y}	6	–	0	–	3	.833	17	–	2	–	3	.841
No. 25 Louisville ‍‍‍^{y}	5	–	3	–	2	.600	13	–	5	–	2	.700
No. 17 NC State ‍‍‍^{y}	4	–	2	–	4	.600	12	–	7	–	4	.609
No. 18 Duke ‍‍‍^{y}	3	–	1	–	6	.600	9	–	4	–	7	.625
Clemson ‍‍‍^{y}	5	–	5	–	0	.500	11	–	7	–	2	.600
Notre Dame ‍‍‍^{y}	4	–	4	–	2	.500	11	–	8	–	2	.571
Virginia Tech ‍‍‍^{y}	4	–	4	–	2	.500	12	–	5	–	2	.684
Pittsburgh ‍‍‍	2	–	6	–	2	.300	5	–	10	–	3	.361
Miami ‍‍‍	2	–	7	–	1	.250	5	–	9	–	2	.375
Wake Forest ‍‍‍	1	–	6	–	3	.250	6	–	8	–	4	.444
Syracuse ‍‍‍	1	–	7	–	1	.167	3	–	11	–	2	.250
Boston College ‍‍‍	1	–	8	–	1	.150	8	–	8	–	2	.500
† – Conference champion ‡ – 2019 ACC Tournament champion y – Invited to the NCAA Tournament; As of December 10, 2019; Rankings from United Soccer Coaches Poll; Source: The ACC

The 2019 Virginia Tech Hokies women's soccer team represented Virginia Tech during the 2019 NCAA Division I women's soccer season. It was the 27th season of the university fielding a program and 16th competing in the Atlantic Coast Conference. The Hokies were led by 9th year head coach Charles Adair and played their home games at Thompson Field.

The Hokies finished the season 12–5–2, 4–4–2 in ACC play to finish in a tie for eight place. They were not invited to the ACC Tournament. They received an automatic bid to the NCAA Tournament where they lost to Xavier in the First Round.

== Squad ==
=== Roster ===
Updated: July 8, 2020

Note: Flags indicate national team as defined under FIFA eligibility rules; some limited exceptions apply. Players may hold more than one non-FIFA nationality.

No.	Pos.	Nation	Player
0	GK	USA	Dare Burnett
00	GK	USA	Alice Hamel
1	GK	USA	Mandy McGlynn
2	MF	USA	Holly Rose Weber
3	DF	USA	Jaylyn Thompson
4	MF	USA	Emily Gray
5	MF	USA	Cassidy Brown
6	DF	USA	Caroline Cipolla
7	MF	USA	Kiersten Hening
8	DF	USA	Kelsey Irwin
9	FW	USA	Emma Steigerwald
10	FW	UKR	Nicole Kozlova
11	MF	USA	Grace Sklopan
12	FW	USA	Mikayla Mance
13	FW	USA	Karlie Johnson

No.	Pos.	Nation	Player
14	MF	USA	Alexa Anderson
15	FW	USA	Allyson Brown
16	MF	USA	Jordan Hemmen
17	DF	USA	Olivia Odle
18	MF	USA	Kara Henderson
19	MF	USA	Lilly Weber
20	DF	USA	Caroline O'Connor
22	FW	USA	Bridget Patch
24	FW	USA	Emmalee McCarter
25	FW	USA	Calista Heister
26	FW	USA	Molly Feighan
27	DF	USA	Sydney Ash
28	MF	USA	Mak Graham
30	GK	USA	S.A. Phillips

== Team management ==
Position	Staff
Head coach	Charles Adair
Associate Head Coach	Drew Kopp
Assistant Coach	Matt Gwilliam

== Schedule ==
Date Time, TV	Rank^{#}	Opponent^{#}	Result	Record	Site (Attendance) City, State
Exhibition
August 10*; 5:00 p.m.	No. 25	Marshall	W 3–0	–	Thompson Field; Blacksburg, VA
August 17*; 1:00 p.m.	No. 25	at George Mason	W 2–1	–	George Mason Stadium; Fairfax, VA
Non-conference regular season
August 22*; 7:00 p.m.	No. 25	Liberty	W 3–0	1–0–0	Thompson Field (1,667); Blacksburg, VA
August 25*; 1:00 p.m.	No. 25	Cincinnati	W 2–0	2–0–0	Thompson Field (863); Blacksburg, VA
August 30*; 7:00 p.m.		at Georgia; Bulldog Classic	W 2–0	3–0–0	Turner Soccer Complex (1,687); Athens, GA
September 1*; 1:00 p.m.		vs. Auburn; Bulldog Classic	W 3–1	4–0–0	Turner Soccer Complex; Athens, GA
September 5*; 7:00 p.m.	No. 23	Alabama	W 2–0	5–0–0	Thompson Field (1,237); Blacksburg, VA
September 8*; 1:00 p.m.	No. 23	Yale	W 2–1	6–0–0	Thompson Field (559); Blacksburg, VA
September 13*; 5:00 p.m.	No. 16	vs. College of Charleston; Battle by the Beach	W 1–0	7–0–0	UNCW Soccer Stadium (437); Wilmington, NC
September 15*; 1:00 p.m.	No. 16	at UNC Wilmington; Battle by the Beach	W 1–0	8–0–0	UNCW Soccer Stadium (501); Wilmington, NC
ACC Regular Season
September 21; 7:00 p.m.	No. 18	Miami (FL)	W 2–0	9–0–0 (1–0–0)	Thompson Field (947); Blacksburg, VA
September 26; 5:00 p.m.	No. 16	at No. 1 Virginia	L 0–2	9–1–0 (1–1–0)	Klöckner Stadium (2,415); Charlottesville, VA
September 29; 1:00 p.m.	No. 16	at No. 9 Clemson	L 1–3	9–2–0 (1–2–0)	Riggs Field (753); Clemson, SC
October 6; 2:00 p.m.	No. 23	No. 10 Duke	T 0–0 ^{2OT}	9–2–1 (1–2–1)	Thompson Field (618); Blacksburg, VA
October 10; 7:00 p.m.	No. 20	No. 5 Florida State	L 2–3 ^{2OT}	9–3–1 (1–3–1)	Thompson Field (1,017); Blacksburg, VA
October 13; 1:00 p.m.	No. 20	at NC State	T 1–1 ^{2OT}	9–3–2 (1–3–2)	Dail Soccer Field (210); Raleigh, NC
October 18; 5:00 p.m.		Wake Forest	W 1–0	10–3–2 (2–3–2)	Thompson Field (619); Blacksburg, VA
October 24; 7:00 p.m.	No. 25	Boston College	W 2–1	11–3–2 (3–3–2)	Thompson Field (522); Blacksburg, VA
October 27; 3:00 p.m.	No. 25	at No. 3 North Carolina	L 0–2	11–4–2 (3–4–2)	Dorrance Field (2,113); Chapel Hill, NC
October 31; 7:00 p.m.		at Pittsburgh	W 1–0	12–4–2 (4–4–2)	Ambrose Urbanic Field (182); Pittsburgh, PA
NCAA tournament
November 15; 5:00 p.m.		No. 24 Xavier; First Round	L 0–1	12–5–2	Thompson Field (633); Blacksburg, VA
*Non-conference game. ^{#}Rankings from United Soccer Coaches. (#) Tournament seedings in parentheses.

== 2020 NWSL College Draft ==
Player	Team	Round	Pick #	Position
Mandy McGlynn	Sky Blue FC	3	20	GK

== Rankings ==
Ranking movement Legend: ██ Improvement in ranking. ██ Decrease in ranking. ██ Not ranked the previous week. RV=Others receiving votes.
Poll	Pre	Wk 1	Wk 2	Wk 3	Wk 4	Wk 5	Wk 6	Wk 7	Wk 8	Wk 9	Wk 10	Wk 11	Wk 12	Wk 13	Wk 14	Wk 15	Wk 16	Final
United Soccer	25	RV	23	16	18	16	23	20	RV	25	RV	RV	RV	None Released				
TopDrawer Soccer	RV	RV	RV	RV	20	16	13	19	18	19	17	21	20	22				
