= 2019 NC State Wolfpack women's soccer team =

American college soccer season

2019 NC State Wolfpack women's soccer

NCAA Tournament, Round of 16
- Conference: Atlantic Coast Conference
- U. Soc. Coaches poll: No. 17
- TopDrawerSoccer.com: No. 24
- Record: 12–7–4 (4–2–4 ACC)
- Head coach: Tim Santoro (8th season)
- Assistant coaches: Glen Tourville (3rd season); Steve McKenna (3rd season)
- Home stadium: Dail Soccer Field

2019 ACC women's soccer standings
	Conf.						Overall
Team	W		L		T	PCT	W		L		T	PCT
No. 2 North Carolina ‍†‍‡‍^{y}	9	–	0	–	1	.950	24	–	1	–	2	.926
No. 7 Florida State ‍‍‍^{y}	8	–	2	–	0	.800	18	–	6	–	0	.750
No. 9 Virginia ‍‍‍^{y}	6	–	0	–	3	.833	17	–	2	–	3	.841
No. 25 Louisville ‍‍‍^{y}	5	–	3	–	2	.600	13	–	5	–	2	.700
No. 17 NC State ‍‍‍^{y}	4	–	2	–	4	.600	12	–	7	–	4	.609
No. 18 Duke ‍‍‍^{y}	3	–	1	–	6	.600	9	–	4	–	7	.625
Clemson ‍‍‍^{y}	5	–	5	–	0	.500	11	–	7	–	2	.600
Notre Dame ‍‍‍^{y}	4	–	4	–	2	.500	11	–	8	–	2	.571
Virginia Tech ‍‍‍^{y}	4	–	4	–	2	.500	12	–	5	–	2	.684
Pittsburgh ‍‍‍	2	–	6	–	2	.300	5	–	10	–	3	.361
Miami ‍‍‍	2	–	7	–	1	.250	5	–	9	–	2	.375
Wake Forest ‍‍‍	1	–	6	–	3	.250	6	–	8	–	4	.444
Syracuse ‍‍‍	1	–	7	–	1	.167	3	–	11	–	2	.250
Boston College ‍‍‍	1	–	8	–	1	.150	8	–	8	–	2	.500
† – Conference champion ‡ – 2019 ACC Tournament champion y – Invited to the NCAA Tournament; As of December 10, 2019; Rankings from United Soccer Coaches Poll; Source: The ACC

The 2019 NC State Wolfpack women's soccer team represented NC State University during the 2019 NCAA Division I women's soccer season. The Wolfpack were led by head coach Tim Santoro, in his eight season. They played home games at Dail Soccer Field. This was the team's 36th season playing organized women's college soccer and their 33rd playing in the Atlantic Coast Conference.

The Wolfpack finished the season 12–7–4, 4–2–4 in ACC play to finish in fifth place. As the fifth seed in the ACC Tournament, they defeated Louisville in the Quarterfinals before falling to eventual champions North Carolina in the Semifinals. They received an at-large bid to the NCAA Tournament where they defeated Navy and Arkansas before losing to BYU in the Round of 16.

== Squad ==
=== Roster ===
Updated July 1, 2020 Note: Flags indicate national team as defined under FIFA eligibility rules; some limited exceptions apply. Players may hold more than one non-FIFA nationality.

No.	Pos.	Nation	Player
0	GK	USA	Eden Millan
1	GK	USA	Jessica Beriln
2	MF	USA	Tziarra King
3	DF	GER	Krissi Schuster
4	FW	USA	Leyah Hall-Robinson
5	DF	USA	Jenna Butler
6	DF	GER	Lulu Guttenberger
7	MF	GER	Ricci Walkling
8	FW	USA	Kia Rankin
9	FW	USA	Maxine Blackwood
10	FW	USA	Courtney Walker
11	MF	USA	Michaella Van Maanen
12	MF	USA	Jaiden Thomas

No.	Pos.	Nation	Player
13	DF	USA	Margot Ridgeway
14	MF	CZE	Toni Starova
15	FW	USA	Jameese Joseph
17	MF	USA	Mikhail Johnson
18	DF	USA	Mackenzie Crittenberger
19	MF	USA	Madison Kline
20	DF	USA	Mia Thillet
21	MF	USA	Paige Griffiths
22	MF	USA	Sandra Geiselhart
23	MF	USA	Anna Toohey
24	MF	USA	Kursten Von Klahr
27	MF	USA	Naomi Powell
28	DF	USA	Hope McQueen

=== Team management ===
Position	Staff
Athletic Director	Boo Corrigan
Head coach	Tim Santoro
Associate Head Coach	Glen Tourville
Assistant Coach	Steve McKenna
Director of Operations	Kim Kern

== Schedule ==
Date Time, TV	Rank^{#}	Opponent^{#}	Result	Record	Site (Attendance) City, State
Exhibition
August 17*	No. 21	College of Charleston	W 4–2	– (–)	Dail Soccer Field; Raleigh, NC
Non-conference regular season
August 22*	No. 21	at No. 15 South Carolina	L 1–2	0–1–0	Stone Stadium (3,774); Columbia, SC
August 25*	No. 21	at No. 7 Georgetown	W 3–1	1–1–0	Shaw Field (811); Washington, D.C.
August 30*	No. 17	at Monmouth	W 1–0	2–1–0	Hesse Field (770); West Long Branch, NJ
September 6*	No. 14	Iowa	L 0–1	2–2–0	Dail Soccer Field (253); Raleigh, NC
September 8*	No. 14	Duquesne	W 3–0	3–2–0	Dail Soccer Field (295); Raleigh, NC
September 12*		at Minnesota	L 0–1	3–3–0	Elizabeth Lyle Robbie Stadium (375); Falcon Heights, MN
September 15*		Furman	W 3–1	4–3–0	Dail Soccer Field (310); Raleigh, NC
September 18*		at East Carolina	W 5–2	5–3–0	Johnson Stadium (808); Greenville, NC
ACC regular season
September 22		at No. 8 Duke	T 1–1 ^{2OT}	5–3–1 (0–0–1)	Koskinen Stadium (622); Durham, NC
September 26		at No. 4 North Carolina	L 0–1	5–4–1 (0–1–1)	Dorrance Field (1,536); Chapel Hill, NC
September 29		at Wake Forest	T 1–1 ^{2OT}	5–4–2 (0–1–2)	Spry Stadium (541); Winston-Salem, NC
October 5; 7:00 p.m.		Boston College	W 2–0	6–4–2 (1–1–2)	Dail Soccer Field (697); Raleigh, NC
October 9		No. 1 Virginia	T 0–0 ^{2OT}	6–4–3 (1–1–3)	Dail Soccer Field (674); Raleigh, NC
October 13		No. 20 Virginia Tech	T 1–1 ^{2OT}	6–4–4 (1–1–4)	Dail Soccer Field (210); Raleigh, NC
October 19		at Pittsburgh	L 1–2	6–5–4 (1–2–4)	Ambrose Urbanic Field (431); Pittsburgh, PA
October 24; 7:00 p.m.		Syracuse	W 3–2 ^{OT}	7–5–4 (2–2–4)	Dail Soccer Field (302); Raleigh, NC
October 27		Notre Dame	W 3–0	8–5–4 (3–2–4)	Dail Soccer Field (305); Raleigh, NC
October 31		at No. 14 Louisville	W 1–0	9–5–4 (4–2–4)	Lynn Stadium (615); Louisville, KY
ACC tournament
November 3; 3:00 p.m.	(5)	at (4) No. 14 Louisville; Quarterfinals	W 2–1 ^{OT}	10–5–4	Lynn Stadium (307); Louisville, KY
November 8; 5:00 p.m.	(5) No. 23	vs. (1) No. 3 North Carolina; Semifinals	L 0–3	10–6–4	Sahlen's Stadium (1,875); Cary, NC
NCAA tournament
November 15; 7:00 p.m.		Navy; First Round	W 3–0	11–6–4	Dail Soccer Field (342); Raleigh, NC
November 21; 5:00 p.m.		vs. (3) No. 8 Arkansas; Second Round	W 2–1	12–6–4	South Field (2,476); Provo, UT
November 23; 8:00 p.m.		(2) No. 4 BYU; Round of 16	L 0–3	12–7–4	South Field (3,629); Provo, UT
*Non-conference game. ^{#}Rankings from United Soccer Coaches. (#) Tournament seedings in parentheses.

== 2020 NWSL College Draft ==
Player	Team	Round	Pick #	Position
Tziarra King	Utah Royals	1	8	FW

== Rankings ==
Ranking movement Legend: ██ Improvement in ranking. ██ Decrease in ranking. ██ Not ranked the previous week. RV=Others receiving votes.
Poll	Pre	Wk 1	Wk 2	Wk 3	Wk 4	Wk 5	Wk 6	Wk 7	Wk 8	Wk 9	Wk 10	Wk 11	Wk 12	Wk 13	Wk 14	Wk 15	Wk 16	Final
United Soccer	21	17	14	RV				RV	RV	RV	RV	23	RV	None Released				17
TopDrawer Soccer	21	21	20	16	23								RV	RV	RV	24	24	24
