= 2019 Notre Dame Fighting Irish women's soccer team =

American college soccer season

2019 Notre Dame Fighting Irish women's soccer

NCAA Tournament, First Round
- Conference: Atlantic Coast Conference
- Record: 11–8–2 (4–4–2 ACC)
- Head coach: Nate Norman (2nd season)
- Assistant coaches: Dawn Siergiej (17th season); Lauren Sinacola (1st season)
- Home stadium: Alumni Stadium

2019 ACC women's soccer standings
	Conf.						Overall
Team	W		L		T	PCT	W		L		T	PCT
No. 2 North Carolina ‍†‍‡‍^{y}	9	–	0	–	1	.950	24	–	1	–	2	.926
No. 7 Florida State ‍‍‍^{y}	8	–	2	–	0	.800	18	–	6	–	0	.750
No. 9 Virginia ‍‍‍^{y}	6	–	0	–	3	.833	17	–	2	–	3	.841
No. 25 Louisville ‍‍‍^{y}	5	–	3	–	2	.600	13	–	5	–	2	.700
No. 17 NC State ‍‍‍^{y}	4	–	2	–	4	.600	12	–	7	–	4	.609
No. 18 Duke ‍‍‍^{y}	3	–	1	–	6	.600	9	–	4	–	7	.625
Clemson ‍‍‍^{y}	5	–	5	–	0	.500	11	–	7	–	2	.600
Notre Dame ‍‍‍^{y}	4	–	4	–	2	.500	11	–	8	–	2	.571
Virginia Tech ‍‍‍^{y}	4	–	4	–	2	.500	12	–	5	–	2	.684
Pittsburgh ‍‍‍	2	–	6	–	2	.300	5	–	10	–	3	.361
Miami ‍‍‍	2	–	7	–	1	.250	5	–	9	–	2	.375
Wake Forest ‍‍‍	1	–	6	–	3	.250	6	–	8	–	4	.444
Syracuse ‍‍‍	1	–	7	–	1	.167	3	–	11	–	2	.250
Boston College ‍‍‍	1	–	8	–	1	.150	8	–	8	–	2	.500
† – Conference champion ‡ – 2019 ACC Tournament champion y – Invited to the NCAA Tournament; As of December 10, 2019; Rankings from United Soccer Coaches Poll; Source: The ACC

The 2019 Notre Dame Fighting Irish women's soccer team represented the University of Notre Dame during the 2019 NCAA Division I women's soccer season. It was the 32nd season of the university fielding a program. The Fighting Irish were led by 2nd year head coach Nate Norman and played their games at Alumni Stadium.

The Fighting Irish finished the season 11–8–2, 4–4–2 in ACC play to finish in a tie for eighth place. As the eight seed in the ACC Tournament, they lost to North Carolina in the Quarterfinals. They received an at-large bid to the NCAA Tournament where they defeated Saint Louis in the first round, before losing to South Carolina in the Second Round.

== Squad ==
=== Roster ===
Updated July 7, 2020

Note: Flags indicate national team as defined under FIFA eligibility rules; some limited exceptions apply. Players may hold more than one non-FIFA nationality.

No.	Pos.	Nation	Player
00	GK	USA	Jaina Eckert
0	GK	USA	Mattie Interian
1	GK	USA	Brooke Littman
2	DF	USA	Jade Gosar
3	MF	USA	Maddie Mercado
4	MF	ESA	Sammi Fisher
5	MF	CAN	Alexis Martel-Lamothe
6	MF	USA	Brooke VanDyck
7	FW	JAM	Kiki Van Zanten
8	DF	USA	Bea Franklin
9	FW	USA	Olivia Wingate
10	MF	USA	Erin Hohnstein
11	DF	USA	Shannon Hendricks
12	MF	USA	Camryn Dyke
13	MF	USA	Nikki Colantuono

No.	Pos.	Nation	Player
14	FW	USA	Eva Hurm
15	FW	USA	Kati Druzina
16	MF	USA	Brianna Martinez
17	FW	USA	Audrey Weiss
18	DF	USA	Chloe Boice
19	DF	USA	Jenna Winebrenner
20	FW	USA	Bailey Cartwright
21	FW	USA	Erin Ospeck
22	MF	USA	Kelly Moss
23	MF	USA	Luisa Delgado
24	MF	USA	Megan McLaughlin
25	DF	USA	Waniya Hudson
26	MF	USA	Kate O'Connor
28	DF	USA	Autumn Smithers
30	MF	USA	Gabrielle Daly

== Team management ==
Position	Staff
Head coach	Nate Norman
Assistant Coach	Dawn Siergiej
Assistant Coach	Lauren Sinacola
Volunteer Assistant Coach	Colby Cunningham

== Schedule ==
Date Time, TV	Rank^{#}	Opponent^{#}	Result	Record	Site City, State
Non-conference regular season
August 22*; 7:00 p.m.		Saint Louis	W 1–0	1–0–0	Alumni Stadium (902); Notre Dame, IN
August 25*; 1:00 p.m.		Northwestern	W 4–0	2–0–0	Alumni Stadium (1,330); Notre Dame, IN
August 29*; 7:00 p.m.		at Western Michigan	W 2–1	3–0–0	WMU Soccer Complex (575); Kalamazoo, MI
September 1*; 1:00 p.m		St. John's	W 4–0	4–0–0	Alumni Stadium; Notre Dame, IN
September 6*; 7:00 p.m.		at Michigan	W 1–0	5–0–0	U-M Soccer Stadium (1,453); Ann Arbor, MI
September 8*; 1:00 p.m.		at Oakland	W 1–0	6–0–0	The Oakland Field (593); Rochester, MI
September 12*; 7:00 p.m.		at No. 7 South Carolina	L 1–2	6–1–0	Stone Stadium (1,778); Columbia, SC
September 15*; 1:00 p.m.		Iowa	L 2–3	6–2–0	Alumni Stadium; Notre Dame, IN
ACC Regular Season
September 20; 5:00 p.m.		at No. 10 Clemson	L 0–1	6–3–0 (0–1–0)	Riggs Field (1,184); Clemson, SC
September 26; 7:00 p.m.		Pittsburgh	W 4–0	7–3–0 (1–1–0)	Alumni Stadium (484); Notre Dame, IN
September 29; 1:00 p.m.		at No. 4 North Carolina	L 0–3	7–4–0 (1–2–0)	Dorrance Field (2,316); Chapel Hill, NC
October 4; 7:00 p.m.		Syracuse	W 3–0	8–4–0 (2–2–0)	Alumni Stadium (848); Notre Dame, IN
October 10; 7:00 p.m.		Miami (FL)	W 3–0	9–4–0 (3–2–0)	Alumni Stadium (507); Notre Dame, IN
October 13; 1:00 p.m.		No. 16 Louisville	T 0–0 ^{2OT}	9–4–1 (3–2–1)	Alumni Stadium (682); Notre Dame, IN
October 20; 2:00 p.m.		at No. 1 Virginia	L 0–3	9–5–1 (3–3–1)	Klöckner Stadium (1,500); Charlottesville, VA
October 24; 7:00 p.m.		at No. 9 Duke	T 1–1 ^{2OT}	9–5–2 (3–3–2)	Koskinen Stadium (541); Durham, NC
October 27; 7:00 p.m.		at NC State	L 0–3	9–6–2 (3–4–2)	Dail Soccer Field (305); Raleigh, NC
October 31; 5:00 p.m.		Wake Forest	W 3–2 ^{2OT}	10–6–2 (4–4–2)	Alumni Stadium (352); Notre Dame, IN
ACC Tournament
November 3; 7:00 p.m.	(8)	(1) No. 3 North Carolina; Quarterfinals	L 0–3	10–7–2	Dorrance Field (875); Chapel Hill, NC
NCAA Tournament
November 17; 1:00 p.m.		Saint Louis; First Round	W 1–0	11–7–2	Alumni Stadium (463); Notre Dame, IN
November 22; 6:00 p.m.		(2) No. 5 South Carolina; Second Round	L 0–1	11–8–2	Stone Stadium (1,301); Columbia, SC
*Non-conference game. ^{#}Rankings from United Soccer Coaches. (#) Tournament seedings in parentheses.

== Rankings ==
Ranking movement Legend: ██ Improvement in ranking. ██ Decrease in ranking. ██ Not ranked the previous week. RV=Others receiving votes.
Poll	Pre	Wk 1	Wk 2	Wk 3	Wk 4	Wk 5	Wk 6	Wk 7	Wk 8	Wk 9	Wk 10	Wk 11	Wk 12	Wk 13	Wk 14	Wk 15	Wk 16	Final
United Soccer		RV	RV	RV										None Released				
TopDrawer Soccer			RV	RV	RV													
