= 2019 Syracuse Orange women's soccer team =

American college soccer season

2019 Syracuse Orange women's soccer
- Conference: Atlantic Coast Conference
- Record: 3–11–2 (1–7–1 ACC)
- Head coach: Nicky Adams (1st season)
- Assistant coaches: Kelly Madsen (1st season); Harold Warren (1st season)
- Home stadium: SU Soccer Stadium

2019 ACC women's soccer standings
	Conf.						Overall
Team	W		L		T	PCT	W		L		T	PCT
No. 2 North Carolina ‍†‍‡‍^{y}	9	–	0	–	1	.950	24	–	1	–	2	.926
No. 7 Florida State ‍‍‍^{y}	8	–	2	–	0	.800	18	–	6	–	0	.750
No. 9 Virginia ‍‍‍^{y}	6	–	0	–	3	.833	17	–	2	–	3	.841
No. 25 Louisville ‍‍‍^{y}	5	–	3	–	2	.600	13	–	5	–	2	.700
No. 17 NC State ‍‍‍^{y}	4	–	2	–	4	.600	12	–	7	–	4	.609
No. 18 Duke ‍‍‍^{y}	3	–	1	–	6	.600	9	–	4	–	7	.625
Clemson ‍‍‍^{y}	5	–	5	–	0	.500	11	–	7	–	2	.600
Notre Dame ‍‍‍^{y}	4	–	4	–	2	.500	11	–	8	–	2	.571
Virginia Tech ‍‍‍^{y}	4	–	4	–	2	.500	12	–	5	–	2	.684
Pittsburgh ‍‍‍	2	–	6	–	2	.300	5	–	10	–	3	.361
Miami ‍‍‍	2	–	7	–	1	.250	5	–	9	–	2	.375
Wake Forest ‍‍‍	1	–	6	–	3	.250	6	–	8	–	4	.444
Syracuse ‍‍‍	1	–	7	–	1	.167	3	–	11	–	2	.250
Boston College ‍‍‍	1	–	8	–	1	.150	8	–	8	–	2	.500
† – Conference champion ‡ – 2019 ACC Tournament champion y – Invited to the NCAA Tournament; As of December 10, 2019; Rankings from United Soccer Coaches Poll; Source: The ACC

The 2019 Syracuse Orange women's soccer team represented Syracuse University during the 2019 NCAA Division I women's soccer season. The Orange were led by head coach Nicky Adams, in her first season. They played home games at SU Soccer Stadium. This is the team's 23rd season playing organized women's college soccer, and their 7th playing in the Atlantic Coast Conference.

The Orange finished the season 3–11–2 overall, and 1–7–1 in ACC play to finish in thirteenth place. They did not qualify for the ACC Tournament and were not invited to the NCAA Tournament.

== Squad ==
=== Roster ===
Updated November 18, 2019

Note: Flags indicate national team as defined under FIFA eligibility rules; some limited exceptions apply. Players may hold more than one non-FIFA nationality.

No.	Pos.	Nation	Player
0	GK	USA	Michaela Walsh
1	GK	USA	Ally Wakeman
2	FW	USA	Kate Donovan
3	FW	USA	Sydney Brackett
4	DF	USA	Molly Nethercott
5	FW	USA	Marisa Fischetti
6	MF	USA	Kailee Coonan
7	DF	USA	Taylor Bennett
8	MF	USA	Kate Hostage
9	MF	ENG	Georgia Allen
10	DF	USA	Abby Jonathan
11	DF	USA	Jenna Tivnan
12	MF	USA	Victoria Hill

No.	Pos.	Nation	Player
13	DF	USA	Shannon Aviza
14	FW	USA	Alexandra Panaggio
15	DF	USA	Gianna Villoresi
16	DF	USA	Laurel Ness
17	MF	USA	Mackenzie Vlachos
19	GK	USA	Santita Ebangwese
20	MF	USA	Stephanie Delaforcade
22	GK	CAN	Lysianne Proulx
23	DF	USA	Clarke Brown
24	FW	USA	Meghan Root
25	MF	USA	Kailey Brenner
26	FW	USA	Teri Jackson
28	FW	USA	Alex Steigelfest

=== Team management ===
Position	Staff
Head coach	Nicky Adams
Assistant Coach	Kelly Madsen
Assistant Coach	Harold Warren
Volunteer Assistant Coach	Michael Flynn

== Schedule ==
Date Time, TV	Rank^{#}	Opponent^{#}	Result	Record	Site (Attendance) City, State
Non-conference regular season
August 25*; 7:00 p.m., ACCN		Colgate	W 1–0	1–0–0	SU Soccer Stadium (305); Syracuse, NY
August 29*; 6:00 p.m., ACCNX		Siena	W 3–0	2–0–0	SU Soccer Stadium (682); Syracuse, NY
September 1*; 1:00 p.m., ESPN+		at Dartmouth	L 0–2	2–1–0	Burnham Field (323); Hanover, NH
September 5*; 7:30 p.m., SECN+		at Auburn	L 0–2	2–2–0	Auburn Soccer Complex (481); Auburn, AL
September 8*; 1:00 p.m.		at Kent State	L 0–1	2–3–0	Dix Stadium (245); Kent, OH
September 12*; 6:00 p.m., ESPN3		at St. John's	L 0–1	2–4–0	Belson Stadium (423); Queens, NY
September 15*; 1:00 p.m., ACCNX		Fordham	T 0–0 ^{2OT}	2–4–1	SU Soccer Stadium (315); Syracuse, NY
ACC regular season
September 20; 7:00 p.m., ACCNX		at Pittsburgh	L 1–1 ^{2OT}	2–4–2 (0–0–1)	Ambrose Urbanic Field (532); Pittsburgh, PA
September 26; 6:00 p.m., ACCNX		No. 22 Louisville	L 0–3	2–5–2 (0–1–1)	SU Soccer Stadium (172); Syracuse, NY
September 29; 1:00 p.m., ACCNX		No. 6 Florida State	L 0–1	2–6–2 (0–2–1)	SU Soccer Stadium (582); Syracuse, NY
October 4; 7:00 p.m., ACCNX		at Notre Dame	L 0–3	2–7–2 (0–3–1)	Alumni Stadium (848); Notre Dame, IN
October 10; 7:00 p.m., ACCNX		Wake Forest	L 2–1 ^{OT}	3–7–2 (1–3–1)	SU Soccer Stadium (208); Syracuse, NY
October 13; 1:00 p.m., ACCNX		Miami (FL)	L 1–2	3–8–2 (1–4–1)	SU Soccer Stadium (438); Syracuse, NY
October 19; 7:00 p.m., ACCNX		at No. 17 Clemson	L 1–4	3–9–2 (1–5–1)	Riggs Field (293); Clemson, SC
October 24; 7:00 p.m., ACCNX		at NC State	L 2–3 ^{OT}	3–10–2 (1–6–1)	Dail Soccer Field (302); Raleigh, NC
October 27; 1:00 p.m., ACCNX		at No. 9 Duke	L 1–4	3–11–2 (1–7–1)	Koskinen Stadium (407); Durham, NC
October 31; 7:00 p.m., ACCNX		No. 1 Virginia	Canceled	3–11–2 (1–7–1)	SU Soccer Stadium; Syracuse, NY
*Non-conference game. ^{#}Rankings from United Soccer Coaches. (#) Tournament seedings in parentheses.

== Rankings ==
Ranking movement Legend: ██ Improvement in ranking. ██ Decrease in ranking. ██ Not ranked the previous week. RV=Others receiving votes.
Poll	Pre	Wk 1	Wk 2	Wk 3	Wk 4	Wk 5	Wk 6	Wk 7	Wk 8	Wk 9	Wk 10	Wk 11	Wk 12	Wk 13	Wk 14	Wk 15	Wk 16	Final
United Soccer														None Released				
TopDrawer Soccer																		
