= 2019 Wake Forest Demon Deacons women's soccer team =

American college soccer season

2019 Wake Forest Demon Deacons women's soccer
- Conference: Atlantic Coast Conference
- Record: 6–8–4 (1–6–3 ACC)
- Head coach: Tony da Luz (17th season)
- Assistant coaches: Philip Poole (1st season); Courtney Owen (3rd season)
- Home stadium: Spry Stadium

2019 ACC women's soccer standings
	Conf.						Overall
Team	W		L		T	PCT	W		L		T	PCT
No. 2 North Carolina ‍†‍‡‍^{y}	9	–	0	–	1	.950	24	–	1	–	2	.926
No. 7 Florida State ‍‍‍^{y}	8	–	2	–	0	.800	18	–	6	–	0	.750
No. 9 Virginia ‍‍‍^{y}	6	–	0	–	3	.833	17	–	2	–	3	.841
No. 25 Louisville ‍‍‍^{y}	5	–	3	–	2	.600	13	–	5	–	2	.700
No. 17 NC State ‍‍‍^{y}	4	–	2	–	4	.600	12	–	7	–	4	.609
No. 18 Duke ‍‍‍^{y}	3	–	1	–	6	.600	9	–	4	–	7	.625
Clemson ‍‍‍^{y}	5	–	5	–	0	.500	11	–	7	–	2	.600
Notre Dame ‍‍‍^{y}	4	–	4	–	2	.500	11	–	8	–	2	.571
Virginia Tech ‍‍‍^{y}	4	–	4	–	2	.500	12	–	5	–	2	.684
Pittsburgh ‍‍‍	2	–	6	–	2	.300	5	–	10	–	3	.361
Miami ‍‍‍	2	–	7	–	1	.250	5	–	9	–	2	.375
Wake Forest ‍‍‍	1	–	6	–	3	.250	6	–	8	–	4	.444
Syracuse ‍‍‍	1	–	7	–	1	.167	3	–	11	–	2	.250
Boston College ‍‍‍	1	–	8	–	1	.150	8	–	8	–	2	.500
† – Conference champion ‡ – 2019 ACC Tournament champion y – Invited to the NCAA Tournament; As of December 10, 2019; Rankings from United Soccer Coaches Poll; Source: The ACC

The 2019 Wake Forest Demon Deacons women's soccer team represented Wake Forest University during the 2019 NCAA Division I women's soccer season. The Demon Deacons were led by head coach Tony da Luz, in his seventeenth season. They played home games at Spry Stadium. This is the team's 25th season playing organized women's college soccer, all of which have been played in the Atlantic Coast Conference.

The Demon Deacons finished the season 6–8–4 overall, and 1–6–3 in ACC play to finish in twelfth place. They did not qualify for the ACC Tournament and were not invited to the NCAA Tournament.

== Squad ==
=== Roster ===
Updated August 28, 2020

Note: Flags indicate national team as defined under FIFA eligibility rules; some limited exceptions apply. Players may hold more than one non-FIFA nationality.

No.	Pos.	Nation	Player
1	GK	USA	Kaitlyn Parks
2	FW	USA	Hayley Younginer
3	MF	USA	Giovanna DeMarco
4	DF	GER	Vicky Krug
5	FW	USA	Ashley Frank
6	MF	USA	Madeline Allburn
7	FW	USA	Abby McNamara
8	FW	USA	Haley Jordahl
9	MF	NZL	Grace Jale
10	FW	FRA	Estelle Laurier
16	GK	USA	Mia Raben
17	DF	USA	Madisyn Opstal
18	FW	USA	Cameron Rawlings

No.	Pos.	Nation	Player
19	MF	USA	Lyndon Wood
20	FW	JAM	Shayla Smart
21	FW	USA	Ryanne Brown
22	GK	USA	Meghan Kennedy
23	MF	USA	Lauren Tangney
26	DF	USA	Mia Albery
28	FW	USA	Sofia Rossi
31	MF	USA	Brooke Smith
32	MF	USA	Aanchal Jain
33	FW	USA	Hannah Betfort
34	DF	USA	Lily Schneider
88	FW	ISL	Hulda Arnarsdottir
99	DF	USA	Madison Hammond

=== Team management ===
Position	Staff
Head coach	Tony da Luz
Assistant coach	Philip Poole
Assistant coach	Courtney Owen
Volunteer Assistant Coach	Marnie Merritt

== Schedule ==
Date Time, TV	Rank^{#}	Opponent^{#}	Result	Record	Site (Attendance) City, State
Exhibition
August 14*; 1:00 p.m.	No. 23	No. 11 West Virginia	L 1–2	–	Dick Dlesk Soccer Stadium; Morgantown, WV
August 17*; 7:00 p.m.	No. 23	Florida	W 3–2	–	Spry Stadium; Winston-Salem, NC
Non-conference regular season
August 22*; 7:00 p.m., ACCNX	No. 23	Temple	W 3–0	1–0–0	Spry Stadium; Winston-Salem, NC
August 25*; 6:00 p.m., ACCNX	No. 23	Appalachian State	W 2–0	2–0–0	Spry Stadium (713); Winston-Salem, NC
August 28*; 5:00 p.m., ACCN		No. 19 Santa Clara	W 2–1	3–0–0	Spry Stadium (487); Winston-Salem, NC
September 1*; 6:00 p.m., ACCNX		at Charlotte	W 3–0	4–0–0	Transamerica Field (823); Charlotte, NC
September 5*; 7:00 p.m., WatchESPN	No. 25	VCU	T 0–0 ^{2OT}	4–0–1	Spry Stadium (479); Winston-Salem, NC
September 8*; 1:00 p.m., ACCNX	No. 25	UNC Wilmington	W 2–0	5–0–1	Spry Stadium (478); Winston-Salem, NC
September 12*; 7:00 p.m., ACCNX		at No. 1 North Carolina	L 0–4	5–1–1	Dorrance Field (1,525); Chapel Hill, NC
September 15*; 2:00 p.m., WatchESPN		No. 25 South Florida	L 2–3	5–2–1	Spry Stadium (451); Winston-Salem, NC
ACC regular season
September 20; 7:00 p.m., ACCNX		No. 1 Virginia	T 1–1 ^{2OT}	5–2–2 (0–0–1)	Spry Stadium (1,011); Winston-Salem, NC
September 26; 7:00 p.m., ACCNX		No. 10 Duke	L 2–3	5–3–2 (0–1–1)	Spry Stadium (764); Winston-Salem, NC
September 29; 7:00 p.m., RSN		NC State	T 1–1 ^{2OT}	5–3–3 (0–1–2)	Spry Stadium (541); Winston-Salem, NC
October 3; 7:00 p.m., ACCN		at No. 19 Louisville	L 1–2	5–4–3 (0–2–2)	Lynn Stadium (843); Louisville, KY
October 10; 7:00 p.m., ACCNX		at Syracuse	L 1–2 ^{OT}	5–5–3 (0–3–2)	SU Soccer Stadium (208); Syracuse, NY
October 13; 1:00 p.m., ACCNX		at Boston College	T 3–3 ^{2OT}	5–5–4 (0–3–3)	Newton Campus Soccer Field (863); Newton, MA
October 18; 8:00 p.m., ACCNX		at Virginia Tech	L 0–1	5–6–4 (0–4–3)	Thompson Field (619); Blacksburg, VA
October 24; 7:00 p.m., ACCNX		Pittsburgh	W 3–2 ^{2OT}	6–6–4 (1–4–3)	Spry Stadium (760); Winston-Salem, NC
October 27; 1:00 p.m., ACCN		No. 5 Florida State	L 1–2	6–7–4 (1–5–3)	Spry Stadium (545); Winston-Salem, NC
October 31; 7:00 p.m., ACCNX		at Notre Dame	L 2–3 ^{2OT}	6–8–4 (1–6–3)	Alumni Stadium (352); Notre Dame, IN
*Non-conference game. ^{#}Rankings from United Soccer Coaches. (#) Tournament seedings in parentheses.

== Rankings ==
Ranking movement Legend: ██ Improvement in ranking. ██ Decrease in ranking. ██ Not ranked the previous week. RV=Others receiving votes.
Poll	Pre	Wk 1	Wk 2	Wk 3	Wk 4	Wk 5	Wk 6	Wk 7	Wk 8	Wk 9	Wk 10	Wk 11	Wk 12	Wk 13	Wk 14	Wk 15	Wk 16	Final
United Soccer	23	RV	25	RV		RV	RV							None Released				
TopDrawer Soccer	RV	RV	25	20	21													
