= 2019 ACC women's soccer tournament =

- Classification: Division I
- Teams: 8
- Matches: 7
- Attendance: 6,540
- Site: Sahlen's Stadium; Campus Sites (Quarterfinals); Cary, North Carolina (Semifinals and Final)
- Champions: North Carolina (22 title)
- Winning coach: Anson Dorrance (22 title)
- MVP: (England) Alessia Russo (North Carolina)
- Broadcast: ACCN (Semifinals), ESPNU (Final)

2019 ACC women's soccer standings
	Conf.						Overall
Team	W		L		T	PCT	W		L		T	PCT
No. 2 North Carolina ‍†‍‡‍^{y}	9	–	0	–	1	.950	24	–	1	–	2	.926
No. 7 Florida State ‍‍‍^{y}	8	–	2	–	0	.800	18	–	6	–	0	.750
No. 9 Virginia ‍‍‍^{y}	6	–	0	–	3	.833	17	–	2	–	3	.841
No. 25 Louisville ‍‍‍^{y}	5	–	3	–	2	.600	13	–	5	–	2	.700
No. 17 NC State ‍‍‍^{y}	4	–	2	–	4	.600	12	–	7	–	4	.609
No. 18 Duke ‍‍‍^{y}	3	–	1	–	6	.600	9	–	4	–	7	.625
Clemson ‍‍‍^{y}	5	–	5	–	0	.500	11	–	7	–	2	.600
Notre Dame ‍‍‍^{y}	4	–	4	–	2	.500	11	–	8	–	2	.571
Virginia Tech ‍‍‍^{y}	4	–	4	–	2	.500	12	–	5	–	2	.684
Pittsburgh ‍‍‍	2	–	6	–	2	.300	5	–	10	–	3	.361
Miami ‍‍‍	2	–	7	–	1	.250	5	–	9	–	2	.375
Wake Forest ‍‍‍	1	–	6	–	3	.250	6	–	8	–	4	.444
Syracuse ‍‍‍	1	–	7	–	1	.167	3	–	11	–	2	.250
Boston College ‍‍‍	1	–	8	–	1	.150	8	–	8	–	2	.500
† – Conference champion ‡ – 2019 ACC Tournament champion y – Invited to the NCAA Tournament; As of December 10, 2019; Rankings from United Soccer Coaches Poll; Source: The ACC

The 2019 Atlantic Coast Conference women's soccer tournament was the 32nd edition of the ACC Women's Soccer Tournament. The tournament decided the Atlantic Coast Conference champion and guaranteed representative into the 2019 NCAA Division I Women's Soccer Tournament. The semifinals and final were played at Sahlen's Stadium in Cary, NC.

The defending champions were the Florida State Seminoles. The Seminoles fell in their title defense in the semifinals, losing to Virginia. North Carolina beat Virginia in the final, 2–1, to claim their twenty-second ACC title. It was coach Anson Dorrance's twenty-second title as well.

== Qualification ==
The top eight teams in the Atlantic Coast Conference earned a berth into the ACC Tournament. The quarterfinal round was held at campus sites, while the semifinals and final took place at Sahlen's Stadium in Cary, North Carolina.

Seed	School	Conference Record	Points
1	North Carolina	9–0–1	28
2	Florida State	8–2–0	24
3	Virginia	6–0–3	21
4	Louisville	5–3–2	17
5	NC State	4–2–4	16
6	Duke	3–1–6	15
7	Clemson	5–5–0	15
8	Notre Dame	4–4–2	14

== Bracket ==
Quarterfinals; Sunday, November 3
1	North Carolina	3
8	Notre Dame	0
4	Louisville	1
5	NC State	2^{(OT)}
2	Florida State	2
7	Clemson	1
3	Virginia	1
6	Duke	0

Semifinals; Friday, November 8
1	North Carolina	3
5	NC State	0
2	Florida State	1
3	Virginia	2^{(OT)}

Final; Sunday, November 10
1	North Carolina	2^{(2OT)}
3	Virginia	1

== Schedule ==
=== Quarterfinals ===
November 3	#2 Florida State	2–1	#7 Clemson	Tallahassee, FL
1:00 p.m. EDT	Deyna Castellanos 17'; Gabby Carle (yellow card) 18'; Jaelin Howell 77'	Report	63' Lauren Bruns; (yellow card) 77' Jackson Moehler	Stadium: Seminole Soccer Complex; Attendance: 991; Referee: Peter Dhima; Assistant referees: Arnel Selman; Keith Southwell; Fourth official: Blake Williams

November 3	#4 Louisville	1–2 (a.e.t.)	#5 NC State	Louisville, KY
3:00 p.m. EDT	Brookylnn Rivers 70' (pen.)	Report	53' Team; 96' Tziarra King	Stadium: Lynn Stadium; Attendance: 307; Referee: Nick Balcer; Assistant referees: Josh Brooks; Johann Pedolzky; Fourth official: Sarah Renyer

November 3	#3 Virginia	1–0	#6 Duke	Charlottesville, VA
5:00 p.m. EDT	Meghan McCool 54'	Report		Stadium: Klöckner Stadium; Attendance: 0 Referee: Sergio Gonzales; Assistant referees: Kevin Uitto; Anthony Wolford; Fourth official: Chuck Ackerman

November 3	#1 North Carolina	3–0	#8 Notre Dame	Chapel Hill, NC
7:00 p.m. EDT	Lotte Wubben-Moy 51', 84'; Bridgette Andrzejewski (yellow card) 54'; Ru Mucherera 73'; Alessia Russo (yellow card) 75'	Report	(yellow card) 54' Brianna Martinez	Stadium: Dorrance Field; Attendance: 875; Referee: Mark Gorak; Assistant referees: Daniel Kappler; Chris Duerner; Fourth official: Javier Rodriguez

=== Semifinals ===
November 8	#2 Florida State	1–2 (a.e.t.)	#3 Virginia	Cary, North Carolina
2:30 p.m. EDT	Kristen McFarland 81'	Report	66' Zoe Morse; 96' Rebecca Jarrett	Stadium: Sahlen's Stadium; Referee: Mark Gorak; Assistant referees: Arnel Selman; Dustin Thorne; Fourth official: Tori Penso

November 8	#1 North Carolina	3–0	#5 NC State	Cary, North Carolina
5:00 p.m. EDT	Alessia Russo 7', 88'; Rachel Jones 74'	Report		Stadium: Sahlen's Stadium; Attendance: 1,875; Referee: Tori Penso; Assistant referees: Raymond Thomas; Kevin Maurer; Fourth official: Mark Gorak

=== Final ===
November 10	#1 North Carolina	2–1 (a.e.t.)	#3 Virginia	Cary, North Carolina
12:00 p.m. EDT	Maycee Bell 5'; Emily Fox (yellow card) 99'; Alessia Russo 101'	Report	(yellow card) 59' Phoebe McClernon; 67' Diana Ordoñez	Stadium: Sahlen's Stadium; Attendance: 2,492; Referee: John McCloskey; Assistant referees: Raymond Thomas; Arnel Sleman; Fourth official: Scott Bowers

== Statistics ==
=== Goalscorers ===
3 Goals

- Alessia Russo – North Carolina

2 Goals

- Lotte Wubben-Moy – North Carolina

1 Goal

- Maycee Bell – North Carolina
- Lauren Bruns – Clemson
- Deyna Castellanos – Florida State
- Jaelin Howell – Florida State
- Tziarra King – NC State
- Rebecca Jarrett – Virginia
- Rachel Jones – North Carolina
- Meghan McCool – Virginia
- Kristen McFarland – Florida State
- Zoe Morse – Virginia
- Ru Mucherera – North Carolina
- Diana Ordóñez – Virginia
- Brookylnn Rivers – Louisville

== All Tournament Team ==
Player	Team
**Alessia Russo**	North Carolina
Maycee Bell	North Carolina
Claudia Dickey	North Carolina
Emily Fox	North Carolina
Lotte Wubben-Moy	North Carolina
Rebecca Jarrett	Virginia
Zoe Morse	Virginia
Diana Ordóñez	Virginia
Alexa Spaanstra	Virginia
Deyna Castellanos	Florida State
Tziarra King	NC State

MVP in bold

== See also ==
- Atlantic Coast Conference
- 2019 Atlantic Coast Conference women's soccer season
- 2019 NCAA Division I women's soccer season
- 2019 NCAA Division I Women's Soccer Tournament
