= 2019 Duke Blue Devils women's soccer team =

American college soccer season

2019 Duke Blue Devils women's soccer

NCAA Tournament, Second Round
- Conference: Atlantic Coast Conference
- U. Soc. Coaches poll: No. 18
- TopDrawerSoccer.com: No. 17
- Record: 9–4–7 (3–1–6 ACC)
- Head coach: Robbie Church (19th season)
- Assistant coaches: Kieran Hall (1st season); Carla Overbeck (26th season); Lane Davis (4th season)
- Home stadium: Koskinen Stadium

2019 ACC women's soccer standings
	Conf.						Overall
Team	W		L		T	PCT	W		L		T	PCT
No. 2 North Carolina ‍†‍‡‍^{y}	9	–	0	–	1	.950	24	–	1	–	2	.926
No. 7 Florida State ‍‍‍^{y}	8	–	2	–	0	.800	18	–	6	–	0	.750
No. 9 Virginia ‍‍‍^{y}	6	–	0	–	3	.833	17	–	2	–	3	.841
No. 25 Louisville ‍‍‍^{y}	5	–	3	–	2	.600	13	–	5	–	2	.700
No. 17 NC State ‍‍‍^{y}	4	–	2	–	4	.600	12	–	7	–	4	.609
No. 18 Duke ‍‍‍^{y}	3	–	1	–	6	.600	9	–	4	–	7	.625
Clemson ‍‍‍^{y}	5	–	5	–	0	.500	11	–	7	–	2	.600
Notre Dame ‍‍‍^{y}	4	–	4	–	2	.500	11	–	8	–	2	.571
Virginia Tech ‍‍‍^{y}	4	–	4	–	2	.500	12	–	5	–	2	.684
Pittsburgh ‍‍‍	2	–	6	–	2	.300	5	–	10	–	3	.361
Miami ‍‍‍	2	–	7	–	1	.250	5	–	9	–	2	.375
Wake Forest ‍‍‍	1	–	6	–	3	.250	6	–	8	–	4	.444
Syracuse ‍‍‍	1	–	7	–	1	.167	3	–	11	–	2	.250
Boston College ‍‍‍	1	–	8	–	1	.150	8	–	8	–	2	.500
† – Conference champion ‡ – 2019 ACC Tournament champion y – Invited to the NCAA Tournament; As of December 10, 2019; Rankings from United Soccer Coaches Poll; Source: The ACC

The 2019 Duke Blue Devils women's soccer team represented Duke University during the 2019 NCAA Division I women's soccer season. The Blue Devils were led by head coach Robbie Church, in his nineteenth season. They played home games at Koskinen Stadium. This was the team's 32nd season playing organized women's college soccer and their 32nd playing in the Atlantic Coast Conference.

The Blue Devils finished the season 9–4–7, 3–1–6 in ACC play to finish in sixth place. As the sixth seed in the ACC Tournament, lost to Virginia in the Quarterfinals. They received an at-large bid to the NCAA Tournament where they defeated Utah before losing to Wisconsin in the Second Round.

== Squad ==
=== Roster ===
Updated July 6, 2020

Note: Flags indicate national team as defined under FIFA eligibility rules; some limited exceptions apply. Players may hold more than one non-FIFA nationality.

No.	Pos.	Nation	Player
1	GK	USA	Brooke Heinsohn
2	DF	USA	Natalie Maurer
3	DF	USA	Taylor Mitchell
4	DF	USA	Remi Swartz
5	MF	USA	Sarah Piper
6	DF	USA	Caitlin Cosme
7	MF	USA	Sophie Jones
8	FW	USA	Tess Boade
10	MF	USA	Olivia Erlbeck
11	MF	USA	Julia Burnell
12	FW	USA	Marykate McGuire
13	FW	USA	Emmy Duerr
14	MF	USA	Julia Hannon

No.	Pos.	Nation	Player
16	MF	USA	Sydney Simmons
17	MF	USA	Ella Stevens
18	DF	USA	Karlie Paschall
20	MF	USA	Mia Gyau
21	MF	USA	Sarah Miller
22	DF	USA	Delaney Graham
23	GK	USA	Holly Stam
24	MF	USA	Mackenzie Pluck
25	GK	USA	Mackenzie Coles
26	GK	USA	Ruthie Jones
27	DF	USA	Natasha Turner
28	MF	USA	Lily Nabet

=== Team management ===
Position	Staff
Head coach	Robbie Church
Assistant Coach	Kieran Hall
Assistant Coach	Carla Overbeck
Assistant Coach	Lane Davis

== Schedule ==
Date Time, TV	Rank^{#}	Opponent^{#}	Result	Record	Site (Attendance) City, State
Exhibition
August 12*; 7:00 p.m.	No. 8	Campbell	W 3–0	–	Koskinen Stadium; Durham, NC
August 16*; 6:00 p.m.	No. 8	at Georgia	T 0–0	–	Turner Soccer Complex; Athens, GA
Non-conference regular season
August 22*; 4:00 p.m.	No. 8	vs. La Salle; Carolina Nike Tournament	W 2–0	1–0–0	Dorrance Field; Chapel Hill, NC
August 25*; 6:00 p.m.	No. 8	at No. 2 North Carolina; Carolina Nike Tournament	L 0–2	1–1–0	Dorrance Field (4,215); Chapel Hill, NC
August 28*; 7:00 p.m.	No. 10	No. 13 Georgetown	T 0–0 ^{2OT}	1–1–1	Koskinen Stadium (633); Durham, NC
August 31*; 7:00 p.m.	No. 10	No. 19 Santa Clara	W 3–2 ^{OT}	2–1–1	Koskinen Stadium (903); Durham, NC
September 5*; 6:00 p.m.	No. 12	UNLV; Duke Nike Classic	W 3–0	3–1–1	Koskinen Stadium; Durham, NC
September 8*; 1:30 p.m.	No. 12	LSU; Duke Nike Classic	W 6–0	4–1–1	Koskinen Stadium (621); Durham, NC
September 15*; 6:00 p.m.	No. 11	James Madison	W 6–0	5–1–1	Koskinen Stadium (553); Durham, NC
ACC regular season
September 22; 1:00 p.m.	No. 8	NC State	T 1–1 ^{2OT}	5–1–2 (0–0–1)	Koskinen Stadium (622); Durham, NC
September 26; 7:00 p.m.	No. 10	at Wake Forest	W 3–2	6–1–2 (1–0–1)	Spry Stadium (764); Winston-Salem, NC
September 29; 2:00 p.m.	No. 10	at No. 1 Virginia	T 0–0 ^{2OT}	6–1–3 (1–0–2)	Klöckner Stadium (2,048); Charlottesville, VA
October 6; 2:00 p.m.	No. 10	at No. 23 Virginia Tech	T 0–0 ^{2OT}	6–1–4 (1–0–3)	Thompson Field (618); Blacksburg, VA
October 10; 7:00 p.m.	No. 11	No. 3 North Carolina	T 0–0 ^{2OT}	6–1–5 (1–0–4)	Koskinen Stadium (3,176); Durham, NC
October 13; 1:00 p.m.	No. 11	No. 9 Clemson	W 4–1	7–1–5 (2–0–4)	Koskinen Stadium (313); Durham, NC
October 18; 5:00 p.m.	No. 9	at No. 14 Louisville	T 1–1 ^{2OT}	7–1–6 (2–0–5)	Lynn Stadium (1,998); Louisville, KY
October 24; 7:00 p.m.	No. 9	Notre Dame	T 1–1 ^{2OT}	7–1–7 (2–0–6)	Koskinen Stadium (541); Durham, NC
October 27; 1:00 p.m.	No. 9	Syracuse	W 4–1	8–1–7 (3–0–6)	Koskinen Stadium (407); Durham, NC
October 31; 8:00 p.m.	No. 9	at No. 5 Florida State	L 0–1	8–2–7 (3–1–6)	Seminole Soccer Complex; Tallahassee, FL
ACC tournament
November 3; 5:00 p.m.	(6) No. 9	at (3) No. 1 Virginia; Quarterfinals	L 0–1	8–3–7	Klöckner Stadium; Charlottesville, VA
NCAA tournament
November 15; 6:00 p.m.	No. 12	Utah; First Round	W 4–0	9–3–7	Koskinen Stadium (190); Durham, NC
November 22; 5:00 p.m.	No. 12	vs. (3) No. 10 Wisconsin; Second Round	L 0–1	9–4–7	Wallis Annenberg Stadium (755); Los Angeles, California
*Non-conference game. ^{#}Rankings from United Soccer Coaches. (#) Tournament seedings in parentheses.

== 2020 NWSL College Draft ==
Player	Team	Round	Pick #	Position
Ella Stevens	Chicago Red Stars	3	24	FW

== Rankings ==
Ranking movement Legend: ██ Improvement in ranking. ██ Decrease in ranking. ██ Not ranked the previous week. RV=Others receiving votes.
Poll	Pre	Wk 1	Wk 2	Wk 3	Wk 4	Wk 5	Wk 6	Wk 7	Wk 8	Wk 9	Wk 10	Wk 11	Wk 12	Wk 13	Wk 14	Wk 15	Wk 16	Final
United Soccer	8	10	12	11	8	10	10	11	9	9	9	12	12	None Released				18
TopDrawer Soccer	17	17	22	18	16	15	12	11	12	10	11	11	18	20	16	17	17	17
