= 2019 Florida State Seminoles women's soccer team =

2019 Florida State Seminoles women's soccer

NCAA Tournament, Quarterfinals
- Conference: Atlantic Coast Conference
- U. Soc. Coaches poll: No. 7
- TopDrawerSoccer.com: No. 5
- Record: 18–6–0 (8–2–0 ACC)
- Head coach: Mark Krikorian (15th season)
- Assistant coaches: Mike Bristol (11th season); Morinao Imaizumi (7th season)
- Home stadium: Seminole Soccer Complex

2019 ACC women's soccer standings
	Conf.						Overall
Team	W		L		T	PCT	W		L		T	PCT
No. 2 North Carolina ‍†‍‡‍^{y}	9	–	0	–	1	.950	24	–	1	–	2	.926
No. 7 Florida State ‍‍‍^{y}	8	–	2	–	0	.800	18	–	6	–	0	.750
No. 9 Virginia ‍‍‍^{y}	6	–	0	–	3	.833	17	–	2	–	3	.841
No. 25 Louisville ‍‍‍^{y}	5	–	3	–	2	.600	13	–	5	–	2	.700
No. 17 NC State ‍‍‍^{y}	4	–	2	–	4	.600	12	–	7	–	4	.609
No. 18 Duke ‍‍‍^{y}	3	–	1	–	6	.600	9	–	4	–	7	.625
Clemson ‍‍‍^{y}	5	–	5	–	0	.500	11	–	7	–	2	.600
Notre Dame ‍‍‍^{y}	4	–	4	–	2	.500	11	–	8	–	2	.571
Virginia Tech ‍‍‍^{y}	4	–	4	–	2	.500	12	–	5	–	2	.684
Pittsburgh ‍‍‍	2	–	6	–	2	.300	5	–	10	–	3	.361
Miami ‍‍‍	2	–	7	–	1	.250	5	–	9	–	2	.375
Wake Forest ‍‍‍	1	–	6	–	3	.250	6	–	8	–	4	.444
Syracuse ‍‍‍	1	–	7	–	1	.167	3	–	11	–	2	.250
Boston College ‍‍‍	1	–	8	–	1	.150	8	–	8	–	2	.500
† – Conference champion ‡ – 2019 ACC Tournament champion y – Invited to the NCAA Tournament; As of December 10, 2019; Rankings from United Soccer Coaches Poll; Source: The ACC

The 2019 Florida State Seminoles women's soccer team represented Florida State University during the 2019 NCAA Division I women's soccer season. It was the 25th season of the university fielding a program. The Seminoles were led by 15th year head coach Mark Krikorian and entered the season as the defending national champions.

The Seminoles finished the season 18–6–0, 8–2–0 in ACC play, to finish in second place. As the second seed in the ACC Tournament, they defeated Clemson in the first round before losing in overtime to Virginia in the semifinals. They received an at-large bid to the NCAA Tournament where they defeated South Alabama, Brown, and USF, before losing to UCLA in the quarterfinals.

== Squad ==
=== Roster ===
Note: Flags indicate national team as defined under FIFA eligibility rules; some limited exceptions apply. Players may hold more than one non-FIFA nationality.

No.	Pos.	Nation	Player
0	GK	USA	Caroline Jeffers
2	FW	USA	Jenna Nighswonger
3	MF	USA	Abbey Newton
4	MF	USA	Kristina Lynch
6	MF	USA	Jaelin Howell
7	DF	USA	Ali Kalayjian
8	FW	USA	Paige LeBerge
9	MF	USA	Kirsten Pavlisko
10	FW	VEN	Deyna Castellanos
12	MF	IRL	Heather Payne
13	FW	BER	LeiLanni Nesbeth

No.	Pos.	Nation	Player
16	DF	CAN	Gabby Carle
17	DF	USA	Malia Berkely
20	FW	USA	Kristen McFarland
22	DF	USA	Alyssa Conarton
23	DF	USA	Taylor Radecki
24	FW	USA	Makala Thomas
25	MF	USA	Emily Madril
26	DF	USA	Clara Robbins
33	MF	CHN	Yujie Zhao
45	GK	USA	Brooke Bollinger

=== Team management ===
Position	Staff
Athletic Director	David Coburn
Head coach	Mark Krikorian
Assistant Coach	Mike Bristol
Assistant Coach	Morinao Imaizumi
Director of Operations	Nathan Minion

== Schedule ==
Date Time, TV	Rank^{#}	Opponent^{#}	Result	Record	Site (Attendance) City, State
Non-conference regular season
August 22, 2019*; 11:00 a.m., ACCNX	No. 1	TCU	W 2–0	1–0–0	Seminole Soccer Complex (1,500); Tallahassee, FL
August 25, 2019*; 1:00 p.m., ACCN	No. 1	No. 16 Wisconsin	W 1–0 ^{OT}	2–0–0	Seminole Soccer Complex (716); Tallahassee, FL
August 29, 2019*; Pac-12	No. 1	at No. 4 UCLA; Battle at the Banc	L 1–2	2–1–0	Banc of California Stadium (0); Los Angeles, CA
September 1, 2019*; Pac-12	No. 1	at No. 5 USC; Battle at the Banc	L 2–3	2–2–0	Banc of California Stadium (0); Los Angeles, CA
September 6, 2019*; ACCNX	No. 6	Florida; Rivalry	W 2–1	3–2–0	Seminole Soccer Complex (3,154); Tallahassee, FL
September 8, 2019*; ACCNX	No. 6	Samford	W 6–0	4–2–0	Seminole Soccer Complex (385); Tallahassee, FL
September 12, 2019*; ACCN	No. 6	No. 24 Colorado	W 3–2 ^{OT}	5–2–0	Seminole Soccer Complex (2,210); Tallahassee, FL
September 15, 2019*	No. 6	at Villanova	W 5–0	6–2–0	Higgins Soccer Complex (837); Villanova, PA
ACC regular season
September 19, 2019; 7:00 p.m., ACCN	No. 6	Boston College	W 5–4	7–2–0 (1–0–0)	Seminole Soccer Complex (1,102); Tallahassee, FL
September 26, 2019; 7:00 p.m., ACCNX	No. 6	at No. 9 Clemson	W 2–1	8–2–0 (2–0–0)	Riggs Field (1,052); Clemson, SC
September 29, 2019; 1:00 p.m., ACCNX	No. 6	at Syracuse	W 1–0	9–2–0 (3–0–0)	SU Soccer Stadium (582); Syracuse, NY
October 5, 2019; 1:00 p.m., ACCN	No. 6	Pittsburgh	W 1–0	10–2–0 (4–0–0)	Seminole Soccer Complex (478); Tallahassee, FL
October 10, 2019; 7:00 p.m., RSN	No. 5	at No. 20 Virginia Tech	W 3–2 ^{2OT}	11–2–0 (5–0–0)	Thompson Field (1,017); Blacksburg, VA
October 13, 2019; 1:00 p.m., ACCN	No. 5	No. 1 Virginia	L 0–1 ^{2OT}	11–3–0 (5–1–0)	Seminole Soccer Complex; Tallahassee, FL
October 18, 2019; 7:00 p.m., RSN	No. 6	Miami (FL); Rivalry	W 3–0	12–3–0 (6–1–0)	Seminole Soccer Complex (670); Tallahassee, FL
October 24, 2019; 7:00 p.m., ACCN	No. 5	at No. 3 North Carolina	L 0–2	12–4–0 (6–2–0)	Dorrance Field (3,021); Chapel Hill, NC
October 27, 2019; 1:00 p.m., ACCN	No. 5	at Wake Forest	W 2–1	13–4–0 (7–2–0)	Spry Stadium (545); Winston-Salem, NC
October 31, 2019; 7:00 p.m., ACCN	No. 5	No. 9 Duke	W 1–0	14–4–0 (8–2–0)	Seminole Soccer Complex; Tallahassee, FL
ACC tournament
November 3, 2019; 1:00 p.m., ACCN	(2) No. 5	(7) No. 22 Clemson; Quarterfinals	W 2–1	15–4–0	Seminole Soccer Complex (991); Tallahassee, FL
November 8, 2019; 2:30 p.m., ACCN	(2) No. 5	(3) No. 1 Virginia; Semifinals	L 1–2 ^{OT}	15–5–0	Sahlen's Stadium (1,875); Cary, NC
NCAA tournament
November 16, 2019; 6:00 p.m.	(1) No. 6	South Alabama; First Round	W 2–0	16–5–0	Seminole Soccer Complex (1,135); Tallahassee, FL
November 22, 2019 :00 p.m.	(1) No. 6	No. 16 Brown; Second Round	W 2–0	17–5–0	Seminole Soccer Complex (232); Tallahassee, FL
November 24, 2019; 5:00 p.m.	(1) No. 6	No. 17 South Florida; Round of 16	W 2–1	18–5–0	Seminole Soccer Complex (1,032); Tallahassee, FL
November 29, 2019; 2:00 p.m.	(1) No. 6	(2) No. 7 UCLA; Quarterfinals	L 0–4	18–6–0	Seminole Soccer Complex (2,079); Tallahassee, FL
*Non-conference game. ^{#}Rankings from United Soccer Coaches. (#) Tournament seedings in parentheses.

== Rankings ==
Ranking movement Legend: ██ Improvement in ranking. ██ Decrease in ranking. ██ Not ranked the previous week. RV=Others receiving votes.
Poll	Pre	Wk 1	Wk 2	Wk 3	Wk 4	Wk 5	Wk 6	Wk 7	Wk 8	Wk 9	Wk 10	Wk 11	Wk 12	Wk 13	Wk 14	Wk 15	Wk 16	Final
United Soccer	1 (33)	1 (26)	6	6	6	6	6	5	6	5	5	5	6	None Released				7
TopDrawer Soccer	1	1	1	7	7	6	6	4	4	6	5	6	6	5	5	4	5	5
