= Newton Campus Soccer Field =

Soccer field of Boston College

Newton Campus Lacrosse & Soccer Field
- Interactive map of Newton Campus; Lacrosse & Soccer Field
- Location: 885 Centre Street; Newton, Massachusetts 02459
- Coordinates: 42°20′40″N 71°11′43″W
- Owner: Boston College
- Operator: Boston College Athletics
- Capacity: 1,800
- Surface: AstroTurf

Construction
- Opened: 1999; 27 years ago

Tenants
- Boston College Eagles teams: Men's and Women's soccer; Women's lacrosse

Website
- bceagles.com//newton-campus

The Newton Campus Lacrosse & Soccer Field is the on-campus soccer and lacrosse stadium at Boston College in Newton, Massachusetts.

The 1,800 person capacity stadium was built in 1999. The current tenants are the Boston College Eagles men's & women's soccer teams and Boston College Eagles women's lacrosse.

== Renovations ==
Prior to the 2003 season, lights were added to the field. In 2008, the turf was switched from natural grass to AstroTurf, and this surface was upgraded again in 2014.
