= Cobb Stadium =

Stadium in Coral Gables, Florida

Coordinates: 25°42′48″N 80°16′56″W

- Interactive map of Cobb Stadium
- Location: Coral Gables, Florida
- Owner: University of Miami

Tenant
- Miami Hurricanes (NCAA)

Cobb Stadium is a multi-purpose stadium located on the University of Miami campus in Coral Gables, Florida.

Cobb Stadium is home to the University of Miami's women's soccer and men's and women's track and field teams. The stadium was dedicated in 1999. It is named after former University of Miami chairman of the board Charles Cobb. The Cobb family donated the leadership gift for reconstruction of the track and soccer field. It is an eight lane rubber track with a soccer field inside the track, including four light banks and a 500-seat grandstand on its west side.

The stadium is located on the University of Miami campus south of Hecht Athletic Center along San Amaro Drive in Coral Gables, Florida.
