= Dail Soccer Field =

North Carolina soccer stadium

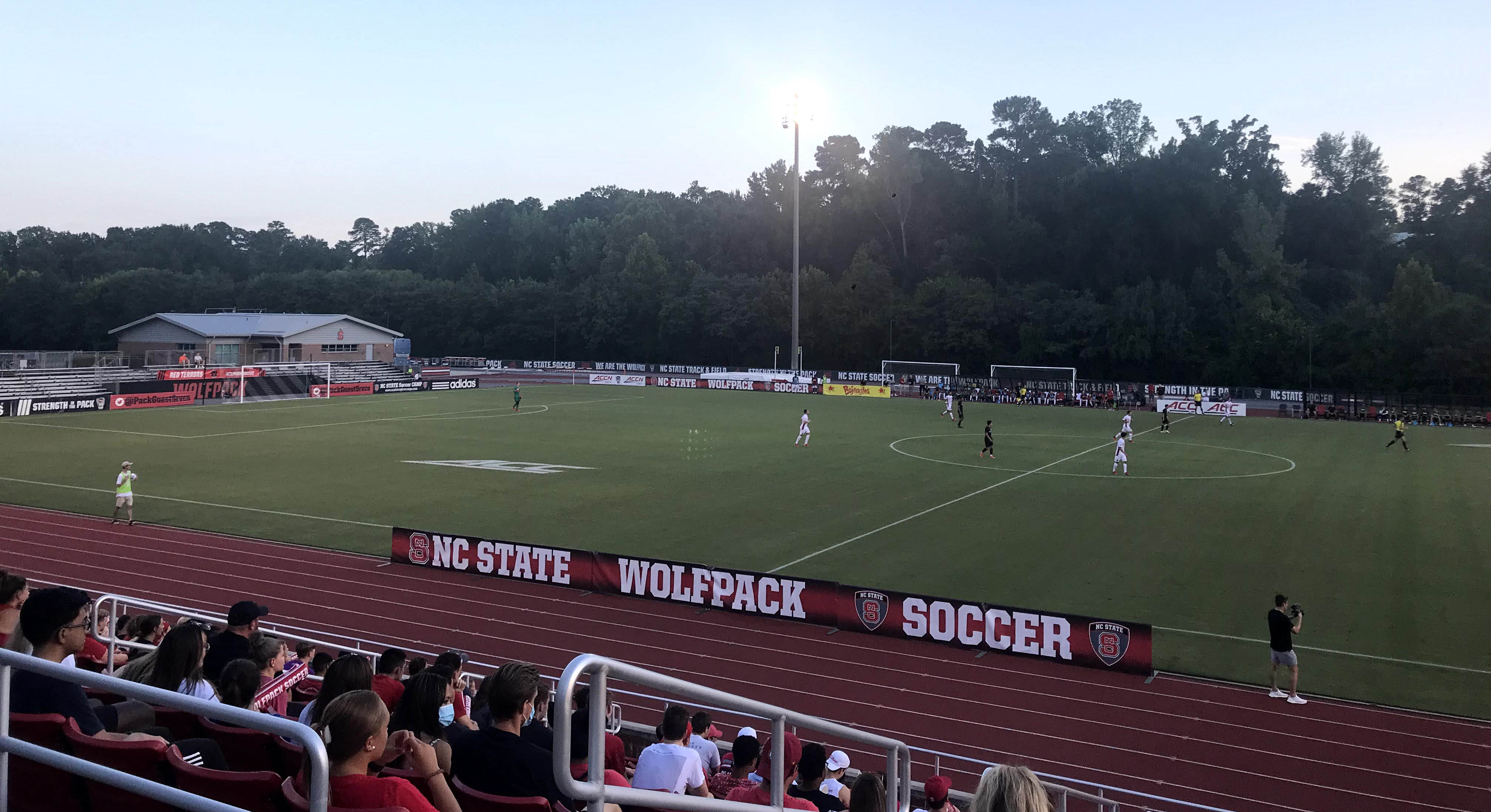
- The venue in 2021
- Interactive map of Dail Soccer Field
- Location: 2495 Cates Avenue; Raleigh, North Carolina 27606
- Coordinates: 35°46′54″N 78°40′09″W
- Owner: North Carolina State University
- Operator: North Carolina State Athletics
- Capacity: 3,000
- Surface: Lawn

Construction
- Opened: 2008; 18 years ago

Tenants
- NC State Wolfpack teams: Men's soccer; Women's soccer

Website
- gopack.com/dail-soccer-field

The Dail Soccer Field is the on-campus soccer stadium at North Carolina State University in Raleigh, North Carolina. With a capacity of 3,000-seat, it was built in 2008. The current tenants are the NC State Wolfpack men's and women's soccer teams. The opening of the stadium allowed both soccer teams to play night games because their prior stadium did not include flood lights. Prior to the soccer stadium being completed, the complex was used as a training site for athletes from Australia, New Zealand, Jamaica and Norway prior to the 1996 Summer Olympics in Atlanta.

== Renovations ==
During the summer of 2011 the stadium received upgraded seating and bleachers behind both goals. A new brick look also encompasses a majority of the upgrades that have been made to the stadium, while a press box, new fan entrance and a brand-new stand alone building in the southeast corner of the stadium provides a meeting and locker room space and showers.
