= Seminole Soccer Complex =

Soccer stadium in Tallahassee, Florida

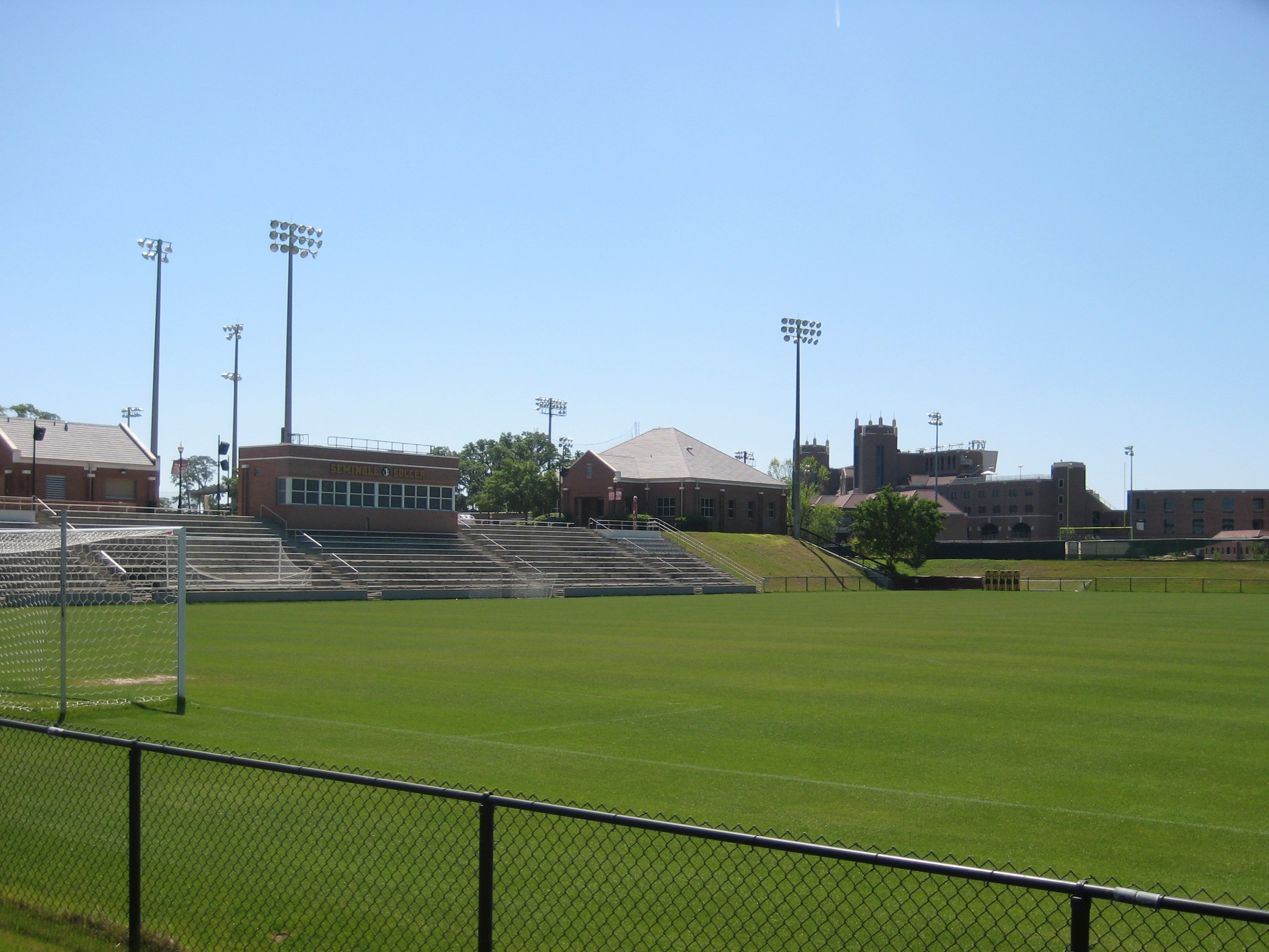
- The stadium in 2008
- Interactive map of Seminole Soccer Complex
- Location: Spirit Way; Tallahassee, Florida 32304
- Owner: Florida State University
- Operator: Florida State Seminoles
- Capacity: 2,000
- Surface: Grass
- Record attendance: 4,582

Construction
- Groundbreaking: 1998
- Opened: 1999; 27 years ago

Tenant
- Florida State women's soccer (NCAA)

The Seminole Soccer Complex is the on-campus soccer stadium at Florida State University in Tallahassee, Florida.

Construction on the 2,000-seat complex began in 1998, and the soccer stadium was ready for the 1999 season. The current tenants are the Florida State Seminoles women's soccer team, who are 180-38-16 at home

== Championships ==
The women's soccer team won the 2014 National Championship with a 1–0 win over the University of Virginia and the 2018 National Championship with 1–0 win over the University of North Carolina, in addition to championships in 2021, 2023 and another 1-0 win over Stanford University 2025.
