= 2020 North Carolina Tar Heels women's soccer team =

American college soccer season

2020 North Carolina Tar Heels women's soccer

ACC Regular Season co-champions

NCAA Tournament, Semifinals
- Conference: Atlantic Coast Conference
- U. Soc. Coaches poll: No. 3
- TopDrawerSoccer.com: No. 4
- Record: 18–2–0 (8–0–0 ACC)
- Head coach: Anson Dorrance (44th season)
- Assistant coaches: Chris Ducar (25th season); Damon Nahas (5th season); Heather O'Reilly (2nd season)
- Home stadium: Dorrance Field

2020 ACC women's soccer standings
	Conf.						Overall
Team	W		L		T	PCT	W		L		T	PCT
No. 2 Florida State ‍†‍‡‍^{y}	8	–	0	–	0	1.000	13	–	0	–	3	.906
No. 3 North Carolina ‍†‍‍^{y}	8	–	0	–	0	1.000	18	–	2	–	0	.900
No. 4 Virginia ‍‍‍^{y}	5	–	2	–	1	.688	14	–	4	–	3	.738
No. 6 Clemson ‍‍‍^{y}	5	–	3	–	0	.625	12	–	5	–	2	.684
No. 7 Duke ‍‍‍^{y}	4	–	2	–	2	.625	12	–	5	–	4	.667
Louisville ‍‍‍	4	–	4	–	0	.500	5	–	7	–	0	.417
Virginia Tech ‍‍‍	4	–	4	–	0	.500	8	–	9	–	0	.471
Notre Dame ‍‍‍	4	–	4	–	0	.500	6	–	7	–	0	.462
Wake Forest ‍‍‍	3	–	4	–	1	.438	5	–	7	–	2	.429
Pittsburgh ‍‍‍	3	–	5	–	0	.375	11	–	5	–	0	.688
Boston College ‍‍‍	1	–	7	–	0	.125	3	–	10	–	1	.250
Syracuse ‍‍‍	1	–	7	–	0	.125	1	–	7	–	0	.125
Miami ‍‍‍	0	–	8	–	0	.000	1	–	11	–	1	.115
NC State ‍‍‍	0	–	0	–	0	–	5	–	3	–	1	.611
† – Conference champion ‡ – 2020 ACC Tournament champion y – Invited to the NCAA Tournament; As of May 18, 2021; Rankings from United Soccer Coaches Poll; Source: The ACC; Note: † Due to COVID-19, NC State suspended the 2020 women's fall soccer season. They did participate in the spring season.

The 2020 North Carolina Tar Heels women's soccer team represented the University of North Carolina at Chapel Hill during the 2020 NCAA Division I women's soccer season. It was the 44th season of the university fielding a program. The Tar Heels were led by 44th year head coach Anson Dorrance.

Due to the COVID-19 pandemic, the ACC played a reduced schedule in 2020 and the NCAA Tournament was postponed to 2021. The ACC did not play a spring league schedule, but did allow teams to play non-conference games that would count toward their 2020 record in the lead up to the NCAA Tournament.

The Tar Heels finished the fall season 11–1–0, 8–0–0 in ACC play to finish in first place. As the second seed in the ACC Tournament, they defeated Virginia Tech, and Virginia, before losing to Florida State in the final. The Tar Heels finished the spring season 4–0 and received an at-large bid to the NCAA Tournament. As the second seed in the tournament, they defeated Denver in the Second Round, Washington in the Third Round, and Texas A&M in the Quarterfinals before losing to Santa Clara in the Semifinals to end their season.

== Previous season ==
The Tar Heels finished the season 24–2–1, 8–0–1 in ACC play to finish in first place. As the first seed in the ACC Tournament, they defeated Notre Dame, NC State, and Virginia in order to be crowned champions. They received an automatic bid to the NCAA Tournament where they defeated Belmont, Colorado, Michigan, USC, and Washington State before losing to Stanford in the Finals.

== Squad ==
=== Roster ===
Updated January 26, 2021

Note: Flags indicate national team as defined under FIFA eligibility rules; some limited exceptions apply. Players may hold more than one non-FIFA nationality.

No.	Pos.	Nation	Player
0	GK	USA	Claudia Dickey
1	FW	USA	Sam Meza
2	DF	USA	Abby Allen
4	DF	USA	Paige Tolentino
5	MF	USA	Mary Elliot McCabe
6	FW	USA	Taylor Otto
7	DF	USA	Julia Dorsey
8	MF	USA	Brianna Pinto
9	MF	USA	Rachel Dorwart
10	MF	USA	Rachel Jones
11	MF	USA	Emily Fox
12	FW	USA	Alexis Strickland
13	FW	USA	Isabel Cox
14	MF	USA	Kai Hayes
15	FW	USA	Avery Patterson
16	FW	USA	Aleigh Gambone

No.	Pos.	Nation	Player
17	GK	USA	Marz Josephson
18	MF	USA	Natalie Chandler
20	MF	USA	Libby Moore
21	MF	USA	Miah Araba
22	DF	USA	Tori Hansen
24	FW	USA	Talia DellaPeruta
25	DF	USA	Maycee Bell
26	FW	USA	Hallie Klanke
28	MF	USA	Maggie Pierce
30	DF	USA	Brooke Bingham
32	MF	USA	Madi Pry
33	MF	USA	Riley Quinlan
52	FW	USA	Izzy Brown
71	FW	USA	Mollie Baker
99	MF	USA	Laura Sparling

=== Team management ===
Position	Staff
Athletic Director	Bubba Cunningham
Head coach	Anson Dorrance
Assistant Coach	Chris Ducar
Assistant Coach	Damon Nahas
Assistant Coach	Heather O'Reilly
Director of Operations	Tom Sander

== Schedule ==
Date Time, TV	Rank^{#}	Opponent^{#}	Result	Record	Site (Attendance) City, State
Fall Regular season
September 17, 2020; 5:30 p.m., ACCNX		Wake Forest	W 4–1	1–0–0 (1–0–0)	Dorrance Field (0); Chapel Hill, NC
September 20, 2020; 11:00 a.m., ACCN		Virginia Tech	W 1–0	2–0–0 (2–0–0)	Dorrance Field (0); Chapel Hill, NC
September 27, 2020; 3:30 p.m., ACCN	No. 1	at No. 7 Duke	W 2–0	3–0–0 (3–0–0)	Koskinen Stadium (0); Durham, NC
October 1, 2020; 4:00 p.m., ACCRSN	No. 1	No. 3 Clemson	W 2–0	4–0–0 (4–0–0)	Dorrance Field (0); Chapel Hill, NC
October 15, 2020; 7:00 p.m., ACCNX	No. 1	at Syracuse	W 2–0	5–0–0 (5–0–0)	Dorrance Field (1); Chapel Hill, NC
October 18, 2020; 1:00 p.m.	No. 1	at Boston College	W 3–1	6–0–0 (6–0–0)	Newton Campus Soccer Field (0); Chestnut Hill, MA
October 23, 2020*; 7:00 p.m., ACCNX	No. 1	No. 4 Duke	W 1–0	7–0–0 (6–0–0)	Dorrance Field (0); Chapel Hill, NC
October 29, 2020; 8:00 p.m., ACCN	No. 1	at Louisville	W 3–1	8–0–0 (7–0–0)	Lynn Stadium (112); Louisville, KY
November 1, 2020; 5:30 p.m., ACCN	No. 1	No. 13 Notre Dame	W 2–0	9–0–0 (8–0–0)	Dorrance Field (0); Chapel Hill, NC
ACC Tournament
November 10, 2020; 5:30 p.m., ACCN	(2) No. 1	vs. (7) Virginia Tech; Quarterfinals	W 1–0	10–0–0	Sahlen's Stadium (217); Cary, NC
November 13, 2020; 8:00 p.m., ACCN	(2) No. 1	vs. (3) No. 9 Virginia; Semifinals	W 2–0	11–0–0	Sahlen's Stadium (307); Cary, NC
November 15, 2020; Noon, ESPNU	(2) No. 1	vs. (1) No. 2 Florida State; Finals	L 2–3	11–1–0	Sahlen's Stadium (320); Cary, NC
Spring Exhibition
March 6, 2021; Noon	No. 2	at North Carolina Courage	L 1–2	–	Sahlen's Stadium (0); Cary, NC
Spring Season
March 13, 2021; 5:30 p.m., SECN+	No. 2	at Tennessee	Postponed		Regal Stadium; Knoxville, TN
March 20, 2021; 1:00 p.m., FLO FC	No. 2	at Delaware	W 5–0	12–1–0	Grant Stadium (130); Newark, DE
March 27, 2021; 6:30 p.m., SECN+	No. 2	at Tennessee	W 7–0	13–1–0	Regal Stadium (382); Knoxville, TN
April 1, 2021; 1:00 p.m.	No. 2	at Villanova	W 1–0	14–1–0	Higgins Soccer Complex (43); Villanova, PA
April 13, 2021; 7:00 p.m., ACCNX	No. 2	Columbus State	W 6–0	15–1–0	Dorrance Field (560); Chapel Hill, NC
April 17, 2021; 1:00 p.m., ACCNX	No. 2	No. 16 South Carolina	Exhibition	–	Dorrance Field; Chapel Hill, NC
NCAA Tournament
April 30, 2021; 3:00 p.m., Youtube	(2) No. 2	vs. Denver; Second Round	W 2–0	16–1–0	Sportsplex at Matthews (327); Matthews, NC
May 5, 2021; 3:00 p.m., NCAA Livestream	(2) No. 2	vs. No. 21 Washington; Third Round	W 1–0	17–1–0	WakeMed Soccer Park (150); Cary, NC
May 9, 2021; 1:00 p.m., NCAA Livestream	(2) No. 2	vs. (7) No. 11 Texas A&M; Quarterfinals	W 1–0	18–1–0	WakeMed Soccer Park (164); Cary, NC
May 13, 2021; 8:30 p.m., ESPN2	(2) No. 2	vs. (11) No. 10 Santa Clara; Semifinals	L 1–3	18–2–0	WakeMed Soccer Park (2,166); Cary, NC
*Non-conference game. ^{#}Rankings from United Soccer Coaches. (#) Tournament seedings in parentheses.

== 2021 NWSL College Draft ==
Player	Team	Round	Pick #	Position
Emily Fox	Racing Louisville	1	1	DF
Brianna Pinto	Sky Blue	1	3	MF
Taylor Otto	Racing Louisville	2	11	MF

== Rankings ==
=== Fall 2020 ===
Ranking movement Legend: ██ Improvement in ranking. ██ Decrease in ranking. ██ Not ranked the previous week. RV=Others receiving votes.
Poll	Wk 1	Wk 2	Wk 3	Wk 4	Wk 5	Wk 6	Wk 7	Wk 8	Wk 9	Final
United Soccer	1	1	1	1	1	1	1	1	2	2

=== Spring 2021 ===
Ranking movement Legend: ██ Improvement in ranking. ██ Decrease in ranking. ██ Not ranked the previous week. RV=Others receiving votes.
Poll	Pre	Wk 1	Wk 2	Wk 3	Wk 4	Wk 5	Wk 6	Wk 7	Wk 8	Wk 9	Wk 10	Wk 11	Wk 12	Wk 13	Final
United Soccer	None Released				2 (1)	2 (2)	2	2 (1)	2 (1)	2	2	2 (2)	None Released		3 (1)
TopDrawer Soccer	2	2	2	2	2	2	2	2	2	2	2	2	2	2	4
