= 2020 ACC women's soccer tournament =

- Classification: Division I
- Teams: 8
- Matches: 7
- Attendance: 1,916 (total); 274 (average)
- Site: Sahlen's Stadium; Cary, North Carolina
- Champions: Florida State (7 title)
- Winning coach: Mark Krikorian (7 title)
- MVP: Clara Robbins (Florida State)
- Broadcast: ACCN (Quarterfinals & Semifinals), ESPNU (Final)

2020 ACC women's soccer standings
	Conf.						Overall
Team	W		L		T	PCT	W		L		T	PCT
No. 2 Florida State ‍†‍‡‍^{y}	8	–	0	–	0	1.000	13	–	0	–	3	.906
No. 3 North Carolina ‍†‍‍^{y}	8	–	0	–	0	1.000	18	–	2	–	0	.900
No. 4 Virginia ‍‍‍^{y}	5	–	2	–	1	.688	14	–	4	–	3	.738
No. 6 Clemson ‍‍‍^{y}	5	–	3	–	0	.625	12	–	5	–	2	.684
No. 7 Duke ‍‍‍^{y}	4	–	2	–	2	.625	12	–	5	–	4	.667
Louisville ‍‍‍	4	–	4	–	0	.500	5	–	7	–	0	.417
Virginia Tech ‍‍‍	4	–	4	–	0	.500	8	–	9	–	0	.471
Notre Dame ‍‍‍	4	–	4	–	0	.500	6	–	7	–	0	.462
Wake Forest ‍‍‍	3	–	4	–	1	.438	5	–	7	–	2	.429
Pittsburgh ‍‍‍	3	–	5	–	0	.375	11	–	5	–	0	.688
Boston College ‍‍‍	1	–	7	–	0	.125	3	–	10	–	1	.250
Syracuse ‍‍‍	1	–	7	–	0	.125	1	–	7	–	0	.125
Miami ‍‍‍	0	–	8	–	0	.000	1	–	11	–	1	.115
NC State ‍‍‍	0	–	0	–	0	–	5	–	3	–	1	.611
† – Conference champion ‡ – 2020 ACC Tournament champion y – Invited to the NCAA Tournament; As of May 18, 2021; Rankings from United Soccer Coaches Poll; Source: The ACC; Note: † Due to COVID-19, NC State suspended the 2020 women's fall soccer season. They did participate in the spring season.

The 2020 Atlantic Coast Conference women's soccer tournament was the 33rd edition of the ACC Women's Soccer Tournament, which decided the Atlantic Coast Conference champion. All rounds were played at Sahlen's Stadium in Cary, NC.

No. 1 seed Florida State took home their seventh ACC tournament championship, defeating No. 2 seed North Carolina.

== Background ==
The format of the tournament was announced in conjunction with all other ACC fall sports on July 29, 2020.

Due to the ongoing COVID-19 pandemic, the format of the 2020 tournament changed multiple times. Originally, the 2020 ACC Tournament was to only feature 4 teams with all matches played at Sahlen's Stadium to create an "isolation zone" (similar to the 2020 NBA Bubble) to minimize the spread of the pandemic. The semifinals were to be played on November 6, 2020, with the final was to be played on November 8, 2020.

On September 4, 2020, the format again changed, expanding the tournament from four to eight teams. The quarterfinals to be played on November 10, the semifinals on November 13, and the championship game on November 15.

== Qualification ==
The top eight teams in the Atlantic Coast Conference earned a berth into the ACC Tournament. All three tournament rounds took place at Sahlen's Stadium in Cary, North Carolina. North Carolina and Florida State finished tied for first with 8–0–0 regular season records. Florida State won the tiebreaker over North Carolina by goal differential in conference games, +21 to +16. Louisville, Virginia Tech, and Notre Dame finished in a three-way tie for sixth place, all with a 4–4–0 regular season record. The goal differential tiebreaker was applied and Notre Dame was awarded the eighth seed. Louisville and Virginia Tech were still tied after the goal differential tiebreaker. Louisville won the second tiebreaker of head-to-head record, having won their match 1–0 during the regular season.

Seed	School	Conference Record	Points
1	Florida State	8–0–0	24
2	North Carolina	8–0–0	24
3	Virginia	5–2–1	16
4	Clemson	5–3–0	15
5	Duke	4–2–2	14
6	Louisville	4–4–0	12
7	Virginia Tech	4–4–0	12
8	Notre Dame	4–4–0	12

== Bracket ==
Quarterfinals; Tuesday, November 10
1	Florida State	2
8	Notre Dame	0
4	Clemson	0
5	Duke	1
2	North Carolina	1
7	Virginia Tech	0
3	Virginia	4
6	Louisville	1

Semifinals; Friday, November 13
1	Florida State	4
5	Duke	0
2	North Carolina	2
3	Virginia	0

Final; Sunday, November 15
1	Florida State	3
2	North Carolina	2

== Schedule ==
=== Quarterfinals ===
November 10	#1 Florida State	2–0	#8 Notre Dame	Cary, North Carolina
12:30 p.m. EDT	Jaelin Howell 44'; Clara Robbins 78'	Report		Stadium: Sahlen's Stadium; Attendance: 217; Referee: Mark Buda; Assistant referees: David McPhun; Bradley Shrader; Fourth official: Carmen Serbio

November 10	#4 Clemson	0–1	#5 Duke	Cary, North Carolina
3:00 p.m. EDT	Harper White (red card) 84'	Report	Karlie Paschall 50'	Stadium: Sahlen's Stadium; Attendance: 327; Referee: Karl Kummer; Assistant referees: Marc Lawrence; Justin Howard; Fourth official: Jeremy Smith

November 10	#2 North Carolina	1–0	#7 Virginia Tech	Cary, North Carolina
5:30 p.m. EDT	Brianna Pinto (yellow card) 3', (goal) 25'	Report	Makenzie Graham (yellow card) 36'; Emmalee Carter (yellow card) 57'; Caroline Cipolla (yellow card) 83'	Stadium: Sahlen's Stadium; Attendance: 251; Referee: Sergio Gonzalez; Assistant referees: Raymond Thomas; Eric Barnes; Fourth official: Scott Bowers

November 10	#3 Virginia	4–1	#6 Louisville	Cary, North Carolina
8:00 p.m. EDT	Diana Ordoñez 19', 23', 56'; Alexa Spaanstra 70'	Report	Emina Ekic 42'	Stadium: Sahlen's Stadium; Attendance: 217; Referee: Carmen Serbio; Assistant referees: Aaron Gallagher; Kevin Uitto; Fourth official: Ryan Graves

=== Semifinals ===
November 13	#1 Florida State	4–0	#5 Duke	Cary, North Carolina
5:30 p.m. EDT	Emily Madril (yellow card) 25'; Jody Brown 30'; Jaelin Howell 59'; Kristina Lynch 64'; Jenna Nighswonger 76'	Report		Stadium: Sahlen's Stadium; Attendance: 277; Referee: John Brady; Assistant referees: Dustin Thorne; John Rush; Fourth official: Forrest Ambrose

November 13	#2 North Carolina	2–0	#3 Virginia	Cary, North Carolina
8:00 p.m. EDT	Claudia Dickey 39' (pen.); Izzy Brown (yellow card) 62'; Isabel Cox 78'; Brianna Pinto (yellow card) 79'	Report		Stadium: Sahlen's Stadium; Attendance: 307; Referee: Nikola Aleksic; Assistant referees: Jeremy Smith; Daniel Kappler; Fourth official: Hudson Owens

=== Final ===
November 15	#1 Florida State	3–2	#2 North Carolina	Cary, North Carolina
Noon EDT	Clara Robbins 1', 5'; LeiLanni Nesbeth 46'	Report	Talia DellaPeruta (yellow card) 57'; Rachel Jones 58' (pen.); Izzy Brown (yellow card) 67'; Brianna Pinto 88'	Stadium: Sahlen's Stadium; Attendance: 320; Referee: Nicholas Balcer; Assistant referees: Robert Dail; Jude Carr; Fourth official: Justin Frear

== Statistics ==
=== Goalscorers ===
There were 20 goals scored in 7 matches, for an average of 2.86 goals per match.

3 goals

- Diana Ordóñez – Virginia
- Clara Robbins – Florida State

2 goals

- Jaelin Howell – Florida State
- Brianna Pinto – North Carolina

1 goal

- Jody Brown – Florida State
- Isabel Cox – North Carolina
- Claudia Dickey – North Carolina
- Emina Ekic – Louisville
- Rachel Jones – North Carolina
- Kristina Lynch – Florida State
- Leilanni Nesbeth – Florida State
- Jenna Nighswonger – Florida State
- Karlie Paschall – Duke
- Alexa Spaanstra – Virginia

== All Tournament Team ==
Player	Team
**Clara Robbins**	Florida State
Jaelin Howell	Florida State
Jenna Nighswonger	Florida State
Malia Berkely	Florida State
Cristina Roque	Florida State
Claudia Dickey	North Carolina
Brianna Pinto	North Carolina
Emily Fox	North Carolina
Sophie Jones	Duke
Diana Ordoñez	Virginia
Alexa Spaanstra	Virginia

MVP in bold

== See also ==
- Atlantic Coast Conference
- 2020 Atlantic Coast Conference women's soccer season
- 2020 NCAA Division I women's soccer season
