= 2020 Atlantic Coast Conference women's soccer season =

- League: NCAA Division I
- Sport: Soccer
- Duration: September 2020 – November 2020
- Teams: 13

2021 NWSL Draft
- Top draft pick: Emily Fox
- Picked by: Racing Louisville FC, 1st overall

Regular season
- Season champions: North Carolina & Florida State
- Runners-up: Virginia
- Season MVP: Offensive: Emina Ekic; Midfielder: Jaelin Howell; Defensive: Malia Berkely
- Top scorer: Brianna Pinto – North Carolina

Tournament
- Champions: Florida State
- Runners-up: North Carolina
- Finals MVP: Clara Robbins – Florida State

ACC women's soccer seasons
- ← 2019 2021 →

2020 ACC women's soccer standings
	Conf.						Overall
Team	W		L		T	PCT	W		L		T	PCT
No. 2 Florida State ‍†‍‡‍^{y}	8	–	0	–	0	1.000	13	–	0	–	3	.906
No. 3 North Carolina ‍†‍‍^{y}	8	–	0	–	0	1.000	18	–	2	–	0	.900
No. 4 Virginia ‍‍‍^{y}	5	–	2	–	1	.688	14	–	4	–	3	.738
No. 6 Clemson ‍‍‍^{y}	5	–	3	–	0	.625	12	–	5	–	2	.684
No. 7 Duke ‍‍‍^{y}	4	–	2	–	2	.625	12	–	5	–	4	.667
Louisville ‍‍‍	4	–	4	–	0	.500	5	–	7	–	0	.417
Virginia Tech ‍‍‍	4	–	4	–	0	.500	8	–	9	–	0	.471
Notre Dame ‍‍‍	4	–	4	–	0	.500	6	–	7	–	0	.462
Wake Forest ‍‍‍	3	–	4	–	1	.438	5	–	7	–	2	.429
Pittsburgh ‍‍‍	3	–	5	–	0	.375	11	–	5	–	0	.688
Boston College ‍‍‍	1	–	7	–	0	.125	3	–	10	–	1	.250
Syracuse ‍‍‍	1	–	7	–	0	.125	1	–	7	–	0	.125
Miami ‍‍‍	0	–	8	–	0	.000	1	–	11	–	1	.115
NC State ‍‍‍	0	–	0	–	0	–	5	–	3	–	1	.611
† – Conference champion ‡ – 2020 ACC Tournament champion y – Invited to the NCAA Tournament; As of May 18, 2021; Rankings from United Soccer Coaches Poll; Source: The ACC; Note: † Due to COVID-19, NC State suspended the 2020 women's fall soccer season. They did participate in the spring season.

The 2020 Atlantic Coast Conference women's soccer season was the 32nd season of women's varsity soccer in the conference.

Florida State and North Carolina shared the regular season title. The Seminoles won the 2020 ACC tournament over the Tar Heels, 3–2.

== Teams ==
=== Stadiums and locations ===
Team	Stadium	Capacity
Boston College Eagles	Newton Soccer Complex	2,500
Clemson Tigers	Riggs Field	6,500
Duke Blue Devils	Koskinen Stadium	7,000
Florida State Seminoles	Seminole Soccer Complex	1,600
Louisville Cardinals	Lynn Stadium	5,300
Miami Hurricanes	Cobb Stadium	500
North Carolina Tar Heels	Dorrance Field	5,025
Notre Dame Fighting Irish	Alumni Stadium	2,500
Pittsburgh Panthers	Ambrose Urbanic Field	735
Syracuse Orange	SU Soccer Stadium	5,000
Virginia Cavaliers	Klöckner Stadium	8,000
Virginia Tech Hokies	Thompson Field	2,500
Wake Forest Demon Deacons	Spry Stadium	3,000

1. Georgia Tech does not sponsor women's soccer
2. NC State decided to opt out of the 2020 season.

== Coaches ==
=== Head coaching records ===
Team	Head coach	Years at school	Overall record	Record at school	ACC record
Boston College	Jason Lowe	2	8–8–2	8–8–2	1–8–1
Clemson	Eddie Radwanski	10	232–125–35	93–60–22	39–46–8
Duke	Robbie Church	20	331–175–66	244–126–55	93–59–31
Florida State	Mark Krikorian	16	351–96–33	276–66–30	103–32–25
Louisville	Karen Ferguson-Dayes	20	182–161–37	182–161–37	23–27–10
Miami	Sarah Barnes	3	71–59–19	11–18–5	5–13–2
North Carolina	Anson Dorrance	42	833–68–38	833–68–38	200–26–10
NC State	Tim Santoro	8	62–70–14	62–70–14	19–46–8
Notre Dame	Nate Norman	3	77–53–16	19–18–2	8–10–2
Pittsburgh	Randy Waldrum	3	408–130–33	9–22–4	9–21–2
Syracuse	Nicky Adams	2	90–66–25	3–11–2	1–7–1
Virginia	Steve Swanson	20	419–157–59	315–94–48	125–44–20
Virginia Tech	Charles Adair	10	118–53–20	118–53–20	42–39–13
Wake Forest	Tony da Luz	23	308–214–50	263-173-48	87–102–22

Notes

- Records shown are prior to the 2020 season
- Years at school includes the 2020 season

== Pre-season ==
=== Impact of the COVID-19 pandemic on the season ===
On September 4, 2020, the Atlantic Coast Conference announced the fall Olympic sports schedule, which included the schedule for women's soccer. The men's soccer season will begin in September, 2020 instead of the originally planned August, and conclude on November 1. The season will culminate with the 2020 ACC Women's Soccer tournament, which will have the usual eight teams, but all games will be played at WakeMed Soccer Park in Cary, North Carolina.

On January 26, 2021, the Atlantic Coast Conference announced that no league matches will be played in the spring. However, teams were permitted to play non-conference matches, that will count toward their overall records. The winner of the 2020 ACC Women's Soccer tournament, Florida State, would receive the conference's automatic bid to the NCAA tournament.

=== Hermann Trophy Watchlist ===
Due to the ongoing COVID-19 pandemic, a preseason MAC Hermann Trophy watch list was released in January instead of August. Eight players from ACC schools were named to the watchlist.

Player	Class	Position	School
Maycee Bell	Sophomore	DF	North Carolina
Emina Ekic	Senior	MF	Louisville
Jaelin Howell	Junior	MF	Florida State
Rachel Jones	Junior	FW	North Carolina
Sophie Jones	Sophomore	MF	Duke
Brianna Pinto	Junior	MF	North Carolina
Alexa Spaanstra	Junior	FW	Virginia
Yujie Zhao	Junior	MF	Florida State

=== Pre-season poll ===
The 2020 ACC Preseason Poll was announced on September 8, 2020. The defending regular season champions, North Carolina were voted to repeat their regular season crown. Florida State was voted in second place. The leagues 14 head coaches also voted on a preseason All-ACC team. Full results for the coaches poll and preseason team are shown below.

==== Pre-season Coaches Poll ====
Predicted finish	Team	Points (1st place)
1	North Carolina	129 (8)
2	Florida State	123 (3)
3	Virginia	113 (2)
4	Duke	98
5	Clemson	86
6	Notre Dame	79
7	Louisville	77
8	Virginia Tech	64
9	Wake Forest	50
10	Pittsburgh	42
11	Boston College	35
12	Miami	27
13	Syracuse	13

==== Pre-season All-ACC Team ====
Position	Player	Class	School
Goalkeeper	Gabby Kouzelos	Senior	Louisville
Defender	Delaney Graham	Junior	Duke
Defender	Emily Fox	Senior	North Carolina
Defender	Malia Berkely	Senior	Florida State
Defender	Maycee Bell	Sophomore	North Carolina
Midfielder	Jaelin Howell	Junior	Florida State
Midfielder	Yujie Zhao	Junior	Florida State
Midfielder	Emina Ekic	Senior	Louisville
Midfielder	Brianna Pinto	Junior	North Carolina
Forward	Diana Ordoñez	Sophomore	Virginia
Forward	Alexa Spaanstra	Junior	Virginia

== Regular season ==
=== Conference matrix ===
The table below shows head-to-head results between teams in conference play. Each team plays seven matches. Each team does not play every other team.

	Boston College	Clemson	Duke	Florida State	Louisville	Miami	North Carolina	Notre Dame	Pittsburgh	Syracuse	Virginia	Virginia Tech	Wake Forest
vs. Boston College	–	–	1–0	–	2–0	–	3–1	2–0	4–3	1–3	2–1	3–0	–
vs. Clemson	–	–	1–0	2–0	–	–	2–0	1–2	1–2 (OT)	–	0–3	0–3	0–2
vs. Duke	0–1	0–1	–	1–0	–	1–3	2–0	–	–	0–4	1–1 (2OT)	–	0–0 (2OT)
vs. Florida State	–	0–2	0–1	–	0–1	–	–	0–5	1–4	–	3–4	0–4	0–4
vs. Louisville	0–2	–	–	1–0	–	0–3	3–1	1–0	–	0–3	2–0	0–1	–
vs. Miami	–	–	3–1	–	3–0	–	–	6–0	2–0	1–0	3–0	8–2	1–0
vs. North Carolina	1–3	0–2	0–2	–	1–3	–	–	0–2	–	0–2	–	0–1	1–4
vs. Notre Dame	0–2	2–1	–	5–0	0–1	0–6	2–0	–	–	0–2	–	–	1–0
vs. Pittsburgh	3–4	2–1 (OT)	–	4–1	–	0–2	–	–	–	0–2	2–1 (OT)	2–0	1–0
vs. Syracuse	3–1	–	4–0	–	3–0	0–1	2–0	2–0	2–0	–	5–3	–	–
vs. Virginia	1–2	3–0	1–1 (2OT)	4–3	0–2	0–3	–	–	1–2 (OT)	3–5	–	–	–
vs. Virginia Tech	0–3	3–0	–	4–0	1–0	2–8	1–0	–	0–2	–	–	–	3–4
vs. Wake Forest	–	2–0	0–0 (2OT)	4–0	–	0–1	4–1	0–1	0–1	–	–	4–3	–
Total	1–7–0	5–3–0	4–2–2	8–0–0	4–4–0	0–8–0	8–0–0	4–4–0	3–5–0	1–7–0	5–2–1	4–4–0	3–4–1

=== Rankings ===
==== Fall 2020 ====
===== United Soccer =====
Legend
Increase in ranking
Decrease in ranking
Not ranked previous week

	Wk 1	Wk 2	Wk 3	Wk 4	Wk 5	Wk 6	Wk 7	Wk 8	Wk 9	Final
Boston College										
Clemson	3	3	6	4	3	3	5	5	7	6
Duke	7	11	7	5	4	5	6	6	5	5
Florida State	2	2	2	2	2	2	2	2	1	1
Louisville			13	13	13					
Miami										
North Carolina	1	1	1	1	1	1	1	1	2	2
NC State										
Notre Dame			14	14		13	14	12	13	14
Pittsburgh	12	14								
Syracuse										
Virginia	11	10	10	11	10	10	10	9	9	10
Virginia Tech										
Wake Forest										

==== Spring 2021 ====
===== United Soccer =====
Legend
Increase in ranking
Decrease in ranking
Not ranked previous week

	Pre	Wk 2	Wk 3	Wk 4	Wk 5	Wk 6	Wk 7	Wk 8	Final
Boston College									
Clemson	9	8	8	8	8	8	6	6	6
Duke	5	5	5	5	7	7	9	8	7
Florida State	1 (28)	1 (31)	1 (33)	1 (30)	1 (31)	1 (33)	1 (32)	1 (28)	2 (1)
Louisville									
Miami									
North Carolina	2 (1)	2 (2)	2	2 (1)	2 (1)	2	2	2 (2)	3 (1)
NC State									
Notre Dame	RV	RV							
Pittsburgh									
Syracuse									
Virginia	8	9	9	10	10	12	12	13	4 (1)
Virginia Tech	RV	RV							
Wake Forest									

===== Top Drawer Soccer =====
Legend
Increase in ranking
Decrease in ranking
Not ranked previous week

	Pre	Wk 1	Wk 2	Wk 3	Wk 4	Wk 5	Wk 6	Wk 7	Wk 8	Wk 9	Wk 10	Wk 11	Wk 12	Wk 13	Final
Boston College															
Clemson	17	17	17	16	12	11	11	11	11	11	9	9	8	8	8
Duke	11	11	11	11	9	8	8	7	7	7	7	7	6	6	6
Florida State	1	1	1	1	1	1	1	1	1	1	1	1	1	1	2
Louisville															
Miami															
North Carolina	2	2	2	2	2	2	2	2	2	2	2	2	2	2	4
NC State															
Notre Dame															
Pittsburgh															
Syracuse															
Virginia	6	6	6	6	5	5	5	5	3	6	5	5	4	3	3
Virginia Tech															
Wake Forest															

=== Players of the Week ===
==== Fall ====
Week	Offensive Player of the week	Defensive Player of the week	Reference
Week 1 – September 15	Marykate McGuire, Duke	Kate McKay, Pittsburgh	
Week 2 – September 22	Caroline Conti, Clemson	Hensley Hancuff, Clemson	
Week 3 – September 29	Izzy Brown, North Carolina	Maycee Bell, North Carolina	
Week 3 – September 29	Izzy Brown, North Carolina	Claire Constant, Virginia	
Week 4 – October 6	Emina Ekic, Louisville	Alia Skinner, Virginia Tech	
Week 5 – October 13	Amanda West, Pittsburgh	Caitlin Cosme, Duke	
Week 6 – October 20	Clara Robbins, Florida State	Kaitlyn Parks, Wake Forest	
Week 6 – October 20	Alexa Spaanstra, Virginia	Kaitlyn Parks, Wake Forest	
Week 7 – October 27	Jenna Bike, Boston College	Mattie Interian, Notre Dame	
Week 7 – October 27	Emily Gray, Virginia Tech	Mattie Interian, Notre Dame	
Week 8 – November 3	Tori Powell, Virginia Tech	Cristina Roque, Florida State	

==== Spring ====
Week	Offensive Player of the week	Defensive Player of the week	Reference
Week 1 – March 3	Caroline Conti, Clemson	Talia Staude, Virginia	
Week 2 – March 9	Landy Mertz, Pittsburgh	Caitlin Cosme, Duke	
Week 3 – March 16	Selena Fortich, Miami	Melissa Dagenais, Miami	
Week 4 – March 23	Maliah Morris, Clemson	Kaitlyn Parks, Wake Forest	
Week 5 – March 30	Brianna Pinto, North Carolina	Kaitlyn Parks (2), Wake Forest	
Week 6 – April 6	Amanda West, Pittsburgh	Mia Gyau, Duke	
Week 7 – April 13	Megan Bornkamp, Clemson	Ruthie Jones, Duke	
Week 8 – April 20	Toni Starova, NC State	Maria Echezarreta, NC State	

== Postseason ==
=== ACC Tournament ===
Semifinals
1	Florida State	4
5	Duke	0
2	North Carolina	2
3	Virginia	0

Final
1	Florida State	3
2	North Carolina	2

=== NCAA tournament ===
Seed	School	1st Round	2nd Round	3rd Round	Quarterfinals	Semifinals	Championship
1	Florida State	BYE	W 3–0 vs. Milwaukee - (WakeMed Soccer Park)	W 3–1 vs. Penn State - (WakeMed Soccer Park)	T 0–0 (5–3 PKs) vs. No. 9 Duke - (WakeMed Soccer Park)	T 0–0 (3–0 PKs) vs. Virginia - (WakeMed Soccer Park)	T 1–1 (1–4 PKs) vs. No. 11 Santa Clara - (WakeMed Soccer Park)
2	North Carolina	BYE	W 2–0 vs. Denver - (Sportsplex at Matthews)	W 1–0 vs. Washington - (WakeMed Soccer Park)	W 1–0 vs. No. 7 Texas A&M - (WakeMed Soccer Park)	L 1–3 vs. No. 11 Santa Clara - (WakeMed Soccer Park)	
9	Duke	BYE	W 2–1 (2OT) vs. Arizona State - (Johnson Stadium)	W 1–0 vs. Ole Miss - (WakeMed Soccer Park)	T 0–0 (3–5 PKs) vs. No. 1 Florida State - (WakeMed Soccer Park)		
14	Clemson	BYE	T 1–1 (5–4 PKs) vs. Rutgers - (Eakes Athletics Complex)	T 1–1 (6–5 PKs) vs. No. 3 UCLA – (WakeMed Soccer Park)	L 0–1 vs. No. 11 Santa Clara - (WakeMed Soccer Park)		
	Virginia	W 3–1 vs. SIU Edwardsville – (WakeMed Soccer Park)	W 2–0 vs. No. 12 BYU – (WakeMed Soccer Park)	W 3–0 vs. Rice – (WakeMed Soccer Park)	W 1–0 vs. No. 4 TCU – (WakeMed Soccer Park)	T 0–0 (0–3 PKs)vs. No. 1 Florida State – (WakeMed Soccer Park)	
	W–L (%):	1–0–0 (1.000)	4–0–1 (.900)	4–0–1 (.900)	2–1–2 (.600)	0–1–2 (.333)	0–0–1 (.500) Total: 11–2–7 (.725)

== Awards and honors ==
=== ACC Awards ===
2020 ACC Women's Soccer Individual Awards
Award	Recipient(s)
Offensive Player of the Year	Emina Ekic – Louisville
Coach of the Year	Mark Krikorian – Florida State
Defensive Player of the Year	Malia Berkely – Florida State
Midfielder of the Year	Jaelin Howell – Florida State
Freshman of the Year	Lia Godfrey – Virginia

2020 ACC Women's Soccer All-Conference Teams
First Team	Second Team	Third Team	All-Freshman Team
Sophie Jones, So., M, Duke; Malia Berkely, Sr., D, Florida State; Jaelin Howell, Jr., M, Florida State; Yujie Zhao, Jr., M, Florida State; Emina Ekic, Sr., M, Louisville; Maycee Bell, So., D, North Carolina; Claudia Dickey, Jr., GK, North Carolina; Emily Fox, Sr., D, North Carolina; Rachel Jones, Jr., F, North Carolina; Brianna Pinto, Jr., M, North Carolina; Alexa Spaanstra, Jr., F, Virginia	Makenna Morris, Fr., D, Clemson; Mariana Speckmaier, Sr., F, Clemson; Emily Madril, Jr., D, Florida State; Clara Robbins, Jr., M, Florida State; Cristina Roque, Fr., GK, Florida State; Taylor Otto, Sr., M, North Carolina; Sammi Fisher, Sr., M, Notre Dame; Amanda West, So., F, Pittsburgh; Lia Godfrey, Fr., M, Virginia; Rebecca Jarrett, Jr., F, Virginia; Diana Ordóñez, So., F, Virginia	Megan Bornkamp, Fr., D, Clemson; Hal Hershfelt, So., M, Clemson; Courtney Jones, Jr., M, Clemson; Delaney Graham, Jr., D, Duke; Taylor Mitchell, Sr., D, Duke; Jenna Nighswonger, So., M, Florida State; Gabby Kouzelos, Sr., GK, Louisville; Sam Meza, Fr., M, North Carolina; Kiki Van Zanten, So., F, Notre Dame; Emily Gray, Jr., M, Virginia Tech; Hannah Betfort, Sr., D, Wake Forest	Megan Bornkamp, D, Clemson; Makenna Morris, D, Clemson; Jody Brown, F, Florida State; Cristina Roque, GK, Florida State; Kaitlyn Zipay, F, Florida State; Talia DellaPeruta, F, North Carolina; Sam Meza, M, North Carolina; Lia Godfrey, M, Virginia; Samar Guidry, D, Virginia; Tori Powell, F, Virginia Tech; Sophie Faircloth, D, Wake Forest

== 2021 NWSL Draft ==
FW	Forward	MF	Midfielder	DF	Defender	GK	Goalkeeper

Player	Team	Round	Pick #	Position	School
Emily Fox	Racing Louisville	1	1	D	North Carolina
Brianna Pinto	Sky Blue	1	3	M	North Carolina
Emina Ekic	Racing Louisville	1	5	M	Louisville
Taylor Otto	Racing Louisville	2	11	M	North Carolina
Taryn Torres	Sky Blue FC	3	23	M	Virginia
Alissa Gorzak	Chicago Red Stars	4	35	F	Virginia
Mariana Speckmaier	Washington Spirit	4	39	F	Clemson
Tess Boade	Sky Blue FC	4	40	F	Duke
