= Alexa Spaanstra =

American soccer player (born 2000)

- Spaanstra with the Utah Royals in 2026

Personal information
- Full name: Alexa Christine Spaanstra
- Date of birth: February 1, 2000 (age 26)
- Place of birth: Brighton, Michigan, U.S.
- Height: 5 ft 4 in (1.63 m)
- Positions: Winger; right back

Team information
- Current team: Utah Royals
- Number: 30

Youth career
- Michigan Hawks

College career
Years	Team	Apps	(Gls)
2018–2022	Virginia Cavaliers	107	(37)

Senior career*
Years	Team	Apps	(Gls)
2023–2024	Kansas City Current	26	(3)
2024–2026	Portland Thorns	25	(0)
2026	→ Utah Royals (loan)	12	(0)
2026–	Utah Royals	6	(0)

International career
2016	United States U-17	3	(0)
2017	United States U-19	3	(2)
2018–2020	United States U-20	17	(2)
- * Club domestic league appearances and goals as of 04:26, November 10, 2026 (UTC)

Alexa Christine Spaanstra (born February 1, 2000) is an American professional soccer player who plays as a winger or right back for the Utah Royals of the National Women's Soccer League (NWSL). She played college soccer for the Virginia Cavaliers, where she was a five-time All-ACC selection. She was drafted by the Kansas City Current in the first round of the 2023 NWSL Draft and has also played for the Portland Thorns. Internationally, she played for the United States youth national team, winning CONCACAF tournaments at the under-17 and under-20 levels.

== Early life ==
Spaanstra was born and raised in Brighton, Michigan, the older of two children born to Andrea and Scott Spaanstra. Her father played college basketball for the Northern Michigan Wildcats, and her mother ran track at Aquinas College. Spaanstra joined the Michigan Hawks at the under-11 level, helping the team win ECNL national titles in 2014 and 2017 and finish runners-up in the years between. She was also a competitive sprinter, winning a national 200-meter dash at age 10 and lettering in track at Brighton High School. She was ranked by TopDrawerSoccer as the No. 7 recruit of the class of 2018.

== College career ==
Spaanstra was a five-year starter at forward and midfield for the Virginia Cavaliers from 2018 to 2022. She helped Virginia win the Atlantic Coast Conference (ACC) regular season title in 2021 and reach the finals of the ACC tournament in 2019 and 2021, earning all-tournament honors in each of her first four seasons. As a freshman in 2018, she recorded nine goals and six assists, both joint team bests, and was named All-ACC third team and ACC All-Freshman.

Spaanstra had three goals and a team-best twelve assists as a sophomore in 2019, including four assists in one game and two against Florida State in the ACC semifinals, and was second-team All-ACC. After missing about a month due to injury, she made the All-ACC first team with ten goals as a junior in 2020–21, including four goals in the first two rounds of the 2020 NCAA tournament as the Cavaliers reached the semifinals. She recorded seven goals and nine assists as a senior in 2021, helping Virginia take the ACC regular season title, and was named second-team All-ACC. She finished her fifth season of eligibility with eight goals and was third-team All-ACC in 2022.

== Club career ==
=== Kansas City Current ===
The Kansas City Current selected Spaanstra tenth overall in the first round of the 2023 NWSL Draft. She was signed to a two-year rookie contract. On March 23, she made her professional debut in the season opener, starting in a 1–0 loss to the North Carolina Courage. On October 7, she scored her first professional goal as the Current won 6–3 over the Chicago Red Stars. She scored again the following week as the season ended with a 2–2 draw to NJ/NY Gotham FC and was recognized for her performances as the NWSL Rookie of the Month for September/October 2023. She finished her rookie season with 21 appearances and 2 goals in all competitions.

Spaanstra began the following season (2024) playing in a 5–4 win over the Portland Thorns as the Current inaugurated CPKC Stadium on March 16, 2024. Two weeks later, she scored her first goal of the season in a 4–2 win over Angel City FC. She played in the 2024 NWSL x Liga MX Femenil Summer Cup, which Kansas City won. Through the summer break, she made 15 appearances and scored 1 goal in all competitions.

=== Portland Thorns ===
On August 19, 2024, Spaanstra was traded to Portland Thorns FC for $25,000 in intraleague transfer funds and $15,000 in allocation money. She debuted for the club the following week in a 2–0 loss to Gotham FC. On October 15, the day after signing a new contract with the Thorns through 2026, she scored her first goal for the club in a 6–0 win over Vancouver Whitecaps Girls Elite, clinching a place in the CONCACAF W Champions Cup semifinals. She finished the season with 12 appearances and 1 goal in all competitions, losing 2–1 to Gotham FC in the playoff quarterfinals.

The following season, Spaanstra made 20 appearances and scored 0 goals in all competitions. On October 19, 2025, Spaanstra assisted the opening goal by Olivia Moultrie in a playoff-clinching 2–0 win over Angel City FC. She started both playoff matches as the Thorns won 1–0 over the San Diego Wave in the quarterfinals, then lost 2–0 to the Washington Spirit in the semifinals.

=== Utah Royals ===
On March 22, 2026, Spaanstra was loaned out to the Utah Royals through June. She made her debut later that day in a 2–1 loss to the San Diego Wave. On July 24, the Royals announced that the club had made the move permanent for $25,000 in intraleague transfer funds with potential add-ons worth $7,500.

== International career ==
Spaanstra trained with the United States youth national team beginning at the under-14 level in May 2013. She was called up to the national under-17 team in August 2014 to play friendlies in South Korea and trained with both the under-17 and under-20 teams in August 2015, aged 15. She helped the United States win the 2016 CONCACAF Women's U-17 Championship and competed at the 2016 FIFA U-17 Women's World Cup. She led the national under-19 team to win a tournament in China in September 2017 and was recognized as the tournament's most valuable player. While in college, she competed at the 2018 FIFA U-20 Women's World Cup and won the 2020 CONCACAF Women's U-20 Championship. She first played with the national under-23 team at an NWSL preseason tournament in February 2022.

== Career statistics ==
As of December 31, 2025

Appearances and goals by club, season and competition
Club	Season	League			Cup (Note: Includes the NWSL Challenge Cup)		Playoffs (Note: Includes NWSL Playoffs)		Continental (Note: Includes CONCACAF W Champions Cup)		Other		Total	
Club	Season	Division	Apps	Goals	Apps	Goals	Apps	Goals	Apps	Goals	Apps	Goals	Apps	Goals
Kansas City Current	2023	NWSL	15	2	6	0	—		—		—		21	2
Kansas City Current	2024	NWSL	11	1	—		—		—		4 (Note: Includes NWSL x Liga MX Femenil Summer Cup)	0	15	1
Kansas City Current	Total		26	3	6	0	0	0	0	0	4	0	36	3
Portland Thorns FC	2024	NWSL	8	0	—		1	0	3	1	0	0	12	1
Portland Thorns FC	2025	NWSL	16	0	—		2	0	0	0	—		18	0
Portland Thorns FC	Total		24	0	0	0	3	0	3	1	0	0	30	1
Utah Royals FC	2026	NWSL	—	—	—	—	—	—	—	—	—	—	—	—
Career total			50	3	6	0	3	0	3	1	4	0	66	4

== Honors and awards ==
=== International ===
- United States U-17: CONCACAF Women's U-17 Championship: 2016
- United States U-20: CONCACAF Women's U-20 Championship: 2020

=== Club ===
- FC Kansas City: 2024 NWSL x Liga MX Femenil Summer Cup

=== College ===
- Virginia Cavaliers: Atlantic Coast Conference: 2021

=== Individual ===
- First-team All-ACC: 2020
- Second-team All-ACC: 2019, 2021
- Third-team All-ACC: 2018, 2022
- NCAA tournament top scorer: 2020
- ACC tournament all-tournament team: 2018, 2019, 2020, 2021
