= Maycee Bell =

American soccer player (born 2000)

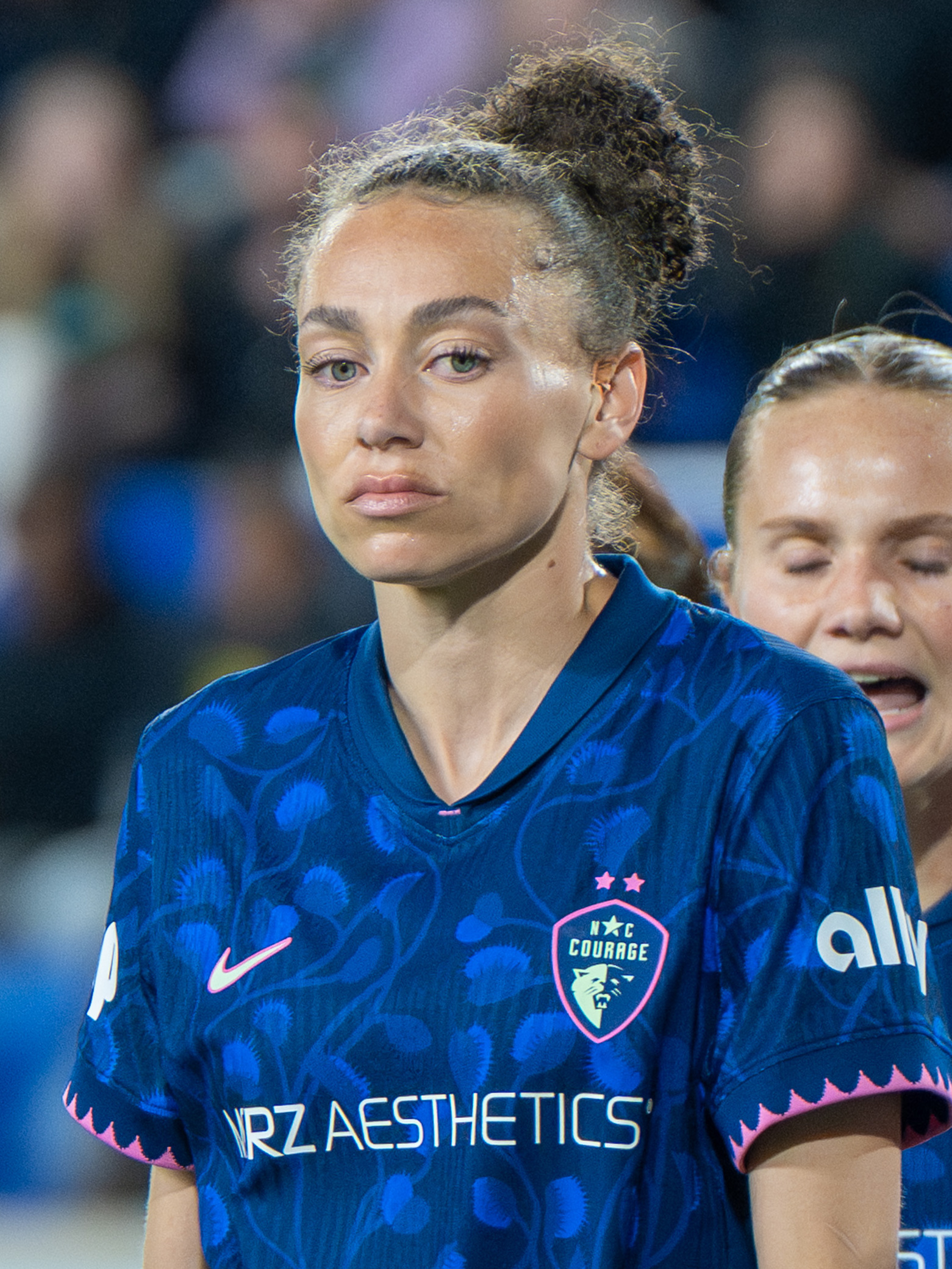
- Bell with the North Carolina Courage in 2026

Personal information
- Full name: Maycee Nicole Bell
- Date of birth: September 18, 2000 (age 26)
- Place of birth: Wichita, Kansas, U.S.
- Height: 5 ft 11 in (1.80 m)
- Position: Center back

Team information
- Current team: North Carolina Courage
- Number: 27

Youth career
- Sporting Blue Valley

College career
Years	Team	Apps	(Gls)
2019–2023	North Carolina Tar Heels	77	(7)

Senior career*
Years	Team	Apps	(Gls)
2024	NJ/NY Gotham FC	8	(1)
2024–	North Carolina Courage	42	(0)

International career
2017–2018	United States U-19	2	(0)
2018–2020	United States U-20	8	(1)
- * Club domestic league appearances and goals as of 06:50, November 8, 2026 (UTC)

Maycee Nicole Bell (born September 18, 2000) is an American professional soccer player who plays as a center back for the North Carolina Courage of the National Women's Soccer League (NWSL). She played college soccer for the North Carolina Tar Heels, earning All-American honors twice. She was drafted by NJ/NY Gotham FC in the first round of the 2024 NWSL Draft, then traded to the Courage during her rookie year. She represented the United States at the youth international level.

== Early life ==
Bell was born in Wichita, Kansas, to former college basketball players Brett and Kristy Bell, and has five younger siblings. She began playing soccer as a forward but was converted to center back at her first youth national team training camp in 2014. She said she "realized I loved stopping people from scoring more than I actually loved scoring" and modeled her game partly after national team defender Becky Sauerbrunn.

Bell played one year of high school soccer as a freshman at Trinity Academy, scoring 19 goals at forward in 14 games, and was named Kansas's Gatorade Player of the Year for 2015–16. She moved to the Kansas City area to play year-round with ECNL club Sporting Blue Valley, which she captained from 2014 to 2017, and attended Blue Valley Southwest, Blue Valley West, and Insight School of Kansas. Bell moved to North Carolina in her senior year to play for the North Carolina Courage Academy and would train with the Courage first team during her college off-seasons.

== College career ==
Bell started for the North Carolina Tar Heels from her first week in 2019, when she was named the Atlantic Coast Conference (ACC) Defensive Player of the Week. She scored a career-high three goals as a freshman, including one in the ACC tournament final and one during the NCAA tournament, where the team finished runners-up. She was named ACC Freshman of the Year, second-team All-ACC, and third-team All-American. She was named to the All-ACC first team for fall 2020, and she recovered from ankle surgery to return in the quarterfinals of the NCAA tournament that spring.

Bell was named first-team All-ACC and second-team All-American as a junior in 2021, though she injured her left ankle in the pensultimate regular-season game. She sat out the following season after tearing her meniscus in the first game of 2022. She returned for a fifth year to co-captain North Carolina as a redshirt senior and was named to the All-ACC second team in 2023.

== Club career ==
=== Gotham FC ===
Reigning NWSL champions NJ/NY Gotham FC selected Bell with the 14th overall pick in the first round of the 2024 NWSL Draft, their sole pick of the night. She was signed to a three-year contract. On March 15, she made her professional debut as a substitute in the NWSL Challenge Cup, a 1–0 loss to the San Diego Wave. She made her first regular-season appearance on April 20, coming in for Bruninha in a 2–1 away defeat to the Washington Spirit. She earned her first start on May 8, taking Bruninha's place in a 1–0 win against the Houston Dash. On June 19, she scored her first professional goal in late stoppage time against the San Diego Wave, finishing off Jenna Nighswonger's cross to secure a 2–1 victory. She started four games in the NWSL x Liga MX Femenil Summer Cup, helping Gotham advance to the final. In half a season with Gotham, she made 13 appearances (7 starts) and scored 1 goal in all competitions.

=== North Carolina Courage ===
On August 21, 2024, Gotham FC traded Bell to the North Carolina Courage for $80,000 in allocation money and $10,000 in intra-league transfer funds. She debuted for her former youth club on September 8, substituting late for Felicitas Rauch in a 4–1 win against the San Diego Wave.

Bell made her first start for the Courage on March 22, 2025, playing left back in the home-opening 2–1 loss to the Seattle Reign. On April 13, she made her first Courage start at center back after Malia Berkely was a late scratch against Gotham FC. North Carolina head coach Sean Nahas, who had coached her with the Courage Academy, subsequently trusted her as a regular starter. On May 3, she won all eight duels and three tackles during a 2–0 win over the Utah Royals, becoming the first NWSL player in five years to go 100% in those statistics on that many attempts. She finished the season with 24 appearances, starting 21, as the Courage placed ninth and missed the playoffs. On December 5, the Courage announced that they had signed Bell to a contract extension through 2028.

== International career ==
Bell trained with the United States youth national team beginning at the under-16 level in 2014. She scored for the under-20 team in a friendly in March 2019 and recorded an assist at the 2020 CONCACAF Women's U-20 Championship, which the United States won. She received her first call-up with the senior national team in December 2019 but had to miss the camp due to injury.

== Honors and awards ==
North Carolina Tar Heels

- Atlantic Coast Conference: 2019, 2020, 2022
- ACC tournament: 2019

Individual

- Second-team All-American: 2021
- Third-team All-American: 2019
- First-team All-ACC: 2020, 2021
- Second-team All-ACC: 2019, 2023
- ACC Freshman of the Year: 2019
- ACC tournament all-tournament team: 2019
