= Brianna Pinto =

American soccer player (born 2000)

- Pinto with the Chicago Stars in 2026

Personal information
- Full name: Brianna Alexis Smalls Pinto
- Date of birth: May 24, 2000 (age 26)
- Place of birth: New Haven, Connecticut, United States
- Height: 5 ft 5 in (1.65 m)
- Positions: Midfielder; forward

Team information
- Current team: Chicago Stars
- Number: 10

Youth career
- Triangle United
- Triangle Futbol Club
- 2014–17: CASL ECNL
- 2018: NTH Tophat

College career
Years	Team	Apps	(Gls)
2018–2021	North Carolina Tar Heels	65	(23)

Senior career*
Years	Team	Apps	(Gls)
2021	NJ/NY Gotham FC	10	(0)
2022–2025	North Carolina Courage	71	(8)
2026–	Chicago Stars	25	(0)

International career^{‡}
2015–2016	United States U-17	3	(0)
2017–2020	United States U-20	29	(12)
- * Club domestic league appearances and goals as of 05:45, November 2, 2026 (UTC) ‡ National team caps and goals as of April 16, 2021

Brianna Alexis Smalls Pinto (born May 24, 2000) is an American professional soccer player who plays as a midfielder or forward for Chicago Stars FC of the National Women's Soccer League (NWSL).

Raised in Durham, North Carolina, Pinto played college soccer for the North Carolina Tar Heels, earning first-team All-American honors twice. She was drafted third overall by NJ/NY Gotham FC in the 2021 NWSL Draft and then traded to the North Carolina Courage at the end of the season. She spent four seasons with the Courage, winning two NWSL Challenge Cups.

Pinto represented the United States youth national team at the 2016 FIFA U-17 World Cup and the 2018 FIFA U-20 World Cup. At age 16, she was called up to the senior national squad for the 2017 SheBelieves Cup. She was named the U.S. Soccer Young Female Player of the Year in 2019.

== Early life ==
Pinto was born in New Haven, Connecticut and grew up in Durham, North Carolina. At age 9, her father Hassan, who played for North Carolina's men's soccer team, placed her on the boys team at Triangle FC in Raleigh, North Carolina after contacting former North Carolina women's players, Mia Hamm, Kristine Lilly and Cindy Parlow, who told him they developed at an early age by playing against boys. At age 13, she joined Capital Area Soccer League (CASL) ECNL, also in Raleigh, playing there from 2014 to 2017, before joining NTH Tophat in Atlanta in 2018.

== College career ==
Anson Dorrance, head coach of the University of North Carolina women's team, who had recruited her father Hassan when he also coached the men's team, began recruiting Pinto when she was in eighth grade. She accepted the offer in ninth grade. Pinto made her college debut in August 2018 and scored the opening goal in a 2–0 win against Ohio State, the 1,000th win of Dorrance's career.

In 2019, her sophomore season, she was named First-Team All-American by United Soccer Coaches along with teammates Alessia Russo and Emily Fox, and helped the Tar Heels reach the 2019 College Cup Final. She was a First-Team All-ACC selection during all three years at North Carolina.

In the 2020 season (extended into Spring 2021 because of the COVID-19 pandemic), Pinto helped North Carolina reach the semifinal of the NCAA Tournament, where she scored a goal in the Tar Heels' 1–3 loss to Santa Clara. She was named First-Team All America for the second straight year and one of the three women's finalists for Hermann Trophy, given to the best collegiate soccer player of the season by the Missouri Athletic Club.

== Club career ==
=== NJ/NY Gotham FC ===
In January 2021, Pinto announced she was entering the 2021 NWSL Draft, although she planned to finish her junior season at North Carolina, with the 2020 NCAA Division I Women's Soccer Tournament moved to spring 2021 due to the COVID-19 pandemic. NJ/NY Gotham FC chose her in the first round of the draft, making her the third overall pick.

On June 4, 2021, Pinto signed a two-year contract with NJ/NY Gotham FC. She made her professional debut on June 20 as a substitute against the Orlando Pride.

=== North Carolina Courage ===
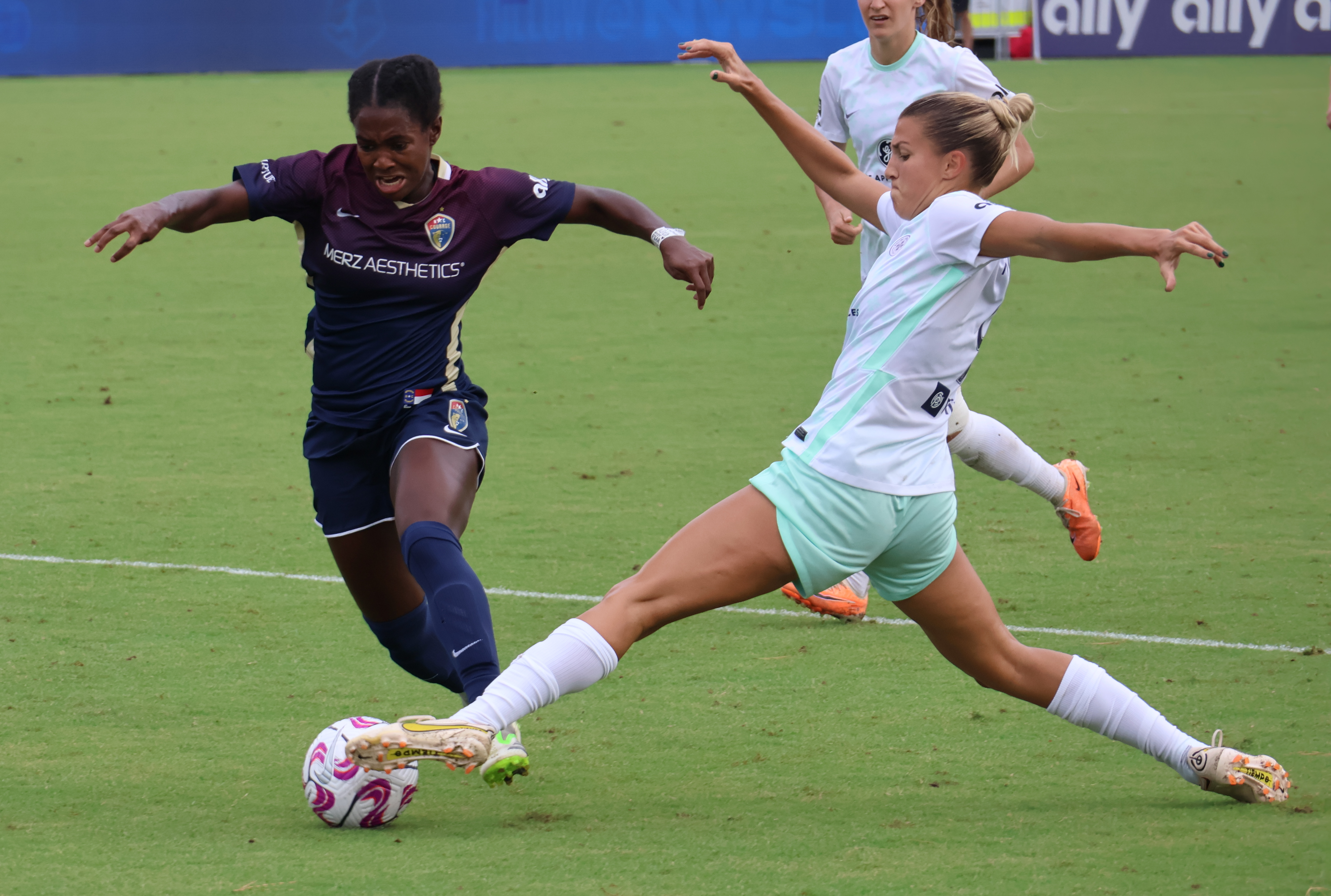
Pinto playing for the Courage in the 2023 NWSL Challenge Cup final

On December 6, 2021, Pinto was traded to the North Carolina Courage.

On March 19, 2022, Pinto scored her first professional goal in an NWSL Challenge Cup match against NJ/NY Gotham FC, making the score 1–0. On May 18, she scored her first NWSL regular-season goal in a match against Orlando Pride, making the score 2–1 Orlando. She played in 22 regular-season games in 2022, starting 17, and scored 1 goal as the Courage placed seventh and missed the playoffs.

On September 6, 2023, Pinto scored a stoppage-time 1–0 winner against the Kansas City Current in the NWSL Challenge Cup semifinals. Three days later, she replaced goalscorer Manaka Matsukubo in the Challenge Cup final, a 2–0 win over Racing Louisville. She played in 11 league games in 2023, starting 3, and scored 1 goal as the Courage placed third. She made her playoff debut as a substitute for Manaka in the quarterfinals, a 2–0 loss to eventual champions NJ/NY Gotham FC.

Having lost NWSL MVP Kerolin to an ACL tear, head coach Sean Nahas made Pinto the Courage's starting striker, instead of midfielder, at the start of the 2024 season. Pinto drew a penalty in the season opener against the Houston Dash on March 16, 2024, and scored the lone goal against Gotham FC in her second start on March 30. On September 1, she scored the stoppage-time 2–1 winner against the Kansas City Current, extending the Courage's home unbeaten run to 18 regular-season games. On September 29, she injured her knee against the Chicago Red Stars and missed the rest of the season. She played in 20 games in 2024, starting 9, and scored 3 goals as the Courage placed fifth.

On June 14, 2025, Pinto scored the 2–1 stoppage-time winner against Angel City. This made her the first NWSL player to score three second-half stoppage-time winning goals in all competitions. She played in 19 games in 2025, starting 6, and scored 3 goals as the Courage placed ninth and missed the playoffs.

=== Chicago Stars ===
On December 1, 2025, Chicago Stars FC announced that they had signed Pinto as a free agent to a two-year contract.

== International career ==
Pinto has been with the United States national team program since age 12, when she was invited to the youth national team Under-14 talent identification camp. She played for the United States U-17 team at the 2016 FIFA U-17 World Cup and was two years younger than the cutoff age at the 2018 FIFA U-20 World Cup for the United States U-20 team. Pinto played in every match at both tournaments. She was named the U.S. Soccer Young Female Player of the Year in 2019.

Pinto received her first senior national team call-up in January 2017, and at age 16, she was the youngest player named to the United States squad for the 2017 SheBelieves Cup, although she did not make an appearance in the tournament.

== Personal life ==
In 2018, Pinto, along with Alphonso Davies of Canada and Diego Lainez of Mexico, spoke before the 68th FIFA Congress to present North America's bid to host the 2026 FIFA World Cup.

In October 2020, Pinto, along with four other young athletes who called themselves Next Gen United, ran for and won seats on United States Soccer Federation's 20-person Athlete's Council, with the stated aim of diversifying the federation's leadership in age and culture. Prior to the election, the council had no Black members and just one person born after 1990. In July 2024, Pinto was one of five active NWSL players who represented the NWSL Players Association at the final negotiations in Philadelphia that updated the league's collective bargaining agreement through 2030.

While with the Courage, Pinto began her broadcasting career as an analyst for college soccer games on ACC Network Extra.

Both her parents attended the University of North Carolina in the early 1990s. Her father, Hassan, played for the men's soccer team and her mother, Meleata, played softball. Her older brother, Hassan Jr., played soccer in the USL Championship, and Malik, her younger brother, plays soccer in Major League Soccer.

== Honors and awards ==
North Carolina Tar Heels

- Atlantic Coast Conference: 2018, 2019
- ACC tournament: 2019

North Carolina Courage

- NWSL Challenge Cup: 2022, 2023

Individual

- First-team All-American: 2019, 2020
- First-team All-ACC: 2018, 2019, 2020

== See also ==
- List of University of North Carolina at Chapel Hill alumni
