= 2019 Atlantic Coast Conference women's soccer season =

- League: NCAA Division I
- Sport: Soccer
- Duration: August 2019 – December 2019
- Teams: 14

2020 NWSL College Draft
- Top draft pick: Courtney Peterson
- Picked by: Orlando Pride, 7th overall

Regular season
- Season champions: North Carolina
- Runners-up: Florida State
- Season MVP: Offensive: Deyna Castellanos; Midfielder: Deyna Castellanos; Defensive: Malia Berkely
- Top scorer: Meghan McCool – Virginia

Tournament
- Champions: North Carolina
- Runners-up: Virginia
- Finals MVP: (England) Alessia Russo – North Carolina

ACC women's soccer seasons
- ← 2018 2020 →

2019 ACC women's soccer standings
	Conf.						Overall
Team	W		L		T	PCT	W		L		T	PCT
No. 2 North Carolina ‍†‍‡‍^{y}	9	–	0	–	1	.950	24	–	1	–	2	.926
No. 7 Florida State ‍‍‍^{y}	8	–	2	–	0	.800	18	–	6	–	0	.750
No. 9 Virginia ‍‍‍^{y}	6	–	0	–	3	.833	17	–	2	–	3	.841
No. 25 Louisville ‍‍‍^{y}	5	–	3	–	2	.600	13	–	5	–	2	.700
No. 17 NC State ‍‍‍^{y}	4	–	2	–	4	.600	12	–	7	–	4	.609
No. 18 Duke ‍‍‍^{y}	3	–	1	–	6	.600	9	–	4	–	7	.625
Clemson ‍‍‍^{y}	5	–	5	–	0	.500	11	–	7	–	2	.600
Notre Dame ‍‍‍^{y}	4	–	4	–	2	.500	11	–	8	–	2	.571
Virginia Tech ‍‍‍^{y}	4	–	4	–	2	.500	12	–	5	–	2	.684
Pittsburgh ‍‍‍	2	–	6	–	2	.300	5	–	10	–	3	.361
Miami ‍‍‍	2	–	7	–	1	.250	5	–	9	–	2	.375
Wake Forest ‍‍‍	1	–	6	–	3	.250	6	–	8	–	4	.444
Syracuse ‍‍‍	1	–	7	–	1	.167	3	–	11	–	2	.250
Boston College ‍‍‍	1	–	8	–	1	.150	8	–	8	–	2	.500
† – Conference champion ‡ – 2019 ACC Tournament champion y – Invited to the NCAA Tournament; As of December 10, 2019; Rankings from United Soccer Coaches Poll; Source: The ACC

The 2019 Atlantic Coast Conference women's soccer season was the 31st season of women's varsity soccer in the conference.

The North Carolina Tar Heels were the defending regular season champions. The Florida State Seminoles were the defending ACC tournament champions.

== Teams ==
=== Stadiums and locations ===
Team	Stadium	Capacity
Boston College Eagles	Newton Soccer Complex	2,500
Clemson Tigers	Riggs Field	6,500
Duke Blue Devils	Koskinen Stadium	7,000
Florida State Seminoles	Seminole Soccer Complex	1,600
Louisville Cardinals	Lynn Stadium	5,300
Miami Hurricanes	Cobb Stadium	500
NC State Wolfpack	Dail Soccer Field	3,000
North Carolina Tar Heels	Dorrance Field	5,025
Notre Dame Fighting Irish	Alumni Stadium	2,500
Pittsburgh Panthers	Ambrose Urbanic Field	735
Syracuse Orange	SU Soccer Stadium	5,000
Virginia Cavaliers	Klöckner Stadium	8,000
Virginia Tech Hokies	Thompson Field	2,500
Wake Forest Demon Deacons	Spry Stadium	3,000

1. Georgia Tech does not sponsor women's soccer

== Coaches ==
=== Coaching changes ===
Pre-Season

- Boston College's coach Allison Foley resigned on December 12, 2018, citing the desire to pursue other opportunities. Jason Lowe was named as her replacement on January 9, 2019.
- Syracuse coach Phil Wheddon resigned on October 26, 2018, citing the desire to pursue other opportunities. Nicky Adams was hired as his replacement on February 25, 2019.

=== Head coaching records ===
Team	Head coach	Years at school	Overall record	Record at school	ACC record
Boston College	Jason Lowe	1	0–0–0	0–0–0	0–0–0
Clemson	Eddie Radwanski	9	221–119–34	82–54–21	34–41–8
Duke	Robbie Church	19	322–171–59	235–122–48	90–58–25
Florida State	Mark Krikorian	15	258–60–30	258–60–30	95–30–18
Louisville	Karen Ferguson-Dayes	19	169–156–35	169–156–35	18–24–8
Miami	Sarah Barnes	2	66–50–17	6–9–3	3–6–1
North Carolina	Anson Dorrance	41	809–67–36	809–67–36	191–26–9
NC State	Tim Santoro	7	50–63–10	50–63–10	15–44–4
Notre Dame	Nate Norman	2	66–45–14	8–10–0	4–6–0
Pittsburgh	Randy Waldrum	2	403–120–30	4–12–1	7–15–1
Syracuse	Nicky Adams	1	87–55–23	0–0–0	0–0–0
Virginia	Steve Swanson	19	402–155–56	298–92–45	119–44–17
Virginia Tech	Charles Adair	9	106–48–18	106–48–18	37–35–11
Wake Forest	Tony da Luz	22	302–206–46	257-165-44	86–96–19

Notes

- Records shown are prior to the 2019 season
- Years at school includes the 2019 season

== Pre-season ==
=== Hermann Trophy Watchlist ===
The ACC had 12 players named to the MAC Hermann Trophy preseason watch list.

Player	Class	Position	School
Malia Berkely	Junior	MF	Florida State
Deyna Castellanos	Senior	FW	Florida State
Emina Ekic	Junior	MF	Louisville
Jaelin Howell	Sophomore	MF	Florida State
Laurel Ivory	Junior	GK	Virginia
Sandy MacIver	Senior	GK	Clemson
Phoebe McClernon	Senior	DF	Virginia
Taylor Otto	Junior	FW	North Carolina
Brianna Pinto	Sophomore	MF	North Carolina
Alessia Russo	Junior	FW	North Carolina
Alexa Spaanstra	Sophomore	FW	Virginia
Yujie Zhao	Sophomore	MF	Florida State

=== Pre-season poll ===
The 2019 ACC Preseason Poll was announced on August 8, 2019. The defending regular season champions, North Carolina were voted to repeat their regular season crown. Florida State was voted in second place, even though they received two more first place votes than North Carolina. The league's 14 head coaches also voted on a preseason All-ACC team. Full results for the coaches poll and preseason team are shown below.

==== Pre-season coaches poll ====
Predicted finish	Team	Points (1st place)
1	North Carolina	188 (6)
2	Florida State	185 (8)
3	Virginia	163
4	Duke	155
5	Clemson	121
6	NC State	109
7	Wake Forest	106
8	Louisville	99
9	Notre Dame	88
10	Boston College	87
11	Virginia Tech	85
12	Miami	39
13	Pittsburgh	29
14	Syracuse	16

==== Pre-season All-ACC Team ====
Position	Player	Class	School
Goalkeeper	Mandy McGlynn	Senior	Florida State
Defender	Malia Berkely	(redshirt) Junior	Florida State
Defender	Emily Fox	Junior	North Carolina
Midfielder	Jaelin Howell	Sophomore	Florida State
Midfielder	Yujie Zhao	Sophomore	Florida State
Midfielder	Emina Ekic	Junior	Louisville
Midfielder	Brianna Pinto	Sophomore	North Carolina
Forward	Mariana Speckmaier	Junior	Clemson
Forward	Deyna Castellanos	Senior	Florida State
Forward	Tziarra King	Senior	NC State
Forward	Alessia Russo	Junior	North Carolina

== Regular season ==
=== Conference matrix ===
The table below shows head-to-head results between teams in conference play. Each team plays 10 matches. Each team does not play every other team.

	Boston College	Clemson	Duke	Florida State	Louisville	Miami	North Carolina	NC State	Notre Dame	Pittsburgh	Syracuse	Virginia	Virginia Tech	Wake Forest
vs. Boston College	–	2–1	–	5–4	2–1	0–4	3–0	2–0	–	2–1	–	6–1	2–1	3–3 (2OT)
vs. Clemson	1–2	–	4–1	2–1	1–0	3–2 (2OT)	1–0	–	0–1	2–3 (OT)	1–4	–	1–3	–
vs. Duke	–	1–4	–	1–0	1–1 (2OT)	–	0–0 (2OT)	1–1 (2OT)	1–1 (2OT)	–	1–4	0–0 (2OT)	0–0 (2OT)	2–3
vs. Florida State	4–5	1–2	0–1	–	–	0–3	2–0	–	–	0–1	0–1	1–0	2–3	1–2
vs. Louisville	1–2	0–1	1–1 (2OT)	–	–	0–1	3–0	1–0	0–0 (2OT)	–	0–3	3–0	–	1–2
vs. Miami	4–0	2–3 (2OT)	–	3–0	1–0	–	2–3	–	3–0	3–3 (2OT)	1–2	3–0	2–0	–
vs. North Carolina	0–3	0–1	0–0 (2OT)	0–2	0–3	3–2	–	0–1	0–3	1–3	–	–	0–2	–
vs. NC State	0–2	–	1–1 (2OT)	–	0–1	–	1–0	–	0–3	2–1	2–3 (OT)	0–0 (2OT)	1–1 (2OT)	1–1 (2OT)
vs. Notre Dame	–	1–0	1–1 (2OT)	–	0–0 (2OT)	0–3	3–0	3–0	–	0–4	0–3	3–0	–	2–3 (2OT)
vs. Pittsburgh	1–2	3–2 (OT)	–	1–0	–	3–3 (2OT)	3–1	1–2	4–0	–	1–1 (2OT)	–	1–0	3–2 (2OT)
vs. Syracuse	–	4–1	4–1	1–0	3–0	2–1	–	3–2 (OT)	3–0	1–1 (2OT)	–	–	–	1–2
vs. Virginia	1–6	–	0–0 (2OT)	0–1	0–3	0–3	–	0–0 (2OT)	0–3	–	–	–	0–2	1–1 (2OT)
vs. Virginia Tech	1–2	3–1	0–0 (2OT)	3–2	–	0–2	2–0	1–1 (2OT)	–	0–1	–	2–0	–	0–1
vs. Wake Forest	3–3 (2OT)	–	3–2	2–1	2–1	–	–	1–1 (2OT)	3–2 (2OT)	2–3 (2OT)	2–1	1–1 (2OT)	1–0	–
Total	1–8–1	5–5–0	3–1–6	8–2–0	5–3–2	2–7–1	9–0–1	4–2–4	4–4–2	2–6–2	1–7–1	6–0–3	4–4–2	1–6–3

=== Rankings ===
==== United Soccer ====
Legend
Increase in ranking
Decrease in ranking
Not ranked previous week

	Pre	Wk 1	Wk 2	Wk 3	Wk 4	Wk 5	Wk 6	Wk 7	Wk 8	Wk 9	Wk 10	Wk 11	Wk 12	Final
Boston College	RV	RV	RV	RV	RV	RV	RV							
Clemson	RV	RV	19	20	10	9	8	9	17	15	22	25	RV	RV
Duke	8	10	12	11	8	10	10	11	9	9	9	12	12	18
Florida State	1 (33)	1 (26)	6	6	6	6	6	5	6	5	5	5	6	7
Louisville	RV	RV	RV	RV	20	22	19	16	14	12	14	22	23	25
Miami														
North Carolina	2	2	1 (24)	1 (29)	4	4	3 (2)	3 (3)	3 (1)	3	3	3	2 (8)	2 (1)
NC State	21	17	14	RV				RV	RV	RV	RV	23	RV	17
Notre Dame		RV	RV	RV										
Pittsburgh														
Syracuse														
Virginia	9	6	5	4	1 (21)	1 (28)	1 (22)	1 (22)	1 (19)	1 (24)	1 (26)	1 (27)	3	9
Virginia Tech	25	RV	23	16	18	16	23	20	RV	25	RV	RV	RV	
Wake Forest	23	RV	25	RV		RV	RV							

==== Top Drawer Soccer ====
Legend
Increase in ranking
Decrease in ranking
Not ranked previous week

	Pre	Wk 1	Wk 2	Wk 3	Wk 4	Wk 5	Wk 6	Wk 7	Wk 8	Wk 9	Wk 10	Wk 11	Wk 12	Wk 13	Wk 14	Wk 15	Wk 16	Final
Boston College				21	18	19	23	RV										
Clemson	RV	RV	RV	22	RV	23	20	20	17	18	16	20	19	21	17	18	18	18
Duke	17	17	22	18	16	15	12	11	12	10	11	11	18	20	16	17	17	17
Florida State	1	1	1	7	7	6	6	4	4	6	5	6	6	5	5	4	5	5
Louisville						25	RV	16	10	8	9	15						
Miami																		
North Carolina	3	3	3	2	1	4	3	2	2	2	2	2	2	1	1	1	1	2
NC State	21	21	20	16	23								RV	RV	RV	24	24	24
Notre Dame			RV	RV	RV													
Pittsburgh																		
Syracuse																		
Virginia	5	5	5	4	3	1	1	1	1	1	1	1	1	3	3	9	9	9
Virginia Tech	RV	RV	RV	RV	20	16	13	19	18	19	17	21	20	22				
Wake Forest	RV	RV	25	20	21													

=== Players of the Week ===
Week	Offensive Player of the week	Defensive of the week	Reference
Week 1 – Aug. 27	Amanda West, Pittsburgh	Maycee Bell, North Carolina	
Week 2 – Sep. 3	Diana Ordoñez, Virginia	Hannah McLaughlin, Clemson	
Week 3 – Sep. 10	Nicole Kozlova, Virginia Tech	Laurel Ivory, Virginia	
Week 4 – Sep. 17	Emina Ekic, Louisville	Mandy McGlynn, Virginia Tech	
Week 4 – Sep. 17	Maliah Morris, Clemson	Mandy McGlynn, Virginia Tech	
Week 5 – Sep. 24	Tziarra King, NC State	Maycee Bell (2), North Carolina	
Week 6 – Oct. 1	Deyna Castellanos, Florida State	Laurel Ivory (2), Virginia	
Week 7 – Oct. 8	Bridgette Andrzejewski, North Carolina	Mandy McGlynn (2), Virginia Tech	
Week 8 – Oct. 15	Mackenzie Pluck, Duke	Laurel Ivory (3), Virginia	
Week 9 – Oct. 22	Meghan McCool, Virginia	Amaia Peña, Pittsburgh	
Week 10 – Oct. 29	Meghan McCool (2), Virginia	Emily Fox, North Carolina	
Week 11 – Nov. 5	Deyna Castellanos (2), Florida State	Lulu Guttenberger, NC State	

== Postseason ==
=== ACC tournament ===
Semifinals
1	North Carolina	3
5	NC State	0
2	Florida State	1
3	Virginia	2^{(OT)}

Final
1	North Carolina	2^{(2OT)}
3	Virginia	1

=== NCAA tournament ===
Seed	Region	School	1st round	2nd round	3rd round	Quarterfinals	Semifinals	Championship
1	Florida State	Florida State	W 2–0 vs. Lamar – (Tallahassee, FL)	W 2–0 vs. Brown – (Tallahassee, FL)	W 2–1 vs. South Florida – (Tallahassee, FL)	L 0–4 vs. UCLA – (Tallahassee, FL)		
1	North Carolina	North Carolina	W 5–0 vs. Belmont – (Chapel Hill, NC)	W 1–0 vs. Colorado – (Chapel Hill, NC)	W 4–0 vs. Michigan – (Chapel Hill, NC)	W 3–2 vs. USC – (Chapel Hill, NC)	W 2–1 vs. Washington State – (San Diego, CA)	T 0–0 (4–5 PKs) vs. Stanford – (San Diego, CA)
1	Virginia	Virginia	W 3–0 vs. Radford – (Charlottesville, VA)	L 2–3 vs. Washington State – (Charlottesville, VA)				
	Florida State	Clemson	T 0–0 (5–4 PKs) vs. Vanderbilt – (Clemson, SC)	L 0–5 vs. UCLA – (Los Angeles, CA)				
	Florida State	Duke	W 4–0 vs. Utah – (Durham, NC)	L 0–1 vs. Wisconsin – (Los Angeles, CA)				
	Stanford	Louisville	W 1–0 vs. Lipscomb – (Louisville, KY)	L 0–4 vs. BYU – (Provo, UT)				
	Stanford	NC State	W 3–0 vs. Navy – (Raleigh, NC)	W 2–1 vs. Arkansas – (Provo, UT)	L 0–3 vs. BYU – (Provo, UT)			
	Virginia	Notre Dame	W 1–0 vs. Saint Louis – (Notre Dame, IN)	L 0–1 vs. South Carolina - (Columbia, SC)				
	Virginia	Virginia Tech	L 0–1 vs. Xavier – (Blacksburg, VA)					
		W–L (%):	7–1–1 (.833)	3–5–0 (.375)	2–1–0 (.667)	1–1–0 (.500)	1–0–0 (1.000)	0–0–1 (.500) Total: 14–8–2 (.625)

== Awards and honors ==
=== All-Americans ===
2019 United Soccer Coaches All-Americans
First Team	Second Team	Third Team
Malia Berkely, DF, Florida State; Emily Fox, DF, North Carolina; Brianna Pinto, MF, North Carolina; Alessia Russo, FW, North Carolina	Mandy McGlynn, GK, Virginia Tech; Deyna Castellanos, MF, Florida State; Emina Ekic, MF, Louisville	Maycee Bell, DF, North Carolina; Tziarra King, MF, NC State; Meghan McCool, FW, Virginia

=== ACC Awards ===
2019 ACC Women's Soccer Individual Awards
Award	Recipient(s)
Offensive Player of the Year	Deyna Castellanos – Florida State
Coach of the Year	Anson Dorrance – North Carolina
Defensive Player of the Year	Malia Berkely – Florida State
Midfielder of the Year	Deyna Castellanos – Florida State
Freshman of the Year	Maycee Bell – North Carolina

2019 ACC Women's Soccer All-Conference Teams
First Team	Second Team	Third Team	All-Freshman Team
Malia Berkely, (redshirt) Jr., D, Florida State; Deyna Castellanos, Sr., M, Florida State; Jaelin Howell, So., M, Florida State; Yujie Zhao, So., M, Florida State; Emina Ekic, Jr., M, Louisville; Emily Fox, Jr., D, North Carolina; Brianna Pinto, So., M, North Carolina; Alessia Russo, Jr., F, North Carolina; Tziarra King, Sr., M, NC State; Meghan McCool, Sr., F, Virginia; Mandy McGlynn, Sr., GK, Virginia Tech	Delaney Graham, So., D, Duke; Ella Stevens, Sr., M, Duke; Gabrielle Kouzelos, Jr., GK, Louisville; Maycee Bell, Fr., D, North Carolina; Lotte Wubben-Moy, Jr., D, North Carolina; Phoebe McClernon, Sr., D, Virginia; Diana Ordóñez, Fr., F, Virginia; Courtney Petersen, R-Sr., D, Virginia; Alexa Spaanstra, So., M, Virginia; Taryn Torres, Jr., M, Virginia; Madison Hammond, Sr., D, Wake Forest	Olivia Vaughn, Sr., F, Boston College; Brooklynn Rivers, Sr., F, Louisville; Lulu Guttenberger, R-So., D, NC State; Krissi Schuster, Sr., D, NC State; Ricci Walkling, Sr., M, NC State; Taylor Otto, R-Jr., M, North Carolina; Sammi Fisher, Jr., M, Notre Dame; Eva Hurm, Jr., F, Notre Dame; Amanda West, Fr., F, Pittsburgh; Laurel Ivory, Jr., GK, Virginia; Kelsey Irwin, R-Sr., D, Virginia Tech	Sam Smith, Fr., F, Boston College; Hal Hershfelt, Fr., M, Clemson; Maliah Morris, Fr., F, Clemson; Sophie Jones, Fr., M, Duke; Heather Payne, Fr., D, Florida State; Jenna Nighswonger, Fr., F, Florida State; Jameese Joseph, Fr., F, NC State; Maycee Bell, Fr., D, North Carolina; Isabel Cox, Fr., F, North Carolina; Amanda West, Fr., F, Pittsburgh; Diana Ordóñez, Fr., F, Virginia

== 2020 NWSL Draft ==
FW	Forward	MF	Midfielder	DF	Defender	GK	Goalkeeper

Player	Team	Round	Pick #	Position	School
Courtney Petersen	Orlando Pride	1	7	DF	Virginia
Tziarra King	Utah Royals	1	8	FW	NC State
Phoebe McClernon	Orlando Pride	2	14	DF	Virginia
Bridgette Andrzejewski	Houston Dash	2	18	FW	North Carolina
Zoe Morse	Chicago Red Stars	3	19	MF	Virginia
Mandy McGlynn	Sky Blue	3	20	GK	Virginia Tech
Ella Stevens	Chicago Red Stars	3	24	FW	Duke
