= Claudia Dickey =

American soccer player (born 2000)

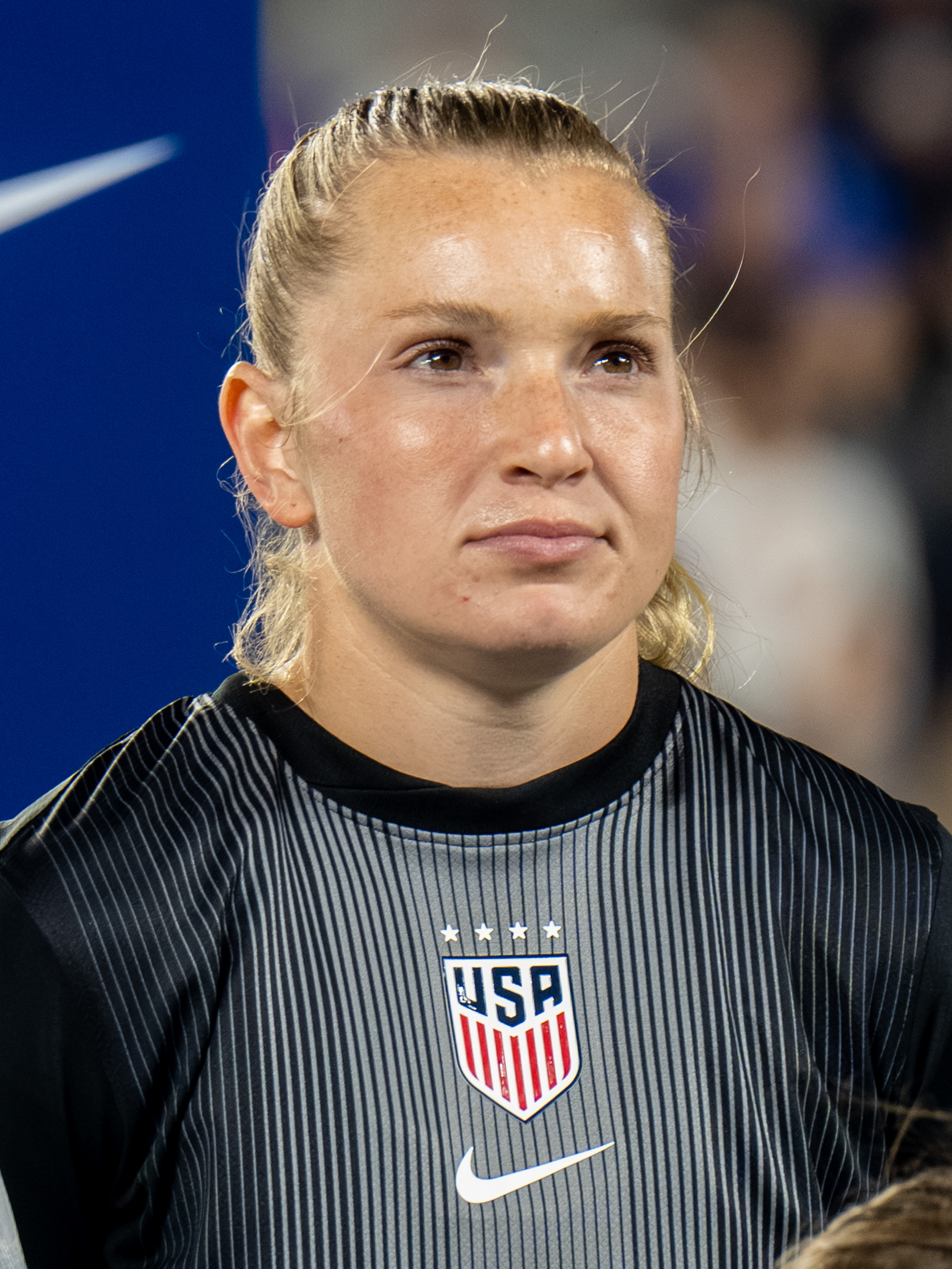
- Dickey with the United States in 2025

Personal information
- Full name: Claudia Jane Dickey
- Date of birth: January 6, 2000 (age 26)
- Place of birth: Charlotte, North Carolina, United States
- Height: 5 ft 10 in (1.78 m)
- Position: Goalkeeper

Team information
- Current team: Seattle Reign
- Number: 1

Youth career
- Charlotte SA

College career
Years	Team	Apps	(Gls)
2018–2021	North Carolina Tar Heels	81	(2)

Senior career*
Years	Team	Apps	(Gls)
2022–	Seattle Reign	76	(0)

International career^{‡}
2017–2020	United States U20		
2025–	United States	12	(0)
- * Club domestic league appearances and goals as of 16:32, November 8, 2026 (UTC) ‡ National team caps and goals as of October 10, 2026

Claudia Jane Dickey (born January 6, 2000) is an American professional soccer player who plays as a goalkeeper for the Seattle Reign of the National Women's Soccer League (NWSL) and the United States national team. She played college soccer for the North Carolina Tar Heels and was drafted by the Reign in the 2022 NWSL Draft.

== Early life ==
Dickey was raised in Charlotte, North Carolina, and attended Charlotte Latin School. She played soccer and basketball in high school, including one season when she played as a midfielder. In her senior season, she was named the North Carolina Soccer Coaches Association (NCSCA) Player of the Year for 2017.

== College career ==
Dickey shared playing time with Samantha Leshnak in her freshman season with the North Carolina Tar Heels, making 17 appearances (6 starts). She came off the bench and converted a penalty kick in a shootout win against UCLA in the quarterfinals of the NCAA tournament. She was unused in the semifinals and final as North Carolina finished runners-up to Florida State in the 2018 championship game. In her sophomore season, she made 26 appearances (11 starts) and became the starter by the end of the year. She allowed only one goal in three starts in the ACC tournament, which North Carolina won. She made a season-high 6 saves against Stanford in the 2019 national title game, but North Carolina lost on penalties after a 0–0 draw.

Dickey played every minute of her junior season, which was shortened due to the COVID-19 pandemic. She led the nation with 15 clean sheets in 20 games and was named first-team All-ACC. In the ACC tournament, she opened scoring with a penalty in a 2–0 win against Virginia in the semifinals before losing to Florida State in the conference final. In the NCAA tournament, she allowed no goals until a 3–1 loss to Santa Clara in the semifinals. In her senior season, she kept 7 clean sheets in 18 games. She scored the second goal of her career, also a penalty, in a 3–0 win against Clemson in the 2021 regular season.

== Club career ==
Claudia Dickey with the Seattle Reign FC in 2026

=== Seattle Reign ===
Dickey was drafted 20th overall by OL Reign in the 2022 NWSL Draft and was signed to a one-year contract with a one-year option She spent the entire 2022 season as Phallon Tullis-Joyce's backup as the Reign won the NWSL Shield.

Dickey made her NWSL debut on April 20, 2023, starting in a 2–0 win against Angel City FC in the NWSL Challenge Cup group stage. She kept clean sheets in all three group stage games, leading head coach Laura Harvey to give her the start against Angel City on August 27, where the Reign lost 2–1. Tullis-Joyce soon left the Reign for Manchester United, and Dickey finished the 2023 regular season with 3 clean sheets in 6 games. In the playoffs, she kept shutouts in 1–0 wins against Angel City and the San Diego Wave before falling 2–1 to NJ/NY Gotham FC in the championship game. After the season, the Reign extended her contract through 2025.

Dickey sustained a knee injury during a 3–2 loss to Bay FC on April 14, 2024, and had to be substituted for Laurel Ivory. After missing two months of action, she returned in a 0–0 draw against the Portland Thorns on June 16. She finished the 2024 regular season with 3 clean sheets in 18 games as the Reign placed 13th of 14 teams.

Dickey played every minute of the 2025 regular season, keeping 7 clean sheets in 26 games. Performing at a level to earn her first USWNT call-ups, she led the league with 88 saves and 11.9 post-shot expected goals prevented and ranked second with a 76.7 save percentage. She won NWSL Save of the Week for a diving effort to stop Delphine Cascarino in a 2–1 win against the San Diego Wave on June 6. She helped the Reign improve to fifth in the final standings but lost 2–0 to the defending champion Orlando Pride in the quarterfinals. She was nominated for NWSL Goalkeeper of the Year, and named the club's Most Valuable Player.

== International career ==
Dickey is a former United States youth international.

Dickey received her first call-up to the senior national team in January 2025. She made her senior debut on June 26, 2025, starting in a 4–0 friendly win against the Republic of Ireland.

== Personal life ==
Dickey played soccer and basketball growing up and was briefly a two-sport athlete with the North Carolina basketball team before focusing on soccer. She played in 6 games and scored 3 points in 15 minutes of action in the 2018–19 season.

== Career statistics ==
=== International ===
As of match played October 10, 2026

National team	Year	Apps	Goals
United States	2025	6	0
United States	2026	6	0
Total		12	0

== Honors ==
United States

- SheBelieves Cup: 2026

North Carolina Tar Heels

- Atlantic Coast Conference: 2018, 2019
- ACC tournament: 2019

OL Reign

- NWSL Shield: 2022
- The Women's Cup: 2022

Individual

- Seattle Reign Most Valuable Player: 2025
- NWSL Team of the Month: May 2025
- First-team All-ACC: 2019
- ACC tournament all-tournament team: 2019, 2020
