= Clara Schilke =

American soccer player (born 1998)

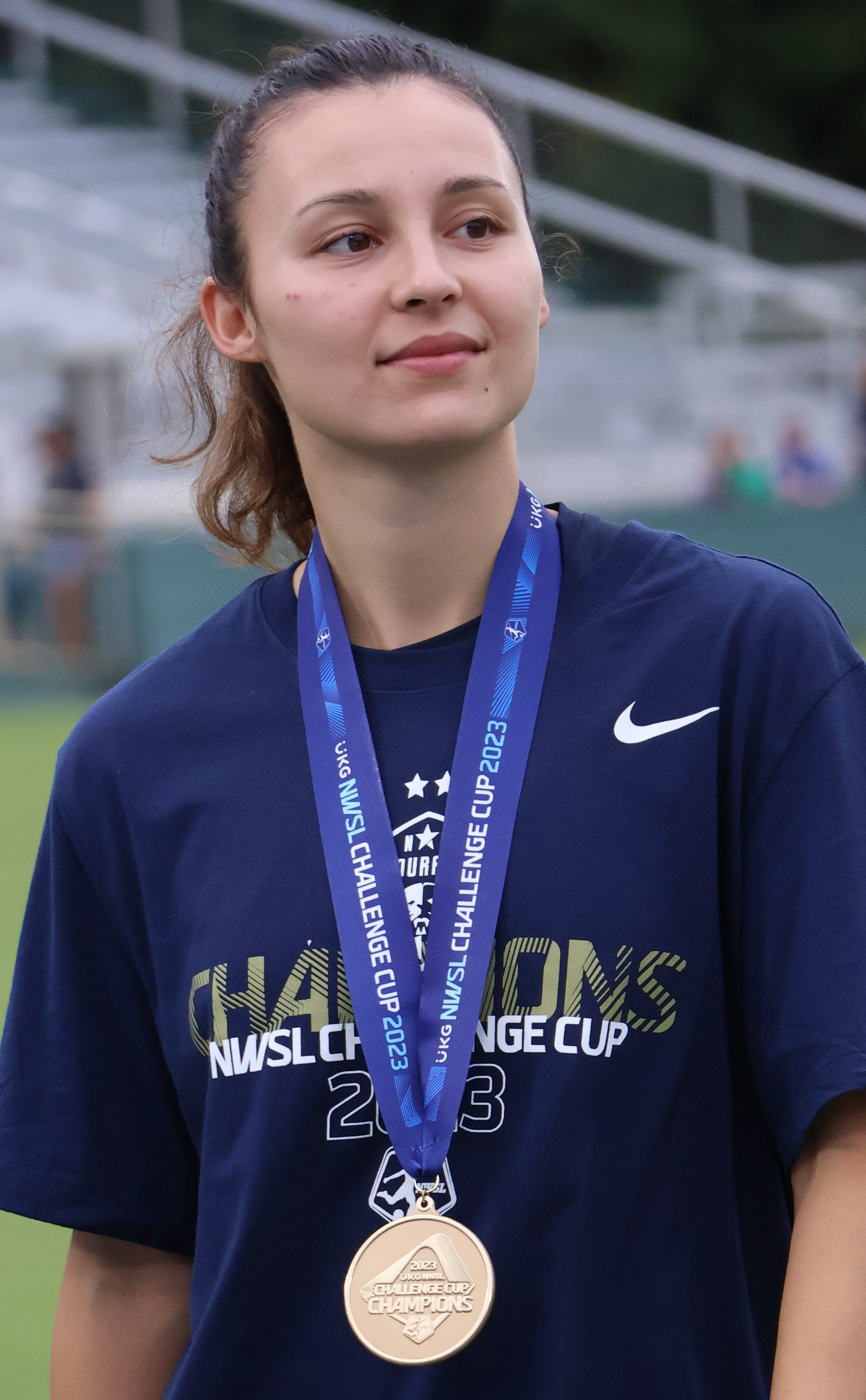
- Schilke with the North Carolina Courage in 2023

Personal information
- Full name: Clara Ellen Schilke
- Birth name: Clara Ellen Robbins
- Date of birth: September 12, 1998 (age 28)
- Place of birth: Stafford, Virginia, U.S.
- Height: 5 ft 7 in (1.70 m)
- Position: Midfielder

College career
Years	Team	Apps	(Gls)
2016–2022	Florida State Seminoles	110	(17)

Senior career*
Years	Team	Apps	(Gls)
2023–2024	North Carolina Courage	2	(0)
- * Club domestic league appearances and goals

Clara Ellen Schilke (née Robbins; born September 12, 1998) is an American former professional soccer player who played as a midfielder. She played seven seasons of college soccer for the Florida State Seminoles, winning NCAA championships in 2018 and 2021, and made the most appearances in program history. She was a three-time All-ACC selection and was named the ACC tournament's most valuable player in 2020 and 2021. She was drafted by the North Carolina Courage of the National Women's Soccer League (NWSL) in the first round of the 2023 NWSL Draft. She was injured during the 2023 season and retired the following year at age 25.

== Early life ==
Schilke grew up in Stafford, Virginia. She began playing soccer "just to get out and do something". She played for Northern Virginia Soccer Club and then captained Fredericksburg FC's 98 Gold youth team, which went 41–2 in her last seasons, and she trained with her state and region Olympic Development Program. She played one year of high school soccer as a freshman at Colonial Forge High School, where she graduated in 2016.

== College career ==
Schilke redshirted her first year at Florida State in 2016, then debuted as a redshirt freshman and became a regular starter during the 2017 season, contributing five assists. Later that school year, in February 2018, she was called into training camp with the United States national under-19 team. She played in only three college games that fall before a season-ending injury forced her to sit out the Seminoles' run to the 2018 NCAA title. She scored her first collegiate goal during the 2020 season, when she led the team in goals and assists with six each. She contributed six goals and a career-high eight assists in 2021.

Schilke was named most valuable player of the ACC tournament twice: in 2020, for scoring twice in the first six minutes and adding an assist in the final against North Carolina, and in 2021, for scoring the lone goal from long range in the final against Virginia. She recorded a goal and an assist during the Seminoles' run to the 2020 NCAA title game and two assists during their 2021 NCAA title-winning run. She considered leaving Florida State with the departure of longtime coach Mark Krikorian but returned for a seventh and final season in which the team defended their ACC title and made it to the 2022 NCAA semifinals. TopDrawerSoccer described Schilke as "the anchor of everything" and "as reliable as ever" during her final college tournament.

Having received extra years of eligibility due to her freshman redshirt, medical redshirt, and the COVID-19 pandemic, Schilke finished her college career with 110 caps, the most in program history and second-most in women's college soccer history at the time, and totaled 17 career goals and 25 assists. She was named to the All-ACC second team in each in her last three years. She earned her bachelor's degree in December 2019 and master's degree in December 2021, both in exercise physiology.

== Club career ==
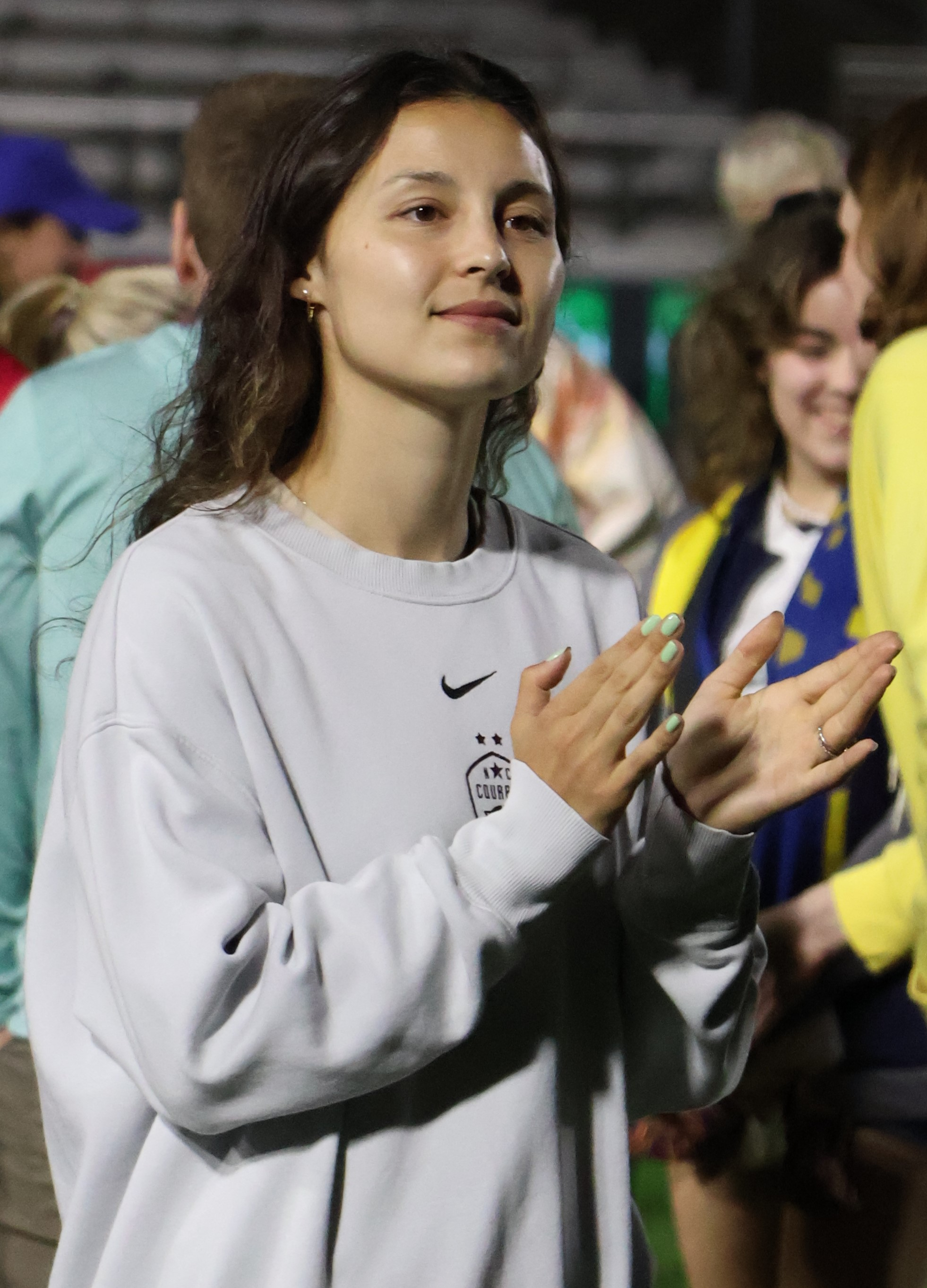
Schilke after a Courage game in 2024

The North Carolina Courage selected Schilke ninth overall in the 2023 NWSL Draft with one of their four first-round draft picks. She was signed to a three-year contract. She made her professional debut in a Challenge Cup draw to the Orlando Pride on April 19, 2023. She made two regular season appearances, starting in a loss to NJ/NY Gotham FC on April 22 and substituting late against Racing Louisville FC on May 27, before suffering a season-ending rupture of her left Achilles tendon. She remained on the season-ending injury list at the start of the 2024 season and announced her retirement from the NWSL on May 10, 2024, to spend more time with her family.

== Personal life ==
She married Gabe Schilke in July 2023.

== Career statistics ==
Appearances and goals by club, season and competition
Club	Season	League			Cup (Note: Includes the NWSL Challenge Cup)		Playoffs (Note: Includes NWSL Playoffs)		Total	
Club	Season	Division	Apps	Goals	Apps	Goals	Apps	Goals	Apps	Goals
North Carolina Courage	2023	NWSL	2	0	1	0	0	0	3	0
Career total			2	0	1	0	0	0	3	0

== Honors ==
Florida State Seminoles

- NCAA Division I women's soccer tournament: 2018, 2021
- ACC women's soccer tournament: 2016, 2018, 2020, 2021, 2022

North Carolina Courage

- NWSL Challenge Cup: 2023

Individual

- All-ACC second team: 2020, 2021, 2022
- ACC tournament most valuable player: 2020, 2021
- ACC all-tournament team: 2020, 2021
- NCAA College Cup all-tournament team: 2020
