= Bubba Cunningham =

American college sports administrator (born 1962)

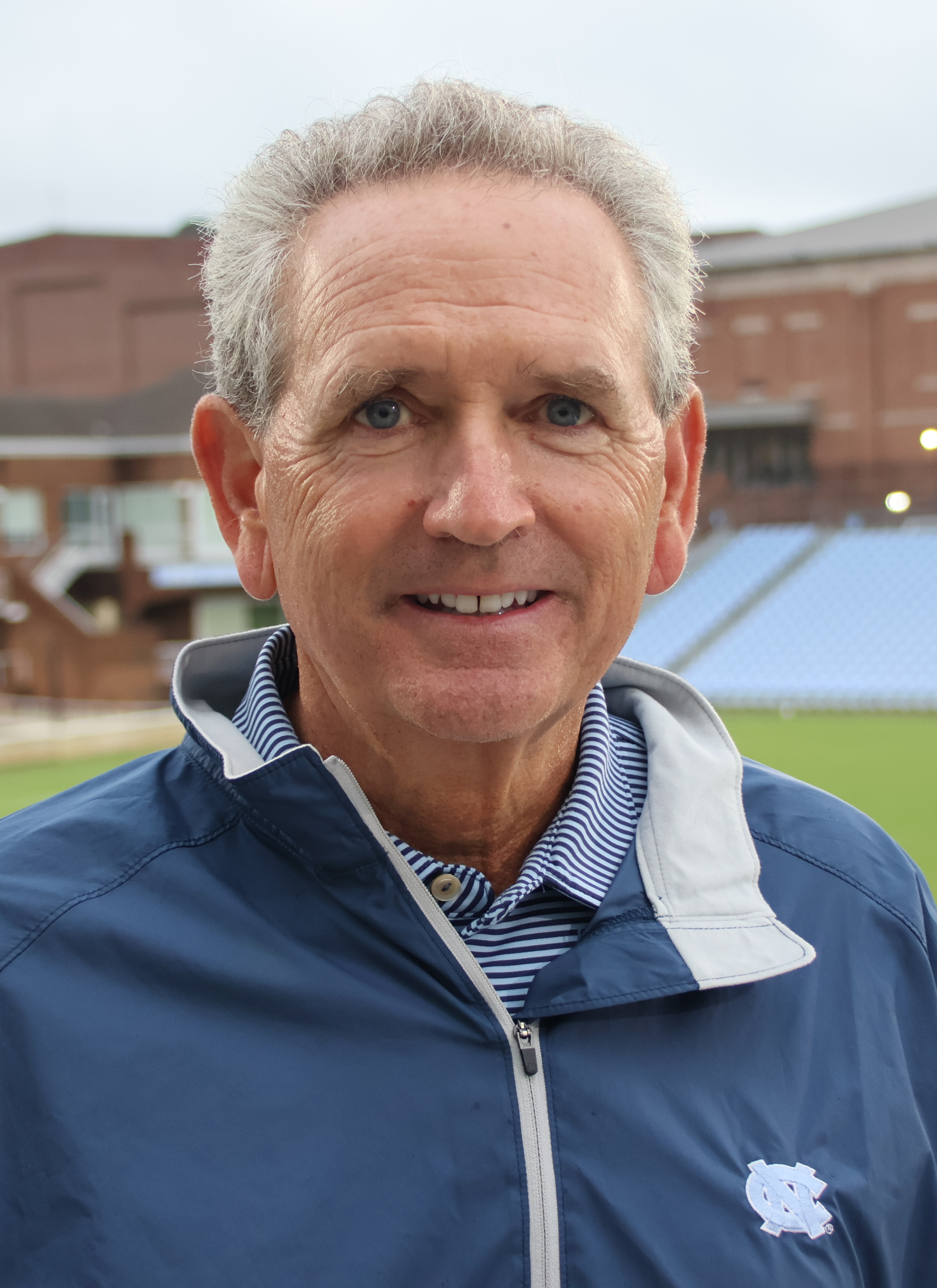
- Cunningham in 2025

Biographical details
- Born: May 12, 1962 (age 64); Flint, Michigan, U.S.

Playing career
- 1982–1983: Notre Dame

Administrative career (AD unless noted)
- 1995–2002: Notre Dame (up to associate athletics director)
- 2002–2005: Ball State
- 2005–2011: Tulsa
- 2011–2026: North Carolina

Lawrence R. "Bubba" Cunningham (born May 12, 1962) is an American athletic administrator who was most recently the athletic director at the University of North Carolina at Chapel Hill since November 2011. He previously served as athletic director at the University of Tulsa in Oklahoma from 2005 to 2011 and at Ball State University in Indiana from 2002 to 2005.

== Early life and education ==
Lawrence R. Cunningham was born in Flint, Michigan, and was later raised in Naples, Florida. He attended the University of Notre Dame in Indiana, playing golf there. From the University of Notre Dame, he received a bachelor's and a master's degrees in 1984 and 1988, respectively.

== Career ==
Cunningham began his career at the athletics department of the University of Notre Dame from 1995 to 2002, ending up as an associate athletics director.

Cunningham was made athletics director for the first time at Ball State University in Muncie, Indiana in 2002. During his tenure at Ball State, a $12 million campaign was conducted to renovate the football stadium.

Cunningham accepted his second athletic director job at the University of Tulsa in Tulsa, Oklahoma in 2005. He was Tulsa's athletic director during their transition to Conference USA. During his tenure, Tulsa won 34 league championships in various sports. He was awarded as the 2008–09 FBS Central Region Athletics Director of the Year by the National Association of Collegiate Directors of Athletics.

On November 14, 2011, Cunningham accepted his current athletic director job at the University of North Carolina at Chapel Hill. He was awarded the 2019–20 AD of the Year Award from the National Association of Collegiate Directors of Athletics.

In 2025, controversy surrounded Cunningham, who also served on the NCAA tournament selection committee, when the UNC men's basketball team, a team some Bracketologists viewed as a non tournament team due to their poor NET Quad 1 record (1-12), was invited to the 2025 NCAA tournament as an 11 seed. When the NCAA selection committee placed UNC into the tournament, Cunningham received a $100,000 bonus.

Cunningham announced he will step down as athletics director at the University of North Carolina at Chapel Hill in the summer of 2026.

== Personal life ==
Cunningham is married to Tina, and they have four children.
