= Talia DellaPeruta =

American soccer player (born 2002)

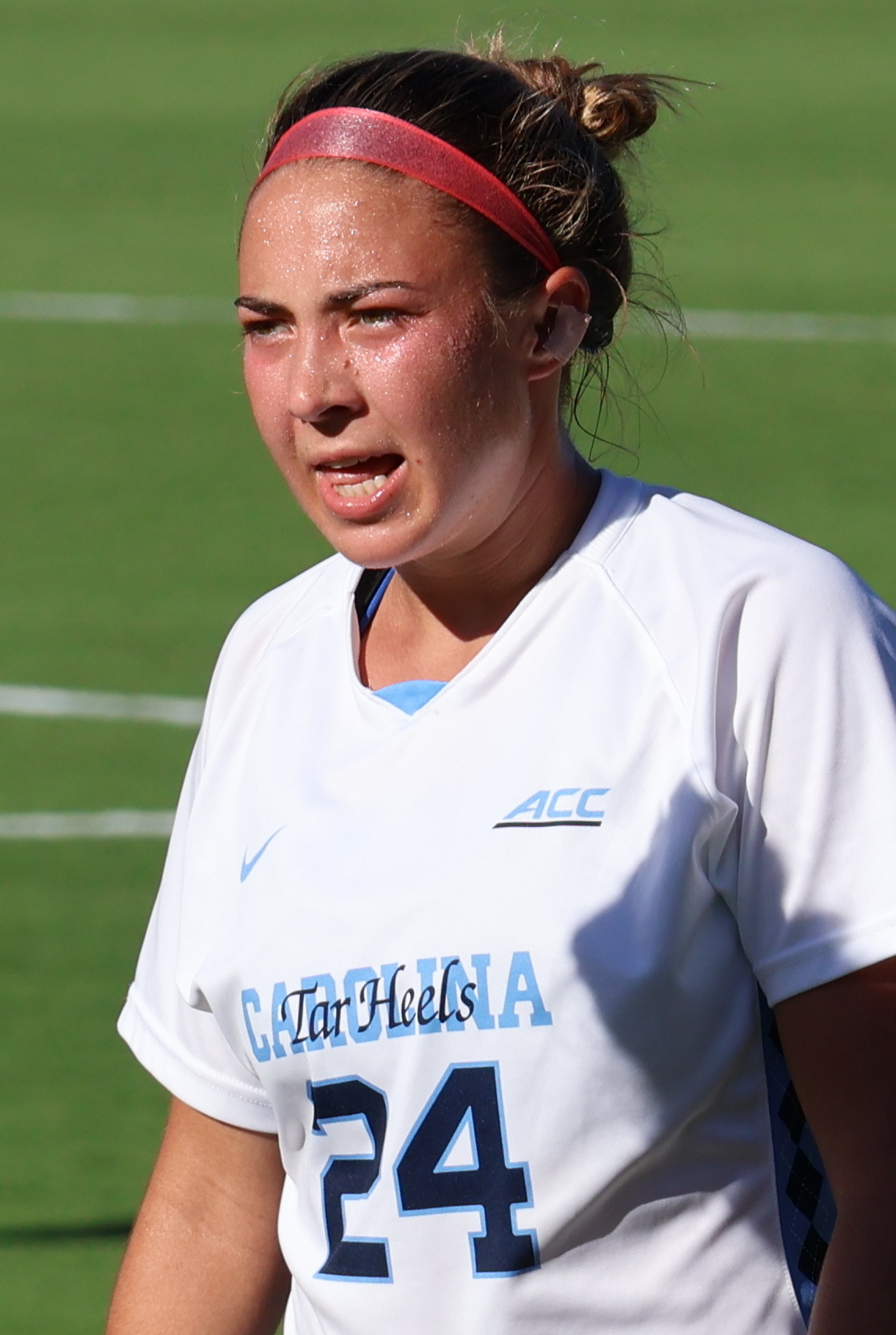
- DellaPeruta with North Carolina in 2023

Personal information
- Full name: Talia Victoria DellaPeruta
- Date of birth: April 19, 2002 (age 24)
- Place of birth: Bitburg, Germany
- Height: 5 ft 5 in (1.65 m)
- Position: Midfielder

Youth career
- Tophat SC

College career
Years	Team	Apps	(Gls)
2020–2023	North Carolina Tar Heels	66	(11)

Senior career*
Years	Team	Apps	(Gls)
2024	Sampdoria	10	(1)
2024–2026	Feyenoord	14	(2)

International career
2017–2018	United States U-17	19	(1)
2019–2022	United States U-20	22	(5)
- * Club domestic league appearances and goals as of May 22, 2026

Talia Victoria DellaPeruta (born April 19, 2002) is an American professional soccer player who plays as a midfielder. She played college soccer for the North Carolina Tar Heels. She has also played for Sampdoria in Italy and Feyenoord in the Netherlands. She represented the United States at the under-15, under-17, and under-20 levels, winning four CONCACAF championships across those levels.

== Early life ==
DellaPeruta was born in Bitburg, Germany, and raised in Cumming, Georgia. She played ECNL club soccer for Tophat SC and attended West Forsyth High School. She committed to play college soccer for the North Carolina Tar Heels before her sophomore year. During her senior year, she trained with Frauen-Bundesliga club FC Köln. TopDrawerSoccer ranked her as the second-best recruit in the nation in the class of 2020, part of North Carolina's third-ranked recruiting class.

== College career ==
DellaPeruta played in all 20 games and scored 5 goals as a freshman with the North Carolina Tar Heels, receiving Atlantic Coast Conference (ACC) all-freshman honors and helping reach the NCAA tournament semifinals. The following season, she was limited by injury to 8 appearances and scored 1 goal. In her junior year in 2022, after missing the start of the season at the 2022 FIFA U-20 Women's World Cup, she played in 15 games and scored 4 goals. During that year's NCAA tournament, she scored in three consecutive wins – against Georgia, BYU, and Notre Dame – as the Tar Heels reached the national title game, where they lost to UCLA. Being named a team co-captain, she played in all 23 games and scored 1 goal in her senior year in 2023. Her sister, Tori, was her teammate during her last two seasons.

== Club career ==
=== Sampdoria ===
In January 2024, DellaPeruta and her sister signed their first professional contracts with Italian club Sampdoria. On January 17, she made her professional debut as a halftime substitute in a 4–0 loss to Juventus in the first leg of the Coppa Italia quarterfinals. On March 16, she registered her first professional assist as Sampdoria won 5–0 over Pomigliano with four goals from her sister. On April 21, she made her first start at home and scored her first professional goal in a 3–1 loss to AC Milan. She finished the season with 12 appearances and 1 goal in all competitions.

=== Feyenoord ===
On August 1, 2024, DellaPeruta signed a two-year contract with Dutch club Feyenoord. However, she suffered a muscle injury during preseason which prevented her from playing for an entire season.

On November 23, 2025, DellaPeruta made her long-awaited Feyenoord debut, returning to action after over 500 days in a 3–0 win over Hera United. Joined by her sister after the winter break, she scored her first goal for the club in her first league start, drawing 1–1 with ADO Den Haag on February 15, 2026. She made 17 appearances and scored 2 goals in all competitions as Feyenoord placed third in the league, their best finish in club history.

== International career ==
DellaPeruta helped the United States under-15 team win the 2016 CONCACAF Girls' U-15 Championship, starting in the final. She remained a starter for the under-17 team that won the 2018 CONCACAF Women's U-17 Championship, later being selected to the roster for the 2018 FIFA U-17 Women's World Cup. She subsequently helped the under-20 team win both the 2020 and 2022 CONCACAF Women's U-20 Championships, scoring a penalty in the latter final. She also scored the winning penalty kick for the under-20 team in the final of the 2022 Sud Ladies Cup. She made her second World Cup appearance at the 2022 FIFA U-20 Women's World Cup. She was named to the under-23 team roster for preseason friendlies against National Women's Soccer League clubs in 2023.

== Personal life ==
DellaPeruta is the daughter of Barbara and Adam DellaPeruta and has a younger sister, Tori, who is also a soccer player. She is in a relationship with fellow soccer player Peter Stroud.

== Honors and awards ==
North Carolina Tar Heels

- Atlantic Coast Conference: 2020, 2022

United States U-15

- CONCACAF Girls' U-15 Championship: 2016

United States U-17

- CONCACAF Women's U-17 Championship: 2018

United States U-20

- CONCACAF Women's U-20 Championship: 2020, 2022
- Sud Ladies Cup: 2022

Individual

- ACC all-freshman team: 2020
