= Malia Berkely =

American soccer player (born 1998)

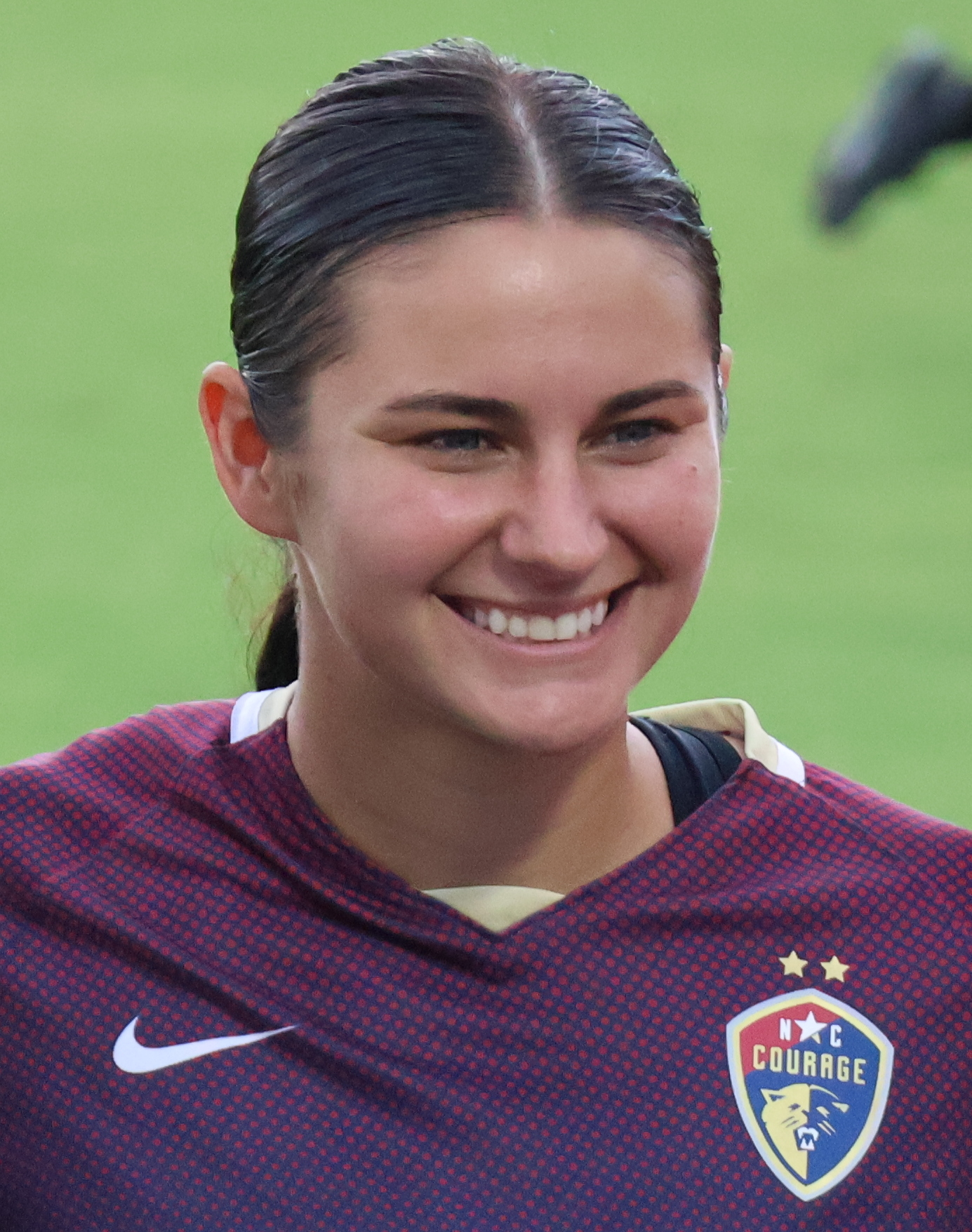
- Berkely with the North Carolina Courage in 2023

Personal information
- Full name: Malia Nicole Berkely
- Date of birth: February 13, 1998 (age 28)
- Place of birth: Liberty Township, Ohio, U.S.
- Height: 5 ft 8 in (1.73 m)
- Position: Center back

Team information
- Current team: Houston Dash
- Number: 10

College career
Years	Team	Apps	(Gls)
2016–2020	Florida State Seminoles	84	(4)

Senior career*
Years	Team	Apps	(Gls)
2021	Bordeaux	10	(1)
2022–2025	North Carolina Courage	69	(1)
2025–	Houston Dash	22	(0)

International career
2019	United States U23	3	(0)
- * Club domestic league appearances and goals as of 03:10, November 8, 2026 (UTC)

Malia Nicole Berkely (born February 13, 1998) is an American professional soccer player who plays as a center back for the Houston Dash of the National Women's Soccer League (NWSL). She played college soccer for the Florida State Seminoles, winning the 2018 national championship, and was twice named first-team All-American and Atlantic Coast Conference (ACC) Defensive Player of the Year. After starting her professional career with Bordeaux, she joined the North Carolina Courage in 2022.

== Early life ==
Berkely was raised in Hamilton, Ohio, the daughter of Todd and Nicole Berkely. She began playing soccer at age four with the YMCA. Her father coached her high school team at Father Stephen T. Badin High School, where scored 66 goals in four years and won Ohio Division III state titles in 2013 and 2014. She played club soccer for Fairfield Optimist and committed to Florida State as a sophomore in 2014. She was named the Ohio Gatorade Player of the Year in 2015 and 2016.

== College career ==
Berkely played for the Florida State Seminoles from 2016 to 2020. She helped the team win the NCAA tournament in 2018 and was twice named ACC Defensive Player of the Year (2019 and 2020) and first-team All-American (2019 and 2020).

== Club career ==
=== Bordeaux ===
Berkely joined FC Girondins de Bordeaux in January 2021 on an 18-month contract. She appeared in 10 games, scoring one goal, before Bordeaux transferred her with six months remaining on her contract.

=== North Carolina Courage ===
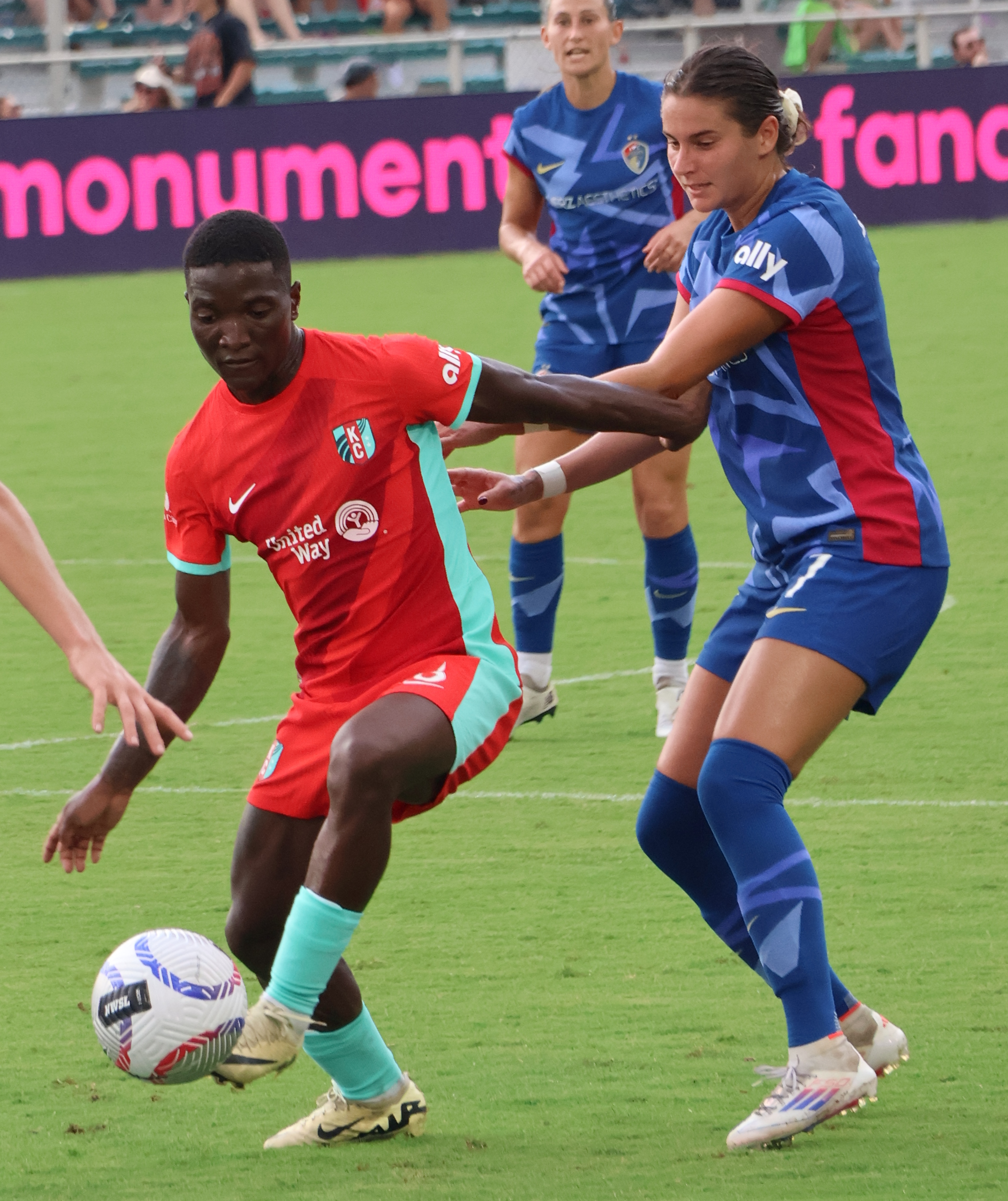
Berkely defending Temwa Chawinga in 2024

In December 2021, Berkely was transferred the North Carolina Courage for a fee, and the Courage signed her to a three-year contract. On March 19, 2022, she started the first game of the 2022 NWSL Challenge Cup and assisted on an Abby Erceg goal to defeat NJ/NY Gotham FC 2–0. She scored her first goal for the Courage in a 2–2 draw to the Washington Spirit in the Challenge Cup on April 23. She went on to start in the Challenge Cup final, which the Courage won over the Washington Spirit.

Berkely became one of the Courage's starting center backs alongside Kaleigh Kurtz after the departure of Abby Erceg in 2023. On July 21, the Courage extended Berkely's contract for three years, keeping her with the team through 2026. She helped win a second Challenge Cup in 2023, defeating Racing Louisville in the final. She led the NWSL in passing accuracy (89.8%) in the 2023 regular season.

Berkely became the first NWSL player to provide three assists in a half in a 4–1 win over the San Diego Wave on September 8, 2024.

=== Houston Dash ===
On September 12, 2025, the Houston Dash acquired Berkely from the Courage, along with $75,000 in intra-league transfer funds, in exchange for Natalie Jacobs. Berkely made her Dash debut on September 19, starting in a 1–0 victory over Chicago Stars FC.

== International career ==
Berkely trained with the United States youth national team at the under-14, under-15, under-17, under-18, and under-19 level. During college, she appeared for the under-23 team in a friendly tournament in 2019.

== Style of play ==
Primarily a center back in the NWSL, Berkely was deployed in a variety of positions in her youth: she played as a central midfielder, attacking midfielder, striker, and center back during high school; as a central midfielder, outside back, and center back with the youth national team; and in multiple positions but eventually just center back in college. She passes well and often dribbles forward to develop the attack from the back line.

== Personal life ==
Berkely married RJ Gerhardt on December 17, 2023. She earned a martial arts black belt earlier that year.

== Honors ==
Florida State Seminoles

- NCAA Division I Women's Soccer Championship: 2018

North Carolina Courage

- NWSL Challenge Cup: 2022, 2023
