= ACC women's soccer tournament =

- Atlantic Coast Conference women's soccer championship
- Sport: College soccer
- Conference: Atlantic Coast Conference
- Number of teams: 6
- Format: Single-elimination
- Current stadium: WakeMed Soccer Park
- Current location: Cary, North Carolina
- Played: 1988–present
- Last contest: 2026
- Current champion: North Carolina (23rd title)
- Most championships: North Carolina (23 titles)
- TV partner(s): ACC Network, ESPNU
- Official website: theacc.com/wsoc

The ACC women's soccer tournament is the conference championship tournament in college soccer for the Atlantic Coast Conference (ACC). The tournament has been held every year since 1988. It is a single-elimination tournament and seeding is based on regular season records. The winner, declared conference champion, receives the conference's automatic bid to the NCAA Division I women's soccer championship.

Historically, there have been eight teams to qualify for the tournament. However between 2014 and 2016, the tournament was reduced to 4 teams from the usual 8 teams. The tournament was reduced to six teams in 2021.

North Carolina is the most winning team of the ACC tournament with 23 conference titles.

== Champions ==
The following is a list of Atlantic Coast Conference (ACC) Tournament winners:

=== Finals ===
Key

- (1) – Title number
- a.e.t. – Match went to extra time
- p – Match decided by a penalty shootout after extra time
- – Winning team reached College Cup
- – Winning team won National Championship
- **Bold** – Winning team won **regular season**

=== Year by year ===
| Ed. | Year | Champion | Score | Runner-up | Venue | Tournament MVP |
|---|---|---|---|---|---|---|
| 1 | 1988 | **NC State** (1) | 1–1 (4–3 p) | North Carolina | Method Road Stadium • Raleigh, NC | Lindsay Brecher, NC State |
| 2 | 1989 | **North Carolina** (1) | 5–3 | NC State | Duke Soccer Stadium • Durham, NC | Mia Hamm, North Carolina |
| 3 | 1990 | **North Carolina** (2) | 2–0 | Virginia | University Hall Field • Charlottesville, VA | Kristine Lilly, North Carolina |
| 4 | 1991 | **North Carolina** (3) | 5–1 | NC State | Fetzer Field • Chapel Hill, NC | Tisha Venturini, North Carolina |
| 5 | 1992 | **North Carolina** (4) | 3–1 | Duke | Duke Soccer Stadium • Durham, NC | Mia Hamm, North Carolina |
| 6 | 1993 | **North Carolina** (5) | 4–1 | Duke | Method Road Stadium • Raleigh, NC | Tisha Venturini, North Carolina |
| 7 | 1994 | **North Carolina** (6) | 4–2 | Duke | Fetzer Field • Chapel Hill, NC | Tisha Venturini, North Carolina |
| 8 | 1995 | **North Carolina** (7) | 3–0 | Maryland | Ludwig Field • College Park, MD | Nel Fettig, North Carolina |
| 9 | 1996 | **North Carolina** (8) | 4–1 | Clemson | Riggs Field • Clemson, SC | Robin Confer, North Carolina |
| 10 | 1997 | **North Carolina** (9) | 4–0 | Maryland | Spry Stadium • Winston-Salem, NC | Cindy Parlow, North Carolina |
| 11 | 1998 | **North Carolina** (10) | 1–0 | Clemson | World of Sports • Orlando, FL | Tiffany Roberts, North Carolina |
| 12 | 1999 | **North Carolina** (11) | 3–0 | Wake Forest | Fetzer Field • Chapel Hill, NC | Lindsay Stoecker, North Carolina |
| 13 | 2000 | **North Carolina** (12) | 4–0 | Duke | Koskinen Stadium • Durham, NC | Meredith Florance, North Carolina |
| 14 | 2001 | **North Carolina** (13) | 4–0 | Florida State | Spry Stadium • Winston-Salem, NC | Alyssa Ramsey, North Carolina |
| 15 | 2002 | **North Carolina** (14) | 6–0 | Clemson | Seminole Complex • Tallahassee, Fl | Leslie Gaston, North Carolina |
| 16 | 2003 | **North Carolina** (15) | 3–2 | Florida State | SAS Soccer Complex • Cary, NC | Lindsay Tarpley, North Carolina |
| 17 | 2004 | Virginia (1) | 1–1 (5–4 p) | North Carolina | SAS Soccer Complex • Cary, NC | Christina de Vries, Virginia; Sarah Huffman, Virginia |
| 18 | 2005 | **North Carolina** (16) | 4–1 | Virginia | SAS Soccer Complex • Cary, NC | Kacey White, North Carolina |
| 19 | 2006 | **North Carolina** (17) | 2–1 (a.e.t.) | Florida State | SAS Soccer Complex • Cary, NC | Elizabeth Guess, North Carolina |
| 20 | 2007 | **North Carolina** (18) | 1–0 | Florida State | World of Sports • Lake Buena Vista, FL | Nikki Washington, North Carolina |
| 21 | 2008 | **North Carolina** (19) | 3–0 | Virginia Tech | WakeMed Soccer Park • Cary, NC | Casey Nogueira, North Carolina |
| 22 | 2009 | North Carolina (20) | 3–0 | Florida State | WakeMed Soccer Park • Cary, NC | Casey Nogueira, North Carolina |
| 23 | 2010 | Wake Forest (1) | 1–1 (3–1 p) | Maryland | WakeMed Soccer Park • Cary, NC | Aubrey Bledsoe, Wake Forest |
| 24 | 2011 | Florida State (1) | 1–1 (3–1 p) | Wake Forest | WakeMed Soccer Park • Cary, NC | Kelsey Wys, Florida State |
| 25 | 2012 | Virginia (2) | 4–0 | Maryland | WakeMed Soccer Park • Cary, NC | Morgan Brian, Virginia |
| 26 | 2013 | Florida State (2) | 1–0 | Virginia Tech | WakeMed Soccer Park • Cary, NC | Kassey Kallman, Florida State |
| 27 | 2014 | Florida State (3) | 1–0 | Virginia | UNCG Stadium • Greensboro, NC | Dagny Brynjarsdottir, Florida State |
| 28 | 2015 | Florida State (4) | 2–2 (7–6 p) | Virginia | WakeMed Soccer Park • Cary, NC | Natalia Kuikka, Florida State |
| 29 | 2016 | Florida State (5) | 0–0 (4–3 p) | North Carolina | MUSC Stadium • Charleston, SC | Cassie Miller, Florida State |
| 30 | 2017 | North Carolina (21) | 1–0 | Duke | MUSC Stadium • Charleston, SC | Alessia Russo, North Carolina |
| 31 | 2018 | Florida State (6) | 3–2 | North Carolina | WakeMed Soccer Park • Cary, NC | Dallas Dorosy, Florida State |
| 32 | 2019 | **North Carolina** (22) | 2–1 (a.e.t.) | Virginia | WakeMed Soccer Park • Cary, NC | Alessia Russo, North Carolina |
| 33 | 2020 | **Florida State** (7) | 3–2 | North Carolina | WakeMed Soccer Park • Cary, NC | Clara Robbins, Florida State |
| 34 | 2021 | Florida State (8) | 1–0 | Virginia | WakeMed Soccer Park • Cary, NC | Clara Robbins, Florida State |
| 35 | 2022 | **Florida State** (9) | 2–1 | North Carolina | WakeMed Soccer Park • Cary, NC | Jenna Nighswonger, Florida State |
| 36 | 2023 | **Florida State** (10) | 2–1 | Clemson | WakeMed Soccer Park • Cary, NC | Onyi Echegini, Florida State |
| 37 | 2024 | Florida State (11) | 3–2 | North Carolina | WakeMed Soccer Park • Cary, NC | Taylor Huff, Florida State |
| 38 | 2025 | **Stanford** | 2–2 (5–4 p) | Notre Dame | WakeMed Soccer Park • Cary, NC | Jasmine Aikey, Stanford |
| 39 | 2026 | North Carolina (23) | 2–0 | Virginia | WakeMed Soccer Park • Cary, NC | Bella Devey, North Carolina |

=== By school ===
Through 2026

| School | Apps | Last | W | L | T | % | Finals | Titles | Winning years |
|---|---|---|---|---|---|---|---|---|---|
| Boston College | 11 | 2018 | 2 | 11 | 1 | .179 | — | — | — |
| California | 0 | None | 0 | 0 | 0 | – | — | — | — |
| Clemson | 20 | 2023 | 14 | 20 | 3 | .419 | 4 | — | — |
| Duke | 36 | 2026 | 18 | 34 | 4 | .357 | 5 | — | — |
| Florida State | 32 | 2026 | 32 | 18 | 12 | .613 | 16 | 11 | 2011, 2013–2016, 2018, 2020–2024 |
| Louisville | 4 | 2025 | 0 | 4 | 0 | .000 | — | — | — |
| Maryland | 23 | 2013 | 12 | 22 | 4 | .368 | 4 | — | — |
| Miami | 5 | 2016 | 0 | 3 | 2 | — | — | — | |
| North Carolina | 37 | 2026 | 74 | 10 | 6 | .856 | 30 | 23 | 1989–2003, 2005–2009, 2017, 2019, 2026 |
| NC State | 21 | 2019 | 7 | 18 | 3 | .304 | 3 | 1 | 1988 |
| Notre Dame | 12 | 2026 | 2 | 10 | 3 | .233 | 1 | — | — |
| Pittsburgh | 2 | 2023 | 1 | 1 | 1 | .500 | — | — | — |
| SMU | 0 | None | 0 | 0 | 0 | – | — | — | — |
| Stanford | 1 | 2025 | 1 | 0 | 1 | .750 | 1 | 1 | 2025 |
| Syracuse | 0 | None | 0 | 0 | 0 | – | — | — | — |
| Virginia | 37 | 2026 | 26 | 28 | 10 | .484 | 9 | 2 | 2004, 2012 |
| Virginia Tech | 9 | 2024 | 4 | 9 | 2 | .333 | 2 | — | — |
| Wake Forest | 24 | 2026 | 11 | 18 | 7 | .403 | 3 | 1 | 2010 |

Teams in italics are former members of the Atlantic Coast Conference.

=== Pre-tournament champions ===
Prior to 1988, the champion was determined based on regular season play.

| Season | Champion | Runner-up |
|---|---|---|
| 1987 | North Carolina | NC State/Virginia |
