= 2016 Atlantic Coast Conference women's soccer season =

- League: NCAA Division I
- Sport: Soccer
- Duration: August, 2016 – November, 2016
- Teams: 14

2017 NWSL College Draft
- Top draft pick: Christina Gibbons
- Picked by: Seattle Reign FC, 5th Overall

Regular season
- Season champions: Notre Dame; Clemson
- Runners-up: Duke

Tournament
- Champions: Florida State
- Runners-up: North Carolina
- Finals MVP: Cassie Miller, Florida State Seminoles

ACC women's soccer seasons
- ← 2015 2017 →

2016 ACC women's soccer standings
	Conf.						Overall
Team	W		L		T	PCT	W		L		T	PCT
#21 Notre Dame ‍†‍‍^{y}	7	–	1	–	2	.800	13	–	3	–	5	.738
No. 12 Clemson ‍†‍‍^{y}	7	–	1	–	2	.800	14	–	5	–	4	.696
No. 7 Duke ‍‍‍^{y}	7	–	2	–	1	.750	15	–	4	–	3	.750
#4 North Carolina ‍‍‍^{y}	6	–	2	–	2	.700	16	–	3	–	4	.783
No. 11 Virginia ‍‍‍^{y}	6	–	2	–	2	.700	15	–	5	–	2	.727
No. 14 Florida State ‍‍‡‍^{y}	6	–	2	–	2	.700	14	–	4	–	4	.727
Miami ‍‍‍	5	–	5	–	0	.500	10	–	8	–	1	.553
No. 24 NC State ‍‍‍^{y}	4	–	5	–	1	.450	11	–	9	–	2	.545
Virginia Tech ‍‍‍	3	–	4	–	3	.450	11	–	5	–	3	.658
Louisville ‍‍‍	2	–	5	–	3	.350	7	–	7	–	4	.500
Boston College ‍‍‍	3	–	7	–	0	.300	11	–	8	–	1	.575
Wake Forest ‍‍‍	2	–	8	–	0	.200	10	–	8	–	0	.556
Syracuse ‍‍‍	1	–	7	–	2	.200	8	–	8	–	3	.500
Pittsburgh ‍‍‍	1	–	9	–	0	.100	2	–	15	–	1	.139
† – Conference champion ‡ – 2016 ACC Tournament champion y – Invited to the NCAA tournament As of 2016-7-2; Rankings from NSCAA

The 2016 Atlantic Coast Conference women's soccer season was the 28th season of women's varsity soccer in the conference.

The Virginia Cavaliers are the defending regular season champions. The Florida State Seminoles are the defending ACC tournament Champions.

== Changes from 2015 ==
There were no coaching changes from 2015 to 2016.

== Teams ==
=== Stadiums and locations ===
Team	Stadium	Capacity
Boston College Eagles	Newton Soccer Complex	2,500
Clemson Tigers	Riggs Field	6,500
Duke Blue Devils	Koskinen Stadium	7,000
Florida State Seminoles	Seminole Soccer Complex	1,600
Louisville Cardinals	Lynn Stadium	5,300
Miami Hurricanes	Cobb Stadium	500
NC State Wolfpack	Method Road	3,000
North Carolina Tar Heels	Fetzer Field	5,025
Notre Dame Fighting Irish	Alumni Stadium	2,500
Pittsburgh Panthers	Ambrose Urbanic Field	735
Syracuse Orange	SU Soccer Stadium	5,000
Virginia Cavaliers	Klöckner Stadium	8,000
Virginia Tech Hokies	Thompson Field	2,500
Wake Forest Demon Deacons	Spry Stadium	3,000

1. Georgia Tech does not sponsor women's soccer

=== Personnel ===
Team	Head coach	Captain
Boston College Eagles	(United States) Alison Foley	Hayley Dowd & McKenzie Meehan
Clemson Tigers	(United States) Eddie Radwanski	Emily Byorth, Gabby Byorth, Abby Jones, & Clarie Wagner
Duke Blue Devils	(United States) Robbie Church	Christina Gibbons & Lizzy Raben
Florida State	(United States) Mark Krikorian	Kirsten Crowley
Louisville Cardinals	(United States) Karen Ferguson-Dayes	Caroline Kimble & Inger Katrine Bjerke
Miami Hurricanes	(United States) Mary-Frances Monroe	Gianna Dal Pozzo
NC State Wolfpack	(United States) Tim Santoro	Jackie Stengel & Hannah Keogh
North Carolina Tar Heels	(India) Anson Dorrance	Hanna Gardner
Notre Dame Fighting Irish	(United States) Theresa Romagnolo	Sandra Yu
Pittsburgh Panthers	(United States) Greg Miller	Siobhan McDonough & Emma Pozzulo
Syracuse Orange	(England) Phil Wheddon	Stephanie Skilton & Jackie Firenze
Virginia Cavaiers	(United States) Steve Swanson	-
Virginia Tech Hokies	(United States) Charles Adair	-
Wake Forest Demon Deacons	(United States) Tony da Luz	-

== Regular season ==
=== Rankings ===
==== NSCAA ====
Legend
Increase in ranking
Decrease in ranking
Not ranked previous week

	Pre	Wk 1	Wk 2	Wk 3	Wk 4	Wk 5	Wk 6	Wk 7	Wk 8	Wk 9	Wk 10	Wk 11	Wk 12	Final
Boston College	RV	RV	RV	RV	RV	RV	RV	RV	RV					
Clemson	14	8	6	13	13	13	13	12	18	17	14	9	12	12
Duke	3	2	7	6	9	7	10	9	4	4	6	12	14	7
Florida State	1	1	1	1	3	3	2	2	9	9	8	13	10	14
Louisville														
Miami														
North Carolina	9	9	8	8	7	18	16	15	11	18	16	10	6	4
NC State														
Notre Dame	13	12	23	20	20	24	22	20	20	13	12	6	11	21
Pittsburgh														
Syracuse														
Virginia	4	4	3	3	5	2	7	8	5	8	7	14	15	11
Virginia Tech	17	18	16	18	17	19	RV	RV	24	25	RV	RV	RV	
Wake Forest														

==== Top Drawer Soccer ====
Legend
Increase in ranking
Decrease in ranking
Not ranked previous week

	Pre	Wk 1	Wk 2	Wk 3	Wk 4	Wk 5	Wk 6	Wk 7	Wk 8	Wk 9	Wk 10	Wk 11	Wk 12	Wk 13	Wk 14	Wk 15	Final
Boston College	25	24	23	13	11	17											
Clemson	10	10	9	9	14	15	11	12	12	15	15	12	10	13	11	13	13
Duke	3	3	5	5	8	7	6	6	3	3	6	11	15	13	5	6	6
Florida State	2	2	2	2	2	4	3	4	4	13	11	9	12	9	9	19	19
Louisville																	
Miami																	
North Carolina	12	12	10	7	7	9	14	13	13	14	18	16	9	12	10	7	4
NC State																	23
Notre Dame			RV		25	25	RV	21	19	19	12	10	6	10	21	22	22
Pittsburgh																	
Syracuse																	
Virginia	6	6	4	3	3	5	2	8	8	4	8	7	13	16	14	15	15
Virginia Tech	20	20	18	12	17	16	23	RV	NR	RV	RV	RV					
Wake Forest																	

== Postseason ==
=== ACC tournament ===
Semifinals
1	Notre Dame	1
4	North Carolina	2
2	Clemson	0
6	Florida State	1

Final
4	North Carolina	0 (3)
6	Florida State	0 (4)

=== NCAA tournament ===
Seed	Bracket	School	1st round	2nd round	Round of 16	Quarterfinals	Final Four	Championship
2	South Carolina	North Carolina	W 3–0 vs. Liberty – (Chapel Hill, NC)	W 2–0 vs. Kansas – (Chapel Hill, NC)	W 1–0 vs. Clemson – (Chapel Hill, NC)	L 0–1 vs. South Carolina – (Columbia, SC)		
2	West Virginia	Notre Dame	T 0–0 ^{L, 4–5 PK} vs. SIU Edwardsville – (Notre Dame, IN)					
3	Stanford	Virginia	W 4–1 vs. Monmouth – (Charlottesville, VA)	W 3–0 vs. Penn State – (Washington D.C.)	L 0–2 vs. Georgetown – (Washington, D.C.)			
3	Stanford	Florida State	W 4–0 vs. Samford – (Tallahassee, FL)	L 1–2 vs. Utah – (Los Angeles, CA)				
3	South Carolina	Clemson	W 1–0 vs. Northeastern – (Clemson, SC)	T 0–0 ^{W, 4–2 PK} vs. Arkansas – (Chapel Hill, NC)	L 1–0 vs. North Carolina – (Chapel Hill, NC)			
3	West Virginia	Duke	W 3–0 vs. Charlotte – (Durham, NC)	W 3–1 vs. Illinois State – (Durham, NC)	W 1–0 vs. Northwestern – (Durham, NC)	L 0–1 vs. West Virginia – (Morgantown, WV)		
-	Stanford	NC State	T 0–0 ^{W, 4–2 PK} vs. Minnesota – (St. Paul, Minnesota)	W 1–0 vs. Pepperdine – (Stanford, CA)	L 0–3 vs. Santa Clara – (Stanford, CA)			

== All-ACC awards and teams ==
2016 ACC Women's Soccer Individual Awards
Award	Recipient(s)
Offensive Player of the Year	Alexis Shaffer, University of Virginia
Coach of the Year	Eddie Radwanski, Clemson University
Midfielder of the Year	Alexis Shaffer, University of Virginia
Defensive Player of the Year	Christina Gibbons, Duke University
Freshman of the Year	Bridgette Andrzejewski, University of North Carolina

2016 ACC Women's Soccer All-Conference Teams
First Team	Second Team	Third Team	All-Freshman Team
McKenzie Meehan, GS, F, Boston College; Catrina Atanda Sr., M, Clemson; Kailen Sheridan, Sr., GK, Clemson; Christina Gibbons, Sr., D, Duke; Toni Payne, Sr., F, Duke; Kirsten Crowley Sr., D, Florida State; Gracie Lachowecki Sr., F, Miami; Bridgette Andrzejewski, Fr., F, North Carolina; Kaleigh Olmsted Sr., F, Notre Dame; Alexis Shaffer Sr., M, Virginia; Murielle Tiernan Sr., F, Virginia Tech	Hayley Dowd Sr., F, Boston College; Sam Staab, So., D, Clemson; Imani Dorsey, Jr., F, Duke; Deyna Castellanos, Fr., F, Florida State; Megan Connolly, So, M, Florida State; Natalia Kuikka, So., D, Florida State; Cassie Miller, Jr., GK, Florida State; Megan Buckingham, Jr., M, North Carolina; Jennifer Westendorf, Fr., F, Notre Dame; Kristen McNabb, GS, D, Virginia; Sarah Teegarden Sr., M, Wake Forest	Claire Wagner Sr., D, Clemson; Ella Stevens, Fr., M, Duke; Emma Koivisto, Jr., D, Florida State; Gaby Vincent, So., M, Louisville; Tziarra King, Fr., M, NC State; Taylor Klawunder Jr., M, Notre Dame; Kaela Little Sr., GK, Notre Dame; Sandra Yu Sr., M, Notre Dame; Alissa Gorzak, Fr., F, Virginia; Veronica Latsko, Jr., F, Virginia; Candace Cephers Sr., M, Virginia Tech	Ella Stevens, Fr., M, Duke; Malia Berkely, Fr., D, Florida State; Deyna Castellanos, Fr., F, Florida State; Kristen McFarland, Fr., F, Florida State; Kristina Fisher, Fr., M, Miami; Bridgette Andrzejewski, Fr., F, North Carolina; Tziarra King, Fr., M, NC State; Kia Rankin, Fr., F, NC State; Jennifer Westendorf, Fr., M, Notre Dame; Alissa Gorzak, Fr, F, Virginia; Zoe Morse, Fr., M, Virginia

== Draft picks ==
The ACC had 10 total players selected in the 2017 NWSL College Draft. There was 1 player selected in the first round, 2 players selected in the second round, 3 players selected in the third round, and 4 players selected in the fourth round.

FW	Forward	MF	Midfielder	DF	Defender	GK	Goalkeeper

Player	Team	Round	Pick #	Position	School
(United States) Christina Gibbons	Seattle Reign FC	1st	5	MF	Duke
(United States) Toni Payne	FC Kansas City	2nd	13	FW	Duke
(United States) Claire Wagner	North Carolina Courage	2nd	20	DF	Clemson
(Canada) Kailen Sheridan	Sky Blue FC	3rd	23	GK	Clemson
(United States) Alexis Schaffer	FC Kansas City	3rd	25	MF	Virginia
(United States) Catrina Atanda	Sky Blue FC	3rd	30	MF	Clemson
(United States) McKenzie Meehan	Sky Blue FC	4th	34	FW	Boston College
(United States) Cameron Castleberry	Washington Spirit	4th	36	MF	North Carolina
(United States) Kristen McNabb	Washington Spirit	4th	36	MF	Virginia
(United States) Hayley Dowd	Boston Breakers	4th	38	FW	Boston College
