= 2013 Clemson Tigers women's soccer team =

American college soccer season

2013 Clemson Tigers women's soccer
- Conference: Atlantic Coast Conference
- Record: 7–8–4 (4–7–2 ACC)
- Head coach: Eddie Radwanski (3rd season)
- Assistant coaches: Jeff Robbins (3rd season); Siri Mullinix (3rd season)
- Home stadium: Riggs Field

The 2013 Clemson Tigers women's soccer team represented Clemson University during the 2013 NCAA Division I women's soccer season. The Tigers were led by head coach Ed Radwanski, in his third season. They played home games at Riggs Field.

== Roster ==
Updated May 22, 2018

Note: Flags indicate national team as defined under FIFA eligibility rules; some limited exceptions apply. Players may hold more than one non-FIFA nationality.

No.	Pos.	Nation	Player
1	GK	(Canada) CAN	Kailen Sheridan
2	DF	(United States) USA	Erica Kim
3	MF	(United States) USA	Tina Shakes
5	FW	(United States) USA	Deana Sherry
6	MF	(United States) USA	Savannah Coiner
7	MF	(United States) USA	Tabitha Padgett
8	DF	(United States) USA	Page Reckert
9	DF	(United States) USA	Stacey Huddleston
10	MF	(United States) USA	Vanessa Laxgang
11	MF	(United States) USA	Catrina Atanda
12	MF	(United States) USA	Katelyn Reeve
13	MF	(United States) USA	Morgan Campbell
14	MF	(United States) USA	Allie Kington
15	MF	(United States) USA	Hailey Karg

No.	Pos.	Nation	Player
16	MF	(United States) USA	Brittany Beaumont
17	MF	(United States) USA	Kylie Tawney
18	MF	(United States) USA	Claire Wagner
19	MF	(United States) USA	Jenna Polonsky
20	DF	(United States) USA	Jenna Weston
21	MF	(United States) USA	Abby Jones
22	DF	(United States) USA	Haley Hunt
23	MF	(United States) USA	Tori Andreski
26	GK	(United States) USA	Hunter Rittgers
27	DF	(United States) USA	Gabby Byorth
28	DF	(United States) USA	Emily Byorth
29	MF	(United States) USA	Katie Sprouse
30	GK	(United States) USA	Morgan Hert

== Schedule ==
Date Time, TV	Rank^{#}	Opponent^{#}	Result	Record	Site City, State
Exhibition
August 17*		Alabama		– (–)	Georgia Gwinnett College; Lawrenceville, GA
Regular season
August 23*		at Auburn	T 0–0 ^{2OT}	0–0–1 (0-0-0)	Auburn Soccer Complex (837); Auburn, AL
August 25*		Furman	W 1–0	1–0–1 (0-0-0)	Riggs Field (1,282); Clemson, SC
August 30*		at USF	T 1–1 ^{2OT}	1–0–2 (0-0-0)	Corbett Soccer Stadium (1,015); Tampa, FL
September 6*		No. 11 South Carolina; Rivalry	L 1–2	1–1–2 (0-0-0)	Riggs Field (991); Clemson, SC
September 8*		Davidson	W 2–0	2–1–2 (0-0-0)	Riggs Field (201); Clemson, SC
September 12		No. 21 Maryland	L 1–2 ^{OT}	2–2–2 (0-1-0)	Riggs Field (422); Clemson, SC
September 15		Boston College	W 2–1	3–2–2 (1-1-0)	Riggs Field (203); Clemson, SC
September 15*		Pittsburgh	W 2–0	4–2–2 (2-1-0)	Riggs Field (178); Clemson, SC
September 22*		Alabama A&M	W 14–0	5–2–2 (2–1–0)	Riggs Field (133); Clemson, SC
September 26		at Syracuse	W 1–0	6–2–2 (3–1–0)	SU Soccer Stadium (337); Syracuse, NY
September 29		No. 3 Florida State	T 1–1 ^{2OT}	6–2–3 (3–1–1)	Riggs Field (302); Clemson, SC
October 3		at No. 12 Virginia Tech	L 0–1 ^{OT}	6–3–3 (3–2–1)	Virginia Tech Soccer Stadium (507); Blacksburg, VA
October 6		at No. 1 Virginia	L 0–3	6–4–3 (3–3–1)	Klöckner Stadium (1,902); Charlottesville, VA
October 13		at NC State	W 1–0	7–4–3 (4–3–1)	Dail Soccer Field (330); Raleigh, NC
October 17		Duke	T 0–0 ^{2OT}	7–4–4 (4–3–2)	Riggs Field (412); Clemson, SC
October 20		at No. 19 Wake Forest	L 0–1	7–5–4 (4–4–2)	Spry Stadium (379); Winston-Salem, NC
October 24		at No. 5 North Carolina	L 0–2	7–6–4 (4–5–2)	Fetzer Field (914); Chapel Hill, NC
October 27		No. 12 Notre Dame; Senior Day	L 0–2	7–7–4 (4–6–2)	Riggs Field (797); Clemson, SC
October 31		at Miami	L 1–2	7–8–4 (4–7–2)	Cobb Stadium (273); Coral Gables, FL
*Non-conference game. ^{#}Rankings from United Soccer Coaches. (#) Tournament seedings in parentheses.
