= Soccer at the 1999 Pan American Games – Women's tournament =

1999 Pan American Games Women's soccer tournament
Tournament details
- Host country: Canada
- City: Winnipeg
- Dates: 23 July – 5 August
- Teams: 5

Final positions
- Champions: United States (1st title)
- Runners-up: Mexico
- Third place: Costa Rica
- Fourth place: Canada

The women's football (soccer) tournament at the 1999 Pan American Games was the inaugural edition of a women's football competition at Pan American Games. This first edition was held in Winnipeg between July 23 and August 7.

The tournament was won by the United States after beating Mexico 1–0 in the final.

The women's competition was held for the first time.

== Group stage ==
Pos	Team	Pld	W	D	L	GF	GA	GD	Pts	Qualification
1	United States	4	3	1	0	19	2	+17	10	Semi-finals
2	Canada	4	3	0	1	13	6	+7	9	Semi-finals
3	Mexico	4	2	1	1	13	6	+7	7	Semi-finals
4	Costa Rica	4	1	0	3	3	14	−11	3	Semi-finals
5	Trinidad and Tobago	4	0	0	4	3	23	−20	0	

23 July 1999

United States	6–0	Costa Rica
Wallis 2'; Sellers 6'; Molinaro 7', 68'; Patrick 78'; Reddick 78'	Report

23 July 1999

Canada	7–1	Trinidad and Tobago
Haxton 5', 35'; Tanaka 13'; Barradas 16', 21', 40'; Rustad 79'	Report	Charles 72'

Red River College, Winnipeg
Attendance: 300

25 July 1999

United States	1–1	Mexico
Wallis 52'	Report	Leyva 89'

25 July 1999

Canada	3–0	Costa Rica
Barradas 2', 43'; Hemsley 84'	Report

Red River College, Winnipeg
Referee: Amy Loughran

27 July 1999

Trinidad and Tobago	0–2	Costa Rica

27 July 1999

Canada	3–2	Mexico
Wiebe 37'; Barradas 45+', 78'	Report	Mora 35', 58'

Red River College, Winnipeg
Attendance: 1,200
Referee: Amy Loughran

29 July 1999

United States	9–1	Trinidad and Tobago
Kraus 1'; Wallis 12', 22', 59'; Lewis 44'; Patrick 48', 73', 82'; Molinaro 85'	Report	Charles 47'

29 July 1999

Costa Rica	1–5	Mexico

31 July 1999

Mexico	5–1	Trinidad and Tobago

31 July 1999

United States	3–0	Canada
Lindsey 7'; Reddick 43'; Patrick 56'	Report 1 Report 2

Red River College, Winnipeg
Referee: Pierre Acouri

== Knockout stage ==
Semi-finals
August 2 – Winnipeg
United States	2
Costa Rica	0
August 2 – Winnipeg
Mexico	2 (5)
Canada	2 (3)

Final
August 5 – Winnipeg
United States	1
Mexico	0
Third place
August 4 – Winnipeg
Canada	1 (3)
Costa Rica	1 (4)

=== Semi finals ===
2 August 1999

United States	2–0	Costa Rica
Wallis 6'; Patrick 24'	Report

2 August 1999

Mexico	2–2	Canada
Leyva 81' ? 66' (o.g.)	Report	Tanaka 28'; Haxton 64'
Penalties
	5–3

Red River College, Winnipeg
Referee: Amy Loughran

=== Bronze medal match ===
4 August 1999

Canada	1–1	Costa Rica
Lee 27'	Report	Castro 67'
Penalties
	3–4

Red River College, Winnipeg

=== Gold Medal match ===
5 August 1999

United States	1–0	Mexico
Reddick 26'	Report

Team details

United States
Mexico

1999 Pan American Games winners

United States
First title
