= 2016 Clemson Tigers women's soccer team =

American college soccer season

2016 Clemson Tigers women's soccer

ACC Tournament, Semifinalists

NCAA Tournament, Sweet 16
- Conference: Atlantic Coast Conference
- U. Soc. Coaches poll: No. 12
- TopDrawerSoccer.com: No. 13
- Record: 14–5–4 (7–1–2 ACC)
- Head coach: Eddie Radwanski (6th season)
- Assistant coaches: Jeff Robbins (6th season); Siri Mullinix (6th season)
- Captains: Emily Byorth; Gabby Byorth; Abby Jones; Claire Wagner
- Home stadium: Riggs Field

2016 ACC women's soccer standings
| | Conf. | | | | | | Overall |
| Team | W | | L | | T | PCT | W | | L | | T | PCT |
|---|---|---|---|---|---|---|---|---|---|---|---|---|
| #21 Notre Dame ‍†‍‍^{y} | 7 | – | 1 | – | 2 | .800 | 13 | – | 3 | – | 5 | .738 |
| No. 12 Clemson ‍†‍‍^{y} | 7 | – | 1 | – | 2 | .800 | 14 | – | 5 | – | 4 | .696 |
| No. 7 Duke ‍‍‍^{y} | 7 | – | 2 | – | 1 | .750 | 15 | – | 4 | – | 3 | .750 |
| #4 North Carolina ‍‍‍^{y} | 6 | – | 2 | – | 2 | .700 | 16 | – | 3 | – | 4 | .783 |
| No. 11 Virginia ‍‍‍^{y} | 6 | – | 2 | – | 2 | .700 | 15 | – | 5 | – | 2 | .727 |
| No. 14 Florida State ‍‍‡‍^{y} | 6 | – | 2 | – | 2 | .700 | 14 | – | 4 | – | 4 | .727 |
| Miami ‍‍‍ | 5 | – | 5 | – | 0 | .500 | 10 | – | 8 | – | 1 | .553 |
| No. 24 NC State ‍‍‍^{y} | 4 | – | 5 | – | 1 | .450 | 11 | – | 9 | – | 2 | .545 |
| Virginia Tech ‍‍‍ | 3 | – | 4 | – | 3 | .450 | 11 | – | 5 | – | 3 | .658 |
| Louisville ‍‍‍ | 2 | – | 5 | – | 3 | .350 | 7 | – | 7 | – | 4 | .500 |
| Boston College ‍‍‍ | 3 | – | 7 | – | 0 | .300 | 11 | – | 8 | – | 1 | .575 |
| Wake Forest ‍‍‍ | 2 | – | 8 | – | 0 | .200 | 10 | – | 8 | – | 0 | .556 |
| Syracuse ‍‍‍ | 1 | – | 7 | – | 2 | .200 | 8 | – | 8 | – | 3 | .500 |
| Pittsburgh ‍‍‍ | 1 | – | 9 | – | 0 | .100 | 2 | – | 15 | – | 1 | .139 |
† – Conference champion ‡ – 2016 ACC Tournament champion y – Invited to the NCAA tournament As of 2016-7-2; Rankings from NSCAA

The 2016 Clemson Tigers women's soccer team represented Clemson University during the 2016 NCAA Division I women's soccer season. The Tigers were led by head coach Ed Radwanski, in his sixth season. Home games were played at Riggs Field. Clemson opened the season ranked 14th in the NSCAA Preseason Poll.

The Lady Tigers finished as ACC regular season co-champions with Notre Dame, capturing the second ACC regular season title in program history. Clemson also advanced to the third round (Sweet 16) of the NCAA tournament for the first time since 2006.

Coach Ed Radwanski was named ACC coach of the year in his sixth season with the team.

== Roster ==
Updated August 8, 2016

Note: Flags indicate national team as defined under FIFA eligibility rules; some limited exceptions apply. Players may hold more than one non-FIFA nationality.

| No. | Pos. | Nation | Player |
|---|---|---|---|
| 1 | GK | CAN | Kailen Sheridan |
| 2 | FW | USA | Miranda Weslake |
| 3 | MF | USA | Mac Smith |
| 4 | MF | USA | Katie Sprouse |
| 5 | DF | USA | Claire Wagner |
| 6 | MF | USA | Lauren Harkes |
| 7 | MF | USA | Shannon Horgan |
| 8 | FW | USA | Page Reckert |
| 10 | FW | USA | Alana Hockenhull |
| 11 | MF | USA | Catrina Atanda |
| 12 | MF | USA | Sarah Osborne |
| 13 | MF | USA | Dani Antieau |
| 14 | MF | USA | Allie Kington |
| 15 | DF | USA | Sam Staab |

| No. | Pos. | Nation | Player |
|---|---|---|---|
| 16 | FW | USA | Julie Mackin |
| 17 | GK | ENG | Sandy MacIver |
| 18 | MF | USA | Jeni Erickson |
| 19 | MF | USA | Jenna Polonsky |
| 20 | DF | USA | Jenna Weston |
| 21 | MF | USA | Abby Jones |
| 22 | MF | USA | Ellen Colborn |
| 23 | MF | USA | Tori Andreski |
| 25 | GK | USA | Rachele Manfre |
| 26 | GK | USA | Melanie Stiles |
| 27 | DF | USA | Gabby Byorth |
| 28 | DF | USA | Emily Byorth |
| 29 | DF | USA | Sarah Duckworth |
| 30 | FW | USA | Patrice DiPasquale |

Clemson had four players earn All – ACC postseason awards. Kailen Sheridan and Catrina Atanda were named first team All – ACC, Sam Staab was named second team All – ACC, and Claire Wagner was named third team All – ACC. For the 2016 Clemson named 4 co-captains for the team. Gabby Byorth, Emily Byorth, Abby Jones, and Claire Wagner (seniors) were named captains.

== Draft picks ==
The Tigers had three players drafted in the 2017 NWSL College Draft.

| Player | Team | Round | Pick # | Position |
|---|---|---|---|---|
| (United States) Claire Wagner | North Carolina Courage | 2nd | 20 | DF |
| (Canada) Kailen Sheridan | Sky Blue FC | 2nd | 23 | GK |
| (United States) Catrina Atanda | Sky Blue FC | 3rd | 40 | MF |

== Schedule ==
| Date Time, TV | Rank^{#} | Opponent^{#} | Result | Record | Site City, State |
Exhibition
| August 13*; 7:00 pm | No. 14 | at Tennessee | W 1–0 | 1–0–0 | Regal Stadium; Knoxville, Tennessee |
Regular season
| August 19*; 8:00 pm | No. 10 | at No. 12 Auburn | W 2–0 | 2–0–0 | Auburn Soccer Complex (826); Auburn, Alabama |
| August 21*; 7:00 pm | No. 10 | Georgia | W 3–1 | 3–0–0 | Riggs Field (1,120); Clemson, South Carolina |
| August 26*; 7:00 pm | No. 8 | at No. 7 West Virginia | L 0–1 | 3–1–0 | Dick Dlesk Soccer Stadium; Morgantown, West Virginia |
| August 28*; 2:00 pm | No. 8 | Elon | W 4–0 | 4–1–0 | Riggs Field (420); Clemson, South Carolina |
| September 02*; 7:00 pm | No. 6 | at No. 22 South Carolina; Rivalry | L 1–2 | 4–2–0 | Eugene E. Stone Stadium (3,838); Columbia, South Carolina |
| September 09*; 4:30 pm | No. 13 | High Point | W 4–1 | 5–2–0 | Riggs Field (538); Clemson, South Carolina |
| September 11*; 12:00 pm | No. 13 | Nebraska | W 5–2 | 6–2–0 | Riggs Field (263); Clemson, South Carolina |
| September 16; 7:00 pm | No. 13 | Wake Forest | W 2–1 | 7–2–0 (1–0–0) | Spry Stadium (873); Winston-Salem, North Carolina |
| September 18*; 1:00 pm | No. 13 | Presbyterian | W 9–0 | 8–2–0 (1–0–0) | Riggs Field; Clemson, South Carolina |
| September 22; 7:00 pm | No. 16 | Syracuse | W 4–0 | 9–2–0 (2–0–0) | Riggs Field; Clemson, South Carolina |
| September 25; 1:00 pm | No. 13 | No. 18 North Carolina | T 1–1 ^{2OT} | 9–2–1 (2–0–1) | Riggs Field; Clemson, South Carolina |
| October 01; 7:00 pm | No. 13 | Virginia Tech | T 2–2 ^{2OT} | 9–2–2 (2–0–2) | Virginia Tech Soccer Stadium; Blacksburg, Virginia |
| October 06; 7:00 pm | No. 12 | at No. 20 Notre Dame | L 0–1 | 9–3–2 (2–1–2) | Alumni Stadium (1,022); South Bend, Indiana |
| October 09; 1:00 pm | No. 15 | at No. 21 Louisville | W 1–0 | 10–3–2 (3–1–2) | Dr. Mark & Cindy Lynn Stadium (1,179); Louisville, Kentucky |
| October 14; 7:00 pm | No. 18 | Miami (FL) | W 1–0 | 11–3–2 (4–1–2) | Riggs Field (812); Clemson, South Carolina |
| October 20; 7:00 pm | No. 17 | Boston College | W 2–1 | 12–3–2 (5–1–2) | Riggs Field (471); Clemson, South Carolina |
| October 23; 1:00 pm | No. 17 | NC State; Senior Day | W 2–1 | 12–3–2 (6–1–2) | Riggs Field (646); Clemson, South Carolina |
| October 27; 7:00 pm | No. 13 | at No. 6 Duke | W 1–0 | 13–3–2 (7–1–2) | Koskinen Stadium (809); Durham, North Carolina |
ACC Tournament
| October 30; 1:00 pm | No. 14 | Miami (FL); ACC Quarterfinals | T 1–1 (5–4 PKs) ^{2OT} | 13–3–3 | Riggs Field (218); Clemson, SC |
| November 4; 8:00 pm | No. 9 | vs. No. 13 Florida State; ACC Semifinals | L 0–1 | 13–4–3 | MUSC Health Stadium (2,995); Charleston, SC |
NCAA Tournament
| November 13; 1:00 pm | No. 3 | Northeastern; NCAA First Round | W 1–0 | 14–4–3 | Riggs Field (229); Clemson, SC |
| November 18*; 3:00 pm | No. 3 | Arkansas; NCAA Second Round | T 0–0 (4–2 PK) ^{2OT} | 14–4–4 | Fetzer Field (1,917); Chapel Hill, NC |
| November 20*; 1:00 pm | No. 3 | at No. 2 North Carolina; NCAA Sweet 16 | L 0–1 | 14–5–4 | Fetzer Field (1,732); Chapel Hill, North Carolina |
*Non-conference game. ^{#}Rankings from United Soccer Coaches. (#) Tournament seedings in parentheses.

== Rankings ==
Ranking movements Legend: ██ Increase in ranking ██ Decrease in ranking
| | Week | | | | | | | | | | | | | | | | |
| Poll | Pre | 1 | 2 | 3 | 4 | 5 | 6 | 7 | 8 | 9 | 10 | 11 | 12 | 13 | 14 | 15 | Final |
|---|---|---|---|---|---|---|---|---|---|---|---|---|---|---|---|---|---|
| NSCAA | 14 | 8 | 6 | 13 | 13 | 13 | 13 | 12 | 18 | 17 | 14 | 9 | 12 | Not released | | | 12 |
| TopDrawer Soccer | 10 | 10 | 9 | 9 | 14 | 15 | 11 | 12 | 12 | 15 | 15 | 12 | 10 | 13 | 11 | 13 | 13 |
