= 2014 Clemson Tigers women's soccer team =

American college soccer season

2014 Clemson Tigers women's soccer

NCAA Tournament, First Round
- Conference: Atlantic Coast Conference
- Record: 13–3–3 (6–3–1 ACC)
- Head coach: Eddie Radwanski (4th season)
- Assistant coaches: Jeff Robbins (4th season); Siri Mullinix (4th season)
- Home stadium: Riggs Field

2014 Atlantic Coast Conference women's soccer standings
| | Conf. | | | | | | Overall |
| Team | W | | L | | T | PCT | W | | L | | T | PCT |
|---|---|---|---|---|---|---|---|---|---|---|---|---|
| No. 2 Florida State ‍†‍‡‍^{y} | 9 | – | 0 | – | 1 | .950 | 18 | – | 1 | – | 1 | .925 |
| No. 5 North Carolina ‍†‍‍^{y} | 9 | – | 0 | – | 1 | .950 | 12 | – | 3 | – | 2 | .765 |
| No. 4 Virginia ‍‍‍^{y} | 9 | – | 1 | – | 0 | .900 | 18 | – | 2 | – | 0 | .900 |
| No. 10 Notre Dame ‍‍‍^{y} | 7 | – | 2 | – | 1 | .750 | 12 | – | 5 | – | 2 | .684 |
| No. 21 Clemson ‍‍‍^{y} | 6 | – | 3 | – | 1 | .650 | 13 | – | 3 | – | 2 | .778 |
| No. 14 Virginia Tech ‍‍‍^{y} | 5 | – | 5 | – | 0 | .500 | 14 | – | 5 | – | 0 | .737 |
| Duke ‍‍‍ | 4 | – | 5 | – | 1 | .450 | 8 | – | 9 | – | 1 | .472 |
| Louisville ‍‍‍ | 3 | – | 5 | – | 2 | .400 | 7 | – | 9 | – | 2 | .444 |
| Wake Forest ‍‍‍ | 3 | – | 5 | – | 2 | .400 | 5 | – | 9 | – | 3 | .382 |
| Boston College ‍‍‍ | 3 | – | 6 | – | 1 | .350 | 10 | – | 8 | – | 1 | .553 |
| Syracuse ‍‍‍ | 2 | – | 7 | – | 1 | .250 | 5 | – | 10 | – | 4 | .368 |
| Miami ‍‍‍ | 2 | – | 7 | – | 1 | .250 | 4 | – | 13 | – | 1 | .250 |
| Pitt ‍‍‍ | 2 | – | 8 | – | 0 | .200 | 6 | – | 12 | – | 0 | .333 |
| NC State ‍‍‍ | 0 | – | 10 | – | 0 | .000 | 2 | – | 15 | – | 2 | .158 |
† – Conference champion ‡ – 2014 ACC Tourney champion: y- Invited to the NCAA Division I Women's Soccer Championship As of November 16, 2014 Rankings from NSCAA

The 2014 Clemson Tigers women's soccer team represented Clemson University during the 2014 NCAA Division I women's soccer season. The Tigers were led by head coach Ed Radwanski, in his fourth season. They played home games at Riggs Field.

== Roster ==
Updated November 13, 2015

Note: Flags indicate national team as defined under FIFA eligibility rules; some limited exceptions apply. Players may hold more than one non-FIFA nationality.

| No. | Pos. | Nation | Player |
|---|---|---|---|
| 1 | GK | (Canada) CAN | Kailen Sheridan |
| 2 | FW | (United States) USA | Miranda Weslake |
| 3 | MF | (United States) USA | Tina Shakes |
| 4 | MF | (United States) USA | Katie Sprouse |
| 5 | DF | (United States) USA | Claire Wagner |
| 6 | MF | (United States) USA | Savannah Coiner |
| 7 | MF | (United States) USA | Shannon Horgan |
| 8 | FW | (United States) USA | Page Reckert |
| 9 | FW | (United States) USA | Salma Anastasio |
| 11 | MF | (United States) USA | Catrina Atanda |
| 12 | MF | (United States) USA | Katelyn Reeve |
| 13 | MF | (United States) USA | Morgan Campbell |

| No. | Pos. | Nation | Player |
|---|---|---|---|
| 14 | MF | (United States) USA | Allie Kington |
| 17 | MF | (United States) USA | Kylie Tawney |
| 18 | MF | (United States) USA | Jeni Erickson |
| 19 | MF | (United States) USA | Jenna Polonsky |
| 20 | DF | (United States) USA | Jenna Weston |
| 21 | MF | (United States) USA | Abby Jones |
| 23 | MF | (United States) USA | Tori Andreski |
| 24 | GK | (United States) USA | Anna Davis |
| 26 | GK | (United States) USA | Hunter Rittgers |
| 27 | DF | (United States) USA | Gabby Byorth |
| 28 | DF | (United States) USA | Emily Byorth |

== Schedule ==
| Date Time, TV | Rank^{#} | Opponent^{#} | Result | Record | Site City, State |
Exhibition
| August 10* | | Georgia | W 3–0 | – (–) | Riggs Field; Clemson, SC |
| August 15* | | Furman | W 2–0 | – (–) | Riggs Field; Clemson, SC |
Regular season
| August 22* | | Auburn | W 2–1 | 1–0–0 (0–0–0) | Riggs Field (1,768); Clemson, SC |
| August 24* | | at Winthrop | W 7–0 | 2–0–0 (0–0–0) | Eagle Field (451); Rock Hill, SC |
| August 29* | | at Elon | W 5–0 | 3–0–0 (0–0–0) | Rudd Field (349); Elon, NC |
| August 31* | | at VCU | W 4–1 | 4–0–0 (0–0–0) | Sports Backers Stadium; Richmond, VA |
| September 5* | | at No. 9 South Carolina; Rivalry | W 1–0 | 5–0–0 (0–0–0) | Stone Stadium (5,855); Columbia, SC |
| September 7* | | Charlotte | T 1–1 ^{2OT} | 5–0–1 (0–0–0) | Riggs Field (375); Clemson, SC |
| September 11* | | Drexel | W 3–0 | 6–0–1 (0–0–0) | Riggs Field (375); Clemson, SC |
| September 14* | No. 17 | Wofford | W 1–0 | 7–0–1 (0–0–0) | Riggs Field (176); Clemson, SC |
| September 19 | No. 17 | at No. 2 Virginia Tech | L 0–2 | 7–1–1 (0–1–0) | Virginia Tech Soccer Stadium (2,173); Blacksburg, VA |
| September 25 | No. 16 | No. 8 North Carolina | L 1–2 | 7–2–1 (0–2–0) | Riggs Field (1,853); Clemson, SC |
| September 28 | No. 16 | Boston College | W 1–0 | 8–2–1 (1–2–0) | Gordon Field (323); Waltham, MA |
| October 4 | No. 21 | at Wake Forest | T 1–1 | 8–2–2 (1–2–1) | Spry Stadium (563); Winston-Salem, NC |
| October 9 | | Duke | W 1–0 | 9–2–2 (2–2–1) | Riggs Field (828); Clemson, SC |
| October 22 | No. 22 | Syracuse | W 1–0 | 10–2–2 (3–2–1) | Riggs Field (674); Clemson, SC |
| October 18 | No. 21 | Miami | W 2–0 | 11–2–2 (4–2–1) | Riggs Field (512); Clemson, SC |
| October 23 | No. 17 | at No. 9 Notre Dame | L 0–1 | 11–3–2 (4–3–1) | Alumni Stadium (872); South Bend, IN |
| October 26 | No. 20 | at Pittsburgh | W 2–1 | 12–3–2 (5–3–1) | Ambrose Urbanic Field (345); Pittsburgh, PA |
| November 1 | No. 16 | NC State; Senior Night | W 2–0 | 13–3–2 (6–3–1) | Riggs Field (489); Clemson, SC |
NCAA Tournament
| November 20* | No. 22 | at No. 18 South Carolina; NCAA First Round | T 0–0 (3–4 PK) ^{2OT} | 13–3–3 | Stone Stadium (1,344); Columbia, SC |
*Non-conference game. ^{#}Rankings from United Soccer Coaches. (#) Tournament seedings in parentheses.
