= 1999 NCAA Division I women's soccer tournament =

1999 NCAA women's soccer tournament
Women's College Cup (semifinals & final)

Tournament details
- Country: United States
- Dates: November–December 1999
- Teams: 48

Final positions
- Champions: North Carolina Tar Heels (15th title, 18th College Cup)
- Runners-up: Notre Dame Fighting Irish (4th title match, 5th College Cup)
- Semifinalists: Penn State Nittany Lions (1st College Cup); Santa Clara Broncos (7th College Cup)

Tournament statistics
- Matches played: 47
- Goals scored: 153 (3.26 per match)
- Attendance: 72,219 (1,537 per match)
- Top goal scorer(s): Kim Patrick, UNC (4G, 3A)

Awards
- Best player: Susan Bush, UNC (Offensive); Lorrie Fair, UNC (Defensive)

The 1999 NCAA Division I women's soccer tournament (also known as the 1999 Women's College Cup) was the 18th annual single-elimination tournament to determine the national champion of NCAA Division I women's collegiate soccer. The semifinals and championship game were played at Spartan Stadium, now known as CEFCU Stadium, in San Jose, California during December 1999. This set a record as the Women's College Cup tournament with the highest total attendance, with over 72,219 people attending all tournament matches.

North Carolina defeated Notre Dame in the final, 2–0, to win their fifteenth national title. The Tar Heels (24–2) were coached by Anson Dorrance.

The most outstanding offensive player was Susan Bush from North Carolina, and the most outstanding defensive player was Lorrie Fair, also from North Carolina. Bush and Fair, along with ten other players, were named to the All-Tournament team.

The tournament's leading scorer, with 4 goals, was Kim Patrick from North Carolina.

== Qualification ==
All NCAA Division I women's soccer programs were eligible to qualify for the tournament. The tournament field remained fixed at 48 teams.

=== Format ===
Just as before, the final two rounds, deemed the Women's College Cup were played at a pre-determined neutral site. All other rounds were played on campus sites at the home field of the higher-seeded team. The top sixteen teams were given a bye to the Second Round while the remaining thirty-two teams played in the preliminary First Round.

=== Teams ===
Santa Clara Regional
Seed	School	Conference	Berth Type	Record
	Boston College	Big East	At-large	14–6–1
	BYU	Mountain West	Automatic	20–3
	California	Pac-10	At-large	13–6–1
	Colgate	Patriot	Automatic	10–7–2
	Connecticut	Big East	At-large	15–7
	Dartmouth	Ivy League	At-large	09–7–1
	Fairfield	MAAC	Automatic	14–4–3
	Harvard	Ivy League	Automatic	14–1–1
	San Diego	West Coast	At-large	15–4
	San Diego State	Mountain West	At-large	15–6
	Santa Clara	West Coast	Automatic	20–0
	UCLA	Pac-10	At-large	14–4–1

Penn State Regional
Seed	School	Conference	Berth Type	Record
	Baylor	Big 12	At-large	14–6–1
	Florida	SEC	Automatic	21–1
	Hartford	America East	Automatic	15–4–2
	James Madison	CAA	At-large	13–6–1
	Long Island	Northeast	Automatic	11–8–2
	Maryland	ACC	At-large	10–9–1
	Penn	Ivy League	At-large	13–3–1
	Penn State	Big Ten	At-large	18–3–1
	Princeton	Ivy League	At-large	12–4–1
	SMU	WAC	Automatic	15–5–1
	USC	Pac-10	At-large	14–5
	Virginia	ACC	At-large	12–8

Notre Dame Regional
Seed	School	Conference	Berth Type	Record
	Cal Poly	Big West	Automatic	12–8
	Dayton	Atlantic 10	Automatic	17–4
	Eastern Michigan	MAC	Automatic	17–3–2
	Evansville	Missouri Valley	Automatic	10–9–2
	Fresno State	WAC	At-large	14–5–2
	Kentucky	SEC	At-large	16–2–2
	Minnesota	Big Ten	At-large	12–8
	Montana	Big Sky	Automatic	12–5–1
	Nebraska	Big 12	Automatic	20–1–1
	Notre Dame	Big East	Automatic	18–3
	Stanford	Pac-10	Automatic	14–4–1
	Texas A&M	Big 12	At-large	15–4–1

North Carolina Regional
Seed	School	Conference	Berth Type	Record
	Clemson	ACC	At-large	13–6–1
	Duke	ACC	At-large	12–9
	Elon	Big South	Automatic	10–7–2
	Furman	Southern	Automatic	20–2
	Marquette	Conference USA	Automatic	15–6–2
	Michigan	Big Ten	Automatic	16–5–1
	Missouri	Big 12	At-large	14–7–1
	North Carolina	ACC	Automatic	19–2
	UCF	Trans America	Automatic	15–5–1
	Wake Forest	ACC	At-large	15–6
	William & Mary	CAA	Automatic	18–3
	Wright State	Midwestern Collegiate	Automatic	11–8–1

== Bracket ==
=== Play-in game ===
November 6
Long Island (NEC, 10–8–2)	1
SW Texas State (SLC, 9–8–3)	0

=== Main bracket ===
First round
BYU	2
California	0
San Diego	2
San Diego State	1
Dartmouth	3
Colgate	0
Boston College	4
Fairfield	1
Dayton	3
Evansville	2
Cal Poly	2
Fresno State	1
Texas A&M	2
Montana	1
Minnesota	2
Eastern Michigan	0
Hartford	2
Princeton	1
James Madison	1
Penn	0
SMU	4
Baylor	0
Maryland	6
Long Island	0
Marquette (4OT)	3
Missouri	2
Michigan	5
Wright State	0
Duke	3
Elon	1
Central Florida	1
Furman	0

Second round
Santa Clara	3
BYU	0
UCLA (OT)	2
San Diego	1
Connecticut	3
Dartmouth	0
Harvard	0
Boston College	1
Notre Dame	5
Dayton	1
Stanford	3
Cal Poly	1
Kentucky (OT)	2
Texas A&M	3
Nebraska	5
Minnesota	0
Florida	0
Hartford	1
Virginia	3
James Madison	1
USC	0
SMU (2OT)	1
Penn State	3
Maryland	2
Clemson	1
Marquette	0
Wake Forest	1
Michigan	0
William & Mary	3
Duke	0
North Carolina	8
Central Florida	0

Third Round
Santa Clara	7
UCLA	0
Connecticut	5
Boston College	0
Notre Dame	1
Stanford	0
Texas A&M	0
Nebraska	1
Hartford (2OT)	3
Virginia	2
SMU	0
Penn State	5
Clemson (3–1 PK)	0
Wake Forest	0
William & Mary	1
North Carolina	5

Quarterfinals
Santa Clara	3
Connecticut	0
Notre Dame (4–3 PK)	1
Nebraska	1
Hartford	0
Penn State	2
Clemson	0
North Carolina	3

Semifinals (Women's College Cup); Spartan Stadium; San Jose, California
Santa Clara	0
Notre Dame	1
Penn State	0
North Carolina	2

Championship (Women's College Cup); Spartan Stadium; San Jose, California
Notre Dame	0
North Carolina	2

== All-tournament team ==
- LaKeysia Beene, Notre Dame
- Susan Bush, North Carolina (most outstanding offensive player)
- Lorrie Fair, North Carolina (most outstanding defensive player)
- Meredith Florance, North Carolina
- Jen Grubb, Notre Dame
- Jena Kluegel, North Carolina
- Kim Patrick, North Carolina
- Anne Remy, North Carolina
- Nikki Serlenga, Santa Clara
- Danielle Slaton, Santa Clara
- Jenny Streiffer, Notre Dame
- Christie Welsh, Penn State

== See also ==
- 1999 NCAA Division I men's soccer tournament
- 1999 NCAA Division II women's soccer tournament
- 1999 NCAA Division III women's soccer tournament
- 1999 NAIA women's soccer tournament
