= Irish women's soccer team =

Irish women's soccer team may refer to:

- Northern Ireland women's national football team
- Notre Dame Fighting Irish women's soccer team, NCAA college team at Notre Dame University, Indiana, United States
- Republic of Ireland women's national football team
