= Sheri Bueter Hauser =

American soccer player (born 1975)

Personal information
- Full name: Sheri Lynn Bueter Hauser
- Birth name: Sheri Lynn Bueter
- Date of birth: July 2, 1975 (age 51)
- Place of birth: Fairfield, Ohio, U.S.
- Height: 5 ft 7 in (1.70 m)
- Positions: Forward; winger

Youth career
- –1994: Fairfield Indians

College career
Years	Team	Apps	(Gls)
1994–1998	Clemson Tigers	88	(26)

International career
1998	United States	1	(0)

Sheri Lynn Bueter Hauser (née Bueter; born July 2, 1975) is an American former soccer player who played as a forward, making one appearance for the United States women's national team.

== Career ==
Bueter Hauser played her youth career with Hammer FC, currently known as Kings Hammer, under coach Clay Revis. In 1993 Bueter Hauser won the US Youth Soccer National Championship in Phoenix Arizona with Hammer FC. Bueter Hauser was a member of the State an Regional ODP team throughout her youth career and a pool player for the ODP National Team.

Bueter Hauser played for the Fairfield Indians in high school.

In college, she played for the Clemson Tigers in 1994 and 1996 to 1998, where she was a letter-winner. She missed the 1995 season due to a knee injury. In total, she scored 26 goals and recorded 40 assists in 88 appearances for the Tigers, making her the school's all-time assist leader. She was included in the ACC First Team selection in 1998, and Second Team in 1994 and 1997. She was also included in the All-ACC Tournament Team in 1996, 1997, and 1998. She was named All- American in 1999 alongside two fellow Tigers.

Bueter Hauser made her only international appearance for the United States on December 16, 1998, in a friendly match against Ukraine, coming on as a substitute for Susan Bush. She played 19 minutes, with the match finishing as a 2–1 win.

In 2001, she was inducted into the Fairfield Highschool Athletic Hall of Fame.

In 2009, she was inducted into the Clemson University Athletic Hall of Fame.

== Personal life ==
Bueter Hauser, who resides in Cornelius, North Carolina, is married to Scott Hauser and has three children. Her son, Nolan Hauser, is currently a kicker for the Clemson Tigers football team, where he kicked a 56-yard field goal to win the 2024 ACC Championship Game. Prior to college, he played football at William A. Hough High School, where he broke the national record for most career field goals by a high school kicker.

== Career statistics ==
=== International ===
United States
Year	Apps	Goals
1998	1	0
Total	1	0
