= Clemson Tigers women's soccer =

American college soccer team

- 2026 Clemson Tigers women's soccer team
- Founded: 1994; 32 years ago
- University: Clemson University
- Head coach: Eddie Radwanski (15th season)
- Conference: ACC
- Location: Clemson, South Carolina, US
- Stadium: Historic Riggs Field (capacity: 6,500)
- Nickname: Tigers
- Colors: Orange and regalia
Home	Away

NCAA tournament College Cup
- 2023

NCAA tournament Quarterfinals
- 1997, 1999, 2000, 2006, 2020, 2023

NCAA tournament Round of 16
- 1997, 1998, 1999, 2000, 2001, 2006, 2016, 2020, 2023

NCAA tournament appearances
- 1994, 1995, 1996, 1997, 1998, 1999, 2000, 2001, 2002, 2003, 2004, 2005, 2006, 2007, 2014, 2015, 2016, 2017, 2018, 2019, 2020, 2021, 2022, 2023, 2025

Conference regular season championships
- 2000, 2016*

The Clemson Tigers women's soccer team represent Clemson University in the Atlantic Coast Conference of NCAA Division I soccer. The team has won 1 Atlantic Coast Conference regular season championship, shared 1 regular season title and advanced to the NCAA Women's soccer tournament 25 times. Their best finish in the NCAA Tournament is reaching the College Cup in 2023.

== Colors and Badge ==
The team uses the school colors of Orange and Regalia.

== History ==
=== 1990s ===
The Clemson women's soccer team was founded in 1994. The program enjoyed early success under its first coach Tracey Leone. The team tied for second place in the Atlantic Coast Conference during this period and made the NCAA tournament in every year. The Tigers also reached the ACC tournament final twice during this period. The team's best finish was a quarterfinals appearance in 1998. In 1999, Tracey Leone was replaced as head coach by Ray Leone.

=== 2000s ===
The team's good fortunes continued in the 2000s finishing no lower than third in the ACC in the first four seasons. Ray Leone left as Head Coach in 2000 and was replaced by Todd Bramble. The team could not quite match the success of the early 2000s, never finishing above fourth in the ACC between 2004 and 2010. The Tigers continued to make the NCAA tournament. They made the tournament every season under Bramble. Their best result was the Quarterfinals in 2008. In 2008, Bramble left as coach and was replaced with Hershey Strosberg. The team took a sharp decline under Strosberg, finishing tenth or below in the ACC in each of his three seasons in charge. The team failed to make the NCAA tournament in those three years, ending a streak of 14 consecutive appearances.

=== 2010s ===
Strosberg was fired in 2010 and replaced with Eddie Radwanski. Radwanski's teams improved in each of their first three seasons but could not finish above tenth in the ACC and failed to make the NCAA tournament. A six win improvement from 2013 to 2014 saw the Tigers finish fifth in the ACC and return to the NCAA tournament. The Tigers have made the NCAA tournament during the next two seasons and recorded double digit wins from 2014 to 2019. The team advanced farther in each NCAA tournament appearance during 2014–16, including a Sweet 16 trip in 2016, their first trip to the Sweet 16 since 2001. The Tigers could not repeat the feat in the last three years of the decade, making the Second Round twice (2017 and 2019), but falling there in each year.

==== Hazing Lawsuit ====
In 2014, a lawsuit was brought against Clemson University, Clemson University administrators, three women's soccer team coaches, and 16 women's soccer team players by Haley Hunt. Hunt was a member of the team from 2011 to 2013. The lawsuit claims that Hunt was subjected to hazing during her time with the team and the hazing caused significant physical harm. As of 2016, Hunt has settled with all but one of the defendants named in the case.

=== 2020s ===
The decade started with a season shortened by the COVID-19 pandemic. The team played a non-conference schedule in the spring of 2021 and played a shortened eight game conference schedule. The team finished fourth in the ACC with a 5–3–0 record, but could not advance past the first round of the ACC Tournament. However, the NCAA Tournament in the spring proved to be a high-water mark for the team. They advanced to the Quarterfinals for the first time since 2006 before losing to Santa Clara. In a more normal regular season in 2021, Clemson went 12–7–1 and 6–3–1 in ACC play. They made the Semifinals of the ACC Tournament but were unable to advance past the First Round of the NCAA Tournament. In 2021, Clemson posted a 8–5–5 overall record and 4–3–3 record in ACC play. They finished in 7th place, which broke a streak of four-straight ACC Tournament qualifications. They received an at-large bid to the NCAA Tournament but lost again in the First Round. The 8 total wins and 4 ACC wins were their lowest totals since 2013. 2023 was one of the better years in program history as the Tigers finished 18–4–4 overall and 7–2–1 in ACC play. Their seven ACC wins tied their highest ever total with 2015 and 2016. They finished as Runners Up in the ACC Tournament for the first time since 2002. They advanced to their first College Cup in program history where they lost to Florida State. The Tigers could not maintain their high level in 2024 as they finished 6–8–3 overall and 2–7–1 in ACC play. Their six overall wins were the lowest since 2012 and tied for the lowest in the time since Radwanski has been head coach. Their two conference wins were also the lowest since 2012. By not earning an invite to the NCAA tournament, they broke a streak of qualifying for ten consecutive tournaments. The 2025 season was a slight return to form as the Tigers finished 8–6–5 overall and 4–4–2 in ACC play. They returend to the NCAA Tournament, where they reached the Second Round before falling to the top seed in their region. The Tigers played ten of their nineteen matches during that season against ranked teams.

== Personnel ==
=== Current roster ===
As of January 26, 2026

Note: Flags indicate national team as defined under FIFA eligibility rules; some limited exceptions apply. Players may hold more than one non-FIFA nationality.

No.	Pos.	Nation	Player
1	GK	USA	Nona Reason
2	MF	USA	Kendall Bodak
3	DF	USA	Maddie Costello
4	MF	USA	Neely Kerr
5	MF	ENG	Emily Brough
7	MF	USA	Dani Davis
8	FW	USA	Jenna Tobia
9	DF	USA	Mackenzie Duff
10	FW	USA	Renee Lyles
11	FW	USA	Tatum Short
12	FW	USA	Natalie Brooks
14	DF	USA	Baleigh Bruster
15	FW	USA	Ella Johnson
16	FW	USA	Jolie Jenkins

No.	Pos.	Nation	Player
17	MF	USA	Anna Castenfelt
18	FW	USA	Maria Manousos
19	FW	USA	JuJu Harris
20	MF	USA	Taylor Leib
21	MF	USA	Carla Small
22	MF	USA	Gabby Gambino
24	DF	USA	Reese Klein
25	DF	USA	Elle Bissinger
26	GK	USA	Addy Holgorsen
27	MF	USA	Erin Sherden
28	MF	USA	Alessandra Washington
29	FW	USA	Jordan Thompson
30	MF	USA	Christian Brathwaite
34	GK	USA	Maddie Parrott

=== Team management ===
Position	Staff
Athletic director	(United States) Graham Neff
Head coach	(United States) Eddie Radwanski
Associate head coach	(United States) Jeff Robbins
Assistant coach	(United States) Siri Mullinix
Assistant coach	(United States) Maryanne Kilgore
Director of Operations	(United States) Ewan Seabrook

== Awards ==
=== All-Americans ===
The Tigers have had twelve players selected as all-Americans in their history. However, they have never had a first team all-American player.

Name	Year
Carmie Landeen (3rd team)	1995
Sara Burkett (2nd team)	1997
Nancy Augustyniak (2nd team)	2000
Katie Carson (3rd team)	2001
Deliah Arrington (2nd team)	2002
Ashley Phillips (3rd team)	2006
Catrina Atanda (3rd team)	2016
Sam Staab (3rd team)	2018
Megan Bornkamp (3rd team)	2020/21
Megan Bornkamp (3rd team)	2021
Halle Mackiewicz (2nd team)	2023
Makenna Morris (2nd team)	2023

=== ACC Awards ===
ACC Player of the Year

- Deliah Arrington – 2002
- Sam Staab – 2018

ACC Coach of the Year

- Ray Leone – 2000
- Eddie Radwanski – 2016

ACC Rookie of the Year

- Carmie Landeen – 1994
- Lindsay Browne – 2000

ACC Goalkeeper of the Year

- Halle Mackiewicz – 2023

All-ACC First Team

- Sara Burkett – 1995, 1996, 1997, 1998
- Meredith McCullen – 1995
- Sheri Bueter – 1998
- Nancy Augustyniak – 1999, 2000
- Beth Keller – 1999
- Deliah Arrington – 2000, 2001, 2002
- Lindsay Browne – 2000, 2001
- Katie Carson – 2000
- Heather Beem – 2002
- Allison Graham – 2003, 2004
- Paige Ledford – 2004
- Ashley Phillips – 2007
- Kailen Sheridan – 2015, 2016
- Catrina Atanda – 2016
- Sam Staab – 2018
- Megan Bornkamp – 2021
- Hal Hershfelt – 2023
- Halle Mackiewicz – 2023
- Makenna Morris – 2023

All-ACC Second Team

- Carmie Landeen – 1994, 2995
- Sheri Bueter – 1994, 1997
- Beth Keller – 1996
- Lindsay Massengale – 1997
- Meredith McCullen – 1997
- Julie Augustyniak – 1999
- Paige Ledford – 2001, 2002
- Courtney Foster – 2003, 2004, 2005
- Allison Mitchell – 2003
- Lauren Whitt – 2003
- Allison Graham – 2005
- Ashley Phillips – 2005, 2006
- Julie Bolt – 2006, 2007
- Elizabeth Jobe – 2007
- Catrina Atanda – 2015
- Sam Staab – 2016, 2017
- Mariana Speckmaier – 2018, 2020
- Makenna Morris – 2020
- Hal Hershfelt – 2021, 2022
- Megan Bornkamp – 2022

All-ACC Third Team

- Vanessa Laxgang – 2013
- Kailen Sheridan – 2013
- Abby Jones – 2015
- Claire Wagner – 2015, 2016
- Sandy MacIver – 2018
- Miranda Westlake – 2018
- Hal Hershfelt – 2020
- Megan Bornkamp – 2020, 2023
- Courtney Jones – 2020
- Makenna Morris – 2021
- Renee Guion – 2021
- Hensley Hancuff – 2021
- Caroline Conti – 2022, 2023
- Maliah Morris – 2022
- Harper White – 2023
- JuJu Harris – 2025

ACC All-Freshman Team

- Lindsay Browne – 2000
- Jenny Anderson – 2001
- Paige Ledford – 2001
- Allison Graham – 2002
- Courtney Foster – 2003
- Elizabeth Jobe – 2004
- Lauren Johnston – 2004
- Katie Vogel – 2006
- Kailen Sheridan – 2013
- Sam Staab – 2015
- Mariana Speckmaier – 2017
- Hal Hershfelt – 2019
- Maliah Morris – 2019
- Makenna Morris – 2020
- Megan Bornkamp – 2020
- Renee Lyles – 2021
- Dani Davis – 2023
- Tatum Short – 2023
- Jenna Tobia – 2023
- JuJu Harris – 2025

== Seasons ==
Season	Head coach	Season result							Tournament results		Top points		Top scorer	
Season	Head coach	Overall			Conference				Conference	NCAA	Top points		Top scorer	
Season	Head coach	Wins	Losses	Ties	Wins	Losses	Ties	Finish	Conference	NCAA	Top points		Top scorer	
1994	Tracey Leone	15	4	1	3	3	0	4th	Quarterfinalists	Second round	Carmie Landeen	57	Carmie Landeen	24
1995	Tracey Leone	14	7	0	2	5	0	6th	Quarterfinalists	Second round	Carmie Landeen	42	Carmie Landeen	19
1996	Tracey Leone	15	7	1	3	3	1	T-2nd	Finalists	Second round	Jennifer Crawford	32	Jennifer Crawford	13
1997	Tracey Leone	15	7	0	4	3	0	T-3rd	Semifinalists	Quarterfinals	Jennifer Crawford	36	Jennifer Crawford	17
1998	Tracey Leone	16	7	0	5	2	0	T-2nd	Finalists	Sweet 16	Sara Burkett	42	Sara Burkett	16
1999	Ray Leone	14	7	2	4	3	0	T-3rd	Semifinalists	Quarterfinals	Deliah Arrington	25	Deliah Arrington	9
2000	Ray Leone	19	3	1	5	1	1	Champions	Semifinalists	Quarterfinals	Lindsay Browne	38	Lindsay Browne	13
2001	Todd Bramble	15	5	1	4	3	0	T-3rd	Quarterfinalists	Sweet 16	Lindsay Browne	26	Deliah Arrington	11
2002	Todd Bramble	14	8	0	4	3	0	T-2nd	Finalists	First round	Deliah Arrington	43	Deliah Arrington	18
2003	Todd Bramble	11	7	2	4	3	0	T-3rd	Quarterfinalists	First round	Courtney Foster	31	Courtney Foster	13
2004	Todd Bramble	10	8	2	4	4	1	T-5th	Semifinalists	First round	Courtney Foster/Lindsay Browne	15	Courtney Foster	7
2005	Todd Bramble	9	9	2	4	5	1	T-6th	Quarterfinalists	First round	Allison Graham	23	Allison Graham	7
2006	Todd Bramble	11	8	5	5	3	2	T-4th	Seminfinalists	Quarterfinals	Molly Franklin	16	Molly Franklin	6
2007	Todd Bramble	10	6	5	2	3	5	8th	Quarterfinalists	Second round	Courtney Foster	16	Courtney Foster	6
2008	Hershey Strosberg	5	11	1	1	8	1	10th	—	—	Julie Bolt	19	Julie Bolt	9
2009	Hershey Strosberg	3	15	0	0	10	0	11th	—	—	Maddy Elder	21	Maddy Elder	10
2010	Hershey Strosberg	6	13	0	0	10	0	11th	—	—	Maddy Elder	15	Maddy Elder	5
2011	Eddie Radwanski	6	12	2	0	10	0	11th	—	—	Maddy Elder	22	Maddy Elder	8
2012	Eddie Radwanski	6	10	2	1	9	0	10th	—	—	Maddy Elder	8	Liska Dobberstein/Jenna Polonsky	3
2013	Eddie Radwanski	7	8	4	4	7	2	10th	—	—	Vanessa Laxgang	10	Vanessa Laxgang	5
2014	Eddie Radwanski	13	3	3	6	3	1	5th	—	First round	Catrina Atanda	20	Catrina Atanda	9
2015	Eddie Radwanski	14	2	4	7	3	0	4th	Semifinalists	Second round	Catrina Atanda	13	Catrina Atanda	5
2016	Eddie Radwanski	14	5	4	7	1	2	T-1st	Semifinalists	Sweet 16	Catrina Atanda	18	Catrina Atanda	12
2017	Eddie Radwanski	10	5	4	3	4	3	9th	—	Second round	Jenna Polonsky	19	Mariana Speckmaier/Jenna Polonsky	7
2018	Eddie Radwanski	12	9	0	6	4	0	6th	Semifinalists	First round	Mariana Speckmaier	22	Mariana Speckmaier	10
2019	Eddie Radwanski	11	7	2	5	5	0	7th	First round	Second round	Renee Guion	14	Mariana Speckmaier	6
2020	Eddie Radwanski	12	5	2	5	3	0	4th	First round	Quarterfinals	Megan Bornkamp	17	Megan Bornkamp	8
2021	Eddie Radwanski	12	7	1	6	3	1	5th	Semifinalists	First round	Hal Hershfelt/Maliah Morris	17	Megan Bornkamp	10
2022	Eddie Radwanski	8	5	5	4	3	3	7th	—	First round	Caroline Conti	13	Caroline Conti/Renee Lyles	4
2023	Eddie Radwanski	18	4	4	7	2	1	3rd	Finalists	College Cup	Makenna Morris	26	Makenna Morris	10
2024	Eddie Radwanski	6	8	3	2	7	1	14th	—	—	Kendall Bodak	9	Chrisitan Brathwaite/ Kendall Bodak/Mackenzie Duff	3
2025	Eddie Radwanski	8	6	5	4	4	2	T-10th	—	Second round	JuJu Harris	7	JuJu Harris	8
Totals: 32 Seasons	5 Head Coaches	359	228	68	121	133	28	2 Regular Season Titles	0 Conference Tournament Titles	25 NCAA Appearances	Deliah Arrington	127	Deliah Arrington	50

== Records ==
Career Scoring
Rk	Player	Goals	Assists	Points	Seasons
1	Deliah Arrington	50	27	127	1999–2002
2	Sara Burkett	39	36	114	1995–1998
3	Lindsay Browne	34	34	102	2000–2004
4	Carmie Landeen	43	13	99	1994–1995
5	Beth Keller	35	23	93	1996–1999
6	Sheri Bueter Hauser	26	40	92	1994–1998
7	Jennifer Crawford	38	15	91	1996–1999
8	Heather Beem	28	23	79	1999–2002
9	Courtney Foster	31	14	76	2003–2007
10	Caroline Conti	27	20	74	2019–2024

Career Saves
Rk	Player	Saves	Seasons
1	Ashley Phillips	326	2004–2007
2	Katie Carson	305	1998–2001
3	Kailen Sheridan	229	2013–2016
4	Meredith McCullen	228	1994–1997
5	Paula Pritzen	193	2007–2009

Games Played
Rk	Player	Games	Seasons
1	Renee Guion	101	2018–2021
2	Caroline Conti	100	2019–2023
3	Hal Hershfelt	99	2019–2023
4	Alison Burpee	90	1996–1999
5	Julie Augustyniak	89	1997–2000
5	Katie Carson	89	1998–2001

== Notable alumni ==
=== Current Professional Players ===
As of January 26, 2026

- (United States) Beth Goetz (1994–1995) Currently Athletic Director at the University of Iowa
- (United States) Ashley Phillips – (2004–2007) Currently head coach at Northeastern
- Kailen Sheridan – (2013–2016) Currently with North Carolina Courage and Canada international
- (United States) Sam Staab – (2015–2018) Currently with Chicago Stars FC
- (Scotland) Sandy MacIver – (2016–2019) Currently with Washington Spirit
- Mariana Speckmaier – (2017–2020) Currently with Durham and Venezuela international
- (United States) Caroline Conti – (2019–2023) Currently with Bay FC
- Hal Hershfelt – (2019–2023) Currently with Washington Spirit and United States international
- (United States) Halle Mackiewicz – (2020–2023) Currently with Chicago Stars FC
- (United States) Maliah Morris – (2019–2022) Currently with Racing Power FC
- (United States) Makenna Morris – (2020–2023) Currently with Racing Louisville FC
