= Deliah Arrington =

American soccer player

Personal information
- Date of birth: March 5, 1981 (age 45)
- Place of birth: Pawleys Island, South Carolina
- Height: 5 ft 5 in (1.65 m)
- Position: Forward

College career
Years	Team	Apps	(Gls)
1999–2002	Clemson Tigers	85	(50)

Senior career*
Years	Team	Apps	(Gls)
2003	Philadelphia Charge	5	(1)
- * Club domestic league appearances and goals

Deliah Arrington is a retired American soccer player who played for the Philadelphia Charge.

== Early life ==
Arrington attended West Florence High School before transferring to Waccamaw High School.

Arrington attended Clemson University and played for the school's soccer team, being named Atlantic Coast Conference Player of the Year and an All-American in 2002. She was inducted into the Clemson Hall of Fame in 2012.

== Club career ==
Arrington's success in college soccer lead her to be spotted by professional soccer teams in the Women's United Soccer Association. She was the sixth overall pick in the 2003 WUSA Draft by the Philadelphia Charge.

== Personal life ==
Arrington's father, Vandell, played college football for Clemson.

After retiring from professional soccer, Arrington become Site Coordinator, Potomac Science Center for the George Mason University.
