= Chayse Ying =

Filipino footballer (born 2005)

- Ying with Notre Dame in 2026

Personal information
- Full name: Chayse Camryn Dumana Ying
- Date of birth: September 1, 2005 (age 21)
- Place of birth: Orange County, California, U.S.
- Height: 5 ft 4 in (1.63 m)
- Positions: Midfielder; forward

Team information
- Current team: Notre Dame Fighting Irish
- Number: 21

Youth career
- Tudela FC LA
- Flintridge Prep Wolves

College career
Years	Team	Apps	(Gls)
2023–	Notre Dame Fighting Irish	57	(1)

International career^{‡}
2023	Philippines U20	3	(0)
2025–	Philippines	2	(0)
- ‡ National team caps and goals as of June 29, 2025

Chayse Camryn Dumana Ying (born September 1, 2005) is a footballer who plays as a midfielder or forward for the Notre Dame Fighting Irish. Born in the United States, she represents the Philippines at international level.

== Early life ==
Ying grew up in Los Angeles, California, and attended Flintridge Preparatory School, where she played high school soccer. She helped the team win league titles and was named First Team All-CIF. She also played club soccer for Tudela FC LA and was part of the United States U-17 national team pool.

== College career ==
Ying began her collegiate career at the University of Notre Dame in 2023. As a freshman, she made 11 appearances, scoring one goal and providing one assist. In her sophomore season, she featured in 21 matches and was named to the ACC All-Academic Team in both years.

== International career ==
In 2023, Ying represented the Philippines U-20 team in the 2024 AFC U-20 Women's Asian Cup qualification held in Vientiane, Laos, appearing in all three matches during the qualifying round.

She received her first senior call-up to the Philippines women's national team on March 31, 2024, for a pair of friendlies against South Korea. Ying made her senior international debut on June 3, 2025, in a friendly match against Chinese Taipei.
