= Ena Taslidža =

German–Bosnian footballer

Personal information
- Date of birth: 14 August 2001 (age 25)
- Place of birth: Darmstadt, Germany
- Height: 1.70 m (5 ft 7 in)
- Position: Forward

Team information
- Current team: Thonon Evian

College career
Years	Team	Apps	(Gls)
2020–2021	Miami Hurricanes	3	(0)

Senior career*
Years	Team	Apps	(Gls)
2019	FFC Frankfurt II	11	(0)
2021	1. FFC 08 Niederkirchen	9	(0)
2023–2025	Turbine Potsdam	22	(3)

International career^{‡}
2018–2021	Bosnia and Herzegovina U19	3	(0)
2018–	Bosnia and Herzegovina	7	(0)
- * Club domestic league appearances and goals as of 18 August 2024 (UTC) ‡ National team caps and goals as of 19 September 2023 (UTC)

Ena Taslidža (born 14 August 2001) is a footballer who plays as a forward. Born in Germany, she represents Bosnia and Herzegovina at international level.

== Career ==
Taslidža has been capped for the Bosnia and Herzegovina national team, appearing for the team during the 2019 FIFA Women's World Cup qualifying cycle.
