= Julie Augustyniak =

American soccer player (born 1979)

Personal information
- Full name: Julie Ann Augustyniak
- Date of birth: February 1, 1979 (age 47)
- Place of birth: Norfolk, Virginia, U.S.
- Height: 5 ft 5 in (1.65 m)
- Position: Defender

College career
Years	Team	Apps	(Gls)
1997–2000	Clemson Tigers		

Senior career*
Years	Team	Apps	(Gls)
1997–2000	Atlanta Classics		
2001–2003	Atlanta Beat	43	(0)
2004–2005	1. FFC Turbine Potsdam	14	
2005	F.C. Indiana		
2006	Atlanta Silverbacks Women		
- * Club domestic league appearances and goals

Julie Ann Augustyniak (born February 1, 1979) is an American former professional soccer player who featured primarily as a defender.

== Early life and education ==
Augustyniak was born in Norfolk, Virginia and raised in Peachtree City, Georgia. She went to McIntosh High School and then Clemson University. While enrolled, she played for the Clemson Tigers women's soccer team. She was inducted into the McIntosh High School Hall of Fame in 2015.

== Career ==
She played for the Atlanta Classics of the W-League from 1997 to 2000, before joining the Beat at the team's inception. She was selected in the eighth round of the 2000 WUSA Draft by the Atlanta Beat as the 64th overall selection. Her twin sister Nancy Augustyniak also played for Atlanta Beat. They were involved in the first instance of two sets of twins that faced each other in a professional game when the Beat played against the Washington Freedom in 2002.

She joined the F.C. Indiana for the 2005 season. In the summer of 2006, she played for the Atlanta Silverbacks Women.

== Personal life ==
She married Christopher Tuff. She is currently teaching at Holy Innocents' and coaching at Top Hat.

== Career statistics ==
=== Club ===
These statistics are incomplete and currently represent a portion of Augustyniak's career.

Appearances and goals by club, season and competition
Club	Season	League			Other		Total	
Club	Season	Division	Apps	Goals	Apps	Goals	Apps	Goals
Atlanta Beat	2001	WUSA	10	0	2	0	12	0
Atlanta Beat	2002	WUSA	20	0	1	0	21	0
Atlanta Beat	2003	WUSA	13	0	1	0	14	0
Atlanta Beat	Atlanta Beat total		43	0	4	0	47	0
1. FFC Turbine Potsdam	2004–05	Frauen-Bundesliga	14				14	
1. FFC Turbine Potsdam	1. FFC Turbine Potsdam total		14				14	
Career total			57	0	4	0	61	0
