= Nancy Augustyniak Goffi =

American soccer player (born 1979)

Personal information
- Full name: Nancy Jean Augustyniak Goffi
- Birth name: Nancy Jean Augustyniak
- Date of birth: February 1, 1979 (age 47)
- Place of birth: Norfolk, Virginia, U.S.
- Height: 5 ft 5 in (1.65 m)
- Position: Defender

College career
Years	Team	Apps	(Gls)
1997–2000	Clemson Tigers		

Senior career*
Years	Team	Apps	(Gls)
1997–2000	Atlanta Classics		
2001–2003	Atlanta Beat	58	(0)
2004	1. FFC Turbine Potsdam	13	(0)
2004	Chicago Cobras	2	(0)
2004	Stattena IF		
2005	VfL Wolfsburg		
2005	F.C. Indiana		
2007	Fort Collins Force	3	(0)
2009	Boston Breakers	11	(0)
- * Club domestic league appearances and goals

Nancy Jean Augustyniak Goffi (née Augustyniak; born February 1, 1979) is an American former professional soccer player who featured primarily as a defender.

== Early life and education ==
Augustyniak Goffi was born in Norfolk, Virginia and raised in Peachtree City, Georgia. She went to McIntosh High School and then Clemson University. While enrolled, she played for the Clemson Tigers women's soccer team. She was inducted into the McIntosh High School Hall of Fame in 2015.

== Career ==
Augustyniak Goffi played for the Atlanta Classics of the W-League from 1998 to 2000, before joining the Atlanta Beat at the team's inception. The Beat selected her in the 5th round of the 2000 WUSA Draft which was the 33rd overall pick. Her twin sister Julie Augustyniak also played for the Beat and they were involved in the first instance of two sets of twins that faced each other in a professional game when the Beat played against the Washington Freedom in 2002. Augustyniak Goffi would later describe playing in the WUSA as "the best three years of [her] life".

Augustyniak Goffi moved to 1. FFC Turbine Potsdam following the demise of the WUSA and made her Fußball-Bundesliga debut for the club on February 22, 2004, as a 70th-minute substitute against Hamburger SV. She went on to appear for the club 13 times with 10 starts but no goals. With the assistance of her twin sister, Julie Augustyniak, Turbine Potsdam went on to win both the 2003–2004 Fußball-Bundesliga championship and the 2003–04 Frauen DFB Pokal.

== Career statistics ==
=== Club ===
These statistics are incomplete and represent a portion of Augustyniak's career.

Appearances and goals by club, season and competition
Club	Season	League			Other		Total	
Club	Season	Division	Apps	Goals	Apps	Goals	Apps	Goals
Atlanta Beat	2001	WUSA	19	0	2	0	21	0
Atlanta Beat	2002	WUSA	19	0	1	0	20	0
Atlanta Beat	2003	WUSA	20	0	2	0	22	0
Atlanta Beat	Atlanta Beat total		58	0	5	0	63	0
1. FFC Turbine Potsdam	2004–05	Frauen-Bundesliga	13	0			13	0
1. FFC Turbine Potsdam	1. FFC Turbine Potsdam total		13	0			13	0
Chicago Cobras	2004	USL W-League	2	0			2	0
Chicago Cobras	Chicago Cobras total		2	0			2	0
Career total			73	0	5	0	78	0
