= Atlanta Beat =

Atlanta Beat may refer to two professional soccer teams based in Atlanta:

- Atlanta Beat (WUSA) (2001–2003), the original team that played in the Women's United Soccer Association
- Atlanta Beat (WPS) (2009–2011), the team that played in Women's Professional Soccer
