= Hershey Strosberg =

American soccer coach

Personal information
- Full name: Hershey Strosberg
- Place of birth: United States

Youth career
- 1995–1996: SUNY Cortland

Senior career*
| Years | Team | Apps | (Gls) |
| 1996–1998 | Albany Alleycats | | |

Managerial career
- 1998–2000: Cortland Red Dragons (assistant)
- 2001–2007: Virginia Cavaliers (assistant)
- 2008–2010: Clemson Tigers
- * Club domestic league appearances and goals

Hershey Strosberg is a retired American soccer coach. He was the head coach of the Clemson Tigers women's soccer team and an assistant coach for the Virginia Cavaliers women's soccer team.

== Education ==
Strosberg received a B.S. in physical education from SUNY Cortland in 1997. He also earned a master's degree in physical education from SUNY Cortland in 1999.

== Coaching career ==
Strosberg worked in the recruiting operations at both SUNY Cortland and the University of Virginia. Strosberg was hired to take over for Todd Bramble at Clemson. Strosberg was fired after the 2010 season, where he led the Tigers to a 6–13 overall record, including a 0–10 record in the ACC. Strosberg's career record with the Tigers was 14-39-1 in three seasons.

== Personal life ==
Strosberg is married to Jessia Strosberg. The couple was married in 2007.
