= 2016 ACC women's soccer tournament =

- Classification: Division I
- Teams: 8
- Matches: 7
- Site: MUSC Health Stadium; Charleston, South Carolina (Semifinals and Final)
- Champions: Florida State (5th title)
- Winning coach: Mark Krikorian (5th title)
- MVP: Natalia Kuikka (Florida State)
- Broadcast: ESPNU (Final only)

2016 ACC women's soccer standings
| | Conf. | | | | | | Overall |
| Team | W | | L | | T | PCT | W | | L | | T | PCT |
|---|---|---|---|---|---|---|---|---|---|---|---|---|
| #21 Notre Dame ‍†‍‍^{y} | 7 | – | 1 | – | 2 | .800 | 13 | – | 3 | – | 5 | .738 |
| No. 12 Clemson ‍†‍‍^{y} | 7 | – | 1 | – | 2 | .800 | 14 | – | 5 | – | 4 | .696 |
| No. 7 Duke ‍‍‍^{y} | 7 | – | 2 | – | 1 | .750 | 15 | – | 4 | – | 3 | .750 |
| #4 North Carolina ‍‍‍^{y} | 6 | – | 2 | – | 2 | .700 | 16 | – | 3 | – | 4 | .783 |
| No. 11 Virginia ‍‍‍^{y} | 6 | – | 2 | – | 2 | .700 | 15 | – | 5 | – | 2 | .727 |
| No. 14 Florida State ‍‍‡‍^{y} | 6 | – | 2 | – | 2 | .700 | 14 | – | 4 | – | 4 | .727 |
| Miami ‍‍‍ | 5 | – | 5 | – | 0 | .500 | 10 | – | 8 | – | 1 | .553 |
| No. 24 NC State ‍‍‍^{y} | 4 | – | 5 | – | 1 | .450 | 11 | – | 9 | – | 2 | .545 |
| Virginia Tech ‍‍‍ | 3 | – | 4 | – | 3 | .450 | 11 | – | 5 | – | 3 | .658 |
| Louisville ‍‍‍ | 2 | – | 5 | – | 3 | .350 | 7 | – | 7 | – | 4 | .500 |
| Boston College ‍‍‍ | 3 | – | 7 | – | 0 | .300 | 11 | – | 8 | – | 1 | .575 |
| Wake Forest ‍‍‍ | 2 | – | 8 | – | 0 | .200 | 10 | – | 8 | – | 0 | .556 |
| Syracuse ‍‍‍ | 1 | – | 7 | – | 2 | .200 | 8 | – | 8 | – | 3 | .500 |
| Pittsburgh ‍‍‍ | 1 | – | 9 | – | 0 | .100 | 2 | – | 15 | – | 1 | .139 |
† – Conference champion ‡ – 2016 ACC Tournament champion y – Invited to the NCAA tournament As of 2016-7-2; Rankings from NSCAA

== Qualification ==
The top eight teams in the Atlantic Coast Conference earned a berth into the ACC Tournament. The quarterfinal round is held at campus sites, with the semifinals and final held at MUSC Health Stadium in Charleston, SC.

== Bracket ==
Quarterfinals; Sunday, October 30
1 | Notre Dame | 1
8 | NC State | 0
4 | North Carolina | 3
5 | Virginia | 0
2 | Clemson | 1 (5)
7 | Miami | 1 (4)
3 | Duke | 1 (2)
6 | Florida State | 1 (3)

Semifinals; Friday, November 4
1 | Notre Dame | 1
4 | North Carolina | 2
2 | Clemson | 0
6 | Florida State | 1

Final; Sunday, November 6
4 | North Carolina | 0 (3)
6 | Florida State | 0 (4)

== Schedule ==
=== Quarter-finals ===
| October 30, 2016 | #1 Notre Dame | 1–0 | #8 NC State | Notre Dame, Indiana |
| 1:00 p.m. EST | Kaitlin Klawunder 88' | Report | | Stadium: Alumni Stadium; Referee: Mathew Richardson |

| October 30, 2016 | #2 Clemson | 1–1 (a.e.t.) (5–4 p) | #7 Miami | Clemson, South Carolina |
| 1:00 p.m. EST | Catrina Atanda 10' | Report | Gianna Dal Pozzo 26' | Stadium: Riggs Field; Referee: David Breckner |
| | Penalties |
| | Catrina Atanda (penalty scored); Kailen Sheridan (penalty scored); Jenna Weston (penalty scored); Katie Sprouse (penalty scored); Shannon Horgan (penalty scored) | | (penalty scored) Gianna Dal Pozzo; (penalty scored) Shannon McCarthy; (penalty missed) Kristina Fisher; (penalty scored) Gracie Lachowecki; (penalty scored) Grace Rapp |

| October 30, 2016 | #3 Duke | 1–1 (a.e.t.) (2–3 p) | #6 Florida State | Durham, North Carolina |
| 1:00 p.m. EST | Ashton Miller 32' | Report | Deyna Castellanos 48' | Stadium: Koskinen Stadium; Referee: Peter Dhima |
| | Penalties |
| | Chelsea Burns (penalty missed); Christina Gibbons (penalty missed); Imani Dorsey (penalty missed); Olivia Erlbeck (penalty scored); Malinda Allen (penalty scored) | | (penalty scored) Kirsten Crowley; (penalty missed) Deyna Castellanos; (penalty scored) Natalia Kuikka; (penalty missed) Malia Berkely; (penalty scored) Megan Connolly |

| October 30, 2016 | #4 North Carolina | 3–0 | #5 Virginia | Chapel Hill, North Carolina |
| 1:00 p.m. EST | Madison Schultz 39'; Sarah Ashley Firstenberg 45'; Julia Ashley 65' | Report | | Stadium: Fetzer Field; Referee: Alex Sorondo |

=== Semi-finals ===
| November 4, 2016 | #1 Notre Dame | 1–2 | #4 North Carolina | Charleston, South Carolina |
| 5:30 p.m. EST | Kaleigh Olmsted 72' | Report | Maya Worth 22'; Annie Kingman 86' | Stadium: MUSC Health Stadium; Referee: Charles Murphy |

| November 4, 2016 | #2 Clemson | 0–1 | #6 Florida State | Charleston, South Carolina |
| 8:00 p.m. EST | | Report | Megan Connolly 4' | Stadium: MUSC Health Stadium; Referee: David Erbacher |

=== Final ===
| November 6, 2016 | #4 North Carolina | 0–0 (a.e.t.) (3–4 p) | #6 Florida State | Charleston, South Carolina |
| 12:00 p.m. EST | | Report | | Stadium: MUSC Health Stadium; Referee: John Brady |
| | Penalties |
| | Annie Kingman (penalty scored); Megan Buckingham (penalty scored); Abby Elinsky (penalty missed); Hanna Gardner (penalty scored); Bridgette Andrzejewski (penalty missed) | | (penalty scored) Kirsten Crowley; (penalty scored) Natalia Kuikka; (penalty scored) Megan Connolly; (penalty scored) Haylie Grant |

== All-Tournament team ==
| Player | Team |
|---|---|
| Catrina Atanda | Clemson |
| Kaleigh Olmstead | Notre Dame |
| Lindsey Harris | North Carolina |
| Annie Kingman | North Carolina |
| Bridgette Andrzejewski | North Carolina |
| Julia Ashley | North Carolina |
| Kirsten Crowley | Florida State |
| Megan Connolly | Florida State |
| Cassie Miller | Florida State |
| Natalia Kuikka | Florida State |

== See also ==
- Atlantic Coast Conference
- 2016 Atlantic Coast Conference women's soccer season
- 2016 NCAA Division I women's soccer season
- 2016 NCAA Division I Women's Soccer Tournament
