= Eddie Radwanski =

American soccer player and coach (born 1963)

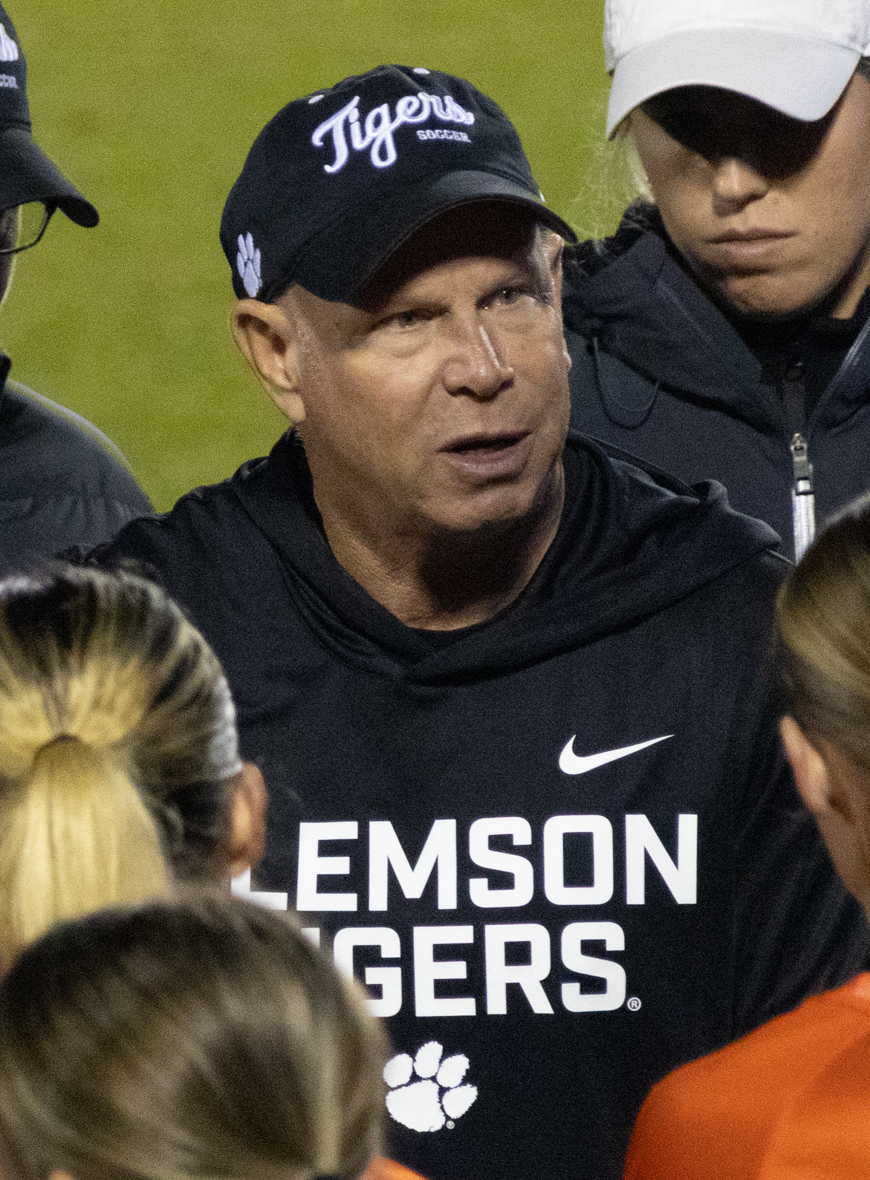
- Radwanski with Clemson in 2025

Personal information
- Full name: Edward Radwanski
- Date of birth: May 5, 1963 (age 63)
- Place of birth: Neptune Township, New Jersey, U.S.
- Height: 5 ft 7 in (1.70 m)
- Position: Midfielder

College career
Years	Team	Apps	(Gls)
1981–1984	UNC Greensboro Spartans		

Senior career*
Years	Team	Apps	(Gls)
1985–1988	Dallas Sidekicks (indoor)	157	(39)
1990–1991	Dallas Rockets		
1990–1992	Tacoma Stars (indoor)	50	(19)
1993–1997	Greensboro Dynamo	117	(18)
1995	Washington Warthogs (indoor)	10	(3)

International career
1985	United States	5	(0)
1992	United States futsal		

Managerial career
- 1998: UNC Greensboro Spartans (women's asst.)
- 1999: Piedmont Spark
- 2001–2010: UNC Greensboro Spartans (women's)
- 2011–: Clemson Tigers (women's)
- * Club domestic league appearances and goals

Edward Radwanski (born May 5, 1963, in Neptune Township, New Jersey) is an American former soccer midfielder who is the head coach of the Clemson Tigers women's soccer team. He spent five seasons in the Major Indoor Soccer League, one in the Continental Indoor Soccer League and seven in the USISL and its predecessor, the SISL. He also earned five caps with the U.S. national team in 1985.

== Player ==
=== Youth and college ===
Radwanski grew up in New Jersey and graduated from Neptune High School in 1981. In 1999, he was named by The Star-Ledger as one of the top ten New Jersey high school soccer players of the 1980s. In addition to playing with his school teams, he was a member of the Wall Atoms youth club. After graduating from high school, Radwanski attended the University of North Carolina at Greensboro (UNCG) where he played on the school's NCAA Division III soccer team from 1981 to 1984. In both 1982 and 1983, UNCG won the Division III soccer championship. In 1983 and 1984, Radwanski was named a first team Division III All American and finished his career at UNCG with thirty-eight goals and fifty-six assists. While he finished his collegiate playing career in 1984, he did not earn his UNCG bachelor's degree in business and economics until 1997, while playing for the Greensboro Dynamo

=== Professional ===
In 1985, the expansion Dallas Sidekicks of Major Indoor Soccer League (MISL) made Radwanski the first player drafted by the team when they selected him with the number one pick in the 1985 MISL draft. He spent three seasons with the Sidekicks, winning the 1986–1987 MISL title with them. Dallas released Radwanski on June 15, 1988. In October 1988, Kenny Cooper Sr., head coach of the Baltimore Blast, signed Radwanski to play with the Blast. However, Radwanski retired a few days later after being told during a team physical that he risked permanent back damage if he continued playing. Radwanski returned to soccer in 1990 when he joined the Dallas Rockets of the Southwest Independent Soccer League. In 1991, he was a member of the team when it won the league championship. In the fall of 1990, he signed with the Tacoma Stars of MISL. He spent two season with the Stars until they folded at the end of the 1991–1992 season. In 1993, he moved east to the Greensboro Dynamo of the USISL. He remained with the Dynamo until 1997. In 1996, the team renamed itself the Carolina Dynamo. In both 1993 and 1994, the Dynamo won the USISL outdoor championship. In 1993, he was both the League and Championship MVPs. Radwanski returned to the indoor game in 1995 with the Washington Warthogs of the Continental Indoor Soccer League (CISL).

=== National team ===
Radwanski earned five caps with the U.S. national team in 1985. His first cap came in a February 8, 1985 tie with Switzerland. On May 26, 1985, he played in a 1986 FIFA World Cup qualification match, a 1–1 tie with Costa Rica in Costa Rica. However, he did not enter the return game in Torrance, California in which Costa Rica defeated the U.S. and knocked them out of contention for the finals. His last cap came in a 5–0 loss to England on June 16, 1985.

In 1992, he earned one cap with the U.S. National Futsal Team.

== Coach ==
Following his retirement from playing professionally, Radwanski assisted his alma mater's soccer program as an assistant coach in 1998 while also working in the Carolina Dynamo’s front office. In 1998 and 1999, he served as the Director of Coaching for the Greensboro Twisters youth club. He moved to the ranks of professional coaching in 1999, he coached the Piedmont Spark of the second division women's W-2 League. That year, Radwanski coached the club to the best record in the W-2 before falling to the Hampton Roads Piranhas in the first round of the playoffs. On February 15, 2001, he replaced Jack Poland as the head coach of the UNCG women's soccer head coach. In 2006, he was named the Southern Conference Coach of the Year in 2006. Radwanski has continued his involvement in youth soccer with the Twisters and the Jamestown Soccer Club in addition to his duties as a college soccer coach. In 2011, Radwanski replaced Hershey Strosberg as coach of the Clemson Tigers women's soccer team. On August 15, 2014, Radwanski was named in a lawsuit by Haley Ellen Hunt related to an alleged hazing incident on August 18, 2011. In 2016, Radwanski was named ACC Coach of the year after leading Clemson to a 13–3–3 regular season record. In 2017, Radwanski won his 200th career game as a coach in a match against SIU Edwardsville.

=== Head coaching record ===
Record table
Season	Team	Overall	Conference	Standing	Postseason
UNC Greensboro (SoCon) (2001–2010)
2001	UNC Greensboro	15–8–0	8–2–0	1st	NCAA 1st Round
2002	UNC Greensboro	7–12–2	4–5–1		
2003	UNC Greensboro	15–7–2	9–2–0		NCAA 2nd Round
2004	UNC Greensboro	14–5–1	9–1–1	1st	
2005	UNC Greensboro	11–7–1	6–3–1		
2006	UNC Greensboro	13–8–2	9–0–1	1st	NCAA 1st Round
2007	UNC Greensboro	16–5–1	10–0–0	1st	NCAA 2nd Round
2008	UNC Greensboro	16–4–3	10–0–1	1st	
2009	UNC Greensboro	13–7–0	9–2–0	1st	
2010	UNC Greensboro	19–2–1	11–0–0	1st	NCAA 1st Round
UNC Greensboro:		139–65–13	85–15–5		
Clemson University (Atlantic Coast Conference) (2011–present)
2011	Clemson	6–12–0	0–10–0	11th	
2012	Clemson	6–10–2	1–9–0	10th	
2013	Clemson	7–8–4	4–7–2	10th	
2014	Clemson	13–3–3	6–3–1	5th	NCAA First Round
2015	Clemson	14–2–4	7–3–0	4th	NCAA Second Round
2016	Clemson	14–5–4	7–1–2	T-1st	NCAA Sweet 16
2017	Clemson	10–5–4	3–4–3	9th	NCAA Second Round
2018	Clemson	12–9–0	6–4–0	6th	NCAA First Round
2019	Clemson	11–6–1	5–5–0	T-6th	NCAA First Round
2020	Clemson	12–5–2	5–3–0	4th	NCAA Quarterfinal
2021	Clemson	12–7–1	6–3–1	5th	NCAA First Round
2022	Clemson	8–5–5	4–3–3	7th	NCAA First Round
2023	Clemson	18–4–4	7–2–1	3rd	NCAA College Cup
2024	Clemson	6–8–3	2–7–1	14th	
2025	Clemson	8–6–5	4–4–2	11th	NCAA Second Round
Clemson:		157–95–42	67–68–16		
Total:		296–160–56			
National champion Postseason invitational champion Conference regular season champion Conference regular season and conference tournament champion Division regular season champion Division regular season and conference tournament champion Conference tournament champion

== Honors ==
Championships

- Dallas Sidekicks: 1986–87
- Dallas Rockets: 1991
- Greensboro Dynamo: 1993, 1994

USISL MPV: 1993

USISL Championship MVP: 1993

Southern Conference Coach of the Year: 2006

Inducted into the UNC-Greensboro Athletics Hall of Fame: 2000

New Jersey first team high school All Decade (1980s)

NSCAA Regional Coach of the Year (2015)
