= Todd Bramble =

American soccer coach

Personal information
- Full name: Todd Bramble
- Date of birth: April 5, 1967 (age 59)
- Place of birth: Atlanta, Georgia, United States
- Position: Goalkeeper

College career
Years	Team	Apps	(Gls)
1985–1989	Mercer Bears		

Senior career*
Years	Team	Apps	(Gls)
1989–1990	Memphis Rogues		

Managerial career
- 1991–1994: Brown (men) (assistant)
- 1995–1999: Clemson (men) (assistant)
- 2000: Butler (men)
- 2001–2007: Clemson (women)
- 2008–2014: Alabama (women)
- 2015–2021: George Mason (women)
- 2023: George Mason (women) (Interim)
- * Club domestic league appearances and goals

Todd Bramble (born 1967) is an American soccer coach. He is currently the deputy athletic director for intercollegiate sports at George Mason.

== Education ==
Bramble received a business management degree from Mercer University in 1989.

== Playing career ==
Bramble played for the Mercer Bears while earning his business management degree. He was a two time all-conference goalkeeper while playing with the Bears. Bramble spent one year playing for the Memphis Rogues of the National Professional Soccer League.

== Coaching career ==
Bramble began his coaching career at Brown University, where he was an assistant to Trevor Adair for the men's soccer team. In 1995, Bramble followed Adair to Clemson University to continue as an assistant coach for the men's team. In 1999, Bramble was an assistant coach with the USA U-17 team in the world championships. After his international experience, Bramble spent 1 season as the head coach of the Butler Bulldogs men's soccer team. In 2011, he returned to Clemson University to coach their women's soccer team. Bramble replaced Ray Leone as head coach. Bramble spent seven years as head coach at Clemson. The women's team made an appearance in the NCAA Tournament in each of his 7 seasons there. Bramble left Clemson after the 2007 season to become head coach at the University of Alabama. Bramble coached the Alabama Crimson Tide women's soccer team for seven seasons before leaving in 2014 to become the head coach of the women's soccer team at George Mason University. Bramble left his post as George Mason women's soccer coach in June 2021, when he was named deputy athletic director for intercollegiate sports at George Mason.

== Administrative career ==
After the retirement of Kevin McNamee as deputy athletic director at George Mason, Bramble was named the deputy athletic director for intercollegiate sports.

== Personal life ==
Bramble has two children: Cole (son) and Morgan (daughter).
