= Ray Leone =

American soccer coach

Personal information
- Full name: Ray Leone
- Place of birth: Severna Park, Maryland, U.S.

Team information
- Current team: St. Bonaventure Bonnies

College career
Years	Team	Apps	(Gls)
1981–1985	Charlotte 49ers		

Managerial career
- 1986–1988: Berry College
- 1989–1993: Creighton
- 1994–1998: Clemson (Assistant)
- 1999–2000: Clemson
- 2001–2006: Arizona State
- 2007–2015: Harvard
- 2016–2021: Maryland
- 2026–: St. Bonaventure Bonnies

Ray Leone is an American soccer coach. He has coached women's soccer at six different schools and founded soccer programs at Berry College and Creighton University.

== Education ==
Leone earned a bachelor's degree in sociology from University of North Carolina at Charlotte.

== Playing career ==
Leone played at UNCC while earning his degree. Leone was a three time all-conference selection at three different positions during his playing time there.

== Coaching career ==
Leone began his coaching career at Berry College, where he started a soccer program. In his first year, he took the program to the national title game. Leone is the only head coach to accomplish this feat. The following year, Berry won the national championship under Leone's guidance. In 1988, Leone left Berry to found at soccer program at Creighton University. In 1994 he left Creighton to become assistant coach at Clemson University. In 1999, Leone was promoted to head coach of the Clemson women's soccer team. Leone was promoted after his wife, Tracey Leone accepted a position to coach with the United States U-19. After leading the Tigers to the ACC Championship in the 2000 season, Leone left for the head coaching position at Arizona State University. Leone is Arizona State University's winning-est women's soccer coach in their history. In 2006, Leone left Arizona State for the head coaching position at Harvard University. Leone coached at Harvard for nine seasons, leading the Crimson to five Ivy League championships. Leone was named Ivy League Coach of the Year in 2014. In 2016, Leone resigned as Harvard coach to accept a head coaching role with the University of Maryland. Leone stayed at Maryland for six seasons, finishing with a 27–60–18 overall record. His contract was not renewed after the 2021 season.

== Personal life ==
Leone is married to Tracey Leone. The pair are both women's college soccer coaches. As of 2014, they are the only two coaches in Division 1 college soccer who are married. The pair have coached together at Creighton, Clemson, Arizona State, and Harvard.
