= Hayley Dowd =

American soccer player

Personal information
- Date of birth: September 7, 1994 (age 32)
- Place of birth: Peabody, Massachusetts
- Height: 1.74 m (5 ft 9 in)
- Position: Striker

Team information
- Current team: AS Saint-Étienne

College career
Years	Team	Apps	(Gls)
2013–2016	Boston College Eagles	83	(39)

Senior career*
Years	Team	Apps	(Gls)
2017	Boston Breakers	1	(0)
2018	Ljusdals IF	11	(7)
2019–2020	Morön BK	52	(48)
2021–2023	Djurgården	57	(14)
2024	AS Saint-Étienne	11	(0)
- * Club domestic league appearances and goals as of 20 July 2024

Hayley Dowd (born September 7, 1994) is an American professional soccer player who played as a striker for AS Saint-Étienne. She previously played for Djurgården and the Boston Breakers.

== Early life and education ==
Raised in Peabody Massachusetts, Dowd attended Peabody High School from 2009 to 2012. As of December 2020, she remains the school's all-time leading scorer. Boston Herald called her "one of the most prolific scorers in state history." She finished her high school career with 148 goals and 56 assists (204 points). A four time Herald All-Scholastic honoree, she led the varsity soccer team to a state championship win in 2011 and was named Gatorade Player of the Year.

== Club career ==
Dowd played for Morön BK for the 2019 and 2020 seasons. During the 2019 season, she scored 33 goals and won the league's Golden Boot award for most goals scored. During the 2020 Elitettan season, she scored 15 goals.

Dowd signed with Djurgårdens IF in Sweden's top league, the Damallsvenskan, for the 2021 season.
