= Nikki Serlenga =

American soccer player (born 1978)

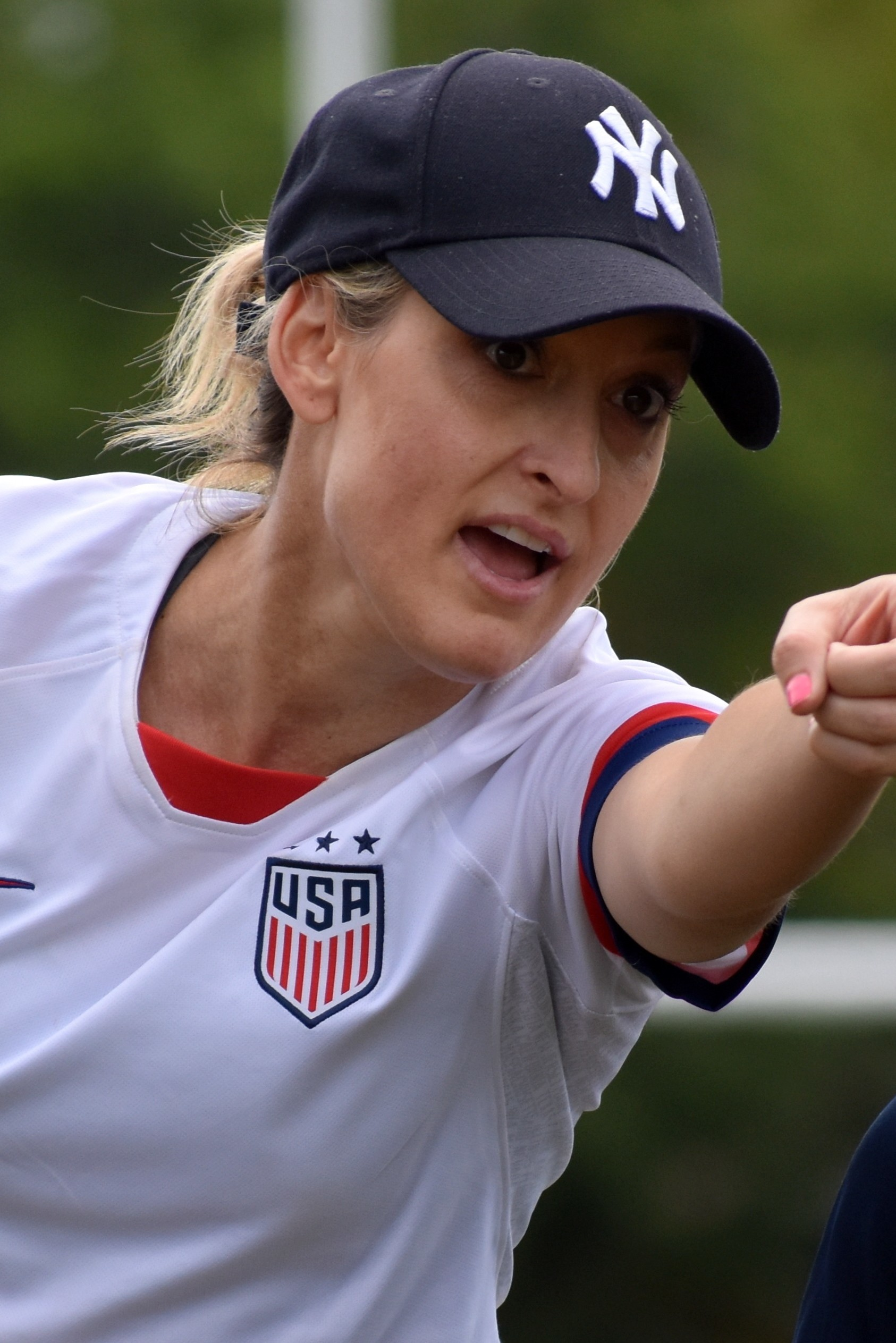
- Serlenga in 2019

Personal information
- Full name: Nichole Lee Serlenga
- Date of birth: June 20, 1978 (age 48)
- Place of birth: San Diego, California, U.S.
- Position: Midfielder

College career
Years	Team	Apps	(Gls)
1996–1999	Santa Clara Broncos		

Senior career*
Years	Team	Apps	(Gls)
2001–2003	Atlanta Beat		

International career
1999	United States U20		
2000–2001	United States	30	(6)
Medal record
Women's football (soccer)
Representing the United States
Olympic Games
Silver medal – second place	2000 Sydney	Team
- * Club domestic league appearances and goals

Nichole Lee Serlenga (born June 20, 1978) is an American retired soccer player. She is a former United States women's national soccer team player and received a silver medal as a member of the 2000 U.S. Olympic Team.

== Early life ==
Born in San Diego, California, Serlenga scored 103 career goals for San Pasqual High School (Escondido, California).

== Collegiate career ==
Serlenga attended Santa Clara University and finished her college career with 15 goals and 28 assists in 84 matches. She was a two-time First-Team NSCAA All-American and helped the Santa Clara Broncos to four consecutive Final Fours.

== Club career ==
Serlenga played for the Atlanta Beat in the Women's United Soccer Association (WUSA) in 2001.

== International career ==
Serlenga was a member of the U-20 National Team pool in 1999. She was called up to the United States women's national soccer team and earned her first cap and goal on January 7, 2000, against Czech Republic.

She represented the United States at the 2000 Summer Olympics in Sydney, Australia and was a member of the silver medal-winning team.

== International goals ==
No.	Date	Venue	Opponent	Score	Result	Competition
1.	7 January 2000	Olympic Park Stadium, Melbourne, Australia	Czech Republic	3–0	8–1	2000 Australia Cup
2.	5 May 2000	Portland, United States	Mexico	?–0	8–0	Friendly
3.	25 June 2000	Cardinal Stadium, Louisville, United States	Costa Rica	1–0	8–0	2000 CONCACAF Gold Cup
4.	25 June 2000	Cardinal Stadium, Louisville, United States	Costa Rica	5–0	8–0	2000 CONCACAF Gold Cup
5.	25 June 2000	Cardinal Stadium, Louisville, United States	Costa Rica	6–0	8–0	2000 CONCACAF Gold Cup
6.	25 July 2000	Tromsø, Norway	Norway	1–?	1–1	Friendly

== See also ==
- United States women's national soccer team
- Atlanta Beat
