= Kristina Fisher =

American soccer player (born 1998)

Personal information
- Full name: Kristina Elizabeth Fisher
- Date of birth: July 1, 1998 (age 28)
- Height: 5 ft 5 in (1.65 m)
- Position: Midfielder

Youth career
- 2012–2013: Florida FC
- 2013–2014: Boca United
- 2014–2015: Albion Hurricanes
- 2015: Orlando City

College career
Years	Team	Apps	(Gls)
2016–2019	Miami Hurricanes	69	(12)

Senior career*
Years	Team	Apps	(Gls)
2020–2022	Sporting de Huelva	68	(2)
- * Club domestic league appearances and goals

Kristina Elizabeth Fisher (born July 1, 1998) is an American former professional soccer player who played for Spanish Liga F club Sporting de Huelva.

== Early life ==
Fisher was raised in Jupiter, Florida to Dr. Kea Apilado Fisher.

== Junior career ==
Fisher played in her under-12 and under-13 years for Florida FC, in her under-14 and under 15 years for Boca United, in her under-16 and under-17 years for Albion Hurricanes in Texas, and finally played one season before college for Orlando City at youth level in the Elite Clubs National League (ECNL). In July 2015, she was called-up for ECNL's Nike national training camp.

== College career ==
Fisher played four seasons for Miami Hurricanes from 2016 until 2020, playing 69 games and scoring 12 goals. Early in her first season, on August 23, 2016, she was named as NSCAA College Player of the Week, after scoring three goals and having three assists in two matches. She was praised for her excellent performances, playing as a playmaker, but she gave credit to her team. At the end of the 2016 year, she earned All-Freshman Team honors.

== Club career ==
In January 2020, Fisher joined Spanish Primera Division club Sporting de Huelva. In July 2020, following five games she played, the club renewed her contract.

== International career ==
In February 2013, Fisher was called up to a training camp in Chula Vista, California of the under-15 national team. Four years later, she was called up to a training camp of the under-23 national team, including four friendlies against National Women's Soccer League clubs. A few months later, she was called up to another training camp in Seattle. A few months later, she was called up to a training camp of the under-20 national team in Sunrise, Florida. In March 2018, Fisher was called up to a training camp of the under-23 national team, taking place at University of Portland. During the camp, she made appearances in the matches against Houston Dash and Chicago Red Stars.
