= Susan Bush =

American soccer player and coach (born 1980)

Personal information
- Full name: Susan Elizabeth Quill
- Birth name: Susan Elizabeth Bush
- Date of birth: November 10, 1980 (age 45)
- Place of birth: Houston, Texas, U.S.
- Height: 5 ft 4 in (1.63 m)
- Position: Forward

Team information
- Current team: Dallas Episcopal Eagles (coach); SouthStar FC (coach)

Youth career
- Challenge Soccer Club

College career
Years	Team	Apps	(Gls)
1999–2002	North Carolina Tar Heels	71	(20)

Senior career*
Years	Team	Apps	(Gls)
2003	San Diego Spirit	12	(0)

International career
- United States U21
1998–2000	United States	10	(3)

Managerial career
- 2003: North Carolina Tar Heels (assistant)
- 2005–2006: Houston Cougars (assistant)
- 2007–2012: Houston Cougars
- 2012–2014: Kinkaid Falcons
- 2014–2019: St. John's Mavericks
- 2019–: Dallas Episcopal Eagles
- 2019–: SouthStar FC
- * Club domestic league appearances and goals

Susan Elizabeth Quill (née Bush; born November 10, 1980) is an American former soccer player and current coach who played as a forward, making ten appearances for the United States women's national team.

== Career ==
Bush played for Challenge Soccer Club in her youth, where she won five state championships. In high school, she did not play soccer for the St. John's Rebels, instead competing in field hockey, where she was a four-year letter-winner and all-conference player in her senior year. She also played basketball as a point guard for two seasons, and participated in one year of lacrosse. She was a Parade High School All-American in 1998 and 1999, and Parade High School Player of the Year in 1999. In college, she played for the North Carolina Tar Heels from 1999 to 2002, where she was a letter-winner. She won the NCAA championship in 1999 and 2000, and was the team captain as a senior. Despite being injured throughout her first three seasons, she scored 20 goals and recorded 36 assists in 71 total appearances for the Tar Heels. She was a Soccer Buzz Third-Team All-American in 2002, and was included in the NCAA All-Tournament team in 1999 as the offensive MVP. She was also a Soccer Buzz Freshman Third-Team All-American in 1999, as well as a finalist for the Hermann Trophy in 2002.

Bush began with the U.S. under-21 national team, competing at the Nordic Cup in 1998, 1999, and 2000, the latter two of which the U.S. won. She was the only high school player in the U.S. senior training camp for the 1999 FIFA Women's World Cup. She made her international debut for the United States on December 16, 1998 in a friendly match against Ukraine. In total, she made ten appearances for the U.S. and scored three goals, earning her final cap on July 7, 2000 in a friendly match against Italy.

In club soccer, Bush was selected by the San Diego Spirit in the 2003 WUSA Draft. She made 12 appearances for the team in the 2003 season. However, she had to retire from professional soccer due to knee injuries.

Bush hold a U.S. Soccer "A" license. While still attending North Carolina, she served as a student assistant of the Tar Heels in 2003. She served as the assistant coach of the Houston Cougars for two seasons, before serving as the head coach from 2007 to 2012. Later, she was the girls' varsity soccer coach at The Kinkaid School from 2012 to 2014, and St. John's School, her alma mater, from 2014 to 2019. In 2019, she was appointed as the head coach of varsity girls' soccer at the Episcopal School of Dallas. She also coaches the WPSL club SouthStar FC in Fort Worth, Texas which had their inaugural season in 2019.

== Personal life ==
Bush is a native of Houston. She graduated from the University of North Carolina at Chapel Hill in 2004 with a Bachelor of Arts, double-majoring in history and political science. She has three children, and is married to Eric Quill, former soccer player and current coach who served as her assistant while with the Houston Cougars.

== Career statistics ==
=== International ===
United States
Year	Apps	Goals
1998	2	0
1999	1	0
2000	7	3
Total	10	3

=== International goals ===
No.	Date	Location	Opponent	Score	Result	Competition	Ref.
1	January 7, 2000	Melbourne, Australia	Czech Republic	2–0	8–1	2000 Australia Cup	
2	June 25, 2000	Louisville, Kentucky, United States	Costa Rica	3–0	8–0	2000 CONCACAF Women's Gold Cup	
3	July 7, 2000	Central Islip, New York, United States	Italy	3–1	4–1	Friendly	

== Honors ==
United States

- Australia Cup: 2000
- CONCACAF Women's Championship: 2000
