= Kelly Haxton =

Canadian soccer player

Personal information
- Full name: Kelly Leanne Haxton
- Date of birth: September 2, 1982 (age 44)
- Place of birth: Calgary, Alberta, Canada
- Height: 5 ft 9 in (1.75 m)
- Positions: Midfielder; defender

College career
Years	Team	Apps	(Gls)
2000–2002	Nebraska Cornhuskers	58	(8)
2003	Purdue Boilermakers		

Senior career*
Years	Team	Apps	(Gls)
2003–2004	Vancouver Whitecaps	13	(1)

International career
1999–2003	Canada U23	9	(6)
2000	Canada	6	(1)
Medal record
Women's soccer
Representing Canada
Pan American Games
Silver medal – second place	2003 Santo Domingo	Team
- * Club domestic league appearances and goals

Kelly Leanne Haxton (born September 2, 1982, in Calgary, Alberta) is a Canadian former soccer defender, who won the silver medal with the Canadian national team at the 2003 Pan American Games. She competed on the Canadian national team (roster and player pool) from 1999 to 2003.

== Club career ==
Haxton signed for Vancouver Whitecaps FC of the W-League midway through the 2003 season.
