= Marcia Wallis =

American soccer player (born 1981)

Personal information
- Date of birth: March 31, 1981 (age 45)
- Place of birth: Los Gatos, California, United States
- Height: 5 ft 7 in (1.70 m)
- Position: Forward

College career
Years	Team	Apps	(Gls)
1999–2002	Stanford Cardinal		(49)

Senior career*
Years	Team	Apps	(Gls)
2003	Boston Breakers	3	(0)
2003	Carolina Courage	8	(0)

International career
1999	United States U18		
2002	United States U21		
- * Club domestic league appearances and goals

Marcia Wallis (born March 31, 1981, in Los Gatos, California) is a retired American soccer player who played for Carolina Courage.

== Career ==
Wallis attended Stanford University and played for the university team, when in 2003 she was the Pac-10 player of the year and appeared on the cover of Sports Illustrated along with seven other college athletes. She was a second round pick in the 2003 WUSA Draft for the Boston Breakers, but left midway through the season due to a lack of playing time, and went on to play for the Carolina Courage.
