= Tracey Leone =

American soccer player (born 1967)

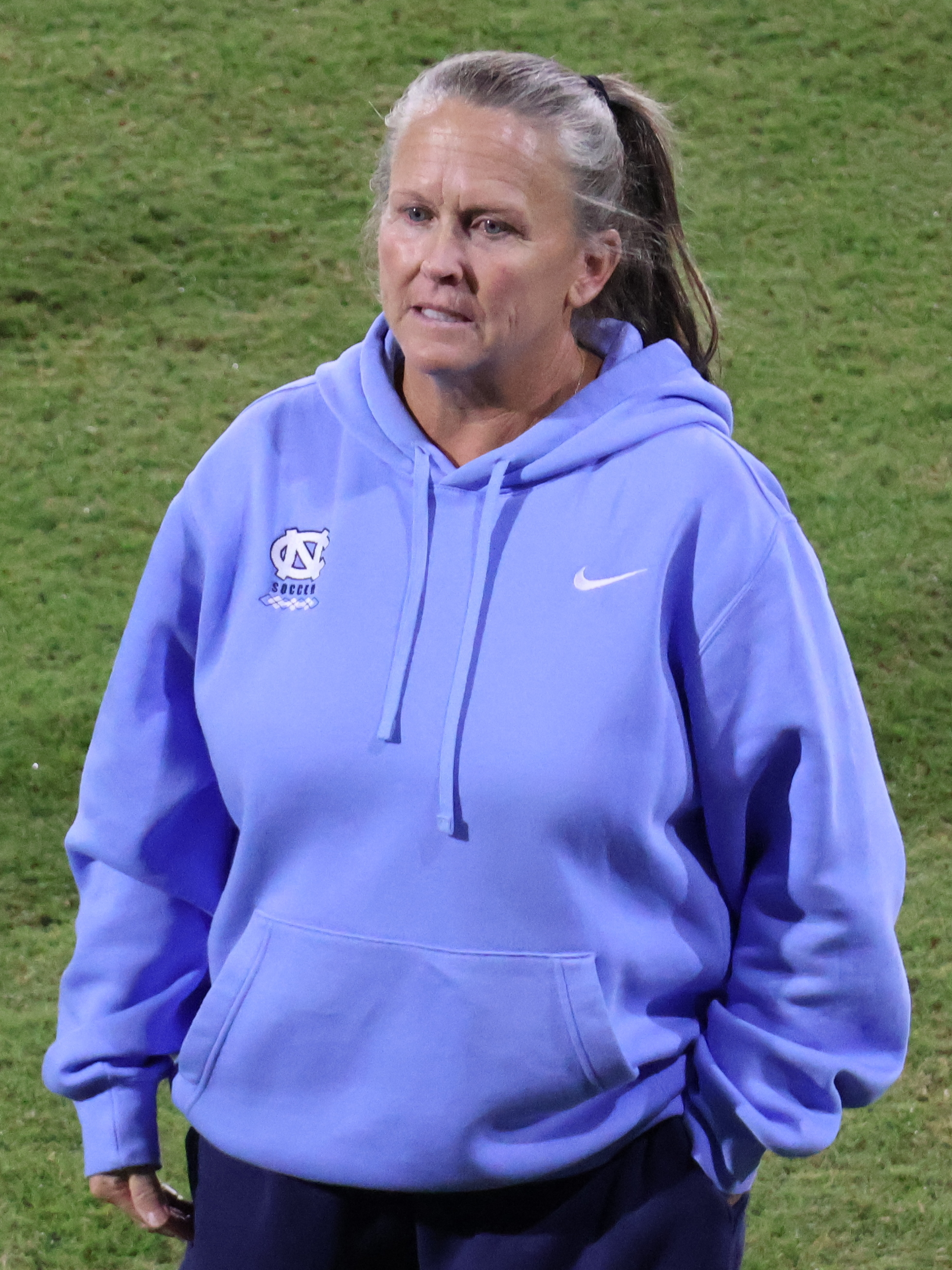
- Leone with the North Carolina Tar Heels in 2024

Personal information
- Full name: Tracey Marie Leone
- Birth name: Tracey Marie Bates
- Date of birth: May 5, 1967 (age 59)
- Place of birth: Dallas, Texas, United States
- Position: Midfielder

College career
Years	Team	Apps	(Gls)
1985–1989	North Carolina Tar Heels		

International career
1987–1991	United States	29	(5)

Managerial career
- 1991–1992: Creighton Bluejays (assistant)
- 1993–1999: Clemson Tigers
- 2000–2003: United States U-19
- 2004: United States (assistant)
- 2005–2006: Arizona State Sun Devils (assistant)
- 2007–2009: Harvard Crimson (assistant)
- 2010–2015: Northeastern Huskies
- 2022–2023: Colby Mules
- 2024–: North Carolina Tar Heels (assistant)

Tracey Marie Leone (née Bates; born May 5, 1967) is an American retired soccer midfielder who was a member of the United States national team. She was the first American to win a world championship as both a player and as a head coach. She became an assistant coach for her alma mater North Carolina Tar Heels in 2024.

== International career statistics ==
Nation	Year	International Appearances				
Nation	Year	Apps	Starts	Minutes	Goals	Assists
United States	1987	7	5	480	0	0
United States	1988	6	6	423	1	0
United States	1989	1	1	90	0	0
United States	1990	3	1	180	0	0
United States	1991	12	8	873	4	2
Career Total	5	29	21	2046	5	2

== Personal life ==
Leone is married to Ray Leone. The pair are both women's college soccer coaches. As of 2014, they are the only two coaches in Division 1 college soccer who are married. The pair have coached together at Creighton, Clemson, Arizona State, and Harvard.
