= Siri Mullinix =

American soccer player and coach (born 1978)

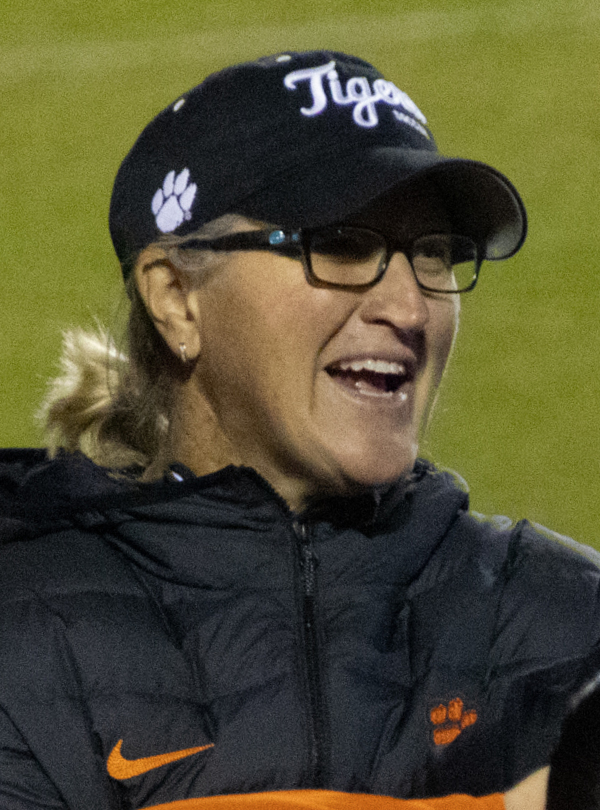
- Mullinix with Clemson in 2025

Personal information
- Full name: Siri Lynn Mullinix
- Date of birth: May 22, 1978 (age 48)
- Place of birth: Denver, Colorado, U.S.
- Height: 5 ft 7 in (1.70 m)
- Position: Goalkeeper

Youth career
- 1990–1995: '78 Greensboro Twisters

College career
Years	Team	Apps	(Gls)
1995–98	North Carolina Tar Heels		

Senior career*
Years	Team	Apps	(Gls)
1999	Raleigh Wings	4	(0)
2001–2003	Washington Freedom	51	(0)

International career
1999–2004	United States	45	(0)

Managerial career
- 2005–2008: UNC Greensboro Spartans (assistant)
- 2009–2010: VCU Rams (assistant)
- 2011–: Clemson Tigers (assistant)
Medal record
Women's football (soccer)
Representing the United States
Olympic Games
Silver medal – second place	2000 Sydney	Team competition
- * Club domestic league appearances and goals

Siri Lynn Mullinix (born May 22, 1978) is an American retired soccer goalkeeper who is an assistant coach for the Clemson Tigers women's soccer team. As keeper for the 2000 U.S. women's Olympic soccer team, she recorded two shutouts helping the team win the silver medal. In 2010, Mullinix was inducted into the North Carolina Soccer Hall of Fame.

== College career ==
In her four years with the University of North Carolina, she played 90 games earning 43 shutouts and a goals against average of 0.27. She was named the Defensive MVP in the 1997 NCAA tournament where she earned a 120-minute shutout in the final against Notre Dame. In her four years with the UNC Tar Heels, the team won the ACC title four times and the NCAA title twice.

== National team ==
Her first start with the U.S. women's national team came in a game against Japan in Atlanta on May 2, 1999. She recorded her first national team shutout on March 12, 2000, against Portugal. In her national team career, she played in 29 games with 28 starts. She set a team record by earning 15 shutouts in 2000 for an 18-5-5 record and a 0.60 goals against average. Mullinix won the silver medal in women's football as a member of the U.S. team at the 2000 Summer Olympics.

== Professional career ==
At the launch of the Women's United Soccer Association in 2001, Mullinix was allocated to the Washington Freedom where she won 5 of her 18 starts that inaugural season. She won 7 games in the 2002 season and led the league in save percentage that year (80.8%). She played in the league championship game in 2002 and won it in 2003 when she was also named to the WUSA All-Star team. Mullinix and teammate Mia Hamm were the first inductees into the Washington Freedom's "Hall of Freedom".

== Coaching career ==
On May 23, 2005, Mullinix was named assistant coach under Eddie Radwanski for the UNC Greensboro women's soccer team. In 2009, she became the goalkeeping coach for the Virginia Commonwealth University women's team while also enrolling as a student. After three years at VCU she rejoined Radwanski as an assistant coach at Clemson. On August 15, 2014, Mullinix was named in a lawsuit by Haley Ellen Hunt related to an alleged hazing incident on August 18, 2011. In early 2016, the lawsuit was dismissed.
