= Kim Patrick =

American soccer player

Personal information
- Full name: Kimberly Erin Patrick
- Date of birth: March 17, 1981 (age 45)
- Place of birth: Walnut Creek, California
- Height: 5 ft 5 in (1.65 m)
- Position: Forward

College career
Years	Team	Apps	(Gls)
1999–2000	North Carolina Tar Heels		
2001–2002	Tennessee Lady Volunteers		

Senior career*
Years	Team	Apps	(Gls)
2003	San Jose CyberRays	1	(0)
- * Club domestic league appearances and goals

Kimberly Erin Patrick (born March 17, 1981) is an American soccer player who played for the San Jose CyberRays.

== Career ==
While attending the University of North Carolina at Chapel Hill, Patrick played for the university's soccer team, during which time she won the NCAA national championships. Her success in college soccer lead her to be spotted by professional soccer teams in the Women's United Soccer Association. In 2003 Kim Patrick was signed by the San Jose CyberRays as developmental player.

== Honours ==
- NCAA national championships -1999
