= Bridgette Andrzejewski =

American soccer player

Personal information
- Full name: Bridgette Ann Andrzejewski
- Date of birth: January 27, 1997 (age 29)
- Place of birth: Towson, Maryland, United States
- Height: 1.72 m (5 ft 8 in)
- Position: Forward

College career
Years	Team	Apps	(Gls)
2016–2019	North Carolina Tar Heels	101	(28)

Senior career*
Years	Team	Apps	(Gls)
2020–2021	Houston Dash	0	(0)
- * Club domestic league appearances and goals

Bridgette Ann Andrzejewski (born January 27, 1997) is an American former professional soccer player who last played as a forward for Houston Dash of the National Women's Soccer League (NWSL).

== Club career ==
Andrzejewski made her professional debut for the Houston Dash on September 12, 2020. She retired from playing on April 23, 2021.

== Honors ==
Houston Dash

- NWSL Challenge Cup: 2020
