= Notre Dame Fighting Irish women's soccer =

American college soccer team

- 2025 Notre Dame Fighting Irish women's soccer team
- University: University of Notre Dame
- Athletic director: Pete Bevacqua
- Head coach: Nate Norman (9th season)
- Conference: ACC
- Location: Notre Dame, Indiana, US
- Stadium: Alumni Stadium (capacity: 2,500)
- Nickname: Fighting Irish
- Colors: Blue and gold
Home	Away

NCAA tournament championships
- 1995, 2004, 2010

NCAA tournament runner-up
- 1994, 1996, 1999, 2006, 2008

NCAA tournament Semifinals
- 1994, 1995, 1996, 1997, 1999, 2000, 2004, 2006, 2007, 2008, 2009, 2010

NCAA tournament Quarterfinals
- 1994, 1995, 1996, 1997, 1998, 1999, 2000, 2004, 2005, 2006, 2007, 2008, 2009, 2010, 2012, 2022, 2024

NCAA tournament Round of 16
- 1993, 1994, 1995, 1996, 1997, 1998, 1999, 2000, 2002, 2004, 2005, 2006, 2007, 2008, 2009, 2010, 2012, 2013, 2014, 2017, 2021, 2022, 2024

NCAA tournament appearances
- 1993, 1994, 1995, 1996, 1997, 1998, 1999, 2000, 2001, 2002, 2003, 2004, 2005, 2006, 2007, 2008, 2009, 2010, 2011, 2012, 2013, 2014, 2015, 2016, 2017, 2019, 2021, 2022, 2023, 2024, 2025

Conference tournament championships
- 1995, 1996, 1997, 1998, 1999, 2000, 2001, 2005, 2006, 2008, 2009

The Notre Dame Fighting Irish women's soccer team is the team that represents the University of Notre Dame in National Collegiate Athletic Association Division I women's soccer. The team competes in the Atlantic Coast Conference and they are currently coached by Nate Norman, following the resignation of Theresa Romagnolo. The Fighting Irish have won three NCAA national championships.

== History ==
Notre Dame's women's soccer team won the National Championship in 1995, 2004 and 2010 and were the runner-up in 1994, 1996, 1999, 2006, and 2008. Notre Dame also ranks second in all-time title game appearances (8) behind North Carolina (24). Notre Dame's women's soccer program started in 1988 under coach Chris Petrucelli. Their 1995 Big East title was the university's first in any sport. That same year, Petrucelli's squad, under the leadership of Cindy Daws, won the program's first national title, defeating Portland 1–0. Randy Waldrum, took over the program in 1999 and maintained the Fighting Irish's success, winning the national title in 2004 by beating UCLA 4–3 as well as capturing six Big East titles.

Waldrum's 2010 squad won the school's third national title, going 21–2–2 and posting 15 shutouts and became the lowest ranked team to do so, beating undefeated Stanford in a 1–0 decision. In doing so, they outscored their postseason opponents 15–1. They also reached the College Cup for the fifth straight year, a school record. Their senior class won 87 matches in their 4 years, the most in that span. Three Notre Dame players have won the Hermann Trophy, given to the United States' best male and female collegiate soccer players. They are Cindy Daws (1996), Anne Mäkinen (2000) and Kerri Hanks (2006, 2008). Hanks is one of only four players to win the award twice. Notre Dame is also one of only two schools with three or more different Hermann Trophy recipients.

On October 19, 2014, Elizabeth Tucker received the 2014 NCAA Woman of the Year Award. Elizabeth Tucker is also the first student-athlete in Notre Dame history to sweep all four of the university's major athletics honors in the same year.

On January 3, 2014, Waldrum resigned after 15 seasons with the Fighting Irish to become the head coach of newly established NWSL team Houston Dash. On March 19, 2014, Theresa Romagnolo was appointed as his successor. Prior to coaching the Fighting Irish, Romagnolo had been the women's soccer head coach at Dartmouth the past three seasons, and had also been an assistant coach at Stanford and at the University of San Diego. Romagnolo resigned on January 22, 2018, citing the desire to spend more time with her family. Assistant coach Nate Norman was promoted to head coach on February 20, 2018.

== Players ==
=== Current roster ===
As of November 2026

Note: Flags indicate national team as defined under FIFA eligibility rules; some limited exceptions apply. Players may hold more than one non-FIFA nationality.

No.	Pos.	Nation	Player
0	GK	USA	Jackie Hollomon
2	DF	CAN	Clare Logan
3	MF	USA	Izzy Engle
4	DF	USA	Gabi Poretto
5	FW	USA	Marley Adams
6	FW	USA	Paige Buchner
7	FW	CAN	Annabelle Chukwu
8	FW	USA	Randie Foor
9	MF	USA	Charlie Codd
10	FW	USA	Ellie Hodsden
11	FW	USA	Tessa Knapp
12	FW	USA	Kate Kemmerley
13	DF	USA	Mel Hathaway
14	MF	USA	Gianna Scott
15	MF	USA	Charlee Siria

No.	Pos.	Nation	Player
16	MF	USA	Meg Mrowicki
17	MF	USA	Riley DeMartino
18	FW	USA	Bristol Kersh
19	MF	USA	Ally Pinto
20	DF	USA	Abby Mills
21	MF	PHI	Chayse Ying
22	DF	CAN	Tatiana Tagne
23	DF	USA	Morgan Roy
24	MF	USA	Grace Restovich
25	MF	USA	Reese Canada
26	DF	USA	Gracie Milam
27	MF	USA	Lily Joseph
28	GK	USA	Sonoma Kasica
29	DF	USA	Rowan Pearl
33	GK	USA	Madeleine Agee

=== Individual honors ===
NCAA Woman of the Year Award:

- Elizabeth Tucker – 2014

Hermann Trophy:

- Cindy Daws – 1996
- Anne Mäkinen – 2000
- Kerri Hanks – 2006, 2008

Big East Offensive Player of the Year:

- Katie Thorlakson – 2004, 2005
- Kerri Hanks – 2006, 2008
- Brittany Bock – 2007
- Lauren Fowlkes – 2009
- Melissa Henderson – 2010

Big East Defensive Player of the Year:

- Jen Grubb – 1999
- Candace Chapman – 2002, 2005
- Melissa Tancredi – 2003, 2004
- Carrie Dew – 2008

Big East Midfielder of the Year:

- Anne Mäkinen – 2000
- Jen Buczkowski – 2005
- Courtney Barg – 2009

Big East Rookie of the Year:

- Jenny Streiffer – 1996
- Vanessa Pruzinsky – 1999
- Christie Shaner – 2003
- Kerri Hanks – 2005
- Melissa Henderson – 2008

Big East All-Rookie Team:

- Elizabeth Tucker – 2010

Big East Championship All-Tournament Team:

- Elizabeth Tucker – 2012

U.S. Under-23 Women's National Team:

- Elizabeth Tucker – 2012

Capital One Academic All-America (CoSIDA) First Team:

- Elizabeth Tucker – 2012–2013, 2013–2014

ACC Scholar-Athlete of the Year:

- Elizabeth Tucker – 2014

Notre Dame Byron V. Kanaley Award:

- Elizabeth Tucker – 2014

Notre Dame Francis Patrick O'Connor Award:

- Elizabeth Tucker – 2014

Notre Dame Athletics Community Champion Award:

- Elizabeth Tucker – 2014

Notre Dame Top Gun Award:

- Elizabeth Tucker – 2014

Notre Dame Monogram Club Team Most Valuable Player Award:

- Elizabeth Tucker – 2014

NCAA Postgraduate Scholarship:

- Elizabeth Tucker – 2014

ACC Postgraduate Scholarship:

- Elizabeth Tucker – 2014

== Notable alumni ==
=== Current Professionals ===
As of February 11, 2026

- (United States) Kelly Lindsey (1997–2000) Currently COO of Lewes FC
- Adriana Leon (2010–2011) – Currently with San Diego Wave FC and Canada international
- (United States) Natalie Jacobs (2015–2017) – Currently with North Carolina Courage
- Samantha Fisher (2017–2021) – Currently with Sassuolo and El Salvador international
- (United States) Brianna Martinez (2018–2022) – Currently with Carolina Ascent FC
- (United States) Olivia Wingate (2018–2022) – Currently with North Carolina Courage
- (United States) Bea Franklin (2019–2020) – Currently with Chicago Stars FC
- (United States) Maddie Mercado (2019–2023) – Currently with Seattle Reign FC
- Kiki Van Zanten (2019–2023) – Currently with Houston Dash and Jamaica international
- Eva Gaetino (2020–2023) – Currently with Denver Summit FC and United States international
- Korbin Shrader (2021–2022) – Currently with Paris Saint-Germain and United States international
- (United States) Leah Klenke (2022–2025) – Currently with Houston Dash
- Chayse Ying (2023–present) – Currently representing Philippines international
- Annabelle Chukwu (2024–present) – Currently representing Canada international
- (United States) Carolyn Calzada (2025) – Currently with Portland Thorns FC

== Coaches ==
=== Current staff ===
Position	Staff
Head Coach	Nate Norman
Assistant Coach	Dawn Siergiej
Assistant Coach	Martin Rennie
Assistant Coach	Gina Lewandowski

== Seasons ==
Season	Head coach	Season result							Tournament results	
Season	Head coach	Overall			Conference				Conference	NCAA
Season	Head coach	Wins	Losses	Ties	Wins	Losses	Ties	Finish	Conference	NCAA
1988	Dennis Grace	13	6	1	No Conference					—
1989	Dennis Grace	12	10	0	No Conference					—
1990	Chris Petrucelli	16	3	1	No Conference					—
1991^	Chris Petrucelli	15	2	3	2	0	1	1st	No Tournament	—
1992	Chris Petrucelli	13	5	1	5	0	0	1st	No Tournament	—
1993	Chris Petrucelli	19	3	0	6	0	0	1st	Champions	NCAA First Round
1994	Chris Petrucelli	23	1	1	6	0	0	1st	Champions	NCAA Runner Up
1995†	Chris Petrucelli	21	2	2	7	1	0	2nd	Champions	NCAA Champions
1996	Chris Petrucelli	24	2	0	9	0	0	1st	Champions	NCAA Runner Up
1997	Chris Petrucelli	23	1	1	11	0	0	1st	Champions	NCAA Semifinals
1998	Chris Petrucelli	21	3	1	9	1	1	2nd	Champions	NCAA Quarterfinals
1999	Randy Waldrum	21	4	1	6	0	0	1st (Mid-Atlantic)	Champions	NCAA Runner Up
2000	Randy Waldrum	23	1	1	6	0	0	1st (Mid-Atlantic)	Champions	NCAA Semifinals
2001	Randy Waldrum	17	3	1	5	1	0	1st (Mid-Atlantic)	Champions	NCAA Second Round
2002	Randy Waldrum	13	8	0	3	3	3	T-4th (Mid-Atlantic)	—	NCAA Third Round
2003	Randy Waldrum	20	3	1	6	0	0	1st (Mid-Atlantic)	Semifinal	NCAA Second Round
2004	Randy Waldrum	25	1	1	9	0	1	1st	Runner up	NCAA Champion
2005	Randy Waldrum	22	3	0	10	1	0	1st (National)	Champions	NCAA Quarterfinals
2006	Randy Waldrum	25	1	1	10	0	1	1st (National)	Champions	NCAA Runner up
2007	Randy Waldrum	19	5	2	11	0	0	1st (National)	Runner up	NCAA Semifinals
2008	Randy Waldrum	26	1	0	11	0	0	1st (National)	Champions	NCAA Runner up
2009	Randy Waldrum	21	4	1	10	0	1	1st (National)	Champions	NCAA Semifinals
2010	Randy Waldrum	21	2	2	9	0	2	1st (National)	First round	NCAA Champions
2011	Randy Waldrum	10	8	3	6	3	2	3rd (National)	Semifinals	NCAA First Round
2012	Randy Waldrum	16	6	2	8	1	1	T-1st (National)	Semifinals	NCAA Third Round
2013‡	Randy Waldrum	13	8	1	7	5	1	5th	Quarterfinals	NCAA Third Round
2014	Theresa Romagnolo	14	6	2	7	2	1	4th	Quarterfinals	NCAA Third Round
2015	Theresa Romagnolo	14	5	1	6	4	0	6th	—	NCAA Second Round
2016	Theresa Romagnolo	13	3	5	7	1	2	T-1st	Semifinals	NCAA First Round
2017	Theresa Romagnolo	9	8	5	5	3	2	6th	First round	NCAA Third Round
2018	Nate Norman	8	10	0	4	6	0	10th	—	—
2019	Nate Norman	11	8	2	4	4	2	8th	First round	NCAA Third round
2020	Nate Norman	6	7	0	4	4	0	8th	First round	—
2021	Nate Norman	14	6	2	7	3	0	4th	First round	NCAA Second Round
2022	Nate Norman	17	3	3	7	2	1	3rd	Semifinals	NCAA Quarterfinal
2023	Nate Norman	12	4	4	7	1	2	2nd	Quarterfinals	NCAA Second Round
2024	Nate Norman	14	4	4	5	1	4	2nd	First Round	NCAA Quarterfinal
2025	Nate Norman	15	2	3	8	1	1	2nd	Runner up	NCAA Second Round

^ In 1991, Notre Dame began play in the Horizon League.
† In 1995, Notre Dame began play in the Big East.
‡ In 2013, Notre Dame began play in the Atlantic Coast Conference.
