= Miami Hurricanes women's soccer =

American college soccer team

- 2025 Miami Hurricanes women's soccer team
- Founded: 1998; 28 years ago
- University: University of Miami
- Head coach: Ken Masuhr (2nd season)
- Conference: ACC
- Location: Coral Gables, Florida, U.S.
- Stadium: Cobb Stadium (capacity: 500)
- Nickname: Hurricanes
- Colors: Orange, green, and white
Home	Away

NCAA Tournament Round of 32
- 2011

NCAA Tournament appearances
- 2001, 2007, 2008, 2011, 2012

The Miami Hurricanes women's soccer team represent University of Miami in the Atlantic Coast Conference (ACC) of NCAA Division I women's college soccer.

The team has participated in two conferences, the Big East and the ACC, and has not won a conference championship. The team has advanced to the NCAA Tournament five times but has never made it further than the tournament's second round.

== History ==
=== 1990s ===
The Hurricanes women's soccer program was launched in 1998. The team initially was not part of any collegiated conference. They finished their inaugural season in 1998 with a record of 8–5–1. Jim Blankenship was the program's first coach. In 1999, the women's soccer team joined Big East Conference play at a time when the university was a full member of the conference. The team improved on its previous season, finishing 12–8–0 and 2–3–0 in conference play. The Hurricanes qualified for the Big East Conference Women's Soccer Tournament, but lost in the first round. This was the team's first ever postseason appearance.

=== 2000s ===
The 2000s began with a 9–10–1 season that saw the Hurricanes again qualify for the Big East Tournament. 2001 saw more postseason action when the team qualified for its first ever NCAA Tournament. However, before the 2002 season, head coach Jim Blankenship resigned as head coach. Tricia Taliaferro was hired from Illinois to be the second head coach in the program's history. Overall records of 9–9–1 marked Taliaferro's first two years at the helm. In both seasons, the team finished second in the Big East, and lost in the first round of the Big East Tournament. 2004 marked the Hurricanes first year as a member of the Atlantic Coast Conference. The first season in the ACC proved a difficult one, with the team finishing 3–13–0 overall, and 1–8–0 in the conference. 2005 saw the team end a streak of six conference tournament appearances. In 2007 and 2008, the team made back-to-back ACC Tournament and NCAA Tournament appearances, losing in the first round in all four attempts. 2009 saw the team finish with a similar record but fail to make either tournament.

=== 2010s ===
The Hurricanes started the 2010s with a 10–8–1 record, and failed to qualify for the ACC and NCAA tournament. After the season, Taliaferro was dismissed as head coach. Tom Anagnost was hired as the new head coach prior to the 2011 season. In his first season, the team achieved their best ever NCAA finish, making it to the second round. Another NCAA appearance in 2012 was not enough to save Anagnost's job. After a 9–7–4 overall record, he was relieved of head coaching duties. Shortly thereafter, Mary-Frances Monroe was hired to be the new head coach. Monroe's first few seasons proved difficult, with the team finishing 11th or 12th in the ACC in 2013, 2014, and 2015. 2014 and 2015 also saw the Hurricanes lose double digit games. The team had a slight turnaround in 2016, qualifying for the ACC tournament, but losing in the first round. Following a 5–11 2017 season, Monroe was fired as head coach. Prior to the 2018 season, Sarah Barnes was named the school's new head coach. Her first year saw some improvement with the team finishing 6–9–3, but extended a run of missing the NCAA tournament to six straight years.

=== 2020s ===
The decade started with a season shortened by the COVID-19 pandemic. The Hurricanes finished 1–11–1 and 0–8–0 in ACC play. It was the first time in program history that they finished a season winless in conference play, and it was a program low for total wins in a season. The Hurricanes' struggles continued in 2021, as they finished 4–12–0 overall and 1–9–0 in ACC play. 2022 did not see much improvement for the Hurricanes as they finished 5–8–3 overall and 2–7–1 in conference play. In 2023 the Hurricanes finished 3–10–4 overall and 2–7–1 in ACC play. Their three wins were a program low for a full season, with the only lower win total coming in 2020. After the 2023 season Sarah Barnes was fired as head coach. She had a 24–59–13 record in six seasons as head coach. Ken Mashur was hired as coach prior to the 2024 season.. He was unable to engineer a large turnaround, as the Hurricanes finished 5–8–4 overall and 1–6–3 in ACC play. 2025 saw some improvement under Masuhr, as the team finished 9–8–3 overall and 1–7–2 in the ACC. While their conference record did not improve, their nine total wins were the highest win total of the decade at the time and their highest since the 2016 season.

== Players ==
=== Current roster ===
As of December 29, 2025

Note: Flags indicate national team as defined under FIFA eligibility rules; some limited exceptions apply. Players may hold more than one non-FIFA nationality.

No.	Pos.	Nation	Player
0	GK	USA	Emily Bredek
1	GK	USA	Lauren Rodriguez
2	MF	ENG	Emilie Simpson
3	FW	USA	Noelle Simmons
4	DF	USA	Sam Marella
5	DF	USA	Amanda Peck
6	DF	USA	Tori Grambo
7	FW	USA	Caroline Hood
8	MF	USA	Ciara Alarocn
9	FW	BRA	Giovana Canali
10	DF	IRL	Éabha O'Mahony
11	FW	GER	Cisel Akgül
12	FW	CAN	Teegan Melenhorst
13	MF	USA	Crosby Nicholson

No.	Pos.	Nation	Player
14	DF	USA	Taylor Maxwell
15	FW	USA	Allie Serlenga
16	MF	USA	Sarah Greiner
17	FW	USA	Moira Flynn
18	DF	USA	Lexi Lerwick
19	MF	USA	Maddie Landers
20	DF	USA	Reese Wheeler
21	FW	USA	Maya Paeske
22	FW	USA	Brie Severns
23	FW	JPN	Nanaka Inaba
24	DF	USA	Sasha Brewer
25	FW	USA	Jessica Kaye
33	GK	USA	Atlee Olofson
48	FW	USA	Sage Carey

== Coaches ==
=== Current staff ===
Position	Name
Head Coach	Ken Masuhr
Assistant Coach	Kelly Keelan
Assistant Coach	Peter-John Falloon
Director of Operations	Hannah Bernick
Athletic Trainer	Karl Rennalls

Updated July 13, 2025

== Seasons ==
Season	Head coach	Season results							Tournament results	
Season	Head coach	Overall			Conference				Conference	NCAA
Season	Head coach	Wins	Loss.	Ties	Wins	Loss.	Ties	Finish	Conference	NCAA
1998	Jim Blankenship	8	5	1	No Conference					—
1999^	Jim Blankenship	12	8	0	2	3	0	4th – Northeast	First round	—
2000	Jim Blankenship	9	10	1	2	3	0	4th – Northeast	First round	—
2001	Jim Blankenship	10	9	1	3	2	2	T-2nd – Northeast	First round	NCAA First Round
2002	Tricia Taliaferro	9	9	1	4	1	1	2nd – Northeast	First round	—
2003	Tricia Taliaferro	9	9	1	3	3	0	T-2nd – Northeast	First round	—
2004†	Tricia Taliaferro	3	13	0	1	8	0	T-9th	First Round	–
2005	Tricia Taliaferro	8	11	1	2	8	0	T-9th	—	—
2006	Tricia Taliaferro	8	9	1	1	8	1	11th	—	—
2007	Tricia Taliaferro	9	7	5	4	4	2	T-5th	First round	NCAA First Round
2008	Tricia Taliaferro	10	9	3	3	5	2	8th	First round	NCAA First Round
2009	Tricia Taliaferro	8	10	1	3	6	1	9th	—	—
2010	Tricia Taliaferro	10	8	1	4	6	0	9th	—	—
2011	Tom Anagnost	10	8	1	3	6	1	9th	—	NCAA Second Round
2012	Tom Anagnost	9	7	4	4	4	2	7th	First round	NCAA First Round
2013	Mary-Frances Monroe	9	8	1	4	8	1	11th	—	—
2014	Mary-Frances Monroe	4	13	1	2	7	1	T-11th	—	—
2015	Mary-Frances Monroe	5	12	0	2	8	0	T-12th	—	—
2016	Mary-Frances Monroe	10	8	1	5	5	0	7th	First round	—
2017	Mary-Frances Monroe	5	11	0	1	9	0	13th	—	—
2018	Sarah Barnes	6	9	3	3	6	1	12th	—	—
2019	Sarah Barnes	5	9	2	2	7	1	11th	—	—
2020	Sarah Barnes	1	11	1	0	8	0	13th	—	—
2021	Sarah Barnes	4	12	1	1	9	0	T-12th	—	—
2022	Sarah Barnes	5	8	3	2	7	1	12th	—	—
2023	Sarah Barnes	3	10	4	2	7	1	12th	—	—
2024	Ken Mashur	5	8	4	1	6	3	15th	—	—
2025	Ken Mashur	9	8	3	1	7	2	T-14th	—	—

^In 1999, the Hurricanes began play in the Big East Conference.
†In 2004, the Hurricanes moved to the Atlantic Coast Conference.

== Notable alumni ==
=== Current professional players ===
As of December 29, 2025

- (United States) Bev Yanez (2007–2009) – currently head coach with Racing Louisville FC
- (Colombia) Catalina Pérez – (2013–2016) – currently with RC Strasbourg
- Phallon Tullis-Joyce (2014–2018) – currently with Manchester United, and United States international
- (Canada) Melissa Dagenais – (2019–2023) – currently with Ottawa Rapid FC
- Ena Taslidža (2020–2021) – currently with Turbine Potsdam, and Bosnia and Herzegovina international
