= 2018 ACC women's soccer tournament =

- Classification: Division I
- Teams: 8
- Matches: 7
- Attendance: 6,764
- Site: Sahlen's Stadium; Campus Sites (Quarterfinals); Cary, North Carolina (Semifinals and Final)
- Champions: Florida State (6th title)
- Winning coach: Mark Krikorian (6th title)
- MVP: (United States) Dallas Dorosy (Florida State)
- Broadcast: ACCN (Semifinals), ESPNU (Final)

2018 ACC women's soccer standings
	Conf.						Overall
Team	W		L		T	PCT	W		L		T	PCT
No. 2 North Carolina ‍†‍‍^{y}	10	–	0	–	0	1.000	20	–	4	–	2	.808
No. 10 Duke ‍‍‍^{y}	8	–	1	–	1	.850	16	–	4	–	2	.773
No. 11 Virginia ‍‍‍^{y}	7	–	3	–	0	.700	16	–	5	–	1	.750
Boston College ‍‍‍^{y}	6	–	3	–	1	.650	14	–	5	–	1	.725
Louisville ‍‍‍^{y}	6	–	4	–	0	.600	12	–	7	–	0	.632
No. 25 Clemson ‍‍‍^{y}	6	–	4	–	0	.600	12	–	9	–	0	.571
No. 1 Florida State ‍‍‡‍^{y}	5	–	4	–	1	.550	20	–	4	–	3	.796
No. 21 Virginia Tech ‍‍‍^{y}	5	–	5	–	0	.500	11	–	8	–	3	.568
No. 25 Wake Forest ‍‍‍^{y}	4	–	6	–	0	.400	9	–	9	–	2	.500
Notre Dame ‍‍‍	4	–	6	–	0	.400	8	–	10	–	0	.444
No. 22 NC State ‍‍‍^{y}	3	–	5	–	2	.400	11	–	7	–	4	.591
Miami ‍‍‍	3	–	6	–	1	.350	6	–	9	–	3	.417
Pittsburgh ‍‍‍	0	–	10	–	0	.000	4	–	12	–	1	.265
Syracuse ‍‍‍	0	–	10	–	0	.000	3	–	15	–	0	.167
† – Conference champion ‡ – 2018 ACC Tournament champion y – Invited to the NCAA Tournament; As of December 4, 2018; Rankings from United Soccer Coaches Poll; Source: The ACC

The 2018 ACC women's soccer tournament was the postseason women's soccer tournament for the Atlantic Coast Conference. The defending champions were the North Carolina Tar Heels. However, North Carolina was unable to defend their crown, losing to Florida State in the final.

== Qualification ==
The top eight teams in the Atlantic Coast Conference earned a berth into the ACC Tournament. The quarterfinal round was held at campus sites, while the semifinals and final took place at Sahlen's Stadium in Cary, North Carolina. Clemson received the 5th seed over Louisville due to having a better goal difference in conference games. Five of the eight teams in the tournament were ranked in the United Soccer Coaches poll that was released on Tuesday, October 23, 2018.

Seed	School	Conference Record	Points
1	North Carolina	10–0–0	30
2	Duke	8–1–1	25
3	Virginia	7–3–0	21
4	Boston College	6–3–1	19
5	Clemson	6–4–0	18
6	Louisville	6–4–0	18
7	Florida State	5–4–1	16
8	Virginia Tech	5–5–0	15

== Bracket ==
Quarterfinals; Sunday, October 28
1	North Carolina	2
8	Virginia Tech	0
4	Boston College	0
5	Clemson	1
2	Duke	0
7	Florida State	1
3	Virginia	2
6	Louisville	1

Semifinals; Friday, November 2
1	North Carolina	1
5	Clemson	0
7	Florida State	3
3	Virginia	1

Final; Sunday, November 4
1	North Carolina	2
7	Florida State	3

== Schedule ==
=== Quarterfinals ===
October 28, 2018	#1 North Carolina	2–0	#8 Virginia Tech	Cary, NC
1:00 p.m. EDT	Alex Kimball 2'; Dorian Bailey 88'	Report		Stadium: WakeMed Soccer Park; Attendance: 380; Referee: Sergio Gonzalez; Assistant referees: Javier Rodriguez; David McPhun; Fourth official: Justin Howard

October 28, 2018	#4 Boston College	0–1	#5 Clemson	Chestnut Hill, MA
1:00 p.m. EDT		Report	Mariana Speckmaier 18'	Stadium: Newton Soccer Complex; Attendance: 431; Referee: John Brady; Assistant referees: Sean Regan; John Jordan; Fourth official: Jason Dizek

October 28, 2018	#2 Duke	0–1	#7 Florida State	Durham, NC
1:00 p.m. EDT	Dallas Dorosy (yellow card) 67'	Report	Kristen McFarland 22'	Stadium: Koskinen Stadium; Attendance: 730; Referee: Sergio Gonzalez; Assistant referees: Hudson Owens; John Hieb; Fourth official: Rafael Baptista

October 28, 2018	#3 Virginia	2–1	#6 Louisville	Charlottesville, VA
1:00 p.m. EDT	Alexa Spaanstra 13'; Meghan McCool 72'	Report	Sarah Hernandez 9'; Kennadi Carbin (yellow card) 33'	Stadium: Klöckner Stadium; Attendance: 551; Referee: Mark Gorak; Assistant referees: Florian deVries; Andrew Smith; Fourth official: Mike Renner

=== Semifinals ===
November 2, 2018	#1 North Carolina	1–0	#5 Clemson	Cary, North Carolina
5:30 p.m. EDT	Rachael Dorwart 64'	Report	Kimber Haley (yellow card) 63'; Cyan Mercer (yellow card) 74'; Sam Staab (yellow card) 88'	Stadium: Sahlen's Stadium; Attendance: 2,092; Referee: Sergio Gonzalez; Assistant referees: Will Aten; Brian Odenwald; Fourth official: Trey Krell

November 2, 2018	#3 Virginia	1–3	#7 Florida State	Cary, North Carolina
8:00 p.m. EDT	Zoe Morse 42'; Phoebe McClernon (yellow card) 67'	Report	Deyna Castellanos 49', 65'; Kristen McFarland 81'; Team (yellow card) 35'; Megan Connolly (yellow card) 67'	Stadium: Sahlen's Stadium; Attendance: 2,092; Referee: David Erbacher; Assistant referees: Aaron Gallagher; Hudson Owens; Fourth official: Trey Krell

=== Final ===
November 4, 2018	#1 North Carolina	2–3	#7 Florida State	Cary, North Carolina
12:00 p.m. EST	Alex Kimball 62'; Ru Mucherera 71'	Report	Dallas Dorosy 35', 40'; Jaelin Howell (yellow card) 67'; Kristina Lynch 83'	Stadium: Sahlen's Stadium; Attendance: 2,580; Referee: Trey Krell; Assistant referees: Will Aten; Aaron Gallagher; Fourth official: Derek Ambrozaitis

== Statistics ==
=== Goalscorers ===
2 goals

- Deyna Castellanos – Florida State
- Dallas Dorosy – Florida State
- Alex Kimball – North Carolina
- Kristen McFarland – Florida State

1 goal

- Dorian Bailey – North Carolina
- Rachael Dorwart – North Carolina
- Sarah Hernandez – Louisville
- Kristina Lynch – North Carolina
- Meghan McCool – Virginia
- Zoe Morse – Virginia
- Ru Mucherera – North Carolina
- Alexa Spaanstra – Virginia
- Mariana Speckmaier – Clemson

== All Tournament Team ==
Player	Team
Sam Staab	Clemson
Alexa Spaanstra	Virginia
Brianna Pinto	North Carolina
Taylor Otto	North Carolina
Alex Kimball	North Carolina
Julia Ashley	North Carolina
Deyna Castellanos	Florida State
Jaelin Howell	Florida State
Natalia Kuikka	Florida State
Kristen McFarland	Florida State
Dallas Dorosy (MVP)	Florida State

== See also ==
- Atlantic Coast Conference
- 2018 Atlantic Coast Conference women's soccer season
- 2018 NCAA Division I women's soccer season
- 2018 NCAA Division I Women's Soccer Tournament
