= 2018 Atlantic Coast Conference women's soccer season =

- League: NCAA Division I
- Sport: Soccer
- Duration: August 16, 2018 – December 2, 2018
- Teams: 14

2019 NWSL College Draft
- Top draft pick: Sam Staab
- Picked by: Washington Spirit, 4th overall

Regular season
- Season champions: North Carolina
- Runners-up: Duke
- Season MVP: Offensive: Alessia Russo; Midfielder: Sam Coffey; Defensive: Sam Staab
- Top scorer: Sam Coffey – Boston College

Tournament
- Champions: Florida State
- Runners-up: North Carolina
- Finals MVP: Dallas Dorosy – Florida State

ACC women's soccer seasons
- ← 2017 2019 →

2018 ACC women's soccer standings
	Conf.						Overall
Team	W		L		T	PCT	W		L		T	PCT
No. 2 North Carolina ‍†‍‍^{y}	10	–	0	–	0	1.000	20	–	4	–	2	.808
No. 10 Duke ‍‍‍^{y}	8	–	1	–	1	.850	16	–	4	–	2	.773
No. 11 Virginia ‍‍‍^{y}	7	–	3	–	0	.700	16	–	5	–	1	.750
Boston College ‍‍‍^{y}	6	–	3	–	1	.650	14	–	5	–	1	.725
Louisville ‍‍‍^{y}	6	–	4	–	0	.600	12	–	7	–	0	.632
No. 25 Clemson ‍‍‍^{y}	6	–	4	–	0	.600	12	–	9	–	0	.571
No. 1 Florida State ‍‍‡‍^{y}	5	–	4	–	1	.550	20	–	4	–	3	.796
No. 21 Virginia Tech ‍‍‍^{y}	5	–	5	–	0	.500	11	–	8	–	3	.568
No. 25 Wake Forest ‍‍‍^{y}	4	–	6	–	0	.400	9	–	9	–	2	.500
Notre Dame ‍‍‍	4	–	6	–	0	.400	8	–	10	–	0	.444
No. 22 NC State ‍‍‍^{y}	3	–	5	–	2	.400	11	–	7	–	4	.591
Miami ‍‍‍	3	–	6	–	1	.350	6	–	9	–	3	.417
Pittsburgh ‍‍‍	0	–	10	–	0	.000	4	–	12	–	1	.265
Syracuse ‍‍‍	0	–	10	–	0	.000	3	–	15	–	0	.167
† – Conference champion ‡ – 2018 ACC Tournament champion y – Invited to the NCAA Tournament; As of December 4, 2018; Rankings from United Soccer Coaches Poll; Source: The ACC

The 2018 Atlantic Coast Conference women's soccer season will be the 30th season of women's varsity soccer in the conference.

The Duke Blue Devils the defending regular season champions. The North Carolina Tar Heels are the defending ACC tournament Champions.

== Changes from 2017 ==
Pre-Season

1. Pittsburgh fired their coach Greg Miller on November 3, 2017. On December 19, 2017 Randy Waldrum was announced as his replacement.
2. Miami fired their coach Mary-Frances Monroe on January 15, 2018, after 5 seasons as head coach. On February 27, 2018 Sarah Barnes was announced as the new head coach. Barnes was hired from George Washington University.
3. Notre Dame's coach Theresa Romagnolo resigned on January 22, 2018, citing the desire to spend more time with her family. Assistant coach Nate Norman was promoted to head coach on February 20, 2018.

Post-Season

1. Boston College's coach Allison Foley resigned on December 12, 2018 citing the desire to pursue other opportunities.

== Teams ==
=== Stadiums and locations ===
Team	Stadium	Capacity
Boston College Eagles	Newton Soccer Complex	2,500
Clemson Tigers	Riggs Field	6,500
Duke Blue Devils	Koskinen Stadium	7,000
Florida State Seminoles	Seminole Soccer Complex	1,600
Louisville Cardinals	Lynn Stadium	5,300
Miami Hurricanes	Cobb Stadium	500
NC State Wolfpack	Dail Soccer Stadium	3,000
North Carolina Tar Heels	Fetzer Field	5,025
Notre Dame Fighting Irish	Alumni Stadium	2,500
Pittsburgh Panthers	Ambrose Urbanic Field	735
Syracuse Orange	SU Soccer Stadium	5,000
Virginia Cavaliers	Klöckner Stadium	8,000
Virginia Tech Hokies	Thompson Field	2,500
Wake Forest Demon Deacons	Spry Stadium	3,000

1. Georgia Tech does not sponsor women's soccer

=== Personnel ===
Team	Head coach	Captain
Boston College Eagles	(United States) Alison Foley	Gaby Carreiro; Kayla Jennings
Clemson Tigers	(United States) Eddie Radwanski	Lauren Harkes; Kimber Haley; Sam Staab
Duke Blue Devils	(United States) Robbie Church	
Florida State Seminoles	(United States) Mark Krikorian	Natalia Kuikka
Louisville Cardinals	(United States) Karen Ferguson-Dayes	Gabby Vincent
Miami Hurricanes	(United States) Sarah Barnes	
NC State Wolfpack	(United States) Tim Santoro	
North Carolina Tar Heels	(India) Anson Dorrance	
Notre Dame Fighting Irish	(United States) Nate Norman	
Pittsburgh Panthers	(United States) Randy Waldrum	
Syracuse Orange	(England) Phil Wheddon	
Virginia Cavaiers	(United States) Steve Swanson	Zoe Morse
Virginia Tech Hokies	(United States) Charles Adair	
Wake Forest Demon Deacons	(United States) Tony da Luz	

== Pre-season ==
=== Hermann Trophy Watchlist ===
Prior to the season, seven ACC women's soccer players were named to the MAC Hermann Trophy Watchlist.

- Kayla McCoy, Duke
- Deyna Castellanos, Florida State
- Natalia Kuikka, Florida State
- Emina Ekic, Louisville
- Julia Ashley, North Carolina
- Alessia Russo, North Carolina
- Tziarra King, NC State

=== Pre-season poll ===
The ACC women's soccer pre-season poll was determined by a vote of all 14 ACC women's soccer head coaches. The poll was voted on as teams began their pre-season training during the first week of August. The coaches also voted on a pre-season all-ACC team. Results were released on August 6.

==== Pre-season coaches poll ====
1. North Carolina – 183 (4)
2. Florida State – 174 (5)
3. Virginia – 173 (2)
4. Duke – 151 (3)
5. NC State – 144
6. Clemson – 120
7. Notre Dame – 111
8. Wake Forest – 104
9. Louisville – 75
10. Boston College – 72
11. Virginia Tech – 66
12. Syracuse – 40
13. Miami – 34
14. Pittsburgh – 23

First Place Votes shown in ()

=== Pre-season All-ACC Team ===
Position	Player	Class	School
Goalkeeper	Mandy McGlynn	Junior	Virginia Tech
Defender	Sam Staab	Senior	Clemson
Defender	Natalia Kuikka	Senior	Florida State
Midfielder	Sam Coffey	Sophomore	Boston College
Midfielder	Ella Stevens	Junior	Duke
Midfielder	Emina Ekic	Sophomore	Louisville
Midfielder	Taryn Torres	Sophomore	Virginia
Forward	Kayla McCoy	Senior	Duke
Forward	Deyna Castellanos	Junior	Florida State
Forward	Alessia Russo	Sophomore	North Carolina
Forward	Tziarra King	Junior	NC State

== Regular season ==
=== Conference matrix ===
The table below shows head-to-head results between teams in conference play. Each team plays 10 matches. Each team does not play every other team.

	Boston College	Clemson	Duke	Florida State	Louisville	Miami	North Carolina	NC State	Notre Dame	Pittsburgh	Syracuse	Virginia	Virginia Tech	Wake Forest
vs. Boston College	–	1–2	2–1	1–2	–	1–1 (2OT)	1–0	0–2	–	0–7	0–3	–	0–3	2–1
vs. Clemson	2–1	–	3–2	0–1	–	1–2 (OT)	1–0	–	–	0–2	0–3	0–1 (2OT)	1–3	2–1
vs. Duke	1–2	2–3	–	–	1–2	0–2	–	1–1 (2OT)	0–2	–	0–4	2–1	0–2	2–3
vs. Florida State	2–1	1–0	–	–	–	1–0	1–0	1–1 (2OT)	0–4	0–4	–	0–2	0–3	1–2
vs. Louisville	–	–	2–1	–	–	0–3	5–1	1–2	0–2	0–2	0–1	1–0	1–0	0–2
vs. Miami	1–1 (2OT)	2–1 (OT)	2–0	0–1	3–0	–	2–0	1–0	–	2–3	0–1	–	2–0	–
vs. North Carolina	0–1	0–1	–	0–1	1–5	0–2	–	–	1–2	0–3	1–7	–	0–2	0–1
vs. NC State	2–0	–	1–1 (2OT)	1–1 (2OT)	2–1	0–1	–	–	2–1	0–6	3–6	2–1	–	2–0
vs. Notre Dame	–	–	2–0	4–0	2–0	–	2–1	1–2	–	0–2	1–5	3–0	2–1	0–1
vs. Pittsburgh	7–0	2–0	–	4–0	2–0	3–2	3–0	6–0	2–0	–	–	7–0	2–0	–
vs. Syracuse	3–0	3–0	4–0	–	1–0	1–0	7–1	6–3	5–1	–	–	4–0	–	3–0
vs. Virginia	–	1–0 (2OT)	1–2	2–0	0–1	–	–	1–2	0–3	0–7	0–4	–	1–0	1–5
vs. Virginia Tech	3–0	3–1	2–0	3–0	0–1	0–2	2–0	–	1–2	0–2	–	0–1	–	–
vs. Wake Forest	1–2	1–2	3–2	2–1	2–0	–	1–0	0–2	1–0	–	0–3	5–1	–	–
Total	6–3–1	6–4–0	8–1–1	5–4–1	6–4–0	3–6–1	10–0–0	3–5–2	4–6–0	0–10–0	0–10–0	7–3–0	5–5–0	4–6–0

=== Rankings ===
==== United Soccer ====
Legend
Increase in ranking
Decrease in ranking
Not ranked previous week

	Pre	Wk 1	Wk 2	Wk 3	Wk 4	Wk 5	Wk 6	Wk 7	Wk 8	Wk 9	Wk 10	Wk 11	Wk 12	Final
Boston College					RV	RV	11	11	8	11	19	20	22	RV
Clemson	RV	RV		RV			RV		RV	RV	RV	23	25	RV
Duke	3	11	12	14	13	12	15	17	11	10	5	8	9	10
Florida State	10	6	4	3	2	7	10	10	13	14	9	7	5	1 (34)
Louisville			RV	24	RV	RV	RV	RV		RV	RV	RV		
Miami														
North Carolina	6	4	3	2	6	5	3	3	3	3	3	3	3	2
NC State	20	16	13	13	17	16	21	23	RV	RV	RV	RV	RV	22
Notre Dame	14	20	RV	RV										
Pittsburgh														
Syracuse														
Virginia	8	7	6	6	5	4	6	8	6	6	11	11	12	11
Virginia Tech								RV						21
Wake Forest	RV			RV	RV	RV		RV			RV			25

==== Top Drawer Soccer ====
Legend
Increase in ranking
Decrease in ranking
Not ranked previous week

	Pre	Wk 1	Wk 2	Wk 3	Wk 4	Wk 5	Wk 6	Wk 7	Wk 8	Wk 9	Wk 10	Wk 11	Wk 12	Wk 13	Wk 14	Wk 15	Wk 16	Final
Boston College							RV	14	16	12	14	20	22	25				
Clemson																		
Duke	7	7	11	11	8	8	7	13	14	9	9	6	9	10	10	12	12	12
Florida State	9	9	8	5	3	3	9	15	12	17	18	15	12	4	4	4	3	1
Louisville							RV	25	RV	RV	RV	RV						
Miami																		
North Carolina	3	3	3	3	12	9	8	5	2	2	2	2	2	6	6	5	4	2
NC State	16	16	16	15	18	19	17	24	RV	RV	RV	RV				21	21	21
Notre Dame	19	19	17	25														
Pittsburgh																		
Syracuse																		
Virginia	5	5	5	4	2	2	2	3	8	6	6	9	6	7	7	9	9	9
Virginia Tech															23	23	23	23
Wake Forest	RV	RV			RV	RV	RV	RV										

=== Players of the Week ===
Week	Offensive Player of the week	Defensive of the week
Week 1 - Aug. 21	Maisie Whitsett, Louisville	Julia Ashley, North Carolina
Week 1 - Aug. 21	Maisie Whitsett, Louisville	Mandy McGlynn, Virginia Tech
Week 2 - Aug. 28	Kia Rankin, NC State	Brooke Heinsohn, Duke
Week 3 - Sep. 4	Yujie Zhao, Florida State	Nonie Frishette, Wake Forest
Week 4 - Sep. 11	Rebecca Jarrett, Virginia	Brooke Bollinger, Florida State
Week 4 - Sep. 11	Rebecca Jarrett, Virginia	Brianna Westrup, Virginia
Week 5 - Sep. 18	Rachel Jones, North Carolina	Taylor Otto, North Carolina
Week 6 – Sep. 25	Jenna Bike, Boston College	Alexis Bryant, Boston College
Week 6 – Sep. 25	Mariana Speckmaier, Clemson	Alexis Bryant, Boston College
Week 7 – Oct. 2	Alessia Russo, North Carolina	Mandy McGlynn (2), Virginia Tech
Week 8 - Oct. 9	Sam Coffey, Boston College	Alexis Bryant (2), Boston College
Week 8 - Oct. 9	Sam Coffey, Boston College	Sandy MacIver, Clemson
Week 9 – Oct. 16	Taylor Racioppi, Duke	Sydney Wootten, NC State
Week 10 - Oct. 23	Deyna Castellanos, Florida State	Natalia Kuikka, Florida State
Week 10 - Oct. 23	Deyna Castellanos, Florida State	Brooke Bingham, North Carolina
Week 11 – Oct. 30	Mariana Speckmaier (2), Clemson	Phallon Tullis-Joyce, Miami

== Postseason ==
=== ACC tournament ===
Semifinals
1	North Carolina	1
5	Clemson	0
7	Florida State	3
3	Virginia	1

Final
1	North Carolina	2
7	Florida State	3

=== NCAA tournament ===
An NCAA record 10 ACC teams were selected to the 2018 Women's Soccer Tournament. Additionally, two teams received No. 1 seeds and five total teams were seeded.

Seed	Region	School	1st round	2nd round	3rd round	Quarterfinals	Semifinals	Championship
1	Tallahassee	Florida State	W 1–0 vs. Loyola Chicago – (Tallahassee, FL)	W 3–1 vs. South Florida – (Tallahassee, FL)	T 1–1 (5–4 PKs) vs. USC – (Tallahassee, FL)	W 1–0 vs. Penn State – (Tallahassee, FL)	W 2–0 vs. Stanford – (Cary, NC)	W 1–0 vs. North Carolina – (Cary, NC)
1	Cary	North Carolina	W 4–0 vs. Howard – (Cary, NC)	W 4–1 vs. Kansas – (Cary, NC)	W 3–0 vs. Virginia Tech – (Cary, NC)	T 2–2 (4–2 PKs) vs. UCLA – (Cary, NC)	W 1–0 (OT) vs. Georgetown – (Cary, NC)	L 0–1 vs. Florida State – (Cary, NC)
3	Washington D.C.	Virginia	W 2–0 vs. Monmouth – (Charlottesville, VA)	T 0–0 (4–2 PKs)vs. Texas Tech – (Washington, D.C.)	L 1–2 vs. Baylor – (Waco, Texas)			
4	Stanford	Boston College	L 1–4 vs. Hofstra – (Chestnut Hill, MA)					
4	Washington D.C.	Duke	W 1–0 vs. Rutgers – (Durham, NC)	W 3–0 vs. Lipscomb – (Washington, D.C.)	L 1–4 vs. Georgetown – (Washington, D.C.)			
	Stanford	Clemson	L 1–2 vs. Ole Miss – (Clemson, SC)					
	Stanford	Louisville	L 1–2 vs. Tennessee – (Knoxville, TN)					
	Cary	NC State	W 1–0 vs. Northwestern – (Raleigh, NC)	T 1–1 (5–4 PKs) vs. Santa Clara – (Cary, NC)	L 0–5 vs. UCLA – (Los Angeles, CA)			
	Chapel Hill	Virginia Tech	W 1–0 vs. Texas – (Austin, TX)	W 1–0 vs. Arkansas – (Cary, NC)	L 0–3 vs. North Carolina – (Cary, NC)			
	Tallahassee	Wake Forest	W 1–0 vs. Ohio State – (Winston-Salem, NC)	T 2–2 (6–5 PKs) vs. West Virginia – (Morgantown, WV)	L 0–1 vs. Penn State – (Morgantown, WV)			
		W–L (%):	7–3 (.700)	4–0–3 (.786)	1–5–1 (.214)	1–0–1 (.750)	2–0 (1.000)	1–1 (.500) Total: 16–9–5 (.617)

== Awards and honors ==
=== All-Americans ===
2018 United Soccer Coaches All-Americans
First Team	Second Team	Third Team
Sam Coffey - Midfielder - Boston College; Kayla McCoy - Forward - Duke; Alessia Russo - Forward - North Carolina	Emina Ekic - Midfielder - Louisville; Yujie Zhao - Midfielder - Florida State; Deyna Castellanos - Forward - Florida State	Juila Ashley - Defender - North Carolina; Natalia Kuikka - Defender - Florida State; Sam Staab - Defender - Clemson; Taylor Otto - Midfielder - North Carolina

=== ACC Awards ===
2018 ACC Women's Soccer Individual Awards
Award	Recipient(s)
Offensive Player of the Year	Alessia Russo - North Carolina
Coach of the Year	Anson Dorrance - North Carolina
Defensive Player of the Year	Sam Staab - Clemson
Midfielder of the Year	Sam Coffey - Boston College
Freshman of the Year	Yujie Zhao - Florida State

2018 ACC Women's Soccer All-Conference Teams
First Team	Second Team	Third Team	All-Freshman Team
Sam Coffey, So., M, Boston College; Sam Staab, Sr., D, Clemson; Kayla McCoy, Sr., F, Duke; Deyna Castellanos, Jr., F, Florida State; Yujie Zhao, Fr., M, Florida State; Emina Ekic, So., M, Louisville; Emily Fox, So., D, North Carolina; Taylor Otto, R-So., M, North Carolina; Brianna Pinto, Fr., M, North Carolina; Alessia Russo, So., F, North Carolina; Mandy McGlynn, Jr., GK, Virginia Tech	Mariana Speckmaier, So., F, Clemson; Taylor Racioppi, Sr., F, Duke; Ella Stevens, Jr., M, Duke; Jaelin Howell, Fr., M, Florida State; Natalia Kuikka, Sr., D, Florida State; Phallon Tullis-Joyce, R-Sr., GK, Miami; Julia Ashley, Sr., D, North Carolina; Tziarra King, Jr., F, NC State; Ricci Walkling, Jr., M, NC State; Phoebe McClernon, Jr., D, Virginia; Bayley Feist, Sr., M, Wake Forest	Sandy MacIver, Jr., GK, Clemson; Miranda Weslake, R-Sr., F, Clemson; Malia Berkely, R-So., D, Florida State; Brooklynn Rivers, Jr., F, Louisville; Courtney Petersen, R-Jr., D, Virginia; Dorian Bailey, Sr., M, North Carolina; Karin Muya, Gr., F, Notre Dame; Alexa Spaanstra, Fr., F, Virginia; Taryn Torres, So., M, Virginia; Kelsey Irwin, R-Jr., D, Virginia Tech; Peyton Perea, Sr., M, Wake Forest	Kayla Duran, Fr., D, Boston College; Delaney Graham, Fr., D, Duke; Sydney Simmons, Fr., M, Duke; Jaelin Howell, Fr., M, Florida State; Yujie Zhao, Fr., M, Florida State; Brianna Pinto, Fr., M, North Carolina; Rachel Jones, Fr., F, North Carolina; Rebecca Jarrett, Fr., F, Virginia; Alexa Spaanstra, Fr., F, Virginia; Emily Gray, Fr., M, Virginia Tech; Giovanna DeMarco, Fr, M, Wake Forest

== Draft picks ==
The ACC had 9 players selected in the 2019 NWSL Draft. This was the most selections in the draft from a single conference. The ACC had three players selected in the first round, three in the second round and three in the fourth round.

FW	Forward	MF	Midfielder	DF	Defender	GK	Goalkeeper

Player	Team	Round	Pick #	Position	School
Sam Staab	Washington Spirit	1	4	DF	Clemson
Julia Ashley	Sky Blue FC	1	6	DF	North Carolina
Dorian Bailey	Washington Spirit	1	8	MF	North Carolina
Betsy Brandon	Houston Dash	2	16	MF	Virginia
Bayley Feist	Washington Spirit	2	17	MF	Wake Forest
Kayla McCoy	Houston Dash	2	18	FW	Duke
Alexandra Kimball	Utah Royals FC	4	32	MF	North Carolina
Sabrina Flores	Sky Blue FC	4	34	DF	Notre Dame
Kaycie Tillman	North Carolina Courage	4	36	MF	Florida State
