= 2018 NCAA Division I women's soccer tournament =

2018 NCAA women's soccer tournament
Women's College Cup (semifinals & Final)

Tournament details
- Country: United States
- Dates: November 9 – December 2, 2018
- Teams: 64

Final positions
- Champions: Florida State (2nd title)
- Runners-up: North Carolina
- Semifinalists: Stanford; Georgetown

Tournament statistics
- Matches played: 63
- Goals scored: 190 (3.02 per match)
- Top goal scorer: Dani Rhodes - Wisconsin (5 goals)
- All statistics correct as of 11/8/2018.

The 2018 NCAA Division I women's soccer tournament (also known as the 2018 Women's College Cup) was the 37th annual single-elimination tournament to determine the national champion of NCAA Division I women's collegiate soccer. The semifinals and championship game were played at WakeMed Soccer Park in Cary, North Carolina from November 30 – December 2, 2018 while the preceding rounds were played at various sites across the country during November 2018.

== Qualification ==
All Division I women's soccer programs were eligible to qualify for the tournament. 28 teams received automatic bids by winning their conference tournaments, 3 teams received automatic bids by claiming the conference regular season crown (Ivy League, Pac-12 Conference, and West Coast Conference don't hold conference tournaments), and an additional 33 teams earned at-large bids based on their regular season records.

=== Stanford Bracket ===
Seed	School	Conference	Berth Type	Record	RPI	Appearance	Last bid
1	Stanford	Pac-12	Automatic	17–0–2	1	28th	2017
2	Tennessee	SEC	At-Large	13–2–3	9	12th	2017
3	Texas A&M	SEC	At-Large	15–4–1	10	24th	2017
4	Boston College	ACC	At-Large	14–4–1	10	19th	2015
	Arizona	Pac-12	At-Large	12–5–2	29	6th	2017
	BYU	West Coast	Automatic	13–4–1	42	19th	2016
	Clemson	ACC	At-Large	12–8–0	46	19th	2017
	Denver	Summit League	Automatic	13–5–2	85	11th	2017
	Hofstra	Colonial Athletic	Automatic	15–5–1	63	7th	2017
	Louisville	ACC	At-Large	12–6–0	52	5th	2013
	Memphis	American Athletic	Automatic	17–3–0	14	7th	2016
	North Texas	Conference USA	Automatic	15–2–3	33	6th	2017
	Ole Miss	SEC	At-Large	12–7–1	39	8th	2017
	Seattle	WAC	Automatic	10–7–3	152	4th	2016
	TCU	Big 12	At-Large	12–4–3	19	3rd	2017
	Wisconsin	Big Ten	At-Large	12–3–4	36	20th	2017

=== Georgetown Bracket ===
Seed	School	Conference	Berth Type	Record	RPI	Appearance	Last bid
1	Georgetown	Big East	Automatic	17–0–3	4	9th	2017
2	Baylor	Big 12	At-Large	17–5–0	5	6th	2017
3	Virginia	ACC	At-Large	15–4–0	15	31st	2017
4	Duke	ACC	At-Large	14–3–2	11	24th	2017
	Abilene Christian	Southland	Automatic	15–5–1	67	1st	Never
	Central Connecticut State	Northeast	Automatic	16–1–2	98	8th	2014
	Lipscomb	ASUN	Automatic	14–4–2	76	1st	Never
	Mississippi State	SEC	At-Large	9–6–2	17	1st	Never
	Monmouth	MAAC	Automatic	16–3–1	53	6th	2017
	Montana	Big Sky	Automatic	7–8–6	166	4th	2011
	Murray State	Ohio Valley	Automatic	13–4–1	64	4th	2017
	Princeton	Ivy	Automatic	11–3–2	24	13th	2017
	Rutgers	Big Ten	At-Large	11–3–5	30	13th	2017
	Texas Tech	Big 12	At-Large	13–5–2	34	6th	2016
	Vanderbilt	SEC	At-Large	15–3–1	21	9th	2017
	Washington State	Pac-12	At-Large	12–5–1	32	12th	2017

=== North Carolina Bracket ===
Seed	School	Conference	Berth Type	Record	RPI	Appearance	Last bid
1	North Carolina	ACC	At-Large	17–3–1	3	37th	2017
2	UCLA	Pac-12	At-Large	14–3–1	7	22nd	2017
3	Santa Clara	West Coast	At-Large	16–3–1	12	28th	2017
4	Texas	Big 12	At-Large	13–4–3	13	13th	2017
	Arkansas	SEC	At-Large	13–4–4	26	5th	2017
	Auburn	SEC	At-Large	12–5–2	28	16th	2017
	Howard	SWAC	Automatic	12–6–2	237	2nd	2015
	Kansas	Big 12	At Large	11–5–3	23	8th	2016
	Little Rock	Sun Belt	Automatic	13–4–4	117	1st	Never
	Milwaukee	Horizon	Automatic	16–1–1	89	12th	2013
	Minnesota	Big Ten	Automatic	11–8–2	44	11th	2016
	NC State	ACC	At-Large	10–6–3	20	14th	2017
	Northwestern	Big Ten	At-Large	10–4–4	47	6th	2017
	San Jose State	Mountain West	Automatic	9–6–6	128	3rd	2017
	Saint Louis	Atlantic 10	Automatic	18–3–1	41	3rd	2006
	Virginia Tech	ACC	At-Large	9–7–3	43	10th	2015

=== Florida State Bracket ===
Seed	School	Conference	Berth Type	Record	RPI	Appearance	Last bid
1	Florida State	ACC	Automatic	15–4–2	2	19th	2017
2	West Virginia	Big 12	Automatic	14–4–3	6	19th	2017
3	South Carolina	SEC	At-Large	13–5–1	18	12th	2017
4	USC	Pac-12	At-Large	15–2–2	8	17th	2017
	Albany	America East	Automatic	14–6–2	96	3rd	2016
	Boston	Patriot	Automatic	11–7–3	90	14th	2015
	Bowling Green	Mid-American	Automatic	14–4–3	75	3rd	2005
	LSU	SEC	Automatic	13–6–3	27	6th	2015
	Long Beach State	Big West	Automatic	12–5–3	37	6th	2016
	Loyola (Chicago)	Missouri Valley	Automatic	11–6–1	114	4th	2007
	Ohio State	Big Ten	At-Large	9–5–4	40	13th	2017
	Penn State	Big Ten	At-Large	15–5–1	22	24th	2017
	Radford	Big South	Automatic	16–2–1	59	7th	2012
	UNCG	Southern	Automatic	15–4–1	73	11th	2017
	South Florida	American Athletic	At-Large	14–3–0	16	5th	2017
	Wake Forest	ACC	At-Large	8–8–1	31	20th	2017

== Bracket ==
The bracket was announced on Monday, November 5, 2018

=== Stanford Section ===
First round November 9–10; Campus Sites
1	Stanford*	3
Seattle	0
Clemson*	1
Ole Miss	2
Memphis*	0
Wisconsin	3
Hofstra	4
4	Boston College*	1
3	Texas A&M (a.e.t.)*	1
North Texas	0
TCU*	2
BYU	1
Arizona*	3
Denver	0
Louisville	1
2	Tennessee*	2

Second round November 16; Regional Campus Sites
1	Stanford*	4
Ole Miss	1
Wisconsin*	6
Hofstra	0
3	Texas A&M*	2
TCU	0
Arizona	2
2	Tennessee*	3

Round of 16; November 18; Regional Campus Sites
1	Stanford*	1
Wisconsin	0
3	Texas A&M	0
2	Tennessee*	3

Quarterfinal; November 23; Campus Sites
1	Stanford*	2
2	Tennessee	0

* Host institution

==== Schedule ====
===== First round =====
November 9, 2018	#10 Tennessee	2–1	Louisville	Knoxville, Tennessee
5:00 p.m.	Shaw 74', 85'	Report	Emina Ekic 19'	Stadium: Regal Soccer Stadium; Attendance: 750; Referee: Mark Buda

November 9, 2018	#25 Clemson	1–2	Ole Miss	Clemson, South Carolina
6:00 p.m.	Miranda Weslake 45'	Report	Mary Kate Smith 23'; Grace Johnson 54'	Stadium: Riggs Field; Attendance: 431; Referee: Lance Van Haitsma

November 9, 2018	#22 Boston College	1–4	Hofstra	Chestnut Hill, Massachusetts
7:00 p.m.	Olivia Vaughn 76'	Report	Lucy Porter 24'; Sabrina Bryan 70', 74'; Lucy Shepherd 82'	Stadium: Newton Soccer Complex; Attendance: 222; Referee: Noel Cotterwell

November 9, 2018	#15 Memphis	0–3	#23 Wisconsin	Memphis, Tennessee
8:00 p.m.		Report	Cameron Murtha 26'; Dani Rhodes 55'; Grace Douglas (yellow card) 55'; Maia Cella 61'	Stadium: Mike Rose Soccer Complex; Attendance: 903; Referee: Elvis Mahmutovic

November 9, 2018	#16 Texas A&M	1–0 (a.e.t.)	North Texas	College Station, Texas
8:00 p.m.	Ally Watt (yellow card) 96'; Ally Watt 108'	Report	Dominique James (yellow card) 25'; Carissa Sanders (yellow card) 96'	Stadium: Ellis Field; Attendance: 1,668; Referee: Leszek Stalmach

November 9, 2018	TCU	2–1	#24 BYU	Fort Worth, Texas
8:00 p.m.	Messiah Bright 55'; Yazmeen Ryan 60' (yellow card) 72'	Report	Elise Flake 22'; Rachel Lyman (yellow card) 72'	Stadium: Garvey-Rosenthal Soccer Stadium; Attendance: 972; Referee: Ramon Bermudez

November 9, 2018	Arizona	3–0	Denver	Tucson, Arizona
9:00 p.m.	Kennedy Kieneker 52'; Amanda Porter 57'; Kelcey Cavarra 73' (pen.)	Report		Stadium: Mulcahy Soccer Stadium; Attendance: 1,015; Referee: Randi Hoffman

November 10, 2018	#1 Stanford	3–0	Seattle	Stanford, California
10:00 p.m.	Civana Kuhlmann 17'; Seattle Own Goal 51' (o.g.); Carly Malatskey 89'	Report		Stadium: Laird Q. Cagan Stadium; Attendance: 1,300; Referee: Alex Del Angel

===== Second round =====
November 16, 2018	#16 Texas A&M	2–0	TCU	Knoxville, Tennessee
2:00 p.m.	Ally Watt 51'; Addie McCain 75'	Report		Stadium: Regal Soccer Stadium; Referee: Tori Penso

November 16, 2018	#10 Tennessee	3–2	Arizona	Knoxville, Tennessee
5:00 p.m.	Salera Jordan 34'; Danielle Marcano 45', 89'	Report	Team (yellow card) 20'; Samantha Falasco 77'; Kennedy Kieneker 79'	Stadium: Regal Soccer Stadium; Attendance: 650; Referee: Chris Penso

November 16, 2018	#23 Wisconsin	6–0	Hofstra	Stanford, California
7:35 p.m.	Alexis Tye 1'; Dani Rhodes 22', 53', 68', 69'; Cameron Murtha 55'	Report		Stadium: Laird Q. Cagan Stadium; Attendance: 264; Referee: Turan Ozdemir

November 16, 2018	#1 Stanford	4–1	Ole Miss	Stanford, California
10:05 p.m.	Catarina Macario 12'; Naomi Girma 48', 64'; Civana Kuhlmann 78'	Report	Sophie Dineen 43'	Stadium: Laird Q. Cagan Stadium; Attendance: 421; Referee: Frank Anderson

===== Round of 16 =====
November 18, 2018	#1 Stanford	1–0	#23 Wisconsin	Stanford, California
4:35 p.m.	Jordan DiBiasi 36'; Catarina Macario (yellow card) 86'; Sam Hiatt (yellow card) 88'	Report	Victoria Pickett (yellow card) 8'	Stadium: Laird Q. Cagan Stadium; Attendance: 1,305; Referee: Matthew Buckman

November 18, 2018	#16 Texas A&M	0–3	#10 Tennessee	Knoxville, Tennessee
5:00 p.m.		Report	Danielle Marcano 2', 46' (yellow card) 86'; Salera Jordan 67'	Stadium: Regal Soccer Stadium; Attendance: 718; Referee: Kevin Terry

===== Quarterfinals =====
November 23, 2018	#1 Stanford	2–0	#10 Tennessee	Stanford, California
5:00 p.m.	Civana Kuhlmann 26'; Catarina Macario 58'	Report	M.A. Vignola (yellow card) 35'	Stadium: Laird Q. Cagan Stadium; Attendance: 1,596; Referee: Alex Del Angel

Rankings from United Soccer Coaches Final Regular Season Rankings

=== Georgetown Section ===
First round November 9–10; Campus Sites
1	Georgetown*	3
Central Connecticut State	1
Washington State*	5
Montana	1
Mississippi State*	0
Lipscomb (a.e.t.)	1
Rutgers	0
4	Duke*	1
3	Virginia*	2
Monmouth	0
Texas Tech*	3
Princeton	0
Vanderbilt*	4
Murray State	0
Abilene Christian	0
2	Baylor*	2

Second round November 16; Regional Campus Sites
1	Georgetown*	1
Washington State	0
Lipscomb	0
4	Duke*	3
3	Virginia (p)*	0 (4)
Texas Tech	0 (2)
Vanderbilt	1
2	Baylor*	3

Round of 16; November 18; Regional Campus Sites
1	Georgetown*	4
4	Duke	1
3	Virginia	1
2	Baylor*	2

Quarterfinal; November 24; Campus Sites
1	Georgetown*	3
2	Baylor	0

* Host institution

==== Schedule ====
===== First round =====
November 9, 2018	Mississippi State	0–1 (a.e.t.)	Lipscomb	Starkville, Mississippi
5:00 p.m.	Zakirah McGillivary (yellow card) 108'	Report	Justis Bailey 109'	Stadium: MSU Soccer Field; Attendance: 664; Referee: Matthew Thompson

November 9, 2018	#9 Duke	1–0	Rutgers	Durham, North Carolina
7:00 p.m.	Kayla McCoy 77'; Sydney Simmons (yellow card) 87'	Report	Tiernny Wiltshire (yellow card) 77'	Stadium: Koskinen Stadium; Attendance: 873; Referee: Kevin Broadley

November 9, 2018	#12 Virginia	2–0	Monmouth	Charlottesville, Virginia
7:00 p.m.	Alexa Spaanstra 26', 50'	Report		Stadium: Klöckner Stadium; Attendance: 363; Referee: Bill Dittmar

November 9, 2018	Texas Tech	3–0	#21 Princeton	Lubbock, Texas
7:00 p.m.	Jade King 7'; Kirsten Davis 57'; Charlotte Teeter 65'	Report	Courtney O'Brien (yellow card) 78'	Stadium: John Walker Soccer Complex; Attendance: 552; Referee: Ian Chapman

November 9, 2018	Washington State	5–1	Montana	Pullman, Washington
10:00 p.m.	Brianna Alger 35'; Morgan Weaver 48'; Alysha Overland 60'; Hailey Smith 63' (yellow card) 65'; Gracie Armstrong 82'	Report	Tayrn Miller (yellow card) 65'; Kennedy Yost 84'	Stadium: Lower Soccer Field; Attendance: 754; Referee: Raymond Moffate Jr.

November 10, 2018	#2 Georgetown	3–1	Central Connecticut State	Washington, D.C.
12:00 p.m.	Paula Germino-Watnick 69'; Amanda Carolan 77'; Kyra Carusa 80'	Report	Danielle Pearse 19'; Roma McLoughlin (yellow card) 43' (yellow-red card) 84'; Yo Tachibana (yellow card) 49'	Stadium: Shaw Field; Attendance: 1,098; Referee: Mark Gorak

November 10, 2018	#13 Vanderbilt	4–0	Murray State	Nashville, Tennessee
7:00 p.m.	Haley Hopkins 12'; Grace Jackson 29'; Raegan Kelley 42'; Brook Colangelo 82'	Report	Karsyn Hasch (yellow card) 39'	Stadium: VU Soccer Complex; Attendance: 502; Referee: Andrew Musashe

November 10, 2018	#11 Baylor	2–0	Abilene Christian	Waco, Texas
8:30 p.m.	Sarah King 14'; Camryn Wendlandt 46'; Raegan Padgett (yellow card) 66'	Report		Stadium: Betty Lou Mays Field; Attendance: 1,250; Referee: Timothy Debysingh

===== Second round =====
November 16, 2018	Lipscomb	0–3	#9 Duke	Washington, D.C.
11:00 a.m.		Report	Tess Boade 33'; McCoy 62'; Gabi Brummett 86'	Stadium: Shaw Field; Attendance: 667; Referee: Peter Dhima

November 16, 2018	#2 Georgetown	1–0	Washington State	Washington, D.C.
1:30 p.m.	Meaghan Nally 9'	Report		Stadium: Shaw Field; Attendance: 872; Referee: John Brady

November 16, 2018	#12 Virginia	0–0 (a.e.t.) (4–2 p)	Texas Tech	Waco, Texas
4:00 p.m.		Report	Jade King (yellow card) 98'	Stadium: Betty Lou Mays Field; Attendance: 335; Referee: Michael Lavergne
	Penalties
	Taryn Torres (penalty scored); Ayan Adu (penalty missed); Lizzy Sieracki (penalty scored); Anna Sumpter (penalty scored); Zoe Morse (penalty scored)		Ally Griffin (penalty missed); Demi Koulizakis (penalty missed); Marissa Zucchetto (penalty scored); Carly Wickenheiser (penalty scored)

November 16, 2018	#13 Vanderbilt	1–3	#11 Baylor	Waco, Texas
8:00 p.m.	Haley Hopkins 13'; Madi Allen (yellow card) 79'	Report	Giuliana Cunningham 4'; Reagan Padgett 52'; Julie James 73'	Stadium: Betty Lou Mays Field; Attendance: 1,316; Referee: Travis Haight

===== Round of 16 =====
November 18, 2018	#2 Georgetown	4–1	#9 Duke	Washington, D.C.
11:00 a.m.	Caitlin Farrell 14'; Kyra Carusa 59'; Paula Germino-Watnick 71', 77'	Report	Delaney Graham 54'	Stadium: Shaw Field; Attendance: 1,078; Referee: Ian Gut

November 18, 2018	#12 Virginia	1–2	#11 Baylor	Waco, Texas
8:00 p.m.	Meghan McCool 16'	Report	Julie James 10'; Kennedy Brown 53'	Stadium: Betty Lou Mays Field; Attendance: 1,100; Referee: Nima Saghafi

===== Quarterfinals =====
November 24, 2018	#2 Georgetown	3–0	#11 Baylor	Washington, D.C.
12:00 p.m.	Kelly Ann Livingstone 7'; Kyra Carusa 50'; Paula Germino-Watnick 75'	Report	Julie James (yellow card) 63'	Stadium: Shaw Field; Attendance: 871; Referee: Dimitar Chavdarov

Rankings from United Soccer Coaches Final Regular Season Rankings

=== North Carolina Section ===
First round November 9–10; Campus Sites
1	North Carolina*	4
Howard	0
Kansas (a.e.t.)*	2
Saint Louis	1
Arkansas*	5
Little Rock	1
Virginia Tech	1
4	Texas*	0
3	Santa Clara*	4
Milwaukee	1
NC State*	1
Northwestern	0
Auburn*	0
Minnesota	2
San Jose State	0
2	UCLA*	5

Second round November 16; Regional Campus Sites
1	North Carolina*	4
Kansas	1
Arkansas*	0
Virginia Tech (a.e.t.)	1
3	Santa Clara*	1 (4)
NC State (p)	1 (5)
Minnesota	0
2	UCLA*	5

Round of 16; November 18; Regional Campus Sites
1	North Carolina*	3
Virginia Tech	0
NC State	0
2	UCLA*	5

Quarterfinal; November 24; Campus Sites
1	North Carolina (p)*	2 (4)
2	UCLA	2 (2)

* Host institution

==== Schedule ====
===== First round =====
November 9, 2018	Auburn	0–2	Minnesota	Auburn, Alabama
4:00 p.m.	Taylor Troutman (yellow card) 85'	Report	Emily Peterson 60'; Megan Gray 79'	Stadium: AU Soccer Complex; Attendance: 135; Referee: Guido Gonzales

November 9, 2018	NC State	1–0	Northwestern	Raleigh, North Carolina
7:00 p.m.	Taylor Porter (yellow card) 37'; Jenna Butler 75'; Michaella Van Maanen (yellow card) 83'; Kia Rankin (yellow card) 88'; Ricarda Walking (yellow card) 89'	Report		Stadium: Dail Soccer Field; Attendance: 396; Referee: Patrick Schmidt

November 9, 2018	#17 Texas	0–1	Virginia Tech	Austin, Texas
8:00 p.m.		Report	Bridget Patch 66'	Stadium: Mike A. Myers Stadium; Attendance: 636; Referee: Travis Haight

November 9, 2018	Arkansas	5–1	Little Rock	Fayetteville, Arkansas
8:00 p.m.	Taylor Malham 2'; Kayla McKeon 9'; Tori Cannata 12'; Stefani Doyle 24'; Taylor Runnels 41'	Report	Liesa Seifert 61'	Stadium: Razorback Field; Attendance: 1,123; Referee: Andrew Musashe

November 9, 2018	Kansas	2–1 (a.e.t.)	Saint Louis	Lawrence, Kansas
8:05 p.m.	Katie McClure 18' 103'; Addisyn Merrick (yellow card) 56'	Report	Maddie Pokorny 33'	Stadium: Rock Chalk Park; Attendance: 439; Referee: Luis Tribaldo

November 9, 2018	#4 UCLA	5–0	San Jose State	Los Angeles, California
9:00 p.m.	Jessie Fleming 12'; Ashley Sanchez 17', 31'; Viviana Villacorta 30'; Marley Canales 48'	Report	Karlee Pottoroff (yellow card) 35'; Natasha Harris (yellow card) 85'	Stadium: Wallis Annenberg Stadium; Attendance: 1,509; Referee: Michael Radchuk

November 10, 2018	#3 North Carolina	4–0	Howard	Cary, North Carolina
1:00 p.m.	Julia Ashley 16'; Bridgette Andrzejewski 34', 44'; Rachel Dorwart 72'	Report	Muhammad Zkiya (yellow card) 86'	Stadium: WakeMed Soccer Park; Attendance: 617; Referee: Karl Kummer

November 10, 2018	#7 Santa Clara	4–1	Milwaukee	Santa Clara, California
4:00 p.m.	Maria Sanchez 16', 71'; Delaney Baie Pridham (yellow card) 40'; Kalie Halvorsen 68'; Alex Loera (yellow card) 83'; Natalie Kennedy 85'	Report	Jelena Sever (yellow card) 58' (goal) 61'	Stadium: Stevens Stadium; Attendance: 847; Referee: Matthew Buckman

===== Second round =====
November 16, 2018	Arkansas	0–1 (a.e.t.)	Virginia Tech	Cary, North Carolina
2:00 p.m.	Team (yellow card) 54'	Report	Jordan Hemmen 106'	Stadium: WakeMed Soccer Park; Attendance: 402; Referee: Patrick Schmidt

November 16, 2018	#3 North Carolina	4–1	Kansas	Cary, North Carolina
5:00 p.m.	Brianna Pinto 11'; Annie Kingman 41'; Rachael Dorwart 43', 65'	Report	Katie McClure 81'	Stadium: WakeMed Soccer Park; Attendance: 612; Referee: Kevin Broadley

November 16, 2018	#7 Santa Clara	1–1 (a.e.t.) (4–5 p)	NC State	Los Angeles, California
8:00 p.m.	Maria Sanchez 60'	Report	Tziarra King 77'	Stadium: Wallis Annenberg Stadium; Referee: Ian Anderson
	Penalties
	Maria Sanchez (penalty scored); Julie Doyle (penalty scored); Kelsey Turnbow (penalty scored); Machaela George (penalty scored); Courtney Ogren (penalty missed)		Taylor Porter (penalty scored); Hannah Keogh (penalty scored); Tziarra King (penalty scored); Kristina Schuster (penalty scored); Kursten von Klahr (penalty scored)

November 16, 2018	Minnesota	0–5	#4 UCLA	Los Angeles, California
10:30 p.m.		Report	Chloe Castaneda 3'; Olivia Athens 27'; Hailie Mace 34'; Julia Hernandez 69'; Kennedy Faulknor 85'	Stadium: Wallis Annenberg Stadium; Attendance: 1,209; Referee: Randy Hoffman

===== Round of 16 =====
November 18, 2018	#3 North Carolina	3–0	Virginia Tech	Cary, North Carolina
1:00 p.m.	Alex Kimball 7'; Brianna Pinto 48'; Dorian Bailey 55'	Report		Stadium: WakeMed Soccer Park; Attendance: 632; Referee: Tori Penso

November 18, 2018	NC State	0–5	#4 UCLA	Los Angeles, California
9:00 p.m.		Report	Jessie Fleming 5', 21'; Karina Rodriguez 41'; Chloe Castaneda 82'; Hailie Mace 84'	Stadium: Wallis Annenberg Stadium; Attendance: 1,554; Referee: Frank Anderson

===== Quarterfinals =====
November 24, 2018	#3 North Carolina	2–2 (a.e.t.) (4–2 p)	#4 UCLA	Cary, North Carolina
6:00 p.m.	Julia Ashley 2'; Dorian Bailey 52'; Annie Kingman (yellow card) 56'; Brianna Pinto (yellow card) 69'	Report	Hailie Mace (yellow card) 39' (goal) 56', 57'; Sunny Dunphy (yellow card) 51'	Stadium: WakeMed Soccer Park; Attendance: 904; Referee: Elvis Mahmutovic
	Penalties
	Annie Kingman (penalty scored); Taylor Otto (penalty scored); Rachel Jones (penalty scored); Claudia Dickey (penalty scored)		Hailie Mace (penalty scored); Sunny Dunphy (penalty scored); Julia Hernandez (penalty missed); Jessie Fleming (penalty missed)

Rankings from United Soccer Coaches Final Regular Season Rankings

=== Florida State Section ===
First round November 9–11; Campus Sites
1	Florida State*	1
Loyola (Chicago)	0
South Florida*	5
Albany	1
LSU (p)*	0 (2)
Boston	0 (1)
Long Beach State	0
4	USC*	6
3	South Carolina*	3
UNCG	1
Penn State*	4
Bowling Green	1
Wake Forest (a.e.t.)*	1
Ohio State	0
Radford	0
2	West Virginia*	6

Second round November 16; Regional Campus Sites
1	Florida State*	3
South Florida	1
LSU	0
4	USC*	2
3	South Carolina*	0
Penn State	1
Wake Forest (p)	2 (6)
2	West Virginia*	2 (5)

Round of 16; November 18; Regional Campus Sites
1	Florida State (p)*	1 (5)
4	USC	1 (4)
Penn State*	1
Wake Forest	0

Quarterfinal; November 23; Campus Sites
1	Florida State*	1
Penn State	0

* Host institution

==== Schedule ====
===== First round =====
November 9, 2018	#6 USC	6–0	Long Beach State	Los Angeles, California
4:30 p.m.	Natalie Jacobs 20'; Alea Hyatt 25'; Tara McKeown 53'; Leah Pruitt 62'; Savannah DeMelo 63'; Hailey Hite 80'	Report	Sierra Castles (yellow card) 40'	Stadium: McAlister Field; Attendance: 380; Referee: Christopher Calderon

November 9, 2018	#14 Penn State	4–1	Bowling Green	State College, Pennsylvania
6:00 p.m.	Charlotte Williams 9'; Alina Ortega-Jurado 13'; Marissa Sheva 64'; Emily Ogle 70' (pen.)	Report	Erica Hubert 20'	Stadium: Jeffrey Field; Attendance: 241; Referee: Robert Sheker

November 9, 2018	#18 South Carolina	3–1	UNCG	Columbia, South Carolina
6:00 p.m.	Elexa Bahr 31'; Lauren Chang 50'; Jyllissa Harris 60'	Report	Heida Vidarsdottir 39'	Stadium: Stone Stadium; Attendance: 0 Referee: Eric Usher

November 9, 2018	Wake Forest	1–0 (a.e.t.)	Ohio State	Winston-Salem, North Carolina
7:00 p.m.	Giovanna DeMarco 99'	Report	Izzy Rodriguez (yellow card) 27'	Stadium: Spry Stadium; Attendance: 331; Referee: Lance J. Van Haitsma

November 9, 2018	#5 Florida State	1–0	Loyola (Chicago)	Tallahassee, Florida
7:00 p.m.	Anna Patten 51'	Report	Eleni Carr (yellow card) 43'	Stadium: Seminole Soccer Complex; Attendance: 760; Referee: Jasmine Peralta

November 10, 2018	#8 West Virginia	6–0	Radford	Morgantown, West Virginia
4:00 p.m.	Lauren Segalla 9'; Sh'Nia Gordon 11'; Bianca St-Georges 58' (pen.); Stefany Ferrer-vanGinkel 77'; Patricia Fernandez 83'; Grace Smith 86'	Report		Stadium: Dick Dlesk Soccer Stadium; Attendance: 585; Referee: Lucas Feathers

November 10, 2018	#20 South Florida	5–1	Albany	Tampa, Florida
7:00 p.m.	Aubrey Megrath 25'; Evelyne Viens 32'; Sydny Nasello 52'; Leah Ferlin 72'; Jordan Tuttle 84'	Report	Savanah Courtney 75'	Stadium: Corbett Soccer Stadium; Attendance: 791; Referee: Mary Penso

November 11, 2018	#19 LSU	0–0 (a.e.t.) (2–1 p)	Boston University	Baton Rouge, Louisiana
2:00 p.m.	Molly Thompson (yellow card) 44'	Report		Stadium: LSU Soccer Stadium; Attendance: 1,309; Referee: Matthew Thompson
	Penalties
	Alex Thomas (penalty missed); Adrienne Richardson (penalty missed); Marlena Cutura (penalty missed); Abbey Newton (penalty scored); Lucy Parker (penalty scored)		McKenna Kennedy (penalty scored); Dorrie Varley-Barrett (penalty missed); Kelly Harris (penalty missed); Taylor Kofton (penalty missed); Chelsea Churchill (penalty missed)

===== Second round =====
November 16, 2018	#19 LSU	0–2	#6 USC	Tallahassee, Florida
2:00 p.m.		Report	Savannah DeMelo 36'; Tara McKeown 57'	Stadium: Seminole Soccer Complex; Referee: Lance Jacob Van Haitsma

November 16, 2018	#18 South Carolina	0–1	#14 Penn State	Morgantown, West Virginia
3:00 p.m.	Luciana Zullo (yellow card) 88'	Report	Kristin Schnurr 30'	Stadium: Dick Dlesk Soccer Stadium; Attendance: 100; Referee: Charles Murphy

November 16, 2018	#5 Florida State	3–1	#20 South Florida	Tallahassee, Florida
5:00 p.m.	Dallas Dorosy 40'; Yujie Zhao 62'; Villalobos 86'	Report	Evelyne Viens (yellow card) 24'; Aubrey MeGrath 34'; Kelli Burney (yellow card) 41'	Stadium: Seminole Soccer Complex; Attendance: 1,368; Referee: Guido Gonzales

November 16, 2018	Wake Forest	2–2 (a.e.t.) (6–5 p)	#2 West Virginia	Morgantown, West Virginia
6:00 p.m.	Abby McNamara 29' (yellow card) 93'; Bayley Feist 76'; Kate Ravenna (yellow card) 84'	Report	Jordan Brewster 40'; Hannah Abraham (yellow card) 64'; Team (yellow card) 74'; Bianca St-Georges (yellow card) 81'; Sh'Nia Gordon 88'; Nadya Gill (yellow card) 91'	Stadium: Dick Dlesk Soccer Stadium; Attendance: 313; Referee: Amadou Diop
	Penalties
	Bayley Feist (penalty scored); Estelle Laurier (penalty scored); Olivia Wos (penalty scored); Abby McNamara (penalty missed); Ryanne Brown (penalty scored); Madison Hammond (penalty scored); Hulda Arnarsdottir (penalty scored)		Bianca St. Georges (penalty scored); Stefany Ferrer-vanGinkel (penalty missed); Easther Mayi Kith (penalty scored); Jordan Brewster (penalty scored); Lizzie Mayfield (penalty scored); Mara Rodriguez (penalty scored); Nadya Gill (penalty missed)

===== Round of 16 =====
November 18, 2018	#5 Florida State	1–1 (a.e.t.) (5–4 p)	#6 USC	Tallahassee, Florida
1:00 p.m.	Jaelin Howell (yellow card) 44'; Team (yellow card) 44'; Dallas Dorosy 64'; Megan Connolly (yellow card) 68'	Report	Savannah DeMelo (yellow card) 35'; Penelope Hocking 36'	Stadium: Seminole Soccer Complex; Attendance: 1,479; Referee: Jonathan Weiner
	Penalties
	Anna Patten (penalty scored); Natalia Kuikka (penalty scored); Gabby Carle (penalty scored); Jaelin Howell (penalty scored); Yujie Zhao (penalty scored)		Natalie Jacobs (penalty scored); Ally Prisock (penalty scored); Arlie Jones (penalty scored); Daria Petredes (penalty scored); Leah Pruitt (penalty missed)

November 18, 2018	#14 Penn State	1–0	Wake Forest	Morgantown, West Virginia
3:00 p.m.	Marissa Sheva 13'	Report		Stadium: Dick Dlesk Soccer Stadium; Attendance: 127; Referee: John McCloskey

===== Quarterfinals =====
November 23, 2018	#5 Florida State	1–0	#14 Penn State	Tallahassee, Florida
2:00 p.m.	Deyna Castellanos 52'	Report		Stadium: Seminole Soccer Complex; Attendance: 2,209; Referee: Corey Rockwell

Rankings from United Soccer Coaches Final Regular Season Rankings

=== College Cup ===
Semifinals; November 30; WakeMed Soccer Park; Cary, North Carolina
1	Georgetown	0
1	North Carolina (a.e.t.)*	1
1	Stanford	0
1	Florida State	2

Final; December 2 WakeMed Soccer Park; Cary, North Carolina
1	North Carolina	0
1	Florida State	1

==== Schedule ====
===== Semifinals =====
November 30, 2018	#2 Georgetown	0–1 (a.e.t.)	#3 North Carolina	Cary, North Carolina
5:00 p.m. EST		Report	Julia Ashley 107'	Stadium: WakeMed Soccer Park; Attendance: 10,439; Referee: Tori Penso; Assistant referees: Kristin Patterson; Sarah Cortez; Fourth official: Brandon Marion

November 30, 2018	#1 Stanford	0–2	#5 Florida State	Cary, North Carolina
7:30 p.m. EST	Catarina Macario (yellow card) 82'	Report	Gabby Carle 28'; Malia Berkely 41'	Stadium: WakeMed Soccer Park; Attendance: 10,811; Referee: Becky Pagan; Assistant referees: Jude Carr; Maggie Short; Fourth official: Brandon Marion

===== Final =====
December 2, 2018	#5 Florida State	1–0	#3 North Carolina	Cary, North Carolina
1:00 p.m. EST	Dorosy 59'	Report		Stadium: WakeMed Soccer Park; Attendance: 12,512; Referee: Lance VanHaitsma

Rankings from United Soccer Coaches Final Regular Season Rankings

== Record by conference ==
Conference	Bids	Record	Pct.	R32	R16	QF	SF	F	NC
Big East	1	4–1–0	.800	1	1	1	1	–	–
Pac-12	5	11–3–2	.750	5	3	2	1	–	–
ACC	10	16–9–5	.617	7	7	2	2	2	1
Big 12	6	7–4–2	.615	5	1	1	–	–	–
Big Ten	6	6–6–0	.500	3	2	1	–	–	–
SEC	9	9–9–1	.500	7	2	1	–	–	–
ASUN	1	1–1–0	.500	1	–	–	–	–	–
Colonial	1	1–1–0	.500	1	–	–	–	–	–
WCC	2	1–1–1	.500	1	–	–	–	–	–
American	2	1–2–0	.333	1	–	–	–	–	–

- The R32, S16, E8, F4, CG, and NC columns indicate how many teams from each conference were in the Round of 32 (second round), Round of 16 (third round), Quarterfinals, Semifinals, Final, and National Champion, respectively.
- The following conferences received one bid and finished the tournament with a record of 0–1–0: America East, Atlantic 10, Big Sky, Big West, C-USA, Horizon, Ivy, MAAC, Mid-American, MVC, Mountain West, Northeast, OVC, Patriot, Southern, Southland, SWAC, Summit, Sun Belt, WAC. In the interest of conserving space, these teams are not shown in the table.

== Statistics ==
=== Goalscorers ===
There were 190 goals scored in 63 matches, for an average of 3.02 goals per match.

5 goals

- Dani Rhodes (Wisconsin)

4 goals

- Paula Germino (Georgetown)
- Hailie Mace (UCLA)
- Danielle Marcano (Tennessee)

3 goals

- Julia Ashley (North Carolina)
- Kyra Carusa (Georgetown)
- Dallas Dorosy (Florida State)
- Rachel Dorwart (North Carolina)
- Jessie Fleming (UCLA)
- Civana Kuhlmann (Stanford)
- Katie McClure (Kansas)
- María Sánchez (Santa Clara)

2 goals

- Bridgette Andrzejewski (North Carolina)
- Dorian Bailey (North Carolina)
- Sabrina Bryan (Hofstra)
- Chloe Castenada (UCLA)
- Savannah DeMelo (USC)
- Naomi Girma (Stanford)
- Sh'Nia Gordon (West Virginia)
- Haley Hopkins (Vanderbilt)
- Julie James (Baylor)
- Salera Jordan (Tennessee)
- Kennedy Kieneker (Arizona)
- Catarina Macario (Stanford)
- Kayla McCoy (Duke)
- Tara McKeown (USC)
- Aubrey Megrath (South Florida)
- Cameron Murtha (Wisconsin)
- Brianna Pinto (North Carolina)
- Ashley Sanchez (UCLA)
- Khadija Shaw (Tennessee)
- Marissa Sheva (Penn State)
- Alexa Spaanstra (Virginia)
- Ally Watt (Texas A&M)

1 goal

- Brianna Alger (Washington State)
- Gracie Armstrong (Washington State)
- Olivia Athens (UCLA)
- Elexa Bahr (South Carolina)
- Justis Bailey (Lipscomb)
- Malia Berkely (Florida State)
- Tess Boade (Duke)
- Jordan Brewster (West Virginia)
- Messiah Bright (TCU)
- Kennedy Brown (Baylor)
- Gabi Brummett (Duke)
- Jenna Butler (NC State)
- Marley Canales (UCLA)
- Tori Cannata (Arkansas)
- Gabby Carle (Florida State)
- Amanda Carolan (Georgetown)
- Deyna Castellanos (Florida State)
- Kelcey Cavarra (Arizona)
- Maia Cella (Wisconsin)
- Lauren Chang (South Carolina)
- Brook Colangelo (Vanderbilt)
- Savannah Courtney (Albany)
- Giuliana Cunningham (Baylor)
- Kirsten Davis (Texas Tech)
- Jordan DiBiasi (Stanford)
- Sophie Dineen (Ole Miss)
- Giovanna DeMarco (Wake Forest)
- Stefani Doyle (Arkansas)
- Emina Ekic (Louisville)
- Caitlin Farrell (Georgetown)
- Kennedy Faulknor (UCLA)
- Bayley Feist (Wake Forest)
- Leah Ferlin (South Florida)
- Stefany Ferrer (West Virginia)
- Patricia Fernandez (West Virginia)
- Elise Flake (BYU)
- Delaney Graham (Duke)
- Megan Gray (Minnesota)
- Kalie Halvorsen (Santa Clara)
- Jyllissa Harris (South Carolina)
- Jordan Hemmen (Virginia Tech)
- Julia Hernandez (UCLA)
- Hailey Hite (USC)
- Penelope Hocking (USC)
- Erica Hubert (Bowling Green)
- Alea Hyatt (USC)
- Natalie Jacobs (USC)
- Grace Jackson (Vanderbilt)
- Grace Johnson (Ole Miss)
- Mary Kate Smith (Ole Miss)
- Reagan Kelley (Vanderbilt)
- Natalie Kennedy (Santa Clara)
- Alex Kimball (North Carolina)
- Jade King (Texas Tech)
- Sarah King (Baylor)
- Tziarra King (NC State)
- Annie Kingman (North Carolina)
- Kelly Ann Livingstone (Georgetown)
- Carly Malatskey (Stanford)
- Taylor Malham (Arkansas)
- Addie McCain (Texas A&M)
- Meghan McCool (Virginia)
- Kayla McKeon (Arkansas)
- Abby McNamara (Wake Forest)
- Meaghan Nally (Georgetown)
- Sydny Nasello (South Florida)
- Emily Ogle (Penn State)
- Alina Ortega (Penn State)
- Alysha Overland (Washington State)
- Raegan Padgett (Baylor)
- Bridget Patch (Virginia Tech)
- Anna Patten (Florida State)
- Danielle Pearse (Central Connecticut State)
- Emily Peterson (Minnesota)
- Maddie Pokorny (Saint Louis)
- Amanda Porter (Arizona)
- Lucy Porter (Hofstra)
- Leah Pruitt (USC)
- Karina Rodriguez (UCLA)
- Tyler Runnels (Arkansas)
- Yazmeen Ryan (TCU)
- Kristin Schnurr (Penn State)
- Lauren Segalla (West Virginia)
- Liesa Seifert (UALR)
- Jelena Sever (Milwaukee)
- Lucy Shepherd (Hofstra)
- Grace Smith (West Virginia)
- Hailey Smith (Washington State)
- Bianca St. Georges (West Virginia)
- Charlotte Teeter (Texas Tech)
- Jordan Tuttle (South Florida)
- Alexis Tye (Wisconsin)
- Olivia Vaughn (Boston College)
- Heida Vidarsdottir (UNC Greensboro)
- Evelyne Viens (South Florida)
- Viviana Villacorta (UCLA)
- Gloriana Villalobos (Florida State)
- Morgan Weaver (Washington State)
- Camryn Wendlandt (Baylor)
- Miranda Weslake (Clemson)
- Charlotte Williams (Penn State)
- Kennedy Yost (Montana)
- Yujie Zhao (Florida State)

== All-Tournament team ==
2018 Women's College Cup; All Tournament Team
Player	Team
Jaelin Howell	Florida State
Malia Berkely	Florida State
Gabby Carle	Florida State
Dallas Dorosy	Florida State
Carolina Jeffers	Florida State
Natalia Kuikka	Florida State
Julia Ashley	North Carolina
Emily Fox	North Carolina
Dorian Bailey	North Carolina
Kyra Carusa	Georgetown
Catarina Macario	Stanford

== See also ==
- NCAA Women's Soccer Championships (Division II, Division III)
- NCAA Men's Soccer Championships (Division I, Division II, Division III)
- 2018 NCAA Division I men's soccer tournament
