= 2018 Clemson Tigers women's soccer team =

American college soccer season

2018 Clemson Tigers women's soccer

NCAA Tournament, First Round
- Conference: Atlantic Coast Conference
- U. Soc. Coaches poll: No. RV
- Record: 12–9–0 (6–4–0 ACC)
- Head coach: Eddie Radwanski (8th season)
- Assistant coaches: Jeff Robbins (8th season); Siri Mullinix (8th season)
- Captains: Lauren Harkes; Kimber Haley; Sam Staab
- Home stadium: Riggs Field

2018 ACC women's soccer standings
	Conf.						Overall
Team	W		L		T	PCT	W		L		T	PCT
No. 2 North Carolina ‍†‍‍^{y}	10	–	0	–	0	1.000	20	–	4	–	2	.808
No. 10 Duke ‍‍‍^{y}	8	–	1	–	1	.850	16	–	4	–	2	.773
No. 11 Virginia ‍‍‍^{y}	7	–	3	–	0	.700	16	–	5	–	1	.750
Boston College ‍‍‍^{y}	6	–	3	–	1	.650	14	–	5	–	1	.725
Louisville ‍‍‍^{y}	6	–	4	–	0	.600	12	–	7	–	0	.632
No. 25 Clemson ‍‍‍^{y}	6	–	4	–	0	.600	12	–	9	–	0	.571
No. 1 Florida State ‍‍‡‍^{y}	5	–	4	–	1	.550	20	–	4	–	3	.796
No. 21 Virginia Tech ‍‍‍^{y}	5	–	5	–	0	.500	11	–	8	–	3	.568
No. 25 Wake Forest ‍‍‍^{y}	4	–	6	–	0	.400	9	–	9	–	2	.500
Notre Dame ‍‍‍	4	–	6	–	0	.400	8	–	10	–	0	.444
No. 22 NC State ‍‍‍^{y}	3	–	5	–	2	.400	11	–	7	–	4	.591
Miami ‍‍‍	3	–	6	–	1	.350	6	–	9	–	3	.417
Pittsburgh ‍‍‍	0	–	10	–	0	.000	4	–	12	–	1	.265
Syracuse ‍‍‍	0	–	10	–	0	.000	3	–	15	–	0	.167
† – Conference champion ‡ – 2018 ACC Tournament champion y – Invited to the NCAA Tournament; As of December 4, 2018; Rankings from United Soccer Coaches Poll; Source: The ACC

The 2018 Clemson Tigers women's soccer team represented Clemson University during the 2018 NCAA Division I women's soccer season. The Tigers were led by head coach Ed Radwanski, in his eighth season. Home games were played at Riggs Field. This was the team's 25th season playing organized soccer. All of those seasons were played in the Atlantic Coast Conference.

== Previous season ==
The 2017 Clemson women's soccer team finished the season with a 10–5–3 overall record and a 3–4–3 ACC record. The Tigers failed to make the ACC Tournament, finishing 9th in the conference. The Tigers earned an at-large bid into the 2017 NCAA Division I Women's Soccer Tournament for the fifth season in a row. As an unseeded team in the Duke Bracket, Clemson beat Alabama at home 2–1, but fell in the second round to 4th seeded Texas on penalties.

== Offseason ==
=== Departures ===
Name	Number	Pos.	Height	Year	Hometown	Reason for departure
Shannon Horgan	7	MF	5'5"	Senior	Long Beach, NY	Graduated
Jenni Erickson	18	MF/DF	5'9"	Senior	Greenville	Graduated
Jenna Polonsky	19	MF/FW	5'6"	Graduate Student	Winston–Salem, NC	Graduated

=== Recruiting class ===
Clemson announced its 2018 recruiting class of six players on February 9, 2018.

Name	Nationality	Hometown	Club	TDS Rating
Olivia Bonacorso; FW/MF	USA	Middleton, MA	FC Stars	3/5 stars
Sydney Dawson; MF/DF	USA	Akron, OH	International SC	4/5 stars
Renee Guion; MF/DF	USA	Simpsonville, SC	CESA	3/5 stars
Jackson Moehler; DF	USA	Marietta, GA	Tophat SC	N/A
Brooke Power; MF/FW	USA	Lexington, SC	South Carolina United	2/5 stars
Grace Wagner; MF	USA	Cary, NC	North Carolina Courage	3/5 stars

== Squad ==
=== Roster ===
Updated August 3, 2018

Note: Flags indicate national team as defined under FIFA eligibility rules; some limited exceptions apply. Players may hold more than one non-FIFA nationality.

No.	Pos.	Nation	Player
1	GK	ENG	Sandy MacIver
2	FW	USA	Miranda Weslake
3	FW	USA	Mackenzie Smith
5	DF	USA	Cyan Mercer
6	MF	USA	Lauren Harkes (captain)
7	DF	USA	Sydney Dawson
8	MF	USA	Haley Schueppert
9	MF	USA	Audrey Viso
10	FW	USA	Alana Hockenhull
11	MF	USA	Kimber Haley (captain)
12	DF	USA	Sarah Osborne
13	DF	USA	Dani Antieau
14	DF	USA	Abigail Mitchell

No.	Pos.	Nation	Player
15	DF	USA	Sam Staab (captain)
16	MF	USA	Julie Mackin
17	FW	VEN	Mariana Speckmaier
18	MF	USA	Grace Wagner
19	MF	USA	Renee Guion
20	FW	USA	Courtney Jones
22	MF	USA	Ellen Colborn
24	GK	USA	Maddie Weber
25	FW	USA	Olivia Bonacorso
27	MF	USA	Brooke Power
30	FW	USA	Patrice DiPasquale
33	DF	USA	Jackson Moehler

Prior to the season, Lauren Harkes, Kimber Haley, and Sam Staab were announced as team captains.

== Team management ==
Position	Staff
Athletic director	(United States) Dan Radakovich
Head coach	(United States) Eddie Radwanski
Associate head coach	(United States) Jeff Robbins
Assistant coach	(United States) Siri Mullinix
Director of Operations	(United States) Julie Carson
Assistant Athletic Trainer	(United States) Alora Sullivan

== Schedule ==
Date Time, TV	Rank^{#}	Opponent^{#}	Result	Record	Site City, State
Exhibition
August 8*; 6:00 pm		Auburn	T 2–2	– (–)	Riggs Field; Clemson, SC
August 11*; 7:00 pm		Furman	T 0–0	– (–)	Riggs Field; Clemson, SC
Non-conference regular season
August 17*; 10:00 pm		at Oregon State	W 1–0	1–0–0 (0–0–0)	Paul Lorenz Field at Patrick Wayne Valley Stadium (304); Corvallis, OR
August 19; 9:00 pm		at Oregon	L 0–1	1–1–0 (0–0–0)	Pape Field (494); Eugene, OR
August 23*; 7:00 pm		at No. 10 South Carolina; Rivalry	L 0–1	1–2–0 (0–0–0)	Stone Stadium (6,354); Columbia, SC
August 26*; 1:00 pm		Indiana	W 4–2	2–2–0 (0–0–0)	Riggs Field (603); Clemson, SC
August 31*; 7:00 pm		Villanova	W 1–0	3–2–0 (0–0–0)	Riggs Field (3,118); Clemson, SC
September 2*; 6:00 pm		at Wofford	W 3–0	4–2–0 (0–0–0)	Snyder Field (556); Spartanburg, SC
September 7*; 7:00 pm		West Virginia	L 1–2	4–3–0 (0–0–0)	Riggs Field (675); Clemson, SC
September 9*; 2:00 pm		Liberty	W 5–0	5–3–0 (0–0–0)	Riggs Field (342); Clemson, SC
Conference Regular season
September 14; 12:00 pm		Miami	W 2–1 ^{OT}	6–3–0 (1–0–0)	Riggs Field (302); Clemson, SC
September 20; 7:00 pm		No. 4 Virginia	W 1–0 ^{2OT}	7–3–0 (2–0–0)	Riggs Field (1,021); Clemson, SC
September 23; 1:00 pm		No. 5 North Carolina	L 0–1	7–4–0 (2–1–0)	Riggs Field (571); Clemson, SC
September 30; 1:00 pm		No. 11 Boston College	L 1–2	7–5–0 (2–2–0)	Riggs Field (375); Clemson, SC
October 4; 7:00 pm		at No. 10 Florida State	W 1–0	8–5–0 (3–2–0)	Seminole Soccer Complex (1,971); Tallahassee, FL
October 7; 1:00 pm		at Pittsburgh	W 2–0	9–5–0 (4–2–0)	Ambrose Urbanic Field (398); Pittsburgh, PA
October 13; 5:00 pm		No. 11 Duke	L 2–3	9–6–0 (4–3–0)	Riggs Field (621); Clemson, SC
October 18; 7:00 pm		at Wake Forest	L 1–2	9–7–0 (4–4–0)	Spry Stadium (813); Winston-Salem, NC
October 21; 1:00 pm		at Virginia Tech	W 3–1	10–7–0 (5–4–0)	Thompson Field (327); Blacksburg, VA
October 25; 7:00 pm		at Syracuse	W 3–0	11–7–0 (6–4–0)	SU Soccer Stadium (202); Syracuse, NY
ACC tournament
October 28; 1:00 pm	(5)	at (4) No. 19 Boston College; Quarterfinals	W 1–0	12–7–0	Newton Soccer Complex (431); Chestnut Hill, MA
November 2; 8:00 pm	(5) No. 23	at (1) No. 3 North Carolina; Semifinals	L 0–1	12–8–0	Sahlen's Stadium (2,092); Cary, NC
NCAA tournament
November 10; 6:00 pm	No. 25	Ole Miss; First Round	L 1–2	12–9–0	Riggs Field (431); Clemson, SC
*Non-conference game. ^{#}Rankings from United Soccer Coaches. (#) Tournament seedings in parentheses.

== Goals Record ==
Rank	No.	Nat.	Po.	Name	Regular season	ACC Tournament	NCAA Tournament	Total
1	17	(Venezuela)	FW	Mariana Speckmaier	9	1	0	10
2	2	(United States)	FW	Miranda Westlake	8	0	1	9
3	11	(United States)	MF	Kimber Haley	3	0	0	3
4	10	(United States)	FW	Alana Hockenhull	2	0	0	2
4	13	(United States)	DF	Dani Antieau	2	0	0	2
4	20	(United States)	FW	Courtney Jones	2	0	0	2
6	3	(United States)	FW	Mackenzie Smith	1	0	0	1
6	15	(United States)	DF	Sam Staab	1	0	0	1
6	16	(United States)	MF	Julie Mackin	1	0	0	1
6	27	(United States)	MF	Brooke Power	1	0	0	1
6	33	(United States)	DF	Jackson Moehler	1	0	0	1
Total					31	1	1	33

== Disciplinary record ==
Rank	No.	Nat.	Po.	Name	Regular Season			ACC Tournament			NCAA Tournament			Total		
Rank	No.	Nat.	Po.	Name	Booked	(yellow card) (yellow-red card)	Sent off (straight red)	Booked	(yellow card) (yellow-red card)	Sent off (straight red)	Booked	(yellow card) (yellow-red card)	Sent off (straight red)	Booked	(yellow card) (yellow-red card)	Sent off (straight red)
1	15	(United States)	DF	Sam Staab	2	0	0	1	0	0	0	0	0	3	0	0
2	3	(United States)	FW	Mackenzie Smith	2	0	0	0	0	0	0	0	0	2	0	0
2	5	(United States)	DF	Cyan Mercer	0	0	0	1	0	0	0	0	0	1	0	0
2	9	(United States)	MF	Audrey Viso	1	0	0	0	0	0	0	0	0	1	0	0
2	11	(United States)	MF	Kimber Haley	0	0	0	1	0	0	0	0	0	1	0	0
2	16	(United States)	MF	Julie Mackin	1	0	0	0	0	0	0	0	0	1	0	0
2	25	(United States)	FW	Olivia Bonacorso	1	0	0	0	0	0	0	0	0	1	0	0
Total					7	0	0	3	0	0	0	0	0	10	0	0

== Awards and honors ==
Recipient	Award	Date	Ref.
Sam Staab	Pre-season All-ACC Team	August 6, 2018	
Mariana Speckmaier	ACC Offensive Player of the Week	September 25, 2018	
Sandy MacIver	ACC Defensive Player of the Week	October 9, 2018	
Mariana Speckmaier	ACC Offensive Player of the Week	October 30, 2018	
Sam Staab	ACC Defensive Player of the Year	November 1, 2018	
Sam Staab	All-ACC First Team	November 1, 2018	
Mariana Speckmaier	All-ACC Second Team	November 1, 2018	
Sandy McIver	All-ACC Third Team	November 1, 2018	
Miranda Westlake	All-ACC Third Team	November 1, 2018	

== Rankings ==
Ranking movement Legend: ██ Improvement in ranking. ██ Decrease in ranking. ██ Not ranked the previous week. RV=Others receiving votes.
Poll	Pre	Wk 1	Wk 2	Wk 3	Wk 4	Wk 5	Wk 6	Wk 7	Wk 8	Wk 9	Wk 10	Wk 11	Wk 12	Wk 13	Wk 14	Wk 15	Final
United Soccer	RV	RV		RV			RV		RV	RV	RV	23	25	None Released			RV
TopDrawer Soccer																	

== 2019 NWSL Draft ==
The Tigers had one player drafted in the 2019 draft, Sam Staab, was taken as the 4th pick. This is the highest any Clemson player has been picked in an NWSL draft.

Player	Team	Round	Pick #	Position
(United States) Sam Staab	Washington Spirit	1st	4	DF
