= Ruvimbo Mucherera =

Zimbabwean soccer player (born 1996)

Ru Mucherera
Personal information
- Full name: Ruvimbo Tracy Elizabeth Mucherera
- Date of birth: October 5, 1996 (age 30)
- Place of birth: Denver, Colorado, United States
- Height: 5 ft 4 in (1.63 m)
- Position: Forward

College career
Years	Team	Apps	(Gls)
2015–2019	North Carolina Tar Heels	84	(8)

Senior career*
Years	Team	Apps	(Gls)
2020	Gintra	10	(7)
2021	Kuopion Palloseura	0	(0)
2023	Shelbourne	6	(0)
2024	Maccabi Kishronot Hadera		
2025	Stomilanki Olsztyn	8	(1)

International career^{‡}
2025–	Zimbabwe	2	(1)
- * Club domestic league appearances and goals as of May 25, 2025 ‡ National team caps and goals as of February 26, 2025

Ruvimbo Tracy Elizabeth Mucherera (born October 5, 1996) is a professional soccer player who plays as a forward. Born in the United States, she plays for the Zimbabwe national team. She played college soccer for the North Carolina Tar Heels. She has also previously played for clubs in Ireland, Israel, Lithuania, and Poland.

== Early life ==
Mucherera was born in Denver, Colorado, one of four children born to Tapiwa and Bertha Mucherera. Both parents are PhD holders who emigrated from Zimbabwe. After moving to Lexington, Kentucky, Mucherera began playing soccer on a boys' team when she was four. She also played other sports growing up, including basketball, football, and golf. While living in Oviedo, Florida, she played for Elite Clubs National League clubs Orlando City and Florida Kraze Krush. She attended Paul J. Hagerty High School in Oviedo, where she set the career scoring record with 94 goals. She led the team to three district titles and one regional title and earned first-team all-conference honors all four years. She committed to North Carolina over finalists Florida and Wake Forest.

== College career ==
After an injury-tested freshman year, Mucherera scored her first college goals against Wake Forest and Pittsburgh during her sophomore season in 2016, also taking a trip to the NCAA tournament semifinals. She received a medical redshirt the following year after sustaining an anterior cruciate ligament injury in practice early in the season and went through recovery alongside Emily Fox. In her redshirt junior year in 2018, Mucherera scored her only goal of the season in the ACC tournament final, equalizing in the eventual loss to Florida State. She had an assist against Kansas in the NCAA tournament second round and helped the Tar Heels advance to the final, playing 40 minutes in the loss to Florida State.

Mucherera recorded career highs with five goals and seven assists in her redshirt senior season in 2019. Her six goal contributions during conference play, including goals against Wake Forest and Florida State, helped the Tar Heels to the ACC regular-season title. In the ACC tournament, she scored in the quarterfinals against Notre Dame on the way to the conference double. In the NCAA tournament, she scored in the first round against Belmont and assisted in the semifinals against Washington State, helping the Tar Heels to their second consecutive final. She played 38 minutes in the shootout loss to Stanford. Primarily a substitute during her college years, she scored 8 goals in 84 career games. Her teammate Bridgette Andrzejewski said of her: "When the game-changers come in, Ru sets a bar. Ru is not coming in quietly and doing it, she's coming in loudly, in a great way".

== Club career ==
After going unselected in the 2020 NWSL College Draft, Mucherera trained with Umeå IK but was limited by injury during her trial with the Swedish club. She instead began her professional career with Lithuanian club Gintra, scoring her first goal during a 2–2 Baltic League draw against Flora. Her first A Lyga goal came days later in an 8–1 win against FK Banga on August 30, 2020. Gintra finished the season as undefeated league champions, with Mucherera scoring 7 of the 84 goals that Gintra scored in the 10 league games she played. On November 4, she made her UEFA Women's Champions League debut in the first qualifying round, scoring the third goal of Gintra's 4–0 win against Slovan Bratislava. She was the first Zimbabwean to play in the UEFA Women's Champions League. Vålerenga knocked Gintra out of the competition in the second qualifying round.

In December 2020, Finnish club KuPS announced that the club had signed Mucherera for the 2021 season, but she never made an appearance. Mucherera trained with National Women's Soccer League (NWSL) expansion team San Diego Wave in the 2022 preseason.

Mucherera signed with Irish club Shelbourne for the 2023 season, appearing in six league games and scoring zero goals for the league runners-up.

After training with NWSL expansion team Bay FC in the 2024 preseason, Mucherera joined Israeli club Maccabi Kishronot Hadera. She scored a goal on her debut, a 3–2 loss to Hapoel Petah Tikva on September 12, 2024.

Polish club Stomilanki Olsztyn announced on March 6, 2025, that Mucherera had signed with the club. On March 15, she was sent off from her second Ekstraliga game after receiving two yellow cards. The following week, she scored her first and only goal for Olsztyn in a 2–1 defeat to Pogoń Szczecin. On April 27, she set up the opening goal against Pogoń Tczew as Olsztyn won 2–1, snapping a five-game losing streak and almost assuredly staving off relegation with three games left in the season.

== International career ==
Born in the United States to Zimbabwean parents, Mucherera attended local identification camps for the United States youth national team in 2012 and 2013.

Mucherera obtained her Zimbabwean passport in 2024, making her available for selection to the Zimbabwe national team. The following February, she received her first international call-up for Zimbabwe's 2026 Women's Africa Cup of Nations qualification games. She scored a goal on her international debut, a 2–1 loss to Angola in the first qualification round first leg on February 20, 2025. Six days later, although the Mighty Warriors leveled the tie in regulation, they were eliminated from the qualification tournament on penalties.

== Honors ==
North Carolina Tar Heels

- NCAA tournament runner-up: 2018, 2019
- Atlantic Coast Conference: 2018, 2019; runner-up: 2017
- ACC tournament: 2017, 2019; runner-up: 2016, 2018

Gintra

- A Lyga: 2020

Shelbourne

- League of Ireland Women's Premier Division runner-up: 2023
