= Virginia Tech Hokies soccer =

There are two Virginia Tech Hokies soccer teams:

- Virginia Tech Hokies men's soccer
- Virginia Tech Hokies women's soccer
