= Alexandra Kimball =

Peruvian-American soccer player (born 1995)

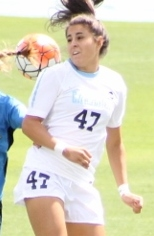
- Kimball with North Carolina in 2015

Personal information
- Full name: Alexandra Amalia Kimball-Suarez
- Date of birth: September 21, 1995 (age 31)
- Place of birth: Salt Lake City, Utah, United States
- Height: 5 ft 7 in (1.70 m)
- Positions: Midfielder; striker

College career
Years	Team	Apps	(Gls)
2014–2018	North Carolina Tar Heels	91	(9)

Senior career*
Years	Team	Apps	(Gls)
2016	FC Austin Elite		
2018	Real Salt Lake Women		
2019	Utah Royals	0	(0)
2022	North Carolina Courage U23	1	(0)

International career^{‡}
2022	Peru	8	(0)

Managerial career
- 2023: North Carolina Tar Heels (assistant)
- 2025–: Utah United (assistant)
- * Club domestic league appearances and goals ‡ National team caps and goals as of November 14, 2022

Alexandra Amalia Kimball-Suarez (born September 21, 1995) is a Peruvian-American soccer coach and former player who is an assistant coach for USL W League club Utah United. She played college soccer for the North Carolina Tar Heels and was drafted by the Utah Royals in the fourth round of the 2019 NWSL College Draft. Born and raised in the United States, she made eight appearances for the Peru national team.

== Early life ==
Kimball was born in Salt Lake City, Utah, to Melissa Suarez and Steven Kimball, the oldest of four children. She is of Peruvian descent on her mother's side. She began playing soccer at age two or three. After her family moved to Chapel Hill, North Carolina, when she was eight, she aspired to play for the North Carolina Tar Heels. She played club soccer for Triangle United and the Capital Area Soccer League. She attended Chapel Hill High School, where she led the soccer team to its first state championship in 2014, being named the most valuable player of the state final and the News & Observer player of the year.

== College career ==
Before her junior season with the North Carolina Tar Heels in 2016, Kimball underwent surgery for a hip labral tear before returning to the field and helping the team to the NCAA tournament semifinals. She redshirted the entire 2017 season due to hip issues. Toward the end of her redshirt senior season in 2018, Kimball was thrust into a starting role after star center forward Alessia Russo broke her leg. In her first start since 2015, Kimball opened scoring against Virginia Tech in the ACC tournament quarterfinals. She had a second tournament goal in the final loss to Florida State and was named to the ACC all-tournament team. In the NCAA tournament, she scored her career-high fourth goal of the season against Virginia Tech and went on to help the team to the national final, although the team again lost to Florida State. In four seasons at North Carolina, she scored 9 goals and provided 7 assists in 91 appearances.

== Club career ==
While in college, Kimball played during the summer for United Women's Soccer clubs FC Austin Elite and Real Salt Lake Women. She trained with Utah Royals FC as a non-roster player in 2018.

After college, Kimball was drafted by the Royals with the 32nd overall pick in the fourth round of the 2019 NWSL College Draft. She was signed as a national team replacement player for Becky Sauerbrunn during the 2019 FIFA Women's World Cup.

Kimball sustained an anterior cruciate ligament injury while training with Racing Louisville FC as a non-roster player in the 2021 preseason.

Kimball made one appearance for the North Carolina Courage U23 during the 2022 USL W League season.

Kimball represented the US Women team, composed primarily of youth and former national team players, at the Soccer Tournament beginning in 2023. She won the US$1 million prize with the team in 2024 and 2025.

Kimball played for Pan World Elite WFC at the 2024 National Amateur Cup, scoring four goals en route to winning the women's title.

== International career ==
Kimball made her senior international debut for Peru in a friendly game against Mexico on June 25, 2022. She was selected to the Peruvian roster for the 2022 Copa América Femenina, where she started the first two matches of the group stage.

== Coaching career ==
While injured in 2019, Kimball began working in sports facilities in Salt Lake City. In 2021, she joined the Utah Avalanche youth soccer club and was an assistant coach at Bonneville High School. She also organized an online six-week training course for teenage girls' soccer players that year.

In 2022, following a spell as a volunteer assistant coach, Kimball was hired by her alma mater North Carolina Tar Heels as the director of team development, working in community outreach and recruiting. In August 2023, she was promoted to an assistant coach, before leaving in November of that year. The Assembly reported that the university had investigated Kimball for an alleged relationship with one of her players.

In 2025, Kimball became an assistant coach for USL W League expansion club Utah United, winning the national championship in their debut season.
