= Ella Bard =

American soccer player (born 2007)

Personal information
- Full name: Ella Jett Bard
- Date of birth: March 21, 2007 (age 19)
- Height: 5 ft 9 in (1.75 m)
- Position: Center back

Team information
- Current team: Louisville Cardinals
- Number: 21

Youth career
- WASA
- Internationals SC

College career
Years	Team	Apps	(Gls)
2025–	Louisville Cardinals	19	(1)

International career^{‡}
2025–2026	United States U-19	4	(0)
2026–	United States U-20	10	(0)
- ‡ National team caps and goals as of September 16, 2026

Ella Jett Bard (born March 21, 2007) is an American college soccer player who plays as a center back for the Louisville Cardinals.

== Early life ==
Bard grew up in Wadsworth, Ohio. Her mother, Debbie, helped Wadsworth High School win the high school state basketball title in 1997. Bard began playing soccer with the Wadsworth Amateur Soccer Association before moving to Internationals SC. She earned multiple ECNL all-conference honors with the latter. She was homeschooled and committed to play college soccer for the Louisville Cardinals.

== College career ==
Bard made 16 appearances, starting 7, for the Louisville Cardinals as a freshman in 2025. She helped the Cardinals earn their first NCAA tournament berth since 2019, reaching the third round.

== International career ==
Bard made her international debut for the United States under-19 team in 2025. She was named to the under-20 roster for the 2026 FIFA U-20 Women's World Cup. She played every minute at the tournament alongside defender Lizzie Boamah and goalkeeper Caroline Birkel, losing on penalties to Brazil in the round of 16.
