= Brianna Alger =

American soccer player

Personal information
- Full name: Brianna Nicole Alger
- Date of birth: September 24, 1998 (age 28)
- Place of birth: Monument, Colorado, U.S.
- Height: 5 ft 9 in (1.75 m)
- Position: Left back

Youth career
- Pride SC

College career
Years	Team	Apps	(Gls)
2017–2021	Washington State Cougars	86	(5)

Brianna Nicole Alger (born September 24 1998) is an American former soccer player who played as a left back. She played college soccer for the Washington State Cougars and was selected by the Chicago Red Stars in the third round of the 2021 NWSL Draft.

== Early life ==
Alger was born and raised in Monument, Colorado. Both of her parents were members of the Ohlone College swim and dive team. She has five siblings, three of whom were collegiate swimmers, and the other two having played youth club soccer. Alger attended Lewis-Palmer High School, where she was a four-time conference Player of the Year for the soccer team. She registered 93 goals and 38 assists across 73 high school matches. She led the team to a 2016 Colorado state championship after having lost in the title match the previous year. In both 2016 and 2017, she was named the The Gazette's Girls Soccer Peak Performer of the Year. Alger played soccer outside of school for Pride SC. She contributed to four consecutive state club championships and a bronze-medal finish at the 2014 US Youth Soccer National Championships.

== College career ==
As a freshman with the Washington State Cougars in 2017, Alger started in 12 of her 22 appearances. The following year, she scored a career-high 3 goals, including one against Montana in the first round of the NCAA tournament. Alger was converted from a forward to a left back ahead of her junior season. She went on to start in all 24 of the Cougars' matches in 2019, leading her team in minutes among all field players. Her performances earned her recognition on the All-Pac-12 Conference and All-Pacific Region third teams, as well as two Pac-12 Defensive Player of the Week honors. She became the third player in Washington State history to record double-digit assists in a single season, with her assist count also topping the Pac-12. In October 2019, Alger went viral after a clip of her faking out an opponent in a match against Arizona State garnered media attention from platforms including Good Morning America, SportsCenter, NBC Sports, and ESPN.

After being selected by the Chicago Red Stars in the 2021 NWSL Draft, Alger opted to return to Washington State to gain another year of experience playing on the backline. Forty minutes into the opening match of the 2021 spring season, Alger suffered a torn ACL that sidelined her for the remainder of the campaign. She spent 206 days off the field before returning to active play in the fall portion of 2021. In her first start since her injury, she tallied an assist to help Washington State beat Kansas, 3–0. Alger went on to total 14 assists across her collegiate career, ranking 8th in Washington State program history.

== Club career ==
The Chicago Red Stars drafted Alger in the third round of the 2021 NWSL Draft (25th overall). Her selection marked the third consecutive year in which a native of the Colorado Springs area was drafted into the NWSL. Alger, alongside fellow Washington State draftee Makamae Gomera-Stevens, chose to return to WSU and exercise the extra year of NCAA eligibility offered to athletes due to the COVID-19 pandemic.

Alger reported to the Red Stars' 2022 preseason training camp following the conclusion of her college career. However, she did not make the team's final roster.

== Honors and awards ==
Individual

- Third-team All-Pac-12: 2019
