= Jerry Cheynet =

Coordinator of soccer operations

Current position
- Title: Coordinator Soccer Operations
- Team: Virginia Tech Hokies
- Conference: Atlantic 10 Conference

Biographical details
- Education: Kansas State University

Head coaching record
- Overall: 238-212-37

Jerry Cheynet is the coordinator of soccer operations at Virginia Tech.

From 1974 to 2001, he was Virginia Tech's head soccer coach. He took over the program in its third year of existence, and compiled a 238-212-37 record overall. His win total remains, by far, the most of any Hokies soccer coach. He was named Atlantic 10 Conference coach of the year in 1997, when he led the team to a 14-5-1 record.

He also served as the school's wrestling coach from 1975 to 1995, posting a record of 188-161-6. He was named Colonial Athletic Association coach of the year in 1993. He also served as the school's head golf coach from 1980 to 1983. He is a graduate of Kansas State University.
