= Zoe Morse =

American professional soccer player (born 1998)

Personal information
- Full name: Zoe Anne Morse
- Date of birth: April 1, 1998 (age 28)
- Place of birth: East Lansing, Michigan
- Height: 5 ft 9 in (1.75 m)
- Position: Defender

College career
Years	Team	Apps	(Gls)
2016–2019	Virginia Cavaliers		

Senior career*
Years	Team	Apps	(Gls)
2020–2023	Chicago Red Stars	23	(0)
2023	Brighton & Hove Albion	14	(0)

International career
2017–2018	United States U-20		
- * Club domestic league appearances and goals as of 14 September 2023

Zoe Anne Morse (born April 1, 1998) is an American former professional soccer player who last played as a defender for Brighton & Hove Albion in the Women's Super League. Morse has represented the United States on the under-17, under-18, and under-20 national teams. She played collegiate soccer at the University of Virginia.

== Early life ==
Morse grew up in East Lansing, Michigan, where she attended East Lansing High School. She also played club soccer for the Michigan Hawks.

=== Virginia Cavaliers, 2016–2019 ===
Morse attended the University of Virginia, and played for the Cavaliers from 2016 to 2019. During the 2016 season, she started in all 21 games in which she played, scored two goals, and was selected for the All-ACC Freshman team. The following season, she competed in 22 matches, drawing the start in 21, tallied one assist, and was named to the ACC Women's Soccer All-Academic Team. In 2018 Morse played in 20 games, all of which she started, scored one goal, and was named to the ACC Women's Soccer All-Academic Team for the second time. Morse served as a co-captain of the Cavaliers alongside fellow senior Meghan McCool during the 2019 season, starting all 22 games, playing a team-leading 1,923 minutes on the back line, helping the team post 14 shutouts on the season, including 7 consecutive shutouts in ACC play, scoring the opening goal against the Florida State Seminoles women's soccer team in the semifinal game of the 2019 ACC Women's Soccer Tournament, and being selected for both the All-Region Second Team selection by United Soccer Coaches and the ACC Championship All-Tournament Team. On January 16, 2020, Morse was selected as the 19th overall pick in the 2020 NWSL College Draft by the Chicago Red Stars.

== Club career ==
=== Chicago Red Stars ===
Morse made her debut in the 2020 NWSL Challenge Cup on June 27, 2020, drawing the start and playing the full 90 minutes in her first professional league game.

=== Brighton & Hove Albion ===
In 2023, she signed for Brighton & Hove Albion on a one-and-a-half-year contract.
On 14 September 2023 it was announced that Morse had retired from professional football.
