= Kayla McKenna =

Jamaican footballer (born 1996)

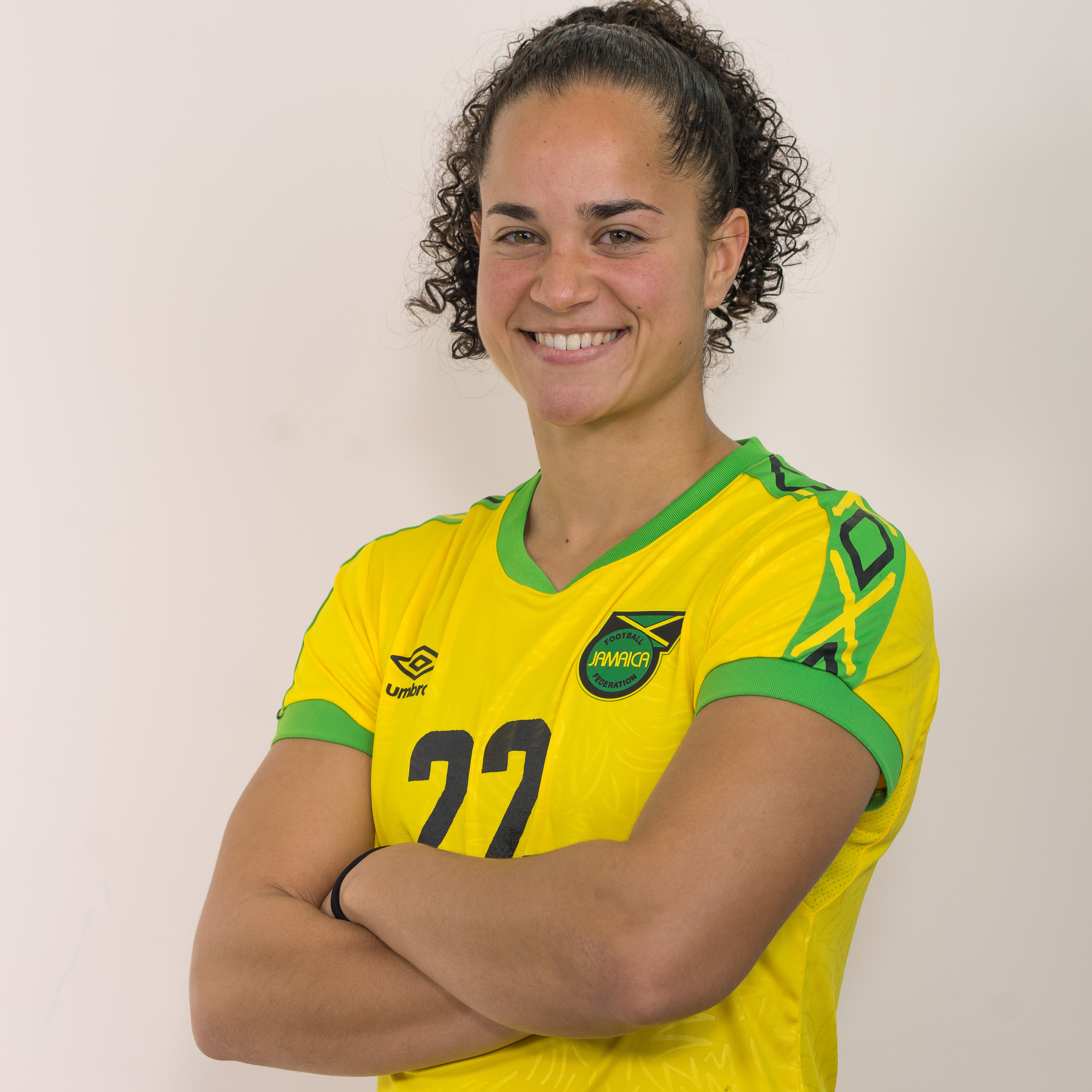
- McKenna with Jamaica in 2019

Personal information
- Full name: Kayla Jay McKenna
- Birth name: Kayla Jay McCoy
- Date of birth: 3 September 1996 (age 30)
- Place of birth: Skokie, Illinois, U.S.
- Height: 1.70 m (5 ft 7 in)
- Position: Forward

Team information
- Current team: Grasshopper Club Zurich
- Number: 12

Youth career
- Eclipse Select
- Sockers FC Chicago

College career
Years	Team	Apps	(Gls)
2015–2018	Duke Blue Devils	82	(38)

Senior career*
Years	Team	Apps	(Gls)
2019–2020	Houston Dash	1	(0)
2021–2023	Rangers	40	(25)
2023–2024	Villarreal	30	(11)
2024–2025	Madrid CFF	14	(4)
2025–	Grasshopper Club Zurich	33	(15)

International career^{‡}
2018	United States U23	3	(0)
2019–	Jamaica	21	(5)
Medal record
Women's football
Representing Jamaica
CONCACAF W Championship
Third place	2022 Mexico
- * Club domestic league appearances and goals as of 6 December 2023 ‡ National team caps and goals as of 2 April 2026

Kayla Jay McKenna (née McCoy; born 3 September 1996) is a professional footballer who plays as a forward for Swiss Women's Super League club Grasshopper Club Zurich. Born in the United States, she plays for the Jamaica women's national team.

== Club career ==
=== Houston Dash ===
In April 2019, McCoy signed with the Houston Dash ahead of the 2019 season.

=== Rangers ===
In May 2021, McCoy started training with Rangers, leading to her signing with the club three months later.

=== Villarreal ===
In July 2023, McKenna signed with Villarreal in Spain.

== International career ==
McCoy made her debut for Jamaica in a 1–0 friendly win against Chile on 28 February 2019. She was named to the 23-player Jamaica squad for the 2019 FIFA Women's World Cup in France. However, because of a knee injury prior the tournament, she had to be replaced by Mireya Grey.

== Personal life ==
McCoy's grandparents were born in Jamaica. Her grandfather is Pearnel Charles. In June 2022, Kayla McCoy married Ciaran McKenna in Oak Park, Illinois, USA.

== Career statistics ==
=== International goals ===
Scores and results list Jamaica's goal tally first

No.	Date	Venue	Opponent	Score	Result	Competition
1	4 February 2020	H-E-B Park, Edinburg, United States	Saint Kitts and Nevis	6–0	7–0	2020 CONCACAF Women's Olympic Qualifying Championship
2	4 February 2020	H-E-B Park, Edinburg, United States	Saint Kitts and Nevis	7–0	7–0	2020 CONCACAF Women's Olympic Qualifying Championship
3	9 April 2022	Truman Bodden Stadium, George Town, Cayman Islands	Cayman Islands	9–0	9–0	2022 CONCACAF W Championship qualification
4	2 December 2024	Catherine Hall Sports Complex, Montego Bay, Jamaica	South Africa	3–1	3–2	Friendly
5	23 February 2025	Estadio Alberto Gallardo, Lima, Peru	Peru	2–0	2–0	Friendly

== Honours ==
Houston Dash

- NWSL Challenge Cup: 2020

Rangers

- Scottish Women's Premier League: 2021–22
- Scottish Women's Premier League Cup: 2022
- City of Glasgow Woman's Cup: 2022
