= Sam Staab =

American soccer player (born 1997)

- Staab with the Chicago Red Stars in 2026

Personal information
- Full name: Samantha Keala Staab
- Date of birth: March 28, 1997 (age 29)
- Place of birth: San Diego, California, United States
- Height: 5 ft 7 in (1.70 m)
- Position: Center back

Team information
- Current team: Chicago Stars
- Number: 3

Youth career
- DMCV Sharks

College career
Years	Team	Apps	(Gls)
2015–2018	Clemson Tigers	80	(5)

Senior career*
Years	Team	Apps	(Gls)
2019–2023	Washington Spirit	93	(4)
2019–2020	→ Western Sydney Wanderers (loan)	12	(2)
2024–	Chicago Stars	72	(5)

International career^{‡}
2018	United States U23	2	(0)
2024–	United States	2	(0)
- * Club domestic league appearances and goals as of 05:33, November 2, 2026 (UTC) ‡ National team caps and goals as of 03:37, November 4, 2025 (UTC)

Samantha Keala Staab (born March 28, 1997) is an American professional soccer player who plays as a center back for Chicago Stars FC of the National Women's Soccer League (NWSL). She was drafted by the Washington Spirit in 2019 after playing collegiately for the Clemson Tigers. Staab debuted for the United States national team in 2024.

== Early life ==
Staab was raised in San Diego, California. She is part Hawaiian through one grandmother. She played club soccer for the DMCV Sharks in her childhood. She attended Scripps Ranch High School, where she played varsity soccer all four years and captained the team in her last two years.

== College career ==
Staab attended Clemson University, where she played for the Tigers women's soccer team from 2015 to 2018. She was selected for the ACC All-Freshman team in 2015 after starting all 20 games in her first season. After making the All-ACC second team in each of the next two years, she was selected to the All-ACC first team in her senior season. At the time of her graduation, her 33 career assists were tied for 4th-most in school history.

== Club career ==
=== Washington Spirit ===
Staab was drafted 4th overall in the first round of the 2019 NWSL College Draft by the Washington Spirit. In April, she was signed to the Spirit's senior roster in advance of the 2019 NWSL season. Staab made her professional debut on April 13, 2019, against Sky Blue FC, scoring a 59th-minute goal en route to a 2–0 season-opening win for the Spirit. Staab went on to appear in every minute of the Spirit's season, becoming the second-ever NWSL player to play every minute of her rookie season. She was considered one of the league's top defenders, earning a spot on the NWSL Team of the Month for May and June, and was one of three nominees for NWSL Rookie of the Year.

Staab was signed in advance of the 2019–20 W-League season by the Western Sydney Wanderers. She made her debut for the Wanderers on November 14, 2019.

In 2020, Staab played every minute of the Spirit's season. In the NWSL Challenge Cup, she converted a header off a set piece in the 77th minute against the Portland Thorns, scoring the Spirit's lone goal in the team's 1–1 tie. In 2022, Staab played every minute of the Spirit's season once again.

On April 29, 2023, Staab made her 73rd consecutive regular season start in the NWSL, breaking a record held by Amber Brooks. As of October 20, 2023, Staab has played every minute of 90 consecutive matches, completing three iron woman seasons. She was nominated for NWSL Defender of the Year in the 2023 season.

=== Chicago Stars ===
Staab was traded to the Chicago Red Stars (later named Chicago Stars FC) on January 12, 2024, the day of the 2024 NWSL Draft, for the third pick of the draft. On July 25, 2024, Staab was placed on the season-ending injury list after tearing her Achilles tendon during a match against NJ/NY Gotham FC on July 20.

== International career ==
Staab attended training camp with the United States under-19 team in January 2016. Staab was first selected for the United States under-23 team in March 2018 for the 2018 Thorns Spring Invitational. She was called up again for the 2018 Nordic Tournament, where she was the only non-professional player selected for the U.S. roster. She started all three games, and scored the game-winning goal for the United States in the final match, ensuring a first-place result in the tournament.

Staab received her first senior national team call-up in May 2024, making her debut as a 61st-minute substitute in a friendly against South Korea on June 1.

== Career statistics ==
=== International ===
As of match played June 4, 2024

Appearances and goals by national team and year
National team	Year	Apps	Goals
United States	2024	2	0
Total		2	0

== Honors ==
Individual

- NWSL Team of the Month: May, June 2019
- NWSL Best XI: 2023
- Atlantic Coast Conference Defensive Player of the Year: 2018
