= Louisville Cardinals women's soccer =

American college soccer team

- 2025 Louisville Cardinals women's soccer team
- Founded: 1985; 41 years ago
- University: University of Louisville
- Head coach: Karen Ferguson-Dayes (26th season)
- Conference: ACC
- Location: Louisville, Kentucky, US
- Stadium: Lynn Stadium (capacity: 5,300)
- Nickname: Cardinals
- Colors: Red and black
Home	Away

NCAA tournament Round of 16
- 2011

NCAA tournament Round of 32
- 2011, 2019, 2025

NCAA tournament appearances
- 2006, 2007, 2011, 2013, 2018, 2019, 2025

Conference regular season championships
- 2011

The Louisville Cardinals women's soccer team represent University of Louisville in the Atlantic Coast Conference (ACC) of NCAA Division I women's college soccer. The team has never won the ACC regular season championship, but has won both the Big East and Conference USA regular season championship once. The team has advanced to the NCAA Women's soccer tournament seven times, with their best finish being the Round of 16 in 2011.

== History ==
=== 1980s ===
The Louisville women's soccer program began in 1985, under the direction of head coach Chip Wilkinson. Wilkinson stayed on staff for three years, until 1987. Under his direction, the team never had a winning season, coming the closest in their inaugural season. In 1985 the team finished 8–9–0. Sandy Davis was hired as the head coach for one year, 1988, and lead the team to a 6–11 record. In 1989, Jeff Yan and Melissa Mattingly were co-head coaches and the team saw no improvement finishing 6–10–0.

=== 1990s ===
Jeff Yan was retained as head coach for 1990 and 1991, but the team regressed. Finishing a combined 7–27–1 in his two years as sole head coach. To start the 1992 season, Sam Asamoah was hired as head coach. His first season was a struggle, seeing the team improve slightly to finish at 5–12–1. The team saw a big jump in 1993, when they finished with their first winning season in program history at 11–7–0. In 1995, the team joined Conference USA and won a share of the regular season title that year, finishing 4–1–0 in the conference. This success proved fleeting as Asamoah left as head coach after the season. Tony Colavecchia took over in 1996 and the team finished 9–9–2. The downturn continued in 1997 with a 7–13–0 season as Karla Thompson took over as head coach after a 5–1 start and saw out the decade. The 1998 and 1999 seasons, were the two worst in program history. The Cardinals won only one game in the two-year span.

=== 2000s ===
To start the decade Karen Ferguson (later Karen Ferguson-Dayes) was hired as the new head coach. Her first season was difficult, with the team going 1–18–1 in her first season. However, the team continued to improve, increasing their win totals each year until 2005. 2004 was a bit of a breakthrough with the team finishing tied for fourth in Conference USA, and qualifying for the conference tournament for the first time since 1997. Following that solid season, the Cardinals moved to the Big East Conference in 2005. Their new venture proved successful, as the Cardinals finished no lower than fourth in their division and qualified for the Big East Conference Women's Soccer Tournament their first four years in the conference. The team finished as runners up in the conference tournament in 2006 and 2007. Along with the runner up finishes, the Cardinals qualified for their first two NCAA Tournaments. However, the team lost in the first round in both tournaments. 2009 proved to be a bump in the road, as the team finished 5–11–1, seventh in the division, and did not qualify for the conference tournament.

=== 2010s ===
The 2010s began well, with the Cardinals winning double digit games in the first four years of the decade. They also qualified for the Big East Tournament in 2010 and 2012, including another runner up finish in 2011. In 2013, the Cardinals moved to the American Athletic Conference. Their only season there would prove a successful one. The team finished 12–5–2 and qualified for both the AAC Tournament and the NCAA Tournament. However, the team would lose in the first round of both. Their membership in the AAC would last only one year, and the team moved to the Atlantic Coast Conference in 2014. Life in the ACC would prove difficult at first with the Cardinals finishing with no more than 9 wins in a season between 2014 and 2017. The team did not qualify for the ACC Women's Soccer Tournament nor the NCAA Tournament in any of those years. Their best conference finish during this period was eighth in 2014. 2018 proved to be a turnaround year, with the Cardinals finishing 12–7–0 and qualifying for both the ACC and NCAA tournaments. The season ended with first round losses in both those tournaments. The Cardinals closed the decade with another successful season, finishing 13–5–2 with their best ever ACC finish of fourth place. They made the second round of the NCAA Tournament for the second time in program history.

=== 2020s ===
The decade started with a season shortened by the COVID-19 pandemic. The team played only four non-conference games and played a shortened eight game ACC schedule. The team finished in sixth place, but lost in the first round of the ACC Tournament. The team returned to a more normal schedule in 2021 and posted a 7–7–2 overall record along with a 3–6–1 ACC record to finish in 11th place, their lowest conference finish since joining the ACC. 2022 did not bring much improvement as the team finished 6–8–2 overall and 3–7–0 in ACC play to finish in tenth place. In 2023, the Cardinals finished 4–9–5 overall and 3–5–2 in the ACC. The four wins was the program's lowest overall total since 2001. This marked the third straight year with three ACC wins. 2024 was another middling season where the team finished 7–6–5 overall and 2–5–3 in the ACC. They again did not qualify for the ACC Tournament or the NCAA tournament, extending their streak of missing the latter to five straight years. The Cardinals experienced success in 2025, finishing 13–5–3 overall and 6–2–2 in ACC play. Their win totals in both ACC play and overall were the highest of the decade. They qualified for both the ACC Tournament and NCAA Tournament for the first time since 2020 and 2019, respectively.

== Players ==
=== Current roster ===
As of November 2026

Note: Flags indicate national team as defined under FIFA eligibility rules; some limited exceptions apply. Players may hold more than one non-FIFA nationality.

No.	Pos.	Nation	Player
0	GK	USA	Brielle Baker
1	GK	USA	Suzie Roginski
2	MF	USA	Betsy Huckaby
3	DF	USA	Norah Roush
4	MF	USA	Liza Suydam
5	DF	USA	Grace Maddox
6	DF	USA	Taylor Wilson
7	FW	USA	Nicole Jodoin
8	MF	USA	Abby Cox
10	FW	USA	Karina Peat
11	MF	USA	Amelia Swinarski
13	MF	USA	Kiley Peat
14	FW	USA	Liz Eddy

No.	Pos.	Nation	Player
15	MF	USA	Lilia Work
16	DF	USA	Avery George
17	DF	USA	Brooklyn Lee
20	FW	USA	Fina Davy
21	DF	USA	Ella Bard
22	FW	USA	McKalie Ball
23	GK	USA	Cate Cantu
24	MF	USA	AG Gibson
25	FW	USA	Ashlyn Huie
26	DF	GER	Eefje Bötjer
68	DF	USA	Trista Morris
86	FW	USA	Taylor Morris

=== Current professional players ===
As of February 4, 2026

- (Jamaica) Christine Exeter (2010–2013) – Currently with Whitby FC
- (Canada) Charlyn Corral (2012–13) – Currently with Pachuca and Mexico international
- (Jamaica) Chinyelu Asher (2014) – Currently with DC Power FC
- (Brazil) Kathellen Sousa (2016) – Currently with Al Nassr
- (England) Mollie Rouse (2017–2018) – Currently with Sheffield United
- Emina Ekić (2017–2020) – Currently with Lexington SC and Bosnia and Herzegovina international
- (Canada) Jessica De Filippo (2019–2020) – Currently with Vancouver Rise FC
- Nina Nicosia (2021) – Currently with C.F. Pachuca and Argentina international
- Anouk Denton (2021–2022) – Currently with Bay FC and England international
- (United States) Autumn Weeks (2022–2023) – Currently with Odysseas Moschatou
- (United States) Karsyn Cherry (2022–2025) – Currently with Angel City FC
- (England) Lucy Roberts (2023) – Currently with F.C. Copenhagen

== Coaches ==
=== Current staff ===
Position	Staff
Karen Ferguson-Dayes	Head coach
Hunter Norton	Associate head coach
Olivia Mills	Assistant coach
Jing Hughley	Director of Operations

== Seasons ==
Season	Head coach	Season result							Tournament results	
Season	Head coach	Overall			Conference				Conference	NCAA
Season	Head coach	Wins	Losses	Ties	Wins	Losses	Ties	Finish	Conference	NCAA
1985	Chip Wilkinson	8	9	0	No Conference					—
1986	Chip Wilkinson	6	10	1	No Conference					—
1987	Chip Wilkinson	3	9	1	No Conference					—
1988	Sandy Davis	6	11	0	No Conference					—
1989	Jeff Yan & Melissa Mattingly	6	10	0	No Conference					—
1990	Jeff Yan	4	15	0	No Conference					—
1991	Jeff Yan	3	12	1	No Conference					—
1992	Sam Asamoah	5	12	1	No Conference					—
1993	Sam Asamoah	11	7	0	No Conference					—
1994	Sam Asamoah	7	10	3	No Conference					—
1995†	Sam Asamoah	9	9	0	4	1	0	T-1st	Second round	—
1996	Tony Colavecchia	9	9	2	5	3	1	4th	First round	—
1997	Tony Colavecchia	5	1	0	2	0	0	8th	Second round	—
1997	Karla Thompson	2	12	0	1	6	0	8th	Second round	—
1998	Karla Thompson	0	17	1	0	11	0	12th	—	
1999	Karla Thompson	1	17	0	0	11	0	12th	—	—
2000	Karen Ferguson-Dayes	1	18	1	0	11	0	12th	—	—
2001	Karen Ferguson-Dayes	4	13	0	2	8	0	12th	—	—
2002	Karen Ferguson-Dayes	5	12	1	1	8	1	14th	—	—
2003	Karen Ferguson-Dayes	7	9	2	2	7	1	12th	—	—
2004	Karen Ferguson-Dayes	12	5	3	5	2	3	T-4th	Second round	—
2005^	Karen Ferguson-Dayes	11	8	0	6	5	0	3rd-B	Second round	—
2006	Karen Ferguson-Dayes	13	4	3	7	4	0	4th – National	Runner up	First round
2007	Karen Ferguson-Dayes	13	6	2	7	3	1	2nd – National	Runner up	First round
2008	Karen Ferguson-Dayes	9	7	3	6	3	2	4th – National	Second round	—
2009	Karen Ferguson-Dayes	5	11	1	2	8	1	7th – National	—	—
2010	Karen Ferguson-Dayes	10	9	0	4	7	0	5th – National	First round	—
2011	Karen Ferguson-Dayes	14	7	3	8	1	2	1st – National	Runner up	Third round
2012	Karen Ferguson-Dayes	10	4	4	5	3	3	3rd – National	First round	—
2013‡	Karen Ferguson-Dayes	12	5	2	7	1	0	2nd	First round	First round
2014‡	Karen Ferguson-Dayes	7	9	2	3	5	2	8th	—	—
2015	Karen Ferguson-Dayes	8	8	2	4	5	1	9th	—	—
2016	Karen Ferguson-Dayes	7	7	4	2	5	3	10th	—	—
2017	Karen Ferguson-Dayes	9	7	2	3	5	2	10th	—	—
2018	Karen Ferguson-Dayes	12	7	0	6	4	0	T-5th	First round	First round
2019	Karen Ferguson-Dayes	13	5	2	5	3	2	4th	First round	Second round
2020	Karen Ferguson-Dayes	5	7	0	4	4	0	6th	First round	—
2021	Karen Ferguson-Dayes	7	7	2	3	6	1	11th	—	—
2022	Karen Ferguson-Dayes	6	8	2	3	7	0	10th	—	—
2023	Karen Ferguson-Dayes	4	9	5	3	5	2	9th	—	—
2024	Karen Ferguson-Dayes	7	6	5	2	5	3	12th	—	—
2025	Karen Ferguson-Dayes	13	5	3	6	2	2	T-4th	First round	Second round

†In 1995, Louisville began play in Conference USA.
^In 2005, Louisville began play in the Big East Conference.
‡In 2013, Louisville played one season in the American Athletic Conference before moving to the Atlantic Coast Conference in 2014.
