= Meghan McCool =

American soccer player

Personal information
- Date of birth: September 14, 1997 (age 29)
- Place of birth: Glenside, Pennsylvania, U.S.
- Height: 5 ft 8 in (1.73 m)
- Position: Midfielder

College career
| Years | Team | Apps | (Gls) |
| 2016–2019 | Virginia Cavaliers | 88 | (27) |

Senior career*
| Years | Team | Apps | (Gls) |
| 2020 | Washington Spirit | 3 | (0) |
- * Club domestic league appearances and goals

Meghan McCool (born September 14, 1997) is an American former professional soccer player who played as a midfielder for National Women's Soccer League (NWSL) club Washington Spirit.

== Club career ==
=== Washington Spirit ===
McCool made her NWSL debut on September 5, 2020.
