= Dorian Bailey =

American soccer player (born 1997)

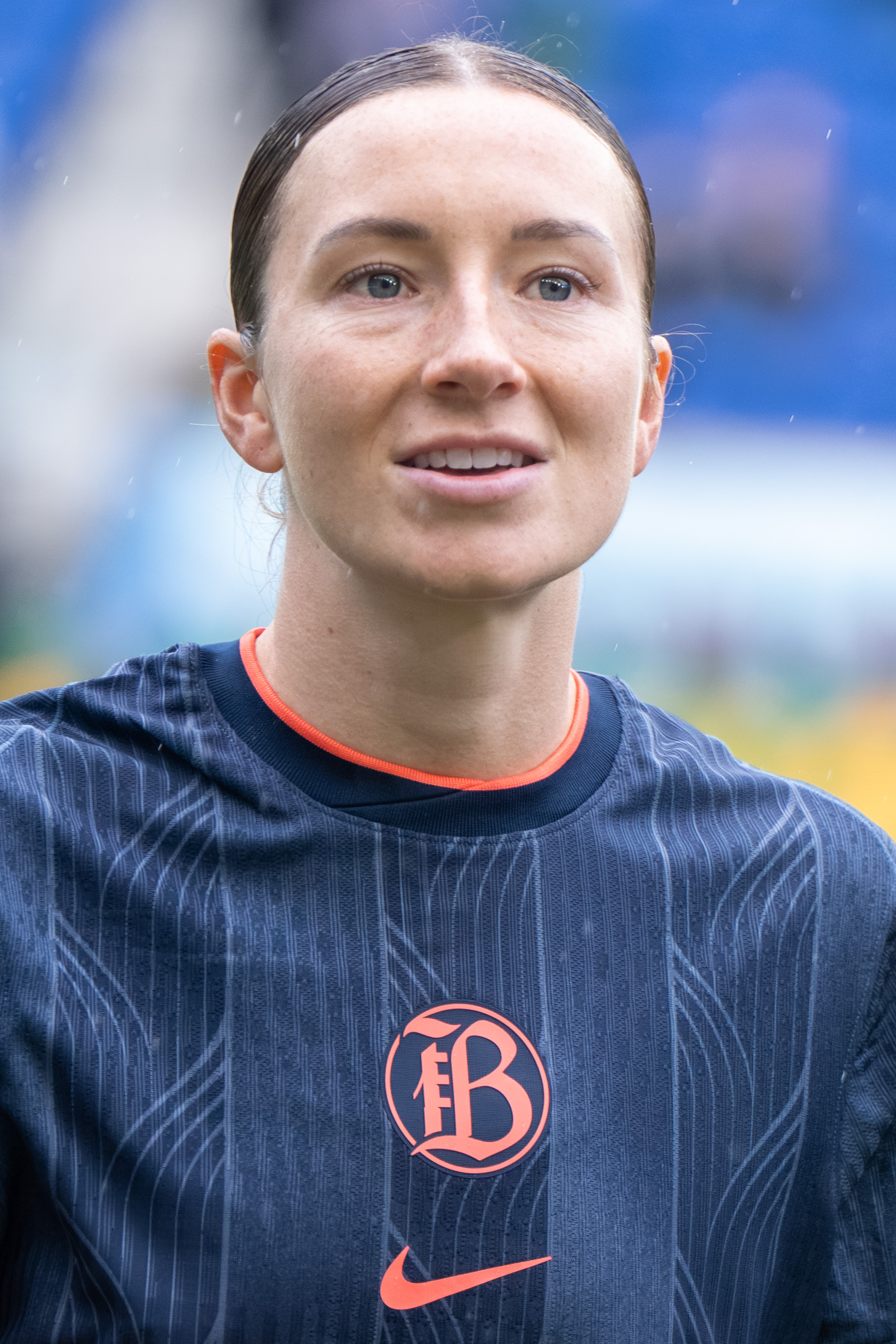
- Bailey with Bay FC in 2026

Personal information
- Full name: Dorian Josey Bailey
- Date of birth: January 28, 1997 (age 29)
- Place of birth: Mission, Kansas, United States
- Height: 5 ft 6 in (1.68 m)
- Position: Midfielder

Team information
- Current team: Bay FC
- Number: 19

College career
| Years | Team | Apps | (Gls) |
| 2015–2018 | North Carolina Tar Heels | 86 | (17) |

Senior career*
| Years | Team | Apps | (Gls) |
| 2019–2023 | Washington Spirit | 39 | (1) |
| 2024– | Bay FC | 69 | (3) |

International career
| 2013–2014 | United States U17 | | |
| 2014 | United States U18 | | |
| 2015 | United States U19 | | |
| 2016 | United States U20 | | |
| 2017–2018 | United States U23 | | |
- * Club domestic league appearances and goals as of 05:04, November 2, 2026 (UTC)

Dorian Josey Bailey (born January 28, 1997) is an American professional soccer player who plays as a midfielder for Bay FC of the National Women's Soccer League (NWSL). She played college soccer for the North Carolina Tar Heels and was drafted by the Washington Spirit in the first round of the 2019 NWSL College Draft.

== Early life ==
Bailey grew up in the Kansas City metropolitan area and went to St. Teresa's Academy.

=== North Carolina Tar Heels ===
Bailey attended University of North Carolina where she played for the North Carolina Tar Heels from 2015 to 2018. In 2015, she was named to the Freshman All-ACC Team. In four years, she played in 86 games, scoring 17 times and registering 17 assists.

== Club career ==
=== Washington Spirit ===
Bailey was drafted 8th overall in the first round of the 2019 NWSL College Draft by the Washington Spirit. In April, she was signed to their active roster in advance of the 2019 NWSL season. Bailey made her first professional appearance on April 13, 2019, as a 79th-minute substitute in Washington's season opening win over Sky Blue FC.

=== Bay FC ===
Bailey was traded to NWSL expansion club Bay FC on December 12, 2023.

== International career ==
In 2013, Bailey was called up to the United States under-17 national team, winning a bronze medal in the 2013 CONCACAF Women's U-17 Championship. She scored her first youth international goal in a group stage win over Guatemala. In April 2014, she received an invitation to the United States under-18 squad's training camp. The following year, Bailey received invitations to training camps with both the United States under-19 and United States under-20 national teams. Bailey played in the 2018 Thorns Spring Invitational with the United States under-23 national team.

== Honors ==
Washington Spirit

- NWSL Championship: 2021
