= Julia Ashley =

American soccer player (born 1996)

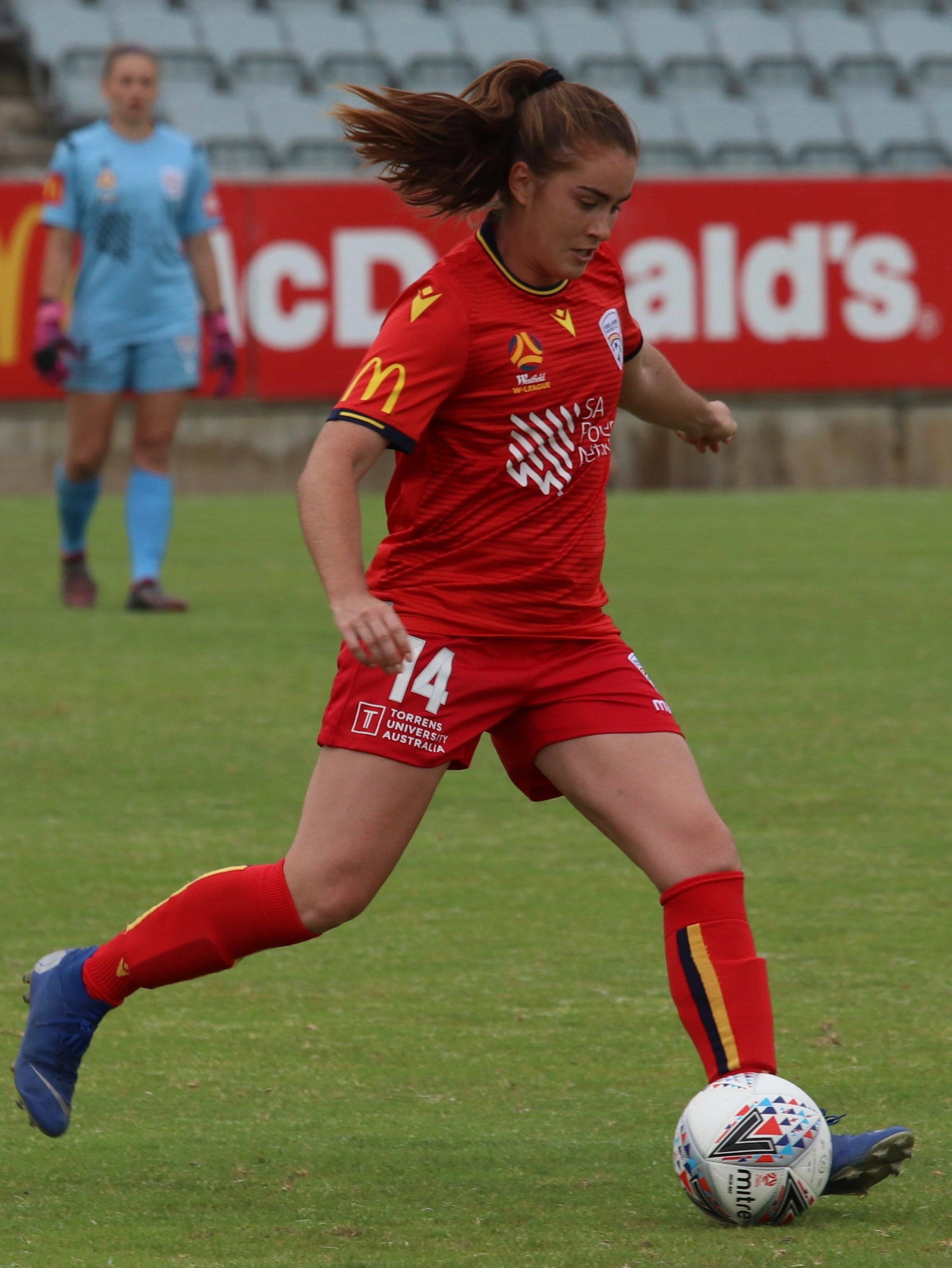
- Ashley with Adelaide United in 2019

Personal information
- Full name: Julia Elizabeth Ashley
- Date of birth: November 11, 1996 (age 29)
- Place of birth: Verona, New Jersey, United States
- Height: 5 ft 8 in (1.73 m)
- Position: Defender

Youth career
- Match Fit Colchesters

College career
Years	Team	Apps	(Gls)
2015–2018	North Carolina Tar Heels	94	(8)

Senior career*
Years	Team	Apps	(Gls)
2019	Linköpings FC	1	(0)
2019–2020	Adelaide United	8	(0)
2020	OL Reign	0	(0)
2021	Racing Louisville	15	(0)
2022	Houston Dash	5	(0)

International career^{‡}
2016	United States U20		
2018	United States U23	1	(0)
- * Club domestic league appearances and goals as of March 5, 2020 ‡ National team caps and goals as of May 22, 2019

Julia Elizabeth Ashley (born November 11, 1996) is an American former professional soccer player who played as a defender. She played college soccer for the North Carolina Tar Heels before spending her professional career with Adelaide United, Linköpings FC, Racing Louisville FC, and the Houston Dash.

== Early life ==
Ashley was born in Verona, New Jersey, to Suzanne and Martin Ashley, and has two sisters. She attended Verona High School, where she only played one year of soccer due to commitments with her club team, Match Fit Colchesters. She also competed in track and field during high school, setting school records in 400 meters, 800 meters, and indoor and outdoor mile. In the mile, she recorded the third-fastest time nationally as a freshman.

== College career ==
In Ashley's freshman season she started all 21 games at right back and was named to the 2015 Freshman All-ACC Team. In her sophomore year, she played in 24 games and ranked second on the team in minutes played. In her junior year, Ashley was one of the nation's most consistent defensive performers, she started all 22 games at right back and was second-team All-ACC and was named to the 2017 All-ACC Academic Women's Soccer Team. In her senior season, Ashley started all 25 games for the Tar Heels as they advanced all the way to the College Cup Final, where they were defeated 1–0 by Florida State.

== Club career ==
On January 20, 2019, Ashley signed a five-month contract with Linköpings FC in the Damallsvenskan in Sweden. She made her professional debut on February 16, starting in a Svenska Cupen game against Växjö. She made her league debut against the same opposition on April 17. On May 22, 2019, she was released by the team having struggled for playing time with injury and competition within the squad.

In November 2019, Ashley signed a deal with Australian club Adelaide United. She made her debut for the team on November 14, starting in the 2019–20 season opener against Western Sydney Wanderers.

Ashley was originally selected by Sky Blue FC with the 6th overall pick in the 2019 NWSL College Draft, but she never signed for the club. She expressed a hope that Sky Blue would either trade her NWSL rights to another team or release her. On January 17, 2020, Sky Blue traded her NWSL rights to Reign FC. Ashley subsequently signed a three-year contract with Reign FC on March 4, 2020.

On November 12, 2020, Ashley was chosen by Racing Louisville FC in the 2020 NWSL Expansion Draft.

She was traded to Houston Dash in December 2021.

In 2023, Ashley retired from professional soccer due to persistent injuries that included herniated discs and knee problems.

== International career ==
Ashley was part of the United States U–20 player pool and was called up to a U–20 camp in January 2016. In 2018 she was named to the United States U–23 roster for the 2018 Thorns Spring Invitational. She received another U–23 call-up in March 2019 for the La Manga Tournament in Spain.

== Career statistics ==
=== Club ===
As of match played November 14, 2019.

Appearances and goals by club, season and competition
Club	League	Season	League		Cup (Note: Includes the Svenska Cupen)		Continental (Note: Includes the UEFA Women's Champions League)		Total	
Club	League	Season	Apps	Goals	Apps	Goals	Apps	Goals	Apps	Goals
Linköpings	Damallsvenskan	2019	1	0	2	0	0	0	3	0
Adelaide United	W-League	2019–20	1	0	–		–		1	0
Career total			2	0	2	0	0	0	4	0
