= Virginia Tech Hokies women's soccer =

American college soccer team

- 2026 Virginia Tech Hokies women's soccer team
- Founded: 1980; 46 years ago
- University: Virginia Tech
- Head coach: Charles Adair (16th season)
- Conference: ACC
- Location: Blacksburg, Virginia, US
- Stadium: Sandra D. Thompson Field (capacity: 2,500)
- Nickname: Hokies
- Colors: Chicago maroon and burnt orange
Home	Away

NCAA tournament College Cup
- 2013

NCAA tournament Quarterfinals
- 2013, 2024

NCAA tournament Round of 16
- 2009, 2011, 2013, 2014, 2018, 2024

NCAA tournament Round of 32
- 2009, 2011, 2013, 2014, 2015, 2018, 2021, 2024

NCAA tournament appearances
- 2004, 2008, 2009, 2010, 2011, 2012, 2013, 2014, 2015, 2018, 2019, 2021, 2022, 2024

The Virginia Tech Hokies women's soccer team began play in 1980 with two club teams under the guidance of Everett Germain and his two daughters, Betsy and Julie. Virginia Tech's women's soccer became a college soccer program that competes in NCAA Division I in 1993. The team played in the A-10 and the Big East before moving ove to the Coastal Division of Atlantic Coast Conference in 2014. The team has advanced to the NCAA Women's soccer tournament nine times. Their best appearance is reaching the semifinals in 2013. Their home matches are played at Sandra D. Thompson Field.

== History ==
=== 1990s ===
The Virginia Tech Hokies women's soccer team began play under coach Sam Okpodu in 1993. The team had a respectable first season, finishing 6–10–1. The team began play without a conference. A small improvement followed in the team's second season; they finished with a record of 8–11–0. In 1995 the Hokies began play in the Atlantic 10 Conference, where the school was a member in other sports. The move proved difficult, with the Hokies finishing 3–12–3 overall, and 1–3–1 in their first conference season. However, improvement quickly followed, with the team achieving a .500 record in overall play and a winning record in conference play in 1996. The team won nine games in each season from 1996 to 1999. Their loss record was remarkably consistent as well, with the Hokies losing nine games from 1996 to 1998 and ten in 1999.

=== 2000s ===
The decade of the 2000s started in a very similar fashion, with the team going 9–10–0. In 2000, the team did not participate in a conference as the university transitioned into joining the Big East Conference. 2001 was the team's first season in the Big East, and proved a difficult one. The Hokies finished 8–9–3 overall, but 1–8–1 in conference play. After the season, Sam Okpodu left as head coach to pursue an opportunity with the Nigerian National Team. Jerry Cheynet switched from coaching the men's team to the women's team. In his only season as head coach, the team finished 6–11–1 and 2–4 in conference play. Kelly Cagle took over as the program's third head coach in program history in 2003. She achieved a 9–9 record in her first season. 2004 proved to be a turning point year for the Hokies. First, the school joined the Atlantic Coast Conference. In their first year in the ACC, the team achieved their first winning season in program history, finishing 11–9–0. Additionally, they qualified for their first postseason, qualifying for both the ACC Tournament and the NCAA Tournament. The 2004 postseason qualification was not followed up until 2008. The team posted losing records in 2005 and 2006. Despite a 8–7–3 record in 2007, the Hokies did not qualify for either tournament. In 2008, the Hokies were runners up in the ACC Tournament, their best finish in program history. They also began a run of qualifying for eight straight NCAA tournaments in 2008. The decade closed with a program best for wins, with 16. The previous record was in 2004, with 11. The Hokies also achieved only their second winning conference record in 2009.

=== 2010s ===
The decade started with the Hokies continuing to qualify for the ACC and NCAA tournaments, and winning double-digit games. 2010 marked the third straight year that the Hokies achieved each of those milestones. However, after the season, coach Kelly Cagle resigned to relocate her family to the Southwest. Charles Adair was hired as her replacement. He had been the associate head coach at Virginia Tech for the previous five years. Adair picked up where Cagle left off. In his first season, the Hokies won 14 games, and finally broke through the first round of the NCAA tournament. The team reached the Sweet 16 for the first time in program history. In 2012, the Hokies finished 4–5–1 in conference play for the third straight year. This record was good enough to qualify for the ACC Tournament in the previous two years, but was not good enough in 2012. However, the team did make another NCAA Tournament appearance. 2013 was arguably the best season in program history. The Hokies set a program record for wins, with 19, finished as runner up in the ACC Tournament, and reached the semifinals of the NCAA Tournament. Their nine conference wins are a program record by three wins. The Hokies could not repeat the heights of 2013 in 2014. The team finished with 16 wins, and notched another NCAA Sweet 16 appearance, but their 5–5 ACC record was not good enough to qualify for the tournament. This was in part because the ACC reduced the tournament size to four teams instead of eight. 2015 saw the Hokies' win total drop by 1, to 15. They lost in the second round of the NCAA Tournament and missed the ACC Tournament despite a 6–3–1 conference record. 2016 ended a run of eight straight NCAA appearances. The Hokies did finish with a winning record of 11–5–3, but had a sub-par 3–4–3 conference record. They endured a disappointing 2017 where they went 1–5–4 in conference play. 2018 proved to be a rebound, with the team qualifying for the ACC and NCAA tournaments after a two-year hiatus. The Sweet 16 appearance in the NCAA tournament was their best result since 2014.

=== 2020s ===
The decade started with a season shortened by the COVID-19 pandemic The team played a shortened out-of-conference schedule and only eight games in the ACC. They finished seventh, and lost in the first round of the ACC Tournament. In 2021 the team returned to a more normal conference schedule, posted a 12–6–2 overall record, and went 5–3–2 in ACC play to finish in eighth place. The ACC tournament only invited six teams, so they did not qualify. They reached the Round of 32 in the NCAA Tournament. In 2022, the Hokies finished 10–6–2 overall and 4–5–1 in ACC play to finish in eighth place again. They did earn an at-large invitation to the NCAA Tournament, but lost in the first round. Their qualification marked the fourth time in five years that the team qualified for the NCAA Tournament. 2023 saw the Hokies finish 7–8–3 overall and 4–6–0 in ACC play. They did not qualify for the ACC Tournament, and missed the NCAA Tournament for the second time in four years. The Hokies would rebound in 2024, finishing 14–6–3 overall and 6–2–2 in ACC play. They qualified for the ACC tournament for the first time in four years, and reached the Quarterfinals of the NCAA Tournament for the second time in program history. They could not keep their momentum from 2024 going into 2025, however and finished 4–10–4 overall and 0–8–2 in ACC play. Their four wins, were their second lowest in program history, and it was the first season they failed to win a conference game in program history.

== Personnel ==
=== Roster ===
As of November 2026

Note: Flags indicate national team as defined under FIFA eligibility rules; some limited exceptions apply. Players may hold more than one non-FIFA nationality.

No.	Pos.	Nation	Player
0	GK	USA	Savannah Sabo
00	GK	USA	Julianna Trujillo
1	GK	USA	Chase Rooney
2	MF	USA	Annie DeHaan
3	FW	USA	Anna Weir
4	MF	USA	Peyton May
5	MF	USA	Hannah Pachan
6	DF	CAN	Madi Boutot
7	MF	USA	Ellie Robertson
8	MF	USA	Gabby Ciocca
9	FW	USA	Eliana Salama
10	FW	ITA	Letizia Rossi
11	DF	CAN	Christine Eiblmeier

No.	Pos.	Nation	Player
12	FW	USA	Lily Pantaleo
13	DF	USA	Bella Ganiere
14	MF	CAN	Adeline Mantie
15	FW	USA	Lilli Lubic
16	FW	USA	Anna Garrow
17	FW	USA	Riley Karpinski
19	DF	USA	Maya Goddard
20	MF	USA	Syri Davis
22	MF	USA	Johannah Bradley
24	DF	DEN	Celine Kampmann
25	MF	SWE	Sofia Skuthälla
28	DF	USA	Julia Tepes
37	FW	USA	Sarah Rosenbaum

=== Team management ===
Position	Staff
Head coach	Charles Adair
Associate head coach	Drew Kopp
Assistant coach	Matt Gwilliam
Director of operations	Katie Flores

== Seasons ==
Season	Head coach	Season result						Tournament results	
Season	Head coach	Overall			Conference			Conference	NCAA
Season	Head coach	Wins	Losses	Ties	Wins	Losses	Ties	Conference	NCAA
1993	Sam Okpodu	6	10	1	No conference				—
1994	Sam Okpodu	8	11	0	No conference				—
1995†	Sam Okpodu	3	12	3	1	3	1	—	—
1996	Sam Okpodu	9	9	1	5	3	0	—	—
1997	Sam Okpodu	9	9	1	4	6	1	—	—
1998	Sam Okpodu	9	9	1	5	6	0	—	—
1999	Sam Okpodu	9	10	0	5	6	0	—	—
2000	Sam Okpodu	9	10	0	No conference				—
2001‡	Sam Okpodu	8	9	3	1	8	1	—	—
2002	Jerry Cheynet	6	11	1	2	4	0	—	—
2003	Kelly Cagle	9	9	0	2	4	0	—	—
2004^	Kelly Cagle	11	9	0	4	5	0	First round	NCAA First Round
2005	Kelly Cagle	6	10	3	1	7	2	—	—
2006	Kelly Cagle	6	8	4	1	6	3	—	—
2007	Kelly Cagle	8	7	3	3	5	2	—	—
2008	Kelly Cagle	10	9	4	4	4	2	Runner up	NCAA First Round
2009	Kelly Cagle	16	8	0	6	4	0	Second round	NCAA Round of 16
2010	Kelly Cagle	10	10	1	4	5	1	First round	NCAA First Round
2011	Charles Adair	14	8	1	4	5	1	First round	NCAA Sweet 16
2012	Charles Adair	13	6	1	4	5	1	—	NCAA First Round
2013	Charles Adair	19	5	3	9	3	1	Runner up	NCAA Semifinals
2014	Charles Adair	16	6	0	5	5	0	—	NCAA Sweet 16
2015	Charles Adair	15	4	2	6	3	1	—	NCAA Second Round
2016	Charles Adair	11	5	3	3	4	3	—	—
2017	Charles Adair	7	6	5	1	5	4	—	—
2018	Charles Adair	11	8	3	5	5	0	First round	NCAA Sweet 16
2019	Charles Adair	12	5	2	4	4	2	–	NCAA First Round
2020	Charles Adair	8	9	0	4	4	0	First round	—
2021	Charles Adair	12	6	2	5	3	2	—	NCAA Second Round
2022	Charles Adair	10	6	2	4	5	1	—	NCAA Second Round
2023	Charles Adair	7	8	3	4	6	0	—	—
2024	Charles Adair	14	6	3	6	2	2	First round	NCAA Quarterfinals
2025	Charles Adair	4	10	4	0	8	2	—	—

† In 1995 the Hokies began play in the Atlantic 10 Conference.
‡ In 2001 the Hokies began play in the Big East Conference.
^ In 2004 the Hokies began play in the Atlantic Coast Conference.

== Notable alumni ==
=== Current professional players ===
As of November 25, 2025

- (United States) Kari Nicole Campos (2014–2017) - currently with Alajuelense
- Chandler McDaniel (2016–2017) - currently with Stallion Laguna and Philippines national team
- Mandy McGlynn (2016–2019) - currently with Utah Royals and United States international
- Nicole Kozlova (2017–2021) - currently with Glasgow City F.C. and Ukraine international
- (United States) Emily Gray (2018–2021) - currently with Utah Royals
- (Norway) Victoria Haugen (2020–2023) - currently with Tampa Bay Sun FC
- (United States) Allie George (2021–2024) - currently with Racing Louisville FC
