= 2017 ACC women's soccer tournament =

- Classification: Division I
- Teams: 8
- Matches: 7
- Attendance: 4,094
- Site: MUSC Health Stadium; Charleston, South Carolina (Semifinals and Final)
- Champions: North Carolina (21st title)
- Winning coach: Anson Dorrance (21st title)
- MVP: Alessia Russo (North Carolina)
- Broadcast: ACC Network (Quarterfinals), ACC Regional Sports Networks (Semifinals), ESPNU (Final)

2017 ACC women's soccer standings
	Conf.						Overall
Team	W		L		T	PCT	W		L		T	PCT
No. 3 Duke ‍†‍‍^{y}	10	–	0	–	0	1.000	23	–	2	–	1	.904
#8 North Carolina ‡^{y} ‍‍‍	8	–	0	–	2	.900	17	–	3	–	2	.818
No. 21 NC State ‍‍‍^{y}	6	–	3	–	1	.650	15	–	5	–	2	.727
No. 9 Virginia ‍‍‍^{y}	5	–	2	–	3	.650	13	–	7	–	4	.625
Wake Forest ‍‍‍^{y}	5	–	3	–	2	.600	11	–	7	–	4	.591
No. 18 Notre Dame ‍‍‍^{y}	5	–	3	–	2	.600	9	–	8	–	5	.523
No. 15 Florida State ‍‍‍^{y}	5	–	4	–	1	.550	13	–	7	–	1	.643
Boston College ‍‍‍	4	–	5	–	1	.450	10	–	9	–	1	.525
Clemson ‍‍‍^{y}	3	–	4	–	3	.450	10	–	5	–	4	.632
Louisville ‍‍‍	3	–	5	–	2	.400	9	–	7	–	2	.556
Syracuse ‍‍‍	2	–	6	–	1	.278	7	–	8	–	2	.471
Virginia Tech ‍‍‍	1	–	5	–	3	.278	7	–	6	–	5	.528
Miami ‍‍‍	1	–	9	–	0	.100	5	–	11	–	0	.313
Pittsburgh ‍‍‍	0	–	9	–	1	.050	3	–	12	–	3	.250
† – Conference champion ‡ – 2017 ACC Tournament champion y – Invited to the NCAA Tournament; As of December 7, 2017; Rankings from United Soccer Coaches Poll; Source: The ACC

The 2017 ACC women's soccer tournament was the postseason women's soccer tournament for the Atlantic Coast Conference. The defending champions were the Florida State Seminoles, but they were eliminated from the 2017 tournament with a 2–1 quarterfinal loss at North Carolina. North Carolina won the tournament with a 1–0 win over Duke in the final. The title was the 21st for the North Carolina women's soccer program, all of which have come under the direction of head coach Anson Dorrance.

== Qualification ==
The top eight teams in the Atlantic Coast Conference earned a berth into the ACC Tournament. The quarterfinal round was held at campus sites, while the semifinals and final took place at MUSC Health Stadium in Charleston, SC. Six of the eight teams in the tournament were ranked in the United Soccer Coaches poll prior to the beginning of the tournament.

== Bracket ==
Quarterfinals; Sunday, October 29
1	Duke	3
8	Boston College	1
4	Virginia	2
5	Wake Forest	1
2	North Carolina	2
7	Florida State	1
3	NC State	4
6	Notre Dame	1

Semifinals; Friday, November 3
1	Duke	1
4	Virginia	0
2	North Carolina	1
3	NC State	0

Final; Sunday, November 5
1	Duke	0
2	North Carolina	1

== Schedule ==
=== Quarterfinals ===
October 29, 2017	#1 Duke	3–1	#8 Boston College	Durham, NC
1:00 p.m. EDT	Chelsea Burns 14'; Imani Dorsey 27'; Kayla McCoy 41'	Report	76' Carly Leipzig	Stadium: Koskinen Stadium; Attendance: 230; Referee: Karl Kummer; Assistant referees: Charles Lester; Neil Barbulescu; Fourth official: Kevin Uitto

October 29, 2017	#2 North Carolina	2–1	#7 Florida State	Chapel Hill, NC
1:00 p.m. EDT	Zoe Redei 15'; Taylor Otto 53' (pen.)	Report	57' Dallas Dorosy	Stadium: Fetzer Field; Attendance: 289; Referee: Adrian Krell; Assistant referees: Dustin Thorne; Javier Rodriguez; Fourth official: Scott Bowers

October 29, 2017	#3 NC State	4–1	#6 Notre Dame	Raleigh, NC
1:00 p.m. EDT	Tziarra King 66', 77', 85'; Rachel Cox 72'	Report	61' Sabrina Flores	Stadium: Dail Soccer Stadium; Attendance: 173; Referee: Michael McBride; Assistant referees: Justin Howard; David McPhun; Fourth official: Jeremy Smith

October 29, 2017	#4 Virginia	2–1	#5 Wake Forest	Charlottesville, VA
1:00 p.m. EDT	Taryn Torres 55' (pen.); Meghan McCool 74'	Report	13' Bayley Feist	Stadium: Klöckner Stadium; Attendance: 257; Referee: Mathew Richardson; Assistant referees: Brad Wilson; Tyler McCauley; Fourth official: Chuck Ackerman

=== Semifinals ===
November 3, 2017	#1 Duke	1–0	#4 Virginia	Charleston, South Carolina
5:30 p.m. EDT	Ella Stevens 47'	Report		Stadium: MUSC Health Stadium; Referee: Nick Balcer; Assistant referees: Abbas Piran; Hudson Owens; Fourth official: David Erbacher

November 3, 2017	#2 North Carolina	1–0	#3 NC State	Charleston, South Carolina
8:00 p.m. EDT	Alessia Russo 56'	Report		Stadium: MUSC Health Stadium; Attendance: 1322; Referee: Sergio Gonzalez; Assistant referees: David McPhun; Peter Charpentier; Fourth official: David Erbacher

=== Final ===
November 5, 2017	#1 Duke	0–1	#2 North Carolina	Charleston, South Carolina
1:00 p.m. EST		Report	46' Zoe Redei	Stadium: MUSC Health Stadium; Attendance: 1823; Referee: David Erbacher; Assistant referees: Peter Charpentier; Jason Kent; Fourth official: Sergio Gonzalez

== Statistics ==
=== Goalscorers ===
3 goals

- (United States) Tziarra King – NC State

2 goals

- (United States) Zoe Redei – North Carolina

1 goal

- (United States) Chelsea Burns – Duke
- (United States) Rachel Cox – NC State
- (United States) Imani Dorsey – Duke
- (United States) Dallas Dorosy – Florida State
- (United States) Bayley Feist – Wake Forest
- (United States) Sabrina Flores – Notre Dame
- (United States) Carly Leipzig – Boston College
- (United States) Meghan McCool – Virginia
- (United States) Kayla McCoy – Duke
- (United States) Taylor Otto – North Carolina
- (England) Alessia Russo – North Carolina
- (United States) Ella Stevens – Duke
- (United States) Taryn Torres – Virginia

== All Tournament Team ==
Player	Team
Veronica Latsko	Virginia
Tziarra King	NC State
EJ Proctor	Duke
Ella Stevens	Duke
Schuyler DeBree	Duke
Kayla McCoy	Duke
Julia Ashley	North Carolina
Joanna Boyles	North Carolina
Dorian Bailey	North Carolina
Abby Elinsky	North Carolina
Alessia Russo (MVP)	North Carolina

== See also ==
- Atlantic Coast Conference
- 2017 Atlantic Coast Conference women's soccer season
- 2017 NCAA Division I women's soccer season
- 2017 NCAA Division I Women's Soccer Tournament
- 2017 ACC Men's Soccer Tournament
