= 2017 Atlantic Coast Conference women's soccer season =

- League: NCAA Division I
- Sport: Soccer
- Duration: August, 2017 – November, 2017
- Teams: 14

2018 NWSL College Draft
- Top draft pick: Quinn (Note: Then known as Rebecca Quinn)
- Picked by: Washington Spirit, 3rd overall

Regular season
- Season champions: Duke
- Runners-up: North Carolina
- Top scorer: Deyna Castellanos, Florida State Seminoles

Tournament
- Champions: North Carolina
- Runners-up: Duke
- Finals MVP: Alessia Russo, North Carolina Tar Heels

ACC women's soccer seasons
- ← 2016 2018 →

2017 ACC women's soccer standings
	Conf.						Overall
Team	W		L		T	PCT	W		L		T	PCT
No. 3 Duke ‍†‍‍^{y}	10	–	0	–	0	1.000	23	–	2	–	1	.904
#8 North Carolina ‡^{y} ‍‍‍	8	–	0	–	2	.900	17	–	3	–	2	.818
No. 21 NC State ‍‍‍^{y}	6	–	3	–	1	.650	15	–	5	–	2	.727
No. 9 Virginia ‍‍‍^{y}	5	–	2	–	3	.650	13	–	7	–	4	.625
Wake Forest ‍‍‍^{y}	5	–	3	–	2	.600	11	–	7	–	4	.591
No. 18 Notre Dame ‍‍‍^{y}	5	–	3	–	2	.600	9	–	8	–	5	.523
No. 15 Florida State ‍‍‍^{y}	5	–	4	–	1	.550	13	–	7	–	1	.643
Boston College ‍‍‍	4	–	5	–	1	.450	10	–	9	–	1	.525
Clemson ‍‍‍^{y}	3	–	4	–	3	.450	10	–	5	–	4	.632
Louisville ‍‍‍	3	–	5	–	2	.400	9	–	7	–	2	.556
Syracuse ‍‍‍	2	–	6	–	1	.278	7	–	8	–	2	.471
Virginia Tech ‍‍‍	1	–	5	–	3	.278	7	–	6	–	5	.528
Miami ‍‍‍	1	–	9	–	0	.100	5	–	11	–	0	.313
Pittsburgh ‍‍‍	0	–	9	–	1	.050	3	–	12	–	3	.250
† – Conference champion ‡ – 2017 ACC Tournament champion y – Invited to the NCAA Tournament; As of December 7, 2017; Rankings from United Soccer Coaches Poll; Source: The ACC

The 2017 Atlantic Coast Conference women's soccer season was the 29th season of women's varsity soccer in the conference.

The Notre Dame Fighting Irish and Clemson Tigers the defending regular season champions. The Florida State Seminoles are the defending ACC tournament Champions.

== Changes from 2016 ==
There were no coaching changes from 2016 to 2017.

== Teams ==
=== Stadiums and locations ===
Team	Stadium	Capacity
Boston College Eagles	Newton Soccer Complex	2,500
Clemson Tigers	Riggs Field	6,500
Duke Blue Devils	Koskinen Stadium	7,000
Florida State Seminoles	Seminole Soccer Complex	1,600
Louisville Cardinals	Lynn Stadium	5,300
Miami Hurricanes	Cobb Stadium	500
NC State Wolfpack	Dail Soccer Stadium	3,000
North Carolina Tar Heels	Fetzer Field	5,025
Notre Dame Fighting Irish	Alumni Stadium	2,500
Pittsburgh Panthers	Ambrose Urbanic Field	735
Syracuse Orange	SU Soccer Stadium	5,000
Virginia Cavaliers	Klöckner Stadium	8,000
Virginia Tech Hokies	Thompson Field	2,500
Wake Forest Demon Deacons	Spry Stadium	3,000

1. Georgia Tech does not sponsor women's soccer

=== Personnel ===
Team	Head coach	Captain
Boston College Eagles	(United States) Alison Foley	Allyson Swaby; Lauren Berman
Clemson Tigers	(United States) Eddie Radwanski	None Announced
Duke Blue Devils	(United States) Robbie Church	None Announced
Florida State Seminoles	(United States) Mark Krikorian	Natalia Kuikka
Louisville Cardinals	(United States) Karen Ferguson-Dayes	None Announced
Miami Hurricanes	(United States) Mary-Frances Monroe	Dejah Cason
NC State Wolfpack	(United States) Tim Santoro	None Announced
North Carolina Tar Heels	(India) Anson Dorrance	Annie Kingman; Joanna Boyles; Julia Ashley; Megan Buckingham
Notre Dame Fighting Irish	(United States) Theresa Romagnolo	Monica Flores; Ginny McGowan; Sandra Yu
Pittsburgh Panthers	(United States) Greg Miller	Taylor Price; Ashley Moreira; Emma Pozzulo
Syracuse Orange	(England) Phil Wheddon	Eva Gordon; Alana O'Neill; Courtney Brosnan
Virginia Cavaiers	(United States) Steve Swanson	Veronica Latsko; Megan Reid; Brianna Westrup
Virginia Tech Hokies	(United States) Charles Adair	None Announced
Wake Forest Demon Deacons	(United States) Tony da Luz	Maddie Huster

== Pre-season ==
=== Pre-season poll ===
The ACC women's soccer pre-season poll was determined by a vote of all 14 ACC women's soccer head coaches. The poll was voted on as teams began their pre-season training during the first week of August. The coaches also voted on a pre-season all-ACC team.

==== Pre-season coaches poll ====
1. Florida State – 186 points (8 First-Place Votes)
2. North Carolina – 172 (2)
3. Duke – 170 (1)
4. Virginia – 160 (2)
5. Notre Dame – 145 (1)
6. Clemson – 120
7. NC State – 104
8. Virginia Tech – 91
9. Wake Forest – 72
10. Boston College – 71
11. Miami – 65
12. Louisville – 63
13. Syracuse – 33
14. Pittsburgh – 18

=== Pre-Season All-ACC Team ===
Position	Player	Class	School
Goalkeeper	Cassie Miller	Senior (redshirt)	Florida State
Defender	Sam Staab	Junior	Clemson
Defender	Quinn	Senior	Duke
Defender	Natalia Kuikka	Junior	Florida State
Midfielder	Megan Connolly	Junior	Florida State
Midfielder	Sandra Yu	Senior	Notre Dame
Forward	Deyna Castellanos	Sophomore	Florida State
Forward	Jessie Scarpa	Junior	North Carolina
Forward	Bridgette Andrzejewski	Sophomore	North Carolina
Forward	Jennifer Westendorf	Sophomore	Notre Dame
Forward	Veronica Latsko	Senior	Virginia

=== Hermann Trophy Watchlist ===
The ACC had 4 women named to the Hermann Trophy watchlist prior to the season.

- Deyna Castellanos – Florida State
- Natalia Kuikka – Florida State
- Cassie Miller – Florida State
- Bridgette Andrzejewski – North Carolina

== Regular season ==
=== Rankings ===
==== United Soccer ====
Legend
Increase in ranking
Decrease in ranking
Not ranked previous week

	Pre Aug. 4	Wk 1 Aug. 22	Wk 2 Aug. 29	Wk 3 Sept. 5	Wk 4 Sept. 11	Wk 5 Sept. 19	Wk 6 Sept. 26	Wk 7 Oct. 3	Wk 8 Oct. 10	Wk 9 Oct. 17	Wk 10 Oct. 24	Wk 11 Oct. 31	Wk 12 Nov. 7	Final Dec. 5
Boston College														
Clemson	13	13	8	4	11	19	RV	RV	RV	RV	RV	RV	RV	RV
Duke	12	12	13	11	4	4	4	4	4	4	2	2	3	3
Florida State	15	6	15	13	16	23	21	16	16	18	23	RV	RV	15
Louisville														
Miami														
North Carolina	6	4	9	6	10	8	5	5	5	5	4	4	2	8
NC State		25	20	RV	RV	24	RV	RV	RV		RV	24	21	21
Notre Dame	18	24	RV	RV	NR	RV	22	RV	RV	RV	24	RV	RV	18
Pittsburgh														
Syracuse														
Virginia	11	10	3	8	5	11	15	13	14	12	10	10	12	8
Virginia Tech			RV	RV	RV									
Wake Forest			18	17	23	18	20	15	22	15	21	25	24	RV

==== Top Drawer Soccer ====
Legend
Increase in ranking
Decrease in ranking
Not ranked previous week

	Pre Aug. 1	Wk 1 Aug. 17	Wk 2 Aug. 21	Wk 3 Aug. 28	Wk 4 Sept. 4	Wk 5 Sept. 11	Wk 6 Sept. 18	Wk 7 Sept. 25	Wk 8 Oct. 2	Wk 9 Oct. 9	Wk 10 Oct. 16	Wk 11 Oct. 23	Wk 12 Oct. 30	Wk 13 Nov. 6	Wk 14 Nov. 13	Wk 15 Nov. 20	Wk 16 Nov. 27	Final Dec. 4
Boston College																		
Clemson	21	21	18	12	11	12	20											
Duke	5	5	9	9	6	3	3	4	4	4	4	2	2	5	5	3	3	3
Florida State	4	4	4	8	5	5	6	6	6	14	14	23			23	24	24	24
Louisville																		
Miami																		
North Carolina	9	9	8	13	12	14	5	5	5	5	5	4	4	2	2	11	11	11
NC State	22	22	21	18	23	22	21	RV					25	17	15	16	16	16
Notre Dame	14	14	15	15	20	RV	19	16	RV	RV		RV						
Pittsburgh																		
Syracuse																		
Virginia	19	19	17	4	8	9	14	18	18	17	13	14	11	14	12	9	9	9
Virginia Tech																		
Wake Forest				23	17	18	18	RV	16	19	10	17	18	19	18	19	19	19

=== Statistics ===
Overall season statistics can be found on the ACC's website.

=== Players of the Week ===
Week	Offensive Player of the week	Defensive of the week
August 22, 2017	Joanna Boyles, North Carolina	Katelyn McEachern, Pittsburgh
August 29, 2017	Taylor Ziemer, Virginia	Laurel Ivory, Virginia
August 29, 2017	Maddie Huster, Wake Forest	Laurel Ivory, Virginia
September 5, 2017	Emina Ekic, Louisville	Julia Ashley, North Carolina
September 12, 2017	Tziarra King, NC State	EJ Proctor, Duke
September 19, 2017	Natalie Jacobs, Notre Dame	Sydney Wooten, NC State
September 26, 2017	Dorian Bailey, North Carolina	Taylor Otto, North Carolina
October 3, 2017	Veronica Latsko, Virginia	Mandy McGlynn, Virginia Tech
October 10, 2017	Alessia Russo, North Carolina	Schuyler DeBree, Duke
October 10, 2017	Alessia Russo, North Carolina	Julia Ashley (2), North Carolina
October 17, 2017	Bayley Feist, Wake Forest	Sandy MacIver, Clemson
October 24, 2017	Jennifer Westendorf, Notre Dame	Gabby Kouzelos, Louisville
October 31, 2017	Tziarra King (2), NC State	Chelsea Burns, Duke

== Postseason ==
=== ACC tournament ===
Semifinals
1	Duke	1
4	Virginia	0
2	North Carolina	1
3	NC State	0

Final
1	Duke	0
2	North Carolina	1

=== NCAA tournament ===
The ACC had a total of 8 teams selected to the NCAA tournament. This was the second most number of teams from any conference in the tournament, behind the SEC (9). All teams were selected to host a first round match, and two teams were selected as number one seeds.

Seed	Region	School	1st round	2nd round	3rd round	Quarterfinals	Semifinals	Championship
1	Durham	Duke	W 1–0 vs. UNC Greensboro – (Durham, NC)	W 7–0 vs. Oklahoma State – (Durham, NC)	W 3–0 vs. Texas – (Durham, NC)	W 4–0 vs. Baylor – (Durham, NC)	T 0–0 ^{L, 3–4 PK}vs. UCLA – (Orlando, FL)	
1	Chapel Hill	North Carolina	W 3–0 vs. High Point – (Cary, NC)	W 1–0 vs. Colorado – (Cary, NC)	L 1–2 (OT) vs.Princeton – (Cary, NC)			
3	Chapel Hill	Virginia	W 2–0 vs. St. Francis – (Charlottesville, VA)	W 3–0 vs. Pepperdine – (Los Angeles, CA)	L 1–2 vs. UCLA – (Los Angeles, CA)			
4	Stanford	Florida State	W 5–0 vs. Ole Miss – (Tallahassee, FL)	W 2–0 vs. Arizona – Stanford, CA)	L 0–1 vs. Stanford – Stanford, CA)			
	Durham	Clemson	W 2–1 vs. Alabama – (Clemson, SC)	T 1–1 ^{L, 5–6 PK} vs. Texas – (Durham, NC)				
	Chapel Hill	NC State	W 4–1 vs. Arkansas – (Raleigh, NC)	T 1–1 ^{L, 4–5 PK} vs. Princeton – (Cary, NC)				
	Durham	Notre Dame	W 5–0 vs. IUPUI – (Notre Dame, IN)	T 2–2 ^{W, 4–1 PK} vs. Texas A&M – (College Station, TX)	L 2–3 (OT) vs. Baylor – (College Station, TX)			
	Stanford	Wake Forest	T 0–0 ^{W, 2–1 PK} vs. Georgetown – (Winston-Salem, NC)	L 0–2 vs. Penn State – (Morgantown, WV)				
		W–L (%):	7–0–1 (.938)	4–1–3 (.688)	1–4 (.200)	1–0 (1.000)	0–0–1 (.500)	0–0 (–) Total: 13–5–5 (.674)

== Awards and honors ==
=== United Soccer Coaches All-Americans ===
Six total players from the ACC were named to the United Soccer Coaches All-America teams. Two players were named to each the first, second and third team.

First Team

- Imani Dorsey, Duke
- Quinn, Duke

Second Team

- Deyna Castellanos, Florida State
- Alessia Russo, North Carolina

Third Team

- Schuyler DeBree, Duke
- Sandra Yu, Notre Dame

=== ACC Awards ===
2017 ACC Women's Soccer Individual Awards
Award	Recipient(s)
Offensive Player of the Year	Imani Dorsey – Duke
Coach of the Year	Robbie Church – Duke
Defensive Player of the Year	Schuyler DeBree – Duke
Midfielder of the Year	Quinn – Duke
Freshman of the Year	Emina Ekic – Louisville; Alessia Russo – North Carolina

2017 ACC Women's Soccer All-Conference Teams
First Team	Second Team	Third Team	All-Freshman Team
Imani Dorsey, Sr., F, Duke; Quinn, Sr., M, Duke; Kayla McCoy, Jr., F, Duke; Schuyler DeBree, Sr., D, Duke; EJ Proctor, Sr., GK, Duke; Deyna Castellanos, So., F, Florida State; Natalia Kuikka, Jr., D, Florida State; Alessia Russo, Fr., F, North Carolina; Tziarra King, So., M, NC State; Sandra Yu, GS, M, Notre Dame; Veronica Latsko, Sr., F, Virginia	Sam Staab, Jr., D, Clemson; Ella Stevens, So., F, Duke; Taylor Racioppi, Jr., F, Duke; Emina Ekic, Fr., M, Louisville; Joanna Boyles, Sr., M, North Carolina; Dorian Bailey, Jr., M, North Carolina; Julia Ashley, Jr., D, North Carolina; Natalie Jacobs, So., F, Notre Dame; Megan Reid, Sr., D, Virginia; Maddie Huster, Sr., M, Wake Forest; Lindsay Preston, Sr., GK, Wake Forest	Sam Coffey, Fr., M, Boston College; Ashton Miller, Sr., M, Duke; Gloriana Villalobos, Fr., M, Florida State; Jennifer Westendorf, So., F, Notre Dame; Ricci Walking, So., M, NC State; Bridgett Andrzejewski, So., M, North Carolina; Emily Fox, Fr., M, North Carolina; Taylor Otto, R-Fr., D, North Carolina; Courtney Brosnan, Sr., GK, Syracuse; Taryn Torres, Fr., M, Virginia; Phoebe McClernon, So., D, Virginia; Bayley Feist, Jr., M, Wake Forest	Sam Coffey, Fr., M, Boston College; Mariana Speckmaier, Fr., F, Clemson; Taylor Mitchell, Fr., D, Duke; Gloriana Villalobos, Fr., M, Florida State; Emina Ekic, Fr., M, Louisville; Alessia Russo, Fr., F, North Carolina; Emily Fox, Fr., M, North Carolina; Lulu Guttenberger, Fr., D, NC State; Sammi Fisher, Fr., M, Notre Dame; Taryn Torres, Fr., M, Virginia; Vicky Krug, Fr., D, Wake Forest

== Draft picks ==
The ACC had 12 total players selected in the 2018 NWSL College Draft. There were 3 players selected in the first round, 1 player selected in the second round, 5 players selected in the third round, and 3 players selected in the fourth round. Duke lead the way with 6 players selected, Wake Forest and North Carolina had 2 players selected each, and Virginia and Notre Dame each had 1 player selected.

FW	Forward	MF	Midfielder	DF	Defender	GK	Goalkeeper

Player	Team	Round	Pick #	Position	School
(Canada) Quinn	Washington Spirit	1st	3	MF	Duke
(United States) Imani Dorsey	Sky Blue FC	1st	5	FW	Duke
(United States) Sandra Yu	Portland Thorns FC	1st	8	MF	Notre Dame
(United States) Schuyler DeBree	Washington Spirit	2nd	12	DF	Duke
(United States) Ashton Miller	Boston Breakers	3rd	22	MF	Duke
(United States) Megan Buckingham	Chicago Red Stars	3rd	24	MF	North Carolina
(United States) Allyson Haran	Seattle Reign FC	3rd	25	DF	Wake Forest
(United States) Maddie Huster	Washington Spirit	3rd	26	MF	Wake Forest
(United States) Veronica Latsko	Houston Dash	3rd	28	FW	Virginia
(United States) Abby Elinsky	Houston Dash	3rd	30	MF	North Carolina
(United States) Joanna Boyles	Boston Breakers	4th	32	MF	North Carolina
(United States) Emma Jane Proctor	Utah Royals FC	4th	34	GK	Duke
(United States) Morgan Reid	North Carolina Courage	4th	39	DF	Duke
