= 2017 Brighton & Hove Albion W.F.C. season =

Brighton & Hove Albion
Spring Series season
- Chairman: Tony Bloom
- Manager: George Parris
- Stadium: Culver Road
- WSL 2 Spring Series: 6th
- FA Cup: Fourth round
Home colours	Away colours

The 2017 Spring Series Brighton & Hove Albion W.F.C season was a shortened one-off football season that happened between February and May 2017, designed to bridge the gap between transitioning the Women's Super League from a summer schedule to a traditional winter calendar.

The WSL Spring Series and WSL 2 Spring Series happened following the club's promotion from the 2015-16 FA Women's Premier League, when they beat Northern Division champions Sporting Club Albion in the National Premier League play-off final.

== New signings ==
Ahead of the WSL Spring Series, the club made four new signings in Alessia Russo, Emma Byrne, Laura Rafferty and Jenna Legg. Russo scored a total of three goals throughout the series including scoring the club's first professional goal since the Women's Super League was established.

== Season overview ==
- Interim manager George Parris managed the team throughout the Spring Series competition.
- Only nine league matches were played with a record of 2 wins, 4 draws and 3 losses.
- Brighton played their home fixtures at Culver Road in Lancing.
