= Alessia Russo =

English footballer (born 1999)

Alessia Russo MBE
- Russo in 2026

Personal information
- Full name: Alessia Mia Teresa Russo
- Date of birth: 8 February 1999 (age 27)
- Place of birth: Maidstone, England
- Height: 5 ft 9 in (1.75 m)
- Positions: Striker; attacking midfielder

Team information
- Current team: Arsenal
- Number: 23

Youth career
- 2007–2010: Charlton Athletic
- 2010–2016: Cliffe Woods Colts

College career
Years	Team	Apps	(Gls)
2017–2019	North Carolina Tar Heels	43	(21)

Senior career*
Years	Team	Apps	(Gls)
2016–2017	Chelsea	0	(0)
2017	Brighton & Hove Albion	7	(3)
2020–2023	Manchester United	46	(22)
2023–	Arsenal	76	(42)

International career^{‡}
2013–2014	England U15	2	(0)
2014–2016	England U17	27	(17)
2017	England U19	11	(0)
2017	England U20	7	(4)
2019	England U21	8	(0)
2020–	England	69	(33)
Medal record
Women's football
Representing England
UEFA Women's Championship
Winner	2022 England
Winner	2025 Switzerland
UEFA–CONMEBOL Finalissima
Winner	2023 England
FIFA Women's World Cup
Runner-up	2023 Australia-New Zealand
FIFA U-20 Women's World Cup
Third place	2018 France
UEFA Women's Under-17 Championship
Third place	2016 Belarus
- * Club domestic league appearances and goals as of 22 November 2026 ‡ National team caps and goals as of 13 October 2026

Alessia Mia Teresa Russo MBE (Italian: [aˈlɛssja ˈmiːa teˈrɛːza ˈrusso]; born 8 February 1999) is an English professional footballer who plays as a striker or attacking midfielder for Women's Super League club Arsenal and the England national team. She played college soccer for the North Carolina Tar Heels.

After brief stints as a teenager for Chelsea and Brighton & Hove Albion, Russo joined Manchester United in 2020. At Manchester United, Russo won awards from the club including Player of the Year and Goal of the Season, and was twice top scorer. In 2023, she joined Arsenal on a free transfer, where during the 2024–25 season, she was top scorer of the WSL (alongside Khadija Shaw), named FWA Women's Footballer of the Year and won the UEFA Women's Champions League.

Russo has represented England internationally at various youth levels, from U15 to U21, including captaining the U16 side. She made her senior debut in 2020 and scored her first goals in 2021 against Latvia, the fastest hat-trick scored in history by an England player at just 11 minutes. As a two-time Euro winner with England, Russo was awarded Goal of the Tournament and the Bronze Boot in the Euro 2022 tournament. For the 2023–24 season, she was voted England Women's Player of the Year.

== Early life ==
Born in Maidstone, Kent to Carol and Mario, Russo first played competitive football from the age of 6, playing for West Farleigh Sports Club in the under-7 boys' team. She played for Bearsted Girls U10 as a child; in 2022, as part of the "Where Greatness Is Made" campaign, a plaque honouring Russo was installed at the club. In 2006, she was a mascot for her future Manchester United manager Casey Stoney, who was captain of Charlton Athletic, while Russo was at the London club's Centre of Excellence. Russo attended the St Simon Stock Catholic School in Maidstone, where she took part in a variety of sports; as well as playing as both a midfielder and a forward in football, she undertook athletics, ran cross country, and competed in cricket and netball.

While attending St Simon Stock School, Russo played county schools' football for Kent Schools FA. She began her career at Charlton Athletic's Centre of Excellence, staying with them from 2007 to 2010, before joining and captaining Chelsea's development squad. Her first and only senior appearance with Chelsea came during the first round of the FA WSL Continental Cup on 2 July 2016.

When she was considering university, Chelsea offered her an option that would have involved several hours' travel between school and training; instead, she decided to go to the United States, where her brother Luca had already experienced a combined athletic-academic programme. She approached Mark Parsons, who had been her Chelsea academy coach and was the then-manager of the Portland Thorns, for information on universities. After one visit, she knew she wanted to attend the University of North Carolina at Chapel Hill. England teammate Lotte Wubben-Moy followed her, and the pair were roommates in their first year. Russo played football and achieved a degree with a major in sport and exercise science at North Carolina.

== College career ==
In autumn 2017, Russo moved to the United States to play college soccer, joining the ACC team North Carolina Tar Heels. As a freshman she appeared in 19 games, making 18 starts. She finished as the leading scorer on the team with nine goals as well as two assists and earned several accolades including co-ACC Freshman of the Year, ACC All-Freshman Team selection and United Soccer Coaches All-East Region first team selection. The team won the 2017 ACC Women's Soccer Tournament, beating the Duke Blue Devils 1–0 in the final, having finished runners-up to Duke in the regular season. Russo was named tournament MVP and, though having missed matches to join up with the England youth squads, ended the year with a string of personal accolades, including the university's own for best female newcomer in an athletics program.

In 2018, despite missing the postseason with a broken leg, Russo earned a United Soccer Coaches first-team All-America selection, the first Tar Heel to make the first team since Crystal Dunn in 2013, and was named ACC Offensive Player of the Year as North Carolina won the regular season title for the first time since 2008. Russo received increased personal recognition, making national rankings, and was a semi-finalist for the Hermann Trophy, awarded to the nation's best college soccer player; she was joint team lead in scoring with six goals, and North Carolina noted her tendency to score the game-winning goals during her first two years.

In 2019, Russo returned from injury to make a career-high 24 appearances and once again led the team in goals, with thirteen. The team defended the regular season title, won the 2019 ACC Women's Soccer Tournament and reached the 2019 Women's College Cup Final, losing on penalties to Stanford after a goalless draw. Individually Russo was named first-team All-ACC for the third year in a row, ACC Tournament MVP for a second time and United Soccer Coaches first team All-American for a second time, also making the Hermann Trophy semi-final list again. Continuing with her match-winning goal feats, she also provided assists for the first time in her college career, with three. In August 2020, Russo announced she was forgoing her final year of college eligibility amid uncertainty around the season due to the COVID-19 pandemic.

== Club career ==
=== Brighton & Hove Albion ===
In January 2017, Russo joined newly promoted WSL 2 side Brighton & Hove Albion ahead of the 2017 FA WSL 2 Spring Series. She made her Brighton debut on 5 February 2017 in an FA Cup third round victory against AFC Wimbledon. On 11 February, Russo scored Brighton's first ever goal at WSL level in the team's Spring Series opener, a 1–1 draw with London Bees.

=== Manchester United ===
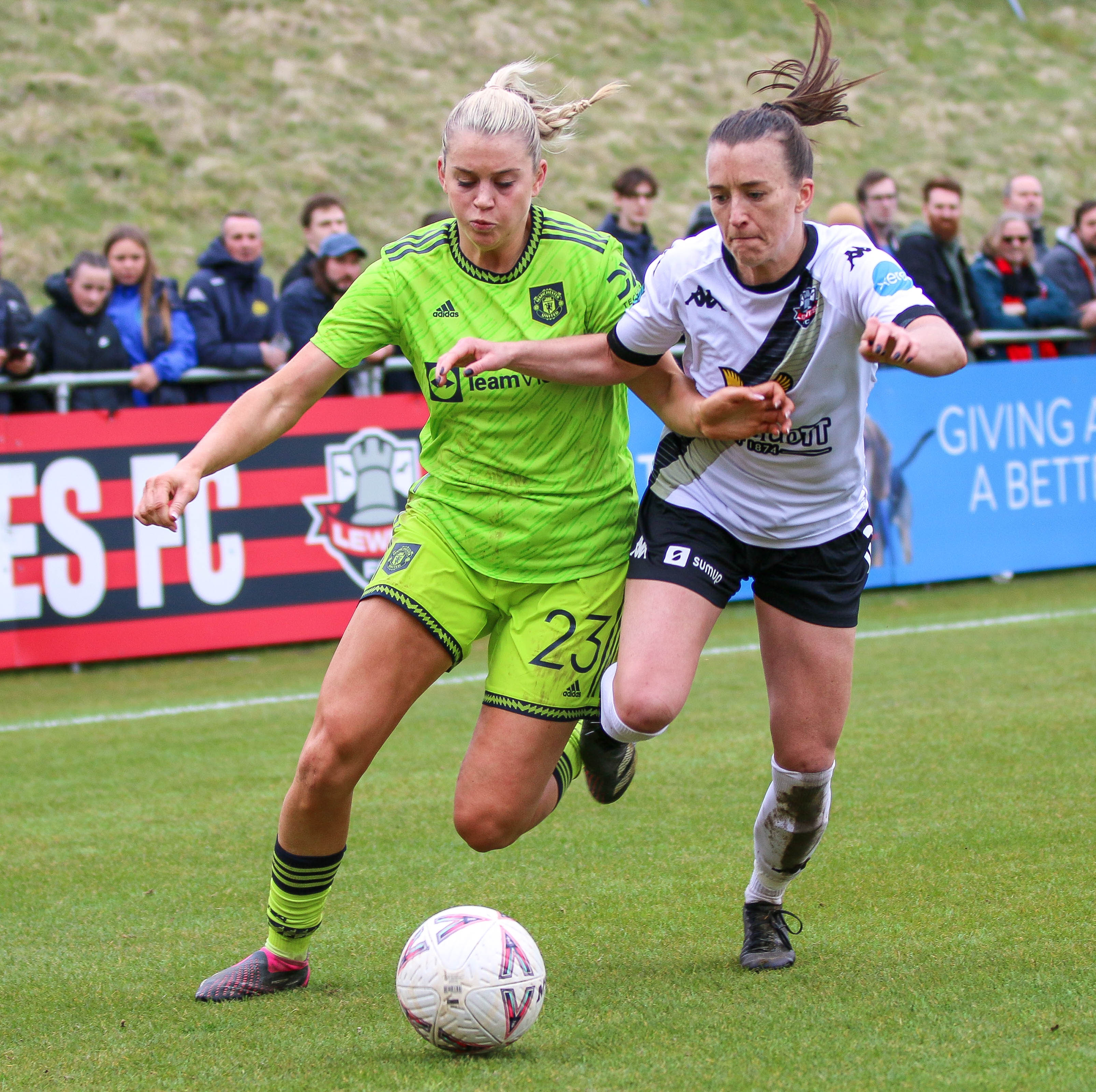
Russo (left) playing for Manchester United against Lewes in 2023.

On 10 September 2020, after finishing her collegiate career in North Carolina, Russo signed a two-year contract with the option for a third year with Manchester United, the club she grew up supporting. She made her debut three days later as a half-time substitute in a 5–2 league victory over Birmingham City, registering an assist. She scored her first goal for the club in the following game, starting in a 3–0 victory over Brighton & Hove Albion. Russo was nominated for WSL Player of the Month in October 2020 with three goals and one assist in three appearances. However, she would miss the rest of the 2020–21 season after tearing her hamstring during training.

In the 2021–22 season, Russo led the team in goals with 11 goals in 30 appearances in all competitions and was named the inaugural winner of the team's Players' Player of the Year award.

During the January 2023 transfer window, with six months left on her contract, Russo was the subject of two world record transfer bids from WSL rivals Arsenal worth more than the £400,000 Barcelona paid for Keira Walsh in September 2022. Both were rejected. On 5 March 2023, Russo scored her first hat-trick in Manchester United's 5–1 victory over Leicester City in the WSL to extend Manchester United's lead at the top of the Women's Super League. On 16 June 2023, it was announced that Russo would leave the club upon the expiry of her contract at the end of the season.

=== Arsenal ===
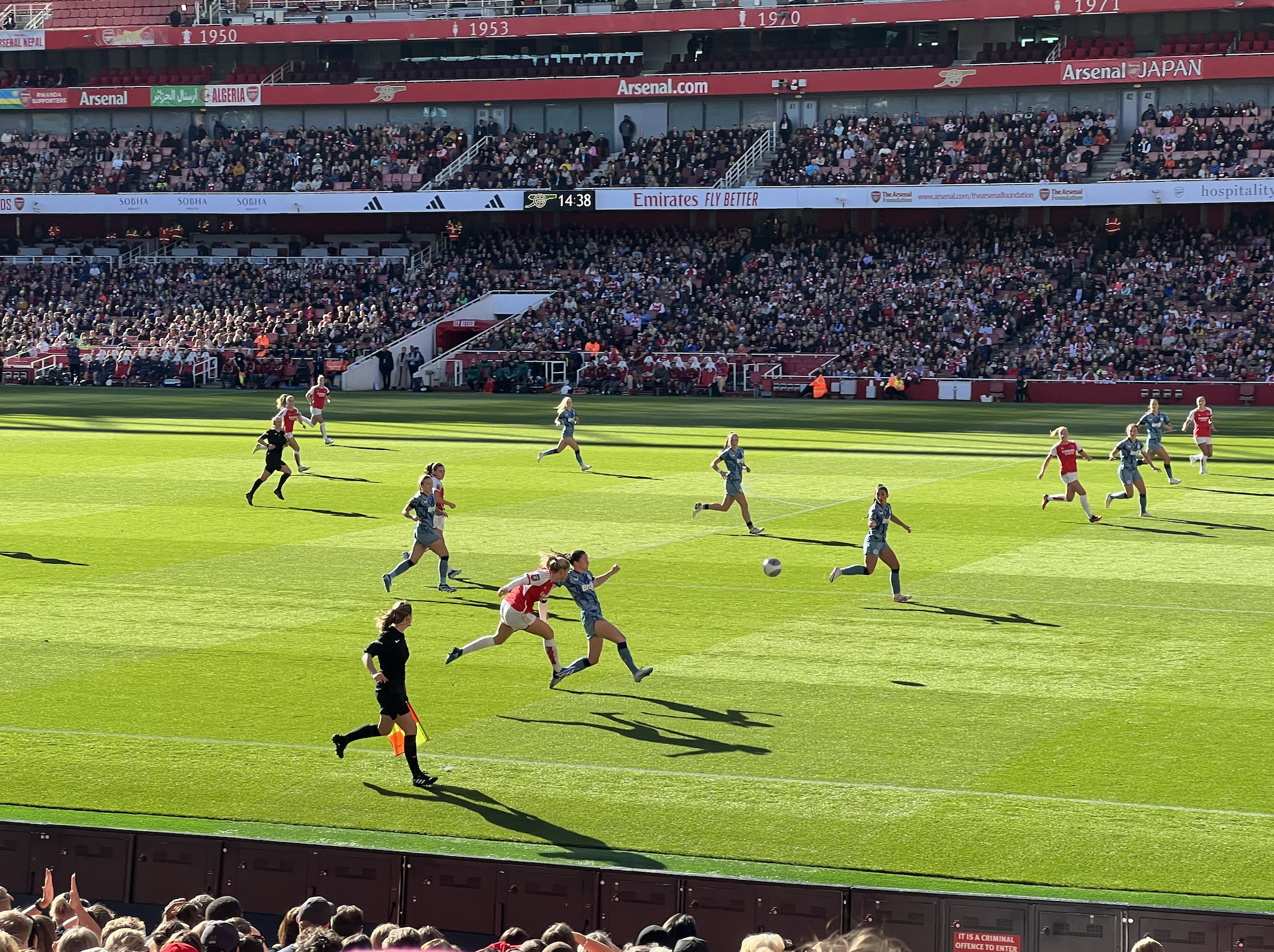
Russo in action against Aston Villa at the Emirates Stadium in October 2023.

On 4 July 2023, it was announced that Russo had signed for Arsenal on a free transfer. She made her debut for the club during their UEFA Champions League first round qualifying match against Linköping on 6 September 2023. On 9 September, she scored her first goals, a brace, during Arsenal's 3–3 draw against Paris FC in the final of the first round qualifiers, which Arsenal ultimately lost on penalties. On 15 October, Russo scored her first goal for Arsenal in the WSL, finding the net in the 94th minute of stoppage time to seal a 2–1 comeback win against Aston Villa. She scored the winner in the 1–0 victory over Tottenham Hotspur on 3 March. She scored for Arsenal in the 2024 Women's A-Leagues All Stars Game in Melbourne, Australia in a 1–0 victory.

In the 2024–25 season, Russo scored for Arsenal in four consecutive matches, including two against Aston Villa, helping to keep their unbeaten record of eight matches. At the end of the season, Russo was awarded FWA Women's Footballer of the Year for her impressive season for Arsenal, helping the team win the Champions League for the second time. After scoring 12 goals in 21 league appearances, she also shared the WSL Golden Boot award with Khadija Shaw.

On 5 September 2025, Arsenal announced that Russo had signed a new long-term deal with the club, with Russo stating that "Arsenal feels like home" and that "Playing for Arsenal is an honour, and I feel empowered with this badge on my chest." She scored a hat-trick within the first 30 minutes in a 5–2 North London derby win over Tottenham on 28 March 2026. She was named Arsenal Women's Player of the Season.

== International career ==
=== Youth ===
Russo has represented England on the under-15, under-17 and under-19, under-20, and under-21 national teams. She also played in under-16 matches, captaining this side for a game in November 2014. In October 2015, she scored five goals against Croatia during a 13–0 2016 UEFA Under-17 Championship qualification win before scoring a hat-trick against Estonia in the following game. Russo finished joint top-scorer in qualifying with 9 goals and then again at 2016 UEFA Under-17 Championship, scoring 5 goals including a brace against Germany in a 4–3 semi-final defeat as England finished third. She competed at the 2016 FIFA U-17 World Cup in Jordan and was part of the squad that finished third at the 2018 FIFA U-20 World Cup.

=== Senior ===
On 26 February 2020, Russo was called up to the senior England national team for the first time as part of the 2020 SheBelieves Cup squad, initially as a training player but was later added as an injury replacement for Lucy Bronze. She made her senior international debut on 11 March 2020 in the final game of the tournament, appearing as a 76th-minute substitute for Toni Duggan in a 1–0 defeat to Spain. On 30 November 2021, she scored her first international goals, a hat-trick in a national record 20–0 victory over Latvia during 2023 World Cup qualifying. Timed at 11 minutes, the hat-trick was the fastest by any England player in history.

External video
- Alessia Russo Goal vs Sweden, FIFA Puskas Award 2022 Nominee, Euro 2022 semi-final on 26 July, published by FIFA via YouTube, 12 January 2023.

In June 2022, Russo was included in Sarina Wiegman's England squad for UEFA Women's Euro 2022. She appeared in all six games, all as a substitute, during the campaign as England won the Euros for the first time. She ended the tournament with four goals, the fourth an audacious back-heel between the legs of Sweden keeper Hedvig Lindahl in the semi-final, described as "instantly iconic" by The Guardian. This total placed her third highest, behind her teammate Beth Mead and Germany's Alexandra Popp (six each). Her goal against Sweden was awarded "Goal of the Tournament" by UEFA and was later nominated for the 2022 FIFA Puskás Award.

On 31 May 2023, Russo was named to the squad for the 2023 FIFA World Cup in July 2023. Russo scored England's winning goal in a 2–1 quarter-final win against Colombia. In the World Cup semi-final, Russo scored England's third goal in a 3–1 win against Australia as England reached the World Cup final for the first time.

Russo scored in both the 2–1 win against France and the 2–1 win against the Republic of Ireland, helping secure England's qualification for the Euro 2025. On 22 October 2024, she was named England Women's Player of the Year for the 2023–24 season.

On 21 February 2025, Russo scored her first goal of the year, against Portugal, during their opening Nations League game, which ended in a 1–1 draw. On 3 June, she scored on her 50th appearance for England in a 2–1 Nations League defeat against Spain. Two days later, she was named in England's squad for UEFA Euro 2025. During the final, also against Spain, on 27 July, Russo scored the equalising goal in the 57th minute with England ultimately going on to win the tournament for the second consecutive time through a penalty shoot-out.

Playing in England's 2027 World Cup qualifying campaign, Russo scored in a 1–0 win over Iceland on 18 April 2026, in what was the 500th fixture played in the Lionesses' history. The goal took her into the top 10 all-time goalscorers. On 11 October 2026, it was announced that Russo had been named England player of the year as a key player in the 2025-26 campaign, featuring in all 10 games and scoring five goals.

Russo has been awarded the Legacy number 215 by The Football Association.

== Personal life ==
Russo is of part Italian descent – her Sicilian grandfather from Aragona, in the Province of Agrigento, moved to England in the 1950s. Her grandfather became a fan of Manchester United and passed this on to his children and grandchildren.

Russo's father played non-league football for Metropolitan Police and is their record goalscorer. Her middle brother, Giorgio, has played non-league football for various teams, including Ramsgate, and also appeared on the 12th series of Love Island. Giorgio's appearance on Love Island coincided with UEFA Women's Euro 2025, during which Russo watched the programme with England teammate Ella Toone while competing in Switzerland. Following his elimination, Giorgio travelled to Switzerland to support his sister, attending England's quarter-final against Sweden and semi-final against Italy. Russo's other brother, Luca, represented England in track and field at the under-20 level.

In January 2023, Russo received an honorary doctorate from Canterbury Christ Church University in recognition of her contributions to women's football. In June 2026, Russo and a number of her England teammates were awarded an MBE on King Charles's birthday honours list.

== Career statistics ==
=== College ===
Team	Season	NCAA Regular Season			ACC Tournament		NCAA Tournament		Total	
Team	Season	Division	Apps	Goals	Apps	Goals	Apps	Goals	Apps	Goals
North Carolina Tar Heels	2017	Div. I	13	8	3	1	3	0	19	9
North Carolina Tar Heels	2018	Div. I	14	6	0	0	0	0	14	6
North Carolina Tar Heels	2019	Div. I	15	6	3	3	6	4	24	13
Total			42	20	6	4	9	4	57	28

=== Club ===
As of match played 22 November 2026.

Appearances and goals by club, season and competition
Club	Season	League			FA Cup		League Cup		Europe		Other		Total	
Club	Season	Division	Apps	Goals	Apps	Goals	Apps	Goals	Apps	Goals	Apps	Goals	Apps	Goals
Chelsea	2016	WSL 1	0	0	0	0	1	0	—		—		1	0
Brighton & Hove Albion	2017	WSL 2	7	3	2	0	—		—		—		9	3
Manchester United	2020–21	Women's Super League	4	3	0	0	1	0	—		—		5	3
Manchester United	2021–22	Women's Super League	22	9	2	0	6	2	—		—		30	11
Manchester United	2022–23	Women's Super League	20	10	4	3	0	0	—		—		24	13
Manchester United	Total		46	22	6	3	7	2	—		—		59	27
Arsenal	2023–24	Women's Super League	22	12	2	1	5	1	2 (Note: Appearances in UEFA Women's Champions League)	2	—		31	16
Arsenal	2024–25	Women's Super League	21	12	3	0	2	0	15	8	—		41	20
Arsenal	2025–26	Women's Super League	22	13	3	0	1	0	12	9	2 (Note: Appearances in FIFA Women's Champions Cup)	2	40	24
Arsenal	2026–27	Women's Super League	11	5	0	0	—		5	4	—		16	9
Arsenal	Total		76	42	8	1	8	1	34	23	2	2	128	69
Career total			129	67	16	4	16	3	34	23	2	2	197	99

=== International ===
As of match played 13 October 2026

Appearances and goals by national team and year
National team	Year	Apps	Goals
England	2020	1	0
England	2021	1	3
England	2022	15	7
England	2023	17	5
England	2024	12	5
England	2025	15	7
England	2026	8	6
Total		69	33

As of match played 13 October 2026
Scores and results list England's goal tally first, score column indicates score after each Russo goal.

List of international goals scored by Alessia Russo
No.	Date	Cap	Venue	Opponent	Score	Result	Competition
1	30 November 2021	2	Keepmoat Stadium, Doncaster, England	Latvia	14–0	20–0	2023 FIFA World Cup qualifying
2	30 November 2021	2	Keepmoat Stadium, Doncaster, England	Latvia	17–0	20–0	2023 FIFA World Cup qualifying
3	30 November 2021	2	Keepmoat Stadium, Doncaster, England	Latvia	18–0	20–0	2023 FIFA World Cup qualifying
4	30 June 2022	7	Letzigrund, Zürich, Switzerland	Switzerland	1–0	4–0	Friendly
5	11 July 2022	9	Brighton Community Stadium, Brighton and Hove, England	Norway	7–0	8–0	UEFA Euro 2022
6	15 July 2022	10	St Mary's Stadium, Southampton, England	Northern Ireland	3–0	5–0	UEFA Euro 2022
7	15 July 2022	10	St Mary's Stadium, Southampton, England	Northern Ireland	4–0	5–0	UEFA Euro 2022
8	26 July 2022	12	Bramall Lane, Sheffield, England	Sweden	3–0	4–0	UEFA Euro 2022
9	3 September 2022	14	Stadion Wiener Neustadt, Wiener Neustadt, Austria	Austria	1–0	2–0	2023 FIFA World Cup qualifying
10	6 September 2022	15	Bet365 Stadium, Stoke-on-Trent, England	Luxembourg	2–0	10–0	2023 FIFA World Cup qualifying
11	16 February 2023	18	Stadium MK, Milton Keynes, England	South Korea	3–0	4–0	2023 Arnold Clark Cup
12	1 August 2023	25	Hindmarsh Stadium, Adelaide, Australia	China	1–0	6–1	2023 FIFA World Cup
13	12 August 2023	27	Stadium Australia, Sydney, Australia	Colombia	2–1	2–1	2023 FIFA World Cup
14	16 August 2023	28	Stadium Australia, Sydney, Australia	Australia	3–1	3–1	2023 FIFA World Cup
15	26 September 2023	30	Stadion Galgenwaard, Utrecht, Netherlands	Netherlands	1–1	1–2	2023–24 UEFA Nations League A
16	23 February 2024	35	Estadio Nuevo Mirador, Algeciras, Spain	Austria	1–0	7–2	Friendly
17	23 February 2024	35	Estadio Nuevo Mirador, Algeciras, Spain	Austria	4–1	7–2	Friendly
18	5 April 2024	37	Wembley Stadium, London, England	Sweden	1–0	1–1	UEFA Euro 2025 qualifying
19	4 June 2024	40	Stade Geoffroy-Guichard, Saint-Étienne, France	France	2–0	2–1	UEFA Euro 2025 qualifying
20	12 July 2024	41	Carrow Road, Norwich, England	Republic of Ireland	1–0	2–1	UEFA Euro 2025 qualifying
21	21 February 2025	47	Estádio Municipal de Portimão, Portimão, Portugal	Portugal	1–0	1–1	2025 UEFA Nations League A
22	3 June 2025	50	RCDE Stadium, Cornellà de Llobregat, Spain	Spain	1–0	1–2	2025 UEFA Nations League A
23	29 June 2025	51	King Power Stadium, Leicester, England	Jamaica	5–0	7–0	Friendly
24	13 July 2025	54	Kybunpark, St. Gallen, Switzerland	Wales	4–0	6–1	UEFA Euro 2025
25	27 July 2025	57	St. Jakob-Park, Basel, Switzerland	Spain	1–1	1–1 (a.e.t.) (3–1 p)	UEFA Euro 2025
26	29 November 2025	60	Wembley Stadium, London, England	China	8–0	8–0	Friendly
27	2 December 2025	61	St Mary's Stadium, Southampton, England	Ghana	2–0	2–0	Friendly
28	3 March 2026	62	Mardan Sports Complex, Antalya, Turkey	Ukraine	1–0	6–1	2027 FIFA World Cup qualifying
29	3 March 2026	62	Mardan Sports Complex, Antalya, Turkey	Ukraine	2–0	6–1	2027 FIFA World Cup qualifying
30	18 April 2026	65	Laugardalsvöllur, Reykjavík, Iceland	Iceland	1–0	1–0	2027 FIFA World Cup qualifying
31	9 October 2026	68	Pankritio Stadium, Heraklion, Greece	Greece	3–0	3–1	2027 FIFA World Cup qualifying play-offs
32	13 October 2026	69	King Power Stadium, Leicester, England	Greece	1–0	5–0	2027 FIFA World Cup qualifying play-offs
33	13 October 2026	69	King Power Stadium, Leicester, England	Greece	5–0	5–0	2027 FIFA World Cup qualifying play-offs

== Honours ==
North Carolina Tar Heels

- Atlantic Coast Conference regular season: 2018, 2019
- ACC Women's Soccer Tournament: 2017, 2019
- NCAA Division I College Cup runners-up: 2018, 2019

Manchester United

- Women's FA Cup runner-up: 2022–23

Arsenal

- Women's League Cup: 2023–24
- UEFA Women's Champions League: 2024–25
- FIFA Women's Champions Cup: 2026

England U17

- UEFA Under-17 Championship third place: 2016

England U20

- FIFA U-20 World Cup third place: 2018

England

- UEFA Women's Euro: 2022, 2025
- Women's Finalissima: 2023
- Arnold Clark Cup: 2022, 2023
- FIFA Women's World Cup runner-up: 2023

Individual

- UEFA Under-17 Championship Team of the Tournament: 2016
- UEFA Under-17 Championship Top Scorer: 2016
- UEFA Under-17 Championship qualification Top Scorer: 2016
- ACC Freshman of the Year: 2017
- ACC Offensive Player of the Year: 2018
- United Soccer Coaches NCAA Division I first team All-America: 2018, 2019
- FA Women's Super League Goal of the Month: November 2021, December 2024
- FA Women's Super League Player of the Month: March 2022, April 2024, December 2024 March 2026
- PFA WSL Team of the Year: 2024–25, 2025–26
- PFA Fans' Player of the Month: November 2022
- Manchester United Women's Players' Player of the Year: 2021–22
- Manchester United Women's Player of the Year: 2022–23
- Manchester United Women's Goal of the Season: 2022–23 (vs. Arsenal, 19 November 2022)
- UEFA Women's Championship Bronze Boot: 2022
- UEFA Women's Championship Goal of the Tournament: 2022
- UEFA Women's Championship Team of the Tournament: 2025
- Freedom of the City of London (announced 1 August 2022)
- Women's Football Awards Player of the Year: 2023
- FIFA FIFPRO Women's World 11: 2023
- Arsenal Women's Player of the Month: April 2024, December 2024, February 2025, March 2025
- Arsenal Women's Player of the Season: 2025–26
- England Women's Player of the Year: 2023–242025–26
- England Women's Top Goalscorer: 2023–24
- FA Women's Super League Golden Boot: 2024–25
- FWA Women's Footballer of the Year: 2024–25
- UEFA Women's Champions League Team of the Season: 2024–25, 2025–26
