= 2017 Clemson Tigers women's soccer team =

American college soccer season

2017 Clemson Tigers women's soccer

Hoosier Challenge Cup Champions

NCAA Tournament, Second Round
- Conference: Atlantic Coast Conference
- Record: 10–5–4 (3–4–3 ACC)
- Head coach: Eddie Radwanski (7th season)
- Assistant coaches: Jeff Robbins (7th season); Siri Mullinix (7th season)
- Home stadium: Riggs Field

2017 ACC women's soccer standings
	Conf.						Overall
Team	W		L		T	PCT	W		L		T	PCT
No. 3 Duke ‍†‍‍^{y}	10	–	0	–	0	1.000	23	–	2	–	1	.904
#8 North Carolina ‡^{y} ‍‍‍	8	–	0	–	2	.900	17	–	3	–	2	.818
No. 21 NC State ‍‍‍^{y}	6	–	3	–	1	.650	15	–	5	–	2	.727
No. 9 Virginia ‍‍‍^{y}	5	–	2	–	3	.650	13	–	7	–	4	.625
Wake Forest ‍‍‍^{y}	5	–	3	–	2	.600	11	–	7	–	4	.591
No. 18 Notre Dame ‍‍‍^{y}	5	–	3	–	2	.600	9	–	8	–	5	.523
No. 15 Florida State ‍‍‍^{y}	5	–	4	–	1	.550	13	–	7	–	1	.643
Boston College ‍‍‍	4	–	5	–	1	.450	10	–	9	–	1	.525
Clemson ‍‍‍^{y}	3	–	4	–	3	.450	10	–	5	–	4	.632
Louisville ‍‍‍	3	–	5	–	2	.400	9	–	7	–	2	.556
Syracuse ‍‍‍	2	–	6	–	1	.278	7	–	8	–	2	.471
Virginia Tech ‍‍‍	1	–	5	–	3	.278	7	–	6	–	5	.528
Miami ‍‍‍	1	–	9	–	0	.100	5	–	11	–	0	.313
Pittsburgh ‍‍‍	0	–	9	–	1	.050	3	–	12	–	3	.250
† – Conference champion ‡ – 2017 ACC Tournament champion y – Invited to the NCAA Tournament; As of December 7, 2017; Rankings from United Soccer Coaches Poll; Source: The ACC

The 2017 Clemson Tigers women's soccer team represented Clemson University during the 2017 NCAA Division I women's soccer season. The Tigers were led by head coach Ed Radwanski, in his seventh season. Home games were played at Riggs Field.

== Roster ==
Updated September 5, 2017

Note: Flags indicate national team as defined under FIFA eligibility rules; some limited exceptions apply. Players may hold more than one non-FIFA nationality.

No.	Pos.	Nation	Player
1	GK	ENG	Sandy MacIver
2	FW	USA	Miranda Weslake
3	MF	USA	Mackenzie Smith
4	DF	USA	Alex Nillen
5	DF	USA	Cyan Mercer
6	MF	USA	Lauren Harkes
7	MF	USA	Shannon Horgan
8	MF	USA	Haley Schueppert
9	MF	USA	Audrey Viso
10	FW	USA	Alana Hockenhull
11	MF	USA	Kimber Haley
12	MF	USA	Sarah Osborne
13	MF	USA	Dani Antieau

No.	Pos.	Nation	Player
14	DF	USA	Abigail Mitchell
15	DF	USA	Sam Staab
16	MF	USA	Julie Mackin
17	FW	VEN	Mariana Speckmaier
18	MF	USA	Jeni Erickson
19	MF	USA	Jenna Polonsky
20	FW	USA	Courtney Jones
22	MF	USA	Ellen Colborn
24	GK	USA	Maddie Weber
25	DF	USA	Rachele Manfre
26	GK	USA	Melanie Stiles
30	FW	USA	Patrice DiPasquale

== Coaching staff ==
Position	Staff
Athletic director	(United States) Dan Radakovich
Head coach	(United States) Eddie Radwanski
Assistant coach	(United States) Siri Mullinix
Assistant coach	(United States) Jeff Robbins
Director of Operations	(Puerto Rico) Manuel Garcia-Oronoz

== Preseason ==
The Tigers had one player, Sam Stabb, selected to the preseason All-ACC team. The Tigers were ranked 6th in the pre-season ACC Coaches poll. The Tigers opened the season ranked 13th in the United Soccer Coaches' Poll and 21st in the Top Drawer Soccer Pre-Season poll. These rankings come despite the fact Clemson lost 12 letter winners, and returns only three starters from the 2016 team that finished the regular season tied for first in the ACC and advanced to the Sweet 16 of the NCAA tournament.

== Regular season ==
The Tigers started the regular season by recording two victories in the Hoosier Challenge Cup. These two victories were enough to crown the Tigers champions of this opening season tournament. Kimber Haley and Sam Stabb were named to the all tournament team. In the first game of the tournament, Mariana Speckmaier scored a hat trick, becoming the 15th player in Tigers history to score a hat trick, 8th Freshman to complete that feat and the second to score a hat trick in their debut. The win over SIUE was also coach Eddie Radwanski's 200th career coaching win. The Tigers continued their winning ways beating Indiana 1–0 to become Hoosier Challenge Cup Champions. Upon returning home, Clemson won its first ranked match-up of the season against #20 Auburn on August 25. The Tigers continued by winning their next three games vs. UNC Greensboro, VCU, and Georgia. From there the Tigers went on a 3-game losing streak. At the start of this streak, the team reached a season high #4 ranking in the coaches poll, but dropped games to the #7 team, University of South Carolina, Notre Dame, and the #8 team North Carolina. The Tigers then drew at Syracuse to end the skid. The Tigers only managed two goals in these four games after scoring 14 goals in their first 6 matches. The Tigers finished a three-game road trip with a win in Miami. Upon their return home, they lost to Louisville and beat Virginia Tech. The Tigers were back on the road and earned a draw at No. 14 Virginia. In the final three games of the season, Clemson lost to North Carolina State, beat #15 Wake Forest, and drew with #23 Florida State. This run saw them finish 9th in the conference, one spot out of making the 2017 ACC Women's Soccer Tournament. The top 8 teams in the conference are invited to the tournament.

== Postseason ==
On November 6, the Tigers were selected to participate in the NCAA Tournament. The Tigers were drawn to host Alabama on November 10 at Riggs Field. The Tigers scored two late goals to advance past the Crimson Tide 2–1. This win earned the Tigers a match with the #18 team in the country, Texas. This match was to be played in Durham, North Carolina. The Tigers again used a late goal to force overtime. After two periods of scoreless overtime, the match when to penalty kicks. However, Clemson came up short and lost the shootout 5–6.

== Schedule ==
Date Time, TV	Rank^{#}	Opponent^{#}	Result	Record	Site City, State
Exhibition
August 8*; 6:00 pm	No. 13	Air Force	W 4–2	– (–)	Riggs Field (–); Clemson, SC
August 11*; 6:00 pm	No. 13	No. 12 Duke	L 1–2	– (–)	Riggs Field (–); Clemson, SC
Non-conference regular season
August 18*; 4:30 pm	No. 13	at SIU Edwardsville; Hoosier Challenge Cup	W 4–0	1–0–0 (0–0–0)	Bill Armstrong Stadium (83); Bloomington, IN
August 20*; 1:30 pm	No. 13	at Indiana; Hoosier Challenge Cup	W 1–0	2–0–0 (0–0–0)	Bill Armstrong Stadium; Bloomington, IN
August 25*; 7:30 pm	No. 13	No. 20 Auburn	W 2–1 ^{2OT}	3–0–0 (0–0–0)	Riggs Field (2,237); Clemson, SC
August 27*; 6:00 pm	No. 13	at UNC Greensboro	W 4–0	4–0–0 (0–0–0)	UNCG Soccer Stadium (558); Greensboro, NC
September 1*; 5:00 pm	No. 8	VCU; First Friday	W 1–0	5–0–0 (0–0–0)	Riggs Field (1,127); Clemson, SC
September 3*; 6:00 pm	No. 8	at Georgia	W 2–0	6–0–0 (0–0–0)	Turner Soccer Complex (2,457); Athens, GA
September 8*; 7:00 pm	No. 4	No. 7 South Carolina; Rivalry	L 0–1	6–1–0 (0–0–0)	Riggs Field (3,892); Clemson, South Carolina
Conference Regular season
September 16; 7:00 pm	No. 11	Notre Dame	L 2–4	6–2–0 (0–1–0)	Riggs Field (550); Clemson, SC
September 21; 6:00 pm	No. 19	at No. 8 North Carolina	L 0–1	6–3–0 (0–2–0)	WakeMed Soccer Park (1,331); Cary, NC
September 24; 1:00 pm	No. 19	at Syracuse	T 0–0 ^{2OT}	6–3–1 (0–2–1)	SU Soccer Stadium (402); Syracuse, NY
September 29; 7:00 pm		at Miami	W 1–0	7–3–1 (1–2–1)	Cobb Stadium (425); Coral Gables, FL
October 5; 7:00 pm		Louisville	L 1–2	7–4–1 (1–3–1)	Riggs Field (820); Clemson, SC
October 8; 1:00 pm		Virginia Tech	W 3–0	8–4–1 (2–3–1)	Riggs Field (642); Clemson, SC
October 14; 7:00 pm		at No. 14 Virginia	T 0–0 ^{2OT}	8–4–2 (2–3–2)	Klöckner Stadium (2,596); Charlottseville, VA
October 19; 7:00 pm		at NC State	L 0–1	8–5–2 (2–4–2)	Dali Soccer Field (578); Raleigh, NC
October 22; 1:00 pm		No. 15 Wake Forest; Senior Day	W 2–1	9–5–2 (3–4–2)	Riggs Field (958); Clemson, South Carolina
October 26; 7:00 pm		No. 23 Florida State	T 2–2 ^{2OT}	9–5–3 (3–4–3)	Riggs Field (931); Clemson, South Carolina
NCAA tournament
November 10*; 7:00 pm		Alabama; NCAA First Round	W 2–1	10–5–3	Riggs Field (358); Clemson, SC
November 17*; 7:00 pm		at No. 18 Texas; NCAA Second Round	T 1–1 (5–6 PK) ^{2OT}	10–5–4	Koskinen Stadium (812); Durham, NC
*Non-conference game. ^{#}Rankings from United Soccer Coaches. (#) Tournament seedings in parentheses.

== Goals Record ==
Rank	No.	Nat.	Po.	Name	Regular season	NCAA Tournament	Total
1	19	(United States)	MF	Jenna Polonsky	7	0	7
1	17	(Venezuela)	FW	Mariana Speckmaier	6	1	7
3	18	(United States)	MF	Jenni Erickson	4	0	4
4	2	(United States)	FW	Miranda Westlake	2	0	2
4	3	(United States)	MF	Mackenzie Smith	2	0	2
4	7	(United States)	MF	Shannon Horgan	2	0	2
4	13	(United States)	MF	Dani Antieau	1	1	2
4	30	(United States)	FW	Patrice DiPasquale	1	1	2
Total					25	3	28

== Disciplinary record ==
Rank	No.	Nat.	Po.	Name	Regular Season			NCAA Tournament			Total		
Rank	No.	Nat.	Po.	Name	Booked	(yellow card) (yellow-red card)	Sent off (straight red)	Booked	(yellow card) (yellow-red card)	Sent off (straight red)	Booked	(yellow card) (yellow-red card)	Sent off (straight red)
1	7	(United States)	MF	Shannon Horgan	1	0	0	1	0	0	2	0	0
1	16	(United States)	MF	Julie Mackin	2	0	0	0	0	0	2	0	0
1	17	(Venezuela)	FW	Mariana Speckmaier	1	0	0	1	0	0	2	0	0
4	3	(United States)	MF	Mackenzie Smith	1	0	0	0	0	0	1	0	0
4	4	(United States)	DF	Alex Nillen	1	0	0	0	0	0	1	0	0
4	11	(United States)	MF	Kimber Haley	1	0	0	0	0	0	1	0	0
4	15	(United States)	DF	Sam Stabb	1	0	0	0	0	0	1	0	0
4	18	(United States)	MF	Jenni Erickson	1	0	0	0	0	0	1	0	0
4	19	(United States)	MF	Jenna Polonsky	1	0	0	0	0	0	1	0	0
Total					10	0	0	2	0	0	12	0	0

== Awards and honors ==
Recipient	Award	Date	Ref.
Sandy MacIver	ACC Defensive Player of the Week	October 17	
Sam Staab	All-ACC Second Team	November 2	
Mariana Speckmaier	ACC All Freshman Team	November 2	

== Rankings ==
Ranking movements Legend: ██ Increase in ranking ██ Decrease in ranking RV = Received votes
	Week																
Poll	Pre	1	2	3	4	5	6	7	8	9	10	11	12	13	14	15	Final
United Soccer	13	13	8	4	11	19	RV	RV	RV	RV	RV	RV	RV	Not released			RV
TopDrawer Soccer	21	21	18	12	11	12	20										
