= Alana O'Neill =

American soccer player

Personal information
- Full name: Alana Nicole O´Neill
- Date of birth: July 13, 1996 (age 30)
- Place of birth: Chester, New York, U.S.
- Height: 1.72 m (5 ft 8 in)
- Position: Defender

Team information
- Current team: FC Zürich Frauen
- Number: 3

College career
Years	Team	Apps	(Gls)
2014–2017	Syracuse Orange	73	(7)

Senior career*
Years	Team	Apps	(Gls)
2019	Lugano	5	(0)
2020	Benfica	0	(0)
2021–	Zürich	0	(0)
- * Club domestic league appearances and goals as of August 7, 2021 ‡ National team caps and goals as of January 15, 2020

Alana Nicole O'Neill (born July 13, 1996) is an American soccer player who plays for Swiss club FC Zürich Frauen as a defender.

O'Neill played for the Syracuse Orange women's soccer team representing Syracuse University from 2014–2017.
