= Schuyler DeBree =

American soccer player

Schulyer DeBree
Personal information
- Full name: Schuyler Hesseltine DeBree
- Date of birth: September 5, 1996 (age 30)
- Place of birth: Charlotte, North Carolina, United States
- Height: 5 ft 8 in (1.72 m)
- Position: Defender

Youth career
- PDA Slammers

College career
Years	Team	Apps	(Gls)
2014–2017	Duke Blue Devils	78	(0)

Senior career*
Years	Team	Apps	(Gls)
2015	Washington Spirit (Reserves)	10	(0)
2018	Washington Spirit	0	(0)
2018–2019	AC Sparta Prague		
2019	Reign FC	0	(0)
2021	North Carolina Courage	0	(0)

International career
2018–2019	United States U23		
- * Club domestic league appearances and goals as of April 10, 2021

Schuyler Hesseltine DeBree (born September 5, 1996) is an American former professional soccer player.

== Early life ==
Born in Charlotte, North Carolina, DeBree moved with her family to Fair Haven, New Jersey, where she played prep soccer at Rumson-Fair Haven Regional High School. During her four seasons with the Rumson-Fair Haven Bulldogs, DeBree scored 46 goals and captained her side during her senior year. She ended her high school ranked by topdrawersoccer.com as the 133 ranked player for the 2014 class and ranked 10 in the regional New Jersey class. She was also named as the Asbury Park Press All-Shore Girls Player of the Year after her senior year.

Prior to graduating, DeBree enrolled at Duke University and committed to playing college soccer for the Duke Blue Devils. During her freshman year, DeBree started all 18 matches for the Blue Devils, helping the side to six cleansheets. Prior to her sophomore year, DeBree joined the reserve side of National Women's Soccer League club Washington Spirit and played 10 matches as she helped the side to the 2015 W-League title. During her sophomore year, DeBree played 11 matches before being sidelined for the rest of the season following an ACL tear on September 24, 2015, against the Boston College Eagles. DeBree returned to the side for her junior year, starting 23 matches and being selected into the All-ACC Academic Team. For her senior season, DeBree started in all 26 matches as she helped the Blue Devils earn a team record 18 cleansheets and led her side to the 2017 Women's College Cup. Following her senior season, DeBree was awarded as the ACC Defender of the Year.

== Career ==
On January 18, 2018, DeBree was selected with the first pick of the second round in the NWSL College Draft (11th overall) by former club Washington Spirit. Despite being drafted, DeBree elected to finish her senior year at Duke University before joining the Washington Spirit training sessions midseason. Despite being told that there were no more roster spots, DeBree continued to train with the Spirit and was eventually signed to a short temporary contract. When she decided to move abroad, DeBree stated that coach Jim Gabarra told her "Oh, that's awkward. You have a full contract in your email inbox. So, I guess just delete it?".

After leaving the Spirit, DeBree moved to the Czech Republic and joined Czech Women's First League club AC Sparta Prague. Despite initially struggling, DeBree soon adjusted thanks to her former Blue Devils teammate Ashton Miller also playing with Sparta Prague. During her one season with Sparta Prague, DeBree helped the side win the Czech Women's First League title and Czech Women's Cup.

On July 15, 2019, DeBree returned to the United States and signed with Reign FC. She appeared two times for the club on the bench before leaving following the 2019 season, requesting a leave of absence.

=== North Carolina Courage ===
On March 24, 2021, after spending a year out of the game, DeBree joined the North Carolina Courage. She made her professional debut for the club on April 10, 2021, in the NWSL Challenge Cup against her former club Washington Spirit.

On November 16, 2021, DeBree announced her retirement from professional soccer.

== Career statistics ==
As of match played April 10, 2021

Appearances and goals by club, season and competition
Club	Season	League			Cup		Continental		Total	
Club	Season	Division	Apps	Goals	Apps	Goals	Apps	Goals	Apps	Goals
North Carolina Courage	2021	National Women's Soccer League	0	0	1	0	—	—	1	0
Career total			0	0	1	0	0	0	1	0

== Honors ==
Duke Blue Devils

- Atlantic Coast Conference: 2017

Sparta Prague

- Czech Women's First League: 2018–19
- Czech Women's Cup: 2019

Individual

- 2017 ACC Defensive Player of the Season
