= Player escort =

Child accompanying a footballer onto the pitch

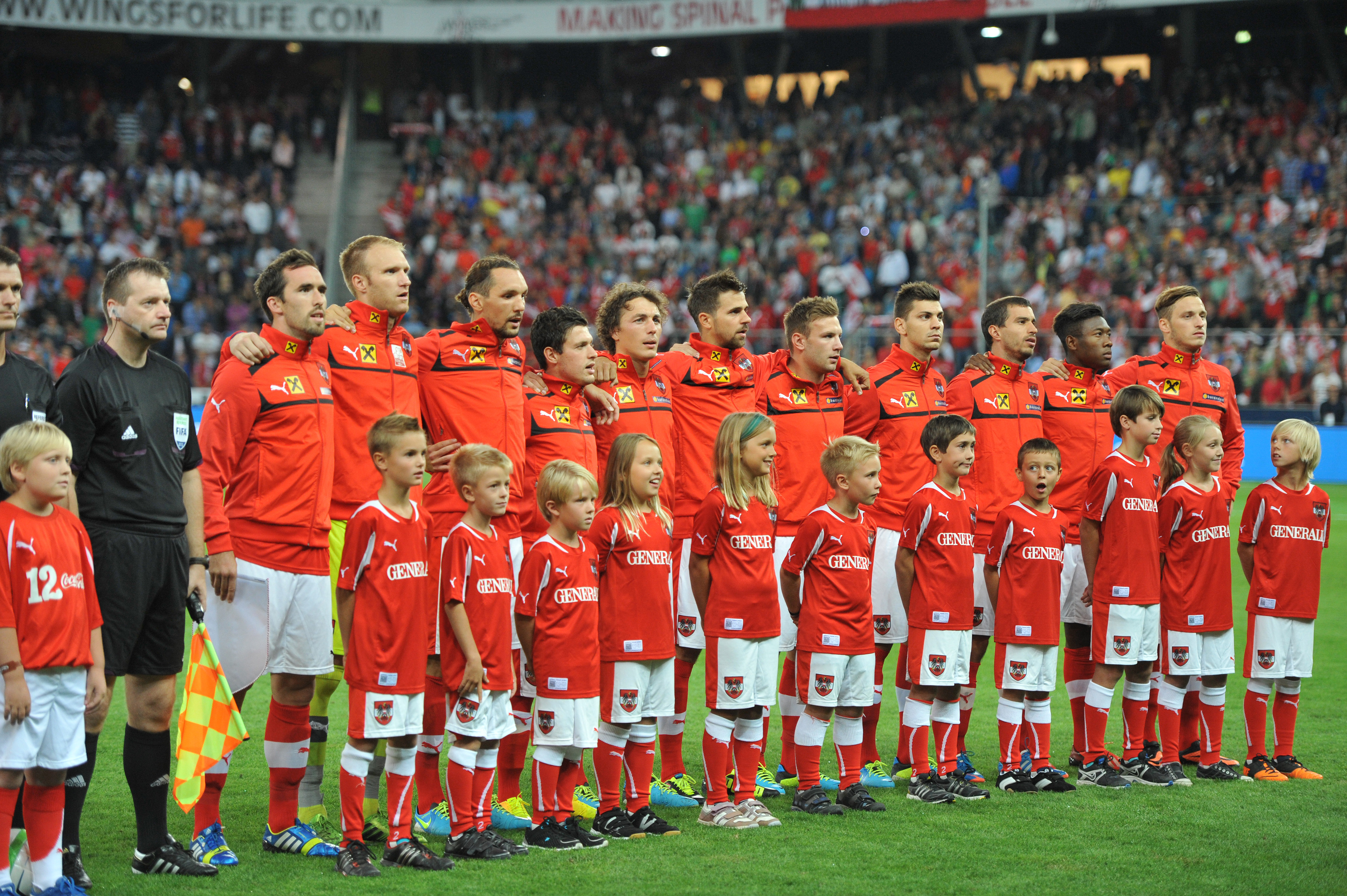
Player escorts with the Austrian national team before a friendly against Greece in 2013.

Player escort (also called match mascot or child mascot) is a child who accompanies a football player entering the pitch. Player escorts hold hands with the footballer while they walk in and stay with the player during the playing of the national anthem. The children are usually between 6 and 18 years old. In addition to assisting players, they often have duties such as carrying flags, helping the sideline ball crew and playing matches with each other. However today there are various reasons why players walk in with children. These include promoting children's rights campaigns, bringing the element of innocence to the game, fulfilling children's dreams or making profit off it, and reminding players that children are looking up to them. It also deters hooliganism or other forms of violence, as fans would be less likely to throw anything at players if they were with children.

== History ==
This tradition emerged in Brazil, in the 1970s. The idea came from Ronan Ramos Oliveira, who at the time was public relations director at Clube Atlético Mineiro. On September 5, 1976, in a match between the clubs Atlético Mineiro and América Mineiro, he suggested that children go to the field with the team's players. At the beginning, the selected children had to be lookalikes of a player. The action was also a strategy for more families to start attending the games.

The UEFA Euro 2000 was one of the first major events where player escorts appeared with every footballer, replacing the previous practice where the players on the team linked arms with each other. In club games children are usually members of youth teams or contest winners. Since 2002, World Cup or European Championship escorts are selected in a competition hosted by McDonald's and Lidl (for UEFA EURO 2024), sponsor of the event.

Being a child mascot may or may not be free. Among FA Premier League clubs, some may charge £350-£600 depending on the fixture while others offer some free places through competitions and charities, and other clubs do not have a charge at all.

On some occasions, there can be special escorts. For example, Ajax players walked out with their mothers on Mother's Day and São Paulo FC players walked out with dogs to promote the adoption of stray dogs within São Paulo. Some famous players like Wayne Rooney used to be player escorts in their childhood.
