= Bayley Feist =

American soccer player (born 1997)

- Feist with the Kansas City Current in 2026

Personal information
- Full name: Bayley Elizabeth Feist
- Date of birth: March 14, 1997 (age 29)
- Place of birth: Cincinnati, Ohio, United States
- Height: 5 ft 6 in (1.68 m)
- Position: Midfielder

Team information
- Current team: Kansas City Current
- Number: 22

College career
Years	Team	Apps	(Gls)
2015–2018	Wake Forest Demon Deacons	78	(22)

Senior career*
Years	Team	Apps	(Gls)
2019–2023	Washington Spirit	38	(1)
2024–	Kansas City Current	46	(1)
- * Club domestic league appearances and goals as of 16:48, November 14, 2026 (UTC)

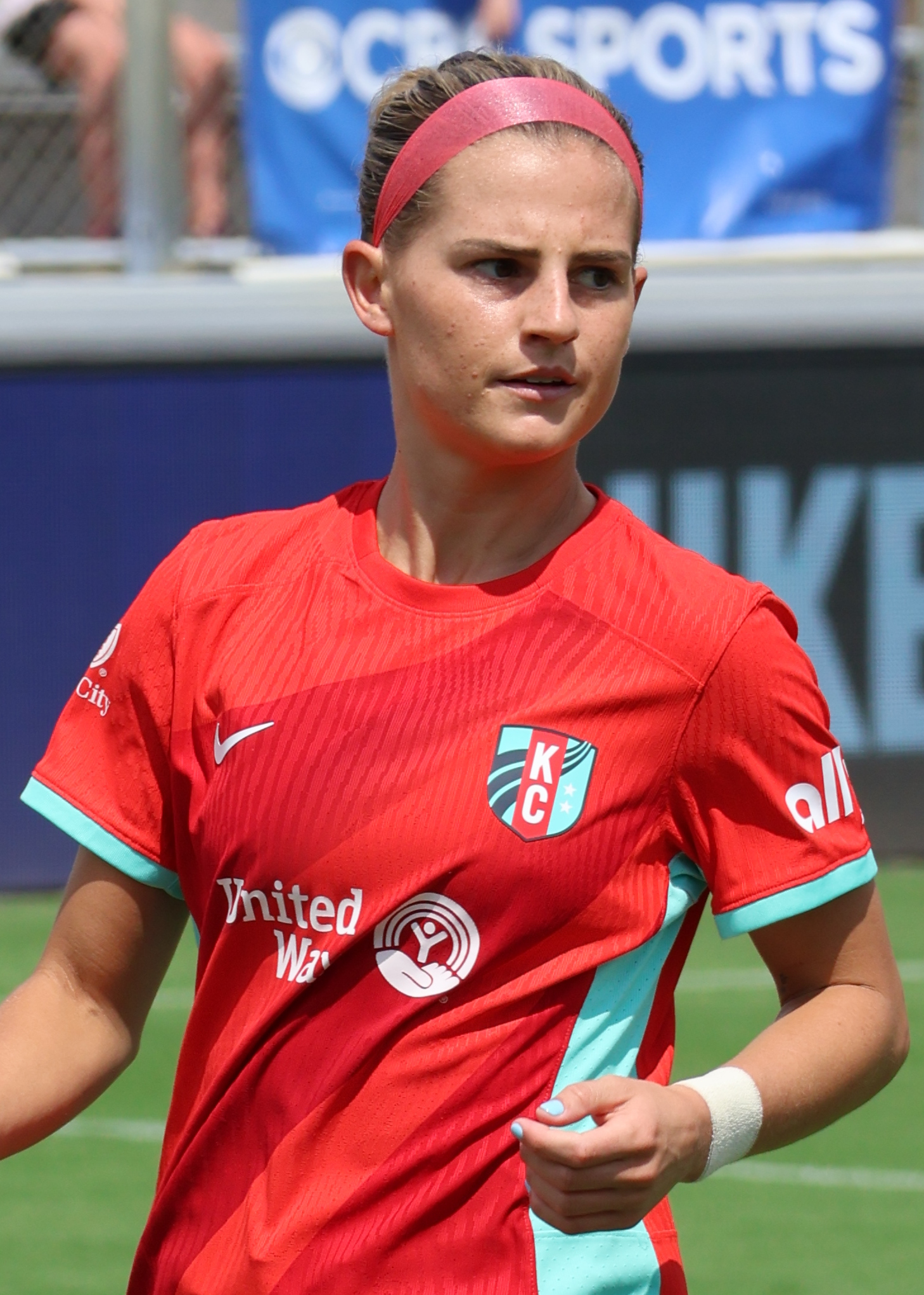
Feist with the Kansas City Current in 2024

Bayley Elizabeth Feist (born March 14, 1997) is an American professional soccer player who plays as a midfielder for the Kansas City Current of the National Women's Soccer League (NWSL). She played college soccer for the Wake Forest Demon Deacons and was drafted by the Washington Spirit in the second round of the 2019 NWSL College Draft.

== Early life ==
=== Wake Forest Demon Deacons ===
Feist attended Wake Forest University, where she played for the Demon Deacons women's soccer team from 2015 to 2018. Starting in all games after her sophomore year, Feist made the All-ACC Third Team in 2017 and the All-ACC Second Team in 2018. At the time of her graduation, her 22 career goals were tied for 10th-most in school history.

== Club career ==
=== Washington Spirit, 2019–2023 ===
Feist was drafted 17th overall in the second round of the 2019 NWSL College Draft by the Washington Spirit. She was signed to the Spirit's supplemental roster in April before the start of the season. On May 4, 2019, she made her professional debut as an 80th-minute substitute in a 0–0 draw against Reign FC.

Feist became a regular starter for the Spirit in 2020. After the NWSL regular season was cancelled due to the COVID-19 pandemic, the Spirit played in the NWSL Challenge Cup and the NWSL Fall Series. She was named the Spirit's Player of the Year following the season. On October 28, 2020, she re-signed with the Spirit on a two-year contract with the option for another year.

In April 2021, the Spirit announced that Feist had torn her anterior cruciate ligament (ACL) and she missed the entire season.

=== Kansas City Current, 2024– ===
On January 22, 2024, Feist signed a two-year contract with the Kansas City Current. On February 3, 2026, she re-signed with the Current on a one-year deal.

== Honors and awards ==
Washington Spirit

- NWSL Championship: 2021

Kansas City Current

- NWSL Championship: 2026
- NWSL Shield: 2025
- NWSL x Liga MX Femenil Summer Cup: 2024

Individual

- Washington Spirit Player of the Year: 2020
- Second-team All-ACC: 2018
- Third-team All-ACC: 2017
