= 2017 NCAA Division I women's soccer rankings =

- Season: 2017
- NCAA tournament: 2017
- Preseason No. 1: West Virginia (United Soccer Coaches); Penn State (Soccer America); Stanford (Top Drawer Soccer)
- NCAA Tournament Champions: Stanford
NCAA Division I women's soccer rankings


Three polls make up the 2017 NCAA Division I women's soccer rankings, the United Soccer Coaches Poll, the Soccer America Poll, and the Top Drawer Soccer Poll. They represent the ranking system for the 2017 NCAA Division I women's soccer season.

== Legend ==
	Increase in ranking
	Decrease in ranking
	Not ranked previous week
Italics	Number of first place votes
(#–#–#)	Win–loss–tie record
т	Tied with team above or below also with this symbol

== United Soccer Coaches ==
	Preseason Aug. 4	Week 1 Aug. 22	Week 2 Aug. 29	Week 3 Sept. 5	Week 4 Sept. 12	Week 5 Sept. 19	Week 6 Sept. 26	Week 7 Oct. 3	Week 8 Oct. 10	Week 9 Oct. 17	Week 10 Oct. 24	Week 11 Oct. 31	Week 12 Nov. 7	Final Dec. 5	
1.	West Virginia	West Virginia (16) (1-0-0)	UCLA (12) (4-0-0)	UCLA (26) (6-0-0)	UCLA (28) (7-0-0)	UCLA (7-0-1) (22)	UCLA (8-0-1) (22)	UCLA (10-0-1) (22)	Stanford (12-1-0) (16)	Stanford (13-1-0) (26)	Stanford (15-1-0) (27)	Stanford (17-1-0) (28)	Stanford (18-1-0) (28)	Stanford (23-1-0) (27)	1.
2.	Stanford	Stanford (9) (2-0-0)	Florida (9) (4-0-0)	Stanford (3) (4-1-0)	Stanford (2) (6-1-0)	Stanford (7-1-0) (6)	Stanford (8-1-0) (5)	Stanford (10-1-0) (4)	UCLA (11-0-2) (12)	UCLA (12-0-2) (3)	Duke (16-1-0) (1)	Duke (18-1-0) (2)	North Carolina (15-2-2) (2)	UCLA (19-3-3) (1)	2.
3.	USC	South Carolina (1) (2-0-0)	Virginia (2) (3-0-0)	West Virginia (2) (3-1-0)	South Carolina (6-1-0)	South Carolina (7-1-0) (3)	South Carolina (9-1-0) (4)	South Carolina (10-1-0) (4)	South Carolina (12-1-0) (2)	South Carolina (13-1-0) (2)	South Carolina (14-1-1)	South Carolina (15-1-1) (1)	Duke (19-2-0) (1)	Duke (22-2-1) (3)	3.
4.	South Carolina	North Carolina (2) (2-0-0)	Penn State (6) (3-0-0)	Clemson (6-0-0)	Duke (7-1-0)	Duke (8-1-0)	Duke (10-1-0)	Duke (11-1-0)	Duke (13-1-0)	Duke (14-1-0)	North Carolina (12-2-1) (2)	North Carolina (13-2-2)	UCLA (15-2-2)	South Carolina (18-3-1)	4.
5.	Georgetown	USC (1-0-0)	Stanford (2-1-0)	Penn State (3-1-0)	Virginia (5-2-0)	West Virginia (7-2-0)	North Carolina (7-2-0)	North Carolina (8-2-0)	North Carolina (10-2-0)	North Carolina (11-2-0)	USC (13-1-1) (1)	UCLA (14-2-2)	South Carolina (15-2-1)	Penn State (14-5-4)	5.
6.	North Carolina	Florida State (1) (2-0-0)	West Virginia (1) (2-1-0)	North Carolina (4-1-0)	West Virginia (1)(5-2-0)	Florida (7-1-0)	Penn State (7-2-1)	USC (8-1-1)	USC (10-1-1)	USC (11-1-1)	UCLA (13-1-2)	USC (14-2-1)	Texas A&M (17-2-1)	Florida (16-7-0)	6.
7.	Florida	UCLA (1) (2-0-0)	USC (1) (1-0-0)	South Carolina (5-1-0)	Florida (5-1-0)	Penn State (6-2-0)	USC (6-1-1)	Texas (11-0-1) (1)	West Virginia (11-3-0)	UCF (9-1-1)	UCF (11-1-1)	West Virginia (14-3-1)	West Virginia (15-3-2)	Princeton (16-3-1)	7.
8.	BYU	Florida (2-0-0)	Clemson (4-0-0)	Virginia (4-1-0)	Penn State (4-2-0)	North Carolina (5-2-0)	Texas (10-0-0)	West Virginia (9-3-0)	UCF (9-1-1)	West Virginia (12-3-0)	Texas (13-1-2)	UCF (12-1-2)	UCF (13-1-3)	North Carolina (16-3-2)	8.
9.	UCLA	Penn State (1) (2-0-0)	North Carolina (2-1-0)	Florida (5-1-0)	Wisconsin (6-1-0)	Wisconsin (7-1-0)	West Virginia (8-3-0)	Florida (9-2-0)	Texas (11-0-2)	Penn State (10-3-2)	West Virginia (13-3-1)	Ohio State (15-3-1)	USC (14-3-1)	Virginia (12-6-4)	9.
10.	Auburn	Virginia (1-0-0)	Georgetown (3-1-0)	Texas A&M (3-0-1)	North Carolina (4-2-0)	USC (6-1-0)	Florida (8-2-0)	UCF (7-1-1)	Florida (10-3-0)	Texas (12-1-2)	Virginia (10-3-4)	Virginia (11-4-4)	Penn State (12-4-4)	West Virginia (16-4-3)	10.
11.	Virginia	Georgetown (1-1-0)	South Carolina (3-1-0)	Duke (5-1-0)	Clemson (6-1-0)	Virginia (5-2-2)	Cal (8-1-0)	Princeton (9-1-0)	Princeton (11-1-0)	Tennessee (13-1-1)	Penn State (10-3-3)	Texas A&M (14-2-1)	Pepperdine (14-2-3)	Baylor (15-6-3)	11.
12.	Duke	Duke (1-1-0)	Texas A&M (2-0-0)	USC (2-1-0)	USC (4-1-0)	Rutgers (7-0-1)	Wisconsin (8-2-0)	Georgetown (9-2-1)	Ohio State (11-2-1)	Virginia (8-3-4)	Pepperdine (12-2-2)	Pepperdine (13-2-3)	Virginia (11-5-4)	Texas A&M (18-2-2)	12.
13.	Clemson	Clemson (2-0-0)	Duke (3-1-0)	Florida State (4-1-0)	Rutgers (6-0-1)	Cal (7-1-0)	UCF (5-1-1)	Virginia (7-3-2)	Penn State (9-3-1)	Pepperdine (10-2-2)	Ohio State (13-3-1)	Princeton (13-2-0)	Princeton (14-2-0)	USC (15-3-2)	13.
14.	Connecticut	Nebraska (2-0-0)	Nebraska (4-0-0)	Rutgers (5-0-0)	Oklahoma State (7-0-1)	UCF (4-1-0)	Princeton (8-1-0)	Penn State (7-3-1)	Virginia (8-3-3)	Texas A&M (11-2-1)	Texas A&M (13-2-1)	Texas (13-2-2)	Ohio State (15-4-1)	Texas (14-4-3)	14.
15.	Florida State	Rutgers (2-0-0)	Florida State (3-1-0)	Georgetown (4-2-0)	UCF (4-1-0)	Georgetown (6-2-1)	Virginia (6-3-2)	Wake Forest (9-2-1)	Georgetown (10-2-2)	Wake Forest (10-3-2)	Princeton (12-2-0)	Penn State (10-4-4)	Georgetown (15-3-3)	Florida State (13-7-1)	15.
16.	Oklahoma	Texas A&M (2-0-0)	Rutgers (3-0-0)	Wisconsin (5-1-0)	Florida State (4-1-0)	Princeton (7-1-0)	Rutgers (8-0-2)	Florida State (8-2-0)	Florida State (9-3-0)	Cal (11-2-1)	Cal (13-2-1)	Oklahoma State (15-2-2)	Florida (14-6-0)	Pepperdine (15-3-3)	16.
17.	Arkansas	BYU (0-1-1)	Utah (3-0-0)	Wake Forest (5-0-0)	Cal (5-1-0)	Texas (8-0-0)	Georgetown (7-2-1)	Ohio State (9-2-1)	Pepperdine (9-2-2)	Princeton (11-2-0)	Florida (12-4-0)	Florida (12-5-0)	Oklahoma State (15-4-2)	UCF (13-2-3)	17.
18.	Notre Dame	Utah (1-0-0)	Wake Forest (4-0-0)	Oklahoma State (5-0-1)	Georgetown (5-2-1)	Wake Forest (7-1-1)	Mississippi (8-1-1)	Pepperdine (8-2-2)	Cal (10-2-1)	Florida State (9-4-0)	Rice (12-2-1)	Tennessee (14-3-1)	Texas (13-3-2)	Notre Dame (10-7-5)	18.
19.	Minnesota	Cal (2-0-0)	Oklahoma State (4-0-0)	Kansas (5-1-0)	Marquette (7-1-0)	Clemson (6-2-0)	Oklahoma State (8-1-2)	Texas A&M (8-2-1)	Tennessee (12-1-1)	Ohio State (12-3-1)	Tennessee (13-3-1)	Georgetown (12-3-3)	Cal (13-5-1)	Washington State (10-8-4)	19.
20.	Utah	Auburn (1-0-1)	North Carolina State (3-0-0)	UCF (4-1-0)	Princeton (6-0-0)	Mississippi (6-1-1)	Wake Forest (8-2-1)	Cal (8-2-1)	Texas A&M (10-2-1)	Florida (10-4-0)	Butler (11-1-5)	Butler (12-1-5)	Tennessee (14-4-1)	Santa Clara (15-7-1)	20.
21.	Rutgers	Connecticut (0-0-1)	Colorado (3-0-1)	Utah (4-1-0)	Texas (7-0-0)	Tennessee (9-0-0)	Florida State (7-2-0)	Tennessee (10-1-1)	Cincinnati (10-1-2)	Cincinnati (11-1-3)	Wake Forest (10-4-3)	Rice (12-2-2)	NC State (14-5-1)	NC State (15-5-2)	21.
22.	Nebraska	Northwestern (2-0-0)	Southern Methodist (2-0-2)	Nebraska (5-1-0)	Texas A&M (4-1-1)	Oklahoma State (7-1-2)	Notre Dame (6-3-2)	Cincinnati (9-1-2)	Wake Forest (9-3-2)	Butler (10-1-4)	Oklahoma State (14-2-2)	Cal (13-4-1)	Rutgers (12-2-5)	Rutgers (13-2-6)	22.
23.	Northwestern	Michigan (2-0-0)	Michigan (3-0-1)	Southern Methodist (3-0-2)	Wake Forest (6-1-1)	Florida State (5-2-0)	Texas A&M (6-2-1)	Rutgers (9-1-2)	Minnesota (9-2-3)	Rice (10-2-1)	Florida State (10-5-0)	Rutgers (12-2-5)	Baylor (13-5-2)	Ohio State (15-5-1)	23.
24.	Santa Clara	Notre Dame (1-0-1)	UCF (2-1-0)	Cal (4-1-0)	Mississippi (6-0-1)	NC State (7-1-1)	Utah (5-2-2)	Mississippi (8-2-1)	Rice (9-2-1)	Oklahoma State (12-2-2)	Notre Dame (9-5-3)	NC State (14-4-1)	Wake Forest (11-5-3)	Georgetown (14-3-4)	24.
25.	Colorado	NC State (2-0-0)	Cal (3-1-0)	Colorado (3-0-2)	Utah (4-2-1)	Utah (5-2-1)	Tennessee (9-1-1)	Oklahoma State (10-1-2)	Oklahoma State (11-2-2)	Rutgers (10-2-4)	Rutgers (11-2-4)	Wake Forest (11-5-3)	South Florida (12-3-2)	Tennessee (15-4-2)	25.
	Preseason Aug. 4	Week 1 Aug. 22	Week 2 Aug. 29	Week 3 Sept. 5	Week 4 Sept. 12	Week 5 Sept. 19	Week 6 Sept. 26	Week 7 Oct. 3	Week 8 Oct. 10	Week 9 Oct. 17	Week 10 Oct. 24	Week 11 Oct. 31	Week 12 Nov. 7	Final Dec. 5	
		Dropped: Colorado; Santa Clara; Minnesota; Arkansas; Oklahoma	Dropped: Notre Dame; Northwestern; Connecticut; Auburn; BYU	Dropped: North Carolina State; Michigan	Dropped: Colorado; Kansas; Nebraska; Southern Methodist	Dropped: Marquette; Texas A&M	Dropped: Clemson; NC State	Dropped: Notre Dame; Utah; Wisconsin	Dropped: Mississippi; Rutgers	Dropped: Georgetown; Minnesota	Dropped: Cincinnati	Dropped: Florida State; Notre Dame	Dropped: Butler; Rice	Dropped: Cal; Oklahoma State; South Florida; Wake Forest	

== Soccer America ==
	Preseason Aug. 16	Week 1 Aug. 21	Week 2 Aug. 28	Week 3 Sept. 5	Week 4 Sept. 12	Week 5 Sept. 18	Week 6 Sept. 25	Week 7 Oct. 3	Week 8 Oct. 10	Week 9 Oct. 17	Week 10 Oct. 24	Week 11 Oct. 31	Final Nov. 6	
1.	Stanford	Stanford (2–0–0)	Penn State (3-0-0)	UCLA (6-0-0)	UCLA (7-0-0)	UCLA (7-0-1)	UCLA (8-0-1)	UCLA (10-0-1)	Stanford (12-1-0)	Stanford (13-1-0)	Stanford (15-1-0)	Stanford (17-1-0)	Stanford (18-1-0)	1.
2.	West Virginia	West Virginia (1–0–0)	UCLA (4-0-0)	Stanford (4-1-0)	Stanford (6-0-1)	Stanford (7-1-0)	Stanford (8-1-0)	Stanford (10-1-0)	UCLA (11-0-2)	UCLA (12-0-2)	Duke (16-1-0)	Duke (18-1-0)	North Carolina (15-2-2)	2.
3.	Penn State	Penn State (2–0–0)	Florida (4-0-0)	West Virginia (4-1-0)	Virginia (5-2-0)	Penn State (6-2-0)	Penn State (7-2-1)	North Carolina (8-2-0)	North Carolina (10-2-0)	North Carolina (11-2-0)	North Carolina (12-2-1)	North Carolina (13-2-2)	Duke (19-2-0)	3.
4.	UCLA	UCLA (2–0–0)	Virginia (3-0-0)	Penn State (3-1-0)	Penn State (4-2-0)	Florida (7-1-0)	North Carolina (7-2-0)	Duke (10-1-0)	Duke (13-1-0)	Duke (14-1-0)	USC (13-1-1)	South Carolina (15-1-1)	UCLA (15-2-2)	4.
5.	Florida State	Florida State (2–0–0)	Stanford (2-1-0)	Florida (5-1-0)	Florida (5-1-0)	Duke (8-1-0)	Duke (9-1-0)	South Carolina (10-1-0)	South Carolina (12-1-0)	South Carolina (13-1-0)	South Carolina (14-1-1)	USC (14-2-1)	South Carolina (15-2-1)	5.
6.	Georgetown	South Carolina (2–0–0)	West Virginia (2-1-0)	Virginia (4-1-0)	Duke (6-1-0)	West Virginia (7-2-0)	South Carolina (9-1-0)	Florida State (8-2-0)	Florida (11-2-0)	West Virginia (12-3-0)	UCLA (13-1-2)	UCLA (14-2-2)	USC (14-3-1)	6.
7.	South Carolina	USC (1–0–0)	USC (1-0-0)	Wake Forest (5-0-0)	West Virginia (5-2-0)	South Carolina (7-1-0)	Texas (10-0-0)	Texas (11-0-1)	Texas (11-0-2)	USC (11-1-1)	West Virginia (13-3-1)	West Virginia (14-3-1)	Texas A&M (17-2-1)	7.
8.	USC	Florida (2–0–0)	Wake Forest (4-0-0)	Florida State (4-1-0)	Florida State (4-1-0)	Virginia (5-2-2)	Florida State (7-2-0)	Georgetown (9-2-1)	Georgetown (10-2-2)	Wake Forest (10-3-2)	Penn State (10-3-3)	Texas A&M (14-2-1)	Georgetown (14-3-3)	8.
9.	Florida	North Carolina (1–0–0)	Florida State (3-1-0)	South Carolina (5-1-0)	South Carolina (6-1-0)	North Carolina (5-2-0)	Georgetown (7-2-1)	Florida (9-2-0)	Florida State (9-3-0)	Florida State (10-4-0)	Texas A&M (13-2-1)	Oklahoma State (15-2-2)	Penn State (12-4-4)	9.
10.	North Carolina	Virginia (1–0–0)	South Carolina (3-1-0)	North Carolina (4-1-0)	North Carolina (4-2-0)	Wisconsin (7-1-0)	Florida (8-2-0)	Penn State (7-3-1)	Penn State (9-3-1)	Penn State (10-3-2)	UCF (12-1-1)	Georgetown (12-3-3)	Princeton (14-2-0)	10.
11.	Santa Clara	California (2–0–0)	Georgetown (3-1-0)	Duke (5-1-0)	Wisconsin (6-1-0)	USC (6-1-0)	West Virginia (8-3-0)	West Virginia (9-3-0)	West Virginia (11-3-0)	Texas A&M (11-2-1)	Virginia (10-3-4)	Virginia (11-4-4)	UCF (13-1-3)	11.
12.	BYU	Georgetown (1–1–0)	North Carolina (2-1-0)	Clemson (6-0-0)	USC (4-1-0)	Florida State (5-2-0)	Virginia (6-3-2)	Virginia (7-3-2)	USC (10-1-1)	UCF (10-1-1)	Florida (13-4-0)	Ohio State (15-3-1)	Pepperdine (14-2-3)	12.
13.	Duke	Santa Clara (1–1–0)	Duke (3-1-0)	Wisconsin (5-1-0)	Clemson (6-1-0)	Georgetown (6-2-1)	Cal (8-1-0)	USC (8-1-1)	Virginia (8-3-3)	Tennessee (13-1-1)	Texas (13-1-2)	Wisconsin (13-4-2)	West Virginia (15-4-1)	13.
14.	Virginia	BYU (0–1–0)	Utah (3-0-0)	USC (2-1-0)	Princeton (6-0-0)	Rutgers (7-0-1)	Princeton (8-1-0)	Princeton (9-1-0)	Princeton (11-1-0)	Virginia (8-3-4)	Cal (13-2-1)	Penn State (10-4-4)	Oklahoma State (16-3-2)	14.
15.	Cal	Duke (1–1–0)	Clemson (4-0-0)	Georgetown (4-2-0)	Georgetown (5-2-1)	California (7-1-0)	USC (6-1-1)	Ohio State (9-2-1)	Ohio State (11-2-1)	Florida (11-4-0)	Oklahoma State (14-2-2)	UCF (12-1-2)	Virginia (11-5-4)	15.
16.	Notre Dame	Utah (1–0–0)	Texas A&M (2-0-0)	Rutgers (5-0-0)	Rutgers (6-0-1)	Princeton (7-1-0)	Rutgers (8-0-2)	Wake Forest (9-2-1)	Texas A&M (10-2-1)	Texas (12-1-2)	Wake Forest (10-4-3)	Princeton (13-2-0)	Ohio State (15-4-1)	16.
17.	Utah	Clemson (2–0–0)	Rutgers (3-0-0)	Memphis (5-0-0)	California (5-1-0)	Wake Forest (7-1-1)	Notre Dame (6-2-2)	Texas A&M (7-2-1)	UCF (9-1-1)	Georgetown (10-3-2)	Florida State (11-5-0)	Florida (13-5-0)	Wisconsin (13-5-2)	17.
18.	Clemson	Northwestern (2–0–0)	Colorado (3-0-1)	California (4-1-0)	Wake Forest (6-1-0)	Notre Dame (5-2-2)	Butler (8-1-1)	UCF (7-1-1)	Wake Forest (9-3-2)	Cal (11-2-1)	Georgetown (10-3-3)	Texas (13-2-2)	Florida (14-6-0)	18.
19.	Colorado	Texas A&M (2–0–0)	Nebraska (4-0-0)	Texas A&M (3-0-1)	Alabama (7-1-0)	Tennessee (9-0-0)	Mississippi (9-1-1)	Butler (9-1-2)	Tennessee (12-1-1)	Oklahoma State (12-2-2)	Rutgers (11-2-4)	Cal(13-4-1)	Texas (13-3-2)	19.
20.	Northwestern	Rutgers (2–0–0)	Memphis (3-0-0)	Colorado (4-0-2)	Mississippi (7-0-1)	Butler (6-1-1)	Texas A&M (6-2-1)	Tennessee (10-1-1)	Cincinnati (10-1-2)	Cincinnati (11-1-3)	Princeton (12-2-0)	Rutgers (12-2-5)	Cal (13-5-1)	20.
21.	Texas A&M	Notre Dame (1–0–1)	Cal (3-1-0)	Notre Dame (3-1-2)	Butler (5-1-1)	Texas (8-0-0)	Wisconsin (8-2-0)	Oklahoma State (10-1-2)	Cal (10-2-1)	Rutgers (10-2-4)	Ohio State (13-3-1)	Pepperdine (13-2-3)	Rutgers (12-2-5)	21.
22.	Rutgers	Colorado (1–0–1)	Santa Clara (2-2-0)	Alabama (5-1-0)	Texas (7-0-0)	Clemson (6-2-0)	UCF (5-1-1)	Cincinnati (9-1-2)	Minnesota (9-2-3)	Princeton (11-2-0)	Pepperdine (12-2-2)	Butler (12-1-5)	Butler (13-2-5)	22.
23.	Kansas	Nebraska (2–0–0)	Notre Dame (2-0-2)	Utah (4-1-0)	Ohio State (5-1-1)	NC State (7-1-1)	Ohio State (8-2-1)	Cal (8-2-1)	Oklahoma State (11-2-2)	Ohio State (12-3-1)	Clemson (9-5-2)	Wake Forest (11-5-3)	NC State (14-5-1) & Wake Forest (11-5-3)	23.
24.	Memphis	Memphis (2–0–0)	Alabama (3-1-0)	Nebraska (5-1-0)	Utah (4-1-1)	Alabama (8-2-0)	Tennessee (9-1-1)	Minnesota (7-2-3)	Butler (10-1-3)	Pepperdine (10-2-2)	Notre Dame (9-5-3)	Florida State (11-6-1)	Florida State (11-6-1)	24.
25.	Auburn	Auburn (1–0–1)	NC State (3-0-0)	Kansas (5-1-0)	NC State (6-1-0)	Mississippi (7-1-1)	Michigan (5-2-4)	Rutgers (9-1-2)	Pepperdine (9-2-2)	Butler (10-1-4)	Butler (10-1-5)	Clemson (9-5-3)	Clemson (9-5-3)	25.
	Preseason Aug. 16	Week 1 Aug. 21	Week 2 Aug. 28	Week 3 Sept. 5	Week 4 Sept. 12	Week 5 Sept. 18	Week 6 Sept. 25	Week 7 Oct. 3	Week 8 Oct. 10	Week 9 Oct. 17	Week 10 Oct. 24	Week 11 Oct. 31	Final Nov. 6	
		Dropped: Kansas	Dropped: Auburn; BYU; Northwestern	Dropped: NC State; Santa Clara	Dropped: Colorado; Kansas; Memphis; Nebraska; Notre Dame; Texas A&M	Dropped: Ohio State; Utah	Dropped: Alabama; Clemson; NC State; Wake Forest	Dropped: Michigan; Mississippi; Notre Dame; Wisconsin	Dropped: Rutgers	Dropped: Minnesota	Dropped: Cincinnati; Tennessee	Dropped: Notre Dame	None	

== Top Drawer ==
	Preseason Aug. 1	Week 1 Aug. 17	Week 2 Aug. 21	Week 3 Aug. 28	Week 4 Sept. 5	Week 5 Sept. 11	Week 6 Sept. 18	Week 7 Sept. 25	Week 8 Oct. 2	Week 9 Oct. 9	Week 10 Oct. 16	Week 11 Oct. 23	Week 12 Oct. 30	Week 13 Nov. 6	Week 14 Nov. 13	Week 15 Nov. 20	Week 16 Nov. 27	Final	
1.	Penn State	Penn State	Penn State	Penn State (3-0-0)	UCLA (6-0-0)	UCLA (7-0-0)	UCLA (7-0-1)	UCLA (8-0-1)	UCLA (10-0-1)	Stanford (12-1-0)	Stanford (13-1-0)	Stanford (15-1-0)	Stanford (17-1-0)	Stanford (18-1-0)	Stanford (19-1-0)	Stanford (21-1-0)	Stanford (22-1-0)	Stanford (24-1-0)	1.
2.	Stanford	Stanford	Stanford	UCLA (4-0-0)	Stanford (4-1-0)	Stanford (5-1-0)	Stanford (7-1-0)	Stanford (8-1-0)	Stanford (10-1-0)	UCLA (11-0-2)	UCLA (12-0-2)	Duke (16-1-0)	Duke (18-1-0)	North Carolina (15-2-2)	North Carolina (16-2-2)	UCLA (18-2-2)	UCLA (19-2-2)	UCLA (20-3-2)	2.
3.	West Virginia	West Virginia	West Virginia	Florida (4-0-0)	West Virginia (4-1-0)	Duke (6-1-0)	Duke (8-1-0)	South Carolina (9-1-0)	South Carolina (10-1-0)	South Carolina (12-1-0)	South Carolina (13-1-0)	South Carolina (14-1-1)	South Carolina (15-1-1)	UCLA (15-2-2)	UCLA (16-2-2)	Duke (23-2-0)	Duke (23-2-0)	Duke (23-3-0)	3.
4.	Florida State	Florida State	Florida State	Virginia (3-0-0)	Penn State (3-1-0)	South Carolina (6-1-0)	South Carolina (7-1-0)	Duke (9-1-0)	Duke (10-1-0)	Duke (13-1-0)	Duke (14-1-0)	North Carolina (12-2-1)	North Carolina (13-2-2)	Texas A&M (17-2-1)	Texas A&M (18-2-1)	Princeton (17-2-0)	South Carolina (19-2-1)	South Carolina (19-3-1)	4.
5.	Duke	Duke	UCLA	USC (1-0-0)	Florida State (4-1-0)	Florida State (4-1-0)	North Carolina (5-2-0)	North Carolina (7-2-0)	North Carolina (8-2-0)	North Carolina (10-2-0)	North Carolina (11-2-0)	USC (13-1-1)	West Virginia (14-3-1)	Duke (19-2-0)	Duke (20-2-0)	South Carolina (18-2-1)	Princeton (17-3-0)	Princeton (17-3-0)	5.
6.	UCLA	UCLA	California	Stanford (2-1-0)	Duke (5-1-0)	Penn State (4-1-1)	Florida State (5-2-0)	Florida State (7-2-0)	Florida State (8-2-0)	USC (10-1-1)	USC (11-1-1)	UCF (12-1-1)	Texas A&M (14-2-1)	Princeton (14-2-0)	Princeton (15-2-0)	Penn State (17-4-3)	Penn State (16-5-3)	Penn State (16-5-3)	6.
7.	Cal	California	USC	West Virginia (2-1-0)	Florida (5-1-0)	Florida (5-1-0)	Florida (7-1-0)	Penn State (7-2-1)	USC (8-1-1)	Texas (11-0-2)	West Virginia (12-3-0)	UCLA (13-1-2)	UCF (12-1-2)	South Carolina (15-2-1)	South Carolina (16-2-1)	Florida (18-6-0)	Florida (18-7-0)	Florida (18-7-0)	7.
8.	USC	USC	North Carolina	Florida State (3-1-0)	Virginia (4-1-0)	West Virginia (4-2-0)	Penn State (6-2-0)	Texas (10-0-0)	Texas (11-0-1)	West Virginia (11-3-0)	UCF (10-1-1)	West Virginia (13-3-1)	UCLA (14-2-2)	Georgetown (14-3-3)	West Virginia (16-4-1)	Baylor (16-5-2)	Baylor (16-6-2)	Baylor (16-6-2)	8.
9.	North Carolina	North Carolina	Duke	Duke (3-1-0)	South Carolina (5-1-0)	Virginia (4-2-1)	West Virginia (7-2-0)	Rutgers (8-0-2)	West Virginia (9-3-0)	UCF (9-1-1)	Penn State (10-3-2)	Florida (13-4-0)	USC (14-2-1)	UCF (13-2-2)	Pepperdine (15-2-3)	Virginia (13-6-4)	Virginia (13-6-4)	Virginia (13-6-4)	9.
10.	Georgetown	Georgetown	South Carolina	Georgetown (3-1-0)	USC (2-1-0)	USC (3-1-0)	USC (6-1-0)	West Virginia (8-3-0)	Georgetown (9-2-1)	Georgetown (10-2-2)	Wake Forest (10-3-2)	Penn State (10-3-3)	Ohio State (15-3-1)	West Virginia (15-4-1)	Penn State (14-4-3)	West Virginia (17-5-1)	West Virginia (17-5-1)	West Virginia (17-5-1)	10.
11.	Santa Clara	Santa Clara	Georgetown	Utah (3-0-0)	Clemson (6-0-0)	Georgetown (5-2-0)	Rutgers (7-0-1)	USC (6-1-1)	Princeton (9-1-0)	Princeton (11-1-0)	Texas (12-1-2)	Texas A&M (13-2-1)	Virginia (11-4-4)	Pepperdine (14-2-3)	USC (15-3-1)	North Carolina (17-3-2)	North Carolina (17-3-2)	North Carolina (17-3-2)	11.
12.	South Carolina	South Carolina	Utah	Clemson (4-0-0)	North Carolina (4-1-0)	Clemson (6-1-0)	Georgetown (6-2-1)	Georgetown (7-2-1)	Penn State (7-3-1)	Penn State (9-3-1)	Tennessee (13-1-1)	Texas (13-1-2)	Princeton (13-2-0)	Penn State (13-4-3)	Virginia (12-5-4)	Texas A&M (18-3-1)	Texas A&M (18-3-1)	Texas A&M (18-3-1)	12.
13.	Utah	Utah	Santa Clara	North Carolina (2-1-0)	Georgetown (4-2-0)	Rutgers (6-0-0)	Wisconsin (7-1-0)	Cal (8-1-0)	Rutgers (9-1-2)	Florida (11-2-0)	Virginia (8-3-4)	Ohio State (13-3-1)	Florida (13-5-0)	USC (14-3-1)	Florida (15-6-0)	Pepperdine (15-3-3)	Pepperdine (15-3-3)	Pepperdine (15-3-3)	13.
14.	Notre Dame	Notre Dame	Florida	South Carolina (3-1-0)	Rutgers (5-0-0)	North Carolina (4-2-0)	Virginia (5-2-2)	Princeton (8-1-0)	Florida (9-2-0)	Florida State (9-3-0)	Florida State (10-4-0)	Virginia (10-3-4)	Pepperdine (13-2-3)	Virginia (11-5-4)	Georgetown (14-4-3)	USC (15-4-1)	USC (15-4-1)	USC (15-4-1)	14.
15.	Florida	Florida	Notre Dame	Notre Dame (2-0-2)	Utah (4-1-0)	Cal (5-1-0)	Cal (7-1-0)	Florida (8-2-0)	Ohio State (9-2-1)	Ohio State (11-2-1)	Texas A&M (11-2-1)	Pepperdine (12-2-2)	Oklahoma State (15-2-2)	Florida (14-6-0)	NC State (15-5-1)	Georgetown (14-4-3)	Georgetown (14-4-3)	Georgetown (14-4-3)	15.
16.	Colorado	Colorado	Northwestern	Colorado (3-0-1)	Cal (4-1-0)	Wisconsin (6-1-0)	Tennessee (9-0-0)	Notre Dame (6-2-2)	Wake Forest (9-2-1)	Tennessee (12-1-1)	Cincinnati (11-1-3)	Princeton (12-2-0)	Georgetown (12-3-3)	Ohio State (15-4-1)	Oklahoma State (17-3-2)	NC State (16-6-1)	NC State (16-6-1)	NC State (16-6-1)	16.
17.	Northwestern	Northwestern	Virginia	Cal (2-1-1)	Wake Forest (5-1-0)	Princeton (5-0-0)	Princeton (7-1-0)	Tennessee (9-1-1)	Tennessee (10-1-1)	Virginia (8-3-3)	Georgetown (10-3-2)	Wake Forest (10-4-3)	Penn State (10-4-4)	NC State (14-5-1)	UCF (13-3-2)	Oklahoma State (17-4-2)	Oklahoma State (17-4-2)	Oklahoma State (17-4-2)	17.
18.	Arkansas	Arkansas	Clemson	NC State (3-0-0)	Memphis (5-0-0)	Wake Forest (6-1-0)	Wake Forest (7-1-1)	Virginia (6-3-2)	Virginia (7-3-2)	Cincinnati (10-1-2)	Ohio State (12-3-1)	Georgetown (11-3-3)	Wake Forest (11-5-3)	Oklahoma State (16-3-2)	Wake Forest (12-5-3)	UCF (13-3-2)	UCF (13-3-2)	UCF (13-3-2)	18.
19.	Virginia	Virginia	Texas A&M	Texas A&M (2-0-0)	Texas A&M (3-0-1)	Cincinnati (5-0-1)	Notre Dame (5-2-2)	Utah (5-2-2)	Oklahoma State (10-1-2)	Wake Forest (9-3-2)	Florida (11-4-0)	Cal (13-2-1)	Texas (13-2-2)	Wake Forest (11-5-3)	Texas (14-3-2)	Wake Forest (12-6-3)	Wake Forest (12-6-3)	Wake Forest (12-6-3)	19.
20.	BYU	BYU	Colorado	Rutgers (3-0-0)	Notre Dame (3-1-2)	Texas A&M (3-1-1)	Clemson (6-2-0)	Oklahoma State (8-1-2)	Cincinnati (9-1-2)	Texas A&M (10-2-1)	Princeton (11-2-0)	Oklahoma State (14-2-2)	Tennessee (14-3-1)	Texas (13-3-2)	Tennessee (15-4-1)	Texas (15-4-2)	Texas (15-4-2)	Texas (15-4-2)	20.
21.	Clemson	Clemson	NC State	Northwestern (3-1-0)	Colorado (4-0-2)	Utah (4-1-1)	NC State (7-1-1)	Cincinnati (7-1-2)	UCF (7-1-1)	Oklahoma State (11-2-2)	Oklahoma State (12-2-2)	Rutgers (11-2-4)	Cal (13-4-1)	Tennessee (14-4-1)	Northwestern (12-7-3)	Tennessee (16-5-1)	Tennessee (15-5-1)	Tennessee (15-5-1)	21.
22.	Texas A&M	Texas A&M	BYU	Michigan (3-0-1)	Kansas (5-1-0)	NC State (5-1-0)	Texas (8-0-0)	Ohio State (8-2-1)	Texas A&M (7-2-1)	Pepperdine (9-2-2)	Pepperdine (10-2-2)	Tennessee (13-3-1)	Rutgers (12-2-5)	Northwestern (12-7-2)	Rutgers (13-3-4)	Northwestern (13-8-2)	Northwestern (13-8-2)	Northwestern (13-8-2)	22.
23.	NC State	NC State	Arkansas	Wake Forest (4-0-0)	NC State (4-1-0)	Memphis (6-0-0)	Utah (5-2-1)	UCF (5-1-1)	Pepperdine (8-2-2)	Cal (10-2-1)	Cal (11-2-1)	Florida State (11-5-0)	Arizona (9-4-4)	Rutgers (12-3-4)	Florida State (12-6-1)	Rutgers (13-4-4)	Rutgers (13-4-4)	Rutgers (13-4-4)	23.
24.	Long Beach State	Long Beach State	Memphis	Memphis (3-0-0)	Cincinnati (4-0-1)	Oklahoma State (6-0-1)	Oklahoma State (7-1-2)	Texas A&M (6-2-1)	Cal (8-2-1)	Rutgers (9-2-3)	Rutgers (10-2-4)	Cincinnati (11-3-3)	Cincinnati (12-3-3)	Cal (13-5-1)	Arizona (11-4-4)	Florida State (13-7-1)	Florida State (13-7-1)	Florida State (13-7-1)	24.
25.	Auburn	Auburn	Auburn	Long Beach State (3-1-0)	Oklahoma State (5-0-1)	Texas (6-0-0)	Cincinnati (6-1-1)	Michigan (5-2-4)	Washington (8-3-1)	Washington (9-3-2)	Florida Gulf Coast (11-2-1)	Rice (12-2-1)	NC State (14-4-1)	Arizona (10-4-4)	Ohio State (15-5-1)	Arizona (12-5-4)	Arizona (12-5-4)	Arizona (12-5-4)	25.
	Preseason Aug. 1	Week 1 Aug. 17	Week 2 Aug. 21	Week 3 Aug. 28	Week 4 Sept. 5	Week 5 Sept. 11	Week 6 Sept. 18	Week 7 Sept. 25	Week 8 Oct. 2	Week 9 Oct. 9	Week 10 Oct. 16	Week 11 Oct. 23	Week 12 Oct. 30	Week 13 Nov. 6	Week 14 Nov. 13	Week 15 Nov. 20	Week 16 Nov. 27	Final	
		None	Dropped: Long Beach State	Dropped: Auburn; Arkansas; BYU; Santa Clara	Dropped: Michigan; Long Beach State; Northwestern	Dropped: Colorado; Kansas; Notre Dame	Dropped: Memphis; Utah	Dropped: Clemson; NC State; Wake Forest; Wisconsin	Dropped: Michigan; Notre Dame; Utah	None	Dropped: Washington	Dropped: Florida Gulf Coast	Dropped: Florida State; Rice	Dropped: Cincinnati	Dropped: Cal	Dropped: Ohio State	None	None	
