= FA WSL 2 Spring Series =

FA WSL 2
- Season: 2017 Spring Series
- Matches: 45
- Goals: 138 (3.07 per match)
- Top goalscorer: Courtney Sweetman-Kirk (9 goals)
- Biggest home win: Everton 5–0 Brighton & Hove Albion (30 April 2017)
- Biggest away win: London Bees 0–4 Everton (20 May 2017); Oxford United 0–4 Doncaster Rovers Belles (21 May 2017)
- Highest scoring: Aston Villa 5–4 Durham (21 May 2017)

The FA WSL 2 Spring Series was an interim edition of the FA WSL 2 between the fourth and fifth full seasons. The Spring Series ran from February to May 2017 to bridge the gap from the 2016 season which ran from March to September as a summer tournament, and the 2017–18 season which started in September 2017.

Teams played each other once, with no promotion or relegation before the full 2017–18 season.

== Teams ==
Locations of the Spring Series WSL 2 teams

| Team | Location | Ground | Capacity | 2016 season |
|---|---|---|---|---|
| Aston Villa | Tamworth | The Lamb Ground | 4,000 | 7th |
| Brighton & Hove Albion | Lancing | Culver Road | 2,000 | 1st, 2015–16 WPL |
| Doncaster Rovers Belles | Doncaster | Keepmoat Stadium | 15,231 | 9th, FA WSL 1 |
| Durham | Durham | New Ferens Park | 3,000 | 4th |
| Everton | Widnes | Select Security Stadium | 13,350 | 3rd |
| London Bees | Canons Park | The Hive Stadium | 5,176 | 6th |
| Millwall Lionesses | Bermondsey | St. Paul's Sports Ground | 2,500 | 8th |
| Oxford United | Abingdon | Northcourt Road | 2,000 | 9th |
| Sheffield | Dronfield | Coach and Horses | 2,000 | 5th |
| Watford | Kings Langley | Global Metcorp Stadium | 1,000 | 10th |

Ten teams competed in this season. Brighton & Hove Albion was promoted after beating Sporting Club Albion in the 2015–16 FA Women's Premier League Championship play-off. Following the closure of Notts County in April 2017, one team was promoted at the end of the Spring Series to the WSL1 for the 2017–18 season, based on an evaluation by the FA of applicant clubs' business plans, budget, youth development, facilities and on-pitch performance.

=== Table ===
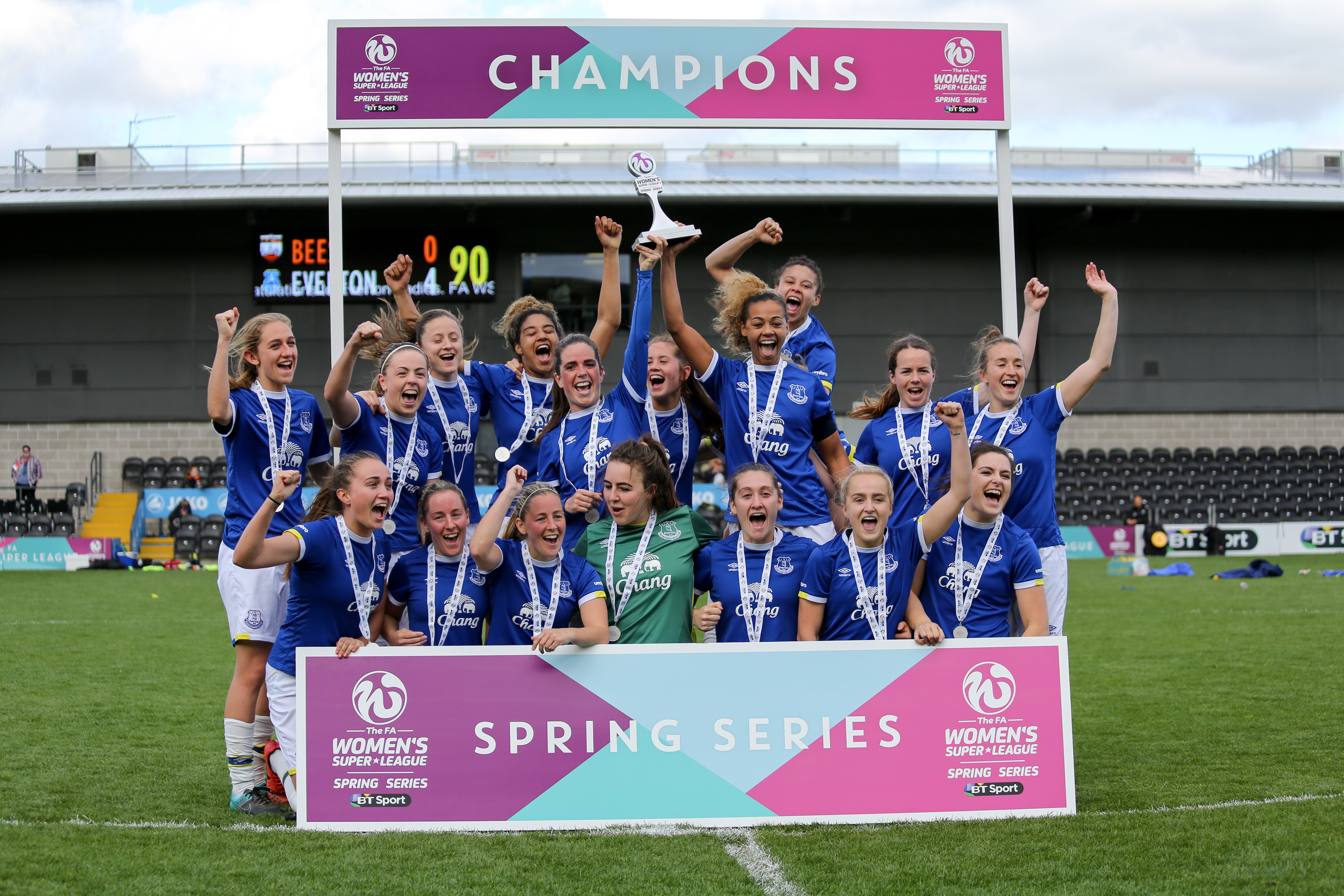
Everton celebrates winning the FA WSL 2 Spring Series.

| Pos | Team | Pld | W | D | L | GF | GA | GD | Pts | |
|---|---|---|---|---|---|---|---|---|---|---|
| 1 | Everton | 9 | 7 | 1 | 1 | 25 | 7 | +18 | 22 | Applied for promotion to the FA WSL 1. Promotion approved. |
| 2 | Doncaster Rovers Belles | 9 | 5 | 3 | 1 | 19 | 9 | +10 | 18 | Applied for promotion to the FA WSL 1. |
| 3 | Millwall Lionesses | 9 | 5 | 2 | 2 | 12 | 8 | +4 | 17 | |
| 4 | Aston Villa | 9 | 5 | 2 | 2 | 19 | 16 | +3 | 17 | |
| 5 | Durham | 9 | 5 | 1 | 3 | 14 | 10 | +4 | 16 | |
| 6 | Brighton & Hove Albion | 9 | 2 | 4 | 3 | 8 | 13 | −5 | 10 | |
| 7 | London Bees | 9 | 3 | 1 | 5 | 13 | 21 | −8 | 10 | |
| 8 | Watford | 9 | 2 | 2 | 5 | 12 | 17 | −5 | 8 | |
| 9 | Sheffield | 9 | 2 | 0 | 7 | 9 | 18 | −9 | 6 | |
| 10 | Oxford United | 9 | 0 | 2 | 7 | 7 | 19 | −12 | 2 | |

Source: FA WSL
Rules for classification: 1) Points; 2) Goal difference; 3) Number of goals scored

=== Results ===
| Home \ Away | AST | BRH | DON | DUR | EVE | LON | MIL | OXF | SHE | WAT |
|---|---|---|---|---|---|---|---|---|---|---|
| Aston Villa | | 3–1 | | 5–4 | | 3–2 | 1–1 | | | 3–2 |
| Brighton & Hove Albion | | | 0–0 | | | | | 1–1 | 3–1 | 2–1 |
| Doncaster Rovers Belles | 2–1 | | | 2–1 | 3–3 | 4–1 | | | | |
| Durham | | 1–0 | | | | 3–0 | 1–0 | 2–1 | 1–0 | |
| Everton | 3–0 | 5–0 | | 1–0 | | | | | | 4–0 |
| London Bees | | 1–1 | | | 0–4 | | 1–2 | 3–1 | 2–1 | |
| Millwall Lionesses | | 0–0 | 2–1 | | 2–1 | | | 2–0 | 1–2 | |
| Oxford United | 0–0 | | 0–4 | | 1–2 | | | | | 1–2 |
| Sheffield | 1–3 | | 0–2 | | 1–2 | | | 3–2 | | |
| Watford | | | 1–1 | 1–1 | | 2–3 | 1–2 | | 2–0 | |

Source: FA WSL
Legend: Blue = home team win; Yellow = draw; Red = away team win.

=== Top goalscorers ===
| Rank | Player | Team | Goals |
|---|---|---|---|
| 1 | (England) Courtney Sweetman-Kirk | Doncaster Rovers Belles | 9 |
| 2 | (England) Claudia Walker | Everton | 7 |
| 3 | (Northern Ireland) Simone Magill | Everton | 5 |
| 3 | (Scotland) Zoe Ness | Durham | 5 |
| 5 | (England) Natasha Baptiste | Aston Villa | 4 |
| 5 | (England) Ashleigh Goddard | London Bees | 4 |
| 5 | (Nigeria) Ini-Abasi Umotong | Oxford United | 4 |
| 5 | (England) Jo Wilson | London Bees | 4 |
