= Syracuse Orange women's soccer =

American college soccer team

- 2025 Syracuse Orange women's soccer team
- Founded: 1996; 30 years ago
- University: Syracuse University
- Head coach: Nicky Thrasher Adams (8th season)
- Conference: ACC
- Location: Syracuse, New York, US
- Stadium: SU Soccer Stadium (capacity: 1,500)
- Nickname: Orange
- Colors: Orange
Home	Away

NCAA tournament Round of 32
- 1998, 2001

NCAA tournament appearances
- 1998, 2001

The Syracuse Orange women's soccer team is who represents Syracuse University in the Atlantic Coast Conference (ACC) of NCAA Division I women's college soccer. The team has never won a conference championship. The Orange have played in both the ACC and Big East. The team has advanced to the NCAA Women's soccer tournament twice. In both appearances, the Orange won their first-round game, but fell in their second round match.

== History ==
=== 1990s ===
The Syracuse Orange women's soccer program was founded in 1996 with April Kater as the first head coach. The team played outside of a conference in their first season and finished a respectable 10–6–1. In 1997, the Orange joined Big East Conference play, where the university was a full member. The team finished with a 14–5 overall record and a 6–5 conference record. 14 wins is a tie for the program's most overall wins, with the mark also being reached in 1998 and 2000. In 1998, the team qualified for its first ever Big East Tournament and its first NCAA Tournament. The team lost in the second round of both tournaments. The team also set a program record for 7 conference wins, a record that still stands today. The decade closed with another post-season appearance in the Big East Tournament. This time the team lost in the first round.

=== 2000s ===
The decade started off with a third consecutive Big East Tournament appearance for the Orange, and 14 overall wins. The Orange would follow up that performance with a second NCAA Tournament appearance in 2001. However, fortunes would quickly change. 2001 would be the final time the team has qualified for the NCAA Tournament to date. 2002 saw the team win only 3 games, a tie for program worst. The Orange also did not win a game in conference play. 2003 saw an improvement to 9–8–1, but it was not enough for coach April Kater to continue with the program. She resigned her post in April 2004. Patrick Farmer was hired as the program's second coach in May 2004. Farmer's tenure with the team would last 4 seasons. The Orange would qualify for the Big East Tournament once, in 2005. However, the team would never have a winning overall or conference season during his tenure. The team would lose 12 games in back to back seasons from 2005 to 2006. In January 2008, Farmer would resign to pursue other opportunities. Phil Wheddon was hired as Farmer's replacement in March 2008. Wheddon's first to seasons saw the team finish 2–8–1 in conference play, and lose 11 games overall.

=== 2010s ===
The decade started with a slight improvement, with the Orange winning one additional overall and conference game compared to 2009. 2011 continued to build on this improvement, with the team qualifying for the Big East Tournament for the first time since 2005. In 2012, the Orange had their first overall winning season since 2003 and qualified for the Big East Tournament again. In 2013, the Orange joined the Atlantic Coast Conference. Life in the new conference would prove difficult, as the team finished 3–9–1 in conference play. The team also lost double digit overall games in each season from 2013 to 2015. 2016 was a lone overall bright spot, when the Orange mustered a .500 record, finishing 8–8–3 overall, but only won one game in conference play. 2018 was one of the worst seasons in team history. The Orange finished 3–15–0 overall, and 0–10 in the conference. This was the team's second winless conference season and the second time the team has won only 3 overall games. Wheddon resigned after the season. Prior to the 2019 season, Nicky Adams was hired as the programs fourth coach.

=== 2020s ===
The decade started with a season shortened by the COVID-19 pandemic. The Orange did not play non-conference matchups and finished the season 1–7–0, in 12th place in the ACC. In 2021, the Orange returned to a more normal schedule and went 0–10–0 in ACC play and 4–12–1 overall to finish in 14th place in the ACC. It was the second time in four years the Orange finished winless in conference play. Their four total wins was a program high for the past four seasons. The Orange improved on their record in 2022 finishing 8–7–3 overall and 1–6–3 in ACC play. Their eight total wins were their best since 2016, and this was the first time the team finished above .500 overall since 2012, prior to joining the ACC. Their six conference points were their most since 2017. Their momentum did not carry over to the 2023 season as they finished 2–14–2 overall and 0–9–1 in ACC play. Their two wins were the second lowest in program history, only ahead of the 2020 season. In the 2024 season, the Orange improved on their win total, finishing 6–10–2 overall, but did not improve in ACC play, again finishing 0–9–1. It was their third winless conference season in four years. The Orange ended their conference winless streak in 2025, but could only manage one conference win, and finished 1–8–1 in ACC play. Their win total dropped slightly compared to 2024 as they finished 5–9–4 overall.

== Personnel ==
=== Current roster ===
As of December 1, 2025

Note: Flags indicate national team as defined under FIFA eligibility rules; some limited exceptions apply. Players may hold more than one non-FIFA nationality.

No.	Pos.	Nation	Player
0	GK	USA	Sam Haley
2	MF	USA	Julia Arbelaez
3	DF	USA	Jasmine Nixon
4	FW	USA	Ashley Rauch (Captain)
5	MF	SWE	Julia Coval
6	FW	USA	Mia Klammer
7	FW	USA	Ava Uribe
8	FW	CAN	Vita Naihin
9	DF	USA	Kendyl Lauher
10	MF	USA	Gabby Wisbeck
11	FW	USA	Moo Galbus
12	DF	USA	Aleena Ulke
13	FW	USA	Anna Rupert
14	DF	USA	Natalie Magnotta

No.	Pos.	Nation	Player
15	FW	USA	Maya McDermott
16	FW	CAN	Leda Naihin
17	MF	USA	Abby Incorvaia
18	MF	USA	Olivia Bozzo
19	DF	USA	Anna Croyle
20	DF	USA	Emma Klein (Captain)
21	MF	USA	Mackenzie Dupre
22	DF	USA	Cierra Collins
23	FW	USA	Julia Dening
24	DF	USA	Caro Monterrey
27	GK	USA	Blythe Braun
29	GK	USA	Lilly Heaslet
30	GK	USA	Shea Vanderbosch (Captain)
33	DF	USA	Bree Bridges

=== Team management ===
Position	Name
Head coach	Nicky Thrasher Adams
Assistant coach	Brandon DeNoyer
Assistant coach	Alex Zaroyan

== Seasons ==
Season	Head coach	Season result							Tournament results	
Season	Head coach	Overall			Conference				Conference	NCAA
Season	Head coach	Wins	Losses	Ties	Wins	Losses	Ties	Finish	Conference	NCAA
1996	April Kater	10	6	1	No Conference					—
1997^	April Kater	14	5	0	6	5	0	5th	—	—
1998	April Kater	14	7	1	7	3	1	3rd	Second round	NCAA Second Round
1999	April Kater	12	6	2	3	1	1	2nd Northeast	First round	—
2000	April Kater	14	7	0	3	2	0	3rd Northeast	Second round	—
2001	April Kater	12	7	0	6	4	0	5th Northeast	—	NCAA Second Round
2002	April Kater	3	11	3	0	5	1	7th Northeast	—	—
2003	April Kater	9	8	1	3	6	1	5th Northeast	—	—
2004	Patrick Farmer	8	9	2	2	7	1	9th	—	—
2005	Patrick Farmer	4	12	4	3	6	3	4th Division A	First round	—
2006	Patrick Farmer	4	12	3	3	7	1	6th American	—	—
2007	Patrick Farmer	7	8	4	3	6	2	6th American	—	—
2008	Phil Wheddon	5	11	2	2	8	1	7th American	—	—
2009	Phil Wheddon	5	11	3	2	8	1	8th American	—	—
2010	Phil Wheddon	6	9	5	3	6	2	6th American	—	—
2011	Phil Wheddon	7	8	3	6	5	0	3rd American	First round	—
2012	Phil Wheddon	9	7	2	6	3	1	3rd American	First round	—
2013†	Phil Wheddon	7	11	1	3	9	1	12th	—	—
2014	Phil Wheddon	5	10	4	2	7	1	11th	—	—
2015	Phil Wheddon	7	11	1	3	7	0	11th	—	—
2016	Phil Wheddon	8	8	3	1	7	2	13th	—	—
2017	Phil Wheddon	7	8	3	2	6	2	11th	—	—
2018	Phil Wheddon	3	15	0	0	10	0	14th	—	—
2019	Nicky Thrasher Adams	3	11	2	1	7	1	13th	—	—
2020	Nicky Thrasher Adams	1	7	0	1	7	0	12th	—	—
2021	Nicky Thrasher Adams	4	12	1	0	10	0	14th	—	—
2022	Nicky Thrasher Adams	8	7	3	1	6	3	13th	—	—
2023	Nicky Thrasher Adams	2	14	2	0	9	1	14th	—	—
2024	Nicky Thrasher Adams	6	10	2	0	9	1	17th	—	—
2025	Nicky Thrasher Adams	5	9	4	1	8	1	16th	—	—

^In 1997 Syracuse began play in the Big East Conference.
†In 2013 Syracuse began play in the Atlantic Coast Conference.

== Notable alumni ==
=== Current Professional Players ===
As of December 1, 2025

- (Republic of Ireland) Courtney Brosnan (2014–2017) – currently with Everton and Ireland international
- (Canada) Alex Lamontagne (2014–2017) – currently with AS Saint-Étienne
- (United States) Opal Curless (2016–2017) – currently with Marseille
- Lysianne Proulx (2017–2021) – currently with Juventus and Canada international
