= 2015 Big 12 Conference women's soccer season =

Big 12 Conference
- Season: 2015
- NCAA tournament: West Virginia; Texas Tech
- Top goalscorer: J Beckie, TT – 14

2015 Big 12 Conference women's soccer standings
	Conf.						Overall
Team	W		L		T	PCT	W		L		T	PCT
No. 7 West Virginia ‍†‍‍^{y}	6	–	0	–	1	.929	19	–	3	–	1	.848
Baylor ‍‍‍	4	–	1	–	2	.714	9	–	6	–	4	.579
Texas ‍‍‍	4	–	3	–	1	.563	8	–	6	–	4	.556
Oklahoma ‍‍‍	3	–	2	–	3	.563	10	–	7	–	3	.575
No. 21 Texas Tech ‍‍‡‍^{y}	3	–	2	–	3	.563	14	–	4	–	5	.717
Kansas ‍‍‍	3	–	4	–	2	.444	10	–	9	–	2	.524
TCU ‍‍‍	2	–	3	–	3	.438	8	–	7	–	4	.526
Oklahoma State ‍‍‍	2	–	4	–	2	.375	9	–	9	–	2	.500
Iowa State ‍‍‍	0	–	8	–	0	.000	6	–	12	–	0	.333
† – Conference champion ‡ – Tournament champion y – Invited to the NCAA tournament Rankings from NSCAA Coaches

The 2015 Big 12 Conference women's soccer season was the 20th season of women's varsity soccer in the conference.

The West Virginia Mountaineers claimed their fourth consecutive outright regular season championship, becoming the first time in Big 12 history to do so. The Texas Tech Red Raiders won their first Big 12 tournament title with a 1–0 victory over the Kansas Jayhawks in the final.

== Teams ==
=== Stadia and locations ===
Team	Location	Stadium	Capacity
Baylor Lady Bears	Waco, Texas	Betty Lou Mays Soccer Field	1,500
Iowa State Cyclones	Ames, Iowa	Cyclone Sports Complex	1,500
Kansas Jayhawks	Lawrence, Kansas	Rock Chalk Park	2,500
Oklahoma Sooners	Norman, Oklahoma	OU Soccer Complex	3,500
Oklahoma State Cowgirls	Stillwater, Oklahoma	Cowgirl Soccer Complex	1,450
TCU Horned Frogs	Fort Worth, Texas	Garvey-Rosenthal Soccer Stadium	1,500
Texas Longhorns	Austin, Texas	Mike A. Myers Stadium	20,000
Texas Tech Red Raiders	Lubbock, Texas	John Walker Soccer Complex	1,500
West Virginia Mountaineers	Morgantown, West Virginia	Dick Dlesk Soccer Stadium	1,650

== Regular season ==
=== Rankings ===
Legend
Increase in ranking
Decrease in ranking
Not ranked previous week

		Pre	Wk 1	Wk 2	Wk 3	Wk 4	Wk 5	Wk 6	Wk 7	Wk 8	Wk 9	Wk 10	Wk 11	Wk 12	Final
Baylor	C	–	–	–	–	–	–	–	–	–	–	–	–	–	–
Iowa State	C	–	–	–	–	–	–	–	–	–	–	–	–	–	–
Kansas	C	23	–	–	–	–	–	–	–	–	–	–	–	–	–
Oklahoma	C	–	–	–	–	–	–	–	–	–	–	–	–	–	–
Oklahoma State	C	–	–	–	–	–	–	–	–	–	–	–	–	–	–
TCU	C	–	–	–	–	–	–	–	–	–	–	–	–	–	–
Texas	C	–	–	–	–	–	–	–	–	–	–	–	–	–	–
Texas Tech	C	15	20	21	18	17	15	15	13	17	21	18	18	15	21
West Virginia	C	12	15	12	8	7	5	4	4	3	3	2	2	4	7

== Postseason ==
=== Big 12 tournament ===
Texas Tech claimed its first Big 12 tournament championship in 2015. Following an overtime win over Oklahoma, the Red Raiders eliminated the two-time defending tournament champions West Virginia, 1–0. Texas Tech outlasted Kansas in the final by the same score, claiming the league's automatic berth to the NCAA tournament.

Quarter-finals
1	West Virginia	2
8	Oklahoma State	1
4	Oklahoma	1
5	Texas Tech	2^{OT}
2	Baylor	1 (7)
7	Texas Christian	1 (6)
3	Texas	1
6	Kansas	2

Semi-finals
1	West Virginia	0
5	Texas Tech	1
2	Baylor	0
6	Kansas	2

Final
5	Texas Tech	1
6	Kansas	0

=== NCAA tournament ===
Seed	Region	School	1st round	2nd round	3rd round	Quarterfinals	Semi-finals	Championship
2	PSU Region	West Virginia	Duquesne, W 4–0	Northwestern, W 4–0	Loyola Marymount, W 5–2	Penn State, L 0–2		
	FSU Region	Texas Tech	North Texas, W 1–0	Auburn, L 2–3				

== All-Big 12 awards and teams ==
2015 Big 12 Women's Soccer Individual Awards
Award	Recipient(s)
Offensive Player of the Year	Janine Beckie, Texas Tech
Defensive Player of the Year	Kadeisha Buchanan, WVU
Coach of the Year	Nikki Izzo-Brown, WVU
Newcomer of the Year	Lauren Piercy, Baylor; Bianca St. Georges, WVU

2015 Big 12 Women's Soccer All-Conference Teams
First Team	Second Team	All-Freshman Team
GK – Abby Smith, Texas, Sr. D – Bobbi Clemmer, TCU, Sr. D – Maggie Bedillion, WVU, Sr. D – Kadeisha Buchanan, WVU, Jr. * MF – Liana Salazar, Kansas, Sr. MF – Allie Stephenson, OSU, Sr. MF – Ashley Lawrence, WVU, Jr. F – Janine Beckie, Texas Tech, Sr. * F – Michaela Abam, WVU, Sr. F – Kailey Utley, WVU, Sr. U – Koree Willer, Iowa State, Jr.	GK – Hannah Steadman, WVU, Sr. D – Rachel Ressler, OU, Jr. D – Natalie Calhoun, OSU, Jr. D – Bianca St. Georges, WVU, Fr. MF – Michelle Prokof, TCU, Jr. MF – Alli Murphy, Texas Tech, Sr. MF – Amanda Hill, WVU, Sr. F – Lauren Piercy, Baylor, Fr. F – Courtney Dike, OSU, Jr. F – Emma Heckendorn, TCU, So. F – Alexa Adams, Texas, Fr. U – Carla Portillo, WVU, So.	D – Bianca St. Georges, WVU; MF – Julie James, Baylor; MF – Kaylee Dao, Oklahoma; MF – Parker Roberts, Kansas; F – Alexa Adams, Texas; F – Amanda Hoglund, Baylor; F – Lauren Piercy, Baylor; F – Marlo Zoller, OSU; F – Mikayla Flores, Texas; F – Nia Gordon, WVU; F – Sarah King, Baylor
* Unanimous Selection, GK – Goalkeeper, D – Defender, MF – Midfielder, F – Forward, U – Utility

== See also ==
- 2015 NCAA Division I women's soccer season
- 2015 Big 12 Conference Women's Soccer Tournament
