= 2015 NCAA Division I women's soccer season =

NCAA Division I women's soccer
- Season: 2015
- Champions: Penn State Nittany Lions (1st title)

The 2015 NCAA Division I women's soccer season was the 34th season of NCAA championship women's college soccer. The Florida State Seminoles were the defending national champions.

== Season overview ==
=== Standings ===
2015 ACC women's soccer standings
	Conf.						Overall
Team	W		L		T	PCT	W		L		T	PCT
Virginia ‍†‍‍^{y}	9	–	1	–	0	.900	19	–	1	–	3	.891
Florida State ‍‍‡‍^{y}	6	–	1	–	3	.750	18	–	2	–	4	.833
North Carolina ‍‍‍^{y}	7	–	3	–	0	.700	15	–	5	–	1	.738
Clemson ‍‍‍^{y}	7	–	3	–	0	.700	14	–	4	–	2	.750
Virginia Tech ‍‍‍^{y}	6	–	3	–	1	.650	15	–	3	–	3	.786
Notre Dame ‍‍‍^{y}	6	–	4	–	0	.600	14	–	5	–	1	.725
Boston College ‍‍‍^{y}	5	–	3	–	2	.600	11	–	7	–	2	.600
Duke ‍‍‍^{y}	4	–	3	–	3	.550	14	–	6	–	5	.660
Louisville ‍‍‍	4	–	5	–	1	.450	8	–	8	–	2	.500
Pittsburgh ‍‍‍	4	–	6	–	0	.400	10	–	7	–	1	.583
Syracuse ‍‍‍	3	–	7	–	0	.300	7	–	11	–	1	.395
Wake Forest ‍‍‍	2	–	8	–	0	.200	5	–	12	–	2	.316
Miami ‍‍‍	2	–	8	–	0	.200	5	–	12	–	0	.294
NC State ‍‍‍	0	–	10	–	0	.000	4	–	15	–	0	.211
† – Conference champion ‡ – 2015 ACC Tournament champion y – Invited to the NCAA Tournament; Rankings from NSCAA

2015 American Athletic Conference women's soccer standings
	Conf.					Overall
Team	W		L		T	W		L		T
No. 10 Connecticut	8	–	1	–	0	17	–	2	–	0
No. 25 South Florida	6	–	2	–	1	13	–	3	–	2
UCF	6	–	3	–	0	11	–	5	–	1
Cincinnati	5	–	3	–	1	12	–	5	–	4
Tulsa	4	–	4	–	1	13	–	6	–	1
Temple	4	–	4	–	1	12	–	6	–	1
Memphis	3	–	4	–	2	8	–	7	–	3
East Carolina	3	–	5	–	1	3	–	5	–	1
SMU	2	–	6	–	1	2	–	6	–	1
Houston	0	–	9	–	0	4	–	13	–	0
+- Invited to the 2015 NCAA Division I Women's Soccer Tournament; As of November 3, 2015; Rankings from NSCAA

2015 Big 12 Conference women's soccer standings
	Conf.						Overall
Team	W		L		T	PCT	W		L		T	PCT
No. 7 West Virginia ‍†‍‍^{y}	6	–	0	–	1	.929	19	–	3	–	1	.848
Baylor ‍‍‍	4	–	1	–	2	.714	9	–	6	–	4	.579
Texas ‍‍‍	4	–	3	–	1	.563	8	–	6	–	4	.556
Oklahoma ‍‍‍	3	–	2	–	3	.563	10	–	7	–	3	.575
No. 21 Texas Tech ‍‍‡‍^{y}	3	–	2	–	3	.563	14	–	4	–	5	.717
Kansas ‍‍‍	3	–	4	–	2	.444	10	–	9	–	2	.524
TCU ‍‍‍	2	–	3	–	3	.438	8	–	7	–	4	.526
Oklahoma State ‍‍‍	2	–	4	–	2	.375	9	–	9	–	2	.500
Iowa State ‍‍‍	0	–	8	–	0	.000	6	–	12	–	0	.333
† – Conference champion ‡ – Tournament champion y – Invited to the NCAA tournament Rankings from NSCAA Coaches

2015 West Coast Conference women's soccer standings
	Conf.						Overall
Team	W		L		T	PCT	W		L		T	PCT
No. 13 BYU ‍†‍‍^{y}	7	–	1	–	1	.833	16	–	3	–	2	.810
San Francisco ‍‍‍	7	–	2	–	0	.778	13	–	4	–	3	.725
Loyola Marymount ‍‍‍^{y}	7	–	2	–	0	.778	14	–	5	–	1	.725
No. 12 Santa Clara ‍‍‍^{y}	6	–	1	–	2	.778	13	–	6	–	2	.667
Portland ‍‍‍	4	–	5	–	0	.444	8	–	11	–	0	.421
Pepperdine ‍‍‍	3	–	6	–	0	.333	8	–	9	–	2	.474
San Diego ‍‍‍	3	–	6	–	0	.333	5	–	13	–	2	.300
Saint Mary's ‍‍‍	2	–	5	–	2	.333	7	–	9	–	4	.450
Pacific ‍‍‍	2	–	7	–	0	.222	3	–	13	–	1	.206
Gonzaga ‍‍‍	1	–	7	–	1	.167	2	–	12	–	5	.237
† – Conference champion: y- Invited to the NCAA Women's Soccer Championship As of 2015-11-19 Rankings from NSCAA

== See also ==
- College soccer
- List of NCAA Division I women's soccer programs
- 2015 in American soccer
- 2015 NCAA Division I Women's Soccer Tournament
- 2015 NCAA Division I men's soccer season
