= 2015 ACC women's soccer tournament =

Tournament details
- Country: United States
- Teams: 4

Final positions
- Champions: Florida State Seminoles
- Runners-up: Virginia Cavaliers

Tournament statistics
- Matches played: 3
- Goals scored: 12 (4 per match)

Awards
- Best player: Natalia Kuikka

2015 ACC women's soccer standings
	Conf.						Overall
Team	W		L		T	PCT	W		L		T	PCT
Virginia ‍†‍‍^{y}	9	–	1	–	0	.900	19	–	1	–	3	.891
Florida State ‍‍‡‍^{y}	6	–	1	–	3	.750	18	–	2	–	4	.833
North Carolina ‍‍‍^{y}	7	–	3	–	0	.700	15	–	5	–	1	.738
Clemson ‍‍‍^{y}	7	–	3	–	0	.700	14	–	4	–	2	.750
Virginia Tech ‍‍‍^{y}	6	–	3	–	1	.650	15	–	3	–	3	.786
Notre Dame ‍‍‍^{y}	6	–	4	–	0	.600	14	–	5	–	1	.725
Boston College ‍‍‍^{y}	5	–	3	–	2	.600	11	–	7	–	2	.600
Duke ‍‍‍^{y}	4	–	3	–	3	.550	14	–	6	–	5	.660
Louisville ‍‍‍	4	–	5	–	1	.450	8	–	8	–	2	.500
Pittsburgh ‍‍‍	4	–	6	–	0	.400	10	–	7	–	1	.583
Syracuse ‍‍‍	3	–	7	–	0	.300	7	–	11	–	1	.395
Wake Forest ‍‍‍	2	–	8	–	0	.200	5	–	12	–	2	.316
Miami ‍‍‍	2	–	8	–	0	.200	5	–	12	–	0	.294
NC State ‍‍‍	0	–	10	–	0	.000	4	–	15	–	0	.211
† – Conference champion ‡ – 2015 ACC Tournament champion y – Invited to the NCAA Tournament; Rankings from NSCAA

== Qualification ==
The top four teams in the Atlantic Coast Conference earned a berth into the ACC Tournament. All rounds are held at WakeMed Soccer Park in Cary, NC.

== Bracket ==
Semi-finals
1	Virginia Cavaliers	5
4	Clemson Tigers	0
2	Florida State Seminoles	2
3	North Carolina Tar Heels	1

Championship
1	Virginia Cavaliers	2 (6)
2	Florida State Seminoles	2 (7)

== Schedule ==
=== Semi-finals ===
November 6, 2015	Virginia Cavaliers	5–0	Clemson Tigers	Cary, North Carolina
5:30 p.m. EST	McNabb 52', 57'; Latsko 79'; Shaffer 82'; Sullivan 85'	Report		Stadium: WakeMed Soccer Park; Referee: Peter Dhima

November 6, 2015	Florida State Seminoles	2–1	North Carolina Tar Heels	Cary, North Carolina
8:00 p.m. EST	Williams 22', 65'	Report	Newfield 48'	Stadium: WakeMed Soccer Park; Attendance: 5,158

=== Finals ===
November 8, 2015	Virginia Cavaliers	2–2 (a.e.t.) (6–7 p)	Florida State Seminoles	Cary, North Carolina
12:00 p.m. EST	Doniak 31', 66'	Report	Kuikka 11'; Crowley 54'	Stadium: WakeMed Soccer Park; Attendance: 3,519; Referee: John McCloskey
	Penalties
	McNabb (penalty scored); Torres (penalty scored); Shaffer (penalty scored); Sonnett (penalty scored); Doniak (penalty scored); Brandon (penalty scored); Cox (penalty missed)		Pickett (penalty scored); Connolly (penalty scored); Hahn (penalty scored); Campbell (penalty scored); Crowley (penalty scored); Williams (penalty scored); Thorvaldsdottir (penalty scored)

== All-Tournament team ==
- Joanna Boyles, North Carolina
- Cameron Castleberry, North Carolina
- Megan Connolly, Florida State
- Kristen Crowley, Florida State
- Makenzy Doniak, Virginia
- Natalia Kuikka, Florida State (MVP)
- Kristen McNabb, Virginia
- Alexa Newfield, North Carolina
- Alexis Shaffer, Virginia
- Emily Sonnett, Virginia
- Cheyna Williams, Florida State

== See also ==
- Atlantic Coast Conference
- 2015 Atlantic Coast Conference women's soccer season
- 2015 NCAA Division I women's soccer season
- 2015 NCAA Division I women's soccer tournament
