= Palisch =

Palisch is a surname. Notable people with the surname include:

- Alli Palisch (born 1994), American-born Irish footballer
- Jake Palisch (born 1998), American baseball pitcher
