= 2015 Big 12 Conference women's soccer tournament =

- Classification: Division I
- Teams: 8
- Matches: 7
- Attendance: 2,812
- Site: Swope Soccer Village; Kansas City, Missouri
- Champions: Texas Tech (1st title)
- Winning coach: Tom Stone (1st title)
- Broadcast: Fox Sports 1 (Final only)

2015 Big 12 Conference women's soccer standings
	Conf.						Overall
Team	W		L		T	PCT	W		L		T	PCT
No. 7 West Virginia ‍†‍‍^{y}	6	–	0	–	1	.929	19	–	3	–	1	.848
Baylor ‍‍‍	4	–	1	–	2	.714	9	–	6	–	4	.579
Texas ‍‍‍	4	–	3	–	1	.563	8	–	6	–	4	.556
Oklahoma ‍‍‍	3	–	2	–	3	.563	10	–	7	–	3	.575
No. 21 Texas Tech ‍‍‡‍^{y}	3	–	2	–	3	.563	14	–	4	–	5	.717
Kansas ‍‍‍	3	–	4	–	2	.444	10	–	9	–	2	.524
TCU ‍‍‍	2	–	3	–	3	.438	8	–	7	–	4	.526
Oklahoma State ‍‍‍	2	–	4	–	2	.375	9	–	9	–	2	.500
Iowa State ‍‍‍	0	–	8	–	0	.000	6	–	12	–	0	.333
† – Conference champion ‡ – Tournament champion y – Invited to the NCAA tournament Rankings from NSCAA Coaches

The 2015 Big 12 Conference women's soccer tournament was the postseason women's soccer tournament for the Big 12 Conference held from November 4 to 8, 2015. The seven-match tournament was held at the Swope Soccer Village in Kansas City, Missouri with a combined attendance of 2,812. The 8-team single-elimination tournament consisted of three rounds based on seeding from regular season conference play. The Texas Tech Red Raiders defeated the Kansas Jayhawks in the championship match to win their first conference tournament.

== Regular season standings ==
Place	Seed	Team	Conference					Overall			
Place	Seed	Team	W	L	T	%	Pts	W	L	T	%
1	1	West Virginia	6	0	1	.929	19	19	3	1	.848
2	2	Baylor	4	1	2	.714	14	9	6	4	.579
3	3	Texas	4	3	1	.563	13	8	6	4	.556
4	4	Oklahoma	3	2	3	.563	12	10	7	3	.575
4	5	Texas Tech	3	2	3	.563	12	14	4	5	.717
6	6	Kansas	3	4	2	.444	11	10	9	2	.524
7	7	TCU	2	3	3	.438	9	8	7	4	.526
8	8	Oklahoma State	2	4	2	.375	8	9	9	2	.500
9		Iowa State	0	8	0	.000	0	6	12	0	.333

== Bracket ==
Quarterfinals; Wednesday, Nov 4
1	West Virginia	2
8	Oklahoma State	1
4	Oklahoma	1
5	Texas Tech	2^{OT}
2	Baylor	1 (7)
7	Texas Christian	1 (6)
3	Texas	1
6	Kansas	2

Semifinals; Friday, Nov 6
1	West Virginia	0
5	Texas Tech	1
2	Baylor	0
6	Kansas	2

Final; Sunday, Nov 8
5	Texas Tech	1
6	Kansas	0

== Awards ==
=== Most valuable player ===
- Offensive MVP – Janine Beckie – Texas Tech
- Defensive MVP – Lauren Watson – Texas Tech

=== All-Tournament team ===
Position	Player	Team
GK	Maddie Dobyns	Kansas
GK	Lauren Watson	Texas Tech
D	Kadeisha Buchanan	West Virginia
MF	Caity Heap	Texas Tech
MF	Amanda Hill	West Virginia
MF	Alli Murphy	Texas Tech
MF	Liana Salazar	Kansas
F	Janine Beckie	Texas Tech
F	Bri Campos	Baylor
F	Gwennie Puente	Texas Tech
F	Kailey Utley	West Virginia
