= 1986 NCAA Division I men's soccer tournament =

1986 Men's College Cup

Tournament details
- Country: United States
- Venue(s): Tacoma Dome (Washington (state)) Tacoma, Washington
- Teams: 22

Final positions
- Champions: Duke (1st title)
- Runners-up: Akron
- Semifinalists: Fresno State; Harvard

Tournament statistics
- Matches played: 21
- Goals scored: 55 (2.62 per match)
- Attendance: 65,892 (3,138 per match)
- Top goal scorer(s): Tom Stone, Duke (4)

Awards
- Best player: Tom Stone, Duke (offensive); Kelly Weadock, Duke (defensive)

The 1986 NCAA Division I men's soccer tournament was the 28th annual tournament organized by the National Collegiate Athletic Association to determine the national champion of men's collegiate soccer among its Division I members in the United States.

Duke won their first national title, defeating Akron in the championship game, 1–0.

The final match was played on December 13 at the Tacoma Dome in Tacoma, Washington.

== Qualifying ==
Two teams made their debut appearances in the NCAA Division I men's soccer tournament: Loyola Maryland and Seton Hall.

== Bracket ==
First round
Harvard (OT, PK)	2
Yale	1
South Carolina	2
Duke	3
Virginia	0
Loyola Maryland	1
Maryland	1
George Mason (2OT)	2
UCLA	3
Cal State Fullerton	0
Fresno State	1
San Francisco	0
California	0
Saint Louis	2

Second round
Long Island	2
Hartwick College	3
Boston University	1
Harvard	2
NC State	0
Duke	2
Loyola (MD)	2
George Mason	0
Evansville	1
Akron (OT)	2
Seton Hall	0
Penn State (OT)	2
UCLA	0
Fresno State (OT)	1
SMU	3
Saint Louis	1

Quarterfinals
Hartwick College	0
Harvard	2
Duke	2
Loyola (MD)	1
Akron (OT, PK)	2
Penn State	1
Fresno State	1
SMU	0

Semifinals
Harvard	1
Duke	3
Akron	1
Fresno State	0

Championship
Duke	1
Akron	0

== Final ==
December 13, 1986

Duke	1–0	Akron
Tom Stone	Report 1 Report 2

Tacoma Dome, Tacoma, Washington
Attendance: 4,196

Team details

Duke
Akron

== See also ==
- 1986 NCAA Division I women's soccer tournament
- 1986 NCAA Division II soccer tournament
- 1986 NCAA Division III men's soccer tournament
- 1986 NAIA soccer championship
