= 2026 Denver Summit FC season =

Denver Summit FC's 2026 National Women's Soccer League season

Denver Summit FC
2026 season
- Head coach: Nick Cushing
- Stadium: Centennial Stadium
- NWSL: 10th of 16
- Playoffs: DNQ
- Top goalscorer: Janine Sonis (12)
- Highest home attendance: 63,004 (vs WAS, Mar 28)
- Lowest home attendance: 11,008 (vs NC, Aug 5)
- Average home league attendance: 16,690
- Biggest win: 6–1 (vs Racing Louisville (H), NWSL, July 5)
- Biggest defeat: 3 goals (2 matches, NWSL)
Home colors	Away colors
- All statistics correct as of November 1, 2026.

The 2026 season was the inaugural season of Denver Summit FC as a professional women's soccer team. The club played in the National Women's Soccer League (NWSL), the top tier of soccer in the United States. The Summit primarily played their home games at Centennial Stadium in Centennial, Colorado, but also played four home matches at Dick's Sporting Goods Park in Commerce City, Colorado, and their inaugural match at Empower Field at Mile High in Denver, Colorado.

== Summary ==
On January 30, 2025, Denver was officially awarded the expansion bid by the NWSL, joining as the league's 16th team in the 2026 season. The team will begin in the 2026 season, alongside Boston Legacy FC, which brings the NWSL to 16 teams.

In March 2025, Denver Summit FC announced plans to build a temporary stadium in Centennial that would be used during the first two seasons.

On July 22, 2025, the team's ownership announced Denver Summit FC as the team's name.

== Squad ==
As of August 5, 2026

No.	Pos.	Nation	Player
1	GK	USA	Abby Smith
2	DF	CAN	Megan Reid
3	DF	USA	Kaleigh Kurtz
4	DF	USA	Natalie Means
5	MF	USA	Devin Lynch
6	DF	CAN	Janine Sonis
7	DF	USA	Ayo Oke
8	MF	CAN	Emma Regan
9	FW	USA	Yazmeen Ryan
10	MF	USA	Lindsey Heaps
11	FW	USA	Ally Brazier
12	FW	USA	Jasmine Aikey (SEI)
13	DF	ENG	Gemma Bonner
14	MF	USA	Yuna McCormack
15	MF	USA	Jordan Baggett (ML)
16	DF	USA	Carson Pickett
17	GK	USA	Jordan Nytes
18	FW	JPN	Yuzuki Yamamoto
23	DF	USA	Eva Gaetino
24	MF	USA	Delanie Sheehan
25	FW	GER	Melissa Kössler
26	FW	ENG	Natasha Flint
30	DF	USA	Camryn Biegalski
33	FW	USA	Olivia Thomas
34	MF	USA	Meg Boade
36	GK	USA	Kat Asman (on loan from Orlando Pride)
79	FW	ESP	Nahikari García (SEI)

=== Out on loan ===
No.	Pos.	Nation	Player
21	GK	FRA	Pauline Peyraud-Magnin (on loan to Crystal Palace)
—	FW	USA	Faith Webber (on loan to Tampa Bay Sun FC)

== Competitions ==
=== Regular season ===
==== Standings ====
Pos	Team	Pld	W	D	L	GF	GA	GD	Pts	Qualification
8	Seattle Reign FC	30	14	5	11	37	33	+4	47	Playoffs
9	North Carolina Courage	30	14	3	13	52	42	+10	45	
10	Denver Summit FC	30	11	8	11	53	42	+11	41	
11	Orlando Pride	30	11	3	16	39	47	−8	36	
12	Houston Dash	30	9	6	15	38	44	−6	33	

Source: NWSL
Rules for classification: 1) points; 2) total goal difference; 3) total wins; 4) total goals scored; 5) head-to-head points; 6) head-to-head goal goals scored; 7) fewest disciplinary points; 8) coin toss (if 2 clubs tied) or drawing of lots (if ≥3 clubs tied).

==== Results summary ====
Overall								Home						Away					
Pld	W	D	L	GF	GA	GD	Pts	W	D	L	GF	GA	GD	W	D	L	GF	GA	GD
30	11	8	11	53	42	+11	41	7	4	4	33	22	+11	4	4	7	20	20	0

Last updated: November 1, 2026.
Source: NWSLsoccer.com

==== Results by matchday ====
Matchday	1	2	3	4	5	6	7	8	9	10	11	12	13	14	15	16	17	18	19	20	21	22	23	24	25	26	27	28	29	30
Ground	A	A	A	H	A	H	A	A	H	A	A	H	H	H	A	H	H	H	A	A	H	H	A	H	H	A	A	H	H	A
Result	L	D	W	D	D	L	L	W	W	L	W	L	D	W	L	D	L	W	D	L	W	W	D	D	W	L	W	L	W	L
Position	12	13	7	8	9	11	13	12	7	10	8	10	11	10	11	11	11	10	10	11	10	10	10	10	10	10	10	10	10	10

Updated to match(es) played on November 1, 2026. Source: NWSLsoccer.com
A = Away; H = Home; W = Win; D = Draw; L = Loss; P = Postponed; = NWSL Shield; = NWSL Playoffs

==== Matches ====
Win Draw Loss

March 14, 2026 1	Bay FC	2–1	Denver Summit FC	San Jose, California
3:30 p.m. PDT (UTC-7)	Pfeiffer 8'; Anderson 31', (yellow card) 51'; Barry (yellow card) 88'; Kundananji (yellow card) 90+5'	Report	Kössler 20'; Sonis (red card) 27'	Stadium: PayPal Park; Attendance: 13,110; Referee: Nabil Bensalah

March 20, 2026 2	Orlando Pride	1–1	Denver Summit FC	Orlando, Florida
8:00 p.m. MDT (UTC-6)	Banda 61'	Report	Kössler 24'; Oke (yellow card) 45+1'; Kurtz (yellow card) 56'; Flint (yellow card) 85'	Stadium: Inter&Co Stadium; Attendance: 7,076; Referee: Greg Dopka

March 25, 2026 3	Gotham FC	0–2	Denver Summit FC	Harrison, New Jersey
7:00 p.m. MDT (UTC-6)	Reale (yellow card) 39'; Howell (yellow card) 90+5'	Report	Flint (yellow card) 26', (goal) 73'; Kössler 58'; Reid (yellow card) 63'	Stadium: Sports Illustrated Stadium; Attendance: 5,000; Referee: Muhammad Hassan

March 28, 2026 4	Denver Summit FC	0–0	Washington Spirit	Denver, Colorado
12:00 p.m. MDT (UTC-6)	Kurtz (yellow card) 83'	Report	Hershfelt (yellow card) 72'	Stadium: Empower Field at Mile High; Attendance: 63,004; Referee: Joshua Encarnación

April 4, 2026 5	Seattle Reign FC	0–0	Denver Summit FC	Spokane, Washington
6:45 p.m. MDT (UTC-6)		Report		Stadium: One Spokane Stadium; Attendance: 3,952; Referee: Atahan Yaya

April 25, 2026 6	Denver Summit FC	2–3	San Diego Wave FC	Commerce City, Colorado
6:45 p.m. MDT (UTC-6)	Kössler 16'; Flint 32'; Oke (yellow card) 55'; Kurtz (yellow card) 59'; Gaetino (yellow card) 90+2'	Report	Godfrey 49'; Wesley 57'; Pickett 65' (o.g.); Morroni (yellow card) 88'	Stadium: Dick's Sporting Goods Park; Attendance: 16,932; Referee: Alex Billeter

May 3, 2026 7	Boston Legacy FC	3–2	Denver Summit FC	Foxborough, Massachusetts
2:00 p.m. MDT (UTC-6)	Prince 44'; St-Georges (yellow card) 59', (goal) 90+4'; Traoré 90'	Report	Ryan 18'; Flint 77', (yellow card) 90+4'	Stadium: Gillette Stadium; Attendance: 12,524; Referee: Jaclyn Metz

May 9, 2026 8	Houston Dash	1–4	Denver Summit FC	Houston, Texas
6:00 p.m. MDT (UTC-6)	Graham 45' (pen.); Colaprico (yellow card) 51'; Ullmark (yellow card) 74'	Report	Sonis 15', 72'; Flint 34'; Sheehan 49'	Stadium: Shell Energy Stadium; Attendance: 7,111; Referee: Laadi Issaka

May 16, 2026 9	Denver Summit FC	3–1	Orlando Pride	Commerce City, Colorado
6:45 p.m. MDT (UTC-6)	Gaetino 11'; Sonis 54' (pen.), 77'	Report	Angelina (red card) 63'; Banda (yellow card) 65', (goal) 76'	Stadium: Dick's Sporting Goods Park; Attendance: 16,974; Referee: Cristian Campo Hernández

May 23, 2026 10	Utah Royals	2–1	Denver Summit FC	Sandy, Utah
4:30 p.m. MDT (UTC-6)	Palacios 20'; Tanaka 72' (pen.)	Report	Ryan 45'; Gaetino (yellow card) 75'	Stadium: America First Field; Attendance: 19,274; Referee: Brad Jensen

May 29, 2026 11	Racing Louisville FC	0–1	Denver Summit FC	Louisville, Kentucky
6:00 p.m. MDT (UTC-6)	Milliet (yellow card) 47'	Report	Yamamoto (yellow card) 32'; Thomas (yellow card) 49'; Brazier 64'	Stadium: Lynn Family Stadium; Attendance: 6,034; Referee: Calin Radosav

July 3, 2026 12	Denver Summit FC	0–3	Kansas City Current	Commerce City, Colorado
7:30 p.m. MDT (UTC-6)	Gaetino (yellow card) 36'	Report	Cooper 35', 81'; LaBonta (penalty missed) 38'; Chawinga 87'	Stadium: Dick's Sporting Goods Park; Attendance: 16,833; Referee: Abdou Ndiaye

July 12, 2026 13	Denver Summit FC	2–2	Houston Dash	Commerce City, Colorado
5:00 p.m. MDT (UTC-6)	Ryan 14'; Sonis 45+3' (pen.)	Report	Rader 15'; Ullmark 48'	Stadium: Dick's Sporting Goods Park; Attendance: 15,131; Referee: Muhammad Hassan

July 18, 2026 14	Denver Summit FC	2–1	Portland Thorns FC	Centennial, Colorado
12:00 p.m. MDT (UTC-6)	Sonis 45+8'; Sheehan (yellow card) 80'; Means 86'	Report	Wilson 25' (pen.); Müller (yellow card) 53'	Stadium: Centennial Stadium; Attendance: 12,372; Referee: Jaclyn Metz

July 26, 2026 15	Washington Spirit	1–0	Denver Summit FC	Washington, D.C.
5:00 p.m. MDT (UTC-6)	Cantore 61'	Report	Oke (yellow card) 55'; Gaetino (yellow card) 79'; Means (yellow card) 88'	Stadium: Audi Field; Attendance: 15,169; Referee: Elton Garcia

August 2, 2026 16	Denver Summit FC	1–1	Boston Legacy FC	Centennial, Colorado
7:00 p.m. MDT (UTC-6)	Lynch (yellow card) 65'; Sonis 72' (pen.)	Report	Smith 34'	Stadium: Centennial Stadium; Attendance: 12,380; Referee: Mark Verso

August 5, 2026 17	Denver Summit FC	0–2	North Carolina Courage	Centennial, Colorado
8:00 p.m. MDT (UTC-6)		Report	Parkinson (yellow card) 43'; Jackson 48' (pen.); Schlegel 81'; Jacobs (yellow card) 89'	Stadium: Centennial Stadium; Attendance: 11,008; Referee: Shawn Tehini

August 8, 2026 18	Denver Summit FC	2–1	Utah Royals	Centennial, Colorado
8:00 p.m. MDT (UTC-6)	Ryan 51'; Smith (yellow card) 75'; Sonis 90+4'	Report	Tejada (yellow card) 41'; Milazzo 89'	Stadium: Centennial Stadium; Attendance: 12,380; Referee: Gerald Flores

August 14, 2026 19	San Diego Wave FC	1–1	Denver Summit FC	San Diego, California
8:00 p.m. MDT (UTC-6)	Barcenas 35'; Harbert (yellow card) 79'; Leon (yellow card) 90+1'	Report	Ryan 58'; Regan (yellow card) 90+3'	Stadium: Snapdragon Stadium; Attendance: 13,463; Referee: Lauren Aldrich

August 22, 2026 20	Portland Thorns FC	1–0	Denver Summit FC	Portland, Oregon
6:45 p.m. MDT (UTC-6)	Perry (yellow card) 22'; Wilson 44'; Hanks (yellow card) 90+1'	Report		Stadium: Providence Park; Attendance: 22,017; Referee: Nabil Bensalah

August 29, 2026 21	Denver Summit FC	6–1	Chicago Stars FC	Centennial, Colorado
6:45 p.m. MDT (UTC-6)	Sonis 12'; Kössler 19', 58'; Yamamoto 47'; Flint 56'; Thomas 85'	Report	Ouahabi (yellow card) 41'; Grosso 53'	Stadium: Centennial Stadium; Attendance: 12,372; Referee: Edson Carvajal

September 6, 2026 22	Denver Summit FC	3–0	Gotham FC	Centennial, Colorado
12:00 p.m. MDT (UTC-6)	Yamamoto 50'; Thomas 82'; Ryan 88'	Report		Stadium: Centennial Stadium; Attendance: 12,372; Referee: Calin Radosav

September 11, 2026 23	Angel City FC	3–3	Denver Summit FC	Los Angeles, California
8:00 p.m. MDT (UTC-6)	Niehues 45'; Chilufya 63'; Sentnor 74' (pen.)	Report	Yamamoto 49'; Heaps 50', (yellow card) 71'; Sonis 61'; Oke (yellow card) 73'	Stadium: BMO Stadium; Attendance: 15,062; Referee: Brandon Stevis

September 16, 2026 24	Denver Summit FC	2–2	Bay FC	Centennial, Colorado
7:30 p.m. MDT (UTC-6)	Heaps 42'; Sonis 57'	Report	Hutton 73'; Huff (yellow card) 79', (goal) 90+5'; Barry (yellow card) 90+7'	Stadium: Centennial Stadium; Attendance: 11,571; Referee: Marie Durr

September 19, 2026 25	Denver Summit FC	2–1	Seattle Reign FC	Centennial, Colorado
7:50 p.m. MDT (UTC-6)	Sheehan 44'; Flint 50'; Smith (yellow card) 80'	Report	Huerta (yellow card) 45+2'; Ratcliffe 55'; Menti (yellow card) 73'; McClernon (yellow card) 74'	Stadium: Centennial Stadium; Attendance: 12,272; Referee: Danielle Chesky
Note: Kickoff delayed from 6:45 p.m. MDT by weather.

September 26, 2026 26	Kansas City Current	4–1	Denver Summit FC	Kansas City, Missouri
11:30 a.m. MDT (UTC-6)	Hopkins 39', 47', 57'; Chawinga 76'	Report	Sheehan (yellow card) 6'; Heaps 13'	Stadium: CPKC Stadium; Attendance: 11,500; Referee: John Griggs

October 4, 2026 27	Chicago Stars FC	0–3	Denver Summit FC	Evanston, Illinois
2:00 p.m. MDT (UTC-6)	Alozie (yellow card) 20'	Report	Sonis 8'; Heaps 26', 76'	Stadium: Martin Stadium; Attendance: 4,614; Referee: Jamie Padilla

October 17, 2026 28	Denver Summit FC	2–3	Angel City FC	Centennial, Colorado
6:45 p.m. MDT (UTC-6)	Kössler 2'; Heaps 18'; Regan (yellow card) 64'; Lynch (yellow card) 74'	Report	Ary Borges (yellow card) 22'; Jónsdóttir 32'; Suarez 39'; Sentnor 43', (yellow card) 88'	Stadium: Centennial Stadium; Attendance: 12,372; Referee: Katja Koroleva

October 24, 2026 29	Denver Summit FC	6–1	Racing Louisville FC	Centennial, Colorado
4:30 p.m. MDT (UTC-6)	Flint 19', 68'; Kurtz 45+2'; Kössler 59'; Heaps 66'; Ryan 81'	Report	White 79'	Stadium: Centennial Stadium; Attendance: 12,372; Referee: Brad Jensen

November 1, 2026 30	North Carolina Courage	1–0	Denver Summit FC	Cary, North Carolina
3:00 p.m. MST (UTC-7)	Kurtz 90+4' (o.g.)	Report	Smith (yellow card) 30'; Regan (yellow card) 78'	Stadium: WakeMed Soccer Park; Attendance: 10,803; Referee: Nabil Bensalah

== Statistics ==
As of August 14, 2026

=== Appearances and goals ===
Starting appearances are listed first, followed by substitute appearances after the + symbol where applicable.

No.	Pos	Nat	Player	Total		NWSL	
No.	Pos	Nat	Player	Apps	Goals	Apps	Goals
Goalkeepers
1	GK	(United States) USA	Abby Smith	19	0	19	0
17	GK	(United States) USA	Jordan Nytes	0	0	0	0
21	GK	(France) FRA	Pauline Peyraud-Magnin	0	0	0	0
36	GK	(United States) USA	Kat Asman	0	0	0	0
Defenders
2	DF	(Canada) CAN	Megan Reid	9	0	5+4	0
3	DF	(United States) USA	Kaleigh Kurtz	19	0	19	0
4	DF	(United States) USA	Natalie Means	16	1	6+10	1
6	DF	(Canada) CAN	Janine Sonis	18	8	18	8
7	DF	(United States) USA	Ayo Oke	18	0	15+3	0
16	DF	(United States) USA	Carson Pickett	13	0	8+5	0
23	DF	(United States) USA	Eva Gaetino	17	1	14+3	1
30	DF	(United States) USA	Camryn Biegalski	0	0	0	0
Midfielders
5	MF	(United States) USA	Devin Lynch	19	0	19	0
8	MF	(Canada) CAN	Emma Regan	15	0	4+11	0
10	MF	(United States) USA	Lindsey Heaps	3	0	3	0
14	MF	(United States) USA	Yuna McCormack	16	0	7+9	0
15	MF	(United States) USA	Jordan Baggett	0	0	0	0
19	MF	(Mexico) MEX	Lourdes Bosch	0	0	0	0
24	MF	(United States) USA	Delanie Sheehan	17	1	16+1	1
34	MF	(United States) USA	Meg Boade	0	0	0	0
Forwards
9	FW	(United States) USA	Yazmeen Ryan	18	5	18	5
11	FW	(United States) USA	Ally Brazier	16	1	5+11	1
12	FW	(United States) USA	Jasmine Aikey	0	0	0	0
18	FW	(Japan) JPN	Yuzuki Yamamoto	5	0	2+3	0
25	FW	(Germany) GER	Melissa Kössler	18	4	14+4	4
26	FW	(England) ENG	Tash Flint	17	4	13+4	4
33	FW	(United States) USA	Olivia Thomas	15	0	4+11	0
79	FW	(Spain) ESP	Nahikari Garcia	1	0	0+1	0

== Transactions ==
=== Loans in ===
Date	Player	Pos.	Loaned from	Fee/notes	Ref.
January 30, 2026	(England) Natasha Flint	FW	(United States) Tampa Bay Sun	Loaned through March 2026, with an option to buy	

=== Loans out ===
Date	Player	Pos.	Loaned to	Fee/notes	Ref.
August 19, 2025	(United States) Ally Brazier	FW	(United States) Orlando Pride	Loaned through the 2025 NWSL season	
August 21, 2025	(Mexico) Lourdes Bosch	MF	(Mexico) Monterrey	Loaned until January 2026	
September 4, 2025	(Spain) Nahikari García	FW	(England) Nottingham Forest	Loaned until January 2026	
January 30, 2026	(United States) Faith Webber	FW	(United States) Tampa Bay Sun	Loaned through the 2025–26 USL Super League season	
August 5, 2026	(France) Pauline Peyraud-Magnin	GK	(England) Crystal Palace FC	Loaned through the 2026-27 Women's Super League season	

=== Transfers in ===
Date	Player	Pos.	Previous club	Fee/notes	Contract until	Ref.
August 19, 2025	(United States) Ally Brazier	FW	(United States) Orlando Pride	Traded for $75,000 in allocation money and $37,500 in transfer funds	2026	
August 21, 2025	(Mexico) Lourdes Bosch	MF	(Australia) Melbourne City	Undisclosed transfer	2027	
September 4, 2025	(Spain) Nahikari García	FW	(Spain) Athletic Bilbao	Free agent signing	2027	
November 13, 2025	(United States) Kaleigh Kurtz	DF	(United States) North Carolina Courage	Free agent signing	2028	
November 17, 2025	(Canada) Megan Reid	DF	(United States) Angel City FC	Free agent signing	2028	
December 3, 2025	(United States) Abby Smith	GK	(United States) Houston Dash	Free agent signing	2027 + mutual option	
December 11, 2025	(United States) Camryn Biegalski	DF	(United States) Chicago Stars	Free agent signing	2027 + mutual option	
December 22, 2025	(United States) Carson Pickett	DF	(United States) Orlando Pride	Free agent signing	2027	
January 6, 2026	(United States) Ayo Oke	DF	(Mexico) Pachuca	Undisclosed transfer	2028	
January 9, 2026	(Canada) Janine Sonis	DF	(United States) Racing Louisville	Traded for a minimum of $120,000 in transfer funds	2028	
January 8, 2026	(United States) Jasmine Aikey	FW	(United States) Stanford Cardinal	College signing	2027 + mutual option	
January 10, 2026	(United States) Yuna McCormack	MF	(United States) Florida State Seminoles	College signing	2028	
January 12, 2026	(United States) Lindsey Heaps	MF	(France) OL Lyonnes	Free agent signing. Will join team in June 2026	2029	
January 14, 2026	(Canada) Emma Regan	MF	(Canada) AFC Toronto	Undisclosed transfer	2028 + mutual option	
January 15, 2026	(Germany) Melissa Kössler	FW	(Germany) TSG Hoffenheim	Undisclosed transfer	2027	
January 16, 2026	(United States) Natalie Means	DF	(United States) Georgetown Hoyas	College signing	2027	
January 16, 2026	(United States) Jordan Nytes	GK	(United States) Colorado Buffaloes	College signing	2026	
January 16, 2026	(United States) Devin Lynch	MF	(United States) Duke Blue Devils	College signing	2026	
January 16, 2026	(United States) Faith Webber	FW	(United States) Utah Valley Wolverines	College signing	2026	
January 20, 2026	(United States) Olivia Thomas	FW	(United States) North Carolina Tar Heels	College signing	2028 + mutual option	
January 31, 2026	(United States) Eva Gaetino	DF	(France) Paris Saint-Germain	Undisclosed transfer	2028	
February 14, 2026	(France) Pauline Peyraud-Magnin	GK	(Italy) Juventus	Free agent signing	2027	
March 10, 2026	(United States) Meg Boade	MF	(United States) Chicago Stars	Free agent signing	2026	
August 1, 2026	(England) Gemma Bonner	DF	(England) Liverpool	Free agent signing	2026	

=== Transfers out ===
Date	Player	Pos.	Destination club	Fee/notes	Ref.
August 12, 2026	(Mexico) Lourdes Bosch	FW	(Mexico) C.F. Monterrey	Transferred in exchange for an agreed upon fee	

== See also ==
- 2026 National Women's Soccer League season
- 2026 in American soccer
