= 2015 Clemson Tigers women's soccer team =

American college soccer season

2015 Clemson Tigers women's soccer

ACC Tournament, Semifinalists

NCAA Tournament, Second Round
- Conference: Atlantic Coast Conference
- Record: 14–4–2 (7–3–0 ACC)
- Head coach: Eddie Radwanski (5th season)
- Assistant coaches: Jeff Robbins (5th season); Siri Mullinix (5th season)
- Home stadium: Riggs Field

2015 ACC women's soccer standings
| | Conf. | | | | | | Overall |
| Team | W | | L | | T | PCT | W | | L | | T | PCT |
|---|---|---|---|---|---|---|---|---|---|---|---|---|
| Virginia ‍†‍‍^{y} | 9 | – | 1 | – | 0 | .900 | 19 | – | 1 | – | 3 | .891 |
| Florida State ‍‍‡‍^{y} | 6 | – | 1 | – | 3 | .750 | 18 | – | 2 | – | 4 | .833 |
| North Carolina ‍‍‍^{y} | 7 | – | 3 | – | 0 | .700 | 15 | – | 5 | – | 1 | .738 |
| Clemson ‍‍‍^{y} | 7 | – | 3 | – | 0 | .700 | 14 | – | 4 | – | 2 | .750 |
| Virginia Tech ‍‍‍^{y} | 6 | – | 3 | – | 1 | .650 | 15 | – | 3 | – | 3 | .786 |
| Notre Dame ‍‍‍^{y} | 6 | – | 4 | – | 0 | .600 | 14 | – | 5 | – | 1 | .725 |
| Boston College ‍‍‍^{y} | 5 | – | 3 | – | 2 | .600 | 11 | – | 7 | – | 2 | .600 |
| Duke ‍‍‍^{y} | 4 | – | 3 | – | 3 | .550 | 14 | – | 6 | – | 5 | .660 |
| Louisville ‍‍‍ | 4 | – | 5 | – | 1 | .450 | 8 | – | 8 | – | 2 | .500 |
| Pittsburgh ‍‍‍ | 4 | – | 6 | – | 0 | .400 | 10 | – | 7 | – | 1 | .583 |
| Syracuse ‍‍‍ | 3 | – | 7 | – | 0 | .300 | 7 | – | 11 | – | 1 | .395 |
| Wake Forest ‍‍‍ | 2 | – | 8 | – | 0 | .200 | 5 | – | 12 | – | 2 | .316 |
| Miami ‍‍‍ | 2 | – | 8 | – | 0 | .200 | 5 | – | 12 | – | 0 | .294 |
| NC State ‍‍‍ | 0 | – | 10 | – | 0 | .000 | 4 | – | 15 | – | 0 | .211 |
† – Conference champion ‡ – 2015 ACC Tournament champion y – Invited to the NCAA Tournament; Rankings from NSCAA

The 2015 Clemson Tigers women's soccer team represented Clemson University during the 2015 NCAA Division I women's soccer season. The Tigers were led by head coach Ed Radwanski, in his fifth season. They played home games at Riggs Field. Riggs Field celebrated its 100th anniversary this year, in October.

== Roster ==
Updated November 13, 2015

Note: Flags indicate national team as defined under FIFA eligibility rules; some limited exceptions apply. Players may hold more than one non-FIFA nationality.

| No. | Pos. | Nation | Player |
|---|---|---|---|
| 1 | GK | (Canada) CAN | Kailen Sheridan |
| 2 | FW | (United States) USA | Miranda Weslake |
| 3 | MF | (United States) USA | Tina Shakes |
| 4 | MF | (United States) USA | Katie Sprouse |
| 5 | DF | (United States) USA | Claire Wagner |
| 6 | MF | (United States) USA | Lauren Harkes |
| 7 | MF | (United States) USA | Shannon Horgan |
| 8 | FW | (United States) USA | Page Reckert |
| 9 | FW | (United States) USA | Salma Anastasio |
| 10 | FW | (United States) USA | Alana Hockenhull |
| 11 | MF | (United States) USA | Catrina Atanda |
| 14 | MF | (United States) USA | Allie Kington |
| 15 | DF | (United States) USA | Sam Staab |

| No. | Pos. | Nation | Player |
|---|---|---|---|
| 18 | MF | (United States) USA | Jeni Erickson |
| 19 | MF | (United States) USA | Jenna Polonsky |
| 20 | DF | (United States) USA | Jenna Weston |
| 21 | MF | (United States) USA | Abby Jones |
| 22 | MF | (United States) USA | Ellen Colborn |
| 23 | MF | (United States) USA | Tori Andreski |
| 24 | GK | (United States) USA | Anna Davis |
| 26 | GK | (United States) USA | Hunter Rittgers |
| 27 | DF | (United States) USA | Gabby Byorth |
| 28 | DF | (United States) USA | Emily Byorth |
| 30 | FW | (United States) USA | Patrice DiPasquale |
| 33 | DF | (United States) USA | Stefanie Spitz |

== Schedule ==
| Date Time, TV | Rank^{#} | Opponent^{#} | Result | Record | Site City, State |
Regular season
| August 23* | | at College of Charleston | W 2–0 | 1–0–0 | Patriots Point Sports Complex (917); Charleston, SC |
| August 28* | No. 17 | No. 8 South Carolina | W 2–1 | 2–0–0 | Riggs Field (1,823); Clemson, SC |
| August 30* | No. 17 | UNCW | W 2–1 | 3–0–0 | Riggs Field (257); Clemson, SC |
| September 4* | No. 10 | at University of Georgia | W 1–0 | 4–0–0 | Tuner Soccer Complex (2,311); Athens, GA |
| September 7* | No. 10 | at Wofford | W 5–1 | 5–0–0 | Snyder Field (728); Spartanburg, SC |
| September 11* | No. 8 | Pennsylvania | W 2–1 | 6–0–0 | Riggs Field (737); Clemson, SC |
| September 13* | No. 8 | University of South Florida | T 0–0 ^{2OT} | 6–0–1 | Riggs Field (293); Clemson, SC |
| September 19 | No. 10 | No. 5 Notre Dame | W 1–0 ^{2OT} | 7–0–1 (1–0–0) | Riggs Field (563); Clemson, SC |
| September 24 | No. 5 | No. 3 Florida State | L 1–3 | 7–1–1 (1–1–0) | Soccer Complex (1,250); Tallahassee, FL |
| September 27 | No. 5 | at University of Miami | W 2–1 ^{2OT} | 8–1–1 (2–1–0) | Cobb Stadium (402); Coral Gables, FL |
| October 2 | No. 6 | Wake Forest | W 2–0 | 9–1–1 (3–1–0) | Riggs Field (1,128); Clemson, SC |
| October 8 | No. 5 | No. 3 University of Virginia | L 0–2 | 9–2–1 (3–2–0) | Riggs Field (767); Clemson, SC |
| October 11 | No. 5 | No. 9 Virginia Tech | W 3–2 | 10–2–1 (4–2–0) | Riggs Field (329); Clemson, SC |
| October 16 | No. 2 | University of Pittsburgh; Senior Night | W 2–0 | 11–2–1 (5–2–0) | Riggs Field (609); Clemson, SC |
| October 22 | No. 6 | at North Carolina State | W 4–1 | 12–2–1 (6–2–0) | Dail Soccer Field (376); Raleigh, NC |
| October 25 | No. 6 | No. 9 North Carolina | L 0–1 | 12–3–1 (6–3–0) | Fetzer Field (1,712); Chapel Hill, NC |
| October 31 | No. 7 | Syracuse | W 1–0 | 13–3–1 (7–3–0) | SU Soccer Stadium (834); Syracuse, NY |
ACC Tournament
| November 06 | No. 6 | No. 1 Virginia; ACC Semifinal | L 0–5 | 13–4–1 | WakeMed Soccer Park; Raleigh, NC |
NCAA Tournament
| November 06* | No. 7 | Furman; NCAA First Round | W 3–0 | 14–4–1 | Riggs Field (770); Clemson, SC |
| November 20* | No. 7 | Ole Miss; NCAA Second Round | T 1–1 (4–5 PK) ^{2OT} | 14–4–2 | Riggs Field (788); Clemson, SC |
*Non-conference game. ^{#}Rankings from United Soccer Coaches. (#) Tournament seedings in parentheses.
