= Tom Stone (soccer) =

American soccer player and coach (born 1966)

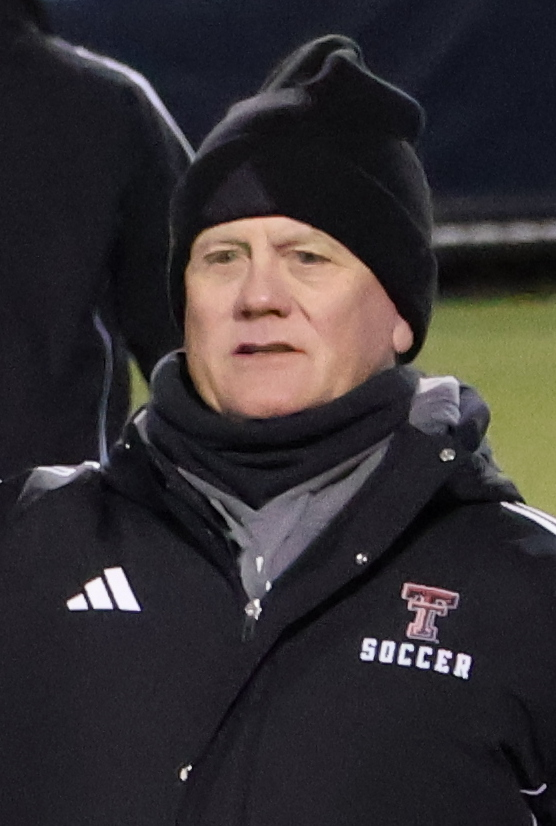
- Stone with Texas Tech in 2024

Personal information
- Full name: Thomas Fitzgerald Stone
- Date of birth: January 17, 1966 (age 60)
- Place of birth: Scott Air Force Base, Belleville, Illinois, U.S.
- Height: 6 ft 0 in (1.83 m)
- Positions: Midfielder; forward

Team information
- Current team: Texas Tech Red Raiders (women's head coach)

Youth career
- Texas Longhorns (Dallas)
- –1984: MacArthur Cardinals

College career
| Years | Team | Apps | (Gls) |
| 1984–1987 | Duke Blue Devils | | |

Senior career*
| Years | Team | Apps | (Gls) |
- Le Havre
| 1989–1990 | Washington Stars | | |
| 1990–1994 | Colorado Foxes | 17 | (0) |

Managerial career
- 1991–2000: Colorado Rush Soccer Club (director)
- 1996–2000: Denver Diamonds
- 1996: Denver Pioneers (women; vol. asst.)
- 1997: Duke Blue Devils (women; vol. asst.)
- 1999: United States (women; scout)
- 2001–2003: Atlanta Beat
- 2003–200?: Top Hat Soccer Club
- 2006: Clemson Tigers (women; asst.)
- 2007–: Texas Tech Red Raiders (women)
- 2008–2010: United States U20 (women)
- 2015: United States (women; scout)
- * Club domestic league appearances and goals

Thomas Fitzgerald Stone (born January 17, 1966) is an American former soccer player who is the current head coach of the Texas Tech women's soccer team. He played and coached soccer at the youth, collegiate and professional levels. Stone, a former graduate of Duke University and member of Sigma Alpha Epsilon, held various coaching positions before coming to Tech.

On December 14, 2019, Stone was honored as the commencement speaker at the Texas Tech Winter Commencement Ceremony.

== Playing career ==
Tom Stone played youth soccer for the Texas Longhorns in Dallas, where he was instrumental in seeing the team compete in the U.S. Youth Soccer finals. Later, he attended Duke University. As a player for the Duke Blue Devils, Stone scored the only goal in the 1986 National Championship game, giving his team the win over Akron. In January 2019, Stone and his 1986 Duke team were inducted into the North Carolina Soccer Hall of Fame.

Stone went on to play professionally for Le Havre FC, the Washington Stars, and the Colorado Foxes.

== Coaching career ==
=== Early jobs (1996–2007) ===
Stone's first coaching job was as a part-time assistant at the University of Denver in 1996 and as a volunteer assistant at Duke in 1997. Then, from 1997 to 2000, Stone coached girls' soccer for the Colorado Rush youth soccer club. Under his leadership, the team won 35 state cups, twelve regional championships and eight national championships. He left the Rush to coach professionally in the Women's United Soccer Association, leading the Atlanta Beat to the league's inaugural championship game, losing in overtime on penalty kicks to the Bay Area CyberRays. He also provided soccer commentary for Fox Sports, ESPN and CBS College Sports Network. Stone returned to college coaching when he was hired as an assistant for the Clemson Tigers. He spent one year there, helping the Tigers to an 11–8–4 record and an appearance in the Elite Eight of the NCAA Women's Soccer Championship.

=== Texas Tech (2007–present) ===
On May 25, 2007, Stone was named the fourth head coach in Texas Tech soccer history. Prior to his arrival at Texas Tech, the team had a record of 6–63–1 in Big 12 play and had gone 0–10–0 in conference four of the previous six seasons. In Stone's first year and half as coach, the team quickly matched that win total, going 6–5–1 in conference play. In 2010 – Stone's fourth year with the team – the Red Raiders went 11–8–1, marking the program's third-ever winning record and first in 15 seasons. Two years later, the Red Raiders made the NCAA Tournament for the first time in program history and beat North Texas, 2–0, in the program's debut in postseason play. They would lose to Florida State, 2–3, in double overtime in the second round.

In 2013, the Red Raiders made another appearance in the second round after recording a program-record 18 wins. In 2014, Stone's squad won 16 games and climbed as high as sixth in the national coaches' polls before advancing to the program's first-ever Sweet Sixteen. For the breakout campaign, he was named the NSCAA Central Region Coach of the Year. In 2015, the Red Raiders won their first-ever Big 12 Championship, defeating Kansas, 1–0. The year also saw Stone pick up his 100th win at the helm of the Red Raider program when the team beat South Florida, 2–1.

The Red Raiders went .500 the following two seasons – and missed the tournament altogether in 2017 – but came back to go 14–5–3 in 2018, beating a program-record four ranked opponents and leading the nation in shutouts with 14 in the process. As of 2018, Stone has led Texas Tech to the NCAA Tournament in six of the last seven seasons.

On October 3, 2019, Tom Stone got his 150th career win with a 1–0 overtime game at Iowa State. The only goal was scored by Sierra Jones.

== National team involvement ==
In addition to coaching at the collegiate level, Stone has served as an advance scout for the United States Women's National Team (USWNT) since 1999. Most recently, Stone was responsible for the scouting of USWNT opponents at the 2015 and 2019 FIFA Women's World Cup.

== Head coaching record ==
| Season | W | L | T | Final Ranking |
|---|---|---|---|---|
| 2007 | 7 | 8 | 2 | NR |
| 2008 | 8 | 10 | 1 | NR |
| 2009 | 8 | 8 | 4 | NR |
| 2010 | 11 | 8 | 1 | NR |
| 2011 | 10 | 8 | 2 | NR |
| 2012 | 16 | 6 | 1 | 25th |
| 2013 | 18 | 2 | 3 | 17th |
| 2014 | 16 | 4 | 2 | 14th |
| 2015 | 15 | 4 | 5 | 21st |
| 2016 | 9 | 9 | 2 | NR |
| 2017 | 9 | 7 | 3 | NR |
| 2018 | 14 | 5 | 3 | 24th |
| 2019 | 15 | 4 | 3 | 20th |
| 2020 | 5 | 6 | 2 | |
| 2021 | 11 | 6 | 3 | |
| 2022 | 9 | 4 | 6 | |
| 2023 | 16 | 1 | 5 | 9th |
| 2024 | 15 | 5 | 2 | 24th |
| Total | 212 | 105 | 50 | |

== Honors ==
Texas Tech Red Raiders

- Big 12 Tournament Championship: 2015
- Big 12 Conference Champions: 2023

Individual

- NSCAA Central Region Coach of the Year: 2014
- 2023 Big 12 Coach of the Year: Tom Stone, Texas Tech

== Notable players coached ==
=== Texas Tech ===
| Player | Years | Professional Club | Nationality |
|---|---|---|---|
| Janine Beckie | 2012–2015 | Manchester City Canadian National Team | (Canada) |
| Caity Heap | 2012–2015 | Mallbackens IF | (United States) |
| Jaelene Hinkle | 2011–2014 | North Carolina Courage | (United States) |
| Taylor Lytle | 2008–2011 | Utah Royals FC | (United States) |
| Victoria Esson | 2011–2013 | Avaldsnes IL New Zealand National Team | (New Zealand) |
