= Megan Connolly (footballer) =

Irish footballer

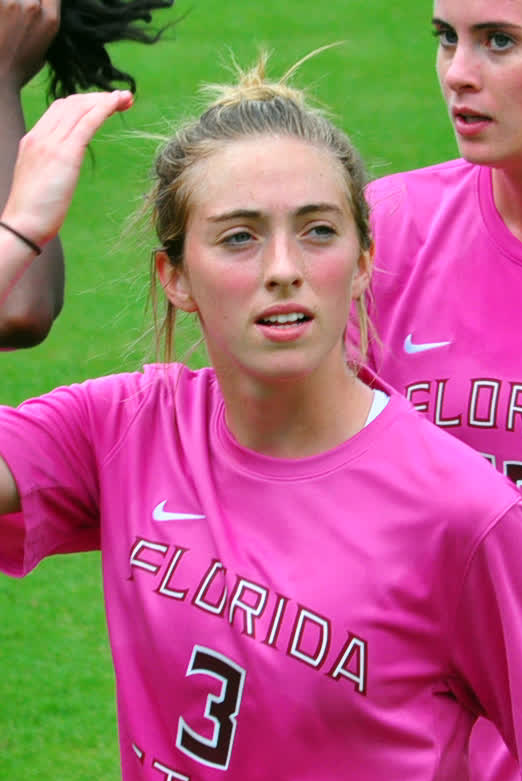
- Megan Connolly in October 2015

Personal information
- Full name: Megan Jane Connolly
- Date of birth: 7 March 1997 (age 29)
- Place of birth: Cork, Ireland
- Height: 1.73 m (5 ft 8 in)
- Positions: Midfielder; forward

Team information
- Current team: Lazio
- Number: 7

Youth career
- 2003–2015: College Corinthians
- 2010–2015: Christ King Girls

College career
Years	Team	Apps	(Gls)
2015–2019	Florida State Seminoles	64	(19)

Senior career*
Years	Team	Apps	(Gls)
2014–2015	College Corinthians	0	(0)
2019–2023	Brighton & Hove Albion	63	(4)
2023–2024	Bristol City	22	(1)
2024–	Lazio	35	(1)

International career^{‡}
2013–2014	Republic of Ireland U17	12	(9)
2014–2016	Republic of Ireland U19	13	(9)
2016–	Republic of Ireland	72	(4)
- * Club domestic league appearances and goals as of 18 October 2026 ‡ National team caps and goals as of 4 May 2026

Megan Jane Connolly (born 7 March 1997) is an Irish professional footballer who plays as a midfielder for Italian Serie A Femminile side Lazio and the Republic of Ireland women's national team. She previously played for College Corinthians, Women's Super League club Brighton & Hove Albion, where she had signed her first professional contract, and Bristol City, where she was captain.

== Early life ==
Connolly began playing association football with College Corinthians at the age of six. Initially she played with boys' teams before her father helped set up teams for girls. She also showed potential as a Gaelic footballer, playing for Nemo Rangers GAA. In 2012, she was a member of the Cork GAA U-16 Ladies team that won the Munster U-16 Ladies' Championship. Connolly scored a hat-trick in the final as Cork beat Kerry by 5–6 to 0–10. In interviews, Connolly credited her Gaelic football training for helping her with general fitness. She eventually opted to concentrate on association football because it gave her the opportunity to represent Ireland at international level.

Playing association football as a schoolgirl, Connolly won honours at provincial and national level, representing both Corinthians and her high school, Christ King Girls Secondary School. On 16 November 2014, Connolly was a member of the College Corinthians senior women's team that won the Women's Munster Senior Cup. Her father, Michael Connolly, was the coach of the team and Connolly scored in the final.

== College career ==
=== Florida State Seminoles ===
In 2015, Connolly began playing for Florida State Seminoles after obtaining a four-year scholarship to Florida State University to study sports management. Compatriot Megan Campbell was involved in her recruitment. In her first season playing for the Seminoles, Connolly played a pivotal role in their 2015 ACC Women's Soccer Tournament success, contributing nine goals and ten assists. She subsequently received a number of individual awards including ACC Midfielder of the Year and ACC Freshman of the Year.

In December 2015, Connolly was named a First Team All-American by the National Soccer Coaches Association of America for her performances during the season, becoming the first ever freshman player from Florida State to do so. She was also nominated for the Hermann Trophy.

As a sophomore, Connolly played and started in all 22 games. She scored a total of seven goals, including five game-winners, and provided four assists. As a junior, she played in 20 games, starting nine, and finished fourth on the team with nine points on three goals and three assists.

== Club career ==
Returning from the US, Connolly signed a contract with Women's Super League side Brighton & Hove Albion on 26 January 2019 for the remainder of the season. She re-signed with Brighton for another year in July 2020.

Connolly spent four seasons at Brighton before signing for newly promoted FA Women's Championship winners Bristol City ahead of the 2023–24 season, being named captain off the back of her 2023 FIFA Women's World Cup experience with Ireland in Australia. Connolly played all 22 league games for the Robins as they finished bottom and were relegated, their limited budget seeing them win only one league game all season, 3–2 at West Ham United. Connolly's only goal for the club came in a 7–3 home loss to her former club Brighton.

Released from Bristol City after their relegation, Connolly swapped England for Italy at the start of the 2024–25 season, signing for newly promoted Serie A Femminile side Lazio on 9 August 2024. She made her debut for her new club in their opening game of the season, a 2-2 Derby della Capitale draw against Roma.

Lazio won one of their first ten league games in Serie A to lie in the bottom half of the table in seventh place after the first half of the regular season. Their second derby of the season against Roma ending in a 2–1 defeat.

== International career ==
Connolly has represented the Republic of Ireland at U-15, U-16, U-17, U-19 and senior level. She has been a regular goalscorer at youth international level. On 6 August 2013 during a 2014 UEFA Women's Under-17 Championship qualifier, Connolly scored a hat-trick in a 12–1 win against Bosnia and Herzegovina. Connolly was also a member of the Republic of Ireland team that won their group at the 2014 UEFA Women's Under-19 Championship and qualified for the semi-finals. On 21 July 2014, Connolly scored a "wondrous free kick" which proved to be the winner in a 2–1 win against Sweden. This earned the Republic of Ireland their place in the semi–final. With three assists, including two against England, and this goal, Connolly was described as "one of the stars of the tournament".

In 2014, she was named the Under-19 Women's International Player of the Year at the FAI International Football Awards and was presented with the award by Shay Given. On 17 September 2015, she scored four goals against Bulgaria in a 2016 UEFA Women's Under-19 Championship qualifier. Connolly was included in the senior Republic of Ireland squad for the 2015 Istria Cup. She made her senior international debut for the Republic of Ireland in a friendly against the United States on 23 January 2016. Connolly came on as a substitute for Ruesha Littlejohn after 65 minutes. The United States won 5–0.

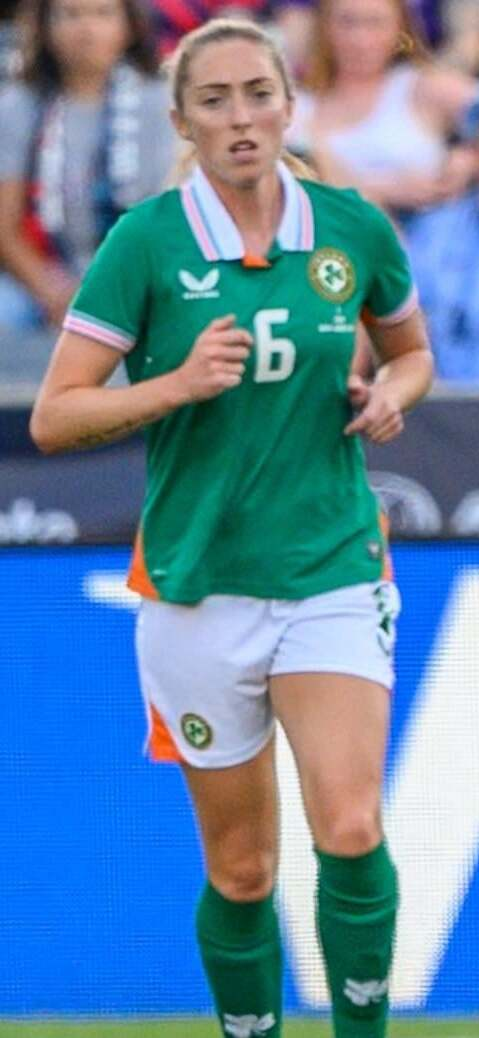
Connolly with the Republic of Ireland in 2025

Connolly was part of the Irish squad for the country's inaugural FIFA Women's World Cup appearance in the 2023 edition in Australia and New Zealand. During the team's second group stage match against Canada, with Ireland leading by a goal, Connolly scored an own goal after inadvertently deflecting Julia Grosso's cross attempt into her own net. This equalizer allowed Canada to eventually win 2–1, eliminating Ireland from the tournament. Manager Vera Pauw defended Connolly, saying “She hardly touched the ball trying to save it and was very unfortunate. We do not blame players ever, mistakes are part of the game."

== Personal life ==
Connolly was raised in Cork, Ireland and is the daughter of Michael and Freda Connolly. Her father was a volunteer coach at College Corinthians and, after Megan began to show potential, he was responsible for reintroducing women's association football to the club. Her older brother Luke is also a footballer, playing association football for Corinthians and Gaelic football for Nemo Rangers GAA and UCC GAA.

== Career statistics ==
=== Club ===
As of match played 4 April 2026

Appearances and goals by club, season and competition
Club	Season	League			National Cup		League Cup		Total	
Club	Season	Division	Apps	Goals	Apps	Goals	Apps	Goals	Apps	Goals
Brighton & Hove Albion	2018–19	Women's Super League	6	1	0	0	0	0	6	0
Brighton & Hove Albion	2019–20	Women's Super League	9	1	2	0	1	0	12	1
Brighton & Hove Albion	2020–21	Women's Super League	15	2	3	0	1	1	19	3
Brighton & Hove Albion	2021–22	Women's Super League	20	0	1	0	3	1	24	1
Brighton & Hove Albion	2022–23	Women's Super League	13	0	4	0	1	0	18	0
Brighton & Hove Albion	Total		63	4	10	0	6	2	79	5
Bristol City	2023–24	Women's Super League	22	1	1	0	2	0	25	1
Bristol City	Total		22	1	1	0	2	0	25	1
Lazio	2024–25	Serie A	21	1	1	0	0	0	22	1
Lazio	2025–26	Serie A	14	0	2	0	4	0	20	0
Lazio	Total		35	1	3	0	4	0	42	1
Career total			120	6	14	0	12	2	146	7

=== International ===
As of match played 13 October 2026

Appearances and goals by national team and year
National team	Year	Apps	Goals
Republic of Ireland	2016	7	1
Republic of Ireland	2017	7	0
Republic of Ireland	2018	3	0
Republic of Ireland	2019	6	0
Republic of Ireland	2020	2	0
Republic of Ireland	2021	8	2
Republic of Ireland	2022	5	1
Republic of Ireland	2023	13	0
Republic of Ireland	2024	8	0
Republic of Ireland	2025	6	0
Republic of Ireland	2026	8	0
Total		72	4

Scores and results list Republic of Ireland's goal tally first, score column indicates score after each Connolly goal.

List of international goals scored by Megan Connolly
No.	Date	Venue	Opponent	Score	Result	Competition	Ref.
1	7 June 2016	Tallaght Stadium, Dublin, Ireland	Montenegro	1–0	9–0	2017 UEFA Women's Championship Qual.	
2	26 October 2021	Helsinki Olympic Stadium, Helsinki, Finland	Finland	1–0	2–1	2023 FIFA Women's World Cup Qualification	
3	30 November 2021	Tallaght Stadium, Dublin, Ireland	Georgia	11–0	11–0	2023 FIFA Women's World Cup Qualification	
4	27 June 2022	Tengiz Burjanadze Stadium, Gori, Georgia	Georgia	3–0	9–0	2023 FIFA Women's World Cup Qualification	

== Honours ==
Cork GAA

- Munster U–16 Ladies Championship: 2012

College Corinthians

- Women's Munster Senior Cup: 2014–15

Florida State Seminoles

- NCAA Division I Women's Soccer Championship: 2018
- ACC women's soccer tournament: 2015, 2016, 2018

Individual

- FAI International Football Awards Under-19 Women's International Player of the Year: 2014, 2015
- 2015 ACC Freshman of the Year
- 2015 ACC Midfielder of the Year
- 2015 NSCAA First Team All-American
