= 2015 NCAA Division I women's soccer tournament =

2015 NCAA women's soccer tournament
Women's College Cup (semifinals & final)

Tournament details
- Country: United States
- Dates: November 13–December 6, 2015
- Teams: 64

Final positions
- Champions: Penn State (1st title)
- Runners-up: Duke
- Semifinalists: Florida State; Rutgers

Tournament statistics
- Matches played: 63
- Goals scored: 187 (2.97 per match)
- Top goal scorer(s): (United States) Morgan Andrews; USC (5 goals)
- All statistics correct as of 7/26/2015.

The 2015 NCAA Division I women's soccer tournament (also known as the 2015 Women's College Cup) was the 34th annual single-elimination tournament to determine the national champion of NCAA Division I women's collegiate soccer. The semi-finals and championship game were played at WakeMed Soccer Park in Cary, North Carolina from December 4–6, 2015 while the preceding rounds were played at various sites across the country during November 2015. The champion was Penn State, who defeated Duke 1–0 in the final.

== Qualification ==
All Division I women's soccer programs were eligible to qualify for the tournament. The tournament field remained fixed at 64 teams. 31 teams received automatic bids by winning their conference tournaments and an additional 33 teams earned at-large bids based on their regular season records.

=== Teams ===
Florida State Regional
Seed	School	Conference	Berth Type	Record
4	Auburn	SEC	At-large	16–6–1
2	Clemson	ACC	At-large	14–4–2
	Evansville	MVC	Automatic	07–11–2
1	Florida State	ACC	Automatic	14–2–4
	Furman	SoCon	Automatic	17–5–1
	Liberty	Big South	Automatic	12–7–1
	LSU	SEC	At-large	13–6–4
	Mississippi	SEC	At-large	14–5–4
	Murray State	OVC	Automatic	16–5
3	North Carolina	ACC	At-large	15–5–1
	North Texas	C-USA	Automatic	19–3–1
	South Alabama	Sun Belt	Automatic	18–3–2
	Southeastern Louisiana	Southland	Automatic	13–5–4
	Texas A&M	SEC	At-large	17–6–2
	Texas Tech	Big 12	Automatic	13–3–5
	Washington	Pac-12	At-large	12–7–2

Penn State Regional
Seed	School	Conference	Berth Type	Record
	Albany (NY)	America East	Automatic	11–8–1
	Boston University	Patriot	Automatic	13–6–3
	Butler	Big East	Automatic	16–6–1
3	California	Pac-12	At-large	13–6–3
	Cincinnati	AAC	Automatic	13–6–5
	Duquesne	Atlantic 10	Automatic	12–9–1
	Loyola Marymount	West Coast	At-large	15–6–1
	Minnesota	Big Ten	At-large	12–7–3
	Northwestern	Big Ten	At-large	14–6–2
	Ohio State	Big Ten	At-large	13–7–3
1	Penn State	Big Ten	Automatic	16–3–2
	South Dakota State	Summit	Automatic	12–6–3
	St. John's (NY)	Big East	At-large	15–4–1
4	Virginia Tech	ACC	At-large	15–3–3
	Washington State	Pac-12	At-large	14–6
2	West Virginia	Big 12	At-large	19–3–1

Stanford Regional
Seed	School	Conference	Berth Type	Record
	Arizona	Pac-12	At-large	14–6–2
	BYU	West Coast	Automatic	15–2–2
3	Duke	ACC	At-large	13–5–5
2	Florida	SEC	Automatic	17–3–1
	Florida Gulf Coast	Atlantic Sun	Automatic	14–6–2
	James Madison	CAA	Automatic	14–6–2
	Long Beach State	Big West	At-large	12–7–2
	Northern Colorado	Big Sky	Automatic	13–7–2
	San Jose State	Mountain West	Automatic	10–7–4
4	Santa Clara	West Coast	At-large	14–6–2
	South Florida	American	At-large	15–4–3
1	Stanford	Pac-12	Automatic	16–2–1
	UCF	American	At-large	12–6–1
	Utah Valley	WAC	Automatic	14–6–1
	Western Michigan	MAC	Automatic	14–4–4
	William & Mary	Colonial	At-large	14–5–3

Virginia Regional
Seed	School	Conference	Berth Type	Record
	Boston College	ACC	At-large	11–7–2
	Cal State Fullerton	Big West	Automatic	16–3–2
	Connecticut	American	At-large	19-3
	Fairleigh Dickinson	NEC	Automatic	16–6
	Georgetown	Big East	At-large	11–5–3
	Hofstra	Colonial	At-large	13–6–2
	Howard	SWAC	Automatic	13–8–2
3	Notre Dame	ACC	At-large	14–5–1
	Oakland	Horizon	Automatic	08–6–7
	Princeton	Ivy	Automatic	14–4–1
2	Rutgers	Big Ten	At-large	19–3–3
	Siena	MAAC	Automatic	12–7–3
	South Carolina	SEC	At-large	12–5–3
	UNC Wilmington	Colonial	At-large	15–7–1
4	USC	Pac-12	At-large	15–5–2
1	Virginia	ACC	At-large	19–1–3

== Florida State Bracket ==
First round November 13–15; Campus Sites
1	Florida State*	3
Evansville	0
LSU	0
South Alabama*	4
Texas Tech*	1
North Texas	0
Southeastern Louisiana	0
4	Auburn*	1
3	North Carolina*	3
Liberty	0
Texas A&M*	2
Washington	1
Ole Miss*	1
Murray State	0
Furman	0
2	Clemson*	3

Second round November 20–22; Regional Campus Sites
1	Florida State*	5
South Alabama	0
Texas Tech	2
4	Auburn	3
3	North Carolina	0
Texas A&M	1
Ole Miss (2OT PK)	1(5)
2	Clemson*	1(4)

Round of 16; November 20–22; Regional Campus Sites
1	Florida State*	2
4	Auburn	0
Texas A&M (2OT PK)	1(5)
Ole Miss	1(4)

Quarterfinals; November 27–28; Campus Sites
1	Florida State*	5
Texas A&M	0

==== Schedule ====
===== First round =====
November 13	(3) North Carolina	3–0	Liberty	Chapel Hill, NC
6:30 p.m. EST	Jessie Scarpa 47'; Megan Buckingham 62'; Alexa Newfield 84'	Report		Stadium: Fetzer Field; Attendance: 1,152; Referee: Matt Franz

November 13	(1) Florida State	3–0	Evansville	Tallahassee, FL
7:00 p.m. EST	Megan Connolly 31'; Berglind Björg Þorvaldsdóttir 43', 90'; Team (yellow card) 67'	Report		Stadium: Seminole Soccer Complex; Attendance: 1,240; Referee: Guido Gonzales

November 13	Texas Tech	1–0	North Texas	Lubbock, TX
7:00 p.m. CST	Janine Beckie 26'; Hannah Devine (yellow card) 68'	Report	(yellow card) 52' Lindsey Hulstein; (yellow card) 68' Tess Graham	Stadium: John Walker Soccer Complex; Attendance: 1,817; Referee: Tim Debysingh

November 14	(2) Clemson	3–0	Furman	Clemson, SC
7:05 p.m. EST	Shannon Horgan 12'; Miranda Weslake 12'; Abby Jones 66'	Report	(yellow card) 90' Sanon Williams	Stadium: Riggs Field; Attendance: 770; Referee: Lance Jacob Van Hait

== Stanford Bracket ==
First round November 13–15; Campus Sites
2	Florida*	1
Western Michigan	0
William & Mary	0(3)
UCF*	0(1)
South Florida*	1
Florida Gulf Coast	2
James Madison	0
3	Duke*	5
4	Santa Clara*	1
Long Beach State	0
Northern Colorado	0
Arizona*	2
BYU*	1
Utah Valley	0
San Jose State	0
1	Stanford	2

Second round November 20–22; Regional Campus Sites
2	Florida	5
William & Mary	2
Florida Gulf Coast	0
3	Duke	2
4	Santa Clara	1
Arizona	2
BYU	1
1	Stanford	2

Round of 16; November 20–22; Regional Campus Sites
2	Florida	1
3	Duke	2
Arizona	0
1	Stanford	3

Quarterfinals; November 27–28; Campus Sites
3	Duke (2OT PK)	1(3)
1	Stanford	1(1)

== Penn State Bracket ==
First round November 13–15; Campus Sites
1	Penn State*	5
Albany	0
Boston University	2
St. John's (NY)*	1
Ohio State*	2
Butler	1
Cincinnati	0
4	Virginia Tech*	4
3	California*	0
Loyola Marymount	1
South Dakota State	0
Minnesota*	5
Washington State*	0
Northwestern	1
Duquesne	0
2	West Virginia*	4

Second round November 20–22; Regional Campus Sites
1	Penn State	6
Boston University	0
Ohio State	1
4	Virginia Tech	0
Loyola Marymount	1
Minnesota	0
Northwestern	0
2	West Virginia	4

Round of 16; November 20–22; Regional Campus Sites
1	Penn State	4
Ohio State	0
Loyola Marymount	2
2	West Virginia	5

Quarterfinals; November 27–28; Campus Sites
1	Penn State	2
2	West Virginia	0

== Virginia Bracket ==
First round November 13–15; Campus Sites
2	Rutgers*	1
Fairleigh Dickinson	0
Hofstra (2OT, PK)	2(4)
Georgetown*	2(2)
Connecticut*	5
Siena	0
Oakland	0
3	Notre Dame*	5
4	USC* (2OT, PK)	3(4)
Cal State Fullerton	3(3)
Boston College	2
Princeton*	4
South Carolina*	0
UNC Wilmington	2
Howard	1
1	Virginia*	7

Second round November 20–22; Regional Campus Sites
2	Rutgers	2
Hofstra	0
Connecticut	2
3	Notre Dame	0
4	USC	3
Princeton	0
UNC Wilmington	0
1	Virginia	2

Round of 16; November 20–22; Regional Campus Sites
2	Rutgers	4
Connecticut	0
4	USC	0
1	Virginia	2

Quarterfinals; November 27–28; Campus Sites
2	Rutgers (2OT PK)	0(7)
1	Virginia	0(6)

== College Cup ==
Semifinals; December 4 WakeMed Soccer Park; Cary, North Carolina
1	Florida State	0
3	Duke	2
1	Penn State	2
2	Rutgers	0

Championship; December 6 WakeMed Soccer Park; Cary, North Carolina
3	Duke	0
1	Penn State	1

== Statistics ==
=== Goalscorers ===
There were 187 goals scored in 63 matches, for an average of 2.97 goals per match.

5 goals

- (United States) Morgan Andrews – USC

4 goals

- (United States) Emily Ogle – Penn State
- (United States) Makenzy Doniak – Virginia

3 goals

- (United States) Rachel Hill – Connecticut
- (Nigeria) Toni Payne – Duke
- (United States) Savannah Jordan – Florida
- (Republic of Ireland) Megan Connolly – Florida State
- (United States) Frannie Crouse – Penn State
- (United States) Megan Schafer – Penn State
- (Canada) Janine Beckie – Texas Tech
- (United States) Alexis Shaffer – Virginia
- (United States) Kailey Utley – West Virginia

2 goals

- (New Zealand) Hannah Wong – Arizona
- (Portugal) Stephanie Ribeiro – Connecticut
- (United States) Christina Gibbons – Duke
- (Jamaica) Kayla McCoy – Duke
- (United States) Taylor Racioppi – Duke
- (United States) Sarah Troccoli – Florida
- (United States) Michaela Hahn – Florida State
- (Iceland) Elín Metta Jensen – Florida State
- (Germany) Isabella Schmid – Florida State
- (Iceland) Berglind Björg Þorvaldsdóttir – Florida State
- (Jamaica) Cheyna Williams – Florida State
- (United States) Taylor Stainbrook – Minnesota
- (United States) Anna Maria Gilbertson – Notre Dame
- (United States) Haleigh Echard – Penn State
- (Costa Rica) Raquel Rodríguez – Penn State
- (United States) Charlotte Williams – Penn State
- (United States) Mimi Asom – Princeton
- (United States) Tyler Lussi – Princeton
- (United States) Danielle Henley – South Alabama
- (United States) Jordan DiBiasi – Stanford
- (United States) Ryan Walker-Hartshorn – Stanford
- (United States) Veronica Latsko – Virginia
- (United States) Alani Johnson – Virginia Tech
- (Cameroon) Michaela Abam – West Virginia

1 goal

- (United States) Jessica Nelson – Arizona
- (United States) Sheaffer Skadsen – Arizona
- (United States) Hannah Alspach – Auburn
- (United States) Logan Beal – Auburn
- (United States) Kristen Dodson – Auburn
- (United States) Taylor Troutman – Auburn
- (United States) Lauren Berman – Boston College
- (United States) McKenzie Meehan – Boston College
- (United States) Alexandra Cooper – Boston University
- (United States) Clare Pleuler – Boston University
- (United States) Sophia Maccagnone – Butler
- (United States) Elena Medeiros – BYU
- (United States) Bizzy Phillips Bowen – BYU
- (Mexico) Christina Burkenroad – Cal State Fullerton
- (United States) Jessica Simonian – Cal State Fullerton
- (United States) Rebecca Wilson – Cal State Fullerton
- (United States) Shannon Horgan – Clemson
- (United States) Abby Jones – Clemson
- (United States) Paige Reckert – Clemson
- (United States) Miranda Weslake – Clemson
- (Germany) Kim Urbanek – Connecticut
- (United States) Annie Wickett – Connecticut
- (United States) Malinda Allen – Duke
- (United States) Imani Dorsey – Duke
- (Canada) Quinn (Note: Then known as Rebecca Quinn) – Duke
- (Slovenia) Pamela Begič – Florida
- (United States) Meggie Dougherty Howard – Florida
- (United States) Shea Rhoney – Florida Gulf Coast
- (Venezuela) Paulina Speckmaier – Florida Gulf Coast
- (United States) Kaycie Tillman – Florida State
- (United States) Grace Damaska – Georgetown
- (United States) Melissa Downey – Georgetown
- (United States) Madeline Anderson – Hofstra
- (England) Leah Galton – Hofstra
- (United States) Whitney White – Howard
- (United States) Raquel Angelone – Loyola Marymount
- (United States) Sarah Sanger – Loyola Marymount
- (United States) Callie Taylor – Loyola Marymount
- (United States) Julianna Gernes – Minnesota
- (United States) Josee Stiever – Minnesota
- (United States) Megan Buckingham – North Carolina
- (United States) Alexa Newfield – North Carolina
- (United States) Jessie Scarpa – North Carolina
- (United States) Michelle Manning – Northwestern
- (Mexico) Sabrina Flores – Notre Dame
- (United States) Katie Naughton – Notre Dame
- (United States) Kaleigh Olmsted – Notre Dame
- (United States) Sammy Edwards – Ohio State
- (United States) Arden Holden – Ohio State
- (United States) Morgan Wolcott – Ohio State
- (United States) Liza Harbin – Ole Miss
- (United States) Gretchen Harknett – Ole Miss
- (United States) Olivia Harrison – Ole Miss
- (United States) Elizabeth Ball – Penn State
- (United States) Brittany Basinger – Penn State
- (Puerto Rico) Nickolette Driesse – Penn State
- (United States) Kaleigh Riehl – Penn State
- (United States) Colby Ciarrocca – Rutgers
- (United States) Rachel Cole – Rutgers
- (United States) Cassie Inacio – Rutgers
- (Dominican Republic) Brianne Reed – Rutgers
- (United States) Madison Tiernan – Rutgers
- (United States) Katelyn Walters – Rutgers
- (United States) Grace Cutler – Santa Clara
- (United States) Ashley Doyle – Santa Clara
- (United States) Charde Hannah – South Alabama
- (England) Rio Hardy – South Alabama
- (United States) Averie Collins – Stanford
- (United States) Megan Turner – Stanford
- (United States) Michelle Xiao – Stanford
- (United States) Jesse Schaefer – St. John's
- (United States) Kate Hajdu – Texas A&M
- (United States) Mikaela Harvey – Texas A&M
- (United States) Haley Pounds – Texas A&M
- (United States) Ally Watt – Texas A&M
- (Philippines) Katrina Guillou – UNC Wilmington
- (United States) Lauren Nalevaiko – UNC Wilmington
- (United States) Sydney Sladek – USC
- (United States) Ayan Adu – Virginia
- (United States) Meghan Cox – Virginia
- (United States) Candace Cephers – Virginia Tech
- (United States) Murielle Tiernan – Virginia Tech
- (United States) Pascale Dumesnil – Washington
- (United States) Hannah Abraham – West Virginia
- (United States) Leah Emaus – West Virginia
- (United States) Sh'Nia Gordon – West Virginia
- (United States) Amanda Hill – West Virginia
- (United States) Heather Kaleiohi – West Virginia
- (United States) Kelsie Maloney – West Virginia
- (Haiti) Amandine Pierre-Louis – West Virginia
- (Canada) Carla Portillo – West Virginia
- (United States) Leci Irvin – William & Mary
- (United States) Rachel Moore – William & Mary

1 own goal

- (United States) Courtney Schell – Auburn (playing against Florida State)
- Unknown – Florida Gulf Coast (playing against South Florida)
- (United States) Emily Agudelo – Hofstra (playing against Rutgers)
- Unknown – San Jose State (playing against Stanford)
- Unknown – South Dakota State (playing against Minnesota)
- (Cameroon) Easther Mayi Kith – West Virginia (playing against Loyola Marymount)

== See also ==
- NCAA Women's Soccer Championships (Division II, Division III)
- NCAA Men's Soccer Championships (Division I, Division II, Division III)
