= Alli Palisch =

Irish footballer (born 1994)

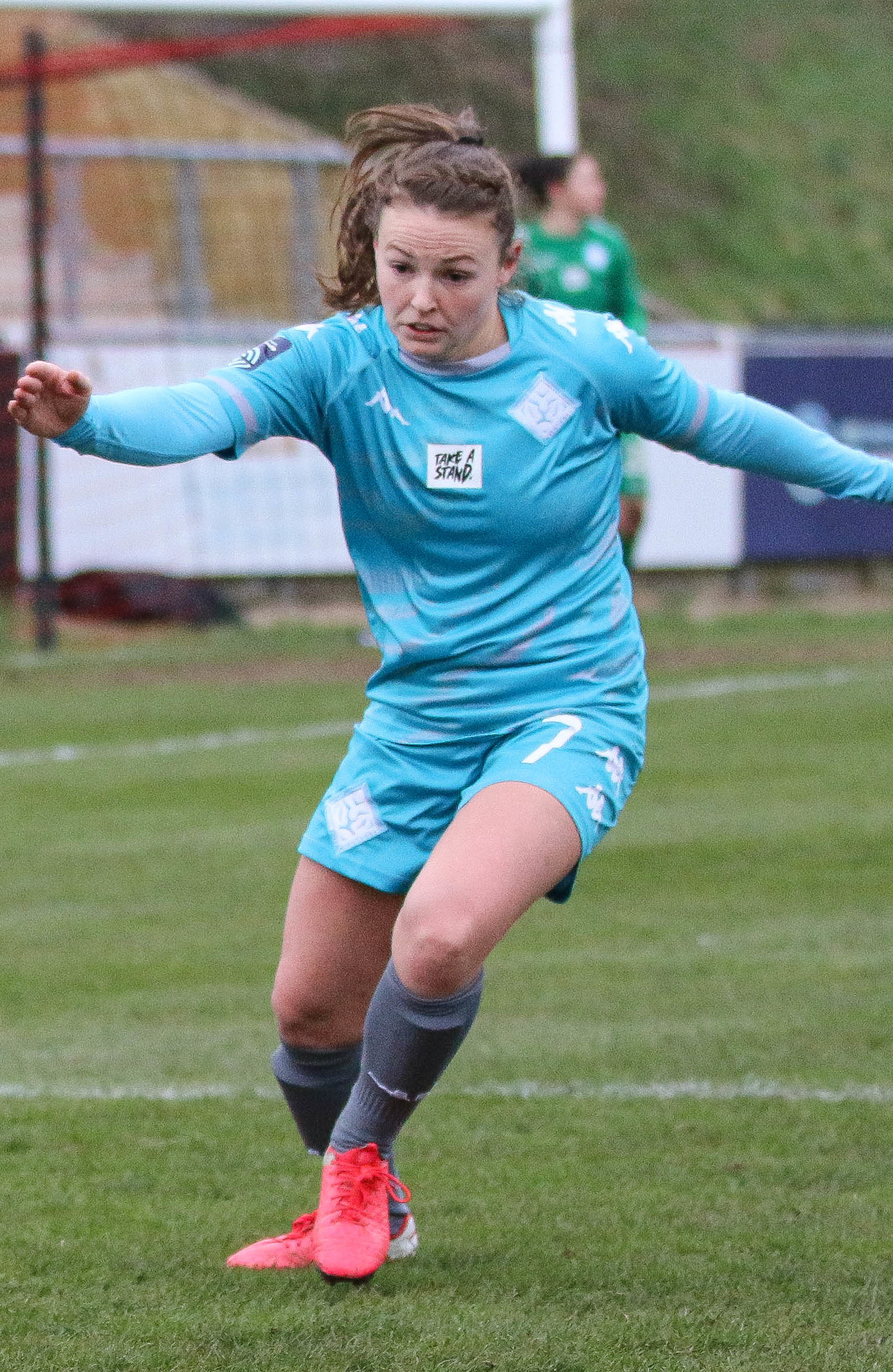
- Palisch with London City Lionesses in 2021

Personal information
- Full name: Allison Palisch
- Birth name: Allison Renee Murphy
- Date of birth: 13 May 1994 (age 32)
- Place of birth: Plano, Texas, U.S.
- Height: 5 ft 3 in (1.60 m)
- Position: Midfielder

Youth career
- 2004–2009: Texas Football Club
- 2009–2012: D'Feeters Soccer Club

College career
Years	Team	Apps	(Gls)
2012–2015	Texas Tech Red Raiders	67	(12)

Senior career*
Years	Team	Apps	(Gls)
2016	Washington Spirit	0	(0)
2017	Gustafs GoIF		
2018	Houston Dash	1	(0)
2018–2019	PEC Zwolle	18	(1)
2019	Selfoss	6	(2)
2020–2022	London City Lionesses	26	(2)
2022–2024	Watford	30	(1)

International career^{‡}
2021–	Republic of Ireland	1	(0)
- * Club domestic league appearances and goals as of 16:50, 18 August 2024 (UTC) ‡ National team caps and goals as of 21:25, 11 April 2021 (UTC)

Allison Murphy Palisch (born Allison Renee Murphy, 13 May 1994), formerly known as Alli Murphy, is a professional footballer who plays as a midfielder for English club Watford FC in the FA Women's National League South. Born and raised in the United States with an Irish father, she was capped for the Republic of Ireland women's national team.

== Club career ==
Murphy was a second-round pick (20th overall) for Washington Spirit in the 2016 NWSL College Draft. She spent the 2016 season on the Spirit reserve team.

In search of regular first-team football, Murphy moved to Swedish Division 1 Norra Svealand club Gustafs GoIF in 2017, then signed for Houston Dash for their 2018 season. Murphy attended the Dash's open tryouts and earned an invitation to the preseason training camp before making the regular-season roster.

In June 2018, Dash waived Murphy along with Claire Falknor to make room on the roster for Sofia Huerta and Taylor Comeau, who were acquired in a trade with Chicago Red Stars. Dash coach Vera Pauw, who said Murphy needed to work the technical side of her game, arranged for her to join PEC Zwolle in the Netherlands. Murphy played in 18 matches with PEC Zwolle, 15 as a starter, during the 2018–19 season. In August 2019, she joined Selfoss in Iceland.

In July 2020, Murphy joined London City Lionesses of the English FA Women's Championship.

In August 2022, Murphy joined Watford F.C. Women of the English FA Women's Championship.

== International career ==
In January 2016 Murphy trained with the touring Republic of Ireland national team, who were in California to play two matches against the United States. Her college coach Tom Stone had alerted the Football Association of Ireland that Murphy was eligible as she had grandparents from Limerick and held an Irish passport.

Senior Republic of Ireland national team coach Vera Pauw called up Murphy for the first time on 28 August 2020, for the UEFA Women's Euro 2022 qualifier against Germany on 19 September 2020. Pauw was Murphy's coach at Houston Dash, although Pauw said she was unaware of Murphy's Irish passport until she was alerted by Lionesses coach Lisa Fallon. Murphy made her international debut on 11 April 2021, starting Ireland's 1–0 friendly defeat by Belgium at King Baudouin Stadium in Brussels.

== Personal life ==
She married Austin Palisch in January 2021.
