= Janine Sonis =

Canadian soccer player (born 1994)

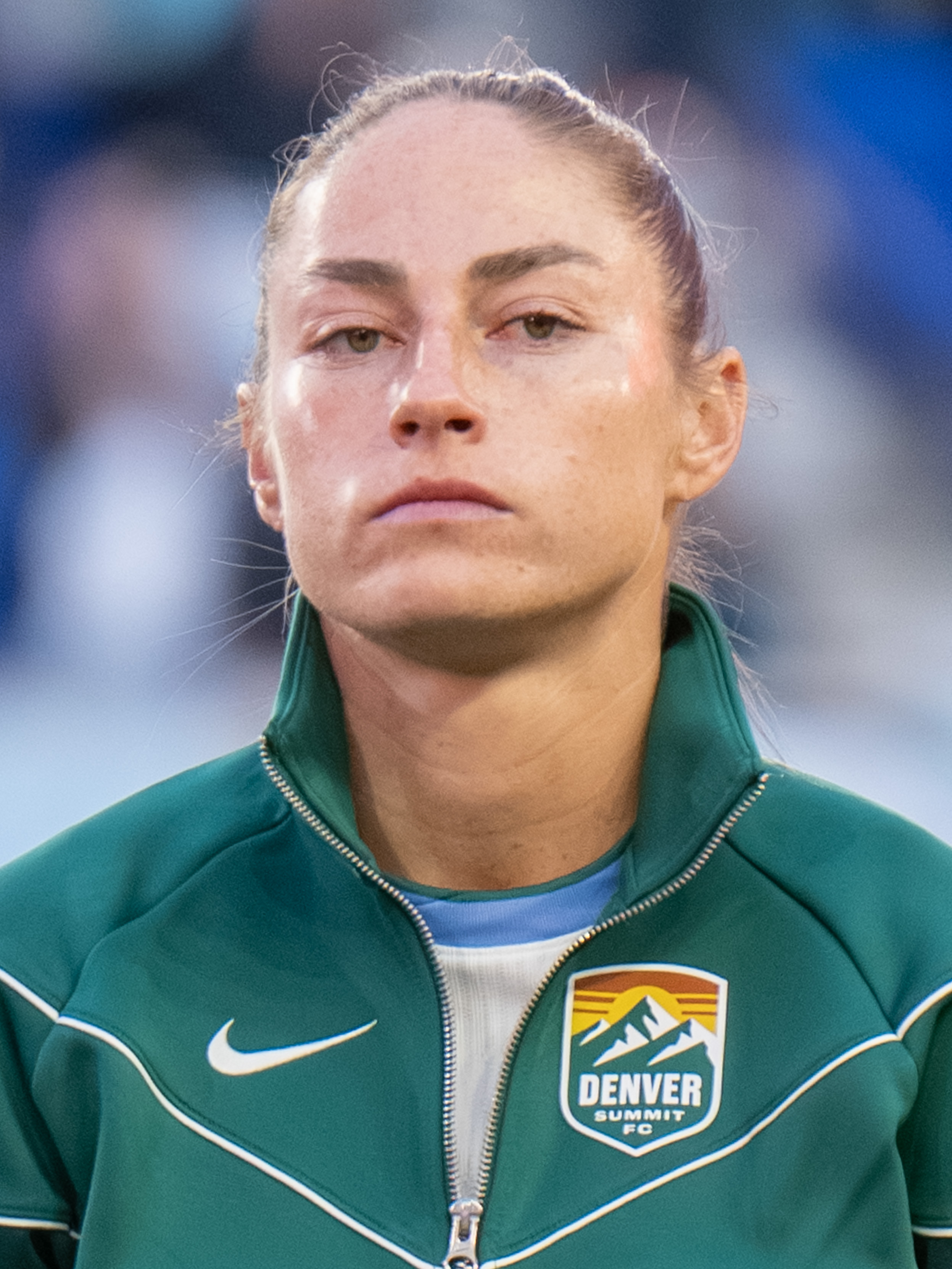
- Sonis with the Denver Summit in 2026

Personal information
- Full name: Janine Elizabeth Sonis
- Birth name: Janine Elizabeth Beckie
- Date of birth: August 20, 1994 (age 32)
- Place of birth: Highlands Ranch, Colorado, United States
- Height: 5 ft 8 in (1.73 m)
- Positions: Forward; full-back

Team information
- Current team: Denver Summit FC
- Number: 6

Youth career
- Real Colorado

College career
Years	Team	Apps	(Gls)
2012–2015	Texas Tech Red Raiders	88	(57)

Senior career*
Years	Team	Apps	(Gls)
2016–2017	Houston Dash	38	(5)
2018	Sky Blue FC	15	(0)
2018–2022	Manchester City	49	(6)
2022–2024	Portland Thorns	35	(3)
2024–2025	Racing Louisville	36	(4)
2026–	Denver Summit	29	(12)

International career^{‡}
2011–2012	United States U18		
2013	United States U20		
2014	Canada U20	4	(2)
2015	Canada U23	5	(2)
2014–	Canada	132	(40)
Medal record
Women's football
Representing Canada
CONCACAF W Championship
Runner-up	2018 United States
Runner-up	2022 Mexico
Olympic Games
Gold medal – first place	2020 Tokyo	Team
Bronze medal – third place	2016 Rio de Janeiro	Team
- * Club domestic league appearances and goals as of 06:41, November 8, 2026 (UTC) ‡ National team caps and goals as of October 12, 2026

Janine Elizabeth Sonis (née Beckie; born August 20, 1994) is a professional soccer player who plays as a forward or full-back for Denver Summit FC of the National Women's Soccer League (NWSL). Born in the United States to Canadian parents, she represents the Canada national team, for whom she has made more than 130 appearances.

Sonis played college soccer for the Texas Tech Red Raiders, finishing as the program's all-time leader in goals, points and game-winning goals and earning first-team All-American honours in 2014. She was drafted eighth overall by the Houston Dash in the 2016 NWSL College Draft. Two years later she was traded to Sky Blue FC before joining English club Manchester City, where she won two Women's FA Cups and two Women's League Cups across four seasons and was converted from a winger into a full-back. In 2022 she returned to the NWSL with the Portland Thorns and won the 2022 NWSL Championship; a torn anterior cruciate ligament then cost her the whole of 2023. After two seasons with Racing Louisville she joined the expansion side Denver Summit in 2026, returning to the state where she grew up.

Twenty seconds into Canada's opening match of the 2016 Olympic tournament, Sonis scored what remains the fastest goal in the history of Olympic football. She finished as Canada's leading scorer at those Games as the team took bronze, and was a member of the squad that won gold at Tokyo 2020. She also represented Canada at the 2019 FIFA Women's World Cup and the 2024 Olympics. Away from the field she has served as executive director of the Canadian Soccer Players Association and was among the players who testified before a Canadian parliamentary committee during the national team's 2023 labour dispute with Canada Soccer.

== Early life ==
Sonis was born on August 20, 1994 in Colorado to Canadian parents. Her mother and father were born in Saskatchewan and moved to Colorado for her father's work shortly before she was born; her three older siblings were born in Canada, and she holds dual Canadian and American citizenship. Her father, Gary, died of melanoma in 2001 at the age of 41; she has said that wearing his surname on a Canada jersey was a way of honouring him.

Sonis has described her family as an athletic one—"athletics was in our blood"—and competed in snowboarding, track, basketball, baseball, softball, lacrosse and gymnastics, continuing to play basketball into her college years. She began playing soccer at the age of four and has recalled an early instinct for finishing: "I was the kid that waited outside of the group, went and got the ball and scored ... which is funny because all three of my siblings were defenders." Her brother Drew, who went on to a decade-long professional career, was an early influence; the two spent childhood days playing in the backyard, and in adulthood their relationship became a collaborative exchange of analysis about each other's matches. Soccer became her focus only once she judged it the clearest route to a professional career: "It was like, what sport do I think that I could really make a living in?"

She played youth soccer for Real Colorado, based in Centennial, and attended Valor Christian High School in Highlands Ranch, Colorado. She was a varsity starter for four years at Valor Christian and was named Gatorade's Colorado girls' soccer player of the year in 2012.

== College career ==
Sonis attended Texas Tech University and played for the Red Raiders from 2012 to 2015, appearing in 88 matches and scoring 57 goals with 16 assists for 130 points. She scored in double figures in each of her four seasons—14 as a freshman, 12 as a sophomore, 17 as a junior and 14 as a senior—and left as the program's all-time leader in goals, points and game-winning goals, with 22.

She was named Big 12 Conference rookie of the year in 2012 and twice took the conference's offensive player of the year award. She remains the only Texas Tech player named to the All-Big 12 first team in all four of her seasons, and was an All-American in 2012 and 2014. Texas Tech reached the NCAA tournament in each of her four years, advancing to the second round every season and to the round of 16 in 2014. As a senior she was a semifinalist for the MAC Hermann Trophy, was named the most outstanding offensive player of the 2015 Big 12 tournament, which Texas Tech won, and was named player of the year by Dallas Soccer News. She was inducted into the Texas Tech Athletics Hall of Fame in November 2025. She enrolled as a journalism major before broadening her studies, graduating with a degree in media strategies.

== Club career ==
=== Early career ===
In 2013, Sonis signed with the Seattle Sounders Women in the USL W-League.

=== Houston Dash ===
Sonis was selected eighth overall in the 2016 NWSL College Draft by the Houston Dash. On February 8, 2016 it was announced that she would be allocated to the team as part of the NWSL Player Allocation. She scored on her professional debut against the Chicago Red Stars on April 16, 2016, and finished a rookie season interrupted by the Olympics with three goals and two assists from 14 appearances, 11 of them starts. She played a fuller part in 2017, making 24 league appearances and scoring twice.

=== Sky Blue FC ===
On January 18, 2018 Sonis was moved to Sky Blue FC alongside Carli Lloyd in a three-club deal involving the Dash, the Chicago Red Stars and Sky Blue, which also sent Sam Kerr to Chicago and Christen Press to Houston. She made 15 appearances without scoring for a Sky Blue side that did not win a match all season, and announced her departure on 9 August 2018.

=== Manchester City ===
Sonis's transfer to Manchester City was confirmed on August 9, 2018, manager Nick Cushing calling her "an excellent addition to our squad." She concluded her first season with eight goals and two trophies, the League Cup and the FA Cup. In the 2019–20 season she made her first start in the UEFA Women's Champions League and scored a hat-trick in the competition. She shared the lead in assists in the 2019–20 Women's Super League season, and signed a contract extension on April 14, 2020 running to 2022.

Having arrived as a winger, Sonis was gradually asked to play at full-back, an adjustment she described as demanding: "It's asked a lot of me from a technical perspective ... I really had to go into the position with an open mind." She has said the hardest part of the move to England was the relocation rather than the football: "My biggest challenge was just moving to another country and to another league ... having to acclimatize to a new environment, a new culture. And then on top of that, being expected to perform there."

Sonis was an unused member of the squad for the 2019 FA Cup final, but came on in the 119th minute of the 2020 final against Everton at Wembley Stadium on November 1, 2020 and scored in a 3–1 extra-time win. She left City in April 2022 having made 90 appearances in all competitions, scoring 23 goals and winning four trophies. She later described the four years as a highlight of her career, citing "being really engulfed in the footballing culture and being a champion many times over there."

=== Portland Thorns ===
Sonis with the Portland Thorns in April 2024, during her first season back from a knee injury

On April 1, 2022 Sonis returned to the NWSL on a three-year contract with Portland Thorns FC, who sent $75,000 in allocation money to Racing Louisville FC, the club holding her league rights. She had intended to remain in Europe longer, but said the move offered a combination she could not refuse: proximity to home, a long-held ambition to return to the NWSL, and the presence of general manager Karina LeBlanc and club captain Christine Sinclair, both former Canada internationals. "It's been great to be underneath people that I have such good relationships with," she said, "and it's been great to be on the field with Sinc at a club level." She made 19 league appearances in her first season as Portland won the 2022 NWSL Championship.

In March 2023 she tore the anterior cruciate ligament in her right knee in a pre-season match against the United States under-23 team, ruling her out of the entire 2023 season and the 2023 FIFA Women's World Cup. Writing on social media at the time, she said "heartbroken is an understatement." Reflecting on the lay-off later that year, she called it "a massive blessing in disguise ... it's shown me so many parts of me that need to get stronger, you know, mentally, physically, emotionally." She returned for the Thorns' 2024 season opener, scoring twice in a 5–4 away defeat to the Kansas City Current.

=== Racing Louisville ===
Sonis with Racing Louisville in October 2025

On August 21, 2024 Portland traded Sonis to Racing Louisville FC in exchange for Reilyn Turner, and she signed a two-year contract extension with Racing. Coming three weeks after the Olympics, the move was, she said, "obviously a shock," though she gave the clubs "the green light to get this over the line" and left Portland without animosity. Her first goal for Louisville, on September 14, 2024, won a 2–1 match against Angel City FC.

As the club's vice-captain in 2025 she featured in all 26 of Racing's league matches, starting 23, scoring three goals and leading the team with five assists. She was named to the NWSL Best XI for October and November, and reached 100 NWSL appearances during the season.

=== Denver Summit ===
On January 9, 2026 Sonis was traded to the NWSL expansion team Denver Summit FC for up to US$160,000 in intraleague transfer funds, signing a contract through the 2028 season and returning to her home state. The move reunited her with Cushing, who had become Denver's head coach; he cited her ties to the city, saying "she is from Denver, so there is a huge emotional connection." Sonis called the trade "the best Christmas present I could ask for" and said she was eager to join Denver because "I knew I could help build the club's culture."

She captained Denver in the club's inaugural league match on March 14, 2026, a 2–1 defeat to Bay FC in which she assisted the franchise's first NWSL goal, scored by Melissa Kössler, before being sent off in the 25th minute. She held the captaincy until the arrival of Lindsey Heaps in June, when she reverted to vice-captain.

Deployed primarily as a defender, Sonis nonetheless became Denver's leading scorer. After eight matches without a goal she scored braces in consecutive games in May, the second in a 3–1 win over the Orlando Pride that gave the club its first home victory and earned her NWSL player of the week. She was subsequently named to the NWSL Best XI for May, the second such honour of her career. As of 22 September 2026 she had scored 11 goals with five assists in 24 appearances.

== International career ==
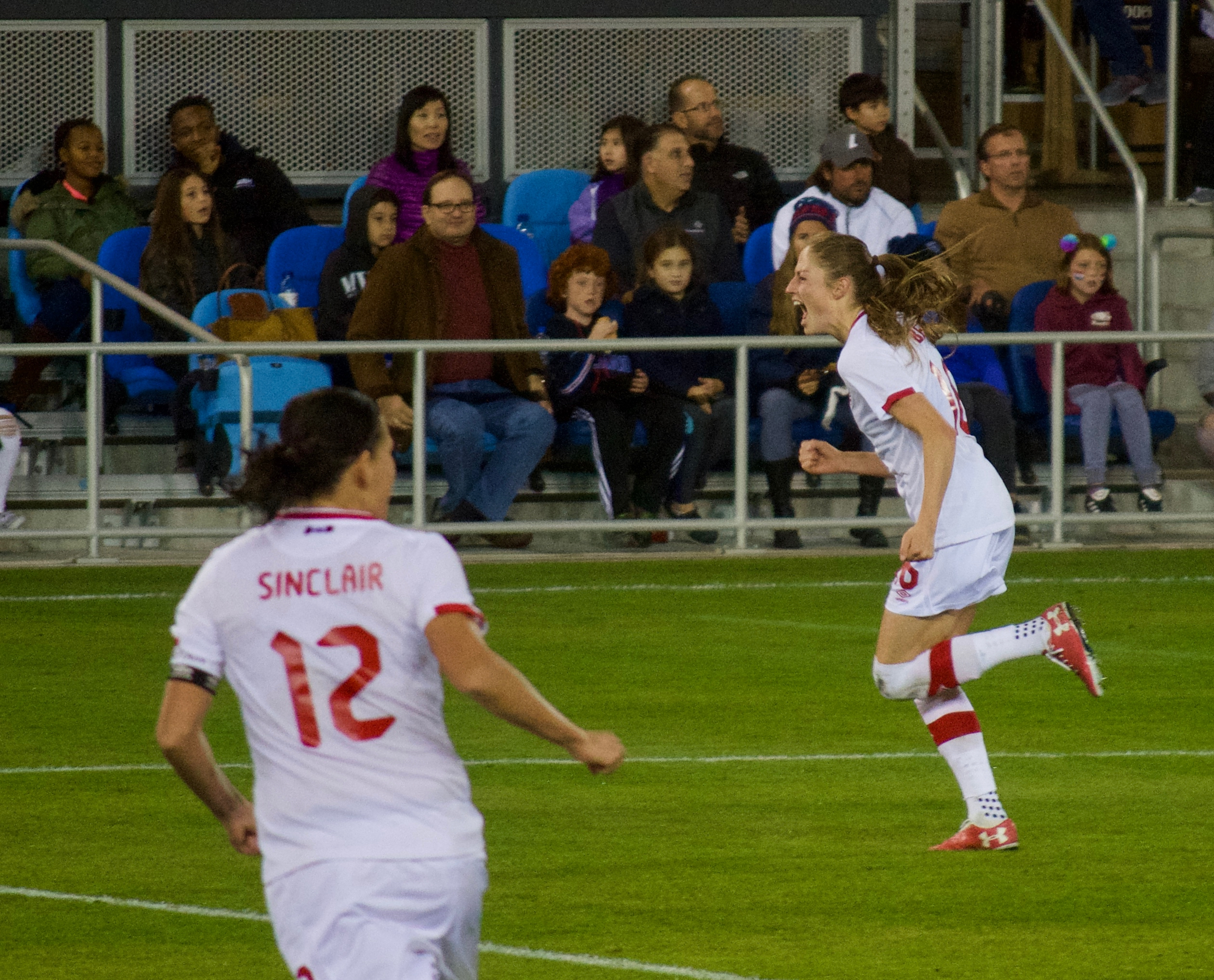
Sonis celebrates after scoring in a friendly

Sonis represented the United States at under-18 and under-20 level before accepting an invitation to play for Canada, the country of her parents' birth. Of a decision complicated by dual eligibility and by friendships within the American setup, she said: "My life is just a confusing life. It's a long story on where I come from and why I play for who I do."

In August 2014 she scored the winning goal against North Korea to send Canada's under-20 side into the knockout stage of the 2014 FIFA U-20 Women's World Cup. She made her senior debut on November 26, 2014, replacing Brittany Baxter at half-time in a 1–1 draw with Sweden in Long Beach, California, days after scoring in Texas Tech's NCAA tournament campaign. She scored twice against Ecuador in Canada's opening match of the 2015 Pan American Games, where the team finished fourth.

In the final of the 2016 Algarve Cup she scored the 67th-minute winner against Brazil in a 2–1 victory, securing Canada's first title at the tournament.

=== 2016 Summer Olympics ===
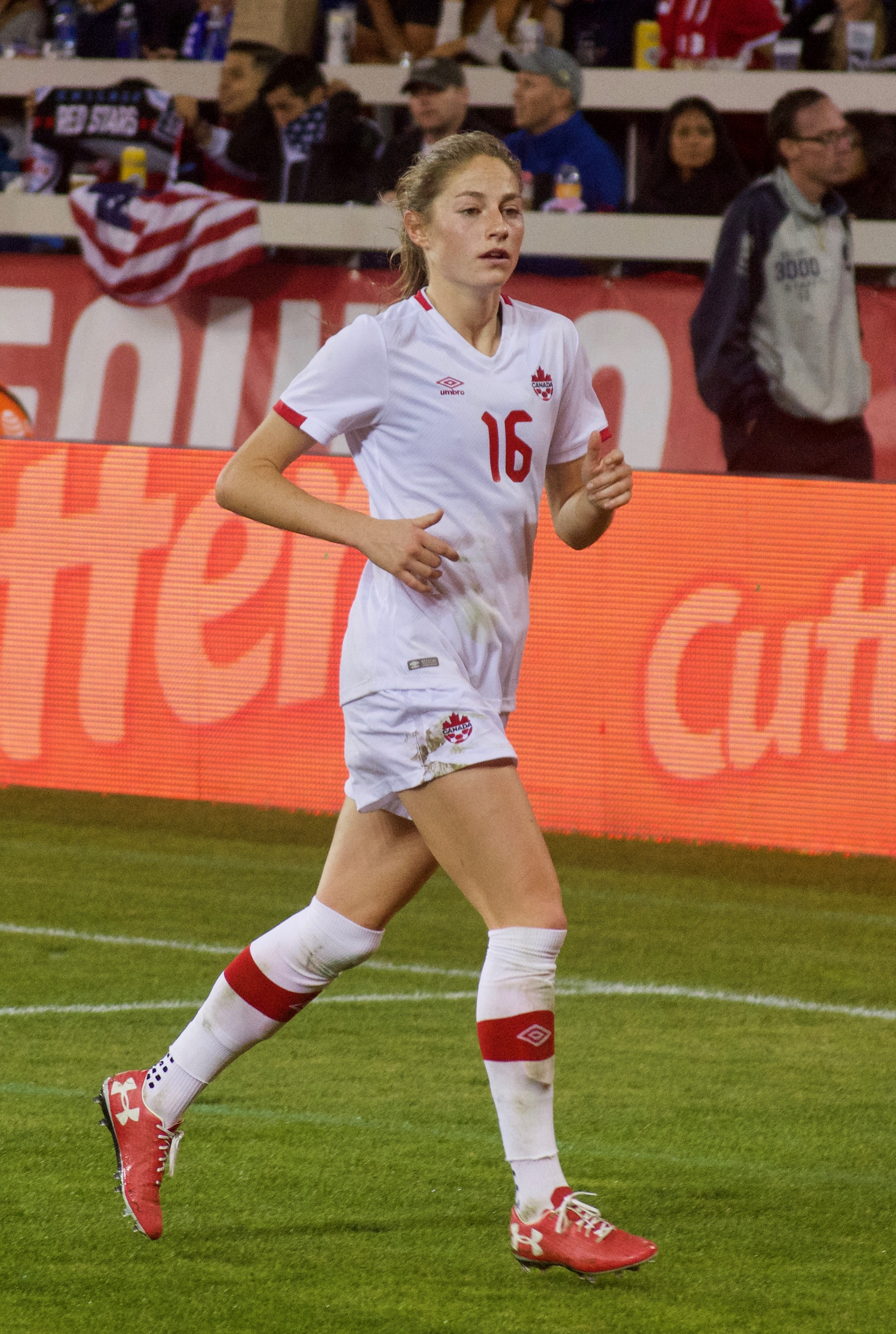
Sonis with Canada in November 2017

Twenty seconds into Canada's opening match of the 2016 Olympic tournament, against Australia at the Arena Corinthians on August 3, 2016, Sonis scored the fastest goal in the history of Olympic football, men's or women's. Canada won 2–0.

She scored twice more three days later, in the seventh and 35th minutes of a 3–1 win over Zimbabwe, to finish as Canada's leading scorer at the Games. Canada beat hosts Brazil 2–1 in the bronze-medal match on August 19, retaining the medal won in 2012 and becoming the first Canadian team in a summer team sport to take medals at consecutive Olympic Games since the lacrosse teams of 1904 and 1908. Twenty seconds into Canada's opening match of the 2016 Olympic tournament, against Australia at the Arena Corinthians on August 3, 2016, Sonis scored the fastest goal in the history of Olympic football, men's or women's. Canada won 2–0.

She scored twice more three days later, in the seventh and 35th minutes of a 3–1 win over Zimbabwe, to finish as Canada's leading scorer at the Games. Canada beat hosts Brazil 2–1 in the bronze-medal match on 19 August, retaining the medal won in 2012 and becoming the first Canadian team in a summer team sport to take medals at consecutive Olympic Games since the lacrosse teams of 1904 and 1908.

=== 2019 FIFA Women's World Cup ===
Sonis was named on May 25, 2019 to Canada's squad for the 2019 FIFA Women's World Cup. She started on the left as Canada beat New Zealand 2–0 at the Stade des Alpes on June 15, to secure passage from the group; the team lost to Sweden in the round of 16.

=== 2020 Summer Olympics ===
On July 24, 2021 Sonis scored both goals in a 2–1 win over Chile in Sapporo, Canada's first victory of the 2020 Summer Olympics. She converted a rebound in the 39th minute after Christiane Endler parried her shot, then rounded the goalkeeper three minutes later following a pass from Nichelle Prince.

On August 6, 2021 Canada defeated Sweden 3–2 on penalties to take the gold medal, the country's first Summer Olympic title in a team sport since 1908.

=== 2022 CONCACAF W Championship ===
Sonis was called up for the 2022 CONCACAF W Championship and, going into the tournament, was named Canada Soccer's player of the month for June 2022. She scored and made two assists in Canada's opening match. She started the final on July 18, 2022, a 1–0 defeat to the United States that left Canada with the silver medal.

=== Labour dispute and injury ===
Sonis made her 100th international appearance on February 19, 2023, a 2–0 win over Brazil at the 2023 SheBelieves Cup, a tournament Canada contested under protest. The players had withdrawn their labour days before the tournament after learning that the programme's budget was to be cut in a World Cup year. Sonis, one of the squad's player representatives, said the job action was "the only way to get the attention of the [Canadian Soccer Association] and portray how serious we were", and that the cuts were "falling on the players and hurting our preparation".

She characterised the players' demands as extending well beyond pay: "Equal resource, equal opportunity funding for our youth program, and on the very end of that is a compensation agreement that is the same as our men's team. I think the common misconception is that the compensation is all we're worried about." The team returned to training and competition after Canada Soccer threatened legal action, and trained in inside-out kit to conceal the federation crest. Sonis said at the time: "We will continue to demand more. Lasting change is a fight we're in for the long haul." She later described herself as "cautiously optimistic", noting that while she and three other player representatives had been the public face of the dispute, "there are 25 players behind us that are also putting their names on the line".

Weeks after the SheBelieves Cup she sustained the knee injury that ended her season and cost her the World Cup; she returned to the national-team squad in December 2023.

=== 2024 Summer Olympics ===
Sonis was named to Canada's squad for the 2024 Summer Olympics. The title defence was overshadowed by the Canada Soccer drone spying scandal, which led to the suspension of head coach Bev Priestman and a six-point deduction that obliged Canada to win all three group matches to advance, which they did. Sonis came on at half-time of the quarter-final against Germany for the injured Jessie Fleming and converted her attempt in the shootout, but Germany won 4–2 on penalties after a goalless draw, ending Canada's run of Olympic medals in the sport. She later said the episode "feels like a fever dream," adding that "the players were completely unaware that any of this was going on" and that she "would never in a million years condone the actions that were taken."

=== 2025 Pinatar Cup ===
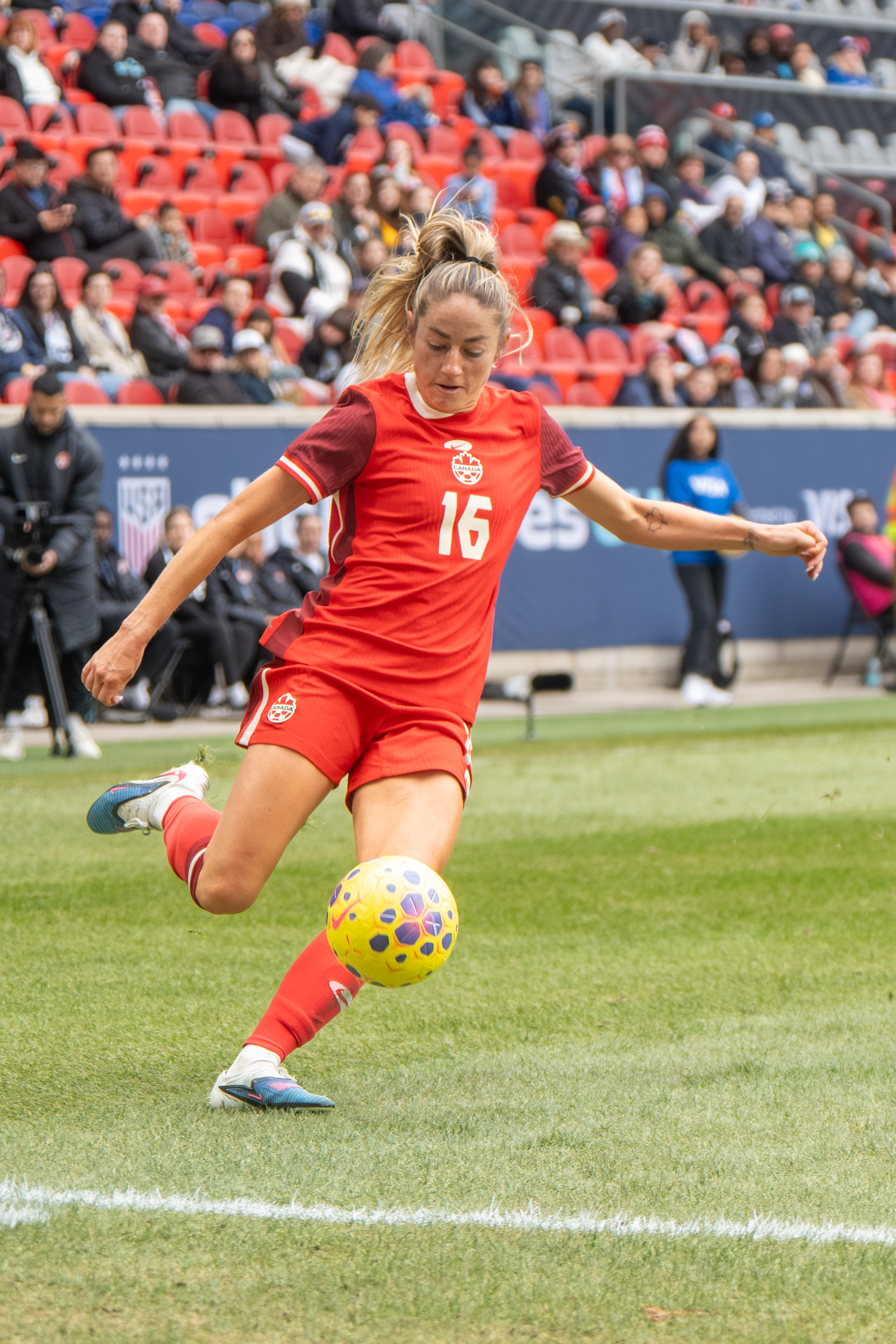
Sonis with Canada in 2026

Sonis was part of the squad that won the 2025 Pinatar Cup in February 2025, the first tournament under new head coach Casey Stoney.

=== 2026 SheBelieves Cup ===
Selected as a defender for the 2026 SheBelieves Cup, Sonis scored from a free kick in Canada's opening game, a 4–1 win over Colombia on March 1, 2026, and drew praise for her defensive work. Canada finished second after a 1–0 loss to the United States and a goalless draw with Argentina won on penalties, Sonis scoring in the shootout.

== Style of play ==
Sonis began her career as a forward and winger, and for Canada was among the most direct attackers of her generation, with a habit of scoring early and from rebounds inside the six-yard box. Her most consequential technical change came at Manchester City, where Cushing moved her from the wing to full-back; she described the switch as asking "a lot of me from a technical perspective," and Cushing identified her willingness to attempt it as her defining quality: "The best of Janine is: she is willing to do it."

The conversion proved lasting. Canada Soccer, Racing Louisville and Denver Summit have variously listed her as a defender, winger and forward since 2024, and in 2026 she led Denver in scoring from a defensive position while ranking among the club's leaders in tackles. She is also an established creator, leading Racing Louisville in assists in 2025 and sharing the Women's Super League assist lead in 2019–20.

Sonis has described her national-team role as shifting over time from goalscorer to senior professional, offering "solid consistency, and a pillar kind of attitude in the team". Asked in 2023 about the Canada captaincy, she said: "I would be so honoured one day to wear the captain's armband if that happens. If it doesn't, it's not meant for me. We have so many people to put that armband on that fully, fully deserve it." She went on to captain Denver Summit through the opening months of the club's first season.

== Outside football ==
Sonis has served as executive director of the Canadian Soccer Players Association. On 9 March 2023 she appeared before the House of Commons Standing Committee on Canadian Heritage alongside Christine Sinclair, Quinn and Sophie Schmidt to criticise Canada Soccer's treatment of the women's programme, telling the committee that the federation's commercial arrangements had left the players "negotiating in the dark". She later described her dealings with incoming Canada Soccer chief executive Kevin Blue as constructive. Teammates at Denver nicknamed her "Madam President" in reference to the role.

Sonis has also worked in sports media alongside her playing career, drawing on her media strategies degree. She served as a studio analyst for TSN during the 2022 FIFA World Cup in Qatar, a role she found complicated by her closeness to the subject: "It's really quite difficult to try and be non-biased when you're talking about the Canadian team." During the COVID-19 pandemic she launched Brewing with Beckie, a video podcast combining coffee and football in which she interviewed players and other figures in the game.

In January 2022 she joined the ownership group of League1 Ontario club Simcoe County Rovers FC, framing the investment as a step toward a professional women's league in Canada: "You don't go from zero to 100 ... this is one of those stepping stones." Her interest in coffee later became a business: she has launched a brand, 90Brew, with plans for a shop in Denver.

== Personal life ==
Sonis is a Christian, and has described her faith as "1000% my foundation", the frame through which she approaches difficult decisions. Her brother Drew Beckie was also a professional soccer player and serves as an assistant coach at Atlético Ottawa.

She announced her engagement to Ethan Sonis in September 2023. The couple married in December 2024, after which she took his surname, having played as Janine Beckie for the first decade of her career.

== Career statistics ==
=== Club ===
As of September 22, 2026

Club	League	Season	League		Playoffs		Cup		League Cup		Continental		Total	
Club	League	Season	Apps	Goals	Apps	Goals	Apps	Goals	Apps	Goals	Apps	Goals	Apps	Goals
Houston Dash	NWSL	2016	14	3	0	0	—		—		—		14	3
Houston Dash	NWSL	2017	24	2	0	0	—		—		—		24	2
Houston Dash	Total		38	5	0	0	—		—		—		38	5
Sky Blue FC	NWSL	2018	15	0	0	0	—		—		—		15	0
Manchester City	FA WSL	2018–19	10	1	—		6	7	0	0	0	0	16	8
Manchester City	FA WSL	2019–20	14	0	—		5	0	0	0	4	5	23	5
Manchester City	FA WSL	2020–21	14	4	—		3	2	4	0	4	1	25	7
Manchester City	FA WSL	2021–22	11	1	—		2	0	5	1	2	0	20	2
Manchester City	Total		49	6	—		16	9	9	1	10	6	84	22
Portland Thorns FC	NWSL	2022	19	0	2	0	1	0	0	0	0	0	22	0
Portland Thorns FC	NWSL	2023	0	0	0	0	0	0	0	0	0	0	0	0
Portland Thorns FC	NWSL	2024	16	3	0	0	0	0	0	0	0	0	16	3
Portland Thorns FC	Total		35	3	2	0	1	0	0	0	0	0	38	3
Racing Louisville	NWSL	2024	10	1	0	0	0	0	0	0	0	0	10	1
Racing Louisville	NWSL	2025	26	3	0	0	0	0	0	0	0	0	26	3
Racing Louisville	Total		36	4	0	0	0	0	0	0	0	0	36	4
Denver Summit FC	NWSL	2026	24	11	0	0	0	0	0	0	0	0	24	11
Career total			197	29	2	0	17	9	9	1	10	6	235	45

=== International goals ===
Key (expand for notes on "international goals" and sorting)
Location	Geographic location of the venue where the competition occurred Sorted by country name first, then by city name
Lineup	Start – played entire match on minute (off player) – substituted on at the minute indicated, and player was substituted off at the same time off minute (on player) – substituted off at the minute indicated, and player was substituted on at the same time (c) – captain Sorted by minutes played
#	NumberOfGoals.goalNumber scored by the player in the match (alternate notation to Goal in match)
Min	The minute in the match the goal was scored. For list that include caps, blank indicates played in the match but did not score a goal.
Assist/pass	The ball was passed by the player, which assisted in scoring the goal. This column depends on the availability and source of this information.
penalty or pk	Goal scored on penalty-kick which was awarded due to foul by opponent. (Goals scored in penalty-shoot-out, at the end of a tied match after extra-time, are not included.)
Score	The match score after the goal was scored. Sorted by goal difference, then by goal scored by the player's team
Result	The final score. Sorted by goal difference in the match, then by goal difference in penalty-shoot-out if it is taken, followed by goal scored by the player's team in the match, then by goal scored in the penalty-shoot-out. For matches with identical final scores, match ending in extra-time without penalty-shoot-out is a tougher match, therefore precede matches that ended in regulation
aet	The score at the end of extra-time; the match was tied at the end of 90' regulation
pso	Penalty-shoot-out score shown in parentheses; the match was tied at the end of extra-time
	Green background color – exhibition or closed door international friendly match
	Yellow background color – match at an invitational tournament
	Red background color – Olympic women's football qualification match
	Light-blue background color – FIFA women's world cup qualification match
	Pink background color – Olympic women's football tournament
	Blue background color – FIFA women's world cup final tournament
NOTE: some keys may not apply for a particular football player

Goal	Date	Location	Opponent	Score	Result	Competition
1.	January 15, 2015	Shenzhen Stadium	Mexico	1–1	2–1	2015 Four Nations Tournament
2.	December 13, 2015	Arena das Dunas, Natal	Trinidad and Tobago	2–0	4–0	2015 International Tournament of Natal
3.	December 20, 2015	Arena das Dunas, Natal	Brazil	1–1	1–3	2015 International Tournament of Natal
4.	February 14, 2016	BBVA Compass Stadium	Trinidad and Tobago	5–0	6–0	2016 CONCACAF Women's Olympic Qualifier
5.	February 16, 2016	BBVA Compass Stadium	Guatemala	3–0	10–0	2016 CONCACAF Women's Olympic Qualifier
6.	March 7, 2016	Lagos Municipal Stadium, Lagos, Portugal	Iceland	1–0	1–0	2016 Algarve Cup
7.	March 9, 2016	Lagos Municipal Stadium, Lagos, Portugal	Brazil	2–0	2–1	2016 Algarve Cup
8.	April 10, 2016	Jan Louwers Stadion, Eindhoven	Netherlands	2–0	2–1	Friendly
9.	June 7, 2016	TD Place, Ottawa	Brazil	1–0	1–0	Friendly
10.	August 3, 2016	Arena Corinthians, São Paulo	Australia	1–0	2–0	2016 Summer Olympics
11.	August 6, 2016	Arena Corinthians, São Paulo	Zimbabwe	1–0	3–1	2016 Summer Olympics
12.	August 6, 2016	Arena Corinthians, São Paulo	Zimbabwe	3–0	3–1	2016 Summer Olympics
13.	February 4, 2017	BC Place, Vancouver	Mexico	2–1	3–2	Friendly
14.	February 4, 2017	BC Place, Vancouver	Mexico	3–1	3–2	Friendly
15.	April 6, 2017	Vångavallen, Trelleborg	Sweden	1–0	1–0	Friendly
16.	June 11, 2017	BMO Field, Toronto	Costa Rica	2–0	6–0	Friendly
17.	June 11, 2017	BMO Field, Toronto	Costa Rica	3–0	6–0	Friendly
18.	June 11, 2017	BMO Field, Toronto	Costa Rica	4–0	6–0	Friendly
19.	November 11, 2017	Avaya Stadium, San Jose	United States	1–1	1–3	Friendly
20.	November 28, 2017	Estadio Marbella, Marbella	Norway	2–2	3–2	Friendly
21.	February 28, 2018	Bela Vista Municipal Stadium, Parchal	Sweden	1–1	1–3	2018 Algarve Cup
22.	March 7, 2018	Bela Vista Municipal Stadium, Parchal	Japan	1–0	2–0	2018 Algarve Cup
23.	October 11, 2018	H-E-B Park, Edinburg	Costa Rica	1–0	3–1	2018 CONCACAF Women's Championship
24.	October 14, 2018	Toyota Stadium, Frisco	Panama	4–0	7–0	2018 CONCACAF Women's Championship Semi-final
25.	April 8, 2019	Pinatar Stadium, Murcia	Nigeria	1–1	2–1	Friendly
26.	November 10, 2019	Yongchuan Sports Center, Chongqing	New Zealand	2–0	3–0	2019 Yongchuan International Tournament
27.	November 10, 2019	Yongchuan Sports Center, Chongqing	New Zealand	3–0	3–0	2019 Yongchuan International Tournament
28.	February 2, 2020	H-E-B Park, Edinburg	Jamaica	3–0	9–0	2020 CONCACAF Women's Olympic Qualifier
29.	February 2, 2020	H-E-B Park, Edinburg	Jamaica	4–0	9–0	2020 CONCACAF Women's Olympic Qualifier
30.	February 2, 2020	H-E-B Park, Edinburg	Jamaica	2–0	9–0	2020 CONCACAF Women's Olympic Qualifier
31.	March 10, 2020	Stade de l'Epopee, Calais, France	Brazil	2–2	2–2	2020 Tournoi de France
32.	July 24, 2021	Sapporo Dome, Sapporo, Japan	Chile	1–0	2–1	2020 Summer Olympics
33.	July 24, 2021	Sapporo Dome, Sapporo, Japan	Chile	2–0	2–1	2020 Summer Olympics
34.	February 17, 2022	Riverside Stadium, Middlesbrough, England	England	1–1	1–1	2022 Arnold Clark Cup
35.	July 5, 2022	Estadio BBVA, Guadalupe, Mexico	Trinidad and Tobago	5–0	6–0	2022 CONCACAF W Championship
36.	October 10, 2022	Estadio Municipal de Chapín, Jerez de la Frontera, Spain	Morocco	3–0	4–0	Friendly
37.	March 1, 2026	Geodis Park, Nashville, United States	Colombia	2–0	4–1	2026 SheBelieves Cup
38.	June 9, 2026	Estadio Piedades de Santa Ana, Santa Ana, Costa Rica	Costa Rica	2–0	6–0	Friendly
39.	June 9, 2026	Estadio Piedades de Santa Ana, Santa Ana, Costa Rica	Costa Rica	3–0	6–0	Friendly
40.	June 9, 2026	Estadio Piedades de Santa Ana, Santa Ana, Costa Rica	Costa Rica	4–0	6–0	Friendly

== Honours ==
Texas Tech Red Raiders

- Big 12 Conference women's soccer tournament: 2015

Manchester City

- FA Women's Super League runner-up: 2018–19
- Women's FA Cup: 2018–19, 2019–20
- FA Women's League Cup: 2018–19, 2021–22

Portland Thorns FC

- NWSL Championship: 2022

Canada

- Olympic Gold Medal: 2021
- Olympic Bronze Medal: 2016
- Algarve Cup: 2016
- Pinatar Cup: 2025
- CONCACAF W Championship runner-up: 2018, 2022

Individual

- Gatorade Colorado girls' soccer player of the year: 2012
- Big 12 Conference Freshman of the Year: 2012
- Big 12 Conference Offensive Player of the Year: 2014, 2015
- All-Big 12 first team: 2012, 2013, 2014, 2015
- NSCAA All-American: 2012 (second team), 2014 (first team)
- Big 12 Conference women's soccer tournament Offensive MVP: 2015
- MAC Hermann Trophy semifinalist: 2015
- Canada Soccer Player of the Month: November 2020, June 2022
- NWSL Best XI of the Month: October/November 2025, May 2026
- Texas Tech Athletics Hall of Fame: 2025
- NWSL Defender of the Year: 2026
- NWSL Best XI First Team: 2026

== See also ==
- List of women's footballers with 100 or more international caps
