= 2024 Notre Dame Fighting Irish women's soccer team =

American college soccer season

2024 Notre Dame Fighting Irish women's soccer

NCAA Tournament, Quarterfinals
- Conference: Atlantic Coast Conference
- U. Soc. Coaches poll: No. 6
- TopDrawerSoccer.com: No. 7
- Record: 14–4–4 (5–1–4 ACC)
- Head coach: Nate Norman (7th season)
- Assistant coaches: Dawn Siergiej (22nd season); Martin Rennie (2nd season)
- Home stadium: Alumni Stadium

2024 ACC women's soccer standings
	Conf.						Overall
Team	W		L		T	PCT	W		L		T	PCT
No. 3 Duke ‍†‍‍^{y}	9	–	0	–	1	.950	18	–	3	–	1	.841
No. 2 Wake Forest ‍‍‍^{y}	7	–	2	–	1	.750	16	–	4	–	4	.750
No. 13 Florida State ‍‍‡‍^{y}	7	–	2	–	1	.750	15	–	2	–	4	.810
No. 1 North Carolina ‍‍‍^{y}	7	–	3	–	0	.700	22	–	5	–	0	.815
No. 7 Virginia Tech ‍‍‍^{y}	6	–	2	–	2	.700	14	–	6	–	3	.674
No. 6 Notre Dame ‍‍‍^{y}	5	–	1	–	4	.700	14	–	4	–	4	.727
California ‍‍‍^{y}	5	–	4	–	1	.550	13	–	6	–	2	.667
No. 4 Stanford ‍‍‍^{y}	5	–	4	–	1	.550	16	–	5	–	2	.739
Virginia ‍‍‍^{y}	5	–	5	–	0	.500	13	–	5	–	1	.711
Boston College ‍‍‍	4	–	4	–	2	.500	12	–	5	–	2	.684
Pittsburgh ‍‍‍	3	–	5	–	2	.400	9	–	6	–	3	.583
Louisville ‍‍‍	2	–	5	–	3	.350	7	–	6	–	5	.528
SMU ‍‍‍	2	–	6	–	2	.300	6	–	9	–	2	.412
Clemson ‍‍‍	2	–	7	–	1	.250	6	–	8	–	3	.441
Miami (FL) ‍‍‍	1	–	6	–	3	.250	5	–	8	–	4	.412
NC State ‍‍‍	1	–	6	–	3	.250	4	–	10	–	4	.333
Syracuse ‍‍‍	0	–	9	–	1	.050	6	–	10	–	2	.389
† – Conference champion ‡ – 2024 ACC Tournament champion y – Invited to the NCAA Tournament; As of December 10, 2024; Rankings from United Soccer Coaches Poll; Source: The ACC

The 2024 Notre Dame Fighting Irish women's soccer team represented the University of Notre Dame during the 2024 NCAA Division I women's soccer season. It was the 37th season of the university fielding a program. The Fighting Irish were led by seventh year head coach Nate Norman and played their home games at Alumni Stadium.

The Fighting Irish started the season ranked fifteenth and had a marquee match-up with thirteenth ranked Michigan State to start the season. Notre Dame lost 2–1, but later defeated thirteenth ranked TCU 4–0 to move up to ninth in the rankings. They then traveled to Michigan, where they won 2–0 to round out their matchups with Power 4 opponents in the non-conference season. They won their remaining four non-conference games to finish 6–1–0 during the non-conference season. Their ACC campaign consisted of alternating draws and wins to start the season. They drew with Boston College, NC State, and Louisville, 2–2, 1–1, and 0–0 respectively. They defeated fourteenth ranked Virginia, Syracuse and twenty-fifth ranked California. Their next three games would be against ranked opponents. The stretch started well with a 3–0 victory over sixth ranked Stanford, which boosted the Fighting Irish's rank to seventh. They drew 3–3 with top-ranked Duke before losing 2–0 to nineteenth ranked Virginia Tech. They finished the regular season ranked thirteenth, with a defeat of Pittsburgh.

The Fighting Irish finished 12–4–4 overall and 7–1–2 in ACC play to finish in second place. As the second seed in the ACC Tournament, they lost to third seed Florida State, in the First Round. They received an at-large bid to the NCAA Tournament, where they were the fourth-seed in the Mississippi State Bracket. They defeated Milwaukee in the First Round, fifth seed Kentucky in the Second Round, and first seed Mississippi State in the Round of 16. Their quarterfinal opponent was Stanford, who they defeated in the regular season. Ultimately, Stanford prevailed in the tournament 2–0. Their ACC Tournament appearance extended their streak of qualification to six straight years, and this was the fourth straight NCAA Tournament for the Fighting Irish.

== Previous season ==
The Fighting Irish finished 14–4–4 overall and 5–1–4 in ACC play to finish in sixth place. As the sixth seed in the ACC Tournament, they lost to Clemson, who avenged their final regular season game defeat. They received an at-large bid to the NCAA Tournament, where they were the third-seed in the Florida State Bracket. They defeated Valparaiso in the First Round, before falling to Memphis in the Second Round. Memphis was the sixth seed in the bracket, but was ranked number 8 at the time and Notre Dame was ranked number 9. Their ACC Tournament appearance extended their streak of qualification to five straight years, and this was the third straight NCAA Tournament for the Fighting Irish.

== Offseason ==
=== Departures ===
Departures
Name	Number	Pos.	Height	Year	Hometown	Reason for departure
Maddie Mercado	3	FW	5'8"	Graduate Student	San Diego, California	Graduated; drafted 27th overall in the 2024 NWSL Draft
Kiki Van Zanten	7	MF	5'6"	Graduate Student	Buffalo Grove, Illinois	Graduated; drafted 21st overall in the 2024 NWSL Draft
Audrey Weiss	17	MF	5'3"	Graduate Student	Greenwood Village, Colorado	Graduated
Eva Gaetino	19	DF	5'11"	Senior	Dexter, Michigan	Graduated; signed professional contract with Paris Saint-Germain
Paige Peltier	24	FW	5'11"	Senior	Hastings, Minnesota	Graduated
Waniya Hudson	25	DF	5'6"	Graduate Student	Greece, New York	Graduated
Caroline Gray	27	DF	5'9"	Senior	Johns Creek, Georgia	Graduated
Eva Wirtz	28	DF	5'10"	Senior	Atlanta, Georgia	Graduated
Ashley Naylor	31	GK	5'11"	Senior	Manhattan Beach, California	Graduated
Kaylin Slattery	33	GK	5'6"	Senior	Cornelius, North Carolina	Graduated
Kristina Lynch	34	MF	5'7"	Graduate Student	Granger, Indiana	Graduated

=== Incoming transfers ===
Incoming transfers
Name	Number	Pos.	Height	Year	Hometown	Previous school
Reagan Pauwels	25	MF	5'6"	Graduate Student	Wall, New Jersey	Cornell
Hannah Lemieux	30	MF	5'7"	Junior	Fleming Island, Florida	Holy Cross
Katherine Montgomery	31	GK	5'7"	Graduate Student	Geneva, Illinois	Missouri State

=== Recruiting class ===
Name	Nationality	Hometown	Club	TDS Rating
Annabelle Chukwu; FW	(Canada)	Ottawa, Canada	NDC Ontario	N/A
Riley DeMartino; MF	(United States)	Potomac, Maryland	Bethesda SC Academy	3/5 stars
Izzy Engle; MF	(United States)	Edina, Minnesota	Minnesota Thunder Academy	4/5 stars
Randie Foor; DF	(United States)	Fenton, Michigan	Michigan Hawks	3/5 stars
Abigail Gemma; DF	(United States)	Flemington, New Jersey	IMG Academy	4/5 stars
Melinda Hathaway; DF	(United States)	Birmingham, Michigan	Nationals	3/5 stars
Eleanor Hodsden; FW	(United States)	Dripping Springs, Texas	Lonestar SC	4/5 stars
Lily Joseph; MF	(United States)	Hamden, Connecticut	Connecticut Rush	3/5 stars
Sonoma Kasica; GK	(United States)	St. Petersburg, Florida	Florida Premier FC	4/5 stars
Abigail Mills; DF	(United States)	Southlake, Texas	Solar Soccer Club	4/5 stars
Rowan Pearl; DF	(United States)	Indianapolis, Indiana	Indiana Fire Academy	3/5 stars
Ally Pinto; FW	(United States)	Flower Mound, Texas	Sting Dallas SC	3/5 stars
Grace Restovich; MF	(United States)	St. Louis, Missouri	St. Louis Scott Gallagher	4/5 stars

== Squad ==
=== Roster ===
As of January 28, 2025

Note: Flags indicate national team as defined under FIFA eligibility rules; some limited exceptions apply. Players may hold more than one non-FIFA nationality.

No.	Pos.	Nation	Player
0	GK	USA	Jackie Hollomon
1	GK	USA	Atlee Olofson
2	DF	CAN	Clare Logan
3	MF	USA	Izzy Engle
4	DF	USA	Leah Klenke
5	FW	USA	Ellie Ospeck
6	FW	USA	Paige Buchner
7	FW	CAN	Annabelle Chukwu
8	DF	USA	KJ Ronan
9	FW	USA	Charlie Codd
10	MF	USA	Ellie Hodsden
11	MF	USA	Sophia Fisher
12	MF	USA	Kiki Turner
13	MF	USA	Laney Matriano
14	DF	USA	Abby Gemma
16	FW	USA	Meg Mrowicki

No.	Pos.	Nation	Player
17	MF	USA	Riley DeMartino
18	MF	USA	Berkley Mensik
19	MF	USA	Ally Pinto
20	MF	USA	Abby Mills
21	MF	PHI	Chayse Ying
22	DF	CAN	Tatiana Tagne
23	MF	USA	Morgan Roy
24	MF	USA	Grace Restovich
25	MF	USA	Reagan Pauwels
26	DF	USA	Melinda Hathaway
27	MF	USA	Lily Joseph
28	GK	USA	Sonoma Kasica
29	DF	USA	Rowan Pearl
30	MF	USA	Hannah Lemieux
31	GK	USA	Katherine Montgomery
34	FW	USA	Randie Foor

== Team management ==
Position	Staff
Head coach	Nate Norman
Assistant Coach	Dawn Siergiej
Assistant Coach	Martin Rennie
Assistant Coach/Operations	Emily Voltz

== Schedule ==
Date Time, TV	Rank^{#}	Opponent^{#}	Result	Record	Site City, State
Exhibition
August 6*; 6:00 p.m.	No. 15	at Western Michigan	None Reported	–	WMU Soccer Complex; Kalamazoo, MI
August 10*; 4:00 p.m.	No. 15	Indiana	None Reported	–	Alumni Stadium; Notre Dame, IN
Non-conference regular season
August 15*; 7:00 p.m., ACCNX	No. 15	No. 13 Michigan State	L 1–2	0–1–0	Alumni Stadium (361); Notre Dame, IN
August 18*; 6:00 p.m., ESPN+	No. 15	at Samford	W 6–0	1–1–0	Samford Soccer Complex (476); Homewood, AL
August 25*; 1:00 p.m., ACCNX	No. 14	No. 13 TCU	W 4–0	2–1–0	Alumni Stadium (705); Notre Dame, IN
August 29*; 7:00 p.m., BTN+	No. 9	at Michigan	W 2–0	3–1–0	U-M Soccer Stadium (1,563); Ann Arbor, MI
September 1*; 7:00 p.m., FloFC	No. 9	at Butler	W 1–0	4–1–0	Butler Bowl (649); Indianapolis, IN
September 5*; 7:00 p.m., ACCNX	No. 9т	Northern Illinois	W 4–0	5–1–0	Alumni Stadium (593); Notre Dame, IN
September 8*; 1:30 p.m., ACCN	No. 9т	Marquette	W 5–0	6–1–0	Alumni Stadium (784); Notre Dame, IN
ACC regular season
September 12; 7:00 p.m., ACCN	No. 13	at Boston College	T 2–2	6–1–1 (0–0–1)	Newton Campus Soccer Field (796); Chestnut Hill, MA
September 22; 7:00 p.m., ACCNX	No. 16	at No. 14 Virginia	W 1–0	7–1–1 (1–0–1)	Klöckner Stadium (1,311); Charlottesville, VA
September 26; 7:00 p.m., ACCNX	No. 13	NC State	T 1–1	7–1–2 (1–0–2)	Alumni Stadium (721); Notre Dame, IN
October 5; 1:00 p.m., ACCNX	No. 17	at Syracuse	W 3–0	8–1–2 (2–0–2)	SU Soccer Stadium (365); Syracuse, NY
October 12; 7:00 p.m., ACCNX	No. 13	at Louisville	T 0–0	8–1–3 (2–0–3)	Lynn Stadium (375); Louisville, KY
October 17; 7:00 p.m., ACCNX	No. 12	No. 25 California	W 5–2	9–1–3 (3–0–3)	Alumni Stadium (415); Notre Dame, IN
October 20; 2:00 p.m., ACCN	No. 12	No. 6 Stanford	W 3–0	10–1–3 (4–0–3)	Alumni Stadium (901); Notre Dame, IN
October 24; 7:00 p.m., ACCNX	No. 7	at No. 1 Duke	T 3–3	10–1–4 (4–0–4)	Koskinen Stadium (1,049); Durham, NC
October 27; 1:00 p.m., ACCNX	No. 7	No. 19 Virginia Tech	L 0–2	10–2–4 (4–1–4)	Alumni Stadium (394); Notre Dame, IN
October 31; 7:00 p.m., ACCNX	No. 13	Pittsburgh	W 3–2	11–2–4 (5–1–4)	Alumni Stadium (277); Notre Dame, IN
ACC tournament
November 3; 8:00 p.m., ACCN	(6) No. 13	vs. (3) No. 6 Florida State; First Round	L 1–2	11–3–4	Seminole Soccer Complex (1,166); Tallahassee, FL
NCAA tournament
November 15; 7:00 p.m., ESPN+	(4) No. 13	Milwaukee; First Round	W 5–1	12–3–4	Alumni Stadium (1,030); Notre Dame, IN
November 22; 3:30 p.m., ESPN+	(4) No. 13	vs. (5) Kentucky; Second Round	W 3–1	13–3–4	MSU Soccer Field (290); Starkville, MS
November 24; 4:00 p.m., ESPN+	(4) No. 13	at (1) No. 2 Mississippi State; Round of 16	W 2–0	14–3–4	MSU Soccer Field (3,772); Starkville, MS
November 29; 5:00 p.m., ESPN+	(4) No. 13	at (3) No. 14т Stanford; Quarterfinals	L 0–2	14–4–4	Cagan Stadium (2,042); Stanford, CA
*Non-conference game. ^{#}Rankings from United Soccer Coaches. (#) Tournament seedings in parentheses. All times are in Eastern.

== Awards and honors ==
Recipient	Award	Date	Ref.
Leah Klenke	Pre-season All-ACC Team	August 8, 2024	
Malia McMahon	ACC Co-Defensive Player of the Week – Week 7	October 1, 2024	
Ellie Hodsden	ACC Offensive Player of the Week – Week 10	October 22, 2024	
Leah Klenke	ACC Co-Defensive Player of the Week – Week 10	October 22, 2024	
Izzy Engle	ACC Freshman of the Year	November 6, 2024	
Leah Klenke	All-ACC First Team	November 6, 2024	
Izzy Engle	All-ACC First Team	November 6, 2024	
Annabelle Chukwu	All-ACC Third Team	November 6, 2024	
Lily Joseph	All-ACC Third Team	November 6, 2024	
Annabelle Chukwu	ACC All-Freshman Team	November 6, 2024	
Izzy Engle	ACC All-Freshman Team	November 6, 2024	
Ellie Hodsden	ACC All-Freshman Team	November 6, 2024	
Lily Joseph	ACC All-Freshman Team	November 6, 2024	

== Rankings ==
Ranking movements Legend: ██ Increase in ranking ██ Decrease in ranking т = Tied with team above or below
	Week																	
Poll	Pre	1	2	3	4	5	6	7	8	9	10	11	12	13	14	15	16	Final
United Soccer	15	14	9	9т	13	16	13	17	13	12	7	13	Not released					6
TopDrawer Soccer	12	20	17	13	11	16	9	9	8	11	7	10	13	14	14	6	7	7
