= 2024 Miami Hurricanes women's soccer team =

American college soccer season

2024 Miami Hurricanes women's soccer
- Conference: Atlantic Coast Conference
- Record: 5–8–4 (1–6–3 ACC)
- Head coach: Ken Masuhr (1st season)
- Assistant coaches: Kelly Keelan (1st season); Brooke Bradley (1st season); Peter-John Falloon (1st season)
- Captains: Adrianna Serna; Julia Edwards; Reese Wheeler; Skylah Klein
- Home stadium: Cobb Stadium

2024 ACC women's soccer standings
	Conf.						Overall
Team	W		L		T	PCT	W		L		T	PCT
No. 3 Duke ‍†‍‍^{y}	9	–	0	–	1	.950	18	–	3	–	1	.841
No. 2 Wake Forest ‍‍‍^{y}	7	–	2	–	1	.750	16	–	4	–	4	.750
No. 13 Florida State ‍‍‡‍^{y}	7	–	2	–	1	.750	15	–	2	–	4	.810
No. 1 North Carolina ‍‍‍^{y}	7	–	3	–	0	.700	22	–	5	–	0	.815
No. 7 Virginia Tech ‍‍‍^{y}	6	–	2	–	2	.700	14	–	6	–	3	.674
No. 6 Notre Dame ‍‍‍^{y}	5	–	1	–	4	.700	14	–	4	–	4	.727
California ‍‍‍^{y}	5	–	4	–	1	.550	13	–	6	–	2	.667
No. 4 Stanford ‍‍‍^{y}	5	–	4	–	1	.550	16	–	5	–	2	.739
Virginia ‍‍‍^{y}	5	–	5	–	0	.500	13	–	5	–	1	.711
Boston College ‍‍‍	4	–	4	–	2	.500	12	–	5	–	2	.684
Pittsburgh ‍‍‍	3	–	5	–	2	.400	9	–	6	–	3	.583
Louisville ‍‍‍	2	–	5	–	3	.350	7	–	6	–	5	.528
SMU ‍‍‍	2	–	6	–	2	.300	6	–	9	–	2	.412
Clemson ‍‍‍	2	–	7	–	1	.250	6	–	8	–	3	.441
Miami (FL) ‍‍‍	1	–	6	–	3	.250	5	–	8	–	4	.412
NC State ‍‍‍	1	–	6	–	3	.250	4	–	10	–	4	.333
Syracuse ‍‍‍	0	–	9	–	1	.050	6	–	10	–	2	.389
† – Conference champion ‡ – 2024 ACC Tournament champion y – Invited to the NCAA Tournament; As of December 10, 2024; Rankings from United Soccer Coaches Poll; Source: The ACC

The 2024 Miami Hurricanes women's soccer team represented University of Miami during the 2024 NCAA Division I women's soccer season. The Hurricanes were led by head coach Ken Masuhr, in his first season. They played home games at Cobb Stadium. This was the team's 26th season playing organized women's college soccer and their 21st playing in the Atlantic Coast Conference. Masuhr was hired as the new head coach on December 5, 2023.

The season did not start well under their new coach, as the Hurricanes lost two of their first three games, drawing the other. They improved their play to win their next three games, including a 2–1 victory over Power 5 opponent Missouri. Their run ended with the start of ACC play, where they lost 3–1 to second ranked Virginia. They would draw 3–3 with SMU before losing to sixth ranked Stanford and California. They earned a 0–0 draw against Virginia Tech before defeating Florida Atlantic. The Hurricanes went 1–3–1 over their final five ACC games with a win over Syracuse and the draw coming against Pittsburgh. In their final game of the season, they lost 0–1 to then sixth ranked Florida State

The Hurricanes finished the season 5–8–4 overall and 1–6–3 in ACC play to finish in fifteenth place. They did not qualify for the ACC Tournament and were not invited to the NCAA Tournament.

== Previous season ==
The Hurricanes finished the season 3–10–4 overall and 2–7–1 in ACC play to finish in twelfth place. They did not qualify for the ACC Tournament and were not invited to the NCAA Tournament. Their three wins were a program low for a full season, with only the shortened 2020 season resulting in fewer wins. This was the second year in a row Miami finished with a 2–7–1 conference record, and the third time in Barnes' tenure. After the season, it was announced that Barnes would no longer continue as head coach.

== Offseason ==
=== Departures ===
Departures
Name	Number	Pos.	Height	Year	Hometown	Reason for departure
Claireese Foley	0	GK	5'11"	Freshman	Prosper, Texas	—
Maya Rogers	2	FW	5'7"	Junior	Vancouver, Canada	—
Claire Llewellyn	5	MF	5'6"	Senior	Lake Orion, Michigan	Graduated
Sonia Neighbors	6	FW	5'5"	Freshman	Montclair, New Jersey	—
Sophia Broz	8	DF	5'8"	Freshman	Matthews, North Carolina	Transferred to George Washington
Tusca Mahmoudpour	9	FW	5'3"	Sophomore	Lorton, Virginia	—
Zoey Lee	11	MF	5'5"	(redshirt) Junior	Madison, Alabama	Graduated
Gianna Angelillo	12	MF	5'6"	Freshman	Glastonbury, Connecticut	Transferred to Louisville
Katerina Molina	13	FW	5'7"	Senior	Miami, Florida	Graduated
Hannah Dawbarn	15	MF	5'5"	(redshirt) Junior	High Wycome, England	Graduated
Delaney Brown	19	DF	5'6"	Senior	Johns Creek, Georgia	Graduated
Lauren Meeks	21	MF	5'8"	Junior	Fairfax Station, Virginia	Transferred to Purdue
Taylor Shell	22	DF	5'2"	Graduate Student	Richmond, Virginia	Graduated
Jordan Felton	23	MF	5'3"	Junior	Waldorf, Maryland	—
Emma Tucker	26	DF	5'4"	Graduate Student	Marshfield, Massachusetts	Graduated
Nyema Freeman	30	DF	5'4"	Freshman	Cooper City, Florida	—

=== Incoming transfers ===
Incoming transfers
Name	Number	Pos.	Height	Year	Hometown	Previous school
Dieynaba Ndaw	2	FW	5'6"	Graduate Student	Dakar, Senegal	Duke
Tori Grambo	6	DF/FW	5'4"	Graduate Student	St. Johns, Florida	Florida
Crosby Nicholson	13	MF	5'11"	Sophomore	Palm Harbor, Florida	Kansas State
Grace Hurren	16	DF/MF	5'8"	Graduate Student	Moorestown, New Jersey	Columbia
Maddie Landers	19	MF	5'7"	Sophomore	North Andover, Massachusetts	Boston College
Kyla Gallagher	21	FW	5'7"	Graduate Student	Farmington, Connecticut	Providence
Zoe Shepherd	30	FW	5'6"	Junior	Novato, California	Arkansas
Hanna Moore	33	DF	5'8"	Graduate Student	Eagle Mountain, Utah	Iowa State

=== Recruiting class ===
Name	Nationality	Hometown	Club	TDS Rating
Ciara Alarcon; MF	(United States)	West Palm Beach, Florida	FC Prime	3/5 stars
Giovana Canali; FW	(United States)	Boca Raton, Florida	FC Prime	3/5 stars
Sage Carey; FW	(United States)	Weston, Florida	Weston FC	3/5 stars
Lana Djuranovic; MF	(United States)	Scarborough, Maine	Seacoast United	3/5 stars
Faith Graziano; MF	(United States)	Middlebury, Connecticut	Connecticut FC	4/5 stars
Jessica Kaye; MF	(United States)	Ridgewood, New Jersey	World Class FC	3/5 stars
Gray Willson; GK	(United States)	Rocklin, California	Jan Juan SC	3/5 stars
Jordyn Womack; FW	(United States)	Las Vegas, Nevada	Heat FC	3/5 stars

== Squad ==
=== Roster ===
As of December 15, 2024

Note: Flags indicate national team as defined under FIFA eligibility rules; some limited exceptions apply. Players may hold more than one non-FIFA nationality.

No.	Pos.	Nation	Player
00	GK	USA	Claireese Foley
2	FW	SEN	Dieynaba Ndaw
3	DF	USA	Adrianna Serna
4	DF	USA	Emilie McCartney
5	FW	USA	Jordyn Womack
6	DF	USA	Tori Grambo
7	FW	USA	Caroline Hood
8	MF	USA	Ciara Alarocn
9	FW	USA	Giovana Canali
10	MF	USA	Julia Edwards
11	FW	USA	Sonia Neighbors
12	FW	USA	Lana Djuranovic
13	MF	USA	Crosby Nicholson
14	FW	USA	Emma Pidding
15	MF	USA	Gisselle Kozarski

No.	Pos.	Nation	Player
16	DF	USA	Grace Hurren
17	FW	USA	Moira Flynn
18	DF	USA	Jordan Losey
19	MF	USA	Maddie Landers
20	DF	USA	Reese Wheeler
21	FW	USA	Kyla Gallagher
22	FW	USA	Megan Morgan
23	MF	USA	Faith Graziano
25	FW	USA	Jessica Kaye
29	DF	USA	Hallie Salas
30	FW	USA	Zoe Shepherd
33	DF	USA	Hanna Moore
45	GK	USA	Gray Willson
48	FW	USA	Sage Carey

=== Team management ===
Position	Staff
Head coach	Ken Masuhr
Assistant Coach	Kelly Keelan
Assistant Coach	Brooke Bradley
Assistant Coach	Peter-John Falloon
Athletic Trainer	Karl Rennalls

== Schedule ==
Date Time, TV	Rank^{#}	Opponent^{#}	Result	Record	Site (Attendance) City, State
Exhibition
August 4*; 11:00 a.m.		at Florida Gulf Coast	Cancelled	–	FGCU Soccer Complex; Fort Myers, FL
August 10*; 6:00 p.m.		at UCF	None Reported	–	UCF Soccer and Track Stadium; Orlando, FL
Regular season
August 15*; 6:00 p.m., ACCNX		North Florida	L 0–1	0–1–0	Cobb Stadium (248); Coral Gables, FL
August 18*; 6:00 p.m., ESPN+		at Florida Atlantic	T 1–1	0–1–1	FAU Soccer Stadium (462); Boca Raton, FL
August 24*; 7:00 p.m., ESPN+		at Princeton	L 0–1	0–2–1	Roberts Stadium (1,805); Princeton, NJ
August 29*; 7:00 p.m., ACCNX		Missouri	W 2–1	1–2–1	Cobb Stadium (248); Coral Gables, FL
September 1*; 7:00 p.m., ACCNX		FIU	W 1–0	2–2–1	Cobb Stadium (495); Coral Gables, FL
September 5*; 7:00 p.m., ACCNX		Southeastern Louisiana	W 4–1	3–2–1	Cobb Stadium (215); Coral Gables, FL
September 12; 7:00 p.m., ACCNX		No. 2 Virginia	L 1–3	3–3–1 (0–1–0)	Cobb Stadium (389); Coral Gables, FL
September 19; 7:00 p.m., ACCNX		SMU	T 3–3	3–3–2 (0–1–1)	Cobb Stadium (315); Coral Gables, FL
September 26; 10:00 p.m., ACCNX		at No. 6 Stanford	L 0–1	3–4–2 (0–2–1)	Cagan Stadium (1,767); Stanford, CA
September 29; 4:00 p.m., ACCNX		at California	L 2–3	3–5–2 (0–3–1)	Edwards Stadium (315); Berkeley, CA
October 3; 8:00 p.m., ACCN		Virginia Tech	T 0–0	3–5–3 (0–3–2)	Cobb Stadium (315); Coral Gables, FL
October 6; 5:00 p.m., ACCNX		at Florida Atlantic	W 1–0	4–5–3	Cobb Stadium (175); Coral Gables, FL
October 12; 7:00 p.m., ACCNX		at Clemson	L 1–2	4–6–3 (0–4–2)	Riggs Field (1,374); Clemson, SC
October 17; 7:00 p.m., ACCNX		Pittsburgh	T 0–0	4–6–4 (0–4–3)	Cobb Stadium (712); Coral Gables, FL
October 24; 7:00 p.m., ACCNX		at Syracuse	W 3–1	5–6–4 (1–4–3)	SU Soccer Stadium (224); Syracuse, NY
October 27; 12:30 p.m., ACCNX		at Boston College	L 0–3	5–7–4 (1–5–3)	Newton Campus Soccer Field (252); Chestnut Hill, MA
October 31; 6:00 p.m., ACCN		No. 6 Florida State; Rivalry	L 0–1	5–8–4 (1–6–3)	Cobb Stadium (428); Coral Gables, FL
*Non-conference game. ^{#}Rankings from United Soccer Coaches. (#) Tournament seedings in parentheses.

== Awards and honors ==
Recipient	Award	Date	Ref.
Giovana Canali	ACC Offensive Player of the Week – Week 3	September 3, 2024	
Claireese Foley	ACC Defensive Player of the Week – Week 8	October 7, 2024	
Emile McCartney	ACC Co-Defensive Player of the Week – Week 10	October 22, 2024	
Giovana Canali	All-ACC Third Team	November 6, 2024	
Giovana Canali	ACC All-Freshman Team	November 6, 2024	

== Rankings ==
Ranking movements Legend: — = Not ranked
	Week																	
Poll	Pre	1	2	3	4	5	6	7	8	9	10	11	12	13	14	15	16	Final
United Soccer	—	—	—	—	—	—	—	—	—	—	—	—	Not released					—
TopDrawer Soccer	—	—	—	—	—	—	—	—	—	—	—	—	—	—	—	—	—	—
