= 2024 Syracuse Orange women's soccer team =

American college soccer season

2024 Syracuse Orange women's soccer
- Conference: Atlantic Coast Conference
- Record: 6–10–2 (0–9–1 ACC)
- Head coach: Nicky Adams (6th season)
- Assistant coaches: Brandon DeNoyer (5th season); Alex Zaroyan (2nd season)
- Home stadium: SU Soccer Stadium

2024 ACC women's soccer standings
	Conf.						Overall
Team	W		L		T	PCT	W		L		T	PCT
No. 3 Duke ‍†‍‍^{y}	9	–	0	–	1	.950	18	–	3	–	1	.841
No. 2 Wake Forest ‍‍‍^{y}	7	–	2	–	1	.750	16	–	4	–	4	.750
No. 13 Florida State ‍‍‡‍^{y}	7	–	2	–	1	.750	15	–	2	–	4	.810
No. 1 North Carolina ‍‍‍^{y}	7	–	3	–	0	.700	22	–	5	–	0	.815
No. 7 Virginia Tech ‍‍‍^{y}	6	–	2	–	2	.700	14	–	6	–	3	.674
No. 6 Notre Dame ‍‍‍^{y}	5	–	1	–	4	.700	14	–	4	–	4	.727
California ‍‍‍^{y}	5	–	4	–	1	.550	13	–	6	–	2	.667
No. 4 Stanford ‍‍‍^{y}	5	–	4	–	1	.550	16	–	5	–	2	.739
Virginia ‍‍‍^{y}	5	–	5	–	0	.500	13	–	5	–	1	.711
Boston College ‍‍‍	4	–	4	–	2	.500	12	–	5	–	2	.684
Pittsburgh ‍‍‍	3	–	5	–	2	.400	9	–	6	–	3	.583
Louisville ‍‍‍	2	–	5	–	3	.350	7	–	6	–	5	.528
SMU ‍‍‍	2	–	6	–	2	.300	6	–	9	–	2	.412
Clemson ‍‍‍	2	–	7	–	1	.250	6	–	8	–	3	.441
Miami (FL) ‍‍‍	1	–	6	–	3	.250	5	–	8	–	4	.412
NC State ‍‍‍	1	–	6	–	3	.250	4	–	10	–	4	.333
Syracuse ‍‍‍	0	–	9	–	1	.050	6	–	10	–	2	.389
† – Conference champion ‡ – 2024 ACC Tournament champion y – Invited to the NCAA Tournament; As of December 10, 2024; Rankings from United Soccer Coaches Poll; Source: The ACC

The 2024 Syracuse Orange women's soccer team represented Syracuse University during the 2024 NCAA Division I women's soccer season. The Orange were led by head coach Nicky Adams, in her sixth season. They played home games at SU Soccer Stadium in Syracuse, New York. This was the team's 28th season playing organized women's college soccer, and their 11th playing in the Atlantic Coast Conference.

The season started well with a win over UMass. The team followed that with a tie against Maine before winning three straight games. That winning streak included a win over Power 5 opponent Northwestern. The streak was broken by a loss to Colgate on September 1. The Orange finished their non-conference schedule with two more wins to finish 6–1–1. Their positive results did not carry into the ACC season, as they lost their first seven ACC games. They had close results at Virginia Tech and at North Carolina, only losing each game by a single goal. In that seven-game stretch, they played four ranked teams, including three who were in the top ten at the time of the match. Their first ACC point came agasint NC State on October 17, a 1–1 draw. The Orange lost their final two games, both by a score of 1–2.

The Orange finished the season 6–10–2, 0–9–1 in ACC play to finish in seventeenth place. They did not qualify for the ACC Tournament. They were not invited to the NCAA Tournament.

== Previous season ==
The Orange finished the season 2–14–2, 0–9–1 in ACC play to finish in fourteenth place. They did not qualify for the ACC Tournament. They were not invited to the NCAA Tournament.

== Offseason ==
=== Departures ===
Departures
Name	Number	Pos.	Height	Year	Hometown	Reason for departure
Mags Thornton	3	MF	5'6"	Junior	West Chester, Pennsylvania	Graduated
Alyssa Abramson	5	DF/MF	5'5"	Sophomore	Medford, New York	Transferred to Kentucky
Zoe Van de Cloot	8	DF	5'8"	Senior	Zoersel, Belgium	Graduated
Hannah Pilley	10	FW	5'10"	Senior	Auckland, New Zealand	Graduated
Raia James	19	FW/MF	5'4"	Senior	Ballston Lake, New York	Graduated
Grace Gillard	27	DF	5'9"	Sophomore	Bedford, England	Transferred to Arizona State

=== Incoming transfers ===
Incoming transfers
Name	Number	Pos.	Height	Year	Hometown	Previous school
Julia Coval	5	MF	5'6"	Sophomore	Stockholm, Sweden	Gardner–Webb
Mia Klammer	6	FW	5'9"	Senior	Mahopac, New York	Saint Rose
Cierra Collins	22	DF	5'3"	Senior	Louisville, Kentucky	Mississippi State
Julia Dening	23	FW	5'10"	Sophomore	Remsen, New York	Siena
Blythe Braun	27	GK	5'9"	Junior	Hinsdale, Illinois	Florida Atlantic
Dalani Stephens	32	MF	5'8"	Graduate Student	Round Hill, Virginia	UNC Greensboro
Moo Galbus	33	FW	5'8"	Sophomore	Wilmington, Delaware	North Carolina

=== Recruiting class ===
Name	Nationality	Hometown	Club	TDS Rating
Anna Croyle; DF	(United States)	Sellersville, Pennsylvania	Philadelphia Ukrainian Nationals	3/5 stars
Caitlin Driscoll; MF	(United States)	Sherborn, Massachusetts	NEFC	3/5 stars
Alexandra Fouts; FW	(United States)	Lake Orion, Michigan	Nationals	3/5 stars
Amanda Goldstein; MF	(United States)	Redondo Beach, California	Fram Soccer Club	3/5 stars
Lilly Heaslet; GK	(United States)	Charlotte, North Carolina	Charlotte Development Academy	N/A
Leda Naihin; FW	(Canada)	Markham, Canada	Markham FC	N/A
Vita Naihin; FW	(Canada)	Markham, Canada	Markham FC	N/A
Iba Oching; FW	(Canada)	Coquitlam, Canada	Whitecaps Elite REX	N/A
Gabrielle Wisbeck; MF	(United States)	Severna Park, Maryland	Bethesda SC	3/5 stars

== Squad ==
=== Roster ===
As of November 18, 2024

Note: Flags indicate national team as defined under FIFA eligibility rules; some limited exceptions apply. Players may hold more than one non-FIFA nationality.

No.	Pos.	Nation	Player
0	GK	USA	Sam Haley
1	GK	USA	Abby Ross
2	MF	USA	Liesel Odden
3	MF	USA	Caitlin Driscoll
4	FW	USA	Ashley Rauch
5	MF	SWE	Julia Coval
6	FW	USA	Mia Klammer
7	FW	USA	Ava Uribe
8	FW	CAN	Vita Naihin
9	DF	USA	Kendyl Lauher
10	MF	USA	Gabby Wisbeck
11	FW	CAN	Iba Oching
12	DF	USA	Aleena Ulke
13	FW	USA	Anna Rupert
14	DF	USA	Kate Murphy
15	FW	USA	Maya McDermott
16	FW	CAN	Leda Naihin

No.	Pos.	Nation	Player
17	DF	CAN	Kylen Grant
18	FW	USA	Aysia Cobb
19	DF	USA	Anna Croyle
20	DF	USA	Emma Klein
21	MF	USA	Mackenzie Dupre
22	DF	USA	Cierra Collins
23	FW	USA	Julia Dening
24	DF	USA	Caro Monterrey
25	DF	USA	Grace Franklin
26	FW	USA	Erin Flurey
27	GK	USA	Blythe Braun
28	FW	USA	Allie Fouts
29	GK	USA	Lilly Heaslet
30	GK	USA	Shea Vanderbosch
31	MF	USA	Amanda Goldstein
32	MF	USA	Dalani Stephens
33	FW	USA	Moo Galbus

=== Team management ===
Position	Staff
Head coach	Nicky Thrasher Adams
Assistant coach	Brandon DeNoyer
Assistant coach	Alex Zaroyan

== Schedule ==
Date Time, TV	Rank^{#}	Opponent^{#}	Result	Record	Site (Attendance) City, State
Exhibition
August 8*; 7:00 p.m.		at Albany	W 5–0	–	Ford Field; Albany, NY
August 11*; 7:00 p.m.		Colgate	W 1–0	–	SU Soccer Stadium; Syracuse, NY
Non-conference regular season
August 15*; 7:00 p.m., ACCNX		UMass	W 2–0	1–0–0	SU Soccer Stadium (293); Syracuse, NY
August 18*; 1:00 p.m., ACCNX		Maine	T 1–1	1–0–1	SU Soccer Stadium (224); Syracuse, NY
August 22*; 7:00 p.m., ACCNX		Siena	W 2–0	2–0–1	SU Soccer Stadium (384); Syracuse, NY
August 25*; 1:00 p.m., ACCNX		Mercyhurst	W 5–0	3–0–1	SU Soccer Stadium (263); Syracuse, NY
August 29*; 4:00 p.m., ACCNX		Northwestern	W 1–0	4–0–1	SU Soccer Stadium (170); Syracuse, NY
September 1*; 1:00 p.m., ESPN+		at Colgate	L 1–2	4–1–1	Berman Field (541); Hamilton, NY
September 5*; 6:00 p.m., ESPN+		at Binghamton	W 1–0	5–1–1	Bearcats Sports Complex (219); Vestal, NY
September 8*; 4:00 p.m., ACCNX		St. Bonaventure	W 3–0	6–1–1	SU Soccer Stadium; Syracuse, NY
ACC regular season
September 12; 8:00 p.m., ACCNX		at SMU	L 1–4	6–2–1 (0–1–0)	Washburne Stadium (412); Dallas, TX
September 15; 12:00 p.m., ACCN		at Virginia Tech	L 1–2	6–3–1 (0–2–0)	Thompson Field (733); Blacksburg, VA
September 19; 7:00 p.m., ACCNX		at No. 2 Florida State	L 1–5	6–4–1 (0–3–0)	Seminole Soccer Complex (1,234); Tallahassee, FL
September 22; 1:00 p.m., ACCNX		No. 8 North Carolina	L 0–1	6–5–1 (0–4–0)	SU Soccer Stadium (857); Syracuse, NY
September 29; 1:00 p.m., ACCNX		No. 5 Wake Forest	L 0–3	6–6–1 (0–5–0)	SU Soccer Stadium (944); Syracuse, NY
October 5; 1:00 p.m., ACCNX		No. 17 Notre Dame	L 0–3	6–7–1 (0–6–0)	SU Soccer Stadium (365); Syracuse, NY
October 13; 1:30 p.m., ACCN		at Pittsburgh	L 0–3	6–8–1 (0–7–0)	Ambrose Urbanic Field (824); Pittsburgh, PA
October 17; 7:00 p.m., ACCNX		NC State	T 1–1	6–8–2 (0–7–1)	SU Soccer Stadium (234); Syracuse, NY
October 24; 7:00 p.m., ACCNX		Miami (FL)	L 1–3	6–9–2 (0–8–1)	SU Soccer Stadium (224); Syracuse, NY
October 31; 7:00 p.m., ACCNX		at Boston College	L 1–3	6–10–2 (0–9–1)	Newton Campus Soccer Field (623); Chestnut Hill, MA
*Non-conference game. ^{#}Rankings from United Soccer Coaches. (#) Tournament seedings in parentheses.

== Rankings ==
Ranking movements Legend: — = Not ranked
	Week																	
Poll	Pre	1	2	3	4	5	6	7	8	9	10	11	12	13	14	15	16	Final
United Soccer	—	—	—	—	—	—	—	—	—	—	—	—	Not released					—
TopDrawer Soccer	—	—	—	—	—	—	—	—	—	—	—	—	—	—	—	—	—	
