= 2024 Stanford Cardinal women's soccer team =

American college soccer season

2024 Stanford Cardinal women's soccer

NCAA Tournament, College Cup
- Conference: Atlantic Coast Conference
- U. Soc. Coaches poll: No. 4
- TopDrawerSoccer.com: No. 4
- Record: 16–5–2 (5–4–1 ACC)
- Head coach: Paul Ratcliffe (22nd season)
- Assistant coaches: Paul Hart (4th season); Daisy Sanchez (3rd season); Brianna Visalli (1st season)
- Home stadium: Cagan Stadium

2024 ACC women's soccer standings
	Conf.						Overall
Team	W		L		T	PCT	W		L		T	PCT
No. 3 Duke ‍†‍‍^{y}	9	–	0	–	1	.950	18	–	3	–	1	.841
No. 2 Wake Forest ‍‍‍^{y}	7	–	2	–	1	.750	16	–	4	–	4	.750
No. 13 Florida State ‍‍‡‍^{y}	7	–	2	–	1	.750	15	–	2	–	4	.810
No. 1 North Carolina ‍‍‍^{y}	7	–	3	–	0	.700	22	–	5	–	0	.815
No. 7 Virginia Tech ‍‍‍^{y}	6	–	2	–	2	.700	14	–	6	–	3	.674
No. 6 Notre Dame ‍‍‍^{y}	5	–	1	–	4	.700	14	–	4	–	4	.727
California ‍‍‍^{y}	5	–	4	–	1	.550	13	–	6	–	2	.667
No. 4 Stanford ‍‍‍^{y}	5	–	4	–	1	.550	16	–	5	–	2	.739
Virginia ‍‍‍^{y}	5	–	5	–	0	.500	13	–	5	–	1	.711
Boston College ‍‍‍	4	–	4	–	2	.500	12	–	5	–	2	.684
Pittsburgh ‍‍‍	3	–	5	–	2	.400	9	–	6	–	3	.583
Louisville ‍‍‍	2	–	5	–	3	.350	7	–	6	–	5	.528
SMU ‍‍‍	2	–	6	–	2	.300	6	–	9	–	2	.412
Clemson ‍‍‍	2	–	7	–	1	.250	6	–	8	–	3	.441
Miami (FL) ‍‍‍	1	–	6	–	3	.250	5	–	8	–	4	.412
NC State ‍‍‍	1	–	6	–	3	.250	4	–	10	–	4	.333
Syracuse ‍‍‍	0	–	9	–	1	.050	6	–	10	–	2	.389
† – Conference champion ‡ – 2024 ACC Tournament champion y – Invited to the NCAA Tournament; As of December 10, 2024; Rankings from United Soccer Coaches Poll; Source: The ACC

The 2024 Stanford Cardinal women's soccer team represented Stanford University during the 2024 NCAA Division I women's soccer season. The Cardinal were led by head coach Paul Ratcliffe, in his twenty-second season. They played their home games at Cagan Stadium in Stanford, California. This was the team's 41st season playing organized women's college soccer and their 1st playing in the Atlantic Coast Conference.

Stanford began the season ranked second overall and swept through their non-conference season, winning all of their eight games. They only allowed two goals during non-conference play and faced one Power 4 opponent, USC, where they won 2–1. After a 2–0 defeat of Washington State, they ascended to the number one spot in the rankings. The only other goal they allowed was during a 3–1 road victory over San Diego State. They also defeated eleventh ranked Santa Clara to finish the non-conference season. Their first loss came in their ACC conference opener against thirteenth ranked Wake Forest, 1–0. They followed that with a 2–0 victory over NC State, but fell to sixth in the rankings. They went 2–0–1 over their next three matches with the draw coming against Pittsburgh. The next two games were against first ranked Duke and second ranked North Carolina. They split the two games, losing to Duke, but defeating North Carolina. They followed that with a win against Louisville. They finished their ACC season with two losses, one to twelfth ranked Notre Dame and to rivals California.

The Cardinal finished the season 16–5–2 overall and 5–4–1 in ACC play to finish in tie for seventh place. They did not qualify for the ACC Tournament. They received an at-large bid to the NCAA Tournament and were the second seed in the Mississippi State Bracket. They defeated UC Santa Barbara in the First Round, UConn in the Second Round, and advanced in penalties verus second-seed Arkansas in the Round of 16 to reach the Quarterfinals. There they avenged a regular season loss to Notre Dame to advance to the College Cup. In the Semifinals they had a rematch with Wake Forest, but they again lost 1–0 to end their season.

== Previous season ==
The Cardinal finished the season 20–1–4 overall and 8–0–3 in Pac-12 play to finish in second place. They received an at-large bid to the NCAA Tournament and were the second seed in the UCLA Bracket. They defeated Pepperdine in the First Round, seventh-seed South Carolina in the Second Round, and sixth-seed Mississippi State in the Round of 16 to reach the Quarterfinals. There they defeated fifth-seed Nebraska in overtime to advance to the College Cup. In the Semifinals they defeated BYU 2–1 to reach the final. Stanford entered the final undefeated, but lost 5–1 to Florida State and finished runner up.

== Offseason ==
=== Departures ===
Departures
Name	Number	Pos.	Height	Year	Hometown	Reason for departure
Ryan Campbell	1	GK	5'11"	Senior	Laguna Beach, California	Graduated
Katie Duong	6	MF	5'4"	Graduate Student	Portland, Oregon	Graduated; drafted 53rd overall in the 2024 NWSL Draft
Astrid Wheeler	9	MF	5'5"	Senior	Atlanta, Georgia	Graduated
Maya Doms	10	MF	5'6"	Graduate Student	Davis, California	Graduated; drafted 8th overall in the 2024 NWSL Draft
Catherine Paulson	11	MF/FW	5'7"	(redshirt) Junior	Los Altos, California	Graduated
Mia Watanabe	13	FW	5'7"	Senior	Kaneohe, Hawaii	Graduated
Julia Leontini	14	MF	5'7"	Senior	Danville, California	Graduated
Kennedy Wesley	15	DF	5'5"	Graduate Student	Rossmoor, California	Graduated; drafted 12th overall in the 2024 NWSL Draft
Sarah Paulson	16	DF	5'7"	(redshirt) Junior	Los Altos, California	Graduated
Esha Gupta	26	DF	5'7"	(redshirt) Freshman	Mountain View, California	—

=== Recruiting class ===
Name	Nationality	Hometown	Club	TDS Rating
Elizabeth Boamah; FW	(United States)	San Diego, California	San Diego Surf SC	4/5 stars
Maria Crisera; MF	(United States)	Manhattan Beach, California	Beach FC	3/5 stars
Ella Emri; DF	(United States)	San Diego, California	San Diego Surf SC	4/5 stars
Kaiya Jota; GK	(United States)	Pasadena, California	LA Breakers FC	3/5 stars
Eleanor Klinger; MF	(United States)	Cleveland, Ohio	Internationals SC (OH)	5/5 stars
Charlotte Kohler; FW	(United States)	Woodside, California	Mountain View Los Altos SC	4/5 stars
Sophie Murdock; DF	(United States)	Los Altos, California	Mountain View Los Altos SC	3/5 stars
Samantha Smith; MF	(United States)	Boise, Idaho	Boise Thorns	4/5 stars
Jaden Thomas; FW	(United States)	Dallas, Texas	FC Dallas (ECNL)	4/5 stars

== Squad ==
=== Roster ===
As of January 27, 2025

Note: Flags indicate national team as defined under FIFA eligibility rules; some limited exceptions apply. Players may hold more than one non-FIFA nationality.

No.	Pos.	Nation	Player
0	GK	USA	Alyssa Savig
2	DF	USA	Elise Evans
3	FW	USA	Allie Montoya
4	DF	USA	Freya Spiekerkoetter
5	MF	USA	Shae Harvey
6	DF	USA	Sophie Murdock
7	DF	USA	Lizzie Boamah
8	MF	USA	Mia Bhuta
9	FW	USA	Jaden Thomas
10	MF	USA	Charlotte Kohler
11	MF	USA	Eleanor Klinger
12	MF	USA	Jasmine Aikey
13	DF	USA	Sammy Smith
14	MF	USA	Mia Crisera
15	DF	USA	Ella Emri

No.	Pos.	Nation	Player
17	FW	USA	Erica Grilione
18	DF	USA	Avani Brandt
20	FW	USA	Andrea Kitahata
21	MF	USA	Joelle Jung
22	GK	USA	Kaiya Jota
23	DF	USA	Nya Harrison
24	FW	USA	Maryn Wolf
25	FW	USA	Samantha Williams
27	DF	USA	Kellie Pagador
28	DF	USA	Logan Smith
30	GK	USA	Haley Craig
31	FW	USA	Amalie Pianim
32	MF	USA	Aki Yuasa
33	FW	USA	Lumi Kostmayer

=== Team management ===
Position	Staff
Head coach	Paul Ratcliffe
Assistant Coach	Paul Hart
Assistant Coach	Daisy Sanchez
Assistant Coach	Brianna Visalli
Director of Operations	Mike Davis

== Schedule ==
Date Time, TV	Rank^{#}	Opponent^{#}	Result	Record	Site (Attendance) City, State
Exhibition
August 9*; 6:30 p.m.	No. 2	at San Jose State	None reported		Spartan Soccer Complex; San Jose, CA
Non-conference regular season
August 15*; 6:00 p.m., ESPN+	No. 2	at San Francisco	W 1–0	1–0–0	Negoesco Stadium (858); San Francisco, CA
August 18*; 1:00 p.m., ACCNX	No. 2	UC Irvine	W 3–0	2–0–0	Cagan Stadium (1,427); Stanford, CA
August 22*; 7:00 p.m., MW	No. 2	at San Diego State	W 3–1	3–0–0	SDSU Sports Deck (937); San Diego, CA
August 25*; 2:00 p.m., ESPN+	No. 2	at Cal State Fullerton	W 1–0	4–0–0	Titan Stadium (1,207); Fullerton, CA
September 1*; 1:00 p.m., ACCNX	No. 2	Washington State	W 2–0	5–0–0	Cagan Stadium (1,831); Stanford, CA
September 5*; 5:00 p.m., ESPN+	No. 1	at Saint Mary's	W 1–0	6–0–0	Saint Mary's Stadium (527); Moraga, CA
September 8*; 1:00 p.m., ACCNX	No. 1	USC	W 2–1	7–0–0	Cagan Stadium (1,887); Stanford, CA
September 15*; 1:00 p.m., ESPN+	No. 1	at No. 11 Santa Clara	W 1–0	8–0–0	Stevens Stadium (2,004); Santa Clara, CA
ACC Regular season
September 19; 4:00 p.m., ACCNX	No. 1	at No. 13 Wake Forest	L 0–1	8–1–0 (0–1–0)	Spry Stadium (1,229); Winston-Salem, NC
September 22; 10:00 a.m., ACCNX	No. 1	at NC State	W 2–0	9–1–0 (1–1–0)	Dail Soccer Field (786); Raleigh, NC
September 26; 7:00 p.m., ACCNX	No. 6	Miami (FL)	W 1–0	10–1–0 (2–1–0)	Cagan Stadium (1,767); Stanford, CA
September 29; 1:00 p.m., ACCNX	No. 6	Pittsburgh	T 1–1	10–1–1 (2–1–1)	Cagan Stadium (1,835); Stanford, CA
October 5; 5:00 p.m., ACCNX	No. 9	at SMU	W 2–1	11–1–1 (3–1–1)	Washburne Stadium (1,037); Dallas, TX
October 10; 7:00 p.m., ACCNX	No. 7	No. 1 Duke	L 1–4	11–2–1 (3–2–1)	Cagan Stadium (2,348); Stanford, CA
October 13; 1:00 p.m., ACCNX	No. 7	No. 2 North Carolina	W 1–0	12–2–1 (4–2–1)	Cagan Stadium (2,087); Stanford, CA
October 17; 4:00 p.m., ACCN	No. 6	at Louisville	W 1–0	13–2–1 (5–2–1)	Lynn Stadium (325); Louisville, KY
October 20; 11:00 a.m., ACCN	No. 6	at No. 12 Notre Dame	L 0–3	13–3–1 (5–3–1)	Alumni Stadium (901); Notre Dame, IN
October 31; 7:00 p.m., ACCNX	No. 14т	California	L 2–3	13–4–1 (5–4–1)	Cagan Stadium (1,561); Stanford, CA
NCAA tournament
November 15; 6:00 p.m., ESPN+	(3) No. 14т	UC Santa Barbara; First Round	W 5–0	14–4–1	Cagan Stadium (1,904); Stanford, CA
November 22; 1:00 p.m., ESPN+	(3) No. 14т	vs. UConn; Second Round	W 2–1	15–4–1	Razorback Field (1,516); Fayetteville, AR
November 24; 4:00 p.m., ESPN+	(3) No. 14т	at (2) No. 5 Arkansas; Round of 16	T 1–1 (4–2 PKs)	15–4–2	Razorback Field (2,214); Fayetteville, AR
November 29; 2:00 p.m., ESPN+	(3) No. 14т	(4) No. 13 Notre Dame; Quarterfinals	W 2–0	16–4–2	Cagan Stadium (2,042); Stanford, CA
December 6; 2:00 p.m., ESPNU	(3) No. 14т	(2) No. 3 Wake Forest; Semifinals	L 0–1	16–5–2	WakeMed Soccer Park (10,333); Cary, NC
*Non-conference game. ^{#}Rankings from United Soccer Coaches. (#) Tournament seedings in parentheses. All times are in Pacific.

== Awards and honors ==
Recipient	Award	Date	Ref.
Elise Evans	Pre-season All-ACC Team	August 8, 2024	
Jasmine Aikey	Pre-season All-ACC Team	August 8, 2024	
Elise Evans	Pre-season Hermann Trophy Watchlist	August 15, 2024	
Jasmine Aikey	Pre-season Hermann Trophy Watchlist	August 15, 2024	
Jasmine Aikey	ACC Co-Defensive Player of the Week – Week 5	September 17, 2024	
Jasmine Aikey	All-ACC Second Team	November 6, 2024	
Mia Bhuta	All-ACC Second Team	November 6, 2024	
Elise Evans	All-ACC Third Team	November 6, 2024	
Eleanor Klinger	ACC All-Freshman Team	November 6, 2024	

== Rankings ==
Ranking movements Legend: ██ Increase in ranking ██ Decrease in ranking т = Tied with team above or below ( ) = First-place votes
	Week																	
Poll	Pre	1	2	3	4	5	6	7	8	9	10	11	12	13	14	15	16	Final
United Soccer	2	2	2	1 (6)	1 (8)	1 (8)	6	9	7	6	12	14т	Not released					4
TopDrawer Soccer	2	2	2	1	1	1	6	7	5	5	9	11	15	15	15	7	4	4
