= 2024 Virginia Tech Hokies women's soccer team =

American college soccer season

2024 Virginia Tech Hokies women's soccer

NCAA Tournament, Quarterfinals
- Conference: Atlantic Coast Conference
- U. Soc. Coaches poll: No. 7
- TopDrawerSoccer.com: No. 8
- Record: 14–6–3 (6–2–2 ACC)
- Head coach: Charles Adair (14th season)
- Associate head coach: Drew Kopp (13th season)
- Assistant coach: Matt Gwilliam (10th season)
- Home stadium: Thompson Field

2024 ACC women's soccer standings
	Conf.						Overall
Team	W		L		T	PCT	W		L		T	PCT
No. 3 Duke ‍†‍‍^{y}	9	–	0	–	1	.950	18	–	3	–	1	.841
No. 2 Wake Forest ‍‍‍^{y}	7	–	2	–	1	.750	16	–	4	–	4	.750
No. 13 Florida State ‍‍‡‍^{y}	7	–	2	–	1	.750	15	–	2	–	4	.810
No. 1 North Carolina ‍‍‍^{y}	7	–	3	–	0	.700	22	–	5	–	0	.815
No. 7 Virginia Tech ‍‍‍^{y}	6	–	2	–	2	.700	14	–	6	–	3	.674
No. 6 Notre Dame ‍‍‍^{y}	5	–	1	–	4	.700	14	–	4	–	4	.727
California ‍‍‍^{y}	5	–	4	–	1	.550	13	–	6	–	2	.667
No. 4 Stanford ‍‍‍^{y}	5	–	4	–	1	.550	16	–	5	–	2	.739
Virginia ‍‍‍^{y}	5	–	5	–	0	.500	13	–	5	–	1	.711
Boston College ‍‍‍	4	–	4	–	2	.500	12	–	5	–	2	.684
Pittsburgh ‍‍‍	3	–	5	–	2	.400	9	–	6	–	3	.583
Louisville ‍‍‍	2	–	5	–	3	.350	7	–	6	–	5	.528
SMU ‍‍‍	2	–	6	–	2	.300	6	–	9	–	2	.412
Clemson ‍‍‍	2	–	7	–	1	.250	6	–	8	–	3	.441
Miami (FL) ‍‍‍	1	–	6	–	3	.250	5	–	8	–	4	.412
NC State ‍‍‍	1	–	6	–	3	.250	4	–	10	–	4	.333
Syracuse ‍‍‍	0	–	9	–	1	.050	6	–	10	–	2	.389
† – Conference champion ‡ – 2024 ACC Tournament champion y – Invited to the NCAA Tournament; As of December 10, 2024; Rankings from United Soccer Coaches Poll; Source: The ACC

The 2024 Virginia Tech Hokies women's soccer team represented Virginia Tech during the 2024 NCAA Division I women's soccer season. It was the 32nd season of the university fielding a program and 21st competing in the Atlantic Coast Conference. The Hokies were led by fourteenth year head coach Charles Adair and played their home games at Thompson Field in Blacksburg, Virginia.

The Hokies started the season with wins over Campbell and James Madison, which propelled them to a national ranking of a tie for twenty first. While ranked number twenty one, they defeated Delaware but drew Monmouth. They would fall out of the rankings after the draw, and then go on to win two more games. They re-entered the rankings at number twenty one after those wins, but lost their final two non-conference games, including their only game against a Power 4 opponent, Northwestern. They fell out of the rankings again to start ACC play. The defeated Clemson, and Syracuse to start the season. The Hokes would go 1–1–1 over their next three games before facing off against number six Florida State. They were able to pull off the upset 3–2 and returned to the rankings at number twenty one. After a defeat of SMU, they moved to nineteenth in the rankings. An upset victory over number seven Notre Dame, saw the Hokies ascend to number twelve in the rankings. They finished the ACC season with a loss to rival Virginia.

The Hokies finished 14–6–3 overall and 6–2–2 in ACC play to finish in fifth place. As the fifth seed in the ACC Tournament, they lost to the fourth seed North Carolina in the First Round. They received an at-large invitation to the NCAA Tournament. In the tournament they were selected as the seventh seed in the Duke bracket. They defeated Tennessee in the First Round which earned them a trip to Los Angeles. There they defeated second seed and ninth ranked UCLA in the Second Round, and third seed and seventeenth ranked Iowa in the Round of 16. They traveled back east to face first seed and number one ranked Duke in the Quarterfinals. The Hokies run ended there as they lost to Duke 1–0. The appearance was only the second Quarterfinal in program history. Their fourteen overall wins and six ACC wins were the best since 2015.

== Previous season ==
The Hokies finished 7–8–3 overall and 4–6–0 in ACC play to finish in eighth place. They did not qualify for the ACC Tournament and were not invited to the NCAA Tournament. Their seven wins were the lowest since 2017 and they finished with four conference wins for the fourth time in five seasons. The year broke a streak of two straight NCAA appearances.

== Offseason ==
=== Departures ===
Departures
Name	Number	Pos.	Height	Year	Hometown	Reason for departure
Alia Skinner	1	GK	5'9"	Senior	Fleming Island, Florida	Graduated; signed professional contract with Brommapojkarna
Riley McCarthy	2	DF	5'4"	Senior	Clifton, Virginia	Graduated
Ayden Yates	8	FW	5'6"	Senior	Davidson, North Carolina	Graduated
Ellie Farrell	11	MF	5'6"	Freshman	Wilmington, North Carolina	Transferred to James Madison
Victoria Haugen	20	DF	5'7"	Senior	Bristow, Virginia	Graduated
Averi Visage	21	DF/FW	5'10"	Senior	Acworth, Georgia	Graduated
Taylor Bryan	22	FW	5'5"	Senior	Brooklyn, New York	Graduated
Kate Bonshak	23	FW	5'4"	Senior	Whitehall, Pennsylvania	Graduated
Ava Veith	27	DF	5'9"	Senior	Williamsburg, Virginia	Graduated

=== Incoming transfers ===
Incoming transfers
Name	Number	Pos.	Height	Year	Hometown	Previous school
Mikki Easter	1	GK	5'9"	Graduate Student	Culpeper, Virginia	Marquette
Sarah Rosenbaum	37	FW	5'9"	Sophomore	Fredericksburg, Virginia	Wisconsin

=== Recruiting class ===
Name	Nationality	Hometown	Club	TDS Rating
Lauren Carpenter; DF	(United States)	Warrenton, Virginia	Virginia Development Academy	3/5 stars
Gabrielle Ciocca; MF	(United States)	Chapel Hill, North Carolina	North Carolina Courage (ECNL)	3/5 stars
Amelie D'Agnillo; DF	(United States)	Silver Spring, Maryland	Arlington SA	3/5 stars
Annie DeHaan; DF	(United States)	Carlsbad, California	San Diego Surf SC	4/5 stars
Kathryn Grannis; FW	(United States)	West Lake Hills, Texas	Austin Sting	3/5 stars
Taylor Lewin; FW	(United States)	Lawrenceville, Georgia	NHT Nasa	3/5 stars
Viviana Pope; FW	(United States)	Ashburn, Virginia	TSJ FC Virginia	4/5 stars
Ashleigh Vizek; DF	(United States)	Leesburg, Virginia	TSJ FC Virginia	4/5 stars

== Squad ==
=== Roster ===
As of January 31, 2025

Note: Flags indicate national team as defined under FIFA eligibility rules; some limited exceptions apply. Players may hold more than one non-FIFA nationality.

No.	Pos.	Nation	Player
00	GK	USA	Lauren Hargrove
0	GK	USA	Savannah Sabo
1	GK	USA	Mikki Easter
2	DF	USA	Annie DeHaan
3	FW	USA	Anna Weir
4	FW	USA	Emma Stanley
5	DF	FIN	Aino Vuorinen
6	DF	USA	Lauren Carpenter
7	MF	USA	Avery Tharrington
8	MF	USA	Emma Garrelts
9	MF	USA	Courtney Andersen
10	FW	USA	Viv Pope
11	DF	USA	Amelie D'Agnillo
12	DF	USA	Ashleigh Vizek
13	DF	USA	Victoria Moser
14	DF	USA	Allie Lewis
16	FW	USA	Allie George
17	MF	USA	Ella Bjorklund

No.	Pos.	Nation	Player
18	MF	USA	Lauren Gogal
19	FW	USA	Samantha DeGuzman
20	DF	USA	Kylie Marschall
21	FF	USA	Taylor Lewin
22	FW	USA	Sophie Maltese
23	FW	USA	Kate Grannis
24	FW	USA	Natalie Mitchell
25	FW	USA	Taylor Price
26	MF	USA	Emma Pelkowski
27	MF	USA	Gabby Ciocca
28	MF	ENG	Eden Skyers
29	MF	USA	Kendall DiMillio
30	GK	USA	Mallory Mizelle
31	DF	USA	Maysen Nelson
33	MF	USA	Ava Arengo
34	FW	USA	Ella Valente
37	FW	USA	Sarah Rosenbaum

== Team management ==
Position	Staff
Head coach	Charles Adair
Associate Head Coach	Drew Kopp
Assistant Coach	Matt Gwilliam
Director of Operations	Katie Flores

== Schedule ==
Date Time, TV	Rank^{#}	Opponent^{#}	Result	Record	Site (Attendance) City, State
Exhibition
August 5*; 3:00 p.m.		VCU	None Reported	—	Thompson Field; Blacksburg, VA
August 9*; 6:00 p.m.		East Tennessee State	None Reported	—	Thompson Field; Blacksburg, VA
Non-conference regular season
August 15*; 6:00 p.m., ACCNX		Campbell	W 4–0	1–0–0	Thompson Field (858); Blacksburg, VA
August 18*; 7:00 p.m., ESPN+		at James Madison	W 2–0	2–0–0	Sentara Park (787); Harrisonburg, VA
August 22*; 7:00 p.m., FloFC	No. 21т	at Delaware	W 1–0	3–0–0	Grant Stadium (383); Newark, DE
August 25*; 1:00 p.m., FloFC	No. 21т	at Monmouth	T 1–1	3–0–1	Hesse Field (817); West Long Branch, NJ
August 29*; 7:00 p.m., ACCNX		Loyola (MD)	W 1–0	4–0–1	Thompson Field; Blacksburg, VA
September 1*; 5:00 p.m., ACCNX		High Point	W 2–0	5–0–1	Thompson Field (643); Blacksburg, VA
September 5*; 7:30 p.m., ACCNX	No. 21	Liberty	L 1–2	5–1–1	Thompson Field (638); Blacksburg, VA
September 8*; 2:00 p.m., BTN+	No. 21	at Northwestern	L 0–1	5–2–1	Martin Stadium (451); Evanston, IL
ACC regular season
September 12; 7:00 p.m., ACCNX		at Clemson	W 2–1	6–2–1 (1–0–0)	Riggs Field (526); Clemson, SC
September 15; 12:00 p.m., ACCN		Syracuse	W 2–1	7–2–1 (2–0–0)	Thompson Field (733); Blacksburg, VA
September 22; 1:00 p.m., ACCNX		at Boston College	L 1–3	7–3–1 (2–1–0)	Newton Campus Soccer Field (425); Chestnut Hill, MA
September 26; 7:00 p.m., ACCN		Louisville	W 5–1	8–3–1 (3–1–0)	Thompson Field (273); Blacksburg, VA
October 3; 8:00 p.m., ACCN		at Miami (FL)	T 0–0	8–3–2 (3–1–1)	Cobb Stadium (315); Coral Gables, FL
October 6; 1:00 p.m., ACCNX		No. 6 Florida State	W 3–2	9–3–2 (4–1–1)	Thompson Field (1,056); Blacksburg, VA
October 10; 7:00 p.m., ACCNX	No. 21	SMU	W 1–0	10–3–2 (5–1–1)	Thompson Field (840); Blacksburg, VA
October 24; 7:00 p.m., ACCN	No. 19	at NC State	T 0–0	10–3–3 (5–1–2)	Dail Soccer Field (667); Raleigh, NC
October 27; 1:00 p.m., ACCNX	No. 19	at No. 7 Notre Dame	W 2–0	11–3–3 (6–1–2)	Alumni Stadium (394); Notre Dame, IN
October 31; 8:00 p.m., ACCN	No. 12	Virginia; Rivalry	L 0–1	11–4–3 (6–2–2)	Thompson Field (1,056); Blacksburg, VA
ACC tournament
November 3; 6:00 p.m., ACCN	(5) No. 12	at (4) No. 8 North Carolina; First Round	L 0–2	11–5–3	Dorrance Field (1,347); Chapel Hill, NC
NCAA tournament
November 15; 7:00 p.m., ESPN+	(7) No. 12	Tennessee; First Round	W 2–1	12–5–3	Thompson Field (1,200); Blacksburg, VA
November 22; 10:00 p.m., ESPN+	(7) No. 12	at (2) No. 9 UCLA; Second Round	W 2–1	13–5–3	Wallis Annenberg Stadium (1,418); Los Angeles, CA
November 24; 9:00 p.m., ESPN+	(7) No. 12	vs. (3) No. 17т Iowa; Round of 16	W 1–0	14–5–3	Wallis Annenberg Stadium (467); Los Angeles, CA
November 30; 6:00 p.m., ESPN+	(7) No. 12	at (1) No. 1 Duke; Quarterfinals	L 0–1	14–6–3	Koskinen Stadium (1,581); Durham, NC
*Non-conference game. ^{#}Rankings from United Soccer Coaches. (#) Tournament seedings in parentheses. All times are in Eastern.

== Awards and honors ==
Recipient	Award	Date	Ref.
Allie George	ACC Defensive Player of the Week – Week 3	September 3, 2024	
Lauren Hargrove	ACC Co-Defensive Player of the Week – Week 5	September 17, 2024	
Lauren Hargrove	ACC Co-Defensive Player of the Week – Week 11	October 26, 2024	

== Rankings ==
Ranking movements Legend: ██ Increase in ranking ██ Decrease in ranking — = Not ranked RV = Received votes т = Tied with team above or below
	Week																	
Poll	Pre	1	2	3	4	5	6	7	8	9	10	11	12	13	14	15	16	Final
United Soccer	—	21т	RV	21	—	RV	—	—	21	18	19	12	Not released					7
TopDrawer Soccer	—	—	—	—	—	—	—	—	—	—	—	20	24	24	22	8	8	8
