= 2024 Wake Forest Demon Deacons women's soccer team =

American college soccer season

2024 Wake Forest Demon Deacons women's soccer

NCAA Tournament, Runner-Up
- Conference: Atlantic Coast Conference
- U. Soc. Coaches poll: No. 2
- TopDrawerSoccer.com: No. 2
- Record: 16–4–4 (7–2–1 ACC)
- Head coach: Tony da Luz (28th season)
- Associate head coach: Brittany Cameron (5th season)
- Assistant coaches: Courtney Drummond (3rd season); Taylor Culp (1st season)
- Home stadium: Spry Stadium

2024 ACC women's soccer standings
	Conf.						Overall
Team	W		L		T	PCT	W		L		T	PCT
No. 3 Duke ‍†‍‍^{y}	9	–	0	–	1	.950	18	–	3	–	1	.841
No. 2 Wake Forest ‍‍‍^{y}	7	–	2	–	1	.750	16	–	4	–	4	.750
No. 13 Florida State ‍‍‡‍^{y}	7	–	2	–	1	.750	15	–	2	–	4	.810
No. 1 North Carolina ‍‍‍^{y}	7	–	3	–	0	.700	22	–	5	–	0	.815
No. 7 Virginia Tech ‍‍‍^{y}	6	–	2	–	2	.700	14	–	6	–	3	.674
No. 6 Notre Dame ‍‍‍^{y}	5	–	1	–	4	.700	14	–	4	–	4	.727
California ‍‍‍^{y}	5	–	4	–	1	.550	13	–	6	–	2	.667
No. 4 Stanford ‍‍‍^{y}	5	–	4	–	1	.550	16	–	5	–	2	.739
Virginia ‍‍‍^{y}	5	–	5	–	0	.500	13	–	5	–	1	.711
Boston College ‍‍‍	4	–	4	–	2	.500	12	–	5	–	2	.684
Pittsburgh ‍‍‍	3	–	5	–	2	.400	9	–	6	–	3	.583
Louisville ‍‍‍	2	–	5	–	3	.350	7	–	6	–	5	.528
SMU ‍‍‍	2	–	6	–	2	.300	6	–	9	–	2	.412
Clemson ‍‍‍	2	–	7	–	1	.250	6	–	8	–	3	.441
Miami (FL) ‍‍‍	1	–	6	–	3	.250	5	–	8	–	4	.412
NC State ‍‍‍	1	–	6	–	3	.250	4	–	10	–	4	.333
Syracuse ‍‍‍	0	–	9	–	1	.050	6	–	10	–	2	.389
† – Conference champion ‡ – 2024 ACC Tournament champion y – Invited to the NCAA Tournament; As of December 10, 2024; Rankings from United Soccer Coaches Poll; Source: The ACC

The 2024 Wake Forest Demon Deacons women's soccer team represented Wake Forest University during the 2024 NCAA Division I women's soccer season. The Demon Deacons were led by head coach Tony da Luz, in his twenty-eighth season. They played their home games at Spry Stadium in Winston-Salem, North Carolina. This was the team's 30th season playing organized women's college soccer, all of which have been played in the Atlantic Coast Conference.

The Demon Deacons started the season unranked and went 3–0–1 in their first four non conference games. They played two Power 4 opponents over this span, and drew at Rutgers and defeated twentieth ranked Mississippi State at home. The win over Mississippi State saw them rise to eighteenth in the rankings. However, they lost to Iowa and fell out of the rankings. They defeated two non-Power 4 schools to finish the non-conference regular season 5–1–1. They opened ACC play with a loss to tenth ranked North Carolina. However, they followed that with an upset of second ranked Virginia which saw them re-enter the rankings at number thirteen. In their next match they defeated first ranked Stanford. After drawing with California they rose to number five in the rankings. A defeat of Syracuse saw them rise to number four before their match-up with Florida State, which the Demon Deacons would in emphatically 4–1. The win saw them rise to number two. Their only loss as the second ranked team in the nation came against first ranked Duke.

The Demon Deacons finished the regular season 12–3–2 overall and 7–2–1 in ACC ACC play to finish in a tie for second place. As the third seed in the ACC Tournament they earned a bye to the Semifinals where they met third seed and sixth ranked Florida State. The game was closer than it was in the regular season and Florida State prevailed in a penalty shoot-out. They received an at-large invitation to the NCAA Tournament. They were selected as the second seed in the Southern California Bracket. They defeated Morehead State in the First Round, Colorado in the Second Round, and third-seed and tenth ranked Ohio State in the Round of 16. They traveled to Southern California to face the first seed and fourth ranked Trojans in the Quarterfinals. Wake Forest prevailed in a penalty shoot-out to advance to the Semifinals. There they faced regular season opponent Stanford, and again won 1–0. They faced another regular season foe in the Final, North Carolina. The Demon Deacons again could not defeat the Tar Heels and finished as runners-up. Their final record was 16–4–4.

== Previous season ==
The Demon Deacons finished the season 10–2–5 overall and 4–2–4 in ACC ACC play to finish in sixth place. They qualified for the ACC Tournament as the sixth seed, and lost in the First Round to Clemson. They were not invited to the NCAA Tournament.

== Offseason ==
=== Departures ===
Departures
Name	Number	Pos.	Height	Year	Hometown	Reason for departure
Madison Howard	00	GK	5'8"	Senior	Greensboro, North Carolina	Graduated; transferred to Northwestern
Reese Kim	2	MF	5'5"	(redshirt) Junior	Manhattan Beach, California	Graduated
Kristi Vierra	8	MF	5'7"	Senior	Norwell, Massachusetts	Graduated
Liv Stowell	11	FW	5'4"	Senior	Londonderry, New Hampshire	Graduated
Carrie McIntire	14	FW	5'9"	Senior	Haymarket, Virginia	Graduated; transferred to Johns Hopkins
Baylor Goldthwaite	21	MF	5'5"	Sophomore	Durham, North Carolina	Transferred to Boston College
Sasha Schwartz	22	DF	5'6"	Senior	New York City, New York	Graduated

=== Incoming transfers ===
Incoming transfers
Name	Number	Pos.	Height	Year	Hometown	Previous school
Paige Nurkin	0	GK	6'0"	Graduate Student	Charlotte, North Carolina	Columbia
Emily Colton	3	MF	5'3"	Senior	Carlsbad, California	North Carolina

=== Recruiting class ===
Name	Nationality	Hometown	Club	TDS Rating
Chloe Burst; FW	(United States)	New Orleans, Louisiana	Challenge SC	4/5 stars
Amaya Dawkins; MF	(United States)	Wylie, Texas	FC Dallas (ECNL)	4/5 stars
Josephine Noble; FW	(United States)	Wilmette, Illinois	Eclipse Select (IL)	3/5 stars
Miri O'Donnell; FW	(United States)	San Ramon, California	Mountain View Los Altos SC	4/5 stars
Lola Ressler; MF	(United States)	Winter Garden, Florida	Orlando City SC (ECNL)	3/5 stars
Tahlia Zadeyan; DF	(United States)	La Jolla, California	Del Mar Carmel Valley Sharks	3/5 stars
Mariner Headrick; FW	(United States)	Madrid, Spain	Atlético Madrid	3/5 stars

== Squad ==
=== Roster ===
As of February 7, 2025

Note: Flags indicate national team as defined under FIFA eligibility rules; some limited exceptions apply. Players may hold more than one non-FIFA nationality.

No.	Pos.	Nation	Player
0	GK	USA	Paige Nurkin
1	GK	USA	Valentina Amaral
2	MF	USA	Amaya Dawkins
3	MF	USA	Emily Colton
4	MF	CAN	Nikayla Small
5	DF	USA	MJ Osborne
6	MF	USA	Dempsey Brown
7	DF	ISL	Kristin Johnson
8	FW	USA	Chloe Burst
9	MF	USA	Caiya Hanks
10	MF	ENG	Malaika Meena
13	MF	USA	Emily Morris
14	MF	USA	Lola Ressler
15	DF	USA	Sammi Wiemann
16	FW	USA	Alex Wood
17	DF	USA	Tyla Ochoa
18	DF	USA	Kate Dobsch
19	FW	USA	Sierra Sythe

No.	Pos.	Nation	Player
20	FW	USA	Hannah Johnson
22	MF	USA	Josie Nobel
23	DF	USA	Allie Schmidt
24	DF	USA	Zara Chavoshi
25	MF	USA	Sophie Faircloth
26	DF	USA	Taryn Chance
27	DF	USA	Nadia DeMarinis
28	MF	USA	Carly Wilson
29	DF	USA	Olivia DeMarinis
30	MF	USA	Anna Swanson
31	MF	USA	Olivia Duvall
32	MF	USA	Emily Silva
33	DF	USA	Abbie Colton
34	DF	USA	Laurel Ansbrow
35	FW	IRL	Emily Murphy
39	DF	USA	Laine DeNatale
88	GK	USA	Peyton Cahill

=== Team management ===
Position	Staff
Head coach	Tony da Luz
Associate Head Coach	Brittany Cameron
Assistant Coach	Courtney Drummond
Assistant Coach	Taylor Culp

== Schedule ==
Date Time, TV	Rank^{#}	Opponent^{#}	Result	Record	Site City, State
Exhibition
August 7*; 7:00 p.m.		James Madison	None Reported	—	Spry Stadium; Winston-Salem, NC
August 10*; 7:00 p.m.		at No. 21 South Carolina	None Reported	—	Stone Stadium; Columbia, SC
Non-conference regular season
August 15*; 6:00 p.m., ESPN+		at Army	W 1–0	1–0–0	Clinton Field (300); West Point, NY
August 18*; 1:00 p.m., BTN+		at Rutgers	T 1–1	1–0–1	Yurcak Field (906); Piscataway, NJ
August 22*; 6:00 p.m., ACCNX		Temple	W 4–0	2–0–1	Spry Stadium (2,237); Winston-Salem, NC
August 25*; 2:00 p.m., ACCN		No. 20 Mississippi State	W 2–1	3–0–1	Spry Stadium (933); Winston-Salem, NC
August 29*; 5:00 p.m., ESPN+	No. 18	at Richmond	Cancelled	3–0–1	President's Field; Richmond, VA
September 1*; 6:00 p.m., BTN+	No. 18	at Iowa	L 0–2	3–1–1	UI Soccer Complex (1,563); Iowa City, IA
September 5*; 4:00 p.m., FloFC		at Villanova	W 1–0	4–1–1	Higgins Soccer Complex (397); Villanova, PA
September 8*; 2:00 p.m., ACCNX		UNC Asheville	W 5–0	5–1–1	Spry Stadium (758); Winston-Salem, NC
ACC regular season
September 12; 7:00 p.m., ACCNX		at No. 10 North Carolina	L 0–1	5–2–1 (0–1–0)	Dorrance Field (2,942); Chapel Hill, NC
September 15; 12:00 p.m., ACCN		at No. 2 Virginia	W 3–0	6–2–1 (1–1–0)	Klöckner Stadium (1,402); Charlottesville, VA
September 19; 7:00 p.m., ACCNX	No. 13	No. 1 Stanford	W 1–0	7–2–1 (2–1–0)	Spry Stadium (1,229); Winston-Salem, NC
September 22; 12:00 p.m., ACCN	No. 13	California	T 2–2	7–2–2 (2–1–1)	Spry Stadium (855); Winston-Salem, NC
September 29; 1:00 p.m., ACCNX	No. 5	at Syracuse	W 3–0	8–2–2 (3–1–1)	SU Soccer Stadium (944); Syracuse, NY
October 3; 7:00 p.m., ACCNX	No. 4	No. 6 Florida State	W 4–1	9–2–2 (4–1–1)	Spry Stadium (1,621); Winston-Salem, NC
October 19; 7:00 p.m., ACCNX	No. 2	at SMU	W 2–1	10–2–2 (5–1–1)	Washburne Stadium (933); Dallas, TX
October 24; 7:00 p.m., ACCNX	No. 2	at Pittsburgh	W 2–0	11–2–2 (6–1–1)	Ambrose Urbanic Field (759); Pittsburgh, PA
October 27; 6:00 p.m., ACCN	No. 2	No. 1 Duke	L 0–2	11–3–2 (6–2–1)	Spry Stadium (3,761); Winston-Salem, NC
October 31; 7:00 p.m., ACCNX	No. 3	NC State	W 3–0	12–3–2 (7–2–1)	Spry Stadium (894); Winston-Salem, NC
ACC tournament
November 7; 5:30 p.m., ACCN	(2) No. 3	vs. (3) No. 6 Florida State; Semifinals	T 1–1 (1–3 PKs)	12–3–3	WakeMed Soccer Park (1,065); Cary, NC
NCAA tournament
November 15; 6:00 p.m., ESPN+	(2) No. 3	Morehead State; First Round	W 4–0	13–3–3	Spry Stadium (601); Winston-Salem, NC
November 22; 6:00 p.m., ESPN+	(2) No. 3	Colorado; Second Round	W 3–1	14–3–3	Spry Stadium (612); Winston-Salem, NC
November 24; 2:00 p.m., ESPN+	(2) No. 3	(3) No. 10 Ohio State; Round of 16	W 1–0	15–3–3	Spry Stadium (870); Winston-Salem, NC
November 29; 5:00 p.m., ESPN+	(2) No. 3	at (1) No. 4 USC; Quarterfinals	T 2–2 (4–3 PKs) ^{2OT}	15–3–4	Dignity Health Sports Park (1,208); Carson, CA
December 6; 5:00 p.m., ESPNU	(2) No. 3	vs. (3) No. 14т Stanford; Semifinals	W 1–0	16–3–4	WakeMed Soccer Park (10,333); Cary, NC
December 9; 7:00 p.m., ESPNU	(2) No. 3	(2) No. 8 North Carolina; Final	L 0–1	16–4–4	WakeMed Soccer Park (9,475); Cary, NC
*Non-conference game. ^{#}Rankings from United Soccer Coaches. (#) Tournament seedings in parentheses.

== Awards and honors ==
Recipient	Award	Date	Ref.
Caiya Hanks	ACC Offensive Player of the Week – Week 5	September 17	
Emily Colton	ACC Offensive Player of the Week – Week 6	September 24	
Emily Murphy	ACC Co-Offensive Player of the Week – Week 8	October 7, 2024	
Caiya Hanks	All-ACC First Team	November 6, 2024	
Zara Chavoshi	All-ACC Second Team	November 6, 2024	
Emily Colton	All-ACC Second Team	November 6, 2024	
Emily Murphy	All-ACC Second Team	November 6, 2024	
Valentina Amaral	All-ACC Third Team	November 6, 2024	
Emily Morris	All-ACC Tournament Team	November 10, 2024	

== Rankings ==
Ranking movements Legend: ██ Increase in ranking ██ Decrease in ranking — = Not ranked RV = Received votes
	Week																	
Poll	Pre	1	2	3	4	5	6	7	8	9	10	11	12	13	14	15	16	Final
United Soccer	RV	RV	18	RV	RV	13	5	4	3	2	2	3	Not released					2
TopDrawer Soccer	—	—	20	20	22	15	4	3	2	2	2	3	3	3	3	1	1	2
