= 2024 Pittsburgh Panthers women's soccer team =

American college soccer season

2024 Pittsburgh Panthers women's soccer
- Conference: Atlantic Coast Conference
- Record: 9–6–3 (3–5–2 ACC)
- Head coach: Randy Waldrum (7th season)
- Associate head coach: Ben Waldrum (7th season)
- Assistant coaches: Jesse Goleman (2nd season); Ashton Gordon (1st season)
- Home stadium: Ambrose Urbanic Field

2024 ACC women's soccer standings
	Conf.						Overall
Team	W		L		T	PCT	W		L		T	PCT
No. 3 Duke ‍†‍‍^{y}	9	–	0	–	1	.950	18	–	3	–	1	.841
No. 2 Wake Forest ‍‍‍^{y}	7	–	2	–	1	.750	16	–	4	–	4	.750
No. 13 Florida State ‍‍‡‍^{y}	7	–	2	–	1	.750	15	–	2	–	4	.810
No. 1 North Carolina ‍‍‍^{y}	7	–	3	–	0	.700	22	–	5	–	0	.815
No. 7 Virginia Tech ‍‍‍^{y}	6	–	2	–	2	.700	14	–	6	–	3	.674
No. 6 Notre Dame ‍‍‍^{y}	5	–	1	–	4	.700	14	–	4	–	4	.727
California ‍‍‍^{y}	5	–	4	–	1	.550	13	–	6	–	2	.667
No. 4 Stanford ‍‍‍^{y}	5	–	4	–	1	.550	16	–	5	–	2	.739
Virginia ‍‍‍^{y}	5	–	5	–	0	.500	13	–	5	–	1	.711
Boston College ‍‍‍	4	–	4	–	2	.500	12	–	5	–	2	.684
Pittsburgh ‍‍‍	3	–	5	–	2	.400	9	–	6	–	3	.583
Louisville ‍‍‍	2	–	5	–	3	.350	7	–	6	–	5	.528
SMU ‍‍‍	2	–	6	–	2	.300	6	–	9	–	2	.412
Clemson ‍‍‍	2	–	7	–	1	.250	6	–	8	–	3	.441
Miami (FL) ‍‍‍	1	–	6	–	3	.250	5	–	8	–	4	.412
NC State ‍‍‍	1	–	6	–	3	.250	4	–	10	–	4	.333
Syracuse ‍‍‍	0	–	9	–	1	.050	6	–	10	–	2	.389
† – Conference champion ‡ – 2024 ACC Tournament champion y – Invited to the NCAA Tournament; As of December 10, 2024; Rankings from United Soccer Coaches Poll; Source: The ACC

The 2024 Pittsburgh Panthers women's soccer team represented the University of Pittsburgh during the 2024 NCAA Division I women's soccer season. The Panthers were led by head coach Randy Waldrum, in his seventh season. They played their home games at Ambrose Urbanic Field. This was the team's 29th season playing organized women's college soccer and their 12th playing in the Atlantic Coast Conference.

The Panthers started the season ranked seventh overall, and faced off against fourteenth ranked Georgia. The match ended in a 0–0 draw. Pittsburgh won its next match before being upset by unranked Buffalo. Despite another win, the Panthers fell out of the rankings with the next release. They won their remaining four non-conference games to finish 6–1–1. Georgia was the only Power 4 opponent they faced in non-conference play. They began ACC play with a win over Louisville before losing 0–1 to both eighth ranked North Carolina and California. They followed those results with a tie against Stanford before defeating Clemson and Syracuse. They tied Miami before facing three ranked teams in their final three games. The Panthers would go on to lose all of those matches, with the closest being 2–3 in the final game of the season against thirteenth ranked Notre Dame.

The Panthers finished the season 9–6–3 overall and 3–5–2 in ACC play to finish in eleventh place. The team did not qualify for the ACC Tournament and were not invited to the NCAA Tournament. This season broke a streak of two consecutive qualifications for both of those tournaments. Their nine total wins were the lowest since 2019. Their three conference wins were the lowest since a pandemic shortented 2020 season.

== Previous season ==
The Panthers finished the season 17–6–1 overall and 6–3–1 in ACC play to finish in fifth place. As the fifth seed in the ACC Tournament they upset nationally third ranked North Carolina in overtime in the Quarterfinals. They could not advance further than the semifinals as they were defeated by Florida State. They received an at-large bid to the NCAA Tournament. As the seventh-seed in the Florida State Bracket, they defeated Ohio State 6–0 in the First Round and, second-seed Arkansas in the Second Round and sixth seed Memphis in the Round of 16. The victory against Memphis set up a third matchup with Florida State this season. The score in this matchup was the most lopsided of the three matches and the Panthers lost 3–0 to end their season.

== Offseason ==
=== Departures ===
Departures
Name	Number	Pos.	Height	Year	Hometown	Reason for departure
Lainie Fuchs	3	DF	5'7"	Freshman	Vienna, Austria	Returned to Austria to play professionally
Landy Mertz	6	MF	5'4"	Senior	Pittsburgh, Pennsylvania	Graduated; drafted 52nd overall in the 2024 NWSL Draft
Fleming Dean	7	MF	5'5"	Sophomore	Marietta, Georgia	Transferred to Stanford
Amanda West	9	FW	5'6"	Graduate Student	Sundsvall, Sweden	Graduated; drafted 36th overall in the 2024 NWSL Draft
Anna Bout	12	MF	5'5"	Graduate Student	Cambridge, Canada	Graduated
Evie Craven	14	FW	5'6"	Freshman	Stockport, England	Transferred to Charlotte
Delaney Evers	22	FW	5'7"	Freshman	Oakdale, Pennsylvania	Transferred to Charleston Southern
Emily Edwards	25	GK	5'9"	Freshman	Holly Springs, North Carolina	Transferred to Purdue
Kaley Simqu	28	DF	5'3"	Freshman	Pittsburgh, Pennsylvania	Transferred to Bowling Green
Ashton Gordon	32	DF	5'11"	Graduate Student	Tulsa, Oklahoma	Graduated

=== Incoming transfers ===
Incoming transfers
Name	Number	Pos.	Height	Year	Hometown	Previous school
Abby Reisz	1	GK	5'9"	(redshirt) Sophomore	Upper Arlington, Ohio	Tennessee
Magali Gagne	3	MF	5'6"	(redshirt) Junior	Montreal, Canada	Kansas
Grace Pettet	19	DF	5'8"	Graduate Student	Tulsa, Oklahoma	Missouri
Bailey Wagenknecht	22	FW	5'6"	(redshirt) Sophomore	Peachtree City, Georgia	Mississippi State
Ava Boyd	26	FW	5'7"	Sophomore	Pittsburgh, Pennsylvania	Michigan State

=== Recruiting class ===
Name	Nationality	Hometown	Club	TDS Rating
Lola Abraham; FW	(United States)	Oakmont, Pennsylvania	Pittsburgh Riverhounds	3/5 stars
Chloe Brecht; FW	(United States)	Powell, Ohio	Ohio Premier	3/5 stars
Coco Dorfman; DF	(United States)	San Diego, California	San Diego Surf	3/5 stars
Emily Graeca; DF	(United States)	Dubois, Pennsylvania	Pittsburgh Hotspurs	N/A
Bella Haynes; DF	(United States)	Canton, Michigan	Michigan Hawks	3/5 stars
Rylee Keeley; FW	(United States)	Wake Forest, North Carolina	North Carolina Courage (ECNL)	3/5 stars
Erika Schneider; DF	(United States)	Aldie, Virginia	TSJ FC Virginia	4/5 stars
Dakota Watterson; MF	(United States)	Clovis, California	Clovis Crossfire SC	3/5 stars

== Squad ==
=== Roster ===
As of December 30, 2024

Note: Flags indicate national team as defined under FIFA eligibility rules; some limited exceptions apply. Players may hold more than one non-FIFA nationality.

No.	Pos.	Nation	Player
0	GK	USA	Ellie Breech
1	GK	USA	Abigail Reisz
2	DF	USA	Haylee Mersereau
3	MF	CAN	Magali Gagne
4	MF	USA	Ellie Coffield
5	FW	USA	Sarah Schupansky
6	MF	USA	Briana Rodriguez
7	FW	CAN	Sofia Doheny
8	MF	NGA	Deborah Abiodun
9	FW	USA	Lucia Wells
10	MF	CAN	Keera Melenhorst
11	DF	USA	Mackenzie Evers
12	DF	USA	Sage Stelzer
13	DF	USA	Ashley Moon
14	DF	USA	Olivia Lee
15	MF	CAN	Chloe Minas
16	FW	USA	Margaret Wilde
17	FW	USA	Aliya Gomes
18	FW	USA	Paige Dzeidzic

No.	Pos.	Nation	Player
19	DF	USA	Grace Pettet
20	MF	NGA	Celine Ottah
21	DF	USA	Katie Zailski
22	FW	USA	Bailey Wagenknecht
23	FW	USA	Samiah Phiri
24	MF	USA	Emma Rhoades
25	DF	USA	Coco Dorfman
26	FW	USA	Ava Boyd
27	FW	USA	Dakota Watterson
28	FW	USA	Chloe Brecht
29	MF	USA	Olivia Duray
30	FW	USA	Kaitlyn Killinger
31	FW	USA	Emily Cooper
32	DF	USA	Erika Schneider
33	GK	USA	Emma Van Meter
34	MF	USA	Rylee Keely
35	DF	USA	Emily Graeca
86	FW	USA	Lola Abraham
—	DF	USA	Bella Haynes

=== Team management ===
Position	Staff
Head coach	Randy Waldrum
Associate Head Coach	Ben Waldrum
Assistant Coach	Jesse Goleman
Assistant Coach	Ashton Gordon

== Schedule ==
Date Time, TV	Rank^{#}	Opponent^{#}	Result	Record	Site (Attendance) City, State
Exhibition
August 4*; 7:30 p.m.	No. 7	at West Virginia	None Reported	—	Dick Dlesk Soccer Stadium; Morgantown, WV
August 10*; 5:00 p.m.	No. 7	Michigan	None Reported	—	Ambrose Urbanic Field; Pittsburgh, PA
Non-conference regular season
August 15*; 6:30 p.m., SECN+	No. 7	at No. 14 Georgia	T 0–0	0–0–1	Turner Soccer Complex (1,793); Athens, GA
August 18*; 3:00 p.m.	No. 7	vs. Duquesne	W 2–1	1–0–1	Highmark Stadium (1,250); Pittsburgh, PA
August 22*; 5:00 p.m., ACCNX	No. 7	Buffalo	L 1–2	1–1–1	Ambrose Urbanic Field (528); Pittsburgh, PA
August 25*; 1:00 p.m., ESPN+	No. 7	at Bucknell	W 5–1	2–1–1	Emmitt Field (825); Lewisburg, PA
August 29*; 4:00 p.m., ESPN+		at Loyola Marymount	W 3–0	3–1–1	Sullivan Field (136); Los Angeles, CA
September 1*; 5:00 p.m., ESPN+		at Cal State Fullerton	W 2–0	4–1–1	Titan Stadium (336); Fullerton, CA
September 5*; 7:00 p.m., ACCNX		Dartmouth	W 6–1	5–1–1	Ambrose Urbanic Field (480); Pittsburgh, PA
September 8*; 1:00 p.m., ACCNX		Mercyhurst	W 7–0	6–1–1	Ambrose Urbanic Field (780); Pittsburgh, PA
ACC Regular season
September 14; 7:00 p.m., ACCNX		Louisville	W 3–1	7–1–1 (1–0–0)	Ambrose Urbanic Field (888); Pittsburgh, PA
September 19; 7:00 p.m., ACCNX		No. 8 North Carolina	L 0–1	7–2–1 (1–1–0)	Ambrose Urbanic Field (1,490); Pittsburgh, PA
September 26; 7:00 p.m., ACCNX		at California	L 0–1	7–3–1 (1–2–0)	Edwards Stadium (212); Berkeley, CA
September 29; 4:00 p.m., ACCNX		at No. 6 Stanford	T 1–1	7–3–2 (1–2–1)	Cagan Stadium (1,835); Stanford, CA
October 3; 6:00 p.m., ACCN		Clemson	W 4–1	8–3–2 (2–2–1)	Ambrose Urbanic Field (596); Pittsburgh, PA
October 13; 1:30 p.m., ACCN		Syracuse	W 3–0	9–3–2 (3–2–1)	Ambrose Urbanic Field (824); Pittsburgh, PA
October 17; 7:00 p.m., ACCNX		at Miami	T 0–0	9–3–3 (3–2–2)	Cobb Stadium (712); Coral Gables, FL
October 20; 1:00 p.m., ACCNX		at No. 22 Florida State	L 1–7	9–4–3 (3–3–2)	Seminole Soccer Complex (854); Tallahassee, FL
October 24; 7:00 p.m., ACCNX		No. 2 Wake Forest	L 0–2	9–5–3 (3–4–2)	Ambrose Urbanic Field (759); Pittsburgh, PA
October 31; 7:00 p.m., ACCNX		at No. 13 Notre Dame	L 2–3	9–6–3 (3–5–2)	Alumni Stadium (277); Notre Dame, IN
*Non-conference game. ^{#}Rankings from United Soccer Coaches. (#) Tournament seedings in parentheses. All times are in Eastern.

== Awards and honors ==
Recipient	Award	Date	Ref.
Deborah Abiodun	Pre-season All-ACC Team	August 8, 2024	
Sarah Schupansky	Pre-season All-ACC Team	August 8, 2024	
Deborah Abiodun	All-ACC Second Team	November 6, 2024	
Sarah Schupansky	All-ACC Second Team	November 6, 2024	

== Rankings ==
Ranking movements Legend: ██ Increase in ranking ██ Decrease in ranking — = Not ranked RV = Received votes
	Week																	
Poll	Pre	1	2	3	4	5	6	7	8	9	10	11	12	13	14	15	16	Final
United Soccer	7	7	—	—	—	—	—	RV	RV	RV	—	—	Not released					—
TopDrawer Soccer	3	6	19	16	16	13	16	15	13	8	—	—	—	—	—	—	—	—
