= 2024 North Carolina Tar Heels women's soccer team =

American college soccer season

2024 North Carolina Tar Heels women's soccer

National Champions

NCAA Tournament, College Cup
- Conference: Atlantic Coast Conference
- U. Soc. Coaches poll: No. 1
- TopDrawerSoccer.com: No. 1
- Record: 22–5–0 (7–3–0 ACC)
- Head coach: Damon Nahas (9th season)
- Assistant coaches: Chris Ducar (29th season); Tracey Leone (1st season)
- Home stadium: Dorrance Field

2024 ACC women's soccer standings
| | Conf. | | | | | | Overall |
| Team | W | | L | | T | PCT | W | | L | | T | PCT |
|---|---|---|---|---|---|---|---|---|---|---|---|---|
| No. 3 Duke ‍†‍‍^{y} | 9 | – | 0 | – | 1 | .950 | 18 | – | 3 | – | 1 | .841 |
| No. 2 Wake Forest ‍‍‍^{y} | 7 | – | 2 | – | 1 | .750 | 16 | – | 4 | – | 4 | .750 |
| No. 13 Florida State ‍‍‡‍^{y} | 7 | – | 2 | – | 1 | .750 | 15 | – | 2 | – | 4 | .810 |
| No. 1 North Carolina ‍‍‍^{y} | 7 | – | 3 | – | 0 | .700 | 22 | – | 5 | – | 0 | .815 |
| No. 7 Virginia Tech ‍‍‍^{y} | 6 | – | 2 | – | 2 | .700 | 14 | – | 6 | – | 3 | .674 |
| No. 6 Notre Dame ‍‍‍^{y} | 5 | – | 1 | – | 4 | .700 | 14 | – | 4 | – | 4 | .727 |
| California ‍‍‍^{y} | 5 | – | 4 | – | 1 | .550 | 13 | – | 6 | – | 2 | .667 |
| No. 4 Stanford ‍‍‍^{y} | 5 | – | 4 | – | 1 | .550 | 16 | – | 5 | – | 2 | .739 |
| Virginia ‍‍‍^{y} | 5 | – | 5 | – | 0 | .500 | 13 | – | 5 | – | 1 | .711 |
| Boston College ‍‍‍ | 4 | – | 4 | – | 2 | .500 | 12 | – | 5 | – | 2 | .684 |
| Pittsburgh ‍‍‍ | 3 | – | 5 | – | 2 | .400 | 9 | – | 6 | – | 3 | .583 |
| Louisville ‍‍‍ | 2 | – | 5 | – | 3 | .350 | 7 | – | 6 | – | 5 | .528 |
| SMU ‍‍‍ | 2 | – | 6 | – | 2 | .300 | 6 | – | 9 | – | 2 | .412 |
| Clemson ‍‍‍ | 2 | – | 7 | – | 1 | .250 | 6 | – | 8 | – | 3 | .441 |
| Miami (FL) ‍‍‍ | 1 | – | 6 | – | 3 | .250 | 5 | – | 8 | – | 4 | .412 |
| NC State ‍‍‍ | 1 | – | 6 | – | 3 | .250 | 4 | – | 10 | – | 4 | .333 |
| Syracuse ‍‍‍ | 0 | – | 9 | – | 1 | .050 | 6 | – | 10 | – | 2 | .389 |
† – Conference champion ‡ – 2024 ACC Tournament champion y – Invited to the NCAA Tournament; As of December 10, 2024; Rankings from United Soccer Coaches Poll; Source: The ACC

The 2024 North Carolina Tar Heels women's soccer team represented the University of North Carolina at Chapel Hill during the 2024 NCAA Division I women's soccer season. This was the 48th season of the university fielding a program. The Tar Heels were led by first-year head coach Damon Nahas and played their home games at Dorrance Field in Chapel Hill, North Carolina.

The Tar Heels were set to be led by Anson Dorrance, but he announced his retirement just four days prior to the season beginning on August 11, 2024. Damon Nahas was selected to be the interim head coach.

Despite a coaching change between the preseason and the start of the regular season, the Tar Heels started the season with two wins on a trip to Colorado. They returned home to face sixteenth ranked Georgia, who they defeated 4–3. They followed that with another Power 4 win against Arizona. They won two games against non-Power 4 opponents before losing to an unranked Duke. The Tar Heels were ranked second for that matchup, and fell to tenth to start ACC play. They began the ACC season with a six-game winning streak, which included defeats of Wake Forest, nineteenth ranked Virginia, and seventeenth ranked California. The streak was broken at seventh ranked Stanford. The Tar Heels rebounded to defeat Clemson before losing the final two games of the ACC season. The losses were against seventeenth ranked Florida State and another loss to Duke; this time, the Blue Devils were ranked first in the nation.

The Tar Heels finished the regular season 14–4–0 and 7–3–0 in ACC play to finish in fourth place. As the fourth seed in the ACC Tournament, they hosted fifth seed and twelfth ranked Virginia Tech in the first round and defeated them 2–0. They faced off against rival Duke for the third time in the season, and got their first win 2–1 to make the finals. The final was a regular season rematch between the Tar Heels and Florida State. The Tar Heels again lost, this time 3–2, to finish as runners up. The Tar Heels received an at-large bid to the 2024 NCAA Division I women's soccer tournament, where they were the second-seed in the Florida State bracket. They defeated USC Upstate in the first round, Santa Clara in the second round, and sixth-seed Minnesota in the Round of 16. Upsets elsewhere in the bracket saw the Tar Heels host Penn State in the quarterfinals. The Tar Heels won 2–1 in overtime to advance to the College Cup. Their semifinal match-up was a fourth meeting in the season with Duke. The Tar Heels won this one 3–0, making the record in the season 2–2, with Duke winning both regular season matches, and the Tar Heels winning both postseason matches. They faced off against Wake Forest in the final, and defeated them 1–0 to win their 22nd national title and first in twelve years. The Tar Heels' final record was 22–5–0.

== Previous season ==
The Tar Heels finished the season 13–2–8 and 5–0–5 in ACC play to finish in fourth place. As the fourth seed in the ACC Tournament, they hosted Pittsburgh in the first round and were upset 1–2 in overtime. They received an at-large bid to the 2023 NCAA Division I women's soccer tournament, where they were the third-seed in the BYU Bracket. They defeated Towson in the first round, six-seed Alabama in a second-round rematch, and second-seed Texas Tech in the Round of 16. They then traveled to Provo, Utah to face one-seed BYU in the quarterfinals. The Tar Heels raced out to a 3–0 lead in the first twenty minutes of the match, but surrendered four goals, three in the last ten minutes, to lose 3–4 to end their season.

== Offseason ==
=== Departures ===
Departures
| Name | Number | Pos. | Height | Year | Hometown | Reason for departure |
|---|---|---|---|---|---|---|
| Nona Reason | 0 | GK | 5'10" | (redshirt) Freshman | Noblesville, Indiana | Transferred to Clemson |
| Savannah King | 3 | DF | 5'6" | Freshman | West Hills, California | Drafted 2nd overall in 2024 NWSL Draft |
| Paige Tolentino | 4 | DF/MF | 5'5" | Senior | Pinehurst, North Carolina | Transferred to NC State |
| Julia Dorsey | 7 | DF | 5'7" | Graduate student | Baltimore, Maryland | Graduated; drafted 40th overall in 2024 NWSL Draft |
| Emily Moxley | 8 | DF/MF | 5'8" | Graduate student | Cary, North Carolina | Graduated |
| Tori DellaPeruta | 9 | FW | 5'8" | Sophomore | Cumming, Georgia | Signed professional contract with Sampdoria |
| Samantha Meza | 10 | MF | 5'4" | Senior | Dallas, Texas | Graduated; drafted 17th overall in 2024 NWSL Draft |
| Sydney Cheesman | 12 | DF | 5'6" | Sophomore | Lafayette, Colorado | Transferred to LSU |
| Isabel Cox | 13 | FW | 5'10" | Graduate student | Greensboro, North Carolina | Graduated |
| Kai Hayes | 14 | MF | 5'4" | Senior | Ponte Vedra Beach, Florida | Graduated, transferred to Baylor |
| Avery Patterson | 15 | MF | 5'6" | Senior | Jacksonville, Florida | Graduated; drafted 19th overall in 2024 NWSL Draft |
| Melina Rebimbas | 16 | MF/DF | 5'6" | Freshman | Warren, New Jersey | Transferred to Alabama |
| Emily Colton | 19 | MF/FW | 5'3" | Junior | Carlsbad, California | Transferred to Wake Forest |
| Ally Sentnor | 21 | MF/FW | 5'3" | (redshirt) Sophomore | Hanson, Massachusetts | Drafted 1st overall in 2024 NWSL Draft |
| Mia Oliaro | 22 | FW/MF | 5'9" | Freshman | Chapel Hill, North Carolina | Transferred to Duke |
| Maci Teater | 23 | MF | 5'3" | Sophomore | St. Louis, Missouri | Transferred to Vanderbilt |
| Talia DellaPeruta | 24 | MF | 5'5" | Senior | Cumming, Georgia | Graduated; Signed professional contract with Sampdoria |
| Maycee Bell | 25 | DF | 5'11" | (redshirt) Senior | Wichita, Kansas | Graduated; drafted 14th overall in 2024 NWSL Draft |
| Kayleigh Herr | 30 | DF | 5'6" | Sophomore | Cary, North Carolina | Transferred to Penn State |
| Emmie Allen | 32 | GK | 5'11" | (redshirt) Sophomore | High Point, North Carolina | Signed with Bay FC |
| Riley Quinlan | 33 | MF | 5'6" | Senior | Wake Forest, North Carolina | Graduated |

=== Incoming transfers ===
Incoming transfers
| Name | Number | Pos. | Height | Year | Hometown | Previous school |
|---|---|---|---|---|---|---|
| Clare Gagne | 0 | GK | 5'10" | Graduate student | Orono, Minnesota | Brown |
| Eden Bretzer | 14 | MF | 5'7" | Junior | Edmonton, Canada | Florida Gulf Coast |
| Olivia Migli | 16 | MF | 5'4" | Graduate student | Haymarket, Virginia | Duke |
| Aria Nagai | 19 | MF | 5'3" | Graduate student | Herndon, Virginia | Princeton |
| Marisa Shorrock | 21 | GK | 5'8" | Graduate student | Westport, Connecticut | Yale |

=== Recruiting class ===
| Name | Nationality | Hometown | Club | TDS rating |
|---|---|---|---|---|
| Aven Alvarez; DF | (United States) | New Hill, North Carolina | NC Courage | 4/5 stars |
| Trinity Armstrong; DF | (United States) | Dallas, Texas | FC Dallas (ECNL) | 4/5 stars |
| Bella Gaetino; MF | (United States) | Dexter, Michigan | Michigan Hawks | 3/5 stars |
| Hannah Johann; GK | (Germany) | Bamberg, Germany | Eintracht Frankfurt | N/A |
| Caitlin Mara; DF | (United States) | Cambridge, Massachusetts | FC Stars of Massachusetts | 3/5 stars |
| Ashley Pennie; MF | (United States) | Miami, Florida | Weston FC | 4/5 stars |
| Logan Tongberg; FW | (United States) | Chevy Chase, Maryland | Bethesda SC Academy | 3/5 stars |
| Linda Ullmark; MF | (United States) | Buffalo, New York | WNY Flash | 4/5 stars |

== Squad ==
=== Roster ===
As of February 7, 2025

Note: Flags indicate national team as defined under FIFA eligibility rules; some limited exceptions apply. Players may hold more than one non-FIFA nationality.

| No. | Pos. | Nation | Player |
|---|---|---|---|
| 0 | GK | USA | Clare Gagne |
| 1 | GK | GER | Hannah Johann |
| 2 | DF | USA | Evelyn Shores |
| 3 | DF | USA | Trinity Armstrong |
| 4 | DF | USA | Aven Alvarez |
| 5 | FW | USA | Maddie Dahlien |
| 6 | MF | USA | Emerson Elgin |
| 7 | MF | USA | Linda Ullmark |
| 8 | MF | USA | Bella Gaetino |
| 11 | MF | USA | Makenna Dominguez |
| 13 | FW | USA | Kate Faasse |
| 14 | MF | CAN | Eden Bretzer |
| 16 | MF | USA | Olivia Migli |
| 17 | DF | USA | Caitlin Mara |

| No. | Pos. | Nation | Player |
|---|---|---|---|
| 18 | MF | USA | Bella Sember |
| 19 | MF | USA | Aria Nagai |
| 20 | MF | USA | Ashley Pennie |
| 21 | GK | USA | Marisa Shorrock |
| 22 | DF | USA | Avery Look |
| 23 | DF | USA | Raegan Williams |
| 25 | FW | USA | Logan Tongberg |
| 31 | MF | USA | Ella Smith |
| 33 | FW | USA | Olivia Thomas |
| 34 | DF | USA | Tessa Dellarose |
| 39 | FW | USA | Asha Means |
| 40 | GK | USA | Abby Gundry |
| 44 | DF | USA | Alexa Wojnovich |

=== Team management ===
| Position | Staff |
|---|---|
| Athletic director | Bubba Cunningham |
| Head coach | Damon Nahas |
| Assistant coach/general manager | Chris Ducar |
| Assistant coach | Tracey Bates Leone |
| Director of operations | Tom Sander |
| Assistant director of operations | Corey Emerick |

== Schedule ==
| Date Time, TV | Rank^{#} | Opponent^{#} | Result | Record | Site (Attendance) City, State |
Exhibition
| August 4; 7:00 p.m. | No. 8т | DC Power FC | W 5–1 | – | Dorrance Field; Chapel Hill, NC |
| August 10; 1:00 p.m. | No. 8т | Davidson | W 3–0 | – | Dorrance Field; Chapel Hill, NC |
Non-conference regular season
| August 15; 9:00 p.m., ESPN+ | No. 8т | at Denver | W 2–1 | 1–0–0 | CIBER Field (1,127); Denver, CO |
| August 18; 2:00 p.m., ESPN+ | No. 8т | at Colorado | W 3–2 | 2–0–0 | Prentup Field (1,876); Boulder, CO |
| August 22; 5:00 p.m., ACCNX | No. 5 | No. 16 Georgia | W 4–3 | 3–0–0 | Dorrance Field (3,219); Chapel Hill, NC |
| August 25; 12:00 p.m., ACCN | No. 5 | Arizona | W 2–0 | 4–0–0 | Dorrance Field (2,073); Chapel Hill, NC |
| August 29; 4:00 p.m., ACCNX | No. 5 | North Dakota | W 3–0 | 5–0–0 | Dorrance Field (3,097); Chapel Hill, NC |
| September 1; 1:00 p.m., ACCNX | No. 5 | Seton Hall | W 2–0 | 6–0–0 | Dorrance Field (1,203); Chapel Hill, NC |
| September 5; 7:00 p.m., ACCN | No. 2 | at Duke; Rivalry | L 0–1 | 6–1–0 | Koskinen Stadium (2,257); Durham, NC |
| September 8; 1:00 p.m., ACCNX | No. 2 | Columbia | W 2–0 | 7–1–0 | Dorrance Field (2,653); Chapel Hill, NC |
ACC regular season
| September 12; 7:00 p.m., ACCNX | No. 10 | Wake Forest | W 1–0 | 8–1–0 (1–0–0) | Dorrance Field (2,942); Chapel Hill, North Carolina |
| September 19; 7:00 p.m., ACCNX | No. 8 | at Pittsburgh | W 1–0 | 9–1–0 (2–0–0) | Ambrose Urbanic Field (1,490); Pittsburgh, PA |
| September 22; 1:00 p.m., ACCNX | No. 8 | at Syracuse | W 1–0 | 10–1–0 (3–0–0) | SU Soccer Stadium (857); Syracuse, NY |
| September 27; 7:00 p.m., ACCNX | No. 2 | No. 19 Virginia | W 3–2 | 11–1–0 (4–0–0) | Dorrance Field (2,979); Chapel Hill, North Carolina |
| October 3; 7:00 p.m., ACCNX | No. 3 | Louisville | W 5–0 | 12–1–0 (5–0–0) | Dorrance Field (2,012); Chapel Hill, North Carolina |
| October 10; 7:00 p.m., ACCNX | No. 2 | at No. 17 California | W 1–0 | 13–1–0 (6–0–0) | Edwards Stadium (688); Berkeley, CA |
| October 13; 4:00 p.m., ACCNX | No. 2 | at No. 7 Stanford | L 0–1 | 13–2–0 (6–1–0) | Cagan Stadium (2,087); Stanford, CA |
| October 17; 7:00 p.m., ACCNX | No. 4 | Clemson | W 6–0 | 14–2–0 (7–1–0) | Dorrance Field (2,237); Chapel Hill, North Carolina |
| October 25; 7:00 p.m., ACCNX | No. 4 | at No. 17 Florida State | L 2–4 | 14–3–0 (7–2–0) | Seminole Soccer Complex (1,684); Tallahassee, FL |
| October 31; 7:00 p.m., ACCNX | No. 8 | No. 1 Duke; Rivalry | L 2–3 | 14–4–0 (7–3–0) | Dorrance Field (3,127); Chapel Hill, North Carolina |
ACC tournament
| November 3; 6:00 p.m., ACCN | (4) No. 8 | (5) No. 12 Virginia Tech; First Round | W 2–0 | 15–4–0 | Dorrance Field (1,347); Chapel Hill, North Carolina |
| November 7; 8:00 p.m., ACCN | (4) No. 8 | vs. (1) No. 1 Duke; Semifinals, Rivalry | W 2–1 | 16–4–0 | WakeMed Soccer Park (1,492); Cary, NC |
| November 10; 12:00 p.m., ESPNU | (4) No. 8 | vs. (3) No. 6 Florida State; Final | L 2–3 | 16–5–0 | WakeMed Soccer Park (2,905); Cary, NC |
NCAA tournament
| November 15; 6:00 p.m., ESPN+ | (2) No. 8 | USC Upstate; First Round | W 8–0 | 17–5–0 | Dorrance Field (1,273); Chapel Hill, North Carolina |
| November 22; 4:30 p.m., ESPN+ | (2) No. 8 | No. 11 Santa Clara; Second Round | W 1–0 | 18–5–0 | Dorrance Field (1,893); Chapel Hill, North Carolina |
| November 24; 5:00 p.m., ESPN+ | (2) No. 8 | (6) Minnesota; Round of 16 | W 3–0 | 19–5–0 | Dorrance Field (1,903); Chapel Hill, North Carolina |
| November 29; 6:00 p.m., ESPN+ | (2) No. 8 | (4) No. 22 Penn State; Quarterfinals | W 2–1 ^{OT} | 20–5–0 | Dorrance Field (2,879); Chapel Hill, North Carolina |
| December 6; 7:30 p.m., ESPNU | (2) No. 8 | (1) No. 1 Duke; Semifinals, Rivalry | W 3–0 | 21–5–0 | WakeMed Soccer Park (10,333); Cary, NC |
| December 9; 7:00 p.m., ESPNU | (2) No. 8 | (2) No. 3 Wake Forest; Final | W 1–0 | 22–5–0 | WakeMed Soccer Park (9,475); Cary, NC |
*Non-conference game. ^{#}Rankings from United Soccer Coaches. (#) Tournament seedings in parentheses. All times are in Eastern.

== Awards and honors ==
| Recipient | Award | Date | Ref. |
|---|---|---|---|
| Olivia Thomas | ACC Co-Offensive Player of the Week – Week 2 | August 27 | |
| Trinity Armstrong | ACC Defensive Player of the Week – Week 6 | September 24 | |
| Linda Ullmark | ACC Offensive Player of the Week – Week 7 | October 1 | |
| Trinity Armstrong | All-ACC First Team | November 6 | |
| Kate Faasse | All-ACC First Team | November 6 | |
| Maddie Dahlien | All-ACC Third Team | November 6 | |
| Tessa Dellarose | All-ACC Third Team | November 6 | |
| Trinity Armstrong | ACC All-Freshman Team | November 6 | |
| Bella Gaetino | ACC All-Freshman Team | November 6 | |
| Linda Ullmark | ACC All-Freshman Team | November 6 | |
| Kate Faasse | All-ACC Tournament Team | November 10 | |
| Trinity Armstrong | All-ACC Tournament Team | November 10 | |
| Maddie Dahlien | All-ACC Tournament Team | November 10 | |
| Linda Ullmark | All-ACC Tournament Team | November 10 | |
| Kate Fassee | Hermann Trophy | January 3, 2025 | |

== Rankings ==
Ranking movements Legend: ██ Increase in ranking ██ Decrease in ranking т = Tied with team above or below ( ) = First-place votes
| | Week | | | | | | | | | | | | | | | | | |
| Poll | Pre | 1 | 2 | 3 | 4 | 5 | 6 | 7 | 8 | 9 | 10 | 11 | 12 | 13 | 14 | 15 | 16 | Final |
|---|---|---|---|---|---|---|---|---|---|---|---|---|---|---|---|---|---|---|
| United Soccer | 8т | 5 | 5 | 2 | 10 | 8 | 4 | 3 | 2 (2) | 4 | 4 | 8 | Not released | | | | | 1 |
| TopDrawer Soccer | 13 | 9 | 4 | 2 | 8 | 6 | 2 | 2 | 1 | 6 | 5 | 8 | 9 | 4 | 4 | 2 | 2 | 1 |
