= Abby Gemma =

American soccer player

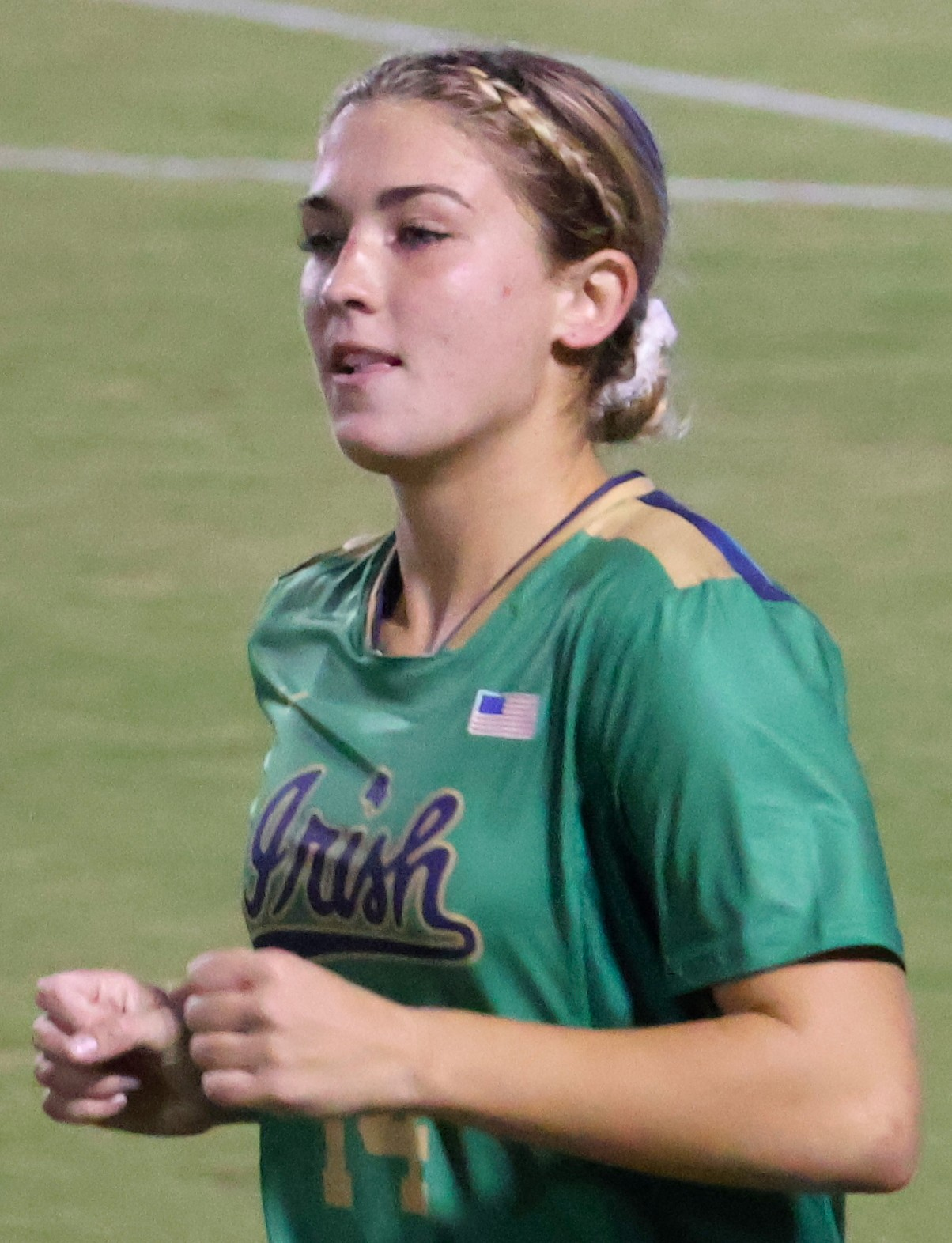
- Gemma with Notre Dame in 2024

Personal information
- Full name: Abigail Linda Gemma
- Date of birth: January 12, 2006 (age 20)
- Place of birth: New Jersey, U.S.
- Height: 5 ft 9 in (1.75 m)
- Position: Center back

Team information
- Current team: UCLA Bruins
- Number: 12

Youth career
- PDA
- 2019–2023: IMG Academy

College career
Years	Team	Apps	(Gls)
2024	Notre Dame Fighting Irish	14	(0)
2025	Florida Gators	18	(1)
2026–	UCLA Bruins	0	(0)

International career
2025–	United States U-20		

Abigail Linda Gemma is an American college soccer player who plays as a center back for the UCLA Bruins. She previously played for the Notre Dame Fighting Irish and Florida Gators.

== Early life ==
Gemma grew up in Flemington, New Jersey. She played club soccer for PDA, winning the ECNL under-13 national title, before moving to IMG Academy in Florida at age 14. She captained the side at IMG and led them to the Girls Academy national finals in 2020. She committed to play college soccer for the Notre Dame Fighting Irish in her junior year. TopDrawerSoccer ranked her as the 19th-best prospect of the 2024 class. Before starting college, she trained with English club Chelsea and the Indy Eleven Pro Academy.

== College career ==
Gemma joined the Notre Dame Fighting Irish in the spring of 2024. She played in 14 games as a freshman, making 8 starts early in the season. She then transferred to the Florida Gators as a sophomore in 2025, commanding an immediate place on the back line. She started all 18 games, leading the team in minutes played, and scored 1 goal, helping the Gators earn their first SEC tournament berth in four years. She then transferred for the second time, joining the UCLA Bruins for her junior year in 2026.

== International career ==
Gemma was called up to the United States under-20 team in November 2025.
