= 2024 NCAA Division I women's soccer rankings =

Soccer rankings

- Season: 2024
- NCAA tournament: 2024
- Preseason No. 1: Florida State
- NCAA Tournament Champions: North Carolina
NCAA Division I women's soccer rankings


Two major human polls made up the 2024 NCAA Division I women's soccer rankings: United Soccer Coaches and Top Drawer Soccer.

== Legend ==
	Increase in ranking
	Decrease in ranking
	New to rankings from previous week
Italics	Number of first place votes
(#–#)	Win-loss record
т	Tied with team above or below also with this symbol

== United Soccer Coaches ==
	Preseason Aug 6	Week 1 Aug 20	Week 2 Aug 27	Week 3 Sep 3	Week 4 Sep 10	Week 5 Sep 17	Week 6 Sep 24	Week 7 Oct 1	Week 8 Oct 8	Week 9 Oct 15	Week 10 Oct 22	Week 11 Oct 29	Final Dec 10	
1.	Florida State (8)	Florida State (2–0–0) (8)	Florida State (3–0–0) (8)	Stanford (4–0–0) (6)	Stanford (6–0–0) (8)	Stanford (8–0–0) (8)	Michigan State (8–0–2) (7)	Arkansas (9–0–1) (8)	Duke (9–1–0) (6)	Duke (11–1–0) (8)	Duke (12–1–0) (8)	Duke (13–1–1) (8)	North Carolina (22–5–0) (8)	1.
2.	Stanford	Stanford (2–0–0)	Stanford (3–0–0)	North Carolina (5–0–0)	Virginia (6–0–0)	Florida State (5–0–1)	Arkansas (7–0–1) (1)	Duke (7–1–0)	North Carolina (12–1–0) (2)	Wake Forest (9–2–2)	Wake Forest (10–2–2)	Mississippi State (15–1–0)	Wake Forest (16–4–4)	2.
3.	BYU	Penn State (1–0–0)	UCLA (3–0–0)	Florida State (4–0–1) (2)	Florida State (5–0–1)	Arkansas (5–0–1)т	Duke (6–1–0)	North Carolina (11–1–0)	Wake Forest (9–2–2)	Mississippi State (12–1–0)	Mississippi State (13–1–0)	Wake Forest (11–3–2)	Duke (18–3–1)	3.
4.	Penn State	BYU (1–0–0)	Michigan State (2–0–1)	Virginia (4–0–0)	Arkansas (5–0–1)	Duke (5–1–0)т	North Carolina (10–1–0)	Wake Forest (8–2–2)	Mississippi State (10–1–0)	North Carolina (13–2–0)	North Carolina (14–2–0)	USC (14–1–2)	Stanford (16–5–2)	4.
5.	Clemson	North Carolina (2–0–0)	North Carolina (3–0–0)	Michigan State (3–0–2)	Michigan State (5–0–2)	Michigan State (6–0–2)	Wake Forest (7–2–2)	Michigan State (8–0–4)	Michigan State (9–0–4)	Arkansas (11–1–1)	Arkansas (12–1–1)	Arkansas (13–1–2)	USC (18–1–4)	5.
6.	Nebraska	UCLA (2–0–0)	Arkansas (2–0–1)	Arkansas (4–0–1)	Auburn (7–0–0)	Auburn (8–0–0)	Stanford (9–1–0)	Florida State (7–0–2)	Arkansas (9–1–1)	Stanford (12–2–1)	USC (13–1–2)	Florida State (11–2–2)	Notre Dame (14–4–4)	6.
7.	Pittsburgh	Pittsburgh (1–0–1)	Virginia (3–0–0)	Memphis (3–0–0)	Memphis (4–0–0)	Utah State (8–0–0)	Florida State (6–0–2)	Ohio State (8–1–3)т	Stanford (11–1–1)	Santa Clara (9–2–2)	Notre Dame (10–1–3)	TCU (14–2–2)	Virginia Tech (14–6–3)	7.
8.	North Carolinaт	Michigan State (1–0–0)	Memphis (2–0–0)	Penn State (4–1–0)	Duke (4–1–0)	North Carolina (8–1–0)	Auburn (9–0–1)	Mississippi State (9–1–0)т	Ohio State (9–1–3)	TCU (11–2–2)	UCLA (13–2–3)	North Carolina (14–3–0)	Penn State (15–7–3)	8.
9.	Texas Techт	Arkansas (1–0–0)	Notre Dame (2–1–0)	Notre Dame (4–1–0)т	Utah State (7–0–0)	Penn State (7–1–1)	Mississippi State (8–1–0)	Stanford (10–1–1)	Iowa (10–0–3)	USC (11–1–2)	TCU (13–2–2)	UCLA (13–3–3)	Arkansas (17–2–3)	9.
10.	Memphis	Memphis (2–0–0)	Santa Clara (2–1–0)	UCLA (4–1–0)т	North Carolina (6–1–0)	Santa Clara (6–2–0)	Utah State (9–0–1)	Santa Clara (7–2–1)	Santa Clara (8–2–1)	UCLA (12–2–2)	Santa Clara (10–2–2)	Ohio State (11–4–3)	Mississippi State (19–3–0)	10.
11.	UCLA	Santa Clara (2–0–0)	Oklahoma State (3–0–0)	Utah State (5–0–0)	Santa Clara (6–1–0)	Texas (7–0–1)	Ohio State (7–1–2)	Iowa (9–0–3)	Utah State (12–0–2)	Auburn (12–1–2)	Iowa (13–1–3)	Santa Clara (11–2–3)	Ohio State (14–6–3)	11.
12.	Saint Louis	Texas (2–0–0)	Penn State (2–1–0)	Santa Clara (4–1–0)	Penn State (5–1–1)	Oklahoma State (8–0–1)	Santa Clara (6–2–1)	Utah State (10–0–2)	TCU (9–2–2)	Notre Dame (8–1–3)	Stanford (13–3–1)	Virginia Tech (11–3–3)	Iowa (15–3–4)	12.
13.	Michigan State	TCU (2–0–0)	Auburn (3–0–0)	Oklahoma State (4–0–0)т	Notre Dame (6–1–0)	Wake Forest (6–2–1)	Notre Dame (7–1–1)	Pepperdine (6–2–2)	Notre Dame (8–1–2)	Pepperdine (9–2–3)	Auburn (12–1–3)	Notre Dame (10–2–4)	Florida State (15–2–4)	13.
14.	Georgia	Notre Dame (1–1–0)	Texas (3–0–1)	Auburn (5–0–0)т	Texas (6–0–1)	Virginia (8–1–0)	Pepperdine (6–2–2)	Colorado (10–1–1)	Auburn (11–1–1)	Iowa (11–1–3)	Texas Tech (13–2–2)	Stanford (13–3–1)т	Michigan State (14–3–5)	14.
15.	Notre Dame	Auburn (1–0–0)	Xavier (2–0–1)	Xavier (4–0–1)	Oklahoma State (6–0–1)	Memphis (5–1–0)	Penn State (8–2–1)	Memphis (7–1–1)	Pepperdine (8–2–2)	Ohio State (10–2–3)	Penn State (11–4–3)	South Carolina (8–1–7)т	Vanderbilt (10–4–7)	15.
16.	Arkansas	Georgia (0–0–1)	Ohio State (3–0–0)	Texas (4–0–1)	Xavier (7–0–1)	Notre Dame (6–1–1)	Colorado (9–1–0)	Auburn (10–1–1)	Memphis (8–1–1)	Penn State (11–3–2)	Memphis (10–1–2)	Michigan State (12–1–5)	TCU (17–4–2)	16.
17.	Texas	Oklahoma State (2–0–0)	BYU (1–0–2)	Ohio State (3–0–1)	Iowa (3–0–2)	Ohio State (6–1–1)	Memphis (5–1–1)	Notre Dame (7–1–2)	California (10–1–2)	Memphis (9–1–2)	Florida State (10–2–2)	Texas Tech (13–3–2)т	Minnesota (14–5–3)	17.
18.	Mississippi State	Ohio State (1–0–0)	Wake Forest (3–0–0)	Colorado (4–0–0)	Pepperdine (3–2–2)	Iowa (6–0–2)	Iowa (7–0–3)	California (10–1–2)	Georgetown (8–1–4)	Virginia Tech (10–3–2)	Michigan State (11–1–5)	Iowa (13–2–3)т	UCLA (17–4–3)	18.
19.	Wisconsin	Xavier (2–0–0)	Saint Louis (1–0–2)	Saint Louis (2–1–2)	Colorado (6–1–0)	Pepperdine (4–2–2)	Virginia (8–2–0)	Penn State (9–3–1)	USC (9–1–2)	Texas Tech (11–2–2)	Virginia Tech (10–3–2)	Memphis (11–1–3)	Wisconsin (10–6–5)	19.
20.	Alabama	Mississippi State (2–0–0)	Utah State (3–0–0)	Pepperdine (2–2–1)	Ohio State (4–1–1)	Kentucky (8–0–0)	Saint Louis (6–1–3)	Georgetown (7–1–3)	Penn State (9–3–2)	Xavier (12–1–2)	Pepperdine (9–3–3)	Georgetown (11–2–4)	Santa Clara (13–4–4)	20.
21.	South Carolina	Virginia (2–0–0)т	South Carolina (2–0–0)	Virginia Tech (4–0–1)	Kentucky (6–0–0)	Colorado (7–1–0)	Xavier (8–1–1)	USC (8–1–2)	Virginia Tech (9–3–2)	Michigan State (9–1–5)	Ohio State (10–4–3)	Texas (13–3–2)	Texas (17–4–2)	21.
22.	Santa Clara	Virginia Tech (2–0–0)т	Colorado (3–0–0)	Iowa (2–0–2)	UCLA (4–2–1)	Saint Louis (4–1–3)	TCU (7–2–1)	Texas (9–1–2)	Florida State (7–2–2)	Florida State (8–2–2)	South Carolina (7–1–6)	Penn State (11–5–3)т	Saint Louis (15–2–6)	22.
23.	USC	Saint Louis (0–0–1)	Georgetown (2–0–1)	Georgetown (3–0–1)	Saint Louis (3–1–3)	Xavier (7–1–1)	South Carolina (5–0–4)	TCU (8–2–2)	South Carolina (5–1–5)	Virginia (10–4–0)	Georgetown (10–2–4)	Pepperdine (10–3–4)т	South Carolina (11–4–7)	23.
24.	Duke	Texas A&M (1–0–0)т	Georgia (1–1–1)	Alabama (5–1–0)	Liberty (6–0–1)	Mississippi State (6–1–0)	USC (7–1–1)	South Carolina (5–1–4)	Texas Tech (10–2–1)	Texas (11–2–2)	Virginia (10–5–0)	Auburn (12–2–4)	Texas Tech (15–5–2)	24.
25.	Iowaт; Texas A&Mт	Iowa (1–0–0)т	NC State (1–2–1)	Clemson (3–1–0)	South Carolina (1–0–3)	USC (5–1–1)	Texas Tech (7–2–1)	Virginia (8–3–0)	Virginia (8–4–0)	California (10–3–2)	Xavier (13–2–2)	Utah State (15–1–4)	Auburn (13–4–4)	25.
	Preseason Aug 6	Week 1 Aug 20	Week 2 Aug 27	Week 3 Sep 3	Week 4 Sep 10	Week 5 Sep 17	Week 6 Sep 24	Week 7 Oct 1	Week 8 Oct 8	Week 9 Oct 15	Week 10 Oct 22	Week 11 Oct 29	Final Dec 10	
		Dropped: No. 5 Clemson; No. 6 Nebraska; No. 8т Texas Tech; No. 19 Wisconsin; No. 20 Alabama; No. 21 South Carolina; No. 23 USC; No. 24 Duke	Dropped: No. 7 Pittsburgh; No. 13 TCU; No. 20 Mississippi State; No. 21т Virginia Tech; No. 24т Texas A&M; No. 24т Iowa	Dropped: No. 17 BYU; No. 18 Wake Forest; No. 21 South Carolina; No. 24 Georgia; No. 25 NC State	Dropped: No. 21 Virginia Tech; No. 23 Georgetown; No. 24 Alabama; No. 25 Clemson	Dropped: No. 22 UCLA; No. 24 Liberty; No. 25 South Carolina	Dropped: No. 11 Texas; No. 12 Oklahoma State; No. 20 Kentucky	Dropped: No. 20 Saint Louis; No. 21 Xavier; No. 25 Texas Tech	Dropped: No. 14 Colorado; No. 22 Texas	Dropped: No. 11 Utah State; No. 18 Georgetown; No. 23 South Carolina	Dropped: No. 24 Texas; No. 25 California	Dropped: No. 24 Virginia; No. 25 Xavier	Dropped: No. 19 Memphis; No. 20 Georgetown; No. 22т Pepperdine; No. 25 Utah State	

== Top Drawer Soccer ==
	Week 1 Aug 12	Week 2 Aug 19	Week 3 Aug 26	Week 4 Sep 2	Week 5 Sep 9	Week 6 Sep 16	Week 7 Sep 23	Week 8 Sep 30	Week 9 Oct 7	Week 10 Oct 14	Week 11 Oct 21	Week 12 Oct 28	Week 13 Nov 4	Week 14 Nov 11	Week 15 Nov 18	Week 16 Nov 25	Week 17 Dec 2	Final Dec 10	
1.	Florida State	Florida State (2–0–0)	Florida State (3–0–0)	Stanford (5–0–0)	Stanford (7–0–0)	Stanford (8–0–0)	Arkansas (7–0–1)	Arkansas (9–0–1)	North Carolina (12–1–0)	Duke (11–1–0)	Duke (12–1–0)	Mississippi State (15–1–0)	Mississippi State (16–1–0)	Florida State (14–2–3)	Florida State (15–2–3)	Wake Forest (15–3–3)	Wake Forest (15–3–4)	North Carolina (22–5–0)	1.
2.	Stanford	Stanford (2–0–0)	Stanford (4–0–0)	North Carolina (6–0–0)	Virginia (7–0–0)	Auburn (8–0–0)	North Carolina (10–1–0)	North Carolina (11–1–0)	Wake Forest (9–2–2)	Wake Forest (9–2–2)	Wake Forest (10–2–2)	Duke (13–1–1)	Duke (14–1–1)	UCLA (16–3–3)	UCLA (17–3–3)	North Carolina (19–5–0)	North Carolina (20–5–0)	Wake Forest (16–4–4)	2.
3.	Pittsburgh	Texas (2–0–0)	UCLA (4–0–0)	Virginia (5–0–0)	Florida State (5–0–1)	Florida State (5–0–1)	Michigan State (8–0–2)	Wake Forest (8–2–2)	Duke (9–1–0)	Mississippi State (12–1–0)	Mississippi State (13–1–0)	Wake Forest (11–3–2)	Wake Forest (12–3–2)	Wake Forest (12–3–3)	Wake Forest (13–3–3)	Duke (17–2–1)	Duke (18–2–1)	Duke (18–3–1)	3.
4.	Texas	UCLA (2–0–0)	North Carolina (4–0–0)	Florida State (4–0–1)	Auburn (7–0–0)	Texas (7–0–1)	Wake Forest (7–2–2)	Florida State (7–0–2)	Mississippi State (10–1–0)	Arkansas (11–1–1)	Arkansas (12–1–1)	Florida State (11–2–2)	Florida State (13–2–2)	North Carolina (16–5–0)	North Carolina (17–5–0)	USC (18–1–3)	Stanford (16–4–2)	Stanford (16–5–2)	4.
5.	UCLA	Penn State (1–0–0)	Virginia (4–0–0)	Penn State (4–1–0)	Memphis (5–0–0)	Arkansas (5–0–1)	Auburn (9–0–1)	Duke (7–1–0)	Stanford (11–1–1)	Stanford (12–2–1)	North Carolina (14–2–0)	USC (14–1–2)	USC (15–1–2)	Duke (14–2–1)	Duke (15–2–1)	Penn State (15–6–3)	USC (18–1–4)	USC (18–1–4)	5.
6.	Clemson	Pittsburgh (1–0–1)	Memphis (3–0–0)	UCLA (5–1–0)	Texas (6–0–1)	North Carolina (8–1–0)	Stanford (9–1–0)	Mississippi State (9–1–1)	Arkansas (9–1–1)	North Carolina (13–2–0)	Florida State (9–2–2)	TCU (14–2–2)	TCU (15–2–2)	Mississippi State (17–2–0)	Mississippi State (18–2–0)	Notre Dame (14–3–4)	Penn State (15–7–3)	Penn State (15–7–3)	6.
7.	Penn State	Georgia (0–0–1)	Penn State (2–1–0)	Memphis (4–0–0)	Arkansas (5–0–1)	Kentucky (8–0–0)	Florida State (6–0–2)	Stanford (10–1–1)	Michigan State (9–0–4)	Florida State (7–2–2)	Notre Dame (10–1–3)	Arkansas (13–1–2)	Arkansas (13–1–2)	USC (15–1–3)	USC (15–1–3)	Stanford (15–4–2)	Notre Dame (14–4–4)	Notre Dame (14–4–4)	7.
8.	Saint Louis	Memphis (2–0–0)	Georgia (1–1–1)	Texas (4–0–1)	North Carolina (7–1–0)	Virginia (8–1–0)	Duke (6–1–0)	Michigan State (8–0–4)	Notre Dame (8–1–2)	Pittsburgh (9–3–2)	USC (13–1–2)	North Carolina (14–3–0)	UCLA (13–3–3)	Texas (16–3–2)	Texas (17–3–2)	Virginia Tech (14–5–3)	Virginia Tech (14–6–3)	Virginia Tech (14–6–3)	8.
9.	Nebraska	North Carolina (2–0–0)	Texas (3–0–1)	Arkansas (4–0–1)	Kentucky (7–0–0)	Penn State (7–1–1)	Notre Dame (7–1–1)	Notre Dame (7–1–2)	Auburn (11–1–1)	Penn State (11–3–2)	Stanford (13–3–1)	Michigan State (12–1–5)	North Carolina (15–4–0)	Arkansas (14–2–2)	Arkansas (15–2–2)	Mississippi State (19–3–0)	Mississippi State (19–3–0)	Mississippi State (19–3–0)	9.
10.	Memphis	BYU (1–0–0)	Arkansas (2–0–1)	Auburn (5–0–0)	Penn State (5–1–1)	Michigan State (6–0–2)	Virginia (8–2–0)	Virginia (8–3–0)	California (10–1–2)	California (10–3–2)	UCLA (13–2–3)	Notre Dame (10–2–4)	Ohio State (12–5–3)	Ohio State (12–5–3)	Ohio State (13–5–3)	Arkansas (16–2–3)	Arkansas (16–2–3)	Arkansas (16–2–3)	10.
11.	Georgia	Mississippi State (2–0–0)	Auburn (3–0–0)	Clemson (4–1–0)	Notre Dame (6–1–0)	Memphis (5–1–0)	Penn State (8–2–1)	Texas (9–1–2)	Iowa (10–0–3)	Notre Dame (8–1–3)	Penn State (11–4–3)	Stanford (13–3–1)	Penn State (12–5–3)	TCU (16–3–2)	TCU (17–3–2)	Ohio State (14–6–3)	Ohio State (14–6–3)	Ohio State (14–6–3)	11.
12.	Notre Dame	Michigan State (1–0–0)	Michigan State (2–0–1)	Oklahoma State (5–0–0)	Michigan State (5–0–2)	Oklahoma State (8–0–1)	Mississippi State (8–1–0)	Auburn (10–1–1)	Florida State (6–2–2)	Auburn (12–1–2)	TCU (13–2–2)	UCLA (13–3–3)	Michigan State (12–2–5)	Penn State (12–6–3)	Penn State (13–6–3)	Michigan State (14–3–5)	Michigan State (14–3–5)	Michigan State (14–3–5)	12.
13.	North Carolina	Auburn (1–0–0)	Clemson (2–1–0)	Notre Dame (4–1–0)	Xavier (7–0–1)	Pittsburgh (7–1–1)	Texas (7–1–2)	California (10–1–2)	Pittsburgh (8–3–2)	UCLA (12–2–2)	Michigan State (11–1–5)	Ohio State (11–4–3)	Notre Dame (11–3–4)	Michigan State (12–2–5)	Michigan State (13–2–5)	Minnesota (14–5–3)	Minnesota (14–5–3)	Minnesota (14–5–3)	13.
14.	BYU	Arkansas (1–0–0)	Oklahoma State (4–0–0)	Michigan State (3–0–2)	UCLA (5–2–1)	Utah State (8–0–0)	UCLA (8–2–1)	Iowa (9–0–3)	Penn State (9–3–2)	TCU (11–2–2)	Iowa (13–1–3)	Penn State (11–5–3)	Texas (13–3–2)	Notre Dame (11–3–4)	Notre Dame (12–3–4)	Iowa (15–3–4)	Iowa (15–3–4)	Iowa (15–3–4)	14.
15.	Mississippi State	Saint Louis (0–0–1)	Saint Louis (1–0–2)	Xavier (5–0–1)	Oklahoma State (6–0–1)	Wake Forest (6–2–1)	Xavier (8–1–1)	Pittsburgh (7–3–2)	Rutgers (8–1–3)	USC (11–1–2)	Santa Clara (10–2–2)	Minnesota (12–3–3)	Stanford (13–4–1)	Stanford (13–4–1)	Stanford (14–4–1)	Vanderbilt (10–4–7)	Vanderbilt (10–4–7)	Vanderbilt (10–4–7)	15.
16.	Michigan State	Clemson (1–1–0)	BYU (1–0–2)	Pittsburgh (4–1–1)	Pittsburgh (6–1–1)	Notre Dame (6–1–1)	Pittsburgh (7–2–1)	Penn State (9–3–1)	UCLA (10–2–2)	Michigan State (9–1–5)	Auburn (12–1–3)	Iowa (13–2–3)	Georgetown (12–2–4)	Kansas (13–5–4)	Minnesota (13–4–3)	Wisconsin (10–6–5)	Wisconsin (10–6–5)	Wisconsin (10–6–5)	16.
17.	Arkansas	Oklahoma State (2–0–0)	Notre Dame (2–1–0)	Utah State (5–0–0)	Utah State (7–0–0)	UCLA (6–2–1)	Utah State (9–0–1)	Rutgers (8–1–2)	TCU (9–2–2)	Iowa (11–1–3)	Texas Tech (13–2–2)	Xavier (14–2–2)	Minnesota (12–4–3)	Minnesota (12–4–3)	South Carolina (11–3–7)	Florida State (15–2–4)	Florida State (15–2–4)	Florida State (15–2–4)	17.
18.	Texas Tech	Harvard (0–0–0)	Harvard (0–0–0)	Georgia (1–2–2)	Clemson (4–1–2)	Xavier (7–1–1)	Colorado (9–1–0)	UCLA (9–2–2)	Xavier (11–1–2)	Xavier (12–1–2)	South Carolina (7–1–6)	Texas (13–3–2)	BYU (9–5–5)	South Carolina (10–3–7)	Iowa (14–2–4)	UCLA (17–4–3)	UCLA (17–4–3)	UCLA (17–4–3)	18.
19.	Harvard	Texas Tech (1–1–0)	Pittsburgh (2–1–1)	Iowa (3–0–2)	Georgia (2–2–2)	Georgia (4–2–2)	South Carolina (5–0–4)	Xavier (9–1–2)	Ohio State (9–1–3)	Rutgers (9–2–3)	Oklahoma State (13–2–3)	Santa Clara (11–2–3)	Iowa (13–2–4)	BYU (9–6–5)	Saint Louis (15–1–6)	Texas (17–4–2)	Texas (17–4–2)	Texas (17–4–2)	19.
20.	USC	Notre Dame (1–1–0)	Wake Forest (3–0–1)	Wake Forest (3–1–1)	Iowa (4–0–2)	Iowa (6–0–2)	Kentucky (8–1–1)	Ohio State (8–1–3)	Utah State (12–0–2)	Santa Clara (9–2–2)	Vanderbilt (8–2–5)	Virginia Tech (10–4–3)	Texas Tech (14–3–2)	Iowa (13–2–4)	Georgetown (13–3–4)	TCU (17–4–2)	TCU (17–4–2)	TCU (17–4–2)	20.
21.	Georgetown	South Carolina (1–0–0)	South Carolina (2–0–0)	Mississippi State (5–1–0)	Duke (4–1–0)	Duke (5–1–0)	Saint Louis (6–1–3)	South Carolina (5–1–5)	Santa Clara (8–2–1)	Pepperdine (9–2–3)	Xavier (13–2–2)	South Carolina (8–1–7)	South Carolina (8–2–7)	Saint Louis (14–1–6)	Texas Tech (15–4–2)	South Carolina (11–4–7)	South Carolina (11–4–7)	South Carolina (11–4–7)	21.
22.	South Carolina	Virginia (2–0–0)	Mississippi State (3–1–0)	Santa Clara (5–1–0)	Wake Forest (5–1–1)	Mississippi State (6–1–0)	California (8–1–2)	Utah State (10–0–2)	Pepperdine (8–2–2)	Texas (11–2–2)	Texas (11–3–2)	Oklahoma State (13–3–3)	Washington (10–5–3)	Georgetown (12–3–4)	Virginia Tech (15–4–2)	Saint Louis (15–2–6)	Saint Louis (15–2–6)	Saint Louis (15–2–6)	22.
23.	Virginia	Santa Clara (2–0–0)	Santa Clara (3–1–0)	Saint Louis (2–1–2)	South Carolina (2–0–3)	Tennessee (5–1–1)	Oklahoma State (8–2–1)	Colorado (10–1–1)	Texas (9–2–2)	Ohio State (10–2–3)	Ohio State (10–4–3)	Auburn (12–2–4)	Xavier (14–3–2)	Texas Tech (14–4–2)	Connecticut (14–4–4)	Georgetown (13–4–4)	Georgetown (13–4–4)	Georgetown (13–4–4)	23.
24.	Colorado	USC (0–1–1)	Utah State (3–0–0)	Ohio State (3–0–1)	Mississippi State (5–1–0)	Saint Louis (4–1–3)	Iowa (7–0–3)	Santa Clara (7–2–1)	South Carolina (5–1–5)	Washington (8–4–2)	Maine (10–1–2)	Vanderbilt (9–2–6)	Virginia Tech (11–5–3)	Virginia Tech (11–5–3)	Santa Clara (13–3–4)	Texas Tech (15–5–2)	Texas Tech (15–5–2)	Texas Tech (15–5–2)	24.
25.	Santa Clara	Nebraska (1–1–0)	Buffalo (2–0–0)	South Carolina (2–0–2)	Santa Clara (6–1–0)	Santa Clara (6–2–0)	Tennessee (6–1–2)	Pepperdine (6–2–2)	Texas Tech (9–3–1)	Texas Tech (11–2–2)	Pepperdine (9–3–3)	Texas Tech (13–3–2)	Santa Clara (11–3–3)	Connecticut (13–4–4)	California (13–5–2)	Connecticut (14–5–4)	Connecticut (14–5–4)	Connecticut (14–5–4)	25.
	Week 1 Aug 12	Week 2 Aug 19	Week 3 Aug 26	Week 4 Sep 2	Week 5 Sep 9	Week 6 Sep 16	Week 7 Sep 23	Week 8 Sep 30	Week 9 Oct 7	Week 10 Oct 14	Week 11 Oct 21	Week 12 Oct 28	Week 13 Nov 4	Week 14 Nov 11	Week 15 Nov 18	Week 16 Nov 25	Week 17 Dec 2	Final Dec 10	
		Dropped: No. 21 Georgetown; No. 24 Colorado	Dropped: No. 19 Texas Tech; No. 24 USC; No. 25 Nebraska	Dropped: No. 16 BYU; No. 18 Harvard; No. 25 Buffalo	Dropped: No. 23 Saint Louis; No. 24 Ohio State	Dropped: No. 18 Clemson; No. 23 South Carolina	Dropped: No. 11 Memphis; No. 19 Georgia; No. 25 Santa Clara	Dropped: No. 20 Kentucky; No. 21 Saint Louis; No. 23 Oklahoma State; No. 25 Tennessee	Dropped: No. 10 Virginia; No. 23 Colorado	Dropped: No. 20 Utah State; No. 24 South Carolina	Dropped: No. 8 Pittsburgh; No. 10 California; No. 19 Rutgers; No. 24 Washington	Dropped: No. 24 Maine; No. 25 Pepperdine	Dropped: No. 22 Oklahoma State; No. 23 Auburn; No. 24 Vanderbilt	Dropped: No. 22 Washington; No. 23 Xavier; No. 25 Santa Clara	Dropped: No. 16 Kansas; No. 19 BYU	Dropped: No. 24 Santa Clara; No. 25 California	Dropped: None	None	
