= 2024 Duke Blue Devils women's soccer team =

American college soccer season

2024 Duke Blue Devils women's soccer

ACC Regular Season Champions

NCAA Tournament, College Cup
- Conference: Atlantic Coast Conference
- U. Soc. Coaches poll: No. 3
- TopDrawerSoccer.com: No. 3
- Record: 18–3–1 (9–0–1 ACC)
- Head coach: Robbie Church (24th season)
- Assistant coaches: Kieran Hall (6th season); Carla Overbeck (31st season); Jason Lowe (1st season)
- Captains: Nicky Chico; Maggie Graham; Kelly Wilson
- Home stadium: Koskinen Stadium

2024 ACC women's soccer standings
	Conf.						Overall
Team	W		L		T	PCT	W		L		T	PCT
No. 3 Duke ‍†‍‍^{y}	9	–	0	–	1	.950	18	–	3	–	1	.841
No. 2 Wake Forest ‍‍‍^{y}	7	–	2	–	1	.750	16	–	4	–	4	.750
No. 13 Florida State ‍‍‡‍^{y}	7	–	2	–	1	.750	15	–	2	–	4	.810
No. 1 North Carolina ‍‍‍^{y}	7	–	3	–	0	.700	22	–	5	–	0	.815
No. 7 Virginia Tech ‍‍‍^{y}	6	–	2	–	2	.700	14	–	6	–	3	.674
No. 6 Notre Dame ‍‍‍^{y}	5	–	1	–	4	.700	14	–	4	–	4	.727
California ‍‍‍^{y}	5	–	4	–	1	.550	13	–	6	–	2	.667
No. 4 Stanford ‍‍‍^{y}	5	–	4	–	1	.550	16	–	5	–	2	.739
Virginia ‍‍‍^{y}	5	–	5	–	0	.500	13	–	5	–	1	.711
Boston College ‍‍‍	4	–	4	–	2	.500	12	–	5	–	2	.684
Pittsburgh ‍‍‍	3	–	5	–	2	.400	9	–	6	–	3	.583
Louisville ‍‍‍	2	–	5	–	3	.350	7	–	6	–	5	.528
SMU ‍‍‍	2	–	6	–	2	.300	6	–	9	–	2	.412
Clemson ‍‍‍	2	–	7	–	1	.250	6	–	8	–	3	.441
Miami (FL) ‍‍‍	1	–	6	–	3	.250	5	–	8	–	4	.412
NC State ‍‍‍	1	–	6	–	3	.250	4	–	10	–	4	.333
Syracuse ‍‍‍	0	–	9	–	1	.050	6	–	10	–	2	.389
† – Conference champion ‡ – 2024 ACC Tournament champion y – Invited to the NCAA Tournament; As of December 10, 2024; Rankings from United Soccer Coaches Poll; Source: The ACC

The 2024 Duke Blue Devils women's soccer team represented Duke University during the 2024 NCAA Division I women's soccer season. The Blue Devils were led by head coach Robbie Church, in his twenty-fourth season. This season was Church's last, as he retired at the end of the season. They played their home games at Koskinen Stadium. This was the team's 37th season playing organized women's college soccer and their 36th playing in the Atlantic Coast Conference.

The Blue Devils started the season ranked twenty-fourth, but quickly fell out of the rankings after an opening day loss against Ohio State. They rebouneded with a win over Power 4 opponent Nebraska before winning a rivalry match-up with second ranked North Carolina 1–0. Combined with a 5–0 win over ETSU, the Blue Devils re-entered the rankings at number eight. They finished the non-conference season with an emphatic 7–0 win over Power 4 opponent Missouri. They began ACC play tied for third in the national rankings. They won their first seven straight ACC matches, a streak which included three wins over ranked teams. They defeated number twenty five Virginia, number seven Stanford and number seventeen California. After the defeat of Stanford, they rose to first in the national rankings. Their final three games were all against ranked teams. They drew seventh ranked Notre Dame, defeated second ranked Wake Forest and again defeated North Carolina on the final day of the ACC season.

The Blue Devils finished the regular season 14–1–1 and 9–0–1 in ACC play to finish as conference champions. This was Duke's fourth regular season ACC title in program history. As the first seed in the ACC Tournament, they earned a bye to the Semifinals where they faced North Carolina for a third time this season. Duke could not make it three wins in a row and lost 2–1. The Blue Devils received an at-large bid to the 2024 NCAA Division I women's soccer tournament where they were the first seed in the Duke Bracket. They were also the top overall seed in the tournament. They defeated Howard in the First Round, eighth seed and seventeenth ranked Texas Tech in the Second Round, and fifth-seed and sixteenth ranked Michigan State in the Round of 16. They defeated fellow ACC team Virginia Tech, who was the seventh seed and ranked twelfth, 1–0 in the Quarterfinals. Duke advanced to the College Cup and faced North Carolina for a fourth time this season. North Carolina won 3–0 to end Duke's season. Duke won both regular season matches, and the Tar Heels won both postseason matches between the rivals. The Blue Devil's final record was 18–3–1. Their eighteen wins were the most since 2017, the last time they made the College Cup.

== Previous season ==
The Blue Devils finished 6–7–3 overall and 2–5–3 in ACC play to finish in a tie for tenth place. They did not qualify for the ACC Tournament and were not invited to the NCAA Tournament. This marked the first time since 2014 Duke had not been invited to the NCAA Tournament and first time since 2015 they had not qualified for the ACC Tournament. Their six overall wins were the lowest in program history.

== Offseason ==
=== Departures ===
Departures
Name	Number	Pos.	Height	Year	Hometown	Reason for departure
Caroline Duffy	1	GK	5'10"	Sophomore	Clarksville, Maryland	Transferred to Oklahoma
Dieynaba Ndaw	3	FW	5'6"	Junior	Dakar, Senegal	Transferred to Miami (FL)
Grace Watkins	9	FW	5'3"	Senior	Manhattan Beach, California	Graduated
Olivia Migli	10	DF	5'4"	Senior	Haymarket, Virginia	Graduated; transferred to North Carolina
Kati Druzina	14	MF/DF	5'6"	Graduate Student	Kirtland, Ohio	Graduated
Emily Royson	15	DF	5'6"	Senior	Toms River, New Jersey	Graduated
Kiera Clemens	23	MF	5'9"	Freshman	Raleigh, North Carolina	—

=== Incoming transfers ===
Incoming transfers
Name	Number	Pos.	Height	Year	Hometown	Previous school
Ella Hase	3	FW	5'5"	Graduate Student	Orland Park, Illinois	Northwestern
Mia Oliaro	15	FW/MF	5'9"	Sophomore	Chapel Hill, North Carolina	North Carolina
Hannah Bebar	18	MF	5'4"	Graduate Student	Naperville, Illinois	Harvard
Farrah Walters	27	FW	5'6"	Junior	Scottsdale, Arizona	Santa Clara

=== Recruiting class ===
Name	Nationality	Hometown	Club	TDS Rating
Caroline Dysart; GK	(United States)	San Diego, California	San Diego Surf	3/5 stars
Mary Long; MF	(United States)	Mission Hills, Kansas	Slammers FC HB Koge	4/5 stars
Lauren Martinho; MF	(United States)	Cary, North Carolina	NC Courage ECNL	5/5 stars
Sophia Recupero; FW	(United States)	Hopkinton, Massachusetts	FC Stars of Massachusetts	3/5 stars

== Squad ==
=== Roster ===
As of February 10, 2025

Note: Flags indicate national team as defined under FIFA eligibility rules; some limited exceptions apply. Players may hold more than one non-FIFA nationality.

No.	Pos.	Nation	Player
0	GK	USA	Leah Freeman
2	FW	USA	Kat Rader
3	FW	USA	Ella Hase
4	DF	USA	Baleigh Bruster
5	DF	USA	Phoebe Goldthwaite
6	MF	USA	Devin Lynch
7	DF	USA	Cameron Roller
8	FW	USA	Elle Piper
9	MF	USA	Lauren Martinho
10	MF	USA	Mary Long
11	FW	USA	Julia Saunicheva
12	MF	USA	Taylor Evans
13	FW	USA	Mia Minestrella
14	FW	USA	Sophia Recupero

No.	Pos.	Nation	Player
15	FW	USA	Mia Oliaro
16	MF	USA	Carina Lageyre
17	DF	USA	Nicole Chico
18	MF	USA	Hannah Bebar
19	MF	USA	Maggie Graham
20	DF	USA	Kelly Wilson
21	DF	USA	Katie Groff
22	DF	USA	Sam Bodensteiner
24	DF	USA	Kaeden Koons-Perdikis
25	FW	USA	Madison Foxhoven
26	GK	USA	Bianca Dominguez
27	FW	USA	Farrah Walters
30	GK	USA	Caroline Dysart

=== Team management ===
Position	Staff
Head coach	Robbie Church
Assistant coach	Kieran Hall
Assistant coach	Carla Overbeck
Assistant coach	Jason Lowe
Director of Operations	Erin Stephenson

== Schedule ==
Date Time, TV	Rank^{#}	Opponent^{#}	Result	Record	Site (Attendance) City, State
Exhibition
August 5*; 5:00 p.m.	No. 24	Furman	W 9–0	—	Koskinen Stadium; Durham, NC
August 8*; 5:00 p.m.	No. 24	DC Power FC	Canceled	—	Koskinen Stadium; Durham, NC
Non-conference regular season
August 15*; 7:00 p.m., BTN+	No. 24	at Ohio State	L 0–1	0–1–0	Jesse Owens Memorial Stadium (931); Columbus, OH
August 22*; 8:00 p.m., BTN+		at Nebraska	W 3–0	1–1–0	Hibner Stadium (1,320); Lincoln, NE
August 29*; 7:00 p.m., ACCNX		UNC Wilimington	W 4–0	2–1–0	Koskinen Stadium (672); Durham, NC
September 1*; 5:00 p.m., ACCN		Tennessee	Canceled	2–1–0	Koskinen Stadium; Durham, NC
September 5*; 7:00 p.m., ACCN		No. 2 North Carolina; Rivalry	W 1–0	3–1–0	Koskinen Stadium (2,257); Durham, NC
September 8*; 6:00 p.m., ACCNX		ETSU	W 5–0	4–1–0	Koskinen Stadium (491); Durham, NC
September 12*; 7:00 p.m., ACCNX	No. 8	Missouri	W 7–0	5–1–0	Koskinen Stadium (465); Durham, NC
ACC regular season
September 19; 7:00 p.m., ACCN	No. 3т	at Clemson	W 3–1	6–1–0 (1–0–0)	Riggs Field (804); Clemson, SC
September 27; 7:00 p.m., ACCNX	No. 3	SMU	W 3–0	7–1–0 (2–0–0)	Koskinen Stadium (397); Durham, NC
October 3; 7:00 p.m., ACCNX	No. 2	No. 25 Virginia	W 3–1	8–1–0 (3–0–0)	Koskinen Stadium (879); Durham, NC
October 6; 1:00 p.m., ACCNX	No. 2	Louisville	W 3–1	9–1–0 (4–0–0)	Koskinen Stadium (770); Durham, NC
October 10; 10:00 p.m., ACCNX	No. 1	at No. 7 Stanford	W 4–1	10–1–0 (5–0–0)	Cagan Stadium (2,348); Stanford, CA
October 13; 4:00 p.m., ACCNX	No. 1	at No. 17 California	W 2–1	11–1–0 (6–0–0)	Edwards Stadium (1,389); Berkeley, CA
October 19; 7:00 p.m., ACCNX	No. 1	Boston College	W 7–0	12–1–0 (7–0–0)	Koskinen Stadium (1,504); Durham, NC
October 24; 7:00 p.m., ACCNX	No. 1	No. 7 Notre Dame	T 3–3	12–1–1 (7–0–1)	Koskinen Stadium (1,049); Durham, NC
October 27; 2:00 p.m., ACCNX	No. 1	at No. 2 Wake Forest	W 2–0	13–1–1 (8–0–1)	Spry Stadium (3,761); Winston-Salem, NC
October 31; 7:00 p.m., ACCNX	No. 1	at No. 8 North Carolina; Rivalry	W 3–2	14–1–1 (9–0–1)	Dorrance Field (3,127); Chapel Hill, NC
ACC tournament
November 7; 8:00 p.m., ACCN	(1) No. 1	vs. (4) No. 8 North Carolina; Semifinals, Rivalry	L 1–2	14–2–1	WakeMed Soccer Park (1,492); Cary, NC
NCAA tournament
November 15; 6:00 p.m., ESPN+	(1) No. 1	Howard; First Round	W 8–0	15–2–1	Koskinen Stadium (1,082); Durham, NC
November 22; 6:30 p.m., ESPN+	(1) No. 1	(8) No. 17 Texas Tech; Second Round	W 3–0	16–2–1	Koskinen Stadium (1,364); Durham, NC
November 24; 6:00 p.m., ESPN+	(1) No. 1	(5) No. 16 Michigan State; Round of 16	W 2–0	17–2–1	Koskinen Stadium (1,274); Durham, NC
November 30; 6:00 p.m., ESPN+	(1) No. 1	(7) No. 12 Virginia Tech; Quarterfinals	W 1–0	18–2–1	Koskinen Stadium (1,581); Durham, NC
December 6; 7:30 p.m., ESPNU	(1) No. 1	(2) No. 8 North Carolina; Semifinals, Rivalry	L 0–3	18–3–1	WakeMed Soccer Park (10,333); Cary, NC
*Non-conference game. ^{#}Rankings from United Soccer Coaches. (#) Tournament seedings in parentheses. All times are in Eastern.

== Awards and honors ==
Recipient	Award	Date	Ref.
Kat Rader	Pre-season All-ACC Team	August 8, 2024	
Cameron Roller	ACC Defensive Player of the Week – Week 4	September 10, 2024	
Leah Freeman	ACC Co-Defensive Player of the Week – Week 7	October 1, 2024	
Mia Oliaro	ACC Co-Offensive Player of the Week – Week 8	October 7, 2024	
Maggie Graham	ACC Offensive Player of the Week – Week 9	October 15, 2024	
Robbie Church	ACC Coach of the Year	November 6, 2024	
Maggie Graham	ACC Midfielder of the Year	November 6, 2024	
Cameron Roller	ACC Defensive Player of the Year	November 6, 2024	
Leah Freeman	ACC Goalkeeper of the Year	November 6, 2024	
Maggie Graham	All-ACC First Team	November 6, 2024	
Cameron Roller	All-ACC First Team	November 6, 2024	
Leah Freeman	All-ACC First Team	November 6, 2024	
Hannah Bebar	All-ACC Second Team	November 6, 2024	
Ella Hase	All-ACC Second Team	November 6, 2024	
Mia Oliaro	All-ACC Second Team	November 6, 2024	
Cameron Roller	All-ACC Tournament Team	November 10, 2024	

== Rankings ==
Ranking movements Legend: ██ Increase in ranking ██ Decrease in ranking — = Not ranked RV = Received votes т = Tied with team above or below ( ) = First-place votes
	Week																	
Poll	Pre	1	2	3	4	5	6	7	8	9	10	11	12	13	14	15	16	Final
United Soccer	24	—	RV	—	8	3т	3	2	1 (6)	1 (8)	1 (8)	1 (8)	Not released					3
TopDrawer Soccer	—	—	—	—	21	21	8	5	3	1	1	2	2	5	5	3	3	3
