= 2024 California Golden Bears women's soccer team =

American college soccer season

2024 California Golden Bears women's soccer

NCAA Tournament, Second Round
- Conference: Atlantic Coast Conference
- U. Soc. Coaches poll: No. RV
- Record: 13–6–2 (5–4–1 ACC)
- Head coach: Neil McGuire (18th season)
- Associate head coach: Cori Callahan (14th season)
- Assistant coaches: Alec Sundly (1st season); Rachel Mercik (1st season)
- Home stadium: Edwards Stadium

2024 ACC women's soccer standings
| | Conf. | | | | | | Overall |
| Team | W | | L | | T | PCT | W | | L | | T | PCT |
|---|---|---|---|---|---|---|---|---|---|---|---|---|
| No. 3 Duke ‍†‍‍^{y} | 9 | – | 0 | – | 1 | .950 | 18 | – | 3 | – | 1 | .841 |
| No. 2 Wake Forest ‍‍‍^{y} | 7 | – | 2 | – | 1 | .750 | 16 | – | 4 | – | 4 | .750 |
| No. 13 Florida State ‍‍‡‍^{y} | 7 | – | 2 | – | 1 | .750 | 15 | – | 2 | – | 4 | .810 |
| No. 1 North Carolina ‍‍‍^{y} | 7 | – | 3 | – | 0 | .700 | 22 | – | 5 | – | 0 | .815 |
| No. 7 Virginia Tech ‍‍‍^{y} | 6 | – | 2 | – | 2 | .700 | 14 | – | 6 | – | 3 | .674 |
| No. 6 Notre Dame ‍‍‍^{y} | 5 | – | 1 | – | 4 | .700 | 14 | – | 4 | – | 4 | .727 |
| California ‍‍‍^{y} | 5 | – | 4 | – | 1 | .550 | 13 | – | 6 | – | 2 | .667 |
| No. 4 Stanford ‍‍‍^{y} | 5 | – | 4 | – | 1 | .550 | 16 | – | 5 | – | 2 | .739 |
| Virginia ‍‍‍^{y} | 5 | – | 5 | – | 0 | .500 | 13 | – | 5 | – | 1 | .711 |
| Boston College ‍‍‍ | 4 | – | 4 | – | 2 | .500 | 12 | – | 5 | – | 2 | .684 |
| Pittsburgh ‍‍‍ | 3 | – | 5 | – | 2 | .400 | 9 | – | 6 | – | 3 | .583 |
| Louisville ‍‍‍ | 2 | – | 5 | – | 3 | .350 | 7 | – | 6 | – | 5 | .528 |
| SMU ‍‍‍ | 2 | – | 6 | – | 2 | .300 | 6 | – | 9 | – | 2 | .412 |
| Clemson ‍‍‍ | 2 | – | 7 | – | 1 | .250 | 6 | – | 8 | – | 3 | .441 |
| Miami (FL) ‍‍‍ | 1 | – | 6 | – | 3 | .250 | 5 | – | 8 | – | 4 | .412 |
| NC State ‍‍‍ | 1 | – | 6 | – | 3 | .250 | 4 | – | 10 | – | 4 | .333 |
| Syracuse ‍‍‍ | 0 | – | 9 | – | 1 | .050 | 6 | – | 10 | – | 2 | .389 |
† – Conference champion ‡ – 2024 ACC Tournament champion y – Invited to the NCAA Tournament; As of December 10, 2024; Rankings from United Soccer Coaches Poll; Source: The ACC

The 2024 California Golden Bears women's soccer team represented the University of California, Berkeley during the 2024 NCAA Division I women's soccer season. The Golden Bears were led by head coach Neil McGuire, in his eighteenth season. They played home games at Edwards Stadium in Berkeley, California. This was the team's 42nd season playing organized women's college soccer and their first playing in the Atlantic Coast Conference.

The Golden Bears started the season well, with a 2–1 win over UC San Diego before falling to twenty-second ranked Santa Clara 1–2. Their next game would be a 1–1 draw with Gonzaga, which would also be the last blemish on their non-conference record. They won their next six non-conference games including a dominant 6–1 win over San Francisco and a thrilling 4–3 win over Cal State Bakersfield. They did not play any Power 4 teams during their non-conference season. They started ACC play well, with three wins and a draw. The draw came against thirteenth ranked Wake Forest. After this stretch they entered the rankings at number seventeen. However, their next three games would be against ranked opponents. They lost to second ranked North Carolina, first ranked Duke, and twelfth ranked Notre Dame. The Notre Dame loss was the only one of the three which was not a one-goal affair. After a 2–1 loss to Louisville, they fell out of the rankings. They finished their ACC season with two wins, including a 3–2 win over fourteenth ranked rival Stanford. This was their only win over a ranked team during the season.

The Golden Bears finished the season 13–6–2 overall and 5–4–1 in ACC play to finish in tie for seventh place. They did not qualify for the ACC Tournament. They received an at-large bid to the NCAA Tournament and were unseeded in the Mississippi State Bracket. They defeated seventh seed Pepperdine in the First Round, before falling to second seed Arkansas 1–0 in the Second Round.

== Previous season ==
The Golden Bears finished the season with a 7–6–6 overall record and a 4–3–4 record in Pac-12 play, placing them fifth in the conference. They were not invited to the NCAA Tournament.

== Offseason ==
=== Departures ===
Departures
| Name | Number | Pos. | Height | Year | Hometown | Reason for departure |
|---|---|---|---|---|---|---|
| Makena Smith | 0 | GK | 5'7" | Graduate Student | Murrieta, California | Graduated |
| Kylie Kerr | 6 | DF | 5'7" | Graduate Student | Alamo, California | Graduated |
| Rilee Harmon | 7 | MF | 5'4" | Senior | Corona, California | Graduated |
| Amaya Gray | 11 | FW | 5'3" | Senior | East Palo Alto, California | Graduated |
| Anysa Gray | 17 | FW | 5'2" | Senior | East Palo Alto, California | Graduated |
| Abby Borchers | 22 | FW | 5'4" | Senior | Fresno, California | Graduated |
| Kaylee Nguyen | 28 | MF | 5'4" | Graduate Student | Irvine, California | Graduated |
| Katie Strong | 31 | FW | 5'7" | Freshman | Tracy, California | — |
| Hannah Copper | 32 | FW | 5'7" | Senior | Irvine, California | Graduated |
| Julia Gonsman | 34 | DF | 5'10" | Senior | Pleasanton, California | Graduated |
| Mia Fontana | 39 | FW | 5'6" | Graduate Student | Burlingame, California | Graduated |

=== Incoming transfers ===
Incoming transfers
| Name | Number | Pos. | Height | Year | Hometown | Previous school |
|---|---|---|---|---|---|---|
| Kelly McManus | 00 | GK | 5'11" | Graduate Student | Long Beach, California | UCLA |
| Alex Klos | 17 | MF | 5'8" | Junior | Folsom, California | Santa Clara |
| Julia Leontini | 22 | MF | 5'7" | Graduate Student | Danville, California | Stanford |
| Emily Moberly | 42 | MF | 5'7" | Senior | Windsor, California | Skyline |

=== Recruiting class ===
| Name | Nationality | Hometown | Club | TDS Rating |
|---|---|---|---|---|
| Campbell Carroll; DF | (United States) | Seattle, Washington | Seattle United | 3/5 stars |
| Victoria Jones; MF | (United States) | San Diego, California | So Cal Blues | 3/5 stars |
| Sophia Keel; GK | (United States) | Redondo Beach, California | FC HB Koge | 3/5 stars |
| Kenley Whittaker; FW | (United States) | Wilsonville, Oregon | Northwest Elite | 3/5 stars |

== Squad ==
=== Roster ===
As of January 28, 2025

Note: Flags indicate national team as defined under FIFA eligibility rules; some limited exceptions apply. Players may hold more than one non-FIFA nationality.

| No. | Pos. | Nation | Player |
|---|---|---|---|
| 0 | GK | USA | Sophia Keel |
| 00 | GK | USA | Kelly McManus |
| 1 | GK | USA | Teagan Wy |
| 2 | DF | USA | Aasha McLyn |
| 3 | MF | USA | Mya Daily |
| 4 | MF | USA | Reese Doherty |
| 7 | FW | USA | Mia Fontana |
| 8 | FW | USA | Alexis Wright |
| 9 | FW | USA | Ari Manrique |
| 12 | FW | USA | Karlie Lema |
| 13 | FW | USA | Velize King |
| 14 | DF | USA | Malia McMahon |
| 15 | DF | USA | Cailin Bloom |
| 16 | FW | USA | Soleil Dimry |
| 17 | MF | USA | Alex Klos |
| 18 | GK | USA | Maddie Gambs |

| No. | Pos. | Nation | Player |
|---|---|---|---|
| 19 | DF | USA | Courtney Boone |
| 20 | MF | USA | Kei Kitamura |
| 21 | FW | USA | Jordyn Young |
| 22 | MF | USA | Julia Leontini |
| 23 | MF | USA | Lizzie Vranesh |
| 24 | DF | USA | Summer Starsiak |
| 25 | MF | USA | Campbell Carroll |
| 26 | DF | GER | Miriam Hils |
| 28 | MF | USA | Victoria Jones |
| 29 | DF | USA | Skylar Briggs |
| 30 | FW | USA | Aaliyah Schinaman |
| 32 | FW | USA | Kenley Whittaker |
| 36 | MF | USA | Coco Thistle |
| 39 | MF | USA | Noelle Bond-Flasza |
| 40 | DF | USA | Archer Streelman |
| 42 | MF | USA | Emily Moberly |

=== Team management ===
| Position | Staff |
|---|---|
| Head coach | Neil McGuire |
| Associate Head Coach | Cori Callahan |
| Assistant Coach | Alec Sundly |
| Assistant Coach | Rachel Merick |

== Schedule ==
| Date Time, TV | Rank^{#} | Opponent^{#} | Result | Record | Site (Attendance) City, State |
Exhibition
| August 10*; 1:00 p.m. | | at Saint Mary's | W 2–0 | — | Saint Mary's Stadium; Moraga, CA |
Non-Conference regular season
| August 15*; 4:00 p.m., ACCNX | | UC San Diego | W 2–1 | 1–0–0 | Edwards Stadium (123); Berkeley, CA |
| August 18*; 1:00 p.m., ESPN+ | | at No. 22 Santa Clara | L 1–2 | 1–1–0 | Stevens Stadium (735); Santa Clara, CA |
| August 22*; 4:30 p.m., ACCNX | | Gonzaga | T 1–1 | 1–1–1 | Edwards Stadium (173); Berkeley, CA |
| August 25*; 8:00 p.m., ESPN+ | | at San Francisco | W 6–1 | 2–1–1 | Negoesco Stadium (212); San Francisco, CA |
| August 29*; 4:00 p.m., ACCNX | | Cal State Fullteron | W 1–0 | 3–1–1 | Edwards Stadium (154); Berkeley, CA |
| September 1*; 1:00 p.m., ACCNX | | at Cal State Bakersfield | W 4–3 | 4–1–1 | Edwards Stadium (568); Berkeley, CA |
| September 5*; 2:00 p.m., ACCNX | | Nevada | W 4–1 | 5–1–1 | Edwards Stadium (129); Berkeley, CA |
| September 8*; 2:00 p.m., ACCNX | | San Diego | W 3–0 | 6–1–1 | Edwards Stadium (455); Berkeley, CA |
| September 12*; 4:00 p.m., ACCNX | | Saint Mary's | W 2–1 | 7–1–1 | Edwards Stadium (198); Berkeley, CA |
ACC Regular season
| September 19; 4:00 p.m., ACCNX | | at NC State | W 3–1 | 8–1–1 (1–0–0) | Dail Soccer Field (407); Raleigh, NC |
| September 22; 9:00 a.m., ACCN | | at No. 13 Wake Forest | T 2–2 | 8–1–2 (1–0–1) | Spry Stadium (855); Winston-Salem, NC |
| September 26; 4:00 p.m., ACCNX | | Pittsburgh | W 1–0 | 9–1–2 (2–0–1) | Edwards Stadium (212); Berkeley, CA |
| September 29; 1:00 p.m., ACCNX | | Miami | W 3–2 | 10–1–2 (3–0–1) | Edwards Stadium (664); Berkeley, CA |
| October 10; 4:00 p.m., ACCNX | No. 17 | No. 2 North Carolina | L 0–1 | 10–2–2 (3–1–1) | Edwards Stadium (688); Berkeley, CA |
| October 13; 1:00 p.m., ACCNX | No. 17 | No. 1 Duke | L 1–2 | 10–3–2 (3–2–1) | Edwards Stadium (1,389); Berkeley, CA |
| October 17; 4:00 p.m., ACCNX | No. 25 | at No. 12 Notre Dame | L 2–5 | 10–4–2 (3–3–1) | Alumni Stadium (415); Notre Dame, IN |
| October 20; 9:00 a.m., ACCN | No. 25 | at Louisville | L 1–2 | 10–5–2 (3–4–1) | Lynn Stadium (450); Louisville, KY |
| October 27; 12:00 p.m., ACCNX | | SMU | W 3–2 | 11–5–2 (4–4–1) | Edwards Stadium (1,233); Berkeley, CA |
| October 31; 7:00 p.m., ACCNX | | at No. 14т Stanford | W 3–2 | 12–5–2 (5–4–1) | Cagan Stadium (1,561); Stanford, CA |
NCAA Tournament
| November 16; 12:00 p.m., ESPN+ | | at (7) No. 22т Pepperdine; First Round | W 2–1 ^{2OT} | 13–5–2 | Tari Frahm Rokus Field (626); Malibu, CA |
| November 22; 4:30 p.m., ESPN+ | | at (2) No. 5 Arkansas; Second Round | L 0–1 | 13–6–2 | Razorback Field (1,701); Fayetteville, AR |
*Non-conference game. ^{#}Rankings from United Soccer Coaches. (#) Tournament seedings in parentheses. All times are in Pacific.

== Awards and honors ==
| Recipient | Award | Date | Ref. |
|---|---|---|---|
| Teagan Wy | Pre-season All-ACC Team | August 8, 2024 | |
| Karlie Lema | ACC Offensive Player of the Week | September 10, 2024 | |
| Karlie Lema | ACC Offensive Player of the Year | November 6, 2024 | |
| Karlie Lema | All-ACC First Team | November 6, 2024 | |
| Teagan Wy | All-ACC Second Team | November 6, 2024 | |

== Rankings ==
Ranking movements Legend: ██ Increase in ranking ██ Decrease in ranking — = Not ranked RV = Received votes
| | Week | | | | | | | | | | | | | | | | | |
| Poll | Pre | 1 | 2 | 3 | 4 | 5 | 6 | 7 | 8 | 9 | 10 | 11 | 12 | 13 | 14 | 15 | 16 | Final |
|---|---|---|---|---|---|---|---|---|---|---|---|---|---|---|---|---|---|---|
| United Soccer | — | — | — | — | — | — | RV | 18 | 17 | 25 | — | — | Not released | | | | | RV |
| TopDrawer Soccer | — | — | — | — | — | — | 22 | 13 | 10 | 10 | — | — | — | — | 25 | — | — | — |
