= 2024 SMU Mustangs women's soccer team =

American college soccer season

2024 SMU Mustangs women's soccer
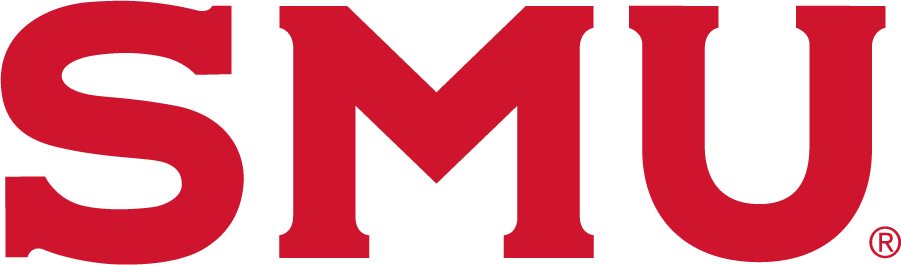
- Conference: Atlantic Coast Conference
- Record: 6–9–2 (2–6–2 ACC)
- Head coach: Nicole Nelson (3rd season)
- Associate head coach: Mat Cosgriff (11th season)
- Assistant coaches: Miles Vaughn (1st season); Courtney Sebazco (1st season)
- Home stadium: Washburne Stadium

2024 ACC women's soccer standings
	Conf.						Overall
Team	W		L		T	PCT	W		L		T	PCT
No. 3 Duke ‍†‍‍^{y}	9	–	0	–	1	.950	18	–	3	–	1	.841
No. 2 Wake Forest ‍‍‍^{y}	7	–	2	–	1	.750	16	–	4	–	4	.750
No. 13 Florida State ‍‍‡‍^{y}	7	–	2	–	1	.750	15	–	2	–	4	.810
No. 1 North Carolina ‍‍‍^{y}	7	–	3	–	0	.700	22	–	5	–	0	.815
No. 7 Virginia Tech ‍‍‍^{y}	6	–	2	–	2	.700	14	–	6	–	3	.674
No. 6 Notre Dame ‍‍‍^{y}	5	–	1	–	4	.700	14	–	4	–	4	.727
California ‍‍‍^{y}	5	–	4	–	1	.550	13	–	6	–	2	.667
No. 4 Stanford ‍‍‍^{y}	5	–	4	–	1	.550	16	–	5	–	2	.739
Virginia ‍‍‍^{y}	5	–	5	–	0	.500	13	–	5	–	1	.711
Boston College ‍‍‍	4	–	4	–	2	.500	12	–	5	–	2	.684
Pittsburgh ‍‍‍	3	–	5	–	2	.400	9	–	6	–	3	.583
Louisville ‍‍‍	2	–	5	–	3	.350	7	–	6	–	5	.528
SMU ‍‍‍	2	–	6	–	2	.300	6	–	9	–	2	.412
Clemson ‍‍‍	2	–	7	–	1	.250	6	–	8	–	3	.441
Miami (FL) ‍‍‍	1	–	6	–	3	.250	5	–	8	–	4	.412
NC State ‍‍‍	1	–	6	–	3	.250	4	–	10	–	4	.333
Syracuse ‍‍‍	0	–	9	–	1	.050	6	–	10	–	2	.389
† – Conference champion ‡ – 2024 ACC Tournament champion y – Invited to the NCAA Tournament; As of December 10, 2024; Rankings from United Soccer Coaches Poll; Source: The ACC

The 2024 SMU Mustangs women's soccer team represented Southern Methodist University during the 2024 NCAA Division I women's soccer season. The Mustangs were led by head coach Nicole Nelson, in her third season. They played their home games at Washburne Stadium in Dallas, Texas. This was the team's 31st season playing organized women's college soccer and their 1st playing in the Atlantic Coast Conference.

The Mustangs started the season with two wins over non-Power 5 opponents before losing to twelfth ranked Texas. They defeated two more non-Power 5 opponents before losing their final two non-conference games to Big 12 opponents TCU and Baylor. The Mustangs finished the non-conference season 4–3–0. They started their initial ACC season with two wins over Syracuse and Boston College. They then tied Miami (FL) before facing a ranked opponent in their next six straight matches. They began this stretch with a 1–1 tie against then number 2 Florida State. They lost the remaining five games against ranked opponents. Four of the losses game by just one goal, with the exception being a 3–0 loss against third ranked Duke. The finished their season with a 3–2 loss against California.

The Mustangs finished the season 6–9–2 overall and 2–6–2 in ACC play to finish in thirteenth place. They did not qualify for the ACC Tournament and were not invited to the NCAA Tournament. Their six overall wins were the lowest since 2015, with the exception of a shortened 2020 season.

== Previous season ==
The Mustangs finished the season 11–6–1 overall and 5–3–1 in AAC to finish in second place in the West Division. As the third seed in the AAC Tournament they defeated sixth-seed Tulsa in the First Round and seventh-seed Florida Atlantic in the Semifinals. They could not overcome nationally ranked Memphis and lost 1–2 in the Final. They were not invited to the NCAA Tournament.

== Offseason ==
=== Departures ===
Departures
Name	Number	Pos.	Height	Year	Hometown	Reason for departure
Samantha Estrada	0	GK	6'0"	Graduate Student	El Paso, Texas	Graduated
Tatum Sutherland	1	GK	5'6"	(redshirt) Senior	Cleburne, Texas	Graduated
Bo Rubinstein	4	FW	5'8"	Senior	Warren, Vermont	Graduated
Treasure Byars	7	MF	5'0"	Freshman	Richardson, Texas	Transferred to UT Dallas
Wayny Balata	10	MF	5'8"	Graduate Student	Montreal, Quebec	Graduated
Abby Dermott	15	DF	5'6"	Senior	Oak Park, California	Graduated
Peyton Annen	18	DF	5'10"	Sophomore	Plano, Texas	Transferred to Texas Tech
Alana Karro	20	MF	5'3"	Senior	Newport Beach, California	Graduated
Leah Chancey	21	MF	5'6"	Senior	Ovilla, Texas	Graduated
Hannah Wrigley	30	GK	5'6"	Junior	Lewisville, Texas	—

=== Incoming transfers ===
Incoming transfers
Name	Number	Pos.	Height	Year	Hometown	Previous school
Haven Empey	0	GK	5'11"	Junior	American Fork, Utah	BYU
Hali Hartman	4	DF	5'7"	Junior	Grand Prairie, Texas	LSU
Nanami Hata	13	DF/MF	5'6"	Junior	Shizuoka, Japan	Iowa Western
Lou Brossault	20	MF	5'6"	Junior	Rennes, France	Iowa Western
Sierra Cota-Yarde	30	GK	5'11"	Graduate Student	Toronto, Canada	Arkansas
Jessi Curry	44	GK	5'11"	Sophomore	Farmington, New Mexico	Tyler JC

=== Recruiting class ===
Name	Nationality	Hometown	Club	TDS Rating
Paxton Bock; DF	(United States)	Scottsdale, Arizona	Utah Royals (AZ)	3/5 stars
Elizabeth Eddy; MF	(United States)	McKinney, Texas	FC Dallas	3/5 stars
Kelly Gordon; MF	(United States)	Asheville, North Carolina	Carolina Elite Soccer Academy	3/5 stars
Sadie Paul; FW	(United States)	Fort Worth, Texas	IMG Academy	3/5 stars
Nicole Stryker; MF	(United States)	Loomis, California	IMG Academy	N/A
Lydia Ungashick; MF	(United States)	Overland Park, Kansas	Sporting Blue Valley SC	3/5 stars

== Squad ==
=== Roster ===
As of December 18, 2024

Note: Flags indicate national team as defined under FIFA eligibility rules; some limited exceptions apply. Players may hold more than one non-FIFA nationality.

No.	Pos.	Nation	Player
1	GK	USA	Aubrey Brown
2	MF	USA	Kaya Lee
3	MF	JPN	Mayu Inokawa
4	DF	USA	Hali Hartman
5	FW	USA	Truth Byars
6	DF	USA	Sammy Nieves
8	MF	USA	Mackenzie Rudden
9	FW	USA	Eliana Salama
11	MF	USA	Addison Vali
12	DF	USA	Paxton Bock
13	DF	JPN	Nanami Hata
14	FW	USA	Liz Eddy
15	MF	USA	Lydia Ungashick
16	MF	USA	Kelly Gordon
17	DF	USA	Tori Peterson
19	FW	CAN	Nyah Rose

No.	Pos.	Nation	Player
20	MF	FRA	Lou Brossault
21	FW	USA	Sadie Paul
22	MF	USA	Nicole Stryker
24	FW	USA	Emma Alvord
25	DF	USA	Sophie King
26	MF	MEX	Layla Garica-Moreno
27	DF	USA	Abby Hampton
28	DF	USA	Bella Burr
30	GK	POR	Sierra Cota-Yarde
31	DF	USA	Paige Boeger
32	MF	USA	Maura Yumul
34	FW	USA	Jen Jackson
35	FW	ENG	Hayden Halscheid
44	GK	USA	Jessi Curry
66	GK	USA	Haven Empey

=== Team management ===
Position	Staff
Head coach	Nicole Nelson
Associate Head Coach	Mat Cosgriff
Assistant Coach	Miles Vaughn
Assistant Coach	Courtney Sebazco
Director of Operations	Paula Woodbury

== Schedule ==
Date Time, TV	Rank^{#}	Opponent^{#}	Result	Record	Site (Attendance) City, State
Non-conference regular season
August 15*; 7:00 p.m., ACCNX		Northwestern State	W 3–0	1–0–0	Washburne Stadium (480); Dallas, TX
August 18*; 7:00 p.m., ACCNX		Texas Southern	W 6–0	2–0–0	Washburne Stadium (313); Dallas, TX
August 22*; 7:00 p.m., ACCNX		No. 12 Texas	L 3–6	2–1–0	Washburne Stadium (1,761); Dallas, TX
August 25*; 8:30 p.m., ACCNX		Stephen F. Austin	W 3–2	3–1–0	Washburne Stadium (1,358); Dallas, TX
August 29*; 6:00 p.m., ACCNX		Little Rock	W 2–0	4–1–0	Washburne Stadium; Dallas, TX
September 1*; 8:30 p.m., ACCNX		TCU	L 0–1	4–2–0	Washburne Stadium (1,087); Dallas, TX
September 5*; 7:00 p.m., ACCNX		Baylor	L 1–2	4–3–0	Washburne Stadium (733); Dallas, TX
ACC Regular season
September 12; 7:00 p.m., ACCNX		Syracuse	W 4–1	5–3–0 (1–0–0)	Washburne Stadium (412); Dallas, TX
September 15; 1:00 p.m., ACCN		Boston College	W 2–0	6–3–0 (2–0–0)	Washburne Stadium (526); Dallas, TX
September 19; 6:00 p.m., ACCNX		at Miami (FL)	T 3–3	6–3–1 (2–0–1)	Cobb Stadium (315); Coral Gables, FL
September 22; 1:00 p.m., ACCN		No. 2 Florida State	T 1–1	6–3–2 (2–0–2)	Washburne Stadium (710); Dallas, TX
September 27; 6:00 p.m., ACCNX		at No. 3 Duke	L 0–3	6–4–2 (2–1–2)	Koskinen Stadium (397); Durham, NC
October 5; 7:00 p.m., ACCNX		No. 9 Stanford	L 1–2	6–5–2 (2–2–2)	Washburne Stadium (1,037); Dallas, TX
October 10; 6:00 p.m., ACCNX		at No. 21 Virginia Tech	L 0–1	6–6–2 (2–3–2)	Thompson Field (840); Blacksburg, VA
October 13; 12:00 p.m., ACCNX		No. 25 Virginia	L 1–2	6–7–2 (2–4–2)	Klöckner Stadium (1,405); Charlottesville, VA
October 19; 7:00 p.m., ACCNX		No. 2 Wake Forest	L 1–2	6–8–2 (2–5–2)	Washburne Stadium (933); Dallas, TX
October 27; 2:00 p.m., ACCNX		at California	L 2–3	6–9–2 (2–6–2)	Edwards Stadium (1,233); Berkeley, CA
*Non-conference game. ^{#}Rankings from United Soccer Coaches. (#) Tournament seedings in parentheses. All times are in Central.

== Awards and honors ==
Recipient	Award	Date	Ref.
Nyah Rose	All-ACC Third Team	November 6, 2024	

== Rankings ==
Ranking movements Legend: — = Not ranked
	Week																	
Poll	Pre	1	2	3	4	5	6	7	8	9	10	11	12	13	14	15	16	Final
United Soccer	—	—	—	—	—	—	—	—	—	—	—	—	Not released					—
TopDrawer Soccer	—	—	—	—	—	—	—	—	—	—	—	—	—	—	—	—	—	—
