= 2024 Louisville Cardinals women's soccer team =

2024 Louisville Cardinals women's soccer
- Conference: Atlantic Coast Conference
- Record: 7–6–5 (2–5–3 ACC)
- Head coach: Karen Ferguson-Dayes (25th season)
- Assistant coaches: Hunter Norton (9th season); Olivia Mills (1st season)
- Home stadium: Lynn Stadium

2024 ACC women's soccer standings
	Conf.						Overall
Team	W		L		T	PCT	W		L		T	PCT
No. 3 Duke ‍†‍‍^{y}	9	–	0	–	1	.950	18	–	3	–	1	.841
No. 2 Wake Forest ‍‍‍^{y}	7	–	2	–	1	.750	16	–	4	–	4	.750
No. 13 Florida State ‍‍‡‍^{y}	7	–	2	–	1	.750	15	–	2	–	4	.810
No. 1 North Carolina ‍‍‍^{y}	7	–	3	–	0	.700	22	–	5	–	0	.815
No. 7 Virginia Tech ‍‍‍^{y}	6	–	2	–	2	.700	14	–	6	–	3	.674
No. 6 Notre Dame ‍‍‍^{y}	5	–	1	–	4	.700	14	–	4	–	4	.727
California ‍‍‍^{y}	5	–	4	–	1	.550	13	–	6	–	2	.667
No. 4 Stanford ‍‍‍^{y}	5	–	4	–	1	.550	16	–	5	–	2	.739
Virginia ‍‍‍^{y}	5	–	5	–	0	.500	13	–	5	–	1	.711
Boston College ‍‍‍	4	–	4	–	2	.500	12	–	5	–	2	.684
Pittsburgh ‍‍‍	3	–	5	–	2	.400	9	–	6	–	3	.583
Louisville ‍‍‍	2	–	5	–	3	.350	7	–	6	–	5	.528
SMU ‍‍‍	2	–	6	–	2	.300	6	–	9	–	2	.412
Clemson ‍‍‍	2	–	7	–	1	.250	6	–	8	–	3	.441
Miami (FL) ‍‍‍	1	–	6	–	3	.250	5	–	8	–	4	.412
NC State ‍‍‍	1	–	6	–	3	.250	4	–	10	–	4	.333
Syracuse ‍‍‍	0	–	9	–	1	.050	6	–	10	–	2	.389
† – Conference champion ‡ – 2024 ACC Tournament champion y – Invited to the NCAA Tournament; As of December 10, 2024; Rankings from United Soccer Coaches Poll; Source: The ACC

The 2024 Louisville Cardinals women's soccer team represented University of Louisville during the 2024 NCAA Division I women's soccer season. The Cardinals were led by head coach Karen Ferguson-Dayes, in her twenty-fifth season. They played home games at Lynn Stadium. This was the team's 40th season playing organized women's college soccer and their 11th playing in the Atlantic Coast Conference.

The Cardinals started the season by winning their first two games before drawing with New Hampshire. They won three of their next four non-conference games, with the other game being a draw against Cincinnati, their only Power 4 opponent of the non-conference season. They ended their non-conference slate, with a loss to Dayton to finish that portion of the season 5–1–2. They began the ACC season with two straight losses, to Pittsburgh and Virginia Tech. They then defeated NC State for their first ACC win of the season. The Cardinal's next five games would all be against ranked opponents, and they would go 1–3–1 over that stretch. They lost to number 3 North Carolina, number 2 Duke, and number 6 Stanford. They earned a 0–0 draw with number thirteen Notre Dame and defeated number 25 California. They finished the season with two 0–0 draws to finish their ACC slate 2–5–3.

The Cardinals finished the season 7–6–5 overall and 2–5–3 in ACC play to finish in twelfth place. The team did not qualify for the ACC Tournament and were not invited to the NCAA Tournament. Their seven wins were an improvement on the previous year, but they had one fewer ACC win. This was the fifth straight year they did not qualify for the NCAA Tournament.

== Previous season ==
The Cardinals finished the season 4–9–5 overall and 3–5–2 in ACC play to finish in ninth place. The team did not qualify for the ACC Tournament and were not invited to the NCAA Tournament. Their four overall wins, were the lowest for the team since 2001. Their three conference wins matched their total in the last two years.

== Offseason ==
=== Departures ===
Departures
Name	Number	Pos.	Height	Year	Hometown	Reason for Departure
Malene Nielsen	0	GK	5'11"	Junior	Juelsminde, Denmark	Transferred to St. John's
Alyssa Zalac	1	GK	5'9"	(redshirt) Sophomore	Montreal, Canada	Transferred to Creighton
Emma Hiscock	4	FW	5'4"	Senior	Fenton, Michigan	Graduated
Ravin Alexander	5	FW	5'3"	Graduate Student	Cincinnati, Ohio	Graduated
Lucy Roberts	6	DF	5'10"	Graduate Student	Crewe, England	Graduated
Autumn Weeks	10	DF	5'7"	Graduate Student	East Peoria, Illinois	Graduated
Addie Chester	11	MF	5'7"	Sophomore	Muncie, Indiana	Transferred to Ball State
Hayley Howard	15	MF	5'9"	Junior	Brentwood, Tennessee	Transferred to Tennessee
Fiona Gaißer	19	FW	5'5"	Freshman	Munich, Germany	Signed professional contract with FC Carl Zeiss Jena
Savina Zamborini	20	MF	5'7"	Senior	Louisville, Kentucky	Graduated
Morgan Bentley	23	MF	5'4"	Senior	Atlanta, Georgia	Graduated
Maddy Ellsworth	32	DF	5'7"	Senior	Hillsboro, Oregon	Graduated

=== Incoming transfers ===
Incoming transfers
Name	Number	Pos.	Height	Year	Hometown	Previous School
Kailey Kimball	1	GK	6'2"	Junior	Danville, California	Purdue
Jolie St. Louis	4	FW	5'9"	Senior	Atlanta, Georgia	UAB
Berkley Patterson	15	MF	5'6"	Sophomore	Austin, Texas	Texas Tech
Gianna Angelillo	21	MF	5'6"	Sophomore	Glastonbury, Connecticut	Miami (FL)
Ella Kane	23	FW	5'5"	Sophomore	Macomb, Michigan	Kentucky

=== Recruiting class ===
Name	Nationality	Hometown	Club	TDS Rating
Lauryn Contini; MF	(United States)	New Philadelphia, Ohio	Cleveland Force SC	3/5 stars
Piper Davidson; FW	(United States)	Wenatchee, Washington	Crossfire Premier FC	3/5 stars
Fina Davy; FW	(United States)	Delaware, Ohio	Ohio Premier	N/A
Ag Gibson; MF	(United States)	Louisville, Kentucky	Racing Louisville FC Academy	3/5 stars
Brooklyn Lee; DF	(United States)	Tacoma, Washington	Pacific NW	3/5 stars
Grace Maddox; FW	(United States)	Statham, Georgia	GSA	3/5 stars
Avery Oergel; DF	(United States)	Fulton, Maryland	Maryland United FC	3/5 stars
Amelia Swinarski; MF	(United States)	Madison, Ohio	Internationals SC, Ohio	3/5 stars

== Squad ==
=== Roster ===
As of December 30, 2024

Note: Flags indicate national team as defined under FIFA eligibility rules; some limited exceptions apply. Players may hold more than one non-FIFA nationality.

No.	Pos.	Nation	Player
1	GK	USA	Kailey Kimball
2	MF	USA	Betsy Huckaby
3	FW	USA	Mackenzie Geigle
4	FW	USA	Jolie St. Louis
5	FW	USA	Grace Maddox
6	FW	USA	Piper Davidson
7	FW	USA	Amber Jackson
8	MF	USA	Maya Maxwell
9	MF	USA	Molly Cochran
10	MF	USA	Lauryn Contini
11	MF	USA	Amelia Swinarski
12	DF	USA	Avery Oergel
13	MF	USA	Ava Nielson
14	MF	USA	Lizzie Sexton

No.	Pos.	Nation	Player
15	MF	USA	Berkley Patterson
17	DF	USA	Brooklyn Lee
18	MF	DEN	Wiktoria Wik
20	FW	USA	Fina Davy
21	MF	USA	Gianna Angelillo
22	DF	USA	Karsyn Cherry
23	FW	USA	Ella Kane
24	MF	USA	AG Gibson
25	DF	USA	Hadley Snyder
26	MF	USA	Emma Kate Schroll
27	FW	USA	Emersen Jennings
28	MF	USA	Brooke Dardano
30	GK	USA	Erynn Floyd

=== Team management ===
Position	Staff
Karen Ferguson-Dayes	Head coach
Hunter Norton	Associate Head Coach
Olivia Mills	Assistant Coach
Jing Hughley	Director of Operations
Declan Doherty	Performance Analyst

== Schedule ==
Date Time, TV	Rank^{#}	Opponent^{#}	Result	Record	Site (Attendance) City, State
Exhibition
August 8*; 4:00 p.m.		at Eastern Kentucky	None Reported	–	EKU Soccer Field; Richmond, KY
Non-conference regular season
August 15*; 7:30 p.m., ACCNX		Bellarmine	W 7–0	1–0–0	Lynn Stadium (425); Louisville, KY
August 18*; 7:30 p.m., ACCNX		UAB	W 3–1	2–0–0	Lynn Stadium (286); Louisville, KY
August 22*; 7:30 p.m., ACCNX		New Hampshire	T 1–1	2–0–1	Lynn Stadium (300); Louisville, KY
August 25*; 5:00 p.m., ESPN+		at Northern Kentucky	W 2–1	3–0–1	NKU Soccer Stadium (473); Highland Heights, KY
August 29*; 7:00 p.m., ESPN+		at Cincinnati	T 1–1	3–0–2	Gettler Stadium (803); Cincinnati, OH
September 1*; 7:00 p.m., ACCNX		Evansville	W 3–0	4–0–2	Lynn Stadium (327); Louisville, KY
September 5*; 7:30 p.m., ACCNX		UT Martin	W 2–0	5–0–2	Lynn Stadium (575); Louisville, KY
September 8*; 7:00 p.m., ACCNX		Dayton	L 1–0	5–1–2	Lynn Stadium (203); Louisville, KY
ACC Regular Season
September 14; 7:00 p.m., ACCNX		at Pittsburgh	L 1–3	5–2–2 (0–1–0)	Ambrose Urbanic Field (888); Pittsburgh, PA
September 26; 7:00 p.m., ACCN		at Virginia Tech	L 1–5	5–3–2 (0–2–0)	Thompson Field (273); Blacksburg, VA
September 29; 1:00 p.m., ACCNX		NC State	W 1–0	6–3–2 (1–2–0)	Lynn Stadium (250); Louisville, KY
October 3; 7:00 p.m., ACCNX		at No. 3 North Carolina	L 0–5	6–4–2 (1–3–0)	Dorrance Field (2,012); Chapel Hill, NC
October 6; 2:00 p.m., ACCNX		at No. 2 Duke	L 1–3	6–5–2 (1–4–0)	Koskinen Stadium (690); Durham, NC
October 12; 5:00 p.m., ACCNX		No. 13 Notre Dame	T 0–0	6–5–3 (1–4–1)	Lynn Stadium (375); Louisville, KY
October 17; 7:00 p.m., ACCN		No. 6 Stanford	L 0–1	6–6–3 (1–5–1)	Lynn Stadium (325); Louisville, KY
October 20; 12:00 p.m., ACCN		No. 25 California	W 2–1	7–6–3 (2–5–1)	Lynn Stadium (450); Louisville, KY
October 24; 7:00 p.m., ACCNX		Boston College	T 0–0	7–6–4 (2–5–2)	Lynn Stadium (375); Louisville, KY
October 31; 7:00 p.m., ACCNX		at Clemson	T 0–0	7–6–5 (2–5–3)	Riggs Field (1,174); Clemson, SC
*Non-conference game. ^{#}Rankings from United Soccer Coaches. (#) Tournament seedings in parentheses.

== Awards and honors ==
Recipient	Award	Date	Ref.
Erynn Floyd	ACC Defensive Player of the Week – Week 9	October 15, 2024	

== Rankings ==
Ranking movements Legend: — = Not ranked
	Week																	
Poll	Pre	1	2	3	4	5	6	7	8	9	10	11	12	13	14	15	16	Final
United Soccer	—	—	—	—	—	—	—	—	—	—	—	—	Not released					—
TopDrawer Soccer	—	—	—	—	—	—	—	—	—	—	—	—	—	—	—	—	—	—
