= 2024 Boston College Eagles women's soccer team =

American college soccer season

2024 Boston College Eagles women's soccer
- Conference: Atlantic Coast Conference
- Record: 12–5–2 (4–4–2 ACC)
- Head coach: Chris Watkins (1st season)
- Assistant coaches: Whitney Pitalo (1st season); Stephanie Demake (2nd season); Andrea Morrow (1st season)
- Captains: Sarai Costello; Emily Sapienza; Wiebke Willebrandt
- Home stadium: Newton Campus Soccer Field

2024 ACC women's soccer standings
	Conf.						Overall
Team	W		L		T	PCT	W		L		T	PCT
No. 3 Duke ‍†‍‍^{y}	9	–	0	–	1	.950	18	–	3	–	1	.841
No. 2 Wake Forest ‍‍‍^{y}	7	–	2	–	1	.750	16	–	4	–	4	.750
No. 13 Florida State ‍‍‡‍^{y}	7	–	2	–	1	.750	15	–	2	–	4	.810
No. 1 North Carolina ‍‍‍^{y}	7	–	3	–	0	.700	22	–	5	–	0	.815
No. 7 Virginia Tech ‍‍‍^{y}	6	–	2	–	2	.700	14	–	6	–	3	.674
No. 6 Notre Dame ‍‍‍^{y}	5	–	1	–	4	.700	14	–	4	–	4	.727
California ‍‍‍^{y}	5	–	4	–	1	.550	13	–	6	–	2	.667
No. 4 Stanford ‍‍‍^{y}	5	–	4	–	1	.550	16	–	5	–	2	.739
Virginia ‍‍‍^{y}	5	–	5	–	0	.500	13	–	5	–	1	.711
Boston College ‍‍‍	4	–	4	–	2	.500	12	–	5	–	2	.684
Pittsburgh ‍‍‍	3	–	5	–	2	.400	9	–	6	–	3	.583
Louisville ‍‍‍	2	–	5	–	3	.350	7	–	6	–	5	.528
SMU ‍‍‍	2	–	6	–	2	.300	6	–	9	–	2	.412
Clemson ‍‍‍	2	–	7	–	1	.250	6	–	8	–	3	.441
Miami (FL) ‍‍‍	1	–	6	–	3	.250	5	–	8	–	4	.412
NC State ‍‍‍	1	–	6	–	3	.250	4	–	10	–	4	.333
Syracuse ‍‍‍	0	–	9	–	1	.050	6	–	10	–	2	.389
† – Conference champion ‡ – 2024 ACC Tournament champion y – Invited to the NCAA Tournament; As of December 10, 2024; Rankings from United Soccer Coaches Poll; Source: The ACC

The 2024 Boston College Eagles women's soccer team represented Boston College during the 2024 NCAA Division I women's soccer season. The Eagles were led by head coach Chris Watkins, in his first season. They played home games at Newton Campus Soccer Field. This was the team's 44th season playing organized women's college soccer, and their 20th playing in the Atlantic Coast Conference.

At the end of the previous season, head coach Jason Lowe was fired after five season with the team. Chris Watkins was hired as his replacement on December 14, 2023.

The Eagles started Watkins' inaugural season well, winning their first five straight games, including games where the scored five goals (against Merrimack) and six (against LIU). They lost their first game on September first against UMass. They would win their final two games before ACC play began and entered the conference season with a 7–1–0 record. Their first ACC game was a tie against thirteenth ranked Notre Dame. They followed that with a loss to SMU and a win in their final non-conference game against Grambling State. They went on to win their next two ACC games before a three game losing streak. They suffered losses to two ranked teams, twenty-second ranked Florida State and first-ranked Duke. The Duke loss was a bit of a low point in the season as they lost 7–0. They rebounded with a tie against Louisville and wins in their final two games of the season.

The Eagles finished the season 12–5–2 overall and 4–4–2 in ACC play to finish in tenth place. They did not qualify for the ACC Tournament and were not invited to the NCAA Tournament. Their twelve total wins were the most since 2018, a season prior to when Jason Lowe took over the program. Their four ACC wins were also the best since 2018. By not qualifying for the NCAA tournament, they extended their streak of not qualifying to six seasons.

== Previous season ==
The Eagles finished the season 3–9–6 overall and 0–6–4 in ACC play to finish in thirteenth place. They did not qualify for the ACC Tournament and were not invited to the NCAA Tournament. Their three total wins was tied for lowest in program history with a shortened 2020 season. Their six draw were a program record, beating out the 5 draws in 2022.

== Offseason ==
=== Departures ===
Departures
Name	Number	Pos.	Height	Year	Hometown	Reason for departure
Eva Nahas	2	GK	5'8"	Junior	Atlanta, Georgia	—
Sonia Walk	5	MF	5'6"	Senior	Toronto, Canada	Graduated
Claire Mensi	7	DF	6'0"	Graduate Student	Katonah, New York	Graduated
Laura Gouvin	8	MF	5'6"	Senior	Monson, Massachusetts	Graduated, Transferred to Colorado
Hanna Schmelzle	11	MF	5'6"	Freshman	Leipzig, Germany	—
Riley Kerber	12	MF	5'6"	Sophomore	Medina, Ohio	Transferred to Dayton
Ava Feeley	13	FW	5'10"	Freshman	Yarmouth, Maine	Transferred to Bryant
Jada Tuffin	17	DF	5'11"	Freshman	Pembroke Pines, Florida	—
Reilly Johnson	18	MF	5'3"	Sophomore	Wilmington, North Carolina	—
Ragna Magnúsdóttir	20	DF	5'8"	Sophomore	Vestmannaeyjar, Iceland	—
Maddie Landers	23	MF	5'7"	Freshman	North Andover, Massachusetts	Transferred to Miami (FL)
Caroline Walbridge	27	DF	5'9"	Sophomore	Hanover, Massachusetts	—
Kenna Thomas	30	DF	5'5"	Sophomore	Simi Valley, California	—

=== Incoming transfers ===
Incoming transfers
Name	Number	Pos.	Height	Year	Hometown	Previous school
Ava Lung	11	FW	5'9"	Graduate Student	Westwood, Massachusetts	Harvard
Baylor Goldthwaite	20	MF	5'5"	Junior	Durham, North Carolina	Wake Forest
Grace Courter	23	DF	5'11"	Senior	Bellevue, Washington	Gonzaga
Paige Peltier	24	FW	5'11"	Graduate Student	Hastings, Minnesota	Notre Dame
Faith Fenwick	33	GK	5'8"	Sophomore	Markham, Ontario	Gonzaga

=== Recruiting class ===
Name	Nationality	Hometown	Club	TDS Rating
Shea Boyle; DF	(United States)	Manchester, Connecticut	FC Stars of Massachusetts	3/5 stars
Maya Cheeseboro; GK	(United States)	Bethesda, Maryland	Bethesda SC	3/5 stars
Georgina Clarke; MF	(United States)	Hopkinton, Massachusetts	FC Stars of Massachusetts	3/5 stars
Amalia Dray; DF	(United States)	Elmhurst, Illinois	Sockers FC	3/5 stars
Natalie Grosse; DF	(United States)	San Francisco, California	De Anza Force	NR
Riley Prozzo; FW	(United States)	Southington, Connecticut	FSA FC United	3/5 stars
Ashley Roberts; MF	(United States)	Victoria, British Columbia	Vancouver Whitecaps	3/5 stars

== Squad ==
=== Roster ===
As of December 30, 2024

Note: Flags indicate national team as defined under FIFA eligibility rules; some limited exceptions apply. Players may hold more than one non-FIFA nationality.

No.	Pos.	Nation	Player
0	GK	USA	Olivia Shippee
1	GK	GER	Wiebke Willebrandt
2	DF	USA	Jordan Teguis
3	MF	USA	Delaney Van Pelt
4	DF	USA	Sarai Costello
5	FW	CAN	Aislin Streicek
6	DF	USA	Ava McNeil
7	MF	USA	Georgina Clarke
8	MF	USA	Bella Douglas
9	FW	USA	Sydney Segalla
10	MF	USA	Emily Sapienza
11	FW	USA	Ava Lung
12	DF	USA	Amalia Dray

No.	Pos.	Nation	Player
13	DF	USA	Riley Prozzo
15	MF	CAN	Ashley Roberts
16	MF	USA	Elly Slensky
18	DF	USA	Shea Boyle
20	MF	USA	Baylor Goldthwaite
21	FW	USA	Andi Barth
22	FW	USA	Ella Richards
23	DF	USA	Grace Courter
24	FW	USA	Paige Peltier
25	MF	USA	Sophia Lowenberg
28	MF	USA	Natalie Grosse
33	GK	CAN	Faith Fenwick
34	GK	USA	Maya Cheeseboro

=== Team management ===
Position	Staff
Head coach	Chris Watkins
Assistant Coach	Whitney Pitalo
Assistant Coach	Andrea Morrow
Assistant Coach	Stephanie Demake
Director of Operations	Molly Abbott

== Schedule ==
Date Time, TV	Rank^{#}	Opponent^{#}	Result	Record	Site (Attendance) City, State
Exhibition
August 8*; 6:00 p.m.		UMass Lowell	None reported	—	Cushing Field Complex; Lowell, MA
August 10*; 5:30 p.m.		McGill	None reported	—	Newton Campus Soccer Field; Chestnut Hill, MA
Regular season
August 15*; 11:00 a.m., ACCNX		Jacksonville	W 1–0	1–0–0	Newton Campus Soccer Field (121); Chestnut Hill, MA
August 18*; 1:00 p.m., ACCNX		Merrimack	W 5–1	2–0–0	Newton Campus Soccer Field (254); Chestnut Hill, MA
August 22*; 1:00 p.m., ACCNX		Gardner–Webb	W 2–1	3–0–0	Newton Campus Soccer Field (197); Chestnut Hill, MA
August 25*; 1:00 p.m., ACCNX		LIU	W 6–0	4–0–0	Newton Campus Soccer Field (315); Chestnut Hill, MA
August 29*; 7:00 p.m., ESPN+		at Dartmouth	W 1–0	5–0–0	Burnham Field (597); Hanover, NH
September 1*; 1:00 p.m., ACCNX		UMass	L 1–2	5–1–0	Newton Campus Soccer Field (410); Chestnut Hill, MA
September 5*; 6:00 p.m., ESPN+		at Cornell	W 3–2	6–1–0	Berman Field (237); Ithaca, NY
September 8*; 1:00 p.m., ACCNX		Cal State Fullerton	W 1–0	7–1–0	Newton Campus Soccer Field (348); Chestnut Hill, MA
September 12; 7:00 p.m., ACCN		No. 13 Notre Dame	T 2–2	7–1–1 (0–0–1)	Newton Campus Soccer Field (796); Chestnut Hill, MA
September 15; 1:00 p.m., ACCN		at SMU	L 0–1	7–2–1 (0–1–1)	Washburne Stadium (526); Dallas, TX
September 19*; 7:00 p.m., ACCNX		Grambling State	W 5–0	8–2–1	Newton Campus Soccer Field (175); Chestnut Hill, MA
September 22; 1:00 p.m., ACCNX		Virginia Tech	W 3–1	9–2–1 (1–1–1)	Newton Campus Soccer Field (425); Chestnut Hill, MA
October 3; 7:00 p.m., ACCNX		at NC State	W 2–1	10–2–1 (2–1–1)	Dail Soccer Field (1,013); Raleigh, NC
October 6; 1:00 p.m., ACCNX		at Clemson	L 0–2	10–3–1 (2–2–1)	Riggs Field (802); Clemson, SC
October 12; 7:00 p.m., ACCNX		No. 22 Florida State	L 0–1	10–4–1 (2–3–1)	Newton Campus Soccer Field (1,024); Chestnut Hill, MA
October 19; 7:00 p.m., ACCNX		at No. 1 Duke	L 0–7	10–5–1 (2–4–1)	Koskinen Stadium (1,504); Durham, NC
October 24; 7:00 p.m., ACCNX		at Louisville	T 0–0	10–5–2 (2–4–2)	Lynn Stadium (375); Louisville, KY
October 27; 12:30 p.m., ACCNX		Miami (FL)	W 3–0	11–5–2 (3–4–2)	Newton Campus Soccer Field (252); Chestnut Hill, MA
October 31; 7:00 p.m., ACCNX		Syracuse	W 3–1	12–5–2 (4–4–2)	Newton Campus Soccer Field (623); Chestnut Hill, MA
*Non-conference game. ^{#}Rankings from United Soccer Coaches. (#) Tournament seedings in parentheses. All times are in Eastern.

== Awards and honors ==
Recipient	Award	Date	Ref.
Wiebke Willebrandt	ACC Co-Defensive Player of the Week – Week 11	October 26, 2024	

== Rankings ==
Ranking movements Legend: — = Not ranked
	Week																	
Poll	Pre	1	2	3	4	5	6	7	8	9	10	11	12	13	14	15	16	Final
United Soccer	—	—	—	—	—	—	—	—	—	—	—	—	Not released					—
TopDrawer Soccer	—	—	—	—	—	—	—	—	—	—	—	—	—	—	—	—	—	—
