= 2024 Clemson Tigers women's soccer team =

American college soccer season

2024 Clemson Tigers women's soccer
- Conference: Atlantic Coast Conference
- Record: 6–8–3 (2–7–1 ACC)
- Head coach: Eddie Radwanski (14th season)
- Associate head coach: Jeff Robbins (14th season)
- Assistant coaches: Siri Mullinix (14th season); Allison Wetherington (2nd season)
- Home stadium: Riggs Field

2024 ACC women's soccer standings
	Conf.						Overall
Team	W		L		T	PCT	W		L		T	PCT
No. 3 Duke ‍†‍‍^{y}	9	–	0	–	1	.950	18	–	3	–	1	.841
No. 2 Wake Forest ‍‍‍^{y}	7	–	2	–	1	.750	16	–	4	–	4	.750
No. 13 Florida State ‍‍‡‍^{y}	7	–	2	–	1	.750	15	–	2	–	4	.810
No. 1 North Carolina ‍‍‍^{y}	7	–	3	–	0	.700	22	–	5	–	0	.815
No. 7 Virginia Tech ‍‍‍^{y}	6	–	2	–	2	.700	14	–	6	–	3	.674
No. 6 Notre Dame ‍‍‍^{y}	5	–	1	–	4	.700	14	–	4	–	4	.727
California ‍‍‍^{y}	5	–	4	–	1	.550	13	–	6	–	2	.667
No. 4 Stanford ‍‍‍^{y}	5	–	4	–	1	.550	16	–	5	–	2	.739
Virginia ‍‍‍^{y}	5	–	5	–	0	.500	13	–	5	–	1	.711
Boston College ‍‍‍	4	–	4	–	2	.500	12	–	5	–	2	.684
Pittsburgh ‍‍‍	3	–	5	–	2	.400	9	–	6	–	3	.583
Louisville ‍‍‍	2	–	5	–	3	.350	7	–	6	–	5	.528
SMU ‍‍‍	2	–	6	–	2	.300	6	–	9	–	2	.412
Clemson ‍‍‍	2	–	7	–	1	.250	6	–	8	–	3	.441
Miami (FL) ‍‍‍	1	–	6	–	3	.250	5	–	8	–	4	.412
NC State ‍‍‍	1	–	6	–	3	.250	4	–	10	–	4	.333
Syracuse ‍‍‍	0	–	9	–	1	.050	6	–	10	–	2	.389
† – Conference champion ‡ – 2024 ACC Tournament champion y – Invited to the NCAA Tournament; As of December 10, 2024; Rankings from United Soccer Coaches Poll; Source: The ACC

The 2024 Clemson Tigers women's soccer team represented Clemson University during the 2024 NCAA Division I women's soccer season. The Tigers were led by head coach Ed Radwanski, in his fourteenth season. The Tigers home games were played at Riggs Field in Clemson, South Carolina. This was the team's 31st season playing organized soccer, and all of those seasons were played in the Atlantic Coast Conference.

The Tigers started the season ranked fifth in the country, but suffered a 4–0 defeat to unranked Auburn to start the season. A defeat of High Point could not save them from falling out of the rankings after the first week. After the High Point win, the Tigers won three more games, including a 3–0 win over Power 5 opponent West Virginia. They returned to the rankings at number twenty five before tying rival South Carolina and Charlotte to end the non-conference regular season 4–1–2. The start of ACC play was difficult for the Tigers, as they lost their first four ACC games. The losses included defeats to third ranked Duke and sixth ranked Florida State. They won their next two games against Boston College and Miami before dropping their next three games. Two of the three losses were to ranked teams in fourth ranked North Carolina and twenty fourth ranked Virginia. They ended their season with a 0–0 tie against Louisville.

The Tigers finished the season 6–8–3 overall and 2–7–1 in ACC play to finish in fourteenth place. They did not qualify for the ACC Tournament and were not invited to the NCAA Tournament. Their six overall wins were the lowest since 2012 and tied for the lowest in the time since Radwanski has been head coach. Their two conference wins were also the lowest since 2012. By not earning an invite to the NCAA tournament, they broke a streak of qualifying for ten consecutive tournaments.

== Previous season ==
The Tigers finished the season 18–4–4 overall and 7–2–1 in ACC play to finish in third place. As the third seed in the ACC Tournament they defeated Wake Forest in the First Round and Notre Dame in the Semifinals. They faced off against Florida State in the final and lost 2–1. They received an at-large invitation to the NCAA Tournament where they were a one-seed in the Clemson Bracket and earned home field advantage until the College Cup. They defeated Radford in the First Round, Columbia in the Second Round, and advanced in a penalty shoot-out over Georgia in the Round of 16. The Tigers faced second seed Penn State in the Quarterfinals and won 2–1 and advanced to their first College Cup in program history. In the College Cup, Clemson faced Florida State for the third time during the season, and lost 2–0, to end their season.

== Offseason ==
=== Departures ===
Departures
Name	Number	Pos.	Height	Year	Hometown	Reason for Departure
Halle Mackiewicz	1	GK	5'10"	Senior	Broomfield, Colorado	Graduated; Drafted 32th overall in the 2024 NWSL Draft
Makenna Morris	2	DF	5'5"	Senior	Germantown, Maryland	Graduated; Drafted 13th overall in the 2024 NWSL Draft
Harper White	4	DF	5'8"	Graduate Student	Nashville, Tennessee	Graduated
Emma Wennar	13	FW	5'4"	Sophomore	Milton, Vermont	Transferred to College of Charleston
Hal Hershfelt	15	MF	5'8"	Graduate Student	San Diego, California	Graduated; Drafted 5th overall in the 2024 NWSL Draft
Emma Lerner	17	MF	5'6"	(redshirt) Sophomore	Mentor, Ohio	Graduated
Caroline Conti	23	FW	5'6"	Graduate Student	Greenville, South Carolina	Graduated; Drafted 34th overall in the 2024 NWSL Draft

=== Incoming transfers ===
Incoming transfers
Name	Number	Pos.	Height	Year	Hometown	Previous School
Nona Reason	1	GK	5'10"	(redshirt) Sophomore	Noblesville, Indiana	North Carolina
Kam Pickett	13	DF	5'0"	Graduate Student	Santa Barbara, California	Pepperdine
Jordan Thompson	29	FW	5'6"	Graduate Student	Lee, New Hampshire	College of Charleston
Christian Brathwaite	30	MF	5'6"	Sophomore	Charlotte, North Carolina	Georgia

=== Recruiting class ===
Name	Nationality	Hometown	Club	TDS Rating
Kendall Bodak; MF	(United States)	Monson, Massachusetts	NEFC	4/5 stars
Anna Castenfelt; MF	(United States)	Paradise Valley, Arizona	Utah Royals FC - Arizona	4/5 stars
Emilia Eriksen; DF	(United States)	Los Gatos, California	IMG Academy	3/5 stars
Ella Johnson; FW	(United States)	Wrightsville Beach, North Carolina	Wilmington Hammerheads	4/5 stars
Anna Rydin; DF	(United States)	Chapel Hill, North Carolina	North Carolina Courage Youth	3/5 stars
Allie Serlenga; FW	(United States)	Mount Laurel, New Jersey	PDA (ENCL)	3/5 stars

== Squad ==
=== Roster ===
As of December 16, 2024

Note: Flags indicate national team as defined under FIFA eligibility rules; some limited exceptions apply. Players may hold more than one non-FIFA nationality.

No.	Pos.	Nation	Player
1	GK	USA	Nona Reason
2	MF	USA	Kendall Bodak
3	DF	USA	Layne St. George
5	MF	ENG	Emily Brough
6	DF	USA	Eleanor Hays
7	MF	USA	Dani Davis
8	FW	USA	Jenna Tobia
9	DF	USA	Mackenzie Duff
10	FW	USA	Renee Lyles
11	FW	USA	Tatum Short
12	FW	USA	Sydney Minarik
13	DF	USA	Kam Pickett
15	FW	USA	Ella Johnson
16	MF	USA	Ella Hauser

No.	Pos.	Nation	Player
17	MF	USA	Anna Castenfelt
18	FW	USA	Maria Manousos
19	DF	USA	Anna Rydin
21	DF	USA	Emilia Eriksen
22	MF	USA	Gabby Gambino
23	FW	USA	Allie Serlenga
24	DF	USA	Megan Bornkamp
25	DF	USA	Dani Lynch
26	GK	USA	Addy Holgorsen
27	MF	USA	Erin Sherden
29	FW	USA	Jordan Thompson
30	MF	USA	Christian Brathwaite
34	GK	USA	Ally Lynch

=== Team management ===
Position	Staff
Athletic Director	(United States) Graham Neff
Head coach	(United States) Eddie Radwanski
Associate head coach	(United States) Jeff Robbins
Assistant coach	(United States) Siri Mullinix
Assistant Coach	(United States) Allison Wetherington

== Schedule ==
Date Time, TV	Rank^{#}	Opponent^{#}	Result	Record	Site City, State
Exhibition
August 4*; 7:00 p.m.	No. 5	No. 14 Georgia	None Reported	–	Riggs Field; Clemson, SC
August 10*; 11:00 a.m.	No. 5	UNC Wilmington	None Reported	–	Riggs Field; Clemson, SC
Non-conference regular season
August 15*; 6:30 p.m., SECN+	No. 5	at Auburn	L 0–4	0–1–0	Auburn Soccer Complex (1,212); Auburn, AL
August 18*; 5:00 p.m., ACCNX	No. 5	High Point	W 2–0	1–1–0	Riggs Field (1,463); Clemson, SC
August 23*; 7:00 p.m., ACCNX		West Virginia	W 3–0	2–1–0	Riggs Field (1,209); Clemson, SC
August 29*; 7:00 p.m., ESPN+		at Furman	W 4–1	3–1–0	Stone Stadium (1,676); Greenville, SC
September 1*; 1:00 p.m., FloFC		at Campbell	W 3–1	4–1–0	Eakes Athletics Complex (218); Buies Creek, NC
September 5*; 7:00 p.m., ESPNU	No. 25	at South Carolina; Rivalry	T 1–1	4–1–1	Stone Stadium (6,050); Columbia, SC
September 8*; 7:00 p.m., ESPN+	No. 25	at Charlotte	T 0–0	4–1–2	Transamerica Field (683); Charlotte, NC
ACC Regular Season
September 12; 7:00 p.m., ACCNX		Virginia Tech	L 1–2	4–2–2 (0–1–0)	Riggs Field (526); Clemson, SC
September 19; 7:00 p.m., ACCN		No. 3т Duke	L 1–3	4–3–2 (0–2–0)	Riggs Field (804); Clemson, SC
September 28 (Note: Originally schedule for September 26, but delayed due to Hurricane Helene); 7:00 p.m., ACCN		at No. 6 Florida State	L 0–3	4–4–2 (0–3–0)	Seminole Soccer Complex (894); Tallahassee, FL
October 3; 6:00 p.m., ACCN		at Pittsburgh	L 1–4	4–5–2 (0–4–0)	Ambrose Urbanic Field (596); Pittsburgh, PA
October 6; 1:00 p.m., ACCNX		Boston College	W 2–0	5–5–2 (1–4–0)	Riggs Field (802); Clemson, SC
October 12; 7:00 p.m., ACCNX		Miami (FL)	W 2–1	6–5–2 (2–4–0)	Riggs Field (1,374); Clemson, SC
October 17; 7:00 p.m., ACCNX		at No. 4 North Carolina	L 0–6	6–6–2 (2–5–0)	Dorrance Field (2,237); Chapel Hill, NC
October 20; 1:00 p.m., ACCNX		at NC State	L 0–1	6–7–2 (2–6–0)	Dail Soccer Field (593); Raleigh, NC
October 25; 7:00 p.m., ACCNX		at No. 24 Virginia	L 0–1	6–8–2 (2–7–0)	Klöckner Stadium (1,956); Charlottesville, VA
October 31; 7:00 p.m., ACCNX		Louisville	T 0–0	6–8–3 (2–7–1)	Riggs Field (1,174); Clemson, SC
*Non-conference game. ^{#}Rankings from United Soccer Coaches. (#) Tournament seedings in parentheses. All times are in Eastern.

== Goals record ==
Rank	No.	Nat.	Po.	Name	Regular season	NCAA Tournament	Total
1	2	(United States)	MF	Kendall Bodak	3	0	3
1	9	(United States)	DF	Mackenzie Duff	3	0	3
1	30	(United States)	MF	Christian Brathwaite	3	0	3
4	8	(United States)	FW	Jenna Tobia	2	0	2
4	18	(United States)	FW	Maria Manousos	2	0	2
4	24	(United States)	DF	Megan Bornkamp	2	0	2
7	7	(United States)	MF	Dani Davis	1	0	1
7	17	(United States)	MF	Anna Castenfelt	1	0	1
7	29	(United States)	FW	Jordan Thompson	1	0	1
7	Opponent own goal				2	0	2
Total					20	0	20

== Disciplinary record ==
Rank	No.	Nat.	Po.	Name	Regular Season			NCAA Tournament			Total		
Rank	No.	Nat.	Po.	Name	Booked	(yellow card) (yellow-red card)	Sent off (straight red)	Booked	(yellow card) (yellow-red card)	Sent off (straight red)	Booked	(yellow card) (yellow-red card)	Sent off (straight red)
1	2	(United States)	MF	Kendall Bodak	1	0	0	0	0	0	1	0	0
1	3	(United States)	DF	Layne St. George	1	0	0	0	0	0	1	0	0
1	7	(United States)	MF	Danni Davis	1	0	0	0	0	0	1	0	0
1	11	(United States)	FW	Tatum Short	1	0	0	0	0	0	1	0	0
1	13	(United States)	DF	Kam Pickett	1	0	0	0	0	0	1	0	0
1	24	(United States)	DF	Megan Bornkamp	1	0	0	0	0	0	1	0	0
Total					6	0	0	0	0	0	6	0	0

== Rankings ==
Ranking movements Legend: ██ Increase in ranking ██ Decrease in ranking — = Not ranked RV = Received votes
	Week																	
Poll	Pre	1	2	3	4	5	6	7	8	9	10	11	12	13	14	15	16	Final
United Soccer	5	RV	RV	25	—	—	—	—	—	—	—	—	Not released					—
TopDrawer Soccer	6	16	13	11	18	—	—	—	—	—	—	—	—	—	—	—	—	—
