= Giovana Canali =

Brazilian footballer (born 2003)

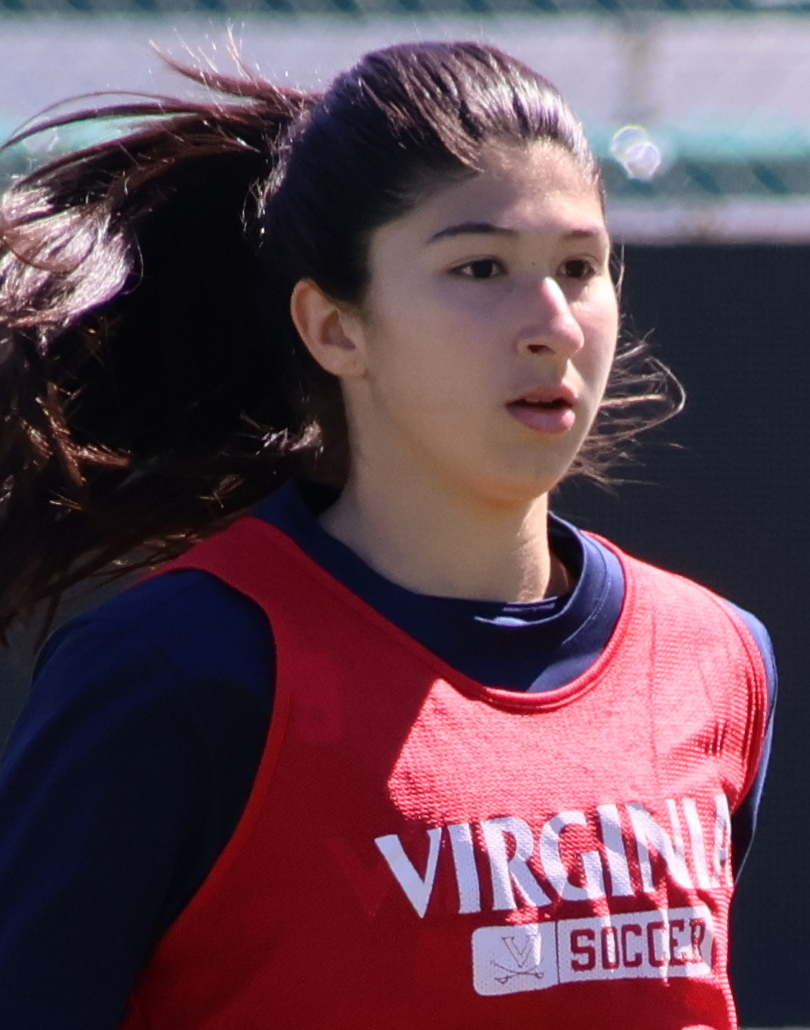
- Canali with Virginia in 2026

Personal information
- Date of birth: 12 February 2006 (age 20)
- Place of birth: Fortaleza, Ceará
- Height: 1.70 m (5 ft 7 in)
- Position: Forward

Team information
- Current team: Virginia Cavaliers
- Number: 9

College career
Years	Team	Apps	(Gls)
2024–2025	Miami Hurricanes	17	(9)
2026–	Virginia Cavaliers	14	(5)

International career^{‡}
2023–2026	Brazil U20	17	(2)
Medal record
Sul-americano feminino sub-20 2024
- ‡ National team caps and goals as of 12 de outubro de 2026

Giovana Canali (born 12 February 2006) is a Brazilian college soccer player who plays as a forward for the Virginia Cavaliers. She previously played for the Miami Hurricanes.

== Early life ==
Originally from Fortaleza, Canali began playing football with her brother and other boys when she was two. At school, she made the boys' futsal team when she was six, and in fourth grade, she created a girls' team when other parents did not want her to keep playing with boys. When she was ten, Canali and her family moved to Boca Raton, Florida, where she played on organized girls' teams for the first time. She earned ECNL all-conference honors three times while playing for FC Prime. She also played high school soccer at West Boca Raton Community High School, receiving all-county honors all four years and scoring 52 goals in 31 games over her last two seasons.

== College career ==
Canali scored a team-leading 9 goals in 17 appearances for the Miami Hurricanes in her freshman season in 2024. She was named to the Atlantic Coast Conference all-freshman team and was named third-team All-ACC, making her Miami's first all-conference player in six years. After missing her entire sophomore season after tearing her anterior cruciate ligament (ACL), she transferred to the Virginia Cavaliers.

== International career ==
Canali was first called up to the Brazil under-20 team in July 2023, scoring in her friendly debut against Belgium in December of the same year. She made the squad for the 2024 South American Under-20 Women's Football Championship, appearing in six games as Brazil won the competition.

== Honours ==
Brazil U20

- South American U-20 Women's Championship: 2024

Individual

- Third-team All-ACC: 2024
