= 2024 NC State Wolfpack women's soccer team =

American college soccer season

2024 NC State Wolfpack women's soccer
- Conference: Atlantic Coast Conference
- Record: 4–10–4 (1–6–3 ACC)
- Head coach: Tim Santoro (13th season)
- Assistant coaches: Sebastian Vecchio (2nd season); Maddy Haro (2nd season)
- Home stadium: Dail Soccer Field

2024 ACC women's soccer standings
	Conf.						Overall
Team	W		L		T	PCT	W		L		T	PCT
No. 3 Duke ‍†‍‍^{y}	9	–	0	–	1	.950	18	–	3	–	1	.841
No. 2 Wake Forest ‍‍‍^{y}	7	–	2	–	1	.750	16	–	4	–	4	.750
No. 13 Florida State ‍‍‡‍^{y}	7	–	2	–	1	.750	15	–	2	–	4	.810
No. 1 North Carolina ‍‍‍^{y}	7	–	3	–	0	.700	22	–	5	–	0	.815
No. 7 Virginia Tech ‍‍‍^{y}	6	–	2	–	2	.700	14	–	6	–	3	.674
No. 6 Notre Dame ‍‍‍^{y}	5	–	1	–	4	.700	14	–	4	–	4	.727
California ‍‍‍^{y}	5	–	4	–	1	.550	13	–	6	–	2	.667
No. 4 Stanford ‍‍‍^{y}	5	–	4	–	1	.550	16	–	5	–	2	.739
Virginia ‍‍‍^{y}	5	–	5	–	0	.500	13	–	5	–	1	.711
Boston College ‍‍‍	4	–	4	–	2	.500	12	–	5	–	2	.684
Pittsburgh ‍‍‍	3	–	5	–	2	.400	9	–	6	–	3	.583
Louisville ‍‍‍	2	–	5	–	3	.350	7	–	6	–	5	.528
SMU ‍‍‍	2	–	6	–	2	.300	6	–	9	–	2	.412
Clemson ‍‍‍	2	–	7	–	1	.250	6	–	8	–	3	.441
Miami (FL) ‍‍‍	1	–	6	–	3	.250	5	–	8	–	4	.412
NC State ‍‍‍	1	–	6	–	3	.250	4	–	10	–	4	.333
Syracuse ‍‍‍	0	–	9	–	1	.050	6	–	10	–	2	.389
† – Conference champion ‡ – 2024 ACC Tournament champion y – Invited to the NCAA Tournament; As of December 10, 2024; Rankings from United Soccer Coaches Poll; Source: The ACC

The 2024 NC State Wolfpack women's soccer team represented NC State University during the 2024 NCAA Division I women's soccer season. The Wolfpack were led by head coach Tim Santoro, in his thirteenth season. They played their home games at Dail Soccer Field. This was the team's 41st season playing organized women's college soccer and their 38th playing in the Atlantic Coast Conference.

The season started slowly with a draw against Appalachian State. They then lost to East Carolina and Campbell before defeating VCU. After the victory, the Wolfpack were ranked twenty-fifth in the national rankings. They defeated Charlotte before falling back out of the rankings. They lost their only non-conference match versus a Power 5 opponent, Rutgers. They followed that with a loss and a win to finish the non-conference season 3–4–1. They started the ACC season with two losses, including one to top-ranked Stanford. They managed a 1–1 draw with thirteenth-ranked Notre Dame before losing their next three games. They then drew Syracuse before defeating Clemson for their first ACC win of the season. They drew with nineteenth-ranked Virginia Tech before losing to third-ranked Wake Forest to end their ACC season 1–6–3. After the season, head coach Tim Santoro was fired.

The Wolfpack finished 4–10–4 overall and 1–6–3 in ACC play to finish in a tie for fifteenth place. They did not qualify for the ACC Tournament and were not invited to the NCAA Tournament.

== Previous season ==
The Wolfpack finished 3–9–6 overall and 2–5–3 in ACC play to finish in a tie for tenth place. They did not qualify for the ACC Tournament and were not invited to the NCAA Tournament.

== Offseason ==
=== Departures ===
Departures
Name	Number	Pos.	Height	Year	Hometown	Reason for departure
Mackenzie Smith	2	DF	5'7"	Freshman	Leicester, England	Transferred to East Carolina
Leyah Hall-Robinson	4	FW	5'4"	Senior	Bowie, Maryland	Graduated
Emika Kawagishi	7	MF	5'1"	Junior	Osaka, Japan	Transferred to Kansas
Mia Vaughn	14	FW	5'6"	Senior	Virginia Beach, Virginia	Graduated
Jameese Joseph	15	FW	5'7"	Senior	Beltsville, Maryland	Graduated, drafted 15th overall in the 2024 NWSL Draft
Brianna Holt	17	FW	5'5"	Junior	Wake Forest, North Carolina	—
Madison Reid	18	DF	5'8"	Senior	Cary, North Carolina	Graduated
Maria Echezarreta	19	GK	5'8"	Senior	Aviles, Spain	Graduated
Alexis Strickland	23	FW	5'4"	Senior	Raleigh, North Carolina	Graduated
Sarah Arnold	25	MF	5'9"	Junior	Raleigh, North Carolina	—

=== Incoming transfers ===
Incoming transfers
Name	Number	Pos.	Height	Year	Hometown	Previous school
Yuna Aoki	2	DF		Sophomore	Shizuoka, Japan	Arizona Western
Abi Hugh	7	MF	5'4"	Graduate Student	Huntington, West Virginia	Marshall
Alivia Kelly	15	DF	5'11"	Graduate Student	Pembroke, Massachusetts	New Hampshire
Paige Tolentino	23	DF	5'5"	Graduate Student	Pinehurst, North Carolina	North Carolina
Kennedy Dunnings	24	DF	5'2"	Graduate Student	Virginia Beach, Virginia	Radford

=== Recruiting class ===
Name	Nationality	Hometown	Club	TDS Rating
Savannah Hutchins; FW	(United States)	Moorpark, California	Slammers FC HB Koge	3/5 stars
Antonella Mazziotto; FW	(Uruguay)	Fray Bentos, Uruguay	IMG Academy	N/A
Madeline Miller; FW	(United States)	Falls Church, Virginia	Virginia Development Academy	3/5 stars
Mana Nakata; MF	(Japan)	Osaka, Japan	Cerezo Osaka	N/A
Janet Okeke; DF	(Canada)	Laval, Canada	Quebec REX	N/A
Sina Tölzel; GK	(Germany)	Bamberg, Germany	FC Nürnberg	N/A

== Squad ==
=== Roster ===
As of November 26, 2024

Note: Flags indicate national team as defined under FIFA eligibility rules; some limited exceptions apply. Players may hold more than one non-FIFA nationality.

No.	Pos.	Nation	Player
1	GK	USA	Olivia Pratapas
2	DF	JPN	Yuna Aoki
3	DF	USA	Briana Weber
4	DF	USA	Janet Okeke
5	DF	USA	Alex Mohr
6	MF	JPN	Mana Nakata
7	MF	USA	Abi Hugh
8	MF	CAN	Rosalie Olou
9	FW	USA	Hannah Jibril
10	MF	GER	Annika Wohner
11	DF	USA	Fernanda Soto
12	MF	USA	Jaiden Thomas
13	FW	USA	Jade Bordeleau

No.	Pos.	Nation	Player
14	FW	USA	Madie Miller
15	DF	USA	Alivia Kelly
18	GK	GER	Sina Tölzel
19	FW	URU	Antonella Mazziotto
20	DF	USA	Brooklyn Holt
21	MF	USA	Mary Frances Symmes
22	DF	USA	Taylor Chism
23	DF	USA	Paige Tolentino
24	DF	USA	Kennedy Dunnings
25	FW	USA	Savannah Hutchins
26	GK	USA	Emily Earles
27	MF	USA	Eliza Rich
28	MF	USA	Sophia Hernandez

=== Team management ===
Position	Staff
Athletic Director	Boo Corrigan
Head coach	Tim Santoro
Associate head coach	Sebastian Vecchio
Assistant Coach	Maddy Haro
Director of Goalkeeping	Justin Bryant
Director of Operations	Kim Kern

== Schedule ==
Date Time, TV	Rank^{#}	Opponent^{#}	Result	Record	Site (Attendance) City, State
Exhibition
August 8*; 10:30 a.m.		Carolina Ascent	None Reported	–	Dail Soccer Field; Raleigh, NC
Non-conference regular season
August 15*; 7:00 p.m., ACCNX		Appalachian State	T 0–0	0–0–1	Dail Soccer Field (1,027); Raleigh, NC
August 18*; 7:00 p.m., ACCNX		East Carolina	L 0–1	0–1–1	Dail Soccer Field (2,189); Raleigh, NC
August 22*; 7:00 p.m., FloFC		at Campbell	L 1–2	0–2–1	Eakes Athletics Complex (265); Buies Creek, NC
August 25*; 1:00 p.m., ESPN+		at VCU	W 5–0	1–2–1	Sports Backers Stadium (354); Richmond, VA
August 28*; 7:00 p.m., ACCNX	No. 25	Charlotte	W 3–1	2–2–1	Dail Soccer Field (1,895); Raleigh, NC
September 1*; 7:00 p.m., ACCN	No. 25	No. 22 Colorado	Canceled	2–2–1	Dail Soccer Field; Raleigh, NC
September 8*; 1:00 p.m., BTN+		at Rutgers	L 0–2	2–3–1	Yurcak Field (972); Piscataway, NJ
September 12*; 6:00 p.m., ACCNX		William & Mary	L 0–1	2–4–1	Dail Soccer Field (430); Raleigh, NC
September 15*; 12:00 p.m., ACCNX		George Washington	W 4–0	3–4–1	Dail Soccer Field (190); Raleigh, NC
ACC regular season
September 19; 7:00 p.m., ACCNX		California	L 1–3	3–5–1 (0–1–0)	Dail Soccer Field (407); Raleigh, NC
September 22; 1:00 p.m., ACCNX		No. 1 Stanford	L 0–2	3–6–1 (0–2–0)	Dail Soccer Field (786); Raleigh, NC
September 26; 7:00 p.m., ACCNX		at No. 13 Notre Dame	T 1–1	3–6–2 (0–2–1)	Alumni Stadium (250); Notre Dame, IN
September 29; 1:00 p.m., ACCNX		at Louisville	L 0–1	3–7–2 (0–3–1)	Lynn Stadium (250); Louisville, KY
October 3; 7:00 p.m., ACCNX		Boston College	L 1–2	3–8–2 (0–4–1)	Dail Soccer Field (1,013); Raleigh, NC
October 10; 7:00 p.m., ACCN		at No. 25 Virginia	L 0–3	3–9–2 (0–5–1)	Klöckner Stadium (1,244); Charlottesville, VA
October 17; 7:00 p.m., ACCNX		at Syracuse	T 1–1	3–9–3 (0–5–2)	SU Soccer Stadium (1,244); Syracuse, NY
October 20; 1:00 p.m., ACCNX		Clemson	W 1–0	4–9–3 (1–5–2)	Dail Soccer Field (593); Raleigh, NC
October 24; 7:00 p.m., ACCN		No. 19 Virginia Tech	T 0–0	4–9–4 (1–5–3)	Dail Soccer Field (667); Raleigh, NC
October 31; 7:00 p.m., ACCNX		at No. 3 Wake Forest	L 0–3	4–10–4 (1–6–3)	Spry Stadium (894); Winston-Salem, NC
*Non-conference game. ^{#}Rankings from United Soccer Coaches. (#) Tournament seedings in parentheses. All times are in Eastern.

== Rankings ==
Ranking movements Legend: ██ Increase in ranking ██ Decrease in ranking — = Not ranked
	Week																	
Poll	Pre	1	2	3	4	5	6	7	8	9	10	11	12	13	14	15	16	Final
United Soccer	—	—	25	—	—	—	—	—	—	—	—	—	Not released					—
TopDrawer Soccer	—	—	—	—	—	—	—	—	—	—	—	—	—	—	—	—	—	—
