= 2024 Atlantic Coast Conference women's soccer season =

- League: NCAA Division I
- Sport: Soccer
- Duration: August 15, 2024 – October 31, 2024
- Teams: 17

Regular season
- Season champions: Duke
- Runners-up: Wake Forest
- Season MVP: Offensive:Karlie Lema; Midfielder:Maggie Graham; Defensive:Cameron Roller
- Top scorer: Karlie Lema (California)

Tournament
- Champions: Florida State
- Runners-up: North Carolina
- Finals MVP: Taylor Huff (Florida State)

ACC women's soccer seasons
- ← 2023 2025 →

2024 ACC women's soccer standings
	Conf.						Overall
Team	W		L		T	PCT	W		L		T	PCT
No. 3 Duke ‍†‍‍^{y}	9	–	0	–	1	.950	18	–	3	–	1	.841
No. 2 Wake Forest ‍‍‍^{y}	7	–	2	–	1	.750	16	–	4	–	4	.750
No. 13 Florida State ‍‍‡‍^{y}	7	–	2	–	1	.750	15	–	2	–	4	.810
No. 1 North Carolina ‍‍‍^{y}	7	–	3	–	0	.700	22	–	5	–	0	.815
No. 7 Virginia Tech ‍‍‍^{y}	6	–	2	–	2	.700	14	–	6	–	3	.674
No. 6 Notre Dame ‍‍‍^{y}	5	–	1	–	4	.700	14	–	4	–	4	.727
California ‍‍‍^{y}	5	–	4	–	1	.550	13	–	6	–	2	.667
No. 4 Stanford ‍‍‍^{y}	5	–	4	–	1	.550	16	–	5	–	2	.739
Virginia ‍‍‍^{y}	5	–	5	–	0	.500	13	–	5	–	1	.711
Boston College ‍‍‍	4	–	4	–	2	.500	12	–	5	–	2	.684
Pittsburgh ‍‍‍	3	–	5	–	2	.400	9	–	6	–	3	.583
Louisville ‍‍‍	2	–	5	–	3	.350	7	–	6	–	5	.528
SMU ‍‍‍	2	–	6	–	2	.300	6	–	9	–	2	.412
Clemson ‍‍‍	2	–	7	–	1	.250	6	–	8	–	3	.441
Miami (FL) ‍‍‍	1	–	6	–	3	.250	5	–	8	–	4	.412
NC State ‍‍‍	1	–	6	–	3	.250	4	–	10	–	4	.333
Syracuse ‍‍‍	0	–	9	–	1	.050	6	–	10	–	2	.389
† – Conference champion ‡ – 2024 ACC Tournament champion y – Invited to the NCAA Tournament; As of December 10, 2024; Rankings from United Soccer Coaches Poll; Source: The ACC

The 2024 Atlantic Coast Conference women's soccer season was the 36th season of women's varsity soccer in the conference. This was the first season where seventeen teams compete in the conference, after the additions of California, SMU, and Stanford on July 1, 2024.

Florida State were the defending regular season and ACC tournament titlists. They finished 9–0–1 in ACC play and won both of their games in the ACC Tournament. Florida State would go on to win the national championship, and complete an undefeated season. They were the first team to finish undefeated since Stanford in 2011.

The Duke Blue Devils finished as regular season champions with a record of 9–0–1. They were unable to prevail in the ACC tournament as third-seed Florida State won its fifth consecutive tournament title. The ACC sent nine teams to the NCAA tournament and Duke and Florida State both earned first seeds. Six of the final eight teams, and all of the final four teams were from the ACC. North Carolina prevailed over Wake Forest in the final. This was the second straight year and third time in the last four years a team from the ACC has won the National Title.

== Teams ==
=== Stadiums and locations ===
Team	Stadium	Capacity
Boston College Eagles	Newton Soccer Complex	1,800
California Golden Bears	Edwards Stadium	22,000
Clemson Tigers	Riggs Field	6,500
Duke Blue Devils	Koskinen Stadium	7,000
Florida State Seminoles	Seminole Soccer Complex	2,000
Louisville Cardinals	Lynn Stadium	5,300
Miami Hurricanes	Cobb Stadium	500
NC State	Dail Soccer Field	3,000

Team	Stadium	Capacity
North Carolina Tar Heels	Dorrance Field	4,200
Notre Dame Fighting Irish	Alumni Stadium	2,500
Pittsburgh Panthers	Ambrose Urbanic Field	735
SMU Mustangs	Washburne Stadium	2,577
Stanford Cardinal	Cagan Stadium	2,000
Syracuse Orange	SU Soccer Stadium	1,500
Virginia Cavaliers	Klöckner Stadium	7,100
Virginia Tech Hokies	Thompson Field	2,500
Wake Forest Demon Deacons	Spry Stadium	3,000

1. Georgia Tech does not sponsor women's soccer

== Coaches ==
=== Head coaching changes ===
Two ACC teams entered the season with new coaches:

- Boston College fired head coach Jason Lowe after five season with the team. Chris Watkins was hired as his replacement on December 14, 2023.
- North Carolina was set to be led by Anson Dorrance but Dorrance announced his retirement just four days prior to the season beginning on August 11, 2024. Damon Nahas was selected to be the interim head coach.
- Miami fired head coach Sarah Barnes after six season with the program. Ken Masuhr was hired as the new head coach on December 5, 2023.

=== Head coaching records ===
Team	Head coach	Years at school	Overall record	Record at school	ACC record
Boston College	Chris Watkins	1	79–33–16	0–0–0	0–0–0
California	Neil McGuire	18	222–174–47	178–105–41	0–0–0
Clemson	Eddie Radwanski	14	282–146–48	143–81–34	61–57–13
Duke	Robbie Church	24	381–196–77	293–147–66	112–70–39
Florida State	Brian Pensky	3	224–114–49	39–3–4	17–2–1
Louisville	Karen Ferguson-Dayes	23	204–192–46	204–192–46	36–50–13
Miami	Ken Masuhr	1	0–0–0	0–0–0	0–0–0
North Carolina	Anson Dorrance	46	896–80–50	896–80–50	226–30–18
NC State	Tim Santoro	12	86–98–29	86–98–29	27–63–13
Notre Dame	Nate Norman	7	126–73–25	68–38–12	33–20–2
Pittsburgh	Randy Waldrum	7	461–153–37	62–45–8	27–38–5
SMU	Nicole Nelson	3	21–10–6	21–10–6	0–0–0
Stanford	Paul Ratcliffe	22	431–101–46	376–67–39	0–0–0
Syracuse	Nicky Adams	6	105–106–31	18–51–8	3–39–5
Virginia	Steve Swanson	24	475–171–73	371–108–62	147–51–29
Virginia Tech	Charles Adair	14	155–83–27	155–83–27	59–57–16
Wake Forest	Tony da Luz	27	348–237–60	303–196–58	103–118–28

Notes

- Records shown are prior to the 2024 season
- Years at school includes the 2024 season

== Pre-season ==
=== Hermann Trophy Watchlist ===
The Hermann Trophy preseason watchlist was released on August 15, 2024.

Player	Class	Position	School
Elise Evans	Junior	DF	Stanford
Jasmine Aikey	Junior	MF	Stanford
Taylor Huff	Senior	MF	Florida State
Jordynn Dudley	Sophomore	FW	Florida State
Giana Riley	Junior	FW	Florida State

=== Pre-season poll ===
The pre-season poll and pre-season all conference teams were voted on by the league's 17 head coaches. The results of the poll were released on August 8, one week prior to the season starting.

==== Pre-season Coaches Poll ====
Predicted finish	Team	Points (1st place)
1	Florida State	255 (15)
2	Stanford	235 (2)
3	Notre Dame	211
4	North Carolina	187
5	Clemson	186
6	Virginia	177
7	Duke	175
8	Pittsburgh	168
9	Wake Forest	160
10	Virginia Tech	116
11	California	111
12	NC State	85
13	Louisville	80
14	Boston College	50
14	SMU	50
16	Miami (FL)	44
17	Syracuse	22

==== Pre-season All-ACC Team ====
Position	Player	Class	School
Goalkeeper	Teagan Wy	Junior	California
Defender	Elise Evans	Junior	Stanford
Defender	Heather Gilchrist	Junior	Florida State
Midfielder	Jasmine Aikey	Junior	Stanford
Midfielder	Deborah Abiodun	Sophomore	Pittsburgh
Midfielder	Lia Godfrey	Senior	Virginia
Midfielder	Taylor Huff	Senior	Florida State
Midfielder	Leah Klenke	Junior	Notre Dame
Forward	Maggie Cagle	Junior	Virginia
Forward	Jordynn Dudley	Sophomore	Florida State
Forward	Kat Rader	Junior	Duke
Forward	Sarah Schupansky	Senior	Pittsburgh

== Regular season ==
=== Conference Matrix ===
The table below shows head-to-head results between teams in conference play. Each team played ten matches. Each team did not play every other team. DNP indicates teams that did not play each other.

	Boston College	California	Clemson	Duke	Florida State	Louisville	Miami	North Carolina	NC State	Notre Dame	Pittsburgh	SMU	Stanford	Syracuse	Virginia	Virginia Tech	Wake Forest
vs. Boston College	–	DNP	2–0	7–0	1–0	0–0	0–3	DNP	1–2	2–2	DNP	1–0	DNP	1–3	DNP	1–2	DNP
vs. California	DNP	–	DNP	2–1	DNP	2–1	2–3	1–0	1–3	5–2	0–1	2–3	2–3	DNP	DNP	DNP	2–2
vs. Clemson	0–2	DNP	–	3–1	3–0	0–0	1–2	6–0	1–0	DNP	4–1	DNP	DNP	DNP	1–0	2–1	DNP
vs. Duke	0–7	1–2	1–3	–	DNP	1–3	DNP	2–3	DNP	3–3	DNP	0–3	1–4	DNP	1–3	DNP	0–2
vs. Florida State	0–1	DNP	0–3	DNP	–	DNP	0–1	2–4	DNP	DNP	1–7	1–1	DNP	1–5	0–4	3–2	4–1
vs. Louisville	0–0	1–2	0–0	3–1	DNP	–	DNP	5–0	0–1	0–0	3–1	DNP	1–0	DNP	DNP	5–1	DNP
vs. Miami	3–0	3–2	2–1	DNP	1–0	DNP	–	DNP	DNP	DNP	0–0	3–3	1–0	1–3	3–1	0–0	DNP
vs. North Carolina	DNP	0–1	0–6	3–2	4–2	0–5	DNP	–	DNP	DNP	0–1	DNP	1–0	0–1	2–3	DNP	0–1
vs. NC State	2–1	3–1	0–1	DNP	DNP	1–0	DNP	DNP	–	1–1	DNP	DNP	2–0	1–1	3–0	0–0	3–0
vs. Notre Dame	2–2	2–5	DNP	3–3	DNP	0–0	DNP	DNP	1–1	–	2–3	DNP	0–3	0–3	0–1	2–0	DNP
vs. Pittsburgh	DNP	1–0	1–4	DNP	7–1	1–3	0–0	1–0	DNP	3–2	–	DNP	1–1	0–3	DNP	DNP	2–0
vs. SMU	0–1	3–2	DNP	3–0	1–1	DNP	3–3	DNP	DNP	DNP	DNP	–	2–1	1–4	2–1	1–0	2–1
vs. Stanford	DNP	3–2	DNP	4–1	DNP	0–1	0–1	0–1	0–2	3–0	1–1	1–2	–	DNP	DNP	DNP	1–0
vs. Syracuse	3–1	DNP	DNP	DNP	5–1	DNP	3–1	1–0	1–1	3–0	3–0	4–1	DNP	–	DNP	1–0	3–0
vs. Virginia	DNP	DNP	0–1	3–1	4–0	DNP	1–3	3–2	0–3	1–0	DNP	1–2	DNP	DNP	–	0–1	3–0
vs. Virginia Tech	2–1	DNP	1–2	DNP	2–3	1–5	0–0	DNP	0–0	0–2	DNP	0–1	DNP	0–1	1–0	–	DNP
vs. Wake Forest	DNP	2–2	DNP	2–0	1–4	DNP	DNP	1–0	0–3	DNP	0–2	1–2	0–1	0–3	0–3	DNP	–
Total	4–4–2	5–4–1	2–7–1	9–0–1	7–2–1	2–5–3	1–6–3	7–3–0	1–6–3	5–1–4	3–5–2	2–6–2	5–4–1	0–9–1	5–5–0	6–2–2	7–2–1

=== Rankings ===
==== United Soccer ====
Legend
Increase in ranking
Decrease in ranking
Not ranked previous week

	Pre	Wk 1	Wk 2	Wk 3	Wk 4	Wk 5	Wk 6	Wk 7	Wk 8	Wk 9	Wk 10	Wk 11	Final
Boston College													
California							RV	18	17	25			RV
Clemson	5	RV	RV	25									
Duke	24		RV		8	3т	3	2	1 (6)	1 (8)	1 (8)	1 (8)	3
Florida State	1 (8)	1 (8)	1 (8)	3 (2)	3	2	7	6	22	22	17	6	13
Louisville													
Miami													
NC State			25										
North Carolina	8т	5	5	2	10	8	4	3	2 (2)	4	4	8	1 (8)
Notre Dame	15	14	9	9т	13	16	13	17	13	12	7	13	6
Pittsburgh	7	7						RV	RV	RV			
SMU													
Stanford	2	2	2	1 (6)	1 (8)	1 (8)	6	9	7	6	12	14т	4
Syracuse													
Virginia	RV	21т	7	4	2	14	19	25	25	23	24	RV	RV
Virginia Tech		21т	RV	21		RV			21	18	19	12	7
Wake Forest	RV	RV	18	RV	RV	13	5	4	3	2	2	3	2

==== Top Drawer Soccer ====
Legend
Increase in ranking
Decrease in ranking
Not ranked previous week

	Wk 1	Wk 2	Wk 3	Wk 4	Wk 5	Wk 6	Wk 7	Wk 8	Wk 9	Wk 10	Wk 11	Wk 12	Wk 13	Wk 14	Wk 15	Wk 16	Wk 17	Final
Boston College																		
California							22	13	10	10					25			
Clemson	6	16	13	11	18													
Duke					21	21	8	5	3	1	1	2	2	5	5	3	3	3
Florida State	1	1	1	4	3	3	7	4	12	7	6	4	4	1	1	17	17	17
Louisville																		
Miami																		
North Carolina	13	9	4	2	8	6	2	2	1	6	5	8	9	4	4	2	2	1
NC State																		
Notre Dame	12	20	17	13	11	16	9	9	8	11	7	10	13	14	14	6	7	7
Pittsburgh	3	6	19	16	16	13	16	15	13	8								
SMU																		
Stanford	2	2	2	1	1	1	6	7	5	5	9	11	15	15	15	7	4	4
Syracuse																		
Virginia	23	22	5	3	2	8	10	10										
Virginia Tech												20	24	24	22	8	8	8
Wake Forest			20	20	22	15	4	3	2	2	2	3	3	3	3	1	1	2

=== Players of the Week ===
Week	Offensive Player of the week	Defensive Player of the week	Reference
Week 1 – August 20	Taylor Huff – Florida State	Tatum Galvin – Virginia	
Week 2 – August 27	Olivia Thomas – North Carolina	Victoria Safradin – Virginia	
Week 2 – August 27	Maggie Cagle – Virginia	Victoria Safradin – Virginia	
Week 3 – September 3	Giovana Canali – Miami (FL)	Allie George – Virginia Tech	
Week 4 – September 10	Karlie Lema – California	Cameron Roller – Duke	
Week 5 – September 17	Caiya Hanks – Wake Forest	Jasmine Aikey – Stanford	
Week 5 – September 17	Caiya Hanks – Wake Forest	Lauren Hargrove – Virginia Tech	
Week 6 – September 24	Emily Colton – Wake Forest	Trinity Armstrong – North Carolina	
Week 7 – October 1	Linda Ullmark – North Carolina	Malia McMahon – Notre Dame	
Week 7 – October 1	Linda Ullmark – North Carolina	Leah Freeman – Duke	
Week 8 – October 8	Mia Oliaro – Duke	Claireese Foley – Miami (FL)	
Week 8 – October 8	Emily Murphy – Wake Forest	Claireese Foley – Miami (FL)	
Week 9 – October 15	Maggie Graham – Duke	Erynn Floyd – Louisville	
Week 10 – October 22	Ellie Hodsden – Notre Dame	Emile McCartney – Miami (FL)	
Week 10 – October 22	Ellie Hodsden – Notre Dame	Leah Klenke – Notre Dame	
Week 11 – October 29	Jordynn Dudley – Florida State	Lauren Hargrove (2) – Virginia Tech	
Week 11 – October 29	Jordynn Dudley – Florida State	Wiebke Willebrandt – Boston College	

== Postseason ==
=== ACC Tournament ===
Semifinals
1	Duke	1
4	North Carolina	2
2	Wake Forest	1 (1)
3	Florida State (pen.)	1 (3)

Final
4	North Carolina	2
3	Florida State	3

=== NCAA tournament ===
Seed	School	Region	1st Round	2nd Round	Round of 16	Quarterfinals	Semifinals	Championship
1	Duke	Duke	W 8–0 vs. Howard – (Durham)	W 3–0 vs. #8 Texas Tech – (Durham)	W 2–0 vs. #5 Michigan State – (Durham)	W 1–0 vs. #7 Virginia Tech – (Durham)	L 0–3 vs. #2 North Carolina – (Cary)	
1	Florida State	Florida State	W 8–0 vs. Samford – (Tallahassee)	T 3–3 (3–4 PKs) vs. #8 Vanderbilt – (Tallahassee)				
2	North Carolina	Florida State	W 8–0 vs. USC Upstate – (Chapel Hill)	W 1–0 vs. Santa Clara – (Chapel Hill)	W 3–0 vs. #6 Minnesota – (Chapel Hill)	W 2–1 (OT) vs. #4 Penn State – (Chapel Hill)	W 3–0 vs. #1 Duke – (Cary)	W 1–0 vs. #2 Wake Forest – (Cary)
2	Wake Forest	Southern California	W 4–0 vs. Morehead State – (Winston-Salem)	W 3–1 vs. Colorado – (Winston-Salem)	W 1–0 vs. #3 Ohio State – (Winston-Salem)	T 2–2 (4–3 PKs) @ #1 USC – (Carson)	W 1–0 vs. #3 Stanford – (Cary)	L 0–1 vs. #2 North Carolina – (Cary)
3	Stanford	Mississippi State	W 5–0 vs. UC Santa Barbara – (Stanford)	W 2–1 vs. UConn – (Fayetteville)	T 1–1 (4–2 PKs) @ #2 Arkansas – (Fayetteville)	W 2–0 vs. #4 Notre Dame – (Stanford)	L 0–1 vs. #2 Wake Forest - (Cary)	
4	Notre Dame	Mississippi State	W 5–1 vs. Milwaukee – (Notre Dame)	W 3–1 vs. #5 Kentucky – (Starkville)	W 2–0 @ #1 Mississippi State – (Starkville)	L 0–2 @ #3 Stanford – (Stanford)		
4	Virginia	Southern California	W 2–1 vs. Princeton – (Charlottesville)	T 0–0 (2–4 PKs) vs. #5 Wisconsin – (Los Angeles)				
7	Virginia Tech	Duke	W 2–1 vs. Tennessee – (Blacksburg)	W 2–1 @ #2 UCLA – (Los Angeles)	W 1–0 vs. #3 Iowa – (Los Angeles)	L 0–1 @ #1 Duke – (Durham)		
—	California	Mississippi State	W 2–1 (a.e.t) @ #7 Pepperdine – (Malibu)	L 0–1 @ #2 Arkansas – (Fayetteville)				
W–L (%):			9–0–0 (1.000)	6–1–2 (.778)	5–0–1 (.917)	3–2–1 (.583)	2–2–0 (.500)	1–1–0 (.500) Total: 26–6–4 (.778)

== Awards and honors ==
Conference end of season awards were released on November 6, 2024, prior to the semifinals of the ACC Tournament. Karlie Lema was named Offensive Player of the Year, Maggie Graham won Midfielder of the Year, Cameron Roller won Defensive Player of the Year, Leah Freeman won Goalkeeper of the Year, and Robbie Church was named Coach of the Year. A full list of award winners and All-ACC Teams is shown below.

=== ACC Awards ===
2024 ACC Women's Soccer Individual Awards
Award	Recipient(s)
Coach of the Year	Robbie Church – Duke
Offensive Player of the Year	Karlie Lema – California
Midfielder of the Year	Maggie Graham – Duke
Defensive Player of the Year	Cameron Roller – Duke
Goalkeeper of the Year	Leah Freeman – Duke
Freshman of the Year	Izzy Engle – Notre Dame

2024 ACC Women's Soccer All-Conference Teams
First Team	Second Team	Third Team	All-Freshman Team
Karlie Lema – California; Leah Freeman – Duke; Maggie Graham – Duke; Cameron Roller – Duke; Jordynn Dudley – Florida State; Taylor Huff – Florida State; Trinity Armstrong – North Carolina; Kate Faasse – North Carolina; Izzy Engle – Notre Dame; Leah Klenke – Notre Dame; Caiya Hanks – Wake Forest	Teagan Wy – California; Hannah Bebar – Duke; Ella Hase – Duke; Mia Oliaro – Duke; Deborah Abiodun – Pittsburgh; Sarah Schupansky – Pittsburgh; Jasmine Aikey – Stanford; Mia Bhuta – Stanford; Zara Chavoshi – Wake Forest; Emily Colton – Wake Forest; Emily Murphy – Wake Forest	Heather Gilchrist – Florida State; Mimi Van Zanten – Florida State; Giovana Canali – Miami; Maddie Dahlien – North Carolina; Tessa Dellarose – North Carolina; Annabelle Chukwu – Notre Dame; Lily Joseph – Notre Dame; Nyah Rose – SMU; Elise Evans – Stanford; Maggie Cagle – Virginia; Valentina Amaral – Wake Forest	Wrianna Hudson – Florida State; Solai Washington – Florida State; Giovana Canali – Miami; Trinity Armstrong – North Carolina; Bella Gaetino – North Carolina; Linda Ullmark – North Carolina; Annabelle Chukwu – Notre Dame; Izzy Engle – Notre Dame; Ellie Hodsden – Notre Dame; Lily Joseph – Notre Dame; Eleanor Klinger – Stanford

=== All-Americans ===
2024 United Soccer Coaches All-Americans
First Team	Second Team	Third Team	Fourth Team
Leah Freeman, GK, Duke; Maggie Graham, MF, Duke; Kate Faasse, FW, North Carolina; Caiya Hanks, FW, Wake Forest	Cameron Roller, DF, Duke; Hannah Bebar, MF, Duke; Jordynn Dudley, FW, Florida State; Izzy Engle, FW, Notre Dame	Emily Colton, MF, Wake Forest	Zara Chavoshi, DF, Wake Forest; Heather Gilchrist, DF, Florida State; Mia Bhuta, MF, Stanford; Tessa Dellarose, MF, North Carolina
