= 2024 Virginia Cavaliers women's soccer team =

American college soccer season

2024 Virginia Cavaliers women's soccer

NCAA Tournament, Second Round
- Conference: Atlantic Coast Conference
- U. Soc. Coaches poll: No. RV
- Record: 13–5–1 (5–5–0 ACC)
- Head coach: Steve Swanson (25th season)
- Assistant coaches: Ron Raab (19th season); Sam Raper (3rd season); Lizzy Sieracki (1st season)
- Home stadium: Klöckner Stadium

2024 ACC women's soccer standings
	Conf.						Overall
Team	W		L		T	PCT	W		L		T	PCT
No. 3 Duke ‍†‍‍^{y}	9	–	0	–	1	.950	18	–	3	–	1	.841
No. 2 Wake Forest ‍‍‍^{y}	7	–	2	–	1	.750	16	–	4	–	4	.750
No. 13 Florida State ‍‍‡‍^{y}	7	–	2	–	1	.750	15	–	2	–	4	.810
No. 1 North Carolina ‍‍‍^{y}	7	–	3	–	0	.700	22	–	5	–	0	.815
No. 7 Virginia Tech ‍‍‍^{y}	6	–	2	–	2	.700	14	–	6	–	3	.674
No. 6 Notre Dame ‍‍‍^{y}	5	–	1	–	4	.700	14	–	4	–	4	.727
California ‍‍‍^{y}	5	–	4	–	1	.550	13	–	6	–	2	.667
No. 4 Stanford ‍‍‍^{y}	5	–	4	–	1	.550	16	–	5	–	2	.739
Virginia ‍‍‍^{y}	5	–	5	–	0	.500	13	–	5	–	1	.711
Boston College ‍‍‍	4	–	4	–	2	.500	12	–	5	–	2	.684
Pittsburgh ‍‍‍	3	–	5	–	2	.400	9	–	6	–	3	.583
Louisville ‍‍‍	2	–	5	–	3	.350	7	–	6	–	5	.528
SMU ‍‍‍	2	–	6	–	2	.300	6	–	9	–	2	.412
Clemson ‍‍‍	2	–	7	–	1	.250	6	–	8	–	3	.441
Miami (FL) ‍‍‍	1	–	6	–	3	.250	5	–	8	–	4	.412
NC State ‍‍‍	1	–	6	–	3	.250	4	–	10	–	4	.333
Syracuse ‍‍‍	0	–	9	–	1	.050	6	–	10	–	2	.389
† – Conference champion ‡ – 2024 ACC Tournament champion y – Invited to the NCAA Tournament; As of December 10, 2024; Rankings from United Soccer Coaches Poll; Source: The ACC

The 2024 Virginia Cavaliers women's soccer team represented the University of Virginia during the 2024 NCAA Division I women's soccer season. The Cavaliers were led by head coach Steve Swanson, in his twenty-fifth season. They played home games at Klöckner Stadium. This was the team's 39th season playing organized women's college soccer and their 37th playing in the Atlantic Coast Conference.

The Cavaliers began the season unranked in national polls and won all seven of their non-conference games. They were ranked twenty-first before their match up with number three Penn State, which they won 2–1. That was the only goal Virginia allowed during non-conference play. They did not play another power five or ranked team during non conference. They finished their non-conference slate ranked fourth in the national polls. They started ACC play ranked second and won their first match against Miami. However, they lost their next four straight games, with three of those games being against ranked opponents. The streak started with a loss to unranked Wake Forest before losses to number sixteen Notre Dame, number four North Carolina and number two Duke. They finished the streak ranked twenty-fifth. The Cavaliers won their next two games before losing at number twenty-two Florida State. They fell out of the rankings after a defeat of Clemson. They finished the ACC season with a victory over rivals and twelfth ranked Virginia Tech.

The Cavaliers finished the season 13–5–1 overall and 5–5–0 in ACC play to finish in ninth place. They did not qualify for the ACC Tournament. This was the second consecutive season they did not qualify for the ACC tournament. They received an at-large invitation to the NCAA Tournament, where they were the fourth seed in the Southern California Bracket. They defeated Princeton in the First Round before falling to fifth-seed Wisconsin in the Second Round.

== Previous season ==
The Cavaliers finished the season 8–3–6 overall and 3–3–4 in ACC play to finish in seventh place. They did not qualify for the ACC Tournament and were not invited to the NCAA Tournament. This was the first time the team did not qualify for the ACC tournament since its inception. It was also their first time not making the NCAA tournament since 1993, breaking a streak of twenty-nine straight tournaments. Their eight total wins were tied for the lowest in program history with their 1986 campaign and their three conference wins were their lowest since 2003.

== Offseason ==
=== Departures ===
Departures
Name	Number	Pos.	Height	Year	Hometown	Reason for departure
Cayla White	0	GK	5'6"	Graduate Student	Arlington, Virginia	Graduated
Peyton Goldthwaite	2	MF	5'4"	Senior	Durham, North Carolina	Graduated
Lacey McCormack	11	DF	5'8"	Graduate Student	Arlington, Virginia	Graduated
Brianna Jablonowski	15	FW	5'6"	Senior	Centerport, New York	Graduated; Transferred to Northeastern
Sarah Brunner	18	FW/MF	5'4"	Senior	Jacksonville, Florida	Graduated; Transferred to South Florida
Talia Staude	20	DF	5'7"	Graduate Student	Atlanta, Georgia	Graduated; Drafted 24th overall in the 2024 NWSL Draft

=== Incoming transfers ===
Incoming transfers
Name	Number	Pos.	Height	Year	Hometown	Previous school
Moira Kelley	20	DF	5'9"	Graduate Student	Overland Park, Kansas	Kansas
Linda Mittermair	11	FW/MF	5'7"	Graduate Student	Hitzing, Austria	University of Vienna
Ellie Sommers	33	GK	5'7"	Graduate Student	Boulder, Colorado	Loyola Marymount

=== Recruiting class ===
Name	Nationality	Hometown	Club	TDS Rating
Sophia Bradley; FW	(United States)	Wayne, New Jersey	PDA	4/5 stars
Sarah Flammia; MF	(United States)	Goochland, Virginia	Richmond United	3/5 stars
Kira Waller; MF	(United States)	Alexandria, Virginia	Virginia Union	3/5 stars
Annamarie Williams; MF	(United States)	Natrona Heights, Pennsylvania	Internationals SC (OH)	3/5 stars

== Squad ==
=== Roster ===
As of January 22, 2025

Note: Flags indicate national team as defined under FIFA eligibility rules; some limited exceptions apply. Players may hold more than one non-FIFA nationality.

No.	Pos.	Nation	Player
1	GK	USA	Victoria Safradin
2	MF	USA	Kira Waller
3	MF	USA	Alexis Theoret
4	DF	USA	Kiki Maki
5	MF	USA	Laughlin Ryan
6	FW	USA	Degen Miller
7	MF	USA	Yuna McCormack
8	FW	USA	Allie Ross
9	FW	USA	Meredith McDermott
10	FW	USA	Maggie Cagle
11	FW	AUT	Linda Mittermair
12	DF	USA	Aniyah Collier
13	DF	USA	Helen Symbas
14	MF	USA	Emma Dawson
15	FW	USA	Sarah Flammia

No.	Pos.	Nation	Player
16	MF	USA	Ella Carter
17	DF	USA	Tatum Galvin
18	DF	USA	Samar Guidry
19	MF	USA	Jill Flammia
20	DF	USA	Moira Kelley
21	MF	USA	Chloe Japic
22	MF	USA	Lia Godfrey
23	DF	USA	Laney Rouse
24	DF	USA	Kathryn Kelly
25	MF	USA	Annamarie Williams
26	FW	USA	Maya Carter
27	FW	USA	Sophia Bradley
29	GK	USA	Camryn Miller
33	GK	USA	Ellie Sommers

=== Team management ===
Position	Staff
Athletic Director	Carla Williams
Head coach	Steve Swanson
Associate head coach	Ron Raab
Assistant Coach	Sam Raper
Assistant Coach	Lizzy Sieracki
Director of Operations	Eilidh Thomson

== Schedule ==
Date Time, TV	Rank^{#}	Opponent^{#}	Result	Record	Site (Attendance) City, State
Exhibition
August 7*; 7:00 p.m.		Tennessee	None Reported	–	Klöckner Stadium; Charlottesville, VA
August 10*; 7:30 p.m.		Georgetown	None Reported	–	Klöckner Stadium; Charlottesville, VA
Non-conference Regular season
August 15*; 6:00 p.m., ACCNX		Towson	W 2–0	1–0–0	Klöckner Stadium (1,110); Charlottesville, VA
August 18*; 1:00 p.m., ACCNX		Northwestern	W 2–0	2–0–0	Klöckner Stadium (1,088); Charlottesville, VA
August 22*; 5:30 p.m., BTN+	No. 21т	at No. 3 Penn State	W 2–1	3–0–0	Jeffrey Field (1,603); State College, PA
August 25*; 1:00 p.m., ACCNX	No. 21т	Utah Valley	W 5–0	4–0–0	Klöckner Stadium (—); Charlottesville, VA
September 1*; 6:00 p.m., ESPN+	No. 7	at James Madison	W 3–0	5–0–0	Sentara Park (624); Harrisonburg, VA
September 5*; 7:00 p.m., ESPN+	No. 4	at VCU	W 1–0	6–0–0	Sports Backers Stadium (481); Richmond, VA
September 8*; 2:00 p.m., ACCNX	No. 4	Howard	W 4–0	7–0–0	Klöckner Stadium (1,302); Charlottesville, VA
ACC regular season
September 12; 7:00 p.m., ACCNX	No. 2	at Miami	W 3–1	8–0–0 (1–0–0)	Cobb Stadium (389); Coral Gables, FL
September 15; 12:00 p.m., ACCN	No. 2	Wake Forest	L 0–3	8–1–0 (1–1–0)	Klöckner Stadium (1,402); Charlottesville, VA
September 22; 7:00 p.m., ACCNX	No. 14	No. 16 Notre Dame	L 0–1	8–2–0 (1–2–0)	Klöckner Stadium (1,311); Charlottesville, VA
September 27; 7:00 p.m., ACCNX	No. 19	at No. 4 North Carolina	L 2–3	8–3–0 (1–3–0)	Dorrance Field (2,979); Chapel Hill, NC
October 3; 7:00 p.m., ACCNX	No. 25	at No. 2 Duke	L 1–3	8–4–0 (1–4–0)	Koskinen Stadium (879); Durham, NC
October 10; 7:00 p.m., ACCN	No. 25	NC State	W 3–0	9–4–0 (2–4–0)	Klöckner Stadium (1,244); Charlottesville, VA
October 13; 1:00 p.m., ACCNX	No. 25	SMU	W 2–1	10–4–0 (3–4–0)	Klöckner Stadium (1,405); Charlottesville, VA
October 17; 7:00 p.m., ESPNU	No. 23	at No. 22 Florida State	L 0–4	10–5–0 (3–5–0)	Seminole Soccer Complex (1,234); Tallahassee, FL
October 25; 7:00 p.m., ACCNX	No. 24	Clemson	W 1–0	11–5–0 (4–5–0)	Klöckner Stadium (1,956); Charlottesville, VA
October 31; 8:00 p.m., ACCN		at No. 12 Virginia Tech; Rivalry	W 1–0	12–5–0 (5–5–0)	Thompson Field (1,056); Blacksburg, VA
NCAA tournament
November 15; 7:00 p.m., ESPN+	(4)	Princeton; First Round	W 2–1	13–5–0	Klöckner Stadium (1,120); Charlottesville, VA
November 22; 5:00 p.m., ESPN+	(4)	(5) Wisconsin; Second Round	T 0–0 (2–4 PKs)	13–5–1	McAlister Field (178); Los Angeles, CA
*Non-conference game. ^{#}Rankings from United Soccer Coaches. (#) Tournament seedings in parentheses. All times are in Eastern.

== Awards and honors ==
Recipient	Award	Date	Ref.
Maggie Cagle	Pre-season All-ACC Team	August 8, 2024	
Lia Godfrey	Pre-season All-ACC Team	August 8, 2024	
Tatum Galvin	ACC Defensive Player of the Week – Week 1	August 20, 2024	
Maggie Cagle	ACC Co-Offensive Player of the Week – Week 2	August 27, 2024	
Victoria Safradin	ACC Defensive Player of the Week – Week 2	August 27, 2024	
Maggie Cagle	All-ACC Third Team	November 6, 2024	

== Rankings ==
Ranking movements Legend: ██ Increase in ranking ██ Decrease in ranking — = Not ranked RV = Received votes т = Tied with team above or below
	Week																	
Poll	Pre	1	2	3	4	5	6	7	8	9	10	11	12	13	14	15	16	Final
United Soccer	RV	21т	7	4	2	14	19	25	25	23	24	RV	Not released					RV
TopDrawer Soccer	23	22	5	3	2	8	10	10	—	—	—	—	—	—	—	—	—	—
