= Leah Freeman =

American soccer player (born 2002)

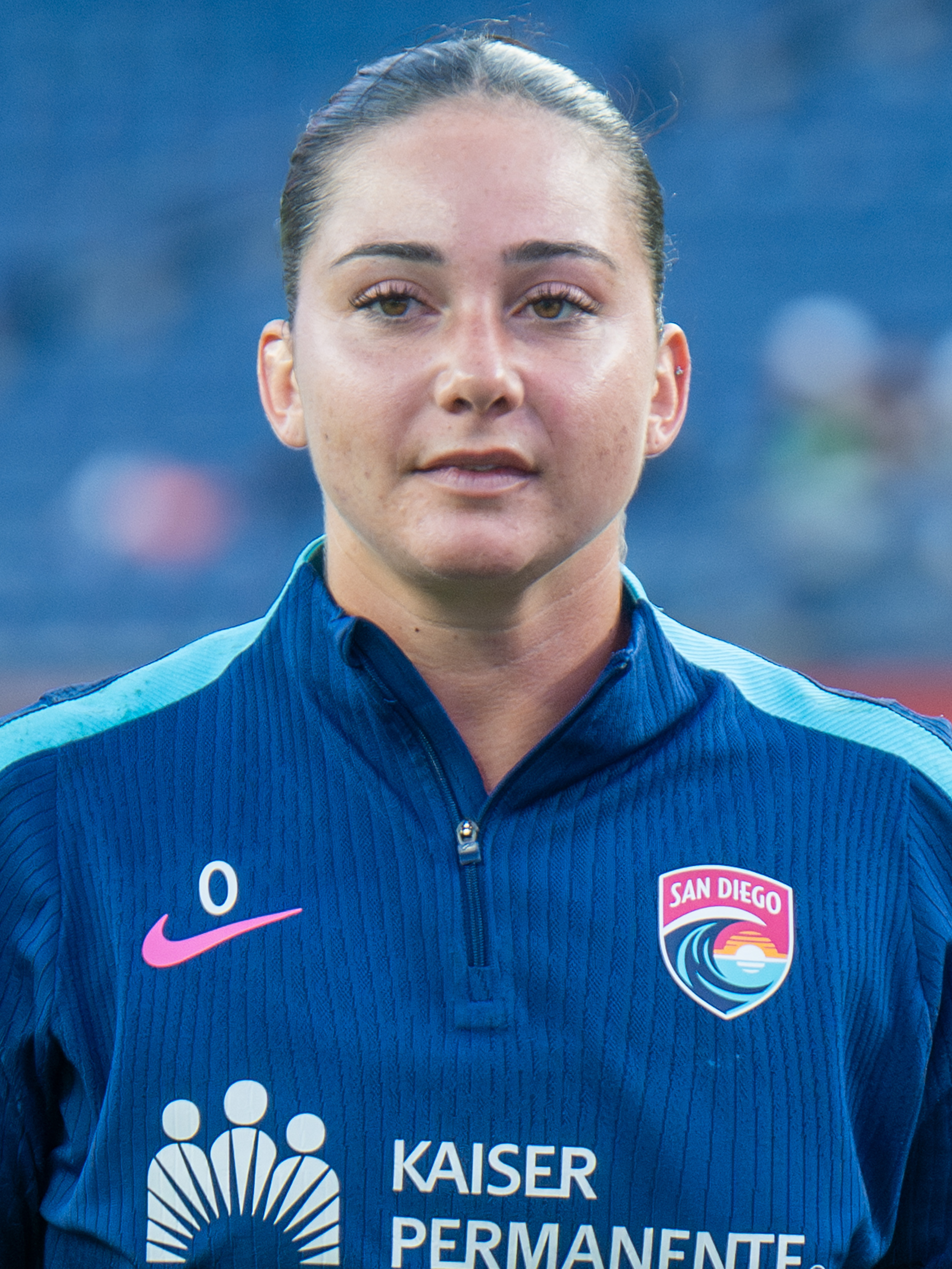
- Freeman with the San Diego Wave in 2026

Personal information
- Full name: Leah Irene McInerney Freeman
- Date of birth: February 6, 2002 (age 24)
- Place of birth: Berkeley, California, United States
- Height: 5 ft 10 in (1.78 m)
- Position: Goalkeeper

Team information
- Current team: Lazio

Youth career
- Mustang SC

College career
Years	Team	Apps	(Gls)
2020–2022	Oregon Ducks	49	(0)
2023–2024	Duke Blue Devils	37	(0)

Senior career*
Years	Team	Apps	(Gls)
2025	Bay FC	0	(0)
2026	San Diego Wave	6	(0)
2026–	Lazio	0	(0)

International career^{‡}
2020	United States U-18	1	(0)
- * Club domestic league appearances and goals as of 04:11, June 20, 2026 (UTC) ‡ National team caps and goals as of January 29, 2020

Leah Irene McInerney Freeman (born February 6, 2002) is an American professional soccer player who plays as a goalkeeper for Serie A Women club Lazio. She played college soccer for the Oregon Ducks and the Duke Blue Devils, winning both the Pac-12 and ACC Goalkeeper of the Year awards. After a stint with Bay FC, she made her professional debut for the San Diego Wave in 2026.

== Early life ==
Freeman was born in Berkeley, California, to Dale and Kerry Freeman, and has three siblings. She played club soccer for Mustang SC, which she helped reach the ECNL national semifinals in 2018. She played high school soccer for Berkeley High School, where she was named first-team All-American as a junior 2019. She committed to the University of Oregon as a freshman.

== College career ==
=== Oregon Ducks ===
Freeman became the starting goalkeeper for the Oregon Ducks as a freshman in spring 2021 after the fall season was postponed due to the COVID-19 pandemic. She set program records of single-season goals against average (0.74) and consecutive minutes without conceding a goal (more than five games), helping Oregon to its first winning season since 2006. She was named to the Pac-12 Conference all-conference third team and all-freshman team. In her sophomore season in fall 2021, she kept a program-record nine clean sheets and was named to the All-Pac 12 first team. She trained with the NWSL's Kansas City Current the following summer.

Freeman posted a career-high 114 saves as a junior in 2022, the most by any power conference goalkeeper that year, and became the first Oregon player to be named Pac-12 Goalkeeper of the Year. She made a career-high 14 saves in a shutout of rival Washington. She underwent hip surgery after the season. Oregon did not qualify for the NCAA tournament during Freeman's three years there despite two winning seasons. She left Eugene as the program leader in career clean sheets (19) and goals against average (1.05).

=== Duke Blue Devils ===
Freeman transferred to the Duke Blue Devils in 2023. She played all but one game for Duke and was named to the All-Atlantic Coast Conference third team. She saved a penalty kick by Avery Patterson in a 1–1 draw with rival North Carolina. In her final season in 2024, she helped lead Duke to the national No. 1 ranking and the ACC regular-season title, and she did not concede a goal during the NCAA tournament until the semifinals where they lost to North Carolina. She was named first-team All-ACC, first-team All-American, and the ACC Goalkeeper of the Year, becoming the first college soccer player to win that award in two different conferences.

== Club career ==
Bay FC announced on July 18, 2025, that the club had signed Freeman to her first professional contract through the end of the season. She replaced the injured Melissa Lowder as the third-stringer for Bay behind starter Jordan Silkowitz and backup Emmie Allen.

San Diego Wave FC announced on January 12, 2026, that they had signed Freeman to a one-year contract. Following an injury to DiDi Haračić, she won the start over Luisa Agudelo and made her professional debut in a 2–1 win over the Utah Royals on March 22. One week later, she kept her first professional clean sheet in a 2–0 win over Chicago Stars. Supporting a strong San Diego defense, she contributed to five wins from six appearances before being made third-stringer behind a recovered Haračić and Agudelo. Shortly after the Wave signed Sandra Paños, Freeman agreed to a mutual contract termination on July 23.

The following day, Italian club Lazio announced the signing of Freeman.

== International career ==
Freeman trained with the United States national under-16, under-18, and under-20 teams, appearing in one friendly for the under-18s against Norway in 2020. She was called up to the under-23 team, for a training camp concurrent with the senior national team, in October 2025.

== Honors and awards ==
Duke Blue Devils

- Atlantic Coast Conference: 2024

Individual

- First-team All-American: 2024
- ACC Goalkeeper of the Year: 2024
- Pac-12 Goalkeeper of the Year: 2022
- First-team All-ACC: 2024
- First-team All-Pac-12: 2021, 2022
- Third-team All-ACC: 2023
- Third-team All-Pac-12: 2020
