= Sierra Sythe =

American soccer player (born 2005)

- Sythe with Wake Forest in 2026

Personal information
- Date of birth: February 18, 2005 (age 21)
- Height: 5 ft 6 in (1.68 m)
- Position: Right back

Team information
- Current team: Wake Forest Demon Deacons
- Number: 19

Youth career
- Beach FC

College career
Years	Team	Apps	(Gls)
2023–	Wake Forest Demon Deacons	54	(14)

International career
2026–	United States U-23		

Sierra Sythe (born February 18, 2005) is an American college soccer player who plays as a right back for the Wake Forest Demon Deacons. She was named ACC Defensive Player of the Year in 2026.

== Early life ==
Sythe grew up in Long Beach, California, one of two daughters born to Maribeth and Andy Sythe. Her mother played college soccer for Dayton and Wright State; her father ran track for San Diego State and was the longtime head track coach at Long Beach State. Sythe began playing soccer with the AYSO at age four. She later played DA club soccer for Beach FC. She played high school soccer for two years at Millikan High School, earning first-team All-CIF-SS honors. She committed to play for the Wake Forest Demon Deacons during her junior year.

== College career ==
Sythe missed her entire freshman season with the Wake Forest Demon Deacons after tearing her anterior cruciate ligament (ACL). She then played in all 24 games, starting 18, and scored 3 goals in her redshirt freshman season in 2024. Previously a winger, she established herself at right back and helped Wake Forest reach its first national championship game, losing to North Carolina. She started all 20 games as a sophomore in 2025, scoring 3 goals and leading the Demon Deacons with 9 assists. She was named ACC Defensive Player of the Year following her junior year in 2026.

== International career ==
Sythe was called into United States national team development camp, training concurrently with the senior national team, in January 2026.

== Honors and awards ==
Wake Forest Demon Deacons

- NCAA Division I tournament runner-up: 2024

Individual

- ACC Defensive Player of the Year: 2026
- First-team All-ACC: 2026
