= Olivia Thomas (soccer) =

American soccer player (born 2005)

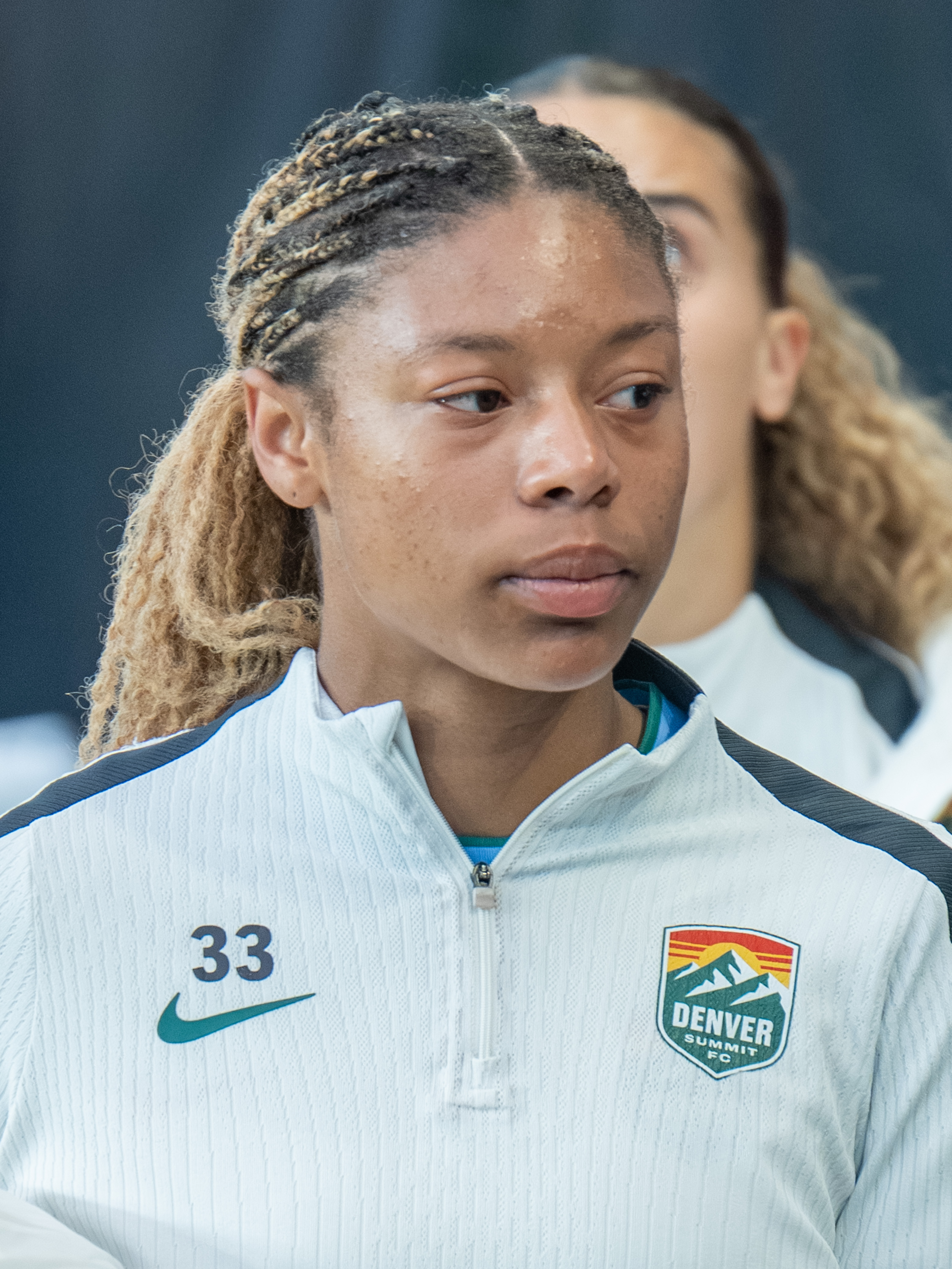
- Thomas with the Denver Summit in 2026

Personal information
- Full name: Olivia Hylton Thomas
- Date of birth: April 16, 2005 (age 21)
- Place of birth: Grosse Pointe, Michigan
- Height: 5 ft 10 in (1.78 m)
- Position: Forward

Team information
- Current team: Denver Summit
- Number: 33

Youth career
- 2016–2023: Michigan Hawks

College career
Years	Team	Apps	(Gls)
2023–2025	North Carolina Tar Heels	49	(23)

Senior career*
Years	Team	Apps	(Gls)
2024	North Carolina Courage U23	4	(2)
2026–	Denver Summit	24	(2)
- * Club domestic league appearances and goals as of 06:41, November 8, 2026 (UTC)

Olivia Hylton Thomas (born April 16, 2005) is an American professional soccer player who plays as a forward for Denver Summit FC of the National Women's Soccer League (NWSL). She played college soccer for the North Carolina Tar Heels, scoring the winning goal in the 2024 national championship and earning All-American honors in 2025.

== Early life ==
Thomas was raised in Grosse Pointe, Michigan, the fourth of five children born to LaShanda and Terence Thomas. Her father played college football at Albion College. Thomas began playing soccer with the Michigan Hawks at age 11. She earned ECNL All-American honors in 2021 and 2023 and helped lead the Hawks to the ECNL under-19 national title game in 2023. She attended University Liggett School, where she played two all-state seasons of field hockey and track and one season of soccer in her senior year. She committed to the North Carolina Tar Heels as a junior.

== College career ==
Thomas played in 10 games and scored 1 goal for the North Carolina Tar Heels as a freshman in 2023, but missed much of the later part of the season due to a hamstring tear. In her sophomore season in 2024, she scored her first brace in a 4–3 win against Georgia. She missed eight games that year due to a different hamstring strain, but recovered to finish the season ranking second on the team with 9 goals in 19 games. She had four goals in the NCAA tournament as North Carolina won its 23rd national title and first since 2012. In the semifinals, she scored the second goal in the 3–0 win against Duke, and in the title game, she scored the lone goal off a curling free kick in the 1–0 victory over Wake Forest. She was named the tournament's Most Outstanding Offensive Player.

Thomas playing for North Carolina in 2024

Thomas led the Tar Heels with 13 goals in 20 games in her junior year in 2025. Unseeded in the NCAA tournament, the team went to the third round before losing to TCU on penalties, with Thomas missing hers. She was named first-team All-ACC and third-team All-American the end of her first injury-free season. After three seasons at North Carolina, she decided to accept a professional offer and give up her remaining year of college eligibility.

== Club career ==
NWSL expansion team Denver Summit FC announced on January 20, 2026, that they had signed Thomas to her first professional contract on a three-year deal with the mutual option for another year. She made her professional debut in the Summit's inaugural game on March 14, coming on as a halftime substitute for Emma Regan in a 2–1 loss to Bay FC. She scored her first professional goal on August 29, concluding a 6–1 victory over the Chicago Stars.

== International career ==
Thomas was called into virtual training with the United States under-17 team in February 2021. She was called into camp with the under-20 team in March 2025.

== Honors and awards ==
North Carolina Courage U23

- USL W League: 2024

North Carolina Tar Heels

- NCAA Division I women's soccer tournament: 2024

Individual

- Third-team All-American: 2025
- First-team All-ACC: 2025
- NCAA Division I Tournament Most Outstanding Offensive Player: 2024
