= Atlantic Coast Conference women's soccer awards =

The Atlantic Coast Conference (ACC) presents several annual honors for the best women's soccer players of the season. The conference currently presents individual awards for Offensive Player of the Year, Defensive Player of the Year, Midfielder of the Year, Goalkeeper of the Year, and Freshman of the Year. It also presents an award for Coach of the Year.

== Key ==
*	Awarded a national player of the year award: Hermann Trophy (1988–present); Honda Sports Award (1988–present); TopDrawerSoccer National Player of the Year (2011–present); ISAA Player of the Year (1985–1995); Soccer America Player of the Year (1985–2014)

== Player of the Year (1987–2003) ==
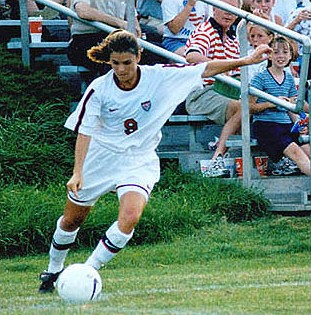
Mia Hamm, North Carolina, 3× ACC Player of the Year

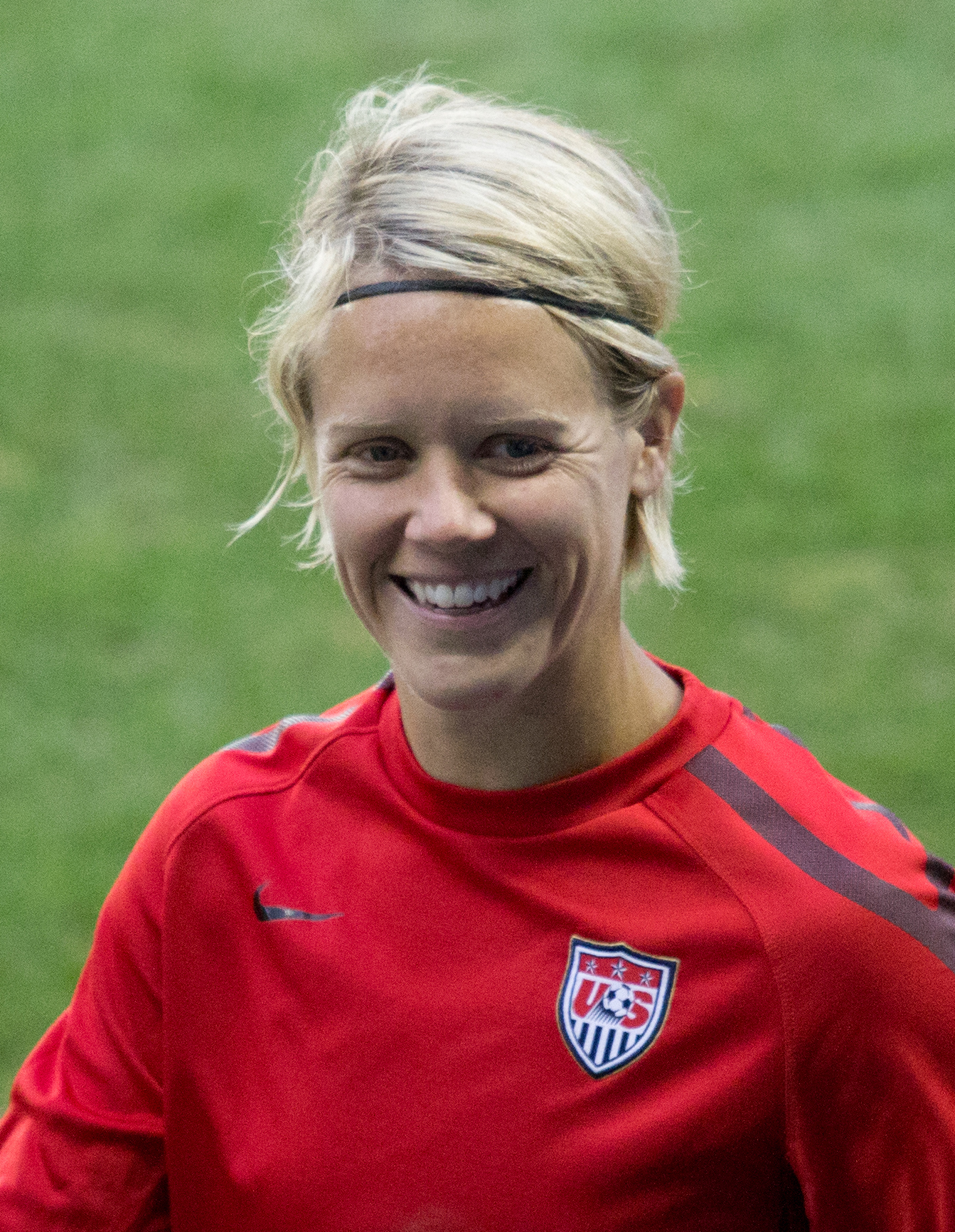
Lori Lindsey, Virginia, 2× ACC Player of the Year

Atlantic Coast Conference Player of the Year
Season	Player	School	Position	Class	Ref.
1987	Lori Henry	North Carolina	Defender	Sophomore	
1988	Linda Hamilton	NC State	Defender	Sophomore	
1989	Shannon Higgins *	North Carolina	Midfielder	Senior	
1990	Mia Hamm	North Carolina	Forward	Freshman	
1991	Kristine Lilly *	North Carolina	Midfielder	Junior	
1992	Mia Hamm (2) *	North Carolina	Forward	Junior	
1993	Mia Hamm (3) *	North Carolina	Forward	Senior	
1994	Tisha Venturini *	North Carolina	Midfielder	Senior	
1995	Kelly Walbert	Duke	Forward	Senior	
1996	Erin Taylor	Maryland	Defender	Senior	
1997	Andi Melde	Duke	Forward	Senior	
1998	Cindy Parlow *	North Carolina	Forward	Senior	
1999	Lorrie Fair *	North Carolina	Defender	Senior	
2000	Lori Lindsey	Virginia	Midfielder	Junior	
2001	Lori Lindsey (2)	Virginia	Midfielder	Senior	
2002	Deliah Arrington	Clemson	Forward	Senior	
2003	Lindsay Tarpley *	North Carolina	Midfielder/forward	Sophomore	

== Offensive Player of the Year (2004–present) ==
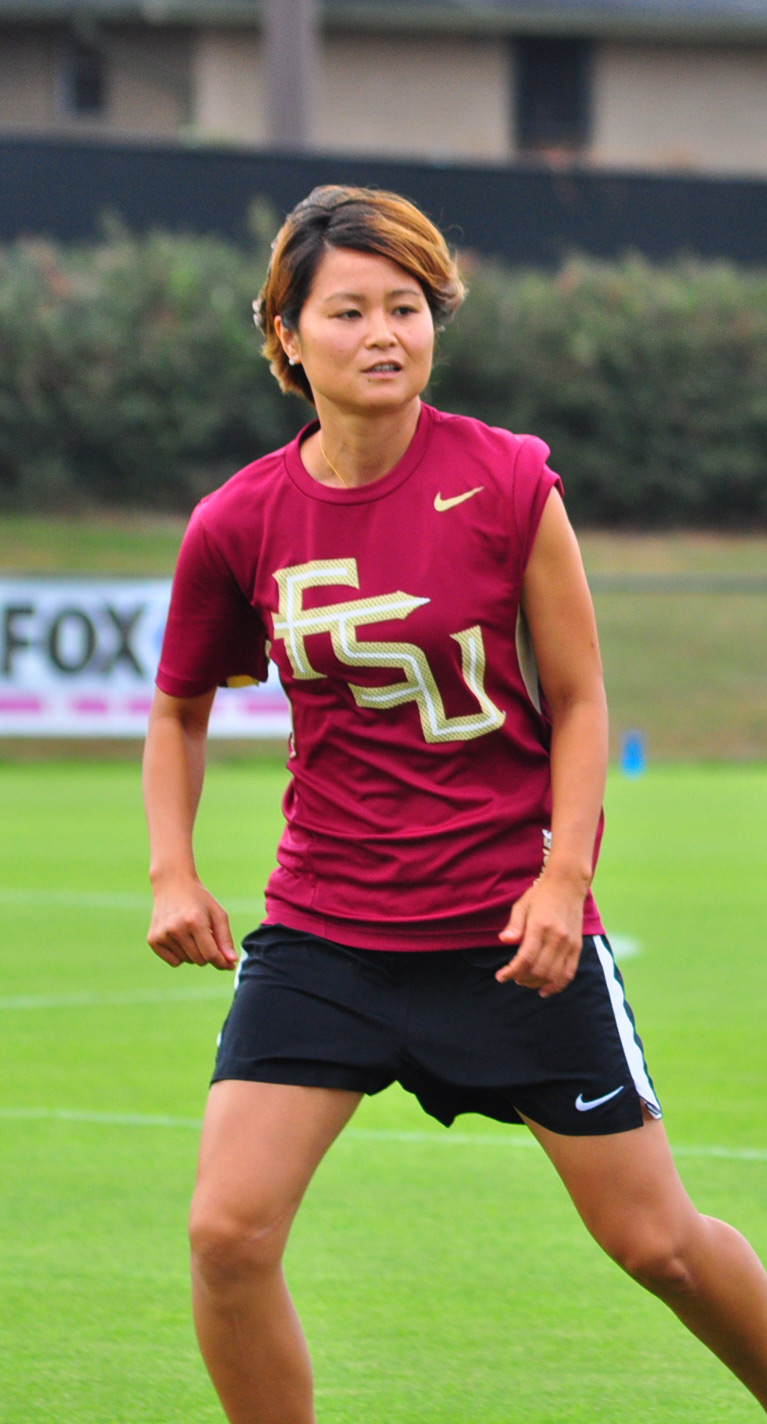
Mami Yamaguchi, Florida State, 2007 ACC Offensive Player of the Year

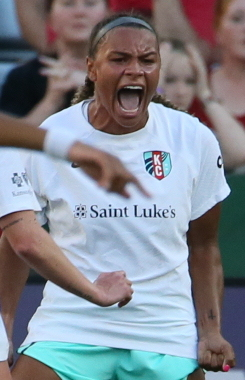
Michelle Cooper, Duke, 2022 ACC Offensive Player of the Year

Atlantic Coast Conference Offensive Player of the Year
Season	Player	School	Position	Class	Ref.
2004	Casey McCluskey	Duke	Midfielder/forward	Senior	
2005	Heather O'Reilly	North Carolina	Midfielder	Junior	
2006	Yael Averbuch	North Carolina	Forward	Sophomore	
2007	Mami Yamaguchi *	Florida State	Forward	Junior	
2008	Casey Nogueira *	North Carolina	Forward	Junior	
2009	Tiffany McCarty	Florida State	Forward	Sophomore	
2010	Sinead Farrelly	Virginia	Midfielder	Senior	
2011	Katie Stengel	Wake Forest	Forward	Sophomore	
2012	Caroline Miller	Virginia	Forward	Senior	
2013	Crystal Dunn	North Carolina	Midfielder	Senior	
2014	Dagný Brynjarsdóttir *	Florida State	Midfielder	Senior	
2015	Makenzy Doniak	Virginia	Forward	Senior	
2016	Alexis Shaffer	Virginia	Midfielder	Senior	
2017	Imani Dorsey	Duke	Midfielder/forward	Senior	
2018	Alessia Russo	North Carolina	Forward	Sophomore	
2019	Deyna Castellanos	Florida State	Midfielder/forward	Senior	
2020	Emina Ekic	Louisville	Midfielder	Senior	
2021	Diana Ordóñez	Virginia	Forward	Junior	
2022	Michelle Cooper *	Duke	Forward	Sophomore	
2023	Onyi Echegini *	Florida State	Midfielder	Fifth-year senior	
2024	Karlie Lema	California	Forward	Senior	
2025	Izzy Engle	Notre Dame	Forward	Sophomore	
2026	Bella Devey	North Carolina	Forward	Sophomore	

== Defensive Player of the Year (2004–present) ==
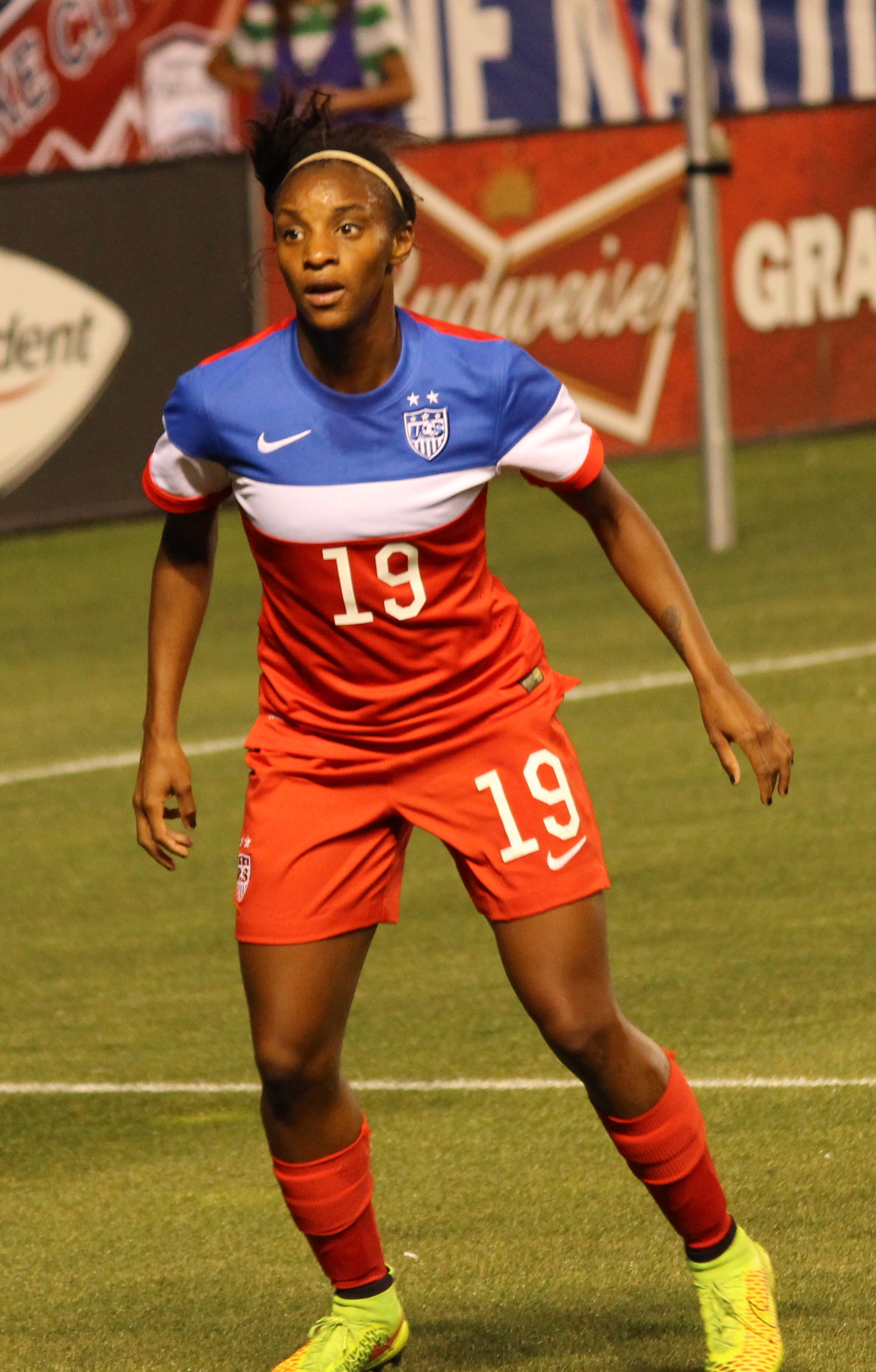
Crystal Dunn, North Carolina, 2× ACC Defensive of the Year

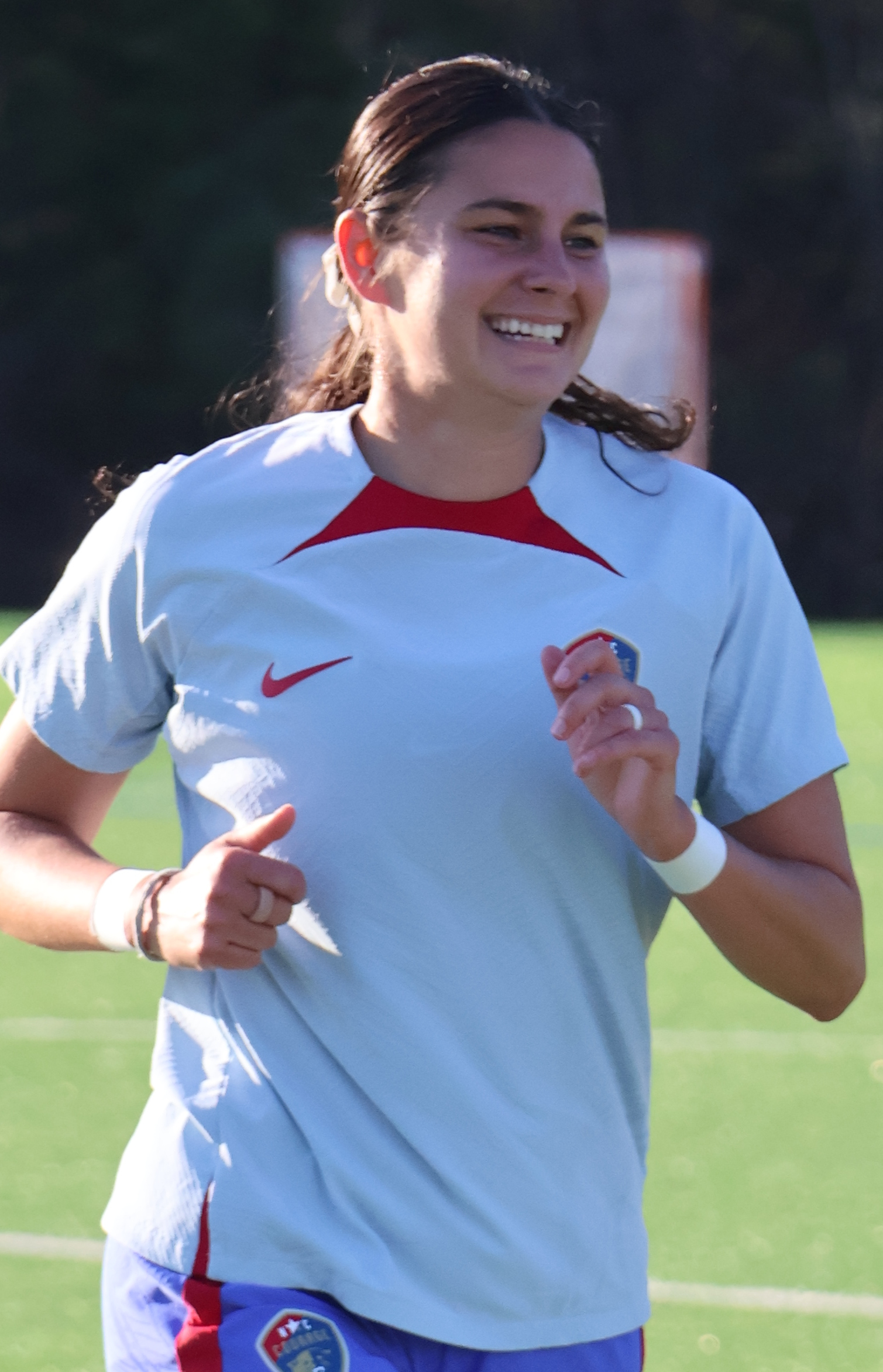
Malia Berkely, Florida State, 2× ACC Defensive Player of the Year

Atlantic Coast Conference Defensive Player of the Year
Season	Player	School	Position	Class	Ref.
2004	Sarah Huffman	Virginia	Defender	Junior	
2005	Carolyn Ford	Duke	Defender	Senior	
2006	Laura Georges	Boston College	Defender	Senior	
2007	Becky Sauerbrunn	Virginia	Defender	Senior	
2008	Nikki Krzysik	Virginia	Defender	Senior	
2009	Whitney Engen *	North Carolina	Defender	Senior	
2010	Crystal Dunn	North Carolina	Defender/midfielder	Freshman	
2011	Natasha Anasi	Duke	Defender	Sophomore	
2012	Crystal Dunn (2) *	North Carolina	Defender/midfielder	Junior	
2013	Kassey Kallman	Florida State	Defender	Senior	
2014	Kristin Grubka	Florida State	Defender	Senior	
2015	Emily Sonnett	Virginia	Defender	Senior	
2016	Christina Gibbons	Duke	Defender/midfielder	Senior	
2017	Schuyler DeBree	Duke	Defender	Senior	
2018	Sam Staab	Clemson	Defender	Senior	
2019	Malia Berkely	Florida State	Defender	Junior	
2020	Malia Berkely (2)	Florida State	Defender	Senior	
2021	Emily Madril	Florida State	Defender	Senior	
2022	Eva Gaetino	Notre Dame	Defender	Junior	
2023	Eva Gaetino (2)	Notre Dame	Defender	Senior	
2024	Cameron Roller	Duke	Defender	Sophomore	
2025	Elise Evans	Stanford	Defender	Senior	
2026	Sierra Sythe	Wake Forest	Defender	Junior	

== Midfielder of the Year (2014–present) ==
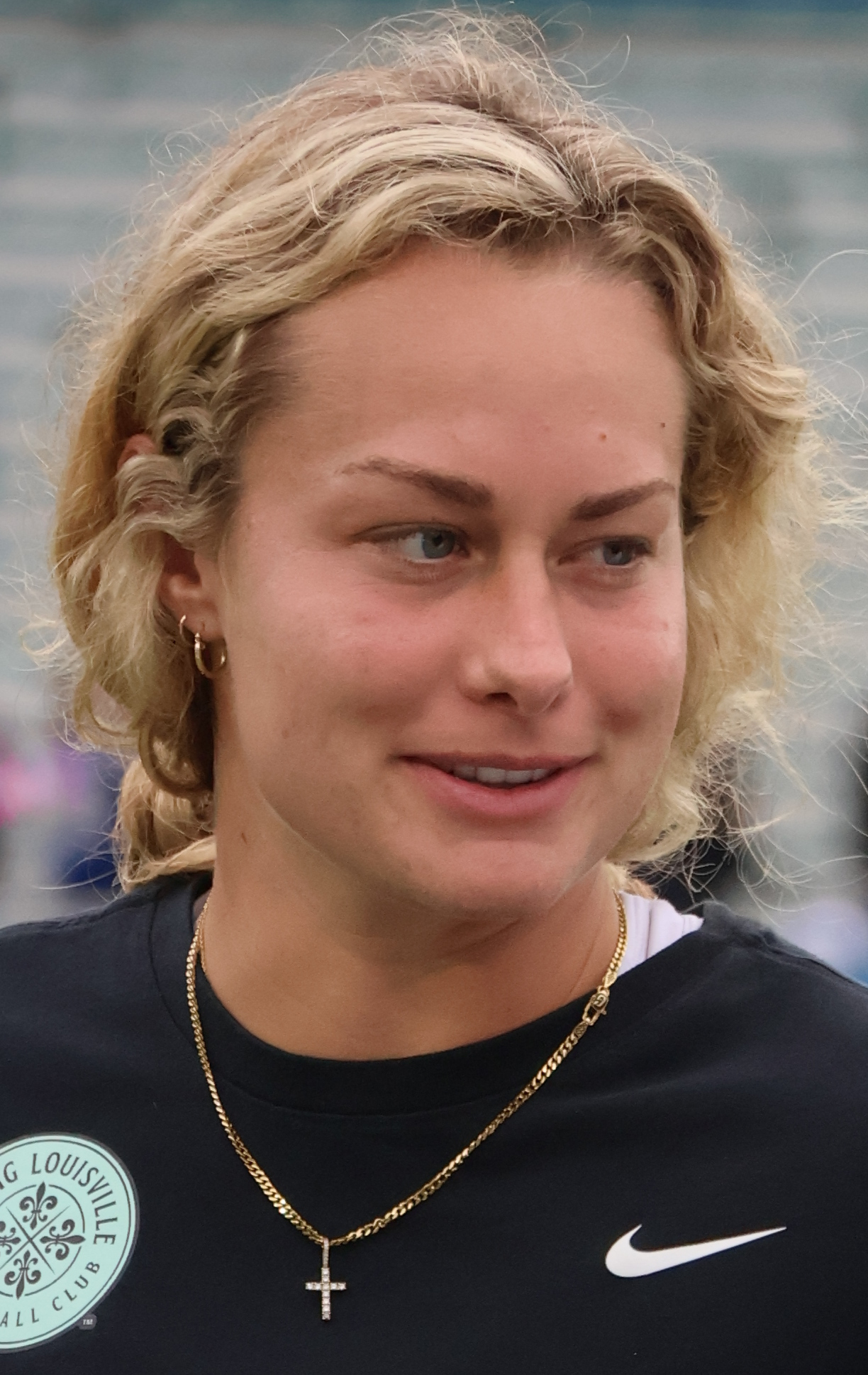
Jaelin Howell, Florida State, 2× ACC Midfielder of the Year

Atlantic Coast Conference Midfielder of the Year
Season	Player	School	Class	Ref.
2014	Danielle Colaprico	Virginia	Senior	
2015	Megan Connolly	Florida State	Freshman	
2016	Alexis Shaffer	Virginia	Senior	
2017	Quinn	Duke	Senior	
2018	Sam Coffey	Boston College	Sophomore	
2019	Deyna Castellanos	Florida State	Senior	
2020	Jaelin Howell *	Florida State	Junior	
2021	Jaelin Howell (2) *	Florida State	Senior	
2022	Korbin Albert *	Notre Dame	Sophomore	
2023	Ally Sentnor	North Carolina	Sophomore	
2024	Maggie Graham	Duke	Graduate	
2025	Lia Godfrey	Virginia	Graduate	
2026	Lily Joseph	Notre Dame	Junior	

== Goalkeeper of the Year (2022–present) ==
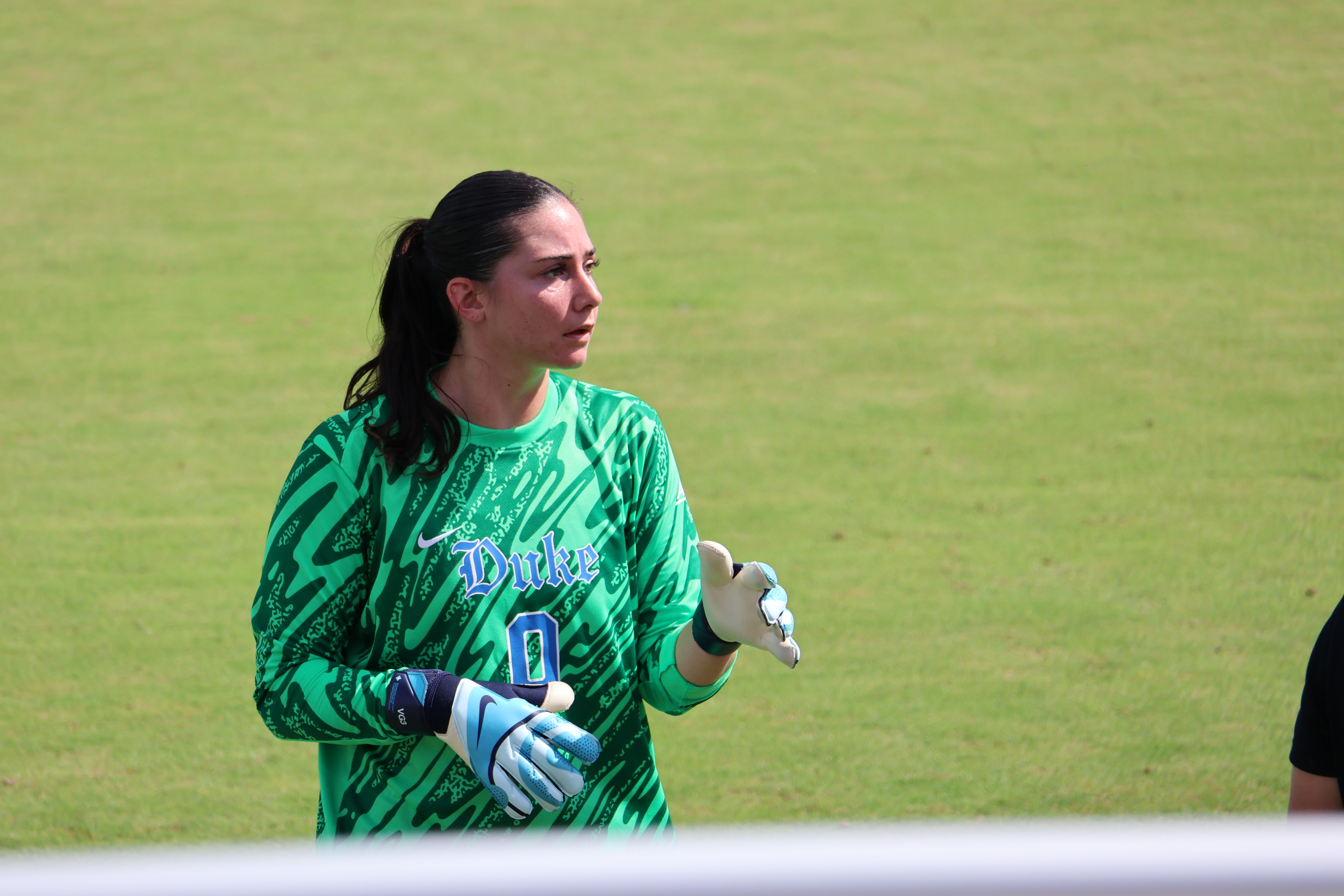
Leah Freeman, Duke, 2024 ACC Goalkeeper of the Year

Atlantic Coast Conference Goalkeeper of the Year
Season	Player	School	Class	Ref.
2022	Cristina Roque	Florida State	Junior	
2023	Halle Mackiewicz	Clemson	Senior	
2024	Leah Freeman	Duke	Graduate	
2025	Caroline Birkel	Stanford	Freshman	
2026	Valentina Amaral	Wake Forest	Junior	

== Freshman of the Year (1991–present) ==
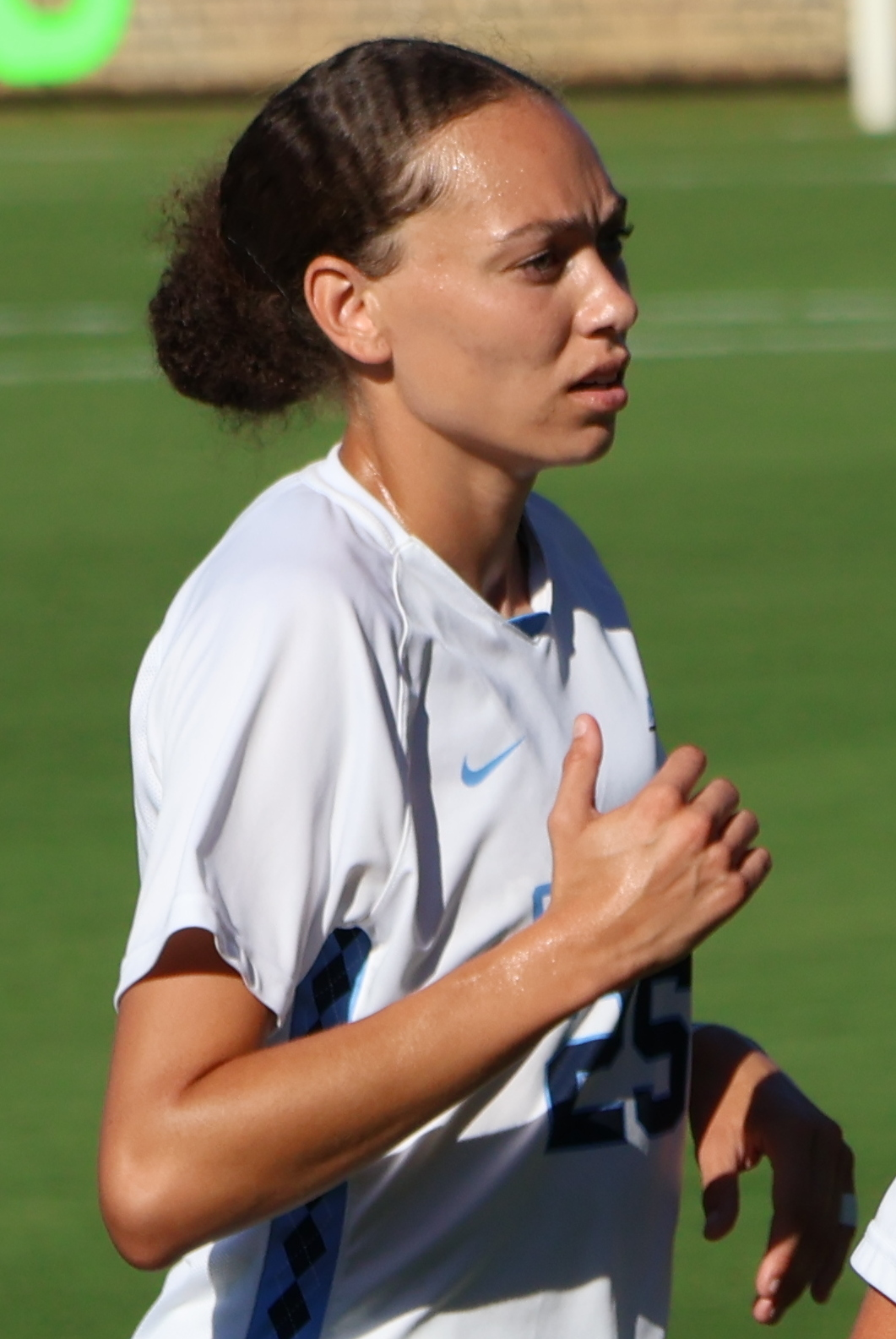
Maycee Bell, North Carolina, 2019 ACC Freshman of the Year

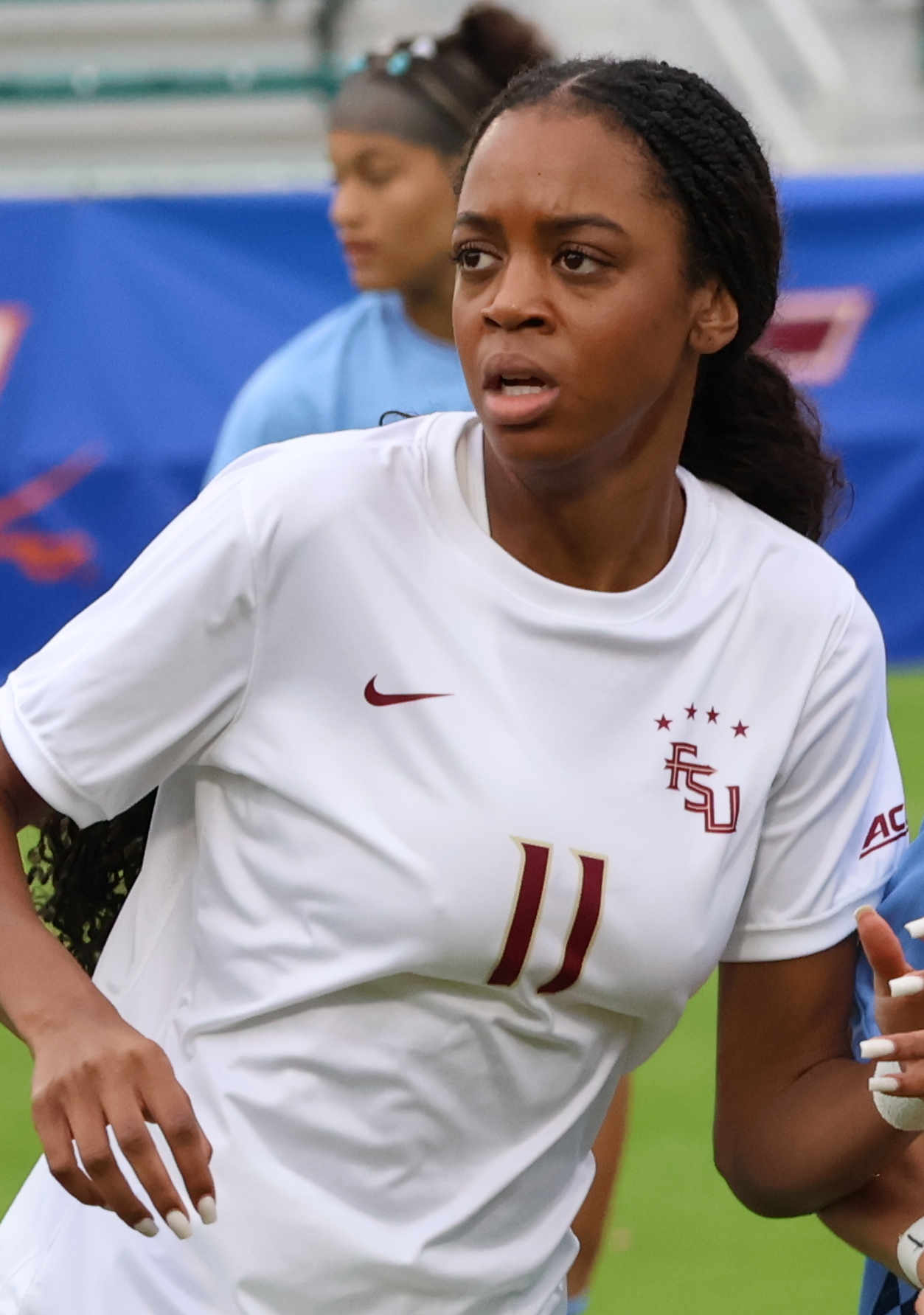
Jordynn Dudley, Florida State, 2023 ACC Freshman of the Year

Atlantic Coast Conference Freshman of the Year
Season	Player	School	Position	Ref.
1991	Tisha Venturini	North Carolina	Midfielder	
1992	Thori Staples	NC State	Defender	
1993	Debbie Keller	North Carolina	Forward	
1994	Carmie Landeen	Clemson	Midfielder	
1995	Cindy Parlow	North Carolina	Forward	
1996	Laurie Schwoy	North Carolina	Midfielder/forward	
1997	Isis Dallis	Duke	Goalkeeper	
1998	Emily Taggart	Wake Forest	Midfielder/forward	
1999	Joline Charlton	Wake Forest	Forward	
2000	Lindsay Browne	Clemson	Midfielder	
2001	Casey McCluskey	Duke	Midfielder	
2002	Lindsay Tarpley	North Carolina	Midfielder/forward	
2003	Becky Sauerbrunn	Virginia	Defender	
2004	Ashley Stinson	Virginia Tech	Forward	
2005	Jess Rostedt	Virginia	Forward	
2006	Gina DiMartino	Boston College	Forward	
2007	Brittney Steinbruch	Miami	Forward	
2008	Tiffany McCarty	Florida State	Forward	
2009	Vicki DiMartino	Boston College	Forward	
2010	Katie Stengel	Wake Forest	Forward	
2011	Morgan Brian	Virginia	Midfielder	
2012	Cassie Pecht	Duke	Midfielder/forward	
2013	Morgan Andrews	Notre Dame	Midfielder	
2014	Megan Buckingham	North Carolina	Midfielder/forward	
2015	Megan Connolly	Florida State	Midfielder	
2016	Bridgette Andrzejewski	North Carolina	Forward	
2017	Emina Ekic	Louisville	Midfielder	
2017	Alessia Russo	North Carolina	Forward	
2018	Zhao Yujie *	Florida State	Midfielder	
2019	Maycee Bell	North Carolina	Defender	
2020	Lia Godfrey *	Virginia	Midfielder	
2021	Michelle Cooper *	Duke	Forward	
2022	Kat Rader	Duke	Forward	
2023	Jordynn Dudley *	Florida State	Forward	
2024	Izzy Engle	Notre Dame	Midfielder/forward	
2025	Kylie Maxwell	Wake Forest	Forward	
2026	Cali O'Neill	North Carolina	Defender	

== Coach of the Year (1987–present) ==
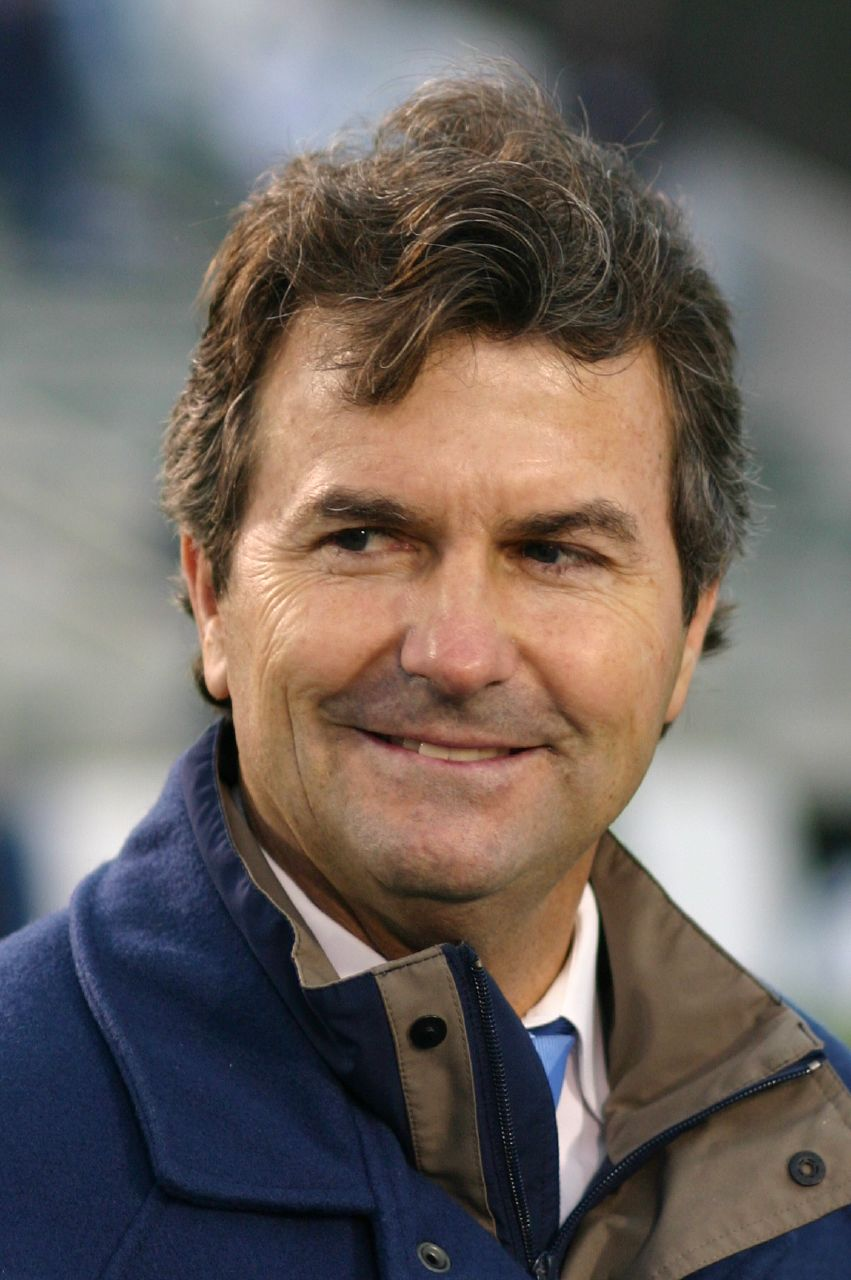
Anson Dorrance, North Carolina, 12× ACC Coach of the Year

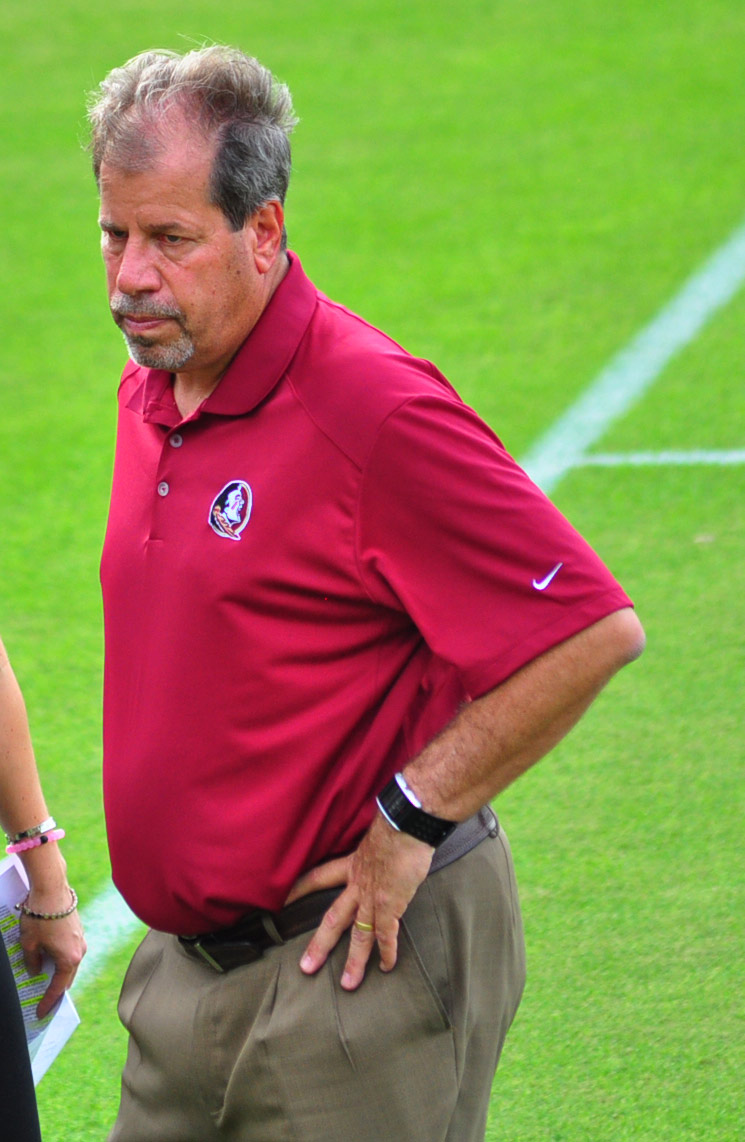
Mark Krikorian, Florida State, 5× ACC Coach of the Year

Atlantic Coast Conference Coach of the Year
Season	Coach	School	Ref.
1987	Anson Dorrance	North Carolina	
1988	Larry Gross	NC State	
1989	Lauren Gregg	Virginia	
1990	Anson Dorrance (2)	North Carolina	
1991	Anson Dorrance (3)	North Carolina	
1992	Bill Hempen	Duke	
1993	Anson Dorrance (4)	North Carolina	
1994	Bill Hempen (2)	Duke	
1995	April Heinrichs	Maryland	
1996	Alvin Corneal	NC State	
1996	Anson Dorrance (5)	North Carolina	
1997	Bill Hempen (3)	Duke	
1998	Tony da Luz	Wake Forest	
1999	Shannon Cirovski	Maryland	
2000	Ray Leone	Clemson	
2001	Anson Dorrance (6)	North Carolina	
2002	Shannon Cirovski (2)	Maryland	
2003	Anson Dorrance (7)	North Carolina	
2004	Anson Dorrance (8)	North Carolina	
2005	Mark Krikorian	Florida State	
2006	Anson Dorrance (9)	North Carolina	
2007	Tricia Taliaferro	Maryland	
2008	Anson Dorrance (10)	North Carolina	
2009	Mark Krikorian (2)	Florida State	
2010	Brian Pensky	Maryland	
2011	Robbie Church	Duke	
2012	Mark Krikorian (3)	Florida State	
2013	Steve Swanson	Virginia	
2014	Mark Krikorian (4)	Florida State	
2015	Steve Swanson (2)	Virginia	
2016	Eddie Radwanski	Clemson	
2017	Robbie Church (2)	Duke	
2018	Anson Dorrance (11)	North Carolina	
2019	Anson Dorrance (12)	North Carolina	
2020	Mark Krikorian (5)	Florida State	
2021	Steve Swanson (3)	Virginia	
2022	Nate Norman	Notre Dame	
2023	Brian Pensky (2)	Florida State	
2024	Robbie Church (3)	Duke	
2025	Paul Ratcliffe	Stanford	
2026	Nate Norman (2)	Notre Dame	

== See also ==
- Big 12 Conference women's soccer awards
- Big Ten Conference women's soccer awards
- Pac-12 Conference women's soccer awards
- Southeastern Conference women's soccer awards
