= Clare Gagne =

American soccer player (born 2002)

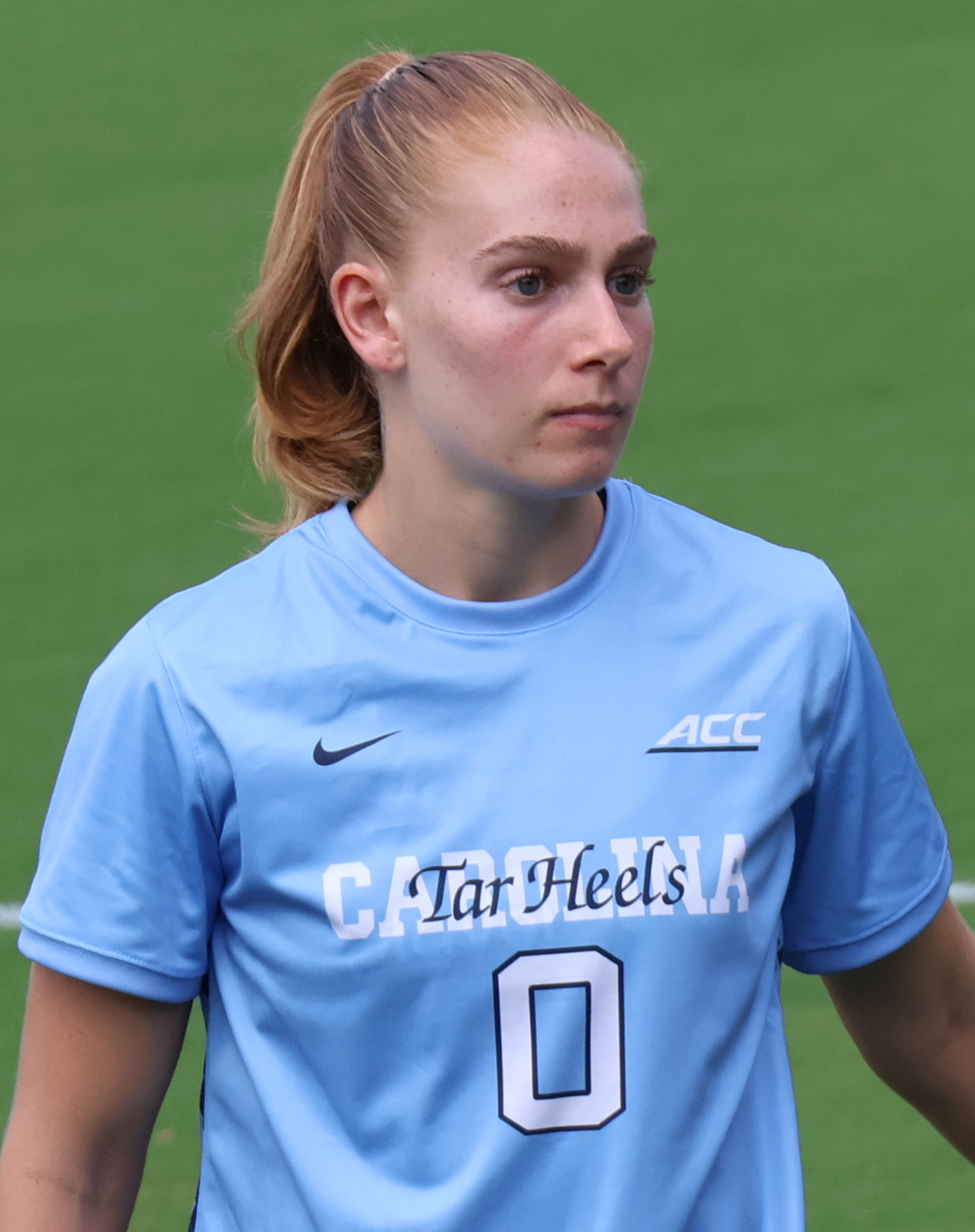
- Gagne with North Carolina in 2024

Personal information
- Full name: Clare Wilson Gagne
- Date of birth: February 22, 2002 (age 24)
- Height: 6 ft 0 in (1.83 m)
- Position: Goalkeeper

Team information
- Current team: Kansas City Current
- Number: 0

Youth career
- 2014–2019: Minnesota Thunder
- 2016–2019: Orono Spartans

College career
Years	Team	Apps	(Gls)
2021–2023	Brown Bears	28	(0)
2024	North Carolina Tar Heels	27	(0)

Senior career*
Years	Team	Apps	(Gls)
2025–	Kansas City Current	0	(0)
- * Club domestic league appearances and goals

Clare Wilson Gagne (/ˈɡæɡni/ GAG-nee; born February 22, 2002) is an American professional soccer player who plays as a goalkeeper for the Kansas City Current of the National Women's Soccer League (NWSL). She played college soccer for the Brown Bears and the North Carolina Tar Heels, helping lead the Tar Heels to the 2024 national championship. She was named the tournament's Most Outstanding Defensive Player.

== Early life ==
Gagne grew up in Orono, Minnesota, one of four children born to Stacey Wilson and Steve Gagne. She attended Orono High School, where she captained the soccer team, earned all-state honors two times, and helped reach three state championship games. She played ECNL club soccer for the Minnesota Thunder Academy. She was ranked as the fifth-best goalkeeper of the 2020 class.

== College career ==
After her freshman season was cancelled due to the COVID-19 pandemic in 2020, Gagne shared goalkeeping duties for the Brown Bears for the next two seasons. She played in 2 games in 2021, then made 10 appearances with 7 starts in 2022. She then became the undisputed starter in her senior year in 2023, posting 7 clean sheets in 15 starts. Gagne won the Ivy League regular-season championship all three seasons she played for the Bears.

After four years in Providence, Gagne transferred to the North Carolina Tar Heels as a graduate student for her final season in 2024. New teammate Maddie Dahlien, also from Minnesota, helped recruit her when she was in the transfer portal. She started all 27 games for the Tar Heels and kept 13 clean sheets (third in the nation). She was nicknamed "Air Clare" for her heroic performances. She made 74 saves on the season with a career-high 13 in a 4–2 loss to Florida State. In the NCAA tournament, she saved a penalty kick against Santa Clara in a tight 1–0 win in the second round. She ended up allowing only one goal in six NCAA tournament games, shutting out Duke 3–0 in the semifinals and Wake Forest 1–0 in the final, as North Carolina won its 23rd national title and first since 2012. She was named the tournament's Most Outstanding Defensive Player. TopDrawerSoccer named her to their second-team Best XI and ranked her as 23rd-best player and second-best goalkeeper in the nation.

== Club career ==
The Kansas City Current announced on January 8, 2025, that they had signed Gagne to her first professional contract on a one-year deal. She joined Brazilian starter Lorena and backup Laurel Ivory as the third-stringer in the club's new-look goalkeeping pool. After suffering a head injury in training, she was placed on the season-ending injury list in September. Kansas City won the NWSL Shield with the best record in the league.

On January 9, 2026, Gagne re-signed with the Current on a one-year contract.

== Honors and awards ==
Brown Bears

- Ivy League: 2021, 2022, 2023

North Carolina Tar Heels

- NCAA Division I women's soccer tournament: 2024

Kansas City Current

- NWSL Championship: 2026
- NWSL Shield: 2025

Individual

- NCAA Division I Tournament Most Outstanding Defensive Player: 2024
