= Emily Colton =

American soccer player (born 2003)

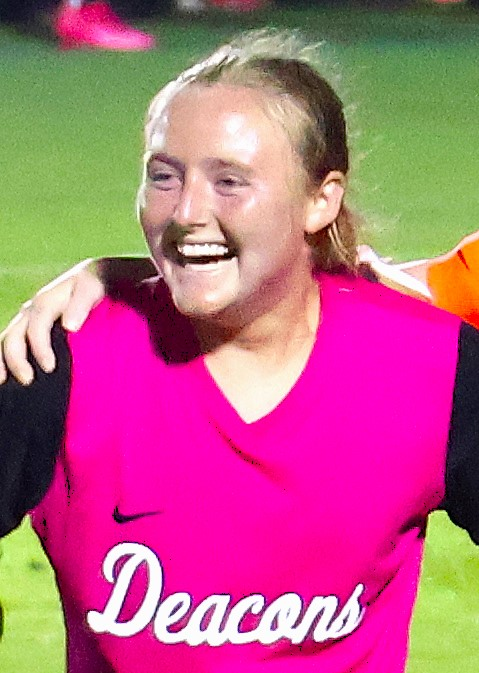
- Colton with Wake Forest in 2024

Personal information
- Full name: Emily Margaret Colton
- Date of birth: June 23, 2003 (age 23)
- Place of birth: Carlsbad, California, U.S.
- Height: 5 ft 3 in (1.60 m)
- Position: Midfielder

Team information
- Current team: DC Power FC
- Number: 5

Youth career
- City SC San Diego
- LA Galaxy San Diego

College career
Years	Team	Apps	(Gls)
2021–2023	North Carolina Tar Heels	67	(10)
2024	Wake Forest Demon Deacons	24	(7)

Senior career*
Years	Team	Apps	(Gls)
2025–	DC Power FC	50	(4)

International career
2019	United States U-17	1	(0)
2022	United States U-20	9	(3)
- * Club domestic league appearances and goals as of November 11, 2026

Emily Margaret Colton (born June 23, 2003) is an American professional soccer player who plays as a midfielder for USL Super League team DC Power FC. She played college soccer for the North Carolina Tar Heels and the Wake Forest Demon Deacons, helping both teams to national title game appearances.

== Early life ==
Colton grew up in Carlsbad, California, the daughter of Jeffery and Debra Colton, and has two sisters. She and her twin sister, Abbie, began playing soccer when they were five years old. Colton played club soccer for City SC in San Diego for twelve years before moving to LA Galaxy San Diego. She attended La Costa Canyon High School, where she played basketball. Coming out of high school, she was ranked by IMG Academy as the fifth-best player of the 2021 class.

== College career ==
=== North Carolina Tar Heels ===
Colton played three seasons for the North Carolina Tar Heels and started all 67 games for the team, scoring 10 goals and providing 8 assists. In her freshman season in 2021, she led the Tar Heels in scoring with 7 goals in 18 games and named to the TopDrawerSoccer Freshman Best XI second team. In her sophomore season in 2022, she helped North Carolina to the finals of both the ACC tournament and the NCAA tournament. In the national title game, she assisted Avery Patterson's second goal in a loss to UCLA. Her junior season in 2023 ended in the quarterfinals of the NCAA tournament.

=== Wake Forest Demon Deacons ===
Colton transferred to the Wake Forest Demon Deacons for her fourth and final season in 2024, joining her sister Abbie. She started all 24 games and scored 7 goals with 7 assists—both marks tied with or behind only Caiya Hanks and Emily Murphy. Her assist against No. 2–ranked Virginia and her lone goal against No. 1 Stanford made Wake Forest the first team to defeat the top two ranked teams consecutively. She also helped defeat defending national champions Florida State 4–1, ending their 32–game unbeaten streak. She ranked second in the nation in TopDrawerSoccer's midseason player rankings. In the NCAA tournament, she helped lead Wake Forest to its first national title game in program history, beating Stanford 1–0 in the semifinals before losing 1–0 to her former team North Carolina in the final. She was named second-team All-ACC, third-team United Soccer Coaches All-American, and second-team TopDrawerSoccer All-American at the end of the season.

== Club career ==
USL Super League club DC Power FC announced on January 31, 2025, that the club had signed Colton to her first professional contract on a two-year deal. She made her professional debut on February 23, starting and playing the full 90 minutes in a 3–3 draw with the Carolina Ascent. She recorded her first professional assist on April 26, setting up Gianna Gourley in a 1–0 win against Brooklyn FC.

On August 30, 2025, Colton scored her first professional goal for DC, opening the scoring in a 2–2 draw against the Spokane Zephyr. On January 7, 2026, she signed a one-year contract extension through the following season. She was named to the All-League First Team at the end of the season, having led the league in chances created.

On November 11, 2026, Colton led DC to clinch a playoff berth for the first time after a 4–0 win over Brooklyn FC; she provided three assists in the match, becoming the second player in the league to do so in a single match (after Jilly Shimkin).

== International career ==
Colton was called into training camps with the United States under-15 team in 2018 and the under-17 team in 2019. With the under-20 team, she won the 2022 Sud Ladies Cup and the 2022 CONCACAF Women's U-20 Championship, which qualified the team for the 2022 FIFA U-20 Women's World Cup. In the qualifiers, she scored 3 goals and led the United States with 5 assists in 7 games and was named to the all-tournament team.

== Honors and awards ==
North Carolina Tar Heels

- Atlantic Coast Conference: 2022

United States U-20

- CONCACAF Women's U-20 Championship: 2022
- Sud Ladies Cup: 2022

Individual

- USL Super League All-League First Team: 2025–26
- Third-team All-American: 2024
- Second-team All-ACC: 2024
- ACC all-freshman team: 2021
