= Malaika Meena =

English footballer (born 2003)

Personal information
- Full name: Malaika Sia Meena
- Date of birth: 9 March 2003 (age 23)
- Place of birth: Slough, England
- Height: 1.68 m (5 ft 6 in)
- Position: Midfielder

Team information
- Current team: Bristol City
- Number: 18

Youth career
- Burnham
- Chelsea
- Arsenal

College career
Years	Team	Apps	(Gls)
2021–2024	Wake Forest Demon Deacons	65	(2)

Senior career*
Years	Team	Apps	(Gls)
2025–	Bristol City	21	(1)
2026	→ Ipswich Town (loan)	5	(0)

International career^{‡}
2025	England U23	1	(0)
- * Club domestic league appearances and goals as of 15:53, 24 October 2026 (UTC) ‡ National team caps and goals as of 15:53, 24 October 2026 (UTC)

Malaika Sia Meena (born 9 March 2003) is a professional footballer who plays as a midfielder for Women's Super League 2 club Bristol City. Born in England and having represented her country of birth at the youth international level, she has been called up to the Tanzania national team. She played college soccer for the Wake Forest Demon Deacons and helped the team reach its first national title game appearance.

== Early life ==
Meena was born and raised in Slough, England. She received an education at Cox Green School in the nearby town of Maidenhead. She started playing football with Burnham's boys' academy team and went on to captain the squad as a young child. From the ages of 8 to 16, she was a member of Chelsea's academy. She finished her youth career with Arsenal, where she won an FA Youth Cup and youth league title.

== College career ==
In her first season playing college soccer in the United States for the Wake Forest Demon Deacons, Meena registered a career-high 22 games, making 17 starts. She scored her first collegiate goal on 26 August 2021, contributing to a 2–0 win over VCU. The following year, she played and started in 18 matches. Then, as a junior in 2023, she helped the Demon Deacons post an undefeated home record for the first time since 2007 and post a program record for the fewest goals allowed in a season.

Early on in her senior season, Meena broke her fibula in an August 25 match against Mississippi State and was sidelined for much of the remainder of the year. She recovered in time for the postseason, making her return in Wake Forest's ACC tournament semifinal win over reigning national champions Florida State. She went on to play in all six matches of the Demon Deacon's deep NCAA tournament run and earned the start in Wake Forest's first-ever national title match, an eventual loss to North Carolina. In the quarterfinals of the competition, she converted her spot-kick in Wake Forest's penalty shootout win over USC. Meena totaled 65 appearances in her four seasons in Winston-Salem.

== Club career ==
On 30 January 2025, Meena was announced to have signed her first professional contract with Women's Championship club Bristol City on a two-and-a-half year contract that included an option for an additional year. She became the second-ever Tanzanian to play professionally in England after Aisha Masaka. In her first season with Bristol City, she recorded 1 goal in 7 matches as the team fought to earn promotion to the English top-flight. She then made 9 appearances in her second season before getting loaned out.

On 3 February 2026, on transfer deadline day, Bristol City loaned Meena out to Ipswich Town through the end of the season. Meena participated in 5 league games during her short stint, helping Ipswich Town finish in 9th place and evade relegation in its first year in the Women's Super League 2. On 2 May 2026, she played the full 90 against Sunderland and was named Player of the Match.

Meena returned to Bristol City upon the conclusion of her loan. She was named the team's fan-voted Player of the Month for October 2026.

== International career ==
Both of Meena's parents were born in Tanzania, making Meena eligible to represent either England or Tanzania internationally. She has referred to Tanzania as her "favorite country in the world."

While playing for Wake Forest, Meena was invited to England under-18 national team training camps and was a member of the U18 national team pool. In March 2025, Meena earned her first England under-23 national team call-up, ahead of the WU23 European League finals. She debuted for the squad on 3 April 2026, starting in a 2–1 loss to Spain.

Meena received her first call-up to the Tanzania senior national team in 2024, ahead of friendlies against Tunisia and Botswana on 11 and 13 July, respectively. The following year, she was called up for 2026 Women's Africa Cup of Nations qualification matches against Equatorial Guinea.

== Personal life ==
Meena is the daughter of Albert Meena and Hellen Lawuo. She has collected thousands of items from players, fans, and coaches, primarily football boots and kits, and donated them to schoolchildren in Tanzania; she hopes to later expand her efforts to also include school equipment.
