= Kylie Maxwell =

American soccer player (born 2007)

- Maxwell with Wake Forest in 2026

Personal information
- Date of birth: June 1, 2007 (age 19)
- Height: 5 ft 10 in (1.78 m)
- Position: Right winger

Team information
- Current team: Wake Forest Demon Deacons
- Number: 31

Youth career
- Ukrainian Nationals

College career
Years	Team	Apps	(Gls)
2025–	Wake Forest Demon Deacons	37	(11)

International career^{‡}
2024	United States U-17	1	(0)
2026–	United States U-19	4	(2)
- ‡ National team caps and goals as of July 1, 2026

Kylie Maxwell (born June 1, 2007) is an American college soccer player who plays as a right winger for the Wake Forest Demon Deacons. She was named ACC Freshman of the Year in 2025.

== Early life ==
Maxwell grew up in Langhorne, Pennsylvania. She began playing soccer being coached by her mother. She played high school soccer at Neshaminy High School, being named Pennsylvania Gatorade Player of the Year after scoring a school record 38 goals her senior year. She played GA and ECNL club soccer for Philadelphia Ukrainian Nationals SC. She committed to play college soccer for the Wake Forest Demon Deacons.

== College career ==
Maxwell had a strong freshman season with the Wake Forest Demon Deacons in 2025, leading the team with 6 goals and adding 5 assists in 19 games. She was the top-ranked player in TopDrawerSoccer's midseason freshman poll, ending the year in fifth place. She was named third-team All-ACC and the ACC Freshman of the Year, becoming the first Demon Deacon to win the award since Katie Stengel in 2010.

== International career ==
Maxwell scored twice in four games for the United States under-19 team in 2026. She contended to make the under-20 roster for the 2026 FIFA U-20 Women's World Cup but was ultimately left out of the squad.

== Personal life ==
Maxwell is the daughter of Leslie and Joe Maxwell. Her older brother, Joe Joe, plays college soccer for West Chester, and her twin sister, Taylor, plays with her at Wake Forest.

== Honors and awards ==
Individual

- Second-team All-ACC: 2026
- Third-team All-ACC: 2025
- ACC Freshman of the Year: 2025
