= 2024 NCAA Division I women's soccer championship game =

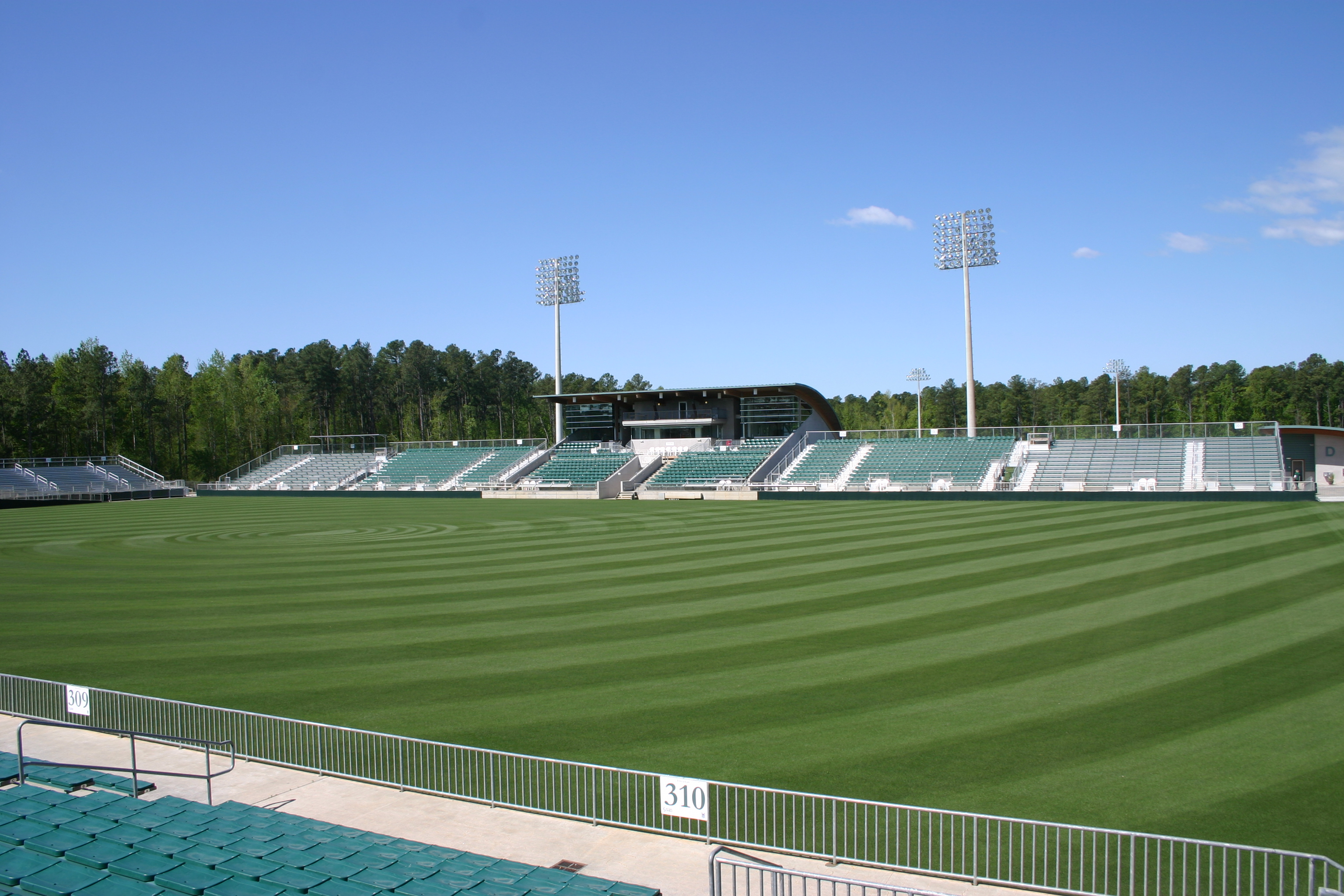
- WakeMed Soccer Park hosted the match
- Event: 2024 NCAA Division I women's soccer tournament
North Carolina	Wake Forest
ACC	ACC
1	0
- Date: December 9, 2024
- Venue: WakeMed Soccer Park, Cary, NC
- Referee: Danielle Chesky
- Attendance: 9,475

The 2024 NCAA Division I women's soccer championship game (also known as the 2024 NCAA Division I Women's College Cup) was played on December 9, 2024, at WakeMed Soccer Park in Cary, North Carolina, and determined the winner of the 2024 NCAA Division I women's soccer tournament, the national collegiate women's soccer championship in the United States. This was the 43rd edition of this tournament organized by the NCAA.

The match featured North Carolina and Wake Forest, both from the ACC. The match was Wake Forest's first appearance in the final, and it was North Carolina's twenty-eighth appearance. North Carolina's head coach Damon Nahas was coaching in his first championship game, as was Wake Forest head coach Tony da Luz. Nahas was in his first season as head coach while da Luz was in his twenty-eighth. The two rivals met during the regular season on September 12, a game which North Carolina won at home 1–0. Both teams entered as the second seed in their respective brackets. Wake Forest was ranked third in the United Soccer Coaches poll, while North Carolina was ranked eighth.

North Carolina prevailed in the final 1–0 by virtue of a sixty-second minute free-kick goal from Olivia Thomas. The win was North Carolina's twenty-second NCAA tournament title, and their twenty-third title overall, as they won one AIAW title. North Carolina won the title despite having twenty-one players leave the team from the prior season, and the retirement of their forty-seven year head coach Anson Dorrance just four days prior to the start of the season. After the game, Clare Gagne was named the tournament Most Outstanding Defensive Player and Olivia Thomas was named tournament Most Outstanding Offensive Player.

== Road to the final ==
The NCAA Division I women's soccer tournament, sometimes known as the College Cup, is an American intercollegiate soccer tournament conducted by the National Collegiate Athletic Association (NCAA), and determines the Division I women's national champion. The tournament has been formally held since 1982, when it was a twelve-team tournament.

(2) North Carolina (ACC)		Round	(2) Wake Forest (ACC)	
Opponent	Result	NCAA Tournament	Opponent	Result
USC Upstate	8–0 (H)	First round	Morehead State	4–0 (H)
Santa Clara	1–0 (H)	Second round	Colorado	3–1 (H)
(6) Minnesota	3–0 (H)	Round of 16	(3) Ohio State	1–0 (H)
(4) Penn State	2–1 (H)	Quarterfinal	(1) USC	2–2 (4–3 p) (A)
(1) Duke	3–0 (N)	College Cup	(3) Stanford	1–0 (N)

== Match details ==
2024 College Cup
December 9, 2024
7:00 p.m. EST
Final

North Carolina	1–0	Wake Forest
62' Olivia Thomas; (yellow card) 73' Team	Report

WakeMed Soccer Park, Cary, North Carolina
Attendance: 9,475
Referee: Danielle Chesky

North Carolina
Wake Forest

GK	0	(United States) Clare Gagne
DF	3	(United States) Trinity Armstrong
DF	4	(United States) Aven Alvarez
DF	34	(United States) Tessa Dellarose	(substituted off) 33' (substituted on) 45'
MF	6	(United States) Emerson Elgin
MF	7	(United States) Linda Ullmark	(substituted off) 45' (substituted on) 70'
MF	8	(United States) Bella Gaetino	(yellow card) 19'
MF	19	(United States) Aria Nagai
FW	5	(United States) Maddie Dahlien	(yellow card) 74'
FW	13	(United States) Kate Faasse
FW	33	(United States) Olivia Thomas	(substituted off) 40' (substituted on) 45' (substituted off) 70' (substituted on) 77'
Substitutions:
DF	2	(United States) Evelyn Shores	(substituted on) 33' (substituted off) 77'
MF	18	(United States) Bella Sember	(substituted on) 40' (substituted off) 45'
Head Coach:
(United States) Damon Nahas

GK	1	(United States) Valentina Amaral
DF	7	(United States) Kristin Johnson
DF	24	(Canada) Zara Chavoshi
DF	33	(United States) Abbie Colton	(substituted off) 29' (substituted on) 62' (substituted off) 79'
DF	34	(United States) Laurel Ansbrow
MF	3	(United States) Emily Colton
MF	9	(United States) Caiya Hanks
MF	10	(England) Malaika Meena	(substituted off) 70' (substituted on) 79'
MF	13	(United States) Emily Morris	(substituted off) 62' (substituted on) 70' (yellow card) 73'
FW	19	(United States) Sierra Sythe
FW	35	(Republic of Ireland) Emily Murphy	(substituted off) 40' (yellow card) 61'
Substitutions:
MF	6	(United States) Dempsey Brown	(substituted on) 29' (substituted off) 62' (yellow card) 62'
FW	16	(United States) Alex Wood	(substituted on) 83'
FW	20	(United States) Hannah Johnson	(substituted on) 40'
MF	30	(United States) Anna Swanson	(substituted on) 62' (substituted off) 83'
Head Coach:
(United States) Tony da Luz

College Cup MVP
Offensive: Olivia Thomas
Defensive: Clare Gagne

Assistant referees:
Katarzyna Wasiak
Laura Chambers Waliski (United States)
Fourth official:
John Rush (United States)

Match rules:

- 90 minutes.
- 20 minutes of extra time if necessary.
- Penalty shoot-out if scores still level.
- Unlimited substitutes, may not return if subbed out in the first half; may return unlimited times in the second half.

=== Statistics ===
Overall
	North Carolina	Wake Forest
Goals scored	1	0
Total shots	6	7
Shots on target	2	3
Saves	3	1
Corner kicks	2	4
Offsides	4	1
Yellow cards	3	3
Red cards	0	0
