= Zara Chavoshi =

Canadian soccer player (born 2002)

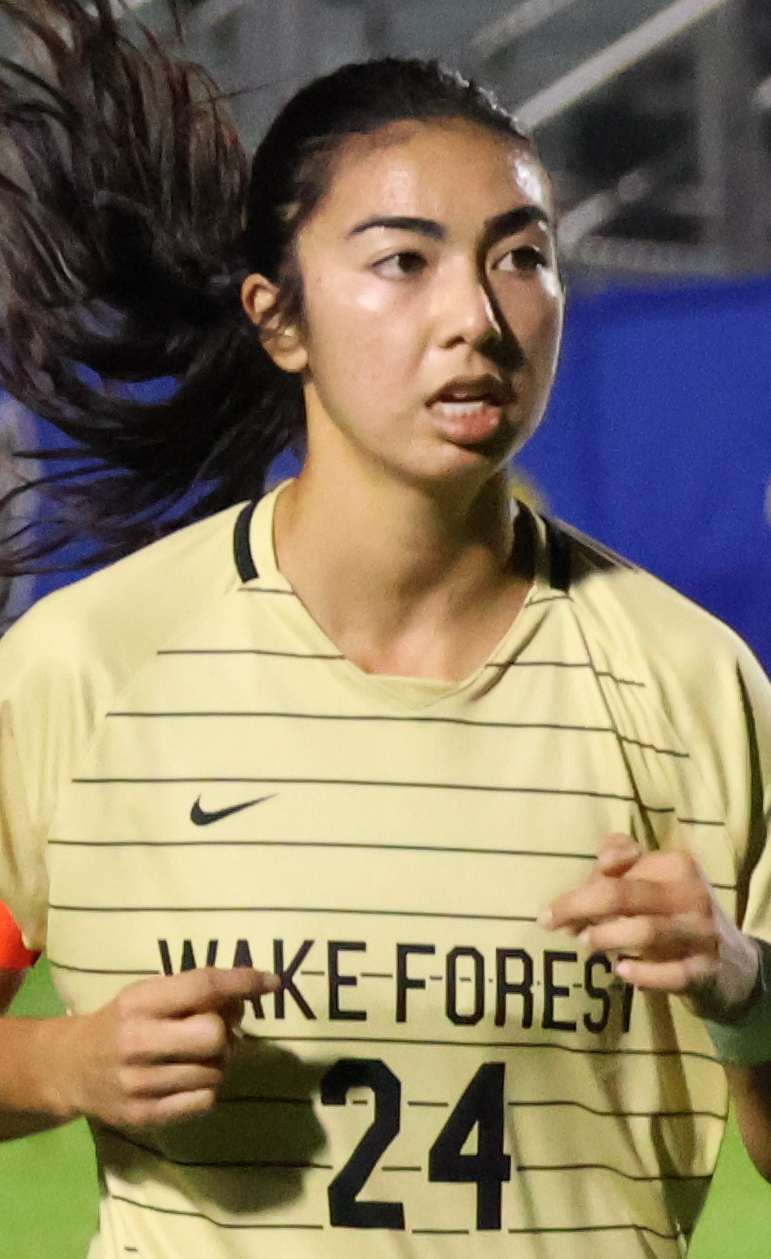
- Chavoshi with Wake Forest in 2024

Personal information
- Full name: Zara Sona Chavoshi
- Date of birth: December 6, 2002 (age 23)
- Place of birth: Newark, Delaware, United States
- Height: 5 ft 8 in (1.73 m)
- Position: Defender

Team information
- Current team: Orlando Pride
- Number: 16

Youth career
- McLean Soccer

College career
Years	Team	Apps	(Gls)
2021–2024	Wake Forest Demon Deacons	74	(2)

Senior career*
Years	Team	Apps	(Gls)
2022	McLean Soccer	4	(0)
2023	Racing Louisville FC B	2	(0)
2025–	Orlando Pride	22	(0)

International career^{‡}
2022	Canada U20	1	(0)
2025	Canada	2	(1)
- * Club domestic league appearances and goals as of 03:23, November 8, 2026 (UTC) ‡ National team caps and goals as of June 27, 2025

Zara Sona Chavoshi (born December 6, 2002) is a professional soccer player who plays as a defender for the Orlando Pride of the National Women's Soccer League (NWSL). Born in the United States to Canadian parents, she represents Canada internationally.

Chavoshi played college soccer for the Wake Forest Demon Deacons and helped lead the team to their first national title game appearance.

== Early life ==
Born in Newark, Delaware, Chavoshi grew up in Potomac, Maryland, and began playing soccer at age five. She attended Thomas S. Wootton High School in Rockville, Maryland, and played club soccer for McLean Youth Soccer, winning two ECNL championships.

== College career ==
Chavoshi played 18 games (all starts) in her freshman season with the Wake Forest Demon Deacons in 2021. She played every minute in the postseason as Wake Forest made the semifinals of the ACC tournament, falling to Florida State, and the second round of the NCAA tournament, falling to Michigan. In her sophomore season, she played 16 games (14 starts), missing the very start of the season while at the 2022 FIFA U-20 Women's World Cup. Wake Forest lost to South Carolina in the first round of the NCAA tournament. In her junior season, she featured at right back and made 15 appearances (14 starts), helping hold opponents to a program-record-low 15 goals. Wake Forest lost to Clemson in the first round of the ACC tournament and missed the NCAA tournament.

Chavoshi started all 24 games and played the most minutes on the team in her final season in 2024, helping Wake Forest achieve one of its best-ever seasons as one of many seniors on the team. Playing at center back alongside Laurel Ansbrow, she helped shut out No. 2 Virginia 3–0 and No. 1 Stanford 1–0, making Wake Forest the first team to beat the top two ranked teams consecutively. She also helped defeat defending national champions Florida State 4–1, ending their 32–game unbeaten streak. They lost to Florida State on penalties after a 1–1 draw in the semifinals of the ACC tournament. In the NCAA tournament, she helped lead Wake Forest to their first national title game in program history, beating Stanford 1–0 in the semifinals before losing 1–0 to North Carolina in the final. After the season, she was named second-team All-ACC, third-team All-American by TopDrawerSoccer, and fourth-team All-American by United Soccer Coaches.

== Club career ==
In 2022, Chavoshi played with McLean Soccer in the USL W League. In 2023, she played with Racing Louisville FC B in the USL W League.

The Orlando Pride announced on January 13, 2025, that they had signed Chavoshi to her first professional contract, a one-year deal. She was the team's first college signing after the abolition of the college draft. She made her professional debut on March 23, coming on as a late substitute for Angelina in a 2–0 win against NJ/NY Gotham FC. On May 3, in her first professional start, she played 90 minutes and cleared a Reilyn Turner shot off the goal line as the Pride lost 1–0 away to the Portland Thorns.

== International career ==
Chavoshi received her first call-up to the Canada youth national team in July 2022. She was selected to the roster for the 2022 FIFA U-20 Women's World Cup and started one game in the competition, a 3–1 loss to Nigeria, as Canada finished bottom of their group. Chavoshi was called into training camp with the United States under-23 team, practicing alongside the senior national team, in March 2025.

Two months later, in May 2025, Chavoshi received her first senior call-up with the Canadian national team before two friendlies against Haiti. She made her senior international debut on June 3, starting in a 3–1 victory over Haiti. On June 27, 2025, she scored her first international goal in a 4–1 victory over Costa Rica.

== Personal life ==
Chavoshi is one of three children born to Soheil and Cindy Tran-Chavoshi. Her father is originally from Kermanshah, Iran; her mother from Cần Thơ, Vietnam. Both of her parents immigrated to Canada, where they met and became citizens, before moving to the United States, where Chavoshi was born.

== Career statistics ==
=== International goals ===
Scores and results list Canada's goal tally first, score column indicates score after each Chavoshi goal.

List of international goals scored by Zara Chavoshi
No.	Date	Venue	Opponent	Score	Result	Competition
1	June 27, 2025	BMO Field, Toronto, Canada	Costa Rica	3–1	4–1	Friendly

== Honors and awards ==
Individual

- Fourth-team All-American: 2024
- Second-team All-ACC: 2024
