= Valentina Amaral =

American soccer player (born 2005)

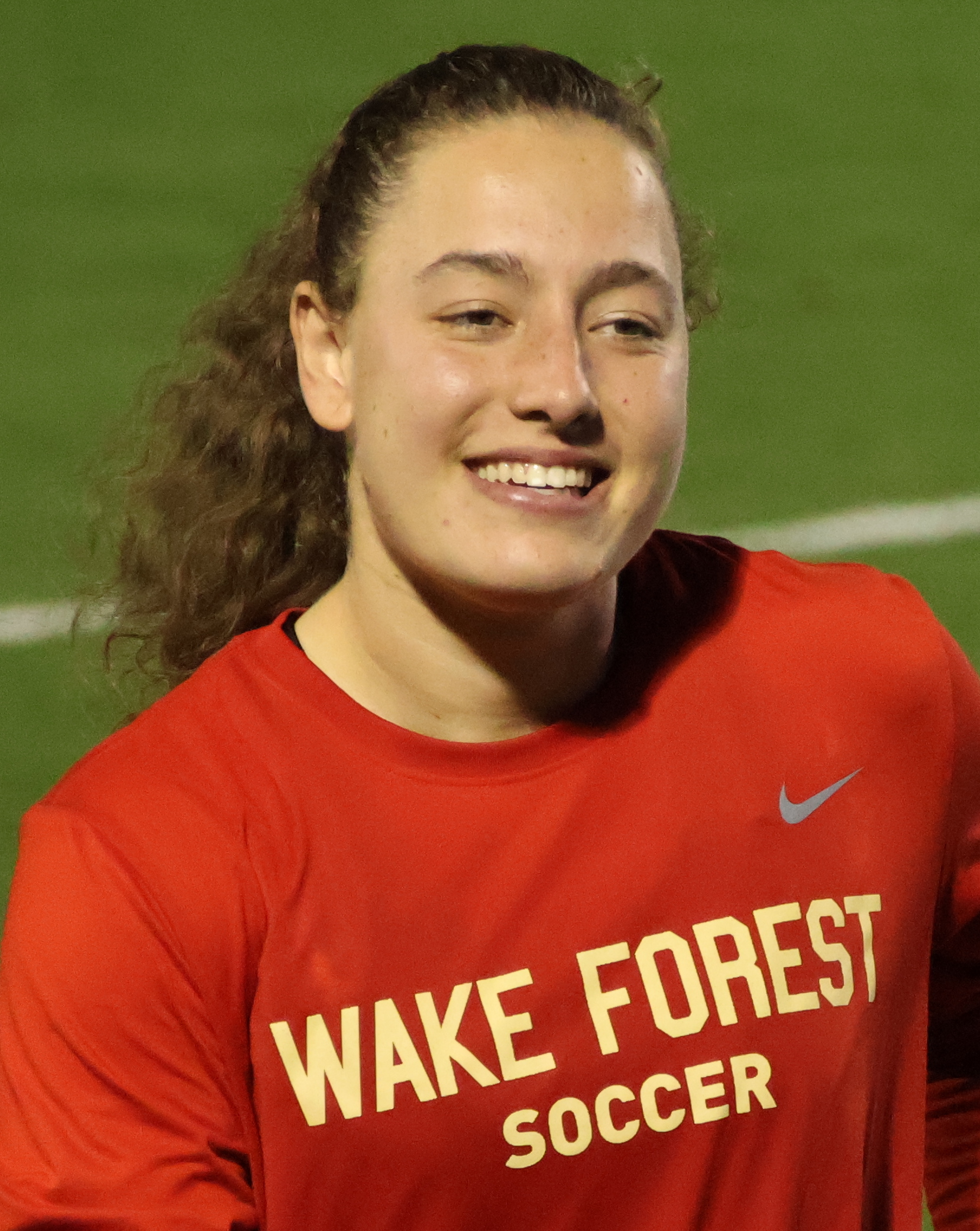
- Amaral with Wake Forest in 2026

Personal information
- Full name: Valentina Cerri do Amaral
- Date of birth: April 5, 2005 (age 21)
- Place of birth: Brazil
- Height: 5 ft 7 in (1.70 m)
- Position: Goalkeeper

Team information
- Current team: Wake Forest Demon Deacons
- Number: 1

Youth career
- Florida Kraze Krush

College career
Years	Team	Apps	(Gls)
2023–	Wake Forest Demon Deacons	53	(0)

International career^{‡}
2022	United States U-17	4	(0)
2023	United States U-20	1	(0)
- ‡ National team caps and goals as of May 28, 2023

Valentina Cerri do Amaral (born April 5, 2005) is a college soccer player who plays as a goalkeeper for the Wake Forest Demon Deacons. Born in Brazil, she is a youth international for the United States. She was named ACC Goalkeeper of the Year in 2026.

== Early life ==
The daughter of Brazilian soccer player Leandro Amaral, she was born in Brazil before moving to the United States with her family when she was six. She began playing soccer with her two triplet brothers and specialized in goal at an early age. She played youth soccer for Florida Kraze Krush, where her father was a coach, and earned ECNL all-conference honors. She was a backup goalkeeper for Oviedo High School in Oviedo, Florida, and instead played at forward, leading the team with 19 goals in 12 games as a sophomore. She was ranked by TopDrawerSoccer as the No. 19 prospect of the 2023 class.

== College career ==
After missing most of her true freshman year, Amaral became the starter for the Wake Forest Demon Deacons in her redshirt freshman season in 2024. In the regular season, back-to-back shutouts against No. 2 Virginia and No. 1 Stanford made Wake Forest the first team to beat the top two ranked teams consecutively; another win against Florida State ended a 32–game unbeaten streak for the reigning champions. Amaral made a season-high six saves in the NCAA tournament quarterfinals against USC. After a 2–2 draw in regulation, she saved a penalty kick and missed one herself in a 4–3 shootout victory. In the semifinals against Stanford, she made four saves including one off the goalpost as Wake won 1–0 to advance to the first national title game in program history. North Carolina won by the same score in the final. Amaral had 6 solo clean sheets (9 combined) in 19 games, while setting a program record of 0.69 goals against average, and was named third-team All-Atlantic Coast Conference.

Amaral started all 20 games and kept 6 shutouts as a redshirt sophomore in 2025, earning third-team All-ACC and third-team All-American recognition. She was named ACC Goalkeeper of the Year following her junior year in 2026.

== International career ==
Eligible to represent Brazil or the United States internationally, Amaral first trained with the United States under-14 team at age 12 and went on to attend training camps at the under-15 and under-17 levels. Shortly after becoming a United States citizen in 2022, at age 17, she was called up for friendlies for the first time, playing in games against Spain and Germany. She made the roster for the 2022 FIFA U-17 Women's World Cup initially as the backup to Victoria Safradin. She played and started in two games at the FIFA U-17 Women's World Cup, a 4–0 group win against Morocco and a 1–1 quarterfinal draw with Nigeria. The latter ended in a 4–3 shootout loss in which Amaral was ruled to have jumped early on the only attempt she appeared to stop. The following year, she made her under-20 debut at the 2023 CONCACAF Women's U-20 Championship, starting in a 4–0 win against Jamaica in the group stage. She was called into a development camp, training concurrently with the senior national team, in January 2026.

== Honors and awards ==
Wake Forest Demon Deacons

- NCAA tournament runner-up: 2024

Individual

- ACC Goalkeeper of the Year: 2026
- Third-team All-American: 2025
- First-team All-ACC: 2026
- Third-team All-ACC: 2024, 2025
