= Emily Murphy (footballer) =

Irish footballer (born 2003)

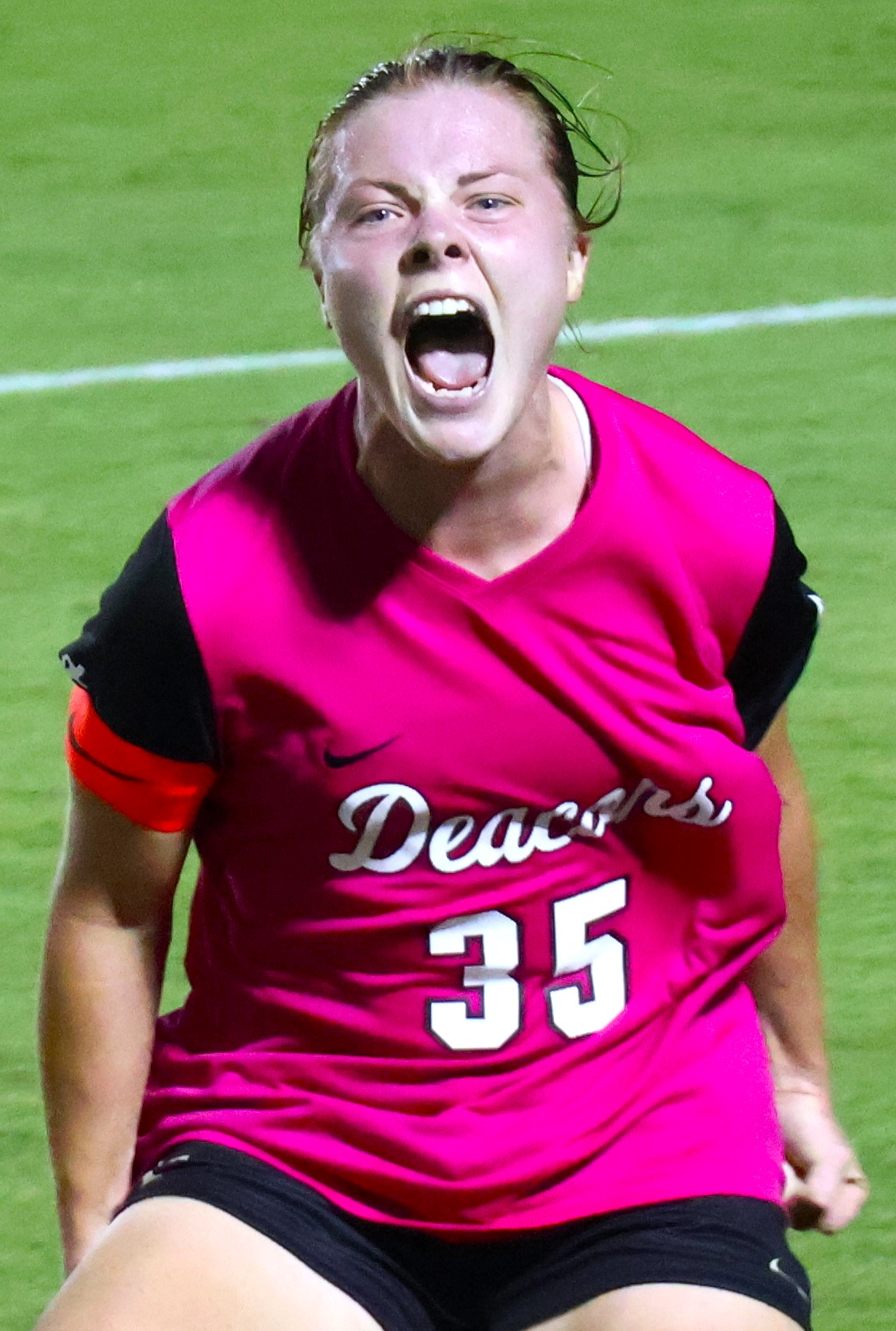
- Murphy with Wake Forest in 2024

Personal information
- Full name: Emily Sheila Murphy
- Date of birth: 2 March 2003 (age 23)
- Place of birth: England
- Position: Forward

Team information
- Current team: Brighton & Hove Albion
- Number: 35

Youth career
- -2019: Chelsea

College career
Years	Team	Apps	(Gls)
2021–2022	North Carolina Tar Heels	39	(10)
2023–2025	Wake Forest Demon Deacons	35	(11)

Senior career*
Years	Team	Apps	(Gls)
2019–2021	Chelsea	2	(1)
2021	→ Birmingham City (loan)	11	(1)
2025–2026	Newcastle United	31	(8)
2026–	Brighton & Hove Albion	11	(0)

International career^{‡}
2019	England U17	3	(1)
2022	England U19	4	(0)
2024–	Republic of Ireland	20	(3)
- * Club domestic league appearances and goals as of 22 November 2026 ‡ National team caps and goals as of 13 October 2026

Emily Sheila Murphy (born 2 March 2003) is an Irish professional footballer who plays as a forward for Women's Super League side Brighton & Hove Albion. Born in England, she represents the Republic of Ireland at international level. Murphy played college soccer for the North Carolina Tar Heels and the Wake Forest Demon Deacons, making national title game appearances with both teams.

== College career ==
=== North Carolina Tar Heels ===
Murphy moved to the United States in 2021 to attend college at the University of North Carolina and play for the North Carolina Tar Heels under Anson Dorrance. She started for the team during her freshman year, scoring 5 goals and leading the team with 6 assists in 15 games. She was named to the Atlantic Coast Conference (ACC) all-freshman team. North Carolina earned a two seed in the NCAA tournament but was upset in the first round.

In her sophomore season in 2022, she featured primarily as a substitute but nearly matched her previous year's tally with 5 goals and 4 assists in 24 appearances. She appeared in four games during the NCAA tournament, where the Tar Heels lost to UCLA in the final.

=== Wake Forest Demon Deacons ===
Murphy transferred to the Wake Forest Demon Deacons in 2023. In her junior season, she scored 6 goals and 2 assists in 17 games. Wake Forest went undefeated at home but ended its season in the ACC tournament quarterfinals.

In her senior season in 2024, Murphy led the Demon Deacons to one of the greatest seasons in program history. She scored and assisted Caiya Hanks during a 4–1 win against Florida State, ending their 32–game unbeaten streak. Wake Forest placed second in the ACC regular season and lost on penalties to Florida State in the ACC tournament semifinals. In the NCAA tournament, Murphy scored in each of the first three rounds. She was named in the all-tournament team after helping the team advance to first national final in program history, where the Demon Deacons lost 1–0 to the Tar Heels. Murphy finished the season with 7 goals and 8 assists in 23 games (both second to Hanks on the team) and was named second-team All-ACC.

== Club career ==
=== Chelsea ===
On 20 November 2019, Murphy made her senior debut when being subbed on against Tottenham Hotspur in the group stage of the Continental League Cup in a game where Chelsea won 5–1.

=== Newcastle United ===
After college, Murphy signed with FA Women’s Championship side Newcastle United in January 2025. She managed to get 2 goals and 5 assists in just 9 games in the 2024–25 season.

=== Brighton ===
On 24 July 2026, Brighton announced that Murphy had signed for the Gulls after just a year and a half at Newcastle.

== International career ==
In October 2019, Murphy was called to up to the England U17 team to play in the 2020 U17 UEFA Championship qualification games and played against Croatia, Bosnia & Herzegovina and Belgium. Murphy scored one of the goals in the 4–1 win against Belgium.

Murphy was one of four Irish-eligible players to be invited to a senior Republic of Ireland national team training camp in April 2021. In February 2024 she was called up to Ireland's squad for friendlies against Wales and Italy under new manager Eileen Gleeson.

== Career statistics ==
=== Club ===
As of match played 22 November 2026

Appearances and goals by club, season and competition
Club	Season	League			National cup (Note: includes Women's FA Cup)		League cup (Note: includes Women's League Cup)		Total	
Club	Season	Division	Apps	Goals	Apps	Goals	Apps	Goals	Apps	Goals
Chelsea	2019–20	Women's Super League	2	1	0	0	3	1	5	2
Birmingham City (loan)	2020–21	Women's Super League	11	1	2	2	0	0	13	3
Newcastle United	2024–25	Women's Championship	9	2	1	0	0	0	10	2
Newcastle United	2025-26	Women's Super League 2	22	6	3	1	3	0	28	7
Newcastle United	Total		31	8	4	1	3	0	38	9
Brighton & Hove Albion	2026–27	Women's Super League	11	0	0	0	5	4	16	4
Career total			55	10	6	3	11	5	72	18

=== International ===
As of match played 13 October 2026

Appearances and goals by national team and year
National team	Year	Apps	Goals
Republic of Ireland	2024	5	0
Republic of Ireland	2025	8	1
Republic of Ireland	2026	7	2
Total		20	3

No.	Date	Venue	Opponent	Score	Result	Competition
1	30 May 2025	Esenier Staduim, Istanbul, Turkey	Turkey	2–1	2–1	2025 UEFA Women's Nations League
2	14 April 2026	Gdańsk Stadium, Gdańsk, Poland	Poland	1–0	3–2	2027 FIFA Women's World Cup qualification
3	9 October 2026	Astana Arena, Astana, Kazakhstan	Kazakhstan	4–0	8–0	2027 FIFA Women's World Cup qualification play-offs
