= Kaley Fountain =

American professional soccer player

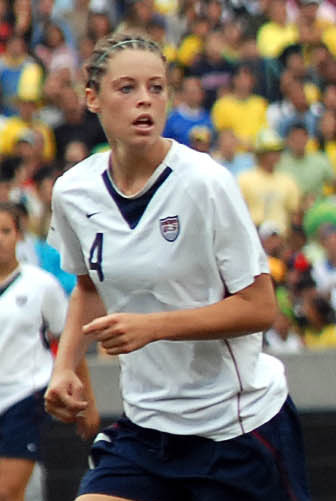
- Fountain at the 2007 Pan American Games

Personal information
- Full name: Kaley Nikole Fountain
- Date of birth: July 1, 1988 (age 38)
- Place of birth: Austin, Texas, United States
- Height: 5 ft 7 in (1.70 m)
- Positions: Forward; defender

Youth career
- 1998–2005: Lonestar Soccer Club
- 2002–2004: Westwood High School

College career
Years	Team	Apps	(Gls)
2006–2009	Wake Forest Demon Deacons		

Senior career*
Years	Team	Apps	(Gls)
2010	FC Gold Pride	5	(0)
2010	Atlanta Beat	5	(0)
2011–2013	Western New York Flash	5	(0)

International career
2005	United States U-17		
2007–2008	United States U-20		
2009	United States U-21		
Medal record
Representing United States
Women's Football
Pan American Games
Silver medal – second place	2007 Rio de Janeiro	Team competition
- * Club domestic league appearances and goals

Kaley Nikole Fountain (born July 1, 1988) is an American professional soccer player. She previously played for FC Gold Pride, Atlanta Beat, and Western New York Flash of Women's Professional Soccer and was a member of the United States U-20 women's national soccer team squad that won the 2008 FIFA U-20 Women's World Cup.

== Early life ==
=== Wake Forest University ===
Fountain attended Wake Forest University. At Wake Forest, she played in 86 games, starting in 81 of them. In 2009, she claimed the number four spot on single-season goals for Wake Forest after scoring eleven goals. She also had ten assists that season. Fountain would later return to Wake Forest as an assistant coach.

== Playing career ==
=== Youth Club ===
Warrior Soccer Club and Lonstar Soccer club in Austin, Texas.

==== FC Gold Pride ====
Fountain was drafted by FC Gold Pride in the second round of the 2010 WPS Draft. She played five games for the Pride before signing with the Atlanta Beat for the remainder of the 2010 Women's Professional Soccer season.

==== Atlanta Beat ====
Fountain signed as a free agent with the Atlanta Beat midway through the 2010 season. She made five appearances for the team, starting two of those matches.

==== Western New York Flash ====
In November 2010, Fountain signed with the Western New York Flash for the 2011 Women's Professional Soccer season. With the Western New York Flash, she helped clinch the 2011 WPS Championship.

==== Seattle Reign FC ====
Fountain was selected by Seattle Reign FC in the 2013 NWSL Supplemental Draft, but decided not to play in the new National Women's Soccer League.

=== International ===
Fountain has represented the United States at the U-20 and U-23 levels. She was a member of the U-20 U.S. Women's National Team that won the 2008 FIFA U-20 Women's World Cup in Chile and played with the U-20 U.S. women's national team during the Pan Am Games in the Summer of 2007.
