= Tony da Luz =

American soccer coach (born 1961)

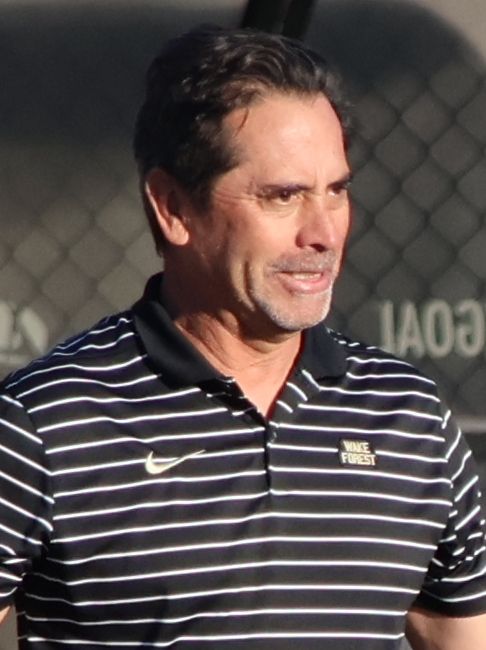
- Da Luz in 2026

Personal information
- Date of birth: August 30, 1961 (age 65)
- Place of birth: San Diego, California, U.S.
- Positions: Midfielder; defender

Team information
- Current team: Wake Forest Demon Deacons (head coach)

College career
Years	Team	Apps	(Gls)
1981–1982	San Diego Toreros		

Managerial career
- 1985–1991: San Diego Toreros (men's, assistant)
- 1992–1996: San Diego Toreros
- 1997–: Wake Forest Demon Deacons

Tony da Luz (born August 30, 1961) is an American college soccer coach who is the head coach of the Wake Forest Demon Deacons women's soccer team, a position he has held since 1997.

== Career ==
Da Luz played college soccer for the San Diego Toreros and assistant-coached the men's team after graduating. He became the inaugural head coach of the San Diego Toreros women's soccer team in 1992. In his last season in San Diego in 1996, he led the team to the second round of the NCAA tournament and was named the West Coast Conference (WCC) Coach of the Year.

Da Luz was hired as the head coach of the Wake Forest Demon Deacons women's soccer team in 1997. He was named Atlantic Coast Conference (ACC) Coach of the Year in his second season in 1998. In 2011, he led Wake Forest to their first appearance in the NCAA tournament semifinals. In 2024, he led the Demon Deacons to their national championship appearance, losing to North Carolina.

== Personal life ==
Da Luz and his wife, Amy, have three children. Their son Austin played college soccer at Wake Forest and professionally for North Carolina FC.
