= Caiya Hanks =

American soccer player (born 2004)

- Hanks with the Portland Thorns in 2026

Personal information
- Date of birth: September 26, 2004 (age 22)
- Place of birth: Oakland, California, U.S.
- Height: 5 ft 4 in (1.63 m)
- Position: Forward

Team information
- Current team: Portland Thorns
- Number: 7

Youth career
- Kona Crush

College career
Years	Team	Apps	(Gls)
2022–2024	Wake Forest Demon Deacons	63	(18)

Senior career*
Years	Team	Apps	(Gls)
2022	Tampa Bay United (USL W)	6	(4)
2023	Racing Louisville (USL W)	3	(5)
2024	Tampa Bay United (USL W)	4	(9)
2025–	Portland Thorns	22	(4)

International career^{‡}
2025–	United States U23	2	(0)
- * Club domestic league appearances and goals as of November 11, 2026 ‡ National team caps and goals as of June 2, 2025

Caiya Hanks (born September 26, 2004) is an American professional soccer player who plays as a forward for Portland Thorns FC of the National Women's Soccer League (NWSL). She played college soccer for the Wake Forest Demon Deacons, earning first-team All-American honors after leading Wake Forest to the 2024 national title game.

== Early life ==
Born in Oakland, California, Hanks moved to Hawaii at age five. She grew up in Kailua-Kona. She began playing soccer in the footsteps of her older sister, Jadyn, who later played college soccer at Idaho. Their father, Steve, who played college football at Kansas State, sometimes had them wake up early to practice running track.

Hanks attended Konawaena High School, where she was an all-state member of the soccer team, winning multiple BIIF titles. She also starred on the Konawaena track team, winning the state 200 meters race in her senior year. She played club soccer for Kona Crush. Hawaii's distance limited her exposure to college scouts, but she eventually committed to Wake Forest in her senior year. While in college, Hanks played during the summer for Tampa Bay United and Racing Louisville in the USL W League.

== College career ==
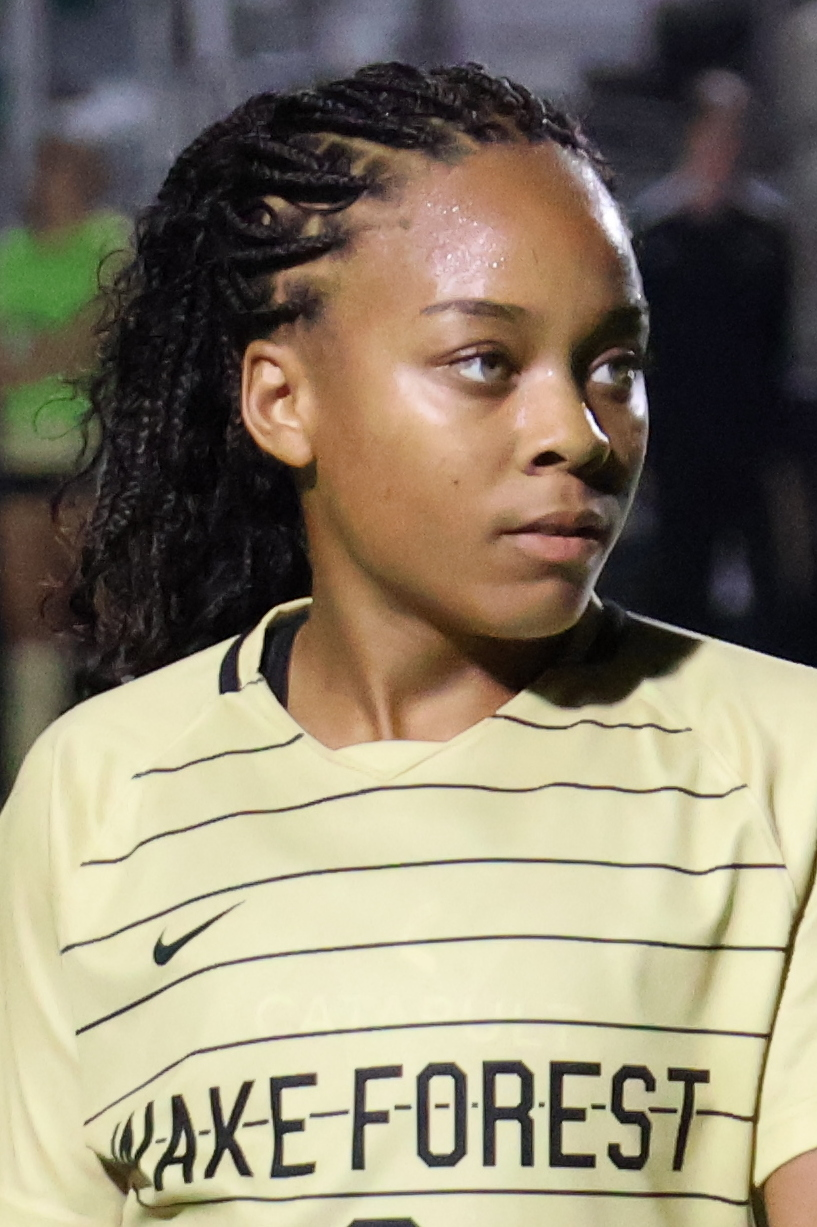
Hanks with Wake Forest in 2024

Hanks started all 22 games and scored 1 goal with 3 assists in her freshman season with the Wake Forest Demon Deacons in 2022. She led the team with 6 goals and added 4 assists in 17 games in her sophomore season in 2023, earning second-team All-ACC honors.

Hanks led the Demon Deacons to one of their best seasons ever as a junior the 2024 campaign. One week in September, she scored twice in a 3–0 win against No. 2–ranked Virginia and days later assisted Emily Colton in a 1–0 win against No. 1 Stanford, which made Wake Forest the first team to defeat the top two ranked teams consecutively. She also scored in a 4–1 win against defending national champions Florida State, which ended the latter's 32–game unbeaten streak. Wake Forest went into the NCAA tournament as a two seed. Hanks recorded three goals and five assists in six games during the tournament, including one of each in a 2–2 draw against USC in the quarterfinals (advancing on penalties). She provided the winning assist in a 1–0 semifinal win against Stanford before losing to North Carolina 1–0 in Wake Forest's first national title game. She finished the season with 11 goals and 12 assists in 24 games and was named first-team All-ACC, first-team All-American, and one of three finalists for the Hermann Trophy.

== Club career ==
Portland Thorns FC announced on March 12, 2025, that the club had signed Hanks to a four-year contract with a club option for an additional year. Three days later, Hanks made her professional debut as a second-half substitute for Hina Sugita in the season opener against the Kansas City Current. On April 22, she scored her first professional goal and assisted Mimi Alidou as the Thorns won 4–1 at home against Gotham FC. She quickly became a fan favorite at Providence Park. However, on June 15, she sustained an anterior cruciate ligament injury during the first half against the Washington Spirit, ruling her out for the remainder of the season. She finished her rookie season with 2 goals and 2 assists in 13 appearances in all competitions.

On August 15, 2026, Hanks returned from injury after 14 months, coming off the bench late and scoring the 2–1 stoppage-time winner against the Orlando Pride.

== International career ==
Hanks was called into training camp with the United States under-23 team, practicing alongside the senior national team, in March 2025. In June, she played for the under-23s in a set of friendlies against Germany, drawing a penalty which Korbin Albert scored.

== Honors and awards ==
Individual

- First-team All-American: 2024
- First-team All-ACC: 2023
- Second-team All-ACC: 2023
