= Wake Forest Demon Deacons women's soccer =

American college soccer team

- 2026 Wake Forest Demon Deacons women's soccer team
- Founded: 1994; 32 years ago
- University: Wake Forest University
- Head coach: Tony da Luz (30th season)
- Conference: ACC
- Location: Winston-Salem, North Carolina, US
- Stadium: Spry Stadium (capacity: 3,000)
- Nickname: Deacs
- Colors: Old gold and black
Home	Away

NCAA tournament College Cup
- 2011, 2024

NCAA tournament Quarterfinals
- 2009, 2011, 2024

NCAA tournament Round of 16
- 1996, 1999, 2009, 2011, 2013, 2018, 2024

NCAA tournament Round of 32
- 1996, 1997, 1999, 2000, 2002, 2006, 2007, 2008, 2009, 2010, 2011, 2012, 2013, 2017, 2018, 2021, 2024, 2025

NCAA tournament appearances
- 1996, 1997, 1998, 1999, 2000, 2001, 2002, 2003, 2004, 2005, 2006, 2007, 2008, 2009, 2010, 2011, 2012, 2013, 2017, 2018, 2021, 2022, 2024, 2025

Conference tournament championships
- 2010

The Wake Forest University Demon Deacons women's soccer team that plays in the, NCAA Division I college soccer team composed of students attending Wake Forest University in Winston-Salem, North Carolina. They achieved their best NCAA Tournament result in both 2011 and 2024, when they reached the College Cup. Like all sports teams from Wake Forest, women's soccer competes in the Atlantic Coast Conference. The Deacons play their home matches at Spry Stadium which is on the campus of Wake Forest.

== History ==
=== 1990s ===
Wake Forest fielded its first team in 1994, under the coaching of Chris Turner. The Deacons went 8–9–0 in their first season. However, all of those 8 wins came outside the Atlantic Coast Conference. Despite the team's 0–6 conference record, they still qualified for the ACC Women's Soccer Tournament, where they would lose in the first round. In 1995, the team won their first ACC game, and finished with a .500 record of 9–9–3. Continuing to build, they won 2 conference games and their first ACC tournament game in 1996. Their 14–8 overall record would be the program's first winning record. The team qualified for its first NCAA Tournament. This would start a run of 18 straight NCAA qualifications for the Demon Deacons. The team couldn't quite reach the same heights in 1997, finishing 11–8–2 and losing in the first round of the NCAA Tournament. After the season Chris Turner would leave as head coach and would be replaced by Tony da Luz. In his first season, Da Luz would lead the Demon Deacons to their first ever winning conference season. The team also qualified for the NCAA Tournament and finished the season nationally ranked. In 1999, a trip to the third round of the NCAA Tournament earned the team its first top 15 ranking at the end of the season. The Demon Deacons closed the season with a 16–6–1 record. A program record for wins in a season that stood until 2011. The team also finished as runners up in the ACC Tournament.

=== 2000s ===
The decade began with the Demon Deacon's third straight 4–3 ACC record. However, this year it was good enough to finish for a tie for second place in the standings. However, early exits in both the ACC and NCAA tournament saw the team finish with a final ranking of 23rd nationally. This was the third straight year the team finished nationally ranked. In 2001, the team ended a string of five straight winning seasons when they finished the season 9–9–2 overall. They returned to their winning ways in 2002, but regressed in the ACC, finishing 2–4–1 and tied for seventh place in the standings. The regression continued in 2003 when the team only won 1 game in the ACC. However, the team continued to qualify for the NCAA tournament in these years. 2004 was a bit of a rebound year, as the team finished 4–4–1 in the ACC and 10–7 overall, for the second consecutive year. In 2006, the Demon Deacons had their first ACC winning season since 2001, finishing 6–4–0 and tied a program record with 16 overall wins. The team finished 19th in the final national rankings, their first end of season ranking since 2000. The Demon Deacons achieved another final national ranking in 2007 after finishing 6–2–2 in the ACC and reaching the second round of the NCAA Tournament. Their ranking run would continue in 2008 when the team finished 25th overall. 2009 would provide a breakthrough in the NCAA tournament, the Demon Deacons made the Quarterfinals. This would be good enough to reach eighth in the final rankings, a program best at the time.

=== 2010s ===
The decade would start off with a program first in 2010. This year was the first time that Wake Forest won the ACC Tournament. They managed to win the tournament despite finishing fifth in the conference regular season. A second round appearance in the NCAA tournament was good enough to extend the streak of being ranked in the final rankings. 2011 was by all accounts the best season in program history. The team was runner up in the ACC Tournament and finished with a program best 18 overall wins. The Demon Deacons also had their best NCAA Tournament finish in history. They qualified for the College Cup as a #1 seed in the tournament and finished the season ranked fourth, a program best. 2012 couldn't quite see the same success. However, the team did improve on its conference record. 2013 ended seven-year run of being ranked in the final rankings, as a 12–7–2 record and NCAA Sweet 16 appearance was not good enough to crack the final top 25. 2014 was the Demon Deacons first overall losing record since 1994, the year the program began. They would also miss out on the NCAA tournament for the first time since 1996. Things would get worse in 2015 when the team lost 12 games overall and finished tied for last in the ACC. In 2016, the team mustered an overall winning record, but could not improve on a 2–8 conference record. The team returned to the ACC tournament in 2017 for the first time in 4 seasons and ended a three-year skid of not qualifying for the NCAA tournament. 2018 finished positively when the team qualified for the Sweet 16 of the NCAA Tournament and finished the season ranked 25th overall.

=== 2020s ===
The decade started with a season shortened by the COVID-19 pandemic. The Demon Deacons would only play one non-conference game, against Duke. The season was reduced to eight total conference games. The team finished ninth overall, one spot out of qualifying for the ACC Tournament. 2021 saw a return to a more normal schedule and the Demon Deacons posted a 16–6–0 record going 6–4–0 in ACC play. They won a tiebreaker to qualify for the ACC Tournament and received an at-large invite to the NCAA Tournament. Their 16 wins was their highest win total since 2011.

2022 saw a repeat trip to the NCAA Tournament after a 9–6–3 regular season finish. The Demon Deacons lost in the First Round for the first time since 2005. In 2023 the Demon Deacons finished 10–3–5 overall and 4–2–4 in ACC play. They qualified for the ACC tournament for the second time in three years, but broke a two-year streak of qualifying for the NCAA Tournament.

In 2024, Wake Forest reached their first College Cup final, but they lost to North Carolina 1–0.

The Demon Deacons couldn't replicate their highs of 2024 again in 2025. However, they finished 11–5–4 overall and 4–3–3 in ACC play. They returned to the NCAA Tournament, and reached the Second Round.

== Personnel ==
=== Roster ===
As of February 2, 2026

Note: Flags indicate national team as defined under FIFA eligibility rules; some limited exceptions apply. Players may hold more than one non-FIFA nationality.

No.	Pos.	Nation	Player
0	GK	USA	Lizzie Thornton
1	GK	USA	Valentina Amaral
2	MF	USA	Amaya Dawkins
3	DF	USA	Addison Roberts
4	DF	USA	Tahlia Zadeyan
5	DF	USA	MJ Osborne
6	MF	USA	Dempsey Brown
7	MF	ESP	Alejandra Goemz
8	FW	USA	Chloe Burst
9	FW	USA	Elliana Ramirez
10	MF	USA	Brooke Miller
11	FW	USA	Sonoma Bever
12	FW	USA	Aislynn Maguire
13	DF	USA	Rachel Wright
14	MF	USA	Lola Ressler
15	DF	USA	Jordan Turner

No.	Pos.	Nation	Player
16	FW	USA	Alex Wood
17	FW	ENG	Zaiba Ishaque
18	FW	USA	Allie Flanagan
19	FW	USA	Sierra Sythe
20	FW	USA	Hannah Johnson
21	DF	USA	Sammi Wiemann
23	DF	USA	Allie Schmidt
24	MF	USA	Sydney Schuler
25	MF	USA	Sophie Faircloth
26	DF	USA	Taryn Chance
27	MF	USA	Alicia Meincke
28	MF	USA	Carly Wilson
31	FW	USA	Kylie Maxwell
33	GK	USA	Victoria Conick
39	DF	USA	Laine DeNatale

=== Team management ===
Position	Staff
Head coach	Tony da Luz
Associate Head Coach	Brittany Cameron
Assistant coach	Taylor Culp

== Seasons ==
Season	Conference Record						Conference Tourn. Pos.	Overall Record					Honors	Top points		Top scorer	
Season	Conference	Pld.	W	L	D	Pos.	Conference Tourn. Pos.	Pld.	W	L	D	Natl. Rank	Honors	Top points		Top scorer	
1994	ACC	6	0	6	0	7th	QF	17	8	9	0			Cheryl Zimmerman	15	Cheryl Zimmerman	7
1995	ACC	7	1	6	0	7th	QF	21	9	9	3			Julie Scott	21	Julie Scott	8
1996	ACC	7	2	5	0	t-6th	SF	22	14	8	0	20	NCAA 2nd Round	Liz Burnette	27	Liz Burnette	12
1997	ACC	7	1	6	0	7th	QF	21	11	8	2		NCAA 1st Round	Stefanie Mathews	22	Stefanie Mathews	8
1998	ACC	7	4	3	0	4th	SF	21	13	7	1	24	NCAA 1st Round	Anne Shropshire	32	Anne Shropshire	11
1999	ACC	7	4	3	0	t-3rd	F	23	16	6	1	12	NCAA 3rd Round	Joline Charlton	27	Joline Charlton	10
2000	ACC	7	4	3	0	t-2nd	QF	21	11	8	2	23	NCAA 2nd Round	Emily Taggart	24	Emily Taggart	9
2001	ACC	7	3	4	0	t-5th	SF	20	9	9	2		NCAA 1st Round	Stacy Roeck	20	Stacy Roeck	9
2002	ACC	7	2	4	1	t-7th	QF	22	13	8	1		NCAA 2nd Round	Katherine Winstead	24	Sarah Kozey/Katherine Winstead	9
2003	ACC	7	1	4	2	7th	QF	20	10	7	3		NCAA 1st Round	Sarah Kozey/Elizabeth Remy	17	Sarah Kozey/Elizabeth Remy	6
2004	ACC	9	4	4	1	t-5th	QF	19	10	7	2		NCAA 1st Round	Sarah Kozey	28	Sarah Kozey	12
2005	ACC	10	4	6	0	7th	QF	19	9	9	1		NCAA 1st Round	Elizabeth Remy	25	Sarah Kozey	8
2006	ACC	10	6	4	0	3rd	SF	23	16	6	1	19	NCAA 2nd Round	Elizabeth Remy	23	Elizabeth Remy	9
2007	ACC	10	6	2	2	t-2nd	SF	23	13	7	3	20	NCAA 2nd Round	Jill Hutchinson	22	Jill Hutchinson	10
2008	ACC	10	5	5	0	6th	QF	21	13	8	0	25	NCAA 2nd Round	Jill Hutchinson	27	Jill Hutchinson	10
2009	ACC	10	5	3	2	5th	QF	24	16	6	2	8	NCAA Quarterfinalist	Kaley Fountain/Jill Hutchinson	32	Jill Hutchinson	14
2010	ACC	10	5	4	1	5th	W	24	13	8	3	25	NCAA 2nd Round	Katie Stengel	37	Katie Stengel	16
2011	ACC	10	5	2	3	t-4th	F	26	18	4	4	4	NCAA Semifinalist	Katie Stengel	46	Katie Stengel	19
2012	ACC	10	6	3	1	t-2nd	SF	23	14	6	3	15	NCAA 2nd Round	Katie Stengel	22	Katie Stengel	9
2013	ACC	13	5	6	2	9th		21	12	7	2		NCAA 3rd Round	Riley Ridgik	26	Riley Ridgik	11
2014	ACC	10	3	5	2	t-8th		17	5	9	3			Riley Ridgik	12	Riley Ridgik	5
2015	ACC	10	2	8	0	t-12th		19	5	12	2			Sarah Medina	11	Sarah Medina	4
2016	ACC	10	2	8	0	11th		18	10	8	0			Maddie Huster	14	Peyton Perea	6
2017	ACC	10	5	3	2	t-5th	QF	22	11	7	4		NCAA 2nd Round	Bayley Feist	18	Bayley Feist	8
2018	ACC	10	4	6	0	t-9th		20	9	9	2	25	NCAA 3rd Round	Bayley Feist	18	Bayley Feist	7
2019	ACC	10	1	6	3	12th		18	6	8	4			Hudla Arnasdottir	18	Hudla Arnasdottir	8
2020	ACC	8	3	4	1	9th		14	5	7	2			Sophie Faircloth	10	Sophie Faircloth	4
2021	ACC	10	6	4	0	7th	SF	22	16	6	0	25	NCAA 2nd Round	Shayla Smart	25	Shayla Smart	11
2022	ACC	10	3	6	1	9th		19	9	7	3		NCAA 1st Round	Olivia Stowell	14	Olivia Stowell/Alex Wood	5
2023	ACC	10	4	2	4	6th	QF	18	10	3	5			Caiya Hanks	16	Caiya Hanks/Emily Murphy	6
2024	ACC	10	7	2	1	t-2nd	SF	24	16	4	4	2	NCAA Runner-Up	Caiya Hanks	34	Caiya Hanks	11
2025	ACC	10	4	3	3	9th		20	11	5	4		NCAA 2nd Round	Kylie Maxwell	17	Kylie Maxwell	6
Totals: 25 Seasons	1 Conference	281	114	136	30	1 ACCT title		662	361	232	69			Katie Stengel	125	Katie Stengel	50

== Awards ==
ACC Coach of the Year:

- Tony da Luz – 1998

ACC Offensive Player of the Year:

- Katie Stengel – 2011

ACC Freshman of the Year:

- Emily Taggart – 1998
- Joline Charlton – 1999
- Katie Stengel – 2010
- Kylie Maxwell – 2025

== NSCAA All-Americans ==
Year	Player(s)
2009	Kaley Fountain**
2010	Katie Stengel*
2011	Aubrey Bledsoe*, Katie Stengel
2012	Katie Stengel*
2024	Caiya Hanks, Emily Colton**, Zara Chavoshi***
2025	Valentina Amaral**

- (*) Denotes 2nd Team All-American
- (**) Denotes 3rd Team All-American
- (***) Denotes 4th Team All-American

== All-ACC Players ==
- The players are all first team All-ACC, unless otherwise noted

Year	Player(s)
1997	Stefanie Mathews*
1998	Stefanie Mathews*, Emily Taggart*
1999	Joline Charlton*, Erin Regan, Stacy Roeck*, Emily Taggart
2000	Joline Charlton, Stacy Roeck*, Emily Taggart
2001	Sarah Kate Noftsinger*, Stacy Roeck, Emily Taggart
2002	A.B. Robbins*, Katherine Winstead*
2003	Melanie Schneider*, Alena Thom*
2004	Alli Hunt*, Sarah Kozey*
2005	Sarah Kozey*, Melanie Schneider*
2006	Kristina Hanley*, Elizabeth Remy
2007	Kaley Fountain*, Jill Hutchinson, Allie Sadow*, Amy Smerdzinski*
2008	Kaley Fountain*, Amy Smerdzinski*
2009	Kaley Fountain, Jill Hutchinson
2010	Katie Stengel
2011	Aubrey Bledsoe, Caralee Keppler*, Katie Stengel
2012	Aubrey Bledsoe*, Katie Stengel
2013	Aubrey Bledsoe, Riley Ridgik*, Katie Stengel*
2016	Sarah Teegarden*
2017	Lindsay Preston*, Maddie Huster*, Bayley Feist**, Vicky Krug^
2018	Bayley Feist*, Peyton Perea**, Giovanna DeMarco^
2019	Madison Hammond*
2020	Hannah Betfort**, Sophie Faircloth^
2021	Shayla Smart**, Nikayla Small^
2022	Caiya Hanks^
2023	Caiya Hanks*, Dempsey Brown^
2024	Caiya Hanks, Zara Chavoshi*, Emily Colton*, Emily Murphy*, Valentina Amaral**
2025	Valentina Amaral**, Kylie Maxwell**, Allie Flanagan^, Kylie Maxwell^

- (*) Denotes 2nd Team All-ACC
- (**) Denotes 3rd Team All-ACC
- (^) Denotes All-Freshman ACC Team

== Players in the WPS Draft ==
Year	Player	Round #	Pick #	Overall #	Team
2010	Kaley Fountain	2nd	9	20	FC Gold Pride
2010	Jill Hutchinson	4th	1	30	Atlanta Beat
2010	Caitlin Farrell	7th	2	58	Philadelphia Independence
2011	Caitlin Farrell	2nd	3	11	Philadelphia Independence
2011	Bianca D'Agostino	3rd	6	18	Philadelphia Independence

== Players in the NWSL Draft ==
Year	Player	Round #	Pick #	Overall #	Team
2013	Kristen Meier	3rd	7	23	Seattle Reign FC
2013	Jackie Logue	4th	6	30	Western New York Flash
2018	Ally Haran	3rd	5	25	Seattle Reign FC
2018	Maddie Huster	3rd	6	26	Washington Spirit
2019	Bayley Feist	2nd	8	17	Washington Spirit
2021	Hannah Betfort	4th	7	37	Portland Thorns FC
2022	Ryanne Brown	2nd	9	21	OL Reign
2022	Jenna Menta	3rd	4	30	Racing Louisville FC
2023	Giovanna DeMarco	4th	9	45	San Diego Wave FC

== Notable alumni ==
=== Current Professional Players ===
As of February 2, 2026

- (United States) Aubrey Kingsbury (2010–2013) – Currently with Washington Spirit
- (United States) Katie Stengel (2010–2013) – Currently with Gotham FC
- (United States) Madison Hammond (2016–2019) – Currently with Utah Royals
- (United States) Hannah Betfort (2017–2020) – Currently with North Carolina Courage
- (United States) Ryanne Brown (2017–2021) – Currently with Seattle Reign FC
- (United States) Mariah Lee (2018) – Currently with Vancouver Rise FC
- Oliwia Woś (2018) – Currently with FC Nürnberg and Poland international
- (United States) Giovanna DeMarco (2018–2022) – Currently with Carolina Ascent FC
- (United States) Kaitlyn Parks (2019–2022) – Currently with Sporting JAX
- (United States) Laurel Ansbrow (2021–2024) – Currently with Boston Legacy FC
- Zara Chavoshi (2021–2024) – Currently with Orlando Pride, and Canada international
- (Canada) Nikayla Small (2021–2024) – Currently with AFC Toronto
- (United States) Caiya Hanks (2022–2024) – Currently with – Portland Thorns FC
- Emily Murphy (2023–2024) – Currently with Newcastle United and Republic of Ireland international
- (United States) Emily Colton (2024) – Currently with DC Power FC
