= 2024 NCAA Division I women's soccer season =

American college soccer season

- Number of teams: 349
- Preseason No. 1: Florida State
- Hermann Trophy: Kate Faasse
- Top goalscorer: Kate Faasse – North Carolina – 20 goals

Statistics
- Biggest home win: 10 goals: Arkansas 10–0 Northwestern State; Florida State 10–0 North Florida; Indiana State 10–0 Saint Mary-of-the-Woods
- Biggest away win: 9 goals: Towson 9–0 Delaware State
- Highest scoring: 12 goals: Utah State 9–3 Pacific
- Longest winning run: 18 games, Florida State (September 29, 2023 – August 29, 2024)
- Longest unbeaten run: 31 games, Florida State (August 17, 2023 – October 3, 2024)
- Longest winless run: 35 games, Delaware State (October 26, 2022 – present)
- Longest losing run: 20 games Hampton (October 23, 2022 – August 18, 2024)

Tournament
- Duration: November 15 – December 9, 2024
- Most conference bids: Big Ten & SEC – 10 bids

College Cup
- Date: December 9, 2024
- Site: WakeMed Soccer Park; Cary, North Carolina
- Champions: North Carolina
- Runners-up: Wake Forest

Seasons
- ← 2023 2025 →

The 2024 NCAA Division I women's soccer season was the 43rd season of NCAA championship women's college soccer.

The season began on August 15, 2024, and culminated on December 9, 2024, with the 2024 NCAA Division I women's soccer tournament, with the College Cup being held at WakeMed Soccer Park in Cary, North Carolina.

Florida State are the defending NCAA champions. Florida State was the first undefeated champion since Stanford in 2011. Florida State was unable to defend their title, falling to Vanderbilt in penalties in the Second Round. Four teams from the ACC qualified for the college cup, and North Carolina prevailed, claiming their twenty-second college cup.

== Changes from 2023 ==
=== Coaching changes ===
There were 36 coaching changes during the 2023–24 offseason.

Program	Outgoing coach	Manner of departure	Date of vacancy	Incoming coach	Date of appointment	References
Arkansas Pine-Bluff	Erik Solberg	Accepted Head Coaching job with Gardner-Webb	January 12, 2024	Jayme Selph	July 8, 2024	
Boston College	Jason Lowe	Fired	October 31, 2023	Chris Watkins	December 14, 2023	
Bowling Green	Jimmy Walker	Accepted Head Coaching job with Creighton	November 21, 2023	Chris Fox	December 20, 2023	
Cal State Northridge	Christine Johnson	Resigned	December 20, 2023	Gina Brewer	February 21, 2024	
Cleveland State	Dallas Boyer	Fired	November 3, 2023	Mark Sappington	January 5, 2024	
Creighton	Ross Paule	Fired	October 30, 2023	Jimmy Walker	November 21, 2023	
Eastern Michigan	Scott Hall	Retired	October 27, 2023	Taylor Clarke	December 12, 2023	
Hampton	Matheau Hall	End Interim Period	October 22, 2023	Scot Vorwold	January 8, 2024	
Gardner-Webb	Tina Murphy	Unknown	November 2023	Erik Solberg	January 12, 2024	
George Mason	Manya Puppione	Fired	November 7, 2023	Aaron Brunner	December 20, 2023	
George Washington	Michelle Demko	Contract not renewed	October 25, 2023	Jeremy Williams	December 22, 2023	
Gonzaga	Chris Watkins	Accepted Head Coaching job with Boston College	December 14, 2023	Katie Benz	December 15, 2023	
Illinois State	Marisa Kresge	Fired	October 31, 2023	Raleigh DeRose	December 13, 2023	
Jacksonville	John Constable	Fired	October 31, 2023	Ryan Moon	December 19, 2023	
Kansas	Mark Francis	Retired	October 24, 2023	Nate Lie	December 4, 2023	
Kennesaw State	Benji Walton	Resigned	December 22, 2023	Chris Cahill	February 28, 2024	
LIU	Lucy Gillett		June 3, 2024	Tom Giovatto	June 3, 2024	
Loyola-Chicago	Barry Bimbi	Fired	July 16, 2024	Angela Staveskie (interim)	July 16, 2024	
Marquette	Frank Pelaez	Stepped Down	December 16, 2023	Chris Allen	January 18, 2024	
Marshall	Michael Swan	Fired	October 30, 2023	Rafa Simoes	December 29, 2023	
Miami (FL)	Sarah Barnes	Fired	November 2, 2023	Ken Masuhr	December 5, 2023	
Morehead State	Chris Fox	Accepted Head Coaching job with Bowling Green	December 19, 2023	Paul Cox	January 20, 2024	
North Carolina	Anson Dorrance	Retired	August 11, 2024	Damon Nahas	August 11, 2024	
Oakland	Juan Pablo Favero	Retired	February 12, 2024	Devin Zvosec	May 10, 2024	
Presbyterian	Brian Purcell	Retired	November 2, 2023	Matt Smith	December 27, 2023	
Purdue	Drew Roff	Fired	October 27, 2023	Richard Moodie	November 28, 2023	
Robert Morris	Chris Shaw	Accepted Head Coaching job with Temple	January 4, 2024	Michelle Rick	February 8, 2024	
San Diego	Louise Lieberman	Did not return	November 9, 2023	Greg LaPorte	December 21, 2023	
South Alabama	Richard Moodie	Accepted Head Coaching job at Purdue	November 28, 2023	Chris Hennessey	December 15, 2023	
South Florida	Denise Schilte-Brown	Retired	October 31, 2023	Chris Brown	November 28, 2023	
Stephen F. Austin	Tony Minatta	Fired	October 3, 2023	Ben Williams	November 14, 2023	
Stetson	Chris Bergmann	Stepped down	November 2, 2023	Jamie Souza	December 20, 2023	
Temple	Nick Bochette	Fired	November 1, 2023	Chris Shaw	January 1, 2024	
Texas A&M-Corpus Christi	Craig Shaw	Resigned	January 31, 2024	Daniel Clitnovici	March 6, 2024	
Texas Southern	Lindsay Vera	Resigned	December 1, 2023	Kendall Ayers	January 9, 2024	
UNC Greensboro	Michael Coll	Mutually parted ways	November 29, 2023	Stefani Workman	April 11, 2024	
Wyoming	Colleen Corbin	Resigned	March 5, 2024	Josh Purdum	April 10, 2024	
Xavier	Nate Lie	Accepted Head Coaching job with Kansas	December 4, 2023	Dean Ward	December 20, 2023	

=== Conference realignment ===
School	Current conference	Future conference
Arizona	Pac-12	Big 12
Arizona State	Pac-12	Big 12
California	Pac-12	ACC
Chicago State	Independent	NEC
Colorado	Pac-12	Big 12
Kennesaw State	ASUN	CUSA
Mercyhurst	PSAC (NCAA D-II)	NEC
Merrimack	NEC	MAAC
Oklahoma	Big 12	SEC
Oregon	Pac-12	Big Ten
Oregon State	Pac-12 (Note: The Pac-12 will technically remain in operation as a two-member conference through 2025–26, but Oregon State and Washington State have made arrangements to house most of their sports in the West Coast Conference until that time.)	WCC
Sacred Heart	NEC	MAAC
SMU	American	ACC
Stanford	Pac-12	ACC
Stephen F. Austin	WAC	Southland
Texas	Big 12	SEC
UCLA	Pac-12	Big Ten
USC	Pac-12	Big Ten
Utah	Pac-12	Big 12
UTRGV	WAC	Southland
Washington	Pac-12	Big Ten
Washington State	Pac-12	WCC
West Georgia	GSC (NCAA D-II)	ASUN

=== Other headlines ===
- September 12 – The Pac-12 Conference, which had been reduced to two members after its remaining ten schools left for other power conferences, began a rebuilding process by announcing that Mountain West Conference members Boise State, Colorado State, Fresno State and San Diego State would join the Pac-12 in 2026–27.
- September 24 – The Pac-12 Conference's rebuilding continued as Utah State would join the other Mountain West defectors in 2026–27.
- September 30 – Gonzaga announced it would leave the West Coast Conference to join the Pac-12 Conference for all sports in 2026–27 except for football, which it has not sponsored since 1941.
- October 1 – UTEP announced it would join the Mountain West from Conference USA in 2026–27.
- October 9 – The NCAA Division I Council took the following actions that affected women's soccer at that day's meeting:
  - The National Letter of Intent program was abolished, effective immediately. Written offers of athletics aid will replace the NLI.
  - A proposed rule change that would shorten the transition periods for schools wishing to reclassify from Division II or Division III to Division I was introduced. If approved at the council's January 2025 meeting, the transition periods for D-II and D-III schools would drop by a year, respectively to three and four years.
- October 15 – The Mountain West announced that Hawaiʻi, which has been a football-only member of that conference since 2012, would leave the Big West Conference in 2026 to become a full MW member.
- November 1 – The Mountain West announced that Grand Canyon would join the conference no later than 2026 for all sports except for football, which the school has never sponsored. Grand Canyon's official announcement stated that it would not compete in the West Coast Conference, which it had previously been scheduled to join in July 2025, and that if MW bylaws allowed, it would join that conference in 2025.
- November 7 – The Texas A&M University System Board of Regents approved the name change of the former Texas A&M University–Commerce to East Texas A&M University.

== Rankings ==
=== Preseason polls ===
United Soccer Coaches
Rank	Team
1	Florida State
2	Stanford
3	BYU
4	Penn State
5	Clemson
6	Nebraska
7	Pittsburgh
8	North Carolina
8	Texas Tech
10	Memphis
11	UCLA
12	Saint Louis
13	Michigan State
14	Georgia
15	Notre Dame
16	Arkansas
17	Texas
18	Mississippi State
19	Wisconsin
20	Alabama
21	South Carolina
22	Santa Clara
23	USC
24	Duke
25	Iowa; Texas A&M

Top Drawer Soccer
Rank	Team
1	Florida State
2	Stanford
3	Pittsburgh
4	Texas
5	UCLA
6	Clemson
7	Penn State
8	Saint Louis
9	Nebraska
10	Memphis
11	Georgia
12	Notre Dame
13	North Carolina
14	BYU
15	Mississippi State
16	Michigan State
17	Arkansas
18	Texas Tech
19	Harvard
20	USC
21	Georgetown
22	South Carolina
23	Virginia
24	Colorado
25	Santa Clara

== Regular season ==
=== Major upsets ===
In this list, a "major upset" is defined as a game won by a team ranked 10 or more spots lower or an unranked team that defeats a team ranked No. 15 or higher.

All rankings are from the United Soccer Coaches Poll.

Date	Winner	Score	Loser
August 15	Auburn	4–0	No. 5 Clemson
August 15	Oklahoma State	2–0	No. 6 Nebraska
August 22	Buffalo	2–1	No. 7 Pittsburgh
August 22	No. 21т Virginia	2–1	No. 3 Penn State
September 1	Pepperdine	1–0	No. 3 UCLA
September 5	Duke	1–0	No. 2 North Carolina
September 8	Kentucky	2–0	No. 9т UCLA
September 12	Tennessee	1–0	No. 7 Memphis
September 15	Wake Forest	3–0	No. 2 Virginia
September 19	No. 13 Wake Forest	1–0	No. 1 Stanford
September 22	No. 24 Mississippi State	1–0	No. 11 Texas
September 22	Texas Tech	2–0	No. 12 Oklahoma State
September 26	Texas A&M	4–1	No. 8 Auburn
October 6	Virginia Tech	3–2	No. 6 Florida State
October 10	Minnesota	2–3	No. 8 Ohio State
October 10	Wisconsin	2–1	No. 9 Iowa
October 10	Wyoming	2–0	No. 11 Utah State
October 13	Washington	2–1	No. 5 Michigan State
October 19	Loyola Marymount	3–0	No. 13 Pepperdine
October 25	BYU	2–1	No. 14 Texas Tech
October 25	No. 17 Florida State	4–2	No. 4 North Carolina
October 27	Minnesota	2–1	No. 11 Iowa
October 27	No. 19 Virginia Tech	2–0	No. 7 Notre Dame
October 31	California	3–2	No. 14т Stanford
October 31	Virginia	1–0	No. 12 Virginia Tech
November 2	Oregon State	2–1	No. 11 Santa Clara
November 7	No. 21 Texas	2–1	No. 5 Arkansas
November 9	Kansas	1–0	No. 7 TCU
November 22	Minnesota	2–1	No. 14т South Carolina
November 22	No. 22т Penn State	3–1	No. 7 TCU
November 24	No. 13 Notre Dame	2–0	No. 2 Mississippi State

=== Conference standings ===
2024 American Athletic Conference women's soccer standings
	Conf.						Overall
Team	W		L		T	PCT	W		L		T	PCT
Memphis ‍†‍‍	6	–	0	–	4	.800	13	–	2	–	4	.789
South Florida ‍‍‍	6	–	1	–	3	.750	12	–	2	–	5	.763
East Carolina ‍‍‡‍^{y}	5	–	2	–	3	.650	10	–	4	–	7	.643
Rice ‍‍‍	5	–	4	–	1	.550	12	–	6	–	2	.650
UAB ‍‍‍	4	–	2	–	4	.600	7	–	5	–	5	.559
Charlotte ‍‍‍	3	–	2	–	5	.550	4	–	8	–	7	.395
North Texas ‍‍‍	3	–	3	–	4	.500	7	–	6	–	6	.526
Tulsa ‍‍‍	3	–	5	–	2	.400	7	–	9	–	4	.450
UTSA ‍‍‍	3	–	5	–	2	.400	8	–	7	–	3	.528
Florida Atlantic ‍‍‍	2	–	6	–	2	.300	3	–	11	–	4	.278
Temple ‍‍‍	0	–	10	–	0	.000	2	–	17	–	0	.105
† – Conference champion ‡ – 2024 AAC Tournament champion y – Invited to the NCAA Tournament; As of December 10, 2024; Rankings from United Soccer Coaches Poll; Source:American Athletic Conference

2024 America East Conference women's soccer standings
	Conf.						Overall
Team	W		L		T	PCT	W		L		T	PCT
Maine ‍†‍‡‍^{y}	7	–	0	–	1	.938	13	–	2	–	3	.806
New Hampshire ‍‍‍	6	–	2	–	0	.750	12	–	5	–	1	.694
Binghamton ‍‍‍	4	–	2	–	2	.625	7	–	6	–	5	.528
UMass Lowell ‍‍‍	4	–	3	–	1	.563	6	–	10	–	3	.395
Bryant ‍‍‍	3	–	4	–	1	.438	5	–	9	–	4	.389
Vermont ‍‍‍	3	–	4	–	1	.438	8	–	5	–	5	.583
Albany ‍‍‍	2	–	5	–	1	.313	3	–	12	–	1	.219
NJIT ‍‍‍	1	–	5	–	2	.250	4	–	10	–	3	.324
UMBC ‍‍‍	1	–	6	–	1	.188	5	–	12	–	1	.306
† – Conference champion ‡ – 2024 America East Tournament champion y – Invited to the NCAA Tournament; As of December 10, 2024; Rankings from United Soccer Coaches Poll; Source:America East Conference

2024 Atlantic 10 Conference women's soccer standings
	Conf.						Overall
Team	W		L		T	PCT	W		L		T	PCT
No. 22 Saint Louis ‍†‍‡‍^{y}	7	–	0	–	3	.850	15	–	2	–	6	.783
Dayton ‍‍‍	7	–	1	–	2	.800	14	–	4	–	2	.750
UMass ‍‍‍	6	–	2	–	2	.700	13	–	5	–	3	.690
Fordham ‍‍‍	5	–	2	–	3	.650	10	–	5	–	4	.632
Saint Joseph's ‍‍‍	4	–	1	–	5	.650	9	–	4	–	7	.625
Loyola-Chicago ‍‍‍	4	–	2	–	4	.600	9	–	5	–	5	.605
VCU ‍‍‍	3	–	2	–	5	.550	4	–	9	–	5	.361
Davidson ‍‍‍	4	–	5	–	1	.450	8	–	8	–	3	.500
Rhode Island ‍‍‍	4	–	5	–	1	.450	7	–	8	–	3	.472
LaSalle ‍‍‍	3	–	4	–	3	.450	8	–	5	–	5	.583
Duquesne ‍‍‍	3	–	6	–	1	.350	8	–	7	–	1	.531
George Mason ‍‍‍	1	–	5	–	4	.300	3	–	10	–	6	.316
George Washington ‍‍‍	2	–	7	–	1	.250	4	–	11	–	3	.306
Richmond ‍‍‍	2	–	7	–	1	.250	4	–	10	–	3	.324
St. Bonaventure ‍‍‍	1	–	7	–	2	.200	2	–	13	–	3	.194
† – Conference champion ‡ – 2024 Atlantic 10 Tournament champion y – Invited to the NCAA Tournament; As of December 10, 2024; Rankings from United Soccer Coaches Poll; Source:A10 Conference

2024 ASUN Conference women's soccer standings
	Conf.						Overall
Team	W		L		T	PCT	W		L		T	PCT
Florida Gulf Coast ‍†‍‍	9	–	1	–	1	.864	11	–	6	–	2	.632
Central Arkansas ‍‍‍	8	–	1	–	2	.818	9	–	7	–	2	.556
Lipscomb ‍‍‡‍^{y}	7	–	1	–	3	.773	14	–	4	–	4	.727
Eastern Kentucky ‍‍‍	7	–	3	–	1	.682	12	–	8	–	3	.587
North Florida ‍‍‍	6	–	1	–	4	.727	9	–	4	–	7	.625
Austin Peay ‍‍‍	5	–	3	–	3	.591	7	–	6	–	6	.526
Bellarmine ‍‍‍	4	–	6	–	1	.409	5	–	12	–	3	.325
Jacksonville ‍‍‍	3	–	6	–	2	.364	4	–	10	–	4	.333
Stetson ‍‍‍	3	–	8	–	0	.273	8	–	11	–	0	.421
Queens ‍‍‍	1	–	6	–	4	.273	5	–	10	–	4	.368
West Georgia ‍‍‍	1	–	9	–	1	.136	2	–	14	–	1	.147
North Alabama ‍‍‍	1	–	10	–	0	.091	3	–	14	–	0	.176
† – Conference champion ‡ – 2024 ASUN Tournament champion y – Invited to the NCAA Tournament; As of December 10, 2024; Rankings from United Soccer Coaches Poll; Source:Atlantic Sun Conference

2024 ACC women's soccer standings
	Conf.						Overall
Team	W		L		T	PCT	W		L		T	PCT
No. 3 Duke ‍†‍‍^{y}	9	–	0	–	1	.950	18	–	3	–	1	.841
No. 2 Wake Forest ‍‍‍^{y}	7	–	2	–	1	.750	16	–	4	–	4	.750
No. 13 Florida State ‍‍‡‍^{y}	7	–	2	–	1	.750	15	–	2	–	4	.810
No. 1 North Carolina ‍‍‍^{y}	7	–	3	–	0	.700	22	–	5	–	0	.815
No. 7 Virginia Tech ‍‍‍^{y}	6	–	2	–	2	.700	14	–	6	–	3	.674
No. 6 Notre Dame ‍‍‍^{y}	5	–	1	–	4	.700	14	–	4	–	4	.727
California ‍‍‍^{y}	5	–	4	–	1	.550	13	–	6	–	2	.667
No. 4 Stanford ‍‍‍^{y}	5	–	4	–	1	.550	16	–	5	–	2	.739
Virginia ‍‍‍^{y}	5	–	5	–	0	.500	13	–	5	–	1	.711
Boston College ‍‍‍	4	–	4	–	2	.500	12	–	5	–	2	.684
Pittsburgh ‍‍‍	3	–	5	–	2	.400	9	–	6	–	3	.583
Louisville ‍‍‍	2	–	5	–	3	.350	7	–	6	–	5	.528
SMU ‍‍‍	2	–	6	–	2	.300	6	–	9	–	2	.412
Clemson ‍‍‍	2	–	7	–	1	.250	6	–	8	–	3	.441
Miami (FL) ‍‍‍	1	–	6	–	3	.250	5	–	8	–	4	.412
NC State ‍‍‍	1	–	6	–	3	.250	4	–	10	–	4	.333
Syracuse ‍‍‍	0	–	9	–	1	.050	6	–	10	–	2	.389
† – Conference champion ‡ – 2024 ACC Tournament champion y – Invited to the NCAA Tournament; As of December 10, 2024; Rankings from United Soccer Coaches Poll; Source: The ACC

2024 Big East Conference women's soccer standings
	Conf.						Overall
Team	W		L		T	PCT	W		L		T	PCT
Georgetown ‍†‍‍^{y}	8	–	1	–	1	.850	13	–	3	–	4	.750
Xavier ‍‍‍	7	–	2	–	1	.750	15	–	4	–	2	.762
Butler ‍‍‍	5	–	2	–	3	.650	10	–	4	–	5	.658
Creighton ‍‍‍	5	–	4	–	1	.550	8	–	7	–	2	.529
Connecticut ‍‍‡‍^{y}	4	–	3	–	3	.550	12	–	5	–	4	.667
DePaul ‍‍‍	3	–	3	–	4	.500	5	–	8	–	7	.425
Villanova ‍‍‍	2	–	3	–	5	.450	5	–	7	–	6	.444
Providence ‍‍‍	3	–	5	–	2	.400	6	–	9	–	3	.417
Marquette ‍‍‍	3	–	6	–	1	.350	6	–	11	–	3	.375
St. John's ‍‍‍	1	–	6	–	3	.250	6	–	7	–	5	.472
Seton Hall ‍‍‍	1	–	7	–	2	.200	4	–	12	–	3	.289
† – Conference champion ‡ – 2024 Big East Tournament champion y – Invited to the NCAA Tournament; As of December 10, 2024; Rankings from United Soccer Coaches Poll; Source:The Big East Conference

2024 Big Sky Conference women's soccer standings
	Conf.						Overall
Team	W		L		T	PCT	W		L		T	PCT
Montana ‍†‍‍	6	–	0	–	2	.875	12	–	2	–	5	.763
Idaho ‍‍‍	5	–	2	–	1	.688	12	–	5	–	3	.675
Eastern Washington ‍‍‍	4	–	1	–	3	.688	9	–	5	–	5	.605
Northern Arizona ‍‍‍	4	–	3	–	1	.563	4	–	7	–	6	.412
Sacramento St. ‍‍‡‍^{y}	3	–	2	–	3	.563	5	–	7	–	9	.452
Portland St. ‍‍‍	2	–	3	–	3	.438	4	–	9	–	5	.361
Northern Colorado ‍‍‍	2	–	5	–	1	.313	4	–	14	–	1	.237
Weber St. ‍‍‍	1	–	6	–	1	.188	2	–	13	–	5	.225
Idaho St. ‍‍‍	1	–	6	–	1	.188	2	–	10	–	5	.265
† – Conference champion ‡ – 2024 Big Sky Tournament champion y – Invited to the NCAA Tournament; As of December 10, 2024; Rankings from United Soccer Coaches Poll; Source:The Big Sky Conference

2024 Big South Conference women's soccer standings
	Conf.						Overall
Team	W		L		T	PCT	W		L		T	PCT
USC Upstate (2.13) ‍†‍‡‍^{y}	5	–	1	–	2	.750	10	–	5	–	4	.632
High Point (2.00) ‍‍‍	5	–	2	–	1	.688	9	–	7	–	3	.553
Radford (1.71) ‍‍‍	3	–	1	–	3	.643	9	–	4	–	5	.639
Longwood (1.50) ‍‍‍	3	–	2	–	3	.563	4	–	9	–	6	.368
Presbyterian (1.29) ‍‍‍	2	–	2	–	3	.500	7	–	6	–	5	.528
UNC Asheville (1.00) ‍‍‍	2	–	4	–	0	.333	4	–	12	–	1	.265
Charleston Southern (1.00) ‍‍‍	2	–	4	–	1	.357	5	–	7	–	3	.433
Gardner-Webb (0.75) ‍‍‍	1	–	4	–	3	.313	4	–	11	–	4	.316
Winthrop (0.57) ‍‍‍	0	–	3	–	4	.286	3	–	7	–	4	.357
† – Conference champion ‡ – 2024 Big South Tournament champion y – Invited to the NCAA Tournament; As of December 10, 2024; Rankings from United Soccer Coaches Poll; Source:Big South Conference Note:Due to three matches unable to be re-scheduled due to the aftermath of Hurricane Helene, the Big South’s “Unequal Games Played” policy takes effect, which uses an average points per game system for league wins/ties to determine official standings order. Each team's point average is listed in parentheses.

2024 Big Ten Conference women's soccer standings
	Conf.						Overall
Team	W		L		T	PCT	W		L		T	PCT
No. 5 USC ‍†‍‍^{y}	10	–	0	–	1	.955	18	–	1	–	4	.870
No. 18 UCLA ‍‍‡‍^{y}	8	–	1	–	2	.818	17	–	4	–	3	.771
No. 12 Iowa ‍‍‍^{y}	8	–	2	–	1	.773	15	–	3	–	4	.773
No. 14 Michigan St ‍‍‍^{y}	7	–	1	–	3	.773	14	–	3	–	5	.750
Rutgers ‍‍‍^{y}	6	–	2	–	3	.682	11	–	5	–	5	.643
Washington ‍‍‍^{y}	7	–	4	–	0	.636	10	–	7	–	4	.571
No. 17 Minnesota ‍‍‍^{y}	6	–	3	–	2	.636	14	–	5	–	3	.705
No. 11 Ohio St ‍‍‍^{y}	6	–	3	–	2	.636	14	–	6	–	3	.674
No. 19 Wisconsin ‍‍‍^{y}	5	–	3	–	3	.591	10	–	6	–	4	.600
No. 8 Penn St ‍‍‍^{y}	5	–	4	–	2	.545	15	–	7	–	3	.660
Illinois ‍‍‍	4	–	6	–	1	.409	8	–	8	–	2	.500
Purdue ‍‍‍	3	–	7	–	1	.318	7	–	9	–	2	.444
Nebraska ‍‍‍	3	–	7	–	1	.318	6	–	10	–	1	.382
Michigan ‍‍‍	2	–	8	–	1	.227	3	–	13	–	2	.222
Northwestern ‍‍‍	1	–	8	–	2	.182	6	–	10	–	3	.395
Maryland ‍‍‍	1	–	8	–	2	.182	4	–	10	–	5	.342
Oregon ‍‍‍	1	–	8	–	2	.182	5	–	11	–	2	.333
Indiana ‍‍‍	1	–	9	–	1	.136	6	–	9	–	2	.412
† – Conference champion ‡ – 2024 Big Ten Tournament champion y – Invited to the NCAA Tournament; As of December 10, 2024; Rankings from United Soccer Coaches Poll; Source:Big Ten

2024 Big West Conference women's soccer standings
	Conf.						Overall
Team	W		L		T	PCT	W		L		T	PCT
Hawaii ‍†‍‍	8	–	1	–	1	.850	12	–	8	–	1	.595
UC Davis ‍‍‍	6	–	2	–	2	.700	13	–	5	–	2	.700
UC Santa Barbara ‍‍‡‍^{y}	4	–	2	–	4	.600	8	–	6	–	9	.543
UC Irvine ‍‍‍	4	–	2	–	4	.600	6	–	7	–	6	.474
Cal State Bakersfield ‍‍‍	4	–	3	–	3	.550	8	–	10	–	5	.457
Cal State Fullerton ‍‍‍	4	–	3	–	3	.550	6	–	10	–	4	.400
Cal State Northridge ‍‍‍	3	–	4	–	3	.450	5	–	11	–	3	.342
Long Beach St ‍‍‍	3	–	5	–	2	.400	6	–	9	–	3	.417
Cal Poly ‍‍‍	3	–	6	–	1	.350	5	–	11	–	3	.342
UC San Diego ‍‍‍	1	–	6	–	3	.250	3	–	12	–	4	.263
UC Riverside ‍‍‍	0	–	6	–	4	.200	2	–	13	–	4	.211
† – Conference champion ‡ – 2024 Big West Tournament champion y – Invited to the NCAA Tournament; As of December 10, 2024; Rankings from United Soccer Coaches Poll; Source:The Big West Conference

2024 Big 12 Conference women's soccer standings
	Conf.						Overall
Team	W		L		T	PCT	W		L		T	PCT
No. 16 TCU ‍†‍‍^{y}	9	–	0	–	2	.909	17	–	4	–	2	.783
No. 24 Texas Tech ‍‍‍^{y}	8	–	1	–	2	.818	15	–	5	–	2	.727
West Virginia ‍‍‍^{y}	8	–	2	–	1	.773	12	–	5	–	3	.675
BYU ‍‍‍^{y}	6	–	2	–	3	.682	9	–	7	–	5	.548
Oklahoma State ‍‍‍^{y}	6	–	3	–	2	.636	14	–	5	–	3	.705
Kansas ‍‍‡‍^{y}	6	–	4	–	1	.591	13	–	6	–	4	.652
Arizona ‍‍‍	6	–	4	–	1	.591	11	–	6	–	2	.632
Utah ‍‍‍	5	–	3	–	3	.591	8	–	6	–	5	.553
Colorado ‍‍‍^{y}	4	–	2	–	5	.591	12	–	5	–	5	.659
Baylor ‍‍‍	2	–	5	–	4	.364	8	–	8	–	5	.500
Arizona State ‍‍‍	3	–	7	–	1	.318	8	–	8	–	3	.500
Cincinnati ‍‍‍	2	–	6	–	3	.318	6	–	9	–	4	.421
UCF ‍‍‍	1	–	5	–	4	.300	3	–	6	–	6	.400
Iowa State ‍‍‍	1	–	5	–	4	.300	3	–	9	–	6	.333
Houston ‍‍‍	1	–	10	–	0	.091	4	–	12	–	1	.265
Kansas State ‍‍‍	0	–	9	–	2	.091	3	–	12	–	3	.250
† – Conference champion ‡ – 2024 Big 12 Tournament champion y – Invited to the NCAA Tournament; As of December 10, 2024; Rankings from United Soccer Coaches Poll; Source: The Big 12 Conference

2024 Coastal Athletic Association women's soccer standings
	Conf.						Overall
Team	W		L		T	PCT	W		L		T	PCT
Monmouth ‍†‍‍	7	–	1	–	2	.800	12	–	3	–	5	.725
Stony Brook ‍†‍‡‍^{y}	7	–	1	–	2	.800	14	–	4	–	3	.738
Elon ‍‍‍	7	–	3	–	0	.700	13	–	4	–	1	.750
Hofstra ‍‍‍	5	–	3	–	2	.600	8	–	5	–	6	.579
Delaware ‍‍‍	4	–	2	–	4	.600	6	–	7	–	6	.474
Charleston ‍‍‍	4	–	2	–	4	.600	11	–	4	–	5	.675
Towson ‍‍‍	4	–	2	–	4	.600	6	–	4	–	9	.553
Campbell ‍‍‍	4	–	6	–	0	.400	6	–	9	–	3	.417
Northeastern ‍‍‍	2	–	4	–	4	.400	2	–	9	–	7	.306
William & Mary ‍‍‍	3	–	7	–	0	.300	8	–	10	–	0	.444
UNC Wilmington ‍‍‍	2	–	5	–	3	.350	4	–	9	–	5	.361
Drexel ‍‍‍	2	–	5	–	3	.350	4	–	9	–	4	.353
Hampton ‍‍‍	0	–	10	–	0	.000	3	–	14	–	1	.194
† – Conference champion ‡ – 2024 CAA Tournament champion y – Invited to the NCAA Tournament; As of December 10, 2024; Rankings from United Soccer Coaches Poll; Source: Coastal Athletic Association

2024 Conference USA women's soccer standings
	Conf.						Overall
Team	W		L		T	PCT	W		L		T	PCT
Florida International ‍†‍‡‍^{y}	6	–	1	–	2	.778	13	–	5	–	2	.700
Liberty ‍†‍‍	6	–	1	–	2	.778	15	–	2	–	4	.810
New Mexico St ‍‍‍	5	–	2	–	2	.667	11	–	5	–	3	.658
Sam Houston ‍‍‍	5	–	4	–	0	.556	8	–	8	–	2	.500
Middle Tennessee ‍‍‍	5	–	4	–	0	.556	9	–	10	–	0	.474
Jacksonville State ‍‍‍	3	–	4	–	2	.444	8	–	9	–	2	.474
Kennesaw State ‍‍‍	2	–	4	–	3	.389	3	–	10	–	4	.294
Western Kentucky ‍‍‍	1	–	3	–	5	.389	3	–	8	–	5	.344
UTEP ‍‍‍	2	–	5	–	2	.333	5	–	8	–	4	.412
Louisiana Tech ‍‍‍	0	–	7	–	2	.111	2	–	10	–	5	.265
† – Conference champion ‡ – 2024 C-USA Tournament champion y – Invited to the NCAA Tournament; As of December 10, 2024; Rankings from United Soccer Coaches Poll; Source:Conference USA

2024 Horizon League women's soccer standings
	Conf.						Overall
Team	W		L		T	PCT	W		L		T	PCT
Milwaukee ‍†‍‡‍^{y}	9	–	0	–	1	.950	12	–	7	–	2	.619
Northern Kentucky ‍‍‍	8	–	1	–	1	.850	12	–	7	–	1	.625
Detroit Mercy ‍‍‍	7	–	1	–	2	.800	10	–	8	–	2	.550
Robert Morris ‍‍‍	4	–	3	–	3	.550	6	–	7	–	7	.475
IU Indy ‍‍‍	4	–	4	–	2	.500	5	–	11	–	3	.342
Purdue Fort Wayne ‍‍‍	4	–	6	–	0	.400	9	–	10	–	1	.475
Wright State ‍‍‍	3	–	5	–	2	.400	5	–	10	–	2	.353
Green Bay ‍‍‍	2	–	5	–	3	.350	4	–	8	–	5	.382
Youngstown State ‍‍‍	3	–	7	–	0	.300	5	–	11	–	2	.333
Oakland ‍‍‍	2	–	8	–	0	.200	3	–	14	–	2	.211
Cleveland State ‍‍‍	2	–	8	–	0	.200	2	–	14	–	1	.147
† – Conference champion ‡ – 2024 Horizon League Tournament champion y – Invited to the NCAA Tournament; As of December 10, 2024; Rankings from United Soccer Coaches Poll; Source:Horizon League

2024 Ivy League women's soccer standings
	Conf.						Overall
Team	W		L		T	PCT	W		L		T	PCT
Princeton ‍†‍‡‍^{y}	6	–	1	–	0	.857	14	–	5	–	0	.737
Columbia ‍‍‍	5	–	1	–	1	.786	7	–	5	–	4	.563
Brown ‍‍‍	3	–	2	–	2	.571	7	–	4	–	6	.588
Harvard ‍‍‍	3	–	3	–	1	.500	7	–	4	–	5	.594
Yale ‍‍‍	2	–	4	–	1	.357	8	–	7	–	1	.531
Penn ‍‍‍	1	–	3	–	3	.357	2	–	8	–	6	.313
Cornell ‍‍‍	2	–	5	–	0	.286	3	–	9	–	4	.313
Dartmouth ‍‍‍	1	–	4	–	2	.286	7	–	6	–	3	.531
† – Conference champion ‡ – 2024 Ivy League Tournament champion y – Invited to the NCAA Tournament; As of December 10, 2024; Rankings from United Soccer Coaches Poll; Source:Ivy League

2024 Mid-American Conference women's soccer standings
	Conf.						Overall
Team	W		L		T	PCT	W		L		T	PCT
Western Michigan ‍†‍‡‍^{y}	8	–	0	–	3	.864	13	–	2	–	6	.762
Buffalo ‍‍‍	5	–	1	–	5	.682	11	–	2	–	7	.725
Ohio ‍‍‍	5	–	3	–	3	.591	11	–	5	–	4	.650
Kent State ‍‍‍	5	–	4	–	2	.545	9	–	7	–	3	.553
Miami (OH) ‍‍‍	4	–	3	–	4	.545	8	–	5	–	6	.579
Bowling Green ‍‍‍	4	–	4	–	3	.500	7	–	7	–	4	.500
Eastern Michigan ‍‍‍	3	–	3	–	5	.500	7	–	6	–	5	.528
Northern Illinois ‍‍‍	3	–	4	–	4	.455	9	–	5	–	5	.605
Central Michigan ‍‍‍	3	–	4	–	4	.455	5	–	8	–	5	.417
Toledo ‍‍‍	3	–	4	–	4	.455	6	–	7	–	5	.472
Ball State ‍‍‍	2	–	6	–	3	.318	7	–	8	–	3	.472
Akron ‍‍‍	0	–	9	–	2	.091	5	–	9	–	4	.389
† – Conference champion ‡ – 2024 MAC Tournament champion y – Invited to the NCAA Tournament; As of December 10, 2024; Rankings from United Soccer Coaches Poll; Source:Mid-American Conference

2024 MAAC women's soccer standings
	Conf.						Overall
Team	W		L		T	PCT	W		L		T	PCT
Fairfield ‍†‍‡‍^{y}	10	–	1	–	1	.875	18	–	3	–	1	.841
Quinnipiac ‍‍‍	10	–	2	–	0	.833	14	–	5	–	1	.725
Canisius ‍‍‍	8	–	2	–	2	.750	12	–	4	–	3	.711
Siena ‍‍‍	7	–	3	–	2	.667	10	–	8	–	2	.550
Manhattan ‍‍‍	5	–	4	–	3	.542	10	–	7	–	3	.575
Merrimack ‍‍‍	5	–	5	–	2	.500	7	–	9	–	3	.447
Iona ‍‍‍	4	–	6	–	2	.417	6	–	10	–	4	.400
Sacred Heart ‍‍‍	3	–	5	–	4	.417	3	–	11	–	5	.289
Mount St. Mary's ‍‍‍	3	–	6	–	3	.375	6	–	9	–	3	.417
Rider ‍‍‍	3	–	6	–	3	.375	4	–	9	–	4	.353
Marist ‍‍‍	3	–	7	–	2	.333	3	–	11	–	3	.265
Niagara ‍‍‍	1	–	7	–	4	.250	5	–	8	–	4	.412
St. Peter's ‍‍‍	1	–	9	–	2	.167	4	–	11	–	2	.294
† – Conference champion ‡ – 2024 MAAC Tournament champion y – Invited to the NCAA Tournament; As of December 10, 2024; Rankings from United Soccer Coaches Poll; Source:MAAC

2024 Missouri Valley Conference women's soccer standings
	Conf.						Overall
Team	W		L		T	PCT	W		L		T	PCT
Missouri State ‍†‍‡‍^{y}	9	–	0	–	1	.950	13	–	5	–	3	.690
Drake ‍‍‍	6	–	2	–	2	.700	8	–	7	–	6	.524
UIC ‍‍‍	6	–	2	–	2	.700	8	–	10	–	2	.450
Belmont ‍‍‍	5	–	4	–	1	.550	9	–	10	–	2	.476
Indiana State ‍‍‍	4	–	3	–	3	.550	10	–	6	–	5	.595
UNI ‍‍‍	4	–	3	–	3	.550	9	–	6	–	4	.579
Illinois State ‍‍‍	3	–	4	–	3	.450	6	–	9	–	4	.421
Southern Illinois ‍‍‍	2	–	5	–	3	.350	6	–	8	–	5	.447
Evansville ‍‍‍	1	–	4	–	5	.350	2	–	7	–	7	.344
Murray State ‍‍‍	1	–	5	–	4	.300	5	–	8	–	5	.417
Valparaiso ‍‍‍	0	–	9	–	1	.050	4	–	13	–	1	.250
† – Conference champion ‡ – 2024 Missouri Valley Tournament champion y – Invited to the NCAA Tournament; As of December 10, 2024; Rankings from United Soccer Coaches Poll; Source:Missouri Valley Conference

2024 Mountain West Conference women's soccer standings
	Conf.						Overall
Team	W		L		T	PCT	W		L		T	PCT
Boise St ‍†‍‍	8	–	1	–	2	.818	16	–	4	–	2	.773
Utah State ‍‍‡‍^{y}	7	–	1	–	3	.773	18	–	1	–	5	.854
Colorado St ‍‍‍	7	–	1	–	3	.773	12	–	5	–	4	.667
San Diego St ‍‍‍	6	–	2	–	3	.682	9	–	7	–	4	.550
UNLV ‍‍‍	5	–	5	–	1	.500	7	–	11	–	2	.400
Colorado College ‍‍‍	4	–	5	–	2	.455	8	–	9	–	3	.475
Nevada ‍‍‍	4	–	5	–	2	.455	6	–	13	–	2	.333
Wyoming ‍‍‍	2	–	3	–	6	.455	4	–	6	–	9	.447
New Mexico ‍‍‍	3	–	5	–	3	.409	7	–	6	–	5	.528
Fresno St ‍‍‍	2	–	7	–	2	.273	7	–	9	–	3	.447
San Jose St ‍‍‍	1	–	7	–	3	.227	1	–	13	–	5	.184
Air Force ‍‍‍	1	–	8	–	2	.182	5	–	10	–	3	.361
† – Conference champion ‡ – 2024 MW Tournament champion y – Invited to the NCAA Tournament; As of December 10, 2024; Rankings from United Soccer Coaches Poll; Source:Mountain West Conference

2024 Northeast Conference women's soccer standings
	Conf.						Overall
Team	W		L		T	PCT	W		L		T	PCT
Howard ‍†‍‡‍^{y}	8	–	1	–	1	.850	11	–	5	–	5	.643
Wagner ‍‍‍	7	–	1	–	2	.800	8	–	5	–	6	.579
FDU ‍‍‍	7	–	2	–	1	.750	8	–	6	–	6	.550
Stonehill ‍‍‍	7	–	2	–	1	.750	8	–	10	–	1	.447
Central Connecticut ‍‍‍	5	–	4	–	1	.550	5	–	10	–	2	.353
Saint Francis (PA) ‍‍‍	4	–	5	–	1	.450	6	–	9	–	3	.417
LIU ‍‍‍	4	–	5	–	1	.450	5	–	10	–	1	.344
Mercyhurst ‍‍‍	3	–	4	–	3	.450	4	–	11	–	4	.316
Le Moyne ‍‍‍	1	–	7	–	2	.200	2	–	15	–	2	.158
Chicago State ‍‍‍	1	–	7	–	2	.200	1	–	13	–	2	.125
Delaware State ‍‍‍	0	–	9	–	1	.050	0	–	17	–	1	.028
† – Conference champion ‡ – 2024 NEC Tournament champion y – Invited to the NCAA Tournament; As of December 10, 2024; Rankings from United Soccer Coaches Poll; Source:Northeast Conference

2024 Ohio Valley Conference women's soccer standings
	Conf.						Overall
Team	W		L		T	PCT	W		L		T	PCT
Tennessee Tech ‍†‍‍	6	–	2	–	1	.722	6	–	8	–	6	.450
Little Rock ‍‍‍	4	–	1	–	4	.667	7	–	7	–	5	.500
Lindenwood* ‍‍‡‍	4	–	1	–	4	.667	11	–	5	–	4	.650
Southern Indiana ‍‍‍	4	–	2	–	3	.611	5	–	9	–	5	.395
Morehead St. ‍‍‍^{y}	4	–	3	–	2	.556	9	–	8	–	6	.522
Eastern Illinois ‍‍‍	3	–	3	–	3	.500	5	–	8	–	6	.421
SEMO ‍‍‍	2	–	4	–	3	.389	3	–	11	–	3	.265
UT Martin ‍‍‍	3	–	6	–	0	.333	4	–	11	–	3	.306
SIUE ‍‍‍	1	–	3	–	5	.389	2	–	7	–	7	.344
Western Illinois ‍‍‍	1	–	7	–	1	.167	1	–	14	–	1	.094
† – Conference champion ‡ – 2024 OVC Tournament champion y – Invited to the NCAA Tournament * Ineligible for the 2024 NCAA tournament due to transition from Division II. As of December 10, 2024; Rankings from United Soccer Coaches Poll; Source:Ohio Valley Conference Note: Morehead State clinches automatic bid as runner-up in conference tournament because Lindenwood is still in the "period of transition" from Division II to Division I level.

2024 Patriot League women's soccer standings
	Conf.						Overall
Team	W		L		T	PCT	W		L		T	PCT
Bucknell ‍†‍‍	7	–	2	–	0	.778	12	–	4	–	3	.711
Boston U ‍‍‡‍^{y}	5	–	0	–	4	.778	6	–	8	–	7	.452
Army ‍‍‍	5	–	3	–	1	.611	12	–	6	–	1	.658
Loyola (MD) ‍‍‍	3	–	3	–	3	.500	8	–	6	–	5	.553
Colgate ‍‍‍	3	–	3	–	3	.500	5	–	10	–	4	.368
Navy ‍‍‍	3	–	4	–	2	.444	9	–	10	–	2	.476
Lafayette ‍‍‍	2	–	3	–	4	.444	5	–	6	–	4	.467
American ‍‍‍	2	–	5	–	2	.333	6	–	6	–	3	.500
Holy Cross ‍‍‍	2	–	5	–	2	.333	5	–	11	–	2	.333
Lehigh ‍‍‍	2	–	6	–	1	.278	3	–	9	–	5	.324
† – Conference champion ‡ – 2024 Patriot League Tournament champion y – Invited to the NCAA Tournament; As of December 10, 2024; Rankings from United Soccer Coaches Poll; Source:Patriot League

2024 SEC women's soccer standings
	Conf.						Overall
Team	W		L		T	PCT	W		L		T	PCT
No. 10 Mississippi St. ‍†‍‍^{y}	10	–	0	–	0	1.000	19	–	3	–	0	.864
No. 9 Arkansas ‍‍‍^{y}	8	–	1	–	1	.850	16	–	2	–	3	.833
No. 21 Texas ‍‍‡‍^{y}	6	–	3	–	1	.650	17	–	4	–	2	.783
No. 23 South Carolina ‍‍‍^{y}	5	–	2	–	3	.650	11	–	4	–	7	.659
No. 25 Auburn ‍‍‍^{y}	4	–	2	–	4	.600	12	–	4	–	5	.690
No. 15 Vanderbilt ‍‍‍^{y}	4	–	2	–	4	.600	10	–	4	–	7	.643
Georgia ‍‍‍^{y}	3	–	3	–	4	.500	8	–	7	–	6	.524
Kentucky ‍‍‍^{y}	3	–	3	–	4	.500	12	–	5	–	4	.667
Tennessee ‍‍‍^{y}	3	–	4	–	3	.450	9	–	7	–	4	.550
Alabama ‍‍‍	2	–	3	–	5	.450	10	–	6	–	5	.595
LSU ‍‍‍^{y}	3	–	5	–	2	.400	9	–	9	–	3	.500
Texas A&M ‍‍‍	3	–	5	–	2	.400	8	–	9	–	2	.474
Missouri ‍‍‍	3	–	6	–	1	.350	5	–	10	–	2	.353
Oklahoma ‍‍‍	3	–	6	–	1	.350	10	–	7	–	1	.583
Florida ‍‍‍	1	–	7	–	2	.200	4	–	8	–	6	.389
Ole Miss ‍‍‍	0	–	9	–	1	.050	5	–	13	–	1	.289
† – Conference champion ‡ – 2024 SEC Tournament champion y – Invited to the NCAA Tournament; As of December 10, 2024; Rankings from United Soccer Coaches Poll; Source:SEC

2024 Southern Conference women's soccer standings
	Conf.						Overall
Team	W		L		T	PCT	W		L		T	PCT
Western Carolina ‍†‍‍	8	–	0	–	1	.944	15	–	3	–	3	.786
Samford ‍‍‡‍^{y}	6	–	1	–	2	.778	12	–	7	–	3	.614
Mercer ‍‍‍	5	–	2	–	2	.667	11	–	5	–	3	.658
Furman ‍‍‍	5	–	2	–	2	.667	10	–	7	–	3	.575
Chattanooga ‍‍‍	5	–	4	–	0	.556	7	–	9	–	3	.447
UNC Greensboro ‍‍‍	3	–	3	–	3	.500	5	–	9	–	5	.395
ETSU ‍‍‍	3	–	3	–	3	.500	4	–	8	–	4	.375
VMI ‍‍‍	1	–	7	–	1	.167	6	–	11	–	2	.368
Wofford ‍‍‍	1	–	7	–	1	.167	6	–	12	–	2	.350
The Citadel ‍‍‍	0	–	8	–	1	.056	4	–	11	–	3	.306
† – Conference champion ‡ – 2024 SoCON Tournament champion y – Invited to the NCAA Tournament; As of December 10, 2024; Rankings from United Soccer Coaches Poll; Source:SoCon

2024 Southland Conference women's soccer standings
	Conf.						Overall
Team	W		L		T	PCT	W		L		T	PCT
Stephen F. Austin ‍†‍‡‍^{y}	8	–	2	–	0	.800	14	–	4	–	2	.750
Texas A&M–CC ‍‍‍	6	–	2	–	2	.700	10	–	5	–	5	.625
East Texas A&M ‍‍‍	6	–	3	–	1	.650	9	–	10	–	3	.477
Northwestern St ‍‍‍	6	–	3	–	1	.650	11	–	8	–	2	.571
SE Louisiana ‍‍‍	5	–	4	–	1	.550	6	–	9	–	2	.412
Incarnate Word ‍‍‍	5	–	4	–	1	.550	8	–	8	–	3	.500
Lamar ‍‍‍	3	–	3	–	4	.500	5	–	8	–	6	.421
UT Rio Grande Valley ‍‍‍	3	–	3	–	4	.500	7	–	7	–	5	.500
Houston Christian ‍‍‍	3	–	4	–	3	.450	5	–	9	–	5	.395
McNeese ‍‍‍	1	–	8	–	1	.150	4	–	14	–	1	.237
Nicholls ‍‍‍	0	–	10	–	0	.000	2	–	13	–	1	.156
† – Conference champion ‡ – 2024 Southland Tournament champion y – Invited to the NCAA Tournament; As of December 10, 2024; Rankings from United Soccer Coaches Poll; Source:Southland Conference

2024 SWAC women's soccer standings
	Conf.						Overall
Team	W		L		T	PCT	W		L		T	PCT
Texas Southern ‍†‍‍	6	–	1	–	1	.813	8	–	8	–	2	.500
Grambling State ‍‍‍	6	–	2	–	0	.750	9	–	8	–	3	.525
Southern ‍‍‡‍^{y}	5	–	1	–	2	.750	9	–	10	–	2	.476
Alabama A&M ‍‍‍	4	–	3	–	1	.563	7	–	11	–	1	.395
Jackson State ‍‍‍	2	–	2	–	4	.500	2	–	8	–	5	.300
Alabama State ‍‍‍	2	–	3	–	3	.438	5	–	8	–	3	.406
Mississippi Valley State ‍‍‍	1	–	3	–	4	.375	2	–	9	–	4	.267
Prairie View A&M ‍‍‍	0	–	4	–	4	.250	1	–	11	–	4	.188
UAPB ‍‍‍	0	–	7	–	1	.063	1	–	12	–	2	.133
† – Conference champion ‡ – 2024 SWAC Tournament champion y – Invited to the NCAA Tournament; As of December 10, 2024; Rankings from United Soccer Coaches Poll; Source: SWAC

2024 Summit League women's soccer standings
	Conf.						Overall
Team	W		L		T	PCT	W		L		T	PCT
North Dakota State ‍†‍‍	6	–	1	–	1	.813	10	–	5	–	4	.632
Denver ‍‍‍	5	–	1	–	2	.750	11	–	6	–	2	.632
South Dakota State ‍‍‡‍^{y}	5	–	2	–	1	.688	15	–	5	–	2	.727
Omaha ‍‍‍	4	–	1	–	3	.688	10	–	3	–	5	.694
Oral Roberts ‍‍‍	3	–	2	–	3	.563	9	–	8	–	5	.523
South Dakota ‍‍‍	1	–	3	–	4	.375	3	–	9	–	6	.333
St. Thomas* ‍‍‍	1	–	5	–	2	.250	5	–	9	–	3	.382
North Dakota ‍‍‍	0	–	4	–	4	.250	4	–	8	–	6	.389
Kansas City ‍‍‍	1	–	7	–	0	.125	7	–	8	–	3	.472
† – Conference champion ‡ – Summit League tournament champion y – Invited to the NCAA tournament * Ineligible for the 2024 NCAA tournament due to transition from Division III; As of December 10, 2024; Rankings from United Soccer Coaches Poll; Source: Summit League

2024 Sun Belt Conference women's soccer standings
	Conf.						Overall
Team	W		L		T	PCT	W		L		T	PCT
East
James Madison ‍†‍‡‍^{y}	8	–	0	–	2	.900	12	–	4	–	5	.690
Old Dominion ‍‍‍	5	–	2	–	3	.650	10	–	6	–	4	.600
Georgia State ‍‍‍	4	–	2	–	4	.600	5	–	7	–	7	.447
Appalachian State ‍‍‍	4	–	3	–	3	.550	7	–	7	–	5	.500
Coastal Carolina ‍‍‍	3	–	3	–	4	.500	8	–	7	–	6	.524
Georgia Southern ‍‍‍	3	–	6	–	1	.350	6	–	11	–	2	.368
Marshall ‍‍‍	1	–	5	–	4	.300	3	–	8	–	5	.344
West
Texas State ‍‍‍	6	–	1	–	3	.750	12	–	5	–	5	.659
South Alabama ‍‍‍	5	–	2	–	3	.650	10	–	6	–	3	.605
UL Monroe ‍‍‍	3	–	5	–	2	.400	9	–	8	–	3	.525
Southern Miss ‍‍‍	2	–	3	–	5	.450	3	–	7	–	5	.367
Louisiana ‍‍‍	2	–	4	–	4	.400	7	–	5	–	8	.550
Arkansas State ‍‍‍	1	–	5	–	4	.300	4	–	6	–	6	.438
Troy ‍‍‍	1	–	7	–	2	.200	5	–	9	–	3	.382
† – Conference champion ‡ – 2024 Sun Belt Tournament champion y – Invited to the NCAA Tournament; As of December 10, 2024; Rankings from United Soccer Coaches Poll; Source:Sun Belt

2024 West Coast Conference women's soccer standings
	Conf.						Overall
Team	W		L		T	PCT	W		L		T	PCT
No. 20 Santa Clara ‍†‍‍^{y}	6	–	1	–	3	.750	13	–	4	–	4	.714
Pepperdine ‍†‍‍^{y}	6	–	1	–	3	.750	12	–	4	–	5	.690
Gonzaga ‍‍‍	6	–	3	–	1	.650	10	–	7	–	2	.579
Washington State ‍‍‍	5	–	2	–	3	.650	8	–	5	–	6	.579
Loyola Marymount ‍‍‍	5	–	3	–	2	.600	11	–	5	–	2	.667
Oregon State ‍‍‍	5	–	3	–	2	.600	7	–	9	–	2	.444
Portland ‍‍‍	4	–	3	–	3	.550	9	–	5	–	6	.600
Saint Mary's ‍‍‍	4	–	3	–	3	.550	7	–	7	–	4	.500
San Francisco ‍‍‍	1	–	7	–	2	.200	5	–	11	–	2	.333
San Diego ‍‍‍	1	–	7	–	2	.200	3	–	11	–	5	.289
Pacific ‍‍‍	0	–	10	–	0	.000	2	–	17	–	1	.125
† – Conference champion y – Invited to the NCAA Tournament; As of December 10, 2024; Rankings from United Soccer Coaches Poll; Source:West Coast Conference

2024 WAC women's soccer standings
	Conf.						Overall
Team	W		L		T	PCT	W		L		T	PCT
Utah Valley ‍†‍‍	6	–	0	–	1	.929	12	–	5	–	2	.684
Grand Canyon ‍‍‍	5	–	1	–	1	.786	11	–	6	–	3	.625
Seattle ‍‍‍	4	–	1	–	2	.714	10	–	3	–	6	.684
California Baptist ‍‍‡‍^{y}	3	–	3	–	1	.500	10	–	7	–	3	.575
Tarleton State ‍‍‍	3	–	4	–	0	.429	9	–	8	–	3	.525
Utah Tech ‍‍‍	2	–	4	–	1	.357	5	–	7	–	5	.441
Abilene Christian ‍‍‍	0	–	5	–	2	.143	2	–	7	–	8	.353
Southern Utah ‍‍‍	0	–	5	–	2	.143	2	–	10	–	5	.265
† – Conference champion ‡ – 2024 WAC Tournament champion y – Invited to the NCAA Tournament; As of December 10, 2024; Rankings from United Soccer Coaches Poll; Source:WAC

2024 NCAA Division I independents women's soccer records
	Conf.						Overall
Team	W		L		T	PCT	W		L		T	PCT
South Carolina State ‍‍‍	0	–	0	–	0	–	1	–	15	–	0	.063
y – Invited to the NCAA Tournament; As of December 10, 2024; Rankings from United Soccer Coaches Poll

=== Conference winners and tournaments ===
Conference	Regular Season Champion(s)	Tournament Winner	Conference Tournament	Tournament Dates	Tournament Venue (City)
American	Memphis	East Carolina	2024 Tournament	November 4 – 10	Premier Sports Campus • Lakewood Ranch, Florida
America East	Maine		2024 Tournament	November 3 – 10	Campus sites, hosted by higher seed
ACC	Duke	Florida State	2024 Tournament	November 3 – 10	First Round: Campus sites, hosted by higher seeds Semifinals and final: WakeMed Soccer Park • Cary, North Carolina
Atlantic 10	Saint Louis		2024 Tournament	November 1 – 10	Campus sites, hosted by higher seed
ASUN	Florida Gulf Coast	Lipscomb	2024 Tournament	October 31 – November 10	Campus sites, hosted by higher seed
Big East	Georgetown	Connecticut	2024 Tournament	November 3 – 10	Quarterfinals: Campus sites, hosted by higher seed Semifinals and final: Maryland SoccerPlex • Boyds, Maryland
Big Sky	Montana	Sacramento State	2024 Tournament	November 6 – 10	South Campus Stadium • Missoula, Montana
Big South	USC Upstate		2024 Tournament	November 2 – 10	Quarterfinals: Campus sites, hosted by higher seed Semifinals and final: Sportsplex at Matthews • Matthews, North Carolina
Big Ten	USC	UCLA	2024 Tournament	October 31 – November 10	First Round: Elizabeth Lyle Robbie Stadium • Minneapolis, Minnesota; Semifinals and final: Energizer Park • St. Louis, Missouri
Big 12	TCU	Kansas	2024 Tournament	October 30 – November 9	CPKC Stadium • Kansas City, Missouri
Big West	Hawaii	UC Santa Barbara	2024 Tournament	November 3 – 10	Quarterfinals: Campus sites, hosted by higher seed Semifinals and final: Waipiʻo Peninsula Soccer Stadium • Waipahu, Hawaii
CAA	Monmouth (Note: Top seed in conference tournament.); Stony Brook	Stony Brook	2024 Tournament	October 31 – November 9	Quarterfinals and semifinals: Campus sites, hosted by top two seeds Final: Hosted by top remaining seed
CUSA	FIU; Liberty	FIU	2024 Tournament	November 6 – 10	FIU Soccer Stadium • Westchester, Florida
Horizon	Milwaukee		2024 Tournament	November 3 – 9	Quarterfinals: Campus sites, hosted by higher seed Semifinals and final: Hosted by regular-season champion
Ivy	Princeton		2024 Tournament	November 8 – 10	Roberts Stadium • Princeton, New Jersey
MAAC	Fairfield		2024 Tournament	November 3 – 10	Campus sites, hosted by higher seed
MAC	Western Michigan		2024 Tournament	November 3 – 10	Quarterfinals: Campus sites, hosted by higher seed Semifinals and final: WMU Soccer Complex • Kalamazoo, Michigan
Missouri Valley	Missouri State		2024 Tournament	October 31 – November 10	First Round and Quarterfinals: Campus sites, hosted by higher seed Semifinals and Final: Hosted by #1 seed
Mountain West	Boise State	Utah State	2024 Tournament	November 3 – 9	SDSU Sports Deck • San Diego, California
Northeast	Howard		2024 Tournament	November 7 – 10	Campus sites, hosted by higher seed
Ohio Valley	Tennessee Tech	Lindenwood (Note: Lindenwood wins the conference tournament but Morehead State clinches the automatic bid because Lindenwood remains in the reclassification transition process from Division II to Division I. Eligibility for Lindenwood to earn automatic bids to NCAA Championships begins in 2026-27, its first full season of full Division I membership.) (winner, not eligible) Morehead State (runner-up, earns auto-bid)	2024 Tournament	October 31 – November 10	First Round and Quarterfinals: Campus sites, hosted by #3 and #4 seeds Semifinals and Final: Hosted by #1 seed
Patriot	Bucknell	Boston	2024 Tournament	November 3 – 10	Campus sites, hosted by higher seed
SEC	Mississippi State	Texas	2024 Tournament	November 3 – 10	Ashton Brosnaham Soccer Complex • Pensacola, Florida
SoCon	Western Carolina	Samford	2024 Tournament	October 29 – November 10	Campus sites, hosted by higher seed
Southland	Stephen F. Austin		2024 Tournament	November 5 – 10	Dr. Jack Dugan Soccer and Track & Field Stadium • Corpus Christi, Texas
SWAC	Texas Southern	Southern	2024 Tournament	November 7 – 10	PVAMU Soccer Complex • Prairie View, Texas
Summit	North Dakota State	South Dakota State	2024 Tournament	November 1 – 10	Quarterfinals: Campus sites, hosted by higher seeds Semifinals and Final: Campus sites, hosted by #1 seed
Sun Belt	James Madison		2024 Tournament	November 4 – 9	Foley Sports Tourism Complex • Foley, Alabama
WAC	Utah Valley	California Baptist	2024 Tournament	November 3 – 9	Elmer Gray Stadium • Abilene, Texas
WCC	Santa Clara (Note: Santa Clara earns automatic bid to NCAA Tournament due to tiebreaker of having a better goal differential in conference play.); Pepperdine	No Tournament			

== Postseason ==
=== Final rankings ===
Rank	United Soccer Coaches	TopDrawerSoccer.com
1	North Carolina	
2	Wake Forest	
3	Duke	
4	Stanford	
5	USC	
6	Notre Dame	Penn State
7	Virginia Tech	Notre Dame
8	Penn State	Virginia Tech
9	Arkansas	Mississippi State
10	Mississippi State	Arkansas
11	Ohio State	
12	Iowa	Michigan State
13	Florida State	Minnesota
14	Michigan State	Iowa
15	Vanderbilt	
16	TCU	Wisconsin
17	Minnesota	Florida State
18	UCLA	
19	Wisconsin	Texas
20	Santa Clara	TCU
21	Texas	South Carolina
22	Saint Louis	
23	South Carolina	Georgetown
24	Texas Tech	
25	Auburn	Connecticut

== Award winners ==
=== All-America teams ===
2024 United Soccer Coaches All-America Teams
First Team	Second Team	Third Team	Fourth Team
Leah Freeman, GK, Duke; Macy Blackburn, DF, Texas Tech; Brooklyn Courtnall, DF, USC; Lilly Reale, DF, UCLA; Maggie Graham, MF, Duke; Macey Hodge, MF, Mississippi State; Helena Sampaio, MF, USC; Kailyn Dudukovich, FW, Ohio State; Kate Faasse, FW, North Carolina; Caiya Hanks, FW, Wake Forest; Ava Tankersley, FW, Arkansas	Maddy Anderson, GK, Mississippi State; Trinity Armstrong, DF, Texas; Natalie Bain, DF, Xavier; Cameron Roller, DF, Duke; Hannah Bebar, MF, Duke; Anna Haddock, MF, Auburn; Lexi Missimo, MF, Texas; Samantha Wiehe, MF, Xavier; Bella Diorio, FW, TCU; Jordynn Dudley, FW, Florida State; Izzy Engle, FW, Notre Dame; Khyah Harper, FW, Minnesota	Jordan Nytes, GK, Colorado; Rylie Combs, DF, Mississippi State; Ashlynn Kulha, DF, Old Dominion; Lawson Renie, DF, Georgetown; Abi Brighton, MF, Vanderbilt; Emily Colton, MF, Wake Forest; Justina Gaynor, MF, Michigan State; Catherine Barry, FW, South Carolina; Maile Hayes, FW, USC; Abby Kraemer, FW, Maine; Ginny Lackey, FW, James Madison; Chioma Okafor, FW, Connecticut	Ryan Campbell, GK, ULCA; Zara Chavoshi, DF, Wake Forest; Heather Gilchrist, DF, Florida State; Zara Siassi, DF, North Florida; Mia Bhuta, MF, Stanford; Irene Campos, MF, South Alabama; Tessa Dellarose, MF, North Carolina; Eliza Turner, MF, Georgetown; Seven Castain, FW, TCU; Kaitlyn MacBean, FW, Penn State; Gianna Paul, FW, Alabama; Kiara Pralle, FW, Lipscomb

=== Major player of the year awards ===
- Hermann Trophy: Kate Faasse
- TopDrawerSoccer.com National Player of the Year Award: Kate Faasse

=== Other major awards ===
- United Soccer Coaches College Coach of the Year: Damon Nahas, North Carolina
- Bill Jeffrey Award: Bob Warming
- Jerry Yeagley Award: Christine Roehling
- Mike Berticelli Award: Erik Oman
- NCAA Tournament MVP: Offensive: Olivia Thomas; Defensive: Clare Gagne

== See also ==
- College soccer
- List of NCAA Division I women's soccer programs
- 2024 in American soccer
- 2024 NCAA Division I women's soccer tournament
- 2024 NCAA Division I men's soccer season
