= 2024 North Dakota State Bison women's soccer team =

American college women's soccer season

2024 North Dakota State Bison women's soccer

Summit League Regular Season Champion
- Conference: Summit League
- Record: 10–5–4 (6–1–1 Summit)
- Head coach: Mike Regan
- Home stadium: Dacotah Field

2024 Summit League women's soccer standings
	Conf.						Overall
Team	W		L		T	PCT	W		L		T	PCT
North Dakota State ‍†‍‍	6	–	1	–	1	.813	10	–	5	–	4	.632
Denver ‍‍‍	5	–	1	–	2	.750	11	–	6	–	2	.632
South Dakota State ‍‍‡‍^{y}	5	–	2	–	1	.688	15	–	5	–	2	.727
Omaha ‍‍‍	4	–	1	–	3	.688	10	–	3	–	5	.694
Oral Roberts ‍‍‍	3	–	2	–	3	.563	9	–	8	–	5	.523
South Dakota ‍‍‍	1	–	3	–	4	.375	3	–	9	–	6	.333
St. Thomas* ‍‍‍	1	–	5	–	2	.250	5	–	9	–	3	.382
North Dakota ‍‍‍	0	–	4	–	4	.250	4	–	8	–	6	.389
Kansas City ‍‍‍	1	–	7	–	0	.125	7	–	8	–	3	.472
† – Conference champion ‡ – Summit League tournament champion y – Invited to the NCAA tournament * Ineligible for the 2024 NCAA tournament due to transition from Division III; As of December 10, 2024; Rankings from United Soccer Coaches Poll; Source: Summit League

The 2024 North Dakota State Bison women's soccer team represented North Dakota State University during the 2024 NCAA Division I women's soccer season. The Bison were led by seventh-year head coach Mike Regan, and played home games at Dacotah Field in Fargo, North Dakota.
The Bison finished the season with a 10–6–3, 6–1–1 Summit League record that was good for number 1 in the conference. They entered the 2024 Summit League women's soccer tournament as the top seed and hosted the semifinals and final game. NDSU's season would come to an end in the first game they played, in the semifinals, in penalties against Oral Roberts.

== Previous season ==
The Bison finished the 2023 season with a 1–3–4 record in Summit League play, and a 5–6–6 record overall. NDSU finished the season seventh in the conference and did not play in the Summit League tournament.

== Team Personnel ==
=== Roster ===
Note: Flags indicate national team as defined under FIFA eligibility rules; some limited exceptions apply. Players may hold more than one non-FIFA nationality.

No.	Pos.	Nation	Player
0	GK	USA	Payton Mulberry (Junior)
00	GK	USA	Hannah Stipp (Sophomore)
3	FW	USA	Ava Stanchina (Sophomore)
4	MF	CAN	Devon Kavanagh (Junior)
5	DF	USA	Kaitlyn Hanson (Senior)
7	DF	USA	Cadence Kline (Junior)
9	MF	USA	Elana Webber (Senior)
11	MF	USA	Olivia Watson (Senior)
12	DF	USA	Izzy Smith (Junior)
13	FW	USA	Madalyn Grate (Senior)

No.	Pos.	Nation	Player
17	FW	USA	Gabrielle Garrett (Sophomore)
19	DF/MF	USA	Ellie Sanchez (Sophomore)
20	DF/MF	USA	Amaya Garrett (Sophomore)
22	DF	USA	Tyreese Zacher (Sophomore)
23	DF	USA	Jess Hanley (Senior)
24	MF	USA	Loretta Wacek (Senior)
25	FW	USA	Olivia Lovick (Senior)
27	MF	USA	Alicia Nead (Senior)
28	FW	USA	Sidney Armstrong (Sophomore)
30	MF	USA	Hannah Arnold (Sophomore)

=== Coaching staff ===
Position	Staff
Head coach	Mike Regan
Associate Head Coach	Chris Higgins
Assistant Coach	Ashley St. Aubin

== Schedule ==
Date Time, TV	Rank^{#}	Opponent^{#}	Result	Record	Site (Attendance) City, State
Exhibition
August 7*; 6:00 p.m.		Dakota Wesleyan	W 12–0	–	Dacotah Field; Fargo, ND
August 10*; 2:00 p.m.		vs. Drake	L 2–3	–	Academy of Holy Angels Soccer Field; Richfield, MN
Non-conference Regular Season
August 15*; 1:00 p.m.		at Viterbo	W 3–1	1–0–0	Outdoor Athletics Complex (123); La Crosse, WI
August 18*; 1:00 p.m., ESPN+		at Green Bay	T 0–0	1–0–1	Festival Foods Field at Aldo Santaga Stadium (374); Green Bay, WI
August 22*; 6:00 p.m., WDAY Xtra/SLN		Alabama State	W 3–0	2–0–1	Dacotah Field (203); Fargo, ND
August 27*; 12:00 a.m.		at Hawaii Pacific	W 1–0	3–0–1	Waipiʻo Peninsula Soccer Stadium (155); Waipahu, HI
August 29*; 9:30 p.m.		vs. Grand Canyon	L 0–1	3–1–1	Waipi'o Peninsula Soccer Stadium (210); Waipahu, HI
September 1*; 9:00 p.m.		at Hawaii	L 1–4	3–2–1	Waipi'o Peninsula Soccer Stadium (726); Waipahu, HI
September 8*; 1:00 p.m., WDAY Xtra/SLN		Idaho State	T 0–0	3–2–2	Dacotah Field (253); Fargo, ND
September 12*; 6:00 p.m., SLN		Weber State	L 2–4	3–3–2	Dacotah Field (192); Fargo, ND
September 15*; 1:00 p.m.		at Minnesota	L 0–1	3–4–2	Elizabeth Lyle Robbie Stadium (1,387); Minneapolis, MN
September 20*; 6:00 p.m., SLN		St. Ambrose	W 5–0	4–4–2	Dacotah Field (376); Fargo, ND
Summit League Regular Season
September 26; 7:00 p.m., SLN		at Omaha	T 1–1	4–4–3 (0–0–1)	Al F. Caniglia Field (316); Omaha, NE
September 29; 1:00 p.m., SLN		at Kansas City	W 1–0	5–4–3 (1–0–1)	Durwood Soccer Stadium (266); Kansas City, MO
October 6; 1:00 p.m., SLN		at North Dakota	W 2–1	6–4–3 (2–0–1)	Bronson Field (207); Grand Forks, ND
October 10; 6:00 p.m., SLN		Oral Roberts	W 2–1	7–4–3 (3–0–1)	Dacotah Field (203); Fargo, ND
October 13; 1:00 p.m., SLN		at Denver	L 1–2	7–5–3 (3–1–1)	CIBER Field (590); Denver, CO
October 17; 6:00 p.m., SLN		South Dakota State	W 1–0	8–5–3 (4–1–1)	Dacotah Field (323); Fargo, ND
October 20; 1:00 p.m., WDAY Xtra/SLN		South Dakota	W 4–2	9–5–3 (5–1–1)	Dacotah Field (254); Fargo, ND
October 27; 1:00 p.m., SLN		St. Thomas	W 2–1	10–5–3 (6–1–1)	Dacotah Field (405); Fargo, ND
Summit League tournament
November 7, 2024*; 3:30 p.m., SLN	(1)	(5) Oral Roberts; Semifinals	T 0–0 (3–5) ^{PKs}	10–5–4	Dacotah Field (396); Fargo, ND
*Non-conference game. ^{#}Rankings from United Soccer Coaches. (#) Tournament seedings in parentheses. All times are in CDT.
