= 2024 Big West Conference women's soccer tournament =

- Classification: Division I
- Teams: 6
- Matches: 5
- Attendance: 2,198
- Site: Waipiʻo Peninsula Soccer Stadium (Semifinals & Final); Waipahu, Hawaii
- Champions: UC Santa Barbara (3rd title)
- Winning coach: Paul Stumpf (3rd title)
- MVP: Devin Greer; Sofie Rodriguez (UC Santa Barbara)
- Broadcast: ESPN+

2024 Big West Conference women's soccer standings
	Conf.						Overall
Team	W		L		T	PCT	W		L		T	PCT
Hawaii ‍†‍‍	8	–	1	–	1	.850	12	–	8	–	1	.595
UC Davis ‍‍‍	6	–	2	–	2	.700	13	–	5	–	2	.700
UC Santa Barbara ‍‍‡‍^{y}	4	–	2	–	4	.600	8	–	6	–	9	.543
UC Irvine ‍‍‍	4	–	2	–	4	.600	6	–	7	–	6	.474
Cal State Bakersfield ‍‍‍	4	–	3	–	3	.550	8	–	10	–	5	.457
Cal State Fullerton ‍‍‍	4	–	3	–	3	.550	6	–	10	–	4	.400
Cal State Northridge ‍‍‍	3	–	4	–	3	.450	5	–	11	–	3	.342
Long Beach St ‍‍‍	3	–	5	–	2	.400	6	–	9	–	3	.417
Cal Poly ‍‍‍	3	–	6	–	1	.350	5	–	11	–	3	.342
UC San Diego ‍‍‍	1	–	6	–	3	.250	3	–	12	–	4	.263
UC Riverside ‍‍‍	0	–	6	–	4	.200	2	–	13	–	4	.211
† – Conference champion ‡ – 2024 Big West Tournament champion y – Invited to the NCAA Tournament; As of December 10, 2024; Rankings from United Soccer Coaches Poll; Source:The Big West Conference

The 2024 Big West Conference women's soccer tournament was the postseason women's soccer tournament for the Big West Conference held from November 3 to November 10, 2024. The Semifinals and Final of the five-match tournament took place at Waipiʻo Peninsula Soccer Stadium in Waipahu, Hawaii and on the campus of the higher seed hosted First Round games. The six-team single-elimination tournament consisted of three rounds based on seeding from regular season conference play. The defending champions were the UC Irvine Anteaters. The Anteaters were unable to defend their title as they fell in the First Round to Cal State Bakersfield. Third seed UC Santa Barbara went on to win the title in a penalty shoot-out over Cal State Bakersfield in the Final. This was the third Big West tournament title for the UC Santa Barbara program and the third for head coach Paul Stumpf. As tournament champions, UC Santa Barbara earned the Big West's automatic berth into the 2024 NCAA Division I women's soccer tournament.

== Seeding ==
The top six teams in the regular season earned a spot in the tournament and teams were seeded by regular season conference record. A tiebreaker was required to determine the third and fourth seeds as UC Irvine and UC Santa Barbara both finished with 4–2–4 regular season records. UC Santa Barbara earned the third seed by virtue of their 1–0 regular season win over UC Irvine on October 6. A second tiebreaker was required for the fifth and sixth seeds as Cal State Bakersfield and Cal State Fullerton both finished with 4–3–3 regular season records. The two teams tied on the final day of the regular season 1–1. The second tiebreaker was goal differential in conference play, where the two teams tied again. The two teams also tied the third tiebreaker, goals scored in conference play. The tie was finally broke on the fourth tiebreaker which was goals scored overall. Cal State Bakersfield won this tiebreaker 23 to 22 and earned the fifth seed.

Seed	School	Conference Record	Points
1	Hawaii	8–1–1	25
2	UC Davis	6–2–2	20
3	UC Santa Barbara	4–2–4	16
4	UC Irvine	4–2–4	16
5	Cal State Bakersfield	4–3–3	15
6	Cal State Fullerton	4–3–3	15

== Bracket ==
First round Sunday, Nov. 3
4	UC Irvine	0
5	Cal State Bakersfield	1
3	UC Santa Barbara	2
6	Cal State Fullerton	1

Semifinals; Thursday, Nov. 7
1	Hawaii	0
5	Cal State Bakersfield	3
2	UC Davis	2
3	UC Santa Barbara (a.e.t.)	3

Final; Sunday, Nov. 10
5	Cal State Bakersfield	2 (7)
3	UC Santa Barbara (pen.)	2 (8)

== Schedule ==
=== Quarterfinals ===
November 3, 2024	#3 UC Santa Barbara	2–1	#6 Cal State Fullerton	Santa Barbara, CA
12:00 p.m. PST	Olivia Howard 66'; Devin Greer 74'	Report	66' (pen.) Kaylin Raibon	Stadium: Harder Stadium; Attendance: 427; Referee: Kristin Patterson; Assistant referees: Amanda Dibiasio; Jaclyn Reilman; Fourth official: Pamela Gonzalez

November 3, 2024	#4 UC Irvine	0–1	#5 Cal State Bakersfield	Irvine, CA
6:00 p.m. PST	Chloe Ragon (yellow card) 73'	Report	(yellow card) 28' Iliana Murguia; 44' Isis Salazar-Ortega; (yellow card) 66' Josie Novak; (yellow card) 86' Cynthia Ramirez	Stadium: Anteater Stadium; Attendance: 455; Referee: Sean Wright; Assistant referees: Cesar Calderon; Haily Morejon; Fourth official: Matthew Tanious

=== Semifinals ===
November 6, 2024	#2 UC Davis	2–3 (a.e.t.)	#3 UC Santa Barbara	Waipahu, HI
6:00 p.m. PST	Teresa Garcia 74'; Ashleigh Garcia 76'	Report	48' Haley Phillips; 58' O'Callaghan Liu; (yellow card) 74' Team; 110' (pen.) Devin Greer	Stadium: Waipiʻo Peninsula Soccer Stadium; Attendance: 334; Referee: Eric Ehrhardt; Assistant referees: Brandon Rivera; Mike Hanna; Fourth official: Isaiah Takahashi

November 6, 2024	#1 Hawaii	0–3	#5 Cal State Bakersfield	Waipahu, HI
9:00 p.m. PST	Jacey Jicha (yellow card) 21'; Piper Bertani (yellow card) 87'	Report	26' (pen.) Anela Nigito; (yellow card) 52' Paige Rodriguez; 63' Cynthia Ramirez; 66' Megan Ormson	Stadium: Waipiʻo Peninsula Soccer Stadium; Attendance: 662; Referee: Adrian Gonzalez; Assistant referees: Isaiah Takahashi; Cassidy Dixon; Fourth official: Brandon Rivera

=== Final ===
November 10, 2024	#3 UC Santa Barbara	2–2 (a.e.t.) (8–7 p)	#5 Cal State Bakersfield	Waipahu, HI
1:00 p.m. PST	Devin Greer 36', 51'; Chayse Yu (yellow card) 39'; Sofie Rodriguez (yellow card) 56'; Haley Phillips (yellow card) 65'	Report	4' Cynthia Ramirez; 65' Isis Salazar-Ortega	Stadium: Waipiʻo Peninsula Soccer Stadium; Attendance: 320; Referee: Ivan De Cristofaro; Assistant referees: Andie Reyes; Kristin Patterson; Fourth official: Jaymie Barnes
	Penalties
	Devin Greer (penalty scored); Emily Caughey (penalty scored); Emma Corcoran (penalty missed); Sofie Rodriguez (penalty scored); O'Callaghan Liu (penalty scored); Caitlyn Simons (penalty scored); Olivia Howard (penalty scored); Isabella Ong (penalty scored); Haley Phillips (penalty scored)		(penalty scored) Anela Nigito; (penalty scored) Mya Fortun; (penalty scored) Sara Ybarra; (penalty scored) Cynthia Ramirez; (penalty missed) Iliana Murguia; (penalty scored) Isis Salazar-Ortega; (penalty scored) Miah Thomas; (penalty scored) Natalie O'Sullivan; (penalty missed) Hollee Hercik

== Statistics ==
=== Goalscorers ===
There were 16 goals scored in 5 matches, for an average of 3.2 goals per match (as of November 10, 2024).

4 goals

- Devin Greer – UC Santa Barbara

2 goals

- Cynthia Ramirez – Cal State Bakersfield
- Isis Salazar-Ortega – Cal State Bakersfield

1 goal

- Teresa Garcia – UC Davis
- Ashleigh Garcia – UC Davis
- Olivia Howard – UC Santa Barbara
- O'Callaghan Liu – UC Santa Barbara
- Anela Nigito – Cal State Bakersfield
- Megan Ormson – Cal State Bakersfield
- Haley Phillips – UC Santa Barbara
- Kaylin Raibon – Cal State Fullerton
