= 2024 Big South Conference women's soccer tournament =

- Classification: Division I
- Teams: 6
- Matches: 5
- Attendance: 1,482
- First round site: Longwood Athletics Complex; Patrick D. Cupp Stadium; Farmville, Virginia; Radford, Virginia
- Semifinals site: Sportsplex at Matthews; Matthews, North Carolina
- Finals site: Sportsplex at Matthews; Matthews, North Carolina
- Champions: USC Upstate (1st title)
- Winning coach: Sharif Saber (1st title)
- MVP: Catarina Dantas (USC Upstate)
- Broadcast: ESPN+

2024 Big South Conference women's soccer standings
	Conf.						Overall
Team	W		L		T	PCT	W		L		T	PCT
USC Upstate (2.13) ‍†‍‡‍^{y}	5	–	1	–	2	.750	10	–	5	–	4	.632
High Point (2.00) ‍‍‍	5	–	2	–	1	.688	9	–	7	–	3	.553
Radford (1.71) ‍‍‍	3	–	1	–	3	.643	9	–	4	–	5	.639
Longwood (1.50) ‍‍‍	3	–	2	–	3	.563	4	–	9	–	6	.368
Presbyterian (1.29) ‍‍‍	2	–	2	–	3	.500	7	–	6	–	5	.528
UNC Asheville (1.00) ‍‍‍	2	–	4	–	0	.333	4	–	12	–	1	.265
Charleston Southern (1.00) ‍‍‍	2	–	4	–	1	.357	5	–	7	–	3	.433
Gardner-Webb (0.75) ‍‍‍	1	–	4	–	3	.313	4	–	11	–	4	.316
Winthrop (0.57) ‍‍‍	0	–	3	–	4	.286	3	–	7	–	4	.357
† – Conference champion ‡ – 2024 Big South Tournament champion y – Invited to the NCAA Tournament; As of December 10, 2024; Rankings from United Soccer Coaches Poll; Source:Big South Conference Note:Due to three matches unable to be re-scheduled due to the aftermath of Hurricane Helene, the Big South’s “Unequal Games Played” policy takes effect, which uses an average points per game system for league wins/ties to determine official standings order. Each team's point average is listed in parentheses.

The 2024 Big South Conference women's soccer tournament was the postseason women's soccer tournament for the Big South Conference held from November 2 through November 10, 2024. The tournament was hosted by campus sites for the First Round and by the Sportsplex at Matthews in Matthews, North Carolina, for the Semifinals and Final. The six team-team single-elimination tournament consisted of three rounds based on seeding from regular season conference play. Radford were the defending champions, and they were the third seed in the 2024 tournament. They were not successful in defending their title as they fell to High Point in overtime, in the Semifinals. USC Upstate would go on to defeat High Point in the Final 3–0 to win the tournament title. The conference tournament title was the first for the USC Upstate women's soccer program, and first for head coach Sharif Saber. As tournament champions, USC Upstate earned the Big South's automatic berth into the 2024 NCAA Division I women's soccer tournament.

== Seeding ==
The top six teams in the regular season earned a spot in the tournament. The top two seeds earned byes into the Semifinals, and the third and fourth seeds earned the right to host a First Round match. Due to three matches unable to be rescheduled due to the aftermath of Hurricane Helene, the Big South's “Unequal Games Played” policy takes effect, which uses an average points per game system for league wins/ties to determine official standings order. A tiebreaker was required between Charleston Southern and UNC Asheville, as both teams finished with 1.00 points per game in the regular season. UNC Asheville qualified for the tournament as the sixth seed by virtue of their 1–0 regular season win over Charleston Southern. Charleston Southern finished seventh and did not qualify for the tournament.

Seed	School	Conference Record	Points	Points per Match
1	USC Upstate	5–1–2	17	2.13
2	High Point	5–2–1	16	2.00
3	Radford	3–1–3	12	1.71
4	Longwood	3–2–3	12	1.50
5	Presbyterian	2–2–3	9	1.29
6	UNC Asheville	2–4–0	6	1.00

== Bracket ==
First round Saturday, Nov. 2
4	Longwood	0 (2)
5	Presbyterian (pen.)	0 (4)
3	Radford	3
6	UNC Asheville	0

Semifinals; Thursday, Nov. 7
1	USC Upstate	2
5	Presbyterian	1
2	High Point (a.e.t.)	3
3	Radford	2

Final; Sunday, Nov. 10
1	USC Upstate	3
2	High Point	0

== Schedule ==
=== First Round ===
November 2, 2024	#3 Radford	3–0	#6 UNC Asheville	Radford, VA
7:00 p.m. ET	UNC Asheville Own Goal 15'; Lilly Short 25'; Kayla Edwards (yellow card) 51'; Caitlyn Nottingham 68'	Report	(yellow card) 28' Nao Nawasaki	Stadium: Patrick D. Cupp Stadium; Attendance: 541; Referee: Robert Dail; Assistant referees: Derek Guerrier; James Scott; Fourth official: Kevin Maurer

November 2, 2024	#4 Longwood	0–0 (a.e.t.) (2–4 p)	#5 Presbyterian	Farmville, VA
7:00 p.m. ET		Report		Stadium: Longwood Athletics Complex; Attendance: 513; Referee: Jude Carr; Assistant referees: R. Patrick Stephan; Marcus Moss; Fourth official: Luis Tamayo
	Penalties
	Catharine Forst (penalty missed); Karleigh Minson (penalty missed); Emma Jones (penalty scored); Sydney Robertson (penalty scored)		(penalty scored) Sarah Dieffenderfer; (penalty scored) Harlan Lyons; (penalty missed) Lindsey Malyszek; (penalty scored) Lyla Chadd; (penalty scored) Kelly Hall

=== Semifinals ===
November 7, 2024	#1 USC Upstate	2–1	#5 Presbyterian	Matthews, NC
4:00 p.m. ET	Paige Armstrong 81'; Dara Russo 87'	Report	85' Sloan Spees	Stadium: Sportsplex at Matthews; Attendance: 1 Referee: Kevin Maurer; Assistant referees: Tyler Bost; Tarver Pyke; Fourth official: Khadime Sabara

November 7, 2024	#2 High Point	3–2 (a.e.t.)	#3 Radford	Matthews, NC
7:00 p.m. ET	Peyton Gilmore 37'; Ella Vaughn 90'; Megan Garmey 94'	Report	61' Lilly Short; 90' High Point Own Goal	Stadium: Sportsplex at Matthews; Attendance: 1 Referee: Michael Lavergne; Assistant referees: Thomas Rutherford; Richard Wells; Fourth official: Khadime Sabara

=== Final ===
November 10, 2024	#1 USC Upstate	3–0	#2 High Point	Matthews, NC
1:00 p.m. ET	Dara Russo 23'; Morgan de Barros (yellow card) 54'; Paige Armstrong 58'; Savannah Noll 77'	Report	(yellow card) 79' Peyton Gilmore; (yellow card) 90' Alex DePerno	Stadium: Sportsplex at Matthews; Attendance: 426; Referee: Rick Rogers; Assistant referees: Benjamin Oakley; Raymond Thomas; Fourth official: Aaron Hormuth

== Statistics ==
=== Goalscorers ===
There were 14 goals scored in 5 matches, for an average of 2.8 goals per match (as of November 10, 2024).

2 goals

- Paige Armstrong – USC Upstate
- Dara Russo – USC Upstate
- Lilly Short – Radford

1 goal

- Megan Garmey – High Point
- Peyton Gilmore – High Point
- Savannah Noll – USC Upstate
- Caitlyn Nottingham – Radford
- Sloan Spees – Presbyterian
- Ella Vaughn – High Point

1 own goal

- High Point (vs Radford)
- UNC Asheville (vs Radford)

== All-Tournament team ==
Player	Team
Tessa Carlin	High Point
Alex DePerno	High Point
Ella Vaughn	High Point
Alex Dinger	Longwood
Lyla Chadd	Presbyterian
Kelly Hall	Presbyterian
Jashyra Johnson	Radford
Lilly Short	Radford
Anna Doane	UNC Asheville
Paige Armstrong	USC Upstate
**Catarina Dantas**	USC Upstate
Savannah Noll	USC Upstate
Dara Russo	USC Upstate

MVP in bold
