= 2024 Missouri Valley Conference women's soccer tournament =

- Classification: Division I
- Teams: 8
- Matches: 7
- Attendance: 1,930
- Site: Allison South Stadium (Semifinals & Final); Springfield, Missouri
- Champions: Missouri State (4th title)
- Winning coach: Kirk Nelson (2nd title)
- MVP: Grace O'Keefe (Missouri State)
- Broadcast: ESPN+

2024 Missouri Valley Conference women's soccer standings
	Conf.						Overall
Team	W		L		T	PCT	W		L		T	PCT
Missouri State ‍†‍‡‍^{y}	9	–	0	–	1	.950	13	–	5	–	3	.690
Drake ‍‍‍	6	–	2	–	2	.700	8	–	7	–	6	.524
UIC ‍‍‍	6	–	2	–	2	.700	8	–	10	–	2	.450
Belmont ‍‍‍	5	–	4	–	1	.550	9	–	10	–	2	.476
Indiana State ‍‍‍	4	–	3	–	3	.550	10	–	6	–	5	.595
UNI ‍‍‍	4	–	3	–	3	.550	9	–	6	–	4	.579
Illinois State ‍‍‍	3	–	4	–	3	.450	6	–	9	–	4	.421
Southern Illinois ‍‍‍	2	–	5	–	3	.350	6	–	8	–	5	.447
Evansville ‍‍‍	1	–	4	–	5	.350	2	–	7	–	7	.344
Murray State ‍‍‍	1	–	5	–	4	.300	5	–	8	–	5	.417
Valparaiso ‍‍‍	0	–	9	–	1	.050	4	–	13	–	1	.250
† – Conference champion ‡ – 2024 Missouri Valley Tournament champion y – Invited to the NCAA Tournament; As of December 10, 2024; Rankings from United Soccer Coaches Poll; Source:Missouri Valley Conference

The 2024 Missouri Valley Conference women's soccer tournament was the postseason women's soccer tournament for the Missouri Valley Conference held from October 31 through November 10, 2024. The Opening round and Second round was held at campus sites. The semifinals and finals took place at Allison South Stadium in Springfield, Missouri. The eight-team single-elimination tournament consisted of four rounds based on seeding from regular season conference play. The defending champions were the Valparaiso Beacons, who were unsuccessful in defending their crown as they did not qualify for the tournament after finishing last in conference play. The top-seeded Missouri State Bears would go on to win the title, defeating second seed Drake 4–0 in the final. The conference tournament title was the fourth for the Missouri State women's soccer program, and second for head coach Kirk Nelson. As tournament champions, Missouri State earned the Missouri Valley's automatic berth into the 2024 NCAA Division I Women's Soccer Tournament.

== Seeding ==
The top eight of the eleven Missouri Valley Conference women's soccer programs qualified for the 2024 Tournament. Teams were seeded based on their regular season records. A tiebreaker was required to determine the second and third seed in the tournament as Drake and UIC finished with identical 6–2–2 regular season records. The teams faced off on October 17 and Drake won 2–0, therefore earning the second seed. A tiebreaker was required to determine the fifth and sixth seeds as Indiana State and Northern Iowa finished the regular season with identical 4–3–3 records. The two teams tied their regular season match 0–0. The second tiebreaker was record against teams above them in the standings. Indiana State won this tiebreaker and earned the fifth seed.

Seed	School	Conference Record	Points
1	Missouri State	9–0–1	28
2	Drake	6–2–2	20
3	UIC	6–2–2	20
4	Belmont	5–4–1	16
5	Indiana State	4–3–3	15
6	UNI	4–3–3	15
7	Illinois State	3–4–3	12
8	Southern Illinois	2–5–2	9

== Bracket ==
Opening Round; Thursday, Oct. 31
5	Indiana State	2
8	Southern Illinois	1
6	UNI	0
7	Illinois State	1

Second Round; Sunday, Nov. 3
4	Belmont	1
5	Indiana State	0
3	UIC	4
7	Illinois State	2

Semifinals; Friday, Nov. 7
1	Missouri State	2
4	Belmont	0
2	Drake	1
3	UIC	0

Final; Sunday, Nov. 10
1	Missouri State	4
2	Drake	0

== Schedule ==
=== Opening Round ===
October 31, 2024	#6 UNI	0–1	#7 Illinois State	Chicago, IL
2:00 p.m. CDT		Report	60' Kerika Wells	Stadium: Flames Field; Attendance: 105; Referee: Khalaf Al-Latayfeh Malkaw; Assistant referees: Vasilios Vouris; John Kennedy; Fourth official: Irineo Cortes Gallardo

October 31, 2024	#5 Indiana State	2–1	#8 Southern Illinois	Nashville, TN
5:30 p.m. CDT	Mackenzie Kent 1', 26'	Report	16' Maycie Massingill	Stadium: E. S. Rose Park; Attendance: 208; Referee: Shane Butler; Assistant referees: Matthew Rodman; Lucas Cross; Fourth official: Alex Cooper

=== Second Round ===
November 3, 2024	#4 Belmont	1–0	#5 Indiana State	Nashville, TN
2:00 p.m. CST	Team (yellow card) 52'; Kaityln Elliott 64'	Report	(yellow card) 45' Brooklyn Woods	Stadium: E. S. Rose Park; Attendance: 152; Referee: Heber Estrada; Assistant referees: Gustavo Turmero; Tarik Velador; Fourth official: Greg Forrest

November 3, 2024	#3 UIC	4–2	#7 Illinois State	Chicago, IL
4:00 p.m. CST	Makenna Maloy 32'; Kaysey Castro 49'; Hannah Gryzik 72'; Riley Collett 76'; Madison Ferris (yellow card) 88'	Report	7' Eiley Henderson; 61' Aniya Seymore	Stadium: Flames Field; Attendance: 247; Referee: Evangelos Vouris; Assistant referees: Steve Konstantinovic; Simeon Petrov; Fourth official: Esad Omanovic

=== Semifinals ===
November 7, 2024	#2 Drake	1–0	#3 UIC	Springfield, MO
3:00 p.m. CST	Zoey Mahoney (red card) 49'; Madelyn Smith (yellow card) 52'; Eve Blakey 69'; Layla Kelbel (yellow card) 86'	Report		Stadium: Allison South Stadium; Attendance: 198; Referee: Andrew Ellsworth; Assistant referees: Dan Ortega; Andy Wilkinson; Fourth official: Misael Cordero

November 7, 2024	#1 Missouri State	2–0	#4 Belmont	Springfield, MO
6:00 p.m. CST	Julia Kristensen 22'; Maggie O'Keefe 36'	Report	(yellow card) 6' Kate Virtel; (yellow card) 88' Kaitlyn Elliott	Stadium: Allison South Stadium; Attendance: 278; Referee: Eulogio Villalpando; Assistant referees: Tim Wagner; Scottie Stiles; Fourth official: Shadd Delmez

=== Final ===
November 10, 2024	#1 Missouri State	4–0	#2 Drake	Springfield, MO
1:00 p.m. CST	Julia Kristensen 5'; Lillie Rasmussen (yellow card) 17'; Grace O'Keefe 36', 58'; Kaeli Benedict 80'	Report	(yellow card) 19' Angela Gutierrez	Stadium: Allison South Stadium; Attendance: 742; Referee: Alex Beehler; Assistant referees: Zachery Richter; Anthony Sobolevsky; Fourth official: Dan Ortega

== Statistics ==
=== Goalscorers ===
There were 18 goals scored in 7 matches, for an average of 2.57 goals per match (as of November 10, 2024).

3 goals

- Maggie O'Keefe – Missouri State

2 goals

- Mackenzie Kent – Indiana State
- Julia Kristensen – Missouri State

1 goal

- Kaeli Benedict – Missouri State
- Eve Blakey – Drake
- Kaysey Castro – UIC
- Riley Collett – UIC
- Kaityln Elliott – Belmont
- Hannah Gryzik – UIC
- Eiley Henderson – Illinois State
- Makenna Maloy – UIC
- Maycie Massingill – Southern Illinois
- Aniya Seymore – Illinois State
- Kerika Wells – Illinois State

== All-Tournament team ==
Player	Team
Allison Brockelman	Belmont
Kate Virtel	Belmont
Caite Johnson	Drake
Lily Overstreet	Drake
Madeline Smith	Drake
Erika Wells	Illinois State
Mackenzie Kent	Indiana State
Jenna Anderson	Missouri State
Camielle Day	Missouri State
Julia Kristensen	Missouri State
**Grace O'Keefe**	Missouri State
Sophia Balistreri	Northern Iowa
Lucy Horn	Southern Illinois
Riley Collett	UIC
Emmy Higgins	UIC

MVP in bold
