= 2024 America East Conference women's soccer tournament =

- Classification: Division I
- Teams: 6
- Matches: 5
- Attendance: 2,173
- Site: Campus Sites (Higher Seed)
- Champions: Maine (2nd title)
- Winning coach: Scott Atherley (2nd title)
- MVP: Lara Kirkby (Maine)
- Broadcast: ESPN+

2024 America East Conference women's soccer standings
	Conf.						Overall
Team	W		L		T	PCT	W		L		T	PCT
Maine ‍†‍‡‍^{y}	7	–	0	–	1	.938	13	–	2	–	3	.806
New Hampshire ‍‍‍	6	–	2	–	0	.750	12	–	5	–	1	.694
Binghamton ‍‍‍	4	–	2	–	2	.625	7	–	6	–	5	.528
UMass Lowell ‍‍‍	4	–	3	–	1	.563	6	–	10	–	3	.395
Bryant ‍‍‍	3	–	4	–	1	.438	5	–	9	–	4	.389
Vermont ‍‍‍	3	–	4	–	1	.438	8	–	5	–	5	.583
Albany ‍‍‍	2	–	5	–	1	.313	3	–	12	–	1	.219
NJIT ‍‍‍	1	–	5	–	2	.250	4	–	10	–	3	.324
UMBC ‍‍‍	1	–	6	–	1	.188	5	–	12	–	1	.306
† – Conference champion ‡ – 2024 America East Tournament champion y – Invited to the NCAA Tournament; As of December 10, 2024; Rankings from United Soccer Coaches Poll; Source:America East Conference

The 2024 America East Conference women's soccer tournament was the postseason women's soccer tournament for the American East Conference that was held from November 3 through 10th. The five-match tournament took place at campus sites, with the higher seed hosting. The six-team single-elimination tournament consisted of three rounds based on seeding from regular season conference play. The defending champions were the Maine Black Bears, The Black Bears successfully defended their title, defeating New Hampshire 3–0 in the Final. It was the second victory in program history for Maine and the second for twenty-third year head coach Scott Atherly. As tournament champions, Maine earned the America East's automatic berth into the 2024 NCAA Division I women's soccer tournament.

== Seeding ==
The top six teams in the regular season earned a spot in the tournament. Teams were seeded based on their regular season conference records. A tiebreaker was required to determine the fifth and sixth seeds as UMass Lowell and Vermont both finished with 3–4–1 regular season records. UMass Lowell earned the fifth seed by virtue of their 2–0 win over Vermont on October 13.

Seed	School	Conference Record	Points
1	Maine	7–0–1	22
2	New Hampshire	6–2–0	18
3	Binghamton	4–2–2	14
4	UMass Lowell	4–3–1	13
5	Bryant	3–4–1	10
6	Vermont	3–4–1	10

== Bracket ==
Quarterfinals; Monday, Oct. 30
5	Bryant	1
4	UMass Lowell	2
6	Vermont	0 (2)
3	Binghamton (pen.)	0 (3)

Semifinals; Thursday, Nov. 2
1	Maine	2
4	UMass Lowell	0
2	New Hampshire	3
3	Binghamton	1

Final; Sunday, Nov. 5
1	Maine	3
2	New Hampshire	0

== Schedule ==
=== Quarterfinals ===
November 3, 2024	#3 Binghamton	0–0 (a.e.t.) (3–2 p)	#6 Vermont	Vestal, NY
1:00 p.m. EST	Brooke Herber (yellow card) 7'; Alexus Worrell (yellow card) 82'	Report	(yellow card) 4' Torie Snyder; (yellow card) 76' Lauren DeGroot	Stadium: Bearcats Sports Complex; Attendance: 306; Referee: Nathaniel Hirschman; Assistant referees: Chris Borncamp; Edin Hadzovic; Fourth official: Mindy Malia
	Penalties
	Megan Baker (penalty missed); Allison Falvo (penalty scored); Anna Buckwalter (penalty scored); Bella Brown (penalty missed); Sophia Garofalo (penalty missed); Hannah Mimas (penalty scored)		(penalty scored) Jill Brody; (penalty missed) Torie Snyder; (penalty missed) Sydney Remington; (penalty missed) Emma Warren; (penalty scored) Vanessa Smith; (penalty missed) Kate Bossert

November 3, 2024	#4 UMass Lowell	2–1	#5 Bryant	Lowell, MA
3:00 p.m. EST	Hope Santaniello 3'; Mia Eva Girgis 67'	Report	36' Caitlin Forshay	Stadium: Cushing Field; Attendance: 304; Referee: Patrick Violette; Assistant referees: John Lazaro; Adam Cook; Fourth official: Andrew Brownsword

=== Semifinals ===
November 7, 2024	#1 Maine	2–0	#4 UMass Lowell	Orono, ME
6:00 p.m. EST	Kayla Kraemer 5'; Abbey Thornton 69'	Report		Stadium: Mahaney Diamond; Attendance: 445; Referee: Carlos Fernandes; Assistant referees: Johnathan Luk; Shaye Lane; Fourth official: Andrew Porada

November 7, 2024	#2 New Hampshire	3–1	#3 Binghamton	Durham, NH
6:00 p.m. EST	Elizabeth Finn 32', 66'; Abbi Maier 44'	Report	10' Mackenzie Ryder	Stadium: Bremner Field; Attendance: 392; Referee: Katherine Mitchell; Assistant referees: Nicola Vesia; Sandro Araujo; Fourth official: John Jordan

=== Final ===
November 10, 2024	#1 Maine	3–0	#2 New Hampshire	Orono, ME
3:00 p.m. EST	Jordane Pinette 3'; Abby Kraemer 12'; Rebecca Grisdale (yellow card) 17' (yellow-red card) 80'; Kristina Kelly (yellow card) 46'; Lara Kirkby 68'	Report	(yellow card) 46' Elizabeth Finn	Stadium: Mahaney Diamond; Attendance: 726; Referee: Daniel Shenk Moreno; Assistant referees: Douglas Scaffidi; Matt Stein; Fourth official: Reindole Bantul

== Statistics ==
=== Goalscorers ===
There were 12 goals scored in 5 matches, for an average of 2.4 goals per match (as of November 10, 2024).

2 goals

- Elizabeth Finn – New Hampshire
- Kayla Kraemer – Maine

1 goal

- Caitlin Forshay – Bryant
- Mia Eva Girgis – UMass Lowell
- Lara Kirkby – Maine
- Abbi Maier – New Hampshire
- Jordane Pinette – Maine
- Mackenzie Ryder – Binghamton
- Hope Santaniello – UMass Lowell
- Abbey Thornton – Maine

== All-Tournament team ==
Player	Team
**Lara Kirkby**	Maine
Abby Kraemer	Maine
Emma Scheider	Maine
Myla Schneider	Maine
Elizabeth Finn	New Hampshire
Megan Logue	New Hampshire
Abbi Maier	New Hampshire
Megan Banzi	UMass Lowell
Emma Mitchell	UMass Lowell
Brooke Herber	Binghamton
MacKenzie Ryder	Binghamton
Laney Ross	Bryant

MVP in bold
