= 2024 Ohio Valley Conference women's soccer tournament =

- Classification: Division I
- Teams: 8
- Matches: 7
- Attendance: 1,926
- Site: Tech Soccer Field; Cookeville, Tennessee (Semifinals & Final)
- Champions: Lindenwood (1st title)
- Winning coach: Dave Musso (1st title)
- MVP: Mackenzie Compton (Lindenwood)
- Broadcast: ESPN+

2024 Ohio Valley Conference women's soccer standings
	Conf.						Overall
Team	W		L		T	PCT	W		L		T	PCT
Tennessee Tech ‍†‍‍	6	–	2	–	1	.722	6	–	8	–	6	.450
Little Rock ‍‍‍	4	–	1	–	4	.667	7	–	7	–	5	.500
Lindenwood* ‍‍‡‍	4	–	1	–	4	.667	11	–	5	–	4	.650
Southern Indiana ‍‍‍	4	–	2	–	3	.611	5	–	9	–	5	.395
Morehead St. ‍‍‍^{y}	4	–	3	–	2	.556	9	–	8	–	6	.522
Eastern Illinois ‍‍‍	3	–	3	–	3	.500	5	–	8	–	6	.421
SEMO ‍‍‍	2	–	4	–	3	.389	3	–	11	–	3	.265
UT Martin ‍‍‍	3	–	6	–	0	.333	4	–	11	–	3	.306
SIUE ‍‍‍	1	–	3	–	5	.389	2	–	7	–	7	.344
Western Illinois ‍‍‍	1	–	7	–	1	.167	1	–	14	–	1	.094
* Ineligible for the 2024 NCAA tournament due to transition from Division II.
† – Conference champion ‡ – 2024 OVC Tournament champion y – Invited to the NCAA Tournament; As of December 10, 2024; Rankings from United Soccer Coaches Poll; Source:Ohio Valley Conference Note: Morehead State clinches automatic bid as runner-up in conference tournament because Lindenwood is still in the "period of transition" from Division II to Division I level.

The 2024 Ohio Valley Conference women's soccer tournament was the postseason women's soccer tournament for the Ohio Valley Conference held from October 31 through November 10, 2024. The first round and quarterfinals of the tournament were held at campus sites hosted by the #3 and #4 seeds, while the semifinals and final took place at Tech Soccer Field in Cookeville, Tennessee. The eight-team single-elimination tournament consisted of four rounds based on seeding from regular season conference play. The Morehead State Eagles were the defending champions. The conference tournament title was the fourth for the Morehead State women's soccer program, and the first for head coach Chris Fox. This was Morehead State's first title since 2013. and were unable to defend their title as they lost to Lindenwood 3–2 in the Final. The conference tournament title was the first for the Lindenwood women's soccer program, and the first for head coach Dave Musso. As tournament champions, Lindenwood would have earned the Ohio Valley's automatic berth into the 2024 NCAA Division I women's soccer tournament, but they were disqualified as they were in a "period of transition" from Division II to Division I. Therefore, runner-up, Morehead State earned the automatic bid for the second season in a row.

== Seeding ==
Eight of the ten teams in the Ohio Valley Conference qualified for the 2024 Tournament. The #1 seed was awarded as the host institution for the Semifinals and Finals of the tournament. The #1 and #2 seed received byes to the Semifinals, while the #4 and #5 seeds received byes to the Quarterfinals. Seems were seeded based on regular season records. A tiebreaker was needed to determine the second and third seeds as Lindenwood and Little Rock both finished with 4–1–4 regular season records. The two teams drew 0–0 during their October 20 regular season match-up. The second tiebreaker was record against teams above the tied teams in the standings. Little Rock defeated Tennessee Tech 1–0 during the regular season, while Lindenwood lost to Tech 0–2. Therefore, Little Rock earned the second seed and a bye into the Semifinals. A second tiebreaker was required as Southeast Missouri and UT Martin tied with nine regular season points each. The two teams met on the final day of the regular season, October 27, and Southeast Missouri won 2–0. Therefore, Southeast Missouri earned the seventh seed.

Seed	School	Conference Record	Points
1	Tennessee Tech	6–2–1	19
2	Little Rock	4–1–4	16
3	Lindenwood	4–1–4	16
4	Southern Indiana	4–2–3	15
5	Morehead State	4–3–2	14
6	Eastern Illinois	3–3–3	12
7	Southeast Missouri	2–4–3	9
8	UT Martin	3–6–0	9

== Bracket ==
First round Thursday, Oct. 31
5	Morehead State	1
8	UT Martin	0
6	Eastern Illinois	1
7	Southeast Missouri	2

Quarterfinals; Sunday, Nov. 3
4	Southern Indiana	1
5	Morehead State	2
3	Lindenwood	4
7	Southeast Missouri	0

Semifinals; Thursday, Nov. 7
1	Tennessee Tech	0 (0)
5	Morehead State (pen.)	0 (3)
2	Little Rock	0
3	Lindenwood	1

Final; Sunday, Nov. 10
5	Morehead State	2
3	Lindenwood	3

== Schedule ==
=== First round ===
October 31, 2024	#5 Morehead State	1–0	#8 UT Martin	Evansville, IN
1:00 p.m. CDT	Hedda Ornberg 3'	Report		Stadium: Strassweg Field; Attendance: 148; Referee: Gustavo Turmero; Assistant referees: Grace Barrett; Aaron Rawlins; Fourth official: Hunter Wesson

October 31, 2024	#6 Eastern Illinois	1–2	#7 Southeast Missouri	St. Charles, MO
7:00 p.m. CDT	Kate Germano (yellow card) 30'; Alex Tetteh 46'	Report	23', (yellow card) 30' Justi Nelson; 84' Elizabeth Rater; (yellow card) 87' Melissa Kubin	Stadium: Hunter Stadium; Attendance: 153; Referee: Michael Heath; Assistant referees: Justin Tomicich; David Henderson

=== Quarterfinals ===
November 3, 2024	#4 Southern Indiana	1–2	#5 Morehead State	Evansville, IN
1:00 p.m. CST	Eva Boer 4', (yellow card) 18'	Report	55' Hedda Ornberg; (yellow card) 61' Erin Fite; 88' Anna Lohrer	Stadium: Strassweg Field; Attendance: 276; Referee: Joshua Brooks; Assistant referees: Cody Kerstiens; Hunter Wesson; Fourth official: Chad Dempsey

November 3, 2024	#3 Lindenwood	4–0	#7 Southeast Missouri	St. Charles, MO
5:00 p.m. CST	Anna Johnson 3'; Mackenzie Compton 3', 16', (yellow card) 59'; Maddy Vasiloff 76'	Report	(yellow card) 59' Sophie Shrum; (yellow card) 89' Katelyn Miller	Stadium: Hunter Stadium; Attendance: 356; Referee: Don Tebeau; Assistant referees: John Bouc; Benjamin Koening

=== Semifinals ===
November 7, 2024	#1 Tennessee Tech	0–0 (a.e.t.) (0–3 p)	#5 Morehead State	Cookeville, TN
12:00 p.m. CST	Bella Garrett (yellow card) 30'	Report	(yellow card) 79' Ella Fuller	Stadium: Tech Soccer Field; Referee: Ryan Starr; Assistant referees: Seth Wilson; Nicole Steiner; Fourth official: Jason Steiner
	Penalties
	Katie Toney (penalty missed); Claire Palya (penalty missed); Tori Soutuyo (penalty missed)		(penalty scored) Gracen Houck; (penalty scored) Hedda Ornberg; (penalty scored) Kennedy Baquero

November 7, 2024	#2 Little Rock	0–1	#3 Lindenwood	Cookeville, TN
3:00 p.m. CST	Amaya Arias (yellow card) 85'	Report	38' Georgia Pardalos; (yellow card) 72' Mattie Ohlsen	Stadium: Tech Soccer Field; Attendance: 615; Referee: Eric Phillips; Assistant referees: Jessica Medley; Lucy Bell; Fourth official: Mandi Burley

=== Final ===
November 10, 2024	#3 Lindenwood	3–2	#5 Morehead State	Cookeville, TN
1:00 p.m. CST	Mackenzie Compton 50'; Anna Johnson 83'; Tasneem Dizdarevic 86' (pen.)	Report	21' Lindenwood Own Goal; 33' Hedda Ornberg; (yellow card) 62' Hannah Burke; (yellow card) 62' Anna Lohrer	Stadium: Tech Soccer Field; Attendance: 378; Referee: Todd Carver; Assistant referees: Judson Holden; Devin Bargatze; Fourth official: John Devalk

== Statistics ==
=== Goalscorers ===
There were 17 goals scored in 7 matches, for an average of 2.43 goals per match (as of November 10, 2024).

3 goals

- Mackenzie Compton – Lindenwood
- Hedda Ornberg – Morehead State

2 goals

- Anna Johnson – Lindenwood

1 goal

- Eva Boer – Southern Indiana
- Tasneem Dizdarevic – Lindenwood
- Anna Lohrer – Morehead State
- Justi Nelson – Southeast Missouri
- Georgia Pardalos – Lindenwood
- Elizabeth Rater – Southeast Missouri
- Alex Tetteh – Eastern Illinois
- Maddy Vasiloff – Lindenwood

1 own goal

- Lindenwood (vs. Morehead State)

== All-Tournament team ==
Player	Team
**Mackenzie Compton**	Lindenwood
Rachel Jackson	Lindenwood
Georgia Pardalos	Lindenwood
Eyglo Thosteinsdottir	Lindenwood
Camryn Jacobs	Little Rock
Abbie Smith	Little Rock
Gracen Houck	Morehead State
Anna Lohrer	Morehead State
Hedda Ornberg	Morehead State
Allison Lee	Tennessee Tech
Meredith Nye	Tennessee Tech

MVP in bold
