= 2024 SWAC women's soccer tournament =

- Classification: Division I
- Teams: 8
- Matches: 7
- Attendance: 3,933
- Site: PVA&M Soccer Stadium; Prairie View, Texas
- Champions: Southern (1st title)
- Winning coach: Jeremy Fontenot (1st title)
- MVP: Alyssa Romero (Southern)
- Broadcast: SWAC Digital Network

2024 SWAC women's soccer standings
	Conf.						Overall
Team	W		L		T	PCT	W		L		T	PCT
Texas Southern ‍†‍‍	6	–	1	–	1	.813	8	–	8	–	2	.500
Grambling State ‍‍‍	6	–	2	–	0	.750	9	–	8	–	3	.525
Southern ‍‍‡‍^{y}	5	–	1	–	2	.750	9	–	10	–	2	.476
Alabama A&M ‍‍‍	4	–	3	–	1	.563	7	–	11	–	1	.395
Jackson State ‍‍‍	2	–	2	–	4	.500	2	–	8	–	5	.300
Alabama State ‍‍‍	2	–	3	–	3	.438	5	–	8	–	3	.406
Mississippi Valley State ‍‍‍	1	–	3	–	4	.375	2	–	9	–	4	.267
Prairie View A&M ‍‍‍	0	–	4	–	4	.250	1	–	11	–	4	.188
UAPB ‍‍‍	0	–	7	–	1	.063	1	–	12	–	2	.133
† – Conference champion ‡ – 2024 SWAC Tournament champion y – Invited to the NCAA Tournament; As of December 10, 2024; Rankings from United Soccer Coaches Poll; Source: SWAC

The 2024 SWAC women's soccer tournament was the postseason women's soccer tournament for the Southwestern Athletic Conference held November 7–10, 2024. The seven-match tournament took place at the Prairie View A&M Soccer Stadium in Prairie View, Texas. The eight-team single-elimination tournament consisted of three rounds based on seeding from regular season conference play. The defending champions were the Grambling State Tigers, however they were unable to defend their title, as they were defeated in a penalty shoot-out in the Semifinals by Southern. Southern would go on to defeat top-seed Texas Southern 1–0 in the Final. The conference tournament title was the first in the history of the Southern women's soccer program, and first for head coach Jeremy Fontenot. As tournament champions, Southern earned the SWAC's automatic berth into the 2024 NCAA Division I women's soccer tournament.

== Seeding ==
Eight of the nine teams that compete in women's soccer in the SWAC qualified for the 2024 Tournament. There were only nine teams in this season due to Alcorn State cancelling its season after not having enough players to field a team. Seeding was based on regular season conference play. No tiebreakers were required as each SWAC team finished with a different conference point total.

Seed	School	Conference Record	Points
1	Texas Southern	6–1–1	19
2	Grambling State	6–2–0	18
3	Southern	5–1–2	17
4	Alabama A&M	4–3–1	13
5	Jackson State	2–2–4	10
6	Alabama State	2–3–3	9
7	Mississippi Valley State	1–3–4	7
8	Prairie View A&M	0–4–4	4

== Bracket ==
Quarterfinals; Thursday, Nov. 7
1	Texas Southern	2
8	Prairie View A&M	0
4	Alabama A&M	2
5	Jackson State	1
2	Grambling State	3
7	Mississippi Valley State	1
3	Southern	2
6	Alabama State	1

Semifinals; Friday, Nov. 8
1	Texas Southern	2
4	Alabama A&M	0
2	Grambling State	0 (5)
3	Southern (pen.)	0 (6)

Final; Sunday, Nov. 10
1	Texas Southern	0
3	Southern	1

== Schedule ==
=== Quarterfinals ===
November 7, 2024	#1 Texas Southern	2–0	#8 Prairie View A&M	Prairie View, TX
10:00 a.m. CST	Victoria Pucci 52'; Brianna Miles 83'; Ibukun Lawson (yellow card) 89'	Report		Stadium: PVA&M Soccer Stadium; Attendance: 462; Referee: Frank Huber; Assistant referees: William Molina; Ruben Campillo; Fourth official: Lawerence Hale

November 7, 2024	#4 Alabama A&M	2–1	#5 Jackson State	Prairie View, TX
1:00 p.m. CST	Albany Rios 33'; Jamsine Perez-Acosta 53'	Report	(yellow card) 8' Sarah Portis; 41' Checule Dowling	Stadium: PVA&M Soccer Stadium; Attendance: 573; Referee: Wes Caouette; Assistant referees: Alfred Wims; Lawerence Hale; Fourth official: William Molina

November 7, 2024	#2 Grambling State	3–1	#7 Mississippi Valley State	Prairie View, TX
4:00 p.m. CST	Morgan Johnson 31'; Sophia Lezizidis 56', 74'	Report	(yellow card) 20' Gloria Martinez; (yellow card) 68' Kgotlelelo Malefo; 84' Liana Bryant; (yellow card) 88' Valerie Greet	Stadium: PVA&M Soccer Stadium; Attendance: 343; Referee: Alex DeRostaing; Assistant referees: Sean Caouette; Alfred Wims; Fourth official: Bill Bolsen III

November 7, 2024	#3 Southern	2–1	#6 Alabama State	Prairie View, TX
7:00 p.m. CST	J'Lea Berry 39'; Keilyn Pittman 86'	Report	26' Rachel Mull	Stadium: PVA&M Soccer Stadium; Attendance: 643; Referee: Lawrence Hale; Assistant referees: Bill Bolsen III; Sean Caouette; Fourth official: Wes Caouette

=== Semifinals ===
November 8, 2024	#1 Texas Southern	2–1	#4 Alabama A&M	Prairie View, TX
3:00 p.m. CST	Victoria Pucci 26'; Kourtney Celaya 35'	Report	7' India Gaiten; (yellow card) 88' Team	Stadium: PVA&M Soccer Stadium; Attendance: 434

November 8, 2024	#2 Grambling State	0–0 (a.e.t.) (5–6 p)	#3 Southern	Prairie View, TX
6:00 p.m. CST	Ronya Halleen (yellow card) 80'; Kayla Reed (yellow card) 81'	Report	(yellow card) 44' J'Lea Berry	Stadium: PVA&M Soccer Stadium; Attendance: 630
	Penalties
	Khori Banks (penalty missed); Morgan Johnson (penalty missed); Alana Aiken (penalty scored); Aria Whitney (penalty scored); Sophia Lazari (penalty scored); Kaylen Jankans (penalty scored); Aubrey Salzar (penalty scored); Ronya Halleen (penalty missed)		(penalty scored) Tori Thomas; (penalty scored) Bailey Williams; (penalty missed) Shania Walters; (penalty scored) J'Lea Berry; (penalty missed) Sydney Bellamy; (penalty scored) San'aa Doss; (penalty scored) Alyssa Romero; (penalty scored) Dasia Howard

=== Final ===
November 10, 2024	#1 Texas Southern	0–1	#3 Southern	Prairie View, TX
1:00 p.m. CST		Report	17', (yellow card) 78' Taylor Henry; (yellow card) 73' Journee Mitchell; (yellow card) 76' Bailey Williams	Stadium: PVA&M Soccer Stadium; Attendance: 848; Referee: Wes Couette; Assistant referees: Alfred Wims; Sean Caouette; Fourth official: Alex DeRostaing

== Statistics ==
=== Goalscorers ===
There were 16 goals scored in 7 matches, for an average of 2.29 goals per match (as of November 10, 2024).

2 goals

- Sophia Lezizidis – Grambling State
- Victoria Pucci – Texas Southern

1 goal

- J'Lea Berry – Southern
- Liana Bryant – Mississippi Valley State
- Kourtney Celaya – Texas Southern
- Checule Dowling – Jackson State
- India Gaiten – Alabama A&M
- Taylor Henry – Southern
- Morgan Johnson – Grambling State
- Brianna Miles – Texas Southern
- Rachel Mull – Alabama State
- Keilyn Pittman – Southern
- Jamsine Perez-Acosta – Alabama A&M
- Albany Rios – Alabama A&M

== All-Tournament team ==
Player	Team
Sarah De Gannes	Alabama A&M
Sophia Lezizidis	Grambling State
Kaylen Jankans	Grambling State
Isabella Dillow	Texas Southern
Melissa Knutson	Texas Southern
Victoria Pucci	Texas Southern
Sydney Bellamy	Southern
Taylor Henry	Southern
**Alyssa Romero**	Southern
Tori Thomas	Southern
Zemira Webb	Southern

MVP in bold
