= 2024 Summit League women's soccer tournament =

2024 Summit League Women's soccer tournament
- Classification: Division I
- Teams: 6
- Matches: 5
- Site: Campus Sites
- Champions: South Dakota State (8th title)
- Winning coach: Brock Thompson (4th title)
- MVP: Kaycee Manding (SDSU)
- Broadcast: Summit League Network
Summit League Women's soccer tournament
«2023	2025»

2024 Summit League women's soccer standings
	Conf.						Overall
Team	W		L		T	PCT	W		L		T	PCT
North Dakota State ‍†‍‍	6	–	1	–	1	.813	10	–	5	–	4	.632
Denver ‍‍‍	5	–	1	–	2	.750	11	–	6	–	2	.632
South Dakota State ‍‍‡‍^{y}	5	–	2	–	1	.688	15	–	5	–	2	.727
Omaha ‍‍‍	4	–	1	–	3	.688	10	–	3	–	5	.694
Oral Roberts ‍‍‍	3	–	2	–	3	.563	9	–	8	–	5	.523
South Dakota ‍‍‍	1	–	3	–	4	.375	3	–	9	–	6	.333
St. Thomas* ‍‍‍	1	–	5	–	2	.250	5	–	9	–	3	.382
North Dakota ‍‍‍	0	–	4	–	4	.250	4	–	8	–	6	.389
Kansas City ‍‍‍	1	–	7	–	0	.125	7	–	8	–	3	.472
† – Conference champion ‡ – Summit League tournament champion y – Invited to the NCAA tournament * Ineligible for the 2024 NCAA tournament due to transition from Division III; As of December 10, 2024; Rankings from United Soccer Coaches Poll; Source: Summit League

The 2024 Summit League women's soccer tournament was the postseason women's soccer tournament for the Summit League and was held on November 1–2, 7 and 10, 2024. The five match tournament took place once again at various campus sites. The six-team single elimination tournament consisted of three rounds based on seeding from regular season conference play. The South Dakota State Jackrabbits were the defending champions and successfully defended their title, winning the tournament crown two seasons in a row.

== Seeding ==
The top six of the nine teams competing during the regular season qualified for the 2024 tournament. Seeding was based on regular season conference records. Tiebreakers were used as needed.

Seed	School	Conference Record	Points
1	North Dakota State	6–1–1	19
2	Denver	5–1–2	17
3	South Dakota State	5–2–1	16
4	Omaha	4–1–3	15
5	Oral Roberts	3–2–3	12
6	South Dakota	1–3–4	7

== Bracket ==
Quarterfinals; Friday, November 1 Saturday, November 2
4	Omaha	0
5	Oral Roberts	2
3	South Dakota State (2OT)	2
6	South Dakota	1

Semifinals; Thursday, November 7
1	North Dakota State	0 (3)
5	Oral Roberts (PK's)	0 (5)
2	Denver	1
3	South Dakota State	2

Final; Sunday, November 10
5	Oral Roberts	1
3	South Dakota State	3

== Schedule ==
The 2024 schedule included the quarterfinals being played on November 1 and 2, the semifinals on November 7, and the finals on November 10. The quarterfinal games were hosted by the higher seeds in the two matchups, and then the semifinals and championship were hosted by the top seed.

=== Quarterfinals ===
November 1, 2024	#3 South Dakota State	2–1 (a.e.t.)	#6 South Dakota	Brookings, SD
6:00 p.m. CT	Katherine Jones 85'; Katelyn Beulke (yellow card) 92'; Kaycee Manding 100'	Report	Brooklyn Bordson 53'; Janaina Zanan (yellow card) 67'; Campbell Zimmers (yellow card) 100'	Stadium: Fishback Soccer Park; Attendance: 324; Referee: Sean Giza; Assistant referees: Soner Dogan; Okey Abara; Fourth official: Chris Limmer

November 2, 2024	#4 Omaha	0–2	#5 Oral Roberts	Omaha, NE
5:00 p.m. CT	Emilie Erland (yellow card) 24'; Grace Ostergaard (yellow card) 70'; Cece Behrens (yellow card) 88'	Report	Samantha Guzman 11'; Jordan Grigsby (yellow card) 20'; Julia Thasaphong (yellow card) 27'; Lela Stark 56'	Stadium: Al F. Caniglia Field; Attendance: 180; Referee: Zachary Richter; Assistant referees: Tatum Richter; Bobby Simetich; Fourth official: Brittny Seem

=== Semifinals ===
November 7, 2024	#2 Denver	1–2	#3 South Dakota State	Fargo, ND
12:00 p.m. CT	Ella Frost (yellow card) 67'; Jordan Crockett (yellow card) 71'; Megan Murray (yellow card) 73'; Jadyn Goodrich 88'	Report	Kaycee Manding 28'; Avery LeBlanc 60'; Mia Bosch (yellow card) 89'	Stadium: Dacotah Field; Attendance: 200; Referee: Cesar Ibarra; Assistant referees: Zakaria Aly; Ryan Farrell; Fourth official: Matt Tiano

November 7, 2024	#1 North Dakota State	0–0 (a.e.t.) (3–5 p)	#5 Oral Roberts	Fargo, ND
3:30 p.m. CT	Ava Stanchina (yellow card) 35'	Report	Lela Stark (yellow card) 53'; Carson Arne (yellow card) 86'	Stadium: Dacotah Field; Attendance: 396; Referee: Chris Ruska; Assistant referees: John Krill; Eric Wood; Fourth official: Matt Tiano
	Penalties
	Amaya Garrett (penalty scored); Hannah Arnold (penalty scored); Tyreese Zacher (penalty scored); Morgan Russman (penalty missed)		Samantha Guzman (penalty scored); Kennedy Langebartels (penalty scored); Julia Thasaphong (penalty scored); Marcella Alves (penalty scored); Carson Arne (penalty scored)

=== Final ===
November 10, 2024	#5 Oral Roberts	1–3	#3 South Dakota State	Fargo, ND
1:00 p.m. CT	Marlee Fray 62'	Report	Hailee Christensen 13'; Katelyn Beulke 14'; Katelyn Beulke 47'	Stadium: Dacotah Field; Attendance: 192; Referee: Art Arustamyan; Assistant referees: Connor Dunn; Matt Von Pinnon; Fourth official: Matt Tiano

== Statistics ==
=== Goalscorers ===
There were 11 goals scored in 5 matches, for an average of 2.2 goals per match (as of November 10, 2024).

2 goals

- Kaycee Manding – South Dakota State
- Katelyn Beulke – South Dakota State

1 goal

- Jadyn Goodrich – Denver
- Samantha Guzman – Oral Roberts
- Lela Stark – Oral Roberts
- Brooklyn Bordson – South Dakota
- Katherine Jones – South Dakota State
- Avery LeBlanc – South Dakota State
- Hailee Christensen – South Dakota State
- Marlee Fray – Oral Roberts

== All-Tournament Team ==
Player	Team
Kaycee Manding (MVP)	South Dakota State
Haley Lindaman	South Dakota State
Katherine Jones	South Dakota State
Haliee Christensen	South Dakota State
Carson Arne	Oral Roberts
Riley Baldwin	Oral Roberts
Jordan Grigsby	Oral Roberts
Amaya Garrett	North Dakota State
Ellie Sanchez	North Dakota State
Ella Frost	Denver
Liv Moritz	Denver
Brooklyn Bordson	South Dakota
Grace Ostergaard	Omaha
