= Presbyterian Blue Hose women's soccer =

American college soccer team

- University: Presbyterian College
- Head coach: Matt Smith (1st season)
- Conference: Big South
- Location: Clinton, South Carolina, US
- Stadium: Edens Field at Martin Stadium
- Nickname: Blue Hose
- Colors: Blue and garnet

The Presbyterian Blue Hose women's soccer team represents Presbyterian College in the Big South Conference of NCAA Division I soccer. The program was founded in 1989, and is currently led by Brian Purcell, in his thirtieth season.

== Seasons ==
| Year | Head Coach | Overall | Conference |
|---|---|---|---|
| 1989 | Brian Purcell | 5–11–0 | – |
| 1990 | Brian Purcell | 11–5–1 | 3–1–0 SAC |
| 1991 | Brian Purcell | 6–9–1 | 3–3–0 SAC |
| 1992 | Brian Purcell | 14–7–0 | 6–1–0 SAC |
| 1993 | Brian Purcell | 13–5–0 | 5–2–0 SAC |
| 1994 | Brian Purcell | 15–3–0 | 7–0–0 SAC |
| 1995 | Brian Purcell | 15–5–0 | 6–1–0 SAC |
| 1996 | Brian Purcell | 15–3–1 | 6–0–1 SAC |
| 1997 | Brian Purcell | 13–6–1 | 6–1–0 SAC |
| 1998 | Brian Purcell | 12–6–0 | 6–1–0 SAC |
| 1999 | Brian Purcell | 15–2–0 | 7–0–1 SAC |
| 2000 | Brian Purcell | 12–5–1 | 5–1–1 SAC |
| 2001 | Brian Purcell | 11–5–1 | 5–2–0 SAC |
| 2002 | Brian Purcell | 12–4–1 | 4–2–1 SAC |
| 2003 | Brian Purcell | 14–6–1 | 5–2–0 SAC |
| 2004 | Brian Purcell | 8–7–2 | 3–3–1 SAC |
| 2005 | Brian Purcell | 6–9–1 | 1–5–1 SAC |
| 2006 | Brian Purcell | 8–10–0 | 3–4–0 SAC |
| 2007 | Brian Purcell | 6–7–1 | – |
| 2008 | Brian Purcell | 5–10–2 | 3–4–2 Big South |
| 2009 | Brian Purcell | 3–12–2 | 0–7–2 Big South |
| 2010 | Brian Purcell | 5–13–1 | 2–7–0 Big South |
| 2011 | Brian Purcell | 4–13–2 | 2–6–2 Big South |
| 2012 | Brian Purcell | 3–15–0 | 3–8–0 Big South |
| 2013 | Brian Purcell | 9–9–0 | 6–5–0 Big South |
| 2014 | Brian Purcell | 3–10–3 | 0–7–3 Big South |
| 2015 | Brian Purcell | 6–11–1 | 2–7–1 Big South |
| 2016 | Brian Purcell | 3–14–0 | 1–8–0 Big South |
| 2017 | Brian Purcell | 3–13–0 | 1–8–0 Big South |
