= Waipiʻo Peninsula Soccer Stadium =

Soccer stadium in Waipahu, Hawaiʻi

Coordinates: 21°22′28″N 157°59′58″W

Waipio Peninsula Soccer Stadium
- Mosquito Junction
- Interactive map of Waipio Peninsula Soccer Stadium
- Former names: Waipio Peninsula Soccer Stadium
- Address: Waipahu, Oʻahu, Hawaiʻi; United States
- Owner: Soccer Hawaiʻi (?)
- Operator: Soccer Hawaiʻi; UH Athletics
- Capacity: 4,500 (all-seated)
- Type: Stadium
- Surface: Natural grass
- Current use: Soccer

Construction
- Opened: 2000; 26 years ago

Tenants
- Hawaii Rainbow Wahine soccer (2000–present); Other local teams

Waipiʻo Peninsula Soccer Stadium is a 4,500 seat soccer-specific stadium located on the grounds of the Waipiʻo Soccer Complex in Waipahu, Hawaiʻi. WPSS also boasts two main locker rooms, two training rooms, concession booths and administrative offices.

The stadium is used by the University of Hawaii at Manoa's Rainbow Wahine soccer team, along with several senior and junior local teams from the island of Oʻahu.

Outside of the stadium, the complex features 23 FIFA regulation soccer pitches.
