= 2021 Wake Forest Demon Deacons women's soccer team =

American college soccer season

2021 Wake Forest Demon Deacons women's soccer

NCAA Tournament, Second Round
- Conference: Atlantic Coast Conference
- Record: 16–6–0 (6–4–0 ACC)
- Head coach: Tony da Luz (19th season)
- Assistant coaches: Courtney Owen (5th season); Brittany Cameron (2nd season)
- Home stadium: Spry Stadium

2021 ACC women's soccer standings
	Conf.						Overall
Team	W		L		T	PCT	W		L		T	PCT
No. 8 Virginia ‍†‍‍^{y}	8	–	0	–	2	.900	18	–	3	–	2	.826
No. 1 Florida State ‍‍‡‍^{y}	7	–	1	–	2	.800	21	–	1	–	3	.900
No. 5 Duke ‍‍‍^{y}	7	–	2	–	1	.750	16	–	4	–	1	.786
No. 16 Notre Dame ‍‍‍^{y}	7	–	3	–	0	.700	14	–	6	–	2	.682
Clemson ‍‍‍^{y}	6	–	3	–	1	.650	12	–	7	–	1	.625
No. 14 North Carolina ‍‍‍^{y}	5	–	2	–	3	.650	12	–	3	–	3	.750
No. 25 Wake Forest ‍‍‍^{y}	6	–	4	–	0	.600	16	–	6	–	0	.727
Virginia Tech ‍‍‍^{y}	5	–	3	–	2	.600	12	–	6	–	2	.650
Pittsburgh ‍‍‍	4	–	6	–	0	.400	11	–	7	–	0	.611
NC State ‍‍‍^{y}	4	–	6	–	0	.400	9	–	9	–	2	.500
Louisville ‍‍‍	3	–	6	–	1	.350	7	–	7	–	2	.500
Boston College ‍‍‍	1	–	9	–	0	.100	7	–	10	–	1	.417
Miami (FL) ‍‍‍	1	–	9	–	0	.100	4	–	12	–	0	.250
Syracuse ‍‍‍	0	–	10	–	0	.000	4	–	12	–	1	.265
† – Conference champion ‡ – 2021 ACC Tournament champion y – Invited to the NCAA Tournament; As of December 7, 2021; Rankings from United Soccer Coaches Poll; Source: The ACC

The 2021 Wake Forest Demon Deacons women's soccer team represented Wake Forest University during the 2021 NCAA Division I women's soccer season. The Demon Deacons were led by head coach Tony da Luz, in his nineteenth season. They played home games at Spry Stadium. This is the team's 27th season playing organized women's college soccer, all of which have been played in the Atlantic Coast Conference.

The Demon Deacons finished the season 16–6–0 overall, and 6–4–0 in ACC play to finish in sixth place. As the sixth seed in the ACC Tournament, they defeated Duke in the First Round before losing in overtime to eventual champions Florida State in the Semifinals. They received an at-large bid to the NCAA Tournament. As an unseeded team, they defeated Harvard in the First Round before losing to Michigan in the Second Round to end their season.

== Previous season ==
Due to the COVID-19 pandemic, the ACC played a reduced schedule in 2020 and the NCAA Tournament was postponed to 2021. The ACC did not play a spring league schedule, but did allow teams to play non-conference games that would count toward their 2020 record in the lead up to the NCAA Tournament.

The Demon Deacons finished the fall season 3–5–1, 3–4–1 in ACC play to finish in ninth place. They did not qualify for the ACC Tournament. They finished the spring season 2–2–1 and were not invited to the NCAA Tournament.

== Squad ==
=== Roster ===
As of August 10, 2021

Note: Flags indicate national team as defined under FIFA eligibility rules; some limited exceptions apply. Players may hold more than one non-FIFA nationality.

No.	Pos.	Nation	Player
00	GK	USA	Madison Howard
1	GK	USA	Kaitlyn Parks
2	MF	USA	Reese Kim
3	MF	USA	Giovanna DeMarco
4	MF	CAN	Nikayla Small
5	FW	USA	Ashley Frank
6	MF	USA	Madeline Allburn
7	DF	ISL	Kristin Johnson
8	MF	USA	Kristi Vierra
9	FW	USA	Jenna Menta
10	MF	ENG	Malaika Meena
11	FW	USA	Liv Stowell
13	MF	USA	Emily Morris
14	FW	USA	Carrie McIntire
15	MF	USA	Faith Adams
16	GK	USA	Mia Raben
17	DF	USA	Tyla Ochoa
18	DF	USA	Kate Dobsch

No.	Pos.	Nation	Player
19	MF	USA	Lyndon Wood
20	FW	JAM	Shayla Smart
21	FW	USA	Ryanne Brown
22	DF	USA	Sasha Schwartz
23	MF	USA	Lauren Tangney
24	DF	USA	Zara Chavoshi
25	MF	USA	Sophie Faircloth
26	DF	USA	Mia Albery
27	DF	USA	Nadia DeMarinis
28	MF	USA	Sofia Rossi
29	DF	USA	Olivia DeMarinis
30	MF	USA	Anna Swanson
31	MF	USA	Olivia Duvall
32	MF	USA	Emily Silva
33	DF	USA	Abbie Colton
34	DF	USA	Laurel Ansbrow
35	GK	USA	Payton Cahill
88	FW	ISL	Hulda Arnarsdottir

=== Team management ===
Position	Staff
Head coach	Tony da Luz
Assistant Coach	Courtney Owen
Assistant Coach	Brittany Cameron

== Schedule ==
Date Time, TV	Rank^{#}	Opponent^{#}	Result	Record	Site City, State
Exhibition
August 9; 6:00 p.m.		No. 7 Clemson	T 2–2	–	Spry Stadium; Winston-Salem, NC
August 12; 6:00 p.m.		No. 17 South Carolina	L 0–2	–	Spry Stadium; Winston-Salem, NC
Non-conference regular season
August 19*; 7:00 p.m., ACCNX		UIC	W 1–0	1–0–0	Spry Stadium (634); Winston-Salem, NC
August 22*; 7:00 p.m., ACCN		High Point	W 3–0	2–0–0	Spry Stadium (525); Winston-Salem, NC
August 26*; 7:00 p.m., ESPN+		at VCU	W 2–0	3–0–0	Sports Backers Stadium (323); Richmond, VA
August 29*; 1:00 p.m., ACCNX		Youngstown State	W 5–0	4–0–0	Spry Stadium (330); Winston-Salem, NC
September 2*; 7:00 p.m., ACCNX		Loyola (MD)	W 3–0	5–0–0	Spry Stadium (315); Winston-Salem, NC
September 5*; 6:00 p.m., ESPN+		at Appalachian State	W 2–0	6–0–0	ASU Soccer Stadium (617); Boone, NC
September 9*; 7:00 p.m., ACCNX		Coastal Carolina	W 5–0	7–0–0	Spry Stadium (739); Winston-Salem, NC
September 12*; 1:00 p.m., ACCNX		Maryland	W 2–0	8–0–0	Spry Stadium (803); Winston-Salem, NC
ACC Regular Season
September 17; 5:00 p.m., ACCNX		No. 7 Virginia	L 0–1	8–1–0 (0–1–0)	Spry Stadium (1,487); Winston-Salem, NC
September 23; 7:00 p.m., ACCNX		at Boston College	W 1–0	9–1–0 (1–1–0)	Newton Campus Soccer Field (103); Chestnut Hill, MA
September 26; 1:00 p.m., ACCNX		at Syracuse	W 2–0	10–1–0 (2–1–0)	SU Soccer Stadium (34); Syracuse, NY
October 2; 7:00 p.m., ACCNX		at Louisville	L 1–2 ^{OT}	10–2–0 (2–2–0)	Lynn Stadium (397); Louisville, KY
October 7; 5:00 p.m., ACCRSN		Miami (FL)	W 2–1 ^{2OT}	11–2–0 (3–2–0)	Spry Stadium (444); Winston-Salem, NC
October 10; 5:00 p.m., ACCN		No. 17 Virginia Tech	W 4–3	12–2–0 (4–2–0)	Spry Stadium (601); Winston-Salem, NC
October 15; 7:00 p.m., ACCNX		No. 8 Duke	L 0–2	12–3–0 (4–3–0)	Spry Stadium (1,152); Winston-Salem, NC
October 21; 7:00 p.m., ACCNX		NC State	W 1–0	13–3–0 (5–3–0)	Spry Stadium (772); Winston-Salem, NC
October 24; 1:00 p.m., ACCNX		at Pittsburgh	W 2–1	14–3–0 (6–3–0)	Ambrose Urbanic Field (674); Pittsburgh, PA
October 28; 7:00 p.m., ACCNX		at No. 22 Notre Dame	L 1–2	14–4–0 (6–4–0)	Alumni Stadium (277); Notre Dame, IN
ACC Tournament
October 31; 8:00 p.m., ACCN	(6)	at (3) No. 2 Duke; First Round	W 2–1	15–4–0	Koskinen Stadium (532); Durham, NC
November 5; 8:00 p.m., ACCN	(6) No. 25	vs. (2) No. 2 Florida State; Semifinals	L 1–2 ^{OT}	15–5–0	WakeMed Soccer Park (754); Cary, North Carolina
NCAA Tournament
November 14*; 1:00 p.m., ACCNX		Harvard; First Round	W 3–0	16–5–0	Spry Stadium (1,213); Winston-Salem, NC
November 19*; 5:00 p.m., B1G+		at Michigan; Second Round	L 0–2	16–6–0	U-M Soccer Stadium (1,390); Ann Arbor, MI
*Non-conference game. ^{#}Rankings from United Soccer Coaches. (#) Tournament seedings in parentheses.

== Rankings ==
Ranking movements Legend: ██ Increase in ranking ██ Decrease in ranking — = Not ranked RV = Received votes
	Week																	
Poll	Pre	1	2	3	4	5	6	7	8	9	10	11	12	13	14	15	16	Final
United Soccer	—	—	—	—	—	—	RV	—	—	RV	RV	25	RV	Not released				25
TopDrawer Soccer	—	—	—	—	—	—	—	—	—	23	—	—	—	—	—	—	—	—

== 2022 NWSL Draft ==
Player	Team	Round	Pick #	Position
Ryanne Brown	OL Reign	2	21	DF
Jenna Menta	Racing Louisville FC	3	30	FW
