= 2021 Florida State Seminoles women's soccer team =

2021 Florida State Seminoles women's soccer

National Champions ACC Tournament Champions

NCAA Tournament, College Cup
- Conference: Atlantic Coast Conference
- U. Soc. Coaches poll: No. 1
- TopDrawerSoccer.com: No. 1
- Record: 21–1–3 (7–1–2 ACC)
- Head coach: Mark Krikorian (17th season)
- Assistant coaches: Mike Bristol (13th season); Morinao Imaizumi (9th season)
- Home stadium: Seminole Soccer Complex

2021 ACC women's soccer standings
	Conf.						Overall
Team	W		L		T	PCT	W		L		T	PCT
No. 8 Virginia ‍†‍‍^{y}	8	–	0	–	2	.900	18	–	3	–	2	.826
No. 1 Florida State ‍‍‡‍^{y}	7	–	1	–	2	.800	21	–	1	–	3	.900
No. 5 Duke ‍‍‍^{y}	7	–	2	–	1	.750	16	–	4	–	1	.786
No. 16 Notre Dame ‍‍‍^{y}	7	–	3	–	0	.700	14	–	6	–	2	.682
Clemson ‍‍‍^{y}	6	–	3	–	1	.650	12	–	7	–	1	.625
No. 14 North Carolina ‍‍‍^{y}	5	–	2	–	3	.650	12	–	3	–	3	.750
No. 25 Wake Forest ‍‍‍^{y}	6	–	4	–	0	.600	16	–	6	–	0	.727
Virginia Tech ‍‍‍^{y}	5	–	3	–	2	.600	12	–	6	–	2	.650
Pittsburgh ‍‍‍	4	–	6	–	0	.400	11	–	7	–	0	.611
NC State ‍‍‍^{y}	4	–	6	–	0	.400	9	–	9	–	2	.500
Louisville ‍‍‍	3	–	6	–	1	.350	7	–	7	–	2	.500
Boston College ‍‍‍	1	–	9	–	0	.100	7	–	10	–	1	.417
Miami (FL) ‍‍‍	1	–	9	–	0	.100	4	–	12	–	0	.250
Syracuse ‍‍‍	0	–	10	–	0	.000	4	–	12	–	1	.265
† – Conference champion ‡ – 2021 ACC Tournament champion y – Invited to the NCAA Tournament; As of December 7, 2021; Rankings from United Soccer Coaches Poll; Source: The ACC

The 2021 Florida State Seminoles women's soccer team represented Florida State University during the 2021 NCAA Division I women's soccer season. It was the 27th season of the university fielding a program. The Seminoles were led by 17th year head coach Mark Krikorian.

The Seminoles finished the season 21–1–3 and 7–1–2 in ACC play to finish in second place. As the second seed in the ACC Tournament they defeated Wake Forest and Virginia to win the tournament. The win was the program's eight ACC Tournament title. The Seminoles received an automatic bid to the NCAA Tournament and were awarded a number one seed. The Seminoles defeated South Alabama, SMU, Pepperdine, Michigan, and Rutgers on their way to the tournament final. In the final, they defeated BYU in a penalty shoot-out to be crowned National Champions. Following the season, Krikorian resigned as head coach.

== Previous season ==
Due to the COVID-19 pandemic, the ACC played a reduced schedule in 2020 and the NCAA Tournament was postponed to 2021.

The Seminoles finished the fall season 11–0–0, 8–0–0 in ACC play, to finish in first place. As the first seed in the ACC Tournament, they defeated Notre Dame, Duke, and finally North Carolina to claim the championship. The Seminoles did not play any additional games in the spring season and entered the NCAA Tournament as the ACC's automatic qualifier because they won the ACC Tournament. They were selected as the first overall seed in the NCAA Tournament and defeated Milwaukee in the Second Round and Penn State in the Third Round. They advanced past Duke in the Quarterfinals and Virginia in the Semifinals on penalty shootouts. However, their shootout luck ran out in the Finals, where they fell to Santa Clara to finish as runner-up in the tournament. Jaelin Howell went on to win the Herman Trophy.

== Squad ==
=== Roster ===
Note: Flags indicate national team as defined under FIFA eligibility rules; some limited exceptions apply. Players may hold more than one non-FIFA nationality.

No.	Pos.	Nation	Player
1	GK	PUR	Cristina Roque
2	FW	USA	Jenna Nighswonger
3	DF	USA	Alyssa Stadeker
4	FW	USA	Kristina Lynch
6	MF	USA	Jaelin Howell
7	MF	JPN	Ran Iwai
8	FW	USA	Lauren Flynn
9	DF	USA	Taya Hjorth
10	FW	JAM	Jody Brown
11	MF	USA	Kirsten Pavlisko
12	MF	IRL	Heather Payne
13	FW	BER	LeiLanni Nesbeth

No.	Pos.	Nation	Player
15	MF	USA	Kaitlyn Zipay
16	DF	CAN	Gabby Carle
17	MF	ENG	Emma Bissell
18	MF	POR	Maria Alagoa
19	FW	USA	Amelia Horton
21	DF	USA	Gianna Mitchell
22	FW	USA	Megan Morgan
23	GK	USA	Mia Justus
25	MF	USA	Emily Madril
26	DF	USA	Clara Robbins
30	FW	SWE	Beata Olsson
33	MF	CHN	Yujie Zhao

=== Team management ===
Position	Staff
Athletic Director	David Coburn
Head coach	Mark Krikorian
Assistant Coach	Mike Bristol
Assistant Coach	Morinao Imaizumi
Director of Operations	Nathan Minion

== Schedule ==
Date Time, TV	Rank^{#}	Opponent^{#}	Result	Record	Site (Attendance) City, State
Non-conference Regular season
August 19*; 7:00 p.m., ACCNX	No. 1	No. 9 Texas A&M	W 1–0	1–0–0	Seminole Soccer Complex (1,008); Tallahassee, FL
August 22*; 1:00 p.m., ACCNX	No. 1	Alabama	W 4–0	2–0–0	Seminole Soccer Complex (838); Tallahassee, FL
August 26*; 6:00 p.m., ACCNX	No. 1	South Alabama	W 4–0	3–0–0	Seminole Soccer Complex (817); Tallahassee, FL
August 29*; 1:30 p.m., P12N	No. 1	at Colorado	W 2–1	4–0–0	Prentup Field (2,536); Boulder, CO
September 2*; 7:00 p.m., ACCNX	No. 1	Florida; Rivalry	W 5–2	5–0–0	Seminole Soccer Complex (2,552); Tallahassee, FL
September 9*; 7:00 p.m.	No. 1	at Florida Gulf Coast	W 4–0	6–0–0	FGCU Soccer Complex (1,111); Fort Myers, FL
September 12*; 3:00 p.m., ESPNU	No. 1	at No. 10 Auburn	W 2–1	7–0–0	Auburn Soccer Complex (1,043); Auburn, AL
ACC Regular season
September 18; 6:00 p.m., ACCNX	No. 1	Boston College	W 4–1	8–0–0 (1–0–0)	Seminole Soccer Complex (1,387); Tallahassee, FL
September 23; 8:00 p.m., ACCN	No. 1	Pittsburgh	W 5–0	9–0–0 (2–0–0)	Seminole Soccer Complex (1,767); Tallahassee, FL
September 26; 1:00 p.m., ACCNX	No. 1	at Louisville	W 3–0	10–0–0 (3–0–0)	Lynn Stadium (376); Louisville, KY
October 1; 7:00 p.m., ACCNX	No. 1	at Clemson	W 4–1	11–0–0 (4–0–0)	Riggs Field (1,001); Clemson, SC
October 7; 7:00 p.m., ACCNX	No. 1	Syracuse	W 5–0	12–0–0 (5–0–0)	Seminole Soccer Complex (1,464); Tallahassee, FL
October 10; Noon, ACCRSN	No. 1	Miami (FL); Rivalry	W 4–1	13–0–0 (6–0–0)	Seminole Soccer Complex (1,397); Tallahassee, FL
October 15; 5:00 p.m., ACCRSN	No. 1	at Virginia Tech	W 2–0	14–0–0 (7–0–0)	Thompson Field (1,072); Blacksburg, VA
October 21; 8:00 p.m., ACCN	No. 1	at No. 7 North Carolina	T 2–2 ^{2OT}	14–0–1 (7–0–1)	Dorrance Field (1,447); Chapel Hill, NC
October 24; 2:00 p.m., ACCN	No. 1	at No. 6 Duke	L 0–1	14–1–1 (7–1–1)	Koskinen Stadium (1,731); Durham, NC
October 28; 7:00 p.m., ACCN	No. 3	No. 1 Virginia	T 1–1 ^{2OT}	14–1–2 (7–1–2)	Seminole Soccer Complex (2,388); Tallahassee, FL
ACC Tournament
November 5; 8:00 p.m., ACCN	(2) No. 2	vs. (6) No. 25 Wake Forest; Semifinal	W 2–1 ^{OT}	15–1–2	WakeMed Soccer Park (754); Cary, NC
November 7; 1:00 p.m., ESPNU	(2) No. 2	vs. (1) No. 1 Virginia; Final	W 1–0	16–1–2	WakeMed Soccer Park (1,250); Cary, NC
NCAA Tournament
November 12; 6:00 p.m., ACCNX	(1) No. 1	South Alabama; First round	W 3–0	17–1–2	Seminole Soccer Complex (2,125); Tallahassee, FL
November 19; 5:00 p.m., ACCNX	(1) No. 1	No. 25 SMU; Second round	W 5–1	18–1–2	Seminole Soccer Complex (1,504); Tallahassee, FL
November 21; 2:00 p.m., ACCNX	(1) No. 1	(4) No. 19 Pepperdine; Round of 16	W 1–0	19–1–2	Seminole Soccer Complex (1,367); Tallahassee, FL
November 26; 2:00 p.m., ACCNX	(1) No. 1	(2) No. 9 Michigan; Quarterfinal	W 1–0 ^{OT}	20–1–2	Seminole Soccer Complex (2,005); Tallahassee, FL
December 3; 7:00 p.m., ESPNU	(1) No. 1	vs. (1) No. 5 Rutgers; Semifinal	W 1–0	21–1–2	Stevens Stadium; Santa Clara, CA
December 6; 8:00 p.m., ESPNU	(1) No. 1	vs. (4) No. 13 BYU; Final	T 0–0 (4–3 PKs) ^{2OT}	21–1–3	Stevens Stadium; Santa Clara, CA
*Non-conference game. ^{#}Rankings from United Soccer Coaches. (#) Tournament seedings in parentheses. All times are in Eastern.

== Awards and honors ==
Recipient	Award	Date	Ref.
Jaelin Howell	Preseason Hermann Trophy Watchlist	August 19	
Emily Madril	Preseason Hermann Trophy Watchlist	August 19	
Yujie Zhao	Preseason Hermann Trophy Watchlist	August 19	
Jaelin Howell	Preseason All-ACC Team	August 12	
Yujie Zhao	Preseason All-ACC Team	August 12	
Jaelin Howell	ACC Defensive Player of the Week	August 24	
Emily Madril	ACC Defensive Player of the Week	September 14	
Emily Madril	ACC Co-Defensive Player of the Week	September 28	
Beata Olsson	ACC Co-Offensive Player of the Week	October 5	
Emily Madril	ACC Defensive Player of the Year	November 4	
Jaelin Howell	ACC Midfielder of the Year	November 4	
Yujie Zhao	All-ACC First Team	November 4	
Emily Madril	All-ACC First Team	November 4	
Jaelin Howell	All-ACC First Team	November 4	
Gabby Carle	All-ACC Second Team	November 4	
Beata Olsson	All-ACC Second Team	November 4	
Clara Robbins	All-ACC Second Team	November 4	
Jody Brown	All-ACC Third Team	November 4	
Maria Alaoga	ACC All-Freshman Team	November 4	
Mia Justus	ACC All-Freshman Team	November 4	
Clara Robbins	ACC All-Tournament Team	November 7	
Maria Alagoa	ACC All-Tournament Team	November 7	
Lauren Flynn	ACC All-Tournament Team	November 7	
Emily Madril	ACC All-Tournament Team	November 7	
Cristina Roque	ACC All-Tournament Team	November 7	
Clara Robbins	ACC Tournament MVP	November 7	
Jaelin Howell	Herman Trophy semifinalist	November 30	
Emily Madril	Herman Trophy semifinalist	November 30	
Jaelin Howell	United Soccer Coaches All-Atlantic Region Team	November 30	
Beata Olsson	United Soccer Coaches All-Atlantic Region Team	November 30	
Emily Madril	United Soccer Coaches All-Atlantic Region Team	November 30	
Yujie Zhao	United Soccer Coaches All-Atlantic Region Team	November 30	
Jaelin Howell	United Soccer Coaches All-Americans	December 2	
Emily Madril	United Soccer Coaches All-Americans	December 2	
Yujie Zhao	United Soccer Coaches All-Americans	December 2	
Yujie Zhao	College Cup Offensive Most Outstanding Player	December 6	
Cristina Roque	College Cup Defensive Most Outstanding Player	December 6	
Jaelin Howell	Hermann Trophy finalist	December 8	
Jaelin Howell	Hermann Trophy winner MAC Player of the Year; NSCAA Player of the Year	January 7	

== Rankings ==
Ranking movements Legend: ██ Increase in ranking ██ Decrease in ranking ( ) = First-place votes
	Week																
Poll	Pre	1	2	3	4	5	6	7	8	9	10	11	12	13	14	15	Final
United Soccer	1 (11)	1 (26)	1 (32)	1 (29)	1 (32)	1 (33)	1 (33)	1 (29)	1 (31)	1 (31)	3 (5)	2 (2)	1 (29)	Not released			1 (25)
TopDrawer Soccer	2	2	1	1	1	1	1	1	1	1	2	2	1	1	1	1	1

== 2022 NWSL Draft ==
Player	Team	Round	Pick #	Position
Jaelin Howell	Racing Louisville FC	1	2	MF
