= 2021 ACC women's soccer tournament =

Soccer tournament

- Classification: Division I
- Teams: 6
- Matches: 5
- Attendance: 5,491
- Quarterfinals site: Campus Sites
- Semifinals site: WakeMed Soccer Park; Cary, North Carolina
- Finals site: WakeMed Soccer Park; Cary, North Carolina
- Champions: Florida State (8th title)
- Winning coach: Mark Krikorian (8th title)
- MVP: Clara Robbins (Florida State)
- Broadcast: ACCN (Quarterfinals & Semifinals), ESPNU (Final)

2021 ACC women's soccer standings
	Conf.						Overall
Team	W		L		T	PCT	W		L		T	PCT
No. 8 Virginia ‍†‍‍^{y}	8	–	0	–	2	.900	18	–	3	–	2	.826
No. 1 Florida State ‍‍‡‍^{y}	7	–	1	–	2	.800	21	–	1	–	3	.900
No. 5 Duke ‍‍‍^{y}	7	–	2	–	1	.750	16	–	4	–	1	.786
No. 16 Notre Dame ‍‍‍^{y}	7	–	3	–	0	.700	14	–	6	–	2	.682
Clemson ‍‍‍^{y}	6	–	3	–	1	.650	12	–	7	–	1	.625
No. 14 North Carolina ‍‍‍^{y}	5	–	2	–	3	.650	12	–	3	–	3	.750
No. 25 Wake Forest ‍‍‍^{y}	6	–	4	–	0	.600	16	–	6	–	0	.727
Virginia Tech ‍‍‍^{y}	5	–	3	–	2	.600	12	–	6	–	2	.650
Pittsburgh ‍‍‍	4	–	6	–	0	.400	11	–	7	–	0	.611
NC State ‍‍‍^{y}	4	–	6	–	0	.400	9	–	9	–	2	.500
Louisville ‍‍‍	3	–	6	–	1	.350	7	–	7	–	2	.500
Boston College ‍‍‍	1	–	9	–	0	.100	7	–	10	–	1	.417
Miami (FL) ‍‍‍	1	–	9	–	0	.100	4	–	12	–	0	.250
Syracuse ‍‍‍	0	–	10	–	0	.000	4	–	12	–	1	.265
† – Conference champion ‡ – 2021 ACC Tournament champion y – Invited to the NCAA Tournament; As of December 7, 2021; Rankings from United Soccer Coaches Poll; Source: The ACC

The 2021 Atlantic Coast Conference women's soccer tournament was the 34th edition of the ACC Women's Soccer Tournament, which decided the Atlantic Coast Conference champion. Florida State was the defending champion.

The first round will be played at campus sites, while the semifinals and final will be played at WakeMed Soccer Park in Cary, NC.

Florida State successfully defended their title by defeating Wake Forest in the Semifinals and Virginia in the Final. Clara Robbins of Florida State was named the tournament MVP for the second year in a row. This was Florida State's eighth ACC Tournament title, and coach Mark Krikorian's eighth title.

As tournament champions, Florida State earned the ACC's automatic berth into the 2021 NCAA Division I Women's Soccer Tournament.

== Qualification ==
The top six teams in the Atlantic Coast Conference will earn a berth into the ACC Tournament. The top two teams will earn a bye to the semifinals. Wake Forest and North Carolina ended the season tied in the standings with 18 points. However, Wake Forest won the tiebreaker for the 6th seed, which was determined by the most wins in overall conference games among common opponents.

Seed	School	Conference Record	Points
1	Virginia	8–0–2	26
2	Florida State	7–1–2	23
3	Duke	7–2–1	22
4	Notre Dame	7–3	21
5	Clemson	6–3–1	19
6	Wake Forest	6–4	18

== Bracket ==
First Round; October 31
4	Notre Dame	2
5	Clemson	3
3	Duke	1
6	Wake Forest	2

Semifinal; November 5
1	Virginia	1
5	Clemson	0
2	Florida State (a.e.t.)	2
6	Wake Forest	1

Championship; November 7
1	Virginia	0
2	Florida State	1

== Schedule ==
=== First round ===
October 31, 2021	#4 Notre Dame	2–3	#5 Clemson	Notre Dame, Indiana
6:00 p.m. EDT	Korbin Albert 35'; Sammi Fisher 80' (pen.)	Box Score	11', (yellow card) 90' Caroline Conti; 24', (yellow card) 80' Megan Bornkamp; 57' Makenna Morris	Stadium: Alumni Stadium; Attendance: 268; Referee: Nicholas Balcer; Assistant referees: Jeff Swartzel; Peter Carpentier; Fourth official: Frank Pizana

October 31, 2021	#3 Duke	1–2	#6 Wake Forest	Durham, North Carolina
8:00 p.m. EDT	Katie Groff (yellow card) 19'; Michelle Cooper (yellow card) 55'; Olivia Migli 83'	Box Score	(yellow card) 5' Kristin Johnson; (yellow card) 9' Malaika Meena; 28' Jenna Menta; (yellow card) 31' Zara Chavoshi; 83' (o.g.) Duke Own Goal	Stadium: Koskinen Stadium; Attendance: 532; Referee: Andrea Pireli; Assistant referees: Kevin Maurer; Benjamin Wooten; Fourth official: Abbas Piran

=== Semifinals ===
November 5, 2021	#1 Virginia	1–0	#5 Clemson	Cary, North Carolina
5:30 p.m. EDT	Diana Ordóñez 48'	Report		Stadium: WakeMed Soccer Park; Attendance: 2,687; Referee: Erika Barahona; Assistant referees: Katie Mitchell-Moreno; Katherine McCormick

November 5, 2021	#2 Florida State	2–1 (a.e.t.)	#6 Wake Forest	Cary, North Carolina
8:00 p.m. EDT	Lauren Flynn 42'; Jaelin Howell (yellow card) 94'; Maria Alagoa 97'	Report	31' Sofia Rossi; (yellow card) 43' Zara Chavoshi; (yellow card) 48' Nikayla Small; (yellow card) 69' Hulda Arnarsdottir	Stadium: WakeMed Soccer Park; Attendance: 754; Referee: Kevin Maurer; Assistant referees: Patrick Schmidt; Aaron Gallagher

=== Final ===
November 7, 2021	#1 Virginia	0–1	#2 Florida State	Cary, North Carolina
1:00 p.m. EDT		Report	10', (yellow card) 89' Clara Robbins	Stadium: WakeMed Soccer Park; Attendance: 1,250; Referee: Carmen Serbio; Assistant referees: Scott Bowers; Katherin McCormick; Fourth official: David McPhun

== Statistics ==
=== Goalscorers ===
There were 13 goals scored in 5 matches, for an average of 2.6 goals per match.

1 goal

- (United States) Megan Bornkamp – Clemson
- (United States) Caroline Conti – Clemson
- (United States) Makenna Morris – Clemson
- (United States) Olivia Migli – Duke
- (Portugal) Maria Alagoa – Florida State
- (United States) Lauren Flynn – Florida State
- (United States) Clara Robbins – Florida State
- (United States) Korbin Albert – Notre Dame
- (El Salvador) Sammi Fisher – Notre Dame
- (Mexico) Diana Ordóñez – Virginia
- (United States) Jenna Menta – Wake Forest
- (United States) Sofia Rossi – Wake Forest

1 own goal

- Duke (against Wake Forest)

== All-Tournament team ==
Player	Team
**Clara Robbins**	Florida State
Maria Alagoa	Florida State
Lauren Flynn	Florida State
Emily Madril	Florida State
Cristina Roque	Florida State
Haley Hopkins	Virginia
Diana Ordóñez	Virginia
Alexa Spaanstra	Virginia
Talia Staude	Virginia
Megan Bornkamp	Clemson
Jenna Menta	Wake Forest

MVP in bold
