= 2021 Clemson Tigers women's soccer team =

American college soccer season

2021 Clemson Tigers women's soccer

NCAA Tournament, First Round
- Conference: Atlantic Coast Conference
- U. Soc. Coaches poll: No. RV
- Record: 12–7–1 (6–3–1 ACC)
- Head coach: Eddie Radwanski (11th season)
- Assistant coaches: Jeff Robbins (11th season); Siri Mullinix (11th season)
- Home stadium: Riggs Field

2021 ACC women's soccer standings
	Conf.						Overall
Team	W		L		T	PCT	W		L		T	PCT
No. 8 Virginia ‍†‍‍^{y}	8	–	0	–	2	.900	18	–	3	–	2	.826
No. 1 Florida State ‍‍‡‍^{y}	7	–	1	–	2	.800	21	–	1	–	3	.900
No. 5 Duke ‍‍‍^{y}	7	–	2	–	1	.750	16	–	4	–	1	.786
No. 16 Notre Dame ‍‍‍^{y}	7	–	3	–	0	.700	14	–	6	–	2	.682
Clemson ‍‍‍^{y}	6	–	3	–	1	.650	12	–	7	–	1	.625
No. 14 North Carolina ‍‍‍^{y}	5	–	2	–	3	.650	12	–	3	–	3	.750
No. 25 Wake Forest ‍‍‍^{y}	6	–	4	–	0	.600	16	–	6	–	0	.727
Virginia Tech ‍‍‍^{y}	5	–	3	–	2	.600	12	–	6	–	2	.650
Pittsburgh ‍‍‍	4	–	6	–	0	.400	11	–	7	–	0	.611
NC State ‍‍‍^{y}	4	–	6	–	0	.400	9	–	9	–	2	.500
Louisville ‍‍‍	3	–	6	–	1	.350	7	–	7	–	2	.500
Boston College ‍‍‍	1	–	9	–	0	.100	7	–	10	–	1	.417
Miami (FL) ‍‍‍	1	–	9	–	0	.100	4	–	12	–	0	.250
Syracuse ‍‍‍	0	–	10	–	0	.000	4	–	12	–	1	.265
† – Conference champion ‡ – 2021 ACC Tournament champion y – Invited to the NCAA Tournament; As of December 7, 2021; Rankings from United Soccer Coaches Poll; Source: The ACC

The 2021 Clemson Tigers women's soccer team represented Clemson University during the 2021 NCAA Division I women's soccer season. The Tigers were led by head coach Ed Radwanski, in his eleventh season. The Tigers home games were played at Riggs Field. This was the team's 28th season playing organized soccer. All of those seasons were played in the Atlantic Coast Conference.

The Tigers finished the season 12–7–1 and 6–3–1 in ACC play to finish in fifth place. As the fifth seed in the ACC Tournament, they defeated Notre Dame before falling to Virginia in the Semifinals. They earned an at-large bid to the NCAA Tournament, where they lost to Alabama in the First Round to end their season.

== Previous season ==
Due to the COVID-19 pandemic, the ACC played a reduced schedule in 2020 and the NCAA Tournament was postponed to 2021. The ACC did not play a spring league schedule, but did allow teams to play non-conference games that would count toward their 2020 record in the lead up to the NCAA Tournament.

The Tigers finished the fall season 6–4–0, 5–3–0 in ACC play to finish in fourth place. As the fourth seed in the ACC Tournament, they lost to Duke 1–0 in the Quarterfinals. The Tigers finished the spring season 6–0–0 and received an at-large bid as the fourteenth seed in the NCAA Tournament. They defeated Rutgers and UCLA on penalties before losing to the eventual champions Santa Clara in the Quarterfinals to end their season.

== Offseason ==
=== Departures ===
Departures
Name	Number	Pos.	Height	Year	Hometown	Reason for Departure
Audrey Viso	9	MF	5'5"	Senior	Baton Rouge, Louisiana	Graduated, Transferred to Appalachian State
Kimber Haley	11	MF	5'3"	Senior	Fort Mill, SC	Graduated
Madi Reid	12	DF	—	Freshman	Cary, NC	Transferred to NC State
Abigail Mitchell	14	DF	5'6"	Senior	Alpharetta, GA	Graduated
Mariana Speckmaier	17	FW	5'5"	Senior	Miami, FL	Graduated; Drafted 39th overall in the NWSL Draft by the Washington Spirit
Lauren Bruns	22	FW	5'5"	Sophomore	Richmond, VA	—
Olivia Bonacorso	25	DF	5'3"	Junior	Middleton, MA	—

=== Recruiting class ===
Name	Nationality	Hometown	Club	TDS Rating
Mackenzie Duff; DF	USA	St. Louis, MO	SLSG – Missouri	2/5 stars
Ella Hauser; MF	USA	Corenlius, NC	Charlotte Soccer Academy	2/5 stars
Emma Lerner; MF	USA	Mentor, OH	Internationals SC (Ohio)	2/5 stars
Renee Lyles; FW	USA	Atlanta, GA	Concorde Fire	4/5 stars
Alexandra Lynch; GK	USA	Los Angeles, CA	Real So Cal	3/5 stars
Sydney Minarik; FW	USA	Huntersville, NC	Charlotte Soccer Academy	3/5 stars
Layne St. George; DF	USA	Seattle, WA	Seattle Reign Academy	4/5 stars

== Squad ==
=== Roster ===
As of January 7, 2022

Note: Flags indicate national team as defined under FIFA eligibility rules; some limited exceptions apply. Players may hold more than one non-FIFA nationality.

No.	Pos.	Nation	Player
1	GK	USA	Halle Mackiewicz
2	DF	USA	Makenna Morris
3	DF	USA	Layne St. George
4	DF	USA	Harper White
5	MF	USA	Grace Wagner
6	MF	USA	Devi Dudley
7	DF	USA	Sydney Dawson
8	DF	ENG	Caitlin Smith
9	DF	USA	Mackenzie Duff
10	FW	USA	Renee Lyles
11	MF	USA	Cassidy Lindley
12	FW	USA	Sydney Minarik
14	FW	ENG	Fran Stables

No.	Pos.	Nation	Player
15	MF	USA	Hal Hershfelt
16	MF	USA	Ella Hauser
17	MF	USA	Emma Lerner
19	DF	USA	Renee Guion
20	FW	USA	Courtney Jones
21	FW	USA	Maliah Morris
23	FW	USA	Caroline Conti
24	MF	USA	Megan Bornkamp
28	DF	USA	Abby Hanks
29	FW	USA	Sami Meredith
34	GK	USA	Ally Lynch
38	DF	USA	Jackson Moehler
51	GK	USA	Hensley Hancuff

== Team management ==
Position	Staff
Athletic Director	(United States) Dan Radakovich
Head coach	(United States) Eddie Radwanski
Associate head coach	(United States) Jeff Robbins
Assistant Coach	(United States) Siri Mullinix
Director of Operations	(United States) Julie Carson

== Schedule ==
Date Time, TV	Rank^{#}	Opponent^{#}	Result	Record	Site City, State
Exhibition
August 9*; 6:00 p.m.	No. 7	at Wake Forest	T 2–2	–	Spry Stadium; Winston-Salem, NC
August 13*; 6:00 p.m.	No. 7	No. 6 Duke	L 1–3	–	Riggs Field; Clemson, SC
Non-conference regular season
August 19*; 7:00 p.m., ACCNX	No. 7	Saint Francis	W 8–0	1–0–0	Riggs Field (472); Clemson, SC
August 22*; 7:00 p.m., ACCNX	No. 7	Loyola (MD)	W 4–0	2–0–0	Riggs Field (0); Clemson, SC
August 28*; 8:00 p.m., SECN+	No. 9	at No. 21 Texas A&M	L 1–3	2–1–0	Ellis Field (4,330); College Station, TX
September 2*; 7:00 p.m., SECN+	No. 15	at Georgia	L 1–3	2–2–0	Turner Soccer Complex (647); Athens, GA
September 5*; 2:00 p.m., ACCNX	No. 15	College of Charleston	W 8–0	3–2–0	Riggs Field (355); Clemson, SC
September 9*; 7:00 p.m., ACCN		No. 12 South Carolina; Rivalry	W 2–1	4–2–0	Riggs Field (557); Clemson, SC
September 12*; 6:00 p.m., ESPN+		at Gardner–Webb	W 4–0	5–2–0	Greene–Harbison Stadium (750); Boiling Springs, NC
ACC Regular Season
September 16; 7:00 p.m., ACCN		No. 19 Pittsburgh	W 2–0	6–2–0 (1–0–0)	Riggs Field (329); Clemson, SC
September 23; 7:00 p.m., ACCNX	No. 22	at NC State	W 2–1	7–2–0 (2–0–0)	Dail Soccer Field (647); Raleigh, NC
September 26; 1:00 p.m., ACCNX	No. 22	at No. 4 North Carolina	L 0–3	7–3–0 (2–1–0)	Dorrance Field (1,885); Chapel Hill, NC
October 1; 7:00 p.m., ACCNX		No. 1 Florida State	L 1–4	7–4–0 (2–2–0)	Riggs Field (1,001); Clemson, SC
October 7; 7:00 p.m., ACCN		No. 17 Virginia Tech	W 1–0	8–4–0 (3–2–0)	Riggs Field (152); Clemson, SC
October 10; 3:00 p.m., ACCNX		at No. 24 Notre Dame	L 1–2 ^{2OT}	8–5–0 (3–3–0)	Alumni Stadium (597); Notre Dame, IN
October 16; 7:00 p.m., ACCNX		at Miami	W 1–0	9–5–0 (4–3–0)	Cobb Stadium (302); Coral Gables, FL
October 21; 7:00 p.m., ACCNX		Syracuse	W 8–0	10–5–0 (5–3–0)	Riggs Field (371); Clemson, SC
October 24; 1:00 p.m., ACCNX		Louisville	T 1–1 ^{2OT}	10–5–1 (5–3–1)	Riggs Field (284); Clemson, SC
October 28; 5:00 p.m., ACCNX		at Boston College	W 4–1	11–5–1 (6–3–1)	Newton Campus Soccer Field (230); Chestnut Hill, MA
ACC Tournament
October 31; 6:00 p.m., ACCN	(5)	at (4) No. 22 Notre Dame; First Round	W 3–2	12–5–1	Alumni Stadium (268); Notre Dame, IN
November 5; 5:30 p.m., ACCN	(5) No. 24	vs. (1) No. 1 Virginia; Semifinals	L 0–1	12–6–1	WakeMed Soccer Park (2,687); Cary, NC
NCAA Tournament
November 12; 4:00 p.m.		Alabama; First Round	L 0–1	12–7–1	Riggs Field (527); Clemson, SC
*Non-conference game. ^{#}Rankings from United Soccer Coaches. (#) Tournament seedings in parentheses. All times are in Eastern.

== Goals Record ==
Rank	No.	Nat.	Po.	Name	Regular season	ACC Tournament	NCAA Tournament	Total
1	24	(United States)	MF	Megan Bornkamp	9	1	0	10
2	10	(United States)	FW	Renee Lyles	7	0	0	7
2	15	(United States)	MF	Hal Hershfelt	7	0	0	7
4	2	(United States)	DF	Makenna Morris	5	1	0	6
4	23	(United States)	FW	Caroline Conti	5	1	0	6
6	21	(United States)	FW	Maliah Morris	5	0	0	5
7	4	(United States)	DF	Harper White	2	0	0	2
7	5	(United States)	MF	Grace Wagner	2	0	0	2
7	12	(United States)	FW	Sydney Minarik	2	0	0	2
7	28	(United States)	DF	Abby Hanks	2	0	0	2
11	14	(United States)	FW	Fran Stables	1	0	0	1
11	19	(United States)	DF	Renee Guion	1	0	0	1
Opponent own goal					1	0	0	1
Total					49	3	0	52

== Disciplinary record ==
Rank	No.	Nat.	Po.	Name	Regular Season			ACC Tournament			NCAA Tournament			Total		
Rank	No.	Nat.	Po.	Name	Booked	(yellow card) (yellow-red card)	Sent off (straight red)	Booked	(yellow card) (yellow-red card)	Sent off (straight red)	Booked	(yellow card) (yellow-red card)	Sent off (straight red)	Booked	(yellow card) (yellow-red card)	Sent off (straight red)
1	24	(United States)	MF	Megan Bornkamp	4	0	0	1	0	0	0	0	0	5	0	0
2	10	(United States)	FW	Renee Lyles	1	1	0	0	0	0	0	0	0	1	1	0
2	23	(United States)	FW	Caroline Conti	2	0	0	1	0	0	0	0	0	3	0	0
4	15	(United States)	MF	Hal Hershfelt	2	0	0	0	0	0	0	0	0	2	0	0
5	2	(United States)	DF	Makenna Morris	0	0	0	0	0	0	1	0	0	1	0	0
5	3	(United States)	DF	Layne St. George	1	0	0	0	0	0	0	0	0	1	0	0
5	4	(United States)	DF	Harper White	1	0	0	0	0	0	0	0	0	1	0	0
5	7	(United States)	DF	Sydney Dawson	0	0	0	0	0	0	1	0	0	1	0	0
5	8	(England)	DF	Caitlin Smith	1	0	0	0	0	0	0	0	0	1	0	0
5	12	(United States)	FW	Sydney Minarik	1	0	0	0	0	0	0	0	0	1	0	0
5	28	(England)	DF	Abby Hanks	1	0	0	0	0	0	0	0	0	1	0	0
Total					14	1	0	2	0	0	2	0	0	18	1	0

== Awards and honors ==
Recipient	Award	Date	Ref.
Megan Bornkamp	Preseason All-ACC Team	August 12	
Hensley Hancuff	Preseason All-ACC Team	August 12	
Megan Bornkamp	Preseason Hermann Trophy Watchlist	August 19	
Megan Bornkamp	ACC Offensive Player of the Week	September 14	
Caroline Conti	ACC Offensive Player of the Week	November 2	
Megan Bornkamp	All-ACC First Team	November 4	
Hal Hershfelt	All-ACC Second Team	November 4	
Renee Guion	All-ACC Third Team	November 4	
Hensley Hancuff	All-ACC Third Team	November 4	
Makenna Morris	All-ACC Third Team	November 4	
Renee Lyles	ACC All-Freshman Team	November 4	
Megan Bornkamp	ACC All-Tournament Team	November 7	

== Rankings ==
Ranking movements Legend: ██ Increase in ranking ██ Decrease in ranking — = Not ranked RV = Received votes
	Week																
Poll	Pre	1	2	3	4	5	6	7	8	9	10	11	12	13	14	15	Final
United Soccer	7	9	15	RV	RV	22	RV	RV	RV	RV	RV	24	RV	Not released			RV
TopDrawer Soccer	8	7	10	23	21	16	18	—									

== 2022 NWSL Draft ==
Player	Team	Round	Pick #	Position
Hensley Hancuff	NJ/NY Gotham FC	3	34	GK
