= 2021 Duke Blue Devils women's soccer team =

American college soccer season

2021 Duke Blue Devils women's soccer

NCAA Tournament, Quarterfinals
- Conference: Atlantic Coast Conference
- U. Soc. Coaches poll: No. 5
- TopDrawerSoccer.com: No. 6
- Record: 16–4–1 (7–2–1 ACC)
- Head coach: Robbie Church (21st season)
- Assistant coaches: Kieran Hall (3rd season); Carla Overbeck (28th season); Lane Davis (6th season)
- Home stadium: Koskinen Stadium

2021 ACC women's soccer standings
	Conf.						Overall
Team	W		L		T	PCT	W		L		T	PCT
No. 8 Virginia ‍†‍‍^{y}	8	–	0	–	2	.900	18	–	3	–	2	.826
No. 1 Florida State ‍‍‡‍^{y}	7	–	1	–	2	.800	21	–	1	–	3	.900
No. 5 Duke ‍‍‍^{y}	7	–	2	–	1	.750	16	–	4	–	1	.786
No. 16 Notre Dame ‍‍‍^{y}	7	–	3	–	0	.700	14	–	6	–	2	.682
Clemson ‍‍‍^{y}	6	–	3	–	1	.650	12	–	7	–	1	.625
No. 14 North Carolina ‍‍‍^{y}	5	–	2	–	3	.650	12	–	3	–	3	.750
No. 25 Wake Forest ‍‍‍^{y}	6	–	4	–	0	.600	16	–	6	–	0	.727
Virginia Tech ‍‍‍^{y}	5	–	3	–	2	.600	12	–	6	–	2	.650
Pittsburgh ‍‍‍	4	–	6	–	0	.400	11	–	7	–	0	.611
NC State ‍‍‍^{y}	4	–	6	–	0	.400	9	–	9	–	2	.500
Louisville ‍‍‍	3	–	6	–	1	.350	7	–	7	–	2	.500
Boston College ‍‍‍	1	–	9	–	0	.100	7	–	10	–	1	.417
Miami (FL) ‍‍‍	1	–	9	–	0	.100	4	–	12	–	0	.250
Syracuse ‍‍‍	0	–	10	–	0	.000	4	–	12	–	1	.265
† – Conference champion ‡ – 2021 ACC Tournament champion y – Invited to the NCAA Tournament; As of December 7, 2021; Rankings from United Soccer Coaches Poll; Source: The ACC

The 2021 Duke Blue Devils women's soccer team represented Duke University during the 2021 NCAA Division I women's soccer season. The Blue Devils were led by head coach Robbie Church, in his twenty-first season. They played home games at Koskinen Stadium. This was the team's 34th season playing organized women's college soccer and their 34th playing in the Atlantic Coast Conference.

The Blue Devils finished the season with a 16–4–1 record, 7–2–1 in ACC play to finish in third place. The lost in the First Round of the ACC Tournament. They received an at-large bid to the NCAA Tournament where they were awarded one of the top four seeds. They defeated Old Dominion in the First Round, Memphis in the Second Round, and St. John's in the Round of 16 before losing to Santa Clara in the Semifinals to end their season.

== Previous season ==
Due to the COVID-19 pandemic, the ACC played a reduced schedule in 2020 and the NCAA Tournament was postponed to 2021. The ACC did not play a spring league schedule, but did allow teams to play non-conference games that would count toward their 2020 record in the lead up to the NCAA Tournament.

The Blue Devils finished the fall season 7–4–2, 4–2–2 in ACC play to finish in sixth place. As the fifth seed in the ACC Tournament, they defeated Clemson before losing to eventual champions Florida State in the Semifinals. The Blue Devils finished the spring season 3–1–1 and received an at-large bid to the NCAA Tournament. In the tournament, they defeated Arizona State in the Second Round and Ole Miss in the Third Round before losing to Florida State in the Quarterfinals, on penalties to end their season.

== Squad ==
=== Roster ===
As of September 10, 2021

Note: Flags indicate national team as defined under FIFA eligibility rules; some limited exceptions apply. Players may hold more than one non-FIFA nationality.

No.	Pos.	Nation	Player
1	GK	USA	Maddie Nielsen
3	DF	SEN	Dieynaba Ndaw
4	DF	USA	Baleigh Bruster
5	MF	USA	Sarah Piper
6	DF	USA	Caitlin Cosme
7	MF	USA	Sophie Jones
8	FW	USA	Tess Boade
9	FW	USA	Grace Watkins
10	FW	USA	Olivia Migli
11	MF	USA	Julia Burnell
12	FW	USA	Marykate McGuire
13	FW	USA	Emmy Duerr
14	MF	USA	Julia Hannon

No.	Pos.	Nation	Player
15	DF	USA	Emily Royson
16	MF	USA	Sydney Simmons
17	DF	USA	Nicole Chico
18	FW	USA	Michelle Cooper
19	MF	USA	Maggie Graham
20	DF	USA	Kelly Wilson
21	DF	USA	Katie Groff
22	DF	USA	Delaney Graham
23	GK	USA	Holly Stam
24	MF	USA	Mackenzie Pluck
26	GK	USA	Ruthie Jones
27	DF	USA	Bria Schrotenboer
28	MF	USA	Lily Nabet

=== Team management ===
Position	Staff
Head coach	Robbie Church
Assistant Coach	Kieran Hall
Assistant Coach	Carla Overbeck
Assistant Coach	Lane Davis

== Schedule ==
Date Time, TV	Rank^{#}	Opponent^{#}	Result	Record	Site (Attendance) City, State
Exhibition
August 10*; 6:00 p.m.	No. 6	Georgia	W 2–0	–	Koskinen Stadium; Durham, NC
August 13*; 6:00 p.m.	No. 6	at No. 7 Clemson	W 3–1	–	Riggs Field; Clemson, SC
Non-conference regular season
August 19*; 7:00 p.m., ACCNX	No. 6	No. 13 Arkansas	W 3–1	1–0–0	Koskinen Stadium (589); Durham, NC
August 22*; Noon, ACCNX	No. 6	No. 19 Washington	W 2–1	2–0–0	Koskinen Stadium (447); Durham, NC
August 26*; 7:00 p.m., ACCNX	No. 5	Western Carolina	W 6–0	3–0–0	Koskinen Stadium (560); Durham, NC
August 29*; 3:00 p.m., SECN+	No. 5	at Vanderbilt	W 2–0	4–0–0	Vanderbilt Soccer Complex (572); Nashville, TN
September 2*; 7:00 p.m., ACCNX	No. 5	No. 10 Stanford	W 2–1	5–0–0	Koskinen Stadium (1,189); Durham, NC
September 9*; 7:00 p.m., ACCNX	No. 5	East Carolina	W 5–0	6–0–0	Koskinen Stadium (603); Durham, NC
ACC regular season
September 17; 7:00 p.m., ACCNX	No. 4	at No. 2 North Carolina; Rivalry	W 1–0	7–0–0 (1–0–0)	Dorrance Field (5,301); Chapel Hill, NC
September 23; 7:00 p.m., ACCNX	No. 2	at No. 7 Virginia	L 0–1	7–1–0 (1–1–0)	Klöckner Stadium (1,911); Charlottesville, VA
September 26; 5:00 p.m., ACCN	No. 2	at Virginia Tech	T 1–1 ^{2OT}	7–1–1 (1–1–1)	Thompson Field (923); Blacksburg, VA
October 2; 7:00 p.m., ACCNX	No. 4	Syracuse	W 2–0	8–1–1 (2–1–1)	Koskinen Stadium (784); Durham, NC
October 7; 6:00 p.m., ACCN	No. 4	NC State	L 1–2 ^{2OT}	8–2–1 (2–2–1)	Koskinen Stadium (626); Durham, NC
October 10; 2:00 p.m., ACCNX	No. 4	Pittsburgh	W 5–0	9–2–1 (3–2–1)	Koskinen Stadium (555); Durham, NC
October 15; 7:00 p.m., ACCNX	No. 8	at Wake Forest	W 2–0	10–2–1 (4–2–1)	Spry Stadium (1,152); Winston-Salem, NC
October 21; 7:00 p.m., ACCNX	No. 6	No. 15 Notre Dame	W 1–0 ^{OT}	11–2–1 (5–2–1)	Koskinen Stadium (704); Durham, NC
October 24; 2:00 p.m., ACCN	No. 6	No. 1 Florida State	W 1–0	12–2–1 (6–2–1)	Koskinen Stadium (1,731); Durham, NC
October 28; 5:00 p.m., ACCN	No. 2	at Louisville	W 1–0	13–2–1 (7–2–1)	Lynn Stadium (304); Louisville, KY
ACC tournament
October 31; 8:00 p.m., ACCN	(3) No. 2	(6) Wake Forest; First Round	L 1–2	13–3–1	Koskinen Stadium (532); Durham, NC
NCAA tournament
November 12; 6:00 p.m.	(1) No. 4	Old Dominion; First Round	W 1–0	14–3–1	Koskinen Stadium (937); Durham, NC
November 19; 6:30 p.m., ACCNX	(1) No. 4	No. 18 Memphis; Second Round	W 1–0	15–3–1	Koskinen Stadium (3,595); Durham, NC
November 21; 6:00 p.m.	(1) No. 4	St. John's; Round of 16	W 7–1	16–3–1	Koskinen Stadium (1,014); Durham, NC
November 26; 6:00 p.m., ACCNX	(1) No. 4	No. 12 Santa Clara; Quarterfinals	L 1–2	16–4–1	Koskinen Stadium (1,031); Durham, NC
*Non-conference game. ^{#}Rankings from United Soccer Coaches. (#) Tournament seedings in parentheses. All times are in Eastern.

== Awards and honors ==
Recipient	Award	Date	Ref.
Delaney Graham	Preseason All-ACC Team	August 12	
Sophie Jones	Preseason All-ACC Team	August 12	
Sophie Jones	Preseason Hermann Trophy Watchlist	August 19	
Tess Boade	ACC Offensive Player of the Week	September 21	
Ruthie Jones	ACC Defensive Player of the Week	September 21	
Tess Boade	ACC Co-Offensive Player of the Week	October 26	
Emily Royson	ACC Defensive Player of the Week	October 26	
Michelle Cooper	ACC Freshman of the Year	November 4	
Tess Boade	All-ACC First Team	November 4	
Michelle Cooper	All-ACC First Team	November 4	
Ruthie Jones	All-ACC First Team	November 4	
Sophie Jones	All-ACC Second Team	November 4	
Michelle Cooper	ACC All-Freshman Team	November 4	

== Rankings ==
Ranking movements Legend: ██ Increase in ranking ██ Decrease in ranking ( ) = First-place votes
	Week																
Poll	Pre	1	2	3	4	5	6	7	8	9	10	11	12	13	14	15	Final
United Soccer	6	5	5	5	4	2	4	4	8	6	2 (2)	6	4	Not released			5
TopDrawer Soccer	7	6	6	5	4	3	6	6	12	10	8	11	12	9	4	6	6

== 2022 NWSL Draft ==
Player	Team	Round	Pick #	Position
Caitlin Cosme	Orlando Pride	1	10	DF
Lily Nabet	Angel City FC	3	36	MF
