= 2021 Miami Hurricanes women's soccer team =

Soccer team representing the University of Miami

2021 Miami Hurricanes women's soccer
- Conference: Atlantic Coast Conference
- Record: 4–12–0 (1–9–0 ACC)
- Head coach: Sarah Barnes (4th season)
- Assistant coaches: Alan Fread (4th season); Jeremy Williams (4th season)
- Home stadium: Cobb Stadium

2021 ACC women's soccer standings
	Conf.						Overall
Team	W		L		T	PCT	W		L		T	PCT
No. 8 Virginia ‍†‍‍^{y}	8	–	0	–	2	.900	18	–	3	–	2	.826
No. 1 Florida State ‍‍‡‍^{y}	7	–	1	–	2	.800	21	–	1	–	3	.900
No. 5 Duke ‍‍‍^{y}	7	–	2	–	1	.750	16	–	4	–	1	.786
No. 16 Notre Dame ‍‍‍^{y}	7	–	3	–	0	.700	14	–	6	–	2	.682
Clemson ‍‍‍^{y}	6	–	3	–	1	.650	12	–	7	–	1	.625
No. 14 North Carolina ‍‍‍^{y}	5	–	2	–	3	.650	12	–	3	–	3	.750
No. 25 Wake Forest ‍‍‍^{y}	6	–	4	–	0	.600	16	–	6	–	0	.727
Virginia Tech ‍‍‍^{y}	5	–	3	–	2	.600	12	–	6	–	2	.650
Pittsburgh ‍‍‍	4	–	6	–	0	.400	11	–	7	–	0	.611
NC State ‍‍‍^{y}	4	–	6	–	0	.400	9	–	9	–	2	.500
Louisville ‍‍‍	3	–	6	–	1	.350	7	–	7	–	2	.500
Boston College ‍‍‍	1	–	9	–	0	.100	7	–	10	–	1	.417
Miami (FL) ‍‍‍	1	–	9	–	0	.100	4	–	12	–	0	.250
Syracuse ‍‍‍	0	–	10	–	0	.000	4	–	12	–	1	.265
† – Conference champion ‡ – 2021 ACC Tournament champion y – Invited to the NCAA Tournament; As of December 7, 2021; Rankings from United Soccer Coaches Poll; Source: The ACC

The 2021 Miami Hurricanes women's soccer team represented University of Miami during the 2021 NCAA Division I women's soccer season. The Hurricanes were led by head coach Sarah Barnes, in her fourth season. They played home games at Cobb Stadium. This is the team's 23rd season playing organized women's college soccer and their 18th playing in the Atlantic Coast Conference.

The Hurricanes finished the season 4–12–0 overall, and 1–9–0 in ACC play to finish in a tie for twelfth place. They did not qualify for the ACC Tournament and were not invited to the NCAA Tournament.

== Previous season ==
Due to the COVID-19 pandemic, the ACC played a reduced schedule in 2020 and the NCAA Tournament was postponed to 2021. The ACC did not play a spring league schedule, but did allow teams to play non-conference games that would count toward their 2020 record in the lead up to the NCAA Tournament.

The Hurricanes finished the fall season 0–8–0, 0–8–0 in ACC play to finish in a thirteenth place. They did not qualify for the ACC Tournament. They finished the spring season 1–2–1 and were not invited to the NCAA Tournament.

== Squad ==
=== Roster ===
As of March 28, 2022

Note: Flags indicate national team as defined under FIFA eligibility rules; some limited exceptions apply. Players may hold more than one non-FIFA nationality.

No.	Pos.	Nation	Player
0	GK	CAN	Melissa Dagenais
1	GK	USA	Tyler Speaks
2	DF	USA	Adrianna Serna
3	FW	USA	Mia Atrio
4	MF	SWE	Johanna Barth
5	MF	USA	Claire Llewellyn
6	FW	USA	Gabriela Rusek
8	FW	ISL	Gudrun Haralz
10	MF	USA	Julia Edwards
13	MF	USA	Katerina Molina
14	DF	USA	Selena Fortich
15	DF	USA	Hanna Dawbarn
16	FW	USA	Jackie Koerwitz

No.	Pos.	Nation	Player
17	MF	ISL	María Jakobsdóttir
19	DF	USA	Delaney Brown
20	MF	USA	Michaela Baker
21	MF	USA	Lauren Meeks
22	FW	USA	Taylor Shell
23	MF	USA	Jordan Felton
24	FW	CAN	Mikayla Tupper
25	MF	CAN	May Rogers
26	MF	USA	Emma Tucker
27	GK	USA	Skylah Klein
28	MF	USA	Annie Blair
29	DF	USA	Hallie Salas
31	FW	USA	Jaclyn Marra

=== Team management ===
Position	Staff
Head coach	Sarah Barnes
Assistant Coach	Jeremy Williams
Assistant Coach	Alan Fread
Director of Operations	Nicholas Petrucelli

== Schedule ==
Date Time, TV	Rank^{#}	Opponent^{#}	Result	Record	Site (Attendance) City, State
Exhibition
August 10*; 6:00 p.m.		Florida Gulf Coast	T 2–2	–	Cobb Stadium; Coral Gables, FL
August 14*; 10:00 a.m.		UCF	L 0–2	–	Cobb Stadium; Coral Gables, FL
August 19*; 7:00 p.m.		at Barry	W 1–0	–	Buccaneer Soccer Field; Miami, FL
Non-conference regular season
August 22*; 6:00 p.m.		FAU	W 1–0	1–0–0	Cobb Stadium (252); Coral Gables, FL
August 26*; 7:00 p.m.		Lipscomb	L 0–2	1–1–0	Cobb Stadium (127); Coral Gables, FL
August 29*; 1:00 p.m.		at Florida	W 1–0 ^{OT}	2–1–0	Pressly Stadium (511); Gainesville, FL
September 2*; 7:00 p.m.		at Missouri	L 0–1 ^{OT}	2–2–0	Walton Stadium (437); Columbia, MO
September 9*; 7:00 p.m.		FIU	W 3–0	3–2–0	Cobb Stadium (372); Coral Gables, FL
September 12*; 2:00 p.m.		USF	L 0–1	3–3–0	Cobb Stadium (147); Coral Gables, FL
ACC regular season
September 17; 7:00 p.m.		Louisville	L 2–3 ^{2OT}	3–4–0 (0–1–0)	Cobb Stadium (154); Coral Gables, FL
September 23; 5:00 p.m.		Notre Dame	L 0–5	3–5–0 (0–2–0)	Cobb Stadium (162); Coral Gables, FL
September 26; 3:00 p.m.		Pittsburgh	L 0–2	3–6–0 (0–3–0)	Cobb Stadium (263); Coral Gables, FL
October 2; 7:00 p.m.		at Boston College	W 1–0	4–6–0 (1–3–0)	Newton Campus Soccer Field (529); Chestnut Hill, MA
October 7; 5:00 p.m.		at Wake Forest	L 1–2 ^{2OT}	4–7–0 (1–4–0)	Spry Stadium (444); Winston-Salem, NC
October 10; Noon		at No. 1 Florida State; Rivalry	L 1–4	4–8–0 (1–5–0)	Seminole Soccer Complex (1,397); Tallahassee, FL
October 16; 7:00 p.m.		Clemson	L 0–1	4–9–0 (1–6–0)	Cobb Stadium (302); Coral Gables, FL
October 21; 7:00 p.m.		at Virginia Tech	L 0–5	4–10–0 (1–7–0)	Thompson Field (520); Blacksburg, VA
October 24; 3:00 p.m.		at No. 2 Virginia	L 6–1	4–11–0 (1–8–0)	Klöckner Stadium (2,396); Charlottesville, VA
October 28; 7:00 p.m.		No. 7 North Carolina	L 0–4	4–12–0 (1–9–0)	Cobb Stadium (706); Coral Gables, FL
*Non-conference game. ^{#}Rankings from United Soccer Coaches. (#) Tournament seedings in parentheses.

== Rankings ==
Ranking movements Legend: — = Not ranked
	Week																
Poll	Pre	1	2	3	4	5	6	7	8	9	10	11	12	13	14	15	Final
United Soccer														Not released			—
TopDrawer Soccer																	
