= 2021 Syracuse Orange women's soccer team =

American college soccer season

2021 Syracuse Orange women's soccer
- Conference: Atlantic Coast Conference
- Record: 4–12–1 (0–10–0 ACC)
- Head coach: Nicky Adams (3rd season)
- Assistant coaches: Kelly Madsen (3rd season); Brandon Denoyer (2nd season)
- Home stadium: SU Soccer Stadium

2021 ACC women's soccer standings
	Conf.						Overall
Team	W		L		T	PCT	W		L		T	PCT
No. 8 Virginia ‍†‍‍^{y}	8	–	0	–	2	.900	18	–	3	–	2	.826
No. 1 Florida State ‍‍‡‍^{y}	7	–	1	–	2	.800	21	–	1	–	3	.900
No. 5 Duke ‍‍‍^{y}	7	–	2	–	1	.750	16	–	4	–	1	.786
No. 16 Notre Dame ‍‍‍^{y}	7	–	3	–	0	.700	14	–	6	–	2	.682
Clemson ‍‍‍^{y}	6	–	3	–	1	.650	12	–	7	–	1	.625
No. 14 North Carolina ‍‍‍^{y}	5	–	2	–	3	.650	12	–	3	–	3	.750
No. 25 Wake Forest ‍‍‍^{y}	6	–	4	–	0	.600	16	–	6	–	0	.727
Virginia Tech ‍‍‍^{y}	5	–	3	–	2	.600	12	–	6	–	2	.650
Pittsburgh ‍‍‍	4	–	6	–	0	.400	11	–	7	–	0	.611
NC State ‍‍‍^{y}	4	–	6	–	0	.400	9	–	9	–	2	.500
Louisville ‍‍‍	3	–	6	–	1	.350	7	–	7	–	2	.500
Boston College ‍‍‍	1	–	9	–	0	.100	7	–	10	–	1	.417
Miami (FL) ‍‍‍	1	–	9	–	0	.100	4	–	12	–	0	.250
Syracuse ‍‍‍	0	–	10	–	0	.000	4	–	12	–	1	.265
† – Conference champion ‡ – 2021 ACC Tournament champion y – Invited to the NCAA Tournament; As of December 7, 2021; Rankings from United Soccer Coaches Poll; Source: The ACC

The 2021 Syracuse Orange women's soccer team represented Syracuse University during the 2021 NCAA Division I women's soccer season. The Orange were led by head coach Nicky Adams, in her third season. They played home games at SU Soccer Stadium. This is the team's 25th season playing organized women's college soccer, and their 8th playing in the Atlantic Coast Conference.

The Orange finished the season 4–12–1, 0–10–0 in ACC play to finish in fourteenth place. They did not qualify for the ACC Tournament. They were not invited to the NCAA Tournament.

== Previous season ==
Due to the COVID-19 pandemic, the ACC played a reduced schedule in 2020 and the NCAA Tournament was postponed to 2021. The ACC did not play a spring league schedule, but did allow teams to play non-conference games that would count toward their 2020 record in the lead up to the NCAA Tournament.

The Orange finished the fall season 1–7–0, 1–7–0 in ACC play to finish in a tie for eleventh place. They did not qualify for the ACC Tournament. The Orange did not participate in the spring season and were not invited to the NCAA Tournament.

== Squad ==
=== Roster ===
As of December 13, 2021

Note: Flags indicate national team as defined under FIFA eligibility rules; some limited exceptions apply. Players may hold more than one non-FIFA nationality.

No.	Pos.	Nation	Player
0	GK	USA	Michaela Walsh
1	GK	CAN	Sierra Giorgio
2	MF	USA	Liesel Odden
3	MF	USA	Margaret Thornton
4	FW	USA	Ashley Rauch
5	DF	RUS	Alina Miagkova
6	MF	GER	Pauline Machtens
7	FW	USA	Blue Ellis
8	DF	BEL	Zoe van de Cloot
9	DF	USA	Kendyl Lauher
10	FW	NZL	Hannah Pilley
11	DF	USA	Jenna Tivnan
12	MF	USA	Telly Vunipola

No.	Pos.	Nation	Player
14	DF	USA	Kate Murphy
15	DF	USA	Natalie Weidenbach
16	MF	USA	Koby Commandant
17	DF	CAN	Kylen Grant
18	FW	USA	Aysia Cobb
19	FW	USA	Raia James
20	DF	USA	Emma Klein
21	FW	USA	Chelsea Domond
22	GK	CAN	Lysianne Proulx
23	MF	USA	Chloe Deveze
24	FW	USA	Meghan Root
25	DF	USA	Grace Franklin
26	FW	USA	Erin Flurey

=== Team management ===
Position	Staff
Head coach	Nicky Adams
Assistant Coach	Kelly Madsen
Assistant Coach	Brandon Denoyer

== Schedule ==
Date Time, TV	Rank^{#}	Opponent^{#}	Result	Record	Site (Attendance) City, State
Exhibition
August 10*; 6:00 p.m.		Army	W 1–0	–	SU Soccer Stadium; Syracuse, NY
August 12*; 7:00 p.m.		Lafayette	W 2–0	–	SU Soccer Stadium; Syracuse, NY
Non-conference regular season
August 19*; 7:00 p.m., ACCNX		Albany	Canceled	–	SU Soccer Stadium; Syracuse, NY
August 22*; Noon, ACCNX		Fairleigh Dickinson	W 2–0	1–0–0	SU Soccer Stadium (303); Syracuse, NY
August 26*; 4:30 p.m., ACCN		Niagara	L 2–4	1–1–0	SU Soccer Stadium (102); Syracuse, NY
August 29*; 1:00 p.m., ACCNX		Eastern Michigan	W 2–1	2–1–0	SU Soccer Stadium (24); Syracuse, NY
September 2*; 7:00 p.m., ACCNX		Binghamton	W 1–0	3–1–0	SU Soccer Stadium (56); Syracuse, NY
September 5*; 2:00 p.m.		at New Hampshire	W 2–0	4–1–0	Wildcat Stadium (252); Durham, NH
September 9*; 7:00 p.m., ACCNX		Cornell	T 0–0	4–1–1	SU Soccer Stadium (45); Syracuse, NY
September 12*; 1:00 p.m.		at Connecticut	L 0–3	4–2–1	Morrone Stadium (963); Storrs, CT
ACC regular season
September 18; 7:00 p.m., ACCNX		at Notre Dame	L 0–4	4–3–1 (0–1–0)	Alumni Stadium (542); Notre Dame, IN
September 23; 6:00 p.m., ACCN		Louisville	L 1–2	4–4–1 (0–2–0)	SU Soccer Stadium (23); Syracuse, NY
September 26; 1:00 p.m., ACCNX		Wake Forest	L 0–2	4–5–1 (0–3–0)	SU Soccer Stadium (34); Syracuse, NY
October 2; 7:00 p.m., ACCNX		at No. 4 Duke	L 0–2	4–6–1 (0–4–0)	Koskinen Stadium (784); Durham, NC
October 7; 7:00 p.m., ACCNX		at No. 1 Florida State	L 0–5	4–7–1 (0–5–0)	Seminole Soccer Complex (1,464); Tallahassee, FL
October 10; Noon, ACCNX		No. 2 Virginia	L 0–5	4–8–1 (0–6–0)	SU Soccer Stadium (78); Syracuse, NY
October 18; Noon, ACCNX		Pittsburgh	L 2–4	4–9–1 (0–7–0)	SU Soccer Stadium (12); Syracuse, NY
October 21; 7:00 p.m., ACCNX		at Clemson	L 0–8	4–10–1 (0–8–0)	Riggs Field (371); Clemson, SC
October 24; 1:00 p.m., ACCNX		at NC State	L 0–3	4–11–1 (0–9–0)	Dail Soccer Field (296); Raleigh, NC
October 28; 7:00 p.m., ACCNX		Virginia Tech	L 1–2	4–12–1 (0–10–0)	SU Soccer Stadium (59); Syracuse, NY
*Non-conference game. ^{#}Rankings from United Soccer Coaches. (#) Tournament seedings in parentheses.

== Rankings ==
Ranking movements Legend: — = Not ranked
	Week																
Poll	Pre	1	2	3	4	5	6	7	8	9	10	11	12	13	14	15	Final
United Soccer	—	—	—	—	—	—	—	—	—	—	—	—	—	Not released			—
TopDrawer Soccer	—	—	—	—	—	—	—	—	—	—	—	—	—	—	—	—	—
