= 2021 Pittsburgh Panthers women's soccer team =

American college soccer season

2021 Pittsburgh Panthers women's soccer
- Conference: Atlantic Coast Conference
- Record: 11–7–0 (4–6–0 ACC)
- Head coach: Randy Waldrum (4th season)
- Assistant coaches: Ben Waldrum (4th season); Dustin Stein (4th season)
- Home stadium: Ambrose Urbanic Field

2021 ACC women's soccer standings
	Conf.						Overall
Team	W		L		T	PCT	W		L		T	PCT
No. 8 Virginia ‍†‍‍^{y}	8	–	0	–	2	.900	18	–	3	–	2	.826
No. 1 Florida State ‍‍‡‍^{y}	7	–	1	–	2	.800	21	–	1	–	3	.900
No. 5 Duke ‍‍‍^{y}	7	–	2	–	1	.750	16	–	4	–	1	.786
No. 16 Notre Dame ‍‍‍^{y}	7	–	3	–	0	.700	14	–	6	–	2	.682
Clemson ‍‍‍^{y}	6	–	3	–	1	.650	12	–	7	–	1	.625
No. 14 North Carolina ‍‍‍^{y}	5	–	2	–	3	.650	12	–	3	–	3	.750
No. 25 Wake Forest ‍‍‍^{y}	6	–	4	–	0	.600	16	–	6	–	0	.727
Virginia Tech ‍‍‍^{y}	5	–	3	–	2	.600	12	–	6	–	2	.650
Pittsburgh ‍‍‍	4	–	6	–	0	.400	11	–	7	–	0	.611
NC State ‍‍‍^{y}	4	–	6	–	0	.400	9	–	9	–	2	.500
Louisville ‍‍‍	3	–	6	–	1	.350	7	–	7	–	2	.500
Boston College ‍‍‍	1	–	9	–	0	.100	7	–	10	–	1	.417
Miami (FL) ‍‍‍	1	–	9	–	0	.100	4	–	12	–	0	.250
Syracuse ‍‍‍	0	–	10	–	0	.000	4	–	12	–	1	.265
† – Conference champion ‡ – 2021 ACC Tournament champion y – Invited to the NCAA Tournament; As of December 7, 2021; Rankings from United Soccer Coaches Poll; Source: The ACC

The 2021 Pittsburgh Panthers women's soccer team represented University of Pittsburgh during the 2021 NCAA Division I women's soccer season. The Panthers were led by head coach Randy Waldrum, in his fourth season. They played home games at Ambrose Urbanic Field. This was the team's 26th season playing organized women's college soccer and their 9th playing in the Atlantic Coast Conference.

The Panthers finished the season 11–7–0 overall, and 4–6–0 in ACC play to finish in ninth place. They did not qualify for the ACC Tournament and were not invited to the NCAA Tournament.

== Previous season ==
Due to the COVID-19 pandemic, the ACC played a reduced schedule in 2020 and the NCAA Tournament was postponed to 2021. The ACC did not play a spring league schedule, but did allow teams to play non-conference games that would count toward their 2020 record in the lead up to the NCAA Tournament.

The Panthers finished the fall season 9–5–0, 3–5–0 in ACC play to finish in tenth place. They did not qualify for the ACC Tournament. The team won both games of their extra spring season. They were not invited to the NCAA Tournament.

== Squad ==
=== Roster ===
As of March 22, 2022

Note: Flags indicate national team as defined under FIFA eligibility rules; some limited exceptions apply. Players may hold more than one non-FIFA nationality.

No.	Pos.	Nation	Player
0	GK	USA	Kathernie Robinson
1	GK	USA	Caitlyn Lazzarini
2	MF	USA	Bri Hilsenteger
3	MF	USA	Mackenzie Edwards
4	MF	USA	Ellie Coffield
5	FW	USA	Sarah Schupansky
6	MF	USA	Landy Mertz
7	MF	CAN	Chantelle Parker
8	FW	CAN	Leah Pais
9	FW	CAN	Amanda West
10	MF	USA	Emily Yaple
11	DF	USA	Hailey Davidson
12	MF	CAN	Anna Bout
13	DF	USA	Eva Frankovic
14	FW	USA	Sarah Sinnott
15	MF	CAN	Chloe Minas
16	MF	USA	Haley Schmidt

No.	Pos.	Nation	Player
17	DF	MEX	Athalie Palomo
18	MF	USA	Elena Hinkson
19	DF	USA	Kate McKay
20	MF	USA	Maddie Keister
21	MF	USA	Celia Lopez
22	MF	USA	Krystyna Rytel
23	FW	USA	Lacey Bernick
25	GK	USA	Madison Vukas
26	MF	USA	Kelly Moss
27	MF	USA	Hannah Knych
28	FW	USA	Mackenzie Evers
29	FW	USA	Emily Harrigan
30	FW	USA	Katelyn Kauffman
31	FW	USA	Sara Darlington
32	DF	USA	Ashton Gordon
33	GK	USA	Gabriella Neibart
35	DF	USA	Ashley Moon

=== Team management ===
Position	Staff
Head coach	Randy Waldrum
Associate Head Coach	Ben Waldrum
Assistant Coach	Dustin Stein

== Schedule ==
Date Time, TV	Rank^{#}	Opponent^{#}	Result	Record	Site (Attendance) City, State
Exhibition
August 10*		at Youngstown State	W 2–0	–	Farmers National Bank Field; Youngstown, OH
August 13*; 5:00 p.m.		at Ohio State	W 2–0	–	Jesse Owens Memorial Stadium; Columbus, OH
Non-conference regular season
August 19*; 4:00 p.m.		vs. Tulsa	W 3–0	1–0–0	Neal Patterson Stadium (200); Stillwater, OK
August 22*; 11:00 a.m.		at No. 16 Oklahoma State	W 3–2 ^{OT}	2–0–0	Neal Patterson Stadium (786); Stillwater, OK
August 26*; 5:00 p.m.		Cleveland State	W 5–0	3–0–0	Ambrose Urbanic Field (637); Pittsburgh, PA
August 29*; 1:00 p.m.		NJIT	W 5–0	4–0–0	Ambrose Urbanic Field (509); Pittsburgh, PA
September 2*; 7:00 p.m.	No. 20	at Saint Joseph's	W 3–0	5–0–0	Sweeney Field (203); Philadelphia, PA
September 5*; 1:00 p.m.	No. 20	No. 6 TCU	L 0–1	5–1–0	Ambrose Urbanic Field (590); Pittsburgh, PA
September 9*; 7:00 p.m.	No. 20	Saint Francis	W 7–0	6–1–0	Ambrose Urbanic Field (480); Pittsburgh, PA
September 12*; 1:00 p.m.	No. 20	Towson	W 2–0	7–1–0	Ambrose Urbanic Field (408); Pittsburgh, PA
ACC Regular season
September 16; 7:00 p.m.	No. 19	at Clemson	L 0–2	7–2–0 (0–1–0)	Riggs Field (329); Clemson, SC
September 23; 8:00 p.m.		at No. 1 Florida State	L 0–5	7–3–0 (0–2–0)	Seminole Soccer Complex (1,767); Tallahassee, FL
September 26; 3:00 p.m.		at Miami (FL)	W 2–0	8–3–0 (1–2–0)	Cobb Stadium (263); Coral Gables, FL
October 2; 7:00 p.m.		No. 19 Virginia Tech	L 1–2	8–4–0 (1–3–0)	Ambrose Urbanic Field (732); Pittsburgh, PA
October 7; 7:00 p.m.		No. 5 North Carolina	L 0–1	8–5–0 (1–4–0)	Ambrose Urbanic Field (1,531); Pittsburgh, PA
October 10; 2:00 p.m.		at No. 4 Duke	L 0–5	8–6–0 (1–5–0)	Koskinen Stadium (555); Durham, NC
October 18; Noon		at Syracuse	W 4–2	9–6–0 (2–5–0)	SU Soccer Stadium (12); Syracuse, NY
October 21; 7:00 p.m.		Boston College	W 3–0	10–6–0 (3–5–0)	Ambrose Urbanic Field (185); Pittsburgh, PA
October 24; 1:00 p.m.		Wake Forest	L 1–2	10–7–0 (3–6–0)	Ambrose Urbanic Field (674); Pittsburgh, PA
October 28; 7:00 p.m.		NC State	W 2–0	11–7–0 (4–6–0)	Ambrose Urbanic Field (314); Pittsburgh, PA
*Non-conference game. ^{#}Rankings from United Soccer Coaches. (#) Tournament seedings in parentheses. All times are in Eastern.

== Rankings ==
Ranking movements Legend: ██ Increase in ranking ██ Decrease in ranking — = Not ranked RV = Received votes
	Week																	
Poll	Pre	1	2	3	4	5	6	7	8	9	10	11	12	13	14	15	16	Final
United Soccer	—	RV	20	20	19	RV	—	—	—	—	—	—	—	Not released				—
TopDrawer Soccer	—	23	21	22	20	—	—	—	—	—	—	—	—	—	—	—	—	—
