= 2021 Notre Dame Fighting Irish women's soccer team =

American college soccer season

2021 Notre Dame Fighting Irish women's soccer

NCAA Tournament, Round of 16
- Conference: Atlantic Coast Conference
- U. Soc. Coaches poll: No. 16
- TopDrawerSoccer.com: No. 15
- Record: 14–6–2 (7–3–0 ACC)
- Head coach: Nate Norman (4rd season)
- Assistant coaches: Dawn Siergiej (19th season); Jason Hamilton (1st season)
- Home stadium: Alumni Stadium

2021 ACC women's soccer standings
	Conf.						Overall
Team	W		L		T	PCT	W		L		T	PCT
No. 8 Virginia ‍†‍‍^{y}	8	–	0	–	2	.900	18	–	3	–	2	.826
No. 1 Florida State ‍‍‡‍^{y}	7	–	1	–	2	.800	21	–	1	–	3	.900
No. 5 Duke ‍‍‍^{y}	7	–	2	–	1	.750	16	–	4	–	1	.786
No. 16 Notre Dame ‍‍‍^{y}	7	–	3	–	0	.700	14	–	6	–	2	.682
Clemson ‍‍‍^{y}	6	–	3	–	1	.650	12	–	7	–	1	.625
No. 14 North Carolina ‍‍‍^{y}	5	–	2	–	3	.650	12	–	3	–	3	.750
No. 25 Wake Forest ‍‍‍^{y}	6	–	4	–	0	.600	16	–	6	–	0	.727
Virginia Tech ‍‍‍^{y}	5	–	3	–	2	.600	12	–	6	–	2	.650
Pittsburgh ‍‍‍	4	–	6	–	0	.400	11	–	7	–	0	.611
NC State ‍‍‍^{y}	4	–	6	–	0	.400	9	–	9	–	2	.500
Louisville ‍‍‍	3	–	6	–	1	.350	7	–	7	–	2	.500
Boston College ‍‍‍	1	–	9	–	0	.100	7	–	10	–	1	.417
Miami (FL) ‍‍‍	1	–	9	–	0	.100	4	–	12	–	0	.250
Syracuse ‍‍‍	0	–	10	–	0	.000	4	–	12	–	1	.265
† – Conference champion ‡ – 2021 ACC Tournament champion y – Invited to the NCAA Tournament; As of December 7, 2021; Rankings from United Soccer Coaches Poll; Source: The ACC

The 2021 Notre Dame Fighting Irish women's soccer team represented the University of Notre Dame during the 2021 NCAA Division I women's soccer season. It was the 34th season of the university fielding a program. The Fighting Irish were led by 4th year head coach Nate Norman and played their games at Alumni Stadium.

The Fighting Irish finished the season 14–6–2, 7–3–0 in ACC play to finish in fourth place. As the fourth seed in the ACC Tournament, they lost to fifth seed Clemson in the First Round. They received an at-large bid to the NCAA Tournament where they defeated SIU Edwardsville in the First Round, and Purdue on penalties in the Second Round, before losing to Arkansas in the Round of 16 to end their season.

== Previous season ==
Due to the COVID-19 pandemic, the ACC played a reduced schedule in 2020 and the NCAA Tournament was postponed to 2021. The ACC did not play a spring league schedule, but did allow teams to play non-conference games that would count toward their 2020 record in the lead up to the NCAA Tournament.

The Fighting Irish finished the fall season 4–5–0, 4–4–0 in ACC play to finish in a tie for sixth place. They were awarded the eighth seed in the ACC Tournament based on tiebreakers. In the tournament they lost to Florida State in the Quarterfinals. They finished the spring season 2–2–0 and were not invited to the NCAA Tournament.

== Squad ==
=== Roster ===
As of March 8, 2022

Note: Flags indicate national team as defined under FIFA eligibility rules; some limited exceptions apply. Players may hold more than one non-FIFA nationality.

No.	Pos.	Nation	Player
0	GK	USA	Mattie Interian
2	MF	USA	Korbin Albert
3	MF	USA	Maddie Mercado
4	MF	ESA	Sammi Fisher
5	FW	USA	Ellie Ospeck
6	MF	USA	Brooke VanDyck
7	FW	JAM	Kiki Van Zanten
9	FW	USA	Olivia Wingate
10	MF	USA	Erin Hohnstein
11	MF	USA	Sophia Fisher
12	MF	USA	Camryn Dyke
13	MF	USA	Nikki Colantuono
14	DF	USA	Aba Dunbar
15	FW	USA	Kati Druzina
16	MF	USA	Brianna Martinez
17	FW	USA	Audrey Weiss

No.	Pos.	Nation	Player
18	FW	ISL	Hulda Ósk Jónsdóttir
19	MF	USA	Eva Gaetino
20	DF	USA	Maddie Mooney
21	FW	USA	Erin Ospeck
22	DF	USA	Katie Coyle
23	MF	USA	Aly Akers
24	FW	USA	Paige Peltier
25	DF	USA	Waniya Hudson
26	DF	USA	Julia Ware
27	DF	USA	Caroline Gray
28	DF	USA	Eva Wirtz
29	MF	USA	Sophia Prudholme
30	MF	USA	Gabrielle Daly
31	GK	USA	Ashley Naylor
32	GK	USA	Mary Votava
33	GK	USA	Kaylin Slattery

== Team management ==
Position	Staff
Head coach	Nate Norman
Assistant Coach	Dawn Siergiej
Assistant Coach	Jason Hamilton
Director of Operations	Brendan Roth

== Schedule ==
Date Time, TV	Rank^{#}	Opponent^{#}	Result	Record	Site City, State
Exhibition
August 10*		Ohio State	W 3–2	–	Alumni Stadium; Notre Dame, IN
August 14*		at Illinois	W 4–0	–	Demirjian Park; Champaign–Urbana, IL
Non-conference regular season
August 19*; 7:00 p.m.		Bowling Green	W 3–1	1–0–0	Alumni Stadium (351); Notre Dame, IN
August 22*; 4:00 p.m.		Indiana	T 0–0 ^{2OT}	1–0–1	Alumni Stadium (825); Notre Dame, IN
August 26*; 8:30 p.m.		at Wisconsin	W 2–1 ^{OT}	2–0–1	McClimon Stadium (313); Madison, WI
August 29*; 1:00 p.m., FloSports		at Marquette	W 1–0	3–0–1	Valley Fields (581); Milwaukee, WI
September 2*; 7:00 p.m., ACCNX		Purdue	W 1–0	4–0–1	Alumni Stadium (435); Notre Dame, IN
September 5*; 1:00 p.m.		at Missouri	L 2–3 ^{OT}	4–1–1	Audrey J. Walton Soccer Stadium (561); Columbia, MO
September 9*; 7:00 p.m.		Detroit	W 8–0	5–1–1	Alumni Stadium (250); Notre Dame, IN
September 12*; 1:00 p.m.		Brown	W 2–1	6–1–1	Alumni Stadium (444); Notre Dame, IN
ACC Regular Season
September 18; 7:00 p.m.		Syracuse	W 4–0	7–1–1 (1–0–0)	Alumni Stadium (542); Notre Dame, IN
September 23; 5:00 p.m.		at Miami (FL)	W 5–0	8–1–1 (2–0–0)	Cobb Stadium (162); Coral Gables, FL
September 26; 1:00 p.m.		Boston College	W 4–1	9–1–1 (3–0–0)	Alumni Stadium (351); Notre Dame, IN
October 1; 7:00 p.m.		at NC State	W 2–1	10–1–1 (4–0–0)	Dail Soccer Field (626); Raleigh, NC
October 7; 7:00 p.m.	No. 24	Louisville	W 3–0	11–1–1 (5–0–0)	Alumni Stadium (289); Notre Dame, IN
October 10; 3:00 p.m., ACCNX	No. 24	Clemson	W 2–1	12–1–1 (6–0–0)	Alumni Stadium (597); Notre Dame, IN
October 17; 1:00 p.m., ACCN	No. 17	at No. 2 Virginia	L 1–2	12–2–1 (6–1–0)	Klöckner Stadium (2,490); Charlottesville, VA
October 21; 7:00 p.m., ACCNX	No. 15	at No. 6 Duke	L 0–1 ^{OT}	12–3–1 (6–2–0)	Koskinen Stadium (704); Durham, NC
October 24; 1:00 p.m., ACCNX	No. 15	at No. 7 North Carolina	L 1–2 ^{2OT}	12–4–1 (6–3–0)	Dorrance Field (2,248); Chapel Hill, NC
October 28; 7:00 p.m.	No. 22	Wake Forest	W 2–1	13–4–1 (7–3–0)	Alumni Stadium (277); Notre Dame, IN
ACC Tournament
October 31; 6:00 p.m., ACCN	(4) No. 22	(5) Clemson; First Round	L 2–3	13–5–1	Alumni Stadium (268); Notre Dame, IN
NCAA Tournament
November 14; 1:00 p.m.	(3)	SIU Edwardsville	W 4–0	14–5–1	Alumni Stadium (204); Notre Dame, IN
November 19; 5:30 p.m.	(3)	vs. No. 24 Purdue	T 1–1 (4–3 PKs) ^{2OT}	14–5–2	Razorback Field (1,505); Fayetteville, AR
November 21; 5:30 p.m.	(3)	(2) No. 7 Arkansas	L 2–3	14–6–2	Razorback Field (1,579); Fayetteville, AR
*Non-conference game. ^{#}Rankings from United Soccer Coaches. (#) Tournament seedings in parentheses. All times are in Eastern.

== Rankings ==
Ranking movements Legend: ██ Increase in ranking ██ Decrease in ranking RV = Received votes
	Week																	
Poll	Pre	1	2	3	4	5	6	7	8	9	10	11	12	13	14	15	16	Final
United Soccer			RV	RV	RV	RV	RV	24	17	15	22	RV	RV	Not released				16
TopDrawer Soccer						24	22	20	15	13	14	17	25	23	20	22	22	15

== 2022 NWSL Draft ==
Player	Team	Round	Pick #	Position
Sammi Fisher	Chicago Red Stars	2	19	MF
