= 2021 North Carolina Tar Heels women's soccer team =

American college soccer season

2021 North Carolina Tar Heels women's soccer

NCAA Tournament, First Round
- Conference: Atlantic Coast Conference
- U. Soc. Coaches poll: No. 14
- TopDrawerSoccer.com: No. 17
- Record: 12–3–3 (5–2–3 ACC)
- Head coach: Anson Dorrance (45th season)
- Assistant coaches: Chris Ducar (26th season); Damon Nahas (6th season); Heather O'Reilly (3rd season)
- Home stadium: Dorrance Field

2021 ACC women's soccer standings
	Conf.						Overall
Team	W		L		T	PCT	W		L		T	PCT
No. 8 Virginia ‍†‍‍^{y}	8	–	0	–	2	.900	18	–	3	–	2	.826
No. 1 Florida State ‍‍‡‍^{y}	7	–	1	–	2	.800	21	–	1	–	3	.900
No. 5 Duke ‍‍‍^{y}	7	–	2	–	1	.750	16	–	4	–	1	.786
No. 16 Notre Dame ‍‍‍^{y}	7	–	3	–	0	.700	14	–	6	–	2	.682
Clemson ‍‍‍^{y}	6	–	3	–	1	.650	12	–	7	–	1	.625
No. 14 North Carolina ‍‍‍^{y}	5	–	2	–	3	.650	12	–	3	–	3	.750
No. 25 Wake Forest ‍‍‍^{y}	6	–	4	–	0	.600	16	–	6	–	0	.727
Virginia Tech ‍‍‍^{y}	5	–	3	–	2	.600	12	–	6	–	2	.650
Pittsburgh ‍‍‍	4	–	6	–	0	.400	11	–	7	–	0	.611
NC State ‍‍‍^{y}	4	–	6	–	0	.400	9	–	9	–	2	.500
Louisville ‍‍‍	3	–	6	–	1	.350	7	–	7	–	2	.500
Boston College ‍‍‍	1	–	9	–	0	.100	7	–	10	–	1	.417
Miami (FL) ‍‍‍	1	–	9	–	0	.100	4	–	12	–	0	.250
Syracuse ‍‍‍	0	–	10	–	0	.000	4	–	12	–	1	.265
† – Conference champion ‡ – 2021 ACC Tournament champion y – Invited to the NCAA Tournament; As of December 7, 2021; Rankings from United Soccer Coaches Poll; Source: The ACC

The 2021 North Carolina Tar Heels women's soccer team represented the University of North Carolina at Chapel Hill during the 2021 NCAA Division I women's soccer season. It was the 45th season of the university fielding a program. The Tar Heels were led by 45th year head coach Anson Dorrance and played their home games at Dorrance Field in Chapel Hill, North Carolina.

They finished the season 12–3–3, 5–2–3 in ACC play to finish in a tie for sixth place. Only six teams qualified for the ACC Tournament and the Tar Heels lost the tiebreaker to Wake Forest and did not qualify for the tournament. This was the first time in program history that North Carolina missed out on the ACC Tournament. They received an at-large bid to the 2021 NCAA Division I Women's Soccer Tournament where they lost to South Carolina in the First Round. Their First Round exit was the earliest exit of any NCAA Tournament they had participated in.

== Previous season ==
Due to the COVID-19 pandemic, the ACC played a reduced schedule in 2020 and the NCAA Tournament was postponed to 2021. The ACC did not play a spring league schedule, but did allow teams to play non-conference games that would count toward their 2020 record in the lead up to the NCAA Tournament.

The Tar Heels finished the fall season 11–1–0, 8–0–0 in ACC play to finish in first place. As the second seed in the ACC Tournament, they defeated Virginia Tech, and Virginia, before losing to Florida State in the final. The Tar Heels finished the spring season 4–0 and received an at-large bid to the NCAA Tournament. As the second seed in the tournament, they defeated Denver in the Second Round, Washington in the Third Round, and Texas A&M in the Quarterfinals before losing to Santa Clara in the Semifinals to end their season.

== Squad ==
=== Roster ===
As of September 8, 2021

Note: Flags indicate national team as defined under FIFA eligibility rules; some limited exceptions apply. Players may hold more than one non-FIFA nationality.

No.	Pos.	Nation	Player
0	GK	USA	Claudia Dickey
1	FW	USA	Sam Meza
2	DF	USA	Abby Allen
3	MF	ENG	Ruby Grant
4	DF	USA	Paige Tolentino
5	MF	USA	Mary Elliot McCabe
6	MF	USA	Emerson Elgin
7	DF	USA	Julia Dorsey
8	FW	USA	Emily Moxley
9	MF	USA	Rachel Dorwart
10	MF	USA	Rachel Jones
11	MF	USA	Lauren Wrigley
13	FW	USA	Isabel Cox
14	MF	USA	Kai Hayes
15	FW	USA	Avery Patterson
16	FW	USA	Aleigh Gambone
17	GK	USA	Marz Josephson
18	MF	USA	Bella Sember
19	MF	USA	Emily Colton

No.	Pos.	Nation	Player
20	MF	USA	Libby Moore
21	FW	USA	Ally Sentnor
22	DF	USA	Tori Hansen
23	MF	USA	Madi Pry
24	FW	USA	Talia DellaPeruta
25	DF	USA	Maycee Bell
26	FW	USA	Hallie Klanke
27	MF	USA	Makenna Dominguez
28	MF	USA	Maggie Pierce
29	MF	USA	Meilin Gregg
31	MF	FIN	Annika Huhta
32	GK	USA	Emmie Allen
33	MF	USA	Riley Quinlan
35	FW	IRL	Emily Murphy
39	FW	USA	Asha Means
71	FW	USA	Mollie Baker
82	MF	USA	Carly Wetzel
98	FW	USA	Anna Priborkina

=== Team management ===
Position	Staff
Athletic Director	Bubba Cunningham
Head coach	Anson Dorrance
Associate head coach	Damon Nahas
Assistant Coach	Chris Ducar
Assistant Coach	Heather O'Reilly
Director of Operations	Tom Sander

== Schedule ==
Date Time, TV	Rank^{#}	Opponent^{#}	Result	Record	Site (Attendance) City, State
Exhibition
August 9; 5:00 p.m.	No. 3	UNCW	W 3–1	–	Dorrance Field (812); Chapel Hill, NC
August 12; 7:00 p.m.	No. 3	at High Point	W 6–1	–	Bryan Park; Browns Summit, NC
Non-conference Regular season
August 19; 7:00 p.m., ACCNX	No. 3	No. 19 Washington	W 4–1	1–0–0	Dorrance Field (2,186); Chapel Hill, NC
August 22; 1:00 p.m., ACCN	No. 3	No. 13 Arkansas	W 1–0	2–0–0	Dorrance Field (1,532); Chapel Hill, NC
August 26; 9:00 p.m., BTN	No. 2	at Illinois	W 5–1	3–0–0	Demirjian Park (833); Urbana-Champaign, IL
August 29; 1:30 p.m., BTN	No. 2	at Ohio State	W 2–0	4–0–0	Jesse Owens Memorial Stadium (1,320); Columbus, OH
September 2; 7:00 p.m., ACCNX	No. 2	Northwestern	W 2–0	5–0–0	Dorrance Field (1,734); Chapel Hill, NC
September 5; 1:00 p.m., ACCNX	No. 2	No. 10 Stanford	W 2–1 ^{OT}	6–0–0	Dorrance Field (2,756); Chapel Hill, NC
September 9; 7:00 p.m., SECN+	No. 2	at Florida	W 7–1	7–0–0	James G. Pressly Stadium (493); Gainesville, FL
September 12; 1:00 p.m., ESPN+	No. 2	at No. 17 UCF	Canceled due to weather		UCF Soccer and Track Stadium; Orlando, FL
ACC Regular Season
September 17; 7:00 p.m., ACCNX	No. 2	No. 4 Duke; Rivalry	L 0–1	7–1–0 (0–1–0)	Dorrance Field (5,301); Chapel Hill, NC
September 23; 7:00 p.m., ACCNX	No. 4	Virginia Tech	T 2–2 ^{2OT}	7–1–1 (0–1–1)	Dorrance Field (2,157); Chapel Hill, NC
September 26; 1:00 p.m., ACCNX	No. 4	No. 22 Clemson	W 3–0	8–1–1 (1–1–1)	Dorrance Field (1,885); Chapel Hill, NC
October 3; 1:00 p.m., ACCN	No. 5	No. 2 Virginia	T 0–0 ^{2OT}	8–1–2 (1–1–2)	Dorrance Field (2,222); Chapel Hill, NC
October 7; 7:00 p.m., ACCNX	No. 5	at Pittsburgh	W 1–0	9–1–2 (2–1–2)	Ambrose Urbanic Field (1,531); Pittsburgh, PA
October 10; 1:00 p.m., ACCN	No. 5	at Boston College	W 2–1 ^{OT}	10–1–2 (3–1–2)	Newton Campus Soccer Field (853); Chestnut Hill, MA
October 16; 7:00 p.m., ACCNX	No. 3	at NC State; Rivalry	L 0–1	10–2–2 (3–2–2)	Dail Soccer Field (1,234); Raleigh, NC
October 21; 8:00 p.m., ACCN	No. 7	No. 1 Florida State	T 2–2 ^{2OT}	10–2–3 (3–2–3)	Dorrance Field (1,447); Chapel Hill, NC
October 24; 1:00 p.m., ACCNX	No. 7	No. 15 Notre Dame	W 1–2 ^{2OT}	11–2–3 (4–2–3)	Dorrance Field (2,248); Chapel Hill, NC
October 28; 7:00 p.m., ACCNX	No. 7	at Miami (FL)	W 4–0	12–2–3 (5–2–3)	Cobb Stadium (706); Coral Gables, FL
NCAA Tournament
November 13; 2:00 p.m., ACCNX	(2) No. 10	South Carolina; First Round	L 0–1	12–3–3	Dorrance Field (2,390); Chapel Hill, NC
*Non-conference game. ^{#}Rankings from United Soccer Coaches. (#) Tournament seedings in parentheses. All times are in Eastern.

== Awards and honors ==
Recipient	Award	Date	Ref.
Maycee Bell	Preseason All-ACC Team	August 12	
Rachel Jones	Preseason All-ACC Team	August 12	
Claudia Dickey	Preseason Hermann Trophy Watchlist	August 19	
Rachel Jones	Preseason Hermann Trophy Watchlist	August 19	
Claudia Dickey	ACC Defensive Player of the Week	August 31	
Avery Patterson	ACC Co-defensive Player of the Week	October 5	
Maycee Bell	All-ACC First Team	November 4	
Sam Meza	All-ACC Second Team	November 4	
Claudia Dickey	All-ACC Third Team	November 4	
Emily Colton	ACC All-Freshman Team	November 4	
Emily Murphy	ACC All-Freshman Team	November 4	

== Rankings ==
Ranking movements Legend: ██ Increase in ranking ██ Decrease in ranking ( ) = First-place votes
	Week																
Poll	Pre	1	2	3	4	5	6	7	8	9	10	11	12	13	14	15	Final
United Soccer	3 (3)	2 (4)	2 (1)	2 (2)	2 (1)	4	5	5	3	7	7	7	10	Not released			14
TopDrawer Soccer	4	4	3	3	2	4	4	4	3	6	5	4	4	14	16	16	17

== 2022 NWSL Draft ==
Player	Team	Round	Pick #	Position
Claudia Dickey	OL Reign	2	20	GK
