= 2021 Virginia Tech Hokies women's soccer team =

American college soccer season

2021 Virginia Tech Hokies women's soccer

NCAA Tournament, Second Round
- Conference: Atlantic Coast Conference
- U. Soc. Coaches poll: No. RV
- Record: 12–6–2 (5–3–2 ACC)
- Head coach: Charles Adair (11th season)
- Assistant coaches: Drew Kopp (10th season); Matt Gwilliam (7th season)
- Home stadium: Thompson Field

2021 ACC women's soccer standings
	Conf.						Overall
Team	W		L		T	PCT	W		L		T	PCT
No. 8 Virginia ‍†‍‍^{y}	8	–	0	–	2	.900	18	–	3	–	2	.826
No. 1 Florida State ‍‍‡‍^{y}	7	–	1	–	2	.800	21	–	1	–	3	.900
No. 5 Duke ‍‍‍^{y}	7	–	2	–	1	.750	16	–	4	–	1	.786
No. 16 Notre Dame ‍‍‍^{y}	7	–	3	–	0	.700	14	–	6	–	2	.682
Clemson ‍‍‍^{y}	6	–	3	–	1	.650	12	–	7	–	1	.625
No. 14 North Carolina ‍‍‍^{y}	5	–	2	–	3	.650	12	–	3	–	3	.750
No. 25 Wake Forest ‍‍‍^{y}	6	–	4	–	0	.600	16	–	6	–	0	.727
Virginia Tech ‍‍‍^{y}	5	–	3	–	2	.600	12	–	6	–	2	.650
Pittsburgh ‍‍‍	4	–	6	–	0	.400	11	–	7	–	0	.611
NC State ‍‍‍^{y}	4	–	6	–	0	.400	9	–	9	–	2	.500
Louisville ‍‍‍	3	–	6	–	1	.350	7	–	7	–	2	.500
Boston College ‍‍‍	1	–	9	–	0	.100	7	–	10	–	1	.417
Miami (FL) ‍‍‍	1	–	9	–	0	.100	4	–	12	–	0	.250
Syracuse ‍‍‍	0	–	10	–	0	.000	4	–	12	–	1	.265
† – Conference champion ‡ – 2021 ACC Tournament champion y – Invited to the NCAA Tournament; As of December 7, 2021; Rankings from United Soccer Coaches Poll; Source: The ACC

The 2021 Virginia Tech Hokies women's soccer team represented Virginia Tech during the 2021 NCAA Division I women's soccer season. It was the 29th season of the university fielding a program and 18th competing in the Atlantic Coast Conference. The Hokies were led by 11th year head coach Charles Adair and played their home games at Thompson Field.

The Hokies finished the season 12–6–2, 5–3–2 in ACC play to finish in eight place. They did not qualify for the ACC Tournament as only six teams were invited. They received an automatic bid to the NCAA Tournament where they defeated Ohio State in the first round before losing to Arkansas in the second round to end their season.

== Previous season ==
Due to the COVID-19 pandemic, the ACC played a reduced schedule in 2020 and the NCAA Tournament was postponed to 2021. The ACC did not play a spring league schedule, but did allow teams to play non-conference games that would count toward their 2020 record in the lead up to the NCAA Tournament.

The Hokies finished the fall season 5–8–0, 4–4–0 in ACC play to finish in a tie for sixth place. They were awarded the seventh seed in the ACC Tournament based on tiebreakers. In the tournament they lost to North Carolina in the quarterfinals. They finished the spring season 3–1–0 and were not invited to the NCAA Tournament.

== Squad ==
=== Roster ===
As of January 12, 2022

Note: Flags indicate national team as defined under FIFA eligibility rules; some limited exceptions apply. Players may hold more than one non-FIFA nationality.

No.	Pos.	Nation	Player
00	GK	USA	Lauren Hargrove
0	GK	USA	Dare Burnett
1	GK	USA	Alia Skinner
2	MF	USA	Riley McCarthy
3	FW	USA	Kendal Feighan
4	MF	USA	Emily Gray
5	DF	FIN	Aino Vuorinen
6	MF	USA	Makenzie Graham
7	MF	USA	Avery Tharrington
8	FW	USA	Ayden Yates
9	FW	USA	Emma Steigerwald
10	FW	UKR	Nicole Kozlova
11	MF	USA	Gabby Johnson
12	FW	USA	Tori Powell
13	FW	USA	Karlie Johnson
14	DF	USA	Allie Lewis

No.	Pos.	Nation	Player
15	FW	USA	Sophie Maltese
16	MF	USA	Erin Carleton
18	MF	USA	Lauren Gogal
19	MF	USA	Holly Webber
20	DF	USA	Victoria Haugen
21	DF	USA	Averi Visage
22	FW	USA	Taylor Bryan
23	FW	USA	Kate Bonshak
24	FW	USA	Emmalee McCarter
25	FW	USA	Calista Heister
26	MF	USA	Emma Pelkowski
27	DF	USA	Ava Veith
28	DF	USA	Victoria Moser
30	GK	USA	S.A. Phillips
32	FW	USA	Allie George

== Team management ==
Position	Staff
Head coach	Charles Adair
Associate head coach	Drew Kopp
Assistant Coach	Matt Gwilliam

== Schedule ==
Date Time, TV	Rank^{#}	Opponent^{#}	Result	Record	Site (Attendance) City, State
Exhibition
August 8*; 11:00 a.m.		Loyola (MD)	W 2–0	–	Thompson Field; Blacksburg, VA
August 12*; 5:40 p.m.		Richmond	W 2–0	–	Thompson Field; Blacksburg, VA
Non-conference regular season
August 19*; 7:00 p.m., ACCNX		Liberty	W 3–0	1–0–0	Thompson Field (505); Blacksburg, VA
August 22*; 4:00 p.m., ACCNX		Williams & Mary	W 1–0	2–0–0	Thompson Field (1,228); Blacksburg, VA
August 26*; 7:00 p.m., ACCNX		Elon	W 7–1	3–0–0	Thompson Field (663); Blacksburg, VA
August 29*; 1:00 p.m., ESPN+		at Cincinnati	L 1–2	3–1–0	Gettler Stadium (523); Cincinnati, OH
September 2*; 5:00 p.m.		at James Madison; Marriott Invitational	W 3–2	4–1–0	Sentara Park (303); Harrisonburg, VA
September 5*; 11:00 a.m.		vs. No. 9 Santa Clara; Marriott Invitational	L 0–2	4–2–0	Sentara Park (119); Harrisonburg, VA
September 9*; 5:00 p.m., ACCNX		Villanova	W 5–1	5–2–0	Thompson Field (332); Blacksburg, VA
September 12*; 5:00 p.m., SECN		at No. 12 South Carolina	W 1–0	6–2–0	Stone Stadium (1,415); Columbia, SC
ACC Regular Season
September 18; 7:00 p.m., ACCNX		NC State	W 1–0	7–2–0 (1–0–0)	Thompson Field (1,364); Blacksburg, VA
September 23; 7:00 p.m., ACCNX		at No. 4 North Carolina	T 2–2 ^{2OT}	7–2–1 (1–0–1)	Dorrance Field (2,157); Chapel Hill, NC
September 26; 5:00 p.m., ACCN		No. 2 Duke	T 1–1 ^{2OT}	7–2–2 (1–0–2)	Thompson Field (923); Blacksburg, VA
October 2; 7:00 p.m., ACCNX	No. 19	at Pittsburgh	W 2–1	8–2–2 (2–0–2)	Ambrose Urbanic Field (732); Pittsburgh, PA
October 7; 8:00 p.m., ACCN	No. 17	at Clemson	L 0–1	8–3–2 (2–1–2)	Riggs Field (152); Clemson, SC
October 10; 5:00 p.m., ACCN	No. 17	at Wake Forest	L 3–4	8–4–2 (2–2–2)	Spry Stadium (601); Winston-Salem, NC
October 15; 5:00 p.m., ACCRSN		No. 1 Florida State	L 0–2	8–5–2 (2–3–2)	Thompson Field (1,072); Blacksburg, VA
October 21; 7:00 p.m., ACCNX		Miami (FL)	W 5–0	9–5–2 (3–3–2)	Thompson Field (520); Blacksburg, VA
October 24; Noon, RSN		Boston College	W 1–0	10–5–2 (4–3–2)	Thompson Field (619); Blacksburg, VA
October 28; 7:00 p.m., ACCNX		at Syracuse	W 2–1	11–5–2 (5–3–2)	SU Soccer Stadium (59); Syracuse, NY
NCAA tournament
November 12*; 6:00 p.m., ACCNX		Ohio State; First Round	W 3–1	12–5–2	Thompson Field (797); Blacksburg, VA
November 19*; 7:30 p.m., SECN+		at (2) No. 7 Arkansas; Second Round	L 0–3	12–6–2	Razorback Field (1,505); Fayetteville, AR
*Non-conference game. ^{#}Rankings from United Soccer Coaches. (#) Tournament seedings in parentheses. All times are in Eastern.

== Rankings ==
Ranking movements Legend: ██ Increase in ranking ██ Decrease in ranking — = Not ranked RV = Received votes
	Week																	
Poll	Pre	1	2	3	4	5	6	7	8	9	10	11	12	13	14	15	16	Final
United Soccer	—	RV	—	—	RV	RV	19	17	RV	RV	RV	RV	RV	Not released				RV
TopDrawer Soccer	—	—	—	—	—	—	—	—	25	—	—	—	—	—	—	—	—	—

== 2022 NWSL Draft ==
Player	Team	Round	Pick #	Position
Emily Gray	North Carolina Courage	1	3	MF
