= 2021 Louisville Cardinals women's soccer team =

2021 Louisville Cardinals women's soccer
- Conference: Atlantic Coast Conference
- Record: 7–7–2 (3–6–1 ACC)
- Head coach: Karen Ferguson-Dayes (22nd season)
- Assistant coaches: Hunter Norton (6th season); Nick Stirrett (1st season)
- Home stadium: Lynn Stadium

2021 ACC women's soccer standings
	Conf.						Overall
Team	W		L		T	PCT	W		L		T	PCT
No. 8 Virginia ‍†‍‍^{y}	8	–	0	–	2	.900	18	–	3	–	2	.826
No. 1 Florida State ‍‍‡‍^{y}	7	–	1	–	2	.800	21	–	1	–	3	.900
No. 5 Duke ‍‍‍^{y}	7	–	2	–	1	.750	16	–	4	–	1	.786
No. 16 Notre Dame ‍‍‍^{y}	7	–	3	–	0	.700	14	–	6	–	2	.682
Clemson ‍‍‍^{y}	6	–	3	–	1	.650	12	–	7	–	1	.625
No. 14 North Carolina ‍‍‍^{y}	5	–	2	–	3	.650	12	–	3	–	3	.750
No. 25 Wake Forest ‍‍‍^{y}	6	–	4	–	0	.600	16	–	6	–	0	.727
Virginia Tech ‍‍‍^{y}	5	–	3	–	2	.600	12	–	6	–	2	.650
Pittsburgh ‍‍‍	4	–	6	–	0	.400	11	–	7	–	0	.611
NC State ‍‍‍^{y}	4	–	6	–	0	.400	9	–	9	–	2	.500
Louisville ‍‍‍	3	–	6	–	1	.350	7	–	7	–	2	.500
Boston College ‍‍‍	1	–	9	–	0	.100	7	–	10	–	1	.417
Miami (FL) ‍‍‍	1	–	9	–	0	.100	4	–	12	–	0	.250
Syracuse ‍‍‍	0	–	10	–	0	.000	4	–	12	–	1	.265
† – Conference champion ‡ – 2021 ACC Tournament champion y – Invited to the NCAA Tournament; As of December 7, 2021; Rankings from United Soccer Coaches Poll; Source: The ACC

The 2021 Louisville Cardinals women's soccer team represented University of Louisville during the 2021 NCAA Division I women's soccer season. The Cardinals were led by head coach Karen Ferguson-Dayes, in her twenty-second season. They played home games at Lynn Stadium. This was the team's 37th season playing organized women's college soccer and their 8th playing in the Atlantic Coast Conference.

The Cardinals finished the season 7–7–2 overall and 3–6–1 in ACC play to finish in eleventh place. The team did not qualify for the ACC Tournament and were not invited to the NCAA Tournament.

== Previous season ==
Due to the COVID-19 pandemic, the ACC played a reduced schedule in 2020 and the NCAA Tournament was postponed to 2021. The ACC did not play a spring league schedule, but did allow teams to play non-conference games that would count toward their 2020 record in the lead up to the NCAA Tournament.

The Cardinals finished the fall season 4–5–0, 4–4–0 in ACC play to finish in a tie for sixth place. They were awarded the sixth seed in the ACC Tournament based on tiebreakers. In the tournament they lost to Virginia in the Quarterfinals. The Cardinals finished the spring season 1–2–0 and were not invited to the NCAA Tournament.

== Squad ==
=== Roster ===
As of January 6, 2022

Note: Flags indicate national team as defined under FIFA eligibility rules; some limited exceptions apply. Players may hold more than one non-FIFA nationality.

No.	Pos.	Nation	Player
1	GK	USA	Gabby Kouzelos
2	MF	USA	Sarah Hernandez
4	FW	USA	Emma Hiscock
5	FW	USA	Ravin Alexander
6	MF	USA	Riley Mullady
7	MF	USA	Abigail Baldridge
8	DF	USA	Caitlin Elam
9	DF	USA	Lilly Yordy
10	MF	USA	Nina Nicosia
11	MF	USA	Taylor Kerwin
12	FW	USA	Corinne Dente
14	MF	USA	Mikayla Hampton
15	MF	USA	Hayley Howard

No.	Pos.	Nation	Player
16	FW	USA	Julia Simon
17	MF	USA	Kiana Klein
18	DF	ENG	Anouk Denton
19	MF	USA	Maisie Whitsett
20	FW	USA	Savina Zamborini
21	DF	USA	Sophia Zinn
23	MF	USA	Morgan Bentley
24	MF	USA	Delaney Snyder
26	MF	USA	Cassie Amshoff
28	MF	USA	Brooke Dardano
29	MF	USA	Ava Nielson
30	GK	USA	Olivia Pratapas

=== Team management ===
Position	Staff
Karen Ferguson-Dayes	Head coach
Nick Stirrett	Assistant Coach
Hunter Norton	Assistant Coach
Declan Doherty	Performance Analyst
Jing Hughley	Director of Operations

== Schedule ==
Date Time, TV	Rank^{#}	Opponent^{#}	Result	Record	Site (Attendance) City, State
Exhibition
August 14*; 7:30 p.m.		Ball State	W 2–0	–	Lynn Stadium; Louisville, KY
Non-conference regular season
August 19*; 7:30 p.m., ACCNX		Western Michigan	W 6–2	1–0–0	Lynn Stadium (503); Louisville, KY
August 27*; 7:30 p.m., ACCNX		James Madison	W 4–3	2–0–0	Lynn Stadium (357); Louisville, KY
August 29*; 7:30 p.m., ACCNX		Northern Kentucky	W 3–0	3–0–0	Lynn Stadium (536); Louisville, KY
September 2*; 8:00 p.m., ESPN+		at Saint Louis	W 1–0	4–0–0	Hermann Stadium (1,552); St. Louis, MO
September 5*; 7:30 p.m., ACCNX		Western Kentucky	L 0–1	4–1–0	Lynn Stadium (623); Louisville, KY
September 10*; 5:00 p.m., ACCNX		No. 16 Michigan	T 1–1 ^{2OT}	4–1–1	Lynn Stadium (600); Louisville, KY
ACC Regular Season
September 17; 7:00 p.m., ACCNX		at Miami (FL)	W 3–2 ^{2OT}	5–1–1 (1–0–0)	Cobb Stadium (154); Coral Gables, FL
September 23; 6:00 p.m., ACCN		at Syracuse	W 2–1	6–1–1 (2–0–0)	SU Soccer Stadium (23); Syracuse, NY
September 26; 1:00 p.m., ACCNX		No. 1 Florida State	L 0–3	6–2–1 (2–1–0)	Lynn Stadium (376); Louisville, KY
October 2; 7:00 p.m., ACCNX		Wake Forest	W 2–1 ^{OT}	7–2–1 (3–1–0)	Lynn Stadium (397); Louisville, KY
October 7; 8:00 p.m., ACCRSN		at No. 24 Notre Dame	L 0–3	7–3–1 (3–2–0)	Alumni Stadium (289); Notre Dame, IN
October 10; 1:00 p.m., ACCNX		NC State	L 1–2	7–4–1 (3–3–0)	Lynn Stadium (483); Louisville, KY
October 15; 4:00 p.m., ACCNX		Boston College	L 1–2	7–5–1 (3–4–0)	Lynn Stadium (385); Louisville, KY
October 21; 7:00 p.m., ACCNX		at No. 2 Virginia	L 1–4	7–6–1 (3–5–0)	Klöckner Stadium (1,564); Charlottesville, VA
October 24; 1:00 p.m., ACCNX		at Clemson	T 1–1 ^{2OT}	7–6–2 (3–5–1)	Riggs Field (284); Clemson, SC
October 28; 5:00 p.m., ACCN		No. 2 Duke	L 0–1	7–7–2 (3–6–1)	Lynn Stadium (304); Louisville, KY
*Non-conference game. ^{#}Rankings from United Soccer Coaches. (#) Tournament seedings in parentheses.

== Rankings ==
Ranking movements Legend: — = Not ranked
	Week																	
Poll	Pre	1	2	3	4	5	6	7	8	9	10	11	12	13	14	15	16	Final
United Soccer	—	—	—	—	—	—	—	—	—	—	—	—	—	Not released				—
TopDrawer Soccer	—	—	—	—	—	—	—	—	—	—	—	—	—	—	—	—	—	—
