= 2021 Boston College Eagles women's soccer team =

American college soccer season

2021 Boston College Eagles women's soccer
- Conference: Atlantic Coast Conference
- Record: 7–10–1 (1–9–0 ACC)
- Head coach: Jason Lowe (3rd season)
- Assistant coaches: Taylor Schram (1st season); Jami Kranich (3rd season)
- Home stadium: Newton Campus Soccer Field

2021 ACC women's soccer standings
	Conf.						Overall
Team	W		L		T	PCT	W		L		T	PCT
No. 8 Virginia ‍†‍‍^{y}	8	–	0	–	2	.900	18	–	3	–	2	.826
No. 1 Florida State ‍‍‡‍^{y}	7	–	1	–	2	.800	21	–	1	–	3	.900
No. 5 Duke ‍‍‍^{y}	7	–	2	–	1	.750	16	–	4	–	1	.786
No. 16 Notre Dame ‍‍‍^{y}	7	–	3	–	0	.700	14	–	6	–	2	.682
Clemson ‍‍‍^{y}	6	–	3	–	1	.650	12	–	7	–	1	.625
No. 14 North Carolina ‍‍‍^{y}	5	–	2	–	3	.650	12	–	3	–	3	.750
No. 25 Wake Forest ‍‍‍^{y}	6	–	4	–	0	.600	16	–	6	–	0	.727
Virginia Tech ‍‍‍^{y}	5	–	3	–	2	.600	12	–	6	–	2	.650
Pittsburgh ‍‍‍	4	–	6	–	0	.400	11	–	7	–	0	.611
NC State ‍‍‍^{y}	4	–	6	–	0	.400	9	–	9	–	2	.500
Louisville ‍‍‍	3	–	6	–	1	.350	7	–	7	–	2	.500
Boston College ‍‍‍	1	–	9	–	0	.100	7	–	10	–	1	.417
Miami (FL) ‍‍‍	1	–	9	–	0	.100	4	–	12	–	0	.250
Syracuse ‍‍‍	0	–	10	–	0	.000	4	–	12	–	1	.265
† – Conference champion ‡ – 2021 ACC Tournament champion y – Invited to the NCAA Tournament; As of December 7, 2021; Rankings from United Soccer Coaches Poll; Source: The ACC

The 2021 Boston College Eagles women's soccer team represented Boston College during the 2021 NCAA Division I women's soccer season. The Eagles were led by head coach Jason Lowe, in his third season. They played home games at Newton Campus Soccer Field. This was the team's 41st season playing organized women's college soccer, and their 17th playing in the Atlantic Coast Conference.

The Eagles finished 7–10–1 overall and 1–9–0 in ACC play to finish in a tie for twelfth place. They did not qualify for the ACC Tournament and were not invited to the NCAA Tournament.

== Previous season ==
Due to the COVID-19 pandemic, the ACC played a reduced schedule in 2020 and the NCAA Tournament was postponed to 2021. The ACC did not play a spring league schedule, but did allow teams to play non-conference games that would count toward their 2020 record in the lead up to the NCAA Tournament.

The Eagles finished the fall season 1–7–0, 1–7–0 in ACC play to finish in a tie for eleventh place. They did not qualify for the ACC Tournament. They finished the spring season 2–3–1 and were not invited to the NCAA Tournament.

== Squad ==
=== Roster ===
As of December 14, 2021

Note: Flags indicate national team as defined under FIFA eligibility rules; some limited exceptions apply. Players may hold more than one non-FIFA nationality.

No.	Pos.	Nation	Player
0	GK	USA	Mackenzie Egan
1	GK	GER	Wiebke Willebrandt
2	GK	USA	Eva Nahas
3	DF	USA	Haley Thomas
4	FW	USA	Jenna Bike
5	MF	USA	Sonia Walk
6	DF	IRL	Éabha O'Mahony
7	FW	USA	Zoie Allen
8	MF	USA	Laura Gouvin
9	MF	USA	Sam Smith
10	FW	USA	Emily Knous
11	DF	USA	Becca McCourt
12	MF	USA	Megan Crevoiserat
13	FW	ISL	Linda Boama

No.	Pos.	Nation	Player
14	DF	USA	Taliyah Walker
15	MF	USA	Samantha Agresti
16	DF	USA	Kate Goggins
17	FW	USA	Abby McNamara
18	MF	USA	Rebecca Groseibl
19	DF	USA	Emma Goggins
20	MF	USA	Alison Heckman
21	FW	USA	Andi Barth
22	FW	USA	Ella Richards
23	DF	USA	Michela Agresti
24	DF	USA	Mia Karras
27	DF	USA	Sydney Moore
28	DF	USA	Sarai Costello
32	MF	USA	Jessica Carlton

=== Team management ===
Position	Staff
Head coach	Jason Lowe
Associate head coach	Taylor Schram
Assistant coach	Jami Kranich
Volunteer Assistant Coach	Michael Galvin

== Schedule ==
Date Time, TV	Rank^{#}	Opponent^{#}	Result	Record	Site (Attendance) City, State
Exhibition
August 7; 4:00 p.m.		at Army	W 1–0	-	James Clinton Field; West Point, NY
August 12; 3:00 p.m.		Colgate	W 1–0	-	Newton Campus Soccer Field; Chestnut Hill, MA
Non-conference regular season
August 19; 1:00 p.m.		at Iona	W 5–0	1–0–0	Mazzella Field (142); New Rochelle, NY
August 23; 1:00 p.m.		UMass	W 3–1	2–0–0	Newton Campus Soccer Field (100); Chestnut Hill, MA
August 26; 7:00 p.m., ACCNX		Boston University	W 3–1	3–0–0	Newton Campus Soccer Field (150); Chestnut Hill, MA
August 29; 1:00 p.m., ACCNX		UConn	W 4–1	4–0–0	Newton Campus Soccer Field (226); Chestnut Hill, MA
September 2; 7:00 p.m., SECN+		at No. 12 South Carolina	L 0–1	4–1–0	Stone Stadium (1,512); Columbia, SC
September 5 Noon		at Kennesaw State	W 4–0	5–1–0	Fifth Third Bank Stadium (172); Kennesaw, GA
September 9; 7:00 p.m., NESN		at Harvard	T 3–3 ^{2OT}	5–1–1	Jordan Field (113); Boston, MA
September 12; 1:00 p.m., ACCNX		Holy Cross	W 5–3	6–1–1	Newton Campus Soccer Field (213); Chestnut Hill, MA
ACC regular season
September 18; 6:00 p.m., ACCNX		at No. 1 Florida State	L 1–4	6–2–1 (0–1–0)	Seminole Soccer Complex (1,387); Tallahassee, FL
September 23; 7:00 p.m., ACCNX		Wake Forest	L 0–1	6–3–1 (0–2–0)	Newton Campus Soccer Field (103); Chestnut Hill, MA
September 26; 1:00 p.m., ACCNX		at Notre Dame	L 1–4	6–4–1 (0–3–0)	Alumni Stadium (351); Notre Dame, IN
October 2; 7:00 p.m., ACCNX		Miami (FL)	L 0–1	6–5–1 (0–4–0)	Newton Campus Soccer Field (529); Chestnut Hill, MA
October 7; 7:00 p.m., ACCNX		No. 2 Virginia	L 0–3	6–6–1 (0–5–0)	Newton Campus Soccer Field (304); Chestnut Hill, MA
October 10; 7:00 p.m., ACCN		No. 5 North Carolina	L 1–2 ^{OT}	6–7–1 (0–6–0)	Newton Campus Soccer Field (853); Chestnut Hill, MA
October 15; 4:00 p.m., ACCNX		at Louisville	W 2–1	7–7–1 (1–6–0)	Lynn Stadium (385); Louisville, KY
October 21; 7:00 p.m., ACCN		at Pittsburgh	L 0–3	7–8–1 (1–7–0)	Ambrose Urbanic Field (185); Pittsburgh, PA
October 24; Noon, ACCRSN		at Virginia Tech	L 0–1	7–9–1 (1–8–0)	Thompson Field (619); Blacksburg, VA
October 28; 5:00 p.m., ACCNX		Clemson	L 1–4	7–10–1 (1–9–0)	Newton Campus Soccer Field (230); Chestnut Hill, MA
*Non-conference game. ^{#}Rankings from United Soccer Coaches. (#) Tournament seedings in parentheses. All times are in Eastern.

== Awards and honors ==
Recipient	Award	Date	Ref.
Linda Boama	ACC Defensive Player of the Week	August 31	

== Rankings ==
Ranking movements Legend: — = Not ranked RV = Received votes
	Week																
Poll	Pre	1	2	3	4	5	6	7	8	9	10	11	12	13	14	15	Final
United Soccer			RV											Not released			—
TopDrawer Soccer																	
