= 2021 Virginia Cavaliers women's soccer team =

American Women's Soccer Team

2021 Virginia Cavaliers women's soccer

ACC Regular Season Champions

NCAA Tournament, Round of 16
- Conference: Atlantic Coast Conference
- U. Soc. Coaches poll: No. 8
- TopDrawerSoccer.com: No. 9
- Record: 18–3–2 (8–0–2 ACC)
- Head coach: Steve Swanson (22nd season)
- Assistant coaches: Ron Raab (16th season); Jaime Frias (3rd season)
- Home stadium: Klöckner Stadium

2021 ACC women's soccer standings
	Conf.						Overall
Team	W		L		T	PCT	W		L		T	PCT
No. 8 Virginia ‍†‍‍^{y}	8	–	0	–	2	.900	18	–	3	–	2	.826
No. 1 Florida State ‍‍‡‍^{y}	7	–	1	–	2	.800	21	–	1	–	3	.900
No. 5 Duke ‍‍‍^{y}	7	–	2	–	1	.750	16	–	4	–	1	.786
No. 16 Notre Dame ‍‍‍^{y}	7	–	3	–	0	.700	14	–	6	–	2	.682
Clemson ‍‍‍^{y}	6	–	3	–	1	.650	12	–	7	–	1	.625
No. 14 North Carolina ‍‍‍^{y}	5	–	2	–	3	.650	12	–	3	–	3	.750
No. 25 Wake Forest ‍‍‍^{y}	6	–	4	–	0	.600	16	–	6	–	0	.727
Virginia Tech ‍‍‍^{y}	5	–	3	–	2	.600	12	–	6	–	2	.650
Pittsburgh ‍‍‍	4	–	6	–	0	.400	11	–	7	–	0	.611
NC State ‍‍‍^{y}	4	–	6	–	0	.400	9	–	9	–	2	.500
Louisville ‍‍‍	3	–	6	–	1	.350	7	–	7	–	2	.500
Boston College ‍‍‍	1	–	9	–	0	.100	7	–	10	–	1	.417
Miami (FL) ‍‍‍	1	–	9	–	0	.100	4	–	12	–	0	.250
Syracuse ‍‍‍	0	–	10	–	0	.000	4	–	12	–	1	.265
† – Conference champion ‡ – 2021 ACC Tournament champion y – Invited to the NCAA Tournament; As of December 7, 2021; Rankings from United Soccer Coaches Poll; Source: The ACC

The 2021 Virginia Cavaliers women's soccer team represented the University of Virginia during the 2021 NCAA Division I women's soccer season. The Cavaliers were led by head coach Steve Swanson, in his twenty second season. They played home games at Klöckner Stadium. This was the team's 36th season playing organized women's college soccer and their 34th playing in the Atlantic Coast Conference.

The Cavaliers finished the season 18–3–2 and 8–0–2 in ACC play to finish as regular season champions. As the top seed in the ACC Tournament they received a bye into the Semifinals. They defeated Clemson before losing to Florida State in the Final. They received an at-large bid to the NCAA Tournament and were one of the four number one seeds. They defeated High Point in the First Round and Milwaukee in the Second Round before losing to BYU in the Sweet 16 to end their season.

== Previous season ==
Due to the COVID-19 pandemic, the ACC played a reduced schedule in 2020 and the NCAA Tournament was postponed to 2021.

The Cavaliers finished the fall season 8–3–1, 5–2–1 in ACC play to finish in third place. In the ACC Tournament they defeated Louisville in the Quarterfinals before losing to North Carolina in the Semifinals. The Cavaliers finished the spring season 2–1–1 and received an at-large bid to the NCAA Tournament. As an unseeded team, the Cavaliers defeated SIU Edwardsville in the First Round, BYU in the Second Round, Rice in the Third Round, and TCU in the Quarterfinals before losing to Florida State on penalties in the Semifinals.

== Squad ==
=== Roster ===
As of September 9, 2021

Note: Flags indicate national team as defined under FIFA eligibility rules; some limited exceptions apply. Players may hold more than one non-FIFA nationality.

No.	Pos.	Nation	Player
0	GK	USA	Laurel Ivory
1	GK	USA	Michaela Moran
2	MF	USA	Sydney Zandi
3	MF	USA	Alexis Theoret
4	FW	USA	Cam Lexow
5	DF	USA	Lizzy Sieracki
6	FW	USA	Jansen Eichenlaub
7	FW	USA	Alexa Spaanstra
8	DF	USA	Sarah Clark
9	FW	MEX	Diana Ordóñez
10	MF	USA	Taryn Torres
11	MF	USA	Lacey McCormack
12	DF	HAI	Claire Constant
13	FW	USA	Rebecca Jarrett
14	MF	USA	Emma Dawson
15	FW	USA	Brianna Jablonowski
16	DF	USA	Kiki Maki

No.	Pos.	Nation	Player
17	FW/MF	USA	Haley Hopkins
18	FW/MF	USA	Sarah Brunner
19	MF	USA	Madeline Simpson
20	DF	USA	Talia Staude
21	MF	USA	Lauren Hinton
22	MF	USA	Lia Godfrey
23	DF	USA	Laney Rouse
24	DF	USA	Kira Maguire
25	DF	USA	Samar Guidry
26	MF	USA	Laughlin Ryan
27	MF	USA	Maggie Fralin
28	MF	USA	Peyton Goldthwaite
29	GK	USA	Cayla White
30	FW	USA	Degen Miller
31	MF	USA	Charlotte McClure
32	GK	USA	Camryn Miller
33	GK	USA	Ally Reynolds

=== Team management ===
Position	Staff
Athletic Director	Carla Williams
Head coach	Steve Swanson
Associate head coach	Ron Raab
Assistant coach	Jamie Frias
Volunteer Assistant Coach	Jake Davis
Director of operations	Eilidh Thomson

== Schedule ==
Date Time, TV	Rank^{#}	Opponent^{#}	Result	Record	Site (Attendance) City, State
Exhibition
August 11*; 3:00 p.m.	No. 4	at Central Michigan	W 3–0	–	Central Michigan Soccer/Lacrosse Complex; Maple City, MI
August 14*; Noon	No. 4	at Michigan	W 1–0	–	U-M Soccer Stadium; Ann Arbor, MI
Non-conference Regular season
August 19*; 7:00 p.m., ACCNX	No. 4	Richmond	W 8–0	1–0–0	Klöckner Stadium (1,162); Charlottesville, VA
August 22*; 2:00 p.m., ESPN+	No. 4	at No. 12 West Virginia	W 1–0	2–0–0	Dick Dlesk Soccer Stadium (1,433); Morgantown, WV
August 26*; 7:00 p.m., ESPN+	No. 3	at George Mason	W 2–0	3–0–0	George Mason Stadium (1,325); Fairfax, VA
August 29*; 2:00 p.m., ACCNX	No. 3	George Washington	W 6–1	4–0–0	Klöckner Stadium (1,267); Charlottesville, VA
September 2*; 8:00 p.m.	No. 3	vs. No. 9 Santa Clara	W 1–0	5–0–0	Sentara Park (116); Harrisonburg, VA
September 3*; 3:00 p.m., FloSports	No. 3	at James Madison	W 2–0	6–0–0	Sentara Park (548); Harrisonburg, VA
September 9*; 8:00 p.m., ACCN	No. 3	No. 14 Penn State	L 2–4	6–1–0	Klöckner Stadium (1,559); Charlottesville, VA
September 12*; Noon, ACCNX	No. 3	Oklahoma	W 2–1	7–1–0	Klöckner Stadium (1,052); Charlottesville, VA
ACC Regular Season
September 15; 5:00 p.m., ACCNX	No. 7	at Wake Forest	W 1–0	8–1–0 (1–0–0)	Spry Stadium (1,487); Winston-Salem, NC
September 23; 7:00 p.m., ACCNX	No. 7	No. 2 Duke	W 1–0	9–1–0 (2–0–0)	Klöckner Stadium (1,911); Charlottesville, VA
September 26; 1:00 p.m., ACCNX	No. 7	at NC State	W 2–1	10–1–0 (3–0–0)	Dail Soccer Field (264); Raleigh, NC
October 3; 1:00 p.m., ACCN	No. 2	at No. 5 North Carolina	T 0–0 ^{2OT}	10–1–1 (3–0–1)	Dorrance Field (2,222); Chapel Hill, NC
October 7; 7:00 p.m., ACCNX	No. 2	at Boston College	W 3–0	11–1–1 (4–0–1)	Newton Campus Soccer Field (304); Chestnut Hill, MA
October 10; Noon, ACCNX	No. 2	at Syracuse	W 5–0	12–1–1 (5–0–1)	SU Soccer Stadium (78); Syracuse, NY
October 17; 1:00 p.m., ACCN	No. 2	No. 17 Notre Dame	W 2–1	13–1–1 (6–0–1)	Klöckner Stadium (2,490); Charlottesville, VA
October 21; 7:00 p.m., ACCNX	No. 2	Louisville	W 4–1	14–1–1 (7–0–1)	Klöckner Stadium (1,564); Charlottesville, VA
October 24; 3:00 p.m., ACCRSN	No. 2	Miami (FL)	W 6–1	15–1–1 (8–0–1)	Klöckner Stadium (2,396); Charlottesville, VA
October 28; 7:00 p.m., ACCN	No. 1	at No. 3 Florida State	T 1–1 ^{2OT}	15–1–2 (8–0–2)	Seminole Soccer Complex (2,388); Tallahassee, FL
ACC Tournament
November 5; 5:30 p.m., ACCN	(1) No. 1	vs. (5) No. 24 Clemson; Semifinals	W 1–0	16–1–2	WakeMed Soccer Park (2,687); Cary, NC
November 7; 1:00 p.m., ESPNU	(1) No. 1	vs. (2) No. 2 Florida State; Finals	L 0–1	16–2–2	WakeMed Soccer Park (1,250); Cary, NC
NCAA Tournament
November 12; 6:00 p.m., ACCNX	(1) No. 2	High Point; First Round	W 6–0	17–2–2	Klöckner Stadium (1,201); Charlottesville, VA
November 18; 7:00 p.m., ACCNX	(1) No. 2	Milwaukee; Second Round	W 2–0	18–2–2	Klöckner Stadium (1,445); Charlottesville, VA
November 20; 7:00 p.m., ACCNX	(1) No. 2	(4) No. 13 BYU; Round of 16	L 0–1	18–3–2	Klöckner Stadium (0); Charlottesville, VA
*Non-conference game. ^{#}Rankings from United Soccer Coaches. (#) Tournament seedings in parentheses. All times are in Eastern.

== Awards and honors ==
Recipient	Award	Date	Ref.
Lia Godfrey	Preseason All-ACC Team	August 12	
Alexa Spaanstra	Preseason All-ACC Team	August 12	
Lia Godfrey	Preseason Hermann Trophy Watchlist	August 19	
Haley Hopkins	Preseason Hermann Trophy Watchlist	August 19	
Alexa Spaanstra	Preseason Hermann Trophy Watchlist	August 19	
Claire Constant	ACC Defensive Player of the Week	September 7	
Diana Ordóñez	ACC Co-offensive Player of the Week	September 28	
Alexa Spaanstra	ACC Co-offensive Player of the Week	October 19	
Diana Ordoñez	ACC Co-offensive Player of the Week	October 26	
Steve Swanson	ACC Coach of the Year	November 4	
Diana Ordoñez	ACC Offensive Player of the Year	November 4	
Lia Godfrey	All-ACC First Team	November 4	
Diana Ordoñez	All-ACC First Team	November 4	
Samar Guidry	All-ACC Second Team	November 4	
Laurel Ivory	All-ACC Second Team	November 4	
Alexa Spaanstra	All-ACC Second Team	November 4	
Haley Hopkins	All-ACC Third Team	November 4	
Taryn Torres	All-ACC Third Team	November 4	
Haley Hopkins	ACC All-Tournament Team	November 7	
Diana Ordoñez	ACC All-Tournament Team	November 7	
Alexa Spaanstra	ACC All-Tournament Team	November 7	
Talia Staude	ACC All-Tournament Team	November 7	

== Rankings ==
Ranking movements Legend: ██ Increase in ranking ██ Decrease in ranking ( ) = First-place votes
	Week																
Poll	Pre	1	2	3	4	5	6	7	8	9	10	11	12	13	14	15	Final
United Soccer	4 (1)	3 (1)	3	3 (1)	7	7	2 (1)	2 (1)	2 (1)	2 (2)	1 (26)	1 (28)	2 (3)	Not released			8
TopDrawer Soccer	3	3	2	2	7	5	2	2	2	2	1	1	3	2	9	9	9

== 2022 NWSL draft ==
Player	Team	Round	Pick #	Position
Diana Ordóñez	North Carolina Courage	1	6	FW
