= 2021 NC State Wolfpack women's soccer team =

American college soccer season

2021 NC State Wolfpack women's soccer

NCAA Tournament, Second Round
- Conference: Atlantic Coast Conference
- Record: 9–9–2 (4–6–0 ACC)
- Head coach: Tim Santoro (10th season)
- Assistant coaches: Glen Tourville (5th season); Steve McKenna (5th season)
- Home stadium: Dail Soccer Field

2021 ACC women's soccer standings
	Conf.						Overall
Team	W		L		T	PCT	W		L		T	PCT
No. 8 Virginia ‍†‍‍^{y}	8	–	0	–	2	.900	18	–	3	–	2	.826
No. 1 Florida State ‍‍‡‍^{y}	7	–	1	–	2	.800	21	–	1	–	3	.900
No. 5 Duke ‍‍‍^{y}	7	–	2	–	1	.750	16	–	4	–	1	.786
No. 16 Notre Dame ‍‍‍^{y}	7	–	3	–	0	.700	14	–	6	–	2	.682
Clemson ‍‍‍^{y}	6	–	3	–	1	.650	12	–	7	–	1	.625
No. 14 North Carolina ‍‍‍^{y}	5	–	2	–	3	.650	12	–	3	–	3	.750
No. 25 Wake Forest ‍‍‍^{y}	6	–	4	–	0	.600	16	–	6	–	0	.727
Virginia Tech ‍‍‍^{y}	5	–	3	–	2	.600	12	–	6	–	2	.650
Pittsburgh ‍‍‍	4	–	6	–	0	.400	11	–	7	–	0	.611
NC State ‍‍‍^{y}	4	–	6	–	0	.400	9	–	9	–	2	.500
Louisville ‍‍‍	3	–	6	–	1	.350	7	–	7	–	2	.500
Boston College ‍‍‍	1	–	9	–	0	.100	7	–	10	–	1	.417
Miami (FL) ‍‍‍	1	–	9	–	0	.100	4	–	12	–	0	.250
Syracuse ‍‍‍	0	–	10	–	0	.000	4	–	12	–	1	.265
† – Conference champion ‡ – 2021 ACC Tournament champion y – Invited to the NCAA Tournament; As of December 7, 2021; Rankings from United Soccer Coaches Poll; Source: The ACC

The 2021 NC State Wolfpack women's soccer team represented NC State University during the 2021 NCAA Division I women's soccer season. The Wolfpack were led by head coach Tim Santoro, in his tenth season. They played home games at Dail Soccer Field. This was the team's 38th season playing organized women's college soccer and their 35th playing in the Atlantic Coast Conference.

The Wolfpack finished the season 9–9–2 overall and 4–6–0 in ACC play to finish in a tie for ninth place. They did not qualify for the ACC Tournament. They received an at-large bid to the NCAA Tournament. As an unseeded team in the Florida State Bracket they defeated South Florida in the First Round before losing to fourth seed Pepperdine in the Second Round to end their season.

== Previous season ==
Due to the COVID-19 pandemic, the ACC played a reduced schedule in 2020 and the NCAA Tournament was postponed to 2021. The ACC did not play a spring league schedule, but did allow teams to play non-conference games that would count toward their 2020 record in the lead up to the NCAA Tournament.

The Wolfpack did not play in the fall season. However, they did resume play for the spring non-conference season.

The Wolfpack finished the spring season 5–3–1 and did not receive an at-large invitation to the NCAA Tournament. Their non-invitation broke a four-year streak of being invited to the tournament.

== Squad ==
=== Roster ===
As of January 10, 2022

Note: Flags indicate national team as defined under FIFA eligibility rules; some limited exceptions apply. Players may hold more than one non-FIFA nationality.

No.	Pos.	Nation	Player
0	GK	USA	Eden Millan
1	GK	USA	Grace Spriggs
2	DF	GER	Nina Zimmer
3	DF	USA	Briana Weber
4	FW	USA	Leyah Hall-Robinson
5	DF	USA	Jenna Butler
6	DF	GER	Lulu Guttenberger
7	MF	JPN	Emika Kawagishi
8	FW	USA	Denae Antoine
9	MF	CZE	Toni Starova
10	MF	GER	Annika Wohner
11	DF	USA	Fernanda Soto
12	MF	USA	Jaiden Thomas
13	DF	USA	Margot Ridgeway

No.	Pos.	Nation	Player
14	FW	USA	Mia Vaughan
15	FW	USA	Jameese Joseph
17	FW	USA	Brianna Holt
18	DF	USA	Madison Reid
19	GK	ESP	María Echezarreta
20	DF	USA	Mia Thillet
21	MF	USA	Michaela Virgin
22	MF	USA	Sandra Geiselhart
23	DF	USA	Cara Elmendorf
24	MF	USA	Samantha Castro
25	MF	USA	Sarah Arnold
26	GK	USA	Nadia Stupec
28	DF	USA	Kayla Siddiqi

=== Team management ===
Position	Staff
Athletic Director	Boo Corrigan
Head coach	Tim Santoro
Associate head coach	Glen Tourville
Assistant coach	Steve McKenna
Director of operations	Kim Kern

== Schedule ==
Date Time, TV	Rank^{#}	Opponent^{#}	Result	Record	Site (Attendance) City, State
Exhibition
August 7*; 7:00 p.m.		Coastal Carolina	W 3–1	–	Dail Soccer Field; Raleigh, NC
August 12*; 2:00 p.m.		vs. No. 12 West Virginia	T 1–1	–	Thompson Field; Blacksburg, VA
Non-conference regular season
August 19*; 4:00 p.m., FloSports		at No. 9 Georgetown	T 2–2 ^{2OT}	0–0–1	Shaw Field (27); Washington, D.C.
August 22*; 6:00 p.m., C-USA TV		at Old Dominion	W 2–1	1–0–1	Old Dominion Soccer Complex (180); Norfolk, VA
August 26*; 7:00 p.m., ESPN+		at Campbell	T 1–1 ^{2OT}	1–0–2	Eakes Athletics Complex (369); Buies Creek, NC
August 29*; 1:00 p.m., ACCN		No. 10 South Carolina	L 1–2	1–1–2	Dail Soccer Field (651); Raleigh, NC
September 2*; 7:00 p.m., ESPN+		at UNC Greensboro	W 3–0	2–1–2	UNCG Soccer Stadium (993); Greensboro, NC
September 5*; 7:00 p.m., ACCNX		Elon	W 1–0	3–1–2	Dail Soccer Field (572); Raleigh, NC
September 9*; 4:30 p.m., ACCNX		vs. Oklahoma	W 5–0	4–1–2	Klöckner Stadium (612); Charlottesville, VA
September 12*; 3:00 p.m., ACCNX		vs. No. 11 Penn State	L 0–1	4–2–2	Klöckner Stadium (53); Charlottesville, VA
ACC regular season
September 18; 7:00 p.m., ACCNX		at Virginia Tech	L 0–1	4–3–2 (0–1–0)	Thompson Field (1,364); Blacksburg, VA
September 23; 7:00 p.m., ACCNX		No. 16 Clemson	L 1–2	4–4–2 (0–2–0)	Dail Soccer Field (647); Raleigh, NC
September 26; 1:00 p.m., ACCNX		No. 5 Virginia	L 1–2	4–5–2 (0–3–0)	Dail Soccer Field (264); Raleigh, NC
October 1; 7:00 p.m., ACCNX		No. 20 Notre Dame	L 1–2	4–6–2 (0–4–0)	Dail Soccer Field (626); Raleigh, NC
October 7; 6:00 p.m., ACCN		at No. 4 Duke	W 2–1 ^{OT}	5–6–2 (1–4–0)	Koskinen Stadium (626); Durham, NC
October 10; 1:00 p.m., ACCNX		at Louisville	W 2–1	6–6–2 (2–4–0)	Lynn Stadium (483); Louisville, KY
October 16; 7:00 p.m., ACCNX		No. 3 North Carolina; Rivalry	W 1–0	7–6–2 (3–4–0)	Dail Soccer Field (1,234); Raleigh, NC
October 21; 7:00 p.m., ACCNX		at Wake Forest	L 0–1	7–7–2 (3–5–0)	Spry Stadium (722); Winston-Salem, NC
October 24; 7:00 p.m., ACCNX		Syracuse	W 3–0	8–7–2 (4–5–0)	Dail Soccer Field (296); Raleigh, NC
October 28; 7:00 p.m., ACCNX		at Pittsburgh	L 0–2	8–8–2 (4–6–0)	Ambrose Urbanic Field (314); Pittsburgh, PA
NCAA tournament
November 14; 1:00 p.m., ESPN+		No. 22 South Florida; First Round	W 2–0	9–8–2	Corbett Stadium (797); Tampa, FL
November 19; 2:00 p.m., ACCNX		(4) No. 7 Pepperdine; Second Round	L 0–3	9–9–2	Seminole Soccer Complex (258); Tallahassee, FL
*Non-conference game. ^{#}Rankings from United Soccer Coaches. (#) Tournament seedings in parentheses. All times are in Eastern.

== Rankings ==
Ranking movements Legend: ██ Increase in ranking ██ Decrease in ranking — = Not ranked RV = Received votes
	Week																	
Poll	Pre	1	2	3	4	5	6	7	8	9	10	11	12	13	14	15	16	Final
United Soccer	—	—	—	—	—	—	—	—	—	RV	—	—	—	Not released				—
TopDrawer Soccer	—	—	—	—	—	—	—	—	—	—	—	—	—	—	—	—	—	—
