= Maria Alagoa =

Portuguese footballer (born 2003)

Personal information
- Full name: Maria Miguel Pereira Alagoa
- Date of birth: 21 April 2003 (age 23)
- Height: 5 ft 5 in (1.65 m)
- Position: Midfielder

Team information
- Current team: Braga
- Number: 8

College career
| Years | Team | Apps | (Gls) |
| 2021–2023 | Florida State Seminoles | 57 | (8) |
| 2024 | USC Trojans | 23 | (6) |

Senior career*
| Years | Team | Apps | (Gls) |
| 2018–2021 | Lusitano Vildemoinhos | 39 | (35) |
| 2025– | Braga | 8 | (0) |

International career^{‡}
| 2019–2020 | Portugal U-17 | 8 | (1) |
| 2022 | Portugal U-19 | 5 | (2) |
| 2023–2025 | Portugal U-23 | 8 | (2) |
| 2024– | Portugal | 2 | (0) |
- * Club domestic league appearances and goals as of October 15, 2025 ‡ National team caps and goals as of April 3, 2025

Maria Miguel Pereira Alagoa (born 21 April 2003) is a Portuguese professional footballer who plays as a midfielder for Campeonato Nacional Feminino club Braga. She played college soccer for the Florida State Seminoles and the USC Trojans, winning two NCAA championships with the Seminoles.

== Early life ==
Alagoa grew up in Viseu, the daughter of Isabel Rodrigues and Fernando Alagoa. She began playing football with local club Dínamo Clube Estação. After one season each with Os Repesenses and Viseu 2001, she moved to Lusitano Vildemoinhos, where she played three seasons.

== College career ==
Alagoa played three seasons for the Florida State Seminoles, scoring 8 goals in 57 games primarily as a substitute. She was named to the ACC all-freshman team in 2021 after scoring 5 goals on the season, including the extra time golden goal against Wake Forest in the ACC tournament semifinals. She made four appearances during the NCAA tournament as the Seminoles won their third national title. After three seasons, two NCAA championships, and three ACC tournament titles, she transferred to the USC Trojans for her senior season in 2024. She started all 23 games and scored 6 goals, earning second-team All-Big Ten honors. She helped the Trojans to the Big Ten regular-season title and the NCAA tournament quarterfinals.

== Club career ==
After college, in July 2025, Alagoa signed a two-year contract with Campeonato Nacional Feminino club Braga.

== International career ==
Alagoa was an alternate for Portugal at the 2023 FIFA Women's World Cup.

== Honors and awards ==
Florida State Seminoles

- NCAA Division I women's soccer tournament: 2021, 2023
- ACC women's soccer tournament: 2021, 2022, 2023

USC Trojans

- Big Ten Conference: 2024

Individual

- Second-team All-Big Ten: 2024
- ACC tournament all-tournament team: 2021
- ACC all-freshman team: 2021
