= Jenna Menta =

American soccer player (born 1999)

Personal information
- Full name: Jenna Renée Menta
- Date of birth: July 1, 1999 (age 27)
- Place of birth: Somers, New York, U.S.
- Height: 5 ft 7 in (1.70 m)
- Position: Forward

Team information
- Current team: Fortuna Hjørring
- Number: 26

College career
Years	Team	Apps	(Gls)
2017–2021	Georgetown Hoyas	76	(11)
2021	Wake Forest Demon Deacons	22	(6)

Senior career*
Years	Team	Apps	(Gls)
2022–2023	Fiorentina	2	(0)
2023	Fortuna Hjørring	4	(0)
- * Club domestic league appearances and goals as of February 2, 2026

Jenna Renée Menta (born July 1, 1999) is an American professional soccer player who played as a forward for Danish Women's League club Fortuna Hjørring.
