= 2021 NCAA Division I women's soccer season =

American college soccer season

- Preseason No. 1: Florida State
- Top goalscorer: Nicole Douglas – Arizona State

Statistics

Tournament
- Duration: November 12 – December 5, 2021
- Most conference bids: ACC – 9 bids

College Cup
- Date: December 6, 2021
- Site: Stevens Stadium; San Jose, California
- Champions: Florida State
- Runners-up: BYU

Seasons
- ← 2020 2022 →

The 2021 NCAA Division I women's soccer season was the 40th season of NCAA championship women's college soccer.

== Preseason ==
=== Coaching changes ===
Program	Outgoing coach	Manner of departure	Date of vacancy	Incoming coach	Date of appointment	References
Arizona	Tony Amato	Accepted head coach position at Florida	May 24, 2021	Becca Moros	June 16, 2021	
Canisius	Todd Clark	Resigned	April 2020	Ryan Lewis	April 30, 2021	
Colorado State	Bill Hempen	Fired	May 6, 2021	Keeley Hagen	June 1, 2021	
DePaul	Erin Chastain	Accepted head coach position at Minnesota	June 11, 2021	Michelle O'Brien	June 28, 2021	
Eastern Washington	Chad Bodnar	Contract not renewed	May 10, 2021	Missy Strasburg	June 23, 2021	
Florida	Becky Burleigh	Retired	March 12, 2021	Tony Amato	May 24, 2021	
George Mason	Todd Bramble	Accepted position as Deputy AD	June 8, 2021	Manya Puppione	July 14, 2021	
Houston Baptist	Misty Jones	Resigned	March 2021	Chris Dodd	May 24, 2021	
Michigan State	Tom Saxton	Retired	April 15, 2021	Jeff Hosler	June 14, 2021	
Minnesota	Stefanie Golan	Accepted head coach position at Missouri	May 20, 2021	Erin Chastain	June 11, 2021	
Missouri	Bryan Blitz	Retired	April 18, 2021	Stefanie Golan	May 20, 2021	
Nicholls	Alexsis Cable	Accepted assistant coach position at North Texas	—	Robert Podeyn	June 28, 2021	
Northwestern State	Jess Jobe	Accepted head coach position at Dallas Baptist	May 24, 2021	Stuart Gore	June 18, 2021	
Oregon State	Matt Kagan	Resigned	May 26, 2021	Lauren Sinacoloa	July 2, 2021	
Troy	Ged O'Connor	Accepted head coach position at Saint Leo	July 2021	Nicole Waters (Interim)	July 26, 2021	
Tulsa	Kyle Cussen	Resigned	June 18, 2021	Jim Rhein (interim)	June 18, 2021	
UIC	Dustin Downey (Interim)	Appointed full-time head coach	April 29, 2021	David Nikolic	April 29, 2021	
Utah	Rich Manning	Accepted assistant coach position at Northwestern	April 22, 2021	Hideki Nakada	May 27, 2021	
Utah State	Heather Cairns	Resigned	April 16, 2021	Manny Martins	May 24, 2021	
Wright State	Pat Ferguson	Resigned	—	Travis Sobers	August 4, 2021	
Wyoming	Pete Cuadrado	Accepted head coach position at Tarleton	May 21, 2021	Colleen Boyd	June 21, 2021	

=== New programs ===
- On November 27, 2017, it was announced that, in 2020, the Tritons of the University of California, San Diego, located in the San Diego, California district of La Jolla, would begin the transition from Division II to Division I as a member of the Big West Conference. UC San Diego and the Big West canceled fall sports in 2020 and they did not play a make-up season in the spring of 2021. Therefore, the fall of 2021 was the first season for the Tritons in Division I women's soccer.
- On July 15, 2020, after months of consideration, the NCAA granted the highly unusual request of the University of St. Thomas to move directly from Division III to Division I. The school had already accepted an invitation to join the Summit League, and the Tommies entered Division I and Summit League competition in 2021.

=== Conference realignment ===
School	Previous Conference	New Conference
Abilene Christian	Southland Conference	Western Athletic Conference (WAC)
Central Arkansas	Southland Conference	ASUN Conference
Eastern Kentucky	Ohio Valley Conference (OVC)	ASUN Conference
Howard	Southwestern Athletic Conference (SWAC)	Northeast Conference
Jacksonville State	Ohio Valley Conference (OVC)	ASUN Conference
Lamar	Southland Conference	Western Athletic Conference (WAC)
St. Thomas	Minnesota Intercollegiate Athletic Conference (Division III)	Summit League
Sam Houston	Southland Conference	Western Athletic Conference (WAC)
Stephen F. Austin	Southland Conference	Western Athletic Conference (WAC)
UC San Diego	California Collegiate Athletic Association (Division II)	Big West Conference

In addition to these schools moving divisions, the ASUN Conference and the Western Athletic Conference divided into divisional play for the first time.

== Season outlook ==
=== Preseason polls ===
United Soccer Coaches
Rank	Team
1	Florida State (11)
2	Santa Clara (18)
3	North Carolina (3)
4	Virginia (1)
5	UCLA
6	Duke
7	Clemson
8	TCU
9	Texas A&M
10	Penn State
11	Georgetown
12	West Virginia
13	Arkansas
14	USC
15	BYU
16	Oklahoma State
17	South Carolina
18	Vanderbilt
19	Washington
20	South Florida
21	Saint Louis
22	Rice
23	Ole Miss
24	Stanford
25	Rutgers

Top Drawer Soccer
Rank	Team
1	Santa Clara
2	Florida State
3	Virginia
4	North Carolina
5	UCLA
6	USC
7	Duke
8	Clemson
9	Georgetown
10	Arkansas
11	TCU
12	BYU
13	Texas A&M
14	West Virginia
15	South Carolina
16	Saint Louis
17	Oklahoma State
18	Washington
19	South Florida
20	Penn State
21	Vanderbilt
22	Rice
23	Hofstra
24	Rutgers
25	Brown

== Regular season ==
=== Major upsets ===
In this list, a "major upset" is defined as a game won by a team ranked 10 or more spots lower or an unranked team that defeats a team ranked No. 15 or higher.

All rankings are from the United Soccer Coaches Poll.

Date	Winner	Score	Loser
August 19	Pepperdine	2–0	No. 14 USC
August 21	Auburn	2–1	No. 15 BYU
August 26	Long Beach State	2–1	No. 8 Pepperdine
August 26	LSU	2–1	No. 15 South Florida
August 28	No. 21 Texas A&M	3–1	No. 9 Clemson
August 30	Arkansas	2–0	No. 14 BYU
September 2	Georgia	3–1	No. 15 Clemson
September 5	No. 18 UCF	2–1	No. 7 Penn State
September 9	Princeton	4–3	No. 9 Rutgers
September 9	No. 14 Penn State	4–2	No. 3 Virginia
September 9	Clemson	2–1	No. 12 South Carolina
September 12	No. 24 Georgetown	1–0	No. 9 Rutgers
September 12	Drake	2–0	No. 15 Memphis
September 16	Houston	1–0	No. 14 UCF
September 17	Arkansas	3–1	No. 13 Tennessee
September 23	Northwestern	2–1	No. 12 Penn State
September 23	Ole Miss	2–0	No. 5 LSU
September 26	Baylor	2–1	No. 8 TCU
September 26	Georgia	2–1 (OT)	No. 5 LSU
September 26	Ohio State	2–0	No. 12 Penn State
September 30	Oregon State	2–1	No. 7 Stanford
October 1	No. 25 South Carolina	3–2	No. 13 Auburn
October 7	Houston	1–0	No. 15 SMU
October 7	NC State	2–1 (2OT)	No. 4 Duke
October 10	Kansas	2–1 (2OT)	No. 9 West Virginia
October 14	Northeastern	1–0	No. 12 Hofstra
October 16	NC State	1–0	No. 3 North Carolina
October 17	South Florida	1–0 (OT)	No. 14 Memphis
October 20	Santa Clara	4–0	No. 3 Pepperdine
October 21	Missouri	2–1	No. 13 Ole Miss
October 21	Vanderbilt	2–1	No. 10 Tennessee
October 28	LSU	4–2	No. 4 Arkansas
October 28	Memphis	5–0	No. 14 SMU
October 30	No. 25 Santa Clara	1–0	No. 11 BYU
October 31	Wake Forest	2–1	No. 2 Duke
November 4	St. John's	1–0	No. 11 Xavier
November 12	UC Irvine	1–0	No. 3 UCLA
November 13	Milwaukee	1–0	No. 14 Xavier
November 13	South Carolina	1–0	No. 10 North Carolina

=== Conference standings ===
2021 American Athletic Conference women's soccer standings
	Conf.						Overall
Team	W		L		T	PCT	W		L		T	PCT
South Florida ‍†‍‍^{y}	6	–	1	–	1	.813	12	–	4	–	3	.711
Houston ‍‍‍	5	–	2	–	1	.688	13	–	5	–	2	.700
No. 20 Memphis ‍‍‡‍^{y}	5	–	3	–	0	.625	14	–	5	–	2	.714
No. 21 SMU ‍‍‍^{y}	4	–	2	–	2	.625	12	–	5	–	2	.684
East Carolina ‍‍‍	3	–	3	–	2	.500	8	–	9	–	2	.474
UCF ‍‍‍	3	–	4	–	1	.438	8	–	7	–	1	.531
Cincinnati ‍‍‍	2	–	4	–	2	.375	7	–	7	–	3	.500
Temple ‍‍‍	2	–	6	–	0	.250	5	–	8	–	3	.406
Tulsa ‍‍‍	1	–	6	–	1	.188	6	–	9	–	2	.412
† – Conference champion ‡ – 2021 AAC Tournament champion y – Invited to the NCAA tournament As of December 7, 2021; Rankings from United Soccer Coaches Poll; Source:American Athletic Conference

2021 America East Conference women's soccer standings
	Conf.						Overall
Team	W		L		T	PCT	W		L		T	PCT
Vermont ‍†‍‡‍^{y}	7	–	2	–	0	.778	12	–	6	–	1	.658
UMass Lowell ‍‍‍	5	–	3	–	1	.611	8	–	6	–	3	.559
NJIT ‍‍‍	5	–	3	–	1	.611	7	–	10	–	2	.421
Binghamton ‍‍‍	4	–	3	–	2	.556	8	–	8	–	3	.500
Albany ‍‍‍	4	–	3	–	2	.556	6	–	8	–	4	.444
Stony Brook ‍‍‍	4	–	4	–	1	.500	7	–	8	–	2	.471
New Hampshire ‍‍‍	4	–	4	–	1	.500	6	–	9	–	4	.421
Hartford ‍‍‍	3	–	3	–	3	.500	8	–	4	–	4	.625
Maine ‍‍‍	1	–	6	–	2	.222	3	–	7	–	4	.357
UMBC ‍‍‍	1	–	7	–	1	.167	5	–	9	–	3	.382
† – Conference champion ‡ – 2021 America East Tournament champion y – Invited to the NCAA tournament As of December 7, 2021; Rankings from United Soccer Coaches Poll; Source:America East Conference

2021 Atlantic 10 Conference women's soccer standings
	Conf.						Overall
Team	W		L		T	PCT	W		L		T	PCT
VCU ‍†‍‍	9	–	1	–	0	.900	13	–	4	–	0	.765
Dayton ‍‍‍	8	–	2	–	0	.800	12	–	6	–	2	.650
Saint Louis ‍‍‡‍^{y}	7	–	3	–	0	.700	13	–	9	–	1	.587
UMass ‍‍‍	5	–	3	–	2	.600	11	–	6	–	4	.619
St. Bonaventure ‍‍‍	5	–	4	–	1	.550	7	–	8	–	4	.474
Rhode Island ‍‍‍	5	–	4	–	1	.550	6	–	9	–	2	.412
Richmond ‍‍‍	5	–	5	–	0	.500	7	–	10	–	1	.417
Saint Joseph's ‍‍‍	5	–	5	–	0	.500	6	–	12	–	2	.350
La Salle ‍‍‍	4	–	5	–	1	.450	6	–	9	–	2	.412
George Mason ‍‍‍	4	–	5	–	1	.450	6	–	11	–	1	.361
George Washington ‍‍‍	3	–	6	–	1	.350	3	–	12	–	2	.235
Duquesne ‍‍‍	2	–	7	–	1	.250	4	–	10	–	2	.313
Fordham ‍‍‍	2	–	7	–	1	.250	4	–	12	–	2	.278
Davidson ‍‍‍	0	–	7	–	3	.150	4	–	10	–	4	.333
† – Conference champion ‡ – 2021 Atlantic 10 Tournament champion y – Invited to the NCAA tournament As of December 7, 2021; Rankings from United Soccer Coaches Poll; Source:A10 Conference

2021 ASUN Conference women's soccer standings
	Conf.						Overall
Team	W		L		T	PCT	W		L		T	PCT
East
Florida Gulf Coast ‍†‍‍	7	–	2	–	0	.778	10	–	7	–	1	.583
Liberty ‍‍‍	6	–	3	–	0	.667	11	–	7	–	1	.605
Kennesaw State ‍‍‍	4	–	3	–	2	.556	9	–	8	–	2	.526
Jacksonville ‍‍‍	2	–	6	–	1	.278	7	–	8	–	3	.472
North Florida ‍‍‍	4	–	3	–	2	.556	9	–	4	–	3	.656
Stetson ‍‍‍	3	–	5	–	1	.389	6	–	10	–	2	.389
West
Lipscomb ‍†‍‡‍^{y}	7	–	2	–	0	.778	15	–	5	–	1	.738
Central Arkansas ‍‍‍	6	–	3	–	0	.667	9	–	9	–	0	.500
Eastern Kentucky ‍‍‍	4	–	5	–	0	.444	9	–	10	–	0	.474
Bellarmine ‍‍‍	2	–	5	–	2	.333	4	–	7	–	8	.421
Jacksonville State ‍‍‍	3	–	5	–	1	.389	7	–	10	–	2	.421
North Alabama ‍‍‍	1	–	7	–	1	.167	2	–	13	–	3	.194
† – Conference champion ‡ – 2021 ASUN tournament champion y – Invited to the NCAA tournament As of December 7, 2021; Rankings from United Soccer Coaches poll Source:ASUN Conference

2021 ACC women's soccer standings
	Conf.						Overall
Team	W		L		T	PCT	W		L		T	PCT
No. 8 Virginia ‍†‍‍^{y}	8	–	0	–	2	.900	18	–	3	–	2	.826
No. 1 Florida State ‍‍‡‍^{y}	7	–	1	–	2	.800	21	–	1	–	3	.900
No. 5 Duke ‍‍‍^{y}	7	–	2	–	1	.750	16	–	4	–	1	.786
No. 16 Notre Dame ‍‍‍^{y}	7	–	3	–	0	.700	14	–	6	–	2	.682
Clemson ‍‍‍^{y}	6	–	3	–	1	.650	12	–	7	–	1	.625
No. 14 North Carolina ‍‍‍^{y}	5	–	2	–	3	.650	12	–	3	–	3	.750
No. 25 Wake Forest ‍‍‍^{y}	6	–	4	–	0	.600	16	–	6	–	0	.727
Virginia Tech ‍‍‍^{y}	5	–	3	–	2	.600	12	–	6	–	2	.650
Pittsburgh ‍‍‍	4	–	6	–	0	.400	11	–	7	–	0	.611
NC State ‍‍‍^{y}	4	–	6	–	0	.400	9	–	9	–	2	.500
Louisville ‍‍‍	3	–	6	–	1	.350	7	–	7	–	2	.500
Boston College ‍‍‍	1	–	9	–	0	.100	7	–	10	–	1	.417
Miami (FL) ‍‍‍	1	–	9	–	0	.100	4	–	12	–	0	.250
Syracuse ‍‍‍	0	–	10	–	0	.000	4	–	12	–	1	.265
† – Conference champion ‡ – 2021 ACC Tournament champion y – Invited to the NCAA Tournament; As of December 7, 2021; Rankings from United Soccer Coaches Poll; Source: The ACC

2021 Big East Conference women's soccer standings
	Conf.						Overall
Team	W		L		T	PCT	W		L		T	PCT
No. 19 Xavier ‍†‍‍^{y}	9	–	1	–	0	.900	16	–	3	–	1	.825
No. 22 Georgetown ‍‍‡‍^{y}	7	–	1	–	2	.800	14	–	2	–	6	.773
Butler ‍‍‍^{y}	7	–	2	–	1	.750	15	–	5	–	1	.738
St. John's ‍‍‍^{y}	6	–	3	–	1	.650	13	–	7	–	3	.630
Providence ‍‍‍^{y}	5	–	3	–	2	.600	10	–	7	–	3	.575
UConn ‍‍‍	5	–	4	–	1	.550	9	–	8	–	1	.528
Marquette ‍‍‍	5	–	5	–	0	.500	9	–	8	–	0	.529
DePaul ‍‍‍	4	–	6	–	0	.400	7	–	11	–	0	.389
Creighton ‍‍‍	1	–	8	–	1	.150	7	–	10	–	2	.421
Villanova ‍‍‍	1	–	9	–	0	.100	7	–	11	–	0	.389
Seton Hall ‍‍‍	1	–	9	–	0	.100	6	–	12	–	0	.333
† – Conference champion ‡ – 2021 Big East Tournament champion y – Invited to the NCAA tournament As of December 7, 2021; Rankings from United Soccer Coaches Poll; Source:The Big East Conference

2021 Big Sky Conference women's soccer standings
	Conf.						Overall
Team	W		L		T	PCT	W		L		T	PCT
Northern Colorado ‍†‍‍	8	–	1	–	0	.889	10	–	8	–	2	.550
Montana ‍‍‡‍^{y}	7	–	1	–	1	.833	13	–	5	–	1	.711
Weber State ‍‍‍	6	–	3	–	0	.667	11	–	9	–	0	.550
Northern Arizona ‍‍‍	6	–	3	–	0	.667	8	–	11	–	0	.421
Idaho ‍‍‍	4	–	4	–	1	.500	10	–	5	–	2	.647
Sacramento State ‍‍‍	3	–	6	–	0	.333	5	–	11	–	2	.333
Eastern Washington ‍‍‍	3	–	6	–	0	.333	5	–	12	–	0	.294
Portland State ‍‍‍	2	–	5	–	2	.333	4	–	10	–	2	.313
Idaho State ‍‍‍	2	–	7	–	0	.222	2	–	16	–	1	.132
Southern Utah ‍‍‍	1	–	6	–	2	.222	2	–	13	–	2	.176
† – Conference champion ‡ – 2021 Big Sky Tournament champion y – Invited to the NCAA Tournament; As of December 7, 2021; Rankings from United Soccer Coaches Poll; Source:The Big Sky Conference

2021 Big South Conference women's soccer standings
	Conf.						Overall
Team	W		L		T	PCT	W		L		T	PCT
Campbell ‍†‍‍	9	–	1	–	0	.900	12	–	4	–	2	.722
High Point ‍‍‡‍^{y}	8	–	2	–	0	.800	10	–	8	–	2	.550
Longwood ‍‍‍	6	–	2	–	2	.700	8	–	8	–	4	.500
Radford ‍‍‍	6	–	3	–	1	.650	13	–	5	–	1	.711
Charleston Southern ‍‍‍	5	–	5	–	0	.500	6	–	8	–	1	.433
Gardner–Webb ‍‍‍	5	–	5	–	0	.500	8	–	12	–	0	.400
UNC Asheville ‍‍‍	5	–	5	–	0	.500	6	–	11	–	1	.361
Winthrop ‍‍‍	4	–	5	–	1	.450	6	–	7	–	2	.467
USC Upstate ‍‍‍	4	–	6	–	0	.400	6	–	9	–	1	.406
Hampton ‍‍‍	0	–	9	–	1	.050	1	–	13	–	1	.100
Presbyterian ‍‍‍	0	–	9	–	1	.050	1	–	16	–	1	.083
† – Conference champion ‡ – 2021 Big South Tournament champion y – Invited to the NCAA tournament As of December 7, 2021; Rankings from United Soccer Coaches Poll; Source:Big South Conference

2021 Big Ten Conference women's soccer standings
	Conf.						Overall
Team	W		L		T	PCT	W		L		T	PCT
No. 3 Rutgers ‍†‍‍^{y}	10	–	0	–	0	1.000	19	–	3	–	2	.833
No. 24 Purdue ‍‍‍^{y}	8	–	2	–	0	.800	15	–	4	–	3	.750
No. 7 Michigan ‍‍‡‍^{y}	6	–	2	–	2	.700	18	–	4	–	3	.780
Michigan State ‍‍‍	5	–	4	–	1	.550	10	–	5	–	3	.639
Iowa ‍‍‍	5	–	4	–	1	.550	12	–	6	–	2	.650
No. 23 Penn State ‍‍‍^{y}	5	–	5	–	0	.500	12	–	8	–	1	.595
Ohio State ‍‍‍^{y}	3	–	4	–	2	.444	9	–	9	–	2	.500
Wisconsin ‍‍‍^{y}	3	–	3	–	4	.500	10	–	6	–	6	.591
Indiana ‍‍‍	3	–	4	–	3	.450	9	–	5	–	4	.611
Minnesota ‍‍‍	4	–	6	–	0	.400	8	–	6	–	3	.559
Nebraska ‍‍‍	3	–	5	–	2	.400	7	–	9	–	2	.444
Northwestern ‍‍‍	3	–	5	–	1	.389	7	–	9	–	1	.441
Illinois ‍‍‍	1	–	8	–	1	.150	5	–	11	–	1	.324
Maryland ‍‍‍	0	–	7	–	3	.150	4	–	9	–	5	.361
† – Conference champion ‡ – 2021 Big Ten Tournament champion y – Invited to the NCAA tournament As of December 7, 2021; Rankings from United Soccer Coaches Poll; Source:2021 Women's Soccer Standings

2021 Big West Conference women's soccer standings
	Conf.						Overall
Team	W		L		T	PCT	W		L		T	PCT
UC Irvine ‍†‍‡‍^{y}	8	–	2	–	0	.800	16	–	6	–	0	.727
Cal Poly ‍‍‍	8	–	2	–	0	.800	13	–	8	–	0	.619
Cal State Fullerton ‍‍‍	7	–	3	–	0	.700	10	–	10	–	0	.500
UC Santa Barbara ‍‍‍	6	–	3	–	1	.650	8	–	9	–	3	.475
Long Beach State ‍‍‍	6	–	3	–	1	.650	9	–	7	–	2	.556
UC Davis ‍‍‍	5	–	5	–	0	.500	10	–	8	–	0	.556
UC San Diego ‍‍‍	3	–	5	–	1	.389	5	–	10	–	2	.353
Hawaii ‍‍‍	2	–	5	–	2	.333	2	–	9	–	3	.250
Cal State Bakersfield ‍‍‍	2	–	7	–	1	.250	3	–	14	–	2	.211
Cal State Northridge ‍‍‍	2	–	8	–	0	.200	3	–	17	–	0	.150
UC Riverside ‍‍‍	1	–	7	–	2	.200	4	–	11	–	2	.294
† – Conference champion ‡ – 2021 Big West Tournament champion y – Invited to the NCAA tournament As of December 7, 2021; Rankings from United Soccer Coaches Poll; Source:The Big West Conference

2021 Big 12 Conference women's soccer standings
	Conf.						Overall
Team	W		L		T	PCT	W		L		T	PCT
No. 9 TCU ‍†‍‡‍^{y}	7	–	1	–	1	.833	19	–	2	–	2	.870
Texas ‍‍‍^{y}	6	–	0	–	3	.833	11	–	5	–	6	.636
Baylor ‍‍‍	4	–	2	–	3	.611	8	–	5	–	6	.579
Oklahoma State ‍‍‍	4	–	3	–	1	.563	9	–	6	–	3	.583
Texas Tech ‍‍‍	4	–	4	–	1	.500	11	–	6	–	3	.625
West Virginia ‍‍‍	3	–	3	–	3	.500	10	–	5	–	5	.625
Oklahoma ‍‍‍	4	–	5	–	0	.444	8	–	11	–	1	.425
Iowa State ‍‍‍	2	–	6	–	0	.250	5	–	11	–	1	.324
Kansas ‍‍‍	2	–	7	–	0	.222	7	–	11	–	1	.395
Kansas State ‍‍‍	1	–	6	–	2	.222	6	–	10	–	2	.389
† – Conference champion ‡ – 2021 Big 12 Tournament champion y – Invited to the NCAA Tournament; As of December 7, 2021; Rankings from United Soccer Coaches Poll; Source: The Big 12 Conference

2021 Colonial Athletic Association women's soccer standings
	Conf.						Overall
Team	W		L		T	PCT	W		L		T	PCT
UNC Wilmington ‍†‍‍	7	–	2	–	0	.778	11	–	4	–	1	.719
Hofstra ‍‍‡‍^{y}	6	–	2	–	1	.722	17	–	4	–	1	.795
James Madison ‍‍‍	6	–	3	–	0	.667	9	–	9	–	1	.500
Northeastern ‍‍‍	5	–	4	–	0	.556	9	–	9	–	1	.500
Elon ‍‍‍	4	–	3	–	2	.556	9	–	6	–	2	.588
Towson ‍‍‍	3	–	5	–	1	.389	8	–	7	–	3	.528
William & Mary ‍‍‍	2	–	4	–	3	.389	4	–	9	–	3	.344
Drexel ‍‍‍	2	–	5	–	2	.333	6	–	8	–	3	.441
Delaware ‍‍‍	2	–	5	–	2	.333	5	–	11	–	2	.333
College of Charleston ‍‍‍	2	–	6	–	1	.278	3	–	12	–	3	.250
† – Conference champion ‡ – 2021 CAA Tournament champion y – Invited to the NCAA Tournament; As of December 7, 2021; Rankings from United Soccer Coaches Poll; Source:Colonial Athletic Association

2021 Conference USA women's soccer standings
	Conf.						Overall
Team	W		L		T	PCT	W		L		T	PCT
East
Old Dominion ‍†‍‡‍^{y}	6	–	1	–	1	.813	13	–	5	–	1	.711
Western Kentucky ‍‍‍	5	–	2	–	1	.688	10	–	5	–	1	.656
Middle Tennessee ‍‍‍	5	–	3	–	0	.625	10	–	8	–	1	.553
Florida Atlantic ‍‍‍	4	–	2	–	2	.625	6	–	7	–	5	.472
Charlotte ‍‍‍	3	–	2	–	3	.563	7	–	5	–	4	.563
FIU ‍‍‍	1	–	5	–	2	.250	2	–	12	–	2	.188
Marshall ‍‍‍	0	–	7	–	1	.063	3	–	11	–	2	.250
West
Southern Miss ‍‍‍	4	–	1	–	3	.688	10	–	4	–	3	.676
Rice ‍‍‍	4	–	3	–	1	.563	10	–	6	–	2	.611
UAB ‍‍‍	4	–	3	–	1	.563	7	–	9	–	3	.447
UTSA ‍‍‍	3	–	2	–	3	.563	10	–	5	–	4	.632
North Texas ‍‍‍	3	–	3	–	2	.500	8	–	5	–	4	.588
Louisiana Tech ‍‍‍	2	–	4	–	2	.375	6	–	8	–	3	.441
UTEP ‍‍‍	1	–	7	–	0	.125	4	–	12	–	0	.250
† – Conference champion ‡ – 2021 C-USA Tournament champion y – Invited to the NCAA tournament As of December 7, 2021; Rankings from United Soccer Coaches Poll; Source:Conference USA

2021 Horizon League women's soccer standings
	Conf.						Overall
Team	W		L		T	PCT	W		L		T	PCT
Milwaukee ‍†‍‡‍^{y}	11	–	0	–	0	1.000	18	–	1	–	0	.947
Oakland ‍‍‍	9	–	1	–	1	.864	11	–	9	–	1	.548
Northern Kentucky ‍‍‍	7	–	4	–	0	.636	10	–	8	–	2	.550
Green Bay ‍‍‍	4	–	2	–	5	.591	8	–	3	–	6	.647
Cleveland State ‍‍‍	5	–	5	–	1	.500	6	–	11	–	2	.368
Purdue Fort Wayne ‍‍‍	4	–	5	–	2	.455	5	–	8	–	6	.421
Wright State ‍‍‍	3	–	6	–	2	.364	5	–	10	–	3	.361
IUPUI ‍‍‍	3	–	6	–	2	.364	4	–	11	–	3	.306
Youngstown State ‍‍‍	2	–	5	–	4	.364	2	–	11	–	5	.250
Robert Morris ‍‍‍	2	–	6	–	3	.318	6	–	10	–	3	.395
Detroit Mercy ‍‍‍	2	–	7	–	2	.273	3	–	13	–	2	.222
UIC ‍‍‍	2	–	7	–	2	.273	2	–	12	–	3	.206
† – Conference champion ‡ – 2021 Horizon League Tournament champion y – Invited to the NCAA tournament As of December 7, 2021; Rankings from United Soccer Coaches Poll; Source:Horizon League

2021 Ivy League women's soccer standings
	Conf.						Overall
Team	W		L		T	PCT	W		L		T	PCT
Brown ‍†‍‍^{y}	7	–	0	–	0	1.000	12	–	4	–	0	.750
Princeton ‍‍‍^{y}	6	–	1	–	0	.857	15	–	3	–	1	.816
Harvard ‍‍‍^{y}	5	–	2	–	0	.714	12	–	3	–	1	.781
Columbia ‍‍‍	3	–	4	–	0	.429	9	–	6	–	1	.594
Penn ‍‍‍	3	–	4	–	0	.429	9	–	5	–	2	.625
Dartmouth ‍‍‍	2	–	5	–	0	.286	7	–	7	–	1	.500
Cornell ‍‍‍	1	–	6	–	0	.143	3	–	11	–	2	.250
Yale ‍‍‍	1	–	6	–	0	.143	2	–	14	–	0	.125
† – Conference champion y – Invited to the NCAA Tournament; As of December 7, 2021; Rankings from United Soccer Coaches Poll; Source:Ivy League

2021 Mid-American Conference women's soccer standings
	Conf.						Overall
Team	W		L		T	PCT	W		L		T	PCT
Bowling Green ‍†‍‡‍^{y}	8	–	2	–	1	.773	11	–	6	–	3	.625
Kent State ‍‍‍	7	–	1	–	3	.773	13	–	5	–	3	.690
Ohio ‍‍‍	7	–	1	–	3	.773	11	–	5	–	3	.658
Buffalo ‍‍‍	6	–	2	–	3	.682	13	–	4	–	3	.725
Central Michigan ‍‍‍	6	–	4	–	1	.591	9	–	8	–	1	.528
Toledo ‍‍‍	5	–	4	–	2	.545	10	–	6	–	4	.600
Miami (OH) ‍‍‍	5	–	6	–	0	.455	8	–	8	–	3	.500
Ball State ‍‍‍	4	–	5	–	2	.455	6	–	9	–	2	.412
Western Michigan ‍‍‍	4	–	7	–	0	.364	6	–	12	–	0	.333
Northern Illinois ‍‍‍	2	–	7	–	2	.273	5	–	12	–	2	.316
Eastern Michigan ‍‍‍	1	–	8	–	2	.182	2	–	13	–	3	.194
Akron ‍‍‍	1	–	9	–	1	.136	3	–	15	–	1	.184
† – Conference champion ‡ – 2021 MAC Tournament champion y – Invited to the NCAA tournament As of December 7, 2021; Rankings from United Soccer Coaches Poll; Source:Mid-American Conference

2021 MAAC women's soccer standings
	Conf.						Overall
Team	W		L		T	PCT	W		L		T	PCT
Monmouth ‍†‍‡‍^{y}	8	–	1	–	1	.850	15	–	4	–	1	.775
Quinnipiac ‍‍‍	7	–	3	–	0	.700	13	–	4	–	1	.750
Niagara ‍‍‍	7	–	3	–	0	.700	13	–	4	–	1	.750
Siena ‍‍‍	6	–	4	–	0	.600	9	–	9	–	1	.500
Iona ‍‍‍	6	–	4	–	0	.600	11	–	8	–	0	.579
Fairfield ‍‍‍	5	–	4	–	1	.550	9	–	6	–	4	.579
Marist ‍‍‍	4	–	4	–	2	.500	5	–	7	–	3	.433
Rider ‍‍‍	3	–	6	–	1	.350	5	–	10	–	2	.353
Manhattan ‍‍‍	3	–	6	–	1	.350	7	–	7	–	1	.500
St. Peter's ‍‍‍	3	–	7	–	0	.300	3	–	13	–	0	.188
Canisius ‍‍‍	0	–	10	–	0	.000	0	–	15	–	2	.059
† – Conference champion ‡ – 2021 MAAC Tournament champion y – Invited to the NCAA Tournament; As of December 7, 2021; Rankings from United Soccer Coaches Poll; Source:MAAC

2021 Missouri Valley Conference women's soccer standings
	Conf.						Overall
Team	W		L		T	PCT	W		L		T	PCT
Loyola–Chicago ‍†‍‡‍^{y}	7	–	0	–	1	.938	13	–	3	–	2	.778
Valparaiso ‍‍‍	6	–	1	–	1	.813	10	–	6	–	2	.611
Indiana State ‍‍‍	4	–	2	–	2	.625	6	–	7	–	4	.471
Northern Iowa ‍‍‍	3	–	4	–	1	.438	6	–	10	–	2	.389
Drake ‍‍‍	2	–	3	–	3	.438	8	–	7	–	5	.525
Evansville ‍‍‍	2	–	3	–	3	.438	7	–	5	–	7	.553
Illinois State ‍‍‍	2	–	3	–	3	.438	4	–	10	–	3	.324
Missouri State ‍‍‍	2	–	4	–	2	.375	5	–	7	–	5	.441
Southern Illinois ‍‍‍	0	–	8	–	0	.000	0	–	15	–	1	.031
† – Conference champion ‡ – 2021 Missouri Valley Tournament champion y – Invited to the NCAA tournament As of December 7, 2021; Rankings from United Soccer Coaches Poll; Source:Missouri Valley Conference

2021 Mountain West Conference women's soccer standings
	Conf.						Overall
Team	W		L		T	PCT	W		L		T	PCT
New Mexico ‍†‍‡‍^{y}	7	–	2	–	2	.727	14	–	5	–	2	.714
Fresno State ‍‍‍	7	–	3	–	1	.682	9	–	6	–	4	.579
San Diego State ‍‍‍	5	–	4	–	2	.545	7	–	11	–	2	.400
Utah State ‍‍‍	5	–	4	–	2	.545	13	–	6	–	3	.659
Colorado State ‍‍‍	5	–	5	–	1	.500	6	–	8	–	3	.441
Boise State ‍‍‍	4	–	4	–	3	.500	11	–	7	–	4	.591
Colorado College ‍‍‍	4	–	4	–	3	.500	5	–	10	–	3	.361
UNLV ‍‍‍	5	–	6	–	0	.455	12	–	8	–	0	.600
Nevada ‍‍‍	4	–	5	–	2	.455	5	–	11	–	2	.333
San Jose State ‍‍‍	4	–	6	–	1	.409	7	–	11	–	1	.395
Wyoming ‍‍‍	4	–	7	–	0	.364	8	–	10	–	1	.447
Air Force ‍‍‍	3	–	7	–	1	.318	6	–	10	–	2	.389
† – Conference champion ‡ – 2021 MW Tournament champion y – Invited to the NCAA tournament As of December 7, 2021; Rankings from United Soccer Coaches Poll; Source:Mountain West Conference

2021 Northeast Conference women's soccer standings
	Conf.						Overall
Team	W		L		T	PCT	W		L		T	PCT
Central Connecticut ‍†‍‡‍^{y}	8	–	2	–	0	.800	13	–	6	–	0	.684
Fairleigh Dickinson ‍‍‍	6	–	2	–	2	.700	10	–	6	–	4	.600
Sacred Heart ‍‍‍	6	–	3	–	1	.650	8	–	7	–	2	.529
Bryant ‍‍‍	6	–	4	–	0	.600	8	–	10	–	0	.444
Howard ‍‍‍	5	–	3	–	2	.600	6	–	5	–	3	.536
Wagner ‍‍‍	5	–	5	–	0	.500	8	–	10	–	0	.444
St. Francis Brooklyn ‍‍‍	3	–	4	–	3	.450	5	–	7	–	6	.444
Merrimack ‍‍‍	4	–	6	–	0	.400	5	–	11	–	2	.333
Mount St. Mary's ‍‍‍	3	–	7	–	0	.300	5	–	13	–	0	.278
Saint Francis (PA) ‍‍‍	2	–	7	–	1	.250	4	–	12	–	1	.265
LIU ‍‍‍	2	–	7	–	1	.250	2	–	11	–	2	.200
† – Conference champion ‡ – 2021 NEC Tournament champion y – Invited to the NCAA tournament As of December 7, 2021; Rankings from United Soccer Coaches Poll; Source:Northeast Conference

2021 Ohio Valley Conference women's soccer standings
	Conf.						Overall
Team	W		L		T	PCT	W		L		T	PCT
UT Martin ‍†‍‍	6	–	2	–	0	.750	11	–	6	–	1	.639
SIU Edwardsville ‍†‍‡‍^{y}	6	–	2	–	0	.750	11	–	7	–	0	.611
Belmont ‍‍‍	5	–	3	–	0	.625	8	–	8	–	1	.500
Murray State ‍‍‍	4	–	3	–	1	.563	9	–	8	–	1	.528
Tennessee Tech ‍‍‍	3	–	2	–	3	.563	6	–	6	–	4	.500
Southeast Missouri State ‍‍‍	2	–	4	–	2	.375	7	–	10	–	2	.421
Morehead State ‍‍‍	2	–	4	–	2	.375	4	–	10	–	4	.333
Eastern Illinois ‍‍‍	2	–	5	–	1	.313	4	–	11	–	2	.294
Austin Peay ‍‍‍	1	–	6	–	1	.188	4	–	10	–	3	.324
† – Conference champion ‡ – 2021 OVC Tournament champion y – Invited to the NCAA tournament As of December 7, 2021; Rankings from United Soccer Coaches Poll; Source:Ohio Valley Conference

2021 Pac-12 Conference women's soccer standings
	Conf.						Overall
Team	W		L		T	PCT	W		L		T	PCT
No. 15 UCLA ‍†‍‍^{y}	8	–	0	–	3	.864	16	–	1	–	3	.875
No. 12 USC ‍‍‍^{y}	8	–	1	–	2	.818	14	–	3	–	3	.775
No. 17 Washington State ‍‍‍^{y}	7	–	1	–	3	.773	14	–	3	–	4	.762
Stanford ‍‍‍^{y}	6	–	3	–	1	.650	13	–	6	–	1	.675
Oregon ‍‍‍	4	–	4	–	3	.500	9	–	4	–	6	.632
Washington ‍‍‍	4	–	4	–	3	.500	6	–	8	–	4	.444
Colorado ‍‍‍	3	–	4	–	4	.455	8	–	7	–	4	.526
California ‍‍‍	4	–	5	–	1	.450	8	–	7	–	3	.528
Oregon State ‍‍‍	3	–	7	–	1	.318	11	–	7	–	1	.605
Arizona State ‍‍‍	2	–	7	–	2	.273	10	–	8	–	2	.550
Utah ‍‍‍	1	–	7	–	3	.227	6	–	10	–	4	.400
Arizona ‍‍‍	2	–	9	–	0	.182	5	–	13	–	0	.278
† – Conference champion y – Invited to the NCAA Tournament; As of December 7, 2021; Rankings from United Soccer Coaches Poll; Source:Pac 12

2021 Patriot League women's soccer standings
	Conf.						Overall
Team	W		L		T	PCT	W		L		T	PCT
Boston University ‍†‍‍	6	–	1	–	2	.778	11	–	6	–	3	.625
Navy ‍‍‍	6	–	2	–	1	.722	11	–	6	–	3	.625
Loyola (MD) ‍‍‍	5	–	1	–	3	.722	8	–	6	–	4	.556
Bucknell ‍‍‡‍^{y}	5	–	2	–	2	.667	11	–	8	–	3	.568
Lehigh ‍‍‍	4	–	4	–	1	.500	6	–	10	–	1	.382
Colgate ‍‍‍	3	–	4	–	2	.444	7	–	8	–	2	.471
Army ‍‍‍	3	–	4	–	2	.444	7	–	9	–	3	.447
Lafayette ‍‍‍	3	–	6	–	0	.333	5	–	10	–	0	.333
American ‍‍‍	2	–	5	–	2	.333	5	–	9	–	2	.375
Holy Cross ‍‍‍	0	–	8	–	1	.056	1	–	15	–	1	.088
† – Conference champion ‡ – 2021 Patriot League tournament champion y – Invited to the NCAA tournament As of December 7, 2021; Rankings from United Soccer Coaches Poll; Source:Patriot League

2021 SEC women's soccer standings
	Conf.						Overall
Team	W		L		T	PCT	W		L		T	PCT
East
No. 11 Tennessee ‍‍‡‍^{y}	8	–	2	–	0	.800	20	–	3	–	0	.870
No. 10 South Carolina ‍‍‍^{y}	6	–	3	–	1	.650	14	–	7	–	1	.659
Vanderbilt ‍‍‍	5	–	4	–	1	.550	8	–	8	–	3	.500
Georgia ‍‍‍	4	–	4	–	2	.500	11	–	5	–	3	.658
Florida ‍‍‍	3	–	6	–	1	.350	4	–	12	–	4	.300
Missouri ‍‍‍	3	–	7	–	0	.300	6	–	11	–	0	.353
Kentucky ‍‍‍	1	–	9	–	0	.100	7	–	10	–	2	.421
West
No. 6 Arkansas ‍†‍‍^{y}	9	–	1	–	0	.900	19	–	4	–	1	.813
No. 18 Ole Miss ‍‍‍^{y}	6	–	3	–	1	.650	12	–	6	–	3	.643
Auburn ‍‍‍^{y}	5	–	4	–	1	.550	12	–	7	–	1	.625
Alabama ‍‍‍^{y}	5	–	4	–	1	.550	11	–	10	–	1	.523
Texas A&M ‍‍‍	4	–	5	–	1	.450	8	–	8	–	2	.500
LSU ‍‍‍^{y}	4	–	6	–	0	.400	11	–	8	–	1	.575
Mississippi State ‍‍‍	3	–	6	–	1	.350	5	–	8	–	3	.406
† – Conference champion ‡ – 2021 SEC Tournament champion y – Invited to the NCAA tournament As of December 7, 2021; Rankings from United Soccer Coaches Poll; Source:SEC

2021 Southern Conference women's soccer standings
	Conf.						Overall
Team	W		L		T	PCT	W		L		T	PCT
Samford ‍†‍‡‍^{y}	9	–	0	–	0	1.000	16	–	3	–	3	.795
Furman ‍‍‍	6	–	3	–	0	.667	12	–	6	–	1	.658
Western Carolina ‍‍‍	5	–	4	–	0	.556	11	–	8	–	1	.575
Mercer ‍‍‍	3	–	2	–	4	.556	7	–	6	–	5	.528
East Tennessee State ‍‍‍	4	–	4	–	1	.500	7	–	6	–	3	.531
The Citadel ‍‍‍	3	–	4	–	2	.444	10	–	7	–	2	.579
UNC Greensboro ‍‍‍	3	–	4	–	2	.444	4	–	8	–	6	.389
Chattanooga ‍‍‍	3	–	5	–	1	.389	6	–	11	–	3	.375
Wofford ‍‍‍	3	–	5	–	1	.389	5	–	12	–	2	.316
VMI ‍‍‍	0	–	8	–	1	.056	3	–	16	–	1	.175
† – Conference champion ‡ – 2021 Southern Tournament champion y – Invited to the NCAA tournament As of December 7, 2021; Rankings from United Soccer Coaches Poll; Source:SoCon

2021 Southland Conference women's soccer standings
	Conf.						Overall
Team	W		L		T	PCT	W		L		T	PCT
Northwestern State ‍†‍‡‍^{y}	10	–	2	–	0	.833	12	–	6	–	2	.650
McNeese State ‍‍‍	9	–	2	–	1	.792	13	–	5	–	2	.700
Incarnate Word ‍‍‍	7	–	4	–	1	.625	9	–	10	–	2	.476
Texas A&M–Corpus Christi ‍‍‍	5	–	6	–	1	.458	7	–	11	–	1	.395
Southeastern Louisiana ‍‍‍	4	–	5	–	3	.458	7	–	9	–	3	.447
Houston Baptist ‍‍‍	4	–	8	–	0	.333	4	–	14	–	1	.237
Nicholls ‍‍‍	0	–	12	–	0	.000	0	–	18	–	0	.000
† – Conference champion ‡ – 2021 Southland Tournament champion y – Invited to the NCAA Tournament; As of December 7, 2021; Rankings from United Soccer Coaches Poll; Source:Southland Conference

2021 SWAC women's soccer standings
	Conf.						Overall
Team	W		L		T	PCT	W		L		T	PCT
Prairie View A&M ‍†‍‡‍^{y}	8	–	1	–	0	.889	11	–	4	–	2	.706
Alabama A&M ‍†‍‍	8	–	1	–	0	.889	10	–	8	–	1	.553
Grambling State ‍‍‍	6	–	2	–	1	.722	9	–	7	–	2	.556
Alabama State ‍‍‍	5	–	3	–	1	.611	7	–	9	–	3	.447
Texas Southern ‍‍‍	4	–	2	–	3	.611	5	–	7	–	3	.433
Jackson State ‍‍‍	3	–	3	–	3	.500	4	–	11	–	3	.306
Southern ‍‍‍	3	–	5	–	1	.389	5	–	9	–	2	.375
Arkansas–Pine Bluff ‍‍‍	2	–	7	–	0	.222	6	–	13	–	0	.316
Alcorn State ‍‍‍	1	–	7	–	1	.167	3	–	14	–	2	.211
Mississippi Valley State ‍‍‍	0	–	9	–	0	.000	1	–	12	–	0	.077
† – Conference champion ‡ – 2021 SWAC Tournament champion y – Invited to the NCAA tournament As of December 7, 2021; Rankings from United Soccer Coaches Poll; Source: SWAC

2021 Sun Belt Conference women's soccer standings
	Conf.						Overall
Team	W		L		T	PCT	W		L		T	PCT
Arkansas State ‍†‍‍	7	–	2	–	1	.750	10	–	6	–	2	.611
South Alabama ‍‍‡‍^{y}	6	–	2	–	2	.700	12	–	5	–	3	.675
Georgia State ‍‍‍	4	–	1	–	5	.650	10	–	4	–	6	.650
Georgia Southern ‍‍‍	4	–	3	–	3	.550	11	–	7	–	4	.591
Coastal Carolina ‍‍‍	4	–	5	–	1	.450	6	–	9	–	2	.412
Texas State ‍‍‍	4	–	5	–	1	.450	7	–	7	–	2	.500
Little Rock ‍‍‍	3	–	4	–	3	.450	7	–	7	–	6	.500
Louisiana–Monroe ‍‍‍	4	–	6	–	0	.400	8	–	12	–	0	.400
Troy ‍‍‍	4	–	6	–	0	.400	8	–	10	–	1	.447
Louisiana ‍‍‍	3	–	5	–	2	.400	6	–	10	–	3	.395
Appalachian State ‍‍‍	2	–	8	–	0	.200	7	–	11	–	1	.395
† – Conference champion ‡ – 2021 Sun Belt Tournament champion y – Invited to the NCAA Tournament; As of December 7, 2021; Rankings from United Soccer Coaches Poll; Source:Sun Belt

2021 Summit League women's soccer standings
	Conf.						Overall
Team	W		L		T	PCT	W		L		T	PCT
Denver ‍†‍‍	8	–	0	–	1	.944	13	–	6	–	2	.667
South Dakota State ‍‍‡‍^{y}	6	–	2	–	1	.722	17	–	4	–	1	.795
Omaha ‍‍‍	6	–	3	–	0	.667	9	–	8	–	2	.526
South Dakota ‍‍‍	5	–	3	–	1	.611	10	–	4	–	4	.667
Western Illinois ‍‍‍	5	–	4	–	0	.556	11	–	6	–	1	.639
Kansas City ‍‍‍	4	–	5	–	0	.444	6	–	13	–	0	.316
Oral Roberts ‍‍‍	3	–	5	–	1	.389	6	–	10	–	2	.389
North Dakota State ‍‍‍	3	–	6	–	0	.333	3	–	12	–	1	.219
St. Thomas ‍‍‍	2	–	7	–	0	.222	4	–	12	–	1	.265
North Dakota ‍‍‍	1	–	8	–	0	.111	3	–	13	–	1	.206
† – Conference champion ‡ – 2021 Summit League Tournament champion y – Invited to the NCAA tournament As of December 7, 2021; Rankings from United Soccer Coaches Poll; Source:Summit League

2021 West Coast Conference women's soccer standings
	Conf.						Overall
Team	W		L		T	PCT	W		L		T	PCT
No. 2 BYU ‍†‍‍^{y}	8	–	1	–	0	.889	17	–	4	–	3	.771
No. 4 Santa Clara ‍†‍‍^{y}	8	–	1	–	0	.889	15	–	5	–	3	.717
No. 13 Pepperdine ‍‍‍^{y}	6	–	2	–	1	.722	17	–	4	–	1	.795
Gonzaga ‍‍‍	5	–	4	–	0	.556	15	–	5	–	0	.750
Saint Mary's ‍‍‍	4	–	3	–	2	.556	10	–	4	–	4	.667
Portland ‍‍‍	4	–	4	–	0	.500	8	–	8	–	0	.500
Pacific ‍‍‍	2	–	4	–	2	.375	10	–	5	–	3	.639
San Francisco ‍‍‍	2	–	6	–	0	.250	6	–	9	–	2	.412
San Diego ‍‍‍	1	–	6	–	1	.188	6	–	10	–	1	.382
Loyola Marymount ‍‍‍	0	–	9	–	0	.000	0	–	19	–	0	.000
† – Conference champion y – Invited to the NCAA tournament As of December 7, 2021; Rankings from United Soccer Coaches Poll; Source:West Coast Conference

2021 WAC women's soccer standings
	Conf.						Overall
Team	W		L		T	PCT	W		L		T	PCT
Southwest
Stephen F. Austin ‍†‍‍	8	–	2	–	0	.800	10	–	8	–	1	.553
Lamar ‍‍‍	6	–	2	–	2	.700	10	–	8	–	2	.550
Sam Houston State ‍‍‍	6	–	4	–	0	.600	8	–	10	–	0	.444
Abilene Christian ‍‍‍	4	–	5	–	1	.450	6	–	9	–	1	.406
Texas–Rio Grande Valley ‍‍‍	2	–	7	–	1	.250	6	–	12	–	2	.350
Chicago State ‍‍‍	2	–	8	–	0	.200	2	–	14	–	1	.147
West
Grand Canyon ‍†‍‡‍^{y}	7	–	1	–	2	.800	16	–	4	–	2	.773
Utah Valley ‍‍‍	6	–	2	–	2	.700	13	–	7	–	2	.636
New Mexico State ‍‍‍	5	–	5	–	0	.500	9	–	11	–	0	.450
California Baptist* ‍‍‍	4	–	4	–	2	.500	6	–	8	–	3	.441
Dixie State* ‍‍‍	2	–	7	–	1	.250	6	–	13	–	1	.325
Seattle ‍‍‍	1	–	6	–	3	.250	7	–	8	–	4	.474
† – Conference champion ‡ – 2021 WAC Tournament champion y – Invited to the NCAA Tournament * ineligible for the 2021 NCAA Tournament due to transition from Division II; As of December 7, 2021; Rankings from United Soccer Coaches Poll; Source:WAC

=== Conference winners and tournaments ===
Conference	Regular Season Champion(s)	Tournament Winner	Conference Tournament	Tournament Dates	Tournament Venue (City)
ACC	Virginia	Florida State	2021 Tournament	October 31–November 7	Quarterfinals: Campus sites, hosted by higher seed Semifinals and final: WakeMed Soccer Park • Cary, North Carolina
America East	Vermont		2021 Tournament	October 31–November 7	Campus sites, hosted by higher seed
American	South Florida	Memphis	2021 Tournament	October 31–November 7	Quarterfinals: Campus sites, hosted by higher seed Semifinals and final: Hosted by regular-season champion
ASUN	Florida Gulf Coast (East)	Lipscomb	2021 Tournament (Note: Not to be confused with the 2020–21 ASUN tournament, which the conference officially branded as the "2021 Spring" edition.)	October 29–November 6	Campus sites, hosted by higher seed
ASUN	Lipscomb (West)	Lipscomb	2021 Tournament	October 29–November 6	Campus sites, hosted by higher seed
Atlantic 10	VCU	Saint Louis	2021 Tournament	October 30–November 7	Quarterfinals: Campus sites, hosted by higher seed Semifinals and final: Hosted by top remaining seed
Big 12	TCU		2021 Tournament	October 31–November 7	Round Rock Multipurpose Complex • Round Rock, Texas
Big East	Xavier	Georgetown	2021 Tournament	October 31–November 7	Quarterfinals: Campus sites, hosted by higher seed Semifinals and final: Hosted by regular-season champion
Big Sky	Northern Colorado	Montana	2021 Tournament	November 3–7	Jackson Stadium • Greeley, Colorado
Big South	Campbell	High Point	2021 Tournament	October 30–November 7	Campus sites, hosted by higher seed
Big Ten	Rutgers	Michigan	2021 Tournament	October 31–November 7	Quarterfinals: Campus sites, hosted by higher seed Semifinals and final: Hosted by top remaining seed
Big West	UC Irvine		2021 Tournament	November 4–7	Hosted by regular-season champion
CAA	UNC Wilmington	Hofstra	2021 Tournament	November 4–7	Rudd Field • Elon, North Carolina
C-USA	Old Dominion (East)	Old Dominion	2021 Tournament	November 1–7	FAU Soccer Stadium • Boca Raton, Florida
C-USA	Southern Miss (West)	Old Dominion	2021 Tournament	November 1–7	FAU Soccer Stadium • Boca Raton, Florida
Horizon	Milwaukee		2021 Tournament	October 31–November 6	Quarterfinals: Campus sites, hosted by higher seed Semifinals and final: Hosted by regular-season champion
Ivy	Brown	No Tournament			
MAAC	Monmouth		2021 Tournament	October 31–November 7	Campus sites, hosted by higher seed
MAC	Bowling Green		2021 Tournament	October 31–November 7	Campus sites, hosted by higher seed
Missouri Valley	Loyola Chicago		2021 Tournament	October 31–November 7	Quarterfinals: Campus sites, hosted by higher seed Semifinals and final: Hosted by regular-season champion
Mountain West	New Mexico		2021 Tournament	November 1–6	Boas Tennis and Soccer Complex • Boise, Idaho
Northeast	Central Connecticut		2021 Tournament	November 5–7	Hosted by regular-season champion
Ohio Valley	SIU Edwardsville & UT Martin (Note: Top seed in conference tournament.)	SIU Edwardsville	2021 Tournament	October 29–November 7	Quarterfinals: Campus sites, hosted by higher seed Semifinals and final: Hosted by regular-season champion
Pac-12	UCLA	No Tournament			
Patriot	Boston University	Bucknell	2021 Tournament	October 31–November 7	Campus sites, hosted by higher seed
SEC	Tennessee (East)	Tennessee	2021 Tournament	October 31–November 7	Orange Beach Sportsplex • Orange Beach, Alabama
SEC	Arkansas (West)	Tennessee	2021 Tournament	October 31–November 7	Orange Beach Sportsplex • Orange Beach, Alabama
SoCon	Samford		2021 Tournament	October 26–November 7	Campus sites, hosted by higher seed
Southland	Northwestern State		2021 Tournament	November 3–7	Dr. Jack Dugan Soccer & Track Stadium • Corpus Christi, Texas
The Summit	Denver	South Dakota State	2021 Tournament	November 4–6	DU Soccer Stadium • Denver, Colorado
Sun Belt	Arkansas State	South Alabama	2021 Tournament	November 2–8	Foley Sports Tourism Complex • Foley, Alabama
SWAC	Alabama A&M & Prairie View A&M	Prairie View A&M	2021 Tournament	November 4–7	PVAMU Soccer Complex • Prairie View, Texas
WCC	BYU & Santa Clara (Note: Earned automatic NCAA Tournament Bid by virtue of tiebreaker.)	No Tournament			
WAC	Stephen F. Austin (Southwest)	Grand Canyon	2021 Tournament	November 3–7	Elmer Gray Stadium • Abilene, Texas
WAC	Grand Canyon (West)	Grand Canyon	2021 Tournament	November 3–7	Elmer Gray Stadium • Abilene, Texas

== Postseason ==
=== Final rankings ===
Rank	United Soccer	TopDrawerSoccer.com
1	Florida State	Florida State
2	BYU	BYU
3	Rutgers	Rutgers
4	Santa Clara	Santa Clara
5	Duke	Arkansas
6	Arkansas	Duke
7	Michigan	Michigan
8	Virginia	South Carolina
9	TCU	Virginia
10	South Carolina	TCU
11	Tennessee	Tennessee
12	USC	Pepperdine
13	Pepperdine	Penn State
14	North Carolina	Wisconsin
15	UCLA	Notre Dame
16	Notre Dame	UCLA
17	Washington State	North Carolina
18	Ole Miss	USC
19	Xavier	Princeton
20	Memphis	Hofstra
21	SMU	Georgetown
22	Georgetown	Memphis
23	Penn State	St. John's
24	Purdue	Brown
25	Wake Forest	Purdue

== Award winners ==
=== All-America teams ===
2021 United Soccer Coaches All-America Teams
First Team	Second Team	Third Team
Ashley Orkus, GK, Ole Miss; Naomi Girma, DF, Stanford; Emily Madril, DF, Florida State; Alia Martin, DF, Michigan; Gabby Provenzano, DF, Rutgers; Croix Bethune, MF, USC; Mikayla Colohan, MF, BYU; Parker Goins, MF, Arkansas; Jaelin Howell, MF, Florida State; Frankie Tagliaferri, MF, Rutgers; Messiah Bright, FW, TCU; Michelle Cooper, FW, Duke; Diana Ordóñez, FW, Virginia; Miri Taylor, FW, Hofstra; Kelsey Turnbow, FW, Santa Clara	Kaitlyn Parks, GK, Wake Forest; Maycee Bell, DF, North Carolina; Sydney Cummings, DF, Georgetown; Alex Loera, DF, Santa Clara; Alyssa Malonson, DF, Auburn; Brandi Peterson, DF, TCU; Sam Coffey, MF, Penn State; Lia Godfrey, MF, Virginia; Sydny Nasello, MF, USF; Yujie Zhao, MF, Florida State; Elyse Bennett, FW, Washington State; Sarah Griffith, FW, Purdue; Zsani Kajan, FW, St. John's; Megan Nemec, FW, Loyola-Chicago; Brittany Raphino, FW, Brown; Jaida Thomas, FW, Tennessee	Lauren Kozal, GK, Michigan State; Elaina LaMacchia, GK, Milwaukee; Megan Bornkamp, DF, Clemson; Jordan Brewster, DF, West Virginia; Wrenne French, DF, Tennessee; Hannah Bebar, MF, Harvard; Maya Doms, MF, Stanford; Julia Grosso, MF, Texas; Lucy Porter, MF, Hofstra; Amirah Ali, FW, Rutgers; Mollie Belisle, FW, Georgia; Kirsten Davis, FW, Texas Tech; Nicole Douglas, FW, Arizona State; Mia Fishel, FW, UCLA; Penelope Hocking, FW, USC; Cameron Tucker, FW, BYU

=== Major player of the year awards ===
- Hermann Trophy: Jaelin Howell, Florida State
- TopDrawerSoccer.com National Player of the Year Award: Mikayla Colohan, BYU

=== Other major awards ===
- United Soccer Coaches College Coach of the Year: Jennifer Rockwood
- Bill Jeffrey Award: Lesle Gallimore
- Jerry Yeagley Award:
- Mike Berticelli Award: Deborah Raber
- NCAA Tournament MVP: Offensive: Yujie Zhao Defensive: Cristina Roque

== See also ==
- College soccer
- List of NCAA Division I women's soccer programs
- 2021 in American soccer
- 2021 NCAA Division I Women's Soccer Tournament
- 2021 NCAA Division I men's soccer season
