= 2021 Big South Conference women's soccer tournament =

Soccer tournament in the United States

- Classification: Division I
- Teams: 6
- Matches: 5
- Attendance: 1,715
- Site: Campus Sites (Higher Seed)
- Champions: High Point (7th title)
- Winning coach: Brandi Fontaine (1st title)
- MVP: Skyler Prillaman (High Point)
- Broadcast: ESPN+

2021 Big South Conference women's soccer standings
	Conf.						Overall
Team	W		L		T	PCT	W		L		T	PCT
Campbell ‍†‍‍	9	–	1	–	0	.900	12	–	4	–	2	.722
High Point ‍‍‡‍^{y}	8	–	2	–	0	.800	10	–	8	–	2	.550
Longwood ‍‍‍	6	–	2	–	2	.700	8	–	8	–	4	.500
Radford ‍‍‍	6	–	3	–	1	.650	13	–	5	–	1	.711
Charleston Southern ‍‍‍	5	–	5	–	0	.500	6	–	8	–	1	.433
Gardner–Webb ‍‍‍	5	–	5	–	0	.500	8	–	12	–	0	.400
UNC Asheville ‍‍‍	5	–	5	–	0	.500	6	–	11	–	1	.361
Winthrop ‍‍‍	4	–	5	–	1	.450	6	–	7	–	2	.467
USC Upstate ‍‍‍	4	–	6	–	0	.400	6	–	9	–	1	.406
Hampton ‍‍‍	0	–	9	–	1	.050	1	–	13	–	1	.100
Presbyterian ‍‍‍	0	–	9	–	1	.050	1	–	16	–	1	.083
† – Conference champion ‡ – 2021 Big South Tournament champion y – Invited to the NCAA tournament As of December 7, 2021; Rankings from United Soccer Coaches Poll; Source:Big South Conference

The 2021 Big South Conference women's soccer tournament was the postseason women's soccer tournament for the Big South Conference held from October 31 through November 7, 2021. The tournament was hosted by the higher seed in the Quarterfinals and the higher remaining seed in the Semifinals and Finals. The eight-team single-elimination tournament consisted of three rounds based on seeding from regular season conference play. Campbell were the defending champions, and the first overall seed in the tournament. However, they were unable to defend their crown, falling in extra time to High Point in the final. The conference tournament title was the seventh for the High Point women's soccer program and the first for head coach Brandi Fontaine. As tournament champions, High Point earned the Big South's automatic berth into the 2021 NCAA Division I Women's Soccer Tournament.

== Seeding ==
The top six teams in the regular season earned a spot in the tournament. Three teams tied for fifth place with 5–5 records and fifteen points at the end of the regular season. Therefore, only two teams of Charleston Southern, Gardner–Webb, and UNC Asheville could qualify for the tournament. The tiebreaker was decided based on regular season records between the schools. Charleston Southern won the tiebreaker by virtue of defeating Gardner–Webb and UNC Asheville during the regular season and was therefore the fifth seed. Gardner–Webb defeated UNC Asheville during the regular season and lost to Charleston Southern and therefore was the sixth seed. UNC Asheville lost to both Charleston Southern and Gardner–Webb during the regular season and therefore did not qualify for the tournament.

Seed	School	Conference Record	Points
1	Campbell	9–1–0	27
2	High Point	8–2–0	24
3	Longwood	6–2–2	20
4	Radford	6–3–1	19
5	Charleston Southern	5–5–0	15
6	Gardner–Webb	5–5–0	15

== Bracket ==
First round Saturday, Oct. 30
4	Radford	2
5	Charleston Southern	0
3	Longwood	2
6	Gardner–Webb	0

Semifinals; Thursday, Nov. 4
1	Campbell	5
4	Radford	1
2	High Point	3
3	Longwood	0

Final; Sunday, Nov. 7
1	Campbell	1
2	High Point (a.e.t.)	2

== Schedule ==
=== Quarterfinals ===
October 30, 2021	#3 Longwood	2–0	#6 Gardner–Webb	Farmville, VA
6:00 p.m.	Madison Lockamy 4'; Julia Gill 81'	Report		Stadium: Longwood University Athletics Complex; Attendance: 218; Referee: Aaron Hormuth; Assistant referees: Gregory Acord; Brian Odenwald; Fourth official: Ahmed Koussa

October 30, 2021	#4 Radford	2–0	#5 Charleston Southern	Radford, VA
7:00 p.m.	Reese Degnan 50'; Lily McLane 55'	Report		Stadium: Patrick D. Cupp Memorial Stadium; Attendance: 250; Referee: Clive Edwards; Assistant referees: Marcus Moss; Kenneth Berregard; Fourth official: Gene Ambrose

=== Semifinals ===
November 4, 2021	#2 High Point	3–0	#3 Longwood	High Point, NC
4:00 p.m. EST	Magdalena Schwarz 23'; Chloe Le Franc 74'; Salomé Prat 78'	Report	(yellow card) 68' Kiersten Yuhas	Stadium: Vert Stadium; Attendance: 402; Referee: Brandon Gardner; Assistant referees: Robert Velbis; Bryson Condrey; Fourth official: Kevin Maurer

November 4, 2021	#1 Campbell	5–1	#4 Radford	Buies Creek, NC
7:00 p.m.	Jessica Donald 42', 60'; Elyssa Nowowieski 65'; Jackie Richards 70'; Amber Liston 81'	Report	41' Maevyn Jones	Stadium: Eakes Athletics Complex; Attendance: 413; Referee: Rick Rogers; Assistant referees: Hicham El Bariqi; Jeremy Smith; Fourth official: Ralph Polson

=== Final ===
November 7, 2021	#1 Campbell	1–2 (a.e.t.)	#2 High Point	Buies Creek, NC
1:00 p.m. EST	Laney Peabody (yellow card) 37'; Elyssa Nowowieski (yellow card) 57'; Jackie Richards 81'	Report	30' Magdalena Schwarz; (yellow card) 72' Chloe Le Franc; 94' Skyler Prillaman	Stadium: Eakes Athletics Complex; Attendance: 432; Referee: James McKean; Assistant referees: Lucy Bell; Matthew Bell; Fourth official: Aaron Hormuth

== Statistics ==
=== Goalscorers ===
There were 16 goals scored in 5 matches, for an average of 3.2 goals per match (as of November 7, 2021).

2 goals

- Jessica Donald – Campbell
- Jackie Richards – Campbell
- Magdalena Schwarz – High Point

1 goal

- Amber Liston – Campbell
- Elyssa Nowowieski – Campbell
- Chloe Le Franc – High Point
- Salomé Prat – High Point
- Skyler Prillaman – High Point
- Julia Gill – Longwood
- Madison Lockamy – Longwood
- Reese Degnan – Radford
- Maevyn Jones – Radford
- Lily McLane – Radford

== All-Tournament team ==
Player	Team
**Skyler Prillaman**	High Point
Salomé Prat	High Point
London Lewis	High Point
Shaylyn Lewis	High Point
Jackie Richards	Campbell
Delaney Baumbick	Campbell
Elyssa Nowowieski	Campbell
Amanda Arnone	Longwood
Madison Lockamy	Longwood
Kennedy Dunnings	Radford
Kat Parris	Radford
Katelyn Kellogg	Gardner-Webb
Bri Robinson	Charleston Southern

MVP in bold

== See also ==
- Big South Conference
- 2021 NCAA Division I women's soccer season
- 2021 NCAA Division I Women's Soccer Tournament
