= 2021 Southland Conference women's soccer tournament =

Tournament held in Texas, United States

- Classification: Division I
- Teams: 7
- Matches: 6
- Attendance: 946
- Site: Dugan Stadium; Corpus Christi, Texas
- Champions: Northwestern State (5th title)
- Winning coach: Stuart Gore (1st title)
- MVP: Acelya Aydogmus (Northwestern State)
- Broadcast: ESPN+

2021 Southland Conference women's soccer standings
	Conf.						Overall
Team	W		L		T	PCT	W		L		T	PCT
Northwestern State ‍†‍‡‍^{y}	10	–	2	–	0	.833	12	–	6	–	2	.650
McNeese State ‍‍‍	9	–	2	–	1	.792	13	–	5	–	2	.700
Incarnate Word ‍‍‍	7	–	4	–	1	.625	9	–	10	–	2	.476
Texas A&M–Corpus Christi ‍‍‍	5	–	6	–	1	.458	7	–	11	–	1	.395
Southeastern Louisiana ‍‍‍	4	–	5	–	3	.458	7	–	9	–	3	.447
Houston Baptist ‍‍‍	4	–	8	–	0	.333	4	–	14	–	1	.237
Nicholls ‍‍‍	0	–	12	–	0	.000	0	–	18	–	0	.000
† – Conference champion ‡ – 2021 Southland Tournament champion y – Invited to the NCAA Tournament; As of December 7, 2021; Rankings from United Soccer Coaches Poll; Source:Southland Conference

The 2021 Southland Conference women's soccer tournament, the postseason women's soccer tournament for the Southland Conference, was held from November 3 to November 7, 2021. The six-match tournament took place at the Dr. Jack Dugan Family Soccer & Track Stadium in Corpus Christi, Texas. The seven-team single-elimination tournament consisted of three rounds based on seeding from regular season conference play. The defending champions were the Southeastern Louisiana Lions, but they were unable to defend their title falling in the Semifinals to Northwestern State 1–0. Northwestern State went on to win the tournament, defeating Incarnate Word 1–0 in the Final. The title was the fifth overall for the Northwestern State program, and first under head coach Stuart Gore. As tournament champions, Northwestern State earned the Southland Conference's automatic berth into the 2021 NCAA Division I Women's Soccer Tournament.

== Seeding ==
All seven Southland Conference teams participated in the 2021 Tournament. Seeding was based on regular season conference records. No tiebreakers were required as each team finished with a unique number of points in conference play.

Seed	School	Conference Record	Points
1	Northwestern State	10–2–0	30
2	McNeese State	9–2–1	28
3	Incarnate Word	7–4–1	22
4	Texas A&M–Corpus Christi	5–6–1	16
5	Southeastern Louisiana	4–5–3	15
6	Houston Baptist	4–8–0	12
7	Nicholls	0–12–0	0

== Bracket ==
First Round; Wednesday, November 3–4
4	Texas A&M–CC	0
5	Southeastern Louisiana	1
2	McNeese State	2
7	Nicholls	0
3	Incarnate Word	4
6	Houston Baptist	0

Semifinals; Friday, November 5
1	Northwestern State	1
5	Southeastern Louisiana	0
2	McNeese State	0
3	Incarnate Word	1

Final; Sunday, November 7
1	Northwestern State	1
3	Incarnate Word	0

== Schedule ==
=== First Round ===
November 3, 2021	#2 McNeese State	2–0	#7 Nicholls	Corpus Christi, TX
1:00 p.m. CT	Keely Morrow 32'; Jillian Bech 36'	Report		Stadium: Dugan Stadium; Attendance: 77; Referee: Arturo Ibarra; Assistant referees: Chris Gordon; Janae Thompson; Fourth official: Alex DeRostaing

November 3, 2021	#3 Incarnate Word	4–0	#6 Houston Baptist	Corpus Christi, TX
4:00 p.m. CT	Isabella Beletic 23', 44'; Sierra Wannamaker 47'; Eve Clarkson 82'	Report		Stadium: Dugan Stadium; Attendance: 133; Referee: Alex DeRostaing; Assistant referees: Jacobo Zuniga; Rebekah Jandron; Fourth official: April Castellanos

November 4, 2021	#4 Texas A&M–Corpus Christi	0–1	#5 Southeastern Louisiana	Corpus Christi, TX
9:30 a.m. CT		Report	64' Ellie Williams; (yellow card) 75' Hanna Moffatt	Stadium: Dugan Stadium; Attendance: 268; Referee: Shane Butler; Assistant referees: Janae Thompson; Jacobo Zuniga; Fourth official: April Castellanos

=== Semifinals ===
November 5, 2021	#2 McNeese State	0–1	#3 Incarnate Word	Corpus Christi, TX
4:00 p.m. CT		Report	79' Isabella Beletic	Stadium: Dugan Stadium; Attendance: 127; Referee: Shane Butler; Assistant referees: Janae Thompson; April Castellanos; Fourth official: Jacobo Zuniga

November 5, 2021	#1 Northwestern State	1–0	#5 Southeastern Louisiana	Corpus Christi, TX
7:00 p.m. CT	Olivia Draguicevich (yellow card) 45', (goal) 79'	Report		Stadium: Dugan Stadium; Attendance: 144; Referee: Fevzi Demirhan; Assistant referees: Chris Gordon; Arturo Ibarra; Fourth official: Alex DeRostaing

=== Final ===
November 7, 2021	#1 Northwestern State	1–0	#3 Incarnate Word	Corpus Christi, TX
1:00 p.m. CT	Kyle Nolen (yellow card) 30'; Faith Adams 62'	Report		Stadium: Dugan Stadium; Attendance: 197; Referee: Alex DeRostaing; Assistant referees: Chris Gordon; April Castellanos; Fourth official: Jacobo Zuniga

== Statistics ==
=== Goalscorers ===
There were 10 goals scored in 6 matches, for an average of 1.67 goals per match (as of November 7, 2021).

3 goals

- Isabella Beletic – Incarnate Word

1 goal

- Eve Clarkson – Incarnate Word
- Sierra Wannamaker – Incarnate Word
- Jillian Bech – McNeese State
- Keely Morrow – McNeese State
- Faith Adams – Northwestern State
- Olivia Draguicevich – Northwestern State
- Ellie Williams – Southeastern Louisiana

== All-Tournament team ==
Player	Team
**Acelya Aydogmus**	Northwestern State
Nicole Henry	Northwestern State
Olivia Draguicevich	Northwestern State
Delaney Wells	Northwestern State
Eve Clarkson	Incarnate Word
Sierra Wannamaker	Incarnate Word
Isabella Beletic	Incarnate Word
Keely Morrow	McNeese State
Anna Watson	McNeese State
Darby Gillette	Southeastern Louisiana
Jamie Raines	Southeastern Louisiana

MVP in bold
