= 2021 Big West Conference women's soccer tournament =

- Classification: Division I
- Teams: 4
- Matches: 3
- Attendance: 1,706
- Site: Anteater Stadium; Irvine, California
- Champions: UC Irvine (2nd title)
- Winning coach: Scott Juniper (1st title)
- MVP: Maddy Chavez (UC Irvine)
- Broadcast: ESPN+

2021 Big West Conference women's soccer standings
	Conf.						Overall
Team	W		L		T	PCT	W		L		T	PCT
UC Irvine ‍†‍‡‍^{y}	8	–	2	–	0	.800	16	–	6	–	0	.727
Cal Poly ‍‍‍	8	–	2	–	0	.800	13	–	8	–	0	.619
Cal State Fullerton ‍‍‍	7	–	3	–	0	.700	10	–	10	–	0	.500
UC Santa Barbara ‍‍‍	6	–	3	–	1	.650	8	–	9	–	3	.475
Long Beach State ‍‍‍	6	–	3	–	1	.650	9	–	7	–	2	.556
UC Davis ‍‍‍	5	–	5	–	0	.500	10	–	8	–	0	.556
UC San Diego ‍‍‍	3	–	5	–	1	.389	5	–	10	–	2	.353
Hawaii ‍‍‍	2	–	5	–	2	.333	2	–	9	–	3	.250
Cal State Bakersfield ‍‍‍	2	–	7	–	1	.250	3	–	14	–	2	.211
Cal State Northridge ‍‍‍	2	–	8	–	0	.200	3	–	17	–	0	.150
UC Riverside ‍‍‍	1	–	7	–	2	.200	4	–	11	–	2	.294
† – Conference champion ‡ – 2021 Big West Tournament champion y – Invited to the NCAA tournament As of December 7, 2021; Rankings from United Soccer Coaches Poll; Source:The Big West Conference

The 2021 Big West Conference women's soccer tournament was the postseason women's soccer tournament for the Big West Conference held on November 4 and 7, 2021. The three-match tournament took place at Anteater Stadium in Irvine, California. The four-team single-elimination tournament consisted of two rounds based on seeding from regular season conference play. The defending champions were the Cal State Fullerton Titans. The Titans won the tournament in 2019 and are classified as the defending champions because there was no tournament held in 2020 due to the COVID-19 pandemic. Cal State Fullerton was unable to defend its crown, falling to Cal Poly in the Semifinals. The UC Irvine Anteaters won the title by defeating Cal Poly 1–0 in the final. This was the second Big West tournament title for the UC Irvine program and the first for head coach Scott Juniper. As tournament champions, UC Irvine earned the Big West's automatic berth into the 2021 NCAA Division I Women's Soccer Tournament.

== Seeding ==
Four Big West schools participated in the tournament. Teams were seeded by conference record. A tiebreaker was required to determine which school would be selected as the number one seed, and tournament host. UC Irvine and Cal Poly both finished the season with twenty four points, but UC Irvine was awarded the top seed by virtue of their 2–0 win over Cal Poly on October 31. A tiebreaker was also required to determine the fourth team in the tournament after both UC Santa Barbara and Long Beach State after both teams finished the season with nineteen points. UC Santa Barbara defeated Long Beach State 2–1 on October 31, and therefore were awarded the fourth seed.

Seed	School	Conference Record	Points
1	UC Irvine	8–2–0	24
2	Cal Poly	8–2–0	24
3	Cal State Fullerton	7–3–0	21
4	UC Santa Barbara	6–3–1	19

== Bracket ==
Semifinals; Thursday, November 4
1	UC Irvine	1
4	UC Santa Barbara	0
2	Cal Poly	2
3	Cal State Fullerton	0

Final; Sunday, November 7
1	UC Irvine	1
2	Cal Poly	0

== Schedule ==
=== Semifinals ===
November 4, 2021	#2 Cal Poly	2–0	#3 Cal State Fullerton	Irvine, CA
5:00 p.m. PST	Oliva Ortiz 14'; Cal State Fullterton 51' (o.g.)	Report		Stadium: Anteater Stadium; Attendance: 289; Referee: Karen DeLeon; Assistant referees: Vincent Brizzolara; Loren Barnett; Fourth official: Magic Berenji

November 4, 2021	#1 UC Irvine	1–0	#4 UC Santa Barbara	Irvine, CA
7:30 p.m. PST	Scarlett Camberos 46' (pen.)	Report	(yellow card) 42' Team; (yellow card) 46' (yellow-red card) 90' Evann Smith; (yellow card) 65' Dylan Lewis	Stadium: Anteater Stadium; Attendance: 687; Referee: William Hoffman; Assistant referees: Magic Berenji; Steve Skille; Fourth official: Vincent Brizzolara

=== Final ===
November 7, 2021	#1 UC Irvine	1–0	#2 Cal Poly	Irvine, CA
1:00 p.m. PST	Alex Jaquez 32'	Report		Stadium: Anteater Stadium; Attendance: 730; Referee: Samantha Martinez; Assistant referees: Jaclyn Reilman; Andrea Reyes; Fourth official: Alana Ethridge

== Statistics ==
=== Goalscorers ===
There were 4 goals scored in 3 matches, for an average of 1.33 goals per match (as of November 7, 2021).

1 goal

- Olivia Ortiz – Cal Poly
- Scarlett Camberos – UC Irvine
- Alex Jaquez – UC Irvine

1 own goal

- Cal State Fullteron (against Cal Poly)
