= 2021 SWAC women's soccer tournament =

- Classification: Division I
- Teams: 8
- Matches: 7
- Attendance: 824
- Site: PVA&M Soccer Stadium; Prairie View, Texas
- Champions: Prairie View A&M (2nd title)
- Winning coach: Sonia Curvelo (2nd title)
- MVP: Savannah Powell (Prairie View A&M)
- Broadcast: SWAC Digital Network

2021 SWAC women's soccer standings
	Conf.						Overall
Team	W		L		T	PCT	W		L		T	PCT
Prairie View A&M ‍†‍‡‍^{y}	8	–	1	–	0	.889	11	–	4	–	2	.706
Alabama A&M ‍†‍‍	8	–	1	–	0	.889	10	–	8	–	1	.553
Grambling State ‍‍‍	6	–	2	–	1	.722	9	–	7	–	2	.556
Alabama State ‍‍‍	5	–	3	–	1	.611	7	–	9	–	3	.447
Texas Southern ‍‍‍	4	–	2	–	3	.611	5	–	7	–	3	.433
Jackson State ‍‍‍	3	–	3	–	3	.500	4	–	11	–	3	.306
Southern ‍‍‍	3	–	5	–	1	.389	5	–	9	–	2	.375
Arkansas–Pine Bluff ‍‍‍	2	–	7	–	0	.222	6	–	13	–	0	.316
Alcorn State ‍‍‍	1	–	7	–	1	.167	3	–	14	–	2	.211
Mississippi Valley State ‍‍‍	0	–	9	–	0	.000	1	–	12	–	0	.077
† – Conference champion ‡ – 2021 SWAC Tournament champion y – Invited to the NCAA tournament As of December 7, 2021; Rankings from United Soccer Coaches Poll; Source: SWAC

The 2021 SWAC women's soccer tournament was the postseason women's soccer tournament for the Southwestern Athletic Conference held November 4–7, 2021. The seven-match tournament took place at the Prairie View A&M Soccer Stadium in Prairie View, Texas. The eight-team single-elimination tournament consisted of three rounds based on seeding from regular season conference play. The defending champions were the Alabama State Hornets, however they were unable to defend their title, losing 3–0 to the Prairie View A&M Panthers in the Semifinals. Prairie View A&M went on to win the tournament, defeating Grambling State in a penalty shoot-out in the Final. The conference tournament title was the second in the history of the Paririe View A&M women's soccer program, both of which have come under head coach Sonia Curvelo. As tournament champions, Prairie View A&M earned the SWAC's automatic berth into the 2021 NCAA Division I Women's Soccer Tournament.

== Seeding ==
Eight of the ten teams that compete in women's soccer qualified for the 2021 Tournament. Seeding was based on regular season conference play. A tiebreaker was required to determine the number one and number two seeds in the tournament as Prairie View A&M and Alabama A&M both finished with identical 8–1–0 conference records. Prairie View A&M earned the first seed by virtue of their victory over Alabama A&M on October 1.

Seed	School	Conference Record	Points
1	Prairie View A&M	8–1–0	24
2	Alabama A&M	8–1–0	24
3	Grambling State	6–2–1	19
4	Alabama State	5–3–1	16
5	Texas Southern	4–2–3	15
6	Jackson State	3–3–3	12
7	Southern	3–5–1	10
8	Arkansas–Pine Bluff	2–7–0	6

== Bracket ==
Quarterfinals; Thursday, Nov. 4
1	Prairie View A&M	4
8	Arkansas–Pine Bluff	0
4	Alabama State	3
5	Texas Southern	0
3	Grambling State	2
6	Jackson State	1
2	Alabama A&M (a.e.t.)	1
7	Southern	0

Semifinals; Friday, Nov. 5
1	Prairie View A&M	3
4	Alabama State	0
3	Grambling State	2
2	Alabama A&M	0

Final; Sunday, Nov. 7
1	Prairie View A&M (pen.)	1 (3)
3	Grambling State	1 (2)

== Schedule ==
=== Quarterfinals ===
November 4, 2021	#1 Prairie View A&M	4–0	#8 Arkansas–Pine Bluff	Prairie View, Texas
11:00 a.m. CT	JoJo Bernal 15'; Savannah Powell 62', 65'; Andrea Nugent 66' (pen.)	Report	(yellow card) 31' Erin Fite; (yellow card) 55' Natalie Freeman; (yellow card) 66' Brisha Musungu	Stadium: PVA&M Soccer Stadium; Attendance: 176; Referee: Jordan Gray; Assistant referees: Estefania Estrada; Jalen Gray; Fourth official: Deepak Lumba

November 4, 2021	#4 Alabama State	3–0	#5 Texas Southern	Prairie View, Texas
2:00 p.m. CT	Grace Norbury 6', (yellow card) 45'; McKenna Wiscombe 49' (pen.), 62'; Kayleigh ONeal (yellow card) 57'; Kassandra Schoen (yellow card) 77'	Report	(yellow card) 63' Hayden McMillan	Stadium: PVA&M Soccer Stadium; Attendance: 78; Referee: Wes Caouette; Assistant referees: Ricardo Hernandez; Sean Caoutte; Fourth official: Albert Kyei-Mensah

November 4, 2021	#3 Grambling State	2–1	#6 Jackson State	Prairie View, Texas
5:00 p.m. CT	Kaydeen Jack (yellow card) 29'; Lindsay Jaiyesimi 77'; Miranda Urbizu 84'	Report	4', (yellow card) 11' Annalise Brunson; (yellow card) 8' Maya-Joy Thompson; (yellow card) 17' Olivia Cobb	Stadium: PVA&M Soccer Stadium; Attendance: 78; Referee: Jalen Gray; Assistant referees: Albert Kyei-Mensah; Jordan Gray

November 4, 2021	#2 Alabama A&M	1–0 (a.e.t.)	#7 Southern	Prairie View, Texas
8:00 p.m. CT	Team (yellow card) 93'; Makayla Rushing (yellow card) 102'; Fernanda Valencia 104'	Report	(yellow card) 83' Amina Booker	Stadium: PVA&M Soccer Stadium; Attendance: 67; Referee: Laith Dahhan; Assistant referees: Ruben Campillo; Albert Kyei-Mensah; Fourth official: Jalen Gray

=== Semifinals ===
November 5, 2021	#1 Prairie View A&M	3–0	#4 Alabama State	Prairie View, Texas
3:00 p.m. CT	Savannah Powell 1'; Lesa Griffin 23'; Jaiden Morgan 30'	Report		Stadium: PVA&M Soccer Stadium; Attendance: 176; Referee: Jalen Gray; Assistant referees: Jordan Gray; Sean Caouette; Fourth official: Laith Dahhan

November 5, 2021	#2 Alabama A&M	0–2	#3 Grambling State	Prairie View, Texas
5:30 p.m. CT		Report	4' Lizbeth Aguero; (yellow card) 67' Lindsay Jaiyesimi; 89' Kailey Pena	Stadium: PVA&M Soccer Stadium; Attendance: 82; Referee: Wes Caouette; Assistant referees: Albert Kyei-Mensah; Laith Dahhan; Fourth official: Sean Cauoette

=== Final ===
November 7, 2021	#1 Prairie View A&M	1–1 (a.e.t.) (3–2 p)	#3 Grambling State	Prairie View, Texas
11:00 a.m. CT	Sonia Fuentes (yellow card) 17'; D'Sanye Nugent 68' (pen.); Andrea Nugent (yellow card) 74'; Savannah Powell (yellow card) 109'	Report	(yellow card) 17', (goal) 21' Lizbeth Aguero; (yellow card) 37' Kaydeen Jack; (yellow card) 55' Team; (yellow card) 108' Mackenzie Rastatter	Stadium: PVA&M Soccer Stadium; Attendance: 167; Referee: Albert Kyei-Mensah; Assistant referees: Laith Dahhan; Wes Caouette; Fourth official: Ruben Campillo
	Penalties
	D'Sanye Nugent (penalty scored); Samantha Moran (penalty missed); Megan Howell (penalty missed); Xandria Johnson (penalty scored); Kalia Brown (penalty scored)		(penalty missed) Paula Burillo-Blasco; (penalty scored) Kambria Cash; (penalty scored) Kaydeen Jack; (penalty missed) CaLeigha Callahan; (penalty missed) Mackenzie Rastatter

== Statistics ==
=== Goalscorers ===
There were 18 goals scored in 7 matches, for an average of 2.57 goals per match (as of November 7, 2021).

3 goals

- Savannah Powell – Prairie View A&M

2 goals

- McKenna Wiscombe – Alabama State
- Lizbeth Aguero – Grambling State

1 goal

- Fernanda Valencia – Alabama A&M
- Grace Norbury – Alabama State
- Lindsay Jaiyseimi – Grambling State
- Kailey Pena – Grambling State
- Miranda Urbizu – Grambling State
- Annalise Brunson – Jackson State
- JoJo Bernal – Prairie View A&M
- Lesa Griffin – Prairie View A&M
- Jaiden Morgan – Prairie View A&M
- Andrea Nugent – Prairie View A&M
- D'Sanye Nugent – Prairie View A&M

== All-Tournament team ==
Player	Team
**Savannah Powell**	Prairie View A&M
Quinn Josiah	Prairie View A&M
Andrea Nugent	Prairie View A&M
D'Sanye Nugent	Prairie View A&M
JoJo Bernal	Prairie View A&M
Lizbeth Aguero	Grambling State
Kaydeen Jack	Grambling State
Kailey Pena	Grambling State
Tateyana Pitter	Alabama A&M
Makayla Rushing	Alabama A&M
McKenna Wiscombe	Alabama State

MVP in bold
