= 2021 American Athletic Conference women's soccer tournament =

- Classification: Division I
- Teams: 6
- Matches: 5
- Attendance: 2,202
- Site: Corbett Stadium; Tampa, Florida
- Champions: Memphis (2nd title)
- Winning coach: Brooks Monaghan (2nd title)
- MVP: Saorla Miller (Offensive); Elizabeth Moberg (Defensive) (Memphis)
- Broadcast: ESPN+ (Semifinals); ESPNNews (Final)

2021 American Athletic Conference women's soccer standings
	Conf.						Overall
Team	W		L		T	PCT	W		L		T	PCT
South Florida ‍†‍‍^{y}	6	–	1	–	1	.813	12	–	4	–	3	.711
Houston ‍‍‍	5	–	2	–	1	.688	13	–	5	–	2	.700
No. 20 Memphis ‍‍‡‍^{y}	5	–	3	–	0	.625	14	–	5	–	2	.714
No. 21 SMU ‍‍‍^{y}	4	–	2	–	2	.625	12	–	5	–	2	.684
East Carolina ‍‍‍	3	–	3	–	2	.500	8	–	9	–	2	.474
UCF ‍‍‍	3	–	4	–	1	.438	8	–	7	–	1	.531
Cincinnati ‍‍‍	2	–	4	–	2	.375	7	–	7	–	3	.500
Temple ‍‍‍	2	–	6	–	0	.250	5	–	8	–	3	.406
Tulsa ‍‍‍	1	–	6	–	1	.188	6	–	9	–	2	.412
† – Conference champion ‡ – 2021 AAC Tournament champion y – Invited to the NCAA tournament As of December 7, 2021; Rankings from United Soccer Coaches Poll; Source:American Athletic Conference

The 2021 American Athletic Conference women's soccer tournament was the postseason women's soccer tournament for the American Athletic Conference held from October 31 to November 7, 2021. The first round was hosted by the higher seed, and the Semifinals and Final took place at the home field of the regular season champion. South Florida. The six-team single-elimination tournament consisted of three rounds based on seeding from regular season conference play. The South Florida Bulls are the defending tournament champions. South Florida was unable to defend its title, losing on penalties to Memphis in the final. Memphis' win was the program's second and also the second for coach Brooks Monaghan. As tournament champions, Memphis earned the American's automatic berth into the 2021 NCAA Division I Women's Soccer Tournament.

== Seeding ==
The top six teams in the regular season earned a spot in the tournament.

Seed	School	Conference Record	Points
1	South Florida	6–1–1	19
2	Houston	5–2–1	16
3	Memphis	5–3–0	15
4	SMU	4–2–2	14
5	East Carolina	3–3–2	11
6	UCF	3–4–1	10

== Bracket ==
Quarterfinals; Sunday, Oct. 31
4	SMU	2
5	East Carolina	1
3	Memphis	2
6	UCF	0

Semifinals; Thursday, Nov. 4
1	South Florida	2
4	SMU	0
2	Houston	0
3	Memphis	1

Final; Sunday, Nov. 7
1	South Florida	0 (0)
3	Memphis (pen.)	0 (3)

== Schedule ==
=== Quarterfinals ===
October 31, 2021	#3 Memphis	2–0	#6 UCF	Memphis, Tennessee
Noon	Jocelyn Alonzo 57'; Aubrey Mister 68'	Report		Stadium: Mike Rose Soccer Complex; Attendance: 221; Referee: Jamie Padilla; Assistant referees: Wes Caouette; Mark Herrington; Fourth official: Albert Keyi-Mensah

October 31, 2021	#4 SMU	2–1	#5 East Carolina	Dallas, Texas
Noon	Wayny Balata 11', 63'; Abby Dermott (yellow card) 81'	Report	13' Morgan Dewey; (yellow card) 75' Maycie McDougal	Stadium: Washburne Soccer and Track Stadium; Attendance: 330; Referee: Lorenzo Hernandez; Assistant referees: Jacob Larson; Tony Obas; Fourth official: John Navarro

=== Semifinals ===
November 4, 2021	#2 Houston	0–1	#3 Memphis	Tampa, Florida
4:00 p.m.	Adriana Huston (yellow card) 77'	Report	85', (yellow card) 88' Saorla Miller	Stadium: Corbett Stadium; Attendance: 94; Referee: Katherine McCormick; Assistant referees: Albert Escovar; Joseph Radzialowski; Fourth official: Adam Brzozowiec

November 4, 2021	#1 South Florida	2–0	#4 SMU	Tampa, Florida
7:00 p.m.	Sydny Nasello 56'; Lucy Roberts 74'	Report		Stadium: Corbett Stadium; Attendance: 726; Referee: Alyssa Nichols; Assistant referees: Miguel Martes; Rhett Hammil; Fourth official: Wesley Costa

=== Final ===
November 7, 2021	#1 South Florida	0–0 (a.e.t.) (0–3 p)	#3 Memphis	Tampa, Florida
Noon	Lucy Roberts (yellow card) 73'	Report	(yellow card) 29' Mackenzie Bray; (yellow card) 95' Haylee Spray	Stadium: Corbett Stadium; Attendance: 831; Referee: Jonathan Weiner; Assistant referees: Erika Barahona; Sarieni Vasquez; Fourth official: Albert Escovar
	Penalties
	Sydny Nasello (penalty missed); Muino Gonzalez (penalty missed); Katie Kitching (penalty missed)		(penalty scored) Tanya Boychuk; (penalty scored) Saorla Miller; (penalty scored) Jocelyn Alonzo

== Statistics ==
=== Goalscorers ===
There were 8 goals scored in 5 matches, for an average of 1.6 goals per match (as of November 7, 2021).

2 goals

- Wayny Balata – SMU

1 goal

- Jocelyn Alonzo – Memphis
- Morgan Dewey – East Carolina
- Saorla Miller – Memphis
- Aubrey Mister – Memphis
- Sydny Nasello – South Florida
- Lucy Roberts – South Florida

== All-Tournament team ==
Player	Team
Caroline Duncan	Memphis
Saorla Miller*	Memphis
Elizabeth Moberg^	Memphis
Kimberley Smit	Memphis
Haylee Spray	Memphis
Vivianne Bessette	South Florida
Sydney Martinez	South Florida
Rosalia Muino Gonzalez	South Florida
Sydny Nasello	South Florida
Emma Clarke	Houston
Wayny Balata	SMU

* Offensive MVP
^ Defensive MVP
