= 2021 Patriot League women's soccer tournament =

Postseason women's soccer tournament for the Patriot League

- Classification: Division I
- Teams: 6
- Matches: 5
- Attendance: 2,358
- Site: Campus Sites, Higher seed
- Champions: Bucknell (5th title)
- Winning coach: Kelly Cook (3rd title)
- MVP: Teresa Deda (Bucknell)
- Broadcast: ESPN+

2021 Patriot League women's soccer standings
	Conf.						Overall
Team	W		L		T	PCT	W		L		T	PCT
Boston University ‍†‍‍	6	–	1	–	2	.778	11	–	6	–	3	.625
Navy ‍‍‍	6	–	2	–	1	.722	11	–	6	–	3	.625
Loyola (MD) ‍‍‍	5	–	1	–	3	.722	8	–	6	–	4	.556
Bucknell ‍‍‡‍^{y}	5	–	2	–	2	.667	11	–	8	–	3	.568
Lehigh ‍‍‍	4	–	4	–	1	.500	6	–	10	–	1	.382
Colgate ‍‍‍	3	–	4	–	2	.444	7	–	8	–	2	.471
Army ‍‍‍	3	–	4	–	2	.444	7	–	9	–	3	.447
Lafayette ‍‍‍	3	–	6	–	0	.333	5	–	10	–	0	.333
American ‍‍‍	2	–	5	–	2	.333	5	–	9	–	2	.375
Holy Cross ‍‍‍	0	–	8	–	1	.056	1	–	15	–	1	.088
† – Conference champion ‡ – 2021 Patriot League tournament champion y – Invited to the NCAA tournament As of December 7, 2021; Rankings from United Soccer Coaches Poll; Source:Patriot League

The 2021 Patriot League women's soccer tournament was the postseason women's soccer tournament for the Patriot League held from October 31 through November 7, 2021. The tournament was held at campus sites, with the higher seeded team hosting. The six-team single-elimination tournament consisted of three rounds based on seeding from regular season conference play. The defending champions were the Navy Midshipmen, however they were unable to defend their crown, after losing to Bucknell in the Semifinals. Bucknell went on to win the tournament, defeating Boston University, who were the #1 seed, 1–0 in the final. The conference championship was the fifth for the Bucknell women's soccer program, three of which have come under head coach Kelly Cook. As tournament champions, Bucknell earned the Patriot League's automatic berth into the 2021 NCAA Division I Women's Soccer Tournament.

== Seeding ==
Seeding was based on regular season play with the top six teams qualifying for the tournament. The top two seeds received a bye to the Semifinals of the tournament and the higher seed hosted each match. A tiebreaker was required to determine the sixth and final seed in the tournament as Army and Colgate finished with identical 3–4–2 records during the regular season. Army was awarded the sixth seed by virtue of their 2–1 win over Colgate on October 9.

Seed	School	Conference Record	Points
1	Boston University	6–1–2	20
2	Navy	6–2–1	19
3	Loyola (MD)	5–1–3	18
4	Bucknell	5–2–2	17
5	Lehigh	4–4–1	13
6	Army	3–4–2	11

== Bracket ==
Quarterfinals; Sunday, Oct. 31
4	Bucknell	2
5	Lehigh	0
3	Loyola (MD)	1
6	Army (a.e.t.)	2

Semifinals; Thursday, Nov. 4
1	Boston University	1
6	Army	0
2	Navy	0
4	Bucknell (a.e.t.)	1

Final; Sunday, Nov. 7
1	Boston University	0
4	Bucknell	1

== Schedule ==
=== Quarterfinals ===
October 31, 2021	#4 Bucknell	2–0	#5 Lehigh	Lewisburg, PA
1:10 p.m. ET	Hannah Stuck 47', (yellow card) 64'; Paige Temple (yellow card) 54'; Claire Mensi 79'	Report		Stadium: Emmitt Field; Attendance: 535; Referee: Anelise Cimino; Assistant referees: Brendan Orino; Mindy Malia; Fourth official: Michael Gorsenger

October 31, 2021	#3 Loyola (MD)	1–2 (a.e.t.)	#6 Army	Baltimore, MD
2:05 p.m ET	Sarah Mirr 87'	Report	54' Trinity Garay; 92' Jasmine Talley	Stadium: Ridley Athletic Complex; Attendance: 304; Referee: Mathew Richardson; Assistant referees: Sharon Gingrich; Max Smith; Fourth official: Alla Stepanov

=== Semifinals ===
November 4, 2021	#2 Navy	0–1 (a.e.t.)	#4 Bucknell	Annapolis, MD
6:00 p.m. ET		Report	94' Teresa Deda	Stadium: Glenn Warner Soccer Facility; Attendance: 704; Referee: Danielle Chesky; Assistant referees: Rob Cordrey; Marie Dunn; Fourth official: James Sadowski

November 4, 2021	#1 Boston University	1–0	#6 Army	Boston, MA
7:05 p.m. ET	Marli Rajacich 51'	Report		Stadium: Nickerson Field; Attendance: 311; Referee: Jose Mendes; Assistant referees: Jessica Carnevale; Syrus Ataii; Fourth official: Shaye Lane

=== Final ===
November 7, 2021	#1 Boston University	0–1	#4 Bucknell	Boston, MA
1:05 p.m. ET	Ashley Raphael (yellow card) 39'	Report	(yellow card) 33' Teresa Deda; (yellow card) 58' Paige Temple; 75' (o.g.) Boston U Own Goal; (yellow card) 85' Hannah Stuck	Stadium: Nickerson Field; Attendance: 504; Referee: Jason Pelletier; Assistant referees: Shannon Malloy; Jill Canelli; Fourth official: Yves Jeanty

== Statistics ==
=== Goalscorers ===
There were 8 goals scored in 5 matches, for an average of 1.6 goals per match (as of November 7, 2021).

1 goal

- Trinity Garay – Army
- Jasmine Talley – Army
- Marli Rajacich – Boston University
- Teresa Deda – Bucknell
- Claire Mensi – Bucknell
- Hannah Stuck – Bucknell
- Sarah Mirr – Loyola (MD)

1 own goal

- Boston University (against Bucknell)

== All-Tournament team ==
Player	Team
**Teresa Deda**	Bucknell
Jenna Hall	Bucknell
Claire Mensi	Bucknell
Petie Nassetta	Bucknell
Gretchen Bennett	Boston University
Marli Rajacich	Boston University
Julianna Stureman	Boston University
Trinity Garay	Army
Emma Richey	Army
Tatum Kelly	Navy
Sadie McCaleb	Navy

MVP in bold
