= 2021 Missouri Valley Conference women's soccer tournament =

- Classification: Division I
- Teams: 6
- Matches: 5
- Attendance: 1,535
- Site: Loyola Soccer Park (Semifinals & Final); Chicago, Illinois
- Champions: Loyola (4th title)
- Winning coach: Barry Bimbi (4th title)
- MVP: Amanda Cassidy (Loyola)
- Broadcast: ESPN+

2021 Missouri Valley Conference women's soccer standings
| | Conf. | | | | | | Overall |
| Team | W | | L | | T | PCT | W | | L | | T | PCT |
|---|---|---|---|---|---|---|---|---|---|---|---|---|
| Loyola–Chicago ‍†‍‡‍^{y} | 7 | – | 0 | – | 1 | .938 | 13 | – | 3 | – | 2 | .778 |
| Valparaiso ‍‍‍ | 6 | – | 1 | – | 1 | .813 | 10 | – | 6 | – | 2 | .611 |
| Indiana State ‍‍‍ | 4 | – | 2 | – | 2 | .625 | 6 | – | 7 | – | 4 | .471 |
| Northern Iowa ‍‍‍ | 3 | – | 4 | – | 1 | .438 | 6 | – | 10 | – | 2 | .389 |
| Drake ‍‍‍ | 2 | – | 3 | – | 3 | .438 | 8 | – | 7 | – | 5 | .525 |
| Evansville ‍‍‍ | 2 | – | 3 | – | 3 | .438 | 7 | – | 5 | – | 7 | .553 |
| Illinois State ‍‍‍ | 2 | – | 3 | – | 3 | .438 | 4 | – | 10 | – | 3 | .324 |
| Missouri State ‍‍‍ | 2 | – | 4 | – | 2 | .375 | 5 | – | 7 | – | 5 | .441 |
| Southern Illinois ‍‍‍ | 0 | – | 8 | – | 0 | .000 | 0 | – | 15 | – | 1 | .031 |
† – Conference champion ‡ – 2021 Missouri Valley Tournament champion y – Invited to the NCAA tournament As of December 7, 2021; Rankings from United Soccer Coaches Poll; Source:Missouri Valley Conference

The 2021 Missouri Valley Conference women's soccer tournament was the postseason women's soccer tournament for the Missouri Valley Conference held from October 31 through November 7, 2021. The First Round was held at campus sites. The semifinals and finals took place at Loyola Soccer Park in Chicago, Illinois. The six-team single-elimination tournament consisted of three rounds based on seeding from regular season conference play. The defending champions were the Loyola Ramblers, who successfully defended their title by defeating Evansville 4–0 in the final. The conference tournament title was the fourth for the Loyloa women's soccer program, all of which have come under head coach Barry Bimbi. The championship was also the fourth in a row for the Loyola program. As tournament champions, Loyola earned the Missouri Valley's automatic berth into the 2021 NCAA Division I Women's Soccer Tournament.

== Seeding ==
Six of the nine Missouri Valley Conference women's soccer programs qualified for the 2021 Tournament. Teams were seeded based on their regular season records. A three-way tiebreaker was required to determine the fifth and sixth teams that qualified for the tournament, with the final team in the tiebreaker not qualifying for the tournament. Drake, Evansville, and Illinois State all finished with identical 2–3–3 records in the regular season. The final seedings and qualification were determined by points per match against the top four seeds during the regular season. Drake earned the fifth seed with 1 point per match. Evansville earned the sixth and final spot with .75 points per match. Illinois State did not qualify for the tournament after earning .5 points per match against the top four seeds.

| Seed | School | Conference Record | Points |
|---|---|---|---|
| 1 | Loyola–Chicago | 7–0–1 | 22 |
| 2 | Valparaiso | 6–1–1 | 19 |
| 3 | Indiana State | 4–2–2 | 14 |
| 4 | Northern Iowa | 3–4–1 | 10 |
| 5 | Drake | 2–3–3 | 9 |
| 6 | Evansville | 2–3–3 | 9 |

== Bracket ==
Opening Round; Sunday, Oct. 31
4 | Northern Iowa | 2
5 | Drake (a.e.t.) | 3
3 | Indiana State | 1 (5)
6 | Evansville (pen.) | 1 (6)

Semifinals; Friday, Nov. 5
1 | Loyola–Chicago | 4
5 | Drake | 1
2 | Valparaiso | 1
6 | Evansville (a.e.t.) | 2

Final; Sunday, Nov. 7
1 | Loyola–Chicago | 4
6 | Evansville | 0

== Schedule ==
=== Opening Round ===
| October 31, 2021 | #4 Northern Iowa | 2–3 (a.e.t.) | #5 Drake | Cedar Falls, IA |
| 10:30 a.m. CT | Sophia Meier 33'; Allison Whitaker 83' | Report | 13', 100' Libby Helverson; 77' Makenna Shepard | Stadium: Cedar Valley Soccer Complex; Attendance: 300 |

| October 31, 2021 | #3 Indiana State | 1–1 (a.e.t.) (3–5 p) | #6 Evansville | Terre Haute, IN |
| 12:00 p.m. CT | Anna Holcombe 15' | Report | 47' Rachel Rosborough; (yellow card) 82' Emily Olson | Stadium: Memorial Stadium; Attendance: 130 |
| | Penalties |
| | Maddie Alexander (penalty scored); Isabella Hunter (penalty scored); Audrey Stephens (penalty missed); Mackenzie Kent (penalty scored) | | (penalty scored) Abby Phelps; (penalty scored) Emily Ormson; (penalty scored) Emilie Hill; (penalty scored) Morgan Blair; (penalty scored) Jayme-Lee Hunter |

=== Semifinals ===
| November 5, 2021 | #2 Valparaiso | 1–2 (a.e.t.) | #6 Evansville | Chicago, IL |
| 3:00 p.m. CT | Addy Joiner 14'; Peyton Flynn (yellow card) 54'; Nicole Norfolk (yellow card) 87' | Report | 7' Alex Eyler; (yellow card) 66', 104' Emily Ormson | Stadium: Loyola Soccer Park; Attendance: 346; Referee: Art Arustamyan; Assistant referees: Quinton McFarlen; Zachary Richter; Fourth official: Vitali Hantsevich |

| November 5, 2021 | #1 Loyola–Chicago | 4–1 | #5 Drake | Chicago, IL |
| 6:00 p.m. CT | Amanda Cassidy 4'; Megan Nemec 19'; Madeleine Barone 42'; Taylor Harrison 57' | Report | 78' Libby Helverson | Stadium: Loyola Soccer Park; Attendance: 347; Referee: Dimitrios Katsimingos; Assistant referees: James Wozny; Evangelos Vouris; Fourth official: Vitali Hantsevich |

=== Final ===
| November 7, 2021 | #1 Loyola–Chicago | 4–0 | #6 Evansville | Chicago, IL |
| 1:00 p.m. CT | Jenna Ross 29', (yellow card) 52'; Amanda Cassidy 32'; Own Goal 53' (o.g.); Megan Demski 77' | Report | (yellow card) 52' (yellow-red card) 63' Emily Olson | Stadium: Loyola Soccer Park; Attendance: 412; Referee: Heber Estrada; Assistant referees: Arling Kociu; Eulogio Villapando; Fourth official: James Wozny |

== Statistics ==
=== Goalscorers ===
There were 19 goals scored in 5 matches, for an average of 3.8 goals per match (as of November 7, 2021).

3 goals

- Libby Helverson – Drake

2 goals

- Amanda Cassidy – Loyola–Chicago

1 goal

- Alex Eyler – Evansville
- Emily Ormson – Evansville
- Rachel Rosborough – Evansville
- Makenna Shepard – Drake
- Anna Holcombe – Indiana State
- Madeline Barone – Loyola–Chicago
- Megan Demski – Loyola–Chicago
- Taylor Harrison – Loyola–Chicago
- Megan Nemec – Loyola–Chicago
- Jenna Ross – Loyola–Chicago
- Sophia Meier – Northern Iowa
- Allison Whitaker – Northern Iowa
- Addy Joiner – Valparaiso

1 own goal

- Evansville (vs. Loyola–Chicago)

== All-Tournament team ==
| Player | Team |
|---|---|
| **Amanda Cassidy** | Loyola-Chicago |
| Megan Nemec | Loyola-Chicago |
| Abby Swanson | Loyola-Chicago |
| Jenna Ross | Loyola-Chicago |
| Michaela Till | Evansville |
| Emily Ormson | Evansville |
| Rachel Rosborough | Evansville |
| Kelsie Stone | Drake |
| Libby Helverson | Drake |
| Morgan Metzger | Valparaiso |
| Kiley Dugan | Valparaiso |
| Kloe Pettigrew | Indiana State |
| Siri Ott | Northern Iowa |

MVP in bold
