= 2021 Ohio Valley Conference women's soccer tournament =

- Classification: Division I
- Teams: 8
- Matches: 7
- Attendance: 1,731
- Site: Skyhawk Soccer Field; Martin, Tennessee (Semifinals & Final)
- Champions: SIU Edwardsville (4th title)
- Winning coach: Derek Burton (4th title)
- MVP: Lydia Harris (SIU Edwardsville)
- Broadcast: ESPN+

2021 Ohio Valley Conference women's soccer standings
	Conf.						Overall
Team	W		L		T	PCT	W		L		T	PCT
UT Martin ‍†‍‍	6	–	2	–	0	.750	11	–	6	–	1	.639
SIU Edwardsville ‍†‍‡‍^{y}	6	–	2	–	0	.750	11	–	7	–	0	.611
Belmont ‍‍‍	5	–	3	–	0	.625	8	–	8	–	1	.500
Murray State ‍‍‍	4	–	3	–	1	.563	9	–	8	–	1	.528
Tennessee Tech ‍‍‍	3	–	2	–	3	.563	6	–	6	–	4	.500
Southeast Missouri State ‍‍‍	2	–	4	–	2	.375	7	–	10	–	2	.421
Morehead State ‍‍‍	2	–	4	–	2	.375	4	–	10	–	4	.333
Eastern Illinois ‍‍‍	2	–	5	–	1	.313	4	–	11	–	2	.294
Austin Peay ‍‍‍	1	–	6	–	1	.188	4	–	10	–	3	.324
† – Conference champion ‡ – 2021 OVC Tournament champion y – Invited to the NCAA tournament As of December 7, 2021; Rankings from United Soccer Coaches Poll; Source:Ohio Valley Conference

The 2021 Ohio Valley Conference women's soccer tournament was the postseason women's soccer tournament for the Ohio Valley Conference held from October 29 through November 7, 2021. The first round and quarterfinals of the tournament were held at campus sites hosted by the #3 and #4 seeds, while the semifinals and final took place at Skyhawk Soccer Field in Martin, Tennessee. The eight-team single-elimination tournament consisted of four rounds based on seeding from regular season conference play. The SIU Edwardsville Cougars were the defending champions and successfully defended their crown by defeating top seeded UT Martin in the final. The conference tournament title was the fourth for the SIU Edwardsville women's soccer program, all of which have come under head coach Derek Burton. As tournament champions, SIU Edwardsville earned the Ohio Valley's automatic berth into the 2021 NCAA Division I Women's Soccer Tournament.

== Seeding ==
Eight of the nine teams in the Ohio Valley Conference qualified for the 2021 Tournament. The #1 seed was awarded as the host institution for the Semifinals and Finals of the tournament. The #1 and #2 seed received byes to the Semifinals, while the #4 and #5 seeds received byes to the Quarterfinals. Seems were seeded based on regular season records, and a tiebreaker was required to determine the #1 and #2 seeds when UT Martin and SIU Edwardsville both finished with 6–2–0 regular season records. UT Martin was awarded the #1 seed based on their 1–0 victory over SIU Edwardsville on October 10, during the regular season. A second tiebreaker was required to determine the #6 and #7 seeds as Southeast Missouri State and Morehead State finished the regular season with 2–4–2 records. The teams played to a 0–0 draw on October 17, during the regular season. Morehead State was awarded the #6 seed by virtue of having a better record against the team's highest seeded common opponent, Tennessee Tech. Morehead State defeated Tennessee Tech 1–0 while Southeast Missouri State drew 0–0.

Seed	School	Conference Record	Points
1	UT Martin	6–2–0	18
2	SIU Edwardsville	6–2–0	18
3	Belmont	5–3–0	15
4	Murray State	4–3–1	13
5	Tennessee Tech	3–2–3	12
6	Southeast Missouri State	2–4–2	8
7	Morehead State	2–4–2	8
8	Eastern Illinois	2–5–1	7

== Bracket ==
First round Friday, Oct. 29
5	Tennessee Tech	1
8	Eastern Illinois	0
6	Morehead State	0
7	SE Missouri State	1

Quarterfinals; Sunday, Oct. 31
4	Murray State	1
5	Tennessee Tech	2
3	Belmont	1
7	SE Missouri State (a.e.t.)	2

Semifinals; Friday, Nov. 5
1	UT Martin	1
5	Tennessee Tech	0
2	SIU Edwardsville	3
7	SE Missouri State	0

Final; Sunday, Nov. 7
1	UT Martin	0
2	SIU Edwardsville (a.e.t.)	1

== Schedule ==
=== First Round ===
October 29, 2021	#5 Tennessee Tech	1–0	#8 Eastern Illinois	Murray, KY
2:00 p.m.	Gabby Garcia 55'	Report	(yellow card) 71' Kenzie Balcerak	Stadium: Cutchin Field; Attendance: 67; Referee: Jessica Medley; Assistant referees: Gustavo Turmero; Skyye Medley; Fourth official: Keith Green

October 29, 2021	#6 Morehead State	0–1	#7 Southeast Missouri State	Nashville, TN
6:00 p.m.		Report	Lauren Welker 63'	Stadium: E. S. Rose Park; Attendance: 47; Referee: Donovan Eubank; Assistant referees: John Rafter; Tarik Veledar

=== Quarterfinals ===
October 31, 2021	#4 Murray State	1–2	#5 Tennessee Tech	Murray, KY
1:00 p.m.	Chloe Barnthouse (yellow card) 37'; Audrey Henry 86'; Saraya Young (yellow card) 88'; Lauren Payne (yellow card) 89'	Report	23' Chloe Smith; (yellow card) 44' Taylor Rhodes; 89' (pen.) Meredith Nye	Stadium: Cutchin Field; Attendance: 204

October 31, 2021	#3 Belmont	1–2 (a.e.t.)	#7 Southeast Missouri State	Nashville, TN
2:00 p.m.	Sydney Cason 58'	Report	(yellow card) 33' Kiana Khedoo; 47' Lauren Welker; (yellow card) 55' Natalie Jackson; 92' Morgan McCourt	Stadium: E. S. Rose Park; Attendance: 110; Referee: Skyye Medley; Assistant referees: Adam Warner; John Devalk; Fourth official: Glen Garrett

=== Semifinals ===
November 5, 2021	#1 UT Martin	1–0	#5 Tennessee Tech	Martin, Tennessee
4:00 p.m.	Emely van der Vliet 84'; Jill Hildreth (yellow card) 90'	Report	(yellow card) 89' Meredith Nye	Stadium: Skyhawk Soccer Field; Attendance: 583; Referee: Don Eubank; Assistant referees: John Rufli; Donovan Eubank; Fourth official: Robert Musoiu

November 5, 2021	#2 SIU Edwardsville	3–0	#7 Southeast Missouri State	Martin, Tennessee
7:00 p.m.	Lydia Harris 7'; Lily Schnieders 57' (pen.); Mackenzie Litzsinger 60'	Report		Stadium: Skyhawk Soccer Field; Attendance: 103; Referee: Jeffery Hay; Assistant referees: Jeff Pulley; John Rufli; Fourth official: Ryan Starr

=== Final ===
November 7, 2021	#1 UT Martin	0–1 (a.e.t.)	#2 SIU Edwardsville	Martin, Tennessee
2:00 p.m.		Report	(yellow card) 41' Matea Diekema; 92' Mackenzie Litzsinger	Stadium: Skyhawk Soccer Field; Attendance: 617; Referee: Eric Philips; Assistant referees: Jose Renda; John Rufli; Fourth official: Gustavo Turmero

== Statistics ==
=== Goalscorers ===
There were 13 goals scored in 7 matches, for an average of 1.86 goals per match (as of November 7, 2021).

2 goals

- Mackenzie Litzsinger – SIU Edwardsville
- Lauren Welker – Southeast Missouri State

1 goal

- Sydney Cason – Belmont
- Audrey Henry – Murray State
- Lydia Harris – SIU Edwardsville
- Lily Schnieders – SIU Edwardsville
- Morgan McCourt – Southeast Missouri State
- Gabby Garcia – Tennessee Tech
- Meredith Nye – Tennessee Tech
- Chloe Smith – Tennessee Tech
- Emely van der Vliet – UT Martin

== All-Tournament team ==
Player	Team
**Lydia Harris**	SIU Edwardsville
Mackenzie Litzsinger	SIU Edwardsville
Emma Dutko	SIU Edwardsville
Myah Diekema	SIU Edwardsville
Erica Myers	UT Martin
Brooke Kala	UT Martin
Emely van der Vliet	UT Martin
Bailey Redden	Southeast Missouri State
Lauren Welker	Southeast Missouri State
Chloe Smith	Tennessee Tech
Isabelle Austin	Tennessee Tech

MVP in bold
