= High Point Panthers women's soccer =

American college soccer team

- Founded: 1992
- University: High Point University
- Head coach: Aaron McGuiness (2nd season)
- Conference: Big South
- Location: High Point, North Carolina
- Stadium: Vert Stadium (capacity: 1,100)
- Nickname: Panthers
- Colors: Purple and white
Home	Away

NCAA Tournament appearances
- 2003, 2007, 2009, 2010, 2014, 2017, 2021, 2025

Conference Tournament championships
- 2003, 2007, 2009, 2010, 2014, 2017, 2021, 2025

The High Point Panthers women's soccer team is an NCAA Division I college soccer team representing High Point University as part of the Big South Conference. They play their home games at Vert Stadium in High Point, North Carolina.

== History ==
The team was founded in 1992 as an independent Division II program, and it had a few 10-win seasons from 1993 to 1996, sandwiched by losing seasons in 1992 and 1997–98. In 1999, the Panthers jumped to NCAA Division I and the Big South Conference. The team struggled its first four years with 4- and 5-win seasons. The Panthers entered the 2003 Big South Tournament at 8–9 and the #6 seed, but surprised the conference by capturing the tournament title with a 0–0, 3–2 penalty-kick shootout win over UNC-Asheville to gain the first Division I NCAA tournament bid in High Point Panthers history. In the NCAA tournament, High Point lost 8–0 to eventual champion North Carolina. Forward Jen Evans, the career goals leader, paced the 2003 team with 10 scores, and also played a pivotal role on the 2007 squad that returned to the NCAA tournament. The Panthers once again ran into UNC in the 2007 tournament and lost 6–1, with senior Amy Anzovino providing the lone Panther score in the 55th minute.

Head coach Marty Beall took over in 2009. A long-shot to make the field in the first place, HPU entered the 2009 Big South tournament as the 7 seed at 5–14–1, but took home the conference title with a 0–0, 4–2 penalty kick shootout win over Winthrop. The team was backstopped by senior goalkeeper Marisa Abbott, who brought a 527-minute shutout streak and a whopping 120 saves on the season to the first round of the NCAA tournament, where they faced North Carolina on November 13. North Carolina outshot High Point 31–0. Abbott made 14 saves, a High Point single-game record, but the Tar Heels notched a single goal off a rebound in the 69th minute for a 1–0 win. The 2009 UNC team sported several future U.S. women's national team players including Tobin Heath, and went on to win the national title.

High Point won Big South Conference regular-season titles in 2010, 2012, 2016, and 2017, with NCAA tournament appearances coming in 2010, 2014, and 2017. In the 2010 NCAA tournament, High Point took a lead over No. 4 Maryland off freshman forward Kelli Joline's goal in the eighth minute, but the Terrapins equalized 21 seconds later and won 4–1. In 2014, High Point took the Big South conference tournament with a 2–2, 5–4 penalty-kick win over Liberty, but fell 8–0 to Virginia. In 2017, the Panthers won the Big South regular season with a 7–1–1 record and rolled to three straight conference tournament wins to capture Beall's third NCAA bid. The Panthers traveled to familiar NCAA Tournament foe North Carolina, where they dropped a 3–0 decision.

In February 2018, following Marty Beall's departure to Richmond, Brandi Fontaine was named HPU's sixth head coach of the Division I era. Fontaine had spent the last nine years as HPU's assistant coach and associate head coach.

== Individual awards ==
Big South Attacking Player of the Year

- Kelsey Perrell – 2016

Big South Defensive Player of the Year

- Alex Hank – 2015

Big South Freshman of the Year

- Skyler Prillaman – 2018

CoSIDA Academic All-American

- Becca Hemby – 2013

Big South Coach of the Year

- Marty Beall – 2012, 2016
- Brandi Fontaine – 2019

Big South Tournament MVP

- Stephanie Moenter – 2003
- Sara Rager – 2007
- Marisa Abbott – 2009
- Janay Whittaker – 2010
- Jacky Kessler – 2014
- Alex Hank – 2017

Big South Scholar-Athlete of the Year

- Traci Andersen – 2006
- Alex Torriero – 2007
- Brielle Spencer – 2010, 2011
- Becca Hemby – 2013
- Becca Rolfe – 2016

== Individual career records ==
Record	Amount	Player	Years
Goals	30	Jen Evans; Kelli Joline	2002–07; 2010–13
Assists	23	Sara Rager	2007–10
Points	77	Jen Evans	2002–07
Shots	239	Jen Evans	2002–07
Saves	262	Alex Hank	2014–17
GAA	0.86	Alex Hank	2014–17
Wins	40	Alex Hank	2014–17
Shutouts	29	Alex Hank	2014–17

== Individual single-season records ==
Record	Amount	Player	Year
Goals	10	Kelli Joline; Becca Hemby	2010; 2012
Assists	9	Sara Rager	2010
Points	27	Jen Evans	2004
Shots	93	Jen Evans	2004
Saves	134	Marisa Abbott	2009
GAA	0.49	Alex Hank	2015
Wins	12	Alex Hank	2016, 2017
Shutouts	10	Alex Hank	2015, 2016

== Seasons ==
Statistics overview
Season	Coach	Overall	Conference	Standing	Postseason
NAIA Carolinas Intercollegiate Athletic Conference (1992–1992)
1992	Woody Gibson	2–14–1			
Dual membership: NCAA DII and NAIA Carolinas Intercollegiate Athletic Conference (1993–1994)
1993	Woody Gibson	12–5–1			
1994	Woody Gibson	11–7–1			
NCAA DII Carolinas-Virginia Athletics Conference (1995–1996)
1995	Heather Puckett	12–6–2	7–3	T-4th	
1996	Heather Puckett	10–9	7–2–1	3rd	
NCAA DII Independent (1997–1998)
1997	Heather Puckett	3–12–2			
1998	Heather Puckett	5–12–1			
NCAA Division I Big South Conference (1999–Present)
1999	Traci Foels	5–12–2	1–5–1	7th	
2000	Traci Foels	4–11–2	2–3–1	5th	
2001	Traci Foels	4–12–1	2–4	T-5th	
2002	Traci Foels	4–10–4	1–2–3	5th	
2003	Traci Foels	10–10–1	3–4	6th	NCAA First Round
2004	Traci Foels	11–8–1	4–4	5th	
2005	Michelle Rayner	10–7–1	5–3	T-2nd	
2006	Michelle Rayner	4–15	3–5	T-6th	
2007	Michelle Rayner	11–8–3	5–2	T-2nd	NCAA First Round
2008	Michelle Rayner	8–5–8	3–2–4	5th	
2009	Marty Beall	7–15–2	4–4–1	7th	NCAA First Round
2010	Marty Beall	11–11–1	6–2–1	T-1st	NCAA First Round
2011	Marty Beall	8–10–3	6–2–2	4th	
2012	Marty Beall	10–6–6	8–1–2	1st	
2013	Marty Beall	9–10–1	6–4–1	6th	
2014	Marty Beall	12–5–4	7–2–1	T-2nd	NCAA First Round
2015	Marty Beall	12–5–4	6–3–1	4th	
2016	Marty Beall	13–6–2	7–1–1	1st	
2017	Marty Beall	13–7–1	7–1–1	1st	NCAA First Round
2018	Brandi Fontaine	5–10–4	3–4–3	8th	
2019	Brandi Fontaine	10–7–2	8–0–2	1st	
Total:		235–254–61 (.481)			
National champion Postseason invitational champion Conference regular season champion Conference regular season and conference tournament champion Division regular season champion Division regular season and conference tournament champion Conference tournament champion

=== NCAA tournament results ===
Year	Round	Opponent	Score
2003	First Round	North Carolina	L 8–0
2007	First Round	North Carolina	L 6–1
2009	First Round	North Carolina	L 1–0
2010	First Round	Maryland	L 4–1
2014	First Round	Virginia	L 8–0
2017	First Round	North Carolina	L 3–0
