= 2021 NCAA Division I women's soccer rankings =

- Season: 2021
- NCAA tournament: 2021
- Preseason No. 1: Florida State (USC); Santa Clara (TDS)
- NCAA Tournament Champions: Florida State
NCAA Division I women's soccer rankings


Two major human polls made up the 2021 NCAA Division I women's soccer rankings: United Soccer Coaches and Top Drawer Soccer. They represented the ranking system for the 2021 NCAA Division I women's soccer season.

== Legend ==
	Increase in ranking
	Decrease in ranking
	New to rankings from previous week
Italics	Number of first place votes
(#–#–#)	Win–loss–tie record
т	Tied with team above or below also with this symbol

== United Soccer Coaches ==
	Preseason Aug 4	Week 1 Aug 24	Week 2 Aug 30	Week 3 Sep 7	Week 4 Sep 14	Week 5 Sep 21	Week 6 Sep 28	Week 7 Oct 5	Week 8 Oct 12	Week 9 Oct 19	Week 10 Oct 26	Week 11 Nov 2	Week 12 Nov 9	Final Dec 7	
1.	Florida State (11)	Florida State (2–0–0) (26)	Florida State (3–0–0) (32)	Florida State (5–0–0) (29)	Florida State (7–0–0) (32)	Florida State (8–0–0) (33)	Florida State (10–0–0) (33)	Florida State (11–0–0) (29)	Florida State (13–0–0) (31)	Florida State (14–0–0) (31)	Virginia (15–1–1) (26)	Virginia (15–1–2) (28)	Florida State (16–1–2) (29)	Florida State (22–1–2) (25)	1.
2.	Santa Clara (18)	North Carolina (2–0–0) (4)	North Carolina (4–0–0) (1)	North Carolina (6–0–0) (2)	North Carolina (8–0–0) (1)	Duke (7–0–0)	Virginia (10–1–0) (1)	Virginia (10–1–1) (1)	Virginia (12–1–1) (1)	Virginia (13–1–1) (2)	Duke (12–2–1) (2)	Florida State (14–1–2) (2)	Virginia (16–2–2) (3)	BYU (16–5–2) (4)	2.
3.	North Carolina (3)	Virginia (2–0–0) (1)	Virginia (4–0–0)	Virginia (6–0–0) (1)	UCLA (6–0–0) (1)	UCLA (8–0–0) (1)	UCLA (8–0–1)	UCLA (10–0–1) (3)	North Carolina (10–1–2)	Pepperdine (13–1–0)	Florida State (14–1–1) (5)	UCLA (15–0–3) (2)	UCLA (16–0–3) (2)	Rutgers (18–4–2) (2)	3.
4.	Virginia (1)	UCLA (2–0–0) (2)	UCLA (3–0–0) (1)	UCLA (4–0–0) (2)	Duke (8–0–0)	North Carolina (7–1–0)	Duke (7–1–1)	Duke (8–1–1) (1)	Pepperdine (12–1–0) (2)	Arkansas (12–2–0) (1)	Arkansas (14–2–0) (1)	Rutgers (16–2–0) (2)	Duke (13–3–1)	Santa Clara (15–5–3) (3)	4.
5.	UCLA	Duke (2–0–0)	Duke (4–0–0)	Duke (5–0–0)	TCU (8–0–0)	LSU (8–0–0)	North Carolina (8–1–1)	North Carolina (8–1–2)	USC (10–2–0)	USC (11–2–0)	UCLA (13–0–3)	Arkansas (14–3–0)	Rutgers (17–3–0)	Duke (15–4–1)	5.
6.	Duke	TCU (2–0–0)	TCU (3–0–0)	TCU (5–0–0)	LSU (7–0–0)	Pepperdine (9–1–0)	Pepperdine (9–1–0)	Pepperdine (10–1–0)	Arkansas (11–2–0)	Duke (10–2–1)	Rutgers (15–2–0)	Duke (13–3–1)	Tennessee (18–2–0)	Arkansas (19–4–1)	6.
7.	Clemson	Penn State (2–0–0)	Penn State (3–0–0)	LSU (6–0–0)	Virginia (8–1–0)	Virginia (8–1–0)	Stanford (7–2–0)	Arkansas (9–2–0)	UCLA (11–0–2)	North Carolina (10–2–2)	North Carolina (11–2–3)	North Carolina (12–2–3)	Arkansas (16–4–0)	Michigan (18–4–3)	7.
8.	TCU	Pepperdine (2–0–0)	Georgetown (2–0–1)	Santa Clara (3–1–2)	Penn State (6–1–0)	TCU (7–1–0)	Arkansas (8–2–0)	Rutgers (9–2–0)	Duke (9–2–1)	UCLA (12–0–2)	TCU (14–2–1)	USC (13–2–2)	TCU (17–2–2)	Virginia (18–3–2)	8.
9.	Texas A&M	Clemson (2–0–0)	Santa Clara (2–0–2)	Rutgers (4–0–0)	Pepperdine (7–1–0)	Rutgers (6–2–0)	Rutgers (7–2–0)	West Virginia (8–2–1)	Rutgers (11–2–0)	Rutgers (13–2–0)	Stanford (12–3–1)	TCU (15–2–2)	Michigan (15–3–3)	TCU (19–2–3)	9.
10.	Penn State	Santa Clara (1–0–1) (1)	Stanford (3–0–0)	Auburn (5–0–0)	Stanford (5–2–0)	Stanford (6–2–0)	TCU (8–2–0)	Hofstra (10–1–0)	Tennessee (12–1–0)	Tennessee (13–1–0)	USC (11–2–2)	Tennessee (15–2–0)	North Carolina (12–2–3)	South Carolina (14–7–1)	10.
11.	Georgetown	Georgetown (1–0–1)	Auburn (3–0–0)	Stanford (3–2–0)	Santa Clara (3–2–2)	Auburn (7–1–0)	Hofstra (9–1–0)	USC (8–2–0)	TCU (11–2–1)	TCU (13–2–1)	BYU (11–3–1)	Xavier (16–1–1)	USC (13–3–2)	Tennessee (20–3–0)	11.
12.	West Virginia	West Virginia (1–1–0)	South Carolina (3–0–0)	South Carolina (4–0–0)	Auburn (7–2–0)	Penn State (6–2–0)	West Virginia (7–2–1)	Tennessee (10–1–0)	Hofstra (12–1–0)	BYU (9–3–1)	Tennessee (14–2–0)	BYU (11–4–1)	Santa Clara (11–5–2)	USC (14–3–3)	12.
13.	Arkansas	Stanford (1–0–0)	West Virginia (3–1–0)	Pepperdine (5–1–0)	Tennessee (7–0–1)	West Virginia (6–2–1)	Auburn (8–2–0)	TCU (9–2–1)	Stanford (10–3–0)	Ole Miss (11–2–2)	Pepperdine (13–2–1)	Michigan (13–3–3)	BYU (13–4–1)	Pepperdine (17–4–1)	13.
14.	USC	Auburn (2–0–0)	BYU (2–1–0)	Penn State (4–1–0)	UCF (5–2–0)	Hofstra (8–1–0)	SMU (7–1–0)	Stanford (8–3–0)	Memphis (10–1–1)	Stanford (10–3–1)	SMU (10–2–2)	Stanford (12–5–1)	Xavier (16–1–1)	North Carolina (12–3–3)	14.
15.	BYU	South Florida (2–0–0)	Clemson (2–1–0)	Memphis (5–0–1)	West Virginia (4–2–1)	Arizona State (8–1–0)	Tennessee (9–1–0)	SMU (7–1–1)	BYU (8–3–1)	Notre Dame (12–2–1)	Xavier (16–1–1)	Santa Clara (9–5–2)	Washington State (13–2–4)	UCLA (16–1–3)	15.
16.	Oklahoma State	South Carolina (1–0–0)	Rutgers (2–0–0)	Michigan (5–1–0)	Rutgers (4–2–0)	Arkansas (6–2–0)	Gonzaga (10–1–0)	Michigan (8–1–3)	Harvard (9–0–1)	SMU (8–2–2)	Ole Miss (11–3–3)	Pepperdine (14–2–1)	Brown (12–3–0)	Notre Dame (14–6–2)	16.
17.	South Carolina	Tennessee (1–0–0)	LSU (4–0–0)	UCF (3–2–0)	Xavier (7–0–0)	SMU (6–1–0)	Michigan (7–1–2)	Virginia Tech (8–2–2)	Notre Dame (12–1–1)	Xavier (14–1–1)	Michigan (12–3–3)	SMU (11–3–2)	Ole Miss (12–5–3)	Washington State (14–3–4)	17.
18.	Vanderbilt	Michigan (2–0–0)	UCF (2–1–0)	West Virginia (3–2–0)	BYU (5–2–1)	Michigan (7–1–1)	Wisconsin (7–1–3)	Harvard (8–0–1)	Ole Miss (10–2–2)	Purdue (11–3–2)	Purdue (13–3–2)	Washington State (12–2–4)	Memphis (13–4–2)	Ole Miss (12–6–3)	18.
19.	Washington	UCF (1–0–0)	Rice (4–0–0)	Tennessee (6–0–0)	Pittsburgh (7–1–0)	Santa Clara (3–3–2)	Virginia Tech (7–2–2)	South Carolina (9–2–0)	Purdue (10–2–2)	Auburn (11–3–0)	Auburn (11–4–1)	Purdue (14–3–2)	Pepperdine (15–3–1)	Xavier (16–3–1)	19.
20.	South Florida	California (1–0–1)	Pittsburgh (4–0–0)	Pittsburgh (5–1–0)	Arizona State (7–1–0)	Gonzaga (9–1–0)	Harvard (7–0–1)	BYU (6–3–1)	SMU (8–2–1)	Georgetown (9–0–6)	Texas (9–3–5)	Texas (11–3–5)	Stanford (13–5–1)	Memphis (14–5–2)	20.
21.	Saint Louis	Texas A&M (0–2–0)	Arizona State (4–0–0)	Texas Tech (5–0–1)	Michigan (6–2–1)	Xavier (7–0–1)	USC (6–2–0)	Memphis (8–1–1)	West Virginia (8–3–2)	Texas (8–3–4)	Georgetown (11–0–6)	Ole Miss (11–4–3)	Texas (11–4–6)	SMU (12–5–2)	21.
22.	Rice	Rutgers (1–0–0)	Tennessee (4–0–0)	BYU (3–2–0)	Princeton (5–0–1)	Clemson (6–2–0)	Memphis (8–1–1)	Auburn (8–3–0)	Michigan (9–2–3)	South Florida (9–3–2)	Notre Dame (12–4–1)	Brown (11–3–0)	Georgetown (12–1–6)	Georgetown (14–2–6)	22.
23.	Ole Miss	Rice (2–0–0)	Pepperdine (3–1–0)	Xavier (5–0–0)	Hofstra (7–1–0)	Harvard (6–0–1)	Georgetown (5–0–5)	Baylor (7–2–3)	Auburn (10–3–0)	Memphis (10–2–1)	South Florida (10–3–2)	South Florida (11–3–2)	South Florida (12–3–3)	Penn State (12–8–1)	23.
24.	Stanford	BYU (1–1–0)	Michigan (4–0–0)	Georgetown (2–0–3)	SMU (4–2–0)	Rice (7–2–1)	LSU (8–2–0)	Notre Dame (10–1–1)	Oregon State (11–2–0)	Penn State (10–5–0)	Brown (10–3–0)	Clemson (12–5–1)	Purdue (14–4–2)	Purdue (15–4–3)	24.
25.	Rutgers	USC (0–1–0)	Hofstra (3–1–0)	Hofstra (5–1–0)	Georgetown (3–0–4)	Georgetown (4–0–4)	South Carolina (8–2–0)	Purdue (9–2–2)	Texas (8–3–3)	Hofstra (12–2–1)	Santa Clara (8–5–2)	Wake Forest (15–4–0)	SMU (11–4–2)	Wake Forest (16–6–0)	25.
	Preseason Aug 4	Week 1 Aug 24	Week 2 Aug 30	Week 3 Sep 7	Week 4 Sep 14	Week 5 Sep 21	Week 6 Sep 28	Week 7 Oct 5	Week 8 Oct 12	Week 9 Oct 19	Week 10 Oct 26	Week 11 Nov 2	Week 12 Nov 9	Final Dec 7	
		Dropped: No. 13 Arkansas; No. 16 Oklahoma State; No. 18 Vanderbilt; No. 19 Washington; No. 21 Saint Louis; No. 23 Ole Miss	Dropped: No. 15 South Florida; No. 20 California; No. 21 Texas A&M; No. 25 USC	Dropped: No. 15 Clemson; No. 19 Rice; No. 21 Arizona State	Dropped: No. 12 South Carolina; No. 15 Memphis; No. 21 Texas Tech	Dropped: No. 13 Tennessee; No. 14 UCF; No. 18 BYU; No. 19 Pittsburgh; No. 22 Princeton	Dropped: No. 12 Penn State; No. 15 Arizona State; No. 19 Santa Clara; No. 21 Xavier; No. 22 Clemson; No. 24 Rice	Dropped: No. 16 Gonzaga; No. 18 Wisconsin; No. 23 Georgetown; No. 24 LSU	Dropped: No. 17 Virginia Tech; No. 19 South Carolina; No. 23 Baylor	Dropped: No. 16 Harvard; No. 21 West Virginia; No. 22 Michigan; No. 24 Oregon State	Dropped: No. 23 Memphis; No. 24 Penn State; No. 25 Hofstra	Dropped: No. 19 Auburn; No. 21 Georgetown; No. 22 Notre Dame	Dropped: No. 24 Clemson; No. 25 Wake Forest	Dropped: No. 16 Brown; No. 20 Stanford; No. 21 Texas; No. 23 South Florida	

== Top Drawer Soccer ==
	Week 1 Aug 19	Week 2 Aug 23	Week 3 Aug 30	Week 4 Sep 6	Week 5 Sep 13	Week 6 Sep 20	Week 7 Sep 27	Week 8 Oct 4	Week 9 Oct 11	Week 10 Oct 18	Week 11 Oct 25	Week 12 Nov 1	Week 13 Nov 8	Week 14 Nov 15	Week 15 Nov 22	Week 16 Nov 29	Final Dec 6	
1.	Santa Clara	Santa Clara (1–0–1)	Florida State (4–0–0)	Florida State (5–0–0)	Florida State (7–0–0)	Florida State (8–0–0)	Florida State (10–0–0)	Florida State (11–0–0)	Florida State (13–0–0)	Florida State (14–0–0)	Virginia (15–1–1)	Virginia (15–1–2)	Florida State (16–1–2)	Florida State (17–1–2)	Florida State (19–1–2)	Florida State (20–1–2)	Florida State (21–1–2)	1.
2.	Florida State	Florida State (2–0–0)	Virginia (4–0–0)	Virginia (6–0–0)	North Carolina (7–0–0)	UCLA (8–0–0)	Virginia (10–1–0)	Virginia (10–1–1)	Virginia (12–1–1)	Virginia (13–1–1)	Florida State (14–1–1)	Florida State (14–1–2)	UCLA (16–0–3)	Virginia (17–2–2)	Rutgers (19–3–1)	Rutgers (19–3–2)	BYU (17–4–2)	2.
3.	Virginia	Virginia (2–0–0)	North Carolina (4–0–0)	North Carolina (6–0–0)	UCLA (5–0–0)	Duke (7–0–0)	UCLA (8–0–1)	UCLA (10–0–1)	North Carolina (10–1–2)	UCLA (12–0–2)	UCLA (13–0–3)	UCLA (15–0–3)	Virginia (16–2–2)	TCU (18–2–2)	Arkansas (19–4–0)	BYU (17–4–1)	Rutgers (19–4–2)	3.
4.	North Carolina	North Carolina (2–0–0)	Santa Clara (2–0–2)	UCLA (4–0–0)	Duke (6–0–0)	North Carolina (7–1–0)	North Carolina (8–1–1)	North Carolina (8–1–2)	UCLA (11–0–2)	Pepperdine (13–1–0)	Arkansas (14–2–0)	North Carolina (12–2–3)	North Carolina (12–2–3)	Tennessee (19–2–0)	Duke (16–3–1)	Santa Clara (15–5–2)	Santa Clara (15–5–3)	4.
5.	UCLA	UCLA (2–0–0)	UCLA (3–0–0)	Duke (5–0–0)	TCU (7–0–0)	Virginia (8–1–0)	Pepperdine (9–1–0)	Pepperdine (10–1–0)	Pepperdine (12–1–0)	Arkansas (12–2–0)	North Carolina (11–2–3)	Rutgers (16–2–0)	TCU (17–2–2)	Rutgers (18–3–0)	Michigan (18–3–3)	Arkansas (19–4–1)	Arkansas (19–4–1)	5.
6.	USC	Duke (2–0–0)	Duke (4–0–0)	TCU (5–0–0)	Penn State (6–1–0)	LSU (8–0–0)	Duke (7–1–1)	Duke (8–1–1)	Hofstra (12–1–0)	North Carolina (10–2–2)	TCU (14–2–1)	Arkansas (14–3–0)	Tennessee (18–2–0)	Arkansas (17–4–0)	BYU (16–4–1)	Duke (16–4–1)	Duke (16–4–1)	6.
7.	Duke	Clemson (2–0–0)	Georgetown (2–0–1)	South Carolina (4–0–0)	Virginia (7–1–0)	Pepperdine (9–1–0)	Hofstra (9–1–0)	Hofstra (10–1–0)	Arkansas (10–2–0)	TCU (13–2–1)	Rutgers (14–3–0)	TCU (15–2–2)	Rutgers (17–3–0)	Pepperdine (16–3–1)	Santa Clara (14–5–2)	Michigan (18–4–3)	Michigan (18–4–3)	7.
8.	Clemson	Georgetown (1–0–1)	TCU (3–0–0)	Santa Clara (3–1–2)	LSU (7–0–0)	TCU (7–1–0)	Arkansas (7–2–0)	Arkansas (8–2–0)	Harvard (9–0–1)	Tennessee (13–1–0)	Duke (12–2–1)	Pepperdine (14–2–1)	Arkansas (16–4–0)	USC (14–3–2)	South Carolina (14–6–1)	South Carolina (14–7–1)	South Carolina (14–7–1)	8.
9.	Georgetown	TCU (2–0–0)	South Carolina (3–0–0)	LSU (6–0–0)	Hofstra (7–1–0)	Penn State (6–2–0)	West Virginia (7–2–1)	West Virginia (8–2–1)	TCU (11–2–1)	Rutgers (13–2–0)	Pepperdine (13–2–1)	Tennessee (15–2–0)	Brown (12–3–0)	Duke (14–3–1)	Virginia (18–3–2)	Virginia (18–3–2)	Virginia (18–3–2)	9.
10.	Arkansas	South Carolina (1–0–0)	Clemson (2–1–0)	Rutgers (4–0–0)	Tennessee (7–0–0)	Hofstra (8–1–0)	Harvard (7–0–1)	Harvard (8–0–1)	Tennessee (12–1–0)	Duke (10–2–1)	Tennessee (14–2–0)	USC (13–2–2)	Pepperdine (15–3–1)	Michigan (16–3–3)	TCU (19–2–3)	TCU (19–2–3)	TCU (19–2–3)	10.
11.	TCU	South Florida (2–0–0)	Penn State (3–0–0)	Penn State (4–1–0)	Pepperdine (7–1–0)	Arkansas (5–2–0)	TCU (8–2–0)	TCU (9–2–1)	Rutgers (11–2–0)	USC (11–2–0)	USC (11–2–2)	Duke (13–2–1)	USC (13–3–2)	Georgetown (14–1–6)	Tennessee (20–3–0)	Tennessee (20–3–0)	Tennessee (20–3–0)	11.
12.	BYU	USC (0–1–0)	BYU (2–1–0)	Hofstra (5–1–0)	Georgetown (3–0–4)	Georgetown (4–0–4)	Tennessee (9–1–0)	Tennessee (10–1–0)	Duke (9–2–1)	Hofstra (12–2–1)	Brown (10–3–0)	Brown (11–3–0)	Duke (13–3–1)	BYU (14–4–1)	Pepperdine (17–4–1)	Pepperdine (17–4–1)	Pepperdine (17–4–1)	12.
13.	Texas A&M	Penn State (2–0–0)	Rice (4–0–0)	Georgetown (2–0–3)	Santa Clara (3–2–2)	Auburn (7–1–0)	Stanford (7–2–0)	South Carolina (9–2–0)	Notre Dame (12–1–1)	Brown (9–3–0)	Stanford (12–3–1)	Xavier (16–1–1)	Princeton (14–2–1)	UCLA (16–1–3)	USC (14–3–3)	USC (14–3–3)	Penn State (12–8–1)	13.
14.	West Virginia	Hofstra (2–0–0)	Hofstra (3–1–0)	Rice (5–0–1)	Arkansas (3–2–0)	West Virginia (6–2–1)	LSU (8–2–0)	Rutgers (9–2–0)	West Virginia (8–3–2)	Notre Dame (12–2–1)	Xavier (16–1–1)	Princeton (13–2–1)	Michigan (15–3–3)	North Carolina (12–3–3)	Georgetown (14–2–6)	Georgetown (14–2–6)	Wisconsin (10–6–6)	14.
15.	South Carolina	BYU (1–1–0)	Rutgers (2–0–0)	Texas A&M (3–2–0)	Texas A&M (4–2–1)	Harvard (6–0–1)	Georgetown (5–0–5)	Notre Dame (10–1–1)	Memphis (10–1–1)	Harvard (9–1–1)	Georgetown (11–0–6)	Michigan (13–3–3)	Stanford (13–5–1)	Brown (12–4–0)	UCLA (16–1–3)	UCLA (16–1–3)	Notre Dame (14–6–2)	15.
16.	Saint Louis	Rice (2–0–0)	LSU (4–0–0)	Auburn (5–0–0)	Auburn (6–1–0)	Clemson (6–2–0)	Auburn (8–2–0)	SMU (7–1–1)	Stanford (10–3–0)	Stanford (10–3–1)	SMU (10–2–2)	Stanford (12–5–1)	Georgetown (13–1–6)	Princeton (15–2–1)	North Carolina (12–3–3)	North Carolina (12–3–3)	UCLA (16–1–3)	16.
17.	Oklahoma State	Vanderbilt (1–0–1)	West Virginia (3–1–0)	Tennessee (6–0–0)	West Virginia (4–2–1)	Tennessee (7–1–0)	South Carolina (8–2–0)	Princeton (9–1–1)	USC (10–2–0)	Xavier (14–1–1)	Notre Dame (12–4–1)	Georgetown (11–1–6)	BYU (13–4–1)	Hofstra (17–3–1)	Brown (12–4–0)	Brown (12–4–0)	North Carolina (12–3–3)	17.
18.	Washington	West Virginia (1–1–0)	Texas A&M (1–2–0)	Arkansas (1–2–0)	BYU (4–2–1)	Stanford (6–2–0)	Clemson (7–3–0)	Memphis (8–1–1)	Xavier (12–1–1)	Auburn (11–3–0)	Princeton (12–2–1)	SMU (11–3–2)	Xavier (16–2–1)	Memphis (14–4–2)	Princeton (15–3–1)	Princeton (15–3–1)	USC (14–3–3)	18.
19.	South Florida	Arkansas (0–2–0)	Auburn (3–0–0)	West Virginia (3–2–0)	Harvard (4–0–1)	South Carolina (6–2–0)	Rutgers (7–2–0)	Stanford (8–3–0)	Auburn (10–3–0)	West Virginia (9–4–2)	BYU (11–3–1)	BYU (11–4–1)	Hofstra (16–3–1)	Purdue (15–4–2)	Hofstra (17–4–1)	Hofstra (17–4–1)	Princeton (15–3–1)	19.
20.	Penn State	Texas A&M (0–2–0)	Arkansas (0–2–0)	BYU (3–2–0)	Pittsburgh (7–1–0)	Arizona State (8–1–0)	Notre Dame (9–1–1)	USC (8–2–0)	SMU (8–2–1)	SMU (8–2–2)	Auburn (11–4–1)	Purdue (14–3–2)	Memphis (13–4–2)	Notre Dame (14–5–1)	Memphis (14–5–2)	Memphis (14–5–2)	Hofstra (17–4–1)	20.
21.	Vanderbilt	Rutgers (1–0–0)	Pittsburgh (4–0–0)	Harvard (3–0–0)	Clemson (5–2–0)	Rutgers (6–2–0)	Michigan (7–1–2)	Xavier (10–1–1)	Georgetown (8–0–6)	Georgetown (9–0–6)	West Virginia (9–4–4)	Hofstra (14–3–1)	Purdue (14–4–2)	Santa Clara (12–5–2)	Purdue (15–4–3)	Purdue (15–4–3)	Georgetown (14–2–6)	21.
22.	Rice	Auburn (2–0–0)	Oklahoma State (3–1–0)	Pittsburgh (5–1–0)	South Carolina (5–2–0)	Notre Dame (7–1–1)	SMU (7–1–0)	Michigan (8–1–3)	Brown (8–3–0)	Memphis (10–2–1)	Michigan (12–3–3)	South Florida (11–3–2)	South Florida (12–3–3)	South Carolina (12–6–1)	Notre Dame (14–6–2)	Notre Dame (14–6–2)	Memphis (14–5–2)	22.
23.	Hofstra	Pittsburgh (2–0–0)	South Florida (3–1–0)	Clemson (3–2–0)	Arizona State (7–1–0)	Michigan (7–1–1)	Penn State (6–4–0)	Auburn (8–3–0)	Wake Forest (12–2–0)	Princeton (10–2–1)	Purdue (13–3–2)	Auburn (11–5–1)	Notre Dame (13–5–1)	Milwaukee (19–1–0)	Milwaukee (19–2–0)	Milwaukee (19–2–0)	St. John's (12–8–3)	23.
24.	Rutgers	Oklahoma State (1–1–0)	Michigan (4–0–0)	Brown (3–1–0)	Notre Dame (6–1–1)	SMU (6–1–0)	Princeton (7–1–1)	Georgetown (6–0–6)	Princeton (9–2–1)	BYU (9–3–1)	Hofstra (13–3–1)	Texas (11–3–5)	Auburn (12–6–1)	SMU (12–4–2)	Penn State (12–8–1)	Penn State (12–8–1)	Brown (12–4–0)	24.
25.	Brown	Brown (0–0–0)	Arizona State (4–0–0)	Michigan (5–1–0)	Michigan (6–1–1)	Santa Clara (3–3–2)	Memphis (8–1–1)	Virginia Tech (8–2–2)	Michigan (9–2–3)	VCU (12–2–0)	South Florida (10–3–2)	Notre Dame (13–5–1)	Texas (11–4–6)	Washington State (14–2–4)	Washington State (14–3–4)	Washington State (14–3–4)	Purdue (15–4–3)	25.
	Week 1 Aug 19	Week 2 Aug 23	Week 3 Aug 30	Week 4 Sep 6	Week 5 Sep 13	Week 6 Sep 20	Week 7 Sep 27	Week 8 Oct 4	Week 9 Oct 11	Week 10 Oct 18	Week 11 Oct 25	Week 12 Nov 1	Week 13 Nov 8	Week 14 Nov 15	Week 15 Nov 22	Week 16 Nov 29	Final Dec 6	
		Dropped: No. 16 Saint Louis; No. 18 Washington	Dropped: No. 12 USC; No. 17 Vanderbilt; No. 25 Brown	Dropped: No. 22 Oklahoma State; No. 23 South Florida; No. 25 Arizona State	Dropped: No. 10 Rutgers; No. 14 Rice; No. 24 Brown	Dropped: No. 15 Texas A&M; No. 18 BYU; No. 20 Pittsburgh	Dropped: No. 20 Arizona State; No. 25 Santa Clara	Dropped: No. 14 LSU; No. 18 Clemson; No. 23 Penn State	Dropped: No. 13 South Carolina; No. 25 Virginia Tech	Dropped: No. 23 Wake Forest; No. 25 Michigan	Dropped: No. 15 Harvard; No. 22 Memphis; No. 25 VCU	Dropped: No. 21 West Virginia	Dropped: No. 18 SMU	Dropped: No. 15 Stanford; No. 18 Xavier; No. 22 South Florida; No. 24 Auburn; No. 25 Texas	Dropped: No. 24 SMU	Dropped: None	Dropped: No. 23 Milwaukee; No. 25 Washington State	
