= 2021 Atlantic Coast Conference women's soccer season =

- League: NCAA Division I
- Sport: Soccer
- Duration: August 19, 2021 – October 28, 2021
- Teams: 14

2022 NWSL Draft
- Top draft pick: Jaelin Howell
- Picked by: Racing Louisville FC, 2nd overall

Regular season
- Season champions: Virginia
- Runners-up: Florida State
- Season MVP: Offensive:Diana Ordoñez; Midfielder:Jaelin Howell; Defensive:Emily Madril
- Top scorer: Diana Ordoñez

Tournament
- Champions: Florida State
- Runners-up: Virginia
- Finals MVP: Clara Robbins (Florida State)

ACC women's soccer seasons
- ← 2020 2022 →

2021 ACC women's soccer standings
	Conf.						Overall
Team	W		L		T	PCT	W		L		T	PCT
No. 8 Virginia ‍†‍‍^{y}	8	–	0	–	2	.900	18	–	3	–	2	.826
No. 1 Florida State ‍‍‡‍^{y}	7	–	1	–	2	.800	21	–	1	–	3	.900
No. 5 Duke ‍‍‍^{y}	7	–	2	–	1	.750	16	–	4	–	1	.786
No. 16 Notre Dame ‍‍‍^{y}	7	–	3	–	0	.700	14	–	6	–	2	.682
Clemson ‍‍‍^{y}	6	–	3	–	1	.650	12	–	7	–	1	.625
No. 14 North Carolina ‍‍‍^{y}	5	–	2	–	3	.650	12	–	3	–	3	.750
No. 25 Wake Forest ‍‍‍^{y}	6	–	4	–	0	.600	16	–	6	–	0	.727
Virginia Tech ‍‍‍^{y}	5	–	3	–	2	.600	12	–	6	–	2	.650
Pittsburgh ‍‍‍	4	–	6	–	0	.400	11	–	7	–	0	.611
NC State ‍‍‍^{y}	4	–	6	–	0	.400	9	–	9	–	2	.500
Louisville ‍‍‍	3	–	6	–	1	.350	7	–	7	–	2	.500
Boston College ‍‍‍	1	–	9	–	0	.100	7	–	10	–	1	.417
Miami (FL) ‍‍‍	1	–	9	–	0	.100	4	–	12	–	0	.250
Syracuse ‍‍‍	0	–	10	–	0	.000	4	–	12	–	1	.265
† – Conference champion ‡ – 2021 ACC Tournament champion y – Invited to the NCAA Tournament; As of December 7, 2021; Rankings from United Soccer Coaches Poll; Source: The ACC

The 2021 Atlantic Coast Conference women's soccer season was the 33rd season of women's varsity soccer in the conference.

Florida State and North Carolina are the defending regular season champions. The Seminoles were the defending ACC tournament champions.

The regular season champions were the Virginia Cavaliers. The Florida State Seminoles won the ACC tournament and the NCAA tournament.

== Teams ==
=== Stadiums and locations ===
Team	Stadium	Capacity
Boston College Eagles	Newton Soccer Complex	2,500
Clemson Tigers	Riggs Field	6,500
Duke Blue Devils	Koskinen Stadium	7,000
Florida State Seminoles	Seminole Soccer Complex	1,600
Louisville Cardinals	Lynn Stadium	5,300
Miami Hurricanes	Cobb Stadium	500
NC State	Dail Soccer Field	3,000
North Carolina Tar Heels	Dorrance Field	5,025
Notre Dame Fighting Irish	Alumni Stadium	2,500
Pittsburgh Panthers	Ambrose Urbanic Field	735
Syracuse Orange	SU Soccer Stadium	5,000
Virginia Cavaliers	Klöckner Stadium	8,000
Virginia Tech Hokies	Thompson Field	2,500
Wake Forest Demon Deacons	Spry Stadium	3,000

1. Georgia Tech does not sponsor women's soccer

== Coaches ==
=== Head coaching records ===
Team	Head coach	Years at school	Overall record	Record at school	ACC record
Boston College	Jason Lowe	3	11–18–3	11–18–3	2–15–1
Clemson	Eddie Radwanski	11	244–130–37	105–65–24	44–49–8
Duke	Robbie Church	21	344–180–70	256–131–59	97–61–33
Florida State	Mark Krikorian	17	364–96–36	289–66–33	111–32–25
Louisville	Karen Ferguson-Dayes	21	187–168–37	187–168–37	27–32–10
Miami	Sarah Barnes	4	72–70–20	12–29–6	5–21–2
North Carolina	Anson Dorrance	43	851–70–38	851–70–38	208–26–10
NC State	Tim Santoro	9	67–73–15	67–73–15	19–46–8
Notre Dame	Nate Norman	4	83–60–16	25–25–2	12–14–2
Pittsburgh	Randy Waldrum	4	419–135–33	20–27–4	12–26–2
Syracuse	Nicky Adams	3	91–73–25	4–18–2	2–14–1
Virginia	Steve Swanson	21	433–161–62	329–98–51	130–46–21
Virginia Tech	Charles Adair	11	126–62–20	126–62–20	46–43–13
Wake Forest	Tony da Luz	24	313–221–52	268-180-50	90–106–23

Notes

- Records shown are prior to the 2021 season
- Years at school includes the 2021 season

== Pre-season ==
=== Hermann Trophy Watchlist ===
The Hermann Trophy Watchlist was released on August 19, 2021

Player	Class	Position	School
Megan Bornkamp	Sophomore	DF	Clemson
Sophie Jones	Junior	MF	Duke
Jaelin Howell	Senior	MF	Florida State
Emily Madril	Senior	DF	Florida State
Yujie Zhao	Senior	MF	Florida State
Claudia Dickey	Senior	GK	North Carolina
Rachel Jones	Senior	FW	North Carolina
Lia Godfrey	Sophomore	MF	Virginia
Haley Hopkins	Graduate Student	MF	Virginia
Alexa Spaanstra	Senior	FW	Virginia

=== Pre-season poll ===
The 2020 ACC Preseason Poll was announced on September 8, 2021. The defending regular season champions, Florida State and North Carolina were voted in first and second place, respectively. The leagues 14 head coaches also voted on a preseason All-ACC team. Full results for the coaches poll and preseason team are shown below.

==== Pre-season Coaches Poll ====
Predicted finish	Team	Points (1st place)
1	Florida State	167 (11)
2	North Carolina	155 (2)
3	Virginia	148 (1)
4	Duke	129
5	Clemson	124
6	Notre Dame	104
7	Virginia Tech	85
8	Louisville	77
9	Wake Forest	72
10	NC State	71
11	Pittsburgh	57
12	Boston College	45
13	Syracuse	24
14	Miami	16

==== Pre-season All-ACC Team ====
Position	Player	Class	School
Goalkeeper	Hensley Hancuff	Senior	Clemson
Defender	Maycee Bell	Junior	North Carolina
Defender	Delaney Graham	Senior	Duke
Midfielder	Megan Bornkamp	Sophomore	Clemson
Midfielder	Sophie Jones	Junior	Duke
Midfielder	Jaelin Howell	Senior	Florida State
Midfielder	Yujie Zhao	Senior	Florida State
Midfielder	Lia Godfrey	Sophomore	Virginia
Forward	Rachel Jones	Senior	North Carolina
Forward	Amanda West	Sophomore	Pittsburgh
Forward	Alexa Spaanstra	Senior	Virginia

== Regular season ==
=== Conference Matrix ===
The table below shows head-to-head results between teams in conference play. Each team plays ten matches. Each team does not play every other team.

	Boston College	Clemson	Duke	Florida State	Louisville	Miami	NC State	North Carolina	Notre Dame	Pittsburgh	Syracuse	Virginia	Virginia Tech	Wake Forest
vs. Boston College	–	4–1	–	4–1	1–2	1–0	–	2–1 (OT)	4–1	3–0	–	3–0	1–0	1–0
vs. Clemson	1–4	–	–	4–1	1–1 (2OT)	0–1	1–2	3–0	2–1 (2OT)	0–2	0–8	–	0–1	–
vs. Duke	–	–	–	0–1	0–1	–	2–1 (2OT)	0–1	1–0 (OT)	0–5	0–2	1–0	1–1 (2OT)	0–2
vs. Florida State	1–4	1–4	1–0	–	0–3	1–4	–	2–2 (2OT)	–	0–5	0–5	1–1 (2OT)	0–2	–
vs. Louisville	2–1	1–1 (2OT)	1–0	3–0	–	2–3 (2OT)	2–1	–	3–0	–	1–2	4–1	–	1–2 (OT)
vs. Miami	0–1	1–0	–	4–1	3–2 (2OT)	–	–	4–0	5–0	2–0	–	6–1	5–0	2–1 (2OT)
vs. NC State	–	1–2	1–2 (2OT)	–	1–2	–	–	0–1	2–1	2–0	0–3	2–1	1–0	1–0
vs. North Carolina	1–2 (OT)	0–3	1–0	2–2 (2OT)	–	0–4	1–0	–	1–2 (2OT)	0–1	–	0–0 (2OT)	2–2 (2OT)	–
vs. Notre Dame	1–4	1–2 (2OT)	0–1 (OT)	–	0–3	0–5	1–2	2–1 (2OT)	–	–	0–4	2–1	–	0–2
vs. Pittsburgh	0–3	2–0	5–0	5–0	–	0–2	0–2	1–0	–	–	2–4	–	2–1	2–1
vs. Syracuse	–	8–0	2–0	5–0	2–1	–	3–0	–	4–0	4–2	–	5–0	2–1	2–0
vs. Virginia	0–3	–	0–1	1–1 (2OT)	1–4	1–6	1–2	0–0 (2OT)	1–2	–	0–5	–	–	0–1
vs. Virginia Tech	0–1	1–0	1–1 (2OT)	2–0	–	0–5	0–1	2–2 (2OT)	–	1–2	1–2	–	–	4–3
vs. Wake Forest	0–1	–	2–0	–	2–1 (OT)	1–2 (2OT)	0–1	–	2–0	1–2	0–2	1–0	3–4	–
Total	1–9–0	6–3–1	7–2–1	7–1–2	3–6–1	1–9–0	4–6–0	5–2–3	7–3–0	4–6–0	0–10–0	8–0–2	5–3–2	6–4–0

=== Rankings ===
==== United Soccer ====
Legend
Increase in ranking
Decrease in ranking
Not ranked previous week

	Pre	Wk 1	Wk 2	Wk 3	Wk 4	Wk 5	Wk 6	Wk 7	Wk 8	Wk 9	Wk 10	Wk 11	Wk 12	Final
Boston College			RV											
Clemson	7	9	15	RV	RV	22	RV	RV	RV	RV	RV	24	RV	RV
Duke	6	5	5	5	4	2	4	4 (1)	8	6	2 (2)	6	4	5
Florida State	1 (11)	1 (26)	1 (32)	1 (29)	1 (32)	1 (33)	1 (33)	1 (29)	1 (31)	1 (31)	3 (5)	2 (2)	1 (29)	1 (25)
Louisville														
Miami														
North Carolina	3 (3)	2 (4)	2 (1)	2 (2)	2 (1)	4	5	5	3	7	7	7	10	14
NC State										RV				
Notre Dame			RV	RV	RV	RV	RV	24	17	15	22	RV	RV	16
Pittsburgh		RV	20	20	19	RV								
Syracuse														
Virginia	4 (1)	3 (1)	3	3 (1)	7	7	2 (1)	2 (1)	2 (1)	2 (2)	1 (26)	1 (28)	2 (3)	8
Virginia Tech		RV			RV	RV	19	17	RV	RV	RV	RV	RV	RV
Wake Forest							RV			RV	RV	25	RV	25

==== Top Drawer Soccer ====
Legend
Increase in ranking
Decrease in ranking
Not ranked previous week

	Wk 1	Wk 2	Wk 3	Wk 4	Wk 5	Wk 6	Wk 7	Wk 8	Wk 9	Wk 10	Wk 11	Wk 12	Wk 13	Wk 14	Wk 15	Wk 16	Final
Boston College																	
Clemson	8	7	10	23	21	16	18										
Duke	7	6	6	5	4	3	6	6	12	10	8	11	12	9	4	6	6
Florida State	2	2	1	1	1	1	1	1	1	1	2	2	1	1	1	1	1
Louisville																	
Miami																	
North Carolina	4	4	3	3	2	4	4	4	3	6	5	4	4	14	16	16	17
NC State																	
Notre Dame					24	22	20	15	13	14	17	25	23	20	22	22	15
Pittsburgh		23	21	22	20												
Syracuse																	
Virginia	3	3	2	2	7	5	2	2	2	2	1	1	3	2	9	9	9
Virginia Tech								25									
Wake Forest									23								

=== Players of the Week ===
Week	Offensive Player of the week	Defensive Player of the week	Reference
Week 1 – August 24	Amanda West, Pittsburgh	Jaelin Howell, Florida State	
Week 2 – August 31	Linda Boama, Boston College	Claudia Dickey, North Carolina	
Week 3 – September 7	Shayla Smart, Wake Forest	Claire Constant, Virginia	
Week 4 – September 14	Megan Bornkamp, Clemson	Emily Madril, Florida State	
Week 5 – September 21	Tess Boade, Duke	Ruthie Jones, Duke	
Week 6 – September 28	Sammi Fisher, Notre Dame	Emily Madril, Florida State (2)	
Week 6 – September 28	Diana Ordoñez, Virginia	Alia Skinner, Virginia Tech	
Week 7 – October 5	Beata Olsson, Florida State	Melissa Dagenais, Miami (FL)	
Week 7 – October 5	Emily Gray, Virginia Tech	Avery Patterson, North Carolina	
Week 8 – October 12	Jameese Joseph, NC State	Eva Gaetino, Notre Dame	
Week 9 – October 19	Jameese Joseph, NC State	Maria Echezarreta, NC State	
Week 9 – October 19	Alexa Spaanstra, Virginia	Maria Echezarreta, NC State	
Week 10 – October 26	Tess Boade, Duke (2)	Emily Royson, Duke	
Week 10 – October 26	Diana Ordoñez, Virginia (2)	Emily Royson, Duke	
Week 11 – November 2	Caroline Conti, Clemson	Ashley Naylor, Notre Dame	

== Postseason ==
=== ACC Tournament ===
Semifinals
1	Virginia	1
5	Clemson	0
2	Florida State	2^{OT}
6	Wake Forest	1

Final
1	Virginia	0
2	Florida State	1

=== NCAA tournament ===
Seed	School	Region	1st Round	2nd Round	3rd Round	Quarterfinals	Semifinals	Championship
1	Florida State	Florida State	W 3–0 vs. South Alabama – (Tallahassee, FL)	W 5–1 vs. No. 25 SMU – (Tallahassee, FL)	W 1–0 vs. No. 19 Pepperdine – (Tallahassee, FL)	W 1–0 (OT) vs. No. 9 Michigan – (Tallahassee, FL)	W 1–0 vs. No. 5 Rutgers – (Santa Clara, CA)	T 0–0 (4–3 PKs) vs. No. 13 BYU – (Santa Clara, CA)
1	Duke	Duke	W 1–0 vs. Old Dominion – (Durham, NC)	W 1–0 vs. No. 18 Memphis – (Durham, NC)	W 7–1 vs. St. John's – (Durham, NC)	L 1–2 vs. No. 12 Santa Clara – (Durham, NC)		
1	Virginia	Virginia	W 6–0 vs. High Point – (Charlottesville, VA)	W 2–0 vs. Milwaukee – (Charlottesville, VA)	L 0–1 vs. No. 13 BYU – (Charlottesville, VA)			
2	North Carolina	Virginia	L 0–1 vs. South Carolina – (Chapel Hill, NC)					
3	Notre Dame	Rutgers	W 3–0 vs. SIU Edwardsville – (Notre Dame, IN)	T 0–0 (4–3 PKs) at No. 24 Purdue – (Fayetteville, AR)	L 2–3 at No. 7 Arkansas – (Fayetteville, AR)			
	Clemson	Virginia	L 0–1 vs. Alabama – (Clemson, SC)					
	NC State	Florida State	W 2–0 at South Florida – (Tampa, FL)	L 0–3 vs. No. 19 Pepperdine – (Tallahassee, FL)				
	Virginia Tech	Rutgers	W 3–0 vs. Ohio State – (Blacksburg, VA)	L 0–3 at No. 7 Arkansas – (Fayetteville, AR)				
	Wake Forest	Florida State	W 3–0 vs. Harvard – (Winston-Salem, NC)	L 0–2 vs. No. 9 Michigan – (Ann Arbor, MI)				
W–L (%):			7–2–0 (.778)	3–3–1 (.500)	2–2–0 (.500)	1–1–0 (.500)	1–0–0 (1.000)	0–0–1 (.500) Total: 14–8–2 (.625)

== Awards and honors ==
=== ACC Awards ===
2021 ACC Women's Soccer Individual Awards
Award	Recipient(s)
Offensive Player of the Year	Diana Ordoñez – Virginia
Coach of the Year	Steve Swanson – Virginia
Defensive Player of the Year	Emily Madril – Florida State
Midfielder of the Year	Jaelin Howell – Florida State
Freshman of the Year	Michelle Cooper – Duke

2021 ACC Women's Soccer All-Conference Teams
First Team	Second Team	Third Team	All-Freshman Team
Megan Bornkamp – Clemson; Michelle Cooper – Duke; Tess Boade – Duke; Ruthie Jones – Duke; Jaelin Howell – Florida State; Emily Madril – Florida State; Yujie Zhao – Florida State; Maycee Bell – North Carolina; Sammi Fisher – Notre Dame; Lia Godfrey – Virginia; Diana Ordoñez – Virginia	Hal Hershfelt – Clemson; Sophie Jones – Duke; Gabby Carle – Florida State; Beata Olsson – Florida State; Clara Robbins – Florida State; Sam Meza – North Carolina; Jameese Joseph – NC State; Samar Guidry – Virginia; Laurel Ivory – Virginia; Alexa Spaanstra – Virginia; Emily Gray – Virginia Tech	Renée Guion – Clemson; Hensley Hancuff – Clemson; Makenna Morris – Clemson; Jody Brown – Florida State; Claudia Dickey – North Carolina; Lulu Guttenberger – NC State; Korbin Albert – Notre Dame; Olivia Wingate – Notre Dame; Amanda West – Pittsburgh; Haley Hopkins – Virginia; Taryn Torres – Virginia; Shayla Smart – Wake Forest	Renee Lyles – Clemson; Michelle Cooper – Duke; Maria Alagoa – Florida State; Mia Justus – Florida State; Nina Nicosia – Louisville; Emily Colton – North Carolina; Emily Murphy – North Carolina; Emika Kawagishi – NC State; Annika Wohner – NC State; Korbin Albert – Notre Dame; Nikayla Small – Wake Forest

== 2022 NWSL Draft ==
FW	Forward	MF	Midfielder	DF	Defender	GK	Goalkeeper

Player	Team	Round	Pick #	Position	School
Jaelin Howell	Racing Louisville FC	1	2	MF	Florida State
Emily Gray	North Carolina Courage	1	3	MF	Virginia Tech
Diana Ordoñez	North Carolina Courage	1	6	FW	Virginia
Caitlin Cosme	Orlando Pride	1	10	DF	Duke
Sammi Fisher	Chicago Red Stars	2	19	MF	Notre Dame
Claudia Dickey	OL Reign	2	20	GK	North Carolina
Ryanne Brown	OL Reign	2	21	DF	Wake Forest
Jenna Menta	Racing Louisville FC	3	30	FW	Wake Forest
Hensley Hancuff	NJ/NY Gotham FC	3	34	GK	Clemson
Lily Nabet	Angel City FC	3	36	MF	Duke
