= Cluff =

Cluff may refer to:

== People ==
- Benjamin Cluff (1858–1948), first president of Brigham Young University
- Daniel Webster Cluff (1916–1989), United States Coast Guard officer
- Flo Cluff, Australian trade unionist, communist and pensioner activist
- Harvey H. Cluff (1836–1916), American business, civic and educational leader in Provo, Utah
- Harvey H. Cluff (politician), American politician
- Mikayla Cluff (born 1999), American soccer player
- Oscar Cluff (born 2001), Australian basketball player
- Pamela Cluff, British-born Canadian architect
- Rick Cluff (1950–2024), Canadian journalist
- Wendy Cluff, American gymnast
- William W. Cluff, American Latter-day Saint missionary and leader, politician

== Places ==
- Cluff Apartments, a historic building in Salt Lake City, Utah, United States
- Cluff Cienega, a former name of McNary, Arizona, United States
- Cluff Lake mine, Saskatchewan, Canada
- Cluff Ranch Ponds, Pinaleño Mountains, Arizona, United States
- Harvey H. Cluff House, Provo, Utah, United States

== Other uses ==
- Cluff (TV series), British detective television series
- Cluff–Foster–Idelson code

== See also ==
- Clough (disambiguation)
