= 2018 NCAA Division I women's soccer championship game =

2019 NCAA Division I women's soccer championship game
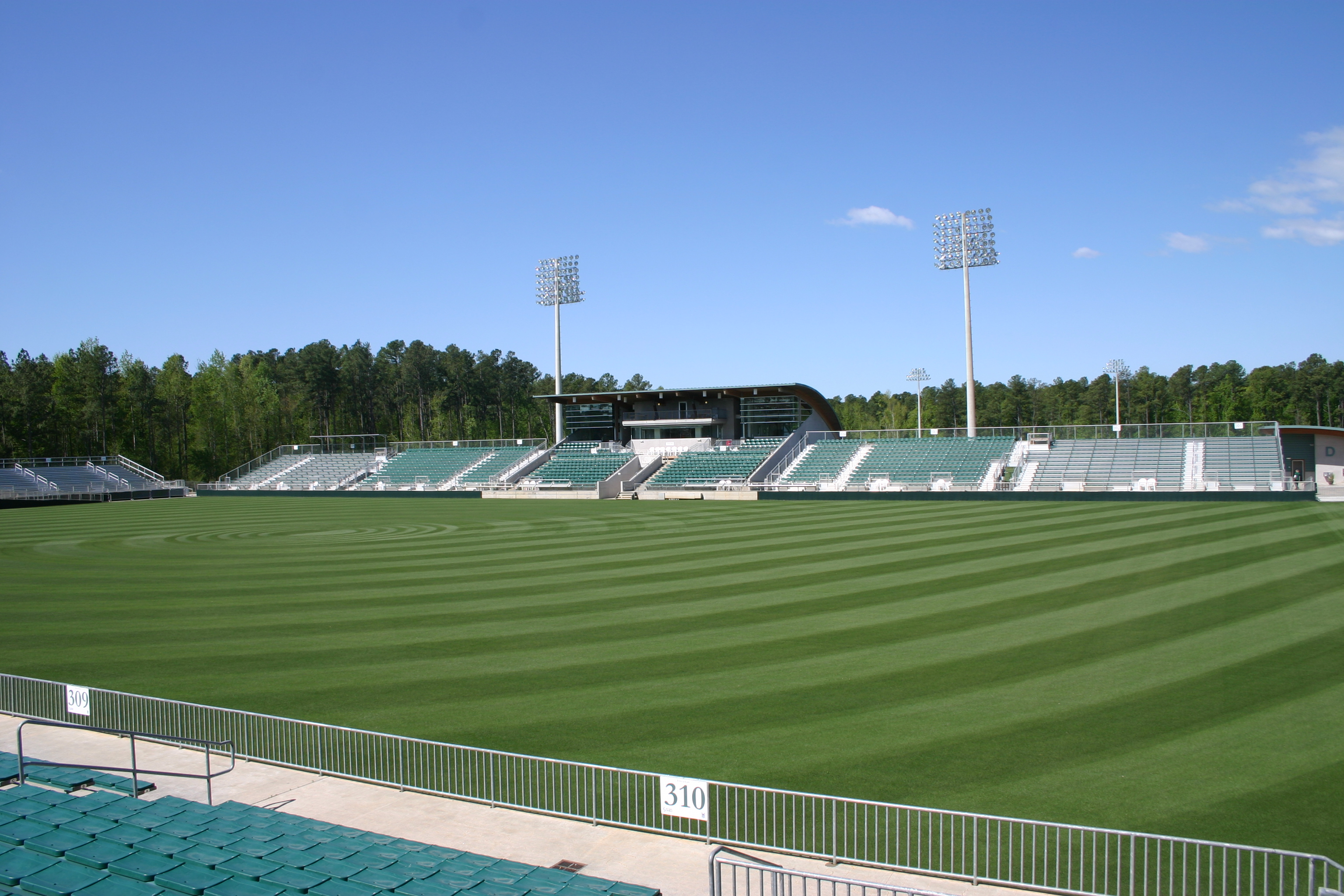
- WakeMed Soccer Park hosted the match
- Event: 2018 NCAA Division I women's soccer tournament
Florida State	North Carolina
ACC	ACC
1	0
- Date: December 2, 2018
- Venue: WakeMed Soccer Park, Cary, NC
- Referee: Lance VanHaitsma
- Attendance: 12,512

The 2018 NCAA Division I women's soccer championship game (also known as the 2018 NCAA Division I Women's College Cup) was played on December 8, 2018, at WakeMed Soccer Park in Cary, North Carolina, and determined the winner of the 2018 NCAA Division I women's soccer tournament, the national collegiate women's soccer championship in the United States. This was the 37th. edition of this tournament organised by the NCAA.

The match featured Florida State (20–4–3), which played its 4th. final, and University of North Carolina (21–4–2), which made its 25th. appearance in the final. Florida State defeated North Carolina 1–0 to win its second NCAA women's soccer title, with a goal scored by Dallas Dorosy in the 60th minute after an assistance by Deyna Castellanos.

== Road to the final ==
The NCAA Division I women's soccer tournament, sometimes known as the College Cup, is an American intercollegiate soccer tournament conducted by the National Collegiate Athletic Association (NCAA), and determines the Division I women's national champion. The tournament has been formally held since 1982, when it was a twelve-team tournament.

Florida State (ACC)		Round	North Carolina (ACC)	
Opponent	Result	NCAA Tournament	Opponent	Result
Loyola (A10)	1–0 (H)	First round	Howard (MEAC)	4–0 (H)
South Florida (AAC)	3–1 (H)	Second round	Kansas (Big 12)	4–1 (H)
USC (Pac-12)	1–1 (5–4 p) (H)	Round of 16	Virginia Tech (ACC)	3–0 (H)
Penn State (Big Ten)	1–0 (H)	Quarterfinal	UCLA (Pac-12)	2–2 (4–2 p) (A)
Stanford (Pac-12)	2–0 (N)	Semifinal	Georgetown (Big East)	1–0 (a.e.t.) (N)

== Match details ==
December 2, 2018

Florida State	1–0	North Carolina
Dorossy 60'	Report 1 Report 2

WakeMed Soccer Park, Cary, NC
Attendance: 12,512
Referee: Lance VanHaitsma

Florida State
North Carolina

GK	0	(United States) Caroline Jeffers
DF	16	(Canada) Gabrielle Carle
DF	17	(United States) Malia Berkely
DF	14	(Finland) Natalia Kuikka
DF	9	(United States) Kirsten Pavlisko
MF	33	(China) Zhao Yujie
MF	6	(United States) Jaelin Howell		(substituted off) 54'
MF	10	(Venezuela) Deyna Castellanos		(substituted off) 31'
FW	12	(United States) Kaycie Tillman		(substituted off) 35'
FW	20	(United States) Kristen McFarland		(substituted off) 20'
FW	11	(Costa Rica) Gloriana Villalobos		(substituted off) 35'
Substitutions:
MF	7	(United States) Dallas Dorosy		(substituted on) 20'
DF	5	(England) Anna Patten	(yellow card) 84'	(substituted on) 31' (substituted off) 54'
MF	3	(Republic of Ireland) Megan Connolly		(substituted on) 35'
DF	15	(United States) Olivia Bergau		(substituted on) 35'
Manager:
(United States) Mark Krikorian

GK	13	(United States) Samantha Leshnak
DF	16	(United States) Julia Ashley
DF	23	(England) Lotte Wubben-Moy
DF	30	(United States) Brooke Bingham
DF	11	(United States) Emily Fox	(substituted off) 35' (substituted off) 74' (substituted on) 82'
MF	8	(United States) Brianna Pinto	(substituted off) 55' (substituted on) 63'
MF	6	(United States) Taylor Otto	(substituted off) 63' (substituted on) 74'
MF	29	(United States) Dorian Bailey	(substituted off) 29'
FW	4	(United States) Bridgette Andrzejewski	(substituted off) 24' (substituted off) 55' (substituted on) 69' (substituted off) 82'
FW	47	(Peru) Alex Kimball	(substituted off) 23' (substituted off) 58' (substituted on) 69'
FW	1	(United States) Madison Schultz	(substituted off) 19' (substituted off) 58' (substituted on) 69' (substituted on) 82'
Substitutions:
FW	10	(United States) Rachel Jones	(substituted on) 19' (substituted off) 41' (substituted on) 55' (substituted off) 69' (substituted on) 82'
FW	9	(United States) Rachael Dorwart	(substituted on) 23' (substituted off) 58' (substituted on) 69'
FW	3	(Zimbabwe) Ru Mucherera	(substituted on) 24' (substituted on) 58' (substituted off) 69' (substituted on) 82'
MF	7	(United States) Annie Kingman	(substituted on) 29' (substituted on) 55' (substituted off) 74'
DF	14	(United States) Morgan Goff	(substituted on) 35' (substituted on) 74' (substituted off) 82'
FW	2	(United States) Sydney Spruill	(substituted on) 41'
Manager:
(United States) Anson Dorrance

College Cup MVP
Offensive:
Defensive:

Assistant referees:
Jude Carr (United States)
Maggie Short (United States)
Fourth official:
Becky Pagan (United States)

Match rules:

- 90 minutes.
- 20 minutes of extra time if necessary.
- Penalty shoot-out if scores still level.
- Unlimited substitutes, may not return if subbed out in the first half; may return unlimited times in the second half.

=== Statistics ===
Overall
	Florida State	North Carolina
Goals scored	0	0
Total shots	8	8
Saves	2	2
Corner kicks	1	5
Offsides	0	5
Yellow cards	1	0
Red cards	0	0
