= 2021 BYU Cougars women's soccer team =

American college soccer season

2021 BYU Cougars women's soccer

Co-WCC Champions

2021 NCAA Division I women's soccer tournament, Runner–Up
- Conference: West Coast Conference

Ranking
- Coaches: No. 2
- Record: 17–4–3 (8–1–0 WCC)
- Head coach: Jennifer Rockwood (27th season)
- Home stadium: South Field

Uniform
Home	Away

2021 West Coast Conference women's soccer standings
	Conf.						Overall
Team	W		L		T	PCT	W		L		T	PCT
No. 2 BYU ‍†‍‍^{y}	8	–	1	–	0	.889	17	–	4	–	3	.771
No. 4 Santa Clara ‍†‍‍^{y}	8	–	1	–	0	.889	15	–	5	–	3	.717
No. 13 Pepperdine ‍‍‍^{y}	6	–	2	–	1	.722	17	–	4	–	1	.795
Gonzaga ‍‍‍	5	–	4	–	0	.556	15	–	5	–	0	.750
Saint Mary's ‍‍‍	4	–	3	–	2	.556	10	–	4	–	4	.667
Portland ‍‍‍	4	–	4	–	0	.500	8	–	8	–	0	.500
Pacific ‍‍‍	2	–	4	–	2	.375	10	–	5	–	3	.639
San Francisco ‍‍‍	2	–	6	–	0	.250	6	–	9	–	2	.412
San Diego ‍‍‍	1	–	6	–	1	.188	6	–	10	–	1	.382
Loyola Marymount ‍‍‍	0	–	9	–	0	.000	0	–	19	–	0	.000
† – Conference champion y – Invited to the NCAA tournament As of December 7, 2021; Rankings from United Soccer Coaches Poll; Source:West Coast Conference

The 2021 BYU Cougars women's soccer team represented Brigham Young University during the 2021 NCAA Division I women's soccer season. The Cougars were coached for a 27th consecutive season by Jennifer Rockwood, who was co-coach in 1995 and became the solo head coach in 1996. Before 1995 BYU women's soccer competed as a club team and not as a member of the NCAA. Overall the Cougars have made the NCAA tournament in 21 of the 26 seasons that Rockwood has been the head coach. Joining Rockwood as assistant coaches are Brent Anderson (5th season) and Steve Magleby (4th season) with volunteer assistants Rachel Jorgensen (7th season) and McKinzie Young (9th season). The Cougars come off of a season where they were second in the WCC and went 11–4–1, 7–1–1 in the WCC. Their lone conference loss came to eventual national champion Santa Clara, whom the Cougars beat in Santa Clara in a non-conference match. For the 2021 season BYU returned 10 starters, including defending WCC Offensive Player of the Year Mikayla Colohan, who was drafted by the Orlando Pride. Cameron Tucker, who recorded eight goals and eight assists in 2020–21, also returned. The others returning due to an extra year of eligibility granted due to the COVID-19 pandemic include goalkeeper Cassidy Smith, Grace Johnson and Mikaylie Call. The incoming class features six new athletes and no new transfers. The Cougars went on to share the WCC crown, advance to their first ever College Cup, and tied in the championship with Florida State before losing on penalties to finish as national runner–up.

== Personnel ==
=== Roster ===
No.	Position	Player	Height	Hometown	Year
1	GK	Haven Empey	5'9"	American Fork, UT	Freshman
2	MF, D	Olivia Smith	5'6"	Eagle, ID	RS Freshman
3	MF, F	Makaylie Moore	5'5"	Auburn, WA	Senior
4	D	Grace Johnson	5'10"	Centerville, UT	Senior
5	F, MF	Brecken Mozingo	5'6"	Sandy, UT	Sophomore
6	MF	Ashton Johnson	5'10"	Provo, UT	Junior
7	D	Brooke Hale	5'10"	Danville, CA	Freshman
8	MF	Mikayla Colohan	5'8"	Fruit Heights, UT	Senior
10	MF, F	Olivia Wade	5'8"	Kaysville, UT	Sophomore
11	MF, F	Ellie Maughan	5'8"	North Ogden, UT	Sophomore
12	MF	Jamie Shepherd	5'7"	American Fork, UT	Sophomore
13	F, MF	Lytiana Akinaka	5'6"	Maui, HI	Junior
15	D	Zoe Jacobs	5'5"	Kaysville, UT	Sophomore
16	MF, D	Kendell Petersen	5'8"	South Weber, UT	Sophomore
18	F, MF	Paola Garcia	5'3"	Mapleton, UT	Freshman
19	F	Addie Gardner	5'7"	Highland, UT	Freshman
20	F	Cameron Tucker	5'9"	Highland, UT	Senior
21	D	Tara Warner	5'6"	Springville, UT	Freshman
22	F, MF	Bella Folino	5'6"	Aliso Viejo, CA	RS Sophomore
23	F	Ruby Hladek	5'7"	Ladera Ranch, CA	Freshman
24	MF	Josie Shepherd	5'6"	American Fork, UT	Freshman
25	MF, F	Jacey Wood	5'6"	Las Vegas, NV	Freshman
26	D	Laveni Vaka	5'6"	Sandy, UT	Sophomore
27	F	Daviana Vaka	5'7"	Sandy, UT	RS Freshman
28	D	Natalee Wells	5'7"	Alpine, UT	Junior
29	MF, D	Abbie Kotter	5'9"	Providence, UT	Freshman
32	GK	Cassidy Smith	5'9"	Alpine, UT	RS Senior
33	MF, F	Rachel McCarthy	5'7"	American Fork, UT	Sophomore
34	GK	Kelsey Hoopes	5'7"	Livermore, CA	Freshman
66	GK	Savanna Empey	5'10"	American Fork, UT	Freshman

== Media ==
=== Television & Internet Streaming ===
Most BYU women's soccer will have a TV broadcast or internet video stream available. BYUtv and WCC Network will once again serve as the primary providers. Information on these television and streaming broadcasts can be found under each individual match.

=== Nu Skin BYU Sports Network ===
For an eighth consecutive season the BYU Sports Network will air BYU Cougars women's soccer games. Greg Wrubell will provide play-by-play for most games with Jason Shepherd filling-in when Wrubell has football or basketball duties. BYU Radio's KUMT station 107.9 FM will act as the flagship stations for women's soccer, though the BYU Sports App will carry a few games exclusively. For the national semifinal and championship SiriusXM's BYU Radio 143 station was added to provide a nationwide broadcast.

Affiliates

- BYU Radio- KUMT 107.9 FM

== Schedule and results ==
2021 BYU Cougars women's soccer Game Log
Legend: = Win = Loss = Tie = Canceled Bold = BYU team member
Regular season (13–4–1)

August (2–2–0)
Date	Time (MT)	TV	Opponent	Rank	Stadium	Score	Goal Scorers	Attendance	Referees	Overall record	WCC Record	Box Score	Recap
August 14	7:00 PM	BYUtv	Weber State* (Exhibition)	No. 15	South Field • Provo, UT	**W 5–0**	**Olivia Wade** 1'; **Cameron Tucker** 3'; **Bella Folino** 54', 55'; **Ashton Johnson** 78'	1,938	Sly Yates, Mike Anglin, Mitch Lilywhite	—	—	Box score	Recap
August 19	7:00 PM	BYUtv	Ohio State*	No. 15	South Field • Provo, UT	**W 3–0**	**Mikayla Colohan** 6', 40' (yellow card) 20' Marissa Birzon; (yellow card) 34' Emaly Vatne; **Ellie Maughan** 80'; **Ellie Maughan** (yellow card) 88'	1,632	Allen Pickett, Skylar Pack, Blake Griffiths	1–0–0	—	Box score	Recap
August 21	5:30 PM	SEC+	@ Auburn*	No. 15	Auburn Soccer Complex • Auburn AL	**L 1–2**	**Olivia Smith** (yellow card) 31'; 42', 68' Anna Haddock; **Abbie Kotter** 42'; (yellow card) 66' Mallory Mooney	928	Jesus Hernandez-Balbas, Katarzyna Wasiak, Kevin Huet	1–1–0	—	Box score	Recap
August 26	8:00 PM	BYUtv	No. 25 USC*	No. 24	South Field • Provo, UT	**W 2–1**	**Brecken Mozingo** 13'; **Bella Folino** 40'; **Olivia Smith** (yellow card) 69'; **Natalee Wells** (yellow card) 71'; 84' Bethune Croix; **Olivia Wade** (yellow card) 88'	5,347	Schuyler Pack, Max Thomas, Robbie Kosinski	2–1–0	—	Box score	Recap
August 30	6:00 PM	SEC+	@ Arkansas*	No. 24	Razorback Field • Fayetteville, AR	**L 0–2**	4', 54' Anna Podojil; (yellow card) 36' Kiley Dulaney; **Ellie Maughan** (yellow card) 80'	2,370	Jonathan Weiner, Rachel Cap, Matt Trotter	2–2–0	—	Box score	Recap

September (3–1–1)
Date	Time (MT)	TV	Opponent	Rank	Stadium	Score	Goal Scorers	Attendance	Referees	Overall record	WCC Record	Box Score	Recap
September 2	7:00 PM	BYUtv.org	Marquette*	No. 14	South Field • Provo, UT	**W 7–0**	**Olivia Wade** 11'; **Bella Folino** 21'; **Mikayla Colohan** 34'; **Cameron Tucker** 57'; **Brecken Mozingo** 62'; Elsi Twombly (yellow card) 64'; **Paola Garcia** (yellow card) 66'; Hailey Block (yellow card) 78'; **Caroline Stringfellow** 79'; **Addie Gardner** 84'	1,807	Omeed Azadpour, Scheyler Pack, Michael Anglin	3–2–0	—	Box score	Recap
September 9	6:00 PM	P12N	@ Utah* (Deseret First Duel)	No. 22	Ute Field • Salt Lake City, UT	**T 0–0**	Kylee Geis (yellow card) 80'; **Laveni Vaka** (yellow card) 83'	2,544	Sean Wright, Allen Pickett, Schuyler Pack	3–2–1	—	Box score	Recap
September 11	6:00 PM	BYUtv.org	Missouri*	No. 22	South Field • Provo, UT	**W 7–4**	**Cameron Tucker** 16', 53'; **Abbie Cotter** 31', 72'; **Ellie Maughan** 40'; Leah Selm (yellow card) 41'; Ashlyn Mills (yellow card) 60'; Blythe Beldner (yellow card) 64'; Milena Fischer 73', 83'; **Makaylie Moore** 74'; Skye Kingsley 80'; **Rachel McCarthy** 81'; Jenna Bartels 86'; **Rachel McCarthy** (yellow card) 87'	1,777	Hamed Sadeghi, Robert Kosinski, Allen Pickett	4–2–1	—	Box score	Recap
September 16	7:00 PM	BYUtv.org	Idaho State*	No. 18	South Field • Provo, UT	**W 7–0**	**Mikayla Colohan** 7', 22', 74'; **Cameron Tucker** 11'; **Bella Folino** 13'; **Brecken Mozingo** 14'; **Ashton Johnson** 67'	1,537	Michael Anglin, Bennett Savage, Allen Jimenez	5–2–1	—	Box score	Recap
September 18	6:00 PM	BYUtv.org	Utah State*	No. 18	South Field • Provo, UT	**L 1–2**	Addy Symonds (yellow card) 13'; Ashley Cardozzo 24'; Tenzi Knowles (yellow card) 39'; Sammie Murdock (yellow card) 48'; **Laveni Vaka** (yellow card) 48'; **Mikayla Colohan** 57'; **Jamie Shepherd** (yellow card) 66'; Tenzi Knowles 99'	2,715	Sly Yeates, Nathan Boone, Daniel Spicer-Escalante	5–3–1	—	Box score	Recap

October (6–1–0)
Date	Time (MT)	TV	Opponent	Rank	Stadium	Score	Goal Scorers	Attendance	Referees	Overall record	WCC Record	Box Score	Recap
October 2	8:00 PM	WCC Network	@ No. 16 Gonzaga	–	Luger Field • Spokane, WA	W 6–1	**Brecken Mozingo** 7', 13'; **Bella Folino** 11'; **Cameron Tucker** 14'; **Rachel McCarthy** 32'; Haley Archuleta 45'; **Rachel McCarthy** (yellow card) 52'; **Mikayla Colohan** 56'; **Cameron Tucker** (yellow card) 73'	840	Saaed Askar, Elorm Atisu, Brett Danielson	6–3–1	1–0–0	Box score	Recap
October 6	7:00 PM	BYUtv.org	Saint Mary's	No. 20	South Field • Provo, UT	W 7–0	**Cameron Tucker** 21', 31', 56', 62'; **Olivia Smith** 42'; **Ellie Maughan** 81'; **Caroline Stringfellow** 90'	2,273	TJ Zablocki, Alan Jimenez, Kyle Douglas	7–3–1	2–0–0	Box score	Recap
October 9	6:00 PM	BYUtv.org	San Diego	No. 20	South Field • Provo, UT	W 6–0	**BYU Team Goal** 12'; **Makaylie Moore** 19'; **Mikayla Colohan** 49', 79'; **Kendell Peterson** (yellow card) 82'; **Addie Gardner** 82'; **Paola Garcia** 86'	1,358	Schuyler Pack, Nathan Boone, Bennett Savage	8–3–1	3–0–0	Box score	Recap
October 16	7:00 PM	BYUtv.org	Pacific	No. 15	South Field • Provo, UT	W 6–1	**Mikayla Colohan** 15'; **Cameron Tucker** 17', 44'; Kelsey Oen (yellow card) 36'; **Grace Johnson** 37'; **Rachel McCarthy** 41'; Hunter More 49'; **Bella Folino** 65'	2,139	Omeed Azadpour, Allen Pickett, Casey Harward	9–3–1	4–0–0	Box score	Recap
October 20	8:00 PM	WCC Network	@ San Francisco	No. 12	Negoesco Stadium • San Francisco, CA	W 3–1	**Bella Folino** 4'; **Mikayla Colohan** 35'; **Cameron Tucker** 46'; Marissa Vasquez 46'; **Laveni Vaka** (yellow card) 88'	477	Peter Hanson, Sarah Cortez, Dwight Maloney III	10–3–1	5–0–0	Box score	Recap
October 23	7:00 PM	BYUtv.org	Loyola Marymount	No. 12	South Field • Provo, UT	W 2–0	**Bella Folino** 1'; Skylar Robledo (yellow card) 45'; Kendyll Humphreys (yellow card) 69'; **Mikayla Colohan** 69' (pen.)	1,447	Hamed Sadeghi, Allen Pickett, Marcelo Chaparro	11–3–1	6–0–0	Box score	Recap
October 30	2:00 PM	WCC Network	@ No. 25 Santa Clara	No. 11	Stevens Stadium • Santa Clara, CA	L 0–1	**Rachel McCarthy** (yellow card) 74'; Kelsey Turnbow 74'	737	Saul Espinoza, Jorge Ruiz, Brandon Chapman	11–4–1	6–1–0	Box score	Recap

November (2–0–0)
Date	Time (MT)	TV	Opponent	Rank	Stadium	Score	Goal Scorers	Attendance	Referees	Overall record	WCC Record	Box Score	Recap
November 3	8:00 PM	WCC Network	@ Portland	No. 12	Merlo Field • Portland, OR	**W 3–0**	**Rachel McCarthy** 32'; Ellie Walker (yellow card) 37'; **Bella Folino** 54', 57'	1,018	Justin St. Pierre, Ian Miller, Bryan Juarez	12–4–1	7–1–0	Box score	Recap
November 6	6:00 PM	BYUtv.org	No. 16 Pepperdine	No. 12	South Field • Provo, UT	**W 1–0**	Devyn Gilfoy (yellow card) 72'; **Mikayla Colohan** (yellow card) 99'; Carlee Giammona (yellow card) 104'; **Cameron Tucker** 104'	3,762	Adrian Gonzalez, Bennett Savage, Sly Yeates	13–4–1	8–1–0	Box score	Recap

Postseason (4–0–2)

NCAA tournament
Date	Time (MT)	TV	Opponent	Seed	Stadium	Score	Goal Scorers	Attendance	Referees	Overall record	Tournament record	Box Score	Recap
November 13	7:00 PM	BYUtv	New Mexico*	No. 13 ^{(4-seed)}	South Field • Provo, UT	**W 6–0**	(yellow card) 35' Isais Myah; **Cameron Tucker** 36'; **Brecken Mozingo** 53', 55'; **Jamie Shepherd** 64'; **Own Goal** 69' (o.g.); **Ellie Maughan** 71'	2,745	Younes Marrakchi, Hao Guo, Jordan Downs	14–4–1	–	Box score	Recap
November 18	2:00 PM	ESPN+	vs. Alabama*	No. 13 ^{(4-seed)}	Klöckner Stadium • Charlottesville, VA	**W 4–1**	(yellow card) 3' Reyna Reyes; **Cameron Tucker** 4'; **Mikayla Colohan** 20' (pen.); **Kendell Petersen** (yellow card) 44'; **Brecken Mozingo** (yellow card) 48'; (yellow card) 48' Gessica Skorka; 65' Felicia Knox; (yellow card) 85' Sasha Pickard	0	Lucas Feathers, Bill Dittmar, Robert Velbis	15–4–1	–	Box score	Recap
November 20	5:00 PM	ACCNX	@ No. 2 ^{(1-seed)} Virginia*	No. 13 ^{(4-seed)}	Klöckner Stadium • Charlottesville, VA	**W 1–0**	**Mikayla Colohan'** (yellow card) 33'; **Cameron Tucker** 47'; **Rachel McCarthy** (yellow card) 82'; **Cameron Tucker** (yellow card) 88'	0	Karl Kummer, Raymond Thomas, Ryan Graves	16–4–1	–	Box score	Recap
November 27	5:00 PM	BYUtv	South Carolina*	No. 13 ^{(4-seed)}	South Field • Provo, UT	**W 4–1**	**Makaylie Moore** 3', 61'; **Mikayla Colohan** 15', 47'; 40' Corinna Zullo; (yellow card) 71' Jyllissa Harris; **Makaylie Moore** (yellow card) 75'; (yellow card) 89' Remi Swartz	4,131	Brad Jensen, Karsten Gillwald, Jordan Downs	17–4–1	–	Box score	Recap
December 3	7:30 PM	ESPNU	vs. No. 12 Santa Clara*	No. 13 ^{(4-seed)}	Stevens Stadium • Santa Clara, CA	**T 0–0** ^{(Pen. 3–2)}	**Mikayla Colohan** (penalty missed); (penalty scored) Sally Ment; **Jamie Shepherd** (penalty missed); (penalty missed) Nicole Sweeney; **Brecken Mozingo** (penalty scored); (penalty missed) Kelsey Turnbow; **Bella Folino** (penalty scored); (penalty scored) Izzy D'Aquila; **Olivia Wade** (penalty scored); (penalty missed) Ellie Glenn	7,600	Tori Penso, Matt Rodman, Kate Wasiak	17–4–2	–	Box score	Recap
December 6	6:00 PM	ESPNU	vs. No. 1 ^{(1-seed)} Florida State*	No. 13 ^{(4-seed)}	Stevens Stadium • Santa Clara, CA	**T 0–0** ^{(Pen. 3–4)}	(yellow card) 32' Jaelin Howell; Mikayla Colohan (yellow card) 79'; **Mikayla Colohan** (penalty scored); (penalty scored) Clara Robbins; **Jamie Shepherd** (penalty missed); (penalty scored) Heather Payne; **Brecken Mozingo** (penalty scored); (penalty missed) Gabby Carle; **Bella Folino** (penalty missed); (penalty scored) Jaelin Howell; **Olivia Wade** (penalty scored); (penalty scored) Yujie Zhao	7,087	JC Griggs, Rachel Smith, Kristen Patterson	17–4–3	–	Box score	Recap

* indicates a non-conference game. All rankings from the United Soccer Coaches Poll on the date of the contest.

== Announcers ==
- Weber State: Spencer Linton, Carla Haslam, & Kiki Solano (BYUtv); Greg Wrubell (BYU Cougars Live Radio App)
- Ohio State: Jason Shepherd, Carla Haslam & Kiki Solano (BYUtv); Greg Wrubell & Rachel Jorgensen (BYU Radio)
- Auburn: JJ Jackson & Mackenzie Hamilton (SEC+); Greg Wrubell (BYU Radio)
- USC: Jason Shepherd, Carla Haslam & Kiki Solano (BYUtv); Greg Wrubell & Rachel Jorgensen (BYU Radio)
- Arkansas: Brett Dolan & Josh Haley (SEC+); Greg Wrubell & Rachel Jorgensen (BYU Radio)
- Marquette: Jason Shepherd & Landon Southwick (BYUtv.org); Greg Wrubell & Rachel Jorgensen (BYU Radio)
- Utah: Krista Blunk (P12); Greg Wrubell & Rachel Jorgensen (BYU Radio)
- Missouri: Jarom Jordan & Carla Haslam (BYUtv.org); Greg Wrubell & Rachel Jorgensen (BYU Radio)
- Idaho State: Spencer Linton & Avery Walker (BYUtv.org); Greg Wrubell & Rachel Jorgensen (BYU Radio)
- Utah State: Jarom Jordan & Landon Southwick (BYUtv.org); Jason Shepherd & Rachel Jorgensen (BYU Radio)
- Gonzaga: Nezar Awad & Sam Mohan Lewin (WCC Net); Greg Wrubell & Rachel Jorgensen (BYU Radio)
- Saint Mary's: Spencer Linton & Carla Haslam (BYUtv.org); Greg Wrubell & Rachel Jorgensen (BYU Radio)
- San Diego: Jarom Jordan & Carla Haslam (BYUtv.org); Jason Shepherd & Rachel Jorgensen (BYU Radio)
- Pacific: Landon Southwick & Carla Haslam (BYUtv.org); Jason Shepherd & Rachel Jorgensen (BYU Radio)
- San Francisco: Charles Wollin (WCC Net); Greg Wrubell & Rachel Jorgensen (BYU Radio)
- Loyola Marymount: Jarom Jordan & Carla Haslam (BYUtv.org); Jason Shepherd & Rachel Jorgensen (BYU Radio)
- Santa Clara: David Gentile (WCC Net); Jason Shepherd & Rachel Jorgensen (BYU Radio)
- Portland: Ann Schatz & Angela Harrison (WCC Net); Greg Wrubell & Rachel Jorgensen (BYU Radio)
- Pepperdine: Landon Southwick & Carla Haslam (BYUtv.org); Greg Wrubell & Rachel Jorgensen (BYU Radio)
- New Mexico: Spencer Linton, Carla Haslam, & Jason Shepherd (BYUtv); Greg Wrubell & Rachel Jorgensen (BYU Radio)
- Alabama: Jason Patterson (ESPN+); Greg Wrubell & Rachel Jorgensen (BYU Radio)
- Virginia: Jason Patterson & Paddy Foss (ACCNX); Jason Shepherd & Rachel Jorgensen (BYU Radio)
- South Carolina: Jarom Jordan, Carla Haslam, & Kiki Solano (BYUtv); Landon Southwick & Rachel Jorgensen (BYU Cougars Live Radio App)
- Santa Clara: Jenn Hildreth & Julie Foudy (ESPNU); Greg Wrubell & Rachel Jorgensen (BYU Radio)
- Florida State: Jenn Hildreth & Julie Foudy (ESPNU); Greg Wrubell & Rachel Jorgensen (BYU Radio)

== Rankings ==
Regular season Polls
Poll	Pre- Season	Week 1	Week 2	Week 3	Week 4	Week 5	Week 6	Week 7	Week 8	Week 9	Week 10	Week 11	Week 12 Postseason	Final
United Soccer Coaches	15	24	14	22	18	(RV)	(RV)	20	15	12	11	12	13	2
Top Drawer Soccer	12	15	12	20	18	NR	NR	NR	NR	24	19	19	17 ^{(1st Round)} 12 ^{(2nd Rd, Sweet 16)} 6 ^{(Elite 8)} 3 ^{(Final 4)}	2

Legend
	Increase in ranking
	Decrease in ranking
	Not ranked previous week
(RV)	Received Votes
