= Cleugh =

Cleugh may refer to:

- Eric Arthur Cleugh, British diplomat
- Helen Cleugh, New Zealand atmospheric scientist
- James Cleugh, English author and translator
- John Cleugh, English Anglican priest
- M. F. Cleugh, British philosopher and educationalist
- Cleugh Passage, a strait in the Andaman Islands, India

== See also ==
- Battle of Pinkie Cleugh, in Scotland
- Clough (disambiguation)
