= Samantha Fisher =

Samantha Fisher may refer to:

- Samantha Fisher (curler) (born 1995), Canadian curler
- Samantha Fisher (footballer) (born 1999), Salvadoran footballer
