= Clough (disambiguation) =

Clough can refer to the following:

== Places ==
- Clough, County Laois, Ireland, a village
- Clough, a village in County Down, Northern Ireland
- Clough, South Dakota, a ghost town
- Boggart Hole Clough, parkland in Manchester, England
- Clough Castle, a motte-and-bailey in the village of Clough, Northern Ireland
- Clough Dene, a village in County Durham, England
- Clough Hall, a suburb of Kidsgrove, Staffordshire, England
- Clough Head, a fell in England's Lake District
- Clough River, Cumbria, England
- Clough Undergraduate Learning Commons, a building of Georgia Institute of Technology, Georgia, United States

== People ==
=== First / middle name ===
- Clough Williams-Ellis
- John Clough Holmes
- Richard Clough Anderson, Jr.

=== Surname ===
- Anne Clough (1820–1892), British college principal and suffragist
- Arthur Hugh Clough (1819–1861), English poet
- Blanche Athena Clough (1861–1960), British college principal and classicist
- Brenda Clough (born 1955), American science fiction writer
- Brian Clough (1935–2004), English football player and manager
- Bryan Clough (1932– ), English writer
- Charles Sidney Clough (born 1951), American painter
- Charles Thomas Clough (1852–1916), British geologist and mapmaker
- David Marston Clough (1846–1924), American politician
- Dick Clough (1884–1915), Australian rules footballer
- Ebenezer Clough (died 1724), American stonemason
- Estelle Pinckney Clough (1866–1929), American soprano
- Ethlyn T. Clough (1858–1936), American newspaper publisher, editor
- Gareth Clough (1978–), English cricketer
- G. Wayne Clough (1941–), American engineer, Secretary of the Smithsonian Institution and former President of the Georgia Institute of Technology
- Ian Clough (1937–1970), British mountaineer
- Inez Clough (1873–1933), American singer, dancer, and actress of film and stage
- Jack Clough (referee), British football referee
- John Clough (rugby league) (1984– ), English rugby league player
- Joseph Messer Clough (1828–1919), American Union Civil War era brevet brigadier general
- Katy Clough, British physicist
- Nigel Clough (1966–), English footballer and manager (son of Brian Clough)
- Noel Clough (1937–2023), Australian track and field athlete
- Paul Clough (1987–), English rugby league player
- Peter Clough (1956–), Australian cricketer
- Prunella Clough (1919–1999), British artist
- Ray William Clough (1920–2016), Professor at UC Berkeley
- Richard Clough (c.1530–1570), Welsh merchant
- Sharyn Clough (1965–), American philosopher
- Tom Clough (1891–1964), English musician
- Zach Clough (1995–), English footballer

== Other ==
- Clough/Ballacolla, sports club
- Clough Harbour, a United States engineering firm
- Clough Group, an Australian engineering firm

== See also ==
- Clogh (disambiguation)
- Cluff
