= Clogh =

Clogh may refer to:

- Clogh, County Antrim, a village in County Antrim, Northern Ireland
- Clogh, County Wexford, a village in County Wexford, Ireland
- Clogh, County Kilkenny, a village in County Kilkenny, Ireland

== See also ==
- Clough (disambiguation)
