= 2021 NCAA Division I women's soccer tournament =

2021 NCAA women's soccer tournament
Women's College Cup (Semifinals & Final)

Tournament details
- Country: United States
- Dates: November 12 – December 7, 2021
- Teams: 64

Final positions
- Champions: (1) Florida State (3rd title)
- Runners-up: (4) BYU
- Semifinalists: (1) Rutgers; Santa Clara

Tournament statistics
- Matches played: 63
- Goals scored: 194 (3.08 per match)
- Top goal scorer(s): Mikayla Colohan – BYU (5 goals)

The 2021 NCAA Division I women's soccer tournament was the 40th edition of the NCAA Division I Women's Soccer Tournament, a postseason tournament to determine the national champion of NCAA Division I women's college soccer. The College Cup was played on December 3 and December 6. It was originally set to be played in San Jose, California, but was moved to Stevens Stadium due to a conflict with the MLS playoffs schedule.

The Florida State Seminoles defeated the BYU Cougars on penalty kicks to win the national championship.

== Qualification ==
The tournament returned to 64 teams after only featuring 48 teams in the 2020 edition due to the COVID-19 pandemic. The tournament also returns to the fall, after being held in the spring in 2020. The tournament also returned to its normal format of having the higher seeds host matches until the College Cup.

All Division I women's soccer programs are eligible to qualify for the tournament. 28 teams received automatic bids by winning their conference tournaments, 3 teams received automatic bids by claiming the conference regular season crown (Ivy League, Pac-12 Conference, and West Coast Conference don't hold conference tournaments), and an additional 33 teams earned at-large bids based on their regular season records.

Automatic bids
Conference	Team	Date qualified	Record	Appearance	Last Bid
ACC	Florida State	November 7	16–1–2	22	2020
America East	Vermont	November 7	12–5–1	2	1984
American	Memphis	November 7	13–4–2	10	2020
ASUN	Lipscomb	November 6	15–4–1	3	2019
Atlantic 10	Saint Louis	November 7	12–8–1	6	2020
Big 12	TCU	November 7	17–2–2	6	2020
Big East	Georgetown	November 7	13–1–6	12	2020
Big Sky	Montana	November 7	12–5–1	6	2020
Big South	High Point	November 7	10–7–2	7	2017
Big Ten	Michigan	November 7	15–3–3	15	2019
Big West	UC Irvine	November 7	15–5–0	3	2011
CAA	Hofstra	November 7	16–3–1	9	2019
C-USA	Old Dominion	November 7	13–4–1	2	2006
Horizon	Milwaukee	November 6	18–1–0	15	2020
Ivy	Brown	October 30	12–3–0	8	2019
MAAC	Monmouth	November 7	15–4–1	8	2019
MAC	Bowling Green	November 7	11–6–3	6	2020
Missouri Valley	Loyola Chicago	November 7	13–2–2	7	2020
Mountain West	New Mexico	November 6	14–4–2	4	2020
Northeast	Central Connecticut	November 7	13–5–0	11	2020
Ohio Valley	SIU Edwardsville	November 7	11–6–0	4	2020
Pac-12	UCLA	November 5	16–0–3	25	2020
Patriot	Bucknell	November 7	11–7–3	5	2017
SEC	Tennessee	November 7	18–2–0	13	2018
SoCon	Samford	November 7	15–3–2	6	2019
Southland	Northwestern State	November 7	11–5–3	3	2005
The Summit	South Dakota State	November 6	14–3–1	6	2019
Sun Belt	South Alabama	November 7	12–4–3	8	2020
SWAC	Prairie View A&M	November 7	12–3–3	3	2019
WAC	Grand Canyon	November 7	16–3–2	1	None
WCC	Santa Clara	November 6	11–5–2	31	2020

At-Large Bids
Conference	Team	Record	Appearance	Last Bid
ACC	Clemson	12–6–1	22	2020
ACC	Duke	13–3–1	27	2020
ACC	NC State	8–8–2	16	2019
ACC	North Carolina	12–2–3	40	2020
ACC	Notre Dame	13–5–1	27	2019
ACC	Virginia	16–2–2	34	2020
ACC	Virginia Tech	11–5–2	11	2019
ACC	Wake Forest	15–5–0	21	2018
American	SMU	11–4–2	14	2016
American	South Florida	12–3–3	8	2020
Big 12	Texas	11–4–6	15	2019
Big East	Butler	15–4–1	3	2017
Big East	Providence	10–6–3	2	1993
Big East	St. John's	12–6–2	4	2015
Big East	Xavier	16–2–1	4	2019
Big Ten	Ohio State	9–8–2	14	2020
Big Ten	Penn State	11–7–0	27	2020
Big Ten	Purdue	14–4–2	7	2009
Big Ten	Rutgers	17–3–0	16	2020
Big Ten	Wisconsin	8–5–6	22	2019
Ivy	Harvard	12–2–1	17	2016
Ivy	Princeton	14–2–1	13	2018
Pac-12	Stanford	13–5–1	30	2019
Pac-12	USC	13–3–2	20	2020
Pac-12	Washington State	13–2–4	14	2019
SEC	Alabama	10–9–1	4	2017
SEC	Arkansas	16–4–0	8	2020
SEC	Auburn	12–6–1	17	2018
SEC	LSU	11–7–1	7	2018
SEC	Ole Miss	12–5–3	10	2020
SEC	South Carolina	11–6–1	15	2020
WCC	BYU	13–4–1	22	2020
WCC	Pepperdine	15–3–1	11	2019

== Bracket ==
The bracket was announced on Monday, November 8, 2021. First round games were played on November 12, 13 or 14 at campus sites.

=== Florida State Bracket ===
First round Campus Sites
1	Florida State*	3
South Alabama	0
SMU*	2
Texas	0
South Florida*	0
NC State	2
South Dakota State	1
4	Pepperdine*	7
3	Tennessee*	3
Lipscomb	0
Washington State*	3
Montana	0
Wake Forest*	3
Harvard	0
Bowling Green	0
2	Michigan*	3

Second round Regional Campus Sites
1	Florida State*	5
SMU	1
NC State	0
4	Pepperdine	3
3	Tennessee	2
Washington State	0
Wake Forest	0
2	Michigan*	2

Round of 16; Regional Campus Sites
1	Florida State*	1
4	Pepperdine	0
3	Tennessee	0
2	Michigan*	3

Quarterfinal; Campus Sites
1	Florida State* (a.e.t.)	1
2	Michigan	0

* Host institution

==== Schedule ====
===== First round =====
November 12, 2021	#6 Tennessee	3–0	Lipscomb	Knoxville, TN
5:00 pm EST	Abbey Burdette 28'; Cariel Ellis 74'; Taylor Huff 75'	Report	(yellow card) 62' Logan McFadden; (yellow card) 63' Allie Dunn	Stadium: Regal Stadium; Attendance: 1,868; Referee: Aaron Hernandez; Assistant referees: Eric Usher; Ryan Starr; Fourth official: Joe Kirkpatrick

November 12, 2021	#1 Florida State	3–0	South Alabama	Tallahassee, FL
6:00 pm EST	Jody Brown 24'; Beata Olsson 27', (yellow card) 28'; Emily Madril 83'	Report	(yellow card) 70' Danielle Fuentes	Stadium: Seminole Soccer Complex; Attendance: 2,125; Referee: Richonne Clark; Assistant referees: Abdel Kuttaineh; Arnel Selman

November 12, 2021	#9 Michigan	3–0	Bowling Green	Ann Arbor, MI
6:00 p.m. EST	Meredith Haakenson 18'; Alia Martin (yellow card) 31'; Nicki Hernandez 59'; Kacey Lawrence 77'	Report	(yellow card) 31' Nikki Cox	Stadium: U-M Soccer Stadium; Attendance: 1,390; Referee: Austin Saini; Assistant referees: Anthony Vasoli; Jeffery Mellen; Fourth official: Steve Grinczel

November 13, 2021	#19 Pepperdine	7–1	South Dakota State	Malibu, CA
3:00 pm EST	Calista Reyes 4', 66'; Joelle Anderson 7'; Carlee Giammona 23'; Skylar Enge 37'; Kelsey Hill 40'; Tori Waldeck 54'	Report	Cece Limongi 53'	Stadium: Rokus Field; Attendance: 507; Referee: Andrea Reyes; Assistant referees: Jaclyn Reilman; Kristin Patterson; Fourth official: Matt Ng

November 13, 2021	#15 Washington State	3–0	Montana	Pullman, WA
8:00 pm EST	Marin Whieldon 37'; Sydney Pulver 79' (pen.); Grayson Lynch 83'	Report	(yellow card) 61' Sydney Haustein	Stadium: Lower Soccer Field; Attendance: 1,181; Referee: Josh Wilkens; Assistant referees: Brian Lambrecht; Nicole Steiner; Fourth official: Jason Steiner

November 14, 2021	#23 South Florida	0–2	NC State	Tampa, FL
1:00 pm EST		Report	Annika Wohner 24'; Fernanda Soto (yellow card) 47'; Jameese Joseph 51'	Stadium: Corbett Stadium; Attendance: 797; Referee: Tori Penso; Assistant referees: Erika Barahona; Sariena Vasquez; Fourth official: Igor Santos

November 14, 2021	#25 SMU	2–0	#21 Texas	Dallas, TX
2:00 pm EST	Alina Khan 6'; Wayny Balata 48'; Samantha Estrada (yellow card) 63'	Report		Stadium: Washburne Stadium; Attendance: 1,200; Referee: Brandon Gardner; Assistant referees: Tony Obas; Thomas Caliendo; Fourth official: Habeeb Hooshmand

November 14, 2021	Wake Forest	3–0	Harvard	Winston-Salem, NC
4:00 pm EST	Sofia Rossi 12'; Hulda Arnarsdottir 58'; Shayla Smart 61'	Report		Stadium: Spry Stadium; Attendance: 1,213; Referee: Elvis Mahmutovic; Assistant referees: Mark Buda; Gabriel Rivera; Fourth official: Raymond Thomas

===== Second round =====
November 19, 2021	#19 Pepperdine	3–0	NC State	Tallahassee, FL
2:00 p.m. EST	Calista Reyes 2'; Carlee Giammona 67'; Joelle Anderson 71'; Victoria Romero (yellow card) 74'	Report	(yellow card) 34' Fernanda Soto	Stadium: Seminole Soccer Complex; Attendance: 258; Referee: Johnathan Bilinski; Assistant referees: Andy Boyle; Carmelo LoFaro; Fourth official: Megan McDougall

November 19, 2021	#6 Tennessee	2–0	#15 Washington State	Ann Arbor, MI
2:00 p.m. EST	Jordan Fusco 24'; Taylor Huff 33'	Report	(yellow card) 16' (yellow-red card) Sydney Studer; (yellow card) 34' Margie Detrizio	Stadium: U-M Soccer Stadium; Referee: Nicole Green; Assistant referees: Christian Little; Jake Brochu; Fourth official: Donovan Noocha

November 19, 2021	#1 Florida State	5–1	#25 SMU	Tallahassee, FL
5:00 p.m. EST	Yujie Zhao 22'; Jody Brown 28'; Beata Olsson 51'; Gabby Carle 72'; Kristina Lynch 83'	Report	81' (pen.) Lindsey Whitmore	Stadium: Seminole Soccer Complex; Attendance: 1,504; Referee: Jonathan Weiner; Assistant referees: Arnel Selman; Kayla Polonsky; Fourth official: Kevin Flynn

November 19, 2021	#9 Michigan	2–0	Wake Forest	Ann Arbor, MI
5:00 p.m. EST	Own Goal 15' (o.g.); Sydney Shepherd (yellow card) 59'; Meredith Haakenson 66' (pen.); Kacey Lawrence (yellow card) 75'	Report	(yellow card) 57' (yellow-red card) Giovanna DeMarco; (yellow card) 71' Malaika Meena	Stadium: U-M Soccer Stadium; Attendance: 1,457; Referee: Heber Estrada; Assistant referees: Rachel Smith; Maggie Short; Fourth official: Courtney Hayworth

===== Round of 16 =====
November 21, 2021	#9 Michigan	3–0	#6 Tennessee	Ann Arbor, MI
1:00 p.m. EST	Sarah Stratigakis 15'; Meredith Haakenson 26'; Sammi Woods 66'; Lily Farkas (yellow card) 80'	Report		Stadium: U-M Soccer Stadium; Attendance: 1,008; Referee: Alex Beehler; Assistant referees: Ethan Buege; Stephen Milhoan; Fourth official: Steve Besk

November 21, 2021	#1 Florida State	1–0	#19 Pepperdine	Tallahassee, FL
2:00 p.m. EST	Jody Brown 5'	Report	(yellow card) 64' Victoria Romero	Stadium: Seminole Soccer Complex; Attendance: 1,367; Referee: Alyssa Nichols; Assistant referees: Sam Bilbo; Abdel Kuttaineh; Fourth official: Igor Sanots

===== Quarterfinals =====
November 26, 2021	#1 Florida State	1–0 (a.e.t.)	#9 Michigan	Tallahassee, FL
	Jody Brown (yellow card) 51'; Kirsten Pavlisko (yellow card) 94'; Beata Olsson 100'	Report		Stadium: Seminole Soccer Complex; Attendance: 2,005; Referee: Mark Kadlecik; Assistant referees: Albert Escovar; Adam Brzozowiec; Fourth official: Richonne Clark

Rankings from United Soccer Coaches Final Regular Season Rankings

=== Rutgers Bracket ===
First round Campus Sites
2	Arkansas*	5
Northwestern State	1
Virginia Tech*	3
Ohio State	1
Purdue (a.e.t.)*	1
Loyola Chicago	0
SIU Edwardsville	0
3	Notre Dame*	4
4	TCU*	8
Prairie View A&M	0
Princeton*	2
Vermont	0
Ole Miss*	1
Saint Louis	2
Bucknell	0
1	Rutgers*	2

Second round Regional Campus Sites
2	Arkansas*	3
Virginia Tech	0
Purdue	1 (3)
3	Notre Dame (pen.)	1 (4)
4	TCU (a.e.t.)	3
Princeton	2
Saint Louis	0
1	Rutgers*	4

Round of 16; Regional Campus Sites
2	Arkansas*	3
3	Notre Dame	2
4	TCU	1 (4)
1	Rutgers (pen.)*	1 (5)

Quarterfinal; Campus Sites
2	Arkansas	2 (2)
1	Rutgers (pen.)*	2 (4)

* Host institution

==== Schedule ====
===== First round =====
November 12, 2021	Princeton	2–0	Vermont	Princeton, NJ
6:00 p.m.	Tatum Gee 13', 19'; Grace Barbara (yellow card) 41'	Report	(yellow card) 38' Ella Bankert	Stadium: Roberts Stadium; Attendance: 871; Referee: Eric Weisbrod; Assistant referees: Rob Komorowski; Jamiel Ahmad; Fourth official: Larry Urwiler

November 12, 2021	Virginia Tech	3–1	Ohio State	Blacksburg, VA
6:00 p.m.	Emily Gray 12'; Allie George (yellow card) 35'; Allie Lewis (yellow card) 61'; Tori Powell 68'; Emma Steigerwald 84'	Report	(yellow card) 7' Talani Barnett; 47' Emma Sears; (yellow card) 65' Caitlin Foley	Stadium: Thompson Field; Attendance: 797; Referee: Karl Kummer; Assistant referees: Jennifer Dumaine; Jeremy Smith; Fourth official: Hicham El Bariqi

November 12, 2021	#7 Arkansas	5–1	Northwestern State	Fayetteville, AR
7:30 p.m.	Taylor Malham 4'; Emilee Hauser 19'; Anna Podojil 23'; Ava Tankersley 27'; Van Fitch 71'	Report	54' Natalee Henry; (yellow card) 71' Jayme Haynes	Stadium: Razorback Field; Attendance: 1,097; Referee: Jose Lara-Mancia; Assistant referees: Matt Trotter; Velimir Stefanovic; Fourth official: Daniel Ortega

November 12, 2021	#17 Ole Miss	1–2	Saint Louis	Oxford, MS
8:00 p.m.	Mo O'Connor 23'	Report	23' Mattyn Summers; 89' Hannah Friedrich	Stadium: Ole Miss Soccer Stadium; Attendance: 684; Referee: Andrew Musashe; Assistant referees: Rebecca Marshall; Logan Reeves; Fourth official: Hal Youngblood

November 12, 2021	#8 TCU	8–0	Prairie View A&M	Fort Worth, TX
8:00 p.m.	Gracie Brian 8', 24', 49'; Oli Peña 25'; Messiah Bright 57'; Lauren Memoly 66'; Skylar Heinrich 76'; Own Goal 82' (o.g.)	Report		Stadium: Garvey-Rosenthal Stadium; Attendance: 1,096; Referee: Timothy Debysingh; Assistant referees: Jacob Larson; Janae Thompson; Fourth official: Joel McKell

November 13, 2021	#24 Purdue	1–0 (a.e.t.)	Loyola Chicago	West Lafayette, IN
7:00 p.m.	Sarah Griffith 104'	Report		Stadium: Folk Field; Attendance: 1,082; Referee: Nicholas Balcer; Assistant referees: Ryan Ash; Audra Fullen; Fourth official: Boris Vukovic

November 14, 2021	#5 Rutgers	2–0	Bucknell	Piscataway, NJ
1:00 p.m.	Frankie Tagliaferri 30'; Riley Tiernan 61'	Report		Stadium: Yurcak Field; Attendance: 1,654; Referee: George Evanego

November 14, 2021	Notre Dame	4–0	SIU Edwardsville	Notre Dame, IN
1:00 p.m.	Korbin Albert 4', 42'; Brianna Martinez 36'; Kiki Van Zanten (yellow card) 38'; Sammi Fisher 59'	Report		Stadium: Alumni Stadium; Attendance: 204; Referee: Shane Butler; Assistant referees: Maggie Short; Matthew Rodman; Fourth official: Brandon Artis

===== Second round =====
November 19, 2021	#5 Rutgers	4–0	Saint Louis	Piscataway, NJ
2:00 p.m.	Amirah Ali 4'; Riley Tiernan 49', 69'; Kylie Daigle 79'	Report		Stadium: Yurcak Field; Attendance: 1,682; Referee: Magda Zwierzchowski; Assistant referees: Ryan Myers; John Barr; Fourth official: Duan White

November 19, 2021	Notre Dame	1–1 (a.e.t.) (4–3 p)	#24 Purdue	Fayetteville, AR
4:30 p.m.	Olivia Wingate 28'	Report	7' Emily Mathews	Stadium: Razorback Field; Referee: Daniel Radford; Assistant referees: Ryan Starr; Brandon Queri; Fourth official: Lawrence Hale
	Penalties
	Maddie Mercado (penalty scored); Sammi Fisher (penalty missed); Korbin Albert (penalty scored); Kiki Van Zanten (penalty scored); Brianna Martinez (penalty scored)		(penalty scored) Sarah Griffith; (penalty scored) Emily Mathews; (penalty scored) Grace Walsh; (penalty missed) Aly Mielke; (penalty missed) Chloe Woodbeck

November 19, 2021	#8 TCU	3–2 (a.e.t.)	Princeton	Piscataway, NJ
5:00 p.m.	Messiah Bright 71', 89' 106'	Report	36' Lily Bryant; 73' Jen Estes	Stadium: Yurcak Field; Attendance: 423; Referee: David Breckner; Assistant referees: Chase Turner; Nick Zegestowsky; Fourth official: DaQing Song

November 19, 2021	#7 Arkansas	3–0	Virginia Tech	Fayetteville, AR
7:30 p.m.	Anna Podojil 5'; Reagan Swindall 52'; Parker Goins 56'	Report	(yellow card) 42' Allie Lewis	Stadium: Razorback Field; Attendance: 1,505; Referee: Samantha Martinez; Assistant referees: Shane Cowger; Matt Trotter; Fourth official: Jose Lara-Mancia

===== Round of 16 =====
November 21, 2021	#5 Rutgers	1–1 (a.e.t.) (5–4 p)	#8 TCU	Piscataway, NJ
1:00 p.m. EST	Amirah Ali 18'	Report	85' Camryn Lancaster; (yellow card) 109' Olivia Hasler	Stadium: Yurcak Field; Attendance: 2,892; Referee: Luis Arroyo; Assistant referees: Andrew Eitel; Inga Maric; Fourth official: Mike De Feliece
	Penalties
	Becci Fluchel (penalty scored); Amirah Ali (penalty scored); Meagan McClelland (penalty scored); Riley Tiernan (penalty scored); Gabby Provenzano (penalty missed); Giana Romano (penalty missed); Allison Lowrey (penalty scored)		(penalty scored) Tijana Duricek; (penalty scored) Grace Collins; (penalty scored) Maddy Warren; (penalty scored) Brandi Peterson; (penalty missed) Jenna Winebrenner; (penalty missed) Messiah Bright; (penalty missed) Skylar Heinrich

November 21, 2021	#7 Arkansas	3–2	Notre Dame	Fayetteville, AR
4:30 p.m. CST	Taylor Malham 10', 77'; Kayla McKeon (yellow card) 42'; Parker Goins 54'; Kiley Dulaney (yellow card) 74'	Report	22' Korbin Albert; (yellow card) 38' Brooke VanDyck; 63' Olivia Wingate; (yellow card) 65' Sammi Fisher; (yellow card) 90' Team	Stadium: Razorback Field; Attendance: 1,579; Referee: Mark Kadlecik; Assistant referees: Shane Kennard; Jay Norris; Fourth official: Matt Trotter

===== Quarterfinals =====
November 26, 2021	#5 Rutgers	2–2 (a.e.t.) (4–2 p)	#7 Arkansas	Piscataway, NJ
	Riley Tiernan 2'; Bea Franklin (yellow card) 27'; Parker Goins (yellow card) 39'; Amirah Ali 43'; Taylor Malham (yellow card) 78'	Report	8' Anna Podojil; 15' Reagan Swindall	Stadium: Yurcak Field; Attendance: 4,672; Referee: Corey Rockwell; Assistant referees: Victoria Catanzaro; Dustin Nguyen; Fourth official: Gregory DeMello
	Penalties
	Becci Fluchel (penalty scored); Amirah Ali (penalty scored); Meagan McClelland (penalty scored); Riley Tiernan (penalty scored)		(penalty missed) Anna Podojil; (penalty scored) Kaelee Van Gundy; (penalty missed) Haley VanFossen; (penalty scored) Parker Goins

Rankings from United Soccer Coaches Final Regular Season Rankings

=== Duke Bracket ===
First round Campus Sites
1	Duke*	1
Old Dominion	0
Memphis*	3
LSU	0
Brown*	0
St. John's (a.e.t.)	1
Samford	2
4	Auburn*	0
3	Georgetown*	6
Central Connecticut	0
Santa Clara*	1
Stanford	0
Wisconsin*	2
Butler	1
UC Irvine	1
2	UCLA*	0

Second round Regional Campus Sites
1	Duke*	1
Memphis	0
St. John's (pen.)	2 (3)
Samford	2 (0)
3	Georgetown*	1
Santa Clara (a.e.t.)	2
Wisconsin	3
UC Irvine	0

Round of 16; Regional Campus Sites
1	Duke*	7
St. John's	1
Santa Clara	2
Wisconsin	1

Quarterfinal; Campus Sites
1	Duke*	1
Santa Clara	2

* Host institution

==== Schedule ====
===== First round =====
November 12, 2021	#4 Duke	1–0	Old Dominion	Durham, NC
6:00 p.m.	Nichole Chico (yellow card) 90'; Caitlin Cosme 90'	Report	(yellow card) 62' Carla Morich; (yellow card) 68' Gry Boe Thrysoe	Stadium: Koskinen Stadium; Attendance: 937; Referee: Brandon Marion; Assistant referees: Raymond Thomas; Robert Dail; Fourth official: Clive Edwards

November 12, 2021	Auburn	0–2	Samford	Auburn, AL
6:00 p.m.	Riley Petcosky (yellow card) 87'	Report	(yellow card) 60' Caroine Donovan; 61' Mary Raymond; 77' Taylor Yount	Stadium: Auburn Soccer Complex; Attendance: 436; Referee: Aleksandar Zhelyazkov; Assistant referees: Oladokun Faduyile; Sam Bilbo; Fourth official: Carmelo LoFaro

November 12, 2021	Wisconsin	2–1	Butler	Madison, WI
7:00 p.m.	Natalie Viggiano 23', 75'	Report	(yellow card) 56' Alana Wood; 70' Morgan Kloosterman	Stadium: McClimon Stadium; Attendance: 411; Referee: Christopher Koloffon; Assistant referees: Erin Patterson; David Avignone; Fourth official: Kevin Cavalcanti

November 12, 2021	#3 UCLA	0–1	UC Irvine	Los Angeles, California
9:00 p.m.		Report	(yellow card) 4' Chloe Ragon; 14' Alyssa Moore	Stadium: Wallis Annenberg Stadium; Attendance: 1,284; Referee: Trevor Rappleye; Assistant referees: Steve Skille; Naomi Nunis; Fourth official: Reyna Fonseca

November 13, 2021	#22 Georgetown	6–0	Central Connecticut	Washington, D.C.
Noon	Kelly Ann Livingstone 56'; Daisy Cleverley 62'; Julia Leas 69', 77'; Sofie Fox 78'; Erika Harwood 81'	Report	(yellow card) 54' Roma McLaughlin; (yellow card) 70' Jamie Collimore	Stadium: Shaw Field; Attendance: 305; Referee: Sergio Gonzalez; Assistant referees: William Aten; Ryan Nee; Fourth official: Max Smith

November 13, 2021	#16 Brown	0–1 (a.e.t.)	St. John's	Providence, RI
1:00 p.m.		Report	(yellow card) 75' Athina Sofroniou; 99' Ava Collins	Stadium: Stevenson Field; Attendance: 981; Referee: Ashley Cedro; Assistant referees: Shannon Malloy; Eric Schreiber; Fourth official: Kara Hontumb

November 13, 2021	#12 Santa Clara	1–0	#20 Stanford	Santa Clara, CA
4:00 p.m.	Makoto Nezu 59'; Izzy D'Aquila (yellow card) 72'; Alex Loera (yellow card) 72'	Report	(yellow card) 89' Maya Doms	Stadium: Stevens Stadium; Attendance: 2,561; Referee: Christopher Spivey; Assistant referees: Sarah Cortez; Brandon Chapman; Fourth official: Jonathan Simon

November 14, 2021	#18 Memphis	3–0	LSU	Memphis, TN
2:00 p.m.	Jocelyn Alonzo 50'; Aubrey Mister 74'; Bryana Buttar 78'	Report		Stadium: Rose Soccer Complex; Attendance: 1,309; Referee: Joshua Brooks; Assistant referees: Lucy Bell; Kiah Haslett; Fourth official: Matthew Bell

===== Second round =====
November 19, 2021	#22 Georgetown	1–2 (a.e.t.)	#12 Santa Clara	Washington, D.C.
1:30 p.m.	Sydney Cummings 23'; Claire Manning (yellow card) 70'	Report	17' Kelsey Turnbow; (yellow card) 43' Lucy Mitchell; (yellow card) 67' Skylar Smith; 99' Izzy D'Aquila	Stadium: Shaw Field; Attendance: 301; Referee: Mike De Felice; Assistant referees: Lius Diego Arroyo; Dilok Boonmema; Fourth official: Ryan Trombetta

November 19, 2021	Wisconsin	3–0	UC Irvine	Fairfax, VA
1:30 p.m.	Natalie Viggiano 22', (yellow card) 72'; Joyelle Washington 26'; Izzy Verdugo 72'; Riley Philbin (yellow card) 84'	Report		Stadium: George Mason Stadium; Attendance: 164; Referee: Stephen Foster; Assistant referees: Sharon Gingrich; Jason Blight; Fourth official: Eric Weisbrod

November 19, 2021	St. John's	2–2 (a.e.t.) (3–0 p)	Samford	Durham, NC
4:00 p.m.	Nicole Gordon 15'; Addison Hornsey (yellow card) 43'; Shannon Aviza 52'	Report	28' Alyssa Conarton; (yellow card) 45' Caroline Donovan; 81' (pen.) Alyssa Frazier	Stadium: Koskinen Stadium; Attendance: 803; Referee: Kyle Johnston; Assistant referees: Jude Carr; Emma Richards; Fourth official: Ross McKernan
	Penalties
	Jessica Garziano (penalty scored); Zsani Kajan (penalty missed); Shannon Aviza (penalty scored); Michelle Money (penalty scored)		(penalty missed) Taylor Yount; (penalty missed) Kyla Reynolds; (penalty missed) Ella Simpson

November 19, 2021	#4 Duke	1–0	Memphis	Durham, NC
6:30 p.m.	Delaney Graham 43'	Report	(yellow card) 35' Saorla Miller; (yellow card) 60' Caroline Duncan	Stadium: Koskinen Stadium; Attendance: 3,595; Referee: Patrick Schmidt; Assistant referees: Jeremy Smith; Rick Rogers; Fourth official: Abbas Piran

===== Round of 16 =====
November 21, 2021	#12 Santa Clara	2–1	Wisconsin	Washington, D.C.
2:00 p.m. EST	Alex Loera 66'; Emma Reeves (red card) 61'; Karly Reeves 83'	Report	70' Emma Jaskaniec	Stadium: Shaw Field; Attendance: 223; Referee: JC Griggs; Assistant referees: Eric Weisbrod; Jason Blight; Fourth official: Larry Urwiler

November 21, 2021	#4 Duke	7–1	St. John's	Durham, NC
6:00 p.m. EST	Michelle Cooper 4', 28'; Tess Boade 26'; Mackenzie Pluck 62'; Olivia Migli 69' (pen.), 81'; Grace Watkins 82'	Report	47' Maia Cabrera	Stadium: Koskinen Stadium; Attendance: 1,014; Referee: Mark Gorak; Assistant referees: Benjamin Wooten; Hudson Owens; Fourth official: Hicham El Bariqi

===== Quarterfinals =====
November 26, 2021	#4 Duke	1–2	#12 Santa Clara	Durham, NC
	Olivia Migli 62'	Report	25' Izzy D'Aquila; 29' Kelsey Turnbow; (yellow card) 47' Marisa Bubnis; (yellow card) 77' Alex Loera	Stadium: Koskinen Stadium; Attendance: 1,031; Referee: Meghan Mullen; Assistant referees: Ryan Graves; Sharon Gingrich; Fourth official: Brandon Marion

Rankings from United Soccer Coaches Final Regular Season Rankings

=== Virginia Bracket ===
First round Campus Sites
2	North Carolina*	0
South Carolina	1
Hofstra*	3
Providence	0
Penn State*	3
Monmouth	1
Grand Canyon	0
3	USC*	6
4	BYU*	6
New Mexico	0
Clemson*	0
Alabama	1
Xavier*	0
Milwaukee	1
High Point	0
1	Virginia*	6

Second round Regional Campus Sites
South Carolina	3
Hofstra	0
Penn State (pen.)	2 (5)
3	USC*	2 (3)
4	BYU	4
Alabama	1
Milwaukee	0
1	Virginia*	2

Round of 16; Regional Campus Sites
South Carolina	2
Penn State	0
4	BYU	1
1	Virginia*	0

Quarterfinal; Campus Sites
South Carolina	1
4	BYU*	4

* Host institution

==== Schedule ====
===== First round =====
November 12, 2021	Clemson	0–1	Alabama	Clemson, SC
4:00 p.m.	Sydney Dawson (yellow card) 5'; Makenna Morris (yellow card) 21'	Report	4' Allie Berk; (yellow card) 68' Gessica Skorka; (yellow card) 74' Sasha Pickard; (yellow card) 78' Team	Stadium: Riggs Field; Attendance: 527; Referee: Sorin Stoica; Assistant referees: Zachary McWhorter; Kiah Haslett; Fourth official: Chris Zuerner

November 12, 2021	Penn State	3–1	Monmouth	State College, PA
6:00 p.m.	Ally Schlegel 26'; Payton Linnehan 39'; Rachel Wasserman 75'	Report	78' Rachel Ludwick	Stadium: Jeffrey Field; Attendance: 521; Referee: John Brady; Assistant referees: Cody Hack; Max Campbell; Fourth official: Mark Goron

November 12, 2021	#2 Virginia	6–0	High Point	Charlottesville, VA
6:00 p.m.	Own Goal 12' (o.g.); Sydney Zandi 17'; Alexis Theoret 20'; Sarah Brunner 41'; Diana Ordoñez 60'; Kira Maguire 71'	Report		Stadium: Klöckner Stadium; Attendance: 1,201; Referee: Emma Richards; Assistant referees: Robert Velbis; Kevin Uitto; Fourth official: Mark Kadlecik

November 13, 2021	Hofstra	3–0	Providence	Hempstead, NY
1:00 p.m.	Georgia Brown 27'; Lucy Porter 31'; Miri Taylor 57'	Report		Stadium: Hofstra Soccer Stadium; Attendance: 805; Referee: Katherine McCormick; Assistant referees: Ian Mangione; Victoria Catanzaro; Fourth official: Brian Dunn

November 13, 2021	#10 North Carolina	0–1	South Carolina	Chapel Hill, NC
2:00 p.m.	Maggie Pierce (yellow card) 52'	Report	81' Luciana Zullo	Stadium: Dorrance Field; Attendance: 2,390; Referee: JC Griggs; Assistant referees: Jude Carr; Benjamin Wooten; Fourth official: Elvis Mahmutovic

November 13, 2021	#11 USC	6–0	Grand Canyon	Los Angeles, CA
4:00 p.m.	Croix Bethune 4', 7', 9'; Simi Awujo 19'; Penelope Hocking 47'; Aaliyah Farmer 48'	Report		Stadium: McAlister Field; Attendance: 502; Referee: Robert Sarfaraz; Assistant referees: Salma Perez; Abdel Hakeem Wakil; Fourth official: Yoel Miller

November 13, 2021	#14 Xavier	0–1	Milwaukee	Cincinnati, OH
4:00 p.m.		Report	16' Taylor Hattori; (yellow card) 88' Mackenzie Schill	Stadium: Corcoran Field; Attendance: 423; Referee: Nicole Green; Assistant referees: Chris Schurfranz; Jacob Little; Fourth official: Joshua Brooks

November 13, 2021	#13 BYU	6–0	New Mexico	Provo, UT
7:00 p.m.	Cameron Tucker 36'; Brecken Mozingo 53', 55'; Jamie Shepherd 64'; Own Goal 69' (o.g.); Ellie Maughan 71'	Report	(yellow card) 35' Isais Myah	Stadium: South Field; Attendance: 2,745; Referee: Younes Marrakchi; Assistant referees: Hao Guo; Jordan Downs; Fourth official: Nick DelGreco

===== Second round =====
November 18, 2021	#13 BYU	4–1	Alabama	Charlottesville, VA
4:00 p.m. EST	Cameron Tucker 4'; Mikayla Colohan 20' (pen.), 44', 74'; Kendell Petersen (yellow card) 44'; Brecken Mozingo (yellow card) 48'	Report	(yellow card) 3' Reyna Reyes; (yellow card) 48' Gessica Skorka; 65' Felicia Knox; (yellow card) 85' Sasha Pickard	Stadium: Klöckner Stadium; Referee: Lucas Feathers; Assistant referees: Bill Dittmar; Robert Velbis; Fourth official: Aaron Hormuth

November 18, 2021	#2 Virginia	2–0	Milwaukee	Charlottesville, VA
7:00 p.m. EST	Diana Ordoñez 26', 83'; Sydney Zandi (yellow card) 62'	Report	(yellow card) 48' Taylor Hattori	Stadium: Klöckner Stadium; Attendance: 1,445; Referee: JC Griggs; Assistant referees: Nicholas Seymour; Hudson Owens; Fourth official: John Brady

November 19, 2021	Hofstra	0–3	South Carolina	Los Angeles, CA
11:00 a.m. PST		Report	22' Samantha Chang; 77' Catherine Barry; 87' Ryan Gareis	Stadium: McAlister Field

November 19, 2021	#11 USC	2–2 (a.e.t.) (3–5 p)	Penn State	Los Angeles, CA
1:30 p.m. PST	Penelope Hocking 49'; Simone Jackson 86'	Report	21', 57' Ally Schlegel	Stadium: McAlister Field; Attendance: 897; Referee: Karen Callado; Assistant referees: Kira Helmer; Andie Reyes; Fourth official: Jared Kennedy
	Penalties
	Olufolasade Adamolekun (penalty missed); Helena Sampaio (penalty scored); Zoe Burns (penalty scored); Penelope Hocking (penalty scored)		(penalty scored) Sam Coffey; (penalty scored) Jordan Canniff; (penalty scored) Maud Asbroek; (penalty scored) Cori Dyke; (penalty scored) Ally Schlegel

===== Round of 16 =====
November 20, 2021	#2 Virginia	0–1	#13 BYU	Charlottesville, VA
7:00 p.m. EST		Report	(yellow card) 33' Mikayla Colohan; 47', (yellow card) 88' Cameron Tucker; (yellow card) 82' Rachel McCarthy	Stadium: Klöckner Stadium; Attendance: 0 Referee: Karl Kummer; Assistant referees: Raymond Thomas; Ryan Graves; Fourth official: Emma Richards

November 21, 2021	Penn State	0–2	South Carolina	Los Angeles, CA
12:00 p.m. PST		Report	49' Samantha Chang; 56' Luciana Zullo	Stadium: McAlister Field; Attendance: 219; Referee: William Hoffman; Assistant referees: Kristin Patterson; Jaclyn Reilman; Fourth official: Victor Ruiz

===== Quarterfinals =====
November 26, 2021	#13 BYU	4–1	South Carolina	Provo, UT
5:00 p.m. MST	Makaylie Moore 3', 61'; Mikayla Colohan 15', 47'; Makaylie Moore (yellow card) 75'	Report	40' Corinna Zullo; (yellow card) 71' Jyllissa Harris; (yellow card) 89' Remi Swartz	Stadium: South Field; Attendance: 4,131; Referee: Brad Jensen; Assistant referees: Karsten Gillwald; Jordan Downs; Fourth official: Josh Mills

Rankings from United Soccer Coaches Final Regular Season Rankings

=== College Cup ===
Semifinals; December 3 Stevens Stadium; Santa Clara, California
1	Florida State	1
1	Rutgers	0
Santa Clara	0 (2)
4	BYU (pen.)	0 (3)

Final; December 6 Stevens Stadium; Santa Clara, California
1	Florida State (pen.)	0 (4)
4	BYU	0 (3)

==== Schedule ====
===== Semifinals =====
December 3, 2021	#1 Florida State	1–0	#5 Rutgers	Santa Clara, CA
4:00 p.m. PST	Jaelin Howell 71'	Report		Stadium: Stevens Stadium; Attendance: 0 Referee: Samantha Martinez; Assistant referees: Rachel Smith; Kristen Patterson; Fourth official: Jamie Padilla

December 3, 2021	#12 Santa Clara	0–0 (a.e.t.) (2–3 p)	#13 BYU	Santa Clara, CA
6:30 PST		Report		Stadium: Stevens Stadium; Attendance: 7,600; Referee: Tori Penso; Assistant referees: Matt Rodman; Kate Wasiak; Fourth official: Jamie Padilla
	Penalties
	Sally Menti (penalty scored); Nicole Sweeney (penalty missed); Kelsey Turnbow (penalty missed); Izzy D'Aquila (penalty scored); Ellie Glenn (penalty missed)		(penalty missed) Mikayla Colohan; (penalty missed) Jamie Shepherd; (penalty scored) Brecken Mozingo; (penalty scored) Bella Folino; (penalty scored) Olivia Wade

===== Final =====
December 6, 2021	#1 Florida State	0–0 (a.e.t.) (4–3 p)	#13 BYU	Santa Clara, CA
8:00 p.m. EST	Howell (yellow card) 32'	Report	(yellow card) 79' Colohan	Stadium: Stevens Stadium; Attendance: 7,087; Referee: JC Griggs; Assistant referees: Rachel Smith; Kristen Patterson; Fourth official: Samantha Martinez
	Penalties
	Robbins (penalty scored); Payne (penalty scored); Carle (penalty missed); Howell (penalty scored); Zhao (penalty scored)		(penalty scored) Colohan; (penalty missed) Shepherd; (penalty scored) Mozingo; (penalty missed) Folino; (penalty scored) Wade

== Record by conference ==
Conference	Bids	Record	Pct.	R32	R16	E8	F4	CG	NC
ACC	9	15–8–1	.646	7	4	2	1	1	1
WCC	3	11–3–0	.786	3	3	2	2	1	–
Big Ten	6	9–4–4	.647	5	4	2	1	–	–
SEC	7	9–6–1	.594	4	3	2	–	–	–
Big 12	2	2–1–0	.667	1	1	–	–	–	–
Big East	5	2–5–1	.313	2	1	–	–	–	–
American	3	2–3–0	.400	2	–	–	–	–	–
Atlantic 10	1	1–1–0	.500	1	–	–	–	–	–
Big West	1	1–1–0	.500	1	–	–	–	–	–
CAA	1	1–1–0	.500	1	–	–	–	–	–
Horizon	1	1–1–0	.500	1	–	–	–	–	–
Ivy	3	1–3–0	.250	1	–	–	–	–	–
Pac-12	4	2–3–1	.417	2	–	–	–	–	–
SoCon	1	1–0–1	.750	1	–	–	–	–	–
Other	17	0–17–0	.000	–	–	–	–	–	–

- The R32, S16, E8, F4, CG, and NC columns indicate how many teams from each conference were in the Round of 32 (second round), Round of 16 (third round), Quarterfinals (Elite Eight), Semifinals (Final Four), Championship Game, and National Champion, respectively.
- The following conferences failed to place a team into the round of 32: America East, ASUN, Big Sky, Big South, C-USA, MAAC, MAC, Missouri Valley, Mountain West, Northeast, Ohio Valley, Patriot, Southland, The Summit, Sun Belt, SWAC, WAC. The conference's records have been consolidated in the other row.

== Statistics ==
=== Goalscorers ===
There were 194 goals scored in 63 matches, for an average of 3.08 goals per match.

5 goals

- (United States) Mikayla Colohan – BYU

4 goals

- (United States) Riley Tiernan – Rutgers
- (United States) Messiah Bright – TCU

3 goals

- (United States) Taylor Malham – Arkansas
- (United States) Anna Podojil – Arkansas
- (United States) Cameron Tucker – BYU
- (United States) Olivia Migli – Duke
- (Jamaica) Jody Brown – Florida State
- (Sweden) Beata Olsson – Florida State
- (United States) Meredith Haakenson – Michigan
- (United States) Korbin Albert – Notre Dame
- (United States) Ally Schlegel – Penn State
- (United States) Calista Reyes – Pepperdine
- (United States) Amirah Ali – Rutgers
- (United States) Gracie Brian – TCU
- (United States) Croix Bethune – USC
- (Mexico) Diana Ordóñez – Virginia
- (United States) Natalie Viggiano – Wisconsin

2 goals

- (United States) Parker Goins – Arkansas
- (United States) Reagan Swindall – Arkansas
- (United States) Makaylie Moore – BYU
- (United States) Brecken Mozingo – BYU
- (United States) Michelle Cooper – Duke
- (United States) Julia Leas – Georgetown
- (United States) Olivia Wingate – Notre Dame
- (United States) Joelle Anderson – Pepperdine
- (United States) Carlee Giammona – Pepperdine
- (United States) Tatum Gee – Princeton
- (United States) Izzy D'Aquila – Santa Clara
- (United States) Kelsey Turnbow – Santa Clara
- (Canada) Samantha Chang – South Carolina
- (United States) Luciana Zullo – South Carolina
- (United States) Taylor Huff – Tennessee
- (United States) Penelope Hocking – USC

1 goal

- (United States) Allie Berk – Alabama
- (United States) Felicia Knox – Alabama
- (United States) Van Fitch – Arkansas
- (United States) Emilee Hauser – Arkansas
- (United States) Ava Tankersley – Arkansas
- (United States) Morgan Kloosterman – Butler
- (United States) Ellie Maughan – BYU
- (United States) Jamie Shepherd – BYU
- (United States) Tess Boade – Duke
- (Puerto Rico) Caitlin Cosme – Duke
- (United States) Delaney Graham – Duke
- (United States) Mackenzie Pluck – Duke
- (United States) Grace Watkins – Duke
- (Canada) Gabby Carle – Florida State
- (United States) Jaelin Howell – Florida State
- (United States) Kristina Lynch – Florida State
- (United States) Emily Madril – Florida State
- (China) Yujie Zhao – Florida State
- (New Zealand) Daisy Cleverley – Georgetown
- (Guyana) Sydney Cummings – Georgetown
- (United States) Sofie Fox – Georgetown
- (United States) Erika Harwood – Georgetown
- (United States) Kelly Ann Livingstone – Georgetown
- (Scotland) Georgia Brown – Hofstra
- (England) Lucy Porter – Hofstra
- (Scotland) Miri Taylor – Hofstra
- (United States) Jocelyn Alonzo – Memphis
- (Canada) Bryana Buttar – Memphis
- (United States) Aubrey Mister – Memphis
- (Mexico) Nicki Hernandez – Michigan
- (United States) Kacey Lawrence – Michigan
- (Canada) Sarah Stratigakis – Michigan
- (United States) Sammi Woods – Michigan
- (United States) Taylor Hattori – Milwaukee
- (United States) Rachel Ludwick – Monmouth
- (United States) Jameese Joseph – NC State
- (Germany) Annika Wohner – NC State
- (El Salvador) Sammi Fisher – Notre Dame
- (United States) Brianna Martinez – Notre Dame
- (United States) Natalee Henry – Northwestern State
- (United States) Emma Sears – Ohio State
- (United States) Mo O'Connor – Ole Miss
- (United States) Payton Linnehan – Penn State
- (United States) Rachel Wasserman – Penn State
- (United States) Skylar Enge – Pepperdine
- (United States) Kelsey Hill – Pepperdine
- (United States) Tori Waldeck – Pepperdine
- (United States) Lily Bryant – Princeton
- (United States) Jen Estes – Princeton
- (United States) Sarah Griffith – Purdue
- (United States) Emily Mathews – Purdue
- (United States) Kylie Daigle – Rutgers
- (United States) Frankie Tagliaferri – Rutgers
- (United States) Hannah Friedrich – Saint Louis
- (United States) Mattyn Summers – Saint Louis
- (United States) Alyssa Conarton – Samford
- (United States) Alyssa Frazier – Samford
- (United States) Mary Raymond – Samford
- (United States) Taylor Yount – Samford
- (United States) Alex Loera – Santa Clara
- (Japan) Makoto Nezu – Santa Clara
- (United States) Karly Reeves – Santa Clara
- (Canada) Wayny Balata – SMU
- (United States) Alina Khan – SMU
- (United States) Lindsey Whitmore – SMU
- (United States) Catherine Barry – South Carolina
- (United States) Ryan Gareis – South Carolina
- (United States) Corinna Zullo – South Carolina
- (United States) Cece Limongi – South Dakota State
- (United States) Shannon Aviza – St. John's
- (Dominican Republic) Maia Cabrera – St. John's
- (New Zealand) Ava Collins – St. John's
- (United States) Nicole Gordon – St. John's
- (United States) Skylar Heinrich – TCU
- (United States) Camryn Lancaster – TCU
- (United States) Lauren Memoly – TCU
- (United States) Oli Peña – TCU
- (United States) Abbey Burdette – Tennessee
- (United States) Cariel Ellis – Tennessee
- (United States) Jordan Fusco – Tennessee
- (United States) Alyssa Moore – UC Irvine
- (Canada) Simi Awujo – USC
- (Mexico) Aaliyah Farmer – USC
- (United States) Simone Jackson – USC
- (United States) Sarah Brunner – Virginia
- (United States) Kira Maguire – Virginia
- (United States) Alexis Theoret – Virginia
- (United States) Sydney Zandi – Virginia
- (United States) Emily Gray – Virginia Tech
- (United States) Tori Powell – Virginia Tech
- (United States) Emma Steigerwald – Virginia Tech
- (United States) Grayson Lynch – Washington State
- (United States) Sydney Pulver – Washington State
- (United States) Marin Whieldon – Washington State
- (Iceland) Hulda Arnarsdottir – Wake Forest
- (United States) Sofia Rossi – Wake Forest
- (Jamaica) Shayla Smart – Wake Forest
- (United States) Emma Jaskaniec – Wisconsin
- (United States) Izzy Verdugo – Wisconsin
- (United States) Joyelle Washington – Wisconsin

1 own goal

- High Point (against Virginia)
- New Mexico (against BYU)
- Prairie View A&M (against TCU)
- Wake Forest (against Michigan)
