= Cornell Apartments =

Historic building in Salt Lake City, Utah, U.S.

- U.S. National Register of Historic Places
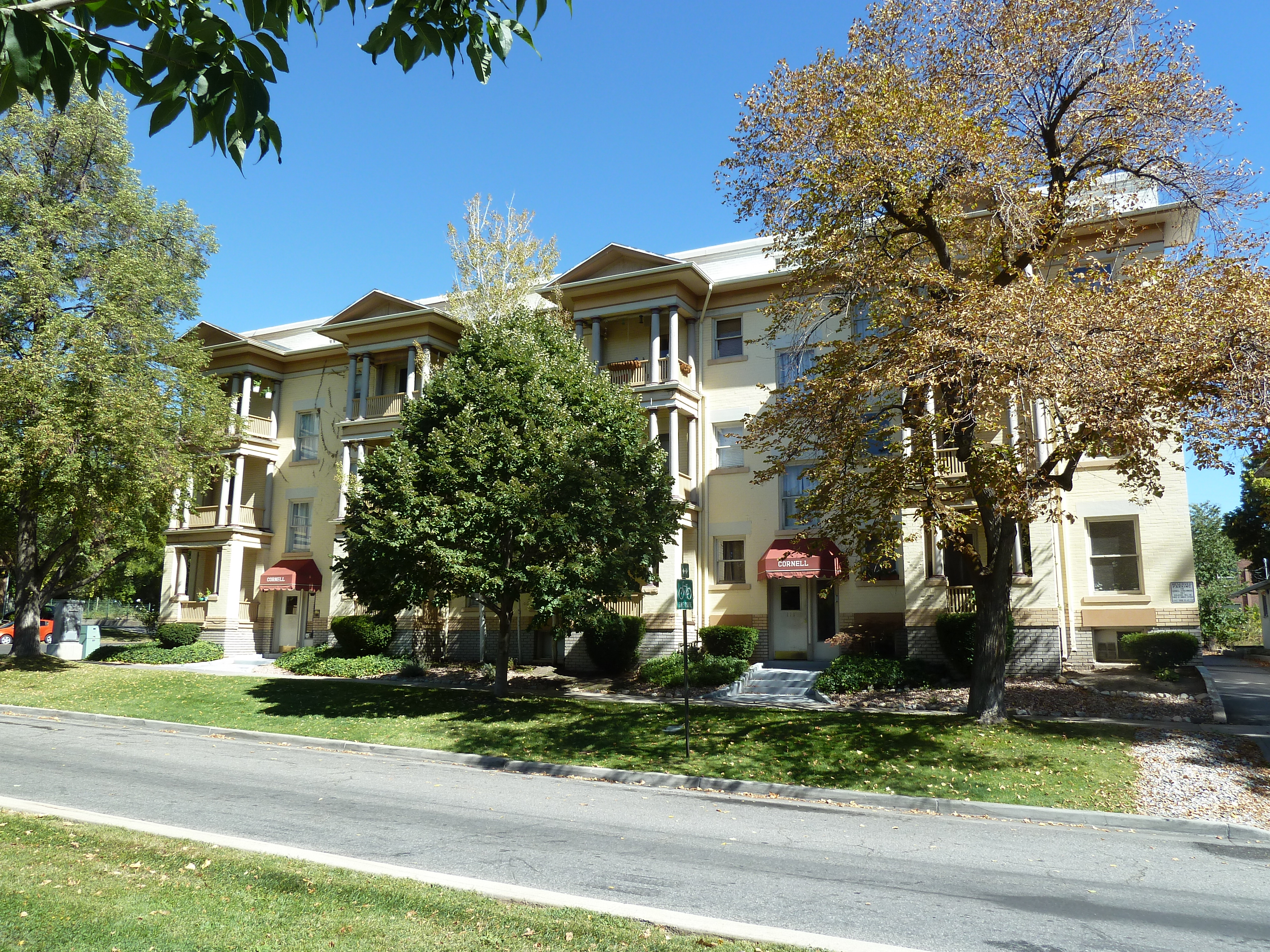
- The building in 2014

- Location within Utah Location within the United States
- Location: 101 South 600 East, Salt Lake City, Utah
- Coordinates: 40°46′01″N 111°52′08″W
- Area: less than one acre
- Built: 1910
- Built by: W.C.A. Vissing
- Architectural style: Colonial Revival, Classical Revival
- MPS: Salt Lake City MPS
- NRHP reference No.: 89001741
- Added to NRHP: October 20, 1989

Cornell Apartments is a historic three-story building in Salt Lake City, Utah. It was built in 1910 by W.C.A. Vissing, an immigrant from Denmark who became "one of the most active developers of apartment buildings in Salt Lake City during the pre-World War I period". It was designed in the Colonial Revival and Classical Revival styles. Vissing sold the building to Blanche Castleman in 1912, and it belonged to the Bergerman family from 1923 to 1934. It has been listed on the National Register of Historic Places since October 20, 1989.

== See also ==
- Cluff Apartments, also built by Vissing and listed on the National Register
