= Harvey H. Cluff =

Harvey Harris Cluff
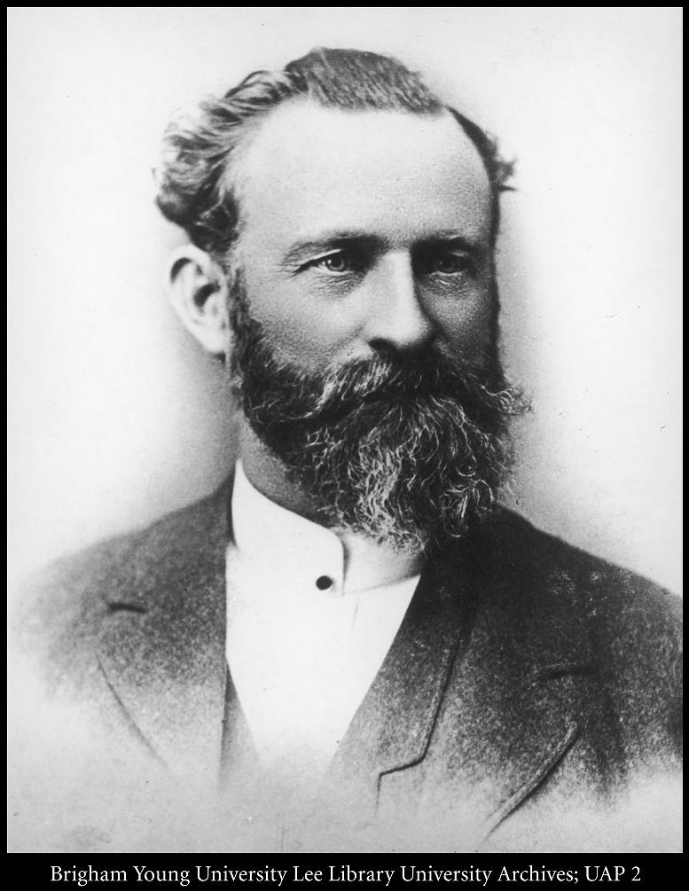
- Harvey H. Cluff, c. 1880
- Born: January 9, 1836; Kirtland, Ohio
- Died: April 19, 1916; Salt Lake City, Utah
- Spouse: Margaret Ann Foster

Harvey Harris Cluff (January 9, 1836 – April 19,1916) was a business, civic and educational leader in late-19th-century Provo, Utah.

== Early life and marriage ==
Cluff was born in Kirtland, Ohio on January 9, 1836, to David Cluff senior and his wife Elizabeth (Betsy) Hall. Cluff was the seventh of twelve children. David Cluff went to Kirtland to learn more of the Church of Jesus Christ of Latter Day Saints and meet with Joseph Smith, Jr. After converting to the church, David Cluff and his family moved to Kirtland. The family later moved to Jackson County, Missouri; Springfield, Illinois and then in 1840 to Nauvoo, Illinois. He was a Mormon pioneer and settled in Utah Territory; his family traveled with the Edward Hunter Company. They left Nauvoo in 1846 and stopped in Mt. Pisgah in Iowa for two years before settling in Provo in 1850.

In 1856, Cluff volunteered to help rescue stranded handcart pioneers. He married Margaret Ann Foster on January 24, 1857. They were the parents of three sons and a daughter, all of whom died as children. In 1877 Cluff began the practice of plural marriage. In 1887 he was arrested on charges of unlawful cohabitation and eventually served six months in prison. The house he had built in 1877 is on the National Register of Historic Places.

== Missionary work ==
From 1865 to 1868, Cluff served as a Mormon missionary in the United Kingdom, spending part of this time as district president in Glasgow. He then was in charge of a group of Latter-day Saints crossing the Atlantic Ocean. Cluff served as a missionary from 1869 to 1874 in the Hawaiian Islands, accompanied by his wife, Margaret Ann Foster. From 1879 to 1882 Cluff returned to Hawaii and served as president of the LDS Church's Hawaiian Mission, with Margaret again accompanying him. The LDS Church was respected enough that King David Kalākaua the reigning monarch of Hawaii at the time, attended the corner stone ceremonies for a new meetinghouse. Cluff was the president of the Hawaiian Latter-day Saints colony in Iosepa, Utah from 1889 until 1890, and from 1892 until March 1901.

== Civic, church, and business leadership ==
Cluff served in the Nauvoo Legion during the Utah War. He later headed the Provo Lumber and Manufacturing Company. During the 1850s and 1860s Cluff served three terms on the Provo City Council. In 1860 he, along with four of his brothers, established a dance hall and theatre in Provo. Cluff took the lead role in many of their theatrical productions.

In 1882, Cluff became the manager of the Provo Lumber and Building Company and a superintendent of the construction of the Provo Tabernacle. He was director of the First National Bank of Provo, the Provo Co-op Institution, and the Church association of Utah Stake. He also was superintendent for the construction of the Academy Building for Brigham Young Academy, completed by 1889. Harvey Cluff took out a loan of $25,000 to help finance the building. In 1893, Abraham O. Smoot sued Cluff to repay the loan, bringing the matter to church courts. Smoot's counselors requested to avoid the dispute. Smoot died in 1895.

Cluff was one of the original members of the board of trustees and treasurer of Brigham Young Academy. His term of service on the BYA board of trustees was from 1875 to 1897. Cluff was the uncle of Benjamin Cluff, who became the first president of Brigham Young University.

From 1875 to 1877 Cluff was the bishop of the Provo 4th Ward. He then served as a second counselor in the Utah Stake Presidency (then comprising all of Utah County) to from 1877 to 1892 under Abraham Smoot.
