= Mikayla Cluff =

American soccer player (born 1999)

Personal information
- Full name: Mikayla Shae Cluff
- Birth name: Mikayla Shae Colohan
- Date of birth: February 25, 1999 (age 27)
- Place of birth: Kaysville, Utah, United States
- Height: 5 ft 8 in (1.73 m)
- Position: Midfielder

Youth career
- 2010–2017: La Roca

College career
Years	Team	Apps	(Gls)
2017–2021	BYU Cougars	93	(53)

Senior career*
Years	Team	Apps	(Gls)
2019	Utah Royals FC Reserves	9	(6)
2022–2023	Orlando Pride	50	(4)
2024–2025	Utah Royals	18	(0)
2025	Seattle Reign	0	(0)

International career
2016	United States U17		
2022	United States U23		
- * Club domestic league appearances and goals as of September 6, 2025

Mikayla Shae Cluff (née Colohan; born February 25, 1999) is an American former professional soccer player who played as a midfielder in the National Women's Soccer League (NWSL) for four seasons. She played college soccer for the BYU Cougars and became one of the most decorated players in program history. She was a three-time first-team All-American and three-time West Coast Conference (WCC) Player of the Year. She was named the TopDrawerSoccer National Player of the Year after leading the Cougars to their first national title game appearance in 2021. She was drafted by the Orlando Pride in the second round of the 2021 NWSL Draft and also played for the Utah Royals and Seattle Reign FC.

== Early life ==
Born in Kaysville, Utah, Cluff played four years of soccer at Davis High School, setting a new Utah high school assists record twice as the school won three straight state championships and Cluff was named to the All-State first team each year from 2014 to 2016. She played club soccer for La Roca Futbol Club for seven years and captained the Olympic Development Program Region IV team in 2015. She also grew up playing basketball and admitted that although she was better at it, felt soccer provided more of a challenge.

== College career ==
Cluff played five seasons of college soccer at Brigham Young University between 2017 and 2021 while also earning a degree in exercise and wellness. As a freshman she registered an assist against Penn State on her Cougars debut. At the first home opener she suffered an injury. She considered a medical red shirt but elected to return for conference play and ended her first year with three goals and five assists in 11 appearances, and was named to the All-West Coast Conference Freshman Team.

Starting all 19 games as a sophomore, Cluff totaled five goals and led the team with seven assists as BYU claimed the West Coast Conference (WCC) regular season title. At the end of the season Cluff was named to the 2018 All-WCC first team as well as the United Soccer Coaches All-West Region first team and All-America second team.

In 2019, she once again started every game, scored 16 goals and tallied a further seven assists as BYU defended the regular season title and reached the NCAA Elite 8 for only the third time in program history. Individually Cluff was named 2019 WCC Player of the Year, ranked fifth nationally in the TopDrawerSoccer Top 100, and earned United Soccer Coaches All-America first team honors for the first time. She also earned All-WCC first team honors for a second time.

Cluff elected to delay her pro career and return for the delayed 2020–21 season despite being drafted in January 2021, following the NCAA's offer of a waiver in light of the COVID-19 pandemic that meant drafted players could retain college eligibility. She started in all 16 games, scoring 11 goals including tying the program record nine-game scoring streak as the Cougars finished second in the WCC behind Santa Clara Broncos. Individually, Cluff was an All-WCC first team selection for the third time, earned her second United Soccer Coaches All-America first team selection, ranked #2 nationally in the TopDrawerSoccer Top 100 behind Kelsey Turnbow, and retained her WCC Offensive Player of the Year title (the award split from player of the year to offensive and defensive player ahead of the 2020–21 season).

A few weeks before the season was supposed to start I told her I was questioning my decision of coming back to BYU. She was like, 'Kayla, you can take us to the national championship. You have an opportunity to win a national championship or do something that no one's ever done at BYU.' That was everything that I needed to hear and everything that I wanted to play for.

— Cluff on head coach Jennifer Rockwood's influence.

With the previous season not counting towards a year of eligibility, Cluff returned for a fifth and final season with BYU in fall of 2021 following discussions with head coach Jennifer Rockwood. For the fourth consecutive season, Cluff started every BYU game. She scored a career-high 18 goals and registered a career-high 15 assists as the Cougars regained the WCC title and made a run to the National Championship game for the first time in program history. The final finished goalless and went to a penalty shootout. Cluff took BYU's opening kick and scored but Florida State Seminoles won 4–3. Individually she earned All-WCC first team honors for a fourth consecutive year, a third United Soccer Coaches All-America first team selection and was named WCC Offensive Player of the Year again matching only Mandy Clemens (1997–99) and Christine Sinclair (2002, 2004, 2005) as a three-time WCC Player of the Year. She was also named NCCA Women's Division I Player of the Year on TopDrawerSoccer's Top 100 and was one of three MAC Hermann Trophy finalists, eventually losing out to Jaelin Howell. Cluff departed as the second-highest goalscorer in BYU women's soccer history with 53 behind Shauna Rohbock who scored 94 goals (1995–98).

== Club career ==
=== Utah Royals Reserves ===
In the 2019 college offseason, Cluff played for Utah Royals FC Reserves in their inaugural WPSL season. The team topped the Central Region Conference and progressed to the playoffs. Cluff scored both goals during a 2–1 victory over Fortuna Tulsa in the semi-finals and scored again in the Championship game as Utah lost 4–3 to Pensacola FC. In total, Cluff scored eight goals in 12 appearances.

=== Orlando Pride ===
On January 13, 2021, Cluff was selected in the second round (14th overall) of the 2021 NWSL Draft by Orlando Pride. Despite not declaring, a rule change amid the COVID-19 pandemic meant that any player that had exhausted three years of college eligibility could be selected. Having returned to BYU for the 2021 NCAA college soccer season, Cluff signed a two-year contract with Orlando ahead of the 2022 season on January 26, 2022. She made her professional debut on March 19, 2022, starting in the season opener against Washington Spirit in the 2022 NWSL Challenge Cup. She scored her first NWSL goal on May 18, 2022, against the North Carolina Courage.

=== Utah Royals ===
On November 15, 2023, it was announced Orlando had traded Cluff to Utah Royals along with the no. 26 overall selection in the 2024 NWSL Draft in exchange for expansion draft protection from Utah Royals and $90,000 in allocation money. Cluff parted ways with the Royals on September 6, 2025, agreeing on a mutual contract termination with the club.

=== Seattle Reign ===
Cluff joined Seattle Reign FC through the end of 2025 on the same day of her departure from Utah. She did not make an appearance for Seattle before departing from the Reign upon the expiration of her contract.

On January 25, 2026, Cluff announced her retirement from professional soccer after four years in the NWSL.

== International career ==
In April 2016, Cluff was named to a 26-player squad for the United States under-17 training camp held at the U.S. Soccer National Training Center in Carson, California. In January 2022, Cluff was named to an 18-player under-23 training camp held in Austin, Texas and including a closed-doors scrimmage against the senior national team.

== Personal life ==
Cluff is the cousin of former United States youth international and BYU Cougars soccer player Cloee Colohan. Like Cluff, Colohan was also drafted into the NWSL, 14th overall in 2014.

On January 7, 2022, she married professional baseball player Jackson Cluff in a ceremony at the Draper Utah Temple. The pair met while both studying at Brigham Young University.

== Career statistics ==
=== College summary ===
Team	Season	Total		
Team	Season	Division	Apps	Goals
BYU Cougars	2017	Div. I	11	3
BYU Cougars	2018	Div. I	19	5
BYU Cougars	2019	Div. I	23	16
BYU Cougars	2020–21	Div. I	16	11
BYU Cougars	2021	Div. I	24	18
Total			93	53

=== Club summary ===
As of match played October 15, 2023.

Club	Season	League			Cup (Note: NWSL Challenge Cup)		Playoffs		Total	
Club	Season	Division	Apps	Goals	Apps	Goals	Apps	Goals	Apps	Goals
Utah Royals FC Reserves	2019	WPSL	9	6	—		3	2	12	8
Orlando Pride	2022	NWSL	25	2	6	0	—		24	2
Orlando Pride	2023	NWSL	25	2	5	0	—		27	2
Orlando Pride	Total		50	4	11	0	0	0	61	4
Career total			59	10	11	0	3	2	63	12

== Honors ==
BYU Cougars

- West Coast Conference: 2018, 2019, 2021
- NCAA Women's College Cup runner-up: 2021

Individual

- West Coast Conference Player of the Year: 2019, 2020, 2021
- United Soccer Coaches First Team All-America: 2019, 2020, 2021
- TopDrawerSoccer NCCA Women's Division I Player of the Year: 2021
