= Clough, South Dakota =

Extinct town in South Dakota, United States

Coordinates: 44°34′45″N 102°48′17″W

Clough is an extinct town in Meade County, in the U.S. state of South Dakota. The GNIS classifies it as a populated place.

== History ==
Clough was laid out in 1910, and named after the father of a first settler. A post office called Clough was established in 1909, and remained in operation until 1943.
