= Cluff Apartments =

Historic building in Salt Lake City, Utah, U.S.

- U.S. National Register of Historic Places
- U.S. Historic district – Contributing property
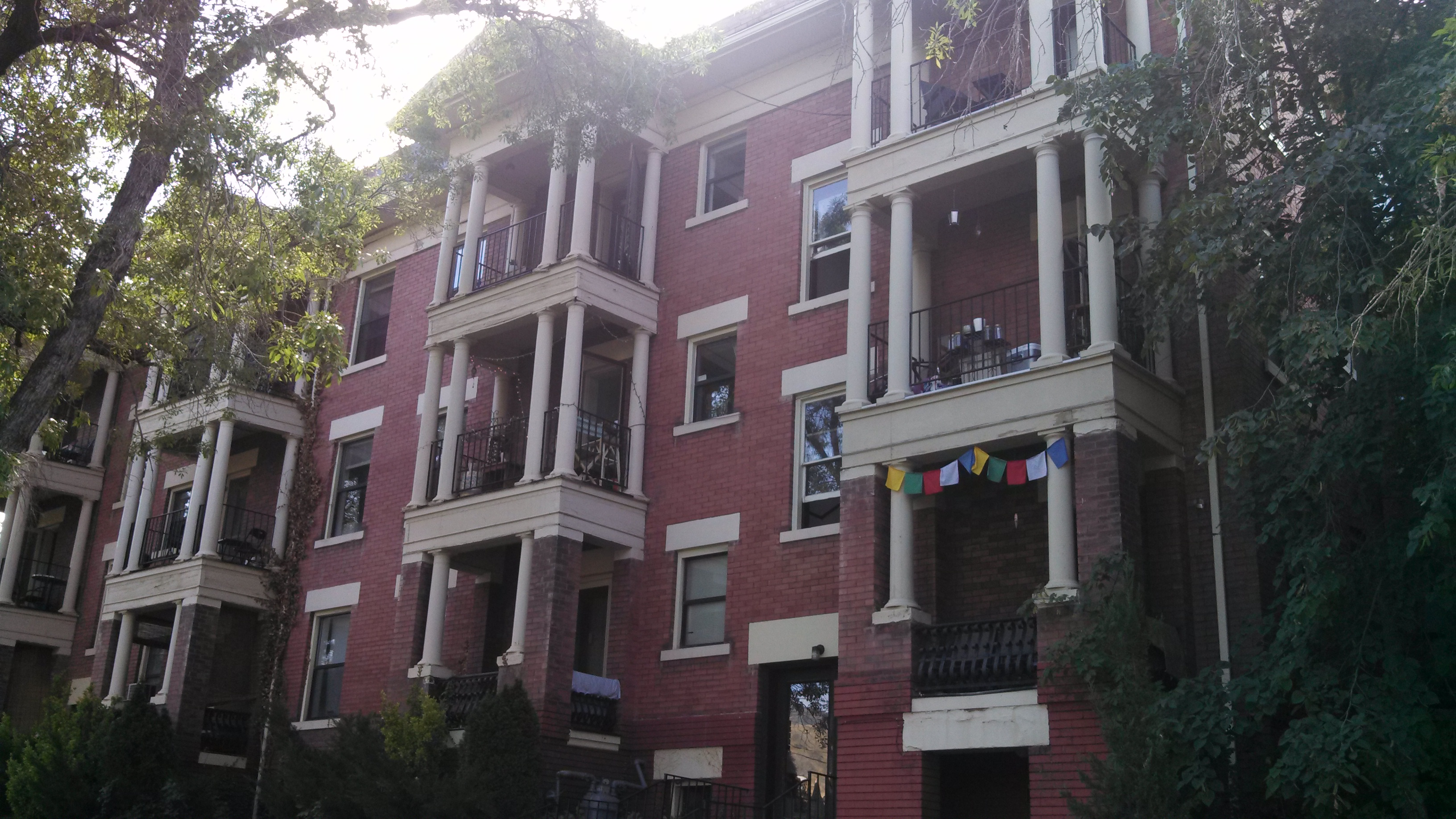
- Cluff Apartments, September 2013

- Location within Utah Location within the United States
- Location: 1270--1280 East 200 South; Salt Lake City, Utah; United States
- Coordinates: 40°45′53″N 111°51′12″W
- Area: less than one acre
- Built: 1911
- Built by: W.C.A. Vissing
- Architectural style: Colonial Revival, Classical Revival
- Part of: University Neighborhood Historic District (ID95001430)
- MPS: Salt Lake City MPS
- NRHP reference No.: 89001739

Significant dates
- Added to NRHP: October 20, 1989
- Designated CP: December 13, 1995

Cluff Apartments, also known as Bennett Apartments and Hillview Apartments, is a historic building in northeastern Salt Lake City, Utah, United States, that is located within the University Neighborhood Historic District, but is individually listed on the National Register of Historic Places (NRHP).

== Description ==
The building was constructed in 1911 for the Cluff Investment Company by W.C.A. Vissing, "one of the most active developers of apartment buildings in Salt Lake City during the pre-World War I period", and designed in the Colonial Revival and Classical Revival styles. It was renamed Bennett Apartments in 1936, twelve years after it was acquired by William H. Bennett and his wife Jennie, and Hillview Apartments in 1947. It has been listed on the National Register of Historic Places since October 20, 1989.

Vissing also was involved with the Cornell Apartments, which are also National Register-listed.

== See also ==
- National Register of Historic Places listings in Salt Lake City
