= Harvey H. Cluff House =

Historic house in Utah, United States

- U.S. National Register of Historic Places
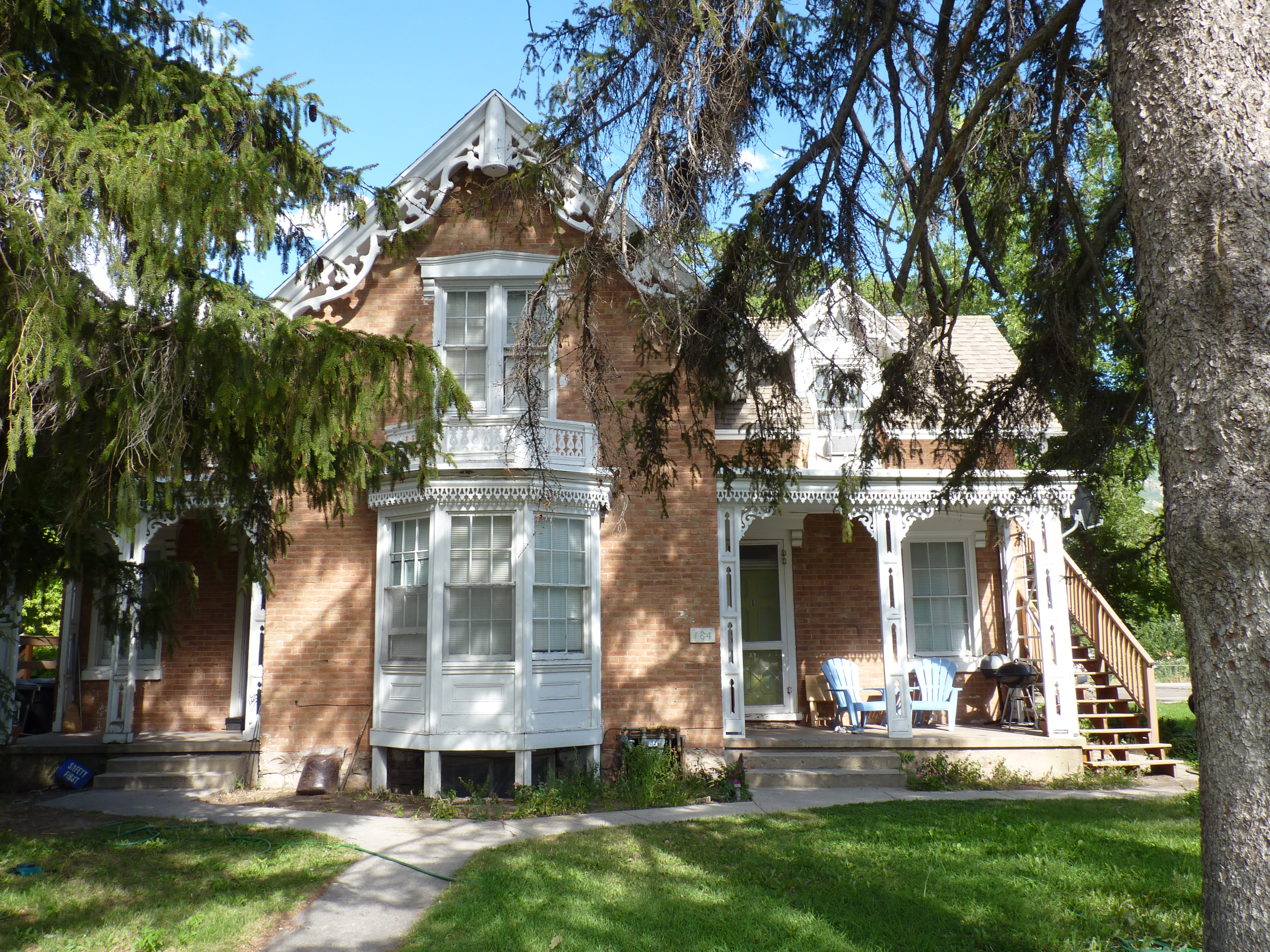
- Harvey H. Cluff House

- Location within Utah Location within the United States
- Location: 174 N. 100 East, Provo, Utah
- Coordinates: 40°14′10″N 111°39′21″W
- Area: less than one acre
- Built: 1877
- Architectural style: Gothic Revival
- NRHP reference No.: 82004172
- Added to NRHP: August 4, 1982

The Harvey H. Cluff house is a house in central Provo, Utah, United States, built in 1877 that is on the National Register of Historic Places. It was originally owned by Harvey H. Cluff.

== Harvey Harris Cluff House * 184 North 100 East * Provo, Utah ==
The Harvey Harris Cluff House was built in 1877 by John Watkins of Midway, Utah, an architect and builder of that era and friend of Cluff. Inspired by the Greek Revival movement of the early 1800s, this type of architecture is often called a “temple-form” house because early examples had a colossal temple front. The Harvey Harris Cluff House was designated to the Provo City Historic Landmarks Registry on May 22, 1996.

=== Structure ===
The temple form is often referred to as being part of Greek revival architecture, however when it expanded to Utah it had some Gothic Revival attributes. Features of gothic architecture included in this form as apparent in Utah are: A steeper pitch to the roof, wall dormers, finials, bargeboards, and frame bay windows. There have been approximately six Gothic temple-form houses recorded in Utah, and this home stands as a historical representative of this style.

=== Harvey Harris Cluff ===
Born in 1836 to David & Elizabeth (Betsy) Hall Cluff in Kirkland, Ohio, Harvey Harris Cluff and his family settled in Provo, Utah in the year 1850. In the late 1850s, Cluff and his brothers built a furniture factory. Later, due to the experience he had gained at the factory, he was charged to be superintendent of the construction of important historical buildings such as the Provo Tabernacle and the Academy Building of Brigham Young Academy. Cluff also had the opportunity to serve as president of the company which published the local newspaper, The Enquirer, to serve as a director of the First National Bank in Provo, and to serve as President of the Provo Foundry and Machine Company.

Also highly participatory in community affairs, Harvey Harris Cluff served in the city council. An important leader within the Mormon faith, he held numerous leadership responsibilities, such as a counselor in the Utah Stake Presidency, the bishop of the Provo Fourth Ward, and a mission president of the Sandwich Islands. Cluff relocated to Salt Lake City in about 1915, after which he sold his home to a man by the name of W. Ray Ashworth, a carpenter. The Ashworth family retained the home until 1974, when the title passed to Willard C. Nelson.

The house was listed on the National Register of Historic Places in 1982.
