= Jaelin Howell =

American soccer player (born 1999)

- Howell with Gotham FC in 2026

Personal information
- Full name: Jaelin Marie Howell
- Date of birth: November 21, 1999 (age 26)
- Place of birth: Windsor, Colorado, United States
- Height: 5 ft 7 in (1.70 m)
- Position: Midfielder

Team information
- Current team: Gotham FC
- Number: 7

Youth career
- Real Colorado

College career
| Years | Team | Apps | (Gls) |
| 2018–2021 | Florida State Seminoles | 90 | (10) |

Senior career*
| Years | Team | Apps | (Gls) |
| 2022–2024 | Racing Louisville | 50 | (0) |
| 2024 | Seattle Reign | 8 | (0) |
| 2025– | Gotham FC | 55 | (4) |

International career^{‡}
| 2015–2016 | United States U17 | 21 | (1) |
| 2017–2018 | United States U20 | 26 | (2) |
| 2020– | United States | 7 | (1) |
- * Club domestic league appearances and goals as of November 1, 2026 ‡ National team caps and goals as of October 13, 2026

Jaelin Marie Howell (born November 21, 1999) is an American professional soccer player who plays as a midfielder for Gotham FC of the National Women's Soccer League (NWSL) and the United States national team. She played college soccer for the Florida State Seminoles, winning the Hermann Trophy in two consecutive seasons (2020 and 2021). She won national championships in 2018 and 2021.

Racing Louisville selected Howell second overall in the 2022 NWSL Draft, and she became Racing's captain the following year. In 2024, she was traded midseason to the Seattle Reign. She then joined Gotham and won the 2025 NWSL Championship in her first season with the Bats.

After playing at the under-17 and under-20 levels, Howell made her senior debut for the United States in 2020.

== Early life and college career ==
Howell played youth club soccer for Real Colorado and attended Fossil Ridge High School in Fort Collins, Colorado. She was named an NSCAA All-American in 2015. Howell was youth club and high school teammates with USWNT teammate Sophia Wilson

Howell played college soccer for Florida State Seminoles. She was awarded the Hermann Trophy in 2020, honoring the United Soccer Coaches National Players of the Year in NCAA Division I women's soccer. She again won the Hermann Trophy in 2021 for the second consecutive season.

== Club career ==
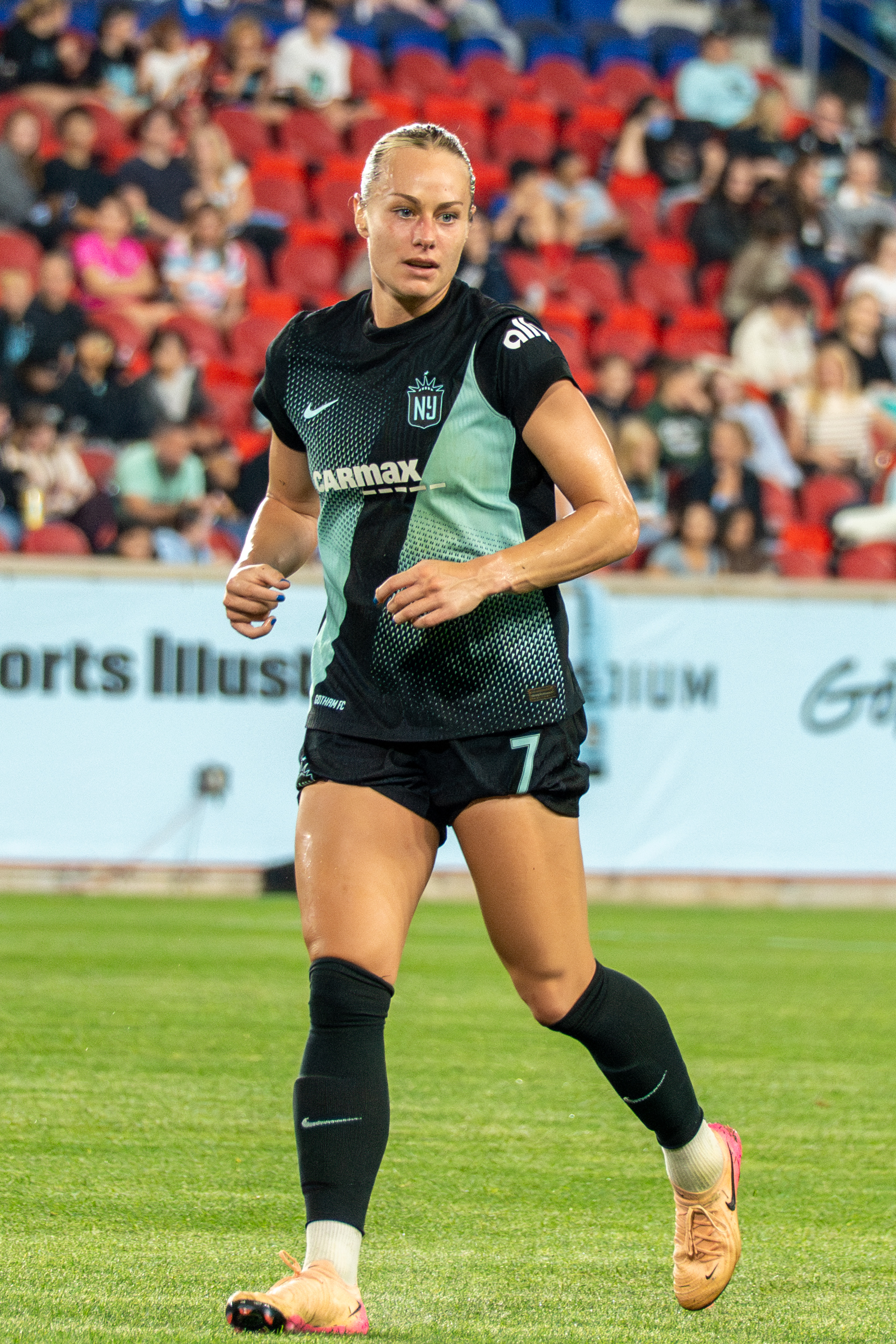
Howell playing for Gotham FC in 2025

On January 21, 2022, Howell signed a three-year contract with Racing Louisville FC after being selected second by the team in the 2022 NWSL Draft.

Howell made her Racing Louisville debut on March 18 in the NWSL Challenge Cup opener, starting in midfield against the Kansas City Current. The midfielder was second in the NWSL in minutes played last season among rookies, only trailing her Racing teammate Savannah DeMelo. Howell had two assists for the year.

Howell was named Racing's captain before the 2023 season.

On August 19, 2024, Howell was traded to Seattle Reign FC along with $50,000 in allocation money in exchange for Bethany Balcer. She made her debut for Seattle against North Carolina Courage on August 25, 2024 as she was substituted on in the 75th minute.

On December 20, 2024, Howell joined Gotham FC as part of a trade that also saw Cassie Miller and Lynn Williams move to Seattle. On May 25, 2025, she started in the 2025 CONCACAF W Champions Cup final against Tigres, where Gotham won 1–0 to become the inaugural winners of the competition.

In 2026, Howell became the first Gotham FC player to start 30 regular-season matches in a single season and set a club record for most minutes played in a regular season, with 2,593 minutes.

== International career ==
Howell was named to the 2016 CONCACAF Women's U-17 Championship Best XI. The same year, she was the starting center midfielder for the U-17 team at the 2016 FIFA U-17 Women's World Cup. On March 29, 2017, she was called up to the U.S. women's national soccer team.

After being a part of the USA U-20 Squad that finished runner up at the 2018 CONCACAF Women's U-20 Championship, Howell was named to the USA U-20 roster for the 2018 FIFA U-20 Women's World Cup.

She made her debut for the United States November 27, 2020, coming on as a substitute for Sam Mewis in the 89th minute against the Netherlands.

Howell scored her first senior national team goal in a 9–1 win over Uzbekistan.

== Personal life ==
Jaelin's father, John, was an NFL safety who was part of the Tampa Bay Buccaneers team that won Super Bowl XXXVII.

== Career statistics ==
=== Club ===
As of November 17, 2024

Appearances and goals by club, season and competition
| Club | Season | League | | | Cup (Note: Includes the NWSL Challenge Cup and the 2024 NWSL x Liga MX Femenil Summer Cup) | | Playoffs (Note: Includes NWSL Playoffs) | | Total | |
| Club | Season | Division | Apps | Goals | Apps | Goals | Apps | Goals | Apps | Goals |
|---|---|---|---|---|---|---|---|---|---|---|
| Racing Louisville FC | 2022 | NWSL | 22 | 0 | 5 | 1 | — | | 27 | 1 |
| Racing Louisville FC | 2023 | NWSL | 16 | 0 | 5 | 0 | — | | 21 | 0 |
| Racing Louisville FC | 2024 | NWSL | 12 | 0 | 3 | 0 | — | | 15 | 0 |
| Seattle Reign | 2024 | NWSL | 8 | 0 | — | | — | | 8 | 0 |
| Career total | | | 58 | 0 | 13 | 1 | 0 | 0 | 71 | 1 |

=== International ===
As of match played October 13, 2026

| National Team | Year | Apps | Goals |
|---|---|---|---|
| United States | 2020 | 1 | 0 |
| United States | 2021 | 1 | 0 |
| United States | 2022 | 3 | 1 |
| United States | 2023 | 0 | 0 |
| United States | 2024 | 0 | 0 |
| United States | 2025 | 1 | 0 |
| United States | 2026 | 1 | 0 |
| Total | | 7 | 1 |

Scores and results list United States's goal tally first, score column indicates score after each Howell goal.

List of international goals scored by Jaelin Howell
| No. | Date | Venue | Opponent | Score | Result | Competition | Ref. |
|---|---|---|---|---|---|---|---|
| 1 | April 9, 2022 | Columbus, Ohio | Uzbekistan | 7–0 | 9–1 | Friendly | |

== Honors ==
Florida State Seminoles

- NCAA Division I Women's Soccer Championship: 2018, 2021

Gotham FC

- NWSL Championship: 2025
- NWSL Shield: 2026
- NWSL Challenge Cup: 2026
- CONCACAF W Champions Cup: 2024–25

United States

- SheBelieves Cup: 2021; 2022

Individual

- Hermann Trophy: 2020, 2021
- Atlantic Coast Conference Midfielder of the Year: 2020, 2021
- NWSL Best XI First Team: 2026
