= Samantha Fisher (footballer) =

Salvadoran footballer (born 2002)

Personal information
- Full name: Samantha Tru Fisher Conde
- Date of birth: 26 August 1999 (age 27)
- Place of birth: Simi Valley, California, U.S.
- Height: 1.68 m (5 ft 6 in)
- Position: Midfielder

Team information
- Current team: Sassuolo
- Number: 11

College career
| Years | Team | Apps | (Gls) |
| 2017–2021 | Notre Dame Fighting Irish | 91 | (29) |

Senior career*
| Years | Team | Apps | (Gls) |
| 2022–2024 | Chicago Red Stars | 18 | (1) |
| 2024– | Sassuolo | 9 | (2) |

International career^{‡}
| 2024– | El Salvador | 4 | (1) |
- * Club domestic league appearances and goals as of 15 October 2023 ‡ National team caps and goals as of 28 February 2024

Samantha Tru Fisher Conde (born 26 August 1999) is a professional footballer who plays as a midfielder for Serie A club Sassuolo. Born in the United States, she is an El Salvador international.

== Early life ==
Fisher attended Grace Brethren High School in the United States. She has two older sisters.

== Career ==
Fisher is an El Salvador international. She is eligible to represent the country through her mother and grandparents.

On 19 July 2024, Fisher joined Serie A club Sassuolo.

== Personal life ==
Fisher was born in 1999 in the United States. She is a native of Simi Valley, United States.

== International goals ==
Scores and results list El Salvador's goal tally first.

| No. | Date | Venue | Opponent | Score | Result | Competition |
|---|---|---|---|---|---|---|
| 1. | 28 February 2024 | Shell Energy Stadium, Houston, United States | Paraguay | 1–1 | 2–3 | 2024 CONCACAF W Gold Cup |
| 2. | 3 June 2024 | Estadio Félix Capriles, Cochabamba, Bolivia | Bolivia | 2–0 | 2–0 | Friendly |
| 3. | 13 July 2024 | Estadio Las Delicias, Santa Tecla, El Salvador | Peru | 2–1 | 3–1 | Friendly |
| 4. | 22 February 2025 | Estadio Rodrigo Paz Delgado, Quito, Ecuador | Ecuador | 2–1 | 3–2 | Friendly |
