= Zhao Yujie =

Chinese footballer (born 1999)

Personal information
- Date of birth: 28 April 1999 (age 27)
- Place of birth: Shanghai, China
- Height: 5 ft 6 in (1.68 m)
- Position: Midfielder

Team information
- Current team: Beijing W.F.C.

Youth career
- Shanghai

College career
| Years | Team | Apps | (Gls) |
| 2018–2021 | Florida State Seminoles | 91 | (20) |

Senior career*
| Years | Team | Apps | (Gls) |
| 2022–2023 | HB Køge | 11 | (4) |

International career^{‡}
| 2015 | China U16 | | |
| 2017 | China U19 | 1 | (0) |
| 2018 | China U20 | 3 | (1) |
| 2019– | China | 1 | (0) |
- * Club domestic league appearances and goals as of 17 May 2023 ‡ National team caps and goals as of 17 November 2020

Zhao Yujie (Chinese: 赵瑜洁; born 28 April 1999) is a Chinese professional footballer currently playing as a midfielder for Beijing W.F.C.

== Club career ==
Born in Shanghai, China, Zhao represented the Shanghai under-18 side before moving to the United States to study at the Florida State University. She had a very successful career at Florida State, earning first-team All-Atlantic Coast Conference honors all four years. She started for the team in her first two seasons and helped win the NCAA tournament in 2018, when she was named the ACC and TopDrawerSoccer freshman of the year. She appeared as an early substitute throughout her last two seasons and won her second NCAA championship in 2021, being named the tournament's most outstanding offensive player.

== Career statistics ==
=== International ===
As of matches played 17 November 2020.

| National team | Year | Apps | Goals |
|---|---|---|---|
| China | 2019 | 1 | 0 |
| Total | | 1 | 0 |

== Honours ==
Florida State Seminoles

- NCAA Division I women's soccer tournament: 2018, 2021
