= 2021 Penn State Nittany Lions women's soccer team =

American college soccer season

2021 Penn State Nittany Lions women's soccer
- Conference: Big Ten Conference
- U. Soc. Coaches poll: No. 23
- TopDrawerSoccer.com: No. 24
- Record: 12–8–1 (5–5–0 Big Ten)
- Head coach: Erica Dambach (15th season)
- Assistant coaches: Ann Cook; Tim Wassell; Jack Rushworth
- Home stadium: Jeffrey Field

2021 Big Ten Conference women's soccer standings
	Conf.						Overall
Team	W		L		T	PCT	W		L		T	PCT
No. 3 Rutgers ‍†‍‍^{y}	10	–	0	–	0	1.000	19	–	3	–	2	.833
No. 24 Purdue ‍‍‍^{y}	8	–	2	–	0	.800	15	–	4	–	3	.750
No. 7 Michigan ‍‍‡‍^{y}	6	–	2	–	2	.700	18	–	4	–	3	.780
Michigan State ‍‍‍	5	–	4	–	1	.550	10	–	5	–	3	.639
Iowa ‍‍‍	5	–	4	–	1	.550	12	–	6	–	2	.650
No. 23 Penn State ‍‍‍^{y}	5	–	5	–	0	.500	12	–	8	–	1	.595
Ohio State ‍‍‍^{y}	3	–	4	–	2	.444	9	–	9	–	2	.500
Wisconsin ‍‍‍^{y}	3	–	3	–	4	.500	10	–	6	–	6	.591
Indiana ‍‍‍	3	–	4	–	3	.450	9	–	5	–	4	.611
Minnesota ‍‍‍	4	–	6	–	0	.400	8	–	6	–	3	.559
Nebraska ‍‍‍	3	–	5	–	2	.400	7	–	9	–	2	.444
Northwestern ‍‍‍	3	–	5	–	1	.389	7	–	9	–	1	.441
Illinois ‍‍‍	1	–	8	–	1	.150	5	–	11	–	1	.324
Maryland ‍‍‍	0	–	7	–	3	.150	4	–	9	–	5	.361
† – Conference champion ‡ – 2021 Big Ten Tournament champion y – Invited to the NCAA tournament As of December 7, 2021; Rankings from United Soccer Coaches Poll; Source:2021 Women's Soccer Standings

The 2021 Penn State Nittany Lions women's soccer team represented Pennsylvania State University during the 2021 NCAA Division I women's soccer season and the 2021 Big Ten Conference women's soccer season. It was the program's 28th season fielding a women's varsity soccer team, and their 28th season in the Big Ten Conference. The 2021 season is Erica Dambach's 15th year at the helm.

== Background ==
The 2021 season is the Nittany Lions' 28th season as a varsity soccer program, and their 28th season playing in the Big Ten Conference. The team is led by 15th year head coach, Erica Dambach, who had previously served as a head coach for the Harvard. Tim Wassell was promoted to associate head coach in July 2021.

Penn State was invited to compete in the 2021 NCAA tournament as an unranked seed.

== Squad ==
=== Roster ===
As of August 5, 2021

Note: Flags indicate national team as defined under FIFA eligibility rules; some limited exceptions apply. Players may hold more than one non-FIFA nationality.

No.	Pos.	Nation	Player
0	GK	USA	Katie Evans
00	GK	USA	Amanda Poorbaugh
1	GK	USA	Julia Dohle
2	MF	USA	Kerry Abello
3	MF	USA	Olivia Damico
5	MF	USA	Cori Dyke
6	DF	USA	Kate Wiesner
7	MF	USA	Jillian Jennings
8	MF	USA	Jilly Shimkin
9	FW	USA	Rachel Wasserman
10	MF	USA	Maddie Myers
12	MF	USA	Payton Linnehan
14	MF	USA	Kaitlyn MacBean
15	DF	USA	Devon Olive
16	FW	USA	Ellie Wheeler

No.	Pos.	Nation	Player
17	MF	USA	Sam Coffey
18	DF	USA	Sofia Mancino
20	FW	USA	Angela Aguero
22	MF	USA	Jordan Canniff
23	DF	ESP	Eva Alonso
24	FW	USA	Elle Kershner
25	DF	GER	Mieke Schiemann
26	GK	USA	Katherine Asman
29	DF	USA	Kara Ogden
31	MF	USA	Julia Raich
32	MF	USA	Natalie Wilson
33	DF	USA	Anna Carson
34	FW	USA	Ally Schlegel
35	MF	USA	Riley Gleason
55	GK	USA	Morgan Messner

=== Personnel ===
Front office
Athletic Director	Sandy Barbour
Deputy Director of Athletics	Lynn Holleran
Deputy Director of Athletics	Scott Sidwell
Coaching staff
Head coach	Erica Dambach
Assistant coach	Ann Cook
Assistant coach	Tim Wassell
Assistant coach	Jack Rushworth

Last updated: January 1, 2021
Source: Penn State Athletics

== Schedule ==
Date Time, TV	Rank^{#}	Opponent^{#}	Result	Record	Team events	Opponent events	Site (Attendance) City, State
Pre-season
August 19*; 7:00 p.m., BTN+	No. 10	UMass	W 3–1	1–0–0 (0–0–0)	S. Coffey 50'; A. Schlegel 56'; P. Linnehan 60'	C. Pedolzky 49'	Jeffrey Field (1777); State College, PA
August 22*; 5:00 p.m., BTN+	No. 7	La Salle	W 4–0	2–0–0 (0–0–0)	P. Linnehan 24'; P. Linnehan 26'; P. Linnehan 28'; O. Damico 36'	G. Picco (yellow card) 13'; M. McCready (yellow card) 81'	Jeffrey Field (987); State College, PA
August 29*; 2:00 p.m., BTN+	No. 7	Hofstra	W 2–1	3–0–0 (0–0–0)	P. Linnehan 3'; A. Schlegel 13'	M. Taylor 20'; Team Bench (yellow card) 20'	Jeffrey Field (1007); State College, PA
September 2; 7:00 p.m., ESPN+	No. 7	at No. 13 West Virginia	W 2–0	4–0–0 (0–0–0)	E. Wheeler 29'; K. Abello 30'; J. Shimkin (yellow card) 63'; A. Schlegel (yellow card) 87'	none	Dick Dlesk Soccer Stadium (1257); Morgantown, WV
September 5*; 6:00 p.m., ESPN+	No. 7	at No. 18 University of Central Florida	L 2–1	4–1–0 (0–0–0)	M. Myers (yellow card) 24'; S. Coffey 29'; Bench (yellow card) 75'	K. Scott 25'; K. Scott 61'; K. Scott (yellow card) 73'; D. Martin (yellow card) 73'	UCF Soccer and Track Stadium (524); Orlando, FL
September 9*; 8:00 p.m., ACC Network	No. 14	at No. 3 Virginia	W 4–2	5–1–0 (0–0–0)	S. Coffey 24'; P. Linnehan 38'; A. Schlegel 39'; A. Schlegel 61'	D. Ordonez 26'; D. Ordonez 57'	Klöckner Stadium (1559); Charlottesville, VA
September 12*; 3:00 p.m.	No. 14	vs. NC State	W 1–0	6–1–0 (0–0–0)	C. Dyke (yellow card) 79'; S. Coffey 89'	none	Klöckner Stadium (53); Charlottesville, VA
Regular season
September 19; 12:00 p.m., BTN	No. 8	at No. 16 Rutgers	L 2–1	6–2–0 (0–1–0)	R. Wasserman 67'	S. Kroeger 62'; B. Fluchel 80'	Yurcak Field (1854); Piscataway, NJ
September 23; 7:00 p.m., BTN+	No. 12	Northwestern	L 2–1	6–3–0 (0–2–0)	C. Dyke (yellow card) 50'; K. Abello 80'	K. Titus 10'; J. Aulicino 36'	Jeffrey Field (652); State College, PA
September 26; 3:00 p.m., BTN+	No. 12	Ohio State	L 1–0	6–4–0 (0–3–0)	none	I. Rodriguez 65'	Jeffrey Field (892); State College, PA
September 30; 3:00 p.m., BTN		at No. 18 Wisconsin	W 2–1	7–4–0 (1–3–0)	S. Coffey 30'; J. Canniff 80'	E. Jaskaniec 12'; M. Monticello (yellow card) 30'	McClimon Soccer Complex (0); Madison, WI
October 3; 1:00 p.m., BTN+		at Minnesota	L 4–1	7–5–0 (1–4–0)	R. Gleason 89'	P. Ward 9'; I. Brown 24'; M. Buisman 57'; Team 73'	Elizabeth Lyle Robbie Stadium (1311); Falcon Heights, MN
October 10; 6:00 p.m., BTN+		Maryland	W 5–1	8–5–0 (2–4–0)	S. Coffey 18'; S. Coffey 27'; S. Coffey 39' r. Wasserman 47'; A. Schlegel 52'; M. Schiemann (yellow card) 68'	M. Dates 18'	Jeffrey Field (1000); State College, PA
October 14; 7:00 p.m., ESPNU		Indiana	W 3–0	9–5–0 (3–4–0)	J. Canniff 40'; R. Gleason (yellow card) 41'; S. Coffey 54'; J. Canniff 65'	A. Kalin (yellow card) 8'	Jeffrey Field (548); State College, PA
October 17; 3:30 p.m., BTN+		No. 19 Purdue	W 2–1	10–5–0 (4–4–0)	J. Canniff 61'; A. Schlegel 77'	Sarah Griffith 57'	Jeffrey Field (1931); State College, PA
October 21; 7:00 p.m., FS1	No. 24	at Michigan	L 2–0	10–6–0 (4–5–0)	none	R. Loughman 17'; S. Shepherd (yellow card) 27'; D. Wolfe 84'	U-M Soccer Stadium (1133); Ann Arbor, MI
October 24; 1:00 p.m., BTN+	No. 24	at Michigan State	W 2–1	11–6–0 (5–5–0)	A. Schlegel 78'; E. Wheeler 83'	C. Evans 78'	DeMartin Soccer Complex (1242); East Lansing, MI
Big Ten Tournament
October 31; 1:00 p.m., BTN+	No. (6)	at No. 17 (3) Michigan; First Round	L 3–1	11–7–0 (5–5–0)	A. Schlegel 85'	N. Hernandez 9'; R. Loughman 20'; K. Lawrence 20'	U-M Soccer Stadium (801); Ann Arbor, MI
NCAA Tournament
November 12*; 6:00 p.m.		Monmouth University; First Round	W 3–1	12–7–0 (5–5–0)	A. Schlegel 25'; P. Linnehan 38'; R. Wasserman 74'	R. Ludwick 77'	Jeffrey Field (521); State College, PA
November 19*; 4:30 p.m., Pac-12 Network		at No. 11 USC; Round of 32	T 2–2 ^{5–3 PK}	12–7–1 (5–5–0)	A. Schlegel 20'; A. Schlegel 56'	P. Hocking 48'; S. Jackson 85'	McAlister Field (897); Los Angeles, CA
November 21*; 3:00 p.m., Pac-12 Network		vs. South Carolina; Sweet Sixteen	L 2–0	12–8–1 (5–5–0)	none	S. Chang 25'; L. Zullo 55'	McAlister Field (219); Los Angeles, CA
*Non-conference game. ^{#}Rankings from United Soccer Coaches. (#) Tournament seedings in parentheses.

Source:Penn State Athletics

== Rankings ==
=== Preseason Big Ten poll ===
Penn State was predicted to finish 1st in the Big Ten Conference.

Coaches' Poll
Predicted finish	Team
1	Penn State
2	Rutgers
3	Ohio State
4	Michigan
5	Wisconsin
6	Indiana
7	Iowa
7	Northwestern
9	Illinois
10	Minnesota
11	Purdue
12	Nebraska
13	Michigan State
14	Maryland

=== Season rankings ===
Ranking movements Legend: ██ Increase in ranking ██ Decrease in ranking — = Not ranked RV = Received votes
	Week													
Poll	Pre	1	2	3	4	5	6	7	8	9	10	11	12	Final
United Soccer	10	7	7	14	8	12	RV	RV	—	24	RV	RV	RV	23
Top Drawer Soccer	20	13	11	11	6	9	23	—	—	—	—	—	—	24
CollegeSoccerNews.com	10	9	7	8	6	11	25	RV	RV	—	—			
