= 2019 Big Ten women's soccer tournament =

- Classification: Division I
- Teams: 8
- Matches: 7
- Site: Yurcak Field; Piscataway, New Jersey (Semifinals and Final)
- Champions: Penn State (8th title)
- Winning coach: Erica Dambach (4th title)
- MVP: Payton Linnehan (Offensive); Amanda Dennis (Defensive) (Penn State)
- Broadcast: BTN

2019 Big Ten Conference women's soccer standings
	Conf.						Overall
Team	W		L		T	PCT	W		L		T	PCT
No. 10 Wisconsin ‍†‍‍^{y}	10	–	0	–	1	.955	16	–	4	–	2	.773
Rutgers ‍‍‍^{y}	8	–	2	–	1	.773	15	–	4	–	2	.762
No. 15 Michigan ‍‍‍^{y}	8	–	2	–	1	.773	17	–	6	–	1	.729
No. 13 Penn St ‍‍‡‍^{y}	8	–	3	–	0	.727	17	–	7	–	1	.700
Iowa ‍‍‍^{y}	7	–	3	–	1	.682	15	–	5	–	1	.738
Maryland ‍‍‍	5	–	5	–	1	.500	9	–	8	–	3	.525
Indiana ‍‍‍	4	–	5	–	2	.455	8	–	9	–	2	.474
Purdue ‍‍‍	3	–	6	–	2	.364	8	–	9	–	3	.475
Northwestern ‍‍‍	3	–	6	–	2	.364	5	–	10	–	3	.361
Nebraska ‍‍‍	3	–	6	–	2	.364	4	–	10	–	4	.333
Illinois ‍‍‍	3	–	7	–	1	.318	9	–	8	–	1	.528
Ohio St ‍‍‍	2	–	6	–	3	.318	4	–	10	–	4	.333
Minnesota ‍‍‍	2	–	7	–	2	.273	3	–	12	–	4	.263
Michigan St ‍‍‍	1	–	9	–	1	.136	8	–	10	–	1	.447
† – Conference champion ‡ – 2019 Big Ten Tournament champion y – Invited to the NCAA tournament As of December 10, 2019; Rankings from United Soccer Coaches Poll; Source:The Big Ten Conference

The 2019 Big Ten Conference women's soccer tournament is the postseason women's soccer tournament for the Big Ten Conference for the 2019 season. It was held from November 3–10, 2019. The seven-match tournament began with first-round matches held at campus sites, before moving to Yurcak Field in Piscataway, New Jersey for the semifinals and final. The eight-team single-elimination tournament consisted of three rounds based on seeding from regular-season conference play. The defending tournament champion, Minnesota, did not qualify for this year's tournament. Penn State beat Michigan in the tournament championship game in overtime 2–1. Penn State is the Big Ten Tournament Champion. It was just the sixth Big Ten final to go to overtime (first since 2018).

== Seeds ==
Eight Big Ten schools participated in the tournament. Teams were seeded by conference record.

Seed	School	Conference record							
Seed	School	Pld.	W	L	T	GF	GA	GD	Pts.
1	Wisconsin	11	10	0	1	20	5	+15	31
2	Rutgers	11	8	2	1	17	9	+8	25
3	Michigan	11	8	2	1	22	11	+11	25
4	Penn State	11	8	3	0	20	11	+9	24
5	Iowa	11	7	3	1	20	9	+11	22
6	Maryland	11	5	5	1	14	18	-4	18
7	Indiana	11	4	5	2	5	8	-3	14
8	Purdue	11	3	6	2	7	11	-4	11

== Bracket ==
Quarterfinals; Sunday, Nov. 3
1	Wisconsin	0
8	Purdue	1
4	Penn State	2
5	Iowa	0
2	Rutgers	1
7	Indiana	0
3	Michigan	3
6	Maryland	0

Semifinals; Friday, Nov. 8
8	Purdue	0
4	Penn State	2
2	Rutgers	1
3	Michigan	2 OT

Final; Sunday, Nov. 10
4	Penn State	2 OT
3	Michigan	1

== Schedule ==
=== Quarterfinals ===
November 3, 2019	#1 Wisconsin	0–1	#8 Purdue	Madison, Wisconsin
1:00 p.m. EDT		Report	44' Ena Sabanagic	Stadium: McClimon Stadium; Referee: Nicole Green; Assistant referees: Jason White; Carlos Leyva; Fourth official: Justin Bell

November 3, 2019	#4 Penn State	2–0	#5 Iowa	State College, Pennsylvania
1:00 p.m. EDT	Payton Linnehan 20'; Rachel Wasserman 34'	Report		Stadium: Jeffrey Field; Referee: Alex Beehler; Assistant referees: Tim Deljanovan; Max Campbell; Fourth official: Terrence Mull

November 3, 2019	#3 Michigan	3–0	#6 Maryland	Ann Arbor, Michigan
1:00 p.m. EDT	Danielle Wolfe 35'; Meredith Haakenson 54'; Emma Cooper 84'	Report		Stadium: U-M Soccer Stadium; Attendance: 428; Referee: Khalaf Al-Latayfeh; Assistant referees: Ethan Buege; Cory Richardson; Fourth official: Tom Kaczowka

November 3, 2019	#2 Rutgers	1–0	#7 Indiana	Piscataway, New Jersey
1:00 p.m. EDT	Team 29'	Report		Stadium: Yurcak Field; Attendance: 1582; Referee: Christopher Ruska; Assistant referees: Andrew Eitel; David Berkowitz; Fourth official: Albert Calise

=== Semifinals ===
November 8, 2019	#8 Purdue	0–2	#4 Penn State	Piscataway, New Jersey
11:00 a.m.			Ally Schlegel 62'; Sam Coffey 73'	Stadium: Yurcak Field; Referee: Michael Allie; Assistant referees: Michael Gorsenger; Nick Zegestowski; Fourth official: Tony Russo

November 8, 2019	#2 Rutgers	1–2 (a.e.t.)	#3 Michigan	Piscataway, New Jersey
1:30 p.m.	Tiernny Wiltshire 89'		Sydney Shepherd 70'; Jayde Riviere +4'	Stadium: Yurcak Field; Attendance: 2048; Referee: Mike Stutt; Assistant referees: Keith Fisher; Fahrudin Sejdic; Fourth official: Tony Russo

=== Final ===
November 10, 2019	#4 Penn State	2–1 (a.e.t.)	#3 Michigan	Piscataway, New Jersey
12:00 p.m.	Sam Coffey 83'; Payton Linnehan +3'		Own Goal 82'	Stadium: Yurcak Field; Attendance: 721; Referee: Sergio Gonzalez; Assistant referees: Adorae Whitesel; William Campbell; Fourth official: Danielle Chesky

== All-Tournament team ==
- Megan Wampler, Indiana
- Riley Whitaker, Iowa
- Malikae Dayes, Maryland
- Sarah Stratigakis, Michigan
- Sydney Shepherd, Michigan
- Amanda Dennis, Penn State - Defensive Player of the Tournament
- Payton Linnehan, Penn State - Offensive Player of the Tournament
- Frankie Tagliaferri, Penn State
- Skylurr Patrick, Purdue
- Tiernny Wiltshire, Rutgers
- Cameron Murtha, Wisconsin
