= 2020 Penn State Nittany Lions women's soccer team =

2020 Penn State Nittany Lions women's soccer

Big 10 Regular Season Champion

NCAA Tournament, Sweet 16
- Conference: Big Ten Conference
- U. Soc. Coaches poll: No. 11
- TopDrawerSoccer.com: No. 11
- Record: 12–3–1 (9–1–1 Big Ten)
- Head coach: Erica Dambach (14th season)
- Assistant coaches: Ann Cook; Tim Wassell; Jack Rushworth
- Home stadium: Jeffrey Field

2020 Big Ten Conference women's soccer standings
	Conf.						Overall
Team	W		L		T	PCT	W		L		T	PCT
No. 4 Penn St ‍†‍‍	9	–	1	–	1	.864	12	–	3	–	1	.781
Ohio St ‍‍‍	6	–	1	–	3	.750	7	–	2	–	3	.708
No. 22 Rutgers ‍‍‍	6	–	2	–	3	.682	8	–	3	–	3	.679
Wisconsin ‍‍‍	6	–	3	–	2	.636	7	–	4	–	3	.607
Indiana ‍‍‍	6	–	4	–	1	.591	6	–	5	–	1	.542
Illinois ‍‍‍	6	–	4	–	1	.591	6	–	5	–	1	.542
Michigan ‍‍‍	5	–	3	–	3	.591	5	–	3	–	3	.591
Minnesota ‍‍‍	5	–	3	–	3	.591	5	–	4	–	3	.542
Northwestern ‍‍‍	5	–	6	–	0	.455	6	–	6	–	1	.500
Purdue ‍‍‍	4	–	5	–	2	.455	4	–	6	–	2	.417
Nebraska ‍‍‍	2	–	5	–	3	.350	2	–	5	–	3	.350
Iowa ‍‍‡‍^{y}	2	–	8	–	1	.227	6	–	8	–	1	.433
Michigan St ‍‍‍	1	–	9	–	1	.136	1	–	10	–	1	.125
Maryland ‍‍‍	0	–	9	–	2	.091	0	–	10	–	2	.083
† – Conference champion ‡ – 2020 Big Ten Tournament champion y – Invited to the NCAA tournament As of April 18, 2021; Rankings from United Soccer Coaches Poll; Source:2020 Women's Soccer Standings

The 2020 Penn State Nittany Lions women's soccer team represented Pennsylvania State University during the 2020 NCAA Division I women's soccer season and the 2020 Big Ten Conference women's soccer season. As a result of the COVID-19 pandemic, the 2020 fall season was postponed to the spring, and began on February 19, 2021. It was the program's 27th season fielding a women's varsity soccer team, and their 27th season in the Big Ten Conference. The 2020 season is Erica Dambach's 14th year at the helm.

== Background ==
The 2020 season is the Nittany Lions' 27th season as a varsity soccer program, and their 27th season playing in the Big Ten Conference. The team is led by 14th year head coach, Erica Dambach, who had previously served as a head coach for the Harvard.

== Player movement ==
=== Departures ===
Name	Number	Position	Height	Year	Hometown	Reason for departure
Shelby Craft	3	DF	5 ft 4 in (1.63 m)	Freshman	Frisco, TX	Transferred to Lipscomb.

== Preseason ==
=== Preseason Big Ten poll ===
Penn State was predicted to finish 1st in the Big Ten Conference.

Coaches' Poll
Predicted finish	Team
1	Penn State
2	Wisconsin
3	Michigan
4	Rutgers
5	Ohio State
6	Iowa
7	Northwestern
8	Indiana
9	Nebraska
10	Illinois
11	Purdue
12	Maryland
13	Minnesota
14	Michigan State

== Squad ==
=== Roster ===
As of May 1, 2021

Note: Flags indicate national team as defined under FIFA eligibility rules; some limited exceptions apply. Players may hold more than one non-FIFA nationality.

No.	Pos.	Nation	Player
0	GK	(United States) USA	Katie Evans
1	GK	(United States) USA	Julia Dohle
2	MF	(United States) USA	Kerry Abello (captain)
3	MF	(United States) USA	Olivia Damico
4	DF	(United States) USA	Caitlin Haislip
5	MF	(United States) USA	Cori Dyke
6	DF	(United States) USA	Kate Wiesner
8	FW	(United States) USA	Kristin Schnurr
9	FW	(United States) USA	Rachel Wasserman
10	MF	(United States) USA	Maddie Myers
12	MF	(United States) USA	Payton Linnehan
14	MF	(United States) USA	Kaitlyn Macbean
15	DF	(United States) USA	Devon Olive
16	FW	(United States) USA	Ellie Wheeler
17	MF	(United States) USA	Sam Coffey (captain)
19	MF	(United States) USA	Frankie Tagliaferri (captain)
20	FW	(United States) USA	Angela Aguero
22	MF	(United States) USA	Jordan Canniff
23	DF	(Spain) ESP	Eva Alonso
24	FW	(United States) USA	Elle Kershner
26	GK	(United States) USA	Katherine Asman
27	MF	(United States) USA	Jilly Shimkin
32	MF	(United States) USA	Natalie Wilson
33	DF	(United States) USA	Anna Carson
34	FW	(United States) USA	Ally Schlegel

=== Personnel ===
Front office
Athletic Director	Sandy Barbour
Deputy Director of Athletics	Lynn Holleran
Deputy Director of Athletics	Scott Sidwell
Coaching staff
Head coach	Erica Dambach
Assistant coach	Ann Cook
Assistant coach	Tim Wassell
Assistant coach	Jack Rushworth

Last updated: January 1, 2021
Source: Penn State Athletics

== Schedule ==
Date Time, TV	Rank^{#}	Opponent^{#}	Result	Record	Team events	Opponent events	Site (Attendance) City, State
Regular season
February 17; 12:00 p.m., BTN+		at Rutgers	L 3–2	0–1–0 (0–1–0)	K. Schnurr 1'; P. Linnehan 72'	S. Kroeger 61'; A. Ali 74'; A. Ali 86'	Iron Peaks Sports & Events (0); Piscataway, NJ
February 25; 7:00 p.m., BTN+		at Northwestern	W 4–1	1–1–0 (1–1–0)	K. Schnurr 16'; S. Coffey 58' (pen.); A. Schlegel 64'; N. Wilson (yellow card) 72'; A. Schlegel 77'	J. Aulicino 39'	Ryan Fieldhouse (1); Evanston, IL
February 28; 11:00 a.m., BTN+		at Illinois	W 2–0	2–1–0 (2–1–0)	S. Coffey 3'; A. Schlegel (yellow card) 16'; F. Tagliaferri 52'	S. Sample (yellow card) 42'	Illinois Soccer & Track Stadium (0); Champaign, IL
March 4; 4:30 p.m., BTN+	No. 13	No. 24 Indiana	W 2–1	3–1–0 (3–1–0)	F. Tagliaferri 53'; S. Coffey 60'; (yellow card) 88'	H. Nemeth 52'	Holuba Hall (100); State College, PA
March 7; 1:00 p.m., BTN+	No. 13	Michigan State	W 3–1	4–1–0 (4–1–0)	A. Schlegel 7'; F. Tagliaferri 35'; E. Kershner 73'	G. Wahlberg 26'; G. Wahlberg (yellow card) 87'	Holuba Hall (100); State College, PA
March 13; 3:00 p.m., BTN+	No. 10	at Ohio State	T 2–2	4–1–1 (4–1–1)	S. Coffey 48'; Own Goal 66'; E. Wheeler (yellow card) 93'; K. Abello (yellow card) 109'	K. Fischer 26'; K. Fischer 64'; A. Baumbick (yellow card) 66'; K. Fischer (yellow card) 67'	Jesse Owens Memorial Stadium (0); Columbus, OH
March 18; 5:30 p.m., BTN	No. 11	Minnesota	W 3–0	5–1–1 (5–1–1)	A. Schlegel 18'; A. Schlegel 22'; S. Coffey 73'	none	Jeffrey Field (158); State College, PA
March 21; 12:00 p.m., BTN	No. 11	Michigan	W 4–1	6–1–1 (6–1–1)	S. Coffey 11'; A. Schlegel 20'; P. Linnehan 29'; E. Wheeler (yellow card) 30'; P. Linnehan 62'	L. Farkas 11'; H. Beall (yellow card) 11'; L. Farkas (yellow card) 53'	Jeffrey Field (233); State College, PA
March 25; 5:00 p.m., BTN+	No. 9	at Iowa	W 1–0	7–1–1 (7–1–1)	A. Schlegel 20'; D. Olive (yellow card) 51'	D. Senkowski (yellow card) 69'	Iowa Soccer Complex (65); Iowa City, IA
March 28; 12:35 p.m., BTN+	No. 9	at Nebraska	W 3–0	8–1–1 (8–1–1)	F. Tagliaferri 3'; R. Wasserman 7'; D. Olive (yellow card) 24'; E. Kershner 60'	N. Cooke (yellow card) 15'	Hibner Stadium (270); Lincoln, NE
April 3; 12:00 p.m., BTN+	No. 6	Maryland	W 6–0	9–1–1 (9–1–1)	P. Linnehan 2'; F. Tagliaferri 9'; R. Wasserman 16'; A. Schlegel 47'; F. Tagliaferri 50'; A. Schlegel 54'	A. Broadbent (yellow card) 72'	Jeffrey Field (307); State College, PA
Big Ten Tournament
April 11; 2:00 p.m., BTN	No. 4	Indiana; Big Ten Tournament Quarterfinal	W 2–1	10–1–1 (9–1–1)	A. Schlegel 11'; F. Tagliaferri 22'; A. Schlegel 59'	A. Bennett 73'; M. Forbes (yellow card) 82'	Jeffrey Field (258); State College, PA
April 15; 5:00 p.m., BTN+	No. 4	Iowa; Big Ten Tournament Semifinal	L 1–0	10–2–1 (9–1–1)	none	S. Cary (yellow card) 18'; M. Ingles 45'; S. Cary (yellow card) 18' (yellow-red card) 61'; S. Wheaton (yellow card) 69'	Jeffrey Field (1); State College, PA
NCAA Tournament
April 28; 7:00 p.m., GOHEELSTV	No. 9	Alabama State; NCAA Tournament First Round	W 5–0	11–2–1 (9–1–1)	F. Tagliaferri 17'; F. Tagliaferri 25'; P. Linnehan 27'; O. Damico 32'; Own Goal 32'	none	WakeMed Soccer Park (100); Cary, NC
May 1; 3:00 p.m., GOHEELSTV	No. 9	No. 16 Vanderbilt; NCAA Tournament Second Round	W 2–0	12–2–1 (9–1–1)	K. Schnurr 62'; E. Alonso 73'	H. Hopkins (yellow card) 88'	WakeMed Soccer Park (145); Cary, NC
May 5; 3:00 p.m., GOHEELSTV	No. 9	No. 1 Florida State; NCAA Tournament Sweet Sixteen	L 3–1	12–3–1 (9–1–1)	F. Tagliaferri 19'	K. Lynch 30'; C. Robbins 60'; G. Carle 68'	WakeMed Soccer Park (185); Cary, NC
*Non-conference game. ^{#}Rankings from United Soccer Coaches. (#) Tournament seedings in parentheses.

Source:Penn State Athletics

== Rankings ==
Ranking movements Legend: ██ Increase in ranking ██ Decrease in ranking
	Week												
Poll	Pre	1	2	3	4	5	6	7	8	9	10	11	Final
United Soccer	Not released				13	10	11	9	6	6	4	9	11
Top Drawer Soccer	13	13	12	20	20	19	18	15	15	14	12	13	11
CollegeSoccerNews.com	17	17	17	24	24	20	18	12	11	8	6	7	7
