= 2021 Big Ten women's soccer tournament =

- Classification: Division I
- Teams: 8
- Matches: 7
- Attendance: 12,273
- Quarterfinals site: Higher seeds
- Semifinals site: Yurcak Field; Piscataway, New Jersey
- Finals site: Yurcak Field; Piscataway, New Jersey
- Champions: Michigan (3rd title)
- Winning coach: Jennifer Klein (1st title)
- MVP: Raleigh Loughman (offensive); Alia Martin (defensive) (Michigan)
- Broadcast: BTN

2021 Big Ten Conference women's soccer standings
	Conf.						Overall
Team	W		L		T	PCT	W		L		T	PCT
No. 3 Rutgers ‍†‍‍^{y}	10	–	0	–	0	1.000	19	–	3	–	2	.833
No. 24 Purdue ‍‍‍^{y}	8	–	2	–	0	.800	15	–	4	–	3	.750
No. 7 Michigan ‍‍‡‍^{y}	6	–	2	–	2	.700	18	–	4	–	3	.780
Michigan State ‍‍‍	5	–	4	–	1	.550	10	–	5	–	3	.639
Iowa ‍‍‍	5	–	4	–	1	.550	12	–	6	–	2	.650
No. 23 Penn State ‍‍‍^{y}	5	–	5	–	0	.500	12	–	8	–	1	.595
Ohio State ‍‍‍^{y}	3	–	4	–	2	.444	9	–	9	–	2	.500
Wisconsin ‍‍‍^{y}	3	–	3	–	4	.500	10	–	6	–	6	.591
Indiana ‍‍‍	3	–	4	–	3	.450	9	–	5	–	4	.611
Minnesota ‍‍‍	4	–	6	–	0	.400	8	–	6	–	3	.559
Nebraska ‍‍‍	3	–	5	–	2	.400	7	–	9	–	2	.444
Northwestern ‍‍‍	3	–	5	–	1	.389	7	–	9	–	1	.441
Illinois ‍‍‍	1	–	8	–	1	.150	5	–	11	–	1	.324
Maryland ‍‍‍	0	–	7	–	3	.150	4	–	9	–	5	.361
† – Conference champion ‡ – 2021 Big Ten Tournament champion y – Invited to the NCAA tournament As of December 7, 2021; Rankings from United Soccer Coaches Poll; Source:2021 Women's Soccer Standings

The 2021 Big Ten women's soccer tournament was the postseason women's soccer tournament for the Big Ten Conference for the 2021 season held from October 31 to November 7, 2021. The seven-match tournament took place at the home side of the higher seeded team and teams were seeded based on regular season conference play. Michigan won the title by defeating Rutgers 1–0 in the final. As the tournament champion, Michigan earned the Big Ten Conference's automatic berth into the 2021 NCAA Division I Women's Soccer Tournament. This was the third overall title for Michigan and first for head coach Jennifer Klein.

== Seeding ==
Eight Big Ten schools participated in the tournament. Teams were seeded by conference record. A tiebreaker was required to determine which school would host a Quarterfinal between Michigan State and Iowa as both teams finished the regular season with 16 points. Michigan State won the tiebreaker by virtue of their 2–1 victory at Iowa on October 23.

Seed	School	Conference	Points
1	Rutgers	10–0–0	30
2	Purdue	8–2–0	24
3	Michigan	6–2–2	20
4	Michigan State	5–4–1	16
5	Iowa	5–4–1	16
6	Penn State	5–5–0	15
7	Ohio State	4–4–2	14
8	Wisconsin	3–3–4	13

== Bracket ==
Quarterfinals; October 31
1	Rutgers	1
8	Wisconsin	0
4	Michigan State	0
5	Iowa	1
3	Michigan	3
6	Penn State	1
2	Purdue	1
7	Ohio State	0

Semifinals; November 4
1	Rutgers	2
5	Iowa	0
3	Michigan	4
2	Purdue	1

Championship; November 7
1	Rutgers	0
3	Michigan	1

== Schedule ==
=== Quarterfinals ===
October 31	#4 Michigan State	0–1	#5 Iowa	East Lansing, MI
1:00 p.m.		Report	69' Alyssa Walker	Stadium: DeMartin Stadium; Attendance: 1,988

October 31	#3 Michigan	3–1	#6 Penn State	Ann Arbor, MI
1:00 p.m.	Nicki Hernandez 10'; Raleigh Loughman 21'; Kacey Lawrence 90'	Report	86' Ally Schlegel	Stadium: U-M Soccer Stadium; Attendance: 801; Referee: Khalaf Al-Latayfeh; Assistant referees: Jaafar Rasul; Ramiro Talavera; Fourth official: Tomas Zarco

October 31	#2 Purdue	1–0	#7 Ohio State	West Lafayette, IN
3:00 p.m.	Sarah Griffith 55'	Report	(yellow card) 56' Kitty Jones-Black; (yellow card) 68' Caitlin Foley	Stadium: Folk Field; Attendance: 940; Referee: Eulogio Villalpando; Assistant referees: David Avignone; Sergio Alvarez; Fourth official: Nick Thompson

October 31	#1 Rutgers	1–0	#8 Wisconsin	Piscataway, NJ
3:30 p.m.	Sarah Brocious 33'; Allison Lowrey (yellow card) 37'; Riley Tiernan (yellow card) 58'	Report	(yellow card) 78' Joyelle Washington	Stadium: Yurcak Field; Attendance: 1,343; Referee: Michael Allie; Assistant referees: Ernest Zielinski; Nick Zegestowsky; Fourth official: Pete Mandell

=== Semifinals ===
November 4	#1 Rutgers	2–0	#5 Iowa	Piscataway, NJ
1:30 p.m.	Allison Lowrey 67'; Amirah Ali 82'	Report	(yellow card) 33' Kenzie Roling; (yellow card) 48' Alyssa Walker	Stadium: Yurcak Field; Attendance: 1,049; Referee: Donocan Noocha; Assistant referees: Keith Fisher; Ernest Zielinski; Fourth official: Pete Mandell

November 4	#2 Purdue	1–4	#3 Michigan	Piscataway, NJ
4:00 p.m.	Nicole Kevdzija (yellow card) 56'; Callie Ingram 84'	Report	(yellow card) 23' Emily Leyson; 27' Meredith Haakenson; 40' Hannah Blake; 56' (pen.) Danielle Wolfe; 58' Nicki Hernandez	Stadium: Yurcak Field; Attendance: 1,049; Referee: Dimitar Chavdarov; Assistant referees: Art Arustamyan; Michael McBride; Fourth official: Daun White

=== Final ===
November 17	#1 Rutgers	0–1	#3 Michigan	Piscataway, NJ
2:00 p.m.		Report	27' Raleigh Loughman; (yellow card) 80' Avery Kalitta; (yellow card) 85' Sydney Shepherd	Stadium: Yurcak Field; Attendance: 5,103; Referee: Nicole Green; Assistant referees: Rachel Smith; Scarlet Keane; Fourth official: Maggie Short

== Statistics ==
=== Goalscorers ===
There were 15 goals scored in 7 matches, for an average of 2.14 goals per match.

2 goals

- Nicki Hernandez – Michigan
- Raleigh Loughman – Michigan

1 goal

- Alyssa Walker – Iowa
- Hannah Blake – Michigan
- Meredith Haakenson – Michigan
- Kacey Lawrence – Michigan
- Danielle Wolfe – Michigan
- Ally Schlegel – Penn State
- Sarah Griffith – Purdue
- Callie Ingram – Purdue
- Amirah Ali – Rutgers
- Sarah Brocious – Rutgers
- Allison Lowrey – Rutgers

== All-Tournament team ==
Player	Team
Riley Whitaker	Iowa
Hillary Beall	Michigan
Raleigh Loughman*	Michigan
Alia Martin^	Michigan
Ava Cook	Michigan State
Bailey Kolinski	Ohio State
Sam Coffey	Penn State
Sarah Griffith	Purdue
Amirah Ali	Rutgers
Gabby Provenzano	Rutgers
Emma Jaskaniec	Wisconsin

* Offensive MVP
^ Defensive MVP
