= 2021 Michigan Wolverines women's soccer team =

American college soccer season

2021 Michigan Wolverines women's soccer

Big Ten Tournament Champions

NCAA Tournament, Quarterfinal
- Conference: Big Ten Conference
- U. Soc. Coaches poll: No. 7
- TopDrawerSoccer.com: No. 7
- Record: 18–4–3 (6–2–2 Big Ten)
- Head coach: Jennifer Klein
- Home stadium: U-M Soccer Stadium

2021 Big Ten Conference women's soccer standings
	Conf.						Overall
Team	W		L		T	PCT	W		L		T	PCT
No. 3 Rutgers ‍†‍‍^{y}	10	–	0	–	0	1.000	19	–	3	–	2	.833
No. 24 Purdue ‍‍‍^{y}	8	–	2	–	0	.800	15	–	4	–	3	.750
No. 7 Michigan ‍‍‡‍^{y}	6	–	2	–	2	.700	18	–	4	–	3	.780
Michigan State ‍‍‍	5	–	4	–	1	.550	10	–	5	–	3	.639
Iowa ‍‍‍	5	–	4	–	1	.550	12	–	6	–	2	.650
No. 23 Penn State ‍‍‍^{y}	5	–	5	–	0	.500	12	–	8	–	1	.595
Ohio State ‍‍‍^{y}	3	–	4	–	2	.444	9	–	9	–	2	.500
Wisconsin ‍‍‍^{y}	3	–	3	–	4	.500	10	–	6	–	6	.591
Indiana ‍‍‍	3	–	4	–	3	.450	9	–	5	–	4	.611
Minnesota ‍‍‍	4	–	6	–	0	.400	8	–	6	–	3	.559
Nebraska ‍‍‍	3	–	5	–	2	.400	7	–	9	–	2	.444
Northwestern ‍‍‍	3	–	5	–	1	.389	7	–	9	–	1	.441
Illinois ‍‍‍	1	–	8	–	1	.150	5	–	11	–	1	.324
Maryland ‍‍‍	0	–	7	–	3	.150	4	–	9	–	5	.361
† – Conference champion ‡ – 2021 Big Ten Tournament champion y – Invited to the NCAA tournament As of December 7, 2021; Rankings from United Soccer Coaches Poll; Source:2021 Women's Soccer Standings

The 2021 Michigan Wolverines women's soccer team represented the University of Michigan during the 2021 NCAA Division I women's soccer season. It was the 28th season the university fielded a women's varsity soccer team, and their 28th season in the Big Ten Conference. The team was coached by fourth year head coach Jennifer Klein. Michigan won the 2021 Big Ten Women's Soccer Tournament for the first time since 1999.

== Squad information ==
=== Coaching staff ===
Position	Name
Head coach	Jennifer Klein
Associate head coach	Katie Hultin
Assistant Coach	Tiffany Hansen
Volunteer assistant coach	Mario Zuniga-Gil

== Schedule ==
Date Time, TV	Rank^{#}	Opponent^{#}	Result	Record	Site (Attendance) City, State
Exhibition
August 9; 2:00 p.m.		at Northwestern	L 1–2	–	Lanny and Sharon Martin Stadium; Evanston, IL
August 14*; 12:00 p.m.		Virginia	L 0–1	–	U-M Soccer Stadium; Ann Arbor, MI
Regular season
August 19*; 7:00 p.m., BEDN		at Butler	W 5–0	1–0–0	Bud and Jackie Sellick Bowl (310); Indianapolis, IN
August 22*; 7:00 p.m., B1G+		Bowling Green	W 2–1	2–0–0	U-M Soccer Stadium (877); Ann Arbor, MI
August 26*; 7:00 p.m., B1G+	No. 18	Western Michigan	W 4–0	3–0–0	U-M Soccer Stadium (576); Ann Arbor, MI
August 29*; 1:00 p.m., B1G+	No. 18	Central Michigan	W 1–0	4–0–0	U-M Soccer Stadium (738); Ann Arbor, MI
September 3*; 7:00 p.m., B1G+	No. 24	USC	L 0–1 ^{OT}	4–1–0	U-M Soccer Stadium (1,300); Ann Arbor, MI
September 5*; 1:00 p.m., B1G+	No. 24	DePaul	W 1–0	5–1–0	U-M Soccer Stadium (800); Ann Arbor, MI
September 10*; 5:00 p.m., ACCNX	No. 16	at Louisville	T 1–1 ^{2OT}	5–1–1	Dr. Mark & Cindy Lynn Stadium (600); Louisville, KY
September 12*; 3:00 p.m., ESPN+	No. 16	at No. 23 Cincinnati	W 2–1	6–1–1	Gettler Stadium (498); Cincinnati, OH
September 17; 5:00 p.m., B1G+	No. 21	Illinois	W 2–1 ^{2OT}	7–1–1 (1–0–0)	U-M Soccer Stadium (790); Ann Arbor, MI
September 23; 7:00 p.m., BTN	No. 18	at No. 9 Rutgers	–	–	Yurcak Field; Piscataway, NJ
September 26; 12:00 p.m., B1G+	No. 18	Wisconsin	T 0–0 ^{2OT}	7–1–2 (1–0–1)	U-M Soccer Stadium (1,214); Ann Arbor, MI
September 30; 7:00 p.m., B1G+	No. 17	at Purdue	W 4–2	8–1–2 (2–0–1)	Folk Field (608); West Lafayette, IN
October 3; 1:00 p.m., B1G+	No. 17	at Indiana	T 0–0 ^{OT}	8–1–3 (2–0–2)	Bill Armstrong Stadium (–); Bloomington, IN
October 6; 1:00 p.m., B1G+	No. 16	at No. 8 Rutgers	L 1–4	8–2–3 (2–1–2)	Yurcak Field (78); Piscataway, NJ
October 10; 1:00 p.m., BTN	No. 16	at Nebraska	W 3–2	9–2–3 (3–1–2)	Barbara Hibner Stadium (680); Lincoln, NE
October 14; 7:00 p.m., B1G+	No. 22	Michigan State	W 1–0	10–2–3 (4–1–2)	U-M Soccer Stadium (1,503); Ann Arbor, MI
October 17; 2:00 p.m., BTN	No. 22	at Ohio State	L 1–2	10–3–3 (4–2–2)	Jesse Owens Memorial Stadium (1,076); Columbus, OH
October 21; 7:00 p.m., FS1		No. 24 Penn State	W 2–0	11–3–3 (5–2–2)	U-M Soccer Stadium (1,133); Ann Arbor, MI
October 24; 12:00 p.m., B1G+		Maryland	W 2–1 ^{OT}	12–3–3 (6–2–2)	U-M Soccer Stadium (1,140); Ann Arbor, MI
Big Ten Tournament
October 31; 1:00 p.m., B1G+	(3) No. 17	vs. (6) Penn State; Quarterfinal	W 3–1	13–3–3	U-M Soccer Stadium (801); Ann Arbor, MI
November 4; 1:00 p.m., BTN	(3) No. 13	vs. (2) No. 19 Purdue; Semifinal	W 4–1	14–3–3	Yurcak Field (2,098); Piscataway, NJ
November 7; 2:00 p.m., BTN	(3) No. 13	(1) No. 4 Rutgers; Championship Game	W 1–0	15–3–3	Yurcak Field (5,103); Piscataway, NJ
NCAA Tournament
November 12; 6:00 p.m., B1G+	(2) No. 9	vs. Bowling Green; First round	W 3–0	16–3–3	U-M Soccer Stadium (1,390); Ann Arbor, MI
November 19; 5:00 p.m., B1G+	(2) No. 9	vs. Wake Forest; Second round	W 2–0	17–3–3	U-M Soccer Stadium (1,457); Ann Arbor, MI
November 21; 1:00 p.m., B1G+	(2) No. 9	vs. (3) No. 6 Tennessee; Round of 16	W 3–0	18–3–3	U-M Soccer Stadium (1,008); Ann Arbor, MI
November 26; 2:00 p.m., ACCNX	(2) No. 9	vs. (1) No. 1 Florida State; Quarterfinal	L 0–1 ^{OT}	18–4–3	Seminole Soccer Complex; Tallahassee, FL
*Non-conference game. ^{#}Rankings from United Soccer Coaches. (#) Tournament seedings in parentheses. Source:

== Rankings ==
Ranking movements Legend: ██ Increase in ranking ██ Decrease in ranking — = Not ranked RV = Received votes
	Week																	
Poll	Pre	1	2	3	4	5	6	7	8	9	10	11	12	13	14	15	16	Final
United Soccer Coaches	—	18	24	16	21	18	17	16	22	RV	17	13	9	Not released				7
Top Drawer Soccer	—	—	—	24	25	25	23	21	22	25	RV	22	15	14	10	5	7	7
