= Michigan Ultras =

The Michigan Ultras is the Michigan Wolverines men's and women's soccer student section. The section consists of over 900 members and provides a distinct game-time atmosphere. The section is located in the student bleachers of the U-M Soccer Complex and is a registered official student organization with the University of Michigan.

== History ==
The Michigan Ultras was officially founded in the spring of 2010 by Matthew Peven. Possessing an ever-growing fanbase, their members are known for their loyal dedication in supporting the men's and women's soccer teams by creating an exciting and intimidating atmosphere through organized chanting and cheering. Additionally, they aim at creating a unified campus group that is founded in a love for soccer.

== Traditions ==
Since its beginning, the Ultras are known for various chants that have been developed and passed down over the section's history. The chants are often improvised within the duration of a match, and they carry on throughout the rest of the season. Several of their classic chants can be found on their YouTube page and website. There are also members that are dedicated to playing drums or cowbells at every match. For bigger games, the Ultras will host marches across campus to the soccer complex, carrying banners and flags. Consistent members receive a shirt and scarf for attending a certain number of soccer matches during the season.

Post season, the Ultras are also known for hosting intramural teams, guest lectures, FIFA tournaments, and watch parties for big international soccer matches to help promote soccer awareness across campus.
