= Reggie Crawford =

American baseball player (born 2000)

San Francisco Giants
- Pitcher
- Born: December 4, 2000 (age 25); Lansdale, Pennsylvania, U.S.
- Bats: Left Throws: Left
- Stats at Baseball Reference

Reginald David Crawford (born December 4, 2000) is an American professional baseball pitcher in the San Francisco Giants organization. He was drafted in the first round, 30th overall, by the Giants in the 2022 MLB draft.

== High school ==
Crawford grew up in Frackville, Pennsylvania, and attended North Schuylkill High School, where he was a member of the baseball and swimming teams. In swimming, Crawford won the Pennsylvania Interscholastic Athletic Association state championship in the 50-yard freestyle with a record time of 20.45 seconds during his junior year. As a senior, he batted for a .482 average with eight home runs and 39 RBIs and had 4–2 record as a pitcher with 49 strikeouts in 33 innings pitched. Crawford was selected in the 37th round of the 2019 MLB draft by the Kansas City Royals, but did not sign with the team.

== College career ==
Crawford attended the University of Connecticut and batted .365 with a home run and 16 RBIs and had one pitching appearance through 13 games of his true freshman season before it was cut short due to the coronavirus pandemic. After the season, he played collegiate summer baseball for the Westfield Starfires of the Futures Collegiate Baseball League, and was named the league's Co-Top Pro Pitching Prospect at the end of the season after recording three saves and striking out 10 batters in 6 1/3 innings over five appearances.

As a sophomore, Crawford hit .295 and led the Big East Conference with 13 home runs and 62 RBIs while also posting a 1–1 record with one save and a 2.35 ERA and 17 strikeouts in 7 2/3 innings pitched. He played summer baseball for the Bourne Braves of the Cape Cod Baseball League in 2021. Crawford was also selected to play for the Team USA Collegiate National Baseball Team. Crawford tore the ulnar collateral ligament during a fall scrimmage against Rhode Island and had Tommy John surgery, causing him to miss his junior season. After the conclusion of the 2022 season, he announced that he would be entering the NCAA transfer portal and ultimately committed to transfer to Tennessee.

== Professional career ==
The San Francisco Giants selected Crawford in the first round, with the 30th overall selection, of the 2022 Major League Baseball draft. He signed with the team on July 28, 2022, and received a $2.3 million signing bonus. He made his professional debut with the rookie–level Arizona Complex League Giants, hitting .158 in six games.

In 2023, Crawford split the season between the Single–A San Jose Giants and High–A Eugene Emeralds. As a batter, he hit .235/.263/.529 with one home run and five RBI across 18 games. As a pitcher, he recorded a 2.84 ERA with 32 strikeouts across 13 starts.

On February 14, 2024, Crawford announced that he would focus primarily on pitching moving forward. In 14 games split between the Double–A Richmond Flying Squirrels and Triple–A Sacramento River Cats, he compiled a 2.95 ERA with 30 strikeouts across 18 1/3 innings pitched. On September 25, Crawford underwent a shoulder labrum surgery, ruling him out for 10–to–12 months.

On September 16, 2025, it was announced that Crawford had undergone another shoulder surgery, sidelining him until the middle of the 2026 season.

== Personal life ==
Crawford got engaged to soccer player Payton Crawford (née Linnehan) in January 2026. They married in April 2026.
