= Alyssa Walker =

American soccer player (born 1997)

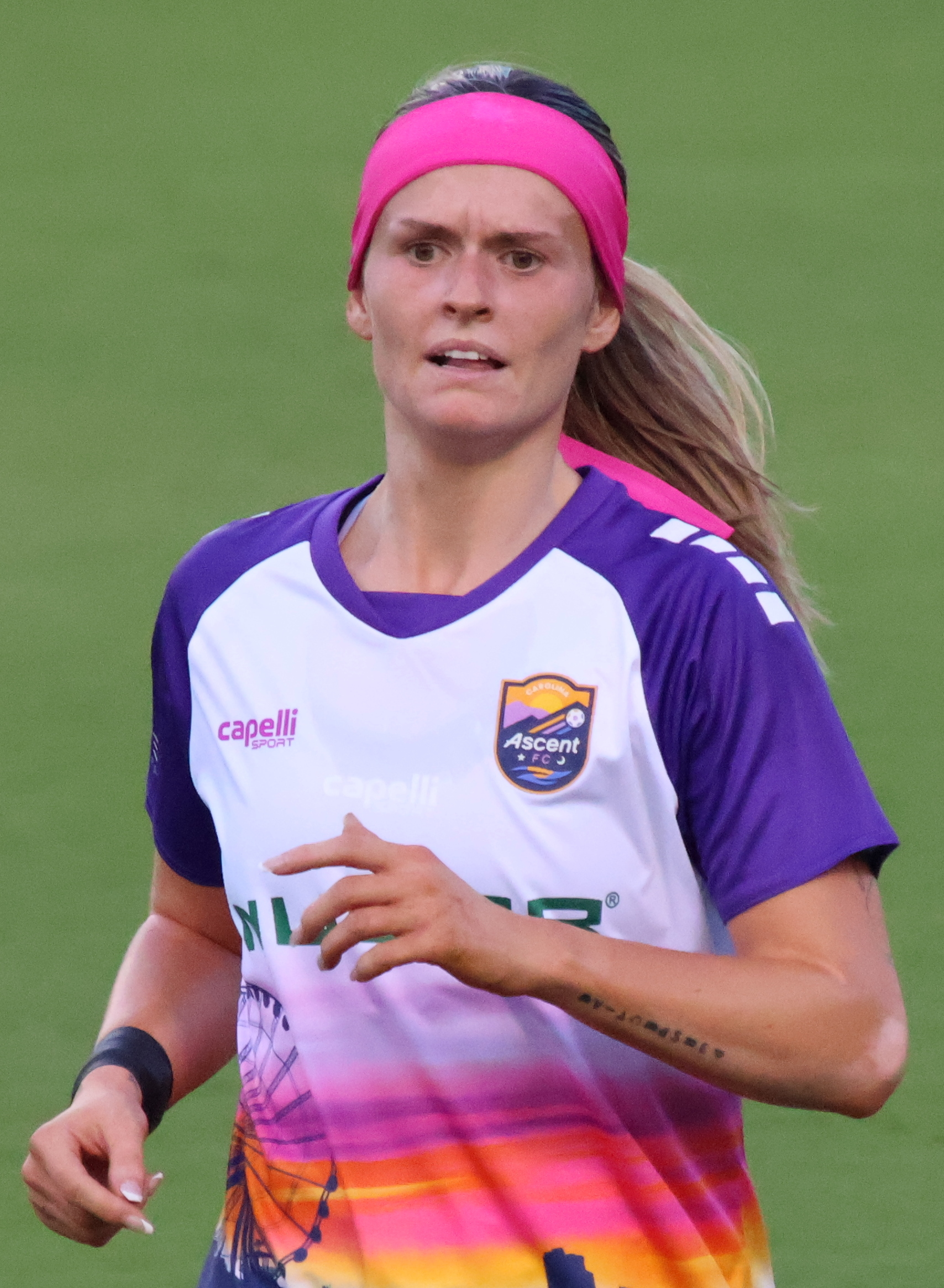
- Walker with the Carolina Ascent in 2025

Personal information
- Full name: Alyssa Mae Walker
- Date of birth: November 30, 1997 (age 28)
- Height: 5 ft 10 in (1.78 m)
- Position: Forward

Team information
- Current team: DC Power FC
- Number: 11

College career
Years	Team	Apps	(Gls)
2016–2020	Richmond Spiders	60	(19)
2021	Iowa Hawkeyes	20	(9)

Senior career*
Years	Team	Apps	(Gls)
2022	IFK Kalmar	23	(9)
2023	Brann	17	(2)
2023	→ Portland Thorns (loan)	3	(0)
2023–2024	HB Køge	16	(4)
2024–2025	Spokane Zephyr	0	(0)
2025	Carolina Ascent	10	(2)
2026–	DC Power FC	13	(5)
- * Club domestic league appearances and goals as of 01:46, May 18, 2026 (UTC)

Alyssa Mae Walker (born November 30, 1997) is an American professional soccer player who plays as a forward for USL Super League club DC Power FC. She played college soccer for the Richmond Spiders and the Iowa Hawkeyes. She previously played for Kalmar, Brann, Portland Thorns FC, HB Køge, and Carolina Ascent FC.

== Early life ==
Walker grew up in Centerville, Ohio. She played three varsity seasons at Centerville High School, earning all-state honors in her senior year, and was also a member of the track and basketball teams. She played ECNL club soccer for Ohio Premier.

== College career ==
Walker played four seasons for the Richmond Spiders, scoring 19 goals in 60 games. She was named to the Atlantic 10 Conference all-rookie team after scoring 5 goals as a freshman in 2016. After sitting out her junior season due to injury in 2018, she led the conference with a career-high 11 goals in 2019, earning second-team All-Atlantic-10 honors. After a brief senior year due to the COVID-19 pandemic, she transferred to the Iowa Hawkeyes for her sixth and final season in 2021. She scored 9 goals in 19 appearances in 2021, earning third-team All-Big Ten honors. She had the lone goal in the Big Ten tournament game against Michigan State to advance to the semifinals.

== Club career ==
=== IFK Kalmar ===
Walker signed her first professional contract with Swedish club IFK Kalmar in November 2021, joining a contingent of several Americans. She had previously spoken with Finnish and Australian teams before hearing from the newly promoted Damallsvenskan side, where she reunited with former club teammate Aubrei Corder. The 24-year-old rookie impressed during the 2022 preseason, positioning herself to earn a starting spot. She made her professional debut on March 27, starting in the opening day 4–0 loss to Kristianstad. On May 8, she scored her first professional goals, hitting both of IFK Kalmar's goals in a 4–2 loss to KIF Örebro. By the end of June, her 4 goals in 12 games earned her a contract extension for the 2023 season. She was named the Damallsvenskan Player of the Month for her performances in October when she scored three crucial goals at the end of the season to help IFK Kalmar retain their place in the top flight. She finished the 2022 season as the club's leading scorer with 9 goals in 23 games.

=== Brann and Portland Thorns loan ===
In January 2023, Walker joined Norwegian club Brann on a two-year contract. She scored a goal in her Toppserien debut on March 25, in a 2–1 away win over Lyn in the season opener. In July, having scored 2 goals in 17 league games for Brann, Walker joined National Women's Soccer League (NWSL) club Portland Thorns on a two-month loan to replace players away at the 2023 FIFA Women's World Cup. She made her Thorns debut on July 21, coming on for goalscorer Hannah Betfort in a 4–1 win against the San Diego Wave in the 2023 NWSL Challenge Cup group stage. She finished the loan with three Challenge Cup appearances for the Thorns.

=== HB Køge ===
After the loan expired, Danish club HB Køge acquired Walker from Brann for a transfer fee in August 2023. She made her UEFA Women's Champions League debut with the club on September 6, starting in a 2–1 first qualifying round loss to Finnish club KuPS. On September 30, she scored her first goal for the club in a 4–2 league win over AGF. She finished the season as HB Køge's joint third leading scorer with 4 goals in 16 league games.

=== Carolina Ascent ===
In June 2024, Walker signed with USL Super League club Spokane Zephyr before the league's inaugural season. However, she injured her anterior cruciate ligament (ACL) before the season and missed the entire campaign. In July 2025, she joined fellow USL Super League club Carolina Ascent. On September 13, she scored her first goal for the Ascent in a 2–2 draw with Sporting JAX. On October 4, she scored a late header to secure a 3–2 win over DC Power FC, the Ascent's first win of the season. She left the Ascent having scored 2 goals in 10 games.

=== DC Power FC ===
In January 2026, Walker joined USL Super League club DC Power FC on a transfer from Carolina. Less than twenty minutes into her DC Power debut, a substitute appearance on February 7, 2026, Walker scored the game-winning goal to help DC beat Sporting JAX, 1–0, and start off the spring campaign with a victory. In the following match, a draw with the Tampa Bay Sun, she recorded her first Power FC start and registered her first full 90-minute performance since her ACL injury.

== Personal life ==
Walker is the daughter of Chris and Carie Walker and has three siblings. She has been open about her experience with vitiligo.

== Honors and awards ==
Individual

- Third-team All-Big Ten: 2021
- Second-team All-Atlantic-10: 2019
