= Ani Sarkisian =

American–Armenian footballer (born 1995)

Ani Sarkisian Անի Սարկիսյան (Armenian)
Personal information
- Full name: Ani C. Sarkisian
- Date of birth: 18 May 1995 (age 31)
- Place of birth: United States
- Height: 1.73 m (5 ft 8 in)
- Positions: Midfielder; forward

Youth career
- Cresskill Cougars

College career
Years	Team	Apps	(Gls)
2013	Florida State Seminoles	0	(0)
2014–2017	Michigan Wolverines	75	(19)

International career^{‡}
2021–	Armenia	1	(0)
- ‡ National team caps and goals as of 8 April 2021.

Ani C. Sarkisian (born 18 May 1995) is an American-born Armenian footballer who plays as a forward for the Armenia women's national team.

== Early life and education ==
Raised in Cresskill, New Jersey, Sarkisian has attended the Cresskill High School in her hometown, the Florida State University in Tallahassee, Florida and the University of Michigan in Ann Arbor, Michigan.

== International career ==
Sarkisian capped for Armenia at senior level in a 2–0 friendly win over Lebanon on 8 April 2021.
