= Alia Martin =

American soccer player (born 1998)

Personal information
- Full name: Alia Marie Martin
- Date of birth: June 9, 1998 (age 28)
- Height: 5 ft 9 in (1.75 m)
- Position: Defender

Youth career
- Eclipse Select
- Indiana Fire

College career
Years	Team	Apps	(Gls)
2017–2021	Michigan Wolverines	76	(2)

Senior career*
Years	Team	Apps	(Gls)
2022	Washington Spirit	0	(0)
2023	Indy Eleven	3	(0)
- * Club domestic league appearances and goals as of 05:37, June 29, 2026 (UTC)

Alia Marie Martin (born June 9, 1998) is an American former professional soccer player who played as a defender. She played college soccer for the Michigan Wolverines, earning first-team All-American honors in 2021, before spending stints with the Washington Spirit of the National Women's Soccer League (NWSL) and Indy Eleven of the USL W League.

== Early life ==
Martin was raised in Carmel, Indiana, as one of three children born to Michael and Tamara Martin. She grew up playing soccer alongside her older sister, Reilly; the siblings would later play together collegiately at the University of Michigan. Martin attended Brebeuf Jesuit Preparatory School, where she was a varsity letterwinner in both soccer and basketball. With the soccer team, she earned four all-state first team honors, three all-region honors, and two high school All-American honors. In 2015, she was named Indiana's Gatorade Player of the Year after leading Brebeuf to a state title; in the championship match, she assisted both of Brebeuf Jesuit's goals in a 2–1 victory over Penn High School. The following year, she was named the Indiana Sports Awards' girls soccer player of the year after her school received another title match. Martin also played club soccer for Eclipse Select SC, contributing to an ECNL title in 2014, before joining the Indiana Fire.

== College career ==
As a freshman with the Michigan Wolverines in 2017, Martin operated primarily as a defensive midfielder. She started all matches she participated in, despite missing 6 games. The following year, she started all 11 of the Wolverines' games before her season was curtailed early due to injury. As a junior in 2019, she had a breakout year, earning first-team All-Big Ten honors after racking up the fourth-highest minutes on her team and playing in 22 matches at center back.

Martin's senior season was pushed back to the spring of 2021 as opposed to the fall of 2020, due to the COVID-19 pandemic. Once the season rolled around, Martin started all 11 of Michigan's matches, led the team in minutes, and earned a spot on the All-Big Ten first team yet again. She then returned for a fifth season of college soccer as a graduate student in the fall of 2021. Although injury forced her to sit out four games, Martin excelled, earning first-team All-American honors, being named first-team All-Big Ten for the third consecutive time, and being selected as a Mac Hermann Trophy semifinalist. She was recognized as the Defensive Player of the 2021 Big Ten tournament after helping the Wolverines win the competition on a 1–0 win over Rutgers.

== Club career ==
On December 18, 2021, the Washington Spirit announced the signing of Martin to her first professional contract, a one-year deal with a club option for an additional season, after acquiring her from college via the National Women's Soccer League's discovery process as opposed to the college draft. Martin did not make a single competitive appearance for the Spirit in 2022. She was released from the club at the end of her rookie season, with Washington opting to decline her contract option.

In 2023, Martin played for Indy Eleven of the pre-professional USL W League. In Indy Eleven's semifinal match, Martin scored for the first time in seven years, netting the go-ahead goal in an eventual 3–2 win over the San Francisco Glens. Then, in the W League final, she was named the championship match MVP after scoring the game-winning bicycle kick in the 99th minute of the final. On August 3, 2023, Martin was included in the All-League second team alongside two of her Indy Eleven teammates.

== International career ==
Martin received multiple invites to United States under-17 national team camps in 2014.

== Honors and awards ==
Michigan Wolverines

- Big Ten women's soccer tournament: 2021

Individual

- First-team All-American: 2021
- First-team All-Big Ten: 2019, 2020, 2021
- Big Ten tournament Defensive MVP: 2021
