= Torah Betteridge =

Canadian soccer player (born 2008)

Personal information
- Date of birth: September 23, 2008 (age 18)
- Place of birth: Calgary, Alberta, Canada
- Height: 1.73 m (5 ft 8 in)
- Position: Midfielder

Youth career
- Calgary Foothills FC

College career
Years	Team	Apps	(Gls)
2026–	Michigan Wolverines	0	(0)

Senior career*
Years	Team	Apps	(Gls)
2024	ASA High Performance	9	(0)
2024–2025	Vancouver Rise FC Academy (Note: Whitecaps FC Girls Elite changed its name to Vancovuer Rise FC Academy in 2025)	14	(0)
2026	Calgary Wild FC	8	(0)

International career^{‡}
2025	Canada U17	3+	(0)
- * Club domestic league appearances and goals as of June 29, 2026 ‡ National team caps and goals as of December 31, 2025

Torah Betteridge (born September 23, 2008) is a Canadian soccer player.

== Early life ==
Betteridge played youth soccer with Calgary Foothills WFC.

== College career ==
In November 2025, Betteridge committed to Michigan University to play for the women's soccer team,beginning in the fall of 2026.

== Club career ==
In 2024, Betteridge played with ASA High Performance in League1 Alberta. Later in 2024, she joined the Whitecaps FC Girls Elite Academy for the 2024–25 CONCACAF W Champions Cup, continuing with the side in 2025 (who were re-branded as the Vancouver Rise FC Academy).

In 2026, she joined Calgary Wild FC in the Northern Super League on a youth development permit, allowing her to appear in eight matches. On April 25, 2026, she made her professional debut, playing the full match against Montreal Roses FC.

== International career ==
In January 2025, Betteridge was called up to the Canada U17 for the Costa Cálida MIMA Cup. She was later called up for the 2025 CONCACAF U-17 Women's World Cup qualification, as well as a Four Nations tournament in July 2025.

== Career statistics ==
As of June 29, 2026

Club	Season	League			Playoffs		Domestic Cup		Continental		Other		Total	
Club	Season	Division	Apps	Goals	Apps	Goals	Apps	Goals	Apps	Goals	Apps	Goals	Apps	Goals
ASA High Performance	2024	League1 Alberta	9	0	—		—		—		—		9	0
Vancouver Rise FC Academy	2024	League1 British Columbia	0	0	0	0	—		1	0	0	0	1	0
Vancouver Rise FC Academy	2025	League1 British Columbia	14	0	—		—		4	0	—		18	0
Vancouver Rise FC Academy	Total		14	0	0	0	0	0	5	0	0	0	19	0
Calgary Wild FC	2026	Northern Super League	8	0	0	0	—		—		—		8	0
Career total			31	0	0	0	0	0	5	0	0	0	36	0
