= Abby Crumpton =

American soccer forward/defender

Personal information
- Full name: Abby Lynn Crumpton
- Date of birth: April 6, 1981 (age 45)
- Place of birth: Rochester Hills, Michigan, United States
- Height: 5 ft 7 in (1.70 m)
- Positions: Forward; defender

College career
Years	Team	Apps	(Gls)
1999–2002	Michigan Wolverines		

Senior career*
Years	Team	Apps	(Gls)
2003	Atlanta Beat	18	(3)
2004	Asheville Splash	6	(3)
2007–2008	Charlotte Lady Eagles	9	(2)
2009	Boston Breakers	4	(0)
2009	→ Boston Aztec (loan)	5	(3)

International career
- United States U-21

Managerial career
- 2004: Pitt-Bradford Panthers
- 2005: Clemson Tigers (assistant)
- 2006: Anderson Lady Ravens
- 2007: Michigan Wolverines (assistant)
- 2008: Liberty Lady Flames (assistant)
- 2009: Western Michigan Broncos (assistant)
- 2010–2011: Syracuse Orange (assistant)
- * Club domestic league appearances and goals

Abby Lynn Crumpton (born April 6, 1981) is an American soccer forward/defender who last played for Boston Breakers of Women's Professional Soccer. She was inducted in 2022 into the University of Michigan Athletic Hall of Honor.
