= Keri Sarver =

Retired American soccer player

Personal information
- Date of birth: March 30, 1976 (age 50)
- Place of birth: Akron, Ohio, United States
- Position: Forward

College career
Years	Team	Apps	(Gls)
1995–1998	Maryland Terrapins	94	(61)

Senior career*
Years	Team	Apps	(Gls)
2001	Washington Freedom	1	(0)
2002	Maryland Pride		
2003	New York Power	1	(0)
- * Club domestic league appearances and goals

Keri Beth Sarver (born March 30, 1976, in Akron, Ohio) is a retired American football player.

== Early life and education ==
Sarver was born in Akron, Ohio on March 30, 1976. She graduated from Jackson High School in 1995, then received a Bachelor of Science in computer science from the University of Maryland in 1999.

== Career ==
=== Athletic career ===
Before and during university, Sarver played for the U.S. Youth National Teams from the U16 through U21 levels.

While studying at the University of Maryland college team, she played soccer for Maryland Terrapins. While there, she was named an All-Atlantic Coast Conference (ACC) player twice and was selected to play on the ACC 50th anniversary team in 2002. In 1998, she was named an All-American and the university's Female Student-Athlete of the Year. During her tenure, the team played in four National Collegiate Athletic Association Tournaments. Upon graduation, she held five university records: total goals (61), assists (33), and points (155), as well as single-season assists (15); she also tied for the record of goals in a single season (21).

After graduation, Sarver took on a position as a software engineer and played semi-professionally in the USL W-League. She later became part of the 2000 WUSA Draft. Sarver played for the Washington Freedom, New York Power and Carolina Courage.

She played for Maryland Pride in 2002.

=== Coaching ===
Since retiring from professional soccer, Sarver has coached professionally. Beginning in 2003, she coached part-time for Internationals Soccer Club and was named the Director of Coaching in 2008. In 2009, she received various honors for her coaching skills, including being named the United States Youth Soccer Association Girls Competitive National Coach of the Year, as well as the Ohio Youth Soccer Association North State and Region II Girls Competitive Coach of the Year.

Beginning in 2011, Sarver worked at the University of Akron as an assistant coach, as well as with the United States Soccer Federation Youth National Teams Program.

In 2017, she moved from her position as the Internationals SC Director of Coaching to the head coach of the United States women's national under-19 soccer team.

In 2021, Sarver became an assistant coach for the New Zealand women's national football team, a position she still held in August 2023.

In February 2025, Sarver became an assistant coach for the Czech Republic women's national football team.

== Honor ==
Sarver was inducted into her high school's Hall of Fame in 2004 and into the Ohio Soccer Hall of Fame in 2011.
