= Erica Dambach =

American soccer coach (born 1975)

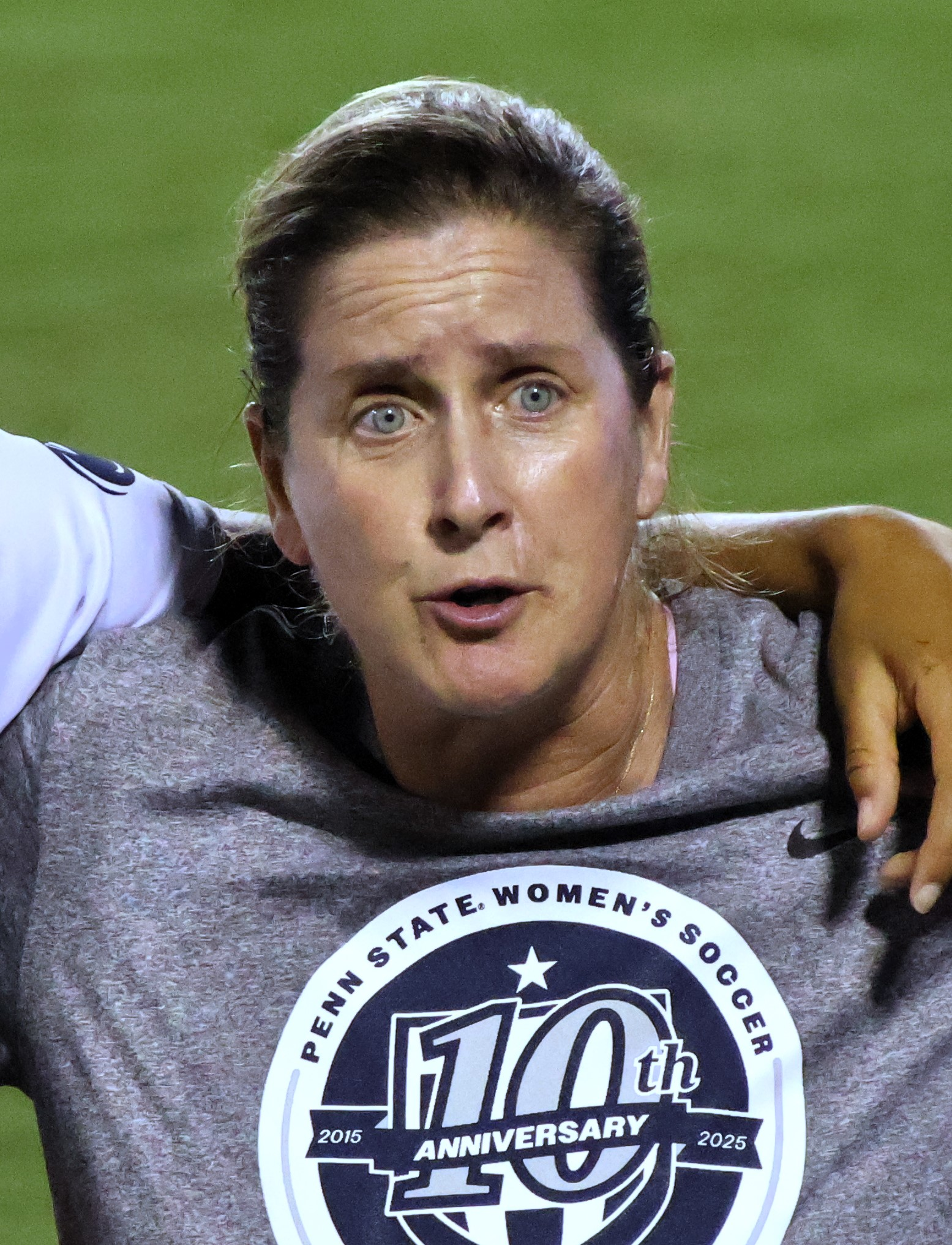
- Dambach with Penn State in 2025

Personal information
- Full name: Erica Marie Dambach
- Birth name: Erica Marie Walsh
- Date of birth: November 16, 1975 (age 50)
- Place of birth: Bordentown, New Jersey, United States
- Positions: Defender; midfielder

Team information
- Current team: Penn State (coach)

Youth career
- 1991–1992: Lower Moreland Lions

College career
Years	Team	Apps	(Gls)
1993–1996	William & Mary		

Managerial career
- 1997: Bucknell (assistant)
- 1998–1999: Dartmouth (assistant)
- 2000–2002: Dartmouth
- 2003–2004: Lehigh (assistant)
- 2004: United States U19 (assistant)
- 2004–2007: United States U17
- 2005: Florida State (assistant)
- 2006: Harvard
- 2007–: Penn State
- 2007–2012: United States (assistant)
- 2020: United States (assistant)

Erica Marie Dambach (née Walsh; born November 16, 1975) is an American college soccer coach who is the head coach of the Penn State Nittany Lions women's soccer team. She led Penn State to the 2015 national championship. She is a two-time NSCAA Coach of the Year, winning the award in 2012 and 2015.

== Coaching career ==
She was the head coach at Dartmouth from 2000 to 2002, resigning following the 2002 season in order to pursue educational opportunities. After serving as an assistant coach at Lehigh, she was hired as an assistant coach at Florida State in January 2005. She was hired as head coach at Harvard prior to the 2006 season. In February 2007, she then resigned at Harvard in order to take the Penn State head coaching position. She was named the NSCAA Coach of the Year in 2012 and 2015.

She led Penn State to a national championship in 2015.

She was an assistant coach for the United States women's national soccer team at the 2008 Summer Olympics.

She was an assistant coach for the United States women's national soccer team for the 2020 CONCACAF Women's Olympic Qualifying Championship.

== Personal life ==
She married Jason Dambach in January 2016.

== College head coaching record ==
Record table
Season	Team	Overall	Conference	Standing	Postseason
Dartmouth Big Green (Ivy League) (2000–2002)
2000	Dartmouth	14–5–0	6–1–0	T–1st	NCAA Round of 16
2001	Dartmouth	11–5–1	5–1–1	T–1st	NCAA Round of 16
2002	Dartmouth	12–5–1	5–2–0	2nd	NCAA First Round
Dartmouth:		37–15–2 (.704)	16–4–1 (.786)		
Harvard Crimson (Ivy League) (2006)
2006	Harvard	3–13–1	2–5–0	6th	
Harvard:		3–13–1 (.206)	2–5 (.286)		
Penn State Nittany Lions (Big Ten) (2007–present)
2007	Penn State	18–4–2	9–1–0	1st	NCAA Round of 16
2008	Penn State	16–8–0	8–2–0	T–1st	NCAA First Round
2009	Penn State	13–6–2	8–1–1	1st	NCAA Second Round
2010	Penn State	11–9–1	8–2–0	T–1st	NCAA Second Round
2011	Penn State	21–5–0	10–1–0	1st	NCAA Round of 16
2012	Penn State	21–4–2	10–0–1	1st	NCAA Runners-up
2013	Penn State	15–7–1	7–4–0	3rd	NCAA Second Round
2014	Penn State	20–4–0	12–1–0	1st	NCAA Quarterfinals
2015	Penn State	22–3–2	8–2–1	T–1st	NCAA Championship
2016	Penn State	12–5–4	7–1–3	T–1st	NCAA Second Round
2017	Penn State	15–5–4	6–2–3	T–4th	NCAA Quarterfinals
2018	Penn State	18–6–1	9–2–0	1st	NCAA Quarterfinals
2019	Penn State	17–7–1	8–3–0	4th	NCAA Round of 16
2020	Penn State	12–3–1	9–1–1	1st	NCAA Round of 16
2021	Penn State	12–8–1	5–5–0	6th	NCAA Round of 16
2022	Penn State	15–5–3	5–3–2	6th	NCAA Round of 16
2023	Penn State	14–2–4	6–1–3	4th	NCAA Quarterfinals
2024	Penn State	15–7–3	5–4–2	10th	NCAA Quarterfinals
2025	Penn State	10–8–3	5–4–2	6th	NCAA Second Round
Penn State:		297–106–35 (.718)	145–40–19 (.757)		
Total:		337–134–38 (.699)			
National champion Postseason invitational champion Conference regular season champion Conference regular season and conference tournament champion Division regular season champion Division regular season and conference tournament champion Conference tournament champion
