= Jennifer Klein (soccer coach) =

American soccer coach

Current position
- Title: Head coach
- Team: Michigan
- Conference: Big Ten
- Record: 63–37–15 (.613)

Biographical details
- Born: June 20, 1984 (age 42); Prescott, Arizona
- Education: Arizona

Playing career
- 2002–2005: Arizona

Coaching career (HC unless noted)
- 2006: Arizona (Volunteer asst.)
- 2007–2009: UNLV (asst.)
- 2010–2011: UNLV
- 2012–2013: Washington State (asst.)
- 2014: USC (asst.)
- 2015–2017: USC (AHC)
- 2018–2025: Michigan

Head coaching record
- Overall: 82–55–19 (.587)
- Tournaments: NCAA: 5–3 (.625)

Jennifer Klein (born June 20, 1984) is an American college soccer coach who was head coach at Michigan.

== Playing career ==
Klein played as a midfielder for the Arizona Wildcats from 2002 to 2005.

== Coaching career ==
=== UNLV ===
On June 15, 2010, Klein was promoted to head coach of the UNLV women's soccer program after the departure of Kat Mertz who left for Texas.

=== Washington State ===
On March 1, 2012, Klein was named an assistant coach of the Washington State women's soccer program.

=== USC ===
On January 17, 2014, Klein was named an assistant coach of the USC Trojans women's soccer program. On May 26, 2015, Klein was promoted to associate head coach at USC.

=== Michigan ===
On February 28, 2018, Klein was named the new head coach of the Michigan Wolverines women's soccer program. On September 21, 2021, Michigan announced they extended Klein's contract through the 2025 season.

== Head coaching record ==
=== College ===
Record table
Season	Team	Overall	Conference	Standing	Postseason
UNLV Rebels (Mountain West Conference) (2010–2011)
2010	UNLV	11–8–1	2–4–1	5th	
2011	UNLV	8–10–3	3–2–1	4th	
UNLV:		19–18–4 (.512)	5–6–2 (.462)		
Michigan Wolverines (Big Ten Conference) (2018–Present)
2018	Michigan	9–9–1	5–5–1	T-7th	
2019	Michigan	17–6–1	8–2–1	T-2nd	NCAA Round of 16
2020	Michigan	5–3–3	5–3–3	T-7th	
2021	Michigan	18–4–3	6–2–2	3rd	NCAA Quarterfinals
2022	Michigan	7–8–3	2–6–2	12th	
2023	Michigan	7–7–4	3–5–2	T-7th	NCAA First Round
Michigan:		63–37–15 (.613)	29–23–11 (.548)		
Total:		82–55–19 (.587)			
National champion Postseason invitational champion Conference regular season champion Conference regular season and conference tournament champion Division regular season champion Division regular season and conference tournament champion Conference tournament champion
