= Meghan Toohey (soccer) =

American soccer player

Personal information
- Full name: Meghan Toohey
- Date of birth: January 12, 1992 (age 34)
- Place of birth: Philadelphia, Pennsylvania
- Height: 5 ft 1 in (1.55 m)
- Position: Midfielder

College career
Years	Team	Apps	(Gls)
2010–2013	Michigan Wolverines		

Senior career*
Years	Team	Apps	(Gls)
2015–2016	Kvarnsvedens IK	45	(5)
- * Club domestic league appearances and goals

Meghan Toohey (born January 12, 1992) is an American soccer midfielder who played for Kvarnsvedens IK.
