= Payton Crawford =

American soccer player (born 2001)

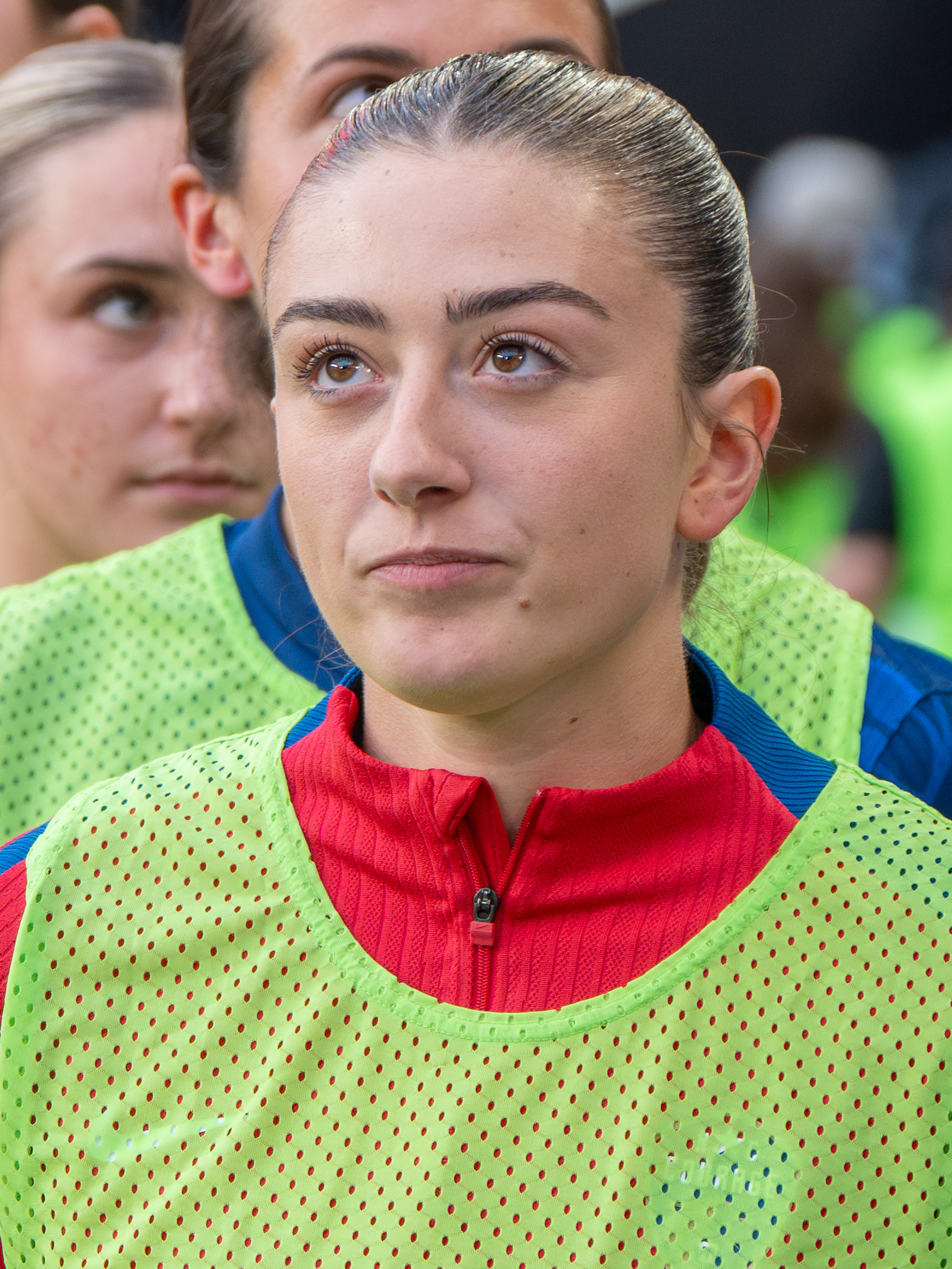
- Crawford with the North Carolina Courage in 2026

Personal information
- Birth name: Payton Elizabeth Linnehan
- Date of birth: March 25, 2001 (age 25)
- Place of birth: Milford, Massachusetts, U.S.
- Height: 5 ft 6 in (1.68 m)
- Position: Forward

Team information
- Current team: North Carolina Courage
- Number: 15

College career
Years	Team	Apps	(Gls)
2019–2023	Penn State Nittany Lions	90	(34)

Senior career*
Years	Team	Apps	(Gls)
2024–2025	Portland Thorns	31	(3)
2025–	North Carolina Courage	12	(0)

International career
2016	United States U15		
2017–2018	United States U17		
2022	United States U23		
- * Club domestic league appearances and goals as of 06:52, November 8, 2026 (UTC)

Payton Crawford (née Linnehan; born March 25, 2001) is an American professional soccer player who plays as a forward for the North Carolina Courage of the National Women's Soccer League (NWSL). She played college soccer for the Penn State Nittany Lions and was drafted by the Portland Thorns in the first round of the 2024 NWSL Draft.

== Early life ==
Crawford was raised in Douglas, Massachusetts, the daughter of Sheri and Sean Linnehan. She started playing youth soccer when she was about five years old. Crawford played club soccer for FC Stars of Massachusetts starting at age 12. She attended Blackstone Valley Regional Vocational Technical High School, playing two years for the soccer team before choosing to focus on club soccer.

== College career ==
Crawford played for the Penn State Nittany Lions from 2019 to 2023. She recorded 34 goals and 24 assists in 90 games. She was named the most outstanding offensive player of the 2019 Big Ten tournament after scoring the golden goal in the final. She scored two hat tricks at Penn State: one in the first half of a 2021 match against La Salle and another against Central Connecticut in the first round of the 2023 NCAA tournament.

== Club career ==
=== Portland Thorns ===
The Portland Thorns chose Crawford with the 11th pick of the 2024 NWSL Draft. She signed for a two-year contract with a mutual third-year option. She scored 90 seconds into her first start for the Thorns on May 1, 2024, and added an assist to Sophia Smith five minutes later to help beat Bay FC 3–2.

=== North Carolina Courage ===
Crawford with the North Carolina Courage in 2026

On August 30, 2025, the Thorns traded Crawford to the North Carolina Courage in exchange for $48,000 in intra-league transfer funds. North Carolina signed her to a new contract through 2027 with a mutual option for 2028. The following day, she made her club debut, coming on as a second-half substitute for Tyler Lussi in a 2–0 loss to the Kansas City Current. On September 13, she recorded her first Courage start and first assist in a 2–1 win over Angel City FC.

== International career ==
Crawford played on the United States national under-15, under-17 and under-23 teams. She won the Golden Boot of the 2016 CONCACAF Girls' U-15 Championship as the top scorer of the tournament.

== Personal life ==
Crawford got engaged to baseball player Reggie Crawford in January 2026. They married in April 2026.

== Career statistics ==
As of May 4, 2024

Appearances and goals by club, season and competition
Club	Season	League			Cup (Note: Includes the NWSL Challenge Cup.)		Playoffs (Note: Includes NWSL Playoffs.)		Total	
Club	Season	Division	Apps	Goals	Apps	Goals	Apps	Goals	Apps	Goals
Portland Thorns FC	2024	NWSL	4	1	—		—		4	1
Career total			4	1	0	0	0	0	4	1
