= Michigan Wolverines women's soccer =

Women's soccer team of the University of Michigan

- Founded: 1994; 32 years ago
- University: University of Michigan
- Head coach: Dave DiIanni (1st season)
- Conference: Big Ten
- Location: Ann Arbor, Michigan, US
- Stadium: U-M Soccer Stadium (capacity: 2,200)
- Nickname: Wolverines
- Colors: Maize and blue
Home	Away

NCAA tournament Quarterfinals
- 2002, 2013, 2021

NCAA tournament Round of 16
- 2002, 2003, 2012, 2013, 2019, 2021

NCAA tournament Round of 32
- 1997, 1998, 1999, 2000, 2001, 2002, 2003, 2012, 2013, 2019, 2021

NCAA tournament appearances
- 1997, 1998, 1999, 2000, 2001, 2002, 2003, 2004, 2006, 2010, 2012, 2013, 2016, 2019, 2021, 2023, 2026

Conference tournament championships
- 1997, 1999, 2021

The Michigan Wolverines women's soccer team is the women's intercollegiate soccer program representing the University of Michigan. The school competes in the Big Ten Conference in Division I of the National Collegiate Athletic Association (NCAA).

Michigan has won three Big Ten tournaments and has advanced as far as the quarterfinals in the NCAA Division I Women's Soccer Championship since the creation of the program in 1994. The Michigan women's soccer team plays its home games at the U-M Soccer Stadium on the university campus in Ann Arbor, Michigan.

== History ==
Women's soccer has been a varsity sport at the University of Michigan since 1994, and the team has played in the Big Ten Conference since its formation. The team has won the Big Ten conference tournament twice, in 1997 and 1999, although it has never won a regular season conference title: the best it has finished is second place, which it has done on four separate occasions. Michigan's best result in the NCAA Division I Women's Soccer Championship was a quarterfinal appearance in 2002. All of these achievements came during the tenure of Debbie Rademacher (née Belkin), who coached the team from its inception in 1994 until 2007.

Since the 2008 season, the team has been coached by Greg Ryan, who was previously the head coach of the United States women's national soccer team. Under Ryan, the team has qualified for three berths in the NCAA Division I Women's Soccer Championship, although it has not won any Big Ten titles. On January 25, 2018, it was announced that the University of Michigan and coach Greg Ryan decided to part ways after a 6–6–6 last season, 3–5–3 in Big Ten Play. Ryan was 103–64–36 in his time at Michigan.

On February 28, 2018, Michigan hired Jennifer Klein as head coach. On September 21, 2021, Michigan announced they extended Klein's contract through the 2025 season.

In 2021, Michigan won its 300th match as a varsity program and their third Big Ten Tournament in program history.

== Roster ==
As of November 2026

Note: Flags indicate national team as defined under FIFA eligibility rules; some limited exceptions apply. Players may hold more than one non-FIFA nationality.

No.	Pos.	Nation	Player
00	GK	USA	Malia Zillman
0	GK	USA	Brooklyn Reid
1	GK	USA	Sophie Homan
2	DF	USA	Anabelle Egeland
3	MF	USA	Coda Jones
4	MF	USA	Lilley Bosley
6	MF	USA	Adi Walick
7	MF	USA	Beanie Harshe
8	FW	USA	Brooklyn Marn
9	FW	CAN	Melisa Kekic
10	DF	USA	Campbell Jewell
11	FW	USA	Elle Ervin
12	MF	USA	Rylie McKinney

No.	Pos.	Nation	Player
13	DF	USA	Josie Owen-Kren
14	FW	USA	Ella Jablinskey
15	MF	USA	Luciana Latino
16	FW	USA	Gabrielle Prych
17	DF	USA	Ella Sims
18	DF	CAN	Torah Betteridge
21	MF	USA	Ellie Lesser
22	MF	USA	Maya Raghunandanan
24	DF	USA	Ellie Fife
26	FW	CAN	Natelle El Mokbel
27	DF	USA	Stella Tapia
33	FW	USA	Ana Schremp
99	GK	USA	Sofia Nehro

== Coaching staff ==
As of April 27, 2026

Position	Name
Head coach	(United States) Dave Dilanni
Assistant coach	(United States) Kyle Venter
Assistant coach	(Brazil) JP Valadares
Assistant coach	(United States) Addie Bundy

== Stadium ==
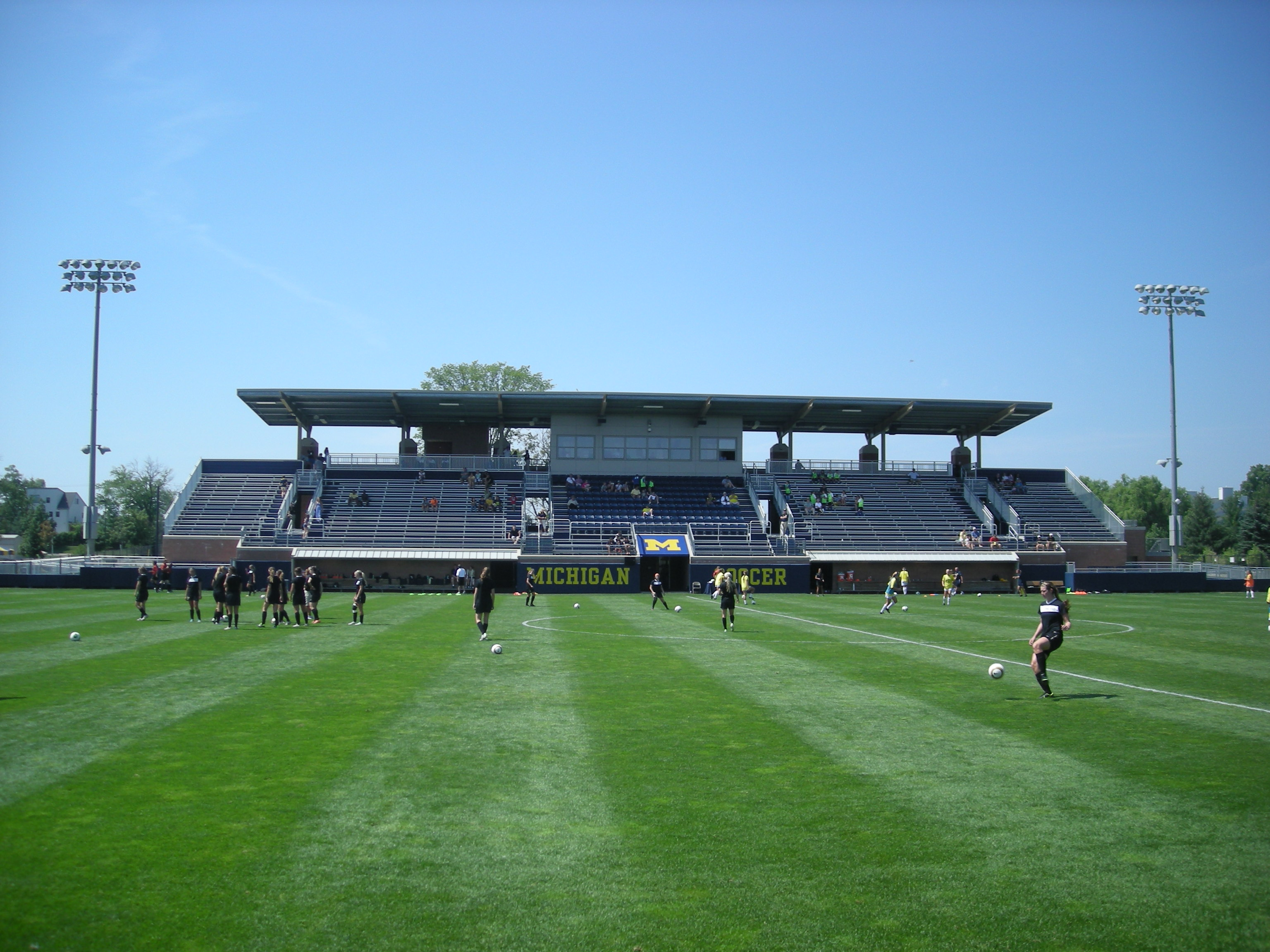
U-M Soccer Stadium as it appeared during the 2013 season

Michigan has played at the U-M Soccer Complex since 2008, and at the U-M Soccer Stadium (built on the site of the Soccer Complex) since 2010.

The entire complex cost $6 million to build and includes three fields, including separate practice fields for both the women's and men's teams. The 2,200-seat stadium is built around the central field, and it includes stands on both sides of the field that are both covered by a roof.

The stadium features a press box, separate home locker rooms for both the women's and men's teams, an athletic medicine training room, and handicap seating, as well as restrooms and concessions for spectators.

== Seasons ==
Year	Coach	Overall	Conference	Standing	Postseason	Coaches' poll	AP poll
1994	Debbie Rademacher	10–7–2	1–6	7th			
1995	Debbie Rademacher	7–11–2	1–5–1	8th			
1996	Debbie Rademacher	10–7–3	3–3–1	4th			
1997	Debbie Rademacher	18–4–1	7–1–1	2nd	NCAA First Round		
1998	Debbie Rademacher	14–7–1	5–3–1	5th	NCAA Second Round		
1999	Debbie Rademacher	17–6–1	8–1–1	2nd	NCAA Second Round		
2000	Debbie Rademacher	13–9–1	6–3–1	3rd	NCAA Second Round		
2001	Debbie Rademacher	13–8–1	8–2	2nd	NCAA Second Round		
2002	Debbie Rademacher	16–7–1	7–2–1	2nd	NCAA Quarterfinals		
2003	Debbie Rademacher	11–8–6	4–2–4	4th	NCAA Third Round		
2004	Debbie Rademacher	11–9–2	6–3–1	3rd	NCAA First Round		
2005	Debbie Rademacher	8–9–4	3–6–1	T6th			
2006	Debbie Rademacher	9–7–6	4–3–3	5th	NCAA First Round		
2007	Debbie Rademacher	3–9–6	1–5–4	9th			
Debbie Rademacher:		160–108–37	65–45–20				
Greg Ryan (Big Ten) (2008–2017)
2008	Greg Ryan	4–10–5	1–6–3	11th			
2009	Greg Ryan	6–9–5	1–4–5	T8th			
2010	Greg Ryan	10–5–4	5–3–2	5th	NCAA First Round		
2011	Greg Ryan	9–8–2	4–6–1	T8th			
2012	Greg Ryan	16–5–3	7–2–2	3rd	NCAA Third Round		
2013	Greg Ryan	18–4–1	9–1–1	2nd	NCAA Quarterfinals		
2014	Greg Ryan	12–5–3	8–2–3	3rd			
2015	Greg Ryan	12–7–2	6–3–2	5th			
2016	Greg Ryan	10–5–5	6–3–2	4th	NCAA First Round		
2017	Greg Ryan	6–6–6	3–5–3	10th			
Greg Ryan:		103–64–36	50–35–24				
Jennifer Klein (Big Ten) (2018–2025)
2018	Jennifer Klein	9–9–1	5–5–1	T-6th			
2019	Jennifer Klein	17–6–1	8–2–1	T-2nd	NCAA Round of 16		
2020	Jennifer Klein	5–3–3	5–3–3	T-7th			
2021	Jennifer Klein	18–4–3	6–2–2	3rd	NCAA Quarterfinals		
2022	Jennifer Klein	7–8–3	2–6–2	12th			
2023	Jennifer Klein	7–7–4	3–5–2	T-7th	NCAA First Round		
2024	Jennifer Klein	3–13–2	2–8–1	14th			
2025	Jennifer Klein	6–8–4	3–4–4	11th			
Jennifer Klein:		72–58–21	34–35–16				
Dave DiIanni (Big Ten) (2026–present)
2026	Dave DiIanni	8–6–5	5–5–2	9th	NCAA		
Dave DiIanni:		8–6–5	5–5–2				
Total:		343–236–99	154-120-62				
National champion Postseason invitational champion Conference regular season champion Conference regular season and conference tournament champion Division regular season champion Division regular season and conference tournament champion Conference tournament champion

== Awards and honors ==
Big Ten Midfielder of the Year

- Sarah Stratigakis (2019)

Big Ten Goalkeeper of the Year

- Haley Kopmeyer (2012)

First Team All-Big Ten

- Shelina Zadorsky (2012, 2013)
- Nkem Ezurike (2012, 2013)
- Holly Hein (2012, 2013)
- Meghan Toohey (2013)
- Nicky Waldeck (2014)
- Ani Sarkisian (2015)
- Alia Martin (2019, 2020, 2021)
- Sarah Stratigakis (2019)
- Nicki Hernandez (2020)
- Raleigh Loughman (2021)

Second Team All-Big Ten

- Ani Sarkisian (2016)
- Reilly Martin (2016, 2018)
- Nicky Waldeck (2016)
- Sarah Stratigakis (2017, 2018, 2020, 2021)
- Taylor Timko (2017)
- Meredith Haakenson (2019)
- Raleigh Loughman (2019, 2020)

Big Ten All-Freshman Team

- Ani Sarkisian (2014)
- Reilly Martin (2015)
- Sarah Stratigakis (2017)
- Janiece Joyner (2018)
- Jayde Riviere (2019)
- Danielle Wolfe (2019)
- Sammi Woods (2020)
- Avery Kalitta (2021)

=== All-Americans ===
First Team All-American

- Nkem Ezurike (2013)
- Alia Martin (2021)

Second Team All-American

- Amber Berendowsky (1997)
- Erin Gilhart (1997)
- Abby Crumpton (2002)
- Amy Sullivant (2002)
- Haley Kopmeyer (2012)
- Meghan Toohey (2013)
- Sarah Stratigakis (2019)

== Notable alumnae ==
This is a list of former players who have received international caps and/or have played professional soccer.

Updated April 30, 2023

- (United States) Hillary Beall
- (New Zealand) Hannah Blake
- (United States) Abby Crumpton
- (Canada) Nkem Ezurike
- (United States) Holly Hein
- (United States) Haley Kopmeyer
- (Canada) Jayde Riviere
- (Canada) Sarah Stratigakis
- (United States) Meghan Toohey
- (Canada) Shelina Zadorsky
