= Maryland Terrapins women's soccer =

American college soccer team

- Founded: 1987
- University: University of Maryland, College Park
- Head coach: Michael Marchiano (2nd season)
- Conference: Big Ten
- Location: College Park, Maryland, US
- Stadium: Ludwig Field
- Nickname: Terrapins
- Colors: Red, white, black, and gold

NCAA tournament Quarterfinals
- 1995, 1996

NCAA tournament Round of 16
- 1995, 1996, 2004, 2009, 2011

NCAA tournament appearances
- 1995, 1996, 1997, 1998, 1999, 2001, 2002, 2003, 2004, 2009, 2010, 2011, 2012

The Maryland Terrapins women's soccer is the team who represents the University of Maryland in National Collegiate Athletic Association (NCAA) college soccer competition. The Terrapins were members of the Atlantic Coast Conference from 1987 until 2013, they joined the Big Ten Conference in 2014. They play most of their games on their home grass, Ludwig Field. The Terrapins are coached by Michael Marchiano.

== Year-by-year record ==
Year	Head coach	Overall	Conference	Conference Tournament	NCAA Tournament
1987	Hans Orthner	8–12–0	0–3–0		
1988	Hans Orthner	10–9–2	0–2–1		
1989	Marcia McDermott	3–12–1	0–4–0		
1990	Alden Shattuck	6–10–2	0–4–0		
1991	April Heinrichs	7–12–0	0–4–0		
1992	April Heinrichs	11–7–2	0–4–0		
1993	April Heinrichs	13–5–2	0–3–1		
1994	April Heinrichs	7–10–3	1–4–1		
1995	April Heinrichs	18–6–0	4–3–0	ACC Runner-up	NCAA quarterfinals
1996	Alan Kirkup	19–5–2	2–3–2		NCAA quarterfinals
1997	Alan Kirkup	12–9–3	4–3–0	ACC Runner-up	NCAA 1st round
1998	Alan Kirkup	11–11–1	3–4–0		NCAA 2nd round
1999	Shannon Higgins-Cirovski	11–10–1	4–2–1		NCAA 2nd round
2000	Shannon Higgins-Cirovski	8–11–0	1–6–0		
2001	Shannon Higgins-Cirovski	10–7–2	3–4–0		NCAA 1st round
2002	Shannon Higgins-Cirovski	13–8–1	3–3–1		NCAA 2nd round
2003	Shannon Higgins-Cirovski	11–8–2	2–5–0		NCAA 1st round
2004	Shannon Higgins-Cirovski	9–7–4	3–4–2		NCAA Sweet 16
2005	Brian Pensky	5–11–3	3–5–2		
2006	Brian Pensky	5–9–4	1–6–3		
2007	Brian Pensky	6–9–3	1–8–1		
2008	Brian Pensky	7–10–1	3–7–0		
2009	Brian Pensky	14–6–2	4–4–2		NCAA Sweet 16
2010	Brian Pensky	18–2–3	7–2–1	ACC Runner-up	NCAA 2nd round
2011	Brian Pensky	12–6–4	4–4–2		NCAA Sweet 16
2012	Jonathan Morgan	14–7–2	6–3–1	ACC Runner-up	NCAA 2nd round
2013	Jonathan Morgan	10–10–0	6–7–0		
2014	Jonathan Morgan	5–6–7	3–5–5		
2015	Jonathan Morgan	6–12–1	1–9–1		
2016	Ray Leone	3–15–1	1–10–0		
2017	Ray Leone	7–8–3	1–8–2		
2018	Ray Leone	4–10–5	2–7–2		
2019	Ray Leone	9–8–3	5–5–1		
S-2021	Ray Leone	0–10–2	0–10–2		
F-2021	Ray Leone	4–9–5	0–7–3		
2022	Meghan Ryan Nemzer	4–8–5	3–7–0		
2023	Meghan Ryan Nemzer	3–10–5	0–9–1		
2024	Michael Marchiano	4–10–5	1–8–2		

== Awards and honors ==
=== ACC Player of the Year ===
- Erin Taylor – 1996

=== ACC First Team ===
- Erin Taylor – 1995, 1996
- Michelle Demko – 1995
- Emmy Harbo – 1996
- Abby Bausman – 1998
- Keri Sarver – 1998
- Emily Janss – 1999
- Katie Ludwig – 2002
- Mallory Mahar – 2004
- Nikki Resnick – 2005, 2006
- Mary Casey – 2008
- Jasmyne Spencer – 2009, 2010

=== ACC Second Team ===
- Erin Taylor – 1994
- Robin McCullough – 1996, 1997
- Emily Janss – 1997, 1998
- Keri Sarver – 1997
- Riki-Ann Serrins – 1998, 2000
- Emmy Harbo – 1998
- Jackie Mynarski – 1999
- Lindsay Givens – 2001
- Ali Wolff – 2001
- Kimmy Francis – 2002, 2004, 2005
- Mallory Mahar – 2002, 2003
- Jenny Biscoe – 2003
- Jasmyne Spencer – 2011
- Hayley Brock – 2012, 2013
- Becky Kaplan – 2012

=== ACC Third Team ===
- Ashley Spivey – 2013

=== ACC All Freshman Team ===
- Audra Poulin – 2000
- Ali Andrzejewski – 2002
- Mallory Mahar – 2002
- Ashly Kennedy – 2003
- Nataly Arias – 2004
- Kelly Rozumalski – 2004
- Yewande Balogun – 2007
- Danielle Hubka – 2009
- Ashley Spivey – 2012

=== Big Ten Medal of Honor ===
- Rachelle Beanlands – 2016

=== Big Ten Second Team ===
- Alyssa Poarch – 2020

=== Big Ten Third Team ===
- Rachel Egyed – 2018, 2019

=== Big Ten All Freshman Team ===
- Kennedy Bell – 2023

=== ACC Coach of the Year ===
- April Heinrichs – 1995
- Shannon Cirovski – 1999, 2002
- Brian Pensky – 2010
